= World Blitz Chess Championship 2025 =

Global chess tournament

- Doha, Qatar
- 29–30 December 2025
| | World Blitz Champion | Women's; World Blitz Champion |
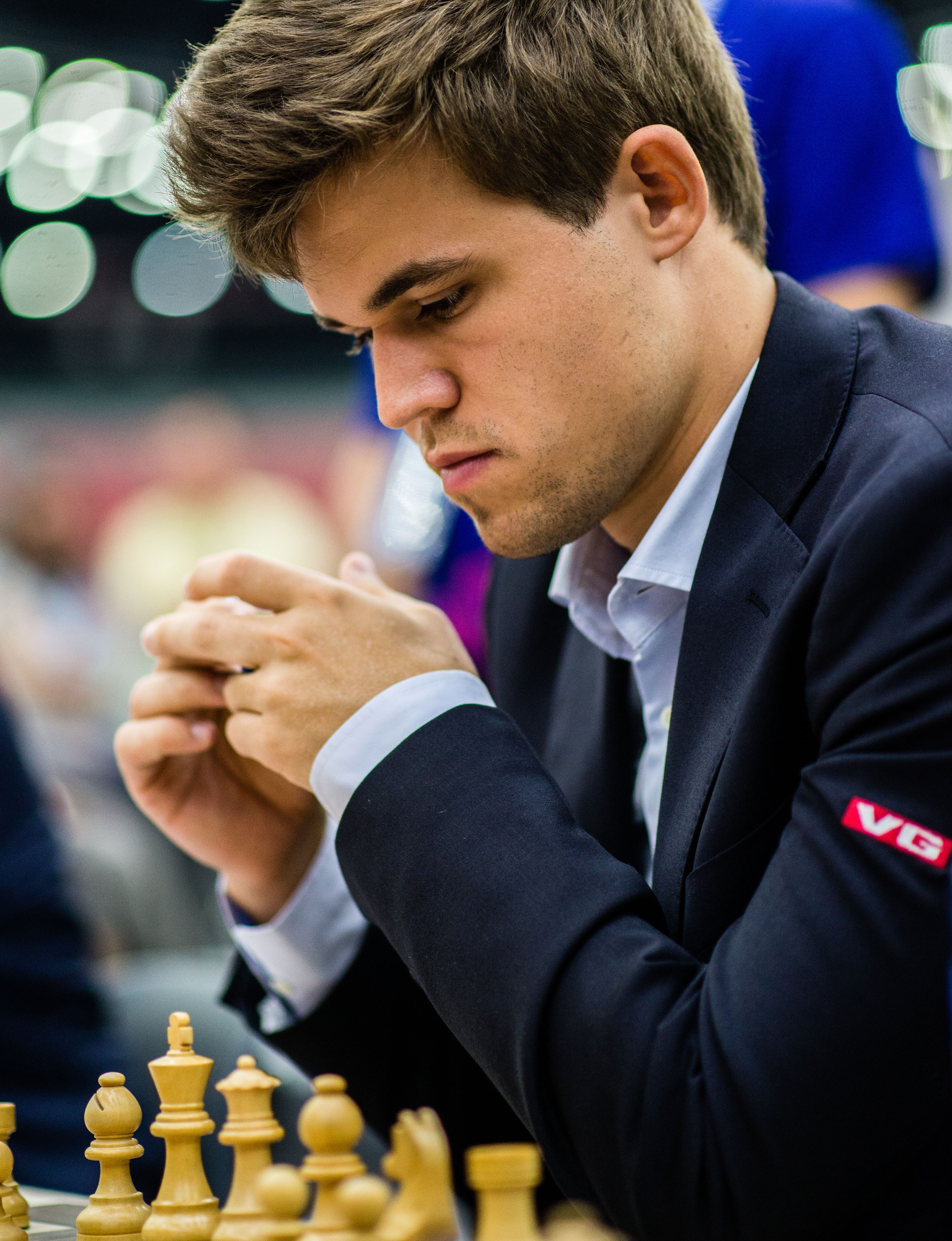
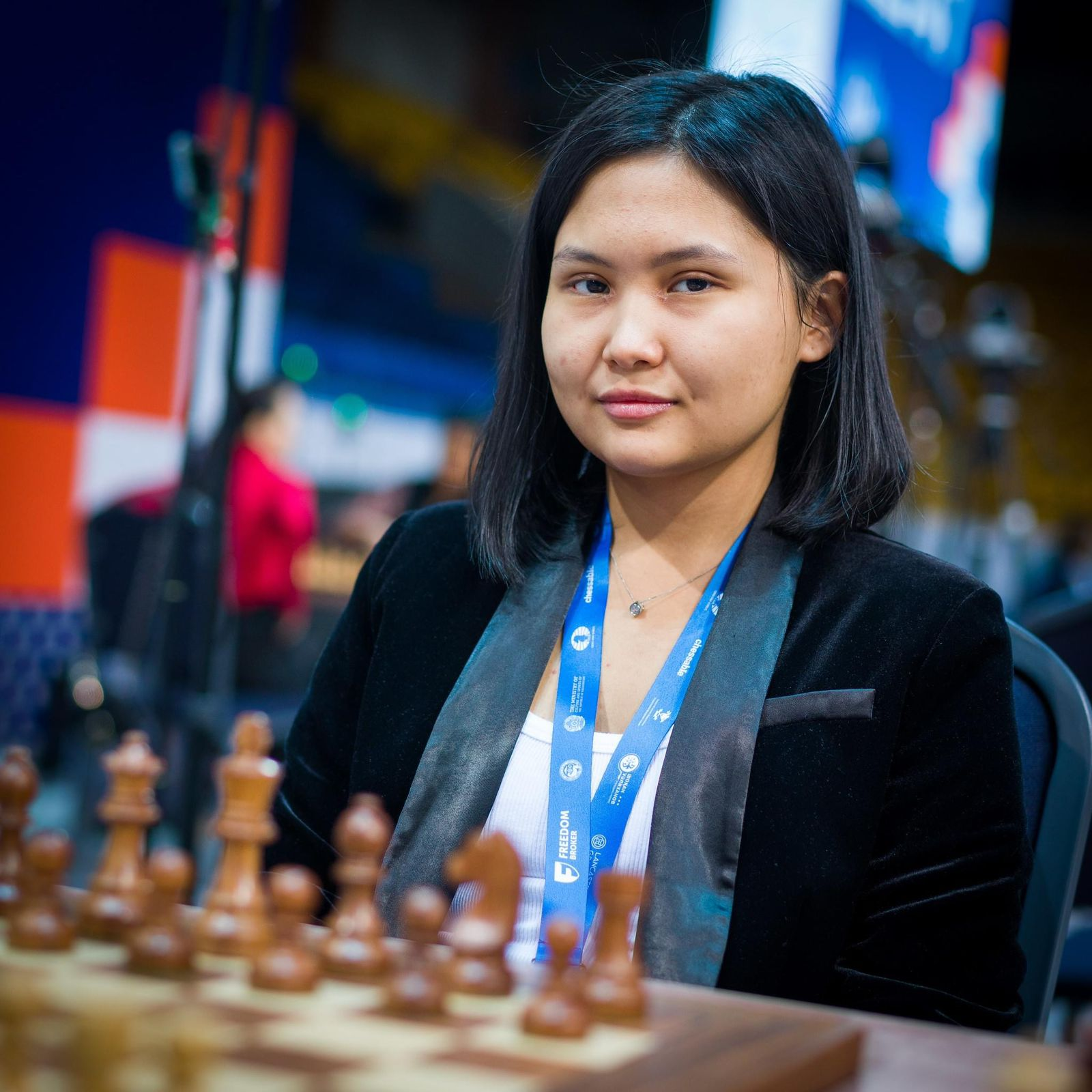
| | (Norway) Magnus Carlsen | (Kazakhstan) Bibisara Assaubayeva |

The 2025 World Blitz Chess Championship was the 27th World Blitz Chess Championship held by FIDE to determine the world champion in chess played under blitz time controls. Since 2012, FIDE has held the World Rapid and Blitz Championships at a joint tournament. The tournament was held in Doha, Qatar, from 29 to 30 December 2025.

The open section of the tournament was won by Magnus Carlsen in his ninth victory in the competition. The women's section was won by the Kazakh grandmaster Bibisara Assaubayeva for the third time.

== Details ==
The tournament is open for players with a rating of 2550 and above, as well as reigning national champions. The total prize fund is €350,000.

The tournament followed a Swiss system consisting of 19 rounds for the Open section and 15 rounds for the Women's section. The top 4 players from the Swiss system proceeded to the knockout rounds, where players play four-game matches in semi-finals and finals. The time control is blitz, with each player given 3 minutes plus 2 additional seconds per move, starting from the first move. Since 2012, FIDE has held the World Rapid and Blitz Championships as a joint tournament.

== Open tournament Results ==
=== Swiss-system tournament ===
The following table lists all participants, with the results from the 19 rounds. The top four advanced to the knockout stage.

Notation: "1 (W 101)" indicates a win (1 point) with white pieces (W) against player who finished in 101st place (Mukhammadzokhid Suyarov).

| Rank | Name | Rating | 1 | 2 | 3 | 4 | 5 | 6 | 7 | 8 | 9 | 10 | 11 | 12 | 13 | 14 | 15 | 16 | 17 | 18 | 19 | Total | BC1 | BS | AROC1 |
|---|---|---|---|---|---|---|---|---|---|---|---|---|---|---|---|---|---|---|---|---|---|---|---|---|---|
| 1 | (India) Arjun Erigaisi | 2749 | 1 (W 101) | 1 (B 230) | 1 (W 60) | 1 (B 47) | 1 (W 40) | 0 (B 23) | 1 (W 69) | ½ (W 15) | 1 (B 3) | 1 (B 4) | ½ (W 2) | ½ (W 5) | ½ (B 10) | ½ (B 20) | 1 (W 26) | 1 (W 11) | 1 (B 14) | 1 (W 12) | ½ (B 7) | 15 | 219 | 226 | 2684 |
| 2 | (United States) Fabiano Caruana | 2751 | 1 (W 114) | ½ (B 24) | 1 (W 108) | 0 (B 29) | 1 (W 36) | 1 (B 72) | ½ (W 75) | 1 (B 73) | 1 (W 32) | 1 (B 70) | ½ (B 1) | 1 (W 3) | ½ (B 5) | 1 (W 22) | ½ (W 6) | ½ (B 20) | ½ (B 10) | ½ (W 26) | 1 (B 18) | 14 | 215.5 | 225.5 | 2663 |
| 3 | (Norway) Magnus Carlsen | 2881 | 1 (B 111) | 1 (W 164) | 1 (B 131) | ½ (W 14) | 1 (W 25) | ½ (B 49) | 1 (W 40) | ½ (B 23) | 0 (W 1) | ½ (B 22) | 1 (W 32) | 0 (B 2) | 1 (W 12) | 0 (B 26) | 1 (W 80) | 1 (B 21) | 1 (W 19) | 1 (B 5) | ½ (W 4) | 13.5 | 217 | 226 | 2656 |
| 4 | (Uzbekistan) Nodirbek Abdusattorov | 2768 | 1 (B 185) | 0 (W 79) | 1 (B 178) | 1 (W 58) | 1 (B 9) | 1 (W 32) | 1 (W 23) | ½ (B 11) | 1 (B 15) | 0 (W 1) | 0 (B 5) | ½ (W 14) | 1 (B 80) | 1 (W 31) | 0 (B 10) | 1 (W 53) | ½ (B 26) | 1 (W 17) | ½ (B 3) | 13 | 216.5 | 225 | 2666 |
| 5 | (France) Maxime Vachier-Lagrave | 2745 | 1 (W 96) | 0 (B 123) | 1 (W 170) | 1 (B 24) | 1 (W 95) | ½ (B 121) | 1 (W 53) | ½ (B 20) | 1 (W 47) | 1 (B 12) | 1 (W 4) | ½ (B 1) | ½ (W 2) | 1 (B 48) | ½ (W 21) | ½ (W 10) | ½ (B 16) | 0 (W 3) | ½ (B 13) | 13 | 214 | 222.5 | 2681 |
| 6 | (United States) Wesley So | 2790 | ½ (B 155) | 0 (W 169) | 1 (B 77) | 1 (W 184) | 1 (B 209) | 1 (W 120) | 1 (B 29) | ½ (W 52) | ½ (B 22) | ½ (W 48) | ½ (B 12) | 1 (W 8) | 1 (B 89) | ½ (W 10) | ½ (B 2) | ½ (W 16) | ½ (B 11) | ½ (W 14) | 1 (B 24) | 13 | 203.5 | 211 | 2611 |
| 7 | (India) Nihal Sarin | 2681 | 0 (B 126) | 1 (W 136) | 1 (B 85) | 1 (W 46) | 1 (B 65) | 0 (W 73) | ½ (B 71) | 1 (W 104) | 0 (B 43) | 1 (W 132) | 1 (B 28) | ½ (W 24) | ½ (B 18) | 0 (W 53) | 1 (B 107) | 1 (W 44) | 1 (B 31) | 1 (W 10) | ½ (W 1) | 13 | 203 | 212.5 | 2583 |
| 8 | (FIDE) Denis Lazavik | 2617 | ½ (B 189) | 0 (W 58) | 1 (B 149) | 1 (W 154) | 0 (B 126) | 1 (W 19) | 1 (B 125) | ½ (W 99) | 1 (B 179) | 1 (W 71) | 1 (W 49) | 0 (B 6) | ½ (W 27) | ½ (B 17) | 1 (W 120) | ½ (B 15) | ½ (W 13) | 1 (B 33) | 1 (W 20) | 13 | 196.5 | 204.5 | 2583 |
| 9 | (FIDE) Maxim Matlakov | 2591 | 1 (W 202) | ½ (B 146) | ½ (W 203) | 1 (B 169) | 0 (W 4) | 1 (B 51) | ½ (W 144) | 0 (B 119) | 1 (W 188) | 0 (W 89) | 1 (B 103) | ½ (B 143) | 1 (W 45) | 1 (B 70) | ½ (B 27) | 1 (W 55) | ½ (B 48) | 1 (W 22) | 1 (B 26) | 13 | 185 | 192.5 | 2551 |
| 10 | (FIDE) Daniil Dubov | 2795 | 1 (W 54) | 1 (B 68) | ½ (W 93) | ½ (B 73) | 1 (W 41) | ½ (B 75) | ½ (W 70) | 1 (B 30) | ½ (W 52) | 1 (B 53) | 1 (B 11) | ½ (W 20) | ½ (W 1) | ½ (B 6) | 1 (W 4) | ½ (B 5) | ½ (W 2) | 0 (B 7) | ½ (W 12) | 12.5 | 217 | 227 | 2672 |
| 11 | (China) Lu Shanglei | 2657 | 1 (W 133) | 1 (B 45) | 1 (W 157) | 1 (B 69) | ½ (W 49) | ½ (B 21) | 1 (W 35) | ½ (W 4) | ½ (B 23) | ½ (B 20) | 0 (W 10) | 1 (B 41) | 1 (W 31) | ½ (B 13) | 1 (W 50) | 0 (B 1) | ½ (W 6) | ½ (B 16) | ½ (W 19) | 12.5 | 216 | 225 | 2670 |
| 12 | (Azerbaijan) Teimour Radjabov | 2646 | 0 (B 206) | 1 (W 106) | 1 (B 19) | 1 (W 145) | 1 (B 71) | 1 (W 13) | 0 (B 15) | 1 (W 120) | 1 (B 17) | 0 (W 5) | ½ (W 6) | ½ (B 27) | 0 (B 3) | 1 (W 57) | 1 (B 37) | 1 (W 52) | 1 (W 74) | 0 (B 1) | ½ (B 10) | 12.5 | 212.5 | 220 | 2660 |
| 13 | (FIDE) Ian Nepomniachtchi | 2801 | 1 (B 116) | 1 (W 82) | 1 (B 91) | ½ (W 34) | ½ (W 29) | 0 (B 12) | 0 (W 47) | ½ (B 90) | 1 (W 124) | 1 (W 25) | 1 (B 56) | ½ (B 50) | 1 (W 30) | ½ (W 11) | ½ (B 53) | ½ (W 31) | ½ (B 8) | 1 (B 38) | ½ (W 5) | 12.5 | 207.5 | 217 | 2606 |
| 14 | (Uzbekistan) Javokhir Sindarov | 2632 | 1 (W 148) | 1 (B 138) | 1 (W 168) | ½ (B 3) | 0 (W 119) | ½ (B 96) | 1 (W 90) | ½ (B 69) | 1 (W 63) | ½ (B 49) | ½ (W 27) | ½ (B 4) | ½ (B 15) | 1 (W 18) | 1 (B 22) | 1 (W 48) | 0 (W 1) | ½ (B 6) | ½ (W 16) | 12.5 | 207.5 | 216 | 2646 |
| 15 | (France) Alireza Firouzja | 2813 | 1 (W 140) | 1 (B 107) | 1 (W 205) | 1 (B 76) | 0 (W 23) | 1 (B 119) | 1 (W 12) | ½ (B 1) | 0 (W 4) | ½ (B 50) | 1 (W 59) | 0 (B 22) | ½ (W 14) | 1 (B 121) | 0 (W 48) | ½ (W 8) | 1 (B 91) | ½ (W 29) | 1 (B 28) | 12.5 | 206 | 213.5 | 2628 |
| 16 | (Poland) Jan-Krzysztof Duda | 2750 | 0 (B 90) | 1 (W 211) | 1 (B 109) | ½ (W 82) | 1 (B 79) | 1 (W 91) | ½ (B 28) | 0 (W 31) | 1 (B 102) | 1 (W 38) | ½ (B 30) | 1 (W 53) | 0 (B 48) | 1 (W 56) | 1 (B 44) | ½ (B 6) | ½ (W 5) | ½ (W 11) | ½ (B 14) | 12.5 | 204.5 | 212 | 2609 |
| 17 | (FIDE) Vladislav Artemiev | 2733 | 1 (W 51) | ½ (B 108) | 1 (W 213) | ½ (B 93) | 1 (W 60) | ½ (B 53) | 1 (W 121) | ½ (B 47) | 0 (W 12) | 1 (B 80) | ½ (W 41) | ½ (B 30) | ½ (W 38) | ½ (W 8) | 1 (B 91) | 1 (B 50) | ½ (W 20) | 0 (B 4) | 1 (W 40) | 12.5 | 202.5 | 210 | 2616 |
| 18 | (Armenia) Aram Hakobyan | 2581 | 0 (W 182) | 0 (B 147) | 1 (W 201) | 1 (B 198) | ½ (W 183) | 1 (B 189) | ½ (W 77) | 1 (B 97) | 1 (W 142) | 1 (B 35) | 0 (W 22) | 1 (B 74) | ½ (W 7) | 0 (B 14) | 1 (W 119) | 1 (B 40) | 1 (W 21) | 1 (B 20) | 0 (W 2) | 12.5 | 190.5 | 198.5 | 2550 |
| 19 | (Ukraine) Ihor Samunenkov | 2487 | 1 (W 74) | 0 (B 47) | 0 (W 12) | ½ (B 251) | 1 (W 194) | 0 (B 8) | 1 (W 128) | ½ (B 205) | ½ (W 112) | 1 (B 147) | ½ (W 129) | 1 (B 95) | 1 (W 63) | 1 (B 94) | 1 (W 141) | 1 (W 33) | 0 (B 3) | 1 (W 53) | ½ (B 11) | 12.5 | 190.5 | 197 | 2602 |
| 20 | (China) Yu Yangyi | 2704 | ½ (B 169) | ½ (W 155) | 1 (B 42) | 1 (W 151) | ½ (B 91) | 1 (W 125) | 1 (B 127) | ½ (W 5) | 1 (B 25) | ½ (W 11) | 1 (B 23) | ½ (B 10) | ½ (W 22) | ½ (W 1) | 1 (B 52) | ½ (W 2) | ½ (B 17) | 0 (W 18) | 0 (B 8) | 12 | 210.5 | 219 | 2625 |
| 21 | (China) Bu Xiangzhi | 2719 | 1 (B 85) | 1 (W 180) | ½ (B 79) | 1 (W 209) | 1 (B 34) | ½ (W 11) | ½ (B 25) | ½ (W 27) | 1 (B 28) | ½ (W 23) | ½ (B 31) | ½ (W 48) | ½ (B 52) | 1 (W 24) | ½ (B 5) | 0 (W 3) | 0 (B 18) | 1 (W 56) | ½ (B 29) | 12 | 210 | 217.5 | 2631 |
| 22 | (FIDE) Alexander Grischuk | 2665 | 1 (W 165) | 1 (B 143) | 0 (W 69) | 1 (B 115) | 1 (W 157) | 0 (B 25) | 1 (W 112) | 1 (B 75) | ½ (W 6) | ½ (W 3) | 1 (B 18) | 1 (W 15) | ½ (B 20) | 0 (B 2) | 0 (W 14) | ½ (B 38) | 1 (W 57) | 0 (B 9) | 1 (W 47) | 12 | 208 | 217 | 2628 |
| 23 | (Netherlands) Jorden van Foreest | 2657 | 1 (B 110) | 1 (W 162) | 1 (B 46) | 1 (W 71) | 1 (B 15) | 1 (W 1) | 0 (B 4) | ½ (W 3) | ½ (W 11) | ½ (B 21) | 0 (W 20) | ½ (B 144) | 0 (W 120) | 1 (B 69) | 0 (W 41) | ½ (W 24) | 1 (B 107) | 1 (B 76) | ½ (W 31) | 12 | 207.5 | 216.5 | 2622 |
| 24 | (India) Pranesh M | 2553 | 1 (B 201) | ½ (W 2) | ½ (B 89) | 0 (W 5) | 1 (B 136) | 1 (W 105) | 0 (B 48) | 1 (W 153) | 1 (B 29) | 1 (W 26) | ½ (W 50) | ½ (B 7) | 1 (W 32) | 0 (B 21) | ½ (W 74) | ½ (B 23) | 1 (W 59) | 1 (B 62) | 0 (W 6) | 12 | 206 | 214 | 2620 |
| 25 | (India) Pranav Anand | 2393 | 1 (B 159) | 1 (W 57) | 1 (B 56) | 1 (W 32) | 0 (B 3) | 1 (W 22) | ½ (W 21) | ½ (B 49) | 0 (W 20) | 0 (B 13) | 1 (W 95) | 0 (B 47) | ½ (W 36) | ½ (B 65) | 1 (W 67) | 0 (B 63) | 1 (W 93) | 1 (B 80) | 1 (W 48) | 12 | 205 | 214 | 2649 |
| 26 | (Armenia) Haik M. Martirosyan | 2679 | 1 (W 92) | 1 (B 115) | 0 (W 123) | 0 (B 143) | 1 (W 101) | 1 (B 145) | 0 (W 93) | 1 (B 96) | 1 (W 119) | 0 (B 24) | 1 (W 151) | 1 (B 36) | 1 (W 47) | 1 (W 3) | 0 (B 1) | 1 (B 41) | ½ (W 4) | ½ (B 2) | 0 (W 9) | 12 | 202 | 211 | 2597 |
| 27 | (United States) Levon Aronian | 2774 | 0 (W 72) | 1 (B 241) | ½ (W 150) | 1 (B 213) | 1 (W 203) | 1 (B 54) | 1 (W 50) | ½ (B 21) | 0 (W 70) | 1 (W 43) | ½ (B 14) | ½ (W 12) | ½ (B 8) | ½ (B 38) | ½ (W 9) | ½ (B 60) | ½ (W 41) | 1 (W 37) | ½ (B 30) | 12 | 200 | 206 | 2576 |
| 28 | (FIDE) David Paravyan | 2528 | 1 (W 233) | ½ (B 70) | ½ (W 35) | ½ (B 78) | 1 (W 128) | 1 (B 141) | ½ (W 16) | 1 (B 40) | 0 (W 21) | ½ (B 75) | 0 (W 7) | 0 (B 121) | ½ (W 135) | 1 (B 39) | 1 (W 49) | 1 (B 47) | 1 (W 50) | 1 (B 48) | 0 (W 15) | 12 | 199 | 205.5 | 2674 |
| 29 | (Azerbaijan) Rauf Mamedov | 2612 | ½ (W 166) | 1 (B 100) | 1 (W 142) | 1 (W 2) | ½ (B 13) | ½ (B 70) | 0 (W 6) | ½ (B 92) | 0 (W 24) | ½ (B 54) | 1 (W 124) | 0 (B 60) | ½ (W 90) | 1 (B 109) | 1 (W 143) | 1 (B 51) | 1 (W 89) | ½ (B 15) | ½ (W 21) | 12 | 197 | 205.5 | 2583 |
| 30 | (France) Jules Moussard | 2629 | 1 (W 97) | ½ (B 154) | 1 (W 72) | 0 (B 120) | ½ (W 51) | 1 (B 157) | 1 (W 96) | 0 (W 10) | 1 (B 58) | 1 (B 69) | ½ (W 16) | ½ (W 17) | 0 (B 13) | 0 (B 54) | ½ (W 68) | 1 (B 167) | 1 (W 100) | 1 (B 41) | ½ (W 27) | 12 | 196 | 204.5 | 2579 |
| 31 | (India) S. L. Narayanan | 2619 | 0 (W 142) | 1 (B 202) | 1 (W 130) | 1 (B 124) | ½ (W 125) | ½ (B 188) | 1 (W 126) | 1 (B 16) | ½ (W 49) | 1 (B 52) | ½ (W 21) | 1 (W 55) | 0 (B 11) | 0 (B 4) | 1 (W 92) | ½ (B 13) | 0 (W 7) | 1 (B 74) | ½ (B 23) | 12 | 196 | 204 | 2626 |
| 32 | (FIDE) Volodar Murzin | 2647 | 1 (W 87) | 1 (B 124) | 1 (W 188) | 0 (B 25) | 1 (W 143) | 0 (B 4) | 1 (W 150) | 1 (B 93) | 0 (B 2) | 1 (W 57) | 0 (B 3) | 1 (W 71) | 0 (B 24) | 0 (W 91) | ½ (B 82) | 1 (W 145) | 1 (B 72) | ½ (W 55) | 1 (B 61) | 12 | 196 | 204 | 2592 |
| 33 | (Vietnam) Lê Quang Liêm | 2695 | ½ (B 122) | 1 (W 77) | 1 (B 184) | ½ (W 65) | 0 (B 57) | ½ (W 86) | 0 (B 104) | 1 (W 109) | 1 (W 125) | ½ (B 36) | 1 (W 93) | ½ (B 94) | ½ (W 41) | 1 (B 67) | 1 (W 54) | 0 (B 19) | 1 (W 63) | 0 (W 8) | 1 (B 53) | 12 | 195 | 203.5 | 2551 |
| 34 | (Austria) Kirill Alekseenko | 2620 | 1 (B 199) | 1 (W 109) | 1 (B 105) | ½ (B 13) | 0 (W 21) | ½ (W 126) | 0 (B 89) | 0 (W 103) | 0 (W 42) | 1 (B 165) | ½ (W 51) | 1 (B 130) | 1 (W 124) | ½ (B 143) | 1 (W 69) | 1 (B 54) | 0 (B 37) | 1 (W 65) | 1 (B 55) | 12 | 189 | 197 | 2529 |
| 35 | (FIDE) Andrey Esipenko | 2659 | ½ (B 77) | 1 (W 122) | ½ (B 28) | 1 (W 86) | 1 (B 123) | 1 (W 98) | 0 (B 11) | ½ (W 89) | ½ (B 79) | 0 (W 18) | 0 (B 71) | ½ (W 152) | 0 (B 145) | ½ (W 96) | 1 (B 101) | 1 (W 143) | 1 (B 42) | 1 (W 91) | 1 (B 64) | 12 | 188.5 | 197.5 | 2538 |
| 36 | (FIDE) Artem Uskov | 2569 | 1 (W 191) | ½ (B 89) | 0 (W 119) | 1 (B 146) | 0 (B 2) | 1 (W 232) | 1 (B 154) | 1 (W 56) | 0 (B 48) | ½ (W 33) | 1 (B 81) | 0 (W 26) | ½ (B 25) | ½ (W 122) | 0 (B 62) | 1 (W 142) | 1 (B 120) | 1 (W 59) | 1 (B 73) | 12 | 188.5 | 195 | 2535 |
| 37 | (Azerbaijan) Khagan Ahmad | 2421 | 1 (W 128) | 1 (B 174) | 0 (W 76) | 0 (B 95) | 1 (W 134) | 0 (B 129) | 1 (W 46) | ½ (B 60) | ½ (W 167) | 1 (B 123) | 0 (W 94) | 1 (B 151) | 1 (W 93) | 1 (B 47) | 0 (W 12) | 1 (B 80) | 1 (W 34) | 0 (B 27) | 1 (W 62) | 12 | 188 | 196.5 | 2601 |
| 38 | (Germany) Vincent Keymer | 2599 | ½ (W 119) | 0 (B 166) | 1 (W 204) | 0 (B 92) | ½ (W 142) | 1 (B 195) | 1 (W 133) | 1 (B 148) | 1 (W 192) | 0 (B 16) | 1 (B 77) | 1 (W 61) | ½ (B 17) | ½ (W 27) | ½ (B 55) | ½ (W 22) | 1 (B 52) | 0 (W 13) | 1 (B 50) | 12 | 187.5 | 195 | 2578 |
| 39 | (Spain) Jaime Santos Latasa | 2611 | 1 (B 136) | 0 (W 90) | ½ (B 126) | 1 (W 122) | ½ (B 58) | 1 (W 111) | 0 (B 120) | 0 (W 51) | 0 (B 96) | 1 (W 196) | 1 (B 185) | 0 (W 72) | 1 (B 101) | 0 (W 28) | 1 (B 103) | 1 (W 71) | 1 (B 102) | 1 (W 106) | 1 (B 52) | 12 | 182.5 | 190.5 | 2499 |
| 40 | (United Arab Emirates) Salem Saleh | 2651 | 1 (B 176) | 1 (W 117) | 1 (B 152) | 1 (W 158) | 0 (B 1) | 1 (W 57) | 0 (B 3) | 0 (W 28) | 0 (B 72) | 1 (W 96) | 1 (B 127) | 0 (W 91) | ½ (B 66) | 1 (W 71) | 1 (B 145) | 0 (W 18) | 1 (B 82) | 1 (W 43) | 0 (B 17) | 11.5 | 197 | 205.5 | 2573 |
| 41 | (Ukraine) Ruslan Ponomariov | 2589 | 0 (B 175) | 1 (W 139) | 1 (B 110) | 1 (W 219) | 0 (B 10) | 1 (W 229) | ½ (B 99) | 1 (W 173) | ½ (B 55) | 1 (W 61) | ½ (B 17) | 0 (W 11) | ½ (B 33) | 1 (W 81) | 1 (B 23) | 0 (W 26) | ½ (B 27) | 0 (W 30) | 1 (B 77) | 11.5 | 194.5 | 201.5 | 2592 |
| 42 | (Turkey) Yağız Kaan Erdoğmuş | 2497 | 0 (W 49) | 1 (B 223) | 0 (W 20) | 1 (B 216) | ½ (W 94) | 1 (W 84) | 0 (B 64) | ½ (W 131) | 1 (B 34) | ½ (B 78) | 1 (W 76) | 1 (B 98) | 0 (W 121) | 1 (B 75) | 0 (W 59) | 1 (B 128) | 0 (W 35) | 1 (B 88) | 1 (W 70) | 11.5 | 188 | 195 | 2625 |
| 43 | (Bulgaria) Arkadij Naiditsch | 2577 | ½ (W 170) | 0 (B 119) | 1 (W 172) | ½ (B 166) | 1 (W 190) | 1 (B 148) | ½ (W 74) | 1 (B 141) | 1 (W 7) | 0 (B 27) | 0 (W 52) | 0 (B 54) | ½ (W 51) | 1 (B 191) | ½ (W 100) | 1 (B 45) | 1 (W 70) | 0 (B 40) | 1 (W 76) | 11.5 | 184 | 192 | 2553 |
| 44 | (Norway) Elham Amar | 2610 | 0 (W 146) | 1 (B 137) | 1 (W 183) | 0 (B 125) | 1 (W 133) | 0 (B 150) | 1 (W 190) | ½ (B 188) | ½ (W 189) | 1 (B 51) | 1 (W 167) | ½ (B 100) | 1 (W 78) | 1 (B 59) | 0 (W 16) | 0 (B 7) | 0 (B 55) | 1 (W 72) | 1 (B 85) | 11.5 | 179.5 | 187.5 | 2540 |
| 45 | (Iran) Mahdi Gholami Orimi | 2521 | 1 (B 249) | 0 (W 11) | 1 (B 215) | 0 (W 48) | 0 (B 173) | 1 (W 136) | 0 (B 153) | ½ (W 211) | ½ (B 193) | 1 (W 161) | 1 (B 148) | 1 (W 84) | 0 (B 9) | ½ (B 128) | 1 (W 75) | 0 (W 43) | 1 (B 118) | 1 (W 83) | 1 (B 81) | 11.5 | 177.5 | 182 | 2505 |
| 46 | (FIDE) Arseniy Nesterov | 2531 | 1 (W 237) | 1 (B 78) | 0 (W 23) | 0 (B 7) | ½ (W 166) | ½ (W 62) | 0 (B 37) | 1 (B 177) | ½ (W 171) | 0 (B 146) | 1 (W 204) | 1 (W 160) | 0 (B 122) | 1 (B 192) | 1 (W 147) | 1 (B 141) | 0 (W 76) | 1 (B 75) | 1 (W 74) | 11.5 | 177 | 183.5 | 2528 |
| 47 | (India) Pranav V | 2606 | 1 (B 106) | 1 (W 19) | 1 (B 99) | 0 (W 1) | 1 (B 158) | ½ (W 52) | 1 (B 13) | ½ (W 17) | 0 (B 5) | 1 (W 72) | 0 (B 55) | 1 (W 25) | 0 (B 26) | 0 (W 37) | 1 (B 125) | 0 (W 28) | 1 (B 123) | 1 (W 58) | 0 (B 22) | 11 | 208 | 217 | 2578 |
| 48 | (Georgia (country)) Baadur Jobava | 2649 | 1 (W 163) | 0 (B 157) | 1 (W 101) | 1 (B 45) | 0 (W 69) | 1 (B 152) | 1 (W 24) | ½ (B 63) | 1 (W 36) | ½ (B 6) | 1 (W 120) | ½ (B 21) | 1 (W 16) | 0 (W 5) | 1 (B 15) | 0 (B 14) | ½ (W 9) | 0 (W 28) | 0 (B 25) | 11 | 207 | 216 | 2594 |
| 49 | (Ukraine) Olexandr Bortnyk | 2748 | 1 (B 42) | 1 (W 66) | 1 (B 102) | 1 (W 123) | ½ (B 11) | ½ (W 3) | ½ (B 73) | ½ (W 25) | ½ (B 31) | ½ (W 14) | 0 (B 8) | 0 (W 80) | ½ (B 71) | ½ (W 82) | 0 (B 28) | 0 (B 97) | 1 (W 114) | 1 (W 145) | 1 (B 107) | 11 | 201.5 | 210.5 | 2577 |
| 50 | (India) Raunak Sadhwani | 2649 | 1 (B 196) | 1 (W 145) | 0 (B 71) | 1 (W 152) | 1 (B 66) | ½ (W 127) | 0 (B 27) | 1 (W 110) | 1 (B 89) | ½ (W 15) | ½ (B 24) | ½ (W 13) | 1 (B 91) | 1 (W 55) | 0 (B 11) | 0 (W 17) | 0 (B 28) | 1 (B 57) | 0 (W 38) | 11 | 199 | 207 | 2600 |
| 51 | (Iran) Bardiya Daneshvar | 2495 | 0 (B 17) | 1 (W 234) | ½ (B 64) | 1 (W 88) | ½ (B 30) | 0 (W 9) | 1 (B 62) | 1 (B 39) | 0 (W 75) | 0 (W 44) | ½ (B 34) | 1 (W 174) | ½ (B 43) | 1 (B 93) | 1 (W 94) | 0 (W 29) | ½ (B 73) | ½ (W 84) | 1 (B 102) | 11 | 199 | 205.5 | 2615 |
| 52 | (India) R Praggnanandhaa | 2703 | 1 (W 183) | 0 (B 69) | 1 (W 155) | 1 (B 180) | 1 (W 102) | ½ (B 47) | 1 (W 119) | ½ (B 6) | ½ (B 10) | 0 (W 31) | 1 (B 43) | 1 (W 73) | ½ (W 21) | 1 (B 120) | 0 (W 20) | 0 (B 12) | 0 (W 38) | 1 (B 95) | 0 (W 39) | 11 | 198.5 | 207 | 2605 |
| 53 | (India) Gukesh Dommaraju | 2628 | 1 (B 211) | 1 (W 178) | 0 (B 158) | 1 (W 104) | 1 (B 229) | ½ (W 17) | 0 (B 5) | 1 (W 144) | 1 (B 127) | 0 (W 10) | 1 (W 141) | 0 (B 16) | 1 (W 60) | 1 (B 7) | ½ (W 13) | 0 (B 4) | 1 (W 65) | 0 (B 19) | 0 (W 33) | 11 | 198.5 | 206 | 2618 |
| 54 | (Turkey) Ediz Gürel | 2503 | 0 (B 10) | 1 (W 236) | ½ (B 55) | 1 (W 62) | 1 (B 240) | 0 (W 27) | 0 (B 56) | 1 (W 84) | ½ (B 83) | ½ (W 29) | 1 (B 174) | 1 (W 43) | ½ (B 73) | 1 (W 30) | 0 (B 33) | 0 (W 34) | 0 (B 64) | 1 (W 132) | 1 (B 91) | 11 | 196.5 | 203 | 2646 |
| 55 | (Serbia) Alexey Sarana | 2704 | 0 (W 130) | 1 (B 208) | ½ (W 54) | ½ (B 162) | 1 (W 155) | 1 (B 92) | ½ (W 129) | 1 (B 95) | ½ (W 41) | 1 (B 93) | 1 (W 47) | 0 (B 31) | 1 (W 144) | 0 (B 50) | ½ (W 38) | 0 (B 9) | 1 (W 44) | ½ (B 32) | 0 (W 34) | 11 | 193.5 | 201 | 2566 |
| 56 | (Hungary) Richárd Rapport | 2629 | 1 (W 195) | 1 (B 130) | 0 (W 25) | 0 (B 157) | 1 (W 169) | ½ (B 124) | 1 (W 54) | 0 (B 36) | 1 (W 90) | 1 (B 60) | 0 (W 13) | 1 (B 134) | 1 (W 100) | 0 (B 16) | 1 (W 66) | 0 (B 74) | 1 (W 97) | 0 (B 21) | ½ (W 68) | 11 | 191.5 | 199.5 | 2564 |
| 57 | (Armenia) Robert Hovhannisyan | 2571 | 1 (W 216) | 0 (B 25) | 1 (W 163) | 1 (B 168) | 1 (W 33) | 0 (B 40) | ½ (W 78) | ½ (B 74) | 1 (W 191) | 0 (B 32) | 1 (W 105) | ½ (B 59) | ½ (W 70) | 0 (B 12) | 1 (W 106) | 1 (B 92) | 0 (B 22) | 0 (W 50) | 1 (B 101) | 11 | 191 | 198.5 | 2557 |
| 58 | (Vietnam) Dau Khuong Duy | 2438 | ½ (W 121) | 1 (B 8) | 1 (W 129) | 0 (B 4) | ½ (W 39) | 0 (B 63) | 1 (W 123) | 1 (B 112) | 0 (W 30) | 0 (B 95) | 1 (W 104) | ½ (B 167) | 1 (W 240) | 0 (B 60) | 1 (W 115) | ½ (B 98) | 1 (W 134) | 0 (B 47) | 1 (W 93) | 11 | 190.5 | 199 | 2597 |
| 59 | (United States) Ray Robson | 2632 | 1 (B 177) | 0 (W 152) | 0 (B 127) | 1 (W 211) | 1 (B 116) | ½ (W 104) | 1 (B 86) | ½ (W 71) | 1 (B 103) | 1 (W 79) | 0 (B 15) | ½ (W 57) | 1 (B 107) | 0 (W 44) | 1 (B 42) | ½ (W 89) | 0 (B 24) | 0 (B 36) | 1 (W 108) | 11 | 189 | 196.5 | 2538 |
| 60 | (Iran) Amin Tabatabaei | 2565 | 1 (B 222) | 1 (W 224) | 0 (B 1) | 1 (W 175) | 0 (B 17) | 0 (W 89) | 1 (B 206) | ½ (W 37) | 1 (B 173) | 0 (W 56) | 1 (B 179) | 1 (W 29) | 0 (B 53) | 1 (W 58) | 1 (B 81) | ½ (W 27) | 0 (B 62) | 0 (W 64) | 1 (B 106) | 11 | 189 | 196 | 2537 |
| 61 | (FIDE) Dmitry Andreikin | 2714 | 0 (W 154) | 1 (B 195) | 1 (W 138) | 1 (B 230) | 1 (W 93) | 0 (B 69) | ½ (W 95) | 1 (B 129) | ½ (W 73) | 0 (B 41) | 1 (W 67) | 0 (B 38) | ½ (W 119) | 0 (B 66) | 1 (W 124) | ½ (B 68) | 1 (W 108) | 1 (B 63) | 0 (W 32) | 11 | 186 | 193 | 2555 |
| 62 | (Azerbaijan) Shakhriyar Mamedyarov | 2656 | 0 (W 190) | ½ (B 204) | 1 (W 161) | 0 (B 54) | 1 (W 100) | ½ (B 46) | 0 (W 51) | 1 (B 133) | 1 (W 101) | 1 (B 150) | 1 (W 69) | ½ (B 119) | ½ (W 94) | 0 (B 92) | 1 (W 36) | 1 (B 134) | 1 (W 60) | 0 (W 24) | 0 (B 37) | 11 | 185.5 | 193 | 2503 |
| 63 | (Georgia (country)) Levan Pantsulaia | 2572 | 1 (B 217) | 0 (W 158) | ½ (B 177) | ½ (W 160) | 1 (B 219) | 1 (W 58) | 1 (B 81) | ½ (W 48) | 0 (B 14) | 0 (W 144) | 1 (B 130) | ½ (W 83) | 0 (B 19) | 1 (W 103) | 1 (B 122) | 1 (W 25) | 0 (B 33) | 0 (W 61) | 1 (B 104) | 11 | 185 | 192 | 2524 |
| 64 | (United States) Leinier Domínguez | 2627 | 1 (W 208) | 0 (B 188) | ½ (W 51) | 0 (B 72) | 1 (W 195) | 1 (B 167) | 1 (W 42) | 1 (B 124) | ½ (W 69) | 0 (B 120) | 0 (W 100) | ½ (B 90) | 0 (W 92) | 1 (B 133) | ½ (W 142) | 1 (B 138) | 1 (W 54) | 1 (B 60) | 0 (W 35) | 11 | 179 | 186.5 | 2499 |
| 65 | (Uzbekistan) Nodirbek Yakubboev | 2564 | 1 (B 236) | 1 (W 245) | ½ (W 141) | ½ (B 33) | 0 (W 7) | 0 (B 144) | 0 (W 148) | 1 (B 196) | ½ (W 97) | 1 (B 171) | 0 (W 146) | 1 (B 229) | 1 (W 189) | ½ (W 25) | 1 (B 83) | 1 (W 73) | 0 (B 53) | 0 (B 34) | 1 (W 89) | 11 | 176 | 181 | 2507 |
| 66 | (China) Bai Jinshi | 2537 | 1 (W 200) | 0 (B 49) | 1 (W 198) | 1 (B 74) | 0 (W 50) | ½ (B 147) | 0 (W 141) | 0 (B 146) | ½ (W 204) | 1 (B 190) | 1 (W 177) | 1 (B 191) | ½ (W 40) | 1 (W 61) | 0 (B 56) | 0 (B 70) | ½ (W 78) | 1 (B 142) | 1 (W 98) | 11 | 174 | 181.5 | 2554 |
| 67 | (FIDE) Ivan Zemlyanskii | 2570 | 0 (W 120) | 0 (B 251) | 1 (W 234) | 0 (B 97) | 1 (W 200) | 1 (B 231) | 1 (W 87) | 0 (B 142) | 1 (W 190) | 1 (B 189) | 0 (B 61) | 1 (W 77) | 1 (B 188) | 0 (W 33) | 0 (B 25) | 0 (W 122) | 1 (B 103) | 1 (W 92) | 1 (W 100) | 11 | 170 | 176.5 | 2453 |
| 68 | (Spain) David Antón Guijarro | 2560 | 1 (B 235) | 0 (W 10) | 0 (B 175) | 0 (W 192) | 1 (B 193) | ½ (W 219) | 0 (B 106) | 1 (W 232) | ½ (B 199) | 0 (W 148) | 1 (B 153) | 1 (W 179) | 1 (B 176) | 1 (W 188) | ½ (B 30) | ½ (W 61) | ½ (B 81) | 1 (W 99) | ½ (B 56) | 11 | 166 | 172.5 | 2477 |
| 69 | (Kazakhstan) Denis Makhnev | 2532 | 1 (B 215) | 1 (W 52) | 1 (B 22) | 0 (W 11) | 1 (B 48) | 1 (W 61) | 0 (B 1) | ½ (W 14) | ½ (B 64) | 0 (W 30) | 0 (B 62) | 1 (W 99) | 1 (B 83) | 0 (W 23) | 0 (B 34) | 0 (W 81) | 1 (B 188) | 1 (W 105) | ½ (B 84) | 10.5 | 202.5 | 210 | 2616 |
| 70 | (Serbia) Aleksandar Inđić | 2669 | 1 (B 229) | ½ (W 28) | ½ (B 86) | 1 (W 117) | 1 (B 132) | ½ (W 29) | ½ (B 10) | 1 (W 98) | 1 (B 27) | 0 (W 2) | ½ (B 73) | 0 (W 89) | ½ (B 57) | 0 (W 9) | ½ (B 102) | 1 (W 66) | 0 (B 43) | 1 (W 79) | 0 (B 42) | 10.5 | 201.5 | 209 | 2591 |
| 71 | (India) Bharath Subramaniyam | 2514 | 1 (B 250) | 1 (W 83) | 1 (W 50) | 0 (B 23) | 0 (W 12) | 1 (B 76) | ½ (W 7) | ½ (B 59) | 1 (W 74) | 0 (B 8) | 1 (W 35) | 0 (B 32) | ½ (W 49) | 0 (B 40) | ½ (W 135) | 0 (B 39) | 1 (W 149) | ½ (B 78) | 1 (W 121) | 10.5 | 201 | 205 | 2638 |
| 72 | (Argentina) Faustino Oro | 2503 | 1 (B 27) | ½ (W 84) | 0 (B 30) | 1 (W 64) | 1 (B 131) | 0 (W 2) | ½ (W 94) | 1 (B 76) | 1 (W 40) | 0 (B 47) | 0 (W 80) | 1 (B 39) | 0 (W 74) | 1 (B 205) | ½ (W 98) | 1 (B 121) | 0 (W 32) | 0 (B 44) | 1 (W 135) | 10.5 | 197.5 | 205 | 2639 |
| 73 | (Azerbaijan) Eltaj Safarli | 2623 | 1 (W 171) | 1 (B 190) | ½ (W 120) | ½ (W 10) | 1 (B 99) | 1 (B 7) | ½ (W 49) | 0 (W 2) | ½ (B 61) | 1 (B 92) | ½ (W 70) | 0 (B 52) | ½ (W 54) | ½ (B 119) | ½ (W 134) | 0 (B 65) | ½ (W 51) | 1 (B 90) | 0 (W 36) | 10.5 | 195 | 203 | 2576 |
| 74 | (United States) Samuel Sevian | 2714 | 0 (B 19) | 1 (W 199) | 1 (B 111) | 0 (W 66) | 1 (B 232) | 1 (W 151) | ½ (B 43) | ½ (W 57) | 0 (B 71) | 1 (W 152) | 1 (B 79) | 0 (W 18) | 1 (B 72) | 1 (W 89) | ½ (B 24) | 1 (W 56) | 0 (B 12) | 0 (W 31) | 0 (B 46) | 10.5 | 195 | 201.5 | 2536 |
| 75 | (India) Pentala Harikrishna | 2631 | 1 (B 160) | 1 (W 104) | ½ (B 90) | 1 (W 79) | ½ (B 98) | ½ (W 10) | ½ (B 2) | 0 (W 22) | 1 (B 51) | ½ (W 28) | 0 (B 89) | 0 (W 107) | 1 (B 152) | 0 (W 42) | 0 (B 45) | 1 (W 178) | 1 (B 125) | 0 (W 46) | 1 (B 123) | 10.5 | 193.5 | 202 | 2557 |
| 76 | (Spain) Eduardo Iturrizaga Bonelli | 2630 | 1 (B 219) | 1 (W 125) | 1 (B 37) | 0 (W 15) | 0 (B 127) | 0 (W 71) | 1 (B 85) | 0 (W 72) | 1 (B 111) | ½ (W 169) | 0 (B 42) | 0 (W 103) | 1 (B 110) | 1 (W 130) | 1 (B 152) | 1 (W 77) | 1 (B 46) | 0 (W 23) | 0 (B 43) | 10.5 | 189 | 196 | 2526 |
| 77 | (FIDE) Maksim Tsaruk | 2470 | ½ (W 35) | 0 (B 33) | 0 (W 6) | 1 (B 222) | 1 (W 108) | 1 (W 159) | ½ (B 18) | ½ (B 94) | ½ (W 95) | 1 (B 205) | 0 (W 38) | 0 (B 67) | ½ (W 186) | 1 (B 156) | 1 (W 129) | 0 (B 76) | 1 (W 135) | 1 (B 113) | 0 (W 41) | 10.5 | 188 | 195 | 2607 |
| 78 | (Netherlands) Anish Giri | 2701 | 1 (B 127) | 0 (W 46) | 1 (B 103) | ½ (W 28) | ½ (B 90) | 1 (W 180) | ½ (B 57) | 0 (W 79) | ½ (B 104) | ½ (W 42) | 1 (B 86) | 1 (W 132) | 0 (B 44) | 0 (W 145) | 1 (B 144) | 0 (W 82) | ½ (B 66) | ½ (W 71) | 1 (W 97) | 10.5 | 187.5 | 196 | 2526 |
| 79 | (FIDE) Pavel Ponkratov | 2542 | 1 (W 214) | 1 (B 4) | ½ (W 21) | 0 (B 75) | 0 (W 16) | 1 (B 204) | 1 (W 147) | 1 (B 78) | ½ (W 35) | 0 (B 59) | 0 (W 74) | ½ (B 189) | 1 (W 192) | 0 (B 141) | 0 (W 90) | 1 (B 146) | 1 (W 119) | 0 (B 70) | 1 (W 127) | 10.5 | 182.5 | 190 | 2570 |
| 80 | (FIDE) Rudik Makarian | 2601 | 0 (B 153) | 1 (W 192) | 0 (B 229) | 0 (W 136) | 1 (B 224) | 1 (W 176) | 1 (B 196) | 1 (B 126) | 1 (W 150) | 0 (W 17) | 1 (B 72) | 1 (B 49) | 0 (W 4) | 1 (W 144) | 0 (B 3) | 0 (W 37) | 1 (B 122) | 0 (W 25) | ½ (B 82) | 10.5 | 182.5 | 189.5 | 2525 |
| 81 | (Iran) Parham Maghsoodloo | 2690 | 0 (W 188) | ½ (B 171) | 1 (W 189) | ½ (B 150) | 1 (W 114) | 1 (B 143) | 0 (W 63) | 1 (B 203) | 0 (W 93) | 1 (B 104) | 0 (W 36) | 1 (B 146) | 1 (W 123) | 0 (B 41) | 0 (W 60) | 1 (B 69) | ½ (W 68) | 1 (B 89) | 0 (W 45) | 10.5 | 179.5 | 187 | 2511 |
| 82 | (Netherlands) Max Warmerdam | 2552 | 1 (W 210) | 0 (B 13) | 1 (W 148) | ½ (B 16) | 0 (W 141) | 0 (B 166) | 0 (W 137) | 0 (B 172) | 1 (W 222) | 1 (B 183) | 1 (W 171) | 1 (B 133) | 1 (W 146) | ½ (B 49) | ½ (W 32) | 1 (B 78) | 0 (W 40) | ½ (B 97) | ½ (W 80) | 10.5 | 178.5 | 185.5 | 2538 |
| 83 | (Germany) Rasmus Svane | 2638 | 1 (W 231) | 0 (B 71) | 0 (W 96) | 1 (W 218) | 0 (B 111) | 1 (B 163) | ½ (W 130) | 1 (B 138) | ½ (W 54) | ½ (W 103) | 1 (B 145) | ½ (B 63) | 0 (W 69) | 1 (B 108) | 0 (W 65) | 1 (B 150) | ½ (W 90) | 0 (B 45) | 1 (W 124) | 10.5 | 178.5 | 185.5 | 2511 |
| 84 | (Ukraine) Vasyl Ivanchuk | 2631 | 1 (W 198) | ½ (B 72) | 1 (W 167) | 0 (B 119) | 0 (W 96) | 0 (B 42) | 1 (W 140) | 0 (B 54) | 1 (W 109) | ½ (B 188) | 1 (W 101) | 0 (B 45) | 1 (W 190) | ½ (B 90) | 0 (W 97) | 1 (B 149) | 1 (W 124) | ½ (B 51) | ½ (W 69) | 10.5 | 178 | 186 | 2491 |
| 85 | (United States) Andrew Hong | 2495 | 0 (W 21) | 1 (B 233) | 0 (W 7) | 0 (B 147) | 1 (W 234) | 1 (B 207) | 0 (W 76) | 1 (B 194) | 1 (W 156) | ½ (W 98) | ½ (B 102) | ½ (B 205) | 1 (W 129) | 0 (B 134) | 0 (W 113) | 1 (B 159) | 1 (W 128) | 1 (B 94) | 0 (W 44) | 10.5 | 172 | 178.5 | 2527 |
| 86 | (Vietnam) Nguyễn Ngọc Trường Sơn | 2527 | ½ (B 218) | 1 (W 220) | ½ (W 70) | 0 (B 35) | 1 (W 168) | ½ (B 33) | 0 (W 59) | 1 (B 147) | 1 (W 203) | 0 (B 121) | 0 (W 78) | 0 (B 97) | 0 (W 166) | 1 (B 137) | 0 (W 176) | 1 (B 231) | 1 (W 153) | 1 (B 126) | 1 (W 128) | 10.5 | 169.5 | 176.5 | 2488 |
| 87 | (India) Sankalp Gupta | 2453 | 0 (B 32) | 1 (W 249) | 0 (B 132) | 0 (W 215) | 1 (B 214) | 1 (W 88) | 0 (B 67) | 0 (W 151) | 1 (B 181) | 0 (W 178) | 1 (B 220) | 0 (W 117) | 1 (B 197) | 1 (W 185) | 0 (W 108) | 1 (B 111) | ½ (B 143) | 1 (W 174) | 1 (B 145) | 10.5 | 164 | 168.5 | 2459 |
| 88 | (Vietnam) Lê Tuấn Minh | 2600 | 0 (W 168) | 1 (B 216) | ½ (W 92) | 0 (B 51) | ½ (W 171) | 0 (B 87) | 1 (W 182) | 0 (B 190) | 0 (W 198) | 1 (B 221) | 0 (W 199) | 1 (B 236) | 1 (W 177) | ½ (B 176) | 1 (B 169) | 1 (W 152) | 1 (B 110) | 0 (W 42) | 1 (B 125) | 10.5 | 161 | 167.5 | 2443 |
| 89 | (Kazakhstan) Edgar Mamedov | 2388 | 1 (B 197) | ½ (W 36) | ½ (W 24) | 0 (B 102) | 1 (W 115) | 1 (B 60) | 1 (W 34) | ½ (B 35) | 0 (W 50) | 1 (B 9) | 1 (W 75) | 1 (B 70) | 0 (W 6) | 0 (B 74) | 1 (W 121) | ½ (B 59) | 0 (B 29) | 0 (W 81) | 0 (B 65) | 10 | 201.5 | 209.5 | 2627 |
| 90 | (FIDE) Sergei Lobanov | 2500 | 1 (W 16) | 1 (B 39) | ½ (W 75) | 0 (B 121) | ½ (W 78) | 1 (B 156) | 0 (B 14) | ½ (W 13) | 0 (B 56) | 1 (W 173) | ½ (B 113) | ½ (W 64) | ½ (B 29) | ½ (W 84) | 1 (B 79) | ½ (W 102) | ½ (B 83) | 0 (W 73) | ½ (B 118) | 10 | 195 | 203.5 | 2630 |
| 91 | (Sweden) Nils Grandelius | 2573 | 1 (B 139) | 1 (W 153) | 0 (W 13) | 1 (B 231) | ½ (W 20) | 0 (B 16) | 0 (W 110) | 1 (B 122) | 1 (W 166) | ½ (B 119) | 1 (W 92) | 1 (B 40) | 0 (W 50) | 1 (B 32) | 0 (W 17) | 1 (B 120) | 0 (W 15) | 0 (B 35) | 0 (W 54) | 10 | 195 | 202.5 | 2575 |
| 92 | (Iran) Sina Movahed | 2475 | 0 (B 26) | 1 (W 181) | ½ (B 88) | 1 (W 38) | 1 (B 159) | 0 (W 55) | 1 (B 131) | ½ (W 29) | 1 (B 98) | 0 (W 73) | 0 (B 91) | 1 (W 113) | 1 (B 64) | 1 (W 62) | 0 (B 31) | 0 (W 57) | 0 (W 95) | 0 (B 67) | 1 (W 150) | 10 | 192 | 200.5 | 2604 |
| 93 | (Azerbaijan) Mahammad Muradli | 2569 | 1 (B 173) | 1 (W 175) | ½ (B 10) | ½ (W 17) | 0 (B 61) | 1 (W 158) | 1 (B 26) | 0 (W 32) | 1 (B 81) | 0 (W 55) | 0 (B 33) | 1 (W 176) | 0 (B 37) | 0 (W 51) | 1 (B 190) | 1 (W 188) | 0 (B 25) | 1 (W 122) | 0 (B 58) | 10 | 191.5 | 199.5 | 2560 |
| 94 | (Iceland) Vignir Vatnar Stefansson | 2599 | 0 (B 158) | 0 (W 144) | 1 (B 235) | 1 (W 106) | ½ (B 42) | 1 (W 122) | ½ (B 72) | ½ (W 77) | 1 (B 110) | ½ (W 127) | 1 (B 37) | ½ (W 33) | ½ (B 62) | 0 (W 19) | 0 (B 51) | ½ (W 109) | 1 (B 176) | 0 (W 85) | ½ (B 116) | 10 | 187 | 193.5 | 2490 |
| 95 | (FIDE) Aleksandr Shimanov | 2583 | 0 (B 105) | 1 (W 217) | 1 (B 206) | 1 (W 37) | 0 (B 5) | 1 (W 196) | ½ (B 61) | 0 (W 55) | ½ (B 77) | 1 (W 58) | 0 (B 25) | 0 (W 19) | 1 (B 154) | 0 (W 125) | 1 (B 96) | 1 (W 114) | 1 (B 92) | 0 (W 52) | (0)}} | 10 | 185.5 | 195 | 2510 |
| 96 | (FIDE) Savva Vetokhin | 2497 | 0 (B 5) | 1 (W 201) | 1 (B 83) | ½ (W 131) | 1 (B 84) | ½ (W 14) | 0 (B 30) | 0 (W 26) | 1 (W 39) | 0 (B 40) | 0 (W 205) | ½ (B 149) | 1 (W 172) | ½ (B 35) | 0 (W 95) | 0 (B 182) | 1 (W 192) | 1 (B 166) | 1 (W 156) | 10 | 185.5 | 193 | 2560 |
| 97 | (Serbia) Kirill Klukin | 2440 | 0 (B 30) | 1 (W 247) | 0 (B 151) | 1 (W 67) | 1 (B 118) | ½ (W 186) | ½ (B 102) | 0 (W 18) | ½ (B 65) | 0 (W 174) | 1 (B 131) | 1 (W 86) | 1 (B 132) | 0 (W 107) | 1 (B 84) | 1 (W 49) | 0 (B 56) | ½ (W 82) | 0 (B 78) | 10 | 185.5 | 190.5 | 2592 |
| 98 | (Armenia) Shant Sargsyan | 2595 | 1 (W 204) | ½ (B 142) | 1 (W 166) | 1 (B 141) | ½ (W 75) | 0 (B 35) | 1 (W 188) | 0 (B 70) | 0 (W 92) | ½ (B 85) | 1 (B 125) | 0 (W 42) | ½ (B 103) | 1 (W 111) | ½ (B 72) | ½ (W 58) | 0 (B 106) | 1 (W 109) | 0 (B 66) | 10 | 182 | 189.5 | 2521 |
| 99 | (Kazakhstan) Mark Smirnov | 2316 | 1 (B 113) | 1 (W 240) | 0 (W 47) | 1 (B 107) | 0 (W 73) | 1 (B 123) | ½ (W 41) | ½ (B 8) | 0 (W 141) | 0 (B 167) | 1 (W 150) | 0 (B 69) | ½ (W 115) | 0 (B 124) | 1 (W 140) | 1 (B 205) | 1 (W 129) | 0 (B 68) | ½ (W 112) | 10 | 181.5 | 189 | 2580 |
| 100 | (India) Leon Luke Mendonca | 2483 | ½ (B 240) | 0 (W 29) | 0 (B 218) | 1 (W 149) | 0 (B 62) | ½ (W 194) | 1 (B 212) | 1 (W 139) | 1 (B 131) | 1 (W 197) | 1 (B 64) | ½ (W 44) | 0 (B 56) | ½ (W 102) | ½ (B 43) | 1 (W 113) | 0 (B 30) | ½ (W 107) | 0 (B 67) | 10 | 181.5 | 188.5 | 2533 |
| 101 | (Uzbekistan) Mukhammadzokhid Suyarov | 2499 | 0 (B 1) | 1 (W 235) | 0 (B 48) | 1 (W 224) | 0 (B 26) | 1 (W 175) | 0 (B 105) | 1 (W 158) | 0 (B 62) | 1 (W 193) | 0 (B 84) | 1 (W 173) | 0 (W 39) | 1 (B 168) | 0 (W 35) | 1 (B 161) | 1 (W 156) | 1 (B 134) | 0 (W 57) | 10 | 181.5 | 188 | 2519 |
| 102 | (Greece) Nikolas Theodorou | 2564 | 1 (W 172) | 1 (B 182) | 0 (W 49) | 1 (W 89) | 0 (B 52) | ½ (B 203) | ½ (W 97) | 1 (B 168) | 0 (W 16) | ½ (B 192) | ½ (W 85) | 1 (B 142) | ½ (W 143) | ½ (B 100) | ½ (W 70) | ½ (B 90) | 0 (W 39) | 1 (B 115) | 0 (W 51) | 10 | 180 | 187.5 | 2519 |
| 103 | (Romania) David Gavrilescu | 2496 | 0 (W 141) | 1 (B 237) | 0 (W 78) | 0 (B 191) | 1 (W 201) | 1 (B 182) | 1 (W 170) | 1 (B 34) | 0 (W 59) | ½ (B 83) | 0 (W 9) | 1 (B 76) | ½ (W 98) | 0 (B 63) | 0 (W 39) | 1 (B 193) | 0 (W 67) | 1 (B 149) | 1 (W 159) | 10 | 180 | 186.5 | 2526 |
| 104 | (Poland) Jakub Kosakowski | 2515 | 1 (W 238) | 0 (B 75) | 1 (W 200) | 0 (B 53) | 1 (W 191) | ½ (B 59) | 1 (W 33) | 0 (B 7) | ½ (W 78) | 0 (W 81) | 0 (B 58) | 1 (B 177) | 1 (W 168) | ½ (B 135) | 0 (W 128) | ½ (B 156) | 1 (W 182) | 1 (B 141) | 0 (W 63) | 10 | 179.5 | 186 | 2553 |
| 105 | (Singapore) Siddharth Jagadeesh | 2376 | 1 (W 95) | 1 (B 112) | 0 (W 34) | 0 (W 132) | 1 (B 117) | 0 (B 24) | 1 (W 101) | 0 (B 150) | 1 (W 178) | 1 (W 240) | 0 (B 57) | 0 (B 123) | 0 (W 108) | 1 (B 155) | 0 (W 138) | 1 (B 213) | 1 (W 162) | 0 (B 69) | 1 (W 157) | 10 | 178 | 185.5 | 2550 |
| 106 | (Kazakhstan) Zhandos Agmanov | 2408 | 0 (W 47) | 0 (B 12) | 1 (W 246) | 0 (B 94) | 1 (W 233) | ½ (B 138) | 1 (W 68) | 0 (B 167) | 1 (W 162) | 0 (B 124) | 1 (W 157) | ½ (B 109) | 1 (W 230) | 1 (B 123) | 0 (B 57) | 1 (W 132) | 1 (W 98) | 0 (B 39) | 0 (W 60) | 10 | 176.5 | 181.5 | 2532 |
| 107 | (Turkey) Vahap Şanal | 2563 | 1 (B 212) | 0 (W 15) | 1 (B 153) | 0 (W 99) | ½ (B 160) | 1 (W 218) | 0 (W 173) | 0 (B 189) | 1 (W 231) | 1 (B 166) | 1 (W 172) | 1 (B 75) | 0 (W 59) | 1 (B 97) | 0 (W 7) | 1 (B 119) | 0 (W 23) | ½ (B 100) | 0 (W 49) | 10 | 176 | 183 | 2490 |
| 108 | (India) Abhimanyu Puranik | 2537 | 1 (B 181) | ½ (W 17) | 0 (B 2) | 0 (W 232) | 0 (B 77) | ½ (W 161) | 0 (B 139) | 1 (W 214) | 1 (B 218) | 1 (W 153) | 0 (B 176) | 1 (W 206) | 1 (B 105) | 0 (W 83) | 1 (B 87) | 1 (W 144) | 0 (B 61) | 1 (W 120) | 0 (B 59) | 10 | 175 | 181.5 | 2450 |
| 109 | (Kazakhstan) Aldiyar Ansat | 2510 | 1 (W 252) | 0 (B 34) | 0 (W 16) | 1 (B 202) | 0 (W 147) | ½ (B 137) | 1 (W 204) | 0 (B 33) | 0 (B 84) | 1 (W 218) | 1 (B 175) | ½ (W 106) | 1 (B 181) | 0 (W 29) | 1 (W 191) | ½ (B 94) | ½ (W 121) | 0 (B 98) | 1 (W 163) | 10 | 173.5 | 176.5 | 2466 |
| 110 | (Switzerland) Gabriel Gaehwiler | 2468 | 0 (W 23) | 1 (B 225) | 0 (W 41) | ½ (B 200) | 1 (W 213) | 1 (W 197) | 1 (B 91) | 0 (B 50) | 0 (W 94) | 0 (B 134) | 0 (W 135) | 1 (B 112) | 0 (W 76) | 1 (W 174) | 1 (B 180) | 1 (B 151) | 0 (W 88) | 1 (B 143) | ½ (W 113) | 10 | 173 | 180 | 2561 |
| 111 | (France) Marco Materia | 2510 | 0 (W 3) | 1 (B 214) | 0 (W 74) | 1 (B 137) | 1 (W 83) | 0 (B 39) | 0 (W 191) | 1 (B 208) | 0 (W 76) | 0 (B 177) | 1 (W 139) | 1 (B 203) | 1 (W 193) | 0 (B 98) | 0 (W 149) | 0 (W 87) | 1 (B 195) | 1 (B 189) | 1 (W 147) | 10 | 170 | 177.5 | 2482 |
| 112 | (Iran) Pouya Idani | 2568 | 1 (B 193) | 0 (W 105) | 0 (B 219) | 1 (W 153) | 1 (B 177) | 1 (W 192) | 0 (B 22) | 0 (W 58) | ½ (B 19) | 0 (W 160) | 0 (B 195) | 0 (W 110) | 0 (B 136) | 1 (W 235) | 1 (B 181) | 1 (W 158) | 1 (B 130) | 1 (W 176) | ½ (B 99) | 10 | 168 | 174.5 | 2425 |
| 113 | (FIDE) Klementy Sychev | 2568 | 0 (W 99) | ½ (B 210) | 1 (W 221) | ½ (B 170) | 0 (W 148) | 1 (B 198) | 1 (W 208) | ½ (B 166) | 1 (W 146) | 0 (B 141) | ½ (W 90) | 0 (B 92) | ½ (W 142) | (231b+)}} | 1 (B 85) | 0 (B 100) | 1 (W 167) | 0 (W 77) | ½ (B 110) | 10 | 163 | 169.5 | 2437 |
| 114 | (FIDE) Aleksey Grebnev | 2502 | 0 (B 2) | 0 (W 212) | 1 (B 242) | 1 (W 217) | 0 (B 81) | 0 (W 179) | 1 (W 214) | 0 (B 170) | 1 (W 201) | 1 (B 168) | ½ (W 156) | ½ (B 240) | 0 (W 128) | 1 (B 203) | 1 (W 193) | 0 (B 95) | 0 (B 49) | 1 (W 161) | 1 (B 151) | 10 | 163 | 169 | 2479 |
| 115 | (Chile) Cristobal Henriquez Villagra | 2531 | 1 (B 228) | 0 (W 26) | 1 (B 224) | 0 (W 22) | 0 (B 89) | 0 (W 199) | ½ (B 207) | 0 (W 218) | ½ (B 217) | 1 (W 235) | 1 (B 161) | 1 (W 148) | ½ (B 99) | 1 (W 146) | 0 (B 58) | ½ (W 127) | 1 (B 190) | 0 (W 102) | 1 (B 144) | 10 | 162.5 | 169 | 2415 |
| 116 | (Canada) Shawn Rodrigue-Lemieux | 2506 | 0 (W 13) | 0 (B 200) | 1 (W 214) | 1 (B 182) | 0 (W 59) | 0 (B 170) | 1 (W 201) | ½ (B 202) | 1 (W 135) | 0 (B 172) | 1 (W 137) | 0 (B 192) | ½ (W 149) | 0 (B 163) | 1 (W 203) | 1 (B 166) | 1 (W 189) | ½ (B 121) | ½ (W 94) | 10 | 161.5 | 169 | 2444 |
| 117 | (Romania) Alexander Motylev | 2524 | 1 (W 246) | 0 (B 40) | 1 (W 147) | 0 (B 70) | 0 (W 105) | 0 (B 168) | ½ (W 172) | 1 (B 241) | 1 (W 202) | ½ (B 203) | 0 (W 142) | 1 (B 87) | 0 (W 191) | 0 (B 190) | 1 (W 198) | ½ (W 148) | 1 (B 204) | ½ (B 159) | 1 (W 154) | 10 | 157.5 | 162.5 | 2423 |
| 118 | (Uzbekistan) Jakhongir Vakhidov | 2554 | ½ (W 221) | 0 (B 170) | 1 (W 210) | ½ (B 207) | 0 (W 97) | 0 (B 208) | 0 (W 149) | 1 (B 234) | 1 (W 216) | 0 (B 126) | 0 (W 168) | 1 (B 201) | ½ (W 198) | 1 (B 171) | 1 (W 133) | 1 (B 147) | 0 (W 45) | 1 (B 119) | ½ (W 90) | 10 | 156.5 | 163 | 2386 |
| 119 | (Kazakhstan) Arystan Isanzhulov | 2403 | ½ (B 38) | 1 (W 43) | 1 (B 36) | 1 (W 84) | 1 (B 14) | 0 (W 15) | 0 (B 52) | 1 (W 9) | 0 (B 26) | ½ (W 91) | 1 (B 186) | ½ (W 62) | ½ (B 61) | ½ (W 73) | 0 (B 18) | 0 (W 107) | 0 (B 79) | 0 (W 118) | 1 (B 184) | 9.5 | 201 | 209.5 | 2621 |
| 120 | (India) Goutham Krishna H | 2336 | 1 (B 67) | 1 (W 132) | ½ (B 73) | 1 (W 30) | ½ (W 121) | 0 (B 6) | 1 (W 39) | 0 (B 12) | 1 (B 186) | 1 (W 64) | 0 (B 48) | 1 (W 141) | 1 (B 23) | 0 (W 52) | 0 (B 8) | 0 (W 91) | 0 (W 36) | 0 (B 108) | ½ (W 138) | 9.5 | 199 | 207.5 | 2628 |
| 121 | (Spain) Alan Pichot | 2629 | ½ (B 58) | 1 (W 189) | 1 (B 154) | 1 (W 90) | ½ (B 120) | ½ (W 5) | 0 (B 17) | 0 (W 127) | 1 (B 130) | 1 (W 86) | 0 (B 144) | 1 (W 28) | 1 (B 42) | 0 (W 15) | 0 (B 89) | 0 (W 72) | ½ (B 109) | ½ (W 116) | 0 (B 71) | 9.5 | 190.5 | 198.5 | 2526 |
| 122 | (FIDE) Lev Zverev | 2479 | ½ (W 33) | 0 (B 35) | 1 (W 194) | 0 (B 39) | 1 (W 174) | 0 (B 94) | 1 (W 135) | 0 (W 91) | 1 (B 159) | 0 (B 129) | 1 (W 147) | 1 (B 156) | 1 (W 46) | ½ (B 36) | 0 (W 63) | 1 (B 67) | 0 (W 80) | 0 (B 93) | ½ (W 134) | 9.5 | 186 | 194 | 2575 |
| 123 | (Chile) Pablo Salinas Herrera | 2541 | 1 (B 242) | 1 (W 5) | 1 (B 26) | 0 (B 49) | 0 (W 35) | 0 (W 99) | 0 (B 58) | 1 (W 206) | 1 (B 148) | 0 (W 37) | 1 (B 126) | 1 (W 105) | 0 (B 81) | 0 (W 106) | 1 (W 163) | 1 (B 189) | 0 (W 47) | ½ (B 127) | 0 (W 75) | 9.5 | 185.5 | 191.5 | 2525 |
| 124 | (Hungary) Ádám Kozák | 2516 | 1 (B 239) | 0 (W 32) | 1 (B 245) | 0 (W 31) | 1 (B 181) | ½ (W 56) | 1 (B 240) | 0 (W 64) | 0 (B 13) | 1 (W 106) | 0 (B 29) | 1 (W 195) | 0 (B 34) | 1 (W 99) | 0 (B 61) | 1 (W 186) | 0 (B 84) | 1 (W 131) | 0 (B 83) | 9.5 | 184.5 | 189.5 | 2538 |
| 125 | (Uzbekistan) Mukhiddin Madaminov | 2514 | 1 (W 244) | 0 (B 76) | 1 (W 226) | 1 (W 44) | ½ (B 31) | 0 (B 20) | 0 (W 8) | 1 (W 240) | 0 (B 33) | 1 (B 149) | 0 (W 98) | 1 (B 172) | ½ (W 205) | 1 (B 95) | 0 (W 47) | ½ (B 135) | 0 (W 75) | 1 (B 129) | 0 (W 88) | 9.5 | 183.5 | 189.5 | 2554 |
| 126 | (Kazakhstan) Daniyal Sapenov | 2478 | 1 (W 7) | 0 (B 131) | ½ (W 39) | 1 (B 174) | 1 (W 8) | ½ (B 34) | 0 (B 31) | 0 (W 80) | 0 (B 197) | 1 (W 118) | 0 (W 123) | 0 (B 128) | 1 (W 170) | 0 (B 149) | ½ (B 158) | 1 (W 207) | 1 (B 186) | 0 (W 86) | 1 (B 173) | 9.5 | 181.5 | 189 | 2546 |
| 127 | (Bosnia and Herzegovina) Bojan Maksimović | 2485 | 0 (W 78) | 1 (B 187) | 1 (W 59) | 1 (B 156) | 1 (W 76) | ½ (B 50) | 0 (W 20) | 1 (B 121) | 0 (W 53) | ½ (B 94) | 0 (W 40) | ½ (B 129) | 0 (W 134) | 1 (B 151) | 0 (W 167) | ½ (B 115) | 1 (B 184) | ½ (W 123) | 0 (B 79) | 9.5 | 181 | 189.5 | 2598 |
| 128 | (India) Aravindh Chithambaram | 2625 | 0 (B 37) | ½ (W 161) | 1 (B 179) | 1 (W 185) | 0 (B 28) | 0 (W 154) | 0 (B 19) | ½ (W 193) | 1 (B 136) | 0 (W 176) | 1 (B 211) | 1 (W 126) | 1 (B 114) | ½ (W 45) | 1 (B 104) | 0 (W 42) | 0 (B 85) | 1 (W 144) | 0 (B 86) | 9.5 | 180 | 187.5 | 2470 |
| 129 | (Uzbekistan) Shamsiddin Vokhidov | 2578 | ½ (B 149) | 1 (W 179) | 0 (B 58) | ½ (W 196) | 1 (B 206) | 1 (W 37) | ½ (B 55) | 0 (W 61) | 0 (B 144) | 1 (W 122) | ½ (B 19) | ½ (W 127) | 0 (B 85) | 1 (W 229) | 0 (B 77) | 1 (W 130) | 0 (B 99) | 0 (W 125) | 1 (B 176) | 9.5 | 177 | 184.5 | 2483 |
| 130 | (India) Surya Shekhar Ganguly | 2486 | 1 (B 55) | 0 (W 56) | 0 (B 31) | 0 (W 173) | 1 (B 212) | 1 (W 139) | ½ (B 83) | 1 (W 159) | 0 (W 121) | 1 (B 210) | 0 (W 63) | 0 (W 34) | 1 (B 195) | 0 (B 76) | 1 (W 192) | 0 (B 129) | 0 (W 112) | 1 (W 204) | 1 (B 182) | 9.5 | 173.5 | 181 | 2519 |
| 131 | (Belgium) Daniel Dardha | 2599 | 1 (B 161) | 1 (W 126) | 0 (W 3) | ½ (B 96) | 0 (W 72) | 1 (B 183) | 0 (W 92) | ½ (B 42) | 0 (W 100) | ½ (B 133) | 0 (W 97) | 0 (B 193) | 0 (W 171) | 1 (B 221) | 1 (W 137) | 1 (B 206) | 1 (W 146) | 0 (B 124) | 1 (W 142) | 9.5 | 173 | 180 | 2474 |
| 132 | (India) Adhiban Baskaran | 2563 | 1 (W 147) | 0 (B 120) | 1 (W 87) | 1 (B 105) | 0 (W 70) | ½ (B 173) | 0 (W 203) | 1 (B 229) | 1 (W 137) | 0 (B 7) | 1 (W 192) | 0 (B 78) | 0 (W 97) | 1 (B 166) | ½ (W 189) | 0 (B 106) | 1 (W 154) | 0 (B 54) | ½ (W 140) | 9.5 | 172.5 | 180 | 2465 |
| 133 | (FIDE) Mikhail Kobalia | 2469 | 0 (B 11) | 1 (W 228) | 0 (B 159) | 1 (W 236) | 0 (B 44) | 1 (W 181) | 0 (B 38) | 0 (W 62) | 1 (B 139) | ½ (W 131) | 1 (B 212) | 0 (W 82) | 1 (B 175) | 0 (W 64) | 0 (B 118) | 1 (W 197) | ½ (B 151) | ½ (W 184) | 1 (W 172) | 9.5 | 172 | 178.5 | 2493 |
| 134 | (Georgia (country)) Giga Quparadze | 2571 | 0 (B 224) | 1 (W 173) | ½ (B 160) | ½ (W 177) | 0 (B 37) | 0 (W 206) | ½ (B 175) | 1 (W 219) | 1 (B 211) | 1 (W 110) | 1 (B 169) | 0 (W 56) | 1 (B 127) | 1 (W 85) | ½ (B 73) | 0 (W 62) | 0 (B 58) | 0 (W 101) | ½ (B 122) | 9.5 | 170 | 177 | 2479 |
| 135 | (Poland) Radosław Wojtaszek | 2605 | 0 (W 203) | 0 (B 207) | ½ (B 220) | ½ (W 179) | 1 (B 217) | ½ (W 160) | 0 (B 122) | 1 (W 183) | 0 (B 116) | 1 (W 170) | 1 (B 110) | 1 (W 169) | ½ (B 28) | ½ (W 104) | ½ (B 71) | ½ (W 125) | 0 (B 77) | 1 (W 167) | 0 (B 72) | 9.5 | 166.5 | 173.5 | 2462 |
| 136 | (FIDE) Nikolay Averin | 2411 | 0 (W 39) | 0 (B 7) | 1 (W 187) | 1 (B 80) | 0 (W 24) | 0 (B 45) | 0 (W 223) | 1 (B 233) | 0 (W 128) | ½ (B 234) | ½ (W 140) | ½ (B 194) | 1 (W 112) | 0 (B 157) | 0 (W 172) | 1 (B 221) | 1 (B 230) | 1 (W 209) | 1 (B 174) | 9.5 | 165.5 | 172 | 2442 |
| 137 | (FIDE) Roman Shogdzhiev | 2384 | 0 (B 209) | 0 (W 44) | 1 (B 243) | 0 (W 111) | 1 (B 220) | ½ (W 109) | 1 (B 82) | 1 (W 184) | 0 (B 132) | 0 (W 145) | 0 (B 116) | 1 (W 180) | 0 (B 178) | 0 (W 86) | 0 (B 131) | 1 (W 212) | 1 (B 229) | 1 (W 208) | 1 (B 167) | 9.5 | 161.5 | 167.5 | 2489 |
| 138 | (Kazakhstan) Rinat Jumabayev | 2510 | 1 (B 247) | 0 (W 14) | 0 (B 61) | 0 (W 144) | 1 (B 236) | ½ (W 106) | 1 (B 232) | 0 (W 83) | 0 (B 240) | ½ (W 211) | 0 (B 170) | 1 (W 224) | 1 (B 206) | 1 (W 181) | 1 (B 105) | 0 (W 64) | 0 (B 142) | 1 (W 196) | ½ (B 120) | 9.5 | 161.5 | 166.5 | 2436 |
| 139 | (Chinese Taipei) Adelard Bai | 2358 | 0 (W 91) | 0 (B 41) | 1 (W 239) | 0 (B 155) | 1 (W 238) | 0 (B 130) | 1 (W 108) | 0 (B 100) | 0 (W 133) | 1 (B 194) | 0 (B 111) | ½ (W 220) | 0 (B 180) | ½ (W 218) | ½ (B 200) | 1 (W 215) | 1 (B 219) | 1 (W 178) | 1 (W 183) | 9.5 | 156 | 162.5 | 2365 |
| 140 | (Kosovo) Nderim Saraçi | 2509 | 0 (B 15) | ½ (W 222) | 0 (B 232) | 1 (W 245) | 0 (B 218) | 1 (W 241) | 0 (B 84) | 0 (W 210) | 0 (B 221) | 1 (W 187) | ½ (B 136) | ½ (W 235) | 1 (B 220) | 1 (W 179) | 0 (B 99) | ½ (W 195) | 1 (B 199) | 1 (W 160) | ½ (B 132) | 9.5 | 148.5 | 153.5 | 2325 |
| 141 | (United States) Hans Niemann | 2734 | 1 (B 103) | 1 (W 151) | ½ (B 65) | 0 (W 98) | 1 (B 82) | 0 (W 28) | 1 (B 66) | 0 (W 43) | 1 (B 99) | 1 (W 113) | 0 (B 53) | ½ (W 235) | 1 (B 220) | 1 (W 79) | 0 (B 19) | 0 (W 46) | ½ (B 145) | 0 (W 104) | (0)}} | 9 | 187.5 | 196.5 | 2519 |
| 142 | (FIDE) Erdem Khubukshanov | 2415 | 1 (B 31) | ½ (W 98) | 0 (B 29) | 0 (W 197) | ½ (B 38) | 1 (W 209) | 1 (B 180) | 1 (W 67) | 0 (B 18) | 0 (W 186) | 1 (B 117) | 0 (B 120) | 1 (W 167) | 1 (W 159) | ½ (B 64) | 0 (B 36) | 1 (W 138) | 0 (W 66) | 0 (B 131) | 9 | 186.5 | 194 | 2579 |
| 143 | (Kazakhstan) Kazybek Nogerbek | 2529 | 1 (B 227) | 0 (W 22) | 1 (B 212) | 1 (W 26) | 0 (B 32) | 0 (W 81) | 1 (B 199) | 0 (W 192) | 1 (B 153) | ½ (W 179) | 1 (B 160) | 0 (W 102) | ½ (B 113) | ½ (W 34) | 0 (B 29) | 0 (B 35) | ½ (W 87) | 0 (W 110) | ½ (B 146) | 9 | 185 | 192 | 2522 |
| 144 | (FIDE) Artiom Stribuk | 2385 | 0 (W 174) | 1 (B 94) | 0 (W 230) | 1 (B 138) | 1 (W 162) | 1 (W 65) | ½ (B 9) | 0 (B 53) | 1 (W 129) | 1 (B 63) | 1 (W 121) | ½ (W 9) | ½ (B 102) | 0 (B 80) | 0 (W 78) | 0 (B 108) | 1 (W 150) | 0 (B 128) | 0 (W 115) | 9 | 184.5 | 191.5 | 2593 |
| 145 | (FIDE) Aleksandr Rakhmanov | 2520 | 1 (W 225) | 0 (B 50) | 1 (W 251) | 0 (B 12) | 1 (W 170) | 0 (W 26) | 1 (B 158) | 0 (B 191) | ½ (W 149) | 1 (B 137) | 0 (W 83) | ½ (W 23) | 0 (B 55) | 1 (B 78) | 0 (W 40) | 0 (B 32) | ½ (W 141) | 0 (B 49) | 0 (W 87) | 9 | 182.5 | 189 | 2540 |
| 146 | (Kyrgyzstan) Eldiar Orozbaev | 2409 | 1 (B 44) | ½ (W 9) | 0 (B 209) | 0 (W 36) | 0 (B 184) | 1 (B 174) | 1 (W 164) | 1 (W 66) | 0 (B 113) | 1 (W 46) | 1 (B 65) | 1 (B 166) | 1 (W 35) | 0 (B 115) | 1 (W 213) | 0 (W 79) | 0 (B 131) | 1 (W 186) | ½ (W 143) | 9 | 182 | 189.5 | 2570 |
| 147 | (China) Meng Yihan | 2277 | 0 (B 132) | 1 (W 18) | 0 (B 117) | 1 (W 85) | 1 (B 109) | ½ (W 66) | 0 (B 79) | 0 (W 86) | 1 (B 180) | 0 (W 19) | 0 (B 122) | 0 (W 81) | 0 (B 82) | 1 (W 178) | 0 (B 46) | 0 (W 118) | ½ (B 209) | 1 (W 188) | 0 (B 111) | 9 | 180.5 | 188 | 2527 |
| 148 | (India) P. Iniyan | 2444 | 0 (B 14) | 1 (W 239) | 0 (B 82) | 1 (W 220) | 1 (B 113) | 0 (W 43) | 1 (B 65) | 0 (W 38) | 0 (W 123) | 1 (B 68) | 0 (W 45) | 1 (W 162) | 1 (B 169) | 1 (B 210) | 1 (W 230) | ½ (B 117) | ½ (W 157) | 0 (B 150) | 1 (W 194) | 9 | 176 | 182.5 | 2479 |
| 149 | (Armenia) Mamikon Gharibyan | 2365 | ½ (W 129) | 0 (B 156) | 0 (W 8) | 0 (B 100) | ½ (B 172) | 1 (W 251) | 1 (B 118) | 1 (W 185) | ½ (B 145) | 0 (W 125) | ½ (B 154) | 0 (B 115) | 0 (W 155) | 1 (W 126) | 1 (B 111) | 0 (W 84) | 0 (B 71) | 0 (W 103) | 1 (B 196) | 9 | 174.5 | 181 | 2512 |
| 150 | (Denmark) Jonas Buhl Bjerre | 2511 | 0 (B 245) | 1 (W 193) | ½ (B 27) | ½ (W 81) | 1 (B 215) | 1 (W 44) | 0 (B 32) | 1 (W 105) | 0 (B 80) | 0 (W 62) | 0 (B 99) | ½ (W 96) | ½ (B 116) | 1 (W 196) | 1 (B 161) | 0 (W 83) | 0 (B 144) | 1 (W 148) | 0 (B 92) | 9 | 173.5 | 178.5 | 2474 |
| 151 | (Austria) Konstantin Peyrer | 2533 | 1 (W 194) | 0 (B 141) | 1 (W 97) | 0 (B 20) | 1 (W 208) | 0 (B 74) | 0 (W 171) | 1 (B 87) | 1 (W 168) | 1 (B 191) | 0 (B 26) | 0 (W 207) | 1 (B 212) | 0 (W 127) | 1 (B 175) | 0 (W 110) | ½ (W 133) | 1 (B 172) | 0 (W 114) | 9 | 173 | 180.5 | 2482 |
| 152 | (Greece) Dimitris Alexakis | 2516 | 1 (W 226) | 1 (B 59) | 0 (W 40) | 0 (B 50) | 1 (W 207) | 0 (W 48) | 0 (B 192) | 1 (B 198) | 1 (W 170) | 0 (B 74) | 1 (W 203) | 0 (W 37) | ½ (B 207) | 1 (B 204) | 0 (W 76) | 0 (B 88) | 0 (W 172) | 1 (W 175) | ½ (B 158) | 9 | 171.5 | 178.5 | 2514 |
| 153 | (Uzbekistan) Khumoyun Begmuratov | 2406 | 1 (W 80) | 0 (B 91) | 0 (W 107) | 0 (B 112) | 1 (W 187) | 1 (B 155) | 1 (W 45) | 0 (B 24) | 0 (W 143) | 0 (B 108) | 0 (W 68) | ½ (B 35) | 0 (W 75) | 1 (W 200) | ½ (B 185) | 1 (W 180) | 0 (B 86) | ½ (W 164) | 1 (B 188) | 9 | 171.5 | 178.5 | 2479 |
| 154 | (Singapore) Tin Jingyao | 2488 | 1 (B 61) | ½ (W 30) | 0 (W 121) | 0 (B 8) | 1 (W 251) | 1 (B 128) | 0 (W 36) | ½ (B 156) | 0 (W 205) | ½ (B 204) | ½ (W 149) | 0 (B 223) | 1 (B 214) | 0 (B 193) | 1 (W 168) | 1 (B 191) | 0 (B 132) | 1 (W 194) | 0 (B 117) | 9 | 171 | 177.5 | 2504 |
| 155 | (Ukraine) Andrei Volokitin | 2503 | ½ (W 6) | ½ (B 20) | 0 (B 52) | 1 (W 139) | 0 (B 55) | 0 (W 153) | 0 (B 193) | 1 (W 200) | 1 (B 158) | ½ (W 212) | ½ (B 173) | 1 (B 170) | 0 (W 95) | 0 (W 105) | 0 (B 182) | 1 (W 222) | 0 (W 166) | 1 (B 191) | 1 (W 189) | 9 | 167 | 174 | 2434 |
| 156 | (India) Mitrabha Guha | 2592 | ½ (B 179) | 1 (W 149) | ½ (B 169) | 0 (W 127) | 1 (B 176) | 0 (W 90) | ½ (B 229) | ½ (W 154) | 0 (B 85) | 1 (W 206) | ½ (B 114) | 0 (W 181) | 1 (B 148) | 0 (W 77) | 1 (B 231) | ½ (W 104) | 0 (B 101) | 1 (W 165) | 0 (B 96) | 9 | 166.5 | 174 | 2476 |
| 157 | (Turkey) Mustafa Yılmaz | 2518 | 1 (B 243) | 1 (W 48) | 0 (B 11) | 1 (W 56) | 0 (B 22) | 0 (W 30) | 0 (B 179) | ½ (W 199) | 0 (B 210) | 1 (W 219) | 0 (B 106) | 0 (W 122) | 1 (B 160) | 1 (W 136) | 1 (B 207) | 0 (W 176) | ½ (B 148) | 1 (W 190) | 0 (B 105) | 9 | 166.5 | 172.5 | 2443 |
| 158 | (FIDE) Sergey Sklokin | 2400 | 1 (W 94) | 1 (B 63) | 1 (W 53) | 0 (B 40) | 0 (W 47) | 0 (B 93) | 0 (W 145) | 0 (B 101) | 0 (W 155) | 0 (B 214) | 0 (W 194) | 0 (W 212) | 1 (B 218) | 1 (B 223) | ½ (W 126) | 0 (B 112) | 1 (W 213) | 1 (B 180) | ½ (W 152) | 9 | 166 | 172.5 | 2469 |
| 159 | (Egypt) Bassem Amin | 2589 | 0 (W 25) | 1 (B 191) | 1 (W 133) | ½ (B 188) | 0 (W 92) | 0 (B 77) | 1 (W 183) | 0 (B 130) | 0 (W 122) | 0 (B 231) | 1 (W 202) | 1 (B 234) | 1 (W 233) | 0 (B 142) | 1 (B 229) | 0 (W 85) | 1 (B 178) | ½ (W 117) | 0 (B 103) | 9 | 165.5 | 173 | 2463 |
| 160 | (Mongolia) Sugaryn Gan-Erdene | 2444 | 0 (W 75) | 1 (B 248) | ½ (W 134) | ½ (B 63) | ½ (W 107) | ½ (B 135) | 0 (W 230) | ½ (B 162) | 1 (W 164) | 1 (B 112) | 0 (W 143) | 1 (B 171) | 1 (W 199) | ½ (W 209) | 0 (B 184) | 1 (B 223) | 1 (W 205) | 0 (B 140) | 1 (W 197) | 9 | 163 | 168 | 2539 |
| 161 | (Armenia) Robert Piliposyan | 2404 | 0 (W 131) | ½ (B 128) | 0 (B 62) | 1 (W 210) | 0 (W 167) | ½ (B 108) | 1 (W 225) | 0 (B 178) | 1 (W 213) | 0 (B 45) | 0 (W 115) | 0 (B 46) | 0 (W 156) | 1 (B 230) | 0 (W 150) | 0 (W 101) | 1 (B 185) | 0 (B 114) | 1 (W 190) | 9 | 162 | 168.5 | 2491 |
| 162 | (United States) Maxim Dlugy | 2525 | 1 (W 187) | 0 (B 23) | ½ (W 207) | ½ (W 55) | 0 (B 144) | 0 (B 171) | 1 (W 216) | ½ (W 160) | 0 (B 106) | 0 (B 175) | 1 (W 221) | 1 (B 233) | 1 (W 165) | 1 (B 172) | ½ (W 166) | 1 (W 196) | 0 (B 105) | 0 (B 163) | 1 (W 195) | 9 | 159.5 | 166.5 | 2409 |
| 163 | (Azerbaijan) Read Samadov | 2456 | 0 (B 48) | 1 (W 227) | 0 (B 57) | 0 (W 181) | 1 (B 235) | 0 (W 83) | 0 (B 194) | 1 (W 215) | 0 (B 212) | 1 (B 201) | 0 (W 193) | 0 (B 147) | 1 (W 222) | 1 (W 116) | 0 (B 123) | 0 (W 184) | 1 (B 168) | 1 (W 162) | 0 (B 109) | 9 | 157.5 | 163.5 | 2383 |
| 164 | (Norway) Havard Haug | 2561 | 1 (W 251) | 0 (B 3) | 0 (W 231) | ½ (B 195) | 0 (W 189) | 1 (B 222) | 0 (B 146) | 1 (W 175) | 0 (B 160) | 0 (W 229) | 1 (B 219) | 1 (W 242) | 1 (B 173) | ½ (B 198) | 1 (W 177) | 0 (W 190) | ½ (B 208) | ½ (B 153) | 1 (W 199) | 9 | 149.5 | 156 | 2446 |
| 165 | (Hungary) Gleb Dudin | 2470 | 0 (B 22) | 0 (W 215) | 0 (B 181) | 0 (B 194) | 1 (W 250) | 0 (W 228) | 1 (B 249) | 1 (B 237) | 1 (W 223) | 0 (W 34) | 0 (B 207) | 0 (W 204) | 1 (W 202) | 0 (W 175) | 1 (W 210) | 1 (B 201) | 1 (W 191) | 0 (B 156) | 1 (W 192) | 9 | 146 | 150 | 2285 |
| 166 | (Armenia) Emin Ohanyan | 2411 | ½ (B 29) | 1 (W 38) | 0 (B 98) | ½ (W 43) | ½ (B 46) | 1 (W 82) | ½ (B 186) | ½ (W 113) | 0 (B 91) | 0 (W 107) | 1 (B 180) | 1 (W 214) | 0 (B 161) | 0 (W 132) | ½ (B 162) | 0 (W 116) | 1 (B 155) | 0 (W 96) | ½ (B 185) | 8.5 | 181.5 | 190 | 2551 |
| 167 | (India) Krishnan Sasikiran | 2525 | ½ (B 220) | 1 (W 232) | 0 (B 84) | 0 (W 240) | 1 (B 161) | 0 (W 64) | 1 (B 218) | 1 (W 106) | ½ (B 37) | 1 (W 99) | 0 (B 44) | 0 (W 145) | 1 (B 86) | 1 (W 207) | 1 (B 127) | 0 (W 30) | 0 (B 113) | 0 (B 135) | 0 (W 137) | 8.5 | 175.5 | 182 | 2471 |
| 168 | (Mexico) Sion Radamantys Galaviz | 2405 | 1 (B 88) | 1 (W 186) | 0 (B 14) | 0 (W 57) | 0 (B 86) | 1 (W 117) | 1 (B 178) | 0 (W 102) | 0 (B 151) | 0 (W 114) | 1 (B 118) | ½ (W 58) | 0 (B 141) | 0 (W 101) | 0 (B 154) | 1 (B 227) | 0 (W 163) | ½ (B 210) | 1 (W 205) | 8.5 | 172 | 179 | 2521 |
| 169 | (Slovakia) Samir Sahidi | 2486 | ½ (W 20) | 1 (B 6) | ½ (W 156) | 0 (W 9) | 0 (B 56) | 0 (B 191) | 1 (W 200) | 1 (B 223) | 1 (W 230) | ½ (B 76) | 0 (W 134) | 1 (W 185) | 0 (B 104) | 1 (B 194) | 0 (W 88) | 0 (B 204) | 1 (W 179) | 0 (B 173) | 1 (W 210) | 8.5 | 170 | 177 | 2472 |
| 170 | (Azerbaijan) Murad Ibrahimli | 2361 | ½ (B 43) | 1 (W 118) | 0 (B 5) | ½ (W 113) | 0 (B 145) | 1 (W 116) | 0 (B 103) | 1 (W 114) | 0 (B 152) | 0 (B 135) | 1 (W 138) | 0 (B 135) | 0 (W 147) | ½ (W 197) | 0 (B 174) | ½ (W 200) | 1 (B 223) | ½ (B 205) | 1 (W 213) | 8.5 | 169.5 | 176.5 | 2530 |
| 171 | (Norway) Frode Urkedal | 2419 | 0 (B 73) | ½ (W 81) | 0 (B 240) | 1 (W 172) | ½ (B 88) | 1 (W 162) | 1 (B 151) | 0 (W 186) | ½ (B 46) | 0 (W 65) | 0 (B 82) | 0 (W 154) | 0 (B 126) | 0 (W 118) | 1 (B 179) | 0 (W 174) | 0 (B 197) | 1 (W 232) | 1 (B 209) | 8.5 | 169.5 | 176 | 2560 |
| 172 | (India) Harshavardhan G. B. | 2289 | 0 (B 102) | ½ (W 197) | 0 (B 43) | 0 (B 171) | ½ (W 149) | 1 (W 220) | ½ (B 117) | 1 (W 82) | 1 (B 184) | 1 (W 116) | 0 (B 107) | 0 (W 159) | 1 (B 131) | 0 (W 162) | 1 (B 136) | 1 (W 229) | 1 (B 152) | 0 (W 151) | 0 (B 133) | 8.5 | 169 | 176 | 2507 |
| 173 | (Kazakhstan) Sauat Nurgaliyev | 2329 | 0 (W 93) | 0 (B 134) | 1 (W 244) | 1 (B 130) | 1 (W 45) | ½ (W 132) | 1 (B 107) | 0 (B 41) | 0 (W 60) | 0 (B 90) | ½ (W 155) | 0 (W 125) | 0 (B 96) | 1 (B 208) | 0 (B 196) | ½ (W 230) | 1 (B 211) | 1 (W 169) | 0 (W 126) | 8.5 | 168.5 | 174.5 | 2512 |
| 174 | (Germany) Alexander Donchenko | 2584 | 1 (B 144) | 0 (W 37) | ½ (B 196) | 0 (W 126) | 0 (B 122) | 0 (W 146) | 1 (W 238) | 1 (B 195) | 1 (W 229) | 1 (B 97) | 0 (W 54) | 0 (B 101) | 0 (W 163) | 0 (B 110) | 1 (W 170) | 1 (B 171) | 1 (W 183) | 0 (B 87) | 0 (W 136) | 8.5 | 167.5 | 174 | 2445 |
| 175 | (Armenia) Artur Davtyan | 2393 | 1 (W 41) | 0 (B 93) | 1 (W 68) | 0 (B 60) | 0 (W 180) | 0 (B 101) | ½ (W 134) | 0 (B 164) | 1 (B 209) | 1 (W 162) | 0 (W 109) | 0 (B 51) | 0 (W 231) | 1 (B 165) | 0 (W 151) | 0 (B 183) | 1 (W 231) | 0 (B 152) | 1 (W 206) | 8.5 | 167 | 174.5 | 2529 |
| 176 | (France) Augustin Droin | 2464 | 0 (W 40) | 0 (B 226) | 1 (W 223) | 1 (B 233) | 0 (W 156) | 0 (B 80) | 1 (W 237) | 0 (W 197) | 1 (B 207) | 1 (B 128) | 1 (W 108) | 1 (B 213) | 0 (W 133) | ½ (W 88) | 1 (B 86) | 1 (B 157) | 0 (W 94) | 0 (B 112) | 0 (W 129) | 8.5 | 167 | 173.5 | 2485 |
| 177 | (United States) Praveen Balakrishnan | 2445 | 0 (W 59) | 1 (B 244) | ½ (W 63) | ½ (B 134) | 0 (W 112) | ½ (B 205) | ½ (B 197) | 0 (W 46) | 1 (B 220) | 1 (W 111) | 0 (B 66) | 0 (B 93) | 0 (W 68) | 1 (W 217) | 0 (B 164) | 1 (W 242) | 0 (B 194) | 1 (W 181) | ½ (B 187) | 8.5 | 164.5 | 170.5 | 2427 |
| 178 | (Italy) Lorenzo Lodici | 2511 | 1 (W 248) | 0 (B 53) | 0 (W 4) | 0 (B 208) | 1 (W 216) | 1 (B 202) | 0 (W 168) | 1 (W 161) | 0 (B 105) | 1 (B 87) | 0 (W 191) | 0 (W 104) | 0 (B 88) | 0 (B 147) | 1 (W 204) | 0 (B 75) | 0 (W 159) | 0 (B 139) | 1 (W 203) | 8.5 | 163.5 | 168.5 | 2444 |
| 179 | (Japan) Trần Thanh Tú | 2399 | ½ (W 156) | 0 (B 129) | 0 (W 128) | ½ (B 135) | 1 (W 226) | 1 (B 114) | 1 (W 157) | 1 (B 230) | 0 (W 8) | ½ (B 143) | 0 (W 60) | ½ (B 199) | 1 (W 137) | 0 (B 140) | 0 (W 171) | 1 (B 234) | 0 (B 169) | 1 (W 220) | 1 (B 208) | 8.5 | 163 | 169.5 | 2490 |
| 180 | (United States) Varuzhan Akobian | 2531 | 1 (W 223) | 0 (B 21) | 1 (W 182) | 0 (W 52) | 1 (B 175) | 0 (B 78) | 0 (W 142) | ½ (B 231) | 0 (W 147) | 1 (B 202) | 0 (W 166) | 0 (B 68) | 0 (W 229) | 1 (B 199) | 0 (W 110) | 0 (B 153) | 1 (W 203) | 0 (W 158) | 1 (B 207) | 8.5 | 162.5 | 169.5 | 2446 |
| 181 | (Kazakhstan) Danis Kuandykuly | 2177 | 0 (W 108) | 0 (B 92) | 1 (W 165) | 1 (B 163) | 0 (W 124) | 0 (B 133) | 0 (W 231) | 1 (B 182) | 0 (W 87) | 1 (B 208) | 1 (W 198) | 0 (B 137) | 1 (W 139) | 0 (B 138) | 0 (W 112) | ½ (B 203) | 1 (W 206) | 0 (B 177) | 1 (B 211) | 8.5 | 161 | 168.5 | 2473 |
| 182 | (Kazakhstan) Ergali Suleimen | 2373 | 1 (B 18) | 0 (W 102) | 0 (B 180) | 0 (W 116) | 1 (B 245) | 0 (W 103) | 0 (B 88) | 0 (W 181) | 1 (B 249) | 1 (W 228) | ½ (B 213) | 1 (B 155) | 0 (W 109) | 1 (B 227) | 1 (W 155) | 1 (W 96) | 0 (B 104) | ½ (W 197) | 0 (W 130) | 8.5 | 160 | 164.5 | 2433 |
| 183 | (Greece) Stelios Halkias | 2485 | 0 (B 52) | 1 (W 242) | 0 (B 44) | 1 (W 193) | ½ (B 18) | 0 (W 131) | 0 (B 159) | 0 (B 135) | 1 (W 241) | 0 (W 82) | 1 (B 218) | ½ (W 184) | 0 (B 185) | 1 (W 212) | 0 (B 186) | 1 (W 175) | 0 (B 174) | 1 (W 207) | 0 (B 139) | 8.5 | 159.5 | 165.5 | 2447 |
| 184 | (Montenegro) Denis Kadrić | 2535 | ½ (W 241) | 1 (B 221) | 0 (W 33) | 0 (B 6) | 1 (W 146) | 0 (W 240) | 1 (B 210) | 0 (B 137) | 0 (W 172) | 0 (B 195) | 1 (W 234) | 1 (W 210) | 0 (B 204) | 1 (B 236) | 1 (W 160) | 1 (B 163) | 0 (W 127) | ½ (B 133) | 0 (W 119) | 8.5 | 159 | 165 | 2430 |
| 185 | (Turkey) Emre Can | 2502 | 0 (W 4) | ½ (B 194) | 1 (W 241) | 0 (B 128) | 0 (W 204) | ½ (B 200) | 1 (W 234) | 0 (B 149) | 1 (W 208) | 1 (B 198) | 0 (W 39) | ½ (B 182) | 0 (W 203) | 0 (B 87) | ½ (W 153) | ½ (B 192) | 0 (W 161) | 1 (B 193) | ½ (W 166) | 8.5 | 159 | 165 | 2408 |
| 186 | (Netherlands) Robby Kevlishvili | 2572 | 1 (W 207) | 0 (B 168) | 1 (W 190) | 0 (B 203) | 1 (W 231) | ½ (B 97) | ½ (W 166) | 1 (B 171) | 0 (W 120) | 1 (B 142) | 0 (W 119) | 0 (B 168) | 1 (W 182) | 0 (B 189) | 1 (W 183) | 0 (B 124) | 0 (W 126) | 0 (B 146) | 1 (W 204) | 8.5 | 157 | 164.5 | 2434 |
| 187 | (Thailand) Jonathan Bodemar | 2046 | 0 (B 162) | 0 (W 127) | 0 (B 136) | 1 (W 247) | 0 (B 153) | 0 (W 193) | 1 (B 252) | ½ (W 217) | 0 (B 219) | 0 (B 140) | 0 (W 222) | 0 (W 188) | ½ (B 77) | 1 (W 244) | ½ (B 232) | 1 (W 224) | 1 (B 242) | (230w+)}} | ½ (W 177) | 8.5 | 132.5 | 135.5 | 2214 |
| 188 | (FIDE) Sergey Drygalov | 2478 | 1 (B 81) | 1 (W 64) | 0 (B 32) | ½ (W 159) | 1 (B 197) | ½ (W 31) | 0 (B 98) | ½ (W 44) | 0 (B 9) | ½ (W 84) | 1 (W 230) | 1 (W 250) | 0 (B 221) | 0 (B 68) | 1 (W 205) | 0 (B 93) | 0 (W 69) | 0 (B 147) | 0 (W 153) | 8 | 184 | 191 | 2585 |
| 189 | (China) Xiao Tong | 2414 | ½ (W 8) | 0 (B 121) | 0 (B 81) | 1 (W 221) | 1 (B 164) | 0 (W 18) | 1 (B 209) | 1 (W 107) | ½ (B 44) | 0 (W 67) | 1 (B 197) | 1 (B 186) | 0 (W 67) | 1 (W 186) | ½ (B 132) | 0 (W 123) | 0 (B 116) | 0 (W 111) | 0 (B 155) | 8 | 180.5 | 187.5 | 2572 |
| 190 | (United States) Nico Chasin | 2464 | 1 (B 62) | 0 (W 73) | 0 (B 186) | 1 (W 212) | 0 (B 43) | 1 (W 215) | 0 (B 44) | 1 (W 88) | 0 (B 67) | 0 (W 66) | 1 (B 224) | ½ (W 79) | 0 (B 65) | 1 (W 117) | 0 (W 93) | 1 (B 164) | 0 (W 115) | 0 (B 157) | 0 (B 161) | 8 | 176 | 183 | 2538 |
| 191 | (Egypt) Hamed Wafa | 2320 | 0 (B 36) | 0 (W 159) | 1 (B 247) | 1 (W 103) | 0 (B 104) | 1 (W 169) | 1 (B 111) | 1 (W 145) | 0 (B 57) | 0 (W 151) | 1 (B 178) | 1 (W 197) | 0 (B 84) | 0 (W 43) | 0 (B 109) | 0 (W 154) | 0 (B 165) | 0 (W 155) | 1 (B 227) | 8 | 173.5 | 178.5 | 2499 |
| 192 | (Turkey) Cem Kaan Gökerkan | 2394 | 0 (W 205) | 0 (B 80) | 1 (W 225) | 1 (B 68) | 1 (W 230) | 0 (B 112) | 1 (W 152) | 1 (B 143) | 0 (B 38) | ½ (W 102) | 0 (B 132) | 0 (W 66) | 1 (B 117) | 0 (W 46) | 0 (B 130) | ½ (W 185) | 0 (B 96) | 1 (W 200) | 0 (B 165) | 8 | 172.5 | 179.5 | 2519 |
| 193 | (Kazakhstan) Alisher Suleymenov | 2317 | 0 (W 112) | 0 (B 150) | 1 (W 248) | 0 (B 183) | 0 (W 68) | 1 (B 187) | 1 (W 155) | ½ (B 128) | ½ (W 45) | 0 (B 101) | 1 (B 163) | 1 (W 116) | 0 (B 79) | 1 (W 154) | 0 (B 114) | 0 (W 103) | 0 (B 196) | 0 (W 185) | 1 (B 218) | 8 | 168 | 173 | 2466 |
| 194 | (Uzbekistan) Islombek Sindarov | 2115 | 0 (B 151) | ½ (W 185) | 0 (B 122) | 1 (W 165) | 0 (B 19) | ½ (B 100) | 1 (W 163) | 0 (W 85) | 0 (B 206) | 0 (W 139) | 1 (B 158) | 1 (W 131) | 0 (B 111) | 0 (W 169) | ½ (W 211) | 1 (B 198) | 1 (W 177) | 0 (B 154) | 0 (B 148) | 8 | 164 | 171 | 2464 |
| 195 | (Madagascar) Fy Antenaina Rakotomaharo | 2433 | 0 (B 56) | 0 (W 61) | 1 (B 228) | ½ (W 164) | 0 (B 64) | 0 (W 38) | 1 (B 221) | 0 (W 174) | 1 (B 232) | 1 (W 184) | 1 (W 112) | ½ (W 136) | 1 (B 219) | 0 (B 213) | 1 (W 234) | ½ (B 140) | 0 (W 111) | 1 (B 222) | 0 (B 162) | 8 | 163.5 | 170 | 2489 |
| 196 | (India) Harshit Raja | 2455 | 0 (W 50) | 1 (B 238) | ½ (W 174) | ½ (B 129) | 1 (W 205) | 0 (B 95) | 0 (W 80) | 0 (W 65) | 1 (B 235) | 0 (B 39) | 1 (W 214) | 0 (B 124) | 0 (W 130) | 0 (B 150) | 1 (W 173) | 0 (B 162) | 1 (W 193) | 0 (B 138) | 0 (W 149) | 8 | 162.5 | 169 | 2474 |
| 197 | (Norway) Johan-Sebastian Christiansen | 2588 | 0 (W 89) | ½ (B 172) | 1 (W 222) | 1 (B 142) | 0 (W 188) | 0 (B 110) | ½ (W 177) | 1 (B 176) | 1 (W 126) | 0 (B 100) | 0 (W 189) | 0 (B 230) | 1 (W 200) | ½ (B 170) | 1 (W 216) | 0 (B 133) | 1 (W 171) | ½ (B 182) | 0 (B 160) | 8 | 160 | 167 | 2426 |
| 198 | (Bangladesh) Niaz Murshed | 2442 | 0 (B 84) | 1 (W 250) | 0 (B 66) | 0 (W 18) | 1 (B 228) | 0 (W 113) | 1 (B 215) | 0 (W 152) | 1 (B 88) | 0 (W 185) | 0 (B 181) | 0 (B 190) | 0 (W 87) | ½ (W 164) | 0 (B 117) | 0 (W 194) | 0 (B 207) | 1 (W 223) | 1 (W 222) | 8 | 160 | 164 | 2386 |
| 199 | (India) Harikrishnan A Ra | 2417 | 0 (W 34) | 0 (B 74) | 0 (W 233) | 1 (B 246) | 1 (W 237) | 1 (B 115) | 0 (W 143) | ½ (B 157) | ½ (W 68) | 0 (B 230) | 1 (B 88) | 1 (W 232) | ½ (B 118) | 0 (W 180) | 1 (B 212) | ½ (W 209) | 0 (W 140) | 1 (B 201) | 0 (B 164) | 8 | 159.5 | 164.5 | 2477 |
| 200 | (Syria) Fandi Mazen | 2180 | 0 (B 66) | 1 (W 116) | 0 (B 104) | ½ (W 110) | 0 (B 67) | ½ (W 185) | 0 (B 169) | 0 (B 155) | 0 (W 225) | 1 (W 249) | 1 (B 226) | ½ (W 178) | 0 (B 159) | 0 (B 153) | ½ (W 139) | ½ (B 170) | 1 (W 233) | 0 (B 192) | 1 (W 224) | 8 | 156 | 160.5 | 2382 |
| 201 | (Kazakhstan) Miras Assylov | 2250 | 0 (W 24) | 0 (B 96) | 0 (B 18) | 1 (W 249) | 0 (B 103) | 1 (W 243) | 0 (B 116) | 1 (W 238) | 0 (B 114) | 0 (W 163) | 1 (B 237) | 1 (W 211) | 0 (B 196) | 0 (W 206) | 1 (B 220) | 0 (W 165) | 1 (B 218) | 0 (W 199) | 1 (B 219) | 8 | 155.5 | 160 | 2361 |
| 202 | (FIDE) Mihail Nikitenko | 2396 | 0 (B 9) | 0 (W 31) | 1 (B 249) | 0 (W 109) | 1 (B 227) | 0 (W 178) | 1 (B 228) | ½ (W 116) | 0 (B 117) | 0 (W 180) | 0 (B 159) | 0 (W 118) | 1 (B 211) | ½ (W 215) | 0 (B 242) | 0 (W 218) | 1 (B 245) | 1 (W 225) | 1 (W 221) | 8 | 149.5 | 154 | 2324 |
| 203 | (India) Raja Rithvik R | 2406 | 1 (B 135) | ½ (W 209) | ½ (B 9) | 1 (W 186) | 0 (B 27) | ½ (W 102) | 1 (B 132) | 0 (W 81) | 0 (B 86) | ½ (W 117) | 0 (B 152) | 1 (W 241) | 0 (B 164) | 0 (W 114) | 0 (B 116) | ½ (W 181) | 0 (B 180) | 1 (W 237) | 0 (B 178) | 7.5 | 174 | 180.5 | 2543 |
| 204 | (Mongolia) Sumiya Bilguun | 2399 | 0 (B 98) | ½ (W 62) | 0 (B 38) | 1 (W 241) | 1 (B 185) | 0 (W 79) | 0 (B 109) | 1 (W 209) | ½ (B 66) | ½ (W 154) | 0 (B 46) | 0 (W 111) | 1 (B 184) | 0 (W 152) | 0 (B 178) | 1 (W 169) | 0 (W 117) | 0 (B 130) | 0 (B 186) | 7.5 | 172.5 | 178.5 | 2538 |
| 205 | (Spain) José Carlos Ibarra Jeréz | 2590 | 1 (B 192) | 1 (W 206) | 0 (B 15) | 0 (W 229) | 0 (B 196) | ½ (W 177) | 1 (B 219) | ½ (W 19) | 1 (B 154) | 0 (W 77) | 1 (B 96) | 1 (B 164) | 1 (W 183) | 0 (W 72) | 0 (B 188) | 0 (W 99) | 0 (B 160) | ½ (W 170) | 0 (B 168) | 7.5 | 168.5 | 175.5 | 2479 |
| 206 | (Greece) Christos Krallis | 2453 | 1 (W 12) | 0 (B 205) | 0 (W 95) | 1 (B 226) | 0 (W 129) | 1 (B 134) | 0 (W 60) | 0 (B 123) | 1 (W 194) | 0 (B 156) | 1 (W 233) | ½ (W 85) | ½ (B 125) | 1 (B 201) | ½ (B 209) | 0 (W 131) | 0 (B 181) | 1 (W 236) | 0 (B 175) | 7.5 | 162 | 168.5 | 2455 |
| 207 | (Italy) Nicola Altini | 2356 | 0 (B 186) | 1 (W 135) | ½ (B 162) | ½ (W 118) | 0 (B 152) | 0 (W 85) | ½ (W 115) | ½ (B 213) | 0 (W 176) | 1 (B 223) | 1 (W 165) | 0 (B 108) | 0 (W 138) | 0 (B 167) | 0 (W 157) | 0 (B 126) | 1 (W 198) | 0 (B 183) | 0 (W 180) | 7.5 | 161.5 | 168.5 | 2516 |
| 208 | (Brazil) Lucas Cunha Aguiar | 2431 | 0 (B 64) | 0 (W 55) | 1 (B 227) | 1 (W 178) | 0 (B 151) | 1 (W 118) | 0 (B 113) | 0 (W 111) | 0 (B 185) | 0 (W 181) | ½ (B 232) | 1 (B 150) | ½ (W 151) | 0 (W 173) | 1 (W 214) | 1 (B 233) | ½ (W 164) | 0 (B 137) | 0 (W 179) | 7.5 | 157.5 | 164 | 2404 |
| 209 | (Montenegro) Nikita Petrov | 2584 | 1 (W 137) | ½ (B 203) | 1 (W 146) | 0 (B 21) | 0 (W 6) | 0 (B 142) | 0 (W 189) | 0 (B 204) | 0 (W 175) | 1 (B 226) | 1 (W 251) | 1 (W 221) | ½ (B 210) | ½ (B 160) | ½ (W 206) | ½ (B 199) | ½ (W 147) | 0 (B 136) | 0 (W 171) | 7.5 | 157 | 163.5 | 2420 |
| 210 | (United Arab Emirates) Omran Al Hosani | 2229 | 0 (B 82) | ½ (W 113) | 0 (B 118) | 0 (B 161) | 1 (W 242) | 1 (B 213) | 0 (W 184) | 1 (B 140) | 1 (W 157) | 0 (W 130) | 0 (B 229) | 0 (B 231) | 1 (W 223) | 0 (W 148) | 0 (B 165) | 1 (W 226) | 1 (B 225) | ½ (W 168) | 0 (B 169) | 7.5 | 156 | 162 | 2446 |
| 211 | (India) Aditya Mittal | 2431 | 0 (W 53) | 0 (B 16) | 1 (W 237) | 0 (B 59) | 1 (W 223) | 0 (B 230) | 1 (W 233) | ½ (B 45) | 0 (W 134) | ½ (B 138) | 0 (W 128) | 0 (B 183) | ½ (W 208) | 1 (W 239) | ½ (B 194) | 1 (B 236) | 0 (W 173) | 1 (B 238) | 0 (W 181) | 7.5 | 155.5 | 162 | 2352 |
| 212 | (Montenegro) Armin Musović | 2274 | 0 (W 107) | 1 (B 114) | 0 (W 143) | 0 (B 190) | 0 (W 130) | 1 (B 226) | 0 (W 100) | 1 (B 225) | 1 (W 163) | ½ (B 155) | 0 (W 133) | 0 (B 200) | 0 (W 201) | 0 (B 183) | 0 (W 199) | 0 (B 137) | 0 (W 237) | 1 (B 233) | 1 (B 236) | 7.5 | 155 | 161.5 | 2400 |
| 213 | (China) Zhang Zhong | 2535 | ½ (B 232) | 1 (W 218) | 0 (B 17) | 0 (W 27) | 0 (B 110) | 0 (W 210) | 1 (B 251) | ½ (W 207) | 0 (B 161) | 1 (B 236) | ½ (W 182) | 1 (B 157) | 0 (W 150) | 1 (W 195) | 0 (B 146) | 0 (W 105) | 0 (B 158) | 1 (W 217) | 0 (B 170) | 7.5 | 154 | 160.5 | 2388 |
| 214 | (Lithuania) Zanas Nainys | 2228 | 0 (B 79) | 0 (W 111) | 0 (B 116) | 1 (B 239) | 0 (W 87) | 1 (W 245) | 0 (B 114) | 0 (B 108) | 1 (W 227) | 1 (W 158) | 0 (B 196) | 0 (W 175) | 1 (B 235) | 1 (W 225) | 0 (B 208) | ½ (W 217) | 0 (B 220) | 1 (B 249) | 1 (W 238) | 7.5 | 150 | 154.5 | 2305 |
| 215 | (Saudi Arabia) Abdullah Ahmed Alrehaili | 2109 | 0 (W 69) | 1 (B 165) | 0 (W 45) | 1 (B 87) | 0 (W 150) | 0 (B 190) | 0 (W 198) | 0 (B 163) | 0 (W 226) | 1 (B 238) | ½ (W 216) | 0 (B 165) | 0 (W 153) | ½ (B 202) | ½ (W 236) | 0 (B 139) | 0 (W 221) | 1 (B 250) | 1 (B 235) | 7.5 | 147.5 | 151.5 | 2342 |
| 216 | (Germany) Florian Grafl | 2345 | 0 (B 57) | 0 (W 88) | 1 (B 250) | 0 (W 42) | 0 (B 178) | 1 (W 227) | 0 (B 162) | 1 (W 228) | 0 (B 118) | 0 (W 220) | ½ (B 215) | 0 (B 222) | 1 (W 251) | 1 (W 241) | 0 (B 197) | 0 (W 219) | 0 (B 232) | 1 (W 239) | 1 (B 237) | 7.5 | 143.5 | 147.5 | 2273 |
| 217 | (Egypt) Mohamed Ezat | 2352 | 0 (W 63) | 0 (B 95) | 1 (W 238) | 0 (B 114) | 0 (W 135) | 0 (B 237) | 1 (W 243) | ½ (B 187) | ½ (W 115) | 0 (B 233) | 0 (W 223) | 0 (W 218) | 1 (B 226) | 0 (B 177) | 0 (W 227) | ½ (B 214) | 1 (W 234) | 0 (B 213) | 1 (W 232) | 7.5 | 142.5 | 148.5 | 2271 |
| 218 | (Syria) Talab Rami | 2054 | ½ (W 86) | 0 (B 213) | 1 (W 100) | 0 (B 83) | 1 (W 140) | 0 (B 107) | 0 (W 167) | 1 (B 115) | 0 (W 108) | 0 (B 109) | 0 (W 183) | 1 (B 225) | 1 (W 242) | ½ (B 139) | 0 (W 222) | 1 (B 202) | 0 (W 201) | 1 (B 241) | 0 (W 193) | 7 | 162 | 168 | 2463 |
| 219 | (India) Sandipan Chanda | 2441 | 0 (W 76) | 1 (B 252) | 1 (W 112) | 0 (B 41) | 0 (W 63) | ½ (B 68) | 0 (W 205) | 0 (B 134) | 1 (W 187) | 0 (B 157) | 0 (W 164) | 1 (B 216) | 0 (W 157) | 0 (B 234) | 1 (W 238) | 1 (B 216) | 0 (W 139) | ½ (B 221) | 0 (W 201) | 7 | 157 | 160 | 2384 |
| 220 | (Palestine) Mohammed Damaj | 2034 | ½ (W 167) | 0 (B 86) | ½ (W 135) | 0 (B 148) | 0 (W 137) | 0 (B 172) | 1 (W 247) | 1 (B 236) | 0 (W 177) | 1 (B 216) | 0 (W 87) | 1 (B 251) | 0 (W 194) | ½ (B 222) | 0 (W 201) | ½ (B 237) | 1 (W 214) | 0 (B 179) | ½ (W 233) | 7 | 151.5 | 156.5 | 2362 |
| 221 | (India) Sharan Rao | 2255 | ½ (B 118) | 0 (W 184) | 0 (B 113) | 0 (B 189) | 0 (W 222) | 1 (B 239) | 0 (W 195) | 1 (B 251) | 1 (W 140) | 0 (W 88) | 0 (B 162) | ½ (B 139) | 0 (W 140) | 0 (W 131) | 1 (B 241) | 0 (W 136) | 1 (B 215) | ½ (W 219) | 0 (B 202) | 7 | 151 | 157 | 2404 |
| 222 | (Denmark) Vitus Medhus Bondo | 2301 | 0 (W 60) | ½ (B 140) | 0 (B 197) | 0 (W 77) | 1 (B 221) | 0 (W 164) | 0 (B 241) | 1 (W 248) | 0 (B 82) | 0 (W 232) | 1 (B 187) | 0 (B 208) | 1 (W 187) | ½ (W 220) | 1 (B 218) | 0 (B 155) | 1 (W 227) | 0 (W 195) | 0 (B 198) | 7 | 149 | 154 | 2332 |
| 223 | (Egypt) David George Samir | 2104 | 0 (B 180) | 0 (W 42) | 0 (B 176) | 1 (W 250) | 0 (B 211) | 1 (W 247) | 1 (B 136) | 0 (W 169) | 0 (B 165) | 0 (W 207) | 1 (B 217) | 1 (W 215) | 0 (B 162) | 0 (W 158) | 1 (B 224) | 0 (W 160) | 0 (W 170) | 0 (B 198) | 1 (W 245) | 7 | 146 | 150 | 2363 |
| 224 | (Qatar) Husain Aziz | 2342 | 1 (W 134) | 0 (B 60) | 0 (W 115) | 0 (B 101) | 0 (W 80) | 0 (B 233) | 0 (W 226) | 1 (B 243) | 1 (W 237) | 1 (B 225) | 0 (W 190) | 1 (W 153) | 0 (B 209) | 1 (B 245) | 0 (W 223) | 0 (B 187) | 1 (B 246) | 1 (W 228) | 0 (B 200) | 7 | 144 | 149 | 2242 |
| 225 | (Mongolia) Tsogtbileg Anand | 1982 | 0 (B 145) | 0 (W 110) | 0 (B 192) | 0 (W 235) | 1 (B 248) | 1 (W 236) | 0 (B 161) | 0 (W 212) | 1 (B 200) | 0 (W 224) | 0 (B 242) | 0 (B 138) | 0 (W 227) | 0 (B 214) | 1 (B 246) | 1 (W 228) | 0 (W 210) | 0 (B 202) | 1 (W 250) | 7 | 131.5 | 135.5 | 2254 |
| 226 | (South Africa) James Dinham | 1962 | 0 (B 152) | 1 (W 176) | 0 (B 125) | 0 (W 206) | 0 (B 179) | 0 (W 212) | 1 (B 224) | 0 (W 235) | 1 (B 215) | 0 (W 209) | 0 (W 200) | 0 (W 217) | 1 (W 237) | 0 (B 242) | 1 (W 248) | 0 (B 210) | 0 (W 249) | 1 (W 252) | 1 (B 244) | 7 | 130 | 133 | 2244 |
| 227 | (Libya) Yousef Alhassadi | 2078 | 0 (W 143) | 0 (B 163) | 0 (W 208) | 1 (B 252) | 0 (W 202) | 0 (B 216) | 0 (B 248) | 1 (W 244) | 0 (B 214) | 1 (W 247) | 0 (B 235) | 1 (B 237) | 0 (W 216) | 0 (W 182) | 1 (B 217) | 0 (W 168) | 0 (B 222) | 1 (W 242) | 0 (W 191) | 7 | 130 | 133 | 2218 |
| 228 | (Singapore) Ashwath Kaushik | 2101 | 0 (W 115) | 0 (B 133) | 0 (W 195) | 1 (B 244) | 0 (W 198) | 1 (B 165) | 0 (W 202) | 0 (B 216) | 1 (W 247) | 0 (B 182) | 0 (W 236) | 1 (W 239) | 1 (B 224) | ½ (B 243) | 1 (W 245) | 0 (B 225) | 1 (W 250) | 0 (B 224) | 1 (B 246) | 7 | 129 | 133 | 2197 |
| 229 | (India) Karthik Venkataraman | 2472 | 0 (W 70) | 1 (B 246) | 1 (W 80) | 1 (B 205) | 0 (W 53) | 0 (B 41) | ½ (W 156) | 0 (W 132) | 0 (B 174) | 1 (B 164) | 1 (W 210) | ½ (B 238) | 0 (W 234) | 0 (B 129) | 0 (W 159) | 0 (B 172) | 0 (W 137) | (0)}} | (0)}} | 6.5 | 162 | 168.5 | 2496 |
| 230 | (Spain) Maksim Chigaev | 2542 | 1 (B 234) | 0 (W 1) | 1 (B 144) | 0 (W 61) | 0 (B 192) | 1 (W 211) | 1 (B 160) | 0 (W 179) | 0 (B 169) | 1 (W 199) | 0 (B 188) | 0 (W 65) | 1 (B 179) | 0 (W 161) | 0 (B 148) | ½ (B 173) | 0 (W 136) | (187b-)}} | (0)}} | 6.5 | 159.5 | 166 | 2446 |
| 231 | (Australia) James Morris | 2446 | 0 (B 83) | 1 (W 243) | 1 (B 164) | 0 (W 91) | 0 (B 186) | 0 (W 67) | 1 (B 181) | ½ (W 180) | 0 (B 107) | 1 (W 159) | 0 (B 240) | 1 (W 196) | 0 (B 106) | (113w-)}} | 0 (W 156) | 0 (W 86) | 0 (B 175) | (0)}} | (0)}} | 6.5 | 157 | 163.5 | 2508 |
| 232 | (Morocco) Tarik Anwoir | 2116 | ½ (W 213) | 0 (B 167) | 1 (W 140) | 1 (B 108) | 0 (W 74) | 0 (B 36) | 0 (W 138) | 0 (B 68) | 0 (W 195) | 1 (B 222) | ½ (W 208) | 1 (W 209) | 1 (B 174) | 0 (B 233) | ½ (W 187) | 1 (B 248) | 1 (W 216) | 0 (B 171) | 0 (B 217) | 6.5 | 154 | 159 | 2422 |
| 233 | (Syria) Adm Chekh Khedr Aram | 2075 | 0 (B 28) | 0 (W 85) | 1 (B 199) | 0 (W 176) | 0 (B 106) | 1 (W 224) | 0 (B 211) | 0 (W 136) | 1 (B 242) | 1 (W 217) | 0 (B 206) | 0 (B 198) | 0 (W 236) | 1 (W 232) | 1 (B 235) | 0 (W 208) | 0 (B 200) | 0 (W 212) | ½ (B 220) | 6.5 | 149 | 155 | 2364 |
| 234 | (United Arab Emirates) Sedrani Ammar | 2228 | 0 (W 230) | 0 (B 51) | 0 (B 67) | 1 (W 243) | 0 (B 85) | 1 (W 249) | 0 (B 185) | 0 (W 118) | 1 (B 248) | ½ (W 136) | 0 (B 184) | 0 (W 161) | 0 (B 158) | 1 (W 219) | 0 (B 195) | 0 (W 179) | 0 (B 217) | 0 (W 235) | 1 (B 252) | 6.5 | 145 | 148 | 2338 |
| 235 | (Sweden) Victor Muntean | 2259 | 0 (W 68) | 0 (B 101) | 0 (W 94) | 1 (B 225) | 0 (W 163) | 0 (B 238) | 1 (W 245) | 1 (B 226) | 0 (W 196) | 0 (B 115) | 1 (W 227) | 0 (W 158) | 1 (B 228) | 0 (B 112) | 0 (W 233) | 1 (B 250) | 0 (W 236) | 1 (B 234) | 0 (W 215) | 6.5 | 144.5 | 148.5 | 2286 |
| 236 | (Morocco) Mohamed Tissir | 2287 | 0 (W 65) | 0 (B 54) | 1 (W 252) | 0 (B 133) | 0 (W 138) | 0 (B 225) | 1 (B 244) | 0 (W 220) | 1 (B 238) | 0 (W 213) | 1 (B 228) | ½ (B 140) | 0 (W 213) | 0 (W 184) | ½ (B 215) | 0 (W 211) | 1 (B 235) | 0 (B 206) | 0 (W 212) | 6.5 | 144 | 147 | 2287 |
| 237 | (Nepal) Aashish Phuyal | 2087 | 0 (B 46) | 0 (W 103) | 0 (B 211) | 1 (W 248) | 0 (B 199) | 1 (W 217) | 0 (B 176) | 0 (W 165) | 0 (B 224) | 1 (B 245) | 0 (W 201) | 0 (W 88) | 1 (B 232) | 1 (B 252) | 1 (W 243) | ½ (W 220) | 1 (B 212) | 0 (B 203) | 0 (W 216) | 6.5 | 136.5 | 139.5 | 2227 |
| 238 | (Saudi Arabia) Emad Khayat | 1882 | 0 (B 104) | 0 (W 196) | 0 (B 217) | 1 (W 242) | 0 (B 139) | 1 (W 235) | 0 (B 174) | 0 (B 201) | 0 (W 236) | 0 (W 215) | 1 (B 252) | 0 (W 226) | 0 (B 225) | 1 (W 246) | 0 (B 219) | 1 (W 239) | 1 (B 244) | 0 (W 211) | 0 (B 214) | 6.5 | 130.5 | 133.5 | 2249 |
| 239 | (Cayman Islands) Ryan Blackwood | 1951 | 0 (W 124) | 0 (B 148) | 0 (B 139) | 0 (W 214) | 0 (B 247) | 0 (W 221) | 0 (B 242) | 0 (W 250) | 1 (W 252) | 1 (B 246) | 1 (W 245) | ½ (W 228) | 0 (B 241) | 0 (B 211) | ½ (W 249) | 0 (B 238) | 1 (W 243) | 0 (B 216) | 1 (W 241) | 6.5 | 117.5 | 120.5 | 2091 |
| 240 | (Mexico) José Martínez Alcántara | 2696 | ½ (W 100) | 0 (B 99) | 1 (W 171) | 1 (B 167) | 0 (W 54) | 1 (B 184) | 0 (W 124) | 0 (B 125) | 1 (W 138) | 0 (B 105) | 1 (W 231) | 0 (B 227) | 1 (W 248) | (0)}} | (0)}} | (0)}} | (0)}} | (0)}} | (0)}} | 6 | 153.5 | 159.5 | 2468 |
| 241 | (Luxembourg) Fred Berend | 2136 | ½ (B 184) | 0 (W 27) | 0 (B 185) | 0 (B 204) | 1 (W 246) | 0 (B 140) | 1 (W 222) | 0 (W 117) | 0 (B 183) | 0 (B 251) | 1 (W 249) | ½ (W 114) | 0 (B 58) | 0 (B 216) | 0 (W 221) | ½ (W 244) | 1 (B 247) | 0 (W 218) | 0 (B 239) | 6 | 136.5 | 141 | 2278 |
| 242 | (Oman) Mashikhi Al Salim Aliyan | 2186 | 0 (W 123) | 0 (B 183) | 0 (W 114) | 0 (B 238) | 0 (B 210) | 0 (W 244) | 1 (W 239) | 1 (B 245) | 0 (W 233) | 1 (B 248) | 1 (W 225) | 0 (B 202) | 1 (W 238) | 1 (W 226) | 1 (W 202) | 0 (B 177) | 0 (W 187) | 0 (B 227) | 0 (W 243) | 6 | 134.5 | 139.5 | 2160 |
| 243 | (Saudi Arabia) Abdulaziz Alkhuriji | 1972 | 0 (W 157) | 0 (B 231) | 0 (W 137) | 0 (B 234) | 1 (W 252) | 0 (B 201) | 0 (B 217) | 0 (W 224) | ½ (B 244) | 0 (W 250) | 1 (B 247) | 0 (B 163) | 0 (B 217) | ½ (W 228) | 0 (B 237) | 0 (W 246) | 0 (B 239) | 1 (W 248) | 1 (B 242) | 6 | 115.5 | 118.5 | 2081 |
| 244 | (Kuwait) Meshal Alsaqer | 1814 | 0 (B 125) | 0 (W 177) | 0 (B 173) | 0 (W 228) | 0 (B 249) | 1 (B 242) | 0 (W 236) | 0 (B 227) | ½ (W 243) | (252b-)}} | 1 (W 246) | 0 (W 245) | 1 (B 249) | 0 (B 187) | 1 (W 252) | ½ (B 241) | 0 (W 238) | 1 (B 247) | 0 (W 226) | 6 | 113.5 | 116.5 | 2030 |
| 245 | (Qatar) Khaled Aljamaat | 1714 | 1 (W 150) | 0 (B 65) | 0 (W 124) | 0 (B 140) | 0 (W 182) | 0 (B 214) | 0 (B 235) | 0 (W 242) | 1 (B 250) | 0 (W 237) | 0 (B 239) | 0 (B 248) | 1 (W 250) | 0 (W 224) | 0 (B 228) | 1 (B 252) | 0 (W 202) | 0 (W 246) | 0 (B 223) | 5 | 129.5 | 132.5 | 2198 |
| 246 | (Libya) Omer Salah Fates | 2020 | 0 (B 117) | 0 (W 229) | 0 (B 106) | 0 (W 199) | 0 (B 241) | 0 (W 248) | 1 (B 250) | 0 (B 247) | 0 (W 251) | 0 (W 239) | 0 (B 244) | 1 (B 243) | 1 (W 247) | 0 (B 238) | 0 (W 225) | 1 (B 243) | 0 (W 224) | 1 (B 245) | 0 (W 228) | 5 | 117.5 | 120.5 | 2058 |
| 247 | (Qatar) Saif Ahmad | 1602 | 0 (W 138) | 0 (B 97) | 0 (W 191) | 0 (B 187) | 1 (W 239) | 0 (B 223) | 0 (B 220) | 1 (W 246) | 0 (B 228) | 0 (B 227) | 0 (W 243) | 1 (B 249) | 1 (W 252) | ½ (B 248) | ½ (W 250) | 0 (B 249) | 0 (W 241) | 0 (W 244) | (-1)}} | 5 | 117 | 120 | 2012 |
| 248 | (Qatar) Ibrahim Al-Janahi | 1639 | 0 (B 178) | 0 (W 160) | 0 (B 193) | 0 (B 237) | 0 (W 225) | 1 (B 246) | 1 (W 227) | 0 (B 222) | 0 (W 234) | 0 (W 242) | ½ (B 250) | 1 (W 252) | 0 (B 245) | ½ (W 247) | 0 (B 226) | 0 (W 232) | 0 (B 252) | 0 (B 243) | 1 (W 249) | 5 | 116 | 119 | 2078 |
| 249 | (Nepal) Sushrut Dahal | 1990 | 0 (W 45) | 0 (B 87) | 0 (W 202) | 0 (B 201) | 1 (W 244) | 0 (B 234) | 0 (W 165) | 1 (B 252) | 0 (W 182) | 0 (B 200) | 0 (B 241) | 1 (W 244) | 0 (B 239) | 0 (B 250) | ½ (B 239) | 1 (W 247) | 1 (B 226) | 0 (W 214) | 0 (B 248) | 4.5 | 128 | 131 | 2113 |
| 250 | (Qatar) Hamad Al-Kuwari | 1839 | 0 (W 71) | 0 (B 198) | 0 (W 216) | 0 (B 223) | 0 (B 165) | 0 (W 252) | 0 (W 246) | 1 (B 239) | 0 (W 245) | 1 (B 243) | ½ (W 248) | 0 (W 246) | 0 (W 243) | 1 (W 249) | ½ (B 247) | 0 (W 235) | 0 (B 228) | 0 (W 215) | 0 (B 225) | 4 | 121.5 | 124.5 | 2060 |
| 251 | (Kazakhstan) Abilmansur Abdilkhair | 2267 | 0 (B 164) | 1 (W 67) | 0 (B 145) | ½ (W 19) | 0 (B 154) | 0 (B 149) | 0 (W 213) | 0 (W 221) | 1 (B 246) | 1 (W 241) | 0 (B 209) | 0 (B 187) | 0 (B 244) | (0)}} | (0)}} | (0)}} | (0)}} | (0)}} | (0)}} | 3.5 | 124.5 | 128 | 2390 |
| 252 | (Qatar) Fahad Al-Mansouri | 1506 | 0 (B 109) | 0 (W 219) | 0 (B 236) | 0 (W 227) | 0 (B 243) | 1 (B 250) | 0 (W 187) | 0 (W 249) | 0 (B 239) | (244w+)}} | 0 (W 238) | 0 (W 219) | 0 (B 215) | 0 (W 237) | 0 (B 244) | 0 (W 245) | 1 (W 248) | 0 (B 226) | 0 (W 234) | 3 | 112.5 | 115.5 | 2003 |

=== Knockout stage ===
Semifinals
1 | (India) Arjun Erigaisi | 0 | 0 | ½ | – | ½
4 | (Uzbekistan) Nodirbek Abdusattorov | 1 | 1 | ½ | – | 2½
2 | (United States) Fabiano Caruana | ½ | ½ | 0 | 0 | 1
3 | (Norway) Magnus Carlsen | ½ | ½ | 1 | 1 | 3

Finals
(Uzbekistan) Nodirbek Abdusattorov | 1 | 0 | ½ | 0 | 1½
(Norway) Magnus Carlsen | 0 | 1 | ½ | 1 | 2½

== Women's Tournament Results ==
=== Swiss-system tournament ===
The following table lists all participants, with the results from the 15 rounds. The top four players advanced to the knockout stage.

Notation: "1 (W 64)" indicates a win (1 point) with white pieces (W) against player who finished in 64th place (Zsóka Gaál).

| Rank | Name | Rating | 1 | 2 | 3 | 4 | 5 | 6 | 7 | 8 | 9 | 10 | 11 | 12 | 13 | 14 | 15 | Total | BC1 | BS | AROC1 |
|---|---|---|---|---|---|---|---|---|---|---|---|---|---|---|---|---|---|---|---|---|---|
| 1 | (Kazakhstan) Bibisara Assaubayeva | 2428 | 1 (W 64) | ½ (B 14) | ½ (W 54) | 1 (B 99) | 1 (W 87) | 0 (B 38) | ½ (W 20) | 1 (B 26) | 1 (W 37) | 1 (B 11) | 1 (W 7) | 1 (B 8) | 1 (B 3) | 0 (W 5) | ½ (B 6) | 11 | 130.5 | 137 | 2312 |
| 2 | (Ukraine) Anna Muzychuk | 2397 | ½ (W 86) | 1 (B 81) | 1 (W 31) | 0 (B 9) | 1 (W 61) | 1 (B 24) | 0 (W 12) | 1 (B 97) | 1 (W 16) | ½ (B 29) | ½ (W 26) | 1 (B 50) | ½ (W 10) | 1 (W 30) | 1 (B 5) | 11 | 125.5 | 132 | 2247 |
| 3 | (Netherlands) Eline Roebers | 2377 | 1 (W 96) | ½ (B 61) | ½ (W 121) | ½ (B 68) | 1 (W 33) | 1 (B 80) | 1 (W 29) | 1 (B 37) | 1 (W 7) | 1 (B 50) | ½ (W 8) | 1 (B 6) | 0 (W 1) | 0 (B 4) | 1 (W 13) | 11 | 125.5 | 131 | 2288 |
| 4 | (China) Zhu Jiner | 2425 | 1 (W 102) | 1 (B 79) | 0 (W 27) | 1 (B 97) | 1 (W 54) | ½ (B 6) | ½ (W 37) | 0 (B 11) | 1 (W 110) | 0 (B 26) | 1 (W 16) | 1 (B 80) | 1 (W 50) | 1 (W 3) | 1 (B 10) | 11 | 121 | 127 | 2285 |
| 5 | (FIDE) Valentina Gunina | 2314 | 1 (W 117) | 0 (B 111) | ½ (W 96) | 1 (B 86) | ½ (W 16) | 1 (B 64) | 0 (W 17) | 1 (B 83) | 1 (W 31) | 1 (B 53) | 1 (W 38) | 1 (B 13) | 1 (W 12) | 1 (B 1) | 0 (W 2) | 11 | 120.5 | 126.5 | 2288 |
| 6 | (Bulgaria) Antoaneta Stefanova | 2367 | 1 (W 95) | 1 (B 97) | 1 (W 91) | 0 (B 27) | 1 (W 83) | ½ (W 4) | 1 (B 9) | 1 (B 17) | 1 (W 8) | ½ (B 7) | ½ (W 10) | 0 (W 3) | ½ (B 30) | 1 (B 26) | ½ (W 1) | 10.5 | 130 | 136.5 | 2312 |
| 7 | (FIDE) Aleksandra Goryachkina | 2439 | ½ (W 33) | 1 (B 58) | 1 (W 14) | 1 (W 30) | 1 (B 43) | 1 (W 9) | 1 (B 8) | 1 (W 28) | 0 (B 3) | ½ (W 6) | 0 (B 1) | ½ (B 10) | ½ (W 26) | ½ (B 11) | ½ (W 19) | 10 | 136.5 | 144.5 | 2324 |
| 8 | (Uzbekistan) Umida Omonova | 2278 | 1 (W 74) | 1 (B 122) | 1 (W 23) | 1 (B 38) | 1 (W 19) | 1 (B 26) | 0 (W 7) | 1 (W 50) | 0 (B 6) | 1 (W 27) | ½ (B 3) | 0 (W 1) | 1 (B 22) | 0 (B 13) | ½ (W 12) | 10 | 133 | 138.5 | 2347 |
| 9 | (FIDE) Anna Shukhman | 2204 | 1 (B 136) | 1 (W 89) | ½ (B 22) | 1 (W 2) | 1 (W 39) | 0 (B 7) | 0 (W 6) | ½ (B 13) | 1 (W 23) | ½ (B 18) | ½ (W 11) | 1 (B 38) | 1 (W 28) | 0 (B 10) | 1 (W 26) | 10 | 132 | 136 | 2377 |
| 10 | (China) Song Yuxin | 2371 | 0 (B 51) | 1 (W 112) | 1 (B 63) | 0 (W 41) | 1 (B 45) | 1 (W 82) | ½ (B 21) | 1 (W 52) | 1 (B 62) | 1 (W 30) | ½ (B 6) | ½ (W 7) | ½ (B 2) | 1 (W 9) | 0 (W 4) | 10 | 126 | 132 | 2253 |
| 11 | (Bulgaria) Nurgyul Salimova | 2336 | 1 (B 70) | 1 (W 48) | 0 (B 51) | 0 (W 62) | 1 (B 44) | 1 (W 111) | 1 (B 63) | 1 (W 4) | ½ (B 28) | 0 (W 1) | ½ (B 9) | 1 (W 40) | 1 (B 27) | ½ (W 7) | ½ (B 15) | 10 | 126 | 132 | 2251 |
| 12 | (Kazakhstan) Alua Nurman | 2324 | 1 (B 77) | ½ (W 62) | ½ (B 21) | ½ (W 40) | 1 (B 52) | 1 (W 131) | 1 (B 2) | ½ (W 27) | ½ (B 66) | ½ (W 28) | ½ (B 29) | 1 (W 20) | 0 (B 5) | 1 (W 39) | ½ (B 8) | 10 | 125.5 | 130.5 | 2238 |
| 13 | (FIDE) Leya Garifullina | 2407 | ½ (B 63) | 1 (W 98) | ½ (B 34) | 1 (W 21) | 1 (B 111) | 0 (W 50) | ½ (B 88) | ½ (W 9) | 1 (B 82) | 1 (W 66) | 1 (B 27) | 0 (W 5) | 1 (B 29) | 1 (W 8) | 0 (B 3) | 10 | 122 | 128 | 2239 |
| 14 | (Romania) Irina Bulmaga | 2251 | 1 (B 29) | ½ (W 1) | 0 (B 7) | 0 (W 131) | 1 (B 114) | ½ (W 70) | 1 (B 77) | ½ (W 44) | 1 (B 52) | 0 (B 16) | 1 (W 95) | 1 (W 35) | ½ (B 19) | 1 (W 27) | 1 (B 30) | 10 | 120 | 125 | 2218 |
| 15 | (Mongolia) Turmunkh Munkhzul | 2307 | 1 (W 92) | 0 (B 91) | ½ (W 95) | 0 (B 96) | 1 (W 86) | 0 (B 16) | 1 (W 90) | 1 (B 72) | 0 (W 41) | 1 (B 97) | 1 (W 42) | 1 (B 47) | 1 (W 17) | 1 (B 53) | ½ (W 11) | 10 | 111 | 117.5 | 2220 |
| 16 | (FIDE) Veronika Iudina | 2037 | 1 (W 71) | 0 (B 37) | 1 (B 48) | ½ (W 34) | ½ (B 5) | 1 (W 15) | ½ (B 35) | 1 (W 65) | 0 (B 2) | 1 (W 14) | 0 (B 4) | ½ (W 24) | 1 (B 82) | ½ (W 28) | 1 (B 55) | 9.5 | 129.5 | 136.5 | 2300 |
| 17 | (China) Ju Wenjun | 2489 | ½ (W 58) | 1 (B 33) | 1 (W 20) | 0 (B 28) | 1 (B 51) | ½ (W 43) | 1 (B 5) | 0 (W 6) | 0 (W 80) | ½ (B 55) | 1 (B 65) | 1 (W 44) | 0 (B 15) | 1 (W 37) | 1 (B 29) | 9.5 | 125 | 132 | 2260 |
| 18 | (Georgia (country)) Meri Arabidze | 2356 | ½ (B 56) | ½ (W 63) | 1 (B 45) | ½ (W 52) | 1 (B 70) | 1 (W 67) | 0 (B 27) | 1 (W 21) | ½ (B 40) | ½ (W 9) | 1 (B 25) | ½ (W 29) | 0 (B 39) | 1 (W 51) | ½ (B 20) | 9.5 | 121 | 128.5 | 2209 |
| 19 | (FIDE) Kateryna Lagno | 2448 | 1 (B 68) | 1 (W 67) | 1 (B 50) | 1 (W 37) | 0 (B 8) | 0 (W 28) | 1 (B 43) | ½ (W 66) | 0 (B 30) | 1 (W 65) | 1 (W 80) | 0 (B 26) | ½ (W 14) | 1 (B 34) | ½ (B 7) | 9.5 | 121 | 128 | 2291 |
| 20 | (Serbia) Teodora Injac | 2323 | 1 (W 129) | ½ (B 31) | 0 (B 17) | 1 (W 42) | 1 (B 40) | ½ (W 46) | ½ (B 1) | 0 (W 62) | 1 (W 97) | 1 (B 95) | 1 (W 81) | 0 (B 12) | 1 (W 37) | ½ (B 21) | ½ (W 18) | 9.5 | 120 | 125.5 | 2258 |
| 21 | (Austria) Olga Badelka | 2208 | ½ (W 133) | 1 (B 126) | ½ (W 12) | 0 (B 13) | 1 (W 122) | 1 (B 32) | ½ (W 10) | 0 (B 18) | 1 (W 101) | 1 (B 24) | 1 (W 39) | 0 (W 30) | 1 (B 57) | ½ (W 20) | ½ (B 22) | 9.5 | 120 | 125 | 2298 |
| 22 | (India) Divya Deshmukh | 2388 | 1 (W 83) | 1 (B 108) | ½ (W 9) | 1 (B 61) | ½ (W 28) | 0 (B 37) | 1 (W 110) | 0 (B 53) | 1 (W 54) | 0 (B 80) | 1 (W 31) | 1 (B 63) | 0 (W 8) | 1 (B 52) | ½ (W 21) | 9.5 | 115.5 | 121.5 | 2259 |
| 23 | (India) Koneru Humpy | 2430 | 1 (B 41) | 1 (W 87) | 0 (B 8) | 1 (W 65) | 0 (B 37) | 0 (W 66) | 1 (B 45) | 1 (W 111) | 0 (B 9) | 0 (W 82) | ½ (B 52) | 1 (W 98) | 1 (B 67) | 1 (W 43) | 1 (B 38) | 9.5 | 113.5 | 119.5 | 2236 |
| 24 | (Poland) Aleksandra Maltsevskaya | 2323 | 1 (B 112) | 0 (W 51) | ½ (B 103) | 1 (W 98) | 1 (B 69) | 0 (W 2) | 0 (B 52) | 1 (B 48) | 1 (W 96) | 0 (W 21) | 1 (B 62) | ½ (B 16) | ½ (W 64) | 1 (W 40) | 1 (B 39) | 9.5 | 113.5 | 119.5 | 2189 |
| 25 | (Kazakhstan) Meruert Kamalidenova | 2295 | 1 (B 115) | 0 (W 42) | ½ (B 70) | 1 (W 103) | 0 (B 131) | 1 (W 68) | 0 (B 62) | 1 (W 56) | 1 (B 98) | 1 (W 41) | 0 (W 18) | 0 (B 39) | 1 (W 73) | 1 (B 65) | 1 (W 49) | 9.5 | 108 | 113 | 2206 |
| 26 | (United States) Carissa Yip | 2313 | 1 (B 105) | 1 (W 44) | 1 (B 42) | 1 (W 51) | 1 (B 27) | 0 (W 8) | 0 (B 28) | 0 (W 1) | 1 (B 112) | 1 (W 4) | ½ (B 2) | 1 (W 19) | ½ (B 7) | 0 (W 6) | 0 (B 9) | 9 | 132.5 | 138.5 | 2288 |
| 27 | (Kazakhstan) Zarina Nurgaliyeva | 2209 | 1 (B 139) | 1 (W 35) | 1 (B 4) | 1 (W 6) | 0 (W 26) | ½ (B 39) | 1 (W 18) | ½ (B 12) | 1 (W 38) | 0 (B 8) | 0 (W 13) | 1 (B 53) | 0 (W 11) | 0 (B 14) | 1 (W 52) | 9 | 132 | 133 | 2344 |
| 28 | (Ukraine) Mariya Muzychuk | 2373 | ½ (W 81) | 1 (B 86) | 1 (W 90) | 1 (W 17) | ½ (B 22) | 1 (B 19) | 1 (W 26) | 0 (B 7) | ½ (W 11) | ½ (B 12) | 0 (W 50) | 1 (W 51) | 0 (B 9) | ½ (B 16) | ½ (W 32) | 9 | 126 | 133 | 2298 |
| 29 | (FIDE) Diana Khafizova | 2033 | 0 (W 14) | 1 (B 72) | ½ (B 82) | 1 (W 113) | 1 (B 55) | 1 (W 30) | 0 (B 3) | 1 (W 88) | 1 (B 46) | ½ (W 2) | ½ (W 12) | ½ (B 18) | 0 (W 13) | 1 (B 50) | 0 (W 17) | 9 | 126 | 132 | 2335 |
| 30 | (Mongolia) Bat-Erdene Mungunzul | 2329 | 1 (B 40) | 1 (W 82) | ½ (W 69) | 0 (B 7) | 1 (W 68) | 0 (B 29) | 1 (W 95) | 1 (B 81) | 1 (W 19) | 0 (B 10) | 1 (W 37) | 1 (B 21) | ½ (W 6) | 0 (B 2) | 0 (W 14) | 9 | 125.5 | 132 | 2260 |
| 31 | (Hungary) Davaademberel Nomin-Erdene | 2201 | 1 (B 138) | ½ (W 20) | 0 (B 2) | 0 (B 53) | 1 (W 74) | 1 (W 115) | 1 (B 67) | ½ (W 35) | 0 (B 5) | 1 (W 57) | 0 (B 22) | 0 (W 43) | 1 (B 85) | 1 (B 80) | 1 (W 50) | 9 | 117.5 | 119.5 | 2293 |
| 32 | (Switzerland) Alexandra Kosteniuk | 2428 | 1 (B 116) | ½ (W 34) | 1 (B 88) | 0 (W 43) | ½ (B 82) | 0 (W 21) | 0 (B 51) | 1 (W 45) | 1 (B 111) | 1 (W 33) | 0 (B 44) | 1 (W 99) | ½ (B 40) | 1 (W 41) | ½ (B 28) | 9 | 113.5 | 119.5 | 2209 |
| 33 | (Azerbaijan) Gulnar Mammadova | 2185 | ½ (B 7) | 0 (W 17) | 1 (B 123) | 1 (W 47) | 0 (B 3) | ½ (W 85) | 0 (B 112) | 1 (W 69) | 1 (W 75) | 0 (B 32) | 1 (W 78) | 0 (B 71) | 1 (W 110) | 1 (B 60) | 1 (W 53) | 9 | 113 | 118.5 | 2324 |
| 34 | (Georgia (country)) Inga Charkhalashvili | 2248 | 1 (W 132) | ½ (B 32) | ½ (W 13) | ½ (B 16) | ½ (W 96) | 1 (B 83) | 0 (W 53) | 0 (B 95) | 1 (W 104) | ½ (B 42) | ½ (W 61) | 1 (B 58) | 1 (W 81) | 0 (W 19) | 1 (B 56) | 9 | 111.5 | 116.5 | 2227 |
| 35 | (Spain) Sarasadat Khademalsharieh | 2352 | 1 (W 84) | 0 (B 27) | 1 (W 64) | 0 (B 83) | 1 (W 104) | 1 (B 96) | ½ (W 16) | ½ (B 31) | ½ (W 95) | 0 (B 81) | 1 (W 55) | 0 (B 14) | ½ (B 42) | 1 (W 82) | 1 (B 51) | 9 | 110.5 | 117 | 2169 |
| 36 | (Azerbaijan) Gunay Mammadzada | 2326 | 0 (W 100) | 1 (B 125) | 0 (W 83) | 1 (B 94) | 0 (W 81) | 1 (B 121) | 1 (W 102) | ½ (B 41) | 0 (W 73) | 0 (B 61) | ½ (W 96) | 1 (B 84) | 1 (W 66) | 1 (B 64) | 1 (W 58) | 9 | 99.5 | 105 | 2164 |
| 37 | (Ukraine) Nataliya Buksa | 2281 | 1 (B 114) | 1 (W 16) | 1 (B 46) | 0 (B 19) | 1 (W 23) | 1 (W 22) | ½ (B 4) | 0 (W 3) | 0 (B 1) | 1 (W 62) | 0 (B 30) | 1 (W 49) | 0 (B 20) | 0 (B 17) | 1 (W 72) | 8.5 | 131 | 137 | 2349 |
| 38 | (Armenia) Elina Danielian | 2373 | 1 (B 103) | 1 (W 99) | 1 (B 111) | 0 (W 8) | 1 (B 41) | 1 (W 1) | 0 (B 50) | 1 (W 46) | 0 (B 27) | 1 (W 40) | 0 (B 5) | 0 (W 9) | ½ (B 44) | 1 (W 63) | 0 (W 23) | 8.5 | 123 | 129 | 2262 |
| 39 | (FIDE) Polina Shuvalova | 2399 | 1 (B 45) | 1 (W 65) | ½ (B 55) | 1 (W 69) | 0 (B 9) | ½ (W 27) | 0 (B 66) | ½ (W 98) | 1 (B 88) | 1 (W 73) | 0 (B 21) | 1 (W 25) | 1 (W 18) | 0 (B 12) | 0 (W 24) | 8.5 | 120.5 | 127 | 2244 |
| 40 | (Vietnam) Võ Thị Kim Phụng | 2122 | 0 (W 30) | 1 (B 135) | 1 (W 110) | ½ (B 12) | 0 (W 20) | 1 (B 73) | 1 (W 61) | 1 (B 71) | ½ (W 18) | 0 (B 38) | 1 (W 54) | 0 (B 11) | ½ (W 32) | 0 (B 24) | 1 (W 80) | 8.5 | 118.5 | 123 | 2308 |
| 41 | (China) Jiang Tianyu | 2183 | 0 (W 23) | 1 (B 76) | 1 (W 122) | 1 (B 10) | 0 (W 38) | 0 (B 110) | 1 (W 92) | ½ (W 36) | 1 (B 15) | 0 (B 25) | 0 (W 49) | 1 (B 101) | 1 (W 47) | 0 (B 32) | 1 (W 71) | 8.5 | 117 | 122.5 | 2305 |
| 42 | (India) Charvi A. | 2062 | 1 (W 78) | 1 (B 25) | 0 (W 26) | 0 (B 20) | 0 (W 99) | 1 (B 104) | 1 (W 64) | 0 (B 54) | 1 (W 87) | ½ (W 34) | 0 (B 15) | 1 (B 97) | ½ (W 35) | ½ (B 48) | 1 (W 61) | 8.5 | 115 | 121.5 | 2260 |
| 43 | (Luxembourg) Elvira Berend | 2260 | ½ (W 126) | 1 (B 119) | 1 (W 53) | 1 (B 32) | 0 (W 7) | ½ (B 17) | 0 (W 19) | ½ (B 96) | 0 (W 81) | ½ (B 48) | 1 (W 94) | 1 (B 31) | ½ (W 63) | 0 (B 23) | 1 (W 76) | 8.5 | 114.5 | 120 | 2270 |
| 44 | (Uzbekistan) Gulrukhbegim Tokhirjonova | 2133 | 1 (W 113) | 0 (B 26) | 0 (W 80) | 1 (B 101) | 0 (W 11) | 1 (B 122) | 1 (W 75) | ½ (B 14) | ½ (W 71) | 1 (B 110) | 1 (W 32) | 0 (B 17) | ½ (W 38) | 0 (B 49) | 1 (W 73) | 8.5 | 112.5 | 118 | 2332 |
| 45 | (Kazakhstan) Liya Kurmangaliyeva | 2167 | 0 (W 39) | 1 (B 132) | 0 (W 18) | 1 (B 120) | 0 (W 10) | 1 (B 106) | 0 (W 23) | 0 (B 32) | 1 (W 93) | 1 (B 60) | 1 (W 85) | 1 (B 54) | 0 (W 53) | ½ (B 71) | 1 (W 65) | 8.5 | 112 | 117 | 2275 |
| 46 | (China) Tan Zhongyi | 2457 | 1 (W 72) | 1 (B 110) | 0 (W 37) | 1 (W 55) | ½ (B 67) | ½ (B 20) | 1 (W 54) | 0 (B 38) | 0 (W 29) | 0 (B 99) | 1 (W 48) | ½ (B 81) | 0 (W 65) | 1 (B 95) | 1 (W 64) | 8.5 | 110 | 116 | 2235 |
| 47 | (India) Vaishali Rameshbabu | 2401 | 1 (W 104) | ½ (B 54) | 0 (W 61) | 0 (B 33) | 1 (W 76) | 0 (B 72) | 1 (B 68) | 1 (W 67) | 0 (B 65) | 1 (W 98) | 1 (B 73) | 0 (W 15) | 0 (B 41) | 1 (W 100) | 1 (B 63) | 8.5 | 108.5 | 115 | 2208 |
| 48 | (Vietnam) Hong Anh Nguyên | 2203 | 1 (W 135) | 0 (B 11) | 0 (W 16) | ½ (B 74) | 0 (W 90) | 1 (B 126) | 1 (B 125) | 0 (W 24) | 1 (B 131) | ½ (W 43) | 0 (B 46) | 1 (W 107) | 1 (B 59) | ½ (W 42) | 1 (B 69) | 8.5 | 107 | 111.5 | 2149 |
| 49 | (India) Harika Dronavalli | 2389 | 1 (B 52) | 0 (W 55) | ½ (B 62) | 0 (W 82) | 0 (B 103) | 1 (B 120) | 1 (W 100) | 0 (B 73) | 1 (W 84) | 1 (W 124) | 1 (B 41) | 0 (B 37) | 1 (W 68) | 1 (W 44) | 0 (B 25) | 8.5 | 106.5 | 112 | 2174 |
| 50 | (Argentina) Candela Francisco | 2298 | 1 (W 125) | 1 (B 100) | 0 (W 19) | 1 (B 84) | 1 (W 56) | 1 (B 13) | 1 (W 38) | 0 (B 8) | 1 (W 53) | 0 (W 3) | 1 (B 28) | 0 (W 2) | 0 (B 4) | 0 (W 29) | 0 (B 31) | 8 | 127.5 | 133 | 2302 |
| 51 | (FIDE) Aliaksandra Tarasenka | 2142 | 1 (W 10) | 1 (B 24) | 1 (W 11) | 0 (B 26) | 0 (W 17) | 0 (B 54) | 1 (W 32) | 0 (B 110) | 1 (W 78) | 1 (B 71) | 1 (W 99) | 0 (B 28) | 1 (W 80) | 0 (B 18) | 0 (W 35) | 8 | 121 | 127 | 2335 |
| 52 | (Singapore) Gong Qianyun | 2157 | 0 (W 49) | 1 (B 127) | 1 (W 113) | ½ (B 18) | 0 (W 12) | 1 (B 78) | 1 (W 24) | 0 (B 10) | 0 (W 14) | 1 (B 101) | ½ (W 23) | 1 (B 61) | 1 (W 71) | 0 (W 22) | 0 (B 27) | 8 | 120.5 | 126 | 2317 |
| 53 | (China) Lei Tingjie | 2478 | ½ (B 98) | 1 (W 120) | 0 (B 43) | 1 (W 31) | ½ (B 66) | 1 (W 62) | 1 (B 34) | 1 (W 22) | 0 (B 50) | 0 (W 5) | 1 (B 82) | 0 (W 27) | 1 (B 45) | 0 (W 15) | 0 (B 33) | 8 | 120 | 126 | 2238 |
| 54 | (Georgia (country)) Nino Batsiashvili | 2247 | 1 (B 123) | ½ (W 47) | ½ (B 1) | 1 (W 115) | 0 (B 4) | 1 (W 51) | 0 (B 46) | 1 (W 42) | 0 (B 22) | 1 (W 112) | 0 (B 40) | 0 (W 45) | 1 (B 77) | 0 (W 56) | 1 (B 85) | 8 | 116.5 | 122 | 2234 |
| 55 | (Uzbekistan) Afruza Khamdamova | 2227 | 1 (W 109) | 1 (B 49) | ½ (W 39) | 0 (B 46) | 0 (W 29) | ½ (B 84) | 0 (W 96) | 1 (B 106) | 1 (W 83) | ½ (W 17) | 0 (B 35) | ½ (B 95) | 1 (W 93) | 1 (B 81) | 0 (W 16) | 8 | 110 | 116.5 | 2211 |
| 56 | (FIDE) Yana Zhapova | 2139 | ½ (W 18) | ½ (B 80) | 1 (W 101) | 1 (W 89) | 0 (B 50) | ½ (B 97) | 0 (W 71) | 0 (B 25) | ½ (W 60) | 0 (B 85) | 1 (W 106) | 1 (B 113) | 1 (W 87) | 1 (B 54) | 0 (W 34) | 8 | 107 | 113 | 2285 |
| 57 | (Poland) Klaudia Kulon | 2338 | 0 (W 91) | 0 (B 92) | 1 (W 133) | 0 (B 81) | 1 (W 132) | ½ (B 100) | 1 (W 103) | ½ (B 61) | 1 (W 64) | 0 (B 31) | 1 (W 72) | 1 (B 66) | 0 (W 21) | 0 (B 58) | 1 (W 84) | 8 | 102.5 | 107.5 | 2156 |
| 58 | (Vietnam) Hanh Luong Phuong | 2197 | ½ (B 17) | 0 (W 7) | 0 (B 131) | 0 (W 123) | 1 (B 133) | ½ (W 114) | 0 (B 128) | 1 (W 127) | 1 (B 118) | 1 (W 70) | 1 (B 113) | 0 (W 34) | 1 (B 88) | 1 (W 57) | 0 (B 36) | 8 | 99.5 | 104.5 | 2195 |
| 59 | (Mongolia) Khishigbaatar Bayasgalan | 2297 | 1 (W 131) | 0 (B 69) | 0 (W 84) | 1 (B 100) | 0 (W 95) | 0 (B 76) | 1 (W 93) | 1 (B 94) | 1 (W 102) | 0 (B 63) | 0 (W 64) | 1 (B 117) | 0 (W 48) | 1 (B 83) | 1 (W 81) | 8 | 99 | 104 | 2132 |
| 60 | (Armenia) Lilit Mkrtchian | 2293 | ½ (W 121) | 0 (B 90) | 0 (W 86) | 0 (B 122) | 0 (W 119) | 1 (B 139) | 1 (W 126) | 1 (B 125) | ½ (B 56) | 0 (W 45) | 1 (B 124) | 1 (W 94) | 1 (B 99) | 0 (W 33) | 1 (B 82) | 8 | 93.5 | 94.5 | 2086 |
| 61 | (FIDE) Alina Bivol | 2224 | 1 (B 107) | ½ (W 3) | 1 (B 47) | 0 (W 22) | 0 (B 2) | 1 (W 69) | 0 (B 40) | ½ (W 57) | ½ (B 124) | 1 (W 36) | ½ (B 34) | 0 (W 52) | ½ (B 76) | 1 (W 68) | 0 (B 42) | 7.5 | 120 | 125.5 | 2222 |
| 62 | (FIDE) Mariya Yakimova | 2153 | 1 (W 75) | ½ (B 12) | ½ (W 49) | 1 (B 11) | ½ (W 80) | 0 (B 53) | 1 (W 25) | 1 (B 20) | 0 (W 10) | 0 (B 37) | 0 (W 24) | 0 (B 73) | ½ (W 101) | 1 (B 110) | ½ (W 78) | 7.5 | 119.5 | 125.5 | 2331 |
| 63 | (Vietnam) Hong Nhung Nguyên | 2171 | ½ (W 13) | ½ (B 18) | 0 (W 10) | 1 (B 132) | 1 (W 75) | 1 (B 87) | 0 (W 11) | 0 (B 80) | 1 (W 113) | 1 (W 59) | 1 (B 66) | 0 (W 22) | ½ (B 43) | 0 (B 38) | 0 (W 47) | 7.5 | 117.5 | 122.5 | 2333 |
| 64 | (Hungary) Zsóka Gaál | 2182 | 0 (B 1) | 1 (W 128) | 0 (B 35) | 1 (W 93) | 1 (B 89) | 0 (W 5) | 0 (B 42) | 1 (W 114) | 0 (B 57) | 1 (W 105) | 1 (B 59) | 1 (W 88) | ½ (B 24) | 0 (W 36) | 0 (B 46) | 7.5 | 116 | 121.5 | 2261 |
| 65 | (India) Padmini Rout | 2239 | 1 (W 127) | 0 (B 39) | 1 (W 129) | 0 (B 23) | 1 (W 91) | ½ (B 81) | 1 (W 72) | 0 (B 16) | 1 (W 47) | 0 (B 19) | 0 (W 17) | 1 (B 96) | 1 (B 46) | 0 (W 25) | 0 (B 45) | 7.5 | 115 | 120.5 | 2274 |
| 66 | (Bulgaria) Nadya Toncheva | 2210 | 0 (W 122) | ½ (B 131) | 1 (W 126) | 1 (B 90) | ½ (W 53) | 1 (B 23) | 1 (W 39) | ½ (B 19) | ½ (W 12) | 0 (B 13) | 0 (W 63) | 0 (W 57) | 0 (B 36) | ½ (W 75) | 1 (B 100) | 7.5 | 112 | 117 | 2285 |
| 67 | (FIDE) Anastasia Bodnaruk | 2259 | 1 (W 76) | 0 (B 19) | 1 (W 94) | 1 (B 91) | ½ (W 46) | 0 (B 18) | 0 (W 31) | 0 (B 47) | 0 (W 92) | 1 (B 121) | 1 (W 90) | 1 (B 102) | 0 (W 23) | 0 (B 72) | 1 (W 95) | 7.5 | 110.5 | 116 | 2233 |
| 68 | (India) Priyanka Nutakki | 2191 | 0 (W 19) | 1 (B 74) | 1 (W 120) | ½ (W 3) | 0 (B 30) | 0 (B 25) | 0 (W 47) | ½ (B 90) | ½ (W 121) | 1 (B 126) | 1 (W 69) | 1 (W 89) | 0 (B 49) | 0 (B 61) | 1 (W 105) | 7.5 | 110.5 | 116 | 2228 |
| 69 | (Azerbaijan) Malak Ismayil | 2085 | 1 (W 101) | 1 (W 59) | ½ (B 30) | 0 (B 39) | 0 (W 24) | 0 (B 61) | ½ (W 78) | 0 (B 33) | ½ (W 79) | 1 (B 91) | 0 (B 68) | 1 (W 124) | 1 (W 102) | 1 (B 113) | 0 (W 48) | 7.5 | 108.5 | 114 | 2259 |
| 70 | (Azerbaijan) Ulviyya Fataliyeva | 2127 | 0 (W 11) | 1 (B 130) | ½ (W 25) | 1 (B 71) | 0 (W 18) | ½ (B 14) | 0 (W 87) | 0 (B 75) | 1 (W 106) | 0 (B 58) | ½ (W 127) | ½ (B 74) | 1 (W 117) | 1 (B 101) | ½ (W 79) | 7.5 | 108.5 | 114 | 2217 |
| 71 | (United States) Jennifer Yu | 2260 | 0 (B 16) | ½ (W 114) | 1 (B 118) | 0 (W 70) | 1 (B 129) | 1 (W 103) | 1 (B 56) | 0 (W 40) | ½ (B 44) | 0 (W 51) | 1 (B 112) | 1 (W 33) | 0 (B 52) | ½ (W 45) | 0 (B 41) | 7.5 | 108.5 | 114 | 2131 |
| 72 | (Armenia) Mariam Mkrtchyan | 2193 | 0 (B 46) | 0 (W 29) | 1 (B 107) | ½ (W 114) | 1 (B 123) | 1 (W 47) | 0 (B 65) | 0 (W 15) | ½ (B 89) | 1 (W 77) | 0 (B 57) | ½ (B 75) | 1 (W 127) | 1 (W 67) | 0 (B 37) | 7.5 | 107.5 | 113 | 2227 |
| 73 | (Poland) Oliwia Kiolbasa | 2229 | 0 (B 120) | 0 (W 93) | 1 (B 124) | 1 (W 125) | ½ (B 115) | 0 (W 40) | 1 (B 74) | 1 (W 49) | 1 (B 36) | 0 (B 39) | 0 (W 47) | 1 (W 62) | 0 (B 25) | 1 (W 98) | 0 (B 44) | 7.5 | 107 | 112.5 | 2189 |
| 74 | (Estonia) Margareth Olde | 2063 | 0 (B 8) | 0 (W 68) | 1 (B 139) | ½ (W 48) | 0 (B 31) | 1 (B 86) | 0 (W 73) | 1 (B 100) | 0 (W 85) | 0 (W 116) | 1 (B 122) | ½ (W 70) | 1 (B 94) | 1 (W 99) | ½ (B 89) | 7.5 | 102.5 | 103.5 | 2176 |
| 75 | (Georgia (country)) Nana Dzagnidze | 2378 | 0 (B 62) | 1 (W 118) | 1 (B 116) | 0 (W 111) | 0 (B 63) | 1 (W 91) | 0 (B 44) | 1 (W 70) | 0 (B 33) | 1 (W 92) | 0 (B 88) | ½ (W 72) | ½ (W 95) | ½ (B 66) | 1 (W 102) | 7.5 | 101 | 107 | 2165 |
| 76 | (Armenia) Susanna Gaboyan | 2035 | 0 (B 67) | 0 (W 41) | 1 (B 136) | 1 (W 116) | 0 (B 47) | 1 (W 59) | 0 (B 111) | 1 (W 85) | 0 (B 99) | 0 (B 102) | 1 (W 104) | 1 (B 91) | ½ (W 61) | 1 (W 89) | 0 (B 43) | 7.5 | 101 | 105 | 2235 |
| 77 | (FIDE) Diana Preobrazhenskaya | 2116 | 0 (W 12) | 1 (B 137) | 1 (W 79) | 0 (B 80) | 0 (W 110) | 1 (B 108) | 0 (W 14) | 0 (B 113) | 1 (W 122) | 0 (B 72) | 1 (W 130) | 1 (B 78) | 0 (W 54) | ½ (B 87) | 1 (B 98) | 7.5 | 100.5 | 104 | 2203 |
| 78 | (China) Chen Yining | 2271 | 0 (B 42) | 0 (W 115) | 1 (B 127) | ½ (W 129) | 1 (B 118) | 0 (W 52) | ½ (B 69) | 1 (W 105) | 0 (B 51) | 1 (W 83) | 0 (B 33) | 0 (W 77) | 1 (B 131) | 1 (W 112) | ½ (B 62) | 7.5 | 98.5 | 103.5 | 2111 |
| 79 | (Turkey) Ekaterina Atalık | 2248 | 1 (B 128) | 0 (W 4) | 0 (B 77) | 1 (W 105) | 0 (B 92) | 0 (W 112) | ½ (B 123) | ½ (W 115) | ½ (B 69) | ½ (W 131) | 1 (B 114) | 0 (B 93) | 1 (W 121) | 1 (W 107) | ½ (B 70) | 7.5 | 95 | 100 | 2096 |
| 80 | (China) Wang Chuqiao | 2297 | ½ (B 118) | ½ (W 56) | 1 (B 44) | 1 (W 77) | ½ (B 62) | 0 (W 3) | ½ (B 98) | 1 (W 63) | 1 (B 17) | 1 (W 22) | 0 (B 19) | 0 (W 4) | 0 (B 51) | 0 (W 31) | 0 (B 40) | 7 | 121.5 | 127.5 | 2250 |
| 81 | (Kazakhstan) Elnaz Kaliakhmet | 2144 | ½ (B 28) | 0 (W 2) | ½ (B 85) | 1 (W 57) | 1 (B 36) | ½ (W 65) | 1 (B 89) | 0 (W 30) | 1 (B 43) | 1 (W 35) | 0 (B 20) | ½ (W 46) | 0 (B 34) | 0 (W 55) | 0 (B 59) | 7 | 121 | 128 | 2324 |
| 82 | (Vietnam) Phạm Lê Thảo Nguyên | 2200 | 1 (W 137) | 0 (B 30) | ½ (W 29) | 1 (B 49) | ½ (W 32) | 0 (B 10) | 1 (W 94) | 1 (B 84) | 0 (W 13) | 1 (B 23) | 0 (W 53) | 1 (B 110) | 0 (W 16) | 0 (B 35) | 0 (W 60) | 7 | 119.5 | 123 | 2291 |
| 83 | (Poland) Michalina Rudzinska | 2156 | 0 (B 22) | 1 (W 107) | 1 (B 36) | 1 (W 35) | 0 (B 6) | 0 (W 34) | 1 (B 85) | 0 (W 5) | 0 (B 55) | 0 (B 78) | 0 (W 93) | 1 (W 119) | 1 (B 115) | 0 (W 59) | 1 (W 113) | 7 | 114 | 120 | 2248 |
| 84 | (Poland) Liwia Jarocka | 2134 | 0 (B 35) | 1 (W 136) | 1 (B 59) | 0 (W 50) | ½ (B 85) | ½ (W 55) | 1 (B 99) | 0 (W 82) | 0 (B 49) | 1 (B 87) | 0 (W 110) | 0 (W 36) | 1 (B 114) | 1 (W 88) | 0 (B 57) | 7 | 105 | 109 | 2266 |
| 85 | (United States) Irina Krush | 2268 | ½ (W 90) | 0 (B 121) | ½ (W 81) | 1 (B 117) | ½ (W 84) | ½ (B 33) | 0 (W 83) | 0 (B 76) | 1 (B 74) | 1 (W 56) | 0 (B 45) | 1 (W 112) | 0 (W 31) | 1 (B 93) | 0 (W 54) | 7 | 104.5 | 110 | 2128 |
| 86 | (Poland) Katarzyna Dwilewicz | 2161 | ½ (B 2) | 0 (W 28) | 1 (B 60) | 0 (W 5) | 0 (B 15) | 0 (W 74) | 1 (B 134) | ½ (W 119) | 1 (B 115) | 0 (W 89) | 0 (B 107) | 0 (W 114) | 1 (B 128) | 1 (W 131) | 1 (B 112) | 7 | 104.5 | 109.5 | 2162 |
| 87 | (Italy) Alexandra Shvedova | 2249 | 1 (W 106) | 0 (B 23) | 1 (W 100) | 1 (B 121) | 0 (B 1) | 0 (W 63) | 1 (B 70) | 0 (W 112) | 0 (B 42) | 0 (W 84) | 1 (B 105) | 1 (W 131) | 0 (B 56) | ½ (W 77) | ½ (B 91) | 7 | 104.5 | 109.5 | 2156 |
| 88 | (Azerbaijan) Khanim Balajayeva | 2233 | ½ (W 119) | 1 (B 133) | 0 (W 32) | ½ (B 95) | 1 (W 121) | 1 (B 92) | ½ (W 13) | 0 (B 29) | 0 (W 39) | ½ (B 96) | 1 (W 75) | 0 (B 64) | 0 (W 58) | 0 (B 84) | 1 (W 117) | 7 | 104 | 109 | 2189 |
| 89 | (India) Vantika Agrawal | 2329 | 1 (W 94) | 0 (B 9) | 1 (W 104) | 0 (B 56) | 0 (W 64) | 1 (B 117) | 0 (W 81) | ½ (B 92) | ½ (W 72) | 1 (B 86) | ½ (W 102) | 0 (B 68) | 1 (W 96) | 0 (B 76) | ½ (W 74) | 7 | 103 | 109 | 2148 |
| 90 | (Montenegro) Alexandra Zherebtsova | 2055 | ½ (B 85) | 1 (W 60) | 0 (B 28) | 0 (W 66) | 1 (B 48) | 0 (W 98) | 0 (B 15) | ½ (W 68) | ½ (B 116) | 1 (W 118) | 0 (B 67) | 0 (B 100) | 1 (W 130) | 1 (B 96) | ½ (W 101) | 7 | 103 | 108.5 | 2222 |
| 91 | (FIDE) Anna Zhurova | 2133 | 1 (B 57) | 1 (W 15) | 0 (B 6) | 0 (W 67) | 0 (B 65) | 0 (B 75) | 0 (W 106) | 1 (W 109) | ½ (B 114) | 0 (W 69) | 1 (B 126) | 0 (W 76) | 1 (B 124) | 1 (B 127) | ½ (W 87) | 7 | 103 | 108.5 | 2168 |
| 92 | (FIDE) Iren Lyutsinger | 2088 | 0 (B 15) | 1 (W 57) | 0 (B 99) | 1 (B 108) | 1 (W 79) | 0 (W 88) | 0 (B 41) | ½ (W 89) | 1 (B 67) | 0 (B 75) | 0 (W 97) | 1 (W 128) | 0 (B 98) | ½ (W 116) | 1 (B 111) | 7 | 101 | 106.5 | 2251 |
| 93 | (FIDE) Veronika Shubenkova | 2047 | 0 (W 110) | 1 (B 73) | 0 (W 97) | 0 (B 64) | 0 (B 113) | 1 (W 107) | 0 (B 59) | 1 (W 135) | 0 (B 45) | 1 (W 109) | 1 (B 83) | 1 (W 79) | 0 (B 55) | 0 (W 85) | 1 (B 116) | 7 | 98.5 | 103 | 2189 |
| 94 | (Kazakhstan) Amina Kairbekova | 2123 | 0 (B 89) | 1 (W 138) | 0 (B 67) | 0 (W 36) | 1 (B 124) | 1 (W 113) | 0 (B 82) | 0 (W 59) | 1 (B 128) | 1 (W 111) | 0 (B 43) | 0 (B 60) | 0 (W 74) | 1 (W 114) | 1 (B 110) | 7 | 97.5 | 99.5 | 2206 |
| 95 | (Uzbekistan) Madinabonu Khalilova | 2140 | 0 (B 6) | 1 (W 139) | ½ (B 15) | ½ (W 88) | 1 (B 59) | 1 (W 99) | 0 (B 30) | 1 (W 34) | ½ (B 35) | 0 (W 20) | 0 (B 14) | ½ (W 55) | ½ (B 75) | 0 (W 46) | 0 (B 67) | 6.5 | 120 | 121 | 2303 |
| 96 | (Azerbaijan) Govhar Beydullayeva | 2149 | 0 (B 3) | 1 (W 134) | ½ (B 5) | 1 (W 15) | ½ (B 34) | 0 (W 35) | 1 (B 55) | ½ (W 43) | 0 (B 24) | ½ (W 88) | ½ (B 36) | 0 (W 65) | 0 (B 89) | 0 (W 90) | 1 (B 124) | 6.5 | 119 | 124 | 2255 |
| 97 | (Azerbaijan) Turkan Mamedyarova | 2210 | 1 (B 134) | 0 (W 6) | 1 (B 93) | 0 (W 4) | 1 (B 106) | ½ (W 56) | 1 (B 131) | 0 (W 2) | 0 (B 20) | 0 (W 15) | 1 (B 92) | 0 (W 42) | 0 (B 100) | 0 (W 105) | 1 (B 127) | 6.5 | 112.5 | 117.5 | 2175 |
| 98 | (FIDE) Olga Girya | 2195 | ½ (W 53) | 0 (B 13) | 1 (W 119) | 0 (B 24) | 1 (W 126) | 1 (B 90) | ½ (W 80) | ½ (B 39) | 0 (W 25) | 0 (B 47) | 1 (W 100) | 0 (B 23) | 1 (W 92) | 0 (B 73) | 0 (W 77) | 6.5 | 112 | 117.5 | 2263 |
| 99 | (India) Rakshitta Ravi | 2218 | 1 (W 130) | 0 (B 38) | 1 (W 92) | 0 (W 1) | 1 (B 42) | 0 (B 95) | 0 (W 84) | 1 (B 122) | 1 (W 76) | 1 (W 46) | 0 (B 51) | 0 (B 32) | 0 (W 60) | 0 (B 74) | ½ (W 106) | 6.5 | 109 | 114.5 | 2183 |
| 100 | (Georgia (country)) Anastasia Kirtadze | 2119 | 1 (B 36) | 0 (W 50) | 0 (B 87) | 0 (W 59) | 1 (B 107) | ½ (W 57) | 0 (B 49) | 0 (W 74) | 1 (B 119) | 1 (W 123) | 0 (B 98) | 1 (W 90) | 1 (W 97) | 0 (B 47) | 0 (W 66) | 6.5 | 104.5 | 110 | 2213 |
| 101 | (Qatar) Zhu Chen | 2300 | 0 (B 69) | 1 (W 105) | 0 (B 56) | 0 (W 44) | ½ (B 125) | 1 (W 118) | 1 (B 115) | 1 (W 131) | 0 (B 21) | 0 (W 52) | 1 (B 116) | 0 (W 41) | ½ (B 62) | 0 (W 70) | ½ (B 90) | 6.5 | 102 | 107 | 2124 |
| 102 | (India) P. V. Nandhidhaa | 2174 | 0 (B 4) | ½ (W 123) | ½ (B 114) | 0 (W 106) | 1 (B 127) | 1 (W 105) | 0 (B 36) | 1 (W 128) | 0 (B 59) | 1 (W 76) | ½ (B 89) | 0 (W 67) | 0 (B 69) | 1 (W 121) | 0 (B 75) | 6.5 | 100.5 | 106 | 2170 |
| 103 | (Uzbekistan) Nilufar Yakubbaeva | 2149 | 0 (W 38) | 1 (B 109) | ½ (W 24) | 0 (B 25) | 1 (W 49) | 0 (B 71) | 0 (B 57) | 0 (W 124) | ½ (W 125) | 0 (B 127) | 1 (W 120) | 0 (B 106) | 1 (W 135) | ½ (B 108) | 1 (W 129) | 6.5 | 99 | 103.5 | 2162 |
| 104 | (Azerbaijan) Zeinab Mamedyarova | 2170 | 0 (B 47) | 1 (W 124) | 0 (B 89) | 1 (W 128) | 0 (B 35) | 0 (W 42) | 1 (B 127) | 1 (W 123) | 0 (B 34) | 0 (W 113) | 0 (B 76) | 0 (W 115) | 1 (B 119) | 1 (W 118) | ½ (B 107) | 6.5 | 96.5 | 102 | 2130 |
| 105 | (Bulgaria) Beloslava Krasteva | 2090 | 0 (W 26) | 0 (B 101) | 1 (W 135) | 0 (B 79) | 1 (W 109) | 0 (B 102) | 1 (W 120) | 0 (B 78) | 1 (W 108) | 0 (B 64) | 0 (W 87) | ½ (B 130) | 1 (W 123) | 1 (B 97) | 0 (B 68) | 6.5 | 95.5 | 100 | 2153 |
| 106 | (India) Parnali S Dharia | 2032 | 0 (B 87) | 0 (W 116) | 1 (B 138) | 1 (B 102) | 0 (W 97) | 0 (W 45) | 1 (B 91) | 0 (W 55) | 0 (B 70) | 1 (W 135) | 0 (B 56) | 1 (W 103) | 0 (B 112) | 1 (W 126) | ½ (B 99) | 6.5 | 94 | 96 | 2129 |
| 107 | (FIDE) Galina Mikheeva | 1927 | 0 (W 61) | 0 (B 83) | 0 (W 72) | 1 (B 135) | 0 (W 100) | 0 (B 93) | 1 (W 136) | 0 (B 117) | 1 (W 137) | 1 (B 125) | 1 (W 86) | 0 (B 48) | 1 (W 129) | 0 (B 79) | ½ (W 104) | 6.5 | 90.5 | 94 | 2087 |
| 108 | (China) Zhang Lanlin | 2235 | 1 (B 124) | 0 (W 22) | 0 (B 115) | 0 (W 92) | 1 (B 128) | 0 (W 77) | 0 (B 114) | 1 (W 132) | 0 (B 105) | 1 (W 119) | 0 (B 131) | 0 (W 118) | 1 (B 120) | ½ (W 103) | 1 (B 123) | 6.5 | 88.5 | 93.5 | 2074 |
| 109 | (Montenegro) Marija Zvereva | 1942 | 0 (B 55) | 0 (W 103) | 0 (B 112) | 1 (W 138) | 0 (B 105) | 0 (W 116) | 1 (W 140) | 0 (B 91) | 1 (W 133) | 0 (B 93) | ½ (W 125) | 0 (B 129) | 1 (B 139) | 1 (W 128) | 1 (B 121) | 6.5 | 77 | 78 | 2033 |
| 110 | (Peru) Deysi Cori | 2267 | 1 (B 93) | 0 (W 46) | 0 (B 40) | 1 (W 112) | 1 (B 77) | 1 (W 41) | 0 (B 22) | 1 (W 51) | 0 (B 4) | 0 (W 44) | 1 (B 84) | 0 (W 82) | 0 (B 33) | 0 (W 62) | 0 (W 94) | 6 | 114.5 | 120.5 | 2204 |
| 111 | (India) Savitha Shri B | 2199 | 1 (B 140) | 1 (W 5) | 0 (W 38) | 1 (B 75) | 0 (W 13) | 0 (B 11) | 1 (W 76) | 0 (B 23) | 0 (W 32) | 0 (B 94) | 0 (W 117) | 0 (B 127) | 1 (W 134) | 1 (B 132) | 0 (W 92) | 6 | 108.5 | 109.5 | 2205 |
| 112 | (China) Gu Xiaobing | 2098 | 0 (W 24) | 0 (B 10) | 1 (W 109) | 0 (B 110) | 1 (W 130) | 1 (B 79) | 1 (W 33) | 1 (B 87) | 0 (W 26) | 0 (B 54) | 0 (W 71) | 0 (B 85) | 1 (W 106) | 0 (B 78) | 0 (W 86) | 6 | 108 | 113.5 | 2224 |
| 113 | (Georgia (country)) Bella Khotenashvili | 2342 | 0 (B 44) | 1 (W 117) | 0 (B 52) | 0 (B 29) | 1 (W 93) | 0 (B 94) | 1 (W 121) | 1 (W 77) | 0 (B 63) | 1 (B 104) | 0 (W 58) | 0 (W 56) | 1 (B 118) | 0 (W 69) | 0 (B 83) | 6 | 103.5 | 109 | 2123 |
| 114 | (Italy) Aleksandra Dimitrijevic | 2063 | 0 (W 37) | ½ (B 71) | ½ (W 102) | ½ (B 72) | 0 (W 14) | ½ (B 58) | 1 (W 108) | 0 (B 64) | ½ (W 91) | ½ (B 117) | 0 (W 79) | 1 (B 86) | 0 (W 84) | 0 (B 94) | 1 (W 133) | 6 | 103.5 | 108.5 | 2190 |
| 115 | (Georgia (country)) Kesaria Mgeladze | 2068 | 0 (W 25) | 1 (B 78) | 1 (W 108) | 0 (B 54) | ½ (W 73) | 0 (B 31) | 0 (W 101) | ½ (B 79) | 0 (W 86) | 0 (B 130) | 1 (W 133) | 1 (B 104) | 0 (W 83) | 0 (B 117) | 1 (B 134) | 6 | 99 | 104 | 2169 |
| 116 | (Turkey) Aydin Gulenay | 2177 | 0 (W 32) | 1 (B 106) | 0 (W 75) | 0 (B 76) | 0 (W 120) | 1 (B 109) | 0 (W 122) | 1 (B 130) | ½ (W 90) | 1 (B 74) | 0 (W 101) | 0 (B 121) | 1 (W 125) | ½ (B 92) | 0 (W 93) | 6 | 94.5 | 100 | 2096 |
| 117 | (Kazakhstan) Assel Serikbay | 2093 | 0 (B 5) | 0 (B 113) | 1 (W 130) | 0 (W 85) | 1 (B 134) | 0 (W 89) | 0 (B 124) | 1 (W 107) | ½ (B 123) | ½ (W 114) | 1 (B 111) | 0 (W 59) | 0 (B 70) | 1 (W 115) | 0 (B 88) | 6 | 94.5 | 99.5 | 2145 |
| 118 | (Mexico) Tania Miranda Rodriguez | 2070 | ½ (W 80) | 0 (B 75) | 0 (W 71) | 1 (B 119) | 0 (W 78) | 0 (B 101) | ½ (W 133) | 1 (B 120) | 0 (W 58) | 0 (B 90) | 1 (W 137) | 1 (B 108) | 0 (W 113) | 0 (B 104) | 1 (W 132) | 6 | 92 | 95.5 | 2158 |
| 119 | (India) Isha Sharma | 1955 | ½ (B 88) | 0 (W 43) | 0 (B 98) | 0 (W 118) | 1 (B 60) | 0 (W 125) | 1 (W 129) | ½ (B 86) | 0 (W 100) | 0 (B 108) | 1 (W 132) | 0 (B 83) | 0 (W 104) | 1 (B 138) | 1 (B 131) | 6 | 90.5 | 92.5 | 2153 |
| 120 | (FIDE) Olga Druzhinina | 1946 | 1 (W 73) | 0 (B 53) | 0 (B 68) | 0 (W 45) | 1 (B 116) | 0 (W 49) | 0 (B 105) | 0 (W 118) | 0 (B 135) | 1 (W 138) | 0 (B 103) | 1 (B 140) | 0 (W 108) | 1 (B 136) | 1 (W 139) | 6 | 83 | 84 | 2078 |
| 121 | (Norway) Monika Machlik | 2065 | ½ (B 60) | 1 (W 85) | ½ (B 3) | 0 (W 87) | 0 (B 88) | 0 (W 36) | 0 (B 113) | 1 (W 134) | ½ (B 68) | 0 (W 67) | 1 (B 123) | 1 (W 116) | 0 (B 79) | 0 (B 102) | 0 (W 109) | 5.5 | 102 | 107 | 2219 |
| 122 | (Palestine) Eman Sawan | 1836 | 1 (B 66) | 0 (W 8) | 0 (B 41) | 1 (W 60) | 0 (B 21) | 0 (W 44) | 1 (B 116) | 0 (W 99) | 0 (B 77) | ½ (W 128) | 0 (W 74) | 0 (B 125) | 1 (W 140) | 0 (B 129) | 1 (W 136) | 5.5 | 100 | 101 | 2129 |
| 123 | (Uzbekistan) Guldona Karimova | 1991 | 0 (W 54) | ½ (B 102) | 0 (W 33) | 1 (B 58) | 0 (W 72) | 1 (B 129) | ½ (W 79) | 0 (B 104) | ½ (W 117) | 0 (B 100) | 0 (W 121) | 1 (W 126) | 0 (B 105) | 1 (B 130) | 0 (W 108) | 5.5 | 95 | 100.5 | 2154 |
| 124 | (Kyrgyzstan) Assel Lesbekova | 1978 | 0 (W 108) | 0 (B 104) | 0 (W 73) | 1 (B 136) | 0 (W 94) | 1 (B 135) | 1 (W 117) | 1 (B 103) | ½ (W 61) | 0 (B 49) | 0 (W 60) | 0 (B 69) | 0 (W 91) | 1 (B 125) | 0 (W 96) | 5.5 | 95 | 99 | 2149 |
| 125 | (China) Li Xueyi | 2076 | 0 (B 50) | 0 (W 36) | 1 (B 134) | 0 (B 73) | ½ (W 101) | 1 (B 119) | 0 (W 48) | 0 (W 60) | ½ (B 103) | 0 (W 107) | ½ (B 109) | 1 (W 122) | 0 (B 116) | 0 (W 124) | 1 (B 137) | 5.5 | 95 | 98.5 | 2106 |
| 126 | (Kazakhstan) Alanna Berikkyzy | 2044 | ½ (B 43) | 0 (W 21) | 0 (B 66) | 1 (W 133) | 0 (B 98) | 0 (W 48) | 0 (B 60) | 1 (W 136) | 1 (B 129) | 0 (W 68) | 0 (W 91) | 0 (B 123) | 1 (W 137) | 0 (B 106) | 1 (W 135) | 5.5 | 94 | 97.5 | 2075 |
| 127 | (Egypt) Shahenda Wafa | 1980 | 0 (B 65) | 0 (W 52) | 0 (W 78) | 1 (B 139) | 0 (W 102) | 1 (B 136) | 0 (W 104) | 0 (B 58) | 1 (B 134) | 1 (W 103) | ½ (B 70) | 1 (W 111) | 0 (B 72) | 0 (W 91) | 0 (W 97) | 5.5 | 94 | 95 | 2137 |
| 128 | (Norway) Christine Nordahl | 2010 | 0 (W 79) | 0 (B 64) | 1 (W 137) | 0 (B 104) | 0 (W 108) | 1 (B 130) | 1 (W 58) | 0 (B 102) | 0 (W 94) | ½ (B 122) | 1 (W 129) | 0 (B 92) | 0 (W 86) | 0 (B 109) | 1 (W 140) | 5.5 | 90 | 91 | 2068 |
| 129 | (Spain) Fernandez Jimenez Rebeca | 2099 | 0 (B 20) | 1 (W 140) | 0 (B 65) | ½ (B 78) | 0 (W 71) | 0 (W 123) | 0 (B 119) | 1 (B 133) | 0 (W 126) | 1 (W 134) | 0 (B 128) | 1 (W 109) | 0 (B 107) | 1 (W 122) | 0 (B 103) | 5.5 | 89.5 | 90.5 | 2044 |
| 130 | (Syria) Manar Khalil | 1887 | 0 (B 99) | 0 (W 70) | 0 (B 117) | 1 (W 140) | 0 (B 112) | 0 (W 128) | 1 (B 137) | 0 (W 116) | 1 (B 132) | 1 (W 115) | 0 (B 77) | ½ (W 105) | 0 (B 90) | 0 (W 123) | 1 (W 138) | 5.5 | 80.5 | 81.5 | 2023 |
| 131 | (Spain) Redondo Rodriguez Adhara | 2070 | 0 (B 59) | ½ (W 66) | 1 (W 58) | 1 (B 14) | 1 (W 25) | 0 (B 12) | 0 (W 97) | 0 (B 101) | 0 (W 48) | ½ (B 79) | 1 (W 108) | 0 (B 87) | 0 (W 78) | 0 (B 86) | 0 (W 119) | 5 | 110 | 116 | 2247 |
| 132 | (United Arab Emirates) Essa Rouda Alserkal | 2006 | 0 (B 34) | 0 (W 45) | 1 (B 140) | 0 (W 63) | 0 (B 57) | 0 (W 134) | 1 (B 138) | 0 (B 108) | 0 (W 130) | 1 (W 136) | 0 (B 119) | 1 (W 139) | 1 (B 133) | 0 (W 111) | 0 (B 118) | 5 | 80 | 81 | 2012 |
| 133 | (Lebanon) Nadia Fawaz | 1802 | ½ (B 21) | 0 (W 88) | 0 (B 57) | 0 (B 126) | 0 (W 58) | 1 (W 138) | ½ (B 118) | 0 (W 129) | 0 (B 109) | 1 (W 140) | 0 (B 115) | 1 (B 137) | 0 (W 132) | 1 (W 139) | 0 (B 114) | 5 | 79.5 | 80.5 | 2026 |
| 134 | (Norway) Ingrid Skaslien | 1873 | 0 (W 97) | 0 (B 96) | 0 (W 125) | 1 (B 137) | 0 (W 117) | 1 (B 132) | 0 (W 86) | 0 (B 121) | 0 (W 127) | 0 (B 129) | 1 (B 139) | 1 (W 138) | 0 (B 111) | 1 (B 140) | 0 (W 115) | 5 | 71.5 | 72.5 | 2015 |
| 135 | (Saudi Arabia) Dalia Alsemairi | 1692 | 0 (B 48) | 0 (W 40) | 0 (B 105) | 0 (W 107) | 1 (B 140) | 0 (W 124) | 1 (W 139) | 0 (B 93) | 1 (W 120) | 0 (B 106) | 0 (B 138) | 1 (W 136) | 0 (B 103) | ½ (W 137) | 0 (B 126) | 4.5 | 77.5 | 78.5 | 1955 |
| 136 | (Morocco) Wissal Echcharbiny | 1736 | 0 (W 9) | 0 (B 84) | 0 (W 76) | 0 (W 124) | 1 (B 137) | 0 (W 127) | 0 (B 107) | 0 (B 126) | 1 (W 139) | 0 (B 132) | 1 (W 140) | 0 (B 135) | 1 (B 138) | 0 (W 120) | 0 (B 122) | 4 | 75 | 76 | 1920 |
| 137 | (Hong Kong) Chloe Hailey Lau | 1611 | 0 (B 82) | 0 (W 77) | 0 (B 128) | 0 (W 134) | 0 (W 136) | 1 (B 140) | 0 (W 130) | 1 (B 138) | 0 (B 107) | 1 (W 139) | 0 (B 118) | 0 (W 133) | 0 (B 126) | ½ (B 135) | 0 (W 125) | 3.5 | 70.5 | 71.5 | 1923 |
| 138 | (Qatar) Ghada Al-Khulaifi | 1663 | 0 (W 31) | 0 (B 94) | 0 (W 106) | 0 (B 109) | 1 (W 139) | 0 (B 133) | 0 (W 132) | 0 (W 137) | 0 (B 140) | 0 (B 120) | 1 (W 135) | 0 (B 134) | 0 (W 136) | 0 (W 119) | 0 (B 130) | 2 | 74.5 | 75.5 | 1902 |
| 139 | (Saudi Arabia) Mohammed Abrar Ahmad Almalki | 1826 | 0 (W 27) | 0 (B 95) | 0 (W 74) | 0 (W 127) | 0 (B 138) | 0 (W 60) | 0 (B 135) | 1 (W 140) | 0 (B 136) | 0 (B 137) | 0 (W 134) | 0 (B 132) | 0 (W 109) | 0 (B 133) | 0 (B 120) | 1 | 78 | 79 | 1925 |
| 140 | (Saudi Arabia) Maitha Alotaibi Abdulrahman A | 1600 | 0 (W 111) | 0 (B 129) | 0 (W 132) | 0 (B 130) | 0 (W 135) | 0 (W 137) | 0 (B 109) | 0 (B 139) | 1 (W 138) | 0 (B 133) | 0 (B 136) | 0 (W 120) | 0 (B 122) | 0 (W 134) | 0 (B 128) | 1 | 69.5 | 70.5 | 1894 |

=== Knockout stage ===
Semifinals
1 | (Kazakhstan) Bibisara Assaubayeva | 1 | 1 | 1 | – | 3
4 | (China) Zhu Jiner | 0 | 0 | 0 | – | 0
2 | (Ukraine) Anna Muzychuk | 1 | ½ | 0 | 1 | 2½
3 | (Netherlands) Eline Roebers | 0 | ½ | 1 | 0 | 1½

Finals
(Kazakhstan) Bibisara Assaubayeva | ½ | ½ | ½ | 1 | 2½
(Ukraine) Anna Muzychuk | ½ | ½ | ½ | 0 | 1½
