= World Blitz Chess Championship 2021 =

Global chess tournament

- Warsaw, Poland
- 29–30 December 2021
	World Blitz Champion	Women's; World Blitz Champion
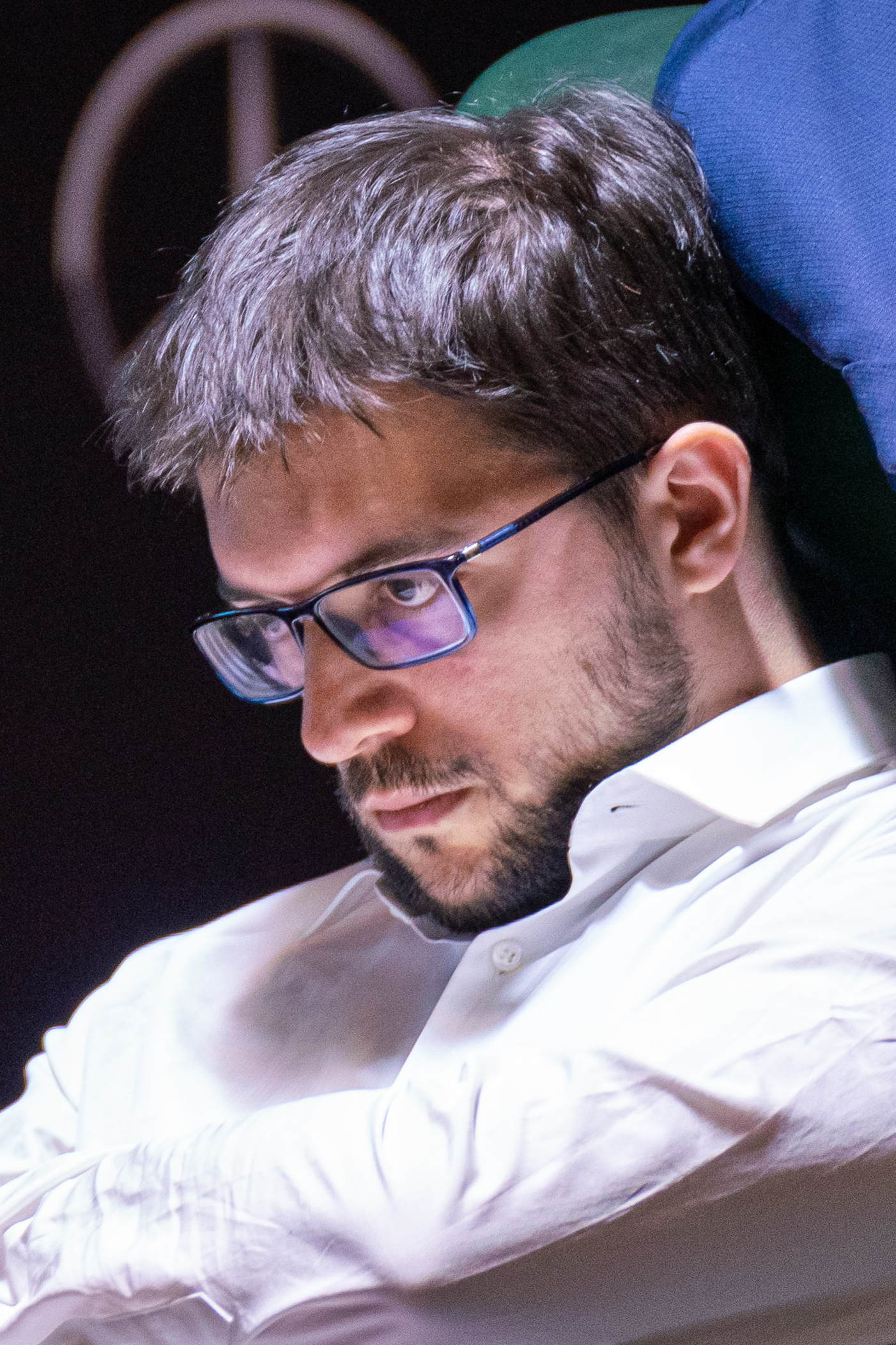
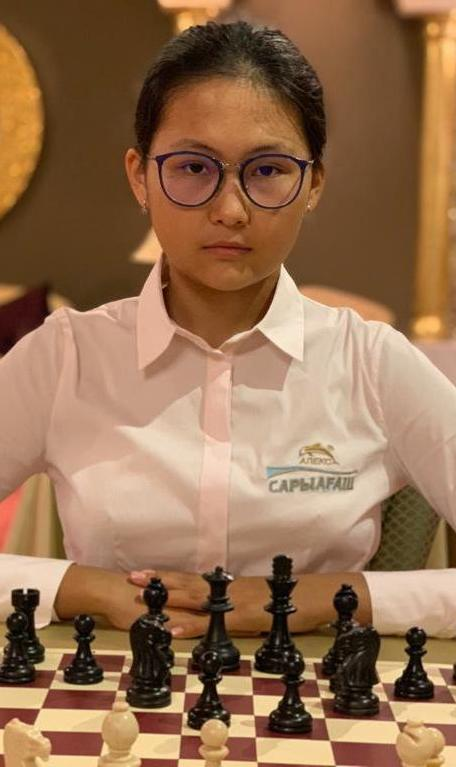
	(France) Maxime Vachier-Lagrave	(Kazakhstan) Bibisara Assaubayeva
15/21	Scores	14/17

The 2021 World Blitz Chess Championship was an annual chess tournament held by FIDE to determine the world champion in chess played under blitz time controls. Since 2012, FIDE has held the World Rapid and Blitz Championships at a joint tournament. Originally, the tournament was to be held in Nur-Sultan, Kazakhstan, however, due to coronavirus restrictions introduced by the Kazakh government prompted FIDE to change the location to Warsaw, Poland. The event took place at the Narodowy Stadium in Warsaw, from 29 to 30 December 2021, using a Swiss-system with 21 rounds for the open tournament and 17 rounds for the women's tournament.

== Participants ==
179 players took part in the open tournament and 105 in the women's tournament.

Code	Federation	Open	Women's	Total
ALG	Algeria	1	0	1
ARG	Argentina	1	1	2
ARM	Armenia	9	2	11
AUT	Austria	2	0	2
AZE	Azerbaijan	7	5	12
BIH	Bosnia and Herzegovina	1	0	1
BRA	Brazil	1	2	3
BUL	Bulgaria	1	2	3
CRO	Croatia	1	0	1
CZE	(Czech Republic) Czechia	3	1	4
DEN	Denmark	1	0	1
ECU	Ecuador	0	1	1
EGY	Egypt	3	0	3
ENG	England	1	0	1
FRA	France	2	1	3
GEO	(Georgia (country)) Georgia	3	2	5
GER	Germany	7	3	10
GRE	Greece	3	1	4
HUN	Hungary	4	0	4
IND	India	12	4	16
IRI	Iran	2	1	3
IRQ	Iraq	1	0	1
ISR	Israel	3	2	5
ITA	Italy	2	0	2
KAZ	Kazakhstan	1	6	7
KOS	Kosovo	1	0	1
KGZ	Kyrgyzstan	1	1	2
LBA	Libya	1	0	1
LTU	Lithuania	0	1	1
LUX	Luxembourg	0	1	1
MDA	Moldova	1	0	1
MGL	Mongolia	0	1	1
NED	Netherlands	3	1	4
NOR	Norway	4	0	4
POL	Poland (host)	31	25	56
ROU	Romania	3	2	5
CFR	Russia (Note: All Russian players competed under the Chess Federation of Russia flag, due to WADA sanctions against Russia.)	29	22	51
SRB	Serbia	2	1	3
SLO	Slovenia	0	1	1
ESP	Spain	4	2	6
SWE	Sweden	1	0	1
TJK	Tajikistan	1	0	1
TUR	Turkey	1	1	2
UKR	Ukraine	9	11	20
UAE	United Arab Emirates	1	0	1
USA	United States	7	1	8
UZB	Uzbekistan	4	0	4
VEN	Venezuela	1	0	1
YEM	Yemen	1	0	1
FID	(FIDE) none	1	0	1

== Tiebreak regulations ==
For players who finish on the same score, final position was determined by the following tie-breaks, in order:

1. Buchholz Cut 1
2. Buchholz
3. Average Rating of Opponents Cut 1 (average rating of opponents excluding the lowest rated opponent)
4. Results of individual games between tied players
5. Drawing of lots

If two or more players were tied for any position other than first, the above mentioned tiebreak system decided the ranking of the tied players.

If two or more players were tied for first, the top two players who finished the highest on the above mentioned tiebreaks would play a two game mini match with the time control of 3+2 (with colours of the first game drawn) to decide the winner. If the score was tied 1-1, the players would continue to play single 3+2 games until one of the players won one game (the player who finished highest on the above mentioned tiebreaks would have the white pieces for the first game and the colours would alternate from the next game).

== COVID-19 impacts tournament ==
The 2021 World Blitz Chess Championship was held in the Polish capital Warsaw, a day after the longer time-format World Rapid Chess Championship finished in the same venue, after Kazakhstan pulled out of hosting duties due to the spread of the omicron variant.

The event was disrupted when some players tested positive for the coronavirus and had to withdraw from the tournament. Among them was Hikaru Nakamura, one of the leading contenders to take the title.

French star Maxime Vachier-Lagrave ultimately walked away with the men's blitz title.

== Open tournament results ==
The following table lists all participants, with the results from the 21 rounds. They are ranked according to the results, taking into account the tie-breaks.

Notation: "1 (W 168)" indicates a win (1 point) with white pieces (W) against player who finished in 168th place.

Rank	Name	Rating	1	2	3	4	5	6	7	8	9	10	11	12	13	14	15	16	17	18	19	20	21	Total	BC1	BS	AROC1
1	(France) Maxime Vachier-Lagrave	2787	1 (W 168)	½ (B 138)	1 (W 31)	0 (B 18)	½ (W 174)	1 (W 173)	1 (B 87)	1 (B 61)	0 (W 27)	0 (B 28)	1 (W 41)	1 (W 56)	1 (B 33)	½ (B 16)	1 (W 8)	½ (B 13)	1 (W 5)	1 (B 24)	½ (W 4)	½ (B 7)	1 (W 12)	15	244	251½	2660
2	(Poland) Jan-Krzysztof Duda	2792	1 (W 121)	0 (B 143)	1 (W 168)	½ (B 42)	1 (W 53)	1 (B 79)	1 (B 18)	1 (W 99)	0 (W 5)	½ (B 27)	1 (W 78)	0 (B 28)	0 (W 11)	1 (B 85)	1 (W 52)	1 (B 9)	1 (W 13)	0 (W 4)	1 (B 10)	1 (B 17)	1 (W 7)	15	242	249½	2640
3	(France) Alireza Firouzja	2810	0 (W 80)	½ (B 116)	½ (W 69)	1 (B 74)	1 (W 92)	0 (B 37)	1 (W 136)	1 (W 82)	0 (B 54)	1 (B 50)	1 (W 46)	1 (B 30)	0 (W 52)	1 (W 100)	1 (B 43)	0 (B 28)	1 (W 26)	1 (B 13)	1 (W 24)	1 (B 4)	1 (W 5)	15	237	245½	2609
4	Daniil Dubov	2749	0 (W 81)	1 (B 124)	1 (W 121)	1 (W 97)	½ (B 41)	1 (W 143)	1 (B 10)	1 (W 131)	½ (B 13)	1 (W 6)	½ (B 9)	0 (B 5)	1 (W 142)	1 (W 27)	1 (W 11)	½ (B 24)	½ (W 7)	1 (B 2)	½ (B 1)	0 (W 3)	½ (W 16)	14½	253½	262	2670
5	(United States) Levon Aronian	2740	1 (B 90)	1 (W 117)	½ (B 143)	1 (W 110)	0 (B 131)	1 (W 41)	1 (B 26)	1 (W 14)	1 (B 2)	1 (W 9)	½ (B 13)	1 (W 4)	1 (B 27)	½ (W 24)	½ (B 25)	1 (W 16)	0 (B 1)	0 (W 11)	0 (W 7)	1 (B 8)	0 (B 3)	14	256	264½	2682
6	(Azerbaijan) Shakhriyar Mamedyarov	2754	1 (W 35)	½ (B 10)	1 (W 138)	1 (B 51)	1 (W 18)	1 (W 78)	½ (B 9)	0 (B 8)	1 (W 12)	0 (B 4)	(W 99)	0 (B 11)	1 (W 54)	1 (B 52)	0 (W 13)	½ (B 26)	1 (W 81)	½ (B 42)	1 (W 29)	½ (B 16)	1 (W 17)	14	249½	258½	2640
7	Vladislav Artemiev	2830	½ (B 60)	0 (W 135)	0 (B 134)	1 (B 158)	1 (W 103)	1 (W 109)	1 (B 53)	1 (W 41)	0 (B 29)	1 (W 26)	1 (B 17)	1 (W 99)	½ (B 14)	½ (W 13)	1 (B 27)	½ (W 25)	½ (B 4)	1 (W 9)	1 (B 5)	½ (W 1)	0 (B 2)	14	245	253½	2646
8	(Uzbekistan) Javokhir Sindarov	2452	1 (B 36)	½ (W 41)	1 (B 76)	1 (W 17)	1 (B 20)	½ (W 14)	1 (B 78)	1 (W 6)	½ (B 9)	0 (W 13)	0 (B 142)	1 (W 29)	0 (B 24)	1 (W 31)	0 (B 1)	(W 10)	1 (B 53)	1 (W 28)	1 (B 25)	0 (W 5)	½ (W 11)	13½	259	269½	2689
9	Vladimir Fedoseev	2690	1 (W 136)	1 (B 68)	½ (W 51)	1 (B 67)	1 (W 79)	1 (B 12)	½ (W 6)	1 (B 13)	½ (W 8)	0 (B 5)	½ (W 4)	(B 25)	0 (W 16)	1 (B 45)	1 (W 17)	0 (W 2)	1 (B 28)	0 (B 7)	1 (W 42)	(B 11)	½ (W 10)	13½	258½	267	2674
10	Grigoriy Oparin	2580	1 (W 113)	½ (W 6)	1 (B 70)	½ (B 23)	½ (W 16)	1 (B 38)	0 (W 4)	1 (B 46)	0 (W 39)	½ (B 19)	1 (W 43)	0 (W 20)	1 (B 59)	1 (W 33)	½ (B 14)	½ (B 8)	1 (W 32)	1 (B 79)	0 (W 2)	1 (B 29)	½ (B 9)	13½	256	266	2678
11	(Armenia) Haik M. Martirosyan	2707	1 (B 96)	1 (W 99)	0 (B 78)	1 (W 112)	1 (B 68)	1 (W 119)	½ (B 14)	0 (W 24)	0 (B 15)	1 (W 53)	1 (B 49)	1 (W 6)	1 (B 2)	½ (W 12)	0 (B 4)	1 (W 20)	½ (B 16)	1 (B 5)	0 (W 17)	½ (W 9)	½ (B 8)	13½	252½	262	2659
12	(Norway) Magnus Carlsen	2892	1 (B 91)	1 (W 48)	1 (B 37)	1 (W 87)	0 (B 78)	0 (W 9)	1 (B 54)	1 (W 33)	0 (B 6)	1 (W 15)	1 (B 66)	½ (W 24)	1 (W 28)	½ (B 11)	0 (W 16)	0 (B 14)	1 (W 50)	½ (B 17)	1 (B 27)	1 (W 25)	0 (B 1)	13½	252	262½	2664
13	(Ukraine) Martyn Kravtsiv	2638	½ (B 120)	1 (W 139)	1 (B 163)	1 (W 101)	1 (B 173)	1 (W 131)	1 (B 29)	0 (W 9)	½ (W 4)	1 (B 8)	½ (W 5)	0 (B 27)	(W 25)	½ (B 7)	1 (B 6)	½ (W 1)	0 (B 2)	0 (W 3)	1 (B 43)	1 (W 24)	½ (B 14)	13½	250½	258½	2641
14	Alexander Grischuk	2757	1 (B 104)	1 (W 97)	½ (B 110)	1 (W 143)	1 (W 29)	½ (B 8)	½ (W 11)	0 (B 5)	1 (W 58)	½ (B 78)	1 (W 30)	½ (B 142)	½ (W 7)	0 (B 25)	½ (W 10)	1 (W 12)	½ (B 66)	1 (B 35)	½ (W 16)	½ (B 22)	½ (W 13)	13½	248½	257	2665
15	Mikhail Kobalia	2532	½ (B 107)	0 (W 70)	1 (B 57)	1 (W 98)	1 (B 17)	0 (W 21)	1 (W 22)	1 (B 23)	1 (W 11)	0 (B 12)	0 (W 16)	½ (B 42)	0 (W 43)	1 (B 30)	1 (W 47)	1 (B 18)	0 (W 29)	1 (B 71)	½ (W 19)	1 (B 52)	1 (W 32)	13½	247½	257½	2677
16	(Netherlands) Anish Giri	2778	½ (B 103)	1 (W 109)	1 (B 120)	½ (W 41)	½ (B 10)	½ (W 87)	0 (B 131)	1 (W 86)	½ (B 31)	1 (W 61)	1 (B 15)	1 (W 100)	1 (B 9)	½ (W 1)	1 (B 12)	0 (B 5)	½ (W 11)	½ (W 25)	½ (B 14)	½ (W 6)	½ (B 4)	13½	247½	256½	2651
17	Kirill Alekseenko	2663	1 (W 32)	½ (B 79)	1 (W 50)	0 (B 8)	0 (W 15)	0 (B 80)	1 (W 96)	1 (B 91)	1 (W 45)	1 (B 58)	0 (W 7)	1 (B 68)	1 (B 99)	1 (W 66)	0 (B 9)	1 (W 49)	1 (B 27)	½ (W 12)	1 (B 11)	0 (W 2)	0 (B 6)	13	247	257	2619
18	(India) Vidit Gujrathi	2628	1 (W 133)	½ (B 67)	1 (W 105)	1 (W 1)	0 (B 6)	1 (B 66)	0 (W 2)	0 (W 26)	½ (B 51)	1 (B 144)	1 (W 102)	½ (B 19)	½ (B 101)	1 (W 44)	0 (B 20)	0 (W 15)	1 (B 70)	½ (W 53)	1 (W 79)	½ (B 23)	1 (W 43)	13	238½	247	2594
19	(India) Nihal Sarin	2705	1 (W 40)	½ (B 50)	0 (W 79)	1 (B 161)	½ (W 51)	1 (B 121)	½ (W 84)	1 (B 47)	0 (B 99)	½ (W 10)	1 (B 48)	½ (W 18)	0 (B 31)	0 (W 53)	1 (B 62)	½ (W 37)	1 (B 100)	1 (W 45)	½ (B 15)	1 (W 27)	½ (B 20)	13	236	244	2584
20	Alexey Sarana	2672	1 (W 127)	1 (B 112)	1 (W 80)	½ (B 66)	0 (W 8)	1 (B 72)	½ (W 132)	½ (B 58)	½ (W 131)	1 (B 102)	0 (W 25)	1 (B 10)	1 (W 26)	0 (B 28)	1 (W 18)	0 (B 11)	0 (W 35)	1 (W 83)	1 (B 31)	½ (B 32)	½ (W 19)	13	234½	243½	2576
21	(Azerbaijan) Rauf Mamedov	2686	1 (W 74)	0 (B 78)	1 (W 40)	½ (B 174)	1 (W 80)	1 (B 15)	0 (W 99)	1 (B 42)	½ (W 102)	1 (B 131)	0 (W 28)	½ (W 54)	0 (B 45)	½ (B 84)	1 (W 85)	0 (B 32)	½ (W 51)	1 (W 91)	1 (B 83)	½ (B 44)	1 (W 41)	13	225	233½	2569
22	Aleksey Dreev	2641	1 (B 149)	1 (W 44)	½ (B 101)	0 (W 173)	0 (B 26)	1 (W 114)	0 (B 15)	1 (W 109)	0 (B 53)	1 (W 80)	0 (B 45)	1 (W 90)	1 (B 103)	0 (W 49)	1 (B 104)	1 (W 99)	½ (B 31)	1 (W 48)	1 (B 66)	½ (W 14)	½ (B 24)	13	225	233½	2549
23	(Georgia (country)) Giga Quparadze	2658	½ (B 34)	1 (W 153)	1 (B 115)	½ (W 10)	½ (B 132)	0 (W 26)	1 (B 45)	0 (W 15)	1 (B 143)	0 (W 100)	1 (B 86)	1 (W 119)	0 (B 66)	1 (W 68)	0 (B 81)	0 (W 48)	1 (B 90)	1 (W 80)	1 (B 53)	½ (W 18)	1 (B 42)	13	223	231½	2548
24	(India) Arjun Erigaisi	2765	½ (W 69)	1 (B 161)	1 (W 53)	0 (B 79)	1 (W 50)	1 (B 42)	½ (W 58)	1 (B 11)	½ (W 78)	½ (B 99)	1 (W 38)	½ (B 12)	1 (W 8)	½ (B 5)	1 (W 28)	½ (W 4)	(B 25)	0 (W 1)	0 (B 3)	0 (B 13)	½ (W 22)	12½	252	260	2664
25	Ian Nepomniachtchi	2792	½ (B 109)	1 (W 103)	½ (B 135)	1 (W 48)	1 (W 66)	½ (B 99)	½ (B 27)	½ (W 29)	½ (B 26)	1 (W 56)	1 (B 20)	½ (W 9)	½ (B 13)	1 (W 14)	½ (W 5)	½ (B 7)	½ (W 24)	½ (B 16)	0 (W 8)	0 (B 12)	½ (W 36)	12½	249	258	2658
26	(Azerbaijan) Mahammad Muradli	2571	1 (W 172)	0 (B 73)	½ (W 146)	1 (B 141)	1 (W 22)	1 (B 23)	0 (W 5)	1 (B 18)	½ (W 25)	0 (B 7)	1 (W 36)	1 (B 38)	0 (B 20)	1 (W 41)	½ (B 70)	½ (W 6)	0 (B 3)	0 (W 30)	1 (W 46)	1 (B 47)	½ (W 29)	12½	247	252½	2645
27	(Egypt) Bassem Amin	2617	1 (W 144)	0 (B 66)	1 (W 125)	½ (B 136)	1 (W 67)	1 (B 95)	½ (W 25)	1 (B 73)	1 (B 1)	½ (W 2)	1 (B 29)	1 (W 13)	0 (W 5)	0 (B 4)	0 (W 7)	1 (B 79)	0 (W 17)	1 (B 57)	0 (W 12)	0 (B 19)	1 (W 60)	12½	245½	254	2654
28	(Iran) Parham Maghsoodloo	2655	½ (B 153)	½ (W 34)	1 (B 165)	1 (W 135)	0 (B 147)	1 (W 60)	1 (B 119)	0 (W 78)	1 (B 62)	1 (W 1)	1 (B 21)	1 (W 2)	0 (B 12)	1 (W 20)	0 (B 24)	1 (W 3)	0 (W 9)	0 (B 8)	0 (W 32)	1 (B 48)	(W 35)	12½	242½	250	2622
29	(Germany) Rasmus Svane	2643	1 (B 137)	1 (W 165)	1 (B 123)	1 (w 132)	0 (B 14)	1 (W 147)	0 (W 13)	½ (B 25)	1 (W 7)	1 (B 39)	0 (W 27)	0 (B 8)	0 (B 100)	½ (W 78)	1 (B 51)	1 (W 44)	1 (B 15)	1 (W 66)	0 (B 6)	0 (W 10)	½ (B 26)	12½	236½	244	2589
30	(Egypt) Ahmed Adly	2656	1 (W 124)	0 (B 80)	1 (W 74)	0 (B 68)	1 (W 69)	1 (B 81)	1 (W 83)	½ (B 102)	1 (W 132)	½ (W 66)	0 (B 14)	0 (W 3)	0 (B 44)	0 (W 15)	1 (B 108)	1 (B 47)	1 (W 40)	1 (B 26)	½ (W 35)	½ (B 42)	½ (W 37)	12½	232½	241½	2569
31	(Bulgaria) Ivan Cheparinov	2594	1 (B 169)	½ (W 173)	0 (B 1)	½ (W 133)	½ (B 89)	1 (W 120)	1 (B 101)	½ (W 56)	½ (W 16)	0 (B 75)	1 (W 134)	1 (B 46)	1 (W 19)	0 (B 8)	½ (W 32)	½ (B 52)	½ (W 22)	1 (B 55)	0 (W 20)	1 (W 67)	½ (B 33)	12½	231½	239	2581
32	(India) Gukesh D	2506	0 (B 17)	1 (W 177)	0 (W 106)	1 (B 77)	0 (W 61)	0 (B 43)	0 (W 160)	1 (B 167)	1 (B 65)	1 (W 93)	½ (B 55)	1 (W 143)	1 (B 48)	1 (W 36)	½ (B 31)	1 (W 21)	0 (B 10)	1 (W 37)	1 (B 28)	½ (W 20)	0 (B 15)	12½	229½	232½	2621
33	(Israel) Boris Gelfand	2647	½ (W 105)	½ (B 126)	1 (W 127)	½ (B 80)	½ (W 102)	1 (B 136)	1 (W 37)	0 (B 12)	½ (W 104)	½ (B 132)	1 (W 47)	1 (B 39)	0 (W 1)	0 (B 10)	0 (W 42)	1 (B 85)	1 (W 67)	1 (B 81)	½ (W 44)	(B 35)	½ (W 31)	12½	228	236½	2587
34	(Germany) Alexander Donchenko	2494	½ (W 23)	½ (B 28)	½ (W 61)	½ (B 47)	1 (W 106)	0 (B 54)	1 (W 77)	1 (W 36)	0 (B 56)	½ (B 83)	½ (W 84)	½ (B 50)	0 (W 71)	1 (B 121)	1 (W 76)	0 (W 64)	0 (B 59)	1 (B 145)	1 (W 110)	1 (B 57)	1 (W 52)	12½	226	234½	2633
35	(Armenia) Shant Sargsyan	2537	0 (B 6)	0 (W 156)	1 (B 118)	1 (W 130)	0 (B 93)	½ (W 107)	0 (B 55)	1 (W 128)	½ (B 76)	1 (W 152)	1 (B 147)	0 (W 36)	1 (B 144)	1 (W 59)	1 (B 41)	1 (W 43)	1 (B 20)	0 (W 14)	½ (B 30)	½ (W 33)	½ (B 28)	12½	223	231½	2566
36	(United Arab Emirates) Salem Saleh	2642	0 (W 8)	1 (B 148)	½ (W 82)	½ (B 81)	1 (W 40)	1 (B 122)	0 (W 102)	0 (B 34)	1 (W 124)	1 (W 69)	0 (B 26)	1 (B 35)	½ (W 78)	0 (B 32)	½ (W 67)	1 (W 103)	0 (B 44)	1 (B 132)	1 (W 99)	1 (W 50)	½ (B 25)	12½	223	231½	2531
37	(Serbia) Aleksandar Inđić	2603	1 (W 118)	1 (B 141)	0 (W 12)	0 (B 147)	1 (W 127)	1 (W 3)	0 (B 33)	½ (B 144)	0 (W 75)	1 (B 149)	½ (W 67)	1 (B 102)	1 (W 73)	½ (B 101)	0 (W 79)	½ (B 19)	1 (W 46)	0 (B 32)	1 (W 74)	1 (W 66)	½ (B 30)	12½	222	230½	2569
38	(United States) Hans Niemann	2680	0 (B 165)	1 (W 149)	½ (B 45)	1 (W 103)	1 (B 62)	0 (W 10)	1 (B 80)	½ (W 68)	1 (B 48)	1 (W 54)	0 (B 24)	0 (W 26)	0 (B 42)	½ (W 104)	0 (B 99)	1 (W 109)	0 (B 91)	1 (W 88)	1 (B 90)	1 (W 86)	1 (B 51)	12½	221	228½	2572
39	(United States) Fabiano Caruana	2803	½ (B 135)	½ (W 60)	0 (B 112)	1 (W 88)	½ (B 111)	1 (W 96)	1 (B 174)	1 (W 143)	1 (B 10)	0 (W 29)	½ (B 52)	0 (W 33)	0 (B 41)	½ (W 62)	1 (B 68)	0 (W 83)	½ (B 99)	½ (W 86)	1 (B 80)	1 (W 91)	1 (B 44)	12½	218½	227	2578
40	(FIDE) Vladislav Kovalev	2527	0 (B 19)	1 (W 157)	0 (B 21)	1 (W 177)	0 (B 36)	½ (W 55)	0 (B 57)	½ (B 115)	0 (W 122)	1 (W 167)	0 (B 152)	1 (B 169)	1 (W 155)	1 (W 89)	1 (B 93)	1 (W 87)	0 (B 30)	½ (W 59)	1 (B 61)	1 (W 83)	1 (B 53)	12½	209½	212½	2529
41	Maxim Matlakov	2614	1 (W 49)	½ (B 8)	1 (W 72)	½ (B 16)	½ (W 4)	0 (B 5)	1 (W 95)	0 (B 7)	½ (W 146)	1 (B 89)	0 (B 1)	1 (W 108)	1 (W 39)	0 (B 26)	0 (W 35)	0 (B 67)	1 (W 75)	1 (B 78)	1 (W 81)	1 (W 68)	0 (B 21)	12	242½	251	2596
42	(Armenia) Tigran L. Petrosian	2602	1 (B 167)	0 (W 101)	1 (B 144)	½ (W 2)	1 (B 82)	0 (W 24)	1 (B 173)	0 (W 21)	0 (W 46)	1 (B 72)	1 (B 133)	½ (W 15)	1 (W 38)	0 (B 43)	1 (B 33)	1 (W 70)	1 (B 45)	½ (W 6)	0 (B 9)	½ (W 30)	0 (W 23)	12	237	244	2599
43	(Ukraine) Volodymyr Onyshchuk	2657	1 (B 100)	0 (W 114)	0 (B 119)	1 (W 108)	0 (B 159)	1 (W 32)	1 (B 44)	1 (W 88)	1 (B 68)	0 (W 142)	0 (B 10)	1 (W 86)	1 (B 15)	1 (W 42)	0 (W 3)	0 (B 35)	1 (W 78)	1 (B 50)	0 (W 13)	1 (W 51)	0 (B 18)	12	236	244	2583
44	Volodar Murzin	2481	1 (W 94)	0 (B 22)	0 (W 58)	0 (B 54)	1 (W 176)	1 (B 106)	0 (W 43)	1 (B 151)	½ (W 71)	1 (B 129)	½ (W 83)	1 (B 47)	1 (W 30)	0 (B 18)	1 (W 84)	0 (B 29)	1 (W 36)	1 (B 77)	½ (B 33)	½ (W 21)	0 (W 39)	12	229½	233	2642
45	(Netherlands) Jorden van Foreest	2566	1 (W 130)	0 (B 46)	½ (W 38)	1 (B 146)	0 (W 71)	1 (B 113)	0 (W 23)	1 (W 107)	0 (B 17)	1 (B 150)	1 (W 22)	1 (B 145)	1 (W 21)	0 (W 9)	1 (B 83)	½ (B 50)	0 (W 42)	0 (B 19)	0 (W 47)	1 (B 94)	1 (W 77)	12	228	236½	2598
46	(Uzbekistan) Nodirbek Abdusattorov	2686	1 (B 88)	1 (W 45)	0 (B 132)	0 (W 99)	1 (B 135)	½ (W 68)	1 (B 51)	0 (W 10)	1 (B 42)	1 (W 104)	0 (B 3)	0 (W 31)	½ (B 62)	1 (W 69)	1 (B 78)	0 (W 66)	0 (B 37)	1 (W 103)	0 (B 26)	1 (W 100)	1 (B 67)	12	227	236	2569
47	(Uzbekistan) Shamsiddin Vokhidov	2613	1 (B 162)	0 (W 123)	½ (B 133)	½ (W 34)	1 (B 144)	1 (W 100)	½ (B 142)	0 (W 19)	1 (B 82)	½ (W 59)	0 (B 33)	0 (W 44)	1 (B 108)	1 (W 55)	0 (B 15)	0 (W 30)	1 (B 98)	1 (W 69)	1 (B 45)	0 (W 26)	1 (B 66)	12	226½	234½	2565
48	Sanan Sjugirov	2589	1 (W 128)	0 (B 12)	1 (W 113)	0 (B 25)	1 (W 105)	0 (B 73)	1 (W 137)	1 (B 150)	0 (W 38)	1 (B 146)	0 (W 19)	½ (B 67)	0 (W 32)	1 (B 131)	1 (W 132)	1 (B 23)	½ (W 71)	0 (B 22)	1 (W 63)	0 (W 28)	1 (B 69)	12	223	231½	2571
49	(Azerbaijan) Vugar Asadli	2386	0 (B 41)	0 (B 71)	1 (W 160)	1 (W 90)	½ (B 112)	1 (W 110)	0 (B 143)	1 (W 76)	1 (W 87)	1 (B 70)	0 (W 11)	½ (B 85)	½ (W 84)	1 (B 22)	1 (W 75)	0 (B 17)	0 (B 57)	1 (W 64)	0 (W 52)	½ (B 63)	1 (B 68)	12	223	231	2641
50	(Greece) Dimitrios Mastrovasilis	2577	1 (B 156)	½ (W 19)	0 (B 17)	1 (W 163)	0 (B 24)	½ (W 89)	0 (B 133)	1 (W 137)	1 (B 173)	0 (W 3)	1 (B 127)	½ (W 34)	1 (B 119)	1 (W 145)	1 (B 100)	½ (W 45)	0 (B 12)	0 (W 43)	1 (W 55)	0 (B 36)	1 (W 74)	12	222	230	2573
51	(Spain) Jaime Santos Latasa	2561	1 (B 177)	1 (W 52)	½ (B 9)	0 (W 6)	½ (B 19)	½ (W 56)	0 (W 46)	1 (B 55)	½ (W 18)	½ (B 106)	0 (W 71)	½ (B 72)	1 (W 102)	1 (B 73)	0 (W 29)	1 (B 75)	(B 21)	1 (W 82)	1 (W 57)	0 (B 43)	0 (W 38)	11½	236	239	2646
52	Sergey Karjakin	2657	1 (W 116)	0 (B 51)	0 (W 136)	1 (B 124)	0 (W 121)	1 (B 127)	½ (W 67)	1 (B 103)	1 (W 72)	1 (B 79)	½ (W 39)	1 (B 78)	1 (B 3)	0 (W 6)	0 (B 2)	½ (W 31)	0 (B 83)	1 (W 100)	1 (B 49)	0 (W 15)	0 (B 34)	11½	230½	239	2581
53	(United States) Andrew Tang	2588	½ (B 152)	1 (W 89)	0 (B 24)	1 (W 115)	0 (B 2)	1 (W 163)	0 (W 7)	1 (B 95)	1 (W 22)	0 (B 11)	0 (W 145)	1 (B 149)	1 (W 131)	1 (B 19)	1 (W 101)	½ (B 81)	0 (W 8)	½ (B 18)	0 (W 23)	1 (B 79)	0 (W 40)	11½	229	237	2555
54	Alexandr Predke	2627	1 (B 164)	0 (W 132)	0 (B 100)	1 (W 44)	1 (B 123)	1 (W 34)	0 (W 12)	1 (B 124)	1 (W 3)	0 (B 38)	1 (W 131)	½ (B 21)	0 (B 6)	0 (W 70)	1 (B 90)	0 (W 57)	0 (W 74)	0 (B 120)	1 (W 119)	1 (B 105)	1 (W 79)	11½	223	231	2576
55	(Georgia (country)) Baadur Jobava	2689	0 (W 67)	1 (B 122)	0 (W 102)	0 (B 127)	1 (W 125)	½ (B 40)	1 (W 35)	0 (W 51)	½ (B 81)	1 (B 74)	½ (W 32)	½ (B 131)	1 (W 120)	0 (B 47)	1 (W 118)	1 (B 101)	1 (W 84)	0 (W 31)	0 (B 50)	1 (W 76)	(B 62)	11½	218	227	2525
56	Vadim Zvjaginsev	2634	1 (W 122)	1 (B 81)	0 (W 66)	½ (B 102)	½ (W 136)	½ (B 51)	1 (W 72)	½ (B 31)	1 (W 34)	0 (B 25)	1 (W 132)	0 (B 1)	0 (W 79)	½ (B 74)	½ (W 88)	0 (W 69)	0 (B 108)	1 (B 139)	1 (W 131)	½ (B 84)	1 (W 85)	11½	216	224½	2548
57	(Armenia) Manuel Petrosyan	2643	½ (W 126)	0 (B 105)	0 (W 15)	½ (B 148)	1 (W 167)	½ (B 134)	1 (W 40)	1 (B 67)	½ (W 144)	1 (B 135)	½ (W 68)	½ (B 79)	0 (W 85)	½ (B 88)	1 (W 80)	1 (B 54)	1 (W 49)	0 (W 27)	0 (B 51)	0 (W 34)	1 (B 86)	11½	215	222	2522
58	(Armenia) Sergei Movsesian	2615	1 (B 140)	0 (W 131)	1 (B 44)	½ (W 100)	1 (B 96)	1 (W 101)	½ (B 24)	½ (W 20)	0 (B 14)	0 (W 17)	0 (B 104)	½ (W 133)	0 (B 88)	0 (W 108)	1 (B 123)	1 (W 144)	0 (B 86)	1 (W 122)	½ (B 103)	1 (W 82)	1 (B 90)	11½	212	220½	2528
59	(Armenia) Gabriel Sargissian	2661	0 (W 66)	0 (B 133)	½ (W 148)	½ (B 166)	1 (W 162)	1 (B 74)	1 (W 146)	1 (B 119)	½ (W 79)	½ (B 47)	½ (W 85)	½ (B 104)	0 (W 10)	0 (B 35)	1 (W 102)	0 (B 78)	1 (W 34)	½ (B 40)	1 (W 108)	0 (B 60)	1 (W 84)	11½	212	219½	2517
60	Evgeniy Najer	2551	½ (W 7)	½ (B 39)	1 (W 77)	0 (B 145)	1 (W 63)	0 (B 28)	0 (W 144)	1 (B 122)	0 (W 89)	½ (B 105)	0 (W 72)	0 (B 139)	1 (W 154)	1 (B 148)	1 (W 92)	0 (B 132)	1 (W 125)	1 (W 93)	1 (B 82)	1 (W 59)	0 (B 27)	11½	211	219½	2547
61	Artyom Timofeev	2628	0 (B 123)	1 (W 162)	½ (B 34)	½ (W 111)	1 (B 32)	1 (W 159)	1 (B 147)	0 (W 1)	½ (W 100)	0 (B 16)	0 (W 79)	1 (B 134)	0 (W 81)	0 (B 67)	0 (W 105)	1 (B 150)	1 (W 116)	1 (B 119)	0 (W 40)	1 (B 108)	1 (W 80)	11½	211	219	2522
62	(Georgia (country)) Merab Gagunashvili	2575	0 (W 141)	½ (B 155)	1 (W 116)	1 (B 150)	0 (W 38)	(B 92)	1 (W 122)	1 (B 152)	0 (W 28)	½ (B 145)	½ (W 106)	½ (B 132)	½ (W 46)	½ (B 39)	0 (W 19)	½ (B 131)	1 (W 73)	0 (B 63)	1 (W 72)	1 (B 81)	(W 55)	11½	209½	218	2557
63	(Iran) Ehsan Ghaem Maghami	2720	0 (B 111)	0 (W 100)	1 (B 140)	1 (W 165)	0 (B 60)	1 (W 90)	0 (B 88)	1 (W 101)	0 (B 69)	0 (W 127)	1 (B 153)	½ (W 82)	0 (B 134)	½ (W 123)	1 (B 137)	1 (W 102)	1 (B 97)	1 (W 62)	0 (B 48)	½ (W 49)	1 (B 83)	11½	205	212½	2510
64	(Argentina) Alan Pichot	2629	0 (W 72)	1 (B 154)	½ (W 126)	0 (B 82)	1 (W 128)	½ (B 67)	1 (W 105)	0 (B 100)	½ (W 149)	0 (B 134)	1 (W 146)	0 (B 81)	1 (W 125)	1 (B 111)	1 (W 74)	1 (B 34)	0 (W 79)	0 (B 49)	½ (B 104)	½ (W 88)	1 (B 91)	11½	204½	213	2482
65	(Ukraine) Zahar Efimenko	2601	½ (W 166)	½ (B 125)	½ (W 95)	1 (B 126)	0 (W 72)	0 (W 82)	½ (B 120)	0 (B 105)	0 (W 32)	1 (B 154)	½ (W 122)	½ (B 148)	½ (W 153)	0 (B 92)	1 (W 128)	½ (B 139)	1 (W 137)	½ (B 118)	1 (W 133)	1 (B 89)	1 (W 93)	11½	196	203½	2433
66	(Turkey) Vahap Şanal	2499	1 (B 59)	1 (W 27)	1 (B 56)	½ (W 20)	0 (B 25)	0 (W 18)	1 (W 71)	1 (B 84)	1 (W 73)	½ (B 30)	0 (W 12)	½ (B 75)	1 (W 23)	0 (B 17)	1 (W 106)	1 (B 46)	½ (W 14)	0 (B 29)	0 (W 22)	0 (B 37)	0 (W 47)	11	245	255	2678
67	Alexander Riazantsev	2520	1 (B 55)	½ (W 18)	1 (B 98)	0 (W 9)	0 (B 27)	½ (W 64)	½ (B 52)	0 (W 57)	1 (B 174)	1 (W 87)	½ (B 37)	½ (W 48)	0 (B 70)	1 (W 61)	½ (B 36)	1 (W 41)	0 (B 33)	1 (W 76)	1 (W 71)	0 (B 31)	0 (W 46)	11	236½	245	2638
68	(India) Harsha Bharathakoti	2576	1 (B 157)	0 (W 9)	1 (B 130)	1 (W 30)	0 (W 11)	½ (B 46)	1 (W 75)	½ (B 38)	0 (W 43)	1 (B 73)	½ (B 57)	0 (W 17)	1 (W 107)	0 (B 23)	0 (W 39)	1 (B 105)	1 (W 101)	½ (B 74)	1 (W 77)	0 (B 41)	0 (W 49)	11	233	241½	2617
69	(Poland) Paweł Czarnota	2540	½ (B 24)	0 (W 142)	½ (B 3)	1 (W 156)	0 (B 30)	0 (W 144)	1 (W 154)	1 (B 157)	1 (W 63)	0 (B 36)	1 (W 115)	0 (B 84)	1 (W 72)	0 (B 46)	1 (W 151)	1 (B 56)	0 (W 77)	0 (B 47)	1 (W 73)	1 (B 71)	0 (W 48)	11	223½	232	2600
70	(Ukraine) Anton Korobov	2710	½ (W 102)	1 (B 15)	0 (W 10)	1 (B 91)	½ (W 86)	½ (B 174)	½ (W 79)	0 (B 104)	1 (W 121)	0 (W 49)	(B 81)	1 (B 111)	1 (W 67)	1 (B 54)	½ (W 26)	0 (B 42)	0 (W 18)	0 (B 99)	1 (W 78)	0 (B 74)	1 (W 114)	11	221½	230	2560
71	(Armenia) Robert Hovhannisyan	2633	0 (B 131)	1 (W 49)	1 (B 108)	½ (W 114)	1 (B 45)	0 (W 132)	0 (B 66)	½ (W 123)	½ (B 44)	1 (W 82)	1 (B 51)	0 (W 101)	1 (B 34)	0 (W 81)	1 (B 119)	1 (W 91)	½ (B 48)	0 (W 15)	0 (B 67)	0 (W 69)	1 (B 88)	11	218	227	2508
72	(Poland) Paweł Teclaf	2431	1 (B 64)	½ (W 76)	0 (B 41)	1 (W 178)	1 (B 65)	0 (W 20)	0 (B 56)	1 (W 110)	0 (B 52)	0 (W 42)	1 (B 60)	½ (W 51)	0 (B 69)	0 (W 135)	1 (B 124)	0 (W 98)	1 (B 102)	1 (W 143)	0 (B 62)	1 (W 117)	1 (B 99)	11	218	226½	2595
73	(Ukraine) Kirill Shevchenko	2697	1 (B 159)	1 (W 26)	1 (B 114)	0 (W 78)	0 (B 99)	1 (W 48)	1 (B 86)	0 (W 27)	0 (B 66)	0 (W 68)	1 (B 88)	1 (W 135)	0 (B 37)	0 (W 51)	0 (B 103)	1 (W 134)	0 (B 62)	1 (W 117)	0 (B 69)	1 (W 101)	1 (B 104)	11	215	223	2556
74	(Hungary) Gergely Kantor	2517	0 (B 21)	1 (W 171)	0 (B 30)	0 (W 3)	1 (B 156)	0 (W 59)	1 (B 166)	0 (B 106)	1 (W 157)	0 (W 55)	1 (B 172)	1 (W 147)	1 (B 135)	½ (W 56)	0 (B 64)	1 (W 143)	1 (B 54)	½ (W 68)	0 (B 37)	1 (W 70)	0 (B 50)	11	211½	217	2547
75	(Hungary) Richárd Rapport	2754	½ (B 119)	1 (W 134)	0 (B 173)	1 (W 123)	0 (B 143)	1 (W 111)	0 (B 68)	1 (W 117)	1 (B 37)	1 (W 31)	0 (B 100)	½ (W 66)	0 (B 83)	1 (W 86)	0 (B 49)	0 (W 51)	0 (B 41)	1 (W 89)	0 (B 88)	1 (W 132)	1 (B 103)	11	210½	219	2528
76	(Germany) Matthias Blübaum	2609	1 (W 154)	½ (B 72)	0 (W 8)	½ (B 105)	0 (W 81)	½ (B 126)	1 (W 114)	0 (B 49)	½ (W 35)	0 (B 108)	1 (B 137)	½ (W 124)	1 (B 140)	1 (W 134)	0 (B 34)	1 (W 104)	½ (W 132)	0 (B 67)	1 (W 92)	0 (B 55)	1 (W 110)	11	209½	218½	2492
77	(Spain) David Antón Guijarro	2668	½ (B 134)	½ (W 119)	0 (B 60)	0 (W 32)	1 (B 154)	1 (W 165)	0 (B 34)	0 (W 90)	0 (B 127)	½ (W 92)	1 (B 156)	1 (W 123)	1 (B 89)	½ (W 82)	1 (B 135)	1 (W 86)	1 (B 69)	0 (W 44)	0 (B 68)	1 (W 99)	0 (B 45)	11	209	216½	2501
78	(Poland) Bartosz Soćko	2571	1 (B 179)	1 (W 21)	1 (W 11)	1 (B 73)	1 (W 12)	0 (B 6)	0 (W 8)	1 (B 28)	½ (B 24)	½ (W 14)	0 (B 2)	0 (W 52)	½ (B 36)	½ (B 29)	0 (W 46)	1 (W 59)	0 (B 43)	0 (W 41)	0 (B 70)	½ (W 107)	1 (B 100)	10½	247	253	2682
79	(Armenia) Samvel Ter-Sahakyan	2565	1 (B 175)	½ (W 17)	1 (B 19)	1 (W 24)	0 (B 9)	0 (W 2)	(B 70)	1 (W 147)	½ (B 59)	0 (W 52)	1 (B 61)	½ (W 57)	1 (B 56)	½ (W 83)	1 (B 37)	0 (W 27)	1 (B 64)	0 (W 10)	0 (B 18)	0 (W 53)	0 (B 54)	10½	240½	245	2626
80	(United States) Timur Gareyev	2548	1 (B 3)	1 (W 30)	0 (B 20)	½ (W 33)	0 (B 21)	1 (W 17)	0 (W 38)	½ (B 94)	½ (W 150)	0 (B 22)	1 (W 139)	0 (B 107)	1 (W 148)	1 (B 95)	0 (B 57)	1 (W 119)	1 (W 145)	0 (B 23)	0 (W 39)	1 (B 120)	0 (B 61)	10½	229	237½	2616
81	(Poland) Kacper Piorun	2535	1 (B 4)	0 (W 56)	½ (B 107)	½ (W 36)	1 (B 76)	0 (W 30)	0 (B 152)	½ (B 160)	½ (W 55)	1 (B 148)	½ (W 70)	1 (W 64)	1 (B 61)	1 (B 71)	1 (W 23)	½ (W 53)	0 (B 6)	0 (W 33)	0 (B 41)	0 (W 62)	½ (B 97)	10½	226	234	2620
82	(Kosovo) Nderim Saraçi	2479	1 (B 93)	0 (W 87)	½ (B 36)	1 (W 64)	0 (W 42)	1 (B 65)	1 (W 85)	0 (B 3)	0 (W 47)	0 (B 71)	1 (W 150)	½ (B 63)	½ (W 94)	½ (B 77)	1 (W 112)	½ (B 107)	1 (W 106)	0 (B 51)	0 (W 60)	0 (B 58)	1 (W 121)	10½	224	232½	2633
83	(Czech Republic) Peter Michalik	2605	½ (B 139)	0 (W 120)	1 (B 153)	1 (W 137)	½ (B 100)	1 (W 133)	0 (B 30)	1 (W 89)	0 (B 142)	½ (W 34)	½ (B 44)	1 (W 144)	1 (W 75)	½ (B 79)	0 (W 45)	1 (B 39)	1 (W 52)	0 (B 20)	0 (W 21)	0 (B 40)	0 (W 63)	10½	223	231½	2577
84	(India) Pentala Harikrishna	2614	0 (B 101)	1 (W 118)	½ (B 137)	1 (W 134)	1 (B 114)	½ (W 142)	½ (B 19)	0 (W 66)	½ (B 133)	½ (W 119)	½ (B 34)	1 (W 69)	½ (B 49)	(W 21)	0 (B 44)	1 (W 88)	0 (B 55)	½ (W 108)	½ (B 100)	½ (W 56)	0 (B 59)	10½	220	229	2550
85	(Azerbaijan) Vasif Durarbayli	2599	½ (B 89)	1 (W 152)	0 (B 142)	1 (W 120)	0 (B 101)	1 (W 115)	0 (B 82)	½ (W 173)	1 (B 123)	1 (W 147)	½ (B 59)	½ (W 49)	1 (B 57)	0 (W 2)	0 (B 21)	0 (W 33)	½ (B 87)	0 (W 90)	1 (B 113)	1 (W 104)	0 (B 56)	10½	218½	227	2520
86	(India) Raunak Sadhwani	2562	0 (W 147)	½ (B 92)	1 (W 166)	1 (W 107)	½ (B 70)	1 (B 145)	0 (W 73)	0 (B 16)	1 (W 105)	1 (B 94)	0 (W 23)	0 (B 43)	1 (W 132)	0 (B 75)	1 (W 120)	0 (B 77)	1 (W 58)	½ (B 39)	1 (W 101)	0 (B 38)	0 (W 57)	10½	217	224½	2611
87	Klementy Sychev	2615	1 (W 148)	1 (B 82)	1 (W 147)	0 (B 12)	½ (W 142)	½ (B 16)	0 (W 1)	½ (W 133)	0 (B 49)	0 (B 67)	½ (W 105)	0 (B 120)	1 (W 127)	1 (B 149)	1 (W 150)	0 (B 40)	½ (W 85)	0 (B 101)	½ (W 114)	½ (B 116)	1 (W 126)	10½	214½	223	2537
88	(Poland) Marcin Tazbir	2518	0 (W 46)	0 (B 146)	1 (W 157)	0 (B 39)	1 (W 169)	1 (B 160)	1 (W 63)	0 (B 43)	0 (W 94)	1 (B 151)	0 (W 73)	1 (B 115)	1 (W 58)	½ (W 57)	½ (B 56)	0 (B 84)	1 (W 107)	0 (B 38)	1 (W 75)	½ (B 64)	0 (W 71)	10½	214	221½	2617
89	(India) Guha Mitrabha	2370	½ (W 85)	0 (B 53)	1 (W 129)	½ (B 151)	½ (W 31)	½ (B 50)	1 (W 121)	0 (B 83)	1 (B 60)	0 (W 41)	0 (B 103)	1 (W 97)	0 (W 77)	0 (B 40)	1 (W 114)	½ (B 112)	1 (W 111)	0 (B 75)	1 (B 135)	0 (W 65)	1 (B 138)	10½	213½	222	2587
90	(Uzbekistan) Jakhongir Vakhidov	2534	0 (W 5)	0 (B 150)	1 (W 167)	0 (B 49)	1 (W 166)	0 (B 63)	1 (W 118)	1 (B 77)	0 (W 145)	1 (B 113)	½ (W 107)	0 (B 22)	1 (W 146)	1 (B 94)	0 (W 54)	1 (B 121)	0 (W 23)	1 (B 85)	0 (W 38)	1 (B 106)	0 (W 58)	10½	213½	220½	2565
91	(United States) Fidel Corrales Jimenez	2555	0 (W 12)	½ (B 128)	1 (W 155)	0 (W 70)	0 (B 115)	1 (B 141)	1 (W 113)	0 (W 17)	0 (B 101)	1 (B 136)	1 (W 125)	1 (B 95)	0 (W 106)	1 (B 139)	1 (W 145)	0 (B 71)	1 (W 38)	0 (B 21)	1 (W 120)	0 (B 39)	0 (W 64)	10½	212	220½	2542
92	(Greece) Nikolas Theodorou	2351	0 (B 110)	½ (W 86)	1 (B 109)	1 (W 138)	0 (B 3)	½ (W 62)	0 (B 104)	0 (B 121)	½ (W 136)	½ (B 77)	1 (W 151)	½ (B 112)	0 (W 111)	1 (W 65)	0 (B 60)	½ (W 159)	1 (B 124)	1 (W 97)	0 (B 76)	1 (B 145)	½ (W 94)	10½	206½	214½	2591
93	(Norway) Aryan Tari	2656	0 (W 82)	0 (B 144)	1 (W 162)	1 (B 125)	1 (W 35)	0 (B 102)	0 (W 124)	1 (B 136)	0 (W 119)	0 (B 32)	1 (W 116)	½ (B 105)	½ (W 149)	1 (B 114)	0 (W 40)	½ (B 120)	1 (W 131)	0 (B 60)	1 (W 126)	1 (B 121)	0 (B 65)	10½	202½	210½	2498
94	David Paravyan	2656	0 (B 44)	1 (W 164)	½ (B 111)	0 (W 96)	½ (B 137)	1 (W 108)	½ (B 123)	½ (W 80)	1 (B 88)	0 (W 86)	0 (B 119)	1 (W 127)	½ (B 82)	0 (W 90)	½ (B 134)	1 (W 126)	0 (B 103)	1 (W 136)	1 (B 132)	0 (W 45)	(B 92)	10½	201	209	2505
95	(Poland) Jakub Kosakowski	2340	0 (B 138)	1 (W 104)	½ (B 65)	1 (W 117)	1 (B 110)	0 (W 27)	0 (B 41)	0 (W 53)	1 (B 109)	0 (W 143)	1 (B 114)	0 (W 91)	1 (B 159)	0 (W 80)	0 (B 98)	0 (B 116)	1 (W 148)	0 (W 135)	1 (B 165)	1 (W 119)	1 (B 129)	10½	200½	208	2565
96	(Egypt) Samy Shoker	2529	0 (W 11)	½ (B 113)	1 (W 169)	1 (B 94)	0 (W 58)	0 (B 39)	0 (B 17)	1 (W 163)	0 (B 107)	½ (W 117)	½ (B 140)	1 (W 173)	0 (W 150)	0 (B 146)	0 (W 148)	½ (B 115)	1 (W 162)	1 (B 137)	½ (B 98)	1 (W 147)	1 (W 125)	10½	198	205½	2474
97	(Spain) Alvar Alonso Rosell	2580	1 (W 150)	0 (B 14)	1 (W 158)	0 (B 4)	0 (W 122)	0 (B 137)	0 (W 148)	1 (B 162)	1 (W 116)	0 (B 124)	1 (W 169)	0 (B 89)	1 (W 126)	0 (B 120)	1 (W 149)	1 (B 118)	0 (W 63)	0 (B 92)	1 (W 134)	1 (B 131)	½ (W 81)	10½	197	204½	2475
98	(Poland) Mateusz Bartel	2638	½ (W 125)	1 (B 166)	0 (W 67)	0 (B 15)	½ (W 126)	0 (B 124)	0 (W 149)	0 (B 113)	0 (W 169)	1 (B 175)	1 (W 170)	½ (B 154)	½ (W 122)	1 (B 155)	1 (W 95)	1 (B 72)	0 (W 47)	0 (B 131)	½ (W 96)	1 (B 133)	1 (W 120)	10½	191½	196	2433
99	(Serbia) Velimir Ivić	2575	1 (W 146)	0 (B 11)	1 (W 176)	1 (B 46)	1 (W 73)	½ (W 25)	1 (B 21)	0 (B 2)	1 (W 19)	½ (W 24)	½ (B 6)	0 (B 7)	0 (W 17)	0 (B 106)	1 (W 38)	0 (B 22)	½ (W 39)	1 (W 70)	0 (B 36)	0 (B 77)	0 (W 72)	10	245½	249	2675
100	(Italy) Luca Moroni	2491	0 (W 43)	1 (B 63)	1 (W 54)	½ (B 58)	½ (W 83)	0 (B 47)	1 (W 145)	1 (W 64)	(B 61)	1 (B 23)	1 (W 75)	0 (B 16)	1 (W 29)	0 (B 3)	0 (W 50)	1 (B 106)	0 (W 19)	0 (B 52)	½ (W 84)	0 (B 46)	0 (W 78)	10	236½	245	2664
101	Ramil Faizrakhmanov	2396	1 (W 84)	1 (B 42)	½ (W 22)	0 (B 13)	1 (W 85)	0 (B 58)	0 (W 31)	0 (B 63)	1 (W 91)	1 (W 110)	1 (B 143)	1 (B 71)	½ (W 18)	½ (W 37)	0 (B 53)	0 (W 55)	0 (B 68)	1 (W 87)	0 (B 86)	0 (B 73)	½ (W 112)	10	228	236½	2618
102	(Italy) Danyyil Dvirnyy	2531	½ (B 70)	½ (W 107)	1 (B 55)	½ (W 56)	½ (B 33)	1 (W 93)	1 (B 36)	½ (W 30)	½ (B 21)	0 (W 20)	0 (B 18)	0 (W 37)	0 (B 51)	1 (W 144)	0 (B 59)	0 (B 63)	0 (W 72)	0 (W 147)	1 (B 167)	1 (W 140)	1 (B 139)	10	224	231	2594
103	(Croatia) Ivan Šarić	2543	½ (W 16)	0 (B 25)	1 (W 128)	0 (B 38)	0 (B 7)	1 (W 139)	1 (B 163)	0 (W 52)	½ (W 113)	1 (B 122)	1 (W 89)	½ (B 106)	0 (W 22)	½ (B 150)	1 (W 73)	0 (B 36)	1 (W 94)	0 (B 46)	½ (W 58)	(B 110)	0 (W 65)	10	222	230	2591
104	(Poland) Grzegorz Gajewski	2539	0 (W 14)	0 (B 95)	1 (W 154)	0 (B 122)	1 (W 148)	1 (B 172)	1 (W 92)	1 (W 70)	½ (B 33)	0 (B 46)	1 (W 58)	½ (W 59)	0 (B 145)	½ (B 38)	0 (W 22)	0 (B 76)	1 (W 112)	1 (B 106)	(W 64)	0 (B 85)	0 (W 73)	10	217½	223	2586
105	(Moldova) Victor Bologan	2472	½ (B 33)	1 (W 57)	0 (B 18)	½ (W 76)	0 (B 48)	1 (W 138)	0 (B 64)	1 (W 65)	0 (B 86)	½ (W 60)	½ (B 87)	(W 93)	0 (B 143)	1 (W 129)	1 (B 61)	0 (W 68)	0 (B 110)	1 (B 151)	1 (W 145)	0 (W 54)	(B 107)	10	215	223½	2617
106	(England) David Howell	2647	0 (B 132)	1 (W 140)	1 (B 32)	0 (W 119)	0 (B 34)	0 (W 44)	1 (B 108)	1 (W 74)	1 (B 120)	½ (W 51)	½ (B 62)	(W 103)	1 (B 91)	1 (W 99)	0 (B 66)	0 (W 100)	0 (B 82)	0 (W 104)	1 (B 125)	0 (W 90)	(B 116)	10	211	220	2512
107	(Poland) Radosław Wojtaszek	2730	½ (W 15)	½ (B 102)	½ (W 81)	0 (B 86)	½ (W 134)	(B 35)	1 (W 111)	0 (B 45)	1 (W 96)	½ (W 133)	½ (B 90)	1 (W 80)	0 (B 68)	0 (W 119)	1 (B 159)	½ (W 82)	0 (B 88)	(B 114)	½ (W 116)	½ (B 78)	½ (W 105)	10	210	218	2530
108	(Azerbaijan) Aydin Suleymanli	2506	0 (W 145)	1 (B 172)	0 (W 71)	0 (B 43)	1 (W 157)	0 (B 94)	0 (W 106)	1 (B 166)	1 (B 138)	1 (W 76)	1 (W 112)	0 (B 41)	0 (W 47)	1 (B 58)	0 (W 30)	1 (B 151)	1 (W 56)	½ (B 84)	0 (B 59)	0 (W 61)	(B 113)	10	209½	215	2578
109	Pavel Ponkratov	2546	½ (W 25)	0 (B 16)	0 (W 92)	1 (B 155)	1 (W 141)	0 (B 7)	1 (W 115)	0 (B 22)	0 (W 95)	0 (B 125)	1 (W 162)	1 (B 122)	0 (W 139)	1 (B 113)	1 (W 146)	0 (B 38)	0 (W 133)	0 (B 126)	1 (W 148)	½ (B 118)	1 (W 131)	10	206	214	2467
110	(Norway) Johan-Sebastian Christiansen	2593	1 (W 92)	1 (B 176)	½ (W 14)	0 (B 5)	0 (W 95)	0 (B 49)	1 (W 134)	0 (B 72)	1 (W 111)	0 (B 101)	0 (W 149)	0 (B 125)	1 (W 162)	1 (B 153)	0 (W 131)	1 (B 148)	1 (W 105)	1 (B 133)	0 (B 34)	½ (W 103)	0 (B 76)	10	205	208½	2478
111	Anton Demchenko	2531	1 (W 63)	0 (B 145)	½ (W 94)	½ (B 61)	½ (W 39)	0 (B 75)	0 (B 107)	1 (W 126)	0 (B 110)	1 (W 160)	1 (B 173)	0 (W 70)	1 (B 92)	0 (W 64)	0 (B 133)	1 (W 140)	0 (B 89)	0 (W 113)	1 (B 123)	½ (W 115)	1 (B 132)	10	204	212	2556
112	(India) S.L. Narayanan	2570	1 (B 171)	0 (W 20)	1 (W 39)	0 (B 11)	½ (W 49)	0 (B 146)	½ (B 128)	0 (W 120)	1 (B 140)	1 (W 123)	0 (B 108)	½ (W 92)	½ (B 124)	1 (W 133)	0 (B 82)	½ (W 89)	0 (B 104)	0 (W 125)	1 (B 152)	1 (W 122)	½ (B 101)	10	204	210½	2457
113	(Poland) Milosz Szpar	2285	0 (B 10)	½ (W 96)	0 (B 48)	1 (W 164)	1 (B 178)	0 (W 45)	0 (B 91)	1 (W 98)	½ (B 103)	0 (W 90)	0 (B 159)	½ (B 116)	1 (W 168)	0 (W 109)	1 (B 153)	0 (B 125)	1 (W 128)	1 (B 111)	0 (W 85)	1 (B 127)	½ (W 108)	10	202½	210	2536
114	(Netherlands) Lucas van Foreest	2521	1 (W 160)	1 (B 43)	0 (W 73)	½ (B 71)	0 (W 84)	0 (B 22)	0 (B 76)	½ (W 172)	1 (B 128)	½ (W 173)	0 (W 95)	½ (B 155)	1 (B 147)	0 (W 93)	0 (B 89)	1 (W 123)	1 (B 144)	½ (W 107)	½ (B 87)	1 (W 138)	0 (B 70)	10	202	207½	2532
115	(Azerbaijan) Khazar Babazada	2302	½ (W 151)	1 (B 129)	0 (W 23)	0 (B 53)	1 (W 91)	0 (B 85)	0 (B 109)	½ (W 40)	1 (B 165)	1 (W 174)	0 (B 69)	0 (W 88)	0 (B 136)	0 (W 117)	1 (B 168)	½ (W 96)	1 (B 140)	0 (W 121)	1 (B 159)	½ (B 111)	1 (W 134)	10	197½	205	2553
116	(Algeria) Bilel Bellahcene	2493	0 (B 52)	½ (W 3)	0 (B 62)	½ (W 152)	0 (B 172)	0 (W 166)	1 (B 171)	1 (W 155)	0 (B 97)	1 (W 128)	0 (B 93)	½ (W 113)	0 (B 123)	1 (W 163)	1 (B 162)	1 (W 95)	0 (B 61)	1 (W 146)	½ (B 107)	½ (W 87)	½ (W 106)	10	196	201½	2468
117	(Israel) Victor Mikhalevski	2577	1 (W 158)	0 (B 5)	½ (W 141)	0 (B 95)	0 (W 146)	1 (B 153)	1 (W 126)	0 (B 75)	0 (W 134)	½ (B 96)	0 (W 148)	1 (B 166)	0 (W 118)	1 (B 115)	0 (W 122)	1 (B 154)	1 (W 149)	0 (B 73)	1 (W 139)	0 (B 72)	1 (W 137)	10	194	201½	2451
118	(Ukraine) Vadym Petrovskyi	2377	0 (B 37)	0 (B 84)	0 (W 35)	0 (B 157)	1 (W 179)	1 (W 176)	0 (B 90)	0 (W 165)	1 (B 170)	0 (W 138)	1 (B 163)	1 (W 174)	1 (B 117)	1 (W 136)	0 (B 55)	0 (W 97)	1 (B 134)	½ (W 65)	0 (B 121)	½ (W 109)	1 (B 143)	10	189½	193	2508
119	(Kazakhstan) Rinat Jumabayev	2536	½ (W 75)	½ (B 77)	1 (W 43)	1 (B 106)	1 (W 145)	0 (B 11)	0 (W 28)	0 (W 59)	1 (B 93)	½ (B 84)	1 (W 94)	0 (B 23)	0 (W 50)	1 (B 107)	0 (W 71)	0 (B 80)	1 (W 121)	0 (W 61)	0 (B 54)	0 (B 95)	1 (W 148)	9½	221	229½	2634
120	(Poland) Maciej Klekowski	2444	½ (W 13)	1 (B 83)	0 (W 16)	0 (B 85)	1 (W 129)	0 (B 31)	½ (W 65)	1 (B 112)	0 (W 106)	0 (B 121)	1 (B 138)	1 (W 87)	0 (B 55)	1 (W 97)	0 (B 86)	½ (W 93)	1 (B 135)	1 (W 54)	0 (B 91)	0 (W 80)	0 (B 98)	9½	216	225	2611
121	Maksim Chigaev	2546	0 (B 2)	1 (W 169)	0 (B 4)	1 (W 149)	1 (B 52)	0 (W 19)	0 (B 89)	1 (W 92)	0 (B 70)	1 (W 120)	0 (B 144)	1 (W 152)	½ (B 133)	0 (W 34)	1 (B 140)	0 (W 90)	0 (B 119)	1 (B 115)	1 (W 118)	0 (W 93)	0 (B 82)	9½	212½	220	2511
122	(Czech Republic) Štěpán Žilka	2440	0 (B 56)	0 (W 55)	1 (B 171)	1 (W 104)	1 (B 97)	0 (W 36)	0 (B 62)	0 (W 60)	1 (B 40)	0 (W 103)	½ (B 65)	0 (W 109)	½ (B 98)	1 (W 138)	1 (B 117)	½ (W 135)	½ (B 143)	0 (B 58)	½ (W 151)	0 (B 112)	1 (W 154)	9½	208½	215	2566
123	(Norway) Kristian Stuvik Holm	2423	1 (W 61)	1 (B 47)	0 (W 29)	0 (B 75)	0 (W 54)	1 (B 151)	½ (W 94)	½ (B 71)	0 (W 85)	0 (B 112)	½ (W 129)	0 (B 77)	1 (W 116)	½ (B 63)	0 (W 58)	0 (B 114)	1 (W 161)	½ (B 160)	0 (W 111)	1 (B 157)	1 (W 145)	9½	207	215	2617
124	(Romania) Mihnea Costachi	2482	0 (B 30)	0 (W 4)	1 (B 179)	0 (W 52)	1 (B 177)	1 (W 98)	1 (B 93)	0 (W 54)	0 (B 36)	1 (W 97)	0 (W 135)	½ (B 76)	½ (W 112)	0 (B 151)	0 (W 72)	1 (B 166)	0 (W 92)	0 (B 138)	½ (W 154)	1 (B 158)	1 (W 146)	9½	202½	205½	2515
125	(Czech Republic) Thai Dai Van Nguyen	2446	½ (B 98)	½ (W 65)	0 (B 27)	0 (W 93)	0 (B 55)	1 (W 156)	0 (B 138)	1 (W 170)	½ (B 168)	1 (W 109)	0 (B 91)	1 (W 110)	0 (B 64)	0 (W 159)	1 (B 129)	1 (W 113)	0 (B 60)	1 (B 112)	0 (W 106)	1 (W 135)	0 (B 96)	9½	201½	208½	2562
126	(Romania) Mircea Pậrligras	2469	½ (B 57)	½ (W 33)	½ (B 64)	0 (W 65)	½ (B 98)	½ (W 76)	0 (B 117)	0 (B 111)	½ (W 163)	½ (W 156)	½ (B 174)	1 (W 138)	0 (B 97)	1 (W 152)	1 (B 136)	0 (B 94)	½ (W 151)	1 (W 109)	0 (B 93)	1 (W 143)	0 (B 87)	9½	200½	208½	2571
127	(Poland) Igor Janik	2516	0 (B 20)	1 (W 175)	0 (B 33)	1 (W 55)	0 (B 37)	0 (W 52)	½ (W 172)	½ (B 129)	1 (W 77)	1 (B 63)	0 (W 50)	0 (B 94)	0 (B 87)	0 (W 140)	½ (B 152)	0 (W 156)	1 (B 171)	1 (W 155)	1 (B 146)	0 (W 113)	1 (B 147)	9½	199	203½	2471
128	(Ukraine) Ihor Samunenkov	2348	0 (B 48)	½ (W 91)	0 (B 103)	1 (W 153)	0 (B 64)	1 (B 161)	½ (W 112)	0 (B 35)	0 (W 114)	0 (B 116)	½ (W 164)	0 (B 168)	1 (W 170)	1 (W 165)	0 (B 65)	1 (W 155)	0 (B 113)	1 (W 162)	½ (B 140)	½ (B 151)	1 (W 149)	9½	190	197	2503
129	(Greece) Stelios Halkias	2575	½ (B 163)	0 (W 115)	0 (B 89)	1 (W 139)	0 (B 120)	0 (W 152)	1 (B 164)	½ (W 127)	1 (B 137)	0 (W 44)	½ (B 123)	0 (W 140)	1 (B 173)	0 (B 105)	0 (w 125)	½ (W 153)	1 (B 167)	1 (W 144)	(B 147)	1 (B 149)	0 (W 95)	9½	185	192	2386
130	(Poland) Jonasz Baum	2157	0 (B 45)	1 (-)	0 (W 68)	0 (B 35)	0 (W 153)	0 (B 162)	0 (B 170)	1 (W 176)	0 (W 154)	0 (B 158)	1 (W 179)	1 (W 167)	0 (B 137)	½ (W 156)	0 (B 165)	1 (B 177)	1 (W 169)	0 (B 148)	1 (W 166)	1 (B 150)	1 (W 151)	9½	168	171	2356
131	(India) Abhimanyu Puranik	2437	1 (W 71)	1 (B 58)	1 (W 145)	½ (B 142)	1 (W 5)	0 (B 13)	1 (W 16)	0 (B 4)	½ (B 20)	0 (W 21)	0 (B 54)	½ (W 55)	0 (B 53)	0 (W 48)	1 (B 110)	½ (W 62)	0 (B 93)	1 (W 98)	0 (B 56)	0 (W 97)	0 (B 109)	9	238	246½	2661
132	(Bosnia and Herzegovina) Denis Kadrić	2469	1 (W 106)	1 (B 54)	1 (W 46)	0 (B 29)	½ (W 23)	1 (B 71)	½ (B 20)	½ (W 142)	0 (B 30)	½ (W 33)	0 (B 56)	½ (W 62)	0 (B 86)	1 (W 143)	0 (B 48)	1 (W 60)	½ (B 76)	0 (W 36)	0 (W 94)	0 (B 75)	0 (W 111)	9	233	241½	2646
133	(Austria) Felix Blohberger	2416	0 (B 18)	1 (W 59)	½ (W 47)	½ (B 31)	1 (W 151)	0 (B 83)	1 (W 50)	½ (B 87)	½ (W 84)	(B 107)	0 (W 42)	(B 58)	½ (W 121)	0 (B 112)	1 (W 111)	0 (B 145)	1 (B 109)	0 (W 110)	0 (B 65)	0 (W 98)	½ (B 135)	9	215	223½	2607
134	(Spain) Daniil Yuffa	2508	½ (W 77)	0 (B 75)	1 (W 7)	0 (B 84)	½ (B 107)	(W 57)	0 (B 110)	1 (W 161)	1 (B 117)	1 (W 64)	0 (B 31)	0 (W 61)	1 (W 63)	0 (B 76)	½ (W 94)	0 (B 73)	0 (W 118)	1 (B 150)	0 (B 97)	1 (W 160)	0 (B 115)	9	214½	222½	2623
135	(Ukraine) Andrei Volokitin	2547	½ (W 39)	1 (B 7)	½ (W 25)	0 (B 28)	0 (W 46)	0 (B 150)	1 (W 162)	1 (B 148)	1 (W 152)	0 (W 57)	1 (B 124)	0 (B 73)	0 (W 74)	1 (B 72)	0 (W 77)	½ (B 122)	0 (W 120)	1 (B 95)	0 (W 89)	0 (B 125)	½ (W 133)	9	212	220	2539
136	(Israel) Evgeny Postny	2521	0 (B 9)	1 (W 179)	1 (B 52)	½ (W 27)	½ (B 56)	0 (W 33)	0 (B 3)	0 (W 93)	½ (B 92)	0 (W 91)	½ (B 160)	1 (W 172)	1 (W 115)	0 (B 118)	0 (W 126)	1 (B 146)	1 (W 150)	0 (B 94)	0 (W 138)	0 (B 137)	1 (W 161)	9	207½	213½	2521
137	(Poland) Marcin Dziuba	2452	0 (W 29)	1 (B 160)	½ (W 84)	0 (B 83)	½ (W 94)	1 (W 97)	0 (B 48)	0 (B 50)	0 (W 129)	1 (B 163)	0 (W 76)	0 (B 151)	1 (W 130)	1 (B 166)	0 (W 63	1 (B 161)	0 (B 65)	0 (W 96)	1 (B 141)	1 (W 136)	0 (B 117)	9	201	208½	2553
138	Oleg Vastrukhin	2588	1 (W 95)	½ (W 1)	0 (B 6)	0 (B 92)	½ (W 150)	0 (B 105)	1 (W 125)	0 (B 149)	0 (W 108)	1 (B 118)	0 (W 120)	0 (B 126)	1 (W 169)	0 (B 122)	0 (W 166)	1 (B 170)	1 (W 156)	1 (W 124)	1 (B 136)	0 (B 114)	0 (W 89)	9	196½	203½	2457
139	(Poland) Grzegorz Nasuta	2377	½ (W 83)	0 (B 13)	0 (W 151)	0 (B 129)	1 (W 175)	0 (B 103)	0 (W 161)	1 (B 141)	1 (B 172)	1 (W 168)	0 (B 80)	1 (W 60)	1 (B 109)	0 (W 91)	0 (B 143)	½ (W 65)	1 (B 159)	0 (W 56)	0 (B 117)	1 (W 165)	0 (W 102)	9	191	195½	2533
140	(Austria) Valentin Dragnev	2396	0 (W 58)	0 (B 106)	0 (W 63)	0 (B 169)	1 (W 170)	1 (B 158)	0 (W 151)	1 (B 156)	0 (W 112)	1 (B 161)	½ (W 96)	1 (B 129)	0 (W 76)	1 (B 127)	0 (W 121)	0 (B 111)	0 (W 115)	1 (B 166)	½ (W 128)	0 (B 102)	1 (B 160)	9	188½	195½	2511
141	(India) Aditya Mittal	2245	1 (B 62)	0 (W 37)	½ (B 117)	0 (W 26)	0 (B 109)	0 (W 91)	0 (B 155)	0 (W 139)	1 (B 176)	0 (B 162)	0 (W 158)	1 (B 179)	1 (W 177)	½ (B 164)	0 (W 154)	0 (W 167)	1 (B 170)	1 (B 161)	0 (W 137)	1 (B 172)	1 (W 159)	9	172	175	2414
142	(United States) Hikaru Nakamura	2884	½ (W 161)	1 (B 69)	1 (W 85)	½ (W 131)	½ (B 87)	½ (B 84)	½ (W 47)	½ (B 132)	1 (W 83)	1 (B 43)	1 (W 8)	½ (W 14)	0 (B 4)	0 (-)	0 (-)	0 (-)	0 (-)	0 (-)	0 (-)	0 (-)	0 (-)	8½	225½	233½	2576
143	Mikhail Demidov	2592	1 (B 170)	1 (W 2)	½ (W 5)	0 (B 14)	1 (W 75)	0 (B 4)	1 (W 49)	0 (B 39)	0 (W 23)	1 (B 95)	0 (W 101)	0 (B 32)	1 (W 105)	0 (B 132)	1 (W 139)	0 (B 74)	½ (W 122)	0 (B 72)	½ (W 149)	0 (B 126)	0 (W 118)	8½	225½	232½	2545
144	(Ukraine) Li Min Peng	2412	0 (B 27)	1 (W 93)	0 (W 42)	1 (B 168)	0 (W 47)	1 (B 69)	1 (B 60)	½ (W 37)	½ (B 57)	0 (W 18)	1 (W 121)	0 (B 83)	0 (W 35)	0 (B 102)	1 (W 161)	0 (B 58)	0 (W 114)	0 (B 129)	0 (W 160)	1 (B 163)	½ (W 164)	8½	211½	219	2579
145	(Germany) Daniel Fridman	2663	1 (B 108)	1 (W 111)	0 (B 131)	1 (W 60)	0 (B 119)	0 (W 86)	0 (B 100)	1 (W 159)	1 (B 90)	½ (W 62)	1 (B 53)	0 (w 45)	1 (W 104)	0 (B 50)	0 (B 91)	1 (W 133)	0 (B 80)	0 (W 34)	0 (B 105)	0 (W 92)	0 (B 123)	8½	210½	218½	2521
146	(Denmark) Jesper Søndergaard Thybo	2195	0 (B 99)	1 (W 88)	½ (B 26)	0 (W 45)	1 (B 117)	1 (W 112)	0 (B 59)	1 (W 174)	½ (B 41)	0 (W 48)	0 (B 64)	½ (W 159)	0 (B 90)	1 (W 96)	0 (B 109)	0 (W 136)	1 (B 152)	0 (B 116)	0 (W 127)	1 (W 153)	0 (B 124)	8½	206	214	2554
147	(Poland) Jan Klimkowski	2015	1 (B 86)	1 (W 178)	0 (B 87)	1 (W 37)	1 (W 28)	0 (B 29)	0 (W 61)	0 (B 79)	1 (W 160)	0 (B 85)	0 (W 35)	0 (B 74)	0 (W 114)	0 (B 161)	1 (W 164)	0 (B 149)	1 (W 168)	1 (B 102)	½ (W 129)	0 (B 96)	0 (W 127)	8½	205½	213	2571
148	(Poland) Szymon Gumularz	2396	0 (B 87)	0 (W 36)	½ (B 59)	½ (W 57)	0 (B 104)	1 (W 171)	1 (B 97)	0 (W 135)	1 (B 159)	0 (W 81)	1 (B 117)	½ (W 65)	0 (B 80)	0 (W 60)	1 (B 96)	0 (W 110)	0 (B 95)	1 (W 130)	0 (B 109)	1 (W 152)	0 (B 119)	8½	205	211½	2532
149	(Hungary) Ádám Kozák	2448	0 (W 22)	0 (B 38)	1 (W 172)	0 (B 121)	0 (B 160)	1 (W 155)	1 (B 98)	1 (W 138)	½ (B 64)	0 (W 37)	1 (B 110)	0 (W 53)	½ (B 93)	0 (W 87)	0 (B 97)	1 (W 147)	0 (B 117)	1 (W 159)	½ (B 143)	0 (W 129)	0 (B 128)	8½	201½	207	2561
150	(India) Sankalp Gupta	2323	0 (B 97)	1 (W 90)	½ (B 178)	0 (W 62)	½ (B 138)	1 (W 135)	1 (B 159)	0 (W 48)	½ (B 80)	0 (W 45)	0 (B 82)	1 (W 160)	1 (B 96)	½ (W 103)	0 (B 87)	0 (W 61)	0 (B 136)	0 (W 134)	½ (B 153)	0 (W 130)	1 (B 165)	8½	198½	206	2558
151	(Armenia) Hovhannes Gabuzyan	2580	½ (B 115)	0 (W 163)	1 (B 139)	½ (W 89)	0 (B 133)	0 (W 123)	1 (B 140)	0 (W 44)	1 (B 153)	0 (W 88)	0 (B 92)	1 (W 137)	1 (B 152)	1 (W 124)	0 (B 69)	0 (W 108)	½ (B 126)	0 (W 105)	½ (B 122)	½ (W 128)	0 (B 130)	8½	193½	201½	2419
152	(Poland) Marcel Kanarek	2342	½ (W 53)	0 (B 85)	0 (W 161)	½ (B 116)	1 (W 168)	1 (B 129)	1 (W 81)	0 (W 62)	0 (B 135)	0 (B 35)	1 (W 40)	0 (B 121)	0 (W 151)	0 (B 126)	½ (W 127)	1 (B 160)	0 (W 146)	1 (B 164)	0 (W 112)	0 (B 148)	1 (W 166)	8½	192	199½	2531
153	(Poland) Mateusz Kolosowski	2474	½ (W 28)	0 (B 23)	0 (W 83)	0 (B 128)	1 (B 130)	0 (W 117)	½ (W 167)	1 (B 169)	0 (W 151)	1 (B 157)	0 (W 63)	1 (B 161)	½ (B 65)	0 (W 110)	0 (W 113)	½ (B 129)	½ (W 166)	½ (B 154)	½ (W 150)	0 (B 146)	1 (W 168)	8½	190	197	2478
154	(Romania) Vladislav Nevednichy	2379	0 (B 76)	0 (W 64)	0 (B 104)	1 (B 170)	0 (W 77)	1 (W 177)	0 (B 69)	0 (W 168)	1 (B 130)	0 (W 65)	1 (B 157)	½ (W 98)	0 (B 60)	(W 167)	1 (B 141)	0 (W 117)	½ (B 165)	½ (W 153)	½ (B 124)	1 (W 156)	0 (B 122)	8½	189½	192½	2452
155	(Poland) Jacek Gdański	2367	0 (B 178)	½ (W 62)	0 (B 91)	0 (W 109)	½ (B 164)	0 (B 149)	1 (W 141)	0 (B 116)	½ (W 162)	1 (W 171)	1 (B 168)	½ (W 114)	0 (B 40)	0 (W 98)	½ (W 160)	0 (B 128)	1 (W 157)	0 (B 127)	0 (W 158)	1 (B 176)	1 (W 169)	8½	183½	187	2456
156	(Poland) Krystian Kuzmicz	2281	0 (W 50)	1 (B 35)	0 (W 174)	0 (B 69)	0 (W 74)	0 (B 125)	1 (B 177)	0 (W 140)	1 (B 158)	½ (B 126)	0 (W 77)	½ (B 164)	0 (W 161)	½ (B 130)	1 (W 157)	1 (B 127)	0 (B 138)	0 (W 165)	1 (W 168)	0 (B 154)	1 (B 175)	8½	183	186	2451
157	(Poland) Oskar Wieczorek	2258	0 (W 68)	0 (B 40)	0 (B 88)	1 (W 118)	0 (B 108)	1 (W 175)	1 (B 165)	0 (W 69)	0 (B 74)	0 (W 153)	0 (W 154)	1 (B 171)	½ (B 174)	½ (W 168)	0 (b 156)	½ (W 164)	0 (B 155)	1 (W 177)	1 (B 169)	0 (W 123)	1 (B 176)	8½	173½	176½	2410
158	(Poland) Piotr Lopusiewicz	2279	0 (B 117)	1 (W 159)	0 (B 97)	0 (W 7)	0 (B 165)	0 (W 140)	½ (B 176)	0 (W 164)	0 (B 156)	1 (W 130)	1 (B 141)	0 (B 162)	0 (W 171)	½ (B 177)	1 (W 163)	½ (B 168)	0 (W 160)	1 (W 170)	1 (B 155)	0 (W 124)	1 (B 167)	8½	167	170	2406
159	(Germany) Ilja Schneider	2524	0 (W 73)	0 (B 158)	1 (W 170)	1 (B 176)	1 (W 43)	0 (B 61)	0 (W 150)	0 (B 145)	0 (W 148)	1 (B 166)	1 (W 113)	½ (B 146)	0 (W 95)	1 (B 125)	0 (W 107)	½ (B 92)	0 (W 139)	0 (B 149)	0 (W 115)	1 (B 162)	0 (B 141)	8	186½	190	2423
160	(Germany) Andreas Heimann	2690	0 (B 114)	0 (W 137)	0 (B 49)	1 (B 175)	1 (W 149)	0 (W 88)	1 (B 32)	½ (W 81)	0 (B 147)	0 (B 111)	½ (W 136)	0 (B 150)	0 (W 166)	1 (W 171)	½ (B 155)	0 (W 152)	1 (B 158)	½ (W 123)	1 (B 144)	0 (B 134)	0 (W 140)	8	183½	188	2406
161	(Germany) Maximilian Berchtenbreiter	2552	½ (B 142)	0 (W 24)	1 (B 152)	0 (W 19)	0 (B 163)	0 (W 128)	1 (B 139)	0 (B 134)	½ (W 164)	0 (W 140)	1 (B 167)	0 (W 153)	1 (B 156)	1 (W 147)	0 (B 144)	0 (W 137)	0 (B 123)	0 (W 141)	1 (B 175)	1 (W 171)	0 (B 136)	8	183	187½	2421
162	(Brazil) Darcy Lima	2379	0 (W 47)	0 (B 61)	0 (B 93)	1 (W 179)	0 (B 59)	1 (W 130)	0 (B 135)	0 (W 97)	½ (B 155)	1 (W 141)	0 (B 109)	1 (W 158)	0 (B 110)	1 (B 172)	0 (W 116)	½ (W 165)	0 (B 96)	0 (B 128)	1 (w 176)	0 (W 159)	1 (B 177)	8	180½	183½	2434
163	(Kyrgyzstan) Semetey Tologontegin	2224	½ (W 129)	1 (B 151)	0 (W 13)	0 (B 50)	1 (W 161)	0 (B 53)	0 (W 103)	0 (B 96)	½ (B 126)	0 (W 137)	0 (W 118)	1 (B 170)	½ (W 164)	0 (B 116)	0 (B 158)	½ (W 176)	1 (B 175)	0 (W 167)	1 (B 177)	0 (W 144)	1 (W 172)	8	174	177	2425
164	(Poland) Daniel Sadzikowski	2415	0 (W 54)	0 (B 94)	½ (W 175)	0 (B 113)	½ (W 155)	½ (B 169)	0 (W 129)	1 (B 158)	½ (B 161)	0 (W 172)	½ (B 128)	½ (W 156)	½ (B 163)	½ (W 141)	0 (B 147)	½ (B 157)	1 (W 176)	0 (W 152)	½ (B 171)	½ (W 167)	½ (B 144)	8	166	169½	2333
165	(Sweden) Pontus Carlsson	2516	1 (W 38)	0 (B 29)	0 (W 28)	0 (B 63)	1 (W 158)	0 (B 77)	0 (W 157)	1 (B 118)	0 (W 115)	0 (B 169)	0 (W 166)	1 (B 175)	½ (W 172)	0 (B 128)	1 (W 130)	½ (B 162)	½ (W 154)	1 (B 156)	0 (W 95)	0 (B 139)	0 (W 150)	7½	189½	194	2405
166	(Poland) Krzysztof Jakubowski	2373	½ (B 65)	0 (W 98)	0 (B 86)	½ (W 59)	0 (B 90)	1 (B 116)	0 (W 74)	0 (W 108)	1 (B 177)	0 (W 159)	1 (B 165)	0 (W 117)	1 (B 160)	0 (W 137)	1 (B 138)	0 (W 124)	½ (B 153)	0 (W 140)	0 (B 130)	1 (W 175)	0 (B 152)	7½	186	189	2490
167	(Poland) Bartlomiej Heberla	2373	0 (W 42)	0 (B 174)	0 (B 90)	1 (W 171)	0 (B 57)	½ (W 168)	½ (B 153)	0 (W 32)	1 (W 175)	0 (B 40)	0 (W 161)	0 (B 130)	1 (-)	(B 154)	½ (W 169)	1 (B 141)	0 (W 129)	1 (B 163)	0 (W 102)	½ (B 164)	0 (W 158)	7½	183	187½	2420
168	(Poland) Michał Krasenkow	2543	0 (B 1)	1 (W 170)	0 (B 2)	0 (W 144)	0 (B 152)	½ (B 167)	½ (W 169)	1 (B 154)	½ (W 125)	0 (B 139)	0 (W 155)	1 (W 128)	0 (B 113)	½ (B 157)	0 (W 115)	½ (W 158)	0 (B 147)	1 (W 175)	0 (B 156)	1 (W 177)	0 (B 153)	7½	181	184	2366
169	(Poland) Rafal Lubczynski	2361	0 (W 31)	0 (B 121)	0 (B 96)	1 (W 140)	0 (B 88)	½ (W 164)	½ (B 168)	0 (W 153)	1 (B 98)	1 (W 165)	0 (B 97)	0 (W 40)	0 (B 138)	½ (W 175)	½ (B 167)	½ (W 171)	0 (B 130)	1 (B 176)	0 (W 157)	1 (W 170)	0 (B 155)	7½	177	180½	2432
170	(Venezuela) Cristobal Jose Blanco Acevedo	2350	0 (W 143)	0 (B 168)	0 (B 159)	0 (W 154)	0 (B 140)	1 (B 179)	1 (W 130)	0 (B 125)	0 (W 118)	1 (W 177)	0 (B 98)	0 (W 163)	0 (B 128)	1 (W 176)	1 (B 175)	0 (W 138)	0 (W 141)	0 (B 158)	1 (W 172)	0 (B 169)	1 (B 171)	7	158½	161½	2338
171	(Poland) Grzegorz Masternak	2188	0 (W 112)	0 (B 74)	0 (W 122)	0 (B 167)	1 (-)	0 (B 148)	0 (W 116)	0 (B 175)	1 (W 179)	0 (B 155)	1 (W 176)	0 (W 157)	1 (B 158)	0 (B 160)	1 (W 177)	½ (B 169)	0 (W 127)	1 (B 172)	½ (W 164)	0 (B 161)	0 (W 170)	7	156½	159½	2339
172	(Libya) Ali Elier	2194	0 (B 26)	0 (W 108)	0 (B 149)	1 (-)	1 (W 116)	0 (W 104)	½ (B 127)	½ (B 114)	0 (W 139)	1 (B 164)	0 (W 74)	0 (B 136)	½ (B 165)	0 (W 162)	0 (B 176)	0 (W 175)	1 (B 177)	0 (W 171)	0 (B 170)	0 (W 141)	0 (B 163)	5½	170½	173½	2348
173	Gleb Dudin	2339	1 (W 174)	½ (B 31)	1 (W 75)	1 (B 22)	0 (W 13)	0 (B 1)	0 (W 42)	½ (B 85)	0 (W 50)	½ (B 114)	0 (W 111)	0 (B 96)	0 (W 129)	0 (-)	0 (-)	0 (-)	0 (-)	0 (-)	0 (-)	0 (-)	0 (-)	4½	200½	206	2613
174	Mikhail Antipov	2587	0 (B 173)	1 (W 167)	1 (B 156)	½ (W 21)	½ (B 1)	½ (W 70)	0 (W 39)	0 (B 146)	0 (W 67)	0 (B 115)	½ (W 126)	0 (B 118)	½ (W 157)	0 (-)	0 (-)	0 (-)	0 (-)	0 (-)	0 (-)	0 (-)	0 (-)	4½	186	191½	2469
175	(Poland) Tomasz Gluszko	2086	0 (W 79)	0 (B 127)	½ (B 164)	0 (W 160)	0 (B 139)	0 (B 157)	½ (W 179)	1 (W 171)	0 (B 167)	0 (W 98)	1 (B 177)	0 (W 165)	0 (B 176)	½ (B 169)	0 (W 170)	1 (B 172)	0 (W 163)	0 (B 168)	0 (W 161)	0 (B 166)	0 (W 156)	4½	154	157	2381
176	(Tajikistan) Mukhammad Yunusov	1716	1 (-)	0 (W 110)	0 (B 99)	0 (W 159)	0 (B 44)	0 (B 118)	½ (W 158)	0 (B 130)	0 (W 141)	0 (B 179)	0 (B 171)	0 (W 177)	1 (W 175)	0 (B 170)	1 (W 172)	(B 163)	0 (B 164)	0 (W 169)	0 (B 162)	0 (W 155)	0 (W 157)	4	164½	167½	2313
177	(Iraq) Kasib Laith	2010	0 (W 51)	0 (B 32)	1 (-)	0 (B 40)	0 (W 124)	0 (B 154)	0 (W 156)	1 (B 179)	0 (W 166)	0 (B 170)	0 (W 175)	1 (B 176)	0 (B 141)	½ (W 158)	0 (B 171)	0 (W 130)	0 (W 172)	0 (B 157)	0 (W 163)	0 (B 168)	0 (W 162)	3½	168	171½	2296
178	(Hungary) Viktor Erdős	2599	1 (W 155)	0 (B 147)	½ (W 150)	0 (B 72)	0 (W 113)	0 (-)	0 (-)	0 (-)	0 (-)	0 (-)	0 (-)	0 (-)	0 (-)	0 (-)	0 (-)	0 (-)	0 (-)	0 (-)	0 (-)	0 (-)	0 (-)	1½	144	146½	2284
179	(Yemen) Sabri Abdul-Mawla Sallam	2194	0 (W 78)	0 (B 136)	0 (W 124)	0 (B 162)	0 (B 118)	0 (W 170)	½ (B 175)	0 (W 177)	0 (B 171)	1 (W 176)	0 (B 130)	0 (W 141)	0 (-)	0 (-)	0 (-)	0 (-)	0 (-)	0 (-)	0 (-)	0 (-)	0 (-)	1½	127	129½	2257

Three players (Maxime Vachier-Lagrave, Jan-Krzysztof Duda, and Alireza Firouzja) were tied for first after 21 rounds. Among these, the two players with the highest Buchholz Cut 1 score (Vachier-Lagrave and Duda) played a title play-off to decide the winner. Vachier-Lagrave won the match 2:1 to become World Blitz Champion.

== Women's tournament results ==
The following table lists all participants, with the results from the 17 rounds. They are ranked according to the results, taking into account the tie-breaks.

Notation: "1 (B 56)" indicates a win (1 point) with black pieces (B) against player who finished in 56th place.

Rank	Name	Rating	1	2	3	4	5	6	7	8	9	10	11	12	13	14	15	16	17	Total	BC1	BS	AROC1
1	(Kazakhstan) Bibisara Assaubayeva	2285	1 (B 56)	1 (W 60)	1 (B 77)	1 (W 9)	0 (B 3)	1 (B 2)	1 (W 12)	1 (W 4)	1 (B 48)	1 (B 14)	1 (W 5)	½ (W 20)	1 (B 6)	1 (W 26)	0 (B 10)	1 (B 8)	½ (W 7)	14	170	177½	2328
2	Alexandra Kosteniuk	2475	0 (B 51)	1 (W 78)	1 (B 46)	1 (W 70)	1 (B 28)	0 (W 1)	1 (B 49)	1 (W 69)	1 (B 31)	0 (W 5)	0 (W 3)	1 (B 39)	½ (W 40)	1 (B 15)	1 (W 14)	1 (B 22)	1 (W 10)	12½	157½	164½	2274
3	Valentina Gunina	2452	1 (W 32)	1 (B 26)	1 (W 22)	1 (B 6)	1 (W 1)	0 (B 8)	½ (W 50)	0 (B 14)	1 (W 43)	1 (W 20)	1 (B 2)	1 (B 40)	1 (W 5)	0 (B 10)	½ (W 4)	0 (B 7)	1 (W 15)	12	173	181½	2332
4	Polina Shuvalova	2306	1 (W 40)	1 (B 88)	½ (W 42)	1 (B 39)	1 (W 41)	1 (B 16)	1 (W 8)	0 (B 1)	0 (W 14)	½ (B 11)	0 (W 6)	½ (B 21)	1 (W 32)	1 (B 9)	½ (B 3)	1 (W 20)	1 (W 5)	12	167½	174	2271
5	(India) Koneru Humpy	2483	1 (B 27)	1 (W 46)	0 (B 28)	1 (W 22)	1 (B 48)	½ (W 23)	½ (B 69)	1 (W 26)	1 (W 8)	1 (B 2)	0 (B 1)	1 (W 29)	0 (B 3)	1 (W 14)	½ (B 12)	1 (W 10)	0 (B 4)	11½	168½	176	2326
6	(Ukraine) Nataliya Buksa	2199	1 (B 95)	1 (W 61)	1 (B 19)	0 (W 3)	1 (B 9)	½ (W 20)	0 (B 17)	½ (W 23)	1 (B 44)	1 (W 50)	1 (B 4)	1 (W 14)	0 (W 1)	½ (B 8)	0 (W 7)	1 (B 29)	1 (W 21)	11½	167½	173½	2329
7	(Georgia (country)) Nana Dzagnidze	2394	0 (B 71)	1 (W 54)	1 (B 27)	½ (W 26)	0 (B 68)	1 (W 61)	1 (B 13)	½ (W 30)	½ (B 28)	½ (W 16)	0 (B 21)	1 (W 69)	1 (B 39)	1 (W 25)	1 (B 6)	1 (W 3)	½ (B 1)	11½	156½	164	2193
8	Aleksandra Goryachkina	2441	1 (B 57)	1 (W 64)	1 (B 68)	1 (W 28)	1 (B 23)	1 (W 3)	0 (B 4)	½ (W 20)	0 (B 5)	1 (W 48)	0 (B 14)	½ (W 26)	1 (B 29)	½ (W 6)	1 (B 18)	0 (W 1)	½ (B 11)	11	166½	174	2298
9	(Ukraine) Anna Muzychuk	2509	1 (W 62)	1 (B 73)	1 (W 15)	0 (B 1)	0 (W 6)	0 (B 33)	1 (B 60)	1 (W 70)	1 (B 18)	½ (W 23)	1 (B 31)	1 (W 24)	0 (B 14)	0 (W 4)	1 (B 48)	½ (W 11)	1 (B 20)	11	161	168½	2274
10	Kateryna Lagno	2592	0 (B 68)	½ (W 99)	1 (B 90)	½ (W 71)	½ (W 39)	1 (B 35)	½ (W 15)	0 (B 43)	1 (W 86)	1 (B 49)	1 (B 16)	1 (W 27)	1 (B 20)	1 (W 3)	1 (W 1)	0 (B 5)	0 (B 2)	11	156½	163	2274
11	(Bulgaria) Antoaneta Stefanova	2477	1 (W 80)	0 (B 45)	0 (W 49)	1 (W 95)	1 (B 64)	½ (B 15)	1 (W 41)	1 (B 24)	1 (W 27)	½ (W 4)	0 (B 29)	0 (B 22)	1 (W 62)	1 (B 21)	1 (W 26)	½ (B 9)	½ (W 8)	11	152	158	2230
12	(Germany) Elisabeth Pähtz	2412	0 (B 63)	1 (W 83)	1 (B 64)	1 (W 73)	1 (B 60)	½ (W 69)	0 (B 1)	1 (W 16)	½ (B 50)	½ (W 31)	0 (B 26)	1 (W 70)	½ (B 13)	0 (W 27)	1 (B 37)	1 (W 18)	1 (W 22)	11	148½	155½	2234
13	Olga Girya	2262	0 (W 88)	1 (B 87)	0 (W 89)	1 (B 81)	½ (W 40)	1 (B 95)	0 (W 7)	½ (B 32)	1 (W 80)	1 (B 25)	1 (W 33)	½ (B 17)	½ (W 12)	0 (B 22)	1 (B 23)	1 (W 27)	1 (W 14)	11	144½	150½	2183
14	(India) Vaishali Rameshbabu	2313	1 (B 98)	1 (W 63)	½ (B 48)	1 (W 72)	0 (B 16)	1 (W 68)	1 (B 23)	1 (W 3)	1 (B 4)	0 (W 1)	1 (W 8)	0 (B 6)	1 (W 9)	0 (B 5)	0 (B 2)	1 (W 19)	0 (B 13)	10½	168½	174½	2307
15	(Azerbaijan) Zeinab Mamedjarova	2250	1 (W 85)	1 (B 92)	0 (B 9)	1 (W 77)	0 (B 20)	½ (W 11)	½ (B 10)	1 (W 52)	0 (B 29)	½ (W 34)	1 (B 65)	1 (W 61)	1 (B 19)	0 (W 2)	1 (B 31)	1 (W 17)	0 (B 3)	10½	155½	162	2263
16	(Ukraine) Inna Gaponenko	2292	1 (W 105)	½ (W 71)	1 (B 65)	1 (B 42)	1 (W 14)	0 (W 4)	0 (B 48)	0 (B 12)	1 (W 73)	½ (B 7)	0 (W 10)	0 (B 62)	1 (W 78)	1 (B 49)	1 (W 39)	½ (B 26)	1 (W 32)	10½	149	156	2217
17	Anastasia Bodnaruk	2406	1 (W 78)	0 (B 39)	1 (W 80)	0 (B 49)	1 (W 62)	1 (B 70)	1 (W 6)	0 (B 22)	1 (W 33)	0 (B 27)	1 (B 68)	½ (W 13)	1 (B 51)	0 (W 18)	1 (W 40)	0 (B 15)	1 (W 26)	10½	147	154	2195
18	(Poland) Klaudia Kulon	2265	0 (W 30)	1 (B 96)	0 (W 82)	1 (B 83)	1 (W 78)	1 (B 21)	0 (W 39)	1 (B 49)	0 (W 9)	½ (B 32)	1 (W 73)	1 (B 48)	1 (W 28)	1 (B 17)	0 (W 8)	0 (B 12)	1 (W 29)	10½	145½	151½	2206
19	(United States) Anna Zatonskih	2371	1 (W 83)	1 (B 21)	0 (W 6)	1 (B 82)	0 (W 49)	0 (B 28)	1 (W 53)	1 (B 86)	1 (W 39)	0 (B 40)	½ (W 43)	1 (B 68)	0 (W 15)	1 (B 70)	1 (W 24)	0 (B 14)	1 (W 33)	10½	144	150½	2190
20	(Kazakhstan) Zhansaya Abdumalik	2380	0 (W 39)	1 (B 101)	1 (W 32)	1 (B 45)	1 (W 15)	½ (B 6)	1 (W 30)	½ (B 8)	1 (W 22)	0 (B 3)	1 (W 27)	½ (B 1)	0 (W 10)	1 (B 40)	½ (W 5)	0 (B 4)	0 (W 9)	10	170	174½	2281
21	(Bulgaria) Nurgyul Salimova	2071	1 (B 44)	0 (W 19)	1 (B 38)	1 (W 31)	0 (B 69)	0 (W 18)	1 (B 37)	1 (W 66)	0 (B 23)	1 (W 99)	1 (W 7)	½ (W 4)	½ (B 24)	0 (W 11)	1 (B 25)	1 (W 55)	0 (B 6)	10	159½	167	2313
22	(Poland) Monika Soćko	2230	1 (B 58)	1 (W 84)	0 (B 3)	0 (B 5)	1 (W 88)	1 (W 34)	1 (B 72)	1 (W 17)	0 (B 20)	0 (W 29)	1 (B 50)	1 (W 11)	0 (B 26)	1 (W 13)	1 (B 27)	0 (W 2)	0 (B 12)	10	159	165½	2294
23	(Ukraine) Mariya Muzychuk	2362	1 (W 101)	1 (B 76)	1 (W 45)	1 (B 30)	0 (W 8)	½ (B 5)	0 (W 14)	½ (B 6)	1 (W 21)	½ (B 9)	0 (W 40)	0 (B 32)	1 (W 73)	½ (B 28)	0 (W 13)	1 (B 39)	1 (W 43)	10	155½	160	2223
24	(Serbia) Teodora Injac	2320	1 (B 67)	½ (W 51)	½ (B 72)	½ (W 68)	0 (B 26)	1 (W 54)	1 (B 46)	0 (W 11)	1 (B 30)	1 (W 61)	1 (B 48)	0 (B 9)	½ (W 21)	½ (W 29)	0 (B 19)	½ (W 35)	1 (B 28)	10	147½	155	2196
25	(Germany) Annmarie Muetsch	2292	1 (B 52)	0 (W 48)	0 (B 60)	1 (W 67)	1 (B 63)	0 (W 27)	1 (B 84)	1 (W 71)	0 (B 26)	0 (W 13)	1 (B 45)	1 (W 50)	1 (W 30)	0 (B 7)	0 (W 21)	1 (B 41)	1 (W 40)	10	144½	151½	2126
26	(Ukraine) Olga Babiy	2179	1 (W 93)	0 (W 3)	1 (B 34)	½ (B 7)	1 (W 24)	½ (B 30)	1 (W 33)	0 (B 5)	1 (W 25)	½ (B 43)	1 (W 12)	½ (B 8)	1 (W 22)	0 (B 1)	0 (B 11)	½ (W 16)	0 (B 17)	9½	170	176½	2335
27	Alina Bivol	2167	0 (W 5)	1 (B 93)	0 (W 7)	1 (B 59)	1 (W 74)	1 (B 25)	1 (W 36)	1 (W 44)	0 (B 11)	1 (W 17)	0 (B 20)	0 (B 10)	1 (W 49)	1 (B 12)	0 (W 22)	0 (B 13)	½ (W 37)	9½	160	166½	2305
28	(Ukraine) Iulija Osmak	2198	1 (W 94)	1 (B 103)	1 (W 5)	0 (B 8)	0 (W 2)	1 (W 19)	0 (B 44)	1 (B 74)	½ (W 7)	0 (W 68)	1 (B 34)	1 (W 31)	0 (B 18)	½ (W 23)	½ (B 38)	1 (B 47)	0 (W 24)	9½	155½	156½	2319
29	Alina Kashlinskaya	2374	½ (B 90)	0 (W 77)	0 (B 52)	1 (W 101)	1 (W 92)	½ (B 40)	1 (W 42)	1 (B 36)	1 (W 15)	1 (B 22)	1 (W 11)	0 (B 5)	0 (W 8)	½ (B 24)	1 (W 32)	0 (W 6)	0 (B 18)	9½	152	156½	2196
30	(India) Vantika Agrawal	1917	1 (B 18)	1 (W 38)	1 (B 69)	0 (W 23)	1 (B 99)	½ (W 26)	0 (B 20)	½ (B 7)	0 (W 24)	0 (W 44)	1 (B 66)	1 (W 34)	0 (B 25)	0 (W 37)	1 (B 74)	½ (W 42)	1 (B 55)	9½	151	158½	2308
31	Aleksandra Maltsevskaya	2312	0 (W 76)	1 (B 40)	1 (W 81)	0 (B 21)	1 (W 32)	1 (B 42)	1 (W 71)	1 (B 39)	0 (W 2)	½ (B 12)	0 (W 9)	0 (B 28)	1 (W 68)	1 (B 51)	0 (W 15)	0 (B 33)	1 (W 53)	9½	149½	156½	2209
32	Baira Kovanova	2153	0 (B 3)	1 (W 104)	0 (B 20)	1 (W 100)	0 (B 31)	½ (W 75)	1 (B 79)	½ (W 13)	1 (B 66)	½ (W 18)	1 (B 74)	1 (W 23)	0 (B 4)	1 (W 35)	0 (B 29)	1 (W 48)	0 (B 16)	9½	147½	148½	2207
33	(Azerbaijan) Turkan Mamedjarova	2263	0 (B 65)	1 (W 102)	½ (B 79)	½ (W 52)	1 (B 77)	1 (W 9)	0 (B 26)	1 (W 72)	0 (B 17)	½ (W 70)	0 (B 13)	1 (B 63)	1 (W 61)	0 (W 48)	1 (B 60)	1 (W 31)	0 (B 19)	9½	140½	147½	2135
34	(Germany) Marta Michna	2433	1 (W 53)	0 (B 42)	0 (W 26)	1 (B 57)	1 (W 45)	0 (B 22)	0 (W 86)	1 (B 41)	1 (W 64)	½ (B 15)	0 (W 28)	0 (B 30)	0 (W 60)	1 (B 89)	1 (W 63)	1 (B 56)	1 (B 48)	9½	140½	147	2126
35	Leya Garifullina	2258	0 (B 61)	1 (W 58)	½ (B 95)	1 (W 65)	0 (B 72)	0 (W 10)	1 (B 75)	1 (W 63)	0 (B 68)	1 (W 57)	0 (W 51)	1 (B 60)	1 (W 55)	0 (B 32)	1 (W 50)	½ (B 24)	½ (B 38)	9½	137	143	2146
36	(Ukraine) Maria Efimenko	2207	1 (B 75)	½ (W 65)	1 (B 71)	0 (W 48)	1 (B 79)	(W 72)	0 (B 27)	0 (W 29)	½ (B 57)	1 (W 60)	0 (B 61)	½ (W 38)	1 (B 44)	0 (W 39)	½ (B 52)	1 (W 64)	1 (B 51)	9½	135	142	2111
37	(Armenia) Elina Danielian	2285	1 (W 96)	1 (B 82)	(W 39)	0 (B 41)	½ (W 42)	0 (B 71)	0 (W 21)	1 (B 83)	0 (B 61)	1 (W 67)	0 (W 62)	1 (B 72)	1 (W 87)	1 (B 30)	0 (W 12)	1 (B 45)	½ (B 27)	9½	135	141	2081
38	(Luxembourg) Elvira Berend	2315	1 (W 81)	0 (B 30)	0 (W 21)	0 (B 78)	1 (W 85)	0 (B 88)	1 (W 82)	½ (B 53)	1 (W 56)	½ (B 51)	½ (W 86)	½ (B 36)	1 (W 45)	1 (B 42)	½ (W 28)	½ (B 40)	½ (W 35)	9½	134	140½	2096
39	(Azerbaijan) Khanim Balajayeva	2119	1 (B 20)	1 (W 17)	½ (B 37)	0 (W 4)	½ (B 10)	1 (W 99)	1 (B 18)	0 (W 31)	0 (B 19)	1 (W 69)	1 (B 44)	0 (W 2)	0 (W 7)	1 (B 36)	0 (B 16)	0 (W 23)	1 (B 52)	9	163½	171	2346
40	(Poland) Oliwia Kiołbasa	2036	0 (B 4)	0 (W 31)	1 (B 91)	1 (W 66)	½ (B 13)	½ (W 29)	1 (B 99)	1 (W 46)	1 (B 69)	1 (W 19)	1 (B 23)	0 (W 3)	½ (B 2)	0 (W 20)	0 (B 17)	½ (W 38)	0 (B 25)	9	160½	167	2330
41	Elena Semenova	1954	½ (B 99)	1 (W 90)	1 (B 51)	1 (W 37)	0 (B 4)	0 (W 48)	0 (B 11)	0 (W 34)	0 (B 46)	1 (W 54)	1 (B 53)	0 (B 55)	1 (W 86)	1 (B 73)	½ (W 43)	0 (W 25)	1 (B 66)	9	143½	150	2245
42	(Greece) Ekaterini Pavlidou	2177	1 (B 100)	1 (W 34)	½ (B 4)	0 (W 16)	½ (B 37)	0 (W 31)	0 (B 29)	0 (W 57)	1 (B 84)	1 (W 88)	0 (B 69)	1 (W 52)	1 (B 74)	0 (W 38)	1 (W 54)	½ (B 30)	½ (W 47)	9	142	147	2199
43	(Poland) Joanna Majdan-Gajewska	2270	0 (B 84)	1 (W 56)	0 (B 61)	1 (W 76)	1 (B 52)	½ (W 60)	1 (B 68)	1 (W 10)	0 (B 3)	½ (W 26)	½ (B 19)	0 (W 51)	0 (B 70)	1 (W 71)	½ (B 41)	1 (W 66)	0 (B 23)	9	141½	148½	2174
44	(Azerbaijan) Gulnar Mammadova	2330	0 (W 21)	0 (B 81)	1 (W 47)	1 (B 53)	1 (W 80)	1 (B 73)	1 (W 28)	0 (B 27)	0 (W 6)	1 (B 30)	0 (W 39)	0 (B 49)	0 (W 36)	0 (B 54)	1 (W 85)	1 (W 60)	1 (B 64)	9	140	146½	2140
45	(Argentina) María Florencia Fernández	2184	1 (B 104)	1 (W 11)	0 (B 23)	0 (W 20)	0 (B 34)	0 (W 67)	1 (B 81)	0 (W 51)	1 (B 102)	1 (W 52)	0 (W 25)	1 (B 85)	0 (B 38)	1 (W 79)	1 (B 62)	0 (W 37)	1 (B 61)	9	138	139	2163
46	Olga Badelka	2188	1 (W 89)	0 (B 5)	0 (W 2)	½ (B 96)	1 (W 51)	1 (B 97)	0 (W 24)	0 (B 40)	1 (W 41)	0 (B 47)	0 (W 63)	0 (B 54)	1 (W 92)	1 (B 91)	1 (W 72)	½ (B 61)	1 (W 62)	9	135	141	2123
47	(Georgia (country)) Nino Batsiashvili	2294	0 (B 72)	½ (W 52)	0 (B 44)	1 (W 90)	0 (B 95)	1 (W 65)	1 (B 54)	0 (W 68)	1 (B 71)	1 (W 46)	0 (B 70)	1 (B 86)	0 (W 48)	1 (B 63)	1 (W 51)	0 (W 28)	½ (B 42)	9	129½	135½	2132
48	(Kazakhstan) Meruert Kamalidenova	2090	1 (W 97)	1 (B 25)	½ (W 14)	1 (B 36)	0 (W 5)	1 (B 41)	1 (W 16)	1 (B 50)	0 (W 1)	0 (B 8)	0 (W 24)	0 (W 18)	1 (B 47)	1 (B 33)	0 (W 9)	0 (B 32)	0 (W 34)	8½	163	169	2330
49	(Mongolia) Davaadembereliin Nomin-Erdene	2188	0 (B 77)	1 (W 75)	1 (B 11)	1 (W 17)	1 (B 19)	0 (B 50)	0 (W 2)	0 (W 18)	1 (B 52)	0 (W 10)	1 (B 95)	1 (W 44)	0 (B 27)	0 (W 16)	0 (B 64)	1 (W 65)	½ (B 54)	8½	151	157	2230
50	(Ukraine) Natalia Zhukova	2369	1 (B 54)	0 (W 68)	1 (B 57)	1 (W 63)	1 (B 61)	1 (W 49)	½ (B 3)	0 (W 48)	½ (W 12)	0 (B 6)	0 (W 22)	0 (B 25)	½ (B 69)	1 (W 62)	0 (B 35)	0 (W 51)	1 (W 71)	8½	145½	153	2213
51	(Turkey) Ekaterina Atalik	2153	1 (W 2)	½ (B 24)	0 (W 41)	0 (W 79)	0 (B 46)	1 (B 96)	½ (W 87)	1 (B 45)	1 (W 74)	½ (W 38)	1 (B 35)	1 (B 43)	0 (W 17)	0 (W 31)	0 (B 47)	1 (B 50)	0 (W 36)	8½	145½	151½	2236
52	Viktoriya Loskutova	2001	0 (W 25)	½ (B 47)	1 (W 29)	½ (B 33)	0 (W 43)	1 (B 62)	1 (W 97)	0 (B 15)	0 (W 49)	0 (B 45)	1 (W 64)	0 (B 42)	1 (W 80)	1 (B 78)	½ (W 36)	1 (B 73)	0 (W 39)	8½	140	146	2231
53	Anastasya Paramzina	2149	0 (B 34)	0 (W 100)	1 (B 58)	0 (W 44)	1 (B 76)	1 (W 77)	0 (B 19)	½ (W 38)	0 (B 60)	1 (B 87)	0 (W 41)	1 (W 89)	1 (B 65)	0 (B 55)	1 (W 69)	1 (W 70)	0 (B 31)	8½	133	138	2111
54	Evgenija Ovod	2092	0 (W 50)	0 (B 7)	1 (W 94)	½ (B 97)	1 (W 96)	0 (B 24)	0 (W 47)	1 (B 92)	0 (W 55)	0 (B 41)	1 (W 91)	1 (W 46)	½ (B 79)	1 (W 44)	0 (B 42)	1 (B 67)	½ (W 49)	8½	132½	138½	2151
55	(India) Padmini Rout	2276	1 (B 102)	0 (W 72)	1 (B 84)	0 (W 60)	0 (B 71)	½ (W 63)	1 (B 90)	0 (W 61)	1 (B 54)	0 (W 65)	1 (B 75)	1 (W 41)	0 (B 35)	1 (W 53)	1 (W 70)	0 (B 21)	0 (W 30)	8½	130½	137	2048
56	(Azerbaijan) Govhar Beydullayeva	1972	0 (W 1)	0 (B 43)	0 (B 86)	½ (W 58)	0 (B 91)	1 (W 93)	1 (B 94)	1 (W 79)	0 (B 38)	0 (W 63)	1 (B 98)	1 (W 57)	0 (B 71)	1 (W 75)	1 (B 68)	0 (W 34)	1 (B 70)	8½	130	136	2104
57	(Ukraine) Anastasiya Rakhmangulova	2152	0 (W 8)	1 (B 59)	0 (W 50)	0 (W 34)	1 (B 98)	½ (B 92)	½ (W 95)	1 (B 42)	½ (W 36)	0 (B 35)	0 (W 60)	0 (B 56)	0 (W 91)	1 (B 93)	1 (W 89)	1 (B 87)	1 (W 72)	8½	128	134	2038
58	(Poland) Anna Kubicka	1903	0 (W 22)	0 (B 35)	0 (W 53)	½ (B 56)	0 (W 87)	1 (B 101)	½ (W 96)	1 (B 94)	1 (W 83)	0 (B 62)	0 (W 81)	0 (B 64)	1 (W 98)	½ (B 80)	1 (W 91)	1 (B 78)	1 (W 69)	8½	119½	124	2099
59	(Poland) Klara Szczotka	1584	0 (B 64)	0 (W 57)	1 (B 98)	0 (W 27)	0 (B 86)	0 (W 102)	1 (B 93)	0 (W 81)	1 (W 94)	1 (B 96)	0 (W 72)	0 (B 67)	1 (W 88)	1 (B 76)	½ (W 87)	1 (B 97)	1 (W 73)	8½	115	121	2066
60	(Kazakhstan) Assel Serikbay	2044	1 (W 74)	0 (B 1)	1 (W 25)	1 (B 55)	0 (W 12)	½ (B 43)	0 (W 9)	0 (B 73)	1 (W 53)	0 (B 36)	1 (B 57)	0 (W 35)	1 (B 34)	1 (W 69)	0 (W 33)	0 (B 44)	½ (W 63)	8	150½	158	2288
61	(Ukraine) Sofiia Hryzlova	1908	1 (W 35)	0 (B 6)	1 (W 43)	1 (B 74)	0 (W 50)	0 (B 7)	½ (W 73)	1 (B 55)	1 (W 37)	0 (B 24)	1 (W 36)	0 (B 15)	0 (B 33)	1 (W 68)	0 (B 66)	½ (W 46)	0 (W 45)	8	148½	156	2262
62	(Romania) Mihaela Sandu	2169	0 (B 9)	0 (W 95)	1 (B 102)	1 (W 84)	0 (B 17)	0 (W 52)	1 (B 76)	1 (W 67)	0 (B 99)	1 (W 58)	1 (B 37)	1 (W 16)	0 (B 11)	0 (B 50)	0 (W 45)	1 (W 79)	0 (B 46)	8	141	147	2171
63	(Poland) Jolanta Zawadzka	2149	1 (W 12)	0 (B 14)	1 (W 97)	0 (B 50)	0 (W 25)	½ (B 55)	1 (W 92)	0 (B 35)	0 (W 65)	1 (B 56)	1 (B 46)	0 (W 33)	1 (B 75)	0 (W 47)	0 (B 34)	1 (W 90)	½ (B 60)	8	140	146	2212
64	(France) Nino Maisuradze	2175	1 (W 59)	0 (B 8)	0 (W 12)	1 (B 103)	0 (W 11)	1 (B 89)	0 (W 74)	1 (B 88)	0 (B 34)	0 (W 95)	0 (B 52)	1 (W 58)	1 (W 85)	1 (B 87)	1 (W 49)	0 (B 36)	0 (W 44)	8	134½	135½	2103
65	(Kazakhstan) Liya Kurmangaliyeva	1917	1 (W 33)	½ (B 36)	0 (W 16)	0 (B 35)	0 (W 97)	0 (B 47)	1 (W 91)	1 (W 90)	1 (B 63)	1 (B 55)	0 (W 15)	0 (B 73)	0 (W 53)	1 (B 86)	(W 78)	0 (B 49)	1 (W 80)	8	132½	138½	2217
66	(Poland) Joanna Dworakowska	2228	0 (W 82)	1 (B 85)	0 (W 92)	0 (B 40)	1 (W 93)	1 (B 78)	1 (W 88)	0 (B 21)	0 (W 32)	1 (B 72)	0 (W 30)	0 (B 87)	1 (W 81)	1 (B 67)	1 (W 61)	0 (B 43)	0 (W 41)	8	126	132½	1993
67	Mariya Yakimova	2070	0 (W 24)	0 (B 97)	1 (W 93)	0 (B 25)	1 (W 103)	1 (B 45)	0 (W 70)	0 (B 62)	1 (W 96)	0 (B 37)	0 (B 85)	1 (W 59)	1 (B 95)	0 (W 66)	1 (B 82)	0 (W 54)	1 (B 79)	8	124	125	2052
68	(Israel) Marsel Efroimski	2173	1 (W 10)	1 (B 50)	0 (W 8)	½ (B 24)	1 (W 7)	0 (B 14)	0 (W 43)	1 (B 47)	1 (W 35)	1 (B 28)	0 (W 17)	0 (W 19)	0 (B 31)	0 (B 61)	0 (W 56)	0 (B 72)	1 (B 85)	7½	154	160½	2277
69	(Romania) Irina Bulmaga	2271	1 (W 87)	1 (B 79)	0 (W 30)	1 (B 92)	1 (W 21)	½ (B 12)	½ (W 5)	0 (B 2)	0 (W 40)	0 (B 39)	1 (W 42)	0 (B 7)	½ (W 50)	0 (B 60)	0 (B 53)	1 (W 75)	0 (B 58)	7½	147	153½	2140
70	(Poland) Aleksandra Lach	2204	0 (W 79)	1 (B 94)	1 (W 103)	0 (B 2)	1 (W 82)	0 (W 17)	1 (B 67)	0 (B 9)	1 (W 72)	½ (B 33)	1 (W 47)	0 (B 12)	1 (W 43)	0 (W 19)	0 (B 55)	0 (B 53)	0 (W 56)	7½	144½	145½	2192
71	(Armenia) Susanna Gaboyan	2126	1 (W 7)	½ (B 16)	0 (W 36)	½ (B 10)	1 (W 55)	1 (W 37)	0 (B 31)	0 (B 25)	0 (W 47)	0 (B 86)	1 (W 84)	½ (B 79)	1 (W 56)	0 (B 43)	0 (W 73)	1 (W 74)	0 (B 50)	7½	143½	150	2261
72	(Poland) Julia Antolak	2008	1 (W 47)	1 (B 55)	½ (W 24)	0 (B 14)	1 (W 35)	½ (B 36)	0 (W 22)	0 (B 33)	0 (B 70)	0 (W 66)	1 (B 59)	0 (W 37)	1 (B 76)	½ (W 74)	0 (B 46)	1 (W 68)	0 (B 57)	7½	142½	150	2234
73	(Spain) Marta García Martín	2194	1 (B 91)	0 (W 9)	1 (B 100)	0 (B 12)	1 (W 89)	0 (W 44)	½ (B 61)	1 (W 60)	0 (B 16)	1 (W 75)	0 (B 18)	1 (W 65)	0 (B 23)	0 (W 41)	1 (B 71)	0 (W 52)	0 (B 59)	7½	139½	144½	2075
74	(Poland) Karina Cyfka	2311	0 (B 60)	1 (W 98)	1 (B 76)	0 (W 61)	0 (B 27)	1 (W 79)	1 (B 64)	0 (W 28)	0 (B 51)	1 (W 80)	0 (W 32)	1 (B 81)	0 (W 42)	½ (B 72)	0 (W 30)	0 (B 71)	1 (W 88)	7½	129½	135½	2079
75	(Poland) Martyna Wikar	1899	0 (W 36)	0 (B 49)	1 (W 101)	0 (B 80)	1 (W 81)	½ (B 32)	0 (W 35)	1 (B 97)	1 (W 78)	0 (B 73)	0 (W 55)	1 (B 83)	0 (W 63)	0 (B 56)	1 (W 84)	0 (B 69)	1 (W 87)	7½	124½	129	2157
76	(Netherlands) Anna-Maja Kazarian	2047	1 (B 31)	0 (W 23)	0 (W 74)	0 (B 43)	0 (W 53)	1 (B 85)	0 (W 62)	1 (W 89)	0 (B 95)	1 (B 93)	0 (W 79)	1 (B 84)	0 (W 72)	0 (W 59)	½ (B 101)	1 (B 92)	1 (W 91)	7½	121	125½	2005
77	(Kyrgyzstan) Begimai Zairbek kyzy	1701	1 (W 49)	1 (B 29)	0 (W 1)	0 (B 15)	0 (W 33)	0 (B 53)	0 (W 83)	0 (B 96)	0 (W 100)	½ (B 104)	0 (W 94)	1 (B 103)	0 (B 101)	1 (W 98)	1 (B 95)	1 (W 86)	1 (B 90)	7½	115½	116½	2061
78	(Ukraine) Evgeniya Doluhanova	2145	0 (B 17)	0 (B 2)	1 (W 87)	1 (W 38)	0 (B 18)	0 (W 66)	(B 89)	1 (W 84)	0 (B 75)	½ (W 79)	1 (B 88)	1 (W 95)	0 (B 16)	0 (W 52)	½ (B 65)	0 (W 58)	½ (B 82)	7	134	140	2067
79	(Poland) Emilia Dylag	1863	1 (B 70)	0 (W 69)	½ (W 33)	1 (B 51)	0 (W 36)	0 (B 74)	0 (W 32)	0 (B 56)	1 (W 97)	½ (B 78)	1 (B 76)	½ (W 71)	½ (W 54)	0 (B 45)	1 (W 81)	0 (B 62)	0 (W 67)	7	130½	136½	2176
80	(Poland) Alicja Śliwicka	2155	0 (B 11)	1 (W 91)	0 (B 17)	1 (W 75)	0 (B 44)	0 (W 84)	1 (B 102)	1 (W 95)	0 (B 13)	0 (B 74)	0 (W 87)	1 (W 82)	0 (B 52)	½ (W 58)	½ (B 97)	1 (W 96)	0 (B 65)	7	127½	133½	2086
81	Alisa Nur-Mukhametova	2065	0 (B 38)	1 (W 44)	0 (B 31)	0 (W 13)	0 (B 75)	1 (W 103)	0 (W 45)	1 (B 59)	0 (W 87)	1 (B 91)	(1 B 58)	0 (W 74)	0 (B 66)	1 (W 95)	0 (B 79)	0 (W 85)	1 (B 94)	7	127	128	2033
82	(Poland) Barbara Goraj	1902	1 (B 66)	0 (W 37)	1 (B 18)	0 (W 19)	0 (B 70)	0 (W 86)	0 (B 38)	0 (W 102)	1 (W 92)	0 (B 97)	1 (W 100)	0 (B 80)	1 (W 84)	1 (B 83)	0 (W 67)	½ (B 88)	½ (W 78)	7	124	129	2131
83	(Spain) Sonia Gil Quilez	2102	0 (B 19)	0 (B 12)	1 (W 85)	0 (W 18)	0 (B 84)	1 (W 100)	1 (B 77)	0 (W 37)	0 (B 58)	½ (W 89)	1 (B 90)	0 (W 75)	½ (B 96)	0 (W 82)	0 (W 94)	1 (B 104)	1 (W 97)	7	122	123	2016
84	(Poland) Marta Bartel	1920	1 (W 43)	0 (B 22)	0 (W 55)	0 (B 62)	1 (W 83)	1 (B 80)	0 (W 25)	0 (B 78)	0 (W 42)	1 (B 100)	0 (B 71)	0 (W 76)	0 (B 82)	1 (W 104)	0 (B 75)	1 (W 101)	1 (B 95)	7	120½	121½	2087
85	(Poland) Maria Malicka	1903	0 (B 15)	0 (W 66)	0 (B 83)	1 (W 104)	0 (B 38)	0 (W 76)	1 (B 103)	½ (W 98)	½ (B 89)	1 (W 102)	1 (W 67)	0 (W 45)	0 (B 64)	1 (W 96)	0 (B 44)	1 (B 81)	0 (W 68)	7	117	118	2050
86	Galina Strutinskaya	2188	0 (W 92)	0 (B 89)	1 (W 56)	0 (B 88)	1 (W 59)	1 (B 82)	1 (B 34)	0 (W 19)	0 (B 10)	1 (W 71)	½ (B 38)	0 (W 47)	0 (B 41)	0 (W 65)	0 (B 90)	0 (B 77)	1 (W 103)	6½	131½	132½	2037
87	Ekaterina Smirnova	1925	0 (B 69)	0 (W 13)	0 (B 78)	½ (W 91)	1 (B 58)	1 (W 98)	½ (B 51)	0 (W 99)	1 (B 81)	0 (W 53)	1 (B 80)	1 (W 66)	0 (B 37)	0 (W 64)	½ (B 59)	0 (W 57)	0 (B 75)	6½	130½	136½	2125
88	(Poland) Honorata Kucharska	1910	1 (B 13)	0 (W 4)	0 (B 99)	1 (W 86)	0 (B 22)	1 (W 38)	0 (B 66)	0 (W 64)	1 (B 90)	0 (B 42)	0 (W 78)	0 (W 96)	0 (B 59)	1 (W 101)	1 (B 104)	(W 82)	0 (B 74)	6½	130	131	2147
89	(Poland) Wiktoria Smietanska	1765	0 (B 46)	1 (W 86)	1 (B 13)	0 (W 99)	0 (B 73)	0 (W 64)	½ (W 78)	0 (B 76)	½ (W 85)	½ (B 83)	1 (W 97)	0 (B 53)	1 (B 90)	0 (W 34)	0 (B 57)	0 (W 94)	1 (W 104)	6½	124½	125½	2158
90	(Kazakhstan) Nazerke Nurgali	2111	½ (W 29)	0 (B 41)	0 (W 10)	0 (B 47)	1 (B 100)	1 (W 91)	0 (W 55)	0 (B 65)	0 (W 88)	1 (B 92)	0 (W 83)	1 (B 93)	0 (W 89)	1 (B 94)	1 (W 86)	0 (B 63)	0 (W 77)	6½	123	128	2010
91	(Poland) Pola Parol	1823	0 (W 73)	0 (B 80)	0 (W 40)	½ (B 87)	1 (W 56)	0 (B 90)	0 (B 65)	1 (W 101)	1 (B 98)	0 (W 81)	0 (B 54)	1 (W 97)	1 (B 57)	0 (W 46)	0 (B 58)	1 (W 93)	0 (B 76)	6½	120½	125	2079
92	(Israel) Michelle Katkov	1651	1 (B 86)	0 (W 15)	1 (B 66)	0 (W 69)	(0 B 29)	½ (W 57)	0 (B 63)	0 (W 54)	0 (B 82)	0 (W 90)	1 (B 104)	1 (W 94)	0 (B 46)	0 (W 97)	1 (B 103)	0 (W 76)	1 (B 101)	6½	115	116	2118
93	(Poland) Magdalena Budkiewicz	1624	0 (B 26)	0 (W 27)	0 (B 67)	1 (W 102)	0 (B 66)	0 (B 56)	0 (W 59)	1 (W 103)	1 (B 101)	0 (W 76)	½ (B 96)	0 (W 90)	1 (B 104)	0 (W 57)	1 (B 98)	0 (B 91)	1 (W 100)	6½	110½	111½	1978
94	(Poland) Michalina Rudzińska	1832	0 (B 28)	0 (W 70)	0 (B 54)	0 (W 98)	½ (B 101)	1 (B 104)	0 (W 56)	0 (W 58)	0 (B 59)	1 (W 103)	1 (B 77)	0 (B 92)	1 (W 100)	0 (W 90)	1 (B 83)	1 (B 89)	0 (W 81)	6½	108½	109½	1921
95	(Poland) Liwia Jarocka	1851	0 (W 6)	1 (B 62)	½ (W 35)	0 (B 11)	1 (W 47)	0 (W 13)	½ (B 57)	0 (B 80)	1 (W 76)	1 (B 64)	0 (W 49)	0 (B 78)	0 (W 67)	0 (B 81)	0 (W 77)	1 (B 100)	0 (W 84)	6	136	141	2142
96	(Poland) Anna Jakubowska	1980	0 (B 37)	0 (W 18)	1 (B 104)	½ (W 46)	0 (B 54)	0 (W 51)	½ (B 58)	1 (W 77)	0 (B 67)	0 (W 59)	½ (W 93)	1 (B 88)	½ (W 83)	0 (B 85)	1 (W 100)	0 (B 80)	0 (B 98)	6	123	124	1978
97	(Czech Republic) Julia Movsesian	2354	0 (B 48)	1 (W 67)	0 (B 63)	½ (W 54)	1 (B 65)	0 (W 46)	0 (B 52)	0 (W 75)	0 (B 79)	1 (W 82)	0 (B 89)	0 (B 91)	1 (W 103)	1 (B 92)	½ (W 80)	0 (W 59)	0 (b 83)	6	122	123	1953
98	(Slovenia) Spela Kolaric	2056	0 (W 14)	0 (B 74)	0 (W 59)	1 (B 94)	0 (W 57)	0 (B 87)	1 (W 100)	½ (B 85)	0 (W 91)	½ (B 101)	0 (W 56)	1 (W 104)	0 (B 58)	0 (B 77)	0 (W 93)	1 (B 103)	1 (W 96)	6	108½	109½	1898
99	(Iran) Atousa Pourkashiyan	2285	½ (W 41)	½ (B 10)	1 (W 88)	1 (B 89)	0 (W 30)	0 (B 39)	0 (W 40)	1 (B 87)	1 (W 62)	0 (B 21)	0 (-)	0 (-)	0 (-)	0 (-)	0 (-)	0 (-)	0 (-)	5	131	137	2043
100	(Poland) Weronika Zabzanska	1596	0 (W 42)	1 (B 53)	0 (W 73)	0 (B 32)	0 (W 90)	0 (B 83)	0 (B 98)	1 (W 104)	1 (B 77)	0 (W 84)	0 (B 82)	1 (W 101)	0 (B 94)	1 (W 103)	0 (B 96)	0 (W 95)	0 (B 93)	5	106	107	1968
101	(Ecuador) Carla Heredia Serrano	2092	0 (B 23)	0 (W 20)	0 (B 75)	0 (B 29)	½ (W 94)	0 (W 58)	1 (B 104)	0 (B 91)	0 (W 93)	½ (W 98)	1 (B 103)	0 (B 100)	1 (W 77)	0 (B 88)	½ (W 76)	0 (B 84)	0 (W 92)	4½	112	113	1921
102	Irina Utiatskaja	1935	0 (W 55)	0 (B 33)	0 (W 62)	0 (B 93)	1 (W 104)	1 (B 59)	0 (W 80)	1 (B 82)	0 (W 45)	0 (B 85)	0 (-)	0 (-)	0 (-)	0 (-)	0 (-)	0 (-)	0 (-)	3	110	111	1979
103	(Brazil) Cibele Florencio Da Silva	1412	1 (-)	0 (W 28)	0 (B 70)	0 (W 64)	0 (B 67)	0 (B 81)	0 (W 85)	0 (B 93)	½ (W 104)	0 (B 94)	0 (W 101)	0 (W 77)	0 (B 97)	0 (B 100)	0 (W 92)	0 (W 98)	0 (B 86)	1½	109½	110½	1960
104	(Brazil) Renee Blandy T. Brambilla	1651	0 (W 45)	0 (B 32)	0 (W 96)	0 (B 85)	0 (B 102)	0 (W 94)	0 (W 101)	0 (B 100)	½ (B 103)	½ (W 77)	0 (W 92)	0 (B 98)	0 (W 93)	0 (B 84)	0 (W 88)	0 (W 83)	0 (B 89)	1	107½	108½	1900
105	(Lithuania) Salomėja Zaksaitė	2002	0 (B 16)	0 (-)	0 (-)	0 (-)	0 (-)	0 (-)	0 (-)	0 (-)	0 (-)	0 (-)	0 (-)	0 (-)	0 (-)	0 (-)	0 (-)	0 (-)	0 (-)	0	84	85	0
