= Li Min Peng =

Ukrainian-Swiss chess grandmaster (born 1997)

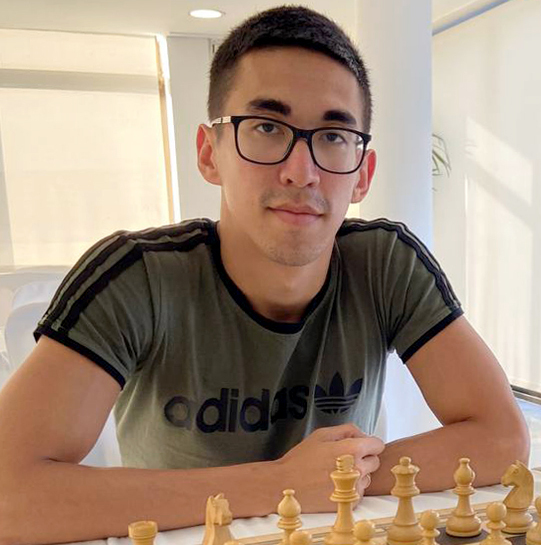
- Peng in 2022

Personal information
- Born: January 15, 1997 (age 29) Mykolaiv, Ukraine

Chess career
- Country: Ukraine (until 2024); Switzerland (since 2024)
- Title: Grandmaster (2022)
- FIDE rating: 2529 (July 2026)
- Peak rating: 2575 (January 2024)

Li Min Peng is a Ukrainian chess grandmaster who plays for Switzerland.

== Chess career ==
In December 2021, Peng competed in the World Rapid and Blitz Chess Championships. In the Rapid portion, he finished 157th out of 176 players. In the Blitz portion, he finished 144th out of 179 players.

In June 2022, Peng won the Challenge portion (exclusive to players rated above 1600) of the Davos Chess Open 2022, with a score of 6.5/7.

In November 2022, Peng won in the Category A section (the category with the highest-rated players) of the Lucerne Open, where he remained undefeated.

In January 2023, Peng finished tied for first place with Read Samadov in the Basel Christmas Chess Festival, but ended up losing the championship after being defeated in the tiebreakers.

In June 2023, Peng, playing for the CHF Bad Emstal club, won the 13th Rhineland-Palatinate Open by defeating Bernhard Stillger.

In March 2024, Peng transferred federations from Ukraine to Switzerland.

== Personal life ==
Peng was educated at the Admiral Makarov National University of Shipbuilding.
