= Khazar Babazada =

Azerbaijani chess player (born 2005)

- Babazada in 2026

Personal information
- Born: Xəzər Babazadə; 12 March 2005 (age 21) Baku, Azerbaijan

Chess career
- Country: Azerbaijan
- Title: International Master (2022)
- FIDE rating: 2489 (September 2026)
- Peak rating: 2509 (November 2025)

Khazar Babazada (Azerbaijani: Xəzər Babazadə) is an Azerbaijani chess player, international master (since 2022). According to the March 2023 ranking, he was ranked 19th among Azerbaijani chess players, 853rd among world chess players, and 66th in the "Top 100 Juniors" ranking.

== Early life ==
Khazar Babazada was born on March 12, 2005, in Baku. He started playing chess at the age of 5. He studied at full secondary school number 269 in Baku.

== Career ==
In August 2017, he won the 24th Abu Dhabi International Chess Festival, a Junior Tournament held in Abu Dhabi, the capital of the UAE.

In August 2017, he was awarded first place in the tournament with 8.5/9 points in the international competition dedicated to the memory of Grandmaster Vugar Gashimov.

In 2019, Babazada was awarded the title of FIDE Master (FM) by FIDE.

In December 2020, Babazade announced "Karabakh is Azerbaijan!" won the tournament with 8.5/11 points in the online international chess tournament. In this tournament, he managed to surpass the grandmaster Nodirbek Abdusattorov with the same score in additional indicators.

In September 2022, he finished the tournament in the 6th place with a score of 7.5/11 at the Under-18 World Championship in Mamaia, Romania.

In November 2022, at the European Under-18 Championship in Antalya, Türkiye, he placed 3–8 with 6.5/9 points and finished the tournament in 7th place according to additional indicators.

In 2022, Babazade was awarded the title of International Master (IM) on the FIDE side.

In September 2023, Babazade won the silver medal at the Under-18 European Chess Championship held in Mamaia, Romania.

== Personal life ==
In March 2023, Khazar Babazada announced the NFT cooperation in the chess industry with a blockchain-based company.
