= 77th Russian Chess Championship =

Tournament information
- Location: Barnaul, Russia
- Date: 16–29 August 2024
- Format: Single round-robin (11 rounds); 90/40 + 30 + 30" (increment from move 1)
- Venue: Barnaul (Altai Territory)
- Participants: 12 (open) + 12 (women)

Final positions
- Champion: Open: Vladislav Artemiev (playoff winner); Women: Kateryna Lagno

'The 77th edition of the Russian Chess Championship (Russian: 77-й чемпионат России по шахматам), also known as the Superfinal of the 77th Russian Championship, was a chess tournament held in Barnaul, Altai Territory, Russia, from 16 to 29 August 2024.

It was an 11-round single round-robin featuring 12 players in the open section and served as the premier domestic chess championship of Russia for 2024.

Vladislav Artemiev and Andrey Esipenko both scored 7/11. Artemiev defended his title by winning the rapid playoff 2–0. The 74th Russian Women's Chess Championship was held concurrently and won by Kateryna Lagno.

== Open section ==
=== Final crosstable ===
Pos	Player	Title	Rating	1	2	3	4	5	6	7	8	9	10	11	12	Pts	TPR
1–2	Vladislav Artemiev	GM	2699	*	½	½	½	½	1	½	½	½	1	½	½	7	2713
1–2	Andrey Esipenko	GM	2671	½	*	½	½	1	½	½	½	½	½	1	½	7	2715
3	Daniil Dubov	GM	2701	½	½	*	½	½	½	½	½	½	½	1	½	6	2646
4	Evgeniy Najer	GM	2635	½	½	½	*	½	½	½	½	½	½	1	½	6	2652
5	Arseniy Nesterov	GM	2592	½	0	½	½	*	½	½	1	½	½	1	½	6	2656
6	Aleksey Grebnev	GM	2513	0	½	½	½	½	*	½	½	½	½	1	½	5½	2628
7	Rudik Makarian	IM	2537	½	½	½	½	½	½	*	½	½	½	½	½	5½	2625
8	Aleksey Dreev	GM	2591	½	½	½	½	0	½	½	*	½	½	½	½	5	2584
9	Alexander Grischuk	GM	2708	½	½	½	½	½	½	½	½	*	½	½	½	5	2574
10	Maxim Matlakov	GM	2651	0	½	½	½	½	½	½	½	½	*	½	½	4½	2550
11	Artyom Timofeev	GM	2547	½	0	0	0	0	0	½	½	½	½	*	1	4½	2559
12	Pavel Ponkratov	GM	2571	½	½	½	½	½	½	½	½	½	½	0	*	4	2520

=== Schedule and results by round ===
Round 1 (17 August 2024)

White	Black	Result	Moves	ECO	Opening
Artemiev, Vladislav	Najer, Evgeniy	½–½	27	A06	Réti Opening
Makarian, Rudik	Dubov, Daniil	½–½	20	D43	Semi-Slav Defence
Grebnev, Aleksey	Matlakov, Maxim	½–½	18	E06	Catalan Opening
Esipenko, Andrey	Ponkratov, Pavel	½–½	22	C87	Ruy Lopez
Grischuk, Alexander	Timofeev, Artyom	1–0	88	B90	Sicilian Najdorf
Dreev, Aleksey	Nesterov, Arseniy	½–½	24	D02	Queen's Pawn Game

Round 2 (18 August 2024)

White	Black	Result	Moves	ECO	Opening
Artemiev, Vladislav	Makarian, Rudik	½–½	60	B40	Sicilian Defence
Timofeev, Artyom	Dreev, Aleksey	½–½	14	B12	Caro-Kann Defence
Ponkratov, Pavel	Grischuk, Alexander	½–½	25	C67	Ruy Lopez Berlin
Matlakov, Maxim	Esipenko, Andrey	½–½	26	C67	Ruy Lopez Berlin
Dubov, Daniil	Grebnev, Aleksey	½–½	13	C43	Petrov's Defence
Najer, Evgeniy	Nesterov, Arseniy	½–½	20	D03	Queen's Pawn Game

Round 3 (19 August 2024)

White	Black	Result	Moves	ECO	Opening
Grischuk, Alexander	Matlakov, Maxim	½–½	28	A45	Queen's Pawn Game
Esipenko, Andrey	Dubov, Daniil	½–½	41	C67	Ruy Lopez Berlin
Nesterov, Arseniy	Artemiev, Vladislav	½–½	32	D38	QGD Ragozin
Makarian, Rudik	Timofeev, Artyom	½–½	19	D11	Slav Defence
Grebnev, Aleksey	Najer, Evgeniy	½–½	22	E06	Catalan Opening
Ponkratov, Pavel	Dreev, Aleksey	½–½	17	C88	Ruy Lopez

Round 4 (20 August 2024)

White	Black	Result	Moves	ECO	Opening
Dubov, Daniil	Grischuk, Alexander	½–½	25	D11	Slav Defence
Artemiev, Vladislav	Esipenko, Andrey	½–½	41	D38	QGD Ragozin
Timofeev, Artyom	Grebnev, Aleksey	½–½	30	B30	Sicilian Rossolimo
Matlakov, Maxim	Ponkratov, Pavel	½–½	24	D37	Queen's Gambit Declined
Najer, Evgeniy	Makarian, Rudik	½–½	21	D31	Semi-Slav Defence
Dreev, Aleksey	Nesterov, Arseniy	½–½	18	A07	Barcza System

Round 5 (21 August 2024)

White	Black	Result	Moves	ECO	Opening
Grischuk, Alexander	Artemiev, Vladislav	½–½	32	C53	Giuoco Piano
Esipenko, Andrey	Timofeev, Artyom	1–0	45	C42	Petroff's Defence
Nesterov, Arseniy	Dubov, Daniil	½–½	28	D86	Grünfeld Defence
Makarian, Rudik	Grebnev, Aleksey	½–½	35	D35	QGD Exchange
Ponkratov, Pavel	Najer, Evgeniy	½–½	19	C67	Ruy Lopez Berlin
Matlakov, Maxim	Dreev, Aleksey	½–½	22	D37	Queen's Gambit Declined

Round 6 (22 August 2024)

White	Black	Result	Moves	ECO	Opening
Artemiev, Vladislav	Ponkratov, Pavel	1–0	52	A13	Réti Opening
Grischuk, Alexander	Nesterov, Arseniy	½–½	30	A15	English Opening
Dubov, Daniil	Makarian, Rudik	½–½	41	C67	Ruy Lopez Berlin
Esipenko, Andrey	Grebnev, Aleksey	½–½	36	C88	Ruy Lopez
Timofeev, Artyom	Matlakov, Maxim	½–½	25	B30	Sicilian
Najer, Evgeniy	Dreev, Aleksey	½–½	28	D31	Semi-Slav

Round 7 (24 August 2024)

White	Black	Result	Moves	ECO	Opening
Nesterov, Arseniy	Esipenko, Andrey	½–½	33	D38	QGD Ragozin
Artemiev, Vladislav	Grischuk, Alexander	½–½	29	D31	Semi-Slav
Grebnev, Aleksey	Dubov, Daniil	½–½	24	E06	Catalan
Makarian, Rudik	Najer, Evgeniy	½–½	21	D35	QGD Exchange
Ponkratov, Pavel	Timofeev, Artyom	½–½	18	C45	Scotch Game
Matlakov, Maxim	Dreev, Aleksey	½–½	26	D37	Queen's Gambit Declined

Round 8 (25 August 2024)

White	Black	Result	Moves	ECO	Opening
Grischuk, Alexander	Nesterov, Arseniy	½–½	41	A15	English
Esipenko, Andrey	Makarian, Rudik	½–½	37	C88	Ruy Lopez
Dubov, Daniil	Artemiev, Vladislav	½–½	32	D31	Semi-Slav
Timofeev, Artyom	Najer, Evgeniy	½–½	22	B30	Sicilian
Grebnev, Aleksey	Ponkratov, Pavel	½–½	19	E06	Catalan
Dreev, Aleksey	Matlakov, Maxim	½–½	24	A07	Barcza System

Round 9 (26 August 2024)

White	Black	Result	Moves	ECO	Opening
Artemiev, Vladislav	Timofeev, Artyom	1–0	48	A13	Réti Opening
Nesterov, Arseniy	Grebnev, Aleksey	1–0	52	D86	Grünfeld Defence
Makarian, Rudik	Grischuk, Alexander	½–½	25	D11	Slav Defence
Ponkratov, Pavel	Dubov, Daniil	½–½	30	C67	Ruy Lopez Berlin
Najer, Evgeniy	Esipenko, Andrey	½–½	28	D31	Semi-Slav
Matlakov, Maxim	Dreev, Aleksey	½–½	22	D37	Queen's Gambit Declined

Round 10 (27 August 2024)

White	Black	Result	Moves	ECO	Opening
Grischuk, Alexander	Artemiev, Vladislav	½–½	35	C53	Giuoco Piano
Esipenko, Andrey	Nesterov, Arseniy	½–½	41	C42	Petroff's Defence
Dubov, Daniil	Najer, Evgeniy	½–½	29	D11	Slav Defence
Timofeev, Artyom	Makarian, Rudik	½–½	24	B30	Sicilian
Grebnev, Aleksey	Matlakov, Maxim	½–½	26	E06	Catalan
Dreev, Aleksey	Ponkratov, Pavel	½–½	19	A07	Barcza System

Round 11 (28 August 2024)

White	Black	Result	Moves	ECO	Opening
Artemiev, Vladislav	Esipenko, Andrey	½–½	41	D38	QGD Ragozin
Nesterov, Arseniy	Dubov, Daniil	½–½	33	D86	Grünfeld Defence
Makarian, Rudik	Grebnev, Aleksey	½–½	28	D11	Slav Defence
Ponkratov, Pavel	Najer, Evgeniy	½–½	25	C67	Ruy Lopez Berlin
Matlakov, Maxim	Timofeev, Artyom	½–½	22	D37	Queen's Gambit Declined
Dreev, Aleksey	Grischuk, Alexander	½–½	30	A07	Barcza System

Artemiev and Esipenko tied for first on 7/11. Artemiev won the rapid playoff 2–0 to defend his title.

== Women's section ==
The 74th Russian Women's Chess Championship was held concurrently in Barnaul. Kateryna Lagno won the title with 7/11 points.

== Prize fund ==
The prize fund for the open section was approximately 7 million RUB.
