= World Blitz Chess Championship =

Chess tournament

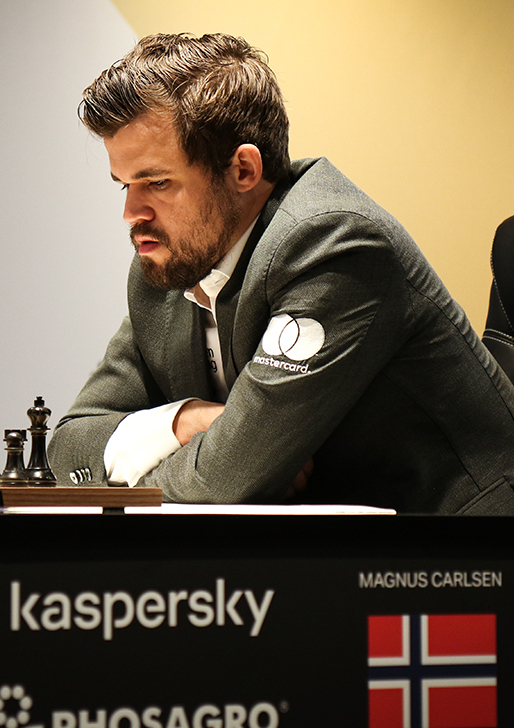
Current World Blitz Champion, Magnus Carlsen

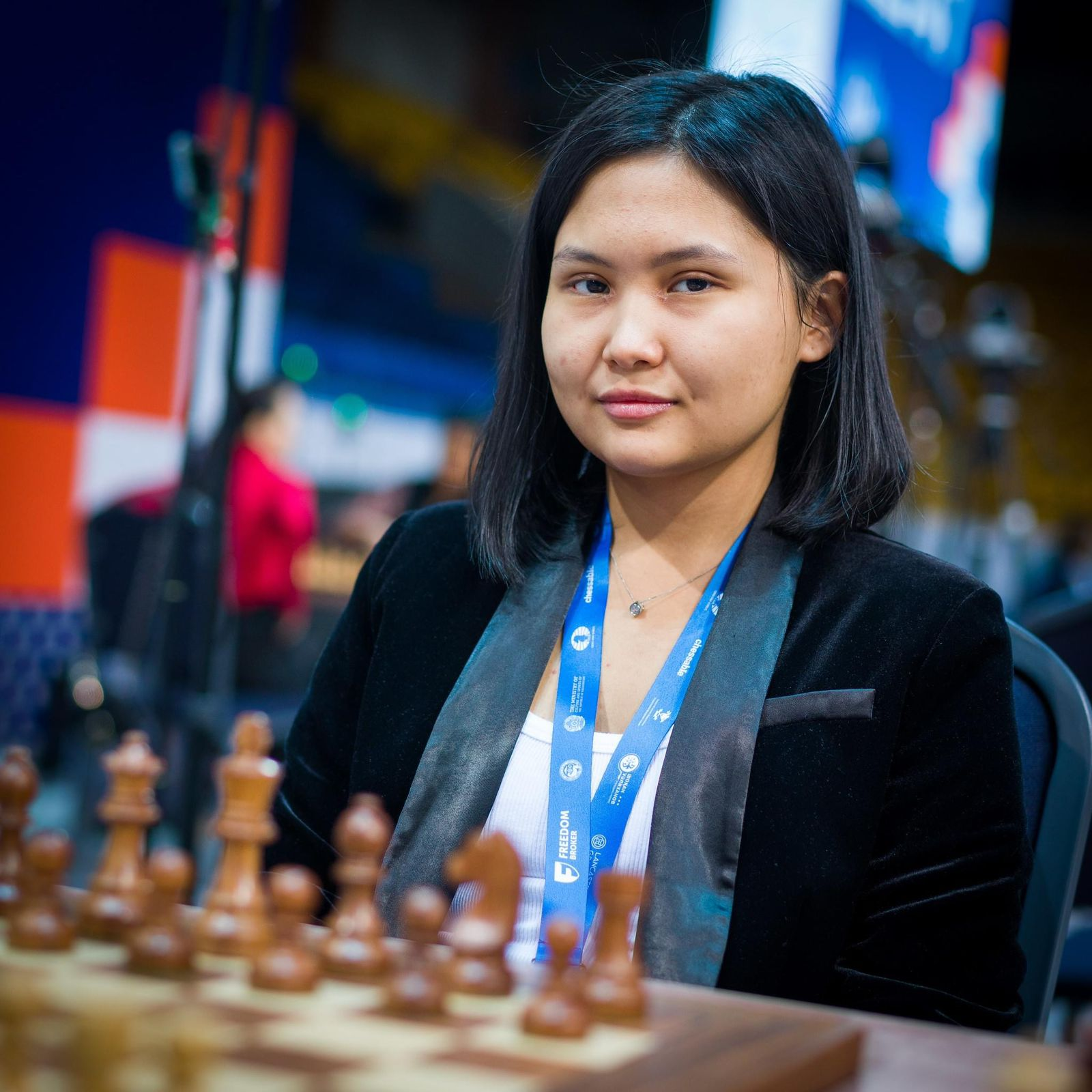
Current Women's World Blitz Chess Champion, Bibisara Assaubayeva

The World Blitz Chess Championship is a chess tournament held to determine the world champion in chess played under blitz time controls. Since 2012, FIDE has held an annual joint rapid and blitz chess tournament and billed it as the World Rapid & Blitz Chess Championships. The current world blitz champion is the Norwegian Grandmaster Magnus Carlsen. Grandmaster Bibisara Assaubayeva from Kazakhstan is the current women's blitz world champion. Magnus Carlsen has held the title a record nine times.

== Time controls ==
For most championships up to 2008, the time limit was 5 minutes per game. Since the 2009 championships, the time limit has been 3 minutes plus a 2 second increment per move.

== Early events ==
=== Herceg Novi Blitz Tournament of 1970 ===
On 8 April 1970, following the USSR vs. Rest of the World 'Match of the Century' hosted in Belgrade, Yugoslavia, a blitz tournament was held in Herceg Novi, featuring many of the same participants from the match. The event was a 12-player double round-robin, with no tiebreaks and five minutes per player. Featuring four World Champions, the field was considered the strongest of any blitz tournament in modern history. Heading into the event, two-time World Champion Tigran Petrosian was considered the favorite to win the event, with Mikhail Tal and Viktor Korchnoi also enjoying favorable chances.

It was American grandmaster Bobby Fischer, however, who put up a dominant performance, scoring 19/22 to win the tournament by 4½ points. Fischer scored 8½/10 against the five Soviet grandmasters in attendance, losing only one game in the entire tournament and frequently gaining huge time advantages. According to one report, Fischer spent no more than 2.5 minutes on any game. At the end of the tournament, runner-up Tal gave his thoughts on the American's performance.

"I don't know what Petrosian, Korchnoi, Bronstein, and Smyslov counted on before the start of the tournament, but I expected them to be the most probable rivals for the top prizes. Fischer had until recently played fast chess none too strongly. Now much has changed: he is fine at fast chess. His playing is of the same kind as in tournament games: everything is simple, follows a single pattern, logical, and without any spectacular effects. He makes his moves quickly and practically without errors. Throughout the tournament I think he did not lose a whole set of pieces in this way. Fischer's result is very, very impressive."

Rk	Player	Rtg	Pts
1	Bobby Fischer (USA)	2720	19
2	Mikhail Tal (URS)	2590	14½
3	Viktor Korchnoi (URS)	2670	14
4	Tigran Petrosian (URS)	2650	13½
5	David Bronstein (URS)	2570	13
6	Vlastimil Hort (CSR)	2610	12
7	Milan Matulović (YUG)	2560	10½
8	Vasily Smyslov (URS)	2620	9½
9	Samuel Reshevsky (USA)	2590	8½
10	Wolfgang Uhlmann (GDR)	2570	8
11	Borislav Ivkov (YUG)	2570	7½
12	Predrag Ostojić (YUG)	2430	2

=== 1988 World Blitz Championship ===
Following the Candidates' matches for the 1988 cycle, a World Blitz Championship was hosted in Saint John, New Brunswick, Canada, on 19 February 1988. The event was a 32-player single-elimination tournament, with pairings determined by best-of-four matches. The field was headlined by long-time rivals Garry Kasparov and Anatoly Karpov, with the former considered the favorite to win the tournament. Notable participants included:

1. Garry Kasparov (URS), 2750
2. Anatoly Karpov (URS), 2715
3. Mikhail Tal (URS), 2630
4. Rafael Vaganian (URS), 2625
5. Jon Speelman (ENG), 2625
6. Artur Yusupov (URS), 2620
7. Yasser Seirawan (USA), 2595
8. Kiril Georgiev (BUL), 2595
9. Valery Salov (URS), 2595
10. Jaan Ehlvest (URS), 2585
11. Kevin Spraggett (CAN), 2580
12. Alexander Chernin (URS), 2560
13. Jesús Nogueiras (CUB), 2560
14. Maxim Dlugy (USA), 2550
15. Margeir Pétursson (ISL), 2540
16. Michael Wilder (USA), 2535
17. Roman Dzindzichashvili (URS), 2530
18. Branko Damljanović (YUG), 2525
19. Helgi Ólafsson (ISL), 2510
20. Igor Ivanov (CAN), 2505
21. Aivars Gipslis (URS), 2505
22. Attila Grószpéter (HUN), 2495
23. Bogdan Lalić (YUG), 2495
24. Joseph Gallagher (ENG), 2480

Former world champion Anatoly Karpov fell out of contention for the championship in just the second round, after dropping his first two games against fellow Soviet grandmaster Alexander Chernin. Reigning world champion Garry Kasparov steamed ahead into the quarterfinals but lost momentum after missing an elementary mate in two against Bulgarian grandmaster Kiril Georgiev, instead blundering stalemate; a stunned Kasparov was subsequently knocked out of the tournament. In the final, Mikhail Tal clinched the championship with a 3½–½ victory over Armenian grandmaster Rafael Vaganian.

Quarterfinals
(Soviet Union) Garry Kasparov	1
(Bulgaria) Kiril Georgiev	3
(Soviet Union) Rafael Vaganian	3
(United States) Michael Wilder	0
(Soviet Union) Jaan Ehlvest	1
(Soviet Union) Alexander Chernin	3
(Soviet Union) Mikhail Tal	3
(Soviet Union) Artur Jussupow	0

Semifinals
(Bulgaria) Kiril Georgiev	3½
(Soviet Union) Rafael Vaganian	4½
(Soviet Union) Alexander Chernin	1½
(Soviet Union) Mikhail Tal	2½

Final
(Soviet Union) Rafael Vaganian	½
(Soviet Union) Mikhail Tal	3½

Mikhail Tal, the 51-year-old former World Champion, breezed through the final rounds with 5½/7. Joining him in the finals was Rafael Vaganian, who survived a controversial semifinal against Kiril Georgiev; the Armenian nearly punched his clock after making an illegal move in Game 2, an accusation that was eventually refuted after match officials resorted to a video review and found that Vaganian's hand had stopped just short of touching the clock. The final was a one-sided affair, with Tal repeatedly utilizing exchange sacrifices to find winning combinations; down 3–0 after three games, Vaganian offered his hand in the 4th game to concede the match to Tal. After the match, Tal claimed he took the event "none too seriously"; he chain-smoked throughout the tournament, and his "preparation" for the semifinal match against Chernin reportedly consisted of a double scotch.

1988 World Blitz Championship – Final
Name	Rating	1	2	3	4	Total
Mikhail Tal (URS)	2630	1	1	1	½	3½
Rafael Vaganian (URS)	2625	0	0	0	½	½

=== 2000 World Blitz Chess Cup ===
The Plus GSM World Blitz Cup was a 367-player Swiss-system tournament held in Warsaw, Poland, on 9 January 2000. Hosted at the Warsaw Polonia Chess Club, the event consisted of 11 rounds, with each match comprising two 5-minute games for a total of 22 games per player. Indian grandmaster Vishwanathan Anand, the tournament's No. 1 seed, triumphed over a strong field that included 70 Grandmasters and nine of the world's top-20 ranked players with a 17½/22 score. Anand's run saw him pick up 14 wins, 7 draws, and only 1 loss, highlighted by a 43-move win with the black pieces against Anatoly Karpov. The tournament's sponsor, Plus GSM, set aside a $30,500 prize fund for the event as well as Nokia mobile communicators to be given to the top four finishers and the two top Polish players.

Karpov vs. Anand, World Blitz Cup

Position: c8 black rook, g8 black king, b7 black rook, g7 black pawn, h7 black pawn, f6 black pawn, c5 black bishop, d5 white pawn, e5 white pawn, f4 white pawn, b3 black pawn, c3 black pawn, g3 white pawn, e2 white rook, f2 white rook, g2 white king, h2 white pawn, c1 white bishop

Final position

Rk	Player	Rtg	Pts	TB1	TB2	TB3
1	Viswanathan Anand (IND)	2769	17½	137½	166	114½
2	Boris Gelfand (ISR)	2692	17	136½	166	110
3	Anatoly Karpov (RUS)	2696	17	136	164	114½
4	Vladimir Akopian (ARM)	2660	17	132½	160½	108
5	Vasyl Ivanchuk (UKR)	2709	17	132	160	105½
6	Michael Adams (ENG)	2715	17	129	154	102½
7	Vladimir Epishin (RUS)	2667	17	125½	152½	104
8	Vladislav Tkachiev (FRA)	2670	16½	134½	164	107½
9	Zdenko Kožul (CRO)	2597	16½	133	160	105½
10	Peter Svidler (RUS)	2672	16½	132½	162	107½
11	Alexei Shirov (ESP)	2751	16½	132½	160	109½
12	Andrei Shchekachev (RUS)	2509	16½	128½	157½	101
13	Mikulas Manik (SVK)	2469	16½	128	156	104
14	Rafael Vaganian (ARM)	2618	16½	125½	153	99
15	Robert Kempiński (POL)	2528	16½	125½	149½	102
16	Alexey Korotylev (RUS)	2477	16½	122	150½	103
17	Kiril Georgiev (BUL)	2677	16	134½	161	105
18	Aleksej Aleksandrov (BLR)	2606	16	124	152½	104
19	Sergey Kasparov (BLR)	2465	16	123	150½	96½
20	Paweł Blehm (POL)	2494	16	123	149	101½

== FIDE-recognized events ==
=== FIDE World Blitz Championship (2006–2010) ===
The first blitz chess tournament to be recognized by FIDE as a "world championship" took place on 6 September 2006 in Rishon Lezion, Israel. Structured as a 16-player round-robin, the tournament featured seven of the world's top 20 Grandmasters, as well as a young Magnus Carlsen. After 15 rounds, Alexander Grischuk and Peter Svidler finished atop the leaderboard with 10½/15; Grischuk subsequently defeated Svidler with Black in an armageddon game to win the championship.

In 2007, the tournament (now branded as the FIDE World Blitz Cup) was held in Moscow, Russia following the Tal Memorial tournament and was re-structured as a 20-player double-round robin with a significantly stronger field. After Ukrainian grandmaster Vasyl Ivanchuk and Indian grandmaster Viswanathan Anand entered the final round tied on points, Ivanchuk defeated Anand from a disadvantaged position to win the tournament with 25½/38.

In 2008, the tournament was dubbed the IV World Blitz 2008. It reverted to a 16-player round-robin, and the time limit was 5 minutes per game. Despite a late charge from the defending champion Ivanchuk, who won seven of the final eight rounds, the tournament was won by Leinier Domínguez, a 25-year-old GM from Cuba who scored 11½/15 to edge out Ivanchuk by a half-point.

In 2009, the championship returned to Moscow, where the format was once again switched to a 22-player double round-robin with revised time controls of 3 minutes per player plus a 2-second increment. The event was won by the young Norwegian chess prodigy Magnus Carlsen, who finished three points clear of the field with 31/42 and went 8/8 against the 2nd through 5th-place finishers.

2010 would prove to be the final year of the event – hosted again in Moscow, the tournament was dubbed the VI World Blitz 2010 and held immediately after the Tal Memorial tournament. Despite losing both his final games, Armenian Grandmaster Levon Aronian was able to clinch the title with 24½/38, half a point ahead of Teimour Radjabov. In November 2010, a nine-round Swiss tournament was scheduled for February 17, 2011, to serve as a qualifying event for the World Blitz Championship 2011; however, after no bids for the event were made the tournament was eventually cancelled.

==== Editions and medallists ====
Year	Host city	Champion	Runner-up	Third place
2006	(Israel) Rishon Lezion	Alexander Grischuk (RUS)	Peter Svidler (RUS)	Teimour Radjabov (AZE)
2007	(Russia) Moscow	Vasyl Ivanchuk (UKR)	Viswanathan Anand (IND)	Alexander Grischuk (RUS)
2008	(Kazakhstan) Almaty	Leinier Domínguez (CUB)	Vasyl Ivanchuk (UKR)	Peter Svidler (RUS)
2009	(Russia) Moscow	Magnus Carlsen (NOR)	Viswanathan Anand (IND)	Sergey Karjakin (RUS)
2010	(Russia) Moscow	Levon Aronian (ARM)	Teimour Radjabov (AZE)	Magnus Carlsen (NOR)

=== World Rapid & Blitz Chess Championships (since 2012) ===
On May 31, 2012, FIDE announced the inaugural World Rapid & Blitz Championships, set to take place in Astana, Kazakhstan, from July 1 to 11. The 2012 tournament consisted of a qualifying round, followed by the rapid and blitz events held consecutively over five days. The championship was originally structured as a 16-player round-robin tournament, set to coincide with the first release of FIDE's rapid and blitz ratings in July 2012; invited were the top 9 players in the FIDE ratings list, the defending champion Levon Aronian, the three medalists of the qualification competition, and three wild-card nominees by the organization committee and FIDE. The event has since been changed to a Swiss tournament with a field of over 100 grandmasters. The top three finishers in the standings are awarded gold, silver, and bronze medals respectively; tiebreaks are determined by the average rating of opponents.

The World Rapid & Blitz Chess Championships 2020 was postponed to 2021 because of the COVID-19 pandemic. It was planned to be held in Kazakhstan in December 2021; however, due to new regulations imposed by the Kazakh government, which would have required many participants to quarantine, the event had to be cancelled again on December 8, 2021. FIDE was considering to either hold the event in Kazakhstan in 2022, or to move it to a different host country. On December 10, 2021, Warsaw, Poland was announced as the new host city, with the tournament taking place from December 25–30, 2021.

=== Editions and medallists ===
==== Open ====
World Blitz Chess Championships (since 2012)
Year	Host city	Champion(s)	Runner-up	Third place
2012	(Kazakhstan) Astana	Alexander Grischuk (RUS)	Magnus Carlsen (NOR)	Sergey Karjakin (RUS)
2013	(Russia) Khanty-Mansiysk	Lê Quang Liêm (VIE)	Alexander Grischuk (RUS)	Ruslan Ponomariov (UKR)
2014	(United Arab Emirates) Dubai	Magnus Carlsen (NOR)	Ian Nepomniachtchi (RUS)	Hikaru Nakamura (USA)
2015	(Germany) Berlin	Alexander Grischuk (RUS)	Maxime Vachier-Lagrave (FRA)	Vladimir Kramnik (RUS)
2016	(Qatar) Doha	Sergey Karjakin (RUS)	Magnus Carlsen (NOR)	Daniil Dubov (RUS)
2017	(Saudi Arabia) Riyadh	Magnus Carlsen (NOR)	Sergey Karjakin (RUS)	Viswanathan Anand (IND)
2018	(Russia) Saint Petersburg	Magnus Carlsen (NOR)	Jan-Krzysztof Duda (POL)	Hikaru Nakamura (USA)
2019	(Russia) Moscow	Magnus Carlsen (NOR)	Hikaru Nakamura (USA)	Vladimir Kramnik (RUS)
2020	Not held due to COVID-19 pandemic			
2021	(Poland) Warsaw	Maxime Vachier-Lagrave (FRA)	Jan-Krzysztof Duda (POL)	Alireza Firouzja (FRA)
2022	(Kazakhstan) Almaty	Magnus Carlsen (NOR)	Hikaru Nakamura (USA)	Haik M. Martirosyan (ARM)
2023	(Uzbekistan) Samarkand	Magnus Carlsen (NOR)	Daniil Dubov (Note: Dubov, Artemiev, Nepomniachtchi, Shuvalova, Gunina and Lagno are Russians, but they competed under the FIDE flag due to the organization's ban of the Russian and Belarusian flags as part of its response to the 2022 Russian invasion of Ukraine.) (FIDE)	Vladislav Artemiev (FIDE)
2024	(United States) New York	Magnus Carlsen (NOR); Ian Nepomniachtchi (FIDE)	N/A	Jan-Krzysztof Duda (POL); Wesley So (USA)
2025	(Qatar) Doha	Magnus Carlsen (NOR)	Nodirbek Abdusattorov (UZB)	Fabiano Caruana (USA); Arjun Erigaisi (IND)
2026	(Turkey) Istanbul			

==== Women ====
Women's World Blitz Chess Championships (since 2012)
Year	Host city	Champion	Runner-up	Third place
2012	(Georgia (country)) Batumi	Valentina Gunina (RUS)	Natalia Zhukova (UKR)	Anna Muzychuk (SLO)
2013	Not held			
2014	(Russia) Khanty-Mansiysk	Anna Muzychuk (SLO)	Nana Dzagnidze (GEO)	Tatiana Kosintseva (RUS)
2015	Not held			
2016	(Qatar) Doha	Anna Muzychuk (UKR)	Valentina Gunina (RUS)	Kateryna Lagno (RUS)
2017	(Saudi Arabia) Riyadh	Nana Dzagnidze (GEO)	Valentina Gunina (RUS)	Ju Wenjun (CHN)
2018	(Russia) Saint Petersburg	Kateryna Lagno (RUS)	Sarasadat Khademalsharieh (IRI)	Lei Tingjie (CHN)
2019	(Russia) Moscow	Kateryna Lagno (RUS)	Anna Muzychuk (UKR)	Tan Zhongyi (CHN)
2020	Not held due to COVID-19 pandemic			
2021	(Poland) Warsaw	Bibisara Assaubayeva (KAZ)	Alexandra Kosteniuk (Note: Kosteniuk and Gunina are Russians, but they competed under the Chess Federation of Russia flag, due to WADA sanctions against Russia.) (CFR)	Valentina Gunina (CFR)
2022	(Kazakhstan) Almaty	Bibisara Assaubayeva (KAZ)	Koneru Humpy (IND)	Polina Shuvalova (FIDE)
2023	(Uzbekistan) Samarkand	Valentina Gunina (FIDE)	Alexandra Kosteniuk (SUI)	Zhu Jiner (CHN)
2024	(United States) New York	Ju Wenjun (CHN)	Lei Tingjie (CHN)	Kateryna Lagno (FIDE); Vaishali Rameshbabu (IND)
2025	(Qatar) Doha	Bibisara Assaubayeva (KAZ)	Anna Muzychuk (UKR)	Eline Roebers (NED); Zhu Jiner (CHN)
2026	(Turkey) Istanbul			

== Records ==
=== Titles (open) ===
Most Times Champion (including 1970, 1988 and 2000 events)
Times won	Player	Year(s)
9	Magnus Carlsen (NOR)	2009, 2014, 2017, 2018, 2019, 2022, 2023, 2024 (shared), 2025
3	Alexander Grischuk (RUS)	2006, 2012, 2015
1	Bobby Fischer (USA)	1970
1	Mikhail Tal (USSR)	1988
1	Viswanathan Anand (IND)	2000
1	Vasyl Ivanchuk (UKR)	2007
1	Leinier Domínguez (CUB)	2008
1	Levon Aronian (ARM)	2010
1	Lê Quang Liêm (VIE)	2013
1	Sergey Karjakin (RUS)	2016
1	Maxime Vachier-Lagrave (FRA)	2021
1	Ian Nepomniachtchi (FIDE)	2024 (shared)

=== Titles (women) ===
Most Times Champion (including 1992 and 2010 events)
Titles won	Player	Year(s)
3	(Ukraine) (Russia) Kateryna Lagno (UKR / RUS)	2010, 2018, 2019
3	Bibisara Assaubayeva (KAZ)	2021, 2022, 2025
2	(Slovenia) (Ukraine) Anna Muzychuk (SLO / UKR)	2014, 2016
2	(Russia) Valentina Gunina (RUS / FIDE)	2012, 2023
1	Susan Polgar (HUN)	1992
1	Nana Dzagnidze (GEO)	2017
1	Ju Wenjun (CHN)	2024

== See also ==
- World Rapid Chess Championship
- Fast chess
