= Champions Chess Tour 2021 =

Series of elite chess tournaments (2021)

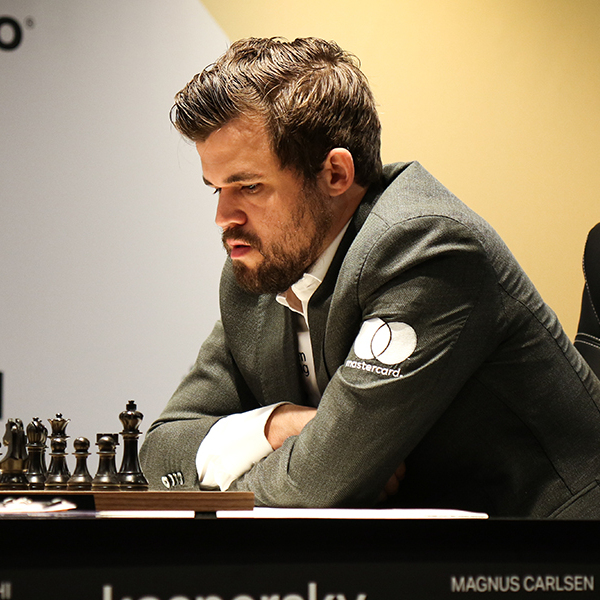
- Magnus Carlsen, winner of the tour

Details
- Duration: 22 November 2020 – 4 October 2021
- Tournaments: 10
- Categories: Regular (6); Major (3); Final (1)

Achievements (singles)
- Most titles: (Norway) Magnus Carlsen (4 titles)
- Most finals: (Norway) Magnus Carlsen (6)
- Points leader: (Norway) Magnus Carlsen (339)

The Champions Chess Tour 2021, known for sponsorship reasons as the Meltwater Champions Chess Tour, was a 10-month long series of 10 online chess tournaments featuring the world's top players, playing for a prize money pool of US$1.5 million. The tournament games were held on chess24.com and broadcast on Twitch, YouTube, chess24.com itself, and the tour's official website. The tour started on November 22, 2020, and lasted until October 4, 2021. The tournaments were not rated by FIDE.

== Format ==
There are 10 total tournaments in the tour: 6 labelled as Regular, 3 labelled as Major, and 1 Final. Each takes place towards the end of a month over the course of 9 days.

=== Qualification ===
According to the tour regulations, there are 16 spots in a Regular tournament, 12 spots in a Major tournament, and 10 spots in the Final tournament. However, after the first Major tournament (Airthings Masters), it was concluded that 8 out of 12 players advancing to the knockout round rewarded cautious play, and the remaining Major tournaments (Magnus Carlsen Invitational and FTX Crypto Cup) were conducted with 16 players.

For each of the Regular tournaments except for the first one, 8 of the 16 spots are given to the current top 8 players in the Tour Rankings. The rest of the spots are given out via wild cards, invitations, or popular votes. The 16 spots for the first tournament of the tour are chosen via the decision of the event organizers.

For the Major tournaments, 8 of the spots are also given to the current top 8 players in the Tour Rankings. The winner of the preceding Regular tournament is also given a spot, if he or she is not already in the top 8. The rest of the spots are given via wild cards.

For the Final tournament, 8 of the 10 spots are given first to the winners of the 3 Major tournaments, then down the standings of the Tour Rankings. The final 2 spots are given to the best-performing "Tour Ambassadors."

=== Schedule ===
Dates	Tournament Name	Type
November 22–30, 2020	Skilling Open	Regular
December 26, 2020 – January 3, 2021	Airthings Masters	Major
February 6–14, 2021	Opera Euro Rapid	Regular
March 13–21, 2021	Magnus Carlsen Invitational 2021	Major
April 24 – May 2, 2021	New In Chess Classic	Regular
May 23–31, 2021	FTX Crypto Cup	Major
June 26 – July 4, 2021	Goldmoney Asian Rapid	Regular
July 31 – August 8, 2021	Chessable Masters	Regular
August 28 – September 5, 2021	Aimchess US Rapid	Regular
September 25 – October 4, 2021	Meltwater Champions Chess Tour Finals	Final

=== Time controls ===
Three different time controls are used in the tour:

- In rapid games, each player has 15 minutes, plus a 10-second increment for each move.
- In blitz games, each player has 5 minutes, plus a 3-second increment for each move.
- In Armageddon games, white has 5 minutes, black has 4 minutes, there is no increment, and black wins the tie in case of a draw.

=== Tournament formats ===
==== Regular ====
The Regular tournaments consist of a preliminary round and 3 knockout rounds. In the preliminary round, the 16 players participate in a round-robin spanning 3 days (5 games per day), with each player playing the other players for 1 rapid game, for a total of 120 games. The top 8 players with the most points advance to the next round and are seeded for the purposes of making the bracket based on their points. In the event that 2 or more players are tied with points, the following system is used:

1. Points won in matches involving the tied players
2. Number of wins
3. Sonneborn–Berger score
4. Koya score

In the knockout rounds, each matchup consists of 2 matches of 4 rapid games on back-to-back days. If either player wins one match and at least draws the other, he advances on to the next round. If each player wins one match or both matches are drawn, immediately following the second match, the players play 2 blitz games. If the blitz games are split, the winner is determined via an Armageddon game. The higher seed in each matchup picks the color for the first game, the first tiebreaker, and the Armageddon. In addition to the games between players who advanced, there is also a match for third place between the semifinal losers.

==== Major ====
The Major tournaments operate the same way as the Regular tournaments. It is still the top 8 players who qualify for the knockout rounds.

==== Final ====
The Final only consists of one round-robin for the 10 players, spanning 9 days (1 matchup per day). Each matchup will comprise 4 rapid games. If the 4 points are split among the two players, then 2 blitz games are played, followed by Armageddon if the blitz games are split. 3 points are awarded for an outright win (no tiebreak needed), 2 points are awarded for a tiebreak win, and 1 point is awarded for a tiebreak loss.

In addition to these points, the players start off with bonus points based on their Tour rankings coming into the Final. The player with the fewest Tour points gets 0 bonus points, and the other players are awarded half a point for every full 10 points they have more than the player with the least number. For example, if Player A has the fewest Tour points with 86, a Player B with 143 Tour points will be awarded 2.5 points, since they exceed Player A's total by 57 (no rounding).

The player with the greatest sum of bonus points and points won in the Final will be crowned the Tour Champion.

=== Tour points ===
For Regular tournaments, points are awarded as follows.

Finish	Points
Winner	40
Runner-up	25
3rd place	15
4th place	10

In other words, a player receives 10 points for winning in the quarterfinals, 15 points for winning in the semifinals, 15 points for winning the final and 5 points for winning the match for third place. The regulations were present for most of the tournament, excluding the Skilling Open tournament; in that tournament of the tour, the runner-up was awarded 20 points and the two remaining semi-finalists were each awarded 10 points, without a match for 3rd place.

Additional points are also awarded to finishes in the preliminary round:

Finish	Points
1st	10
2nd	8
3rd	6
4th	5
5th	4
6th	3
7th	2
8th	1
9th–16th	0

The points system for Major tournaments is the same, but all values are doubled.

In the event that two players are tied for the same number of Tour points, the following tiebreak system will be used:

1. Number of tournament wins
2. Number of tournament appearances (fewer is better)
3. Number of final appearances
4. Number of semi-final appearances
5. Number of quarter-final appearances

The administrators of the tournament also have the right to substitute a tiebreak match if the tie is for a qualification spot.

=== Prize money ===
==== Regular ====
The total prize pool for a Regular tournament is $100,000. The money is split as follows:

Finish	Prize
Winner	$30,000
Runner-up	$15,000
3rd place	$8,500
4th place	$6,500
Quarterfinalist	$5,000
Preliminary	$2,500

The regulations were changed after the Skilling Open tournament; in this first tournament of the tour, the players who lost in the semifinals each received $7,500, without a match for 3rd place.

==== Major ====
The total prize pool for a Major tournament is $200,000. The money is split as follows:

Finish	Prize
Winner	$60,000
Runner-up	$40,000
3rd place	$25,000
4th place	$15,000
Quarterfinalist	$10,000
Preliminary	$5,000

==== Final ====
The prize pool for the final is $300,000, which is split as follows:

Finish	Prize
1st	$100,000
2nd	$60,000
3rd	$40,000
4th	$30,000
5th	$20,000
6th	$15,000
7th	$12,500
8th	$10,000
9th	$7,500
10th	$5,000

== Results ==
=== Tournament results ===
Dates	Tournament Name	Type	Winner	Runner-up	3rd place	4th Place
November 22–30, 2020	Skilling Open	Regular	(United States) Wesley So	(Norway) Magnus Carlsen	(United States) Hikaru Nakamura (Russia) Ian Nepomniachtchi	
December 26, 2020 – January 3, 2021	Airthings Masters	Major	(Azerbaijan) Teimour Radjabov	(Armenia) Levon Aronian	(France) Maxime Vachier-Lagrave	(Russia) Daniil Dubov
February 6–14, 2021	Opera Euro Rapid	Regular	(United States) Wesley So (2)	(Norway) Magnus Carlsen	(Azerbaijan) Teimour Radjabov	(France) Maxime Vachier-Lagrave
March 13–21, 2021	Magnus Carlsen Invitational	Major	(Netherlands) Anish Giri	(Russia) Ian Nepomniachtchi	(Norway) Magnus Carlsen	(United States) Wesley So
April 24 – May 2, 2021	New In Chess Classic	Regular	(Norway) Magnus Carlsen	(United States) Hikaru Nakamura	(Azerbaijan) Shakhriyar Mamedyarov	(Armenia) Levon Aronian
May 23–31, 2021	FTX Crypto Cup	Major	(Norway) Magnus Carlsen (2)	(United States) Wesley So	(Russia) Ian Nepomniachtchi	(Azerbaijan) Teimour Radjabov
June 26 – July 4, 2021	Goldmoney Asian Rapid	Regular	(Armenia) Levon Aronian	(Russia) Vladislav Artemiev	(Norway) Magnus Carlsen	(China) Ding Liren
July 31 – August 8, 2021	Chessable Masters	Regular	(United States) Wesley So (3)	(Vietnam) Lê Quang Liêm	(Russia) Vladislav Artemiev	(Armenia) Levon Aronian
August 28 – September 5, 2021	Aimchess US Rapid	Regular	(Norway) Magnus Carlsen (3)	(Russia) Vladislav Artemiev	(Armenia) Levon Aronian	(France) Alireza Firouzja
September 25 – October 4, 2021	Meltwater Champions Chess Tour Finals	Final	(Norway) Magnus Carlsen (4)	(Azerbaijan) Teimour Radjabov	(Armenia) Levon Aronian	(United States) Wesley So

=== Tour rankings ===
The column labelled "Wins" indicates the number of tournament wins.

The column labelled "Apps" indicates the number of tournament appearances (including the ongoing tournament, if any).

The winners of the Major tournaments are invited to the Final tournament, as are the 5 players (or more if one player has won more than one Major) with the highest tour ranking among the remaining players. Two additional players are invited as wild cards. As the winners of the Major tournaments (Teimour Radjabov, Anish Giri and Magnus Carlsen) are guaranteed a place in the Final. An asterisk denotes a Major.

Pos	Name	Wins	Apps	Skilling Open	Airthings Masters*	Opera Euro Rapid	Magnus Carlsen Invitational*	New In Chess Classic	FTX Crypto Cup*	Goldmoney Asian Rapid	Chessable Masters	Aimchess US Rapid	Total
1	(Norway) Magnus Carlsen	3	8	30	20	35	50	50	86	20		48	339
2	(United States) Wesley So	3	9	46	16	46	32	5	58	4	50	4	261
3	(Armenia) Levon Aronian	1	9	4	56	5	2	14	0	50	18	21	170
4	(Azerbaijan) Teimour Radjabov	1	6	3	88	17	0	1	24				133
5	(Netherlands) Anish Giri	1	7	1	0	8	96		16	2		0	123
6	(Russia) Ian Nepomniachtchi	0	5	15	10	0	58		32				115
7	(United States) Hikaru Nakamura	0	7	18	12	0	10	33	12		5		90
8	(Russia) Vladislav Artemiev	0	3							33	19	35	87
9	(France) Maxime Vachier-Lagrave	0	6	2	34	14	4		10			0	64
10	(Vietnam) Lê Quang Liêm	0	4	0				2			28	0	30
11	(France) Alireza Firouzja (Note: Firouzja previously played under the FIDE flag as a neutral competitor from December 2019 to July 2021, which spanned from the Skilling Open to the Goldmoney Asian Rapid in the Champions Chess Tour. Firouzja started playing under the French flag in July 2021.)	0	7	0			6	3	0	0	6	15	30
12	(Azerbaijan) Shakhriyar Mamedyarov	0	5				0	21	0		2	3	26
13	(Russia) Daniil Dubov	0	5		22	1	0		0	0			23
14	(United States) Fabiano Caruana	0	1						20				20
15	(China) Ding Liren	0	4	0		0			0	16			16
16	(Poland) Jan-Krzysztof Duda	0	5	0		3		0		3		2	8
17	(India) Arjun Erigaisi	0	1							1			1
18	(Netherlands) Jorden van Foreest	0	3				0				1	0	1
18	(United States) Leinier Domínguez	0	3			0		0				1	1
20	(United States) Daniel Naroditsky	0	1									0	0
20	(Canada) Eric Hansen	0	1									0	0
20	(United States) Awonder Liang	0	1									0	0
20	(United States) Abhimanyu Mishra	0	1								0		0
20	(China) Ju Wenjun	0	1								0		0
20	(India) Koneru Humpy	0	1								0		0
20	(Spain) Eduardo Iturrizaga	0	1								0		0
20	(China) Hou Yifan	0	1							0			0
20	(India) Gukesh D	0	1							0			0
20	(United Arab Emirates) Salem Saleh	0	1							0			0
20	(India) Rameshbabu Praggnanandhaa	0	1					0					0
20	(England) Gawain Jones	0	1					0					0
20	(Norway) Johan-Sebastian Christiansen	0	1					0					0
20	(United States) Sam Shankland	0	1			0							0
20	(Germany) Matthias Bluebaum	0	1			0							0
20	(Sweden) Nils Grandelius	0	1				0						0
32	(India) Pentala Harikrishna	0	2		0						0		0
32	(India) Adhiban Baskaran	0	2							0	0		0
32	(Norway) Aryan Tari	0	2					0			0		0
32	(Argentina) Alan Pichot	0	2				0		0				0
37	(Russia) Peter Svidler	0	3	0					0	0			0
37	(Russia) Alexander Grischuk	0	3		0	0			0				0
37	(Russia) Sergey Karjakin	0	3	0			0	0					0
40	(Spain) David Antón Guijarro	0	4	0	0		0				0		0
41	(India) Vidit Gujrathi	0	5	0		0		0		0		0	0

=== Tournaments ===
==== Skilling Open ====
The results of the preliminary round were as follows.

	Name	ELO	01	02	03	04	05	06	07	08	09	10	11	12	13	14	15	16	Points
01	Magnus Carlsen (Norway)	2881	-	½	½	0	½	1	½	½	1	½	½	1	1	½	0	1	9
02	Hikaru Nakamura (United States)	2829	½	-	½	1	½	½	½	½	1	0	½	½	1	½	1	½	9
03	Wesley So (United States)	2741	½	½	-	½	1	½	½	½	0	1	½	½	½	½	½	1	8½
04	Ian Nepomniachtchi (Russia)	2778	1	0	½	-	½	1	½	½	½	½	½	½	0	1	½	1	8½
05	Levon Aronian (Armenia)	2778	½	½	0	½	-	0	½	1	0	1	½	1	½	½	1	1	8½
06	Teimour Radjabov (Azerbaijan)	2758	0	½	½	0	1	-	1	½	1	½	0	½	0	½	1	1	8
07	Maxime Vachier-Lagrave (France)	2860	½	½	½	½	½	0	-	½	½	1	½	½	1	0	½	1	8
08	Anish Giri (Netherlands)	2731	½	½	½	½	0	½	½	-	0	1	½	1	½	½	1	½	8
09	Alireza Firouzja (FIDE)	2703	0	0	1	½	1	0	½	1	-	0	1	½	1	½	1	0	8
10	Lê Quang Liêm (Vietnam)	2744	½	1	0	½	0	½	0	0	1	-	½	½	1	1	1	½	8
11	Ding Liren (China)	2836	½	½	½	½	½	1	½	½	0	½	-	½	1	½	½	0	7½
12	Vidit Gujrathi (India)	2636	0	½	½	½	0	½	½	0	½	½	½	-	1	1	0	½	6½
13	David Antón Guijarro (Spain)	2667	0	0	½	1	½	1	0	½	0	0	0	0	-	1	1	1	6½
14	Peter Svidler (Russia)	2742	½	½	½	0	½	½	1	½	½	0	½	0	0	-	½	½	6
15	Sergey Karjakin (Russia)	2709	1	0	½	½	0	0	½	0	0	0	½	1	0	½	-	1	5½
16	Jan-Krzysztof Duda (Poland)	2774	0	½	0	0	0	0	0	½	1	½	1	½	0	½	0	-	4½

The results of the knockout rounds were as follows.

Quarterfinal (November 25–26)
(Norway) Magnus Carlsen	2½	2	-
(Netherlands) Anish Giri	1½	2	-
(Armenia) Levon Aronian	2½	1	0
(Russia) Ian Nepomniachtchi	1½	3	2
(United States) Wesley So	½	2½	1½^{*}
(Azerbaijan) Teimour Radjabov	2½	1½	1½
(France) Maxime Vachier-Lagrave	3	½	1½
(United States) Hikaru Nakamura	1	2½	1½^{*}

Semifinal (November 27–28)
(Norway) Magnus Carlsen	2½	2	-
(Russia) Ian Nepomniachtchi	1½	2	-
(United States) Wesley So	2½	2	-
(United States) Hikaru Nakamura	1½	2	-

Final (November 29–30)
(Norway) Magnus Carlsen	2	2	½
(United States) Wesley So	2	2	1½

^{*} This player advanced by drawing as black in an Armageddon game.

==== Airthings Masters ====
The results of the preliminary round were as follows.

	Name	ELO	01	02	03	04	05	06	07	08	09	10	11	12	Points
01	Magnus Carlsen (Norway)	2881	-	½	1	½	½	½	½	1	½	½	½	½	6½
02	Wesley So (United States)	2741	½	-	½	½	½	½	½	1	½	½	1	½	6½
03	Hikaru Nakamura (United States)	2829	0	½	-	½	½	½	½	½	½	1	1	1	6½
04	Ian Nepomniachtchi (Russia)	2778	½	½	½	-	½	½	1	1	½	0	½	½	6
05	Teimour Radjabov (Azerbaijan)	2758	½	½	½	½	-	½	½	½	½	½	½	1	6
06	Levon Aronian (Armenia)	2778	½	½	½	½	½	-	½	½	½	½	1	0	5½
07	Maxime Vachier-Lagrave (France)	2860	½	½	½	0	½	½	-	½	½	1	0	½	5
08	Daniil Dubov (Russia)	2770	0	0	½	0	½	½	½	-	½	½	1	1	5
09	Pentala Harikrishna (India)	2705	½	½	½	½	½	½	½	½	-	½	0	½	5
10	Alexander Grischuk (Russia)	2784	½	½	0	1	½	½	0	½	½	-	½	½	5
11	Anish Giri (Netherlands)	2731	½	0	0	½	½	0	1	0	1	½	-	½	4½
12	David Antón Guijarro (Spain)	2667	½	½	0	½	0	1	½	0	½	½	½	-	4½

The results of the knockout rounds were as follows.

Quarterfinal (December 29–30)
(Norway) Magnus Carlsen	2	½	-
(Russia) Daniil Dubov	2	2½	-
(Azerbaijan) Teimour Radjabov	2	2	1½^{*}
(Russia) Ian Nepomniachtchi	2	2	1½
(United States) Hikaru Nakamura	1½	0	-
(Armenia) Levon Aronian	2½	2	-
(France) Maxime Vachier-Lagrave	3	1½	1½^{*}
(United States) Wesley So	1	2½	1½

Semifinal (Dec 31 - Jan 1)
(Russia) Daniil Dubov	1	0	-
(Azerbaijan) Teimour Radjabov	3	2	-
(Armenia) Levon Aronian	3	2	-
(France) Maxime Vachier-Lagrave	1	1	-

Final (January 2–3)
(Azerbaijan) Teimour Radjabov	2½	2	-
(Armenia) Levon Aronian	1½	1	-
3rd place (January 2–3)
(Russia) Daniil Dubov	2	1½	-
(France) Maxime Vachier-Lagrave	2	2½	-

^{*} This player advanced by drawing as black in an Armageddon game.

==== Opera Euro Rapid ====
	Name	ELO	01	02	03	04	05	06	07	08	09	10	11	12	13	14	15	16	Points
01	Magnus Carlsen (Norway)	2881	-	½	0	1	½	½	½	½	1	1	½	1	1	½	1	0	9½
02	Anish Giri (Netherlands)	2731	½	-	½	½	1	½	½	½	0	½	1	1	½	½	1	1	9½
03	Wesley So (United States)	2741	1	½	-	½	0	1	½	1	½	1	½	½	0	½	1	½	9
04	Levon Aronian (Armenia)	2778	0	½	½	-	1	½	½	0	½	1	1	½	1	½	0	1	8½
05	Maxime Vachier-Lagrave (France)	2860	½	0	1	0	-	½	½	1	½	½	½	½	1	½	½	1	8½
06	Jan-Krzysztof Duda (Poland)	2774	½	½	0	½	½	-	½	1	½	½	0	½	0	1	1	1	8
07	Teimour Radjabov (Azerbaijan)	2758	½	½	½	½	½	½	-	½	½	1	½	½	½	½	½	½	8
08	Daniil Dubov (Russia)	2770	½	½	0	1	0	0	½	-	½	1	½	0	1	½	½	1	7½
09	Hikaru Nakamura (United States)	2829	0	1	½	½	½	½	½	½	-	0	0	½	½	½	1	1	7½
10	Sam Shankland (United States)	2609	0	½	0	0	½	½	0	0	1	-	½	1	½	½	1	1	7
11	Ian Nepomniachtchi (Russia)	2778	½	0	½	0	½	1	½	½	1	½	-	½	0	1	0	½	7
12	Vidit Gujrathi (India)	2636	0	0	½	½	½	½	½	1	½	0	½	-	1	½	½	0	6½
13	Leinier Domínguez (United States)	2786	0	½	1	0	0	1	½	0	½	½	1	0	-	1	½	0	6½
14	Alexander Grischuk (Russia)	2784	½	½	½	½	½	0	½	½	½	½	0	½	0	-	½	1	6½
15	Matthias Bluebaum (Germany)	2562	0	0	0	1	½	0	½	½	0	0	1	½	½	½	-	½	5½
16	Ding Liren (China)	2836	1	0	½	0	0	0	½	0	0	0	½	1	1	0	½	-	5

Quarterfinal (February 9–10)
(Norway) Magnus Carlsen	2½	½	2
(Russia) Daniil Dubov	½	2½	1
(France) Maxime Vachier-Lagrave	2½	2	-
(Armenia) Levon Aronian	1½	2	-
(United States) Wesley So	2½	2	-
(Poland) Jan-Krzysztof Duda	1½	0	-
(Azerbaijan) Teimour Radjabov	2	2	1½
(Netherlands) Anish Giri	2	2	½

Semifinal (February 11–12)
(Norway) Magnus Carlsen	2½	1	2
(France) Maxime Vachier-Lagrave	½	3	1
(United States) Wesley So	2½	2	-
(Azerbaijan) Teimour Radjabov	1½	1	-

Final (February 13–14)
(Norway) Magnus Carlsen	2	1½	-
(United States) Wesley So	2	2½	-
3rd place (February 13–14)
(France) Maxime Vachier-Lagrave	1½	0	-
(Azerbaijan) Teimour Radjabov	2½	2	-

==== Magnus Carlsen Invitational ====
	Name	ELO	01	02	03	04	05	06	07	08	09	10	11	12	13	14	15	16	Points
01	Magnus Carlsen (Norway)	2881	-	0	½	½	1	½	1	½	1	½	½	1	½	1	1	1	10½
02	Anish Giri (Netherlands)	2731	1	-	1	½	0	½	½	1	½	½	½	1	½	½	1	1	10
03	Wesley So (United States)	2741	½	0	-	½	0	½	½	1	1	1	½	½	1	1	½	1	9½
04	Hikaru Nakamura (United States)	2829	½	½	½	-	½	½	½	1	½	½	½	½	1	½	½	1	9
05	Ian Nepomniachtchi (Russia)	2778	0	1	1	½	-	½	1	0	½	0	½	1	½	0	1	1	8½
06	Alireza Firouzja (FIDE)	2703	½	½	½	½	½	-	½	½	0	½	1	1	1	½	0	1	8½
07	Maxime Vachier-Lagrave (France)	2860	0	½	½	½	0	½	-	½	½	½	1	1	½	½	1	1	8½
08	Levon Aronian (Armenia)	2778	½	0	0	0	1	½	½	-	1	½	½	0	½	1	1	1	8
09	Sergey Karjakin (Russia)	2709	0	½	0	½	½	1	½	0	-	½	1	0	1	1	1	½	8
10	Daniil Dubov (Russia)	2770	½	½	0	½	1	½	½	½	½	-	0	½	1	0	1	½	7½
11	Teimour Radjabov (Azerbaijan)	2758	½	½	½	½	½	0	0	½	0	1	-	½	½	½	1	½	7
12	Shakhriyar Mamedyarov (Azerbaijan)	2761	0	0	½	½	0	0	0	1	1	½	½	-	1	1	0	½	6½
13	Nils Grandelius (Sweden)	2632	½	½	0	0	½	0	½	½	0	0	½	0	-	1	1	1	6
14	Jorden van Foreest (Netherlands)	2543	0	½	0	½	1	½	½	0	0	1	½	0	0	-	1	½	6
15	David Antón Guijarro (Spain)	2674	0	0	½	½	0	1	0	0	0	0	0	1	0	0	-	1	4
16	Alan Pichot (Argentina)	2548	0	0	0	0	0	0	0	0	½	½	½	½	0	½	0	-	2½

Quarterfinal (March 16–17)
(Norway) Magnus Carlsen	2½	2	-
(Armenia) Levon Aronian	½	1	-
(Russia) Ian Nepomniachtchi	2	2½	-
(United States) Hikaru Nakamura	2	½	-
(United States) Wesley So	2½	2½	-
(FIDE) Alireza Firouzja	½	½	-
(France) Maxime Vachier-Lagrave	2	1	-
(Netherlands) Anish Giri	2	3	-

Semifinal (March 18–19)
(Norway) Magnus Carlsen	1½	2½	½
(Russia) Ian Nepomniachtchi	2½	1½	1½
(United States) Wesley So	1½	1½	-
(Netherlands) Anish Giri	2½	2½	-

Final (March 20–21)
(Russia) Ian Nepomniachtchi	2	2	0
(Netherlands) Anish Giri	2	2	2
3rd place (March 20–21)
(Norway) Magnus Carlsen	3	2	-
(United States) Wesley So	1	1	-

==== New In Chess Classic ====
	Name	ELO	01	02	03	04	05	06	07	08	09	10	11	12	13	14	15	16	Points
01	Magnus Carlsen (Norway)	2881	-	½	½	½	½	1	1	½	1	1	½	½	1	½	1	½	10½
02	Hikaru Nakamura (United States)	2829	½	-	1	½	½	½	½	½	½	1	½	½	½	½	1	1	9½
03	Shakhriyar Mamedyarov (Azerbaijan)	2761	½	0	-	0	½	1	0	½	1	1	1	½	1	1	½	1	9½
04	Wesley So (United States)	2741	½	½	1	-	½	0	½	½	½	1	1	1	0	1	0	1	9
05	Levon Aronian (Armenia)	2778	½	½	½	½	-	0	1	½	½	½	½	1	1	½	1	½	9
06	Alireza Firouzja (FIDE)	2703	0	½	0	1	1	-	½	½	1	0	½	½	0	1	1	1	8½
07	Lê Quang Liêm (Vietnam)	2744	0	½	1	½	0	½	-	½	½	½	1	1	0	½	1	1	8½
08	Teimour Radjabov (Azerbaijan)	2758	½	½	½	½	½	½	½	-	½	1	½	0	½	½	1	1	8½
09	Leinier Domínguez (United States)	2786	0	½	0	½	½	0	½	½	-	1	½	1	½	½	1	1	8
10	Aryan Tari (Norway)	2531	0	0	0	0	½	1	½	0	0	-	½	1	1	1	½	1	7
11	Vidit Gujrathi (India)	2636	½	½	0	0	½	½	0	½	½	½	-	½	1	0	1	1	7
12	Rameshbabu Praggnanandhaa (India)	1781	½	½	½	0	0	½	0	1	0	0	½	-	1	1	½	1	7
13	Jan-Krzysztof Duda (Poland)	2774	0	½	0	1	0	1	1	½	½	0	0	0	-	½	1	1	7
14	Sergey Karjakin (Russia)	2709	½	½	0	0	½	0	½	½	½	0	1	0	½	-	1	1	6½
15	Gawain Jones (England)	2615	0	0	½	1	0	0	0	0	0	½	0	½	0	0	-	½	3
16	Johan-Sebastian Christiansen (Norway)	2521	½	0	0	0	½	0	0	0	0	0	0	0	0	0	½	-	1½

Quarterfinal (April 27–28)
(Norway) Magnus Carlsen	2	2½	-
(Azerbaijan) Teimour Radjabov	2	1½	-
(Armenia) Levon Aronian	3	2	-
(United States) Wesley So	1	1	-
(Azerbaijan) Shakhriyar Mamedyarov	3	2½	-
(FIDE) Alireza Firouzja	1	½	-
(Vietnam) Lê Quang Liêm	1½	1	-
(United States) Hikaru Nakamura	2½	2	-

Semifinal (April 29–30)
(Norway) Magnus Carlsen	2	3	-
(Armenia) Levon Aronian	2	1	-
(Azerbaijan) Shakhriyar Mamedyarov	1	3	1
(United States) Hikaru Nakamura	3	0	2

Final (May 1–2)
(Norway) Magnus Carlsen	3	2	-
(United States) Hikaru Nakamura	1	2	-
3rd place (May 1–2)
(Armenia) Levon Aronian	2	½	-
(Azerbaijan) Shakhriyar Mamedyarov	2	2½

==== FTX Crypto Cup ====
	Name	ELO	01	02	03	04	05	06	07	08	09	10	11	12	13	14	15	16	Points
01	Fabiano Caruana (United States)	2773	-	1	½	½	½	½	½	1	½	0	½	1	½	1	1	1	10
02	Anish Giri (Netherlands)	2731	0	-	½	½	½	½	1	½	½	½	1	0	1	½	1	1	9
03	Hikaru Nakamura (United States)	2829	½	½	-	½	½	½	½	1	½	1	0	1	½	½	½	1	9
04	Maxime Vachier-Lagrave (France)	2860	½	½	½	-	½	1	½	1	½	0	½	½	½	½	1	1	9
05	Wesley So (United States)	2741	½	½	½	½	-	½	½	½	½	½	½	½	½	1	1	1	9
06	Magnus Carlsen (Norway)	2881	½	½	½	0	½	-	1	½	0	1	½	½	½	1	1	½	8½
07	Teimour Radjabov (Azerbaijan)	2758	½	0	½	½	½	0	-	1	½	½	½	1	1	½	½	1	8½
08	Ian Nepomniachtchi (Russia)	2778	0	½	0	0	½	½	0	-	1	½	½	½	1	1	1	1	8
09	Levon Aronian (Armenia)	2778	½	½	½	½	½	1	½	0	-	0	1	0	½	½	1	1	8
10	Shakhriyar Mamedyarov (Azerbaijan)	2761	1	½	0	1	½	0	½	½	1	-	0	½	½	0	½	1	7½
11	Alireza Firouzja (FIDE)	2703	½	0	1	½	½	½	½	½	0	1	-	½	½	1	0	0	7
12	Peter Svidler (Russia)	2742	0	1	0	½	½	½	0	½	1	½	½	-	½	½	0	1	7
13	Ding Liren (China)	2836	½	0	½	½	½	½	0	0	½	½	½	½	-	½	1	1	7
14	Daniil Dubov (Russia)	2770	0	½	½	½	0	0	½	0	½	1	0	½	½	-	½	1	6
15	Alexander Grischuk (Russia)	2784	0	0	½	0	0	0	½	0	0	½	1	1	0	½	-	1	5
16	Alan Pichot (Argentina)	2548	0	0	0	0	0	½	0	0	0	0	1	0	0	0	0	-	1½

Quarterfinal (May 26–27)
(United States) Fabiano Caruana	2	2	½
(Russia) Ian Nepomniachtchi	2	2	1½
(United States) Wesley So	3	2	-
(France) Maxime Vachier-Lagrave	1	1	-
(United States) Hikaru Nakamura	2	2	0
(Norway) Magnus Carlsen	2	2	2
(Azerbaijan) Teimour Radjabov	2½	2	-
(Netherlands) Anish Giri	1½	2	-

Semifinal (May 28–29)
(Russia) Ian Nepomniachtchi	1½	1	-
(United States) Wesley So	2½	2	-
(Norway) Magnus Carlsen	2	3	-
(Azerbaijan) Teimour Radjabov	2	1	-

Final (May 30–31)
(United States) Wesley So	2	2	1
(Norway) Magnus Carlsen	2	2	2
3rd place (May 30–31)
(Russia) Ian Nepomniachtchi	2	2½	-
(Azerbaijan) Teimour Radjabov	2	1½	-

==== Goldmoney Asian Rapid ====
	Name	ELO	01	02	03	04	05	06	07	08	09	10	11	12	13	14	15	16	Points
01	Levon Aronian (Armenia)	2778	-	½	½	1	½	½	½	1	1	½	½	1	1	½	1	½	10½
02	Vladislav Artemiev (Russia)	2757	½	-	0	½	0	1	½	1	1	½	½	1	½	1	1	1	10
03	Ding Liren (China)	2836	½	1	-	½	½	0	½	½	1	½	1	½	½	1	1	½	9½
04	Magnus Carlsen (Norway)	2881	0	½	½	-	½	½	½	½	0	1	1	½	1	1	½	1	9
05	Wesley So (United States)	2741	½	1	½	½	-	1	0	½	½	½	½	½	½	1	1	½	9
06	Jan-Krzysztof Duda (Poland)	2774	½	0	1	½	0	-	½	½	1	½	½	1	1	0	0	1	8
07	Anish Giri (Netherlands)	2731	½	½	½	½	1	½	-	½	1	½	0	½	1	½	0	½	8
08	Arjun Erigaisi (India)	2289	0	0	½	½	½	½	½	-	½	1	½	½	1	½	½	1	8
09	Alireza Firouzja (FIDE)	2703	0	0	0	1	½	0	0	½	-	½	1	1	½	1	1	1	8
10	Vidit Gujrathi (India)	2636	½	½	½	0	½	½	½	0	½	-	1	0	0	½	1	1	7
11	Peter Svidler (Russia)	2742	½	½	0	0	½	½	1	½	0	0	-	½	½	0	1	1	6½
12	Gukesh D (India)	1927	0	0	½	½	½	0	½	½	0	1	½	-	0	1	½	1	6½
13	Daniil Dubov (Russia)	2770	0	½	½	0	½	0	0	0	½	1	½	1	-	0	½	1	6
14	Salem Saleh (United Arab Emirates)	2718	½	0	0	0	0	1	½	½	0	½	1	0	1	-	0	½	5½
15	Adhiban Baskaran (India)	2624	0	0	0	½	0	1	1	½	0	0	0	½	½	1	-	0	5
16	Hou Yifan (China)	2621	½	0	½	0	½	0	½	0	0	0	0	0	0	½	1	-	3½

Quarterfinal (June 29–30)
(Armenia) Levon Aronian	2	2	1½
(India) Arjun Erigaisi	2	2	½
(United States) Wesley So	1½	2½	½
(Norway) Magnus Carlsen	2½	1½	1½
(China) Ding Liren	2	3	-
(Poland) Jan-Krzysztof Duda	2	1	-
(Netherlands) Anish Giri	0	1	-
(Russia) Vladislav Artemiev	3	2	-

Semifinal (July 1–2)
(Armenia) Levon Aronian	1½	3	2
(Norway) Magnus Carlsen	2½	1	0
(China) Ding Liren	2½	1½	½
(Russia) Vladislav Artemiev	½	2½	1½

Final (July 3–4)
(Armenia) Levon Aronian	2½	2	-
(Russia) Vladislav Artemiev	1½	0	-
3rd place (July 3–4)
(Norway) Magnus Carlsen	2½	0	1½
(China) Ding Liren	1½	3	½

==== Chessable Masters ====
	Name	ELO	01	02	03	04	05	06	07	08	09	10	11	12	13	14	15	16	Points
01	Wesley So (United States)	2774	-	1	½	½	1	½	½	½	1	1	½	½	1	½	1	1	11
02	Levon Aronian (Armenia)	2761	0	-	½	½	½	½	½	0	1	1	1	1	1	1	1	1	10½
03	Alireza Firouzja (France)	2703	½	½	-	½	½	1	½	½	1	½	1	0	1	1	1	1	10½
04	Hikaru Nakamura (United States)	2829	½	½	½	-	½	½	½	½	1	1	1	1	½	1	1	½	10½
05	Vladislav Artemiev (Russia)	2757	0	½	½	½	-	½	½	½	1	1	0	1	1	1	½	1	9½
06	Lê Quang Liêm (Vietnam)	2744	½	½	0	½	½	-	1	½	½	½	½	½	½	1	1	1	9
07	Shakhriyar Mamedyarov (Azerbaijan)	2761	½	½	½	½	½	0	-	½	1	½	½	½	1	½	1	1	9
08	Jorden van Foreest (Netherlands)	2543	½	1	½	½	½	½	½	-	0	½	0	½	1	1	1	½	8½
09	Adhiban Baskaran (India)	2624	0	0	0	0	0	½	0	1	-	1	1	½	1	½	1	½	7
10	Eduardo Iturrizaga (Spain)	2647	0	0	½	0	0	½	½	½	0	-	½	1	½	1	1	1	7
11	Aryan Tari (Norway)	2531	½	0	0	0	1	½	½	1	0	½	-	½	0	½	½	1	6½
12	Pentala Harikrishna (India)	2705	½	0	1	0	0	½	½	½	½	0	½	-	0	1	0	1	6
13	David Antón Guijarro (Spain)	2674	0	0	0	½	0	½	0	0	0	½	1	1	-	0	1	1	5½
14	Ju Wenjun (China)	2610	½	0	0	0	0	0	½	0	½	0	½	0	1	-	1	1	5
15	Abhimanyu Mishra (United States)	—	0	0	0	0	½	0	0	0	0	0	½	1	0	0	-	½	2½
16	Koneru Humpy (India)	2483	0	0	0	½	0	0	0	½	½	0	0	0	0	0	½	-	2

Quarterfinal (August 3–4)
(United States) Wesley So	2	2½	-
(Netherlands) Jorden van Foreest	2	½	-
(Russia) Vladislav Artemiev	2	2	2
(United States) Hikaru Nakamura	2	2	1
(France) Alireza Firouzja	1	0	-
(Vietnam) Lê Quang Liêm	3	2	-
(Azerbaijan) Shakhriyar Mamedyarov	½	1	-
(Armenia) Levon Aronian	2½	2	-

Semifinal (August 5–6)
(United States) Wesley So	2½	2	-
(Russia) Vladislav Artemiev	1½	2	-
(Vietnam) Lê Quang Liêm	3	1½	2
(Armenia) Levon Aronian	1	2½	1

Final (August 7–8)
(United States) Wesley So	2½	2	-
(Vietnam) Lê Quang Liêm	½	2	-
3rd place (August 7–8)
(Russia) Vladislav Artemiev	2	2½	-
(Armenia) Levon Aronian	2	½	-

==== Aimchess US Rapid ====
	Name	ELO	01	02	03	04	05	06	07	08	09	10	11	12	13	14	15	16	Points
01	Vladislav Artemiev (Russia)	2757	-	½	1	½	1	½	½	½	½	1	½	½	½	1	1	1	10½
02	Magnus Carlsen (Norway)	2881	½	-	½	0	1	½	½	½	½	1	½	1	1	½	1	1	10
03	Levon Aronian (Armenia)	2761	0	½	-	½	½	½	½	1	½	1	0	½	1	1	1	1	9½
04	Alireza Firouzja (France)	2696	½	1	½	-	½	½	½	1	½	1	0	½	1	½	1	½	9½
05	Wesley So (United States)	2774	0	0	½	½	-	½	1	1	½	½	1	0	½	1	1	1	9
06	Shakhriyar Mamedyarov (Azerbaijan)	2756	½	½	½	½	½	-	½	1	½	½	½	1	0	1	½	1	9
07	Jan-Krzysztof Duda (Poland)	2775	½	½	½	½	0	½	-	0	½	1	½	1	1	1	½	1	9
08	Leinier Domínguez (United States)	2786	½	½	0	0	0	0	1	-	½	½	1	1	1	0	1	1	8
09	Anish Giri (Netherlands)	2744	½	½	½	½	½	½	½	½	-	½	½	½	½	1	½	½	8
10	Maxime Vachier-Lagrave (France)	2817	0	0	0	0	½	½	0	½	½	-	½	1	1	1	1	1	7½
11	Vidit Gujrathi (India)	2636	½	½	1	1	0	½	½	0	½	½	-	½	0	1	½	½	7½
12	Daniel Naroditsky (United States)	2639	½	0	½	½	1	0	0	0	½	0	½	-	1	1	½	0	6
13	Lê Quang Liêm (Vietnam)	2744	½	0	0	0	½	1	0	0	½	0	1	0	-	½	1	1	6
14	Jorden van Foreest (Netherlands)	2563	0	½	0	½	0	0	0	1	0	0	0	0	½	-	1	1	4½
15	Eric Hansen (Canada)	2579	0	0	0	0	0	½	½	0	½	0	½	½	0	0	-	1	3½
16	Awonder Liang (United States)	2397	0	0	0	½	0	0	0	0	½	0	½	1	0	0	0	-	2½

Quarterfinal (Aug 31 - Sep 1)
(Russia) Vladislav Artemiev	2	3	-
(United States) Leinier Domínguez	2	1	-
(United States) Wesley So	½	2½	½
(France) Alireza Firouzja	2½	1½	1½
(Armenia) Levon Aronian	3	2	-
(Azerbaijan) Shakhriyar Mamedyarov	1	1	-
(Poland) Jan-Krzysztof Duda	½	½	-
(Norway) Magnus Carlsen	2½	2½	-

Semifinal (September 2–3)
(Russia) Vladislav Artemiev	2	2	2
(France) Alireza Firouzja	2	2	1
(Armenia) Levon Aronian	2	1	-
(Norway) Magnus Carlsen	2	3	-

Final (September 4–5)
(Russia) Vladislav Artemiev	1½	½	-
(Norway) Magnus Carlsen	2½	2½	-

=== Tour Final ===
Teimour Radjabov, Anish Giri and Magnus Carlsen qualified by winning a Major tournament, while Wesley So, Levon Aronian, Hikaru Nakamura and Vladislav Artemiev qualified for the finals via the tour standings. Maxime Vachier-Lagrave replaced Ian Nepomniachtchi, while Shakhriyar Mamedyarov and Jan-Krzysztof Duda got a wildcard spot. Every player, except for Duda, starts with extra points according to their Tour standings. (Note: Every player gets an extra 0.5 point for every 10 Tour points ahead of player with least Tour points (in this case, Jan-Krzysztof Duda))

	Name	ELO	01	02	03	04	05	06	07	08	09	10	Bonus	Points	Total
01	Magnus Carlsen (Norway)	2842	-	0	0	3	3	0	2	2	3	2	16½	15	31½
02	Teimour Radjabov (Azerbaijan)	2747	3	-	3	3	1	1	1	3	3	3	6	21	27
03	Levon Aronian (Armenia)	2761	3	0	-	3	0	3	3	1	0	3	8	16	24
04	Wesley So (United States)	2766	0	0	0	-	1	3	2	0	2	3	12½	11	23½
05	Hikaru Nakamura (United States)	2836	0	2	3	2	-	2	1	2	3	2	4	17	21
06	Vladislav Artemiev (Russia)	2755	3	2	0	0	1	-	3	2	0	3	3½	14	17½
07	Anish Giri (Netherlands)	2712	1	2	0	1	2	0	-	3	0	0	5½	9	14½
08	Maxime Vachier-Lagrave (France)	2773	1	0	2	3	1	1	0	-	3	0	2½	11	13½
09	Jan-Krzysztof Duda (Poland)	2801	0	0	3	1	0	3	3	0	-	2	0	12	12
10	Shakhriyar Mamedyarov (Azerbaijan)	2727	1	0	0	0	1	0	3	3	1	-	0½	9	9½

=== Qualifiers ===
==== Chessable Qualifier ====
Chessable Qualifier was held from 17 to 18 October 2020, and was a qualification tournament for Skilling Open, the first event of the Champions Chess Tour.

	Name	ELO	01	02	03	04	05	06	07	Points
01	Peter Svidler (Russia)	2742	-	½	½	1	1	1	1	5
02	Rauf Mamedov (Azerbaijan)	2691	½	-	1	0	1	1	1	4½
03	S. L. Narayanan (India)	2436	½	0	-	½	½	1	1	3½
04	Sam Shankland (United States)	2609	0	1	½	-	½	0	1	3
05	Matthias Bluebaum (Germany)	2561	0	0	½	½	-	1	1	3
06	Grigoriy Oparin (Russia)	2736	0	0	0	1	0	-	½	1½
07	Gawain Jones (England)	2609	0	0	0	0	0	½	-	½

==== Magnus Carlsen Invitational Qualifier ====
	Name	ELO	01	02	03	04	Points
01	Alan Pichot (Argentina)	2548	-	½ ½	1 ½	½ 1	4
02	Nils Grandelius (Sweden)	2632	½ ½	-	1 ½	0 1	3½
03	Aryan Tari (Norway)	2531	0 ½	0 ½	-	1 1	3
04	Max Warmerdam (Netherlands)	2412	½ 0	1 0	0 0	-	1½

== Coverage ==
Chess24.com provided free live coverage of every tournament, with commentary in 10 different languages. They were broadcasting on their website, on the official tour website, and on Twitch. Various other chess streamers also provided live commentary.

== Sponsorship ==
Julius Baer and Opera were two listed sponsors of the event. Skilling sponsored the first tournament, while Airthings sponsored the second tournament. Cryptocurrency Company FTX sponsored the FTX Crypto Cup, providing 2.18 Bitcoin in the prize fund, worth $100,000 at the time of purchase. The Tour was also funded by offering Premium and VIP Tour Passes, services that offered perks such as voting on the wild cards, memberships for Chess24.com, and interaction opportunities with top chess players.

On January 3, 2021, Meltwater was announced as the title partner for the tour, which was accordingly renamed the Meltwater Champions Chess Tour.
