= Camilo Ernesto Gomez Garrido =

Cuban chess grandmaster (born 1987)

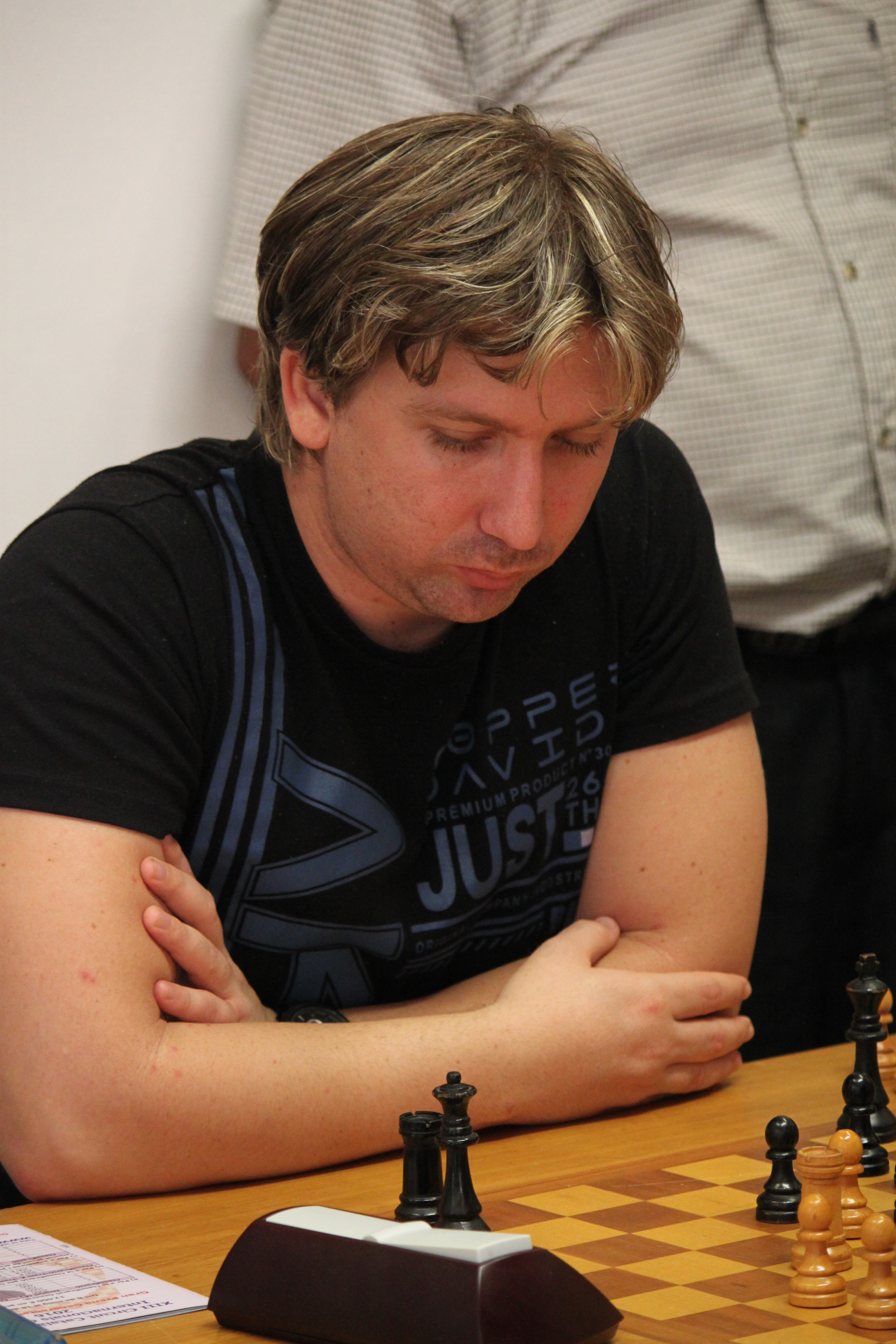
- Gomez Garrido in 2016

Personal information
- Born: October 23, 1987 (age 38) Holguín, Cuba

Chess career
- Country: Cuba
- Title: Grandmaster (2016)
- FIDE rating: 2480 (July 2026)
- Peak rating: 2560 (August 2016)

Camilo Ernesto Gomez Garrido is a Cuban chess grandmaster.

== Chess career ==
In February 2015, he finished in second place at the Cuban Blitz Championship, losing the title to super-grandmaster Leinier Domínguez.

He was the 2016 Catalan Circuit Champion.

In October 2019, he finished third in the Canadian International Open Championship, recording the best result for a Cuban player at the event. He also remained undefeated during the event.
