= Lê Quang Liêm =

Vietnamese chess grandmaster (born 1991)

- Quang Liêm in 2016

Personal information
- Born: 13 March 1991 (age 35) Ho Chi Minh City, Vietnam

Chess career
- Country: Vietnam
- Title: Grandmaster (2006)
- FIDE rating: 2732 (November 2026)
- Peak rating: 2741 (August 2024)
- Ranking: No. 16 (November 2026)
- Peak ranking: No. 14 (September 2024)

Lê Quang Liêm (born 13 March 1991) is a Vietnamese chess grandmaster, the top-ranked of his country. He was awarded the title of Grandmaster by FIDE in 2006. Liêm won the Asian Chess Championship in 2019 and was the World Blitz Chess Champion in 2013.

He has competed for the Vietnamese team at the Chess Olympiad since 2006. The best result occurred in 2012, when he scored 8/10 points on board 1 and his team finished in 7th place, the highest ever for Vietnam.

Quang Liêm has lived in St. Louis, Missouri, since 2021. He worked as the head coach for the Webster University Chess Team until the program ended in May 2026.

== Chess career ==
=== Early career ===
Lê Quang Liêm won a gold medal at the 2003 Asian Youth Chess Championships, held in Calicut, India, in the Under 12 category. As a result of this victory he was awarded the title of FIDE Master. In the 2004 edition, which took place in Singapore, Lê Quang Liêm won the Under 14 section. Also in 2004, he tied with Subramanian Arun Prasad for first place in the Asian Under 16 Championship in Tehran, Iran, taking the silver medal on tiebreak score. The next year Quang Liêm won the Under 14 division of the World Youth Chess Championship in July in Belfort, France.

=== 2008 ===
During August–September, he won the 1st Dragon Capital Vietnam chess open with 7/9.

=== 2009 ===
In September, he won the 4th Kolkata Open Chess Tournament ahead of 13 higher-rated players.

In December, Lê Quang Liêm with Vietnamese team won the silver prize at Tata Steel Asian Team Chess Championship in India, behind the host India. His personal performance is +4=1-1.

=== 2010 ===
In February, Lê Quang Liêm participated in the Moscow Open tournament in Moscow, Russia. With +5=4 performance, he tied for 1st-4th with Konstantin Chernyshov, Evgeny Bareev and Ernesto Inarkiev. Immediately after the Moscow open at the same venue, Quang Liêm won the 9th Aeroflot Open with 7/9 (+5=4), earning him an invitation to the Dortmund Sparkassen Chess Meeting.

From July 15 through the 25th, he took part in his first elite invitational tournament in Dortmund, in a field consisting of nine-time Dortmund champion and former World Champion Vladimir Kramnik, world No. 6 Shakhriyar Mamedyarov, former FIDE world champion Ruslan Ponomariov, 2004 World Chess Championship challenger Peter Leko, and former Dortmund champion Arkadij Naiditsch. Facing Kramnik with the black pieces in the opening round, Quang Liêm held the former world champion to a draw, and after defeating the eventual winner Ponomariov in round 4, and Leko in round 5, Quang Liêm finished with five consecutive draws to secure clear second place with 5½/10 (+2=7-1) and a performance rating of 2776.

From August 28 to September 3, he participated in the 1st Campomanes Memorial Cup Open in the Philippines. His final score was 7/9 (+5=4), a shared first place with Zhao Jun of China, who won on tiebreak score.

From 20 September to 4 October at Khanty-Mansiysk, Russia, Quang Liêm with the other Vietnamese players took part in the 39th World Team Chess Championship. Playing on board one, Quang Liêm's score was +2=7-2.

=== 2011 ===
From February 7 to February 18, he once again participated in Aeroflot Open and successfully defended the title. His score was 6½/9, a shared first place with Nikita Vitiugov and Evgeny Tomashevsky. At the time he was the only player to have won Aeroflot Open twice, now having been matched by Ian Nepomniachtchi in 2015. His win automatically qualified him for a return invitation to the Dortmund Invitational tournament, where he competed in a field that included Vladimir Kramnik, Hikaru Nakamura, and Ruslan Ponomariov among others.

From May 10 to May 21, he was invited to play in the Elite group of the Capablanca Memorial tournament, a very strong field of players (FIDE category 19) including reigning champion Vassily Ivanchuk, Latin America's number one Leinier Domínguez, Czech Republic's number one David Navara, Lázaro Bruzón of Cuba and Dmitry Andreikin of Russia. After the final round defeat to Ivanchuk, his score was 6½/10, a shared first place but ranked second after Ivanchuk via tiebreak score.

=== 2012 ===
From October 12 to 21, he participated in the SPICE Cup, the highest rated international invitational round-robin tournament in US history (FIDE category 18) including Maxime Vachier-Lagrave, Ding Liren, Wesley So, Georg Meier, and Csaba Balogh. He was undefeated but finished in a tie for second with Ding Liren, a half point behind the winner Vachier-Lagrave. After the tournament, he accepted a 4-year scholarship to attend Webster University, starting in August 2013.

=== 2013 ===
From March 19 to 24, he participated in the HD Bank Cup Open, the highest rated international open tournament in Vietnam. He was undefeated with six wins and three draws, scoring 7½/9, and winning the tournament.

From May 16 to 26, he participated in the Asian Continental Championships, which was held in the Philippines. He finished at 4th place with a score of 6½/9. Quang Liêm won the blitz championship with 8½/9.

From June 6 to 8, he took part in the World Rapid Chess Championship, held in Khanty-Mansiysk, Russia. He finished 4th, with 10/15, behind Shakhriyar Mamedyarov (11½/15), Ian Nepomniachtchi (11/15) and Alexander Grischuk (10½/15). After that he participated in the World Blitz Chess Championship, which he won, scoring 20½/30. He is the first Vietnamese athlete to achieve the world champion title.

=== 2014 ===
From June 15 to 20 Quang Liêm competed in the 2014 World Rapid and Blitz Championships in Dubai, UAE as the defending champion in blitz. At blitz Quang Liêm finished fourth with +12=4-5, behind the new champion Magnus Carlsen, Ian Nepomniachtchi and Hikaru Nakamura. At rapid, Quang Liêm finished 19th with +7=4-4.

From 2 to 15 August, Quang Liêm, Nguyen Ngoc Truong Son, and other Vietnamese chess players took part in the Chess Olympiad in Tromsø, Norway. Quang Liêm scored 5½ points from 10 games (+3-2=5) at board 1.

=== College chess ===
Quang Liêm graduated with summa cum laude, obtaining a bachelor of science in finance and a bachelor of arts in management from Webster University in St. Louis, Missouri, US in May, 2017. While at Webster University, Quang Liêm played Board 1 for the national championship chess team under the leadership of Susan Polgar, winning the President's Cup all four years as a student, 2014 through 2017.

=== 2017 ===
In March, Quang Liêm won the 7th HDBank tournament in Ho Chi Minh City, with total score 7 in 9 games (+5=4).

From 1 to 5 July, Quang Liêm participated in the World Open as the number 1 seed and finished at second place (behind Tigran L. Petrosian) with 7 points after 9 rounds.

From 8 to 18 July, Quang Liêm participated in Danzhou SuperGrandmaster Tournament in Danzhou, China. His result of 5½/9 (+2=7) earned him second place behind the winner Wei Yi, having the same number of points as Ding Liren but a worse tiebreak.

From 13 to 19 of August, Quang Liêm was invited to the Saint Louis rapid and blitz event of the Grand Chess Tour, with attendance of top super-grandmasters, including the return of Garry Kasparov. He shared the 5th place with Fabiano Caruana and Leinier Dominguez. In the event Quang Liêm won against Caruana, Aronian, Nakamura and Kasparov.

In early September he competed in the FIDE World Cup in Tbilisi, Georgia. He beat Vitaly Kunin from Germany in the first round, then Quang Liêm was eliminated by Vidit Santosh Gujrathi from India in the second.

From 21 to 27 September, Quang Liêm participated in the 5th Asian Indoor and Martial Art Games in Ashgabat, Turkmenistan. He won the gold medal with 5½ points after 7 games in the individual classical category. Then he also won, together with Nguyen Ngoc Truong Son, the team rapid and blitz categories.

=== 2018 ===
In the second Danzhou super-grandmaster tournament with all 8 participants with Elo higher than 2700, Quang Liêm finished second with 4/7 (+2=4-1). His only loss was to Bu Xiangzhi. Quang Liêm defeated Vidit Gujrathi and Samuel Shankland in the last two rounds.

=== 2019 ===
In June, Quang Liêm won the Asian Continental Championship in Xingtai, China, becoming the first Vietnamese player ever to do so. Soon after he also won the Summer Classic A tournament in St. Louis, US and the World Open (after a playoff with Jeffery Xiong) in Philadelphia, US.

=== 2021 ===
In 2021 Quang Liêm participated in the Meltwater Champions Chess Tour 2021. He scored 30 points across the tour, placing him 10th out of the 41 total tour participants. Consequently, he narrowly missed out on the tour finals. His most successful tournament in the tour was the Chessable Masters, where he beat super grandmasters Alireza Firouzja and Levon Aronian on his way to the final where he lost to Wesley So.

In the same year, Quang Liêm took the offer to be the chess coach at his alma mater, Webster University, succeeding Susan Polgar.

=== 2022 ===
In February Quang Liêm participated in the Airthings Masters round of the Champions Chess Tour 2022 where he qualified for quarter finals, which he lost to the eventual tournament winner Magnus Carlsen.

In March, he played in the second leg of the Champions Chess Tour, Charity Cup. He had a dominant qualifying, placing first with the score of 32/45 (football scoring, +9=5-1). He beat David Navara in the quarterfinal, but lost to Jan-Krzysztof Duda in the semifinal.

In April, at the Oslo Esports Cup, in contention for the championship, he beat Magnus Carlsen but was unable to secure a win over Jorden Van Foreest. In the end, the Cup went to Jan-Krzysztof Duda (14 points), ahead of Le Quang Liem (13 points), Magnus Carlsen (12 points), and Rameshbabu Praggnanandhaa, (12 points).

In July, Quang Liêm won the 2022 Biel Chess Festival with a score of 35.5.

In August (15-22), Quang Liêm participated at FTX Crypto Cup and finished fourth after Magnus Carlsen, Rameshbabu Praggnanandhaa and Alireza Firouzja, with results of +4-3.

=== 2023 ===
In April, the Webster University Chess Team won its sixth national collegiate chess title under the guidance of Coach Quang Liêm. This was Webster's first national chess title since 2017, when Lê Quang Liêm was still a student.

In July, Quang Liêm defended his title at the 2023 Biel Chess Festival with a score of 32.5.

== Notable tournament results ==
- 2005 World Championship (U14), Belfort (Classical) 1st 9/11
- 2008 Dragon Capital VietNam Chess Open (Classical) 1st 8/9
- 2009 Kolkata Open (classical) 1st 8/10
- 2010 Aeroflot Open (classical) 1st 7/9
- 2010 Dortmund Sparkassen Chess Meeting (classical) 2nd 5.5/10
- 2010 Campomanes Memorial (classical) 2nd 7/9
- 2010 Moscow Open (Classical) 3rd 7/9
- 2011 HD BANK Cup (Classical) 4th 6.5/9
- 2011 TATA Steel (Group B) 4th 7.5/13
- 2011 Aeroflot Open (classical) 1st 6.5/9
- 2011 Capablanca (classical) 2nd 6.5/10
- 2011 Dortmund Sparkassen Chess Meeting (classical) 2nd 5.5/10
- 2011 SPICE Cup (classical) 1st 17/10 (football score system)
- 2012 HD BANK Cup (classical) 2nd 7.5/9
- 2012 FIDE World Blitz Championship 7th 16.5/30
- 2012 SPICE Cup (Classical) 2nd 5.5/10
- 2012 Chess Olympiad Istanbul 2012 5th 8/11
- 2013 HD BANK Cup (Classical) 1st 7.5/9
- 2013 Asian Continental Chess Championships 4th 6.5/9
- 2013 Asian Continental Blitz Chess Championships 1st 8.5/9
- 2013 FIDE World Rapid Championships 4th 10/15
- 2013 FIDE World Blitz Championships 1st 20.5/30
- 2013 SPICE Cup (Classical) 3rd 6/9
- 2014 HD BANK Cup (Classical) 3rd 7/9
- 2014 FIDE World Blitz Championships 4th 14/21
- 2015 HD BANK Cup (Classical) 1st 7.5/9
- 2015 President's Cup (Armageddon) 1st 10/24
- 2015 Millionaire Chess Open (Classical) 2nd 6/7
- 2015 SPICE Cup (Classical) 1st 7/9
- 2016 College Final Four (Classical) 1st 3/3
- 2016 Asian Nations Cup (Blitz) 1st 4.5/5
- 2016 Asian Continental Chess Championships 2nd 6.5/9
- 2016 Asian Continental Blitz Chess Championships 2nd 7/9
- 2017 HD BANK Cup (Classical) 1st 7.0/9
- 2017 Danzhou Super Chess Grandmaster Tournament (Classical) 2nd 5.5/9
- 2017 St. Louis, Grand Chess Tour (rapid and blitz) : tied 5th (10 players in the tourney).
- 2017 AIMAG (Asian Indoor and Martial Art Games in Ashgabat, Turkmenistan) : 1st 5.5/7 (classical) and gold medals in team rapid and blitz categories.

Awards
| Preceded by Alexander Grischuk | World Blitz Chess Champion; 2013 | Succeeded by Magnus Carlsen |
