= Teimour Radjabov =

Azerbaijani chess grandmaster (born 1987)

- Radjabov at the 2026 Chess Olympiad

Personal information
- Born: Teymur Boris oğlu Rəcəbov; 12 March 1987 (age 39) Baku, Azerbaijan SSR, Soviet Union

Chess career
- Country: Azerbaijan
- Title: Grandmaster (2001)
- FIDE rating: 2689 (November 2026)
- Peak rating: 2793 (November 2012)
- Ranking: No. 38 (November 2026)
- Peak ranking: No. 4 (July 2012)

Teymur Boris oglu Rajabov (Note: Azerbaijani: Teymur Boris oğlu Rəcəbov, pronounced [tejˈmuɾ boˈɾis oɣˈlu ɾæˈdʒæbof]) (born 12 March 1987), known internationally as Teimour Radjabov (Note: Based on the translation of his name in Russian: Теймур Борис оглу Раджабов, romanized: Teimour Boris oglu Radjabov), is an Azerbaijani chess grandmaster.

A former child prodigy, he earned the title of Grandmaster in March 2001 at age 14, the second-youngest grandmaster in history at the time. In 2003, Radjabov gained international attention after beating the then-world No. 1 Garry Kasparov in the Linares tournament, followed by victories over former world champions Viswanathan Anand and Ruslan Ponomariov the same year. Radjabov continued his progress over the years to become an elite chess player. In November 2012, he achieved his peak rating of 2793 and was ranked as number 4 in the world. This made Radjabov the nineteenth-highest rated player in chess history.

He has thrice competed at the Candidates Tournament, in 2011, 2013, and 2022 (where he obtained third place); he also qualified for the 2020 edition but withdrew due to the coronavirus pandemic. He won the European Team Chess Championship with Azerbaijan in 2009, 2013, and 2017. His major individual achievements include joint first place in the 2007 Corus tournament, winning the 2008 Elista Grand Prix, 2017 Geneva Grand Prix, 2019 FIDE World Cup, and 2021 Airthings Masters.

== Early life ==
Radjabov was born on 12 March 1987 in Baku, Azerbaijan SSR (now Azerbaijan), to Boris Sheynin, a Jewish petroleum engineer who attended the same chess school in Baku as Garry Kasparov, and Leyla Radjabova, an Azerbaijani English languages teacher. Radjabov started playing chess at age three and attended secondary school number 160 in Baku. He was coached by his father.

== Career ==
Despite being the youngest of the participants, Radjabov in 1999 won the European Under 18 Championship, with the six years older Evgeny Postny in second place. While still 13 years old, the 2483-rated Radjabov finished in second place in the 2001 tournament Wijk aan Zee B, scoring +6−2=3. Mikhail Gurevich (2694) in first place was ½ point ahead and the player to qualify for next year's Wijk aan Zee A. Radjabov became the second-youngest player, after Judit Polgar, to make it into the FIDE Top 100 players list. With a rating of 2599 in January 2002, he was ranked 93rd in the world while still 14 years old. In the FIDE Moscow Grand Prix rapid event in June, he won matches against Ivanchuk, Svidler, Beliavsky, and Akopian before losing the final to Kasparov ½–1½.

In 2003, Radjabov defeated Garry Kasparov, Viswanathan Anand, and Ruslan Ponomariov with the black pieces, making him the first player to beat three former and reigning FIDE World Chess Champions with black in one year. Hikaru Nakamura repeated the feat in 2011 by beating Ponomariov, Anand, and Vladimir Kramnik. Radjabov's win against Ponomariov came in Wijk aan Zee, where Radjabov scored +3−3=7, while the one against Anand came in Dortmund, where he scored +2−2=6. The win against Kasparov in Linares was Radjabov's only win in the tournament, where he ended up with a +1−4=7 score. Kasparov had been undefeated in five consecutive Linares tournaments before losing to Radjabov. He had not lost a rated game with white in seven years, and never lost one again. In an interview in 2005, Radjabov claimed that Kasparov used his influence to prevent him from being invited to top tournaments after he defeated him at Linares 2003.

Radjabov participated in 2004 Linares, where he scored +2−2=8 and shared fourth place with Veselin Topalov, one point behind winner Vladimir Kramnik, after drawing both his games against Garry Kasparov. He also reached the semifinals (earning a bronze medal) at the FIDE World Chess Championship 2004.

=== Early wins ===
Radjabov won Dos Hermanas in April 2005, ahead of, among others, Dreev and Azmaiparashvili. Later in the year, he finished second in the European Championship, behind Nisipeanu but with Karjakin, Ivanchuk, and Aronian in third to fifth place.

On February 22, 2006, Radjabov defeated FIDE World Champion Veselin Topalov (2801) with the black pieces and subsequently finished second in Linares/Morelia after scoring +4−2=8 in the tournament. In November that year Radjabov won the strong Cap d'Agde rapid tournament. He won all his games in quarterfinal and semifinal against Volokitin and Bacrot, and won the final against Sergey Karjakin (who had eliminated Magnus Carlsen in his semifinal) 1½–½. In December, during the Creativity Festival in Florence (Tuscany, Italy), Radjabov lost a rapid game against Deep Junior, the chess engine that won the Turin World Computer Chess Championship.

In January 2007, Radjabov shared first place at the Category 19 Corus Chess Tournament in Wijk aan Zee with Veselin Topalov and Levon Aronian, ahead of Kramnik and Anand. He scored five wins, one loss and seven draws. Radjabov was also to play the Morelia/Linares Tournament 2007, but due to a robbery of some of his belongings in Mexico, he withdrew from the tournament. His position was taken by Vassily Ivanchuk.

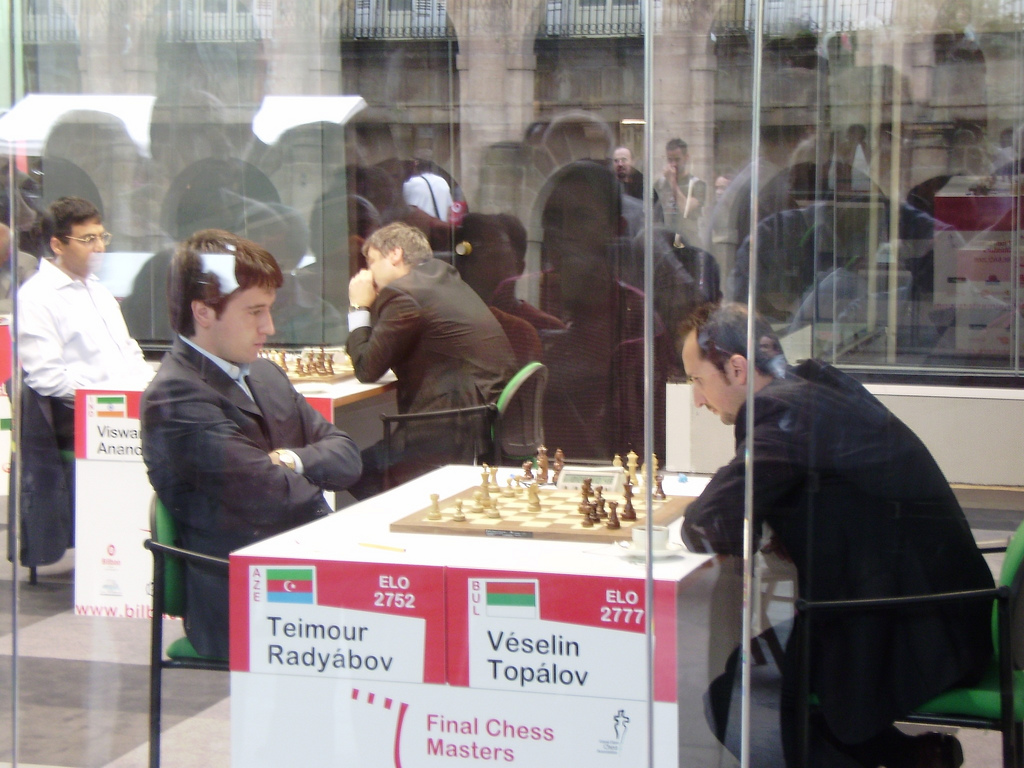
Radjabov versus Veselin Topalov in Bilbao, 2008

In January 2008, Radjabov won the ACP Rapid Cup in Odessa after beating Grischuk in the final 2½–1½. Later the same month he shared third in Wijk aan Zee together with World Champion Viswanathan Anand after beating him with white, finishing ½ from first (+3−1=9). Radjabov had an average Linares (+2−2=8), and a disappointing Baku (+2−3=8), but finished third in Sofia (+2−1=7), behind Ivanchuk and Topalov. In Sochi in August he finished second (+5−2=6) behind Aronian, and capped a very active tournament year by sharing first in Elista (+4−1=8).

In Wijk aan Zee Radjabov shared second place with Aronian and Sergei Movsesian, ½ behind winner Sergey Karjakin. He finished fifth on tiebreak in Linares after scoring his only win in the tournament against Aronian, and was undefeated in Bazna in June, even if he only won once, against Gata Kamsky. In October Radjabov led the Azerbaijani team to victory at the European Team Chess Championship in Novi Sad.

=== Early 2010s ===
In May Radjabov shared second place in Astrakhan, securing second place in the FIDE Grand Prix 2008–2010, thereby qualifying for the Candidates tournament for the World Chess Championship 2012. In Bazna the following month Radjabov shared second place with Boris Gelfand after beating him in both their individual games (Carlsen won the tournament). Radjabov finished in second place also in the World Blitz Championship, with 24/38. Aronian won with 24½ while Carlsen was third with 23½. In his 2011 Candidates quarterfinal in Kazan, Radjabov was eliminated by Vladimir Kramnik in the blitz tiebreak, after a controversial incident of chess clock malfunction.

Radjabov got married on October 7 after a spectacular performance rating of 3019 in the European Chess Cup Championships playing first board for the team SOCAR, with the team coming second overall. Later the same month, Radjabov led the Azerbaijani team to silver medal at the European Team Chess Championship in Porto Carras. In November, he reached a new peak rating of 2781.

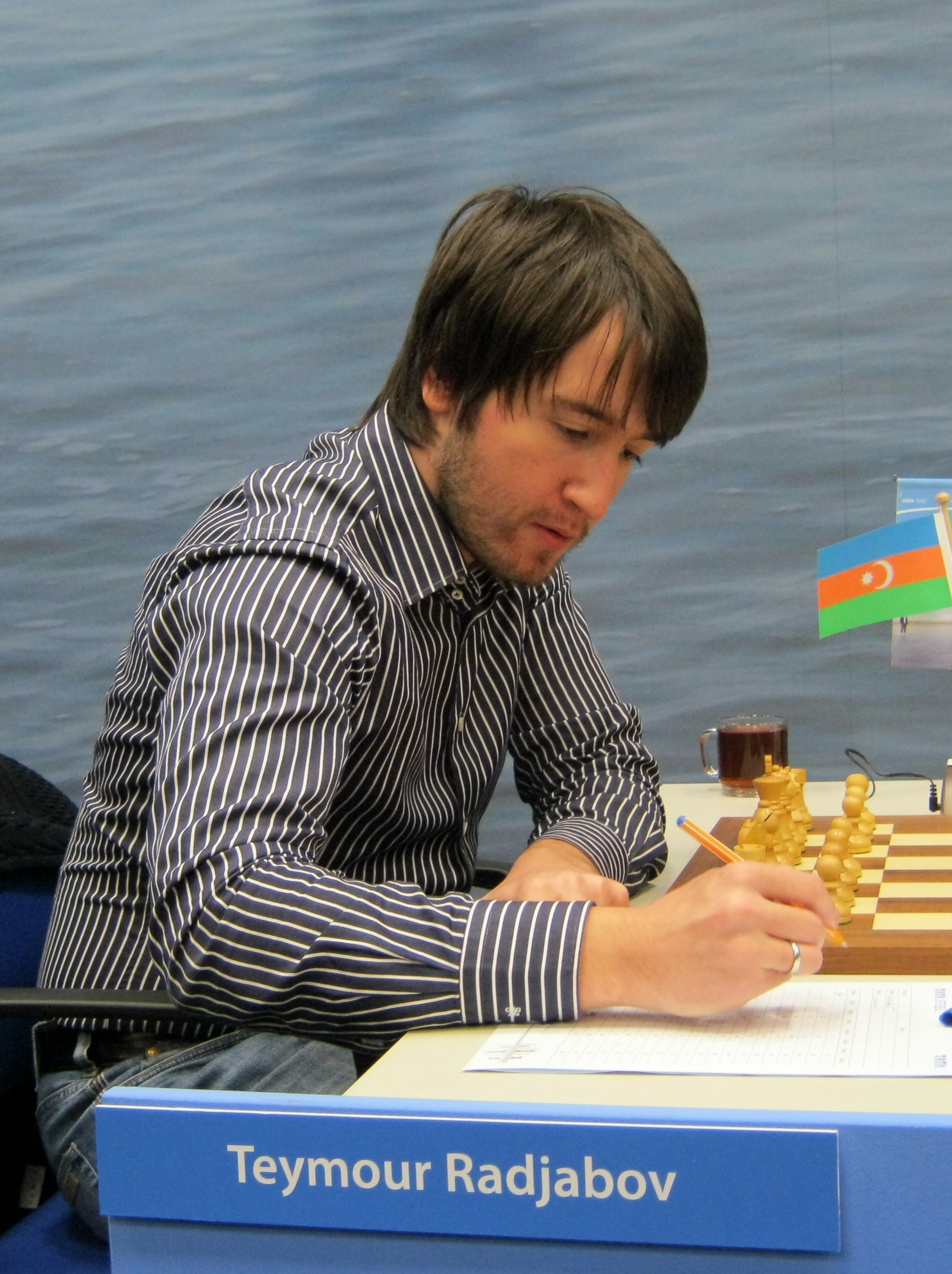
Radjabov playing in 2012

In January, Radjabov competed in the Tata Steel Chess Tournament in Wijk aan Zee; the field included among others, world No. 1 Magnus Carlsen and world No. 2 Levon Aronian. The average rating of the field was 2755, making this thirteen-round event a category 21 tournament. Radjabov scored +3−0=10 and tied for second place with Magnus Carlsen and Fabiano Caruana, a point behind winner Levon Aronian. It was his fourth consecutive top three finishes in Wijk. In the even stronger Tal Memorial (category 22 with an average rating of 2776) he shared second place again (+2−1=6), behind winner Carlsen, and reached a new peak rating and ranking as No. 4 with 2788 on the July list. Radjabov also competed as first board in the 2012 Olympiad in Istanbul Turkey 2012, and as a result pushed his rating from 2788 to his personal all-time high of 2793, and received second-highest performance on the first board. On October 17th, Radjabov led the SOCAR chess team to a win in the European Chess Club Cup by playing on the first board, and again received the second-highest performance on his board.

Radjabov played in the 2013 Candidates Tournament, which took place in London, from 15 March to 1 April. He finished last, with +1−7=6.

Radjabov's national team won at the European Team Chess Championship in November 2013 in Warsaw, Poland. Radjabov scored 4½/8 (+1−0=7) in the tournament.

=== Return to top chess ===
Radjabov returned to top chess at the inaugural Gashimov Memorial, also known as Shamkir Chess, commemorating the late Azeri grandmaster. Radjabov scored 5/10 and placed third behind Carlsen and Caruana, picking up 11 rating points. He defeated Magnus Carlsen in their individual game. Radjabov participated in the Tata Steel Chess Tournament and placed eighth out of 14 with 6/13 points. In the same year, he won the bronze medal at the World Rapid Chess Championship behind Carlsen and Ian Nepomniachtchi. In 2016, Radjabov played in numerous tournaments such as the Gashimov Memorial, European Club Cup, World Blitz and Rapid Championship and Chess Olympiad without winning any tournaments. In April, Radjabov competed in the annual Shamkir Chess tournament and finished 8th out of 10 players.

Radjabov competed in the FIDE Grand Prix 2017. He placed fourth out of 18 in the Moscow round in May. In July, Radjabov won clear first in the Geneva round by scoring 6/9 points. In the final of his three tournaments, he scored 5/9 points. This put Radjabov third in the overall Grand Prix ranking, meaning he narrowly missed qualifying for the 2018 Candidates Tournament; with an extra 1/2 point in the final tournament he would have finished in the Grand Prix top two, and qualified.

In the September 2017 ranking of FIDE, Radjabov was ranked as no. 19 in the world. This was the first time since October 2015 when Radjabov was able to enter the top 20 in the list. The following month, he climbed to no. 17, his highest ranking in more than four years. In November, Radjabov won the gold medals at the European Team Chess Championship with the Azerbaijan national team and earned an individual silver medal on the second board. In April 2018, Radjabov participated in the fifth edition of Shamkir Chess, finishing seventh with a score of 4½/9 (+0–0=9). He gained three rating points and reached #16 in the May FIDE world rankings, his highest ranking in more than 5 years. In the 43rd Chess Olympiad in Batumi, Radjabov played for Azerbaijan and scored +6−0=4 with a notable victory over Wesley So. Team Azerbaijan completed the tournament as #15 while Radjabov earned an individual bronze medal on board 2. He also earned six rating points and moved to #14 in the world rankings.

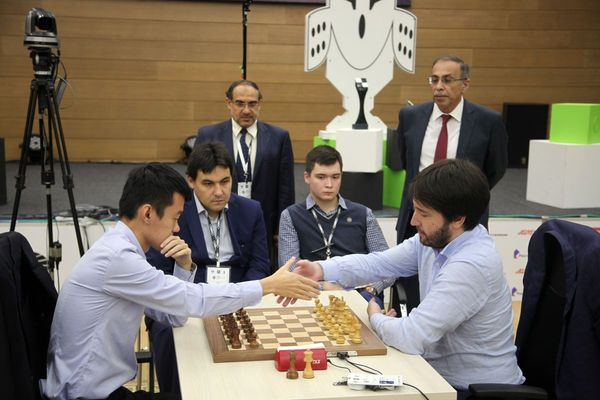
Radjabov facing Ding Liren at the 2019 Chess World Cup, 4 October 2019

In January 2019, Radjabov returned to Tata Steel Chess Tournament and placed seventh by earning 6.5 points (+1−1=11). In April, Radjabov played in Shamkir Chess for the fifth time. He also continued his rally in the world rankings and reached #12. In May, Teimour played in the Moscow round of 2019 FIDE Grand Prix, and was eliminated from the Moscow Grand Prix tournament in the first round on tie-breaks by American grandmaster Hikaru Nakamura. During the Hamburg round in November, Radjabov was eliminated by Daniil Dubov in the first round tie-breaks. In December, Radjabov missed the Jerusalem round for health reasons.

In July, Teimour played in Dortmund Sparkassen Chess Meeting and placed joint second-fifth places with four points (+1−0=6). In September, Radjabov participated in and won the 2019 Chess World Cup in Khanty-Mansiysk. After eliminating Ziska, Sjugirov and Yuffa in the first three rounds, Radjabov faced fellow Azerbaijani grandmaster Shakhriyar Mamedyarov in round 4 and defeated him in the tie-break series. Radjabov then beat American grandmaster Jeffery Xiong in the quarterfinal, 1.5 to 0.5. In the semifinal, Radjabov defeated French grandmaster Maxime Vachier-Lagrave. The final took place on 4 October 2019, in which he drew against Ding Liren in the classical games (+1-1=2); in the tie-breaks, he drew the four games in the rapid section, then defeated him in the blitz section (+2-0=0).

As a result of reaching the final in the World Cup, Radjabov qualified for the 2020 Candidates tournament where he could have earned the right to play Magnus Carlsen in the World Chess Championship.

=== Withdrawal from Candidates ===
Citing concerns about the coronavirus pandemic and what he considered FIDE's inadequate attempts to deal with it, Radjabov withdrew from the 2020 Candidates tournament on March 6, 2020. He was replaced by Maxime Vachier-Lagrave.

On March 26, the tournament was abruptly postponed as a result of new governmental policies aimed at containing the pandemic. This development prompted Radjabov to call for his reinstatement in the tournament. In an interview with Daniel Rensch and Robert Hess, he stated:

"I think FIDE should take some action to include me back into the tournament, that's what I think. I think it's a fair decision. From my side, I think I have done everything possible. I just asked them, warned them, I also warned the chess community by expressing it openly. (...)". Members of the Azerbaijani national chess team signed an open letter in support of his reinstatement.

In November 2020, Radjabov participated in the Skilling Open rapid chess tournament, which was the first tournament as part of Champions Chess Tour 2021. Radjabov qualified to the quarterfinals by earning eight points in 15 games, and was eliminated by Wesley So. In December, Radjabov joined Airthings Masters, the second tournament of the Champions Chess Tour. Radjabov placed fifth among 12 players in the preliminary round by performing +1-0=10, and qualified to the play-offs. In the quarter-finals, he defeated Ian Nepomniachtchi on the Armageddon round after drawing all of their games. In the semifinals, Radjabov defeated Russian grandmaster Daniil Dubov, who had upset then-world chess champion and tournament favorite Magnus Carlsen in the quarter-finals. In the finals he defeated Levon Aronian in two sets, and was declared the winner of the Airthings Masters.

In May 2021, FIDE decided to give Radjabov direct entry into the Candidates Tournament 2022, where he obtained third place.

== Notable tournament results ==
- 1998 Kasparov Cup, 1st
- 1998 World Youth Chess Championship U-12, 1st
- 1999 European Youth Chess Championship U-18, 1st
- 2000 Budapest Chess Tournament, 1st
- 2005 Dos Hermanas, 1st
- 2005 European Individual Chess Championship, 2nd
- 2006 Cap d'agde Rapid Chess, 1st
- 2006 World Blitz Championship, 3rd
- 2007 Tata Steel Chess Tournament, joint 1st
- 2008 Elista FIDE Grand Prix, 1st
- 2009 European Team Chess Championship, team 1st
- 2010 World Blitz Championship, 2nd
- 2013 European Team Chess Championship, team 1st
- 2015 World Rapid Championship, joint 2nd
- 2017 Geneva FIDE Grand Prix, 1st
- 2017 European Team Chess Championship, team 1st
- 2019 Chess World Cup, 1st
- 2020–2021 Airthings Masters, 1st
- 2021 Opera Euro Rapid, 3rd
- 2021 Champions Chess Tour Final, 2nd
- 2022 Candidates Tournament, 3rd

== Playing style ==
Radjabov is almost single-handedly responsible for the current revival of the King's Indian Defence. He even beat world No. 1, Magnus Carlsen, with this defense in 2014 at the Gashimov Memorial 2014. He is also the only top player to consistently employ the sharp Schliemann–Jaenisch Gambit in the Ruy Lopez, scoring +1−0=10 with it in top tournaments 2008–2011, drawing among others Carlsen, Anand, Topalov, Svidler, Ivanchuk and Karjakin, and beating Adams. Radjabov has been called an excellent counter-attacker, adept at seizing control after an opponent makes a minor mistake.

At the 2003 Linares chess tournament, Radjabov, who was 15 years old, defeated Kasparov with the black pieces. Radjabov had a bad position (diagram), but played a courageous piece sacrifice that disconcerted Kasparov. Faced suddenly with an unbalanced position that required calm defense, Kasparov blundered with 27. Rdf1??, losing a piece and the game.

Kasparov vs. Radjabov, Linares 2003

Position: h1 white rook, e1 white king, a1 white rook, h2 white pawn, e2 white bishop, d2 white queen, b2 white pawn, g3 white knight, c3 white pawn, a3 white pawn, g4 black knight, f4 white bishop, d4 white pawn, c4 black pawn, e5 white pawn, d5 black pawn, b5 black pawn, e6 black pawn, c6 black knight, b6 black queen, a6 black pawn, g7 black pawn, e7 black bishop, h8 black rook, d8 black rook, c8 black king

Position after 21.Be2. Radjabov (Black) surprises Kasparov by sacrificing a knight for the initiative.

The game was controversially voted the most beautiful game of the tournament. Proponents praised Radjabov's resiliency and courage against the reigning world No. 1; detractors argued that Radjabov was losing, and it was only because Kasparov blundered that he won the game. Radjabov's knight sacrifice, 21...Ngxe5, was praised by several strong players for its bravery, including English grandmaster Nigel Short:

Radjabov plays very imaginatively... he just won't give up, he is extremely tenacious and will always find a way to muddy the waters to throw you off track. He is very good at finding disconcerting moves. Here he unbalances Kasparov completely, disturbing his rhythm of play... That was the point of Radjabov's sacrifice – it was not sound but it gave him these practical chances.

However, the sacrifice was called "desperation" by GM Miguel Illescas, and according to Chessbase.com, "The Grandmasters we have talked to praised Radjabov's resilience in a bad position but criticized the game as unworthy of a prize because it was based on blunders."

Radjabov became the first player born since Kasparov first became World Chess Champion in 1985, to defeat him. Radjabov is also the youngest player in history to defeat a reigning world No. 1 in a game at tournament time controls.

== UNICEF ==
In May 2006, Radjabov was appointed as the UNICEF National Goodwill Ambassador for Azerbaijan. He advocates for the cause of the universal salt iodization in the country. UNICEF Representative in Azerbaijan Hanaa Singer stated that they were very pleased to have Radjabov in the work to improve the lives of children and young people in Azerbaijan. They were confident that Radjabov would become an outspoken and active advocate for the cause, using his great talents to inspire young people.

== See also ==
- List of Azerbaijani chess players
