= Vladislav Artemiev =

Russian chess grandmaster (born 1998)

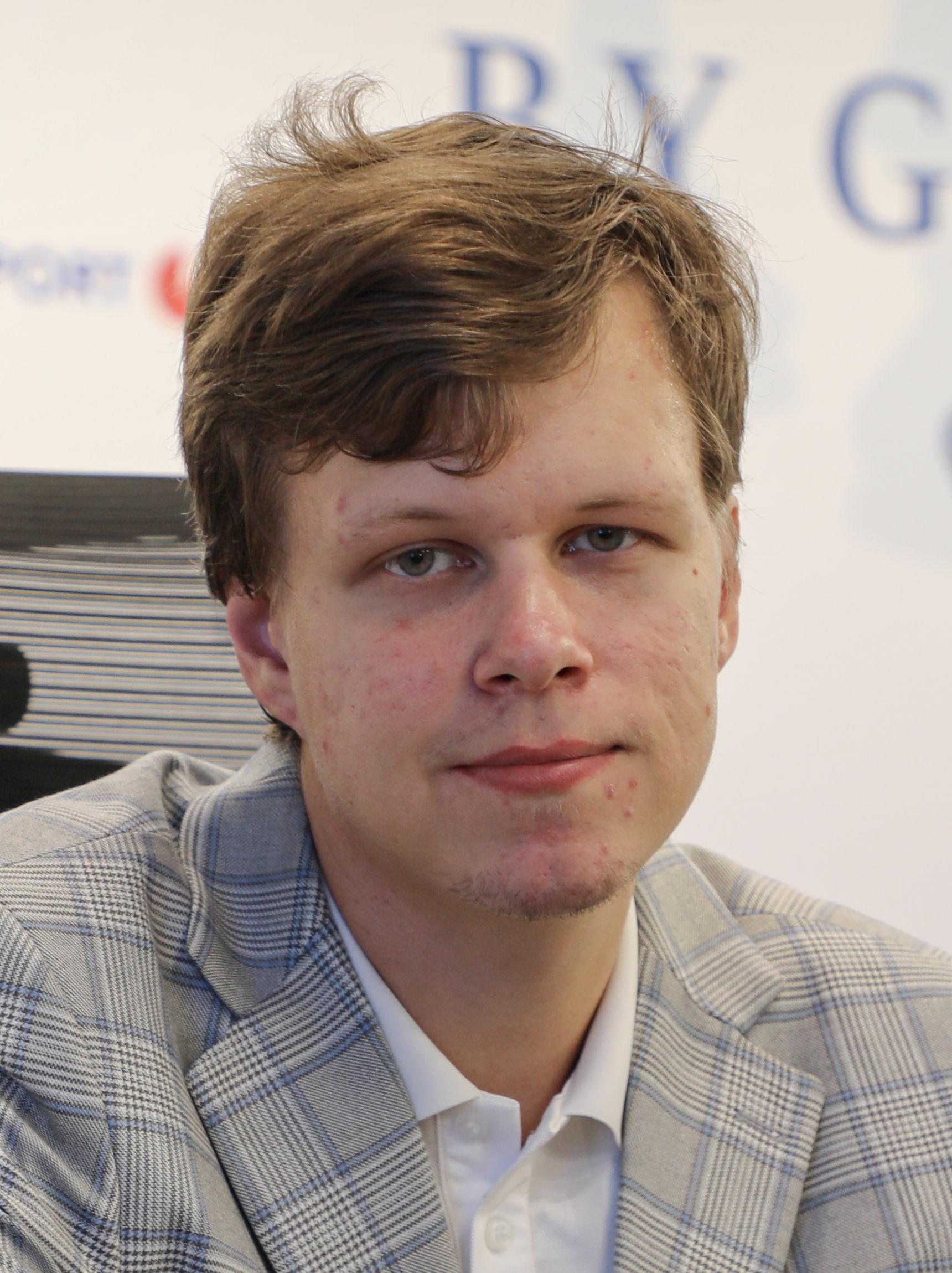
- Artemiev in 2026

Personal information
- Born: Vladislav Mikhailovich Artemiev; 5 March 1998 (age 28) Omsk, Russia

Chess career
- Country: Russia (until 2022); FIDE (since 2022)
- Title: Grandmaster (2014)
- FIDE rating: 2653 (September 2026)
- Peak rating: 2761 (June 2019)
- Ranking: No. 65 (September 2026)
- Peak ranking: No. 10 (June 2019)

Vladislav Mikhailovich Artemiev (Russian: Владисла́в Миха́йлович Арте́мьев; born 5 March 1998) is a Russian chess grandmaster and former chess prodigy. He was awarded the title of Grandmaster in 2014. Artemiev is the 2019 European Chess Champion. He won the individual board performance gold medal as well as team gold medal at World Team Chess Championship 2019. He participated in Chess World Cup 2015, 2017, 2019 and 2021 where he was knocked out in the round of 16 by Sergey Karjakin.

== Chess career ==
Artemiev started playing chess at the age of seven. He won the bronze medal in the Under 14 division of the European Youth Chess Championships in 2011. He won twice the World's Youth Stars - Vanya Somov Memorial, a round-robin tournament for juniors in Kirishi, in 2012 and 2013. In 2013, he also won the Russian Junior Championship.

Artemiev played for the Russian team at the World Youth Under-16 Chess Olympiads of 2012 and 2013. At the 2012 event, he helped his team to win the gold medal and also won the individual silver medal for his performance on board three. In the following year, he won the team silver and the individual gold for the best performance on board one (2580).

In 2014 he won the Andranik Margaryan Memorial in Armenia and the Moscow Open F Group (Student Grandmaster Cup), a category 12 round-robin tournament, with a score of 8/9 points (+7–0=2) for a performance rating of 2869.

In March 2015, Artemiev won the 9th Georgy Agzamov Memorial in Tashkent on tiebreak over Vladislav Tkachiev. In July 2015, he won the Russian Championship Higher League and as a result qualified for the Russian Championship Superfinal. In this latter event he scored 5½/11 points. He also competed in the Chess World Cup 2015, where he defeated Surya Shekhar Ganguly in the first round before being eliminated in the second by Radosław Wojtaszek.

In 2016, Artemiev shared first place with Vidit Santosh Gujrathi, finishing second on tiebreak, in the Lake Sevan tournament in Martuni, Armenia, and finished runner-up in the World Junior Chess Championship. In October 2016, he won the Russian Blitz Chess Championship with a score of 18/22, two-and-a-half points ahead of his closest followers, Dmitry Andreikin and Alexander Morozevich.

In September 2017, Artemiev competed in the Chess World Cup 2017. He defeated Benjamin Bok and Teimour Radjabov in rounds one and two, respectively, then was knocked out by Daniil Dubov in the third round. In October, Artemiev won the Russian Blitz Championship again with 15½/20 points. In December 2017, he won the gold medal in the men's blitz chess event of the IMSA Elite Mind Games in Huai'an, China ahead of Ding Liren, Shakhriyar Mamedyarov, Dmitry Andreikin and beating Alexander Grischuk on better tiebreaks with a 16/22 score.

In February 2018, he participated in the Aeroflot Open. He finished sixth out of ninety-two, scoring 6/9 (+4–1=4), thus becoming a 2700+ rated player for the first time in his career. In December, he won the European Blitz Championship in Skopje with a score of 18½/22 points, one-and-a-half points ahead of runner-up Ivan Cheparinov. In October 2018, He won both Russian Blitz Championship as well as the Russian Rapid Championship.

Artemiev won the Gibraltar Masters in January 2019, taking clear first with 8½/10 (+7–0=3) with a performance rating of 2941 defeating Hikaru Nakamura, Yu Yangyi and David Navara. He represented Russia at the 2019 World Team Chess Championship in March, scoring 6½/8 (+5–0=3) with a 2839 performance rating as Russia won gold. His performance led to Alexander Grischuk stating that he may be the successor of the recently retired Vladimir Kramnik in the Russian team. Later in the same month, Artemiev won the European Individual Championship in Skopje edging out Nils Grandelius on tiebreak, after both players scored 8½/11 points. In July, he won the 20th International Karpov Tournament ahead of Wang Hao and Dmitry Jakovenko.

In 2019, Artemiev reached the semi-finals of the 2019 Chess.com Speed Chess Championship defeating Levon Aronian and Alexander Grischuk. He was knocked out in the quarter-finals of the 2020 edition by Magnus Carlsen with a 9.5-11 score after defeating Anish Giri. In 2021, Artemiev won the online Katara International bullet chess tournament on Lichess by beating Andrew Tang in the finals who had knocked out Magnus Carlsen and won three titled Tuesday events on Chess.com within 4 weeks. He participated in 3 legs of the Champions Chess Tour 2021, where he lost to Levon Aronian in the finals of GoldMoney Asian Rapid leg and finished second in AimChess US Rapid leg as well after losing to Magnus Carlsen in the finals. He lost to Wesley So in semi finals of the Chessable Masters leg but defeated Levon Aronian to finish third. He also defeated Magnus Carlsen 2–1 in the tour finals.

In 2021, Artemiev finished at 7/11 in FIDE Grand Swiss Tournament 2021 one point behind the leader, and won the Russian Blitz Championship with a 12/13 score. He also scored 14/21 in World Blitz Chess Championship 2021 finishing one point behind the leader. In 2022, Artemiev won the Moscow Open with a score 7.5 out of 9 on better tie breaks, and finished at 6.5/9 alongside Sanan Sjugirov in Russian Higher League, taking silver on tie breaks. In October 2022, he won the Russian Rapid Championship with a 9.5/11 score. In October 2023, he won the 76th Russian Championship with a score of 8.5 out of 11. The following year, in August 2024, he successfully defended his title by winning the 77th Russian Championship. He placed shared second in the World Rapid Chess Championship 2025 (along with Arjun Erigaisi, Hans Niemann, and Leinier Domínguez) with a score of 9.5/13, winning the silver medal on tiebreaks.

== Notable games ==
- Vladislav Artemiev vs Denis Khismatullin, European Individual Championships (2014), King's Indian Attack (A07), 1-0
- Mikhail Kobalia vs Vladislav Artemiev, Russian Team Championships (2014), Sicilian Defense: Scheveningen Variation (B81), 0-1
- Vladislav Artemiev vs Magnus Carlsen, FIDE World Rapid Chess Championship (2025) 1-0
