= Prague Chess Festival =

Chess tournament

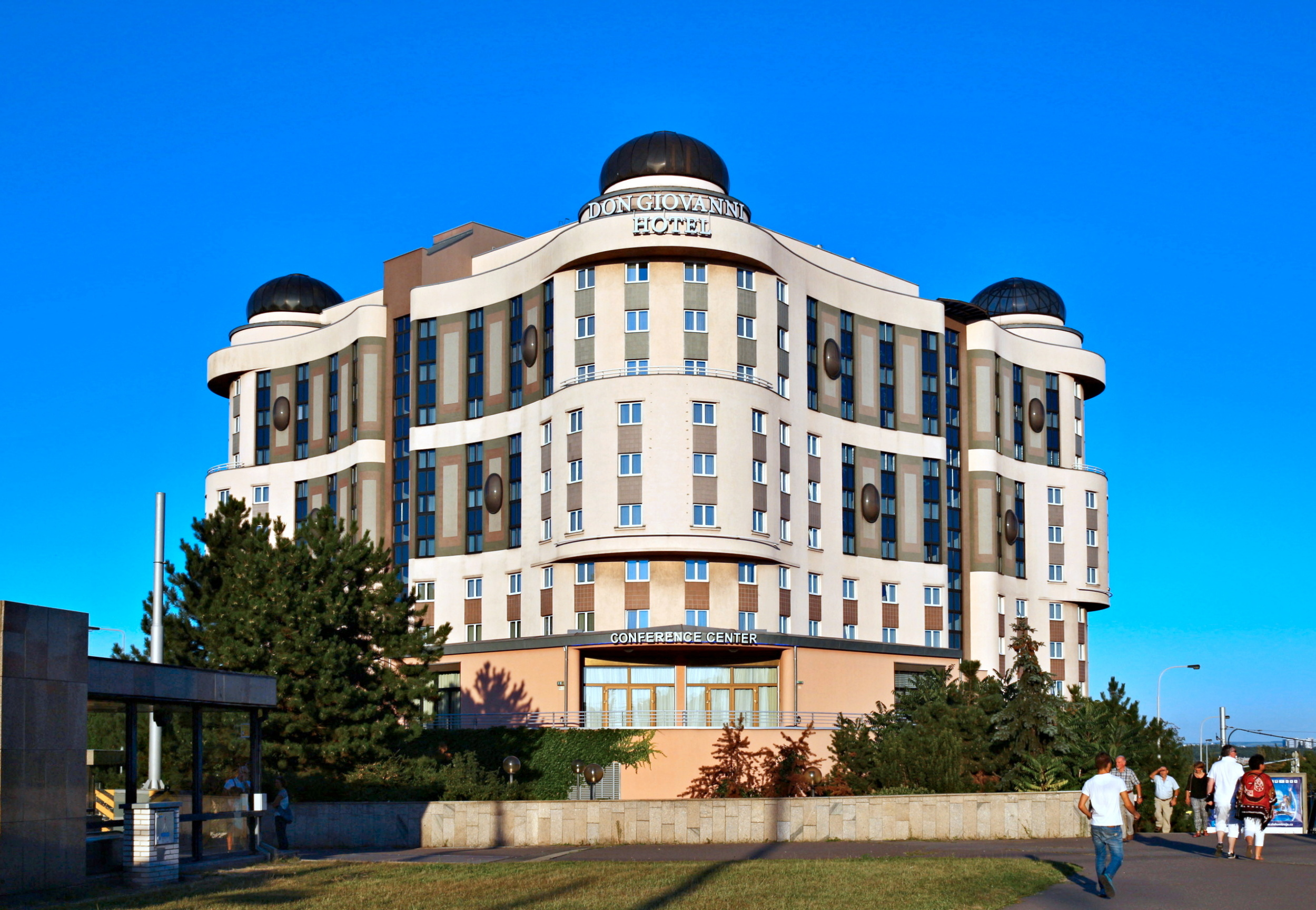
Don Giovanni Hotel in Prague, the playing venue of the festival

The Prague International Chess Festival, abbreviated as PICF, is an annual chess tournament that takes place in Prague, Czech Republic, since 2019.

It consists of several separate groups including Masters, Challengers, and Futures (organized under the round-robin system), an open tournament (held using the Swiss system), and a series of side tournaments. The winner of Challengers group receives an invitation to the Masters group the following year, while the winner of the open tournament receives an invitation to the Challengers group. The festival is organized by the Nový Bor Chess Club and the playing venue is the Don Giovanni Hotel in Prague.

== Participants and winners ==
The average rating of the Masters group is usually around 2700 and the average rating of the Challengers group is about 2550. The tournament has featured a number of participants of the Candidates Tournament, including Alireza Firouzja, Richárd Rapport, Vidit Gujrathi, Gukesh Dommaraju, R Praggnanandhaa, Wang Hao, Jan-Krzysztof Duda, Nijat Abasov, the World Chess Championship 2012 challenger Boris Gelfand and Women's World Chess Champion Ju Wenjun.

In each group there is a couple of Czech players nominated by the Chess Federation of the Czech Republic.

Winners of the Masters group:

#	Year	Winner(s)
1	2019	Nikita Vitiugov (Russia)
2	2020	Alireza Firouzja (FIDE)
3	2021	Sam Shankland (USA)
4	2022	Pentala Harikrishna (India)
5	2023	Ray Robson (USA)
6	2024	Nodirbek Abdusattorov (Uzbekistan)
7	2025	Aravindh Chithambaram (India)
8	2026	Nodirbek Abdusattorov (Uzbekistan)

Winners of the Challengers group:

#	Year	Winner(s)
1	2019	David Antón Guijarro (Spain)
2	2020	Jorden van Foreest (Netherlands)
	2021	cancelled due to COVID-19 pandemic
3	2022	Vincent Keymer (Germany)
4	2023	Mateusz Bartel (Poland)
5	2024	Ediz Gurel (Turkey)
6	2025	Nodirbek Yakubboev (Uzbekistan)
7	2026	Václav Finěk (Czech Republic)

== 2019 ==
=== Masters ===
	Player	Rating	1	2	3	4	5	6	7	8	9	10	Points
1	Nikita Vitiugov (Russia)	2726		½	½	1	½	½	1	½	½	½	5½
2	Vidit Gujrathi (India)	2711	½		½	½	1	0	½	½	1	½	5
3	Radosław Wojtaszek (Poland)	2722	½	½		½	½	½	½	1	½	½	5
4	Jan-Krzysztof Duda (Poland)	2731	0	½	½		½	½	0	1	1	1	5
5	Boris Gelfand (Israel)	2655	½	0	½	½		1	1	½	½	½	5
6	Sam Shankland (United States)	2731	½	1	½	½	0		½	½	½	½	4½
7	Pentala Harikrishna (India)	2730	0	½	½	1	0	½		½	½	½	4
8	Richárd Rapport (Hungary)	2738	½	½	0	0	½	½	½		½	1	4
9	David Navara (Czech Republic)	2739	½	0	½	0	½	½	½	½		1	4
10	Viktor Láznička (Czech Republic)	2670	½	½	½	0	½	½	½	0	0		3

=== Challengers ===
	Player	Rating	1	2	3	4	5	6	7	8	9	10	Points
1	David Antón Guijarro (Spain)	2643		½	½	0	½	1	1	½	1	1	6
2	Jan Krejčí (Czech Republic)	2570	½		½	0	½	½	1	1	½	1	5½
3	Ju Wenjun (China)	2580	½	½		1	1	0	½	0	1	½	5
4	Peter Michalik (Czech Republic)	2565	1	1	0		½	½	½	1	0	½	5
5	Jiří Štoček (Czech Republic)	2592	½	½	0	½		1	½	½	0	1	4½
6	Alexei Shirov (Spain)	2667	0	½	1	½	0		½	0	1	1	4½
7	Thai Dai Van Nguyen (Czech Republic)	2546	0	0	½	½	½	½		½	1	½	4
8	R Praggnanandhaa (India)	2532	½	0	1	0	½	1	½		½	0	4
9	David Paravyan (Russia)	2627	0	½	0	1	1	0	0	½		1	4
10	Mateusz Bartel (Poland)	2600	0	0	½	½	0	0	½	1	0		2½

== 2020 ==
=== Masters ===
	Player	Rating	1	2	3	4	5	6	7	8	9	10	Points	Tie-break
1	Alireza Firouzja (FIDE)	2726		0	1	½	½	½	1	½	½	½	5	2
2	Vidit Gujrathi (India)	2721	1		0	½	1	½	½	1	0	½	5	0
3	Jan-Krzysztof Duda (Poland)	2755	0	1		½	½	½	½	½	1	½	5	
4	David Antón Guijarro (Spain)	2697	½	½	½		½	0	½	½	1	1	5	
5	Sam Shankland (United States)	2683	½	0	½	½		1	½	½	½	1	5	
6	Nikita Vitiugov (Russia)	2731	½	½	½	1	0		½	½	½	½	4½	
7	Pentala Harikrishna (India)	2713	0	½	½	½	½	½		½	1	½	4½	
8	Markus Ragger (Austria)	2670	½	0	½	½	½	½	½		½	½	4	
9	David Navara (Czech Republic)	2717	½	1	0	0	½	½	0	½		1	4	
10	Nils Grandelius (Sweden)	2659	½	½	½	0	0	½	½	½	0		3	

=== Challengers ===
	Player	Rating	1	2	3	4	5	6	7	8	9	10	Points
1	Jorden van Foreest (Netherlands)	2667		½	½	½	½	1	1	½	½	1	6
2	Nijat Abasov (Azerbaijan)	2670	½		1	1	0	½	½	½	1	½	5½
3	Andrey Esipenko (Russia)	2654	½	0		1	½	½	½	1	1	½	5½
4	Kacper Piorun (Poland)	2611	½	0	0		1	1	½	½	1	½	5
5	Mateusz Bartel (Poland)	2639	½	1	½	0		½	½	½	½	1	5
6	Hannes Stefánsson (Iceland)	2529	0	½	½	0	½		½	1	1	1	5
7	Thai Dai Van Nguyen (Czech Republic)	2560	0	½	½	½	½	½		1	½	½	4½
8	Lukáš Černoušek (Czech Republic)	2442	½	0	½	½	½	0	0		1	½	3½
9	Tadeáš Kriebel (Czech Republic)	2524	½	0	0	0	½	0	½	0		1	2½
10	Jan Krejčí (Czech Republic)	2559	0	½	½	½	0	0	½	½	0		2½

== 2021 ==
=== Masters ===
	Player	Rating	1	2	3	4	5	6	7	8	Points
1	Sam Shankland (United States)	2691		1	½	½	1	½	1	1	5½
2	Jan-Krzysztof Duda (Poland)	2729	0		1	½	½	1	1	1	5
3	Radosław Wojtaszek (Poland)	2687	½	0		½	1	½	½	1	4
4	Thai Dai Van Nguyen (Czech Republic)	2577	½	½	½		½	½	½	½	3½
5	Nijat Abasov (Azerbaijan)	2665	0	½	0	½		1	½	1	3½
6	Nils Grandelius (Sweden)	2670	½	0	½	½	0		½	½	2½
7	Jorden van Foreest (Netherlands)	2701	0	0	½	½	½	½		½	2½
8	David Navara (Czech Republic)	2697	0	0	0	½	0	½	½		1½

== 2022 ==
=== Masters ===
	Player	Rating	1	2	3	4	5	6	7	8	9	10	Points
1	Pentala Harikrishna (India)	2701		½	½	½	½	½	1	1	1	1	6½
2	Lê Quang Liêm (Vietnam)	2709	½		½	1	1	½	½	½	1	½	6
3	Thai Dai Van Nguyen (Czech Republic)	2610	½	½		½	½	½	½	½	½	1	5
4	Sam Shankland (United States)	2718	½	0	½		½	½	½	1	1	½	5
5	David Navara (Czech Republic)	2681	½	0	½	½		½	½	½	1	1	5
6	Francisco Vallejo Pons (Spain)	2703	½	½	½	½	½		½	0	½	1	4½
7	Vidit Gujrathi (India)	2723	0	½	½	½	½	½		½	½	½	4
8	Parham Maghsoodloo (Iran)	2718	0	½	½	0	½	1	½		½	½	4
9	Salem Saleh (United Arab Emirates)	2679	0	0	½	0	0	½	½	½		1	3
10	David Antón Guijarro (Spain)	2692	0	½	0	½	0	0	½	½	0		2

=== Challengers ===
	Player	Rating	1	2	3	4	5	6	7	8	9	10	Points	TB
1	Vincent Keymer (Germany)	2675		½	½	1	½	1	½	½	1	1	6½	2
2	Hans Niemann (United States)	2678	½		½	1	½	1	1	0	1	1	6½	0
3	Nodirbek Abdusattorov (Uzbekistan)	2661	½	½		½	½	1	½	1	½	1	6	
4	Krishnan Sasikiran (India)	2635	0	0	½		½	½	½	1	1	1	5	
5	Jerguš Pecháč (Slovakia)	2598	½	½	½	½		½	0	1	½	0	4	
6	Max Warmerdam (Netherlands)	2613	0	0	0	½	½		1	0	1	1	4	
7	Marcin Krzyżanowski (Poland)	2535	½	0	½	½	1	0		1	0	0	3½	
8	Jiří Štoček (Czech Republic)	2541	½	1	0	0	0	1	0		½	½	3½	
9	Zbyněk Hráček (Czech Republic)	2564	0	0	½	0	½	0	1	½		½	3	
10	Peter Michalik (Czech Republic)	2577	0	0	0	0	1	0	1	½	½		3	

== 2023 ==
=== Masters ===
	Player	Rating	1	2	3	4	5	6	7	8	9	10	Points	Tie-break
1	Ray Robson (United States)	2689		0	½	½	½	½	1	1	1	½	5½	1½
2	Bogdan-Daniel Deac (Romania)	2693	1		½	½	½	½	½	½	½	1	5½	½
3	Pentala Harikrishna (India)	2704	½	½		½	½	½	½	1	½	½	5	
4	David Navara (Czech Republic)	2689	½	½	½		½	½	½	½	½	½	4½	
5	Sam Shankland (United States)	2711	½	½	½	½		½	½	½	½	½	4½	
6	Haik M. Martirosyan (Armenia)	2685	½	½	½	½	½		½	0	½	1	4½	
7	Vincent Keymer (Germany)	2690	0	½	½	½	½	½		1	½	½	4½	
8	Wang Hao (China)	2722	0	½	0	½	½	1	0		1	½	4	
9	Boris Gelfand (Israel)	2668	0	½	½	½	½	½	½	0		½	3½	
10	Thai Dai Van Nguyen (Czech Republic)	2653	½	0	½	½	½	0	½	½	½		3½	

=== Challengers ===
	Player	Rating	1	2	3	4	5	6	7	8	9	10	Points
1	Mateusz Bartel (Poland)	2609		½	1	½	½	½	½	1	1	1	6½
2	Alexander Motylev (Romania)	2597	½		½	1	½	½	½	1	1	½	6
3	Paulius Pultinevičius (Lithuania)	2530	0	½		1	½	0	1	½	½	1	5
4	Benjamin Gledura (Hungary)	2645	½	0	0		1	1	½	1	½	½	5
5	Jan Vykouk (Czech Republic)	2467	½	½	½	0		1	½	1	0	1	5
6	Erwin l'Ami (Netherlands)	2645	½	½	1	0	0		½	0	1	1	4½
7	Jerguš Pecháč (Slovakia)	2611	½	½	0	½	½	½		0	1	½	4
8	Václav Finěk (Czech Republic)	2409	0	0	½	0	0	1	1		0	1	3½
9	Richard Stalmach (Czech Republic)	2436	0	0	½	½	1	0	0	1		0	3
10	G. Akash (India)	2483	0	½	0	½	0	0	½	0	1		2½

== 2024 ==
=== Masters ===
	Player	Rating	1	2	3	4	5	6	7	8	9	10	Points
1	Nodirbek Abdusattorov (Uzbekistan)	2744		1	1	0	1	½	½	1	1	½	6½
2	Thai Dai Van Nguyen (Czech Republic)	2630	0		1	½	½	1	0	1	½	½	5
3	Parham Maghsoodloo (Iran)	2715	0	0		1	½	½	½	1	½	1	5
4	R Praggnanandhaa (India)	2747	1	½	0		½	0	½	½	1	1	5
5	David Navara (Czech Republic)	2667	0	½	½	½		½	1	½	½	½	4½
6	Richárd Rapport (Romania)	2717	½	0	½	1	½		½	½	½	½	4½
7	Gukesh D (India)	2743	½	1	½	½	0	½		0	1	½	4½
8	Mateusz Bartel (Poland)	2630	0	0	0	½	½	½	1		½	½	3½
9	Vincent Keymer (Germany)	2738	0	½	½	0	½	½	0	½		1	3½
10	Vidit Gujrathi (India)	2747	½	½	0	0	½	½	½	½	0		3

=== Challengers ===
	Player	Rating	1	2	3	4	5	6	7	8	9	10	Points
1	Ediz Gurel (Turkey)	2560		½	½	½	1	½	½	1	1	1	6½
2	Jaime Santos Latasa (Spain)	2612	½		½	½	1	1	½	½	½	1	6
3	Erwin l'Ami (Netherlands)	2636	½	½		½	0	½	1	1	1	½	5½
4	Abhimanyu Mishra (United States)	2627	½	½	½		0	½	½	1	1	1	5½
5	Anton Korobov (Ukraine)	2666	0	0	1	1		0	½	1	½	1	5
6	Maxim Rodshtein (Israel)	2590	½	0	½	½	1		½	1	0	½	4½
7	Richard Stalmach (Czech Republic)	2434	½	½	0	½	½	½		0	1	½	4
8	Vaishali Rameshbabu (India)	2481	0	½	0	0	0	0	1		1	½	3
9	Štěpán Hrbek (Czech Republic)	2426	0	½	0	0	½	1	0	0		½	2½
10	Václav Finěk (Czech Republic)	2429	0	0	½	0	0	½	½	½	½		2½

== 2025 ==
=== Masters ===
7th Prague Chess Festival Masters, 26 February–7 March 2025, Prague, Czech Republic, Category XIX (2706.2)
	Player	Rating	1	2	3	4	5	6	7	8	9	10	Points
1	Aravindh Chithambaram (India)	2729		1	1	½	1	½	½	½	½	½	6
2	Anish Giri (Netherlands)	2728	0		½	1	½	½	1	½	½	½	5
3	Wei Yi (China)	2755	0	½		½	0	½	1	1	½	1	5
4	Rameshbabu Praggnanandhaa (India)	2741	½	0	½		1	½	½	½	½	1	5
5	Vincent Keymer (Germany)	2731	0	½	1	0		½	1	½	½	½	4½
6	Ediz Gurel (Turkey)	2624	½	½	½	½	½		0	½	½	1	4½
7	Sam Shankland (USA)	2670	½	0	0	½	0	1		½	1	½	4
8	David Navara (Czech Republic)	2677	½	½	0	½	½	½	½		½	½	4
9	Le Quang Liem (Vietnam)	2739	½	½	½	½	½	½	0	½		½	4
10	Thai Dai Van Nguyen (Czech Republic)	2668	½	½	0	0	½	0	½	½	½		3

=== Challengers ===
6th Prague Chess Festival Challengers, 26 February–7 March 2025, Prague, Czech Republic, Category XIII (2555.2)
	Player	Rating	1	2	3	4	5	6	7	8	9	10	Points	Tie-break
1	Nodirbek Yakubboev (Uzbekistan)	2659		½	1	½	½	1	½	1	1	1	7	1½
2	Jonas Buhl Bjerre (Denmark)	2640	½		1	½	½	½	1	1	1	1	7	½
3	Marc'Andria Maurizzi (France)	2581	0	0		½	1	1	1	½	1	1	6	
4	Ma Qun (China)	2645	½	½	½		½	½	½	1	½	1	5½	
5	Václav Finěk (Czech Republic)	2478	½	½	0	½		0	½	½	1	½	4	
6	Iván Salgado López (Spain)	2599	0	½	0	½	1		½	½	1	0	4	
7	Stamatis Kourkoulos-Arditis (Greece)	2580	½	0	0	½	½	½		½	0	½	3	
8	Richard Stalmach (Czech Republic)	2478	0	0	½	0	½	½	½		0	1	3	
9	Divya Deshmukh (India)	2490	0	0	0	½	0	0	1	1		½	3	
10	Jáchym Němec (Czech Republic)	2433	0	0	0	0	½	1	½	0	½		2½	

== 2026 ==
=== Masters ===
8th Prague Chess Festival Masters, 24 February–6 March, 2026, Prague, Czech Republic, Category XIX (2710.4)
	Player	Rating	1	2	3	4	5	6	7	8	9	10	Points
1	Nodirbek Abdusattorov (Uzbekistan)	2751		½	1	½	1	½	½	½	1	½	6
2	Parham Maghsoodloo (Iran)	2708	½		½	1	0	½	1	½	½	½	5
3	Aravindh Chithambaram (India)	2700	0	½		1	1	½	0	1	1	0	5
4	Jorden van Foreest (Netherlands)	2705	½	0	0		½	1	1	1	1	0	5
5	David Navara (Czech Republic)	2628	0	1	0	½		1	½	½	½	½	4½
6	Nodirbek Yakubboev (Uzbekistan)	2691	½	½	½	0	0		1	½	½	1	4½
7	Vincent Keymer (Germany)	2776	½	0	1	0	½	0		½	½	1	4
8	Hans Niemann (United States)	2725	½	½	0	0	½	½	½		½	1	4
9	Gukesh Dommaraju (India)	2754	0	½	0	0	½	½	½	½		1	3½
10	David Antón Guijarro (Spain)	2666	½	½	1	1	½	0	0	0	0		3½

=== Challengers ===
7th Prague Chess Festival Challengers, 24 February–6 March, 2026, Prague, Czech Republic, Category XIII (2552)
	Player	Rating	1	2	3	4	5	6	7	8	9	10	Points
1	Václav Finěk (Czech Republic)	2538		1	½	½	½	1	1	½	1	½	6½
2	Daniil Yuffa (Spain)	2604	0		½	1	1	1	1	½	0	1	6
3	Divya Deshmukh (India)	2497	½	½		½	½	½	½	1	1	0	5
4	Benjámin Gledura (Hungary)	2652	½	0	½		1	1	0	0	1	½	4½
5	Jonas Buhl Bjerre (Denmark)	2629	½	0	½	0		½	1	½	½	1	4½
6	Jáchym Němec (Czech Republic)	2466	0	0	½	0	½		½	1	1	1	4½
7	Thomas Beerdsen (Netherlands)	2525	0	0	½	1	0	½		1	½	½	4
8	Surya Shekhar Ganguly (India)	2568	½	½	0	1	½	0	0		½	1	4
9	Štěpán Hrbek (Czech Republic)	2463	0	1	0	0	½	0	½	½		1	3½
10	Zhu Jiner (China)	2578	½	0	1	½	0	0	½	0	0		2½
