= Olga Sikorová =

Czech chess player (born 1975)

Personal information
- Born: 4 March 1975 (age 51)

Chess career
- Country: Czechoslovakia; Czech Republic
- Title: Woman Grandmaster (2013)
- Peak rating: 2308 (January 2002)

Olga Sikorová (born 4 March 1975), née Černá, is a Czech chess player who holds the title of Woman Grandmaster (WGM, 2013). She is a six-time winner of the Czech Women's Chess Championship (2000, 2001, 2002, 2004, 2014, 2018) and two-times individual bronze medalist of the European Women's Team Chess Championships (2005, 2013).

== Biography ==
In 1992, in Valtice Olga Sikorová shared first place (together with Lenka Ptáčníková) in the Moravian Juniors Chess Championship in U20 age group. In 1995, she won silver medal in Moravian Women's Chess Championship. In 1997, Olga Sikorová shared 3rd place (behind Olga Alexandrova and Dalia Blimke-Dereń) in Open chess tournament in Frýdek-Místek. In 2004, she shared 3rd place (behind Jiří Štoček and Zuzana Hagarová, together with Ján Plachetka and Martin Mrva) in Tatrzańskie Zręby. In 2007, in Ostróda Olga Sikorová shared 3rd place (behind Aleksander Miśta and Maciej Rutkowski, together with Mateusz Bronowicki) in Open chess tournament.

Olga Sikorová seven times won individual medals in Czech Women's Chess Championships: five gold (2001, 2002, 2004, 2014, 2018) and two silver (2003, 2010).

Olga Sikorová played for Czech Republic in the Women's Chess Olympiads:

- In 2000, at first reserve board in the 34th Chess Olympiad (women) in Istanbul (+5, =1, -4),
- In 2002, at third board in the 35th Chess Olympiad (women) in Bled (+6, =2, -3),
- In 2004, at second board in the 36th Chess Olympiad (women) in Calvià (+2, =1, -7),
- In 2006, at third board in the 37th Chess Olympiad (women) in Turin (+4, =4, -2),
- In 2010, at fourth board in the 39th Chess Olympiad (women) in Khanty-Mansiysk (+3, =3, -2),
- In 2014, at third board in the 41st Chess Olympiad (women) in Tromsø (+5, =4, -2),
- In 2016, at fourth board in the 42nd Chess Olympiad (women) in Baku (+3, =1, -5),
- In 2018, at reserve board in the 43rd Chess Olympiad (women) in Batumi (+6, =2, -1).

Olga Sikorová played for Czech Republic in the World Women's Team Chess Championship:

- In 2007, at second board in the 3rd Women's World Team Chess Championship 2007 in Yekaterinburg (+1, =1, -7).

Olga Sikorová played for Czech Republic in the European Women's Team Chess Championships:

- In 2001, at second board in the 4th European Team Chess Championship (women) in León (+3, =2, -2),
- In 2003, at second board in the 5th European Team Chess Championship (women) in Plovdiv (+3, =0, -3),
- In 2005, at third board in the 6th European Team Chess Championship (women) in Gothenburg (+6, =1, -2) and won individual bronze medal,
- In 2013, at reserve board in the 10th European Team Chess Championship (women) in Warsaw (+6, =2, -0) and won individual bronze medal,
- In 2015, at fourth board in the 11th European Team Chess Championship (women) in Reykjavík (+2, =3, -3).

In 1998, Olga Sikorová was awarded the FIDE Woman International Master (WIM) title and in 2013 she received the title of FIDE Woman Grandmaster (WGM).
