= Jan Vykouk =

Czech chess grandmaster (born 2000)

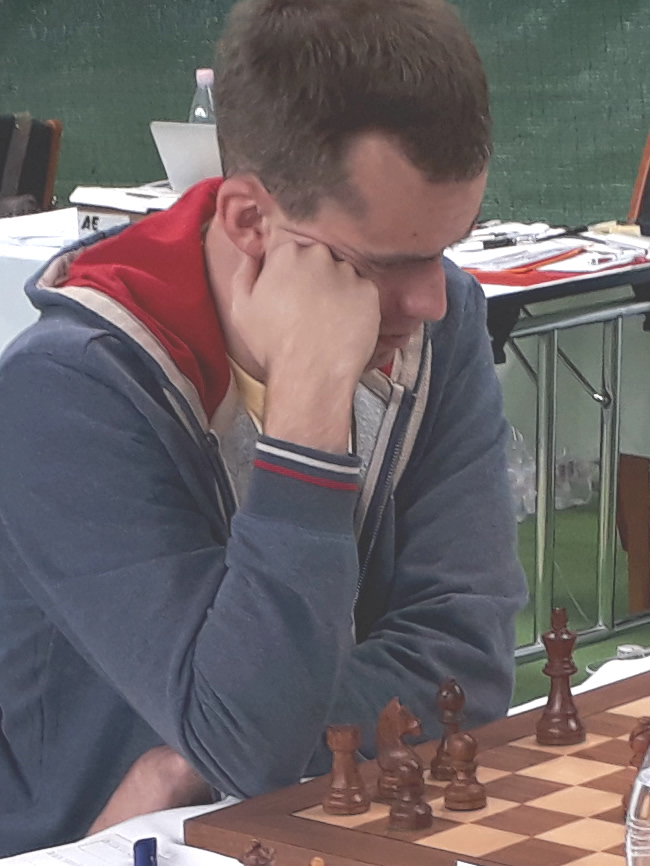
- Vykouk in 2019

Personal information
- Born: March 17, 2000 (age 26)

Chess career
- Country: Czech Republic
- Title: Grandmaster (2026)
- FIDE rating: 2531 (October 2026)
- Peak rating: 2553 (April 2026)

Jan Vykouk is a Czech chess grandmaster.

== Career ==
In August 2018, he won the silver medal in the U18 section of the European Youth Chess Championship 2018.

In June 2023, he played in the Challengers section of the Prague Chess Festival, where he defeated grandmaster Erwin l'Ami and held draws against grandmasters Mateusz Bartel, Alexander Motylev, and Paulius Pultinevičius.

In August 2025, he finished in second place in the Czech Chess Championship, behind unexpected winner Štěpán Hrbek.
