= Václav Finěk =

Czech chess grandmaster (born 2010)

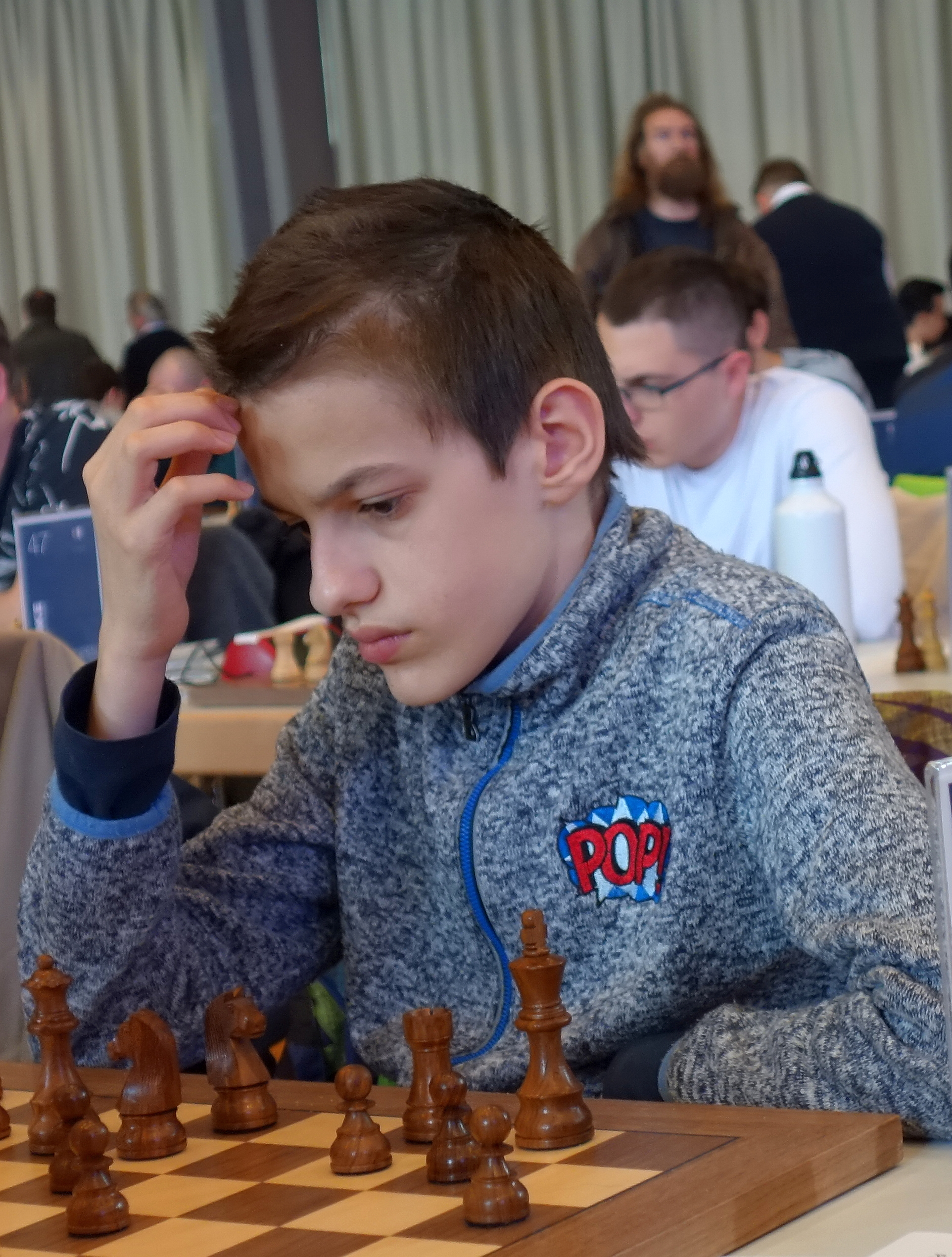
- Finěk in 2024

Personal information
- Born: 16 January 2010 (age 16) Liberec, Czech Republic

Chess career
- Country: Czech Republic
- Title: Grandmaster (2026)
- FIDE rating: 2587 (October 2026)
- Peak rating: 2609 (November 2026)

Václav Finěk (born 16 January 2010) is a Czech chess grandmaster.

== Chess career ==
In June 2023, he played in the Challengers section of the Prague Chess Festival, where he achieved wins against grandmasters Erwin l'Ami, Jerguš Pecháč, and G. Akash despite being the lowest seed.

In July 2024, he tied for first place with Ameya Audi in the Czech Open after defeating grandmaster Liviu-Dieter Nisipeanu in the final round. He won the championship after tiebreak scores.

In September 2024, he won the U14 section of the European Youth Chess Championship with a score of 8/9.

In March 2026, he played in the Challengers section of the Prague Chess Festival, and emerged as the winner going undefeated. He also achieved his final GM norm.

In May 2026, he tied for first place on 7.5/9 with David Navara at the Czech Chess Championship, and finished second after tiebreak scores.

In July 2026, he won the Biel Generations Challenge.
