= Štoček =

Štoček (feminine: Štočková) is a Czech and Slovak surname. Notable people with the surname include:

- Jiří Štoček (born 1977), Czech chess grandmaster
- Matúš Štoček (born 1999), Slovak cyclist
- Zuzana Štočková, birth name of Zuzana Hagarová (born 1977), Slovak chess player
