= Richard Stalmach =

Czech chess player (born 2006)

Personal information
- Born: 12 March 2006 (age 20) Frýdek-Místek, Czech Republic

Chess career
- Country: Czech Republic
- Title: International Master (2023)
- FIDE rating: 2456 (October 2026)
- Peak rating: 2464 (June 2024)

Richard Stalmach is a Czech chess player.

== Chess career ==
In August 2017, he was a co-leader of the U12 European Youth Chess Championship after the fourth round, ultimately finishing with 5/9.

In May 2022, he played in the Czech Chess Championship, scoring 5.5/9 and winning the prize for best junior player.

He has played in the Challengers section of the Prague Chess Festival three times. In 2023, he achieved draws against grandmasters Paulius Pultinevičius and Benjámin Gledura. In 2024, he held draws against grandmasters Ediz Gürel, Jaime Santos Latasa, Abhimanyu Mishra, and Anton Korobov. In 2025, he held draws against grandmasters Marc'Andria Maurizzi, Iván Salgado López, and Stamatis Kourkoulos-Arditis.
