= Petra Krupková =

Czech chess player (born 1976)

Personal information
- Born: 23 April 1976 (age 50) Kolín, Czech Republic

Chess career
- Country: Czechoslovakia; Czech Republic
- Title: Woman Grandmaster (2000)
- FIDE rating: 2303 (July 2006)
- Peak rating: 2349 (January 1999)

Petra Krupková (married names Movsesjanová and Mazaková, born 23 April 1976) is a Czech chess player who received the FIDE title of Woman Grandmaster (WGM) in 2000. She won the Czech Women's Chess Championship in 1993.

== Biography ==
In 1990, Krupková won the bronze medal at the Czechoslovak Youth Chess Championship in the U18 girl's age group. In 1992, she shared 4th place in the World Youth Chess Championship in the U16 girl's age group. In 1993, Krupková won the Czech Women's Chess Championship, but a year later she won bronze medal in this tournament. In 1995, in Poland, she shared first place with Monika Bobrowska in the Women's World Chess Championship Zonal tournament and won the right to take part in an Interzonal Tournament. In 1995, Krupková participated in Women's World Chess Championship Interzonal Tournament in Chişinău where ranked 15th place. In 1996, she won the bronze medal in the U20 European Junior Championship in Hungary.

She played for Czech Republic in the Women's Chess Olympiads:

- In 1996, at first board in the 32nd Chess Olympiad (women) in Yerevan (+2, =6, -3),
- In 1998, at first board in the 33rd Chess Olympiad (women) in Elista (+3, =6, -2),
- In 2000, at first board in the 34th Chess Olympiad (women) in Istanbul (+3, =5, -4),
- In 2002, at second board in the 35th Chess Olympiad (women) in Bled (+3, =6, -1).

Krupková played for Czech Republic in the European Team Chess Championship:

- In 1999, at first board in the 3rd European Team Chess Championship (women) in Batumi (+2, =3, -1).

== Personal life ==
She was married to Armenian chess grandmaster Sergei Movsesian.
