= Stalmach =

Stalmach is a Polish surname most often found in Silesia. Notable people with the surname include:

- Andrzej Stalmach (1942–2020), Polish athlete
- Dariusz Stalmach (born 2005), Polish footballer
- Paweł Stalmach (1824–1891), Polish journalist, publicist, editor and publisher of newspapers, social and national activist
- Richard Stalmach (born 2006), Czech chess player
