= Petr Hába =

Czech chess grandmaster (born 1965)

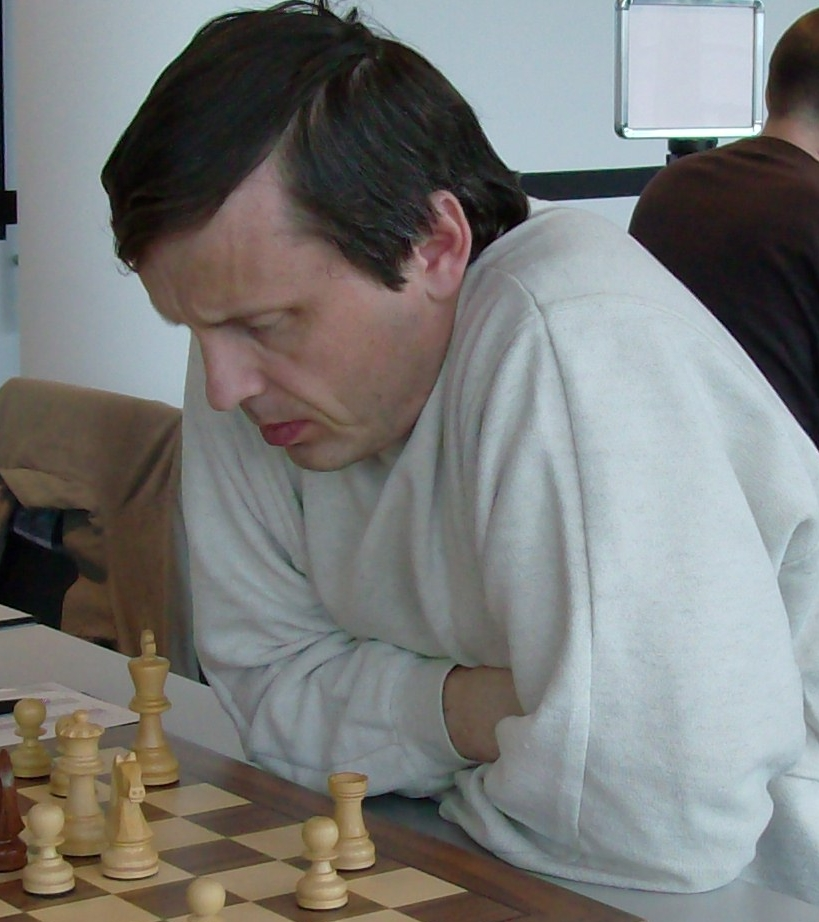
- Hába in 2008

Personal information
- Born: 6 January 1965 (age 61) Gottwaldov, Czechoslovakia

Chess career
- Country: Czechoslovakia (until 1992); Czech Republic (since 1993)
- Title: Grandmaster (1997)
- Peak rating: 2580 (July 1997)

Petr Hába (born 6 January 1965) is a Czech chess Grandmaster (1997).

== Chess career ==
Hába was awarded the Grandmaster title in 1997. Between 1988 and 2004, he represented Czechoslovakia once and the Czech Republic three times at the Chess Olympiad, scoring 17.5 points out of 34 games. He also played twice in the European Team Chess Championship. Hába won the Czech Chess Championship twice: in Turnov in 1996 and in Ostrava in 2002.

Hába won or placed near the top in several tournaments: 1st in Prague (1990), 1st in České Budějovice (1995), 1st in Wattens (1996), 1st in Datteln (2002), tied for 1st–3rd in Chrudim (2003), tied for 1st–3rd in Plzeň (2003), 1st in Chrudim (2004), tied for 1st–5th in Česká Třebová (2006), tied for 1st–5th in Stuttgart (2006), and tied for 1st–6th in Česká Třebová (2007).

In the Czech Chess Extraliga, Hába played for TJ Bohemians Prague from 1993 to 1996 (winning the national team championship in 1994), for ŠK Zlín from 1996 to 2005, and for ŠK Lokomotiva Brno in the 2005–06 season. Since 2006, he has competed for 1. Novoborský ŠK, winning the Extraliga title in 2008, 2010, 2011, 2012, 2013, 2014, 2015, 2016, 2017, and 2018.

In the German Chess Bundesliga, he played for SG Heidelberg-Kirchheim in the 1990–91 and 1992–93 seasons, and for Erfurter SK for six seasons starting in 2001. In the Austrian Chess Bundesliga, he competed for Union Ansfelden in the 2007–08 season and for SG Sparkasse Grieskirchen/Sedda Schallerbach in the 2014–15, 2015–16, and 2017–18 seasons. In January 2015, he was ranked 14th among Czech players.

Hába participated in the European Chess Club Cup in 1990 with Univerzita Brno, in 1994 with TJ Bohemians Prague, and from 2007 to 2011 with 1. Novoborský ŠK, achieving his best team result with a third-place finish in 2011.
