= Marek Vokáč =

Czech chess player (1958–2021)

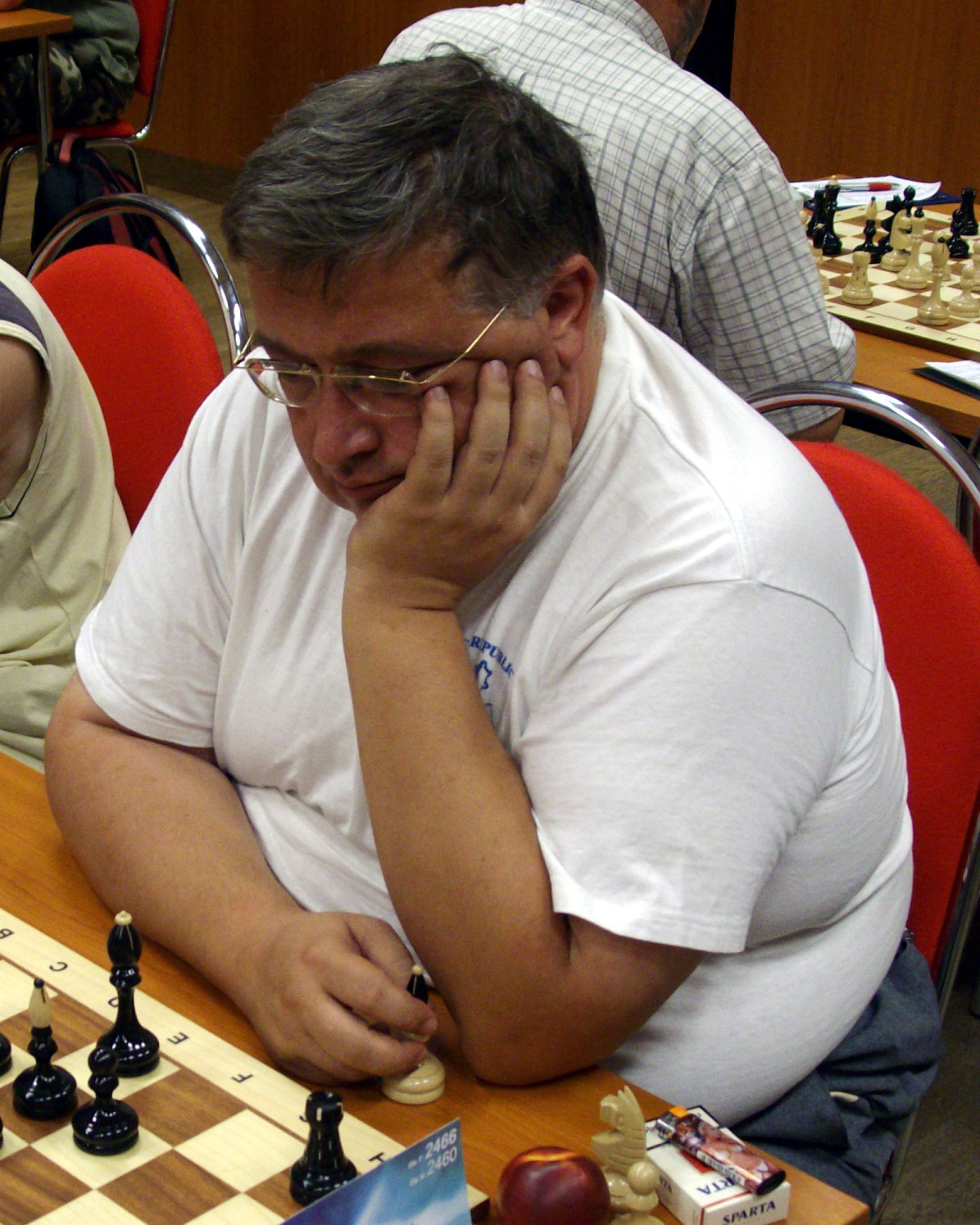
- Vokáč in 2009

Personal information
- Born: 6 December 1958 Prague, Czechoslovakia
- Died: 14 November 2021 (aged 62)

Chess career
- Country: Czech Republic
- Title: Grandmaster (1999)
- Peak rating: 2529 (October 2001)

Marek Vokáč (6 December 1958 – 14 November 2021) was a Czech chess player who received the FIDE title of Grandmaster (GM) in 1999. He was the Czech champion in 1999 and runner-up in 1995.
