= Pavel Šimáček =

Czech chess grandmaster (born 1979)

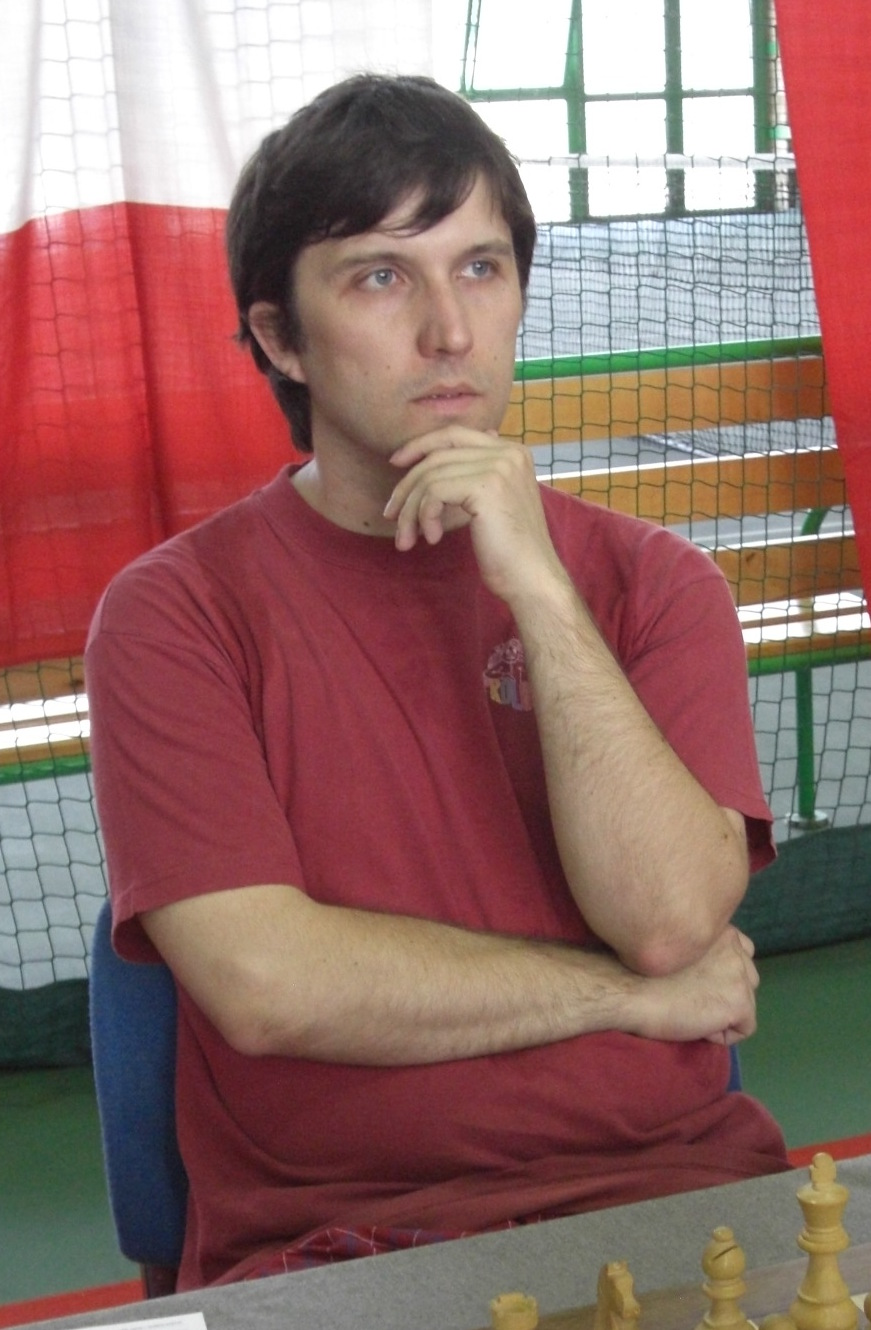
- Šimáček in 2010

Personal information
- Born: 28 April 1979 (age 47) Czechoslovakia

Chess career
- Country: Czech Republic
- Title: Grandmaster (2018)
- Peak rating: 2532 (July 2010)

Pavel Šimáček (born 28 April 1979) is a Czech chess grandmaster. He won the Czech Chess Championship in 2009.

== Chess career ==
Born in 1979, Šimáček earned his international master title in 2002 and his grandmaster title in 2018.

In 1993, he won a silver medal at the Czech Youth Chess Championship in the U14 age group, and in 1998 he repeated this success in the U20 age group. He has repeatedly represented the Czech Republic at the European and World Youth Chess Championships, where he achieved his greatest success in 1995, when he won the European Youth Chess Championship in Verden in the U16 age group.

He won the Czech Chess Championship in 2009. He is the No. 16 ranked Czech player as of May 2018.
