= Kateřina Čedíková =

Czech chess player (born 1981)

Personal information
- Born: 14 December 1981 (age 44) Klatovy, Czech Republic

Chess career
- Country: Czech Republic
- Title: Woman International Master (2004)
- Peak rating: 2271 (January 2005)

Kateřina Čedíková (born 14 December 1981) is a Czech chess player who holds the FIDE title of Woman International Master (WIM, 2004). She is a two-time winner of the Czech Women's Chess Championship (2003, 2009).

== Biography ==
In 1994, Čedíková won the bronze medal in the Czech Youth Chess Championships in U14 age group. In the years 1997–2001 she represented her country several times at the World and European Youth Chess Championships in various age categories.

Čedíková four times won individual medals in Czech Women's Chess Championships: two gold (2003, 2009) and two bronze (2001, 2002). Also she won two bronze medals at the Czech Women's Rapid Chess Championships: in 2001 and 2006.

She played for Czech Republic in the Women's Chess Olympiads:

- In 2004, at third board in the 36th Chess Olympiad (women) in Calvià (+4, =5, -2),
- In 2006, at second board in the 37th Chess Olympiad (women) in Turin (+4, =1, -4).

Čedíková played for Czech Republic in the European Women's Team Chess Championships:

- In 2003, at reserve board in the 5th European Team Chess Championship (women) in Plovdiv (+3, =0, -3),
- In 2005, at second board in the 6th European Team Chess Championship (women) in Gothenburg (+2, =2, -4),
- In 2007, at fourth board in the 7th European Team Chess Championship (women) in Heraklion (+2, =2, -3),
- In 2009, at reserve board in the 8th European Team Chess Championship (women) in Novi Sad (+1, =2, -1).

In 2004, she was awarded the FIDE Woman International Master (WIM) title. Since 2010, she has rarely participated in chess tournaments.
