= František Laudát =

Czech politician (born 1960)

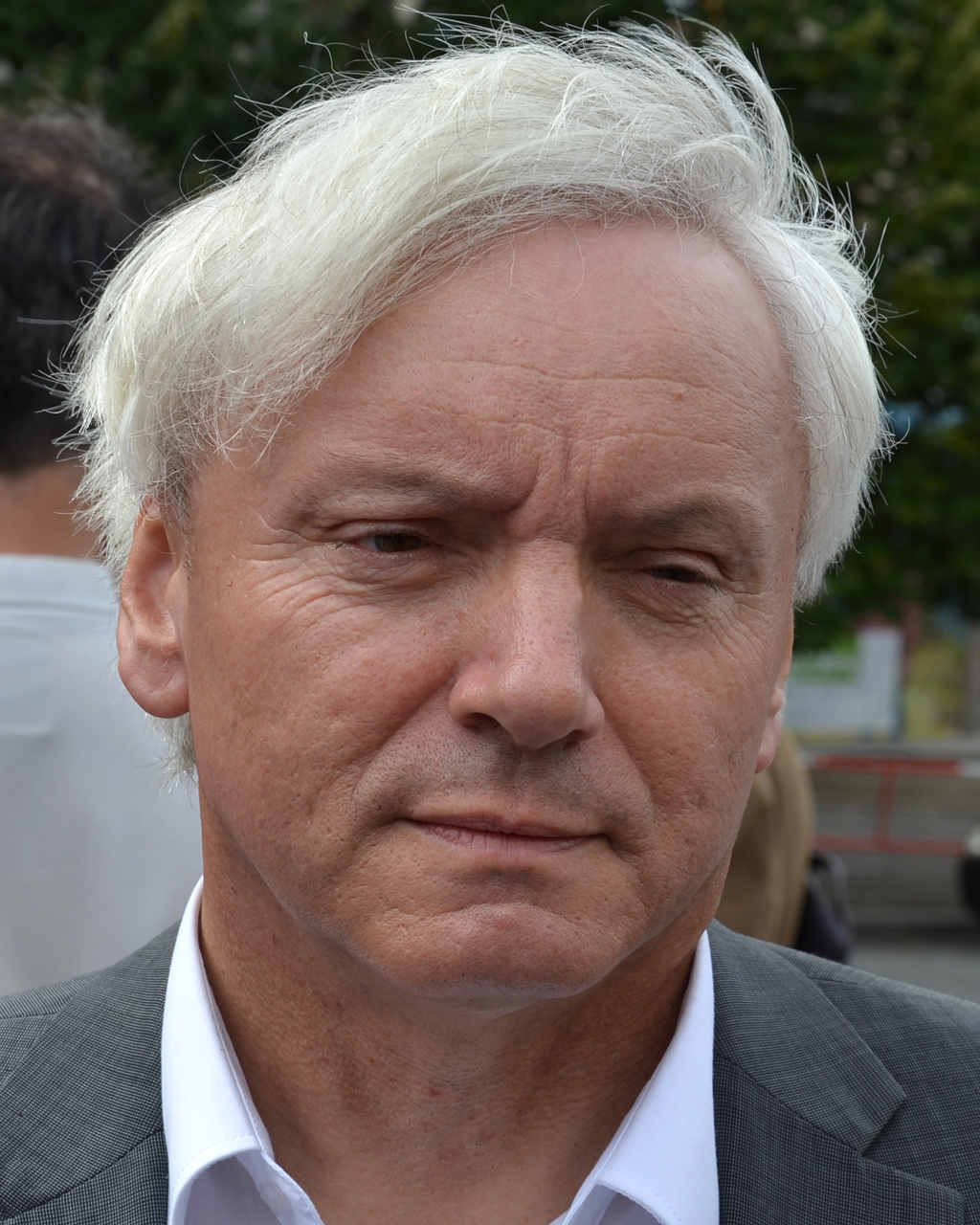

Member of the Chamber of Deputies
- In office 26 October 2013 – 26 October 2017
- In office 3 June 2006 – 28 August 2013

Personal details
- Born: 13 March 1960 (age 66) Ledeč nad Sázavou, Czechoslovakia
- Party: ODS (1991–2009); TOP 09 (2009–2018); KAN (2019–present)
- Education: Czech Technical University

František Laudát (born 13 March 1960) is a Czech politician, who served as a Member of the Chamber of Deputies (MP) from 2013 until 2017. He previously served as an MP from 2006 to 2013. He has been a member of TOP 09 since 2009. From 1991 to 2009, he was a member of the Civic Democratic Party.
