= Jáchym Němec =

Czech chess player (born 2008)

Personal information
- Born: 21 June 2008 (age 18) Prague, Czech Republic

Chess career
- Country: Czech Republic
- Title: International Master (2025)
- FIDE rating: 2483 (September 2026)
- Peak rating: 2483 (September 2026)

Jáchym Němec (born 21 June 2008) is a Czech chess player.

== Chess career ==
In September 2023, he finished in third place in the European Youth Chess Championship.

In March 2026, he tied for 4th place in the Prague Chess Festival’s Challengers section, but was ranked in 6th after tiebreak scores. He was in joint second place with two rounds remaining. He scored wins against Surya Shekhar Ganguly, Štěpán Hrbek, and Zhu Jiner and held draws against Divya Deshmukh and Jonas Buhl Bjerre.
