= Ediz Gürel =

Turkish chess grandmaster (born 2008)

- Gürel at the 46th Chess Olympiad

Personal information
- Born: 5 December 2008 (age 17) Bursa, Turkey

Chess career
- Country: Turkey
- Title: Grandmaster (2024)
- FIDE rating: 2642 (October 2026)
- Peak rating: 2652 (July 2025)
- Ranking: No. 75 (October 2026)
- Peak ranking: No. 70 (November 2026)

Ediz Gürel (born 5 December 2008) is a Turkish chess grandmaster.

== Chess career ==
Gürel became the youngest ever Turkish Grandmaster (GM) after his success in the 2024 Prague Chess Festival, although this record has since been superseded by Yağız Kaan Erdoğmuş.

Gürel finished second, on 7.5/9, in the Under-14 section of the 2022 European Youth Championship.

Gürel secured the third Grandmaster (GM) norm in the Challengers tournament at the 2024 Prague Chess Festival, winning the event with 6.5/9 and qualifying for the Masters group for the 2025 edition. Since he had already surpassed the 2500 rating mark in June 2023, this final norm secured him the Grandmaster title.

In July 2024 Gürel became the highest ranked active Turkish chess player.

At 45th Chess Olympiad, he earned an individual bronze medal, scoring 9/11 on board two.

In games against Gukesh Dommaraju at the FIDE Grand Swiss Tournament 2025, Gürel and Abhimanyu Mishra, both 16 years old, became the youngest players to win a classical chess game against an incumbent World Chess Champion.
