= Czech Chess Championship =

Chess competition in the Czech Republic

The Czech National Chess Championship (Czech: Mistrovství České republiky v šachu) is the chess competition held to determine the best chess player from the Czech Republic.

== History ==
First national championships were held every second year, as the championships of Bohemia (within the Austro-Hungarian Empire), between 1905 and 1913, before the founding of independent Czechoslovakia. Afterwards, the independent Czech Republic's championships continued the tradition.

- 1905–13 – championships of Bohemia
- 1940–44 – championships of Bohemia and Moravia
- 1993–present – championships of the Czech Republic

== List of winners ==
=== Championships of Bohemia ===
Year	City	Winner
1905	Prague	Oldřich Duras
1907	Brno	František Treybal
1909	Prague	Oldřich Duras
1911	Plzeň	Oldřich Duras
1913	Mladá Boleslav	Karel Hromádka

=== Championships of Bohemia and Moravia ===
(in the years of World War II)

Year	City	Winner
1940	Rakovník	Jan Foltys
1943	Prague	František Zíta
1944	Brno	Karel Opočenský

=== Championships of the Czech Republic ===
Year	City	Winner	City	Woman Champion
1993	Luhačovice	Vlastimil Babula	Tišnov	Petra Krupková
1994	Ústí nad Labem	Zbyněk Hráček	Nymburk	Lenka Ptáčníková
1995	Olomouc	Karel Mokrý	Olomouc	Silvie Šaljová
1996	Turnov	Petr Hába	Ústí nad Labem	Lenka Ptáčníková
1997	Zlín	Pavel Blatný	Ostrava	Gabriela Hitzgerová
1998	Zlín	Sergei Movsesian	Klatovy	Gabriela Hitzgerová
1999	Lázně Bohdaneč	Marek Vokáč	Klatovy	Silvie Šaljová
2000	Opava	Pavel Blatný		
2001	Kunžak	Eduard Meduna	Třinec	Olga Sikorová
2002	Ostrava	Petr Hába	Frymburk	Olga Sikorová
2003	Luhačovice	Miloš Jirovský	Luhačovice	Kateřina Čedíková
2004	Karlovy Vary	David Navara	Karlovy Vary	Olga Sikorová
2005	Karlovy Vary	David Navara		
2006	Brno	Viktor Láznička		
2007	Prague	Tomáš Polák		
2008	Havlíčkův Brod	Vlastimil Babula	Havlíčkův Brod	Kateřina Němcová
2009	Děčín	Pavel Šimáček	Děčín	Kateřina Čedíková
2010	Ostrava	David Navara	Ostrava	Kateřina Němcová
2011	Pardubice	Jiří Štoček	Pardubice	Karolína Olšarová
2012	Kouty nad Desnou	David Navara	Kouty nad Desnou	Tereza Olšarová
2013	Ledec nad Sazavou	David Navara	Ledec nad Sazavou	Martina Marečková
2014	Ostrava	David Navara	Ostrava	Olga Sikorová
2015	Havlíčkův Brod	David Navara	Havličkův Brod	Tereza Olšarová
2016	Ostrava	Vojtěch Plát	Ostrava	Joanna Worek
2017	Ostrava	David Navara	Ostrava	Kristýna Havlíková
2018	Ostrava	Svatopluk Svoboda	České Budějovice	Olga Sikorová
2019	Ostrava	David Navara	Prague	Karolína Olšarová
2020	Prague	David Navara	Frydek Mistek	Kristýna Petrová
2021	Zlín	Vojtěch Plát		
2022	Ústí nad Labem	David Navara	Jaroměřice nad Rokytnou	Nataša Richterová
2023	Bystřice nad Pernštejnem	David Navara	Bystřice nad Pernštejnem	Julia Movsesian
2024	Ostrava	David Navara	Ostrava	Olga Sikorová
2025	Plzeň	Štěpán Hrbek	Plzeň	Tereza Olšarová
2026	Brno	David Navara	Brno	Joanna Worek

== Multiple winners ==
The Czech Chess Union and Czech chess press count all Czech and Czechoslovak titles together, with the resulting ranking as follows:

- 13 titles: David Navara (2004–2024)
- 7 titles: Luděk Pachman (1946–1966)
- 6 titles: Vlastimil Hort (1969–1977)
- 5 titles: Ľubomír Ftáčnik (1981–1989)
- 3 titles: Oldřich Duras (1905–1911), Miroslav Filip (1950–1954), Vlastimil Jansa (1964–1984), Karel Opočenský (1927–1938), Jan Smejkal (1973–1986)

== Women ==
Year	City	Winner
1993	Tišnov	Petra Krupková
1994	Nymburk	Lenka Ptáčníková
1994	Chrudim	Hana Kubíková
1995	Olomouc	Silvie Šaljová
1996	Ústí nad Labem	Lenka Ptáčníková
1997	Ostrava	Gabriela Hitzgerová
1998	Klatovy	Gabriela Hitzgerová
1999	Klatovy	Silvie Šaljová
2001	Třinec	Olga Sikorová
2002	Frymburk	Olga Sikorová
2003	Luhačovice	Kateřina Čedíková
2004	Karlovy Vary	Olga Sikorová
2008	Havlíčkův Brod	Kateřina Němcová
2009	Děčín	Kateřina Čedíková
2010	Ostrava	Kateřina Němcová
2011	Pardubice	Karolína Olšarová
2012	Kouty nad Desnou	Tereza Olšarová
2013	Ledec nad Sazavou	Martina Marečková
2014	Ostrava	Olga Sikorová
2015	Havličkův Brod	Tereza Olšarová
2016	Ostrava	Joanna Worek
2017	Ostrava	Kristýna Havlíková
2018	České Budějovice	Olga Sikorová
2019	Prague	Karolína Olšarová

== Bibliography ==
- Modr, Břetislav; Veselý, Jiří. 100 let organizovaného šachu v českých zemích. Příbram, 2005. ISBN 80-86595-14-5.

== See also ==
- Czechoslovak Chess Championship
