= David Navara =

Czech chess grandmaster (born 1985)

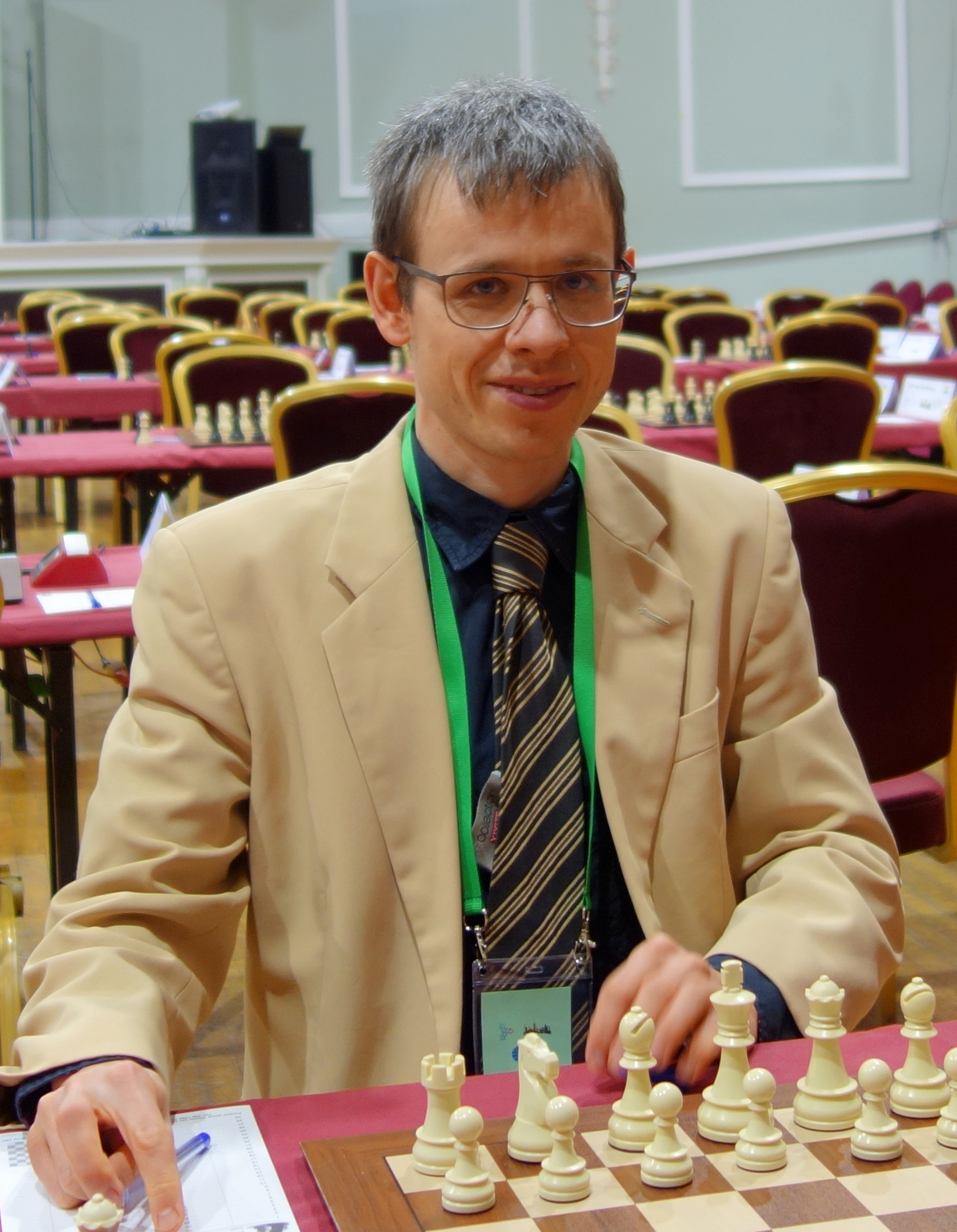
- Navara in 2023

Personal information
- Born: March 27, 1985 (age 41) Prague, Czechoslovakia

Chess career
- Country: Czech Republic
- Title: Grandmaster (2002)
- FIDE rating: 2607 (October 2026)
- Peak rating: 2751 (May 2015)
- Peak ranking: No. 13 (October 2006)

David Navara (born 27 March 1985) is a Czech chess grandmaster. Awarded the title of Grandmaster by FIDE in 2002, he is a 14-time national champion (in 2004, 2005, 2010, 2012, 2013, 2014, 2015, 2017, 2019, 2020, 2022, 2023, 2024 and 2026).

== Early life and grandmaster title ==
Navara's career progressed very quickly under coaches like Miloslav Vanka, IM Josef Přibyl, and GMs Luděk Pachman and Vlastimil Jansa, as he won several world medals in youth categories. In 2001, aged 16, he made his debut on the Czech national team in the European Team Chess Championships, where he scored 7/9 points. He received the title Grandmaster one year later, three days before his 17th birthday. In 2003, he won the open section of the Rubinstein Memorial.

== Adult career ==
Ranked 14th, he finished sixth in the 2004 European Individual Chess Championship in Antalya scoring 7½ points (+5−2=5), including a draw against the eventual champion Vassily Ivanchuk. This result qualified Navara for the 2005 FIDE World Cup, where he was eliminated by Predrag Nikolić in the first round.

In 2006, at the 37th Chess Olympiad he scored 8½ points from 12 games against world-class competition. The next year, Navara was invited for the first time into the supertournament in Wijk aan Zee, where he replaced Alexander Morozevich. Navara, nicknamed Navara Express by organizers, gained 6½ points in 13 games (+3−3=7), including wins against Ruslan Ponomariov and Magnus Carlsen (and draws with black pieces against Vladimir Kramnik, Viswanathan Anand and Veselin Topalov), and finished in 7th place.

In August 2007 Navara finished first in the Ordix Open, a rapid tournament part of the Chess Classic Mainz festival, with a score of 9½/11 on progressive score tiebreak. The following month, he played in the Czech Coal Carlsbad tournament in Karlovy Vary, where he finished third, scoring half a point behind the winners, Ruslan Ponomariov and Sergei Movsesian. Two months later, Navara participated in the FIDE World Cup. He beat Alexander Ivanov of US in the first round and was defeated by Sergei Rublevsky in the second round after tie-breaks.

In 2007–2008 Navara played in the "Torneo di Capodanno" in Reggio Emilia, Italy, scoring 3/8 (+1−3=4). He played in the FIDE Grand Prix tournament in Baku in 2008, scoring 5½/13 (+2−4=7).

At the 2011 Tata Steel Tournament in Wijk aan Zee, Navara competed in the "B" group against other strong GMs like Wesley So, Lê Quang Liêm, Luke McShane, Vladislav Tkachiev, Zahar Efimenko, and others. Navara tied for first place with Luke McShane by finishing with 8½/13. While McShane finished ahead on tie-breaks, both players received invitations to the top "A" group next year. Later in the same year, Navara also took part in the FIDE World Cup; he lost to Alexander Grischuk in the quarterfinals of the competition. The following year Navara won the individual gold medal on board two at the 40th Chess Olympiad in Istanbul playing for the Czech team.

He won the European Blitz Chess Championship in 2014. In April 2018, he participated in the fifth edition of Shamkir Chess, finishing tenth with a score of 2½/9 (+0−4=5).

As of 2022, Navara won 9 national blitz chess championships, most recently the 2019 Czech Blitz Championship with a score of 14/15. Navara became European blitz chess champion for the second time in 2022, finishing with 17½/22 in Katowice. He defended his European blitz title a year later in Zagreb with 11½/13.

=== ČEZ Chess Trophy ===
Since 2003, Navara has played several matches against top players in Prague at the ČEZ Chess Trophy festival.

Year	Opponent	Winner	Result	Notes	Reference
2003	Viktor Korchnoi	Navara	1½–½		
2004	Alexei Shirov	Shirov	½–1½		
2005	Anatoly Karpov		1–1		
2006	Boris Gelfand		2–2		
2007	Nigel Short	Navara	7–3	Ten games of rapid chess of which four games were Chess960.	
2008	Vladimir Kramnik	Kramnik	2½–5½	Rapid chess	
2009	Vasyl Ivanchuk	Ivanchuk	2½–5½	Rapid chess	
2010	Judit Polgar	Polgar	2–6	Rapid chess	
2011	Sergei Movsesian	Navara	3½–2½	Rapid chess	
2012	Peter Svidler	Svidler	1–3		
2013	Hou Yifan	Hou	2–2	The games were drawn but Hou Yifan won the armageddon game played as a tiebreak.	
2014	Hikaru Nakamura	Nakamura	½–3½		
2015	Wesley So	So	1–3		
2016	Richárd Rapport	Rapport	1½–2½		
2017	Vasyl Ivanchuk	Ivanchuk	4½–7½	Rapid chess	
2018	Pentala Harikrishna	Harikrishna	5–7	Rapid chess	
2019	Ding Liren	Ding	3–7	Rapid chess	

=== 2024 controversy and Kramnik lawsuit ===
In May 2024, Navara became a central figure in a major chess controversy initiated by former world chess champion Vladimir Kramnik. Kramnik published a list on social media insinuating cheating in online Titled Tuesday events, on which Navara was prominently featured.

Shortly after, Navara announced that he would file a formal complaint with FIDE regarding Kramnik's behavior. He later clarified that his complaint was not based on a personal grievance alone, and mentioning that the complaint stated, "I am not sure whether he is accusing me", but on broader principles, citing four key objections: Kramnik's own recent fair-play violation, a pattern of unfounded public accusations by Kramnik, flawed statistical analysis, and the tweet's offensive framing.

A year later, in a detailed blog post from May 2025, Navara recounted the full story and the severe psychological impact it had on him for which he had to seek professional help. He wrote that the public insinuation, compounded by FIDE's months-long silence, induced suicidal thoughts, and that there was a "real danger" he could have taken his own life in mid-June 2024, providing context by mentioning he had struggled with mental health issues since childhood. Navara further revealed that after receiving a formal response from FIDE in December 2024, which he found dismissive, he planned to commit suicide in mid-January 2025 but ultimately abandoned the idea.

The dispute escalated further when Kramnik announced his intention to sue Navara for defamation, demanding a public retraction and apology.

== Notable games ==
Below is an excerpt from an article by Lubomir Kavalek in The Washington Post on August 3, 2009:

In the following game, played in the Ordix Open, the Czech grandmaster David Navara defeats former top Armenian grandmaster Rafael Vaganian. Navara decides to test a powerful pawn sacrifice in the Tarrasch variation of the French defense. It was introduced into tournament play more than 60 years ago by the Australian Cecil Purdy, the first correspondence world champion, and it still carries plenty of punch today. Vaganian's problems began after he lost the battle of the only open file and allowed the Czech GM to claim victory with neat tactical play.

Navara vs. Vaganian, Mainz 2009

Position: b8 black rook, f8 black queen, g8 black king, h8 black rook, b7 white pawn, c7 white rook, d7 black bishop, g7 black pawn, e6 black pawn, g6 white bishop, h6 black pawn, a5 black pawn, d5 black pawn, e5 white pawn, g4 white queen, a3 white pawn, f2 white pawn, g2 white pawn, h2 white pawn, c1 white rook, g1 white king

Final position

1. e4 e6 2. d4 d5 3. Nd2 c5 4. Ngf3 Nf6 5. e5 Nfd7 6. c3 Nc6 7. Bd3 Qb6 8. 0-0!? (A promising pawn sacrifice that became fashionable after the game Korchnoi–Udovcic, Leningrad 1967.) 8... cxd4 9. cxd4 Nxd4 10. Nxd4 Qxd4 11. Nf3 Qb6 12. Qc2 (Purdy's choice. 12.Qa4 Qb4 13.Qc2 was also played in the past, but there is no need to improve the position of the black queen.) 12... h6 13. Bd2 (White finished his development and is prepared to seize the c-file with his heavy pieces. Some players prefer 13.Bf4.) 13... Nc5?! (Walking into a dangerous pin. Exchanging the bishops with 13...Bb4, leads to the weakening of the dark squares after 14.Bxb4 Qxb4 15.a3 Qe7 16.Rac1 0-0 17.Qc7! with an unpleasant grip.) 14. Be3! (Threatening to win outright with 15.Rac1. Black must do something about the pin.) 14... Qb4 (Another way to break the pin is 14...Qa5?!, but after 15.b4! Qxb4 16.Rab1 Nxd3!? 17.Rxb4 Nxb4 white's material advantage should tell in the long run. The game Zapolskis–Jorgensen, Dos Hermanas 2004, continued 14...Bd7 15.Rac1 Rc8 16.Qd2 Qd8 17.Bb1 Be7 18.Nd4 a6 19.f4! and after 19...f5 20.exf6 Bxf6 21.Bg6+ Kf8 22.Rxc5 Rxc5 23.Nxe6+ Bxe6 24.Bxc5+ Be7 25.Bxe7+ Qxe7 26.f5 Bf7 27.Rc1 Qd7 28.Qf4 Bxg6 29.fxg6+ Ke8 30.Qe3+ Qe7 31.Rc8+ black resigned.) 15. Be2 Bd7 16. Rfc1 Rc8 17. Nd4 Qa5 (After 17...Na4, the queen sacrifice 18.Qxc8+! leads to a powerful attack after 18...Bxc8 19.Rxc8+ Kd7 20.Rac1 Nc5 21.Ra8! with fairy-tale variations such as 21...Qxb2 22.Nb3! Qxe2 23.Bxc5 Qxa2 24.Bb6! Bd6 25.Rxa7 with white's advantage or 21...a6 22.b3! f5 23.a3! Qxa3 24.Bb5+ Ke7 25.Nxf5+ Kf7 26.Be8+ Kg8 27.Ne7+! Bxe7 28.Bg6+ Bf8 29.Rxf8+! Kxf8 30.Bxc5+ and white wins.) 18. a3 Qd8 19. Bb5! (Threatening to win with 20.b4.) 19... Ra8 (Abandoning the c-file leads to problems.) 20. b4 Na6? (A blunder, but after 20...Bxb5 21.Nxb5 a6 22.Nd4 Ne4 23.f3 Ng5 24.Qc7 Rb8 25.Nb3 Be7 26.Ba7 white should win.) 21. Nxe6! fxe6 22. Bxa6 b6 (A sad admission. White mates after 22...bxa6 23.Qg6+ Ke7 24.Bc5 mate.) 23. Qg6+ Ke7 24. Rc3 Qe8 25. Qg4 Kf7 26. Bd3 Kg8 27. Bg6 Qd8 28. Rac1 (Black can hardly move.) 28... a5 29. b5 (Another winning line is 29.Rc7, for example after 29...axb4 white deflects the black queen from the pawn on e6 with 30.Rxd7! Qxd7 31.Rc7! Rxa3 32.g3, since 32...Qxc7 allows 33.Qxe6+ and white mates; or after 29...Bc5 30.Qf3 Be8 31.Bf7+ Kh7 32.Qg4 Rf8 33.Bxh6! white mates soon.) 29... Bc5 30. Bxc5 bxc5 31. Rxc5 Qe7 32. b6 Rb8 33. b7 Qf8 (33...Rxb7 is met by 34.Rc8+!) 34. Rc7 Black resigned.

Other notable games include:

- David Navara vs. Zdenko Kozul, 37th Chess Olympiad 2006, Sicilian, Richter–Rauzer Attack, 7...a6 Defense, 8...Bd7 (B67), 1–0 Both sides are attacking, but Navara is the first to mate.
- David Navara vs. Peter Svidler, 37th Chess Olympiad 2006, Queen's Gambit Declined Slav (D16), 1–0 A typical breakthrough 19.d5! and a nice mating combination ending the game.
- Ivan Cheparinov vs. David Navara, European Team Chess Championship, Ruy Lopez A spectacular and unexpected queen sac 27...Qf2!!
- Alexander Moiseenko vs. David Navara, World Cup 2011, Queen's Indian Defense After a long struggle, Navara offered a draw in a winning position. Earlier in the game, Navara accidentally touched a piece, but Moiseenko did not insist on the "touch-move" rule that would have lost him the game. Moiseenko was subsequently outplayed by the Czech GM, who with a forced mate on the board offered him a draw.
- David Navara vs. Radoslaw Wojtaszek, Biel 2015, Sicilian, Najdorf Variation, English Attack An extraordinary home preparation by Navara that resulted in his white king heading to the h8-square during the middlegame, as the righteous leader of the commanding white forces.

== Personal life ==
Navara is a Christian and a member of the Evangelical Church of Czech Brethren.
