= Lenka Ptáčníková =

Czech-Icelandic chess player (born 1976)

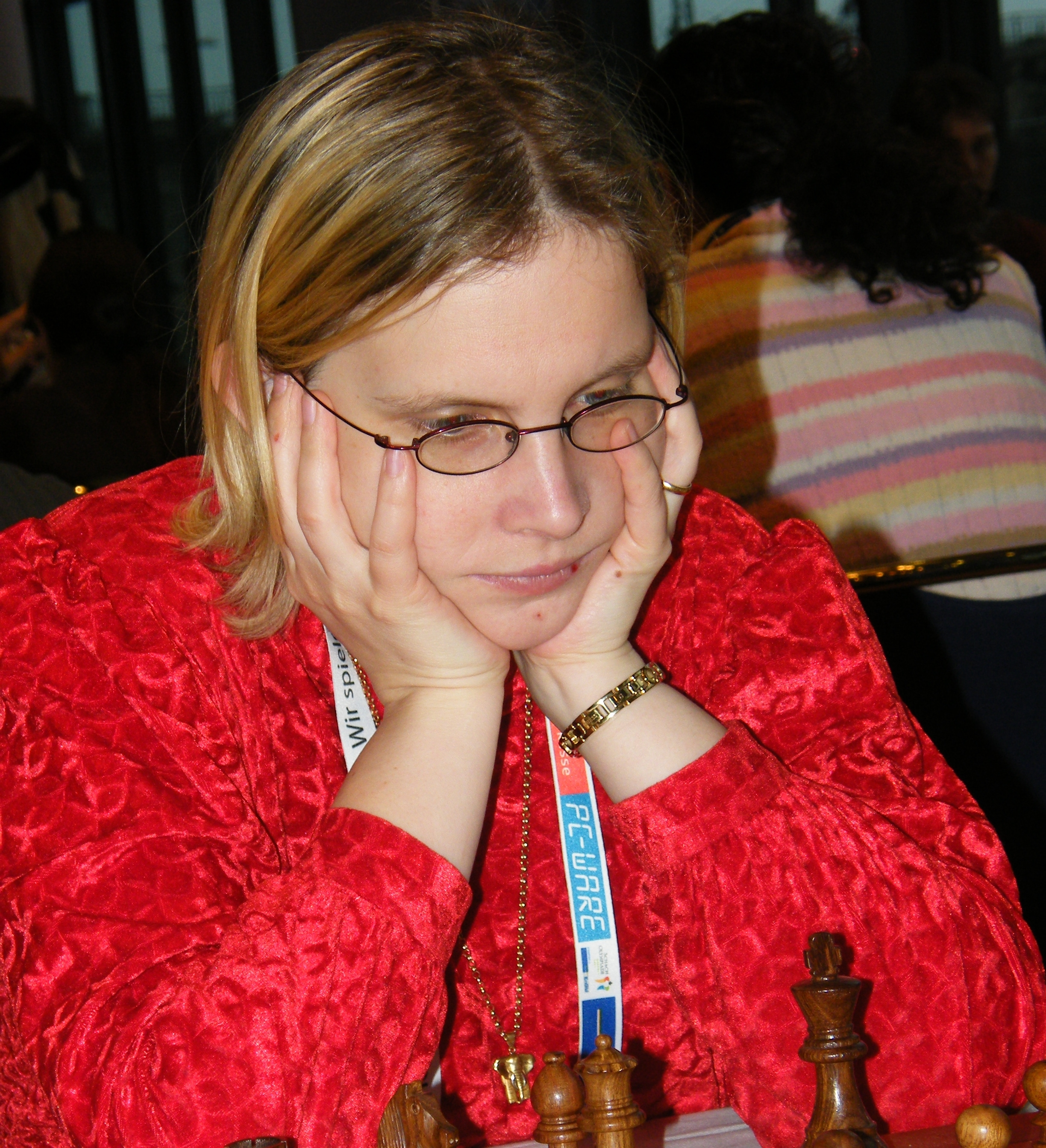

Personal information
- Born: 16 January 1976 (age 50) Czechoslovakia
- Spouse: Helgi Grétarsson (divorced)

Chess career
- Country: Czech Republic (until 2004); Iceland (since 2004)
- Title: Woman Grandmaster (2001)
- Peak rating: 2317 (March 2010)

Lenka Ptáčníková (born 16 January 1976) is a Czech-Icelandic chess player who holds the title of Woman Grandmaster. She won twice the Czech women's chess championship, in 1994 and 1996, and sixteen times, to date, the Icelandic women's chess championship over a span of 19 years.

She transferred to the Icelandic Chess Federation in 2004.

She won the women's Nordic Chess Championship in 2005 and 2017.

She played for Czech Republic at the Women's Chess Olympiads of 1994, 1996, 1998, 2000, 2002 and at the Mitropa Cup in 1997. Ptáčníková has represented Iceland at the Women's Chess Olympiad in 2004, 2006, 2008, 2010, 2012, 2014 and the Women's European Team Chess Championship in 2005 and 2013.
