= Štěpán Hrbek =

Czech chess player (born 2006)

Personal information
- Born: 24 January 2006 (age 20)

Chess career
- Country: Czech Republic
- Title: International Master (2023)
- FIDE rating: 2458 (October 2026)
- Peak rating: 2473 (November 2026)

Štěpán Hrbek (born 24 January 2006) is a Czech chess player.

== Chess career ==
In March 2024, he played in the Challengers section of the Prague Chess Festival, where he managed to win against grandmaster Maxim Rodshtein and held draws against grandmasters Jaime Santos Latasa and Anton Korobov.

In August 2025, he won the Czech Chess Championship with a score of 5.5/9, defeating Jáchym Němec in the final round.

In February 2026, he tied for third place with Sohum Lohia in the Qualifiers section of the Tata Steel Chess Tournament with a score of 5.5/10.

In March 2026, he played in the Challengers section of the Prague Chess Festival, where he managed to win against grandmasters Daniil Yuffa and Zhu Jiner and held draws against grandmasters Jonas Buhl Bjerre, Thomas Beerdsen and Surya Shekhar Ganguly.
