= Ledeč nad Sázavou =

- Town
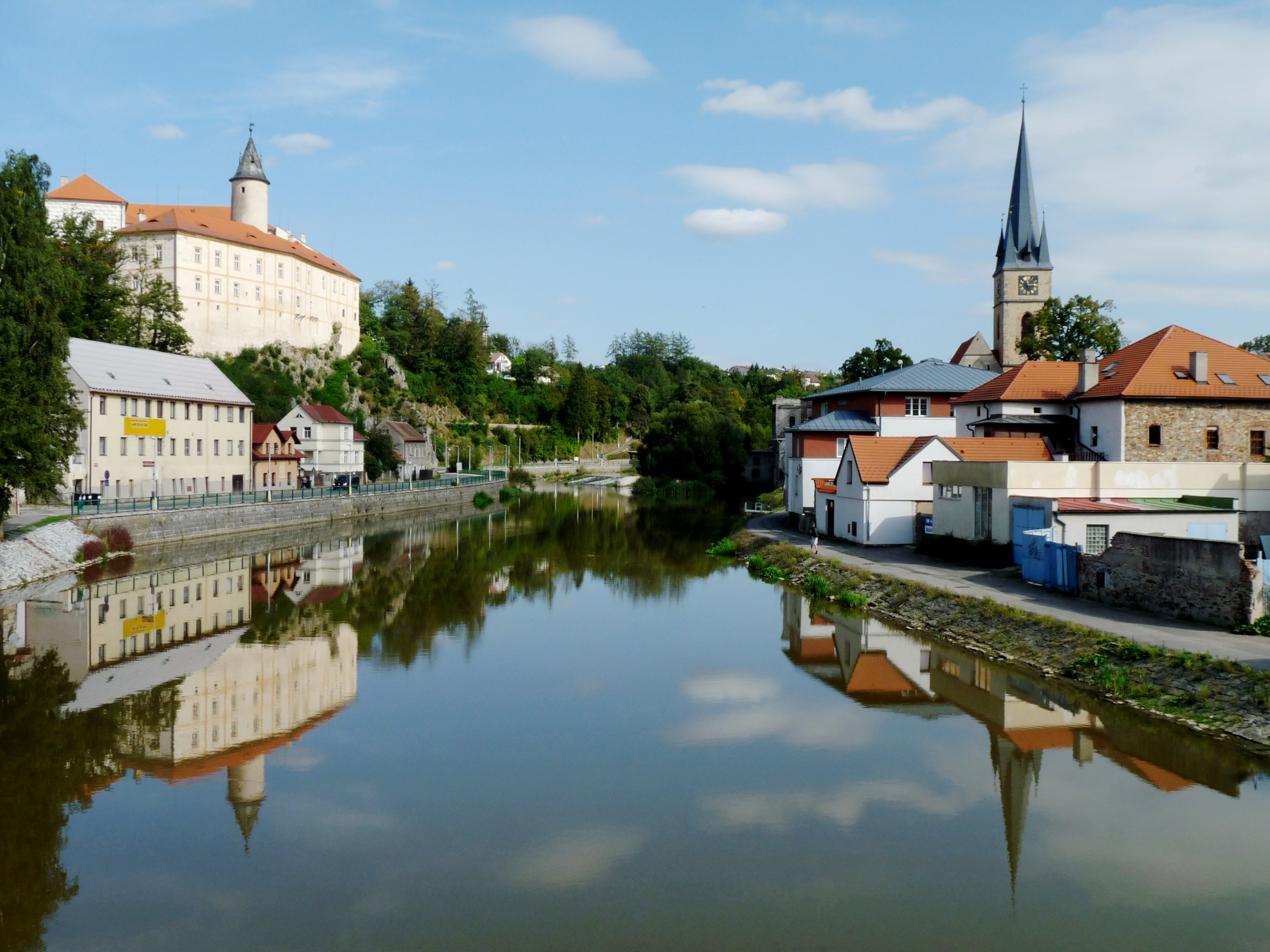
- View towards Ledeč nad Sázavou Castle

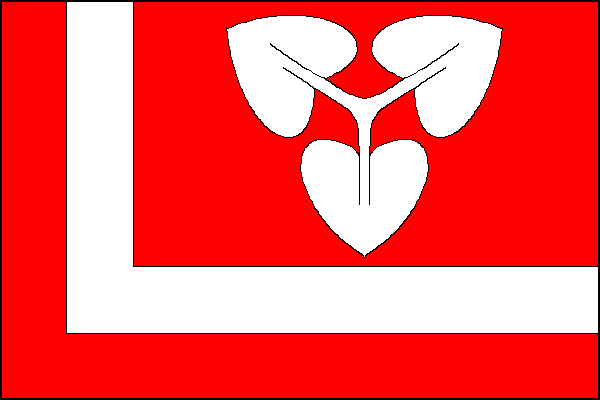
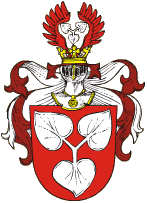
- Flag Coat of arms

- Location in the Czech Republic
- Coordinates: 49°41′43″N 15°16′40″E
- Country: Czech Republic
- Region: Vysočina
- District: Havlíčkův Brod
- First mentioned: 1181

Government
  - Mayor: Jarmila Frantlová

Area
  - Total: 17.01 km^{2} (6.57 sq mi)
- Elevation: 353 m (1,158 ft)

Population (2026-01-01)
  - Total: 4,756
  - Density: 279.6/km^{2} (724.2/sq mi)
- Time zone: UTC+1 (CET)
  - Summer (DST): UTC+2 (CEST)
- Postal code: 584 01
- Website: www.ledecns.cz

Ledeč nad Sázavou (Czech pronunciation: [ˈlɛdɛtʃ ˈnat saːzavou]; until 1921 Ledeč) is a town in Havlíčkův Brod District in the Vysočina Region of the Czech Republic. It has about 4,800 inhabitants. The town proper is located on the Sázava River in the Křemešník Highlands.

Ledeč nad Sázavou became a town in the first half of 16th century. The historic town centre is well preserved and is protected as an urban monument zone. The most important monument is the Ledeč nad Sázavou Castle.

== Administrative division ==
Ledeč nad Sázavou consists of five municipal parts (in brackets population according to the 2021 census):

- Ledeč nad Sázavou (3,985)
- Habrek (201)
- Horní Ledeč (486)
- Obrvaň (91)
- Souboř (45)

== Etymology ==
The name Ledeč is derived from the personal name Ledek, meaning "Ledek's (castle, court)". The suffix nad Sázavou means 'upon Sázava'.

== Geography ==
Ledeč nad Sázavou is located about 23 kilometres (14 mi) northwest of Havlíčkův Brod and 39 km (24 mi) northwest of Jihlava. The southern part of the municipal territory with the town proper lies in the Křemešník Highlands and the northern part extends into the Upper Sázava Hills. The highest point is the hill Ostojovka at 540 m (1,770 ft) above sea level. The Sázava River flows through the town.

== History ==
The first written mention of Ledeč is from 1181, when it was written about a noble from Ledeč. In the first half of 16th century, during the rule of the Ledecký of Říčany noble family, Ledeč was promoted to a town.

In the early 19th century, the railway was built, which helped the economical and cultural development of the area. In 1921, Ledeč was renamed Ledeč nad Sázavou.

== Demographics ==
Historical population

Year	Pop.	±%
1869	2,823	—
1880	3,058	+8.3%
1890	2,892	−5.4%
1900	2,799	−3.2%
1910	3,181	+13.6%

Year	Pop.	±%
1921	3,202	+0.7%
1930	3,079	−3.8%
1950	3,049	−1.0%
1961	3,914	+28.4%
1970	5,057	+29.2%

Year	Pop.	±%
1980	6,082	+20.3%
1991	6,461	+6.2%
2001	6,043	−6.5%
2011	5,303	−12.2%
2021	4,808	−9.3%

Source: Censuses

== Transport ==
Ledeč nad Sázavou is the terminus and starting point of the railway lines from/to Havlíčkův Brod and Čerčany.

== Sights ==
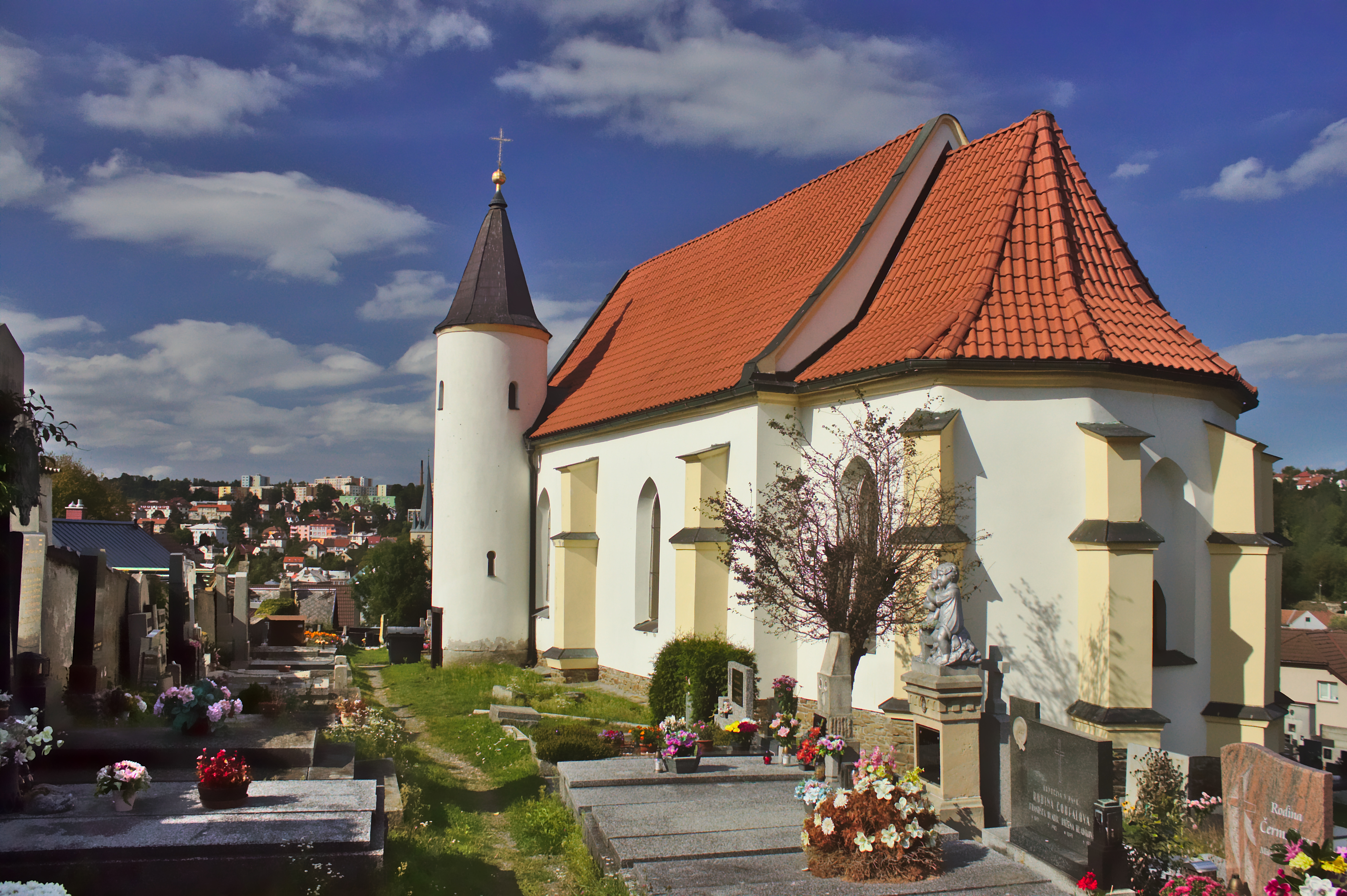
Church of the Holy Trinity

The main landmark is the Ledeč nad Sázavou Castle. The castle was built in the early Gothic style in the first half of the 13th century, and later was rebuilt in the Renaissance and Baroque styles. It has a unique sgraffito decoration of the ceiling of the Renaissance hall. The castle now contains a museum and offers guided tours. The castle also has a 32-metre (105 ft) high tower open to the public.

Among the main landmarks of the town centre is the Church of Saints Peter and Paul. It is a large Gothic building. A unique element is the rib vault, which is not load-bearing and has purely decorative purpose.

The Church of the Holy Trinity is a Renaissance cemetery church. It dates from 1585.

== Notable people ==
- Zdeněk Bárta (1891–1987), fencer
- František Laudát (born 1960), politician
- Jiří Havlíček (born 1976), politician
