= Julia Movsesian =

Czech chess player

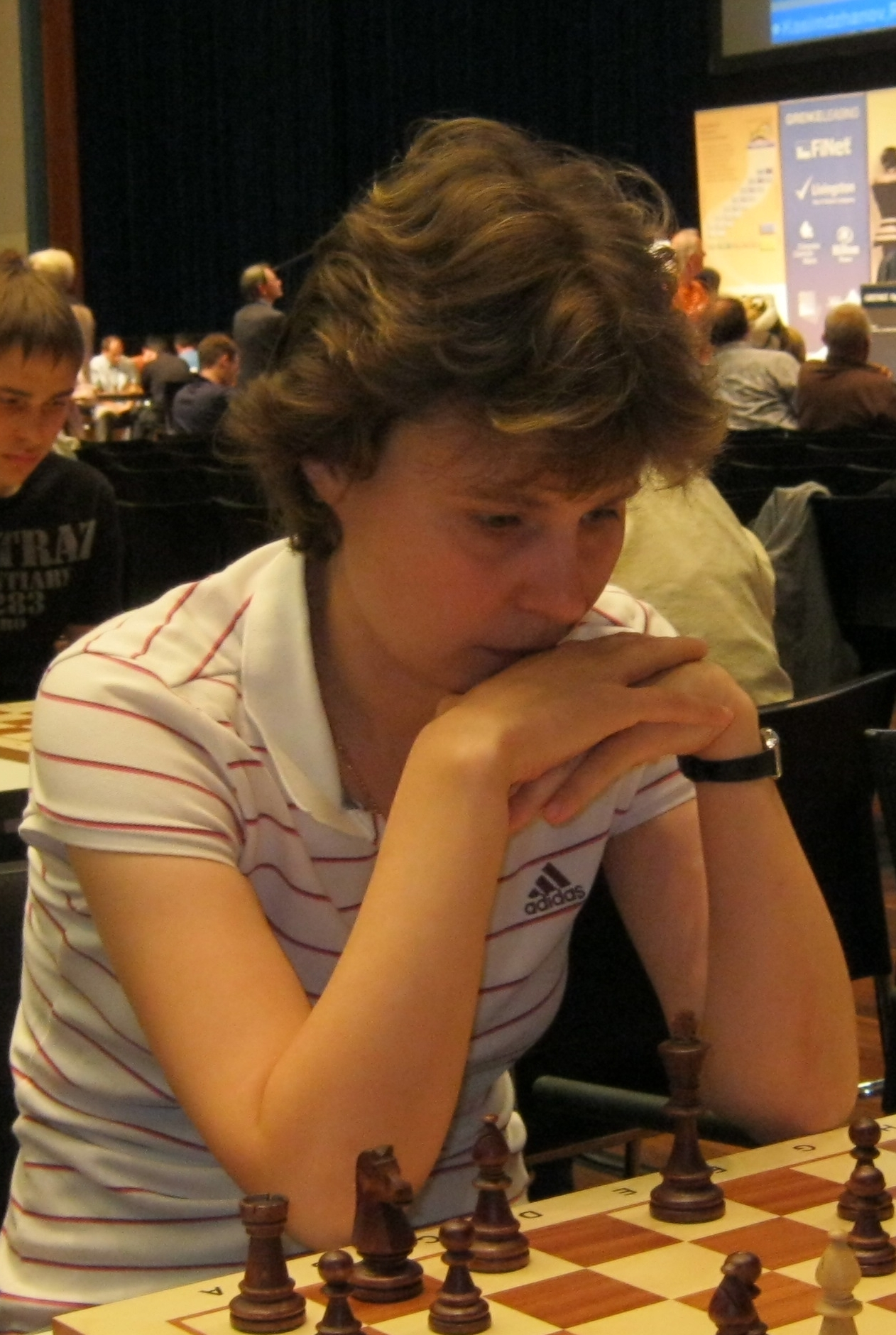
- Movsesian in 2010

Personal information
- Born: 26 November 1981 (age 44) Kopeysk, Russian SFSR, Soviet Union

Chess career
- Country: Russia (until 2010); Slovakia (2010–2021); Czech Republic (since 2021)
- Title: Woman Grandmaster (2006)
- Peak rating: 2369 (July 2006)

Julia Viktorovna Movsesian (née Kochetkova, born 26 November 1981) is a Czech chess player. She had previously played for her native Russia (until 2010) and for Slovakia (2010-2021).

Movsesian was born in Kopeysk. She has been an FIDE Woman Grandmaster (WGM) since 2006.

Movsesian participated in the chess olympiads of 2010, 2012, 2014, 2020, 2022 and 2024. She won the 2023 and 2024 Czech Championship.

In 2013 she married Armenian chess player Sergei Movsesian, who had also represented Slovakia in the past. They have a son together.
