= Jiří Štoček =

Czech chess grandmaster (born 1977)

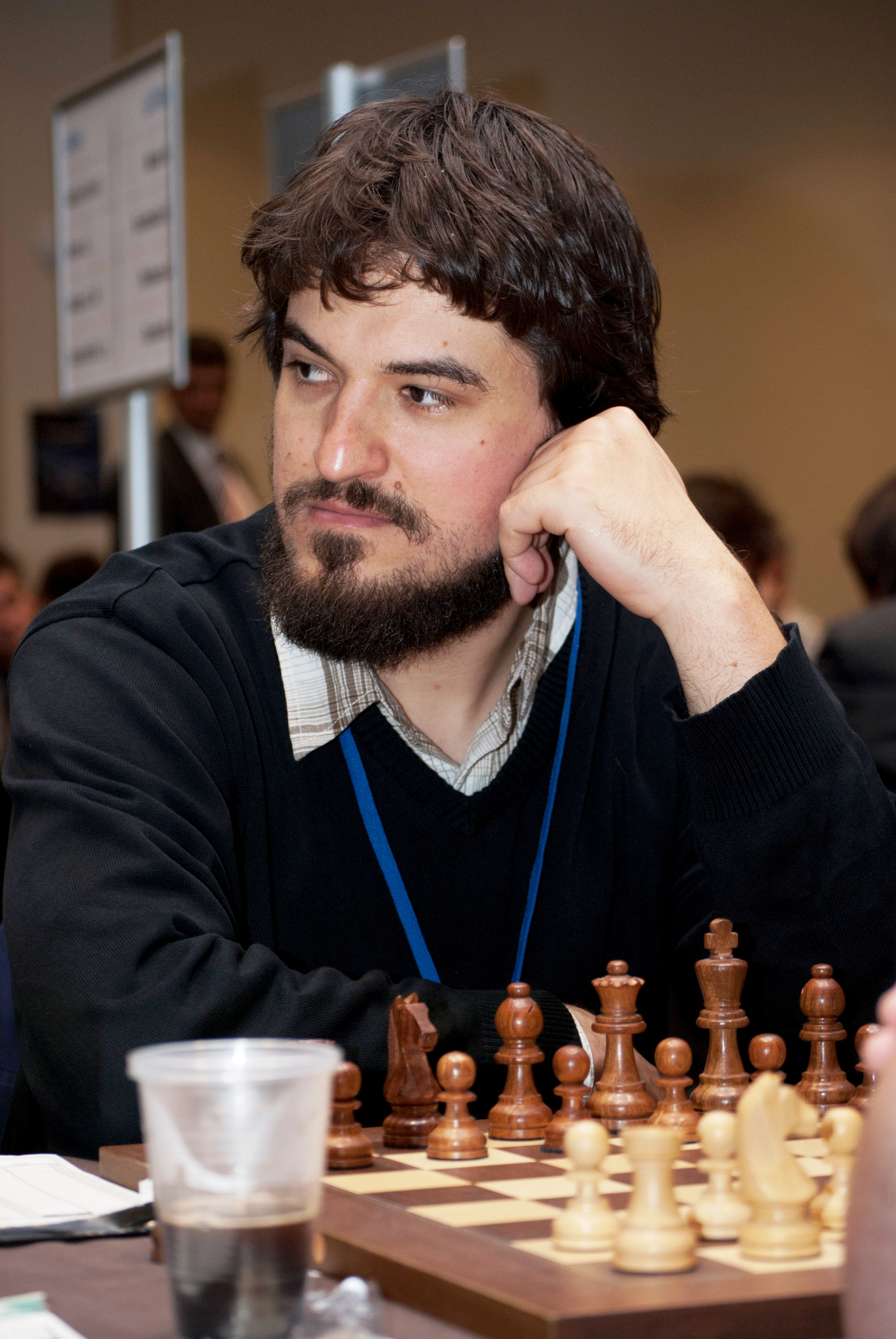
- Štoček in 2011

Personal information
- Born: 10 May 1977 (age 49) Ostrov, Czechoslovakia
- Spouse: Zuzana Hagarová

Chess career
- Country: Czech Republic
- Title: Grandmaster (1998)
- FIDE rating: 2484 (July 2026)
- Peak rating: 2606 (January 2012)

Jiří Štoček (born 10 May 1977) is a Czech chess grandmaster. He won the Czech Chess Championship in 2011.

== Chess career ==
Born in 1977, Štoček earned his international master (IM) title in 1994 and his grandmaster (GM) title in 1998. He won the Czech Chess Championship in 2011 with a score of 6/9 (+3–0=6), half a point ahead of runner-up Jan Krejčí.

== Personal life ==
Štoček is married to IM Zuzana Štočková.
