= Zuzana Hagarová =

Slovak chess player (born 1977)

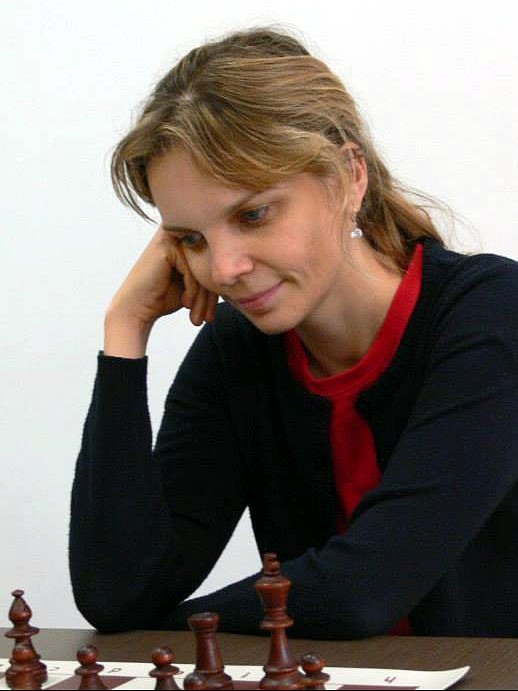
- Zuzana Hagarová in 2013

Personal information
- Born: November 25, 1977 (age 48)
- Spouse: Jiří Štoček

Chess career
- Country: Slovakia
- Title: International Master (2002); Woman Grandmaster (1998)
- Peak rating: 2430 (October 2008)

Zuzana Hagarová, also married Štočková, is a Slovak chess player who holds the title of the FIDE titles of International Master (IM) and Woman Grandmaster (WGM).

== Chess career ==
She is a daughter of chess player Eduard Hagara, both her brothers Eduard Jr. and Martin also play chess.

In 1993 Hagarová won the championship in Slovak Girls' Championship (U16). Many times she participated in the European Youth Chess Championships and World Youth Chess Championships in various age categories. She achieved her greatest success in 1994 when she won the title of vice-champion of the World Girls' Championship (U18) in Szeged.

Štočková has played for Slovakia in nine Chess Olympiads (1994-2008, 2014) and four European Team Chess Championships (1997-2003), where she won team gold in 1999.

She has successfully participated in many international chess tournaments. In 2004, she shared 2nd place in the Tatry Open 2004 with Ján Plachetka and Martin Mrva. In 2008, she shared 2nd place in the Slovakia Open championship in Zvolen. In 2013, she won the Riga Technical University Open's best woman's prize.

Between 2008 and 2018 she was married to Czech chess grandmaster Jiří Štoček.
