= Sergei Movsesian =

Armenian chess grandmaster (born 1978)

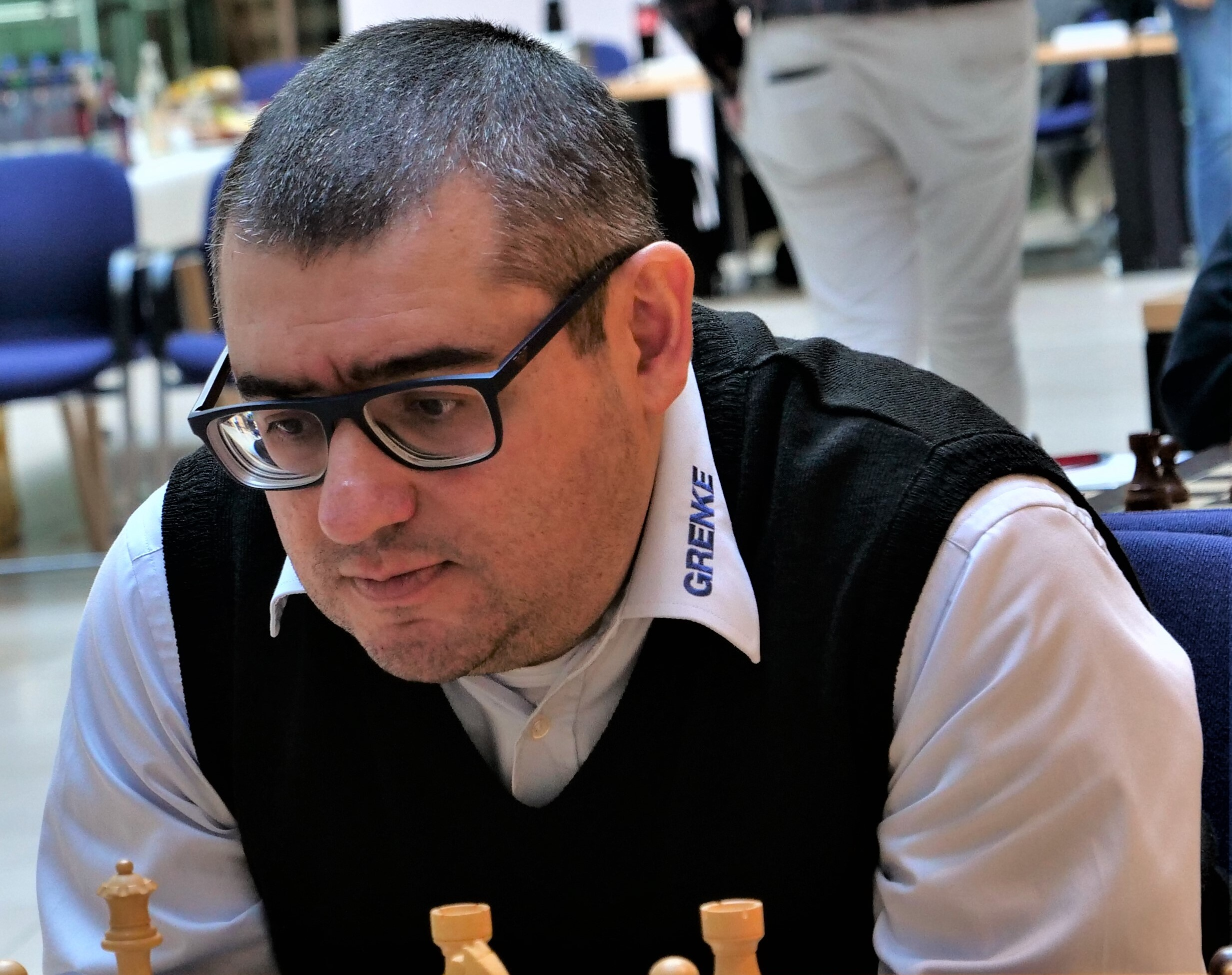
- Movsesian in 2023

Personal information
- Born: 3 November 1978 (age 47) Tbilisi, Georgian SSR, Soviet Union

Chess career
- Country: Georgia (until 1995); Armenia (1996; since 2011); Czech Republic (1997–2002); Slovakia (2002–2010)
- Title: Grandmaster (1997)
- FIDE rating: 2594 (July 2026)
- Peak rating: 2751 (January 2009)
- Peak ranking: No. 10 (January 2009)

Sergei Musheghi Movsesian (Armenian: Սերգեյ Մուշեղի Մովսիսյան; born 3 November 1978) is an Armenian chess player. He was awarded the title Grandmaster by FIDE in 1997. He was a member of the gold medal-winning Armenian team at the 2011 World Team Chess Championship in Ningbo.

Movsesian played for the Czech Republic for most of his career. Later he represented Slovakia, which offered him citizenship. On December 30, 2010 Movsesian started to represent his ancestral country of Armenia.

== Career ==
In 1998 Movsesian won the Czech Chess Championship. In 1999, he reached the quarterfinals of the FIDE World Chess Championship, held in Las Vegas, and lost to Vladimir Akopian by a score of 1½–2½. Movsesian competed in the FIDE World Championship also in 2000, 2002 and 2004.

In 2002 and 2007 he won the Slovak Chess Championship. In 2002 Movsesian also became the European blitz chess champion in Panormo, Crete.

He won international tournaments in Sarajevo, Bosna (2002 and 2007, both outright), at that time a strong closed GM tournament; 2007 Czech Coal Carlsbad Jubilee tournament in Karlovy Vary (joint with Ruslan Ponomariov); Mikhail Chigorin Memorial in Saint Petersburg in 2007; and the Wijk aan Zee Corus B tournament in 2008, a full point ahead of Nigel Short and Etienne Bacrot. At the 2008 European Individual Chess Championship, held in Plovdiv, Movsesian finished in a tie for 2nd–10th places. He won the playoffs to take the silver medal. In the 2013 edition of the same event he tied for 1st–8th with Alexander Moiseenko, Evgeny Romanov, Alexander Beliavsky, Constantin Lupulescu, Francisco Vallejo Pons, Hrant Melkumyan, Ian Nepomniachtchi, Alexey Dreev and Evgeny Alekseev. Movsesian was part of the Armenian team that took the bronze medal in the 2015 World Team Championship in Tsaghkadzor.

== Personal life ==
Born in Tbilisi, Georgia, Movsesian has been living in the Czech Republic since 1994. He is now married to WGM Julia Movsesian. He can speak eight languages.

== Books ==
- Movsesian, Sergei; Klima, Lukas (2009). Czech Open: Pardubice Phenomenon. Caissa Hungary. ISBN 978-80-86725-08-6.
