= Jan Krejčí (chess player) =

Czech chess grandmaster (born 1992)

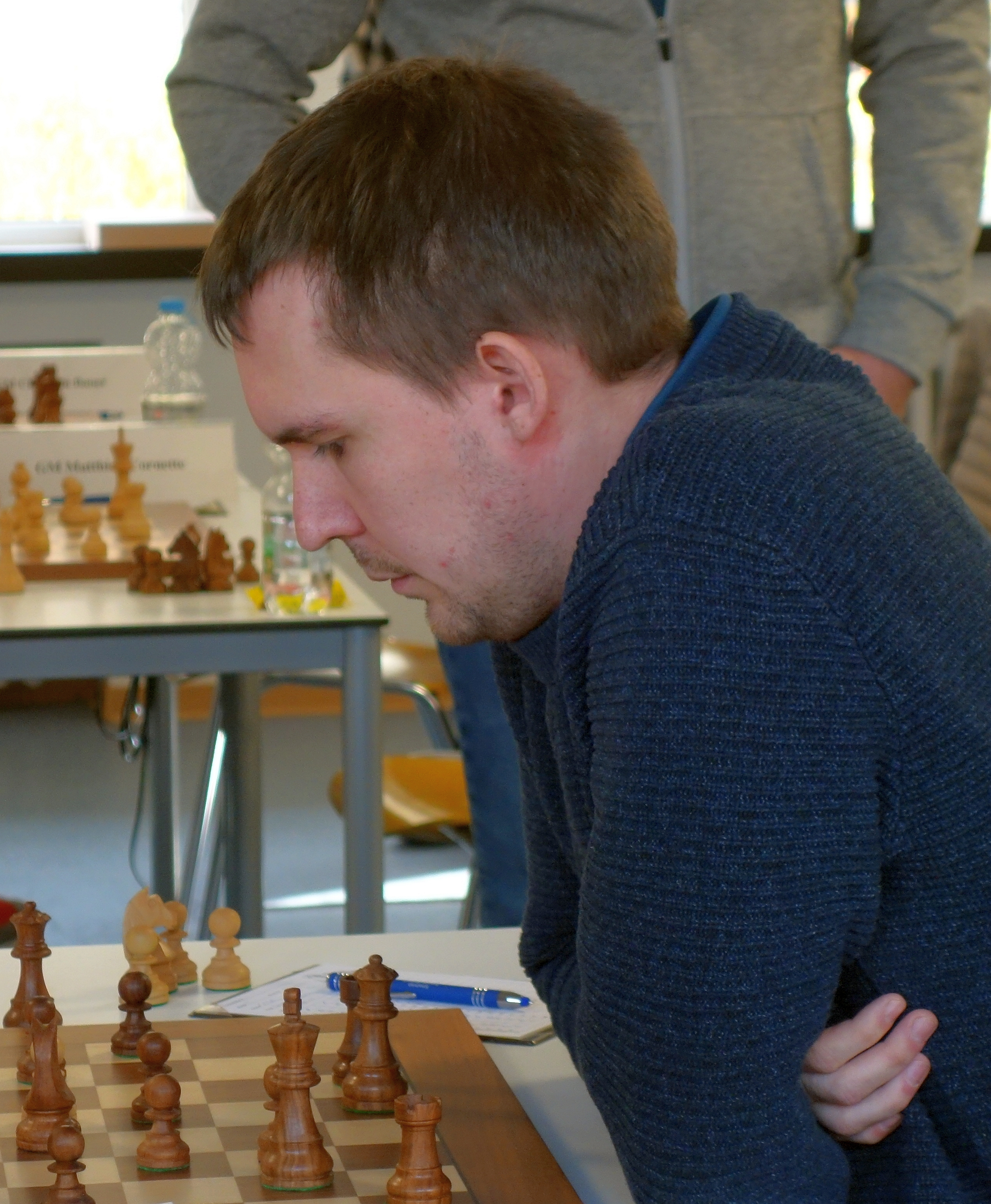
- Krejčí in 2023

Personal information
- Born: 27 September 1992 (age 33)

Chess career
- Country: Czech Republic
- Title: Grandmaster (2011)
- FIDE rating: 2503 (July 2026)
- Peak rating: 2588 (April 2019)

Jan Krejčí (born 27 September 1992) is a Czech chess grandmaster.

== Chess career ==
Born in 1992, Krejčí earned his international master title in 2009 and his grandmaster title in 2011. He won the Pardubice Open in 2017. He is the No. 5 ranked Czech player as of September 2018.
