= Paulius Pultinevičius =

Lithuanian chess grandmaster (born 2001)

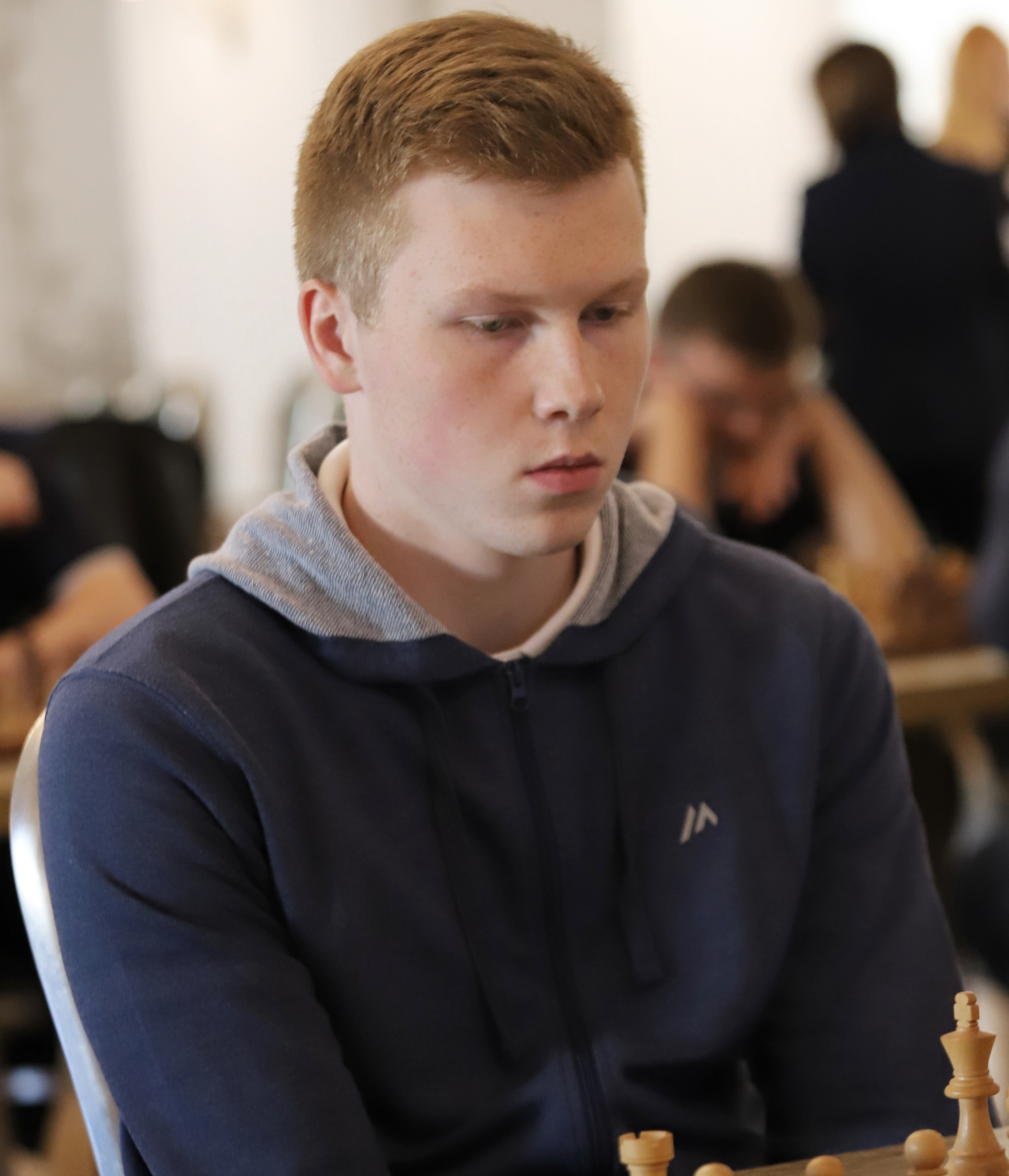
- Pultinevičius in 2021

Personal information
- Born: November 24, 2001 (age 24) Marijampolė, Lithuania

Chess career
- Country: Lithuania
- Title: Grandmaster (2019)
- FIDE rating: 2565 (July 2026)
- Peak rating: 2600 (October 2022)

Paulius Pultinevičius (born 2001) is a Lithuanian chess player. He was awarded the title of Grandmaster by FIDE in 2019. He is ranked the 4th best player in Lithuania.

== Career ==
Pultinevičius was the Lithuanian U-14 Junior Champion, and, aged fifteen, went on to represent Lithuania in 2016 in the 42nd Chess Olympiad on reserve board, going unbeaten over nine games. He again represented Lithuania in the 43rd Chess Olympiad in 2018, this time on board 2.

In 2018, he finished 2nd in the Lithuanian Chess Championship.

Pultinevičius qualified to play in the Chess World Cup 2019, where he was defeated by Alexander Grischuk in the first round.

In 2020, he won the 40th Plunge Open with a score of 8/9.

In August 2022, Pultinevičius won the Riga Technical University Open "A" tournament.

In 2025, in Vilnius he won bronze medal in Lithuanian Chess Championship.
