= 2013 in chess =

This article features a list of events in chess during the year 2013, as well as the FIDE top ten ranked players in September of that year.

== 2013 tournaments ==
This is a list of significant 2013 chess tournaments:

Tournament	Dates	Players	Winner	Runner-up	Third
2013 Tata Steel Chess Tournament	12–27 January	14	(Norway) Magnus Carlsen	(Armenia) Levon Aronian	(India) Viswanathan Anand
2013 Zurich Chess Challenge	23 February – 1 March	4	(Italy) Fabiano Caruana	(India) Viswanathan Anand	(Russia) Vladimir Kramnik
2013 Candidates Tournament	15 March – 1 April	8	(Norway) Magnus Carlsen	(Russia) Vladimir Kramnik	(Russia) Peter Svidler
2013 Zurich Grand Prix	17 April – 1 May	12	(Bulgaria) Veselin Topalov	(United States) Hikaru Nakamura	(Ukraine) Ruslan Ponomariov
2013 Alekhine Memorial	20 April – 1 May	10	(Armenia) Levon Aronian	(Israel) Boris Gelfand	(India) Viswanathan Anand
2013 Norway Chess	7–18 May	10	(Russia) Sergey Karjakin	(Norway) Magnus Carlsen	(United States) Hikaru Nakamura
2013 Thessaloniki Grand Prix	21 May – 4 June	12	(Cuba) Leinier Domínguez	(Italy) Fabiano Caruana	(United States) Gata Kamsky
2013 Tal Memorial	12–23 June	10	(Israel) Boris Gelfand	(Norway) Magnus Carlsen	(Italy) Fabiano Caruana
2013 Beijing Grand Prix	3–17 July	12	(Azerbaijan) Shakhriyar Mamedyarov	(Russia) Alexander Grischuk	(Bulgaria) Veselin Topalov
2013 Dortmund Sparkassen Chess Meeting	26 July – 4 August	10	(England) Michael Adams	(Russia) Vladimir Kramnik	(Germany) Arkadij Naiditsch
2013 Chess World Cup	10 August – 4 September	128	(Russia) Vladimir Kramnik	(Russia) Dmitry Andreikin	(Russia) Evgeny Tomashevsky (France) Maxime Vachier-Lagrave
2013 Sinquefield Cup	9–15 September	4	(Norway) Magnus Carlsen	(United States) Hikaru Nakamura	(Armenia) Levon Aronian
2013 Women's World Chess Championship	10–27 September	2	(China) Hou Yifan	(Ukraine) Anna Ushenina	–
2013 Paris Grand Prix	21 September – 5 October	12	(Italy) Fabiano Caruana	(Israel) Boris Gelfand	(United States) Hikaru Nakamura
2013 Bilbao Chess Masters Final	7–12 October	4	(Armenia) Levon Aronian	(England) Michael Adams	(France) Maxime Vachier-Lagrave
2013 World Chess Championship	6–26 November	2	(Norway) Magnus Carlsen	(India) Viswanathan Anand	–
2013 London Chess Classic	7–15 December	16	(United States) Hikaru Nakamura	(Israel) Boris Gelfand	(England) Michael Adams (Russia) Vladimir Kramnik

== Key dates ==
- 1 April – Magnus Carlsen wins the right to challenge Viswanathan Anand for the 2013 World Chess Championship after winning the Candidates Tournament on tiebreaks.

== FIDE World Rankings ==
The FIDE World Rankings as of September 2013 were:

Rank	Player	Rating
1	(Norway) Magnus Carlsen	2862
2	(Armenia) Levon Aronian	2813
3	(Russia) Vladimir Kramnik	2794
4	(Russia) Alexander Grischuk	2785
5	(Italy) Fabiano Caruana	2779
6	(India) Viswanathan Anand	2775
7	(Azerbaijan) Shakhriyar Mamedyarov	2775
8	(Russia) Sergey Karjakin	2772
9	(United States) Hikaru Nakamura	2772
10	(Bulgaria) Veselin Topalov	2769
11	(Israel) Boris Gelfand	2764
12	(England) Michael Adams	2761
13	(Cuba) Leinier Domínguez	2757
14	(Ukraine) Ruslan Ponomariov	2756
15	(Russia) Peter Svidler	2746
16	(United States) Gata Kamsky	2741
17	(Hungary) Peter Leko	2740
18	(Russia) Alexander Morozevich	2739
19	(Netherlands) Anish Giri	2737
20	(China) Wang Hao	2736
