= Shusha Chess 2022 =

International chess tournament

Shusha Chess 2022 - The international chess tournament “Shusha Chess 2022” dedicated to the 190th anniversary of prominent poet and philanthropist Khurshidbanu Natavan was held in Shusha, Azerbaijan on September 21–25, 2022.

== About tournament ==
The organizers of the Tournament are the Ministry of Youth and Sport of the Azerbaijan Republic and Azerbaijan Chess Federation. The playing venue of the Tournament is “Karabakh” hotel in Shusha, Azerbaijan. The tournament will be held in two categories – men and women. In each category, 10 players will be invited by the Organizing Committee. The winner of each category of “Shusha Chess 2022” is determined by the total points scored in the rapid and blitz tournaments. Shakhriyar Mamedyarov and Arabidze Meri won the tournament in their categories.

== Competitors ==
=== Men ===
- Mamedyarov Shakhriyar
- Maghsoodloo Parham
- Vidit Santosh Gujrathi
- Radjabov Teimour
- Durarbayli Vasif
- Wang Hao
- Mamedov Rauf
- Kasimdzhanov Rustam
- Mustafa Yilmaz
- Guseinov Gadir

=== Women ===
- Arabidze Meri
- Dzagnidze Nana
- Ozturk Orenli Kubra
- Mammadova Gulnar
- Beydullayeva Govhar
- Efroimski Marsel
- Balajayeva Khanim
- Mammadzada Gunay
- Fataliyeva Ulviyya
- Zawadzka Jolanta

== Logo of tournament ==
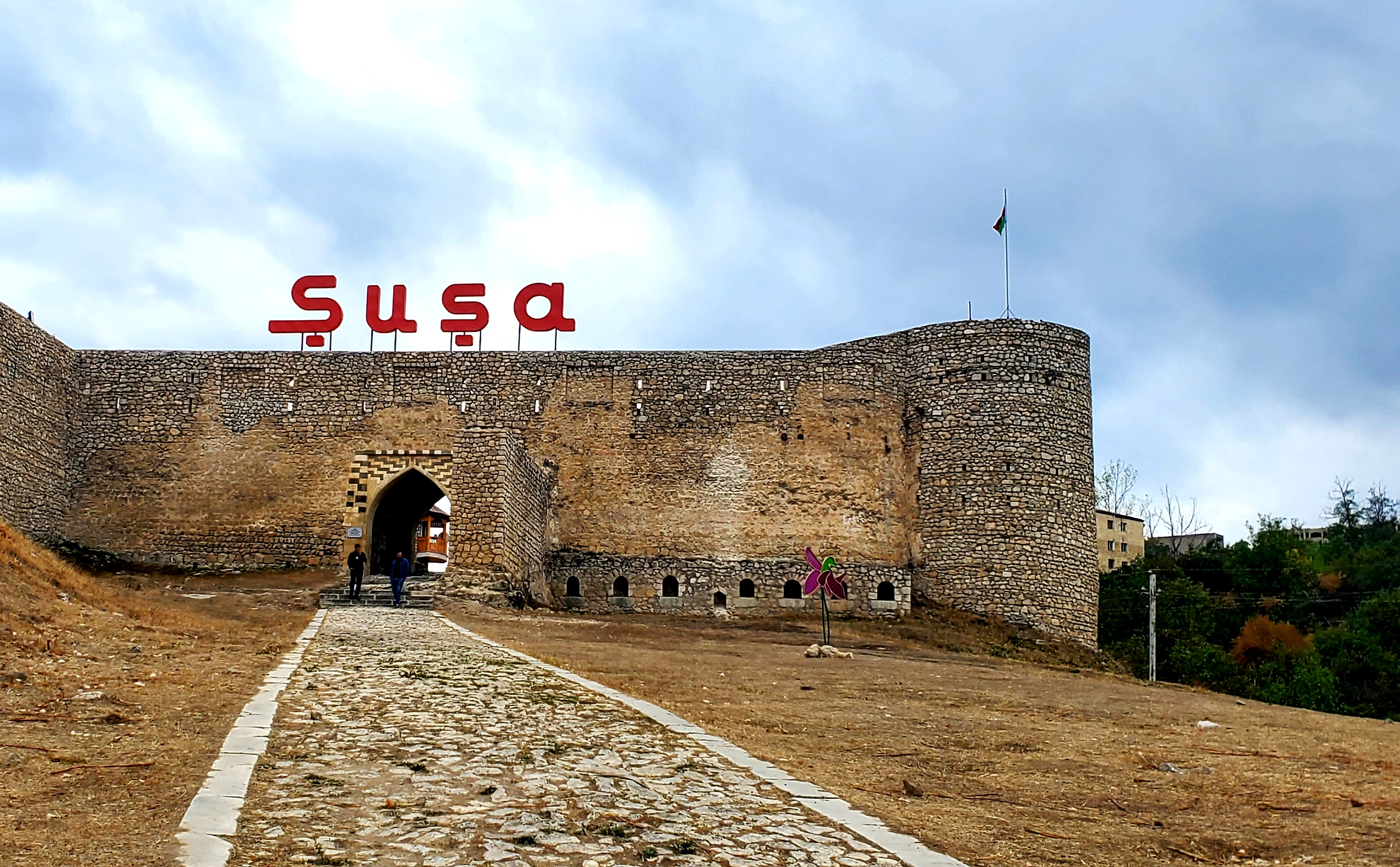
Shusha gate

The logo for the “Shusha Chess 2022” international chess tournament, which will be co-organized by the Azerbaijani Youth and Sports Ministry, the Azerbaijan Chess Federation and the Shusha City State Reserve, has been revealed.

According to the Azerbaijan Chess Federation, the official logo takes inspiration from various historical and cultural elements and depicts a combination of such elements as the Shusha Fortress, the Karabakh horse, and the rook – a major piece in chess.
