= Olga Dolzhykova =

Ukrainian-Norwegian chess player (born 1979)

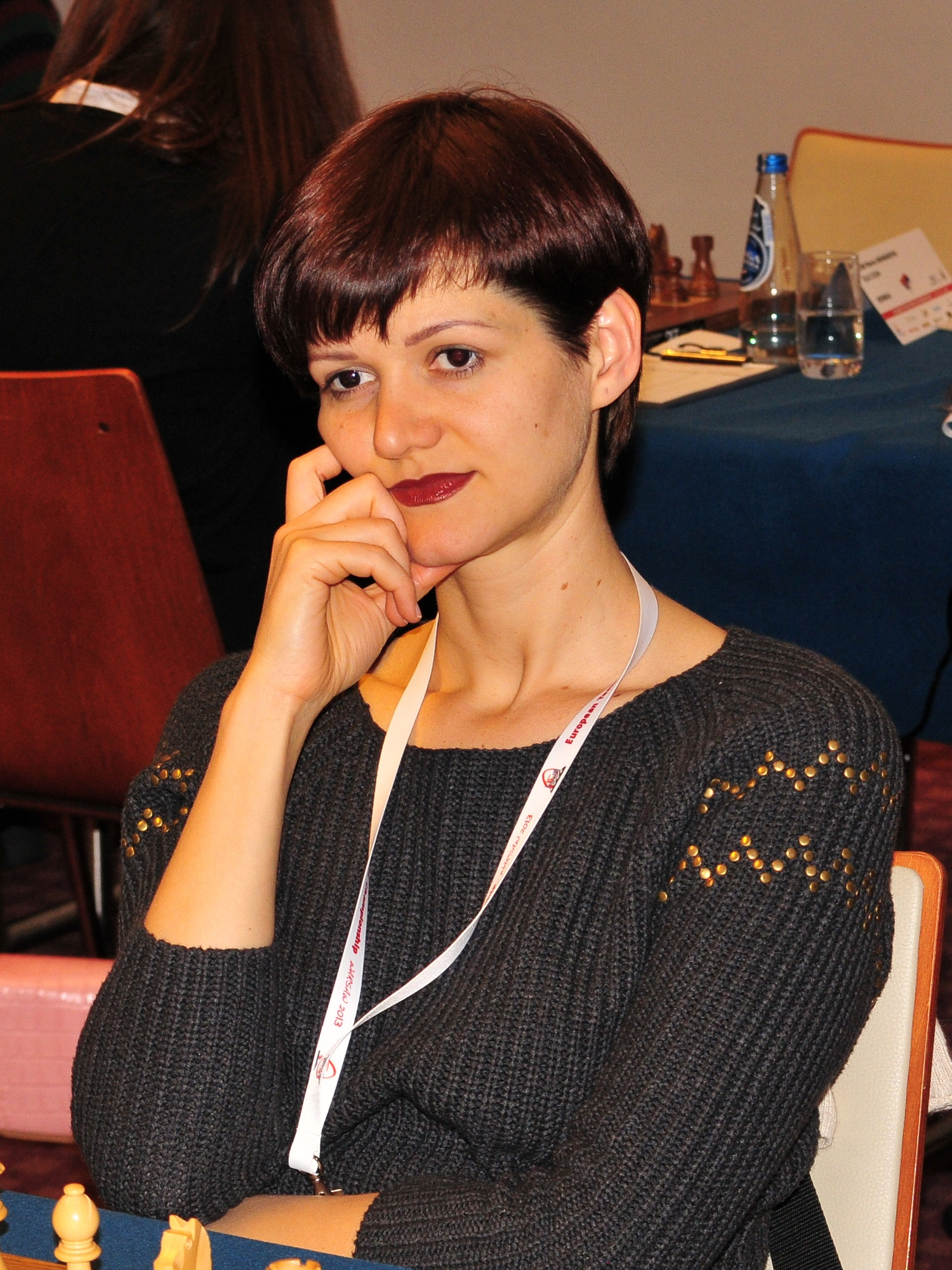

Personal information
- Born: 22 January 1979 (age 47) Ukraine, Soviet Union

Chess career
- Country: Ukraine (until 2012); Norway (since 2012)
- Title: Woman Grandmaster (2002)
- Peak rating: 2342 (January 2001)

Olga Dolzhykova (Olga Dolzhikova; Olga Dolzjikova; born 22 January 1979) is a Ukrainian-Norwegian chess player and educator.

== Career ==
Dolzhykova holds the title of Woman Grandmaster (WGM, 2002). She plays chess for the club Oslo Schakselskap, and has represented Norway internationally at the Chess Olympiad and the European Team Chess Championship.

She was the joint winner of the Ukrainian Independence cup - A in 2008.

She has a doctorate in chess pedagogy and has been assigned with Norges Toppidrettsgymnas, working with chess education for children and young adults.

== Personal life ==
Dolzhikova was born in Ukraine. She is a sister of Kateryna Dolzhykova and thus a former sister-in-law of Sergey Karjakin. She moved to Norway in 2012 as a student, and has settled in Norway with her husband and son.
