= FIDE Grand Prix 2012–13 =

Chess tournament series

FIDE Grand Prix Series 2012–13
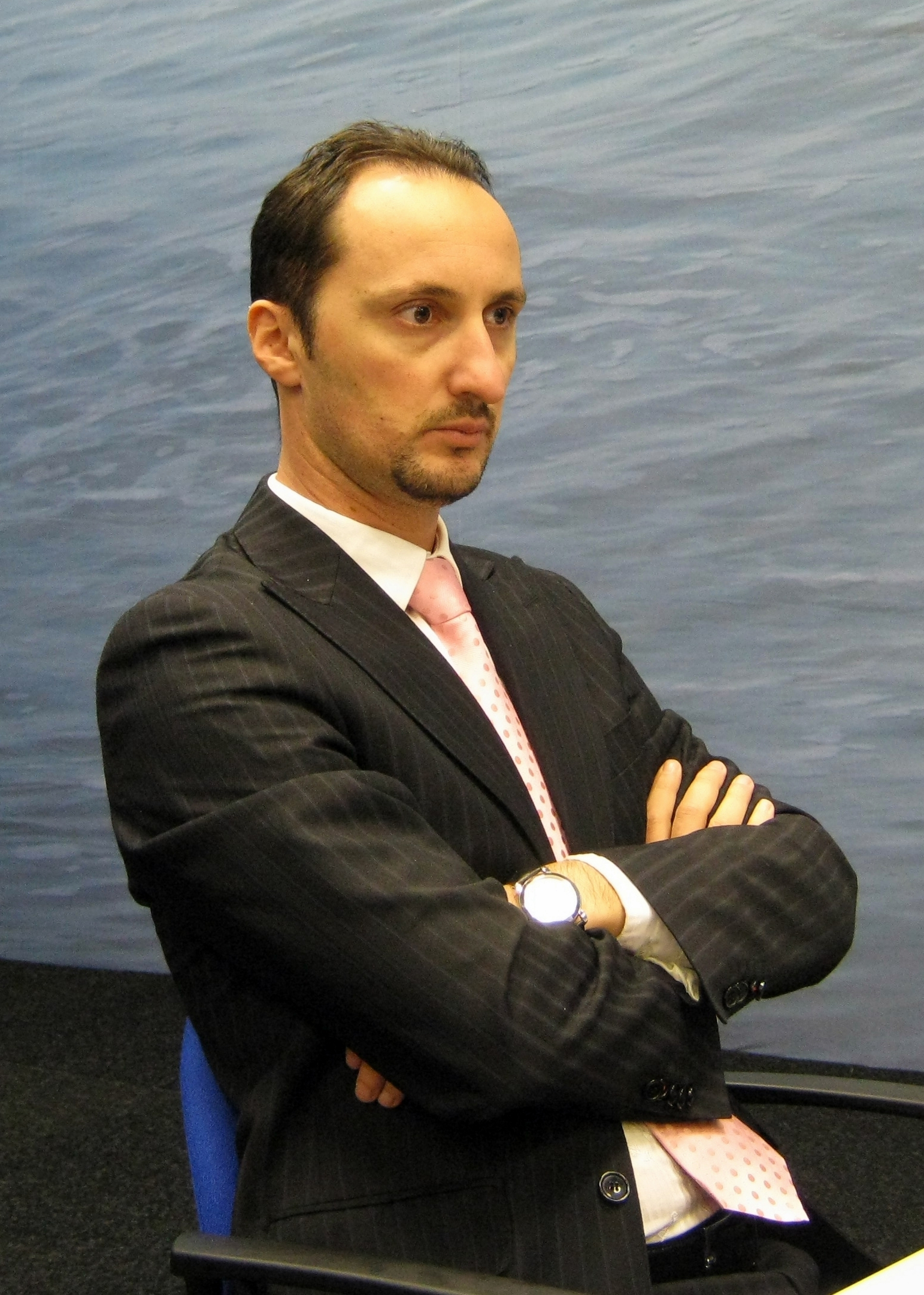
- FIDE Grand Prix 2012–13 winner Veselin Topalov

Tournament information
- Sport: Chess
- Location: (England) London (Uzbekistan) Tashkent (Switzerland) Zug (Greece) Thessaloniki (China) Beijing (France) Paris
- Dates: 21 September 2012– 3 October 2013
- Administrator: FIDE
- Tournament format(s): Series of round-robin tournaments

Final positions
- Champion: (Bulgaria) Veselin Topalov
- Runner-up: (Azerbaijan) Shakhriyar Mamedyarov

The FIDE Grand Prix 2012–13 was a series of six chess tournaments that formed part of the qualification cycle for the World Chess Championship 2014. Veselin Topalov finished first, and Shakhriyar Mamedyarov second in the overall standings. Both therefore qualified for the Candidates Tournament 2014.

== Format ==
Eighteen top players were selected to compete in the Grand Prix. Each player participated in four of the tournaments.

Each tournament was a 12-player, single round-robin tournament. This was a change to the 14 player tournaments last cycle. In each round players scored 1 point for a win, ½ point for a draw and 0 for a loss. Grand Prix points were then allocated according to each player's standing in the tournament: 170 Grand Prix points for first place, 140 for second place, 110 for third place, and then 90 down to 10 points by steps of 10. In case of a tie in points the Grand Prix points were shared evenly by the tied players. Only the three best tournament results of each player were counted. The player with the most Grand Prix points was the winner.

== Players and qualification ==
The three highest ranked players on the FIDE rating list chose not to enter the Grand Prix. They were world No. 1 Magnus Carlsen, 2008–2010 Grand Prix winner Levon Aronian and ex-world champion Vladimir Kramnik. World Champion Viswanathan Anand also declined participation. There were several ways to qualify for the Grand Prix series:

Player	Country	Qualifying method
Boris Gelfand	Israel	World Chess Championship 2012
Peter Svidler^{[1]}^{[5]}	Russia	Chess World Cup 2011
Alexander Grischuk	Russia	Chess World Cup 2011
Vassily Ivanchuk	Ukraine	Chess World Cup 2011
Ruslan Ponomariov	Ukraine	Chess World Cup 2011
Teimour Radjabov^{[3]}^{[4]}^{[5]}	Azerbaijan	FIDE rating list (July 2011 and January 2012 average)
Sergey Karjakin^{[5]}	Russia	FIDE rating list (July 2011 and January 2012 average)
Hikaru Nakamura	United States	FIDE rating list (July 2011 and January 2012 average)
Veselin Topalov	Bulgaria	FIDE rating list (July 2011 and January 2012 average)
Shakhriyar Mamedyarov	Azerbaijan	FIDE rating list (July 2011 and January 2012 average)
Vugar Gashimov^{[2]}	Azerbaijan	FIDE rating list (July 2011 and January 2012 average)
Fabiano Caruana	Italy	FIDE President nominee
Alexander Morozevich	Russia	AGON nominees
Wang Hao	China	AGON nominees
Peter Leko	Hungary	AGON nominees
Leinier Domínguez	Cuba	AGON nominees
Anish Giri	Netherlands	AGON nominees
Rustam Kasimdzhanov	Uzbekistan	AGON nominees
Michael Adams^{[1]}	England	Replacements by rating
Gata Kamsky^{[2]}	United States	Replacements by rating
Étienne Bacrot^{[3]}^{[5]}	France	Replacements by rating
Wang Yue^{[4]}	China	Replacements by rating
Evgeny Tomashevsky^{[5]}	Russia	Replacements by rating
Laurent Fressinet^{[5]}	France	Replacements by rating

== Prize money and Grand Prix points ==
The prize money was €170,000 per single Grand Prix and €420,000 for the overall Grand Prix finishes.

Place	Single Grand Prix event	Overall standings	Grand Prix points
1	€25,000	€100,000	170
2	€22,500	€80,000	140
3	€20,000	€60,000	110
4	€17,500	€50,000	90
5	€15,000	€40,000	80
6	€13,000	€30,000	70
7	€12,000	€25,000	60
8	€11,000	€20,000	50
9	€10,000	€15,000	40
10	€9,000	–	30
11	€8,000	–	20
12	€7,000	–	10

== Tie breaks ==
With the objective of determining qualifiers to play in the Candidates Tournament 2014, and in the case that two or more players had equal cumulative points at the top, the following criteria were utilized to decide the overall Series winner and other overall placings:

1. Ranking points of the fourth result not already taken in the top three ranking results.
2. Number of actual game result points scored in the best three tournaments.
3. Game points of the fourth result not already taken in the top three results.
4. Number of wins.
5. Drawing of lots.

== Schedule ==
The six tournaments were:

No.	Host city	Date	Winners	Points (win/draw/loss)
1	London, England	21 September – 3 October 2012	Veselin Topalov (BUL); Boris Gelfand (ISR); Shakhriyar Mamedyarov (AZE)	7/11 (+3=8–0); 7/11 (+4=6–1); 7/11 (+4=6–1)
2	Tashkent, Uzbekistan	22 November – 4 December 2012	Sergey Karjakin (RUS); Wang Hao (CHN); Alexander Morozevich (RUS)	6½/11 (+3=7–1); 6½/11 (+3=7–1); 6½/11 (+4=5–2)
3	Zug, Switzerland	18–30 April 2013	Veselin Topalov (BUL)	8/11 (+5=6–0)
4	Thessaloniki, Greece	22 May – 3 June 2013	Leinier Domínguez (CUB)	8/11 (+6=4–1)
5	Beijing, China	4–16 July 2013	Shakhriyar Mamedyarov (AZE)	7/11 (+5=4−2)
6	Paris, France	22 September – 4 October 2013	Fabiano Caruana (ITA); Boris Gelfand (ISR)	7/11 (+4=6–1); 7/11 (+4=6–1)

The third stage of the Grand Prix was initially to be held in Lisbon, Portugal.

The fourth stage of the Grand Prix was initially to be held in Madrid, Spain.

The fifth stage of the Grand Prix was initially to be held in Berlin, Germany.

== Events crosstables ==
=== London 2012 ===
1st stage, London, England, 21 September – 3 October 2012
	Player	Rating	1	2	3	4	5	6	7	8	9	10	11	12	Total	SB	TPR	GP
1	Veselin Topalov (BUL)	2752		½	½	½	½	½	½	1	½	1	1	½	7	36.25	2834	140
2	Boris Gelfand (ISR)	2738	½		½	0	½	1	1	½	1	½	½	1	7	35.75	2836	140
3	Shakhriyar Mamedyarov (AZE)	2729	½	½		0	½	½	½	½	1	1	1	1	7	34.75	2836	140
4	Alexander Grischuk (RUS)	2754	½	1	1		½	½	½	½	½	½	½	½	6½	36.75	2801	90
5	Peter Leko (HUN)	2737	½	½	½	½		½	½	1	½	½	½	½	6	32.50	2770	80
6	Wang Hao (CHN)	2742	½	0	½	½	½		½	½	½	½	½	1	5½	28.75	2739	70
7	Michael Adams (ENG)	2722	½	0	½	½	½	½		½	0	½	½	1	5	26.75	2709	55
8	Vassily Ivanchuk (UKR)	2769	0	½	½	½	0	½	½		½	½	½	1	5	26.00	2705	55
9	Rustam Kasimdzhanov (UZB)	2684	½	0	0	½	½	½	1	½		½	½	0	4½	24.25	2680	35
10	Leinier Domínguez (CUB)	2725	0	½	0	½	½	½	½	½	½		½	½	4½	23.75	2677	35
11	Anish Giri (NED)	2730	0	½	0	½	½	½	½	½	½	½		0	4	22.00	2643	15
12	Hikaru Nakamura (USA)	2783	½	0	0	½	½	0	0	0	1	½	1		4	20.50	2638	15

=== Tashkent 2012 ===
2nd stage, Tashkent, Uzbekistan, 22 November – 4 December 2012
	Player	Rating	1	2	3	4	5	6	7	8	9	10	11	12	Total	H2H	Wins	SB	TPR	GP
1	Sergey Karjakin (RUS)	2775		½	1	½	0	½	½	½	1	½	1	½	6½	1½	3	34.75	2808	140
2	Wang Hao (CHN)	2737	½		½	1	1	0	½	½	½	½	½	1	6½	1	3	34.50	2811	140
3	Alexander Morozevich (RUS)	2748	0	½		1	½	½	½	1	0	½	1	1	6½	½	4	33.25	2810	140
4	Fabiano Caruana (ITA)	2786	½	0	0		½	½	½	½	½	1	1	1	6	1	3	29.50	2776	80
5	Shakhriyar Mamedyarov (AZE)	2764	1	0	½	½		½	1	½	½	½	½	½	6	1	2	32.75	2777	80
6	Rustam Kasimdzhanov (UZB)	2696	½	1	½	½	½		½	½	½	½	½	½	6	1	1	33.25	2783	80
7	Peter Svidler (RUS)	2747	½	½	½	½	0	½		½	1	½	½	½	5½	1½	1	30.00	2747	50
8	Peter Leko (HUN)	2732	½	½	0	½	½	½	½		½	½	½	1	5½	1	1	28.75	2748	50
9	Ruslan Ponomariov (UKR)	2741	0	½	1	½	½	½	0	½		½	1	½	5½	½	2	29.50	2747	50
10	Boris Gelfand (ISR)	2751	½	½	½	0	½	½	½	½	½		½	0	4½	—	0	26.00	2683	30
11	Leinier Domínguez (CUB)	2726	0	½	0	0	½	½	½	½	0	½		1	4	—	1	20.50	2652	20
12	Gata Kamsky (USA)	2762	½	0	0	0	½	½	½	0	½	1	0		3½	—	1	19.25	2614	10

=== Zug 2013 ===
3rd stage, Zug, Switzerland, 18–30 April 2013
	Player	Rating	1	2	3	4	5	6	7	8	9	10	11	12	Total	H2H	Wins	SB	TPR	GP
1	Veselin Topalov (BUL)	2771		1	½	1	½	1	1	½	1	½	½	½	8	—	5	43.00	2924	170
2	Hikaru Nakamura (USA)	2767	0		½	½	½	1	½	½	½	½	1	1	6½	—	3	33.00	2818	140
3	Ruslan Ponomariov (UKR)	2733	½	½		1	1	½	½	½	½	0	½	½	6	1	2	33.50	2789	100
4	Fabiano Caruana (ITA)	2772	0	½	0		1	½	½	½	½	1	1	½	6	0	3	30.25	2785	100
5	Gata Kamsky (USA)	2741	½	½	0	0		1	1	½	½	1	0	½	5½	1	3	29.50	2756	75
6	Alexander Morozevich (RUS)	2758	0	0	½	½	0		½	1	½	1	1	½	5½	0	3	27.25	2756	75
7	Sergey Karjakin (RUS)	2786	0	½	½	½	0	½		½	½	½	½	1	5	1	1	26.00	2722	50
8	Anish Giri (NED)	2727	½	½	½	½	½	0	½		½	½	½	½	5	1	0	27.75	2727	50
9	Peter Leko (HUN)	2744	0	½	½	½	½	½	½	½		½	½	½	5	1	0	26.50	2725	50
10	Teimour Radjabov (AZE)	2793	½	½	1	0	0	0	½	½	½		½	½	4½	1	1	25.25	2689	20
11	Rustam Kasimdzhanov (UZB)	2709	½	0	½	0	1	0	½	½	½	½		½	4½	1	1	24.50	2696	20
12	Shakhriyar Mamedyarov (AZE)	2766	½	0	½	½	½	½	0	½	½	½	½		4½	1	0	25.00	2691	20

=== Thessaloniki 2013 ===
4th stage, Thessaloniki, Greece, 22 May – 3 June 2013
	Player	Rating	1	2	3	4	5	6	7	8	9	10	11	12	Total	H2H	Wins	SB	TPR	GP
1	Leinier Domínguez (CUB)	2723		1	0	½	½	1	½	1	1	½	1	1	8	—	6	40.00	2926	170
2	Fabiano Caruana (ITA)	2774	0		1	½	½	½	½	1	½	1	1	1	7½	1	5	37.00	2883	125
3	Gata Kamsky (USA)	2741	1	0		½	½	1	1	½	1	½	1	½	7½	0	5	39.00	2886	125
4	Ruslan Ponomariov (UKR)	2742	½	½	½		½	0	½	½	½	1	½	1	6	½	2	31.00	2785	85
5	Alexander Grischuk (RUS)	2779	½	½	½	½		½	1	½	½	½	½	½	6	½	1	32.50	2782	85
6	Rustam Kasimdzhanov (UZB)	2699	0	½	0	1	½		1	½	½	½	½	½	5½	—	2	28.00	2757	70
7	Hikaru Nakamura (USA)	2775	½	½	0	½	0	0		1	1	½	½	½	5	—	2	25.50	2720	60
8	Veselin Topalov (BUL)	2793	0	0	½	½	½	½	0		½	0	1	1	4½	½	2	22.25	2686	45
9	Peter Svidler (RUS)	2769	0	½	0	½	½	½	0	½		1	0	1	4½	½	2	22.25	2688	45
10	Étienne Bacrot (FRA)	2725	½	0	½	0	½	½	½	1	0		½	0	4	½	1	22.50	2659	25
11	Alexander Morozevich (RUS)	2760	0	0	0	½	½	½	½	0	1	½		½	4	½	1	19.50	2656	25
12	Vassily Ivanchuk (UKR)	2755	0	0	½	0	½	½	½	0	0	1	½		3½	—	1	18.00	2621	10

=== Beijing 2013 ===
5th stage, Beijing, China, 4–16 July 2013
	Player	Rating	1	2	3	4	5	6	7	8	9	10	11	12	Total	H2H	Wins	SB	TPR	GP
1	Shakhriyar Mamedyarov (AZE)	2761		0	1	½	1	½	0	1	½	1	1	½	7	—	5	37.00	2847	170
2	Alexander Grischuk (RUS)	2780	1		½	½	½	1	½	½	0	½	½	1	6½	—	3	35.25	2812	140
3	Veselin Topalov (BUL)	2767	0	½		½	1	½	1	0	1	½	½	½	6	½	3	31.75	2781	100
4	Peter Leko (HUN)	2737	½	½	½		1	½	½	½	½	½	½	½	6	½	1	32.75	2784	100
5	Sergey Karjakin (RUS)	2776	0	½	0	0		½	1	1	½	1	½	½	5½	2½	3	28.75	2750	65
6	Wang Yue (CHN)	2705	½	0	½	½	½		½	½	½	1	0	1	5½	1½	2	28.75	2755	65
7	Alexander Morozevich (RUS)	2736	1	½	0	½	0	½		½	1	½	0	1	5½	1	3	29.75	2752	65
8	Anish Giri (NED)	2734	0	½	1	½	0	½	½		1	0	½	1	5½	1	3	28.75	2753	65
9	Boris Gelfand (ISR)	2773	½	1	0	½	½	½	0	0		½	1	½	5	1½	2	27.75	2718	30
10	Wang Hao (CHN)	2752	0	½	½	½	0	0	½	1	½		½	1	5	1	2	26.00	2720	30
11	Vassily Ivanchuk (UKR)	2733	0	½	½	½	½	1	1	½	0	½		0	5	½	2	28.25	2722	30
12	Gata Kamsky (USA)	2763	½	0	½	½	½	0	0	0	½	0	1		3½	—	1	19.75	2618	10

=== Paris 2013 ===
6th stage, Paris, France, 22 September – 4 October 2013
	Player	Rating	1	2	3	4	5	6	7	8	9	10	11	12	Total	H2H	Wins	SB	TPR	GP
1	Fabiano Caruana (ITA)	2779		1	0	½	½	½	1	½	1	½	1	½	7	1	4	30.00	2840	155
2	Boris Gelfand (ISR)	2764	0		1	½	1	1	½	½	½	½	½	1	7	0	4	30.00	2841	155
3	Hikaru Nakamura (USA)	2772	1	0		1	½	½	1	½	½	½	½	½	6½	1	3	28.50	2807	100
4	Étienne Bacrot (FRA)	2723	½	½	0		½	½	½	1	½	½	1	1	6½	0	3	28.00	2811	100
5	Alexander Grischuk (RUS)	2785	½	0	½	½		½	1	½	½	½	0	1	5½	½	2	23.75	2743	75
6	Leinier Domínguez (CUB)	2757	½	0	½	½	½		½	½	½	½	½	1	5½	½	1	25.00	2745	75
7	Vassily Ivanchuk (UKR)	2731	0	½	0	½	0	½		½	½	1	1	½	5	2	2	20.75	2716	45
8	Ruslan Ponomariov (UKR)	2756	½	½	½	0	½	½	½		½	½	½	½	5	1½	0	23.75	2714	45
9	Evgeny Tomashevsky (RUS)	2703	0	½	½	½	½	½	½	½		½	½	½	5	1½	0	23.50	2718	45
10	Wang Hao (CHN)	2736	½	½	½	½	½	½	0	½	½		½	½	5	1½	0	24.50	2716	45
11	Laurent Fressinet (FRA)	2708	0	½	½	0	1	½	0	½	½	½		½	4½	—	1	18.75	2686	20
12	Anish Giri (NED)	2737	½	0	½	0	0	0	½	½	½	½	½		3½	—	0	15.50	2615	10

== Grand Prix standings ==
Grand Prix points in bold indicate a tournament win. A number in brackets is a player's worst result of four and doesn't add to the total.

Veselin Topalov finished first, and Shakhriyar Mamedyarov was second in the overall standings. Thus, they qualified for the Candidates Tournament 2014.

Karjakin and Svidler qualified for the Candidates by other paths, so are shown in light green.

	Player	FIDE rating Aug 2012	LON	TAS	ZUG	THE	BEI	PAR	Played	Best 3
1	**Veselin Topalov (BUL)**	2752	**140**	—	**170**	(45)	100	—	4	**410**
2	Shakhriyar Mamedyarov (AZE)	2729	**140**	80	(20)	—	**170**	—	4	**390**
3	Fabiano Caruana (ITA)	2773	—	(80)	100	125	—	**155**	4	380
4	Boris Gelfand (ISR)	2738	**140**	(30)	—	—	30	**155**	4	325
5	Alexander Grischuk (RUS)	2763	90	—	—	85	140	(75)	4	315
6	Hikaru Nakamura (USA)	2778	(15)	—	140	60	—	100	4	300
7	Alexander Morozevich (RUS)	2770	—	**140**	75	(25)	65	—	4	280
8	Leinier Domínguez (CUB)	2725	35	(20)	—	**170**	—	75	4	280
9	Sergey Karjakin (RUS)^{[5]}	2785	—	**140**	50	—	65	—	3	255
10	Wang Hao (CHN)	2726	70	**140**	—	—	(30)	45	4	255
11	Ruslan Ponomariov (UKR)	2734	—	50	100	85	—	(45)	4	235
12	Peter Leko (HUN)	2737	80	50	(50)	—	100	—	4	230
13	Gata Kamsky (USA)^{[2]}	2746	—	10	75	125	(10)	—	4	210
14	Rustam Kasimdzhanov (UZB)	2684	35	80	(20)	70	—	—	4	185
15	Vassily Ivanchuk (UKR)	2769	55	—	—	(10)	30	45	4	130
16	Anish Giri (NED)	2711	15	—	50	—	65	(10)	4	130
17	Étienne Bacrot (FRA)^{[3]}^{[5]}	2713	—	—	—	25	—	100	2	125
18	Peter Svidler (RUS)^{[1]}^{[5]}	2749	—	50	—	45	—	—	2	95
19	Wang Yue (CHN)^{[4]}	2685	—	—	—	—	65	—	1	65
20	Michael Adams (ENG)^{[1]}	2722	55	—	—	—	—	—	1	55
21	Evgeny Tomashevsky (RUS)^{[5]}	2730	—	—	—	—	—	45	1	45
22	Teimour Radjabov (AZE)^{[3]}^{[4]}^{[5]}	2788	—	—	20	—	—	—	1	20
22	Laurent Fressinet (FRA)^{[5]}	2714	—	—	—	—	—	20	1	20

== Notes ==
- ^{1} In the London Grand Prix, Adams replaced Svidler, who withdrew for family reasons.
- ^{2} Kamsky replaced Gashimov, who had to withdraw his place due to illness before playing in any Grand Prix.
- ^{3} In the Thessaloniki Grand Prix, Bacrot replaced Radjabov, who withdrew for personal reasons.
- ^{4} Wang Yue replaced Radjabov in the Beijing Grand Prix.
- ^{5} Tomashevsky, Fressinet and Bacrot replaced Karjakin, Radjabov and Svidler in the Paris Grand Prix.
