= Gashimov Memorial =

Chess tournament

Tournament information
- Sport: Chess
- Location: Shamkir, Azerbaijan (until 2019)
- Established: 2014
- Format: Round-robin tournament
- Most championships: (Norway) Magnus Carlsen (4)

Current champion
- (FIDE) Ian Nepomniachtchi

The Gashimov Memorial is a chess supertournament played in Azerbaijan in memory of Vugar Gashimov (24th July 1986– 11th January 2014).

== Winners ==
#	Year	Winner
1	2014	Magnus Carlsen (Norway)
2	2015	Magnus Carlsen (Norway)
3	2016	Shakhriyar Mamedyarov (Azerbaijan)
4	2017	Shakhriyar Mamedyarov (Azerbaijan)
5	2018	Magnus Carlsen (Norway)
6	2019	Magnus Carlsen (Norway)
7	2021	Fabiano Caruana (United States)
8	2022	Nodirbek Abdusattorov (Uzbekistan)
9	2023	Vidit Gujrathi (India)
10	2024	Ian Nepomniachtchi (FIDE)
11	2025	Ian Nepomniachtchi (FIDE)

== 2014 ==
The Gashimov Memorial 2014 took place in the Heydar Aliyev Centre in Shamkir City from 16 April to 30 April 2014, consisting of two tournaments, with invited players Magnus Carlsen, Hikaru Nakamura, Sergey Karjakin, Fabiano Caruana, Shakhriyar Mamedyarov, and Teimour Radjabov making up the A Tournament. The Elo average for the A Tournament was 2780, making it a Category 22 event and one of the highest rated tournaments of all time.

The A Tournament was held as a double round robin, with each player facing the other with both colours, while the B Tournament was held as a single round robin.

The total prize fund for the A tournament was €100,000, while the prize fund for the B tournament was €30,000.

In the A Tournament, in spite of losing consecutive games early on, Magnus Carlsen won after a last round White win over Fabiano Caruana who finished second.

In the B Tournament, Pavel Eljanov won two and drew one of his last three games to take first place.

1st Shamkir Chess, Group A, 20–30 April 2014, Şəmkir, Azerbaijan, Category XXII (2780)
	Player	Rating	1	2	3	4	5	6	Points	Wins	TPR
1	Magnus Carlsen (Norway)	2881		0 1	0 ½	½ ½	1 1	1 1	6½	5	2868
2	Fabiano Caruana (Italy)	2783	1 0		½ 1	½ ½	½ ½	0 1	5½	3	2814
3	Teimour Radjabov (Azerbaijan)	2713	1 ½	½ 0		½ ½	½ ½	½ ½	5	1	2793
4	Sergey Karjakin (Russia)	2772	½ ½	½ ½	½ ½		½ ½	½ ½	5	0	2781
5	Hikaru Nakamura (United States)	2772	0 0	½ ½	½ ½	½ ½		1 1	5	2	2781
6	Shakhriyar Mamedyarov (Azerbaijan)	2760	0 0	1 0	½ ½	½ ½	0 0		3	1	2638

1st Shamkir Chess, Group B, 20–30 April 2014, Şəmkir, Azerbaijan, Category XVII (2663)
	Player	Rating	1	2	3	4	5	6	7	8	9	10	Points	Wins	TPR
1	Pavel Eljanov (Ukraine)	2732		½	0	1	1	½	½	½	1	1	6	4	2775
2	Alexander Motylev (Russia)	2685	½		0	1	0	½	1	½	1	1	5½	4	2738
3	Wang Hao (China)	2734	1	1		½	½	½	0	½	½	½	5	2	2694
4	Étienne Bacrot (France)	2722	0	0	½		½	½	1	1	1	½	5	2	2695
5	Radosław Wojtaszek (Poland)	2716	0	1	½	½		½	0	½	½	1	4½	2	2657
6	Nijat Abasov (Azerbaijan)	2516	½	½	½	½	½		½	½	0	½	4	0	2640
7	Rauf Mamedov (Azerbaijan)	2660	½	0	1	0	1	½		0	½	½	4	2	2625
8	Vasif Durarbayli (Azerbaijan)	2584	½	½	½	0	½	½	1		0	½	4	1	2632
9	Gadir Guseinov (Azerbaijan)	2621	0	0	½	0	½	1	½	1		½	4	2	2628
10	Eltaj Safarli (Azerbaijan)	2656	0	0	½	½	0	½	½	½	½		3	0	2543

== 2015 ==
The second edition of Shamkir Chess took place 16–25 April 2015.

World champion Magnus Carlsen, former world champion Viswanathan Anand and Vladimir Kramnik competed in the tournament in Azerbaijan, as well as Fabiano Caruana, Anish Giri, Wesley So, Maxime Vachier-Lagrave, Shakhriyar Mamedyarov, Michael Adams, and the Azerbaijan Champion Rauf Mamedov.

The tournament's total prize fund was €100,000.

Magnus Carlsen won the event with 7 points out of 9.

2nd Shamkir Chess, 17–26 April 2015, Şəmkir, Azerbaijan, Category XXI (2773)
	Player	Rating	1	2	3	4	5	6	7	8	9	10	Points	Wins	TPR
1	Magnus Carlsen (Norway)	2863		½	½	1	1	1	½	½	1	1	7	5	2981
2	Viswanathan Anand (India)	2791	½		1	½	½	1	1	½	½	½	6	3	2892
3	Wesley So (United States)	2788	½	0		0	½	½	1	1	½	1	5	3	2809
4	Fabiano Caruana (Italy)	2802	0	½	1		1	½	½	½	½	½	5	2	2811
5	Vladimir Kramnik (Russia)	2783	0	½	½	0		0	1	½	1	½	4	2	2735
6	Shakhriyar Mamedyarov (Azerbaijan)	2754	0	0	½	½	1		½	½	½	½	4	1	2738
7	Michael Adams (England)	2746	½	0	0	½	0	½		1	½	½	3½	1	2694
8	Anish Giri (Netherlands)	2790	½	½	0	½	½	½	0		½	½	3½	0	2697
9	Maxime Vachier-Lagrave (France)	2762	0	½	½	½	0	½	½	½		½	3½	0	2699
10	Rauf Mamedov (Azerbaijan)	2651	0	½	0	½	½	½	½	½	½		3½	0	2708

== 2016 ==
The 3rd Shamkir Chess Tournament took place from May 26 to June 4, 2016. All ratings below are from the May 2016 FIDE Rating Lists.

3rd Shamkir Chess, 26 May – 4 June 2016, Şəmkir, Azerbaijan, Category XX (2736)
	Player	Rating	1	2	3	4	5	6	7	8	9	10	Points	Wins	TPR
1	Shakhriyar Mamedyarov (Azerbaijan)	2748		1	1	½	½	0	1	½	1	½	6	4	2854
2	Fabiano Caruana (United States)	2804	0		½	½	1	½	½	1	1	1	6	4	2848
3	Anish Giri (Netherlands)	2790	0	½		1	½	1	1	½	½	½	5½	3	2808
4	Sergey Karjakin (Russia)	2779	½	½	0		½	1	½	½	½	1	5	2	2770
5	Rauf Mamedov (Azerbaijan)	2655	½	0	½	½		½	½	½	½	1	4½	1	2744
6	Pentala Harikrishna (India)	2763	1	½	0	0	½		0	½	1	½	4	2	2694
7	Eltaj Safarli (Azerbaijan)	2664	0	½	0	½	½	1		½	½	½	4	1	2704
8	Teimour Radjabov (Azerbaijan)	2726	½	0	½	½	½	½	½		½	½	4	0	2699
9	Pavel Eljanov (Ukraine)	2765	0	0	½	½	½	0	½	½		1	3½	1	2654
10	Hou Yifan (China)	2663	½	0	½	0	0	½	½	½	0		2½	0	2578

Both Mamedyarov and Caruana were equal after nine rounds. Mamedyarov won the ensuing tiebreak rounds. The first two games were 10+3, and the second two games were 5+3.

Tiebreak
Player	Rapid rating	Blitz rating	1	2	3	4	Points	Place
Shakhriyar Mamedyarov (Azerbaijan)	2791	2714	½	½	1	½	2½	1
Fabiano Caruana (United States)	2829i	2665	½	½	0	½	1½	2

== 2017 ==
4th Shamkir Chess, 21–30 April 2017, Şəmkir, Azerbaijan, Category XXI (2765)
	Player	Rating	1	2	3	4	5	6	7	8	9	10	Points	Wins	H2H	SB	TPR
1	Shakhriyar Mamedyarov (Azerbaijan)	2772		1	1	½	½	0	½	½	1	½	5½	3			2844
2	Vladimir Kramnik (Russia)	2811	0		0	½	½	½	1	½	1	1	5	3			2803
3	Wesley So (United States)	2822	0	1		½	1	½	½	½	½	½	5	2	½	22.00	2802
4	Veselin Topalov (Bulgaria)	2741	½	½	½		0	1	½	½	1	½	5	2	½	21.75	2811
5	Sergey Karjakin (Russia)	2783	½	½	0	1		½	0	½	1	½	4½	2			2763
6	Radosław Wojtaszek (Poland)	2745	1	½	½	0	½		½	½	½	½	4½	1	½	20.50	2767
7	Michael Adams (England)	2761	½	0	½	½	1	½		½	½	½	4½	1	½	20.00	2766
8	Teimour Radjabov (Azerbaijan)	2710	½	½	½	½	½	½	½		0	½	4	0			2728
9	Pavel Eljanov (Ukraine)	2751	0	0	½	0	0	½	½	1		1	3½	2			2687
10	Pentala Harikrishna (India)	2755	½	0	½	½	½	½	½	½	0		3½	0			2686

== 2018 ==
The total prize fund of the fifth edition of Shamkir Chess tournament was again set to €100,000, with the winner receiving €30,000. With an average rating of 2768, it was a category XXI tournament.

One week before the beginning of the tournament, former world champion Vladimir Kramnik sent a letter to the organization committee stating he would not participate as planned, as he desired a rest after the Candidates Tournament held in March. The organizers replaced Kramnik with the No. 1 Polish player Radosław Wojtaszek (2744).

In the last round of the tournament, Magnus Carlsen and Ding Liren faced each other. They were in first and second place, respectively, and Carlsen as white needed only a draw to reclaim the title after two years of absence from the tournament. The game was a theoretical Four Knights Game. It was clear that Ding did not want to risk his runner-up position by attempting to defeat Carlsen as black, and the game was drawn within 20 minutes. As a result, Carlsen won the tournament for the third time.

5th Shamkir Chess, 18–28 April 2018, Şəmkir, Azerbaijan, Category XXI (2768)
	Player	Rating	1	2	3	4	5	6	7	8	9	10	Points	Wins	SB	TPR
1	Magnus Carlsen (Norway)	2843		½	½	½	1	1	½	1	½	½	6	3		2885
2	Ding Liren (China)	2778	½		½	½	½	½	½	½	1	1	5½	2		2847
3	Sergey Karjakin (Russia)	2778	½	½		½	½	½	½	1	½	½	5	1		2810
4	Shakhriyar Mamedyarov (Azerbaijan)	2814	½	½	½		½	½	½	0	½	1	4½	1	19.50	2763
5	Radosław Wojtaszek (Poland)	2744	0	½	½	½		½	½	1	½	½	4½	1	19.25	2771
6	Anish Giri (Netherlands)	2777	0	½	½	½	½		½	½	½	1	4½	1	18.50	2767
7	Teimour Radjabov (Azerbaijan)	2748	½	½	½	½	½	½		½	½	½	4½	0		2770
8	Veselin Topalov (FIDE)	2749	0	½	0	1	0	½	½		½	1	4	2		2727
9	Rauf Mamedov (Azerbaijan)	2704	½	0	½	½	½	½	½	½		½	4	0		2732
10	David Navara (Czech Republic)	2745	½	0	½	0	½	0	½	0	½		2½	0		2605

== 2019 ==
6th Shamkir Chess, 31 March – 9 April 2019, Şəmkir, Azerbaijan, Category XXII (2778)
	Player	Rating	1	2	3	4	5	6	7	8	9	10	Points	Wins	SB	TPR
1	Magnus Carlsen (Norway)	2845		½	1	1	1	½	½	1	½	1	7	5		2991
2	Ding Liren (China)	2812	½		½	1	½	½	1	0	½	½	5	2	22.25	2817
3	Sergey Karjakin (Russia)	2753	0	½		½	1	½	½	½	½	1	5	2	20.25	2824
4	Alexander Grischuk (Russia)	2771	0	0	½		½	½	1	1	½	½	4½	2	20.25	2779
5	Viswanathan Anand (India)	2779	0	½	0	½		½	½	½	1	1	4½	2	18.25	2778
6	Teimour Radjabov (Azerbaijan)	2756	½	½	½	½	½		½	½	½	½	4½	0	17.50	2781
7	Veselin Topalov (Bulgaria)	2740	½	0	½	0	½	½		½	1	½	4	1	17.50	2739
8	David Navara (Czech Republic)	2739	0	1	½	0	½	½	½		½	½	4	1	17.25	2740
9	Shakhriyar Mamedyarov (Azerbaijan)	2790	½	½	½	½	0	½	0	½		½	3½	0		2697
10	Anish Giri (Netherlands)	2797	0	½	0	½	0	½	½	½	½		3	0		2651

== 2021 ==
The 2021 edition was changed to a rapid/blitz event, and held in Baku, a departure from the tournament being traditionally held in Shamkir. Fabiano Caruana won the event in an armageddon playoff against Richárd Rapport.

7th Gashimov Memorial, 17-24 December 2021, Baku, Azerbaijan
	Player	Rapid score	Blitz score	Total
1	Fabiano Caruana (United States)	14	10	24
2	Richárd Rapport (Hungary)	16	8	24
3	Shakhriyar Mamedyarov (Azerbaijan)	14	8½	22½
4	Sergey Karjakin (Russia)	16	5	21
5	Rauf Mamedov (Azerbaijan)	9	6½	15½
6	David Navara (Czech Republic)	8	6	14
7	Vugar Asadli (Azerbaijan)	4	6	10
8	Viswanathan Anand (India)	3	6	9

== 2022 ==
The 2022 edition remained the same as that of the previous year; being a rapid/blitz event held in Baku.

8th Gashimov Memorial, 16-24 December 2022, Baku, Azerbaijan
	Player	Rapid score	Blitz score	Total
1	Nodirbek Abdusattorov (Uzbekistan)	14	11½	25½
2	Shakhriyar Mamedyarov (Azerbaijan)	8	12½	20½
3	Rauf Mamedov (Azerbaijan)	12	8½	20½
4	Richárd Rapport (Hungary)	8	12	20
5	Francisco Vallejo Pons (Spain)	12	7½	19½
6	Wang Hao (China)	10	9	19
7	Sam Shankland (United States)	6	11	17
8	Gukesh D (India)	7	8	15
9	Abdulla Gadimbayli (Azerbaijan)	7	5	12
10	Aydin Suleymanli (Azerbaijan)	6	5	11

== 2023 ==
The 2023 edition was held in Qabala.

9th Gashimov Memorial, 7-11 December 2023, Qabala, Azerbaijan
	Player	Rapid score	Blitz score	Total
1	Vidit Gujrathi (India)	10	12	22
2	Arjun Erigaisi (India)	10	11½	21½
3	Richárd Rapport (Romania)	7	12	19
4	Rauf Mamedov (Azerbaijan)	9	9½	18½
5	Aydin Suleymanli (Azerbaijan)	11	7½	18½
6	Teimour Radjabov (Azerbaijan)	8	10	18
7	Shakhriyar Mamedyarov (Azerbaijan)	8	10	18
8	Jorden van Foreest (Netherlands)	10	7	17
9	Nijat Abasov (Azerbaijan)	9	6	15
10	Boris Gelfand (Israel)	8	4½	12½

== 2024 ==
The 2024 edition was held in Shusha.

10th Gashimov Memorial, 26-28 September 2024, Shusha, Azerbaijan
	Player	Rapid score	Blitz score	Total
1	Ian Nepomniachtchi (FIDE)	10	9	19
2	Nodirbek Abdusattorov (Uzbekistan)	8	10	18
3	Shakhriyar Mamedyarov (Azerbaijan)	9	7	16
4	Vladislav Artemiev (FIDE)	8	6½	14½
5	Aydin Suleymanli (Azerbaijan)	6	7½	13½
6	Aravindh Chithambaram (India)	5	8	13
7	Rauf Mamedov (Azerbaijan)	4	5	9
8	Richárd Rapport (Hungary)	6	3	9

== 2025 ==
The 2025 edition was held in Khankendi (Stepanakert). It was changed into six-player double round-robin event. Ian Nepomniachtchi won the event on tiebreaks after having better Head-to-head score than Vladimir Fedoseev.

11th Gashimov Memorial, 9-11 December 2025, Khankendi, Azerbaijan
	Player	Rapid score	Blitz score	Total
1	Ian Nepomniachtchi (FIDE)	6½	6½	13
2	Vladimir Fedoseev (Slovenia)	6	7	13
3	Rauf Mamedov (Azerbaijan)	4½	6	10½
4	Nodirbek Yakubboev (Uzbekistan)	5	4½	9½
5	Amin Tabatabaei (Iran)	5	3	8
6	Aydin Suleymanli (Azerbaijan)	3	3	6
