= Kateryna Dolzhykova =

Ukrainian chess player (born 1988)

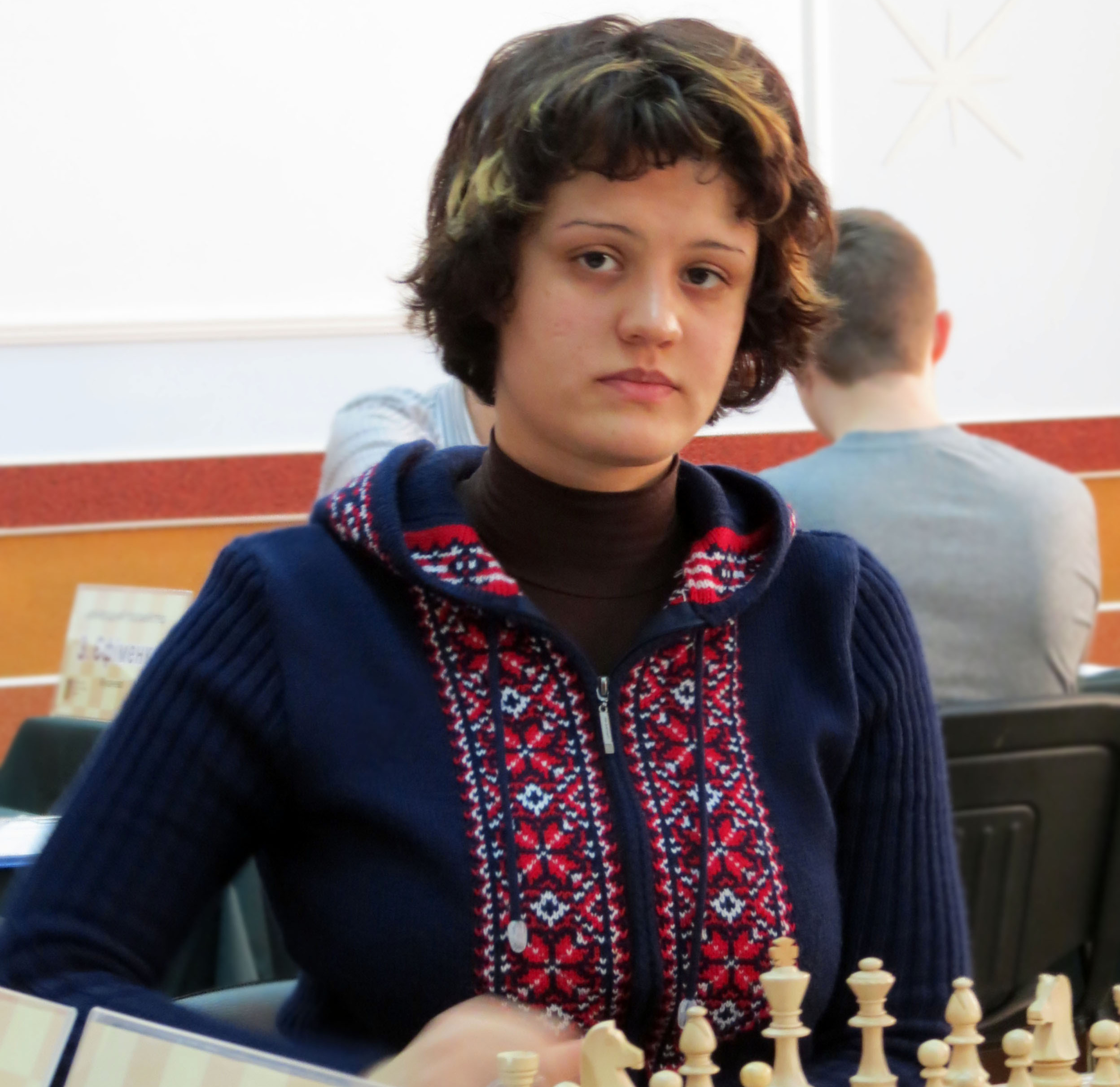
- Kateryna Dolzhykova, 2015

Personal information
- Born: September 25, 1988 (age 37) Kyiv, Ukrainian SSR, Soviet Union
- Spouse: Sergey Karjakin (m. 2009, divorced)

Chess career
- Country: Ukraine (until 2023); Germany (since 2023)
- Title: Woman Grandmaster (2024)
- Peak rating: 2351 (October 2008)

Kateryna Oleksandrivna Dolzhykova (Ukrainian: Катери́на Олекса́ндрівна До́лжикова; born September 25, 1988, in Kyiv) is a Ukrainian chess player (representing Germany since 2023) holding the title Woman Grandmaster (WGM).

== Chess career ==
She won the Ukrainian women's championship in 2011. Dolzhykova played on the silver medal–winning Ukrainian team in the women's team event of rapid chess at the 2008 World Mind Sports Games.

On July 24, 2009, she married chess grandmaster Sergey Karjakin. The marriage later broke up. Her sister Olga Dolzhykova is also a chess player, who holds the title of Woman Grandmaster (WGM).
