= Tal Memorial =

Chess tournament

Tournament information
- Sport: Chess
- Location: Moscow, Russia
- Established: 2006
- Defunct: 2018
- Format: Round-robin tournament

The Tal Memorial was an annual chess tournament played in Moscow from 2006 to 2018 with the exception of 2015, to honour the memory of the former World Champion Mikhail Tal (1936–1992).

Many of the world's strongest players compete. In 2014 it was held only as a blitz tournament and the classical event was replaced by the TASHIR Petrosian Memorial. It returned in October 2016.

== Format ==
The inaugural Tal Memorial was held as a ten-player single round robin event with a classical time control of two hours for the first 40 moves, one hour for the next 20 moves, then 15 minutes for the rest of the game and 30 seconds added per move from move 60. The time control changed for subsequent editions to 100 minutes for 40 moves, then 50 minutes for the next 20 moves, then 15 minutes with 30 seconds added per move from move one. Draws could not be agreed before move 40.

For 2012 and 2013, a round-robin blitz tournament was held in order to decide the pairings for the main event with time control of 3 minutes plus two seconds per move. In 2014, the classical part did not take place and the Tal Memorial became solely a blitz tournament with the time control of 4 minutes plus 2 seconds per move in a double round robin of twelve players.

In case of a tie the placings were decided by: number of games played with Black, number of wins, direct encounter, Koja co-efficient and Sonneborn-Berger score. In 2010 Levon Aronian and Sergey Karjakin shared the title as their tiebreaks were all equal.

== Tournament winners ==
Tal Memorial
#	Year	Avg. Elo	Winner	Rounds	Score
1	2006	2727	Peter Leko (Hungary); Ruslan Ponomariov (Ukraine); Levon Aronian (Armenia)	9	5½
2	2007	2741	Vladimir Kramnik (Russia)	9	6½
3	2008	2738	Vasyl Ivanchuk (Ukraine)	9	6
4	2009	2761	Vladimir Kramnik (Russia)	9	6
5	2010	2757	Levon Aronian (Armenia); Sergey Karjakin (Russia); Shakhriyar Mamedyarov (Azerbaijan)	9	5½
6	2011	2776	Magnus Carlsen (Norway); Levon Aronian (Armenia)	9	5½
7	2012	2777	Magnus Carlsen (Norway)	9	5½
8	2013	2777	Boris Gelfand (Israel)	9	6
9	2014 (blitz)	2777	Shakhriyar Mamedyarov (Azerbaijan)	22	16
10	2016	2760	Ian Nepomniachtchi (Russia)	9	6
11	2018 (rapid) 2018 (blitz)	2757.1 2781.5	Viswanathan Anand (India) Sergey Karjakin (Russia)	9 13	6 10

== Results ==
=== 2006 ===
1st Tal Memorial, 6–16 November 2006, Moscow, Russia, Category XX (2727)
	Player	Rating	1	2	3	4	5	6	7	8	9	10	Points	SB	TPR
1	Peter Leko (Hungary)	2741		½	½	1	½	½	½	½	½	1	5½	23.75	2806
2	Ruslan Ponomariov (Ukraine)	2703	½		½	½	½	1	½	½	½	1	5½	23.50	2810
3	Levon Aronian (Armenia)	2741	½	½		½	½	½	0	1	1	1	5½	22.50	2806
4	Boris Gelfand (Israel)	2733	0	½	½		½	½	1	½	1	½	5		2769
5	Shakhriyar Mamedyarov (Azerbaijan)	2728	½	½	½	½		½	½	½	½	½	4½	20.25	2727
6	Alexander Grischuk (Russia)	2710	½	0	½	½	½		1	1	½	0	4½	20.00	2729
7	Peter Svidler (Russia)	2750	½	½	1	0	½	0		½	½	1	4½	19.75	2725
8	Alexei Shirov (Spain)	2720	½	½	0	½	½	0	½		½	½	3½	15.75	2648
9	Magnus Carlsen (Norway)	2698	½	½	0	0	½	½	½	½		½	3½	15.50	2650
10	Alexander Morozevich (Russia)	2747	0	0	0	½	½	1	0	½	½		3		2600

(Georgia (country)) Jobava, (Ukraine) Karjakin (both — 12 points out of 18), (Azerbaijan) Radjabov, (Russia) Jakovenko, (Moldova) Bologan and (Russia) Timofeev (all — 11½ out of 18) qualified as the winners of 40-players 9-round (two games per round) qualification tournament taken place 16–17 November 2006.

1st Tal Memorial Blitz Cup, 18–19 November 2006, Moscow, Russia
	Player	Rating	1	2	3	4	5	6	7	8	9	10	11	12	13	14	15	16	17	18	Points	SB
1	Viswanathan Anand (India)	2779		1	1½	1½	1½	1½	1½	1	1	1½	1	1	1½	1½	1	1½	1½	2	23	
2	Levon Aronian (Armenia)	2741	1		1½	½	2	1½	1	2	1½	1	0	1	1	1	1	1	2	2	21	
3	Teimour Radjabov (Azerbaijan)	2729	½	½		1	½	1	1	1½	1	2	2	1	1	1	1½	1½	2	1½	20½	324.75
4	Peter Svidler (Russia)	2750	½	1½	1		0	½	0	2	1½	1½	½	2	½	1½	2	1½	2	2	20½	321.50
5	Ruslan Ponomariov (Ukraine)	2703	½	0	1½	2		1	½	1	2	½	1½	1	1½	1	1½	1½	1½	1	19½	
6	Alexander Morozevich (Russia)	2747	½	½	1	1½	1		1½	1	1	2	1	1	1½	½	1½	0	1½	1	18	305.25
7	Alexander Grischuk (Russia)	2710	½	1	1	2	1½	½		1	0	0	1	1	1½	½	1½	1	2	2	18	289.75
8	Boris Gelfand (Israel)	2733	1	0	½	0	1	1	1		1	1½	1	1	1	1	1½	1½	2	2	18	277.00
9	Magnus Carlsen (Norway)	2698	1	½	1	½	0	1	2	1		1	½	½	2	1	1½	1½	½	2	17½	283.25
10	Anatoly Karpov (Russia)	2668	½	1	0	½	1½	0	2	½	1		½	2	1	1	1½	1½	1½	1½	17½	278.00
11	Sergey Karjakin (Ukraine)	2672	1	2	0	1½	½	1	1	1	1½	1½		0	½	2	½	1	1	1	17	290.75
12	Shakhriyar Mamedyarov (Azerbaijan)	2728	1	1	1	0	1	1	1	1	1½	0	2		1	1	1	2	1	½	17	282.75
13	Judit Polgár (Hungary)	2710	½	1	1	1½	½	½	½	1	0	1	1½	1		1	1	2	2	1	17	271.50
14	Peter Leko (Hungary)	2741	½	1	1	½	1	1½	1½	1	1	1	0	1	1		1	1½	1	1	16½	
15	Dmitry Jakovenko (Russia)	2671	1	1	½	0	½	½	½	½	½	½	1½	1	1	1		2	1½	2	15½	
16	Victor Bologan (Moldova)	2659	½	1	½	½	½	2	1	½	½	½	1	0	0	½	0		½	1	10½	
17	Artyom Timofeev (Russia)	2662	½	0	0	0	½	½	0	0	1½	½	1	1	0	1	½	1½		1½	10	
18	Baadur Jobava (Georgia)	2650	0	0	½	0	1	1	0	0	0	½	1	1½	1	1	0	1	½		9	

=== 2007 ===
2nd Tal Memorial, 10–19 November 2007, Moscow, Russia, Category XX (2742)
	Player	Rating	1	2	3	4	5	6	7	8	9	10	Points	TPR
1	Vladimir Kramnik (Russia)	2785		1	½	½	½	1	½	½	1	1	6½	2902
2	Alexei Shirov (Spain)	2739	0		½	1	½	0	½	1	½	1	5	2784
3-6	Boris Gelfand (Israel)	2736	½	½		½	½	½	½	½	½	½	4½	2741
3-6	Magnus Carlsen (Norway)	2714	½	0	½		1	½	½	½	½	½	4½	2744
3-6	Dmitry Jakovenko (Russia)	2710	½	½	½	0		½	½	1	½	½	4½	2744
3-6	Peter Leko (Hungary)	2755	0	1	½	½	½		½	½	½	½	4½	2739
7-9	Vasyl Ivanchuk (Ukraine)	2787	½	½	½	½	½	½		½	0	½	4	2693
7-9	Gata Kamsky (United States)	2714	½	0	½	½	0	½	½		1	½	4	2701
7-9	Shakhriyar Mamedyarov (Azerbaijan)	2752	0	½	½	½	½	½	1	0		½	4	2697
10	Evgeny Alekseev (Russia)	2716	0	0	½	½	½	½	½	½	½		3½	2664

=== 2008 ===
3rd Tal Memorial, 19–28 August 2008, Moscow, Russia, Category XX (2745)
	Player	Rating	1	2	3	4	5	6	7	8	9	10	Points	TPR
1	Vasyl Ivanchuk (Ukraine)	2781		1	½	½	½	1	1	½	½	½	6	2866
2	Alexander Morozevich (Russia)	2788	0		1	1	½	½	0	1	½	½	5	2783
3	Ruslan Ponomariov (Ukraine)	2718	½	0		½	½	1	½	½	½	1	5	2791
4	Vladimir Kramnik (Russia)	2788	½	0	½		½	½	½	1	½	1	5	2783
5	Boris Gelfand (Israel)	2720	½	½	½	½		½	½	½	1	½	5	2791
6	Peter Leko (Hungary)	2741	0	½	0	½	½		1	½	½	1	4½	2745
7	Gata Kamsky (United States)	2723	0	1	½	½	½	0		½	0	1	4	2704
8	Evgeny Alekseev (Russia)	2708	½	0	½	0	½	½	½		1	½	4	2706
9	Shakhriyar Mamedyarov (Azerbaijan)	2742	½	½	½	½	0	½	1	0		0	3½	2665
10	Alexei Shirov (Spain)	2741	½	½	0	0	½	0	0	½	1		3	2620

(Russia) Grischuk, (Slovakia) Movsesian (both — 12½ points out of 18), (Russia) Grachev, (Ukraine) Karjakin and (Ukraine) Eljanov (all — 12 out of 18) qualified as the winners of 60-players qualification blitz tournament taken place 27–28 August 2008. (Norway) Carlsen and (Russia) Karpov were invited by the organizers.

3rd Tal Memorial Blitz, 29–30 August 2008, Moscow, Cat. XX (2726)
	Player	Rating	Points	TPR
1	Vasyl Ivanchuk (Ukraine)	2781	23½	2863
2	Vladimir Kramnik (Russia)	2788	22½	2839
3	Magnus Carlsen (Norway)	2775	21	2810
4	Peter Svidler (Russia)	2738	20	2790
5	Shakhriyar Mamedyarov (Azerbaijan)	2742	20	2790
6	Peter Leko (Hungary)	2741	18	2746
7	Alexander Grischuk (Russia)	2728	18	2747
8	Sergey Karjakin (Ukraine)	2727	18	2747
9	Gata Kamsky (United States)	2723	17½	2733
10	Boris Gelfand (Israel)	2720	17½	2733
11	Ruslan Ponomariov (Ukraine)	2718	17	2726
12	Boris Grachev (Russia)	2640	14½	2681
13	Evgeny Alekseev (Russia)	2708	14	2662
14	Anatoly Karpov (Russia)	2651	14	2665
15	Alexander Morozevich (Russia)	2788	14	2657
16	Sergei Movsesian (Slovakia)	2723	12½	2631
17	Pavel Eljanov (Ukraine)	2716	12½	2631
18	Vladislav Tkachiev (France)	2664	11½	2612

=== 2009 ===
The 2009 competition was held from 5 to 14 November, with 10 of the 13 highest rated players participating: Viswanathan Anand, then the World Champion, Levon Aronian, Vladimir Kramnik, former world champion, Magnus Carlsen, the world champion of 2013, Peter Leko, Vasyl Ivanchuk, Boris Gelfand, Alexander Morozevich, Ruslan Ponomariov and Peter Svidler. The Elo average was 2761 (Category XXI), which was the highest ever reached by the tournament, trailing only the 2011, 2012, and 2013 tournaments. It was won solidly by Vladimir Kramnik with a +3 score, i.e. three wins and six draws. Ivanchuk and Carlsen shared second place with +2.

4th Tal Memorial, 4–14 November 2009, Moscow, Russia, Category XXI (2764)
	Player	Rating	1	2	3	4	5	6	7	8	9	10	Points	TPR
1	Vladimir Kramnik (Russia)	2772		½	½	½	½	½	1	1	½	1	6	2888
2	Vasyl Ivanchuk (Ukraine)	2739	½		½	½	½	1	½	½	½	1	5½	2847
3	Magnus Carlsen (Norway)	2801	½	½		½	½	½	1	½	1	½	5½	2840
4	Levon Aronian (Armenia)	2786	½	½	½		1	0	½	½	1	½	5	2804
5	Viswanathan Anand (India)	2788	½	½	½	0		½	½	1	1	½	5	2804
6	Boris Gelfand (Israel)	2758	½	0	½	1	½		½	½	½	½	4½	2765
7	Ruslan Ponomariov (Ukraine)	2739	0	½	0	½	½	½		½	½	1	4	2724
8	Peter Svidler (Russia)	2754	0	½	½	½	0	½	½		½	½	3½	2685
9	Peter Leko (Hungary)	2752	½	½	0	0	0	½	½	½		½	3	2640
10	Alexander Morozevich (Russia)	2750	0	0	½	½	½	½	0	½	½		3	2640

=== 2010 ===
The 2010 competition was held from 4 to 18 November, at the GUM Exhibition Hall in Red Square, Moscow. Many of the world's top players participated: in order of Elo rating, Levon Aronian, Vladimir Kramnik, Alexander Grischuk, Shakhriyar Mamedyarov, Sergey Karjakin, Pavel Eljanov, Boris Gelfand, Hikaru Nakamura, Alexei Shirov, and Wang Hao. Aronian and Karjakin shared first place with 5½/9. Mamedyarov scored the same number of points, but due to his loss to Gelfand was awarded third place on tie-break. The average Elo was 2757 (Category XXI).

5th Tal Memorial, 5–14 November 2010, Moscow, Russia, Category XXI (2757)
	Player	Rating	1	2	3	4	5	6	7	8	9	10	Points	TPR
1-2	Levon Aronian (Armenia)	2801		½	½	½	½	½	1	1	½	½	5½	2832
1-2	Sergey Karjakin (Russia)	2760	½		½	½	½	½	1	1	½	½	5½	2837
3	Shakhriyar Mamedyarov (Azerbaijan)	2763	½	½		½	½	1	½	0	1	1	5½	2837
4	Alexander Grischuk (Russia)	2771	½	½	½		½	½	½	½	½	1	5	2799
5	Hikaru Nakamura (United States)	2741	½	½	½	½		½	½	½	½	1	5	2802
6	Wang Hao (China)	2727	½	½	0	½	½		½	1	1	½	5	2804
7	Vladimir Kramnik (Russia)	2791	0	0	½	½	½	½		½	1	1	4½	2753
8	Boris Gelfand (Israel)	2741	0	0	1	½	½	0	½		1	0	3½	2679
9	Alexei Shirov (Spain)	2735	½	½	0	½	½	0	0	0		1	3	2635
10	Pavel Eljanov (Ukraine)	2742	½	½	0	0	0	½	0	1	0		2½	2593

=== 2011 ===
The 2011 competition was held from 16 to 25 November. Magnus Carlsen, Viswanathan Anand, Levon Aronian and Vladimir Kramnik; all four rated 2800+ at the time of the tournament participated. Seven out of the world's top ten players participated in the tournament, and its average Elo of 2776 (Category 22) was at the time the highest in history. Both Magnus Carlsen and Levon Aronian finished on 5½/9 (a +2 score, two wins and seven draws). Due to the tie-break rules of the tournament Magnus Carlsen was declared the winner because he played the black pieces five times, while Levon Aronian played the black pieces only four times.

6th Tal Memorial, 16–25 November 2011, Moscow, Russia, Category XXII (2776)
	Player	Rating	1	2	3	4	5	6	7	8	9	10	Points	Black	TPR
1	Magnus Carlsen (Norway)	2826		½	½	½	½	½	½	½	1	1	5½	5	2851
2	Levon Aronian (Armenia)	2802	½		½	½	1	1	½	½	½	½	5½	4	2854
3-4	Sergey Karjakin (Russia)	2763	½	½		½	½	½	½	½	1	½	5	5	2821
3-4	Ian Nepomniachtchi (Russia)	2730	½	½	½		½	½	½	1	½	½	5	5	2825
5	Vasyl Ivanchuk (Ukraine)	2775	½	0	½	½		1	½	½	½	1	5	4	2820
6	Peter Svidler (Russia)	2755	½	0	½	½	0		½	1	½	1	4½	5	2779
7	Viswanathan Anand (India)	2811	½	½	½	½	½	½		½	½	½	4½	4	2773
8	Vladimir Kramnik (Russia)	2800	½	½	½	0	½	0	½		½	½	3½	4	2694
9	Boris Gelfand (Israel)	2744	0	½	0	½	½	½	½	½		½	3½	4	2700
10	Hikaru Nakamura (United States)	2758	0	½	½	½	0	0	½	½	½		3		2653

=== 2012 ===
The Tal Memorial 2012 took place from 7 to 18 June 2012, with participants Magnus Carlsen, Levon Aronian, Vladimir Kramnik, Teimour Radjabov, Alexander Grischuk, Hikaru Nakamura, Fabiano Caruana, Alexander Morozevich, Evgeny Tomashevsky and Luke McShane. This tournament was a Category 22 event (average Elo rating of 2776.4). A blitz chess tournament on June 7 preceded the main with a separate prize fund to determine the numbering of the players in the main tournament.

7th Tal Memorial Blitz, 7 June 2012, Moscow, Russia
	Player	Rating	1	2	3	4	5	6	7	8	9	10	Points	Black	Wins	H2H	Koya
1	Alexander Morozevich (Russia)	2769		1	1	½	0	½	½	1	1	1	6½	5			
2	Magnus Carlsen (Norway)	2835	0		1	1	0	½	1	1	1	1	6½	4			
3	Alexander Grischuk (Russia)	2761	0	0		½	½	1	1	1	½	1	5½	5			
4	Teimour Radjabov (Azerbaijan)	2784	½	0	½		1	1	1	1	0	½	5½	4			
5	Levon Aronian (Armenia)	2825	1	1	½	0		½	½	½	1	0	5	4	3	½	18.25
6	Hikaru Nakamura (United States)	2775	½	½	0	0	½		½	1	1	1	5	4	3	½	9.00
7	Evgeny Tomashevsky (Russia)	2738	½	0	0	0	½	½		0	1	1	3½				
8	Luke McShane (England)	2706	0	0	0	0	½	0	1		1	½	3				
9	Vladimir Kramnik (Russia)	2801	0	0	½	1	0	0	0	0		1	2½				
10	Fabiano Caruana (Italy)	2770	0	0	0	½	1	0	0	½	0		2				

7th Tal Memorial, 8–19 June 2012, Moscow, Russia, Category XXII (2777)
	Player	Rating	1	2	3	4	5	6	7	8	9	10	Points	Black	Wins	H2H	Koya	TPR
1	Magnus Carlsen (Norway)	2835		½	1	½	½	½	½	1	½	½	5½					2850
2	Fabiano Caruana (Italy)	2770	½		½	1	0	0	½	1	½	1	5	5	3			2820
3	Teimour Radjabov (Azerbaijan)	2784	0	½		½	½	½	½	1	½	1	5	4	2			2819
4	Vladimir Kramnik (Russia)	2801	½	0	½		½	½	1	0	½	1	4½	5				2774
5	Alexander Morozevich (Russia)	2769	½	1	½	½		1	1	0	0	0	4½	4	3			2777
6	Levon Aronian (Armenia)	2825	½	1	½	½	0		½	0	1	½	4½	4	2	½	2	2771
7	Alexander Grischuk (Russia)	2761	½	½	½	0	0	½		1	1	½	4½	4	2	½	1½	2778
8	Luke McShane (England)	2706	0	0	0	1	1	1	0		½	½	4	5	3			2741
9	Hikaru Nakamura (United States)	2775	½	½	½	½	1	0	0	½		½	4	5	1			2734
10	Evgeny Tomashevsky (Russia)	2738	½	0	0	0	1	½	½	½	½		3½					2701

=== 2013 ===
The Tal Memorial 2013 took place from 13 to 24 June 2013, with participants Magnus Carlsen, Vladimir Kramnik, Viswanathan Anand, Hikaru Nakamura, Sergey Karjakin, Fabiano Caruana, Alexander Morozevich, Boris Gelfand, Shakhriyar Mamedyarov, and Dmitry Andreikin. As in 2011, seven of the world's top ten players participated. The Elo average for the tournament is 2777, making it a Category 22 event and one of the highest rated tournaments of all time. A blitz chess tournament on June 12 preceded the main event with a separate prize fund to determine the numbering of the players in the main tournament.

8th Tal Memorial Blitz, 12 June 2013, Moscow, Russia
	Player	Blitz rating	1	2	3	4	5	6	7	8	9	10	Points	Black	Wins	H2H
1	Hikaru Nakamura (United States)	2844		½	½	½	½	1	1	1	1	1	7			
2	Viswanathan Anand (India)	2786	½		½	½	½	1	1	1	1	½	6½			
3	Vladimir Kramnik (Russia)	2752	½	½		½	½	1	½	0	1	1	5½			
4	Boris Gelfand (Israel)	2694	½	½	½		½	1	0	1	½	0	4½	5		
5	Magnus Carlsen (Norway)	2856	½	½	½	½		½	0	1	0	1	4½	4		
6	Dmitry Andreikin (Russia)	2824	0	0	0	0	½		1	½	1	1	4	5	3	1
7	Shakhriyar Mamedyarov (Azerbaijan)	2777	0	0	½	1	1	0		½	0	1	4	5	3	0
8	Sergey Karjakin (Russia)	2873	0	0	1	0	0	½	½		½	1	3½			
9	Alexander Morozevich (Russia)	2756	0	0	0	½	1	0	1	½		0	3			
10	Fabiano Caruana (Italy)	2718	0	½	0	1	0	0	0	0	1		2½			

8th Tal Memorial, 13–23 June 2013, Moscow, Russia, Category XXII (2777)
	Player	Rating	1	2	3	4	5	6	7	8	9	10	Points	Black	Wins	TPR
1	Boris Gelfand (Israel)	2755		½	1	½	½	1	½	1	½	½	6			2905
2	Magnus Carlsen (Norway)	2864	½		0	½	½	1	½	½	1	1	5½			2848
3	Fabiano Caruana (Italy)	2774	0	1		½	½	0	½	1	1	½	5	5	3	2821
4	Shakhriyar Mamedyarov (Azerbaijan)	2753	½	½	½		½	1	½	½	½	½	5	5	1	2823
5	Dmitry Andreikin (Russia)	2713	½	½	½	½		½	½	½	½	1	5	4		2828
6	Hikaru Nakamura (United States)	2784	0	0	1	0	½		1	0	1	1	4½			2777
7	Sergey Karjakin (Russia)	2782	½	½	½	½	½	0		½	½	½	4			2734
8	Alexander Morozevich (Russia)	2760	0	½	0	½	½	1	½		0	½	3½	5		2699
9	Viswanathan Anand (India)	2786	½	0	0	½	½	0	½	1		½	3½	4		2696
10	Vladimir Kramnik (Russia)	2803	½	0	½	½	0	0	½	½	½		3			2650

=== 2014 ===
In 2014 the classical event was replaced by the TASHIR Petrosian Memorial, sponsored by Tashir Group, which took place from 3 to 11 November. This tournament was a category 20 event (average Elo rating of 2748) and it was won by Alexander Grischuk.

On 13 and 14 November the Tal Memorial Blitz tournament took place in Sochi, during the World Chess Championship 2014. It was a 12-player double round-robin event and it was won by Shakhriyar Mamedyarov.

9th Tal Memorial, Blitz chess, 13–14 November 2014, Sochi, Krasnodar Krai, Russia
	Player	Blitz rating	1	2	3	4	5	6	7	8	9	10	11	12	Points	H2H
1	Shakhriyar Mamedyarov (Azerbaijan)	2824		1 0	1 ½	1 1	½ 0	½ 0	1 0	1 1	1 1	1 ½	1 1	1 1	16	
2	Alexander Grischuk (Russia)	2724	0 1		1 ½	1 1	1 1	1 ½	1 ½	0 1	½ 0	½ ½	1 ½	1 1	15½	
3	Boris Gelfand (Israel)	2719	0 ½	0 ½		½ 1	0 1	0 0	½ ½	1 1	½ ½	1 1	1 0	1 1	12½	2½
4	Sergey Karjakin (Russia)	2701	0 0	0 0	½ 0		1 ½	½ 1	0 1	0 1	½ 1	1 1	½ 1	1 1	12½	2
5	Alexander Morozevich (Russia)	2811	½ 1	0 0	1 0	0 ½		½ 1	1 ½	1 0	0 ½	1 ½	1 ½	1 1	12½	1½
6	Peter Svidler (Russia)	2756	½ 1	0 ½	1 1	½ 0	½ 0		1 0	0 0	1 1	0 0	1 1	1 1	12	
7	Ian Nepomniachtchi (Russia)	2880	0 1	0 ½	½ ½	1 0	0 ½	0 1		0 1	1 ½	0 1	0 ½	1 1	11	
8	Vladimir Kramnik (Russia)	2757	0 0	1 0	0 0	1 0	0 1	1 1	1 0		½ ½	½ 1	0 1	0 1	10½	
9	Peter Leko (Hungary)	2682	0 0	½ 1	½ ½	½ 0	1 ½	0 0	0 ½	½ ½		½ ½	½ ½	1 1	10	
10	Ernesto Inarkiev (Russia)	2648	0 ½	½ ½	0 0	0 0	0 ½	1 1	1 0	½ 0	½ ½		0 1	1 1	9½	
11	Evgeny Tomashevsky (Russia)	2725	0 0	0 ½	0 1	½ 0	0 ½	0 0	1 ½	1 0	½ ½	1 0		1 0	8	
12	Alexandra Kosteniuk (Russia)	2548	0 0	0 0	0 0	0 0	0 0	0 0	0 0	1 0	0 0	0 0	0 1		2	

=== 2016 ===
10th Tal Memorial Blitz, 25 September 2016, Moscow, Russia
	Player	Blitz rating	1	2	3	4	5	6	7	8	9	10	Points	H2H
1	Shakhriyar Mamedyarov (Azerbaijan)	2748		1	1	½	½	1	1	1	1	½	7½	
2	Levon Aronian (Armenia)	2826	0		1	½	0	½	1	1	1	½	5½	
3	Ian Nepomniachtchi (Russia)	2840	0	0		½	1	½	1	1	½	½	5	1½
4	Peter Svidler (Russia)	2795	½	½	½		½	1	1	0	½	½	5	1
5	Anish Giri (Netherlands)	2766	½	1	0	½		0	½	1	½	1	5	½
6	Vladimir Kramnik (Russia)	2713	0	½	½	0	1		1	½	½	½	4½	
7	Boris Gelfand (Israel)	2765	0	0	0	0	½	0		1	1	1	3½	
8	Evgeny Tomashevsky (Russia)	2793	0	0	0	1	0	½	0		1	½	3	1½
9	Li Chao (China)	2624	0	0	½	½	½	½	0	0		1	3	1
10	Viswanathan Anand (India)	2790	½	½	½	½	0	½	0	½	0		3	½

10th Tal Memorial, 26 September – 6 October 2016, Moscow, Russia, Category XXI (2760)
	Player	Rating	1	2	3	4	5	6	7	8	9	10	Points	H2H	SB	TPR
1	Ian Nepomniachtchi (Russia)	2740		½	½	½	½	½	1	1	1	½	6			2887
2	Anish Giri (Netherlands)	2755	½		0	½	1	½	½	½	1	1	5½			2840
3	Levon Aronian (Armenia)	2795	½	1		½	½	½	½	½	½	½	5	½	22.75	2799
4	Viswanathan Anand (India)	2776	½	½	½		½	½	0	1	½	1	5	½	21.00	2801
5	Peter Svidler (Russia)	2745	½	0	½	½		1	½	½	½	½	4½		19.75	2761
6	Li Chao (China)	2746	½	½	½	½	0		½	½	½	1	4½		19.00	2761
7	Vladimir Kramnik (Russia)	2808	0	½	½	1	½	½		0	½	1	4½		18.50	2754
8	Shakhriyar Mamedyarov (Azerbaijan)	2761	0	½	½	0	½	½	1		½	1	4½		18.00	2759
9	Evgeny Tomashevsky (Russia)	2731	0	0	½	½	½	½	½	½		½	3½			2683
10	Boris Gelfand (Israel)	2743	½	0	½	0	½	0	0	0	½		2			2541

=== 2018 ===
11th Tal Memorial, Rapid chess, 2–4 March 2018, Moscow, Russia
	Player	Rapid rating	1	2	3	4	5	6	7	8	9	10	Points	H2H	SB
1	Viswanathan Anand (India)	2805		0	½	1	½	1	½	1	½	1	6		
2	Shakhriyar Mamedyarov (Azerbaijan)	2755	1		½	½	½	½	½	0	1	½	5	1½	22.75
3	Sergey Karjakin (Russia)	2724	½	½		½	½	½	1	½	½	½	5	1½	22.00
4	Hikaru Nakamura (United States)	2820	0	½	½		1	½	1	0	½	1	5	1½	21.00
5	Boris Gelfand (Israel)	2644	½	½	½	0		½	½	1	½	½	4½	½	19.75
6	Alexander Grischuk (Russia)	2792	0	½	½	½	½		1	½	½	½	4½	½	19.25
7	Vladimir Kramnik (Russia)	2795	½	½	0	0	½	0		1	1	½	4	1	
8	Daniil Dubov (Russia)	2663	0	1	½	1	0	½	0		½	½	4	0	
9	Peter Svidler (Russia)	2770	½	0	½	½	½	½	0	½		½	3½	½	16.25
10	Ian Nepomniachtchi (Russia)	2803	0	½	½	0	½	½	½	½	½		3½	½	15.25

11th Tal Memorial, Blitz chess, 5 March 2018, Moscow, Russia
	Player	Blitz rating	1	2	3	4	5	6	7	8	9	10	11	12	13	14	Points	H2H	SB
1	Sergey Karjakin (Russia)	2868		1	1	1	1	0	1	½	½	1	1	½	½	1	10		
2	Hikaru Nakamura (United States)	2842	0		1	½	1	1	½	1	½	½	½	½	½	1	8½		
3	Ian Nepomniachtchi (Russia)	2768	0	0		½	½	½	½	0	1	1	1	1	½	1	7½		
4	Vladislav Artemiev (Russia)	2834	0	½	½		1	1	0	1	0	1	1	0	½	½	7	2	
5	Alexander Grischuk (Russia)	2846	0	0	½	0		1	1	½	½	1	0	1	½	1	7	1	
6	Vladimir Kramnik (Russia)	2784	1	0	½	0	0		0	1	1	½	½	1	1	½	7	0	
7	Daniil Dubov (Russia)	2767	0	½	½	1	0	1		½	1	½	0	0	1	½	6½	½	41.25
8	Dmitry Andreikin (Russia)	2828	½	0	1	0	½	0	½		½	0	½	1	1	1	6½	½	38.75
9	Viswanathan Anand (India)	2801	½	½	0	1	½	0	0	½		½	1	0	1	½	6	½	38.00
10	Peter Svidler (Russia)	2793	0	½	0	0	0	½	½	1	½		1	1	0	1	6	½	34.50
11	Alexander Morozevich (Russia)	2663	0	½	0	0	1	½	1	½	0	0		1	½	0	5	1½	
12	Vladimir Fedoseev (Russia)	2688	½	½	0	1	0	0	1	0	1	0	0		1	0	5	1	
13	Shakhriyar Mamedyarov (Azerbaijan)	2714	½	½	½	½	½	0	0	0	0	1	½	0		1	5	½	
14	Boris Gelfand (Israel)	2745i	0	0	0	½	0	½	½	0	½	0	1	1	0		4		
