= Shakhriyar Mamedyarov =

Azerbaijani chess grandmaster (born 1985)

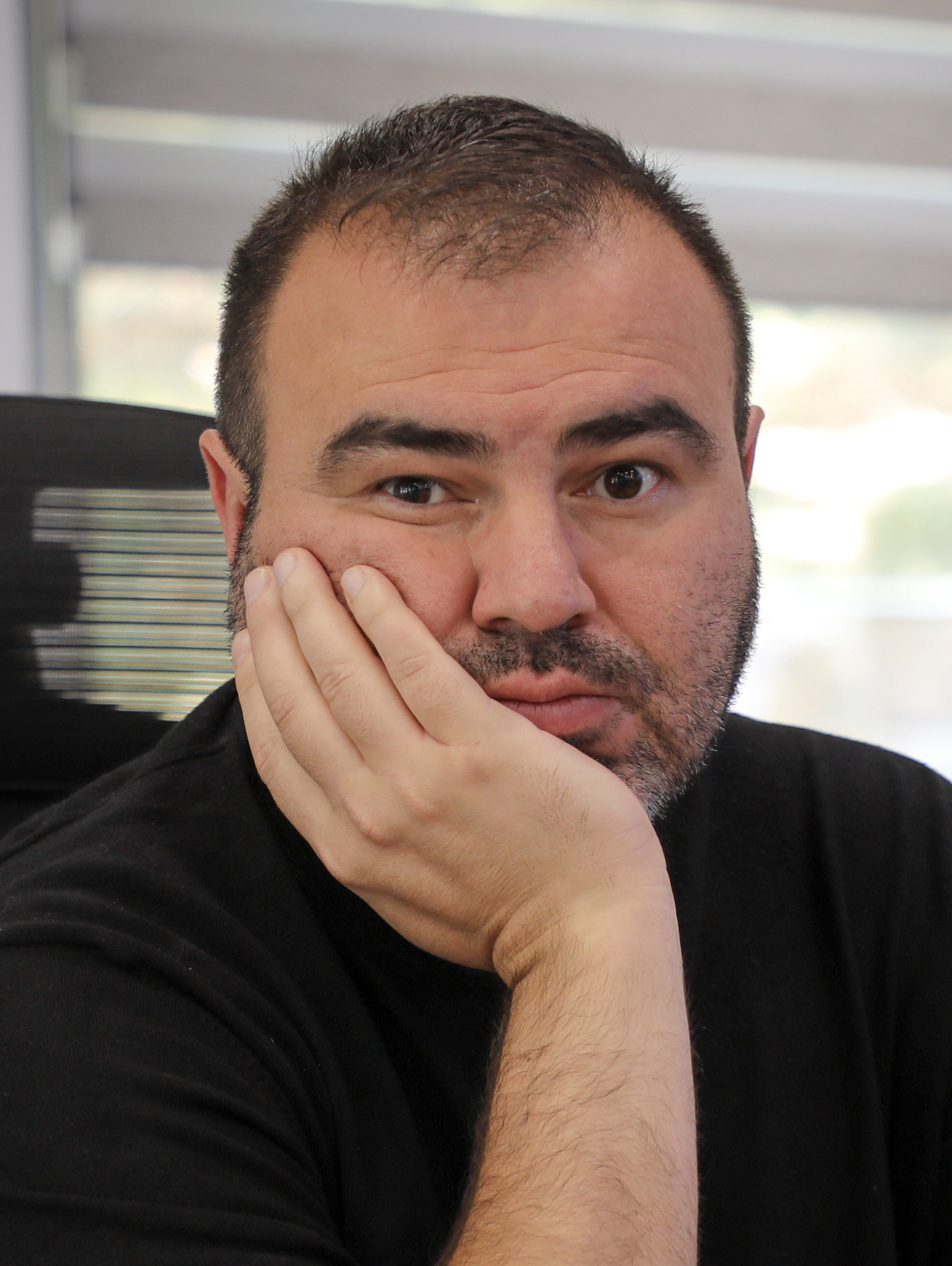
- Mamedyarov in 2026

Personal information
- Born: Şəhriyar Həmid oğlu Məmmədyarov; 12 April 1985 (age 41) Baku, Azerbaijan SSR, Soviet Union

Chess career
- Country: Azerbaijan
- Title: Grandmaster (2002)
- FIDE rating: 2709 (November 2026)
- Peak rating: 2820 (September 2018)
- Ranking: No. 27 (November 2026)
- Peak ranking: No. 2 (February 2018)

Shahriyar Hamid oglu Mammadyarov (Azerbaijani: Şəhriyar Həmid oğlu Məmmədyarov; born 12 April 1985), known internationally as Shakhriyar Mamedyarov (Note: Based on the translation of his name into Russian: Шахрияр Гамид оглы Мамедьяров, romanized: Shakhriyar Gamid ogly Mamed'yarov), is an Azerbaijani chess grandmaster. As of July 2025, he is Azerbaijan's highest rated chess player. His personal best rating of 2820 makes him the sixth-highest-rated player in chess history.

Mamedyarov has competed in the Candidates Tournament in 2011 (eliminated in quarterfinals), in 2014 (placing fourth) and in 2018 (placing second). He is a two-time World Junior Champion (2003 and 2005) and was World Rapid Champion in 2013.

A gold medalist at the 2012 Chess Olympiad on the third board, he is a three-time European Team Champion (2009, 2013, 2017) with Azerbaijan. He is also a two-time winner at Tal Memorial (2010 joint and 2014 Blitz) and Shamkir Chess (2016 and 2017), as well as the winner of 2018 Biel Chess Festival where he beat reigning World Champion Magnus Carlsen.

== Personal life ==
Shakhriyar's parents are from the Zangilan District of Azerbaijan. In 1980, his family moved to the then-flourishing industrial city of Sumqayit, Azerbaijan, where Shakhriyar was born. His first chess trainer was his father, who is also a former boxer and taught boxing to Shakhriyar for some time. Mamedyarov has two sisters, Zeinab Mamedyarova and Turkan Mamedyarova, who are Woman Grandmasters. Mamedyarov got married in 2012, but later divorced. He remarried in July 2017.

== Professional chess career ==
In 2003, Mamedyarov won the World Junior Chess Championship. He repeated his victory in 2005, becoming the only two-time champion, while achieving a 2953 performance rating after eight rounds. This performance earned him an invitation to the Essent Tournament 2006 in Hoogeveen. After winning this and the 2007 edition, Mamedyarov achieved world fame.

In 2005 Mamedyarov competed at the European Club Cup and had the second-highest performance rating (2913), after Vassily Ivanchuk, of all of the participants.

Mamedyarov attained joint first place at the Aeroflot Open in Moscow in February 2006, with a score of 6½/9. In May, he won the combined FiNet/Ordix rapid event. In October 2006, he won the closed Essent Chess Tournament in Hoogeveen with 4½/6, beating Judit Polgár on Sonneborn-Berger tie-breaks.

At the Chess World Cup 2007 Mamedyarov reached the third round where he was knocked out by Ivan Cheparinov.

In 2008, he won the Corsican Circuit rapid knockout.

In 2009, he won the Mainz Ordix Open with 10/11.

In 2010, he tied for first place with Vladimir Kramnik and Gata Kamsky at the President's Cup in Baku, followed by joint first in the Tal Memorial.

In June 2013, Mamedyarov won the World Rapid Chess Championship, scoring 11½/15. The next month he won the Geneva Masters rapid event.

In November 2014, he won the Tal Memorial for the second time.

In June 2016, Mamedyarov won the 3rd Shamkir Chess Tournament, the Vugar Gashimov Memorial. He defeated both top seeds Fabiano Caruana and Anish Giri in the last two rounds, which put him in a tiebreak situation with Caruana. He defeated Caruana in the tiebreak, thus giving him tournament victory.

In April 2017, Mamedyarov won the Vugar Gashimov Memorial for the second year in a row with a score of 5½/9.

In April 2018, he participated in the fifth edition of the Gashimov Memorial, finishing fourth with a score of 4½/9 (+1–1=7).

From 28 May to 7 June 2018, he competed in the sixth edition of Norway Chess, placing seventh with 3½/8 (+0–1=7).

From 22 July 2018 to 1 August, he competed in the 51st Biel Chess Festival, winning the event by one-and-a-half points ahead of Magnus Carlsen. He defeated Carlsen in round 9 with the white pieces of a King's Indian, Fianchetto Variation.

On 14 June 2020, Mamedyarov won Sharjah online Chess tournament with 7.5 points from 10 rounds which is his first online tournament win.

On 26 June 2020, Mamedyarov placed 2nd-6th in the 1st Mukhtar Ismagambetov Memorial along with Nodirbek Abdusattorov, Dmitriy Bocharov, Kazybek Nogerbek, and Davit Maghalashvili, with a score of 8.5/11.

In June 2021, Mamedyarov won Superbet Chess Classic tournament in which Fabiano Caruana, Levon Aronian, Alexander Grischuk, Maxime Vachier-Lagrave, Anish Giri, Teimour Radjabov and Wesley So participated.

Through February and March 2022, Mamedyarov played in the FIDE Grand Prix 2022. In the second leg, he placed second in Pool D with a 3/6 result. In the third leg, he won his pool with a result of 3.5/6 and a 3/4 result in rapid and blitz tiebreakers against Vincent Keymer.

=== World Championship cycles ===
In 2011, Mamedyarov was the tournament organisers' nominee, qualifying him for the Candidates Tournament for the World Chess Championship 2012, where he lost to Boris Gelfand in the first round.

In the 2014 cycle, he qualified for the Candidates Tournament by coming second in the FIDE Grand Prix 2012–13. He finished fourth in the Candidates, with a score of 7/14.

He failed to qualify for the 2016 Candidates. He came sixth in the FIDE Grand Prix 2014–15, and was knocked out in the quarter-finals of the Chess World Cup 2015 by eventual winner Sergey Karjakin.

In the 2018 cycle, he qualified for the Candidates Tournament 2018 by winning the FIDE Grand Prix 2017. He finished as a runner-up in Candidates one point behind Caruana, with a score of 8/14.

In the 2020 cycle, he failed to qualify for Candidates, finishing fourth in FIDE Grand Prix 2019, and being knocked out in the Fourth round of Chess World Cup 2019, by Teimour Radjabov.

In the 2022 cycle, he failed to qualify for Candidates, finishing seventh in FIDE Grand Prix 2022, and being knocked out in the Third round of Chess World Cup 2021, by Haik Martirosyan.

== Team competitions ==
Mamedyarov played for Azerbaijan at the Chess Olympiads of 2000, 2002, 2004, 2008, 2010, 2012, 2014, 2016 and 2018. In 2009, 2013 and 2017 he won the team gold medal for Azerbaijan at the European Team Chess Championship, having won the bronze medal in 2007 and silver in 2011.

== Tournament victories ==
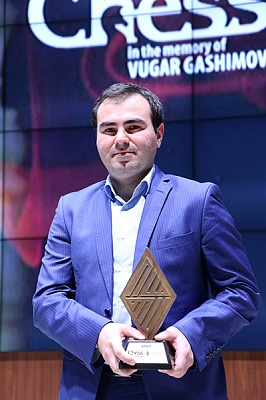
Mamedyarov at the closing ceremony of the 2016 Shamkir Chess tournament.

Tournament victories by Mamedyarov include:

- 2022 ShushaChess, 1st
- 2021 Superbet Chess Classic, 1st
- 2018 Biel Chess Festival, 1st
- 2017 FIDE Grand Prix, 1st
- 2017 Gashimov Memorial (4th annual Shamkir Chess tournament)
- 2016 Gashimov Memorial (3rd annual Shamkir Chess tournament)
- 2014 Tal Memorial (Blitz), 1st
- 2013 Beijing FIDE Grand Prix 2012–2013, 1st
- 2013 Geneva Chess Masters, Rapid (knock-out format), 1st
- 2013 World Rapid Chess Championship Khanty-Mansiysk, 1st
- 2010 Tal Memorial, joint 1st
- 2010 The President's Cup, joint 1st
- 2009 Chess Classic, Mainz, 1st
- 2008 Rapid Tournament, Corsica, 1st
- 2007 Rapid Tournament, Czech Republic, 1st
- 2006 Hoogeveen Essent Tournament, 1st
- 2006 Ordix Open, joint 1st
- 2006 Aeroflot Open, Moscow, Russia, joint 1st
- 2006 Reykjavík Open, joint 1st
- 2006 The President's Cup, Baku, Azerbaijan 1st
- 2005 World Junior Championship (Under-20)
- 2004 Dubai Open, Dubai, 1st
- 2003 Under-18 World Championship
- 2003 World Junior Championship (Under-20), Nakhchivan, Azerbaijan

== Coaching ==
Mamedyarov is the coach of Turkish chess prodigy Yağız Kaan Erdoğmuş.

== Notes ==
Achievements
| Preceded by Sergey Karjakin | World Rapid Chess Champion; 2013 | Succeeded by Magnus Carlsen |
