= Sergey Karjakin =

Russian chess grandmaster and politician (born 1990)

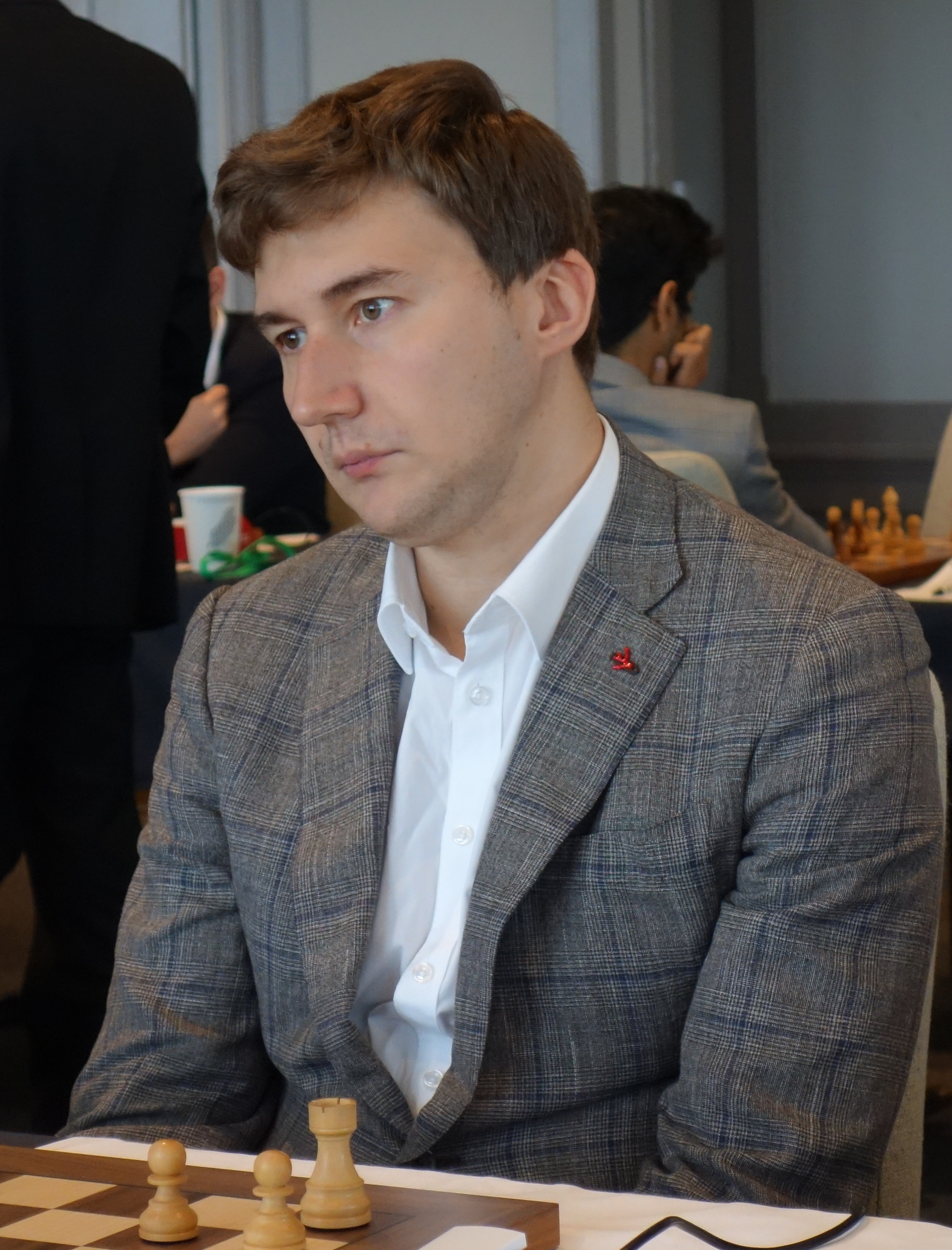
- Karjakin in 2019

Personal information
- Born: Sergey Alexandrovich Karjakin; 12 January 1990 (age 36) Simferopol, Crimean Oblast, Soviet Union
- Spouses: Kateryna Dolzhykova (m. 2009, divorced) Galiya Kamalova (m. 2014)

Chess career
- Country: Ukraine (until 2009); Russia (since 2009)
- Title: Grandmaster (2003)
- FIDE rating: 2750 (November 2026)
- Peak rating: 2788 (July 2011)
- Peak ranking: No. 4 (July 2011)

Member of the Federation Council for Crimea
- Incumbent
- Assumed office 12 September 2024

Personal details
- Party: United Russia

Sergey Alexandrovich Karjakin (Note: Russian: Серге́й Алекса́ндрович Каря́кин, IPA: [sʲɪrˈɡʲej ɐlʲɪkˈsandrəvʲɪtɕ kɐˈrʲækʲɪn].) (born 12 January 1990) is a Russian chess grandmaster and politician. A chess prodigy, he previously held the record for the world's youngest ever grandmaster, having qualified for the title at the age of 12 years and 7 months. On 12 September 2024, he became a senator for Crimea in the Federation Council of Russia.

Karjakin won the European U10 Chess Championship in 1999 and was the World U12 Chess Champion in 2001. He earned the International Master title at age 11 and was awarded his Grandmaster title in 2003. He represented Ukraine at the Chess Olympiad in 2004, winning team and individual gold. He competed in two more Chess Olympiads for Ukraine and won the Corus chess tournament in 2009, before transferring to Russia. He has since represented Russia five times in the Chess Olympiad, winning individual gold in 2010. He also won team gold with Russia at the World Team Chess Championship in 2013 and 2019.

Karjakin won the 2012 World Rapid Chess Championship and the Norway Chess tournament in 2013 and 2014. He competed at the Candidates Tournament 2014, placing second. He won the Chess World Cup 2015, thus qualifying for the Candidates Tournament 2016. He won the Candidates and earned the right to challenge for the World Chess Championship. In November 2016, he lost the championship match to Magnus Carlsen in the rapid tiebreaks after drawing 6–6 in the classical games. He won the 2016 World Blitz Chess Championship. He participated in the Candidates Tournament 2018, placing third, and qualified for the Candidates Tournament 2022 by finishing second in the Chess World Cup 2021.

Karjakin's public approval of the Russian invasion of Ukraine prompted the Grand Chess Tour to ban him in future events. He was also banned from playing FIDE-rated events for six months, including the Candidates Tournament 2022. Following the expiration of his ban, Karjakin has refused to participate in events where he is barred from playing under the Russian flag; this, in conjunction with FIDE's ban on Belarusian and Russian flags, meant that Karjakin has been inactive, dropping out of FIDE's rating lists in June 2024.

== Prodigy ==
Karjakin learned to play chess when he was five years old. He joined the A.V. Momot Club in Kramatorsk, Ukraine, and was coached by Vladislav Borovikov, becoming an International Master at age 11 years and 11 months. He won the U10 European championship in 1999 and the U12 world championship in 2001. Also in 2001, Karjakin tied for first place in the U14 European championship with Borki Predojević and Rauf Mamedov, taking the silver medal on tiebreak. In January 2002, he was the official second of fellow Ukrainian Ruslan Ponomariov during the final of the FIDE World Championship, though Karjakin had only just turned 12 at the time.

By scoring grandmaster norms at the Aeroflot Open in Moscow, Alushta tournament in May 2002 and Sudak in August 2002, Karjakin surpassed Bu Xiangzhi to become the world's youngest grandmaster at the age of 12 years 7 months―a record that lasted for 19 years until 2021, when American player Abhimanyu Mishra achieved the qualifications for the title at the age of 12 years, 4 months, and 25 days. Both Karjakin and Mishra faced scrutiny for the methods with which they won their qualification, however; Karjakin's father was accused of using methods skirting the norms of chess in enabling such an early attainment of the title.

In 2003, Karjakin won a six-game match against Alexandra Kosteniuk ("Dannemann Classico") in Brissago by a score of 4–2 and tied for second in the Ukrainian Chess Championship.

Karjakin competed in the 2004 FIDE World Championship in Tripoli, where he lost in the first round to Mikhail Kobalia. Soon after, Karjakin took part in the Dortmund Sparkassen Chess Meeting. Here he defeated the reigning world champion, Vladimir Kramnik, in a blitz game. In October, Karjakin was the only human to win against a computer in the Man vs Machine World Team Championship in Bilbao, Spain, where he was the youngest and lowest-rated player, beating Deep Junior. At the 36th Chess Olympiad in Calvià, he was the youngest member of the gold-medal-winning Ukrainian team. He also won an individual gold medal thanks to his score of 6½/7 points playing the second reserve board. In December 2004, Karjakin finished second, behind Boris Gelfand at the Pamplona tournament. In the following month, he won the Group B of the Corus Chess Tournament in Wijk aan Zee, thus qualifying for the 2006 Group A.

Karjakin entered the world's top 100 in the April 2005 FIDE list, at 64th with an Elo rating of 2635. He scored 8½/11 points (+7–1=3) to win the Young Stars of the World tournament held in Kirishi, Russia in May. In July, he tied for third place in the European Individual Championship.

== Career ==
=== 2006 ===
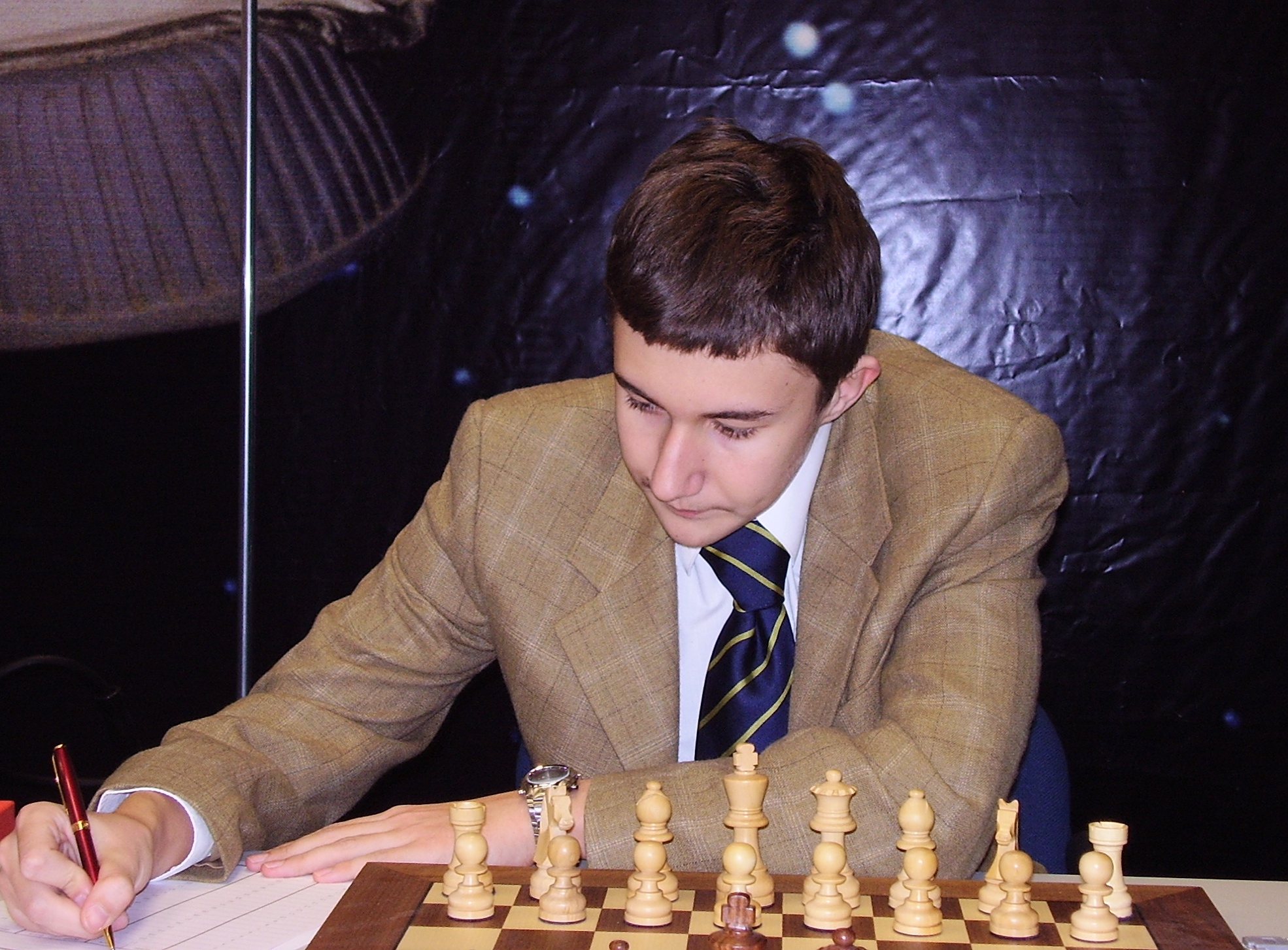
Karjakin at the Corus Tournament in 2006

In 2006, Karjakin played for the first time in the Wijk aan Zee Corus A tournament, scoring 7/13 points (4 wins, 6 draws, 3 losses). In the same year, he took part in the NH Chess Tournament in Amsterdam; it was a match between two teams, "Rising Stars" (made up of Karjakin, Magnus Carlsen, Wang Hao, Daniel Stellwagen, and Jan Smeets) and "Experience" (Alexander Beliavsky, Artur Yusupov, John Nunn, and Ulf Andersson), held with the Scheveningen system. The former won by 28–22.

=== 2007 ===
Karjakin played again in the NH Chess Tournament for team "Rising Stars", which beat "Experience" by 26½–23½. He was the best player, having scored 7/10, and this earned him an invitation for the 2008 Amber chess tournament. In October 2007, Karjakin finished second behind Bu Xiangzhi in the blindfold chess World Cup in Bilbao, scoring 17 points after five wins, two draws and three losses (the scoring system was 3 points for a win, 1 for a draw and 0 for a loss).

During the Chess World Cup 2007, which served as a qualification tournament for the World Chess Championship 2010, Karjakin reached the semi-finals, in which he lost to Alexei Shirov. On the January 2008 FIDE rating list, published just before Karjakin's 18th birthday, he passed the 2700 mark for the first time, often seen as the line that separates "elite" players from other grandmasters, with a new rating of 2732 and a world rank of 13.

=== 2008–2010 ===
In July 2008, Karjakin convincingly won a rapid chess match against GM Nigel Short 7½–2½.

In February 2009, he won his first elite tournament in the A group of the Corus chess tournament in Wijk aan Zee (category XIX), with a score of 8/13.

He won the ACP World Rapid Cup, which was conducted from 27 to 29 May 2010, defeating Dmitry Jakovenko in the final by 4–3.

=== 2011 ===
In June 2011, Karjakin took second place in the Bazna Kings Tournament in Mediaș, Romania, after sharing the lead with Magnus Carlsen in the final round, and after ranking was then determined by the tournament's official tie-break regulations. The final standings listed Carlsen followed by Karjakin, then Hikaru Nakamura, Teimour Radjabov, Vassily Ivanchuk, and Liviu-Dieter Nisipeanu. The results affected the world rankings, as Carlsen reclaimed first place, and Karjakin passed Kramnik for fourth place.

In November, Karjakin shared third place with Vassily Ivanchuk and Ian Nepomniachtchi in the category 22 Tal Memorial in Moscow.

=== 2012: World Rapid Champion ===
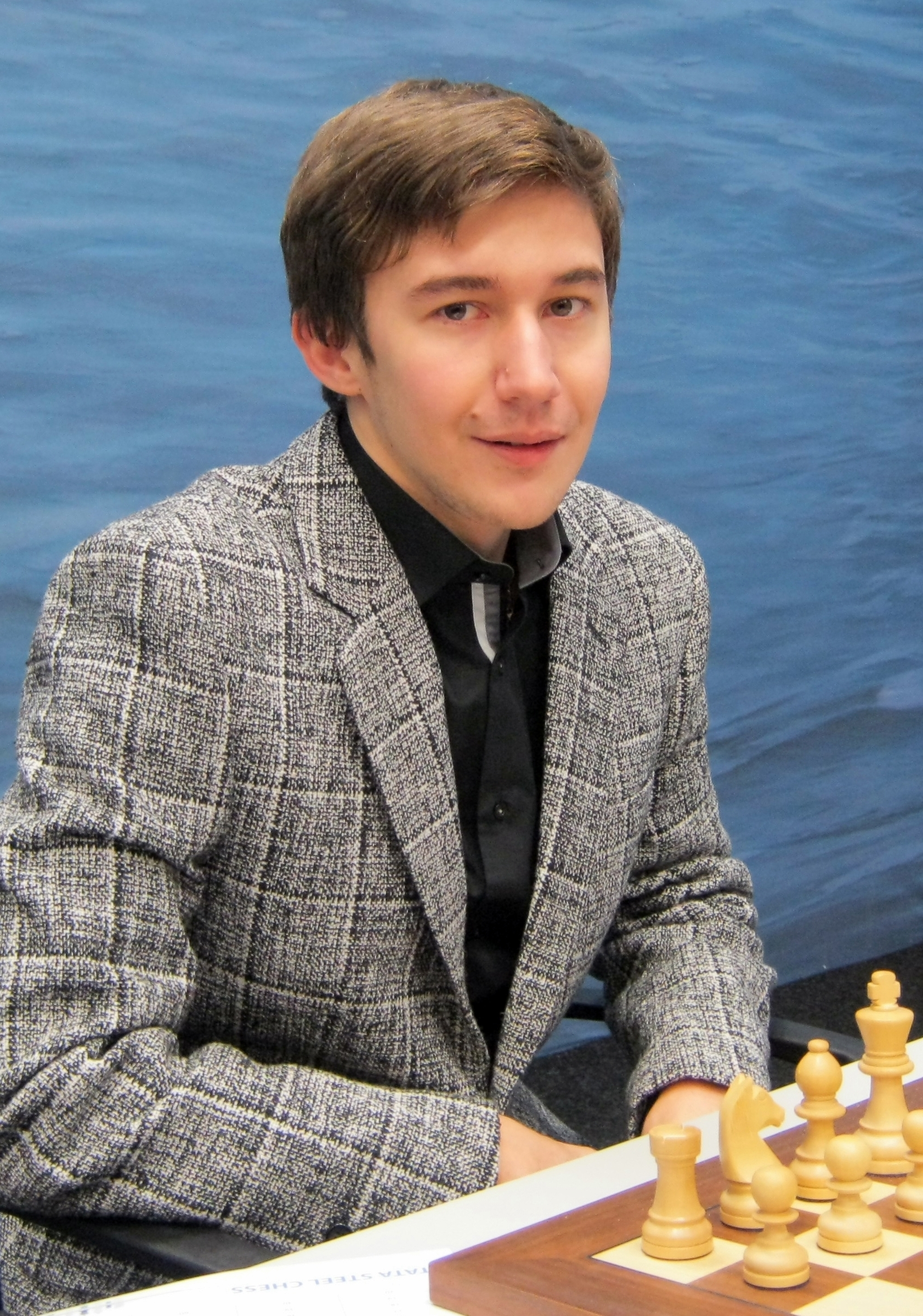
Karjakin in 2012

In July 2012, Karjakin won the World Rapid Chess Championship, a full point ahead of world number one Magnus Carlsen in Astana, Kazakhstan. In the same month, he also tied for first at Dortmund with Fabiano Caruana but came in second after tiebreak. In November–December 2012, Karjakin shared first place with Wang Hao and Alexander Morozevich with 6½/9 in the FIDE Grand Prix event held in Tashkent, Uzbekistan.

=== 2013–2014 ===
In May, he won the inaugural edition of Norway Chess, scoring 6½/9 (+6−2=1), half a point ahead of Carlsen.

In March 2014, he finished second place in the FIDE Candidates Tournament held in Khanty-Mansiysk, Russia, behind Viswanathan Anand. His second at the event was former FIDE World Champion Rustam Kasimdzhanov.

In June 2014, Karjakin won the Norway Chess tournament for the second year running. In this tournament, he competed against nine other players, six of which were rated in the FIDE top 10.

=== 2015 ===
Karjakin won the Chess World Cup 2015 after going down 0–2 to former World Cup Champion Peter Svidler, eventually winning 6–4 in blitz tiebreaks. By finishing in the top two, Karjakin qualified, along with Svidler, for the 2016 Candidates Tournament.

In the same year, he took part in the Russia–China Challenge Match. The first part of the event took place from 29 July to 1 August in the Heixiazi Island, where Karjakin sequentially knocked out four of the five members in the Chinese team: Wei Yi, Ding Liren, Ni Hua and Yu Yangyi. In the second half of the event, which was held in Harbin in December, he also defeated Wang Yue, leading team Russia to victory.

=== 2016: Candidates winner and World Blitz Champion ===
In March 2016, Karjakin won the 2016 Candidates Tournament in Moscow and qualified to play a match against Magnus Carlsen for the title of World Chess Champion. He defeated Fabiano Caruana in the last round of the tournament to finish with 8½ out of 14, one point ahead of Caruana and Anand.

The World Chess Championship 2016 took place 11–30 November 2016 in New York City. The format consisted of a maximum of 12 games played under a long classical time control, ending with possible speed chess tiebreak games and an Armageddon game to ensure a winner. Karjakin's record against Carlsen in classical games before the World Championship was: 1 win, 4 losses, and 16 draws. Karjakin won the eighth game, but lost the tenth, leaving the match tied 6–6. Carlsen defeated Karjakin 3–1 in the rapid tiebreaks and won the match. This remains the last time Carlsen was defeated in a classical or rapid game in the finals of a World Chess Championship having gone unbeaten in the rapid tiebreaks with Karjakin and in his subsequent matches with Caruana in 2018 (both in the classical portion and in the rapid tiebreaks) and Nepomniachtchi in 2021.

Karjakin won the 2016 World Blitz Chess Championship, which took place on 29 and 30 December 2016. Before the last round, Carlsen was leading with 16.0/20, while Karjakin was half a point behind. In the last round, Carlsen drew with Peter Leko, while Karjakin won against Baadur Jobava. Thus, they both finished the tournament with 16½/21. The tie-break (the Elo average of the opponents) was used to decide the winner, and as Karjakin's opponents had the better average, Karjakin was crowned 2016 World Blitz Champion. The extent of Karjakin's and Carlsen's domination in the event was shown by the fact that their closest rivals, Daniil Dubov, Hikaru Nakamura and Alexander Grischuk (three-time world blitz champion), were a full two points behind.

=== 2017–2018 ===
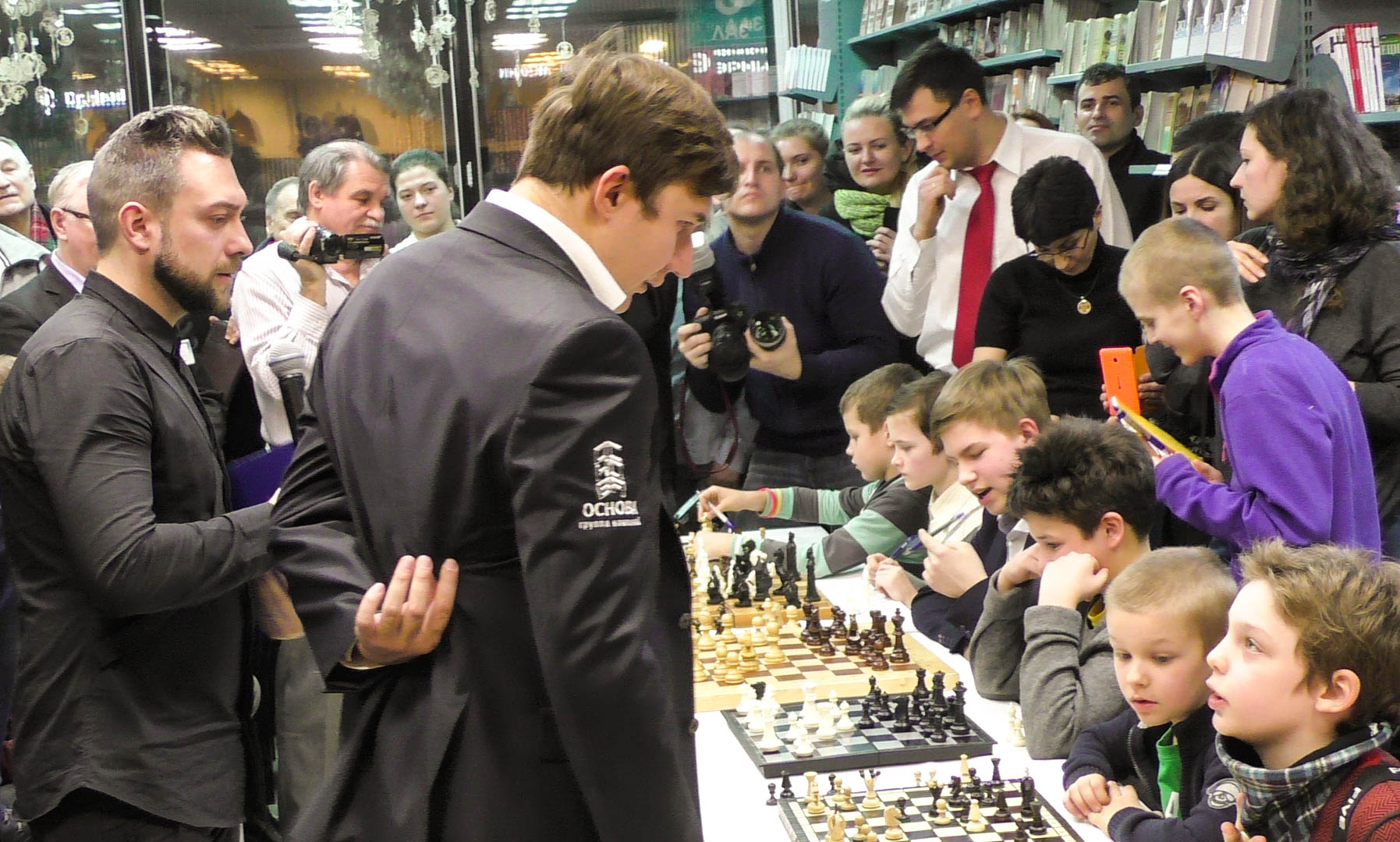
Karjakin in Moscow in 2017

In December, he participated in the London Chess Classic, placing eighth with a score of 3½/9.

In January, Karjakin competed in the Tata Steel Masters. He placed seventh, scoring 7½/13 (+2−0=11).

In March, he competed in the Candidates Tournament 2018. He finished third with 8/14 (+4−2=8), one point behind the winner Caruana.

In April, he participated in the fifth edition of Shamkir Chess, finishing third with a score of 5/9 (+1−0=8).

From 28 May to 7 June, he competed in the sixth edition of Norway Chess, finishing last with 3/8 (+1−3=4).

=== 2019–2020 ===
In March 2019, Karjakin competed as part of the Russian team at the World Team Championship in Astana, Kazakhstan. He was defeated by the Kazakh grandmaster Rinat Dzhumabaev. Despite this, the Russian team took first place in the tournament.

From 31 March to 9 April, he competed in Shamkir Chess 2019. He placed in a tie for second, with 5 points out of 9.

From 5 to 16 December 2020, Karjakin competed in the 73rd Russian Chess Championship. He finished with a score of 7/11, which earned him second place behind winner Ian Nepomniachtchi.

=== 2021 ===
In July–August 2021, Karjakin competed in the Chess World Cup 2021. In round five, Karjakin defeated French GM Maxime Vachier-Lagrave in the rapid tiebreaker after drawing the classical games. He then knocked out US GM Sam Shankland in the quarterfinals and eliminated Russian GM Vladimir Fedoseev in the semifinals to qualify for the Candidates Tournament 2022. Eventually, Karjakin lost to Polish GM Jan-Krzysztof Duda in the finals to finish second.

Karjakin criticised Daniil Dubov for serving as a second for Magnus Carlsen in the World Chess Championship 2021 against Ian Nepomniachtchi. This was also criticised by Sergei Shipov, who along with Karjakin said that Dubov should not have helped a non-Russian in a match against a fellow Russian. Dubov responded that he considered it to be a match between two individuals and counter-argued that working with Carlsen would improve his chess and hence help the Russian team.

From 26–28 December 2021, Karjakin participated in the 2021 FIDE World Rapid Championship, where he ended up in 11th place with 9/13 points after tiebreaks.

=== 2022–present ===
In January 2022, he competed in the Tata Steel Chess Tournament 2022, where he finished tied for fifth with a score of 7/13. Controversy arose among spectators after the tenth round when Karjakin and Carlsen drew by three-fold repetition after 16 moves in 20 minutes, with Karjakin's deciding to enter a drawn line of the Berlin Defence. After the game, Karjakin tweeted "#drawmagnus #saynoto2900".

==== Suspension ====
In February 2022, the Crimea-born Karjakin, who had transferred from the Ukrainian Chess Federation to the Russian Chess Federation in 2009, came out in vocal support of the Russian invasion of Ukraine. This led FIDE to refer him (as well as fellow Grandmaster Sergei Shipov) to the Ethics and Disciplinary Commission. While the investigation was ongoing, several chess tournaments and platforms banned Karjakin: the Grand Chess Tour did so in early March, saying "the GCT Board has determined that Grandmaster Sergey Karjakin is banned from all upcoming and future GCT events due to his recent hostile comments on social media supporting Russian President Vladimir Putin and the Russian invasion of Ukraine", while Chess.com banned him from participating in all prize tournaments that same month.

In March 2022, the FIDE Ethics and Disciplinary Commission banned him from playing any FIDE-rated events for six months. The Russian Chess Federation filed an appeal, which was denied. The decision meant that Karjakin was not able to participate in the Candidates Tournament 2022. In a post to his Telegram channel, Karjakin denounced FIDE for conflating sports with politics. He further declared that he considers himself a patriot first and a chess player second, and that he did not regret anything. His public approval of the invasion led to Russian President Vladimir Putin awarding him a Medal of the Order "For Merit to the Fatherland" in June 2022.

After the suspension ended in September 2022, Karjakin continued a self-imposed "ban" by refusing to participate in any tournament where he could not play under the Russian flag. (Note: FIDE had instituted a ban on Russian and Belarusian flags in all FIDE-rated events in response to the Russian invasion of Ukraine.) Notably, Karjakin opted out of playing at the 2023 Chess World Cup despite his eligibility to play at the event due to rating, reiterating his disapproval for "the upcoming tournament [where] I can't represent my country, play under my (country's) flag, and if I successfully perform, I will not hear my country's national anthem."

Since January 2022, Karjakin has (as of November 2024) only played two classical FIDE-rated games, at the Russian Team Championship in May 2023.

== Playing style ==
Karjakin is known for his defensive skills, which has earned him an informal nickname as Russia's "Minister of Defense". He successfully defended inferior positions against World Champion Magnus Carlsen – himself known for grinding out wins from slightly superior positions – in the World Chess Championship 2016, especially games 3 and 4. Karjakin has no qualms about entering an endgame with a small disadvantage if he deems it his best option as opposed to playing for complications. He is, however, also capable of aggressive play if the position demands it, such as in a 30-move victory over Veselin Topalov at the Gashimov Memorial 2017.

== Personal life ==
Karjakin is an ethnic Russian. On 25 July 2009, by the decree of the President of Russia Dmitry Medvedev, Karjakin adopted Russian citizenship. Later that year he transferred chess federations from Ukraine to Russia. He has lived in Moscow since 2009.

In 2013 he graduated from the Russian State Social University with a degree in social pedagogy.

Karjakin, an Eastern Orthodox Christian, married Galiya Kamalova, secretary of the Moscow chess federation, in May 2014. They have two sons, one born in 2015 and the other born in 2017. He was previously married since 2009 to Ukrainian chess player Kateryna Dolzhykova.

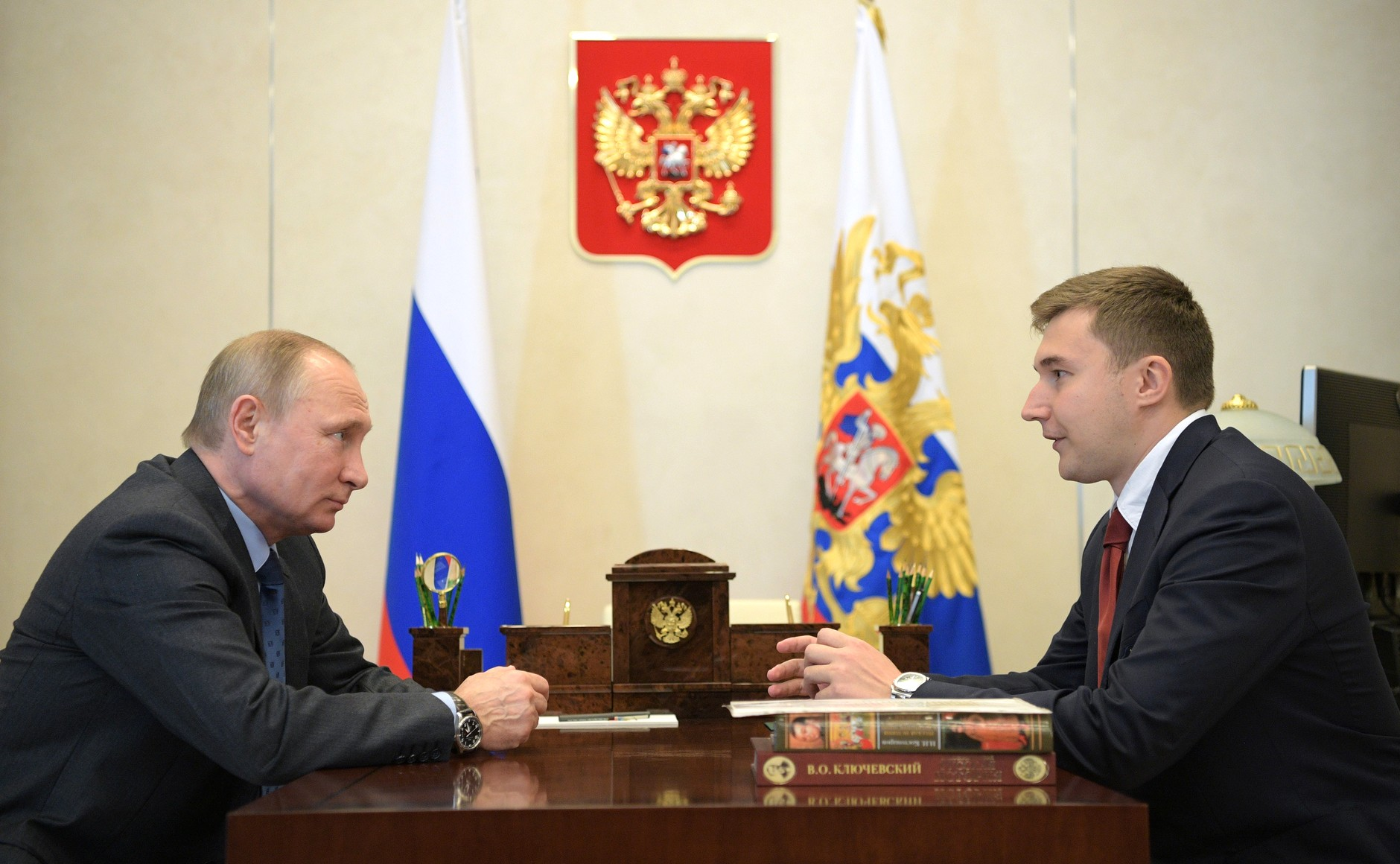
Karjakin (right) with Vladimir Putin in 2017

In January 2024, Karjakin was involved in a very serious motor vehicle accident, being the passenger of a car that flipped multiple times and suffering rib fractures. However, his injuries were not life-threatening. Later that year, in February 2024, Karjakin visited the ruins of the Ukrainian town Avdiivka, which had recently been occupied by Russian forces. He took selfies there in military gear.

== Political views ==
Karjakin is known for his strong support for Vladimir Putin. In 2022, he publicly endorsed the Russian invasion of Ukraine.

== Sanctions ==
In 2022, Karjakin was sanctioned by Ukraine for his public endorsement and approval of the Russian invasion of Ukraine. Karjakin was stripped of his Ukrainian state awards on 19 January 2025 by a decree of Ukrainian President Volodymyr Zelenskyy.

== Notes ==
Achievements
Preceded by Bu Xiangzhi	Youngest chess grandmaster ever 2002–2021	Succeeded by Abhimanyu Mishra
Preceded by Gata Kamsky	World Rapid Chess Champion; 2012	Succeeded by Shakhriyar Mamedyarov
Preceded by Alexander Grischuk	World Blitz Chess Champion; 2016	Succeeded by Magnus Carlsen
