= Rauf Mamedov =

Azerbaijani chess grandmaster (born 1988)

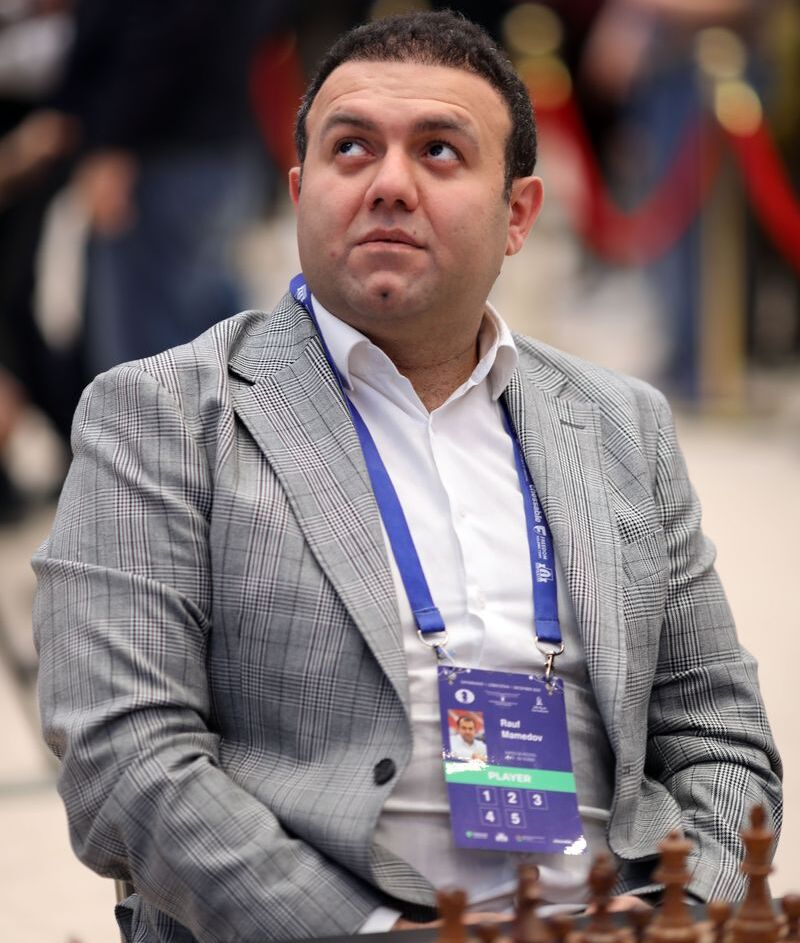
- Mamedov in 2023

Personal information
- Born: 26 April 1988 (age 38) Baku, Azerbaijan SSR, Soviet Union
- Spouse: Nataliya Buksa

Chess career
- Country: Azerbaijan
- Title: Grandmaster (2004)
- FIDE rating: 2639 (July 2026)
- Peak rating: 2709 (December 2017)
- Ranking: No. 84 (July 2026)
- Peak ranking: No. 33 (May 2018)

Rauf Mamedov (Azerbaijani: Rauf Məmmədov; born 26 April 1988) is an Azerbaijani chess grandmaster and a six-time national champion. He competed in the FIDE World Cup in 2007, 2009, 2011, 2015, 2023 and 2025.

== Early life ==
Born in Baku, Mamedov started playing chess at the age of seven.

== Career ==
In 2004, he won the Under-14 section of the European Youth Chess Championships. In the same year, he became a Grandmaster (GM), following his victory in the Dubai Open. Mamedov won the Azerbaijani championship in 2003, 2004, 2006, 2008, 2015, and 2025. He competed in the FIDE World Cup in 2007, 2009, 2011, 2015, 2023 and 2025.

In 2009, he tied for 1st-3rd with Yuriy Kuzubov and Dmitry Andreikin in the category 16 SPICE Cup tournament at Lubbock, Texas. Mamedov won the Corsica Masters blitz tournament in 2011. In 2015 Mamedov won the European Blitz Chess Championship in Minsk. In 2016, he won the men's blitz chess event of the IMSA Elite Mind Games in Huai'an, China.

In 2013, Mamedov won the U.S. Masters Chess Championship.

In February 2018, he participated in the Aeroflot Open. He finished tenth out of ninety-two, scoring 6/9 (+5–2=2).

In April 2018, he participated in the fifth edition of Shamkir Chess, finishing ninth with a score of 4/9 (+0–1=8).

=== Team competitions ===
He played in the gold medal-winning Azerbaijani team at the European Team Chess Championship in 2009, 2013 and 2017. He produced the best board 4 performances of the tournament in 2017, scoring 8/9 for a 2920 performance rating.

== Personal life ==
Rauf Mamedov is married to Ukrainian international master Nataliya Buksa.

== Gallery ==
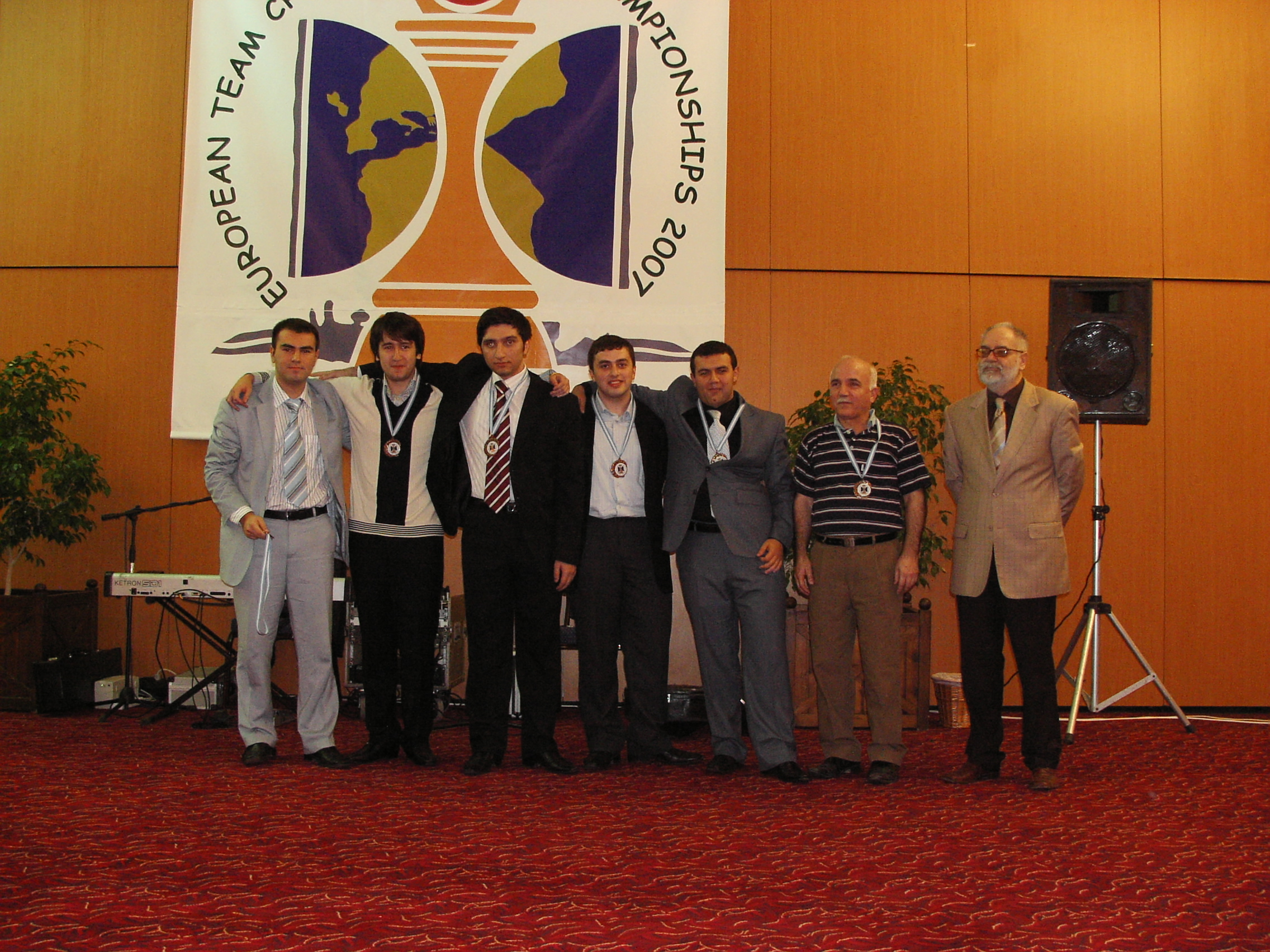
Mamedov with Azerbaijani Chess team, winners of European Team Chess Championship in 2007

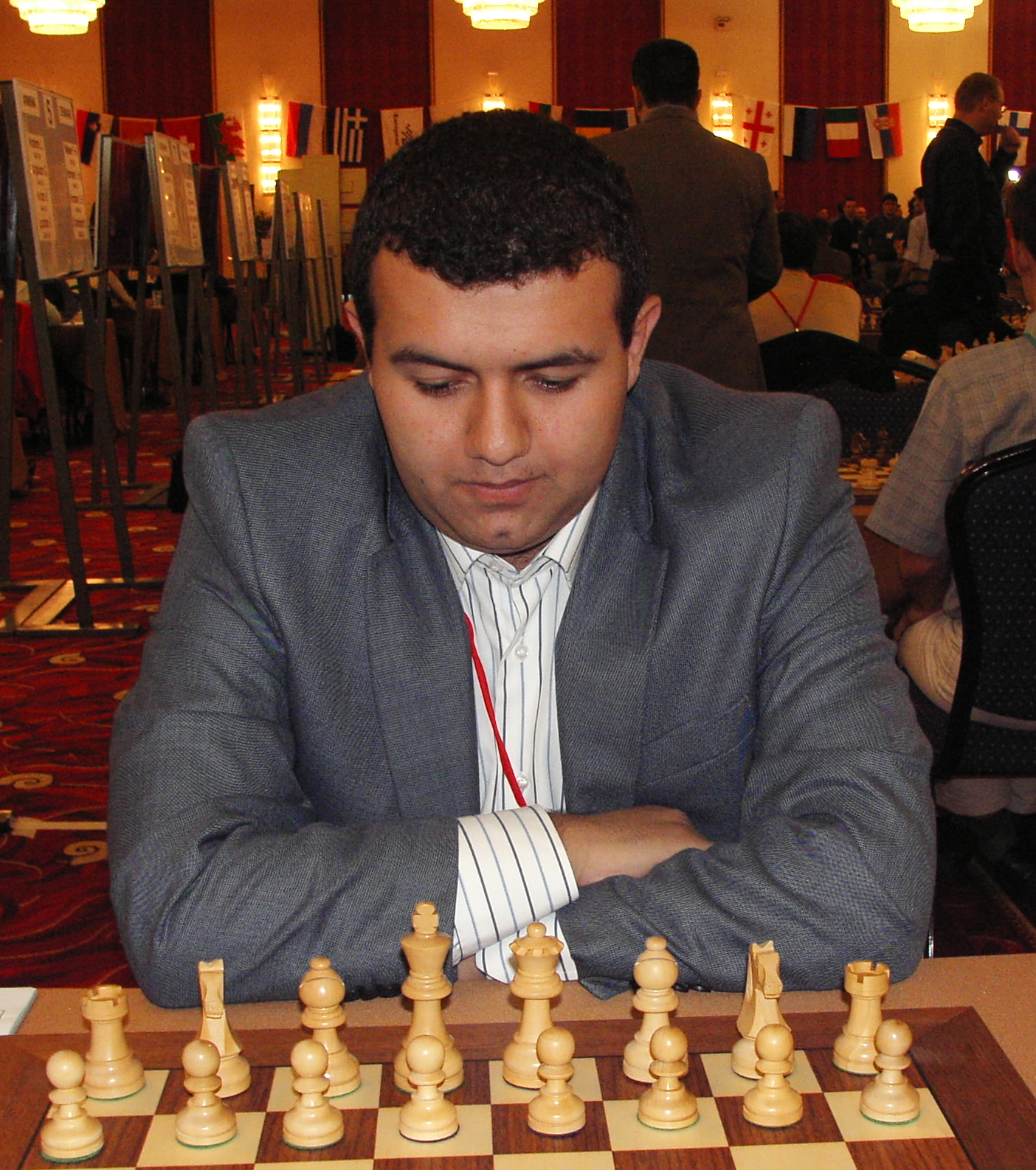
Mamedov at EuroChess 2007
