= Chirilovca =

Chirilovca may refer to several places in Moldova:

- Chirilovca, a village in Halahora de Sus Commune, Briceni District
- Chirilovca, a village in Alexeevca, Floreşti
- Chirilovca, a village in Vinogradovca Commune, Taraclia District

== See also ==
- Chiril (disambiguation)
- Chiril River (disambiguation)
- Chirileni, a village in Ungheni District, Moldova

Surnames:

- Chirilă — search for "Chirilă"
- Chirilov — search for "Chirilov"
