= Chiril =

Chiril may refer to:

- Chiril (name), a male given name
- Chiril, a village in Crucea Commune, Suceava County, Romania
- Chiril River (disambiguation), several rivers in Romania

== See also ==
- Chirilov, a surname
- Chirilovca (disambiguation)
