= FIDE Grand Prix =

Chess tournament series

The FIDE Grand Prix was a biennial series of chess tournaments, organized by FIDE and its commercial partner Agon. Each series consisted of three to six chess tournaments, which used to form part of the qualification cycle for the World Chess Championship. The top two finishers of the Grand Prix qualified to the Candidates Tournament.

== History ==
The Grand Prix was first played in 2008. The initial Grand Prix saw Magnus Carlsen withdraw (along with Michael Adams) due to changed incentives toward the World Chess Championship, (see FIDE Grand Prix 2008–2010 for details).

The first two editions consisted of six tournaments, but the 2014–15 edition only had four. Often, there were problems finding sponsors and many announced host cities were changed eventually. The 2014–15 edition was announced late, with only 4 events instead of 6, reduced prizes per event to about 1/3 of the previous amounts, and had no money for overall placings (as in the earlier editions). In 2014–15, five original invitees (Magnus Carlsen, Viswanathan Anand, Levon Aronian, Vladimir Kramnik and Veselin Topalov) didn't participate, with the small prize funds and organizational uncertainty being the reasons given.

The format was changed for the FIDE Grand Prix 2017 with 24 players taking part in the cycle. Four events took place with 18 players competing in each nine-round Swiss tournament. The events were originally announced to take place on 12–23 October, 2016; 10–21 February, 2017; 11–22 May, 2017; and 5–16 July, 2017. On 26 May, 2016, Agon CEO Ilya Merenzon hoped to announce the venues within the next two weeks. After the FIDE meetings at the 42nd Chess Olympiad in Baku in early September 2016, Peter Doggers of Chess.com reported that the Grand Prix had been postponed until 2017. Shakhriyar Mamedyarov and Alexander Grischuk qualified to the 2018 Candidates Tournament.

In 2019, the format was changed by FIDE once again, making the Grand Prix a knock-out series with 21 players taking part in the Series and 16 players in each event. 20 players qualified by rating and 2 were wild cards invited by organizers. The cities were Moscow, Riga, Hamburg and Jerusalem. The Series was organized by World Chess (formerly Agon) and was broadcast on worldchess.com and via media partners.

The 2022 Grand Prix took place in Berlin, Belgrade, then Berlin again.

== Results ==
The players who qualified for the Candidates Tournament are marked with a green background.

Years	Stages	Total prize money	Winner	Runner-up	Third place	Format
2008–10	6	€1,272,000	(Armenia) Levon Aronian	(Azerbaijan) Teimour Radjabov	(Russia) Alexander Grischuk	21 players, each played 4 of 6 14-player single round-robin
2012–13	6	€1,440,000	(Bulgaria) Veselin Topalov	(Azerbaijan) Shakhriyar Mamedyarov	(Italy) Fabiano Caruana	18 players, each played 4 of 6 12-player single round-robin
2014–15	4	€480,000	(Italy) Fabiano Caruana	(United States) Hikaru Nakamura	(Russia) Dmitry Jakovenko	16 players, each played 3 of 4 12-player single round-robin
2017	4	€520,000	(Azerbaijan) Shakhriyar Mamedyarov	(Russia) Alexander Grischuk	(Azerbaijan) Teimour Radjabov	24 players, each played 3 of 4 18-player Swiss
2019	4	€800,000	(Russia) Alexander Grischuk	(Russia) Ian Nepomniachtchi	(France) Maxime Vachier-Lagrave	21 players, each played 3 of 4 16-player knockout
2022	3	€450,000	(United States) Hikaru Nakamura	(Hungary) Richárd Rapport	(United States) Wesley So	24 players, each played 2 of 3 16-player hybrid

== See also ==
- FIDE Women's Grand Prix
- Chess World Cup
