= Alexandru Groapă =

Bessarabian politician (1879–1940)

Member of the Moldovan Parliament
- In office 1917–1918

Personal details
- Born: 14 August 1879 Chirileni

Alexandru Groapă (14 August 1879, Chirileni - 1940) was a Bessarabian politician.

== Biography ==
He served as Member of the Moldovan Parliament (1917–1918).

== Gallery ==
Moldovan stamp, 1998
