= Candidates Tournament 2018 =

Chess tournament in Berlin, Germany

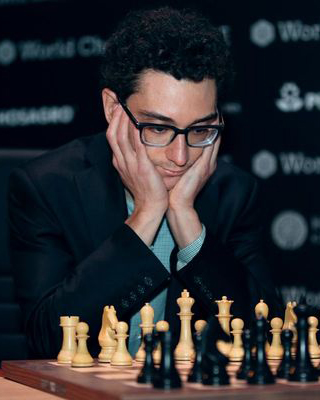
- Fabiano Caruana, the winner of the Candidates Tournament 2018, advanced to the World Chess Championship 2018 match.
- Venue: Kühlhaus Berlin
- Location: Berlin, Germany
- Dates: 10–28 March 2018
- Competitors: 8 from 5 nations
- Winning score: 9 points of 14

Champion
- (United States) Fabiano Caruana

The Candidates Tournament 2018 was an eight-player double round-robin chess tournament, which was held in Berlin, Germany, between 10–28 March 2018. The winner, Fabiano Caruana, earned the right to challenge the defending world champion, Magnus Carlsen of Norway, in the World Chess Championship 2018 match.

FIDE's commercial partner Agon was the official organizer.

== Organization ==
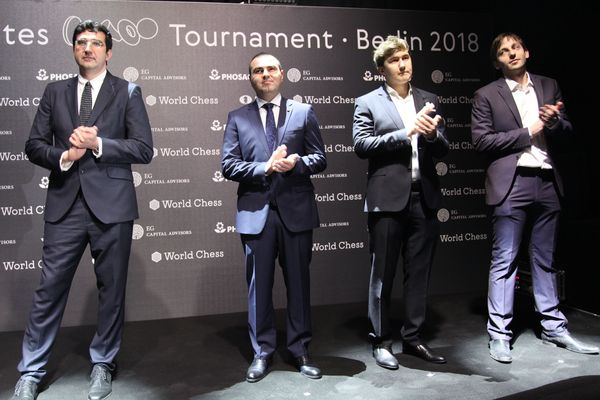
Kramnik, Mamedyarov, Karjakin, and Grischuk during the opening ceremony.

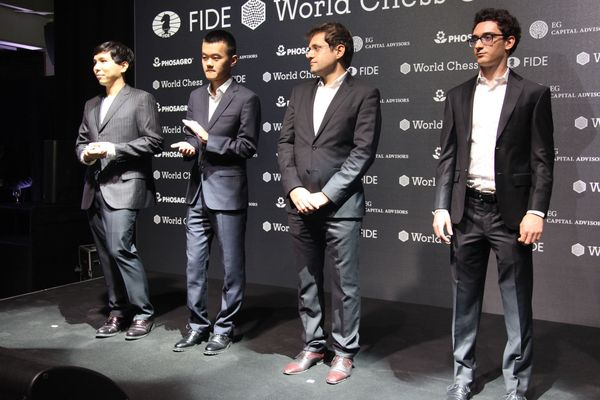
So, Ding, Aronian, and Caruana during the opening ceremony.

The tournament was contested as an eight player, double round-robin tournament, meaning there were 14 rounds with each player facing each other twice: once with the black pieces and once with the white pieces.

=== Prize fund ===
The prize fund (Regulations 3.8.1) was €420,000 (US$516,000). Prize money was divided equally between players with the same score.

Place	Prize money (in €)
1	95,000
2	88,000
3	75,000
4	55,000
5	40,000
6	28,000
7	22,000
8	17,000

=== Regulations ===
The time control was 100 minutes for the first 40 moves, 50 minutes for the next 20 moves and then 15 minutes for the rest of the game; plus a 30-second increment per move starting from move 1.

In the event of a tie, the following tie breaks were used, in order:

1. Results in the games between the tied players;
2. The most wins;
3. Sonneborn–Berger score;
4. Two tie break games between each tied player, at a time limit of 25 minutes, plus 10 second increment per move;
5. Two tie break games between each tied player, at a time limit of 5 minutes, plus 3 second increment per move;
6. Armageddon games, at a time limit of 5 minutes for white, and 4 minutes for black, plus 3 seconds per move after move 60; with white having to win and black having to draw or win. If more than two players tied, they were to play a knock-out tournament.

=== Controversies ===
Several players criticized the organization of the tournament. In particular, there were complaints about noise in the playing venue, bathroom facilities, hotel accommodations, and even television screens with commentary on the tournament that were visible to the players during the games. Sergey Karjakin summed up the complaints after round one: "Actually I don't like almost anything in the organization of the tournament. I don't like the hotel, I don't like the venue and also it was a few times very noisy during the game. I don't want to say that I lost because of all these things, but I basically don't like anything."

FIDE announced a "Live Moves Broadcasting Policy" that they proposed to apply to the tournament. This was widely seen as an attack on third-party broadcasters of the event, such as Chess24 and Chessbrah. The policy was also seen as a continuation of FIDE's legal fight with Chess24 and other Internet sites.

== Qualifiers ==
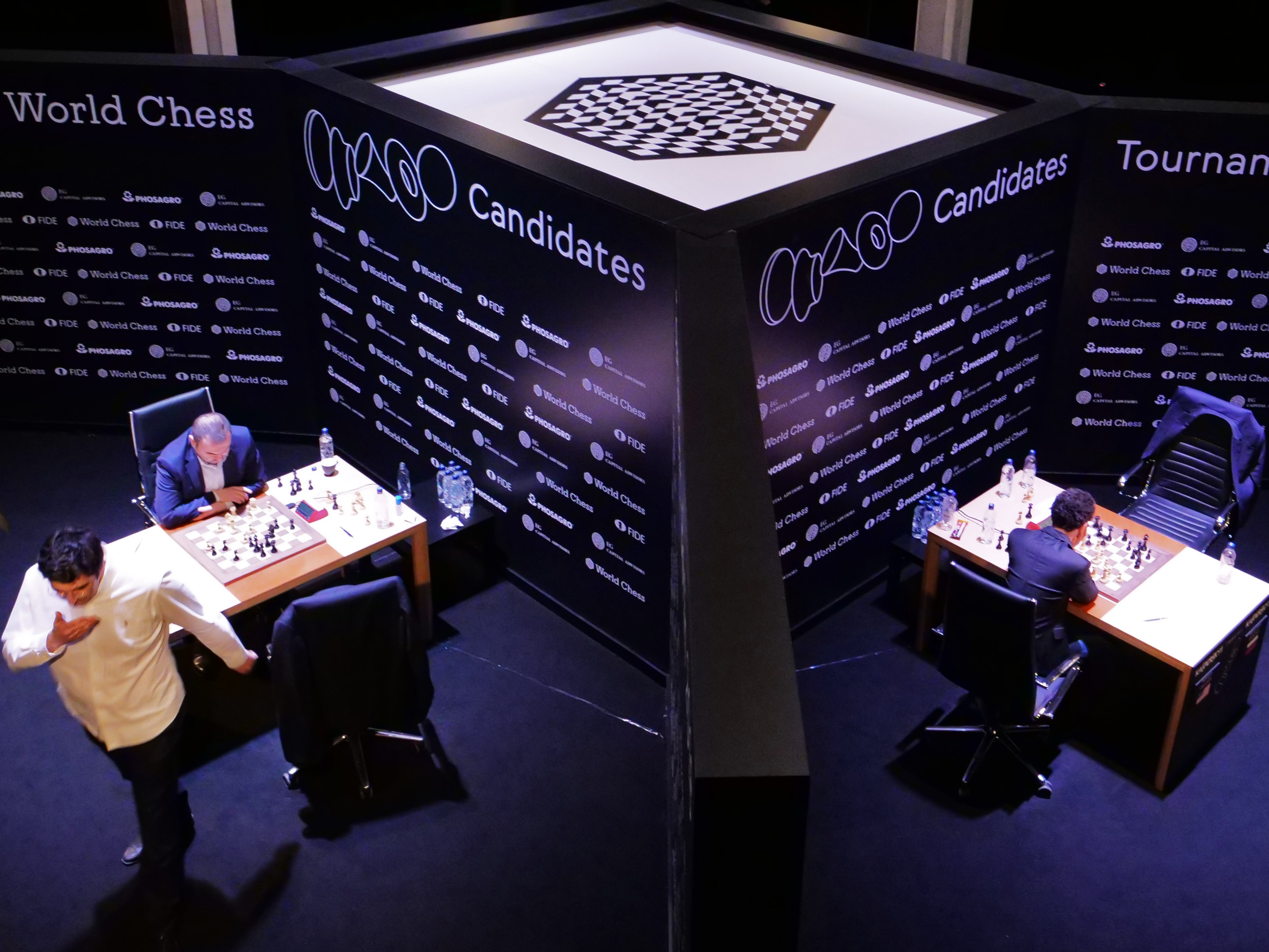
View of round 6 from the audience: left Mamedyarov (seated) and Kramnik; right Caruana.

There were five different qualification paths to the Candidates Tournament. In order of priority, these are: loser of the World Chess Championship 2016 match, the top two finishers in the Chess World Cup 2017, the top two finishers in the FIDE Grand Prix 2017, next two highest rated players (average FIDE rating on the 12 monthly lists from January to December 2017, with at least 30 games played) who played in Chess World Cup 2017 or FIDE Grand Prix 2017, and one player nominated by the organizers (Agon).

Two players qualified by average rating of 2017. By September 2017, it was clear that this was a three-man race between Fabiano Caruana, Wesley So and Vladimir Kramnik. By mid-October 2017, Caruana and So had a near-decisive lead, but this was resolved on October 30 when Kramnik was named as the wild card candidate, assuring Caruana and So of qualifying by rating. According to the regulations, the first reserve player was the next highest placed player in the Grand Prix, Teimour Radjabov, and further reserves were the next highest players by their average of the 2017 ratings lists, starting with Maxime Vachier-Lagrave.

Qualification path	Player	Age	Rating (Mar. 2018)	World ranking (Mar. 2018)
2016 World Championship runner-up	(Russia) Sergey Karjakin	28	2763	13
The top two finishers in the Chess World Cup 2017	(Armenia) Levon Aronian	35	2794	5
The top two finishers in the Chess World Cup 2017	(China) Ding Liren	25	2769	11
The top two finishers in the FIDE Grand Prix 2017	(Azerbaijan) Shakhriyar Mamedyarov	32	2809	2
The top two finishers in the FIDE Grand Prix 2017	(Russia) Alexander Grischuk	34	2767	12
The top two players with highest average 2017 rating who played in World Cup or Grand Prix	(United States) Fabiano Caruana	25	2784	8
The top two players with highest average 2017 rating who played in World Cup or Grand Prix	(United States) Wesley So	24	2799	4
Wild card nomination by the organisers Agon, with FIDE rating at least 2725 in any FIDE published rating list in 2017	(Russia) Vladimir Kramnik	42	2800	3

=== Qualifiers by rating ===
The following were the final placings of players attempting to qualify by the 2017 rating lists.

The list omits world champion Magnus Carlsen. Players who qualified for the Candidates Tournament by other means are shown with a shaded background. The two qualifiers by rating were Fabiano Caruana and Wesley So (marked with a green background).

Player	Jan	Feb	Mar	Apr	May	Jun	Jul	Aug	Sep	Oct	Nov	Dec	Average
(United States) Fabiano Caruana	2827	2827	2817	2817	2802	2808	2807	2807	2799	2794	2799	2799	2808.58
(United States) Wesley So	2808	2822	2822	2822	2815	2812	2810	2810	2792	2788	2788	2788	2806.42
(Russia) Vladimir Kramnik	2811	2811	2811	2811	2811	2808	2812	2803	2803	2794	2787	2787	2804.08
(France) Maxime Vachier-Lagrave	2796	2796	2803	2803	2795	2796	2791	2789	2804	2794	2796	2789	2796.00
(Armenia) Levon Aronian	2780	2785	2774	2774	2789	2793	2809	2799	2802	2801	2801	2805	2792.67
(United States) Hikaru Nakamura	2785	2785	2793	2793	2786	2785	2792	2792	2781	2774	2780	2781	2785.58
(India) Viswanathan Anand	2786	2786	2786	2786	2786	2786	2783	2783	2794	2783	2782	2782	2785.25

=== Predictions ===
Before the tournament, Maxime Vachier-Lagrave (the highest rated player not playing, other than world champion Carlsen) considered the joint favourites to be Aronian and Caruana, and also noted that the betting markets said a similar thing. He considered the next most likely to be either Mamedyarov or Kramnik.

== Schedule ==
FIDE announced the pairings one month before the event. There was a country-diversion system, so players from the same country met as early as possible. Grischuk, Karjakin, and Kramnik (all from Russia) played each other in rounds 1, 2 and 3 as well as with colours reversed in rounds 8, 9 and 10. Similarly So and Caruana (both from the United States) played each other in rounds 1 and 8.

Games began at 15:00 local time (14:00 UTC before 25 March, 13:00 UTC after 25 March), each day from 10 to 27 March, except for rest days on 13, 17, 21, and 25 March (after rounds 3, 6, 9 and 12 respectively). If needed, tiebreak games were to be played on 28 March. The opening ceremony was on 9 March, and the closing ceremony on 28 March.

Date	Day	Event
9 March	Friday	Opening ceremony
10 March	Saturday	Round 1
11 March	Sunday	Round 2
12 March	Monday	Round 3
13 March	Tuesday	Rest day
14 March	Wednesday	Round 4
15 March	Thursday	Round 5
16 March	Friday	Round 6
17 March	Saturday	Rest day
18 March	Sunday	Round 7

Date	Day	Event
19 March	Monday	Round 8
20 March	Tuesday	Round 9
21 March	Wednesday	Rest day
22 March	Thursday	Round 10
23 March	Friday	Round 11
24 March	Saturday	Round 12
25 March	Sunday	Rest day
26 March	Monday	Round 13
27 March	Tuesday	Round 14
28 March	Wednesday	Closing ceremony

== Summary ==
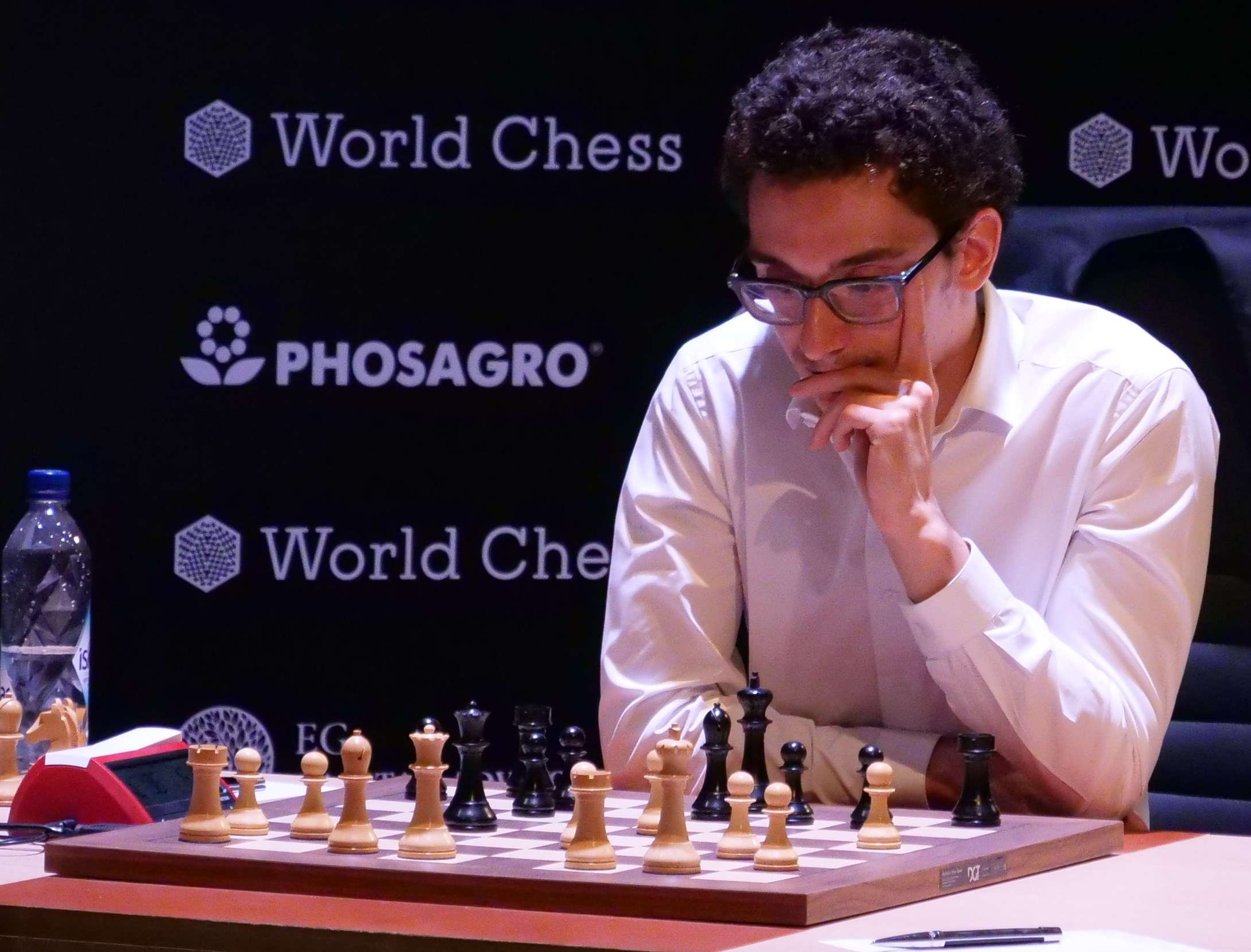
Fabiano Caruana during the Round 10 game against Shakhriyar Mamedyarov.

Caruana, Mamedyarov and Kramnik all won in round 1, then Kramnik took the lead with a brilliant win with black against Aronian in round 3. However, he started playing very optimistically, and consistently overestimated his position in the subsequent rounds. This led to him losing tough games, first to Caruana in round 4, then to Mamedyarov in round 6. At the halfway point, the scores were Caruana +3; Mamedyarov +2; Kramnik, Grischuk and Ding even; Karjakin −1, and So and Aronian −2. 2016 challenger Karjakin had suffered two losses in the early rounds. Aronian, one of the pre-tournament favourites, had bounced back from his loss to Kramnik with a win over Karjakin, but was promptly defeated by So, and was equal last.

In the middle portion of the tournament, Aronian and Karjakin both tried to make up ground. Karjakin was successful, with wins with white in rounds 7 and 9; while Aronian sought complications, but could not win any more games, and then lost in round 10 to Kramnik. Karjakin then beat Aronian with black in Round 11, joining Grischuk in equal third place on +1. Caruana and Mamedyarov continued to lead, but both drew all their games from rounds 8 to 11, staying on +3 and +2 respectively.

In a sensational round 12, the two leaders each lost for the first time: Caruana to Karjakin, and Mamedyarov to Ding Liren, who had drawn every game to that point. This left five players in contention with 2 rounds to go: Karjakin and Caruana on +2 (with Karjakin leading on tie break), and Mamedyarov, Grischuk and Ding on +1.

In the penultimate round (round 13), Mamedyarov and Caruana defeated Grischuk and Aronian respectively, while Ding Liren and Karjakin drew their games. That gave Caruana (+3) a half-point lead over Karjakin and Mamedyarov (+2) going into the final round, with Ding (+1) a further half-point back. Caruana had worse tie breaks than Mamedyarov and Karjakin, so he had to finish ahead of both of them to win the tournament. Ding Liren also had a mathematical chance to win on tie breaks if all results went his way.

In the last round, Karjakin pressed hard for a win with white against Ding, but after a blunder had to scramble for a draw. Meanwhile, Mamedyarov managed to get a complicated game with black against Kramnik, but could not get enough winning chances and also drew. Caruana obtained a strong position with black against Grischuk and converted it to a win, even though the other games finished before his, meaning he only required a draw to win the tournament.

=== Assessments ===
In a long interview the day after the Candidates ended, Caruana discussed his pre-tournament training, which involved his long-time second Rustam Kasimdzhanov and other grandmasters Cristian Chirila, Leinier Domínguez and Alejandro Ramírez. Caruana reviewed his progress through the tournament and was critical of his tendency to sit on the lead with overly defensive play. He believed that such defensiveness contributed to his twelfth round loss to Karjakin, which threw the tournament open for his competitors. However, Caruana felt that his ability to forget losses relatively quickly was important in his crucial victories against Aronian and Grischuk in the final two rounds. He also estimated his chances against Carlsen in the world championship match as "about 50-50."

At a charity event several days after the tournament, Kramnik and Karjakin also discussed the Candidates. Kramnik said that his "very aggressive and very uncompromising" play might not have been the best practical choice but at least it showed fighting spirit. Karjakin regretted his "terrible start" but thought that Caruana's eventual victory was a "quite fair" result. Both players agreed that Caruana has his chances in the world championship match, though Carlsen remains the favorite.

== Results ==
=== Standings ===
Final standings of the 2018 Candidates Tournament
Rank	Player	Score	H2H	Wins	Qualification	CAR		MAM		KAR		DIN		KRA		GRI		SO		ARO	
1	Fabiano Caruana (USA)	9	—	5	Advance to title match			½	½	½	0	½	½	½	1	½	1	1	½	1	1
2	Shakhriyar Mamedyarov (AZE)	8	1.5	3		½	½			½	1	0	½	1	½	1	½	½	½	½	½
3	Sergey Karjakin (RUS)	8	0.5	4		1	½	0	½			½	½	1	½	½	½	1	½	0	1
4	Ding Liren (CHN)	7.5	—	1		½	½	½	1	½	½			½	½	½	½	½	½	½	½
5	Vladimir Kramnik (RUS)	6.5	1	3		0	½	½	0	½	0	½	½			1	0	½	½	1	1
6	Alexander Grischuk (RUS)	6.5	1	2		0	½	½	0	½	½	½	½	1	0			1	½	½	½
7	Wesley So (USA)	6	—	1		½	0	½	½	½	0	½	½	½	½	½	0			1	½
8	Levon Aronian (ARM)	4.5	—	1		0	0	½	½	0	1	½	½	0	0	½	½	½	0		

Source: FIDE Candidates Tournament 2018 at The Week in Chess
Rules for classification: 1) Points, 2) head-to-head score among tied players, 3) total number of wins, 4) Sonneborn–Berger score, 5) tie-break games.

Note: Numbers in the crosstable in a white background indicate the result playing the respective opponent with the white pieces (black pieces if on a black background).

=== Results by round ===
First named player is white. 1–0 indicates a white win, 0–1 indicates a black win, and ½–½ indicates a draw. Numbers in parentheses show players' scores prior to the round.

Round 1, 10 March 2018
Vladimir Kramnik	Alexander Grischuk	1–0
Sergey Karjakin	Shakhriyar Mamedyarov	0–1
Levon Aronian	Ding Liren	½–½
Fabiano Caruana	Wesley So	1–0
Round 2, 11 March 2018
Alexander Grischuk (0)	Wesley So (0)	1–0
Ding Liren (½)	Fabiano Caruana (1)	½–½
Shakhriyar Mamedyarov (1)	Levon Aronian (½)	½–½
Vladimir Kramnik (1)	Sergey Karjakin (0)	½–½
Round 3, 12 March 2018
Sergey Karjakin (½)	Alexander Grischuk (1)	½–½
Levon Aronian (1)	Vladimir Kramnik (1½)	0–1
Fabiano Caruana (1½)	Shakhriyar Mamedyarov (1½)	½–½
Wesley So (0)	Ding Liren (1)	½–½
Round 4, 14 March 2018
Alexander Grischuk (1½)	Ding Liren (1½)	½–½
Shakhriyar Mamedyarov (2)	Wesley So (½)	½–½
Vladimir Kramnik (2½)	Fabiano Caruana (2)	0–1
Sergey Karjakin (1)	Levon Aronian (1)	0–1
Round 5, 15 March 2018
Levon Aronian (2)	Alexander Grischuk (2)	½–½
Fabiano Caruana (3)	Sergey Karjakin (1)	½–½
Wesley So (1)	Vladimir Kramnik (2½)	½–½
Ding Liren (2)	Shakhriyar Mamedyarov (2½)	½–½
Round 6, 16 March 2018
Fabiano Caruana (3½)	Alexander Grischuk (2½)	½–½
Wesley So (1½)	Levon Aronian (2½)	1–0
Ding Liren (2½)	Sergey Karjakin (1½)	½–½
Shakhriyar Mamedyarov (3)	Vladimir Kramnik (3)	1–0
Round 7, 18 March 2018
Alexander Grischuk (3)	Shakhriyar Mamedyarov (4)	½–½
Vladimir Kramnik (3)	Ding Liren (3)	½–½
Sergey Karjakin (2)	Wesley So (2½)	1–0
Levon Aronian (2½)	Fabiano Caruana (4)	0–1

Round 8, 19 March 2018
Alexander Grischuk (3½)	Vladimir Kramnik (3½)	1–0
Shakhriyar Mamedyarov (4½)	Sergey Karjakin (3)	½–½
Ding Liren (3½)	Levon Aronian (2½)	½–½
Wesley So (2½)	Fabiano Caruana (5)	½–½
Round 9, 20 March 2018
Wesley So (3)	Alexander Grischuk (4½)	½–½
Fabiano Caruana (5½)	Ding Liren (4)	½–½
Levon Aronian (3)	Shakhriyar Mamedyarov (5)	½–½
Sergey Karjakin (3½)	Vladimir Kramnik (3½)	1–0
Round 10, 22 March 2018
Alexander Grischuk (5)	Sergey Karjakin (4½)	½–½
Vladimir Kramnik (3½)	Levon Aronian (3½)	1–0
Shakhriyar Mamedyarov (5½)	Fabiano Caruana (6)	½–½
Ding Liren (4½)	Wesley So (3½)	½–½
Round 11, 23 March 2018
Ding Liren (5)	Alexander Grischuk (5½)	½–½
Wesley So (4)	Shakhriyar Mamedyarov (6)	½–½
Fabiano Caruana (6½)	Vladimir Kramnik (4½)	½–½
Levon Aronian (3½)	Sergey Karjakin (5)	0–1
Round 12, 24 March 2018
Alexander Grischuk (6)	Levon Aronian (3½)	½–½
Sergey Karjakin (6)	Fabiano Caruana (7)	1–0
Vladimir Kramnik (5)	Wesley So (4½)	½–½
Shakhriyar Mamedyarov (6½)	Ding Liren (5½)	0–1
Round 13, 26 March 2018
Shakhriyar Mamedyarov (6½)	Alexander Grischuk (6½)	1–0
Ding Liren (6½)	Vladimir Kramnik (5½)	½–½
Wesley So (5)	Sergey Karjakin (7)	½–½
Fabiano Caruana (7)	Levon Aronian (4)	1–0
Round 14, 27 March 2018
Alexander Grischuk (6½)	Fabiano Caruana (8)	0–1
Levon Aronian (4)	Wesley So (5½)	½–½
Sergey Karjakin (7½)	Ding Liren (7)	½–½
Vladimir Kramnik (6)	Shakhriyar Mamedyarov (7½)	½–½

=== Points by round ===
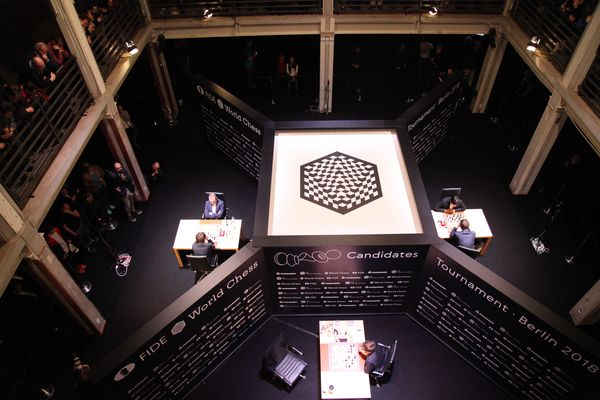
Tournament hall. Spectators could watch the players from above.

For each player, the difference between wins and losses after each round is shown. The players with the highest difference for each round are marked with green background. The players with no more chance of advancing to the title match, in each round, are marked with red background.

Final place	Player \ Round	1	2	3	4	5	6	7	8	9	10	11	12	13	14
1	Fabiano Caruana (USA)	+1	+1	+1	+2	+2	+2	+3	+3	+3	+3	+3	+2	+3	+4
2	Shakhriyar Mamedyarov (AZE)	+1	+1	+1	+1	+1	+2	+2	+2	+2	+2	+2	+1	+2	+2
3	Sergey Karjakin (RUS)	–1	–1	–1	–2	–2	–2	–1	–1	=	=	+1	+2	+2	+2
4	Ding Liren (CHN)	=	=	=	=	=	=	=	=	=	=	=	+1	+1	+1
5	Vladimir Kramnik (RUS)	+1	+1	+2	+1	+1	=	=	–1	–2	–1	–1	–1	–1	–1
6	Alexander Grischuk (RUS)	–1	=	=	=	=	=	=	+1	+1	+1	+1	+1	=	–1
7	Wesley So (USA)	–1	–2	–2	–2	–2	–1	–2	–2	–2	–2	–2	–2	–2	–2
8	Levon Aronian (ARM)	=	=	–1	=	=	–1	–2	–2	–2	–3	–4	–4	–5	–5
