= Chirilă =

Chirilă is a Romanian surname. Notable people with the surname include:

- Ionuț Chirilă
- Josif Chirilă
- Oana Chirilă
- Traian V. Chirilă
- Ioan Chirilă, sports broadcaster and sports novelist
- Ioan-Cristian Chirilă, chess player
