= Chiril River =

Chiril River may refer to the following rivers in Romania:

- Chiril River (Bistrița), a tributary of the Bistrița
- Chiril River (Putna), a tributary of the Putna

== See also ==
- Chiril (disambiguation)
- Chirilovca (disambiguation)
- Chirui River (disambiguation)
