= FIDE Grand Prix 2017 =

Chess tournament series

FIDE Grand Prix Series 2017
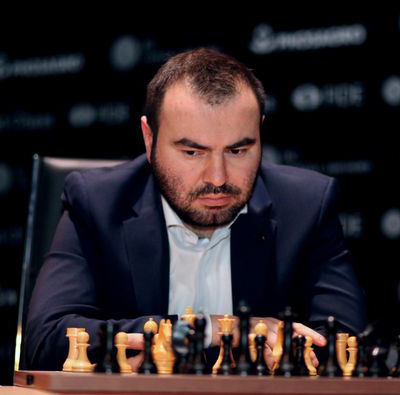
- FIDE Grand Prix 2017 winner Shakhriyar Mamedyarov

Tournament information
- Sport: Chess
- Location: (United Arab Emirates) Sharjah (Russia) Moscow (Switzerland) Geneva (Spain) Palma de Mallorca
- Dates: 18 February 2017– 25 November 2017
- Administrator: FIDE
- Tournament format: Series of Swiss-system tournaments
- Venues: Sharjah Cultural and Chess Club; Central Telegraph; Le Richemond; Iberostar Cristina

Final positions
- Champion: (Azerbaijan) Shakhriyar Mamedyarov
- Runner-up: (Russia) Alexander Grischuk

Tournament 1
- Location: Sharjah
- Dates: 18–27 February 2017
- Champion: Alexander Grischuk; Maxime Vachier-Lagrave; Shakriyar Mamedyarov

Tournament 2
- Location: Moscow
- Dates: 12–21 May 2017
- Champion: Ding Liren
- Runner-up: Shakriyar Mamedyarov

Tournament 3
- Location: Geneva
- Dates: 6–15 July 2017
- Champion: Teimour Radjabov
- Runner-up: Ian Nepomniachtchi; Alexander Grischuk

Tournament 4
- Location: Palma de Mallorca
- Dates: 16–25 November 2017
- Champion: Levon Aronian; Dmitry Jakovenko

The FIDE Grand Prix 2017 was a series of four chess tournaments that formed part of the qualification cycle for the World Chess Championship 2018. The top two finishers, Shakhriyar Mamedyarov and Alexander Grischuk, qualified to the 2018 Candidates Tournament.

== Format ==
There were four tournaments in the cycle; each consisted of 18 players. 24 players were selected to compete in the tournaments, and each player competed in three of the four tournaments.

In contrast to the previous editions where players played a full round-robin, each tournament was an 18 player, nine-round Swiss-system tournament. In each round players scored 1 point for a win, ½ point for a draw and 0 for a loss. Grand Prix points were then allocated according to each player's standing in the tournament, as shown in the table below.

== Players ==
The Grand Prix consisted of 24 players. Two players qualified to be among the 24 by being finalists in the World Chess Championship 2016 match; four players qualified by reaching the semifinals of the Chess World Cup 2015, eight players qualified based on their ratings; one player qualified by participation in the Association of Chess Professionals, and finally nine players rated at least 2700 (or 2600 for former men and women national or world champions) were nominated by Agon and FIDE.

In an interview with Chessdom (Aug 2016), Zurab Azmaiparashvili (president of the European Chess Union) indicated various plusses and minuses with the new system, particularly that the nine "wild card" entries were less expensive than in previous versions. However, with few details available and many questions unanswered, he also was unsure of the professionality of Agon's approach.

At the FIDE General Assembly in September, Agon presented Vladimir Kramnik as having Russia as a national sponsor, which if true would have been the first time that he participated in the FIDE Grand Prix.

Any player who declined to participate in the Grand Prix was replaced by another player who was rated over 2700. Players who held an entry spot but did not enter the Grand Prix were: Magnus Carlsen and Sergey Karjakin from the World Chess Championship 2016, Fabiano Caruana, Viswanathan Anand, Veselin Topalov, Vladimir Kramnik, and Wesley So from the rating list.

| Invitee | Country | Qualifying method |
|---|---|---|
| Peter Svidler | Russia | Chess World Cup 2015 runner-up |
| Pavel Eljanov | Ukraine | Chess World Cup 2015 semi-finalists |
| Anish Giri | Netherlands | Chess World Cup 2015 semi-finalists |
| Hikaru Nakamura | United States | FIDE rating list (from June 2015 to May 2016) |
| Levon Aronian | Armenia | FIDE rating list (from June 2015 to May 2016) |
| Ding Liren | China | FIDE rating list (from June 2015 to May 2016) |
| Maxime Vachier-Lagrave | France | FIDE rating list (from June 2015 to May 2016) |
| Alexander Grischuk | Russia | FIDE rating list (from June 2015 to May 2016) |
| Li Chao | China | FIDE rating list (from June 2015 to May 2016) |
| Pentala Harikrishna | India | FIDE rating list (from June 2015 to May 2016) |
| Shakhriyar Mamedyarov | Azerbaijan | FIDE rating list (from June 2015 to May 2016) |
| Dmitry Jakovenko | Russia | FIDE rating list (from June 2015 to May 2016) |
| Boris Gelfand | Israel | FIDE rating list (from June 2015 to May 2016) |
| Michael Adams | England | FIDE rating list (from June 2015 to May 2016) |
| Evgeny Tomashevsky | Russia | ACP Tour ranking |
| Teimour Radjabov | Azerbaijan | organiser's nominees |
| Ernesto Inarkiev | Russia | organiser's nominees |
| Francisco Vallejo Pons | Spain | organiser's nominees |
| Salem Saleh | United Arab Emirates | organiser's nominees |
| Hou Yifan | China | organiser's nominees |
| Jon Ludvig Hammer | Norway | organiser's nominees |
| Ian Nepomniachtchi | Russia | organiser's nominees |
| Alexander Riazantsev | Russia | organiser's nominees |
| Richárd Rapport | Hungary | organiser's nominees |

== Prize money and Grand Prix points ==
The total prize money was €130,000 per single Grand Prix, or €520,000 for the total Grand Prix series. This money was allocated based on ranking in each individual tournament.

Additionally, each player who could recruit a sponsor received €20,000.

| Place | Single Grand Prix event | Grand Prix points |
|---|---|---|
| 1 | €20,000 | 170 |
| 2 | €15,000 | 140 |
| 3 | €12,000 | 110 |
| 4 | €11,000 | 90 |
| 5 | €10,000 | 80 |
| 6 | €9,000 | 70 |
| 7 | €8,000 | 60 |
| 8 | €7,000 | 50 |
| 9 | €6,000 | 40 |
| 10 | €5,000 | 30 |
| 11 | €4,250 | 20 |
| 12 | €4,000 | 10 |
| 13 | €3,750 | 8 |
| 14 | €3,500 | 6 |
| 15 | €3,250 | 4 |
| 16 | €3,000 | 3 |
| 17 | €2,750 | 2 |
| 18 | €2,500 | 1 |

== Tie breaks ==
With the objective of determining qualifiers to play in the Candidates Tournament 2018, and in the case that two or more players had equal cumulative points at the top, the following criteria were utilized to decide the overall Series winner and other overall placings:

1. Number of actual game result points scored in the three tournaments entered.
2. Number of games played with black.
3. Number of wins.
4. Number of black wins.
5. Drawing of lots.

== Schedule ==
Originally the first event was to take place in October 2016, but it was moved to November 2017, with the other dates mostly the same.

| No. | Host city | Date |
|---|---|---|
| 1 | (United Arab Emirates) Sharjah | 18–27 February 2017 |
| 2 | (Russia) Moscow | 12–21 May 2017 |
| 3 | (Switzerland) Geneva | 6–15 July 2017 |
| 4 | (Spain) Palma de Mallorca | 16–25 November 2017 |

Originally the 3rd Grand Prix (now the 2nd) was to conflict with the World Team Chess Championship, but that event was moved to July where it instead conflicted with the Grand Chess Tour events and Norway Chess.

== Broadcasting boycott ==
FIDE Grand Prix broadcasting rights belonged to Agon, which attempted to limit broadcasting of moves to its own website. In protest, chess24 refused to relay or mention the Grand Prix starting from Moscow 2017.

== Events crosstables ==
The notation in the crosstable is the number of the opponent, color of pieces, and score. For example, in the top-left hand corner of the Sharjah 2017 crosstable, 16w½ indicates that in round 1, Grischuk played player 16 (Jon Ludvig Hammer) with the white pieces, and the game ended in a draw. The player numbers do not exactly correspond to finishing position; for instance Grischuk, Vachier-Lagrave and Mamedyarov all finished equal first, but are allocated numbers 1, 2 and 3 for convenience of notation.

=== Sharjah 2017 ===
1st stage, Sharjah, UAE, 18–27 February 2017
| | Player | Rating | 1 | 2 | 3 | 4 | 5 | 6 | 7 | 8 | 9 | Total | RC | Blacks | Wins | BW | TPR | GP |
|---|---|---|---|---|---|---|---|---|---|---|---|---|---|---|---|---|---|---|
| 1 | Alexander Grischuk (RUS) | 2742 | 16w½ | 6b½ | 13w½ | 8b½ | 10w1 | 7b½ | 5w½ | 3w1 | 2b½ | 5½ | +11 | 4 | 2 | 0 | 2828 | 140 |
| 2 | Maxime Vachier-Lagrave (FRA) | 2796 | 11w1 | 9b1 | 3w½ | 7b½ | 13w½ | 5b½ | 6w½ | 8b½ | 1w½ | 5½ | +4 | 4 | 2 | 1 | 2824 | 140 |
| 3 | Shakhriyar Mamedyarov (AZE) | 2766 | 12b½ | 17w1 | 2b½ | 5w1 | 7w½ | 6b½ | 8w½ | 1b0 | 14w1 | 5½ | +6 | 4 | 3 | 0 | 2814 | 140 |
| 4 | Ding Liren (CHN) | 2760 | 9w0 | 15b1 | 16w½ | 6b½ | 8w½ | 14b½ | 7w½ | 11b½ | 13w1 | 5 | -2 | 4 | 2 | 1 | 2751 | 70 |
| 5 | Michael Adams (ENG) | 2751 | 15w1 | 13b½ | 10w½ | 3b0 | 16w1 | 2w½ | 1b½ | 6b½ | 7b½ | 5 | +3 | 5 | 2 | 0 | 2779 | 70 |
| 6 | Dmitry Jakovenko (RUS) | 2709 | 7b½ | 1w½ | 14b½ | 4w½ | 18b1 | 3w½ | 2b½ | 5w½ | 8w½ | 5 | +9 | 4 | 1 | 1 | 2784 | 70 |
| 7 | Hikaru Nakamura (USA) | 2785 | 6w½ | 16b½ | 9w1 | 2w½ | 3b½ | 1w½ | 4b½ | 13b½ | 5w½ | 5 | -1 | 4 | 1 | 0 | 2780 | 70 |
| 8 | Ian Nepomniachtchi (RUS) | 2749 | 14b½ | 18w½ | 12b½ | 1w½ | 4b½ | 11w1 | 3b½ | 2w½ | 6b½ | 5 | +2 | 5 | 1 | 0 | 2768 | 70 |
| 9 | Richárd Rapport (HUN) | 2692 | 4b1 | 2w0 | 7b0 | 15w½ | 17b½ | 18w1 | 13w½ | 14b½ | 11w½ | 4½ | +4 | 4 | 2 | 1 | 2726 | 25 |
| 10 | Pavel Eljanov (UKR) | 2759 | 18b½ | 12w½ | 5b½ | 14w½ | 1b0 | 17w½ | 11b0 | 16b1 | 15w1 | 4½ | -8 | 5 | 2 | 1 | 2693 | 25 |
| 11 | Li Chao (CHN) | 2720 | 2b0 | 14w½ | 18b½ | 17w1 | 12b½ | 8b0 | 10w1 | 4w½ | 9b½ | 4½ | +0 | 5 | 2 | 0 | 2722 | 25 |
| 12 | Francisco Vallejo Pons (ESP) | 2709 | 3w½ | 10b½ | 8w½ | 16b½ | 11w½ | 13b½ | 14w½ | 15b½ | 17w½ | 4½ | +1 | 4 | 0 | 0 | 2714 | 25 |
| 13 | Levon Aronian (ARM) | 2785 | 17b½ | 5w½ | 1b½ | 18w½ | 2b½ | 12w½ | 9b½ | 7w½ | 4b0 | 4 | -11 | 5 | 0 | 0 | 2692 | 7 |
| 14 | Hou Yifan (CHN) | 2651 | 8w½ | 11b½ | 6w½ | 10b½ | 15b½ | 4w½ | 12b½ | 9w½ | 3b0 | 4 | +4 | 5 | 0 | 0 | 2681 | 7 |
| 15 | Salem Saleh (UAE) | 2656 | 5b0 | 4w0 | 17b½ | 9b½ | 14w½ | 16b½ | 18w1 | 12w½ | 10b0 | 3½ | -4 | 5 | 1 | 0 | 2624 | 3 |
| 16 | Jon Ludvig Hammer (NOR) | 2628 | 1b½ | 7w½ | 4b½ | 12w½ | 5b0 | 15w½ | 17b½ | 10w0 | 18b½ | 3½ | +2 | 5 | 0 | 0 | 2647 | 3 |
| 17 | Evgeny Tomashevsky (RUS) | 2711 | 13w½ | 3b0 | 15w½ | 11b0 | 9w½ | 10b½ | 16w½ | 18b½ | 12b½ | 3½ | -10 | 5 | 0 | 0 | 2630 | 3 |
| 18 | Alexander Riazantsev (RUS) | 2671 | 10w½ | 8b½ | 11w½ | 13b½ | 6w0 | 9b0 | 15b0 | 17w½ | 16w½ | 3 | -10 | 4 | 0 | 0 | 2587 | 1 |

=== Moscow 2017 ===
2nd stage, Moscow, Russia, 12–21 May 2017
| | Player | Rating | 1 | 2 | 3 | 4 | 5 | 6 | 7 | 8 | 9 | Total | RC | Blacks | Wins | BW | TPR | GP |
|---|---|---|---|---|---|---|---|---|---|---|---|---|---|---|---|---|---|---|
| 1 | Ding Liren (CHN) | 2773 | 4b½ | 18w1 | 3b1 | 5w½ | 2b½ | 8w½ | 7b½ | 9w½ | 10b1 | 6 | +12 | 5 | 3 | 2 | 2870 | 170 |
| 2 | Shakhriyar Mamedyarov (AZE) | 2772 | 14w½ | 10b½ | 17w1 | 16b1 | 1w½ | 4b½ | 6w½ | 5b½ | 8w½ | 5½ | +5 | 4 | 2 | 1 | 2813 | 140 |
| 3 | Hou Yifan (CHN) | 2652 | 15b1 | 8w½ | 1w0 | 7b½ | 6w0 | 16b½ | 13w1 | 14w½ | 18b1 | 5 | +14 | 4 | 3 | 2 | 2770 | 71$\tfrac{3}{7}$ |
| 4 | Teimour Radjabov (AZE) | 2710 | 1w½ | 7b½ | 6w½ | 14b1 | 5b½ | 2w½ | 8b½ | 10w½ | 12b½ | 5 | +11 | 5 | 1 | 1 | 2800 | 71$\tfrac{3}{7}$ |
| 5 | Peter Svidler (RUS) | 2755 | 11b½ | 16w½ | 12b1 | 1b½ | 4w½ | 6b½ | 10w½ | 2w½ | 7b½ | 5 | +2 | 5 | 1 | 1 | 2776 | 71$\tfrac{3}{7}$ |
| 6 | Alexander Grischuk (RUS) | 2750 | 16b½ | 11w½ | 4b½ | 8w½ | 3b1 | 5w½ | 2b½ | 7w½ | 9b½ | 5 | +3 | 5 | 1 | 1 | 2775 | 71$\tfrac{3}{7}$ |
| 7 | Hikaru Nakamura (USA) | 2786 | 18b½ | 4w½ | 11b½ | 3w½ | 9b½ | 15w1 | 1w½ | 6b½ | 5w½ | 5 | -1 | 4 | 1 | 0 | 2776 | 71$\tfrac{3}{7}$ |
| 8 | Maxime Vachier-Lagrave (FRA) | 2795 | 17w½ | 3b½ | 10w½ | 6b½ | 16w1 | 1b½ | 4w½ | 11b½ | 2b½ | 5 | -5 | 5 | 1 | 0 | 2760 | 71$\tfrac{3}{7}$ |
| 9 | Anish Giri (NED) | 2785 | 10w½ | 17b½ | 14w½ | 13b½ | 7w½ | 11b½ | 16w1 | 1b½ | 6w½ | 5 | -3 | 4 | 1 | 0 | 2759 | 71$\tfrac{3}{7}$ |
| 10 | Boris Gelfand (ISR) | 2724 | 9b½ | 2w½ | 8b½ | 11w½ | 15b½ | 12w1 | 5b½ | 4b½ | 1w0 | 4½ | +4 | 5 | 1 | 0 | 2754 | 20 |
| 11 | Evgeny Tomashevsky (RUS) | 2696 | 5w½ | 6b½ | 7w½ | 10b½ | 13w½ | 9w½ | 12b½ | 8w½ | 17b½ | 4½ | +6 | 4 | 0 | 0 | 2746 | 20 |
| 12 | Pentala Harikrishna (IND) | 2750 | 13w½ | 14b½ | 5w0 | 18b½ | 17w1 | 10b0 | 11w½ | 15b1 | 4w½ | 4½ | -4 | 4 | 2 | 1 | 2716 | 20 |
| 13 | Jon Ludvig Hammer (NOR) | 2621 | 12b½ | 15w0 | 18b1 | 9w½ | 11b½ | 14w½ | 3b0 | 17w½ | 16b½ | 4 | +7 | 5 | 1 | 1 | 2674 | 7 |
| 14 | Francisco Vallejo Pons (ESP) | 2710 | 2b½ | 12w½ | 9b½ | 4w0 | 18w½ | 13b½ | 17w½ | 3b½ | 15w½ | 4 | -3 | 4 | 0 | 0 | 2681 | 7 |
| 15 | Ian Nepomniachtchi (RUS) | 2751 | 3w0 | 13b1 | 16w0 | 17b1 | 10w½ | 7b0 | 18b½ | 12w0 | 14b½ | 3½ | -16 | 5 | 2 | 2 | 2626 | 3 |
| 16 | Salem Saleh (UAE) | 2633 | 6w½ | 5b½ | 15b1 | 2w0 | 8b0 | 3w½ | 9b0 | 18w½ | 13w½ | 3½ | +2 | 4 | 1 | 1 | 2654 | 3 |
| 17 | Michael Adams (ENG) | 2747 | 8b½ | 9w½ | 2b0 | 15w0 | 12b0 | 18w1 | 14b½ | 13b½ | 11w½ | 3½ | -12 | 5 | 1 | 0 | 2654 | 3 |
| 18 | Ernesto Inarkiev (RUS) | 2727 | 7w½ | 1b0 | 13w0 | 12w½ | 14b½ | 17b0 | 15w½ | 16b½ | 3w0 | 2½ | -22 | 4 | 0 | 0 | 2548 | 1 |

=== Geneva 2017 ===
3rd stage, Geneva, Switzerland, 6–15 July 2017
| | Player | Rating | 1 | 2 | 3 | 4 | 5 | 6 | 7 | 8 | 9 | Total | RC | Blacks | Wins | BW | TPR | GP |
|---|---|---|---|---|---|---|---|---|---|---|---|---|---|---|---|---|---|---|
| 1 | Teimour Radjabov (AZE) | 2724 | 5b1 | 11w1 | 12b½ | 4w½ | 10b½ | 3b½ | 9w1 | 6w½ | 2b½ | 6 | +18 | 5 | 3 | 1 | 2877 | 170 |
| 2 | Ian Nepomniachtchi (RUS) | 2742 | 16b½ | 14w½ | 11b0 | 17w1 | 4b½ | 15w1 | 10b½ | 12w1 | 1w½ | 5½ | +9 | 4 | 3 | 0 | 2814 | 125 |
| 3 | Alexander Grischuk (RUS) | 2761 | 15b½ | 16w1 | 7b½ | 12w½ | 11b1 | 1w½ | 4b½ | 10w½ | 5b½ | 5½ | +8 | 5 | 2 | 1 | 2827 | 125 |
| 4 | Pentala Harikrishna (IND) | 2737 | 6b1 | 7w½ | 10w½ | 1b½ | 2w½ | 12b1 | 3w½ | 8b0 | 13w½ | 5 | +6 | 4 | 2 | 2 | 2783 | 60 |
| 5 | Anish Giri (NED) | 2775 | 1w0 | 18b1 | 8w½ | 14b½ | 6w½ | 13b½ | 12w½ | 17b1 | 3w½ | 5 | -3 | 4 | 2 | 2 | 2756 | 60 |
| 6 | Alexander Riazantsev (RUS) | 2654 | 4w0 | 17b½ | 18w½ | 15w½ | 5b½ | 16b1 | 8w1 | 1b½ | 7w½ | 5 | +12 | 4 | 2 | 1 | 2755 | 60 |
| 7 | Michael Adams (ENG) | 2736 | 18w1 | 4b½ | 3w½ | 9b0 | 8w½ | 14b½ | 13w½ | 16b1 | 6b½ | 5 | +2 | 5 | 2 | 1 | 2754 | 60 |
| 8 | Li Chao (CHN) | 2735 | 12b½ | 9w½ | 5b½ | 13w½ | 7b½ | 11w1 | 6b0 | 4w1 | 10b½ | 5 | +6 | 5 | 2 | 0 | 2788 | 60 |
| 9 | Peter Svidler (RUS) | 2749 | 13w½ | 8b½ | 14w½ | 7w1 | 12b½ | 10w½ | 1b0 | 18b½ | 17w1 | 5 | +2 | 5 | 2 | 0 | 2770 | 60 |
| 10 | Shakhriyar Mamedyarov (AZE) | 2800 | 14b½ | 15w1 | 4b½ | 11w½ | 1w½ | 9b½ | 2w½ | 3b½ | 8w½ | 5 | -3 | 4 | 1 | 0 | 2779 | 60 |
| 11 | Pavel Eljanov (UKR) | 2739 | 17w1 | 1b0 | 2w1 | 10b½ | 3w0 | 8b0 | 18w1 | 14b½ | 16w½ | 4½ | -2 | 4 | 3 | 0 | 2721 | 11 |
| 12 | Levon Aronian (ARM) | 2809 | 8w½ | 13b1 | 1w½ | 3b½ | 9w½ | 4w0 | 5b½ | 2b0 | 18w1 | 4½ | -10 | 4 | 2 | 1 | 2729 | 11 |
| 13 | Dmitry Jakovenko (RUS) | 2703 | 9b½ | 12w0 | 16b1 | 8b½ | 14w½ | 5w½ | 7b½ | 15w½ | 4b½ | 4½ | +5 | 5 | 1 | 1 | 2741 | 11 |
| 14 | Boris Gelfand (ISR) | 2728 | 10w½ | 2b½ | 9b½ | 5w½ | 13b½ | 7w½ | 17b½ | 11w½ | 15b½ | 4½ | +1 | 5 | 0 | 0 | 2735 | 11 |
| 15 | Ernesto Inarkiev (RUS) | 2707 | 3w½ | 10b0 | 17w½ | 6b½ | 18w1 | 2b0 | 16w½ | 13b½ | 14w½ | 4 | -5 | 4 | 1 | 0 | 2667 | 4 |
| 16 | Richárd Rapport (HUN) | 2694 | 2w½ | 3b0 | 13w0 | 18b0 | 17b1 | 6w0 | 15b½ | 7w0 | 11b½ | 2½ | -19 | 5 | 1 | 1 | 2539 | 2 |
| 17 | Hou Yifan (CHN) | 2666 | 11b0 | 6w½ | 15b½ | 2b0 | 16w0 | 18b1 | 14w½ | 5w0 | 9b0 | 2½ | -14 | 4 | 1 | 1 | 2548 | 2 |
| 18 | Salem Saleh (UAE) | 2638 | 7b0 | 5w0 | 6b½ | 16w1 | 15b0 | 17w0 | 11b0 | 9w½ | 12b0 | 2 | -14 | 5 | 1 | 0 | 2505 | 1 |

=== Palma 2017 ===
Going into the final tournament, only Radjabov and Vachier-Lagrave could overtake Mamedyarov or Grischuk to qualify for the Candidates. (Ding Liren could also finish first or second in the Grand Prix, but had already qualified via the World Cup). Going into the final round of that tournament, both Radjabov and Vachier-Lagrave were equal 2nd-10th, and both would have qualified for the Candidates with a final round win, but neither was able to.

4th stage, Palma de Mallorca, Spain, 16–25 November 2017
| | Player | Rating | 1 | 2 | 3 | 4 | 5 | 6 | 7 | 8 | 9 | Total | RC | Blacks | Wins | BW | TPR | GP |
|---|---|---|---|---|---|---|---|---|---|---|---|---|---|---|---|---|---|---|
| 1 | Levon Aronian (ARM) | 2801 | 2b½ | 12w1 | 10b½ | 13w1 | 4b½ | 5w½ | 9b½ | 8w½ | 3b½ | 5½ | +3 | 5 | 2 | 0 | 2821 | 155 |
| 2 | Dmitry Jakovenko (RUS) | 2721 | 1w½ | 3b½ | 16w½ | 11b1 | 5w½ | 13b½ | 7w½ | 9b½ | 10b1 | 5½ | +13 | 5 | 2 | 2 | 2823 | 155 |
| 3 | Hikaru Nakamura (USA) | 2780 | 11b½ | 2w½ | 8b½ | 6w1 | 10b½ | 4w½ | 5b½ | 7w½ | 1w½ | 5 | +1 | 4 | 1 | 0 | 2792 | 71$\tfrac{3}{7}$ |
| 4 | Ding Liren (CHN) | 2774 | 15w½ | 16b½ | 11w½ | 12b1 | 1w½ | 3b½ | 13w½ | 5b½ | 8b½ | 5 | -1 | 5 | 1 | 1 | 2771 | 71$\tfrac{3}{7}$ |
| 5 | Peter Svidler (RUS) | 2763 | 8b½ | 11w½ | 18b1 | 10w½ | 2b½ | 1b½ | 3w½ | 4w½ | 7b½ | 5 | +2 | 5 | 1 | 1 | 2782 | 71$\tfrac{3}{7}$ |
| 6 | Teimour Radjabov (AZE) | 2741 | 16w½ | 15b1 | 13w½ | 3b0 | 7w½ | 8b0 | 14w1 | 17b1 | 9w½ | 5 | +3 | 4 | 3 | 2 | 2764 | 71$\tfrac{3}{7}$ |
| 7 | Pentala Harikrishna (IND) | 2738 | 18b½ | 8w½ | 12b½ | 15w1 | 6b½ | 10w½ | 2b½ | 3b½ | 5w½ | 5 | +3 | 5 | 1 | 0 | 2767 | 71$\tfrac{3}{7}$ |
| 8 | Evgeny Tomashevsky (RUS) | 2702 | 5w½ | 7b½ | 3w½ | 16b½ | 9w½ | 6w1 | 10b½ | 1b½ | 4w½ | 5 | +11 | 4 | 1 | 0 | 2791 | 71$\tfrac{3}{7}$ |
| 9 | Richárd Rapport (HUN) | 2692 | 13b0 | 17b½ | 14w½ | 18w1 | 8b½ | 16b1 | 1w½ | 2w½ | 6b½ | 5 | +8 | 5 | 2 | 1 | 2762 | 71$\tfrac{3}{7}$ |
| 10 | Maxime Vachier-Lagrave (FRA) | 2796 | 17w1 | 13b½ | 1w½ | 5b½ | 3w½ | 7b½ | 8w½ | 12b½ | 2w0 | 4½ | -7 | 4 | 1 | 0 | 2741 | 20 |
| 11 | Pavel Eljanov (UKR) | 2707 | 3w½ | 5b½ | 4b½ | 2w0 | 12w½ | 14b½ | 18w1 | 15b½ | 17w½ | 4½ | +2 | 4 | 1 | 0 | 2724 | 20 |
| 12 | Ernesto Inarkiev (RUS) | 2683 | 14w1 | 1b0 | 7w½ | 4w0 | 11b½ | 17b1 | 15w½ | 10w½ | 18b½ | 4½ | +6 | 4 | 2 | 1 | 2734 | 20 |
| 13 | Anish Giri (NED) | 2762 | 9w1 | 10w½ | 6b½ | 1b0 | 16w½ | 2w½ | 4b½ | 14b0 | 15w½ | 4 | -8 | 4 | 1 | 0 | 2693 | 6 |
| 14 | Li Chao (CHN) | 2741 | 12b0 | 18w½ | 9b½ | 17w½ | 15b½ | 11w½ | 6b0 | 13w1 | 16b½ | 4 | -10 | 5 | 1 | 0 | 2656 | 6 |
| 15 | Francisco Vallejo Pons (ESP) | 2705 | 4b½ | 6w0 | 17w1 | 7b0 | 14w½ | 18b½ | 12b½ | 11w½ | 13b½ | 4 | -3 | 5 | 1 | 0 | 2679 | 6 |
| 16 | Alexander Riazantsev (RUS) | 2651 | 6b½ | 4w½ | 2b½ | 8w½ | 13b½ | 9w0 | 17w0 | 18b½ | 14w½ | 3½ | -2 | 4 | 0 | 0 | 2640 | 3 |
| 17 | Boris Gelfand (ISR) | 2719 | 10b0 | 9w½ | 15b0 | 14b½ | 18w½ | 12w0 | 16b1 | 6w0 | 11b½ | 3 | -17 | 5 | 1 | 1 | 2580 | 1$\tfrac{1}{2}$ |
| 18 | Jon Ludvig Hammer (NOR) | 2629 | 7w½ | 14b½ | 5w0 | 9b0 | 17b½ | 15w½ | 11b0 | 16w½ | 12w½ | 3 | -5 | 4 | 0 | 0 | 2586 | 1$\tfrac{1}{2}$ |

== Grand Prix standings ==
Grand Prix points in bold indicate a tournament win. Green indicates qualifiers for the Candidates Tournament 2018. Mamedyarov and Grischuk qualified via the Grand Prix. Ding Liren and Aronian qualified via the Chess World Cup 2017.

| | Player | FIDE rating February 2017 | Sharjah | Moscow | Geneva | Palma | Total |
|---|---|---|---|---|---|---|---|
| 1 | Shakhriyar Mamedyarov (AZE) | 2766 | **140** | 140 | 60 | | **340** |
| 2 | Alexander Grischuk (RUS) | 2742 | **140** | 71$\tfrac{3}{7}$ | 125 | | 336$\tfrac{3}{7}$ |
| 3 | Teimour Radjabov (AZE) | 2710 | | 71$\tfrac{3}{7}$ | **170** | 71$\tfrac{3}{7}$ | 312$\tfrac{6}{7}$ |
| 4 | Ding Liren (CHN) | 2760 | 70 | **170** | | 71$\tfrac{3}{7}$ | 311$\tfrac{3}{7}$ |
| 5 | Dmitry Jakovenko (RUS) | 2709 | 70 | | 11 | **155** | **236** |
| 6 | Maxime Vachier-Lagrave (FRA) | 2796 | **140** | 71$\tfrac{3}{7}$ | | 20 | 231$\tfrac{3}{7}$ |
| 7 | Hikaru Nakamura (USA) | 2785 | 70 | 71$\tfrac{3}{7}$ | | 71$\tfrac{3}{7}$ | 212$\tfrac{6}{7}$ |
| 8 | Peter Svidler (RUS) | 2748 | | 71$\tfrac{3}{7}$ | 60 | 71$\tfrac{3}{7}$ | 202$\tfrac{6}{7}$ |
| 9 | Ian Nepomniachtchi (RUS) | 2749 | 70 | 3 | 125 | | **198** |
| 10 | Levon Aronian (ARM) | 2785 | 7 | | 11 | **155** | **173** |
| 11 | Pentala Harikrishna (IND) | 2758 | | 20 | 60 | 71$\tfrac{3}{7}$ | 151$\tfrac{3}{7}$ |
| 12 | Anish Giri (NED) | 2769 | | 71$\tfrac{3}{7}$ | 60 | 6 | 137$\tfrac{3}{7}$ |
| 13 | Michael Adams (ENG) | 2751 | 70 | 3 | 60 | | **133** |
| 14 | Richárd Rapport (HUN) | 2692 | 25 | | 2$\tfrac{1}{2}$ | 71$\tfrac{3}{7}$ | 98$\tfrac{13}{14}$ |
| 15 | Evgeny Tomashevsky (RUS) | 2711 | 3 | 20 | | 71$\tfrac{3}{7}$ | 94$\tfrac{3}{7}$ |
| 16 | Li Chao (CHN) | 2720 | 25 | | 60 | 6 | **91** |
| 17 | Hou Yifan (CHN) | 2651 | 7 | 71$\tfrac{3}{7}$ | 2$\tfrac{1}{2}$ | | 80$\tfrac{13}{14}$ |
| 18 | Alexander Riazantsev (RUS) | 2671 | 1 | | 60 | 3 | **64** |
| 19 | Pavel Eljanov (UKR) | 2759 | 25 | | 11 | 20 | **56** |
| 20 | Francisco Vallejo Pons (ESP) | 2709 | 25 | 7 | | 6 | **38** |
| 21 | Boris Gelfand (ISR) | 2720 | | 20 | 11 | 1$\tfrac{1}{2}$ | 32$\tfrac{1}{2}$ |
| 22 | Ernesto Inarkiev (RUS) | 2723 | | 1 | 4 | 20 | **25** |
| 23 | Jon Ludvig Hammer (NOR) | 2628 | 3 | 7 | | 1$\tfrac{1}{2}$ | 11$\tfrac{1}{2}$ |
| 24 | Salem Saleh (UAE) | 2656 | 3 | 3 | 1 | | **7** |

- Wei Yi was replaced by Hou Yifan.
