= Traian V. Chirilă =

Romanian-Australian polymer and organic chemist

Traian V. Chirilă (born 14 February 1948 in Arad, Romania) is a Romanian-Australian polymer and organic chemist who is the inventor of AlphaCor, an artificial cornea in current clinical use throughout the world.

His past and current research has contributed in several areas of biomaterials, polymer science and bioengineering, especially in the understanding of biomaterials and biocompatibility, in the development of polymers, hydrophilic sponges, artificial cornea, artificial vitreous substitutes and in topics such as interaction of laser radiation with polymers, photoresponsive polymers, supramolecular polymers, sustained release of bioactive agents, tissue engineering and the use of polymers in genetic therapies.

== Education ==
Chirilă was born and educated in Romania, where he obtained a BEng in polymer technology (1972) and a PhD in organic chemistry (1981) from the Polytechnic University of Timișoara.

After ten years of research in polymers and organic chemistry, he relocated to Australia. During 1984 he was a research fellow at the Curtin School of Applied Chemistry. In 1986 he joined Lions Eye Institute in Perth as a senior scientist with the task of establishing a department for research and development of polymeric biomaterials for ophthalmology. In 2005, he joined the newly founded Queensland Eye Institute in Brisbane, where he was offered a position of senior scientist to continue his research and to establish a department of ophthalmic bioengineering. He was made a fellow of Royal Australian Chemical Institute (RACI) in 1992. Currently, he holds three adjunct professorships at the School of Physical and Chemical Sciences of Queensland University of Technology, Australian Institute for Bioengineering and Nanotechnology of University of Queensland, and Faculty of Health Sciences of University of Queensland.

== Research ==
- Contributions to the synthetic and structural chemistry of acetals, especially cyclic acetals.
- Studies of hydrogels containing UV-absorbing agents. Correlating the concentration, absorptive properties and extractability of the agents.
- Interaction of polymers with IR laser radiation – demonstrating that the monomer release following the irradiation of IOL materials with surgical IR lasers is too low to cause deleterious effects in the eye.
- First investigation of interaction between poly(2-hydroxyethyl methacrylate) (PHEMA) and UV laser radiation. First use of X-ray photoelectron spectroscopy to investigate the process of ablation of ophthalmic hydrogels with excimer lasers. General studies on the interaction between high-energy laser radiation and polymers.
- Invention and development of melanin-containing synthetic hydrogels able to absorb UV and blue radiation and their application as IOL materials. First polymer-biopolymer combinations to be reported as interpenetrating polymer networks (IPNs).
- Invention and development of an artificial cornea. Initially known as "Chirila keratoprosthesis", this device has been commercially developed as AlphaCor and received approvals from FDA and other regulatory bodies and is used in human patients.
- Development of hydrogels with very high water content as potential substitutes for the vitreous body, including a methodology for their evaluation in vitro.
- Evaluation of porous hydrogel scaffolds for nerve repair.
- Development and study of polymer matrices for the sustained release of bioactive agents, including therapeutic oligonucleotides.
- Development of an orbital implant, currently commercialised as AlphaSphere.
- Contributions to the history of ophthalmology and biomaterials.
- Development of tissue-engineered corneal constructs for the restoration of ocular surface.

His research has resulted to date in 175 journal publications and 13 patents. He has contributed over 175 presentations at scientific meetings and he has been invited to present lectures in China, the United States, Japan, Romania, Italy, France, Switzerland, Korea, Germany and The Netherlands.

== Memberships ==
- Romanian Academy of Scientists
- Romanian Academy of Scientists (American Branch)
- New York Academy of Sciences
- American Chemical Society
- Royal Australian Chemical Institute
- Australasian Society for Biomaterials and Tissue Engineering
- KPro Study Group

== Personal life ==
He spent his childhood in a small town in Transylvania, Chișineu-Criș, graduating from the local high school in 1966. He is nicknamed "Tanu". His mother died in 2019 while still living in Timisoara, Romania where he graduated from the university. Traian is married to Mika, who is from Japan, and they have a son, Sebastian.
