= Chirilov =

Chirilov is a Romanian-language surname, derived from Chiril:

- Florina Chirilov, a Romanian female volleyball player, member of Romania women's national volleyball team
- Mihai Cristian Chirilov, a Romanian film critic
- Sergiu (Serghei) Chirilov, a Moldovan football manager, futsalist and former professional footballer

== See also ==
- Chiril (name)
- Chirilovca (disambiguation)
- Kirilov
- Kirillov (surname)
