= Chiril (name) =

Chiril is a Romanian-language male given name shared by the following people:

- Chiril Gaburici, a Moldovan businessman and former Prime Minister of Moldova
- Chiril Lucinschi, a Moldovan politician and businessman, former member of Parliament of Moldova
- Chiril Sberea, a Bessarabian politician, member of the Moldovan Parliament (1917–1918)
- Chiril Spinei, a Bessarabian politician, member of the Moldovan Parliament (1917–1918)

== See also ==
- Kiril
- Kirill
- Chirilov
