= World Chess Championship 2018 =

Chess match

Coordinates: 51°31′09″N 00°07′13″W

- The College, Holborn, London, England
- 9–28 November 2018
	Defending champion	Challenger
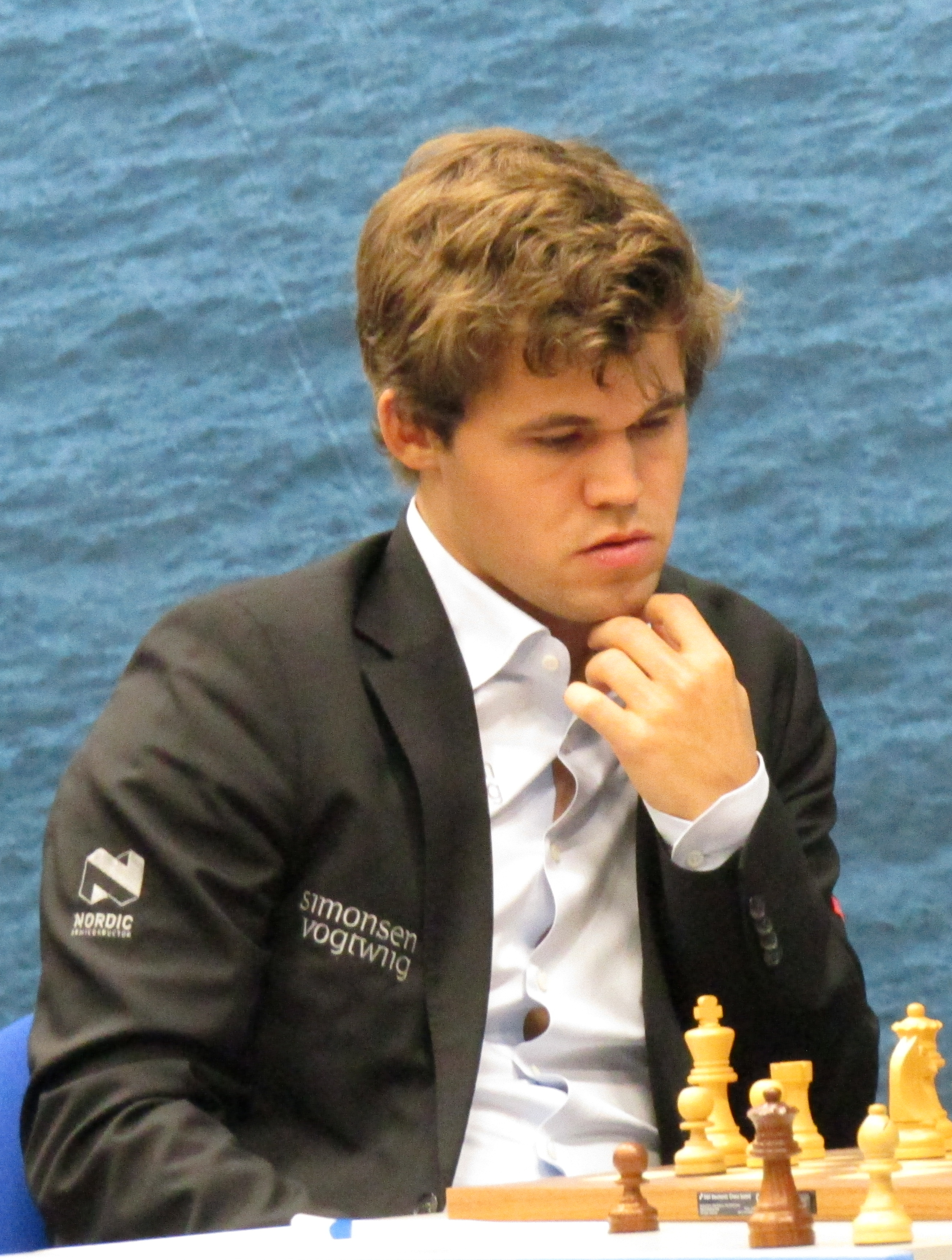
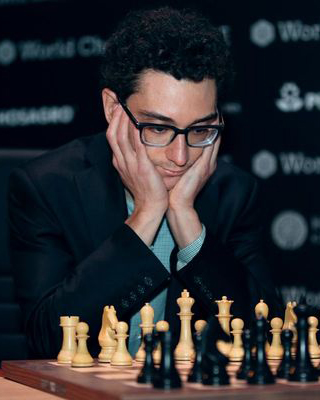
	Magnus Carlsen	Fabiano Caruana
	(Norway) Magnus Carlsen	(United States) Fabiano Caruana
6 (3)	Scores	6 (0)
	Born 30 November 1990; 27 years old	Born 30 July 1992; 26 years old
	Winner of the World Chess Championship 2016	Winner of the Candidates Tournament 2018
	Rating: 2835 (World No. 1)	Rating: 2832 (World No. 2)

Location of the World Chess Championship venue on a map of Westminster and Camden, London

The World Chess Championship 2018 was a match between the reigning world champion since 2013, Magnus Carlsen, and the challenger Fabiano Caruana to determine the World Chess Champion. The 12-game match, organised by FIDE and its commercial partner Agon, was played at The College in Holborn, London, between 9 and 28 November 2018. The games were broadcast on worldchess.com and by NRK.

The classical time-control portion of the match ended with 12 consecutive draws, the only time in the history of the world chess championship that all classical games have been drawn. On 28 November, rapid chess was used as a tie-breaker; Carlsen won three consecutive games to retain his title and became four-time world champion.

== Candidates Tournament ==
Caruana qualified as challenger by winning the 2018 Candidates Tournament. This was an eight-player, double round-robin tournament played in Berlin on 10–28 March 2018.

=== Qualified players ===
Players qualified for the Candidates Tournament as follows (age, rating and world ranking are as of March 2018, when the tournament was held):

Player	Age	Rating	Rank	Qualification path
(Russia) Sergey Karjakin	28	2763	13	The runner-up of the 2016 World Championship match.
(Armenia) Levon Aronian	35	2794	5	The top two finishers in the Chess World Cup 2017 who did not qualify from the 2016 match.
(China) Ding Liren	25	2769	11	The top two finishers in the Chess World Cup 2017 who did not qualify from the 2016 match.
(Azerbaijan) Shakhriyar Mamedyarov	32	2809	2	The top two finishers in the FIDE Grand Prix 2017 who did not qualify through the World Cup.
(Russia) Alexander Grischuk	34	2767	12	The top two finishers in the FIDE Grand Prix 2017 who did not qualify through the World Cup.
(United States) Fabiano Caruana	25	2784	7	The top two players with the highest rating (by the average of all 12 lists in 2017), who did not qualify via one of the above qualification routes, and who have played in either the World Cup or Grand Prix.
(United States) Wesley So	24	2799	4	The top two players with the highest rating (by the average of all 12 lists in 2017), who did not qualify via one of the above qualification routes, and who have played in either the World Cup or Grand Prix.
(Russia) Vladimir Kramnik	42	2800	3	Wild card nomination of the organizers (Agon). Must be rated at least 2725 in any FIDE published rating list in 2017.

=== Results ===
Final standings of the 2018 Candidates Tournament
Rank	Player	Score	H2H	Wins	Qualification	CAR		MAM		KAR		DIN		KRA		GRI		SO		ARO	
1	Fabiano Caruana (USA)	9	—	5	Advance to title match			½	½	½	0	½	½	½	1	½	1	1	½	1	1
2	Shakhriyar Mamedyarov (AZE)	8	1.5	3		½	½			½	1	0	½	1	½	1	½	½	½	½	½
3	Sergey Karjakin (RUS)	8	0.5	4		1	½	0	½			½	½	1	½	½	½	1	½	0	1
4	Ding Liren (CHN)	7.5	—	1		½	½	½	1	½	½			½	½	½	½	½	½	½	½
5	Vladimir Kramnik (RUS)	6.5	1	3		0	½	½	0	½	0	½	½			1	0	½	½	1	1
6	Alexander Grischuk (RUS)	6.5	1	2		0	½	½	0	½	½	½	½	1	0			1	½	½	½
7	Wesley So (USA)	6	—	1		½	0	½	½	½	0	½	½	½	½	½	0			1	½
8	Levon Aronian (ARM)	4.5	—	1		0	0	½	½	0	1	½	½	0	0	½	½	½	0		

Source: FIDE Candidates Tournament 2018 at The Week in Chess
Rules for classification: 1) Points, 2) head-to-head score among tied players, 3) total number of wins, 4) Sonneborn–Berger score, 5) tie-break games.

Note: Numbers in the crosstable in a white background indicate the result playing the respective opponent with the white pieces (black pieces if on a black background).

== Championship match ==
2018 World Chess Championship logo showing five overlapping arms above chessboard holding or moving chess pieces

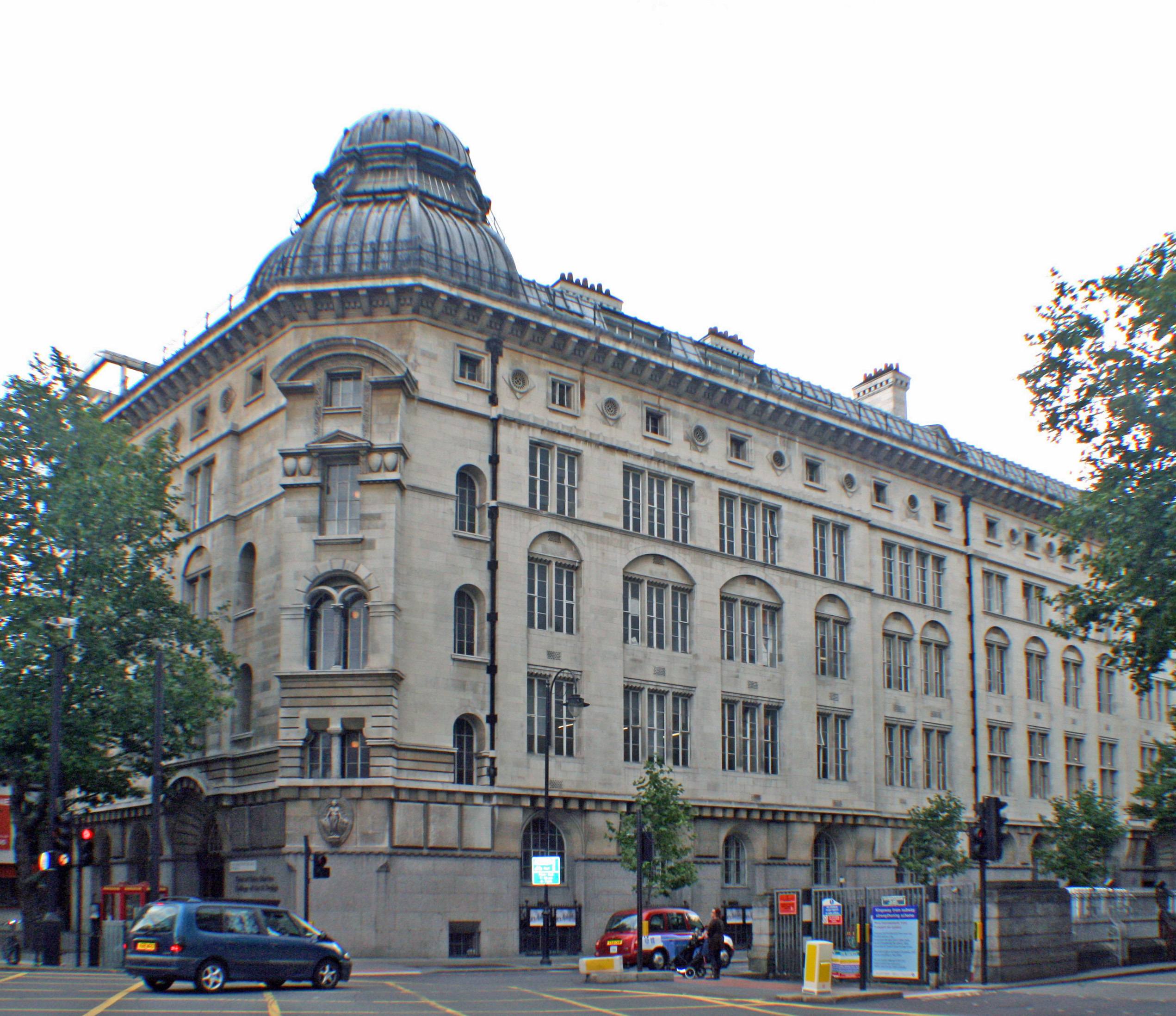
Central School of Art and Design, the venue for the World Chess Championship 2018

The Championship match between Magnus Carlsen and Fabiano Caruana was held from 9 to 28 November 2018 in London, United Kingdom, at the Cochrane Theatre of The College in Holborn.

=== Match regulations ===
The match was organised in a best-of-12-games format. The time control for the games was 100 minutes for the first 40 moves, an additional 50 minutes added after the 40th move, and then an additional 15 minutes added after the 60th move, plus an additional 30 seconds per move starting from move 1. Players were not permitted to agree to a draw before Black's 30th move.

The tie-breaking method consisted of the following schedule of faster games played on the final day in the following order, as necessary:

- Best-of-four rapid games (25 minutes for each player with an increment of 10 seconds after each move). The player with the best score after four rapid games is the winner. The players are not required to record the moves. In the match, Carlsen immediately won three games in a row, securing the championship.
- If the rapid games had been tied 2–2, up to five mini-matches of best-of-two blitz games (5 minutes plus 3 seconds increment after each move) would have been played. The player with the best score in any two-game blitz match would be the winner.
- If the blitz matches had failed to produce a winner, one sudden death "Armageddon" game: White receives 5 minutes and Black receives 4 minutes. Both players receive an increment of 3 seconds starting from move 61. The player who wins the drawing of lots may choose the colour. In case of a draw, the player with the black pieces is declared the winner.

=== Prize fund ===
The prize fund was 1 million euros net of all applicable taxes. Had the match been decided in the classical portion it would have been divided 60% vs 40% between winner and loser. As the match went to a tiebreak the split was more even at 55% vs 45%.

=== Previous head-to-head record ===
Prior to the match, Caruana and Carlsen had played 33 games against each other at classical time controls, of which Carlsen won 10 and Caruana 5, with 18 draws. The most recent game, during the 2018 Sinquefield Cup tournament, resulted in a draw.

Head-to-head record
		Carlsen wins	Draw	Caruana wins	Total
Classical	Carlsen (white) – Caruana (black)	5	10	2	17
Classical	Caruana (white) – Carlsen (black)	5	8	3	16
Classical	Total	10	18	5	33
Blitz / rapid / exhibition		13	4	6	23
Total		23	22	11	56

=== Alternative logo ===
2018 World Chess Championship alternative logo showing two figures with overlapping legs holding a chessboard in between with overlapping arms holding chess pieces

The World Chess Federation also showcased an "alternative logo", which depicts two figures with overlapping legs holding a chessboard. The image received controversy for appearing provocative and even "sexy". When the head of World Chess, Ilya Merenzon, was asked to speak on the topic, he said that "it's about two people fighting", but later added that "it would be nice to bring a little bit of sexual appeal into chess".

=== Organisation and location ===
The match was held under the auspices of FIDE, the world chess federation, with the organisation rights belonging to Agon, its commercial partner. Following the previous championship match in 2016, the president of FIDE, Kirsan Ilyumzhinov, said that the next venue would be in London or somewhere in Asia. Japan, South Korea and Singapore all said they were prepared to host the match. In November 2017, London was revealed as the host.

The Chief arbiter was Stéphane Escafre from France, and deputy arbiter was Nana Alexandria from Georgia. The appeal committee was composed of International Grandmasters and was chaired by Alexander Beliavsky (Slovenia) with Nigel Short (England) and Jóhann Hjartarson (Iceland) also present. The FIDE Supervisor was Ashot Vardapetyan, an International Arbiter from Armenia.

The match took place at The College in Holborn, Central London, an impressive Victorian building with a glass dome on the roof. The interior was refitted for the match to provide an elevated rectangular playing space that was to be sound-proof and set behind unidirectional glass so that the players were separated from the audience: the players could be seen, but they would not see the spectators who stood in near total darkness. To attend the event, ticket prices ranged from £45 to £100. It was also broadcast online, with IM Anna Rudolf and GM Judit Polgár providing commentary.

The first move of each game of the match was ceremonially performed by guests invited by the organisers. Among the guests were movie stars Woody Harrelson (who also made the first move in game one for the previous championship match in New York) and Tom Hollander; Ellisiv Reppen, partner of Jan Gustafsson, who was part of Carlsen's team in New York; Wikipedia founder Jimmy Wales; Sergey Karjakin, the previous challenger for the chess championship; Daniel Weil, the person who designed the pawn he moved, as well as the rest of pieces and the chessboard; and Lucy Hawking, daughter of physicist Stephen Hawking. For the first five minutes of actual game time, photographers were allowed to remain in the playing space to take photos.

=== Live analysis ===
The games were analysed live by the Sesse computer, running Stockfish. The computer featured a 20-core 2.3 GHz Haswell-EP CPU, which at the time was significantly more powerful than most personal computers.

=== Seconds ===
The seconds of the players were revealed after the match. Carlsen was helped by Peter Heine Nielsen, Laurent Fressinet, Daniil Dubov, Jan Gustafsson and Nils Grandelius. Caruana's seconds were Rustam Kasimdzhanov, Ioan-Cristian Chirila, Alejandro Ramirez and Leinier Domínguez.

=== Match preparation video leak ===
On 13 November 2018, a two-minute video showing Caruana's preparation for the match showing a list of openings, possibly revealing some of Caruana's opening preparation, was uploaded onto the Saint Louis Chess Club's YouTube channel. The video was quickly removed, but screenshots from the video were disseminated on the Internet. They revealed that Caruana's team was focusing on particular games, and openings—openings that deal primarily with how Caruana would defend as Black against 1.d4 or 1.e4; including variations of the Queen's Gambit Declined, Petrov's Defence, and the Grünfeld Defence with a fianchetto.

=== Schedule and results ===
Days with games are shaded.

Date	Event
Thursday 8 November	Opening ceremony
Friday 9 November	Game 1
Saturday 10 November	Game 2
Sunday 11 November	Rest day
Monday 12 November	Game 3
Tuesday 13 November	Game 4
Wednesday 14 November	Rest day
Thursday 15 November	Game 5
Friday 16 November	Game 6
Saturday 17 November	Rest day
Sunday 18 November	Game 7
Monday 19 November	Game 8
Tuesday 20 November	Rest day
Wednesday 21 November	Game 9
Thursday 22 November	Game 10
Friday 23 November	Rest day
Saturday 24 November	Game 11
Sunday 25 November	Rest day
Monday 26 November	Game 12
Tuesday 27 November	Rest day
Wednesday 28 November	Tie-break games
Thursday 29 November	Closing ceremony

The classical games began each day at 15:00 (local time and UTC) in London.

World Chess Championship 2018
	Rating	Match games												Points	Tiebreak games			Total
	Rating	1	2	3	4	5	6	7	8	9	10	11	12	Points	13	14	15	Total
Magnus Carlsen (NOR)	2835	½	½	½	½	½	½	½	½	½	½	½	½	6	1	1	1	9
Fabiano Caruana (USA)	2832	½	½	½	½	½	½	½	½	½	½	½	½	6	0	0	0	6

=== Classical games ===
==== Game 1: Caruana–Carlsen, ½–½ ====
Caruana–Carlsen, game 1

Position: c8 black king, g8 black rook, a7 black pawn, c7 black bishop, b6 black pawn, c6 black pawn, h6 black pawn, c5 black pawn, g5 black queen, e4 white pawn, f4 black pawn, b3 white pawn, d3 white pawn, f3 white queen, h3 white pawn, a2 white pawn, c2 white pawn, e2 white king, h2 white knight, f1 white rook

Position after 34.Nh2. Here Carlsen (black) would have had a winning position with 34...Qe5, infiltrating the queenside. Instead play continued 34...h5?! 35.Rf2 Qg1 36.Nf1 h4?! 37.Kd2? and now 37...Rg3! also was winning but not played.

The first game was a marathon draw, lasting 7 hours. At the time, it was the fourth longest game in a world championship, after Game 5 of the 1978 championship (124 moves), Game 7 of the 2014 championship (122 moves), and Game 14 of the 1908 championship (119 moves). (Since then, this has been surpassed by Game 6 of the 2021 championship, with 136 moves, making the game the fifth-longest World Championship game.) Caruana opened with 1.e4, and Carlsen responded with the Sicilian Defence, with Caruana playing the Rossolimo Variation, an opening with which he had lost against Carlsen in 2015. After 15 moves, it was clear that Carlsen had won the opening duel, with White having no clear way to improve his position while Black still had plans. Caruana started to consume a lot of time, but failed to neutralise Carlsen, with the result that Carlsen had a strong position after 30 moves and Caruana was in serious time trouble. Carlsen had a winning position several times between moves 34 and 40 but, despite a significant time advantage, failed each time to find the winning continuation, and after 40...Bxc3? Caruana was able to reach a drawn endgame. Carlsen continued to play for a win but Caruana was able to hold the game, despite being a pawn down in a rook endgame. The players finally agreed to a draw after 115 moves.

Sicilian Defence, Rossolimo Variation (ECO B31)
1. e4 c5 2. Nf3 Nc6 3. Bb5 g6 4. Bxc6 dxc6 5. d3 Bg7 6. h3 Nf6 7. Nc3 Nd7 8. Be3 e5 9. 0-0 b6 10. Nh2 Nf8 11. f4 exf4 12. Rxf4 Be6 13. Rf2 h6 14. Qd2 g5 15. Raf1 Qd6 16. Ng4 0-0-0 17. Nf6 Nd7 18. Nh5 Be5 19. g4 f6 20. b3 Bf7 21. Nd1 Nf8 22. Nxf6 Ne6 23. Nh5 Bxh5 24. gxh5 Nf4 25. Bxf4 gxf4 26. Rg2 Rhg8 27. Qe2 Rxg2+ 28. Qxg2 Qe6 29. Nf2 Rg8 30. Ng4 Qe8 31. Qf3 Qxh5 32. Kf2 Bc7 33. Ke2 Qg5 34. Nh2 (diagram) h5 35. Rf2 Qg1 36. Nf1 h4 37. Kd2 Kb7 38. c3 Be5 39. Kc2 Qg7 40. Nh2 Bxc3 41. Qxf4 Bd4 42. Qf7+ Ka6 43. Qxg7 Rxg7 44. Re2 Rg3 45. Ng4 Rxh3 46. e5 Rf3 47. e6 Rf8 48. e7 Re8 49. Nh6 h3 50. Nf5 Bf6 51. a3 b5 52. b4 cxb4 53. axb4 Bxe7 54. Nxe7 h2 55. Rxh2 Rxe7 56. Rh6 Kb6 57. Kc3 Rd7 58. Rg6 Kc7 59. Rh6 Rd6 60. Rh8 Rg6 61. Ra8 Kb7 62. Rh8 Rg5 63. Rh7+ Kb6 64. Rh6 Rg1 65. Kc2 Rf1 66. Rg6 Rh1 67. Rf6 Rh8 68. Kc3 Ra8 69. d4 Rd8 70. Rh6 Rd7 71. Rg6 Kc7 72. Rg5 Rd6 73. Rg8 Rh6 74. Ra8 Rh3+ 75. Kc2 Ra3 76. Kb2 Ra4 77. Kc3 a6 78. Rh8 Ra3+ 79. Kb2 Rg3 80. Kc2 Rg5 81. Rh6 Rd5 82. Kc3 Rd6 83. Rh8 Rg6 84. Kc2 Kb7 85. Kc3 Rg3+ 86. Kc2 Rg1 87. Rh5 Rg2+ 88. Kc3 Rg3+ 89. Kc2 Rg4 90. Kc3 Kb6 91. Rh6 Rg5 92. Rf6 Rh5 93. Rg6 Rh3+ 94. Kc2 Rh5 95. Kc3 Rd5 96. Rh6 Kc7 97. Rh7+ Rd7 98. Rh5 Rd6 99. Rh8 Rg6 100. Rf8 Rg3+ 101. Kc2 Ra3 102. Rf7+ Kd6 103. Ra7 Kd5 104. Kb2 Rd3 105. Rxa6 Rxd4 106. Kb3 Re4 107. Kc3 Rc4+ 108. Kb3 Kd4 109. Rb6 Kd3 110. Ra6 Rc2 111. Rb6 Rc3+ 112. Kb2 Rc4 113. Kb3 Kd4 114. Ra6 Kd5 115. Ra8 ½–½

==== Game 2: Carlsen–Caruana, ½–½ ====
Carlsen–Caruana, game 2

Position: a8 black rook, c8 black bishop, d8 black rook, g8 black king, a7 black pawn, b7 black pawn, f7 black pawn, g7 black pawn, d6 black bishop, e6 black pawn, h6 black pawn, a5 black queen, d5 black knight, e5 white knight, a4 white pawn, f4 white bishop, c3 white pawn, e3 white pawn, c2 white queen, e2 white bishop, f2 white pawn, g2 white pawn, h2 white pawn, d1 white rook, f1 white rook, g1 white king

Position after 16...Nxd5. Here, Carlsen (white) could have played aggressively with the temporary knight sacrifice 17.Nxf7, after which 17...Kxf7 18.Bxd6 Rxd6 19.Bh5+ Kg8 20.e4 would have recovered material, though neither player thought it offered White an advantage.

Game 2 began as a Queen's Gambit Declined with Caruana opting for the rarely played 10...Rd8. Caught by surprise, Carlsen avoided the most critical continuation and soon found himself far behind on the clock, a reversal of fortunes from Game 1. Caruana had the clearly-better position, but Carlsen was able to "beg for a draw", successfully navigating to a drawn pawn-down rook endgame. The game was drawn by agreement after 49 moves.

Queen's Gambit Declined, Harrwitz Attack (ECO D37)
1. d4 Nf6 2. Nf3 d5 3. c4 e6 4. Nc3 Be7 5. Bf4 0-0 6. e3 c5 7. dxc5 Bxc5 8. Qc2 Nc6 9. a3 Qa5 10. Rd1 Rd8 11. Be2 Ne4 12. 0-0 Nxc3 13. bxc3 h6 14. a4 Ne7 15. Ne5 Bd6 16. cxd5 Nxd5 (diagram) 17. Bf3 Nxf4 18. exf4 Bxe5 19. Rxd8+ Qxd8 20. fxe5 Qc7 21. Rb1 Rb8 22. Qd3 Bd7 23. a5 Bc6 24. Qd6 Qxd6 25. exd6 Bxf3 26. gxf3 Kf8 27. c4 Ke8 28. a6 b6 29. c5 Kd7 30. cxb6 axb6 31. a7 Ra8 32. Rxb6 Rxa7 33. Kg2 e5 34. Rb4 f5 35. Rb6 Ke6 36. d7+ Kxd7 37. Rb5 Ke6 38. Rb6+ Kf7 39. Rb5 Kf6 40. Rb6+ Kg5 41. Rb5 Kf4 42. Rb4+ e4 43. fxe4 fxe4 44. h3 Ra5 45. Rb7 Rg5+ 46. Kf1 Rg6 47. Rb4 Rg5 48. Rb7 Rg6 49. Rb4 ½–½

==== Game 3: Caruana–Carlsen, ½–½ ====
Caruana–Carlsen, game 3

Position: f8 black rook, g8 black king, b7 black pawn, c7 black queen, f7 black pawn, g7 black bishop, h7 black pawn, c6 black pawn, f6 black knight, g6 black pawn, a5 black rook, e5 black pawn, e4 white pawn, d3 white pawn, f3 white knight, h3 white pawn, c2 white pawn, f2 white pawn, g2 white pawn, a1 white rook, c1 white bishop, d1 white queen, e1 white rook, g1 white king

Position after 14...Rxa5. Here, Caruana (white) could have exchanged the first pair of rooks with 15.Rxa5 Qxa5 16.Bd2 Qc7 17.Qa1 and begun to apply pressure on the queenside. The position would have become slightly more unpleasant for Carlsen.

Game 3 was a 49-move draw, beginning again with the Rossolimo Variation of the Sicilian Defence. Caruana deviated first with 6.0-0, against which Carlsen chose a rare continuation. White maintained some pressure, but it was not serious. On move 15 Caruana suffered a "blackout" and played Bd2, missing that Black does not have to exchange rooks. This lost all the White pressure, and a few moves later with neither side having any concrete plan, Caruana exchanged all the major pieces and went into a slightly inferior endgame, where Black possessed a bishop for White's knight as well as a slight space advantage. Carlsen tried, but Caruana was never in real danger of losing.

Sicilian Defence, Rossolimo Variation (ECO B31)
1. e4 c5 2. Nf3 Nc6 3. Bb5 g6 4. Bxc6 dxc6 5. d3 Bg7 6. 0-0 Qc7 7. Re1 e5 8. a3 Nf6 9. b4 0-0 10. Nbd2 Bg4 11. h3 Bxf3 12. Nxf3 cxb4 13. axb4 a5 14. bxa5 Rxa5 (diagram) 15. Bd2 Raa8 16. Qb1 Nd7 17. Qb4 Rfe8 18. Bc3 b5 19. Rxa8 Rxa8 20. Ra1 Rxa1+ 21. Bxa1 Qa7 22. Bc3 Qa2 23. Qb2 Qxb2 24. Bxb2 f6 25. Kf1 Kf7 26. Ke2 Nc5 27. Bc3 Ne6 28. g3 Bf8 29. Nd2 Ng5 30. h4 Ne6 31. Nb3 h5 32. Bd2 Bd6 33. c3 c5 34. Be3 Ke7 35. Kd1 Kd7 36. Kc2 f5 37. Kd1 fxe4 38. dxe4 c4 39. Nd2 Nc5 40. Bxc5 Bxc5 41. Ke2 Kc6 42. Nf1 b4 43. cxb4 Bxb4 44. Ne3 Kc5 45. f4 exf4 46. gxf4 Ba5 47. f5 gxf5 48. Nxc4 Kxc4 49. exf5 ½–½

==== Game 4: Carlsen–Caruana, ½–½ ====
Carlsen–Caruana, game 4

Position: a8 black rook, c8 black bishop, d8 black queen, e8 black rook, g8 black king, b7 black pawn, f7 black pawn, g7 black pawn, h7 black pawn, a6 black pawn, c6 black pawn, d6 black bishop, e5 black pawn, a4 white pawn, b4 white pawn, c3 white bishop, d3 white pawn, f3 white bishop, g3 white pawn, e2 white pawn, f2 white pawn, h2 white pawn, b1 white rook, d1 white queen, f1 white rook, g1 white king

Position after 14...c6. White is in the midst of a queenside minority attack, and this was his only chance to play 15.b5 before Black stops it with ...Bd7. Carlsen may have been concerned about 15.b5 cxb5 16.axb5 a5, giving Black a passed pawn. GM Sam Shankland felt that White's position is more comfortable, but that after 17.Qa4 Qe7 18.Rfc1 Bf5! intending ...e4 with piece exchanges, a draw is still the most likely result.

Game 4 was a 34-move draw that began with the English Opening, Four Knights, Kingside Fianchetto variation. Carlsen came up with the first new move, 11.b4, but Caruana was prepared with the immediate rejoinder 11...Bd6. Several logical moves later Carlsen had the opportunity to create an imbalanced position with 15.b5, but declined (see diagram). After 15...Bd7 stopping the pawn break, it became difficult for either side to come up with concrete plans, and the game was soon drawn. This was only the second time Carlsen opened with c4 in a world championship match, the first being a victory against Viswanathan Anand in game 5 of the 2013 World Chess Championship.

English Opening, Four Knights, Kingside Fianchetto (ECO A29)
1. c4 e5 2. Nc3 Nf6 3. Nf3 Nc6 4. g3 d5 5. cxd5 Nxd5 6. Bg2 Bc5 7. 0-0 0-0 8. d3 Re8 9. Bd2 Nxc3 10. Bxc3 Nd4 11. b4 Bd6 12. Rb1 Nxf3+ 13. Bxf3 a6 14. a4 c6 (diagram) 15. Re1 Bd7 16. e3 Qf6 17. Be4 Bf5 18. Qf3 Bxe4 19. Qxf6 gxf6 20. dxe4 b5 21. Red1 Bf8 22. axb5 axb5 23. Kg2 Red8 24. Rdc1 Kg7 25. Be1 Rdc8 26. Rc2 Ra4 27. Kf3 h5 28. Ke2 Kg6 29. h3 f5 30. exf5+ Kxf5 31. f3 Be7 32. e4+ Ke6 33. Bd2 Bd6 34. Rbc1 ½–½

==== Game 5: Caruana–Carlsen, ½–½ ====
Caruana–Carlsen, game 5

Position: c8 black bishop, e8 black king, h8 black rook, b7 black pawn, e7 black knight, f7 black pawn, g7 black bishop, h7 black pawn, d6 black pawn, g6 black pawn, a5 black queen, c5 white pawn, e5 black pawn, b4 black pawn, c4 white queen, e4 white pawn, f3 white knight, c2 white pawn, d2 white pawn, f2 white pawn, g2 white pawn, h2 white pawn, a1 white bishop, e1 white rook, g1 white king

Position after 13...Qa5. Carlsen had many ways to go wrong earlier, but had successfully avoided all the traps and now initiates a forced line that leads to a comfortable endgame for Black.

Game 5 was a 34-move draw, beginning once again with the Rossolimo Variation of the Sicilian Defence. This time play transitioned to the little-used Gurgenidze variation, which was prepared by Caruana before this match began, forcing Carlsen to spend a lot of time thinking early on. In fact, the variation with 7...a6 was last played at the top level in 2007. It was not until 13. ...Qa5 that Caruana began to seriously think about his next move. Although Caruana had caught Carlsen in his preparation, Carlsen navigated the complications accurately, and emerged not only unscathed, but with a slightly superior position. Nonetheless, Caruana was able to defend without many problems, and the players agreed to a draw after the 34th move.

Sicilian Defence, Rossolimo Variation (ECO B31)
1. e4 c5 2. Nf3 Nc6 3. Bb5 g6 4. 0-0 Bg7 5. Re1 e5 6. b4 Nxb4 7. Bb2 a6 8. a3 axb5 9. axb4 Rxa1 10. Bxa1 d6 11. bxc5 Ne7 12. Qe2 b4 13. Qc4 Qa5 (diagram) 14. cxd6 Be6 15. Qc7 Qxc7 16. dxc7 Nc6 17. c3 Kd7 18. cxb4 Ra8 19. Bc3 Kxc7 20. d3 Kb6 21. Bd2 Rd8 22. Be3+ Kb5 23. Nc3+ Kxb4 24. Nd5+ Bxd5 25. exd5 Rxd5 26. Rb1+ Kc3 27. Rxb7 Nd8 28. Rc7+ Kxd3 29. Kf1 h5 30. h3 Ke4 31. Ng5+ Kf5 32. Nxf7 Nxf7 33. Rxf7+ Bf6 34. g4+ ½–½

==== Game 6: Carlsen–Caruana, ½–½ ====
Carlsen–Caruana, game 6

Position: f8 black king, f6 black pawn, g6 white king, d5 white bishop, f5 white pawn, h5 white pawn, d4 black knight, d2 black bishop

Position after 67.Kg6?. Engine analysis shows a forced mate in 58 beginning with 67...Bg5 68.Bc4 Bh4!! 69.Bd5 Ne2 70.Bf3 Ng1!!. The idea is that White will eventually be zugzwanged to advance his h-pawn, which places it on a dark square. This exposes it to attack by Black's bishop, allowing Black to win it by force. The variation was so subtle that Garry Kasparov wrote that no human could have found it, though Caruana's second Rustam Kasimdzhanov disagreed.

Game 6 was an 80-move draw. Carlsen began with 1.e4, while Caruana defended with the Petrov Defence, one of his favourite openings. Both players blitzed out the opening, reaching a dry and drawish middlegame. However, Carlsen played somewhat carelessly and Caruana was able to sharpen the position by opening the center. By move 26 it was apparent that Black was for choice. Carlsen defended by giving up a knight for three pawns, two of which were connected passed pawns on the queenside, and forced an opposite-color bishops endgame. Caruana was able to take one of the pawns, but Carlsen had strong counterplay and it was unclear how Caruana could make progress. On move 67 Carlsen made a subtle error that allowed Caruana a forced mate in 58 moves, found by engines. However, the line was subtle and difficult to find. Grandmasters had trouble explaining the idea after the game: Garry Kasparov wrote that no human could have found it, although Caruana's second Rustam Kasimdzhanov wrote: "Maybe the move was indeed difficult to see. But it was not impossible. However, to find such a move you have to believe that you can win this endgame. And even if it is objectively drawn you can still try some tricks". After this last opportunity Carlsen made no further mistakes and held the draw.

Petrov's Defence, Karklins-Martinovsky Variation (ECO C42)
1. e4 e5 2. Nf3 Nf6 3. Nxe5 d6 4. Nd3 Nxe4 5. Qe2 Qe7 6. Nf4 Nc6 7. Nd5 Nd4 8. Nxe7 Nxe2 9. Nd5 Nd4 10. Na3 Ne6 11. f3 N4c5 12. d4 Nd7 13. c3 c6 14. Nf4 Nb6 15. Bd3 d5 16. Nc2 Bd6 17. Nxe6 Bxe6 18. Kf2 h5 19. h4 Nc8 20. Ne3 Ne7 21. g3 c5 22. Bc2 0-0 23. Rd1 Rfd8 24. Ng2 cxd4 25. cxd4 Rac8 26. Bb3 Nc6 27. Bf4 Na5 28. Rdc1 Bb4 29. Bd1 Nc4 30. b3 Na3 31. Rxc8 Rxc8 32. Rc1 Nb5 33. Rxc8+ Bxc8 34. Ne3 Nc3 35. Bc2 Ba3 36. Bb8 a6 37. f4 Bd7 38. f5 Bc6 39. Bd1 Bb2 40. Bxh5 Ne4+ 41. Kg2 Bxd4 42. Bf4 Bc5 43. Bf3 Nd2 44. Bxd5 Bxe3 45. Bxc6 Bxf4 46. Bxb7 Bd6 47. Bxa6 Ne4 48. g4 Ba3 49. Bc4 Kf8 50. g5 Nc3 51. b4 Bxb4 52. Kf3 Na4 53. Bb5 Nc5 54. a4 f6 55. Kg4 Ne4 56. Kh5 Be1 57. Bd3 Nd6 58. a5 Bxa5 59. gxf6 gxf6 60. Kg6 Bd8 61. Kh7 Nf7 62. Bc4 Ne5 63. Bd5 Ba5 64. h5 Bd2 65. Ba2 Nf3 66. Bd5 Nd4 67. Kg6 (diagram) Bg5 68. Bc4 Nf3 69. Kh7 Ne5 70. Bb3 Ng4 71. Bc4 Ne3 72. Bd3 Ng4 73. Bc4 Nh6 74. Kg6 Ke7 75. Bb3 Kd6 76. Bc2 Ke5 77. Bd3 Kf4 78. Bc2 Ng4 79. Bb3 Ne3 80. h6 Bxh6 ½–½

==== Game 7: Carlsen–Caruana, ½–½ ====
Carlsen–Caruana, game 7

Position: a8 black rook, c8 black bishop, f8 black rook, g8 black king, a7 black pawn, b7 black pawn, e7 black queen, f7 black pawn, g7 black pawn, h7 black pawn, b6 black bishop, e6 black pawn, f6 black knight, e5 black knight, g5 white bishop, c4 black pawn, a3 white pawn, c3 white knight, e3 white pawn, b2 white pawn, c2 white queen, d2 white knight, e2 white bishop, f2 white pawn, g2 white pawn, h2 white pawn, a1 white rook, e1 white king, h1 white rook

Position after 14...Ne5. White has the chance to push forward with 15.Nce4, but after 15...Bd7, it is not easy for White to recapture the c4-pawn since 16.Nxc4 Rfc8 gives Black's pieces enough activity that White still has no advantage.

For Game 7, Carlsen once again had the white pieces (the order switched at the halfway point) and he repeated the Queen's Gambit Declined of game 2. The first nine moves followed game 2, until Carlsen deviated with 10.Nd2. However, Caruana was well-prepared and had his counter ready. Carlsen temporarily sacrificed a pawn to exert some pressure on the Black kingside, but when the opportunity arose to open the game with 15.Nce4 (diagram) – which would have compromised Black's king position but made it awkward to recapture the sacrificed pawn – he didn't sufficiently believe in his position to press ahead. Carlsen later said that playing 15.0-0 was an admission that White had no advantage. After White recaptured the sacrificed pawn the position was symmetrical. Carlsen made some attempt to win the game, but although he was able to establish an outpost for his knight on d6, he had to trade every other piece to achieve it, and the game fizzled to a draw on move 40.

Queen's Gambit Declined, Harrwitz Attack (ECO D37)
1. d4 Nf6 2. Nf3 d5 3. c4 e6 4. Nc3 Be7 5. Bf4 0-0 6. e3 c5 7. dxc5 Bxc5 8. Qc2 Nc6 9. a3 Qa5 10. Nd2 Qd8 11. Nb3 Bb6 12. Be2 Qe7 13. Bg5 dxc4 14. Nd2 Ne5 (diagram) 15. 0-0 Bd7 16. Bf4 Ng6 17. Bg3 Bc6 18. Nxc4 Bc7 19. Rfd1 Rfd8 20. Rxd8+ Rxd8 21. Rd1 Rxd1+ 22. Qxd1 Nd5 23. Qd4 Nxc3 24. Qxc3 Bxg3 25. hxg3 Qd7 26. Bd3 b6 27. f3 Bb7 28. Bxg6 hxg6 29. e4 Qc7 30. e5 Qc5+ 31. Kh2 Ba6 32. Nd6 Qxc3 33. bxc3 f6 34. f4 Kf8 35. Kg1 Ke7 36. Kf2 Kd7 37. Ke3 Bf1 38. Kf2 Ba6 39. Ke3 Bf1 40. Kf2 ½–½

==== Game 8: Caruana–Carlsen, ½–½ ====
Caruana–Carlsen, game 8

Position: b8 black rook, d8 black queen, f8 black rook, g8 black king, b7 black pawn, h7 black pawn, a6 black pawn, b6 white knight, d6 black bishop, a5 white pawn, c5 black pawn, d5 white pawn, f5 black bishop, g5 black pawn, f4 black pawn, c3 white bishop, f3 white queen, b2 white pawn, g2 white pawn, h2 white pawn, d1 white rook, f1 white rook, g1 white king

Position after 23...Bd6. White can continue a promising attack with 24.Nc4 or 24.Qh5. However, White played 24.h3? which was too slow and allowed Black to mount an effective defence beginning with 24...Qe8! The queen manoeuvres to g6, guarding both the h5- and d6-squares and stopping all of White's attacking ideas.

In Game 8 Caruana had the white pieces and once again opened with 1.e4. Just like the other three games before in this situation, Carlsen responded with the Sicilian Defence. Unlike the previous three games, Caruana played an Open Sicilian. Carlsen responded with the Sveshnikov Variation.

By move 20 the position was very open and sharp with Black's king feeling a little exposed. Caruana found the very good 21.c5!, sacrificing a pawn to further open the center and create a passed d-pawn. Engine analysis showed this position to be winning for White. Unfortunately for Caruana, 23.Rad1 was a little too slow for this position (23.Rae1 seizing the open e-file immediately was preferred) and 24.h3? gave away all of his advantage. Four-time U.S. champion Hikaru Nakamura reacted immediately and negatively to 24.h3, with disapproving facial expressions and harsh comments that he didn't like the move at all. Eight-time Russian champion and chess commentator Peter Svidler was also shocked by the move, suggesting this move was an attempt by White to deny Black any counterplay by preventing him from advancing his g-pawn, but engine analysis showed the position to be equal after Carlsen responded with 24...Qe8. Caruana soon realised that he had lost his advantage, and forced a draw before Black's bishop pair and extra pawn could make an impact. Play eventually ended after 38 moves in a draw after 3 hours and 43 minutes of play, with equal material and Caruana unable to promote his passed d-pawn.

Sicilian Defence, Sveshnikov Variation (ECO B33)
1. e4 c5 2. Nf3 Nc6 3. d4 cxd4 4. Nxd4 Nf6 5. Nc3 e5 6. Ndb5 d6 7. Nd5 Nxd5 8. exd5 Nb8 9. a4 Be7 10. Be2 0-0 11. 0-0 Nd7 12. Bd2 f5 13. a5 a6 14. Na3 e4 15. Nc4 Ne5 16. Nb6 Rb8 17. f4 exf3 18. Bxf3 g5 19. c4 f4 20. Bc3 Bf5 21. c5 Nxf3+ 22. Qxf3 dxc5 23. Rad1 Bd6 (diagram) 24. h3 Qe8 25. Nc4 Qg6 26. Nxd6 Qxd6 27. h4 gxh4 28. Qxf4 Qxf4 29. Rxf4 h5 30. Re1 Bg4 31. Rf6 Rxf6 32. Bxf6 Kf7 33. Bxh4 Re8 34. Rf1+ Kg8 35. Rf6 Re2 36. Rg6+ Kf8 37. d6 Rd2 38. Rg5 ½–½

==== Game 9: Carlsen–Caruana, ½–½ ====
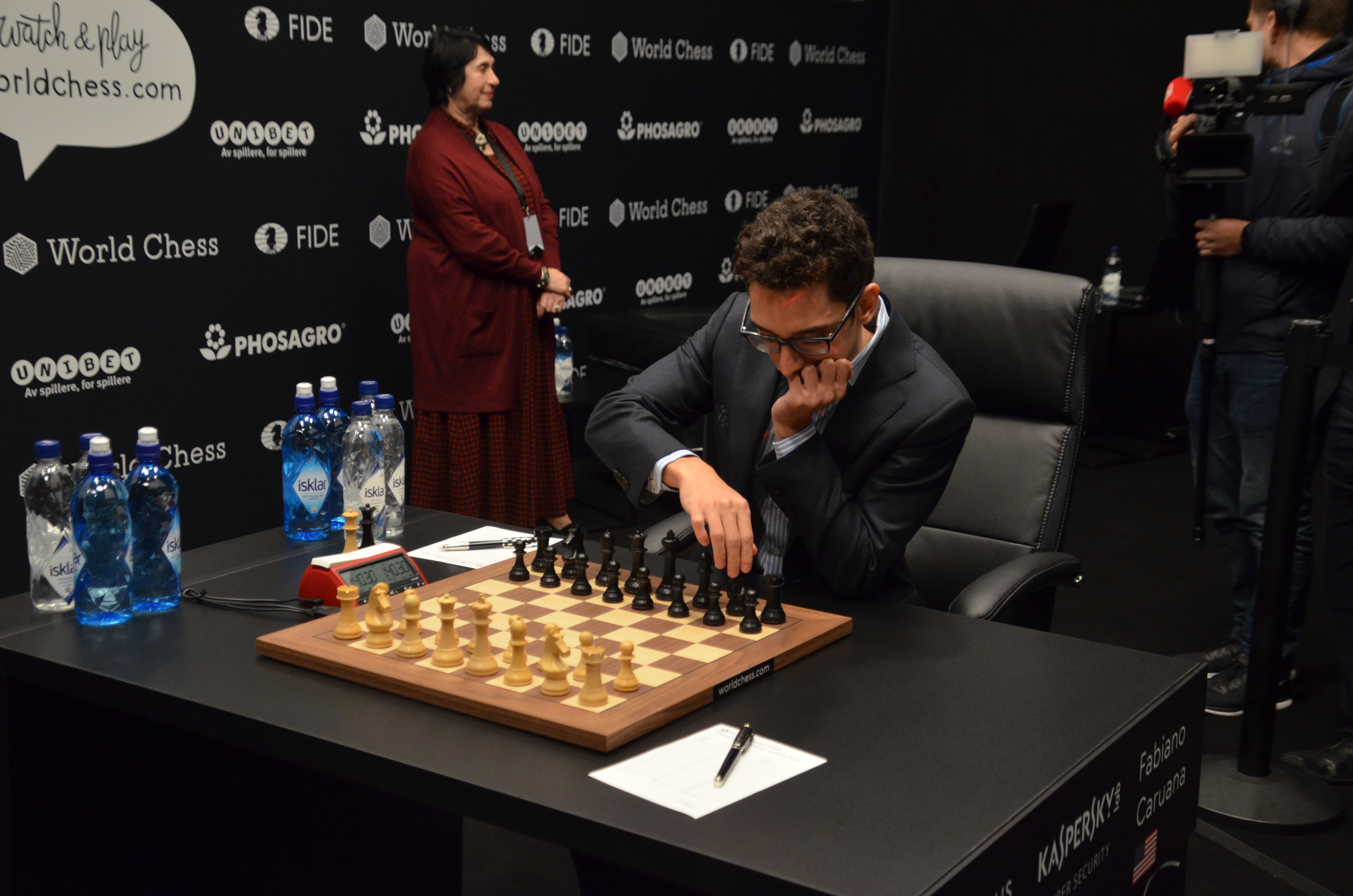
Fabiano Caruana during game 9

Carlsen–Caruana, game 9

Position: d8 black rook, e8 black rook, h8 black king, a7 black pawn, b7 white bishop, c7 black pawn, e7 black queen, h7 black pawn, b6 black bishop, f6 black pawn, g6 black pawn, h4 white pawn, b3 white queen, e3 white pawn, g3 white pawn, a2 white pawn, f2 white pawn, d1 white rook, f1 white rook, g1 white king

Position after 24...g6. White enjoys a positional advantage and can continue a slow buildup of pressure with 25.Bc6, 25.Bf3 or 25.Kg2, although Black might still be able to set up a fortress with ...h5, ...f5, ...Kg7 and ...Qf6. Instead, White rushed to break open Black's kingside with 25.h5? This move allowed Black the surprising resource of 25...gxh5! 26.Qc4 f5! 27.Bf3 h4! Now White's king was also exposed, and the game proceeded to rook and queen exchanges and a drawn opposite-coloured bishops ending.

Game 9 began with the English Opening, Four Knights, Kingside Fianchetto variation, following Game 4 until Carlsen deviated with 9.Bg5. Although Black's position was not terrible, it soon became clear that White had much easier plans and Black didn't have much counterplay. As a result, Caruana played the exchange 17...Bxf3?! Sesse gave Carlsen a +0.75 advantage after this move, which was also criticised by human commentators such as U.S. grandmaster Robert Hess. However, both Caruana and Carlsen later defended the move. While it leads to a lasting and comfortable White advantage, Black manages to simplify the position, as well as gains the chance to reach an opposite-coloured bishops endgame.

After the exchanges, White had good attacking chances, thanks to a safer king and opposite-coloured bishops. Carlsen advanced his h-pawn, trying to pry open Black's king position. However, 25.h5? was too hasty, and Caruana responded with 25...gxh5! followed by pawn thrusts 26...f5! and 27...h4! that also exposed White's king. Black now had enough counterplay and the two players exchanged off rooks and queens into a drawn opposite-coloured bishops endgame. Carlsen kept playing on but there was never any realistic hope for a win unless Caruana blundered catastrophically. With this draw, the match set a new record for most consecutive draws to begin a World Championship match. The 1995 Classical match began with eight consecutive draws before Viswanathan Anand broke through against Garry Kasparov for a win.

English Opening, Four Knights, Kingside Fianchetto (ECO A29)
1. c4 e5 2. Nc3 Nf6 3. Nf3 Nc6 4. g3 d5 5. cxd5 Nxd5 6. Bg2 Bc5 7. 0-0 0-0 8. d3 Re8 9. Bg5 Nxc3 10. bxc3 f6 11. Bc1 Be6 12. Bb2 Bb6 13. d4 Bd5 14. Qc2 exd4 15. cxd4 Be4 16. Qb3+ Bd5 17. Qd1 Bxf3 18. Qb3+ Kh8 19. Bxf3 Nxd4 20. Bxd4 Qxd4 21. e3 Qe5 22. Bxb7 Rad8 23. Rad1 Qe7 24. h4 g6 (diagram) 25. h5 gxh5 26. Qc4 f5 27. Bf3 h4 28. Rxd8 Rxd8 29. gxh4 Rg8+ 30. Kh1 Qf6 31. Qf4 Bc5 32. Rg1 Rxg1+ 33. Kxg1 Bd6 34. Qa4 f4 35. Qxa7 fxe3 36. Qxe3 Qxh4 37. a4 Qf6 38. Bd1 Qe5 39. Qxe5+ Bxe5 40. a5 Kg7 41. a6 Bd4 42. Kg2 Kf6 43. f4 Bb6 44. Kf3 h6 45. Ke4 Ba7 46. Bg4 Bg1 47. Kd5 Bb6 48. Kc6 Be3 49. Kb7 Bb6 50. Bh3 Be3 51. Kc6 Bb6 52. Kd5 Ba7 53. Ke4 Bb6 54. Bf1 Ke6 55. Bc4+ Kf6 56. Bd3 Ke6 ½–½

==== Game 10: Caruana–Carlsen, ½–½ ====
Caruana–Carlsen, game 10

Position: a8 black rook, c8 black bishop, f8 black rook, g8 black king, c7 white bishop, d7 black knight, e7 black bishop, g7 black pawn, h7 black pawn, d6 black pawn, g6 black queen, a5 white pawn, b5 black pawn, d5 white pawn, c4 white knight, e4 black pawn, f4 black pawn, a3 white rook, c2 white pawn, e2 white bishop, f2 white pawn, g2 white pawn, h2 white pawn, d1 white queen, f1 white rook, h1 white king

Position after 21...b5! Black has a menacing number of pieces and pawns lined up against White's king. If White plays 22.axb6 e.p., Black trades rooks and removes a defender of the f3-square for a later f3 pawn thrust. Although not necessarily winning, the attack is psychologically frightening.

This game began with the Sveshnikov Variation of the Sicilian Defence, and followed Game 8 until Caruana deviated with 12.b4. The game entered a complicated middlegame where both sides had a lot of possibilities, and then became even more complicated when Carlsen played 21...b5! Both sides took risks and it was possible that either side could win, with Black launching a strong kingside attack while White gained a passed pawn on the queenside, a potential endgame trump if he survives the attack. Carlsen was able to force Caruana to weaken his king position, but was not able to break through the pawn shield. Although the attack failed, Carlsen had forced White's pieces to passive squares, and was able to neutralise White's passed b-pawn as a result. After Carlsen liquidated the b-pawn, Caruana emerged with an extra pawn in the endgame, but there were too few pawns remaining for White to hope to break through.

Caruana's second Rustam Kasimdzhanov later revealed that Caruana had forgotten his preparation in this game.

Sicilian Defence, Sveshnikov Variation (ECO B33)
1. e4 c5 2. Nf3 Nc6 3. d4 cxd4 4. Nxd4 Nf6 5. Nc3 e5 6. Ndb5 d6 7. Nd5 Nxd5 8. exd5 Nb8 9. a4 Be7 10. Be2 0-0 11. 0-0 Nd7 12. b4 a6 13. Na3 a5 14. bxa5 Rxa5 15. Nc4 Ra8 16. Be3 f5 17. a5 f4 18. Bb6 Qe8 19. Ra3 Qg6 20. Bc7 e4 21. Kh1 b5 (diagram) 22. Nb6 Nxb6 23. Bxb6 Qg5 24. g3 b4 25. Rb3 Bh3 26. Rg1 f3 27. Bf1 Bxf1 28. Qxf1 Qxd5 29. Rxb4 Qe6 30. Rb5 Bd8 31. Qe1 Bxb6 32. axb6 Rab8 33. Qe3 Qc4 34. Rb2 Rb7 35. Rd1 Qe2 36.Re1 Qxe3 37.Rxe3 d5 38.h4 Rc8 39.Ra3 Kf7 40.Kh2 Ke6 41.g4 Rc6 42.Ra6 Ke5 43.Kg3 h6 44.h5 Kd4 45.Rb5 Rd6 46.Ra4+ Ke5 47.Rab4 Ke6 48.c4 dxc4 49. Rxc4 Rdxb6 50. Rxe4+ Kf7 51. Rf5+ Rf6 52. Rxf6+ Kxf6 53. Kxf3 Kf7 54. Kg3 ½–½

==== Game 11: Carlsen–Caruana, ½–½ ====
Carlsen–Caruana, game 11

Position: a8 black rook, g8 black king, a7 black pawn, b7 black pawn, e7 black rook, f7 black pawn, g7 black pawn, d6 black pawn, e6 black bishop, h6 black pawn, c5 black pawn, e5 black knight, c4 white pawn, d3 white bishop, a2 white pawn, b2 white pawn, c2 white pawn, d2 white bishop, e2 white rook, f2 white pawn, g2 white pawn, h2 white pawn, b1 white king, d1 white rook

Position after 18...Ne5! White has no way to avoid the opposite-coloured bishop endgame, which also kills all his winning chances.

Carlsen opened with e4 for the second time in the match, with Caruana once again playing Petrov's Defence. Caruana was very well prepared, and Carlsen was unable to get an opening advantage, despite the fact that the variation with 9...Nf6 had been visible in Caruana's leaked opening preparation video 11 days earlier. After an early queen trade, Caruana forced an opposite-coloured bishops endgame with 18...Ne5! After further liquidating the d6-pawn, his only weakness, Caruana even had the liberty to give up a pawn. Carlsen kept playing, but his only chance to win was for Caruana to blunder, which he did not. The game was drawn in 55 moves.

Petrov's Defence, Nimzowitsch Attack (ECO C42)
1. e4 e5 2. Nf3 Nf6 3. Nxe5 d6 4. Nf3 Nxe4 5. Nc3 Nxc3 6. dxc3 Be7 7. Be3 0-0 8. Qd2 Nd7 9. 0-0-0 Nf6 10. Bd3 c5 11. Rhe1 Be6 12. Kb1 Qa5 13. c4 Qxd2 14. Bxd2 h6 15. Nh4 Rfe8 16. Ng6 Ng4 17. Nxe7+ Rxe7 18. Re2 Ne5 (diagram) 19. Bf4 Nxd3 20. Rxd3 Rd7 21. Rxd6 Rxd6 22. Bxd6 Rd8 23. Rd2 Bxc4 24. Kc1 b6 25. Bf4 Rxd2 26. Kxd2 a6 27. a3 Kf8 28. Bc7 b5 29. Bd6+ Ke8 30. Bxc5 h5 31. Ke3 Kd7 32. Kd4 g6 33. g3 Be2 34. Bf8 Kc6 35. b3 Bd1 36. Kd3 Bg4 37. c4 Be6 38. Kd4 bxc4 39. bxc4 Bg4 40. c5 Be6 41. Bh6 Bd5 42. Be3 Be6 43. Ke5 Bd5 44. Kf4 Be6 45. Kg5 Bd5 46. g4 hxg4 47. Kxg4 Ba2 48. Kg5 Bb3 49. Kf6 Ba2 50. h4 Bb3 51. f4 Ba2 52. Ke7 Bb3 53. Kf6 Ba2 54. f5 Bb1 55. Bf2 Bc2 ½–½

==== Game 12: Caruana–Carlsen, ½–½ ====
Caruana–Carlsen, game 12

Position: c8 black rook, e8 black bishop, f8 black rook, g8 black king, b7 black pawn, c7 black queen, g7 black pawn, d6 black pawn, f6 black bishop, a5 black pawn, c5 black knight, d5 white pawn, f5 black pawn, h5 black pawn, c4 white pawn, e4 black pawn, f4 white pawn, h4 white pawn, e3 white bishop, g3 white pawn, a2 white pawn, b2 white pawn, c2 white rook, d2 white queen, e2 white bishop, f2 white knight, b1 white king, e1 white rook

Position after 29.Re1. White is clearly under pressure, while Black threatens both the lethal pawn break 29...b5 as well as the very strong 29...Ba4. However after 29...a4? 30.Qb4! the pawn break is stopped, costing Black much of his advantage. Black could still prepare the advance with ...Bd7 or ...Rcb8, but Carlsen elected to offer a draw to focus on the tiebreaks instead.

This game began with the Sveshnikov Variation of the Sicilian Defence, and followed Games 8 and 10 until Carlsen deviated with 8...Ne7. The game entered a complicated middlegame which Carlsen showed better understanding of than Caruana. Former world champions Garry Kasparov and Vladimir Kramnik both disapproved of Caruana's 18.f3 and 21.Rh2 idea, thinking that it just created weaknesses for Black to play against. Indeed, Carlsen was able to quickly push his central pawn majority while stalling Caruana's queenside. By move 25 he had a better position. However, Carlsen was unwilling to take risks. He did not play the challenging 25...b5, opting for the more prudent 25...a5 instead. Although White's position remained miserable, after 29...a4? Caruana was able to place his queen on b4 and stop the b5 pawn thrust. Black still had a superior position and a clear plan while White remained passive, but Carlsen offered a draw, opting to go to the tiebreaks.

It surprised some that the game ended with Carlsen having a stable long-term advantage with no risks, as well as more time on the clock. Kramnik was especially critical, saying he was shocked that Carlsen could decline to play on. At the press conference, Carlsen explained his decision with an earlier recommendation of his team to avoid any potential risks.

Sicilian Defence, Sveshnikov Variation (ECO B33)
1. e4 c5 2. Nf3 Nc6 3. d4 cxd4 4. Nxd4 Nf6 5. Nc3 e5 6. Ndb5 d6 7. Nd5 Nxd5 8. exd5 Ne7 9. c4 Ng6 10. Qa4 Bd7 11. Qb4 Bf5 12. h4 h5 13. Qa4 Bd7 14. Qb4 Bf5 15. Be3 a6 16. Nc3 Qc7 17. g3 Be7 18. f3 Nf8 19. Ne4 Nd7 20. Bd3 0-0 21. Rh2 Rac8 22. 0-0-0 Bg6 23. Rc2 f5 24. Nf2 Nc5 25. f4 a5 26. Qd2 e4 27. Be2 Be8 28. Kb1 Bf6 29. Re1 (diagram) a4 30. Qb4 g6 31. Rd1 Ra8 ½–½

=== Tie-break games ===
Before the tiebreak, it was expected that Carlsen would be advantaged because of his prowess at rapid time controls. Although the rating gap between Carlsen and Caruana in classical chess was a mere 3 points, in rapid chess it was 91 points. However, Carlsen's performance in the classical games, and the way in which he offered a draw in a favourable position in game 12 led Kasparov to opine that Carlsen appeared to be losing his nerve.

A random drawing determined that Carlsen would play White in the first tie-break game.

==== Game 13: Carlsen–Caruana, 1–0 ====
Carlsen–Caruana tiebreak Game 1

Position: d8 black rook, g8 black king, d7 black knight, f7 black pawn, g7 black pawn, h7 black pawn, a6 black pawn, c6 black pawn, d6 black knight, e6 black bishop, e5 black pawn, a4 white knight, c4 black pawn, e4 white pawn, a3 white pawn, b3 black rook, e3 white bishop, f3 white pawn, g3 white pawn, b2 white pawn, h2 white pawn, d1 white rook, e1 white rook, f1 white bishop, g1 white king

Position after 19.Rcd1. Caruana played 19...Nb5?, after which his position was collapsing with 20.Nc5 Rxb2 and the ensuing exchanges. Instead, the retreat 19...Nb7 offered better chances to hold the position.

The game began with the English Opening as with Games 4 and 9, with Carlsen deviating with 3.g3, entering the Bremen, Smyslov system. Carlsen offered the c4-pawn for more active queenside play, and, by move 12, had compromised Black's queenside pawn structure. By Black's 25th move, Carlsen was able to regain the sacrificed pawn and trade into an endgame with an extra pawn. However, the position was still not winning until Caruana's 37...Kxe4 mistake allowed Carlsen to create two connected passed pawns on the kingside and win the game.

English Opening, Bremen–Smyslov System (ECO A22)
1. c4 e5 2. Nc3 Nf6 3. g3 Bb4 4. e4 0-0 5. Nge2 c6 6. Bg2 a6 7. 0-0 b5 8. d4 d6 9. a3 Bxc3 10. Nxc3 bxc4 11. dxe5 dxe5 12. Na4 Be6 13. Qxd8 Rxd8 14. Be3 Nbd7 15. f3 Rab8 16. Rac1 Rb3 17. Rfe1 Ne8 18. Bf1 Nd6 19. Rcd1 (diagram) Nb5 20. Nc5 Rxb2 21. Nxe6 fxe6 22. Bxc4 Nd4 23. Bxd4 exd4 24. Bxe6+ Kf8 25. Rxd4 Ke7 26. Rxd7+ Rxd7 27. Bxd7 Kxd7 28. Rd1+ Ke6 29. f4 c5 30. Rd5 Rc2 31. h4 c4 32. f5+ Kf6 33. Rc5 h5 34. Kf1 Rc3 35. Kg2 Rxa3 36. Rxc4 Ke5 37. Rc7 Kxe4 38. Re7+ Kxf5 39. Rxg7 Kf6 40. Rg5 a5 41. Rxh5 a4 42. Ra5 Ra1 43. Kf3 a3 44. Ra6+ Kg7 45. Kg2 Ra2+ 46. Kh3 Ra1 47. h5 Kh7 48. g4 Kg7 49. Kh4 a2 50. Kg5 Kf7 51. h6 Rb1 52. Ra7+ Kg8 53. Rxa2 Rb5+ 54. Kg6 Rb6+ 55. Kh5 1–0

==== Game 14: Caruana–Carlsen, 0–1 ====
Caruana–Carlsen tiebreak Game 2

Position: a8 black rook, e8 black king, h8 black rook, b7 black pawn, e7 black bishop, f7 black pawn, g7 black pawn, d6 black pawn, g6 black knight, c5 white pawn, d5 white pawn, e5 black pawn, f5 black queen, h5 black pawn, a4 black pawn, h4 white pawn, c3 white knight, e3 white bishop, g3 white pawn, a2 white pawn, b2 white pawn, e2 white queen, f2 white pawn, c1 white rook, e1 white king, h1 white rook

Position after 21.c5. Carlsen correctly calculated that the c-pawn advance posed no immediate threat to Black's position, and castled.

This game began again with the Sveshnikov Variation of the Sicilian Defence and followed Game 12 until Carlsen deviated with 11...Qb8. The game developed into a complex middlegame. Caruana, behind in the tiebreak, played courageously with the pawn break 21.c5, opening the position before having castled. However, Carlsen coolly navigated the complications and then pounced when Caruana blundered, first with 26.c7? and then 28.Nd5? which, after 28...Kh7 avoiding the threatened knight fork, led to a position in which White could not defend his major pieces on the c-file. Caruana resigned.

Sicilian Defence, Sveshnikov Variation (ECO B33)
1. e4 c5 2. Nf3 Nc6 3. d4 cxd4 4. Nxd4 Nf6 5. Nc3 e5 6. Ndb5 d6 7. Nd5 Nxd5 8. exd5 Ne7 9. c4 Ng6 10. Qa4 Bd7 11. Qb4 Qb8 12. h4 h5 13. Be3 a6 14. Nc3 a5 15. Qb3 a4 16. Qd1 Be7 17. g3 Qc8 18. Be2 Bg4 19. Rc1 Bxe2 20. Qxe2 Qf5 21. c5 (diagram) 0-0 22. c6 bxc6 23. dxc6 Rfc8 24. Qc4 Bd8 25. Nd5 e4 26. c7 Bxc7 27. Nxc7 Ne5 28. Nd5 Kh7 0–1

==== Game 15: Carlsen–Caruana, 1–0 ====
Carlsen–Caruana tiebreak Game 3

Position: g7 black pawn, h7 black king, a6 black pawn, d6 black queen, e6 black knight, h6 black pawn, f5 black pawn, b4 white pawn, c4 white pawn, e3 white queen, h3 white pawn, a2 white pawn, g2 white bishop, h1 white king

Position after 41.b4

With his back to the wall, Caruana responded to 1.e4 with the Sicilian Defense, the only time he played the opening in the match. Carlsen, however, deftly used the fact that a draw was equivalent to a loss for Caruana, constantly forcing Caruana to avoid simplifications. Around move 34, Caruana had plenty of ways to draw the game at his disposal, but could not play them. In the end Caruana's desperate attempts to stir up complications led to a final mistake 43...Ne6?, allowing Carlsen to push his c-pawn through to promotion. Caruana resigned one move after the promotion.

Sicilian Defence (ECO B40)
1. e4 c5 2. Nf3 e6 3. c4 Nc6 4. d4 cxd4 5. Nxd4 Bc5 6. Nc2 Nf6 7. Nc3 0-0 8. Be3 b6 9. Be2 Bb7 10. 0-0 Qe7 11. Qd2 Rfd8 12. Rfd1 Ne5 13. Bxc5 bxc5 14. f4 Ng6 15. Qe3 d6 16. Rd2 a6 17. Rad1 Qc7 18. b3 h6 19. g3 Rd7 20. Bf3 Re8 21. Qf2 Ne7 22. h3 Red8 23. Bg2 Nc6 24. g4 Qa5 25. Na4 Qc7 26. e5 dxe5 27. Nxc5 Rxd2 28. Rxd2 Rxd2 29. Qxd2 Ba8 30. fxe5 Qxe5 31. Nd7 Qb2 32. Qd6 Nxd7 33. Qxd7 Qxc2 34. Qe8+ Kh7 35. Qxa8 Qd1+ 36. Kh2 Qd6+ 37. Kh1 Nd4 38. Qe4+ f5 39. gxf5 exf5 40. Qe3 Ne6 41. b4 (diagram) Ng5 42. c5 Qf6 43. c6 Ne6 44. a4 Nc7 45. Qf4 Ne6 46. Qd6 Qa1+ 47. Kh2 Nd4 48. c7 Qc3 49. Qc5 Qe3 50. c8=Q f4 51. Qg4 1–0

== Aftermath ==
Both players were gracious in the press conference after the match, and each praised his opponent. Caruana said the results showed that Carlsen is the strongest player in the world, while Carlsen said Caruana had just as much right as he has to call himself the best player in the world in classical chess. Carlsen's strategy to draw game 12 and win the tiebreaks had been vindicated, a point he emphasized in the press conference. Carlsen said he was very happy for having overcome such a strong obstacle, and would work to get better in the future. For his part, Caruana lamented the fact that one needed to find one's best form to win a tiebreak, which he was not able to do, but looked forward to making another title attempt in the future.

The 12-game streak of draws in the classical portion of this match was one of the reasons behind FIDE's decision to extend the 2021 world championship to 14 games.
