= Chirileni =

- Village
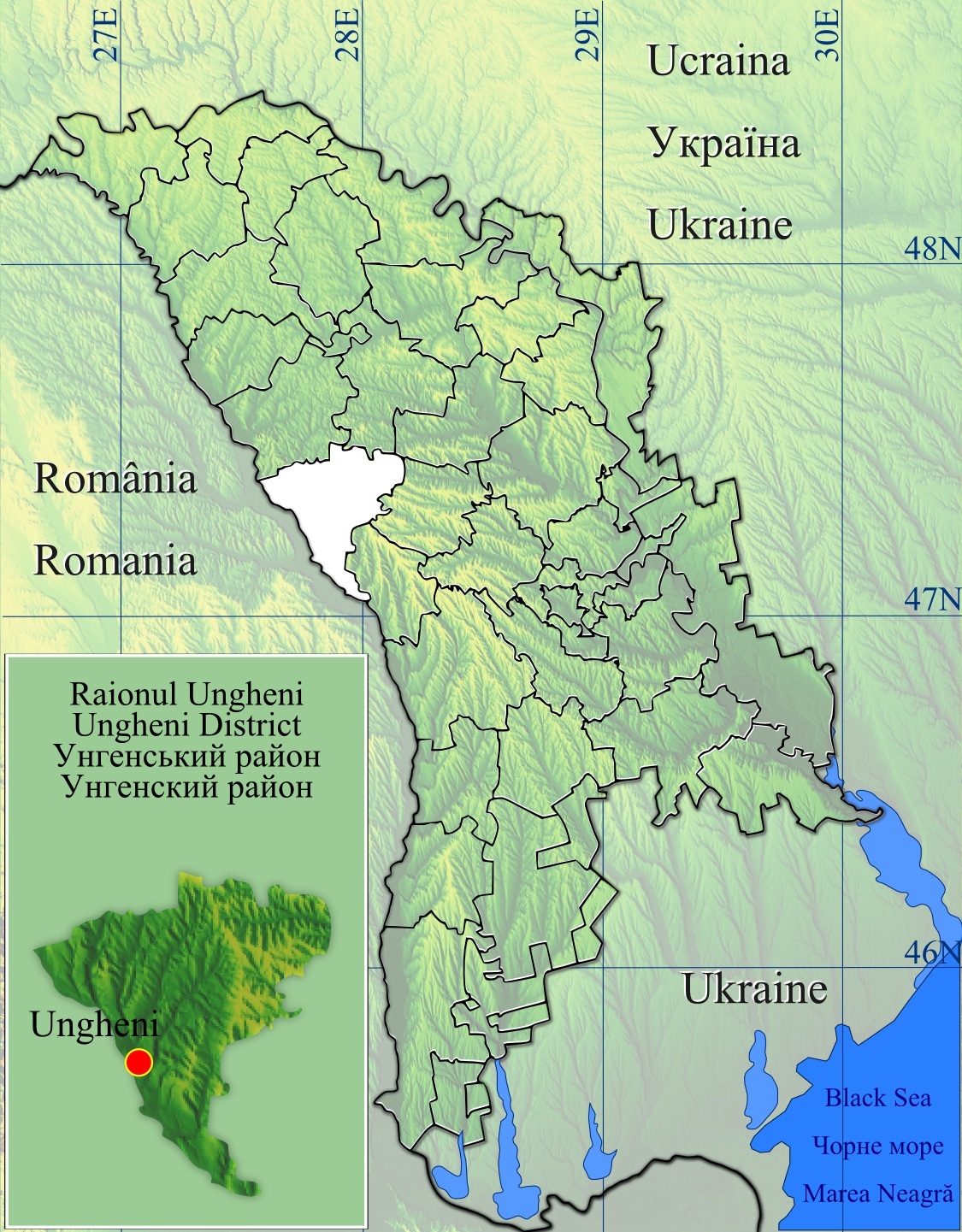
- Location within Ungheni
- Coordinates: 47°22′46″N 27°46′36″E
- Country: Moldova

Government
  - Mayor: Iurie Stoica (PLDM)

Population (2014 census)
  - Total: 1,747
- Time zone: UTC+2 (EET)
  - Summer (DST): UTC+3 (EEST)
- Postal code: MD-3618
- Website: www.chirileni.orc.md

Chirileni is a village in Ungheni District, Moldova. According to the census from 2014 there was a total population of 1,747 people living in this village. Of this population, 91.80% are ethnic Romanians and 8.20% ethnic Romani.
