= Ioan-Cristian Chirilă =

Romanian chess grandmaster (born 1991)

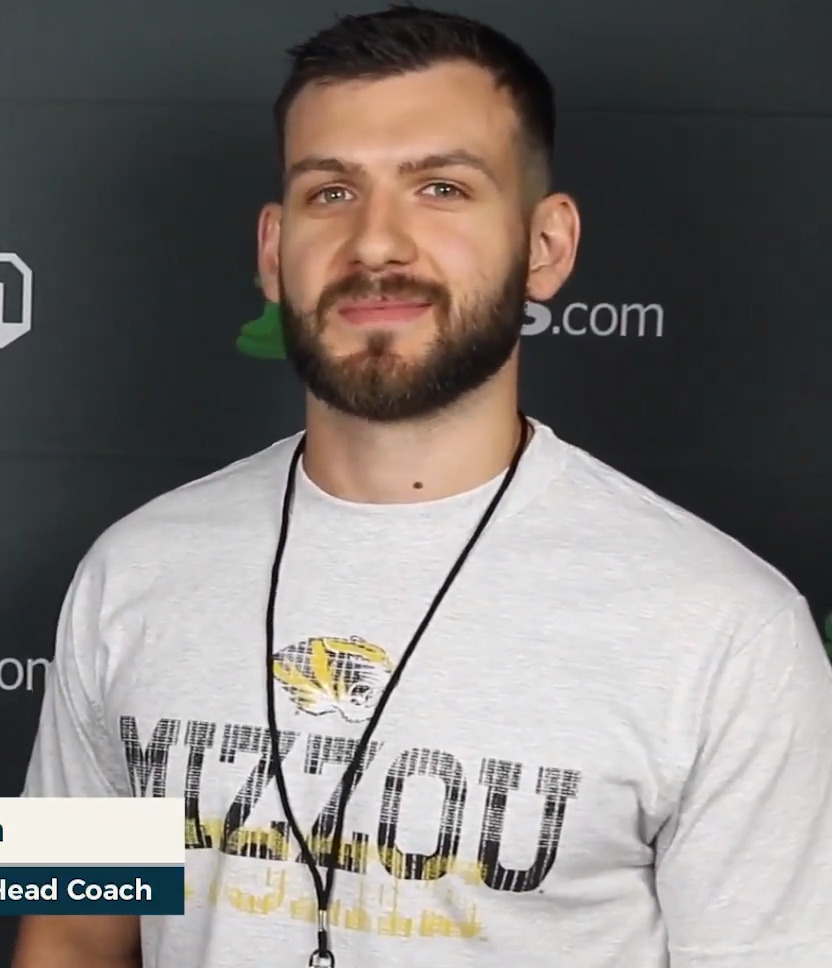
- Chirilă in 2019

Personal information
- Born: 6 January 1991 (age 35) Bucharest, Romania

Chess career
- Country: Romania
- Title: Grandmaster (2009)
- FIDE rating: 2506 (July 2026)
- Peak rating: 2576 (July 2018)

Ioan-Cristian Chirilă (born 6 January 1991) is a Romanian chess player. He was awarded the title of Grandmaster by FIDE in 2009.

== Chess career ==
In 2001, Chirilă won the Romanian youth championship when he was 10 years old. He repeated this achievement the following year in the Romanian under 12 championship. Chirilă won two more Romanian youth championships, in 2006 and 2009. He participated in the European Youth Team Championship, winning two medals for individual results: gold (2008, on the first board) and silver (2006, on the second board).

In 2007, Chirilă became world youth champion in the U-16 age group. In 2010 he was awarded a full ride scholarship at the University of Texas at Dallas. In April 2015, Chirilă finished runner-up to Yuniesky Quezada in the Philadelphia Open. In 2016 Chirilă won the Millionaire Chess Open in the U-2550 rating group.

In June 2018 he won the National Open tournament in Las Vegas, US. This success earned Chirilă his first magazine cover for Chess Life, one of the major American chess magazines. In September–October he was part of the Romanian team at the 43rd Chess Olympiad.

Chirilă served as one of the seconds of Fabiano Caruana during the 2018 World Chess Championship match. Together, the pair host the C-Squared podcast on YouTube as well as its corresponding Twitter account. Their podcast focuses on chess and frequently features high profile chess figures.
