= 2015 in chess =

Events in chess during the year 2015:

== 2015 tournaments ==
This is a list of significant 2015 chess tournaments:

Tournament	Dates	Players	Winner	Runner-up	Third
2015 Tata Steel Chess Tournament	12–27 Jan	14	(Norway) Magnus Carlsen	(France) Maxime Vachier-Lagrave	(Netherlands) Anish Giri
2015 Grenke Chess Classic	2–9 Feb	8	(Norway) Magnus Carlsen	(Germany) Arkadij Naiditsch	(England) Michael Adams
2015 Zurich Chess Challenge	13–19 Feb	6	(United States) Hikaru Nakamura	(India) Viswanathan Anand	(Russia) Vladimir Kramnik
FIDE Grand Prix 2014–15 Tbilisi	14–28 Feb	12	(Russia) Evgeny Tomashevsky	(Russia) Dmitry Jakovenko	(Azerbaijan) Teimour Radjabov
Women's World Chess Championship 2015	16 Mar – 7 Apr	64	(Ukraine) Mariya Muzychuk	(Russia) Natalia Pogonina	(India) Dronavalli Harika (Sweden) Pia Cramling
2015 Aeroflot Open	27 Mar – 7 Apr	68	(Russia) Ian Nepomniachtchi	(Russia) Daniil Dubov	(Russia) Ivan Bukavshin
Shamkir Chess 2015	16–26 Apr	10	(Norway) Magnus Carlsen	(India) Viswanathan Anand	(United States) Wesley So
FIDE Grand Prix 2014–15 Khanty-Mansiysk	14–26 May	12	(Russia) Dmitry Jakovenko	(United States) Hikaru Nakamura	(Italy) Fabiano Caruana
Norway Chess 2015	15–26 Jun	10	(Bulgaria) Veselin Topalov	(India) Viswanathan Anand	(United States) Hikaru Nakamura
2015 Dortmund Sparkassen Chess Meeting	27 Jun – 5 Jul	8	(United States) Fabiano Caruana	(United States) Wesley So	(Germany) Liviu-Dieter Nisipeanu
2015 Biel Chess Festival	20–30 Jul	6	(France) Maxime Vachier-Lagrave	(Poland) Radosław Wojtaszek	(England) Michael Adams
2015 Sinquefield Cup	22 Aug – 3 Sept	10	(Armenia) Levon Aronian	(Norway) Magnus Carlsen	(United States) Hikaru Nakamura
Chess World Cup 2015	10 Sep – 5 Oct	128	(Russia) Sergey Karjakin	(Russia) Peter Svidler	(Netherlands) Anish Giri (Ukraine) Pavel Eljanov
Millionaire Chess 2015	8–12 Oct		(United States) Hikaru Nakamura	(Vietnam) Lê Quang Liêm	(China) Yu Yangyi
2015 World Rapid Chess Championship	10–12 Oct	158	(Norway) Magnus Carlsen	(Russia) Ian Nepomniachtchi	(Azerbaijan) Teimour Radjabov
2015 World Blitz Chess Championship	13–14 Oct	188	(Russia) Alexander Grischuk	(France) Maxime Vachier-Lagrave	(Russia) Vladimir Kramnik
2015 Bilbao Chess Masters Final	25 Oct – 1 Nov	4	(United States) Wesley So	(Netherlands) Anish Giri	(India) Viswanathan Anand (China) Ding Liren
2015 London Chess Classic	4–13 Dec	10	(Norway) Magnus Carlsen	(Netherlands) Anish Giri	(France) Maxime Vachier-Lagrave
2015 Qatar Masters Open	20–29 Dec	132	(Norway) Magnus Carlsen	(China) Yu Yangyi	(Russia) Vladimir Kramnik

== Key dates ==
- 26 May: Fabiano Caruana and Hikaru Nakamura clinch the top two positions in the FIDE Grand Prix 2014–15, securing their spots in the 2016 Candidates Tournament
- 5 October: Sergey Karjakin and Peter Svidler place first and second, respectively, in the Chess World Cup 2015, securing two spots in the 2016 Candidates Tournament
- 12 October: Magnus Carlsen defends the World Chess Rapid Championship title
- 14 October: Alexander Grischuck wins the World Chess Blitz Championship title

== FIDE world rankings ==
The FIDE World Rankings in December was

Rank	Player	Rating
1	(Norway) Magnus Carlsen	2834
2	(Bulgaria) Veselin Topalov	2803
3–4	(India) Viswanathan Anand	2796
3–4	(Russia) Vladimir Kramnik	2796
5	(United States) Hikaru Nakamura	2793
6	(Armenia) Levon Aronian	2788
7	(United States) Fabiano Caruana	2787
8	(Netherlands) Anish Giri	2784
9	(China) Ding Liren	2776
10	(United States) Wesley So	2775
11	(France) Maxime Vachier-Lagrave	2773
12	(Russia) Sergey Karjakin	2766
13	(Ukraine) Pavel Eljanov	2763
14	(Russia) Peter Svidler	2751
15	(China) Li Chao	2750
16	(Azerbaijan) Shakhriyar Mamedyarov	2748
17	(Russia) Alexander Grischuk	2747
18	(Russia) Evgeny Tomashevsky	2744
19	(India) Pentala Harikrishna	2743
20–21	(England) Michael Adams	2737
20–21	(Russia) Dmitry Jakovenko	2737
