= Candidates Tournament 2016 =

Chess tournament in Moscow, Russia

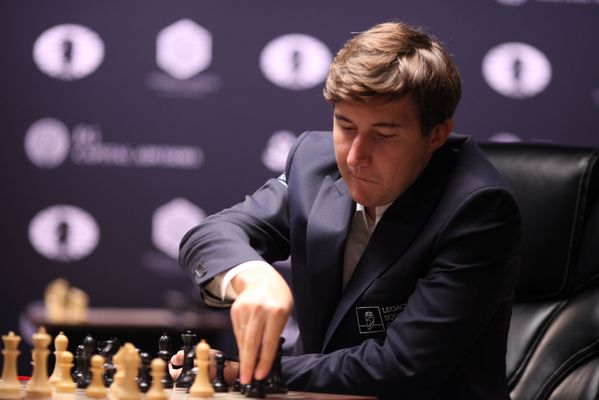
- Sergey Karjakin, the winner of the Candidates Tournament 2016, advanced to the World Chess Championship 2016 match.
- Venue: Central Telegraph Building
- Location: Moscow, Russia
- Dates: 11–30 March 2016
- Competitors: 8 from 6 nations
- Winning score: 8.5 points of 14

Champion
- (Russia) Sergey Karjakin

The Candidates Tournament 2016 was an eight-player double round-robin chess tournament, held in Moscow, Russia, from 11 to 30 March 2016. The winner, Sergey Karjakin, earned the right to challenge the defending world champion, Magnus Carlsen, in the World Chess Championship 2016. The result was decided in the final round when Karjakin defeated runner-up Fabiano Caruana.

== Organization ==
The tournament was contested as a double round-robin with each player playing 14 games. Four rest days took place after rounds 3, 6, 9, and 12. The winner of the tournament would be the challenger of Magnus Carlsen at the 2016 World Chess Championship. At the DI Central Telegraph Building, Agon had designed and built a 20000 square-foot space near the Kremlin to woo more spectators to the sport, with 99% of the focus on online viewership. As the official organizer, they owned live moves and video broadcasting rights. Legal actions were commenced against sites who violated live broadcasting restrictions on games and moves.

The prize fund (Regulations 3.8.1) was 420,000 euros, with 95,000 to the winner, 88,000 to 2nd place, 75,000 to 3rd, 55,000 to 4th, 40,000 to 5th, 28,000 to 6th, 22,000 to 7th, and 17,000 to 8th. Prize money would be divided equally between players on the same score.

FIDE's commercial partner Agon was the official organizer, with support from the Russian Chess Federation. The main sponsor was the Tashir Group, a Russian real estate company headed by Armenian-born businessman Samvel Karapetyan.

The FIDE supervisor was Zurab Azmaiparashvili and the chief arbiter was Werner Stubenvoll from Austria.

== Qualifiers ==
There were five different qualification paths to the Candidates Tournament. In order of priority, these were: the loser of the World Chess Championship 2014 match, the top two finishers in the Chess World Cup 2015, the top two finishers in the FIDE Grand Prix 2014–15, the next two highest rated players (average FIDE rating on the 12 monthly lists from January to December 2015, with at least 30 games played) who played in the Chess World Cup 2015 or FIDE Grand Prix 2014–15, and one player nominated by the organizers (Agon).

Qualification path	Player	Age	Rating	World Ranking
2014 World Championship runner-up	(India) Viswanathan Anand	46	2762	12
The top two finishers in the Chess World Cup 2015	(Russia) Sergey Karjakin	26	2760	13
The top two finishers in the Chess World Cup 2015	(Russia) Peter Svidler	39	2757	16
The top two finishers in the FIDE Grand Prix 2014–15	(United States) Fabiano Caruana	23	2794	3
The top two finishers in the FIDE Grand Prix 2014–15	(United States) Hikaru Nakamura	28	2790	6
The top two players with highest average 2015 rating who played in the World Cup or Grand Prix	(Bulgaria) Veselin Topalov	41	2780	8
The top two players with highest average 2015 rating who played in the World Cup or Grand Prix	(Netherlands) Anish Giri	21	2793	4
Wild card nomination of the organizers (Agon), with a FIDE rating of at least 2725 in July 2015	(Armenia) Levon Aronian	33	2786	7

FIDE gave the qualifiers until 11 January to decide upon participation and sign the contract, and all accepted even though Veselin Topalov was open in his dislike of Moscow as a location. Topalov did not attend the opening ceremony, leaving himself open to a forfeiture of 5% of his prize money to each of FIDE and the organizers, by 3.11.2 of the Regulations.

The ratings and rankings in the table are taken from the March 2016 FIDE list. They are provided for information purposes only, and were not used for seeding. Notable players who did not qualify include Vladimir Kramnik, a former World Champion and the world number 2 as of March 2016, and Maxime Vachier-Lagrave, the world number 5. The age column is in years as of 15 March 2016. FIDE used a country-diversion system, so that Svidler and Karjakin, similarly Nakamura and Caruana, were paired together in rounds 1 and 8, to avoid conflicts in late rounds, as seen in the pairings.

=== Qualifiers by rating ===
The following were the final placings of players attempting to qualify by the 2015 rating lists.

The list omits world champion Magnus Carlsen. Players who qualified for the Candidates Tournament by other means are shown with a shaded background. The two qualifiers by rating were Topalov and Giri (marked with a green background).

Player	Jan	Feb	Mar	Apr	May	Jun	Jul	Aug	Sep	Oct	Nov	Dec	Average
(Bulgaria) Veselin Topalov	2800	2800	2798	2798	2798	2798	2816	2816	2816	2813	2803	2803	2804.92
(India) Viswanathan Anand	2797	2797	2791	2791	2804	2804	2816	2816	2816	2803	2803	2796	2802.83
(United States) Fabiano Caruana	2820	2811	2802	2802	2803	2805	2797	2808	2808	2796	2787	2787	2802.17
(United States) Hikaru Nakamura	2776	2776	2798	2798	2799	2802	2814	2814	2814	2816	2793	2793	2799.42
(Netherlands) Anish Giri	2784	2797	2790	2790	2776	2773	2791	2793	2793	2798	2778	2784	2787.25
(Russia) Vladimir Kramnik	2783	2783	2783	2783	2777	2783	2783	2777	2777	2777	2796	2796	2783.17
(Russia) Alexander Grischuk	2810	2810	2794	2794	2780	2781	2771	2771	2771	2774	2750	2747	2779.42
(Armenia) Levon Aronian	2797	2777	2770	2770	2776	2780	2765	2765	2765	2784	2781	2788	2776.50

== Schedule ==
Date	Day	Event
10 March	Thursday	Opening ceremony
11 March	Friday	Round 1
12 March	Saturday	Round 2
13 March	Sunday	Round 3
14 March	Monday	Free day
15 March	Tuesday	Round 4
16 March	Wednesday	Round 5
17 March	Thursday	Round 6
18 March	Friday	Free day
19 March	Saturday	Round 7

Date	Day	Event
20 March	Sunday	Round 8
21 March	Monday	Round 9
22 March	Tuesday	Free day
23 March	Wednesday	Round 10
24 March	Thursday	Round 11
25 March	Friday	Round 12
26 March	Saturday	Free day
27 March	Sunday	Round 13
28 March	Monday	Round 14
29 March	Tuesday	Closing ceremony

== Standings ==
Pos	Player	Pld	W	D	L	Pts	Qualification	KAR	CAR	ANA	SVI	ARO	GIR	NAK	TOP
1	Sergey Karjakin (RUS) (Q)	14	4	9	1	8.5	Advance to title match	—	1 ½	1 0	½ ½	½ ½	½ ½	1 ½	1 ½
2	Fabiano Caruana (USA)	14	2	11	1	7.5		½ 0	—	1 ½	½ ½	½ ½	½ ½	1 ½	½ ½
3	Viswanathan Anand (IND)	14	4	7	3	7.5		1 0	½ 0	—	1 ½	1 ½	½ ½	½ 0	1 ½
4	Peter Svidler (RUS)	14	1	12	1	7		½ ½	½ ½	½ 0	—	½ 1	½ ½	½ ½	½ ½
5	Levon Aronian (ARM)	14	2	10	2	7		½ ½	½ ½	½ 0	0 ½	—	½ ½	1 ½	½ 1
6	Anish Giri (NED)	14	0	14	0	7		½ ½	½ ½	½ ½	½ ½	½ ½	—	½ ½	½ ½
7	Hikaru Nakamura (USA)	14	3	8	3	7		½ 0	½ 0	1 ½	½ ½	½ 0	½ ½	—	1 1
8	Veselin Topalov (BUL)	14	0	9	5	4.5		½ 0	½ ½	½ 0	½ ½	0 ½	½ ½	0 0	—

Source: moscow2016.fide.com
(Q) Qualified for the phase indicated

Notes

Tie-breaks are in order: 1) head-to-head score among tied players, 2) total number of wins, 3) Sonneborn–Berger score (SB), 4) tie-break games.

== Results by round ==
Pairings and results Numbers in parentheses indicate players' scores prior to the round.

Round 1 – 11 March 2016
(India) Viswanathan Anand	(Bulgaria) Veselin Topalov	1–0	C65 Ruy Lopez, Berlin Defence
(Netherlands) Anish Giri	(Armenia) Levon Aronian	½–½	D37 Queen's Gambit Declined
(Russia) Sergey Karjakin	(Russia) Peter Svidler	½–½	D16 Slav Defence, Soultanbéieff Variation
(United States) Hikaru Nakamura	(United States) Fabiano Caruana	½–½	A30 English Opening, Symmetrical Variation
Round 2 – 12 March 2016
(Armenia) Levon Aronian (½)	(India) Viswanathan Anand (1)	½–½	D37 Queen's Gambit Declined
(United States) Fabiano Caruana (½)	(Netherlands) Anish Giri (½)	½–½	B32 Ruy Lopez, Berlin Defence
(Russia) Sergey Karjakin (½)	(United States) Hikaru Nakamura (½)	1–0	E15 Queen's Indian Defence, Fianchetto Variation, Check Variation, Intermezzo Line
(Russia) Peter Svidler (½)	(Bulgaria) Veselin Topalov (0)	½–½	C67 Ruy Lopez, Berlin Defence
Round 3 – 13 March 2016
(India) Viswanathan Anand (1½)	(United States) Fabiano Caruana (1)	½–½	C65 Ruy Lopez, Berlin Defence
(Netherlands) Anish Giri (1)	(Russia) Sergey Karjakin (1½)	½–½	E15 Queen's Indian Defence, Fianchetto Variation, Check Variation, Intermezzo Line
(United States) Hikaru Nakamura (½)	(Russia) Peter Svidler (1)	½–½	D16 Slav Defence, Soultanbéieff Variation
(Bulgaria) Veselin Topalov (½)	(Armenia) Levon Aronian (1)	0–1	A29 English, Four Knights, Kingside Fianchetto
Round 4 – 15 March 2016
(United States) Fabiano Caruana (1½)	(Bulgaria) Veselin Topalov (½)	½–½	C50 Giuoco Piano
(Russia) Sergey Karjakin (2)	(India) Viswanathan Anand (2)	1–0	A06 Réti Opening
(United States) Hikaru Nakamura (1)	(Netherlands) Anish Giri (1½)	½–½	D45 Semi-Slav, Stoltz Variation
(Russia) Peter Svidler (1½)	(Armenia) Levon Aronian (2)	½–½	A22 English, Four Knights, Smyslov System
Round 5 – 16 March 2016
(India) Viswanathan Anand (2)	(United States) Hikaru Nakamura (1½)	½–½	C65 Ruy Lopez, Berlin Defence
(Armenia) Levon Aronian (2½)	(United States) Fabiano Caruana (2)	½–½	A77 Benoni Defence, Classical, Czerniak Defence, Tal Line
(Netherlands) Anish Giri (2)	(Russia) Peter Svidler (2)	½–½	D73 Neo-Grünfeld Defence
(Bulgaria) Veselin Topalov (1)	(Russia) Sergey Karjakin (3)	½–½	E15 Queen's Indian Defence, Fianchetto Variation, Check Variation, Intermezzo Line
Round 6 – 17 March 2016
(India) Viswanathan Anand (2½)	(Russia) Peter Svidler (2½)	1–0	C88 Ruy Lopez, Closed, Anti-Marshall 8.a4
(Bulgaria) Veselin Topalov (1½)	(Netherlands) Anish Giri (2½)	½–½	E61 Indian Game, West Indian Defence
(Armenia) Levon Aronian (3)	(United States) Hikaru Nakamura (2)	1–0	E15 Queen's Indian Defence, Fianchetto Variation, Nimzowistch Variation
(United States) Fabiano Caruana (2½)	(Russia) Sergey Karjakin (3½)	½–½	E15 Queen's Indian Defence, Fianchetto Variation, Check Variation, Intermezzo Line
Round 7 – 19 March 2016
(Russia) Peter Svidler (2½)	(United States) Fabiano Caruana (3)	½–½	A35 English, Symmetrical, Four Knights
(Russia) Sergey Karjakin (4)	(Armenia) Levon Aronian (4)	½–½	A08 King's Indian Attack
(United States) Hikaru Nakamura (2)	(Bulgaria) Veselin Topalov (2)	1–0	D12 Slav Defence, Quiet Variation, Schallop Defence
(Netherlands) Anish Giri (3)	(India) Viswanathan Anand (3½)	½–½	D37 Queen's Gambit Declined, Barmen Variation

Round 8 – 20 March 2016
(Russia) Peter Svidler (3)	(Russia) Sergey Karjakin (4½)	½–½	A29 English, Four Knights, Fianchetto Line
(United States) Fabiano Caruana (3½)	(United States) Hikaru Nakamura (3)	1–0	C65 Ruy Lopez, Berlin Defence
(Armenia) Levon Aronian (4½)	(Netherlands) Anish Giri (3½)	½–½	D43 Semi-Slav Defense
(Bulgaria) Veselin Topalov (2)	(India) Viswanathan Anand (4)	½–½	A11 Queen's Gambit Declined, Barmen Variation
Round 9 – 21 March 2016
(Bulgaria) Veselin Topalov (2½)	(Russia) Peter Svidler (3½)	½–½	C88 Ruy Lopez, Closed, Anti-Marshall 8.a4
(India) Viswanathan Anand (4½)	(Armenia) Levon Aronian (5)	1–0	C50 Giuoco Piano
(Netherlands) Anish Giri (4)	(United States) Fabiano Caruana (4½)	½–½	D70 Neo-Grünfeld Defence, Goglidze Attack
(United States) Hikaru Nakamura (3)	(Russia) Sergey Karjakin (5)	½–½	E15 Queen's Indian Defence, Fianchetto Variation, Check Variation, Intermezzo Line
Round 10 – 23 March 2016
(Russia) Peter Svidler (4)	(United States) Hikaru Nakamura (3½)	½–½	A29 English, Four Knights, Fianchetto Line
(Russia) Sergey Karjakin (5½)	(Netherlands) Anish Giri (4½)	½–½	D45f Semi-Slav, Stoltz Variation
(United States) Fabiano Caruana (5)	(India) Viswanathan Anand (5½)	1–0	A29 English, Four Knights, Fianchetto Line
(Armenia) Levon Aronian (5)	(Bulgaria) Veselin Topalov (3)	½–½	A29 English, Four Knights, Fianchetto Line
Round 11 – 24 March 2016
(Armenia) Levon Aronian (5½)	(Russia) Peter Svidler (4½)	0–1	D16 Slav Defence, Soultanbéieff Variation
(Bulgaria) Veselin Topalov (3½)	(United States) Fabiano Caruana (6)	½–½	A33 English, Symmetrical, Anti-Benoni
(India) Viswanathan Anand (5½)	(Russia) Sergey Karjakin (6)	1–0	A07 Ruy Lopez, Berlin Defence
(Netherlands) Anish Giri (5)	(United States) Hikaru Nakamura (4)	½–½	C50 Giuoco Piano
Round 12 – 25 March 2016
(Russia) Peter Svidler (5½)	(Netherlands) Anish Giri (5½)	½–½	A29 English, Four Knights, Fianchetto Line
(United States) Hikaru Nakamura (4½)	(India) Viswanathan Anand (6½)	1–0	A29 English, Four Knights, Fianchetto Line
(Russia) Sergey Karjakin (6)	(Bulgaria) Veselin Topalov (4)	1–0	B90 Sicilian Defence, Najdorf Variation, Adams Attack
(United States) Fabiano Caruana (6½)	(Armenia) Levon Aronian (5½)	½–½	C78 Ruy Lopez, Closed, Martinez Variation
Round 13 – 27 March 2016
(United States) Fabiano Caruana (7)	(Russia) Peter Svidler (6)	½–½	C78 Ruy Lopez, Closed, Martinez Variation
(Armenia) Levon Aronian (6)	(Russia) Sergey Karjakin (7)	½–½	A29 English, Four Knights, Fianchetto Line
(Bulgaria) Veselin Topalov (4)	(United States) Hikaru Nakamura (5½)	0–1	D37 Queen's Gambit Declined
(India) Viswanathan Anand (6½)	(Netherlands) Anish Giri (6)	½–½	C50 Giuoco Piano
Round 14 – 28 March 2016
(Russia) Peter Svidler (6½)	(India) Viswanathan Anand (7)	½–½	A29 English, Four Knights, Fianchetto Line
(Netherlands) Anish Giri (6½)	(Bulgaria) Veselin Topalov (4)	½–½	E06 Catalan Opening, Closed Variation
(United States) Hikaru Nakamura (6½)	(Armenia) Levon Aronian (6½)	½–½	D38 Queen's Gambit Declined, Ragozin Variation, Alekhine Variation
(Russia) Sergey Karjakin (7½)	(United States) Fabiano Caruana (7½)	1–0	B67 Sicilian Defence, Richter-Rauzer Attack, Neo-Modern Variation

=== Points by round ===
For each player, the difference between wins and losses after each round is shown. The players with the highest difference for each round are marked with green background.

Final place	Player \ Round	1	2	3	4	5	6	7	8	9	10	11	12	13	14
1	Sergey Karjakin (RUS)	=	+1	+1	+2	+2	+2	+2	+2	+2	+2	+1	+2	+2	+3
2	Fabiano Caruana (USA)	=	=	=	=	=	=	=	+1	+1	+2	+2	+2	+2	+1
3	Viswanathan Anand (IND)	+1	+1	+1	=	=	+1	+1	+1	+2	+1	+2	+1	+1	+1
4	Peter Svidler (RUS)	=	=	=	=	=	–1	–1	–1	–1	–1	=	=	=	=
5	Levon Aronian (ARM)	=	=	+1	+1	+1	+2	+2	+2	+1	+1	=	=	=	=
6	Anish Giri (NED)	=	=	=	=	=	=	=	=	=	=	=	=	=	=
7	Hikaru Nakamura (USA)	=	–1	–1	–1	–1	–2	–1	–2	–2	–2	–2	–1	=	=
8	Veselin Topalov (BUL)	–1	–1	–2	–2	–2	–2	–3	–3	–3	–3	–3	–4	–5	–5

== Summary ==
Karjakin–Anand, round 4

Position: c8 black rook, d8 black queen, g8 black king, a7 black pawn, e7 black knight, g7 black pawn, h7 black pawn, a6 black rook, c5 black pawn, d5 black pawn, f5 black pawn, h4 white pawn, a3 white pawn, b3 white pawn, e3 white pawn, f3 white knight, g3 white pawn, c2 white queen, f2 white pawn, a1 white rook, d1 white rook, g1 white king

Position before 20.Qc3
Topalov–Karjakin, round 5

Position: a8 black rook, b8 black knight, d8 black queen, e8 black rook, g8 black king, a7 black pawn, e7 black bishop, f7 black pawn, g7 black pawn, h7 black pawn, a6 black bishop, f6 black knight, c5 black pawn, d5 black pawn, b3 white pawn, c3 white knight, f3 white knight, g3 white pawn, a2 white pawn, d2 white bishop, e2 white pawn, f2 white pawn, g2 white bishop, h2 white pawn, b1 white rook, d1 white queen, f1 white rook, g1 white king

Position before 13.Ne5
Aronian–Nakamura, round 6

Position: d7 white rook, f7 black pawn, g7 black king, h6 black pawn, e5 white pawn, f5 white king, f4 white pawn, h4 white pawn, a2 black rook

Position on move 74 with Black to move. Black touched his king, and so had to move it, thus allowing 75.Kf6 with decisive advantage

=== Rounds 1–3 ===
The first round saw Anand beat Topalov after mutual blunders around move 20, then again around move 40, to get an early lead as all other games were drawn, two of them right at the (minimal) 30-move mark.

Round 2 went similarly, with two of the 3 draws occurring in 30 moves, while Nakamura missed a tactic against Karjakin and played a large unforced blunder on move 29, costing him the game.

Round 3 saw both leaders draw, as Giri made two knight sacrifices before forcing an early draw by repetition against Karjakin, while Anand had a nagging edge against Caruana that eventually evaporated. Meanwhile, Aronian joined the leaders by beating a very off-form Topalov as Black, while Svidler as Black out-prepared Nakamura in a complicated Semi-Slav line to move 25, but failed to convert a pawn-up endgame in which Mark Dvoretsky questioned his lack of killer instinct.

=== Rounds 4–6 ===
After a rest day, two of the leaders faced each other in Round 4, with Karjakin as White choosing a passive opening and coming up with an early novelty against Anand, and then saddling him with hanging pawns (see diagram). He then switched to a pressing endgame against Black's pawn weaknesses, and soon after the time control an Anand miscue led to his immediate resignation. This was Karjakin's first career victory over Anand in classical time controls.

Nakamura and Giri drew in just over an hour in 30 moves in a game that might have been completely pre-analyzed, while Svidler and Aronian drew a rook ending at the time control. The game between Caruana and Topalov saw a Giuoco Pianissimo opening, before Topalov opened up the position and later blundered in time pressure, but Caruana spoiled a large advantage right after the time control by miscounting the pieces, and in the end a double rook endgame was drawn.

In Round 5, all the games were drawn, three of them at move 30 and the other at move 40. Unlike the previous round, when Karjakin himself had hanging pawns, it did not matter (see diagram) and he drew comfortably.

Round 6 saw Svidler losing out of the opening against Anand, while Karjakin held a materially imbalanced position to a draw against Caruana. The Topalov-Giri game saw a practical novelty already at move 3, with a resulting drawn knight endgame after the 60-move mark. In the game Aronian-Nakamura, Aronian nurtured an advantage for some time, but the endgame appeared to be drawn. But on move 74, Nakamura made a fingerfehler and touched his king, forcing him to make a losing move (see diagram). The incident was controversial as Nakamura initially tried to claim j'adoube, the international term to convey that one intends to adjust the piece, not move it. This win brought Aronian into the lead with Karjakin, with Anand just behind, going into the second rest day.

=== Rounds 7–9 ===
After the second rest day, the two leaders, Karjakin and Aronian, faced each other in Round 7. As White, Karjakin played an aggressive opening, but Aronian was able to neutralize it and the game ended in a draw. Svidler got a winning position out of the opening against Caruana, but was not able to convert it, resulting in a draw. Giri and Anand drew an uneventful game as Giri did not feel ready to challenge Anand’s preparation. Nakamura defeated Topalov in a complex game featuring a bishop sacrifice from Topalov.

In Round 8, Aronian and Giri made an uneventful draw. Topalov and Anand also drew, with Topalov saying he did not expect Anand to repeat the same opening he played against Giri in the previous round. Svidler and Karjakin played a sharp back and forth game which eventually ended in a draw. Caruana defeated Nakamura in an opposite-side castling game coming out of the Anti-Berlin.

In Round 9, Karjakin played his fourth Queen’s Indian game against Nakamura, keeping his undefeated plus two score with a draw. Topalov had good winning chances against Svidler but could not capitalize, resulting in a draw. Giri and Caruana played a combative game in which Giri had a large advantage, but could not convert in through the complications, resulting in Giri’s ninth draw of the tournament. Anand beat Aronian in a rather one-sided game, taking Aronian’s shared first place with Karjakin as a result.

=== Rounds 10–12 ===
Round 10 saw three of the four games start with the same opening position after six moves. The one game that did not, Karjakin vs Giri, ended in an uneventful draw. Both Svidler vs Nakamura and Aronian vs Topalov also ended in draws. Caruana, playing White against Anand, unleashed a powerful opening novelty, obtaining a tremendous advantage and winning the game as a result. With the win, Caruana replaced Anand as the tournament co-leader alongside Karjakin.

In Round 11, Giri got a promising position against Nakamura but had to settle for a draw after making a tactical oversight. Topalov and Caruana played a roller-coaster game which eventually ended in a draw. Svidler defeated Aronian with the Black pieces after Aronian overpressed a better position, effectively ending Aronian’s chances of winning the tournament. In the most important game of the round, Anand defeated Karjakin from an equal-looking endgame, making Anand and Caruana the new leaders of the tournament.

In Round 12, Aronian, playing with Black, had a winning rook sacrifice against Caruana, but could not evaluate it correctly. Aronian did not play it and Caruana was able to hold the game to a draw. Giri was pressing against Svidler with the Black pieces, but never got a serious advantage, resulting in Giri’s twelfth consecutive draw of the tournament. Nakamura, playing with White, crushed Anand in just 26 moves after outpreparing him in a complicated line of the English. Karjakin defeated Topalov with White in a complicated Najdorf, putting him back in shared first with Caruana.

=== Rounds 13–14 ===
In the penultimate round, Nakamura beat Topalov in a smooth game with Black to get back to a 50% score. Anand and Giri played an adventurous game, but neither player could make the most of their chances and the game ended in a draw. Aronian put pressure on Karjakin but could not break through Karjakin’s tenacious defense, resulting in a draw. Caruana vs Svidler reached the theoretically drawn rook and bishop vs rook endgame. On move 102, Svidler made a decisive mistake but Caruana did not punish it, allowing Svidler to save a draw through the fifty-move rule. Going into the final round, only Karjakin or Caruana could win the tournament.

The tournament winner was decided in the final round game between Karjakin (playing White) and Caruana. Before this round, these were the only two players who could win the tournament, having 7.5 points each. For Caruana to win the tournament, he needed to win the game, or draw and rely on Anand to win with Black against Svidler.

Caruana chose the Sicilian Defence, signaling his intention to play for a win. Karjakin continued with the Open Sicilian. Caruana took the initiative and it appeared as if a win for Black could be possible. His pawns were attacking the White king that had castled on the queenside. However, his own king had not castled and became a requirement for the defense of three pawns on d, e, and f file. Eventually, this weakness (aided by an imprecise move 36...Re4?) led to the collapse of the Black defense. Caruana resigned on move 44, making Karjakin the winner and challenger for the World Chess Championship 2016.

== Broadcast restrictions ==
In a matter that dominated early discussion of the Candidates, Agon controversially tried to claim that only approved broadcasters were able to put forth the game moves in real time. However, a similar restriction was attempted by Sofia organizers first for the Topalov-Kamsky match in 2009 and then the World Chess Championship 2010, with the end result that ChessBase was found non-culpable in a resulting lawsuit. The judge in that case took only half an hour to reject all demands from the Bulgarian Chess Federation (BCF), while ChessBase relied on the legal definition of a database. The most important aspect was that the judge did not agree that a chess game can be seen as a database, and therefore the BCF could not refer to their rights as database producers. The president of the BCF, Silvio Danailov, estimated the loss at 1 million euros in a Forbes interview, though they had only asked 15000 euros from ChessVibes for retransmission rights, and crucially only spent 8000 euros themselves, which the judge found insufficiently substantiated as a realistic amount toward a database endeavor.

=== Agon's legal position on move retransmission ===
Agon produced a legal position white paper (Shekhovtsov & Partners), asserting that chess fans should have to agree to terms and conditions that include not re-transmitting the moves elsewhere, before being allowed access. This is in line with a 2011 European Chess Union memo that produced a legal opinion from Morten Sand, indicating that contract law formed a superior basis for exploiting the chess audiences, with the expectation that viewers could be made to bear 75 euros (each) for the world championships, so that "the financial upside is huge" to generate 750000 euros.

=== Commentary from affected parties ===
The Bulgarian website Chessdom had the strongest editorial on the matter (from CEO Anton Mihailov), calling Agon's decision a multi-level blunder, even pointing out that Agon's decision actually violates Section 4.7.3.6.4.1 of the Candidates Regulations ("All live images, live broadcasting (Internet TV) pictures and all the other content for the full event details will be carried on the official domain [moscow2016.fide.com]. The organizer shall not develop any other website."). However, this item is enforceable only between Agon and FIDE. Their main thrust though, was:

Millions of fans will not learn about this year’s Candidates matches because of AGON’s policy. Many will miss the live coverage and only learn about the games after the tournament is over, when Carlsen’s challenger is known. What is the commercial value of that? Can you calculate how much are the lost benefits for the sponsors of the event? And for the hosts? And for the players? And for the sponsors of the players?

Additionally, Mihailov noted the lack of equality of arms in Agon's legal salvo: "With lawyer white paper threats you have cut any journalist’s right to properly cover the Candidates. While being with the law on their side, no sane journalist will risk losing time and/or money arguing with an organization." Two more articles were swiftly published, including a polemic against AGON's monopolistic agenda. Chessdom in the end did not broadcast live moves.

Chess.com had an article on the matter, couching their Candidates preview with "a remarkable decision by the organizers might well be the biggest story here", while noting that it personally "lacks the technology [for automated PGN relay] and always relies on volunteers to bring grandmaster games in Live Chess."

In the Norwegian press, Magnus Carlsen was nonchalant toward the kerfuffle, saying that everyone could just watch the Agon broadcast, with their comments and computer evaluations. However, NRK will also have move-by-move coverage on NRK.no, according to their own interview with him.

ChessBomb published that it would not use the Agon site due to non-agreement with terms and conditions, and asked for volunteers to seed their Tor setup (though later dropped this initiative). Implicitly, this relied on the fact that the clickwrap license presented by Agon (or World Chess Events Limited) may not in fact be valid in every viewer locale, so by allowing information to be obtained and retransmitted without contractual obligation. However, after a successful Round 1 broadcast, during Round 2 their live move transmissions were essentially halted, with looming legal threats.

=== Resulting effect ===
ChessBase ended up taking the threats seriously, which could have been to the dismay of Agon, as the official commentators (Alexandra Kosteniuk and Evgeny Miroshnichenko) were trying to use their software in Round 1. Instead, they had to switch to manual entry from ChessBomb. Alleged violators included not only ChessBomb and Chessdom, but also ICC, Chess24, and Der Spiegel. Although the Terms and Conditions (#10) mention New York state law as applicable to those who signed up, Merenzon sent a cease and desist letter that invoked 10 years imprisonment under Russian law. The specifying of choice of venue and choice of law in a contract of adhesion can also be in dispute.

Agon also impeded the credentials of Salim Fazulyanov, allegedly as retaliation against his website Kavkaz-Chess.ru for being the first Russian site to publish Chessdom's open letter.

Eventually Agon's own worldchess.com editorial staff broke ranks, declaring that an embargo was not the way to go, but a show. The main argument is: holding all the trumps like live video and exclusive interviews with players (and other VIPs) should be enough, without resorting to legal blusterings. Before Round 2, Agon partially relented, dispensing with its presumptory 2-hour PGN embargo, designating the game's end instead.

In round 1, the moves were carried live without restriction by official partner NRK. About 45 minutes into second round, the NRK live move transmission became suspended, causing other sites to also experience confusion. According to reporter Tarjei Svensen on Twitter, Agon was actively pursuing lawsuits against ChessBomb, Chess24, ICC, and ChessGames.com, with the chilling effect of causing them to essentially suspend activity. The Norwegian online newspaper site VG Direkte (also an official partner) initially stayed active (with the browsewrap language: "By viewing this page you expressly agree not to publish any information concerning the chess moves of the candidates tournament 2016 chess games until the end of such game"), but then also suspended activity. Der Spiegel continued its live ticker of Aronian-Anand analysis throughout.

==== Legal action and media coverage ====
After Round 2, Agon officially announced its rumored legal action against the above four broadcasters.

The Guardian newspaper covered an exposé of the ruckus, noting that Agon's tactics may be hoping to at least scare off its rivals and keep the big prize (coverage of the World Championship match with Carlsen) to itself. Vladimir Kramnik was quoted from an ensuing interview as saying: "If you want to make chess professional, if you want to help chess to grow, you have to understand very clearly that the organiser of any chess tournament has full transmission rights. Because the organiser has invested a lot of money and effort to organise the tournament, morally and legally they have full rights over the live transmission." Kramnik contended such control was the way football, tennis and other sports had become successful, and by doing the same, chess could jump to a totally different level. He also imposed his own view upon any end user's opinion of the coverage, declaring that "no one is suffering" from Agon's decision. Top organizer Stuart Conquest was also quoted: "However you look at it, pretty clear that start of Candidates has been a PR [press relations] disaster for organisers / Agon / FIDE."

==== Round 3 and beyond ====
ChessBomb's whole site went down (due to a component upgrade gone wrong) 10 minutes into Round 3 without any moves having been shown, while Chess24 intermittently carried the moves of two of the four games (Giri–Karjakin and Nakamura–Svidler) in the early going. Chessgames.com similarly had Giri–Karjakin, while Der Spiegel had the Anand–Caruana game on their live ticker. After rectification 10 minutes later, ChessBomb had all three of the above-mentioned games, and Chess24 quickly added Anand–Caruana also.

By round 4 the immediate frenzy appeared to have dissipated, as Grandmaster David Smerdon was given an all-clear from Agon (or World Chess Events Limited) to run a live blog. However, the main sites were still lagging in their relays by about 20–25 minutes during the opening moves. The (Agon affiliated) sites NRK and VG Direkte relayed the games with a delay of about 20 minutes. Later, at approximately an hour into the games, the alternative feeds were nearly keeping pace with Agon's site, though some slowdown sporadically remained. Agon boasted that PGNs were now going to be available as Flash Reports within minutes of the finish of each game. Their own onsite live commentators were still having problems getting the moves to the games at some junctures. Renowned trainer Mark Dvoretsky was deeply unsympathetic to Agon's position, particularly as the official site was so inconvenient to use, and he also mentioned the privacy issues with the necessity of registering there.

==== After the tournament ====
Agon, through a company called Turnir Pretendentov LLC (the name meaning 'Candidates Tournament' in Russian) attempted to sue eLearning Ltd. for 20 million roubles, for the live broadcasting of the moves of the Candidates Tournament on chess24.com. Agon's legal claim was rejected in its entirety on 25 October 2016. Agon are also suing ChessGames and ChessBomb; the final hearings in these cases are due to take place on 17 January 2017 and 28 February 2017 respectively.
