= Dénes Boros =

Hungarian chess grandmaster (born 1988)

Personal information
- Born: April 30, 1988 (age 38) Budapest, Hungary

Chess career
- Country: Hungary
- Title: Grandmaster (2009)
- Peak rating: 2513 (November 2010)

Dénes Boros is a Hungarian chess grandmaster.

== Chess career ==
He played for Hungary in the European Boys’ U18 Team Chess Championships of 2002, 2003, and 2006.

He achieved the Grandmaster title in 2009, earning his norms at the:

- First Saturday GM tournament in September 2006
- Balatonlelle Chess Festival GM tournament in June 2007
- First Saturday GM tournament in September 2009

He is also a chess journalist for American Chess Magazine and US Chess, serving as a special commentator for the World Chess Championship 2016.

== Personal life ==
He studied psychology at Webster University and played on the university's winning team in the February 2012 SW Collegiate Championship.
