= Fulton Market Building =

Coordinates: 40°42′24″N 74°00′10″W

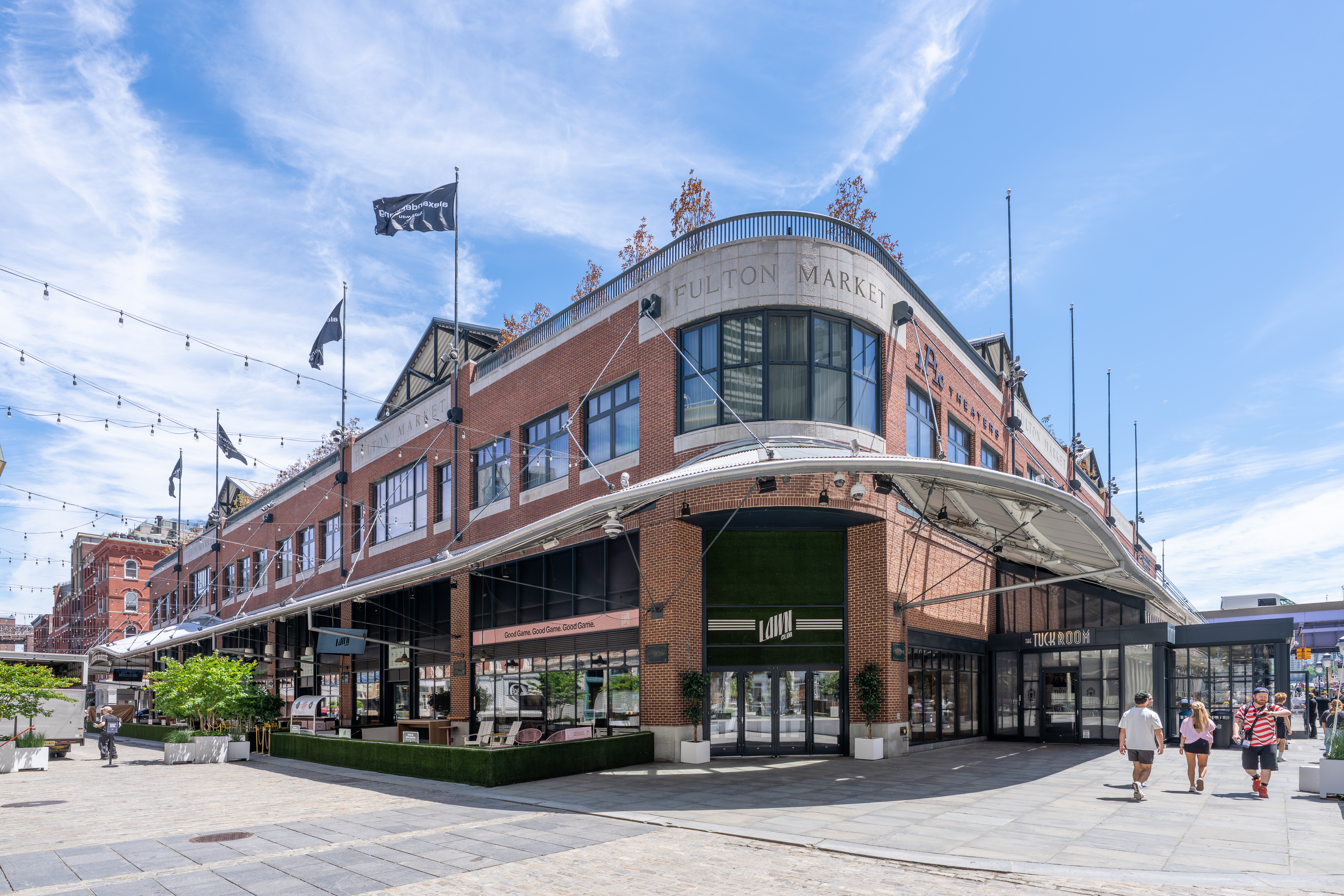
- Looking east across Fulton Street (2026)
- Interactive map of the Fulton Market Building area

General information
- Location: 11 Fulton Street; Manhattan, New York 10038

The Fulton Market Building is a renovated building that once housed the Fulton Fish Market, on Fulton Street in the Financial District of Lower Manhattan. It was the venue for the 2016 World Chess Championship.
