= Central Telegraph =

Russian telecommunications company

- Company type: Public Joint Stock Company
- Traded as: MCX: CNTL
- Industry: Telecommunications
- Founded: 1852
- Headquarters: Moscow, Russia
- Revenue: $44.9 million (2016)
- Operating income: $1.47 million (2016)
- Net income: $1.02 million (2016)
- Total assets: $48.4 million (2016)
- Total equity: $31.9 million (2016)
- Parent: Rostelecom
- Website: Official website

PJSC Central Telegraph (Russian: Центральный телеграф) is a Russian telecommunications company which provides different services such as fixed line telephony and internet access, IPTV, rental of communication channels, electrical documentation, integrated business solutions such as IP PBX and video surveillance. The company is active mainly in Moscow. It is owned 100% by Rostelecom.

== History ==
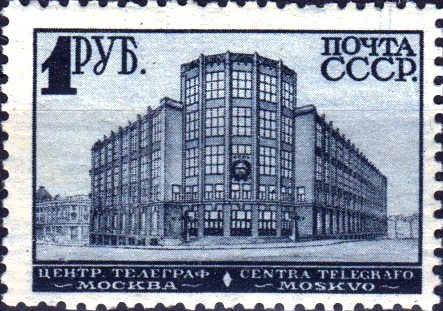
Central Telegraph building on a 1930 USSR stamp

Central Telegraph dates back to 1 October 1852, the date of establishment of the first telegraph station in Moscow in the station building of the Petersburg-Moscow railway.

Since 1870, the telegraph station at Myasnitskaya Ulitsa became known as the Moscow telegraph station (with respect to opening the city's cable station, the number of which reached 33 by 1880).

In 1998, the company began a project to create a digital transport network, which has become the technology platform for the development of communication services "Central Telegraph". Under this project, the company has been allocated resource numbering capacity to connect subscribers: 213.5 thousand telephone numbers in the code "095", which was replaced by the code "495", 50 thousand rooms - in the code "499" in Moscow, and also 100 thousand numbers in the code "498" in the Moscow region. In 1999 the company began providing digital telephone services to subscribers in Moscow.

== Directors ==
CEO - Nechaev Evgeny Alexandrovich (for 2024).
