= FIDE Grand Prix 2014–15 =

Chess tournament series

FIDE Grand Prix Series 2014–15
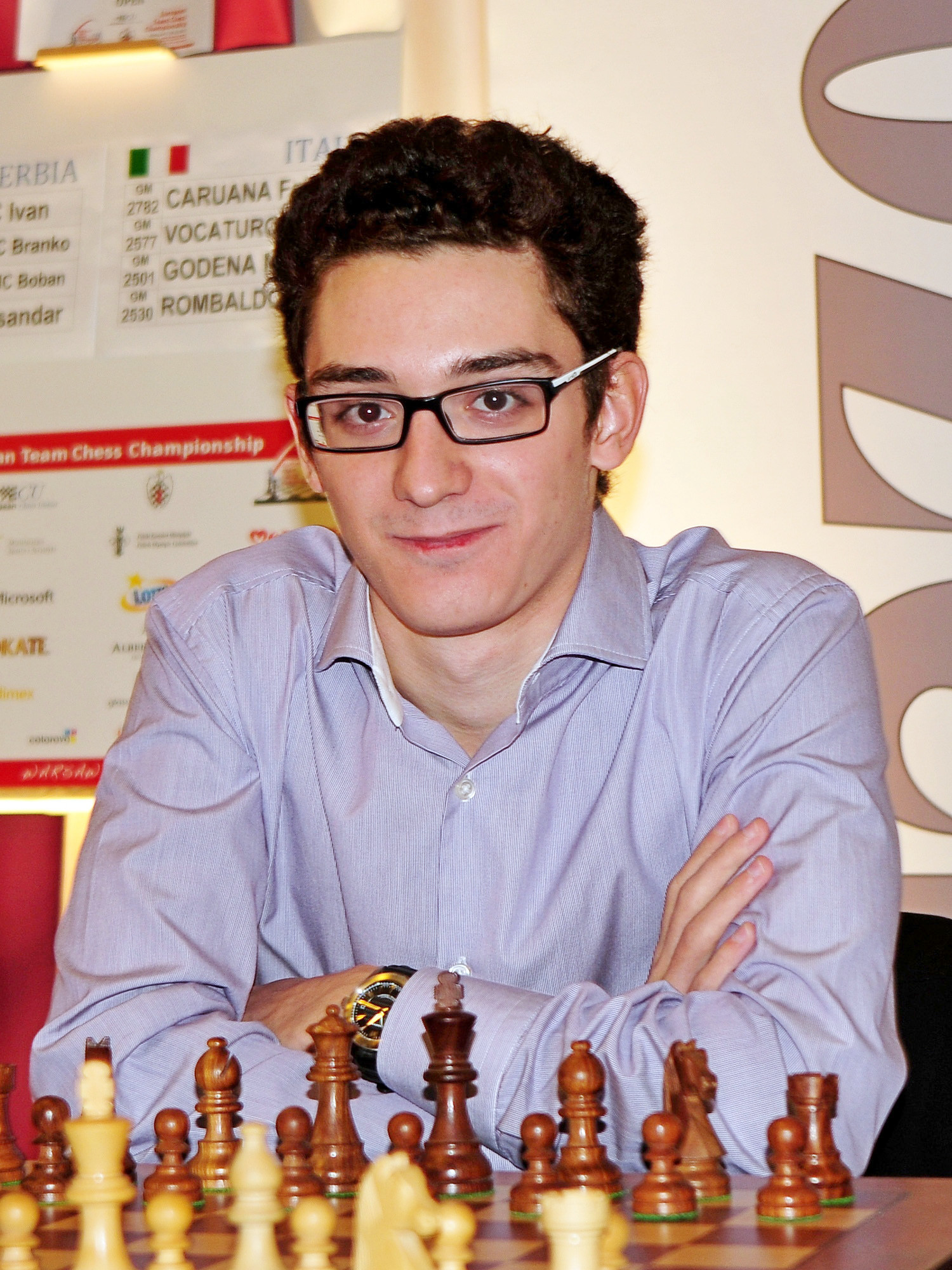
- FIDE Grand Prix 2014–15 winner Fabiano Caruana

Tournament information
- Sport: Chess
- Location: (Azerbaijan) Baku (Uzbekistan) Tashkent (Georgia (country)) Tbilisi (Russia) Khanty-Mansiysk
- Dates: 1 October 2014– 26 May 2015
- Administrator: FIDE
- Tournament format(s): Series of round-robin tournaments
- Venue(s): Cultural Event Center in Baku; Art Gallery of Uzbekistan; Courtyard by Marriott Tbilisi; Ugra Chess Academy

Final positions
- Champion: (Italy) Fabiano Caruana
- Runner-up: (United States) Hikaru Nakamura

Tournament 1
- Location: Baku
- Dates: 1–15 October 2014
- Champion: Fabiano Caruana; Boris Gelfand

Tournament 2
- Location: Tashkent
- Dates: 20 October – 3 November 2014
- Champion: Dmitry Andreikin
- Runner-up: Shakriyar Mamedyarov; Hikaru Nakamura

Tournament 3
- Location: Tbilisi
- Dates: 14–28 February 2015
- Champion: Evgeny Tomashevsky
- Runner-up: Dmitry Jakovenko

Tournament 4
- Location: Khanty-Mansiysk
- Dates: 14–26 May 2015
- Champion: Hikaru Nakamura; Fabiano Caruana; Dmitry Jakovenko

The FIDE Grand Prix 2014–15 was a series of four chess tournaments that formed part of the qualification cycle for the World Chess Championship 2016. Fabiano Caruana finished first, and Hikaru Nakamura second in the overall standings. Both therefore qualified for the Candidates Tournament 2016.

== Format ==
In contrast to the two previous Grand Prix cycles, the number of tournaments was decreased from six to four, and players played three tournaments instead of four. As a result, no results were discarded, but each tournament result counted toward the total points. Sixteen players were selected to compete in the tournaments.

Each tournament was a 12-player, single round-robin tournament. In each round players scored 1 point for a win, ½ point for a draw and 0 for a loss. Grand Prix points were then allocated according to each player's standing in the tournament: 170 Grand Prix points for first place, 140 for second place, 110 for third place, and then 90 down to 10 points by steps of 10. In case of a tie in points the Grand Prix points were shared evenly by the tied players.

== Players ==
The Grand Prix consisted of 16 players. FIDE announced 11 qualifiers as per regulations, plus one nominee from each of the four organisers, and one FIDE President nominee.

Five original invitees declined to participate: Magnus Carlsen, Viswanathan Anand, Levon Aronian, Vladimir Kramnik and Veselin Topalov. The first four of these had also declined to participate in the FIDE Grand Prix 2012–13. In a later interview, Aronian said "I found it quite insulting to compete in a tournament with the first prize half as large as my participation fee [for] almost any other tournament [at] that time." Moreover, there was no prize money for overall standings, as there had been in previous editions.

All five Grand Prix replacements were determined by the rating list as per regulations.

The final list of players was announced on 9 September 2014. Iranian player Ehsan Ghaem-Maghami was replaced by Georgian Baadur Jobava after the third stop was moved from Tehran to Tbilisi.

Invitee	Country	Qualifying method
Dmitry Andreikin	Russia	Chess World Cup 2013
Evgeny Tomashevsky	Russia	Chess World Cup 2013
Maxime Vachier-Lagrave	France	Chess World Cup 2013
Fabiano Caruana	Italy	FIDE rating list (from May 2013 to April 2014)
Alexander Grischuk	Russia	FIDE rating list (from May 2013 to April 2014)
Hikaru Nakamura	United States	FIDE rating list (from May 2013 to April 2014)
Sergey Karjakin	Russia	FIDE rating list (from May 2013 to April 2014)
Leinier Domínguez	Cuba	FIDE rating list (from May 2013 to April 2014)
Shakhriyar Mamedyarov	Azerbaijan	FIDE rating list (from May 2013 to April 2014)
Boris Gelfand	Israel	FIDE rating list (from May 2013 to April 2014)
Peter Svidler	Russia	FIDE rating list (from May 2013 to April 2014)
Dmitry Jakovenko	Russia	organiser's nominees
Teimour Radjabov	Azerbaijan	organiser's nominees
Rustam Kasimdzhanov	Uzbekistan	organiser's nominees
Baadur Jobava	Georgia	organiser's nominees
Anish Giri	Netherlands	FIDE President's nominee

== Prize money and Grand Prix points ==
The prize money was €120,000 per single Grand Prix (down from €170,000) and there was no financial bonus for the overall standings (€420,000 last in 2012–13).

Place	Single Grand Prix event	Grand Prix points
1	€20,000	170
2	€15,000	140
3	€13,000	110
4	€11,000	90
5	€10,000	80
6	€9,500	70
7	€9,000	60
8	€8,500	50
9	€7,500	40
10	€6,500	30
11	€5,500	20
12	€4,500	10

== Tie breaks ==
With the objective of determining qualifiers to play in the Candidates Tournament 2016, and in the case that two or more players had equal cumulative points at the top, the following criteria were utilized to decide the overall Series winner and other overall placings:

1. Number of actual game result points scored in the three tournaments entered.
2. Number of games played with black.
3. Number of wins.
4. Number of black wins.
5. Drawing of lots.

== Schedule ==
The third stop was initially to be played in Tehran, Iran but a move was announced in October. The fourth stop moved from Moscow to Khanty-Mansiysk.

No.	Host city	Date
1	Baku, Azerbaijan	1–15 October 2014
2	Tashkent, Uzbekistan	20 October – 3 November 2014
3	Tbilisi, Georgia	14–28 February 2015
4	Khanty-Mansiysk, Russia	14–26 May 2015

== Events crosstables ==
=== Baku 2014 ===
1st stage, Baku, Azerbaijan, 1–15 October 2014
	Player	Rating	1	2	3	4	5	6	7	8	9	10	11	12	Total	SB	TPR	GP
1	Boris Gelfand (ISR)	2748	*	½	½	½	1	½	½	1	0	½	1	½	6½	35.25	2816	155
2	Fabiano Caruana (ITA)	2844	½	*	½	½	0	1	1	½	1	½	0	1	6½	34.50	2808	155
3	Evgeny Tomashevsky (RUS)	2701	½	½	*	½	½	½	½	½	½	½	1	½	6	32.25	2788	82
4	Hikaru Nakamura (USA)	2764	½	½	½	*	½	0	½	½	½	1	1	½	6	31.75	2782	82
5	Alexander Grischuk (RUS)	2797	0	1	½	½	*	½	½	0	½	1	½	1	6	31.25	2780	82
6	Sergey Karjakin (RUS)	2767	½	0	½	1	½	*	½	½	½	½	½	1	6	31.25	2782	82
7	Peter Svidler (RUS)	2732	½	0	½	½	½	½	*	½	1	½	½	1	6	30.75	2785	82
8	Teimour Radjabov (AZE)	2726	0	½	½	½	1	½	½	*	½	½	½	½	5½		2754	50
9	Shakhriyar Mamedyarov (AZE)	2764	1	0	½	½	½	½	0	½	*	½	½	½	5	27.50	2720	35
10	Rustam Kasimdzhanov (UZB)	2706	½	½	½	0	0	½	½	½	½	*	1	½	5	26.75	2724	35
11	Dmitry Andreikin (RUS)	2722	0	1	0	0	½	½	½	½	½	0	*	1	4½		2691	20
12	Leinier Domínguez (CUB)	2751	½	0	½	½	0	0	0	½	½	½	0	*	3		2582	10

=== Tashkent 2014 ===
2nd stage, Tashkent, Uzbekistan, 20 October – 3 November 2014
	Player	Rating	1	2	3	4	5	6	7	8	9	10	11	12	Total	SB	TPR	GP
1	Dmitry Andreikin (RUS)	2722	*	½	1	½	½	1	1	½	½	½	½	½	7		2852	170
2	Hikaru Nakamura (USA)	2764	½	*	½	½	½	½	1	½	½	½	½	1	6½	34.50	2815	125
3	Shakhriyar Mamedyarov (AZE)	2764	0	½	*	½	½	½	½	½	½	1	1	1	6½	32.00	2815	125
4	Maxime Vachier-Lagrave (FRA)	2757	½	½	½	*	1	½	½	½	½	0	1	½	6	32.50	2783	75
5	Fabiano Caruana (ITA)	2844	½	½	½	0	*	½	½	½	½	1	½	1	6	31.00	2776	75
6	Sergey Karjakin (RUS)	2767	0	½	½	½	½	*	0	½	1	1	1	½	6	30.00	2782	75
7	Baadur Jobava (GEO)	2717	0	0	½	½	½	1	*	½	½	½	1	1	6	29.75	2787	75
8	Teimour Radjabov (AZE)	2726	½	½	½	½	½	½	½	*	½	½	½	½	5½		2754	50
9	Anish Giri (NED)	2768	½	½	½	½	½	0	½	½	*	½	½	½	5		2720	40
10	Dmitry Jakovenko (RUS)	2747	½	½	0	1	0	0	½	½	½	*	½	½	4½		2690	30
11	Rustam Kasimdzhanov (UZB)	2706	½	½	0	0	½	0	0	½	½	½	*	½	3½	19.00	2625	15
12	Boris Gelfand (ISR)	2748	½	0	0	½	0	½	0	½	½	½	½	*	3½	18.75	2621	15

=== Tbilisi 2015 ===
3rd stage, Tbilisi, Georgia, 14–28 February 2015
	Player	Rating	1	2	3	4	5	6	7	8	9	10	11	12	Total	SB	TPR	GP
1	Evgeny Tomashevsky (RUS)	2716	*	½	½	½	½	1	1	1	1	1	½	½	8		2916	170
2	Dmitry Jakovenko (RUS)	2733	½	*	½	½	1	½	½	½	1	½	½	½	6½		2808	140
3	Teimour Radjabov (AZE)	2731	½	½	*	½	½	½	½	1	½	½	½	½	6		2776	110
4	Leinier Domínguez (CUB)	2726	½	½	½	*	½	½	½	½	0	½	½	1	5½	29.75	2745	75
5	Anish Giri (NED)	2797	½	0	½	½	*	½	½	½	½	½	1	½	5½	29.25	2739	75
6	Shakhriyar Mamedyarov (AZE)	2759	0	½	½	½	½	*	0	1	0	1	½	1	5½	28.75	2747	75
7	Rustam Kasimdzhanov (UZB)	2705	0	½	½	½	½	1	*	0	½	½	1	½	5½	28.00	2743	75
8	Alexander Grischuk (RUS)	2810	0	½	0	½	½	0	1	*	1	½	½	½	5	26.25	2710	40
9	Baadur Jobava (GEO)	2696	0	0	½	1	½	1	½	0	*	0	1	½	5	26.00	2706	40
10	Maxime Vachier-Lagrave (FRA)	2775	0	½	½	½	½	0	½	½	1	*	½	½	5	26.00	2716	40
11	Peter Svidler (RUS)	2739	½	½	½	½	0	0	0	½	½	½	*	1	4½		2681	20
12	Dmitry Andreikin (RUS)	2737	½	½	½	0	½	0	½	½	½	½	0	*	4		2648	10

=== Khanty-Mansiysk 2015 ===
4th stage, Khanty-Mansiysk, Russia, 14–26 May 2015
	Player	Rating	1	2	3	4	5	6	7	8	9	10	11	12	Total	SB	TPR	GP
1	Dmitry Jakovenko (RUS)	2738	*	½	1	0	½	0	½	1	1	½	½	1	6½			140
2	Hikaru Nakamura (USA)	2799	½	*	½	½	½	½	½	½	½	½	1	1	6½			140
3	Fabiano Caruana (ITA)	2803	0	½	*	½	½	½	1	½	½	1	½	1	6½			140
4	Leinier Domínguez (CUB)	2734	1	½	½	*	½	1	½	½	½	½	0	½	6			85
5	Boris Gelfand (ISR)	2744	½	½	½	½	*	1	½	½	½	½	½	½	6			85
6	Peter Svidler (RUS)	2734	1	½	½	0	0	*	½	1	½	0	1	½	5½			55
7	Alexander Grischuk (RUS)	2780	½	½	0	½	½	½	*	½	1	½	½	½	5½			55
8	Anish Giri (NED)	2776	0	½	½	½	½	0	½	*	½	1	1	½	5½			55
9	Sergey Karjakin (RUS)	2753	0	½	½	½	½	½	0	½	*	1	½	1	5½			55
10	Evgeny Tomashevsky (RUS)	2749	½	½	0	½	½	1	½	0	0	*	1	½	5			30
11	Baadur Jobava (GEO)	2699	½	0	½	1	½	0	½	0	½	0	*	½	4			20
12	Maxime Vachier-Lagrave (FRA)	2754	0	0	0	½	½	½	½	½	0	½	½	*	3½			10

== Grand Prix standings ==
Grand Prix points in bold indicate a tournament win. Green indicates qualifiers of the 2016 Candidates Tournament

	Player	FIDE rating May 2015	Baku	Tashkent	Tbilisi	Khanty- Mansiysk	Total
1	Fabiano Caruana (ITA)	2803	**155**	75		**140**	370
2	Hikaru Nakamura (USA)	2799	82	125		**140**	347
3	Dmitry Jakovenko (RUS)	2738		30	140	**140**	310
4	Evgeny Tomashevsky (RUS)	2749	82		**170**	30	282
5	Boris Gelfand (ISR)	2744	**155**	15		85	255
6	Shakhriyar Mamedyarov (AZE)	2735	35	125	75		235
7	Sergey Karjakin (RUS)	2753	82	75		55	212
8	Teimour Radjabov (AZE)	2738	50	50	110		210
9	Dmitry Andreikin (RUS)	2723	20	**170**	10		200
10	Alexander Grischuk (RUS)	2780	82		40	55	177
11	Leinier Domínguez (CUB)	2734	10		75	85	170
12	Anish Giri (NED)	2776		40	75	55	170
13	Peter Svidler (RUS)	2734	82		20	55	157
14	Baadur Jobava (GEO)	2699		75	40	20	135
15	Maxime Vachier-Lagrave (FRA)	2754		75	40	10	125
16	Rustam Kasimdzhanov (UZB)	2715	35	15	75		125
