= World Chess Championship 2016 =

Chess match between Magnus Carlsen and Sergey Karjakin

- Fulton Market Building, New York City, United States
- 11–30 November 2016
	Defending champion	Challenger
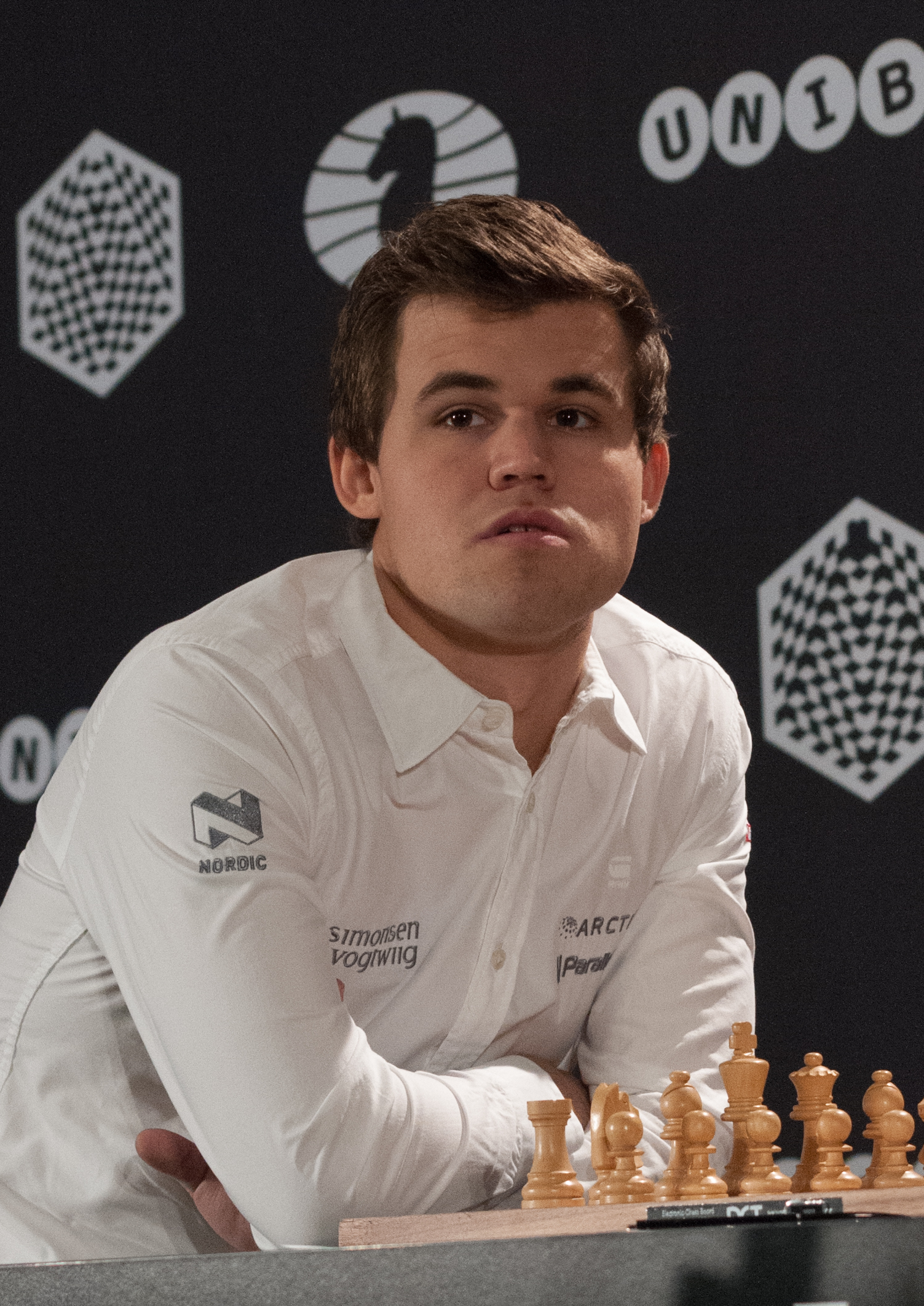
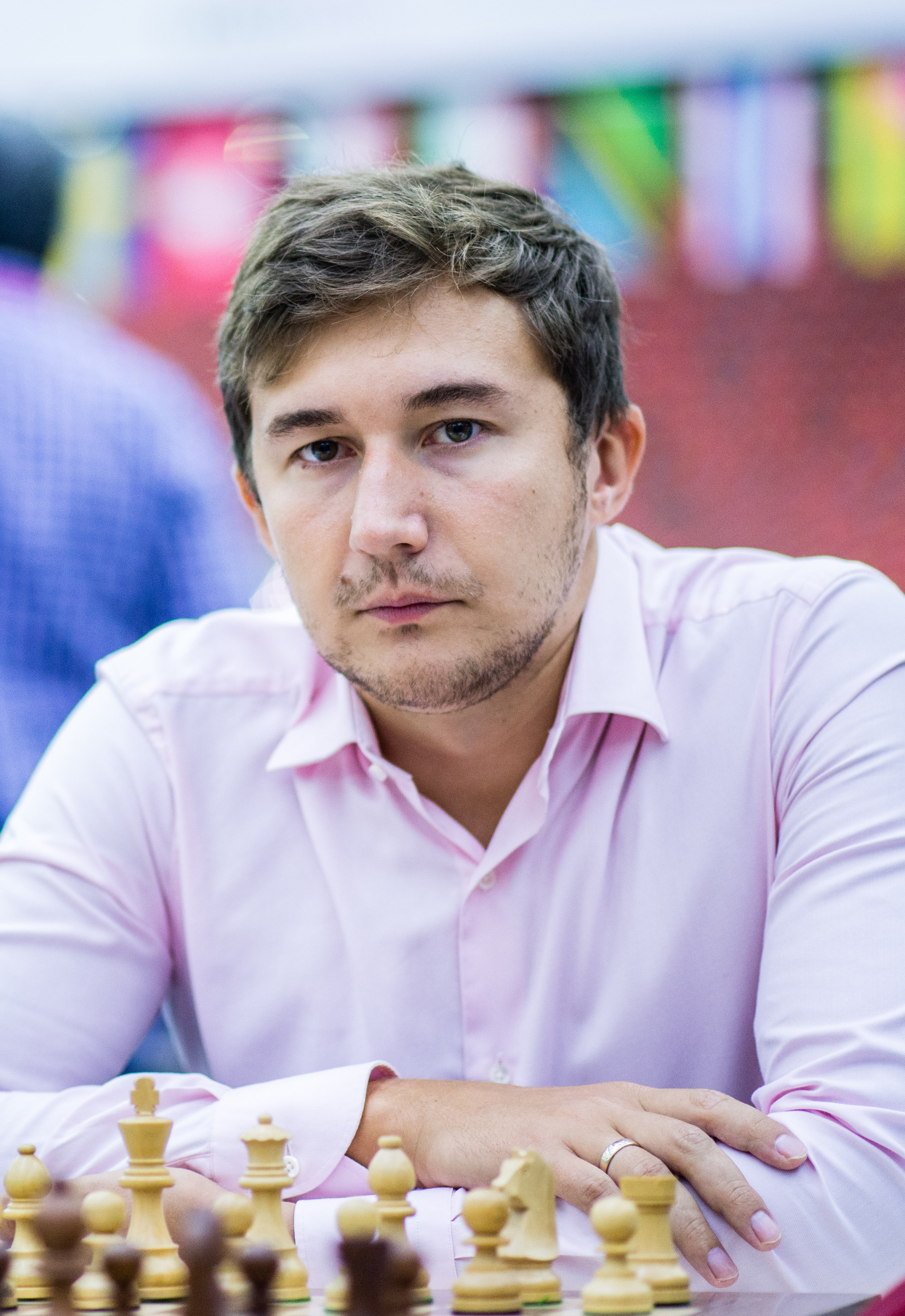
	Magnus Carlsen	Sergey Karjakin
	(Norway) Magnus Carlsen	(Russia) Sergey Karjakin
6 (3)	Scores	6 (1)
	Born 30 November 1990; 25 years old	Born 12 January 1990; 26 years old
	Winner of the World Chess Championship 2014	Winner of the Candidates Tournament 2016
	Rating: 2853 (World No. 1)	Rating: 2772 (World No. 9)

The World Chess Championship 2016 was a chess match between the reigning world champion Magnus Carlsen and the challenger Sergey Karjakin to determine the World Chess Champion. Carlsen had been world champion since 2013, while Karjakin qualified as challenger by winning the 2016 Candidates Tournament. The best-of-12 match, organized by FIDE and its commercial partner World Chess (former Agon), was played in New York City between 10 and 30 November 2016.

The match opened with seven consecutive draws before Karjakin won the eighth game. Carlsen evened the score by winning the tenth game. All other games were drawn, leaving the match at a 6–6 tie, so tie breaks decided the match. After two draws to begin the rapid chess tie break, Carlsen won the remaining two games to win the match and retain his title.

Position: c8 white rook, e7 black bishop, f7 black pawn, g7 black pawn, h7 black king, b6 black pawn, d6 black pawn, h6 white queen, f5 white rook, h5 white pawn, e4 white pawn, f3 white pawn, a2 black rook, f2 black queen, h2 white pawn, h1 white king

Final position after 50.Qh6+!! in the final tie-break game. Carlsen's sham queen sacrifice forces mate next move: 50...Kxh6 51.Rh8# or 50...gxh6 51.Rxf7#.

== Planning timeline ==
- 27 November, 2014: At the closing ceremony for the 2014 championship, FIDE president Ilyumzhinov announces the 2016 match will take place in the United States.
- 4 October, 2015: At the 2015 Chess World Cup, Ilyumzhinov reiterates the location as the United States, saying that the date and place were already final.
- 15 December, 2015: FIDE and Agon sign media rights deal with Norwegian broadcaster NRK, listing 7-figures (in unknown currency) until 2020.
- 8 January, 2016: FIDE announces that Agon has made operational an official broadcasting platform (worldchess.com) for the World Chess Championship cycle events (already present in October 2015).
- 1 March, 2016: Agon announce that the city will be New York City, with approval from its mayor.
- 4 March, 2016: Agon announce that only approved broadcasters will be allowed to retransmit moves from the Candidates and ensuing World Championship.
- 28 March, 2016: Sergey Karjakin wins the Candidates Tournament 2016 to qualify to play Magnus Carlsen.
- 26 May, 2016: Agon head Ilya Merenzon says that "The contract between FIDE and Agon is finalized and is being signed. The contract between the players and FIDE will be finalized in the next 2–3 weeks."
- 7 June, 2016: Agon announces that a venue has been found in New York City, with only sponsor details and paperwork left to be finalized in the next 2 weeks.
- 8 August, 2016: Agon announce the venue as the Fulton Market building in the South Street Seaport in lower Manhattan.
- 30 August, 2016: Agon publish on their website that PhosAgro has signed a strategic partnership contract as a sponsor of the 2016 FIDE World Chess Championship.
- 12 September, 2016: Agon announce EG Capital Advisors as a sponsor, and give pricing packages for virtual reality viewing options.
- 30 September, 2016: Tickets go on sale. The lowest price listed is $75 per game.
- 17 October, 2016: Agon announce their new broadcast model for the World Championship.

== Candidates Tournament ==
The Candidates Tournament to determine the challenger was held on 11–30 March 2016 in Moscow, Russia, with FIDE's commercial partner Agon as the official organizer, with support from the Russian Chess Federation. The tournament was an 8-player double round-robin, with five different qualification paths possible: the loser of the World Chess Championship 2014 match, the top two finishers in the Chess World Cup 2015, the top two finishers in the FIDE Grand Prix 2014–15, next two highest rated players (average FIDE rating on the 12 monthly lists from January to December 2015, with at least 30 games played) who played in Chess World Cup 2015 or FIDE Grand Prix 2014–15, and one player nominated by Agon (the organizers).

=== Qualified players ===
Qualification path	Player	Age	Rating	Rank
runners up of the World Chess Championship 2014 match	(India) Viswanathan Anand	46	2762	12
Winner of the Chess World Cup 2015	(Russia) Sergey Karjakin	26	2760	13
Runner-up of the Chess World Cup 2015	(Russia) Peter Svidler	39	2757	16
The top two finishers in the FIDE Grand Prix 2014–15	(United States) (Italy) Fabiano Caruana	23	2794	3
The top two finishers in the FIDE Grand Prix 2014–15	(United States) Hikaru Nakamura	28	2790	6
The top two players with highest average 2015 rating who played in World Cup or Grand Prix	(Bulgaria) Veselin Topalov	41	2780	8
The top two players with highest average 2015 rating who played in World Cup or Grand Prix	(Netherlands) Anish Giri	21	2793	4
Wild card nomination of the organizers (Agon), with FIDE rating in July 2015 at least 2725	(Armenia) Levon Aronian	33	2786	7

=== Standings ===
Pos	Player	Pld	W	D	L	Pts	Qualification	KAR	CAR	ANA	SVI	ARO	GIR	NAK	TOP
1	Sergey Karjakin (RUS) (Q)	14	4	9	1	8.5	Advance to title match	—	1 ½	1 0	½ ½	½ ½	½ ½	1 ½	1 ½
2	Fabiano Caruana (USA)	14	2	11	1	7.5		½ 0	—	1 ½	½ ½	½ ½	½ ½	1 ½	½ ½
3	Viswanathan Anand (IND)	14	4	7	3	7.5		1 0	½ 0	—	1 ½	1 ½	½ ½	½ 0	1 ½
4	Peter Svidler (RUS)	14	1	12	1	7		½ ½	½ ½	½ 0	—	½ 1	½ ½	½ ½	½ ½
5	Levon Aronian (ARM)	14	2	10	2	7		½ ½	½ ½	½ 0	0 ½	—	½ ½	1 ½	½ 1
6	Anish Giri (NED)	14	0	14	0	7		½ ½	½ ½	½ ½	½ ½	½ ½	—	½ ½	½ ½
7	Hikaru Nakamura (USA)	14	3	8	3	7		½ 0	½ 0	1 ½	½ ½	½ 0	½ ½	—	1 1
8	Veselin Topalov (BUL)	14	0	9	5	4.5		½ 0	½ ½	½ 0	½ ½	0 ½	½ ½	0 0	—

Source: moscow2016.fide.com
(Q) Qualified for the phase indicated

=== Results by round ===
Pairings and results

Numbers in parentheses indicate players' scores prior to the round.

Round 1 – 11 March 2016
Viswanathan Anand	Veselin Topalov	1–0	C65 Ruy Lopez, Berlin Defence
Anish Giri	Levon Aronian	½–½	D37 Queen's Gambit Declined
Sergey Karjakin	Peter Svidler	½–½	D16 Slav Defence, Soultanbéieff Variation
Hikaru Nakamura	Fabiano Caruana	½–½	A30 English Opening, Symmetrical Variation
Round 2 – 12 March 2016
Levon Aronian (½)	Viswanathan Anand (1)	½–½	D37 Queen's Gambit Declined
Fabiano Caruana (½)	Anish Giri (½)	½–½	B32 Ruy Lopez, Berlin Defence
Sergey Karjakin (½)	Hikaru Nakamura (½)	1–0	E15 Queen's Indian Defence, Fianchetto Variation, Check Variation, Intermezzo Line
Peter Svidler (½)	Veselin Topalov (0)	½–½	C67 Ruy Lopez, Berlin Defence
Round 3 – 13 March 2016
Viswanathan Anand (1½)	Fabiano Caruana (1)	½–½	C65 Ruy Lopez, Berlin Defence
Anish Giri (1)	Sergey Karjakin (1½)	½–½	E15 Queen's Indian Defence, Fianchetto Variation, Check Variation, Intermezzo Line
Hikaru Nakamura (½)	Peter Svidler (1)	½–½	D16 Slav Defence, Soultanbéieff Variation
Veselin Topalov (½)	Levon Aronian (1)	0–1	A29 English, Four Knights, Kingside Fianchetto
Round 4 – 15 March 2016
Fabiano Caruana (1½)	Veselin Topalov (½)	½–½	C50 Giuoco Piano
Sergey Karjakin (2)	Viswanathan Anand (2)	1–0	A06 Réti Opening
Hikaru Nakamura (1)	Anish Giri (1½)	½–½	D45 Semi-Slav, Stoltz Variation
Peter Svidler (1½)	Levon Aronian (2)	½–½	A22 English, Four Knights, Smyslov System
Round 5 – 16 March 2016
Viswanathan Anand (2)	Hikaru Nakamura (1½)	½–½	C65 Ruy Lopez, Berlin Defence
Levon Aronian (2½)	Fabiano Caruana (2)	½–½	A77 Benoni Defence, Classical, Czerniak Defence, Tal Line
Anish Giri (2)	Peter Svidler (2)	½–½	D73 Neo-Grünfeld Defence
Veselin Topalov (1)	Sergey Karjakin (3)	½–½	E15 Queen's Indian Defence, Fianchetto Variation, Check Variation, Intermezzo Line
Round 6 – 17 March 2016
Viswanathan Anand (2½)	Peter Svidler (2½)	1–0	C88 Ruy Lopez, Closed, Anti-Marshall 8.a4
Veselin Topalov (1½)	Anish Giri (2½)	½–½	E61 Indian Game, West Indian Defence
Levon Aronian (3)	Hikaru Nakamura (2)	1–0	E15 Queen's Indian Defence, Fianchetto Variation, Nimzowistch Variation
Fabiano Caruana (2½)	Sergey Karjakin (3½)	½–½	E15 Queen's Indian Defence, Fianchetto Variation, Check Variation, Intermezzo Line
Round 7 – 19 March 2016
Peter Svidler (2½)	Fabiano Caruana (3)	½–½	A35 English, Symmetrical, Four Knights
Sergey Karjakin (4)	Levon Aronian (4)	½–½	A08 King's Indian Attack
Hikaru Nakamura (2)	Veselin Topalov (2)	1–0	D12 Slav Defence, Quiet Variation, Schallop Defence
Anish Giri (3)	Viswanathan Anand (3½)	½–½	D37 Queen's Gambit Declined, Barmen Variation

Round 8 – 20 March 2016
Peter Svidler (3)	Sergey Karjakin (4½)	½–½	A29 English, Four Knights, Fianchetto Line
Fabiano Caruana (3½)	Hikaru Nakamura (3)	1–0	C65 Ruy Lopez, Berlin Defence
Levon Aronian (4½)	Anish Giri (3½)	½–½	D43 Semi-Slav Defense
Veselin Topalov (2)	Viswanathan Anand (4)	½–½	A11 Queen's Gambit Declined, Barmen Variation
Round 9 – 21 March 2016
Veselin Topalov (2½)	Peter Svidler (3½)	½–½	C88 Ruy Lopez, Closed, Anti-Marshall 8.a4
Viswanathan Anand (4½)	Levon Aronian (5)	1–0	C50 Giuoco Piano
Anish Giri (4)	Fabiano Caruana (4½)	½–½	D70 Neo-Grünfeld Defence, Goglidze Attack
Hikaru Nakamura (3)	Sergey Karjakin (5)	½–½	E15 Queen's Indian Defence, Fianchetto Variation, Check Variation, Intermezzo Line
Round 10 – 23 March 2016
Peter Svidler (4)	Hikaru Nakamura (3½)	½–½	A29 English, Four Knights, Fianchetto Line
Sergey Karjakin (5½)	Anish Giri (4½)	½–½	D45f Semi-Slav, Stoltz Variation
Fabiano Caruana (5)	Viswanathan Anand (5½)	1–0	A29 English, Four Knights, Fianchetto Line
Levon Aronian (5)	Veselin Topalov (3)	½–½	A29 English, Four Knights, Fianchetto Line
Round 11 – 24 March 2016
Levon Aronian (5½)	Peter Svidler (4½)	0–1	D16 Slav Defence, Soultanbéieff Variation
Veselin Topalov (3½)	Fabiano Caruana (6)	½–½	A33 English, Symmetrical, Anti-Benoni
Viswanathan Anand (5½)	Sergey Karjakin (6)	1–0	A07 Ruy Lopez, Berlin Defence
Anish Giri (5)	Hikaru Nakamura (4)	½–½	C50 Giuoco Piano
Round 12 – 25 March 2016
Peter Svidler (5½)	Anish Giri (5½)	½–½	A29 English, Four Knights, Fianchetto Line
Hikaru Nakamura (4½)	Viswanathan Anand (6½)	1–0	A29 English, Four Knights, Fianchetto Line
Sergey Karjakin (6)	Veselin Topalov (4)	1–0	B90 Sicilian Defence, Najdorf Variation, Adams Attack
Fabiano Caruana (6½)	Levon Aronian (5½)	½–½	C78 Ruy Lopez, Closed, Martinez Variation
Round 13 – 27 March 2016
Fabiano Caruana (7)	Peter Svidler (6)	½–½	C78 Ruy Lopez, Closed, Martinez Variation
Levon Aronian (6)	Sergey Karjakin (7)	½–½	A29 English, Four Knights, Fianchetto Line
Veselin Topalov (4)	Hikaru Nakamura (5½)	0–1	D37 Queen's Gambit Declined
Viswanathan Anand (6½)	Anish Giri (6)	½–½	C50 Giuoco Piano
Round 14 – 28 March 2016
Peter Svidler (6½)	Viswanathan Anand (7)	½–½	A29 English, Four Knights, Fianchetto Line
Anish Giri (6½)	Veselin Topalov (4)	½–½	E06 Catalan Opening, Closed Variation
Hikaru Nakamura (6½)	Levon Aronian (6½)	½–½	D38 Queen's Gambit Declined, Razogin Variation, Alekhine Variation
Sergey Karjakin (7½)	Fabiano Caruana (7½)	1–0	B67 Sicilian Defence, Richter-Rauzer Attack, Neo-Modern Variation

=== Summary ===
Going into the final round, Caruana and Karjakin were tied for the lead, half a point ahead of Anand, and played each other in the final round. Due to the tie breaks situation, the only possible tournament winners were Caruana and Karjakin, with the winner of their final game also the winner of the tournament. A draw would cause the tournament result to depend on Anand's game against Svidler; if Anand won then Caruana would win, but otherwise Karjakin would win. Karjakin had the further advantage of white in the final game. Caruana played for a win in the final round, but overpressed, and at the critical moment, Karjakin calculated correctly and won the game and tournament. In retrospect, Karjakin's draw with black in his other game against Caruana, which Chessbase called a "brilliant defensive effort", was critical. Karjakin's victory qualified him as the official challenger.

== Championship match ==
The Championship match between Magnus Carlsen and Sergey Karjakin was held from 10 to 30 November 2016 in New York City, United States, under the auspices of FIDE.

=== Previous head-to-head record ===
Prior to the match, as of 10 November 2016, Carlsen and Karjakin had played each other 21 times (at long time controls) with Carlsen leading 4 wins to 1 with 16 draws. Their most recent encounter was at the July 2016 Bilbao Chess Masters double round-robin tournament, where Carlsen won one game while the other was drawn.

Head-to-head record
		Carlsen wins	Draw	Karjakin wins	Total
Classical	Carlsen (white) – Karjakin (black)	2	6	1	9
Classical	Karjakin (white) – Carlsen (black)	2	10	0	12
Classical	Total	4	16	1	21
Blitz / rapid / exhibition		14	5	7	26
Total		18	21	8	47

=== Lead up to match ===
After his victory in the Candidates Tournament 2016, Karjakin was scheduled to play in the Norway Chess event in April with a head-to-head game against Carlsen on tap, but cancelled his appearance, citing fatigue from the Candidates victory. He then surprised Carlsen by agreeing to play in the double round-robin Bilbao tournament in July. The games at the Bilbao tournament were played at a slightly faster initial rate (40 moves in 90 minutes) than that used in the World Chess Championship (40 moves in 100 minutes). Carlsen defeated Karjakin in their first game in the Bilbao tournament, while the second was drawn. He credited the faster time control in making it difficult for Karjakin to deal with pressure.

=== Organization and location ===
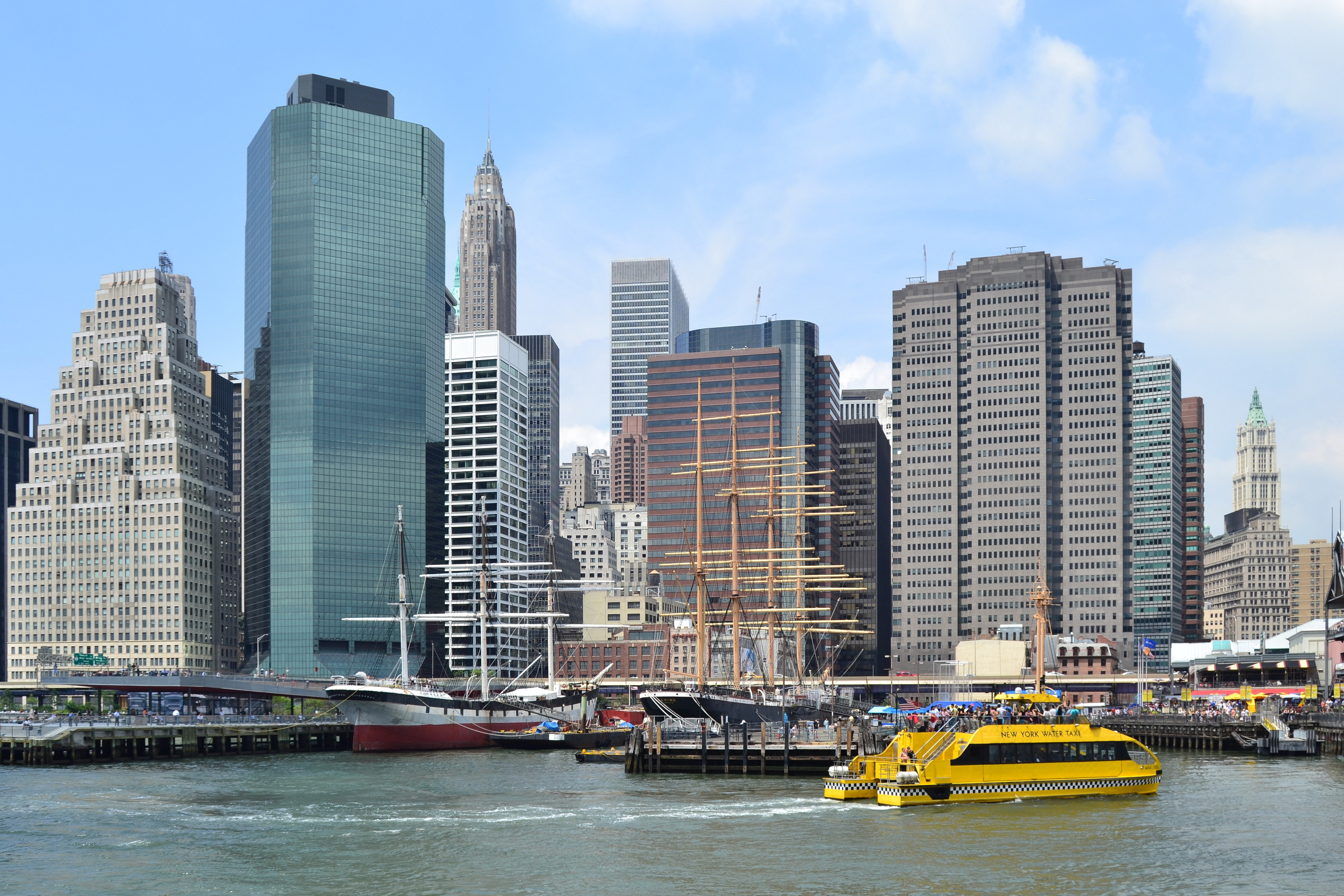
View of the South Street Seaport, the location of the 2016 World Championship

The match was held under the auspices of FIDE, the world chess federation, with the organisation rights belonging to Agon, its commercial partner. It took place between 11 and 30 November in the renovated Fulton Market Building (formerly Fulton Fish Market) in the South Street Seaport in New York City, with the two contestants competing for a prize fund of at least 1 million euros (US$1.1m). The chief arbiter was Takis Nikolopoulos from Greece.

=== Match regulations ===
According to the match regulations put forward by FIDE, the players could not draw a game by agreement before Black's 30th move, but they could claim a draw by threefold repetition. The time control was set at:

- for full-time control games, 100 minutes for the first 40 moves, 50 minutes for the next 20 moves and then 15 minutes for the rest of the game plus an additional 30 seconds per move starting from move 1.
- for rapid games, 25 minutes with 10 seconds increment per move (3.7.1a). The player with the best score after four games is world champion; if tied, players will play up to five two-game blitz matches.
- for blitz games (except the final sudden death game), 5 minutes with 3 seconds increment per move (3.7.2). The player with the best score after any two-game blitz match is world champion; if tied, players will play one sudden death game.
- for the final sudden death game, 5 minutes for white pieces, 4 minutes for black pieces, no increment for the first 60 moves, 3 seconds increment per move starting at the move 61 (3.7.3). The winner of this game is world champion; if drawn, black is the winner and world champion.

=== Seconds ===
Magnus Carlsen's team for the match consisted of Peter Heine Nielsen (main coach), Jon Ludvig Hammer (regular sparring-partner), Espen Agdestein (manager). Additional support was from the analytic team which included Laurent Fressinet, Nils Grandelius, Jan Gustafsson, and Maxime Vachier-Lagrave. Samuel Shankland took part in some training camps, and Magnus also played training games against Richárd Rapport.

Sergey Karjakin's team for the match included Vladimir Potkin, Alexander Motylev, Yury Dokhoian, Shakhriyar Mamedyarov, and some undisclosed Russian grandmasters.

=== Opening press conference ===
The opening press conference was held on 10 November. FIDE President Kirsan Ilyumzhinov was unable to attend following sanctions from the US Government over his ties with the Syrian regime, but communicated by Skype instead with vice president Gelfer the official FIDE representative (rather than deputy president Makropoulos). Agon's CEO Ilya Merenzon attended, and the two major sponsors (EG Capital Advisors and PhosAgro) had representatives, with both players and the chief arbiter rounding out the principals.

=== Broadcast ===
The video feed on the official website was only available after paying a fee. Live commentary was provided by Agon and Chess24. Prior to the match AGON tried to deny other websites to show moves of the match. AGON went to court over this but lost their case.

=== Schedule and results ===
Date	Day	Event
10 November 2016	Thursday	Opening ceremony
11 November 2016	Friday	Game 1
12 November 2016	Saturday	Game 2
13 November 2016	Sunday	Rest day
14 November 2016	Monday	Game 3
15 November 2016	Tuesday	Game 4
16 November 2016	Wednesday	Rest day
17 November 2016	Thursday	Game 5
18 November 2016	Friday	Game 6
19 November 2016	Saturday	Rest day
20 November 2016	Sunday	Game 7

Date	Day	Event
21 November 2016	Monday	Game 8
22 November 2016	Tuesday	Rest day
23 November 2016	Wednesday	Game 9
24 November 2016	Thursday	Game 10
25 November 2016	Friday	Rest day
26 November 2016	Saturday	Game 11
27 November 2016	Sunday	Rest day
28 November 2016	Monday	Game 12
29 November 2016	Tuesday	Rest day
30 November 2016	Wednesday	Tie-break games
30 November 2016	Wednesday	Awards and closing

The games commenced each day at 14:00 local time in New York City.

World Chess Championship 2016
	Rating	Classical games												Points	Rapid games				Total
	Rating	1	2	3	4	5	6	7	8	9	10	11	12	Points	13	14	15	16	Total
Sergey Karjakin (RUS)	2772	½	½	½	½	½	½	½	1	½	0	½	½	6	½	½	0	0	7
Magnus Carlsen (NOR)	2853	½	½	½	½	½	½	½	0	½	1	½	½	6	½	½	1	1	9

=== Classical games ===
==== Game 1: Carlsen–Karjakin, ½–½ ====
Carlsen–Karjakin, game 1

Position: a8 black rook, g8 black king, a7 black pawn, b7 black pawn, e7 black bishop, f7 black pawn, h7 black pawn, e6 black pawn, f6 black pawn, c4 white rook, e3 white pawn, f3 white knight, a2 white pawn, b2 white pawn, f2 white pawn, g2 white pawn, h2 white pawn, g1 white king

Position after 19.Rxc4

Carlsen opened with 1.d4, and then chose to play the Trompowsky Attack (1.d4 Nf6 2.Bg5), an uncommon opening at the elite level, though one which Carlsen has employed before. A temporary pawn sacrifice by White led to mass exchanges and an endgame in which White had the better pawn structure and so slightly better chances. However Black's position was solid and Karjakin defended robustly. After 42 moves the game was drawn.

Carlsen's opening choice was recalled multiple times in interviews and the post-game press conference, in part due to its uncommon reputation, but also because its name resonated with Donald Trump and the recent United States presidential election three days prior. Carlsen said that if he had known how many questions he would face over his opening choice, he would have played something else. Karjakin noted the media appeared more surprised about Carlsen's opening choice than he himself was, and indicated that perhaps move 27 was Carlsen's last chance to make something of the game.

Trompowsky Attack (ECO A45)
1. d4 Nf6 2. Bg5 d5 3. e3 c5 4. Bxf6 gxf6 5. dxc5 Nc6 6. Bb5 e6 7. c4 dxc4 8. Nd2 Bxc5 9. Ngf3 0-0 10. 0-0 Na5 11. Rc1 Be7 12. Qc2 Bd7 13. Bxd7 Qxd7 14. Qc3 Qd5 15. Nxc4 Nxc4 16. Qxc4 Qxc4 17. Rxc4 Rfc8 18. Rfc1 Rxc4 19. Rxc4 (diagram) Rd8 20. g3 Rd7 21. Kf1 f5 22. Ke2 Bf6 23. b3 Kf8 24. h3 h6 25. Ne1 Ke7 26. Nd3 Kd8 27. f4 h5 28. a4 Rd5 29. Nc5 b6 30. Na6 Be7 31. Nb8 a5 32. Nc6+ Ke8 33. Ne5 Bc5 34. Rc3 Ke7 35. Rd3 Rxd3 36. Kxd3 f6 37. Nc6+ Kd6 38. Nd4 Kd5 39. Nb5 Kc6 40. Nd4+ Kd6 41. Nb5+ Kd7 42. Nd4 Kd6 ½–½

==== Game 2: Karjakin–Carlsen, ½–½ ====
Karjakin–Carlsen, game 2

Position: c8 black rook, d8 black queen, e8 black rook, f8 black bishop, g8 black king, c7 black pawn, f7 black pawn, g7 black pawn, a6 black pawn, b6 black knight, d6 black pawn, f6 black knight, h6 black pawn, b5 black pawn, e5 black pawn, d4 white pawn, e4 white pawn, a3 white pawn, b3 white pawn, c3 white knight, f3 white knight, h3 white pawn, b2 white bishop, c2 white pawn, f2 white pawn, g2 white pawn, a1 white rook, d1 white queen, e1 white rook, g1 white king

Position before 18.dxe5

In game 2, Karjakin opened with 1.e4, which he had played in 9 of 12 prior encounters with Carlsen. Carlsen responded to Karjakin's Ruy Lopez with a classical line rather than the Berlin Defense. Karjakin then avoided the principal variation with 6.d3. Karjakin exchanged central pawns on move 18 (see diagram), and Carlsen said afterwards that Black was too solid in the center for White to regroup his Nc3 to g3.

After the game, Carlsen said that in a long match not every game is going to involve fireworks. The game had higher attendance than the opener, with one reason being that many schools used their free tickets on the weekend.

Ruy Lopez, Closed Defence, Martinez Variation (ECO C84)
1. e4 e5 2. Nf3 Nc6 3. Bb5 a6 4. Ba4 Nf6 5. 0-0 Be7 6. d3 b5 7. Bb3 d6 8. a3 0-0 9. Nc3 Na5 10. Ba2 Be6 11. d4 Bxa2 12. Rxa2 Re8 13. Ra1 Nc4 14. Re1 Rc8 15. h3 h6 16. b3 Nb6 17. Bb2 Bf8 (diagram) 18. dxe5 dxe5 19. a4 c6 20. Qxd8 Rcxd8 21. axb5 axb5 22. Ne2 Bb4 23. Bc3 Bxc3 24. Nxc3 Nbd7 25. Ra6 Rc8 26. b4 Re6 27. Rb1 c5 28. Rxe6 fxe6 29. Nxb5 cxb4 30. Rxb4 Rxc2 31. Nd6 Rc1+ 32. Kh2 Rc2 33. Kg1 ½–½

==== Game 3: Carlsen–Karjakin, ½–½ ====
Carlsen–Karjakin, game 3

Position: e7 white rook, f6 black king, e5 white knight, f5 white pawn, h5 white king, b4 black pawn, h4 black pawn, b3 white pawn, h3 black rook

Position before 70.Nc6 (70.Re8 wins)

This game saw the Berlin Defense, which is quite often seen in the World Championship (4 times each in 2013 and 2014). Carlsen avoided the 'Berlin Endgame' by playing 5.Re1. A mainline was followed until Carlsen retreated his rook only to e2 on move 10, upon which Karjakin thought for nearly half an hour. Carlsen followed it up with 11.Re1, apparently losing a tempo but having provoked the move 10...b6. At the press conference afterwards he joked that 10.Re2 was a fingerfehler which he corrected on the next move. (In fact the idea had been tried the previous year by grandmaster Rustam Kasimdzhanov.) Karjakin accepted slightly weakened pawns, and in contrast to the previous games decided to aim for counterplay with 29...Ra8 then 30...Ra2 rather than sit passively. Carlsen soon won a pawn to emerge with the first real winning chances of the match. After many vicissitudes along the way, Carlsen missed the winning 70.Re8 (see diagram). After 70.Nc6, Black could reach a theoretical draw by 70...Rc3 (attacking the knight, which guards White's rook), though some difficult follow-up lines might be needed before a drawn pawnless endgame would definitively be reached. Karjakin instead immediately grabbed White's f-pawn (70...Kxf5), which would lose against perfect play, but Carlsen granted him another drawing chance two moves later with 72.Rb7. This time Karjakin found the necessary defense 72...Ra1. An ensuing liquidation saw Karjakin's passed h-pawn strong enough to compel Carlsen to acquiesce to a draw after almost seven hours of play.

The game was hailed as a miracle escape for Karjakin and a showcase of his defensive skills. At the postgame conference, Carlsen said that he never saw a clear win, that it was "a little bit disappointing" not to have converted, and responded "absolutely" when asked if he was afraid to find out from the computer how much he had missed.

Ruy Lopez, Berlin Defense (ECO C67)
1. e4 e5 2. Nf3 Nc6 3. Bb5 Nf6 4. 0-0 Nxe4 5. Re1 Nd6 6. Nxe5 Be7 7. Bf1 Nxe5 8. Rxe5 0-0 9. d4 Bf6 10. Re2 b6 11. Re1 Re8 12. Bf4 Rxe1 13. Qxe1 Qe7 14. Nc3 Bb7 15. Qxe7 Bxe7 16. a4 a6 17. g3 g5 18. Bxd6 Bxd6 19. Bg2 Bxg2 20. Kxg2 f5 21. Nd5 Kf7 22. Ne3 Kf6 23. Nc4 Bf8 24. Re1 Rd8 25. f4 gxf4 26. gxf4 b5 27. axb5 axb5 28. Ne3 c6 29. Kf3 Ra8 30. Rg1 Ra2 31. b3 c5 32. Rg8 Kf7 33. Rg2 cxd4 34. Nxf5 d3 35. cxd3 Ra1 36. Nd4 b4 37. Rg5 Rb1 38. Rf5+ Ke8 39. Rb5 Rf1+ 40. Ke4 Re1+ 41. Kf5 Rd1 42. Re5+ Kf7 43. Rd5 Rxd3 44. Rxd7+ Ke8 45. Rd5 Rh3 46. Re5+ Kf7 47. Re2 Bg7 48. Nc6 Rh5+ 49. Kg4 Rc5 50. Nd8+ Kg6 51. Ne6 h5+ 52. Kf3 Rc3+ 53. Ke4 Bf6 54. Re3 h4 55. h3 Rc1 56. Nf8+ Kf7 57. Nd7 Ke6 58. Nb6 Rd1 59. f5+ Kf7 60. Nc4 Rd4+ 61. Kf3 Bg5 62. Re4 Rd3+ 63. Kg4 Rg3+ 64. Kh5 Be7 65. Ne5+ Kf6 66. Ng4+ Kf7 67. Re6 Rxh3 68. Ne5+ Kg7 69. Rxe7+ Kf6 (diagram) 70. Nc6 Kxf5 71. Na5 Rh1 72. Rb7 Ra1 73. Rb5+ Kf4 74. Rxb4+ Kg3 75. Rg4+ Kf2 76. Nc4 h3 77. Rh4 Kg3 78. Rg4+ Kf2 ½–½

==== Game 4: Karjakin–Carlsen, ½–½ ====
Karjakin–Carlsen, game 4

Position: a8 black rook, e8 black rook, f8 black bishop, g8 black king, b7 black bishop, c7 black pawn, d7 black queen, f7 black pawn, g7 black pawn, a6 black pawn, f6 black knight, h6 black pawn, b5 black pawn, e5 black pawn, c4 black knight, e4 white pawn, a3 white pawn, c3 white pawn, f3 white queen, h3 white pawn, a2 white bishop, b2 white pawn, f2 white pawn, g2 white pawn, h2 white knight, a1 white rook, c1 white bishop, e1 white rook, f1 white knight, g1 white king

Position after 17...Nc4. Karjakin's 18.Bxh6 was the start of sharp complications.

Position: f7 black bishop, b6 black bishop, g6 black king, a5 black pawn, e5 white bishop, f5 black pawn, g5 black pawn, c4 black pawn, g4 white pawn, a3 white pawn, c3 white pawn, b2 white pawn, e2 white king, d1 white knight

Position after 45.Nd1. Carlsen played 45...f4?, allowing Karjakin to blockade the position and draw. 45...Be6 would have given a decisive advantage.

Both players repeated the classical Ruy Lopez opening from Game 2, but this time White went with the main line 6.Re1. After White avoided the Marshall Attack with 8.h3, the pace slowed at move 11, with Carlsen thinking for 4 minutes before Karjakin took 10 minutes on his 12th.

The game developed into a sharp middlegame when Karjakin played 18.Bxh6, but Carlsen navigated the complications better, gaining a small advantage. Karjakin eventually decided to trade queens and enter an inferior endgame. Carlsen was pressing along the way, but Karjakin defended stubbornly, and Carlsen's 45...f4? made the position easier to defend. The game was drawn after 94 moves.

Chessbase opined that, after four games, Karjakin still had to find a way to put Carlsen under pressure while Carlsen has to do the same to win his good positions.

Ruy Lopez, Closed, Anti-Marshall System 8.h3 (ECO C88)
1. e4 e5 2. Nf3 Nc6 3. Bb5 a6 4. Ba4 Nf6 5. 0-0 Be7 6. Re1 b5 7. Bb3 0-0 8. h3 Bb7 9. d3 d6 10. a3 Qd7 11. Nbd2 Rfe8 12. c3 Bf8 13. Nf1 h6 14. N3h2 d5 15. Qf3 Na5 16. Ba2 dxe4 17. dxe4 Nc4 (first diagram) 18. Bxh6 Qc6 19. Bxc4 bxc4 20. Be3 Nxe4 21. Ng3 Nd6 22. Rad1 Rab8 23. Bc1 f6 24. Qxc6 Bxc6 25. Ng4 Rb5 26. f3 f5 27. Nf2 Be7 28. f4 Bh4 29. fxe5 Bxg3 30. exd6 Rxe1+ 31. Rxe1 cxd6 32. Rd1 Kf7 33. Rd4 Re5 34. Kf1 Rd5 35. Rxd5 Bxd5 36. Bg5 Kg6 37. h4 Kh5 38. Nh3 Bf7 39. Be7 Bxh4 40. Bxd6 Bd8 41. Ke2 g5 42. Nf2 Kg6 43. g4 Bb6 44. Be5 a5 45. Nd1 (second diagram) f4 46. Bd4 Bc7 47. Nf2 Be6 48. Kf3 Bd5+ 49. Ke2 Bg2 50. Kd2 Kf7 51. Kc2 Bd5 52. Kd2 Bd8 53. Kc2 Ke6 54. Kd2 Kd7 55. Kc2 Kc6 56. Kd2 Kb5 57. Kc1 Ka4 58. Kc2 Bf7 59. Kc1 Bg6 60. Kd2 Kb3 61. Kc1 Bd3 62. Nh3 Ka2 63. Bc5 Be2 64. Nf2 Bf3 65. Kc2 Bc6 66. Bd4 Bd7 67. Bc5 Bc7 68. Bd4 Be6 69. Bc5 f3 70. Be3 Bd7 71. Kc1 Bc8 72. Kc2 Bd7 73. Kc1 Bf4 74. Bxf4 gxf4 75. Kc2 Be6 76. Kc1 Bc8 77. Kc2 Be6 78. Kc1 Kb3 79. Kb1 Ka4 80. Kc2 Kb5 81. Kd2 Kc6 82. Ke1 Kd5 83. Kf1 Ke5 84. Kg1 Kf6 85. Ne4+ Kg6 86. Kf2 Bxg4 87. Nd2 Be6 88. Kxf3 Kf5 89. a4 Bd5+ 90. Kf2 Kg4 91. Nf1 Kg5 92. Nd2 Kf5 93. Ke2 Kg4 94. Kf2 ½–½

==== Game 5: Carlsen–Karjakin, ½–½ ====
Carlsen–Karjakin, game 5

Position: c8 black king, g8 black rook, b7 black pawn, a6 black pawn, c6 black pawn, e6 black bishop, g6 black queen, a5 white pawn, c5 white pawn, d5 black pawn, e5 white pawn, g5 black pawn, h5 black pawn, g4 white pawn, e3 white bishop, f3 white pawn, h3 white pawn, d2 white queen, f2 white rook, g2 white king

Position after 41.Kg2

In this topsy-turvy game, Karjakin equalized easily out of the opening (a Giuoco Piano) and seized the initiative in a complicated middlegame. Carlsen managed to neutralize Karjakin's initiative to enter a major piece endgame with opposite-colored bishops which he can try endlessly to win without risking a loss – the exact kind of game which he is renowned for winning. However, he played aimlessly before the first time control. After the careless king move 41.Kg2? (blocking his major pieces from the soon-to-be-opened h-file) he suddenly came under pressure. Like Carlsen in games 3 and 4, Karjakin failed to make the most of these chances, and the game ended in a draw, albeit the first in the match in which Karjakin had serious winning chances.

Giuoco Pianissimo (ECO C50)
1. e4 e5 2. Nf3 Nc6 3. Bc4 Bc5 4. 0-0 Nf6 5. d3 0-0 6. a4 d6 7. c3 a6 8. b4 Ba7 9. Re1 Ne7 10. Nbd2 Ng6 11. d4 c6 12. h3 exd4 13. cxd4 Nxe4 14. Bxf7+ Rxf7 15. Nxe4 d5 16. Nc5 h6 17. Ra3 Bf5 18. Ne5 Nxe5 19. dxe5 Qh4 20. Rf3 Bxc5 21. bxc5 Re8 22. Rf4 Qe7 23. Qd4 Ref8 24. Rf3 Be4 25. Rxf7 Qxf7 26. f3 Bf5 27. Kh2 Be6 28. Re2 Qg6 29. Be3 Rf7 30. Rf2 Qb1 31. Rb2 Qf5 32. a5 Kf8 33. Qc3 Ke8 34. Rb4 g5 35. Rb2 Kd8 36. Rf2 Kc8 37. Qd4 Qg6 38. g4 h5 39. Qd2 Rg7 40. Kg3 Rg8 41. Kg2 (diagram) hxg4 42. hxg4 d4 43. Qxd4 Bd5 44. e6 Qxe6 45. Kg3 Qe7 46. Rh2 Qf7 47. f4 gxf4+ 48. Qxf4 Qe7 49. Rh5 Rf8 50. Rh7 Rxf4 51. Rxe7 Re4 ½–½

==== Game 6: Karjakin–Carlsen, ½–½ ====
Karjakin–Carlsen, game 6

Position: a8 black rook, d8 black queen, f8 black rook, g8 black king, b7 black bishop, e7 black bishop, g7 black pawn, h7 black pawn, a6 black pawn, b5 black pawn, c5 black pawn, f5 black pawn, b4 black knight, e4 white knight, f4 white bishop, b3 white pawn, d3 white pawn, f3 white knight, h3 white pawn, b2 white pawn, c2 white pawn, f2 white pawn, g2 white pawn, a1 white rook, d1 white queen, e1 white rook, g1 white king

Position after 16...f5. Carlsen's opening preparation went at least this far.

After three intense struggles, the sixth game was a quiet, relatively short draw. In a main line Ruy Lopez, Karjakin avoided the Marshall Attack (regarded as a drawish line at grandmaster level), playing instead 8.h3. Carlsen played the somewhat similar line 8...Bb7 9.d3 d5, sacrificing a pawn for positional compensation. Faced with Carlsen's opening preparation, Karjakin chose to return the pawn and after further simplifications the draw was agreed.

Ruy Lopez, Closed, Anti-Marshall System 8.h3 (ECO C88)
1. e4 e5 2. Nf3 Nc6 3. Bb5 a6 4. Ba4 Nf6 5. 0-0 Be7 6. Re1 b5 7. Bb3 0-0 8. h3 Bb7 9. d3 d5 10. exd5 Nxd5 11. Nxe5 Nd4 12. Nc3 Nb4 13. Bf4 Nxb3 14. axb3 c5 15. Ne4 f6 16. Nf3 f5 (diagram) 17. Neg5 Bxg5 18. Nxg5 h6 19. Ne6 Qd5 20. f3 Rfe8 21. Re5 Qd6 22. c3 Rxe6 23. Rxe6 Qxe6 24. cxb4 cxb4 25. Rc1 Rc8 26. Rxc8+ Qxc8 27. Qe1 Qd7 28. Kh2 a5 29. Qe3 Bd5 30. Qb6 Bxb3 31. Qxa5 Qxd3 32. Qxb4 Be6 ½–½

==== Game 7: Karjakin–Carlsen, ½–½ ====
Karjakin–Carlsen, game 7

Position: c8 black rook, d8 black queen, f8 black rook, g8 black king, b7 black bishop, e7 black bishop, f7 black pawn, g7 black pawn, h7 black pawn, a6 black pawn, e6 black pawn, b5 black pawn, b4 black knight, e4 white knight, a3 white bishop, b3 white pawn, e3 white pawn, f3 white bishop, a2 white pawn, f2 white pawn, g2 white pawn, h2 white pawn, a1 white rook, d1 white queen, f1 white rook, g1 white king

Position after 16...Rc8. Defending the b7-bishop (protecting it from potential discovered attacks by the f3-bishop) with 16...Rb8 17.Qe2 Qa5 18.Bb2 would have given Black a slight advantage.

After three unsuccessful attempts at gaining an advantage with 1.e4, Karjakin played 1.d4 for the first time in the match. Carlsen responded with the Slav Defense, which transposed into a tame variation of the Queen's Gambit Accepted. Karjakin made a slight inaccuracy with 11.Nd2, but Carlsen seemingly underestimated his position with 16...Rc8 and failed to capitalize. Several forced exchanges later, the game entered an opposite-color bishop endgame where White was a pawn up, but could make no progress.

Queen's Gambit Declined, Semi-Tarrasch Defense (ECO D40)
1. d4 d5 2. c4 c6 3. Nc3 Nf6 4. e3 a6 5. Bd3 dxc4 6. Bxc4 e6 7. Nf3 c5 8. 0-0 b5 9. Be2 Bb7 10. dxc5 Nc6 11. Nd2 Bxc5 12. Nde4 Nxe4 13. Nxe4 Be7 14. b3 Nb4 15. Bf3 0-0 16. Ba3 Rc8 (diagram) 17. Nf6+ Bxf6 18. Bxb7 Bxa1 19. Bxb4 Bf6 20. Bxf8 Qxd1 21. Rxd1 Rxf8 22. Bxa6 b4 23. Rc1 g6 24. Rc2 Ra8 25. Bd3 Rd8 26. Be2 Kf8 27. Kf1 Ra8 28. Bc4 Rc8 29. Ke2 Ke7 30. f4 h6 31. Kf3 Rc7 32. g4 g5 33. Ke4 Rc8 ½–½

==== Game 8: Carlsen–Karjakin, 0–1 ====
Carlsen–Karjakin, game 8

Position: c8 black rook, d8 black rook, g8 black king, b7 black bishop, e7 black queen, f7 black pawn, g7 black pawn, h7 black pawn, b6 black pawn, e6 black pawn, g6 black knight, a5 black pawn, b5 white knight, c5 black bishop, c4 white knight, g4 black knight, a3 white pawn, b3 white pawn, e3 white pawn, b2 white bishop, f2 white pawn, g2 white pawn, h2 white pawn, c1 white rook, d1 white rook, e1 white queen, f1 white bishop, g1 white king

Position after 19.Nb5. White invites Black to attack his king with 19...Qg5, but Karjakin declines.

Position: e7 black queen, g7 black king, b6 white queen, h6 black pawn, e4 white pawn, a3 black pawn, d3 black knight, g3 white pawn, h3 white pawn, g2 white bishop, h2 white king

Position after 48...Nd3. According to Fabiano Caruana, Carlsen had a relatively easy draw by 49.e5, sacrificing a pawn to free his bishop. Instead after 49.Qa5? Qc5 50.Qa6 Ne5 Caruana assessed his position as "horribly difficult", and after 51.Qe6? h5! Karjakin was winning.

Carlsen played the Colle System, an innocuous opening rarely seen at grandmaster level. He then played recklessly for a win, openly inviting complications. Although analysis suggested that the complicated 19...Qg5 would have been good for Black, Karjakin refused to oblige, playing instead 19...Bc6. The position was equal, but Carlsen continued to play for a win. The move 24.bxc4 was criticized by commentators who said that if Carlsen wanted to make this recapture, it should have been done on move 22. Carlsen eventually overpressed with 35.c5?, going down two pawns for almost no compensation. In time trouble, Karjakin returned the blunder with 37...Qd3? (37...Qa4 was winning), allowing Carlsen to win back both pawns. The resulting position was objectively equal but double-edged in practice, with connected outside passed pawns but an exposed king for Karjakin. Once again Carlsen had forced drawing lines at his disposal, but chose to play for a win. Instead, he erred with 51.Qe6? and after 51...h5! 52.h4 a2! he resigned. (After 53.Qxa2 Ng4+ 54.Kh3 Qg1, White has to sacrifice the queen to avoid immediate mate.) International Master Sagar Shah attributed Carlsen's defeat to a loss of objectivity.

After the game Carlsen was visibly uncomfortable and left the press conference before it began, potentially incurring a fine of 5% of his prize money to the organizers Agon, and a further 5% to FIDE. FIDE released a statement the following day indicating that the penalty would be imposed. The fine was reduced on appeal to 5% of the prize money (2.5% to Agon and 2.5% to FIDE).

Colle System (ECO D05)
1. d4 Nf6 2. Nf3 d5 3. e3 e6 4. Bd3 c5 5. b3 Be7 6. 0-0 0-0 7. Bb2 b6 8. dxc5 Bxc5 9. Nbd2 Bb7 10. Qe2 Nbd7 11. c4 dxc4 12. Nxc4 Qe7 13. a3 a5 14. Nd4 Rfd8 15. Rfd1 Rac8 16. Rac1 Nf8 17. Qe1 Ng6 18. Bf1 Ng4 19. Nb5 (first diagram) Bc6 20. a4 Bd5 21. Bd4 Bxc4 22. Rxc4 Bxd4 23. Rdxd4 Rxc4 24. bxc4 Nf6 25. Qd2 Rb8 26. g3 Ne5 27. Bg2 h6 28. f4 Ned7 29. Na7 Qa3 30. Nc6 Rf8 31. h3 Nc5 32. Kh2 Nxa4 33. Rd8 g6 34. Qd4 Kg7 35. c5 Rxd8 36. Nxd8 Nxc5 37. Qd6 Qd3 38. Nxe6+ fxe6 39. Qe7+ Kg8 40. Qxf6 a4 41. e4 Qd7 42. Qxg6+ Qg7 43. Qe8+ Qf8 44. Qc6 Qd8 45. f5 a3 46. fxe6 Kg7 47. e7 Qxe7 48. Qxb6 Nd3 (second diagram) 49. Qa5 Qc5 50. Qa6 Ne5 51. Qe6 h5 52. h4 a2 0–1

==== Game 9: Karjakin–Carlsen, ½–½ ====
Karjakin–Carlsen, game 9

Position: g8 black king, c7 black bishop, d7 black queen, e7 black knight, f7 black pawn, h7 black pawn, g6 black pawn, c4 white bishop, d4 white pawn, h4 white rook, d3 white queen, f3 white pawn, d2 white bishop, f2 white pawn, g2 white king, h2 white pawn, a1 black rook

Position after 38...Ne7. Karjakin played 39.Bxf7+, but 39.Qb3 Nf5 40.Bxf7+ Kg7 41.Rh3 Qxf7 is a complicated variation which may have offered him more winning chances.

Carlsen opened with the Modern Archangelsk variation of the Spanish Game, a variation he had played only four times in his career. The game followed a line which Karjakin had used to beat Adams until move 18 at which point Carlsen deviated by playing 18...c5. Carlsen remained within his opening preparation until at least move 22, taking less than a minute to play the novelty 21...cxb3. The game developed into a pawn-up middlegame for White that offered White a long-term advantage, but Karjakin declined to sit on his 1-point lead and instead went for the win. The game became very tense with Carlsen consuming a lot of time. He played 38...Ne7 with less than two minutes on his clock, against Karjakin's 25 minutes. Karjakin invested most of the 25 minutes before making the bishop sacrifice 39.Bxf7+, when 39.Qb3 was also very strong and possibly even winning. In spite of his time situation, Carlsen defended accurately. In the resulting endgame White was still a pawn up, but the extra pawn was doubled. Karjakin kept playing, but could make no progress, and the game was drawn after 74 moves.

Ruy Lopez, Modern Arkhangelsk Defense (ECO C78)
1. e4 e5 2. Nf3 Nc6 3. Bb5 a6 4. Ba4 Nf6 5. 0-0 b5 6. Bb3 Bc5 7. a4 Rb8 8. c3 d6 9. d4 Bb6 10. axb5 axb5 11. Na3 0-0 12. Nxb5 Bg4 13. Bc2 exd4 14. Nbxd4 Nxd4 15. cxd4 Bxf3 16. gxf3 Nh5 17. Kh1 Qf6 18. Be3 c5 19. e5 Qe6 20. exd6 c4 21. b3 cxb3 22. Bxb3 Qxd6 23. Ra6 Rfd8 24. Rg1 Qd7 25. Rg4 Nf6 26. Rh4 Qb5 27. Ra1 g6 28. Rb1 Qd7 29. Qd3 Nd5 30. Rg1 Bc7 31. Bg5 Re8 32. Qc4 Rb5 33. Qc2 Ra8 34. Bc4 Rba5 35. Bd2 Ra4 36. Qd3 Ra1 37. Rxa1 Rxa1+ 38. Kg2 Ne7 (diagram) 39. Bxf7+ Kxf7 40. Qc4+ Kg7 41. d5 Nf5 42. Bc3+ Kf8 43. Bxa1 Nxh4+ 44. Qxh4 Qxd5 45. Qf6+ Qf7 46. Qd4 Ke8 47. Qe4+ Qe7 48. Qd5 Bd8 49. Kf1 Qf7 50. Qe4+ Qe7 51. Be5 Qe6 52. Kg2 Be7 53. Qa8+ Kf7 54. Qh8 h5 55. Qg7+ Ke8 56. Bf4 Qf7 57. Qh8+ Qf8 58. Qd4 Qf5 59. Qc4 Kd7 60. Bd2 Qe6 61. Qa4+ Qc6 62. Qa7+ Qc7 63. Qa2 Qd6 64. Be3 Qe6 65. Qa7+ Ke8 66. Bc5 Bd8 67. h3 Qd5 68. Be3 Be7 69. Qb8+ Kf7 70. Qh8 Qe6 71. Bf4 Qf6 72. Qb8 Qe6 73. Qb7 Kg8 74. Qb5 Bf6 ½–½

==== Game 10: Carlsen–Karjakin, 1–0 ====
Carlsen–Karjakin, game 10

Position: a8 black rook, f8 black rook, g8 black king, b7 black pawn, g7 black pawn, c6 black pawn, d6 black pawn, e6 black pawn, f6 black queen, g6 black knight, h6 black pawn, a5 black pawn, e5 black pawn, a4 white pawn, e4 white pawn, c3 white pawn, d3 white pawn, e3 white knight, g3 white pawn, h3 black knight, b2 white pawn, d2 white knight, e2 white queen, f2 white pawn, h2 white pawn, a1 white rook, f1 white rook, h1 white king

Position after 20.Nd2. 20...Nxf2+ forces White to either accept a draw or a worse endgame: either 21.Kg2 Nh4+ 22.Kg1 (22.gxh4? Qg6+ 23.Ng4 Nxg4 with an extra pawn and an ongoing attack) Nh3+ 23.Kh1 Nf2+ with a repetition, or 21.Kg1 Nh3+ 22.Kg2 Ngf4+ 23.gxf4 Nxf4+ 24.Rxf4 exf4 with possibly a slight advantage for Black.

Position: h8 black rook, a7 black king, b7 black pawn, e7 black rook, c6 black pawn, e6 black pawn, g6 black pawn, a5 white pawn, c5 white knight, d5 black pawn, e5 white pawn, f5 black knight, h5 black pawn, b4 white pawn, h4 white pawn, d3 white rook, f3 white pawn, g3 white pawn, h3 white king, b1 white rook

Position after 56.Rb1. 56...Rhh7? left the h7-rook temporarily unable to defend the e6-pawn, enabling the breakthrough 57.b5.

Game 10 was a Ruy Lopez anti-Berlin. In keeping with his game plan, Karjakin tried to remain as solid as possible. A critical moment arose after Carlsen's 20.Nd2, which allowed Black a forcing line (see diagram). Karjakin said in the press conference that he thought Carlsen could meet 20...Nxf2+ with 21.Kg1, and missed 21...Nh3+ 22.Kg2 Ngf4+ 23.gxf4 Nxf4+ 24.Rxf4 Qxf4 "and Black can never lose" (Carlsen); however Wesley So thought White still had an edge after either 24...Qxf4 or 24...exf4.

Reminiscent of games 3 and 4, the game evolved into one in which Carlsen could constantly press, while Karjakin defended. Carlsen steadily improved the position of his pieces, but had no breakthrough until Karjakin played the inaccurate 56...Rhh7?, which allowed Carlsen to play the break 57.b5! at a favourable time. Karjakin tried to seek active counterplay, but Carlsen fended him off and simplified into a winning endgame, earning Karjakin's resignation.

Ruy Lopez, Anti-Berlin (ECO C65)
1. e4 e5 2. Nf3 Nc6 3. Bb5 Nf6 4. d3 Bc5 5. c3 0-0 6. Bg5 h6 7. Bh4 Be7 8. 0-0 d6 9. Nbd2 Nh5 10. Bxe7 Qxe7 11. Nc4 Nf4 12. Ne3 Qf6 13. g3 Nh3+ 14. Kh1 Ne7 15. Bc4 c6 16. Bb3 Ng6 17. Qe2 a5 18. a4 Be6 19. Bxe6 fxe6 20. Nd2 (first diagram) d5 21. Qh5 Ng5 22. h4 Nf3 23. Nxf3 Qxf3+ 24. Qxf3 Rxf3 25. Kg2 Rf7 26. Rfe1 h5 27. Nf1 Kf8 28. Nd2 Ke7 29. Re2 Kd6 30. Nf3 Raf8 31. Ng5 Re7 32. Rae1 Rfe8 33. Nf3 Nh8 34. d4 exd4 35. Nxd4 g6 36. Re3 Nf7 37. e5+ Kd7 38. Rf3 Nh6 39. Rf6 Rg7 40. b4 axb4 41. cxb4 Ng8 42. Rf3 Nh6 43. a5 Nf5 44. Nb3 Kc7 45. Nc5 Kb8 46. Rb1 Ka7 47. Rd3 Rc7 48. Ra3 Nd4 49. Rd1 Nf5 50. Kh3 Nh6 51. f3 Rf7 52. Rd4 Nf5 53. Rd2 Rh7 54. Rb3 Ree7 55. Rdd3 Rh8 56. Rb1 (second diagram) Rhh7 57. b5 cxb5 58. Rxb5 d4 59. Rb6 Rc7 60. Nxe6 Rc3 61. Nf4 Rhc7 62. Nd5 Rxd3 63. Nxc7 Kb8 64. Nb5 Kc8 65. Rxg6 Rxf3 66. Kg2 Rb3 67. Nd6+ Nxd6 68. Rxd6 Re3 69. e6 Kc7 70. Rxd4 Rxe6 71. Rd5 Rh6 72. Kf3 Kb8 73. Kf4 Ka7 74. Kg5 Rh8 75. Kf6 1–0

==== Game 11: Karjakin–Carlsen, ½–½ ====
Karjakin–Carlsen, game 11

Position: e8 black rook, f8 black rook, g8 black king, b7 black bishop, d7 black queen, g7 black pawn, h7 black pawn, a6 black pawn, d6 black pawn, e6 black pawn, f6 black bishop, b5 black pawn, f5 white pawn, d4 black pawn, e4 white pawn, g4 white queen, a3 white pawn, c3 black pawn, d3 white pawn, h3 white pawn, b2 white pawn, c2 white pawn, d2 white bishop, g2 white pawn, a1 white rook, f1 white rook, g1 white king

Position after 18...c3

In his last game with the white pieces at standard time controls, Karjakin opened with 1.e4, and the game developed into the seventh Ruy Lopez of the match. Carlsen chose a variation which has given White "free pressure" (Svidler) in the past, but Karjakin failed to make the most of his theoretical edge. Instead it was Carlsen who was playing for the win, with the pawn sacrifice 18...c3 19.bxc3 d5!? This led to a passed pawn for Black that advanced all the way to the 2nd rank, but with his own king exposed, Black could not make progress and fend off a threatened perpetual check at the same time, resulting in a draw.

Ruy Lopez, Closed Defence, Martinez Variation (ECO C84)
1. e4 e5 2. Nf3 Nc6 3. Bb5 a6 4. Ba4 Nf6 5. 0-0 Be7 6. d3 b5 7. Bb3 d6 8. a3 0-0 9. Nc3 Be6 10. Nd5 Nd4 11. Nxd4 exd4 12. Nxf6+ Bxf6 13. Bxe6 fxe6 14. f4 c5 15. Qg4 Qd7 16. f5 Rae8 17. Bd2 c4 18. h3 c3 (diagram) 19. bxc3 d5 20. Bg5 Bxg5 21. Qxg5 dxe4 22. fxe6 Rxf1+ 23. Rxf1 Qxe6 24. cxd4 e3 25. Re1 h6 26. Qh5 e2 27. Qf3 a5 28. c3 Qa2 29. Qc6 Re6 30. Qc8+ Kh7 31. c4 Qd2 32. Qxe6 Qxe1+ 33. Kh2 Qf2 34. Qe4+ ½–½

==== Game 12: Carlsen–Karjakin, ½–½ ====
Carlsen–Karjakin, game 12

Position: b7 black pawn, e7 black bishop, h7 black pawn, a6 black pawn, c6 black pawn, e6 black king, f6 black pawn, g6 black pawn, d5 black pawn, a4 white pawn, d4 white pawn, f4 white bishop, g4 white pawn, c3 white pawn, d3 white king, f3 white pawn, h3 white pawn, b2 white pawn

Final position

Game 12 ended in a very short draw, the shortest of the match under standard time controls. Carlsen signaled his willingness to accept a quick draw by playing one of the most solid variations against the Berlin Defense. Karjakin did not disagree, and after mass exchanges the game was drawn in 30 moves, the earliest allowed by the rules of the match, and after only 35 minutes of play (for comparison several of the earlier games in the match took over 6 hours to conclude). In the post-game interview, Carlsen seemed keen on enjoying Wednesday's challenge of quicker tie-breaking games.

Agon Director Ilya Merenzon said during the press conference that fans holding tickets for round 12 would get into the tiebreak for free.

This game holds the dubious distinction of being the fastest game to finish in World Championship history, quicker even than various forfeits that have occurred as they require 1 hour to elapse before the player forfeits.

Ruy Lopez, Berlin Defense (ECO C67)
1. e4 e5 2. Nf3 Nc6 3. Bb5 Nf6 4. 0-0 Nxe4 5. Re1 Nd6 6. Nxe5 Be7 7. Bf1 Nxe5 8. Rxe5 0-0 9. d4 Bf6 10. Re1 Re8 11. Bf4 Rxe1 12. Qxe1 Ne8 13. c3 d5 14. Bd3 g6 15. Na3 c6 16. Nc2 Ng7 17. Qd2 Bf5 18. Bxf5 Nxf5 19. Ne3 Nxe3 20. Qxe3 Qe7 21. Qxe7 Bxe7 22. Re1 Bf8 23. Kf1 f6 24. g4 Kf7 25. h3 Re8 26. Rxe8 Kxe8 27. Ke2 Kd7 28. Kd3 Ke6 29. a4 a6 30. f3 Be7 (diagram) ½–½

=== Tie-break games ===
==== Game 13: Karjakin–Carlsen, ½–½ ====
Karjakin–Carlsen, tie-break 1

Position: f7 black king, g7 black pawn, b6 black bishop, e6 black pawn, h6 black pawn, d5 black knight, e5 white bishop, f4 white pawn, g3 white knight, h3 white pawn, g2 white pawn, h2 white king

Final position

The first tie-break game was level throughout, with neither player gaining a significant advantage.

Ruy Lopez, Closed Defence, Martinez Variation (ECO C84)
1. e4 e5 2. Nf3 Nc6 3. Bb5 a6 4. Ba4 Nf6 5. 0-0 Be7 6. d3 b5 7. Bb3 d6 8. a3 0-0 9. Nc3 Nb8 10. Ne2 c5 11. Ng3 Nc6 12. c3 Rb8 13. h3 a5 14. a4 b4 15. Re1 Be6 16. Bc4 h6 17. Be3 Qc8 18. Qe2 Rd8 19. Bxe6 fxe6 20. d4 bxc3 21. bxc3 cxd4 22. cxd4 exd4 23. Nxd4 Nxd4 24. Bxd4 Rb4 25. Rec1 Qd7 26. Bc3 Rxa4 27. Bxa5 Rxa1 28. Rxa1 Ra8 29. Bc3 Rxa1+ 30. Bxa1 Qc6 31. Kh2 Kf7 32. Bb2 Qc5 33. f4 Bd8 34. e5 dxe5 35. Bxe5 Bb6 36. Qd1 Qd5 37. Qxd5 Nxd5 ½–½

==== Game 14: Carlsen–Karjakin, ½–½ ====
Carlsen–Karjakin, tie-break 2

Position: h8 black king, e7 white king, g7 black pawn, f5 white bishop, h5 white pawn, h4 white pawn

Position after 78...h5! 79.gxh5 f5 80.Bxf5 Rxe7+ 81.Kxe7, which forces a draw: there is no way to dislodge the black king from the corner (see wrong rook pawn).

This game started with the Italian Opening instead of the more common Ruy Lopez. After a series of exchanges at moves 35–37 Karjakin found himself with a rook and pawn against Carlsen's two bishops. While materially equal in value, the open nature of the position gave the bishops great scope, and Carlsen had all the winning chances. By move 40, Karjakin had just 59 seconds remaining, whereas Carlsen still had 4 minutes. Carlsen failed to find the winning approach to the end game, and in spite of his time situation, Karjakin managed to set up a wrong rook pawn position where his king could not be dislodged from h8/h7/g8. He then exchanged his rook for one of the bishops, ensuring the draw. Judit Polgár called Karjakin's defensive skills, finding the required moves with only seconds on the clock, "unbelievable".

Giuoco Pianissimo (ECO C50)
1. e4 e5 2. Nf3 Nc6 3. Bc4 Bc5 4. 0-0 Nf6 5. d3 0-0 6. a4 a6 7. c3 d6 8. Re1 Ba7 9. h3 Ne7 10. d4 Ng6 11. Nbd2 c6 12. Bf1 a5 13. dxe5 dxe5 14. Qc2 Be6 15. Nc4 Qc7 16. b4 axb4 17. cxb4 b5 18. Ne3 bxa4 19. Rxa4 Bxe3 20. Bxe3 Rxa4 21. Qxa4 Nxe4 22. Rc1 Bd5 23. b5 cxb5 24. Qxe4 Qxc1 25. Qxd5 Qc7 26. Qxb5 Rb8 27. Qd5 Rd8 28. Qb3 Rb8 29. Qa2 h6 30. Qd5 Qe7 31. Qe4 Qf6 32. g3 Rc8 33. Bd3 Qc6 34. Qf5 Re8 35. Be4 Qe6 36. Qh5 Ne7 37. Qxe5 Qxe5 38. Nxe5 Ng6 39. Bxg6 Rxe5 40. Bd3 f6 41. Kg2 Kh8 42. Kf3 Rd5 43. Bg6 Ra5 44. Ke4 Rb5 45. h4 Re5+ 46. Kd4 Ra5 47. Kc4 Re5 48. Bd4 Ra5 49. Bc5 Kg8 50. Kd5 Rb5 51. Kd6 Ra5 52. Be3 Re5 53. Bf4 Ra5 54. Bd3 Ra7 55. Ke6 Rb7 56. Kf5 Rd7 57. Bc2 Rb7 58. Kg6 Rb2 59. Bf5 Rxf2 60. Be6+ Kh8 61. Bd6 Re2 62. Bg4 Re8 63. Bf5 Kg8 64. Bc2 Re3 65. Bb1 Kh8 66. Kf7 Rb3 67. Be4 Re3 68. Bf5 Rc3 69. g4 Rc6 70. Bf8 Rc7+ 71. Kg6 Kg8 72. Bb4 Rb7 73. Bd6 Kh8 74. Bf8 Kg8 75. Ba3 Kh8 76. Be6 Rb6 77. Kf7 Rb7+ 78. Be7 h5 79. gxh5 f5 80. Bxf5 Rxe7+ 81. Kxe7 Kg8 82. Bd3 Kh8 83. Kf8 g5 84. hxg6 ½–½ (The final position is a draw by stalemate.)

==== Game 15: Karjakin–Carlsen, 0–1 ====
Karjakin–Carlsen, tie-break 3

Position: h8 black king, c7 black pawn, g7 black pawn, d6 black pawn, h6 black pawn, b5 white pawn, d5 white pawn, e4 white pawn, f4 black pawn, e3 black knight, f3 white pawn, h3 white pawn, a2 black rook, b2 black queen, g2 white pawn, h2 white king, c1 white rook, e1 white queen, f1 white bishop

Position after 37...Ra2. Karjakin (White) played 38.Rxc7?, allowing Carlsen to win with 38...Ra1.

Carlsen (Black) followed the same strategy he had used in the previous game: get ahead on the clock, then sacrifice a pawn (30...e4!) for active play. His pressure on Karjakin's position eventually bore fruit. On move 38, with less than 20 seconds left and in a slightly worse position, Karjakin blundered with 38.Rxc7?, allowing the winning 38...Ra1, which skewered the white queen and bishop.

This gave Carlsen a 2–1 lead with one rapid game to play.

Ruy Lopez, Closed Defence, Martinez Variation (ECO C84)
1. e4 e5 2. Nf3 Nc6 3. Bb5 a6 4. Ba4 Nf6 5. 0-0 Be7 6. d3 b5 7. Bb3 d6 8. a3 0-0 9. Nc3 Na5 10. Ba2 Be6 11. b4 Nc6 12. Nd5 Nd4 13. Ng5 Bxd5 14. exd5 Nd7 15. Ne4 f5 16. Nd2 f4 17. c3 Nf5 18. Ne4 Qe8 19. Bb3 Qg6 20. f3 Bh4 21. a4 Nf6 22. Qe2 a5 23. axb5 axb4 24. Bd2 bxc3 25. Bxc3 Ne3 26. Rfc1 Rxa1 27. Rxa1 Qe8 28. Bc4 Kh8 29. Nxf6 Bxf6 30. Ra3 e4 31. dxe4 Bxc3 32. Rxc3 Qe5 33. Rc1 Ra8 34. h3 h6 35. Kh2 Qd4 36. Qe1 Qb2 37. Bf1 Ra2 38. Rxc7? Ra1 0–1

==== Game 16: Carlsen–Karjakin 1–0 ====
Carlsen–Karjakin, tie-break 4

Position: c8 white rook, e7 black bishop, f7 black pawn, g7 black pawn, h7 black king, b6 black pawn, d6 black pawn, h6 white queen, f5 white rook, h5 white pawn, e4 white pawn, f3 white pawn, a2 black rook, f2 black queen, h2 white pawn, h1 white king

Position after 50.Qh6+!! It is mate next move (50...Kxh6 51.Rh8#; 50...gxh6 51.Rxf7#).

Karjakin, as Black, was forced to take risks, because he needed to win the game to avoid losing the match. He played the Sicilian Defence, the only appearance of that opening in the match. Carlsen played calmly with a weakness-free position while Karjakin desperately attempted to create chances. This did not work, and Carlsen soon gained an advantage. Karjakin might still have managed to hold a draw, but since he had to win he left himself open to a winning attack. Carlsen finished the game with the queen sacrifice 50.Qh6+!!, which leads to mate on the following move. Grandmaster Lubomir Kavalek described the move as "the most brilliant final move of any world chess championship in history."

Sicilian Defence, Prins Variation (ECO B54)
1. e4 c5 2. Nf3 d6 3. d4 cxd4 4. Nxd4 Nf6 5. f3 e5 6. Nb3 Be7 7. c4 a5 8. Be3 a4 9. Nc1 0-0 10. Nc3 Qa5 11. Qd2 Na6 12. Be2 Nc5 13. 0-0 Bd7 14. Rb1 Rfc8 15. b4 axb3 16. axb3 Qd8 17. Nd3 Ne6 18. Nb4 Bc6 19. Rfd1 h5 20. Bf1 h4 21. Qf2 Nd7 22. g3 Ra3 23. Bh3 Rca8 24. Nc2 R3a6 25. Nb4 Ra5 26. Nc2 b6 27. Rd2 Qc7 28. Rbd1 Bf8 29. gxh4 Nf4 30. Bxf4 exf4 31. Bxd7 Qxd7 32. Nb4 Ra3 33. Nxc6 Qxc6 34. Nb5 Rxb3 35. Nd4 Qxc4 36. Nxb3 Qxb3 37. Qe2 Be7 38. Kg2 Qe6 39. h5 Ra3 40. Rd3 Ra2 41. R3d2 Ra3 42. Rd3 Ra7 43. Rd5 Rc7 44. Qd2 Qf6 45. Rf5 Qh4 46. Rc1 Ra7 47. Qxf4 Ra2+ 48. Kh1 Qf2 49. Rc8+ Kh7 50. Qh6+!! 1–0

== Aftermath ==
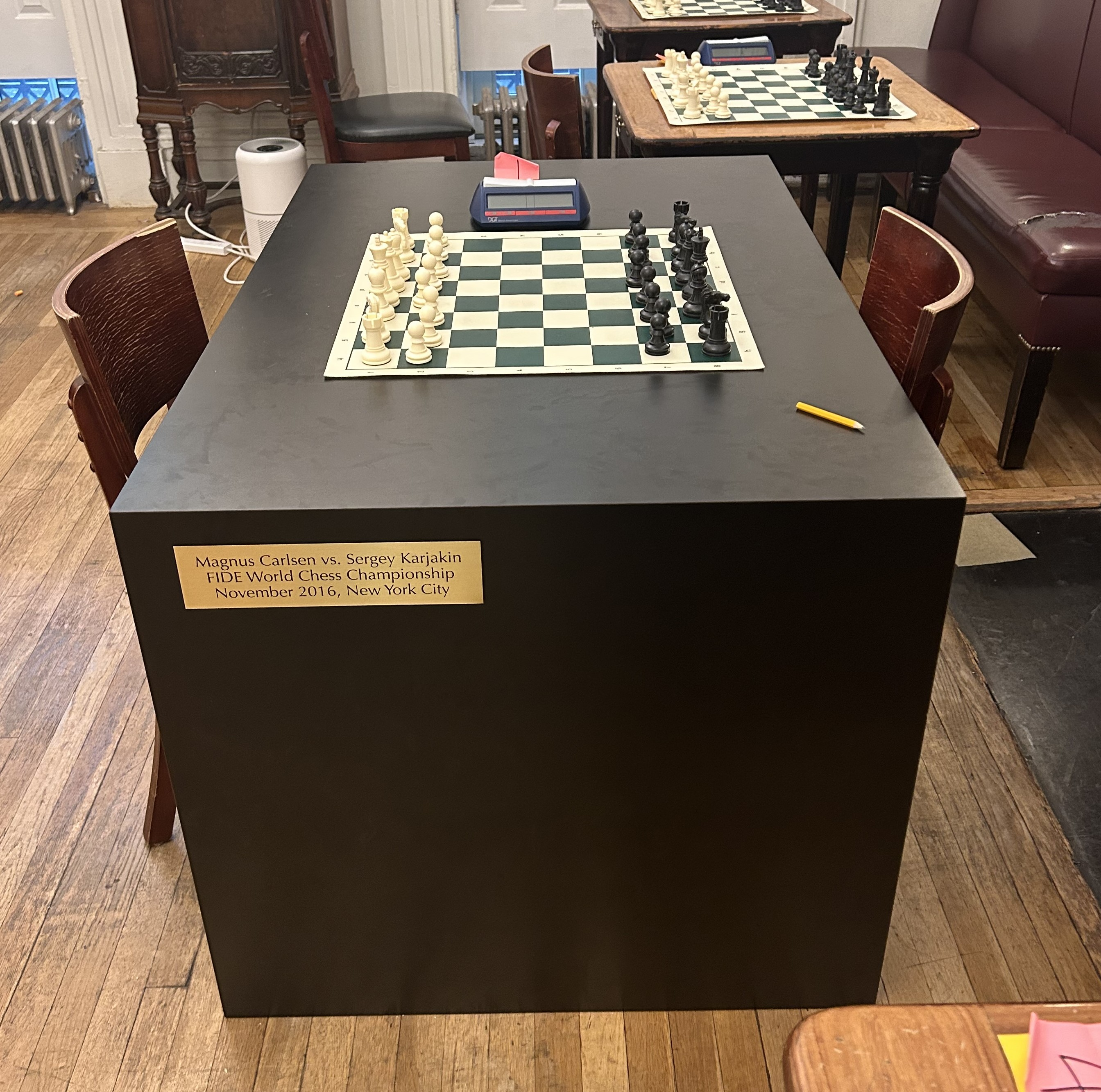
A photo taken in 2024 of the table used in World Chess Championship 2016. The table is now housed by the Marshall Chess Club in New York City. The table was donated by World Chess, the Championship organizer.

Annotating for Chessbase, David Navara wrote that Carlsen deserved the title, as he has been the number 1 player in the world for many years, but also that Karjakin deserved credit for successfully showing that it was possible to compete on even terms with Carlsen. Karjakin said in the postmatch conference that he had played well below his capabilities in the tiebreaks and was unable to make use of his preparation. Nonetheless, he indicated that he would accept his invitation to the next Candidates Tournament to fight for another match for the title. In the immediate future, however, he will concentrate on his personal life (his son having taken his first steps during the match), which he had neglected for the duration of the match.

The manner in which the match ended – the World Classical Chess Champion title being decided in a rapid playoff – earned some criticism from Yasser Seirawan and former world champion Anatoly Karpov as inappropriate, considering that there is also a World Rapid Chess Champion title. Speaking on the format during the postmatch conference, Carlsen reiterated his preference for a different format for the title (probably a knockout format he had proposed in 2015), while Karjakin indicated he was happy with the match format.

Because of the even score in the classical portion of the match, Carlsen lost 13 rating points in the December 2016 FIDE ratings list, while Karjakin gained 13 points. Carlsen remained the top player in the world, 17 points ahead of Fabiano Caruana, while Karjakin rose to sixth.

Carlsen and Karjakin played their next classical game at the 2017 Tata Steel tournament, and the game was drawn. The next decisive classical game was at Norway Chess 2017, with Carlsen winning.
