= World Chess Championship 2021 =

Chess match between Magnus Carlsen and Ian Nepomniachtchi

- Dubai Exhibition Centre, Dubai, United Arab Emirates
- 26 November – 10 December 2021
	Defending champion	Challenger
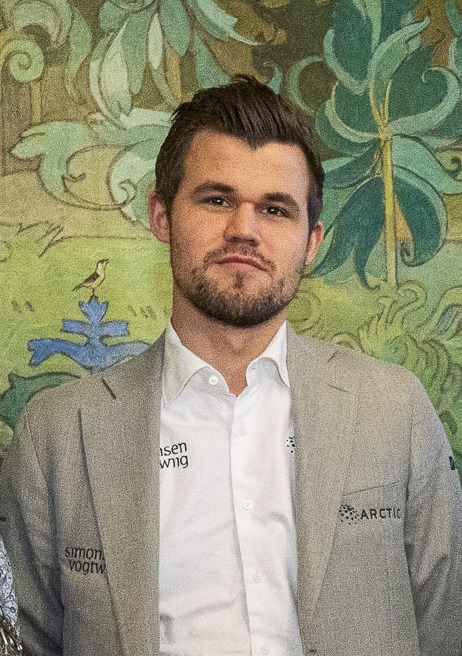
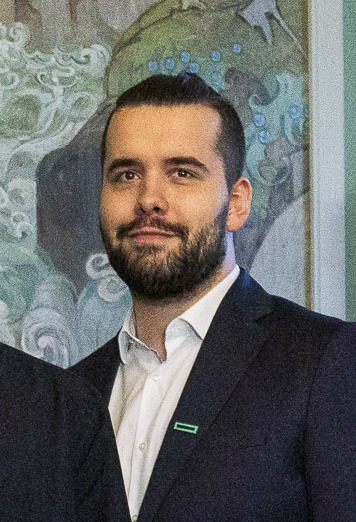
	Magnus Carlsen	Ian Nepomniachtchi
	(Norway) Magnus Carlsen	(Note: Nepomniachtchi is Russian, but competed under the Chess Federation of Russia flag, due to WADA sanctions against Russia. See the Sanctions against Russia section.) Ian Nepomniachtchi
7½	Scores	3½
	Born 30 November 1990; 30/31 years old	Born 14 July 1990; 31 years old
	Winner of the World Chess Championship 2018	Winner of the Candidates Tournament 2020–21
	Rating: 2856 (World No. 1)	Rating: 2782 (World No. 5)

The World Chess Championship 2021 was a chess match between the reigning world champion Magnus Carlsen and the challenger Ian Nepomniachtchi to determine the World Chess Champion. It was held under the auspices of FIDE and played during Expo 2020 at Dubai Exhibition Centre in Dubai, United Arab Emirates, between 24 November and 12 December 2021. It was originally scheduled for the latter half of 2020 but was postponed until 2021 because of the COVID-19 pandemic. As a result, this is the first sporting event to be held at an international exposition since the 1904 Summer Olympics during the Louisiana Purchase Exposition in St. Louis, United States.

The match began with five consecutive high-quality draws, before Carlsen won a closely-contested eight-hour struggle in Game 6 that, with 136 moves, was the longest ever game in a World Chess Championship. Following this loss, Nepomniachtchi's level of play worsened, with Carlsen capitalizing on a series of one-move blunders by Nepomniachtchi in Games 8, 9 and 11 to win another three points. This gave Carlsen a convincing match win with four wins, seven draws and no losses.

== Candidates Tournament ==
The challenger was Ian Nepomniachtchi, who qualified by winning the Candidates Tournament 2020–21, an eight-player double-round robin tournament in Yekaterinburg, Russia. Originally scheduled for 15 March to 5 April 2020, the tournament was halted at the halfway point on 26 March 2020 because of the COVID-19 pandemic. The second half was played between 19 April and 27 April 2021, also in Yekaterinburg.

The qualifiers for the Candidates Tournament were:

Qualification method	Player	Age	Rating	World ranking
Qualification method	Player	(March 2020)		
2018 World Championship runner-up	(United States) Fabiano Caruana	27	2842	2
The top two finishers at the Chess World Cup 2019	(Azerbaijan) ~~Teimour Radjabov~~ (winner). Withdrew.	33	2765	9
The top two finishers at the Chess World Cup 2019	(China) Ding Liren (runner-up)	27	2805	3
The top finisher in the FIDE Grand Swiss Tournament 2019	(China) Wang Hao (winner)	30	2762	12
The top two finishers in the FIDE Grand Prix 2019	(Russia) Alexander Grischuk (winner)	36	2777	4
The top two finishers in the FIDE Grand Prix 2019	(Russia) Ian Nepomniachtchi (runner-up)	29	2774	5
Highest average rating	(Netherlands) Anish Giri	25	2763	11
Highest average rating	(France) Maxime Vachier-Lagrave (replacement for Radjabov)	29	2767	8
Wild card chosen by organizer, subject to eligibility criteria	(Russia) Kirill Alekseenko (highest non-qualifier in Grand Swiss)	22	2698	39

If one or more players declined the invitation to play in the Candidates Tournament, the players with the next highest average ratings would qualify. On March 6, 2020, Teimour Radjabov withdrew because of concerns about the COVID-19 pandemic, and this rule was used to select Maxime Vachier-Lagrave as his replacement. Radjabov was given a direct entry into the next Candidates Tournament.

=== Results ===
Standings of the 2020–21 Candidates Tournament
Rank	Player	Score	H2H	Wins	SB	Qualification	NEP		MVL		GIR		CAR		DIN		GRI		ALE		WAN	
1	Ian Nepomniachtchi (RUS)	8.5	—	5	55	Advance to title match			½	0	½	1	½	½	1	0	½	½	1	½	1	1
2	Maxime Vachier-Lagrave (FRA)	8	—	4	53.75		1	½			½	½	½	0	1	½	½	0	1	½	1	½
3	Anish Giri (NED)	7.5	1.5	4	50.5		0	½	½	½			½	1	1	½	½	0	0	1	1	½
4	Fabiano Caruana (USA)	7.5	0.5	3	50.5		½	½	1	½	0	½			½	0	½	½	1	½	½	1
5	Ding Liren (CHN)	7	1.5	4	48.75		1	0	½	0	½	0	1	½			1	½	½	1	0	½
6	Alexander Grischuk (RUS)	7	0.5	2	50.5		½	½	1	½	1	½	½	½	½	0			½	0	½	½
7	Kirill Alekseenko (RUS)	5.5	—	2	38.5		½	0	½	0	0	1	½	0	0	½	1	½			½	½
8	Wang Hao (CHN)	5	—	1	34.5		0	0	½	0	½	0	0	½	½	1	½	½	½	½		

Source: Official website Chess.com
Rules for classification: 1) points; 2) head-to-head score among tied players; 3) total number of wins; 4) Sonneborn–Berger score (SB); 5) tie-break games.

Note: Numbers in the crosstable in a white background indicate the result playing the respective opponent with the white pieces (black pieces if on a black background).

== Championship match ==
=== Organization ===
The organization rights belong to World Chess, the commercial partner of FIDE.

The match was a best-of-14 match, with tie breaks if necessary. It was increased from best-of-12 (in place for every world championship match since 2006), after all 12 regular games were drawn in the previous match in 2018.

On 29 June 2020, the match was officially postponed to 2021 because of the COVID-19 pandemic.

The prize fund was €2 million, split 60% vs 40% between winner and loser. If the match had been tied after 14 classical games, the prize fund would have been split 55% vs 45% in favor of the tiebreak winner.

The chief arbiter was Mahdi Abdulrahim from United Arab Emirates, and the deputy arbiter was Andy Howie from Scotland.

The first move of each game was ceremonially performed by guests invited by the organisers:

Game	Guest	
1	Arkady Dvorkovich	FIDE President
2	Arkady Dvorkovich	FIDE President
3	Anastasia Myskina	Former tennis player and the 2004 French Open Women's singles winner
4	Saeed Hareb	General Secretary of the Dubai Sports Council
5	Sheikh Nahyan bin Mubarak Al Nahyan	Head of the United Arab Emirates' Ministry of Culture, Youth, and Social Development
6	Sergey Sobyanin	Mayor of Moscow
7	Andrey Guryev Jr.	CEO of PhosAgro
8	Míchel Salgado	Former Real Madrid football player
9	R Praggnanandhaa	The fifth-youngest chess grandmaster in history
10	Amna Al Qubaisi	The first Emirati female racing driver
11	Adi K. Mishra	Representative from Algorand Inc

=== Match regulations ===
The time control for each game was 120 minutes per side for the first 40 moves, 60 minutes for the next 20 moves, and 15 minutes for the rest of the game, with a 30-second increment per move starting with move 61.

The match was best of 14 games; a score of at least 7½ would win the world championship. If the score had been equal after 14 games, tie-break games with faster time controls would have been played:

- 4 rapid games with 25 minutes per side and a 10-second increment starting with move 1. If a player had scored 2½ points or more, he would win the championship.
- If the score were equal after the rapid portion, up to five mini-matches of two blitz games would have been played, each mini-match comprising two blitz games with a time control of 5 minutes per side and a 3-second increment starting with move 1. The first player to win such a mini-match would have been declared the champion.
- If all five blitz mini-matches were drawn, one sudden death (Armageddon) game would be played. In this format, black has 4 minutes and White has 5 minutes with a 2-second increment for both players starting with move 61; black wins the match if he wins or draws the game.

Players were not allowed to agree to a draw before Black's 40th move. A draw claim before then was permitted only through the arbiter, if a threefold repetition or stalemate had occurred.

=== Previous head-to-head record ===
Prior to the match, Nepomniachtchi and Carlsen had played 13 games against each other at classical time controls, of which Nepomniachtchi won 4 and Carlsen 1, with 8 draws. Several of these games were played when they were juniors, however, and in the five years before the match their head-to-head score was 1 win each with 4 draws. Their most recent pre-championship game, during the 2021 Norway Chess tournament, was a draw.

Head-to-head record
		Carlsen wins	Draw	Nepomniachtchi wins	Total
Classical	Carlsen (white) – Nepomniachtchi (black)	0	5	2	7
Classical	Nepomniachtchi (white) – Carlsen (black)	1	3	2	6
Classical	Total	1	8	4	13
Blitz / rapid / exhibition		22	32	10	64
Total		23	40	14	77

=== Location ===
Bids were originally to be presented to FIDE no later than 1 March 2019, with inspection of the proposed venues between 1 July and 15 August 2019.

Early interest was expressed in 2018 by Monaco and Vienna, though nothing came of these. Stavanger, Norway, announced a bid in March 2019, but withdrew it in June 2019 after Carlsen expressed reluctance to play the match in Norway. In November 2019, FIDE president Arkady Dvorkovich announced that FIDE had received bids from Dubai and Argentina. In February 2020, he announced the match would most likely take place in Dubai.

In January 2021, FIDE announced that the match would take place in Dubai from 24 November to 16 December 2021, as part of Expo 2020.

=== Sanctions against Russia ===
Due to WADA sanctions against Russia, FIDE confirmed that Nepomniachtchi would not compete under the Russian flag, but would play as a neutral player. The sanctions apply only to the world championship match, not to other FIDE events such as the Candidates Tournament. The Court of Arbitration for Sport upheld a ban on Russia competing at World Championships, and it is implemented by WADA in response to the state-sponsored doping program of Russian athletes.

Nepomniachtchi played under the Chess Federation of Russia (CFR) flag. Before the first game, WADA sanctions barred FIDE from using an initial flag with the full name "Chess Federation of Russia", so FIDE officials deployed a flag with the initials "CFR".

=== Seconds ===
Nepomniachtchi was helped by seconds Sergey Yanovsky, Vladimir Potkin, Peter Leko and Sergey Karjakin. Carlsen's seconds were revealed after the match as Peter Heine Nielsen, Laurent Fressinet, Jan Gustafsson, Jorden van Foreest, and Daniil Dubov. Carlsen confirmed that Nils Grandelius, who helped in previous World Championship preparation, was not on his team for this match.

Dubov was criticised by a number of other Russian players, including Sergey Karjakin and Sergei Shipov, who suggested that Dubov (a Russian grandmaster) should not aid a non-Russian in a match against a fellow Russian. In response, Dubov contended that he considered it to be a match between two individuals, and said that a counter-argument was that working with Carlsen would improve his chess and hence help the Russian team.

=== Schedule ===
In previous world championships, the players followed a simple two days on, one day off schedule. For this match, FIDE changed the format to a weekly cycle: 3 games Friday-Sunday, rest Monday, two games Tuesday-Wednesday, rest Thursday. Days with games are shaded. The tighter schedule was deliberately designed to try and ensure more decisive games.

Games started at 16:30 local time (GST), which is 12:30 UTC.

Colours were drawn at the opening ceremony, and Nepomniachtchi received the white pieces for the first game. Colours alternated thereafter, with no switching at the halfway point as in previous matches.

Date	Event
Wednesday, 24 November	Opening ceremony
Thursday, 25 November	Media day
Friday, 26 November	Game 1
Saturday, 27 November	Game 2
Sunday, 28 November	Game 3
Monday, 29 November	Rest day
Tuesday, 30 November	Game 4
Wednesday, 1 December	Game 5
Thursday, 2 December	Rest day
Friday, 3 December	Game 6
Saturday, 4 December	Game 7
Sunday, 5 December	Game 8
Monday, 6 December	Rest day
Tuesday, 7 December	Game 9
Wednesday, 8 December	Game 10
Thursday, 9 December	Rest day
Friday, 10 December	Game 11
Sunday, 12 December	Closing ceremony

The final three games were scheduled for 11, 12, and 14 December and tiebreaks were scheduled for 15 December; however, these were not required because Carlsen reached 7½ points after Game 11. Consequently, the closing ceremony, originally scheduled for either 15 or 16 December, depending on whether or not tiebreaks would be required, was moved up to 12 December.

=== Results ===
World Chess Championship 2021
	Rating	Match games														Points
	Rating	1	2	3	4	5	6	7	8	9	10	11	12	13	14	Points
Ian Nepomniachtchi (CFR)	2782	½	½	½	½	½	0	½	0	0	½	0	Not required			3½
Magnus Carlsen (NOR)	2856	½	½	½	½	½	1	½	1	1	½	1	Not required			7½

Note: Since Carlsen reached 7½ points with game 11, the match ended even though not all 14 games were played.

== Games ==
=== Game 1: Nepomniachtchi–Carlsen, ½–½ ===
Nepomniachtchi–Carlsen, game 1

Position: b7 black rook, h7 black pawn, a6 black pawn, c6 black rook, e6 black knight, f6 black king, g6 black pawn, c5 black pawn, f5 black pawn, h4 white pawn, c3 white pawn, d3 white pawn, e3 white knight, f3 white pawn, c2 white king, f2 white pawn, a1 white rook, e1 white rook

Position after 40.Ng2–e3. Here Carlsen (Black) played 40...Rd7 but he later remarked that 40...Nf4 was a better move, as the response he disliked 41.Ra4 can be met by 41...Rb2+! 42.Kxb2 Nxd3+ which would have been winning for Black.

Game 1 was a 45-move draw. Nepomniachtchi (White) opened with 1.e4, and the game developed into a Ruy Lopez. The players followed established lines until Carlsen (Black) played 8...Na5, the top choice of the neural network chess engine Leela Chess Zero. Nepomniachtchi quickly played the strong but not obvious move 14.Kf1!, indicating that he was still within his preparation. Carlsen sacrificed a pawn in return for the bishop pair, more space, and more activity. Nepomniachtchi played some inaccurate moves (22.Bf4?! and 30.Ne1?!), allowing Carlsen to gain a slightly better position. With Carlsen pressing, Nepomniachtchi defended accurately, returning the pawn to neutralize Black's initiative and reached a threefold repetition draw. In his commentary, GM Sam Shankland expressed concern about Carlsen's opening preparation, noting that he had failed to equalize in the opening.

Ruy Lopez, Closed, Anti-Marshall System 8.h3 (ECO C88)
1. e4 e5 2. Nf3 Nc6 3. Bb5 a6 4. Ba4 Nf6 5. 0-0 Be7 6. Re1 b5 7. Bb3 0-0 8. h3 Na5 9. Nxe5 Nxb3 10. axb3 Bb7 11. d3 d5 12. exd5 Qxd5 13. Qf3 Bd6 14. Kf1 Rfb8 15. Qxd5 Nxd5 16. Bd2 c5 17. Nf3 Rd8 18. Nc3 Nb4 19. Rec1 Rac8 20. Ne2 Nc6 21. Be3 Ne7 22. Bf4 Bxf3 23. gxf3 Bxf4 24. Nxf4 Rc6 25. Re1 Nf5 26. c3 Nh4 27. Re3 Kf8 28. Ng2 Nf5 29. Re5 g6 30. Ne1 Ng7 31. Re4 f5 32. Re3 Ne6 33. Ng2 b4 34. Ke2 Rb8 35. Kd2 bxc3+ 36. bxc3 Rxb3 37. Kc2 Rb7 38. h4 Kf7 39. Ree1 Kf6 40. Ne3 (diagram) Rd7 41. Nc4 Re7 42. Ne5 Rd6 43. Nc4 Rc6 44. Ne5 Rd6 45. Nc4 ½–½

=== Game 2: Carlsen–Nepomniachtchi, ½–½ ===
Carlsen–Nepomniachtchi, game 2

Position: a8 black rook, f8 black rook, g8 black king, a7 black pawn, b7 black bishop, d7 black queen, g7 black pawn, h7 black pawn, c6 black pawn, d6 white knight, e6 black pawn, b5 black pawn, e5 white pawn, a4 white pawn, c4 black pawn, b3 black knight, d3 black knight, g3 white pawn, b2 white pawn, e2 white queen, f2 white pawn, g2 white bishop, h2 white pawn, b1 white rook, c1 white bishop, f1 white rook, g1 white king

Position after 20.Rb1. Carlsen (White) previously offered a second pawn sacrifice with the move 19.Nd6, Hou Yifan felt that if calculated correctly, was acceptable in this position. Here, the continuation of 20.Rb1 was not favored by engine analysis; Sagar Shah noted that 20.Be3 was preferable as a dark-squared bishop would have been better in this position. Fabiano Caruana remarked that there were still chances for White, however.

Game 2 was a 58-move draw. Carlsen played the Catalan Opening, and Nepomniachtchi elected to hold the pawn with 7...b5 rather than return it with the usual 7...a6, giving Carlsen an advantage in development and central position. Although the variation was clearly in Carlsen's preparation, Nepomniachtchi did not shirk from a battle with 13...Nd3. The resulting middlegame was complicated, with Carlsen holding an advantage until the inaccurate 17.Ne5. Carlsen later confessed that he had missed his opponent's response 18...Nac5. Nepomniachtchi won the exchange, but White had strong compensation and initiative. The game continued to be complicated, with commentator Sam Shankland writing that he thought White had an advantage before consulting an engine, which clearly favoured Black. GM Anish Giri called Nepomniachtchi's 24...c3 a "panicky" move, and indeed this gave up most of his advantage. White had an opportunity to push for more, but an inaccuracy by Carlsen allowed Nepomniachtchi to force a theoretically drawn position. After a forced queen exchange, Carlsen played on for 15 moves, but the result was never in doubt.

Catalan, Open, Classical Line (ECO E05)
1. d4 Nf6 2. c4 e6 3. Nf3 d5 4. g3 Be7 5. Bg2 0-0 6. 0-0 dxc4 7. Qc2 b5 8. Ne5 c6 9. a4 Nd5 10. Nc3 f6 11. Nf3 Qd7 12. e4 Nb4 13. Qe2 Nd3 14. e5 Bb7 15. exf6 Bxf6 16. Ne4 Na6 17. Ne5 Bxe5 18. dxe5 Nac5 19. Nd6 Nb3 20. Rb1 (diagram) Nbxc1 21. Rbxc1 Nxc1 22. Rxc1 Rab8 23. Rd1 Ba8 24. Be4 c3 25. Qc2 g6 26. bxc3 bxa4 27. Qxa4 Rfd8 28. Ra1 c5 29. Qc4 Bxe4 30. Nxe4 Kh8 31. Nd6 Rb6 32. Qxc5 Rdb8 33. Kg2 a6 34. Kh3 Rc6 35. Qd4 Kg8 36. c4 Qc7 37. Qg4 Rxd6 38. exd6 Qxd6 39. c5 Qxc5 40. Qxe6+ Kg7 41. Rxa6 Rf8 42. f4 Qf5+ 43. Qxf5 Rxf5 44. Ra7+ Kg8 45. Kg4 Rb5 46. Re7 Ra5 47. Re5 Ra7 48. h4 Kg7 49. h5 Kh6 50. Kh4 Ra1 51. g4 Rh1+ 52. Kg3 gxh5 53. Re6+ Kg7 54. g5 Rg1+ 55. Kf2 Ra1 56. Rh6 Ra4 57. Kf3 Ra3+ 58. Kf2 Ra4 ½–½

=== Game 3: Nepomniachtchi–Carlsen, ½–½ ===
Nepomniachtchi–Carlsen, game 3

Position: a8 black rook, c8 black bishop, d8 black queen, e8 black rook, f8 black bishop, g8 black king, c7 black pawn, f7 black pawn, g7 black pawn, c6 black knight, d6 black pawn, f6 black knight, h6 black pawn, a5 black pawn, e5 black pawn, a4 white pawn, c4 white knight, e4 white pawn, b3 white bishop, c3 white bishop, d3 white pawn, f3 white knight, b2 white pawn, f2 white pawn, g2 white pawn, h2 white pawn, c1 white rook, d1 white queen, e1 white rook, g1 white king

Position after 17...Bc8

Game 3 was a 41-move draw. Like Game 1, the players played the Ruy Lopez. Nepomniachtchi deviated first with 8.a4, but Carlsen was prepared and equalized smoothly. White had a small initiative, but after an accurate bishop maneuver by Black (17...Bc8 followed by ...Be6 preparing ...d5), mass exchanges into a drawn endgame followed. Chess.com called Carlsen's preparation with Black thus far "bulletproof", although Carlsen remarked during the postgame conference that it had not been as easy as it looked, and he had not managed to get many chances.

Ruy Lopez, Closed, Anti-Marshall System 8.a4 (ECO C88)
1. e4 e5 2. Nf3 Nc6 3. Bb5 a6 4. Ba4 Nf6 5. 0-0 Be7 6. Re1 b5 7. Bb3 0-0 8. a4 Bb7 9. d3 d6 10. Nbd2 Re8 11. Nf1 h6 12. Bd2 Bf8 13. Ne3 Ne7 14. c4 bxc4 15. Nxc4 Nc6 16. Rc1 a5 17. Bc3 Bc8 (diagram) 18. d4 exd4 19. Nxd4 Nxd4 20. Qxd4 Be6 21. h3 c6 22. Bc2 d5 23. e5 dxc4 24. Qxd8 Rexd8 25. exf6 Bb4 26. fxg7 Bxc3 27. bxc3 Kxg7 28. Kf1 Rab8 29. Rb1 Kf6 30. Rxb8 Rxb8 31. Rb1 Rxb1+ 32. Bxb1 Ke5 33. Ke2 f5 34. Bc2 f4 35. Bb1 c5 36. Bc2 Bd7 37. f3 Kf6 38. h4 Ke5 39. Kf2 Kf6 40. Ke2 Ke5 41. Kf2 ½–½

=== Game 4: Carlsen–Nepomniachtchi, ½–½ ===
Carlsen–Nepomniachtchi, game 4

Position: a8 black rook, b8 black knight, f8 black rook, g8 black king, f7 black pawn, g7 black pawn, h7 black pawn, b6 black pawn, d6 black bishop, a5 black pawn, b5 white pawn, d5 black pawn, d4 white pawn, h4 white knight, c3 white pawn, f2 white pawn, g2 white pawn, h2 white pawn, a1 white rook, c1 white bishop, e1 white rook, g1 white king

Position after 18.Nh4

Game 4 was a 33-move draw. Carlsen opened with 1.e4, against which Nepomniachtchi played Petrov's Defence. The game followed known theory until Carlsen tried the novelty 18.Nh4. Although an interesting move, Nepomniachtchi had seen the idea before and had prepared for the variation. Although the position looked risky for Nepomniachtchi with a knight stuck on f8, the passed a-pawn provided strong counterplay. Carlsen thought for 50 minutes looking for winning chances, before acquiescing to a draw by threefold repetition.

Commentators GM Sam Shankland and GM Fabiano Caruana felt that Nepomniachtchi was the moral victor of the game, having successfully reached a clean draw even when faced with a new idea.

Petrov's Defence, Classical Variation (ECO C42)
1. e4 e5 2. Nf3 Nf6 3. Nxe5 d6 4. Nf3 Nxe4 5. d4 d5 6. Bd3 Bd6 7. 0-0 0-0 8. c4 c6 9. Re1 Bf5 10. Qb3 Qd7 11. Nc3 Nxc3 12. Bxf5 Qxf5 13. bxc3 b6 14. cxd5 cxd5 15. Qb5 Qd7 16. a4 Qxb5 17. axb5 a5 18. Nh4 (diagram) g6 19. g4 Nd7 20. Ng2 Rfc8 21. Bf4 Bxf4 22. Nxf4 Rxc3 23. Nxd5 Rd3 24. Re7 Nf8 25. Nf6+ Kg7 26. Ne8+ Kg8 27. d5 a4 28. Nf6+ Kg7 29. g5 a3 30. Ne8+ Kg8 31. Nf6+ Kg7 32. Ne8+ Kg8 33. Nf6+ ½–½

=== Game 5: Nepomniachtchi–Carlsen, ½–½ ===
Nepomniachtchi–Carlsen, game 5

Position: b8 black rook, c8 black bishop, e8 black queen, f8 black rook, g8 black king, c7 black pawn, f7 black pawn, g7 black pawn, d6 black bishop, f6 black knight, g6 black knight, h6 black pawn, e5 black pawn, e4 white pawn, b3 white bishop, c3 white pawn, e3 white bishop, f3 white knight, g3 white knight, h3 white pawn, c2 white queen, f2 white pawn, g2 white pawn, a1 white rook, e1 white rook, g1 white king

Position after 19...Qe8. Here Nepomniachtchi (White) would have maintained an advantage with 20.c4 rather than playing the passive move 20.Red1, creating space for White to play c5. In the case 20...c5 was played, the continuation 21.Ba4 Bd7? 22.Qd2 or 22.Nf5 would have put more pressure on Black's position.

Game 5 was a 43-move draw. Similar to games 1 and 3, Nepomniachtchi opened with e4 following the Ruy Lopez opening. The endgame resulted in a draw by threefold repetition.

Ruy Lopez, Closed, Anti-Marshall System 8.a4 (ECO C88)
1. e4 e5 2. Nf3 Nc6 3. Bb5 a6 4. Ba4 Nf6 5. 0-0 Be7 6. Re1 b5 7. Bb3 0-0 8. a4 Rb8 9. axb5 axb5 10. h3 d6 11. c3 b4 12. d3 bxc3 13. bxc3 d5 14. Nbd2 dxe4 15. dxe4 Bd6 16. Qc2 h6 17. Nf1 Ne7 18. Ng3 Ng6 19. Be3 Qe8 (diagram) 20. Red1 Be6 21. Ba4 Bd7 22. Nd2 Bxa4 23. Qxa4 Qxa4 24. Rxa4 Ra8 25. Rda1 Rxa4 26. Rxa4 Rb8 27. Ra6 Ne8 28. Kf1 Nf8 29. Nf5 Ne6 30. Nc4 Rd8 31. f3 f6 32. g4 Kf7 33. h4 Bf8 34. Ke2 Nd6 35. Ncxd6+ Bxd6 36. h5 Bf8 37. Ra5 Ke8 38. Rd5 Ra8 39. Rd1 Ra2+ 40. Rd2 Ra1 41. Rd1 Ra2+ 42. Rd2 Ra1 43. Rd1 ½–½

=== Game 6: Carlsen–Nepomniachtchi, 1–0 ===
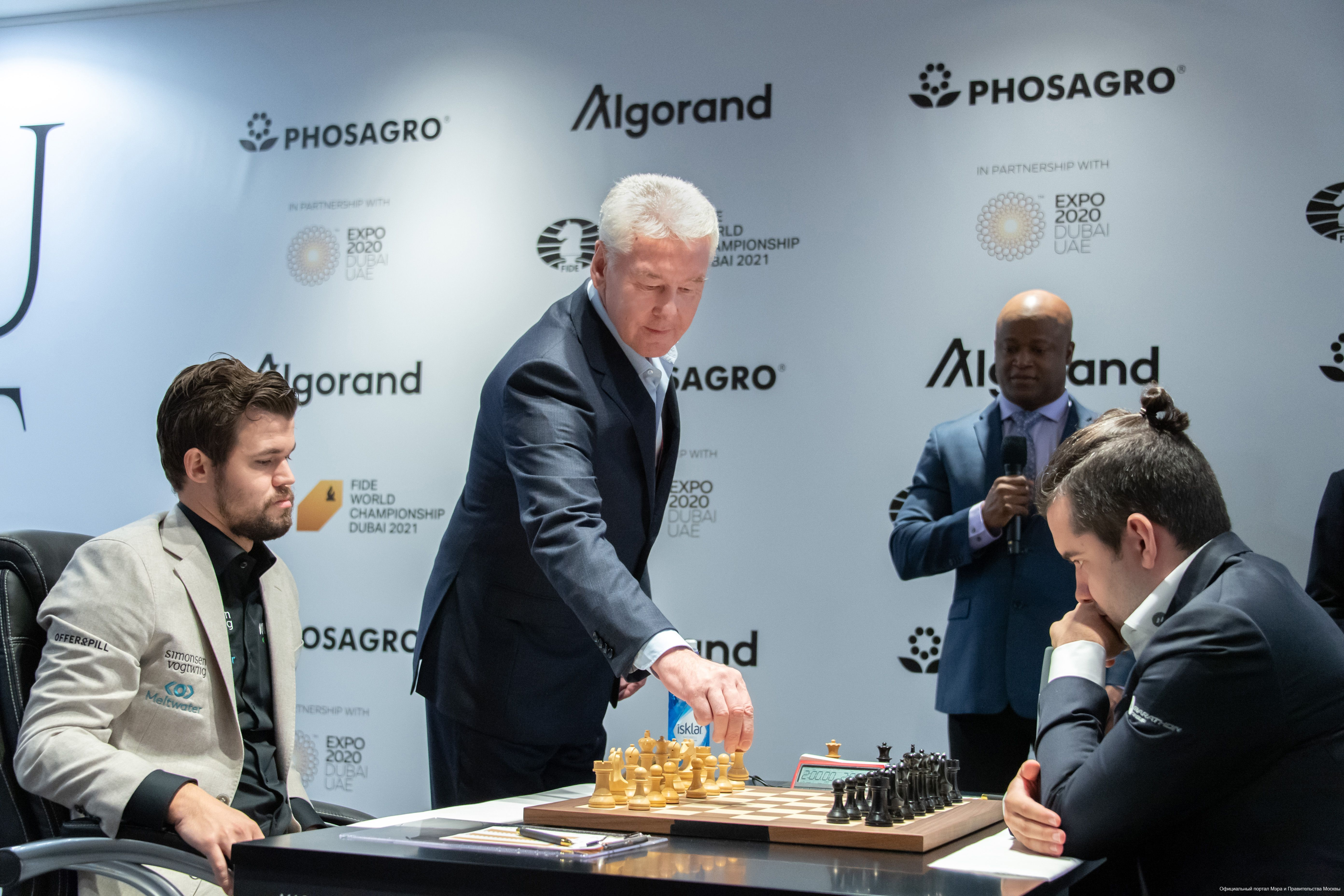
Beginning of game 6

Carlsen–Nepomniachtchi, game 6

Position: e8 black king, e5 white pawn, f5 white rook, f4 white pawn, g3 white knight, h3 white king, a2 black queen

The board after White's 130th move. According to seven-piece endgame tablebases, this was a drawn endgame until, in this position, Nepomniachtchi played 130...Qe6?, allowing Carlsen's decisive advance of all pieces.

Game 6 was a 136-move win for Carlsen that lasted 7 hours 45 minutes. As of 2026, it is the longest game in the history of the World Chess Championship, surpassing the previous record, a 124-move draw in game 5 of the World Chess Championship 1978 between Anatoly Karpov and Viktor Korchnoi.

With 25...Rac8, Nepomniachtchi unbalanced the position by giving up two rooks for Carlsen's queen, offering a slight material advantage to Carlsen in exchange for Nepomniachtchi later obtaining a passed a-pawn. Both Carlsen and Nepomniachtchi missed chances during a time scramble just before the first time control at move 40, where the position was considered equal. With 52...Qe4, which Anish Giri believed was a mistake and Nepomniachtchi called "unnecessary" in the post-game press conference, Nepomniachtchi gave up his passed a-pawn for Carlsen's h-pawn, leading to an endgame which was advantageous to Carlsen. With 80.Rxf7+! Carlsen entered an endgame with rook, knight and two connected passed pawns against Nepomniachtchi's queen, which Giri described as "terribly unpleasant" for Nepomniachtchi. While the position was a tablebase draw, the burden was mainly on Nepomniachtchi to defend accurately to achieve this. Meanwhile, Carlsen could continue pressing with no serious threat of losing. Nepomniachtchi's 118...Qa5 (instead of Qb6+, forcing the white king into the open) made his task much more difficult. Ultimately, Nepomniachtchi made the decisive error 130...Qe6 (130...Qb1 and 130...Qc2 were the only drawing moves according to the tablebase), allowing Carlsen to begin advancing his pawns towards inevitable promotion.

The players discussed the game immediately after its finish and seemingly agreed that the objective result should have been a draw. In the press conference after the game, Carlsen said: "Obviously I'm elated to get this result. It was never easy. Frankly it shouldn't be. There was a lot of the same emotions as the game that I won against Karjakin (in Game 10 of the 2016 World Championship), which was a marathon there as well. Obviously this is huge."

The game was widely praised within the global chess community. Former world champion Garry Kasparov praised the game as a counterexample to the stereotypes that "chess isn't a sport" or "that physical condition isn't important in chess", as well as that "classical chess is dead". Former world champion challenger Nigel Short described the game as "epic" and called Carlsen's effort in the game "stupendous". Later in the match, The New York Times called game 6 "the breakthrough that blew open the contest" and "an epic struggle that rewrote the chess record books."

Queen's Pawn Game, Symmetrical Variation, Pseudo-Catalan (ECO D02)
1. d4 Nf6 2. Nf3 d5 3. g3 e6 4. Bg2 Be7 5. 0-0 0-0 6. b3 c5 7. dxc5 Bxc5 8. c4 dxc4 9. Qc2 Qe7 10. Nbd2 Nc6 11. Nxc4 b5 12. Nce5 Nb4 13. Qb2 Bb7 14. a3 Nc6 15. Nd3 Bb6 16. Bg5 Rfd8 17. Bxf6 gxf6 18. Rac1 Nd4 19. Nxd4 Bxd4 20. Qa2 Bxg2 21. Kxg2 Qb7+ 22. Kg1 Qe4 23. Qc2 a5 24. Rfd1 Kg7 25. Rd2 Rac8 26. Qxc8 Rxc8 27. Rxc8 Qd5 28. b4 a4 29. e3 Be5 30. h4 h5 31. Kh2 Bb2 32. Rc5 Qd6 33. Rd1 Bxa3 34. Rxb5 Qd7 35. Rc5 e5 36. Rc2 Qd5 37. Rdd2 Qb3 38. Ra2 e4 39. Nc5 Qxb4 40. Nxe4 Qb3 41. Rac2 Bf8 42. Nc5 Qb5 43. Nd3 a3 44. Nf4 Qa5 45. Ra2 Bb4 46. Rd3 Kh6 47. Rd1 Qa4 48. Rda1 Bd6 49. Kg1 Qb3 50. Ne2 Qd3 51. Nd4 Kh7 52. Kh2 Qe4 53. Rxa3 Qxh4+ 54. Kg1 Qe4 55. Ra4 Be5 56. Ne2 Qc2 57. R1a2 Qb3 58. Kg2 Qd5+ 59. f3 Qd1 60. f4 Bc7 61. Kf2 Bb6 62. Ra1 Qb3 63. Re4 Kg7 64. Re8 f5 65. Raa8 Qb4 66. Rac8 Ba5 67. Rc1 Bb6 68. Re5 Qb3 69. Re8 Qd5 70. Rcc8 Qh1 71. Rc1 Qd5 72. Rb1 Ba7 73. Re7 Bc5 74. Re5 Qd3 75. Rb7 Qc2 76. Rb5 Ba7 77. Ra5 Bb6 78. Rab5 Ba7 79. Rxf5 Qd3 80. Rxf7+ Kxf7 81. Rb7+ Kg6 82. Rxa7 Qd5 83. Ra6+ Kh7 84. Ra1 Kg6 85. Nd4 Qb7 86. Ra2 Qh1 87. Ra6+ Kf7 88. Nf3 Qb1 89. Rd6 Kg7 90. Rd5 Qa2+ 91. Rd2 Qb1 92. Re2 Qb6 93. Rc2 Qb1 94. Nd4 Qh1 95. Rc7+ Kf6 96. Rc6+ Kf7 97. Nf3 Qb1 98. Ng5+ Kg7 99. Ne6+ Kf7 100. Nd4 Qh1 101. Rc7+ Kf6 102. Nf3 Qb1 103. Rd7 Qb2+ 104. Rd2 Qb1 105. Ng1 Qb4 106. Rd1 Qb3 107. Rd6+ Kg7 108. Rd4 Qb2+ 109. Ne2 Qb1 110. e4 Qh1 111. Rd7+ Kg8 112. Rd4 Qh2+ 113. Ke3 h4 114. gxh4 Qh3+ 115. Kd2 Qxh4 116. Rd3 Kf8 117. Rf3 Qd8+ 118. Ke3 Qa5 119. Kf2 Qa7+ 120. Re3 Qd7 121. Ng3 Qd2+ 122. Kf3 Qd1+ 123. Re2 Qb3+ 124. Kg2 Qb7 125. Rd2 Qb3 126. Rd5 Ke7 127. Re5+ Kf7 128. Rf5+ Ke8 129. e5 Qa2+ 130. Kh3 (diagram) Qe6 131. Kh4 Qh6+ 132. Nh5 Qh7 133. e6 Qg6 134. Rf7 Kd8 135. f5 Qg1 136. Ng7 1–0

=== Game 7: Nepomniachtchi–Carlsen, ½–½ ===
Position: b8 black rook, e8 black rook, f8 black bishop, g8 black king, f7 black pawn, g7 black pawn, d6 black pawn, f6 black queen, g6 black knight, h6 black pawn, b5 black pawn, c5 black pawn, d4 white pawn, e4 white pawn, b3 white queen, e3 white bishop, f3 white knight, h3 white pawn, b2 white pawn, f2 white pawn, g2 white pawn, a1 white rook, c1 white rook, g1 white king

Position after 20...c5, initiating exchanges that White has no good way to avoid.

Game 7 was a 41-move draw. Carlsen equalized smoothly out of another Ruy Lopez, after which the players heavily exchanged material leading to a drawn position. The position was completely lifeless by the 28th move, with the remainder of the game a formality to accede to the rules regarding draw offers. For many commentators, this lifeless draw was not surprising because of how draining game 6 had been (it had ended after midnight).

Ruy Lopez, Closed, Anti-Marshall System 8.a4 (ECO C88)
1. e4 e5 2. Nf3 Nc6 3. Bb5 a6 4. Ba4 Nf6 5. 0-0 Be7 6. Re1 b5 7. Bb3 0-0 8. a4 Rb8 9. axb5 axb5 10. h3 d6 11. d3 h6 12. Nc3 Re8 13. Nd5 Bf8 14. Nxf6+ Qxf6 15. c3 Ne7 16. Be3 Be6 17. d4 exd4 18. cxd4 Bxb3 19. Qxb3 Ng6 20. Rec1 c5 (diagram) 21. e5 Qf5 22. dxc5 dxc5 23. Bxc5 Bxc5 24. Rxc5 Nxe5 25. Nxe5 Rxe5 26. Rxe5 Qxe5 27. Qc3 Qxc3 28. bxc3 Rc8 29. Ra5 Rxc3 30. Rxb5 Rc1+ 31. Kh2 Rc3 32. h4 g6 33. g3 h5 34. Kg2 Kg7 35. Ra5 Kf6 36. Rb5 Kg7 37. Ra5 Kf6 38. Rb5 Kg7 39. Ra5 Kf6 40. Ra6+ Kg7 41. Ra7 ½–½

=== Game 8: Carlsen–Nepomniachtchi, 1–0 ===
Carlsen–Nepomniachtchi, game 8

Position: f8 black king, a7 black pawn, d7 black bishop, f7 black pawn, g7 black pawn, c6 black pawn, f6 black queen, h6 black rook, b5 black pawn, c4 white bishop, d4 white pawn, h4 black pawn, e3 white queen, h3 white pawn, a2 white pawn, b2 white pawn, f2 white pawn, g2 white pawn, e1 white rook, g1 white king

Position after Nepomniachtchi (Black) played 21...b5?? (21...Kg8 or 21...a6 would have been better). 22.Qa3+ now wins a pawn for White.

Game 8 was a 46-move win for Carlsen. Nepomniachtchi blundered a pawn in the middle game, leaving him with a lost position, and Carlsen carefully and accurately converted his advantage to a win in the queen-and-pawn endgame. This gave Carlsen a two-game lead, with commentators saying it was now difficult for Nepomniachtchi to win the match.

Carlsen began with 1.e4 and Nepomniachtchi again replied with the Petrov Defense, Carlsen varying from game 4 with the less common Steinitz Variation (3.d4). Carlsen's 7.Nd2 is an obscure sideline, but it was after 9.0-0, in a position apparently beyond his preparation, that Nepomniachtchi took his first think before playing the surprising novelty 9...h5!?. In response, Carlsen took an even longer think before playing 10.Qe1+?!, a safe move, rejecting sharper (and perhaps stronger) alternatives by offering to trade queens. Carlsen commented after the game that he felt too tired after game 6 to properly calculate the sharper alternatives, and, leading the match, was happy to offer the quick draw and reach the scheduled rest day. Nepomniachtchi replied with 10...Kf8, avoiding the queen trade and probable draw which would have resulted from 10...Qe7, a decision which was criticized by multiple GMs, including Giri and Anand. Nepomniachtchi commented after the game that he thought both moves were equally drawish.

Middlegame play continued relatively normally until Nepomniachtchi blundered with 21...b5??, losing the a7 pawn in a simple combination. Commentators also considered Black's subsequent defense imprecise; several GMs, including Giri, Anand, Caruana and Polgár suggested 23...Bxh3 as a possible improvement, while Stockfish rates 24...Rd6 a blunder. Nevertheless, even with best defense the position was likely already lost by this point.

The rooks and bishops were quickly exchanged, and further consolidation resulted in a queen-and-pawn endgame with Carlsen up two pawns. Such endgames are often difficult to win due to the threat of perpetual check. Nepomniachtchi made a last-ditch effort to create perpetual checks, but Carlsen calmly spent his available time to ensure this could not occur. Nepomniachtchi gave up a third pawn on move 44 and resigned on move 46.

Petrov's Defense, Modern Attack, Center Variation (ECO C43)
1. e4 e5 2. Nf3 Nf6 3. d4 Nxe4 4. Bd3 d5 5. Nxe5 Nd7 6. Nxd7 Bxd7 7. Nd2 Nxd2 8. Bxd2 Bd6 9. 0-0 h5 10. Qe1+ Kf8 11. Bb4 Qe7 12. Bxd6 Qxd6 13. Qd2 Re8 14. Rae1 Rh6 15. Qg5 c6 16. Rxe8+ Bxe8 17. Re1 Qf6 18. Qe3 Bd7 19. h3 h4 20. c4 dxc4 21. Bxc4 b5 (diagram) 22. Qa3+ Kg8 23. Qxa7 Qd8 24. Bb3 Rd6 25. Re4 Be6 26. Bxe6 Rxe6 27. Rxe6 fxe6 28. Qc5 Qa5 29. Qxc6 Qe1+ 30. Kh2 Qxf2 31. Qxe6+ Kh7 32. Qe4+ Kg8 33. b3 Qxa2 34. Qe8+ Kh7 35. Qxb5 Qf2 36. Qe5 Qb2 37. Qe4+ Kg8 38. Qd3 Qf2 39. Qc3 Qf4+ 40. Kg1 Kh7 41. Qd3+ g6 42. Qd1 Qe3+ 43. Kh1 g5 44. d5 g4 45. hxg4 h3 46. Qf3 1–0

=== Game 9: Nepomniachtchi–Carlsen, 0–1 ===
Nepomniachtchi–Carlsen, game 9

Position: d8 black rook, e8 black bishop, g8 black king, b7 white bishop, c7 black pawn, f7 black pawn, g7 black pawn, e6 black pawn, c5 white pawn, e5 white pawn, h5 black pawn, a4 black rook, g4 black knight, h4 white pawn, b3 white knight, g3 white pawn, a2 white pawn, f2 white pawn, a1 white rook, e1 white rook, g1 white king

Position after Nepomniachtchi (White) played 27.c5??, a blunder allowing Black to trap White's bishop with 27...c6. Instead 27.f3 would have given White a slight advantage.

Game 9 was a 39-move win for Carlsen. Nepomniachtchi played the English opening, a good psychological choice because there are few forcing lines for Black. He managed to get a complicated position out of the opening, which was also a success because such positions often provide greater opportunities for a win. On move 15, Nepomniachtchi missed the idea 15.b4, which temporarily sacrifices a pawn for open lines. Nepomniachtchi agreed that this idea was promising when it was pointed out to him during the press conference. As the game continued, Carlsen missed White's 24.Qe1 when playing 21...Qb4, which allowed White to win the b7-pawn, but Black had sufficient compensation. One move after capturing the b7-pawn, however, Nepomniachtchi blundered with 27.c5??, leaving the bishop trapped after 27...c6. Nepomniachtchi found the best practical try after the blunder, but, down a bishop, his position could not be salvaged. This win gave Carlsen a three-point lead over Nepomniachtchi, and commentators agreed this virtually assured Carlsen would win the match.

English Opening, Agincourt Defense (ECO A13)
1. c4 e6 2. g3 d5 3. Bg2 d4 4. Nf3 Nc6 5. 0-0 Bc5 6. d3 Nf6 7. Nbd2 a5 8. Nb3 Be7 9. e3 dxe3 10. Bxe3 Ng4 11. Bc5 0-0 12. d4 a4 13. Bxe7 Qxe7 14. Nc5 a3 15. bxa3 Rd8 16. Nb3 Nf6 17. Re1 Qxa3 18. Qe2 h6 19. h4 Bd7 20. Ne5 Be8 21. Qe3 Qb4 22. Reb1 Nxe5 23. dxe5 Ng4 24. Qe1 Qxe1+ 25. Rxe1 h5 26. Bxb7 Ra4 27. c5 (diagram) c6 28. f3 Nh6 29. Re4 Ra7 30. Rb4 Rb8 31. a4 Raxb7 32. Rb6 Rxb6 33. cxb6 Rxb6 34. Nc5 Nf5 35. a5 Rb8 36. a6 Nxg3 37. Na4 c5 38. a7 Rd8 39. Nxc5 Ra8 0–1

=== Game 10: Carlsen–Nepomniachtchi, ½–½ ===
Carlsen–Nepomniachtchi, game 10

Position: a7 black pawn, b7 black pawn, c6 black pawn, d6 black king, f6 black knight, d5 black pawn, e5 white knight, d4 white pawn, c3 white pawn, e3 white king, a2 white pawn, b2 white pawn

Final position after 41.Ke3

Game 10 was a 41-move draw. It was a quick, quiet game with the players eventually splitting the point. Nepomniachtchi surprised commentators by again meeting Carlsen's 1. e4 with the Petroff Defense, indicating that he was happy with a draw despite the match situation. The queens were quickly exchanged and a symmetrical position with no weaknesses on both sides appeared on the board, leading to a draw. Shankland described the game as a "snoozefest" and suggested that were draw offers permitted before move 40, the players might well have called the game off as early as move 11.

Petrov's Defence, Karklins–Martinovsky Variation (ECO C42)
1. e4 e5 2. Nf3 Nf6 3. Nxe5 d6 4. Nd3 Nxe4 5. Qe2 Qe7 6. Nf4 Nf6 7. d4 Nc6 8. c3 d5 9. Nd2 Nd8 10. Nf3 Qxe2+ 11. Bxe2 Bd6 12. 0-0 0-0 13. Bd3 Re8 14. Re1 Rxe1+ 15. Nxe1 Ne6 16. Nxe6 Bxe6 17. g3 g6 18. Ng2 Re8 19. f3 Nh5 20. Kf2 c6 21. g4 Ng7 22. Bf4 Bxf4 23. Nxf4 g5 24. Ne2 f5 25. h3 Kf7 26. Rh1 h6 27. f4 fxg4 28. hxg4 Bxg4 29. Rxh6 Bf5 30. Bxf5 Nxf5 31. Rh7+ Ng7 32. fxg5 Kg6 33. Rh3 Kxg5 34. Rg3+ Kf6 35. Rf3+ Ke7 36. Nf4 Kd6 37. Ng6 Re6 38. Ne5 Ne8 39. Rf7 Rf6+ 40. Rxf6+ Nxf6 41. Ke3 (diagram) ½–½

=== Game 11: Nepomniachtchi–Carlsen, 0–1 ===
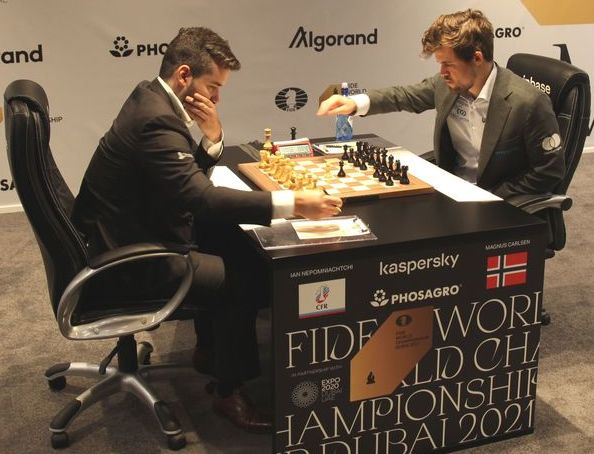
Beginning of game 11

Nepomniachtchi–Carlsen, game 11

Position: d8 black rook, g8 black king, c7 black pawn, d7 black queen, e7 black knight, f7 black pawn, g7 black pawn, b6 black pawn, h6 black pawn, a5 black pawn, d5 white pawn, a4 white pawn, d4 black pawn, f4 black rook, g4 white pawn, c3 white pawn, e3 white knight, b2 white pawn, c2 white queen, f2 white pawn, g2 white pawn, d1 white rook, e1 white rook, g1 white king

Position after 22...Rf4 by Carlsen. Nepomniachtchi tried 23.g3??, attempting to initiate an exchange. However, after 23...dxe3, the pawn on g4 is left undefended, allowing Carlsen's queen to capture it with a devastating attack on the white king.

Game 11 was a 49-move win for Carlsen. Nepomniachtchi began with 1.e4, as he had in games 1, 3, 5, and 7, but deviated with 3.Bc4, the Italian Game, instead of the Ruy Lopez he had played previously. He did not play the most ambitious moves, and Black achieved the central pawn break ...d5 – thematic in the Italian – before White did. With no advantage, Nepomniachtchi blundered again with 23.g3??, a surprising blunder because Black has only one good response, but that response wins. Carlsen did not play the most direct winning lines afterwards, but still simplified the position into a comfortable pawn-up rook endgame which he converted without trouble. Commentators suggested that 23.Rxd4 could have maintained a drawn position.

Italian Game, Giuoco Pianissimo (ECO C54)
1. e4 e5 2. Nf3 Nc6 3. Bc4 Nf6 4. d3 Bc5 5. c3 d6 6. 0-0 a5 7. Re1 Ba7 8. Na3 h6 9. Nc2 0-0 10. Be3 Bxe3 11. Nxe3 Re8 12. a4 Be6 13. Bxe6 Rxe6 14. Qb3 b6 15. Rad1 Ne7 16. h3 Qd7 17. Nh2 Rd8 18. Nhg4 Nxg4 19. hxg4 d5 20. d4 exd4 21. exd5 Re4 22. Qc2 Rf4 (diagram) 23. g3 dxe3 24. gxf4 Qxg4+ 25. Kf1 Qh3+ 26. Kg1 Nf5 27. d6 Nh4 28. fxe3 Qg3+ 29. Kf1 Nf3 30. Qf2 Qh3+ 31. Qg2 Qxg2+ 32. Kxg2 Nxe1+ 33. Rxe1 Rxd6 34. Kf3 Rd2 35. Rb1 g6 36. b4 axb4 37. Rxb4 Ra2 38. Ke4 h5 39. Kd5 Rc2 40. Rb3 h4 41. Kc6 h3 42. Kxc7 h2 43. Rb1 Rxc3+ 44. Kxb6 Rb3+ 45. Rxb3 h1=Q 46. a5 Qe4 47. Ka7 Qe7+ 48. Ka8 Kg7 49. Rb6 Qc5 0–1

== Reaction ==
A number of commentators expressed regret and surprise over Nepomniachtchi's poor performance in the second half of the match, where he lost three games due to uncharacteristic blunders. The exhausting game six was identified as a possible explanation for the Russian grandmaster's seeming collapse. A typical comment, from the Chess.com summary of the match, reads:

"It's sad; we know what he's [Nepomniachtchi's] capable of and he didn't get to show the world in this match," said GM Robert Hess during the Chess.com broadcast today. The American grandmaster and commentator expressed what seems to be the general feeling in the chess world: that Nepomniachtchi's painful collapse after game six did not reflect the high level that he had shown in the first half of this championship or at the Candidates Tournament.

American grandmaster Sam Shankland put it in the following words:

It really felt like two matches were played. Nepo A played match one, and in my opinion, Nepo A is the second-best player in the world. Nepo B showed up for match two, and that was a farce. I really think if he can manage to consistently bring Nepo A to the board, he can be very ambitious about playing in another world championship match and giving Magnus a better fight someday.

Carlsen, in an interview with Chess24.com immediately after retaining the title, took pride in his performance in game six and said that the lopsided final score may have been the result of that grueling game:

You can point at things he [Nepomniachtchi] could have done differently in every game, of course, but overall I'm happy with my play, very proud of my effort in the 6th game, and that laid the foundation for everything. The final score is probably a bit more lopsided than it could have been, but that's the way some of the other matches also could have gone if I’d gotten a lead.

Oliver Roeder writing in FiveThirtyEight described the match as "featuring both the impressively precise and the inexplicably misguided". Data assembled by Lichess using the Stockfish chess engine estimated that of the 1,034 world chess championship games dating back to 1888, game seven was the most accurate game ever played in world chess championship history, while games three and ten were tied for the second-most accurate; on the other hand, Nepomniachtchi's blunder in game eight made it the 312th least accurate championship game ever.

In an interview a month after the match, former world champion Anatoly Karpov said he felt Nepomniachtchi had played really well in the first half of the match, and had real winning chances in games 1, 2, and 5. Karpov felt Nepomniachtchi had been somewhat unlucky to lose his advantage in game 1 in the middlegame, while in game 5, if Nepomniachtchi had played c4 at the right moment he would have had a pleasant advantage that is difficult to defend against. In the critical game 6, Nepomniachtchi had also gotten very close to a win – although engine analysis showed that the position was balanced, Karpov felt that in a practical game it is difficult to defend White's position under time pressure. This loss turned into a crucial psychological turning point, with Karpov postulating that Nepomniachtchi crumbled when he realized how many chances he had missed. As a result, the second half of the match was not at world championship level – Carlsen won four games out of six, which was not something that has happened since the Interregnum of World Chess Champions in 1948. Nonetheless, Karpov acknowledges that Carlsen has proven he is the world's strongest player and therefore deserves the title.

== Aftermath ==
Per regulation, Carlsen won €1.2 million while Nepomniachtchi took home €800,000. Carlsen won 9 Elo rating points and retained his number one position on the FIDE rating list, while Nepomniachtchi lost 9 points and remained fifth.

Shortly after his victory, Carlsen mentioned that he might not be motivated enough to play another world championship match unless the challenger was Alireza Firouzja, an 18-year-old prodigy who had risen to number two in the world rankings. This was something that surprised former world champion Anatoly Karpov, since Karpov felt that this was the first World Chess Championship that Carlsen won decisively (Carlsen had needed tiebreaks to defeat Sergey Karjakin in 2016 and Fabiano Caruana in 2018, and in Karpov's opinion there were "questions" in his matches against Anand in 2013 and 2014).

As the runner-up, Nepomniachtchi qualified for the Candidates Tournament 2022, an eight-player tournament to select the challenger for the 2023 World Chess Championship. Nepomniachtchi won and was initially expected to challenge Carlsen once again in 2023. However, Carlsen announced in July 2022 that he would not defend his title, citing a lack of motivation, and Nepomniachtchi instead played Ding Liren, the runner-up of the Candidates Tournament.
