= Alexander Grischuk =

Russian chess grandmaster (born 1983)

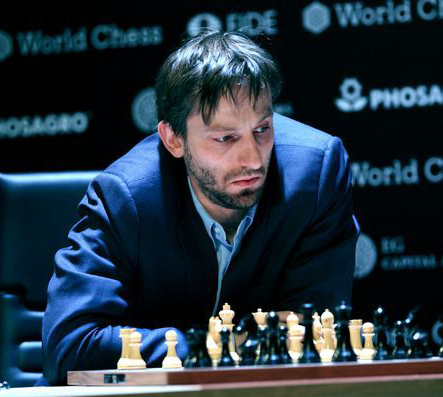
- Grischuk in 2018

Personal information
- Born: Alexander Igorevich Grischuk; October 31, 1983 (age 42) Moscow, Russian SFSR, Soviet Union
- Spouses: Natalia Zhukova (m. 2004, divorced) Kateryna Lagno (m. 2014)

Chess career
- Country: Russia
- Title: International Master (1998) Grandmaster (2000)
- FIDE rating: 2628 (October 2026)
- Peak rating: 2810 (December 2014)
- Ranking: No. 96 (October 2026)
- Peak ranking: No. 3 (May 2014)

Alexander Igorevich Grischuk (Note: Russian: Алекса́ндр И́горевич Грищу́к, Aleksandr Igorevich Grischuk.) (born October 31, 1983) is a Russian chess grandmaster. Grischuk was the Russian champion in 2009. He is also a three-time world blitz chess champion (in 2006, 2012 and 2015).

He has competed in five Candidates Tournaments: in 2007, 2011 (when he reached the final), 2013, 2018 and 2020. He also reached the semifinals of the 2000 FIDE World Championship.

Grischuk has won two team gold medals, three team silvers, one team bronze, and one individual bronze medal at Chess Olympiads. He also holds three team gold medals, one team silver and individual gold, two silver and one bronze from the World Team Chess Championship.

== Chess career ==
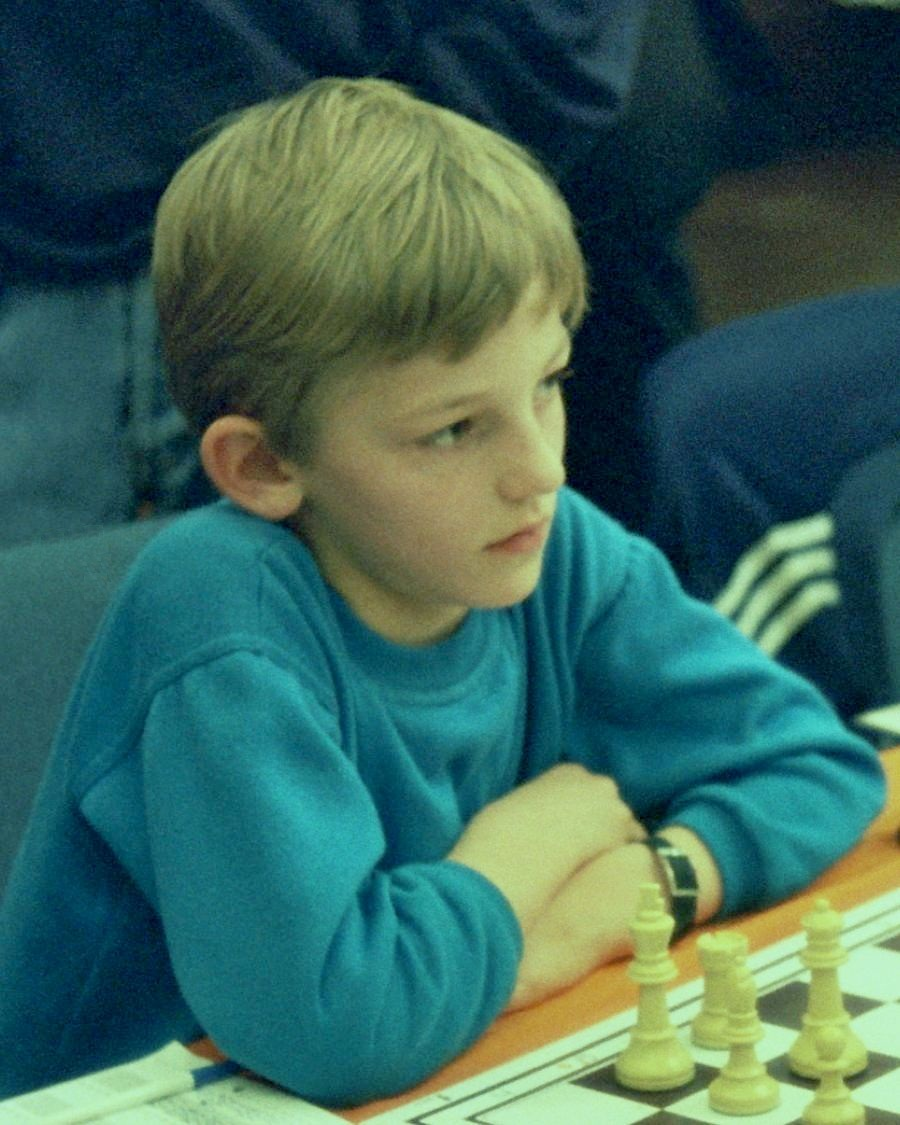
Alexander Grischuk in 1992 at Duisburg, 2nd at the World Chess Championship under 10

In 1996, Grischuk finished in 21st place in the Boys Under-14 section of the World Youth Festival and tied for third place in the same section of the Disney Rapid Chess Championships.

By January 1998 Grischuk had become a FIDE Master, finished 24th in the Moscow leg of the Russian Cup with 6/9, and finished 18th at Nizhnij Novgorod. He finished 44th in his first Russian Chess Championship, scoring 5/11 points, and was International Master and rating favourite when he tied for 8th place at the Boys Under 16 section of the World Youth Championships.

In January 1999, Grischuk tied for 13th at the Hotel Anibal Open, defeating third seed Artashes Minasian in the third round. He started strongly at the Hotel Ubeda Open but slipped to tie for 7th place with 6.5/10. At Bled Open in March he finished 9th with 6/9 and at the Biel MTO Open in July finished 11th with 7/10. At the Porto San Giorgio Grischuk finished 4th with 6.5/9. In November 1999, Grischuk scored 7/9 to share first place with Sergei Volkov at the Chigorin Memorial. He made four draws as reserve board at the European Team Championship held in Batumi then was knocked out of the Russian Championship in the quarterfinals by Alexei Bezgodov.

Grischuk made his first Grandmaster norm in January 2000 at the Hotel Ubeda Open scoring 7/10 for 4th place then placed 4th at the Reykjavik Open, scoring 6.5/9. At the New York Open he finished 10th with 6.5/9. In June 2000, he won the Lausanne Young Masters, defeating Ruslan Ponomariov in the final. His success gave him his first appearance in the FIDE Top 100 at 78th, with 2606 and third top Junior in July 2000. Grischuk finished 4th on tiebreaks with 5/9 at the North Sea Cup. Now a Grandmaster, he finished third with 6/11 at the 4th Russian Cup Final in Elista and won the Torshavn International in October on tiebreak with Ponomariov. He claimed individual bronze medal for his second reserve board result at the Chess Olympiad in Istanbul. In the 2000 FIDE World Chess Championship, Grischuk reached the semifinals, losing to Alexei Shirov.

In September 2001, Grischuk scored 4/6 at the inaugural Russia-Chess Summit. In January 2002, he finished second at his first Corus event with 8.5/13, half a point behind Evgeny Bareev.

In the 2004 FIDE World Chess Championship he made it to the quarterfinals, where he lost 3−1 to eventual champion Rustam Kasimdzhanov. Also he shared 1st place in the traditional tournament at Poikovsky (with Sergey Rublevsky); 2nd place at the Russian Championship (behind Kasparov).

Alexander Grischuk in 2005

Grischuk finished in the top 10 in the 2005 FIDE World Cup, qualifying him for the 2007 Candidates Tournament in May–June 2007. He won his matches against Vladimir Malakhov (+2 −0 =3) and Sergei Rublevsky (tied at +1 −1 =4, winning the rapid playoff +2 −0 =1), to advance to the eight-player 2007 FIDE World Chess Championship. In that tournament he scored 5½ out of 14, placing last in the eight-player field.

In 2009, Grischuk won the Russian Chess Championship. Later that year he won the Linares tournament on tiebreak over Vasyl Ivanchuk after being invited as replacement for Veselin Topalov, who was in the Challenger's Match against Gata Kamsky.

Grischuk finished third in the 2008–10 FIDE Grand Prix, qualifying him as the first alternate for the Candidates Tournament of the 2012 World Chess Championship cycle. Upon the withdrawal of world No. 2 Magnus Carlsen from the candidates tournament, Grischuk was appointed to take his place. In the 2011 candidates tournament, Grischuk was seeded 6th out of eight players, and faced Levon Aronian in the first round. After splitting the four regular games 2–2, Grischuk won the rapid playoff 2½–1½ to advance to the semifinals, where he faced world No. 4 and former World Champion Vladimir Kramnik. Grischuk won the blitz playoff by 1½–½ to advance to the final, where he faced 2009 Chess World Cup winner Boris Gelfand for the right to play Viswanathan Anand for the World Championship. After five draws, Gelfand won the final game to win the match, 3½–2½.

Grischuk played in the 2013 Candidates Tournament in London from 15 March to 1 April. He finished sixth, with a score of 6½/14 (+1=11-2). In November 2014 he took first place with 5½/7 at the Tashir Chess Tournament in memory of Tigran Petrosian in Moscow. This enabled him to cross the 2800 Elo rating mark.

In July 2016, Grischuk won a four-game match against Ding Liren in Wenzhou, 2½–1½. In February 2017 Grischuk tied for first place with Maxime Vachier-Lagrave and Shakhriyar Mamedyarov in the first event of the FIDE Grand Prix series, held in Sharjah, UAE, taking first place on tiebreak. In July 2017, he beat Yu Yangyi 3–1 in the China-Russia Chess Grandmaster Summit Match held in Jiayuguan, China.

In December 2017, Grischuk won the men's Basque chess event of the IMSA Elite Mind Games in Huai'an, China.

In late May 2019, Grischuk participated in the Moscow FIDE Grand Prix tournament, which is part of the qualification cycle for the 2020 World Chess Championship. The tournament was a 16-player event. Grischuk was defeated by compatriot GM Ian Nepomniachtchi in rapid tiebreaks during the tournament finale. By finishing second in the tournament, Grischuk netted 7 Grand Prix points. Grischuk then reached the semi-finals at Riga, and won the Hamburg tournament, for a total of 20 Grand Prix points. He was confirmed as a qualifier for the Candidates Tournament 2020 after the second day of the Jerusalem Grand Prix.

From March 16 to March 26, 2020, Grischuk played the Candidates Tournament, interrupted by FIDE after round 7 due to the COVID-19 pandemic. At the time of the interruption he was one point behind the leading pair made up of Ian Nepomniachtchi and Maxime Vachier-Lagrave. From April 19–27, 2021 Grischuk played again at the Candidates Tournament, resumed by FIDE after more than a year, finishing in sixth place, with 7 points out of 14. Through February and March 2022, Grischuk played in the FIDE Grand Prix 2022. In the first leg, he placed third in Pool A with a 3/6 result. In the second leg, he finished fourth in Pool A with a result of 2/6, finishing 22nd in the standings with two points.

== Team results ==
=== Chess Olympiads ===
Olympiad	Individual result	Team result
Istanbul 2000	7.5/10 (Bronze)	Gold
Bled 2002	7/11 (18th)	Gold
Calvia 2004	6.5/11 (30th)	Silver
Turin 2006	7/11 (25th)	6th
Dresden 2008	4.5/8 (10th)	5th
Khanty-Mansiysk 2010	6/9 (4th)	Silver
Istanbul 2012	7/11 (5th)	Silver
Tromso 2014	6/9 (10th)	4th
Baku 2016	6.5/9	Bronze

== Blitz chess ==
In 2006 Grischuk won the World Blitz Chess Championship in Rishon Lezion, Israel, with 10½/15. He won his second World Blitz Championship in 2012 in Astana, Kazakhstan, with 20 points out of 30 games. In October 2015, Grischuk won the World Blitz Championship for the third time in Berlin with a score of 15½/21, half a point ahead of Maxime Vachier-Lagrave and Vladimir Kramnik.

In 2023, he won Tata Steel India Blitz open ahead of joint second place finishers Nodirbek Abdusattorov and Praggnanandhaa Rameshbabu.

== Personal life ==
Grischuk was formerly married to Ukrainian chess grandmaster Natalia Zhukova. He is now married to Ukrainian-Russian grandmaster Kateryna Lagno and they have three children together.

Following Russia's invasion of Ukraine in February 2022, Grischuk has publicly expressed his opposition to the war and Russia's military aggression. Although he didn't join 44 other elite Russian chess players in signing an open letter condemning the invasion and directly addressed to President Vladimir Putin, FIDE General Director Emil Sutovsky wrote on Twitter that FIDE Grand Prix 2022 participants, among them Grischuk himself and fellow Russian Grandmaster Nikita Vitiugov, were unlikely to sign the letter in time due to 'technical reasons'. Grischuk nonetheless expressed his disapproval for the invasion in a post-game interview during the Grand Prix tournament in Belgrade, Serbia.

== Notes ==
Awards
Preceded by Viswanathan Anand; Levon Aronian; Magnus Carlsen	World Blitz Chess Champion; 2006; 2012; 2015	Succeeded by Vasyl Ivanchuk; Lê Quang Liêm; Sergey Karjakin
Preceded by Peter Svidler	Russian Chess Champion; 2009	Succeeded by Ian Nepomniachtchi
