= Candidates Tournament 2020–2021 =

Chess tournament in Yekaterinburg, Russia

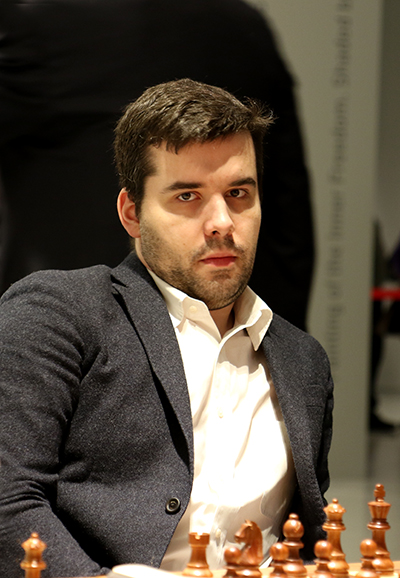
- Ian Nepomniachtchi, the winner of the tournament, advanced to the World Chess Championship 2021 match.
- Location: Yekaterinburg, Russia
- Dates: 17–26 March 2020, 19–28 April 2021
- Competitors: 8 from 5 nations
- Winning score: 8.5 points of 14

Champion
- (Russia) Ian Nepomniachtchi

The 2020–2021 Candidates Tournament was an eight-player chess double-round-robin tournament to decide the challenger for the World Chess Championship 2021, played in Yekaterinburg, Russia. Ian Nepomniachtchi won the tournament with a round to spare and earned the right to challenge the defending world champion, Magnus Carlsen.

The first half of the tournament was played from 17 to 25 March 2020. It was suspended at the halfway point due to the COVID-19 pandemic, with the second half of the tournament played from 19 to 27 April 2021. Over 13 months from beginning to end, it is believed to be the longest over-the-board chess tournament in history.

== Participants ==
The qualifiers for the Candidates Tournament were:

Qualification method	Player	Age	Rating	World ranking
Qualification method	Player	(March 2020)		
2018 World Championship runner-up	(United States) Fabiano Caruana	27	2842	2
The top two finishers at the Chess World Cup 2019	(Azerbaijan) ~~Teimour Radjabov~~ (winner) (Withdrew)	33	2765	9
The top two finishers at the Chess World Cup 2019	(China) Ding Liren (runner-up)	27	2805	3
The top finisher in the FIDE Grand Swiss Tournament 2019	(China) Wang Hao (winner)	30	2762	12
The top two finishers in the FIDE Grand Prix 2019	(Russia) Alexander Grischuk (winner)	36	2777	4
The top two finishers in the FIDE Grand Prix 2019	(Russia) Ian Nepomniachtchi (runner-up)	29	2774	5
Highest average rating	(Netherlands) Anish Giri	25	2763	11
Highest average rating	(France) Maxime Vachier-Lagrave (replacement for Radjabov)	29	2767	8
Wild card chosen by organizer, subject to eligibility criteria	(Russia) Kirill Alekseenko	22	2698	39

The regulations stated that if one or more players declined the invitation to play in the Candidates Tournament, the players with the next highest average ratings would qualify. On 6 March, this rule was used to select Vachier-Lagrave, after Radjabov withdrew.

Compared to previous cycles (2014, 2016, 2018), the Grand Swiss was a new addition, and the number of qualifiers by rating was reduced from two to one. The format of the Grand Prix tournament was also changed.

=== Qualifier by rating ===
The qualifier on rating was the player with the highest average rating for the 12 ratings periods from February 2019 to January 2020, who did not qualify by another method. To be eligible, a player must have played at least 30 games during the 12 ratings periods, and at least 18 in the final 6 ratings periods.

The following table shows the ratings of the players with the top average ratings from February 2019 to January 2020. It includes the first eleven players except for world champion Magnus Carlsen, Fabiano Caruana (who qualified as the 2018 challenger), Ding Liren (who qualified as a finalist of the 2019 World Cup), Alexander Grischuk and Ian Nepomniachtchi (the winner and runner-up of the 2019 FIDE Grand Prix). All of the players in the table met the above game count requirements.

The qualifier by rating was Anish Giri. Since Radjabov withdrew, Maxime Vachier-Lagrave also ended up qualifying by rating.

R	Player	Feb 2019	Mar 2019	Apr 2019	May 2019	Jun 2019	Jul 2019	Aug 2019	Sep 2019	Oct 2019	Nov 2019	Dec 2019	Jan 2020	Average Rating
4	(Netherlands) Anish Giri	2797	2797	2797	2787	2779	2779	2779	2780	2780	2776	2769	2768	2782.33
5	(France) Maxime Vachier-Lagrave	2780	2775	2773	2780	2779	2775	2778	2774	2774	2777	2780	2770	2776.25
6	(Azerbaijan) Shakhriyar Mamedyarov	2790	2790	2793	2781	2774	2765	2764	2767	2767	2772	2772	2770	2775.42
9	(India) Viswanathan Anand	2779	2779	2774	2774	2767	2764	2756	2765	2765	2757	2757	2758	2766.25
10	(Armenia) Levon Aronian	2767	2761	2763	2762	2752	2756	2765	2758	2758	2772	2775	2773	2763.50
11	(United States) Wesley So	2765	2762	2762	2754	2754	2763	2776	2767	2767	2760	2760	2765	2762.91

=== Wild card ===
One wild card was selected by the organizer. This player must have participated in at least two of the three qualifying tournaments (World Cup, Grand Swiss and Grand Prix) and also must have met one of the following conditions: highest non-qualifier in the World Cup and also in the final 4 of the World Cup; highest non-qualifier in the Grand Swiss or Grand Prix; or in the top 10 by average rating from February 2019 to January 2020.

Four players were eligible: Maxime Vachier-Lagrave (third in the World Cup, third in the Grand Prix, fifth on the rating list); Kirill Alekseenko (highest non-qualifier in the Grand Swiss and also played in the World Cup); Shakhriyar Mamedyarov (sixth on the rating list, played in the World Cup and Grand Prix) and Levon Aronian (tenth on the rating list, played in the World Cup and Grand Prix). Viswanathan Anand was ninth on the rating list but only participated in the Grand Swiss, and thus was ineligible to be picked as the wild card player.

On 11 November 2019, Andrey Filatov, the president of the Russian Chess Federation, announced the intention to use the wild card to choose a Russian player, stating: "The decision to host this event in Russia guarantees that there will be a Russian player participating. We’re still considering different options how we’ll choose a Russian wild-card, but it will probably be a match or match-tournament with Kirill Alekseenko [...]." At the time of the announcement no Russian had qualified for the Candidates; and Alekseenko, Grischuk and Nepomniachtchi were sure to be eligible for the wild card, although the latter two also had a chance to qualify via the Grand Prix.

On 22 December 2019, the Grand Prix results were finalised, with Grischuk and Nepomniachtchi qualifying, meaning Alekseenko was the only Russian eligible for the wild card.

On 23 December 2019, the Russian Chess Federation officially nominated Kirill Alekseenko as the wild card.

On the same day, managers of Maxime Vachier-Lagrave expressed their concern with the current FIDE rules in an open letter to the Russian Chess Federation, asking to organize a match between Vachier-Lagrave and Alekseenko for their wild card placement, on the basis that Vachier-Lagrave was eligible for the wild card in three different ways. However, Alekseenko was confirmed as the wild card. Alekseenko himself encouraged the abolition of the wild card in a later interview.

== Organization ==
The tournament was an eight-player, double-round-robin tournament, meaning there were 14 rounds with each player facing each other twice: once with the black pieces and once with the white pieces. The tournament winner qualified to play Magnus Carlsen for the World Championship late in 2021.

=== Regulations ===
The time control was 100 minutes for the first 40 moves, 50 minutes for the next 20 moves and then 15 minutes for the rest of the game; plus a 30-second increment per move starting from move 1.

In the event of a tie, tie breaks were applied in the following order: 1) head-to-head score among tied players, 2) total number of wins, 3) Sonneborn–Berger score (SB), 4) rapid chess tie-break games (for first place only). If more than two players were tied for first after the first three tie-break methods, then the two players to play the tie-break were to be decided by lot.

The prize money was: €48,000 for first place, €36,000 for second place, €24,000 for third place (with players on the same number of points sharing prize money, irrespective of tie-breaks); plus €7,000 per point for every player; giving a total prize pool of €500,000.

=== Schedule ===
FIDE announced the pairings on 14 February 2020. The original schedule had the final round on 3 April and the closing ceremony on 4 April 2020. The revised schedule was announced on 16 February 2021.

All games began at 16:00 local time (11:00 UTC), except Round 14, which began at 15:00 local time (10:00 UTC).

Players from the same country had to play each other in the earlier rounds. Ding Liren and Wang Hao played each other in rounds 1 and 8; while Grischuk, Nepomniachtchi and Alekseenko played each other in rounds 1 to 3 and rounds 8 to 10.

Date	Day	Event
16 March 2020	Monday	Opening ceremony
17 March 2020	Tuesday	Round 1
18 March 2020	Wednesday	Round 2
19 March 2020	Thursday	Round 3
20 March 2020	Friday	Rest day
21 March 2020	Saturday	Round 4
22 March 2020	Sunday	Round 5
23 March 2020	Monday	Round 6
24 March 2020	Tuesday	Rest day
25 March 2020	Wednesday	Round 7

Date	Day	Event
19 April 2021	Monday	Round 8
20 April 2021	Tuesday	Round 9
21 April 2021	Wednesday	Round 10
22 April 2021	Thursday	Rest day
23 April 2021	Friday	Round 11
24 April 2021	Saturday	Round 12
25 April 2021	Sunday	Rest day
26 April 2021	Monday	Round 13
27 April 2021	Tuesday	Round 14
28 April 2021	Wednesday	Tie breaks (if required); Closing ceremony

== Impact of coronavirus on the tournament ==
=== Ding Liren and Wang Hao ===
The COVID-19 pandemic, which was mainly confined to China in January and early February 2020, affected the preparation of the Chinese players, Wang Hao and Ding Liren. On 10 February, both players admitted that they cancelled their training camps and had to prepare online with their assistants: Ding Liren was training in his home city of Wenzhou; while Wang Hao was out of China, and planned to only briefly return to China before the Candidates. Wang Hao later decided to not return to China at all before the tournament.

On 19 February, Russia announced a partial ban on Chinese nationals entering the country due to the coronavirus outbreak in China. FIDE announced that the Chinese delegation was travelling on humanitarian visas and therefore would be permitted to enter Russia, but they were advised to come "well in advance" before the tournament.

On 2 March, Ding Liren and his team passed the Russian border control in Moscow and went to an isolated cottage house at the outskirts of Moscow, for two weeks of medical quarantine and observation before the start of the tournament.

=== Radjabov withdraws, replaced by Vachier-Lagrave ===
On 6 March, citing concerns over the COVID-19 pandemic and FIDE's handling of the related risk-management, Teimour Radjabov withdrew from the tournament. His place was filled by Maxime Vachier-Lagrave, as he was next on the qualifier by rating list.

Radjabov had asked FIDE to postpone the event due to the coronavirus outbreak. FIDE responded that this could not be done "legally and practically", and gave Radjabov until 6 March to confirm his participation; Radjabov responded by formally withdrawing.

=== FIDE's new regulations on playing conditions ===
On 6 March, FIDE announced that the tournament could only be postponed by order of the Russian authorities, and stated this again on 14 March: "It is not the responsibility of FIDE to cancel FIDE-rated tournaments in any given Federation. Each Federation may take their own decisions ..."

FIDE also announced health and safety measures, including screening of visitors for body temperature, and making handshakes optional.

If one of the players would test positive for COVID-19, the tournament would be stopped immediately and resumed later in the year, with points counting from games already played.

=== FIDE suspends the tournament ===
The first seven rounds proceeded as scheduled, between 17 and 25 March, with round eight scheduled for 26 March. But on 26 March, the Russian government announced an interruption of air traffic with foreign countries, taking effect on 27 March. This prompted FIDE to suspend the tournament on 26 March, as FIDE could not guarantee players' and officials' return upon the completion of the tournament. Under the tournament conditions, the scores from the first seven rounds were retained.

=== The status of Radjabov ===
As a consequence of the postponement, Radjabov called for his reinstatement in the tournament, as well as considering legal action if he were not reinstated. In a May 2020 interview, FIDE President Arkady Dvorkovich indicated that his preference was to give Radjabov a wildcard for the next cycle in 2022, subject to approval from the FIDE Council.

In May 2021, FIDE confirmed that Radjabov was a qualifier for the 2022 Candidates Tournament.

=== Resumption of the tournament ===
A resumption was initially announced by FIDE on 8 September 2020. The tournament was rescheduled in the same host city of Yekaterinburg, with the 8th round starting on 1 November 2020. Tbilisi, Georgia, was named as a reserve venue.

However, on 16 October 2020, FIDE postponed the resumption of the tournament, until the (Northern hemisphere) spring of 2021. This was due to ongoing concerns about COVID-19, as well as the fact that the championship match with Carlsen was scheduled for November to December 2021, so it was not necessary to conclude the Candidates in 2020. Dvorkovich said that Yekaterinburg was still the likely venue.

On 16 February 2021, FIDE announced that the second half of the tournament would be played between 19 and 28 April, in Yekaterinburg.

== Results ==
=== Standings ===
Standings of the 2020–21 Candidates Tournament
Rank	Player	Score	H2H	Wins	SB	Qualification	NEP		MVL		GIR		CAR		DIN		GRI		ALE		WAN	
1	Ian Nepomniachtchi (RUS)	8.5	—	5	55	Advance to title match			½	0	½	1	½	½	1	0	½	½	1	½	1	1
2	Maxime Vachier-Lagrave (FRA)	8	—	4	53.75		1	½			½	½	½	0	1	½	½	0	1	½	1	½
3	Anish Giri (NED)	7.5	1.5	4	50.5		0	½	½	½			½	1	1	½	½	0	0	1	1	½
4	Fabiano Caruana (USA)	7.5	0.5	3	50.5		½	½	1	½	0	½			½	0	½	½	1	½	½	1
5	Ding Liren (CHN)	7	1.5	4	48.75		1	0	½	0	½	0	1	½			1	½	½	1	0	½
6	Alexander Grischuk (RUS)	7	0.5	2	50.5		½	½	1	½	1	½	½	½	½	0			½	0	½	½
7	Kirill Alekseenko (RUS)	5.5	—	2	38.5		½	0	½	0	0	1	½	0	0	½	1	½			½	½
8	Wang Hao (CHN)	5	—	1	34.5		0	0	½	0	½	0	0	½	½	1	½	½	½	½		

Source: Official website Chess.com
Rules for classification: 1) points; 2) head-to-head score among tied players; 3) total number of wins; 4) Sonneborn–Berger score (SB); 5) tie-break games.

Note: Numbers in the crosstable in a white background indicate the result playing the respective opponent with the white pieces (black pieces if on a black background).

=== Overview ===
Nepomniachtchi took an early lead with wins in rounds 1, 5 and 6, but was caught by Vachier-Lagrave, who defeated him in round 7. The tournament was halted at the halfway point, with every player having played each other once. Vachier-Lagrave and Nepomniachtchi shared the lead on 4½/7, with Vachier-Lagrave's win in their individual game putting him provisionally ahead on tie-breaks. A point behind on 3½ were Caruana, Giri, Grischuk and Wang Hao. Ding Liren, who was one of the pre-tournament favourites, started the tournament badly with two consecutive losses, and shared last place on 2½ with Alekseenko.

When the tournament resumed, Caruana sprung a spectacular novelty on Vachier-Lagrave to eventually defeat him in round 8, and Nepomniachtchi was again the sole leader, a lead he extended to one point with a win over Alekseenko in round 10. Giri moved to within half a point of the lead (but with a worse tie-break than Nepomniachtchi) with wins over Wang Hao and Ding Liren in rounds 9 and 11. In round 12 Giri faced third-placed Caruana, in a game which both needed to win; Giri won, but Nepomniachtchi won against Wang Hao and kept his half-point lead; giving lead standings of Nepomniachtchi 8, Giri 7½, and Vachier-Lagrave 6½.

In round 13, both Giri (against Grischuk) and Vachier-Lagrave (against Nepomniachtchi) played for wins with the black pieces, but both obtained inferior positions. When Nepomniachtchi saw that Giri was losing, he offered Vachier-Lagrave a draw, which was accepted. This left the standings at Nepomniachtchi 8½, Giri 7½, Vachier-Lagrave and Caruana 7. With a superior tie break due to his 1½–½ head-to-head score against Giri, Nepomniachtchi won the tournament with one round to spare.

=== Results by round ===
First named player is white. 1–0 indicates a white win, 0–1 indicates a black win, and ½–½ indicates a draw. Numbers in parentheses show players' scores prior to the round.

Round 1 (17 March 2020)
Maxime Vachier-Lagrave (0)	½–½	Fabiano Caruana (0)	C78 Ruy Lopez
Ding Liren (0)	0–1	Wang Hao (0)	A20 English
Anish Giri (0)	0–1	Ian Nepomniachtchi (0)	A33 English, Symmetrical
Alexander Grischuk (0)	½–½	Kirill Alekseenko (0)	A20 English
Round 2 (18 March 2020)
Fabiano Caruana (½)	1–0	Kirill Alekseenko (½)	E20 Nimzo-Indian
Ian Nepomniachtchi (1)	½–½	Alexander Grischuk (½)	C67 Ruy Lopez
Wang Hao (1)	½–½	Anish Giri (0)	A37 English, Symmetrical
Maxime Vachier-Lagrave (½)	1–0	Ding Liren (0)	C84 Ruy Lopez, Closed
Round 3 (19 March 2020)
Ding Liren (0)	1–0	Fabiano Caruana (1½)	D17 Queen's Gambit Declined Slav
Anish Giri (½)	½–½	Maxime Vachier-Lagrave (1½)	D85 Grunfeld
Alexander Grischuk (1)	½–½	Wang Hao (1½)	C01 French, Exchange
Kirill Alekseenko (½)	½–½	Ian Nepomniachtchi (1½)	C18 French, Winawer
Round 4 (21 March 2020)
Fabiano Caruana (1½)	½–½	Ian Nepomniachtchi (2)	D87 Grunfeld, Exchange
Wang Hao (2)	½–½	Kirill Alekseenko (1)	D78 Neo-Grunfeld, 6.O-O c6
Maxime Vachier-Lagrave (2)	½–½	Alexander Grischuk (1½)	C67 Ruy Lopez
Ding Liren (1)	½–½	Anish Giri (1)	E00 Queen's Pawn Game
Round 5 (22 March 2020)
Anish Giri (1½)	½–½	Fabiano Caruana (2)	D12 Queen's Gambit Declined Slav
Alexander Grischuk (2)	½–½	Ding Liren (1½)	C84 Ruy Lopez, Closed
Kirill Alekseenko (1½)	½–½	Maxime Vachier-Lagrave (2½)	B80 Sicilian, Scheveningen
Ian Nepomniachtchi (2½)	1–0	Wang Hao (2½)	C42 Petrov Defense
Round 6 (23 March 2020)
Alexander Grischuk (2½)	½–½	Fabiano Caruana (2½)	C78 Ruy Lopez
Kirill Alekseenko (2)	0–1	Anish Giri (2)	C50 Giuoco Piano
Ian Nepomniachtchi (3½)	1–0	Ding Liren (2)	C78 Ruy Lopez
Wang Hao (2½)	½–½	Maxime Vachier-Lagrave (3)	D87 Grunfeld, Exchange
Round 7 (25 March 2020)
Fabiano Caruana (3)	½–½	Wang Hao (3)	C42 Petrov Defense
Maxime Vachier-Lagrave (3½)	1–0	Ian Nepomniachtchi (4½)	C18 French, Winawer
Ding Liren (2)	½–½	Kirill Alekseenko (2)	E00 Queen's Pawn Game
Anish Giri (3)	½–½	Alexander Grischuk (3)	A20 English
Round 8 (19 April 2021)
Fabiano Caruana (3½)	1–0	Maxime Vachier-Lagrave (4½)	B97 Sicilian, Najdorf
Wang Hao (3½)	½–½	Ding Liren (2½)	C45 Scotch Game
Ian Nepomniachtchi (4½)	½–½	Anish Giri (3½)	B33 Sicilian
Kirill Alekseenko (2½)	1–0	Alexander Grischuk (3½)	C11 French
Round 9 (20 April 2021)
Kirill Alekseenko (3½)	½–½	Fabiano Caruana (4½)	C53 Giuoco Piano
Alexander Grischuk (3½)	½–½	Ian Nepomniachtchi (5)	D85 Grunfeld
Anish Giri (4)	1–0	Wang Hao (4)	E06 Catalan, Closed, 5.Nf3
Ding Liren (3)	½–½	Maxime Vachier-Lagrave (4½)	E61 King's Indian
Round 10 (21 April 2021)
Fabiano Caruana (5)	½–½	Ding Liren (3½)	C84 Ruy Lopez, Closed
Maxime Vachier-Lagrave (5)	½–½	Anish Giri (5)	B33 Sicilian
Wang Hao (4)	½–½	Alexander Grischuk (4)	C11 French
Ian Nepomniachtchi (5½)	1–0	Kirill Alekseenko (4)	A13 English
Round 11 (23 April 2021)
Ian Nepomniachtchi (6½)	½–½	Fabiano Caruana (5½)	C47 Four Knights
Kirill Alekseenko (4)	½–½	Wang Hao (4½)	C55 Two Knights Defense
Alexander Grischuk (4½)	1–0	Maxime Vachier-Lagrave (5½)	B23 Sicilian, Closed
Anish Giri (5½)	1–0	Ding Liren (4)	C85 Ruy Lopez, Exchange Variation Doubly Deferred
Round 12 (24 April 2021)
Fabiano Caruana (6)	0–1	Anish Giri (6½)	B45 Sicilian, Taimanov
Ding Liren (4)	1–0	Alexander Grischuk (5½)	D37 Queen's Gambit Declined
Maxime Vachier-Lagrave (5½)	1–0	Kirill Alekseenko (4½)	B12 Caro-Kann Defense
Wang Hao (5)	0–1	Ian Nepomniachtchi (7)	C42 Petrov Defense
Round 13 (26 April 2021)
Wang Hao (5)	0–1	Fabiano Caruana (6)	B40 Sicilian
Ian Nepomniachtchi (8)	½–½	Maxime Vachier-Lagrave (6½)	A15 English
Kirill Alekseenko (4½)	0–1	Ding Liren (5)	C53 Giuoco Piano
Alexander Grischuk (5½)	1–0	Anish Giri (7½)	E16 Queen's Indian
Round 14 (27 April 2021)
Fabiano Caruana (7)	½–½	Alexander Grischuk (6½)	B45 Sicilian, Taimanov
Anish Giri (7½)	0–1	Kirill Alekseenko (4½)	E01 Catalan, Closed
Ding Liren (6)	1–0	Ian Nepomniachtchi (8½)	D70 Neo-Grunfeld Defense
Maxime Vachier-Lagrave (7)	1–0	Wang Hao (5)	C67 Ruy Lopez

=== Points by round ===
For each player, the difference between wins and losses after each round is shown. The players with the highest difference for each round are marked with green background. The players with no more chance of advancing to the title match, in each round, are marked with red background.

Final rank	Player	Rounds													
Final rank	Player	1	2	3	4	5	6	7	8	9	10	11	12	13	14
1	Ian Nepomniachtchi (RUS)	+1	+1	+1	+1	+2	+3	+2	+2	+2	+3	+3	+4	+4	+3
2	Maxime Vachier-Lagrave (FRA)	=	+1	+1	+1	+1	+1	+2	+1	+1	+1	=	+1	+1	+2
3	Anish Giri (NED)	−1	−1	−1	−1	−1	=	=	=	+1	+1	+2	+3	+2	+1
4	Fabiano Caruana (USA)	=	+1	=	=	=	=	=	+1	+1	+1	+1	=	+1	+1
5	Ding Liren (CHN)	−1	−2	−1	−1	−1	−2	−2	−2	−2	−2	−3	−2	−1	=
6	Alexander Grischuk (RUS)	=	=	=	=	=	=	=	−1	−1	−1	=	−1	=	=
7	Kirill Alekseenko (RUS)	=	−1	−1	−1	−1	−2	−2	−1	−1	−2	−2	−3	−4	−3
8	Wang Hao (CHN)	+1	+1	+1	+1	=	=	=	=	−1	−1	−1	−2	−3	−4

== Books ==
- Grandmaster Dorian Rogozenco (2021). Eight Good Men: The 2020-2021 Candidates Tournament. [Limited Liability Company Elk and Ruby Publishing House]. ISBN 978-5604-17707-5.
