= FIDE Grand Prix 2019 =

Chess tournament series

FIDE Grand Prix Series 2019
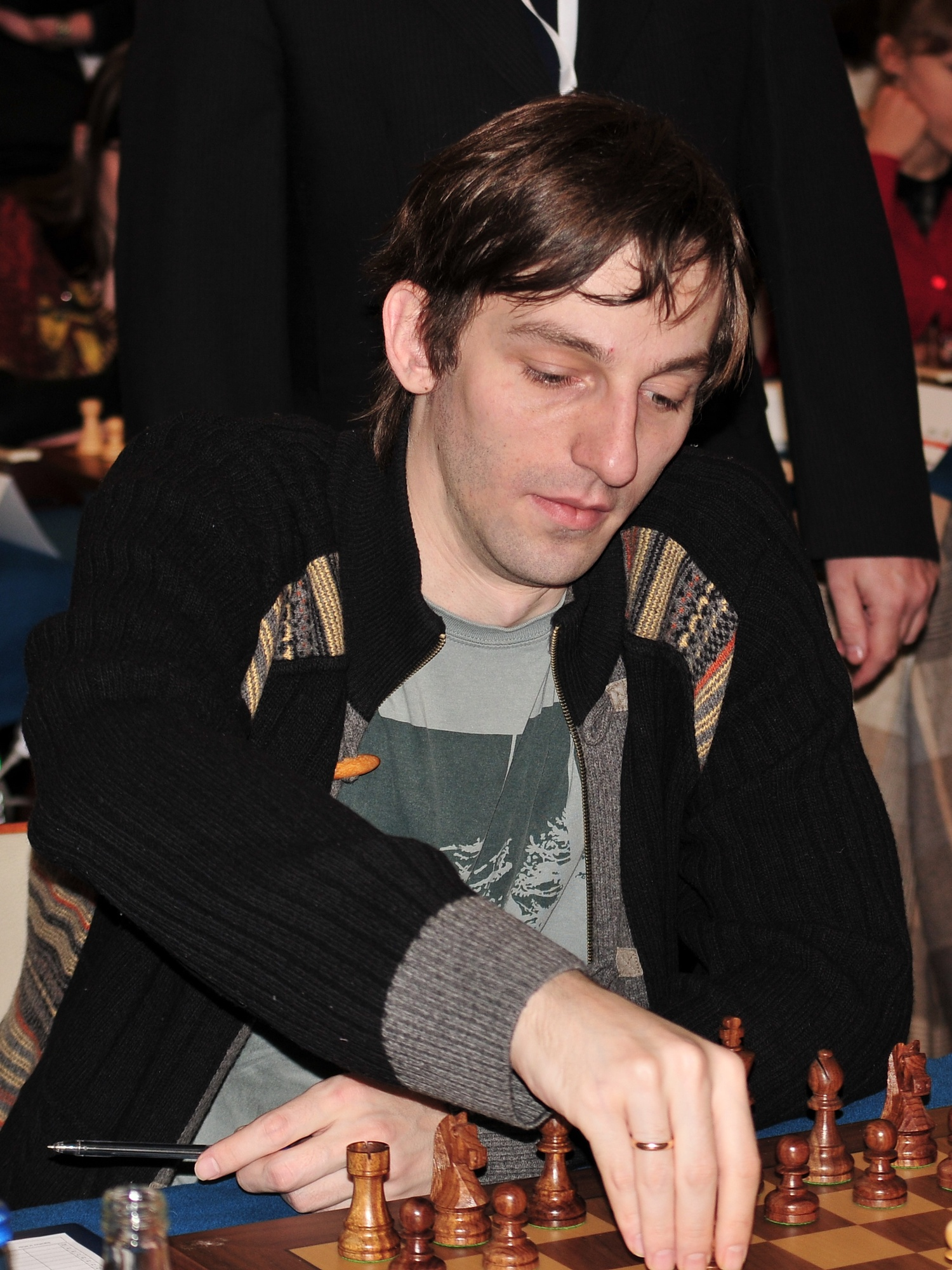
- FIDE Grand Prix 2019 winner Alexander Grischuk

Tournament information
- Sport: Chess
- Location: (Russia) Moscow (Latvia) Riga (Germany) Hamburg (Israel) Jerusalem
- Dates: 17 May 2019– 23 December 2019
- Administrator: FIDE
- Tournament format: Series of single-elimination tournaments
- Venues: Central Chess Club; National Library of Latvia; Theater Kehrwieder; Notre Dame of Jerusalem Center

Final positions
- Champion: (Russia) Alexander Grischuk
- Runner-up: (Russia) Ian Nepomniachtchi

Tournament 1
- Location: Moscow
- Dates: 17–29 May 2019
- Champion: Ian Nepomniachtchi
- Runner-up: Alexander Grischuk

Tournament 2
- Location: Riga
- Dates: 12–24 July 2019
- Champion: Shakhriyar Mamedyarov
- Runner-up: Maxime Vachier-Lagrave

Tournament 3
- Location: Hamburg
- Dates: 5–17 November 2019
- Champion: Alexander Grischuk
- Runner-up: Jan-Krzysztof Duda

Tournament 4
- Location: Jerusalem
- Dates: 11–23 December 2019
- Champion: Ian Nepomniachtchi
- Runner-up: Wei Yi

The FIDE Grand Prix 2019 was a series of four chess tournaments that formed part of the qualification cycle for the World Chess Championship 2021. The top two finishers who had not yet qualified, qualified for the Candidates Tournament 2020–2021. The top non-qualifying finisher was eligible for the wild card. The series was organized by World Chess, formerly known as Agon. Alexander Grischuk won the FIDE Grand Prix 2019 and thus became the first player to qualify for the Candidates Tournament via the event. Ian Nepomniachtchi, who finished in second place, was the other qualifier, while Maxime Vachier-Lagrave, by finishing third, became eligible for the wild card. Maxime Vachier-Lagrave eventually got a place in the Candidates after Teimour Radjabov withdrew from the tournament as he was the first reserve (by average rating).

== Format ==
There were four tournaments in the cycle; each consisted of 16 players. There were 21 contestants, who each played in 3 of the 4 tournaments.

The tournaments were knock-out tournaments, in the same style as the Chess World Cup. At each round of the tournament, players played a best-of-2 game knock-out match. The regular games were:

- best-of-2 games at a time limit of 90 minutes, + 30 minutes added after move 40, + 30 second per move increment from move 1.

If the match was tied 1-1, up to four tie breaks were played, at progressively faster time limits, with the match ending when a player won any tie break. The tie breaks were, in order:

- best-of-2 games at a time limit of 25 minutes, + 10 second per move increment from move 1.
- best-of-2 games at a time limit of 10 minutes, + 10 second per move increment from move 1.
- best-of-2 games at a time limit of 5 minutes, + 3 second per move increment from move 1.
- a single Armageddon chess game: white received 5 minutes + 2 second per move increment from move 61; black received 4 minutes + 2 second per move increment from move 61; black won the match in the case of a draw.

=== Scoring and tie breaks ===
Players received Grand Prix points as follows:

Round	Grand Prix points
Winner	8
Runner-Up	5
Semi-final loser	3
Round 2 loser	1
Round 1 loser	0
Each match won without a tie-break	+1

The two players with most Grand Prix points qualified for the Candidates Tournament 2020–2021. In the event of a tie on Grand Prix points, the following tie breaks were applied, in order:

1. most tournament wins;
2. most tournament second places;
3. most points won in standard time control games;
4. head-to-head score, in terms of matches, between players tied;
5. drawing of lots.

=== Dates and locations ===
The tournament dates and locations were as follows:

- Moscow, Russia, 17–29 May 2019;
- Riga, Latvia, 12–24 July 2019;
- Hamburg, Germany, 5–17 November 2019;
- Jerusalem, Israel, 11–23 December 2019.

=== Prize money ===
The prize money was €130,000 per single Grand Prix with an additional €280,000 for the overall Grand Prix standings for a total prize fund of €800,000.

For each individual tournament, the prize money was: €24,000 for the winner, €14,000 for the runner-up, €10,000 for the semi-final losers, €8,000 for the Round 2 losers, and €5,000 for the Round 1 losers.

For the final standings, the prize money was €50,000 for 1st, €45,000 for 2nd, and so on down in steps of €5,000 to €10,000 for 9th, and also €10,000 for 10th. Prize money for players on equal Grand Prix points was shared.

== Players ==
22 players played in the Grand Prix. 20 qualified by rating (according to the average of the 12 monthly rating lists from February 2018 to January 2019, with ties broken according to the number of games played in that period), and one player was nominated per tournament by the organizer. World Chess nominated the same player, Daniil Dubov, for the first three tournaments, and he was therefore entitled to participate in the Grand Prix series ranking.

The list of rating qualifiers was released on 25 January 2019. Five players qualified but declined their invitations: Magnus Carlsen, Fabiano Caruana, Ding Liren, Vladimir Kramnik and Viswanathan Anand. Carlsen and Caruana had no need to play in the tournament (Carlsen as World Champion, and Caruana had already qualified for the Candidates Tournament); Ding Liren was virtually assured of qualifying due to being third in the rating list behind Carlsen and Caruana; while Kramnik had recently announced his retirement. This resulted in the first five reserves being invited.

The main list of 21 players (20 qualifying by rating, plus organizer nominee Dubov), and their schedule, was released on 19 February.

One more player was nominated for the Jerusalem tournament only, in coordination with the Israel Chess Federation. Boris Gelfand was nominated as the Jerusalem nominee. His result was not counted in the Grand Prix series ranking.

Teimour Radjabov and Levon Aronian withdrew from the last stage of the Grand Prix for medical reasons, and were replaced by Wang Hao and Dmitry Andreikin.

Invitee	Country	Qualifying method	Average rating	Played in tournaments
Shakhriyar Mamedyarov	Azerbaijan	rating (3)	2812$\tfrac16$	1,2,4
Maxime Vachier-Lagrave	France	rating (6)	2783$\tfrac56$	2,3,4
Anish Giri	Netherlands	rating (7)	2779$\tfrac34$	1,2,4
Wesley So	United States	rating (8)	2778$\tfrac{11}{12}$	1,2,4
Levon Aronian	Armenia	rating (9)	2773$\tfrac1{12}$	1,2
Alexander Grischuk	Russia	rating (11)	2767$\tfrac{11}{12}$	1,2,3
Hikaru Nakamura	United States	rating (12)	2767$\tfrac56$	1,2,3
Sergey Karjakin	Russia	rating (13)	2766$\tfrac1{12}$	1,2,4
Yu Yangyi	China	rating (14)	2761$\tfrac5{12}$	2,3,4
Ian Nepomniachtchi	Russia	rating (15)	2758	1,3,4
Peter Svidler	Russia	rating (16)	2751$\tfrac34$	1,2,3
Teimour Radjabov	Azerbaijan	rating (17)	2751$\tfrac34$	1,3
Veselin Topalov	Bulgaria	rating (18)	2744$\tfrac7{12}$	2,3,4
Dmitry Jakovenko	Russia	rating (19)	2739$\tfrac34$	1,3,4
David Navara	Czech Republic	rating (20)	2737$\tfrac12$	2,3,4
Radosław Wojtaszek	Poland	rating (1st reserve)	2734$\tfrac12$	1,3,4
Wei Yi	China	rating (2nd reserve)	2733$\tfrac{11}{12}$	1,3,4
Jan-Krzysztof Duda	Poland	rating (3rd reserve)	2733	1,2,3
Pentala Harikrishna	India	rating (4th reserve)	2732$\tfrac{11}{12}$	2,3,4
Nikita Vitiugov	Russia	rating (5th reserve)	2726$\tfrac{11}{12}$	1,2,3
Wang Hao	China	rating (10th reserve)	2715$\tfrac13$	4
Dmitry Andreikin	Russia	Organizer nominee	2711$\tfrac23$	4
Daniil Dubov	Russia	Organizer nominee	2698$\tfrac5{12}$	1,2,3
Boris Gelfand	Israel	Organizer nominee	2691$\tfrac13$	4

== Events results ==
=== Moscow, May 2019 ===
The first tournament was held in Moscow, Russia, from 17–29 May. Each round had a day each for the two regular games, and a third day for tie-breaks; and there was a rest day before the final round. Games began at 3.00 pm Moscow time (12.00 pm UTC).

At the start of the tournament, players were seeded according to their rating on the May 2019 ratings list. (Note: List) The top four seeds (Giri, Mamedyarov, Nepomniachtchi, and Grischuk) were placed into different quarters of the draw, and the remaining starting positions were decided by the drawing of lots at the opening ceremony on 16 May.

Results:

First round
1	Anish Giri (NED)	½
16	Daniil Dubov (RUS)	1½
7	Teimour Radjabov (AZE)	1½
6	Hikaru Nakamura (USA)	2½
13	Jan-Krzysztof Duda (POL)	1½
8	Wesley So (USA)	2½
9	Sergey Karjakin (RUS)	½
4	Alexander Grischuk (RUS)	1½
3	Ian Nepomniachtchi (RUS)	1½
5	Levon Aronian (ARM)	½
11	Wei Yi (CHN)	1½
15	Dmitry Jakovenko (RUS)	½
12	Nikita Vitiugov (RUS)	½
10	Peter Svidler (RUS)	1½
14	Radosław Wojtaszek (POL)	1½
2	Shakhriyar Mamedyarov (AZE)	½

Quarter-finals
16	Daniil Dubov (RUS)	1½
6	Hikaru Nakamura (USA)	2½
8	Wesley So (USA)	1½
4	Alexander Grischuk (RUS)	2½
3	Ian Nepomniachtchi (RUS)	2½
11	Wei Yi (CHN)	1½
10	Peter Svidler (RUS)	½
14	Radosław Wojtaszek (POL)	1½

Semi-finals
6	Hikaru Nakamura (USA)	½
4	Alexander Grischuk (RUS)	1½
3	Ian Nepomniachtchi (RUS)	3½
14	Radosław Wojtaszek (POL)	2½

Final
4	Alexander Grischuk (RUS)	1½
3	Ian Nepomniachtchi (RUS)	2½

=== Riga, July 2019 ===
2nd stage, Riga, Latvia, 12–24 July 2019

Results:

First round
1	Anish Giri (NED)	4
8	Sergey Karjakin (RUS)	5
12	Pentala Harikrishna (IND)	1½
5	Wesley So (USA)	2½
10	Peter Svidler (RUS)	1½
14	Jan-Krzysztof Duda (POL)	2½
16	Daniil Dubov (RUS)	½
4	Shakhriyar Mamedyarov (AZE)	1½
3	Alexander Grischuk (RUS)	3
15	Nikita Vitiugov (RUS)	1
11	Yu Yangyi (CHN)	4½*
6	Levon Aronian (ARM)	4½
7	Hikaru Nakamura (USA)	1½
9	Veselin Topalov (BUL)	2½
13	David Navara (CZE)	½
2	Maxime Vachier-Lagrave (FRA)	1½

Quarter-finals
8	Sergey Karjakin (RUS)	3½
5	Wesley So (USA)	4½
14	Jan-Krzysztof Duda (POL)	1½
4	Shakhriyar Mamedyarov (AZE)	2½
3	Alexander Grischuk (RUS)	2½
11	Yu Yangyi (CHN)	1½
9	Veselin Topalov (BUL)	½
2	Maxime Vachier-Lagrave (FRA)	1½

Semi-finals
5	Wesley So (USA)	½
4	Shakhriyar Mamedyarov (AZE)	1½
3	Alexander Grischuk (RUS)	½
2	Maxime Vachier-Lagrave (FRA)	1½

Final
4	Shakhriyar Mamedyarov (AZE)	5
2	Maxime Vachier-Lagrave (FRA)	4

* Yu Yangyi won the match against Aronian because he achieved a draw with the black pieces in the deciding Armageddon game.

=== Hamburg, November 2019 ===
The third tournament was played in Hamburg, Germany, from 5–17 November. Each round had three days of play: two for the regular time control matches, and one for tie breaks, if required. Round 1 was 5–7 November, round 2 was 8–10 November, round 3 was 11–13 November, 14 November was a rest day, and round 4 was 15–17 November.

Results:

First round
1	Maxime Vachier-Lagrave (FRA)	1½
12	Wei Yi (CHN)	½
8	Hikaru Nakamura (USA)	½
9	Veselin Topalov (BUL)	1½
14	David Navara (CZE)	3
6	Nikita Vitiugov (RUS)	1
11	Radosław Wojtaszek (POL)	1½
4	Alexander Grischuk (RUS)	2½
3	Teimour Radjabov (AZE)	3½
16	Daniil Dubov (RUS)	4½
13	Peter Svidler (RUS)	1½
10	Pentala Harikrishna (IND)	½
15	Dmitry Jakovenko (RUS)	1½
5	Yu Yangyi (CHN)	2½
7	Jan-Krzysztof Duda (POL)	1½
2	Ian Nepomniachtchi (RUS)	½

Quarter-finals
1	Maxime Vachier-Lagrave (FRA)	1½
9	Veselin Topalov (BUL)	½
14	David Navara (CZE)	½
4	Alexander Grischuk (RUS)	1½
16	Daniil Dubov (RUS)	3½
13	Peter Svidler (RUS)	2½
5	Yu Yangyi (CHN)	½
7	Jan-Krzysztof Duda (POL)	1½

Semi-finals
1	Maxime Vachier-Lagrave (FRA)	½
4	Alexander Grischuk (RUS)	1½
16	Daniil Dubov (RUS)	2½
7	Jan-Krzysztof Duda (POL)	3½

Final
4	Alexander Grischuk (RUS)	3½
7	Jan-Krzysztof Duda (POL)	2½

=== Jerusalem, December 2019 ===
4th stage, Jerusalem, Israel, 11–23 December 2019. On 30 November, 2019, FIDE announced that Teimour Radjabov and Levon Aronian would be replaced in the FIDE Grand Prix Jerusalem for medical reasons by Wang Hao and Dmitry Andreikin from the reserve list of Grand Prix participants.

Results:

First round
1	Maxime Vachier-Lagrave (FRA)	3
9	Veselin Topalov (BUL)	1
12	Dmitry Andreikin (RUS)	2½
10	Radosław Wojtaszek (POL)	1½
5	Wesley So (USA)	1½
8	Yu Yangyi (CHN)	½
16	Boris Gelfand (ISR)	1
4	Ian Nepomniachtchi (RUS)	3
3	Anish Giri (NED)	1½
11	Wei Yi (CHN)	2½
7	Sergey Karjakin (RUS)	4½*
13	Pentala Harikrishna (IND)	4½
6	Wang Hao (CHN)	3½
14	David Navara (CZE)	4½
15	Dmitry Jakovenko (RUS)	3½
2	Shakhriyar Mamedyarov (AZE)	2½

Quarter-finals
1	Maxime Vachier-Lagrave (FRA)	2½
12	Dmitry Andreikin (RUS)	1½
5	Wesley So (USA)	1½
4	Ian Nepomniachtchi (RUS)	2½
11	Wei Yi (CHN)	3½
7	Sergey Karjakin (RUS)	2½
14	David Navara (CZE)	1½
15	Dmitry Jakovenko (RUS)	½

Semi-finals
1	Maxime Vachier-Lagrave (FRA)	½
4	Ian Nepomniachtchi (RUS)	1½
11	Wei Yi (CHN)	2½
14	David Navara (CZE)	1½

Final
4	Ian Nepomniachtchi (RUS)	1½
11	Wei Yi (CHN)	½

* Karjakin advanced to the second round due to achieving a draw as black against Harikrishna in the Armageddon game.

== Grand Prix standings ==
The following table shows the overall Grand Prix standings. The top two players qualified for the Candidates Tournament.

	Player	Moscow	Riga	Hamburg	Jerusalem	Total GP points	TB1	TB2	TB3	Prize money
1	Alexander Grischuk (RUS)	7	3	10		20	1	1	12½	€98,000
2	Ian Nepomniachtchi (RUS)	9		0	10	19	2	0	10	€94,000
3	Maxime Vachier-Lagrave (FRA)		8	5	3	16	0	1	11½	€74,000
4	Shakhriyar Mamedyarov (AZE)	0	10		0	10	1	0	6½	€69,000
5	Jan-Krzysztof Duda (POL)	0	1	7		8	0	1	8	€57,000
6	Wei Yi (CHN)	2		0	5	7	0	1	6½	€52,000
7	Wesley So (USA)	1	3		2	6	0	0	7	€46,000
8 (tie)	Daniil Dubov (RUS)	2	0	3		5	0	0	6	€34,666.66
8 (tie)	Radosław Wojtaszek (POL)	5		0	0	5	0	0	6	€34,666.66
10	David Navara (CZE)		0	1	4	5	0	0	5½	€34,666.66
11	Peter Svidler (RUS)	2	0	2		4	0	0	5½	€21,000
12	Veselin Topalov (BUL)		1	2	0	3	0	0	4½	€21,000
13	Hikaru Nakamura (USA)	3	0	0		3	0	0	4	€20,000
14	Sergey Karjakin (RUS)	0	1		1	2	0	0	4½	€21,000
15	Yu Yangyi (CHN)		1	1	0	2	0	0	4	€21,000
16	Dmitry Jakovenko (RUS)	0		0	1	1	0	0	3	€18,000
17 (tie)	Anish Giri (NED)	0	0		0	0	0	0	2½	€15,000
17 (tie)	Nikita Vitiugov (RUS)	0	0	0		0	0	0	2½	€15,000
17 (tie)	Pentala Harikrishna (IND)		0	0	0	0	0	0	2½	€15,000
20	Teimour Radjabov (AZE)	0		0		0	0	0	2	€10,000
21	Levon Aronian (ARM)	0	0			0	0	0	1½	€10,000

Standings table legend
Players			Results		
Qualified for the Candidates; Tournament via Grand Prix	Qualified for the Candidates; Tournament by another path	Didn't qualify for Candidates via Grand Prix	Did not participate	Lost in the quarter-finals	Lost in the final
Qualified for the Candidates; Tournament via Grand Prix	Qualified for the Candidates; Tournament by another path	Didn't qualify for Candidates via Grand Prix	Lost in the first round	Lost in the semi-finals	Winner

Radjabov qualified for the Candidates by winning the Chess World Cup 2019. Giri and Vachier-Lagrave qualified because of their ratings. Initially it seemed that Vachier-Lagrave had lost his chance to qualify for the Candidates when Nepomniachtchi won the final Grand Prix tournament; but Vachier-Lagrave was first reserve and thus qualified when Radjabov withdrew.
