= Maxime Vachier-Lagrave =

French chess grandmaster (born 1990)

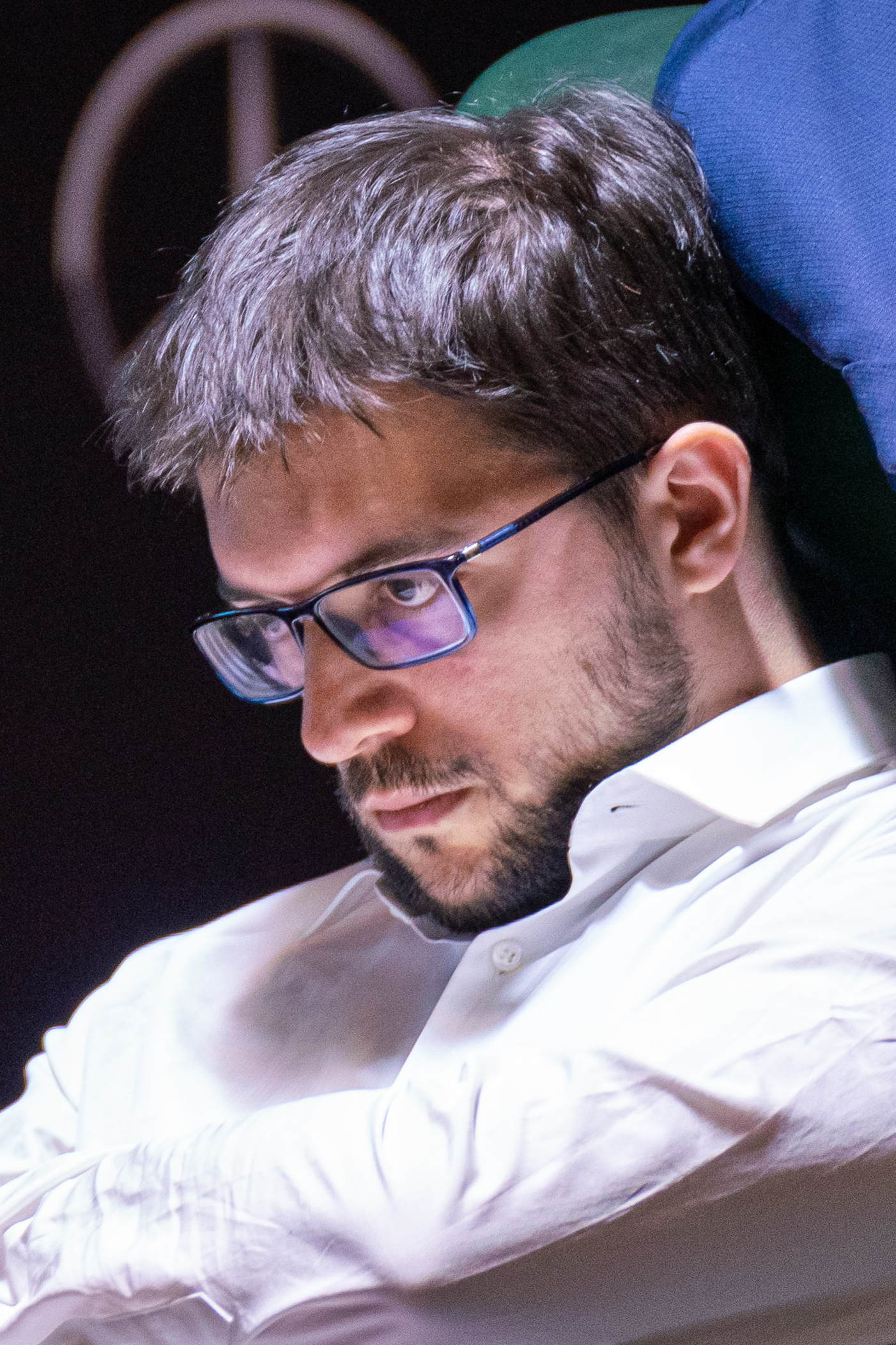
- Vachier-Lagrave in 2021

Personal information
- Born: 21 October 1990 (age 36) Nogent-sur-Marne, France

Chess career
- Country: France
- Title: Grandmaster (2005)
- FIDE rating: 2707 (November 2026)
- Peak rating: 2819 (August 2016)
- Ranking: No. 28 (November 2026)
- Peak ranking: No. 2 (August 2016)

Maxime Vachier-Lagrave (French pronunciation: [maksim vaʃje laɡʁav]; born 21 October 1990), often referred to by his initials, MVL, is a French chess grandmaster who is a former World Blitz Champion. With a peak rating of 2819, he is the seventh-highest rated player in history.

A chess prodigy, Vachier-Lagrave earned the title of grandmaster in 2005 at age 14. In 2007, he won the French Chess Championship, and in 2009, won the World Junior Chess Championship and the Biel Grandmaster Tournament. He repeated as French Chess Champion in 2011 and 2012 and as the winner of the Biel Grandmaster Tournament in 2013, 2014, 2015, and 2016. He won the Sinquefield Cup in 2017 and 2021 and competed in the Candidates Tournament 2020–21, placing second.

He has participated in the Chess Olympiad and in the European Team Chess Championship, representing France. He also represents French esports organization Team Vitality.

== Early life ==
From the age of six, Vachier-Lagrave competed in numerous sections of youth tournaments, winning the French Under-8 championship in 1997, U-10s in 1999, U-12s in 2000, U-16s in 2002, runner-up in the U-18s in 2003, and won the U-20s in 2004, scoring 8/9.

He also took part in the World Youth Chess Championship, coming third in the U-10 division in 2000 (8½/11), third in the U-12 championship in 2001 (8/11), second in the U-14 event in 2003 (9/11), and third in the U-16 section in 2005 (8½/11).

From 2001 to 2008, his FIDE rating increased steadily from 2198 in January 2001 to 2637 in January 2008. He passed 2600 in October 2007 and 2700 one year later.

He became an International Master in 2004 and achieved the Grandmaster title in 2005 at the age of 14 years and 4 months after sharing first in the 2004 Paris Championship with 6½/9, winning the NAO GM tournament in 2004 with 6/9 and coming second in the Évry GM tournament in February 2005 with 7½/9.

== Chess career ==
=== French Championships ===
- 2004: Winner of the French Junior Championship (U20).
- In 2005, Vachier-Lagrave finished in third place at the French Chess Championship with 7/11.
- Besançon 2006: finished 5th at the French Championship with 6 points out of 11 and a TPR of 2608.
- Winner of 2007 French Championship after beating GM Vladislav Tkachiev in tiebreak match. In the main tournament he collected 7.5 out of 11.
- Winner of the 2011 and 2012 French Championships.

=== Classical international tournaments ===
- 2006: Aeroflot Open, Moscow: played the A1 (main) tournament, reserved for players having a rating superior to 2550. He finished sixth with 6 points out of 9 and a TPR of 2775.

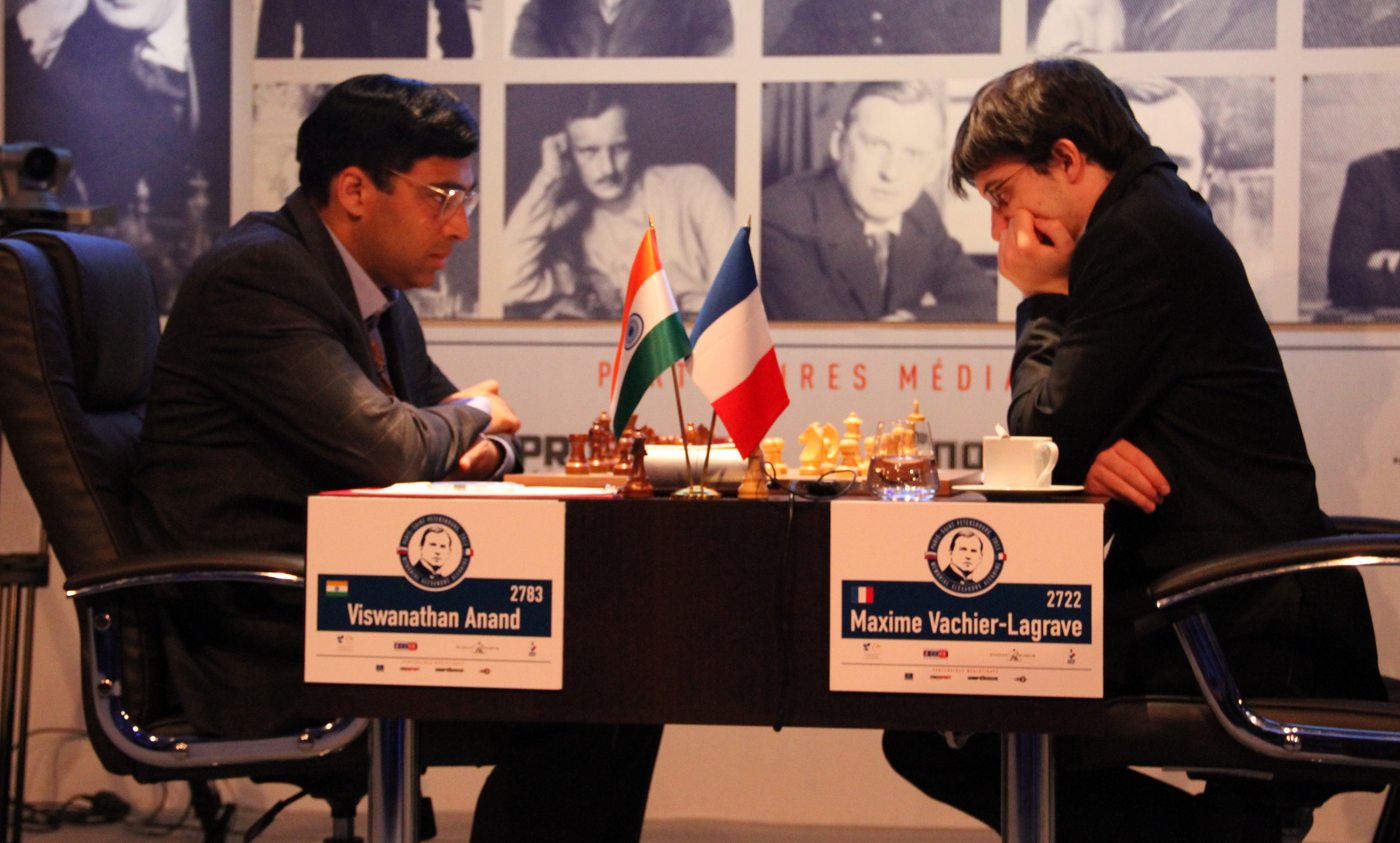
Vachier-Lagrave playing against Viswanathan Anand during the Alekhine Memorial in Paris, 2013

- Young Masters, Lausanne 2006: being the youngest player invited, won the tournament with a TPR of 2630.
- 2007: Corus tournament B, Wijk aan Zee: finished 5th with 8 points out of 13.
- Winner of the 2007 and 2008 Paris City Chess Championships with 7 points out of 9.
- 2008: 2nd-10th place at the European Individual Chess Championship with 8 points out of 13.
- Winner of the 2008 Gregory Marx Memorial in Paks, with 7 points out of 10.
- Winner of the 2009 Biel Grandmaster Tournament with 6 points out of 10 ahead of Morozevich and Ivanchuk.
- Winner of the 2009 World Junior Chess Championship.
- Winner of the 2010 Hoogeveen tournament.
- Winner of the 2012 SPICE Cup Festival at Webster University with 6 points out of 10 ahead of Lê Quang Liêm, Ding Liren, Wesley So, Georg Meier, and Csaba Balogh.
- 2012: 1st-2nd of the first Al Ain Classic, second on tie-break (number of wins).
- 2013: In the Alekhine Memorial tournament, held from 20 April to 1 May in Paris, Vachier-Lagrave finished eighth, with +2−2=5.
- Winner of the 2013 Biel Grandmaster Tournament (+3 -2 =5) after a tie-break against three players (Moiseenko, Bacrot and Ding Liren).
- Winner of the 2014 Biel Grandmaster Tournament with 6 points out of 10 ahead of Radosław Wojtaszek.
- 2014: Scored 4/10 (fourth place) in the Sinquefield Cup 2014 in Saint Louis, USA, the strongest chess tournament ever held in the history of chess.
- 2015: 2nd place in the Tata Steel Chess Tournament.
- Winner of the 2015 Biel Grandmaster Tournament with 6.5 points out of 10 ahead of Radosław Wojtaszek. 4th victory in Biel and 3rd consecutive victory.
- 2015: Fourth place at the 3rd Sinquefield Cup.
- 2015: Third place at the London Chess Classic.
- 2016: Second Place at the Gibraltar Chess Festival after a tie-break against Hikaru Nakamura.
- Winner of the 2016 Dortmund Sparkassen Chess Meeting with 5.5 points out of 7. Ahead of multiple-time previous winners Vladimir Kramnik and Fabiano Caruana.
- 2017: 2nd-3rd place at the Dortmund Sparkassen Chess Meeting.
- Winner of the 2017 Sinquefield Cup with 6 points out of 9 (+3=6).
- 2018: Second Place at the Gibraltar Chess Festival after a tie-break against Levon Aronian.
- 2018: Third place at the 5th Grenke Chess Classic with a score of 5/9 (+2–1=6).
- 2018: Eighth place at the sixth edition of Norway Chess, with a score of 3/8 (+0–2=6).
- Winner of the 2018 Shenzhen Masters on tiebreak, with a score of 5.5/10 (+1=9), defeating Ding Liren in their direct encounter (1.5-0.5).
- 2019: Fourth place at the 6th Grenke Chess Classic with a score of 5/9 (+2–1=6).
- Winner of the 2021 Sinquefield Cup with 6 points out of 9 (+4–1=4), being the first person to win clear first place twice and the first to win the event after losing one game.
- Runner Up Grenke Freestyle Chess Open 2026 scoring 7½/11, the same as winner Vincent Keymer but with worse tiebreaks.

=== FIDE Grand Prix and World Cups ===
- 2009: 9th-16th at the Chess World Cup 2009.
- 2013: Semifinalist at the Chess World Cup 2013.
- 2014–2015
  - 4th-7th place at the FIDE Grand Prix 2014–15 stage in Tashkent (November 2014).
  - Finished 15th (out of 16 participants) in the FIDE Grand Prix 2014–15, one of the qualifying methods of the 2016 World Chess Championship cycle.
- 2015: 5th-8th (quarterfinalist) at the Chess World Cup 2015.
- 2017:
  - Winner of the Sharjah Grand Prix (2017), with 5.5 points out of 9.
  - Finished sixth (out of 24 participants) in the FIDE Grand Prix 2017.
  - Semifinalist at the Chess World Cup 2017, after losing the armageddon tiebreak to Levon Aronian, thus narrowly missing qualification to the Candidates Tournament 2018.
- 2019:
  - Third place at the Chess World Cup 2019 in Khanty-Mansiysk.
  - Finished third (out of 21 participants) in the FIDE Grand Prix 2019.
    - Second place (finalist) at the FIDE Grand Prix 2019 stage in Riga.
    - Semifinalist at the FIDE Grand Prix 2019 stage in Hamburg.
    - Semifinalist at the FIDE Grand Prix 2019 stage in Jerusalem.
- 2021: 9th-16th at the Chess World Cup 2021.
- 2022:
  - Semifinalist at the FIDE Grand Prix 2022 stage in Belgrade.
  - Finished 10th (out of 25 participants) in the FIDE Grand Prix 2022, one of the qualifying methods of the 2023 World Chess Championship cycle.

=== Candidates Tournament 2020–2021 ===
On 6 March 2020, citing concerns over the COVID-19 pandemic, Teimour Radjabov withdrew from the 2020–21 Candidates Tournament. Vachier-Lagrave replaced Radjabov, as he was next on the qualifier by rating list. FIDE decided to postpone the second half of the tournament due to the coronavirus pandemic. The tournament was resumed on 19 April 2021, and ended on 28 April 2021.

Maxime ended the tournament with 8/14 points (4 wins, 8 draws, and 2 losses) getting second place, half a point behind the winner Ian Nepomniachtchi.

=== Grand Chess Tour tournaments ===
- 2015: Grand Chess Tour Participant
  - Norway Chess 2015: 4th–5th place
  - joint 2nd-5th place at the 2015 Sinquefield Cup
  - 1st-3rd Place at the London Chess Classic, came third on Sonneborn-Berger tie-break and after a tie-break match against Magnus Carlsen.
  - 4th Place in the 2015 Grand Chess Tour.
- 2016:
  - Third Place at the Paris Rapid and Blitz Grand Chess Tour Tournament with a score of 22/36
  - 7th Place in the 2016 Grand Chess Tour.
- 2017:
  - Second place at the Paris Grand Chess Tour (rapid and blitz), with a score of 24/36, after a tie-break with Magnus Carlsen
  - Winner of the 2017 Sinquefield Cup with 6 points out of 9 (+3=6), defeating Magnus Carlsen in their individual encounter.
  - Second place at the 2017 Grand Chess Tour, behind Magnus Carlsen.
- 2018:
  - Joint fifth through seventh place at the 2018 Sinquefield Cup, drawing all nine of his games.
  - Second place at the Saint-Louis Rapid and Blitz with a score of 21,5/36;
  - Second place at the London Chess Classic (beats Levon Aronian in the semi-final) 2018;
  - Second place at the 2018 Grand Chess Tour, behind Hikaru Nakamura.
- 2019:
  - Second place at Côte d'Ivoire Grand Chess Tour Rapid and Blitz tournament with a score of 23/36;
  - Winner of the 2019 Paris Rapid and Blitz Grand Chess Tour tournament with a score of 21/36;
  - Second-Fourth place in the Saint Louis Rapid and Blitz event with a score of 21.5/36. The second place was tied and shared with Ding Liren and Yu Yangyi;
  - Second place at the London Chess Classic 2019 (beats Magnus Carlsen in the semi-final);
  - Second place at the 2019 Grand Chess Tour, behind Ding Liren.
- 2021:
  - Third-fourth place in the 2021 Paris Rapid and Blitz Grand Chess Tour tournament;
  - Winner of the Croatia Grand Chess Tour Rapid and Blitz tournament with a score of 23/36;
  - Winner of the Sinquefield Cup with a score of 6 points out of 9 (+4=4-1);
  - Second place at the Grand Chess Tour 2021, behind Wesley So.
- 2022
  - Winner of the Bucharest Superbet classic after a tie-break against Wesley So and Levon Aronian;
  - Second-Third place Poland Grand Chess Tour Rapid and Blitz with a score of 22/36;
  - Third-Fourth place at the Saint-Louis Rapid and Blitz with a score of 19/36;
  - Third place at the Grand Chess Tour 2022, behind Alireza Firouzja and Wesley So.
- 2023
  - Joint fifth through seventh place at the Bucharest Superbet classic;
  - Third-Fourth place Poland Grand Chess Tour Rapid and Blitz with a score of 21.5/36;
  - Second place at the Saint-Louis Rapid and Blitz with a score of 20.5/36;
  - Joint fourth through six place at the Sinquefield Cup;
  - Second place at the Grand Chess Tour 2023, behind Fabiano Caruana.
- 2025
  - Second place at Superbet Rapid & Blitz Poland.
  - Tied 1-3 (2-3 After Blitz Tiebreaks) in Superbet Chess Classic Romania.
  - Third place at Saint Louis Rapid & Blitz.
  - Runner-up Grand Chess Tour 2025.
- 2026
  - tied 3-4 Super Rapid and Blitz Croatia.

=== Rapid, Blitz and Bullet tournaments and matches ===
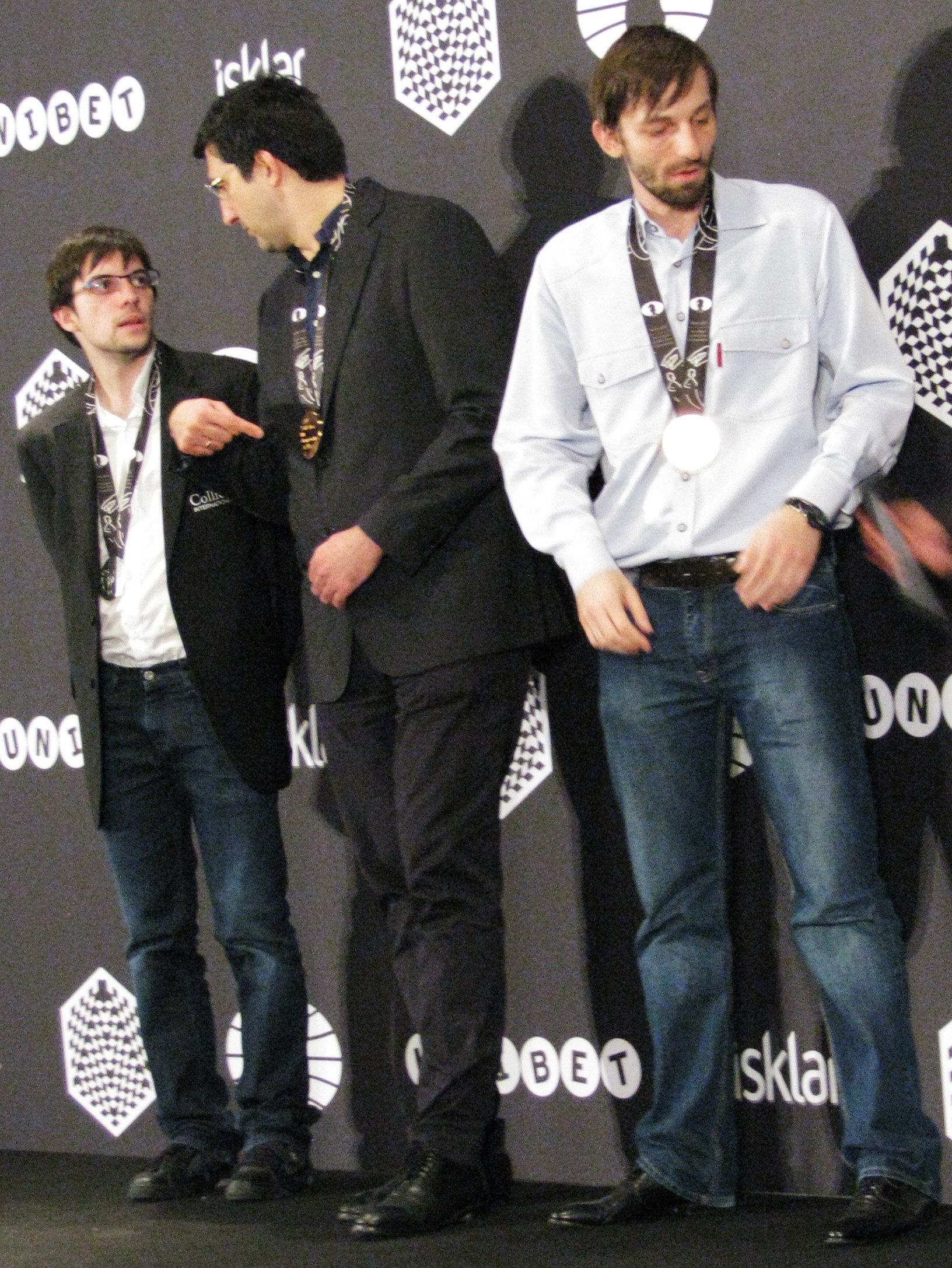
Vachier-Lagrave (left) chatting with Vladimir Kramnik at the World Blitz Chess Championship, 2015 in Berlin. (Alexander Grischuk is on the right).

- Winner of the 2010 Aeroflot Open Blitz Tournament
- Winner of the 2010 European Blitz Championship.
- Winner of the 2011 SportAccord World Mind Games in Beijing
- Winner of the 2011 Quenza Blitz Open Tournament
- Winner of the 2012 Port-Marly Rapid Pyramid Grand Prix
- Winner of the 2012 Biel Blitz Tournament
- Winner of the 2012 European Blitz Championship.
- Winner of the 2013 Paris International Blitz Tournament
- Winner of the 2013 Port-Marly Rapid Pyramids Grand Prix
- Winner of the 2014 Paris International Blitz Tournament
- Winner of the 2014 Paris International Rapid Tournament
- Winner of the 2014 Venaco Casanova Rapid Open
- Winner of the 2015 Norway Chess blitz tournament with 6.5 out of 9.
- Winner of the 2015 Quenza Blitz Open Tournament
- 2015: Second Place at the World Blitz Championship in Berlin with 15 points out of 21, only 0.5 point behind Alexander Grischuk.
- Winner of the 2016 Ciamannacce Blitz Open Tournament
- Winner of the 2016 Biel Masters Challenge Rapid match against Svidler
- Winner of the 2016 Corsica Masters (rapid), beat Anand in the final.
- 2016: Sixth Place at the World Blitz Championship in Doha with 14 points out of 21.
- 2019: Third place in Chess.com's Bullet Chess Championship, behind runner-up Oleksandr Bortnyk and Hikaru Nakamura, the winner.
- Winner of the 2019 Norway Chess blitz tournament with 7.5 out of 9.
- 2019: Fifth Place at the World Blitz Championship in Moscow with 14 points out of 21.
- Winner of the 2021 World Blitz Championship in Warsaw with 15 points out of 21.
- Winner of the 2023 Tata Steel India Chess Tournament, Rapid section.
- Winner of the Champions Chess Tour 2023 AI Cup Rapid.
- 2023: Sixth Place at the World Rapid Championship in Samarkand with 9 points out of 13.
- 2023: Fourth Place at the World Blitz Championship in Samarkand with 14.5 points out of 21.
- In November, Vachier-Lagrave participated in the Total Chess World Championship 2026. He scored 6.5/9 (+5-1=3) in the Blitz Swiss, which served as a tiebreaker for the group stage. Vachier-Lagrave won Group D with 17 points and qualified to the top knockout bracket. He lost to Anish Giri and Fabiano Caruana in their matches, leading to a 4th place finish.

=== Teams ===
Vachier-Lagrave has played in the French team championship with the NAO Chess Club teams since 1997. Team results include:

- U16 French championship 2004–2005: first board for NAO Chess Club, 7 points from 7 games. NAO-CC earned the title
- U16 French championship 2005–2006: first board for NAO Chess Club, 7 points from 7 games. NAO-CC again earned the title
- Top 16 2006: NAO team, 6½ points from 8 games. NAO-CC won the championship for the fourth time in a row (2003 to 2006)

He played for the Évry Grand Roque chess club in 2008, 2009, and 2010. Since 2011, he has played for the Clichy club chess team in the Top12.

In the European Chess Club Cup, he played with SV Mülheim Nord (in 2008), SOCAR Baku (in 2010), Clichy Échecs 92 (in 2013) and Obiettivo Risarcimento Padova (2014–2016).

In February 2025, Vachier-Lagrave signed to French esports organization Team Vitality, joining as the first chess player in the organization's history.

=== Rapid and blitz rankings ===
In addition to his strength in classical time controls, Vachier-Lagrave is very skilled at rapid and blitz chess. He won the World Blitz Chess Championship 2021, and was the only player to defeat eventual winner Magnus Carlsen during the 2023 edition. As of January 2024, Maxime ranked third on the FIDE rapid list and tenth on the blitz list.

== Tournament and match results (2003–2009) ==
Legend
Classical international and national individual and team tournaments
Tournaments organized by FIDE (Olympiads, World Championships, World Cups, FIDE Grand Swiss and Candidates tournaments)
Non classical (rapid and blitz) rated and blindfold competitions (Grand Chess Tour, Amber and Lindores Abbey tournaments, Champions Showdown matches)
Internet competitions (Internet Chess Club, Chess.com, chess24.com, Lichess, Champions Chess Tour and FIDE online tournaments and matches)

TPR (Tournament Performance ratings) of FIDE-rated events calculated according to FIDE.

Year	City	Tournament	Time control	Wins	Losses	Draws	Points	Place	TPR
2003	Kallithea	World Youth Chess Championship 2003 - Boys U14	Classical	8	1	2	9/11	2nd	2537
2004	Hersonissos	World Youth Chess Championships 2004 - Boys U16	Classical	4	1	6	7/11	13th	2450
2005	Belfort	World Youth Chess Championships 2005 - Boys U16	Classical	7	1	3	8½/11	3rd	2531
2006	Turin	37th Chess Olympiad, Open event, France Board 5	Classical	3	1	6	6/10	7th (Team)	2563
2007	Heraklion	16th European Team Chess Championship, Open section, France Board 4	Classical	3	1	4	5/8	9th (Team)	2661
2008		9th European Individual Chess Championship 2008	Classical	6	1	4	8/11	8th	2750
2008		Sixth Marx György Memorial	Classical	4	0	6	7/10	First	2763
2008		24th European Chess Club Cup, Open section	Classical	1	1	5	3½/7		2586
2008		38th Chess Olympiad, Open event, France Board 2	Classical	3	1	7	6½/11	22nd (Team)	2666
2009		Gibraltar Master 2009	Classical	4	1	5	6½/10	15th	
2009		Bundesliga, SV Mülheim-Nord Board 3 (9 games)	Classical	4	1	4	6/9	5th (Team)	2711
2009		G. P. Donostia Capital Cultural Europea 2016	Classical	3	3	3	4½/9	7th	2680
2009	Biel/Bienne	GM Tournament	Classical	2	0	8	6/10	First	
2009	Nîmes	Championnat de France - National A	Classical	5	0	6	8/11	2nd	
Year	City	Tournament	Time control	Wins	Losses	Draws	Points	Place	TPR

== Personal life ==
Vachier-Lagrave also teaches chess on his personal YouTube channel, MVL Chess, and maintains a blog.

Vachier-Lagrave also has a bachelor's degree in mathematics.
