= World Chess Championship 2012 =

Chess match between Viswanathan Anand and Boris Gelfand

- Tretyakov Gallery, Moscow, Russia
- 11–30 May 2012
	Defending champion	Challenger
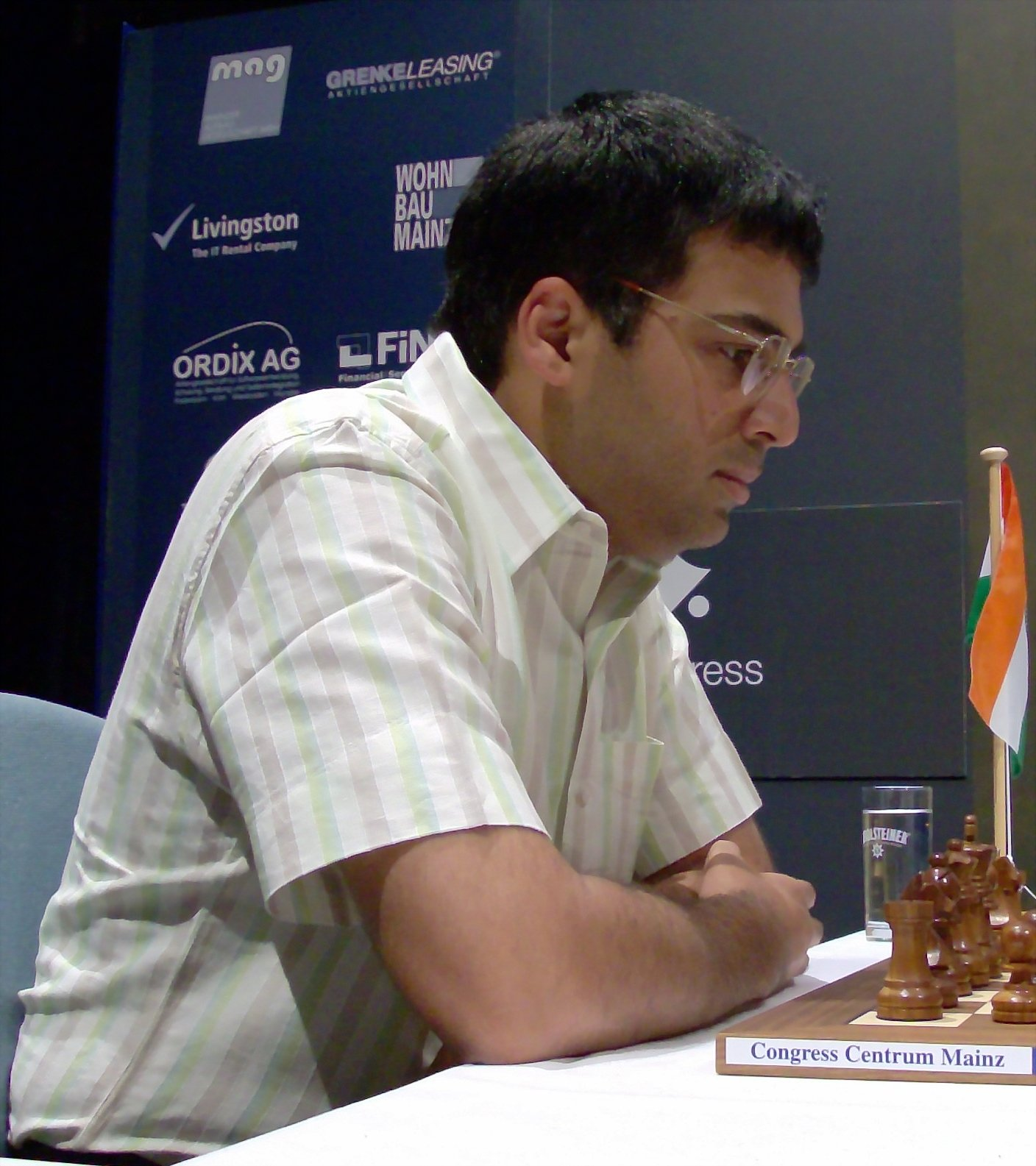
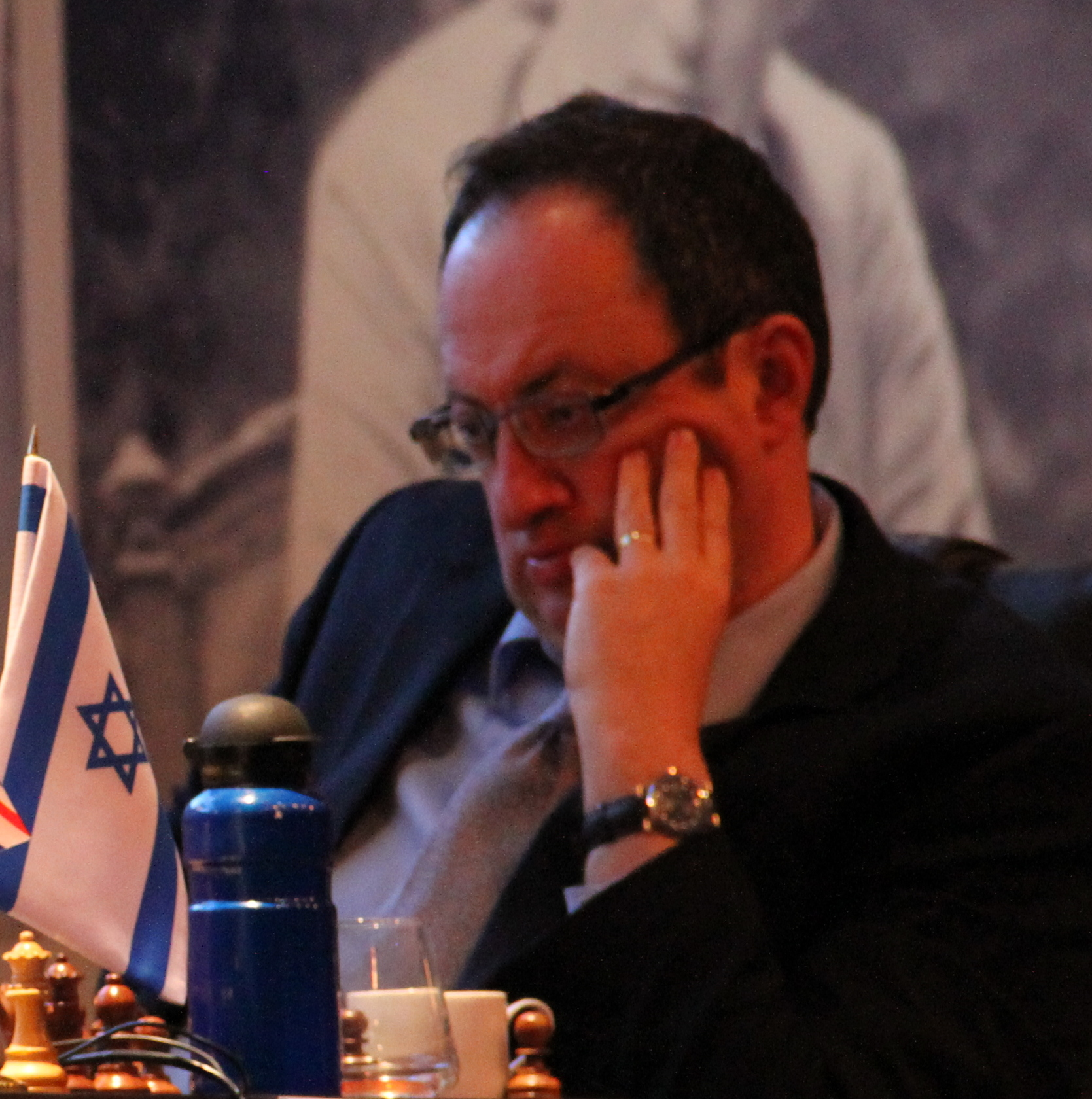
	Viswanathan Anand	Boris Gelfand
	(India) Viswanathan Anand	(Israel) Boris Gelfand
6 (2½)	Scores	6 (1½)
	Born 11 December 1969; 42 years old	Born 24 June 1968; 43 years old
	Winner of the World Chess Championship 2010	Winner of the Candidates Tournament 2011
	Rating: 2791 (World No. 4)	Rating: 2727 (World No. 20)

The World Chess Championship 2012 was a chess match between the defending World Champion Viswanathan Anand of India and Boris Gelfand of Israel, winner of the 2011 Candidates Tournament. After sixteen games, including four rapid games, Anand retained his title. The match, held under the auspices of the World Chess Federation FIDE, took place between 10 and 31 May 2012 in the Engineering Building of the State Tretyakov Gallery, Moscow, Russia. The prize fund was US$2.55 million.

Anand was the defending champion, having gained the title in 2007 and defended it in 2008 (against Vladimir Kramnik) and in 2010 (against Veselin Topalov). Boris Gelfand became the challenger after winning the eight-player Candidates Tournament in May 2011. Anand's subsequent victory, therefore, was his third consecutive title defence.

The match conditions called for twelve games to be played with classical time control. If a player scored at least 6½ points, he would be declared the winner and the match ended. By the end of the twelve games, however, the match was tied at 6 points each, so four rapid games were played in order to produce a result. Anand won the rapid-game playoff with a win in the second game and draws in the other three games.

== Candidates tournament ==
The process for selecting the challenger underwent a number of changes. A major change was announced on 25 November 2008, when it was announced that a two-player Challenger Match would be replaced with an eight-player Candidates Tournament. The change was criticised by a number of players and commentators, as well as by the Association of Chess Professionals. In June 2009, FIDE indicated that the format would be in the form of matches.

Originally, the intended venue for the candidate matches was Baku, but Levon Aronian announced that he would not play in Azerbaijan and matches involving him were to be held in a different country. The venue was changed to Kazan, Russia in July 2010. The Azerbaijani nominee Shakhriyar Mamedyarov still remained in the tournament despite the tournament not being held in Azerbaijan.

In November 2010, then world No. 2 Magnus Carlsen withdrew from the Candidates Tournament citing the selection process as not sufficiently modern and fair. He was replaced by Alexander Grischuk.

Seed	Place	Qualifier	Age	Jan 2010 Rating	Jan 2010 World Rank	May 2011 World Rank
1	Runner up of the World Chess Championship 2010 match	Veselin Topalov (Bulgaria)	36	2805	2	7
n/a	The next highest rated player in the world (average of July 2009 and January 2010 ratings)	Magnus Carlsen (Norway) (withdrew)	20	2810	1	2
2	The second-next highest rated player in the world (average of July 2009 and January 2010 ratings)	Vladimir Kramnik (Russia)	35	2788	4	4
3	Winner of the FIDE Grand Prix 2008–2010	Levon Aronian (Armenia)	28	2781	5	3
4	Winner of the Chess World Cup 2009	Boris Gelfand (Israel)	42	2761	6	16
5	Tournament organisers' nominee	Shakhriyar Mamedyarov (Azerbaijan)	26	2741	11	9
6	Third place at the FIDE Grand Prix 2008–2010	Alexander Grischuk (Russia) (replacement for Carlsen)	27	2736	15	12
7	Runner-up at the FIDE Grand Prix 2008–2010	Teimour Radjabov (Azerbaijan)	24	2733	16	13
8	Runner up of the 2009 Challenger Match	Gata Kamsky (United States)	36	2693	40	18

=== Pairings and schedule ===
According to FIDE, the loser of the World Chess Championship 2010 (Veselin Topalov) was seeded no. 1 and the rest were seeded according to FIDE rating as of January 2010. FIDE confirmed the matches on 7 February 2011. Games of the matches were played in Kazan, Russia, from 5 to 25 May 2011. Tiebreaks were conducted using game in 25 minutes rapid play followed by blitz play and then armageddon games as necessary.

The schedule of the event was as follows:

- 5 May – Game 1, round 1
- 6 May – Game 2, round 1
- 7 May – Game 3, round 1
- 8 May – Game 4, round 1
- 9 May – Tiebreaks

- 12 May – Game 1, round 2
- 13 May – Game 2, round 2
- 14 May – Game 3, round 2
- 15 May – Game 4, round 2
- 16 May – Tiebreaks

- 19 May – Game 1, round 3
- 20 May – Game 2, round 3
- 21 May – Game 3, round 3
- 22 May – Free Day
- 23 May – Game 4, round 3
- 24 May – Game 5, round 3
- 25 May – Game 6, round 3
- 26 May – Tiebreaks / Closing Ceremony

=== Bracket ===
Tiebreaks are in italics where needed.

Quarterfinals (best of 4)
1	(Bulgaria) Veselin Topalov	½	0	½	½	1½
8	(United States) Gata Kamsky	½	1	½	½	2½
4	(Israel) Boris Gelfand	½	½	1	½	2½
5	(Azerbaijan) Shakhriyar Mamedyarov	½	½	0	½	1½
2	(Russia) Vladimir Kramnik	½	½	½	½	4½	6½
7	(Azerbaijan) Teimour Radjabov	½	½	½	½	3½	5½
3	(Armenia) Levon Aronian	½	½	½	½	1½	3½
6	(Russia) Alexander Grischuk	½	½	½	½	2½	4½

Semifinals (best of 4)
8	(United States) Gata Kamsky	½	½	½	½	2	4
4	(Israel) Boris Gelfand	½	½	½	½	4	6
2	(Russia) Vladimir Kramnik	½	½	½	½	2½	4½
6	(Russia) Alexander Grischuk	½	½	½	½	3½	5½

Final (best of 6)
4	(Israel) Boris Gelfand	½	½	½	½	½	1	3½
6	(Russia) Alexander Grischuk	½	½	½	½	½	0	2½

== Championship match ==
The Championship match between Viswanathan Anand and Boris Gelfand was held from 10 to 30 May 2012 in Moscow, Russia, under the auspices of FIDE.

=== Host selection ===
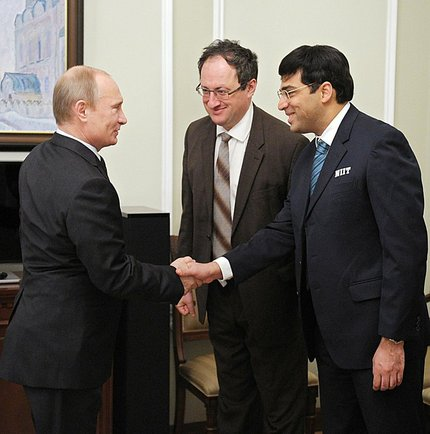
Russian president Vladimir Putin meets Anand and Gelfand after the competition.

The executive board gave during its congress in fall 2009 in Halkidiki an option to London, United Kingdom to organise the World Chess Championship for 2012. They had until 15 February 2010 to exercise the option which had to include the offer of a prize fund similar to that for the World Chess Championship 2010 match. The London Chess Classic organising body "Chess Promotions Limited" confirmed that London were in negotiations to hold the World Chess Championships in 2012. However, after FIDE failed to agree to the terms of the contract within the time frame agreed upon, the option expired on 28 January 2011, and Chess Promotions Limited withdrew their bid to organise the event in London, citing the lack of time left to successfully organise the event.

As a result, FIDE opened an application procedure for the hosting of the World Chess Championship match to be played from 10 April 2012 to 31 May 2012. Organisations interested in bidding to host the event had until 31 July 2011, 13:00 GMT to submit their documents including a bid fee.

On 28 June 2011, it was announced that Moscow had submitted a bid to host the 2012 World Chess Championship.

On 13 July 2011, the Tamil Nadu state government announced a bid of Rs 20 crore (Approx. $4.5 million) for the match to be held in Chennai, India. Chennai is the home city of the world champion Viswanathan Anand. It was reported on 14 July 2011, that Minsk, Belarus was also interested in hosting this event.

In an interview with the Russian newspaper "Kommersant", dated 29 July 2011, Boris Gelfand expressed his concern about the offer made by Chennai. Gelfand said the offer from Moscow was the only transparent one; he was not sure of the existence of financial guarantees by the Indian side. The Chennai offer was in the Tamil language and he claimed it had not been translated into English. In the past, matches, including those of Kasparov against Ponomaryov and against Kasimdzanov, were cancelled due to lack of financial guarantees.

On 2 August 2011, FIDE announced that it received bids from the Russian chess federation (Moscow) and a second one from the All India chess federation (Chennai). Both were well above the minimum required prize fund. FIDE announced they would contact the bidders and players, and declare the winner of the bid by 10 August 2011.

Kirsan Ilyumzhinov, FIDE's president, told the Russian newspaper "Sport Express" that the financial offer was not the only criterion. Other factors, including the possibility of the propagation of the "chess in school" programme, and popularisation of chess in a particular region will also be considered. He would also take into account the views of the champion and the challenger.

On 8 August 2011, FIDE announced that the Russian Chess Federation had won the bid and would host the match in Moscow in May 2012. The prize fund will be 2.55 million US dollars. Skolkovo, the Innovation project near Moscow, was named as a possible venue.

On 20 February 2012, an agreement between the Russian Chess Federation and the Tretyakov Gallery was signed to stage there the World Championship Match. Andrey Filatov, the sponsor of the match, believes that bringing chess and art together can open a new page in chess history.

=== Match conditions ===
The match format was the best of 12 games. Players scored one point for a win and half a point for a draw. The match ended once either player scored a minimum of 6½ points. Time control was 120 minutes, with 60 minutes added after move 40, 15 minutes added after move 60, and 30 additional seconds per move starting from move 61.

In case of a tie at the end of 12 games, there would be a series of tie breaks:

1. Colors would be drawn and four rapid games would be played. The time control for these games would be 25 minutes plus 10 seconds per move.
2. If the score was tied after the four rapid tie break games, colors would be drawn and two blitz games (5 minutes plus 10 seconds increment per move) would be played. If the score was tied after two blitz games, another two-game blitz match would be played, under the same terms. The process would repeat, if necessary, until five blitz matches have been played.
3. If the score was tied after ten blitz games, a single sudden-death "Armageddon game" would determine the champion. The winner of a draw of lots would get to choose the colour to play, with white given 5 minutes and Black 4 minutes. Beginning with move 61, a three-second increment would be added following each move. If the game was drawn, then the player of the Black pieces would be declared champion.

=== Seconds ===
Anand had the same group of seconds who helped his preparation in World Chess Championship 2008 and World Chess Championship 2010: Peter Heine Nielsen, Rustam Kasimdzhanov, Surya Shekhar Ganguly and Radosław Wojtaszek.

Gelfand's seconds for the match included Alexander Huzman, Pavel Eljanov, and Maxim Rodshtein.

In a post-game press conference, Gelfand confirmed the media speculation that he had additional seconds, who were not revealed. After the match Gelfand revealed that the other seconds were Evgeny Tomashevsky and Michael Roiz. Gelfand also said that Garry Kasparov had offered to be his second for the match and help in preparation but Gelfand refused, saying "I was really shocked. ... For me it was unthinkable to receive help from somebody who has access to secrets of my colleagues."

=== Previous head-to-head record ===
Before the 2012 match Anand and Gelfand played 35 games against each other at classical time control, with Anand winning 6 games and Gelfand winning 5 games. Gelfand had scored his last win in 1993.

Head-to-head record
		Anand wins	Draws	Gelfand wins	Total
Classical	Anand (white) – Gelfand (black)	5	10	0	15
Classical	Gelfand (white) – Anand (black)	1	14	5	20
Classical	Total	6	24	5	35
Rapid chess		8	19	1	28
Blitz chess		3	4	0	7
Total		17	47	6	70

=== Schedule and results ===
Regular schedule

Game	Day, Date	Anand	Gelfand	Standing
1	Friday, 11 May	½	½	Match tied ½ – ½
2	Saturday, 12 May	½	½	Match tied 1 – 1
3	Monday, 14 May	½	½	Match tied 1½ – 1½
4	Tuesday, 15 May	½	½	Match tied 2 – 2
5	Thursday, 17 May	½	½	Match tied 2½ – 2½
6	Friday, 18 May	½	½	Match tied 3 – 3
7	Sunday, 20 May	0	1	Gelfand leads 4 – 3
8	Monday, 21 May	1	0	Match tied 4 – 4
9	Wednesday, 23 May	½	½	Match tied 4½ – 4½
10	Thursday, 24 May	½	½	Match tied 5 – 5
11	Saturday, 26 May	½	½	Match tied 5½ – 5½
12	Monday, 28 May	½	½	Match tied 6 – 6
Tie break	Wednesday, 30 May	2½	1½	Anand wins 8½ – 7½

Games 1–12 were scheduled to begin at 15:00 local time.

Tie-break schedule

Game	Format	Anand	Gelfand	Standing
13	Rapid^{1}	½	½	Tie break even ½ – ½
14	Rapid^{1}	1	0	Anand leading 1½ – ½
15	Rapid^{1}	½	½	Anand leading 2 – 1
16	Rapid^{1}	½	½	Anand wins 2½ – 1½

^1 Time control for rapid games: 25 minutes plus 10 seconds per move.

All tie-break games were scheduled to be played on Wednesday, 30 May, with Game 13 scheduled to begin at 12:00 local time.

=== Classical games ===
==== Game 1, Anand–Gelfand, ½–½ ====
Position after 14...Ra7

Position: c8 black bishop, e8 black king, h8 black rook, a7 black rook, e7 black pawn, f7 black pawn, g7 black bishop, h7 black pawn, a6 black pawn, c6 black pawn, d6 white pawn, g6 black pawn, a5 black queen, c5 black pawn, e4 white pawn, c3 white pawn, f3 white knight, b2 white rook, f2 white pawn, g2 white pawn, h2 white pawn, c1 white bishop, d1 white queen, f1 white rook, g1 white king

Game 1: In this position, Anand played 15.Bg5, allowing Gelfand to equalize the position. Better was 15.Bf4, which puts additional pressure on Black and creates some theoretical chances to play for a win.

Grünfeld Defence, D85

1.d4 Nf6 2.c4 g6 3.Nc3 d5 4.cxd5 Nxd5 5.e4 Nxc3 6.bxc3 Bg7 7.Nf3 c5 8.Bb5+ Nc6 9.d5 Qa5 10.Rb1 a6 11.Bxc6+ bxc6 12.0-0 Qxa2 13.Rb2 Qa5 14.d6 Ra7 15.Bg5 exd6 16.Qxd6 Rd7 17.Qxc6 Qc7 18.Qxc7 Rxc7 19.Bf4 Rb7 20.Rc2 0-0 21.Bd6 Re8 22.Nd2 f5 23.f3 fxe4 24.Nxe4 Bf5 ½–½
A draw by mutual agreement.

==== Game 2, Gelfand–Anand, ½–½ ====
Gelfand started his first game with White in the match by playing 1.d4 and the game went on to the Slav Defence. The position in the game followed the game played between Kasparov and Gelfand in Linares in 1991 where Gelfand lost, but in this game the challenger opted for a different line. Anand played several accurate moves to set up a good position for neutralising White's active pieces. After 19 moves were played Gelfand decided to exchange his knight for a bishop by 20.Nxf5 to avoid a presence of opposite coloured bishops, but the position afterwards appeared to be with no weaknesses and a well placed knight for Black. The game saw no progress on both sides and Gelfand offered a draw. At the press-conference he described the line he chose as "a slight symbolic edge".

Semi-Slav Defence, D45

1.d4 d5 2.c4 c6 3.Nc3 Nf6 4.e3 e6 5.Nf3 a6 6.b3 Bb4 7.Bd2 Nbd7 8.Bd3 0-0 9.0-0 Bd6 10.Rc1 e5 11.cxd5 cxd5 12.e4 dxe4 13.Nxe4 Nxe4 14.Bxe4 Nf6 15.dxe5 Nxe4 16.exd6 Qxd6 17.Be3 Bf5 18.Qxd6 Nxd6 19.Nd4 Rfe8 20.Nxf5 Nxf5 21.Bc5 h5 22.Rfd1 Rac8 23.Kf1 f6 24.Bb4 Kh7 25.Rc5 ½–½
A draw by mutual agreement.

==== Game 3, Anand–Gelfand, ½–½ ====
Position after 23 d6

Position: c8 black rook, a7 black pawn, b7 black pawn, d7 black bishop, g7 black king, h7 black pawn, d6 white pawn, g6 black pawn, f5 black rook, a4 black knight, f3 white pawn, a2 white pawn, b2 white pawn, d2 white rook, e2 white knight, g2 white pawn, a1 white king, f1 white bishop, h1 white rook

Game 3: In this position, Gelfand played 23...Rfc5?! instead of simpler 23...Nb6 followed by Rd5 and Rc6 to round up the d6-pawn.

The game opened with a Grünfeld Defence (as in the game 1), but Anand deviated very early by playing 3.f3 instead of 3.Nc3. Following the opening moves White gained an edge and was pawn up, but Anand ran into time trouble, having to play 7 moves per minute to reach the time control at move 40 and having missed the winning continuation in the double-rook ending.

At move 20 White chose to capture correctly with 20.Nxf6, rather than 20.Rxd2 after which the continuation 20...Nxe4 21.fxe4 Bxd4 22.Rxd4 Rf2 23.e5 Bb5 gives Black strong counterplay. In the next moves the game continued with 20...Rxf6! 21.Rxd2 Rf5 22.Bxg7 Kxg7 23.d6 (see diagram) and then 23 ...Rfc5?!. At the press-conference Gelfand said: "I understood the position was dangerous. I underestimated a few moves. I thought that 23...Rfc5 could win back the pawn, but I underestimated 24.Rd1 and here I had to fight for the draw. I was quite on edge for some time during the game." The game was drawn after 37 moves, as White could not find a line to play for a win. After the game Anand concisely said: "I came closer today."

Grünfeld Defence, D70

1.d4 Nf6 2.c4 g6 3.f3 d5 4.cxd5 Nxd5 5.e4 Nb6 6.Nc3 Bg7 7.Be3 0-0 8.Qd2 e5 9.d5 c6 10.h4 cxd5 11.exd5 N8d7 12.h5 Nf6 13.hxg6 fxg6 14.0-0-0 Bd7 15.Kb1 Rc8 16.Ka1 e4 17.Bd4 Na4 18.Nge2 Qa5 19.Nxe4 Qxd2 20.Nxf6+ Rxf6 21.Rxd2 Rf5 22.Bxg7 Kxg7 23.d6 Rfc5 24.Rd1 a5 25.Rh4 Rc2 26.b3 Nb2 27.Rb1 Nd3 28.Nd4 Rd2 29.Bxd3 Rxd3 30.Re1 Rd2 31.Kb1 Bf5+ 32.Nxf5+ gxf5 33.Re7+ Kg6 34.Rc7 Re8 35.Rh1 Ree2 36.d7 Rb2+ 37.Kc1 Rxa2 ½–½
A draw by mutual agreement

==== Game 4, Gelfand–Anand, ½–½ ====
Semi-Slav Defence, D45

1.d4 d5 2.c4 c6 3.Nc3 Nf6 4.e3 e6 5.Nf3 a6 6.b3 Bb4 7.Bd2 Nbd7 8.Bd3 0-0 9.0-0 Bd6 10.Qc2 e5 11.cxd5 cxd5 12.e4 exd4 13.Nxd5 Nxd5 14.exd5 Nf6 15.h3 Bd7 16.Rad1 Re8 17.Nxd4 Rc8 18.Qb1 h6 19.Nf5 Bxf5 20.Bxf5 Rc5 21.Rfe1 Rxd5 22.Bc3 Rxe1+ 23.Rxe1 Bc5 24.Qc2 Bd4 25.Bxd4 Rxd4 26.Qc8 g6 27.Bg4 h5 28.Qxd8+ Rxd8 29.Bf3 b6 30.Rc1 Rd6 31.Kf1 a5 32.Ke2 Nd5 33.g3 Ne7 34.Be4 Kg7 ½–½
A draw by mutual agreement.

==== Game 5, Anand–Gelfand, ½–½ ====
Anand started the game by switching the opening move to 1.e4 perhaps to sharpen the play, but Gelfand continued with the Sicilian Sveshnikov instead of the Sicilian Najdorf or Petroff Defence and the resulting position left the World Champion unprepared. The game reached a standard position after the theoretical moves in the opening, with a bind in the centre for White and a backward d6 pawn and weak d6 square for Black that is compensated with his activity. In the next moves Gelfand successfully equalised the position and left his opponent with minor chances. The game ended in a draw after 27 moves were played.

Sicilian Defence, Sveshnikov Variation, B33

1.e4 c5 2.Nf3 Nc6 3.d4 cxd4 4.Nxd4 Nf6 5.Nc3 e5 6.Ndb5 d6 7.Bg5 a6 8.Na3 b5 9.Nd5 Be7 10.Bxf6 Bxf6 11.c4 b4 12.Nc2 0-0 13.g3 a5 14.Bg2 Bg5 15.0-0 Be6 16.Qd3 Bxd5 17.cxd5 Nb8 18.a3 Na6 19.axb4 Nxb4 20.Nxb4 axb4 21.h4 Bh6 22.Bh3 Qb6 23.Bd7 b3 24.Bc6 Ra2 25.Rxa2 bxa2 26.Qa3 Rb8 27.Qxa2 ½–½
A draw by mutual agreement.

==== Game 6, Gelfand–Anand, ½–½ ====
Semi-Slav Defence, D45

1.d4 d5 2.c4 c6 3.Nc3 Nf6 4.e3 e6 5.Nf3 a6 6.Qc2 c5 7.cxd5 exd5 8.Be2 Be6 9.0-0 Nc6 10.Rd1 cxd4 11.Nxd4 Nxd4 12.Rxd4 Bc5 13.Rd1 Qe7 14.Bf3 0-0 15.Nxd5 Bxd5 16.Bxd5 Nxd5 17.Rxd5 Rac8 18.Bd2 Bxe3 19.Bc3 Bb6 20.Qf5 Qe6 21.Qf3 f6 22.h4 Qc6 23.h5 Rfd8 24.Rxd8+ Rxd8 25.Qxc6 bxc6 26.Re1 Kf7 27.g4 Bd4 28.Rc1 Bxc3 29.Rxc3 Rd4 ½–½
A draw by mutual agreement.

==== Game 7, Gelfand–Anand, 1–0 ====
Gelfand scored the first win of the match. Commentators considered 23...g5? to be the critical mistake, allowing Gelfand to get a winning position with 24.Qc7 Qxc7 25.Rxc7. Anand sacrificed his bishop for counterplay but it was not enough. In the final position, Black can queen his pawn but cannot stop the threat of Ng6+ followed by Rg7 mate.

Semi-Slav Defence, D45

1.d4 d5 2.c4 c6 3.Nc3 Nf6 4.e3 e6 5.Nf3 a6 6.c5 Nbd7 7.Qc2 b6 8.cxb6 Nxb6 9.Bd2 c5 10.Rc1 cxd4 11.exd4 Bd6 12.Bg5 0-0 13.Bd3 h6 14.Bh4 Bb7 15.0-0 Qb8 16.Bg3 Rc8 17.Qe2 Bxg3 18.hxg3 Qd6 19.Rc2 Nbd7 20.Rfc1 Rab8 21.Na4 Ne4 22.Rxc8+ Bxc8 23.Qc2 g5 24.Qc7 Qxc7 25.Rxc7 f6 26.Bxe4 dxe4 27.Nd2 f5 28.Nc4 Nf6 29.Nc5 Nd5 30.Ra7 Nb4 31.Ne5 Nc2 32.Nc6 Rxb2 33.Rc7 Rb1+ 34.Kh2 e3 35.Rxc8+ Kh7 36.Rc7+ Kh8 37.Ne5 e2 38.Nxe6 1–0
Black resigns.

==== Game 8, Anand–Gelfand, 1–0 ====
Position after 16...Qxh1

Position: a8 black rook, b8 black knight, e8 black rook, g8 black king, a7 black pawn, b7 black pawn, f7 black pawn, h7 black pawn, d6 black pawn, g6 black pawn, c5 black pawn, d5 white pawn, h5 white pawn, c4 white pawn, c3 white knight, a2 white pawn, b2 white pawn, c2 white king, d2 white queen, h2 white pawn, b1 white rook, f1 white bishop, h1 black queen

Game 8: Anand played 17.Qf2!, which trapped Gelfand's queen, resulting in immediate resignation from Black.

Anand started the game with the same play as in the third game, but Gelfand early deviated by playing 3 ...c5 instead of 3 ...d5, which was seen in the game 3. The game was followed with 4.d5 d6 5.e4 Bg7 6.Ne2 0-0 7.Nec3 Nh5. Gelfand tried to provoke g4 by playing 7 ...Nh5, but Anand did not opt for that line. But after few moves the Black bishop occupied the f5 square and let White the opportunity to play 12.g4 with a fork on Black's bishop and knight. The game continued with 12 ...Re8+ 13.Kd1 Bxb1 14.Rxb1. Gelfand made a serious error on move 14, overlooking Anand's 17.Qf2, which trapped Gelfand's queen. This idea was also missed by grandmaster commentators Peter Leko and Ian Nepomniachtchi, who preferred Black's position until Anand played 17.Qf2. Gelfand could have saved his queen by sacrificing his knight with 17...Nc6 18.dxc6 Qxc6, but his position was still lost. After 19. Bg2, if 19...Qd7 then Nd5 threatens a killing knight fork on f6, while after 19...Qc8 20. Rf1 (attacking the f7-pawn) White also gets a decisive attack. Some threats are 21. Bd5 piling up the pressure against the pawn, 21. Nd5 threatening forks on f6 or e7, and 21. Qf6 intending h6 and Qg7#.

At only 17 moves, this was the shortest decisive game in World Championship history.

King's Indian Defence, E60

1.d4 Nf6 2.c4 g6 3.f3 c5 4.d5 d6 5.e4 Bg7 6.Ne2 0-0 7.Nec3 Nh5 8.Bg5 Bf6 9.Bxf6 exf6 10.Qd2 f5 11.exf5 Bxf5 12.g4 Re8+ 13.Kd1 Bxb1 14.Rxb1 Qf6 15.gxh5 Qxf3+ 16.Kc2 Qxh1 17.Qf2! 1–0
Black resigns.

==== Game 9, Gelfand–Anand, ½–½ ====
Position after 18...Qxd6!?

Position: c8 black rook, e8 black rook, g8 black king, a7 black pawn, d7 black knight, f7 black pawn, g7 black pawn, b6 black pawn, d6 black queen, e6 black pawn, f6 black knight, h6 black pawn, c4 white pawn, d4 white pawn, h4 white bishop, d3 white bishop, f3 white queen, a2 white pawn, f2 white pawn, g2 white pawn, h2 white pawn, c1 white rook, d1 white rook, g1 white king

Game 9: Anand provoked Gelfand to play 19.c5?!, and subsequently exchange a rook, bishop and a pawn for Black's queen.

For the first time in the match, the Nimzo-Indian Defence was played. Gelfand obtained a slight edge in the opening by having a position with a bishop pair and hanging central pawns against two knights and a healthy pawn structure on the opposite side. Gelfand chose a concrete line in the middlegame that was criticized by several Grandmasters and exchanged a rook, bishop and pawn for the Anand's queen. However, Anand found a way to make a fortress and defended the game that was drawn after 49 moves as the longest game since the start of the match.

Black played 15 ...Bxf3, which was evaluated to be a strange and unnecessary move, according to Peter Svidler. In the following moves White got a better position with a bishop pair and a mobile center. But, Black played 18 ...Qd6!? and provoked White to play 19.c5?!. The move was criticised in the press room and moves like 19.a3, proposed by Smirin or 19.h3, proposed by Grischuk and Shipov were probably better. The game entered an endgame with a queen for White and a rook, knight and a pawn for black. White was trying to play on the a7 pawn and to attack on the kingside, but Black appeared to have found the right evaluation in the end. He played 40 ...Ne4! before the time control, and the game was drawn after move 49.

Nimzo-Indian Defence, E54

1.d4 Nf6 2.c4 e6 3.Nc3 Bb4 4.e3 0-0 5.Bd3 d5 6.Nf3 c5 7.0-0 dxc4 8.Bxc4 cxd4 9.exd4 b6 10.Bg5 Bb7 11.Qe2 Nbd7 12.Rac1 Rc8 13.Bd3 Bxc3 14.bxc3 Qc7 15.c4 Bxf3 16.Qxf3 Rfe8 17.Rfd1 h6 18.Bh4 Qd6 19.c5 bxc5 20.dxc5 Rxc5 21.Bh7+ Kxh7 22.Rxd6 Rxc1+ 23.Rd1 Rec8 24.h3 Ne5 25.Qe2 Ng6 26.Bxf6 gxf6 27.Rxc1 Rxc1+ 28.Kh2 Rc7 29.Qb2 Kg7 30.a4 Ne7 31.a5 Nd5 32.a6 Kh7 33.Qd4 f5 34.f4 Rd7 35.Kg3 Kg6 36.Qh8 Nf6 37.Qb8 h5 38.Kh4 Kh6 39.Qb2 Kg6 40.Qc3 Ne4 41.Qc8 Nf6 42.Qb8 Re7 43.g4 hxg4 44.hxg4 fxg4 45.Qe5 Ng8 46.Qg5+ Kh7 47.Qxg4 f6 48.Qg2 Kh8 49.Qe4 Kg7 ½–½
A draw by mutual agreement.

==== Game 10, Anand–Gelfand, ½–½ ====
Sicilian Defence, Rossolimo Attack, B30

1.e4 c5 2.Nf3 Nc6 3.Bb5 e6 4.Bxc6 bxc6 5.b3 e5 6.Nxe5 Qe7 7.Bb2 d6 8.Nc4 d5 9.Ne3 d4 10.Nc4 Qxe4+ 11.Qe2 Qxe2+ 12.Kxe2 Be6 13.d3 Nf6 14.Nbd2 0-0-0 15.Rhe1 Be7 16.Kf1 Rhe8 17.Ba3 Nd5 18.Ne4 Nb4 19.Re2 Bxc4 20.bxc4 f5 21.Bxb4 cxb4 22.Nd2 Bd6 23.Rxe8 Rxe8 24.Nb3 c5 25.a3 ½–½
A draw by mutual agreement.

==== Game 11, Gelfand–Anand, ½–½ ====
Position after 16...Rac8

Position: c8 black rook, f8 black rook, g8 black king, a7 black pawn, b7 black pawn, d7 black knight, f7 black pawn, g7 black pawn, h7 black pawn, c6 black bishop, e6 black pawn, f6 black knight, h5 black queen, c4 white pawn, d4 white pawn, f4 white bishop, a3 white pawn, d3 white bishop, f3 white knight, e2 white queen, f2 white pawn, g2 white pawn, h2 white pawn, a1 white rook, d1 white rook, g1 white king

Game 11: At this point, Gelfand decided not to take a risk and enter the exchange of queens with 17.Ne5 instead of 17.Nd2 e5! and some complications in the position.

The game started in a Nimzo-Indian Defence as in the game 9. First surprise of the game was at move 8, when Anand played 8 ...Bd7, a developing move with idea to bring the knight on the c6 square in the future. The instigator of this move was David Bronstein, but it was popular and played mostly during the middle of the 20th century.

At move 17 (see diagram), Gelfand decided not to take a risk by playing 17.Ne5 instead of the more ambitious 17.Nd2 followed with 17 ...e5! and some complications. The position that arrived after the exchange of queens was slightly better for White, but Black was in no danger. Both players agreed to a draw after 24 moves were played.

Nimzo-Indian Defence, E54

1.d4 Nf6 2.c4 e6 3.Nc3 Bb4 4.e3 0-0 5.Bd3 d5 6.Nf3 c5 7.0-0 dxc4 8.Bxc4 Bd7 9.a3 Ba5 10.Qe2 Bc6 11.Rd1 Bxc3 12.bxc3 Nbd7 13.Bd3 Qa5 14.c4 cxd4 15.exd4 Qh5 16.Bf4 Rac8 17.Ne5 Qxe2 18.Bxe2 Nxe5 19.Bxe5 Rfd8 20.a4 Ne4 21.Rd3 f6 22.Bf4 Be8 23.Rb3 Rxd4 24.Be3 Rd7 ½–½
A draw by mutual agreement.

==== Game 12, Anand–Gelfand, ½–½ ====
Position after 10.Nd2

Position: a8 black rook, c8 black bishop, d8 black queen, e8 black king, f8 black bishop, h8 black rook, a7 black pawn, f7 black pawn, g7 black pawn, h7 black pawn, c6 black pawn, e6 black pawn, c5 black pawn, e5 black pawn, h4 white pawn, b3 white pawn, d3 white pawn, a2 white pawn, c2 white pawn, d2 white knight, f2 white pawn, g2 white pawn, a1 white rook, c1 white bishop, d1 white queen, e1 white king, h1 white rook

Game 12: Gelfand spent 40 minutes and sacrificed two pawns by playing 10...c4!, seeking active play.

Sicilian Defence, Rossolimo Attack, B30

1.e4 c5 2.Nf3 Nc6 3.Bb5 e6 4.Bxc6 bxc6 5.d3 Ne7 6.b3 d6 7.e5 Ng6 8.h4 Nxe5 9.Nxe5 dxe5 10.Nd2 c4 11.Nxc4 Ba6 12.Qf3 Qd5 13.Qxd5 cxd5 14.Nxe5 f6 15.Nf3 e5 16.0-0 Kf7 17.c4 Be7 18.Be3 Bb7 19.cxd5 Bxd5 20.Rfc1 a5 21.Bc5 Rhd8 22.Bxe7 ½–½
A draw by mutual agreement.

=== Tiebreak games ===
Anand retained the world title by defeating Gelfand in the rapid round. He was able to put time pressure on Gelfand in all four games. In the second game with white, Anand played his moves so fast that Gelfand was forced to make moves with very few seconds to spare.

==== Game 13, Gelfand–Anand, ½–½ ====
Position after 21.Reb1

Position: c8 black rook, e8 black rook, g8 black king, a7 black pawn, b7 black pawn, d7 black bishop, f7 black pawn, g7 black pawn, h6 black pawn, d5 white pawn, e5 black bishop, a4 white pawn, d4 black pawn, e4 white bishop, b3 black queen, g3 white pawn, b2 white bishop, d2 white queen, f2 white pawn, h2 white pawn, a1 white rook, b1 white rook, g1 white king

Game 13: Anand, playing black played 21...Bxg3 but 22.Ra3! was a strong reply.

Semi-Slav Defense, D46

1.d4 d5 2.c4 c6 3.Nc3 Nf6 4.e3 e6 5.Nf3 Nbd7 6.Qc2 Bd6 7.Bd3 0-0 8.0-0 e5 9.cxd5 cxd5 10.e4 exd4 11.Nxd5 Nxd5 12.exd5 h6 13.b3 Ne5 14.Nxe5 Bxe5 15.Re1 Re8 16.Bb2 Bd7 17.Qd2 Qf6 18.g3 Rac8 19.a4 Qf3 20.Be4 Qxb3 21.Reb1 Bxg3 22.Ra3 Qb6 23.Bxd4 Bxh2+ 24.Kxh2 Qd6+ 25.Rg3 Rxe4 26.Bxg7 Kh7 27.Rxb7 Rg8 28.Qxh6+ Qxh6+ 29.Bxh6 Rxg3 30.Kxg3 Bc8 31.Rc7 Kxh6 32.Rxc8 Rxa4 ½–½
A draw by mutual agreement.

==== Game 14, Anand–Gelfand, 1–0 ====
Position after 71...Rf5?

Position: d8 black king, g6 white rook, a5 white king, b5 white pawn, c5 white knight, f5 black rook, f3 black bishop

Game 14: Anand, playing white, exchanged his knight for Black's bishop by playing 72.Ne6+!, resulting in the classical Lucena position, which is won for White.

Sicilian Defence, Rossolimo Attack, B30

1. e4 c5 2. Nf3 Nc6 3. Bb5 e6 4. Bxc6 bxc6 5. b3 e5 6. Nxe5 Qe7 7. d4 d6 8. Nxc6 Qxe4+ 9. Qe2 Qxe2+ 10. Kxe2 Bb7 11. Na5 Bxg2 12. Rg1 Bh3 13. dxc5 dxc5 14. Nc3 0-0-0 15. Bf4 Bd6 16. Bxd6 Rxd6 17. Rg5 Nf6 18. Rxc5+ Kb8 19. Nc4 Re8+ 20. Ne3 Ng4 21. Nd5 Nxe3 22. Nxe3 Bg4+ 23. f3 Bc8 24. Re1 Rh6 25. Rh1 Rhe6 26. Rc3 f5 27. Kd2 f4 28. Nd5 g5 29. Rd3 Re2+ 30. Kc1 Rf2 31. h4 Ree2 32. Rc3 Bb7 33. Rd1 gxh4 34. Nxf4 Re8 35. Rh1 Rc8 36. Rxc8+ Bxc8 37. Rxh4 Bf5 38. Rh5 Bxc2 39. Rb5+ Ka8 40. Nd5 a6 41. Ra5 Kb7 42. Nb4 Bg6 43. Nxa6 Rxf3 44. Nc5+ Kb6 45. b4 Rf4 46. a3 Rg4 47. Kd2 h5 48. Nd7+ Kb7 49. Ne5 Rg2+ 50. Kc3 Be8 51. Nd3 h4 52. Re5 Bg6 53. Nf4 Rg3+ 54. Kd4 Bc2 55. Rh5 Rxa3 56. Rxh4 Rg3 57. Nd5 Rg5 58. b5 Bf5 59. Rh6 Bg4 60. Rf6 Rf5 61. Rb6+ Ka7 62. Rg6 Bf3 63. Rg7+ Kb8 64. Nc3 Bb7 65. Kc4 Bf3 66. Kb4 Bd5 67. Na4 Rf7 68. Rg5 Bf3 69. Nc5 Kc7 70. Rg6 Kd8 71. Ka5 Rf5 72. Ne6+ Kc8 73. Nd4 Rf8 74. Nxf3 Rxf3 75. Kb6 Rb3 76. Rg8+ Kd7 77. Rb8 1–0
Black resigns.

==== Game 15, Gelfand–Anand, ½–½ ====
Position after 25...Nxe5

Position: b8 black bishop, f8 black rook, g8 black king, a7 black pawn, c7 black rook, e7 black queen, a6 white bishop, c6 black pawn, c5 white pawn, d5 black pawn, e5 black knight, f5 black pawn, d4 white pawn, e4 black knight, c3 white knight, h3 white pawn, a2 white pawn, b2 white rook, c2 white queen, g2 white pawn, b1 white rook, g1 white king

Game 15: Here, Gelfand played 26.Rxb8, relinquishing most of the advantage he had built over the course of the game, and allowed Anand back to the game. Had he played 26.Nxe4!, he would have had a winning position.

Slav Defense, D12

1. d4 d5 2. c4 c6 3. Nf3 Nf6 4. e3 Bf5 5. Nc3 e6 6. Nh4 Bg6 7. Nxg6 hxg6 8. Bd3 Nbd7 9. 0-0 Bd6 10. h3 0-0 11. Qc2 Qe7 12. Rd1 Rac8 13. c5 Bb8 14. f4 Ne8 15. b4 g5 16. Rb1 f5 17. b5 gxf4 18. exf4 Nef6 19. bxc6 bxc6 20. Ba6 Rc7 21. Be3 Ne4 22. Rb2 g5 23. Rdb1 gxf4 24. Bxf4 e5 25. Bxe5 Nxe5 26. Rxb8 Ng6 27. Nxe4 fxe4 28. Qf2 Qg7 29. Kh2 Rcf7 30. Qg3 Nf4 31. R8b3 Qxg3+ 32. Rxg3+ Kh7 33. Rd1 Ne6 34. Be2 Rf2 35. Bg4 Nf4 36. Rb1 Rf7 37. Rb8 Rxa2 38. Rc8 e3 39. Rxe3 Rxg2+ 40. Kh1 Rd2 41. Rxc6 Ne6 42. Rf3 Rxf3 43. Bxf3 Nxd4 44. Rc7+ Kh6 45. Bxd5 Rc2 46. Be4 Rc3 47. Kg2 Kg5 48. Kh2 Nf3+ 49. Bxf3 Rxf3 50. Rxa7 Rc3 51. Rc7 Kf4 52. Rc8 Ke5 53. c6 Kd6 54. h4 Ra3 55. Kg2 Re3 56. h5 Re5 57. h6 Rh5 58. Rh8 Kxc6 59. Rh7 Kd6 ½–½
A draw by mutual agreement.

==== Game 16, Anand–Gelfand, ½–½ ====
Final position after 56.Kb2

Position: a6 black rook, d6 black pawn, e6 white rook, c5 black pawn, d5 white pawn, b4 black pawn, c4 white pawn, b3 white pawn, f3 black king, b2 white king

Game 16: Final position of game 16, where both players agreed to a draw, which meant Anand won the match.

Sicilian Defence, Canal–Sokolsky Attack, B50

1. e4 c5 2. Nf3 d6 3. Bb5+ Nd7 4. d4 Ngf6 5. e5 Qa5+ 6. Nc3 Ne4 7. Bd2 Nxc3 8. Bxd7+ Bxd7 9. Bxc3 Qa6 10. exd6 exd6 11. Qe2+ Qxe2+ 12. Kxe2 f6 13. b3 Bb5+ 14. Kd2 Bc6 15. Rad1 Kf7 16. Kc1 Be7 17. d5 Bd7 18. Bb2 b5 19. Nd2 a5 20. Rhe1 Rhe8 21. Re3 f5 22. Rde1 g5 23. c4 b4 24. g3 Bf8 25. Rxe8 Bxe8 26. Nf3 Kg6 27. Re6+ Kh5 28. h3 Bf7 29. Rf6 Bg6 30. Re6 Re8 31. Bf6 g4 32. hxg4+ Kxg4 33. Nh2+ Kh3 34. Nf3 f4 35. gxf4 Kg4 36. Ng5 Ra8 37. Re3 Kf5 38. Bb2 a4 39. Ne6 Bh6 40. Rh3 Bxf4+ 41. Nxf4 Kxf4 42. Bf6 Ra7 43. Re3 Be4 44. Bh4 axb3 45. Bg3+ Kf5 46. axb3 Ra1+ 47. Kd2 Ra2+ 48. Ke1 Ra6 49. f3 Bb1 50. Kd2 h5 51. Kc1 h4 52. Bxh4 Kf4 53. Bg5+ Kxg5 54. Kxb1 Kf4 55. Re6 Kxf3 56. Kb2 ½–½
A draw by mutual agreement.

== Match results ==
World Chess Championship Match 2012
	Rating	1	2	3	4	5	6	7	8	9	10	11	12	Points	13	14	15	16	Total
Viswanathan Anand (India)	2791	½	½	½	½	½	½	0	1	½	½	½	½	6	½	1	½	½	8½
Boris Gelfand (Israel)	2727	½	½	½	½	½	½	1	0	½	½	½	½	6	½	0	½	½	7½

== Timeline of changes ==
The procedures for choosing the challenger and host underwent a number of changes and controversies. A timeline is shown below:

- February 2007 – FIDE initially announces that the challenger will be the winner of the Chess World Cup ("Proposal A"). This leads to protests from a number of leading grandmasters, so this proposal is soon scrapped.
- June 2007 – FIDE President Kirsan Ilyumzhinov announces a structure culminating in a two-player Challenger Match:
  - The first stage is the FIDE Grand Prix 2008–2010, a grand prix series of tournaments between twenty-one élite players, beginning in April 2008.
  - In late 2009, FIDE will stage the Chess World Cup 2009, a series of knockout mini-matches following a similar format to the Chess World Cup 2007 (128 players, seven rounds).
  - In 2010, an eight-game Challenger Match will be played between the FIDE Grand Prix 2008–2010 winner and the Chess World Cup 2009 winner.
  - The winner of the challenger match will play the defending champion in a twelve-game match in September 2011.
  - Starting with this 2011 championship FIDE plans to hold future World Chess Championships on a two-year cycle in the same format.
- February 2008 – Alexander Morozevich announces he is boycotting the Grand Prix, saying the process is too long, unwieldy and disorganised. He claims that Viswanathan Anand, Vladimir Kramnik and Veselin Topalov are also boycotting.
- March 2008 – The line-up for the Grand Prix is announced. The top four rated players in the world at the time (Kramnik, Anand, Topalov, Morozevich) are not in the tournament; other eligible players not participating are Alexei Shirov and Judit Polgár. The Week in Chess reports that Kramnik and Topalov are not participating because the event had insufficient prize money.
- April–May 2008 – First Grand Prix tournament takes place in Baku, Azerbaijan.
- July–August 2008 – Second Grand Prix tournament takes place in Sochi, Russia.
- 23 November 2008 – Qatar, who was scheduled to hold the third Grand Prix beginning on 13 December, withdraws as a host nation, and is replaced by Elista, Russia.
- 25 November 2008 – Ilyumzhinov announces the new structure (the eight-player Candidates Tournament described above, instead of a two-player Challenger Match).
- 26 November 2008 – The changes are ratified the next day at the FIDE Congress.
- 5 December 2008 – Magnus Carlsen withdraws from the FIDE Grand Prix 2008–2010 in protest at the changes partway through the cycle. He argues that the Grand Prix players have been disadvantaged, as the winner now qualifies for an eight-player tournament instead of a two-player Challenger Match.
- 6 December 2008 – Levon Aronian issues an open letter of protest, but does not withdraw from the Grand Prix.
- 11 December 2008 – Michael Adams withdraws from the Grand Prix for similar reasons to Carlsen.
- 13 December 2008 – The third Grand Prix tournament begins in Elista, Russia, with a number of changes to the playing list (see FIDE Grand Prix 2008–2010).
- 15 December 2008 – Ilyumzhinov announces that both events will take place (the two-player Challenger Match and the eight-player Candidates Tournament), with a final decision on the structure in March 2009.
- 16 December 2008 – The Association of Chess Professionals objects to the change, saying, "The system of the World Championship cannot be changed once the cycle has started."
- 11 February 2009 – Universal Event Promotion (UEP), the company which organised the World Chess Championship 2008 match, submits a bid to host the Candidates Tournament as a series of matches.
- 9 March 2009 – FIDE accepts UEP's bid, confirming that an eight-player Candidates Tournament will take place. No mention is made of the Challenger Match. There is also a slight change to the qualification for the Candidates Tournament: two players (rather than one) are to be taken from the ratings list, and the winner of the World Chess Cup 2009 qualifies, but the runner-up does not.
- 22 June 2009 – FIDE announces regulations for the eight-player Candidates Tournament, indicating it will be organised as a series of short matches.
- October 2009 – it is reported that the Candidates matches will be organised by Azerbaijan, but that the matches involving Armenia's Levon Aronian will be played elsewhere; and that the matches will be played at the end of 2010 and start of 2011.
- 20 October 2009 – The FIDE Executive Board gave an option to London to organise the event and announced that it would only open the bidding procedure if London would not take the option.
- 20 April 2010 – London confirms holding an option to organise the 2012 World Chess Championship.
- 26 July 2010 – The FIDE Presidential Board in Tromso, Norway decides to move the Candidates matches from Azerbaijan to Kazan, Russia, with Mamedyarov's position intact. If Topalov refuses to play in Kazan, Alexander Grischuk, the third-place finisher in the FIDE Grand Prix, will take his place.
- 28 July 2010 – After learning of FIDE's intention of replacing him with Grischuk should he refuse to play, Topalov backs off of his previous statement refusing to play in Russia, and indicates that he will participate in Kazan.
- 29 July 2010 – Topalov (through his manager) indicates that he would still refuse to play a match against any Russian in Kazan; this could not theoretically happen until the Candidates final, since Kramnik and Grischuk are the only Russians in the Candidates Tournament and play in the lower half of the bracket, while Topalov plays in the upper bracket; at the time of this statement, Kramnik was the only Russian in the field.
- 5 November 2010 – Magnus Carlsen decides not to take part in the planned Candidate Matches.
- 10 November 2010 – FIDE announces that Grischuk will replace Carlsen. Any other withdrawals will be replaced by Dmitry Jakovenko, the fourth-place finisher in the FIDE Grand Prix.
- 3 February 2011 – London withdraws its 2012 World Championship bid.
- 28 June 2011 – Moscow confirms bidding to host the 2012 World Championship.
- 13 July 2011 – Chennai bids to host the 2012 World Championship.
- 9 August 2011 – Skolkovo near Moscow chosen as 2012 World Championship venue.
- 26 November 2011 – 2012 World Championship match in Moscow relocated to Tretyakov Gallery.
- 20 February 2012 – hosting agreement signed between the Russian Chess Federation and the Tretyakov Gallery.
