= Pavel Eljanov =

Ukrainian chess grandmaster (born 1983)

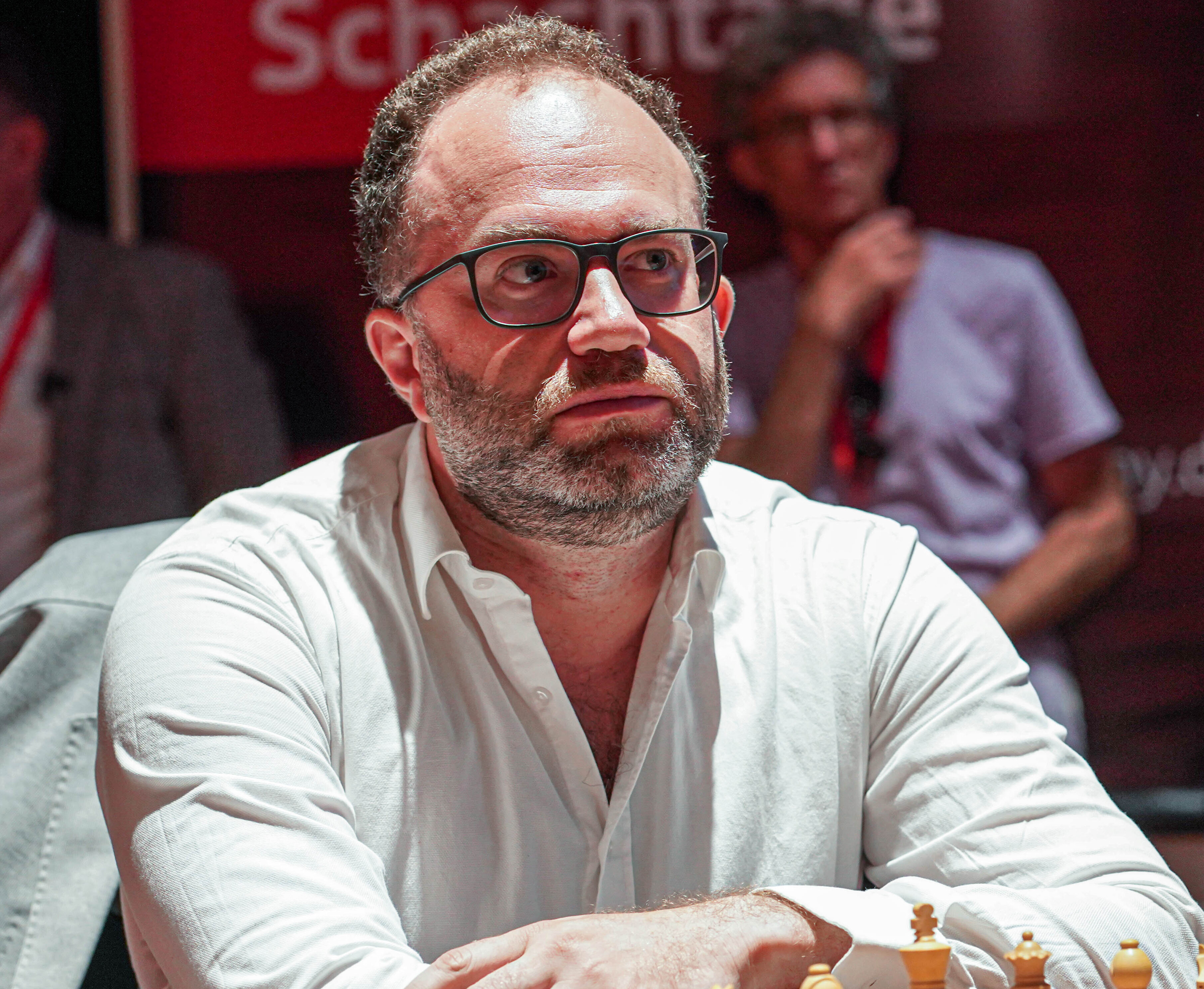
- Eljanov in 2023

Personal information
- Born: Павло Володимирович Ельянов; 10 May 1983 (age 43) Kharkiv, Ukrainian SSR, Soviet Union
- Spouse: Olena Dvoretska (m. 2009)

Chess career
- Country: Ukraine
- Title: Grandmaster (2001)
- FIDE rating: 2664 (July 2026)
- Peak rating: 2765 (March 2016)
- Ranking: No. 53 (July 2026)
- Peak ranking: No. 6 (September 2010)

Pavel Volodymyrovych Eljanov (Ukrainian: Павло Володимирович Ельянов, romanized: Pavlo Volodymyrovych Elyanov; born 10 May 1983) is a Ukrainian chess grandmaster. He has won two team gold medals and one individual silver medal at the Chess Olympiads.

He acted as a second for Boris Gelfand in the World Chess Championship 2007, Candidates Matches 2011 and World Chess Championship 2012, for Magnus Carlsen in the World Chess Championship 2013, and for Mariya Muzychuk in the Women's World Chess Championship 2016.

== Career ==
In 1999, he was a member of the Ukrainian national youth team, which won the Under-16 Chess Olympiad in Artek, Ukraine. In 2007 Eljanov won the B group of the Corus Chess Tournament in Wijk aan Zee, the Netherlands with a score of 9/13 points. This result enabled him to qualify for the category 20 tournament Corus A group of 2008. In the latter he scored 5/13 points.

He won the 2009 Bosna Chess Tournament (pl), a six-player double round-robin tournament in Sarajevo, with a score of 7/10 points. In the same year, Eljanov played in the GM Rapid event of the Richard Riordan Chess Festival at the 18th Maccabiah Games.

In May 2010, he won the Astrakhan stage of FIDE Grand Prix 2008–2010 scoring 8/13. In August 2010, he won the Politiken Cup in Copenhagen. In the September 2010 FIDE World Rankings Eljanov had a rating of 2761, making him number 1 in Ukraine and number 6 in the world.

In February 2012, he tied for 1st–3rd with Mateusz Bartel and Anton Korobov in the 11th Aeroflot Open. In February 2013, Eljanov took first place on tiebreak in the strong Reykjavik Open. Later that year, in September, he won the 14th Anatoly Karpov International Tournament (pl), a category 18 round-robin event in Poikovsky, Russia. In the following month he won another strong open tournament, the Chigorin Memorial.

In April 2014, he won the B tournament of the Gashimov Memorial in Şəmkir, Azerbaijan. In the FIDE World Cup 2015, Eljanov defeated Rinat Jumabayev, Alexander Ipatov, Alexander Grischuk, Dmitry Jakovenko and Hikaru Nakamura to reach the semifinals. He was then defeated in rapid tiebreaks by the eventual winner, Sergey Karjakin. This result enabled Eljanov to qualify to play in the FIDE Grand Prix series 2017. In 2016, he won the Chess.com Isle of Man International tournament in Douglas edging out Fabiano Caruana on tiebreak after both scored 7½/9 points.

In July 2021, he won the 48th International Dortmund Schachtage Deutschland Grand Prix, scoring 6/9.

== Personal life ==
His father was International Master Vladimir Eljanov. In April 2009 Eljanov married WIM Olena Dvoretska. He has a daughter born in 2011.

Eljanov graduated from the Yaroslav Mudryi National Law University.
