= FIDE Grand Prix 2008–2010 =

Chess tournament series

FIDE Grand Prix Series 2008–10
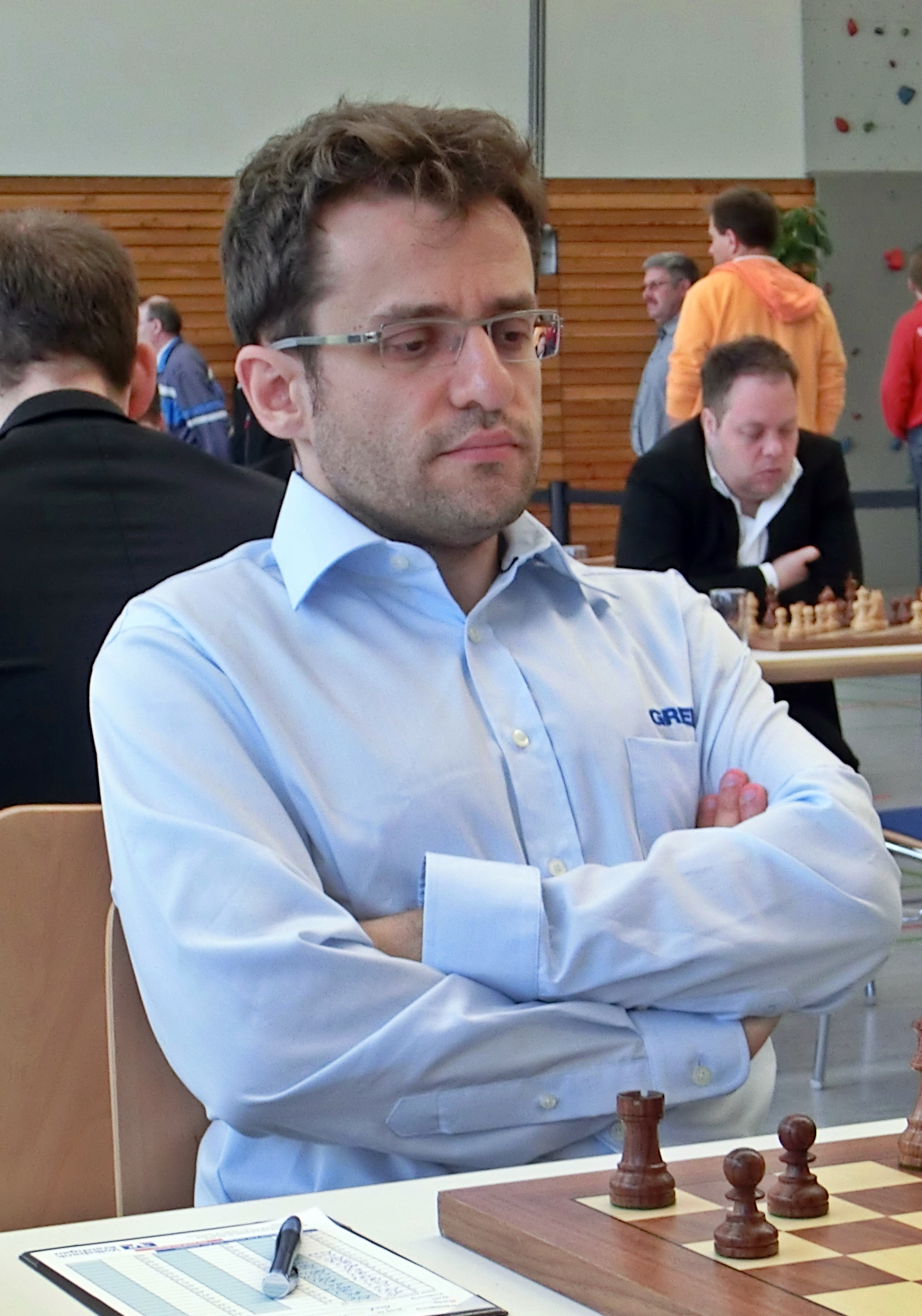
- FIDE Grand Prix 2008–10 winner Levon Aronian

Tournament information
- Sport: Chess
- Location: (Azerbaijan) Baku (Russia) Sochi (Russia) Elista (Russia) Nalchik (Armenia) Jermuk (Russia) Astrakhan
- Dates: 19 April 2008– 25 May 2010
- Administrator: FIDE
- Tournament format: Series of round-robin tournaments

Final positions
- Champion: (Armenia) Levon Aronian
- Runner-up: (Azerbaijan) Teimour Radjabov

The FIDE Grand Prix 2008–2010 was a series of six chess tournaments that formed part of the qualification for the World Chess Championship 2012. It was administered by FIDE, the World Chess Federation. The event was won by Levon Aronian, with Teimour Radjabov second and Alexander Grischuk third.

The top two finishers formed two of the eight players who played in the 2011 Candidates Tournament to determine the challenger for the world champion. After Magnus Carlsen withdrew from the Candidates, Grischuk took his place, due to his third place in the Grand Prix.

The winner of the Grand Prix was originally scheduled to play a match in 2010 against the winner of the Chess World Cup 2009, with the winner of that match becoming the challenger for the World Chess Championship 2012. On 25 November, 2008, FIDE announced major changes, with the winner and runner-up qualifying instead for an eight-player Candidates Tournament. This caused a number of protests, with Magnus Carlsen and Michael Adams withdrawing, and two other players being replaced. (For details, see World Chess Championship 2012.)

A number of host cities withdrew, causing all the tournaments except the first two to be rescheduled.

== Format ==
There were six tournaments spread over 2008, 2009 and 2010. Each of the 21 participating players were originally scheduled to play in exactly four of the six tournaments; though this was complicated when some players withdrew partway through.

Each tournament was a 14 player, single round-robin tournament. In each round players scored 1 point for a win, 1/2 point for a draw and 0 for a loss. Grand Prix points were then allocated according to each player's standing in the tournament: 180 Grand Prix points for first place, 150 for second place, 130 for third place, and then 110 down to 10 points for places four to fourteen (decreasing by 10 points for each place). (Grand Prix points were split between players on equal tournament points).

Players only counted their best three tournament results. The player with the most Grand Prix points was the winner.

If a tie-break was needed for the overall Grand Prix winner, the system was:

1. The fourth result not already in the top three performances
2. The number of actual game points scored in the four tournaments
3. The number of first-place finishes
4. The number of second-place finishes
5. The number of won games
6. Drawing of lots

=== Tournament dates ===
The tournament dates and locations were as follows:

- 20 April – 6 May, 2008, Baku, Azerbaijan
- 30 July – 15 August, 2008, Sochi, Russia
- 13–29 December, 2008, Elista, Russia (rescheduled from Doha, Qatar, in November 2008)
- 14–30 April, 2009, Nalchik, Russia (rescheduled from Montreux, Switzerland)
- 9–24 August, 2009, Jermuk, Armenia (rescheduled from Elista, Russia)
- 9–25 May, 2010, Astrakhan, Russia (rescheduled from Karlovy Vary, Czech Republic, in October 2009)

=== Draw rules ===
A variation from normal chess rules was that the players were not allowed to talk to each other during the game and a draw by agreement was not allowed. A draw had to be claimed with the arbiter, who was assisted by an active grandmaster who had the title for at least ten years. The only draws allowed (except for stalemate) were:

- Threefold repetition of position
- Fifty-move rule
- Perpetual check
- A theoretical draw.

== Participants ==
=== Qualification ===
- The four players who (at the start of 2008) were still in contention for the 2008 and 2010 championships qualified: Viswanathan Anand, Vladimir Kramnik, Veselin Topalov and Gata Kamsky.
- Apart from the winner Kamsky, the next top three finishers at the Chess World Cup 2007 qualified: Alexei Shirov, Sergey Karjakin and Magnus Carlsen.
- Seven players were selected on rating. The rating used was the average of the January and October 2007 ratings. FIDE released a list of the top 25 players according to this formula. The first seven players on the list (apart from those who had otherwise qualified) had automatic qualification: Vassily Ivanchuk, Shakhriyar Mamedyarov, Peter Leko, Alexander Morozevich, Levon Aronian, Teimour Radjabov and Boris Gelfand. FIDE also announced that the first four reserves, in order, were Michael Adams, Peter Svidler, Judit Polgár and Alexander Grischuk.
- The FIDE president was allowed to nominate one player from the top 40 in the world. If there were withdrawals, he was allowed to nominate more than one.
- The six host cities were allowed to each nominate one player rated above 2500. The host cities nominated the following players:
  - Baku, Azerbaijan – Vugar Gashimov
  - Sochi, Russia – Dmitry Jakovenko
  - Doha, Qatar – Mohamad Al-Modiahki
  - Montreux, Switzerland – Yannick Pelletier
  - Elista, Russia – Ernesto Inarkiev
  - Karlovy Vary, Czech Republic – David Navara

=== Prominent non-participants ===
Of the original 14 players who qualified, Anand, Kramnik and Topalov (2008/2010 contenders), Shirov (World Cup 2007) and Morozevich (ratings list) were all not taking part. One of the first four nominated reserves, Judit Polgár, was also not participating. The lineup for the Grand Prix included 13 of the 20 top-rated Grandmasters at the time it was announced, though none of the top four.

The only one to publicly give a reason was Alexander Morozevich, who announced that he was boycotting the Grand Prix, saying the process was too long, unwieldy and disorganised. He claimed that Anand, Kramnik and Topalov were also boycotting. The Week in Chess reported that Kramnik and Topalov were not participating because the event had insufficient prize money.

Josef Resch of Universal Event Promotion (organizer of 2008 World Championship) also spoke about the difficulties in organizational details with FIDE in the totality of the World Chess Championship cycle.

=== Original participants ===
On 5 March, 2008, FIDE released the list of participants, along with their world rankings according to the January 2008 ratings list (shown here in brackets).

- 1 from the 2008/2010 cycle: Gata Kamsky (15).
- 2 from the Chess World Cup 2007: Magnus Carlsen (13), Sergey Karjakin (14).
- 6 from the rating list: Shakhriyar Mamedyarov (6), Peter Leko (8), Vassily Ivanchuk (9), Levon Aronian (10), Boris Gelfand (11), Teimour Radjabov (12)
- 2 from the reserve ratings list: Michael Adams (16), Alexander Grischuk (21)
- 4 FIDE president nominees: Peter Svidler (5), Ivan Cheparinov (19), Étienne Bacrot (22), Wang Yue (25).
- 6 Host city nominees: Dmitry Jakovenko (17), Ernesto Inarkiev (34), David Navara (37), Vugar Gashimov (48), Yannick Pelletier (165), Mohamad Al-Modiahki (274).

=== Changes after the second and third tournaments ===
After Doha and Montreux refused to host tournaments, their nominees Al-Modiahki and Pelletier were removed from the series. Carlsen and Adams withdrew from the Grand Prix. These players were replaced by Evgeny Alekseev, Pavel Eljanov, Rustam Kasimdzhanov (from the rating list) and Vladimir Akopian (Jermuk nominee) from the third tournament onwards.

After Karlovy Vary withdrew in January 2009 (after the third tournament), the Karlovy Vary nominee David Navara was also excluded from the Grand Prix, and was not replaced.

== Prize money and Grand Prix points ==
The regulations indicated the following disbursement of prize monies and Grand Prix points.

Place	Single Grand Prix event	Overall standings	Grand Prix points
1	€30,000	€75,000	180
2	€22,500	€50,000	150
3	€20,000	€40,000	130
4	€15,000	€30,000	110
5	€12,500	€25,000	100
6	€11,000	€20,000	90
7	€10,000	€18,000	80
8	€8,500	€16,000	70
9	€7,500	€14,000	60
10	€6,000	€12,000	50
11	€5,500	–	40
12	€5,000	–	30
13	€4,500	–	20
14	€4,000	–	10

For each event there was 162,000 euros available (for 14 players), and 300,000 euros in the overall standings (top 10).

== Events crosstables ==
=== Baku, April–May 2008 ===
The first Grand Prix event began on 20 April and concluded on 5 May. (Elo average 2717, Cat. XIX).

The final crosstable was as follows:

	Player	Rating	1	2	3	4	5	6	7	8	9	10	11	12	13	14	Total	Grand Prix points
1–3	Vugar Gashimov (Azerbaijan)	2679		1/2	1/2	1/2	1	1/2	1	1/2	1	1/2	1/2	1/2	1/2	1/2	8	153 1/3
1–3	Wang Yue (China)	2689	1/2		1/2	1/2	1/2	1/2	1	1/2	1/2	1	1	1/2	1/2	1/2	8	153 1/3
1–3	Magnus Carlsen (Norway)	2765	1/2	1/2		0	1/2	1	1/2	1	1/2	1/2	1/2	1/2	1	1	8	153 1/3
4–5	Shakhriyar Mamedyarov (Azerbaijan)	2752	1/2	1/2	1		1/2	1/2	1/2	1/2	1/2	1	0	1	1	0	7 1/2	105
4–5	Alexander Grischuk (Russia)	2716	0	1/2	1/2	1/2		1/2	1/2	1/2	1/2	1/2	1	1	1/2	1	7 1/2	105
6–7	Michael Adams (England)	2729	1/2	1/2	0	1/2	1/2		1	1/2	0	0	1	1	1/2	1/2	6 1/2	85
6–7	Peter Svidler (Russia)	2746	0	0	1/2	1/2	1/2	0		1/2	1	1	1/2	1/2	1/2	1	6 1/2	85
8–10	Teimour Radjabov (Azerbaijan)	2751	1/2	1/2	0	1/2	1/2	1/2	1/2		1	1/2	0	0	1	1/2	6	60
8–10	Gata Kamsky (United States)	2726	0	1/2	1/2	1/2	1/2	1	0	0		1/2	1/2	1/2	1/2	1	6	60
8–10	Sergey Karjakin (Ukraine)	2732	1/2	0	1/2	0	1/2	1	0	1/2	1/2		1/2	1/2	1/2	1	6	60
11–12	Ivan Cheparinov (Bulgaria)	2696	1/2	0	1/2	1	0	0	1/2	1	1/2	1/2		0	0	1	5 1/2	35
11–12	David Navara (Czech Republic)	2672	1/2	1/2	1/2	0	0	0	1/2	1	1/2	1/2	1		1/2	0	5 1/2	35
13–14	Étienne Bacrot (France)	2705	1/2	1/2	0	0	1/2	1/2	1/2	0	1/2	1/2	1	1/2		0	5	15
13–14	Ernesto Inarkiev (Russia)	2684	1/2	1/2	0	1	0	1/2	0	1/2	0	0	0	1	1		5	15

=== Sochi, July–August 2008 ===
The second Grand Prix event began on 31 July and concluded on 14 August. (Elo average 2708, Cat. XIX).

The final crosstable was as follows:

	Player	Rating	1	2	3	4	5	6	7	8	9	10	11	12	13	14	Total	Grand Prix points
1	Levon Aronian (Armenia)	2737		1/2	1/2	1/2	1/2	1/2	1/2	0	1/2	1	1	1	1	1	8 1/2	180
2	Teimour Radjabov (Azerbaijan)	2744	1/2		0	1/2	0	1/2	1	1/2	1/2	1/2	1	1	1	1	8	150
3–4	Wang Yue (China)	2704	1/2	1		1/2	1/2	1/2	1/2	1/2	1/2	1/2	1/2	1	1/2	1/2	7 1/2	120
3–4	Gata Kamsky (United States)	2723	1/2	1/2	1/2		1/2	1/2	1/2	1	1/2	1/2	0	1/2	1	1	7 1/2	120
5–7	Peter Svidler (Russia)	2738	1/2	1	1/2	1/2		1	0	0	1	1/2	0	1/2	1/2	1	7	90
5–7	Dmitry Jakovenko (Russia)	2709	1/2	1/2	1/2	1/2	0		1/2	1/2	1	1/2	1	1/2	1/2	1/2	7	90
5–7	Sergey Karjakin (Ukraine)	2727	1/2	0	1/2	1/2	1	1/2		1/2	1/2	0	1	1/2	1/2	1	7	90
8–9	Vasyl Ivanchuk (Ukraine)	2781	1	1/2	1/2	0	1	1/2	1/2		1/2	1/2	1/2	0	1/2	1/2	6 1/2	65
8–9	Vugar Gashimov (Azerbaijan)	2717	1/2	1/2	1/2	1/2	0	0	1/2	1/2		1/2	1/2	1/2	1	1	6 1/2	65
10–11	Alexander Grischuk (Russia)	2728	0	1/2	1/2	1/2	1/2	1/2	1	1/2	1/2		0	1/2	1/2	1/2	6	45
10–11	Ivan Cheparinov (Bulgaria)	2687	0	0	1/2	1	1	0	0	1/2	1/2	1		1/2	1/2	1/2	6	45
12	Boris Gelfand (Israel)	2720	0	0	0	1/2	1/2	1/2	1/2	1	1/2	1/2	1/2		1/2	1/2	5 1/2	30
13–14	David Navara (Czech Republic)	2646	0	0	1/2	0	1/2	1/2	1/2	1/2	0	1/2	1/2	1/2		0	4	15
13–14	Mohammed Al-Modiahki (Qatar)	2556	0	0	1/2	0	0	1/2	0	1/2	0	1/2	1/2	1/2	1		4	15

=== Elista, December 2008 ===
The third Grand Prix event began on 14 December and concluded on 28 December. (Elo average 2713, Cat. XIX).

The final crosstable was as follows:

	Player	Rating	1	2	3	4	5	6	7	8	9	10	11	12	13	14	Total	Grand Prix points
1–3	Teimour Radjabov (Azerbaijan)	2751		1/2	1/2	1/2	1/2	1	1/2	1/2	1	1/2	1	1	1/2	0	8	153 1/3
1–3	Dmitry Jakovenko (Russia)	2737	1/2		1/2	1/2	1/2	1/2	1/2	1	1	1/2	1/2	1/2	1/2	1	8	153 1/3
1–3	Alexander Grischuk (Russia)	2719	1/2	1/2		0	1	1/2	1/2	1	1/2	1/2	1	1	1/2	1/2	8	153 1/3
4	Vugar Gashimov (Azerbaijan)	2703	1/2	1/2	1		0	1/2	1	1/2	1/2	1/2	1/2	1	1/2	1/2	7 1/2	110
5–9	Peter Leko (Hungary)	2747	1/2	1/2	0	1		0	1/2	1/2	1/2	1	1/2	1/2	1/2	1/2	6 1/2	80
5–9	Étienne Bacrot (France)	2705	0	1/2	1/2	1/2	1		1/2	1/2	1/2	1/2	1/2	1/2	1/2	1/2	6 1/2	80
5–9	Shakhriyar Mamedyarov (Azerbaijan)	2731	1/2	1/2	1/2	0	1/2	1/2		1/2	1/2	1/2	1/2	1	1/2	1/2	6 1/2	80
5–9	Wang Yue (China)	2736	1/2	0	0	1/2	1/2	1/2	1/2		1/2	1	1/2	1	1/2	1/2	6 1/2	80
5–9	Rustam Kasimdzhanov (Uzbekistan)	2672	0	0	1/2	1/2	1/2	1/2	1/2	1/2		1	0	1/2	1	1	6 1/2	80
10	Ivan Cheparinov (Bulgaria)	2696	1/2	1/2	1/2	1/2	0	1/2	1/2	0	0		1	0	1	1	6	50
11–12	Evgeny Alekseev (Russia)	2715	0	1/2	0	1/2	1/2	1/2	1/2	1/2	1	0		0	1	1/2	5 1/2	35
11–12	Pavel Eljanov (Ukraine)	2720	0	1/2	0	0	1/2	1/2	0	0	1/2	1	1		1/2	1	5 1/2	35
13–14	Vladimir Akopian (Armenia)	2679	1/2	1/2	1/2	1/2	1/2	1/2	1/2	1/2	0	0	0	1/2		1/2	5	15
13–14	Ernesto Inarkiev (Russia)	2669	1	0	1/2	1/2	1/2	1/2	1/2	1/2	0	0	1/2	0	1/2		5	15

=== Nalchik, April 2009 ===
The fourth Grand Prix event began on 14 April and concluded on 29 April. (Elo average 2725, Cat. XX).

The final crosstable was as follows:

	Player	Rating	1	2	3	4	5	6	7	8	9	10	11	12	13	14	Total	Grand Prix points
1	Levon Aronian (Armenia)	2754		1	1	1/2	1/2	1/2	1/2	1/2	0	1/2	1	1	1/2	1	8 1/2	180
2–3	Peter Leko (Hungary)	2751	0		1	1/2	1/2	1/2	1	1/2	1/2	1/2	1/2	1/2	1	1/2	7 1/2	140
2–3	Vladimir Akopian (Armenia)	2696	0	0		1/2	1	1/2	1/2	1	1	1/2	1/2	1/2	1/2	1	7 1/2	140
4–5	Alexander Grischuk (Russia)	2748	1/2	1/2	1/2		1	1	1	0	1/2	1/2	0	0	1	1/2	7	105
4–5	Étienne Bacrot (France)	2728	1/2	1/2	0	0		1	1/2	1/2	1	1/2	1	1/2	1/2	1/2	7	105
6–7	Evgeny Alekseev (Russia)	2716	1/2	1/2	1/2	0	0		1/2	1/2	1	1/2	1/2	1/2	1/2	1	6 1/2	85
6–7	Boris Gelfand (Israel)	2733	1/2	0	1/2	0	1/2	1/2		1/2	1	1/2	1	1/2	1	0	6 1/2	85
8–11	Gata Kamsky (United States)	2720	1/2	1/2	0	1	1/2	1/2	1/2		0	1	1/2	1/2	1/2	0	6	55
8–11	Sergey Karjakin (Ukraine)	2721	1	1/2	0	1/2	0	0	0	1		1	1/2	1/2	1/2	1/2	6	55
8–11	Peter Svidler (Russia)	2726	1/2	1/2	1/2	1/2	1/2	1/2	1/2	0	0		0	1	1/2	1	6	55
8–11	Shakhriyar Mamedyarov (Azerbaijan)	2725	0	1/2	1/2	1	0	1/2	0	1/2	1/2	1		1/2	1/2	1/2	6	55
12–14	Vasyl Ivanchuk (Ukraine)	2746	0	1/2	1/2	1	1/2	1/2	1/2	1/2	1/2	0	1/2		0	1/2	5 1/2	20
12–14	Rustam Kasimdzhanov (Uzbekistan)	2695	1/2	0	1/2	0	1/2	1/2	0	1/2	1/2	1/2	1/2	1		1/2	5 1/2	20
12–14	Pavel Eljanov (Ukraine)	2693	0	1/2	0	1/2	1/2	0	1	1	1/2	0	1/2	1/2	1/2		5 1/2	20

=== Jermuk, August 2009 ===
The fifth Grand Prix event began on 8 August and concluded on 24 August. (Elo average 2719, Cat. XIX).

Aronian took equal second, sufficient for him to win the Grand Prix.

The final crosstable was as follows:

	Player	Rating	1	2	3	4	5	6	7	8	9	10	11	12	13	14	Total	Grand Prix points
1	Vasyl Ivanchuk (Ukraine)	2703		1	1/2	1	1/2	1/2	1/2	1/2	1/2	1/2	1	1/2	1/2	1	8 1/2	180
2–3	Boris Gelfand (Israel)	2755	0		0	1/2	1	1	1/2	1/2	1/2	1/2	1/2	1	1	1	8	140
2–3	Levon Aronian (Armenia)	2768	1/2	1		1	0	1/2	1/2	0	1	1/2	1	1/2	1	1/2	8	140
4–6	Evgeny Alekseev (Russia)	2714	0	1/2	0		1/2	1/2	1/2	1	1	1/2	1/2	1	1	1/2	7 1/2	100
4–6	Rustam Kasimdzhanov (Uzbekistan)	2672	1/2	0	1	1/2		1/2	1/2	1/2	1/2	1/2	1/2	1/2	1	1	7 1/2	100
4–6	Peter Leko (Hungary)	2756	1/2	0	1/2	1/2	1/2		1	1/2	1/2	1/2	1/2	1/2	1	1	7 1/2	100
7	Sergey Karjakin (Ukraine)	2717	1/2	1/2	1/2	1/2	1/2	0		1/2	1/2	1	1/2	1	1/2	1/2	7	80
8	Pavel Eljanov (Ukraine)	2716	1/2	1/2	1	0	1/2	1/2	1/2		0	1/2	1/2	1/2	1/2	1	6 1/2	70
9–10	Gata Kamsky (United States)	2717	1/2	1/2	0	0	1/2	1/2	1/2	1		1/2	0	1/2	1	1/2	6	55
9–10	Étienne Bacrot (France)	2721	1/2	1/2	1/2	1/2	1/2	1/2	0	1/2	1/2		1	1/2	0	1/2	6	55
11–12	Dmitry Jakovenko (Russia)	2760	1/2	1/2	0	1/2	1/2	1/2	1/2	1/2	1	0		1/2	0	0	5	35
11–12	Vladimir Akopian (Armenia)	2712	0	0	1/2	1/2	1/2	1/2	0	1/2	1/2	1/2	1/2		1/2	1/2	5	35
13	Ernesto Inarkiev (Russia)	2675	1/2	0	0	0	0	0	1/2	1/2	0	1	1	1/2		1/2	4 1/2	20
14	Ivan Cheparinov (Bulgaria)	2678	0	0	1/2	0	0	0	1/2	0	1/2	1/2	1	1/2	1/2		4	10

=== Astrakhan, May 2010 ===
The sixth Grand Prix event began on 9 May and concluded on 25 May. (Elo average 2730, Cat. XX).

The final crosstable was as follows:

	Player	Rating	1	2	3	4	5	6	7	8	9	10	11	12	13	14	Total	Grand Prix points
1	Pavel Eljanov (Ukraine)	2751		1/2	1/2	1/2	0	1/2	0	1	1	1	1/2	1/2	1	1	8	180
2–6	Ruslan Ponomariov (Ukraine)	2733	1	1	0	1/2	1/2	1/2		1/2	1/2	1/2	1	1	1/2	1/2	7	116
2–6	Dmitry Jakovenko (Russia)	2725	1/2	1/2		1/2	1/2	1/2	1	1/2	1/2	1/2	1/2	1/2	1/2	1/2	7	116
2–6	Teimour Radjabov (Azerbaijan)	2740	0	1/2	1/2	1	1/2	1/2	1/2	1/2		1/2	1/2	1/2	1/2	1	7	116
2–6	Shakhriyar Mamedyarov (Azerbaijan)	2763	1/2	1/2	1/2		1	0	1/2	1	0	1/2	1/2	1/2	1	1/2	7	116
2–6	Evgeny Alekseev (Russia)	2700	1	1/2	1/2	0		1/2	1/2	0	1/2	1/2	1/2	1/2	1	1	7	116
7–9	Vugar Gashimov (Azerbaijan)	2734	1/2		1/2	1/2	1/2	1/2	0	0	1/2	1/2	1/2	1	1	1/2	6 1/2	70
7–9	Peter Leko (Hungary)	2735	0	1	1/2	0	1	1/2	1/2		1/2	1/2	1/2	1/2	1/2	1/2	6 1/2	70
7–9	Wang Yue (China)	2752	0	1/2	1/2	1/2	1/2	1/2	1/2	1/2	1/2		1/2	1/2	1/2	1	6 1/2	70
10–11	Peter Svidler (Russia)	2735	1/2	1/2	1/2	1/2	1/2	1	0	1/2	1/2	1/2		1/2	0	1/2	6	45
10–11	Boris Gelfand (Israel)	2741	1/2	1/2	1/2	1	1/2		1/2	1/2	1/2	1/2	0	1/2	0	1/2	6	45
12–14	Vassily Ivanchuk (Ukraine)	2741	1/2	0	1/2	1/2	1/2	1/2	0	1/2	1/2	1/2	1/2		0	0	5 1/2	20
12–14	Vladimir Akopian (Armenia)	2694	0	1/2	1/2	1/2	0	1/2	1/2	1/2	0	0	1/2	1	1		5 1/2	20
12–14	Ernesto Inarkiev (Russia)	2669	0	0	1/2	0	0	1	1/2	1/2	1/2	1/2	1	1		0	5 1/2	20

== Grand Prix standings ==
Grand Prix points in bold indicate a tournament win. A number in brackets is a player's worst result of four and doesn't add to the total.

Aronian scored enough points to win the Grand Prix before the last event took place. Hence he decided not to play the last tournament of the Grand Prix.

	Player	Qual.	Baku	Sochi	Elista	Nalchik	Jermuk	Astrakhan	Played	Best 3
1	**Levon Aronian** (ARM)	RL	–	**180**	–	**180**	140	–	3	**500**
2	**Teimour Radjabov** (AZE)	RL	(60)	150	**153 1/3**	–	–	116	4	**419 1/3**
3	**Alexander Grischuk** (RUS)	RR	105	(45)	**153 1/3**	105	–	–	4	363 1/3
4	Dmitry Jakovenko (RUS)	HC	–	90	**153 1/3**	–	(35)	116	4	359 1/3
5	Wang Yue (CHN)	PR	**153 1/3**	120	80	–	–	(70)	4	353 1/3
6	Vugar Gashimov (AZE)	HC	**153 1/3**	(65)	110	–	–	70	4	333 1/3
7	Peter Leko (HUN)	RL	–	–	80	140	100	(70)	4	320
8	Shakhriyar Mamedyarov (AZE)	RL	105	–	80	(55)	–	116	4	301
9	Evgeny Alekseev (RUS)	RR	–	–	(35)	85	100	116	4	301
10	Pavel Eljanov (UKR)	RR	not qualified		35	(20)	70	**180**	4	285
11	Boris Gelfand (ISR)	RL	–	(30)	–	85	140	45	4	270
12	Vasyl Ivanchuk (UKR)	RL	–	65	–	20	**180**	(20)	4	265
13	Étienne Bacrot (FRA)	PR	(15)	–	80	105	55	–	4	240
14	Gata Kamsky (USA)	CH	60	120	–	55	(55)	–	4	235
15	Sergey Karjakin (UKR)	CP	60	90	–	(55)	80	–	4	230
16	Peter Svidler (RUS)	PR	85	90	–	55	–	(45)	4	230
17	Rustam Kasimdjanov (UZB)	RR	not qualified		80	20	100	–	3	200
18	Vladimir Akopian (ARM)	HC	not qualified		(15)	140	35	20	4	195
19	Ivan Cheparinov (BUL)	PR	35	45	50	–	(10)	–	4	130
20	Ruslan Ponomariov (UKR)	RR	not qualified					116	1	116
21	Ernesto Inarkiev (RUS)	HC	15	–	(15)	–	20	20	4	55
–	Magnus Carlsen (NOR)	CP	**153 1/3**	–	withdrew				1	
–	Michael Adams (ENG)	RR	85	–	withdrew				1	
–	David Navara (CZE)	HC	35	15	–	–	excluded		2	
–	Mohamad Al-Modiahki (QAT)	HC	–	15	excluded				1	
–	Yannick Pelletier (SUI)	HC	–	–	excluded				0	

Qual. = Qualification: CH = World Championship, CP = World Cup, RL = rating list, RR = reserve rating list, PR = presidential nominee, HC = host city nominee

Notes: Gata Kamsky was later granted a place in the 2012 Candidates Tournament as runner-up of the 2009 Challenger Match. Boris Gelfand qualified for the Candidates Tournament by winning the Chess World Cup 2009. Magnus Carlsen qualified for the Candidates Tournament by rating (average of July 2009 and January 2010 FIDE rating lists). Later Magnus Carlsen withdrew from the Candidates Tournament, and he was replaced by Alexander Grischuk, who took third place in the Grand Prix. Shakhriyar Mamedyarov was later granted a place in the Candidates Tournament as the organisers' wild card.
