= Draw by agreement =

Chess term whereby the players agree to a draw

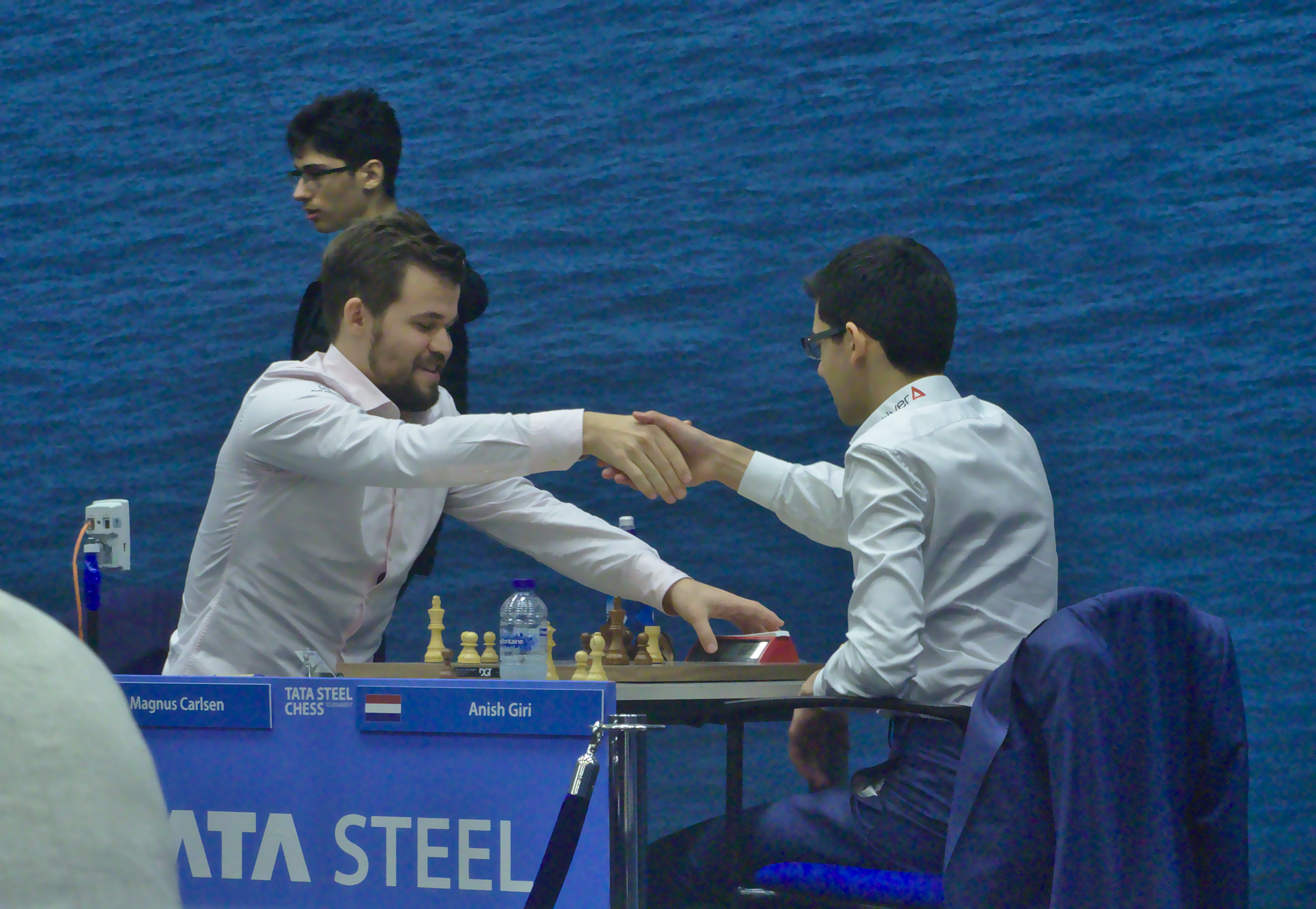
Grandmasters Magnus Carlsen and Anish Giri agreeing to a draw.

A game of chess can end in a draw by agreement. A player may offer a draw at any stage of a game; if the opponent accepts, the game is a draw. In some competitions, draws by agreement are restricted; for example draw offers may be subject to the discretion of the arbiter, or may be forbidden before move 30 or 40, or even forbidden altogether. The majority of draws in chess are by agreement.

Under FIDE rules, a draw should be offered after making the move and before pressing the clock, then marked in the scoresheet as (=). However, draw offers made at any time are valid. If a player offers a draw before making a move, the opponent has the option of requesting a move before deciding whether or not to accept the offer. Once made, a draw offer cannot be retracted and is valid until rejected.

A player may offer a draw by asking, "Would you like a draw?", or similar; the French word remis (literally "reset") is internationally understood as a draw offer and may be used if the players do not share a common language. Players may also offer draws and accept draw offers by merely nodding their heads. A draw may be rejected either verbally or by making a move.

A draw by agreement after less than twenty moves where neither player makes a serious effort to win is colloquially known as a "grandmaster draw". Many chess players and organizers disapprove of grandmaster draws, and efforts have been made to discourage them, such as forbidding draw offers before move 30. However, professional players have defended grandmaster draws, saying they are important to conserve energy during a tournament.

== Etiquette ==
Although a draw may be offered at any time, an illogical offer runs the risk of violating article 11.5, which states: "It is forbidden to distract or annoy the opponent in any manner whatsoever. This includes [...] unreasonable offers of a draw[.]" This rule is applied with the arbiter's discretion; for example, a player loudly offering a draw while the opponent is thinking may well suffer a time penalty or even forfeit the game, but it is unlikely that a player would be penalized for offering a draw in a lifeless position when it is not their turn to move.

At one time, chess players considered it bad manners to play out a superior but theoretically drawn endgame. In such cases, the superior side was expected to offer a draw.

There are certain behavioural norms relating to draw offers not codified in the FIDE Laws of Chess but widely observed. For example, many consider it bad manners for a player who has offered a draw once to do so again before their opponent has offered a draw. Such repeated offers of a draw have also sometimes been considered distracting enough to warrant the arbiter taking action under article 11.5.

Reshevsky vs. Mastichiadis, 1950

Position: c8 black bishop, e8 black rook, g8 black king, b7 black pawn, d7 black knight, e7 black queen, f7 black pawn, c6 black pawn, g6 black pawn, h6 black pawn, b5 white pawn, d5 black pawn, d4 white pawn, g4 black knight, c3 white knight, d3 white bishop, e3 white pawn, f3 white knight, g3 white pawn, b2 white queen, f2 white pawn, g2 white pawn, a1 white rook, g1 white king

Position before 24.Nd2

It is considered bad etiquette to offer a draw in a clearly lost position or even when one has no winning chances but one's opponent does. Garry Kasparov regularly criticizes grandmasters who offer a draw when their position is worse. However, such offers are sometimes used as psychological tricks. The position in the diagram arose in the game Samuel Reshevsky–Fotis Mastichiadis, Dubrovnik 1950. Reshevsky played 24.Nd2?, and saw at once that he would be put into a very bad situation with 24...Nxf2!; after 25. Kxf2 Qxe3+, Black gets his piece back and ultimately wins two pawns with a great positional advantage. Thinking quickly, he offered a draw to his opponent, who was busy writing down the move in his scoresheet. Mastichiadis, a minor master, was so happy to get half a point against his illustrious opponent that he did not pause to examine the position before accepting the offer.

The rule about the procedure of offering a draw was violated in a 1981 game between Garry Kasparov and Anatoly Karpov. Kasparov moved 17. Ra2 and offered a draw. Karpov instantly replied 17... Be7 and then said "Make a move!", which is a violation of the rule. Kasparov moved 18. b5 and then Karpov accepted the draw.

Petrosian vs. Fischer, 1958

Position: g8 black rook, f7 white pawn, g6 white pawn, g5 white king, c3 black pawn, c2 black king

Final position after 67.f7, draw agreed

In the 1958 game between Tigran Petrosian and Bobby Fischer, Fischer offered a draw without making a move first, which was accepted by Petrosian. He explains in his book My 60 Memorable Games:

I offered a draw, not realizing it was bad etiquette. It was Petrosian's place to extend the draw offer after 67...Rxg6+ [...] 68.Kxg6 Kb1 69.f8=Q c2 with a book draw. (See queen versus pawn endgame.)

== Practical considerations ==
Petrosian vs. Korchnoi, 1977, game 12

Position: b8 black queen, b7 black bishop, e7 black king, f7 black pawn, h7 black rook, b6 black pawn, d6 black pawn, g6 black pawn, b5 white pawn, e5 black pawn, c4 white pawn, g4 white pawn, f3 white pawn, d2 white queen, e2 white bishop, g2 white king, a1 white rook

Black is winning but offered a draw.

Players sometimes make draw offers in consideration of outside factors. In 1977 Viktor Korchnoi and former World Champion Tigran Petrosian played a twelve-game quarter-final Candidates Match to ultimately determine the challenger for the 1978 World Championship. After eleven games, Korchnoi was leading by one point, so he only needed a draw in the final game to advance to the semi-finals. Korchnoi, as Black, was winning this game, but he offered a draw after 40 moves. According to Edmar Mednis, it was "gentlemanly and the practical thing to do". Korchnoi went on to unsuccessfully challenge Anatoly Karpov for the World Championship.

Sometimes, time constraints for one or both of the players may be a factor in agreeing to a draw. A player with an advantageous position but limited time may be agreeable to a draw to avoid risking a loss from running out of time, and the opponent may also be agreeable to a draw due to their disadvantageous position.

== Grandmaster draw ==
A grandmaster draw or short draw is a draw reached after very few moves, usually between high-ranked players. British master P. H. Clarke wrote about the positive aspects of a short draw:

Unless you are of the calibre of Botvinnik – and who is – you cannot hope to play at full power day after day. The technical draws are a necessary means of conserving energy. As such, they contribute to raising the standard of play rather than lowering it.

All of the games of the second Piatigorsky Cup were annotated by players, including the short draws. Their comments on two short draws follow (Spassky vs. Petrosian and Reshevsky vs. Portisch), followed by comments on some other short draws.

=== Spassky vs. Petrosian ===
Spassky vs. Petrosian, 1966

Position: e8 black bishop, b7 black pawn, e7 black king, f7 black pawn, h7 black pawn, a6 black pawn, d6 black pawn, f6 black knight, g6 black pawn, c4 white bishop, d4 white knight, e3 white pawn, h3 white pawn, a2 white pawn, b2 white pawn, e2 white king, f2 white pawn, g2 white pawn

Drawn on the 22nd move

Boris Spassky wrote:

The present game once again demonstrates how grandmasters play when they do not care to win. Of course, it is not an interesting spectacle for the onlookers. However, if chess enthusiasts could find themselves in the positions of the grandmasters they would not judge them so severely.

=== Reshevsky vs. Portisch ===
Reshevsky vs. Portisch, 1966

Position: a8 black rook, d8 black queen, f8 black rook, g8 black king, e7 black bishop, f7 black pawn, g7 black pawn, h7 black pawn, c6 black bishop, e6 black pawn, f6 black knight, a5 black pawn, e5 black knight, g5 white bishop, d4 white pawn, c3 white knight, d3 white bishop, b2 white pawn, e2 white queen, f2 white pawn, g2 white pawn, h2 white pawn, a1 white rook, d1 white rook, g1 white king

Drawn after the 16th move

Lajos Portisch wrote:

Here Reshevsky offered me a draw, which was accepted. Is this a grandmaster draw? I do not think so. Reshevsky had consumed most of his time, and had only 30 minutes for the remaining moves. On my part it would have been pointless to rely on his time trouble as I saw that after 17. dxe5 Nd5 18. Bxe7 Qxe7 19. Nxd5 Bxd5 20. Be4, the draw is evident. In such a strong tournament and against such outstanding players it would not be wise to try to win a game of this kind. One could only lose energy. Neither side had any advantage, so why try to force the issue?

=== Averbakh vs. Fischer ===
Averbakh vs. Fischer, 1958

Position: a8 black rook, g8 black king, d7 black knight, f7 black pawn, g7 white pawn, a6 black pawn, d6 black pawn, g6 black pawn, h6 black pawn, c5 black pawn, d5 white pawn, c4 white pawn, e4 black rook, h4 black queen, e3 white bishop, a2 white pawn, b2 black pawn, e2 white bishop, f2 white pawn, b1 white rook, d1 white queen, f1 white king, g1 white rook

Draw agreed after 21.Rb1

In the 1958 game between Yuri Averbakh and Bobby Fischer, the players agreed to a draw in an unclear position where White is a piece ahead. Asked about the draw, the teenage Fischer said, "I was afraid of losing to a Russian grandmaster and he was afraid of losing to a kid." Averbakh stated that Fischer offered the draw and that each player had only about ten minutes to make the 19 or 20 moves before time control.

=== Karpov vs. Kasparov ===
Karpov vs. Kasparov, 1984

Position: a8 black rook, d8 black queen, f8 black rook, g8 black king, a7 black pawn, b7 black bishop, d7 black knight, e7 black bishop, f7 black pawn, g7 black pawn, h7 black pawn, e6 black pawn, f6 black knight, c5 black pawn, a4 white knight, d4 white pawn, a3 white pawn, e3 white pawn, f3 white knight, b2 white bishop, e2 white bishop, f2 white pawn, g2 white pawn, h2 white pawn, a1 white rook, d1 white queen, f1 white rook, g1 white king

Position after 13...c5, draw agreed

Several short draws occurred in the World Chess Championship 1984 between Anatoly Karpov and Garry Kasparov. This one occurred in the 29th game after thirteen moves. Kasparov explains

Draw agreed on Black's proposal: with the resulting complete symmetry, the fighting resources are practically exhausted.

White had used 99 minutes; Black had used 51 minutes.

=== Keres vs. Petrosian ===
Keres vs. Petrosian, 1962

Position: a8 black rook, f8 black rook, g8 black king, b7 black pawn, d7 black queen, e7 black pawn, f7 black pawn, g7 black bishop, h7 black pawn, d6 black knight, g6 black pawn, a5 black pawn, g5 white bishop, b4 white queen, e4 white pawn, c3 white knight, f3 white pawn, a2 white pawn, b2 white pawn, g2 white pawn, h2 white pawn, a1 white rook, e1 white king, h1 white rook

Position after 14...a5, draw agreed

In 1962 a Candidates Tournament was held in Curaçao to determine the challenger to Mikhail Botvinnik in the 1963 World Championship. There is good evidence that Soviet players Tigran Petrosian, Paul Keres, and Efim Geller arranged to draw all of the games between themselves. The twelve games played between these three players were all short draws, averaging 19 moves.

This diagram shows the final position from the shortest one – only fourteen moves were played. This was in the 25th of 28 rounds, and the final game between Keres and Petrosian. Bobby Fischer charged that Petrosian accepted a draw when he was winning and Jan Timman agrees. Petrosian went on to win the tournament and win the championship from Botvinnik.

=== Tal vs. Botvinnik ===
Tal vs. Botvinnik, 1960

Position: d8 black knight, e8 black rook, f8 black rook, g8 black king, a7 black pawn, c7 black pawn, d7 black queen, g7 black pawn, h7 black pawn, b6 black pawn, d6 black pawn, e6 black pawn, f6 black bishop, d5 white pawn, f5 black pawn, c4 white pawn, f4 white knight, b3 white pawn, f3 white queen, g3 white pawn, a2 white pawn, b2 white bishop, e2 white pawn, f2 white pawn, h2 white pawn, d1 white rook, f1 white rook, g1 white king

Position after 17...Nd8, draw

In the 21st of 24 games of the 1960 World Chess Championship between Mikhail Tal and Mikhail Botvinnik, Tal only needed a half point to win the title, so he got to a position where Black had no winning chances, and quickly agreed to a draw.

=== Polugaevsky vs. Tal ===
In the 1967 USSR Championship, Lev Polugaevsky and Mikhail Tal were leading with the same number of points going into the next-to-last round. They played each other that round. After

1. d4 Nf6
2. c4 e6

Polugaevsky offered a draw. Tal explains

I played 2...e6 and Lev offered me a draw. I accepted, although for decency's sake we made a further 12 moves or so, and the question of first place was put off until the last round.

=== Kasparov vs. Karpov ===
Kasparov vs. Karpov, 1986

Position: c8 black rook, d8 black rook, g8 black king, e7 black bishop, f7 black pawn, g7 black pawn, h7 black pawn, b6 black queen, e6 black pawn, f6 black knight, b4 black pawn, d4 white knight, b3 white queen, e3 white pawn, g3 white pawn, b2 white pawn, d2 white rook, f2 white pawn, g2 white bishop, h2 white pawn, a1 white rook, g1 white king

After 21...Qb6, draw agreed

Before the 20th game of the 1986 World Championship, Kasparov had just lost three games in a row, which evened the match score. Kasparov had White in the 20th game, in which a draw was agreed after 21 moves. White had used 1 hour and 11 minutes; Black used 1 hour and 52 minutes. Kasparov writes "In the 20th game we decided in the end 'not to play' (i.e. to aim for a short draw) [...] A typical grandmaster draw, although one can understand the two players – each fulfilled the objective he had set himself before the game." Kasparov did not want to lose a fourth game in a row, and Karpov wanted to draw as Black.

=== Kasparov vs. Smyslov ===
Kasparov had this to say about one of the games of his 1984 match against Vasily Smyslov: "It all ended in a 'planned' draw, and I was not exactly delighted with such a pre-programmed result."

== Steps taken to discourage draws ==
Although many games logically end in a draw after a hard-fought battle between the players, there have been attempts throughout history to discourage or completely disallow draws. Chess is the only widely played sport where the contestants can agree to a draw at any time for any reason.

Because "grandmaster draws" are widely considered unsatisfactory both for spectators (who may only see half-an-hour of play with nothing very interesting happening) and sponsors (who suffer from decreased interest in the media), various measures have been adopted over the years to discourage players from agreeing to draws.

=== Only theoretical draws allowed (Sofia Rules) ===
Chess trainer Mark Dvoretsky, writing in a column for the website Chess Cafe, suggested that agreed draws should not be allowed at all, pointing out that such an agreement cannot be reached in other sports such as boxing. Although some have claimed that outlawing agreed draws entirely requires players to carry on playing in "dead" positions (where no side can reasonably play for a win), Dvoretsky says that this is a small problem and that the effort required to play out these positions until a draw can be claimed by repetition or lack of material, for example, is minimal.

The Sofia 2005 tournament employed a similar rule, which has become known as "Sofia rules". The players could not draw by agreement, but they could have draws by stalemate, threefold repetition, the fifty-move rule, and insufficient material. Other draws are only allowed if the arbiter declares it is a drawn position.

Also known as the "Sofia-Corsica Rules", the anti-draw measure was adopted in the Bilbao Final Masters and the FIDE Grand Prix 2008–2010 (part of the qualifying cycle for the World Chess Championship 2012) did not allow players to offer a draw. The draw had to be claimed with the arbiter, who was assisted by an experienced grandmaster. The following draws were only allowed through the Chief Arbiter:

- Threefold repetition of position
- Fifty-move rule
- Perpetual check
- A theoretical draw

=== No draw offers before a certain move ===
In 1929, the first edition of the FIDE Laws of Chess required thirty moves to be played before a draw by agreement. This rule was discarded when the rules were revised in 1952. In 1954 FIDE rejected a request to reinstate the rule, but it did state that it is unethical and unsportsmanlike to agree to a draw before a serious contest had begun. FIDE stated that the director should discipline players who repeatedly disrespect this guideline, but it seemed to have no effect on players. In 1962 FIDE reinstated a version of the rule against draws by agreement in fewer than thirty moves, with the director allowing them in exceptional circumstances. FIDE had the intention of enforcing the rule and the penalty was a loss of the game by both players. However, players ignored it or got around it by intentional threefold repetition. Directors were unable or unwilling to enforce the rule. In 1963 FIDE made another attempt to strengthen the rule. Draws by agreement before thirty moves were forbidden, and the penalty was forfeit by both players. Directors were to investigate draws by repetition of position to see if they were to circumvent the rule. The rule was dropped in 1964 because it was decided that it had not encouraged aggressive play.

In 2003, GM Maurice Ashley wrote an essay "The End of the Draw Offer?", which raised discussion about ways to avoid quick agreed draws in chess tournaments. Ashley proposed that draw offers not be allowed before move 50.

The 2003 Generation Chess International Tournament in New York City had a rule that draws could not be agreed to before move fifty (draws by other means, such as threefold repetition or stalemate, were permissible at any stage).

In the World Chess Championship 2016 and 2018, the players were not permitted to agree a draw before move 30. In the 2021, 2023 and 2024 championships, this was extended to move 40.

=== Replay the game (gladiator chess) ===
In the very first international round-robin tournament in London in 1862, drawn games had to be replayed until there was a decisive result. A similar format, called gladiator chess, was introduced in the Danish Chess Championships 2006.

Proposed cure for severe acute "drawitis" by FIDE officials Eliminates draws completely by forcing a fast time control game to be played after an accepted draw proposal to ensure there is always a winner and a loser. One potential issue for this proposal is that both players can quickly agree to a draw in the tournament game and then play a speed chess game to decide things. The FIDE 128 player tournament has seen many matches where the two tournament time control games are drawn and advancement is decided by rapid (thirty minutes for a game) or blitz (five minutes) games.

=== Alternative scoring systems ===
==== 3-1-0 scoring system ====
The 3-1-0 scoring system awards three points for a win, one point for a draw, and no points for a loss. This system discourages draws, since draws are worth only two-thirds of their previous value. It was adopted by FIFA for football matches in 1994, after many leagues around the world had used it successfully to reduce the number of stalling draws. FIFA formerly employed the 2-1-0 scoring system, which is equivalent to that used generally in chess today: one point for a win, half a point for a draw, and no points for a loss. A 3-1-0 system was first used in the 2003 Lippstadt chess tournament and again in the 2008 Bilbao chess tournament.

At the 1964 FIDE Congress, the Puerto Rican delegate proposed that a win be given four points, a draw be given two points, a game played and lost one point, and no points for a forfeit. This would be equivalent to a 3-1-0 system with a 1-point penalty for forfeit. This had been suggested previously by Isaac Kashdan but was not implemented.

This system has received some criticism. GM Larry Kaufman points out that the reason for the high draw rate is not one of incentives, but rather the nature of chess as a game: White has a first-move advantage, but it is not enough to win by force. He thus argues that Black should consider a draw to be a good result, and should not be penalised for it: under the 3-1-0 system, Kaufman argues that chess would become like "a game of 'chicken'; who will 'blink' first and play an unsound move to avoid the mutually bad result of a draw?". It has also been pointed out that the 3-1-0 system incentivises players to trade wins with each other instead of agreeing to draws, and gives players an easier time cheating as a team. (A team of players enters an open event; one of them is selected to obtain the maximum score and portion of the prize fund, and the others throw their games to that player; the prize is then shared among the team. This is easier to do when a win earns more points.)

==== BAP scoring system ====
The BAP System was designed to make it undesirable for one or both players to agree to a draw by changing the point value of win/loss/draw based on color played: three points for winning as Black, two points for winning as White, one point for drawing as Black, and no points for drawing as White or for losing as either White or Black.

The BAP System was developed by Clint Ballard, a chess aficionado and software-company president, who named it the Ballard Anti-draw Point system (BAP). Ballard explained the purpose of the BAP System: "The usual flurry of last round draws in almost all tournaments makes chess unmarketable on TV. No excitement, no drama, no TV money for chess. Chess will NEVER succeed in the American TV market until we eliminate the draw as anything other than a very rare outcome. With my anti-draw point system, I am hoping to make 100% of games fighting games with risk and uncertainty, i.e. dramatic potential."

The BAP System was first used in the 2006 Bainbridge Slugfest tournament.

==== Other scoring systems ====
There have been proposals that certain kinds of draws should be worth more points than others. Ed Epp has suggested that draws should be scored as 0.4–0.6 to compensate for White's first-move advantage. Many players, including former world champions Emanuel Lasker and José Raúl Capablanca, have argued that stalemate should be worth more than a normal draw, with three-quarters of a point for a side delivering stalemate (one-quarter of a point going to the side who is stalemated). Kaufman and Arno Nickel have suggested that stalemate and bare king should both be scored as ¾ to the superior side, and that a player who brings about threefold repetition should only be awarded ¼ of a point, citing engine statistics to argue that this would be sufficient to solve the draw death problem (in the trial games simulating human World Championship level, the draw rate was decreased by these rule changes from 65.6% to 22.6%).

=== Financial penalties ===
In the previously mentioned 2003 Generation Chess International Tournament, players agreeing to premature draws were to be fined 10% of their appearance fee and 10% of any prize money won. In a similar vein, the tournament organiser Luis Rentero (best known for organising the very strong tournaments in Linares) has sometimes enforced a rule whereby draws cannot be agreed to before move thirty.

=== Other ===
In 2005, GM John Nunn wrote that he believed the rules did not need to change, and that the simple solution was for organizers to not invite players known for taking short draws.
