= Levon Aronian =

Armenian-American chess grandmaster (born 1982)

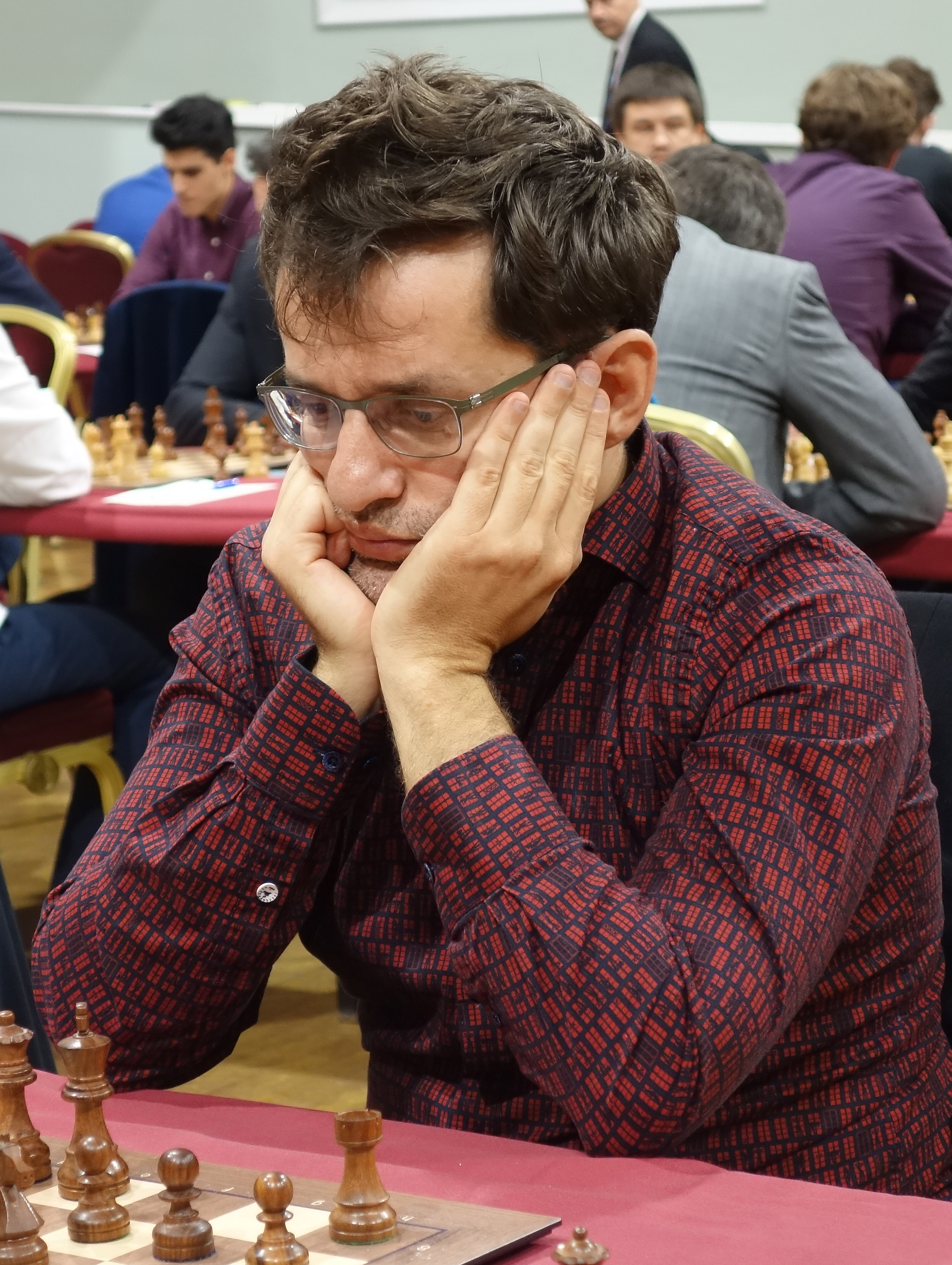
- Aronian in 2023

Personal information
- Born: Levon Grigori Aronian; 6 October 1982 (age 43) Yerevan, Armenian SSR, Soviet Union
- Education: Armenian State Institute of Physical Culture and Sport
- Spouses: Arianne Caoili (m. 2017; died 2020); Anita Ayvazyan (m. 2023)
- Children: 1

Chess career
- Country: Armenia (before 2003; 2004–2021); Germany (2003−2004); United States (since 2021)
- Title: Grandmaster (2000)
- FIDE rating: 2725 (October 2026)
- Peak rating: 2830 (March 2014)
- Ranking: No. 19 (October 2026)
- Peak ranking: No. 2 (January 2012)

Levon Grigori Aronian (Armenian: Լևոն Գրիգորի Արոնյան, romanized: Levon Grigori Aronyan; born 6 October 1982) is an Armenian chess grandmaster who has represented the United States since 2021. A chess prodigy, he earned the title of grandmaster in 2000, at the age of 17. He is a former blitz world champion. His highest classical ranking was No. 2 position in the March 2014 FIDE world chess rankings with a rating of 2830, becoming the fourth highest-rated player in history.

Aronian won the FIDE World Cup in 2005 and 2017. He led the Armenian national team to the gold medals in the Chess Olympiads of 2006 (Turin), 2008 (Dresden) and 2012 (Istanbul) and at the World Team Chess Championship in Ningbo 2011. He won the FIDE Grand Prix 2008–2010, qualifying him for the Candidates Tournament for the World Chess Championship 2012. He was also world champion in Chess960 in 2006 and 2007 and in blitz chess in 2010.

Aronian has been the leading Armenian chess player since the early 2000s. His popularity in Armenia has led to him being called a celebrity and a hero. He was named the best sportsman of Armenia in 2005 and was awarded the title of Honoured Master of Sport of Armenia in 2009. In 2012, he was awarded the Order of St. Mesrop Mashtots. In 2016, CNN called Aronian the "David Beckham of chess".

In late February 2021, Aronian announced his decision to transfer his federation from Armenia to the United States, citing the lack of government support as his primary reason. The transfer was completed in December 2021 and he has since represented the United States.

== Early life and education ==
Aronian was born on 6 October 1982 in Yerevan, Armenia (then part of the Soviet Union), to Seda Avagyan, an Armenian mining engineer, and Grigory Leontievich Aronov, a Russian Jewish physicist from the Vitebsk Region, Belarus. He has said, "I feel much more Armenian than Jewish, although there are sides to me which are more Jewish culturally, involving the arts and music." He was taught to play chess by his sister, Lilit, at the age of nine. His second coach was Grandmaster Melikset Khachiyan. An early sign of his ability came when he won the 1994 World Youth Chess Championship (under-12) in Szeged with 8/9, ahead of future luminaries Étienne Bacrot, Ruslan Ponomariov, Francisco Vallejo Pons, and Alexander Grischuk.

One of Aronian's long-term coaches has been Ashot Nadanian, whom Aronian called "absolutely irreplaceable" in 2011.

Aronian holds a diploma from the Armenian State Institute of Physical Culture.

== Career ==
=== Early years: 2001–2005 ===
In 2001, Aronian scored 7/9 in the Cappelle-la-Grande Open, half a point behind the joint winners Einar Gausel and Vladimir Chuchelov. A few months later, he won the Young Masters tournament at Lausanne.

In 2002, he won the Armenian Chess Championship. In the same year, he became World Junior Champion, scoring 10/13 and finishing ahead of Surya Ganguly, Artyom Timofeev, Luke McShane, Bu Xiangzhi, Pentala Harikrishna, and others.

In 2003, he participated in the first-class four-player round-robin at the Hoogeveen chess tournament where he scored 3/6, behind Judit Polgar, tied with Ivan Sokolov, and ahead of Anatoly Karpov.

Aronian made his debut at the FIDE World Chess Championship in 2004. In the first round, he beat the thirteen-year-old Magnus Carlsen, who also made his debut at the tournament. In the third round he lost to Pavel Smirnov.

=== 2005–2006 ===
By 2005, Aronian had entered the top ten by FIDE Elo rating. In 2005, he was part of a five-way tie for first place at the Gibtelecom Masters in Gibraltar with Zahar Efimenko, Kiril Georgiev, Alexei Shirov and Emil Sutovsky.

During the 12th Russian Team Championship, held in April 2005 in Sochi, Aronian played on board three for Tomsk-400, scoring 7½/9 with a performance rating of around 2850. Tomsk-400 won the championship, and this result also qualified them for the 2005 European Chess Club Cup, which the team also won. During that event, held in Saint-Vincent, Italy, Aronian played on board one and scored 4.5/7.

In October 2005 Aronian also won the Karabakh 2005 International "A" Tournament. In December he beat Ruslan Ponomariov in the final round to win the World Cup in Khanty Mansiysk, Russia.

In March 2006, Aronian won the annual Linares chess tournament, half a point ahead of Teimour Radjabov and then-World Chess Champion Veselin Topalov. In November 2006, he tied for first in the Tal Memorial chess competition. The April–July 2006 FIDE rating list ranked Aronian the third highest rated player in the world. Armenia won its first ever Chess Olympiad at the 37th Chess Olympiad.

=== 2007–2008 ===
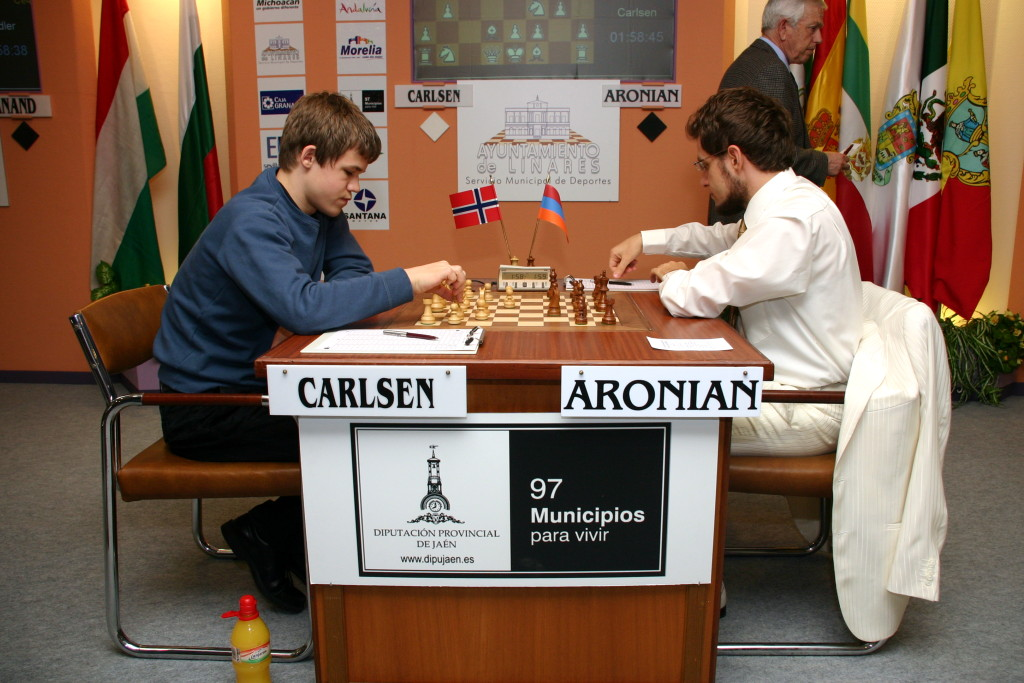
Aronian playing Magnus Carlsen at Linares 2007

In January 2007, Aronian shared first place at the Corus chess tournament in Wijk aan Zee along with Veselin Topalov and Radjabov. All three scored 8.5/13. In May 2007, he defeated World Champion Vladimir Kramnik 4–2 in a rapid chess match.

His 2005 World Cup victory qualified him for the Candidates Tournament of the World Chess Championship 2007, scheduled for May–June 2007. In this tournament he played Magnus Carlsen, and they tied 3–3 in the initial six games, then 2–2 in rapid chess, and finally Aronian won 2–0 in blitz chess. In the finals, he defeated Shirov 3½–2½. This qualified him for the final stage of the championship, which was played in Mexico. There, he scored 6/14, finishing seventh out of eight players.

In January 2008, he won the Corus chess tournament jointly with Magnus Carlsen, scoring 8/13. In March 2008, he won the Melody Amber Blindfold/Rapid tournament held in Nice, France, 2½ points ahead of the nearest competitors. Apart from his first place win in the overall tournament, he also took sole first place in the rapid section of the tournament and shared first place in the Blindfold section with three other chess grandmasters: Kramnik, Morozevich, and Topalov.

In June 2008, Aronian won the Karen Asrian Memorial Rapid chess tournament in Yerevan. At the Second FIDE Grand Prix in Sochi, Aronian defeated Alexander Grischuk in the final and finished at 8½/13 and a performance rating of 2816. Aronian won the 38th Chess Olympiad in Dresden with the Armenia national chess team, winning gold for the second time in a row.

=== 2009–2010 ===
Aronian won the Fourth FIDE Grand Prix in April 2009 with a score of 8½/13, one point ahead of Peter Leko and fellow Armenian Vladimir Akopian. After winning the Bilbao Chess Masters Final in September 2009, his FIDE rating was just four points behind World Champion Viswanathan Anand. In November 2009, he competed in the Mikhail Tal Memorial and finished in fourth place. In December 2009, Aronian was awarded the title of "Honoured Master of Sport of Armenia".

Aronian won the FIDE Grand Prix 2008–2010, qualifying him for the Candidates tournament for the World Chess Championship 2012.

In August 2010, he unsuccessfully defended the World Rapid Chess title, losing to eventual champion Gata Kamsky.

In November 2010, he shared first at the category XXI Tal Memorial. He also won the 2010 World Blitz Chess Championship in Moscow.

=== 2011–2012 ===
In January 2011, he tied for 3rd in the 73rd Tata Steel Chess Tournament. In March 2011, he won the final Melody Amber Blindfold/Rapid tournament for the third time. In November 2011, Aronian played in the Tal Memorial in Moscow in a round robin with ten players. He tied for first with Magnus Carlsen, with both scoring 5½/9.

In January 2012, Aronian won the Tata Steel Chess Tournament with 9/13 and a performance rating of 2891. Following his successful performance, which included wins against Hikaru Nakamura, Fabiano Caruana and Anish Giri, Aronian achieved the then third highest ever Fide rating at 2824.

The Bilbao Chess Masters Final 2012 took place in October, in which Aronian came in third place. In December 2012, Aronian competed in the London Chess Classic, coming in sixth place with one win, 5 draws and 2 losses. Later that month, he won the SportAccord World Mind Games, a blindfold tournament, in Beijing.

=== 2013–2014 ===
In the Tata Steel Chess Tournament in January, Aronian finished second with five wins, one loss and seven draws, in second place behind Carlsen. Aronian finished fourth in the 2013 Candidates Tournament. In the 2013 Alekhine Memorial tournament, Aronian finished first, scoring three wins, one loss and five draws.

Aronian participated in the 2014 Zurich Chess Challenge and tied for second place, along with Fabiano Caruana. He played in the 2014 Candidates Tournament, and finished tied second to last.

=== 2015–2016 ===
In the 2015 Tata Steel Chess Tournament, he scored one win, three losses and nine draws, for 5½/13 points. In February 2015, he played in the Grenke Chess Classic in Baden-Baden Germany, scoring 3½/7 points. Later that month, he played in the Zurich Chess Challenge 2015, winning the Blitz tournament with 4/5 points. He scored 4/10 points in the Classical tournament, and scored 3/5 points in the Rapid tournament. He finished 4th overall in the tournament.

Aronian participated in the Grand Chess Tour, a series of three super tournaments (Norway Chess, Sinquefield Cup, and London Chess Classic) in which players try to accumulate the most Grand Chess Tour points through the three tournaments. In Norway Chess, he scored 3/9 (9th place in the tournament). On 1 September 2015, he won the 3rd Sinquefield Cup, with a +3 score, scoring wins over Fabiano Caruana, Hikaru Nakamura, and Wesley So.

He played in the Chess World Cup 2015, a knockout chess tournament played in Baku, Azerbaijan. This tournament was one of the last remaining qualifiers for the Chess Candidates Tournament 2016 (winner and runner-up will qualify), which determined the challenger to Magnus Carlsen in the World Chess Championship 2016. He was eliminated in Round 2 by Grandmaster Alexander Areschenko. However, he was selected as organizer's nominee to play in the 2016 Candidates Tournament by Armenian businessman Samvel Karapetyan.

In October 2015, he participated in the World Rapid and Blitz Championship in Berlin, Germany. In the Rapid Championship, he placed 43rd overall, scoring 8½/15 points. In the Blitz, he placed 11th overall, scoring 13½/21 points. Aronian won the 2015 European Chess Club Cup with Team Siberia Novosibirsk, which featured Kramnik, Grischuk, Li Chao, Wang Yue, Korobov, Kokarev, and Bocharov.

In December 2015, Aronian played in the final leg of the Grand Chess Tour, the London Chess Classic. In this tournament, he scored 5/9, with one victory against Veselin Topalov. Overall, he scored 22 Grand Tour Points out of 39 to earn himself a spot in the top 3 of the overall Tour standings, securing an invitation in the next Grand Chess Tour.

=== 2017–2018 ===
In April 2017, Aronian won the Grenke Chess Classic in Baden-Baden, Germany. In the 7-round tournament, he scored 5½ points, 1½ points ahead of Magnus Carlsen and Fabiano Caruana.

On 16 June 2017, Aronian won the fifth edition of the Norway Chess Tournament (with a PR of 2918, and a full point ahead of nearest rivals), beating Magnus Carlsen, Vladimir Kramnik and Sergey Karjakin. In August 2017, Aronian placed joint-fourth out of ten players in the fifth edition of the Sinquefield Cup with a score of 5/9. On 18 August 2017, Aronian won the Saint Louis Rapid & Blitz with a score of 24½/36.

In September 2017, Aronian won the World Cup, and in doing so qualified for the Candidates Tournament for the 2018 World Chess Championship. In November 2017, Aronian won the gold medal for individual performance in the European Team Chess Championship. In the same month, he tied for first with Dmitry Jakovenko in the FIDE Grand Prix in Palma de Mallorca. In December 2017, Aronian took fifth place in the World Blitz Chess Championship in Riyadh, Saudi Arabia, with a score of 14/21 including wins over Maxime Vachier-Lagrave and defending champion Sergey Karjakin.

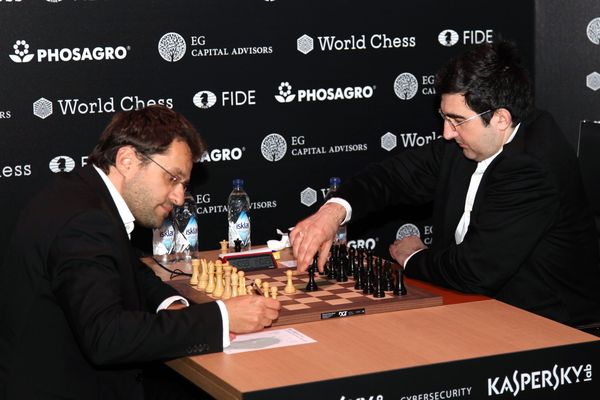
Aronian playing Vladimir Kramnik at the Candidates Tournament 2018

In January 2018, Aronian won the 16th Annual Gibraltar Chess Festival on tiebreaks, beating runner-up Maxime Vachier-Lagrave 2½–1½, with an overall record of 7½/10. From 31 March to 9 April 2018, Aronian competed in the 5th Grenke Chess Classic. He finished fifth with a score of 5/9. From 28 May to 7 June, he competed in the sixth edition of Norway Chess, placing sixth with 4/8 points.

In August, he competed in the 6th Sinquefield Cup. He tied for first with Carlsen and Caruana on 5½/9, and jointly won the tournament after the trio decided to share the title.

=== 2019 ===
In August 2019, for the second time, Aronian won the Saint Louis Rapid & Blitz tournament. He scored 22/36, with 13 points from the Rapid section and 9 points from the Blitz section. He reached the quarter finals in the Chess World Cup 2019 held in Khanty-Mansiysk. On 10 November, he won the Superbet Rapid & Blitz tournament held in Bucharest.

=== 2020 ===
From 11 to 13 September, Aronian participated in the Chess 9LX 2020 Champions Showdown, where he obtained third place with 5.5/9 points, half a point behind joint leaders Hikaru Nakamura and Magnus Carlsen.

From 5 to 16 October, Aronian participated in the 8th Altibox Norway Chess. He scored a total of 17.5 points, which earned him 3rd place.

=== 2021 ===
In February 2021, Aronian announced, in a press release from the Saint Louis Chess Club, that he would be switching federations from Armenia to the United States of America on the basis, among other things, of "the state's absolute indifference towards Armenian chess" and the ongoing war between Armenia and Azerbaijan over Nagorno-Karabakh. Aronian's official statement regarding this transfer is available on his official Facebook page. By the FIDE rating list at the time of the announcement, in which Aronian was the world number 5, that would make Aronian the US number 2. He left for the US in September 2021.

On July 4, Aronian won the Goldmoney Asian Rapid chess tournament, beating Vladislav Artemiev in the finals 2–0. Aronian's prize was $30,000.

On 20 and 21 November, Aronian played in the blitz portion of the Tata Steel India Chess Tournament. He clinched first place by defeating GM Arjun Erigaisi in the Armaggedon.

From 26 to 28 December 2021, Aronian participated in the 2021 FIDE World Rapid Championship, where he ended up in seventh place with 9/13 points after tiebreaks.

He also participated in the World Blitz Chess Championship from 29 to 30 December, where he scored 14/21 points to obtain 5th place.

=== 2022–2024 ===
Through February and March 2022, Aronian played in the FIDE Grand Prix 2022. In the first leg, he placed first in Pool C with a 4.5/6 result and defeated Leinier Domínguez in the semifinals 1.5/2. He lost to Hikaru Nakamura in the finals with a 1/4 result in classical and rapid time formats. In the third leg, he finished third in Pool A with a result of 3/6, finishing fourth in the standings with 12 points.

In April 2022 he was a participant in the American Cup, winning the elimination bracket and finishing 2nd behind Fabiano Caruana.

In May 2022 he tied for first in the Superbet Chess Classic, losing in tiebreaks to Maxime Vachier-Lagrave, and Wesley So. The same month, Aronian tied for second in the Superbet Rapid and Blitz Poland and became the number one ranked Blitz player in the world with a rating of 2850.

In July 2022, he won the FTX Road to Miami online event, qualifying him for the FTX Crypto Cup.

During August–November 2022, he heavily struggled in tournaments, losing 40 points between August and November.

In January 2023, he played in the Tata Steel Chess tournament, scoring 6.5/13.

In February 2023 he won the WR Chess Masters in Düsseldorf after winning playoffs against Ian Nepomniachtchi and Dommaraju Gukesh.

During June–July 2023, he was a part of the team Triveni Continental Kings, winning the inaugural Global Chess League in Dubai. In March 2024, he won The American Cup in St. Louis, MO.

=== 2025 ===
Aronian finished 4th in Superbet Rapid & Blitz Poland, scoring 20 points.

In June, Aronian played board 1 for the Hexamind Chess Team, at the World Rapid and Blitz Team Chess Championships 2025, The team won Silver at the Rapid event and Bronze at the Blitz event.

In July 2025, Aronian won the Freestyle Chess Grand Slam in Las Vegas against earning $200,000. In December 2025, he followed it up by winning the Freestyle Chess Grand Slam Final in Cape Town, South Africa. He beat Magnus Carlsen 1½-½ in the final, earning him another $200,000 plus $50,000 for finishing second on the Tour.

In August, Aronian won the Saint Louis Rapid & Blitz with 24.5 points.

Aronian participated in the finals of Grand Chess Tour 2025, He lost in the semifinals to Fabiano Caruana and won the 3rd place match against Praggnanandhaa R.

=== 2026 ===
In June, Aronian played board 2 for the Hexamind Chess Team at the World Rapid and Blitz Team Chess Championships 2026, The team won Bronze at the Rapid event.

In July, Aronian won the Masters section of Biel Chess Festival, scoring (+4-0=1) in Rapid, (+8-1=1) in blitz, and a combined (+0-0=8) in the two Classical sections.

== Team competitions ==
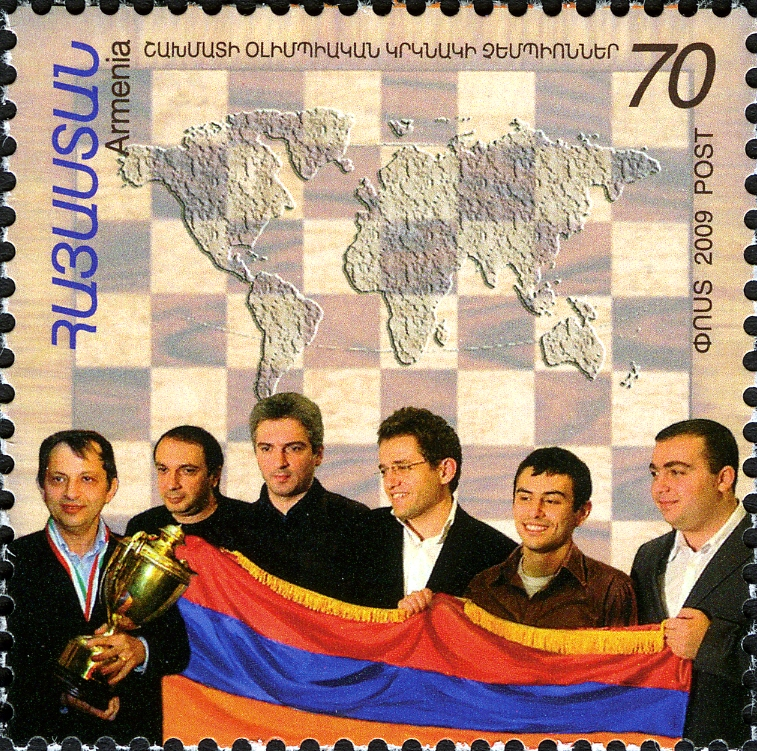
Levon Aronian (3rd right) with his 2008 Olympiad teammates on a 2009 stamp of Armenia

Aronian represented Armenia in the Chess Olympiads of 1996, 2004, 2006, 2008, 2010, and 2012. He took team bronze medal in 2004 and team gold medal in 2006, 2008 and 2012. In the 2010 Chess Olympiad he won the silver medal for his individual performance on board one. In the 2012 Chess Olympiad Aronian won the gold medal on board one. Aronian was a member of the gold medal-winning Armenian team at the World Team Chess Championship in 2011, where he won the silver medal on board one. Aronian competed for Armenia in the 2013 World Team Chess Championship, where he won the gold medal on board one. In 2024 Aronian competed for the US in the chess olympiad and won a silver medal for his performance on board 4.

Medal record

Representing Armenia

Chess Olympiad
| Gold medal – first place | Turin 2006 | Open |
| Gold medal – first place | Dresden 2008 | Open |
| Gold medal – first place | Istanbul 2012 | Open |
| Bronze medal – third place | Calvià 2004 | Open |

== Elo rating ==
Aronian broke the 2800 rating barrier in the November 2010 FIDE world ranking with a rating of 2801. He is the sixth player to cross the 2800 rating mark, after Garry Kasparov, Vladimir Kramnik, Viswanathan Anand, Veselin Topalov, and Magnus Carlsen. In March 2014 he reached a personal rating record of 2830, which is the fourth-highest rating ever attained, behind Carlsen, Kasparov, and Caruana.

== Chess960 ==
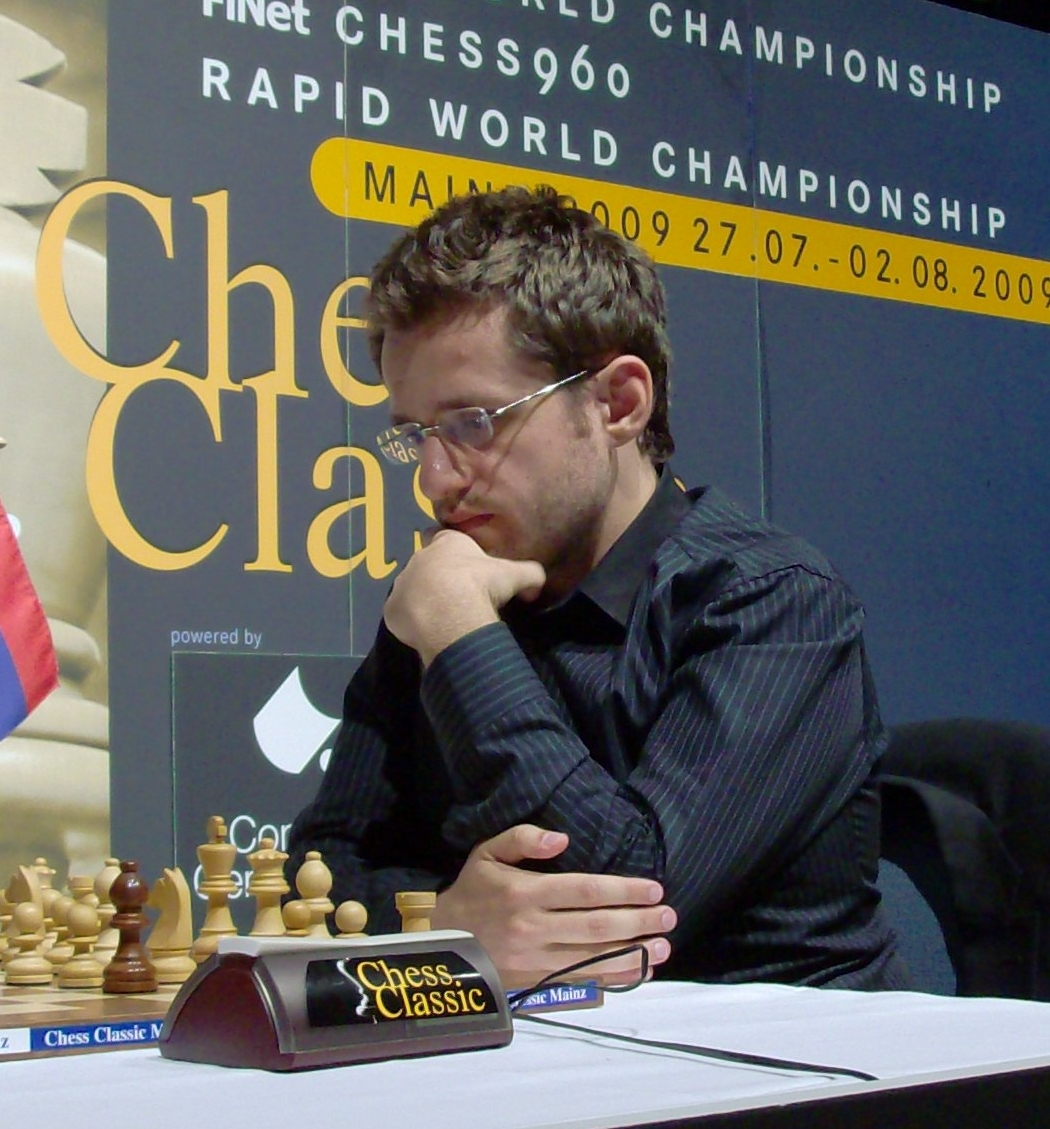
Aronian at Mainz 2009

In 2003 Aronian won the Finet Chess960 open at Mainz; this qualified him for a match against Chess960 World Champion Peter Svidler at Mainz the following year, a match which he lost 4½–3½. He won the Finet Chess960 open tournament again in 2005 which earned him a rematch with Svidler in 2006, and won the match this time 5–3 to become Chess960 World Champion.

In 2007, he successfully defended his title of Chess960 World Champion by beating Viswanathan Anand. He lost the title in 2009 to Hikaru Nakamura.

In 2019 Aronian participated in the Chess960 event The Champions Showdown 9LX. There he faced Hikaru Nakamura in a series of 6 rapid and 14 blitz games. Despite gaining a lead early on, at one point leading with the score 7½–½, he ended up losing 11½–14½.

In 2025, Aronian competed in the final leg of the inaugural Freestyle Chess Grand Slam Tour, held in Las Vegas. After tying with Magnus Carlsen in the round-robin rapid stage, he won a blitz tiebreak to qualify for the knockout rounds. He then defeated Hikaru Nakamura 2½–1½ in the quarterfinals, swept Arjun Erigaisi 2–0 in the semifinals, and beat Hans Niemann 1½–½ in the final to win the tournament. This marked Aronian's first Grand Slam title in Chess960 since Mainz 2006, earning him $200,000 in prize money and finishing fifth in the overall tour standings. He followed it up with a win at the Freestyle Chess Grand Slam Final in Cape Town, South Africa, finishing unbeaten and beating Magnus Carlsen 1½–½ in the final earning him $200,000. This took him to finishing second on the tour behind Carlsen earning him a further $50,000 prize money.

== Playing style ==
Viswanathan Anand called Aronian "a very gifted tactician", and said that "He's always looking for various little tricks to solve technical tasks." In 2011, Boris Gelfand described Aronian as "the most striking player around, with the highest creative level, in terms both of openings and original ideas in the middlegame."

In a 2010 conference, Alexei Shirov said: "Levon Aronian is the most successful player with an ultra-aggressive style. He achieves this result thanks to his rare intuition in the sharpest positions." In 2012, Sergey Karjakin, speaking about Aronian's style, made an analogy with football and compared him with Lionel Messi.

As white, Aronian plays mainly 1. d4. According to Anand, "Though he opens with 1. d4, he treats these positions like an e4-player." Aronian is an expert in the Marshall Attack.

== Chess school ==
In 2012, with Gabriel Sargissian, Aronian founded a chess school in Yerevan, where the most talented chess players between the ages of 10 and 18 can study.

== Personal life ==
Aronian speaking in 2019
Levon Aronian describing in an interview a time he was recognized in public

Aronian's mother, Seda Aronova, published a book about her son on 22 November 2013, recounting her memories of his childhood and accomplishments.

He is a jazz fan. His favorite musician is John Coltrane. His favorite classical composers include Bach, Bruckner, Mahler, and Shostakovich.

Aronian started dating Filipino-Australian Woman International Master Arianne Caoili in 2008. The two announced their engagement in February 2015, and were married on 30 September 2017 in Yerevan. They first met at the 1996 World Youth Chess Championships in Las Palmas; they were reintroduced in 2006 by their mutual friend, International Master Alex Wohl. Caoili died on 30 March 2020 as a result of injuries sustained in a road accident two weeks prior.

In 2021, Aronian moved to the United States; he currently resides in St. Louis, Missouri.

In 2023, Aronian married Anita Ayvazyan, an international literature major at the American University of Armenia. They had a daughter in 2022 whom they named Zabelle.

== See also ==
- Comparison of top chess players throughout history
- List of chess players by peak FIDE rating

Achievements
| Preceded by Viswanathan Anand | World Rapid Chess Champion; 2009 | Succeeded by Gata Kamsky |
| Preceded by Magnus Carlsen | World Blitz Chess Champion; 2010 | Succeeded by Alexander Grischuk |
