= Magnus Carlsen =

Norwegian chess grandmaster (born 1990)

- Carlsen in 2023

Personal information
- Born: Sven Magnus Øen Carlsen; 30 November 1990 (age 35) Tønsberg, Norway
- Spouse: Ella Victoria Malone (m. 2025)
- Children: 1

Chess career
- Country: Norway
- Title: Grandmaster (2004)
- World Champion: 2013–2023
- FIDE rating: 2823 (November 2026)
- Peak rating: 2882 (May 2014)
- Ranking: No. 1 (November 2026)
- Peak ranking: No. 1 (January 2010)

Sven Magnus Øen Carlsen (Note: Norwegian pronunciation: [svɛn ˈmɑ̀ŋnʉs øːn ˈkɑːɭsn̩]) (born 30 November 1990) is a Norwegian chess grandmaster. Carlsen is a five-time World Chess Champion, reigning six-time World Rapid Chess Champion, reigning nine-time World Blitz Chess Champion and the reigning FIDE Freestyle Chess World Champion. Carlsen has held the No. 1 position in the FIDE rankings since 1 July 2011, the longest consecutive period, and trails only Garry Kasparov in time spent as the highest-rated player in the world. His peak Elo rating of 2882 is the highest rating achieved since FIDE adopted the system in 1970. He also holds the record for the longest unbeaten streak at the elite level in classical chess at 125 games.

A chess prodigy, Carlsen earned the title of grandmaster at age 13, at the time becoming the second-youngest grandmaster in history. Two years later, he won his first Norwegian Chess Championship. At 17, he achieved his first victory in an elite tournament, finishing joint first in the top group of Corus. He surpassed a rating of 2800 at 18, the youngest at the time to do so, after winning the 2009 Pearl Spring Chess Tournament with a performance rating of 3002. In 2010, at 19, Carlsen reached the No. 1 position in the FIDE world rankings, the youngest person ever to do so.

Carlsen became World Chess Champion in 2013 by defeating Viswanathan Anand. He retained his title against Anand the following year and won both the 2014 World Rapid Championship and World Blitz Championship, becoming the first player to hold all three titles simultaneously, a feat which he repeated in 2019 and 2022. No other player has achieved the World Rapid and World Blitz double, which Carlsen achieved five times. He defended his classical world title against Sergey Karjakin in 2016, Fabiano Caruana in 2018, and Ian Nepomniachtchi in 2021. He declined to defend his title in 2023, citing a lack of motivation. In 2023, he won his first Chess World Cup. He has also won every single edition of the Champions Chess Tour and its successor, the Esports World Cup, from 2020 through 2026.

Known for his attacking style as a teenager, Carlsen has since developed into a universal player. He uses a variety of openings to make it harder for opponents to prepare against him and reduce the utility of pre-game computer analysis. In particular, Carlsen has been praised for his endgame play and exceptional ability to outplay his opponents in equal positions.

== Childhood ==
Carlsen was born in Tønsberg, Norway, on 30 November 1990 to Sigrun Øen (1963–2024), a chemical engineer, and Henrik Albert Carlsen (1959), an IT consultant. The family spent one year in Espoo, Finland, and then in Brussels, Belgium, before returning to Norway in 1998, where they lived in Lommedalen, Bærum. They later moved to Haslum. Carlsen showed an aptitude for intellectual challenges at a young age. At two years, he could solve 50-piece jigsaw puzzles; at four, he enjoyed assembling Lego sets with instructions intended for children aged 10–14.

His father, a keen amateur chess player, taught him to play at the age of five, although he initially showed little interest in it. Magnus has three sisters; he has said his original motivation to study chess seriously was a desire to be able to beat his elder sister.

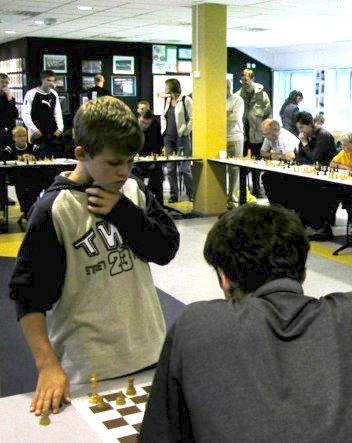
Carlsen, aged 13, in Molde giving a simultaneous exhibition, July 2004

Carlsen developed his early chess skills by playing alone. Carlsen had an exceptional memory and could recall the locations, populations, flags and capitals of all the countries in the world by the age of five. He participated in his first tournament—the youngest division of the 1999 Norwegian Chess Championship—at 8 years and 7 months, and scored 6/11.

Carlsen was coached at the Norwegian College of Elite Sport by the country's top player, Simen Agdestein, who in turn cites Norwegian football manager Egil Olsen as a key inspiration for his coaching strategy.

Over the course of that year, Carlsen's rating rose from 904 in June 2000 to 1907. His breakthrough occurred in the Norwegian junior teams championship in September 2000, where he scored 3½/5 against the country's top junior players and gained a tournament performance rating (TPR) of around 2000. Apart from chess, which he studied about three to four hours a day, his favourite pastimes included playing football and reading Donald Duck comics. He also practised skiing until the age of ten.

From autumn 2000 to the end of 2002, Carlsen played almost 300 rated tournament games, as well as in several blitz tournaments, and participated in other minor events. In October 2002, he placed sixth in the European Under-12 Championship in Peñiscola. The following month, he tied for first place in the 2002 World Under-12 Championship in Heraklion, placing second to Ian Nepomniachtchi on tiebreak. He then obtained three IM norms in relatively quick succession: the first at the January 2003 Gausdal Troll Masters (score 7/10, 2453 PR); the second at the June 2003 Salongernas IM-tournament in Stockholm (6/9, 2470 PR); and the third at the July 2003 Politiken Cup in Copenhagen (8/11, 2503 PR). He was officially awarded the IM title on 20 August 2003.

After finishing primary school, Carlsen took a year off to participate in international chess tournaments in Europe during the autumn of 2003, then returned to complete secondary education at a sports school. During the year away from school, he placed joint-third in the European Under-14 Championship and ninth in the 2003 World Under-14 Championship.

== Chess career ==
=== 2004 ===
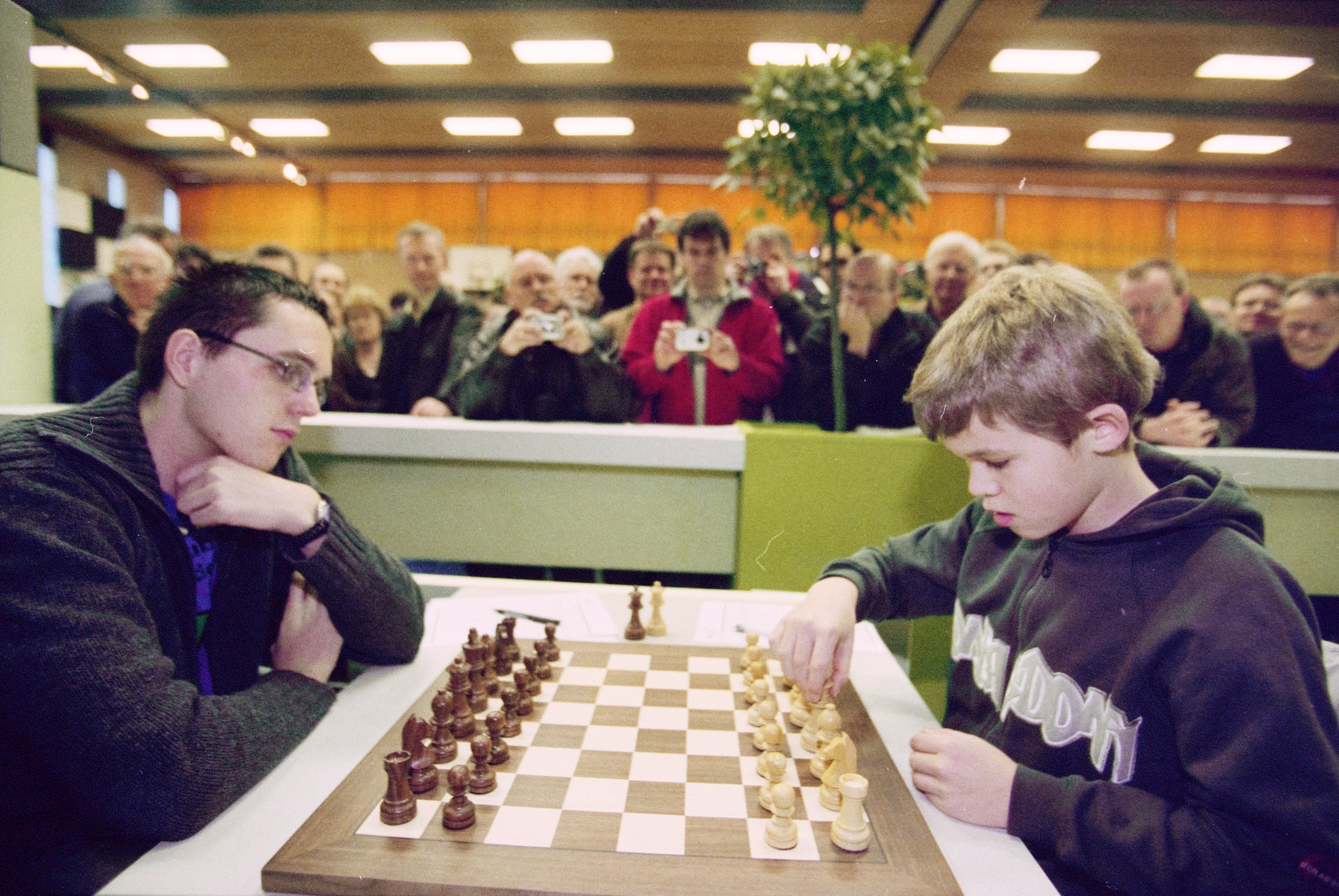
Carlsen vs. Ernst, 2004

At age 13, Carlsen made headlines after his victory in the C group of the Corus Chess Tournament 2004 at Wijk aan Zee, having lost only one game to the section's top seed, Duško Pavasovič. As a result hr earned his first GM norm, was dubbed "the Mozart of chess" by GM Lubomir Kavalek, and became sponsored by Microsoft.

Carlsen obtained his second GM norm at the Moscow Aeroflot Open in February. And his third at the Dubai Open Chess Championship in April, making him the world's youngest GM at the time and the second-youngest GM in history at the time (after Sergey Karjakin, who earned the title at 12 years and 7 months). On 17 March, in a blitz chess tournament in Reykjavík, Iceland, he defeated former World Champion Anatoly Karpov. In the rapid knockout tournament the next day, he drew a game with Garry Kasparov, then the top-rated player in the world, but lost the followup.

In July, Carlsen and Berge Østenstad, then the reigning Norwegian champion, tied for first in the Norwegian Chess Championship. Østenstad eventually won in the tiebreaks.

=== 2005–2009 ===
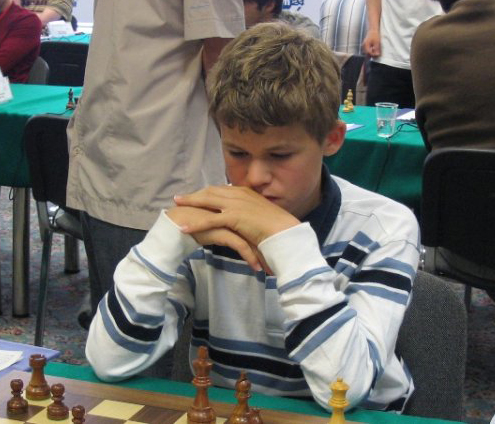
Carlsen in Warsaw, 2005

Carlsen played in the B group of the Corus Chess Tournament 2005, and 2006 and the A group in 2007, 2008, and 2009. He finished in seventh, shared first (with Alexander Motylev), last, shared first (with Levon Aronian), and shared fifth respectively. In the 2005 and 2006 Norwegian Chess Championships, Carlsen placed second and first respectively, first losing to and then beating his mentor Simen Agdestein on tiebreaks.

In the semi-finals of the Ciudad de León rapid chess tournament in June 2005, Carlsen played a four-game match against reigning World Rapid Champion and World No. 2 Viswanathan Anand, losing 3–1. In October 2005, Carlsen took first place at the Arnold Eikrem Memorial in Gausdal. At the end of 2005, Carlsen finished tenth in the Chess World Cup in Khanty-Mansiysk, Russia, making him the youngest player to be an official World Championship Candidate. (Note: This record is extremely misleading: the Candidates tournament that Carlsen qualified for was a 16-player tournament where the top four finishers advanced to the 8-player 2007 World Championship tournament. The previous record-holder, Bobby Fischer, qualified for an 8-player Candidates tournament (1959), where the winner would become the challenger for the World Championship match.)

In 2006, Carlsen shared first place in the international 'Bosna' tournament in Sarajevo with Liviu-Dieter Nisipeanu (who won on tiebreak) and Vladimir Malakhov. Carlsen won the Glitnir Blitz Tournament in Iceland and scored 6/8 in the 37th Chess Olympiad, achieving a PR of 2820. In the Midnight Sun Chess Tournament in Tromsø, Carlsen finished second to Sergei Shipov. In the Biel Grandmaster Tournament, he placed second, beating the tournament winner Alexander Morozevich twice. In the NH Chess Tournament held in Amsterdam in August, Carlsen participated in an "Experience" vs. "Rising Stars" Scheveningen team match. The "Rising Stars" won the match, with Carlsen achieving the best individual score for the Rising Stars team and a 2700 PR, thus winning the right to participate in the 2007 Melody Amber tournament. In September, Carlsen placed 8th out of 16 participants at the World Blitz Championship in Rishon LeZion, Israel. In the rapid chess tournament Rencontres nationales et internationales d'échecs in Cap d'Agde, France, he reached the semi-final, losing there to Sergey Karjakin. In November, Carlsen achieved a shared 8th place of 10 participants in the Mikhail Tal Memorial in Moscow with two losses and seven draws. He finished ninth in a group of 18 participants in the associated blitz tournament.

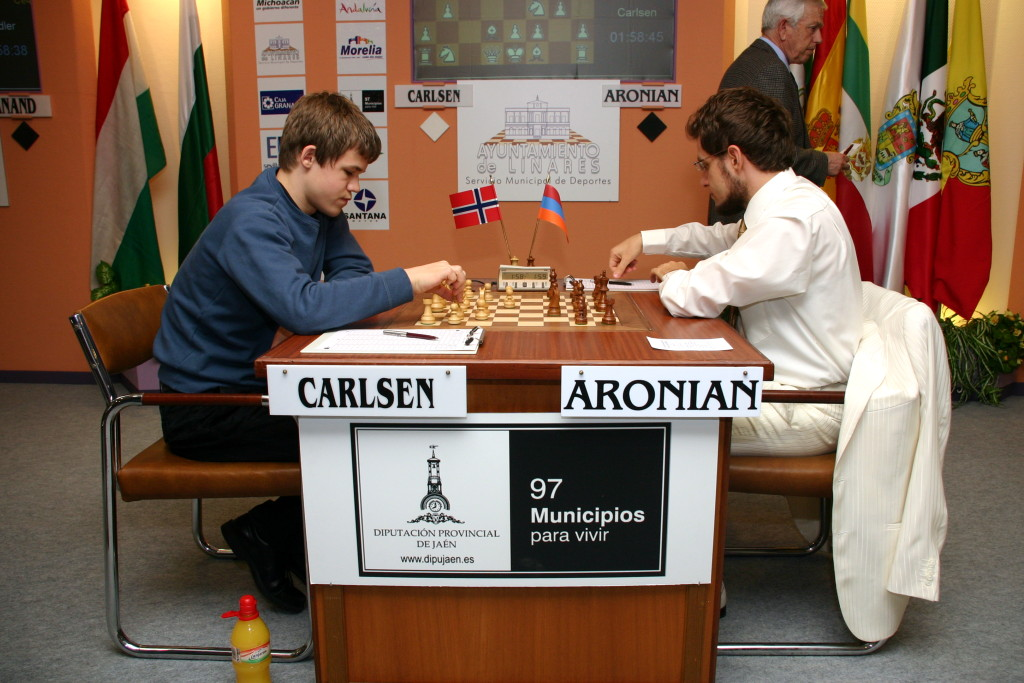
Carlsen playing Levon Aronian at Linares 2007

In the 2007, 2008, and 2009 Linares International Chess Tournaments, Carlsen finished in shared second, second, and third respectively. In the 2007 and 2008 Melody Amber blind and rapid tournaments, he finished in shared eighth and shared second respectively.

In May and June 2007, Carlsen drew against Aronian in the Candidates Tournament for the FIDE World Chess Championship, though Aronian won both tiebreak blitz games. In July and August, Carlsen won the Biel Grandmaster Tournament after a tie-breaking armageddon match against Alexander Onischuk. He entered the open Arctic Chess Challenge afterwards, but his fourth-place result was a slight underperformance in terms of rating. A game which attracted some attention was his sixth-round win over his father, Henrik Carlsen. He reached the semi-final round of the World Chess Cup in December, after defeating Michael Adams and Ivan Cheparinov, but was eliminated by eventual winner, Gata Kamsky.

Carlsen tied for first in the FIDE Grand Prix 2008–2010, a qualifier for the World Chess Championship 2012, but later withdrew from the Grand Prix cycle, criticising FIDE for "changing the rules dramatically in the middle of a World Championship cycle".

In June 2008, Carlsen won a rapid match against Peter Leko held in Miskolc, Hungary and won the annual Aerosvit chess tournament, finishing undefeated and achieving a PR of 2877, his best PR at that point in his career. In August, he finished third in the category 18 Biel Grandmaster Tournament. He finished second behind Anand the Mainz World Rapid Chess Championship that same month.

In early 2009, Carlsen hired Kasparov as a personal trainer, though this was not known by the public until September. In May, he tied for second place with Veselin Topalov, the world's highest-rated player at the time, at the M-Tel Masters (category 21) tournament in Sofia, Bulgaria. He lost to eventual winner Alexei Shirov in their final game, dropping him from first. In October, he won the category 21 Nanjing Pearl Spring tournament against Topalov, achieving a PR of 3002, one of the best in history. Chess statistician Jeff Sonas declared it one of the 20 best tournament performances of all time, and the best chess performance of all time by a teenager. As a result, he became the youngest ever player at the time to pass 2800 in rating. In November, he finished shared second (with Vasyl Ivanchuk behind Vladimir Kramnik) in the Tal Memorial and first in the World Blitz Championship. Carlsen won the London Chess Classic in December, propelling him to No. 1 on the FIDE rating list, surpassing Topalov at age 20.

Carlsen qualified for the Candidates Tournament that would determine the challenger to World Champion Anand in 2012, but withdrew after describing the 2008–12 cycle as "[not] sufficiently modern and fair". He wrote that "Reigning champion privileges, the long (five-year) span of the cycle, changes made during the cycle resulting in a new format (Candidates) that no World Champion has had to go through since Kasparov, puzzling ranking criteria as well as the shallow ceaseless match-after-match concept are all less than satisfactory in my opinion."

=== 2010 ===
Carlsen won the 72nd Corus chess tournament in January, after a streak of 36 rated games undefeated.

In March it was announced that Carlsen had split from Kasparov and would no longer use him as a trainer, although Carlsen later stated that they would remain in contact and he would continue to attend training sessions with Kasparov.

Carlsen shared first place alongside Ivanchuk in the Amber blindfold and rapid tournament. He helped Anand prepare for the World Championship 2010 against Veselin Topalov, which Anand won to retain the title. Carlsen had earlier helped Anand prepare for his World Championships in 2007 and 2008.

Carlsen won the Bazna Kings Tournament in Romania in June, beating Teimour Radjabov and Boris Gelfand and the Arctic Securities Chess Stars tournament in Norway in June, beating Anand.

Carlsen suffered setbacks in his next two tournaments, losing three games in the 39th Chess Olympiad to Baadur Jobava, Michael Adams, and Sanan Sjugirov. His team, Norway, finished 51st out of 149 teams.

Carlsen finished third in the Grand Slam Masters Final in October. The average Elo of the participants was 2789, making it the strongest chess tournament in history. He then won first place at the Pearl Spring chess tournament in Nanjing, China. This was the only tournament in 2010 to feature Anand, Carlsen and Topalov, at the time the top three players in the world, and was the first tournament in history to feature three players rated at least 2800.

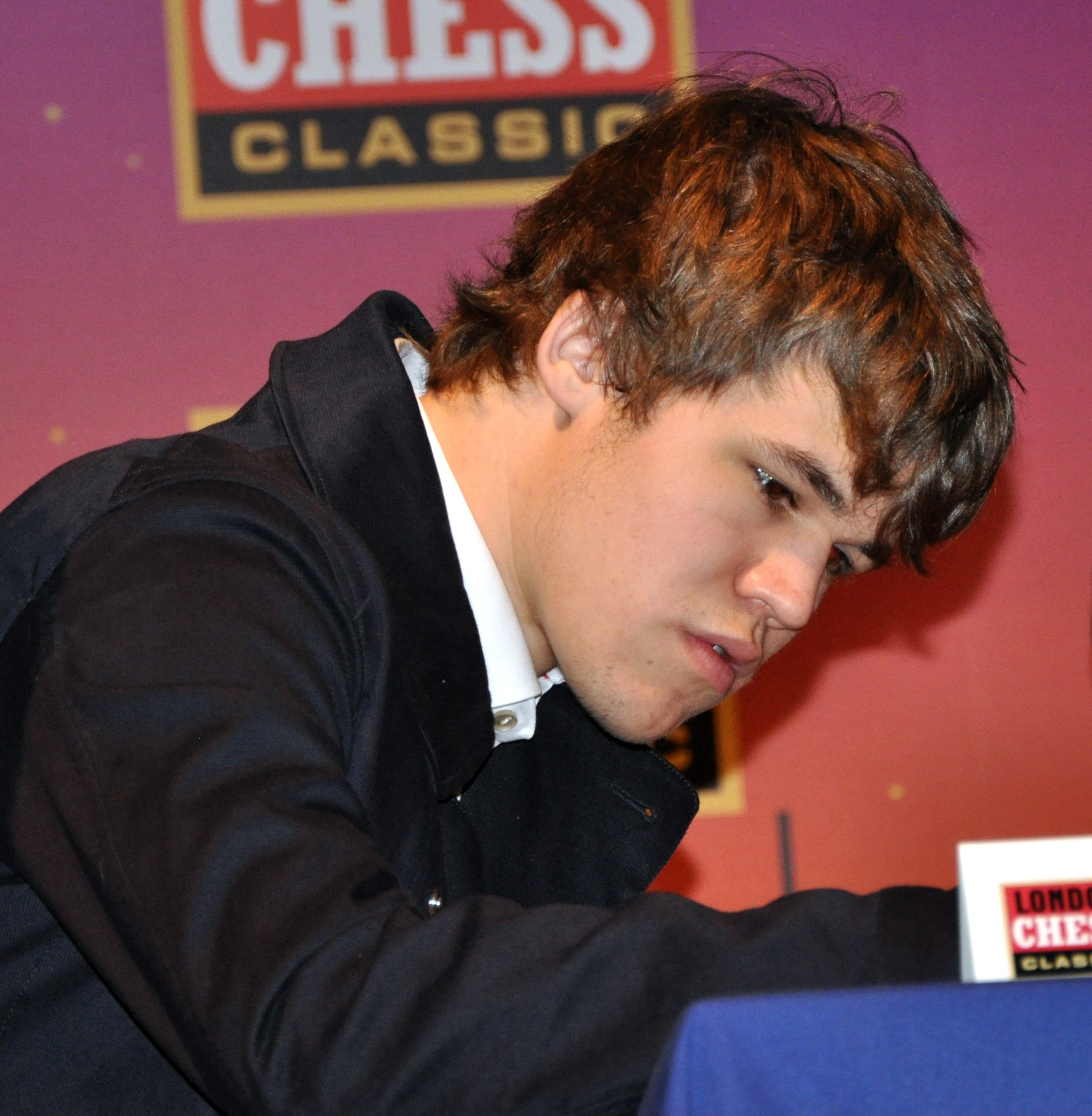
Carlsen at the 2010 London Chess Classic

On 5 November, Carlsen withdrew from the 2011 Candidates Tournament, having qualified as the highest rated challenger, citing dissatisfaction with the World Championship cycle format.

In the World Blitz Championship, held in Moscow in November, Carlsen finished third, behind Radjabov and Aronian. After the tournament, Carlsen won a private 40-game blitz match against Nakamura. Carlsen won the London Chess Classic in December, ahead of Anand and McShane.

=== 2011 ===
In January, Carlsen finished third in the 73rd Tata Steel Chess Tournament (formerly called the Corus chess tournament) behind Nakamura and Anand.

Carlsen then had a series of tournament victories with the Bazna Kings tournament in June, the 44th Biel Grandmaster tournament in July, the Grand Slam Chess Final in October, and the Tal Memorial in November.

His streak ended with London Chess Classic in December, where he finished third behind Kramnik and Nakamura. Although he did not win the tournament, Carlsen gained rating points, rising to a new personal record of 2835.

=== 2012 ===
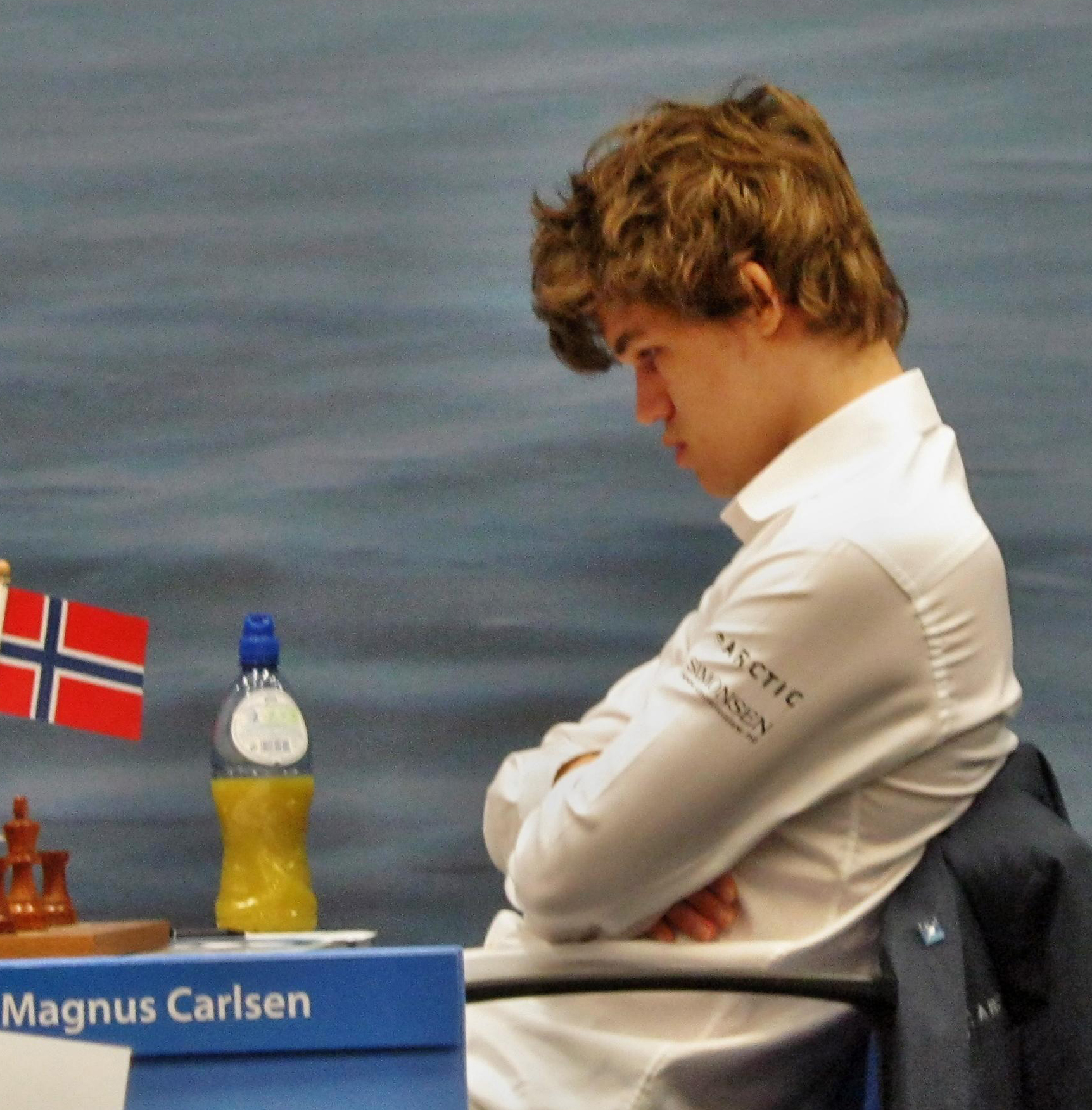
Carlsen at the 74th Tata Steel Chess Tournament in 2012

At the 74th Tata Steel Chess Tournament, Carlsen finished in a shared second place, behind Aronian, and equal with Radjabov and Caruana. At the blitz chess tournament at Tal Memorial in Moscow in June, Carlsen shared first place with Morozevich, though he won sole first place at the main event.

Carlsen then went on to finish second in the Biel Grandmaster Tournament just one point behind Wang Hao, and finishing the tournament without any losses. He also defeated Wang in both of their individual games. In the exhibition blitz tournament before the GM tournament, Carlsen was eliminated in the first round by Étienne Bacrot.

Carlsen won the Grand Slam Chess Final after two tiebreaking matches against Caruana. Then field also included Aronian, Karjakin and Anand.

In November, Carlsen took part in the chess festival Segunda Gran Fiesta Internacional de Ajedrez in Mexico City. As part of it, Carlsen took on an online audience (dubbed as "The World") and won. He then took part in the knockout exhibition event "Cuadrangular UNAM", beating Lázaro Bruzón and Judit Polgár.

Carlsen won the London Chess Classic in December with five wins (over McShane, Aronian, Gawain Jones, Adams and Judit Polgár) and three draws (against Kramnik, Nakamura and Anand). This win, the third time Carlsen had won the tournament in the past four years, increased his rating to a new record of 2861, breaking Kasparov's 13-year record of 2851. By rating performance, this was one of the best results in history, with a PR of 2994.

=== 2013 ===
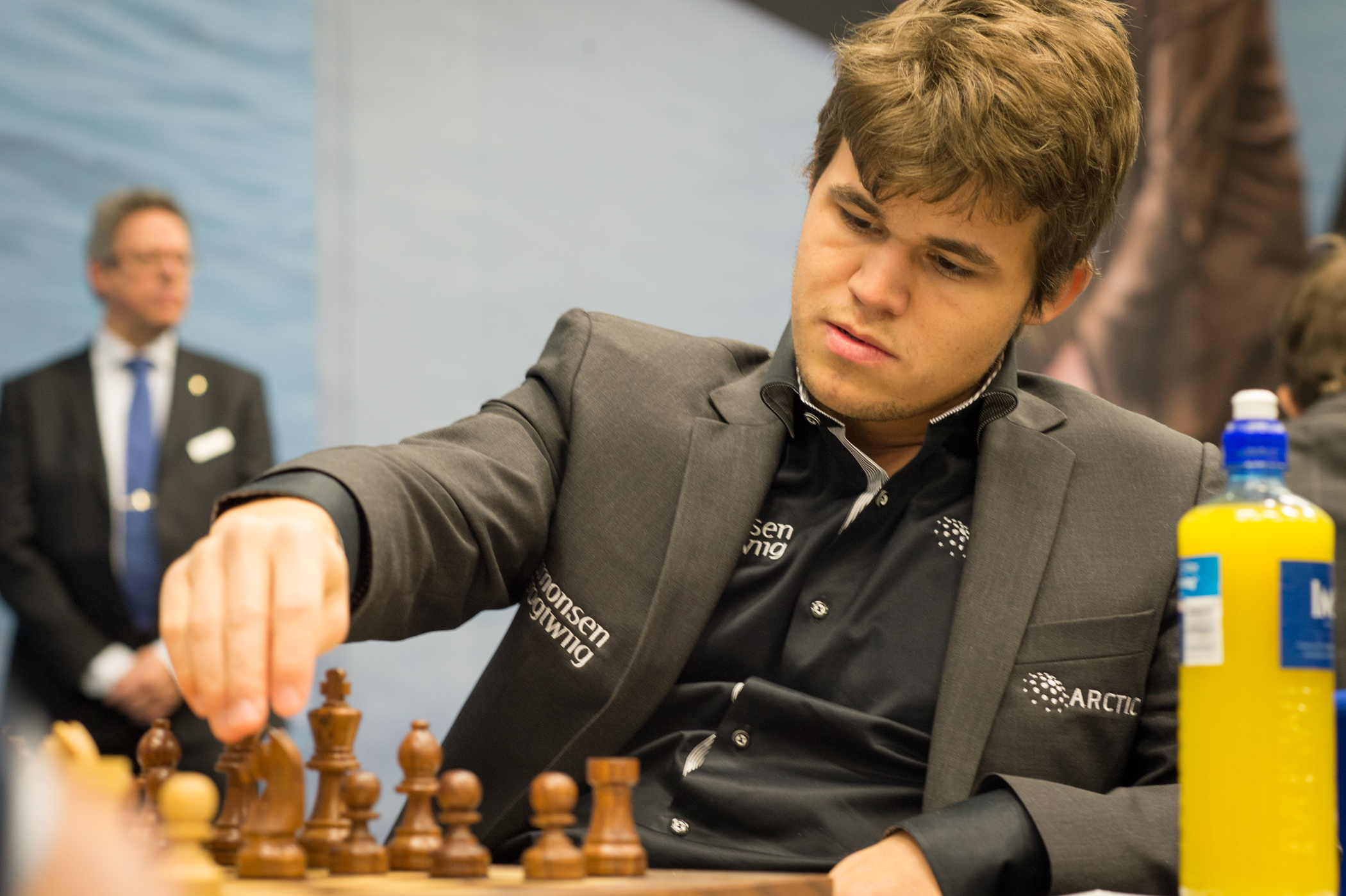
Carlsen in play during round seven of the 75th Tata Steel, 2013

Carlsen came first in the 75th Tata Steel Chess Tournament, ahead of Aronian. On 1 February, Danish GM Peter Heine Nielsen joined the team of assistants who helped Carlsen prepare for the Candidates Tournament in March. Before this, Nielsen was on Vishy Anand's team.

Carlsen then won the 2013 Candidates Tournament in London on tiebreak over Vladimir Kramnik. As a result, he earned the right to challenge Anand for the World Championship.

In May, Carlsen finished second in the inaugural Norway Chess tournament, half a point behind Sergey Karjakin.

Carlsen finished second in the Tal Memorial in June, again only half a point behind Boris Gelfand and beating Anand, Kramnik and Nakamura. Later that month, Carlsen won a four-game friendly rapid match against Borki Predojević.

Carlsen then won the inaugural Sinquefield Cup in September, this time a full point ahead of Nakamura.

In November, Carlsen faced Anand in his first World Chess Championship, at Hyatt Regency in Chennai, India. Carlsen won the match 6½–3½, becoming the 16th undisputed World Chess Champion.

=== 2014 ===
From January to February, Carlsen played in the Zurich Chess Challenge, winning the blitz event and the classical event. He fared worse in the rapid event but retained enough of a lead to win the tournament. In March, Carlsen played a game for his club Stavanger in the final team match for promotion to the Norwegian Premier League. His win over Vladimir Georgiev helped his team win against Nordstrand.

Carlsen won the Vugar Gashimov Memorial in Şəmkir, Azerbaijan, in April, beating Shakhriyar Mamedyarov and Nakamura and drawing against Karjakin, but losing to Caruana and Radjabov, his first time in four years losing two consecutive games. Carlsen beat Mamedyarov and Nakamura again in the second, and beat Caruana in the final round.

On 8 May, Carlsen played an exhibition game at Oslo City against the people of Norway, assisted by a grandmaster panel consisting of Simen Agdestein, Jon Ludvig Hammer, and Leif Erlend Johannessen, each of whom was allowed three chances to consult a chess engine during the game. The game was drawn when Carlsen forced a perpetual check.

Carlsen placed second in Norway Chess 2014 in June, a ten-player round robin, half a point behind Karjakin.

Carlsen won the World Rapid Championship 2014, which was held in Dubai in June. He went on to claim the World Blitz Championship two days later, becoming the first player to simultaneously hold the title in all three FIDE rated time controls, known as the "triple crown".

Carlsen played nine games for Norway in the 41st Chess Olympiad, scoring five wins, two draws, and two losses (against Arkadij Naiditsch and Ivan Šarić).

Carlsen placed second to Fabiano Caruana in the Sinquefield Cup, a six-player double round robin held from 27 August to 7 September. Billed as the strongest chess tournament ever held, the remaining 4 players in the event were Levon Aronian, Hikaru Nakamura, Veselin Topalov, and Maxime Vachier-Lagrave. Carlsen lost to Caruana in round 3 and defeated Aronian and Nakamura in rounds 5 and 7, respectively.

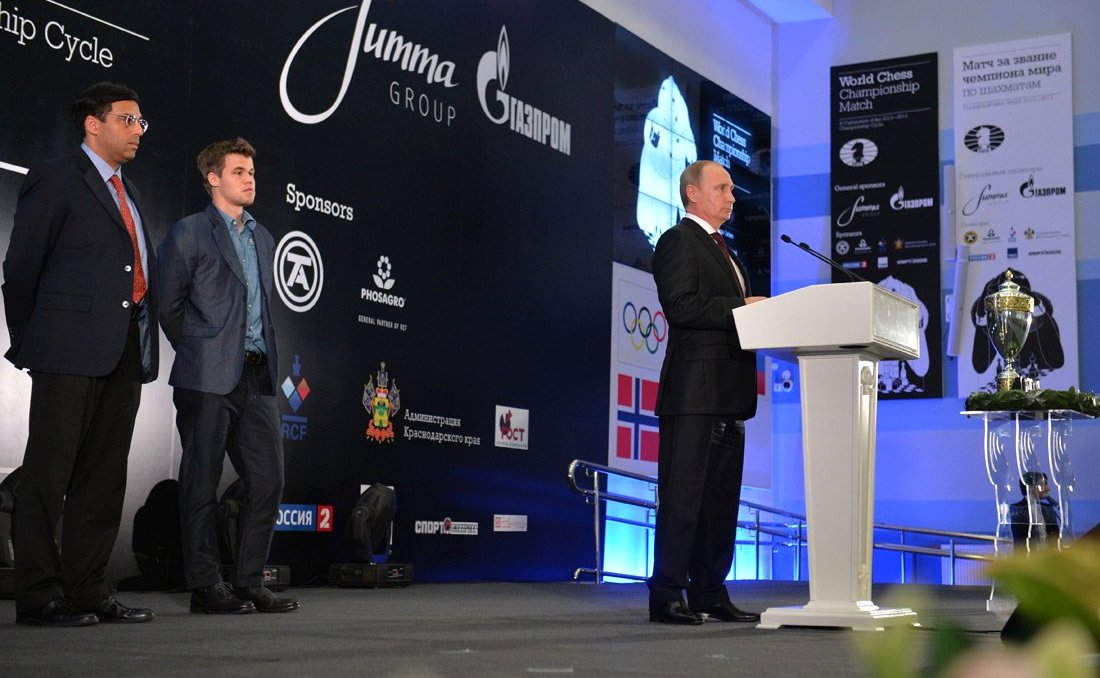
Anand and Carlsen on stage at the closing ceremony of 2014 World Chess Championship in Sochi, Russia (Vladimir Putin at podium)

Carlsen successfully defended his World Champion title against Anand in the World Chess Championship 2014 in Sochi, Russia in November, winning 6½–4½

=== 2015 ===
Carlsen won the 77th Tata Steel Chess Tournament in January, despite a notable loss in the third round to Radosław Wojtaszek.

In February, Carlsen won the 3rd Grenke Chess Classic after a five-game tiebreak with Arkadij Naiditsch. In April, Carlsen won Shamkir Chess, defeating Mamedyarov, Caruana, Vachier-Lagrave, Kramnik, and Rauf Mamedov.

Carlsen had a poor result in the third edition of Norway Chess, in June, coming in seventh. Carlsen said of this result: "It's just extremely frustrating not to be able to show anything close to what I am capable of in my home country."

Carlsen finished second in the 2015 Sinquefield Cup, one point behind Aronian, but defeating the 2014 Sinquefield winner Fabiano Caruana.

In October, Carlsen successfully defended his title in the FIDE World Rapid Championships held in Berlin, as the first World Rapid Champion to do so in history. He reached the highest live rapid rating in history after the tournament, and was at that point ranked No. 1 in all three disciplines simultaneously. However, Carlsen lost his No. 1 blitz ranking after he had a weak second day in the World Blitz Championship, and was unable to retain his World Blitz Champion title, losing it to Alexander Grischuk.

In November, Carlsen participated in the European Team Chess Championship with the Norwegian team. He started off poorly, losing to Aronian and Yannick Pelletier and drawing against Sune Berg Hansen, but finished strongly, scoring victories against Peter Leko and Radoslaw Wojtaszek. Despite this, his performance was not enough to earn his team a medal, and he lost 16 rating points during the event.

In December, Carlsen participated in the final leg of the Grand Chess Tour, the London Chess Classic, finishing joint first with Anish Giri and Maxime Vachier-Lagrave. Carlsen eventually won the tiebreak. Carlsen then played in the second edition of the Qatar Masters Open, which was held from 20 to 29 December. He finished joint first with Yu Yangyi, who he then defeated in the tiebreaking match.

=== 2016 ===
Carlsen again won the year's Tata Steel Chess Tournament in January, his fifth time doing so.

In April, Carlsen played in the fourth edition of Norway Chess. He finished in first, half a point ahead of Aronian. This was his first Norway Chess victory.

In June, Carlsen placed first in the Leuven leg of the Grand Chess Tour, two and a half points ahead of Wesley So.

In July, Carlsen won the 9th edition of the Bilbao Masters Final. His only loss was to Hikaru Nakamura, who had never beaten Carlsen in classical chess before.

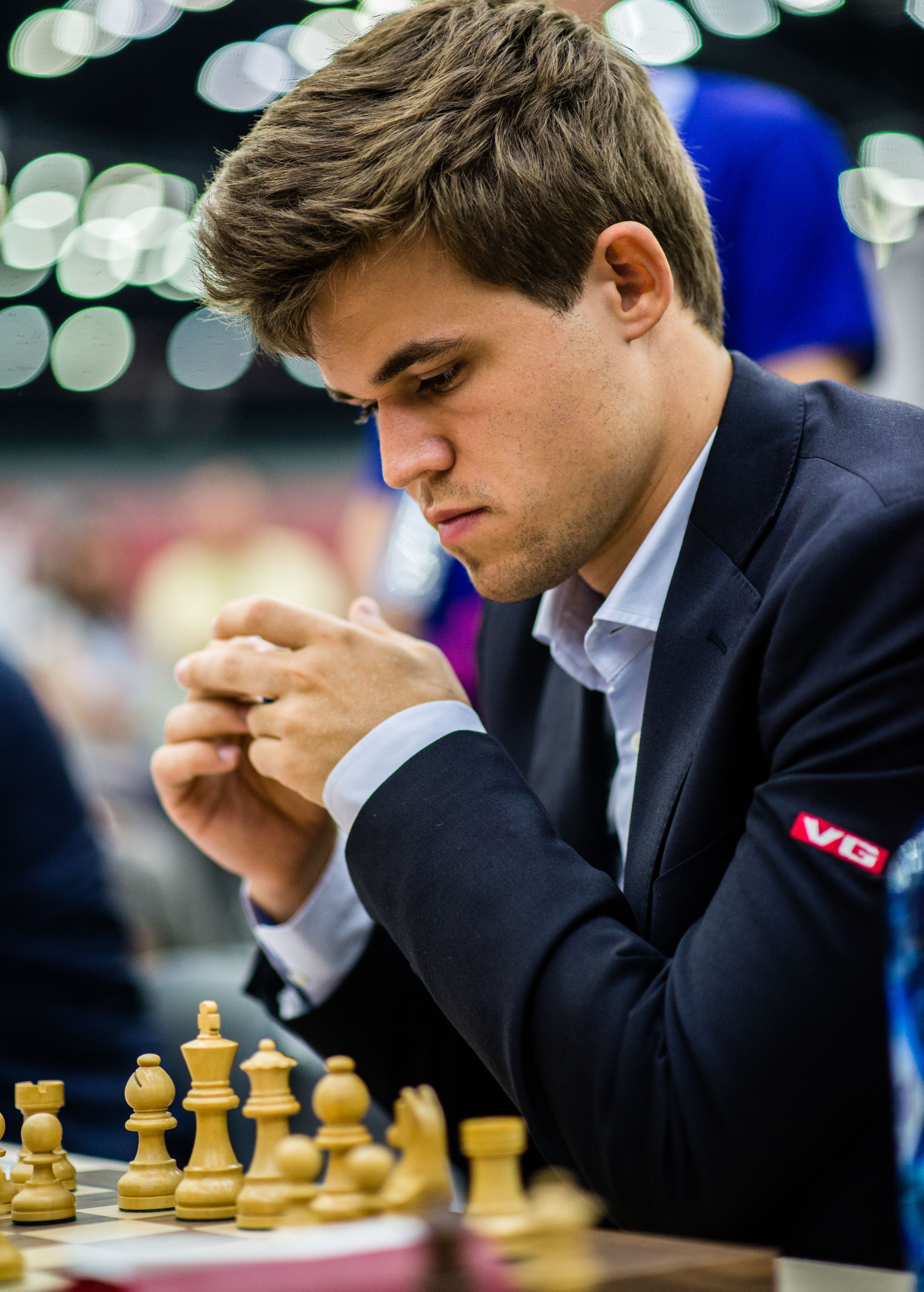
Carlsen at the 42nd Chess Olympiad, 8 September 2016

Carlsen represented 12th-seeded Norway in the 42nd Chess Olympiad, leading the team to a 5th-place finish out of 180.

Carlsen also played in Chess.com's inaugural Grandmaster Blitz Battle Championship in October, a blitz and bullet knockout event. Magnus defeated Tigran L. Petrosian in the first round, and beat Alexander Grischuk in the semi-final. He defeated Nakamura in the final to become the first Speed Chess Champion.

In December, Carlsen played in the World Rapid and Blitz Championships held in Doha, Qatar. He tied for first with Vasyl Ivanchuk and Grischuk, but finished third on tiebreak. In the blitz tournament, he finished second on tiebreak behind Karjakin.

Carlsen faced Karjakin in the 2016 World Chess Championship in New York City. The match began with seven consecutive draws and concluded with a 6–6 tie. Carlsen won the tiebreaking games and retained his World Champion title. In the fourth rapid tiebreak game, Carlsen won through a queen sacrifice that Grandmaster Lubomir Kavalek described as "the most brilliant final move of any world chess championship in history."

=== 2017 ===
Carlsen placed second in the 79th Tata Steel Chess Tournament, one point behind So.

In April, Carlsen competed in the 4th Grenke Chess Classic, finishing in joint second place with Caruana behind Aronian, but dropping to third on tiebreaks. As a result, Carlsen's FIDE rating dropped to 2832, his lowest since November 2011 (2826).

Carlsen placed ninth in the fifth edition of Norway Chess in June after losing to tournament winner Aronian and Kramnik and winning against Karjakin, but came first in the Paris leg of the 2017 Grand Chess Tour later that month. Carlsen then won Leuven leg of the Grand Chess Tour in July with a performance that Leonard Barden said was only matched by Bobby Fischer at the 1970 World Blitz Championship.

Carlsen competed in the Sinquefield Cup in August, the first classical event of the Grand Chess Tour. He finished joint second with Anand behind Vachier-Lagrave. This result left Carlsen in first place in the Grand Chess Tour standings with 34 points, three points ahead of Vachier-Lagrave.

In September, he took part in the Chess World Cup 2017. He defeated Oluwafemi Balogun and Aleksey Dreev in the first two round, but was then defeated in the third by Bu Xiangzhi and eliminated.

Carlsen won the Isle of Man Open in October, his first classical tournament victory in 435 days.

In November, Carlsen defeated Ding Liren in the 2017 Champions Showdown, a match consisting of 10 rapid and 20 blitz games, hosted by the Saint Louis Chess Club.

In December, Carlsen competed in the 2017 London Chess Classic, the final event of the 2017 Grand Chess Tour. He finished in a 3-way tie for 3rd, which was enough to crown him the 2017 Grand Chess Tour champion.

Later that month, Carlsen played in the 2017 World Rapid and World Blitz Championships, held in Riyadh, Saudi Arabia, finishing fifth in the rapid event and winning the blitz event, which was his third World Blitz Chess Championship victory.

Carlsen set records for the highest FIDE ratings in rapid (2919) and blitz (2986).

=== 2018 ===
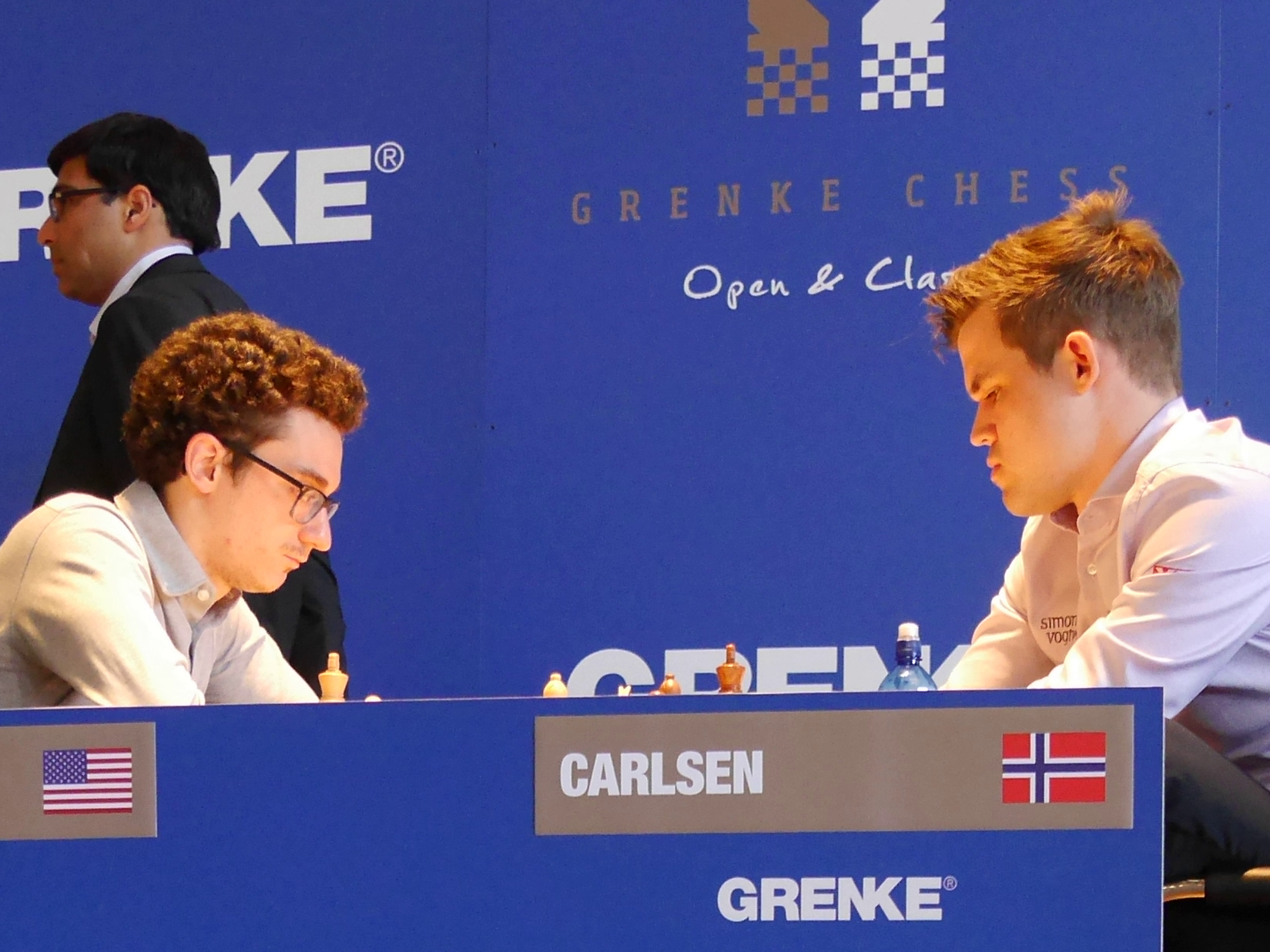
Carlsen facing Fabiano Caruana at the 5th Grenke Chess Classic, 31 March 2018

From October 2017 to January 2018, Carlsen played in the second edition of Chess.com's Speed Chess Championship. He defeated Gadir Guseinov, So and Grischuk in the first three rounds and Nakamura in the final, thus winning the tournament for a consecutive time.

From 13 to 28 January, Carlsen competed in the 80th Tata Steel Chess Tournament. He placed joint first with Giri then won in the blitz playoff, thus winning the tournament for a record sixth time. In February, Carlsen won a Chess960 match against Nakamura by a score of 14–10.

Carlsen placed second in the 5th Grenke Chess Classic in April, behind Caruana, then won the fifth edition of Shamkir Chess later that month. From 28 May to 7 June, he competed in the sixth edition of Norway Chess, placing second behind Caruana.

Carlsen participated in the 51st Biel Grandmaster tournament, held from 23 July to 1 August. He finished second behind Mamedyarov. In August, he competed in the 6th Sinquefield Cup, tying for first with Caruana and Aronian and jointly winning after the trio decided to share the title. Carlsen represented Vålerenga sjakklubb at the 34th European Chess Club Cup in October; his team finished fifth.

Carlsen played in the 2018 World Rapid and World Blitz Chess Championships in December, held in Saint Petersburg, Russia. He lost three of his first eight games to significantly lower-rated opponents in the rapid event and placed fifth overall, but successfully defended his blitz title.

Carlsen faced Caruana in the 2018 World Chess Championship in London from 9 and 28 November. All 12 classical games were drawn, but Carlsen defeated Caruana 3–0 in rapid tiebreak games, winning his fourth World Championship.

=== 2019 ===
Carlsen again won the year's Tata Steel Chess Tournament in January, acheiving his record-extending seventh Tata Steel title.

Carlsen also won the sixth edition of Shamkir Chess, held from 31 March to 9 April, and said at the event's closing ceremony that it was "one of the best tournaments I've ever played, both in terms of performance and also the quality of the games." Later in April, Carlsen won the 6th Grenke Chess Classic.

In early May, Carlsen won the Côte d'Ivoire Rapid & Blitz, the first leg of the 2019 Grand Chess Tour. In late May, Carlsen won his sixth consecutive tournament, winning the Lindores Abbey Chess Stars Tournament.

In June, he won the seventh edition of Norway Chess in June and the second leg of the 2019 Grand Chess Tour, held in Zagreb, in July. The latter was Carlsen's eighth consecutive tournament victory and improved his rating to 2882, equalling his peak set in 2014.

In August, Carlsen participated in the fourth leg of the 2019 Grand Chess Tour, the St. Louis Rapid & Blitz, finishing in sixth . The fifth leg, the 7th Sinquefield Cup, was a classical tournament. Carlsen finished second after losing a tiebreak to Ding.

At the FIDE Grand Swiss Tournament 2019 held in October on the Isle of Man, Carlsen placed sixth. He thus extended his unbeaten streak in classical chess to 101 games, surpassing Ding's record of 100 games. The 101 games consisted of 33 wins and 68 draws.

From 27 October to 2 November, Carlsen played in the inaugural FIDE World Fischer Random Chess Championship. He defeated Caruana in the semi-finals but lost to So in the final. In late November, Carlsen won the Tata Steel Rapid & Blitz, the final leg of the 2019 Grand Chess Tour. At the 2019 London Chess Classic in December, the finals of the 2019 Grand Chess Tour, Carlsen was defeated in the semi-finals by Vachier-Lagrave on tie-breaks, eventually finishing in third.

From 26 to 30 December, Carlsen played in the World Rapid and World Blitz Championships, held in Moscow, Russia, where he won his third World Rapid title and his fifth World Blitz title. With these two tournament wins, Carlsen also claimed his third triple crown.

=== 2020 ===
From 10 to 26 January, Carlsen competed in the 82nd Tata Steel Chess Tournament. He finished in second place with a score of 8/13 (+3−0=10), two points behind Caruana, who dominated the tournament. During the tournament, Carlsen surpassed Sergei Tiviakov's unbeaten streak in classical chess of 110 games.

During the COVID-19 pandemic, which prompted the cancellation of many physical tournaments, Carlsen organized the Magnus Carlsen Invitational along with Chess24. Billed as "the first professional online chess tournament," the eight-player rapid tournament was held from 18 April to 3 May, with a $250,000 prize fund. The first phase consisted of a single round-robin, after which the top four players would advance to the playoffs. Carlsen won the event by defeating Hikaru Nakamura 2½–1½ in the final.

Carlsen competed in the 8th Norway Chess from 5 to 16 October, which was the first elite over-the-board tournament held since social restrictions related to the COVID-19 pandemic were enforced. During the tournament, Carlsen's unbeaten streak in classical chess was ended by Jan-Krzysztof Duda. Carlsen had gone 125 games without defeat, a period spanning 2 years, 2 months and 10 days. During his streak, he recorded 42 wins and 83 draws with an average opponent rating of 2745, equivalent to the rating typically held by a top-20 player in the world. Despite the setback, Carlsen won the tournament with a round to spare, finishing on 19½ points, one point ahead of runner-up Alireza Firouzja.

In November, Carlsen played in the Skilling Open, the first leg of the Champions Chess Tour 2021. After advancing to the knockout stage, he won his matches against Anish Giri and Levon Aronian, but was beaten by Wesley So in the finals. In December, he played in the next leg of the tour, the Airthings Masters. He advanced to the knockout stage, but was eliminated by Daniil Dubov in the quarterfinals.

=== 2021 ===
Carlsen again participated in the 83rd Tata Steel Chess Tournament in January, this time finishing in sixth. His loss to young Russian grandmaster Andrey Esipenko was his first loss to a sub-2700 rated player since 2015.

Throughout the year, Carlsen played in six more events of the inaugural Champions Chess Tour 2021, and qualified for the knockout stage in each of his appearances. In the Opera Euro Rapid in February, he won matches against Daniil Dubov and Vachier-Lagrave, but was beaten by So in the final. In the Magnus Carlsen Invitational (a major) in March, he beat Aronian in the quarterfinals, but was eliminated by Ian Nepomniachtchi in the semifinals. In April, Carlsen won the New In Chess Classic by winning matches against Teimour Radjabov, Aronian, and Nakamura in the finals. He also won the FTX Crypto Cup (major) in May by winning matches against Nakamura, Radjabov, and So in the finals. In the Goldmoney Asian Rapid in June/July, he won his quarterfinals match against So, but was eliminated by Aronian in the semifinals; he beat Nepomniachtchi in the 3rd place match.

In July, Carlsen played in the FIDE World Cup 2021 held in Sochi. He reached the semifinals by winning matches against Saša Martinović, Aryan Tari, Radosław Wojtaszek, Esipenko, and Étienne Bacrot. He was then eliminated by eventual tournament winner Jan-Krzysztof Duda in the semifinals, but won the third-place match against Vladimir Fedoseev.

Returning to the Champions Chess Tour in August, Carlsen won the Aimchess US Rapid by winning matches against Duda, Aronian, and Vladislav Artemiev. In total, he won one of the three major events and two of the remaining six regular events. In the tour finals in September/October, Carlsen finished in fourth but was still named the overall tour winner due to the high number of tour points he had accumulated.

In September, Carlsen won Norway Chess 2021 ahead of runner-up Alireza Firouzja. After his sole loss in the fifth round of the classical portion to Sergey Karjakin, Carlsen won four straight classical games against Firouzja, Tari, Karjakin, and Richard Rapport.

From 26 to 30 December, Carlsen played in the World Rapid and World Blitz Chess Championships, held in Astana, Kazakhstan. He tied for first with Nodirbek Abdusattorov, Nepomniachtchi, and Fabiano Caruana in the rapid championship, but placed third on tiebreak . He finished twelfth in the blitz championship.

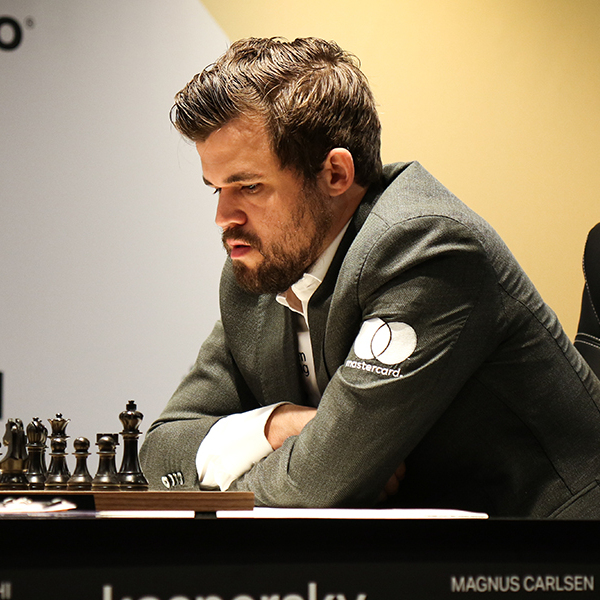
Carlsen in Dubai at the World Chess Championship 2021

Carlsen faced Nepomniachtchi in the World Chess Championship 2021 in Dubai. The match began with five consecutive draws, before Carlsen won a closely-contested eight-hour struggle in Game 6 that, with 136 moves, was the longest ever game in a World Chess Championship. Carlsen went on to win another three games, retaining his World Championship title. After the match, Carlsen announced that he was unlikely to play the next World Championship unless his challenger was rising star Alireza Firouzja.

=== 2022 ===
Carlsen again won Tata Steel in January, further extending his record to eight Tata Steel titles.

In February, Carlsen won the Airthings Masters, the first leg of the Champions Chess Tour 2022, by advancing to the knockout and winning his matches against Lê Quang Liêm, Vladislav Artemiev, and Ian Nepomniachtchi in the finals. Similarly, Carlsen won the next leg, the Charity Cup, winning matches against Hans Niemann, Ding Liren, and Jan-Krzysztof Duda in the finals. Carlsen tied for 3rd in the Oslo Esports Cup in April. In May, he advanced to the knockouts of the Chessable Masters, but after defeating David Antón Guijarro, he was eliminated by Ding in the semifinals.

Carlsen won Norway Chess 2022 in June, his fourth consecutive Norway Chess title and his fifth overall.

On 20 July, the deadline FIDE had given him, Carlsen announced that he would not defend his World Championship title against Nepomniachtchi in the following year's World Chess Championship match. Carlsen said he enjoyed playing chess tournaments more than championships, and would still continue playing professional chess.

In August, Carlsen represented 3rd-seeded team Norway for the 44th Chess Olympiad in Chennai, India. The team significantly underperformed to finish in 59th place, though Carlsen earned an individual bronze medal for board one. Later that month, he finished clear first in the next tour major, the FTX Crypto Cup.

In September, he won the Julius Baer Generation Cup. In October, he advanced to the knockouts of the Aimchess Rapid, but was defeated by Duda in the semifinals. In November, Carlsen won all his matches in the tour finals.

Earlier in November, Carlsen represented Norway at the European Team Championship 2023. He earned an individual gold medal for board one, his first in an international team competition. Carlsen played in the Speed Chess Championship 2022, convincingly winning his matches against Gukesh Dommaraju, Caruana, and Vachier-Lagrave, but was narrowly defeated by Nakamura in the finals in December.

From 26 to 30 December, Carlsen played in the World Rapid and World Blitz Chess Championships, held in Almaty, Kazakhstan, winning his fourth World Rapid title and his sixth World Blitz title. This marked the third time in Carlsen's career that he held the triple crown.

==== Sinquefield Cup withdrawal ====
In September, Carlsen participated as a wildcard in the Sinquefield Cup 2022 as part of the Grand Chess Tour 2022. He won his first game against Nepomniachtchi, the Candidates Tournament 2022 winner. In the third game, Carlsen was defeated by American wildcard Hans Niemann, ending his 53-game unbeaten streak in classical chess in a game that chess24 described as a "stunning victory". Carlsen soon after announced his withdrawal in a tweet with a video of Portuguese football manager José Mourinho saying, "I prefer really not to speak. If I speak, I am in big trouble." Carlsen's post was widely seen by the chess community as an insinuation that Niemann cheated in some way during the game, but no evidence of cheating had been found. This was the first time in Carlsen's career to withdraw from a major event in progress, and was considered "virtually unprecedented" in top level chess.

Two weeks later, Carlsen faced Niemann in the Julius Baer Generation Cup, a leg of the Champions Chess Tour 2022, an online chess tour. Carlsen, playing as black, resigned after one move, inviting more speculation. On 26 September, Carlsen finally broke his silence and accused Niemann of cheating. Subsequently, on 20 October, Niemann filed a lawsuit against Carlsen and four other defendants, alleging five counts of action, including libel, slander, and unlawful collusion.

In August 2023, Chess.com announced that all parties involved in the lawsuit had settled; Chess.com reinstated Niemann on their platform and Carlsen admitted that there was no determinative evidence that Niemann had cheated in their Sinquefield Cup game. He promised to play against Niemann should they be paired. That December, FIDE fined Carlsen €10,000 for his withdrawal from the Sinquefield Cup, but acquitted him of all charges related to his allegations against Niemann.

=== 2023 ===
Carlsen at the Tata Steel Chess Tournament 2023

Carlsen again participated in the Tata Steel Chess Tournament in January. For the first time since 2015, he lost consecutive games, first to Anish Giri and then to Nodirbek Abdusattorov. He recovered and finished in joint 2nd with Abdusattorov, a half point behind tournament winner Giri.

Carlsen competed in the Norway Chess tournament, and performed poorly with a winless score of 11½/27 (+0–1=8). He finished in 6th place out of 10, helped by his 7/8 score in the armageddon games.

Carlsen competed in two Grand Chess Tour Rapid & Blitz events as a wildcard. In May and July, Carlsen won the Superbet Rapid & Blitz Poland and the SuperUnited Rapid and Blitz Croatia respectively.

In the Chess World Cup 2023, Carlsen reached the finals by winning his matches against Levan Pantsulaia, Aryan Tari, Vincent Keymer (in tiebreaks), Vasyl Ivanchuk, Gukesh Dommaraju, and Nijat Abasov. Carlsen was sickened by food poisoning during the tournament. In the finals against R Praggnanandhaa, Carlsen won during the tiebreaks to claim his first World Cup title. With this tournament win, Carlsen qualified for the Candidates Tournament 2024, but he declined his invitation.

Carlsen won the Speed Chess Championship 2023 in October. Later that month, Carlsen played in the Qatar Masters 2023. He had a very poor event and lost 17 rating points. Notably, he was "completely crushed" in round two by Alisher Suleymenov, his lowest-rated loss in 15 years. Carlsen attributed his loss to losing concentration as his opponent was wearing a watch. He also stated that the anti-cheating measures at the tournament were not sufficient.

Throughout the year, Carlsen played in five of the six legs of the Champions Chess Tour and won three: the Airthings Masters, Aimchess Rapid, and Julius Baer Generation Cup. In the Chessable Masters, he was knocked out by Nakamura in the losers final and in the AI Cup, he lost to Vachier-Lagrave in the grand final. In December, Carlsen played the tour finals at Toronto, tying for first with So in the preliminary stag. He then defeated Caruana in the semifinals and So in the finals, both in straight sets, to win his third Champions Chess Tour title.

In December, Carlsen played in the World Rapid and World Blitz Championships in Samarkand, Uzbekistan, winning his fifth World Rapid title and his seventh World Blitz title, marking his fourth triple crown.

=== 2024 ===
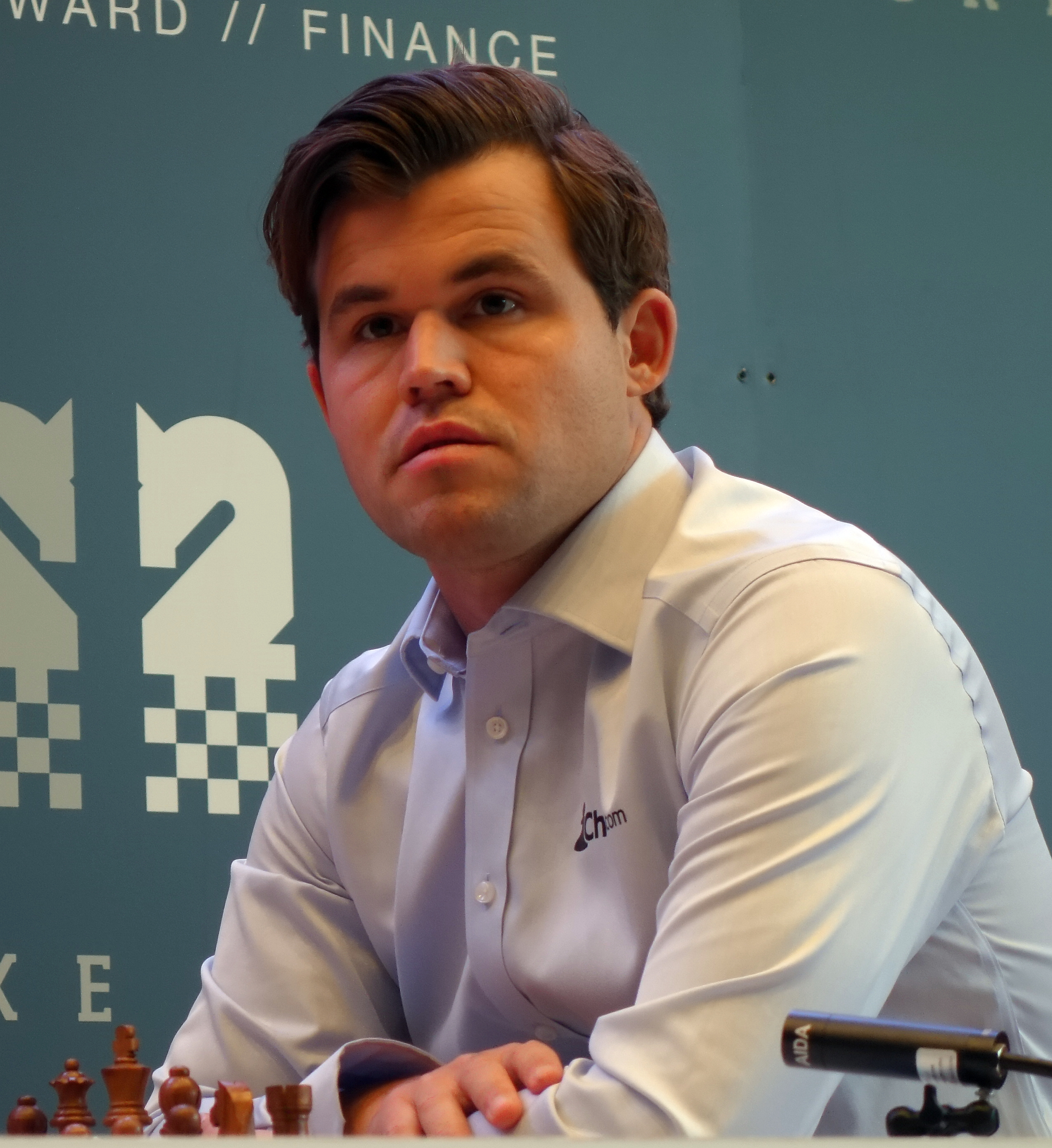
Carlsen at the 2024 Grenke Chess Classic

In February, Carlsen co-organized and played in the Freestyle Chess G.O.A.T. Challenge, the first ever classical Chess960 super-tournament. He won the main event and reached the finals by defeating Firouzja in the quarterfinals (in tiebreak) and Nodirbek Abdusattorov in the semifinals. He then beat Caruana in the finals to win the tournament.

In May, Carlsen won the GCT Superbet Rapid and Blitz Poland as a wildcard. Carlsen then played in Norway Chess 2024 from 29 May – 7 June and won the tournament, winning his 6th Norway Chess title.

Carlsen reached the final-four of the Speed Chess Championship 2024 by winning matches against Minh Le and Arjun Erigaisi. The live finals held in Paris was highly anticipated due to his semi-final match against Niemann, their first in-person encounter since Carlsen's cheating accusations. Carlsen defeated Niemann 17½–12½ and then beat Firouzja in the finals 23½–7½, winning his fourth Speed Chess Championship. Later that month, Carlsen represented sixth-seeded team Norway at the 45th Chess Olympiad in Budapest, Hungary. The team finished in 14th place among the 188 participating countries. Carlsen won an individual bronze medal for board one.

Throughout the year, Carlsen played in all four legs of the Champions Chess Tour 2024. He won two of them — the Chessable Masters and Julius Baer Generation Cup — defeating Firouzja in the grand final of both events. In the Chess.com Classic, he lost to Firouzja in the grand final and in the Crunchlabs Masters, he was knocked out by So in elimination round 2. In December, Carlsen played in the tour finals in Oslo. He defeated Vachier-Lagrave in the semifinals and Nepomniachtchi in the finals to win his fifth Champions Chess Tour title.

From 26 to 31 December, Carlsen played in the World Rapid and World Blitz Championships at New York. After round 6 of the rapid championship, Carlsen was warned and fined US$200 for wearing jeans, a dress code violation. He refused to change his jeans after being given the opportunity, causing him to not be paired for round nine. In protest, he withdrew himself from both the Rapid and the blitz championships. Prior to his forfeit, he had done poorly, scoring 5/8 (+3–1=4) and losing 19 rapid rating points.

After a loosening of the dress code, Carlsen reversed his decision and announced he would take part in the blitz championship. He advanced to the eight-player knockout after finishing in a large tie for 1st in the preliminary stage. He defeated Niemann in the quarterfinals and Jan-Krzysztof Duda in the semifinals matches. In the finals against Nepomniachtchi, he took a 2–0 lead, but Nepomniachtchi won two games on demand and the match remained deadlocked after seven games. The two requested that they share the title, which FIDE agreed to, receiving widespread criticism from the chess community.

=== 2025 ===
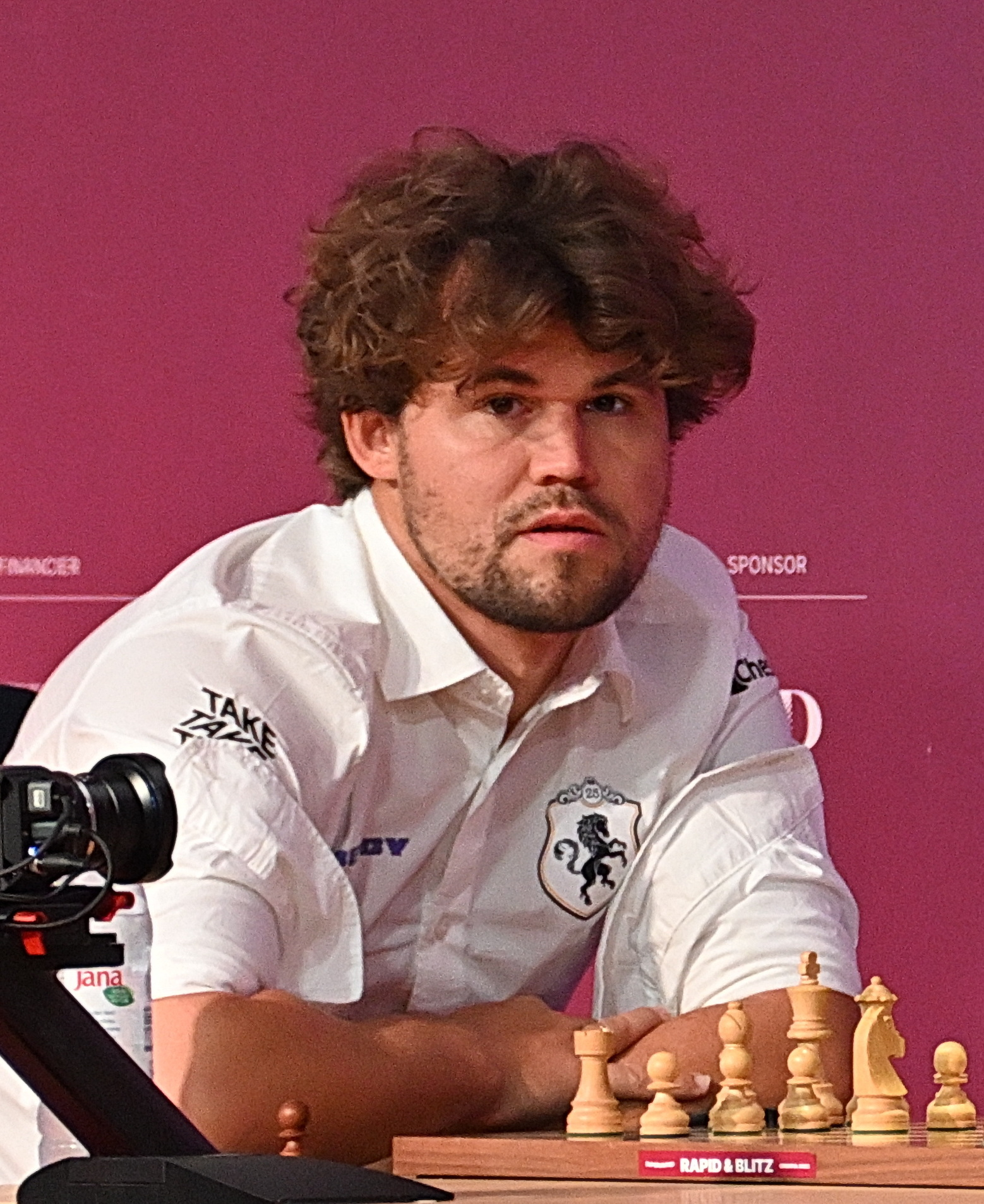
Carlsen at the 2025 GCT SuperUnited Rapid & Blitz Croatia

From 26 May to 6 June 2025, Carlsen played in Norway Chess 2025. A critical moment occurred in round six when Carlsen had a decisive advantage against Gukesh Dommaraju, but ended up losing after a dramatic turnaround. Distraught from the loss, Carlsen slammed the table, a moment that went viral on social media. However, he recovered to win his 7th Norway Chess title with wins over Gukesh, Arjun Erigaisi, and Fabiano Caruana.

In July, Carlsen again won the GCT SuperUnited Rapid & Blitz Croatia as a wildcard. In October, Carlsen won the Clutch Chess Champions Showdown in St. Louis.

Carlsen had been announced in February as the second chess player to be signed by Dutch esports organization Team Liquid, after Caruana. As part of the deal, Carlsen would represent Liquid during the Champions Chess Tour 2025. Carlsen won both legs of the tour, the Chessable Masters and Chess.com Classic, defeating Nakamura and Vachier-Lagrave respectively in the grand finals. Then, from 29 July to Aug 1, Carlsen represented Liquid at the inaugural Esports World Cup chess event. After advancing to the playoffs, he reached the finals by defeating Nihal Sarin and Nakamura. He then defeated Firouzja in the finals across two sets to become the first-ever Chess Esports World Cup Champion.

Throughout the year, Carlsen participated in the Freestyle Chess Tour, a novel series of elite Chess960 tournaments. In the first leg at Wangels in February, he was eliminated by eventual winner Vincent Keymer in the semifinals but then beat Javokhir Sindarov in the 3rd place match. In April, he won the second leg in Paris, defeating Nakamura in the finals. Later that month, he won the Grenke Freestyle Open in Karlsruhe, recording a perfect score of 9/9, two points clear of the field. A very rare achievement for an elite tournament, this result is considered one of the greatest tournament performances of all time. In July, he played in the fourth leg in Las Vegas. His group stage result limited him to a 3rd-place finish at best, which he managed by winning all of his knockout matches. In December, he played in the tour finals in Cape Town where he was defeated by Aronian in the finals. However, due to his significant lead in tour points, he was still crowned the Freestyle Tour Champion.

From 26 to 30 December, Carlsen played in the World Rapid and World Blitz Championships, held in Doha, Qatar. He again won his sixth World Rapid title and ninth World Blitz title, which was his fifth triple crown. Carlsen garnered controversy when he pushed away the camera of a videographer who was filming him after he had lost to Vladislav Artemiev in round 7 of the World Rapid.

=== 2026 ===
Carlsen reached the final-four of the Speed Chess Championship 2025 (Note: Although this was the 2025 edition of the event, the live finals occurred in 2026.) by winning matches against José Martínez Alcántara and Caruana. In the live finals in February at London, he defeated Denis Lazavik in the semifinals and Firouzja in the finals, winning his fifth Speed Chess Championship. Later that month, he won the FIDE Freestyle Chess World Championship 2026. After qualifying for the knockout stage, he beat Nodirbek Abdusattorov in the semifinals and Caruana in the final to win his 21st world championship title.

In April, Carlsen played in the Grenke Freestyle Open at Karlsruhe, finishing in a tie for third. He then won the online Chess.com Open, defeating Jan-Krzysztof Duda in the grand final. The next week, he returned to classical chess at the TePe Sigeman Chess Tournament 2026 in Malmo, where he tied for first place with Arjun Erigaisi, who he then defeated in the tiebreaks.

Carlsen went on to play at Norway Chess 2026, where he finished fourth. His losses were to Firouzja, So, and twice to tournament winner R Praggnanandhaa. This marked Carlsen's first time losing four games in a classical tournament since Norway Chess 2015.

In June, Carlsen represented WR Chess in the World Rapid & Blitz Team Championships at Hong Kong. He had a very poor result in rapid, dropping 29 points and losing four consecutive games, his first time doing so since 2003, when he was 12 years old.

At the 2026 Esports World Cup in August, Carlsen defended his title, going unbeaten throughout the event with wins against Andrey Esipenko and Niemann in the group stage, Nihal Sarin in the quarter-final, Firouzja in the semi-final, and Lazavik over two sets in the final. In September, Carlsen represented the Alpine APL Pipers in the Global Chess League 2026. His team reached the finals of the event, where they lost to the Ganges Grandmasters.

In November, Carlsen participated in the inaugural Total Chess World Championship 2026, a tournament that combines all three standard formats of chess into one event, including a unique "fast" classical style with a time control of 45+30. He won the pre-tournament blitz swiss by half a point with 7/9 (+5-0=4). Being paired as the top seed in group C in the fast classical section, he played unexpectedly poorly, placing 5th/6 without winning a single game. He lost 21.8 points in live classical rating and dropped dangerously close to 2800, which he hadn't been below since 2009. These included 9 draws in total while losing in a major upset to Haik M. Martirosyan on day 3. As a result, Carlsen was placed in the fifth knockout bracket, fighting for the 17th-20th places in the overall tournament.

In the knockout stage he was paired with Bibisara Assaubayeva, and obtained an insurmountable lead going into the fast classical section in both sets. Due to this, he proceeded to forfeit both of his fast classical games leading to controversy. With the win, he got paired against Vladislav Artemiev and won the set in armageddon, finishing in 17th place overall. Carlsen had forfeited both rapid games in the first set. In the second set he lost a rapid game, leading to him going below 2800 in the live rapid ratings for the first time in 14 years.. Carlsen had played his fast classical white game in the first set, but forfeited his game in the second set with the black pieces. Chief arbiter Anastasia Sorokina published a statement affirming that players were required to play all their games in the event, and that the organisers would be submitting the daily reports of the chief arbiter to FIDE. Following this, FIDE stated that they would refer the matter to the Ethics and Disciplinary Commission to investigate potential violations of the code by Carlsen.

== Tournament and match results ==
Legend
Classical international and national individual and team tournaments, Freestyle Chess tournaments
Tournaments organized by FIDE (Olympiads, World Championships, World Cups, FIDE Grand Swiss and Candidates tournaments)
Non classical (rapid and blitz) rated and blindfold competitions (Grand Chess Tour, Amber and Lindores Abbey tournaments, Champions Showdown matches)
Internet and esport competitions (Internet Chess Club, Chess.com, chess24.com, Lichess, Champions Chess Tour and FIDE online tournaments and matches)

TPR (Tournament Performance ratings) of FIDE-rated events calculated according to FIDE.

=== 2000–2011 ===
Tournament and match results (2000–2011)
Year	City	Tournament	Time control	Wins	Losses	Draws	Points	Place	TPR
2000	Gausdal	2000 Open Norwegian Championship	Classical	3	5	1	3.5/9		
2000	Bad Wiessee	Bavarian International Championship	Classical	3	3	3	4.5/9	228th/495	2113
2001	Gausdal	2001 Troll Masters Tournament	Classical	2	5	2	3/9	41st	
2001	Oslo	2001 Open Norwegian championship	Classical	5	3	1	5.5/9	12th	2325
2001	Gausdal	Gausdal Classics, IM Group Tournament	Classical	0	4	5	2.5/9	8th	2090
2001	Kristiansund	2001 Norwegian junior championship	Classical	3	1	5	5.5/9	6th	
2001	Bergen	Bergen International Open, Nordic Championship	Classical	2	4	3	3.5/9	71st	
2001	Panormo	17th European Chess Club Cup, Open section, Asker SK Board 6	Classical	3	1	3	4½/7	28th (Team) 11th (Board 6)	2182
2001	Bad Wiessee	Bavarian International Championship	Classical	4	2	3	5.5/9	114th/512	2334
2002	Gausdal	2002 Troll Masters Tournament	Classical	3	3	3	4.5/9	24th	2180
2002	Fredrikstad	2002 Open Norwegian Rapid Championship	Rapid				6.5/10	3rd	
2002	Mariánské Lázně	International Open	Classical	4	1	4	6/9	10th	2250
2002	Lysaker	2002 Open Norwegian junior championship	Classical	4	0	3	5.5/7	2nd	2239
2002	Gausdal	Gausdal Classics Grandmaster 2002 Tournament	Classical	2	6	1	2.5/9	8th	2273
2002	Røros	2002 Norwegian Chess Championship	Classical	1	3	4	3/8	13th-15th	
2002	Bergen	Bergen International Open	Classical	4	3	2	5/9	17th	2288
2002	Kiel	15th Kieler Open	Classical	5	2	2	6/9	15th	
2002	Peñiscola	European Under-12 Championship	Classical	6	1	2	6/9	6th	
2002	Heraklio	World Youth Chess Championship 2002, U12	Classical	8	1	2	9/11	2nd	
2003
2003	Vikersund	2003 Open Norwegian Rapid Championship	Rapid	6	3	1	6.5/10	4th-6th	
2003	Gausdal	2003 Troll Masters Tournament	Classical	6	2	2	7/10	6th	
2003	(Italy) Saint-Vincent	11th Aosta International Chess Open	Classical	3	2	4	5/9	73rd	2357
2003	Gausdal	Gausdal Classics Grandmaster 2003 Tournament	Classical	2	4	5	4/11	11th-12th	2333
2003	Oslo	2003 Open Norwegian junior championship	Classical	7	0	0	7/7	First	
2003	Stockholm	Salongernas IM Tournament	Classical	4	1	4	6/9	7th	2470
2003	Alta	Barents Championship	Classical	4	0	2	5/6	2nd	
2003	Fredrikstad	2003 Norwegian Chess Championship	Classical	3	1	5	5½/9	3rd-7th	2428
2003	Copenhagen	25th Politiken Cup. Carlsen was officially awarded the IM title on 20 August 2003.	Classical	6	1	4	8/11	7th–16th	2503
2003	Schwarzach	Schwarzacher Open	Classical	5	1	3	6½/9	4th	2537
2003	(Serbia and Montenegro) Budva	European Under-14 Championship	Classical	6	2	1	6½/9	3rd	2470
2003	Rethymno	19th European Chess Club Cup, Open section, Asker SK Board 1	Classical	3	3	1	3½/7	31st (Team) 25th (Board 1)	2501
2003	Halkidiki	World Youth Chess Championship 2003, U14	Classical	7	3	1	7½/11	9th	2407
2003	(Italy) Taormina	Claude Pecaut Memorial	Classical	3	1	5	5½/9	2nd-5th	2481
2003	(Hungary) Budapest	First Saturday December 2003	Classical	5	2	6	8/13	4th-5th	2512
2004	Wijk aan Zee	66th Corus Chess, grandmaster group C	Classical	9	1	3	10½/13	First	2702
2004	Moscow	3rd Aeroflot Open 2004	Classical	5	3	1	5½/9	40th	2660
2004	Reykjavík	21st Reykjavik Open	Classical	4	4	1	4½/9	35th	2433
2004	Reykjavík	Reykjavik Rapid 2004, Day 1 Blitz (16 players)	Blitz				4/15	15th	
2004	Reykjavík	Reykjavik Rapid Round of 16 match against Kasparov	Rapid	0	1	1	½–1½	Loss	
2004	Dubai	2004 Dubai Open Chess Tournament	Classical	4	0	5	6½/9	2nd–13th	2674
2004	Malmö; Copenhagen	12th Sigeman & Co Chess Tournament	Classical	4	2	3	5½/9	3rd	2648
2004	Tripoli	FIDE World Chess Championship 2004, First round of 128 Match against Levon Aronian	Classical Rapid Tie-break	0 0	0 1	2 1	1–1 ½–1½	Match lost	
2004	Molde	2004 Norwegian Chess Championship	Classical	6	1	2	7/9	1–2.	
2004	Copenhagen	26th Politiken Cup Politiken Cup in Copenhagen	Classical	5	0	5	7½/10	3rd–13th	
2004	Oslo	2004 Norwegian Chess Championship playoff match against Østenstad (a drawn match meant Østenstad won the title)	Classical	0	0	2	1–1	match drawn	
2004	Lausanne	5th Lausanne Young Masters (8 players knockout)	Classical Rapid Tie-breaks Blitz Tie-break	2 0 2	1 1 0	3 3 0		5th	
2004	Gausdal	2004 Gausdal Classics Grandmaster Tournament	Classical	4	3	2	5/9	5th	
2004	Hoogeveen	8th Essent Crown Tournament	Classical	1	3	2	2/6	4th	2495
2004	Calvià	36th Chess Olympiad, Open event, Norway Board 1	Classical	2	1	2	3/5	39th (Team)	
2004	Sanxenxo	48th Spanish Team Chess Championship, CA Magic Mérida Board 1	Classical	0	4	5	2½/9	5th (Team)	2467
2005	Drammen	SmartFish Drammen Chess Masters 2004–2005 (10 players)	Classical	1	4	4	3/9	9th–10th	
2005	Wijk aan Zee	67th Corus Chess, grandmaster group B	Classical	3	2	8	7/13	7th	
2005	Internet	VI Internet Chess Tournament "Ciudad de Dos Hermanas", 16 March Qualifier	Blitz				9½/12	7th	
2005	Neukölln	Bundesliga, SF Neukölln Board 1	Classical	0	1	1	½/2		
2005	Gausdal	2005 Gausdal Classics Grandmaster Tournament	Classical	3	4	2	4/9	6th-8th	
2005	Schagen	Deloitte Vierkamp Rapid Tournament (4 players double round-robin)	Rapid	1	2	3	2½/6	2–4.	
2005	Zegrze	European Individual Chess Championship	Classical	5	2	6	8/13	34th	
2005	Leon	18th Ciudad de Leon, Semi-final Match against Anand	Rapid	0	2	2	1-3	Match lost	
2005	Sandnes	2005 Norwegian Chess Championship	Classical	6	1	2	7/9	1–2.	
2005	Biel/Bienne	38th Biel Grandmaster Tournament	Classical	0	2	8	4/10	6th	
2005	Lausanne	6th Lausanne Young Masters (8 players knockout)	Classical Rapid Tie-breaks	2 2	1 0	3 0		5th	
2005	Gausdal	Arnold Eikrem Memorial, Bygger'n Masters	Classical	7	0	2	8/9	First	2792
2005	Oslo	2005 Norwegian Chess Championship playoff match against Agdestein	Classical Rapid Tie-Break	1 2	1 1	0 3		Loss	
2005	Skanderborg	2nd Samba Cup	Classical	1	2	6	4/9	8th	
2005	Khanty-Mansiysk	Chess World Cup 2005	Classical Rapid (25 min) Tie-break Rapid (10 min) Tie-break	5 5 1	3 4 0	6 1 1		10th	
2006	Wijk aan Zee	68th Corus Chess, grandmaster group B	Classical	6	1	6	9/13	1st–2nd	
2006	Aalborg	Fibertex Cup (4 players double-round robin)	Blindfold Rapid	3	1	2	4/6	2nd	
2006	Reykjavík	22nd Reykjavik Open	Classical	6	2	1	6½/9	6–9.	
2006	Reykjavík	Glitnir Blitz 2006	Blitz					Win	
2006	Internet	VII Internet Chess Tournament "Ciudad de Dos Hermanas"	Blitz					5–8.	
2006	Schagen	DSB Bank Match against Van Wely	Classical Blitz Tie-break	1 1	1 0	2 1	2–2 2–0	Win	
2006	Sarajevo	Bosna Sarajevo Tournament	Classical	1	0	9	5½/10	3rd	
2006	Turin	37th Chess Olympiad, Open event, Norway Board 1	Classical	5	2	2	6/9	31st (Team) 5th (Board 1)	
2006	Tromsø	Midnight Sun Challenge	Classical	6	1	2	7/9	2–3.	
2006	Moss	2006 Norwegian Chess Championship	Classical	6	1	2	7/9	1–2.	
2006	Biel/Bienne	39th Biel Grandmaster Tournament	Classical	4	2	4	6/10	2–3.	
2006	Amsterdam	NH Hotels Chess Tournament, Rising Stars Team, Board 1	Classical	4	1	5	6½/10	Team won	
2006	Spitzbergen	2006 Spitsbergen Festival Match against Svidler	Rapid	0	1	1	½–1½	Loss	
2006	Rishon LeZion	FIDE World Blitz Championship 2006	Blitz	5	5	5	7½/15	8.	
2006	Bærum	2006 Norwegian Chess Championship playoff match against Agdestein	Classical Rapid Tie-Break	0 2	0 0	2 0		Win	
2006	Cap d'Agde	Cap d'Agde Rapid Tournament	Rapid				Semi-finalist		
2006	Moscow	1st Tal Memorial	Classical	0	2	7	3½/9	8–9.	
2006	Moscow	1st Tal Memorial Blitz Cup	Blitz	11	10	13	17½/34	9–10.	
2006	Bonn	Bundesliga, OSC Baden-Baden Board 2 (1 game)	Classical	1	0	0	1/1		
2007
2007	Wijk aan Zee	69th Corus Chess, grandmaster group A	Classical	0	4	9	4½/13	13–14 (Last)	
2007	Faaborg	Faaborg-Midtfyn Cup (4 players double-round robin) Playoff final against P.H. Nielsen	Blindfold Rapid	3 2	1 0	2 0	4/6 2–0	Win	
2007	Linares, Jaén	24th Linares International Chess Tournament	Classical	4	3	7	7½/14	2–3.	
2007	Nice	16th Amber chess tournament	Rapid Blindfold Rapid Combined				6½/11 4/11 10½/22	2–5. 9–10. 8–9.	
2007	Baden-Baden	Bundesliga, OSC Baden-Baden Board 5	Classical	1	0	1	1½/2		
2007	Gausdal	2007 Gausdal Classics Grandmaster Tournament	Classical	5	0	4	7/9	First	
2007	Porto-Vecchio	Match of the Hopes against Radjabov	Rapid Blitz Armageddon	1 0 0	1 0 1	0 2 –	1:1 1:1 0:1	Loss	
2007	Elista	2007 FIDE Candidates Match against Levon Aronian	Classical Rapid Tie-Break Blitz Tie-Break	2 1 0	2 1 2	2 2 0	3:3 2:2 0:2	Loss	
2007	Dortmund	35th Sparkassen Chess Meeting	Classical	0	1	6	3/7	6.	
2007	Biel/Bienne	40th Biel Grandmaster Tournament (Tie-Break against Alexander Onischuk)	Classical Rapid Tie-break Blitz Tie-break Armageddon	4 0 0 1	2 0 0 0	3 2 2 –	5½/9 1:1 1:1 1:0	First	
2007	Tromsø	2nd Arctic Chess Challenge	Classical	5		4	7/9	2–4.	
2007	Kemer	23rd European Chess Club Cup, Open section, OSG Baden-Baden Board 3	Classical	3	1	3	4½/7	4th (Team) 14th (Board 3)	2689
2007	Bilbao	Bilbao Blindfold Chess World Cup	Blindfold	4	2	4	16/30	3rd	
2007	Oslo	Glitnir Blitz 2007	Blitz				2nd (finalist)		
2007	Heraklion	16th European Team Chess Championship, Open section, Norway Board 1	Classical	5	1	3	6½/9	22 (Team) 2 (Board 1)	
2007	Moscow	2nd Tal Memorial	Classical	1	1	7	4½/9	3–6.	
2007	Moscow	FIDE World Blitz Championship 2007	Blitz	15	12	11	20½/38	9.	
2007	Khanty-Mansiysk	Chess World Cup 2007 (Tie-Break against Arkadij Naiditsch)	Classical Rapid (25 min) Tie-break	6 2	1 0	5 0	Semi-finalist		
2008
2008	Wijk aan Zee	70th Corus Chess, grandmaster group A	Classical	5	2	6	8/13	1–2.	2830
2008	Solingen	Bundesliga, OSC Baden-Baden Board 4	Classical	1	0	1	1½/2		
2008	Linares, Jaén	25th Linares International Chess Tournament	Classical	5	3	6	8/14	2.	
2008	Nice	17th Amber chess tournament	Rapid Blindfold Rapid Combined				6/11 6/11 12/22	3–5. 5–9. 2–5.	
2008	Baku	FIDE Grand Prix Tournament, Baku 2008	Classical	4	1	8	8/13	1–3.	
2008	Mainz	Chess Classic Rapid Championship	Rapid					Finalist	
2008	Foros	3rd Aerosvit chess tournament	Classical	5	0	6	8/11	First	
2008	Miskolc	Rapid chess match against Peter Leko	Rapid	2	0	6	5:3	Win	
2008	Biel/Bienne	41st Biel Grandmaster Tournament	Classical	3	1	6	6/10	3	
2008	Moscow	3rd Tal Memorial Blitz	Blitz				21/34	3.	
2008	Bilbao	1st Grand Slam Masters Final	Classical	3	3	4	13/30	2–4.	
2008	Cap d'Agde	Cap d'Agde Rapid Tournament	Rapid				Semi-finalist		
2008	Halkidiki	24th European Chess Club Cup, Open section, MIKA Yerevan Board 1	Classical	2	2	2	3/6	18th (Team) 38th (Board 1)	2693
2008	Dresden	38th Chess Olympiad, Open event, Norway Board 1	Classical	5	1	5	7½/11	21st (Team) 10th (Board 1)	
2009
2009	Gjøvik	Aker Chess Challenge	Rapid	4	1	3		2.	
2009	Wijk aan Zee	71st Corus Chess, grandmaster group A	Classical	2	1	10	7/13	5–6	2740
2009	Linares, Jaén	26th Linares International Chess Tournament	Classical	3	2	9	7½/14	3.	
2009	Nice	18th Amber chess tournament	Rapid Blindfold Rapid Combined				6/11 7/11 13/22	5–6 1–3 4.	
2009	Sofia	5th M-Tel Masters	Classical	3	1	6	6/10	2–3	
2009	León	XXII Leon Rapid Tournament	Rapid Blitz Tie-break	2 2	2 0	4 3		Win	
2009	Dortmund	37th Sparkassen Chess Meeting	Classical	2	1	7	5½/10	2–4	
2009	Nanjing	2nd Pearl Spring chess tournament	Classical	6	0	4	8/10	First	
2009	Moscow	4th Tal Memorial	Classical	2	0	7	5½/9	2–3	
2009	Moscow	FIDE World Blitz Championship 2009	Blitz	28	8	6	31/42	First	
2009	London	1st London Chess Classic	Classical	3	0	4	13/21	First	
2010	Wijk aan Zee	72nd Corus Chess, grandmaster group A	Classical	5	1	7	8½/13	First	2822
2010	Nice	19th Amber chess tournament	Rapid Blindfold Rapid Combined				8/11 6½/11 14½/22	1–2 2–3 1–2	
2010	Mediaș	Kings Tournament	Classical	5	0	5	7½/10	First	
2010	Kristiansund	Arctic Securities Chess Stars	Rapid	4	1	4	6/9	Win	
2010	Khanty-Mansiysk	39th Chess Olympiad, Open event, Norway Board 1	Classical	4	3	1	4½/8	51 (Team) 25 (Board 1)	
2010	Bilbao	3rd Grand Slam Masters Final	Classical	1	2	3	6/18	3	
2010	Nanjing	3rd Pearl Spring chess tournament	Classical	4	0	6	7/10	First	
2010	Moscow	FIDE World Blitz Championship 2010	Blitz	19	10	9	23½/38	3	
2010	London	2nd London Chess Classic	Classical	4	2	1	13/21	First	
2011	Wijk aan Zee	73rd Tata Steel Chess, grandmaster group A	Classical	5	2	6	8/13	3–4	2821
2011	Monte Carlo	20th Amber chess tournament	Rapid Blindfold Rapid Combined				9½/11 5/11 14½/22	1 7–9 2	
2011	Mediaș	Kings Tournament	Classical	3	0	7	6½/10	First	
2011	Biel/Bienne	44th Biel Chess Festival, Grandmaster Tournament	Classical	5	1	4	19/30	First	
2011	Moscow	Botvinnik Memorial	Rapid	0	3	3	1½/6	4th (Last)	
2011	São Paulo – Bilbao	4th Grand Slam Masters Final	Classical Blitz Tie-break	3 1	1 1	6 0	15/30 1½:½	1–2 Win	
2011	Moscow	6th Tal Memorial	Classical	2	0	7	5½/9	First	
2011	London	3rd London Chess Classic	Classical	3	0	5	14/24	3	

=== 2012–2021 ===
Tournament and match results (2012–2021)
Year	City	Tournament	Time control	Wins	Losses	Draws	Points	Place	TPR
2012	Wijk aan Zee	74th Tata Steel Chess, grandmaster group A	Classical	4	1	8	8/13	2	2835
2012	Moscow	7th Tal Memorial Blitz	Blitz	6	2	1	6½/9	2	2935
2012	Moscow	7th Tal Memorial	Classical	2	0	7	5½/9	First	2849
2012	Astana	2012 FIDE World Rapid and Blitz Chess Championships	Rapid Blitz	8 16	2 7	5 7	10½/15 19½/30	2 2	
2012	Biel/Bienne	45th Biel Chess Festival, Exhibition Blitz and Grandmaster Tournament	Blitz (knockout) Classical (round-robin)	1 4	2 0	0 6	1:2 18/30	5–8 2	– 2881
2012	São Paulo – Bilbao	5th Grand Slam Masters Final	Classical Blitz Tie-break	4 2	1 0	5 0	17/30 2:0	1–2 Win	2878 –
2012	Mexico City	2nd UNAM Chess Festival (Blindfold tournament )	Rapid Semi-final Rapid final Blitz Tie-break	1 1 2	0 1 0	1 0 0	1½:½ 1:1 2:0	Win	
2012	Internet	game vs World from Mexico City via Internet		1	0	0	1:0	Win	
2012	London	4th London Chess Classic	Classical	5	0	3	18/24	First	2991
2013	Wijk aan Zee	75th Tata Steel Chess, grandmaster group A	Classical	7	0	6	10/13	1	2933
2013	London	2013 FIDE Candidates Tournament	Classical	5	2	7	8½/14	1	2854
2013	Sandnes	1st Norway Chess Supreme Masters Blitz	Blitz	5	2	2	6/9	2	2880
2013	Sandnes; Bryne – Sør-Hidle; Stavanger	1st Norway Chess Super Tournament	Classical	3	1	5	5½/9	2	2835
2013	Moscow	8th Tal Memorial	Blitz Classical	2 3	2 1	5 5	4½/9 5½/9	5 2	2767 2847
2013	Lillehammer	Rapid chess match against Borki Predojević	Rapid	1	0	3	2½:1½	Win	2711
2013	St. Louis	1st Sinquefield Cup	Classical	3	0	3	4½/6	First	2968
2013	Chennai	World Chess Championship match against Viswanathan Anand	Classical	3	0	7	6½:3½	Win	2885
2014	Zürich	Zurich Chess Challenge 2014	Blitz Classical Rapid Combined	2 3 1 4	1 0 2 2	2 2 2 4	3/5 8/10 2/5 10/15	1 1 4 First	2859 3027 2711 2860
2014	Caxias do Sul	Festival da Uva	Rapid (round robin) Rapid (knockout) Rapid (Swiss)	5 3 8	0 0 0	1 1 1	16/18 3½/4 8½/9	1 1 First	
2014	Oslo	Norwegian Team Championship Elite Series Qualification (1 game)	Classical	1	0	0	1/1	–	
2014	Şəmkir	1st Shamkir Chess in the memory of Vugar Gashimov, Group A	Classical	5	2	3	6½/10	First	2868
2014	Flor og Fjære, Sør-Hidle	2nd Norway Chess Blitz	Blitz	6	0	3	7½/9	First	3035
2014	Stavanger	2nd Unibet Norway Chess	Classical	1	0	8	5½/9	2	2841
2014	Dubai	2014 FIDE World Rapid and Blitz Chess Championships	Rapid Blitz	8 14	1 1	6 6	11/15 17/21	First First	
2014	Tromsø	41st Chess Olympiad, Open event, Norway Board 1	Classical	5	2	2	6/9	29 (Team) 6 (Board 1)	2799
2014	St. Louis	2nd Sinquefield Cup	Classical	2	1	7	5½/9	2	2822
2014	Sochi	World Chess Championship match against Viswanathan Anand	Classical	3	1	7	6½:4½	Win	2857
2015	Wijk aan Zee	77th Tata Steel Masters	Classical	6	1	6	9/13	First	2878
2015	Baden-Baden	3rd GRENKE Chess Classic	Classical Rapid Tie-break Blitz Tie-break Armageddon Tie-break	3 1 0 1	1 1 0 0	3 0 2 0	4½/7 1:1 1:1 1:0	First	2835 – – –
2015	Şəmkir	2nd Shamkir Chess in the memory of Vugar Gashimov	Classical	5	0	4	7/9	First	2984
2015	Stavanger	3rd Norway Chess	Blitz Classical	4 2	2 4	3 3	5½/9 3½/9	3 7	2851 2691
2015	St. Louis	3rd Sinquefield Cup	Classical	3	2	4	5/9	2	2831
2015	Berlin	2015 FIDE World Rapid and Blitz Chess Championships	Rapid Blitz	8 11	0 4	7 6	11½/15 14/21	1 6	
2015	Reykjavík	20th European Team Chess Championship, Open section, Norway Board 1	Classical	2	2	3	3½/7	21 (Team) 16 (Board 1)	2670
2015	London	7th London Chess Classic	Classical Rapid Tie-break	2 1	0 0	7 1	5½/9 1½:½	First	2859
2015	Doha	2nd Qatar Masters Open	Classical Blitz Tie-break	5 2	0 0	4 0	7/9 2:0	First	2887 –
2016	Wijk aan Zee	78th Tata Steel Masters	Classical	5	0	8	9/13	First	2881
2016	Stavanger	4th Altibox Norway Chess Blitz	Blitz	7	1	1	7½/9	1	3034
2016	Stavanger	4th Altibox Norway Chess	Classical	4	1	4	6/9	First	2886
2016	Internet	Internet Chess Club Open Final 2016	Blitz	3	2	2	4/7	3–4	2705
2016	Paris	Paris Grand Chess Tour Rapid and Blitz 2016	Rapid Blitz Combined	5 9 14	1 4 5	3 5 8	6½/9 11½/18 24½/36	2 1–2 2	2942 2878 2899
2016	Leuven	Your Next Move Grand Chess Tour Rapid and Blitz 2016	Rapid Blitz Combined	5 7 12	2 3 5	2 8 10	6/9 11/18 23/36	1 1 First	2910 2865 2880
2016	Bilbao	9th Bilbao Masters Final	Classical	4	1	5	17/30	First	2872
2016	Baku	42nd Chess Olympiad, Open event, Norway Board 1	Classical	5	0	5	7½/10	5 (Team) 6 (Board 1)	2805
2016	Internet	Chess.com Blitz Battle Championship 2016, Quarterfinal against Tigran L. Petrosian	Blitz and Bullet	20	3	2	21:4	Win	
2016	Internet	Chess.com Blitz Battle Championship 2016, Semi-final against Alexander Grischuk	Blitz and Bullet	14	6	4	16:8	Win	
2016	Internet	Chess.com Blitz Battle Championship 2016, Final against Hikaru Nakamura	Blitz and Bullet	12	8	5	14½:10½	Win	
2016	New York City	World Chess Championship match against Sergey Karjakin	Classical Rapid Tie-break	1 2	1 0	10 2	6:6 3:1	Win	2772 –
2016	Doha	2016 FIDE World Rapid and Blitz Chess Championships	Rapid Blitz	10 14	3 2	2 5	11/15 16½/21	3 2	
2017	Wijk aan Zee	79th Tata Steel Masters	Classical	4	1	8	8/13	2	2831
2017	Internet	Chess.com 2017 PRO Chess League	Rapid	28	2	6	31/36	(Team won)	
2017	Karlsruhe – Baden-Baden	4th GRENKE Chess Classic	Classical	1	0	6	4/7	3	2764
2017	Stavanger	5th Altibox Norway Chess Blitz	Blitz	6	0	3	7½/9	1	3066
2017	Stavanger	5th Altibox Norway Chess	Classical	1	2	6	4/9	9	2750
2017	Paris	Paris Grand Chess Tour Rapid and Blitz 2017	Rapid (25 min) Blitz Combined Rapid (10 min) Tie-break	5 8 13 1	0 6 6 0	4 4 8 1	7/9 10/18 24/36 1½:½	1 5 1–2 Win	2998 2820 2883 2939
2017	Leuven	Your Next Move Grand Chess Tour Rapid and Blitz 2017	Rapid Blitz Combined	3 12 15	1 1 2	5 5 10	5½/9 14½/18 25½/36	3 1 First	2851 3022 2965
2017	St. Louis	5th Sinquefield Cup	Classical	3	1	5	5½/9	2	2862
2017	Tbilisi	Chess World Cup 2017	Classical	4	1	1	4½/6	17–32	2732
2017	Douglas	2017 Chess.com Isle of Man International	Classical	6	0	3	7½/9	First	2903
2017	St. Louis	2017 Champions Showdown, rapid and blitz match against Ding Liren	Rapid (30 min) Rapid (20 min) Blitz (10 min) Blitz (5 min) Overall	1 3 6 6 16	0 0 1 1 2	3 3 1 5 12	2½:1½ 4½:1½ 6½:1½ 8½:3½ 67:25	Win	
2017	Internet	Chess.com 2017 Speed Chess Championship, Round of 16 against Gadir Guseinov	Blitz and Bullet	18	3	5	20½:5½	Win	
2017	Internet	Chess.com 2017 Speed Chess Championship, Quarterfinal against Wesley So	Blitz and Bullet	22	4	11	27½:9½	Win	
2017	Internet	Chess.com 2017 Speed Chess Championship, Semi-final against Alexander Grischuk	Blitz and Bullet	12	7	7	15½:10½	Win	
2017	London	9th London Chess Classic	Classical	2	1	6	5/9	3	2815
2017	Riyadh	2017 FIDE World Rapid and Blitz Chess Championships	Rapid Blitz	8 13	3 2	4 6	10/15 16/21	5 1	
2018	Internet	Chess.com 2017 Speed Chess Championship, Final against Hikaru Nakamura	Blitz and Bullet	14	5	8	18:9	Win	
2018	Wijk aan Zee	80th Tata Steel Masters	Classical Blitz Tie-break	5 1	0 0	8 1	9/13 1½:½	1	2885 –
2018	Bærum	Fischer Random Chess match against Hikaru Nakamura	Chess960 Rapid (45 min) Chess960 Blitz (10 min) Overall	3 3 6	2 1 3	3 4 7	4½:3½ 5:3 14:10	Win	
2018	Internet	Chess.com 2018 PRO Chess League	Rapid	26	3	3	27½/32		2822
2018	Karlsruhe – Baden-Baden	5th GRENKE Chess Classic	Classical	2	0	7	5½/9	2nd	2803
2018	Şəmkir	5th Shamkir Chess in the memory of Vugar Gashimov	Classical	3	0	6	6/9	First	2885
2018	Stavanger	6th Altibox Norway Chess Blitz	Blitz	2	1	6	5/9	4	2828
2018	Stavanger	6th Altibox Norway Chess	Classical	2	1	5	4½/8	2	2827
2018	Biel/Bienne	51st ACCENTUS Biel Grandmaster Tournament	Classical	3	1	6	6/10	2	2792
2018	St. Louis	6th Sinquefield Cup	Classical	2	0	7	5½/9	1st–3rd	2861
2018	Porto Carras	34th European Chess Club Cup, Open section, Vålerenga Sjakklubb Board 1 (6 games)	Classical	1	0	5	3½/6	5 (Team) 3 (Board 1)	2776
2018	London	World Chess Championship match against Fabiano Caruana	Classical Rapid Tie-break	0 3	0 0	12 0	6:6 3:0	Win	2832 –
2018	St. Petersburg	2018 FIDE World Rapid and Blitz Chess Championships	Rapid Blitz	9 13	3 0	3 8	10½/15 17/21	5th First	
2019	Wijk aan Zee	81st Tata Steel Masters	Classical	5	0	8	9/13	First	2888
2019	Şəmkir	6th Shamkir Chess in the memory of Vugar Gashimov	Classical	5	0	4	7/9	First	2991
2019	Karlsruhe – Baden-Baden	6th GRENKE Chess Classic	Classical	6	0	3	7½/9	First	2983
2019	Abidjan	2019 Côte d'Ivoire Rapid & Blitz	Rapid Blitz Combined	6 7 13	0 2 2	3 9 12	7½/9 11½/18 26½/36	1 2 First	
2019	Newburgh	Lindores Abbey Chess Stars Tournament	Rapid	1	0	5	3½/6	First	
2019	Stavanger	7th Altibox Norway Chess Blitz	Blitz	5	2	2	6/9	3rd	2899
2019	Stavanger	7th Altibox Norway Chess	Classical Armageddon Blitz	2 6	0 1	7 —	13½/18	First	2848 —
2019	Zagreb	2019 Croatia Grand Chess Tour	Classical	5	0	6	8/11	First	2948
2019	St. Louis	2019 Saint Louis Rapid & Blitz	Rapid Blitz Combined	3 6 9	4 6 10	2 6 8	4/9 9/18 17/36	5–8 4–5 6	
2019	St. Louis	7th Sinquefield Cup	Classical Rapid Tie-break Blitz Tie-break	2 0 0	0 0 2	9 2 0	6½/11 1:1 0:2	2nd Tied Loss	2838 — —
2019	Douglas	FIDE Grand Swiss Tournament 2019	Classical	4	0	7	7½/11	3rd–8th	2825
2019	Høvikodden	FIDE World Fischer Random Chess Championship, semi-final match against Fabiano Caruana	Chess960 Rapid (45 min) Chess960 Rapid (15 min) Overall	2 2 4	1 1 2	1 1 2	7½:4½ 5:3 12½:7½	Win	
2019	Høvikodden	FIDE World Fischer Random Chess Championship, final match against Wesley So	Chess960 Rapid (45 min) Chess960 Rapid (15 min) Overall	0 0 0	3 1 4	1 1 2	1½:10½ 1:3 2½:13½	Loss	
2019	Norway	Østlandsserien 2019/20 2 division A for Offerspill Sjakklubb 1 (2 games)	Classical	2	0	0	2/2		
2019	Kolkata	2019 Tata Steel India Rapid & Blitz	Rapid Blitz Combined	6 8 14	0 2 2	3 8 11	7½/9 12/18 27/36	1 1–2 First	
2019	London	11th London Chess Classic, semi-final match against Maxime Vachier-Lagrave	Classical Rapid (25 min) Blitz Rapid (10 min) Tie-break Overall	0 0 1 0 1	0 0 1 1 2	2 2 2 1 7	6:6 4:4 4:4 ½:1½ 14½:15½	Loss	
2019	London	11th London Chess Classic, 3rd place match against Levon Aronian	Classical Rapid (25 min) Blitz Overall	1 1 1 3	0 1 1 2	1 0 2 3	9:3 4:4 4:4 17:11	Win (3rd place)	
2019	Moscow	2019 FIDE World Rapid Chess Championships	Rapid	8	0	7	11½/15	First	
2019	Moscow	2019 FIDE World Blitz Chess Championship	Blitz Blitz Tie-break	13 1	1 0	7 1	16½/21 1½:½	1–2 Win	
2020	Wijk aan Zee	82nd Tata Steel Masters	Classical	3	0	10	8/13	2nd	2818
2020	Internet	Magnus Carlsen Invitational (Magnus Carlsen Chess Tour)	Rapid					Win	
2020	Internet	FIDE Online Steinitz Memorial	Blitz	9	3	6	12/18	First	
2020	Internet	Lindores Abbey Chess Challenge (Magnus Carlsen Chess Tour)	Rapid				Semi-finalist		
2020	Internet	Clutch Chess International knock-out	Rapid					Win	
2020	Internet	Chessable Masters 2020 (Magnus Carlsen Chess Tour)	Rapid					Win	
2020	Internet	Legends of Chess (Magnus Carlsen Chess Tour)	Rapid					Win	
2020	Internet	Magnus Carlsen Chess Tour Finals	Rapid					Win	
2020	Internet	St. Louis Chess 9LX	Chess960 Rapid	4	1	4	6/9	1st–2nd	
2020	Internet	2020 Saint Louis Rapid & Blitz	Rapid Blitz Combined	5 8 13	2 2 4	2 8 10	6/9 12/18 24/36	2nd 1–2 1st–2nd	
2020	Stavanger	8th Altibox Norway Chess	Classical Armageddon Blitz	5 3	2 0	3 —	19½/30	First	2853
2020	Internet	Skilling Open (Champions Chess Tour 2021)	Rapid				2nd (finalist)		
2020	Internet	Chess.com 2020 Speed Chess Championship	Blitz 5+2, Blitz 3+2 and Bullet 1+1				Semi-finalist		
2020	Internet	Airthings Masters (Champions Chess Tour 2021, 26–30 December 2020: preliminary round & quarterfinals)	Rapid				Quarter-finalist		
2021	Wijk aan Zee	83rd Tata Steel Masters	Classical	3	1	9	7½/13	6th	2770
2021	Internet	Opera Euro Rapid (Champions Chess Tour 2021)	Rapid				2nd (finalist)		
2021	Internet	Magnus Carlsen Invitational 2021 (Champions Chess Tour 2021)	Rapid				3rd (semi-finalist)		
2021	Internet	New in Chess Classic (Champions Chess Tour 2021)	Rapid					Win	
2021	Internet	FTX Crypto Cup 2021 (Champions Chess Tour 2021)	Rapid					Win	
2021	Internet	Goldmoney Asian Rapid (Champions Chess Tour 2021)	Rapid				3rd (semi-finalist)		
2021	Internet (from Pamplona)	San Fermin Mundial 2021	Blitz					Win	
2021	Sochi	Chess World Cup 2021	Classical Rapid (25 min) Tie-break Rapid (10 min) Tie-break Blitz Tie-break	8 1 1 2	0 1 1 0	6 4 0 0	3rd (semi-finalist)		2902 — — —
2021	Internet	Aimchess US Rapid 2021 (Champions Chess Tour 2021)	Rapid					Win	
2021	Stavanger	9th Altibox Norway Chess	Classical Armageddon Blitz	4 5	1 0	5 —	19½/30	First	2852
2021	Struga	36th European Chess Club Cup, Open section, Offerspill Chess Club Board 1 (3 games)	Classical	2	0	1	2½/3	13th (Team)	2839
2021	Internet	Champions Chess Tour 2021 Final	Rapid					First	
2021	Dubai	World Chess Championship match against Ian Nepomniachtchi	Classical	4	0	7	7½:3½	Win	
2021	Warsaw	2021 FIDE World Rapid Chess Championship	Rapid	7	1	5	9½/13	3rd	
2021	Warsaw	2021 FIDE World Blitz Chess Championship	Blitz	12	6	3	13½/21	12th	
Year	City	Tournament	Time control	Wins	Losses	Draws	Points	Place	TPR

=== Since 2022 ===
Tournament and match results (since 2022)
Year	City	Tournament	Time control	Wins	Losses	Draws	Points	Place	TPR
2022	Wijk aan Zee	84th Tata Steel Masters	Classical	6	0	7	9½/13	First	2904
2022	Internet	Airthings Masters 2022	Rapid					Win	
2022	Internet	Charity Cup	Rapid					Win	
2022	Internet (from Oslo)	Oslo Esports Cup	Rapid					3rd	
2022	Internet	Chessable Masters 2022	Rapid				Semi-finalist		
2022	Stavanger	10th Altibox Norway Chess	Blitz	4	2	3	5½/9	2nd	
2022	Stavanger	10th Altibox Norway Chess	Classical Armageddon Blitz	3 3	0 3	6 —	16½/27	First	2865
2022	Zagreb	2022 Croatia Rapid & Blitz	Rapid Blitz Combined	3 9 12	1 4 5	5 5 10	11/18 11½/18 22½/36	2nd 3rd First	
2022	Chennai	44th Chess Olympiad, Open event, Norway Board 1	Classical	6	0	3	7½/9	59 (Team) 3rd (Board 1)	2821
2022	Internet (from Miami)	FTX Crypto Cup 2022	Rapid					Win	
2022	St. Louis	9th Sinquefield Cup (withdrew after 3 games)	Classical	1	1	1		Withdrew	
2022	Internet	Julius Baer Generation Cup 2022	Rapid					Win	
2022	Mayrhofen	37th European Chess Club Cup, Open section, Offerspill Chess Club Board 1 (6 games)	Classical	4	0	2	5/6	7th (Team)	2889
2022	Internet	Aimchess Rapid 2022	Rapid				Semi-finalist		
2022	Reykjavík	FIDE World Fischer Random Chess Championship, Group B	Chess960 Rapid (25 min)	4	1	1	9/12	First	
2022	Reykjavík	semi-final match against Ian Nepomniachtchi	Chess960 Rapid (25 min)	1	3	0	1:3	Loss	
2022	Reykjavík	third-place match against Nodirbek Abdusattorov	Chess960 Rapid (25 min)	3	1	0	3:1	Win (3rd place)	
2022	Internet (from San Francisco)	Champions Chess Tour 2022 Final	Rapid					First	
2022	Internet	MrDodgy Invitational 2022	Blitz					Win	
2022	Internet	Chess.com Speed Chess Championship 2022	Blitz and bullet					2nd (finalist)	
2022	Almaty	2022 FIDE World Rapid Chess Championship	Rapid	8	1	4	10/13	First	
2022	Almaty	2022 FIDE World Blitz Chess Championship	Blitz	13	2	6	16/21	First	
2023	Wijk aan Zee	85th Tata Steel Masters	Classical	5	2	6	8/13	3rd	2816
2023	Internet	Airthings Masters 2023	Rapid					Win	
2023	Internet	Chessable Masters 2023	Rapid					3rd	
2023	Warsaw	2023 Poland Rapid and Blitz	Rapid Blitz Combined	2 11 13	1 1 2	6 6 12	10/18 14/18 24/36	5th First First	
2023	Stavanger	11th Altibox Norway Chess	Blitz	3	3	3	4½/9	7th	
2023	Stavanger	11th Altibox Norway Chess	Classical Armageddon Blitz	0 7	1 1	8 —	11½/27	6th	
2023	Dubai	Global Chess League, SG Alpine Warriors, Board 1 (10 games)	Rapid	4	2	4	6/10	4th (Team)	
2023	Zagreb	2023 Croatia Rapid and Blitz	Rapid Blitz Combined	4 14 18	2 2 4	3 2 5	11/18 15/18 26/36	3rd First First	
2023	Internet	Aimchess Rapid 2023	Rapid					Win	
2023	Internet	Chess.com Bullet Chess Championship 2023	Bullet					2nd (Finalist)	
2023	Baku	Chess World Cup 2023	Classical Rapid (25 min) Tie-break Rapid (10 min) Tie-break	8 1 1	1 0 0	5 3 1		Win	
2023	Internet	Julius Baer Generation Cup 2023	Rapid					Win	
2023	Internet	Chess.com Speed Chess Championship 2023	Blitz and bullet					Win	
2023	Internet	AI Cup 2023	Rapid					2nd (finalist)	
2023	Durrës	38th European Chess Club Cup, Open section, Offerspill Chess Club Board 1 (6 games)	Classical	4	0	2	5/6	1st (Team) 1st (Board 1)	2923
2023	Doha	Qatar Masters 2023	Classical	5	2	2	6/9	16th	2650
2023	Budva	20th European Team Chess Championship, Open section, Norway Board 1	Classical	5	0	3	6½/8	13th (Team) First (Board 1)	2827
2023	Internet (from Toronto)	Champions Chess Tour 2023 Final	Rapid					Win	
2023	Samarkand	2023 FIDE World Rapid Chess Championship	Rapid	7	0	6	10/13	First	
2023	Samarkand	2023 FIDE World Blitz Chess Championship	Blitz	12	1	8	16/21	First	
2024
2024	Internet	Chessable Masters 2024	Rapid					Win	
2024	Wangels	Freestyle Chess G.O.A.T. Challenge Preliminary Rapid round-robin	Chess960 Rapid	2	2	3	3½/7	5th	
2024	Wangels	Main event (knockout stage): classical Chess960 games	Chess960 Classical Rapid tie-breaks	3 2	1 0	2 0	4–2 2–0	Win	
2024	Karlsruhe	7th GRENKE Chess Classic Match for first place against Rapport	Rapid	5 1	1 0	4 1	7/10 1½–½	First Win	
2024	Warsaw	2024 Poland Rapid and Blitz	Rapid Blitz Combined	3 12 15	0 2 2	6 4 10	12/18 14/18 26/36	2nd First First	
2024	Internet	Chess.com Classic 2024	Rapid					2nd (finalist)	
2024	Casablanca	Casablanca Chess	Rapid	3	0	3	4½/6	First	
2024	Stavanger	12th Altibox Norway Chess	Classical Armageddon Blitz	3 5	1 1	6 —	17½/30	First	
2024	Internet	CrunchLabs Masters 2024	Rapid					4th	
2024	Almaty	2024 FIDE World Rapid and Blitz Team Championship, WR Chess Team	Rapid Blitz	6 9	1 1	1 1	6½/8 9½/11	3rd (Team) First (Team)	
2024	Internet	Chess.com Speed Chess Championship 2024	Blitz and bullet					Win	
2024	Budapest	45th Chess Olympiad, Open event, Norway Board 1	Classical	5	1	2	6/8	14th (Team) 3rd (Board 1)	2810
2024	Internet	Julius Baer Generation Cup 2024	Rapid					Win	
2024	Kolkata	2024 Tata Steel India Rapid & Blitz	Rapid Blitz	6 9	0 1	3 8	7½/9 13/18	First First	2951 2871
2024	Internet (from Oslo)	Champions Chess Tour 2024 Final	Rapid					Win	
2024	New York City	2024 FIDE World Rapid Chess Championship (withdrew after 8 rounds)	Rapid				5/8	Withdrew	
2024	New York City	2024 FIDE World Blitz Chess Championship	Blitz			Finalist, co-winner (shared title)			
2025	Hamburg	Bundesliga, St. Pauli Board 1 (2 games)	Classical	1	0	1	1½/2		
2025	Weissenhaus	Weissenhaus Freestyle Chess Grand Slam Preliminary Rapid round-robin	Chess960 Rapid	5	3	1	5½/9	4th	
2025	Weissenhaus	Knockout stage (Chess960 games with rapid tie-breaks)	Chess 960 Classical Rapid tie-break					3rd	
2025	Internet	Chessable Masters 2025	Rapid					Win	
2025	Paris	Paris Freestyle Chess Grand Slam Preliminary round	Chess 960 Rapid		Shared 1st (2nd by tie-break rules)				
2025	Paris	Knockout stage	Chess960 classical					Win	
2025	Karlsruhe	Grenke Freestyle Chess Open 2025	Chess 960 classical	9	0	0	9/9	First	3385
2025	Internet	Chess.com Classic 2025	Rapid					Win	
2025	Stavanger	13th Norway Chess	Classical Armageddon Blitz	3 2	1 4	6 —	16/30	First	2853
2025	Zagreb	2025 Croatia Rapid & Blitz	Rapid Blitz Combined	2 8 10	1 1 2	6 9 15	10/18 12½/18 22½/36	3rd First First	
2025	Las Vegas	Las Vegas Freestyle Chess Grand Slam Preliminary round	Chess 960 Rapid					5th	
2025	Las Vegas	Knockout stage	Chess960 classical					3rd	
2025	Internet (from Riyadh)	2025 Esports World Cup	Rapid					Win	
2025	St. Louis	Clutch Chess: Champions Showdown	Rapid	10	3	5	25½/36	First	
2025	Cape Town	Freestyle Chess Grand Slam Final	Chess 960 Rapid					2nd	
2025	Doha	2025 FIDE World Rapid Chess Championship	Rapid	9	1	3	10½/13	First	
2025	Doha	2025 FIDE World Blitz Chess Championship	Blitz					Win	
2025	Internet	Chess.com Speed Chess Championship 2025	Blitz and bullet					Win	
2026
2026	Weissenhaus	2026 FIDE Freestyle Chess World Championship	Chess 960 Rapid					Win	
2026	Karlsruhe	Grenke Freestyle Chess Open 2026	Chess 960 classical	5	0	4	7/9	3rd	
2026	Internet	2026 Chess.com Open	Rapid					Win	
2026	Malmö	31st TePe Sigeman Match for first place against Arjun Erigaisi	Classical Blitz Tie-Break	4 2	1 1	2 0	5/7 2–1	1st-2nd Win (1st place)	
2026	Oslo	14th Norway Chess	Classical Armageddon Blitz	3 2	4 1	3 —	13/30	4th	
2026	Internet (from Bangkok)	2026 ASEAN Esports Chess Cup	Rapid					Win	
2026	Hong Kong	2026 FIDE World Rapid and Blitz Team Championship, WR Chess Team	Rapid Blitz	2 8	4 1	2 0	3/8 8/9	17th (Team) 5th (Team)	
2026	Internet (from Paris)	2026 Esports World Cup	Rapid					Win	
2026	Bengaluru	Global Chess League, Alpine APL Pipers, Board 1		4	1	5	6½/10	2nd (Team)	
2026	Budapest	Total Chess World Championship, Swiss Stage	Blitz	5	0	4	7/9	First	
2026	Budapest	Total Chess World Championship, Group C	Classical	0	1	9	9/30	5th	
2026	Budapest	Knockout stage 5 (17th-20th place)	Classical, rapid and blitz					17th	
2026	London	London Chess Classic Super Rapid Open	Rapid						
Year	City	Tournament	Time control	Wins	Losses	Draws	Score	Place	TPR

== Honours ==
Carlsen won the Chess Oscars from 2009 to 2013. The Chess Oscar, organised by the Russian chess magazine 64, was awarded to the year's best player according to a worldwide poll of leading chess critics, writers, and journalists, but it was no longer awarded after 2013, as 64 ceased publication.

The Norwegian tabloid Verdens Gang (VG) has awarded Carlsen the "Name of the Year" (Årets navn) twice, in 2009 and 2013. VG also named him "Sportsman of the Year" in 2009, and he was additionally honored with the Open Class (Åpen klasse) and "Utøvernes pris" awards in 2013. Carlsen has also won the Folkets idrettspris, a people's choice award for "Sportsman of the Year" from the Norwegian newspaper Dagbladet, in 2009, 2012, 2013, 2014, and 2016.

In 2011, he was awarded the Peer Gynt Prize, a Norwegian prize awarded annually to "a person or institution that has achieved distinction in society".

In 2013, Time magazine named Carlsen one of the 100 most influential people in the world.

In 2020, Forbes named Carlsen the highest-earning esports player in the world.

Carlsen was named Player of the Year at the inaugural Chess.com Awards in 2020. He received the same honor again in 2021, 2023, and 2025.

At the centenary celebration of the International Chess Federation in 2024, Carlsen accepted the FIDE award for best player of the past century.

== Rating ==
Carlsen's Elo rating evolution from 2002 to 2023

In the January 2006 FIDE rankings, at the age of 15 years and 32 days, Carlsen attained a 2625 Elo rating, which made him the youngest person to surpass 2600 (the record has since been broken by Wesley So, Wei Yi, John M. Burke, and Yağız Kaan Erdoğmuş). In the July 2007 FIDE rankings, at the age of 16 years and 213 days, Carlsen attained a 2710 Elo rating, which made him the youngest person to surpass 2700 (the record has since been broken by Wei Yi and Erdoğmuş).

On 5 September 2008, after winning in round 4 of the Bilbao Masters, Carlsen, aged 17 years and 280 days old, briefly became No. 1 on the unofficial live ratings list. Carlsen's victory in the 2009 Nanjing Pearl tournament raised his FIDE rating to 2801, making him, aged 18 years and 336 days, at the time the youngest player ever to surpass 2800 (a record subsequently broken by Alireza Firouzja). The youngest before Carlsen to achieve this feat was Vladimir Kramnik at the age of 25, and up until this point only Kasparov, Topalov, Kramnik, and Anand had achieved a 2800+ rating.

The FIDE rankings in January 2010 recorded Carlsen's rating at 2810, which made him No. 1 rated player in the world. This meant that Carlsen became, at the age of 19 years and 32 days, the youngest ever world No. 1, as well as the first player from a Western nation to reach the top of the FIDE rankings since Bobby Fischer in 1971.

Carlsen lost the No. 1 ranking in November 2010, regained it in January 2011, lost it again in March 2011, and regained it in the July 2011 list. As of July 2026, he has held the number one position continuously since then; this is the longest that any player has held that rank continuously.

On the January 2013 FIDE rankings, Carlsen reached 2861, thus surpassing Garry Kasparov's 2851 record from July 1999. In the May 2014 rankings, Carlsen achieved an all-time high record of 2882, with a peak of 2889 on the live ratings list achieved on 21 April 2014. In August 2019 he equalled his peak FIDE rating of 2882.

As of July 2026, Carlsen is also ranked No. 1 in the FIDE rapid rating list with a rating of 2803, and No. 1 in the FIDE blitz rating list with a rating of 2860.

== Playing style ==
Carlsen had an aggressive style of play as a youth, and, according to Simen Agdestein, his play was characterised by "a fearless readiness to offer material for activity". As he matured, Carlsen found that this risky playing style was not as well suited against the elite of the chess world. When he started playing in top tournaments, he had trouble getting much out of the opening. To progress, Carlsen's style became more universal, capable of handling all sorts of positions well. He most commonly opens with 1.e4 or 1.d4, followed by 1.c4 and 1.Nf3, but has played a wide range of openings over the years to make it harder for opponents to prepare against him and reduce the effect of computer analysis. He said in 2015 that the middlegame is his favourite part of the game as it comes down to "pure chess".

In a 2016 interview, Anish Giri said: "Magnus and I are very close in terms of style, but in our approach to the game we're total opposites. Magnus tries to put the accent only on play, getting away from preparation, but for me preparation plays an enormous role."

[Carlsen] has been known to say that he isn't all that interested in opening preparation; his main forte is the middlegame, in which he manages to outplay many of his opponents with positional means. ... Carlsen's repertoire is aimed at avoiding an early crisis in the game. He invariably aims for middlegames that lend themselves to a strategic approach.

— Jan Timman, 2012

Garry Kasparov, who coached Carlsen from 2009 to 2010, said that Carlsen has a positional style similar to that of past world champions such as Anatoly Karpov, José Raúl Capablanca, and Vasily Smyslov, rather than the tactical style of Alexander Alekhine, Mikhail Tal, and Kasparov himself. In a 2013 interview, Peter Heine Nielsen said: "The days of big novelties are over, and that fits Magnus' style well." According to Carlsen, however, he does not have any preferences in playing style. Kasparov said in 2013 that "Carlsen is a combination of Karpov [and] Fischer. He gets his positions [and] then never lets go of that bulldog bite. Exhausting for opponents." Carlsen has also stated that he follows in the traditions of Karpov and Fischer, but additionally mentions Reuben Fine as a player who "was doing in chess similar to what I am doing".

Anand said of Carlsen in 2012: "Magnus has an incredible innate sense. ... The majority of ideas occur to him absolutely naturally. He's also very flexible, he knows all the structures and he can play almost any position." He also compared Carlsen to Boris Spassky in his prime, and stated that "Magnus can literally do almost everything." Kasparov expressed similar sentiments: "[Carlsen] has the ability to correctly evaluate any position, which only Karpov could boast of before him." In 2014, Fabiano Caruana spoke of Carlsen’s deep knowledge of the opponent's strengths and weaknesses: "In some positions you can't compete with him. Certain pawn structures he just plays like a machine. There are certain openings where I say, 'I just can't do that.' But OK, certain positions he's not as comfortable with. Just like any player, he can also play unconfidently." When asked in a 2016 interview whether Carlsen's style resembles his own, Karpov answered: "It is quite possible. He grew up when I was in power, and perhaps he studied my games. He can convert a minimal advantage into a real one."

In a 2012 interview, Vladimir Kramnik stated that Carlsen's "excellent physical shape" was a contributing factor to his success against other top players as it prevents "psychological lapses", which enables him to maintain a high standard of play over long games and at the end of tournaments, when the energy levels of others have dropped. Levon Aronian said in 2015: "Magnus' main secret is his composure and the absence of any soul-searching after mistakes during a game."

Carlsen's endgame prowess has been singled out for praise. Jon Speelman, analysing several of Carlsen's endgames from the 2012 London Classic (in particular, his wins against McShane, Aronian, and Adams), described what he calls the "Carlsen effect":

... through the combined force of his skill and no less important his reputation, he drives his opponents into errors. ... He plays on for ever, calmly, methodically and, perhaps most importantly of all, without fear: calculating superbly, with very few outright mistakes and a good proportion of the "very best" moves. This makes him a monster and makes many opponents wilt.

An artificial intelligence-based ranking system developed by Jean-Marc Alliot of the Institut de recherche en informatique de Toulouse ("Toulouse Computer Science Research Institute") compared the moves of chess world champions against those recommended by Stockfish. Based on probabilistic models derived from 26,000 games played by world champions since Wilhelm Steinitz, the system ranked Carlsen highest among world champions in terms of the likelihood of selecting the engine's top moves.

According to CAPS (Computer Aggregated Precision Score), a system created by Chess.com that compares players from different eras by finding the percentage of moves that matches that of a chess engine, Carlsen ranks highest among all world champions, demonstrating exceptional precision and consistency in his play.

== Notable games ==
- Magnus Carlsen vs Sipke Ernst, Corus Group C (2004), Wijk aan Zee NED, rd 12, Jan-24. Caro-Kann Defense: Classical Variation, main lines (B18). A 13-year-old Carlsen plays a brilliant attacking game, sacrificing a knight and rook for mate.
- Carlsen vs. Garry Kasparov, Reykjavík Rapid (2004), Queen's Gambit Declined: Cambridge Springs Defense (D52), ½–½. At the age of 13, Carlsen had serious winning chances in a rapid game against Kasparov, who was ranked No. 1 in the world at the time.
- Carlsen vs. Veselin Topalov, M-Tel Masters (2009), Semi-Slav Defense: General (D43), 1–0. This was Carlsen's first win against a 2800+ player.
- Carlsen vs. Boris Gelfand, Tal Memorial (2011), Slav Defense: Quiet Variation. Schallopp Defense (D12), 1–0. The No. 1 Israeli player creates a seemingly decisive rook invasion into White's back rank, but Carlsen vanquishes the threats. Carlsen called it "one of the most interesting games I have played in recent times".
- Carlsen vs. Viswanathan Anand, Bilbao Masters (2012), Sicilian Defense: Canal Attack. Main Line (B52), 1–0. Playing against the then-World Champion, Carlsen sacrifices a pawn to leave Black with a cramped position, which leads to Anand's resignation at move 30. Carlsen stated in 2013 that he considers this game to be one of his very best.
- Magnus Carlsen vs Boris Gelfand, World Championship Candidates (2013), London ENG, rd 10, Mar-27. Sicilian Defense: Nezhmetdinov-Rossolimo Attack (B30). Carlsen sees 28.Qa5! from afar to justify the improving move 23.b4!!
- Magnus Carlsen vs Chao Li, Qatar Masters (2015), Doha QAT, rd 5, Dec-24. Neo-Grünfeld Defense: Goglidze Attack (D70), 1–0. Carlsen defuses a dangerous attack from his opponent with accurate play and a sham queen sacrifice, reaching a winning position when the dust settles.
- Carlsen vs. Ian Nepomniachtchi, 2021 World Championship game 6 (2021), Queen's Pawn Game, Symmetrical Variation, Pseudo-Catalan, 1–0. Game 6 was a 136-move win for Carlsen that lasted 7 hours 45 minutes. As of 2025, it is the longest game in the history of the World Chess Championship, surpassing the previous record, a 124-move draw in game 5 of the World Chess Championship 1978 between Anatoly Karpov and Viktor Korchnoi.

== Business endeavours ==
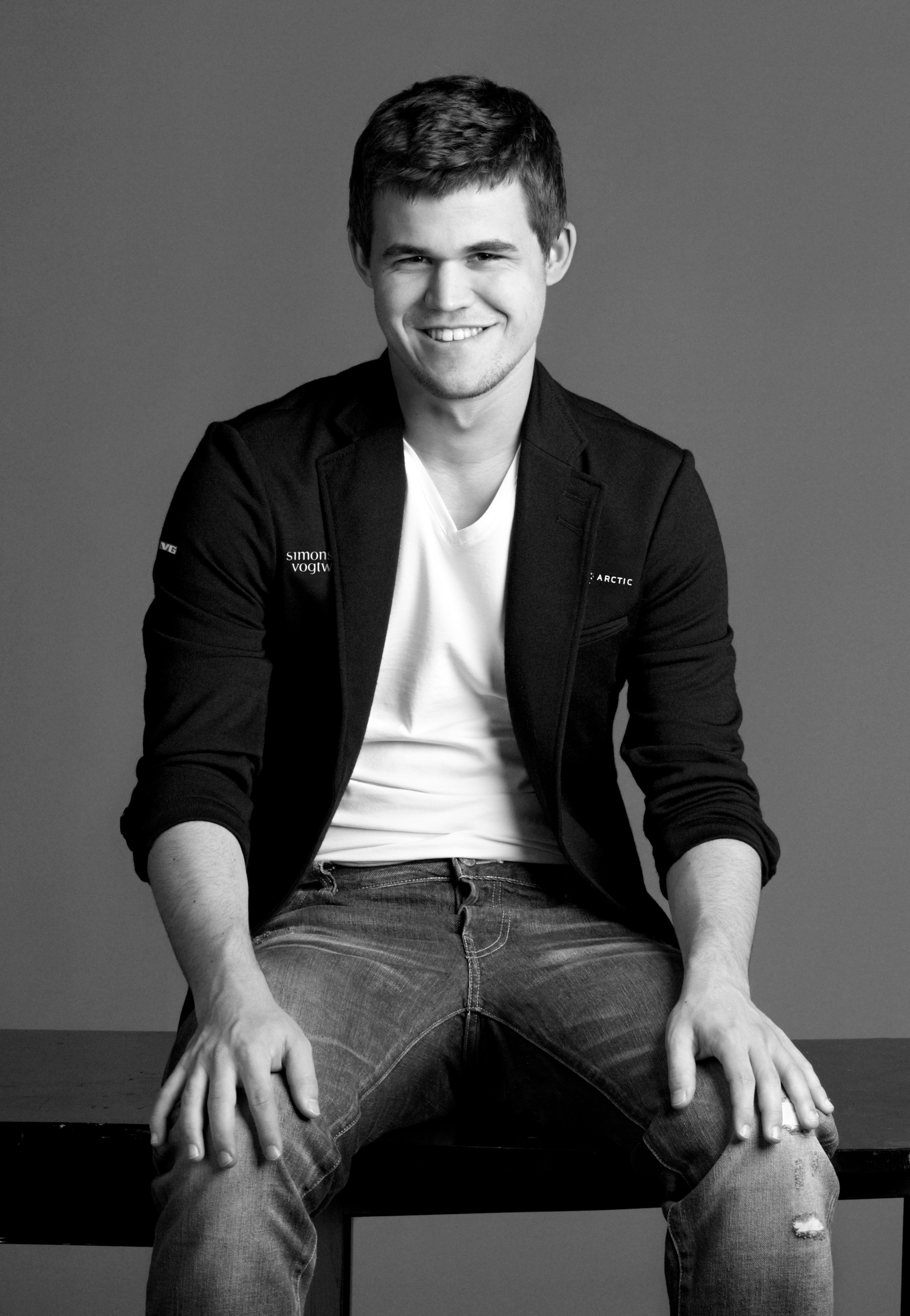
Carlsen in May 2013

Carlsen modelled for G-Star Raw's Fall/Winter 2010 advertising campaign along with American actress Liv Tyler. The campaign was shot by Dutch film director and photographer Anton Corbijn. The campaign was coordinated with the RAW World Chess Challenge in New York, an event in which Carlsen played an online team of global chess players, who voted on moves suggested by Maxime Vachier-Lagrave, Hikaru Nakamura and Judit Polgár. Carlsen, playing white, won in 43 moves. In February 2014, he appeared in G-Star Raw's Spring/Summer 2014 campaign along with actress and model Lily Cole.

Film director J. J. Abrams offered Carlsen a role in the movie Star Trek Into Darkness as "a chess player from the future", but Carlsen was unable to get a work permit in time for shooting. In 2012, Carlsen was featured in a 60 Minutes segment and appeared as a guest on The Colbert Report. He was also interviewed by Rainn Wilson for SoulPancake in 2013.

As of 2012, Carlsen is the only active chess professional with a full-time manager; Espen Agdestein, a FIDE Master and brother of Carlsen's former trainer Simen Agdestein, began working as an agent for Carlsen in late 2008. Agdestein's work consisted initially of finding sponsors and negotiating media contacts but, since 2011, he has taken over management tasks formerly performed by Carlsen's father Henrik. According to The New York Times, Carlsen earned US$1.2 million in 2012, the bulk of which was from sponsorships.

In August 2013, Carlsen became an ambassador for Nordic Semiconductor, and in November was selected as one of the "sexiest men of 2013" by Cosmopolitan. In 2017, Carlsen made a special guest appearance on The Simpsons in an episode where Homer's chess history is revealed.

In 2019, Carlsen supported an offer by the Kindred Group to pay the Norwegian Chess Federation 5 million Euros over five years in exchange for lobbying for the removal of the ban on private gambling companies in Norway. Offerspill Chess Club was founded by Carlsen to gain delegates to vote for accepting Kindred's offer. Free membership resulted in the club gaining 1,000 members, making it the largest chess club in Norway with 40 votes allocated to it in the upcoming congress. Carlsen's action was widely condemned in the Norwegian chess community as an attempt to buy out the vote. The Bergen Chess Club published an open letter calling this an "attack on democracy". In response to the criticism, Carlsen withdrew his delegates from the vote. The Kindred offer was rejected by the Norwegian Chess Congress 132-44. NRK had published an article revealing that Magnus Barstad had bought the domain for Offerspill. Barstad was a consultant for Kindred's parent company Unibet. NRK also stated that Carlsen had multiple connections to the gambling industry though figures at Play Magnus and his sponsor law firm Simonsen Vogt Wiig. Carlsen's manager Agdestein stated that this was a "coincidence".

In 2020, Carlsen announced that he had signed a two-year sponsorship deal with gambling company Unibet to act as a "global ambassador". In April 2022, the Kindred Group (through Unibet) extended its partnership with Carlsen for another two years, and also extended its sponsorship of Offerspill.

In October 2024, Carlsen became a global brand ambassador for BETBY. In December 2024, Carlsen became the official chess ambassador for the Esports World Cup, an esports tournament series that takes place in Saudi Arabia, as part of the introduction of chess in the 2025 edition.

=== Play Magnus ===
In October 2013, Carlsen co-founded a company, Play Magnus AS, with Espen Agdestein and Anders Brandt. Based in Oslo, Norway, Play Magnus' first product was an iOS app, called Play Magnus, that allows the user to play a chess engine created using a database of thousands of Carlsen's recorded games from the age of five and up. Carlsen stated he wished for the app to encourage more people to play chess.

In March 2019, Play Magnus AS merged with chess24.com, consolidating into the Play Magnus Group. On 8 October 2020, Play Magnus Group was listed on the Oslo Stock Exchange. Magnus Chess, an entity controlled by Carlsen and his family, then owned 9.5% of Play Magnus Group.

In August 2022, Chess.com finalised an offer of acquisition for Play Magnus Group, which officially closed on 16 December 2022. As part of the acquisition, Carlsen signed as a brand ambassador for Chess.com.

=== Take Take Take ===
In October 2024, Carlsen cofounded Take Take Take. It was the first app in Chess World which offered text-based commentary to fantasy chess, from live games to post-game recaps, and from challenges to some app exclusive content. Take Take Take then partnered with Chess.com to jointly organise Champions Chess Tour Finals in December 2024.

In April 2026, Take Take Take, in partnership with Lichess launched their own Chess Platform.

== Personal life ==
In 2016, Carlsen identified as a social democrat and stated mostly follows a vegetarian diet; two of his sisters are vegetarians.

Carlsen is an avid football fan, with Real Madrid CF as his favourite club. In recognition of becoming world chess champion, he took the honorary kick-off in a La Liga game between Real Madrid and Real Valladolid on 30 November 2013. Carlsen also follows the Premier League and plays fantasy football. In December 2019, he reached the No. 1 spot on a Fantasy Premier League game, ahead of seven million other players, before eventually finishing the season in 10th place. Carlsen also plays poker.

Carlsen married Ella Victoria Malone in a private ceremony at Holmenkollen Chapel in the Vestre Aker borough of Oslo, Norway, on 4 January 2025. On 27 September 2025, Ella gave birth to a boy.

== Books and films ==
- Grandmaster Zenon Franco (2020). Magnus Wins With White. [Limited Liability Company Elk and Ruby Publishing House]. ISBN 978-5604-17701-3.
- Grandmaster Zenon Franco (2020). Magnus Wins With Black. [Limited Liability Company Elk and Ruby Publishing House]. ISBN 978-5604-46925-5.
- Valaker, O; Carlsen, M. (2004). Lær sjakk med Magnus [Learn Chess with Magnus]. Gyldendal Norsk Forlag. ISBN 978-82-05-33963-7.
- The Prince of Chess, a film about Magnus Carlsen (2005). Directed by Øyvind Asbjørnsen.
- Opedal, Hallgeir (2011). Smarte trekk. Magnus Carlsen: Verdens beste sjakkspiller [Smart Moves. Magnus Carlsen: The World's Best Chess Player]. Kagge. ISBN 978-82-489-1050-3.
- Mikhalchishin, Adrian; Stetsko, Oleg. (2012). Fighting Chess with Magnus Carlsen (Progress in Chess). Edition Olms. ISBN 978-3-283-01020-1.
- Crouch, Colin (2013). Magnus Force: How Carlsen Beat Kasparov's Record. Everyman Chess. ISBN 978-1-78194-133-1.
- Sivertsen, Aage G. (2015). Magnus Kagge Forlag. ISBN 978-82-489-1659-8.
- Kotronias, Vassilios & Logothetis, Sotiris (2013). Carlsen's assault on the throne. Quality Chess. ISBN 978-1-906552-22-0.
- Butler, Brin-Jonathan (2018). The Grandmaster: Magnus Carlsen and the Match That Made Chess Great Again. ISBN 978-1-501172601.
- Magnus (2016). Directed by Benjamin Ree.

== See also ==
- List of chess players by peak FIDE rating
- List of chess grandmasters
- List of world records in chess

== Notes ==
Achievements
Preceded by Viswanathan Anand	World Chess Champion; 2013–2023	Succeeded by Ding Liren
Preceded by Leinier Domínguez; Lê Quang Liêm; Sergey Karjakin; Maxime Vachier-Lagrave	World Blitz Chess Champion; 2009; 2014; 2017–2021; 2022–present	Succeeded by Levon Aronian; Alexander Grischuk; Maxime Vachier-Lagrave; Incumbent
Preceded by Shakhriyar Mamedyarov; Daniil Dubov; Nodirbek Abdusattorov; Volodar Murzin	World Rapid Chess Champion; 2014–2015; 2019–2021; 2022–2024; 2025–present	Succeeded by Vasyl Ivanchuk; Nodirbek Abdusattorov; Volodar Murzin; Incumbent
Preceded by Veselin Topalov; Viswanathan Anand; Viswanathan Anand	World No. 1; 1 January 2010 – 31 October 2010; 1 January 2011 – 28 February 2011; 1 July 2011–present	Succeeded by Viswanathan Anand; Viswanathan Anand; Incumbent
Preceded by Tora Berger	Norwegian Sportsperson of the Year; 2013	Succeeded by Ole Einar Bjørndalen
