= Grand Slam Chess Association =

Chess tournaments (2007–2012)

The Grand Slam Chess Association was a series of annual chess tournaments since 2007 till 2012.

== List of tournaments ==
Tournaments of the Grand Slam Chess Association were:

- Pearl Spring chess tournament, held in October in Nanjing, China
- Tata Steel Chess Tournament (formerly the Corus chess tournament), usually in January in a small town called Wijk aan Zee, North Holland, Netherlands
- Bazna Kings Tournament, held in June in Romania
- Linares International Chess Tournament, around the end of February, in Linares, Jaén province, Andalusia, Spain; not held since 2010
- M-Tel Masters, usually in May, in Sofia, the capital of Bulgaria; not held since 2009
- Grand Slam Masters Final, the winner of each tournament automatically qualified to finals, which was held in September in Bilbao, Spain.

== Presidential board ==
During the Presidential board meeting of the GSCA (Grand Slam Chess Association) in Linares on 7 March 2009, the GSCA Presidential board was chosen:

- Juan Fernandez (Linares) – President
- Silvio Danailov (Sofia) – Executive Director
- Jeroen van den Berg (Wijk aan Zee) – Spokesman
- Andoni Madallaga (Bilbao) – General Secretary

== History ==
Negotiations between the organisers of major tournaments M-Tel Masters, Tata Steel Chess Tournament (under the name Corus) and Linares began in March 2006, seeking to create a cycle of tournaments to raise the popularity of chess and attract increased sponsorship for major events. Several rounds of talks took place over the next 14 months.

The GSCA was established on 17 January 2007, and the first edition of the series for 2008 announced in May, with Mexico City added to the list and Bilbao confirmed as Masters Final hosts. Due to problems raising funding for the tournament, it was announced on 16 May 2008 that Mexico City was cancelled.

On 16 March 2009, the members of the GSCA Presidential Board was published, confirming the addition of Pearl Spring in Nanjing, China as Grand Slam hosts as well as interest from San Luis, Argentina and London. The M-Tel Masters was held for the last time during this series.

During the 2010 series, marking the last edition of Linares due to financial problems and the cancellation of M-Tel Masters due to the World Chess Championship, held in Sofia that year, it was agreed that Kings Tournament held in Medias, Romania would join the 2011 edition.

For the Bilbao Chess Masters Final 2010, the qualifiers were Magnus Carlsen (winner of the 2009 Pearl Spring, 2010 Corus and 2010 Bazna King tournaments) and Veselin Topalov (winner of 2010 Linares). Because the M-Tel Masters was cancelled in 2010 due to the World Chess Championship 2010, the winner of the World Chess Championship, Viswanathan Anand was named an automatic qualifier. After Topalov withdrew from the final, the remaining two places were decided during a preliminary tournament in China in early September involving Vladimir Kramnik, Levon Aronian (the highest two rated players not having already qualified for the final), Alexei Shirov (nominee of host nation Spain) and Wang Hao (nominee of host nation China). Shirov and Kramnik qualified for the final. The final was the strongest tournament (by rating) in chess history, and it was won by Kramnik, followed by Anand, Carlsen and Shirov.

For the 2011 Grand Slam final, the qualifiers to date are Carlsen (winner of 2010 Pearl Spring), Hikaru Nakamura (winner of 2011 Tata Steel), Sergey Karjakin (second of 2011 Bazna Kings, Carlsen is winner), World Chess Champion Viswanathan Anand and Levon Aronian (the highest rated player not having already qualified for the final). The remaining place has yet to be determined. Karjakin didn't participate. Ivanchuk replaced him. Vallejo Pons, host player, was the last.

At the end of the 2012 edition of Tata Steel the rest of the 2012 series was confirmed and announced that the 2011 winners of Tal Memorial and London Chess Classic qualified for the 2012 Bilbao Final. This would be the last Grand Slam cycle, later editions composed of invitees by the Bilbao Masters organising committee.
