= Corus Chess Tournament 2006 =

Chess tournament in the Netherlands

- Venue: Wijk aan Zee

The Corus Chess Tournament 2006 was the 68th edition of the Corus Chess Tournament. It was held in Wijk aan Zee in January 2006 and was won jointly by Viswanathan Anand and Veselin Topalov.

68th Corus Chess Tournament, grandmaster group A, 14–29 January 2006, Wijk aan Zee, Cat. XIX (2716)
	Player	Rating	1	2	3	4	5	6	7	8	9	10	11	12	13	14	Total	SB	TPR
1	Viswanathan Anand (India)	2792		½	½	1	1	1	½	1	½	1	1	½	0	½	9	58.50	2851
2	Veselin Topalov (Bulgaria)	2801	½		0	½	½	1	½	½	1	1	1	½	1	1	9	54.00	2850
3	Michael Adams (England)	2707	½	1		1	0	½	½	½	½	½	½	½	1	½	7½	48.75	2773
4	Vasyl Ivanchuk (Ukraine)	2729	0	½	0		½	1	½	½	1	½	½	½	1	1	7½	44.50	2772
5	Boris Gelfand (Israel)	2723	0	½	1	½		½	½	½	½	½	1	½	0	1	7	43.75	2744
6	Sergey Karjakin (Ukraine)	2660	0	0	½	0	½		½	½	½	½	1	1	1	1	7	38.50	2749
7	Sergei Tiviakov (Netherlands)	2669	½	½	½	½	½	½		½	½	½	0	½	1	½	6½	41.75	2719
8	Peter Leko (Hungary)	2740	0	½	½	½	½	½	½		½	0	½	1	1	½	6½	39.25	2714
9	Levon Aronian (Armenia)	2752	½	0	½	0	½	½	½	½		0	½	1	1	1	6½	37.50	2713
10	Loek van Wely (Netherlands)	2647	0	0	½	½	½	½	½	1	1		½	½	0	½	6		2692
11	Étienne Bacrot (France)	2717	0	0	½	½	0	0	1	½	½	½		½	1	½	5½		2659
12	Shakhriyar Mamedyarov (Azerbaijan)	2709	½	½	½	½	½	0	½	0	0	½	½		0	½	4½	31.00	2606
13	Gata Kamsky (United States)	2686	1	0	0	0	1	0	0	0	0	1	0	1		½	4½	28.50	2608
14	Ivan Sokolov (Netherlands)	2689	½	0	½	0	0	0	½	½	0	½	½	½	½		4		2577

68th Corus Chess Tournament, grandmaster group B, 14–29 January 2006, Wijk aan Zee, Cat. XV (2602)
	Player	Rating	1	2	3	4	5	6	7	8	9	10	11	12	13	14	Total	SB	TPR
1	GM Alexander Motylev (Russia)	2638		1	0	1	½	1	½	1	½	1	1	½	½	½	9	58.25	2741
2	GM Magnus Carlsen (Norway)	2625	0		½	½	½	½	1	1	1	1	½	1	½	1	9	53.00	2742
3	GM Zoltán Almási (Hungary)	2646	1	½		0	½	0	½	1	0	1	1	1	1	1	8½		2709
4	GM Baadur Jobava (Georgia)	2614	0	½	1		½	1	½	1	0	0	½	1	1	1	8		2689
5	GM David Navara (Czech Republic)	2660	½	½	½	½		0	½	½	½	½	1	1	1	½	7½		2655
6	GM Ivan Cheparinov (Bulgaria)	2625	0	½	1	0	1		½	1	0	½	0	½	1	1	7	41.50	2630
7	GM Erwin l'Ami (Netherlands)	2550	½	0	½	½	½	½		0	½	1	1	½	½	1	7	41.25	2635
8	GM Arkadij Naiditsch (Germany)	2657	0	0	0	0	½	0	1		1	½	1	1	1	1	7	35.75	2627
9	GM Alexander Beliavsky (Slovenia)	2626	½	0	1	1	½	1	½	0		½	½	½	½	0	6½		2601
10	GM Giovanni Vescovi (Brazil)	2633	0	0	0	1	½	½	0	½	½		½	1	1	½	6	33.25	2571
11	GM Humpy Koneru (India)	2537	0	½	0	½	0	1	0	0	½	½		1	1	1	6	31.25	2578
12	GM Jan Smeets (Netherlands)	2550	½	0	0	0	0	½	½	0	½	0	0		1	1	4		2465
13	GM Daniël Stellwagen (Netherlands)	2573	½	½	0	0	0	0	½	0	½	0	0	0		1	3		2394
14	IM Kateryna Lagno (Ukraine)	2500	½	0	0	0	½	0	0	0	1	½	0	0	0		2½		2359

68th Corus Chess Tournament, grandmaster group C, 14–29 January 2006, Wijk aan Zee, Cat. IX (2458)
	Player	Rating	1	2	3	4	5	6	7	8	9	10	11	12	13	14	Total	SB	TPR
1	GM Suat Atalık (Turkey)	2618		½	1	½	1	1	½	½	1	1	1	½	1	1	10½		2696
2	IM Jan Werle (Netherlands)	2514	½		½	½	1	½	½	1	1	0	1	1	½	1	9	54.75	2594
3	GM Cyril Marcelin (France)	2441	0	½		½	1	0	1	½	½	1	1	1	1	1	9	50.50	2600
4	GM John van der Wiel (Netherlands)	2505	½	½	½		1	½	½	½	½	½	½	½	1	1	8		2541
5	GM Li Shilong (China)	2543	0	0	0	0		1	1	1	1	1	½	1	0	1	7½		2508
6	IM Yge Visser (Netherlands)	2485	0	½	1	½	0		½	½	0	1	1	0	1	½	6½	39.75	2455
7	GM Klaus Bischoff (Germany)	2560	½	½	0	½	0	½		½	1	½	½	1	1	0	6½	39.25	2450
8	GM Karel van der Weide (Netherlands)	2466	½	0	½	½	0	½	½		1	1	½	0	½	1	6½	38.75	2457
9	GM Harmen Jonkman (Netherlands)	2470	0	0	½	½	0	1	0	0		1	½	½	1	½	5½		2400
10	Pieter Hopman (Netherlands)	2332	0	1	0	½	0	0	½	0	0		½	1	½	1	5	28.75	2380
11	WGM Ekaterina Atalik (Turkey)	2399	0	0	0	½	½	0	½	½	½	½		½	½	1	5	27.25	2375
12	GM Ahmed Adly (Egypt)	2473	½	0	0	½	0	1	0	1	½	0	½		0	½	4½		2346
13	WIM Marlies Bensdorp (Netherlands)	2230	0	½	0	0	1	0	0	½	0	½	½	1		0	4		2334
14	IM Yochanan Afek (Israel)	2370	0	0	0	0	0	½	1	0	½	0	0	½	1		3½		2289
