= Pearl Spring chess tournament =

Chinese chess tournament

Tournament information
- Sport: Chess
- Location: Nanjing, China
- Established: 2008
- Defunct: 2010
- Format: Round-robin tournament
- Most championships: (Norway) Magnus Carlsen (2)

Final champion
- (Norway) Magnus Carlsen

The Pearl Spring Chess Tournament (simplified Chinese: 中国（南京）国际象棋超级大赛; traditional Chinese: 中國（南京）國際象棋超級大賽; pinyin: Zhōngguó（Nánjīng）guójì xiàngqí chāojí dà sài) was a double round robin chess tournament event featuring six super-GM players that took place in Nanjing, Jiangsu, China three times between 2008 and 2010. The first edition in December 2008 was won by Veselin Topalov. The 2009 and 2010 editions were both won by Magnus Carlsen.

Together with Corus Chess Tournament in the Netherlands, Linares Chess Tournament in Spain, M-Tel Masters in Bulgaria, and Grand Slam Masters Final in Spain, Nanjing Pearl Spring Chess Tournament was one of the five "Grand Slam" tournaments. It was the first in Asia and the only one in China.

== Venue ==
The tournament was named after the venue, the Mingfa Pearl Spring Hotel located in Pukou District of Nanjing.

== Organization ==
The tournament was organized by the Municipal People's Government of Nanjing and Chess & Cards Administration Center of General Administration of Sport of China, and the People's Government of Pukou District, Nanjing, and Nanjing Administration of Sport

- Tournament Director: Wang Yonghong
- Chief arbiter: Casto Abundo
- Arbiters: Tang Jianming, Feng Zhe, Zhang Jilin

The organization web site did not disclose the player invitation criteria or protocol. In each of the first three years, one participant was of Chinese nationality.

== Sponsorship ==
The tournament was sponsored by Jiangsu Kanion Pharmaceutical Co., Ltd., Yangzi Evening News, and Mundell International University of Entrepreneurship. The total prize fund was €250,000 with a first prize of €80,000.

== Support ==
The tournament has received support from FIDE, the European Chess Union (ECU) and the Asian Chess Federation.

== Guests ==
Guests invited to the opening ceremony included Kirsan Ilyumzhinov, President of the World Chess Federation; Boris Kutin, President of ECU; Sheikh Sultan, President of ACU and Liang Zhirong, Secretary-General of FIDE, Xu Jialu, Vice-chairman of the Standing Committee of the National People's Congress and Nobel Prize winner, Robert A. Mundell.

== Results ==
=== 2008 ===
10-22 December

The six players were Veselin Topalov of Bulgaria (Elo rating 2791, ranked first in the world); Vassily Ivanchuk of Ukraine (Elo rating 2786, ranked third in the world); Levon Aronian of Armenia (Elo rating 2757, ranked seventh in the world); Sergei Movsesian of Slovakia (Elo rating 2732, ranked thirteenth in the world); Peter Svidler of Russia (Elo rating 2727, ranked seventeenth in the world); Bu Xiangzhi of China (Elo rating 2714, ranked twenty-sixth in the world). With at least an Elo rating average of 2751.6, it was a category 21 tournament making it the strongest chess tournament ever held in China.

1st Pearl Spring, 11–21 December 2008, Nanjing, China, Category XXI (2751)
	Player	Rating	1	2	3	4	5	6	Points	TPR	Place
1	Veselin Topalov (Bulgaria)	2791		½ 1	½ ½	1 1	½ 1	½ ½	7	2892	1
2	Levon Aronian (Armenia)	2757	½ 0		½ ½	½ ½	1 1	½ ½	5½	2786	2
3	Bu Xiangzhi (China)	2714	½ ½	½ ½		½ 0	½ 0	1 1	5	2758	3
4	Peter Svidler (Russia)	2727	0 0	½ ½	½ 1		½ ½	0 1	4½	2720	4
5	Vassily Ivanchuk (Ukraine)	2786	½ 0	0 0	½ 1	½ ½		½ ½	4	2672	5–6
6	Sergei Movsesian (Slovakia)	2732	½ ½	½ ½	0 0	1 0	½ ½		4	2683	5–6

=== 2009 ===
September 27 - October 9 (Category 21, 2764)

The 2009 edition of the Pearl Spring tournament is notable for Magnus Carlsen's dominant victory, attaining an unprecedented tournament performance rating of 3002 - the highest ever recorded to that point. In doing so, Carlsen became the fourth and youngest chess player ever to reach 2800 Elo.

2nd Pearl Spring, 28 September – 9 October 2009, Nanjing, China, Category XXI (2764)
	Player	Rating	1	2	3	4	5	6	Points	SB	TPR
1	Magnus Carlsen (Norway)	2772		1 ½	½ 1	1 ½	1 ½	1 1	8		3002
2	Veselin Topalov (Bulgaria)	2813	0 ½		½ ½	½ ½	½ 1	½ 1	5½		2789
3	Wang Yue (China)	2736	½ 0	½ ½		½ ½	½ ½	½ ½	4½		2733
4	Teimour Radjabov (Azerbaijan)	2757	0 ½	½ ½	½ ½		½ ½	½ 0	4	20.00	2693
5	Peter Leko (Hungary)	2762	0 ½	½ 0	½ ½	½ ½		½ ½	4	19.25	2692
6	Dmitry Jakovenko (Russia)	2742	0 0	½ 0	½ ½	½ 1	½ ½		4	17.25	2696

=== 2010 ===
The 3rd edition of the tournament took place from October 19 to October 30; with at least an Elo rating average of 2766, it was a category 21 tournament.

3rd Pearl Spring, 20–30 October 2010, Nanjing, China, Category XXI (2766)
	Player	Rating	1	2	3	4	5	6	Points	SB	TPR
1	Magnus Carlsen (Norway)	2826		½ ½	1 ½	½ ½	1 1	1 ½	7		2903
2	Viswanathan Anand (India)	2800	½ ½		0 1	½ ½	1 ½	½ 1	6		2831
3	Étienne Bacrot (France)	2716	0 ½	1 0		1 ½	½ 0	1 ½	5		2776
4	Vugar Gashimov (Azerbaijan)	2719	½ ½	½ ½	0 ½		½ ½	½ ½	4½	23.00	2739
5	Veselin Topalov (Bulgaria)	2803	0 0	0 ½	½ 1	½ ½		½ 1	4½	19.50	2722
6	Wang Yue (China)	2732	0 ½	½ 0	0 ½	½ ½	½ 0		3		2623

== See also ==
- List of strong chess tournaments
- Grand Slam Chess Association
- Dortmund Sparkassen Chess Meeting
- Association of Chess Professionals
- Chess around the world
- FIDE Grand Prix 2008–2009
