= Danailov =

Danailov (Bulgarian: Данаилов, masculine) or Danailova (Bulgarian: Данаилова, feminine) is a Bulgarian surname derived from the personal name Danail. Notable people with the surname include:

- Silvio Danailov (born 1961), Bulgarian chess player and manager
- Stefan Danailov (1942–2019), Bulgarian actor and politician
- Dobromira Danailova (born 1995), Bulgarian recurve archer
