= Bilbao Chess Masters Final =

Spanish chess tournament (2008–2016)

- Genre: Double round robin chess tournament
- Frequency: Annual
- Locations: Bilbao, Spain
- Inaugurated: 2008
- Most recent: 2016
- Website: http://www.bilbaomastersfinal.com/en

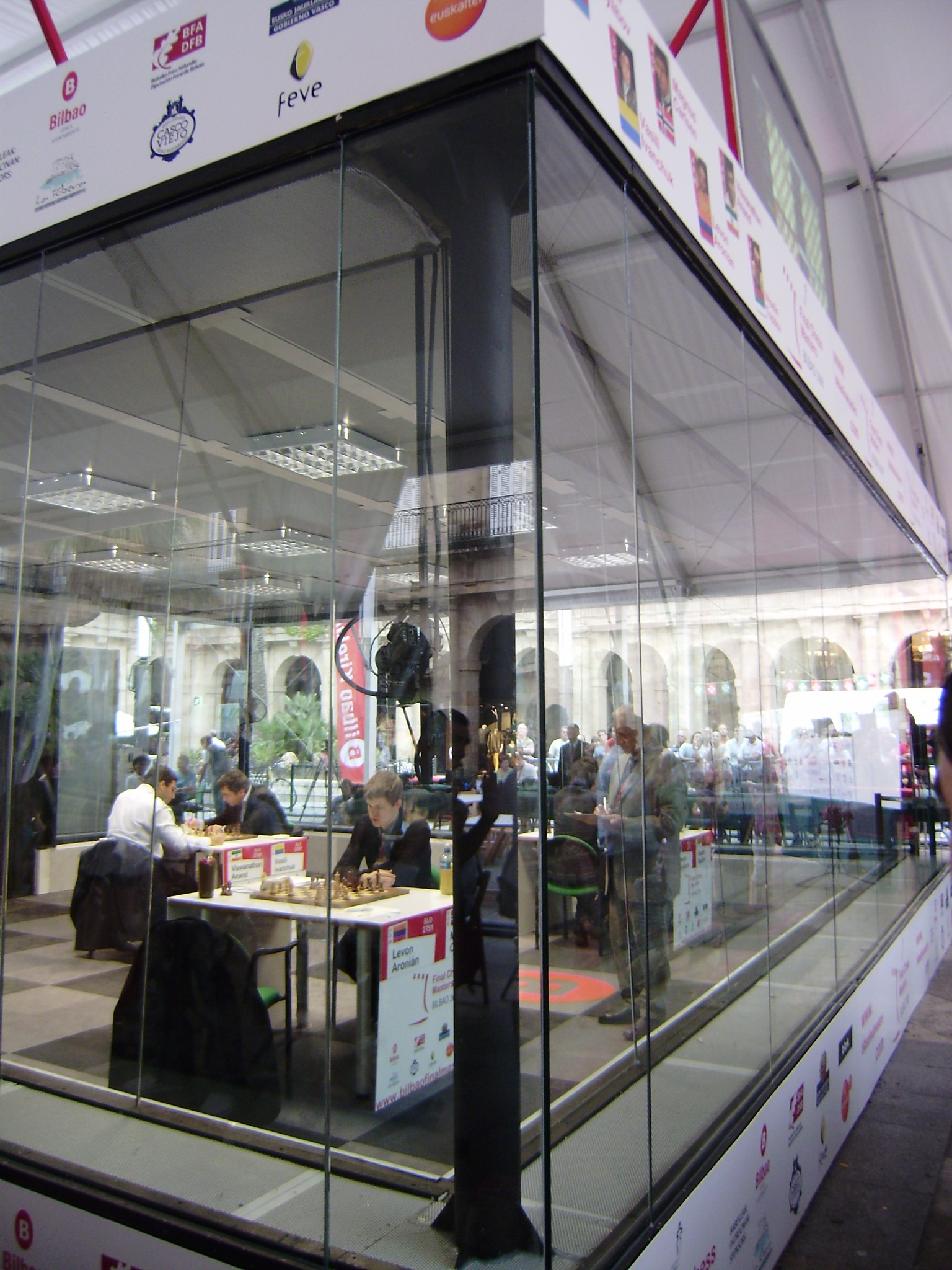
Bilbao Chess Masters Final 2008. Glass-enclosed playing venue on the Plaza Nueva, Bilbao.

The Bilbao Chess Masters Final (previously called the Grand Slam Chess Final) was an annual chess tournament which between 2008 and 2012 brought together the strongest players from the previous year's "Grand Slam" events. Series organisers Grand Slam Chess Association (GSCA) became defunct in 2012 due to the demise of the Grand Slam hosts and scheduling problems but the Bilbao Masters continued as an annual invitational event until 2016.

== Grand Slam Chess Association ==
Negotiations between the organisers of major tournaments M-Tel Masters, Tata Steel Chess Tournament (under the name Corus) and Linares began in March 2006, seeking to create a cycle of tournaments to raise the popularity of chess and attract increased sponsorship for major events. Several rounds of talks took place over the next 14 months.

The GSCA was established on 17 January 2007 and the first edition of the series for 2008 announced in May, with Mexico City added to the list and Bilbao confirmed as Masters Final hosts. Due to problems raising funding for the tournament, it was announced on 16 May 2008 that Mexico City was cancelled.

On 16 March 2009, the members of the GSCA Presidential Board was published, confirming the addition of Pearl Spring in Nanjing, China as Grand Slam hosts as well as interest from San Luis, Argentina and London. The M-Tel Masters was held for the last time during this series.

During the 2010 series, marking the last edition of Linares due to financial problems and the cancellation of M-Tel Masters due to the World Chess Championship, held in Sofia that year, it was agreed that Kings Tournament held in Medias, Romania would join the 2011 edition.

At the end of the 2012 edition of Tata Steel the rest of the 2012 series was confirmed and announced that the 2011 winners of Tal Memorial and London Chess Classic qualified for the 2012 Bilbao Final. This would be the last Grand Slam cycle, later editions composed of invitees by the Bilbao Masters organising committee.

An ongoing problem was conflicting schedules between Grand Slam hosts and FIDE. For the 2013 series, invitees Carlsen and Anand declined spots in the Bilbao final due to their preparations for the World Championship.

== Format and venue ==
The tournament is a double round robin featuring four to six players. The tournament regulations use the Sofia Chess Rules, which forbids agreed draws before 30 moves, and the "Bilbao" scoring system of 3 points for a win, 1 for a draw and 0 for a loss (though for ratings purposes the traditional scoring method is used).

The venue for the tournament has traditionally been the city of Bilbao in Spain. In year 2011 and 2012 a second venue was added as São Paulo in Brazil with one of the round-robins in each city. A soundproofed and air-conditioned glass "cube" was constructed to house the tournament, allowing spectators to watch closely the players inside.

== Winners ==
#	Year	Winner
1	2008	(Bulgaria) Veselin Topalov
2	2009	(Armenia) Levon Aronian
3	2010	(Russia) Vladimir Kramnik
4	2011	(Norway) Magnus Carlsen
5	2012	(Norway) Magnus Carlsen
6	2013	(Armenia) Levon Aronian
7	2014	(India) Viswanathan Anand
8	2015	(United States) Wesley So
9	2016	(Norway) Magnus Carlsen

== Tournaments ==
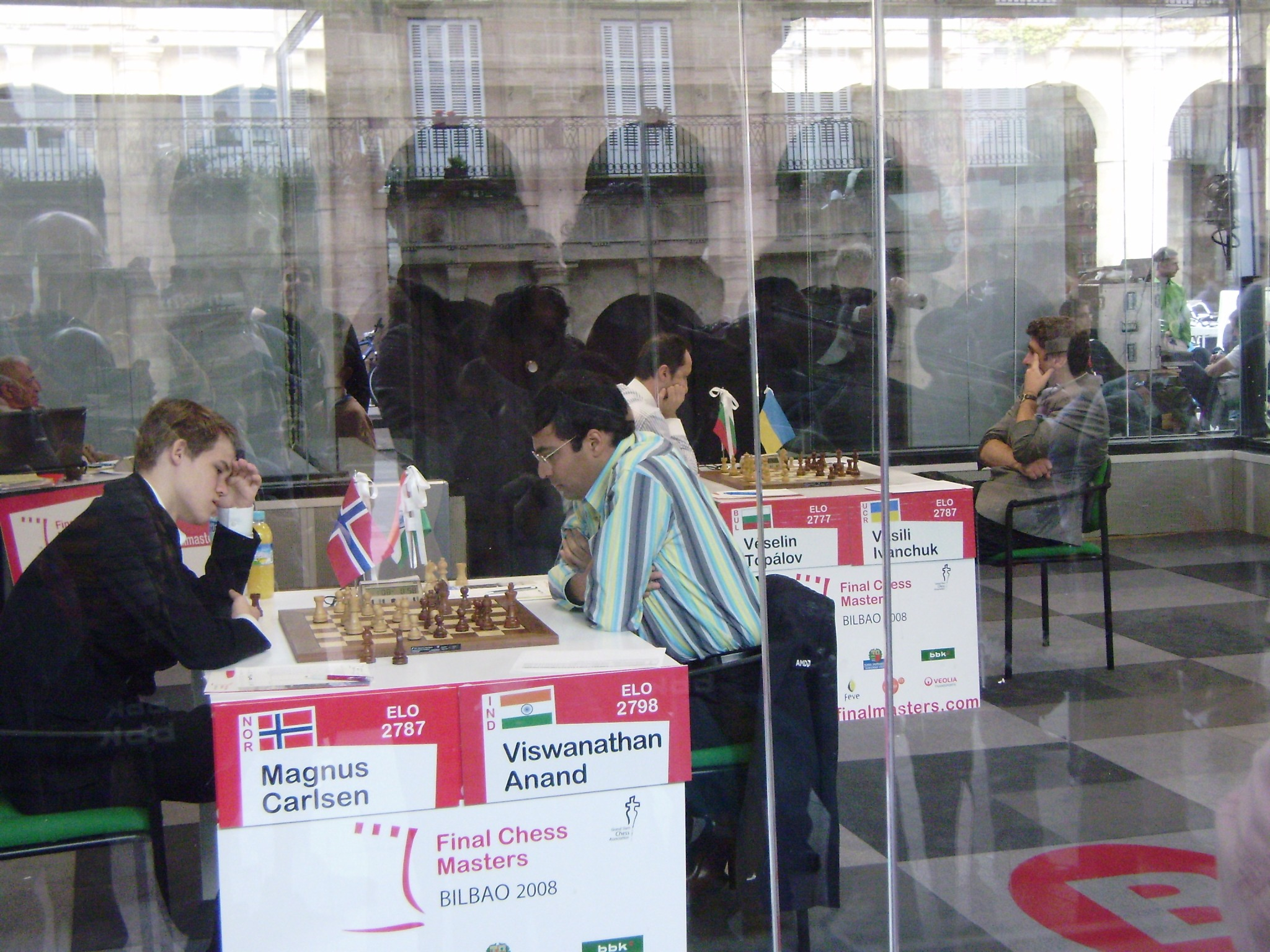
Carlsen playing Anand, Bilbao 2008

=== 1st Grand Slam Masters Final (2008) ===
The inaugural Final was composed of Tata Steel joint winners Magnus Carlsen and Levon Aronian, Linares winner Viswanathan Anand, M-Tel Masters winner Vassily Ivanchuk, M-Tel runner up Veselin Topalov and third placed Teimour Radjabov.

Topalov convincingly won the tournament with 17 points, Carlsen beating Aronian to second place. Had Topalov lost to Ivanchuk and Carlsen defeated Anand in the last round, there would have been a tiebreak rapid match. Anand finished in last place ahead of his World Championship defence against Vladimir Kramnik.

I Grand Slam Final, 2–13 September 2008, Bilbao, Spain, Category XXI (2769)
	Player	Rating	1	2	3	4	5	6	Points	SScr	H2H	TPR
1	Veselin Topalov (Bulgaria)	2777		3 3	1 0	1 3	1 1	3 1	17			2877
2	Magnus Carlsen (Norway)	2775	0 0		3 3	1 0	3 1	1 1	13	5	2	2767
3	Levon Aronian (Armenia)	2737	1 3	0 0		3 1	1 0	1 3	13	5	0	2775
4	Vassily Ivanchuk (Ukraine)	2781	1 0	1 3	0 1		1 3	1 1	12			2766
5	Teimour Radjabov (Azerbaijan)	2744	1 1	0 1	1 3	1 0		1 1	10			2737
6	Viswanathan Anand (India)	2798	0 1	1 1	1 0	1 1	1 1		8			2690

=== 2nd Grand Slam Masters Final (2009) ===
The second Final consisted of Sergey Karjakin, the winner of 2009 Corus, Alexander Grischuk, winner of Linares, Alexei Shirov, winner in M-Tel Masters, and Aronian, second place at Pearl Spring, replacing Topalov who declined the invitation.

Aronian emerged as the clear winner, winning the event with one round to spare.

II Grand Slam Masters Final, 6–12 September 2009, Bilbao, Cat. XX (2740)
	Player	Rating	1	2	3	4	Points	TPR
1	Levon Aronian (Armenia)	2773		0 3	3 1	3 3	13	2921
2	Alexander Grischuk (Russia)	2733	3 0		0 1	3 1	8	2741
3	Sergey Karjakin (Ukraine)	2722	0 1	3 1		1 1	7	2745
4	Alexei Shirov (Spain)	2730	0 0	0 1	1 1		3	2549

=== 3rd Grand Slam Masters Final (2010) ===
The third edition featured four players and took place in the Alhóndiga Bilbao. It was a category 22 tournament, the highest rated tournament in history. Qualifiers for the Final were Carlsen (winner of Corus, Bazna Kings and Pearl Springs events) and Anand who was seeded through due to the cancellation of M-Tel Masters that year. Topalov had qualified as winner of Linares 2010 but withdrew from the Final.

A tournament was held in Shanghai, China consisting of Kramnik, Aronian, Shirov and Wang Hao in order to fill the two spots. Alexei Shirov and Vladimir Kramnik - by defeating Aronian in an armageddon tie-break game - qualified. Kramnik then went on to win the Masters Final.

Shanghai Masters 2010, 3–8 September 2010, Shanghai, China, Cat. XXI (2759)
	Player	Rating	1	2	3	4	Points	TB	TPR
1	Alexei Shirov (Spain)	2749		1 3	1 1	3 3	12		2955
2	Vladimir Kramnik (Russia)	2780	1 0		1 3	1 1	7	1+A	2752
3	Levon Aronian (Armenia)	2783	1 1	1 0		3 1	7	1	2751
4	Wang Hao (China)	2724	0 0	1 1	0 1		3		2578

Second place tiebreak, 8 September 2010, Shanghai, China
Player	Rating	Blitz		Armageddon	Place
Vladimir Kramnik (Russia)	2780	1	0	1	2
Levon Aronian (Armenia)	2783	0	1	0	3

III Grand Slam Masters Final, 9–15 October 2010, Bilbao, Cat. XXII (2789)
	Player	Rating	1	2	3	4	Points	TPR
1	Vladimir Kramnik (Russia)	2780		1 1	3 1	3 1	10	2917
2	Viswanathan Anand (India)	2800	1 1		3 1	1 1	8	2842
3	Magnus Carlsen (Norway)	2826	0 1	0 1		1 3	6	2719
4	Alexei Shirov (Spain)	2749	0 1	1 1	1 0		4	2677

=== 4th Grand Slam Masters Final (2011) ===
In contrast to Grand Slam Masters Finals in the last years, the organizers decided to return to a six-player double round robin without a special qualification tournament. The first half of the fourth edition was played in São Paulo from September 25 to October 1, and the second in Bilbao from October 5 to October 11.

The players invited to the Grand Slam Masters Final 2011 were Anand as second-place at Pearl Spring and the Tata Steel, Carlsen, as winner of Bazna and Pearl Spring, Hikaru Nakamura as winner of Tata Steel and Aronian as highest rated player not qualified, third in the FIDE ratings. Kramnik, the winner of the 2010 Final, and Karjakin, second at Bazna - declined to play and were replaced by Ivanchuk and local player Francisco Vallejo Pons.

Carlsen dominated the Bilbao half of the 4th Final Masters and finished level with Ivanchuk who played so well in the first half. Carlsen won the event after defeating Ivanchuk in a blitz playoff 1.5-0.5.

IV Final Masters, 26 September – 11 October 2011, São Paulo—Bilbao, Category XXII (2780)
	Player	Rating	1	2	3	4	5	6	Points	TB	SScr	H2H	TPR
1	Magnus Carlsen (Norway)	2823		3 3	1 1	1 1	1 1	0 3	15	1½			2843
2	Vassily Ivanchuk (Ukraine)	2765	0 0		1 3	3 1	3 1	3 0	15	½			2819
3	Hikaru Nakamura (United States)	2753	1 1	1 0		1 3	1 1	3 0	12		5	2½	2785
4	Levon Aronian (Armenia)	2807	1 1	0 1	1 0		1 3	3 1	12		5	2	2774
5	Viswanathan Anand (India)	2817	1 1	0 1	1 1	1 0		3 3	12		5	1½	2772
6	Francisco Vallejo Pons (Spain)	2716	3 0	0 3	0 3	0 1	0 0		10				2683

First place tiebreak, 11 October 2011, Bilbao
Player	Rating	Blitz		Place
Magnus Carlsen (Norway)	2823	½	1	1
Vassily Ivanchuk (Ukraine)	2765	½	0	2

=== 5th Grand Slam Masters Final (2012) ===
The format was a six-player double round robin. The first half of the fifth edition was played in São Paulo from September 24 to September 29, and the second in Bilbao from October 8 to October 13.

After Carlsen and Fabiano Caruana tied for first place a tiebreak match took place, which Carlsen won 2–0.

V Final Masters, 24 September – 13 October 2012, São Paulo—Bilbao, Cat. XXII (2781)
	Player	Rating	1	2	3	4	5	6	Points	TB	TPR
1	Magnus Carlsen (Norway)	2843		0 3	1 1	1 1	1 3	3 3	17	2	2878
2	Fabiano Caruana (Italy)	2773	3 0		1 3	3 1	1 1	3 1	17	0	2892
3	Levon Aronian (Armenia)	2816	1 1	1 0		3 1	1 1	1 1	11		2774
4	Sergey Karjakin (Russia)	2778	1 1	0 1	0 1		1 1	1 3	10		2745
5	Viswanathan Anand (India)	2780	1 0	1 1	1 1	1 1		1 1	9		2745
6	Francisco Vallejo Pons (Spain)	2697	0 0	0 1	1 1	1 0	1 1		6		2649

First place tiebreak, 13 October 2012, Bilbao
Player	Blitz rating	Blitz		Place
Magnus Carlsen (Norway)	2856	1	1	1
Fabiano Caruana (Italy)	2718	0	0	2

=== 6th Grand Slam Masters Final (2013) ===
The sixth Grand Slam Chess Masters final was held on 7–12 October in Bilbao as a double round robin with four players.

VI Bilbao Masters Final, 7–12 October 2013, Bilbao, Spain, Category XXI (2762)
	Player	Rating	1	2	3	4	Points	SScr	TPR
1	Levon Aronian (Armenia)	2795		1 3	1 1	1 3	10		2876
2	Michael Adams (England)	2753	1 0		1 1	3 3	9		2822
3	Shakhriyar Mamedyarov (Azerbaijan)	2759	1 1	1 1		0 1	5	2½	2706
4	Maxime Vachier-Lagrave (France)	2742	1 0	0 0	3 1		5	2	2644

=== 7th Grand Slam Masters Final (2014) ===
The seventh Grand Slam Chess Masters was held from 14 to 20 September in Bilbao as a double round robin with four players. Viswanathan Anand emerged as the winner.

VII Grand Slam Masters Final, 12–20 September 2014, Bilbao, Spain, Category XXI (2755)
	Player	Rating	1	2	3	4	Points	SScr	H2H	Koya	SB	TPR
1	Viswanathan Anand (India)	2785		1 0	3 1	3 3	11					2869
2	Levon Aronian (Armenia)	2804	1 3		3 1	1 1	10					2863
3-4	Ruslan Ponomariov (Ukraine)	2717	0 1	0 1		3 0	5	2	1	1	6.00	2642
3-4	Francisco Vallejo Pons (Spain)	2712	0 0	1 1	0 3		5	2	1	1	6.00	2643

=== 8th Grand Slam Masters Final (2015) ===
The eighth Masters tournament was held from 26 October to 1 November in Bilbao as a double round robin with four players. Wesley So won the tournament after beating Anish Giri in a tiebreak match (blitz playoff).

VIII Grand Slam Masters Final, 26 October – 1 November 2015, Bilbao, Spain, Category XXII (2786)
	Player	Rating	1	2	3	4	Points	TB	SScr	H2H	Koya	SB	TPR
1	Wesley So (United States)	2760		1 1	1 1	3 1	8	1½					2851
2	Anish Giri (Netherlands)	2798	1 1		1 3	1 1	8	½					2838
3-4	Viswanathan Anand (India)	2803	1 1	1 0		1 1	5		2½	1	1½	7.75	2723
3-4	Ding Liren (China)	2782	0 1	1 1	1 1		5		2½	1	1½	7.75	2730

First place tiebreak, 1 November 2015, Bilbao
Player	Blitz rating	Blitz		Place
Wesley So (United States)	2726	1	½	1
Anish Giri (Netherlands)	2793	0	½	2

=== 9th Grand Slam Masters Final (2016) ===
The ninth Bilbao Masters Final was held on 13–23 July as a six-player double round-robin with Magnus Carlsen, Hikaru Nakamura, Anish Giri, Sergey Karjakin, Wesley So and Wei Yi taking part. As in previous Bilbao Masters tournaments, the scoring was 3 points for a win, 1 point for a draw, and 0 points for a loss.

The games between Magnus Carlsen and Sergey Karjakin were highly anticipated, as they would face off at the World Championship match in November; because Norway and Russia were not paired with each other in the 2016 Chess Olympiad, this was the last time the two played each other prior to the World Championship match. Hikaru Nakamura defeated Magnus Carlsen for the first time in standard time controls in the first round and Magnus Carlsen defeated Anish Giri for the first time in standard time controls in the penultimate round.

IX Bilbao Masters Final, 13–23 July 2016, Bilbao, Basque Country, Spain, Category XXII (2778)
	Player	Rating	1	2	3	4	5	6	Points	SScr	H2H	Koya	SB	TPR
1	Magnus Carlsen (Norway)	2855		0 1	3 1	3 1	3 1	1 3	17					2872
2	Hikaru Nakamura (United States)	2787	3 1		1 1	1 1	1 1	1 1	12					2811
3-4	Wesley So (United States)	2770	0 1	1 1		1 1	1 1	1 3	11	5	2	1	51.00	2779
3-4	Wei Yi (China)	2696	0 1	1 1	1 1		1 1	1 3	11	5	2	1	51.00	2794
5	Sergey Karjakin (Russia)	2773	0 1	1 1	1 1	1 1		1 1	9					2742
6	Anish Giri (Netherlands)	2785	1 0	1 1	1 0	1 0	1 1		7					2666
