= Silvio Danailov =

Bulgarian chess player (born 1961)

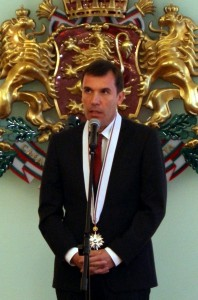

Personal information
- Born: 21 April 1961 (age 65) Sofia, Bulgaria

Chess career
- Country: Bulgaria
- Title: International Master (1984)
- FIDE rating: 2425 (July 2026)
- Peak rating: 2475 (January 1991)

Silvio Danailov (Bulgarian: Силвио Данаилов; born 21 April 1961) is a Bulgarian chess player and International Master. He was a manager and coach of the Bulgarian men's national chess team (1993–2000) and manager and coach of two former FIDE world chess champions, GM Veselin Topalov (BUL) and GM Ruslan Ponomariov (UKR).

Silvio Danailov was Honorary President of the European Chess Union (ECU) from 2014 until he resigned as such a year later, President of the European Chess Union (2010–2014) and Member of FIDE Presidential Board (2010–2014).

== Biography ==
He is an entrepreneur of chess competitions and founder of the Grand Slam chain of tournaments in 2006, which included Wijk aan Zee (Holland), Linares (Spain), MTel Masters (Bulgaria), Nanjing (China) with the Final Masters tournament in Bilbao (Spain).

Silvio Danailov implemented the famous anti-draw rules called the Sofia Rules, which were introduced for the first time in the MTel Masters tournament in 2005. The rule states: "The players should not offer draws directly to their opponents. Draw-offers will be allowed only through the Chief-Arbiter in three cases: a triple-repetition of the position, a perpetual check and in theoretically drawn positions." Sofia rules make the chess games and tournaments more attractive to the general audience, media and sponsors.

Silvio Danailov's company Kaissa Chess Management has organized many world top chess events such as; MTel Masters super tournament in Sofia, Bulgaria (five times, 2005–2009), the Candidates match for FIDE World Championship Topalov - Kamsky in Sofia (2009) and the World Championship match Anand - Topalov in Sofia (2010), and many European chess championships.

He is fluent in English, Spanish, Russian, Serbo-Croatian languages and Thai.

In 2011, Silvio Danailov was awarded with the highest Bulgarian state award – the Order of Stara Planina 1st class by the President Georgi Parvanov for "his exceptional contribution to the Republic of Bulgaria in the field of physical education and sport."

Danailov led the campaign for endorsement of the ECU's Chess in school program by the European Parliament in Strasbourg on March 13, 2012. The Written Declaration 50/2011 for the implementation of the 'Chess in School' programme among the schools in the European Union was signed by 415 MEPs.

Silvio Danailov was involved in several controversies such as the bathroom controversy during the World Chess Championship match in 2006 between Kramnik and Topalov, when he served as Topalov's manager.

In September 2016, the ethics commission of the international chess organization FIDE sanctioned Danailov and two other chess officials because of alleged financial irregularities. Danailov was suspended from holding any position within FIDE for 18 months. According to a timeline of facts published by FIDE, there were financial and administrative irregularities during the organisation of the 2013 European Youth Chess Championship in Budva which included the establishment of a company in Delaware that acted as an impostor to receive payments for the European Chess Union. A number of other allegations and the failure of the Bulgarian Chess Federation (BCF) to cooperate with the investigation led the European Chess Union to suspend the membership of BCF in September 2016.
