= World Chess Championship 2010 =

Chess match between Viswanathan Anand and Veselin Topalov

	Defending champion	Challenger
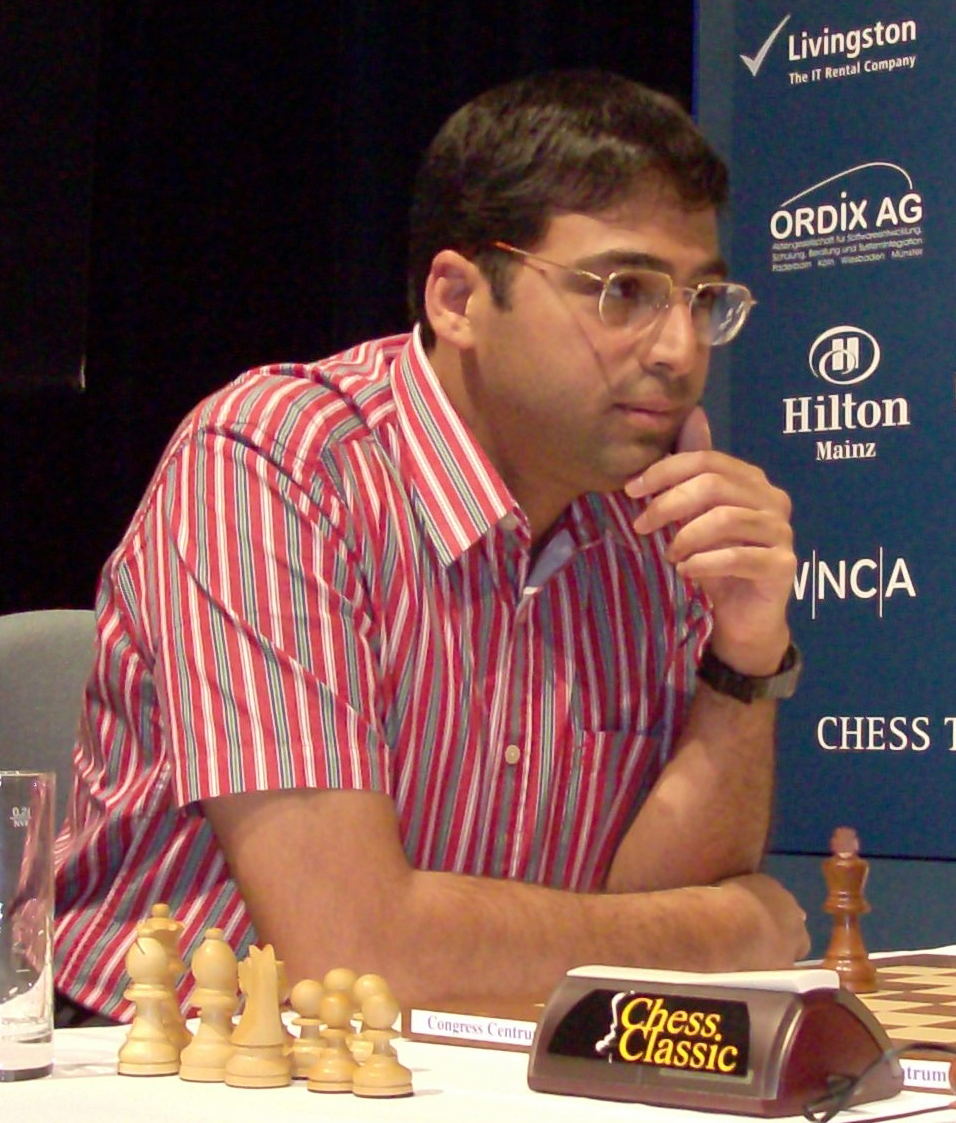
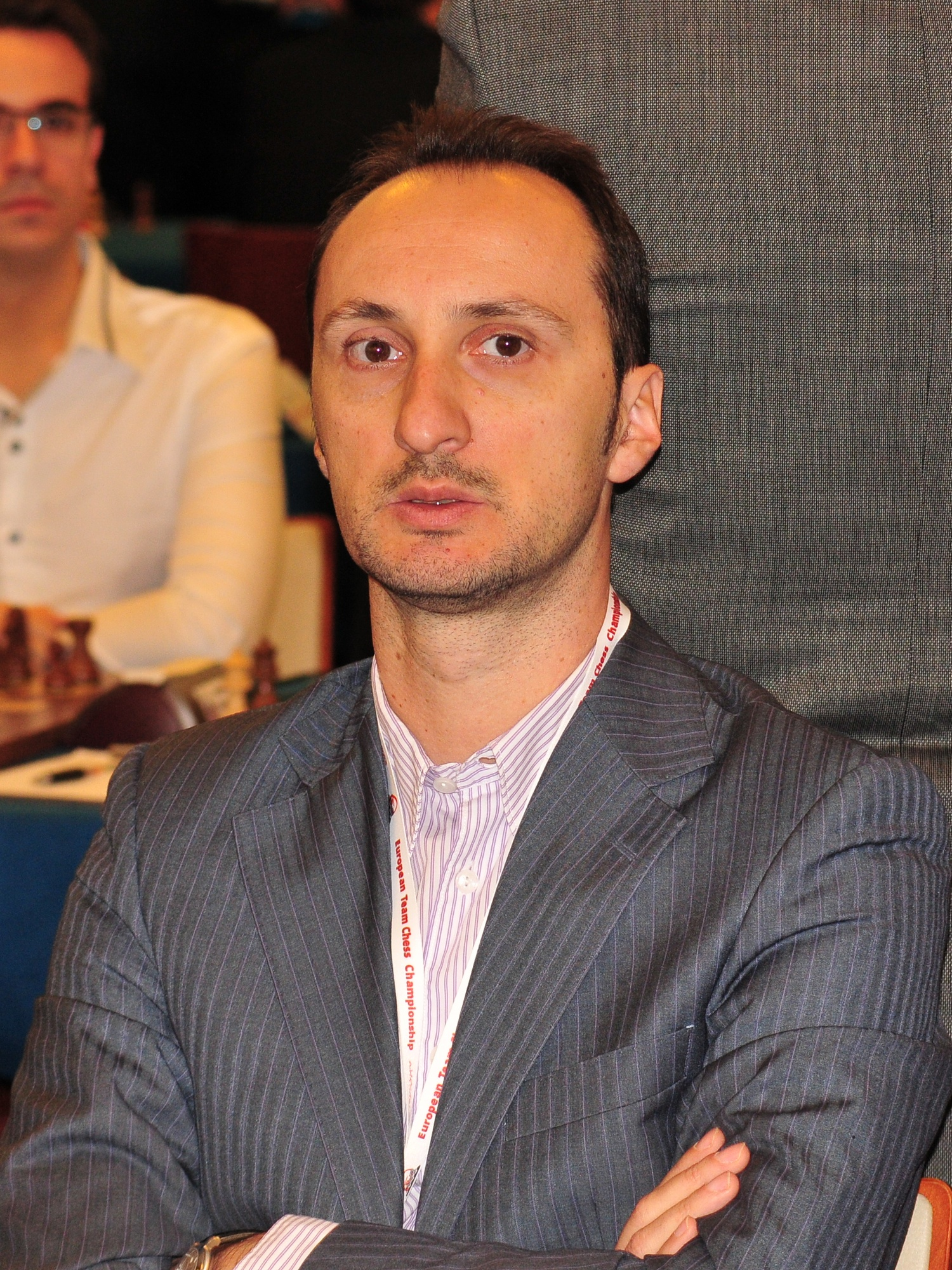
	Viswanathan Anand	
	(India) Viswanathan Anand	(Bulgaria) Veselin Topalov
6½	Scores	5½
	Born 11 December 1969; 40 years old	Born 15 March 1975; 35 years old
	Winner of the 2008 World Chess Championship	Winner of the 2009 Challenger Match
	Rating: 2787 (World No. 4)	Rating: 2805 (World No. 2)

The World Chess Championship 2010 match pitted the defending world champion, Viswanathan Anand, against challenger Veselin Topalov, for the title of World Chess Champion. The match took place in Sofia, Bulgaria from 24 April to 13 May 2010, with a prize fund of 2 million euros (60% to the winner). Anand won the final game to win the match 6½–5½ and retain the title.

The match was to be twelve games, with tie-breaks if necessary, the same format and length as the 2006 and 2008 matches.

== Background ==
=== Qualifying ===
In early 2006, FIDE announced that the World Chess Championship 2007 for the title of FIDE World Chess Champion would be an eight-player tournament. At the time there were two rival World Champions, 2005 FIDE World Champion Veselin Topalov, and "Classical" World Champion Vladimir Kramnik. The list of the eight players for the tournament included Topalov, but not Kramnik. To unify the two World Champion titles, FIDE later organised a match between Kramnik and Topalov (the World Chess Championship 2006). Kramnik was to take Topalov's place in the World Chess Championship 2007 if he won the match, which he did. Topalov was hence excluded from the 2007 World Chess Championship, a tournament eventually won by Indian GM Viswanathan Anand to become the World Champion. Anand subsequently defended his title in a one-off match against Kramnik, the World Chess Championship 2008.

The World Chess Championship format then returned to its original form, wherein a match between the current champion and a challenger would decide the World Champion. To choose the challenger, FIDE organized the Chess World Cup 2007. Topalov was compensated for missing the 2007 tournament by getting direct entry to a Challenger Match against the winner of the Chess World Cup. The winner of the Challenger Match would then be the official challenger to Anand.

Gata Kamsky earned the right to play in the Challenger Match by winning the Chess World Cup 2007.

=== Challenger Match ===
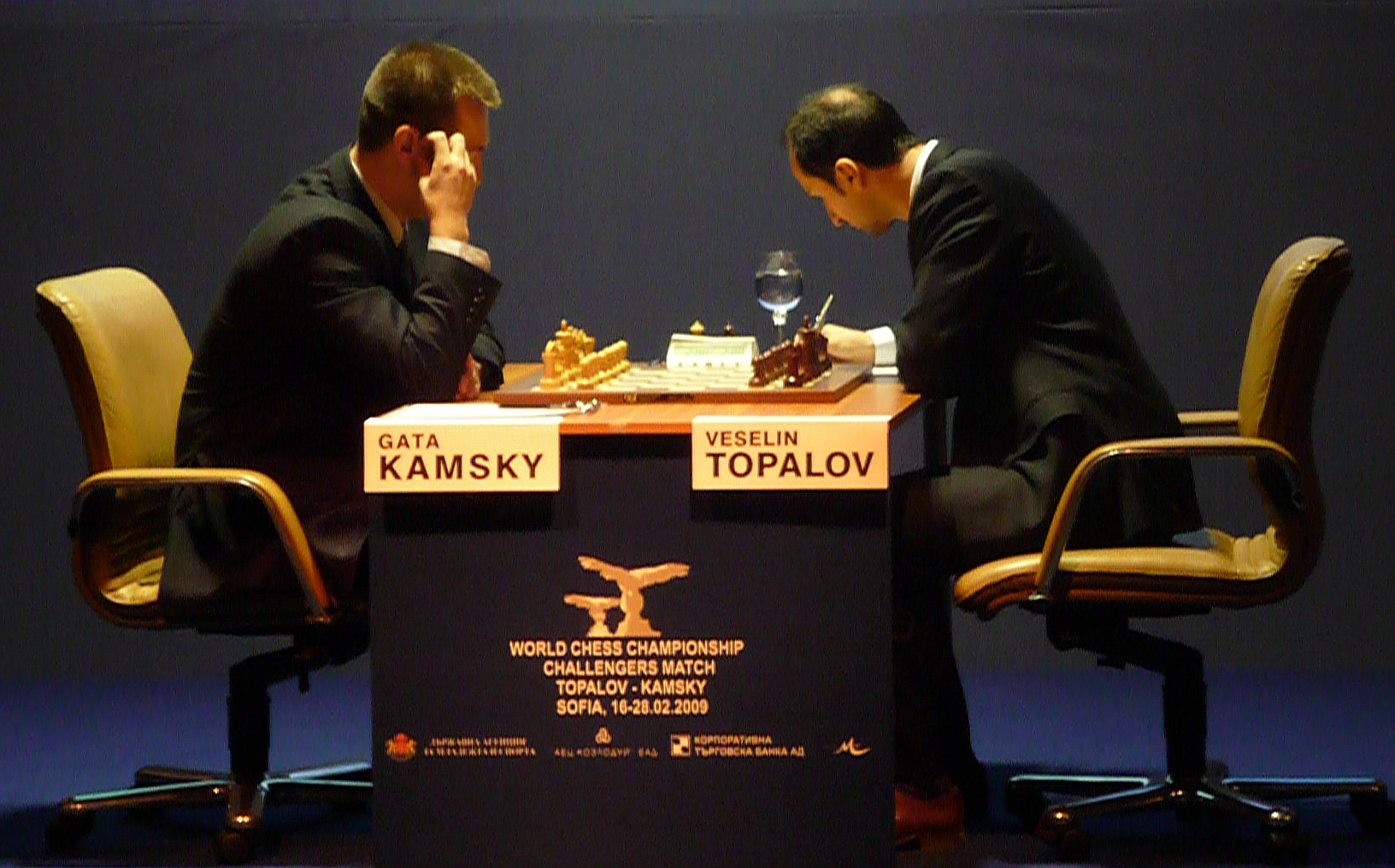
Game 2 of the Challenger Match

The Challenger Match was an eight-game match between Topalov and Kamsky. It was played in Sofia, Bulgaria, between 16 and 28 February 2009.

After Kamsky won the World Cup, there was ongoing uncertainty about the location for the Challenger match. Topalov preferred his home country of Bulgaria, while Kamsky wanted to play in a neutral country, and his manager organised a bid from Lviv, Ukraine. FIDE awarded the match to Bulgaria in February 2008, to Ukraine in June 2008, then back to Bulgaria in November 2008 because of problems with finances from Ukraine. Kamsky got a new manager, and met with FIDE and Topalov representatives during the Chess Olympiad, and on 19 November 2008, FIDE announced that the players had agreed to play in Bulgaria, despite Kamsky's preference to play elsewhere. The match was originally scheduled for November 2008, but the late change to Bulgaria forced the match to be rescheduled for 16–28 February 2009.

On 26 February 2009, Topalov defeated Kamsky in game 7 to win the match 4½–2½, earning the right to challenge Anand for the World Chess Championship. The championship match was moved from September 2009 to April 2010 after Anand requested a postponement.

Challenger Match 2009
	Rating	1	2	3	4	5	6	7	Total
Veselin Topalov (Bulgaria)	2796	½	1	½	0	1	½	1	4½
Gata Kamsky (United States)	2725	½	0	½	1	0	½	0	2½

== The match ==
=== Match conditions ===
The match format was the best of 12 games. Players scored one point for a win and half a point for a draw. The match ended once either player scored 6½ points. Time control was 120 minutes, with 60 minutes added after move 40, 15 minutes added after move 60, and 30 additional seconds per move starting from move 61.

The match regulations specify a series of tie breaks.

1. If the score is tied after 12 games, colors will be drawn and four rapid games will be played. The time control for these games will be 25 minutes plus 10 seconds per move.
2. If the score is tied after the four rapid tie break games, colors will be drawn and two blitz games (5 minutes plus 10 seconds increment per move) will be played. If the score is tied after two blitz games, another two-game blitz match will be played, under the same terms. The process will repeat, if necessary, until five blitz matches have been played.
3. If the score is tied after ten blitz games, a single sudden-death "Armageddon game" will determine the champion. The winner of a drawing of lots gets to choose the colour to play, with White given 5 minutes and Black 4 minutes. Beginning with move 61, a three-second increment will be added following each move. If the game is drawn then the player with the Black pieces is declared champion.

Topalov demanded that the match be played in silence, which would occur if the players followed the Sofia Rules, which were introduced to curb draw offers in some tournaments from 2005. Anand replied that he would not comply, prompting Silvio Danailov, Topalov's manager, to say "If Vishy doesn't agree to the rules he will be forced to, because Topalov will not offer him a draw and he will not speak to him."

=== Seconds and help ===
Anand had the same group of seconds who helped his preparation in World Chess Championship 2008: Peter Heine Nielsen, Rustam Kasimdzhanov, Surya Ganguly and Radosław Wojtaszek. In a post-match interview Anand mentioned that Magnus Carlsen and Garry Kasparov had also helped him in preparation and that Vladimir Kramnik helped during the match.

Topalov's seconds were Jan Smeets, Erwin l'Ami, Ivan Cheparinov and Jiri Dufek. For preparation, Topalov also used a state-owned IBM Blue Gene/P supercomputer with 8192 processors, running the latest version of Rybka.

=== Previous head-to-head record ===
Before the 2010 match, Anand and Topalov played 67 games against each other at classical time control with the following statistics:

	Anand wins	Draws	Topalov wins	Total
Anand (White) – Topalov (Black)	13	16	4	33
Topalov (White) – Anand (Black)	4	21	9	34
Total	17	37	13	67

=== Schedule and results ===
Game	Date	Topalov	Anand	Standing
1	24 April	1	0	Topalov leads 1–0
2	25 April	0	1	Match tied 1–1
3	27 April	½	½	Match tied 1½–1½
4	28 April	0	1	Anand leads 2½–1½
5	30 April	½	½	Anand leads 3–2
6	1 May	½	½	Anand leads 3½–2½
7	3 May	½	½	Anand leads 4–3
8	4 May	1	0	Match tied 4–4
9	6 May	½	½	Match tied 4½–4½
10	7 May	½	½	Match tied 5–5
11	9 May	½	½	Match tied 5½–5½
12	11 May	0	1	Anand wins 6½ – 5½
Tie Breaks	13 May	Not required		

The start of the match was delayed one day due to air travel disruptions caused by the volcanic ash emissions from Eyjafjallajökull. Anand was to fly from Frankfurt to Sofia on 16 April and was stranded because of the eruption. He asked for a three-day postponement, which was refused by the organisers on 19 April. Anand finally reached Sofia on 20 April, after a 40-hour road journey. The first game was consequently delayed by one day.

All games started at 3.00 pm EEST (UTC+3), except Game 1, which began at 5.00 pm EEST.

Former FIDE World Chess Champion Alexander Khalifman, who analysed the 2010 Anand–Topalov World Championship match for the Russian chess magazine 64, stated in a subsequent interview that "The chess was very good, and in sporting terms it was always a heated struggle with no short draws. While the result was fair. Despite the fact that Topalov had prepared superbly, it has to be admitted that in terms of talent he is still inferior to Anand. And even the age difference didn’t tell. Anand is a genius. He emanates light."

== Games ==
=== Game 1, Topalov–Anand, 1–0 ===
Position after 23. Rf3

Position: a8 black rook, c8 black bishop, f8 black rook, g8 black king, a7 black pawn, b6 black pawn, f6 black pawn, a5 black knight, e5 black queen, f5 white pawn, g5 black pawn, h5 white knight, d4 black pawn, e4 white pawn, d3 white bishop, f3 white rook, a2 white pawn, d2 white queen, g2 white pawn, c1 white rook, g1 white king

Game 1: Anand played 23... Kf7?, allowing Topalov to sacrifice a knight with 24. Nxf6!!, resulting in Anand's resignation seven moves later.

Grünfeld Defence, Exchange Variation, D86

1. d4 Nf6 2. c4 g6 3. Nc3 d5 4. cxd5 Nxd5 5. e4 Nxc3 6. bxc3 Bg7 7. Bc4 c5 8. Ne2 Nc6 9. Be3 0-0 10. 0-0 Na5 11. Bd3 b6 12. Qd2 e5 13. Bh6 cxd4 14. Bxg7 Kxg7 15. cxd4 exd4 16. Rac1 Qd6 17. f4 f6 18. f5 Qe5 19. Nf4 g5 20. Nh5+ Kg8 21. h4 h6 22. hxg5 hxg5 23. Rf3 Kf7? 24. Nxf6!! Kxf6 25. Rh3! Rg8 26. Rh6+ Kf7 27. Rh7+ Ke8 28. Rcc7 Kd8 29. Bb5 Qxe4 30. Rxc8+ 1–0

Anand admitted he forgot his preparation (23...Bd7 prior to Kf7) while considering his 23rd move, leading to his blunder 23...Kf7?

=== Game 2, Anand–Topalov, 1–0 ===
Position after 25. R1c4

Position: b8 black bishop, d8 black rook, e8 black rook, g8 black king, f7 black pawn, g7 black pawn, b6 black pawn, c6 white rook, e6 black pawn, f6 black knight, a5 black pawn, d5 black knight, h5 black pawn, a4 white pawn, c4 white rook, d4 black pawn, f4 white pawn, d3 white knight, g3 white pawn, a2 white pawn, d2 white bishop, e2 white pawn, g2 white bishop, h2 white pawn, g1 white king

Game 2: Topalov played 25... Ne3? in this equal position, giving Anand the advantage which he converted into a win.

Catalan Opening, Open Defense, E03

1. d4 Nf6 2. c4 e6 3. Nf3 d5 4. g3 dxc4 5. Bg2 a6 6. Ne5 c5 7. Na3 cxd4 8. Naxc4 Bc5 9. 0-0 0-0 10. Bd2 Nd5 11. Rc1 Nd7 12. Nd3 Ba7 13. Ba5 Qe7 14. Qb3 Rb8 15. Qa3!? Qxa3 16. bxa3 N7f6 17. Nce5 Re8 18. Rc2 b6 19. Bd2 Bb7 20. Rfc1 Rbd8 21. f4!? Bb8 22. a4 a5 23. Nc6 Bxc6 24. Rxc6 h5?! 25. R1c4 Ne3? 26. Bxe3 dxe3 27. Bf3 g6 28. Rxb6 Ba7 29. Rb3 Rd4 30. Rc7 Bb8 31. Rc5 Bd6 32. Rxa5 Rc8 33. Kg2 Rc2 34. a3 Ra2 35. Nb4 Bxb4 36. axb4 Nd5 37. b5 Raxa4 38. Rxa4 Rxa4 39. Bxd5 exd5 40. b6 Ra8 41. b7 Rb8 42. Kf3 d4 43. Ke4 1–0

The move 16...Nc5 removing White's blockading knight was much better for Topalov, with Black doing well after 17. Nd6 b6. Anand noted that Black started to lose his grip on the position after 25...Ne3?

=== Game 3, Topalov–Anand, ½–½ ===
Slav Defense, Wiesbaden variation, D17

1.d4 d5 2.c4 c6 3.Nf3 Nf6 4.Nc3 dxc4 5.a4 Bf5 6.Ne5 e6 7.f3 c5 8.e4 Bg6 9.Be3 cxd4 10.Qxd4 Qxd4 11.Bxd4 Nfd7! 12.Nxd7 Nxd7 13.Bxc4 a6 14.Rc1 Rg8! 15.h4 h6 16.Ke2 Bd6 17.h5 Bh7 18.a5! Ke7 19.Na4 f6 20.b4! Rgc8 21.Bc5 Bxc5 22.bxc5 Rc7 23.Nb6 Rd8 24.Nxd7 Rdxd7 25.Bd3 Bg8 26.c6 Rd6 27.cxb7 Rxb7 28.Rc3 Bf7 29.Ke3 Be8 30.g4 e5 31.Rhc1 Bd7 32.Rc5 Bb5! 33.Bxb5 axb5 34.Rb1 b4 35.Rb3 Ra6 36.Kd3 Rba7 37.Rxb4 Rxa5 38.Rxa5 Rxa5 39.Rb7+ Kf8 40.Ke2 Ra2+ 41.Ke3 Ra3+ 42.Kf2 Ra2+ 43.Ke3 Ra3+ 44.Kf2 Ra2+ 45.Ke3 Ra3+ 46.Kf2 ½–½
A draw by threefold repetition.

14...Rg8! Black plans Bd6, Ke7, f6, Rgc8, Bg8, etc. White actually has to hurry up and do something against it, which is not easy, since his knight on c3 is misplaced.

20. b4! Topalov activates quickly before Black manages to get all his pieces into play.

32...Bb5! Anand manages to neutralize his only weakness, the pawn on a6.

There was no handshake at the end of the third game. At the press conference both players admitted that they simply forgot to shake hands.

=== Game 4, Anand–Topalov, 1–0 ===
Position after 25...Bxg2

Position: d8 black rook, f8 black rook, g8 black king, a7 black queen, a6 black knight, d6 white knight, e6 black pawn, f6 black pawn, h6 white queen, a5 black pawn, e5 white pawn, a4 black pawn, b4 black knight, g3 white pawn, b2 white pawn, f2 white pawn, g2 black bishop, h2 white pawn, c1 white rook, d1 white rook, g1 white king

Game 4: Having already sacrificed two pieces, Anand played 26. exf6!, continuing a mating attack that started with 23. Nxh6+!.

Catalan Opening, Open, 5. Nf3, E04

1.d4 Nf6 2.c4 e6 3.Nf3 d5 4.g3 dxc4 5.Bg2 Bb4+ 6.Bd2 a5 7.Qc2 Bxd2+ 8.Qxd2!? c6 9.a4 b5 10.Na3! Bd7 11.Ne5 Nd5 12.e4! Nb4 13.0-0 0-0 14.Rfd1 Be8 15.d5! Qd6 16.Ng4 Qc5 17.Ne3 N8a6?! 18.dxc6 bxa4 19.Naxc4 Bxc6 20.Rac1 h6?! 21.Nd6 Qa7? 22.Ng4! Rad8 23.Nxh6+!! gxh6 24.Qxh6 f6 25.e5! Bxg2 26.exf6! Rxd6 27.Rxd6 Be4 28.Rxe6 Nd3 29.Rc2! Qh7 30.f7+! Qxf7 31.Rxe4 Qf5 32.Re7 1–0

10. Na3! is a strong novelty, developing without winning back the pawn. In order to protect the pawn, Black is forced to place his pieces in awkward positions. The day before the fourth game, the 10.Na3! novelty was independently found by Levon Aronian, who was at that time carrying out a training camp in Armenia. Anand won "Yearbook Novelty Award of 2010" for this move.

With 15. d5! Anand is finally ready and starts his breakthrough attack.

21...Qa7? A decisive mistake. Now the queen is saved, but the king is not. 21...Qg5! was already the only way to stay in the game. Anand quickly found the proper reply with 22. Ng4! starting the final attack on Black's king.

=== Game 5, Topalov–Anand, ½–½ ===
Slav Defense, D17

1.d4 d5 2.c4 c6 3.Nf3 Nf6 4.Nc3 dxc4 5.a4 Bf5 6.Ne5 e6 7.f3 c5 8.e4 Bg6 9.Be3 cxd4 10.Qxd4 Qxd4 11.Bxd4 Nfd7 12.Nxd7 Nxd7 13.Bxc4 a6 14.Rc1 Rg8 15.h4 h5 16.Ne2 Bd6 17.Be3 Ne5 18.Nf4 Rc8 19.Bb3 Rxc1+ 20.Bxc1 Ke7 21.Ke2 Rc8 22.Bd2 f6 23.Nxg6+ Nxg6 24.g3 Ne5 25.f4 Nc6 26.Bc3 Bb4 27.Bxb4+ Nxb4 28.Rd1 Nc6 29.Rd2 g5 30.Kf2 g4 31.Rc2 Rd8 32.Ke3 Rd6 33.Rc5 Nb4 34.Rc7+ Kd8 35.Rc3 Ke7 36.e5 Rd7 37.exf6+ Kxf6 38.Ke2 Nc6 39.Ke1 Nd4 40.Bd1 a5 41.Rc5 Nf5 42.Rc3 Nd4 43.Rc5 Nf5 44.Rc3 ½–½
A draw by threefold repetition.

Anand repeated the Slav line with which he defended in game three. He deviated with 15...h5 to avoid having his light-squared bishop boxed in. The event suffered a power outage for thirteen minutes while Anand contemplated his 17th move; the organizers later apologized for this mishap, which was caused by an electrical system failure in central Sofia.

=== Game 6, Anand–Topalov, ½–½ ===
Catalan Opening, Open Defense, E03

1.d4 Nf6 2.c4 e6 3.Nf3 d5 4.g3 dxc4 5.Bg2 a6 6.Ne5 c5 7.Na3 cxd4 8.Naxc4 Bc5 9.0-0 0-0 10.Bg5 h6 11.Bxf6 Qxf6 12.Nd3 Ba7 13.Qa4 Nc6 14.Rac1 e5 15.Bxc6 b5 16.Qc2 Qxc6 17.Ncxe5 Qe4 18.Qc6 Bb7 19.Qxe4 Bxe4 20.Rc2 Rfe8 21.Rfc1 f6 22.Nd7 Bf5 23.N7c5 Bb6 24.Nb7 Bd7 25.Nf4 Rab8 26.Nd6 Re5 27.Nc8 Ba5 28.Nd3 Re8 29.Na7 Bb6 30.Nc6 Rb7 31.Ncb4 a5 32.Nd5 a4 33.Nxb6 Rxb6 34.Nc5 Bf5 35.Rd2 Rc6 36.b4 axb3 37.axb3 b4 38.Rxd4 Rxe2 39.Rxb4 Bh3! 40.Rbc4 Rd6 41.Re4 Rb2 42.Ree1 Rdd2 43.Ne4 Rd4 44.Nc5 Rdd2 45.Ne4 Rd3 46.Rb1 Rdxb3 47.Nd2 Rb4 48.f3 g5 49.Rxb2 Rxb2 50.Rd1 Kf7 51.Kf2 h5 52.Ke3 Rc2 53.Ra1 Kg6 54.Ra6 Bf5 55.Rd6 Rc3+ 56.Kf2 Rc2 57.Ke3 Rc3+ 58.Kf2 Rc2 ½–½
A draw by threefold repetition.

22. Nd7 Anand begins the longest string of knight moves ever seen in a World Championship match.

With 39...Bh3! Topalov successfully neutralizes all of Anand's winning chances.

=== Game 7, Anand–Topalov, ½–½ ===
Position after 15...Bh3

Position: a8 black queen, f8 black rook, g8 black king, a7 black pawn, e7 black bishop, f7 black pawn, g7 black pawn, h7 black pawn, b5 black pawn, d5 black knight, e5 black pawn, c4 black pawn, d4 white pawn, e4 white pawn, f3 white pawn, g3 white pawn, h3 black bishop, a2 white pawn, b2 white pawn, d2 white bishop, h2 white pawn, a1 white rook, b1 white knight, d1 white queen, f1 white rook, g1 white king

Game 7: Topalov allowed Anand to play 16. exd5, getting enormous pressure on the queenside in exchange for the sacrificed knight.

Bogo-Indian Defence, E11

1.d4 Nf6 2.c4 e6 3.Nf3 d5 4.g3 Bb4+ 5.Bd2 Be7 6.Bg2 0-0 7.0-0 c6 8.Bf4 dxc4 9.Ne5 b5 10.Nxc6 Nxc6 11.Bxc6 Bd7 12.Bxa8 Qxa8 13.f3 Nd5 14.Bd2 e5 15.e4 Bh3 16.exd5 Bxf1 17.Qxf1 exd4 18.a4 Qxd5 19.axb5 Qxb5 20.Rxa7 Re8 21.Kh1 Bf8 22.Rc7 d3 23.Bc3 Bd6 24.Ra7 h6 25.Nd2 Bb4! 26.Ra1! Bxc3 27.bxc3 Re2 28.Rd1 Qa4 29.Ne4 Qc2 30.Rc1 Rxh2+ 31.Kg1 Rg2+ 32.Qxg2 Qxc1+ 33.Qf1 Qe3+ 34.Qf2 Qc1+ 35.Qf1 Qe3+ 36.Kg2 f5 37.Nf2 Kh7 38.Qb1 Qe6 39.Qb5 g5 40.g4 fxg4 41.fxg4 Kg6 42.Qb7 d2 43.Qb1+ Kg7 44.Kf1 Qe7 45.Kg2 Qe6 46.Qd1 Qe3 47.Qf3 Qe6 48.Qb7+ Kg6 49.Qb1+ Kg7 50.Qd1 Qe3 51.Qc2 Qe2 52.Qa4 Kg8 53.Qd7 Kf8 54.Qd5 Kg7 55.Kg3 Qe3+ 56.Qf3 Qe5+ 57.Kg2 Qe6 58.Qd1 ½–½
A draw by threefold repetition.

11...Bd7 is a novelty, as in Gelfand-Ivanchuk, Amber (blindfold) 2010, Ivanchuk had played 11...Ba6.

At move 21. Kh1 Anand finally managed to push Topalov out of his prepared line, having spent over an hour on his clock compared to Topalov having spent only 3 minutes.

25...Bb4! 26.Ra1! Topalov played a poisoned move and Anand finds the only response. Other moves such as 26.Ne4 would fail to 26...Bxc3 27.bxc3 f5 28.Nd6 Qc5 29.Rxg7+ Kxg7 30.Nxe8+ Kf7

=== Game 8, Topalov–Anand, 1–0 ===
Position after 54. Kg5

Position: b7 black pawn, f7 black king, h7 black pawn, a6 black pawn, d6 white pawn, e6 black pawn, a5 white pawn, b5 black bishop, e5 white bishop, g5 white king, f3 white pawn, b2 white pawn, g2 white pawn

Game 8: Anand should have protected his h7 pawn with his bishop. His actual 54... Bc6?? was a blunder that lost him the game.

Slav Defense: Czech. Wiesbaden Variation, D17

1.d4 d5 2.c4 c6 3.Nf3 Nf6 4.Nc3 dxc4 5.a4 Bf5 6.Ne5 e6 7.f3 c5 8.e4 Bg6 9.Be3 cxd4 10.Qxd4 Qxd4 11.Bxd4 Nfd7 12.Nxd7 Nxd7 13.Bxc4 Rc8 14.Bb5 a6 15.Bxd7+ Kxd7 16.Ke2 f6 17.Rhd1 Ke8 18.a5 Be7 19.Bb6 Rf8 20.Rac1 f5 21.e5 Bg5 22.Be3 f4 23.Ne4 Rxc1 24.Nd6+ Kd7 25.Bxc1 Kc6 26.Bd2 Be7 27.Rc1+ Kd7 28.Bc3 Bxd6 29.Rd1 Bf5 30.h4 g6 31.Rxd6+ Kc8 32.Bd2 Rd8 33.Bxf4 Rxd6 34.exd6 Kd7 35.Ke3 Bc2 36.Kd4 Ke8 37.Ke5 Kf7 38.Be3 Ba4 39.Kf4 Bb5 40.Bc5 Kf6 41.Bd4+ Kf7 42.Kg5 Bc6 43.Kh6 Kg8 44.h5 Be8 45.Kg5 Kf7 46.Kh6 Kg8 47.Bc5 gxh5 48.Kg5 Kg7 49.Bd4+ Kf7 50.Be5 h4 51.Kxh4 Kg6 52.Kg4 Bb5 53.Kf4 Kf7 54.Kg5 Bc6?? 55.Kh6 Kg8 56.g4 1–0

Black's 54...Bc6?? was a blunder that removed the possibility of Black protecting the h7 pawn with his bishop. The move 54...Bd3 would have been an easy draw.

Though the game appeared to finish early, it might have concluded: 56.g4 Bd7 57.g5 Be8 58.Bg7 Bd7 59.g6 hxg6 60.Kxg6 and Black is helpless to prevent White from penetrating, for example: 60...Be8+ 61.Kf6 Bd7 62.Ke7 Bc6 63.d7 Bxd7 64.Kxd7 Kxg7 65.Kxe6 1–0.

=== Game 9, Anand–Topalov, ½–½ ===
Position after 63...Kc8

Position: c8 black king, g7 white rook, d5 white rook, a4 black pawn, b3 black pawn, f3 white pawn, a2 black queen, d2 white knight, h2 white king

Game 9: Topalov's king is in trouble, but Anand, who had already missed an earlier win over 20 moves ago, let him off the hook with 64. Kg3?, allowing Topalov a perpetual.

Nimzo-Indian, 4.e3, Gligoric System, E54

1. d4 Nf6 2. c4 e6 3. Nc3 Bb4 4. e3 0-0 5. Bd3 c5 6. Nf3 d5 7. 0-0 cxd4 8. exd4 dxc4 9. Bxc4 b6 10. Bg5 Bb7 11. Re1 Nbd7 12. Rc1 Rc8 13. Bd3 Re8 14. Qe2 Bxc3 15. bxc3 Qc7 16. Bh4 Nh5 17. Ng5 g6 18. Nh3 e5 19. f3 Qd6 20. Bf2 exd4 21. Qxe8+ Rxe8 22. Rxe8+ Nf8 23. cxd4 Nf6 24. Ree1 Ne6 25. Bc4 Bd5 26. Bg3 Qb4 27. Be5 Nd7 28. a3 Qa4 29. Bxd5 Nxe5 30. Bxe6 Qxd4+ 31. Kh1 fxe6 32. Ng5 Qd6 33. Ne4 Qxa3 34. Rc3 Qb2 35. h4 b5 36. Rc8+ Kg7 37. Rc7+ Kf8 38. Ng5 Ke8 39. Rxh7 Qc3 40. Rh8+? Kd7 41. Rh7+ Kc6 42. Re4 b4 43. Nxe6 Kb6 44. Nf4 Qa1+ 45. Kh2 a5 46. h5 gxh5 47. Rxh5 Nc6 48. Nd5+ Kb7 49. Rh7+ Ka6 50. Re6 Kb5 51. Rh5 Nd4 52. Nb6+ Ka6 53. Rd6 Kb7 54. Nc4 Nxf3+ 55. gxf3 Qa2+ 56. Nd2 Kc7 57. Rhd5 b3 58. Rd7+ Kc8 59. Rd8+ Kc7 60. R8d7+ Kc8 61. Rg7 a4 62. Rc5+? Kb8 63. Rd5 Kc8 64. Kg3? Qa1 65. Rg4 b2 66. Rc4+ Kb7 67. Kf2 b1=Q 68. Nxb1 Qxb1 69. Rdd4 Qa2+ 70. Kg3 a3 71. Rc3 Qa1 72. Rb4+ Ka6 73. Ra4+ Kb5 74. Rcxa3 Qg1+ 75. Kf4 Qc1+ 76. Kf5 Qc5+ 77. Ke4 Qc2+ 78. Ke3 Qc1+ 79. Kf2 Qd2+ 80. Kg3 Qe1+ 81. Kf4 Qc1+ 82. Kg3 Qg1+ 83. Kf4 ½–½
A draw by threefold repetition (with perpetual check).

Anand moved 40. Rh8+?, hoping to repeat moves in order to make time control. However, this a mistake that lets the Black king escape. It was better to play 40. Re4 b4 41. Rxa7 b3 42. Rb7 b2 43. Kh2 Qc1 44. Ra4 Nd7 45. Rab4.

Anand missed a chance to win when he played 64. Kg3?. A winning move was 64. Rdd7 a3 65. Kg3 Qa1 (65...b2 66. Rc7+ Kd8 67. Ra7 Qd5 68. Ra8+ Qxa8 69. Rg8+ Kd7 70. Rxa8) 66. Rc7+ Kb8 67. Rb7+ Ka8 68. Nxb3.

=== Game 10, Topalov–Anand, ½–½ ===
Position after 25. Ba6!

Position: g8 black king, a7 black pawn, b7 black bishop, g7 black bishop, h7 black pawn, a6 white bishop, b6 black pawn, c6 black knight, g6 black pawn, d5 white knight, e5 black queen, e4 white pawn, e3 white bishop, h3 white pawn, a2 white pawn, g2 white pawn, c1 white queen, g1 white king

Game 10: Anand played 25... Nd4?! to avoid unnecessary complications, but this move was a mistake which handed Topalov the initiative. Anand later equalized and the game was drawn.

Grünfeld Defence: Exchange. Classical Variation, D86

1.d4 Nf6 2.c4 g6 3.Nc3 d5 4.cxd5 Nxd5 5.e4 Nxc3 6.bxc3 Bg7 7.Bc4 c5 8.Ne2 Nc6 9.Be3 0-0 10.0-0 b6 11.Qd2 Bb7 12.Rac1 Rc8 13.Rfd1 cxd4 14.cxd4 Qd6 15.d5 Na5 16.Bb5 Rxc1 17.Rxc1 Rc8 18.h3 Rxc1+ 19.Qxc1 e6 20.Nf4 exd5 21.Nxd5 f5 22.f3 fxe4 23.fxe4 Qe5 24.Bd3 Nc6 25.Ba6! Nd4?! 26.Qc4 Bxd5 27.Qxd5+ Qxd5 28.exd5 Be5 29.Kf2 Kf7 30.Bg5 Nf5 31.g4 Nd6 32.Kf3 Ne8 33.Bc1 Nc7 34.Bd3 Bd6 35.Ke4 b5 36.Kd4 a6 37.Be2 Ke7 38.Bg5+ Kd7 39.Bd2 Bg3 40.g5 Bf2+ 41.Ke5 Bg3+ 42.Ke4 Ne8 43.Bg4+ Ke7 44.Be6 Nd6+ 45.Kf3 Nc4! 46.Bc1 Bd6 47.Ke4 a5 48.Bg4 Ba3 49.Bxa3+ Nxa3 50.Ke5 Nc4+ 51.Kd4 Kd6 52.Be2 Na3 53.h4 Nc2+ 54.Kc3 Nb4 55.Bxb5 Nxa2+ 56.Kb3 Nb4 57.Be2 Nxd5 58.h5 Nf4 59.hxg6 hxg6 60.Bc4 ½–½
A draw by mutual agreement.

To avoid unnecessary complications, Anand played 25...Nd4?! but the best chance was in 25...Bxa6 likely followed by 26.Qxc6 Qa1+ 27.Kf2 Qxa2+ 28.Kg3 Qa3! 29.Qa8+ Qf8 30.Qxa7 Be5+ 31.Kh4 Qf1 32.g3 Bc8 33.g4 Bf6+ 34.Nxf6+ Qxf6+=.

Anand subsequently equalised the game with 45...Nc4! It was likely that Topalov missed this move.

=== Game 11, Anand–Topalov, ½–½ ===
Position after 60...b3

Position: a7 black pawn, d7 black rook, g7 black king, f6 black pawn, g6 white pawn, c5 black knight, f5 white pawn, h5 white king, f4 white knight, b3 black pawn, e3 white rook

Game 11: In his last White game, Anand played 61.Rc3 setting a trap (if Topalov now played 61...b2?? trying to force his b-pawn to promotion, Anand can threaten a mate with 62.Rxc5!); but Topalov did not fall into it, and the game was drawn five moves later.

English Opening: King's English Variation, Four Knights Variation Fianchetto Lines A29

1. c4 e5 2. Nc3 Nf6 3. Nf3 Nc6 4. g3 d5 5. cxd5 Nxd5 6. Bg2 Nb6 7. 0-0 Be7 8. a3 0–0 9. b4 Be6 10. d3 f6 11. Ne4 Qe8 12. Nc5 Bxc5 13. bxc5 Nd5 14. Bb2 Rd8 15. Qc2 Nde7! 16. Rab1 Ba2! 17. Rbc1 Qf7 18. Bc3 Rd7 19. Qb2 Rb8 20. Rfd1 Be6 21. Rd2 h6?! 22. Qb1 Nd5 23. Rb2! b6 24. cxb6 cxb6 25. Bd2 Rd6 26. Rbc2 Qd7 27. h4 Rd8 28. Qb5 Nde7 29. Qb2 Bd5 30. Bb4 Nxb4 31. axb4 Rc6 32. b5 Rxc2 33. Rxc2 Be6 34. d4 e4 35. Nd2 Qxd4 36. Nxe4 Qxb2 37. Rxb2 Kf7 38. e3 g5 39. hxg5 hxg5 40. f4 gxf4 41. exf4 Rd4 42. Kf2 Nf5 43. Bf3 Bd5 44. Nd2 Bxf3 45. Nxf3 Ra4 46. g4 Nd6 47. Kg3 Ne4+ 48. Kh4! Nd6 49. Rd2?! Nxb5 50. f5 Re4 51. Kh5! Re3 52. Nh4 Nc3 53. Rd7+ Re7 54. Rd3 Ne4 55. Ng6 Nc5 56. Ra3 Rd7 57. Re3 Kg7 58. g5 b5 59. Nf4 b4 60. g6 b3 61. Rc3 Rd4 62. Rxc5 Rxf4 63. Rc7+ Kg8 64. Rb7 Rf3 65. Rb8+ Kg7 ½–½
A draw by perpetual check.

With 15...Nde7! Black regroups. The d5 square is now open for the bishop and White's bishop pair is not important yet. 46. g4?! Nd6?! White weakens his kingside in an attempt to gain activity and Topalov misses the best reply in 46...Ne7! winning a pawn.

In the final moves of the game 60...b3! 61.Rc3 Rd4! Anand makes a last attempt to win, setting a trap if Topalov attempts to push his b-pawn to promotion (61...b2?? 62.Rxc5! b1=Q?? 63.Ne6+ Kg8 [or Kh8] 64.Rc8+ Rd8 65.Rxd8#) but Topalov did not blunder into it.

The position after move 11 had only been played once before.

Prior to the game, Topalov asked for one minute of silence in memory of Andor Lilienthal, who had died the day before.

=== Game 12, Topalov–Anand, 0–1 ===
Position after 56...Qg7

Position: f7 white knight, g7 black queen, h7 black king, d6 white rook, a5 black pawn, h5 black pawn, a4 white pawn, c4 black pawn, g3 white pawn, h3 white king

Game 12: In this position, Topalov resigned, allowing Anand to win the match and retain the championship.

Queen's Gambit Declined: Lasker Defense, D56

1.d4 d5 2.c4 e6 3.Nf3 Nf6 4.Nc3 Be7 5.Bg5 h6 6.Bh4 0-0 7.e3 Ne4 8.Bxe7 Qxe7 9.Rc1 c6 10.Be2 Nxc3 11.Rxc3 dxc4 12.Bxc4 Nd7 13.0-0 b6 14.Bd3 c5 15.Be4 Rb8 16.Qc2 Nf6!? 17.dxc5 Nxe4 18.Qxe4 bxc5 19.Qc2 Bb7 20.Nd2 Rfd8 21.f3 Ba6 22.Rf2 Rd7 23.g3 Rbd8 24.Kg2 Bd3 25.Qc1 Ba6 26.Ra3 Bb7 27.Nb3 Rc7 28.Na5 Ba8 29.Nc4 e5 30.e4 f5! 31.exf5? e4! 32.fxe4?? Qxe4+ 33.Kh3 Rd4 34.Ne3 Qe8!! 35.g4 h5 36.Kh4 g5+ 37.fxg6 Qxg6 38.Qf1 Rxg4+ 39.Kh3 Re7 40.Rf8+ Kg7 41.Nf5+ Kh7 42.Rg3 Rxg3+ 43.hxg3 Qg4+ 44.Kh2 Re2+ 45.Kg1 Rg2+ 46.Qxg2 Bxg2 47.Kxg2 Qe2+ 48.Kh3 c4 49.a4 a5 50.Rf6 Kg8 51.Nh6+ Kg7 52.Rb6 Qe4 53.Kh2 Kh7 54.Rd6 Qe5 55.Nf7 Qxb2+ 56.Kh3 Qg7 0–1

This was the only win for Black in the match. Anand's choice of Lasker's Defense in the Queen's Gambit Declined appeared to signal his willingness to accept a draw, which would have tied the match at 6–6 and forced a rapid chess playoff. Most people believed that such a playoff would have greatly favoured Anand, due to his superior rapid chess resume, and Topalov in the postgame press conference noted his desire to avoid a rapid playoff, given his loss in the World Chess Championship 2006 playoff to Vladimir Kramnik.

Consequently, Topalov chose to play for complications, but Anand's 16...Nf6!? allowed Anand active piece play in return for his weak pawn on c5.

After Topalov responded to 30...f5! with 31.exf5? e4! 32.fxe4??, Anand decisively seized the initiative. Topalov admitted he had overlooked Anand's strong reply 34...Qe8!

Thus, Anand retained his World Champion title once again.

== Match stats ==
World Chess Championship Match 2010
	Rating	1	2	3	4	5	6	7	8	9	10	11	12	Total
Viswanathan Anand (India)	2787	0	1	½	1	½	½	½	0	½	½	½	1	6½
Veselin Topalov (Bulgaria)	2805	1	0	½	0	½	½	½	1	½	½	½	0	5½
