= Ivan Cheparinov =

Bulgarian chess grandmaster (born 1986)

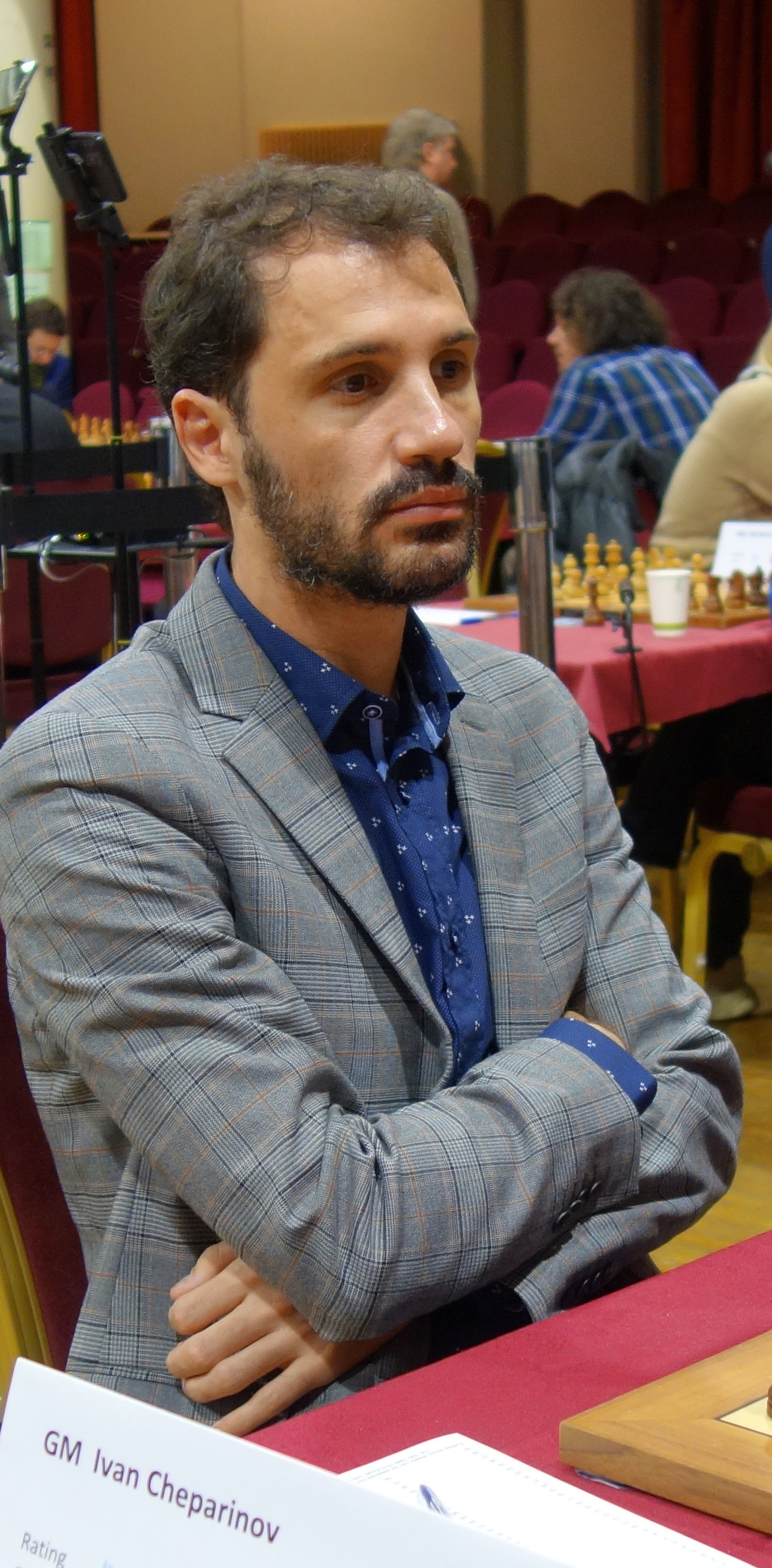
- Cheparinov in 2023

Personal information
- Born: November 26, 1986 (age 39) Asenovgrad, Bulgaria

Chess career
- Country: Bulgaria (until 2017; since 2020); FIDE (2017–2018); Georgia (2018–2020)
- Title: Grandmaster (2004)
- FIDE rating: 2631 (July 2026)
- Peak rating: 2718 (August 2018)
- Ranking: No. 96 (July 2026)
- Peak ranking: No. 19 (January 2008)

Ivan Cheparinov (Bulgarian: Иван Чепаринов; born November 26, 1986) is a Bulgarian chess grandmaster. He is a four-time Bulgarian champion (2004, 2005, 2012, 2018). Cheparinov competed in the FIDE World Cup in 2005, 2007, 2009, 2015 and 2017. He switched his affiliation from Bulgaria to FIDE in 2017, then to Georgia in 2018, and back to Bulgaria in 2020.

== Early years ==
He learned to play chess at age five and progressed quickly, winning the junior championship of Bulgaria in 2000.

== Topalov's second ==
Until 2007, he was best known as the second of former FIDE World Champion Veselin Topalov.

== Tournament successes ==
In October 2006, Cheparinov shared first place at the Essent Open in Hoogeveen with 7/9, and also shared first place at the Morelia Open in 2007.

At the traditional Sigeman & Co invitation tournament in Malmö, Ivan Cheparinov won outright in April 2007. He shared first place—with six others—at the 2007 European Individual Chess Championship in Dresden, but Vladislav Tkachiev won the tie-break. On the January 2008 FIDE rating list, Cheparinov was for the first time rated higher than 2700—often seen as the line that separates "elite" players from other grandmasters.

In June 2009 and in June 2010, he won the Ruy Lopez Masters, an invitation tournament, its fourth and last edition in 2010 with a performance rating of 2904. In June 2011, he tied for 1st–2nd with Atanas Kolev in the 3rd International Albena Open chess tournament. In October 2011, he tied for 3rd–15th in the open section of the 15th Corsican Circuit.

In 2012, he tied for 1st–3rd with Ivan Sokolov and Jonny Hector in the Politiken Cup in Copenhagen, Denmark, winning the event on tie-break.

Cheparinov came first in the strong Gibraltar Chess Festival 2014, after winning the tie-break play-off.

== Training career ==
Cheparinov has been a part of the Killer Chess Training team since November 2020. What I learned with Topalov was his first course, and he continued with Pawn Sacrifice in the Middlegame.

== Handshake controversy ==
During the 2008 Corus chess tournament, Cheparinov's game in the eighth round of Group B against Nigel Short was declared a forfeit after the first move because he had twice refused to shake Short's hand at the start. After Cheparinov refused to shake hands, Short informed the arbiter that in such cases, the rules prescribe an immediate forfeit (Short claims that the arbiter was not aware of this rule and had to be reminded of it). Cheparinov's team claimed the arbiter was not aware of the rule since there is no such rule. The Topalov–Kramnik game at the same tournament started without a handshake, although in that case neither player 'refused' a handshake since neither had offered one. FIDE's behavioural norms state that "[a]ny player who does not shake hands with the opponent ... before the game starts in a FIDE tournament or during a FIDE match (and does not do it after being asked to do so by the arbiter) ... will immediately and finally lose the relevant game."

The reason for Cheparinov's refusal was, according to the appeal made by him and his manager Silvio Danailov, that "some time ago in one of his interviews Mr. Short insulted him and our team gravely". They also claimed the arbiter had not given Cheparinov another opportunity to shake hands, but had immediately declared the game a loss. After their protest, the Appeals Committee of the tournament—consisting of Vladimir Kramnik, Michał Krasenkow and Judit Polgár—overturned the decision to forfeit the game. The committee also decided that Cheparinov should apologize to Short, that the game was to be replayed the next day and that it should start with a handshake. Short was initially livid, but was eventually persuaded by friends and family to play. Short won the replay in fine style. The handshake incident was recorded on video and posted by chess website Chessdom on YouTube, where it was viewed over 300,000 times.
