= Vasyl Ivanchuk =

Ukrainian chess grandmaster (born 1969)

- Ivanchuk in 2023

Personal information
- Born: Vasyl Mykhailovych Ivanchuk; March 18, 1969 (age 57) Kopychyntsi, Ukrainian SSR, Soviet Union
- Spouses: Alisa Galliamova (m. 1991; div. 1996) Oksana Ivanchuk (m. 2006)

Chess career
- Country: Soviet Union → Ukraine
- Title: Grandmaster (1988)
- FIDE rating: 2635 (November 2026)
- Peak rating: 2787 (October 2007)
- Ranking: No. 87 (November 2026)
- Peak ranking: No. 2 (July 1991)

Vasyl Mykhailovych Ivanchuk (Note: Many sources give Ivanchuk's first name as Vassily, which is a transliteration of the Russian equivalent of his name (Василий).) (Ukrainian: Василь Михайлович Іванчук; born March 18, 1969) is a Ukrainian chess grandmaster. He was awarded the title of Grandmaster by FIDE in 1988. A leading chess player since 1988, Ivanchuk has been ranked at No. 2 on the FIDE world rankings three times (July 1991, July 1992, October 2007).

Ivanchuk has won Linares, Wijk aan Zee, Tal Memorial, Gibraltar Masters and M-Tel Masters titles. He has also won the World Blitz Championship in 2007 and the World Rapid Championship in 2016.

== Career ==
=== Early years ===
Ivanchuk was born in Kopychyntsi on March 18, 1969. His father was a lawyer, and his mother was a physics teacher. He began playing chess after his father bought him a magnetic chess set for his birthday. The first chess book he read was Journey to the Chess Kingdom by Yuri Averbakh and Mikhail Beilin.

In 1985, he won the USSR Junior Chess Championship, and won bronze in the Ukrainian Chess Championship. The following year, he joined the chess faculty of the Lviv State University of Physical Culture.

He won the 1986/1987 European Junior Chess Championship in Groningen and first achieved international notice by winning the 1988 New York Open scoring 7½/9 points, ahead of a field of grandmasters. He tied for first place in the 1988 World Junior Chess Championship at Adelaide, but lost the title on tiebreak to Joël Lautier. He was awarded the Grandmaster title in 1988, and entered the world top 10 the same year.

=== Reaches world elite ===
Ivanchuk won the Linares tournament in 1989, 1991, and 1995. In 1991, of the fourteen players participating, eight of them, including World Chess Champion Garry Kasparov, rated in the top ten in the world, and another two among the world's top 50 players. Ivanchuk beat Kasparov by a half point, defeating Kasparov in their head-to-head game.

It was widely believed that Ivanchuk might become world champion. He came close in 2002, when he reached the final of the FIDE World Chess Championship 2002. Ivanchuk consistently ranked among the top 10 from July 1988 to October 2002 and among the top 20 up to June 2009, but Mark Crowther's The Week in Chess said his erratic play was due to "poor temperament." His results saw him drop as low as 30th in July 2009, but he returned to the top ten in the next list. His inability to become world champion despite his immense talent and longevity has been attributed to his admittedly poor nerves, demonstrated by blunders such as at the 1994 London Grand Prix blitz, when he failed to complete a strong attack on Viswanathan Anand with a mate in one despite having 0:54 left on the clock. Ivanchuk's nerves were notably exposed during the high-tension atmosphere of World Championship match-format tournaments, such as in 2002 where he was heavily favored in the FIDE championship final after having defeated defending champion Anand in the semifinals, only to lose to countryman Ruslan Ponomariov in a major upset, denying him the championship. Subsequent match-play tournaments in World Championship cycles saw Ivanchuk consistently underperform; in the FIDE World Chess Championship 2004, Chess World Cup 2005, Chess World Cup 2007, and Chess World Cup 2009, he failed to advance past the third round despite being seeded No. 5, No. 1, No. 1 and No. 6 respectively in those events.

Ivanchuk's world championship aspirations were also dampened by the title split from 1993 to 2006. Due to obligations with FIDE, Ivanchuk and Anand did not participate in the 2002 Dortmund Candidates tournament for the Classical World Chess Championship 2004. He was then narrowly excluded, on the basis of rating, from the rival FIDE World Chess Championship 2005. While he won one of the events of the FIDE Grand Prix 2008–2010, his overall performance was not enough to qualify him for the World Chess Championship 2012 candidates tournament.

=== Since 2013 ===
Ivanchuk played in the 2013 Candidates Tournament, which took place in London, from 15 March to 1 April. He finished seventh, with a score of +3−5=6. The tournament was notable for his unusually poor time management (he lost two games on time), as well as his major impact on the leaderboard despite being a tail ender: he managed to defeat both leaders Magnus Carlsen (round 12) and Vladimir Kramnik (round 14), resulting in Carlsen qualifying for the World Chess Championship by tiebreak.

In 2016, Ivanchuk won the World Rapid Chess Championship in Doha, Qatar, with a score of 11/15. He defeated Carlsen, among many others.

In July 2016, Ivanchuk began playing checkers and has achieved a certain level of success. In the World Draughts Federation's database, he achieved his peak rating of 1997 in July 2019, and his peak ranking at No. 1050 in July 2024.

== Playing style ==
Ivanchuk is noted for creative technical play, often seeking imbalances and breaking accepted principles. He sacrifices material after deep calculation.

His chess.com profile describes his playing style as "one of the most creative and unpredictable styles of play in recent history." saying he has a "unique universal style" while being capable of "imaginative play and unexpected sacrifices."

== Assessment and personality ==
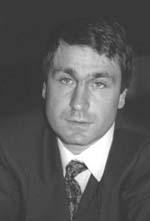
Ivanchuk in 2004

The Oxford Companion to Chess (1992) describes Ivanchuk as follows:

Although blessed with great energy and ability, Ivanchuk is also moody and emotional. Losing his temper, he has been known to sweep the pieces from the board during a tournament. Seen by some as an anti-hero, he says, 'What's the good of setting goals when their achievement is never in one's own hands?'

The Mammoth Book of the World's Greatest Chess Games (1998) states:

If he were able to make the most of his talent, he would surely be a real contender for World No. 1 spot, but he is a highly emotional player, who takes losses badly, tends to rush critical decisions when under pressure and sometimes lacks motivation.

Viswanathan Anand said in 2004 that Ivanchuk was the "most eccentric" player he had met:

He's someone who is very intelligent...but you never know which mood he is going to be in. Some days he will treat you like his long-lost brother. The next day he ignores you completely. The players have a word for him. They say he lives on 'Planet Ivanchuk'. I have seen him totally drunk and singing Ukrainian poetry and then the next day I have seen him give an impressive talk.

When asked in 2012 to name the chess players she considered geniuses, Judit Polgár named only Ivanchuk, Carlsen, and Anand. Before the 2013 Candidates Tournament, Gawain Jones stated that Ivanchuk was "[o]ne of the most talented players, possibly the most talented ever". In 2017, Garry Kasparov said that Ivanchuk belonged in the same category as the world chess champions.

Ivanchuk played board 1 for Ukraine in the 2008 Chess Olympiad in Dresden, Germany. Going into the last round, Ukraine was second with decent chances of placing first, and only a strong loss against a 10th-seeded U.S. would leave them without a medal. Ivanchuk was chosen to be tested for illegal substances in his system immediately after the last round. But in a major upset, Ivanchuk lost his game against Gata Kamsky, causing Ukraine to fall to fourth and miss out on a medal. U.S. defeated Ukraine 3½ to ½. Ivanchuk was so distraught after the game that he was seen "kicking a large concrete pillar". He refused to take a doping test and stormed out, risking punishment under FIDE rules and forfeiting his games in the event as had happened in the 2004 Chess Olympiad in Mallorca. Ivanchuk was cleared when it emerged that he had not been warned of the test, and that in his distraught frame of mind, he had not fully understood the arbiter's request.

After a string of unsuccessful performances culminated in his elimination at the early stages of the 2009 World Cup, Ivanchuk announced, in a highly emotional interview, his retirement from professional chess, but he soon reversed that decision.

== Notable tournament victories ==
- Lviv 1987, 11½/17 1st
- New York Open 1988, 1st
- Debrecen 1988, 10 8/11 1st
- Linares 1989, 7/10 1st
- Yerevan 1989, 8½/11 1st
- Biel 1989, 9/14 1–2
- Tilburg 1990, 8½/14 1–2
- Linares 1991, 9½/13 1st
- Reykjavik 10½/15, 1–2
- Munich 1994, 7½/11 1st
- Linares 1995, 10/13 1st
- Horgen GER 1995, 7/10 1–2
- Wijk aan Zee 1996, 9/13 1st
- Belgrade 1997 6/9, 1–2
- Tallinn 2000 6/7, 1st
- Montecatini Terme 2000, 5/7 1st
- Malmö 2003, 13 7/9 1st
- European Individual Chess Championship 2004
- European Rapid Chess Championship 2004
- La Habana 2005, 9½/12 1st
- Barcelona 2005, 4/5 1–2
- Canadian Open Chess Championship 2005, Joint 1st
- Tallinn 2006, 7/9 1–3
- Odesa 2006, 7/9 1st
- Mérida 2006, 1st
- Odesa 2007, 7/9 1st
- La Habana 2007, 7½/9 1st
- Foros 2007, 7½/11 1st
- FIDE World Blitz Chess Champion 2007
- Montreal International 2007
- M-Tel Masters, Sofia 2008 8/10 2008, 1st
- Tal Memorial, Moscow 2008, 6/9 1st
- Tal Memorial (Blitz), Moscow 2008, 1st
- Linares 2009 8/14, Joint 1st (Alexander Grischuk declared winner because of higher number of wins)
- Bazna 2009, 7/10 1st
- Jermuk 2009, 8½/13 1st
- Amber Rapid 2010, 8/11 Joint 1st (with Magnus Carlsen)
- Amber Overall 2010, Joint 1st (with Magnus Carlsen)
- Capablanca Memorial Havana 2010, 7/10 1st
- Cap d'Agde Rapid 2010, 1st
- Gibraltar 2011, 9/10 1st
- Capablanca Memorial Havana, Cuba 2011, 6½/10 1st
- Grand Slam Bilbao – São Paulo 2011, Joint 1st (Magnus Carlsen wins the tie-break blitz games)
- Capablanca Memorial Havana, Cuba 2012, 6½/10, 1st.
- Edmonton International 2014, 8/9 1st
- Capablanca Memorial Havana, Cuba 2016, 7/10, 1st
- World Rapid Championship 2016, 1st
- Capablanca Memorial Havana, Cuba 2019, 7/10, 1st
- Menorca Open 2025, 8/9 1st

== Team chess performances ==
Vasyl Ivanchuk
Medal record

Chess Olympiad

Representing Soviet Union
Gold medal – first place	Thessaloniki 1988	Open
Gold medal – first place	Novi Sad 1990	Open

Representing Ukraine
Gold medal – first place	Calvià 2004	Open
Gold medal – first place	Khanty-Mansiysk 2010	Open
Silver medal – second place	Yerevan 1996	Open
Bronze medal – third place	Elista 1998	Open
Bronze medal – third place	Istanbul 2000	Open
Bronze medal – third place	Istanbul 2012	Open

Ivanchuk has often been at his best in international team competitions. He has played in 14 Chess Olympiads, twice for the Soviet Union (1988 and 1990), and twelve times for Ukraine, after the Soviet Union split up in 1991. He has won a total of thirteen medals, and has been on four gold-medal winning teams (USSR in 1988 and 1990, Ukraine in 2004 and 2010). In 162 games, Ivanchuk has scored (+63 =87 -12), for 65.7 per cent. His detailed Olympiad records are as follows:

- Thessaloniki 1988, USSR 2nd reserve, 6½/9 (+4 −0 =5), team gold
- Novi Sad 1990, USSR board 1, 7/10 (+5 −1 =4), team gold, perf. bronze
- Manila 1992, Ukraine board 1, 8½/13 (+6 −1 =5)
- Moscow 1994, Ukraine board 1, 9½/14 (+5 −0 =9)
- Yerevan 1996, Ukraine board 1, 8½/11 (+6 −0 =5), team silver, board bronze, perf. silver
- Elista 1998, Ukraine board 1, 7/11 (+3 −0 =8), team bronze
- Istanbul 2000, Ukraine board 1, 9/14 (+4 −0 =10), team bronze
- Bled 2002, Ukraine board 2, 9/14 (+4 −0 =10)
- Calvià 2004, Ukraine board 1, 9½/13 (+6 −0 =7), team gold, perf. bronze
- Turin 2006, Ukraine board 1, 8/13 (+4 −1 =8)
- Dresden 2008, Ukraine board 1, 6/11 (+3 −2 =6)
- Khanty-Mansiysk 2010, Ukraine board 1, 8/10 (+7 −1 =2), team gold, board gold
- Istanbul 2012, Ukraine board 1, 6/10 (+4 –2 =4), team bronze
- Tromsø 2014, Ukraine board 1, 4/9 (+2 –3 =4)

== Notable games ==
Ivanchuk vs. Kasparov, Linares 1991

Position: c8 white knight, e8 black bishop, f8 black bishop, g8 black rook, h8 black queen, f7 black pawn, h7 black king, f6 white queen, a5 black pawn, b5 white pawn, c5 black pawn, f5 black pawn, g5 white pawn, a4 white pawn, f4 white knight, h4 white rook, h3 white pawn, h1 white king

Final position
- Ivanchuk vs Kasparov, Linares 1991

At round one of Linares in 1991, the 21-year-old Ivanchuk gave up both his bishops for knights and then boxed Kasparov, then world champion, into complete passivity.

== Personal life ==
Ivanchuk was married to Russian Woman Grandmaster Alisa Galliamova.

On November 18, 2006, he married for the second time.

In 2011, Ivanchuk and his second wife were mugged the day they were set to leave from São Paulo, Brazil, on a plane bound for Spain to finish the second half of the Bilbao Grand Slam Masters. Ivanchuk threatened to withdraw from the tournament altogether, but his wife convinced him to continue. He had been leading in the tournament before this event, but did not play as well in the second half of the tournament.

== Awards and honors ==
- 20 Years of Independence of Ukraine Medal
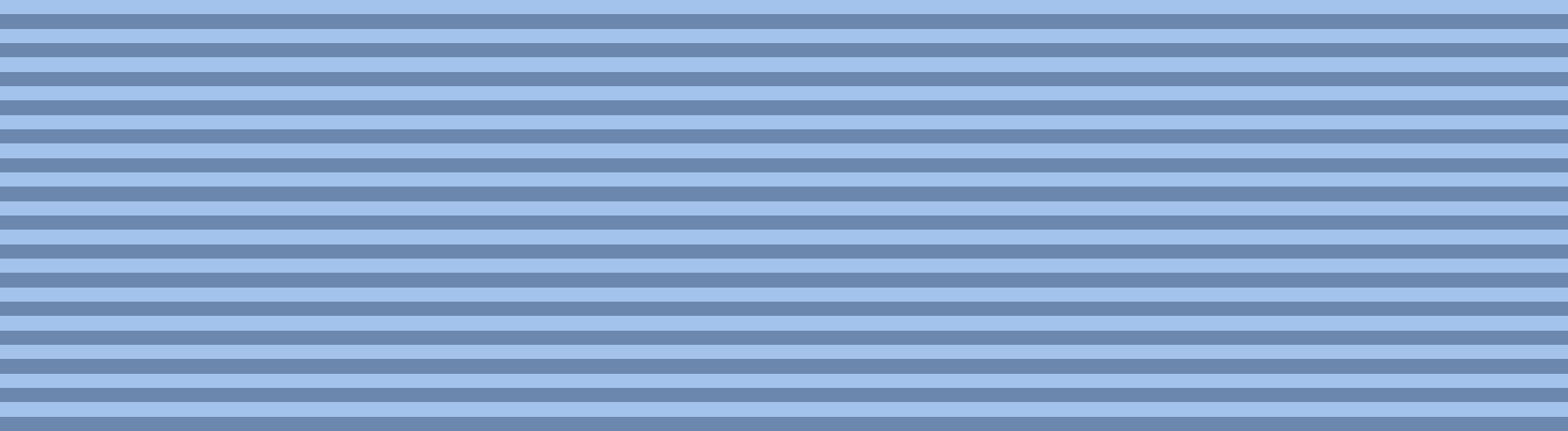
- Order of Prince Yaroslav the Wise (5th class)
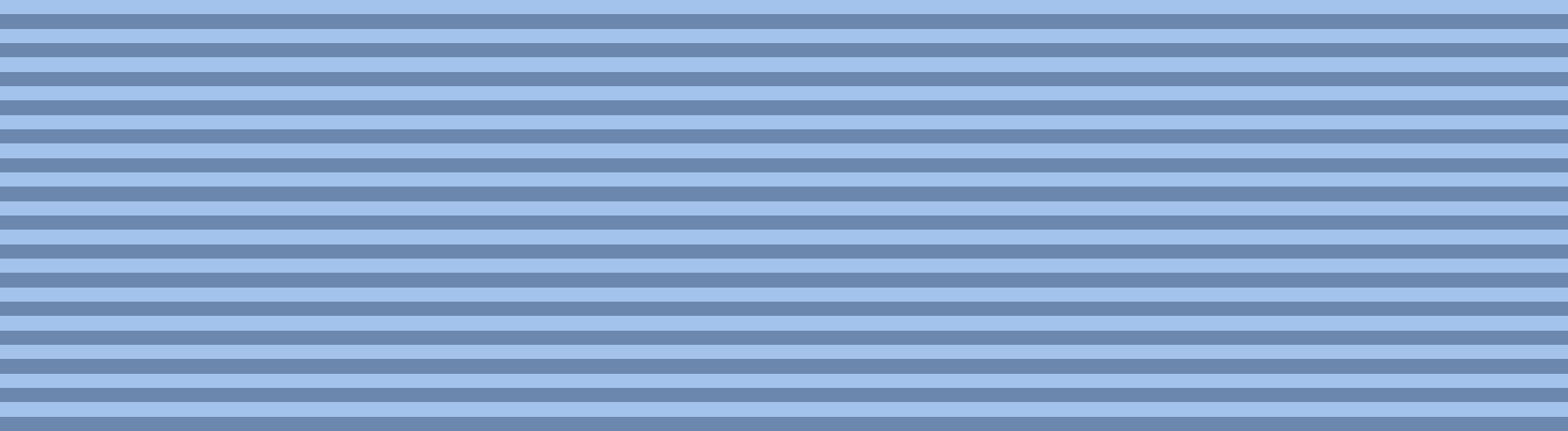
- Order of Prince Yaroslav the Wise (4th class)
- Order of Merit (2nd class)
- Order of Merit (1st class)

== Notes ==
Awards
Preceded by Alexander Grischuk	World Blitz Chess Champion; 2007	Succeeded by Leinier Domínguez
Preceded by Magnus Carlsen	World Rapid Chess Champion; 2016	Succeeded by Viswanathan Anand
