= M-Tel Masters =

Chess tournament in Sofia, Bulgaria (2005–09)

Tournament information
- Sport: Chess
- Location: Sofia, Bulgaria
- Established: 2005
- Defunct: 2009
- Format: Round-robin tournament
- Most championships: (Bulgaria) Veselin Topalov (3)

Final champion
- (Spain) Alexei Shirov

Mtel Masters was an annual super-GM chess tournament held between 2005 and 2009 in Sofia, Bulgaria, sponsored and organized by the Bulgarian mobile network operator, M-Tel. The tournament was held as a double round-robin at the five-star Grand Hotel Sofia.

== Tournament winners ==
M-Tel Masters Sofia
No.	Date	Category	Average FIDE Rating	Winner	Score	TPR
1	11–22 May 2005	XX	2747	Veselin Topalov (Bulgaria)	6½ / 10	2850
2	10–21 May 2006	XX	2745	Veselin Topalov (Bulgaria)	6½ / 10	2842
3	9–20 May 2007	XIX	2725	Veselin Topalov (Bulgaria)	5½ / 10	2751
4	8–18 May 2008	XX	2738	Vasyl Ivanchuk (Ukraine)	8 / 10	2977
5	12–23 May 2009	XXI	2755	Alexei Shirov (Spain)	6½ / 10	2867

== Editions ==
=== 2005 ===
The first edition of the tournament took place between 11 and 22 May 2005 as part of M-Tel's tenth anniversary celebrations and with the participation of top chess players such as Viswanathan Anand, Veselin Topalov, Vladimir Kramnik, Michael Adams, Judit Polgár and Ruslan Ponomariov. M-Tel Masters 2005 was classified in FIDE's Category 20 and was named the strongest tournament of 2005 according to the average Elo rating of the participants of 2744. The winner of the tournament was the Bulgarian Veselin Topalov, with the award being conferred by President Georgi Parvanov.

1st M-Tel Masters, 12–22 May 2005, Sofia, Bulgaria, Category XX (2747)
	Player	Rating	1	2	3	4	5	6	Points	TPR
1	Veselin Topalov (Bulgaria)	2778		½ 1	½ ½	0 1	½ 1	½ 1	6½	2850
2	Viswanathan Anand (India)	2785	½ 0		½ ½	½ ½	½ 1	½ 1	5½	2775
3	Judit Polgár (Hungary)	2732	½ ½	½ ½		½ ½	0 ½	½ 1	5	2749
4	Ruslan Ponomariov (Ukraine)	2695	1 0	½ ½	½ ½		0 1	½ ½	5	2757
5	Vladimir Kramnik (Russia)	2753	½ 0	½ 0	1 ½	1 0		0 ½	4	2673
6	Michael Adams (England)	2737	½ 0	½ 0	½ 0	½ ½	1 ½		4	2676

=== 2006 ===
The 2006 tournament took place between 10 May and 21 May and was attended by Veselin Topalov, Viswanathan Anand, Ruslan Ponomariov, Peter Svidler, Étienne Bacrot and Gata Kamsky. Brazilian writer Paulo Coelho played the token initial move of the 2006 tournament, which was officially opened by the President of Bulgaria, Georgi Parvanov.

Topalov won the tournament for the second time after a decisive comeback from a somewhat hesitant start. He recorded four consecutive wins in the final rounds to clinch the M-Tel Masters 2006 first place with 6½ points, also defeating his main rival Gata Kamsky in the penultimate round.

2nd M-Tel Masters, 11–21 May 2006, Sofia, Bulgaria, Category XX (2745)
	Player	Rating	1	2	3	4	5	6	Points	Wins	TPR
1	Veselin Topalov (Bulgaria)	2804		1 1	0 1	½ 0	½ 1	½ 1	6½		2842
2	Gata Kamsky (United States)	2671	0 0		1 ½	1 ½	½ 1	1 ½	6		2831
3	Viswanathan Anand (India)	2803	1 0	0 ½		½ ½	1 ½	1 ½	5½		2768
4	Peter Svidler (Russia)	2743	½ 1	0 ½	½ ½		1 0	½ ½	5		2744
5	Ruslan Ponomariov (Ukraine)	2738	½ 0	½ 0	0 ½	0 1		½ ½	3½	1	2635
6	Étienne Bacrot (France)	2708	½ 0	0 ½	0 ½	½ ½	½ ½		3½	0	2641

=== 2007 ===
M-Tel Masters' 2007 edition was held between 9 May and 20 May and featured Veselin Topalov, Liviu-Dieter Nisipeanu, Shakhriyar Mamedyarov, Gata Kamsky, Michael Adams and Krishnan Sasikiran. Topalov won the tournament for a third consecutive time in a dramatic fashion, defeating the then-current leader Sasikiran in the final round.

3rd M-Tel Masters, 10–20 May 2007, Sofia, Bulgaria, Category XIX (2725)
	Player	Rating	1	2	3	4	5	6	Points	Wins	H2H	SB	Moves	TPR
1	Veselin Topalov (Bulgaria)	2772		1 1	0 ½	½ ½	0 1	½ ½	5½					2751
2	Krishnan Sasikiran (India)	2690	0 0		½ 1	1 0	½ ½	½ 1	5	3				2732
3	Shakhriyar Mamedyarov (Azerbaijan)	2757	1 ½	½ 0		1 0	½ ½	½ ½	5	2	2	25.25		2718
4	Gata Kamsky (United States)	2705	½ ½	0 1	0 1		½ ½	½ ½	5	2	2	25.00	547	2729
5	Liviu-Dieter Nisipeanu (Romania)	2693	1 0	½ ½	½ ½	½ ½		0 1	5	2	2	25.00	419	2731
6	Michael Adams (England)	2734	½ ½	½ 0	½ ½	½ ½	1 0		4½					2687

=== 2008 ===
The 2008 M-Tel Masters was held 8–18 May. Vasyl Ivanchuk won by a wide margin. Ivanchuk won his first five games, lost no games, and had a positive score against every other player. Veselin Topalov, who had won the tournament the three previous years, was second.

4th M-Tel Masters, 8–18 May 2008, Sofia, Bulgaria, Category XX (2738)
	Player	Rating	1	2	3	4	5	6	Points	TPR
1	Vasyl Ivanchuk (Ukraine)	2740		1 ½	1 ½	1 1	1 ½	1 ½	8	2977
2	Veselin Topalov (Bulgaria)	2767	0 ½		½ ½	1 1	1 0	1 1	6½	2841
3	Teimour Radjabov (Azerbaijan)	2751	0 ½	½ ½		½ ½	½ 1	½ 1	5½	2771
4	Ivan Cheparinov (Bulgaria)	2695	0 0	0 0	½ ½		1 1	½ ½	4	2674
5	Bu Xiangzhi (China)	2708	0 ½	0 1	½ 0	0 0		½ ½	3	2594
6	Levon Aronian (Armenia)	2763	0 ½	0 0	½ 0	½ ½	½ ½		3	2583

=== 2009 ===
The 2009 edition of the tournament took place from 12 to 23 May. Besides regular feature Veselin Topalov, the participating grandmasters were Magnus Carlsen, Vasyl Ivanchuk, Alexei Shirov, Wang Yue and Leinier Domínguez.

5th M-Tel Masters, 13–23 May 2009, Sofia, Bulgaria, Category XXI (2755)
	Player	Rating	1	2	3	4	5	6	Points	Wins	H2H	TPR
1	Alexei Shirov (Spain)	2745		1 ½	½ ½	½ ½	½ ½	1 1	6½			2867
2	Magnus Carlsen (Norway)	2770	0 ½		1 ½	½ 1	½ 1	½ ½	6	3	1½	2824
3	Veselin Topalov (Bulgaria)	2812	½ ½	0 ½		1 ½	½ ½	1 1	6	3	½	2816
4	Wang Yue (China)	2738	½ ½	½ 0	0 ½		½ ½	1 ½	4½			2723
5	Leinier Domínguez (Cuba)	2721	½ ½	½ 0	½ ½	½ ½		½ 0	4			2690
6	Vasyl Ivanchuk (Ukraine)	2746	0 0	½ ½	0 0	0 ½	½ 1		3			2608

=== 2010 ===
The tournament was cancelled because of the World Chess Championship 2010 match in Sofia.
