= Veselin Topalov =

Bulgarian chess grandmaster (born 1975)

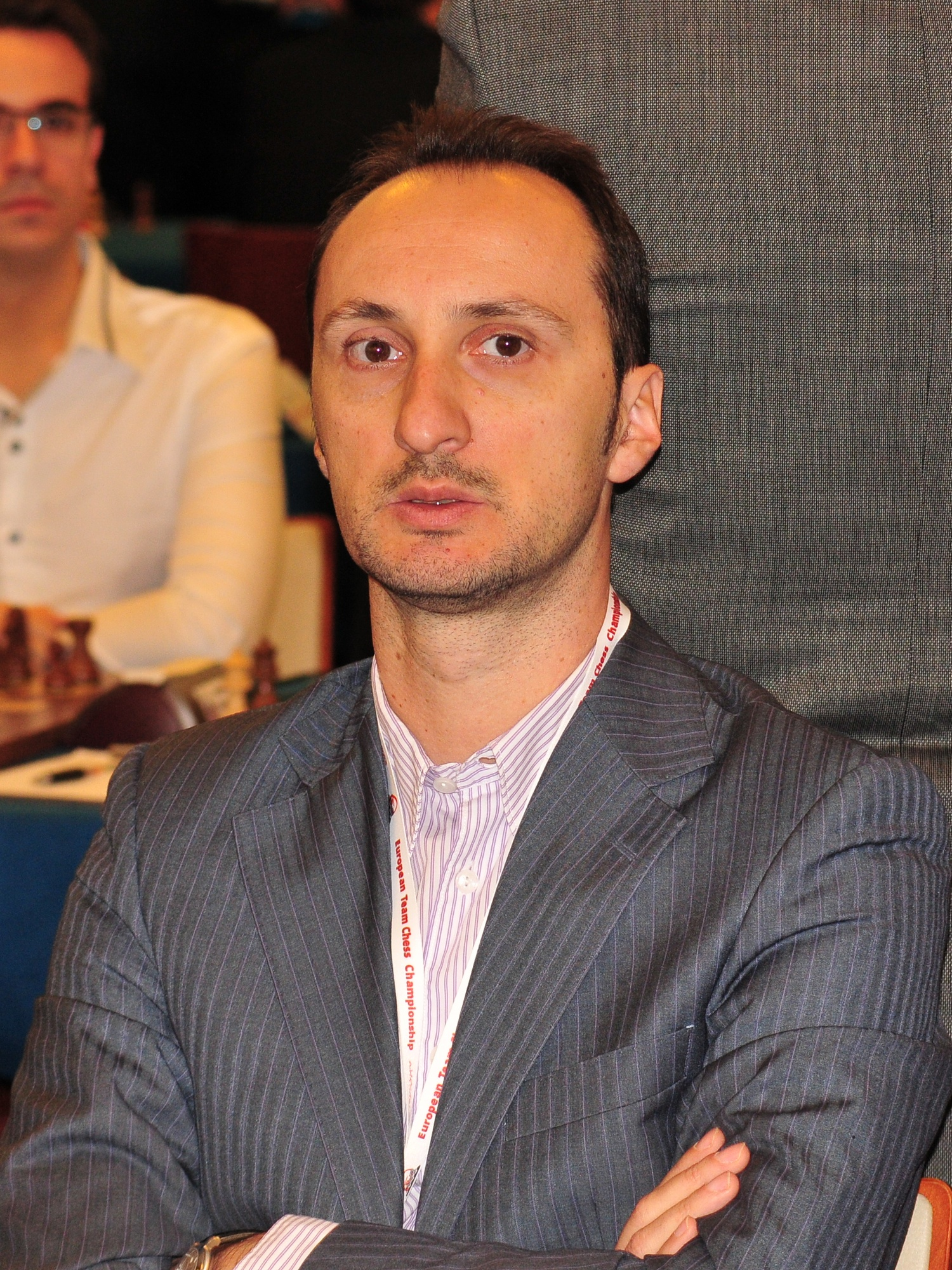
- Topalov in 2013

Personal information
- Born: Veselin Aleksandrov Topalov; 15 March 1975 (age 51) Ruse, Bulgaria

Chess career
- Country: Bulgaria
- Title: Grandmaster (1992)
- World Champion: 2005–2006 (FIDE)
- FIDE rating: 2695 (November 2026)
- Peak rating: 2816 (July 2015)
- Ranking: No. 33 (November 2026)
- Peak ranking: No. 1 (April 2006)

Veselin Aleksandrov Topalov (Bulgarian: Весели́н Алексáндров Топа́лов, pronounced [vɛsɛˈlin toˈpalof]; born 15 March 1975) is a Bulgarian chess grandmaster and former FIDE World Chess Champion.

Topalov became FIDE World Chess Champion by winning the FIDE World Chess Championship 2005. He lost his title in the World Chess Championship 2006 against Vladimir Kramnik. He challenged Viswanathan Anand at the World Chess Championship 2010, losing 6½–5½. He won the 2005 Chess Oscar.

He was ranked world number one from April 2006 to January 2007. He regained the top ranking in October 2008 until January 2010. His peak rating was 2816 in July 2015, placing him joint-tenth on the list of highest FIDE-rated players of all time.

Topalov has competed at nine Chess Olympiads (1994–2000, 2008–2016), winning board one gold in 2014 and scoring best overall performance in 1994. He also won in Linares, Corus, Dortmund, Stavanger and Pearl Spring tournaments.

Topalov is married and has two daughters. Now he lives in Salamanca, Spain.

== Career ==
=== Early career ===
Topalov was born in Ruse, Bulgaria. His father taught him to play chess at the age of eight. Topalov quickly established himself as a chess prodigy. At age 12, Topalov began working with the controversial Silvio Danailov, a relationship that continues today.

In 1989 he won the World Under-14 Championship in Aguadilla, Puerto Rico, and in 1990 won the silver medal at the World Under-16 Championship in Singapore. He became a Grandmaster in 1992 and won in Terrassa. He shared first at the Budapest Zonal group B in 1993 but struggled at the Biel Interzonal, scoring 5.5/13. He made his Olympiad debut in Moscow 1994, leading Bulgaria to a fourth-place, defeating Garry Kasparov on board one.

Over the next ten years Topalov ascended the world chess rankings. He played in Linares 1994 (6½/13), Linares 1995 (8/13), Amsterdam 1995. In a strong run of tournament performances in 1996 he placed third at Wijk aan Zee, tied for first at Amsterdam, Vienna and Madrid, won outright at Novgorod and shared first in Dos Hermanas. As early as 1996, he was being invited to events for the world's elite such as Las Palmas (5/10), the first category 21 tournament, played in December 1996, with Kasparov, Anand, Kramnik and Karpov participating. The next year he won at Antwerp and Madrid.

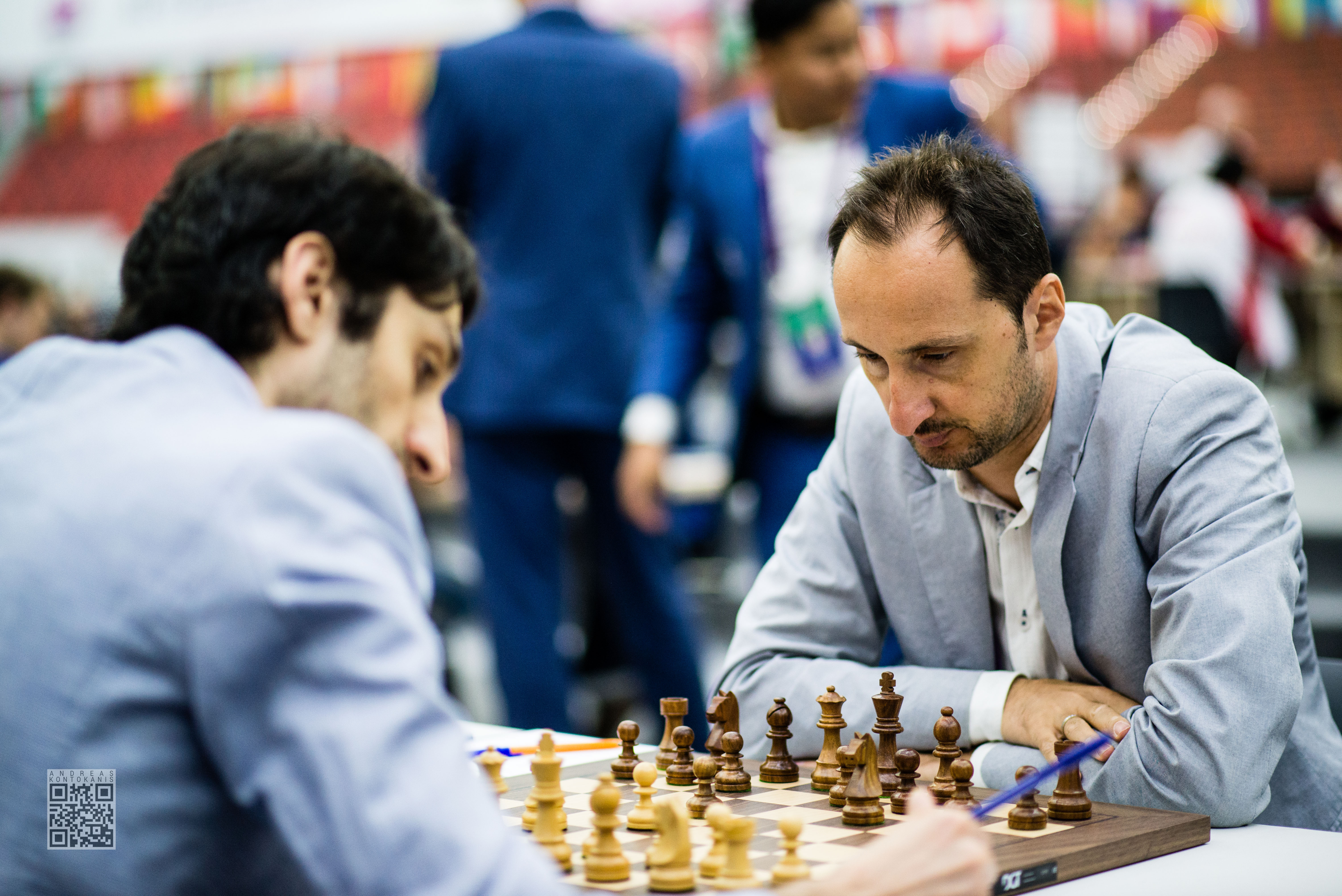
Against Baadur Jobava

Topalov's loss to reigning Classical World Champion Garry Kasparov at the 1999 Corus chess tournament is generally hailed as one of the greatest games ever played. Kasparov later said, "He looked up. Perhaps there was a sign from above that Topalov would play a great game today. It takes two, you know, to do that."

In 2001, he shared the overall title at Amber Melody and won at Dortmund.

In the knockout tournaments for the FIDE World Chess Championship, he reached the last 16 in 1999, the quarter-finals in 2000, the final 16 in 2001, and the semifinals in the 2004 tournament. In 2002, he lost the final of the Dortmund Candidates Tournament (for the right to challenge for the rival Classical World Chess Championship) to Peter Leko.

Topalov tied for first at the 2002 NAO Chess Masters in Cannes and won at Benidorm in 2003.

Topalov scored his first major success at Linares 2005, tying for first place with Garry Kasparov (though losing on tiebreak rules), and defeating Kasparov in the last round, in what was to be Kasparov's last tournament game before his retirement. He followed this up with a one-point victory at M-Tel Masters. In 2006 he tied for first at Corus with Anand.

=== 2005–2006: FIDE world chess champion ===
Based on his rating, Topalov was invited to the eight-player, double round-robin FIDE World Chess Championship in San Luis, Argentina, in September–October 2005. Scoring 6½/7 in the first cycle, Topalov had virtually clinched the tournament at the halfway mark, before drawing every game in the second cycle to win by 1½ points to become FIDE World Chess Champion. The average rating of the field in the championship was 2739, and Topalov's performance rating was 2890.

On 16 April 2006, FIDE President Kirsan Ilyumzhinov announced that a match between Classical and FIDE World Champions Kramnik and Topalov would be held in September–October 2006 to re-unify the Championships after thirteen years of separation. Kramnik defeated Topalov to become the first undisputed champion in thirteen years.

On 28 September 2006, Topalov's manager Silvio Danailov published a press release, casting suspicion on Kramnik's behaviour during the games. The Bulgarian team made a public statement that Kramnik visited his private bathroom (the only place without any audio or video surveillance) unreasonably often, about fifty times per game (a number that FIDE officials later claimed to be exaggerated) and made the most significant decisions in the game in the bathroom.

They also demanded that the organizers of the tournament allow journalists access to the surveillance video from Kramnik's room for games 1 through 4. The organizers made parts of the video available, explaining that other parts of it were missing due to technical issues. Danailov demanded to stop the use of private restrooms and bathrooms, and threatened to reconsider Topalov's participation in the match. The Appeals Committee that governed the match agreed, and ruled that the players' private restrooms should be closed and replaced with a shared one.

Kramnik refused to play game 5 and was forfeited. On 1 October, the restroom issue was resolved in Kramnik's favour and the Appeals Committee resigned and were replaced. The FIDE president Kirsan Ilyumzhinov decided that the current score of 3–2 should be preserved. He also indicated that this was not a compromise decision but his own. The match resumed on 2 October 2006.

On 1 October, the Association of Chess Professionals released a statement denouncing Danailov for publicly accusing his opponent without evidence, and calling for him to be investigated by the FIDE Ethics Committee.

On 3 October, Topalov said in a press conference, "I believe that his (Kramnik's) play is fair, and my decision to continue the match proves it". However, the next day, the crisis escalated, with Topalov's manager strongly implying that Kramnik was receiving computer assistance.

On 14 December 2006, Topalov directly accused Kramnik of using computer assistance in their World Championship match. On 14 February 2007, Topalov's manager released pictures, purporting to show cables in the ceiling of a toilet used by Kramnik during the World Championship match in Elista. They were supposedly reported to the authorities, who Danailov claims suppressed the information. The Topalov team claims they were pressured by officials to keep their allegations quiet. On 29 July 2007, following a complaint by Kramnik's manager Carsten Hensel, the FIDE Ethics Commission sanctioned Topalov with "a severe reprimand" because of the accusations made in the interview of 14 December. According to the Ethics Commission, "these statements were clearly defamatory and damaged the honour of Mr. Vladimir Kramnik, harming his personal and professional reputation".

=== 2006–2010 ===
Soon after losing the match, Topalov finished third of four players in Essent with only 2½/6, losing both games against Judit Polgár and one against Shakhriyar Mamedyarov.

In May 2006, Topalov defended his M-Tel Masters title, coming first with 6½/10, a half point ahead of Gata Kamsky.

In January 2007, Topalov finished in joint first place at Corus along with Levon Aronian and Teimour Radjabov.

In May 2007, Topalov won the M-Tel Masters tournament for a third consecutive time with 5½/10, defeating then-leader Sasikiran in the final round.

In November 2007, Topalov won the Vitoria Gasteiz charity event.

Topalov won the 14th Ciudad Dos Hermanas Rapid, 17–21 April 2008, defeating GM Francisco Vallejo Pons of Spain 2½–1½ in the final match by winning the first game and drawing the remaining three.

In September 2008, Topalov won the Bilbao 2008 tournament. Following this victory, he became the world number one on the official October 2008 ratings list. He also won the Pearl Spring event held in Nanjing as well as Villarobledo Chess Festival.

Topalov lost his chance to compete in the 2007 world championship tournament when he lost the 2006 reunification match. Danailov expressed a desire for a rematch between Topalov and Kramnik, proposing a match in March 2007, though no such match took place. The issue was settled in June 2007, when Topalov and Kramnik were granted special privileges in the 2008–09 championship cycle. Topalov was given direct entry to a "Challenger Match" against the winner of the Chess World Cup 2007.

The 2007 Chess World Cup was won by Gata Kamsky. The Challenger Match between Topalov and Kamsky took place in February 2009 in Sofia. Topalov won the match 4½–2½.

Topalov won the 2010 Linares chess tournament held in February, defeating Boris Gelfand in the last round.

=== 2010 World Championship ===
Before the 2010 World Chess Championship match with Veselin Topalov, Viswanathan Anand, who had booked on the flight Frankfurt–Sofia on 16 April, was stranded due to the cancellation of all flights following the volcano ash cloud from Eyjafjallajökull. Anand asked for a three-day postponement, which the Bulgarian organisers refused on 19 April. Anand eventually reached Sofia on 20 April, after a 40-hour road journey. Consequently, the first game was delayed by one day.

The match consisted of 12 games. In Game 1, Topalov quickly defeated Anand in 30 moves, utilizing a very sharp line of attack that broke through Anand's Grunfeld Defence. It was revealed afterwards that Topalov had found the line during his opening preparation, with the help of a powerful supercomputer loaned to him by Bulgaria's Defense Department. Anand quickly responded with a win in Game 2, employing a novelty out of the Catalan Opening that was not easily recognized by computers at the time (15. Qa3!?, followed by 16. bxa3!). Anand would win again with the Catalan in Game 4, only to drop Game 8 and leave the score level once again. After 11 games the score was tied at 5½–5½. Anand won game 12 on the Black side of a Queen's Gambit Declined to win the game and the match. Topalov chose to accept a pawn sacrifice by Anand, hoping to force a result and avoid a rapid chess tiebreak round. But after Topalov's dubious 31st and 32nd moves, Anand used the sacrifice to obtain a strong attack against Topalov's relatively exposed king. Topalov subsequently resigned, allowing Anand to retain the World Championship.

World Chess Championship Match 2010
	Rating	1	2	3	4	5	6	7	8	9	10	11	12	Total
Viswanathan Anand (India)	2787	0	1	½	1	½	½	½	0	½	½	½	1	6½
Veselin Topalov (Bulgaria)	2805	1	0	½	0	½	½	½	1	½	½	½	0	5½

As runner-up in the World Chess Championship 2010, Topalov automatically qualified for the Candidates Matches for the World Chess Championship 2012, where he was the top seed. However, he lost to newly crowned U.S. champion Gata Kamsky in the quarterfinals. Later that year he won the King's Tournament in Romania.

=== 2013 ===
- Topalov competed in the FIDE Grand Prix 2012–13. Having won in London's Grand Prix event in 2012, in April 2013, he won the 2013 Renova Grand Prix in Zug, 1.5 points ahead of second-place Hikaru Nakamura. This marked his comeback as one of the top five players in the world, as this victory propelled him to the fourth place on the FIDE rating list.
- By scoring 100 points in the 2013 Grand Prix in Beijing, he guaranteed himself a first-place finish with one tournament to spare, thus qualifying for the 2014 Candidates Tournament.
- Topalov played in the 2013 edition of the Norway Chess Tournament. He placed 8th with 4 out of 9 possible points +0-1=8.
- From 18 to 25 September 2013, Topalov played a 6-game match with Viktor Láznička. Time control was 40/90 + G/30 with 30 seconds increment per move. Topalov won the match 4-2.

=== 2014 ===
- Topalov competed at the Candidates Tournament 2014 in Khanty-Mansiysk, Russia. He finished in last place, scoring +2-4=7.
- Topalov played in the 2014 edition of the Norway Chess Tournament. He placed 5th with 4.5 out of 9 possible points.
- Topalov played in the 41st Chess Olympiad in Tromsø, where he won the gold medal on board one, with the second best overall tournament performance of 2872.
- In August–September 2014, Topalov played in the Sinquefield Cup 2014, where he came in 3rd place behind winner Fabiano Caruana and runner-up Magnus Carlsen.
- Topalov participated in the 2014 European Club Cup in mid-September 2014.

=== 2015 ===
- Topalov came third at the Gibraltar Masters.
- Topalov competed in the 2015 Grand Chess Tour, consisting of Norway Chess, the Sinquefield Cup, and the London Chess Classic. At Norway Chess 2015, Topalov won clear first place with 6.5/9, earning him 13 Grand Chess Tour points. He scored +5-1=3. At the 2015 Sinquefield Cup, Topalov finished in a tie for sixth place with a score of +2-2=5. In the London Chess Classic in December 2015, he came in last, scoring +0-4=5.
- He played in the Chess World Cup 2015 in Baku, Azerbaijan as the top seed. He was eliminated by Peter Svidler in the fourth round.

=== 2016 ===
- Topalov participated in the Candidates Tournament, held in Moscow, Russia from 10–30 March 2016, as a rating qualifier. Topalov finished in last place, losing 5 games (+0-5=9).
- Topalov participated in the Paris Grand Prix, part of the Grand Prix cycle. Topalov scored 12/36 for ninth place.
- Topalov participated in the Leuven leg of the 2016 Grand Chess Tour. Topalov scored 14/36 points, which placed him in 10th place in the tournament.

=== 2017 ===
He played many games against Caruana, Carlsen, Hikaru and others at the GCT Blitz Paris 2017. Topalov then played matches with Hikaru Nakamura at Champions Showdown G10 G5, in Saint Louis, USA.

=== 2018 ===
In April 2018, he participated in the fifth edition of Shamkir Chess, finishing eighth with a score of 4/9 (+2–3=4).

=== 2024 ===
Topalov played in the Leon Masters (2024) - Topalov competed in a four-player knockout rapid and blitz event in Spain, facing Viswanathan Anand and Arjun Erigaisi. He also played exhibition/rapid matches at the Clash of Generations (2024).

=== 2025 ===
At the Superbet Rapid & Blitz Poland (2025) Topalov played rapid and blitz games against top grandmasters like Maxime Vachier-Lagrave, Levon Aronian, Alireza Firouzja, and Praggnanandhaa.

=== 2026 ===
- Topalov defeated GM Garry Kasparov to win the 2026 Clutch Chess : The Legends - Chess960 match after three days. Topalov scored 11-1 in blitz game points alone to prevail with a final score of 16-8.

== Team results ==
Topalov has competed on first board at nine Chess Olympiads (1994-2000, 2008-2016), winning individual gold in 2014 and scoring best overall performance in 1994.

Olympiad	Board	Individual result	Team result
Moscow 1994	First	8.5/12	Fifth
Yerevan 1996	First	5.5/10	40th
Elista 1998	First	8/11	17th
Istanbul 2000	First	8/11	14th
Dresden 2008	First	6.5/8	14th
Khanty-Mansiysk 2010	First	5/9	31st
Istanbul 2012	First	7/10	20th
Tromso 2014	First	6.5/9	23rd
Baku 2016	First	3/5	66th

== Notable games ==
Topalov vs. Ponomariov, Sofia 2005

Position: a8 black rook, b8 black knight, d8 black queen, f8 black rook, g8 black king, a7 black pawn, g7 black pawn, a6 black bishop, e6 black pawn, f6 black bishop, h6 black pawn, c5 black pawn, c4 white pawn, d4 black pawn, h4 white pawn, b3 white pawn, c3 white rook, f3 white knight, g3 white pawn, a2 white pawn, c2 white queen, d2 white bishop, f2 white pawn, b1 white bishop, e1 white king, h1 white rook

After 17 moves, Topalov initiates a series of strong tactical blows with the sacrifice of a knight and a rook.

On the way to winning M-Tel Masters in 2005, Topalov defeated former FIDE world champion Ruslan Ponomariov with the white pieces in a Queen's Indian Defense.

Topalov vs. Ponomariov, Sofia 2005
1.d4 Nf6 2.c4 e6 3.Nf3 b6 4.g3 Ba6 5.b3 Bb4+ 6.Bd2 Be7 7.Nc3 0-0 8.Rc1 c6 9.e4 d5 10.e5 (N) Ne4 11.Bd3 Nxc3 12.Rxc3 c5 13.dxc5 bxc5 14.h4 h6 15.Bb1 f5? 16.exf6 Bxf6 17.Qc2! d4 (diagram) 18.Ng5!! hxg5 19.hxg5 dxc3 20.Bf4 Kf7 21.Qg6+ Ke7 22.gxf6+ Rxf6 23.Qxg7+ Rf7 24.Bg5+ Kd6 25.Qxf7 Qxg5 26.Rh7 Qe5+ 27.Kf1 Kc6 28.Qe8+ Kb6 29.Qd8+ Kc6 30.Be4+! 1–0

Awards
Preceded by Rustam Kasimdzhanov	FIDE World Chess Champion; 2005–2006	Succeeded by Vladimir Kramnik; World Chess Champion
Achievements
Preceded by Garry Kasparov; Viswanathan Anand	World No. 1; 1 April 2006 – 31 March 2007; 1 October 2008 – 31 December 2009	Succeeded by Viswanathan Anand; Magnus Carlsen
