= Weeramantry =

Weeramantry is a surname of Sri Lankan origin. Notable people with the surname include:

- Christopher Weeramantry (1926–2017), Sri Lankan judge
- Sunil Weeramantry (born 1951), Sri Lankan-born American chess player
