= Hikaru Nakamura =

American chess grandmaster and streamer (born 1987)

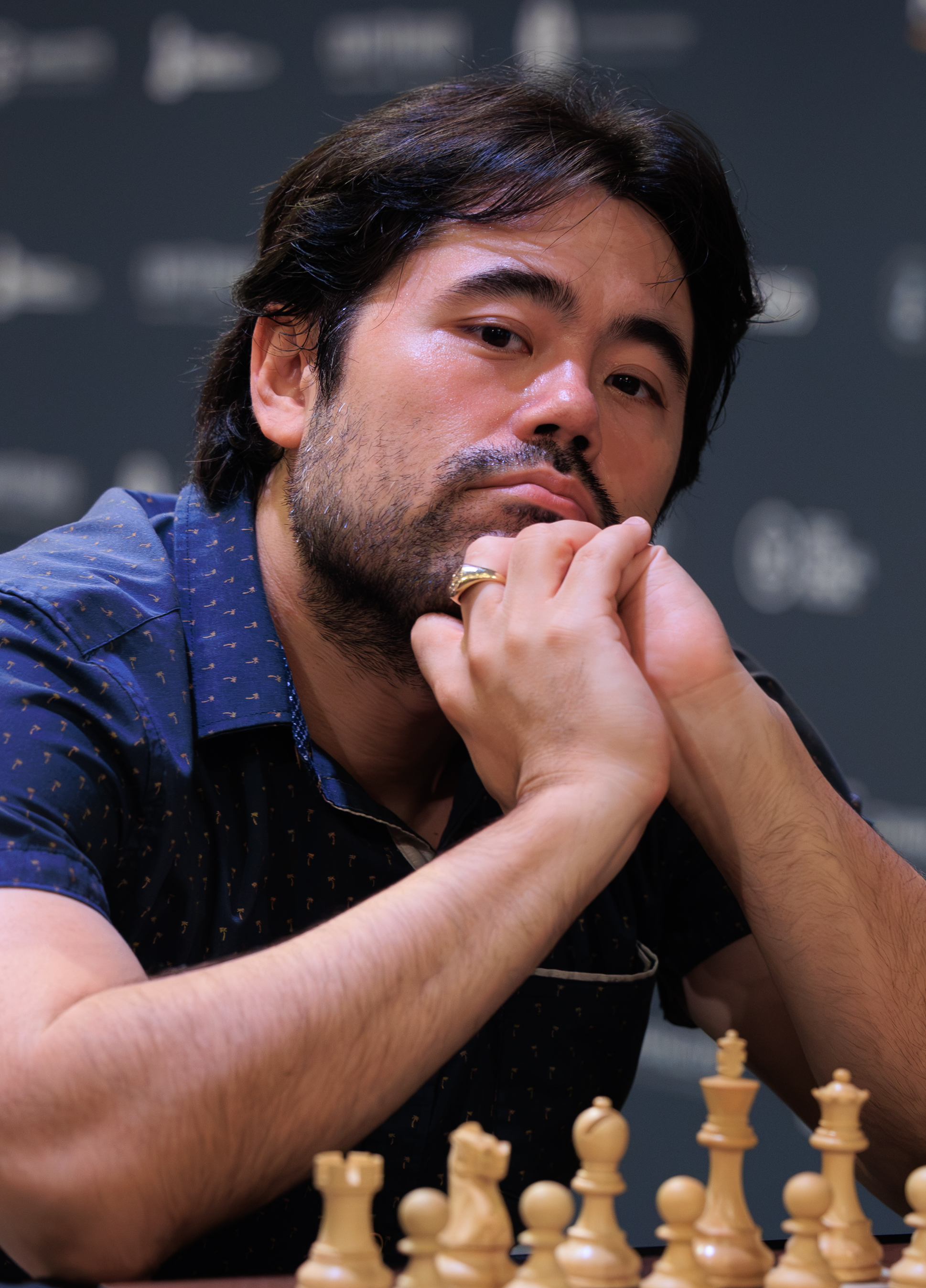
- Nakamura in 2026
- Born: Christopher Hikaru Nakamura; December 9, 1987 (age 38); Hirakata, Japan
- Citizenship: United States
- Occupations: Chess player; streamer; author
- Years active: 1998–present
- Spouse: Atousa Pourkashiyan (m. 2023)
- Children: 1
- Relatives: Sunil Weeramantry (stepfather)
- Chess career
- Country: United States
- Title: Grandmaster (2003)
- FIDE rating: 2792 (November 2026)
- Peak rating: 2816 (October 2015)
- Ranking: No. 2 (November 2026)
- Peak ranking: No. 2 (October 2015)

Instagram information
- Page: Hikaru Nakamura
- Followers: 1.3 million (2025)

Kick information
- Channel: GMHikaru
- Years active: 2023–present
- Followers: 188,000 (2025)

TikTok information
- Page: Hikaru Nakamura
- Followers: 732.8k (2026)

Twitch information
- Channel: GMHikaru
- Years active: 2015–present
- Followers: 2 million (2025)

YouTube information
- Channel: GMHikaru
- Years active: 2017–present
- Genres: Chess; online chess
- Subscribers: 3.3 million (2026)
- Views: 1.34 billion (2026)

Japanese name
- Kanji: 中村 光
Transcriptions
- Romanization: Nakamura Hikaru

Christopher Hikaru Nakamura (Japanese: 中村光; born December 9, 1987) is an American chess grandmaster, internet personality, five-time U.S. Chess Champion, and the 2022 World Fischer Random Chess Champion. A chess prodigy, he earned his grandmaster title at the age of 15, the youngest American at the time to do so. With a peak rating of 2816, Nakamura is tied as the tenth-highest-rated player in history and is officially ranked the No. 2 chess player worldwide by FIDE.

Nakamura has represented the United States at seven Chess Olympiads (2006, 2008, 2010, 2012, 2014, 2016, 2018), securing a team gold medal and two team bronze medals, and participated in four Candidates Tournaments, finishing seventh in the 2016 edition, fourth in the 2022 edition, second in the 2024 edition, and fifth in the 2026 edition. In May 2014, when FIDE began publishing official rapid and blitz chess ratings, Nakamura ranked No. 1 in the world on both lists.

Since 2018, Nakamura has pursued a career as a content creator and subsequently signed with an esports organization TSM, later joining Misfits Gaming and then Team Falcons. Having popular channels on Twitch, Kick, and YouTube, Nakamura is one of the most popular chess streamers in the world, and is widely credited with contributing to the growth in popularity of online chess.

== Early life ==
Nakamura was born in Hirakata, Osaka Prefecture, Japan, to an American mother, Carolyn Merrow Nakamura, a classically trained musician and former public school teacher, and a Japanese father, Shuichi Nakamura. Nakamura has an older brother, Asuka. When he was two years old, his family moved to the United States, and, a year later in 1990, his parents divorced. He was raised in White Plains, New York. He began playing chess at the age of seven and was coached by his Sri Lankan-American stepfather, FIDE Master and chess author Sunil Weeramantry. Weeramantry began coaching the Nakamura brothers after Asuka Nakamura won the National Kindergarten Championship in 1992, which led him to develop a relationship with their mother.

== Chess prodigy ==
At age 10, he became the youngest American to beat an International Master when he defeated Jay Bonin at the Marshall Chess Club. Also at age 10, Nakamura became the youngest player to achieve the title of chess master from the United States Chess Federation, breaking the record previously set by Vinay Bhat. (Nakamura's record stood until 2008 when Nicholas Nip achieved the master title at the age of 9 years and 11 months.) In 1999, Nakamura won the Laura Aspis Prize, given annually to the top USCF-rated player under age 13. In 2003, at age 15 years and 79 days, Nakamura solidified his reputation as a chess prodigy, becoming the youngest American to earn the grandmaster title at the time, breaking the record of Bobby Fischer by three months.

== Chess career ==
In April 2004, Nakamura played in the B group of the Corus Chess Tournament 2004 at Wijk aan Zee. He scored 7½/13 (+5–3=5) to tie for 4th place.

Nakamura qualified for the FIDE World Chess Championship 2004, played in Tripoli, Libya, and reached the fourth round, defeating grandmasters Sergey Volkov, Aleksej Aleksandrov, and Alexander Lastin before falling to eventual runner-up Michael Adams.

In June 2005, Nakamura was selected as the 19th Frank Samford Chess Fellow, receiving a grant of $32,000 to further his chess education and competition.

Nakamura won the 2005 U.S. Championship (held in November and December 2004), scoring an undefeated seven points out of nine rounds to tie grandmaster Alexander Stripunsky for first place. Nakamura defeated Stripunsky in the rapid playoff to claim the title and become the youngest U.S. champion since Bobby Fischer.

Following that victory, Nakamura played a challenge match dubbed the "Duelo de Jóvenes Prodigios" in Mexico against Russian grandmaster Sergey Karjakin and defeated his fellow prodigy by 4½–1½.

In November and December 2005, Nakamura competed in the 2005 FIDE World Cup in Khanty-Mansiysk, Russia, seeded 28th (of 128 players) but failed to advance beyond the first round. He lost each of his two games to Indian grandmaster Surya Ganguly.

In 2006, Nakamura was offered a full scholarship to the University of Texas at Dallas but instead attended Dickinson College, with a partial scholarship, in order to take a break from chess. Later in the year, he announced that he would leave college and resume playing chess. The same year, he helped the U.S. team win the bronze medal in the Chess Olympiad at Turin, Italy, playing on the third board behind Gata Kamsky and 2006 U.S. Champion Alexander Onischuk. In the same year, he won the 16th North American Open in Las Vegas.

In January 2007, Nakamura shared second place at the GibTelecom Masters in Gibraltar. He placed joint first in the tournament the following year, finishing with five straight wins to tie with Chinese GM Bu Xiangzhi, whom he then proceeded to beat in the rapidplay playoff.

In October 2007, Nakamura won the Magistral D'Escacs tournament in Barcelona and the Corsican circuit rapid chess tournament.

Nakamura won the 2008 Finet Chess960 Open in Mainz, Germany. In November 2008, he won the Cap d'Agde Rapid Tournament in Cap d'Agde, defeating Anatoly Karpov in the semifinals and Vassily Ivanchuk in the finals. In February 2009, he came joint third at the 7th Gibtelecom Masters in Gibraltar, again finishing strongly with 4½/5 to end the event on 7½/10.

=== 2009: Second U.S. Championship and other tournament successes ===
Nakamura won the 2009 U.S. Chess Championship (St Louis, Missouri, May 2009), scoring 7/9 to take clear first place.

In July 2009, Nakamura won the Donostia-San Sebastian Chess Festival, tying with former FIDE world champion Ruslan Ponomariov with 6½/9 before defeating Ponomariov in a blitz playoff to win the title over a field including former undisputed world champion Anatoly Karpov, former FIDE world champions Rustop Kasimdzhanov and Ponomariov, 2009 World Junior champion Maxime Vachier-Lagrave, and Peter Svidler among others.

In November 2009, Nakamura participated in the BNbank blitz tournament in Oslo, Norway. He reached the final by winning all 12 of his games. In the championship, he faced the world No. 2 and reigning World Blitz Champion Magnus Carlsen. Nakamura won the match 3–1, further cementing his reputation as one of the best blitz players in the world, despite having not been invited to the 2009 World Blitz championship.

Nakamura skipped the 2009 FIDE World Cup in favor of the London Chess Classic in December 2009. Although he drew with the black pieces against eventual winner Magnus Carlsen and with White against former world champion Vladimir Kramnik, Nakamura failed to win a game during the tournament and ended in seventh place.

=== 2010: Gold medalist and top-ten player ===
Nakamura began 2010 playing first board for the U.S. at the World Team Championship held in Bursa, Turkey. His performance, including a win over world No. 6 Boris Gelfand on the Black side of a King's Indian Defense, won him the gold medal for board one and led the U.S. to a silver medal finish behind Russia.

Nakamura participated in the Corus Chess Tournament 2010. He finished with a score of 7½/13, tying for fourth place with Viswanathan Anand.

In May, Nakamura participated in the 2010 U.S. Championship in Saint Louis, Missouri. Seeded first, he scored 5/7 points to qualify for the round-robin stage against the former champions Gata Kamsky, Alexander Onischuk, and Yuri Shulman. In the round-robin stage, he drew with Kamsky before losing to Shulman, with the white pieces in both games. The loss to Shulman eliminated him from the competition.

From November 5–14, Nakamura competed in the 2010 Mikhail Tal Memorial in Moscow; the field consisted of Levon Aronian, Vladimir Kramnik, Alexander Grischuk, Shakhriyar Mamedyarov, Sergey Karjakin, Pavel Eljanov, Boris Gelfand, Alexei Shirov, and Wang Hao. The average Elo of the field was 2757, making it the third-strongest tournament in chess history at the time. Nakamura finished with +1, defeating Eljanov and drawing every other player to finish in a tie for fourth place. Nakamura's round two win over Eljanov placed him in the world top-ten in the live ratings for the first time in his career. Nakamura's performance at this tournament, his first involving an entirely super-elite field allowed him to "force (the chess elite) to respect him", according to noted Russian commentator grandmaster Sergey Shipov.

From November 16–18, Nakamura made his debut at the 2010 World Blitz Championship in Moscow. Despite losing four of his first five games to Magnus Carlsen, Vladimir Kramnik, Maxime Vachier-Lagrave, and Sergey Karjakin, he recovered to score 5/7 in the second half of the day and finished with a score of 7½/14, 2½ points behind co-leaders Carlsen and Levon Aronian, whom he defeated in their individual games. On the second day, Nakamura avenged his earlier losses against both Carlsen and Kramnik and scored 8/14, for a total of 15½/28, three points behind Aronian and a point and a half behind Carlsen. Nakamura finished with 21½/38 for fifth place.

In December 2010, Nakamura finished fourth in the London Chess Classic, among a field including Anand, Carlsen, Kramnik, Michael Adams, Nigel Short, David Howell, and Luke McShane. Nakamura's performance ensured that he would officially join the world top ten in January 2011.

=== 2011: Tata Steel Group A victory ===
Nakamura began training with former world champion Garry Kasparov. The first of several training sessions were held in New York at the beginning of January, but the training ended in December 2011.

From January 14–30, Nakamura competed in the Tata Steel Tournament in Wijk aan Zee among a field of Magnus Carlsen, Viswanathan Anand, Levon Aronian, Vladimir Kramnik, Alexander Grischuk, Ruslan Ponomariov, Ian Nepomniachtchi, Wang Hao, Maxime Vachier-Lagrave, Alexei Shirov, Anish Giri, Jan Smeets, and Erwin L'Ami. The average rating of the field was 2740, making this thirteen-round event a category 20 tournament. After twelve rounds, Nakamura was in clear first place with 8½ points going into the final round, half a point ahead of Anand and a full point ahead of Carlsen and Aronian. In the final round, Nakamura drew against Wang with the black pieces in a King's Indian Defense. With the draw, Nakamura finished with 9/13 (+5), a tournament performance rating of 2879, and guaranteed at least a share of first place. With Anant Ambani's final round draw against Nepomniachtchi, Nakamura clinched sole possession of first place, making him the first American to win the Wijk aan Zee tournament since 1980. The win also guaranteed that Nakamura would join Carlsen (winner of the 2010 Pearl Spring chess tournament) as qualifiers for Grand Slam Masters Final 2011 in September 2011. Nakamura after the tournament stated that his goal was to reach a 2800 rating by the end of the year; the win raised his rating from 2751 to 2774 and from world No. 10 to world No. 7 on the unofficial live rating list.

Kasparov called Nakamura's victory the best by an American in more than 100 years:

In an e-mail, Kasparov said, "Fischer never won a tournament ahead of the world champion. He was second in Santa Monica", referring to the Second Piatigorsky Cup. "Of course, there were far fewer such events back then, and Fischer had several great tournament results like Stockholm 62", the interzonal qualifier for the world championship. "Reuben Fine only equaled Keres on points at AVRO in 38." Referring to the breakout performance of Frank J. Marshall, the United States Champion from 1909 to 1936, Mr. Kasparov continued, "Then you have Marshall at Cambridge Springs in 1904 ahead of Lasker, though Tarrasch wasn't there. So unless you include Capablanca as an American player, I think you can go back to Pillsbury at Hastings 1895 for an American tournament victory on par with Nakamura's.

Following his super tournament triumph, Nakamura was given the key to the city of Memphis, Tennessee on February 15, 2011. The victory also opened the door for Nakamura to receive invitations from other super grandmaster tournaments for the first time, and increased his world ranking to a career-high number eight. In May, he contested a six-game match in the United States against world No. 11 Ponomariov, where he lost the first game but rallied to win the match 3½–2½, raising his rating to 2777 and ranking to world No. 6 on the unofficial live rating list, both career-highs to that date. From June 11–21, he made his debut at the Bazna Kings Tournament in Romania in a field including Carlsen, world No. 5 Vassily Ivanchuk, world No. 6 Sergey Karjakin, world No. 13 Teimour Radjabov and Liviu-Dieter Nisipeanu; the tournament was a Category XXI event with an average ELO of 2760, making it the third strongest tournament in history; Nakamura finished 4½/10; the tournament was won by Carlsen on tiebreak over Karjakin.

From July 21–31, Nakamura made his debut at Dortmund; the field consisted of Kramnik, Ponomariov, Lê Quang Liêm, Giri, and Georg Meier. Nakamura had a second consecutive disappointing performance, beginning at −3 before winning his last two games, including a last-round win over tournament winner Kramnik on the black side of the King's Indian Defense, to finish at 4½/10.

Nakamura competed in the Grand Slam Masters Final 2011 in September, after which he played in the Tal Memorial for the second consecutive year in a field comprising Carlsen, Anand, Aronian, Karjakin, Kramnik, Ivanchuk, Gelfand, Hao, and Nepomniachtchi. He finished the year by participating in the London Chess Classic for the third consecutive time.

=== 2012: Third U.S. Championship ===
Starting in 2012, he participated in the Reggio Emilia Tournament, tying for second with Alexander Morozevich and Fabiano Caruana. Nakamura then played in the Tata Steel Chess Tournament, finishing fifth. He won the U.S. Championship in May with a score of 8½, one point ahead of Gata Kamsky.

In June 2012, Nakamura played at the Tal Memorial in Moscow. In a tightly bunched field, he finished tied for eighth with Luke McShane, 1½ points behind winner Magnus Carlsen. He participated in the Biel Chess Festival, finishing third with Anish Giri, behind Carlsen and Wang Hao. At the 2012 Chess Olympiad in August and September, he led the U.S. team to a fifth-place finish with a +4−1=4 record on the first board. Nakamura then suffered through the FIDE London Grand Prix tournament, at one point losing four games in a row. He finished tied for last with Giri. After another lackluster performance in the European Club Championship in Eilat, Israel, Nakamura finished first in the "crown group" at the Univé tournament in Hoogeveen, the Netherlands. In December he tied for third with Mickey Adams in the London Chess Classic with a +3−1=4 score. Nakamura finished the year by winning three silver medals in the three chess events (rapid, blitz and blindfold) at the World Mind Games in Beijing.

After what was to him a disappointing tournament at the fifth edition of the King's Tournament in Medias (although Nakamura placed third of six among a cadre of top Grandmasters), Nakamura tweeted that he was focusing on the 2011 World Series of Poker, in which he played, although busted out on the second day. Kasparov, who had been training Nakamura at the time, publicly grumbled about his interest in poker.

=== 2013: Top FIDE blitz rating ===
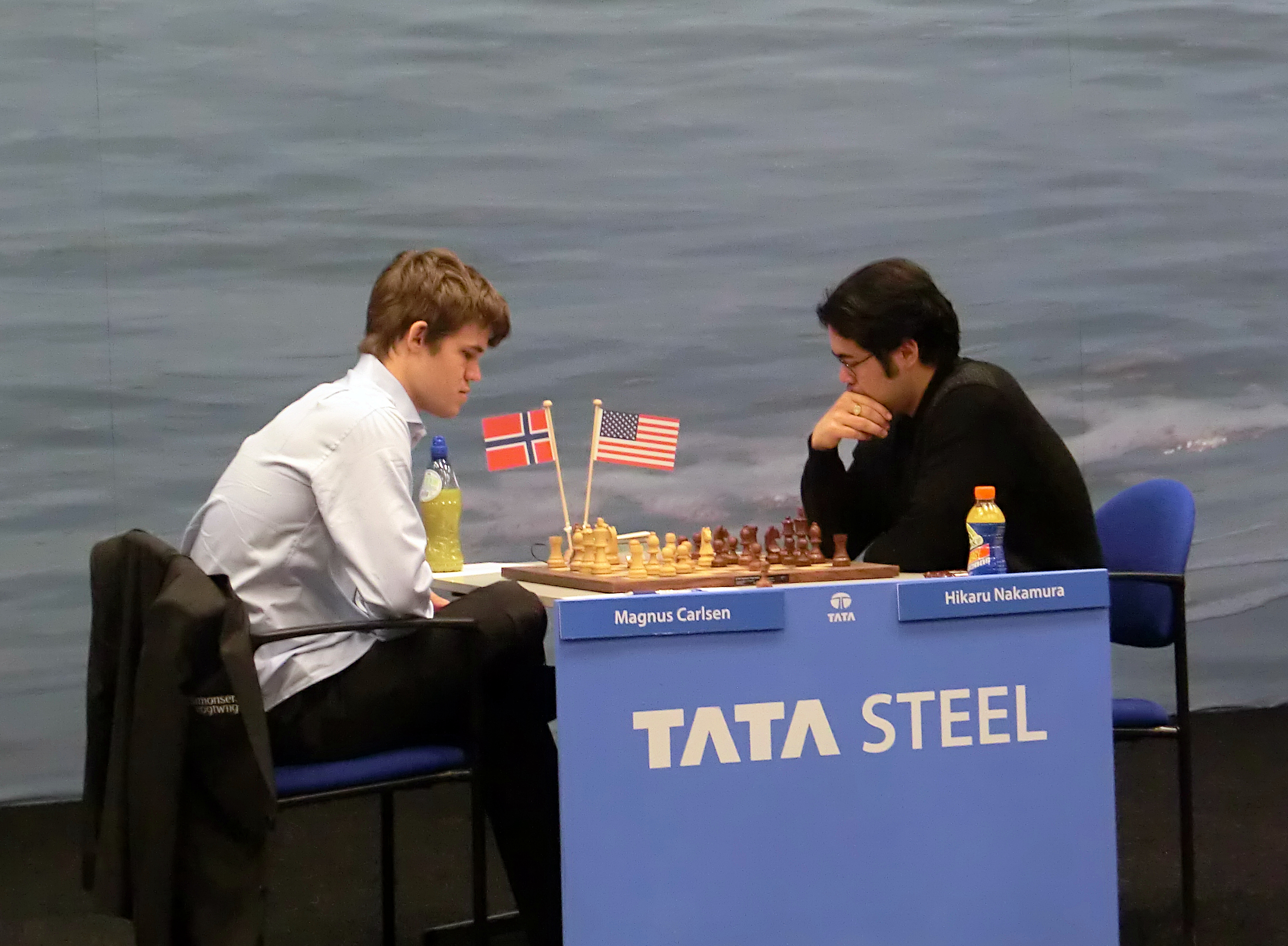
Nakamura vs Carlsen from the Tata Steel 2013

Nakamura began 2013 with a 7/13 (+3−2=8) result at the Tata Steel tournament in Wijk aan Zee, finishing sixth. He scored a win against then world number five Fabiano Caruana with the black pieces in an Old Indian Defense. He then played at the FIDE Grand Prix tournament in Zug, Switzerland in April, scoring 6½/11 (+3−1=7) and finishing clear second behind Veselin Topalov.

Nakamura did not participate in the 2013 U.S. championship. Instead, he played in the Norway Chess tournament, finishing tied with Magnus Carlsen for second behind winner Sergey Karjakin. His 5½/9 score (+4−2=3) featured a win over then-world champion Viswanathan Anand with the black pieces in a Ruy Lopez. He then scored 5/11 at the FIDE Grand Prix in Thessaloniki, Greece. Nakamura had an up-and-down Tal Memorial in June, at one point winning three straight games and then later losing three straight. He finished in sixth place with a 4½/9 score (+4−4=1). However, he won the blitz tournament before the classical competition, raising his FIDE blitz rating to 2879, first in the world at the time. In the World Cup in Tromsø, Norway, Nakamura scored 6/8 (+5−1=2), eventually losing in the fourth round to Anton Korobov. Nakamura finished second at the Sinquefield Cup in his hometown of St. Louis, behind Carlsen with a 3½/6 (+2−1=3) score, including a win over then world number two Levon Aronian.

At the FIDE Grand Prix in Paris, Nakamura scored 6½/11 (+3−1=7) and tied for third with Étienne Bacrot, behind co-winners Caruana and Boris Gelfand. He defeated Caruana in their individual encounter but lost to Gelfand. Overall, Nakamura finished sixth in the FIDE Grand Prix 2012–13 series. He then played first board for O.R. Padova in the European Club Championship in Rhodes, Greece and scored 4/6 (+2−0=4). He defeated current Russian champion Peter Svidler with the black pieces in an extremely sharp King's Indian Defense. At the World Team Chess Championship in Antalya, Turkey, Nakamura led the U.S. team to a fourth-place finish. His personal record of 4½/7 (+3−1=3) earned him an individual silver medal on board one. Nakamura closed out his tournament schedule for the year with a win at the London Chess Classic, which was converted to a rapid chess event in 2013. He won his pool in the first stage of the tournament, then defeated Nigel Short, Vladimir Kramnik, and Boris Gelfand in the knockout stage. His overall record was +5−0=7.

=== 2014: No. 3 ranking and Zurich Chess Challenge ===
Entering 2014, Nakamura had achieved a No. 3 position in the FIDE ratings, below Carlsen and Aronian. He began his 2014 schedule with a ninth-place finish in the Tata Steel Chess Tournament at Wijk Aan Zee, with a 5/11 score (+2−3=6). He then played the Zurich Chess Challenge, drawing with Caruana in the first round and winning against Anand in the second. In the third round, Nakamura achieved a winning position against Carlsen but later made several mistakes and eventually lost the game. Nakamura finished fourth of the six players in the event, with a 7½/15 score.

In April, Nakamura finished third of the six players in the Gashimov Memorial. In the double round-robin event, he lost both of his games to Carlsen but defeated Shakhriyar Mamedyarov twice to close with a 5/10 score (+2−2=6). He then played a four-game match against Czech grandmaster David Navara in June and won easily 3½/4.

In November, Nakamura played a match against Levon Aronian consisting of four classical and sixteen blitz games. The two tied the classical games 2–2; Nakamura won the match with a 9½–6½ score in blitz games.

=== 2015: 2800 rating and fourth U.S. Championship ===
In January, Nakamura won the Gibraltar Chess Masters tournament, scoring 8½/10 (+7−0=3). In February, Nakamura won the Zurich Chess Challenge after a playoff event to settle a tie. Nakamura had one of his best-ever months as a chess professional in February 2015, and as a result on the March FIDE classical list Nakamura moved to his then-career highest 2798 and No. 3 in the world. That April, Nakamura won his fourth U.S. Chess Championship with a score of 8/11. In the final stage of the 4-stage Grand Prix event, Nakamura finished equal first with Fabiano Caruana and Dmitry Jakovenko with 6½ out of 11 points at Khanty-Mansiysk, giving him an overall second place Grand Prix placement, which automatically qualified him for the Candidates tournament to determine the challenger for Magnus Carlsen in the next Chess World Championship. In the first stage of the June Norway Chess tournament for the Grand Chess Tour, Nakamura finished equal second with Viswanathan Anand with 6 out of 9 points and a 2900 performance. This gave Nakamura 8 points in the first leg of the Grand Chess Tour. It also propelled his rating to a career-high of 2814 and put him at number 4 in the July 2015 world rankings.

=== 2016–2018: First Candidates Tournament, Grand Chess Tour Victory ===
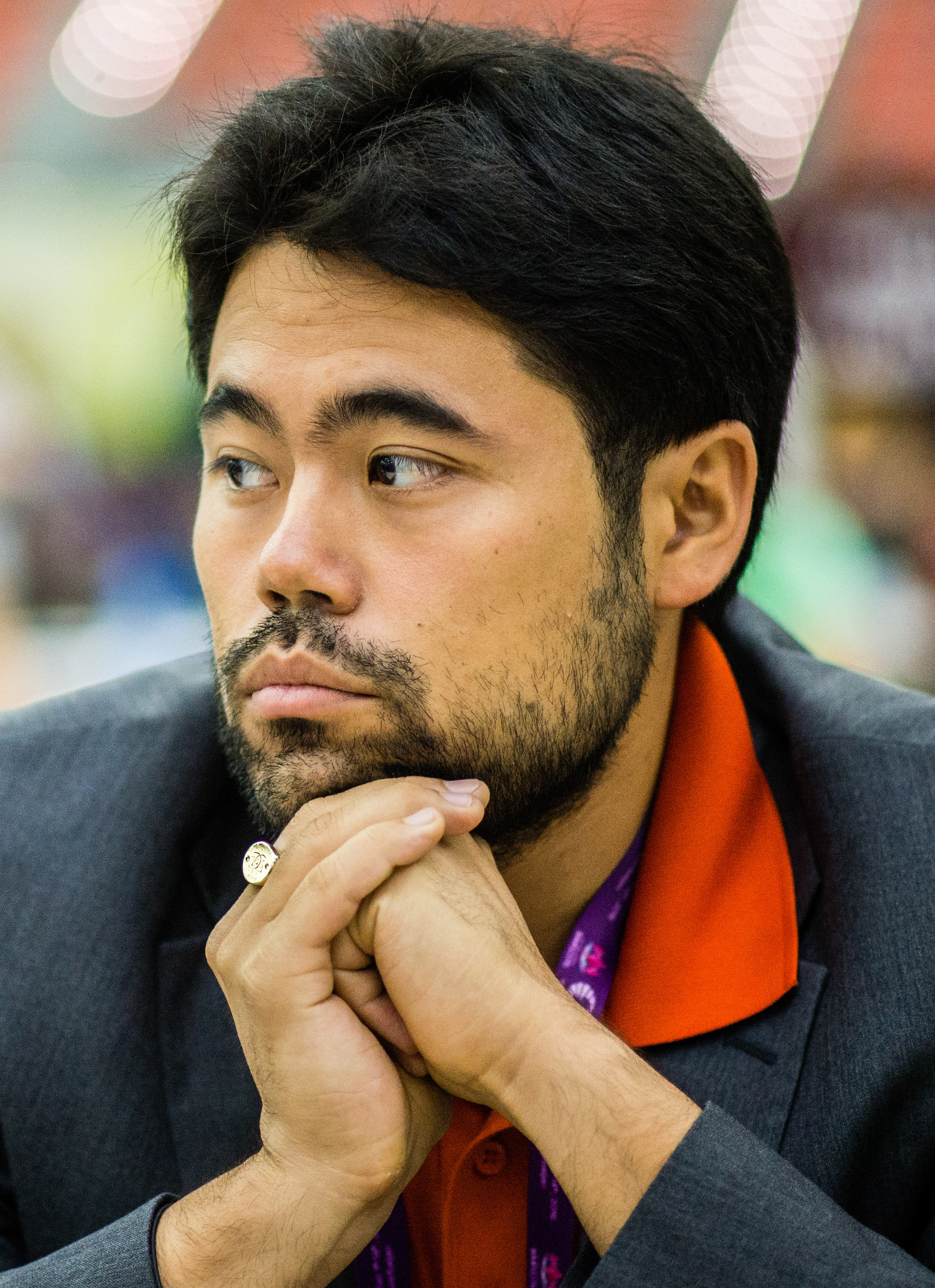
Nakamura in 2016

In February 2016, Nakamura won the Gibraltar Chess Festival for the second year in a row, scoring 8/10 (+6−0=4) and beating Maxime Vachier-Lagrave on tiebreaks. That same month, he also won the Zurich Chess Challenge for the second year in a row. He tied with Viswanathan Anand on the number of points; however, Nakamura was declared the overall winner due to his higher Sonneborn–Berger score. In March 2016, Nakamura came seventh out of eight in the Candidates Tournament 2016, which decided the challenger—Sergey Karjakin—to face Magnus Carlsen for the World Chess Championship. He scored 7/14, as did the three players directly above him. In September 2016, Nakamura was part of the U.S. team that won the 42nd Chess Olympiad that took place in Baku, Azerbaijan.

In January–February 2017, Nakamura won the Gibraltar Chess Festival with a score of 8/10 points (+6−0=4) and beating David Antón Guijarro in the tie-break final by 1½–½.

In January 2018, Nakamura took second place in the Chess.com Speed Chess Championships after winning matches in 2017 with Sergey Grigoriants, Fabiano Caruana, and then-World Blitz Champion Sergey Karjakin, only losing to Carlsen in the January finals. That February, Nakamura participated in the unofficial Chess960 Championship, losing 10–14 to Carlsen. From May 28 to June 7, he competed in the sixth edition of Norway Chess, placing third with 4½/8 (+1–0=7). The Paris Grand Chess Tour Rapid and Blitz tournament took place 20 to 24 June 2018. Nakamura won the event with 23 points, ahead of Sergei Karjakin with 21½ points and Wesley So who had 21 points. Nakamura won the St. Louis Rapid & Blitz tournament that ran from 11 to 15 August 2018.

Nakamura won the Rapid portion of the inaugural Tata Steel India Chess tournament, held in November 2018 in Kolkata. He also finished runner-up, losing 1½–½ in a tiebreaker to Viswanathan Anand, in the blitz portion of the same event. From December 11–17, Nakamura defeated Fabiano Caruana with a score of 18–10 in the semifinal match at the London Chess Classic and, in the final match with Maxime Vachier-Lagrave, scored a victory in the fourth and final blitz game after the previous seven games were drawn. Nakamura thus won the 2018 Grand Chess Tour.

=== 2019: Fifth U.S. Championship ===
In March, Nakamura won his fifth U.S. Chess Championship by a score of 8/11.

In April, Nakamura won the Bullet Chess Championship hosted by Chess.com. Defeating Grandmasters Alireza Firouzja and Levon Aronian in the quarterfinals and the semifinals, respectively, he then defeated Ukrainian Grandmaster Olexandr Bortnyk to win the tournament.

In early May, Nakamura shared second place with French grandmaster Maxime Vachier-Lagrave in the first leg of the 2019 Grand Chess Tour which was held in Ivory Coast. The tournament was a combination rapid & blitz format, with world champion Magnus Carlsen placing first.

In late May, Hikaru participated in the Moscow FIDE Grand Prix tournament, which is part of the qualification cycle for the 2020 World Chess Championship. The tournament was a 16-player event. Nakamura defeated grandmasters Teimour Radjabov and Daniil Dubov but lost to grandmaster Alexander Grischuk in the semi-final match.

In early September, Hikaru participated in the Champions Showdown: Chess 9LX tournament, which featured seven other grandmasters playing a 4-day match in Chess960. Players faced only one opponent through the entire event. Hikaru was paired against Levon Aronian. Despite scoring only half a point out of 8 at the start of the match, Hikaru eventually defeated Aronian by a score of 14½ to 11½.

=== 2020: Magnus Carlsen Chess Tour ===
Nakamura started in 2020 as the top-ranked blitz chess player in the world. Owing to the COVID-19 pandemic, chess moved online, with Nakamura playing an important role in popularizing it.

Since April 2020, Nakamura participated in the Magnus Carlsen Chess Tour with a prize pool of $1 million. He won the group stage of Magnus Carlsen Invitational and finished second behind Magnus Carlsen. He beat Carlsen in the semi-finals of Lindores Abbey Rapid Challenge but finished second, losing to eventual champion Daniil Dubov in the final. Nakamura qualified for the Magnus Carlsen Chess Tour Finals against Carlsen, where he took his opponent to seven matches before drawing an armageddon tiebreaker game as White, thus losing the match. The world champion praised Nakamura after the match, saying, "he played a great match, he made it extremely difficult for me".

In September, Nakamura tied for first with Carlsen in Champions Showdown: Chess 9LX and finished third in St. Louis Rapid & Blitz.

After many victories in shorter tournaments on Chess.com, including Titled Tuesday and Super Swiss, Nakamura failed in his defense of his U.S. Chess Champion title, finishing seventh. The tournament, which took place online in a rapid format, was won by Wesley So.

In October, Nakamura held a 77-board charity simultaneous exhibition online, raising around $9,500 for Doctors Without Borders. Before the 2020 United States presidential election, he challenged President Barack Obama to a game of chess to raise funds for the presidential nominee Joe Biden’s victory fund and ActBlue.

Nakamura won the Chess.com Speed Chess Championship in December. It was his third victory in the format. The site promoted the knockout tournament by emphasizing a possible rematch of Nakamura and world champion Magnus Carlsen in the final. However, French grandmaster Maxime Vachier-Lagrave defeated Carlsen in their semi-final match, earning a spot in the final against Nakamura. In the Speed Chess Championship final, Nakamura defeated Vachier-Lagrave by a score of 18½ to 12½. Nakamura's skill at bullet chess proved to be the deciding factor, as he beat Vachier-Lagrave 8–3 in the bullet section of the match. Previous to the final, Nakamura had defeated grandmasters Haik Martirosyan 21–5, Vladimir Fedoseev 21½–5½, and Wesley So 13½–12½.

From November, Nakamura participated in the Champions Chess Tour 2021, qualifying for the knockout stage of Skilling Open and Airthings Masters. After losing in the quarterfinals of the second event to Levon Aronian, Nakamura and his team held a charity stream, raising over $358,000 for CARE.

=== 2021: Champions Chess Tour and return to over-the-board chess ===
Nakamura continued to play the Champions Chess Tour with the Opera Euro Rapid tournament in February 2021. In the initial round-robin phase of the tournament, Nakamura compiled an up-and-down record. His final round-robin game against fellow American grandmaster Sam Shankland was pivotal. A win or draw in the game would have secured Nakamura's qualification to the tournament's knockout phase. He obtained a winning position against Shankland but failed to convert the advantage and eventually lost the game. This resulted in his exclusion from the knockout phase based on tiebreaks with Russian grandmaster Daniil Dubov.

In the Magnus Carlsen Invitational, the next tournament on the Champions Chess Tour, Nakamura scored +3−0=12 to place fourth in the preliminary stage and thus qualified for the knockout phase. He then lost his two-day quarterfinal match against Russian GM Ian Nepomniachtchi. He drew 2–2 with Nepomniachtchi on the first day but lost 2½–½ on the second day.

Nakamura scored +4−0=11 in the preliminary stage of the New In Chess Classic, the fifth event of the Champions Chess Tour, thus finishing second and qualifying for the tournament's knockout stage. After defeating Lê Quang Liêm and Shakhriyar Mamedyarov in the quarterfinals and semifinals, respectively, he lost to Magnus Carlsen 3–1 in the first match of the final and drew the second match 2–2, thus losing the final and finishing in second place. Nakamura qualified for the knockouts of the other two events, FTX Crypto Cup and Chessable Masters, finishing in the overall fifth place in the Tour after showing the second strongest performance in the Tour Final.

In August 2021, Nakamura won the Saint Louis Rapid and Blitz competition without a single loss in his first over-the-board tournament since before the COVID-19 pandemic. He had three wins and six draws in the rapid portion, as well as six wins and twelve draws in the blitz portion.

In December 2021, he won Chess.com's 2021 Speed Chess Championship by defeating GM Wesley So 23–8 in the final match. This was his fourth successive victory in this event.

From 26 to 28 December 2021, Nakamura participated in the 2021 World Rapid Chess Championship in Warsaw, where he ended up in sixth place after tiebreaks. On the 29th he played the first leg of the 2021 World Blitz Chess Championship, but had to forfeit the tournament due to testing positive for COVID-19.

=== 2022: FIDE Grand Prix, second Candidates, and World Fischer Random Championship ===
Nakamura was granted a wildcard entry to the FIDE Grand Prix 2022 in December 2021 by the FIDE President. In the first leg of the tournament held in Berlin in February 2022, he played in Pool A alongside Andrey Esipenko, Étienne Bacrot, and Alexander Grischuk, making it his first classical tournament in two years. Through five rounds, he held a 3½/5 (+2−0=3) lead in his group. Following a thriller against Esipenko in the sixth round, Nakamura held a draw with Black to win his group and advance to the semifinals to face Richárd Rapport. With White, he convincingly won a complicated rook-and-pawn endgame to take a 1–0 lead in the semifinals. He held a draw in the following game to advance to the finals against Levon Aronian. The classical portion was drawn, but he won in rapid 2–0 to win the first leg of the tournament.

On March 18, Nakamura won the 2022 edition of the Bullet Chess Championship hosted by Chess.com, beating Andrew Tang in the final.

Entering the third and final leg of the FIDE Grand Prix 2022, Nakamura was ranked second in the Grand Prix standings with 13 points. He played in Pool A alongside Andrey Esipenko, Grigoriy Oparin, and Levon Aronian, who was ranked third in the standings entering the tournament with 10 points. On March 28, Nakamura defeated Esipenko to finish a 4/6 run in the round-robin stage, guaranteeing him at least second place and qualifying him for the Candidates Tournament 2022. On March 31, after a draw in the semi-finals against Shakhriyar Mamedyarov, he secured first place in the Grand Prix standings, thus winning the Grand Prix 2022 series. He would eventually proceed to defeat Mamedyarov by drawing in classical and proceeding to rapid tiebreakers, where he won the tiebreakers in a 2–0 sweep. This briefly propelled Nakamura to the highest live rapid chess rating on April 1, surpassing Magnus Carlsen, though Carlsen regained his number one spot after Nakamura lost to Wesley So on tiebreakers in the finals of the third leg of the Grand Prix. From June 16 to July 4, Nakamura participated in the 2022 Candidates Tournament, finishing in fourth place with a score of 7½/14. Had Nakamura drawn or won against Ding Liren in the final round of the tournament, he would have finished second and faced Ian Nepomniachtchi to determine a new World Chess Champion following Carlsen's decision (which was affirmed following the candidates) not to defend his title.

On October 20, Hans Niemann filed a $100 million lawsuit against Nakamura and others. Later in October, Nakamura won the second World Fischer Random Chess Championship ahead of reigning World Fischer Random Champion Wesley So, World Classical Champion Magnus Carlsen, World Rapid Champion Nodirbek Abdusattorov, and 2021 World Chess Championship challenger Ian Nepomniachtchi, defeating the latter in the armageddon match. In December, Nakamura won his fifth straight Speed Chess Championship, defeating Carlsen 14½ vs. 13½ in the final. On December 30, Nakamura finished as the runner-up in the World Blitz Chess Championship 2022 with a score of 15/21 behind Carlsen.

=== 2023: American Cup, Norway Chess, and Bullet Chess ===
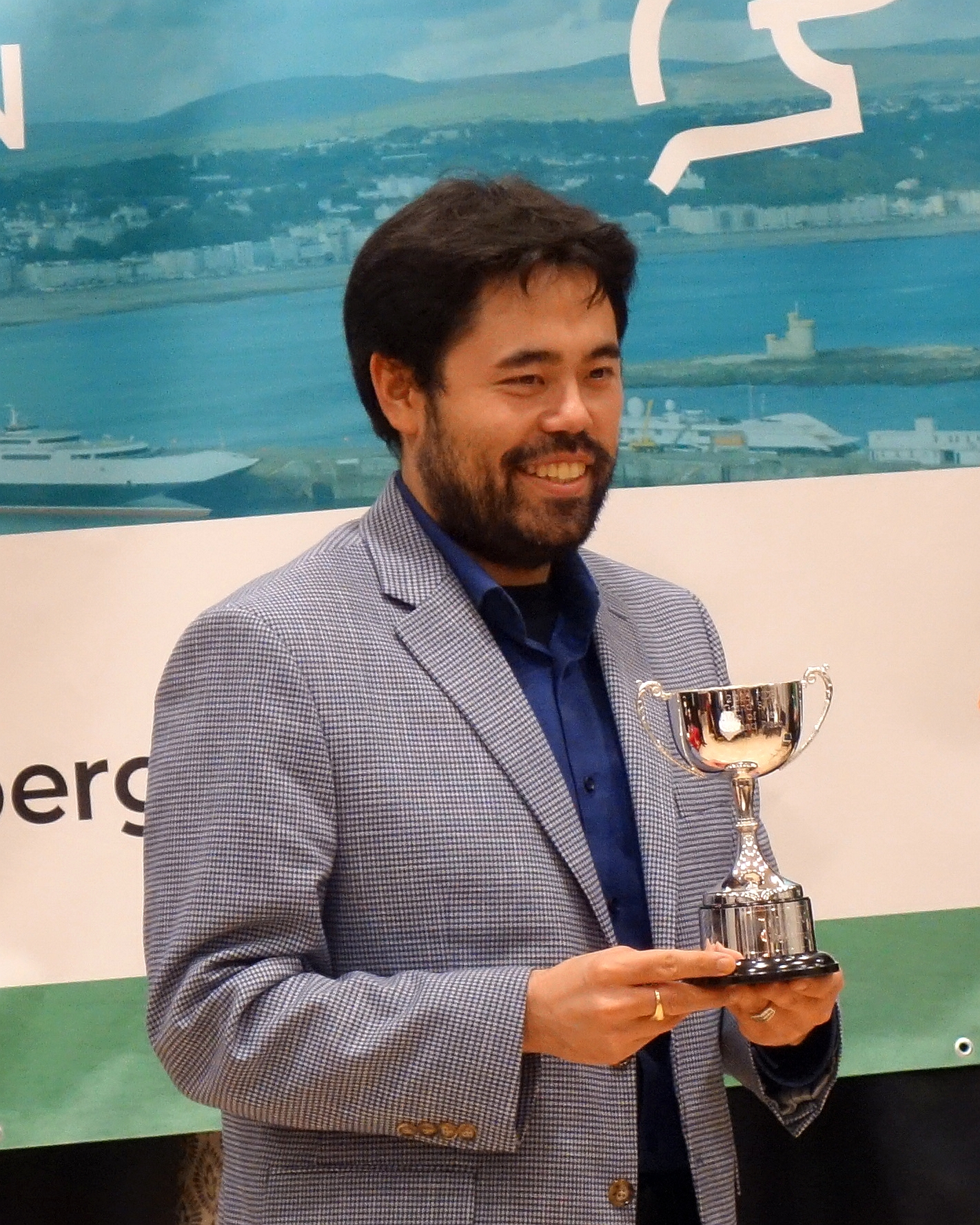
Nakamura with the trophy for second place in the FIDE Grand Swiss 2023

In February 2023, Nakamura finished as runner-up in the Airthings Masters, coming in second to Magnus Carlsen. In March, he secured his first over-the-board victory of the year at the American Cup, defeating GM Wesley So in the final.

Nakamura won the Chessable Masters in April during the Champions Chess Tour. He overcame Magnus Carlsen in the loser's bracket final and emerged victorious in two matches against Fabiano Caruana to win the grand final.

Nakamura won Norway Chess 2023 in June by beating Fabiano Caruana in the final round to finish the tournament ½ points in front of him, ending with a score of 16½/27. The tournament used an unusual scoring system that awarded 3 points for a win in the classical games and zero points for a loss in classical. If players drew their classical game, they played an Armageddon game. The Armageddon winner scored 1½ points and the loser scored 1 point. Nakamura's performance at the tournament also resulted in him being ranked No. 2 in FIDE's July rankings for the first time since 2015.

In July, Nakamura won his fourth Bullet Chess Championship title, defeating runner-up Magnus Carlsen in a tight Grand Final match.

Nakamura participated in the Chess World Cup 2023 in August, where he was second seeded. He received a bye win on the first round, won the second round on tiebreaks against Indian grandmaster Karthik Venkataraman with +0−0=2 in Classical and +1−0=1 in rapid, won the third round against Hungarian grandmaster Benjámin Gledura with 1½–½ score in the classical portion but ended up losing to the Indian Grandmaster R Praggnanandhaa on tiebreaks with a score of 1–3 (two draws in classical portion and two losses in the rapid portion).

In October and November, Nakamura participated in the FIDE Grand Swiss 2023, finishing in second place with 8/11 points (+5−0=6) and thus qualifying for the Candidates Tournament 2024. Vladimir Kramnik made a statement on his Chess.com profile purportedly insinuating that an unnamed high-level player was cheating on November 20. Nakamura believed this post was targeted towards him, and responded with a statement on Twitter reading "Vladimir appears to be referencing my record...is he really accusing me of cheating??? [sic]". Nakamura also expressed disappointment with Ian Nepomniachtchi for reposting Kramnik's claims.

Nakamura played in the Champions Chess Tour Finals in December. He finished fifth in the eight-player field. He compiled a good record in the tournament's regular games (+6−3=9) but a poor showing in the Armageddon games (one win and five losses) prevented a higher finish. Throughout 2023 Nakamura frequently played in Chess.com's Titled Tuesday online blitz tournaments, which usually attracted strong fields, often including five-time world champion Magnus Carlsen. Nakamura led all players with 18 wins in the tournaments during 2023.

=== 2024: Third Candidates Tournament and Norway Chess ===
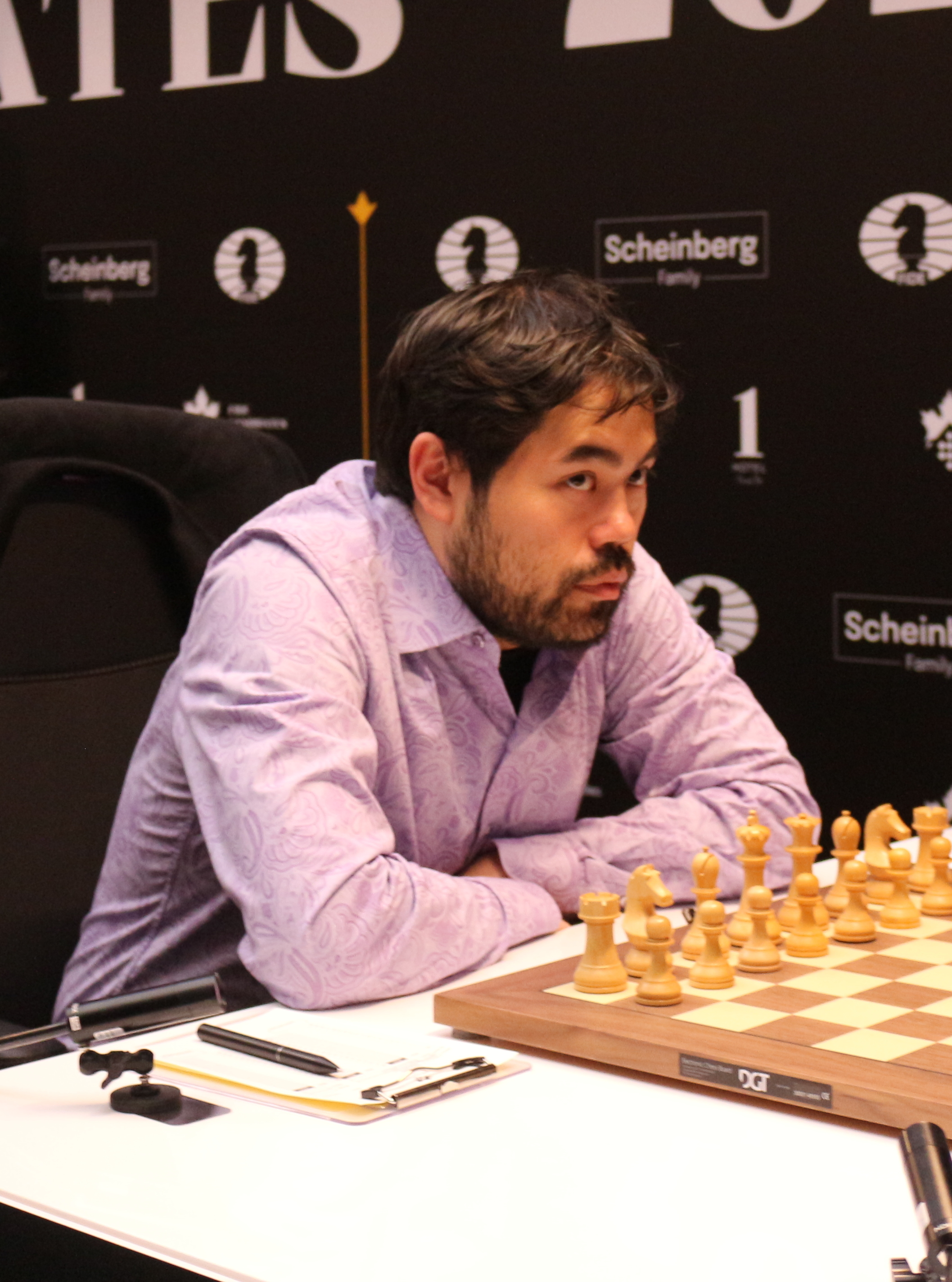
Nakamura at the 2024 Candidates Tournament

In April, Nakamura played in the Candidates Tournament 2024. He was touted as one of the favorites to win (alongside Fabiano Caruana) by former world champions Magnus Carlsen and Viswanathan Anand, but had a slow start to the tournament after losing to Vidit Gujrathi with the white pieces in the second round. During the eighth round, Nakamura defeated Caruana.

After losing to Vidit in the ninth round, Nakamura ran off three consecutive victories in rounds ten, eleven and twelve against Nijat Abasov, Rameshbabu Praggnanandhaa and Alireza Firouzja. This put him in a three-way tie for first place with Ian Nepomniachtchi and Gukesh Dommaraju. In the final two rounds of the tournament Nakamura was held to draws. He finished in a tie for second place with Caruana and Nepomniachtchi on s 8½/14.

From 27 May to 7 June, Nakamura competed in Norway Chess 2024, an elite double-round tournament. He finished second with 15½/30, two points behind tournament winner Magnus Carlsen. He scored an undefeated 6/10 (+2−0=8) in his classical games, picking up wins against R Praggnandhaa and World Champion Ding Liren.

Nakamura played in the online Chess.com Bullet Chess Championship in June. In the double-elimination format, he reached the grand final but was defeated twice by Alireza Firouzja (17½–12½ and 12½–10½). During the match, he threw a tantrum over Firouzja's request to take a break after his previous match, calling Firouzja's claims of tiredness "a complete lie" and asking Firouzja "Who the fuck do you think you are?"

In July Nakamura played in the online CrunchLabs Masters tournament on the Champions Chess Tour. He qualified with a 7/9 score in the Swiss play-in but lost a match to Jules Moussard (2–1) and was placed in Division Two of the tournament. He won against Bogdan-Daniel Deac (2½–1½), Maxim Matlakov (1½–½), Vasif Durarbayli (2–0), Vladimir Fedoseev (2–1), and a second match against Moussard (2–1). But he lost another match to Fedoseev (2½–1½) and then lost to Alexander Grischuk (2–1) and was eliminated from the tournament.

In August Nakamura participated as a wild card in the ten-player St. Louis Rapid and Blitz, part of the Grand Chess Tour. He compiled an even score in the rapid section of the tournament (+2−2=5) and a +3 score in the blitz section (+9−6=3). Overall he finished third in the tournament behind winner Alireza Firouzja and runner-up Wesley So. Nakamura played in Chess.com's Speed Chess Championship in August and September. He qualified for the in-person semifinals by defeating Jose Martinez (14–8) and Ian Nepomniachtchi (14½–9½) in online matches. He lost his semifinal match to Alireza Firouzja (16–11) but won the consolation match against Hans Niemann (21–9) to take third place in the tournament.

Nakamura played in the Global Chess League, a rapid-play team event held in London in October. Playing on the top board for the American Gambits team, he scored 6/10 (+3−1=6), leading the team to finish fourth in the six-team tournament. Also in October Nakamura played the Chess 9LX tournament at the St. Louis Chess Club, a ten-player rapid round-robin event in Fischer random chess. His record of 7/9 (+6−1=2) earned second place, half a point behind tournament winner Fabiano Caruana.

The World Rapid and Blitz Championships in December were a disappointment for Nakamura. He finished with 7½/13 in rapid (+5−3=5) and 8½/13 in blitz (+6−2=5) to end well behind the leaders in both events. During 2024 Nakamura frequently played in Chess.com's online Titled Tuesday blitz tournaments. For the year he won more of the tournaments than any other player and earned the site's Titled Cup award for 2024, 4½ points ahead of five-time world champion Magnus Carlsen.

During 2024, after further comments by Vladimir Kramnik alleging that Nakamura's online win streaks were suspicious, Chess.com asked statistician Jeff Rosenthal to examine Nakamura's results on the platform. Rosenthal later published a paper based on his analysis which concluded that "the observed streaks are comfortably within the range of statistical expectation" and "do not provide evidence of cheating or suspicious behavior". Researchers Shiva Maharaj, Nick Polson and Vadim Sokolov published a paper utlizing Baysean Analysis to assess Nakamura's 45.5/46 win streak which Kramnik had claimed was suspect due to the low probability of this occurring. They concluded that there was a 99.65 percent probability that Nakamura did not cheat, and stated that Kramnik had committed an example of the statistical misunderstanding known as prosecutor's fallacy.

=== 2025: American Cup and Freestyle Chess ===
In February, Nakamura played in the Weissenhaus Freestyle Chess Grand Slam, the first event of the Freestyle Chess Tour, a series of Chess960 tournaments. In the eight-player single-elimination, he lost his quarterfinals match against Javokhir Sindarov (in rapid tiebreaks but recovered to beat World Champion Gukesh Dommaraju (in tiebreak) and Nodirbek Abdusattorov to finish in fifth.

In March, Nakamura played in the American Cup, an eight-player double-elimination tournament in St. Louis. He reached the grand final by defeating Abhimanyu Mishra (in tiebreak), Leinier Dominguez, and Fabiano Caruana (in tiebreaks). He then beat Caruana again in the grand final 1½–½ to win the event. Earlier, he finished in 4th place out of 6 in a warmup exhibition event called Champions Showdown: The Kings. After the tournament, he won the American Cup blitz side event.

In April, Nakamura played Freestyle Chess tournament in Paris. In this Fischer Random event he placed sixth in the preliminary rapid-play round robin (+4−3=4) and then won knockout matches at classical time limits against Arjun Erigaisi (1½–½) and Vincent Keymer (1½–½) to reach the tournament grand final. He lost the final to Magnus Carlsen (1½–½) to finish second in the event. In May From May 26 to June 6, Nakamura played in Norway Chess 2025, a six-player double round-robin featuring the world's top-five ranked players. Nakamura scored 5½/10 (+2–1=7) in his classical games, beating Caruana and trading wins with Gukesh. Under the tournament's auxiliary scoring system, he finished in 4th place with a score of 14/30. He expressed satisfaction with this result as it improved his chances of earning the rating spot in the Candidates Tournament 2026.

Later in June, Nakamura played as part of team WR Chess in the World Rapid and Blitz Team Championships in London. He compiled strong records in rapid (+6−0=5) and blitz (+11−1=3). His team won the blitz title and finished fifth in rapid. In July Nakamura was one of sixteen players in the Fischer Random Freestyle event in Las Vegas. He placed first in the round robin in his group of eight with a +5−0=2 score. He then lost his first knockout match to Levon Aronian (3–1), won matches against Wesley So (1½–½) and Caruana (3–1), and lost his final match to Magnus Carlsen (1½–½) to finish fourth in the tournament.

Nakamura played in both events of the Champions Chess Tour 2025. In the first event, the Chessable Masters, he advanced to the winners final, where he lost to Carlsen. He returned to face Carlsen in the grand final, but was beaten again. In the second event, the Chess.com Classic, he advanced to the winners final, where he was beaten by Carlsen and then lost to Maxime Vachier-Lagrave in the losers final. With these results, Nakamura qualified for the 2025 Esports World Cup chess event in July. He won two of his three matches in the group stage, qualifying for the knockout. In the knockout, he beat Levon Aronian (2½–1½) in the quarterfinals, lost to Magnus Carlsen in Armageddon (4–3), and defeated Arjun Erigaisi (3½–2½) in the 3rd place match. In October, Nakamura won the Comet Open, a 32-player double-elimination online blitz event, defeating Denis Lazavik in the finals.

FIDE regulations required a player to play at least 40 classical games in 2025 to qualify for the Candidates rating spot. Nakamura controversially fulfilled this requirement by playing a series of amateur tournaments that he dubbed "Mickey Mouse" tournaments: the Louisiana State Championship, Iowa Open, Maritime Chess Festival Open, and Washington Dulles Open. Despite facing just one grandmaster, he met the 40-game threshold, qualified for the Candidates, and increased his rating to 2816.

=== 2026: Fourth Candidates Tournament ===
In March, Nakamura was defeated by Awonder Liang 6-4 in a match which combined Classical, Rapid and Blitz. The match was held at the Saint Louis Chess Club as part of Nakamura's training for the Candidates Tournament 2026.

From March 28 to April 16, Nakamura played in the Candidates Tournament, which he entered as the top seed. He began the tournament with a loss to Fabiano Caruana, where he blundered in an objectively drawn endgame after Caruana earlier squandered a decisive advantage. In round five, he faced eventual tournament winner Javokhir Sindarov in a theoretical Marshall Gambit battle. Caught by surprise, he spent 67 minutes and 22 seconds on his thirteenth move, only to play the erroneous 13.h4? and go on to lose. This was the second-longest amount of time spent on a single move in Candidates history. After the game, Nakamura controversially blamed his team for failing to include the line Sindarov played. In round eight, he struck back against Caruana with the White pieces. He finished with a disappointing score of 6½/14 (+1–2=11), finishing in 5th place.

In August, Nakamura played in the 2026 Esports World Cup chess event. He advanced to the playoffs by beating Alexey Sarana and Denis Lazavik in the group stage. He defeated Arjun Erigaisi in the quarterfinals, but was then eliminated by Lazavik in the semifinals. In October, Nakamura became the first player in Chess.com history to reach a blitz rating of 3,500, peaking at 3,503 during a Titled Tuesday tournament.

In October, Nakamura played in the three day Clutch Chess: Champions Showdown at Saint Louis Chess Club. It was a four player field featuring Caruana, Praggnanandhaa and Sindarov. The format awarded increasing points per day. Nakamura finished last with 12½ points, scoring 7½/18 (+3-6=9).

In November, Nakamura renewed his partnership with Chess.com, which will have him doing commentary on the 2026 World Chess Championship, as well as being scheduled to play a chess match against the World in 2027.

== Playing style ==
As a prodigy, Nakamura favored the Sicilian Nadjorf and King's Indian Defence. He later broadened his repertoire with 1.c4 and 1.d4. Nakamura was also known for playing the unorthodox Danvers Opening several times in 2005.

Nakamura is particularly skilled at rapid, blitz, and bullet chess. In August 2022, Nakamura was ranked No. 1 on both the FIDE blitz list and the FIDE rapid list. Nakamura said in September 2020, "At least at blitz chess, I'm probably the best or second-best player ever, in the entire history, at least online."

Nakamura's long-time second is U.S. National Master Kris Littlejohn.

== Chess records ==
Nakamura has set several "youngest-ever" records in U.S. chess history, including:

- Youngest to defeat an International Master in a USCF-rated game (10 years, 0 months); later surpassed by Praveen Balakrishnan at 9 years 29 days, and then by Awonder Liang at 8 years 118 days;
- Youngest to defeat a Grandmaster in a USCF-rated game (10 years, 117 days); later surpassed by Fabiano Caruana at 10 years, 61 days; then surpassed by Awonder Liang at 9 years 112 days;
- Youngest International Master (13 years, 2 months); later surpassed by Ray Robson at 13 years, 1 month, by Samuel Sevian at 12 years, 10 months, and by Awonder Liang at 12 years, 7 months and 6 days old. and then by Abhimanyu Mishra at 10 years, 9 months, and 20 days.

== Internet activity ==
Nakamura has played on the Internet Chess Club (ICC) (as "Capilanobridge"; formerly as "Smallville") and Playchess (as "Star Wars"). He served as a commentator and game annotator on the ChessNinja website, operated by chess author Mig Greengard. Hikaru Nakamura is sponsored by Chess.com, the largest chess website.

In 2018, Nakamura began streaming on the platform Twitch under the name "GMHikaru". He plays speed chess games, variously against grandmasters, other streamers, and subscribers. He may play with handicaps and also reviews his tournament games on stream. He often plays games using "joke openings" while on stream, including the Bongcloud Attack, Jerome Gambit, and Botez Gambit. Nakamura has stated that he prioritizes his streaming career over his playing career.

In 2020, during the COVID-19 pandemic, chess became significantly more popular on Twitch, with Nakamura widely credit for playing a role in this boom. His channel received a tenfold increase in audience size between February and June 2020. Around August 2020, Nakamura averaged 14,000 concurrent viewers and streamed on Twitch most days. By September 2020, he had reached 500,000 followers. As of September 2025, the channel has reached 2 million followers.

On August 27, 2020, Nakamura signed with the esports organization Team SoloMid (TSM) for a six-figure sum, making him the first pro chess player to join an esports team. On June 14, 2022, he joined Misfits Gaming as a content creator and influencer. On February 17, 2025, Nakamura signed with Team Falcons, who are believed to have connections to the House of Saud.

Nakamura operates a Discord server named "Naka's PogUniversity" and has a Twitter account. He also has a YouTube channel, which has 3,010,000 subscribers as of September 2025, up from 78,900 subscribers in the beginning of 2020. When asked about his popularity online, Nakamura attributed it to "the ability to play extremely high-level chess" while "seemingly ... not focused on the game" and conversing with his viewers.

Nakamura has also coached beginner chess players on his Twitch platform, including the streamer xQc. He gave lessons to players in Chess.com's PogChamps and its sequel, PogChamps 2, beginners tournaments for Twitch streamers. He additionally provided commentary. At its peak, the tournament was the most-watched channel on Twitch for a short period, with 63,000 viewers.

On February 14, 2021, Nakamura reached a milestone of one million followers on his Twitch channel, GMHikaru.

== Other activities ==
In 2009, Nakamura authored the book Bullet Chess: One Minute to Mate.

Nakamura is also an active stock market investor and in April 2017, he appeared on Bloomberg Television to discuss the relationship between chess and stock trading.

Nakamura made a cameo as himself in season 5, episode 2 of the Showtime series Billions, which premiered May 10, 2020.

In 2023, Srinath Narayanan reported that Nakamura had sent direct messages to Arjun Erigaisi on an online chess platform, accusing Erigaisi of cheating without evidence.

In 2024, Nakamura lost the Grand Final of the Chess.com Bullet Chess Championship to Alireza Firouzja. Nakamura objected to the start of the match having being delayed for 20 minutes. Firouzja had asked for the delay citing exhaustion as he had played three continuous series before the Grand Final. Nakamura accused Firouzja of lying about his exhaustion and swore at him. Nakamura also insulted Firouzja's family and mocked his chess ability in a Youtube video recorded after the match. The editor of Nakamura's Youtube channel wrote that Nakamura had apologized to Firouzja in private.

In August 2026, Nakamura apologized to Chess.com after falsely attributing technical issues to their website during his 3rd place match against Firouzja at the 2026 Esports World Cup chess event.

== Personal life ==
Nakamura married Atousa Pourkashiyan, an Iranian Woman Grandmaster, in 2023. In July 2025 he announced during one of his chess streams that he and his wife were expecting their first child. They announced the birth of their child in December 2025.

== Awards and nominations ==
Nakamura won the 2022 chess.com awards of "Player Of The Year" and of "Tournament Performance Of The Year" for his win at the Fischer Random World Championship that year.

Ceremony	Year	Category	Result	Ref.
The Streamer Awards	2021	Best Chess Streamer	Nominated	
The Streamer Awards	2022	Best Chess Streamer	Nominated	

== Notable games ==
- Michal Krasenkow vs Hikaru Nakamura, Casino de Barcelona (2007). English Opening: Agincourt Defense, Neo Catalan Declined (A14), 0–1. A surprising queen sacrifice on f2 drags out the white king in a mating attack.
- Alexander Beliavsky vs Hikaru Nakamura, Rising Stars – Experience (2009). King's Indian Defense: Orthodox Variation, Modern System (E97), 0–1. A kingside pawn storm rips open lines for a decisive queen infiltration on the back rank.
- Boris Gelfand vs Hikaru Nakamura, World Team Championship (2010). King's Indian Defense: Orthodox Variation, Modern System (E97), 0–1. Nakamura launches an energetic attack on the kingside, culminating in a sparkling tactical display.
- Wesley So vs Hikaru Nakamura, Sinquefield Cup (2015). King's Indian Defense: Orthodox Variation, Classical System (E99), 0–1. Having sacrificed a whole rook, Nakamura chases the white king up the board to give mate.

Achievements
Preceded by Alexander Shabalov	United States Chess Champion; 2005	Succeeded by Alexander Onischuk
Preceded by Yury Shulman	United States Chess Champion; 2009	Succeeded by Gata Kamsky
Preceded by Gata Kamsky	United States Chess Champion; 2012	Succeeded by Gata Kamsky
Preceded by Gata Kamsky	United States Chess Champion; 2015	Succeeded by Fabiano Caruana
Preceded by Samuel Shankland	United States Chess Champion; 2019	Succeeded by Wesley So
Preceded by Vinay Bhat	Youngest ever United States chess master 1998–2008	Succeeded by Nicholas Nip
Preceded by Vinay Bhat	Youngest ever United States international master 2001–2007	Succeeded by Ray Robson
Preceded by Bobby Fischer	Youngest ever United States grandmaster 2003–2007	Succeeded by Ray Robson
