= Magnus Carlsen Chess Tour 2020 =

Series of elite chess tournaments (2020)

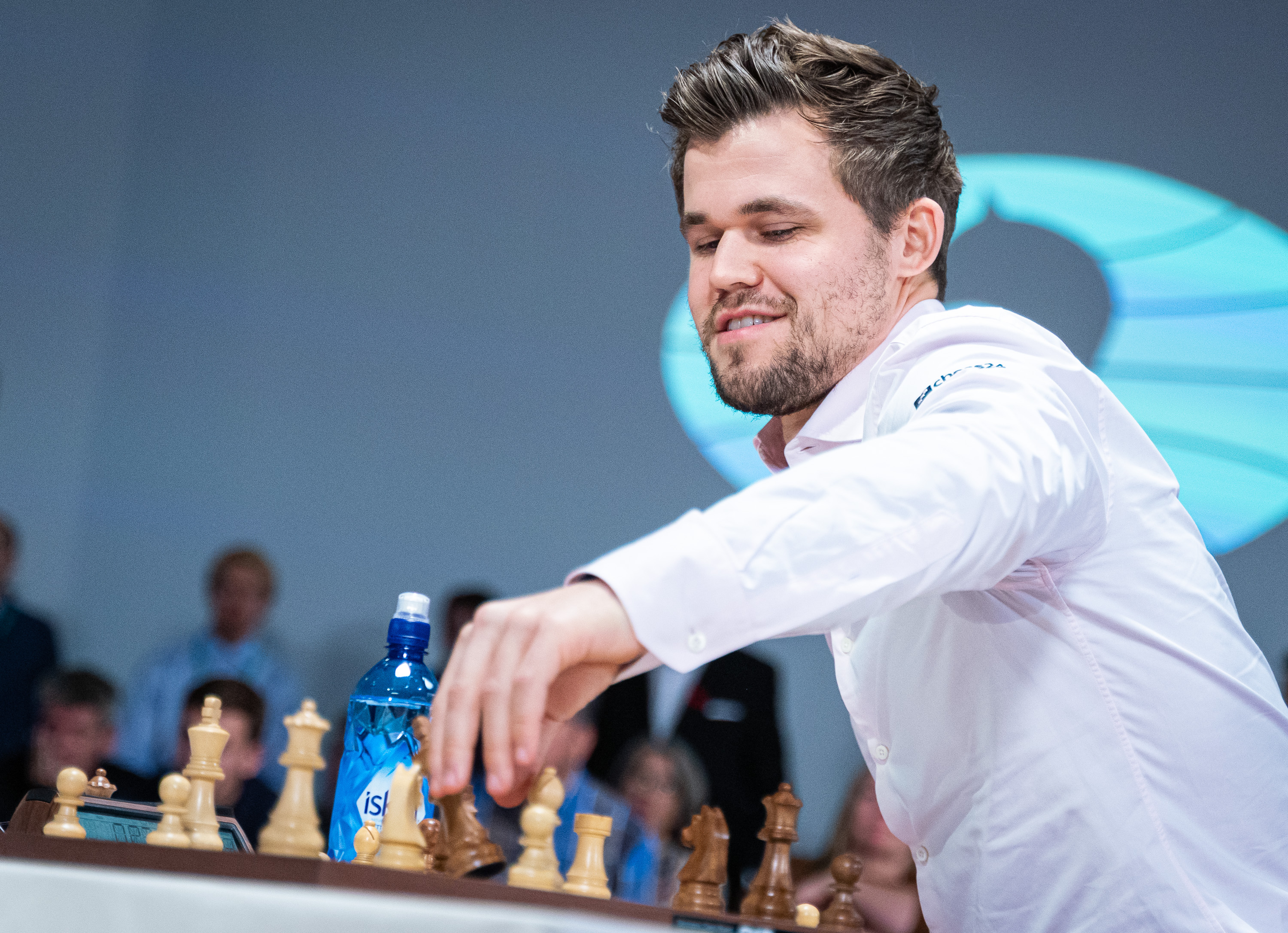
- Magnus Carlsen, winner of the tour

Details
- Duration: 18 April 2020 – 20 August 2020
- Tournaments: 5

Achievements (singles)
- Most titles: (Norway) Magnus Carlsen (4)
- Most finals: (Norway) Magnus Carlsen (4)

The 2020 Magnus Carlsen Chess Tour was a series of online chess tournaments featuring most of the world's best players, playing for a prize money pool of US$1 million. The tour consisted of four super-tournaments (elite competitions), with the winners then playing in a Grand Final in August 2020.

== Format ==
There were 5 total tournaments in the tour:

1. Magnus Carlsen Invitational, 18 April – 3 May 2020.
2. Lindores Abbey Rapid Challenge (2020), 19 May – 3 June 2020.
3. Chessable Masters (2020), 20 June – 5 July 2020.
4. Legends of Chess (2020) 21 July – 5 August 2020.
5. Magnus Carlsen Chess Tour Finals benefiting Kiva (2020), 9–20 August 2020.

=== Schedule ===
Dates	Tournament Name
18 April – 3 May 2020	Magnus Carlsen Invitational
19 May 19 – 3 June 2020	Lindores Abbey Rapid Challenge (2020)
20 June – 5 July 2020	Chessable Masters (2020)
21 July – 5 August 2020	Legends of Chess (2020)
9–20 August 2020	Magnus Carlsen Chess Tour Finals benefiting Kiva (2020)

== Results ==
Dates	Tournament Name	Winner	Runner-up	Semifinalists
18 April – 3 May 2020	Magnus Carlsen Invitational	(Norway) Magnus Carlsen	(United States) Hikaru Nakamura	(China) Ding Liren (United States) Fabiano Caruana
19 May 19 – 3 June 2020	Lindores Abbey Rapid Challenge (2020)	(Russia) Daniil Dubov	(United States) Hikaru Nakamura	(China) Ding Liren (Norway) Magnus Carlsen
20 June – 5 July 2020	Chessable Masters (2020)	(Norway) Magnus Carlsen (2)	(Netherlands) Anish Giri	(China) Ding Liren (Russia) Ian Nepomniachtchi
21 July – 5 August 2020	Legends of Chess (2020)	(Norway) Magnus Carlsen (3)	(Russia) Ian Nepomniachtchi	(Russia) Peter Svidler (Netherlands) Anish Giri
9–20 August 2020	Magnus Carlsen Chess Tour Finals benefiting Kiva (2020)	(Norway) Magnus Carlsen (4)	(United States) Hikaru Nakamura	(China) Ding Liren (Russia) Daniil Dubov

=== Tournaments ===
==== Magnus Carlsen Invitational ====
The results of the preliminary round were as follows.

	Name	ELO	01	02	03	04	05	06	07	08	Points
01	Hikaru Nakamura (United States)	2829	–	2	1	1	3	3	3	2	15
02	Ding Liren (China)	2836	1	–	3	1	3	3	2	2	15
03	Magnus Carlsen (Norway)	2881	2	0	–	3	2	3	0	3	13
04	Fabiano Caruana (United States)	2773	2	2	0	–	3	3	0	3	13
05	Ian Nepomniachtchi (Russia)	2778	0	0	1	0	–	2	3	2	8
06	Alireza Firouzja (FIDE)	2703	0	0	0	0	1	–	3	3	7
07	Anish Giri (Netherlands)	2731	0	1	3	3	0	0	–	0	7
08	Maxime Vachier-Lagrave (France)	2860	1	1	0	0	1	0	3	–	6

Semifinal (1–2 May)
(Norway) Magnus Carlsen	2½	–	–
(China) Ding Liren	1½	–	–
(United States) Fabiano Caruana	2	0	–
(United States) Hikaru Nakamura	2	2	–

Final (3 May)
(Norway) Magnus Carlsen	2½	–	–
(United States) Hikaru Nakamura	1½	–	–

==== Lindores Abbey Rapid Challenge ====
The results of the preliminary round were as follows.

	Name	ELO	01	02	03	04	05	06	07	08	09	10	11	12	Points
01	Hikaru Nakamura (United States)	2829	–	1	½	½	½	½	½	1	½	1	1	½	7½
02	Sergey Karjakin (Russia)	2709	0	–	1	½	½	½	½	½	½	1	1	1	7
03	Yu Yangyi (China)	2738	½	0	–	0	1	1	1	0	½	½	½	1	6
04	Wesley So (United States)	2741	½	½	1	–	½	½	0	½	½	½	½	1	6
05	Magnus Carlsen (Norway)	2881	½	½	0	½	–	½	0	1	1	1	0	1	6
06	Ding Liren (China)	2836	½	½	0	½	½	–	1	½	0	½	1	1	6
07	Daniil Dubov (Russia)	2770	½	½	0	1	1	0	–	½	1	½	0	½	5½
08	Levon Aronian (Armenia)	2778	0	½	1	½	0	½	½	–	½	1	½	½	5½
09	Alexander Grischuk (Russia)	2784	½	½	½	½	0	1	0	½	–	0	1	1	5½
10	Alireza Firouzja (FIDE)	2703	0	0	½	½	0	½	½	0	1	–	1	½	4½
11	Jan-Krzysztof Duda (Poland)	2774	0	0	½	½	1	0	1	½	0	0	–	½	4
12	Wei Yi (China)	2752	½	0	0	0	0	0	½	½	0	½	½	–	2½

Quarterfinal (May 23–27)
(United States) Hikaru Nakamura	3	3	-
(Armenia) Levon Aronian	2	1	-
(United States) Wesley So	1½	1½	-
(Norway) Magnus Carlsen	2½	2½	-
(Russia) Sergey Karjakin	0	3	0
(Russia) Daniil Dubov	3	2	3
(China) Yu Yangyi	3	1½	2
(China) Ding Liren	2	2½	3

Semifinal (May 28–30)
(United States) Hikaru Nakamura	0	2½	3
(Norway) Magnus Carlsen	3	1½	2
(Russia) Daniil Dubov	2½	2½	-
(China) Ding Liren	1½	1½	-

Final (June 2–3)
(United States) Hikaru Nakamura	2½	1½	2
(Russia) Daniil Dubov	1½	2½	3

==== Chessable Masters ====
The results of the preliminary round were as follows.

Group A

	Name	ELO	01	02	03	04	05	06	Points
01	Magnus Carlsen (Norway)	2881	– -	½ ½	½ 1	½ ½	0 1	1 ½	6
02	Vladislav Artemiev (Russia)	2769	½ ½	– -	½ ½	½ ½	1 0	1 1	6
03	Hikaru Nakamura (United States)	2829	½ 0	½ ½	– -	½ ½	½ 1	½ ½	5
04	Alexander Grischuk (Russia)	2784	½ ½	½ ½	½ ½	– -	½ ½	0 1	5
05	Daniil Dubov (Russia)	2770	1 0	0 1	½ 0	½ ½	– -	1 ½	5
06	Pentala Harikrishna (India)	2690	0 ½	0 0	½ ½	1 0	0 ½	– -	3

Group B

	Name	ELO	01	02	03	04	05	06	Points
01	Anish Giri (Netherlands)	2731	– -	½ 1	½ ½	1 ½	½ ½	½ ½	6
02	Ding Liren (China)	2836	½ 0	– -	½ 1	½ ½	½ ½	½ 1	5½
03	Ian Nepomniachtchi (Russia)	2778	½ ½	½ 0	– -	0 1	1 ½	½ 1	5½
04	Fabiano Caruana (United States)	2773	0 ½	½ ½	1 0	– -	1 ½	0 1	5
05	Teimour Radjabov (Azerbaijan)	2758	½ ½	½ ½	0 ½	0 ½	– -	½ 1	4½
06	Maxime Vachier-Lagrave (France)	2860	½ ½	½ 0	½ 0	1 0	½ 0	– -	3½

Quarterfinal (June 25–29)
(Norway) Magnus Carlsen	2½	2½	-
(United States) Fabiano Caruana	½	½	-
(China) Ding Liren	2½	3	2½
(United States) Hikaru Nakamura	1½	4	1½
(Russia) Alexander Grischuk	3½	1	-
(Netherlands) Anish Giri	3½	3	-
(Russia) Ian Nepomniachtchi	2½	2½	-
(Russia) Vladislav Artemiev	1½	1½	-

Semifinal (June 30 – July 2)
(Norway) Magnus Carlsen	3½	2½	-
(China) Ding Liren	2½	1½	-
(Netherlands) Anish Giri	3	1½	3½
(Russia) Ian Nepomniachtchi	1	2½	2½

Final (July 3–4)
(Norway) Magnus Carlsen	3½	2½	-
(Netherlands) Anish Giri	2½	1½	-

==== Legends of Chess ====
The results of the preliminary round were as follows.

	Name	ELO	01	02	03	04	05	06	07	08	09	10	Points
01	Magnus Carlsen (Norway)	2881	–	2	3	3	2	3	3	3	3	3	25
02	Ian Nepomniachtchi (Russia)	2778	1	–	3	3	3	2	1	3	2	2	20
03	Anish Giri (Netherlands)	2731	0	0	–	3	1	3	3	3	2	3	18
04	Peter Svidler (Russia)	2742	0	0	0	–	2	3	3	0	3	3	14
05	Vasyl Ivanchuk (Ukraine)	2686	1	0	2	1	–	3	0	3	2	1	13
06	Vladimir Kramnik (Russia)	2756	0	1	0	0	0	–	2	3	3	3	12
07	Boris Gelfand (Israel)	2702	0	2	0	0	3	1	–	3	0	2	11
08	Ding Liren (China)	2836	0	0	0	3	0	0	0	–	3	3	9
09	Viswanathan Anand (India)	2751	0	1	1	0	1	0	3	0	–	1	7
10	Peter Leko (Hungary)	2710	0	1	0	0	2	0	1	0	2	–	6

Semifinal (1–2 May)
(Norway) Magnus Carlsen	2½	2½	–
(Russia) Peter Svidler	1½	1½	–
(Russia) Ian Nepomniachtchi	2½	3	3½
(Netherlands) Anish Giri	1½	4	2½

Final (3 May)
(Norway) Magnus Carlsen	4	2½	–
(Russia) Ian Nepomniachtchi	2	½	–

==== Magnus Carlsen Chess Tour Finals benefiting Kiva ====
The results of the preliminary round were as follows.

Semifinals (9–12 August)
(Norway) Magnus Carlsen	3½	2½	2½	3½	–
(China) Ding Liren	3½ (Note: Ding Liren won set 1 of the semifinal after drawing as black in the Armageddon game.)	½	½	2½	–
(Russia) Daniil Dubov	2½	1	1½	–	–
(United States) Hikaru Nakamura	3½	3	2½	–	–

Final
(Norway) Magnus Carlsen	1½	3½	2½	2½	3	3	3½ (Note: Carlsen won set 7 of the final after drawing as black in the Armageddon game.)
(United States) Hikaru Nakamura	2½	2½	3½	1½	4	1	3½
