= Magnus Carlsen Invitational =

2020 online chess tournament

The Magnus Carlsen Invitational 2020 was an online chess tournament that ran from 18 April to 3 May 2020 as the first round of the Magnus Carlsen Chess Tour.

== History ==
In addition to the world chess champion Magnus Carlsen, who organized the tournament, Fabiano Caruana, Ding Liren, Alireza Firouzja, Anish Giri, Hikaru Nakamura, Ian Nepomniachtchi, and Maxime Vachier-Lagrave took part in the event. The tournament received media attention as one of the few sports events during the early stages of the COVID-19 pandemic.

The tournament was structured as a series of mini-matches, consisting of four games of rapid chess, if needed followed by two rounds of blitz chess (semi-finals and final only), if needed followed by an Armageddon tie-break. The winner after rapid games received 3 points, the loser 0 points; if a tie-break was necessary, the winner received 2 points and the loser 1 point. The eight players played a round robin with the top four advancing to the semi-finals. Carlsen beat Nakamura in the final to win the tournament.

The tournament was broadcast by Chess24.com with Jan Gustafsson, Peter Svidler, Tania Sachdev and Lawrence Trent providing most of the commentary.

== Group stage results ==
Player 1	Player 2	Score
Round 1. 18 April 2020
Magnus Carlsen	Hikaru Nakamura	3 – 2
Ding Liren	Alireza Firouzja	2.5 – 1.5
Round 1. 19 April 2020
Fabiano Caruana	Ian Nepomniachtchi	2.5 – 1.5
Maxime Vachier-Lagrave	Anish Giri	3 – 1
Round 2. 20 April 2020
Magnus Carlsen	Alireza Firouzja	2.5 – 1.5
Hikaru Nakamura	Anish Giri	2.5 – 1.5
Round 2. 21 April 2020
Ian Nepomniachtchi	Maxime Vachier-Lagrave	3 – 2
Fabiano Caruana	Ding Liren	3 – 2
Round 3. 22 April 2020
Magnus Carlsen	Fabiano Caruana	3 – 1
Hikaru Nakamura	Alireza Firouzja	3.5 – 0.5
Round 3. 23 April 2020
Maxime Vachier-Lagrave	Ding Liren	2 – 3
Anish Giri	Ian Nepomniachtchi	1.5 – 2.5
Round 4. 24 April 2020
Magnus Carlsen	Maxime Vachier-Lagrave	2.5 – 1.5
Alireza Firouzja	Fabiano Caruana	1 – 3
Round 4. 25 April 2020
Hikaru Nakamura	Ian Nepomniachtchi	2.5 – 1.5
Ding Liren	Anish Giri	3 – 2
Round 5. 26 April 2020
Anish Giri	Magnus Carlsen	2.5 – 1.5
Maxime Vachier-Lagrave	Alireza Firouzja	1.5 – 2.5
Round 5. 27 April 2020
Fabiano Caruana	Hikaru Nakamura	3 – 2
Ian Nepomniachtchi	Ding Liren	1.5 – 2.5
Round 6. 28 April 2020
Magnus Carlsen	Ian Nepomniachtchi	3 – 2
Alireza Firouzja	Anish Giri	2.5 – 1.5
Round 6. 29 April 2020
Hikaru Nakamura	Ding Liren	3 – 2
Fabiano Caruana	Maxime Vachier-Lagrave	2.5 – 1.5
Round 7. 30 April 2020
Ding Liren	Magnus Carlsen	3 – 1
Ian Nepomniachtchi	Alireza Firouzja	3 – 2
Maxime Vachier-Lagrave	Hikaru Nakamura	2 – 3
Anish Giri	Fabiano Caruana	2.5 – 1.5

== Group stage standings ==
Pl.	Player	M.	W	AW	AL	L	Points
1	Hikaru Nakamura	7	3	2	2	0	15
2	Ding Liren	7	3	2	2	0	15
3	Magnus Carlsen	7	3	2	0	2	13
4	Fabiano Caruana	7	3	2	0	2	13
5	Ian Nepomniachtchi	7	1	2	1	3	8
6	Alireza Firouzja	7	2	0	1	4	7
7	Anish Giri	7	2	0	1	4	7
8	Maxime Vachier-Lagrave	7	1	0	3	3	6

== Play-offs ==
Semifinals (1 and 2 May 2020)
1	Hikaru Nakamura	4
4	Fabiano Caruana	2
2	Ding Liren	1.5
3	Magnus Carlsen	2.5

Final (3 May 2020)
1	Hikaru Nakamura	1.5
3	Magnus Carlsen	2.5
