= 2025 Esports World Cup – Chess =

Chess tournament at the 2025 Esports World Cup

Chess at the 2025 Esports World Cup
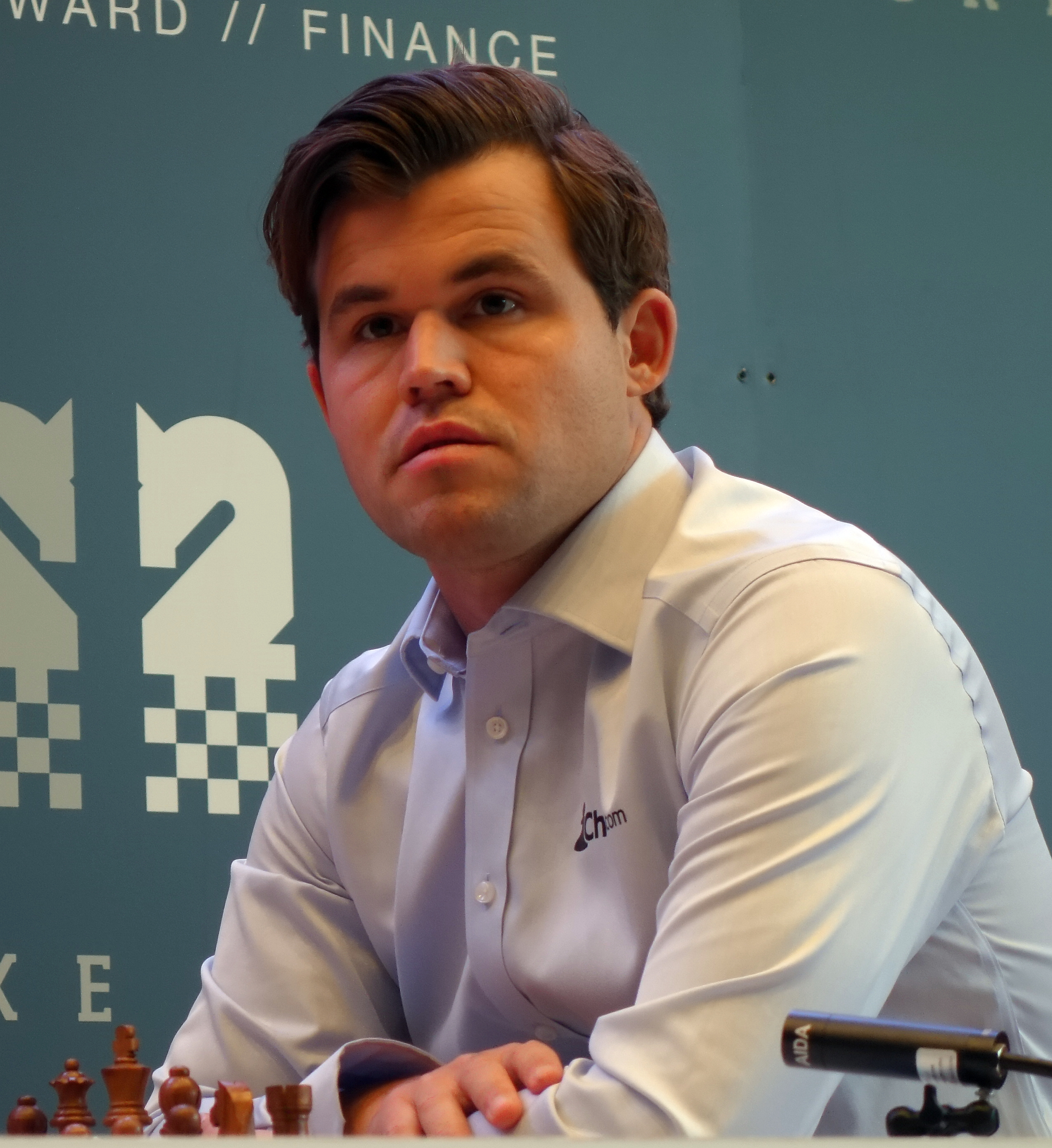
- Magnus Carlsen, the winner of the inaugural edition.

Tournament information
- Game: Chess
- Location: Riyadh, Saudi Arabia
- Date: July 29 – Aug 1, 2025
- Administrator: Esports World Cup Foundation; Chess.com
- Tournament format(s): 16 player GSL-style group stage 8 player single-elimination bracket
- Participants: 16 from 13 teams
- Purse: US$1,500,000
- Website: esportsworldcup.com/chess

Final positions
- Champion: Magnus Carlsen (Team Liquid)
- Runner-up: Alireza Firouzja (Team Falcons)

The chess tournament at the 2025 Esports World Cup was held in Riyadh, Saudi Arabia, from July 29 to August 1, 2025. Sixteen players from thirteen teams took part in this tournament – 12 players from Champions Chess Tour 2025 standings and 4 players from the Last Chance Qualifier. 13 Teams qualified based on their player's performance in these tournaments. Magnus Carlsen from Team Liquid defeated Alireza Firouzja from Team Falcons in the Grand final with 4 rounds to spare.

It was the first chess tournament at the Esports World Cup, which is part of a two-year partnership between online gaming platform Chess.com and the Esports World Cup Foundation until 2026 to bring online chess into the event.

== Format ==
In the group stage, the sixteen players from thirteen (13) teams were divided into four groups and competed in a GSL-style double elimination bracket, with the first two players to achieve two wins advancing to the quarterfinals. The opening matches were best-of-twos but the remaining matches were best-of-threes.

The playoffs were an eight-player single-elimination bracket. The players who lost in the semifinals competed in a third-place match. Quarterfinal matches in the playoffs were best-of-fours, while the semifinal matches and the third-place playoff were best-of-six. The Grand Final were a best-of-three set match, with the first two set consisting of four games each and the third set consisting of two games.

== Qualification ==
Twelve players qualified through their standings in the Champions Chess Tour 2025, and four from the Last Chance Qualifier.

=== Qualified teams ===
Event	Qualifier
Champions Chess Tour 2025	Magnus Carlsen (Team Liquid)
Champions Chess Tour 2025	Hikaru Nakamura (Team Falcons)
Champions Chess Tour 2025	Ian Nepomniachtchi (Aurora Gaming)
Champions Chess Tour 2025	Maxime Vachier-Lagrave (Team Vitality)
Champions Chess Tour 2025	Jan-Krzysztof Duda (Twisted Minds)
Champions Chess Tour 2025	Arjun Erigaisi (Gen.G Esports)
Champions Chess Tour 2025	Nodirbek Abdusattorov (Natus Vincere)
Champions Chess Tour 2025	Vladislav Artemiev (Team Spirit)
Champions Chess Tour 2025	Alireza Firouzja (Team Falcons)
Champions Chess Tour 2025	~~Vladimir Fedoseev~~ (withdrew)
Champions Chess Tour 2025	Fabiano Caruana (Team Liquid)
Champions Chess Tour 2025	Wei Yi (Weibo Gaming)
Last Chance Qualifier	Javokhir Sindarov (Team Vitality)
Last Chance Qualifier	Nihal Sarin (S8UL Esports)
Last Chance Qualifier	Levon Aronian (REJECT)
Last Chance Qualifier	Anish Giri (Team Secret)
Last Chance Qualifier	Andrey Esipenko (Virtus.pro) (highest non-qualifier, replacement for Fedoseev)

== Draw ==
A draw was conducted for the group stage on 28 July 2025.

Group A	Group B	Group C	Group D
Andrey Esipenko (Virtus.pro)	Anish Giri (Team Secret)	Alireza Firouzja (Team Falcons)	Fabiano Caruana (Team Liquid)
Ian Nepomniachtchi (Aurora Gaming)	Arjun Erigaisi (Gen.G Esports)	Hikaru Nakamura (Team Falcons)	Jan-Krzysztof Duda (Twisted Minds)
Levon Aronian (REJECT)	Maxime Vachier-Lagrave (Team Vitality)	Javokhir Sindarov (Team Vitality)	Magnus Carlsen (Team Liquid)
Vladislav Artemiev (Team Spirit)	Nihal Sarin (S8UL Esports)	Wei Yi (Weibo Gaming)	Nodirbek Abdusattorov (Natus Vincere)

== Group stage ==
- Dates: 29–30 July 2025
- 16 players from thirteen teams were drawn into four groups of four players each.
- Each group plays a double-elimination-style bracket.
- The top two players from each group advance to the Playoffs. Remaining players are eliminated.
- Time control: 10+0
- In the Armageddon, the player who either wins or draws with the black pieces gets a full point and wins the match.

=== Group A ===
Opening Match
29 July, 15:00 AST
A Esipenko (Virtus.pro)	1.5
I Nepomniachtchi (Aurora Gaming)	0.5
29 July, 15:00 AST
V Artemiev (Team Spirit)	1
L Aronian (REJECT)	2
Elimination Match
30 July, 15:00 AST
I Nepomniachtchi (Aurora Gaming)	1.5
V Artemiev (Team Spirit)	0.5

Winners Match
29 July, 20:20 AST
A Esipenko (Virtus.pro)	0
L Aronian (REJECT)	2
Decider Match
30 July, 16:20 AST
A Esipenko (Virtus.pro)	1
I Nepomniachtchi (Aurora Gaming)	2

Playoffs Qualified
L Aronian (REJECT)
I Nepomniachtchi (Aurora Gaming)

Opening Match	29 July	Andrey Esipenko	1.5	–	0.5	Ian Nepomniachtchi	Riyadh, Saudi Arabia
	15:00 (UTC+3)						
		0.5	Game 1			0.5	
		1	Game 2			0	

Opening Match	29 July	Vladislav Artemiev	1	–	2	Levon Aronian	Riyadh, Saudi Arabia
	15:00 (UTC+3)						
		0	Game 1			1	
		1	Game 2			0	
		0.5	Armageddon			0.5	

Winners' Match	29 July	Levon Aronian	2	–	0	Andrey Esipenko	Riyadh, Saudi Arabia
	20:20 (UTC+3)						
		1	Game 1			0	
		1	Game 2			0	

Elimination Match	30 July	Ian Nepomniachtchi	1.5	–	0.5	Vladislav Artemiev	Riyadh, Saudi Arabia
	15:00 (UTC+3)						
		1	Game 1			0	
		0.5	Game 2			0.5	

Decider Match	30 July	Andrey Esipenko	1	–	2	Ian Nepomniachtchi	Riyadh, Saudi Arabia
	16:20 (UTC+3)						
		1	Game 1			0	
		0	Game 2			1	
		0.5	Armageddon			0.5	

=== Group B ===
Opening Match
29 July, 16:10 AST
A Giri (Team Secret)	0.5
M Vachier-Lagrave (Team Vitality)	1.5
29 July, 16:10 AST
N Sarin (S8UL Esports)	0
A Erigaisi (Gen.G Esports)	2
Elimination Match
30 July, 15:00 AST
A Giri (Team Secret)	0
N Sarin (S8UL Esports)	2

Winners Match
29 July, 20:20 AST
M Vachier-Lagrave (Team Vitality)	1
A Erigaisi (Gen.G Esports)	2
Decider Match
30 July, 16:20 AST
M Vachier-Lagrave (Team Vitality)	0.5
N Sarin (S8UL Esports)	1.5

Playoffs Qualified
A Erigaisi (Gen.G Esports)
N Sarin (S8UL Esports)

Opening Match	29 July	Anish Giri	0.5	–	1.5	Maxime Vachier-Lagrave	Riyadh, Saudi Arabia
	16:10 (UTC+3)						
		0	Game 1			1	
		0.5	Game 2			0.5	

Opening Match	29 July	Nihal Sarin	0	–	2	Arjun Erigaisi	Riyadh, Saudi Arabia
	16:10 (UTC+3)						
		0	Game 1			1	
		0	Game 2			1	

Winners' Match	29 July	Maxime Vachier-Lagrave	1	–	2	Arjun Erigaisi	Riyadh, Saudi Arabia
	20:20 (UTC+3)						
		0	Game 1			1	
		1	Game 2			0	
		0	Armageddon			1	

Elimination Match	30 July	Anish Giri	0	–	2	Nihal Sarin	Riyadh, Saudi Arabia
	15:00 (UTC+3)						
		0	Game 1			1	
		0	Game 2			1	

Decider Match	30 July	Maxime Vachier-Lagrave	0.5	–	1.5	Nihal Sarin	Riyadh, Saudi Arabia
	16:20 (UTC+3)						
		0.5	Game 1			0.5	
		0	Game 2			1	

=== Group C ===
Opening Match
29 July, 17:40 AST
J Sindarov (Team Vitality)	0
H Nakamura (Team Falcons)	2
29 July, 17:40 AST
A Firouzja (Team Falcons)	1.5
Y Wei (Weibo Gaming)	0.5
Elimination Match
30 July, 17:40 AST
J Sindarov (Team Vitality)	0
Y Wei (Weibo Gaming)	2

Winners Match
29 July, 21:40 AST
H Nakamura (Team Falcons)	1
A Firouzja (Team Falcons)	2
Decider Match
30 July, 20:20 AST
H Nakamura (Team Falcons)	2
Y Wei (Weibo Gaming)	1

Playoffs Qualified
A Firouzja (Team Falcons)
H Nakamura (Team Falcons)

Opening Match	29 July	Javokhir Sindarov	0	–	2	Hikaru Nakamura	Riyadh, Saudi Arabia
	17:40 (UTC+3)						
		0	Game 1			1	
		0	Game 2			1	

Opening Match	29 July	Alireza Firouzja	1.5	–	0.5	Wei Yi	Riyadh, Saudi Arabia
	17:40 (UTC+3)						
		1	Game 1			0	
		0.5	Game 2			0.5	

Winners' Match	29 July	Hikaru Nakamura	1	–	2	Alireza Firouzja	Riyadh, Saudi Arabia
	21:40 (UTC+3)						
		0.5	Game 1			0.5	
		0.5	Game 2			0.5	
		0.5	Armageddon			0.5	

Elimination Match	30 July	Javokhir Sindarov	0	–	2	Wei Yi	Riyadh, Saudi Arabia
	17:40 (UTC+3)						
		0	Game 1			1	
		0	Game 2			1	

Decider Match	30 July	Hikaru Nakamura	2	–	1	Wei Yi	Riyadh, Saudi Arabia
	20:20 (UTC+3)						
		0.5	Game 1			0.5	
		0.5	Game 2			0.5	
		1	Armageddon			0	

=== Group D ===
Opening Match
29 July, 19:00 AST
N Abdusattorov (Natus Vincere)	0.5
M Carlsen (Team Liquid)	1.5
29 July, 19:00 AST
J-K Duda (Twisted Minds)	1.5
F Caruana (Team Liquid)	0.5
Elimination Match
30 July, 19:00 AST
N Abdusattorov (Natus Vincere)	2
F Caruana (Team Liquid)	1

Winners Match
29 July, 21:40 AST
M Carlsen (Team Liquid)	1.5
J-K Duda (Twisted Minds)	0.5
Decider Match
30 July, 21:40 AST
J-K Duda (Twisted Minds)	1
N Abdusattorov (Natus Vincere)	2

Playoffs Qualified
M Carlsen (Team Liquid)
N Abdusattorov (Natus Vincere)

Opening Match	29 July	Nodirbek Abdusattorov	0.5	–	1.5	Magnus Carlsen	Riyadh, Saudi Arabia
	19:00 (UTC+3)						
		0	Game 1			1	
		0.5	Game 2			0.5	

Opening Match	29 July	Jan-Krzysztof Duda	1.5	–	0.5	Fabiano Caruana	Riyadh, Saudi Arabia
	19:00 (UTC+3)						
		0.5	Game 1			0.5	
		1	Game 2			0	

Winners' Match	29 July	Magnus Carlsen	1.5	–	0.5	Jan-Krzysztof Duda	Riyadh, Saudi Arabia
	21:40 (UTC+3)						
		1	Game 1			0	
		0.5	Game 2			0.5	

Elimination Match	30 July	Nodirbek Abdusattorov	2	–	1	Fabiano Caruana	Riyadh, Saudi Arabia
	19:00 (UTC+3)						
		1	Game 1			0	
		0	Game 2			1	
		1	Armageddon			0	

Decider Match	31 July	Jan-Krzysztof Duda	1	–	2	Nodirbek Abdusattorov	Riyadh, Saudi Arabia
	21:40 (UTC+3)						
		0.5	Game 1			0.5	
		0.5	Game 2			0.5	
		0	Armageddon			1	

== Playoffs ==
- Dates: 31 July – 1 August 2025
- Eight players will be drawn into matchups based on a draw.
- Time control: 10+0
- In the Armageddon, the player who either wins or draws with the black pieces gets a full point and wins the match.

Quarterfinals
31 July, 15:00 AST
Alireza Firouzja (Team Falcons)	3
Nodirbek Abdusattorov (Natus Vincere)	1
31 July, 15:00 AST
Ian Nepomniachtchi (Aurora Gaming)	1.5
Arjun Erigaisi (Gen.G Esports)	2.5
31 July, 17:00 AST
Levon Aronian (REJECT)	1.5
Hikaru Nakamura (Team Falcons)	2.5
31 July, 17:00 AST
Magnus Carlsen (Team Liquid)	2.5
Nihal Sarin (S8UL Esports)	0.5

Semifinals
31 July, 19:00 AST
Alireza Firouzja (Team Falcons)	4
Arjun Erigaisi (Gen.G Esports)	1
31 July, 21:40 AST
Hikaru Nakamura (Team Falcons)	3
Magnus Carlsen (Team Liquid)	4

Final
1 August, 19:00 AST
Alireza Firouzja (Team Falcons)	0
Magnus Carlsen (Team Liquid)	2
Third place
1 August, 16:00 AST
Arjun Erigaisi (Gen.G Esports)	2.5
Hikaru Nakamura (Team Falcons)	3.5

Quarterfinals	31 July	Alireza Firouzja	3	–	1	Nodirbek Abdusattorov	Riyadh, Saudi Arabia
	15:00 (UTC+3)						
		0.5	Game 1			0.5	
		0.5	Game 2			0.5	
		1	Game 3			0	
		1	Game 4			0	

Quarterfinals	31 July	Ian Nepomniachtchi	1.5	–	2.5	Arjun Erigaisi	Riyadh, Saudi Arabia
	15:00 (UTC+3)						
		0.5	Game 1			0.5	
		0	Game 2			1	
		1	Game 3			0	
		0	Game 4			1	

Quarterfinals	31 July	Levon Aronian	1.5	–	2.5	Hikaru Nakamura	Riyadh, Saudi Arabia
	17:00 (UTC+3)						
		0.5	Game 1			0.5	
		0	Game 2			1	
		1	Game 3			0	
		0	Game 4			1	

Quarterfinals	31 July	Magnus Carlsen	2.5	–	0.5	Nihal Sarin	Riyadh, Saudi Arabia
	17:00 (UTC+3)						
		0.5	Game 1			0.5	
		1	Game 2			0	
		1	Game 3			0	
			~~Game 4~~				

Semifinals	31 July	Alireza Firouzja	4	–	1	Arjun Erigaisi	Riyadh, Saudi Arabia
	19:00 (UTC+3)						
		1	Game 1			0	
		0.5	Game 2			0.5	
		1	Game 3			0	
		0.5	Game 4			0.5	
		1	Game 5			0	
			~~Game 6~~				

Semifinals	31 July	Hikaru Nakamura	3	–	4	Magnus Carlsen	Riyadh, Saudi Arabia
	21:40 (UTC+3)						
		0	Game 1			1	
		0.5	Game 2			0.5	
		1	Game 3			0	
		0	Game 4			1	
		0.5	Game 5			0.5	
		1	Game 6			0	
		0	Armageddon			1	

Third Place Playoff	1 August	Arjun Erigaisi	2.5	–	3.5	Hikaru Nakamura	Riyadh, Saudi Arabia
	16:00 (UTC+3)						
		1	Game 1			0	
		0.5	Game 2			0.5	
		0	Game 3			1	
		0	Game 4			1	
		1	Game 5			0	
		0	Game 6			1	

Grand Final	1 August	Alireza Firouzja	0	–	2	Magnus Carlsen	Riyadh, Saudi Arabia
	19:00 (UTC+3)						
		0	(Set 1) Game 1			1	
		0.5	Game 2			0.5	
		0.5	Game 3			0.5	
		0	Game 4			1	
		1	(Set 2) Game 1			0	
		0	Game 2			1	
		0	Game 3			1	
		0	Game 4			1	

== Ranking ==
A base prize pool of US$1,500,000 had been offered for the tournament. The prize pool was spread among the players as seen below:

Place	Team	Prize (USD)
1st	Magnus Carlsen (Team Liquid)	$250,000
2nd	Alireza Firouzja (Team Falcons)	$190,000
3rd	Hikaru Nakamura (Team Falcons)	$145,000
4th	Arjun Erigaisi (Gen.G Esports)	$115,000
5th–8th	Ian Nepomniachtchi (Aurora Gaming)	$90,000
5th–8th	Nodirbek Abdusattorov (Natus Vincere)	$90,000
5th–8th	Levon Aronian (REJECT)	$90,000
5th–8th	Nihal Sarin (S8UL Esports)	$90,000
9th–12th	Andrey Esipenko (Virtus.pro)	$65,000
9th–12th	Maxime Vachier-Lagrave (Team Vitality)	$65,000
9th–12th	Wei Yi (Weibo Gaming)	$65,000
9th–12th	Jan-Krzysztof Duda (Twisted Minds)	$65,000
13th–16th	Vladislav Artemiev (Team Spirit)	$50,000
13th–16th	Anish Giri (Team Secret)	$50,000
13th–16th	Javokhir Sindarov (Team Vitality)	$50,000
13th–16th	Fabiano Caruana (Team Liquid)	$50,000
