= Zurich Chess Challenge =

International chess tournament in Switzerland

The Zurich Chess Challenge (ZCC) was a major recurring international chess event, combining rapid chess with classical or blitz chess. Zurich was an exhibition tournament, similar to the former Amber chess tournament, which explained some laxness and the comparatively brief duration of the whole event. It took place in Zurich, Switzerland. The main sponsor was Russian businessman Oleg Skvortsov.

== Winners ==
#	Year	Challenge winner
1	2012	Two-player match resulted in a draw
2	2013	Fabiano Caruana (Italy)
3	2014	Magnus Carlsen (Norway)
4	2015	Hikaru Nakamura (United States)
5	2016	Hikaru Nakamura (United States)
6	2017	Hikaru Nakamura (United States)

== Zurich Chess Challenge 2012 ==
The Zurich Chess Challenge 2012 was a six-game chess match between Vladimir Kramnik (Russia) and Levon Aronian (Armenia) from 21 to 28 April 2012. Each player won one game and there were four draws.

	Rating	1	2	3	4	5	6	Total	Rating change
Vladimir Kramnik (Russia)	2801	0	½	1	½	½	½	3	+2
Levon Aronian (Armenia)	2820	1	½	0	½	½	½	3	−2

== Zurich Chess Challenge 2013 ==
Italy's Fabiano Caruana won the Zurich Chess Challenge 2013 which took place from 23 February to 1 March 2013.

No	Player	Rating	1	2	3	4	Points	Rating change
1	Fabiano Caruana (ITA)	2757		½ 1	½ ½	½ 1	4	+12
2	Viswanathan Anand (IND)	2780	½ 0		½ 1	½ ½	3	−1
3	Vladimir Kramnik (RUS)	2810	½ ½	½ 0		½ ½	2½	−9
4	Boris Gelfand (ISR)	2740	½ 0	½ ½	½ ½		2½	−1

== Zurich Chess Challenge 2014 ==
The Zurich Chess Challenge 2014 took place from 29 January to 4 February 2014. The average rating of its participants was 2801, the highest ever at the time, and it was also the first category 23 tournament ever. Magnus Carlsen won the tournament.

The opening day included five rounds of blitz to decide the draw, which was won by Carlsen. The main tournament consisted of five rounds of classical chess and finally five rounds of rapid chess on the closure day.

=== Blitz results ===
No	Player	Blitz rating	1	2	3	4	5	6	Points	SB
1	Magnus Carlsen (NOR)	2837		½	1	0	1	½	3	7.25
2	Levon Aronian (ARM)	2863	½		0	½	1	1	3	6.75
3	Hikaru Nakamura (USA)	2879	0	1		1	½	0	2½	6.75
4	Fabiano Caruana (ITA)	2697	1	½	0		0	1	2½	6
5	Viswanathan Anand (IND)	2827	0	0	½	1		1	2½	5.25
6	Boris Gelfand (ISR)	2719	½	0	1	0	0		1½	4

=== Classical results ===
No	Player	FIDE rank	Rating	1	2	3	4	5	6	Points	Rating change
1	Magnus Carlsen (NOR)	1	2872		½	1	1	½	1	8	+9
2	Levon Aronian (ARM)	2	2812	½		0	1	1	½	6	+4
3	Fabiano Caruana (ITA)	6	2782	0	1		½	½	½	5	+2
4	Hikaru Nakamura (USA)	3	2789	0	0	½		1	½	4	−4
5	Viswanathan Anand (IND)	9	2773	½	0	½	0		1	4	−3
6	Boris Gelfand (ISR)	8	2777	0	½	½	½	0		3	−8

For games that ended in a draw in under 40 moves, a subsequent rapid game between the two players was mandatory, although these particular rapid games had no relevance to the tournament standings. Two such games were played: Gelfand–Aronian (0–1) in the third round and Gelfand–Nakamura (1–0) in the fifth round.

=== Rapid results ===
No	Player	Rapid rating	1	2	3	4	5	6	Points	Rating change
1	Fabiano Caruana (ITA)	2812		1	½	1	½	1	4	+28
2	Hikaru Nakamura (USA)	2826	0		1	½	1	1	3½	+15
3	Levon Aronian (ARM)	2770	½	0		1	½	1	3	+15
4	Magnus Carlsen (NOR)	2845	0	½	0		1	½	2	−18
5	Boris Gelfand (ISR)	2735	½	0	½	0		½	1½	−10
6	Viswanathan Anand (IND)	2800	0	0	0	½	½		1	−30

=== Combined final results ===
The combined final score for the tournament was calculated by scoring each game in the classical competition on a 2–1–0 basis and each game in the rapid competition on a 1–½–0 basis.

No	Player	Points
1	Magnus Carlsen (NOR)	10
2	Fabiano Caruana (ITA)	9
3	Levon Aronian (ARM)	9
4	Hikaru Nakamura (USA)	7½
5	Viswanathan Anand (IND)	5
6	Boris Gelfand (ISR)	4½

== Zurich Chess Challenge 2015 ==
The 2015 tournament featured Fabiano Caruana, Viswanathan Anand, Vladimir Kramnik, Levon Aronian, Sergey Karjakin and Hikaru Nakamura. The tournament was held from 13–19 February 2015 at the Hotel Savoy Baur en Ville in Zurich.

A blitz tournament determined the color distribution on the first day of the tournament (Friday, 13 February, 2015). After the opening, 5 classical games were played following by another 5 rapid games on the last day of the tournament. The rules stated that wins (2 points) and draws (1) count double for classical games, with a draw before move 40 “punished” by an extra rapid game.

Viswanathan Anand and Hikaru Nakamura ended up with 9 points. For determining the winner, although it was said before that the previous games between the two must decide the result, they changed the rules midway and asked the players to play an armageddon game in which Hikaru Nakamura won with black and ended up as the tournament winner.

=== Blitz results ===
No	Player	Blitz rating	1	2	3	4	5	6	Points	SB
1	Levon Aronian (ARM)	2777		½	1	1	½	1	4	8.75
2	Fabiano Caruana (ITA)	2811	½		½	½	1	1	3.5	6.75
3	Viswanathan Anand (IND)	2797	0	½		1	1	1	3.5	5.75
4	Hikaru Nakamura (USA)	2776	0	½	0		½	1	2	3.25
5	Vladimir Kramnik (RUS)	2783	½	0	0	½		0	1	3
6	Sergey Karjakin (RUS)	2760	0	0	0	0	1		1	1

=== Classical results ===
No	Player	Rating	1	2	3	4	5	6	Points	SB
1	Viswanathan Anand (IND)	2797		2	1	1	1	2	7	16.5
2	Hikaru Nakamura (USA)	2776	0		1	2	2	1	6	12.5
3	Vladimir Kramnik (RUS)	2783	1	1		1	1	1	5	12.5
4	Sergey Karjakin (RUS)	2760	1	0	1		1	1	4	10
5	Fabiano Caruana (ITA)	2811	1	0	1	1		1	4	10
6	Levon Aronian (ARM)	2777	0	1	1	1	1		4	9.5

=== Rapid results ===
No	Player	Rapid rating	1	2	3	4	5	6	Points	SB
1	Vladimir Kramnik (RUS)	2783		1	1	0	½	1	3.5	7.75
2	Levon Aronian (ARM)	2777	0		½	1	1	½	3	6.25
3	Hikaru Nakamura (USA)	2776	0	½		½	1	1	3	6
4	Sergey Karjakin (RUS)	2760	1	0	½		½	0	2	6
5	Viswanathan Anand (IND)	2797	½	0	0	½		1	2	4.25
6	Fabiano Caruana (ITA)	2811	0	½	0	1	0		1.5	2.5

=== Tiebreak ===
After the games Nakamura and Anand were the leaders with 9 point. An armageddon tiebreak game between the two tied leaders, Anand and Nakamura. White was given five minutes, black four. White had to win in order to win the tournament. Hikaru Nakamura won as black making him the winner of the tournament.

=== Combined final results ===
The combined final score for the tournament was calculated by scoring each game in the classical competition on a 2–1–0 basis and each game in the rapid competition on a 1–½–0 basis.

No	Player	Points
1	Hikaru Nakamura (USA)	9.0
2	Viswanathan Anand (IND)	9.0
3	Vladimir Kramnik (RUS)	8.5
4	Levon Aronian (ARM)	7.0
5	Sergey Karjakin (RUS)	6.0
6	Fabiano Caruana (ITA)	5.5

== Zurich Chess Challenge 2016 ==
In the 2016 tournament, held from 12–15 February 2016, starting on a Friday and already ending on the following Monday, players were awarded two points for a win and one point for a draw in the rapid section, and one point for a win and half a point for a draw in the blitz section. No classical chess was played. Hikaru Nakamura won the blitz section on tiebreaks and tied with Viswanathan Anand in the rapid section. Nakamura won the overall event.

The tournament was also held alongside a match between Alexander Morozevich and Boris Gelfand.

=== Rapid results ===
No	Player	Rapid rating	1	2	3	4	5	6	Points	SB
1	Viswanathan Anand (IND)	2777		1	1	2	1	2	7	15
2	Hikaru Nakamura (USA)	2842	1		1	2	2	1	7	15
3	Vladimir Kramnik (RUS)	2793	1	1		1	1	2	6	13.5
4	Levon Aronian (ARM)	2746	0	0	1		2	1	4	7.5
5	Alexei Shirov (LAT)	2682	1	0	1	0		1	3	8
6	Anish Giri (NED)	2756	0	1	0	1	1		3	7

=== Blitz results ===
No	Player	Blitz rating	1	2	3	4	5	6	Points	SB
1	Hikaru Nakamura (USA)	2884		½	½	1	1	½	3.5	7.75
2	Viswanathan Anand (IND)	2764	½		½	½	1	1	3.5	6.75
3	Vladimir Kramnik (RUS)	2817	½	½		½	1	1	3.5	6.75
4	Anish Giri (NED)	2793	0	½	½		½	1	2.5	4.75
5	Levon Aronian (ARM)	2814	0	0	0	½		1	1.5	1.75
6	Alexei Shirov (LAT)	2682	½	0	0	0	0		0.5	1.75

=== Combined final results ===
No	Player	Points	SB
1	Hikaru Nakamura (USA)	10.5	22.75
2	Viswanathan Anand (IND)	10.5	21.75
3	Vladimir Kramnik (RUS)	9.5	20.25
4	Anish Giri (NED)	5.5	11.75
5	Levon Aronian (ARM)	5.5	9.25
6	Alexei Shirov (LAT)	3.5	9.75

=== Exhibition match results ===
A two-game exhibition match was played between Alexander Morozevich and Boris Gelfand, in the same time control as the rapid portion of the main tournament. Boris Gelfand won the mini-match.

	Player	Rapid rating	1	2	Points
1	Boris Gelfand (ISR)	2735	½	1	1½
2	Alexander Morozevich (RUS)	2683	½	0	½

== Zurich Chess Challenge 2017 ==
Hikaru Nakamura won the tournament by winning the blitz tournament half a point ahead of the Viswanathan Anand and a full point ahead of Ian Nepomniachtchi.

=== Rapid result ===
No	Player	Rapid rating	1	2	3	4	5	6	7	8	Points
1	Hikaru Nakamura (USA)	2793		2	1	1	0	2	2	2	10
2	Ian Nepomniachtchi (RUS)	2751	0		2	1	1	2	2	2	10
3	Viswanathan Anand (IND)	2786	1	0		0	2	2	2	2	9
4	Vladimir Kramnik (RUS)	2811	1	1	2		1	1	1	1	8
5	Peter Svidler (RUS)	2747	2	1	0	1		1	1	2	8
6	Boris Gelfand (ISR)	2724	0	0	0	1	1		2	1	5
7	Yannick Pelletier (SUI)	2541	0	0	0	1	1	0		1	3
8	Grigoriy Oparin (RUS)	2604	0	0	0	1	0	1	1		3

=== Blitz result ===
No	Player	Blitz rating	1	2	3	4	5	6	7	8	Points
1	Hikaru Nakamura (USA)	2793		½	½	½	½	1	1	1	5
2	Viswanathan Anand (IND)	2786	½		½	½	1	½	½	1	4½
3	Ian Nepomniachtchi (RUS)	2751	½	½		½	½	1	0	1	4
4	Peter Svidler (RUS)	2747	½	½	½		½	0	1	1	4
5	Boris Gelfand (ISR)	2724	½	0	½	½		1	½	1	4
6	Vladimir Kramnik (RUS)	2811	0	½	0	1	0		1	½	3
7	Grigoriy Oparin (RUS)	2604	0	½	1	0	½	0		½	2½
8	Yannick Pelletier (SUI)	2541	0	0	0	0	0	½	½		1

=== Combined final results ===
No	Player	Rating	Points
1	Hikaru Nakamura (USA)	2793	15.0
2	Ian Nepomniachtchi (RUS)	2751	14.0
3	Viswanathan Anand (IND)	2786	13.5
4	Peter Svidler (RUS)	2747	12.0
5	Vladimir Kramnik (RUS)	2811	11.0
6	Boris Gelfand (ISR)	2724	9.0
7	Grigoriy Oparin (RUS)	2604	5.5
8	Yannick Pelletier (SUI)	2541	4.0

== See also ==
- Zurich 1934 chess tournament
- Zurich 1953 chess tournament
