= Champions Chess Tour 2025 =

Series of chess tournaments

Details
- Duration: 16 February – 23 May 2025
- Tournaments: 2

Achievements (singles)
- Most titles: (Norway) Magnus Carlsen (2)
- Prize money leader: (Norway) Magnus Carlsen ($50,000)
- Points leader: (Norway) Magnus Carlsen (200)

The Champions Chess Tour (CCT) 2025 was a fast chess tournament circuit organized in 2025 by Chess.com. The tour started on 16 February 2025 and ended on 23 May 2025. It involved two online chess tournaments, featuring some of the world's top players who competed for a prize pool of US$300,000.

The top twelve players qualified for the Esports World Cup. (Note: The Esports World Cup is considered a separate event from the Champions Chess Tour.)

== Tour points and prize money ==
The total prize pool for each tournament was US$150,000 for each tournament, distributed as follows:

Finish	Points	Prize
1st	100	$25,000
2nd	80	$20,000
3rd	65	$15,000
4th	50	$10,000
5th (x2)	40	$8,000
7th (x2)	30	$7,000
9th (x4)	20	$6,000
13th (x4)	10	$5,000
Match Play	5	-
Play-In (16th - 30th)	3	-
Play-In (31th - 40th)	2	-
Play-In (41th - 50th)	1	-

== Tournament schedule and results ==
Champions Chess Tour tournaments
Tournament	Dates	Prize	Winner	Second (or finalist)	Third	Fourth
Chessable Masters	February 16–22	$150,000	(Norway) Magnus Carlsen	(United States) Hikaru Nakamura	(FIDE) Ian Nepomniachtchi	(Poland) Jan-Krzysztof Duda
Chess.com Classic	May 18–23	$150,000	(Norway) Magnus Carlsen	(France) Maxime Vachier-Lagrave	(United States) Hikaru Nakamura	(Uzbekistan) Nodirbek Abdusattorov

== Standings ==
Prize money is shown in US dollars. The top twelve players qualified for the Esports World Cup.

Pos	Name	Chessable Masters	Chess.com Classic	Total Points	Prize money
1	(Norway) Magnus Carlsen	100	100	200	$50,000
2	(United States) Hikaru Nakamura	80	65	145	$35,000
3	(FIDE) Ian Nepomniachtchi	65	40	105	$23,000
4	(France) Maxime Vachier-Lagrave	5	80	85	$20,000
5	(Poland) Jan-Krzysztof Duda	50	10	60	$15,000
6	(India) Arjun Erigaisi	40	20	60	$14,000
7	(Uzbekistan) Nodirbek Abdusattorov	5	50	55	$10,000
8	(FIDE) Vladislav Artemiev	20	30	50	$13,000
9	(France) Alireza Firouzja	40	3	43	$8,000
10	(Slovenia) Vladimir Fedoseev	-	40	40	$8,000
11	(United States) Fabiano Caruana	20	20	40	$12,000
12	(China) Wei Yi	20	20	40	$12,000
13	(United States) Levon Aronian	3	30	33	$7,000
14	(FIDE) Andrey Esipenko	30	2	32	$7,000
15	(China) Yu Yangyi	30	1	31	$7,000
16	(China) Ding Liren	-	20	20	$6,000
16	(Netherlands) Anish Giri	20	0	20	$6,000
18	(India) Praggnanandhaa R	10	10	20	$10,000
19	(FIDE) Denis Lazavik	5	10	15	$5,000
20	(FIDE) Alexander Grischuk	10	3	13	$5,000
21	(United States) Sam Sevian	10	1	11	$5,000
22	(India) Gukesh D	-	10	10	$5,000
22	(United States) Wesley So	10	0	10	$5,000
24	(India) Nihal Sarin	3	5	8	$0

== Tournaments details ==
=== Chessable Masters ===
Play-offs

Round 1	Quarterfinals	Semifinals	Final	Grand Final
Winners Bracket
(Norway) Magnus Carlsen	3
Andrey Esipenko	1
(Norway) Magnus Carlsen	2.5
(China) Yu Yangyi	0.5
(United States) Wesley So	1.5
(China) Yu Yangyi	2.5
(Norway) Magnus Carlsen	2.5
(India) Arjun Erigaisi	2.5
(India) Arjun Erigaisi	2.5
Vladislav Artemiev	1.5
(India) Arjun Erigaisi	3
(China) Wei Yi	0
(India) R Praggnanandhaa	0.5
(China) Wei Yi	2.5
(Norway) Magnus Carlsen	2.5
(United States) Hikaru Nakamura	0.5
(United States) Hikaru Nakamura	2.5
Alexander Grischuk	0.5
(United States) Hikaru Nakamura	3
Ian Nepomniachtchi	0
Ian Nepomniachtchi	3
(Poland) Jan-Krzysztof Duda	1
(United States) Hikaru Nakamura	3
(France) Alireza Firouzja	2
(United States) Fabiano Caruana	2.5
(United States) Samuel Sevian	0.5
(United States) Fabiano Caruana	2	(Norway) Magnus Carlsen	2.5
(France) Alireza Firouzja	3	(United States) Hikaru Nakamura	1.5
(France) Alireza Firouzja	2.5
(Netherlands) Anish Giri	0.5
Round 1	Round 2	Round 3	Quarterfinals	Semifinals	Final
Losers Bracket	(United States) Fabiano Caruana	0
(India) Arjun Erigaisi	0
Andrey Esipenko	2	Andrey Esipenko	2
Andrey Esipenko	0.5	Ian Nepomniachtchi	2
(United States) Wesley So	1
Ian Nepomniachtchi	1.5	(United States) Hikaru Nakamura	1.5
Ian Nepomniachtchi	2
Ian Nepomniachtchi	1.5	Ian Nepomniachtchi	1.5
Vladislav Artemiev	2	Vladislav Artemiev	1
(Poland) Jan-Krzysztof Duda	0.5
(India) R Praggnanandhaa	1
(China) Wei Yi	1.5
(France) Alireza Firouzja	0
Alexander Grischuk	1	(Poland) Jan-Krzysztof Duda	1.5
(Poland) Jan-Krzysztof Duda	2	(Poland) Jan-Krzysztof Duda	2
(Poland) Jan-Krzysztof Duda	2
(China) Yu Yangyi	1
(China) Yu Yangyi	1.5
(United States) Samuel Sevian	1	(Netherlands) Anish Giri	0.5
(Netherlands) Anish Giri	2

=== Chess.com Classic ===
Play-offs

Round 1	Quarterfinals	Semifinals	Final	Grand Final
Winners Bracket
(Norway) Magnus Carlsen	2.5
(Poland) Jan-Krzysztof Duda	1.5
(Norway) Magnus Carlsen	3
(France) Maxime Vachier-Lagrave	0
(France) Maxime Vachier-Lagrave	2.5
(United States) Fabiano Caruana	1.5
(Norway) Magnus Carlsen	3
(Uzbekistan) Nodirbek Abdusattorov	1
(Uzbekistan) Nodirbek Abdusattorov	3
(FIDE) Denis Lazavik	1
(Uzbekistan) Nodirbek Abdusattorov	2.5
(China) Wei Yi	0.5
(China) Wei Yi	2.5
Vladislav Artemiev	1.5
(Norway) Magnus Carlsen	3
(United States) Hikaru Nakamura	1
(United States) Hikaru Nakamura	3
(United States) Levon Aronian	2
(United States) Hikaru Nakamura	2.5
(China) Ding Liren	0.5
(China) Ding Liren	2.5
(India) R Praggnanandhaa	1.5
(United States) Hikaru Nakamura	3
Ian Nepomniachtchi	2
(India) Gukesh Dommaraju	1
(Slovenia) Vladimir Fedoseev	3
(Slovenia) Vladimir Fedoseev	2	(Norway) Magnus Carlsen	2.5
Ian Nepomniachtchi	3	(France) Maxime Vachier-Lagrave	0.5
Ian Nepomniachtchi	2.5
(India) Arjun Erigaisi	2.5
Round 1	Round 2	Round 3	Quarterfinals	Semifinals	Final
Losers Bracket	(Slovenia) Vladimir Fedoseev	2
(Uzbekistan) Nodirbek Abdusattorov	1.5
(Poland) Jan-Krzysztof Duda	1	(United States) Fabiano Caruana	0
(Slovenia) Vladimir Fedoseev	1.5	(Slovenia) Vladimir Fedoseev	1.5
(United States) Fabiano Caruana	2
Vladislav Artemiev	0.5	(United States) Hikaru Nakamura	0.5
(China) Ding Liren	0.5
(Uzbekistan) Nodirbek Abdusattorov	0	(France) Maxime Vachier-Lagrave	1.5
(FIDE) Denis Lazavik	1	Vladislav Artemiev	1.5
(France) Maxime Vachier-Lagrave	2
Vladislav Artemiev	2
(China) Wei Yi	1.5
Ian Nepomniachtchi	1.5
(United States) Levon Aronian	2	(United States) Levon Aronian	1.5
(United States) Levon Aronian	0	(France) Maxime Vachier-Lagrave	1.5
(India) R Praggnanandhaa	1
(France) Maxime Vachier-Lagrave	2
(France) Maxime Vachier-Lagrave	2
(India) Gukesh Dommaraju	0	(India) Arjun Erigaisi	1
(India) Arjun Erigaisi	2

== Esports World Cup ==
In December 2024, Chess.com announced a partnership with the Esports World Cup Foundation to include chess in the 2025 Esports World Cup, with the Champions Chess Tour now serving as the main qualifier.
