= Sunil Weeramantry =

Sri Lankan chess player (born 1951)

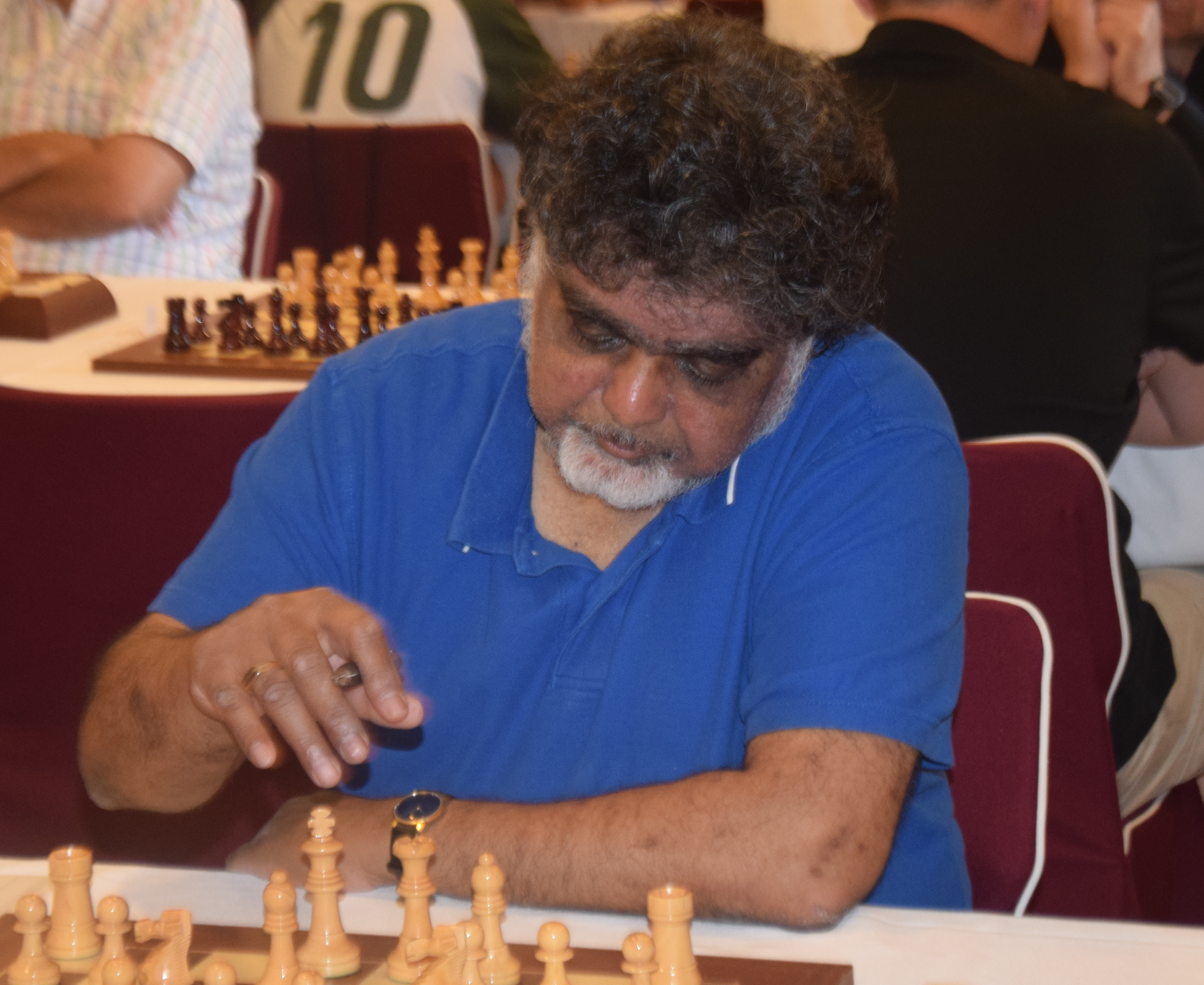
- Weeramantry at 2017 Andorra Open

Personal information
- Born: September 11, 1951 (age 74) Dominion of Ceylon
- Spouse: Carolyn Weeramantry

Chess career
- Country: Sri Lanka (until 1979, 2004–2006); United States (1979–2004, since 2006)
- Title: FIDE Master (1981)
- FIDE rating: 1909 (November 2025)
- Peak rating: 2325 (January 1980)

Sunil Weeramantry (born September 11, 1951) is a Sri Lankan and American chess player, trainer and author known for being the trainer of his stepson Hikaru Nakamura, an American grandmaster.

== Career ==
Weeramantry became a chess master at the age of 15. He represented Sri Lanka in 1978, 2004, and 2006 at the Chess Olympiad. He won the New York State Chess Championship in 1975 and again in 2001. He was inducted into the New York State Chess Hall of Fame in 1996.

Weeramantry started his chess teaching career in 1979 at Hunter College Campus Schools in Upper Manhattan. To mark the program’s 40th anniversary, in 2019 Sunil was recognized with proclamations from New York State Senator Elizabeth Krueger and New York State Governor Andrew Cuomo.

Sunil developed chess programs for White Plains Public Schools beginning in 1984. He founded the National Scholastic Chess Foundation in 1990 and rolled his schools' programs into the new foundation. Since then, the NSCF has grown to offer more than 130 classes each week in dozens of schools and communities across New York, Connecticut, Pennsylvania and Florida.

Sunil is also one of the most successful chess coaches in the United States. He has coached over 200 individual and team champions in national and international scholastic tournaments.

Sunil served as the chairman of the United States Chess Federation's committee on Chess in Education. He has been an appointed member of the USCF Scholastic Committee from 1986 to the present and has served multiple two-year terms as the committee chair. He has received several awards from US Chess in recognition of his service, including the 2020 Distinguished Service Award. In 2004, he was named the "Chess educator of the year" by University of Texas at Dallas.

=== Writing ===
Weeramantry is also a chess author; with Ed Eusebi he co-authored Best Lessons of a Chess Coach by Random House (1993). This book was extensively re-written and expanded with new content and published as Best Lessons of a Chess Coach - Extended Edition by Mongoose Press (2020). Great Moves: Learning Chess Through History, (Mongoose Press, 2017) is another work he has co-authored along with Alan Abrams and Robert McLellan. The book, for middle school students through adults, teaches chess concepts in context with chess history and world history.

== Honors ==
For his work in scholastic chess, Sunil Weeramantry received the Meritorious Service Award from US Chess in 1986 and 2004, and the Scholastic Service Award in 1998. In 2005, Weeramantry was named Chess Educator of the Year by the University of Texas at Dallas In 2022, Sunil received the USCF’s Distinguished Service Award.

The FM Sunil Weeramantry National Blitz Tournament of State Champions, an annual national-championship chess tournament run by US Chess, was named in his honor in 2020.
