= Grand Chess Tour 2016 =

Chess tournament series in 2016

Grand Chess Tour
- 2016
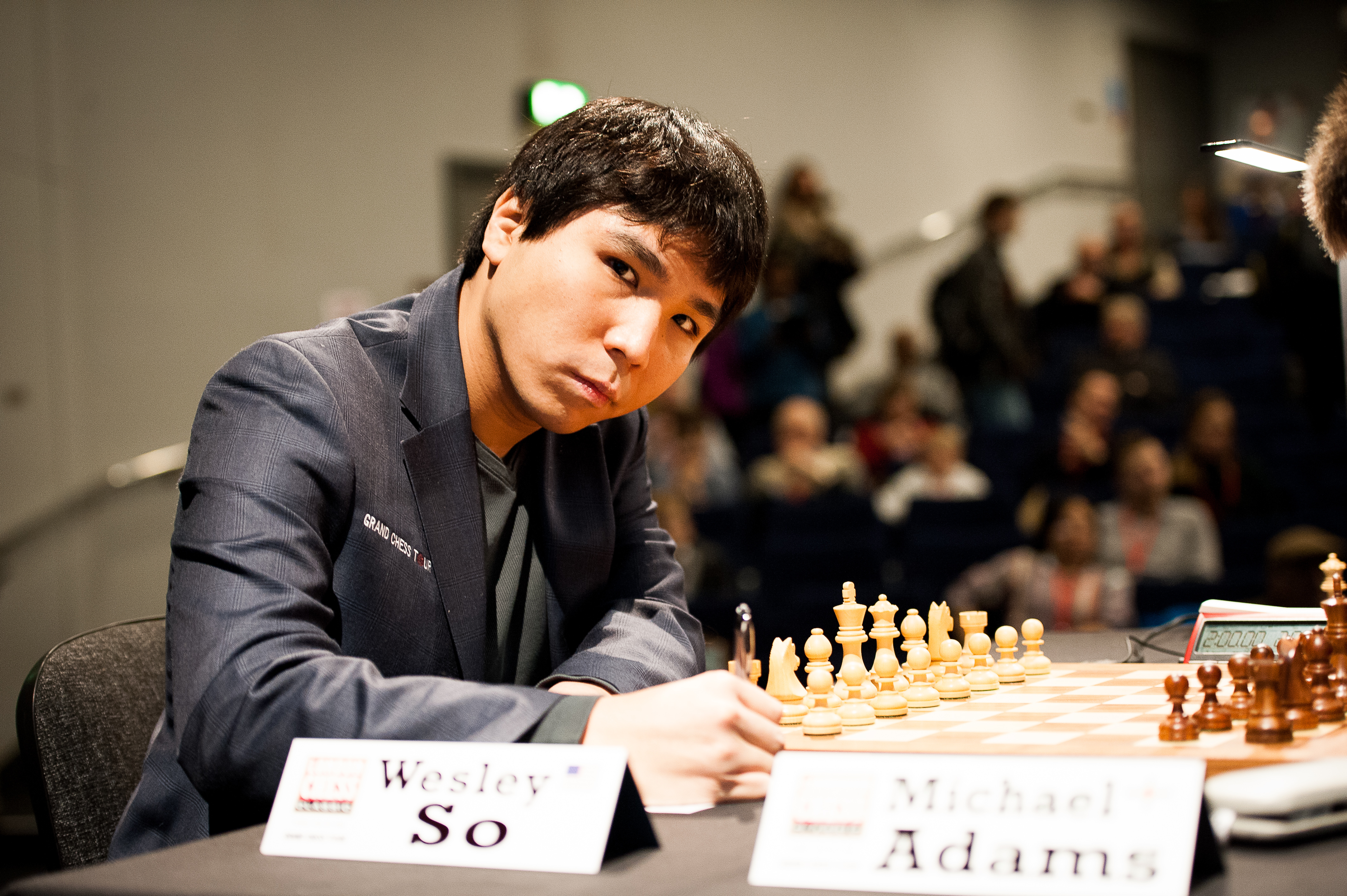
- 2016 Grand Chess Tour winner Wesley So.

Tournament information
- Dates: 9 June–18 December 2016
- Host(s): Paris; Leuven; St. Louis; London

Final positions
- Champion: (United States) Wesley So
- Runner-up: (United States) Hikaru Nakamura
- 3rd place: (United States) Fabiano Caruana

Tournament statistics
- Most tournament titles: (United States) Wesley So (2)
- Prize money leader: (United States) Wesley So ($295,000)
- Points leader: (United States) Wesley So (36)

Grand Chess Tour 2016 was a second edition of Grand Chess Tour, a series of chess tournaments, that took place from June to December 2016. It consisted of four tournaments and was won by Wesley So.

On January 6, 2016, the Grand Chess Tour saw the withdrawal of Norway Chess, one of three tournaments that were parts of the tour, along with Sinquefield Cup and London Chess Classic. The reason was different views on the funding issue. However, on February 11, Grand Chess Tour announced an inclusion of two fast chess events in Paris and Leuven.

== Format ==
The tour consisted of four events, two fast chess and two classical chess events, with each tournament having one wildcard. Eegular tour players were scheduled to participate in every event, with the exception of Viswanathan Anand, with three best results going into account. The point system was as follows:

Place	Points
1st	12/13*
2nd	10
3rd	8
4th	7
5th	6
6th	5
7th	4
8th	3
9th	2
10th	1

== Lineup ==
2016 Grand Chess Tour included nine participants. Among notable absentees were incumbent World Chess Champion Magnus Carlsen and World Chess Championship 2016 challenger Sergey Karjakin. The roster was selected based on several criteria, including top-three finish in previous tour, average rating for 2015 and personal invitation.

Player	Country	Rating (April 2016)	Qualification
Anish Giri	Netherlands	2790	Runner-up of 2015 Grand Chess Tour
Levon Aronian	Armenia	2784	Third place in 2015 Grand Chess Tour
Veselin Topalov	Bulgaria	2754	Average rating for 2015
Viswanathan Anand	India	2770	Average rating for 2015
Fabiano Caruana	United States	2795	Average rating for 2015
Hikaru Nakamura	United States	2787	Average rating for 2015
Vladimir Kramnik	Russia	2801	Average rating for 2015
Maxime Vachier-Lagrave	France	2788	Wildcard
Wesley So	United States	2773	Replacement for Magnus Carlsen

== Schedule and results ==
Dates	Tournament	Host city	Winner
June 9-12	Paris Grand Chess Tour	Paris	Hikaru Nakamura
June 17-20	Your Next Move	Leuven	Magnus Carlsen (WC)
August 5-16	Sinquefield Cup	St. Louis	Wesley So
December 9-18	London Chess Classic	London	Wesley So

== Tournaments ==
=== Paris Grand Chess Tour ===
Paris Grand Chess Tour was the first event of 2016 edition, which was won by Hikaru Nakamura. Viswanathan Anand declined his invitation due to him playing in tournament in León, Spain on the same time, and thus, Laurent Fressinet was given the additional wildcard.

2016 Paris GCT, June 9–12 Paris, France
	Player	Rapid	Blitz	Total	TB	Tour Points	Prize money
1	Hikaru Nakamura (USA)	14	11½	25½		13	$37,500
2	Magnus Carlsen (NOR)	13	11½	24½		WC (10)	$30,000
3	Maxime Vachier-Lagrave (FRA)	11	11	22		8	$15,000
4	Wesley So (USA)	11	8½	19½		7	$15,000
5	Levon Aronian (ARM)	9	10	19		6	$15,000
6	Anish Giri (NED)	9	9	18		5	$7,500
7	Vladimir Kramnik (RUS)	10	5½	15½		4	$7,500
8	Fabiano Caruana (USA)	4	10	14		3	$7,500
9	Veselin Topalov (BUL)	4	8	12		2	$7,500
10	Laurent Fressinet (FRA)	5	5	10		WC (1)	$7,500

Paris GCT Rapid, June 9-10
	Player	Rating	1	2	3	4	5	6	7	8	9	10	Points
1	Hikaru Nakamura (USA)	2846		1	1	2	1	1	2	2	2	2	14
2	Magnus Carlsen (NOR)	2878	1		0	2	2	1	2	1	2	2	13
3	Wesley So (USA)	2652	1	2		0	1	1	2	2	1	1	11
4	Maxime Vachier-Lagrave (FRA)	2784	0	0	2		2	1	1	1	2	2	11
5	Vladimir Kramnik (RUS)	2799	1	0	1	0		1	1	2	2	2	10
6	Anish Giri (NED)	2738	1	1	1	1	1		1	2	0	1	9
7	Levon Aronian (ARM)	2739	0	0	0	1	1	1		2	2	2	9
8	Laurent Fressinet (FRA)	2695	0	1	0	1	0	0	0		1	2	5
9	Veselin Topalov (BUL)	2771	0	0	1	0	0	2	0	1		0	4
10	Fabiano Caruana (USA)	2829	0	0	1	0	0	1	0	0	2		4

Paris GCT Blitz, June 11-12
	Player	Rating	1	2	3	4	5	6	7	8	9	10	Points
1	Magnus Carlsen (NOR)	2915		1 1	½ ½	½ 0	1 0	1 0	½ 1	½ 0	1 1	1 1	11½
2	Hikaru Nakamura (USA)	2883	0 0		½ 0	1 ½	½ ½	1 1	1 ½	1 ½	½ 1	1 1	11½
3	Maxime Vachier-Lagrave (FRA)	2871	½ ½	½ 1		1 1	½ 1	½ ½	½ ½	0 ½	0 1	1 ½	10½
4	Fabiano Caruana (USA)	2665	½ 1	0 ½	0 0		0 0	1 0	1 0	1 1	1 1	1 1	10
5	Levon Aronian (ARM)	2798	0 1	½ ½	½ 0	1 1		½ ½	½ ½	1 ½	½ ½	½ ½	10
6	Anish Giri (NED)	2822	0 1	0 0	½ ½	0 1	½ ½		½ 0	1 0	1 ½	1 1	9
7	Wesley So (USA)	2726	½ 0	0 ½	½ ½	0 1	½ ½	½ 1		½ ½	0 1	½ ½	8½
8	Veselin Topalov (BUL)	2644	½ 1	0 ½	1 ½	0 0	0 ½	0 1	½ ½		½ 1	0 ½	8
9	Vladimir Kramnik (RUS)	2841	0 0	½ 0	1 0	0 0	½ ½	0 ½	1 0	½ 0		1 0	5½
10	Laurent Fressinet (FRA)	2630	0 0	0 0	0 ½	0 0	½ ½	0 0	½ ½	1 ½	0 1		5

=== Your Next Move ===
2016 Your Next Move GCT, June 17–20 Leuven, Belgium
	Player	Rapid	Blitz	Total	TB	Tour Points	Prize money
1	Magnus Carlsen (NOR)	12	11	23		WC (13)	$37,500
2	Wesley So (USA)	11	9½	20½		10	$30,000
3	Levon Aronian (ARM)	10	10	20		8	$15,000
4	Viswanathan Anand (IND)	10	9½	19½		7	$15,000
5	Fabiano Caruana (USA)	9	8½	17½		6	$15,000
6	Maxime Vachier-Lagrave (FRA)	8	9	17		5	$7,500
7	Hikaru Nakamura (USA)	7	9½	16½		4	$7,500
8	Vladimir Kramnik (RUS)	7	9	16		2.5	$7,500
9	Anish Giri (NED)	8	8	16		2.5	$7,500
10	Veselin Topalov (BUL)	8	5½	13½		1	$7,500

Leuven GCT Rapid, June 17–18
	Player	Rating	1	2	3	4	5	6	7	8	9	10	Points
1	Magnus Carlsen (NOR)	2878		1	2	2	0	1	2	2	0	2	12
2	Wesley So (USA)	2652	1		1	1	2	1	1	2	1	1	11
3	Viswanathan Anand (IND)	2795	0	1		1	1	2	2	2	1	0	10
4	Levon Aronian (ARM)	2739	0	1	1		2	1	2	0	2	1	10
5	Fabiano Caruana (USA)	2829	2	0	1	0		1	1	2	0	2	9
6	Maxime Vachier-Lagrave (FRA)	2784	1	1	0	1	1		0	1	1	2	8
7	Anish Giri (NED)	2738	0	1	0	0	1	2		1	2	1	8
8	Veselin Topalov (BUL)	2771	0	0	0	2	0	1	1		2	2	8
9	Hikaru Nakamura (USA)	2846	2	1	1	0	2	1	0	0		0	7
10	Vladimir Kramnik (RUS)	2799	0	1	2	1	0	0	1	0	2		7

Leuven GCT Blitz, June 19–20
	Player	Rating	1	2	3	4	5	6	7	8	9	10	Points
1	Magnus Carlsen (NOR)	2915		½ ½	½ 1	½ ½	1 ½	1 ½	0 1	0 1	½ 0	1 1	11
2	Levon Aronian (ARM)	2798	½ ½		½ 1	½ ½	1 ½	0 ½	½ ½	1 0	½ ½	1 ½	10
3	Viswanathan Anand (IND)	2764	½ 0	½ 0		½ 1	½ ½	½ ½	1 1	0 ½	½ ½	½ 1	9½
4	Hikaru Nakamura (USA)	2883	½ ½	½ ½	½ 0		0 ½	½ ½	1 0	½ 1	1 ½	½ 1	9½
5	Wesley So (USA)	2726	0 ½	0 ½	½ ½	1 ½		0 0	1 ½	1 ½	½ ½	1 1	9½
6	Vladimir Kramnik (RUS)	2841	0 ½	1 ½	½ ½	½ ½	1 1		0 0	1 0	½ 1	½ 0	9
7	Maxime Vachier-Lagrave (FRA)	2871	1 0	½ ½	0 0	0 1	0 ½	1 1		1 ½	½ ½	½ ½	9
8	Fabiano Caruana (USA)	2665	1 0	0 1	1 ½	½ 0	0 ½	0 1	0 ½		1 ½	0 1	8½
9	Anish Giri (NED)	2822	½ 1	½ ½	½ ½	0 ½	½ ½	½ 0	½ ½	0 ½		0 1	8
10	Veselin Topalov (BUL)	2644	0 0	0 ½	½ 0	½ 0	0 0	½ 1	½ ½	1 0	1 0		6

=== Sinquefield Cup ===
Vladimir Kramnik has withdrawn due to health issues and was replaced by Peter Svidler.

4th Sinquefield Cup, 4–16 August 2016, St. Louis, Missouri, United States, Category XXII (2778.6)
	Player	Rating	1	2	3	4	5	6	7	8	9	10	Points	TPR	Tour Points
1	Wesley So (USA)	2771		½	1	½	½	1	½	½	½	½	5½	2859	13
2	Levon Aronian (ARM)	2792	½		½	½	½	1	0	½	1	½	5	2820	7.75
3	Veselin Topalov (BUL)	2761	0	½		½	½	½	½	1	1	½	5	2823	7.75
4	Viswanathan Anand (IND)	2770	½	½	½		½	½	1	½	½	½	5	2822	7.75
5	Fabiano Caruana (USA)	2807	½	½	½	½		½	½	½	½	1	5	2818	7.75
6	Hikaru Nakamura (USA)	2791	0	0	½	½	½		½	1	½	1	4½	2777	4.5
7	Maxime Vachier-Lagrave (FRA)	2819	½	1	½	0	½	½		½	½	½	4½	2774	4.5
8	Ding Liren (CHN)	2755	½	½	0	½	½	0	½		1	½	4	2738	WC (3)
9	Peter Svidler (RUS)	2751	½	0	0	½	½	½	½	0		1	3½	2701	WC (2)
10	Anish Giri (NED)	2769	½	½	½	½	0	0	½	½	0		3	2654	1

=== London Chess Classic ===
8th London Chess Classic, 9–18 December 2016, London, England, Category XXII (2785)
	Player	Rating	1	2	3	4	5	6	7	8	9	10	Points	TPR	Tour Points
1	Wesley So (USA)	2794		½	1	½	½	½	½	½	1	1	6	2909	13
2	Fabiano Caruana (USA)	2823	½		1	½	½	½	½	½	½	1	5½	2861	10
3	Hikaru Nakamura (USA)	2779	0	0		1	½	½	1	½	½	1	5	2829	7
4	Viswanathan Anand (IND)	2779	½	½	0		½	½	1	½	½	1	5	2829	7
5	Vladimir Kramnik (RUS)	2809	½	½	½	½		½	½	½	½	1	5	2826	7
6	Anish Giri (NED)	2771	½	½	½	½	½		½	½	½	½	4½	2787	5
7	Maxime Vachier-Lagrave (FRA)	2804	½	½	0	0	½	½		1	½	½	4	2740	3
8	Levon Aronian (ARM)	2785	½	½	½	½	½	½	0		1	0	4	2742	3
9	Michael Adams (ENG)	2748	0	½	½	½	½	½	½	0		1	4	2746	WC (3)
10	Veselin Topalov (BUL)	2760	0	0	0	0	0	½	½	1	0		2	2568	1

== Standings ==
	Player	Paris	Leuven	Sinquefield	London	Total points	Prize money
1	Wesley So (United States)	(7)	10	13	13	36	$295,000
2	Hikaru Nakamura (United States)	13	(4)	4.5	7	24.5	$144,166
3	Fabiano Caruana (United States)	(3)	6	7.75	10	23.75	$108,750
T-4	Levon Aronian (Armenia)	6	8	7.75	(3)	21.75	$81,250
T-4	Viswanathan Anand (India)	—N/a	7	7.75	7	21.75	$82,916
6	Maxime Vachier-Lagrave (France)	8	5	4.5	(3)	17.5	$55,000
7	Vladimir Kramnik (Russia)	4	2.5	—N/a	7	13.5	$46,666
8	Anish Giri (Netherlands)	5	2.5	(1)	5	12.5	$50,000
9	Veselin Topalov (Bulgaria)	2	(1)	7.75	1	10.75	$66,250
	Magnus Carlsen (Norway)	10	13	—N/a	—N/a	23	$67,500
	Ding Liren (China)	—N/a	—N/a	3	—N/a	3	$15,000
	Michael Adams (England)	—N/a	—N/a	—N/a	3	3	$15,000
	Peter Svidler (Russia)	—N/a	—N/a	2	—N/a	2	$15,000
	Laurent Fressinet (France)	1	—N/a	—N/a	—N/a	1	$7,500
