= Grand Chess Tour 2017 =

Chess tournaments circuit

Grand Chess Tour
- 2017
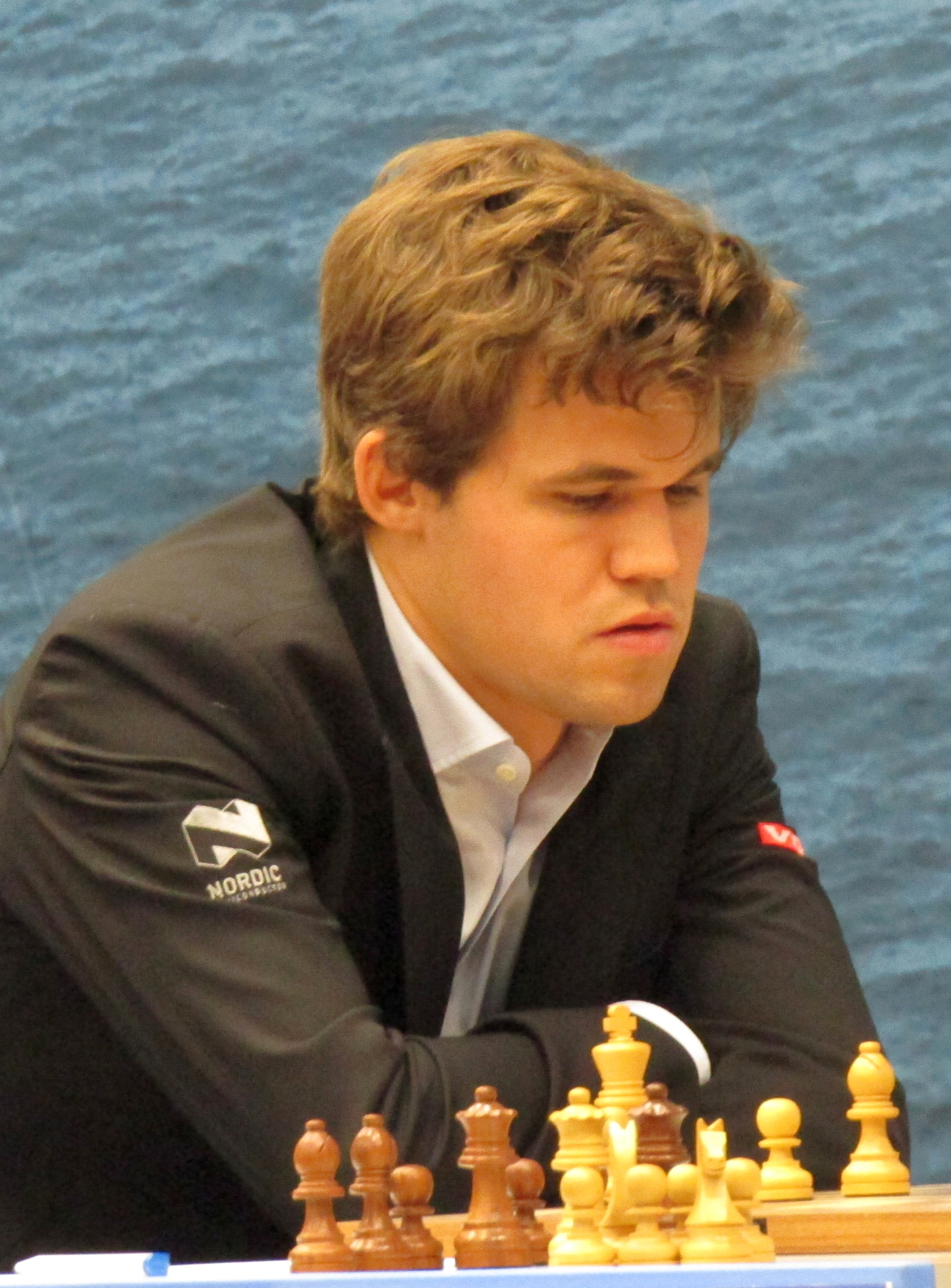
- 2017 Grand Chess Tour winner Magnus Carlsen.

Tournament information
- Dates: 12 June–21 December 2017
- Host(s): Paris; Leuven; St. Louis; London

Final positions
- Champion: (Norway) Magnus Carlsen
- Runner-up: (France) Maxime Vachier-Lagrave
- 3rd place: (Armenia) Levon Aronian

Tournament statistics
- Most tournament titles: (Norway) Magnus Carlsen (2)
- Prize money leader: (Norway) Magnus Carlsen ($245,417)
- Points leader: (Norway) Magnus Carlsen (41)

Grand Chess Tour 2017 was a circuit of chess tournaments, which was the third edition of Grand Chess Tour. It took place from June 21 to December 12, 2017, and was won by reigning World Chess Champion Magnus Carlsen.

== Format ==
The tour consisted of five events, including three fast chess and two classical events. Scoring system looked as follows:

Place	Points
1st	12/13*
2nd	10
3rd	8
4th	7
5th	6
6th	5
7th	4
8th	3
9th	2
10th	1

== Lineup ==
The tour consisted of nine regular players, who were selected to participate based on different criteria, including performance in previous edition, average rating for last twelve months, URS rating and invitation by organizers. Almost all invitees accepted, with only exception being former world champion Vladimir Kramnik, who refused to participate due to busy schedule.

Player	Country	Rating (January 2017)	Qualification method
Wesley So	United States	2808	Winner of Grand Chess Tour 2016
Hikaru Nakamura	United States	2785	Runner-up of Grand Chess Tour 2016
Fabiano Caruana	United States	2827	Third place in Grand Chess Tour 2016
Magnus Carlsen	Norway	2840	Average FIDE rating
Maxime Vachier-Lagrave	France	2796	Average FIDE rating
Ian Nepomniachtchi	Russia	2767	URS
Sergey Karjakin	Russia	2785	URS
Viswanathan Anand	India	2786	Wildcard
Levon Aronian	Armenia	2780	Replacement for Vladimir Kramnik

== Schedule and results ==
Dates	Tournament	Host city	Winner
June 21-25	Paris Rapid and Blitz	Paris	Magnus Carlsen
June 28-July 27	Your Next Move	Leuven	Magnus Carlsen
August 1-17	Sinquefield Cup	St. Louis	Maxime Vachier-Lagrave
August 13-17	Saint Louis Rapid and Blitz	St. Louis	Levon Aronian
December 1-17	London Chess Classic	London	Fabiano Caruana

== Tournaments ==
=== Paris ===
2017 Grand Chess Tour opened with Paris Rapid and Blitz event. It was won by Magnus Carlsen, who defeated Maxime Vachier-Lagrave on tie-break.

2017 Paris GCT, June 21–25 Paris, France
	Player	Rapid	Blitz	Total	TB	Tour Points	Prize money
1	Magnus Carlsen (NOR)	14	10	24	1½	12	$31,250
2	Maxime Vachier-Lagrave (FRA)	11	13	24	½	10	$31,250
3	Hikaru Nakamura (USA)	12	11	23		8	$20,000
4	Alexander Grischuk (RUS)	13	9	22		WC (7)	$15,000
5	Shakhriyar Mamedyarov (AZE)	11	9	20		WC (6)	$12,500
6	Sergey Karjakin (RUS)	8	10	18		5	$10,000
7	Wesley So (USA)	9	6	15		4	$7,500
8	Fabiano Caruana (USA)	3	11	14		3	$7,500
9	Veselin Topalov (BUL)	5	6½	11½		WC (2)	$7,500
10	Étienne Bacrot (FRA)	4	4½	8½		WC (1)	$7,500

Paris GCT Rapid, June 21–23
	Player	Rating	1	2	3	4	5	6	7	8	9	10	Points
1	Magnus Carlsen (NOR)	2896		1	1	2	2	2	1	2	2	1	14
2	Alexander Grischuk (RUS)	2822	1		0	1	2	1	2	2	2	2	13
3	Hikaru Nakamura (USA)	2796	1	2		0	1	1	1	2	2	2	12
4	Maxime Vachier-Lagrave (FRA)	2770	0	1	2		0	1	2	2	2	1	11
5	Shakhriyar Mamedyarov (AZE)	2825	0	0	1	2		1	2	2	1	2	11
6	Wesley So (USA)	2759	0	1	1	1	1		0	1	2	2	9
7	Sergey Karjakin (RUS)	2773	1	0	1	0	0	2		1	2	1	8
8	Veselin Topalov (BUL)	2715	0	0	0	0	0	1	1		1	2	5
9	Étienne Bacrot (FRA)	2710	0	0	0	0	1	0	0	1		2	4
10	Fabiano Caruana (USA)	2752	1	0	0	1	0	0	1	0	0		3

Paris GCT Blitz, June 24–25
	Player	Rating	1	2	3	4	5	6	7	8	9	10	Points
1	Maxime Vachier-Lagrave (FRA)	2825		½ 1	0 ½	0 ½	1 1	½ ½	1 1	1 ½	1 1	1 1	13
2	Hikaru Nakamura (USA)	2865	½ 0		1 ½	1 1	½ 1	½ ½	1 0	½ 1	1 0	1 0	11
3	Fabiano Caruana (USA)	2800	1 ½	0 ½		1 1	0 1	½ 0	1 0	1 0	1 1	½ 1	11
4	Sergey Karjakin (RUS)	2791	1 ½	0 0	0 0		½ 1	1 ½	½ 1	½ ½	1 1	1 0	10
5	Magnus Carlsen (NOR)	2914	0 0	½ 0	1 0	½ 0		0 ½	1 ½	1 1	1 1	1 1	10
6	Alexander Grischuk (RUS)	2813	½ ½	½ ½	½ 1	0 ½	1 ½		½ 0	0 1	½ 0	1 ½	9
7	Shakhriyar Mamedyarov (AZE)	2772	0 0	0 1	0 1	½ 0	0 ½	½ 1		½ 1	½ ½	1 1	9
8	Veselin Topalov (BUL)	2710	0 ½	½ 0	0 1	½ ½	0 0	1 0	½ 0		½ 0	½ 1	6½
9	Wesley So (USA)	2791	0 0	0 1	0 0	0 0	0 0	½ 1	½ ½	½ 1		0 1	6
10	Étienne Bacrot (FRA)	2627	0 0	0 1	½ 0	0 1	0 0	0 ½	0 0	½ 0	1 0		5½

First place playoff
Place	Player	Rapid rating	Rapid		Score
1	Magnus Carlsen (NOR)	2896	1	½	1½
2	Maxime Vachier-Lagrave (FRA)	2770	0	½	½

=== Leuven ===
Leuven Grand Chess Tour took place from June 28 to July 2 in Leuven, Belgium. As well as previous event, it was won by Magnus Carlsen.

2017 Leuven GCT, June 28–July 2 Leuven, Belgium
	Player	Rapid	Blitz	Total	TB	Tour Points	Prize money
1	Magnus Carlsen (NOR)	11	14½	25½		13	$37,500
2	Wesley So (USA)	14	8½	22½		10	$25,000
3	Maxime Vachier-Lagrave (FRA)	12	10	22		8	$20,000
4	Anish Giri (NED)	10	10	20		WC (7)	$15,000
5	Vladimir Kramnik (RUS)	9	9½	18½		WC (5.5)	$11,250
6	Levon Aronian (ARM)	9	9½	18½		5.5	$11,250
7	Ian Nepomniachtchi (RUS)	9	9	18		4	$7,500
8	Viswanathan Anand (IND)	8	8	16		3	$7,500
9	Vasyl Ivanchuk (UKR)	7	8½	15½		WC (2)	$7,500
10	Baadur Jobava (GEO)	1	2½	3½		WC (1)	$7,500

Leuven GCT Rapid, June 28–30
	Player	Rating	1	2	3	4	5	6	7	8	9	10	Points
1	Wesley So (USA)	2759		1	2	1	1	2	2	2	1	2	14
2	Maxime Vachier-Lagrave (FRA)	2770	1		1	1	2	0	1	2	2	2	12
3	Magnus Carlsen (NOR)	2896	0	1		1	1	2	2	1	1	2	11
4	Anish Giri (NED)	2750	1	1	1		0	2	1	1	2	1	10
5	Ian Nepomniachtchi (RUS)	2819	1	0	1	2		2	1	0	0	2	9
6	Levon Aronian (ARM)	2797	0	2	0	0	0		2	2	1	2	9
7	Vladimir Kramnik (RUS)	2798	0	1	0	1	1	0		2	2	2	9
8	Viswanathan Anand (IND)	2789	0	0	1	1	2	0	0		2	2	8
9	Vasyl Ivanchuk (UKR)	2827	1	0	1	0	2	1	0	0		2	7
10	Baadur Jobava (GEO)	2649	0	0	0	1	0	0	0	0	0		1

Leuven GCT Blitz, July 1–2
	Player	Rating	1	2	3	4	5	6	7	8	9	10	Points
1	Magnus Carlsen (NOR)	2899		0 ½	1 1	½ 1	1 ½	1 1	1 1	1 ½	1 ½	1 1	14½
2	Anish Giri (NED)	2723	1 ½		½ ½	0 ½	0 ½	½ 0	1 ½	1 ½	½ ½	1 1	10
3	Maxime Vachier-Lagrave (FRA)	2890	0 0	½ ½		0 0	1 1	0 1	1 0	1 1	0 1	1 1	10
4	Vladimir Kramnik (RUS)	2760	½ 0	1 ½	1 1		½ ½	½ 0	½ ½	½ ½	½ ½	1 0	9½
5	Levon Aronian (ARM)	2786	0 ½	1 ½	0 0	½ ½		½ 1	1 0	½ ½	0 1	1 1	9½
6	Ian Nepomniachtchi (RUS)	2793	0 0	½ 1	1 0	½ 1	½ 0		1 0	0 ½	½ 1	1 ½	9
7	Vasyl Ivanchuk (UKR)	2768	0 0	0 ½	0 1	½ ½	0 1	0 1		½ ½	½ 1	½ 1	8½
8	Wesley So (USA)	2724	0 ½	0 ½	0 0	½ ½	½ ½	1 ½	½ ½		1 0	1 1	8½
9	Viswanathan Anand (IND)	2766	0 ½	½ ½	1 0	½ ½	1 0	½ 0	½ 0	0 1		1 ½	8
10	Baadur Jobava (GEO)	2734	0 0	0 0	0 0	0 1	0 0	0 ½	½ 0	0 0	0 ½		2½

=== Sinquefield Cup ===
Sinquefield Cup, 2–11 August 2017, St. Louis, Missouri, United States, Category XXII (2787.7)
	Player	Rating	1	2	3	4	5	6	7	8	9	10	Points	Wins	H2H	TPR	Tour Points
1	Maxime Vachier-Lagrave (FRA)	2789		1	½	½	½	½	½	½	1	1	6			2907	13
2	Magnus Carlsen (NOR)	2822	0		½	1	1	½	½	½	1	½	5½	3		2862	9
3	Viswanathan Anand (IND)	2783	½	½		½	½	½	1	½	½	1	5½	2		2866	9
4	Levon Aronian (ARM)	2799	½	0	½		½	½	0	1	1	1	5	3		2825	6.5
5	Sergey Karjakin (RUS)	2773	½	0	½	½		1	½	½	1	½	5	2		2828	6.5
6	Peter Svidler (RUS)	2751	½	½	½	½	0		1	½	½	½	4½			2792	WC (5)
7	Fabiano Caruana (USA)	2807	½	½	0	1	½	0		½	½	½	4			2747	4
8	Hikaru Nakamura (USA)	2792	½	½	½	0	½	½	½		½	0	3½			2709	3
9	Wesley So (USA)	2810	0	0	½	0	0	½	½	½		1	3	1	1	2665	1.5
10	Ian Nepomniachtchi (RUS)	2751	0	½	0	0	½	½	½	1	0		3	1	0	2672	1.5

=== Saint Louis Rapid and Blitz ===
The inaugural Saint Louis Rapid and Blitz was the fourth leg of 2017 Grand Chess Tour and took place in Saint Louis Chess Club from August 13 to August 19. It brought some attention from the media due to participation of former World Chess Champion Garry Kasparov, who has retired from competitive chess in 2005, 12 years prior to the event. He represented Croatia at the tournament.

2017 Saint Louis Rapid and Blitz, August 10–16 St. Louis, Missouri, United States
	Player	Rapid	Blitz	Total	TB	Tour Points	Prize money
1	Levon Aronian (ARM)	12	12½	24½		13	$37,000
2	Hikaru Nakamura (USA)	11	10½	21½		9	$22,500
3	Sergey Karjakin (RUS)	8	13½	21½		9	$22,500
4	Ian Nepomniachtchi (RUS)	10	10	20		7	$15,000
5	Fabiano Caruana (USA)	11	5½	16½		5	$10,000
6	Lê Quang Liêm (VIE)	8	8½	16½		WC (5)	$10,000
7	Leinier Domínguez (CUB)	9	7½	16½		WC (5)	$10,000
8	Garry Kasparov (CRO)	7	9	16		WC (3)	$7,500
9	Viswanathan Anand (IND)	7	7	14		2	$7,500
10	David Navara (CZE)	7	6	13		WC (1)	$7,500

Saint Louis Rapid, August 14-16
	Player	Rating	1	2	3	4	5	6	7	8	9	10	Points
1	Levon Aronian (ARM)	2794		2	1	0	2	0	2	2	2	1	12
2	Fabiano Caruana (USA)	2700	0		1	1	2	0	2	2	1	2	11
3	Hikaru Nakamura (USA)	2822	1	1		2	1	0	1	2	2	1	11
4	Ian Nepomniachtchi (RUS)	2810	2	1	0		1	1	1	1	1	2	10
5	Leinier Domínguez (CUB)	2803	0	0	1	1		2	1	2	1	1	9
6	Lê Quang Liêm (VIE)	2761	2	2	2	1	0		0	0	1	0	8
7	Sergey Karjakin (RUS)	2765	0	0	1	1	1	2		0	2	1	8
8	David Navara (CZE)	2737	0	0	0	1	0	2	2		0	2	7
9	Viswanathan Anand (IND)	2778	0	1	0	1	1	1	0	2		1	7
10	Garry Kasparov (CRO)	2812	1	0	1	0	1	2	1	0	1		7

Saint Louis Blitz, August 17–18
	Player	Rating	1	2	3	4	5	6	7	8	9	10	Points
1	Sergey Karjakin (RUS)	2807		½ ½	1 0	1 ½	½ 1	1 1	1 1	1 ½	1 0	1 1	13½
2	Levon Aronian (ARM)	2794	½ ½		½ ½	1 1	1 ½	1 1	1 1	1 ½	½ 0	0 1	12½
3	Hikaru Nakamura (USA)	2868	0 1	½ ½		½ ½	½ 0	½ 0	1 0	½ 1	1 1	1 1	10½
4	Ian Nepomniachtchi (RUS)	2787	0 ½	0 0	½ ½		½ ½	½ 1	1 1	½ 0	1 ½	1 1	10
5	Garry Kasparov (CRO)	2812	½ 0	0 ½	½ 1	½ ½		0 ½	1 1	½ ½	½ ½	0 1	9
6	Lê Quang Liêm (VIE)	2747	0 0	0 0	½ 1	½ 0	1 ½		½ ½	½ ½	0 1	1 1	8½
7	Leinier Domínguez (CUB)	2796	0 0	0 0	0 1	0 0	0 0	½ ½		½ 1	1 1	1 1	7½
8	Viswanathan Anand (IND)	2756	0 ½	0 ½	½ 0	½ 1	½ ½	½ ½	½ 0		½ ½	½ 0	7
9	David Navara (CZE)	2748	0 1	½ 1	0 0	0 ½	½ ½	1 0	0 0	½ ½		0 0	6
10	Fabiano Caruana (USA)	2806	0 0	1 0	0 0	0 0	1 0	0 0	0 0	½ 1	1 1		5½

=== London ===
9th London Chess Classic, 1–11 December 2017, London, England, Category XXII (2779)
	Player	Rating	1	2	3	4	5	6	7	8	9	10	Points	TB	Wins	H2H	TPR	Tour Points	Place
1	Fabiano Caruana (USA)	2799		½	½	½	½	½	½	1	1	1	6	2½			2901	12	1
2	Ian Nepomniachtchi (RUS)	2729	½		1	½	½	½	½	½	1	1	6	1½			2909	10	2
3	Magnus Carlsen (NOR)	2837	½	0		½	½	½	1	½	½	1	5		2		2815	7	3
4	Maxime Vachier-Lagrave (FRA)	2789	½	½	½		½	½	½	1	½	½	5		1	½	2820	7	4–5
5	Wesley So (USA)	2788	½	½	½	½		½	½	½	1	½	5		1	½	2820	7	4–5
6	Hikaru Nakamura (USA)	2781	½	½	½	½	½		½	½	½	½	4½				2778	5	6
7	Levon Aronian (ARM)	2805	½	½	0	½	½	½		½	½	½	4				2733	4	7
8	Sergey Karjakin (RUS)	2760	0	½	½	0	½	½	½		½	½	3½				2701	3	8
9	Viswanathan Anand (IND)	2782	0	0	½	½	0	½	½	½		½	3		0	½	2653	1.5	9–10
10	Michael Adams (ENG)	2715	0	0	0	½	½	½	½	½	½		3		0	½	2661	WC (1.5)	9–10

First place playoff
Place	Player	Rapid rating	Blitz rating	Rapid		Blitz		Score
1	Fabiano Caruana (USA)	2751	2804	½	½	½	1	2½
2	Ian Nepomniachtchi (RUS)	2780	2810	½	½	½	0	1½

== Standings ==
	Player	Paris	Leuven	Sinquefield	St. Louis	London	Total points	Prize money
1	Magnus Carlsen (Norway)	12	13	9	—N/a	7	41	$245,417
2	Maxime Vachier-Lagrave (France)	10	8	13	—N/a	7	38	$207,917
3	Levon Aronian (Armenia)	—N/a	5.5	6.5	13	4	29	$91,250
4	Hikaru Nakamura (United States)	8	—N/a	3	9	5	25	$77,500
5	Fabiano Caruana (United States)	3	—N/a	4	5	12	24	$95,000
6	Sergey Karjakin (Russia)	5	—N/a	6.5	9	3	23.5	$75,000
T-7	Wesley So (United States)	4	10	1.5	—N/a	7	22.5	$79,167
T-7	Ian Nepomniachtchi (Russia)	—N/a	4	1.5	7	10	22.5	$100,000
9	Viswanathan Anand (India)	—N/a	3	9	2	1.5	15.5	$75,000
	Anish Giri (Netherlands)	—N/a	7	—N/a	—N/a	—N/a	7	$15,000
	Alexander Grischuk (Russia)	7	—N/a	—N/a	—N/a	—N/a	7	$15,000
	Shakhriyar Mamedyarov (Azerbaijan)	6	—N/a	—N/a	—N/a	—N/a	6	$12,500
	Vladimir Kramnik (Russia)	—N/a	5.5	—N/a	—N/a	—N/a	5.5	$11,250
	Peter Svidler (Russia)	—N/a	—N/a	5	—N/a	—N/a	5	$20,000
	Leinier Domínguez (Cuba)	—N/a	—N/a	—N/a	5	—N/a	5	$10,000
	Lê Quang Liêm (Vietnam)	—N/a	—N/a	—N/a	5	—N/a	5	$10,000
	Garry Kasparov (Russia)	—N/a	—N/a	—N/a	3	—N/a	3	$7,500
	Vassily Ivanchuk (Ukraine)	—N/a	2	—N/a	—N/a	—N/a	2	$7,500
	Veselin Topalov (Bulgaria)	2	—N/a	—N/a	—N/a	—N/a	2	$7,500
	Michael Adams (England)	—N/a	—N/a	—N/a	—N/a	1.5	1.5	$15,000
	Étienne Bacrot (France)	1	—N/a	—N/a	—N/a	—N/a	1	$7,500
	Baadur Jobava (Georgia)	—N/a	1	—N/a	—N/a	—N/a	1	$7,500
	David Navara (Czech Republic)	—N/a	—N/a	—N/a	1	—N/a	1	$7,500
