= Grand Chess Tour 2015 =

Grand Chess Tour
- 2015
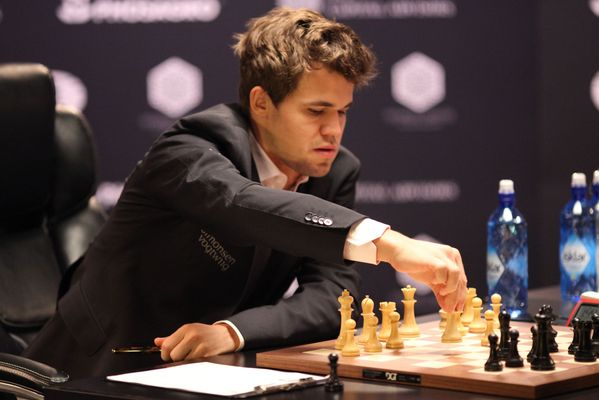
- 2015 Grand Chess Tour winner Magnus Carlsen.

Tournament information
- Dates: 15 June–14 December 2015
- Host(s): Stavanger; St. Louis; London

Final positions
- Champion: (Norway) Magnus Carlsen
- Runner-up: (Netherlands) Anish Giri
- 3rd place: (Armenia) Levon Aronian

Tournament statistics
- Prize money leader: (Norway) Magnus Carlsen ($215,000)
- Points leader: (Norway) Magnus Carlsen (26)

Grand Chess Tour 2015 was the inaugural edition of Grand Chess Tour, an annual circuit of chess tournaments. It was won by incumbent World Chess Champion Magnus Carlsen.

The Grand Chess Tour was announced on April 24, 2015, prior to the match between Garry Kasparov and Nigel Short, and was billed as "the biggest announcement in professional chess since 1988." It had three events – Norway Chess in June, Sinquefield Cup in August and London Chess Classic in December. Each tournament consisted of nine regular tour players, who were selected based on their rating, and one wildcard.

== Format ==
Scoring system was as follows:

Place	Points
1st	12/13*
2nd	10
3rd	8
4th	7
5th	6
6th	5
7th	4
8th	3
9th	2
10th	1

== Lineup ==
Eight players, including World Champion Magnus Carlsen, were selected based on their ratings in January 2015. Ninth player invited to the tour was Maxime Vachier-Lagrave. Notably, Sergey Karjakin was absent, despite him being two-time Norway Chess winner and 11th on FIDE rankings in January 2015, while No. 8 Vladimir Kramnik and No. 10 Wesley So declined their invitations.

Player	Country	Rating (January 2015)
Magnus Carlsen	Norway	2862
Fabiano Caruana	Italy (Note: Although representing Italy when the roster was announced, Fabiano Caruana has switched federations and played under the flag of the United States after Norway Chess)	2820
Alexander Grischuk	Russia	2810
Veselin Topalov	Bulgaria	2800
Viswanathan Anand	India	2797
Levon Aronian	Armenia	2797
Anish Giri	Netherlands	2784
Hikaru Nakamura	United States	2776
Maxime Vachier-Lagrave	France	2757

== Schedule and results ==
Dates	Tournament	Host city	Winner	Runner-up	Third place
June 15–26	Norway Chess	Stavanger	Veselin Topalov	Viswanathan Anand	Hikaru Nakamura
August 22–September 3	Sinquefield Cup	St. Louis	Levon Aronian	Magnus Carlsen	Hikaru Nakamura
December 4–13	London Chess Classic	London	Magnus Carlsen	Anish Giri	Maxime Vachier-Lagrave

== Tournaments ==
=== Norway Chess ===
==== Wildcard qualifier ====
EnterCard Chess Qualifier took place in Oslo, Norway on May 10–15, 2015, and determined last wildcard spot. Jon Ludvig Hammer of Norway won the tournament to qualify into the main event.

EnterCard Chess Qualifier, May 10–15, Oslo, Norway
	Player	Classical								Rapid								Total Points
	Player	Rating	1	2	3	4	5	6	Points	Rating	1	2	3	4	5	6	Points	Total Points
1	GM Jon Ludvig Hammer (NOR)	2665		1	1	2	2	2	8	2578		1	½	½	1	1	4	12
2	GM Laurent Fressinet (FRA)	2712	1		2	1	2	2	8	2707	0		½	½	1	1	3	11
3	IM Aryan Tari (NOR)	2520	1	0		1	1	1	4	2442	½	½		½	1	1	3½	7½
4	GM Nils Grandelius (SWE)	2623	0	1	1		2	1	5	2623	½	½	½		0	0	1½	6½
5	GM Curt Hansen (DEN)	2621	0	0	1	0		2	3	2621	0	0	0	1		½	1½	4½
6	GM Simen Agdestein (NOR)	2620	0	0	1	1	0		2	2575	0	0	0	1	½		1½	3½

==== Blitz tournament ====
Blitz tournament was played on June 15, 2015, to decide the pairings for the classical tournament. It was won by French grandmaster Maxime Vachier-Lagrave.

3rd Norway Chess Blitz, 15 June 2015, Stavanger, Norway
	Player	Blitz rating	1	2	3	4	5	6	7	8	9	10	Points	Black	Wins	Black wins
1	Maxime Vachier-Lagrave (FRA)	2826		0	½	1	½	1	½	1	1	1	6½			
2	Hikaru Nakamura (USA)	2883	1		½	0	½	1	0	1	1	1	6			
3	Viswanathan Anand (IND)	2767	½	½		0	0	1	1	½	1	1	5½	5	4	3
4	Magnus Carlsen (NOR)	2933	0	1	1		½	½	0	1	½	1	5½	5	4	2
5	Anish Giri (NED)	2771	½	½	1	½		0	½	½	1	1	5½	4		
6	Levon Aronian (ARM)	2816	0	0	0	½	1		½	1	1	1	5			
7	Alexander Grischuk (RUS)	2839	½	1	0	1	½	½		0	0	½	4			
8	Veselin Topalov (BUL)	2641	0	0	½	0	½	0	1		0	1	3			
9	Fabiano Caruana (ITA)	2679	0	0	0	½	0	0	1	1		0	2½			
10	Jon Ludvig Hammer (NOR)	2648	0	0	0	0	0	0	½	0	1		1½			

==== Classical tournament ====
3rd Norway Chess, 16–25 June 2015, Stavanger, Norway, Category XXII (2782)
	Player	Rating	1	2	3	4	5	6	7	8	9	10	Points	Wins	H2H	SB	TPR	Tour points
1	Veselin Topalov (BUL)	2798		½	½	0	½	1	1	1	1	1	6½				2946	13
2	Viswanathan Anand (IND)	2804	½		½	½	½	1	1	½	½	1	6	3	½	24.75	2904	10
3	Hikaru Nakamura (USA)	2802	½	½		½	1	½	½	½	1	1	6	3	½	24.50	2904	8
4	Anish Giri (NED)	2773	1	½	½		½	½	½	1	½	½	5½				2862	7
5	Fabiano Caruana (ITA)	2805	½	½	0	½		½	1	½	0	½	4	1	½	17.75	2736	6
6	Maxime Vachier-Lagrave (FRA)	2723	0	0	½	½	½		½	½	1	½	4	1	½	15.75	2745	5
7	Magnus Carlsen (NOR)	2876	0	0	½	½	0	½		1	1	0	3½	2			2691	4
8	Alexander Grischuk (RUS)	2781	0	½	½	0	½	½	0		½	1	3½	1			2702	3
9	Levon Aronian (ARM)	2780	0	½	0	½	1	0	0	½		½	3	1	½	13.00	2657	2
10	Jon Ludvig Hammer (NOR)	2677	0	0	0	½	½	½	1	0	½		3	1	½	11.75	2668	WC (1)

=== Sinquefield Cup ===
3rd Sinquefield Cup, 22 August – 3 September 2015, St. Louis, Missouri, United States, Category XXII (2794.6)
	Player	Rating	1	2	3	4	5	6	7	8	9	10	Points	Wins	H2H	SB	TPR	Tour Points
1	Levon Aronian (ARM)	2765		½	1	½	½	½	½	1	½	1	6				2923	13
2	Magnus Carlsen (NOR)	2853	½		½	1	½	0	0	1	½	1	5	3	½	21.25	2831	10
3	Hikaru Nakamura (USA)	2814	0	½		½	½	1	0	½	1	1	5	3	½	20.25	2835	8
4	Maxime Vachier-Lagrave (FRA)	2731	½	0	½		½	½	1	½	½	1	5	2			2845	7
5	Anish Giri (NED)	2793	½	½	½	½		1	½	½	½	½	5	1			2838	6
6	Alexander Grischuk (RUS)	2771	½	1	0	½	0		½	1	1	0	4½	3			2797	5
7	Veselin Topalov (BUL)	2816	½	1	1	0	½	½		0	½	½	4½	2			2792	4
8	Fabiano Caruana (USA)	2808	0	0	½	½	½	0	1		½	½	3½	1			2713	3
9	Viswanathan Anand (IND)	2816	½	½	0	½	½	0	½	½		½	3½	0			2712	2
10	Wesley So (USA)	2779	0	0	0	0	½	1	½	½	½		3				2671	WC (1)

=== London Chess Classic ===
7th London Chess Classic, 3–14 December 2015, London, England, Category XXII (2784)
	Player	Rating	1	2	3	4	5	6	7	8	9	10	Points	Wins	H2H	SB	TPR	Tour Points
1	Magnus Carlsen (NOR)	2834		½	½	½	1	½	½	1	½	½	5½	2	1	24.00	2859	12
2	Anish Giri (NED)	2784	½		½	½	½	½	½	1	½	1	5½	2	1	23.00	2864	10
3	Maxime Vachier-Lagrave (FRA)	2773	½	½		½	½	½	½	½	1	1	5½	2	1	22.75	2865	8
4	Levon Aronian (ARM)	2788	½	½	½		½	½	½	½	½	1	5				2827	7
5	Alexander Grischuk (RUS)	2747	0	½	½	½		½	½	½	1	½	4½	1			2788	6
6	Fabiano Caruana (USA)	2787	½	½	½	½	½		½	½	½	½	4½	0	½	20.25	2784	4.5
7	Michael Adams (ENG)	2737	½	½	½	½	½	½		½	½	½	4½	0	½	20.25	2789	WC (4.5)
8	Hikaru Nakamura (USA)	2793	0	0	½	½	½	½	½		1	½	4				2740	3
9	Viswanathan Anand (IND)	2796	½	½	0	½	0	½	½	0		1	3½				2703	2
10	Veselin Topalov (BUL)	2803	½	0	0	0	½	½	½	½	0		2½				2616	1

==== First place play-off ====
Semifinal			Final
			1	Magnus Carlsen (Norway)	1½
2	Anish Giri (Netherlands)	1	3	Maxime Vachier-Lagrave (France)	½
3	Maxime Vachier-Lagrave (France)	2

== Standings ==
	Player	Norway	Sinquefield	London	Total points	Prize money
1	Magnus Carlsen (Norway)	4	10	12	26	$215,000
2	Anish Giri (Netherlands)	7	6	10	23	$155,000
3	Levon Aronian (Armenia)	2	13	7	22	$145,000
4	Maxime Vachier-Lagrave (France)	5	7	8	20	$90,000
5	Hikaru Nakamura (United States)	8	8	3	19	$95,000
6	Veselin Topalov (Bulgaria)	13	4	1	18	$105,000
T-7	Alexander Grischuk (Russia)	3	5	6	14	$60,000
T-7	Viswanathan Anand (India)	10	2	2	14	$80,000
9	Fabiano Caruana (United States)	6	3	4.5	13.5	$55,000
	Michael Adams (England)	—N/a	—N/a	4.5	4.5	$20,000
	Jon Ludvig Hammer (Norway)	1	—N/a	—N/a	1	$15,000
	Wesley So (United States)	—N/a	1	—N/a	1	$15,000
