= Grand Chess Tour =

Annual circuit of chess tournaments

- Most recent season or competition: Grand Chess Tour 2026
- Classification: Men's professional Chess tour
- Sport: Chess
- Founded: 2015; 11 years ago
- First season: 2015
- Country: Worldwide
- Website: www.grandchesstour.com

The Grand Chess Tour (GCT) is a circuit of chess tournaments in which players compete for multiple prize pools. The tournaments, which vary from year to year, have included Norway Chess, the Sinquefield Cup, and the London Chess Classic.

== History ==
The Grand Chess Tour was announced on April 24, 2015, at the Saint Louis Chess Club in St. Louis, Missouri, before the "Battle of the Legends", a match between Garry Kasparov and Nigel Short. The tour was designed to promote competitive chess by including all of the top players and then-World Champion Magnus Carlsen in a single circuit. With the combination of several established tournaments, the Grand Chess Tour aimed to create a large prize pool that would be attractive to the players and media alike.

Held in 2015, the first Grand Chess Tour included three tournaments—Norway Chess, the Sinquefield Cup, and the London Chess Classic—each with the same prize fund, structure, and time controls. The overall prize pool for the first Grand Chess Tour was $1,050,000, with $300,000 for each tournament and a $150,000 prize for the top three players. Nine "standard" players competed in each tournament, with a tenth wildcard player selected by the organizing committee of each tournament. Players earn tour points based on their performance at each event. The top three players who accumulate the most tour points across all events receive extra prize money from the Grand Chess Tour prize fund and automatic invitations to the following year's Grand Chess Tour. Wildcard players receive tour points for any tournaments in which they participate.

In 2016, there were eight standard players and two wildcards per event.

The point breakdown and prize money for each classical tournament is:

Place	Points	Event standings	Overall standings
1st	13/12*	$75,000	$75,000
2nd	10	$50,000	$50,000
3rd	8	$40,000	$25,000
4th	7	$30,000	
5th	6	$25,000	
6th	5	$20,000	
7th	4	$15,000	
8th	3	$15,000	
9th	2	$15,000	
10th	1	$15,000	

- If a player shares 1st place and wins the tiebreak (*), they earn 12 points rather than the 13 points awarded to an outright winner.
- Rapid and blitz events have the prize money halved.

== Winners ==
#	Year	Winner
1	2015	Magnus Carlsen (Norway)
2	2016	Wesley So (United States)
3	2017	Magnus Carlsen (Norway)
4	2018	Hikaru Nakamura (United States)
5	2019	Ding Liren (China)
6	2021	Wesley So (United States)
7	2022	Alireza Firouzja (France)
8	2023	Fabiano Caruana (United States)
9	2024	Alireza Firouzja (France)
10	2025	Fabiano Caruana (United States)
11	2026	R Praggnanandhaa (India)

== Grand Chess Tour 2015 ==
In 2015, the Grand Chess Tour invited the top-10 players in the world ranked by the January 2015 FIDE rating list. Maxime Vachier-Lagrave, the 11th ranked player in February 2015, was invited as the ninth player to compete after 8th ranked Vladimir Kramnik and 10th ranked Wesley So declined to participate. Jon Ludvig Hammer was selected to participate in the 2015 Norway Chess Tournament after qualifying through a wildcard tournament. Wesley So and Michael Adams were selected to participate in the Sinquefield Cup and the London Chess Classic, respectively.

The results of the 2015 Grand Chess Tour. Tour points in bold indicate a tournament win.

	Player	Norway	Sinquefield	London	Total points	Prize money
1	**Magnus Carlsen (Norway)**	4	10	**12**	**26**	$215,000
2	Anish Giri (Netherlands)	7	6	10	**23**	$155,000
3	Levon Aronian (Armenia)	2	**13**	7	**22**	$145,000
4	Maxime Vachier-Lagrave (France)	5	7	8	**20**	$90,000
5	Hikaru Nakamura (United States)	8	8	3	**19**	$95,000
6	Veselin Topalov (Bulgaria)	**13**	4	1	**18**	$105,000
T-7	Alexander Grischuk (Russia)	3	5	6	**14**	$60,000
T-7	Viswanathan Anand (India)	10	2	2	**14**	$80,000
9	Fabiano Caruana (United States) (Note: Although representing Italy when the roster was announced, Fabiano Caruana has switched federations and played under the flag of the United States after Norway Chess)	6	3	4.5	**13.5**	$55,000
	Michael Adams (England)	—N/a	—N/a	4.5	4.5	$20,000
	Jon Ludvig Hammer (Norway)	1	—N/a	—N/a	1	$15,000
	Wesley So (United States)	—N/a	1	—N/a	1	$15,000

== Grand Chess Tour 2016 ==
On January 6, 2016, the Altibox Norway Chess event announced it would not be part of the Grand Chess Tour in 2016.

On February 11, 2016, the GCT announced it was adding two rapid/blitz tournaments for 2016, sponsored by Colliers International France (Paris), and Your Next Move (Leuven).

For 2016, an initial roster of eight players was created based upon the rules published on the GCT website. The Initial Roster consisted of the three top finishers in the 2015 GCT and the next five highest players by rating will be the average of each monthly FIDE supplement from February through December inclusive, as well as the live ratings after the 2015 London Chess Classic. Maxime Vachier-Lagrave was subsequently added to the roster as the GCT Wild Card Player for all 4 events.

World Champion Magnus Carlsen declined participation in the two classic events but competed as a wild card in the rapid/blitz tournaments held in both Paris and Leuven. All other players accepted the invitations for all four tournaments with the exception of Viswanathan Anand who declined the invitation to the Paris tournament. Since GCT Tour Points were based on the best three tournament results, Anand remained eligible for the overall tour prizes. For the Sinquefield Cup, Vladimir Kramnik had to withdraw due to health issues and was replaced by Peter Svidler.

The wildcards were as follows:

Player	Event
Magnus Carlsen (Norway)	Paris & Leuven
Laurent Fressinet (France)	Paris
Ding Liren (China)	St. Louis
Peter Svidler (Russia)	St. Louis
Michael Adams (England)	London

The results of the 2016 Grand Chess Tour. Tour points in bold indicate a tournament win.

	Player	Paris	Leuven	Sinquefield	London	Total points	Prize money
1	**Wesley So (United States)**	(7)	10	**13**	**13**	**36**	$295,000
2	Hikaru Nakamura (United States)	**13**	(4)	4.5	7	**24.5**	$144,166
3	Fabiano Caruana (United States)	(3)	6	7.75	10	**23.75**	$108,750
T-4	Levon Aronian (Armenia)	6	8	7.75	(3)	**21.75**	$81,250
T-4	Viswanathan Anand (India)	—N/a	7	7.75	7	**21.75**	$82,916
6	Maxime Vachier-Lagrave (France)	8	5	4.5	(3)	**17.5**	$55,000
7	Vladimir Kramnik (Russia)	4	2.5	—N/a	7	**13.5**	$46,666
8	Anish Giri (Netherlands)	5	2.5	(1)	5	**12.5**	$50,000
9	Veselin Topalov (Bulgaria)	2	(1)	7.75	1	**10.75**	$66,250
	Magnus Carlsen (Norway)	10	**13**	—N/a	—N/a	23	$67,500
	Ding Liren (China)	—N/a	—N/a	3	—N/a	3	$15,000
	Michael Adams (England)	—N/a	—N/a	—N/a	3	3	$15,000
	Peter Svidler (Russia)	—N/a	—N/a	2	—N/a	2	$15,000
	Laurent Fressinet (France)	1	—N/a	—N/a	—N/a	1	$7,500

== Grand Chess Tour 2017 ==
The 2017 Grand Chess Tour consisted of five events: three rapid and blitz chess, and two classical chess. By January 2017, six players had qualified for the 2017 Grand Chess Tour; on January 3, three wildcard selections for the tour were announced, bringing the total number of participants to nine. Vladimir Kramnik declined to participate in the 2017 GCT, citing a busy summer schedule. He was replaced by Levon Aronian.

On July 5, Garry Kasparov agreed to join the St. Louis Rapid & Blitz tournament as a wildcard.

=== Players ===
Player	Qualification method	URS rating January 2017	FIDE rating January 2017
Wesley So (United States)	GCT 2016 Winner	2777	2808
Hikaru Nakamura (United States)	GCT 2016 Runner-Up	2787	2785
Fabiano Caruana (United States)	GCT 2016 3rd place	2779	2827
Magnus Carlsen (Norway)	1st 2016 FIDE Average rating	2852	2840
Vladimir Kramnik (Russia)	2nd 2016 FIDE Average rating	2787	2811
Maxime Vachier-Lagrave (France)	3rd 2016 FIDE Average rating	2774	2796
Ian Nepomniachtchi (Russia)	WC (1st URS 1 January 2017 not picked)	2779	2767
Sergey Karjakin (Russia)	WC (2nd URS 1 January 2017 not picked)	2778	2785
Viswanathan Anand (India)	WC	2771	2786
Levon Aronian (Armenia)	WC (Alternate)	2771	2780
Vladimir Kramnik (Russia)	WC (Leuven)	2787	2811
Alexander Grischuk (Russia)	WC (Paris)	2771	2742
Shakhriyar Mamedyarov (Azerbaijan)	WC (Paris)	2768	2766
Veselin Topalov (Bulgaria)	WC (Paris)	?	2739
Étienne Bacrot (France)	WC (Paris)	?	2695
Baadur Jobava (Georgia)	WC (Leuven)	?	2701
Vassily Ivanchuk (Ukraine)	WC (Leuven)	2760	2752
Anish Giri (Netherlands)	WC (Leuven)	2757	2773
Peter Svidler (Russia)	WC (St. Louis)	?	2748
Garry Kasparov (Russia/Croatia) (Note: Kasparov played under both Russian and Croatian flags)	WC (St. Louis Rapid & Blitz)	N/A (Note: Kasparov did not have a URS rating due to inactivity from the years 2005 to 2017.)	2812
Leinier Domínguez (Cuba)	WC (St. Louis Rapid & Blitz)	?	2739
David Navara (Czech Republic)	WC (St. Louis Rapid & Blitz)	?	2735
Lê Quang Liêm (Vietnam)	WC (St. Louis Rapid & Blitz)	?	2718
Michael Adams (England)	WC (London)	?	2751

=== Results ===
	Player	Paris	Leuven	Sinquefield	St. Louis	London	Total points	Prize money
1	Magnus Carlsen (Norway)	12	13	9	—N/a	7	41	$245,417
2	Maxime Vachier-Lagrave (France)	10	8	13	—N/a	7	38	$207,917
3	Levon Aronian (Armenia)	—N/a	5.5	6.5	13	4	29	$91,250
4	Hikaru Nakamura (United States)	8	—N/a	3	9	5	25	$77,500
5	Fabiano Caruana (United States)	3	—N/a	4	5	12	24	$95,000
6	Sergey Karjakin (Russia)	5	—N/a	6.5	9	3	23.5	$75,000
T-7	Wesley So (United States)	4	10	1.5	—N/a	7	22.5	$79,167
T-7	Ian Nepomniachtchi (Russia)	—N/a	4	1.5	7	10	22.5	$100,000
9	Viswanathan Anand (India)	—N/a	3	9	2	1.5	15.5	$75,000
	Anish Giri (Netherlands)	—N/a	7	—N/a	—N/a	—N/a	7	$15,000
	Alexander Grischuk (Russia)	7	—N/a	—N/a	—N/a	—N/a	7	$15,000
	Shakhriyar Mamedyarov (Azerbaijan)	6	—N/a	—N/a	—N/a	—N/a	6	$12,500
	Vladimir Kramnik (Russia)	—N/a	5.5	—N/a	—N/a	—N/a	5.5	$11,250
	Peter Svidler (Russia)	—N/a	—N/a	5	—N/a	—N/a	5	$20,000
	Leinier Domínguez (Cuba)	—N/a	—N/a	—N/a	5	—N/a	5	$10,000
	Lê Quang Liêm (Vietnam)	—N/a	—N/a	—N/a	5	—N/a	5	$10,000
	Garry Kasparov (Russia)	—N/a	—N/a	—N/a	3	—N/a	3	$7,500
	Vassily Ivanchuk (Ukraine)	—N/a	2	—N/a	—N/a	—N/a	2	$7,500
	Veselin Topalov (Bulgaria)	2	—N/a	—N/a	—N/a	—N/a	2	$7,500
	Michael Adams (England)	—N/a	—N/a	—N/a	—N/a	1.5	1.5	$15,000
	Étienne Bacrot (France)	1	—N/a	—N/a	—N/a	—N/a	1	$7,500
	Baadur Jobava (Georgia)	—N/a	1	—N/a	—N/a	—N/a	1	$7,500
	David Navara (Czech Republic)	—N/a	—N/a	—N/a	1	—N/a	1	$7,500

Wildcard players were not eligible for the overall prize funds.

== Grand Chess Tour 2018 ==
The Grand Chess Tour 2018 saw a format change. While the first four events retained the same rules, the last event – the London Chess Classic – served as the semifinals and finals for the top four players from the first four events and consisted of a classical, rapid and blitz section. After tying for fourth place, Fabiano Caruana qualified for the final event by beating Wesley So in a playoff 1½–½. Hikaru Nakamura emerged victorious at the London Chess Classic and clinched the Grand Chess Tour's top prize by beating Maxime Vachier-Lagrave in the blitz section.

=== Results ===
	Player	Leuven	Paris	St. Louis	Sinquefield	Total points	PO	London	Prize money
1	Hikaru Nakamura (United States)	7	13	13	1.5	34.5	—N/a	1st	$225,000
2	Maxime Vachier-Lagrave (France)	9	6	10	6	31	—N/a	2nd	$160,000
3	Fabiano Caruana (United States)	2	2	7	15	26	1½	3rd	$145,000
4	Levon Aronian (Armenia)	6	7	6	15	34	—N/a	4th	$135,000
5	Wesley So (United States)	13	8	2	3	26	½	—N/a	$80,000
6	Sergey Karjakin (Russia)	9	10	5	1.5	25.5	—N/a	—N/a	$72,500
7	Shakhriyar Mamedyarov (Azerbaijan)	4	3	8	10	25	—N/a	—N/a	$65,000
8	Alexander Grischuk (Russia)	5	4	3	6	18	—N/a	—N/a	$45,000
9	Viswanathan Anand (India)	3	5	1	6	15	—N/a	—N/a	$45,000
	Magnus Carlsen (Norway)	—N/a	—N/a	—N/a	15	15	—N/a	—N/a	$55,000
	Leinier Domínguez (Cuba)	—N/a	—N/a	4	—N/a	4	—N/a	—N/a	$7,500
	Anish Giri (Netherlands)	1	—N/a	—N/a	—N/a	1	—N/a	—N/a	$7,500
	Vladimir Kramnik (Russia)	—N/a	1	—N/a	—N/a	1	—N/a	—N/a	$7,500

=== Semifinals and finals at the London Chess Classic (2018) ===
In 2018, the London Chess Classic served as the semifinals and finals for the top four players from the 2018 Grand Chess Tour.

The players played 2 classical games, 2 rapid games, and 4 blitz games. 6 points were awarded for a win, 3 points for a draw and 0 points for a loss in classical play. In the rapid games, 4 points were awarded for a win, 2 points for a draw, and 0 points for a loss. In the blitz games, 2 points were awarded for a win, 1 point for a draw and 0 points for a loss.

After seven consecutive draws that opened his final match with Vachier-Lagrave, Nakamura clinched an event victory by defeating Vachier-Lagrave in the fourth and final blitz game.

Semifinals
1	Hikaru Nakamura (United States)	18
4	Fabiano Caruana (United States)	10
2	Levon Aronian (Armenia)	10
3	Maxime Vachier-Lagrave (France)	18

Finals
1	Hikaru Nakamura (United States)	15
3	Maxime Vachier-Lagrave (France)	13
Third place
4	Fabiano Caruana (United States)	16
2	Levon Aronian (Armenia)	12

== Grand Chess Tour 2019 ==
The 2019 Grand Chess Tour featured 8 tournaments, with 12 full participants and 14 wild card participants. Of the first 7 tournaments, 5 were rapid/blitz tournaments and 2 were classical tournaments. The 12 full participants played in the classical events and in 3 of the 5 rapid/blitz tournaments. As in 2018, the top 4 players after the 7 events qualified for the GCT Finals at the London Chess Classic.

The wildcards were as follows:

Player	Event
Wei Yi (China)	Côte d'Ivoire
Veselin Topalov (Bulgaria)	Côte d'Ivoire
Bassem Amin (Egypt)	Côte d'Ivoire
Alexander Grischuk (Russia)	Paris
Jan-Krzysztof Duda (Poland)	Paris
Daniil Dubov (Russia)	Paris
Leinier Domínguez (United States)	St. Louis
Yu Yangyi (China)	St. Louis
Richárd Rapport (Hungary)	St. Louis
Vladislav Artemiev (Russia)	Superbet
Lê Quang Liêm (Vietnam)	Superbet
Anton Korobov (Ukraine)	Superbet
Vidit Gujrathi (India)	Tata Steel
Pentala Harikrishna (India)	Tata Steel

The tour points were awarded as follows:

Place	1st OR	1st PO	2nd	3rd	4th	5th	6th	7th	8th	9th	10th	11th	12th
Classical	20	18	15	12	10	8	7	6	5	4	3	2	1
Rapid & Blitz	13	12	10	8	7	6	5	4	3	2	1		

- If a player wins 1st place outright, they are awarded 20 points instead of 18 (classical), and 13 instead of 12 (rapid/blitz).
- Tour points are shared equally between tied players.

=== Results ===
	Player	CIV	CRO	PAR	STL	SIN	ROU	IND	Total points	LON	Prize money
1	Ding Liren (China)	6	7	—N/a	8.3	16.5	—N/a	6	43.8	1st	$294,833
2	Maxime Vachier-Lagrave (France)	9	3	13	8.3	3.5	—N/a	—N/a	36.8	2nd	$200,000
3	Magnus Carlsen (Norway)	13	20	—N/a	5	16.5	—N/a	13	67.5	3rd	$302,500
4	Levon Aronian (Armenia)	—N/a	11	—N/a	13	1.5	11	1	37.5	4th	$161,250
5	Sergey Karjakin (Russia)	3.5	5	—N/a	6	11	11	—N/a	36.5	—N/a	$99,250
6	Viswanathan Anand (India)	—N/a	3	10	—N/a	11	8	4	36	—N/a	$97,500
7	Wesley So (United States)	7	15	—N/a	—N/a	1.5	2.5	7.5	33.5	—N/a	$110,000
8	Ian Nepomniachtchi (Russia)	3.5	7	7.5	—N/a	6.5	—N/a	5	29.5	—N/a	$68,583
9	Hikaru Nakamura (United States)	9	1	4	—N/a	3.5	—N/a	10	27.5	—N/a	$75,000
T-10	Fabiano Caruana (United States)	—N/a	11	5	3	6.5	1	—N/a	26.5	—N/a	$76,250
T-10	Anish Giri (Netherlands)	—N/a	7	1	—N/a	6.5	4.5	7.5	26.5	—N/a	$67,333
12	Shakhriyar Mamedyarov (Azerbaijan)	—N/a	3	3	1	6.5	2.5	—N/a	16	—N/a	$48,750
	Yu Yangyi (China)	—N/a	—N/a	—N/a	8.3	—N/a	—N/a	—N/a	8.3	—N/a	$20,000
	Alexander Grischuk (Russia)	—N/a	—N/a	7.5	—N/a	—N/a	—N/a	—N/a	7.5	—N/a	$17,500
	Lê Quang Liêm (Vietnam)	—N/a	—N/a	—N/a	—N/a	—N/a	7	—N/a	7	—N/a	$15,000
	Jan-Krzysztof Duda (Poland)	—N/a	—N/a	6	—N/a	—N/a	—N/a	—N/a	6	—N/a	$12,500
	Anton Korobov (Ukraine)	—N/a	—N/a	—N/a	—N/a	—N/a	6	—N/a	6	—N/a	$12,500
	Wei Yi (China)	5	—N/a	—N/a	—N/a	—N/a	—N/a	—N/a	5	—N/a	$10,000
	Vladislav Artemiev (Russia)	—N/a	—N/a	—N/a	—N/a	—N/a	4.5	—N/a	4.5	—N/a	$8,750
	Richárd Rapport (Hungary)	—N/a	—N/a	—N/a	4	—N/a	—N/a	—N/a	4	—N/a	$7,500
	Vidit Gujrathi (India)	—N/a	—N/a	—N/a	—N/a	—N/a	—N/a	2.5	2.5	—N/a	$7,500
	Pentala Harikrishna (India)	—N/a	—N/a	—N/a	—N/a	—N/a	—N/a	2.5	2.5	—N/a	$7,500
	Daniil Dubov (Russia)	—N/a	—N/a	2	—N/a	—N/a	—N/a	—N/a	2	—N/a	$7,500
	Leinier Domínguez (United States)	—N/a	—N/a	—N/a	2	—N/a	—N/a	—N/a	2	—N/a	$7,500
	Veselin Topalov (Bulgaria)	2	—N/a	—N/a	—N/a	—N/a	—N/a	—N/a	2	—N/a	$7,500
	Bassem Amin (Egypt)	1	—N/a	—N/a	—N/a	—N/a	—N/a	—N/a	1	—N/a	$7,500

=== Semifinals and finals at the London Chess Classic ===
As in 2018, the London Chess Classic served as the semifinals and finals for the top four players from the 2019 Grand Chess Tour.

The players played 2 classical games, 2 rapid games, and 4 blitz games. In classical play, 6 points were awarded for a win, 3 points for a draw and 0 points for a loss. In the rapid games, 4 points were awarded for a win, 2 points for a draw, and 0 points for a loss. In the blitz games, 2 points were awarded for a win, 1 point for a draw and 0 points for a loss. All games were played, even after the match result had been decided.

Vachier-Lagrave won the rapid playoff against Carlsen 1½–½ to advance to the final.

Semifinals
1	Magnus Carlsen (Norway)	14½
4	Maxime Vachier-Lagrave (France)	15½
2	Ding Liren (China)	19
3	Levon Aronian (Armenia)	9

Final
4	Maxime Vachier-Lagrave (France)	12
2	Ding Liren (China)	16
Third place
1	Magnus Carlsen (Norway)	17
3	Levon Aronian (Armenia)	11

== Grand Chess Tour 2020 ==
The 2020 Grand Chess Tour was to feature 5 tournaments, with 10 full participants and 10 wild card participants. 3 tournaments were to be rapid/blitz tournaments and 2 were to have been classical tournaments. The 10 full participants would have played in the classical events and in 2 of the 3 rapid/blitz tournaments. Unlike previous years, there was scheduled to be no Grand Chess Tour finals, due to a busy chess schedule, which includes the Candidates Tournament and the World Chess Championship match.

The 2020 series was cancelled on 3 April 2020 due to the COVID-19 pandemic.

== Grand Chess Tour 2021 ==
The Grand Chess Tour 2021 was held in 2021 with the same 5 tournaments as the cancelled 2020 tournament was to have. There were 9 full tour participants who were supposed to play in both classical tournaments as well as 2 out of the 3 rapid and blitz tournaments. There were also to be 10 wildcards participants who played in one of the rapid and blitz events. Due to travel restrictions, not all Tour players competed in both classical tournaments, and there ended up being 19 wildcards.

The tour points are awarded as follows:

Place	1st OR	1st PO	2nd	3rd	4th	5th	6th	7th	8th	9th	10th
Points	13	12	10	8	7	6	5	4	3	2	1

- If a player wins 1st place outright (without the need for a playoff), they are awarded 13 points instead of 12.
- Tour points are shared equally between tied players.

=== Results ===
	Player	ROU	PAR	CRO	STL	SIN	Total points	Prize money
1	Wesley So (United States)	8.3	13	—N/a	7	8.3	36.6	$242,500
2	Maxime Vachier-Lagrave (France)	1.5	7.5	13	—N/a	13	35	$206,250
3	Shakhriyar Mamedyarov (Azerbaijan)	13	—N/a	5	4.5	4	26.5	$152,000
4	Fabiano Caruana (United States)	3.5	3	—N/a	10	8.3	24.8	$94,250
5	Richárd Rapport (Hungary)	—N/a	5.5	—N/a	8	6	19.5	$42,500
6	Levon Aronian (Armenia)	8.3	5.5	—N/a	—N/a	—N/a	13.8	$56,250
7	Anish Giri (Netherlands)	5.5	—N/a	8	—N/a	—N/a	13.5	$42,500
8	Alexander Grischuk (Russia)	8.3	—N/a	4	—N/a	—N/a	12.3	$54,000
9	Teimour Radjabov (Azerbaijan)	5.5	1	—N/a	—N/a	—N/a	6.5	$28,500
	Ian Nepomniachtchi (Russia)	—N/a	10	6.5	—N/a	—N/a	16.5	$36,750
	Hikaru Nakamura (United States)	—N/a	—N/a	—N/a	13	—N/a	13	$37,500
	Leinier Domínguez Pérez (United States)	—N/a	—N/a	—N/a	4.5	8.3	12.8	$54,500
	Viswanathan Anand (India)	—N/a	—N/a	10	—N/a	—N/a	10	$25,000
	Peter Svidler (Russia)	—N/a	4	—N/a	3	2	9	$29,000
	Alireza Firouzja (FIDE)	—N/a	7.5	—N/a	—N/a	—N/a	7.5	$17,500
	Jan-Krzysztof Duda (Poland)	—N/a	—N/a	6.5	—N/a	—N/a	6.5	$11,250
	Lê Quang Liêm (Vietnam)	—N/a	—N/a	—N/a	6	—N/a	6	$12,500
	Jeffery Xiong (United States)	—N/a	—N/a	—N/a	2	4	6	$24,500
	Sam Shankland (United States)	—N/a	—N/a	—N/a	1	4	5	$23,500
	Bogdan-Daniel Deac (Romania)	3.5	—N/a	—N/a	—N/a	—N/a	3.5	$16,250
	Anton Korobov (Ukraine)	—N/a	—N/a	3	—N/a	—N/a	3	$8,000
	Etienne Bacrot (France); Vladimir Kramnik (Russia) (Note: Bacrot and Kramnik competed as a team, with Bacrot playing the Rapid portion and Kramnik playing the Blitz portion.)	—N/a	2	—N/a	—N/a	—N/a	2	$7,000
	Ivan Šarić (Croatia); Garry Kasparov (RUS/CRO) (Note: Šarić and Kasparov competed as a team, with Šarić playing the Rapid portion and Kasparov playing the Blitz portion.)	—N/a	—N/a	2	—N/a	—N/a	2	$7,000
	Constantin Lupulescu (Romania)	1.5	—N/a	—N/a	—N/a	—N/a	1.5	$11,250
	Jorden van Foreest (Netherlands)	—N/a	—N/a	1	—N/a	—N/a	1	$6,000
	Dariusz Świercz (United States)	—N/a	—N/a	—N/a	—N/a	1	1	$10,000

== Grand Chess Tour 2022 ==
The Grand Chess Tour 2022 was held in 2022 with 5 tournaments, with the Superbet Rapid & Blitz in Poland replacing the Paris GCT Rapid & Blitz from the previous Grand Chess Tour. There were 9 full tour participants who were supposed to play in both classical tournaments as well as 2 out of the 3 rapid and blitz tournaments. There were also 9 wildcards participants who played in one of the rapid and blitz events.

The tour points were awarded as follows:

Place	1st OR	1st PO	2nd	3rd	4th	5th	6th	7th	8th	9th	10th
Points	13	12	10	8	7	6	5	4	3	2	1

- If a player wins 1st place outright (without the need for a playoff), they are awarded 13 points instead of 12.
- Tour points are shared equally between tied players.

=== Results ===
	Player	ROU	POL	CRO	STL	SIN	Total points	Prize money
1	Alireza Firouzja (France)	3.5	—N/a	9	13	11	36.5	$272,250
2	Wesley So (United States)	10	6	6.5	—N/a	7.5	30	$190,167
3	Maxime Vachier-Lagrave (France)	10	—N/a	9	7.5	2.5	29	$165,167
4	Fabiano Caruana (United States)	6	7	—N/a	7.5	7.5	28	$108,833
T-5	Levon Aronian (United States)	10	9	—N/a	3.5	4.5	27	$124,417
T-5	Ian Nepomniachtchi (FIDE) (Note: Russian players' flags are displayed as the FIDE flag due to FIDE banning Russian and Belarusian flags from FIDE-rated events in response to the 2022 Russian invasion of Ukraine.)	3.5	—N/a	6.5	6	11	27	$127,250
7	Leinier Domínguez (United States)	6	—N/a	3.5	1	6	16.5	$68,833
8	Shakhriyar Mamedyarov (Azerbaijan)	1.5	—N/a	3.5	5	2.5	12.5	$46,750
9	Richárd Rapport (Hungary) (Note: Rapport had withdrawn from both St. Louis events due to COVID-19 restrictions in the United States and was replaced by Jeffery Xiong and Hans Niemann respectively.)	1.5	5	—N/a	—N/a	—N/a	6.5	$22,750
	Magnus Carlsen (Norway)	—N/a	—N/a	13	—N/a	w/d	13	$40,000
	Jan-Krzysztof Duda (Poland)	—N/a	13	—N/a	—N/a	—N/a	13	$40,000
	Hikaru Nakamura (United States)	—N/a	—N/a	—N/a	10	—N/a	10	$30,000
	Viswanathan Anand (India)	—N/a	9	—N/a	—N/a	—N/a	9	$27,500
	Bogdan-Daniel Deac (Romania)	6	—N/a	—N/a	—N/a	—N/a	6	$26,333
	Jorden van Foreest (Netherlands)	—N/a	—N/a	5	—N/a	—N/a	5	$11,000
	Hans Niemann (United States)	—N/a	—N/a	—N/a	—N/a	4.5	4.5	$19,750
	Radosław Wojtaszek (Poland)	—N/a	4	—N/a	—N/a	—N/a	4	$10,000
	Jeffery Xiong (United States)	—N/a	—N/a	—N/a	3.5	—N/a	3.5	$9,500
	Anton Korobov (Ukraine)	—N/a	3	—N/a	—N/a	—N/a	3	$9,000
	Kirill Shevchenko (Ukraine)	—N/a	2	—N/a	—N/a	—N/a	2	$8,000
	Sam Shankland (United States)	—N/a	—N/a	—N/a	2	—N/a	2	$8,000
	Veselin Topalov (Bulgaria)	—N/a	—N/a	2	—N/a	—N/a	2	$8,000
	IM David Gavrilescu (Romania)	—N/a	1	—N/a	—N/a	—N/a	1	$7,000
	Ivan Šarić (Croatia)	—N/a	—N/a	1	—N/a	—N/a	1	$7,000

== Grand Chess Tour 2023 ==
The Grand Chess Tour 2023 is being held in 2023 with the same 5 tournaments as the previous edition. There are 9 full tour participants who were supposed to play in both classical tournaments as well as 2 out of the 3 rapid and blitz tournaments. As each tournament will have 10 players, the extra spots will be filled by wildcards.

The tour points were awarded as follows:

Place	1st OR	1st PO	2nd	3rd	4th	5th	6th	7th	8th	9th	10th
Points	13	12	10	8	7	6	5	4	3	2	1

- If a player wins 1st place outright (without the need for a playoff), they are awarded 13 points instead of 12.
- Tour points are shared equally between tied players.

=== Results ===
	Player	ROU	POL	CRO	STL	SIN	Total points	Prize money
1	Fabiano Caruana (United States)	13	—N/a	7	13	13	46	$310,000
2	Maxime Vachier-Lagrave (France)	4.5	7.5	—N/a	10	6	28	$148,583
3	Wesley So (United States)	7.75	7.5	—N/a	4.5	8	27.75	$148,750
4	Ian Nepomniachtchi (FIDE) (Note: Nepomniachtchi is Russian, but plays under the FIDE flag due to FIDE banning Russian and Belarusian flags from FIDE-rated events in response to the Russian invasion of Ukraine.)	2	—N/a	10	7.5	6	25.5	$91,833
5	Alireza Firouzja (France)	7.75	—N/a	8	6	3	24.75	$98,750
6	Richárd Rapport (Romania)	7.75	5	5	—N/a	2	19.75	$77,750
7	Jan-Krzysztof Duda (Poland)	4.5	10	3.5	—N/a	1 (Note: Withdrew after first round)	19	$59,250
8	Anish Giri (Netherlands)	7.75	4	—N/a	2	4	17.75	$79,250
9	Ding Liren (China) (Note: Ding withdrew before the Poland Rapid and Blitz event took place, citing fatigue. As a result of this change, Levon Aronian was chosen as a wildcard to replace him for the event.)	3	—N/a	—N/a	—N/a	—N/a	3	$16,000
	Magnus Carlsen (Norway)	—N/a	13	13	—N/a	—N/a	26	$80,000
	Levon Aronian (United States)	—N/a	6	—N/a	—N/a	6	12	$41,333
	Leinier Domínguez (United States)	—N/a	—N/a	—N/a	—N/a	10	10	$65,000
	Lê Quang Liêm (Vietnam)	—N/a	—N/a	—N/a	7.5	—N/a	7.5	$22,500
	Gukesh D (India)	—N/a	—N/a	6	—N/a	—N/a	6	$15,000
	Ray Robson (United States)	—N/a	—N/a	—N/a	4.5	—N/a	4.5	$10,500
	Viswanathan Anand (India)	—N/a	—N/a	3.5	—N/a	—N/a	3.5	$9,500
	Bogdan-Daniel Deac (Romania)	1	2	—N/a	—N/a	—N/a	3	$18,000
	Kirill Shevchenko (Romania)	—N/a	3	—N/a	—N/a	—N/a	3	$9,000
	Samuel Sevian (United States)	—N/a	—N/a	—N/a	3	—N/a	3	$9,000
	Ivan Šarić (Croatia)	—N/a	—N/a	2	—N/a	—N/a	2	$8,000
	Radosław Wojtaszek (Poland)	—N/a	1	—N/a	—N/a	—N/a	1	$7,000
	Constantin Lupulescu (Romania)	—N/a	—N/a	1	—N/a	—N/a	1	$7,000
	Jeffery Xiong (United States)	—N/a	—N/a	—N/a	1	—N/a	1	$7,000

== Grand Chess Tour 2024 ==
The Grand Chess Tour 2024 is being held in 2024 with the same 5 tournaments as the previous edition. There are 9 full tour participants who were supposed to play in both classical tournaments as well as 2 out of the 3 rapid and blitz tournaments. As each tournament will have 10 players, the extra spots will be filled by wildcards.

The tour points were awarded as follows:

Place	1st OR	1st PO	2nd	3rd	4th	5th	6th	7th	8th	9th	10th
Points	13	12	10	8	7	6	5	4	3	2	1

- If a player wins 1st place outright (without the need for a playoff), they are awarded 13 points instead of 12.
- Tour points are shared equally between tied players.

=== Results ===
	Player	POL	ROU	CRO	STL	SIN	Total points	Prize money
1	Alireza Firouzja (France)	—N/a	9.25	8.33	13	13	43.58	$323,750
2	Fabiano Caruana (United States)	—N/a	9.25	13	4.5	10	36.75	$234,250
3	Maxime Vachier-Lagrave (France)	—N/a	5	8.33	6.5	7.5	27.33	$129,333
4	Wesley So (United States)	—N/a	2.5	8.33	10	5	25.83	$91,333
5	R Praggnanandhaa (India)	7	9.25	—N/a	1	5	22.25	$107,583
6	Gukesh Dommaraju (India)	1	9.25	4	—N/a	5	19.25	$97,583
T-7	Ian Nepomniachtchi (FIDE)	—N/a	5	6	4.5	2.5	18	$61,833
T-7	Nodirbek Abdusattorov (Uzbekistan)	5	2.5	—N/a	3	7.5	18	$74,500
9	Anish Giri (Netherlands)	3	5	3	—N/a	1	12	$50,333
	Magnus Carlsen (Norway)	13	—N/a	—N/a	—N/a	—N/a	13	$40,000
	Levon Aronian (United States)	—N/a	—N/a	5	6.5	—N/a	11.5	$28,500
	Wei Yi (China)	10	—N/a	—N/a	—N/a	—N/a	10	$30,000
	Jan-Krzysztof Duda (Poland)	8	—N/a	—N/a	—N/a	—N/a	8	$25,000
	Hikaru Nakamura (United States)	—N/a	—N/a	—N/a	8	—N/a	8	$25,000
	Arjun Erigaisi (India)	6	—N/a	—N/a	—N/a	—N/a	6	$15,000
	Kirill Shevchenko (Romania)	4	—N/a	—N/a	—N/a	—N/a	4	$10,000
	Ding Liren (China)	—N/a	—N/a	—N/a	—N/a	2.5	2.5	$14,500
	Vincent Keymer (Germany)	2	—N/a	—N/a	—N/a	—N/a	2	$8,000
	Vidit Gujrathi (India)	—N/a	—N/a	2	—N/a	—N/a	2	$8,000
	Leinier Domínguez (United States)	—N/a	—N/a	—N/a	2	—N/a	2	$8,000
	Bogdan-Daniel Deac (Romania)	—N/a	1	—N/a	—N/a	—N/a	1	$10,500
	Ivan Šarić (Croatia)	—N/a	—N/a	1	—N/a	—N/a	1	$7,000

== Grand Chess Tour 2025 ==
The Grand Chess Tour 2025 was held in 2025 with the same 5 tournaments as the previous edition. However, for the first time since 2019, the top 4 players after the 5 events qualified for the GCT Finals, which were held in São Paulo, Brazil. There were 9 full tour participants who played in both classical tournaments as well as 2 out of the 3 rapid and blitz tournaments. As each tournament had 10 players, the extra spots were filled by wildcards.

Each match consisted of the following games:

- 2 classical games (worth 6 points for a win and 3 points for a draw)
- 2 rapid games (worth 4 points for a win and 2 points for a draw)
- 4 blitz games (worth 2 points for a win and 1 point for a draw)

If a match was tied 14-all after these games, two additional shorter rapid games were played, followed by an armageddon game if necessary.

The tour points were awarded as follows:

Place	1st OR	1st PO	2nd	3rd	4th	5th	6th	7th	8th	9th	10th
Points	13	12	10	8	7	6	5	4	3	2	1

- If a player won 1st place outright (without the need for a playoff), they were awarded 13 points instead of 12.
- Tour points were shared equally between tied players.

=== Tour rankings ===
The wildcards (in italics) are not counted in overall standings.

	Player	POL	ROU	CRO	STL	SIN	Total points	Finals	Prize money
1	Fabiano Caruana (United States)	—N/a	7	3.5	10	10	30.5	1st	$289,167
2	Maxime Vachier-Lagrave (France)	10	10	—N/a	8	5	33	2nd	$244,500
3	Levon Aronian (United States)	7	3.5	—N/a	13	7	30.5	3rd	$169,125
4	R Praggnanandhaa (India)	8	10	2	—N/a	10	30	4th	$218,334
5	Wesley So (United States)	—N/a	3.5	10	6	10	29.5	—N/a	$139,792
6	Alireza Firouzja (France)	6	10	6.5	—N/a	2	24.5	—N/a	$113,166
T-7	Nodirbek Abdusattorov (Uzbekistan)	—N/a	6	5	7	1	19	—N/a	$67,500
T-7	Gukesh Dommaraju (India)	—N/a	3.5	8	4.5	3	19	—N/a	$68,625
9	Jan-Krzysztof Duda (Poland)	3.5	1	6.5	—N/a	5	16	—N/a	$59,333

Event wildcards
	Player	POL	ROU	CRO	STL	SIN	Total points	Finals	Prize money
—N/a	Vladimir Fedoseev (Slovenia)	13	—N/a	—N/a	—N/a	—N/a	13	—N/a	$40,000
—N/a	Magnus Carlsen (Norway)	—N/a	—N/a	13	—N/a	—N/a	13	—N/a	$40,000
—N/a	Bogdan-Daniel Deac (Romania)	5	3.5	—N/a	—N/a	—N/a	8.5	—N/a	$28,125
—N/a	Samuel Sevian (United States)	—N/a	—N/a	—N/a	—N/a	5	5	—N/a	$21,833
—N/a	Lê Quang Liêm (Vietnam)	—N/a	—N/a	—N/a	4.5	—N/a	4.5	—N/a	$10,500
—N/a	Aravindh Chithambaram (India)	3.5	—N/a	—N/a	—N/a	—N/a	3.5	—N/a	$9,500
—N/a	Anish Giri (Netherlands)	—N/a	—N/a	3.5	—N/a	—N/a	3.5	—N/a	$9,500
—N/a	Leinier Domínguez (United States)	—N/a	—N/a	—N/a	3	—N/a	3	—N/a	$9,000
—N/a	David Gavrilescu (Romania)	2	—N/a	—N/a	—N/a	—N/a	2	—N/a	$8,000
—N/a	Grigoriy Oparin (United States)	—N/a	—N/a	—N/a	2	—N/a	2	—N/a	$8,000
—N/a	Veselin Topalov (Bulgaria)	1	—N/a	—N/a	—N/a	—N/a	1	—N/a	$7,000
—N/a	Ivan Šarić (Croatia)	—N/a	—N/a	1	—N/a	—N/a	1	—N/a	$7,000
—N/a	Sam Shankland (United States)	—N/a	—N/a	—N/a	1	—N/a	1	—N/a	$7,000

Semifinals
1	Maxime Vachier-Lagrave (France)	6	6	5	17
4	R Praggnanandhaa (India)	6	2	3	11
2	Fabiano Caruana (United States)	6	4	5	15
3	Levon Aronian (United States)	6	4	3	13

Finals
1	Maxime Vachier-Lagrave (France)	6	6	1	13
2	Fabiano Caruana (United States)	6	2	7	15
Third place
4	R Praggnanandhaa (India)	6	0	2	8
3	Levon Aronian (United States)	6	8	6	20

== Grand Chess Tour 2026 ==
The Grand Chess Tour 2026 was held in 2026 with the same 5 tournaments and the tour final as the previous edition. There were 9 full tour participants who were supposed to play in both classical tournaments as well as 2 out of the 3 rapid and blitz tournaments. As each tournament had 10 players, the extra spots were filled by wildcards.

The events were held during the following dates, at these respective host cities. The Superbet Rapid & Blitz Poland was held during May 3–10 in Warsaw, Poland. The Superbet Chess Classic Romania was held during May 12–24 in Bucharest, Romania. The SuperUnited Rapid & Blitz Croatia will be held during June 29–July 6 in Zagreb, Croatia. The Saint Louis Rapid & Blitz, Sinquefield Cup and GCT Finals were held during July 29–August 28 in Saint Louis, Missouri, USA.

Each match consisted of the following games:

- 2 classical games (worth 6 points for a win and 3 points for a draw)
- 2 rapid games (worth 4 points for a win and 2 points for a draw)
- 4 blitz games (worth 2 points for a win and 1 point for a draw)

If a match is tied 14-all after these games, two additional shorter rapid games will be played, followed by an armageddon game if necessary.

The tour points were awarded as follows:

Place	1st OR	1st PO	2nd	3rd	4th	5th	6th	7th	8th	9th	10th
Points	13	12	10	8	7	6	5	4	3	2	1

- If a player won 1st place outright (without the need for a playoff), they were awarded 13 points instead of 12.
- Tour points were shared equally between tied players.

=== Tour rankings ===
	Player	POL	ROU	CRO	STL	SIN	Total points	Finals	Prize money
1	R Praggnanandhaa (India)	—N/a	4	7.5	13	11	35.5	1st	$404,354
2	Fabiano Caruana (United States)	10	10	—N/a	5	4.5	29.5	2nd	$297,958
3	Wesley So (United States)	8	7.5	—N/a	8	11	34.5	3rd	$280,625
4	Vincent Keymer (Germany)	—N/a	13	6	2	7.5	28.5	4th	$270,187
5	Javokhir Sindarov (Uzbekistan)	3	7.5	—N/a	10	7.5	28	—N/a	$170,458
6	Maxime Vachier-Lagrave (France)	3	4	7.5	—N/a	4.5	19	—N/a	$89,729
7	Anish Giri (Netherlands)	—N/a	4	4	3	2	13	—N/a	$67,229
8	Jorden van Foreest (Netherlands)	—N/a	4	2	5	1	12	—N/a	$58,416
– (Note: Firouzja withdrew from the Sinquefield Cup after choosing to compete in the Esports World Cup. In accordance with his player agreement, he was also deemed to have withdrawn from the whole tour, and all the tour points earned by him were nullified.)	Alireza Firouzja (France)	~~6~~	~~1~~	~~11~~	—N/a	—N/a	–	—N/a	$72,500
	Hans Niemann (United States)	13	—N/a	—N/a	—N/a	—N/a	13	—N/a	$50,000
	Levon Aronian (United States)	—N/a	—N/a	—N/a	7	4.5	11.5	—N/a	$47,312
	Nodirbek Abdusattorov (Uzbekistan)	—N/a	—N/a	11	—N/a	—N/a	11	—N/a	$42,500
	Gukesh Dommaraju (India)	5	—N/a	5	—N/a	—N/a	10	—N/a	$22,000
	Vladimir Fedoseev (Slovenia)	7	—N/a	—N/a	—N/a	—N/a	7	—N/a	$20,000
	Bogdan-Daniel Deac (Romania)	—N/a	4	3	—N/a	—N/a	7	—N/a	$37,416
	Leinier Dominguez (United States)	—N/a	—N/a	—N/a	5	—N/a	5	—N/a	$12,000
	Samuel Sevian (United States)	—N/a	—N/a	—N/a	—N/a	4.5	4.5	—N/a	$27,312
	Jan-Krzysztof Duda (Poland)	3	—N/a	—N/a	—N/a	—N/a	3	—N/a	$9,000
	Radosław Wojtaszek (Poland)	1	—N/a	—N/a	—N/a	—N/a	1	—N/a	$7,000
	Ivan Šarić (Croatia)	—N/a	—N/a	1	—N/a	—N/a	1	—N/a	$7,000
	Awonder Liang (United States)	—N/a	—N/a	—N/a	1	—N/a	1	—N/a	$7,000

Semifinals
1	(India) R Praggnanandhaa	9	8	2	19
4	(Germany) Vincent Keymer	3	0	6	9
2	(United States) Wesley So	6	4	2	12
3	(United States) Fabiano Caruana	8	4	6	18

Finals
1	(India) R Praggnanandhaa	3	8	4	15
3	(United States) Fabiano Caruana	9	0	4	13
Third place
4	(Germany) Vincent Keymer	8	4	0	12
2	(United States) Wesley So	6	4	8	18
