= Grand Chess Tour 2018 =

Chess tournaments circuit

Grand Chess Tour
- 2018
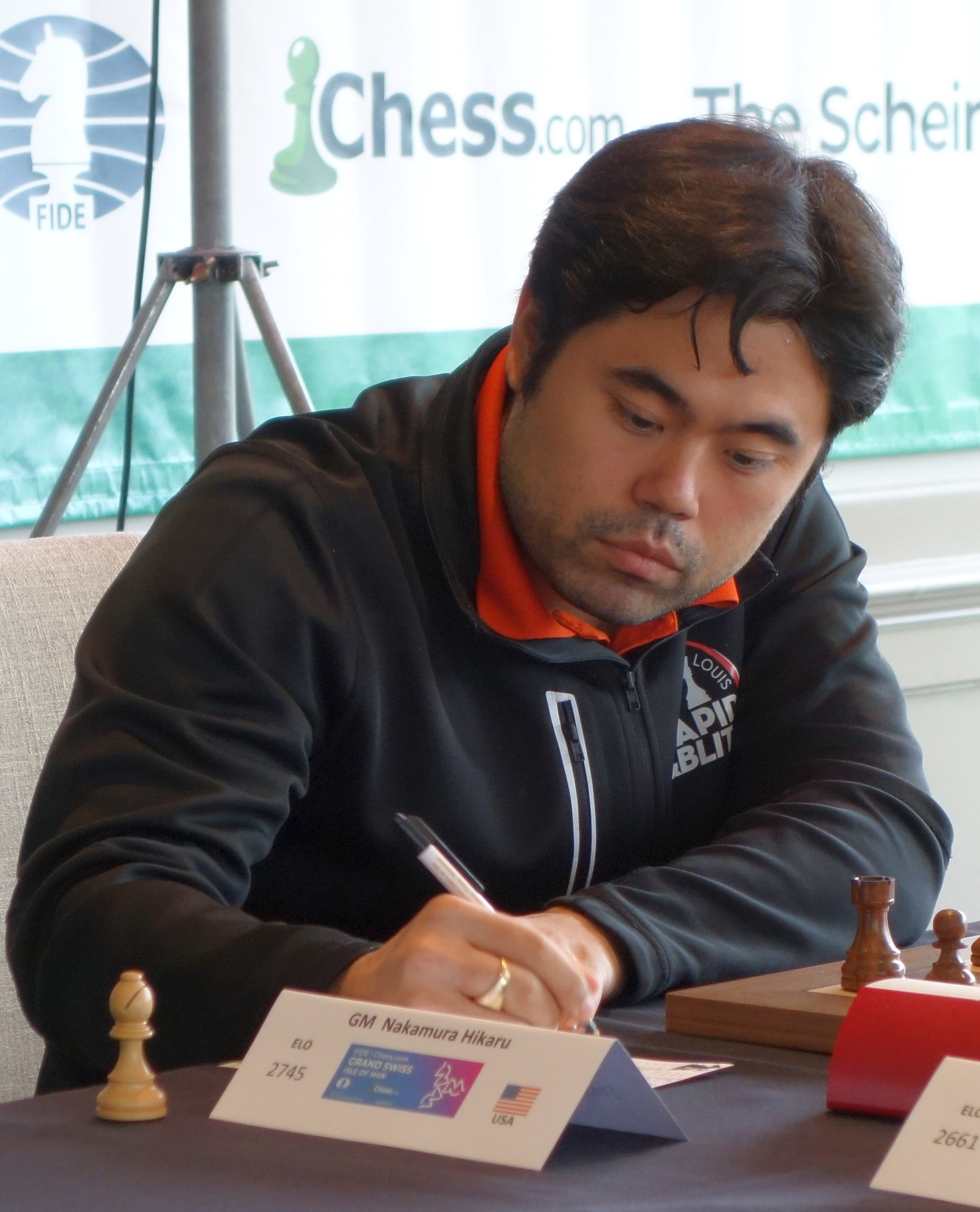
- 2018 Grand Chess Tour winner Hikaru Nakamura.

Tournament information
- Dates: 10 June–21 December 2019
- Host(s): Leuven; Paris; St. Louis; London

Final positions
- Champion: (United States) Hikaru Nakamura
- Runner-up: (France) Maxime Vachier-Lagrave
- 3rd place: (United States) Fabiano Caruana

Tournament statistics
- Most tournament titles: (United States) Hikaru Nakamura (3)
- Prize money leader: (United States) Hikaru Nakamura ($225,000)
- Points leader: (United States) Hikaru Nakamura (34.5)

The Grand Chess Tour 2018 was a circuit of chess tournaments, held from June to December 2018. It was the fourth edition of Grand Chess Tour. The series consisted of four events, including 1 classical and 3 fast chess tournaments, as well as Tour Final in London. It was won by Hikaru Nakamura.

== Format ==
The tour consisted of four events, including three rapid and blitz and one classical event, and concluded in Tour Finals in London, where four top scorers qualified. Each event consisted of 9 regular tour participants and 1 wildcard. Scoring system looked as follows:

Place	Points (classical)	Points (rapid/blitz)
1st	18/20*	12/13*
2nd	15	10
3rd	12	8
4th	10	7
5th	8	6
6th	6	5
7th	4	4
8th	3	3
9th	2	2
10th	1	1

== Lineup ==
The field was announced on January 29, 2018. The lineup was selected based on several criteria, including top three finish in previous edition, URS, average FIDE rating from February 1, 2017, to January 1, 2018, and personal invitation by GCT Advisory Board. Initially, it consisted of ten players, including reigning World Chess Champion Magnus Carlsen and his predecessors – Viswanathan Anand and Vladimir Kramnik. However, Carlsen and Kramnik declined the invitations, with number of players reducing to nine and last spot being given to Sergey Karjakin. Both Carlsen and Kramnik later played as wildcards.

Player	Country	Rating (January 2018)	Eligility criteria
Maxime Vachier-Lagrave	France	2793	Runner-up of 2017 Grand Chess Tour
Levon Aronian	Armenia	2797	Third place in 2017 Grand Chess Tour
Fabiano Caruana	United States	2811	Average rating
Wesley So	United States	2792	Average rating
Hikaru Nakamura	United States	2781	URS
Alexander Grischuk	Russia	2767	URS
Shakhriyar Mamedyarov	Azerbaijan	2804	URS
Viswanathan Anand	India	2767	Wildcard
Sergey Karjakin	Russia	2753	Replacement

== Schedule and results ==
Dates	Tournament	Host city	Winner
10–17 June	Your Next Move Rapid and Blitz	Leuven	Wesley So
17–26 June	Paris Rapid and Blitz	Paris	Hikaru Nakamura
9–16 August	Saint Louis Rapid and Blitz	St. Louis	Hikaru Nakamura
16–29 August	Sinquefield Cup	St. Louis	Magnus Carlsen (WC); Levon Aronian; Fabiano Caruana
11–17 December	London Chess Classic	London	Hikaru Nakamura

== Tournaments ==
=== Your Next Move Rapid and Blitz ===
First leg of 2018 Grand Chess Tour took place on June 12–16 in Leuven City Hall, Leuven, Belgium. The wildcard for the event was Dutch Grandmaster Anish Giri, who ultimately finished on last place. The tournament was won by Wesley So.

2018 Your Next Move, June 12–16 Leuven, Belgium
	Player	Rapid	Blitz	Total	TB	Tour Points	Prize money
1	Wesley So (USA)	14	8	22		13	$37,500
2	Sergey Karjakin (RUS)	10	11½	21½		9	$22,500
3	Maxime Vachier-Lagrave (FRA)	11	10½	21½		9	$22,500
4	Hikaru Nakamura (USA)	10	11	21		7	$15,000
5	Levon Aronian (ARM)	11	9½	20½		6	$12,500
6	Alexander Grischuk (RUS)	8	9½	17½		5	$10,000
7	Shakhriyar Mamedyarov (AZE)	9	8	17		4	$7,500
8	Viswanathan Anand (IND)	5	9½	14½		3	$7,500
9	Fabiano Caruana (USA)	7	6½	13½		2	$7,500
10	Anish Giri (NED)	5	6	11		WC (1)	$7,500

Your Next Move Rapid, June 12–14
	Player	Rating	1	2	3	4	5	6	7	8	9	10	Points
1	Wesley So (USA)	2763		1	1	2	1	2	2	2	1	2	14
2	Levon Aronian (ARM)	2795	1		1	2	0	1	1	2	1	2	11
3	Maxime Vachier-Lagrave (FRA)	2777	1	1		1	1	1	1	1	2	2	11
4	Hikaru Nakamura (USA)	2813	0	0	1		1	2	2	0	2	2	10
5	Sergey Karjakin (RUS)	2743	1	2	1	1		1	2	0	1	1	10
6	Shakhriyar Mamedyarov (AZE)	2766	0	1	1	0	1		1	2	2	1	9
7	Alexander Grischuk (RUS)	2783	0	1	1	0	0	1		2	2	1	8
8	Fabiano Caruana (USA)	2753	0	0	1	2	2	0	0		0	2	7
9	Viswanathan Anand (IND)	2822	1	1	0	0	1	0	0	2		0	5
10	Anish Giri (NED)	2779	0	0	0	0	1	1	1	0	2		5

Your Next Move Blitz, June 15–16
	Player	Rating	1	2	3	4	5	6	7	8	9	10	Points
1	Sergey Karjakin (RUS)	2816		½ ½	1 0	½ 0	1 1	½ ½	1 0	½ 1	1 1	½ 1	11½
2	Hikaru Nakamura (USA)	2878	½ ½		0 0	1 ½	0 1	1 1	1 1	1 1	½ 0	0 1	11
3	Maxime Vachier-Lagrave (FRA)	2837	0 1	1 1		½ 1	0 0	½ 1	½ 0	½ ½	½ 1	1 ½	10½
4	Alexander Grischuk (RUS)	2831	½ 1	0 ½	½ 0		½ 1	1 0	½ 1	½ ½	1 0	½ ½	9½
5	Viswanathan Anand (IND)	2817	0 0	1 0	1 1	½ 0		0 ½	½ ½	½ ½	1 1	½ 1	9½
6	Levon Aronian (ARM)	2809	½ ½	0 0	½ 0	0 1	1 ½		1 ½	½ ½	1 0	1 1	9½
7	Shakhriyar Mamedyarov (AZE)	2757	0 1	0 0	½ 1	½ 0	½ ½	0 ½		1 1	½ ½	0 ½	8
8	Wesley So (USA)	2856	½ 0	0 0	½ ½	½ ½	½ ½	½ ½	0 0		½ 1	1 1	8
9	Fabiano Caruana (USA)	2818	0 0	½ 1	½ 0	0 1	0 0	0 1	½ ½	½ 0		½ ½	6½
10	Anish Giri (NED)	2799	½ 0	1 0	0 ½	½ ½	½ 0	0 0	1 ½	0 0	½ ½		6

=== Paris Rapid and Blitz ===
Paris Grand Chess Tour took place on June 20–24 in Paris, France and was second event of 2018 Grand Chess Tour. Former world champion Vladimir Kramnik played as wildcard. The event was won by Hikaru Nakamura.

2018 Paris GCT, June 20–24 Paris, France
	Player	Rapid	Blitz	Total	TB	Tour Points	Prize money
1	Hikaru Nakamura (USA)	11	12	23		13	$37,500
2	Sergey Karjakin (RUS)	11	10½	21½		10	$25,000
3	Wesley So (USA)	12	9	21		8	$20,000
4	Levon Aronian (ARM)	9	11	20		7	$15,000
5	Maxime Vachier-Lagrave (FRA)	9	10½	19½		6	$12,500
6	Viswanathan Anand (IND)	9	8	17		5	$10,000
7	Alexander Grischuk (RUS)	7	9	16		4	$7,500
8	Shakhriyar Mamedyarov (AZE)	7	8½	15½		3	$7,500
9	Fabiano Caruana (USA)	8	5½	13½		2	$7,500
10	Vladimir Kramnik (RUS)	7	6	13		WC (1)	$7,500

Paris GCT Rapid, June 20–22
	Player	Rating	1	2	3	4	5	6	7	8	9	10	Points
1	Wesley So (USA)	2763		1	1	2	1	1	2	0	2	2	12
2	Sergey Karjakin (RUS)	2743	1		1	1	1	1	1	2	2	1	11
3	Hikaru Nakamura (USA)	2813	1	1		1	1	2	2	1	1	1	11
4	Maxime Vachier-Lagrave (FRA)	2777	0	1	1		2	1	1	2	1	0	9
5	Levon Aronian (ARM)	2795	1	1	1	0		1	0	2	1	2	9
6	Viswanathan Anand (IND)	2822	1	1	0	1	1		1	1	2	1	9
7	Fabiano Caruana (USA)	2753	0	1	0	1	2	1		1	2	0	8
8	Shakhriyar Mamedyarov (AZE)	2766	2	0	1	0	0	1	1		0	2	7
9	Vladimir Kramnik (RUS)	2775	0	0	1	1	1	0	0	2		2	7
10	Alexander Grischuk (RUS)	2783	0	1	1	2	0	1	2	0	0		7

Paris GCT Blitz, June 23–24
	Player	Rating	1	2	3	4	5	6	7	8	9	10	Points
1	Hikaru Nakamura (USA)	2878		½ ½	½ ½	½ ½	½ ½	1 ½	0 1	½ 1	1 1	1 1	12
2	Levon Aronian (ARM)	2809	½ ½		½ ½	0 ½	½ ½	½ ½	½ 1	1 ½	1 1	½ 1	11
3	Maxime Vachier-Lagrave (FRA)	2837	½ ½	½ ½		1 1	½ 0	½ ½	0 1	1 ½	1 0	1 ½	10½
4	Sergey Karjakin (RUS)	2816	½ ½	1 ½	0 0		1 ½	1 ½	0 ½	1 0	1 1	1 ½	10½
5	Wesley So (USA)	2856	½ ½	½ ½	½ 1	0 ½		0 ½	1 ½	½ ½	½ ½	½ ½	9
6	Alexander Grischuk (RUS)	2831	0 ½	½ ½	½ ½	0 ½	1 ½		½ ½	0 1	½ ½	1 ½	9
7	Shakhriyar Mamedyarov (AZE)	2757	1 0	½ 0	1 0	1 ½	0 ½	½ ½		½ ½	0 1	0 1	8½
8	Viswanathan Anand (IND)	2817	½ 0	0 ½	0 ½	0 1	½ ½	1 0	½ ½		½ ½	½ 1	8
9	Vladimir Kramnik (RUS)	2793	0 0	0 0	0 1	0 0	½ ½	½ ½	1 0	½ ½		1 0	6
10	Fabiano Caruana (USA)	2799	0 0	½ 0	0 ½	0 ½	½ ½	0 ½	1 0	½ 0	0 1		5½

=== Saint Louis Rapid and Blitz ===
2018 Saint Louis Rapid and Blitz, August 10–16 St. Louis, Missouri, United States
	Player	Rapid	Blitz	Total	TB	Tour Points	Prize money
1	Hikaru Nakamura (USA)	12	10½	22½		13	$37,500
2	Maxime Vachier-Lagrave (FRA)	8	13½	21½		10	$25,000
3	Shakhriyar Mamedyarov (AZE)	12	9	21		8	$20,000
4	Fabiano Caruana (USA)	11	9	20		7	$15,000
5	Levon Aronian (ARM)	9	9	18		6	$12,000
6	Sergey Karjakin (RUS)	9	8	17		5	$10,000
7	Leinier Domínguez (CUB)	9	7	16		WC (4)	$7,500
8	Alexander Grischuk (RUS)	6	9½	15½		3	$7,500
9	Wesley So (USA)	8	7	15		2	$7,500
10	Viswanathan Anand (IND)	6	7½	13½		1	$7,500

Saint Louis Rapid, August 11-13
	Player	Rating	1	2	3	4	5	6	7	8	9	10	Points
1	Hikaru Nakamura (USA)	2812		1	2	1	1	2	2	2	1	0	12
2	Shakhriyar Mamedyarov (AZE)	2782	1		1	2	0	1	2	2	1	2	12
3	Levon Aronian (ARM)	2794	0	1		1	2	1	2	1	1	2	11
4	Sergey Karjakin (RUS)	2791	1	0	1		1	2	1	1	1	1	9
5	Fabiano Caruana (USA)	2785	1	2	0	1		0	1	1	2	1	9
6	Leinier Domínguez (CUB)	2754	0	1	1	0	2		1	2	1	1	9
7	Maxime Vachier-Lagrave (FRA)	2796	0	0	0	1	1	1		1	2	2	8
8	Wesley So (USA)	2794	0	0	1	1	1	0	1		2	2	8
9	Alexander Grischuk (RUS)	2782	1	1	1	1	0	1	0	0		1	6
10	Viswanathan Anand (IND)	2771	2	0	0	1	1	1	0	0	1		6

Saint Louis Blitz, August 15–16
	Player	Rating	1	2	3	4	5	6	7	8	9	10	Points
1	Maxime Vachier-Lagrave (FRA)	2878		½ 1	½ 1	1 1	1 1	½ 0	1 ½	1 ½	1 1	½ ½	13½
2	Hikaru Nakamura (USA)	2913	½ 0		½ 1	1 1	½ 1	0 1	0 0	½ ½	1 ½	1 ½	10½
3	Alexander Grischuk (RUS)	2831	½ 0	½ 0		½ ½	1 ½	1 1	½ 1	0 ½	1 ½	½ 0	9½
4	Shakhriyar Mamedyarov (AZE)	2795	0 0	0 0	½ ½		1 1	0 1	1 1	1 ½	½ 0	1 0	9
5	Fabiano Caruana (USA)	2709	0 0	½ 0	0 ½	0 0		½ 1	1 1	½ 1	1 ½	1 ½	9
6	Levon Aronian (ARM)	2871	½ 1	1 0	0 0	1 0	½ 0		½ 0	½ 1	½ 1	½ 1	9
7	Sergey Karjakin (RUS)	2898	0 ½	1 1	½ 0	0 0	0 0	½ 1		1 ½	½ ½	0 1	8
8	Viswanathan Anand (IND)	2812	0 ½	½ ½	1 ½	0 ½	½ 0	½ 0	0 ½		½ ½	½ 1	7½
9	Leinier Domínguez (CUB)	2687	0 0	0 ½	0 ½	½ 1	0 ½	½ 0	½ ½	½ ½		1 ½	7
10	Wesley So (USA)	2800	½ ½	0 ½	½ 1	0 1	0 ½	½ 0	1 0	½ 0	0 ½		7

=== Sinquefield Cup ===
The Sinquefield Cup in St. Louis, Missouri, United States was the last leg of 2018 Grand Chess Tour before the tour finals. Magnus Carlsen, Levon Aronian and Fabiano Caruana all shared first place by scoring 5½ out of 9.

6th Sinquefield Cup, 18–28 August 2018, St. Louis, Missouri, United States, Category XXII (2787.5)
	Player	Rating	1	2	3	4	5	6	7	8	9	10	Points	H2H	Wins	Black	TPR	Tour Points
1–3	Magnus Carlsen (NOR)	2842		½	½	½	½	½	½	½	1	1	5½	1	2	0	2861	WC (15)
1–3	Fabiano Caruana (USA)	2822	½		½	½	½	½	½	½	1	1	5½	1	2	0	2864	15
1–3	Levon Aronian (ARM)	2767	½	½		½	1	½	½	½	½	1	5½	1	2	0	2870	15
4	Shakhriyar Mamedyarov (AZE)	2801	½	½	½		½	½	½	1	½	½	5		1	0	2829	10
5	Alexander Grischuk (RUS)	2766	½	½	0	½		½	½	½	1	½	4½	1	1	1	2790	6
6–7	Maxime Vachier-Lagrave (FRA)	2779	½	½	½	½	½		½	½	½	½	4½	1	0	0	2788	6
6–7	Viswanathan Anand (IND)	2768	½	½	½	½	½	½		½	½	½	4½	1	0	0	2790	6
8	Wesley So (USA)	2780	½	½	½	0	½	½	½		½	½	4		0	0	2745	3
9–10	Hikaru Nakamura (USA)	2777	0	0	½	½	0	½	½	½		½	3	½	0	0	2664	1.5
9–10	Sergey Karjakin (RUS)	2773	0	0	0	½	½	½	½	½	½		3	½	0	0	2664	1.5

=== Tour finals ===
In 2018, the London Chess Classic served as the semifinals and finals for the top 4 players from the 2018 Grand Chess Tour.

The players played 2 classical games, 2 rapid games, and 4 blitz games. 6 points were awarded for a win, 3 points for a draw and 0 points for a loss in classical play. In the Rapid games, 4 points were awarded for a win, 2 points for a draw, and 0 points for a loss. In the Blitz games, 2 points were awarded for a win, 1 point for a draw and 0 point for a loss.

After seven consecutive draws that opened his final match with Vachier-Lagrave, Nakamura clinched an event victory by defeating Vachier-Lagrave in the fourth and final blitz game.

Semifinals
1	Hikaru Nakamura (United States)	18
4	Fabiano Caruana (United States)	10
2	Levon Aronian (Armenia)	10
3	Maxime Vachier-Lagrave (France)	18

Finals
1	Hikaru Nakamura (United States)	15
3	Maxime Vachier-Lagrave (France)	13
Third place
4	Fabiano Caruana (United States)	16
2	Levon Aronian (Armenia)	12

== Standings ==
	Player	Leuven	Paris	St. Louis	Sinquefield	Total points	PO	London	Prize money
1	Hikaru Nakamura (United States)	7	13	13	1.5	34.5	—	1st	$225,000
2	Maxime Vachier-Lagrave (France)	9	6	10	6	31	—	2nd	$160,000
3	Fabiano Caruana (United States)	2	2	7	15	26	1½	3rd	$145,000
4	Levon Aronian (Armenia)	6	7	6	15	34	—	4th	$135,000
5	Wesley So (United States)	13	8	2	3	26	½	—	$80,000
6	Sergey Karjakin (Russia)	9	10	5	1.5	25.5	—	—	$72,500
7	Shakhriyar Mamedyarov (Azerbaijan)	4	3	8	10	25	—	—	$65,000
8	Alexander Grischuk (Russia)	5	4	3	6	18	—	—	$45,000
9	Viswanathan Anand (India)	3	5	1	6	15	—	—	$45,000
	Magnus Carlsen (Norway)	—	—	—	15	15	—	—	$55,000
	Leinier Domínguez (Cuba)	—	—	4	—	4	—	—	$7,500
	Anish Giri (Netherlands)	1	—	—	—	1	—	—	$7,500
	Vladimir Kramnik (Russia)	—	1	—	—	1	—	—	$7,500
