= Sinquefield Cup =

American chess tournament (2013–present)

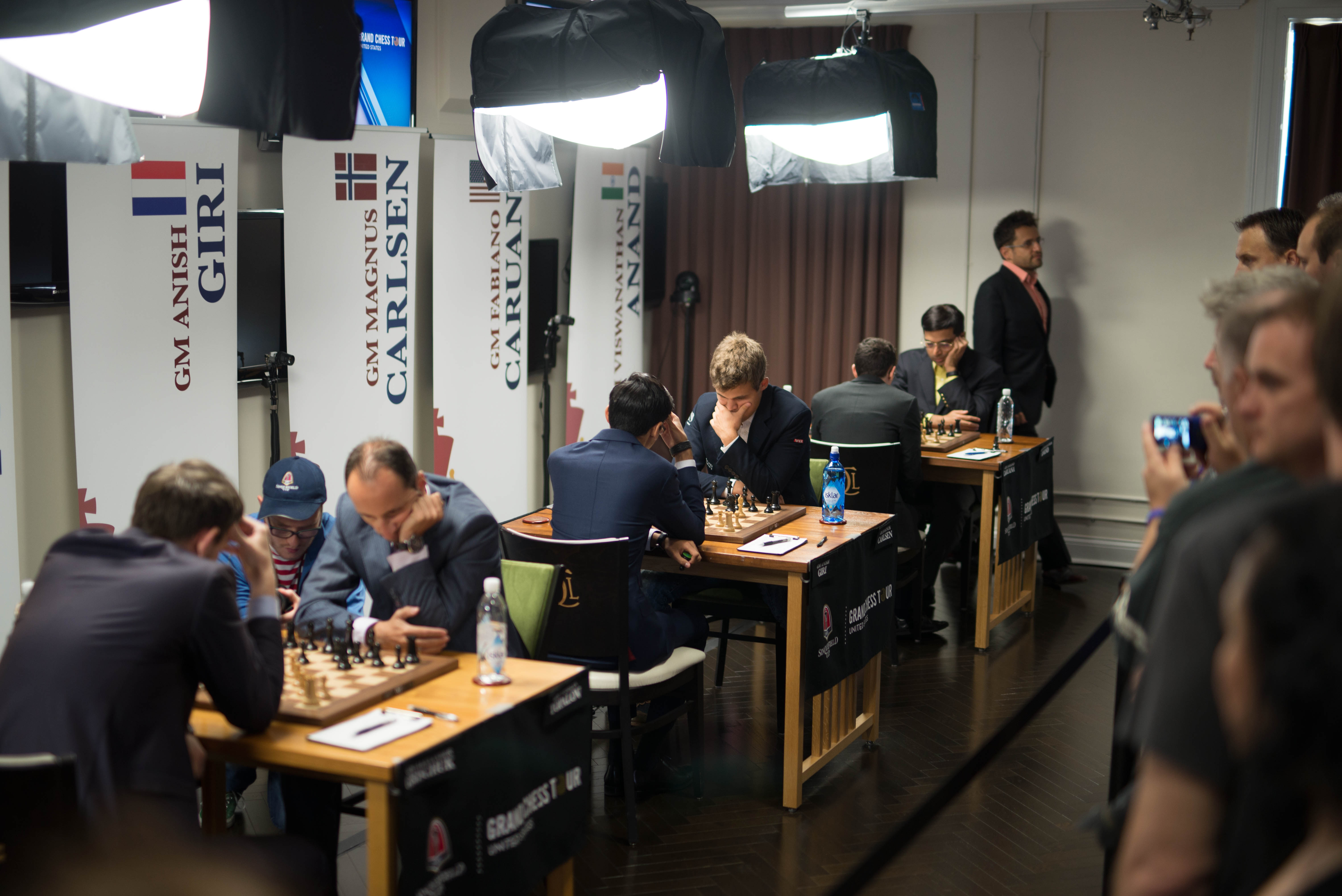
- Playing hall of the Sinquefield Cup 2015

Tournament information
- Sport: Chess
- Location: St. Louis, United States
- Established: 2013
- Format: Round-robin tournament
- Most championships: (United States) Fabiano Caruana (United States) Wesley So (3)

Current champion
- (United States) Wesley So

The Sinquefield Cup is an annual, closed chess tournament hosted by the Saint Louis Chess Club in St. Louis, Missouri, United States.

It was first held in 2013 as a four-player round-robin tournament. In 2015, it became part of the Grand Chess Tour. In 2016, it was the Tour's third leg and the first slow time control event of the tour.

The tournament was started by billionaire Rex Sinquefield as part of his efforts to boost U.S. chess and turn St. Louis into an international chess center.

== Winners ==
#	Year	Winner(s)
1	2013	Magnus Carlsen (Norway)
2	2014	Fabiano Caruana (Italy)
3	2015	Levon Aronian (Armenia)
4	2016	Wesley So (United States)
5	2017	Maxime Vachier-Lagrave (France)
6	2018	Magnus Carlsen (Norway) Fabiano Caruana (United States) Levon Aronian (Armenia)
7	2019	Ding Liren (China)
8	2021	Maxime Vachier-Lagrave (France)
9	2022	Alireza Firouzja (France)
10	2023	Fabiano Caruana (United States)
11	2024	Alireza Firouzja (France)
12	2025	Wesley So (United States)
13	2026	Wesley So (United States)

== 2013 ==
The first edition, in double round-robin format, (working title: 2013 Saint Louis International) was held from September 9 to 15, 2013, at the Chess Club and Scholastic Center of Saint Louis. The four grandmasters played the classic time control: 40 moves in 90 minutes with a 30-second increment as of move one, followed by 30 minutes for the rest of the game. The total prize fund was $170,000, with $70,000 going to the winner, $50,000 to runner-up, $30,000 to third place and $20,000 to fourth place. The average FIDE rating for the field was 2797, the highest-rated tournament at the time. The opening ceremony took place on 8 September 2013, and round 1 was held the next day. This was the last tournament for Magnus Carlsen before he became world champion at the World Chess Championship 2013.

1st Sinquefield Cup, September 9–15 2013, St. Louis, USA, Cat. XXII (2797)
	Player	Rating	1	2	3	4	Points	TPR
1	Magnus Carlsen (Norway)	2862		½ ½	½ 1	1 1	4½	2968
2	Hikaru Nakamura (United States)	2772	½ ½		1 0	1 ½	3½	2862
3	Levon Aronian (Armenia)	2813	½ 0	0 1		½ ½	2½	2735
4	Gata Kamsky (United States)	2741	0 0	0 ½	½ ½		1½	2623

== 2014 ==
The second edition was held from August 27 to September 7, at the Chess Club and Scholastic Center of Saint Louis. It is by rating the strongest tournament in the history of chess, as measured by the six participants' average Elo rating of 2802. All were in the top ten of FIDE's Elo rating list: 1, 2, 3, 5, 8 and 9 in the world.

The double round-robin tournament again used the time control of 40 moves in 90 minutes with a 30-second increment for every move, followed by an additional 30 minutes plus the per-move-increment for the rest of the game.

The total prize fund was increased to $315,000, with $100,000 going to the winner.

2nd Sinquefield Cup, August 27 – September 7, 2014, St. Louis, Missouri, United States, Category XXIII (2801.7)
	Player	Rating	1	2	3	4	5	6	Points	Wins	H2H	TPR
1	Fabiano Caruana (Italy)	2801		1 ½	1 1	1 1	1 ½	1 ½	8½			3098
2	Magnus Carlsen (Norway)	2877	0 ½		½ ½	½ ½	1 ½	½ 1	5½			2823
3	Veselin Topalov (Bulgaria)	2772	0 0	½ ½		1 ½	0 ½	1 1	5			2808
4	Maxime Vachier-Lagrave (France)	2768	0 0	½ ½	0 ½		1 ½	½ ½	4	1	1½	2736
5	Levon Aronian (Armenia)	2805	0 ½	0 ½	1 ½	0 ½		½ ½	4	1	½	2729
6	Hikaru Nakamura (United States)	2787	0 ½	½ 0	0 0	½ ½	½ ½		3			2656

After round 7, Caruana had a score of 7/7, which Levon Aronian called a "historical achievement". Caruana drew his remaining games to finish with 8½/10 and a performance rating of 3098, the highest performance rating in a single tournament, besting Carlsen's performance in the 2009 Nanjing Pearl Spring tournament and Anatoly Karpov in the 1994 Linares chess tournament. It was compared to Bobby Fischer's 20-game winning streak in 1970–1971.

Vachier-Lagrave finished fourth, ahead of Aronian on tie-break (direct encounter).

== 2015 ==
The third edition was held from August 22 to September 3, at the Chess Club and Scholastic Center of Saint Louis as the second leg in the 2015 Grand Chess Tour. The tournament featured the seven top players in the world, a feat only surpassed by the AVRO 1938 chess tournament. The Sinquefield Cup was also the strongest tournament featured in the 2015 Grand Chess Tour with an average FIDE Rating of 2795.

The 2015 Sinquefield Cup was a single round-robin event held with a time control of 40 moves in 2 hours, followed by the rest of the game in 1 hour with a 30-second increment from move 41. Wesley So was selected as the tournament invite and joined the nine other players already participating in the Grand Chess Tour.

3rd Sinquefield Cup, August 22 – September 3, 2015, St. Louis, Missouri, United States, Category XXII (2794.6)
	Player	Rating	1	2	3	4	5	6	7	8	9	10	Points	Wins	H2H	SB	TPR	Tour Points
1	Levon Aronian (Armenia)	2765		½	1	½	½	½	½	1	½	1	6				2923	13
2	Magnus Carlsen (Norway)	2853	½		½	1	½	0	0	1	½	1	5	3	½	21.25	2831	10
3	Hikaru Nakamura (United States)	2814	0	½		½	½	1	0	½	1	1	5	3	½	20.25	2835	8
4	Maxime Vachier-Lagrave (France)	2731	½	0	½		½	½	1	½	½	1	5	2			2845	7
5	Anish Giri (Netherlands)	2793	½	½	½	½		1	½	½	½	½	5	1			2838	6
6	Alexander Grischuk (Russia)	2771	½	1	0	½	0		½	1	1	0	4½	3			2797	5
7	Veselin Topalov (Bulgaria)	2816	½	1	1	0	½	½		0	½	½	4½	2			2792	4
8	Fabiano Caruana (United States)	2808	0	0	½	½	½	0	1		½	½	3½	1			2713	3
9	Viswanathan Anand (India)	2816	½	½	0	½	½	0	½	½		½	3½	0			2712	2
10	Wesley So (United States)	2779	0	0	0	0	½	1	½	½	½		3				2671	1

== 2016 ==
The 4th Sinquefield Cup was played between August 4 and 16, 2016. It was rescheduled due to a clash with the 2016 Baku Chess Olympiad. This Sinquefield Cup is one of the tournaments of the 2nd Grand Chess Tour. Ding Liren was selected as the Wild Card for the Sinquefield Cup. Vladimir Kramnik withdrew from Sinquefield Cup for health reasons. Fellow Russian player Peter Svidler replaced him.

The prize fund was US$300,000, with $75,000 for 1st place, and points toward the overall 2016 Grand Chess Tour. Players received 120 minutes for 40 moves then 60 minutes for the rest of the game with an additional 30 seconds added per move starting from move 41. In case of a 2-way tie, a 2-game Rapid Match (10 minutes + 5 seconds increment starting from Move #1) followed by a 2-game Blitz Match (5 minutes + 2 seconds increment starting from Move #1) if tied again was to be played. If a tie after the Blitz match, an Armageddon game would decide the winner. All ratings listed below are from the August 2016 rating list.

On August 14, 2016, Wesley So won the tournament, with 5½ points out of 9 (+2−0=7), ahead of former World Champions Veselin Topalov and Viswanathan Anand, and former winners Levon Aronian and Fabiano Caruana.

4th Sinquefield Cup, August 4–16 2016, St. Louis, Missouri, United States, Category XXII (2778.6)
	Player	Rating	1	2	3	4	5	6	7	8	9	10	Points	Wins	SB	TPR	Tour Points
1	Wesley So (United States)	2771		½	1	½	½	1	½	½	½	½	5½			2859	13
2	Levon Aronian (Armenia)	2792	½		½	½	½	1	0	½	1	½	5	2	21.75	2820	7.75
3	Veselin Topalov (Bulgaria)	2761	0	½		½	½	½	½	1	1	½	5	2	21.00	2823	7.75
4	Viswanathan Anand (India)	2770	½	½	½		½	½	1	½	½	½	5	1	22.25	2822	7.75
5	Fabiano Caruana (United States)	2807	½	½	½	½		½	½	½	½	1	5	1	21.50	2818	7.75
6	Hikaru Nakamura (United States)	2791	0	0	½	½	½		½	1	½	1	4½	2		2777	4.5
7	Maxime Vachier-Lagrave (France)	2819	½	1	½	0	½	½		½	½	½	4½	1		2774	4.5
8	Ding Liren (China)	2755	½	½	0	½	½	0	½		1	½	4			2738	3
9	Peter Svidler (Russia)	2751	½	0	0	½	½	½	½	0		1	3½			2701	2
10	Anish Giri (Netherlands)	2769	½	½	½	½	0	0	½	½	0		3			2654	1

== 2017 ==
The 5th Sinquefield Cup was played from August 2 to August 11, 2017, and was the third leg of the 2017 Grand Chess Tour. It was won by Maxime Vachier-Lagrave, with 6 points out of 9 (+3−0=6).

5th Sinquefield Cup, August 2–11, 2017, St. Louis, Missouri, United States, Category XXII (2787.7)
	Player	Rating	1	2	3	4	5	6	7	8	9	10	Points	Wins	H2H	TPR	Tour Points
1	Maxime Vachier-Lagrave (France)	2789		1	½	½	½	½	½	½	1	1	6			2907	13
2	Magnus Carlsen (Norway)	2822	0		½	1	1	½	½	½	1	½	5½	3		2862	9
3	Viswanathan Anand (India)	2783	½	½		½	½	½	1	½	½	1	5½	2		2866	9
4	Levon Aronian (Armenia)	2799	½	0	½		½	½	0	1	1	1	5	3		2825	6.5
5	Sergey Karjakin (Russia)	2773	½	0	½	½		1	½	½	1	½	5	2		2828	6.5
6	Peter Svidler (Russia)	2751	½	½	½	½	0		1	½	½	½	4½			2792	5
7	Fabiano Caruana (United States)	2807	½	½	0	1	½	0		½	½	½	4			2747	4
8	Hikaru Nakamura (United States)	2792	½	½	½	0	½	½	½		½	0	3½			2709	3
9	Wesley So (United States)	2810	0	0	½	0	0	½	½	½		1	3	1	1	2665	1.5
10	Ian Nepomniachtchi (Russia)	2751	0	½	0	0	½	½	½	1	0		3	1	0	2672	1.5

== 2018 ==
The 6th Sinquefield Cup was played from August 18 to 28, 2018, and was the fourth leg on the Grand Chess Tour 2018. Carlsen, Caruana and Aronian tied for first, all with 5½ points out of 9 (+2−0=7). The deciding tiebreaker involved the drawing of lots to decide which two players would participate in the playoff for the title. Carlsen objected to this random chance tiebreaker and proposed a three-way playoff. Caruana did not agree to the three-way playoff as he had a playoff with Wesley So for a place at the 2018 London Chess Classic scheduled on the same day (Caruana would qualify to London after beating So in a playoff 1.5–0.5). The trio reached a compromise and agreed to share the title.

6th Sinquefield Cup, August 18–28, 2018, St. Louis, Missouri, United States, Category XXII (2787.5)
	Player	Rating	1	2	3	4	5	6	7	8	9	10	Points	H2H	Wins	Black	TPR	Tour Points
1–3	Magnus Carlsen (Norway)	2842		½	½	½	½	½	½	½	1	1	5½	1	2	0	2861	15
1–3	Fabiano Caruana (United States)	2822	½		½	½	½	½	½	½	1	1	5½	1	2	0	2864	15
1–3	Levon Aronian (Armenia)	2767	½	½		½	1	½	½	½	½	1	5½	1	2	0	2870	15
4	Shakhriyar Mamedyarov (Azerbaijan)	2801	½	½	½		½	½	½	1	½	½	5		1	0	2829	10
5	Alexander Grischuk (Russia)	2766	½	½	0	½		½	½	½	1	½	4½	1	1	1	2790	6
6–7	Maxime Vachier-Lagrave (France)	2779	½	½	½	½	½		½	½	½	½	4½	1	0	0	2788	6
6–7	Viswanathan Anand (India)	2768	½	½	½	½	½	½		½	½	½	4½	1	0	0	2790	6
8	Wesley So (United States)	2780	½	½	½	0	½	½	½		½	½	4		0	0	2745	3
9–10	Hikaru Nakamura (United States)	2777	0	0	½	½	0	½	½	½		½	3	½	0	0	2664	1.5
9–10	Sergey Karjakin (Russia)	2773	0	0	0	½	½	½	½	½	½		3	½	0	0	2664	1.5

== 2019 ==
The 7th Sinquefield Cup was played from August 17 to August 29, 2019, and was the fifth leg of the 2019 Grand Chess Tour. It was won by Ding Liren on tiebreaks, 3–1. Ding Liren and Magnus Carlsen were tied with 6½ points out of 11 (+2−0=9). The prize fund was US$325,000, with $82,500 for 1st place.

7th Sinquefield Cup, August 17–29, 2019, St. Louis, Missouri, United States, Category XXII (2782.5)
	Player	Rating	1	2	3	4	5	6	7	8	9	10	11	12	Points	TB	Place	TPR	GCT Points
1	Ding Liren (China)	2805		½	½	½	1	1	½	½	½	½	½	½	6½	3	1	2845	16½
2	Magnus Carlsen (Norway)	2882	½		½	½	½	½	½	½	1	½	1	½	6½	1	2	2838	16½
3	Viswanathan Anand (India)	2756	½	½		½	½	½	1	½	½	½	½	½	6		3–4	2820	11
4	Sergey Karjakin (Russia)	2750	½	½	½		½	½	½	½	1	½	½	½	6		3–4	2821	11
5	Fabiano Caruana (United States)	2818	0	½	½	½		½	½	½	½	½	½	1	5½		5–8	2779	6½
6	Anish Giri (Netherlands)	2779	0	½	½	½	½		1	½	½	½	½	½	5½		5–8	2782	6½
7	Ian Nepomniachtchi (Russia)	2774	½	½	0	½	½	0		½	0	1	1	1	5½		5–8	2783	6½
8	Shakhriyar Mamedyarov (Azerbaijan)	2764	½	½	½	½	½	½	½		½	½	½	½	5½		5–8	2784	6½
9	Maxime Vachier-Lagrave (France)	2778	½	0	½	0	½	½	1	½		½	½	½	5		9–10	2746	3½
10	Hikaru Nakamura (United States)	2743	½	½	½	½	½	½	0	½	½		½	½	5		9–10	2750	3½
11	Wesley So (United States)	2776	½	0	½	½	½	½	0	½	½	½		½	4½		11–12	2718	1½
12	Levon Aronian (Armenia)	2765	½	½	½	½	0	½	0	½	½	½	½		4½		11–12	2719	1½

First place playoff, August 29, 2019, St. Louis, Missouri, United States
Place	Player	Rapid rating	Blitz rating	Rapid		Blitz		Score
1	Ding Liren (China)	2786	2779	½	½	1	1	3
2	Magnus Carlsen (Norway)	2895	2920	½	½	0	0	1

== 2021 ==
The 8th Sinquefield Cup was played from August 16 to August 28, 2021, after a break in 2020 due to the COVID-19 pandemic. The tournament was the fifth leg of Grand Chess Tour 2021. It was won by Maxime Vachier-Lagrave, with 6 points out of 9 (+4−1=4).

8th Sinquefield Cup, August 16–28, 2021, St. Louis, Missouri, United States, Category XX (2742.0)
	Player	Rating	1	2	3	4	5	6	7	8	9	10	Points	H2H	Wins	SB	Koya	TPR	Tour Points
1	Maxime Vachier-Lagrave (France)	2751		½	0	½	½	1	1	½	1	1	6		4			2919	13
2	Fabiano Caruana (United States)	2806	½		½	½	½	1	0	1	½	1	5½	1	3			2824	8.3
3	Leinier Domínguez (United States)	2758	1	½		½	½	½	½	½	½	1	5½	1	2	24.00		2829	8.3
4	Wesley So (United States)	2772	½	½	½		½	½	½	½	1	1	5½	1	2	22.75		2828	8.3
5	Richárd Rapport (Hungary)	2763	½	½	½	½		½	½	0	1	½	4½					2740	6
6	Sam Shankland (United States)	2709	0	0	½	½	½		½	1	½	½	4	1½				2701	4
7	Jeffery Xiong (United States)	2710	0	1	½	½	½	½		½	½	0	4	1				2701	4
8	Shakhriyar Mamedyarov (Azerbaijan)	2782	½	0	½	½	1	0	½		½	½	4	½				2693	4
9	Peter Svidler (Russia)	2714	0	½	½	0	0	½	½	½		1	3½					2656	2
10	Dariusz Świercz (United States)	2655	0	0	0	0	½	½	1	½	0		2½					2574	1

== 2022 ==
The 9th Sinquefield Cup was played from September 1 to September 13, 2022, and was the fifth leg of the Grand Chess Tour 2022. Before the start of the fourth round, Magnus Carlsen withdrew from the tournament during the Carlsen–Niemann controversy. Subsequently, the three games he had already played were annulled for the standings of the Sinquefield Cup, but they were still included for rating points. Alireza Firouzja won the tournament after beating Ian Nepomniachtchi in a two game playoff.

In the table, games with Magnus Carlsen are not counted towards the total of each player's points or wins.

9th Sinquefield Cup, September 2–11, 2022, St. Louis, Missouri, United States, Category XXI (2766.6)
	Player	Rating	1	2	3	4	5	6	7	8	9	10	Points	TB	H2H	Wins	SB	Koya	TPR	Tour Points
1	Alireza Firouzja (France)	2778		0	1	½	½	½	1	½	1	–	5	1½					2844	11
2	Ian Nepomniachtchi (FIDE)	2792	1		½	½	½	½	1	½	½	~~0~~	5	½					2804	11
3	Wesley So (United States)	2771	0	½		1	½	1	½	½	½	–	4½		1				2799	7.5
4	Fabiano Caruana (United States)	2758	½	½	0		½	1	½	1	½	–	4½		0				2801	7.5
5	Leinier Domínguez (United States)	2745	½	½	½	½		½	½	½	½	–	4						2758	6
6	Hans Niemann (United States)	2678	½	½	0	0	½		½	½	1	~~1~~	3½		½	1	13.50		2775	4.5
7	Levon Aronian (United States)	2759	0	0	½	½	½	½		1	½	~~½~~	3½		½	1	12.75		2727	4.5
8	Maxime Vachier-Lagrave (France)	2757	½	½	½	0	½	½	0		½	–	3		½	0	12.50		2665	2.5
9	Shakhriyar Mamedyarov (Azerbaijan)	2757	0	½	½	½	½	0	½	½		–	3		½	0	12.25		2665	2.5
10	Magnus Carlsen (Norway)	2861	–	~~1~~	–	–	–	~~0~~	~~½~~	–	–		—N/a						2746	–

First place playoff
Place	Player	Rapid rating	Rapid		Score
1	Alireza Firouzja (FRA)	2732	½	1	1½
2	Ian Nepomniachtchi (FIDE)	2779	½	0	½

== 2023 ==
The 10th Sinquefield Cup was played from November 21 to November 30, 2023, and was the fifth and final leg of the Grand Chess Tour 2023. Jan-Krzysztof Duda withdrew from the event prior to the second round for health reasons. As a result, all players other than Anish Giri (who played Duda in the first round) played eight games with one bye round. Fabiano Caruana won the tournament, scoring 5.5 out of a possible 8 points.

In the table, games with Jan-Krzysztof Duda are not counted towards the total of each player's points or wins.

10th Sinquefield Cup, November 21–30, 2023, St. Louis, Missouri, United States, Category XXI (2753.2)
	Player	Rating	1	2	3	4	5	6	7	8	9	10	Points	TB	Wins	SB	Koya	Tour Points
1	Fabiano Caruana (United States)	2795		½	1	½	½	½	½	1	1	–	5½		3			13
2	Leinier Domínguez (United States)	2745	½		½	½	½	½	1	½	1	–	5		2			10
3	Wesley So (United States)	2752	0	½		½	½	1	½	½	1	–	4½		2			8
4	Ian Nepomniachtchi (FIDE)	2771	½	½	½		½	½	½	½	½	–	4					6
5	Maxime Vachier-Lagrave (France)	2734	½	½	½	½		½	½	½	½	–	4					6
6	Levon Aronian (United States)	2727	½	½	0	½	½		½	1	½	–	4		1			6
7	Anish Giri (Netherlands)	2752	½	0	½	½	½	½		½	½	~~½~~	3½					4
8	Alireza Firouzja (France)	2777	0	½	½	½	½	0	½		½	–	3					3
9	Richárd Rapport (Romania)	2748	0	0	0	½	½	½	½	½		–	2½					2
10	Jan-Krzysztof Duda (Poland)	2731	–	–	–	–	–	–	~~½~~	–	–		—N/a					–

== 2024 ==
The 11th Sinquefield Cup was played from August 19 to August 29, 2024, and was the fifth and final leg of the Grand Chess Tour 2024. 2022 Champion Alireza Firouzja won the event for a second time with an undefeated score (+3−0=6). Firouzja opened the event with a win as black over eventual second place finisher Fabiano Caruana, and was in the sole lead from the 5th round onward.

11th Sinquefield Cup, August 19–29 2024, St. Louis, Missouri, United States, Category XXI (2755.1)
Rank	Player	Rating	1	2	3	4	5	6	7	8	9	10	Points	Tour Points	Prize money	Circuit
1	Alireza Firouzja (France)	2751		1	½	½	½	½	½	1	½	1	6	13	$100,000	28.67
2	Fabiano Caruana (United States)	2793	0		½	1	½	½	½	½	1	1	5½	10	$65,000	20.85
T–3	Maxime Vachier-Lagrave (France)	2721	½	½		½	½	½	½	1	½	½	5	7.5	$40,000	9.12
T–3	Nodirbek Abdusattorov (Uzbekistan)	2762	½	0	½		½	½	1	½	1	½	5	7.5	$40,000	9.12
T–5	Gukesh Dommaraju (India)	2766	½	½	½	½		½	½	½	½	½	4½	5	$21,833	
T–5	R Praggnanandhaa (India)	2749	½	½	½	½	½		½	½	½	½	4½	5	$21,833	
T–5	Wesley So (United States)	2751	½	½	½	0	½	½		½	1	½	4½	5	$21,833	
T–8	Ding Liren (China)	2745	0	½	0	½	½	½	½		½	½	3½	WC (2.5)	$14,500	
T–8	Ian Nepomniachtchi (FIDE)	2767	½	0	½	0	½	½	0	½		1	3½	2.5	$14,500	
10	Anish Giri (Netherlands)	2746	0	0	½	½	½	½	½	½	0		3	1	$10,500	

== 2025 ==
The 12th Sinquefield Cup was played from August 18 to August 28, 2025, and it was the fifth leg of the Grand Chess Tour 2025. There was a three-way tie between Wesley So, R Praggnanandhaa & Fabiano Caruana with 5½/9. Wesley So won the tournament after blitz playoffs, with the help of a victory against R Praggnanandhaa.

12th Sinquefield Cup, August 18–28, St. Louis, Missouri, United States, Category XXI (2750.2)
Pos.	Player	Rating	1	2	3	4	5	6	7	8	9	10	Points	TB	Tour Points	Prize money	Circuit
1	Wesley So (United States)	2745		½	½	½	½	½	½	1	½	1	5½	1½	10	$77,666	23.99
T–2	R Praggnanandhaa (India)	2779	½		½	½	½	½	½	1	1	½	5½	1	10	$67,666	20.72
T–2	Fabiano Caruana (United States)	2784	½	½		½	½	½	½	½	1	1	5½	½	10	$67,666	20.72
4	Levon Aronian (United States)	2737	½	½	½		½	½	½	½	½	1	5		7	$32,000	
T–5	Samuel Sevian (United States)	2683	½	½	½	½		½	½	½	½	½	4½		WC (5)	$21,833	
T–5	Jan-Krzysztof Duda (Poland)	2725	½	½	½	½	½		½	½	0	1	4½		5	$21,833	
T–5	Maxime Vachier-Lagrave (France)	2736	½	½	½	½	½	½		½	½	½	4½		5	$21,833	
8	Gukesh Dommaraju (India)	2776	0	0	½	½	½	½	½		½	1	4		3	$16,000	
9	Alireza Firouzja (France)	2766	½	0	0	½	½	1	½	½		0	3½		2	$13,000	
10	Nodirbek Abdusattorov (Uzbekistan)	2771	0	½	0	0	½	0	½	0	1		2½		1	$10,000	

First place play-off
	Player	Blitz rating	1	2	3	Score
1	Wesley So (United States)	2803		1	½	1½
2	R Praggnanandhaa (India)	2705	0		1	1
3	Fabiano Caruana (United States)	2760	½	0		½

== 2026 ==
The 13th Sinquefield Cup was played from 10 August to 20 August 2026, and it was the fifth leg of the Grand Chess Tour 2026. Wesley So won the tournament after defeating R Praggnanandhaa in the playoffs, where he scored a draw with black pieces in the Armageddon after they drew their rapid games.

13th Sinquefield Cup, August 10–20 St. Louis, Missouri, United States, Category XX (2747.8)
	Player	Rating	1	2	3	4	5	6	7	8	9	10	Points	TB	Tour Points	Prize Money	Circuit
1	Wesley So (United States)	2765		½	½	½	1	½	½	½	½	1	5½	1+A	11	$87,500	23.54
2	R Praggnanandhaa (India)	2750	½		1	0	½	½	1	½	½	1	5½	1	11	$77,500	21.06
T–3	Javokhir Sindarov (Uzbekistan)	2777	½	0		1	½	½	½	½	½	1	5		7.5	$42,500	8.67
T–3	Vincent Keymer (Germany)	2767	½	1	0		1	0	½	½	1	½	5		7.5	$42,500	8.67
T–5	Fabiano Caruana (United States)	2792	0	½	½	0		1	½	½	½	1	4½		4.5	$19,500	
T–5	Levon Aronian (United States)	2721	½	½	½	1	0		½	½	½	½	4½		4.5 (WC)	$19,500	
T–5	Maxime Vachier-Lagrave (France)	2713	½	0	½	½	½	½		1	½	½	4½		4.5	$19,500	
T–5	Samuel Sevian (United States)	2701	½	½	½	½	½	½	0		1	½	4½		4.5 (WC)	$19,500	
9	Anish Giri (Netherlands)	2764	½	½	½	0	½	½	½	0		1	4		2	$12,000	
10	Jorden van Foreest (Netherlands)	2728	0	0	0	½	0	½	½	½	0		2		1	$10,000	

First place play-off
	Player	Rapid rating	1	2	Armageddon	Score
1	Wesley So (United States)	2700	½	½	Draw	1½
2	R Praggnanandhaa (India)	2701	½	½	Draw	1½
