= Super Chess Classic =

Annual chess tournament in Romania

Tournament information
- Sport: Chess
- Location: Bucharest, Romania
- Established: 2021
- Format: Round-robin tournament
- Most championships: (United States) Fabiano Caruana (2)

Current champion
- (Germany) Vincent Keymer

Super Chess Classic is an annual closed chess tournament taking place in Bucharest, Romania. It is a part of the Grand Chess Tour since its inception in 2021. The tournament was formerly known as Superbet Chess Classic.

== Winners ==
#	Year	Winner
1	2021	Shakhriyar Mamedyarov (Azerbaijan)
2	2022	Maxime Vachier-Lagrave (France)
3	2023	Fabiano Caruana (United States)
4	2024	Fabiano Caruana (United States)
5	2025	R Praggnanandhaa (India)
6	2026	Vincent Keymer (Germany)

== 2021 ==
The first edition of the Superbet Chess Classic took place on 3–15 June. It was won by Shakhriyar Mamedyarov from Azerbaijan. It was the first leg of the Grand Chess Tour 2021.

2021 Superbet Chess Classic, 3–15 June Bucharest, Romania, Category XXI (2750.5)
	Player	Rating	1	2	3	4	5	6	7	8	9	10	Points	TPR	Tour Points	Prize money
1	Shakhriyar Mamedyarov (Azerbaijan)	2770		1	½	½	½	½	½	1	1	½	6	2882	13	$90,000
2	Levon Aronian (Armenia)	2781	0		½	1	½	½	1	½	½	½	5	2791	8.3	$45,000
3	Wesley So (United States)	2770	½	½		½	½	½	½	1	½	½	5	2793	8.3	$45,000
4	Alexander Grischuk (Russia)	2776	½	0	½		½	½	1	½	1	½	5	2792	8.3	$45,000
5	Anish Giri (Netherlands)	2780	½	½	½	½		½	½	½	0	1	4½	2747	5.5	$22,500
6	Teimour Radjabov (Azerbaijan)	2765	½	½	½	½	½		½	½	½	½	4½	2749	5.5	$22,500
7	Bogdan-Daniel Deac (Romania)	2627	½	0	½	0	½	½		½	½	1	4	2720	WC (3.5)	$16,250
8	Fabiano Caruana (United States)	2820	0	½	0	½	½	½	½		1	½	4	2698	3.5	$16,250
9	Constantin Lupulescu (Romania)	2656	0	½	½	0	1	½	½	0		½	3½	2672	WC (1.5)	$11,250
10	Maxime Vachier-Lagrave (France)	2760	½	½	½	½	0	½	0	½	½		3½	2660	1.5	$11,250

== 2022 ==
The second edition was held in Bucharest, Romania from 3 to 15 May 2022. Maxime Vachier-Lagrave took first after beating both Levon Aronian and Wesley So in the playoffs.

2022 GCT Superbet Chess Classic, 3–15 May Bucharest, Romania, Category XXI (2761.4)
	Player	Rating	1	2	3	4	5	6	7	8	9	10	Points	TB	TPR	Tour Points	Prize money
1	Maxime Vachier-Lagrave (France)	2750		½	0	½	1	½	½	1	½	1	5½	2	2843	10	$77,677
2	Wesley So (United States)	2766	½		½	½	½	½	1	½	1	½	5½	1	2841	10	$67,677
3	Levon Aronian (United States)	2765	1	½		1	½	½	½	½	½	½	5½	0	2841	10	$67,667
4	Leinier Domínguez (United States)	2753	½	½	0		½	1	½	0	1	½	4½		2762	6	$26,333
5	Fabiano Caruana (United States)	2786	0	½	½	½		½	½	½	1	½	4½		2759	6	$26,333
6	Bogdan-Daniel Deac (Romania)	2671	½	½	½	0	½		½	½	½	1	4½		2771	WC (6)	$26,333
7	Ian Nepomniachtchi (FIDE)	2773	½	0	½	½	½	½		1	0	½	4		2720	3.5	$17,250
8	Alireza Firouzja (France)	2804	0	½	½	1	½	½	0		½	½	4		2717	3.5	$17,250
9	Shakhriyar Mamedyarov (Azerbaijan)	2770	½	0	½	0	0	½	1	½		½	3½		2680	1.5	$11,750
10	Richárd Rapport (Hungary)	2776	0	½	½	½	½	0	½	½	½		3½		2679	1.5	$11,750

First place playoff
Place	Player	Rapid rating	1	2	3	Score
1	Maxime Vachier-Lagrave (France)	2743		1	1	2
2	Wesley So (United States)	2784	0		1	1
3	Levon Aronian (United States)	2751	0	0		0

== 2023 ==
The winner of the tournament was Fabiano Caruana.

2023 GCT Superbet Chess Classic, May 4–16 Bucharest, Romania, Category XXI (2757.1)
	Player	Rating	1	2	3	4	5	6	7	8	9	10	Points	TB	Tour Points	Prize money	Circuit
1	Fabiano Caruana (United States)	2764		½	½	½	½	½	1	½	1	½	5½		13	$100,000	26.84
2	Wesley So (United States)	2760	½		½	½	1	½	½	½	½	½	5		7.75	$42,750	17.44
3	Richárd Rapport (Romania)	2745	½	½		½	½	1	½	½	½	½	5		7.75	$42,750	17.44
4	Anish Giri (Netherlands)	2768	½	½	½		½	½	½	1	½	½	5		7.75	$42,750	17.44
5	Alireza Firouzja (France)	2785	½	0	½	½		0	½	1	1	1	5		7.75	$42,750	17.44
6	Jan-Krzysztof Duda (Poland)	2724	½	½	0	½	1		½	½	½	½	4½		4.5	$19,750	
7	Maxime Vachier-Lagrave (France)	2742	0	½	½	½	½	½		½	1	½	4½		4.5	$19,750	
8	Ding Liren (China)	2789	½	½	½	0	0	½	½		½	1	4		3	$16,000	
9	Ian Nepomniachtchi (FIDE)	2794	0	½	½	½	0	½	0	½		1	3½		2	$13,000	
10	Bogdan-Daniel Deac (Romania)	2700	½	½	½	½	0	½	½	0	0		3		WC (1)	$10,500	

== 2024 ==
The fourth edition was held from June 25–5 July, 2024. It was the second, not first, leg of the Grand Chess Tour 2024, after event in Poland. Fabiano Caruana defended his title, defeating Alireza Firouzja, R Praggnanandhaa and Gukesh Dommaraju in the playoffs.

2024 GCT Superbet Chess Classic, June 25–5 July Bucharest, Romania, Category XX (2750)
	Player	Rating	1	2	3	4	5	6	7	8	9	10	Points	TB	Tour Points	Prize money	Circuit
1	Fabiano Caruana (United States)	2805		1	½	½	0	½	½	½	½	1	5	3	9.25	$68,750	21.23
2	Alireza Firouzja (France)	2737	0		½	½	½	½	½	1	1	½	5	2	9.25	$58,750	14.70
3	Gukesh Dommaraju (India)	2763	½	½		½	½	½	½	½	½	1	5	1	9.25	$58,750	14.70
4	R Praggnanandhaa (India)	2747	½	½	½		1	½	½	½	½	½	5	0	9.25	$58,750	14.70
5	Anish Giri (Netherlands)	2745	1	½	½	0		½	½	½	½	½	4½		5	$21,833	
6	Maxime Vachier-Lagrave (France)	2732	½	½	½	½	½		½	½	½	½	4½		5	$21,833	
7	Ian Nepomniachtchi (FIDE)	2770	½	½	½	½	½	½		½	½	½	4½		5	$21,833	
8	Wesley So (United States)	2757	½	0	½	½	½	½	½		½	½	4		2.5	$14,500	
9	Nodirbek Abdusattorov (Uzbekistan)	2766	½	0	½	½	½	½	½	½		½	4		2.5	$14,500	
10	Bogdan-Daniel Deac (Romania)	2680	0	½	0	½	½	½	½	½	½		3½		WC (1)	$10,500	

First place playoff
Place	Player	Rapid rating	1	2	3	4	Score
1	Fabiano Caruana (United States)	2738		1	1	1	3
2	Alireza Firouzja (France)	2724	0		1	1	2
3	Gukesh Dommaraju (India)	2647	0	0		1	1
4	R Praggnanandhaa (India)	2709	0	0	0		0

== 2025 ==
R Praggnanandhaa won the tournament in playoffs against Alireza Firouzja and Maxime Vachier-Lagrave.

2025 GCT Superbet Chess Classic, May 7–16 Bucharest, Romania
	Player	Rating	1	2	3	4	5	6	7	8	9	10	Points	TB	Tour Points	Prize money	Circuit
1	R Praggnanandhaa (India)	2758		½	½	½	1	1	½	½	½	½	5½	1½	10	$77,666	23.90
2	Alireza Firouzja (France)	2757	½		1	0	½	½	½	1	1	½	5½	1	10	$67,666	20.64
3	Maxime Vachier-Lagrave (France)	2723	½	0		½	½	1	½	½	1	1	5½	½	10	$67,666	20.64
4	Fabiano Caruana (United States)	2776	½	1	½		½	½	½	½	½	½	5		7	$32,000	
5	Nodirbek Abdusattorov (Uzbekistan)	2771	0	½	½	½		½	½	½	½	1	4½		6	$26,000	
6	Wesley So (United States)	2751	0	½	0	½	½		½	1	½	½	4		3.5	$17,125	
7	Levon Aronian (United States)	2747	½	½	½	½	½	½		0	0	1	4		3.5	$17,125	
8	Bogdan-Daniel Deac (Romania)	2668	½	0	½	½	½	0	1		½	½	4		WC (3.5)	$17,125	
9	Gukesh Dommaraju (India)	2787	½	0	0	½	½	½	1	½		½	4		3.5	$17,125	
10	Jan-Krzysztof Duda (Poland)	2739	½	½	0	½	0	½	0	½	½		3		1	$10,500	

First place play-off
	Player	Blitz rating	1	2	3	Score
1	R Praggnanandhaa (India)	2717		½	1	1½
2	Alireza Firouzja (France)	2857	½		½	1
3	Maxime Vachier-Lagrave (France)	2748	0	½		½

== 2026 ==
The tournament from May 14–23. Vincent Keymer took sole first after defeating Jorden van Foreest in final round. Alireza Firouzja fell from the stage after round three, which led to his game against Fabiano Caruana being postponed to the rest day. Firouzja played Caruana and Javokhir Sindarov in his hotel room before withdrawing after round five, resulting in forfeit losses against his remaining opponents.

2026 GCT Super Chess Classic, May 14–23 Bucharest, Romania, Category XX (2743.8)
	Player	Rating	1	2	3	4	5	6	7	8	9	10	Points	Tour Points	Prize Money	Decisive Games Bonus	Circuit
1	Vincent Keymer (Germany)	2759		½	0	½	½	1	1	½	1	+ (Note: Firouzja suffered an ankle injury after Round 3 and eventually withdrew after having played five out of nine games, thereby his remaining games against Keymer, van Foreest, So and Deac resulting in forfeit losses)	6	13	$100,000	$31,250	26.82
2	Fabiano Caruana (United States)	2788	½		½	½	½	½	½	1	½	1	5½	10	$65,000	$20,833	19.50
T–3	Javokhir Sindarov (Uzbekistan)	2776	1	½		½	½	½	1	0	½	½	5	7.5	$42,500	$20,833	8.53
T–3	Wesley So (United States)	2754	½	½	½		½	½	½	½	½	+	5	7.5	$42,500	$0	8.53
T–5	Anish Giri (Netherlands)	2767	½	½	½	½		½	½	½	0	1	4½	4	$18,000	$10,416	
T–5	Maxime Vachier-Lagrave (France)	2717	0	½	½	½	½		½	½	½	1	4½	4	$18,000	$10,416	
T–5	Jorden van Foreest (Netherlands)	2735	0	½	0	½	½	½		½	1	+	4½	4	$18,000	$10,416	
T–5	R Praggnanandhaa (India)	2733	½	0	1	½	½	½	½		½	½	4½	4	$18,000	$10,416	
T–5	Bogdan-Daniel Deac (Romania)	2650	0	½	½	½	1	½	0	½		+	4½	WC (4)	$18,000	$10,416	
10	Alireza Firouzja (France)	2759	-	0	½	-	0	0	-	½	-		1	1	$10,000	$0	
