= Grand Chess Tour 2026 =

Series of chess tournaments

2026 Grand Chess Tour
- 2026
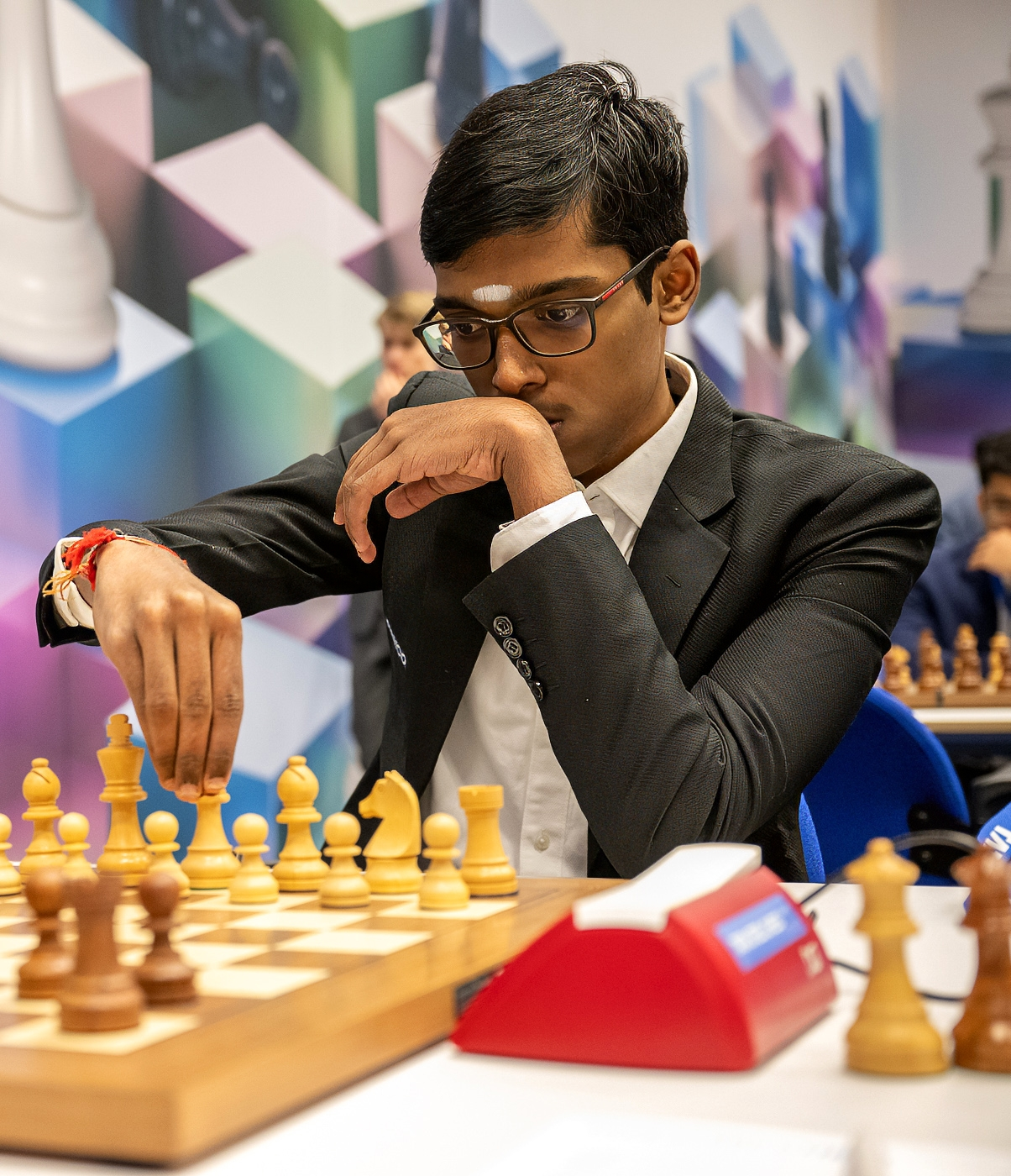
- R Praggnanandhaa, the winner of the Grand Chess Tour 2026

Tournament information
- Dates: 5 May–28 August
- Host(s): Warsaw, Poland; Bucharest, Romania; Zagreb, Croatia; St. Louis, United States

Final positions
- Champion: (India) R Praggnanandhaa
- Runner-up: (United States) Fabiano Caruana
- 3rd place: (United States) Wesley So

Tournament statistics
- Prize money leader: (India) R Praggnanandhaa ($404,354)
- Points leader: (India) R Praggnanandhaa (35.5)

The Grand Chess Tour 2026 was a series of chess tournaments, which was the eleventh edition of the Grand Chess Tour. It consisted of six tournaments with a total prize pool of US$2 million, including two tournaments with classical time control and three tournaments with faster time controls, as well as the GCT Finals in St. Louis.

== Format ==
The tour consisted of six tournaments. Rapid & Blitz tournaments consisted of two parts – rapid (2 points for win, 1 for draw) and blitz (1 point for win, 0.5 for draw). Combined result for both portions were counted in overall standings. Top four after 5 tournaments had qualified to the tour finals in St. Louis.

In the finals, players had played matches consisting of 2 classical games, 2 rapid games and 4 blitz games. 6 points were awarded for a win, 3 points for a draw and 0 points for a loss in classical play. In the rapid games, 4 points were awarded for a win, 2 points for a draw, and 0 points for a loss. In the blitz games, 2 points were awarded for a win, 1 point for a draw and 0 points for a loss.

The tour points were awarded as follows:

Place	Tour Points	Classical prize money	Rapid & Blitz prize money	GCT Finals prize money	Decisive Games Bonuses (Note: Only for regular-season Classical tournaments)
1st	12/13*	$100,000	$50,000	$200,000	$125,000
2nd	10	$65,000	$40,000	$125,000	$125,000
3rd	8	$50,000	$30,000	$75,000	$125,000
4th	7	$35,000	$20,000	$50,000	$125,000
5th	6	$25,000	$15,000		$125,000
6th	5	$20,000	$11,000		$125,000
7th	4	$18,000	$10,000		$125,000
8th	3	$15,000	$9,000		$125,000
9th	2	$12,000	$8,000		$125,000
10th	1	$10,000	$7,000		$125,000

- If a player wins 1st place outright (without the need for a playoff), they are awarded 13 points instead of 12.
- Tour points and prize money are shared equally between tied players.
- Players receive a Decisive Games Bonus for each win scored in regular-season classical tournaments, calculated by multiplying the player's total number of wins by the total bonus prize pool divided by the total number of decisive games.

== Lineup ==
The lineup for the tour was announced on January 27, 2026. It consists of nine players, including the top-three finishers of the previous edition. The remaining six players were selected based on several factors, including URS rating, FIDE rating, and "fighting spirit and sportsmanship".

On March 31, World Champion Gukesh Dommaraju withdrew from the full-tour lineup following a series of poor results, opting to reduce his playing schedule and compete as only a wildcard in the Rapid and Blitz events, Poland and Croatia. As a result, Javokhir Sindarov, who had previously been a wildcard, replaced him as a full-tour member.

On April 23, Levon Aronian withdrew from GCT Romania, as well as from the full-tour lineup due to health reasons, and opted to participate in the Saint Louis events as a wildcard. Jorden van Foreest replaced him in the full-tour lineup.

Player	Country	FIDE rating (Jan 2026)
Fabiano Caruana	United States	2795
Vincent Keymer	Germany	2776
Anish Giri	Netherlands	2760
~~Alireza Firouzja~~	France	2759
R Praggnanandhaa	India	2758
Wesley So	United States	2743
Maxime Vachier-Lagrave	France	2734
Javokhir Sindarov	Uzbekistan	2726
Jorden van Foreest	Netherlands	2703

=== Scheduling conflict with the Esports World Cup ===
On February 10, seven full tour members signed an open letter addressed to the Grand Chess Tour, requesting to adjust the dates of the Sinquefield Cup due to conflict with the chess tournament at the Esports World Cup. On the following day, the Grand Chess Tour declined to reschedule, stating that its schedule had been announced well before that of the Esports World Cup and they were not willing to break their longstanding scheduling commitments.

On July 27, Alireza Firouzja was announced to have withdrawn from the Sinquefield Cup (and thus the overall tour with accordance to the player agreement) due to the unresolved schedule conflict. Samuel Sevian replaced him as a wildcard.

== Results ==
=== Tournament results ===
Dates	Tournament Name	Format	Host city	Winner	Runner-Up	Third Place
May 5–9, 2026	Super Rapid & Blitz Poland	Rapid & blitz	Warsaw	(United States) Hans Niemann (WC)	(United States) Fabiano Caruana	(United States) Wesley So
May 14–23, 2026	Super Chess Classic Romania	Classical	Bucharest	(Germany) Vincent Keymer	(United States) Fabiano Caruana	(Uzbekistan) Javokhir Sindarov (United States) Wesley So
July 1–5, 2026	Super Rapid & Blitz Croatia	Rapid & blitz	Zagreb	(France) Alireza Firouzja	(Uzbekistan) Nodirbek Abdusattorov (WC)	(France) Maxime Vachier-Lagrave (India) R Praggnanandhaa
August 2–6, 2026	Saint Louis Rapid & Blitz	Rapid & blitz	St. Louis	(India) R Praggnanandhaa	(Uzbekistan) Javokhir Sindarov	(United States) Wesley So
August 10–20, 2026	Sinquefield Cup	Classical	St. Louis	(United States) Wesley So	(India) R Praggnanandhaa	(Uzbekistan) Javokhir Sindarov (Germany) Vincent Keymer
August 22–27, 2026	GCT Finals	Classical, Rapid & Blitz	St. Louis	(India) R Praggnanandhaa	(United States) Fabiano Caruana	(United States) Wesley So

=== Tour rankings ===
The wildcards (in italics) are not counted in overall standings.

	Player	POL	ROU	CRO	STL	SIN	Total points	Finals	Prize money
1	R Praggnanandhaa (India)	—N/a	4	7.5	13	11	35.5	1st	$404,354
2	Fabiano Caruana (United States)	10	10	—N/a	5	4.5	29.5	2nd	$297,958
3	Wesley So (United States)	8	7.5	—N/a	8	11	34.5	3rd	$280,625
4	Vincent Keymer (Germany)	—N/a	13	6	2	7.5	28.5	4th	$270,187
5	Javokhir Sindarov (Uzbekistan)	3	7.5	—N/a	10	7.5	28	—N/a	$170,458
6	Maxime Vachier-Lagrave (France)	3	4	7.5	—N/a	4.5	19	—N/a	$89,729
7	Anish Giri (Netherlands)	—N/a	4	4	3	2	13	—N/a	$67,229
8	Jorden van Foreest (Netherlands)	—N/a	4	2	5	1	12	—N/a	$58,416
– (Note: Firouzja withdrew from the Sinquefield Cup after choosing to compete in the Esports World Cup. In accordance with his player agreement, he was also deemed to have withdrawn from the whole tour, and all the tour points earned by him were nullified.)	Alireza Firouzja (France)	~~6~~	~~1~~	~~11~~	—N/a	—N/a	–	—N/a	$72,500
	Hans Niemann (United States)	13	—N/a	—N/a	—N/a	—N/a	13	—N/a	$50,000
	Levon Aronian (United States)	—N/a	—N/a	—N/a	7	4.5	11.5	—N/a	$47,312
	Nodirbek Abdusattorov (Uzbekistan)	—N/a	—N/a	11	—N/a	—N/a	11	—N/a	$42,500
	Gukesh Dommaraju (India)	5	—N/a	5	—N/a	—N/a	10	—N/a	$22,000
	Vladimir Fedoseev (Slovenia)	7	—N/a	—N/a	—N/a	—N/a	7	—N/a	$20,000
	Bogdan-Daniel Deac (Romania)	—N/a	4	3	—N/a	—N/a	7	—N/a	$37,416
	Leinier Dominguez (United States)	—N/a	—N/a	—N/a	5	—N/a	5	—N/a	$12,000
	Samuel Sevian (United States)	—N/a	—N/a	—N/a	—N/a	4.5	4.5	—N/a	$27,312
	Jan-Krzysztof Duda (Poland)	3	—N/a	—N/a	—N/a	—N/a	3	—N/a	$9,000
	Radosław Wojtaszek (Poland)	1	—N/a	—N/a	—N/a	—N/a	1	—N/a	$7,000
	Ivan Šarić (Croatia)	—N/a	—N/a	1	—N/a	—N/a	1	—N/a	$7,000
	Awonder Liang (United States)	—N/a	—N/a	—N/a	1	—N/a	1	—N/a	$7,000

== Tournaments ==
=== Super Rapid & Blitz Poland ===
The first leg of the Grand Chess Tour was held in Warsaw, Poland from May 5–9.

2026 GCT Super Rapid & Blitz Poland, May 5–9 Warsaw, Poland
	Player	Rapid	Blitz	Total	TB	Tour Points	Prize money	Circuit
1	Hans Niemann (USA)	13	9½	22½		WC (13)	$50,000	12.96
2	Fabiano Caruana (USA)	9	13	22		10	$40,000	9.43
3	Wesley So (USA)	12	9	21		8	$30,000	8.25
4	Vladimir Fedoseev (SLO)	11	7	18		WC (7)	$20,000	
5	Alireza Firouzja (FRA)	6	11½	17½		6	$15,000	
6	Gukesh Dommaraju (IND)	9	8	17		WC (5)	$11,000	
T–7	Javokhir Sindarov (UZB)	8	8½	16½		3	$9,000	
T–7	Maxime Vachier-Lagrave (FRA)	8	8½	16½		3	$9,000	
T–7	Jan-Krzysztof Duda (POL)	9	7½	16½		WC (3)	$9,000	
10	Radosław Wojtaszek (POL)	5	7½	12½		WC (1)	$7,000	

2026 GCT Super Rapid & Blitz Poland – Rapid, May 5–7 Warsaw, Poland
	Player	Rating	1	2	3	4	5	6	7	8	9	10	Points
1	Hans Niemann (USA)	2646		1	1	2	2	2	1	1	2	1	13
2	Wesley So (USA)	2705	1		2	0	1	1	1	2	2	2	12
3	Vladimir Fedoseev (SLO)	2690	1	0		2	1	1	2	0	2	2	11
T–4	Fabiano Caruana (USA)	2727	0	2	0		1	0	2	1	1	2	9
T–4	Jan-Krzysztof Duda (POL)	2683	0	1	1	1		0	1	1	2	2	9
T–4	Gukesh Dommaraju (IND)	2682	0	1	1	2	2		0	2	1	0	9
T–7	Maxime Vachier-Lagrave (FRA)	2735	1	1	0	0	1	2		2	0	1	8
T–7	Javokhir Sindarov (UZB)	2727	1	0	2	1	1	0	0		1	2	8
9	Alireza Firouzja (FRA)	2755	0	0	0	1	0	1	2	1		1	6
10	Radosław Wojtaszek (POL)	2612	1	0	0	0	0	2	1	0	1		5

2026 GCT Super Rapid & Blitz Poland – Blitz, May 8–9 Warsaw, Poland
	Player	Rating	1	2	3	4	5	6	7	8	9	10	Points
1	Fabiano Caruana (USA)	2749		1 ½	0 1	½ 0	1 ½	1 1	1 1	0 1	1 1	½ 1	13
2	Alireza Firouzja (FRA)	2796	0 ½		1 0	1 1	½ 0	1 1	1 1	1 0	½ 1	½ ½	11½
3	Hans Niemann (USA)	2699	1 0	0 1		0 ½	½ ½	1 1	0 0	0 1	0 1	1 1	9½
4	Wesley So (USA)	2798	½ 1	0 0	1 ½		½ 1	½ ½	0 0	½ 1	1 ½	0 ½	9
T–5	Javokhir Sindarov (UZB)	2662	0 ½	½ 1	½ ½	½ 0		0 ½	1 1	½ 1	½ 0	½ 0	8½
T–5	Maxime Vachier-Lagrave (FRA)	2761	0 0	0 0	0 0	½ ½	1 ½		½ ½	1 1	½ ½	1 1	8½
7	Gukesh Dommaraju (IND)	2646	0 0	0 0	1 1	1 1	0 0	½ ½		0 ½	1 1	½ 0	8
T–8	Radosław Wojtaszek (POL)	2558	1 0	0 1	1 0	½ 0	½ 0	0 0	1 ½		0 0	1 1	7½
T–8	Jan-Krzysztof Duda (POL)	2743	0 0	½ 0	1 0	0 ½	½ 1	½ ½	0 0	1 1		0 1	7½
10	Vladimir Fedoseev (SLO)	2756	½ 0	½ ½	0 0	1 ½	½ 1	0 0	½ 1	0 0	1 0		7

=== Super Chess Classic Romania ===
The second leg of the 2026 Grand Chess Tour was held in Bucharest, Romania from May 14–23.

2026 GCT Super Chess Classic, May 14–23 Bucharest, Romania, Category XX (2743.8)
	Player	Rating	1	2	3	4	5	6	7	8	9	10	Points	Tour Points	Prize Money	Decisive Games Bonus	Circuit
1	Vincent Keymer (GER)	2759		½	0	½	½	1	1	½	1	+ (Note: Firouzja suffered an ankle injury after Round 3 and eventually withdrew after having played five out of nine games, thereby his remaining games against Keymer, van Foreest, So and Deac resulting in forfeit losses)	6	13	$100,000	$31,250	26.82
2	Fabiano Caruana (USA)	2788	½		½	½	½	½	½	1	½	1	5½	10	$65,000	$20,833	19.50
T–3	Javokhir Sindarov (UZB)	2776	1	½		½	½	½	1	0	½	½	5	7.5	$42,500	$20,833	8.53
T–3	Wesley So (USA)	2754	½	½	½		½	½	½	½	½	+	5	7.5	$42,500	$0	8.53
T–5	Anish Giri (NED)	2767	½	½	½	½		½	½	½	0	1	4½	4	$18,000	$10,416	
T–5	Maxime Vachier-Lagrave (FRA)	2717	0	½	½	½	½		½	½	½	1	4½	4	$18,000	$10,417	
T–5	Jorden van Foreest (NED)	2735	0	½	0	½	½	½		½	1	+	4½	4	$18,000	$10,416	
T–5	R Praggnanandhaa (IND)	2733	½	0	1	½	½	½	½		½	½	4½	4	$18,000	$10,416	
T–5	Bogdan-Daniel Deac (ROU)	2650	0	½	½	½	1	½	0	½		+	4½	WC (4)	$18,000	$10,416	
10	Alireza Firouzja (FRA)	2759	-	0	½	-	0	0	-	½	-		1	1	$10,000	$0	

=== Super Rapid & Blitz Croatia ===
The third leg of the Grand Chess Tour was held in Zagreb, Croatia from July 1–5.

2026 GCT Super Rapid & Blitz Croatia, July 1–5 Zagreb, Croatia
	Player	Rapid	Blitz	Total	TB	Tour Points	Prize money	Circuit
1	Alireza Firouzja (FRA)	12	11½	23½	2	11	$47,500	10.58
2	Nodirbek Abdusattorov (UZB)	11	12½	23½	1	WC (11)	$42,500	9.47
T–3	Maxime Vachier-Lagrave (FRA)	11	10½	21½		7.5	$25,000	3.90
T–3	R Praggnanandhaa (IND)	12	9½	21½		7.5	$25,000	3.90
5	Vincent Keymer (GER)	10	10	20		6	$15,000	
6	Gukesh Dommaraju (IND)	10	8½	18½		WC (5)	$11,000	
7	Anish Giri (NED)	8	9	17		4	$10,000	
8	Bogdan-Daniel Deac (ROM)	7	8	15		WC (3)	$9,000	
9	Jorden van Foreest (NED)	7	5½	12½		2	$8,000	
10	Ivan Šarić (CRO)	2	5	7		WC (1)	$7,000	

2026 GCT Super Rapid & Blitz Croatia – Rapid, July 1–3 Zagreb, Croatia
	Player	Rating	1	2	3	4	5	6	7	8	9	10	Points
1	Alireza Firouzja (FRA)	2748		2	1	0	1	2	1	2	1	2	12
2	R Praggnanandhaa (IND)	2690	0		1	0	1	2	2	2	2	2	12
3	Maxime Vachier-Lagrave (FRA)	2701	1	1		1	2	1	1	2	1	1	11
4	Nodirbek Abdusattorov (UZB)	2686	2	2	1		1	0	1	1	1	2	11
5	Gukesh Dommaraju (IND)	2684	1	1	0	1		1	2	0	2	2	10
6	Vincent Keymer (GER)	2627	0	0	1	2	1		1	1	2	2	10
7	Anish Giri (NED)	2664	1	0	1	1	0	1		1	2	1	8
8	Bogdan-Daniel Deac (ROM)	2613	0	0	0	1	2	1	1		0	2	7
9	Jorden van Foreest (NED)	2597	1	0	1	1	0	0	0	2		2	7
10	Ivan Šarić (CRO)	2595	0	0	1	0	0	0	1	0	0		2

2026 GCT Super Rapid & Blitz Croatia – Blitz, July 4–5 Zagreb, Croatia
	Player	Rating	1	2	3	4	5	6	7	8	9	10	Points
1	Nodirbek Abdusattorov (UZB)	2820		0 ½	1 ½	1 ½	0 ½	1 1	1 1	1 ½	½ 1	½ 1	12½
2	Alireza Firouzja (FRA)	2791	1 ½		½ 0	1 0	1 0	½ ½	1 1	1 ½	1 0	1 1	11½
3	Maxime Vachier-Lagrave (FRA)	2730	0 ½	½ 1		1 0	1 0	½ ½	1 0	1 ½	½ 1	½ 1	10½
4	Vincent Keymer (GER)	2621	0 ½	0 1	0 1		0 1	0 ½	1 ½	0 ½	1 1	1 1	10
5	R Praggnanandhaa (IND)	2712	1 ½	0 1	0 1	1 0		½ ½	0 0	0 1	0 1	1 1	9½
6	Anish Giri (NED)	2642	0 0	½ ½	½ ½	1 ½	½ ½		½ 0	½ ½	½ 1	½ 1	9
7	Gukesh Dommaraju (IND)	2655	0 0	0 0	0 1	0 ½	1 1	½ 1		½ 1	1 0	1 0	8½
8	Bogdan-Daniel Deac (ROM)	2649	0 ½	0 ½	0 ½	1 ½	1 0	½ ½	½ 0		1 ½	½ ½	8
9	Jorden van Foreest (NED)	2687	½ 0	0 1	½ 0	0 0	1 0	½ 0	0 1	0 ½		0 ½	5½
10	Ivan Šarić (CRO)	2600	½ 0	0 0	½ 0	0 0	0 0	½ 0	0 1	½ ½	1 ½		5

First place play-off
	Player	Rapid rating	1	2	Armageddon	Score
1	Alireza Firouzja (FRA)	2748	½	½	Win	2
2	Nodirbek Abdusattorov (UZB)	2686	½	½	Loss	1

=== Saint Louis Rapid & Blitz ===
The fourth leg of the Grand Chess Tour was held in St. Louis, United States from August 2–6.

2026 GCT Saint Louis Rapid & Blitz, August 2–6 St. Louis, Missouri, United States
	Player	Rapid	Blitz	Total	TB	Tour Points	Prize money	Circuit
1	R Praggnanandhaa (IND)	12	11½	23½		13	$50,000	13.67
2	Javokhir Sindarov (UZB)	11	11	22		10	$40,000	9.94
3	Wesley So (USA)	10	10½	20½		8	$30,000	8.70
4	Levon Aronian (USA)	9	10	19		WC (7)	$20,000	
T–5	Fabiano Caruana (USA)	8	9	17		5	$12,000	
T–5	Jorden van Foreest (NED)	8	9	17		5	$12,000	
T–5	Leinier Domínguez (USA)	9	8	17		WC (5)	$12,000	
8	Anish Giri (NED)	9	6½	15½		3	$9,000	
9	Vincent Keymer (GER)	9	5½	14½		2	$8,000	
10	Awonder Liang (USA)	5	9	14		WC (1)	$7,000	

2026 GCT Saint Louis Rapid & Blitz – Rapid, August 2–4 St. Louis, Missouri, United States
	Player	Rating	1	2	3	4	5	6	7	8	9	10	Points
1	R Praggnanandhaa (IND)	2701		1	1	1	1	2	2	2	0	2	12
2	Javokhir Sindarov (UZB)	2730	1		1	1	1	1	1	1	2	2	11
3	Wesley So (USA)	2700	1	1		1	1	1	1	2	0	2	10
4	Leinier Domínguez (USA)	2655	1	1	1		1	1	1	1	1	1	9
5	Anish Giri (NED)	2659	1	1	1	1		1	1	1	1	1	9
6	Vincent Keymer (GER)	2637	0	1	1	1	1		1	1	2	1	9
7	Levon Aronian (USA)	2750	0	1	1	1	1	1		1	2	1	9
8	Fabiano Caruana (USA)	2701	0	1	0	1	1	1	1		1	2	8
9	Jorden van Foreest (NED)	2596	2	0	2	1	1	0	0	1		1	8
10	Awonder Liang (USA)	2549	0	0	0	1	1	1	1	0	1		5

2026 GCT Saint Louis Rapid & Blitz – Blitz, August 5–6 St. Louis, Missouri, United States
	Player	Rating	1	2	3	4	5	6	7	8	9	10	Points
1	R Praggnanandhaa (IND)	2707		½ ½	½ ½	½ ½	½ ½	½ 0	1 1	1 1	½ 1	1 ½	11½
2	Javokhir Sindarov (UZB)	2716	½ ½		½ ½	½ ½	1 0	1 ½	0 1	1 ½	½ 1	½ 1	11
3	Wesley So (USA)	2764	½ ½	½ ½		0 1	0 1	½ ½	1 ½	1 ½	½ 0	1 1	10½
4	Levon Aronian (USA)	2715	½ ½	½ ½	1 0		1 1	½ 1	0 0	1 0	1 ½	0 1	10
5	Fabiano Caruana (USA)	2741	½ ½	0 1	1 0	0 0		1 1	½ ½	½ ½	½ 0	1 ½	9
6	Awonder Liang (USA)	2565	½ 1	0 ½	½ ½	½ 0	0 0		1 0	1 ½	1 1	½ ½	9
7	Jorden van Foreest (NED)	2653	0 0	1 0	0 ½	1 1	½ ½	0 1		½ 0	1 1	1 0	9
8	Leinier Domínguez (USA)	2591	0 0	0 ½	0 ½	0 1	½ ½	0 ½	½ 1		½ ½	1 1	8½
9	Anish Giri (NED)	2655	½ 0	½ 0	½ 1	0 ½	½ 1	0 0	0 0	½ ½		½ ½	6½
10	Vincent Keymer (GER)	2650	0 ½	½ 0	0 0	1 0	0 ½	½ ½	0 1	0 0	½ ½		5½

=== Sinquefield Cup ===
The 13th edition of the Sinquefield Cup was the fifth leg of the Grand Chess Tour, it was held in St. Louis, United States from August 10–20.

2026 GCT Sinquefield Cup, August 10–20 St. Louis, Missouri, United States, Category XX (2747.8)
	Player	Rating	1	2	3	4	5	6	7	8	9	10	Points	TB	Tour Points	Prize Money	Decisive Games bonus	Circuit
1	Wesley So (USA)	2765		½	½	½	1	½	½	½	½	1	5½	1+A	11	$87,500	$15,625	23.54
2	R Praggnanandhaa (IND)	2750	½		1	0	½	½	1	½	½	1	5½	1	11	$77,500	$23,438	21.06
T–3	Javokhir Sindarov (UZB)	2777	½	0		1	½	½	½	½	½	1	5		7.5	$42,500	$15,625	8.67
T–3	Vincent Keymer (GER)	2767	½	1	0		1	0	½	½	1	½	5		7.5	$42,500	$23,437	8.67
T–5	Fabiano Caruana (USA)	2792	0	½	½	0		1	½	½	½	1	4½		4.5	$19,500	$15,625	
T–5	Levon Aronian (USA)	2721	½	½	½	1	0		½	½	½	½	4½		4.5 (WC)	$19,500	$7,812	
T–5	Maxime Vachier-Lagrave (FRA)	2713	½	0	½	½	½	½		1	½	½	4½		4.5	$19,500	$7,813	
T–5	Samuel Sevian (USA)	2701	½	½	½	½	½	½	0		1	½	4½		4.5 (WC)	$19,500	$7,812	
9	Anish Giri (NED)	2764	½	½	½	0	½	½	½	0		1	4		2	$12,000	$7,813	
10	Jorden van Foreest (NED)	2728	0	0	0	½	0	½	½	½	0		2		1	$10,000	$0	

First place play-off
	Player	Rapid rating	1	2	Armageddon	Score
1	Wesley So (USA)	2700	½	½	Draw	1½
2	R Praggnanandhaa (IND)	2701	½	½	Draw	1½

=== Grand Finals ===
The GCT Finals were held in St. Louis, United States from August 22–27.

Semifinals
1	(India) R Praggnanandhaa	9	8	2	19
4	(Germany) Vincent Keymer	3	0	6	9
2	(United States) Wesley So	6	4	2	12
3	(United States) Fabiano Caruana	8	4	6	18

Finals
1	(India) R Praggnanandhaa	3	8	4	15
3	(United States) Fabiano Caruana	9	0	4	13
Third place
4	(Germany) Vincent Keymer	8	4	0	12
2	(United States) Wesley So	6	4	8	18

== See also ==
- List of strong chess tournaments
