= Jacobsz =

Jacobsz is a surname. Notable people with the surname include:

- Dirck Jacobsz (1496–1567), Dutch Renaissance painter
- Francois Paul Jacobsz, South African politician
- Jan Jacobsz Graeff (1570/75 – after 1620), Dutch patrician
- Lambert Jacobsz (1598–1636), Dutch painter and preacher
- Laurens Jacobsz van der Vinne (1712– 1742), Dutch painter
