= Tata Steel Chess Tournament 2017 =

Chess tournament 2017

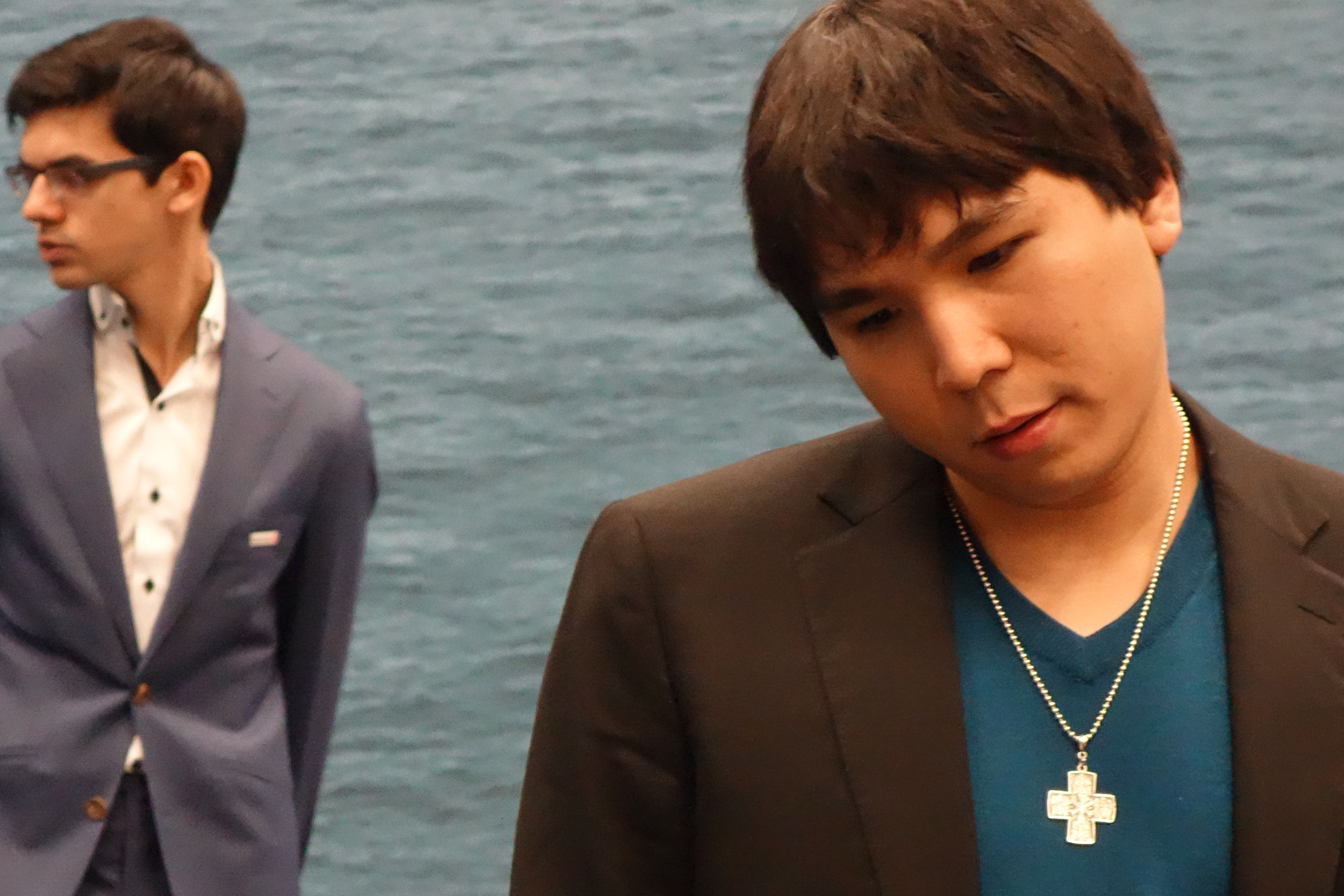
- Wesley So in 2017
- Location: Wijk aan Zee, Netherlands
- Dates: 14–29 January 2017
- Competitors: 28
- Winning score: 9 points of 13

Champion
- (United States) Wesley So (Masters) (England) Gawain Jones (Challengers)

The Tata Steel Chess Tournament 2017 was the 79th edition of the Tata Steel Chess Tournament. It was held in Wijk aan Zee (with away days in Rotterdam and Haarlem) from 14 to 29 January 2017.

The tournament was won by Wesley So, who finished one point ahead of defending champion Magnus Carlsen.

79th Tata Steel Masters, 14–29 January 2017, Wijk aan Zee — Haarlem — Rotterdam, Netherlands, Cat. XXI (2751)
| | Player | Rating | 1 | 2 | 3 | 4 | 5 | 6 | 7 | 8 | 9 | 10 | 11 | 12 | 13 | 14 | Total | SB | TPR |
|---|---|---|---|---|---|---|---|---|---|---|---|---|---|---|---|---|---|---|---|
| 1 | Wesley So (United States) | 2808 | | ½ | ½ | ½ | ½ | ½ | ½ | ½ | 1 | ½ | 1 | 1 | 1 | 1 | 9 | | 2888 |
| 2 | Magnus Carlsen (Norway) | 2840 | ½ | | ½ | ½ | 1 | ½ | 1 | ½ | ½ | ½ | 1 | ½ | 0 | 1 | 8 | | 2831 |
| 3 | Adhiban Baskaran (India) | 2653 | ½ | ½ | | ½ | ½ | 1 | 0 | ½ | 0 | 1 | 1 | ½ | 1 | ½ | 7½ | 47.00 | 2816 |
| 4 | Levon Aronian (Armenia) | 2780 | ½ | ½ | ½ | | ½ | 0 | 1 | 1 | ½ | 0 | ½ | ½ | 1 | 1 | 7½ | 46.00 | 2806 |
| 5 | Wei Yi (China) | 2706 | ½ | 0 | ½ | ½ | | 1 | ½ | ½ | ½ | ½ | 0 | 1 | 1 | 1 | 7½ | 44.75 | 2812 |
| 6 | Sergey Karjakin (Russia) | 2785 | ½ | ½ | 0 | 1 | 0 | | ½ | ½ | ½ | 1 | ½ | ½ | ½ | 1 | 7 | 43.00 | 2777 |
| 7 | Pavel Eljanov (Ukraine) | 2755 | ½ | 0 | 1 | 0 | ½ | ½ | | ½ | ½ | ½ | ½ | ½ | 1 | 1 | 7 | 42.00 | 2780 |
| 8 | Anish Giri (Netherlands) | 2773 | ½ | ½ | ½ | 0 | ½ | ½ | ½ | | ½ | ½ | ½ | 1 | ½ | ½ | 6½ | | 2749 |
| 9 | Pentala Harikrishna (India) | 2766 | 0 | ½ | 1 | ½ | ½ | ½ | ½ | ½ | | ½ | ½ | ½ | ½ | 0 | 6 | 40.00 | 2721 |
| 10 | Dmitry Andreikin (Russia) | 2736 | ½ | ½ | 0 | 1 | ½ | 0 | ½ | ½ | ½ | | ½ | ½ | ½ | ½ | 6 | 39.00 | 2723 |
| 11 | Radosław Wojtaszek (Poland) | 2750 | 0 | 0 | 0 | ½ | 1 | ½ | ½ | ½ | ½ | ½ | | ½ | ½ | 1 | 6 | 35.75 | 2722 |
| 12 | Ian Nepomniachtchi (Russia) | 2767 | 0 | ½ | ½ | ½ | 0 | ½ | ½ | 0 | ½ | ½ | ½ | | ½ | ½ | 5 | | 2663 |
| 13 | Richárd Rapport (Hungary) | 2702 | 0 | 1 | 0 | 0 | 0 | ½ | 0 | ½ | ½ | ½ | ½ | ½ | | ½ | 4½ | | 2645 |
| 14 | Loek van Wely (Netherlands) | 2695 | 0 | 0 | ½ | 0 | 0 | 0 | 0 | ½ | 1 | ½ | 0 | ½ | ½ | | 3½ | | 2580 |

2017 Tata Steel Challengers, 14–29 January 2017, Wijk aan Zee, Netherlands, Category XIV (2593)
| | Player | Rating | 1 | 2 | 3 | 4 | 5 | 6 | 7 | 8 | 9 | 10 | 11 | 12 | 13 | 14 | Total | SB | TPR |
|---|---|---|---|---|---|---|---|---|---|---|---|---|---|---|---|---|---|---|---|
| 1 | GM Gawain Jones (England) | 2665 | | 1 | 0 | 1 | ½ | 0 | 1 | ½ | ½ | 1 | 1 | 1 | ½ | 1 | 9 | 52.75 | 2728 |
| 2 | GM Markus Ragger (Austria) | 2697 | 0 | | 1 | 1 | ½ | ½ | ½ | ½ | ½ | ½ | 1 | 1 | 1 | 1 | 9 | 51.50 | 2726 |
| 3 | GM Jeffery Xiong (United States) | 2667 | 1 | 0 | | 0 | ½ | 1 | 0 | ½ | 1 | ½ | 1 | 1 | 1 | 1 | 8½ | | 2697 |
| 4 | GM Eric Hansen (Canada) | 2603 | 0 | 0 | 1 | | 1 | 1 | ½ | ½ | ½ | ½ | 1 | 1 | ½ | ½ | 8 | 49.00 | 2679 |
| 5 | GM Lu Shanglei (China) | 2612 | ½ | ½ | ½ | 0 | | 0 | 1 | ½ | 1 | 1 | 1 | 1 | ½ | ½ | 8 | 47.75 | 2678 |
| 6 | GM Ilya Smirin (Israel) | 2667 | 1 | ½ | 0 | 0 | 1 | | 0 | ½ | ½ | 1 | ½ | 1 | 1 | 1 | 8 | 45.25 | 2674 |
| 7 | GM Aryan Tari (Norway) | 2584 | 0 | ½ | 1 | ½ | 0 | 1 | | ½ | ½ | ½ | ½ | ½ | 1 | 1 | 7½ | | 2650 |
| 8 | GM Erwin l'Ami (Netherlands) | 2605 | ½ | ½ | ½ | ½ | ½ | ½ | ½ | | ½ | ½ | ½ | 0 | 1 | 1 | 7 | 42.50 | 2621 |
| 9 | GM Nils Grandelius (Sweden) | 2642 | ½ | ½ | 0 | ½ | 0 | ½ | ½ | ½ | | ½ | 1 | ½ | 1 | 1 | 7 | 38.50 | 2618 |
| 10 | GM Benjamin Bok (Netherlands) | 2608 | 0 | ½ | ½ | ½ | 0 | 0 | ½ | ½ | ½ | | 0 | ½ | 1 | 1 | 5½ | | 2535 |
| 11 | GM Vladimir Dobrov (Russia) | 2499 | 0 | 0 | 0 | 0 | 0 | ½ | ½ | ½ | 0 | 1 | | 0 | 1 | 1 | 4½ | | 2490 |
| 12 | GM Jorden van Foreest (Netherlands) | 2612 | 0 | 0 | 0 | 0 | 0 | 0 | ½ | 1 | ½ | ½ | 1 | | 0 | ½ | 4 | | 2450 |
| 13 | WGM Lei Tingjie (China) | 2467 | ½ | 0 | 0 | ½ | ½ | 0 | 0 | 0 | 0 | 0 | 0 | 1 | | 1 | 3½ | | 2427 |
| 14 | IM Sopiko Guramishvili (Georgia) | 2370 | 0 | 0 | 0 | ½ | ½ | 0 | 0 | 0 | 0 | 0 | 0 | ½ | 0 | | 1½ | | 2274 |
