= Grand Chess Tour 2021 =

Grand Chess Tour
- 2021
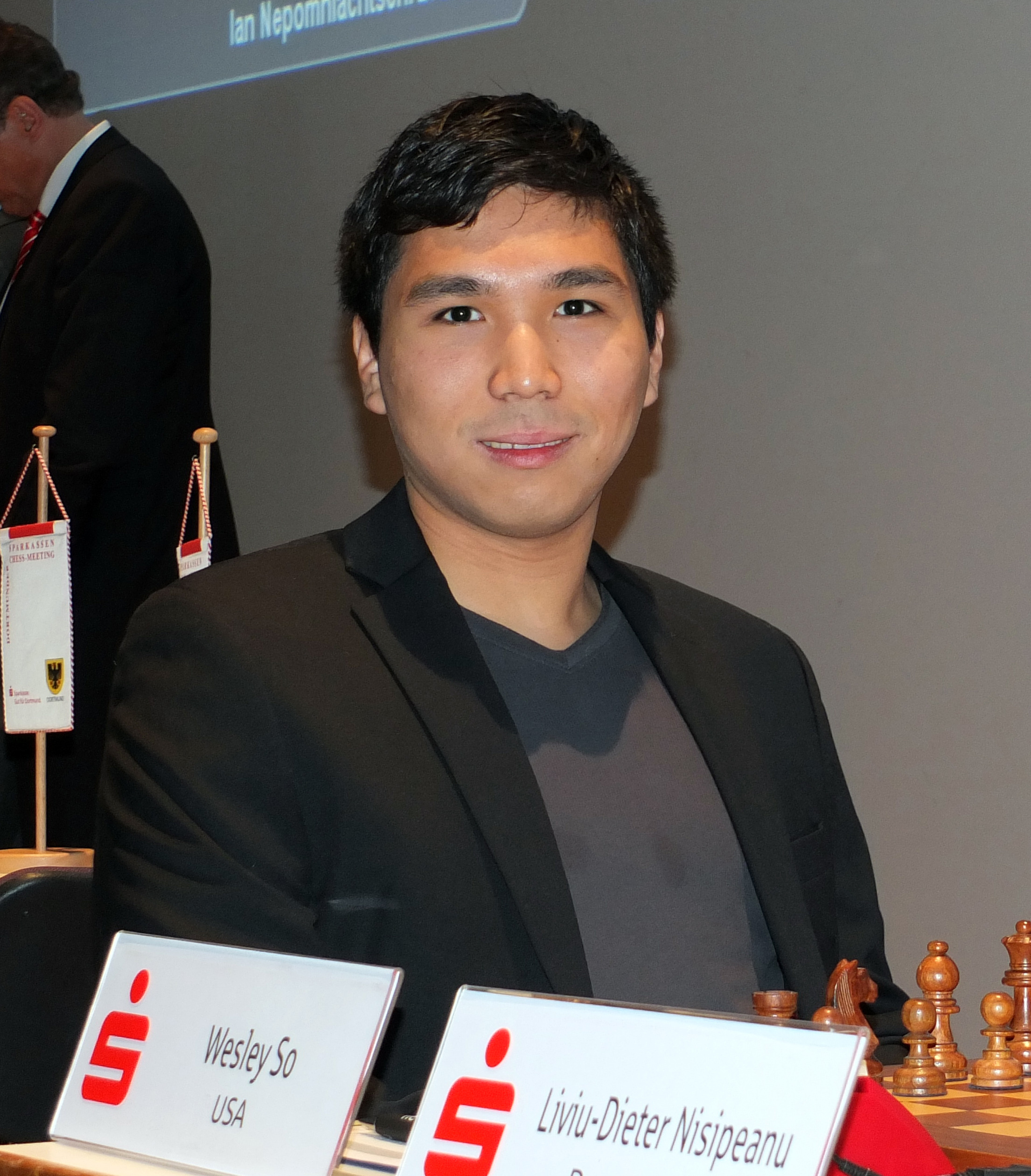
- 2021 Grand Chess Tour winner Wesley So.

Tournament information
- Dates: 3 June–27 August 2021
- Host(s): Bucharest; Paris; Zagreb; St. Louis

Final positions
- Champion: (United States) Wesley So
- Runner-up: (France) Maxime Vachier-Lagrave
- 3rd place: (Azerbaijan) Shakhriyar Mamedyarov

Tournament statistics
- Most tournament titles: (France) Maxime Vachier-Lagrave (2)
- Prize money leader: (United States) Wesley So ($242,500)
- Points leader: (United States) Wesley So (36.6)

The Grand Chess Tour 2021 was a series of chess tournaments, which was sixth edition of Grand Chess Tour. It consisted five tournaments, including two tournaments with classical time control and three tournaments with faster time controls. It was won by American grandmaster Wesley So.

== Format ==
Tour consists five tournaments, two classicals and three rapid & blitz, respectively. Rapid & Blitz tournaments consisted two parts – rapid (2 points for win, 1 for draw) and blitz (1 point for win, 0.5 for draw). Combined result for both portions was counted in overall standings. The tour points are awarded as follows:

Place	Points
1st	12/13*
2nd	10
3rd	8
4th	7
5th	6
6th	5
7th	4
8th	3
9th	2
10th	1

- If a player wins 1st place outright (without the need for a playoff), they are awarded 13 points instead of 12.
- Tour points are shared equally between tied players.

== Lineup ==
The lineup was announced on January 13, 2021. Initially, ten players were invited as regular participants, with only difference from cancelled 2020 edition being the absence of Magnus Carlsen and Hikaru Nakamura and participation of Shakhriyar Mamedyarov and Teimour Radjabov. Later, Ding Liren has withdrawn from the Tour due to COVID-19 travel restrictions in China, being replaced by Richárd Rapport. After winning the Candidates Tournament 2020–2021 and qualifying for the World Chess Championship 2021, Ian Nepomniachtchi also withdrew from the Tour, reducing number of regular participants to nine.

Player	Country	FIDE Rating (January 2021)
Fabiano Caruana	United States	2823
Maxime Vachier-Lagrave	France	2784
Wesley So	United States	2770
Alexander Grischuk	Russia	2777
Levon Aronian	Armenia	2781
Shakhriyar Mamedyarov	Azerbaijan	2770
Teimour Radjabov	Azerbaijan	2765
Anish Giri	Netherlands	2764
Richárd Rapport	Hungary	2759

== Schedule ==
Dates	Tournament Name	Host city
3 June – 15 June 2021	Superbet Chess Classic	Bucharest
20 June – 24 June 2021	Paris Rapid & Blitz	Paris
7 July – 11 July 2021	Croatia Rapid & Blitz	Zagreb
11 August – 16 August 2021	Saint Louis Rapid & Blitz	St. Louis
17 August – 27 August 2021	Sinquefield Cup	St. Louis

== Results ==
Dates	Tournament Name	Winner	Runner-up	Third place
3 June – 15 June 2021	Superbet Chess Classic	Shakhriyar Mamedyarov	Levon Aronian; Wesley So; Alexander Grischuk	–
20 June – 24 June 2021	Paris Rapid & Blitz	Wesley So	Ian Nepomniachtchi (WC)	Maxime Vachier-Lagrave; Alireza Firouzja (WC)
7 July – 11 July 2021	Croatia Rapid & Blitz	Maxime Vachier-Lagrave	Viswanathan Anand (WC)	Anish Giri
11 August – 16 August 2021	Saint Louis Rapid & Blitz	Hikaru Nakamura (WC)	Fabiano Caruana	Richard Rapport
17 August – 27 August 2021	Sinquefield Cup	Maxime Vachier-Lagrave	Fabiano Caruana; Leinier Domínguez (WC); Wesley So	–

== Tournaments ==
=== Superbet Chess Classic ===
The first leg of the 2021 Grand Chess Tour was held in Bucharest, Romania in 3–15 June. It was won by Shakhriyar Mamedyarov from Azerbaijan.

2021 Superbet Chess Classic, 3–15 June Bucharest, Romania, Category XXI (2750.5)
	Player	Rating	1	2	3	4	5	6	7	8	9	10	Points	TPR	Tour Points	Prize money
1	Shakhriyar Mamedyarov (AZE)	2770		1	½	½	½	½	½	1	1	½	6	2882	13	$90,000
2	Levon Aronian (ARM)	2781	0		½	1	½	½	1	½	½	½	5	2791	8.3	$45,000
3	Wesley So (USA)	2770	½	½		½	½	½	½	1	½	½	5	2793	8.3	$45,000
4	Alexander Grischuk (RUS)	2776	½	0	½		½	½	1	½	1	½	5	2792	8.3	$45,000
5	Anish Giri (NED)	2780	½	½	½	½		½	½	½	0	1	4½	2747	5.5	$22,500
6	Teimour Radjabov (AZE)	2765	½	½	½	½	½		½	½	½	½	4½	2749	5.5	$22,500
7	Bogdan-Daniel Deac (ROU)	2627	½	0	½	0	½	½		½	½	1	4	2720	WC (3.5)	$16,250
8	Fabiano Caruana (USA)	2820	0	½	0	½	½	½	½		1	½	4	2698	3.5	$16,250
9	Constantin Lupulescu (ROU)	2656	0	½	½	0	1	½	½	0		½	3½	2672	WC (1.5)	$11,250
10	Maxime Vachier-Lagrave (FRA)	2760	½	½	½	½	0	½	0	½	½		3½	2660	1.5	$11,250

=== Paris Rapid & Blitz ===
The second leg of the 2021 Grand Chess Tour was won by Wesley So.

2021 GCT Paris Rapid & Blitz, 20–24 June 2021, Paris, France
	Player	Rapid	Blitz	Total	Tour Points	Prize money
1	Wesley So (USA)	12	12½	24½	13	$37,500
2	Ian Nepomniachtchi (RUS)	11	10½	21½	WC (10)	$25,000
T-3	Maxime Vachier-Lagrave (FRA)	9	9	18	7.5	$17,500
T-3	Alireza Firouzja (FIDE)	7	11	18	WC (7.5)	$17,500
T-5	Levon Aronian (ARM)	8	9½	17½	5.5	$11,250
T-5	Richard Rapport (HUN)	8	9½	17½	5.5	$11,250
7	Peter Svidler (RUS)	9	8	17	WC (4)	$9,000
8	Fabiano Caruana (USA)	8	8½	16½	3	$8,000
9	Etienne Bacrot (FRA); Vladimir Kramnik (RUS) (Note: Bacrot and Kramnik competed as a team, with Bacrot playing the Rapid portion and Kramnik playing the Blitz portion.)	10	5½	15½	WC (2)	$7,000
10	Teimour Radjabov (AZE)	8	6	14	1	$6,000

2021 GCT Paris Rapid & Blitz – Rapid, 20–22 June 2021, Paris, France
	Player	Rating	1	2	3	4	5	6	7	8	9	10	Points
1	Wesley So (USA)	2741		1	1	1	2	1	2	1	2	1	12
2	Ian Nepomniachtchi (RUS)	2778	1		2	1	0	2	1	2	1	1	11
3	Etienne Bacrot (FRA)	2667	1	0		1	2	0	2	1	2	1	10
4	Peter Svidler (RUS)	2742	1	1	1		2	2	0	1	0	1	9
5	Maxime Vachier-Lagrave (FRA)	2860	0	2	0	0		1	1	2	1	2	9
6	Levon Aronian (ARM)	2778	1	0	2	0	1		1	1	1	1	8
7	Fabiano Caruana (USA)	2773	0	1	0	2	1	1		1	1	1	8
8	Teimour Radjabov (AZE)	2758	1	0	1	1	0	1	1		1	2	8
9	Richard Rapport (HUN)	2727	0	1	0	2	1	1	1	1		1	8
10	Alireza Firouzja (FIDE)	2703	1	1	1	1	0	1	1	0	1		7

2021 GCT Paris Rapid & Blitz – Blitz, 23–24 June 2021, Paris, France
	Player	Rating	1	2	3	4	5	6	7	8	9	10	Points
1	Wesley So (USA)	2816		1 1	½ 1	0 1	½ ½	1 1	½ ½	½ ½	1 ½	½ 1	12½
2	Alireza Firouzja (FIDE)	2770	0 0		1 1	1 ½	1 0	1 0	0 0	½ 1	1 1	1 1	11
3	Ian Nepomniachtchi (RUS)	2785	½ 0	0 0		1 ½	½ ½	½ 1	1 ½	½ 1	1 ½	1 ½	10½
4	Levon Aronian (ARM)	2739	1 0	0 ½	0 ½		½ 1	0 1	½ ½	1 ½	1 0	½ 1	9½
5	Richard Rapport (HUN)	2759	½ ½	0 1	½ ½	½ 0		½ ½	½ 1	0 ½	½ 1	1 ½	9½
6	Maxime Vachier-Lagrave (FRA)	2822	0 0	0 1	½ 0	1 0	½ ½		1 ½	0 ½	½ 1	1 1	9
7	Fabiano Caruana (USA)	2711	½ ½	1 1	0 ½	½ ½	½ 0	0 ½		½ 1	0 1	½ 0	8½
8	Peter Svidler (RUS)	2754	½ ½	½ 0	½ 0	0 ½	1 ½	1 ½	½ 0		1 0	0 1	8
9	Teimour Radjabov (AZE)	2757	0 ½	0 0	0 ½	0 1	½ 0	½ 0	1 0	0 1		1 0	6
10	Vladimir Kramnik (RUS)	2797	½ 0	0 0	0 ½	½ 0	0 ½	0 0	½ 1	1 0	0 1		5½

=== Croatia Rapid & Blitz ===
The third leg of the Grand Chess Tour was held in Zagreb, Croatia in 7-11 July, 2021. It had a lot of attention from media because of participation of former World Chess Champion Garry Kasparov. The event was won by French grandmaster Maxime Vachier-Lagrave.

2021 Croatia GCT Rapid & Blitz, 7–11 July 2021, Zagreb, Croatia
	Player	Rapid	Blitz	Total	Tour Points	Prize money
1	Maxime Vachier-Lagrave (FRA)	10	13	23	13	$37,500
2	Viswanathan Anand (IND)	9	12	21	WC (10)	$25,000
3	Anish Giri (NED)	10	10½	20½	8	$20,000
T-4	Ian Nepomniachtchi (RUS)	11	9	20	WC (6.5)	$13,750
T-4	Jan-Krzysztof Duda (POL)	10	10	20	WC (6.5)	$13,750
6	Shakhriyar Mamedyarov (AZE)	9	10	19	10	$10,000
7	Alexander Grischuk (RUS)	8	10	18	4	$9,000
8	Anton Korobov (UKR)	7	8½	15½	WC (3)	$8,000
9	Ivan Šarić (CRO); Garry Kasparov (RUS/CRO) (Note: Šarić and Kasparov competed as a team, with Šarić playing the Rapid portion and Kasparov playing the Blitz portion.)	10	2½	12½	WC (2)	$7,000
10	Jorden van Foreest (NED)	6	4½	10½	WC (1)	$6,000

2021 Croatia GCT Rapid & Blitz – Rapid, 7–9 July 2021, Zagreb, Croatia
	Player	Rating	1	2	3	4	5	6	7	8	9	10	Points
1	Ian Nepomniachtchi (RUS)	2791		0	1	1	1	2	1	2	2	1	11
2	Ivan Šarić (CRO)	2650	2		1	1	2	1	1	1	0	1	10
3	Maxime Vachier-Lagrave (FRA)	2831	1	1		2	1	0	2	1	1	1	10
4	Jan-Krzysztof Duda (POL)	2774	1	1	0		1	2	1	1	2	1	10
5	Anish Giri (NED)	2731	1	0	1	1		1	2	1	2	1	10
6	Shakhriyar Mamedyarov (AZE)	2761	0	1	2	0	1		1	1	1	2	9
7	Viswanathan Anand (IND)	2753	1	1	0	1	0	1		1	2	2	9
8	Alexander Grischuk (RUS)	2784	0	1	1	1	1	1	1		1	1	8
9	Anton Korobov (UKR)	2781	0	2	1	0	0	1	0	1		2	7
10	Jorden van Foreest (NED)	2543	1	1	1	1	1	0	0	1	0		6

2021 Croatia GCT Rapid & Blitz – Blitz, 10–11 July 2021, Zagreb, Croatia
	Player	Rating	1	2	3	4	5	6	7	8	9	10	Points
1	Maxime Vachier-Lagrave (FRA)	2794		½ ½	0 1	1 ½	1 ½	½ 1	1 ½	½ 1	1 ½	1 1	13
2	Viswanathan Anand (IND)	2785	½ ½		0 ½	½ ½	½ ½	1 ½	0 1	1 1	1 1	1 1	12
3	Anish Giri (NED)	2744	1 0	1 ½		½ ½	½ 1	½ 0	½ 1	0 1	½ ½	1 ½	10½
4	Alexander Grischuk (RUS)	2765	0 ½	½ ½	½ ½		1 0	½ 1	½ ½	1 0	½ 1	½ 1	10
5	Shakhriyar Mamedyarov (AZE)	2716	0 ½	½ ½	½ 0	0 1		0 1	1 1	0 0	1 1	1 1	10
6	Jan-Krzysztof Duda (POL)	2799	½ 0	0 ½	½ 1	½ 0	1 0		0 1	1 1	0 1	1 1	10
7	Ian Nepomniachtchi (RUS)	2807	0 ½	1 0	½ 0	½ ½	0 0	1 0		1 1	1 ½	1 ½	9
8	Anton Korobov (UKR)	2668	½ 0	0 0	1 0	0 1	1 1	0 0	0 0		1 1	1 1	8½
9	Jorden van Foreest (NED)	2622	0 ½	0 0	½ ½	½ 0	0 0	1 0	0 ½	0 0		1 0	4½
10	Garry Kasparov (RUS/CRO)	2801	0 0	0 0	0 ½	½ 0	0 0	0 0	0 ½	0 0	0 1		2½

=== Saint Louis Rapid & Blitz ===
2021 Saint Louis Rapid & Blitz, 12–16 August 2021, St. Louis, Missouri, United States
	Player	Rapid	Blitz	Total	Tour Points	Prize money
1	Hikaru Nakamura (USA)	12	12	24	WC (13)	$37,500
2	Fabiano Caruana (USA)	11	10	21	10	$25,000
3	Richard Rapport (HUN)	11	8½	19½	8	$20,000
4	Wesley So (USA)	9	9½	18½	7	$15,000
5	Lê Quang Liêm (VIE)	6	11½	17½	WC (6)	$12,500
T-6	Shakhriyar Mamedyarov (AZE)	8	9	17	4.5	$9,500
T-6	Leinier Domínguez (USA)	7	10	17	WC (4.5)	$9,500
8	Peter Svidler (RUS)	9	7	16	WC (3)	$8,000
9	Jeffery Xiong (USA)	8	7	15	WC (2)	$7,000
10	Sam Shankland (USA)	9	5½	14½	WC (1)	$6,000

2021 Saint Louis Rapid & Blitz – Rapid, 12–14 August 2021, St. Louis, Missouri, United States
	Player	Rating	1	2	3	4	5	6	7	8	9	10	Points
1	Hikaru Nakamura (USA)	2829		1	2	1	2	1	1	1	2	1	12
2	Richard Rapport (HUN)	2724	1		2	1	1	2	1	2	0	1	11
3	Fabiano Caruana (USA)	2758	0	0		2	1	0	2	2	2	2	11
4	Wesley So (USA)	2774	1	1	0		1	2	1	1	1	1	9
5	Peter Svidler (RUS)	2745	0	1	1	1		1	0	1	2	2	9
6	Sam Shankland (USA)	2609	1	0	2	0	1		2	0	1	2	9
7	Shakhriyar Mamedyarov (AZE)	2756	1	1	0	1	2	0		1	2	0	8
8	Jeffery Xiong (USA)	2730	1	0	0	1	1	2	1		0	2	8
9	Leinier Domínguez (USA)	2786	0	2	0	1	0	1	0	2		1	7
10	Lê Quang Liêm (VIE)	2744	1	1	0	1	0	0	2	0	1		6

2021 Saint Louis Rapid & Blitz – Blitz, 15–16 August 2021, St. Louis, Missouri, United States
	Player	Rating	1	2	3	4	5	6	7	8	9	10	Points
1	Hikaru Nakamura (USA)	2900		1 ½	½ ½	½ 1	½ ½	½ 1	½ ½	1 1	½ ½	1 ½	12
2	Lê Quang Liêm (VIE)	2690	0 ½		1 0	0 0	½ ½	½ ½	1 1	1 1	1 1	1 1	11½
3	Leinier Domínguez (USA)	2654	½ ½	0 1		½ 1	½ 0	1 0	0 1	1 ½	½ 1	½ ½	10
4	Fabiano Caruana (USA)	2734	½ 0	1 1	½ 0		1 1	0 ½	½ ½	0 ½	0 1	1 1	10
5	Wesley So (USA)	2861	½ ½	½ ½	½ 1	0 0		1 0	½ ½	1 ½	1 ½	0 1	9½
6	Shakhriyar Mamedyarov (AZE)	2755	½ 0	½ ½	0 1	1 ½	0 1		½ 0	½ 1	1 0	1 0	9
7	Richard Rapport (HUN)	2776	½ ½	0 0	1 0	½ ½	½ ½	½ 1		0 ½	0 1	½ 1	8½
8	Jeffery Xiong (USA)	2724	0 0	0 0	0 ½	1 0	0 ½	½ 0	1 ½		1 ½	1 0	7
9	Peter Svidler (RUS)	2743	½ ½	0 0	½ 0	1 0	0 ½	0 1	1 0	0 ½		½ 1	7
10	Sam Shankland (USA)	2704	0 ½	0 0	½ ½	0 0	1 0	0 1	½ 0	0 1	½ 0		5½

=== Sinquefield Cup ===
2021 Sinquefield Cup, 16–28 August St. Louis, Missouri, United States, Category XX (2742.0)
	Player	Rating	1	2	3	4	5	6	7	8	9	10	Points	TPR	Tour Points	Prize money
1	Maxime Vachier-Lagrave (FRA)	2751		½	0	½	½	1	1	½	1	1	6	2919	13	$90,000
2	Fabiano Caruana (USA)	2806	½		½	½	½	1	0	1	½	1	5½	2824	8.3	$45,000
3	Leinier Domínguez (USA)	2758	1	½		½	½	½	½	½	½	1	5½	2829	WC (8.3)	$45,000
4	Wesley So (USA)	2772	½	½	½		½	½	½	½	1	1	5½	2828	8.3	$45,000
5	Richard Rapport (HUN)	2763	½	½	½	½		½	½	0	1	½	4½	2740	6	$25,000
6	Sam Shankland (USA)	2709	0	0	½	½	½		½	1	½	½	4	2701	WC (4)	$17,500
7	Jeffery Xiong (USA)	2710	0	1	½	½	½	½		½	½	0	4	2701	WC (4)	$17,500
8	Shakhriyar Mamedyarov (AZE)	2782	½	0	½	½	1	0	½		½	½	4	2693	4	$17,500
9	Peter Svidler (RUS)	2714	0	½	½	0	0	½	½	½		1	3½	2656	WC (2)	$12,500
10	Dariusz Świercz (USA)	2655	0	0	0	0	½	½	1	½	0		2½	2574	WC (1)	$10,000

== Standings ==
The wildcards (in italics) are not counted in overall standings.

	Player	ROU	PAR	CRO	STL	SIN	Total points	Prize money
1	Wesley So (United States)	8.3	13	—	7	8.3	36.6	$242,500
2	Maxime Vachier-Lagrave (France)	1.5	7.5	13	—	13	35	$206,250
3	Shakhriyar Mamedyarov (Azerbaijan)	13	—	5	4.5	4	26.5	$152,000
4	Fabiano Caruana (United States)	3.5	3	—	10	8.3	24.8	$94,250
5	Richárd Rapport (Hungary)	—	5.5	—	8	6	19.5	$42,500
6	Levon Aronian (Armenia)	8.3	5.5	—	—	—	13.8	$56,250
7	Anish Giri (Netherlands)	5.5	—	8	—	—	13.5	$42,500
8	Alexander Grischuk (Russia)	8.3	—	4	—	—	12.3	$54,000
9	Teimour Radjabov (Azerbaijan)	5.5	1	—	—	—	6.5	$28,500
	Ian Nepomniachtchi (Russia)	—	10	6.5	—	—	16.5	$36,750
	Hikaru Nakamura (United States)	—	—	—	13	—	13	$37,500
	Leinier Domínguez Pérez (United States)	—	—	—	4.5	8.3	12.8	$54,500
	Viswanathan Anand (India)	—	—	10	—	—	10	$25,000
	Peter Svidler (Russia)	—	4	—	3	2	9	$29,000
	Alireza Firouzja (FIDE)	—	7.5	—	—	—	7.5	$17,500
	Jan-Krzysztof Duda (Poland)	—	—	6.5	—	—	6.5	$11,250
	Lê Quang Liêm (Vietnam)	—	—	—	6	—	6	$12,500
	Jeffery Xiong (United States)	—	—	—	2	4	6	$24,500
	Sam Shankland (United States)	—	—	—	1	4	5	$23,500
	Bogdan-Daniel Deac (Romania)	3.5	—	—	—	—	3.5	$16,250
	Anton Korobov (Ukraine)	—	—	3	—	—	3	$8,000
	Etienne Bacrot (France); Vladimir Kramnik (Russia)	—	2	—	—	—	2	$7,000
	Ivan Šarić (Croatia); Garry Kasparov (RUS/CRO)	—	—	2	—	—	2	$7,000
	Constantin Lupulescu (Romania)	1.5	—	—	—	—	1.5	$11,250
	Jorden van Foreest (Netherlands)	—	—	1	—	—	1	$6,000
	Dariusz Świercz (United States)	—	—	—	—	1	1	$10,000
