= Leonardo Costa (chess player) =

German chess grandmaster (born 2008)

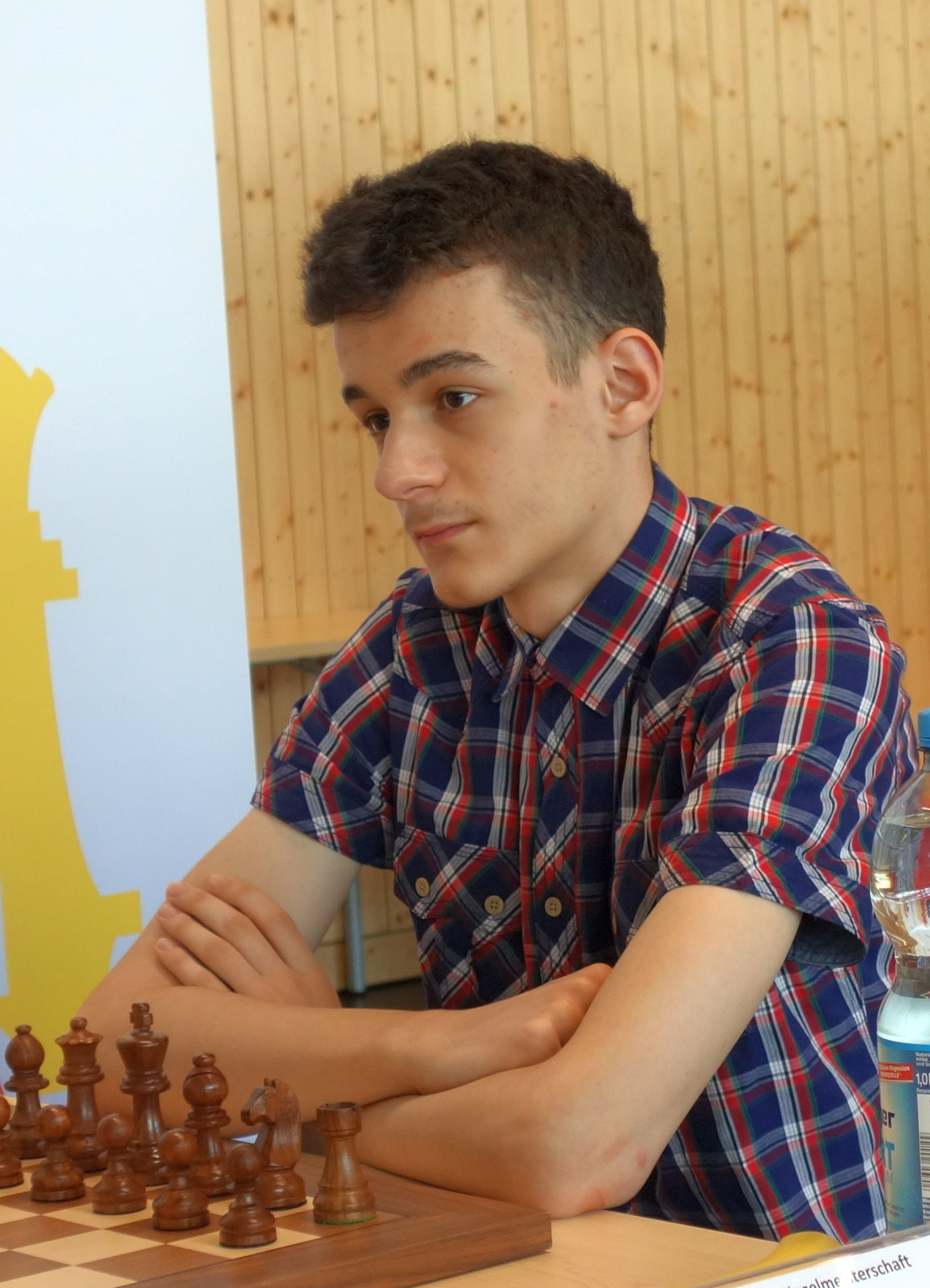
- Leonardo Costa in 2024

Personal information
- Born: January 2008 (age 18) Munich, Germany

Chess career
- Country: Germany
- Title: Grandmaster (2025)
- FIDE rating: 2540 (July 2026)
- Peak rating: 2556 (April 2026)

Leonardo Costa (born January 2008) is a German chess grandmaster. He won the German Chess Championship in 2022 and 2026, and is the youngest German chess champion in tournament history.

== Chess career ==
Leonardo Costa started playing chess at the age of four and a half. He first played against his father Vincenzo, who was soon no longer a match for him. At the age of six he played for the club SK Munich Southeast and also won a youth chess cup at this age against 34 children aged up to under 12 years. In June 2017 he became German Youth Chess Champion in age group U10, in June 2019 German Youth Chess Vice Champion in age group U12 and in August 2021 German Youth Chess Champion in age group U14. In December 2021, the commission for competitive sports of the German Chess Federation decided on special funding for him, with which he should make the leap into the German national chess team and maybe even the top of the world in the long term.

After exceeding the Elo mark of 2300 in September 2021, he received his first FIDE title with the FIDE Master. His highest Elo rating was 2393 in December 2021.

At the 93rd German Chess Championship in Magdeburg 2022, Costa won, although only placed 24th, in a field with several International Master and Grandmasters and won the title of German master. This meant that he became eligible to participate in the (much higher-ranking) German Masters in 2023. He won the German Chess Championship again in 2026.

At the World Youth Chess Championship in agr group 14 in 2022 in Mamaia, he finished 18th after retiring in the last round in a single draw, completely winning; otherwise, he would have shared third place.

Initially, Nadya Yusupov was his coach; since 2018 this is mainly Michael Prusikin.

== Personal life ==
Costa lives with his parents and a sister in Neubiberg near Munich. According to his own statements, he is a good, but not an outstanding, student.
