= Jan Jacobsz Graeff =

Jan Jacobsz Graeff (1570/75 - Alblasserdam, after 1620) belonged to the Dutch patrician class, and was a member of the executive board of the Zijpe water board.

== Biography ==
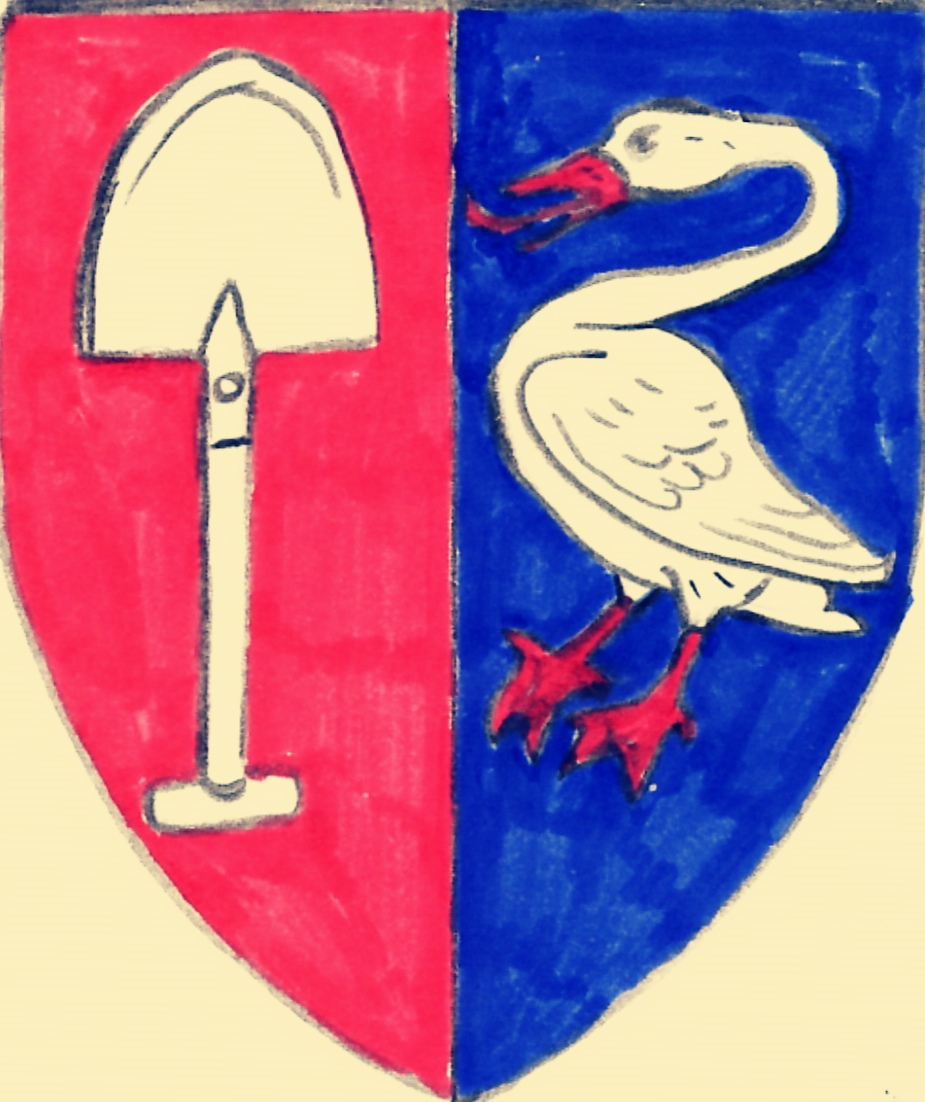
Coat of arms Graeff (ancient). The family coat of arms with the silver spade on a red (Von Graben) and silver swan on a blue background (De Grebber) was first documented in 1543 by Jan Pietersz Graeff.

=== Origin ===
Jan Jacobsz Graeff founded the Alblasserdam branch of the De Graeff family. He was a son of Jacob Jansz Graeff (died 1580) and Geertge Claes Coppensdr van Ouder Amstel, and a grandson of Jan Pietersz Graeff. He had three siblings. His sister Styntje (Stijntje) Jacobsdr Graeff married to Hendrik Stuijver, Lord of Ravensberg (died 1590), and afterwards to Herman Roswinkel. Beside his full brother Claes Jacobsz Graeff he had another brother from an illegitimate relationship of his father, Adriaan Jacobsz Graeff, who had descendants, who are said to have moved to Prussia, Saxony and Austria.

Jan Jacobsz father - Jacob Jansz Graeff - was a younger brother of Lenaert Jansz de Graeff, a leading Watergeus, and Dirck Jansz Graeff, burgomaster of Amsterdam.

=== Family ===
Jan Jacobsz Graeff, who was also a cousin of Amsterdam regent Jacob Dircksz de Graeff, married Trijn Simons Comans (died 1613), the couple had four children:

- Claes Jansz Graeff
  - Albert Claesz de Graeff (born around 1620), rear admiral at the Admiralty of Amsterdam
- Adriana Jansdr Graeff (died after 1640), married to Reynier Adriaansz Coetenburgh (died 1633), who was hoofdingeland of the Wieringerwaard, heemraad and hoofdingeland of the Zijpe, heemraad of the Heerhugowaard and of the Hazedwarsdijk, alderman of Alkmaar (between 1619-1625)
- Maria Jansdr Graeff
- Cornelis Jansz Graeff, married to Adriana Jans Pauw and Maria van der Veen
  - Catharina de Graeff (overleden 1653) trouwde met Jan van Egmond van der Nienburg
  - Pieter Cornelisz Graeff (died 1679) → Descendants
  - Jan Cornelisz (de) Graeff → Descendants

Jan Jacobsz Graeffs descendants were related to the families Boelens Loen, Van Foreest, Van Wijk, Cromhout, to Rent Bardes, and to Andries Ramp.

Jan Jacobsz Graeff held various positions, including as hoogheemraad of the Zijpe.

== Literature ==
- Graeff, P. de (P. de Graeff Gerritsz en Dirk de Graeff van Polsbroek) Genealogie van de familie De Graeff van Polsbroek, Amsterdam 1882.
- Bruijn, J. H. de Genealogie van het geslacht De Graeff van Polsbroek 1529/1827
