= Laurens Jacobsz van der Vinne =

Dutch painter

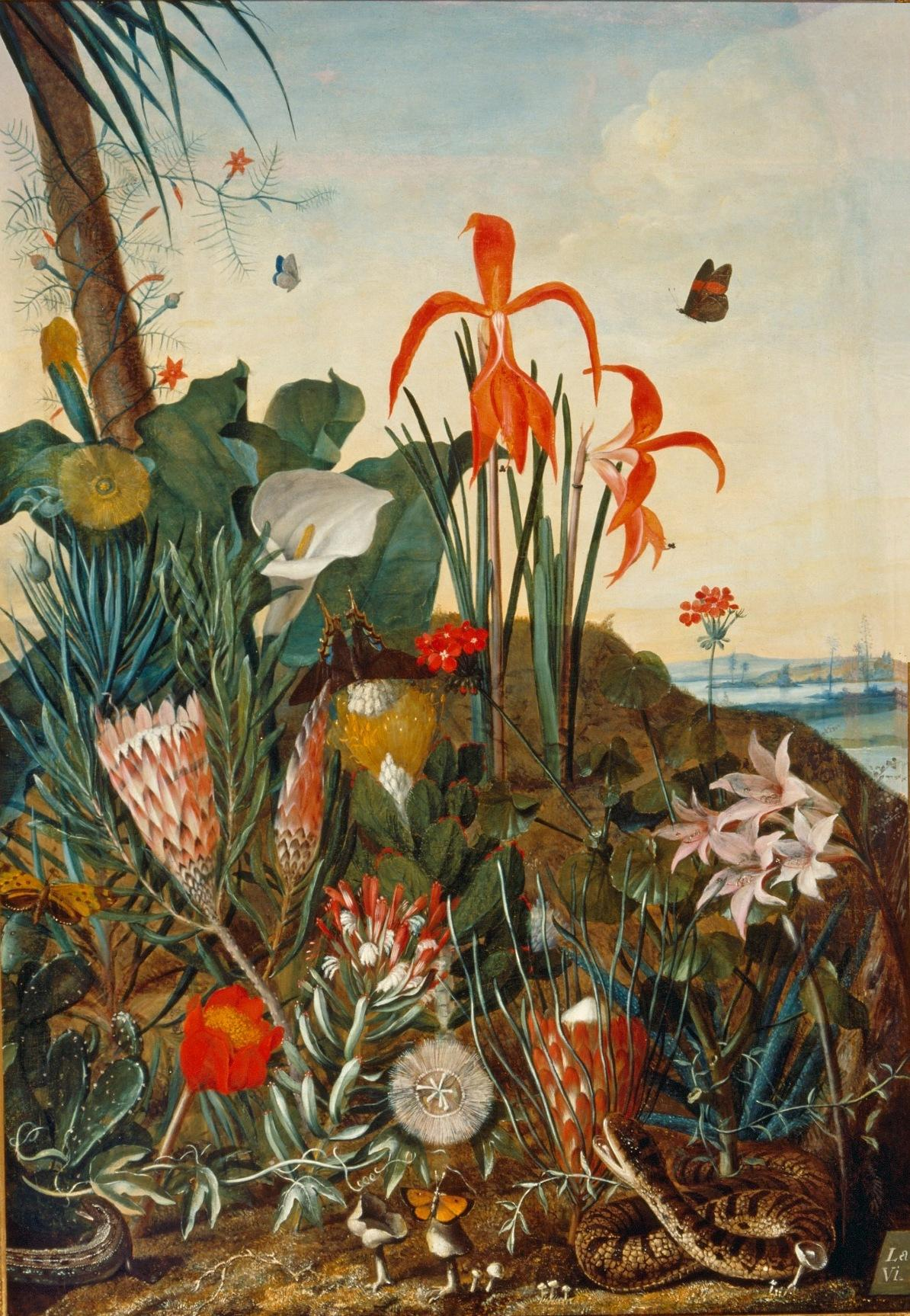
Flowers in the Hortus Botanicus Leiden, c. 1740

Laurens Jacobsz. van der Vinne (1712, Haarlem – 1742, Haarlem), was an 18th-century painter from the Dutch Republic.

== Biography ==
According to the RKD he was the son of Jacob van der Vinne and is known for interior decorations and winter landscapes. Like his grandfather and namesake Laurens van der Vinne, he also painted flowers in vases.
