= Michael Prusikin =

German chess grandmaster (born 1978)

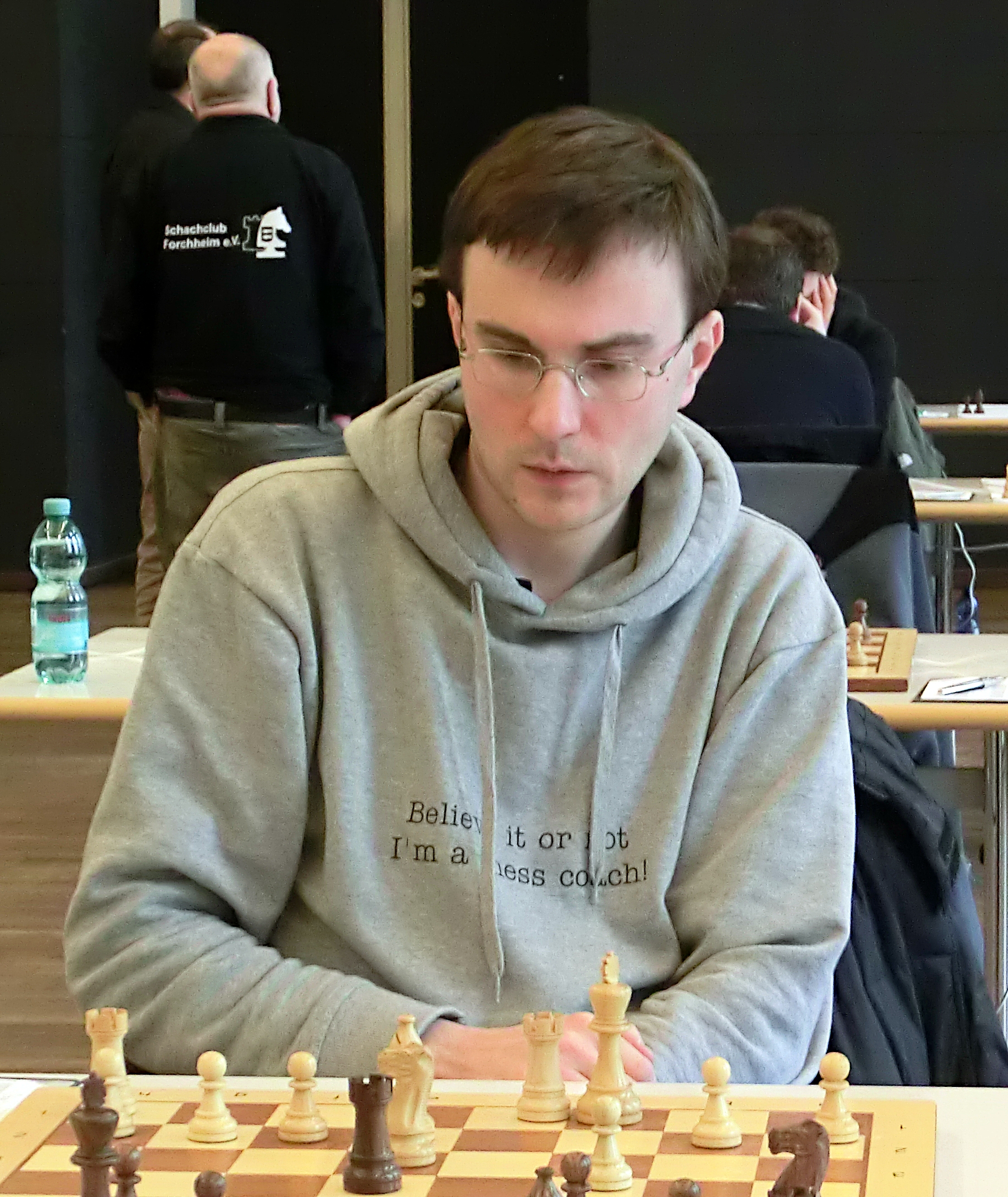
- Prusikin in 2013

Personal information
- Born: January 19, 1978 (age 48) Kharkiv, Ukrainian SSR, Soviet Union

Chess career
- Country: Germany
- Title: Grandmaster (2004)
- FIDE rating: 2485 (September 2026)
- Peak rating: 2571 (January 2007)

Michael Prusikin is a German chess grandmaster.

== Chess career ==
Born in Ukraine, Prusikin learned chess from his father and played in a chess school at an early age. His family moved to Germany in the 1990s.

He is also a chess coach, and began serving as the trainer of prodigy Leonardo Costa in 2018. He has been named as Coach of the Year by the German Chess Federation and also holds the FIDE Senior Trainer title.

In March 2004, he earned his final GM norm after scoring 5.5/8 at the Category XII tournament in Miskolc, Hungary.

In May 2021, he played on the top board for the German team in the Mitropa Cup.
