= Wesley So =

Filipino and American chess grandmaster (born 1993)

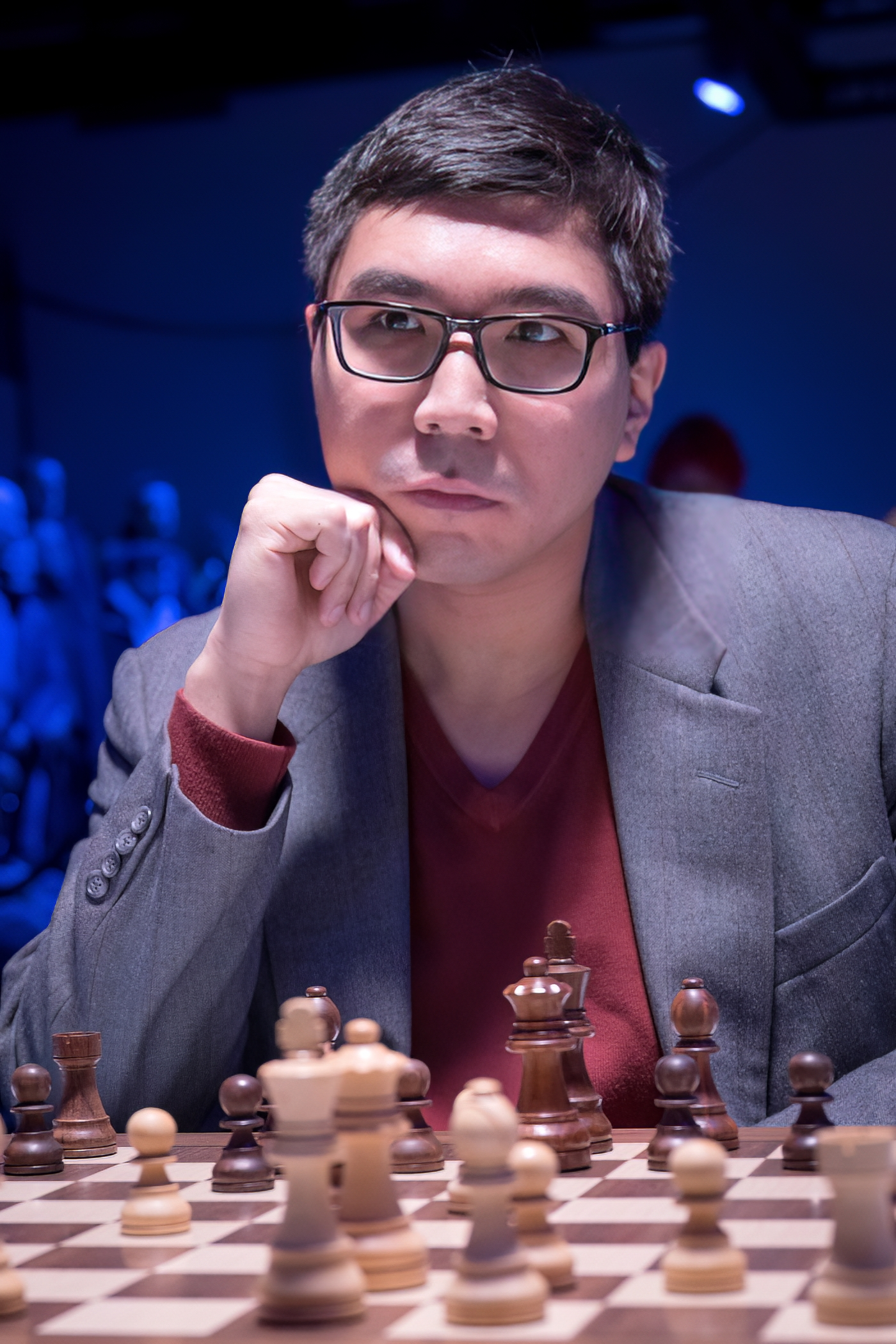
- So in 2023

Personal information
- Born: Wesley Barbossa So; October 9, 1993 (age 33) Bacoor, Philippines

Chess career
- Country: Philippines (until 2014); United States (since 2014)
- Title: Grandmaster (2008)
- FIDE rating: 2771 (November 2026)
- Peak rating: 2822 (February 2017)
- Ranking: No. 6 (November 2026)
- Peak ranking: No. 2 (March 2017)

Wesley Barbossa So (born October 9, 1993) is a Filipino and American chess grandmaster. He is a three-time Philippine Chess Champion, reigning four-time U.S. Chess Champion, and the first World Fischer Random Chess Champion. On the March 2017 FIDE rating list, he was ranked number two in the world and had an Elo rating of 2822, making him the fifth-highest-rated player in history.

In 2019, So said his favorite form of chess is chess960 (also known as Fischer random chess). Later that year, So became the inaugural World Fischer Random Chess Champion after defeating Magnus Carlsen to win the FIDE World Fischer Random Chess Championship.

A former chess prodigy, So became the youngest player to pass a 2600 Elo rating in October 2008, breaking the record previously held by Carlsen. This record has since been broken by Wei Yi, John M. Burke and Yağız Kaan Erdoğmuş. In early 2013, So passed 2700 and in January 2017 he became the 11th player to pass 2800 Elo.

So represented the Philippines until transferring to the United States in 2014. He won the 2015 Bilbao Chess Masters, the 2016 Grand Chess Tour title after claiming victory in the Sinquefield Cup and London Chess Classic, the 2017 Tata Steel Masters, the 2021 Grand Chess Tour, the 2025 Sinquefeld Cup, the 2026 American Cup, and the 2026 Sinquefeld Cup. He represented the US on board 3 at the 42nd Chess Olympiad, winning team and individual gold.

== Early life ==
So was born in the Philippines in 1993 to Filipino-Chinese William and Eleanor So. He has one older sister, Wendelle Barbossa So, and one younger sister, Wilma Barbossa So. So attended the Jesus Good Shepherd School and Saint Francis of Assisi College in Bacoor.

== Career ==
=== Representing the Philippines (2003–2014) ===
==== Early years ====
So was at the age of ten years old when he began competing in junior tournaments. So took first place at the 2003 Philippine National Chess Championships in the U-10s section. As a junior player, he also competed in various sections of World Youth Chess Championships, finishing 19th in the U-10s in 2003, 13th in the U-12s in 2004 and fourth place in the U-12s in 2005. He also took part in the ASEAN Open U-10s in 2004, securing individual golds in the standard and rapid sections along with team silver medals in the standard and rapid along with winning individual golds in the standard, rapid and blitz sections in the U-12s in 2005.

==== Rising to elite status ====
So made his tournament debut at the Nice International Open in August 2005, finishing in sixteenth place (from 159) with 4/7. He also completed three International Master norms in the space of four months, becoming the youngest Filipino to achieve that status after scoring 5/9 at the Dubai Open, 5½/9 at the San Marino Open and 6½/11 at the Dato Arthur Tan Malaysia Open. During this period, So made his first Olympiad appearance on second reserve board at the 37th Chess Olympiad held in Turin in 2006.

So's form continued with 5½/9 at the Calvia Open, his first GM-norm with 7/9 at the Bad Wiessee Open, tying for sixth with 4/8 at the GMA Presidents Cup in Parañaque and ended 2006 by scoring 6/9 at the Singapore Masters. In January 2007, So qualified for the Chess World Cup 2007 via the Zonal tournament held in Phú Quốc, Vietnam, scoring 5½/9. Between January 2006 and April 2007, So had increased his FIDE rating by 303 points to 2519.

In May 2007, he went on to become Philippine National Junior Chess Champion. So got his second GM norm by scoring 7½/13 at the 2007 World Junior Chess Championship in Yerevan. He achieved his third and final Grandmaster norm on December 8, 2007, at the Pichay Cup International Open (Manila, Philippines), thus becoming the youngest Filipino grandmaster at the age of 14 and the seventh youngest to reach the title.

January 2008 saw So finish fourth with 7/11 at the ASEAN Chess Circuit event held in Tarakan, Indonesia. In April 2008, So shared first place at the Dubai Open, scoring 7/9. He also finished in third place with 7/9 at a blitz tournament held during the rest day. So then defeated Susanto Megaranto 4–2 in a six-game match as part of the JAPFA Chess Festival held in Jakarta, won the "Battle of Grandmasters tournament" with 8½/11 (+6−0=5) in Manila, came tenth with 7½/11 in the Philippines Open followed immediately with second place at the Subic Open with 6½/9.

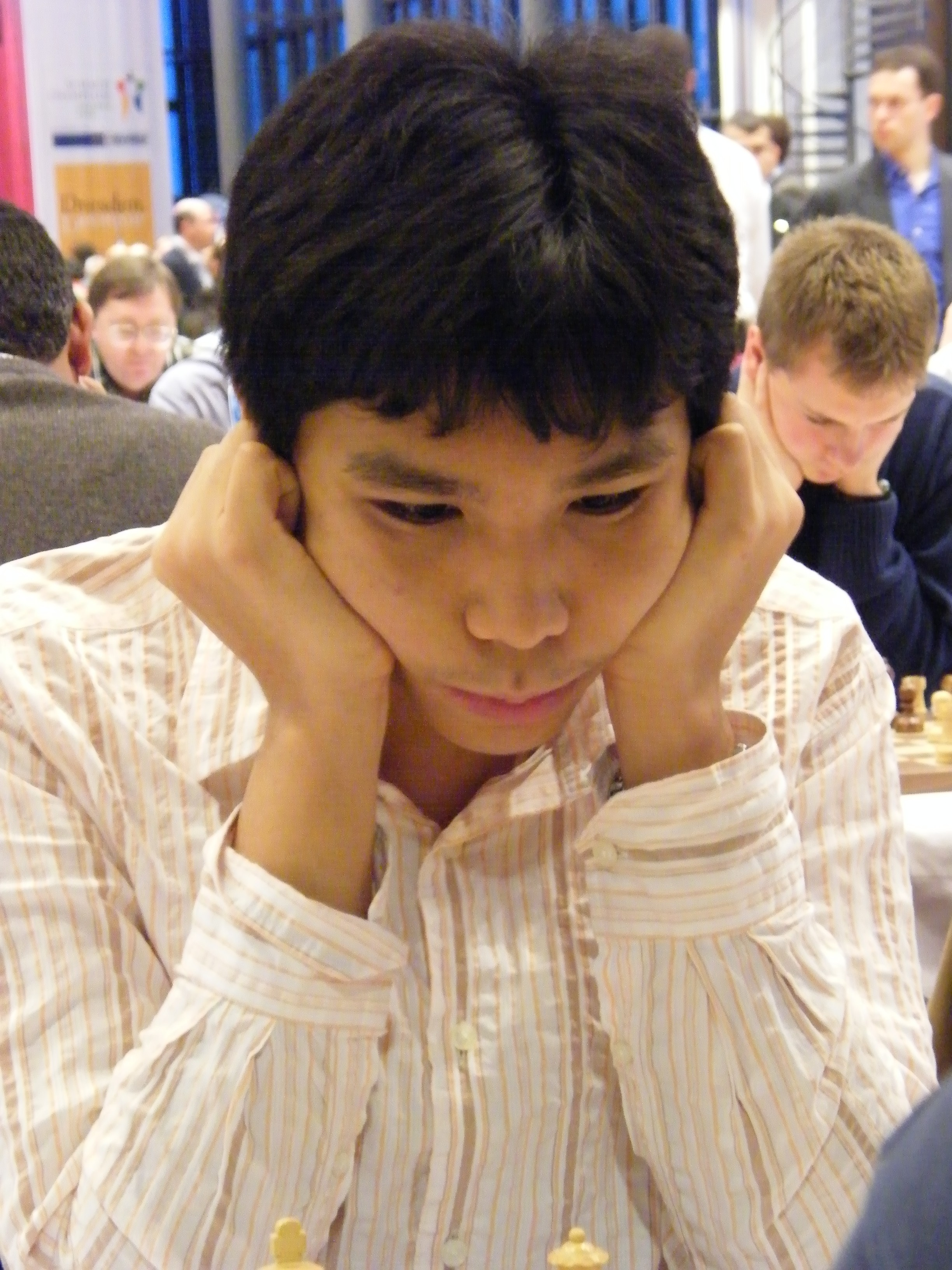
So at Dresden Olympiad 2008

In July 2008, So came second with 12½/17 in a tournament to decide the team for the 2008 38th Chess Olympiad, followed by sharing eighth place at the World Juniors Championship held in Gaziantep, Turkey. He shared second with Zurab Azmaiparashvili scoring 6½/9 at the Vietnam Open but finished well back at the Arroyo Cup in sixteenth place. During the previous 3-month rating period So completed 69 rated games.

After competing in the Asian Club Cup, So made his first appearance at a major chess tournament by winning the Corus Group C in January 2009, a point ahead of Anish Giri and Tiger Hillarp Persson with a score of 9½/13, earning a spot in Group B the next year. He scored 5/9 and shared 17th place at the strong Aeroflot Open held in Moscow. He showed his strength against home opposition scoring 9/11 at the Dapitan City Battle of GMs, but found it difficult at the Asian Continental Championships in Subic, scoring 6½/11 and sharing 18th place. So won a seat in the 2009 Chess World Cup by finishing second at the Zonal Championship held in July 2009 in Ho Chi Minh City, Vietnam. After competing in the Chinese Chess League, So shared fourth place at the SPICE Cup Group A with a solid 4½/10.

At the age of 16, So became one of the stories of the 2009 Chess World Cup held in Khanty-Mansiysk after progressing to the fourth round before being knocked out by Vladimir Malakhov after rapid tiebreaks. He defeated Gadir Guseinov after rapid tiebreaks then defeated Vassily Ivanchuk and Gata Kamsky. This was followed by sharing fourth place at the Corus Chess Group B in early 2010 with Erwin l'Ami scoring 7½/13 and sharing seventh place with 5½/9 at the Aeroflot Open. Sharing second place with 6½/9 at the Asian Continental Championships in April earned him a spot in the Chess World Cup 2011 and he secured a second Philippine Chess Championship.

As So's playing strength and rating increased, so did the number of invites to high-level events. So initially led the strong Biel tournament before drifting back to share fifth place with 4½/9. Three weeks later, So held his own in the last NH "Experience vs Rising Stars" Match (played under Scheveningen match rules) scoring 4½/10 for the "Rising Stars" team. So took part in the 39th Chess Olympiad and placed fourth, scoring 5½/10 at the 2010 SPICE Cup, before the Asian Games.

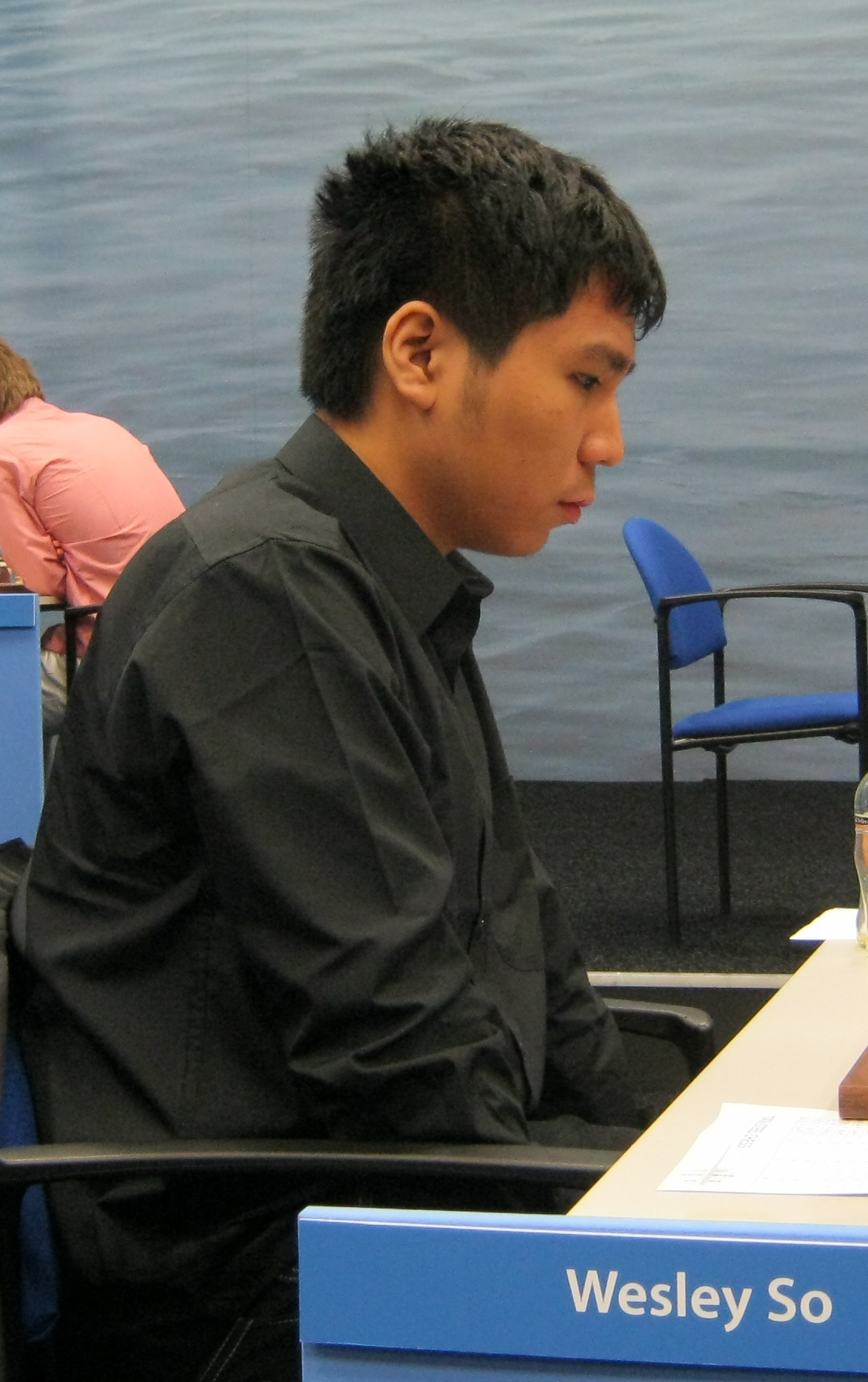
So at Tata Steel Chess 2011

So tied for fourth place at Tata Steel (formerly Corus) Group B but withdrew from the Aeroflot Open, held soon after, citing exhaustion from the previous event. In July 2011 he won the Philippine Chess Championship for a third time. So's rating hovered over the coming year with a solid performance at the strong AAI International Tournament in New Delhi among performances typical for his rating.

In 2012, So got a scholarship offer from Webster University, which was his affiliation for two-and-a-half years before becoming a full-time professional. In August 2012, So emigrated to the United States. In September 2012, So found success in first place at the Quebec International, scoring 7½/9, half a point ahead of Lazaro Bruzon and at the 40th Chess Olympiad drew against numerous top-level players including Levon Aronian, who described So as a "talented player from a country with a great chess culture".

So came second in the Zonal 3.3 Championship in Tagaytay, Philippines earning a place in the Chess World Cup 2013 and shared first place with Pavel Eljanov and Bassem Amin at the Reykjavik Open. In doing so he breached the 2700 Elo mark, considered to be the level of an elite player and placed him 50th in the World. So also won gold at the 2013 Summer Universiade in Kazan, Russia, the first such medal for the Philippines, after a play off match with Zaven Andriasian. After defeating Alexander Ipatov in the first round of the Chess World Cup, he was knocked out by eventual semi-finalist Evgeny Tomashevsky. In October 2013, So won the Unive Crown Group scoring 4½/6.

So tied for fourth with Fabiano Caruana and Leinier Domínguez Pérez at the 2014 Tata Steel Chess Tournament Group A, scoring 6/11. He also won the 49th Capablanca Memorial tournament, held in Havana, a point clear of Lazaro Bruzon, soon after winning the ACP Golden Classic tournament in Bergamo, Italy with a score of 4½/6, a point ahead of Baadur Jobava. This string of tournaments propelled So to 12th in the FIDE World Rankings.

=== Transfer to the United States (2013–2014) ===
So expressed intent to represent the United States, filing the documents required for him to be able to change his FIDE nationality in 2013. He justified the move due to his family permanently settling in Canada, himself planning to study and permanently reside in the United States, and as part of a bid to boost his own career. He also said that National Chess Federation of the Philippines (NCFP) disapproved of his participation in the 2013 Summer Universiade in Kazan, Russia over the 2013 Asian Indoor Games and he felt obliged to participate in tournaments deemed important by the NCFP such as the Southeast Asian Games over concern that he might lose financial support even if it conflicted with his studies in the United States. Retrospectively in 2019 and in 2021, he said that he lacked the necessary "connections" for him to be able to thrive in the Philippines.

According to Eugene Torre, aside from his family the move was likely caused by So not receiving recognition for his gold medal feat at the 2013 Universiade since his participation under the Federation of School Sports Association of the Philippines (FESSAP) led by Graham Lim was not sanctioned by the Philippine Olympic Committee.

=== Representing the United States (2014–present) ===
So's transfer to the United States Chess Federation was confirmed in the November 2014 rating list. Soon after, he moved to Minnetonka, Minnesota to live with his adoptive parents, Lotis Key and her husband, Renato Kabigting.

He won the Millionaire Chess Tournament held in Las Vegas in October 2014, scoring 8½/13 and shared second place at the Tata Steel Masters in January 2015. In June 2015, in the Dortmund Sparkassen Chess Tournament, he came in second, behind the winner Fabiano Caruana. In November 2015, So won the 2015 Bilbao Chess Masters Final tournament. He defeated Grandmaster Ding Liren in Round 1, drew the remaining 5 games, and won in the tiebreaks against Grandmaster Anish Giri.

So was awarded the Samford Fellowship in March 2016, enabling him to secure Vladimir Tukmakov as his coach. In August 2016, So finished clear first at the 2016 Sinquefield Cup, ahead of former World Champions Viswanathan Anand and Veselin Topalov, 2014 winner Fabiano Caruana, and 2015 winner Levon Aronian. He won two games and drew seven games. In December 2016, So also finished clear first at the 2016 London Chess Classic, ahead of former World Champions Anand, Vladimir Kramnik, and Topalov. He won three games and drew six games (+3−0=6). In winning the Sinquefield Cup, the London Chess Classic, and finishing second at the Your Next Move Leuven rapid and blitz tournament, he won the 2016 Grand Chess Tour. So's first appearance for the United States yielded individual gold medal for board 3 as well as team gold at the Chess Olympiad held in Baku.

In January 2017, So won the Tata Steel Masters, finishing ahead of World Champion Magnus Carlsen by a full point, with a score of 9/13, to rise to World No. 3 in the next FIDE list.

Wesley So played for the Saint Louis Arch Bishops in the Professional Rapid Online Chess League competition, winning all four of his games two weeks in a row. In week six, he and his team beat the division leader San Diego Surfers, which at the time had the only perfect record in the league.

So won the 2017 U.S. Chess Championship by defeating Alexander Onischuk in a rapid playoff tiebreak. He won three games and drew eight (+3−0=8) in the classical portion of the tournament. He had an undefeated streak of 67 games starting in July 2016, which ended in April 2017 after losing to the Azerbaijani GM Shakhriyar Mamedyarov who won the Shamkir Chess tournament. In June 2017, So scored 4½/9 at Norway Chess. He rebounded from seventh place at the Your Next Move Paris event with victory in the rapid portion of Your Next Move GCT (Leuven) with +5−0=4. He finished the tournament in second place with a score of 22½/36, 3 points behind winner Magnus Carlsen.

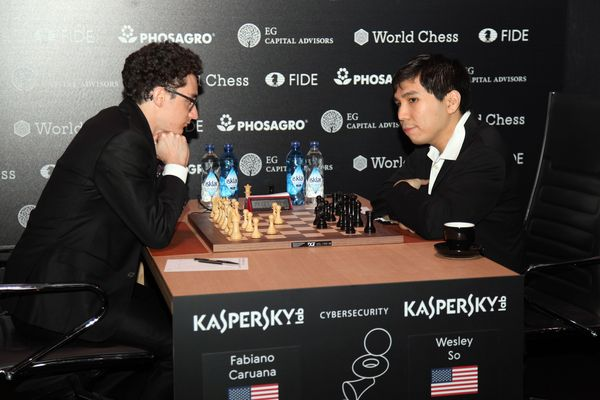
So at the 2018 Candidates Tournament.

In August 2017, So scored 3/9 at the Sinquefield Cup for tied last place. In September, So progressed to the semi-finals of the World Cup and was knocked out by Ding Liren on tiebreaks. Wesley So qualified for the 2018 Candidates Tournament as ratings qualifier in November 2017. He had a poor showing at the Candidates, placing seventh with 6/14.

From May 28 to June 7, 2018, he competed in the sixth edition of Norway Chess, placing fifth with 4/8 (+1–1=6). He recorded his first victory over Carlsen in a classical game in this event.

==== Inaugural Fischer Random World Champion ====
On November 2, 2019, So was crowned the very first Fischer Random World Champion, defeating the four-time reigning classical world chess champion Magnus Carlsen with a score of 13.5 – 2.5 points, posting four wins, two draws and no losses. So had also won the semifinal match against Ian Nepomniachtchi by reaching a score of 13–5 in the third fast rapid game, posting three wins, four draws and again no losses. Leonard Barden observed that the score unadjusted for time controls would be 5–1 and compared this "crushing" defeat to Bobby Fischer's double 6–0 victories in the 1971 Candidates. Barden also reported that Carlsen was "deeply ashamed".

==== 2020–present ====
On September 19, 2020, So tied for 1st place in the 2020 St. Louis Rapid and Blitz, scoring 24/36 points. He won his last 3 games to eventually catch up and tie with Carlsen for winnings of US$45,000.00. On September 30, 2020, So ended up runner-up to Carlsen in the 2020 Chess24 Banter Series Finals, losing 3.5–5.5, and settling for a prize fund of US$6.000.00. On October 1, 2020, the Saint Louis Arch Bishops were declared the winners of the 2020 Professional Rapid Online Chess League after the Armenia Eagles were disqualified due to fair play violations. This was the Arch Bishops 3rd title overall and 2nd consecutive championship. Wesley So was named MVP of the season with an impressive score of 24.5/32 for a performance rating of 2826.

On October 1, 2020, So accused Tigran L. Petrosian of cheating in his semi-final and final games during the Chess.com 2020 PRO Chess League (So was rated eighth-highest player in the world at the time). Petrosian responded to So with a lengthy message including the comments, "You are a biggest looser i ever seen in my life ! You was doing PIPI in your pampers when i was beating players much more stronger then you! [sic]". Chess.com determined that Petrosian had violated fair play regulations; consequently, his team, the Armenia Eagles, were disqualified and the Saint Louis Arch Bishops were crowned champions. Chess.com and the PRO Chess League both issued lifetime bans to Petrosian.

On October 29, 2020, So became US Champion again. He amassed a score of 9/11 against a top class field in the online competition. So's unbeaten performance was compared by some chess commentators to the dominant performances of Bobby Fischer in the 1960s, particularly Fischer's 11/11 performance in 1963/1964 and his 9.5/11 performance in 1966. So's 9/11 score is the third-best score in the US National Championships history.

On November 30, 2020, So defeated Carlsen to win the Skilling Open championship, the first leg of the Champions Chess Tour. Day 1 of the match ended with a score of 2–2, with both players having won two games each. On Day 2, Magnus won the first game with the black pieces and Wesley drew level the following game with black pieces. Game 3 was a close encounter which ended in a draw and Game 4 was a quick played draw in the Berlin Defence. The decider match consisted of two blitz games (5+3). Wesley So won the first game and was able to draw the second, earning the first prize along with US$30,000.

On February 14, 2021, So defeated Magnus Carlsen to win the Opera Euro Rapid. The first day of the finals ended in 2–2. The second day, So secured victory in the first match after 28 moves which propelled him to win the day, and the tournament, with a score of 2.5–1.5. This was his second victory in the Meltwater Champions Chess Tour during the 2020–2021 season with the COVID-19 era online format.

On August 27, 2021, So won the 2021 Grand Chess Tour, as a runner up of the Superbet Chess Classic, and then as the winner of the Paris Rapid & Blitz and finally as a runner-up of the Sinquefield Cup.

On October 19, 2021, So won the US Championship again after defeating Fabiano Caruana and Samuel Sevian in the rapid tiebreaks.

Through February and March 2022, So played in the FIDE Grand Prix 2022. In the first leg, he tied for first with Leinier Domínguez in Pool D with a 4/6 result but lost with a 0.5/2 result in rapid tiebreakers. In the third leg, he tied for first with Sam Shankland in Pool C with a result of 3.5/6 and defeated him with a 1.5/2 result in rapid tiebreakers to face Amin Tabatabaei in the semifinals. So then drew his classical match against Tabatabaei with one win and one loss but defeated him in rapid tiebreakers to face Hikaru Nakamura in the finals. Their classical encounter ended with two draws, after which So beat Nakamura in the rapid tiebreakers with a 1.5/2 result, winning the third leg of the Fide Grand Prix and finishing third in the overall Fide Grand Prix 2022 series.

In April 2022 he participated in the American Cup.

In May 2022 he tied for first in the Superbet Chess Classic, losing to Maxime Vachier-Lagrave in the tiebreaks.

In November 2022 he won the first-ever Chess.com Global Championship for $200,000, defeating Hikaru Nakamura in the semi-finals and Nihal Sarin in the finals with a match score of 4.5–1.5.

In August 2025, he played Fabiano Caruana and R Praggnanandhaa in tiebreaks to win the 2025 Sinquefield Cup, after a request from the players to share the title was rejected by the arbiter.

In January 2026, he won the 2026 Tata Steel Chess India Blitz in the open category.

In March 2026, he won his first American Cup title by beating Levon Aronian in the finals.

In August 2026, he won his second consecutive Sinquefield Cup title and third overall after beating R Praggnanandhaa in the tiebreaks.

In October 2026, So won the US Championship for the fourth time, winning a rapid tiebreak against Fabiano Caruana.

== Team results ==
So has competed in nine Chess Olympiads, making his debut at 12 years old representing the Philippines at the Turin Olympiad in 2006. Since the 2016 Olympiad, So has represented the United States.

Event	Board	Individual result	Team result
Olympiad, Turin 2006	Second Reserve	3/5	44th
World Youth U16 Olympiad, Singapore 2007	First	9½/10 (Gold)	Bronze
World Youth U16 Olympiad, Mersin 2008	First	9/10 (Gold)	Bronze
Olympiad, Dresden 2008	Second	7/10 (11th)	46th
Olympiad, Khanty-Mansiysk 2010	First	6½/10 (27th)	50th
Asian Games, Guangzhou 2010	First	5/8	Silver
Olympiad, Istanbul 2012	First	6½/11 (16th)	21st
Olympiad, Baku 2016	Third	8½/10 (Gold)	Gold
Olympiad, Batumi 2018	Second	7½/11 (6th)	Silver
Olympiad, Chennai 2022	Third	7/10 (5th)	5th
Olympiad, Budapest 2024	Second	6½/10 (6th)	Silver
Olympiad, Samarkand 2026	Second	6/9 (4th)	4th

== Playing style ==
As a young player, So's aggressive and tactical style of play caught the attention of a former Philippine chess champion, International Master Rodolfo Tan Cardoso. Cardoso said of So:

The young lad...would sacrifice a queen or any other pieces in his arsenal to get a winning attack....He cannot afford decent training given by well known GM-coaches and has to rely on his pure talent...before competing.

So commented during an interview with Alina l'Ami in 2009:

So far I play aggressively. I would like to play a solid game with a solid opening. This is what I want. I think my style is close to Vishy Anand. Of course we have different level.

His playing style has evolved in recent years to become more precise and risk-free, relying on taking advantage of opponent's mistakes. Nowadays, So considers it useless to play aggressively at the top level.

So has said that his favourite game was his win against Ni Hua in the 2008 Chess Olympiad, which was his first win against a 2700-rated opponent.

So vs. Prusikin, 2006

Position: a8 black rook, b8 black knight, f8 black rook, g8 black king, d7 black knight, b6 black pawn, e6 black pawn, f6 black queen, g6 black pawn, a5 black pawn, d5 black pawn, g5 white knight, h5 black pawn, d4 black pawn, f4 white pawn, c3 white pawn, d3 white queen, e3 white knight, a2 white pawn, b2 white pawn, g2 white pawn, h2 white pawn, e1 white rook, f1 white rook, g1 white king

Position after 18...cxd4. White launched a combination with 19.Nxe6

During So's tournament victory at Bad Wiessee in 2006, he earned a creativity award in the Russian magazine e3e5 for the following game:

So vs. Michael Prusikin
1.e4 e6 2.d4 d5 3.Nc3 Nf6 4.Bg5 Be7 5.e5 Nfd7 6.Bxe7 Qxe7 7.f4 a6 8.Nf3 b6 9.Qd2 c5 10.Nd1 0-0 11.c3 f6 12.Bd3 a5 13.0–0 Ba6 14.exf6 Qxf6 15.Ng5 g6 16.Ne3 h5 17.Rae1 Bxd3 18.Qxd3 cxd4 (diagram) 19.Nxe6 Qxe6 20.Nxd5 Qf7 21.Re7 Qf5 22.Qxd4 Nf6 23.Re5 Qd7 24.Qd3 Nxd5 25.Qxg6+ Qg7 26.Qe6+ Qf7 27.Qh6 Qf6 28.Rg5+ Kf7 29.Qh7+ Ke8 30.Rxd5 1–0

== Personal life ==
So has been estranged from his biological family after they left for Canada and left him alone in Metro Manila. In the United States, So lives in Excelsior, Minnesota, with Lotis Key, her husband Bambi Kabigting, and their daughter, whom he considers his adoptive family. So became a citizen of the United States in February 2021.

He is an Evangelical Christian. In an article for Christianity Today in August 2017, he stated that he reads the Bible every night and attends church every weekend.

In 2025, Chess.com created a documentary about his life, from birth to present day which included interviews with Lotis Key.

Awards and achievements
Preceded by Fabiano Caruana	US Chess Champion; 2017	Succeeded by Sam Shankland
Preceded by Hikaru Nakamura	US Chess Champion; 2020	Succeeded by Incumbent
Preceded by Incumbent	US Chess Champion; 2021	Succeeded by Fabiano Caruana
Preceded by None	Chess 960 Champion; 2019	Succeeded by Hikaru Nakamura
