= Van Foreest =

German aristocratic family

van Foreest
- noble family
- Country: Netherlands
- Founded: 13th century
- Founder: Richolfus de Foresto

Van Foreest is the name of an aristocratic family that most probably originates from the region of Aachen, Germany, but is already found in the County of Holland in the 13th century. The family was already noble from earliest times ("Uradel"). In the early modern period, the family played a role in the city councils of Haarlem, Delft and Alkmaar. Members of the family are jonkheer.

== Coat of arms ==
The Van Foreest coat of arms is depicted in the medieval Gelre Armorial (folio 85v).

== Notable members ==
- Arnold van Foreest (1863–1954), chess player
- Dirk van Foreest (1862–1956), chess player
- Jorden van Foreest (born 1999), chess player
- Lucas van Foreest (born 2001), chess player
- Machteld van Foreest (born 2007), chess player
- Pieter van Foreest (1521–1597), physician

== Gallery ==
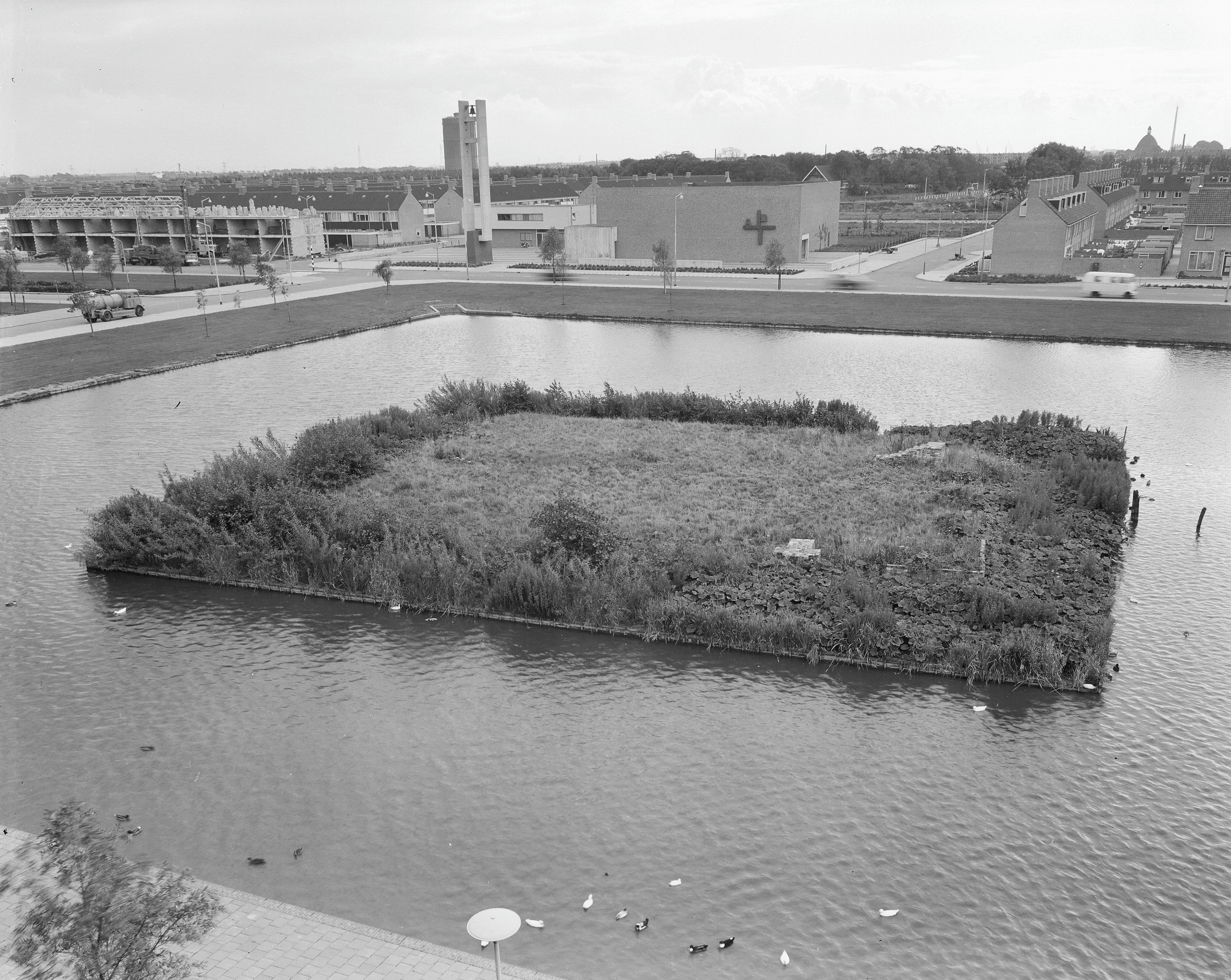
Castle Ter Wijc in Beverwijk

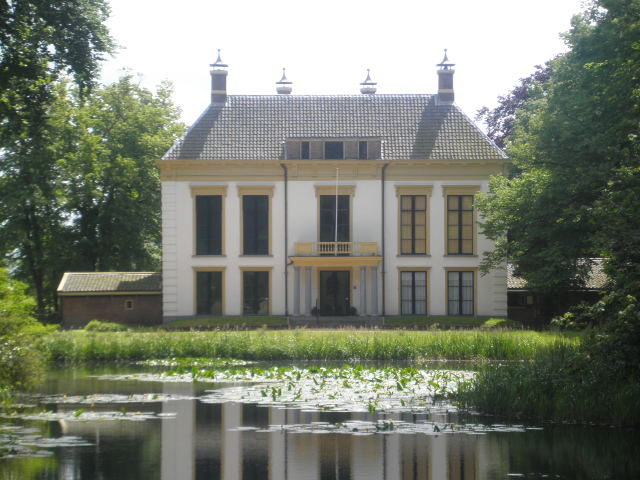
Nijenburg estate in Heiloo
