= Bogdan-Daniel Deac =

Romanian chess grandmaster (born 2001)

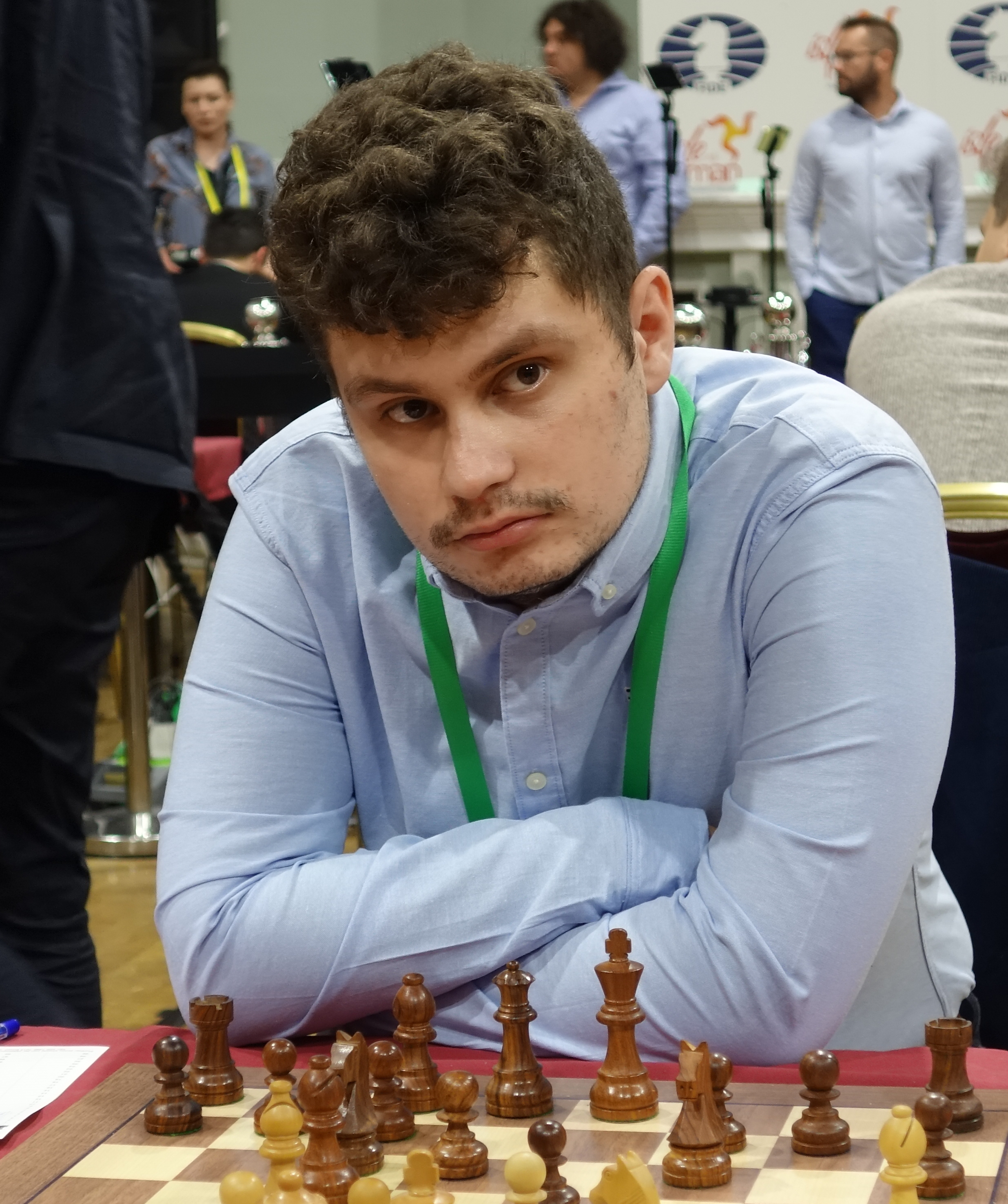
- Bogdan-Daniel Deac in 2023

Personal information
- Born: 8 October 2001 (age 24) Râmnicu Vâlcea, Romania

Chess career
- Country: Romania
- Title: Grandmaster (2016)
- FIDE rating: 2651 (July 2026)
- Peak rating: 2710 (September 2022)
- Ranking: No. 68 (July 2026)
- Peak ranking: No. 34 (September 2022)

Bogdan-Daniel Deac (born 8 October 2001) is a Romanian chess grandmaster. A chess prodigy, he earned his grandmaster title at the age of 14 years, 7 months and 27 days. Deac crossed the 2700 barrier for the first time in September 2022, when he reached his peak FIDE rating of 2710, placing him at World No. 34.

== Chess career ==
Born in 2001, Deac earned his international master title in 2014 and his grandmaster title in 2016. He is the No. 1 ranked Romanian player as of September 2024. In March 2018, he competed in the European Individual Chess Championship. He placed ninety-fourth, scoring 6/11 (+4–3=4).

He played in the Chess World Cup 2021, losing in the second round to Grigoriy Oparin after a walkover in the first, and in the Chess World Cup 2023, where he defeated Pablo Ismael Acosta in the second round before being eliminated by Nihal Sarin in the third round.

In 2024, he won the Reykjavik Open as clear first with a score of 7.5/9.
