= Jorden van Foreest =

Dutch chess grandmaster (born 1999)

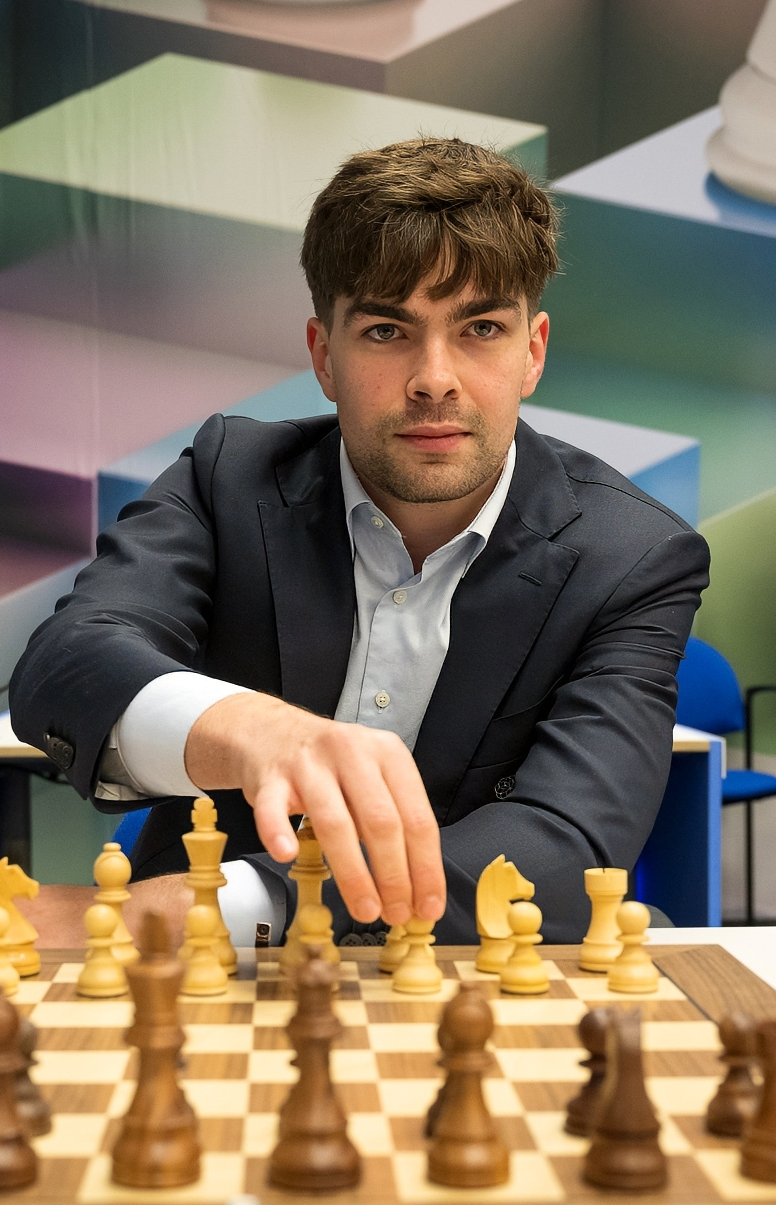
- Van Foreest in 2025

Personal information
- Born: 30 April 1999 (age 27) Utrecht, Netherlands
- Relatives: Lucas van Foreest (brother); Machteld van Foreest (sister)
- Family: Van Foreest

Chess career
- Country: Netherlands
- Title: Grandmaster (2016)
- FIDE rating: 2716 (October 2026)
- Peak rating: 2736 (April 2026)
- Ranking: No. 24 (October 2026)
- Peak ranking: No. 14 (April 2026)

Jhr. Jorden van Foreest (born 30 April 1999) is a Dutch chess grandmaster. He won the Dutch Chess Championship in 2016 and 2025, and also the Tata Steel Masters in 2021. As of September 2026, Van Foreest is the No. 2 ranked Dutch player behind Anish Giri.

== Chess career ==
Introduced to the game by his father, Van Foreest learned to play chess at the age of six but did not play regularly until he was nine. He graduated from the Topsport Talent School in 2018 and since then he has been a professional chess player.

=== 2013–2016 ===
In 2013, Van Foreest won the European U14 Chess Championship with a score of 7.5/9 (+6–0=3). He earned his international master title in 2014 at the age of 15 and secured all the norms needed for the grandmaster title in 2015 at the age of 16. He was officially awarded his grandmaster title by FIDE in 2016. This makes him the Netherlands' youngest ever grandmaster (Anish Giri was awarded the title at a younger age but was not a Dutch player at the time).

In September 2015, he competed in the World Junior Chess Championship. He finished sixth, scoring 8/13 (+5–2=6). In December, Van Foreest won the Groningen Chess Festival with a score of 7.5/9 (+7–1=1).

Van Foreest won the Dutch Chess Championship in August 2016. He scored 5.5/7 (+5–1=1) for a performance rating of 2819.

=== 2017–2020 ===
As of 2017, Van Foreest is coached by three-time Dutch Chess Champion Sergei Tiviakov. From 26 June to 2 July 2017, he competed in the Dutch Chess Championship. He finished seventh, scoring 3/7 (+2–3=2). From 28 October to 6 November, he competed for the Netherlands on board 4 at the 2017 European Team Chess Championship. He scored 5/7 (+4–1=2) for a performance rating of 2723. From 13 to 25 November, he competed at the World Junior Chess Championship. He placed fifth with a score of 8/11 (+7–2=2), half a point behind the winner Aryan Tari.

From 13 to 28 January 2018, Van Foreest competed in the Tata Steel Challengers. He finished fifth, scoring 7.5/13 (+4–2=7). He competed in the 81st Tata Steel Masters in January 2019, placing thirteenth with 4.5/13 (+3–7=3). In July, Van Foreest shared first in the 2019 Dutch Championship with 5/7 (+3–0=4), losing on tiebreak to his younger brother Lucas van Foreest.

At the 82nd Tata Steel Masters in January 2020, Van Foreest placed fourth with 7/13 (+3–2=8).

=== 2021 ===
Van Foreest competed in the 83rd Tata Steel Masters in January, and after 13 rounds was tied for first with Anish Giri on a score of 8.5/13 (+4–0=9). After drawing both blitz tiebreakers, Van Foreest won the armageddon game, thus winning the tournament. In the process, Van Foreest increased his Elo rating to 2700+ for the first time in his career, and became the first Dutchman since Jan Timman in 1985 to win Wijk aan Zee. He acted as a second for Magnus Carlsen in the World Chess Championship 2021 against Ian Nepomniachtchi.

=== 2026 ===
Starting in January and ending in February, Van Foreest participated in the Tata Steel Chess 2026 Tournament. After a strong tournament, Van Foreest ended in a three-way tie for third place. After coming out in top using Sonneborn-Berger tiebreaks, he placed third overall, with a score of 7.5/13. In May, Van Foreest defeated Magnus Carlsen in the fourth round of the TePe Sigeman & Co Chess Tournament 2026 with the white pieces in a dramatic game.

== Personal life ==
Van Foreest was born in Utrecht on 30 April 1999 and raised in Groningen, and is a member of the Dutch noble family "Van Foreest" with the honorific of jonkheer. He is the great-great-grandson of Arnold van Foreest and great-great-grandnephew of Dirk van Foreest. Dirk was the 86-year-old opponent of Jacques Mieses in a much-cited 1949 exhibition game with a combined age of 170 years. Both Arnold and Dirk were three-time Dutch Chess Champions (Arnold: 1889, 1893, 1902; Dirk: 1885, 1886, 1887).

Van Foreest is the eldest child of his family and has five siblings: four brothers and one sister. He was born to father Nicky van Foreest who is a professor and faculty of the department of Economics at the University of Groningen and to mother Sheila Timp who is a medical doctor and a programmer. He was homeschooled in his early childhood along with the rest of his siblings. Van Foreest used to play at his local chess clubs after taking an interest in the game at age 9. His younger brother, Lucas (born 2001), earned the title of grandmaster in 2018. His sister, Machteld (born 2007), won the Dutch Girls' U10 Championship at the age of 6 and shared second place in the Dutch Girls' U20 Championship when she was 9. In 2017, she became the first girl ever to win the Dutch U12 Championship. She became the Dutch Women's Champion in 2022 & 2025. She has a FIDE rating of 2285 as of July 2025.
