= Ukraine national chess team =

International chess team

The Ukraine national chess team represents Ukraine in international chess team competitions and is governed by the Ukrainian Chess Federation.

Competing as an independent nation since 1992, Ukraine has established itself as one of the world's leading chess teams, winning two Chess Olympiad gold medals (2004 and 2010), one World Team Chess Championship (2001), and two European Team Chess Championships (2021 and 2025).

== Overview ==
Ukraine made its international debut at the 30th Chess Olympiad in Manila in 1992, finishing ninth with a lineup led by Vassily Ivanchuk, Alexander Beliavsky, Oleg Romanishin, and Vyacheslav Eingorn. Later that same year, the team won its first medal—silver—at the European Team Chess Championship in Debrecen. In 1993, Ukraine secured silver at the World Team Chess Championship in Lucerne, where Ivanchuk and Volodymyr Malaniuk won individual gold medals on boards one and two.

At the 32nd Chess Olympiad in Yerevan (1996), Ukraine went undefeated to claim its first Olympiad medal (silver). This was followed by consecutive Olympiad bronze medals at Elista 1998—marked by the national team debut of 15-year-old future World Champion Ruslan Ponomariov, who won individual silver as second reserve—and Istanbul 2000, where Ponomariov won gold on board two. In 2001, Ukraine captured its first international gold medal at the World Team Chess Championship in Yerevan, finishing undefeated ahead of Russia with a squad comprising Ivanchuk, Ponomariov, Volodymyr Baklan, Eingorn, Romanishin, and Vadim Malakhatko.

Ukraine won its first Chess Olympiad title at the 36th Chess Olympiad in Calvià (2004), going undefeated (10 wins, 4 draws) to finish three points ahead of Russia. The championship team consisted of Ivanchuk, Ponomariov, Andrei Volokitin, Alexander Moiseenko, Pavel Eljanov, and debutant Sergey Karjakin, who scored 6½/7 to win individual gold on the second reserve board.

After narrowly missing the podium on tiebreaks in fourth place at the 38th Chess Olympiad in Dresden (2008), Ukraine won bronze at the European Team Chess Championship in Novi Sad (2009) despite competing without Ivanchuk, Ponomariov, and Karjakin (who transferred to the Russian federation that year), with Eljanov winning individual gold on board one. In 2010, Ukraine reclaimed the Chess Olympiad gold medal at the 39th Chess Olympiad in Khanty-Mansiysk, going undefeated (8 wins, 3 draws) ahead of host Russia. The winning lineup featured Ivanchuk (who won individual gold on board one with a 2890 performance rating), Ponomariov, Eljanov (individual silver), Zahar Efimenko (individual silver), and Moiseenko. Between 2011 and 2015, Ukraine added bronze medals at the World Team Chess Championship in Ningbo (2011), the 40th Chess Olympiad in Istanbul (2012), and the World Team Chess Championship in Antalya (2013), as well as a silver medal at the World Team Chess Championship in Tsaghkadzor (2015).

At the 42nd Chess Olympiad in Baku (2016), Ukraine tied on match points (20) with the United States, taking the silver medal on tiebreaks while reserve board player Volokitin scored 8½/9 for a tournament-best 2992 performance rating and individual gold. Following bronze and silver medals at the European Team Chess Championships in Crete (2017) and Batumi (2019), seventh-seeded Ukraine went undefeated in both matches and individual games to win its first European Team Championship title in Čatež ob Savi, Slovenia (2021), edging out France on tiebreaks with a squad of Anton Korobov, Volokitin (individual board two gold), Yuriy Kuzubov, Kirill Shevchenko, and Volodymyr Onyshchuk. Ukraine claimed a second European gold medal in Batumi in 2025 with a lineup of Ponomariov, Volokitin, Korobov, Igor Kovalenko (board four gold), and Ihor Samunenkov (reserve board gold), before finishing 11th at the 46th Chess Olympiad in Samarkand (2026), where Samunenkov won individual gold on board four.

== Competitive record ==
=== Chess Olympiad ===
Year	Host city	Result
1992	(Philippines) Manila	9th
1994	(Russia) Moscow	9th
1996	(Armenia) Yerevan	Silver
1998	(Russia) Elista	Bronze
2000	(Turkey) Istanbul	Bronze
2002	(Slovenia) Bled	14th
2004	(Spain) Calvià	Champions
2006	(Italy) Turin	8th
2008	(Germany) Dresden	4th
2010	(Russia) Khanty-Mansiysk	Champions
2012	(Turkey) Istanbul	Bronze
2014	(Norway) Tromsø	6th
2016	(Azerbaijan) Baku	Silver
2018	(Georgia (country)) Batumi	10th
2022	(India) Chennai	29th
2024	(Hungary) Budapest	16th
2026	(Uzbekistan) Samarkand	11th

=== World Team Chess Championship ===
Year	Host city	Result
1993	(Switzerland) Lucerne	Silver
1997	(Switzerland) Lucerne	5th
2001	(Armenia) Yerevan	Champions
2005	(Israel) Beersheba	4th
2010	(Turkey) Bursa	Did not qualify
2011	(China) Ningbo	Bronze
2013	(Turkey) Antalya	Bronze
2015	(Armenia) Tsaghkadzor	Silver
2017	(Russia) Khanty-Mansiysk	6th
2019	(Kazakhstan) Astana	Did not qualify
2022	(Israel) Jerusalem	Quarter-finals (Rapid)

=== European Team Chess Championship ===
Year	Host city / country	Result
1992	(Hungary) Debrecen	Silver
1997	(Croatia) Pula	Did not participate
1999	(Georgia (country)) Batumi	6th
2001	(Spain) León	11th
2003	(Bulgaria) Plovdiv	5th
2005	(Sweden) Gothenburg	5th
2007	(Greece) Heraklion	5th
2009	(Serbia) Novi Sad	Bronze
2011	(Greece) Porto Carras	15th
2013	(Poland) Warsaw	9th
2015	(Iceland) Reykjavík	5th
2017	(Greece) Crete	Bronze
2019	(Georgia (country)) Batumi	Silver
2021	Slovenia	Champions
2023	(Montenegro) Budva	Did not participate
2025	(Georgia (country)) Batumi	Champions

== See also ==
- Ukrainian Chess Championship
