= FIDE Grand Swiss Tournament 2021 =

Chess tournament in Riga, Latvia

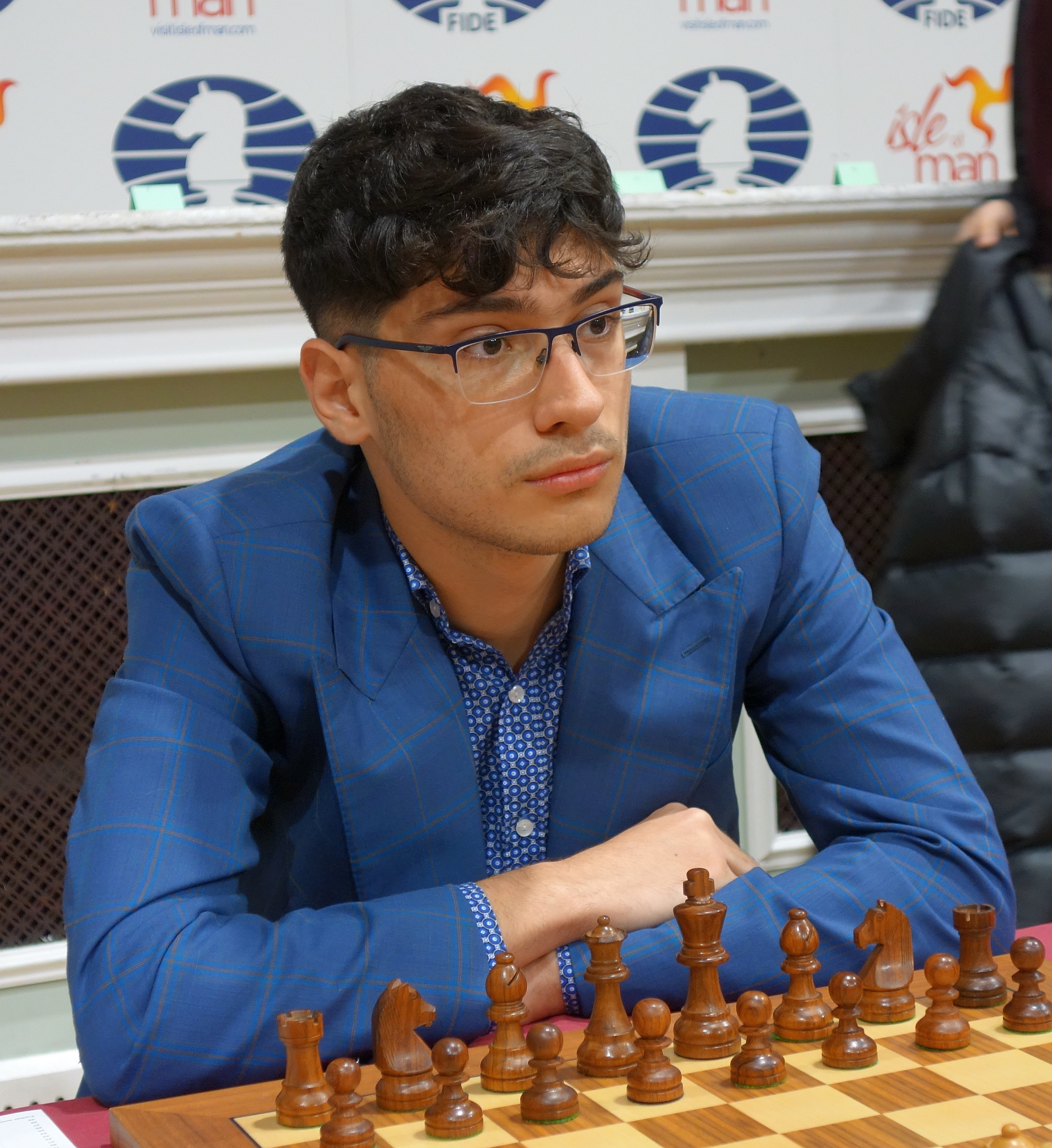
- 2021 Grand Swiss Tournament winner Alireza Firouzja

Tournament information
- Sport: Chess
- Location: Riga, Latvia
- Dates: 25 October 2021– 8 November 2021
- Administrators: FIDE; Chess.com
- Tournament format: Swiss-system tournament
- Host(s): IOM International Chess Limited, sponsored by Scheinberg family

Final positions
- Champion: (France) Alireza Firouzja
- Runner-up: (United States) Fabiano Caruana

The FIDE Grand Swiss Tournament 2021 was a chess tournament that formed part of the qualification cycle for the World Chess Championship 2022. It was an 11-round Swiss-system tournament, with 108 players competing, running from 25 October to 8 November 2021 in Riga, Latvia, in parallel with the FIDE Women's Grand Swiss Tournament 2021. The tournaments were held while Latvia was in a COVID-19 lockdown, which led to a number of players withdrawing before the tournament began. The event was co-organized by Chess.com and financed by the family of Igal Mark Scheinberg, an Israeli businessman and resident of the Isle of Man.

The tournament was won by Alireza Firouzja. The top two finishers, Firouzja and Fabiano Caruana, qualified for the Candidates Tournament 2022. (Note: The exact rule was that it would be the top two finishers, other than the competitors in the World Chess Championship 2021 match and those who had already qualified for the Candidates. However, none of the world championship players (Magnus Carlsen and Ian Nepomniachtchi) or already-qualified candidates (Teimour Radjabov, Sergey Karjakin and Jan-Krzysztof Duda) played in the Grand Swiss.) The rest of the top eight, Grigoriy Oparin, Yu Yangyi, Vincent Keymer, Maxime Vachier-Lagrave, Alexandr Predke and Alexei Shirov, qualified for the FIDE Grand Prix 2022.

== Format ==
The tournament was played as an 11-round Swiss-system tournament.

=== Tie-breaks ===
For players who finished on the same score, final position was determined by the following tie-breaks, in order:

- Buchholz Cut 1 method — "the sum of the scores of each of the opponents of a player" but "reduced by the lowest score of the opponents";
- Buchholz method — "the sum of the scores of each of the opponents of a player";
- Sonneborn–Berger score — "the sum of the scores of the opponents a player has defeated (including wins by forfeit) and half the scores of the players with whom he has drawn";
- The results of individual games between tied players;
- Drawing of lots.

This was a change from the 2019 tournament, in which the average opponent rating (excluding the lowest rated opponent) was used as the first tie-break.

=== Venue and schedule ===
The tournament was originally scheduled to run from 27 October to 7 November 2021 on the Isle of Man. However, due to complications arising from the COVID-19 pandemic in the United Kingdom, FIDE announced it would change the venue. Their stated concerns were that too many attendees would have to self-isolate under COVID-19 travel quarantine rules in the United Kingdom. On 9 August FIDE announced Riga, capital of Latvia, as the new venue. Due to a rise in COVID-19 cases, Latvia went into a lockdown beginning on 21 October, but FIDE announced that the Grand Swiss tournaments were exempt from this lockdown, and would proceed as scheduled.

The 11 rounds were played from 27 October to 7 November, with a rest day on 2 November. 25 October was scheduled as the "Arrivals" day, with the opening ceremony on 26 October and the closing ceremony on 8 November. Games started at 2pm local time. (Note: The tournament regulations say 3pm, but this was later changed to 2pm.) This corresponded to 11:00 UTC from 27 to 30 October, and 12:00 UTC from 31 October onwards.

== Qualifiers ==
Originally, 114 players were to be invited:

- 100 qualifiers by rating: the top 100 by the average of the 12 rating lists from 1 July 2020 to 1 June 2021;
- 1 place for the Women's World Chess Champion, Ju Wenjun;
- 4 places, one nominated by each of the four FIDE continental presidents;
- 4 nominations of the FIDE president;
- 5 nominations of the organizer, including 2 local nominees, and 1 online qualifier.

In August 2021, a list of 100 qualifiers by rating, plus 20 reserves, was announced. A number of players declined invitations, including 12 of the top 20 qualifiers: Magnus Carlsen and Ian Nepomniachtchi (playing the World Chess Championship 2021); Teimour Radjabov, Sergey Karjakin and Jan-Krzysztof Duda (already qualified for the Candidates); Wang Hao (retired); and Ding Liren, Wesley So, Anish Giri, Leinier Domínguez, Viswanathan Anand and Veselin Topalov. In September 2021, 114 players were announced as playing.

In the week before the tournament, a number of players withdrew due to concerns over the COVID-19 pandemic in Latvia. This included 5 of top 10 seeds: Alexander Grischuk, Richárd Rapport, Shakhriyar Mamedyarov, Hikaru Nakamura, Vidit Gujrathi; as well as Lê Quang Liêm, Salem Saleh, Bassem Amin, Gadir Guseinov, Arkadij Naiditsch, Étienne Bacrot, Maxime Lagarde, Sandro Mareco, Alexander Motylev, Ilya Smirin, Aravindh Chithambaram and Robert Hess.

The starting list of 108 participants is shown below.

== Results ==
The following table lists all participants, with the results from the 11 rounds. They are ranked according to the results, taking into account the tie-breaks. Nikita Vitiugov, Yuriy Kryvoruchko and Nils Grandelius are tied for 23rd place, as they scored the same on all tie-breaks.

Notation: "1 (W 93)" indicates a win (1 point) with white pieces (W) against player of rank 93 (Nijat Abasov). The first tiebreak (labeled BC1) is the Buchholz Cut 1 score, which was sufficient to determine the qualifiers.

Rank	Name	Rating	1	2	3	4	5	6	7	8	9	10	11	Total	BC1
1	(France) Alireza Firouzja	2770	1 (W 93)	1 (B 35)	1 (W 7)	0.5 (B 4)	0.5 (W 6)	0.5 (B 8)	1 (W 33)	1 (W 31)	0 (B 2)	1 (W 9)	0.5 (B 3)	8	68
2	(United States) Fabiano Caruana	2800	1 (W 55)	0.5 (B 18)	0.5 (W 36)	0.5 (B 35)	1 (W 9)	0.5 (B 33)	0.5 (W 13)	1 (B 25)	1 (W 1)	0.5 (B 6)	0.5 (W 7)	7.5	67
3	(Russia) Grigoriy Oparin	2654	0.5 (W 62)	1 (B 78)	0.5 (W 17)	0.5 (B 70)	0.5 (W 26)	0.5 (B 5)	1 (W 73)	1 (B 19)	0.5 (W 7)	1 (B 23)	0.5 (W 1)	7.5	63.5
4	(China) Yu Yangyi	2704	0.5 (W 5)	1 (B 63)	1 (W 61)	0.5 (W 1)	0.5 (B 49)	0.5 (B 13)	0.5 (W 15)	0.5 (B 28)	1 (W 33)	0.5 (B 8)	0.5 (W 6)	7	66.5
5	(Germany) Vincent Keymer	2630	0.5 (B 4)	1 (W 27)	0.5 (B 24)	0.5 (W 10)	0.5 (B 59)	0.5 (W 3)	0 (B 25)	1 (W 82)	1 (B 53)	1 (W 29)	0.5 (B 9)	7	65.5
6	(France) Maxime Vachier-Lagrave	2763	0.5 (B 52)	1 (W 50)	0.5 (B 71)	1 (W 60)	0.5 (B 1)	1 (W 32)	0.5 (B 31)	0.5 (W 8)	0.5 (B 11)	0.5 (W 2)	0.5 (B 4)	7	65
7	(Russia) Alexandr Predke	2666	1 (B 46)	1 (W 54)	0 (B 1)	0.5 (W 47)	1 (B 42)	0 (W 31)	1 (B 57)	1 (W 49)	0.5 (B 3)	0.5 (W 11)	0.5 (B 2)	7	64.5
8	(Spain) Alexei Shirov	2659	0.5 (B 43)	1 (W 87)	0.5 (B 51)	1 (W 92)	1 (B 36)	0.5 (W 1)	0.5 (B 14)	0.5 (B 6)	0.5 (W 23)	0.5 (W 4)	0.5 (B 10)	7	64.5
9	(England) David Howell	2658	1 (B 82)	0.5 (W 92)	0.5 (B 72)	0.5 (W 51)	0 (B 2)	1 (W 54)	1 (B 47)	1 (W 14)	1 (W 12)	0 (B 1)	0.5 (W 5)	7	62.5
10	(Armenia) Gabriel Sargissian	2664	0.5 (W 72)	0.5 (B 83)	1 (W 94)	0.5 (B 5)	1 (W 70)	0.5 (B 15)	0.5 (W 18)	0.5 (B 34)	1 (W 28)	0.5 (B 13)	0.5 (W 8)	7	61.5
11	(Spain) David Antón Guijarro	2658	0.5 (W 37)	0.5 (B 70)	1 (W 62)	0 (B 17)	1 (W 98)	1 (B 91)	0.5 (W 19)	1 (B 21)	0.5 (W 6)	0.5 (B 7)	0.5 (W 13)	7	61
12	(Ukraine) Anton Korobov	2690	0.5 (B 48)	1 (W 20)	0.5 (B 47)	0.5 (W 42)	1 (B 51)	0.5 (W 49)	0.5 (B 17)	1 (W 41)	0 (B 9)	0.5 (W 34)	1 (B 31)	7	60.5
13	(United States) Samuel Sevian	2654	0.5 (B 80)	1 (W 84)	0.5 (B 92)	1 (W 72)	0.5 (B 32)	0.5 (W 4)	0.5 (B 2)	1 (W 53)	0.5 (B 30)	0.5 (W 10)	0.5 (B 11)	7	60.5
14	(Russia) Andrey Esipenko	2720	0.5 (B 58)	0.5 (W 42)	0.5 (B 81)	1 (W 63)	0.5 (B 71)	1 (W 56)	0.5 (W 8)	0 (B 9)	1 (B 64)	1 (W 31)	0.5 (B 15)	7	60
15	(Romania) Bogdan-Daniel Deac	2643	0.5 (B 89)	0.5 (W 104)	1 (B 106)	0.5 (W 53)	1 (B 29)	0.5 (W 10)	0.5 (B 4)	0.5 (W 24)	0.5 (B 18)	1 (B 38)	0.5 (W 14)	7	60
16	(Russia) Vladislav Artemiev	2699	1 (B 76)	0.5 (W 51)	0.5 (B 75)	0.5 (W 31)	0.5 (B 50)	0.5 (W 47)	0.5 (B 48)	0.5 (W 52)	1 (B 49)	0.5 (W 17)	1 (B 34)	7	56.5
17	(Armenia) Manuel Petrosyan	2605	1 (B 99)	0.5 (W 32)	0.5 (B 3)	1 (W 11)	0.5 (W 18)	0.5 (B 23)	0.5 (W 12)	0.5 (B 22)	0.5 (W 38)	0.5 (B 16)	0.5 (W 21)	6.5	66.5
18	(India) Nihal Sarin	2652	1 (W 101)	0.5 (W 2)	1 (B 65)	0.5 (W 32)	0.5 (B 17)	0.5 (W 53)	0.5 (B 10)	0.5 (B 38)	0.5 (W 15)	0.5 (B 21)	0.5 (W 19)	6.5	64
19	(Russia) Daniil Dubov	2714	0.5 (B 42)	0.5 (W 58)	1 (B 86)	0.5 (W 71)	0.5 (B 56)	1 (W 36)	0.5 (B 11)	0 (W 3)	1 (B 41)	0.5 (W 24)	0.5 (B 18)	6.5	61.5
20	(Ukraine) Yuriy Kuzubov	2624	0.5 (W 44)	0 (B 12)	0.5 (B 27)	1 (W 104)	1 (B 66)	0.5 (W 24)	0.5 (B 59)	0.5 (W 60)	1 (B 32)	0.5 (W 25)	0.5 (B 30)	6.5	61.5
21	(Russia) Vladimir Fedoseev	2704	0.5 (B 47)	1 (W 39)	0.5 (B 49)	0.5 (W 75)	0 (B 31)	1 (W 76)	1 (B 35)	0 (W 11)	1 (B 60)	0.5 (W 18)	0.5 (B 17)	6.5	59.5
22	(Russia) Sanan Sjugirov	2663	0.5 (B 88)	1 (W 57)	0 (B 48)	1 (W 58)	0.5 (B 47)	1 (W 39)	0.5 (B 49)	0.5 (W 17)	0.5 (B 29)	0.5 (W 30)	0.5 (W 23)	6.5	59.5
23	(Russia) Nikita Vitiugov	2727	0.5 (W 91)	0.5 (B 81)	0.5 (W 93)	1 (B 34)	0.5 (W 28)	0.5 (W 17)	1 (B 71)	1 (W 32)	0.5 (B 8)	0 (W 3)	0.5 (B 22)	6.5	59.5
24	(Ukraine) Yuriy Kryvoruchko	2686	1 (W 74)	0.5 (B 73)	0.5 (W 5)	0.5 (B 91)	0.5 (W 55)	0.5 (B 20)	1 (W 80)	0.5 (B 15)	0.5 (W 34)	0.5 (B 19)	0.5 (W 26)	6.5	59.5
25	(Sweden) Nils Grandelius	2662	0.5 (W 70)	0.5 (B 37)	0.5 (W 45)	1 (B 80)	0.5 (W 91)	0.5 (B 55)	1 (W 5)	0 (W 2)	0.5 (B 39)	0.5 (B 20)	1 (W 61)	6.5	59.5
26	(Armenia) Levon Aronian	2782	0.5 (B 50)	1 (W 52)	0.5 (B 60)	0.5 (W 48)	0.5 (B 3)	0.5 (W 71)	0 (B 41)	0.5 (W 39)	1 (B 76)	1 (W 56)	0.5 (B 24)	6.5	58.5
27	(United States) Jeffery Xiong	2700	0.5 (W 63)	0 (B 5)	0.5 (W 20)	1 (B 85)	1 (W 93)	0.5 (B 35)	0 (W 34)	1 (B 74)	0.5 (W 37)	1 (B 52)	0.5 (W 28)	6.5	58.5
28	(Russia) Alexey Sarana	2649	0 (B 92)	1 (W 82)	0.5 (B 54)	1 (W 76)	0.5 (B 23)	1 (W 72)	0.5 (B 53)	0.5 (W 4)	0 (B 10)	1 (W 57)	0.5 (B 27)	6.5	58
29	(Russia) Kirill Alekseenko	2710	1 (W 34)	0 (B 36)	0.5 (W 95)	1 (B 74)	0 (W 15)	0.5 (B 70)	1 (W 94)	1 (B 50)	0.5 (W 22)	0 (B 5)	1 (W 39)	6.5	58
30	(India) Pentala Harikrishna	2719	0.5 (W 81)	0 (B 91)	1 (W 107)	1 (B 95)	0.5 (W 35)	0.5 (B 61)	1 (W 55)	0.5 (B 33)	0.5 (W 13)	0.5 (B 22)	0.5 (W 20)	6.5	55.5
31	(India) Krishnan Sasikiran	2640	0.5 (B 104)	1 (W 89)	0.5 (W 38)	0.5 (B 16)	1 (W 21)	1 (B 7)	0.5 (W 6)	0 (B 1)	1 (W 40)	0 (B 14)	0 (W 12)	6	66
32	(Russia) Pavel Ponkratov	2659	1 (W 45)	0.5 (B 17)	1 (W 73)	0.5 (B 18)	0.5 (W 13)	0 (B 6)	1 (W 74)	0 (B 23)	0 (W 20)	1 (B 63)	0.5 (W 37)	6	62.5
33	(Russia) Evgeniy Najer	2654	0.5 (B 84)	1 (W 80)	1 (B 43)	0.5 (W 36)	1 (B 48)	0.5 (W 2)	0 (B 1)	0.5 (W 30)	0 (B 4)	0.5 (W 61)	0.5 (B 46)	6	62.5
34	(Ukraine) Kirill Shevchenko	2632	0 (B 29)	1 (W 105)	0.5 (B 66)	0 (W 23)	1 (B 87)	1 (W 65)	1 (B 27)	0.5 (W 10)	0.5 (B 24)	0.5 (B 12)	0 (W 16)	6	62.5
35	(United States) Dariusz Świercz	2647	1 (B 103)	0 (W 1)	1 (B 88)	0.5 (W 2)	0.5 (B 30)	0.5 (W 27)	0 (W 21)	0.5 (B 73)	1 (W 51)	0.5 (B 37)	0.5 (W 40)	6	62
36	(Croatia) Ivan Šarić	2644	1 (W 97)	1 (W 29)	0.5 (B 2)	0.5 (B 33)	0 (W 8)	0 (B 19)	0 (W 37)	1 (B 95)	1 (W 72)	0.5 (B 40)	0.5 (W 44)	6	60.5
37	(Armenia) Samvel Ter-Sahakyan	2607	0.5 (B 11)	0.5 (W 25)	0.5 (B 56)	0 (W 50)	0.5 (B 52)	1 (W 68)	1 (B 36)	0.5 (W 59)	0.5 (B 27)	0.5 (W 35)	0.5 (B 32)	6	60
38	(Iran) Parham Maghsoodloo	2701	1 (B 86)	0.5 (W 75)	0.5 (B 31)	0 (W 49)	1 (B 81)	0.5 (W 50)	1 (B 61)	0.5 (W 18)	0.5 (B 17)	0 (W 15)	0.5 (B 41)	6	58
39	(Turkey) Mustafa Yılmaz	2626	0.5 (W 40)	0 (B 21)	0.5 (W 98)	1 (B 107)	1 (W 44)	0 (B 22)	1 (W 91)	0.5 (B 26)	0.5 (W 25)	1 (W 59)	0 (B 29)	6	58
40	(Ukraine) Pavel Eljanov	2691	0.5 (B 39)	0 (W 47)	0.5 (B 85)	1 (W 46)	0.5 (B 54)	1 (W 51)	0.5 (B 50)	1 (W 48)	0 (B 31)	0.5 (W 36)	0.5 (B 35)	6	57.5
41	(Ukraine) Andrei Volokitin	2652	0.5 (B 100)	0.5 (W 106)	0.5 (B 76)	0.5 (W 54)	1 (B 43)	0.5 (W 48)	1 (W 26)	0 (B 12)	0 (W 19)	1 (B 70)	0.5 (W 38)	6	57
42	(France) Jules Moussard	2632	0.5 (W 19)	0.5 (B 14)	1 (W 79)	0.5 (B 12)	0 (W 7)	0 (B 80)	0.5 (W 67)	0.5 (B 94)	0.5 (W 97)	1 (B 84)	1 (W 77)	6	56
43	(Chile) Cristobal Henriquez Villagra	2608	0.5 (W 8)	1 (B 69)	0 (W 33)	0.5 (B 61)	0 (W 41)	0.5 (B 93)	0.5 (W 96)	0.5 (B 91)	1 (W 79)	1 (B 55)	0.5 (W 53)	6	54
44	(Netherlands) Jorden van Foreest	2691	0.5 (B 20)	0 (W 48)	0.5 (B 57)	1 (W 88)	0 (B 39)	0.5 (W 82)	0 (B 51)	1 (W 87)	1 (B 94)	1 (W 47)	0.5 (B 36)	6	54
45	(Russia) Vadim Zvjaginsev	2609	0 (B 32)	1 (W 99)	0.5 (B 25)	0 (W 56)	0.5 (B 68)	0.5 (W 64)	0 (B 58)	1 (W 89)	1 (B 86)	0.5 (W 60)	1 (B 71)	6	54
46	(Russia) Mikhail Antipov	2619	0 (W 7)	0 (B 96)	1 (W 97)	0 (B 40)	1 (W 107)	0.5 (B 77)	0.5 (W 75)	1 (B 93)	1 (W 50)	0.5 (B 66)	0.5 (W 33)	6	52
47	(Ukraine) Ruslan Ponomariov	2631	0.5 (W 21)	1 (B 40)	0.5 (W 12)	0.5 (B 7)	0.5 (W 22)	0.5 (B 16)	0 (W 9)	0.5 (B 65)	0.5 (W 70)	0 (B 44)	1 (W 80)	5.5	63.5
48	(Armenia) Robert Hovhannisyan	2622	0.5 (W 12)	1 (B 44)	1 (W 22)	0.5 (B 26)	0 (W 33)	0.5 (B 41)	0.5 (W 16)	0 (B 40)	0.5 (B 71)	0.5 (W 64)	0.5 (B 60)	5.5	62
49	(Norway) Aryan Tari	2646	0.5 (B 106)	1 (W 100)	0.5 (W 21)	1 (B 38)	0.5 (W 4)	0.5 (B 12)	0.5 (W 22)	0 (B 7)	0 (W 16)	0.5 (B 65)	0.5 (W 67)	5.5	62
50	(Iran) Amin Tabatabaei	2639	0.5 (W 26)	0 (B 6)	1 (W 100)	1 (B 37)	0.5 (W 16)	0.5 (B 38)	0.5 (W 40)	0 (W 29)	0 (B 46)	1 (B 73)	0.5 (W 65)	5.5	61.5
51	(Croatia) Ante Brkic	2644	1 (W 77)	0.5 (B 16)	0.5 (W 8)	0.5 (B 9)	0 (W 12)	0 (B 40)	1 (W 44)	0.5 (W 71)	0 (B 35)	1 (B 97)	0.5 (W 66)	5.5	61.5
52	(United States) Hans Niemann	2638	0.5 (W 6)	0 (B 26)	0.5 (W 67)	0.5 (B 78)	0.5 (W 37)	1 (B 98)	1 (W 62)	0.5 (B 16)	0.5 (B 59)	0 (W 27)	0.5 (B 57)	5.5	60
53	(Czech Republic) David Navara	2691	0.5 (W 94)	0.5 (B 95)	1 (W 83)	0.5 (B 15)	1 (W 75)	0.5 (B 18)	0.5 (W 28)	0 (B 13)	0 (W 5)	0.5 (B 58)	0.5 (B 43)	5.5	59
54	(Uzbekistan) Nodirbek Yakubboev	2621	1 (W 96)	0 (B 7)	0.5 (W 28)	0.5 (B 41)	0.5 (W 40)	0 (B 9)	0.5 (W 77)	1 (B 75)	0.5 (W 55)	0.5 (B 69)	0.5 (B 64)	5.5	59
55	(Russia) Maksim Chigaev	2639	0 (B 2)	1 (W 101)	1 (B 104)	0.5 (W 59)	0.5 (B 24)	0.5 (W 25)	0 (B 30)	0.5 (W 57)	0.5 (B 54)	0 (W 43)	1 (B 88)	5.5	58
56	(Uzbekistan) Nodirbek Abdusattorov	2646	0.5 (W 65)	0.5 (B 107)	0.5 (W 37)	1 (B 45)	0.5 (W 19)	0 (B 14)	0.5 (W 70)	0.5 (B 72)	1 (W 73)	0 (B 26)	0.5 (W 62)	5.5	58
57	(India) Raunak Sadhwani	2609	0.5 (W 79)	0 (B 22)	0.5 (W 44)	0.5 (B 77)	1 (W 69)	1 (B 75)	0 (W 7)	0.5 (B 55)	1 (W 91)	0 (B 28)	0.5 (W 52)	5.5	57.5
58	(India) Arjun Erigaisi	2634	0.5 (W 14)	0.5 (B 19)	0.5 (W 96)	0 (B 22)	1 (W 78)	0 (B 74)	1 (W 45)	0.5 (B 80)	0.5 (W 65)	0.5 (W 53)	0.5 (B 59)	5.5	57
59	(Poland) Radosław Wojtaszek	2691	1 (W 85)	0.5 (B 61)	0.5 (W 91)	0.5 (B 55)	0.5 (W 5)	0.5 (B 73)	0.5 (W 20)	0.5 (B 37)	0.5 (W 52)	0 (B 39)	0.5 (W 58)	5.5	57
60	(Russia) Anton Demchenko	2651	0.5 (W 67)	1 (B 98)	0.5 (W 26)	0 (B 6)	0 (W 73)	1 (B 83)	1 (W 95)	0.5 (B 20)	0 (W 21)	0.5 (B 45)	0.5 (W 48)	5.5	57
61	(Germany) Matthias Bluebaum	2640	1 (B 105)	0.5 (W 59)	0 (B 4)	0.5 (W 43)	1 (B 92)	0.5 (W 30)	0 (W 38)	0.5 (B 70)	1 (W 80)	0.5 (B 33)	0 (B 25)	5.5	57
62	(Uzbekistan) Javokhir Sindarov	2587	0.5 (B 3)	0.5 (W 64)	0 (B 11)	0.5 (W 86)	0.5 (B 63)	1 (W 99)	0 (B 52)	0.5 (W 66)	1 (B 81)	0.5 (W 71)	0.5 (B 56)	5.5	56
63	(China) Zhou Jianchao	2629	0.5 (B 27)	0 (W 4)	1 (B 89)	0 (B 14)	0.5 (W 62)	1 (W 84)	0.5 (B 82)	0 (W 64)	1 (B 88)	0 (W 32)	1 (B 87)	5.5	55.5
64	(Peru) Jorge Cori	2655	0.5 (W 78)	0.5 (B 62)	0 (W 70)	0.5 (B 67)	0.5 (W 83)	0.5 (B 45)	1 (W 85)	1 (B 63)	0 (W 14)	0.5 (B 48)	0.5 (W 54)	5.5	55
65	(Australia) Temur Kuybokarov	2549	0.5 (B 56)	1 (W 102)	0 (W 18)	0.5 (B 93)	0.5 (W 77)	0 (B 34)	1 (B 81)	0.5 (W 47)	0.5 (B 58)	0.5 (W 49)	0.5 (B 50)	5.5	53.5
66	(Russia) Peter Svidler	2694	0.5 (W 95)	0.5 (B 94)	0.5 (W 34)	0.5 (B 73)	0 (W 20)	0.5 (B 85)	0.5 (W 72)	0.5 (B 62)	1 (W 74)	0.5 (W 46)	0.5 (B 51)	5.5	53
67	(Czech Republic) Thai Dai Van Nguyen	2577	0.5 (B 60)	0 (W 71)	0.5 (B 52)	0.5 (W 64)	0.5 (B 102)	0.5 (W 81)	0.5 (B 42)	0.5 (W 86)	0.5 (B 96)	1 (W 76)	0.5 (B 49)	5.5	51
68	(Israel) Boris Gelfand	2680	0 (W 73)	0.5 (B 74)	0.5 (W 78)	0.5 (B 83)	0.5 (W 45)	0 (B 37)	0.5 (W 84)	0.5 (B 97)	1 (W 95)	0.5 (B 72)	1 (W 85)	5.5	49.5
69	(Russia) Aleksandr Rakhmanov	2657	0.5 (B 87)	0 (W 43)	0.5 (B 84)	0.5 (W 106)	0 (B 57)	0.5 (W 89)	0.5 (B 92)	1 (W 101)	0.5 (B 82)	0.5 (W 54)	1 (B 83)	5.5	47.5
70	(Serbia) Aleksandar Indjic	2612	0.5 (B 25)	0.5 (W 11)	1 (B 64)	0.5 (W 3)	0 (B 10)	0.5 (W 29)	0.5 (B 56)	0.5 (W 61)	0.5 (B 47)	0 (W 41)	0.5 (B 81)	5	62.5
71	(Germany) Alexander Donchenko	2648	0.5 (W 98)	1 (B 67)	0.5 (W 6)	0.5 (B 19)	0.5 (W 14)	0.5 (B 26)	0 (W 23)	0.5 (B 51)	0.5 (W 48)	0.5 (B 62)	0 (W 45)	5	61.5
72	(India) Rameshbabu Praggnanandhaa	2618	0.5 (B 10)	1 (W 90)	0.5 (W 9)	0 (B 13)	1 (W 96)	0 (B 28)	0.5 (B 66)	0.5 (W 56)	0 (B 36)	0.5 (W 68)	0.5 (B 75)	5	59.5
73	(Germany) Dmitrij Kollars	2621	1 (B 68)	0.5 (W 24)	0 (B 32)	0.5 (W 66)	1 (B 60)	0.5 (W 59)	0 (B 3)	0.5 (W 35)	0 (B 56)	0 (W 50)	1 (W 97)	5	59
74	(Ukraine) Vladimir Onischuk	2622	0 (B 24)	0.5 (W 68)	1 (B 90)	0 (W 29)	1 (B 99)	1 (W 58)	0 (B 32)	0 (W 27)	0 (B 66)	1 (W 96)	0.5 (W 79)	5	55.5
75	(India) Gukesh D	2640	1 (W 108)	0.5 (B 38)	0.5 (W 16)	0.5 (B 21)	0 (B 53)	0 (W 57)	0.5 (B 46)	0 (W 54)	0.5 (W 100)	1 (B 101)	0.5 (W 72)	5	55
76	(Argentina) Alan Pichot	2628	0 (W 16)	1 (B 108)	0.5 (W 41)	0 (B 28)	1 (W 101)	0 (B 21)	0.5 (W 97)	1 (B 96)	0 (W 26)	0 (B 67)	1 (W 100)	5	54
77	(Russia) Maxim Matlakov	2682	0 (B 51)	0.5 (W 85)	0.5 (B 87)	0.5 (W 57)	0.5 (B 65)	0.5 (W 46)	0.5 (B 54)	0.5 (W 88)	0.5 (B 83)	1 (W 82)	0 (B 42)	5	52
78	(Russia) Aleksandra Goryachkina	2602	0.5 (B 64)	0 (W 3)	0.5 (B 68)	0.5 (W 52)	0 (B 58)	0.5 (W 90)	0.5 (B 102)	0 (B 79)	0.5 (W 103)	1 (W 92)	1 (B 99)	5	51
79	(Bulgaria) Ivan Cheparinov	2659	0.5 (B 57)	0.5 (W 88)	0 (B 42)	0.5 (W 87)	0 (B 82)	0.5 (W 86)	0.5 (B 106)	1 (W 78)	0 (B 43)	1 (W 94)	0.5 (B 74)	5	49.5
80	(Georgia (country)) Baadur Jobava	2582	0.5 (W 13)	0 (B 33)	1 (B 102)	0 (W 25)	1 (B 86)	1 (W 42)	0 (B 24)	0.5 (W 58)	0 (B 61)	0.5 (W 99)	0 (B 47)	4.5	57
81	Vladislav Kovalev	2634	0.5 (B 30)	0.5 (W 23)	0.5 (W 14)	0.5 (B 96)	0 (W 38)	0.5 (B 67)	0 (W 65)	1 (B 104)	0 (W 62)	0.5 (B 100)	0.5 (W 70)	4.5	55.5
82	(Serbia) Velimir Ivić	2606	0 (W 9)	0 (B 28)	0.5 (W 105)	1 (B 108)	1 (W 79)	0.5 (B 44)	0.5 (W 63)	0 (B 5)	0.5 (W 69)	0 (B 77)	0.5 (W 89)	4.5	55.5
83	(India) S. P. Sethuraman	2620	0.5 (B 90)	0.5 (W 10)	0 (B 53)	0.5 (W 68)	0.5 (B 64)	0 (W 60)	0.5 (B 89)	1 (W 106)	0.5 (W 77)	0.5 (B 85)	0 (W 69)	4.5	53
84	(Poland) Mateusz Bartel	2597	0.5 (W 33)	0 (B 13)	0.5 (W 69)	0.5 (B 94)	0.5 (W 95)	0 (B 63)	0.5 (B 68)	0.5 (W 90)	1 (B 102)	0 (W 42)	0.5 (B 86)	4.5	52.5
85	(Armenia) Haik M. Martirosyan	2624	0 (B 59)	0.5 (B 77)	0.5 (W 40)	0 (W 27)	1 (B 104)	0.5 (W 66)	0 (B 64)	0.5 (W 92)	1 (B 90)	0.5 (W 83)	0 (B 68)	4.5	52.5
86	(Azerbaijan) Vasif Durarbayli	2629	0 (W 38)	1 (B 97)	0 (W 19)	0.5 (B 62)	0 (W 80)	0.5 (B 79)	1 (W 98)	0.5 (B 67)	0 (W 45)	0.5 (B 89)	0.5 (W 84)	4.5	52
87	(Egypt) Ahmed Adly	2602	0.5 (W 69)	0 (B 8)	0.5 (W 77)	0.5 (B 79)	0 (W 34)	0 (B 97)	1 (W 103)	0 (B 44)	1 (W 98)	1 (B 93)	0 (W 63)	4.5	52
88	(India) Surya Shekhar Ganguly	2617	0.5 (W 22)	0.5 (B 79)	0 (W 35)	0 (B 44)	1 (W 105)	0.5 (B 96)	0.5 (W 93)	0.5 (B 77)	0 (W 63)	1 (B 91)	0 (W 55)	4.5	51.5
89	(Uzbekistan) Shamsiddin Vokhidov	2521	0.5 (W 15)	0 (B 31)	0 (W 63)	0 (B 101)	1 (W 103)	0.5 (B 69)	0.5 (W 83)	0 (B 45)	1 (B 108)	0.5 (W 86)	0.5 (B 82)	4.5	51.5
90	(India) Adhiban Baskaran	2672	0.5 (W 83)	0 (B 72)	0 (W 74)	0 (B 98)	1 (W 108)	0.5 (B 78)	0.5 (W 101)	0.5 (B 84)	0 (W 85)	0.5 (B 103)	1 (W 104)	4.5	44
91	(Russia) Aleksey Dreev	2635	0.5 (B 23)	1 (W 30)	0.5 (B 59)	0.5 (W 24)	0.5 (B 25)	0 (W 11)	0 (B 39)	0.5 (W 43)	0 (B 57)	0 (W 88)	0.5 (B 92)	4	60.5
92	(Latvia) Arturs Neikšāns	2570	1 (W 28)	0.5 (B 9)	0.5 (W 13)	0 (B 8)	0 (W 61)	0 (B 94)	0.5 (W 69)	0.5 (B 85)	0.5 (W 93)	0 (B 78)	0.5 (W 91)	4	56
93	(Azerbaijan) Nijat Abasov	2638	0 (B 1)	1 (W 103)	0.5 (B 23)	0.5 (W 65)	0 (B 27)	0.5 (W 43)	0.5 (B 88)	0 (W 46)	0.5 (B 92)	0 (W 87)	0.5 (B 94)	4	55.5
94	(Ukraine) Martyn Kravtsiv	2625	0.5 (B 53)	0.5 (W 66)	0 (B 10)	0.5 (W 84)	0.5 (B 106)	1 (W 92)	0 (B 29)	0.5 (W 42)	0 (W 44)	0 (B 79)	0.5 (W 93)	4	54
95	(Armenia) Sergei Movsesian	2627	0.5 (B 66)	0.5 (W 53)	0.5 (B 29)	0 (W 30)	0.5 (B 84)	1 (W 106)	0 (B 60)	0 (W 36)	0 (B 68)	0.5 (W 102)	0.5 (B 96)	4	53.5
96	(Azerbaijan) Rauf Mamedov	2673	0 (B 54)	1 (W 46)	0.5 (B 58)	0.5 (W 81)	0 (B 72)	0.5 (W 88)	0.5 (B 43)	0 (W 76)	0.5 (W 67)	0 (B 74)	0.5 (W 95)	4	52.5
97	(Azerbaijan) Aydin Suleymanli	2541	0 (B 36)	0 (W 86)	0 (B 46)	0.5 (B 105)	1 (W 100)	1 (W 87)	0.5 (B 76)	0.5 (W 68)	0.5 (B 42)	0 (W 51)	0 (B 73)	4	52
98	(Denmark) Jonas Buhl Bjerre	2569	0.5 (B 71)	0 (W 60)	0.5 (B 39)	1 (W 90)	0 (B 11)	0 (W 52)	0 (B 86)	0.5 (W 99)	0 (B 87)	1 (W 107)	0.5 (B 102)	4	50.5
99	(Kazakhstan) Rinat Jumabayev	2658	0 (W 17)	0 (B 45)	0.5 (W 103)	1 (B 100)	0 (W 74)	0 (B 62)	0.5 (W 107)	0.5 (B 98)	1 (W 106)	0.5 (B 80)	0 (W 78)	4	47.5
100	(Iceland) Hjorvar Steinn Gretarsson	2577	0.5 (W 41)	0 (B 49)	0 (B 50)	0 (W 99)	0 (B 97)	1 (W 108)	1 (B 105)	0.5 (W 102)	0.5 (B 75)	0.5 (W 81)	0 (B 76)	4	47
101	(North Macedonia) Kiril Georgiev	2577	0 (B 18)	0 (B 55)	0.5 (W 108)	1 (W 89)	0 (B 76)	0.5 (W 102)	0.5 (B 90)	0 (B 69)	1 (W 104)	0 (W 75)	0.5 (B 107)	4	47
102	(Russia) David Paravyan	2642	0.5 (W 107)	0 (B 65)	0 (W 80)	0.5 (B 103)	0.5 (W 67)	0.5 (B 101)	0.5 (W 78)	0.5 (B 100)	0 (W 84)	0.5 (B 95)	0.5 (W 98)	4	45
103	(Latvia) Nikita Meshkovs	2550	0 (W 35)	0 (B 93)	0.5 (B 99)	0.5 (W 102)	0 (B 89)	0.5 (W 105)	0 (B 87)	1 (W 107)	0.5 (B 78)	0.5 (W 90)	0.5 (B 108)	4	43
104	(Latvia) Normunds Miezis	2467	0.5 (W 31)	0.5 (B 15)	0 (W 55)	0 (B 20)	0 (W 85)	0.5 (B 107)	1 (B 108)	0 (W 81)	0 (B 101)	1 (W 105)	0 (B 90)	3.5	49
105	(Serbia) Luka Budisavljević	2508	0 (W 61)	0 (B 34)	0.5 (B 82)	0.5 (W 97)	0 (B 88)	0.5 (B 103)	0 (W 100)	0.5 (W 108)	0.5 (B 107)	0 (B 104)	1 (W 106)	3.5	42
106	(Netherlands) Lucas van Foreest	2543	0.5 (W 49)	0.5 (B 41)	0 (W 15)	0.5 (B 69)	0.5 (W 94)	0 (B 95)	0.5 (W 79)	0 (B 83)	0 (B 99)	0.5 (W 108)	0 (B 105)	3	49
107	(Chile) Ivan Morovic Fernandez	2510	0.5 (B 102)	0.5 (W 56)	0 (B 30)	0 (W 39)	0 (B 46)	0.5 (W 104)	0.5 (B 99)	0 (B 103)	0.5 (W 105)	0 (B 98)	0.5 (W 101)	3	47.5
108	(Madagascar) Fy Antenaina Rakotomaharo	2484	0 (B 75)	0 (W 76)	0.5 (B 101)	0 (W 82)	0 (B 90)	0 (B 100)	0 (W 104)	0.5 (B 105)	0 (W 89)	0.5 (B 106)	0.5 (W 103)	2	42.5
