= Egor Bogdanov =

Ukrainian chess grandmaster (born 1996)

Personal information
- Born: April 23, 1996 (age 30) Kherson, Ukraine

Chess career
- Country: Ukraine
- Title: Grandmaster (2025)
- FIDE rating: 2493 (July 2026)
- Peak rating: 2521 (August 2025)

Egor Bogdanov is a Ukrainian chess grandmaster.

== Chess career ==
In August 2020, he tied for second place with Volodymyr Onyshchuk in the Ukraine Independence Day Schweppes, prevailing on tiebreak scores.

In July 2024, he tied for first place with Shahil Dey, Fabien Guilleux, and Radoslav Dimitrov in the 17th Plancoët Open A. He was ranked in second place after tiebreak scores.

He was awarded the Grandmaster title in 2025, after achieving a rating above 2500. He fulfilled the necessary norms at the:

- Uppsala GM Tournament in October 2019
- XXXIV Miedzynarodowy Festiwal Szachowy CRACOVIA 2023 Grupa A in January 2024
- Chess Week in Przeworsk - Round Robin Tournament GM norm 2024 in June 2024
