= Grand Chess Tour 2022 =

Series of chess tournaments

Grand Chess Tour
- 2022
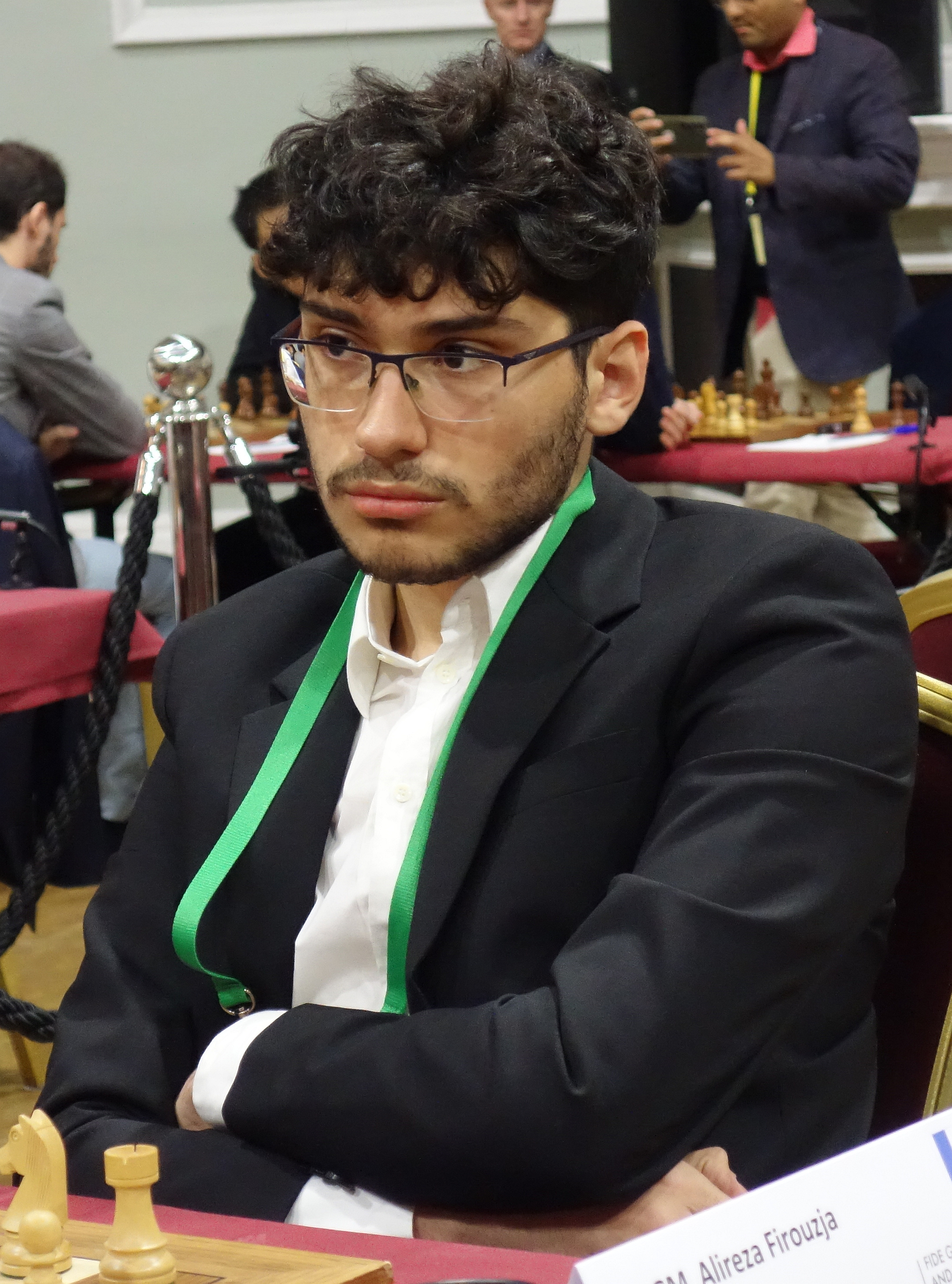
- 2022 Grand Chess Tour winner Alireza Firouzja.

Tournament information
- Dates: 3 May–13 September 2022
- Host(s): Bucharest; Warsaw; Zagreb; St. Louis

Final positions
- Champion: (France) Alireza Firouzja
- Runner-up: (United States) Wesley So
- 3rd place: (France) Maxime Vachier-Lagrave

Tournament statistics
- Most tournament titles: (France) Alireza Firouzja (2)
- Prize money leader: (France) Alireza Firouzja ($272,250)
- Points leader: (France) Alireza Firouzja (36.5)

The Grand Chess Tour 2022 was a series of chess tournaments, which was the seventh edition of the Grand Chess Tour. It consisted of five tournaments with a total prize pool of US$1.4 million, including two tournaments with classical time control and three tournaments with faster time controls. The winner of the tour was Alireza Firouzja.

== Format ==
The tour consisted of five tournaments, two classicals and three rapid & blitz, respectively. Rapid & Blitz tournaments consisted of two parts – rapid (2 points for win, 1 for draw) and blitz (1 point for win, 0.5 for draw). Combined result for both portions was counted in overall standings.

The tour points were awarded as follows:

Place	Points
1st	12/13*
2nd	10
3rd	8
4th	7
5th	6
6th	5
7th	4
8th	3
9th	2
10th	1

- If a player wins 1st place outright (without the need for a playoff), they are awarded 13 points instead of 12.
- Tour points are shared equally between tied players.

== Lineup ==
The lineup was announced on February 16, 2022. As in 2021, it consisted of nine players, including top-three finishers of previous edition. Remaining six players were selected, based on several factors, including URS, FIDE rating, "fighting spirit and sportsmanship".

Player	Country	FIDE Rating (January 2022)
Wesley So	United States	2772
Maxime Vachier-Lagrave	France	2761
Shakhriyar Mamedyarov	Azerbaijan	2767
Alireza Firouzja	France	2804
Fabiano Caruana	United States	2792
Ian Nepomniachtchi	FIDE (Note: Russian players' flags are displayed as the FIDE flag due to FIDE banning Russian and Belarusian flags from FIDE-rated events in response to the 2022 Russian invasion of Ukraine.)	2773
Levon Aronian	United States	2772
Richárd Rapport	Hungary	2763
Leinier Domínguez	United States	2752

== Schedule ==
Dates	Tournament Name	Host city
May 3–15, 2022	Superbet Chess Classic	Bucharest
May 17–24, 2022	Superbet Rapid & Blitz	Warsaw
July 18–25, 2022	SuperUnited Rapid & Blitz	Zagreb
August 24–31, 2022	Saint Louis Rapid & Blitz	St. Louis
August 31 – 13 September 2022	Sinquefield Cup	St. Louis

== Results ==
Dates	Tournament Name	Winner	Runner-up	Third place
May 3–15, 2022	Superbet Chess Classic	Maxime Vachier-Lagrave	Wesley So; Levon Aronian	–
May 17–24, 2022	Poland Rapid & Blitz	Jan-Krzysztof Duda (WC)	Levon Aronian; Viswanathan Anand (WC)	–
July 18–25, 2022	Croatia Rapid & Blitz	Magnus Carlsen (WC)	Maxime Vachier-Lagrave (France) Alireza Firouzja	–
August 24–31, 2022	Saint Louis Rapid & Blitz	(France) Alireza Firouzja	(United States) Hikaru Nakamura (WC)	(France) Maxime Vachier-Lagrave (United States) Fabiano Caruana
September 1–12, 2022	Sinquefield Cup	(France) Alireza Firouzja	(FIDE) Ian Nepomniachtchi	(United States) Wesley So (United States) Fabiano Caruana

== Tournaments ==
=== Superbet Chess Classic ===
The first leg of the Grand Chess Tour was held in Bucharest, Romania from 3–15 May 2022.

2022 GCT Superbet Chess Classic, 3–15 May Bucharest, Romania, Category XXI (2761.4)
	Player	Rating	1	2	3	4	5	6	7	8	9	10	Points	TB	TPR	Tour Points	Prize money
1	Maxime Vachier-Lagrave (FRA)	2750		½	0	½	1	½	½	1	½	1	5½	2	2843	10	$77,677
2	Wesley So (USA)	2766	½		½	½	½	½	1	½	1	½	5½	1	2841	10	$67,677
3	Levon Aronian (USA)	2765	1	½		1	½	½	½	½	½	½	5½	0	2841	10	$67,667
4	Leinier Domínguez (USA)	2753	½	½	0		½	1	½	0	1	½	4½		2762	6	$26,333
5	Fabiano Caruana (USA)	2786	0	½	½	½		½	½	½	1	½	4½		2759	6	$26,333
6	Bogdan-Daniel Deac (ROU)	2671	½	½	½	0	½		½	½	½	1	4½		2771	WC (6)	$26,333
7	Ian Nepomniachtchi (FIDE)	2773	½	0	½	½	½	½		1	0	½	4		2720	3.5	$17,250
8	Alireza Firouzja (FRA)	2804	0	½	½	1	½	½	0		½	½	4		2717	3.5	$17,250
9	Shakhriyar Mamedyarov (AZE)	2770	½	0	½	0	0	½	1	½		½	3½		2680	1.5	$11,750
10	Richárd Rapport (HUN)	2776	0	½	½	½	½	0	½	½	½		3½		2679	1.5	$11,750

First place playoff
Place	Player	Rapid rating	1	2	3	Score
1	Maxime Vachier-Lagrave (FRA)	2743		1	1	2
2	Wesley So (USA)	2784	0		1	1
3	Levon Aronian (USA)	2751	0	0		0

=== Superbet Rapid & Blitz Poland ===
The second leg of the Grand Chess Tour was held in Warsaw, Poland from 17 to 24 May 2022.

Final standings

2022 GCT Superbet Rapid & Blitz Poland, 19–23 May 2022, Warsaw, Poland
	Player	Rapid	Blitz	Total	Tour Points	Prize money
1	Jan-Krzysztof Duda (POL)	12	12	24	WC (13)	$40,000
T-2	Levon Aronian (USA)	10	13½	23½	9	$27,500
T-2	Viswanathan Anand (IND)	14	9½	23½	WC (9)	$27,500
4	Fabiano Caruana (USA)	9	14	23	7	$20,000
5	Wesley So (USA)	11	9½	20½	6	$15,000
6	Richard Rapport (HUN)	13	6½	19½	5	$11,000
7	Radosław Wojtaszek (POL)	7	6½	13½	WC (4)	$10,000
8	Anton Korobov (UKR)	5	7½	12½	WC (3)	$9,000
9	Kirill Shevchenko (UKR)	7	4½	11½	WC (2)	$8,000
10	IM David Gavrilescu (ROU)	2	6½	8½	WC (1)	$7,000

2022 GCT Superbet Rapid & Blitz Poland – Rapid, 19–21 May 2022, Warsaw, Poland
	Player	Rating	1	2	3	4	5	6	7	8	9	10	Points
1	Viswanathan Anand (IND)	2675		0	1	2	2	1	2	2	2	2	14
2	Richárd Rapport (HUN)	2785	2		0	0	1	2	2	2	2	2	13
3	Jan-Krzysztof Duda (POL)	2806	1	2		0	2	0	2	1	2	2	12
4	Wesley So (USA)	2770	0	2	2		1	1	1	2	1	1	11
5	Levon Aronian (USA)	2751	0	1	0	1		2	1	1	2	2	10
6	Fabiano Caruana (USA)	2790	1	0	2	1	0		1	1	1	2	9
7	Radosław Wojtaszek (POL)	2647	0	0	0	1	1	1		1	2	1	7
8	Kirill Shevchenko (UKR)	2573	0	0	1	0	1	1	1		1	2	7
9	Anton Korobov (UKR)	2677	0	0	0	1	0	1	0	1		2	5
10	IM David Gavrilescu (ROU)	2457	0	0	0	1	0	0	1	0	0		2

2022 GCT Superbet Rapid & Blitz Poland – Blitz, 22–23 May 2022, Warsaw, Poland
	Player	Rating	1	2	3	4	5	6	7	8	9	10	Points
1	Fabiano Caruana (USA)	2744		½ ½	½ 1	1 ½	1 1	1 1	1 1	1 0	1 1	1 0	14
2	Levon Aronian (USA)	2773	½ ½		½ ½	½ 1	½ 1	1 ½	1 1	1 ½	1 ½	1 1	13½
3	Jan-Krzysztof Duda (POL)	2760	½ 0	½ ½		0 1	0 1	1 0	½ 1	1 1	1 1	1 1	12
4	Viswanathan Anand (IND)	2758	0 ½	½ 0	1 0		1 ½	½ 0	½ 1	½ 1	0 ½	1 1	9½
5	Wesley So (USA)	2814	0 0	½ 0	1 0	0 ½		1 1	1 1	0 ½	½ 1	1 ½	9½
6	Anton Korobov (UKR)	2650	0 0	0 ½	0 1	½ 1	0 0		0 1	½ 1	0 1	0 1	7½
7	Richárd Rapport (HUN)	2646	0 0	0 0	½ 0	½ 0	0 0	1 0		0 1	1 1	½ 1	6½
8	Radosław Wojtaszek (POL)	2610	0 1	0 ½	0 0	½ 0	1 ½	½ 0	1 0		½ 0	½ ½	6½
9	IM David Gavrilescu (ROU)	2367	0 0	0 ½	0 0	1 ½	½ 0	1 0	0 0	½ 1		½ 1	6½
10	Kirill Shevchenko (UKR)	2624	0 1	0 0	0 0	0 0	0 ½	1 0	½ 0	½ ½	½ 0		4½

=== SuperUnited Rapid & Blitz Croatia ===
The third leg of the Grand Chess Tour was held in Zagreb, Croatia from 18 to 25 July 2022.

2022 GCT SuperUnited Rapid & Blitz Croatia, 20–24 July 2022, Zagreb, Croatia
	Player	Rapid	Blitz	Total	Tour Points	Prize money
1	Magnus Carlsen (NOR)	11	11½	22½	WC (13)	$40,000
T-2	Maxime Vachier-Lagrave (FRA)	10	12	22	9	$27,500
T-2	Alireza Firouzja (FRA)	11	11	22	9	$27,500
T-4	Ian Nepomniachtchi (FIDE)	9	12	21	6.5	$17,500
T-4	Wesley So (USA)	11	10	21	6.5	$17,500
6	Jorden van Foreest (NED)	12	7	19	WC (5)	$11,000
T-7	Shakhriyar Mamedyarov (AZE)	8	7	15	3.5	$9,500
T-7	Leinier Domínguez (USA)	7	8	15	3.5	$9,500
9	Veselin Topalov (BUL)	5	7	12	WC (2)	$8,000
10	Ivan Šarić (CRO)	6	4½	10½	WC (1)	$7,000

2022 GCT SuperUnited Rapid & Blitz Croatia – Rapid, 20–22 July 2022, Zagreb, Croatia
	Player	Rating	1	2	3	4	5	6	7	8	9	10	Points
1	Jorden van Foreest (NED)	2645		0	2	0	1	2	2	2	1	2	12
2	Magnus Carlsen (NOR)	2847	2		1	1	1	1	0	1	2	2	11
3	Alireza Firouzja (FRA)	2670	0	1		1	1	1	2	1	2	2	11
4	Wesley So (USA)	2779	2	1	1		1	1	1	1	2	1	11
5	Maxime Vachier-Lagrave (FRA)	2764	1	1	1	1		0	2	1	1	2	10
6	Ian Nepomniachtchi (FIDE)	2821	0	1	1	1	2		0	2	0	2	9
7	Shakhriyar Mamedyarov (AZE)	2699	0	2	0	1	0	2		1	1	1	8
8	Leinier Domínguez (USA)	2729	0	1	1	1	1	0	1		1	1	7
9	Ivan Šarić (CRO)	2645	1	0	0	0	1	2	1	1		0	6
10	Veselin Topalov (BUL)	2627	0	0	0	1	0	0	1	1	2		5

2022 GCT SuperUnited Rapid & Blitz Croatia – Blitz, 23–24 July 2022, Zagreb, Croatia
	Player	Rating	1	2	3	4	5	6	7	8	9	10	Points
1	Maxime Vachier-Lagrave (FRA)	2784		0 1	0 ½	½ 1	½ ½	1 1	1 1	0 1	0 1	1 1	12
2	Ian Nepomniachtchi (FIDE)	2740	1 0		0 0	½ 0	½ 1	1 1	1 ½	½ 1	1 1	1 1	12
3	Magnus Carlsen (NOR)	2828	1 ½	1 1		1 0	0 ½	0 ½	1 ½	1 ½	1 1	1 0	11½
4	Alireza Firouzja (FRA)	2791	½ 0	½ 1	0 1		½ 1	0 1	½ ½	½ 1	1 1	0 1	11
5	Wesley So (USA)	2763	½ ½	½ 0	½ 1	½ 0		½ 0	½ 1	1 1	0 ½	1 1	10
6	Leinier Domínguez (USA)	2729	0 0	0 0	1 ½	1 0	½ 1		½ 0	1 ½	½ 0	1 ½	8
7	Veselin Topalov (BUL)	2667	0 0	0 ½	0 ½	½ ½	½ 0	½ 1		1 0	1 1	0 0	7
8	Shakhriyar Mamedyarov (AZE)	2778	1 0	½ 0	0 ½	½ 0	0 0	0 ½	0 1		½ ½	1 1	7
9	Jorden van Foreest (NED)	2609	1 0	0 0	0 0	0 0	1 ½	½ 1	0 0	½ ½		1 1	7
10	Ivan Šarić (CRO)	2550	0 0	0 0	0 1	1 0	0 0	0 ½	1 1	0 0	0 0		4½

=== Saint Louis Rapid & Blitz ===
2022 GCT Saint Louis Rapid & Blitz, 26–30 August 2022, St. Louis, Missouri, United States
	Player	Rapid	Blitz	Total	Tour Points	Prize money
1	Alireza Firouzja (FRA)	11	15	26	13	$40,000
2	Hikaru Nakamura (USA)	7	14	21	WC (10)	$30,000
T-3	Fabiano Caruana (USA)	8	11	19	7.5	$22,500
T-3	Maxime Vachier-Lagrave (FRA)	11	8	19	7.5	$22,500
5	Ian Nepomniachtchi (FIDE)	9	9	18	6	$15,000
6	Shakhriyar Mamedyarov (AZE)	9	8½	17½	5	$11,000
T-7	Levon Aronian (USA)	8	9	17	3.5	$9,500
T-7	Jeffery Xiong (USA)	9	8	17	WC (3.5)	$9,500
9	Sam Shankland (USA)	10	3½	13½	WC (2)	$8,000
10	Leinier Domínguez (USA)	8	4	12	1	$7,000

2022 GCT Saint Louis Rapid & Blitz – Rapid, 26–28 August 2022, St. Louis, Missouri, United States
	Player	Rating	1	2	3	4	5	6	7	8	9	10	Points
1	Alireza Firouzja (FRA)	2704		1	1	1	2	1	0	1	2	2	11
2	Maxime Vachier-Lagrave (FRA)	2763	1		1	1	2	1	2	1	1	1	11
3	Sam Shankland (USA)	2616	1	1		2	1	0	1	1	1	2	10
4	Ian Nepomniachtchi (FIDE)	2795	1	1	0		2	1	1	1	1	1	9
5	Shakhriyar Mamedyarov (AZE)	2695	0	0	1	0		2	2	1	2	1	9
6	Jeffery Xiong (USA)	2725	1	1	2	1	0		2	1	1	0	9
7	Fabiano Caruana (USA)	2766	2	0	1	1	0	0		1	1	2	8
8	Levon Aronian (USA)	2728	1	1	1	1	1	1	1		1	0	8
9	Leinier Domínguez (USA)	2705	0	1	1	1	0	1	1	1		2	8
10	Hikaru Nakamura (USA)	2836	0	1	0	1	1	2	0	2	0		7

2022 GCT Saint Louis Rapid & Blitz – Blitz, 29–30 August 2022, St. Louis, Missouri, United States
	Player	Rating	1	2	3	4	5	6	7	8	9	10	Points
1	Alireza Firouzja (FRA)	2795		½ 1	½ 1	½ 1	1 ½	1 1	½ 1	1 ½	1 1	1 1	15
2	Hikaru Nakamura (USA)	2850	½ 0		1 1	1 0	½ 1	½ ½	1 1	1 1	1 1	1 1	14
3	Fabiano Caruana (USA)	2847	½ 0	0 0		1 ½	½ ½	½ 1	0 1	½ 1	1 1	1 1	11
4	Levon Aronian (USA)	2850	½ 0	0 1	0 ½		1 ½	1 0	1 ½	0 ½	1 0	1 ½	9
5	Ian Nepomniachtchi (FIDE)	2791	0 ½	½ 0	½ ½	0 ½		1 ½	1 ½	½ ½	1 0	½ 1	9
6	Shakhriyar Mamedyarov (AZE)	2710	0 0	½ ½	½ 0	0 1	0 ½		0 0	1 ½	1 1	1 1	8½
7	Jeffery Xiong (USA)	2714	½ 0	0 0	1 0	0 ½	0 ½	1 1		½ ½	1 0	1 ½	8
8	Maxime Vachier-Lagrave (FRA)	2812	0 ½	0 0	½ 0	1 ½	½ ½	0 ½	½ ½		1 1	½ ½	8
9	Leinier Domínguez (USA)	2714	0 0	0 0	0 0	0 1	0 1	0 0	0 1	0 0		½ ½	4
10	Sam Shankland (USA)	2645	0 0	0 0	0 0	0 ½	½ 0	0 0	0 ½	½ ½	½ ½		3½

=== Sinquefield Cup ===
The final leg of the Grand Chess Tour was held in Saint Louis, Missouri, United States from 2–11 September 2022.

2022 GCT Sinquefield Cup, 2–11 September Saint Louis, Missouri, United States Category XXI (2766.6)
	Player	Rating	1	2	3	4	5	6	7	8	9	10	Points	TB	TPR	Tour Points	Prize money
1	Alireza Firouzja (FRA)	2778		0	1	½	½	½	1	½	1	–	5	1½	2844	11	$87,500
2	Ian Nepomniachtchi (FIDE)	2792	1		½	½	½	½	1	½	½	~~0~~	5	½	2804	11	$77,500
3	Wesley So (USA)	2771	0	½		1	½	1	½	½	½	–	4½		2799	7.5	$40,000
4	Fabiano Caruana (USA)	2758	½	½	0		½	1	½	1	½	–	4½		2801	7.5	$40,000
5	Leinier Domínguez (USA)	2745	½	½	½	½		½	½	½	½	–	4		2758	6	$26,000
6	Hans Niemann (USA)	2688	½	½	0	0	½		½	½	1	~~1~~	3½		2775	WC (4.5)	$19,750
7	Levon Aronian (USA)	2759	0	0	½	½	½	½		1	½	~~½~~	3½		2727	4.5	$19,750
8	Maxime Vachier-Lagrave (FRA)	2757	½	½	½	0	½	½	0		½	–	3		2665	2.5	$14,500
9	Shakhriyar Mamedyarov (AZE)	2757	0	½	½	½	½	0	½	½		–	3		2665	2.5	$14,500
10	Magnus Carlsen (NOR)	2861	–	~~1~~	–	–	–	~~0~~	~~½~~	–	–		–		2746	–	–

First place playoff
Place	Player	Rapid rating	Rapid		Score
1	Alireza Firouzja (FRA)	2732	½	1	1½
2	Ian Nepomniachtchi (FIDE)	2779	½	0	½

- Magnus Carlsen withdrew from the tournament after Round 3. All his game results got annulled. See Carlsen–Niemann controversy.

== Tour Standings ==
The wildcards (in italics) are not counted in overall standings.

	Player	ROU	POL	CRO	STL	SIN	Total points	Prize money
1	Alireza Firouzja (France)	3.5	—N/a	9	13	11	36.5	$272,250
2	Wesley So (United States)	10	6	6.5	—N/a	7.5	30	$190,167
3	Maxime Vachier-Lagrave (France)	10	—N/a	9	7.5	2.5	29	$165,167
4	Fabiano Caruana (United States)	6	7	—N/a	7.5	7.5	28	$108,833
T-5	Levon Aronian (United States)	10	9	—N/a	3.5	4.5	27	$124,417
T-5	Ian Nepomniachtchi (FIDE)	3.5	—N/a	6.5	6	11	27	$127,250
7	Leinier Domínguez (United States)	6	—N/a	3.5	1	6	16.5	$68,833
8	Shakhriyar Mamedyarov (Azerbaijan)	1.5	—N/a	3.5	5	2.5	12.5	$46,750
9	Richárd Rapport (Hungary) (Note: Rapport had withdrawn from both St. Louis events due to COVID-19 restrictions in the United States and was replaced by Jeffery Xiong and Hans Niemann respectively.)	1.5	5	—N/a	—N/a	—N/a	6.5	$22,750
	Magnus Carlsen (Norway)	—N/a	—N/a	13	—N/a	w/d	13	$40,000
	Jan-Krzysztof Duda (Poland)	—N/a	13	—N/a	—N/a	—N/a	13	$40,000
	Hikaru Nakamura (United States)	—N/a	—N/a	—N/a	10	—N/a	10	$30,000
	Viswanathan Anand (India)	—N/a	9	—N/a	—N/a	—N/a	9	$27,500
	Bogdan-Daniel Deac (Romania)	6	—N/a	—N/a	—N/a	—N/a	6	$26,333
	Jorden van Foreest (Netherlands)	—N/a	—N/a	5	—N/a	—N/a	5	$11,000
	Hans Niemann (United States)	—N/a	—N/a	—N/a	—N/a	4.5	4.5	$19,750
	Radosław Wojtaszek (Poland)	—N/a	4	—N/a	—N/a	—N/a	4	$10,000
	Jeffery Xiong (United States)	—N/a	—N/a	—N/a	3.5	—N/a	3.5	$9,500
	Anton Korobov (Ukraine)	—N/a	3	—N/a	—N/a	—N/a	3	$9,000
	Kirill Shevchenko (Ukraine)	—N/a	2	—N/a	—N/a	—N/a	2	$8,000
	Sam Shankland (United States)	—N/a	—N/a	—N/a	2	—N/a	2	$8,000
	Veselin Topalov (Bulgaria)	—N/a	—N/a	2	—N/a	—N/a	2	$8,000
	IM David Gavrilescu (Romania)	—N/a	1	—N/a	—N/a	—N/a	1	$7,000
	Ivan Šarić (Croatia)	—N/a	—N/a	1	—N/a	—N/a	1	$7,000
