= Budisavljević =

Budisavljević is a Serbian surname. Notable people with the surname include:

- Diana Budisavljević (1891–1978), Austrian humanitarian
- Jovanka Broz (née Budisavljević, 1924–2013), First Lady of Yugoslavia
- Luka Budisavljević (born 2004), Serbian chess grandmaster
- Srđan Budisavljević (1883–1968), Yugoslav politician
