= Onischuk =

Onischuk (Ukrainian: Онищук, Russian: Онищук) is a Ukrainian surname, Lithuanian surname, and Latvian surname.

Notable people with the surname include:

- Alexander Onischuk (born 1975), Ukraine born American chess grandmaster,
- Vladimir Onischuk (born 1991), Ukrainian chess grandmaster.
