= David Gavrilescu =

Romanian chess grandmaster (born 2003)

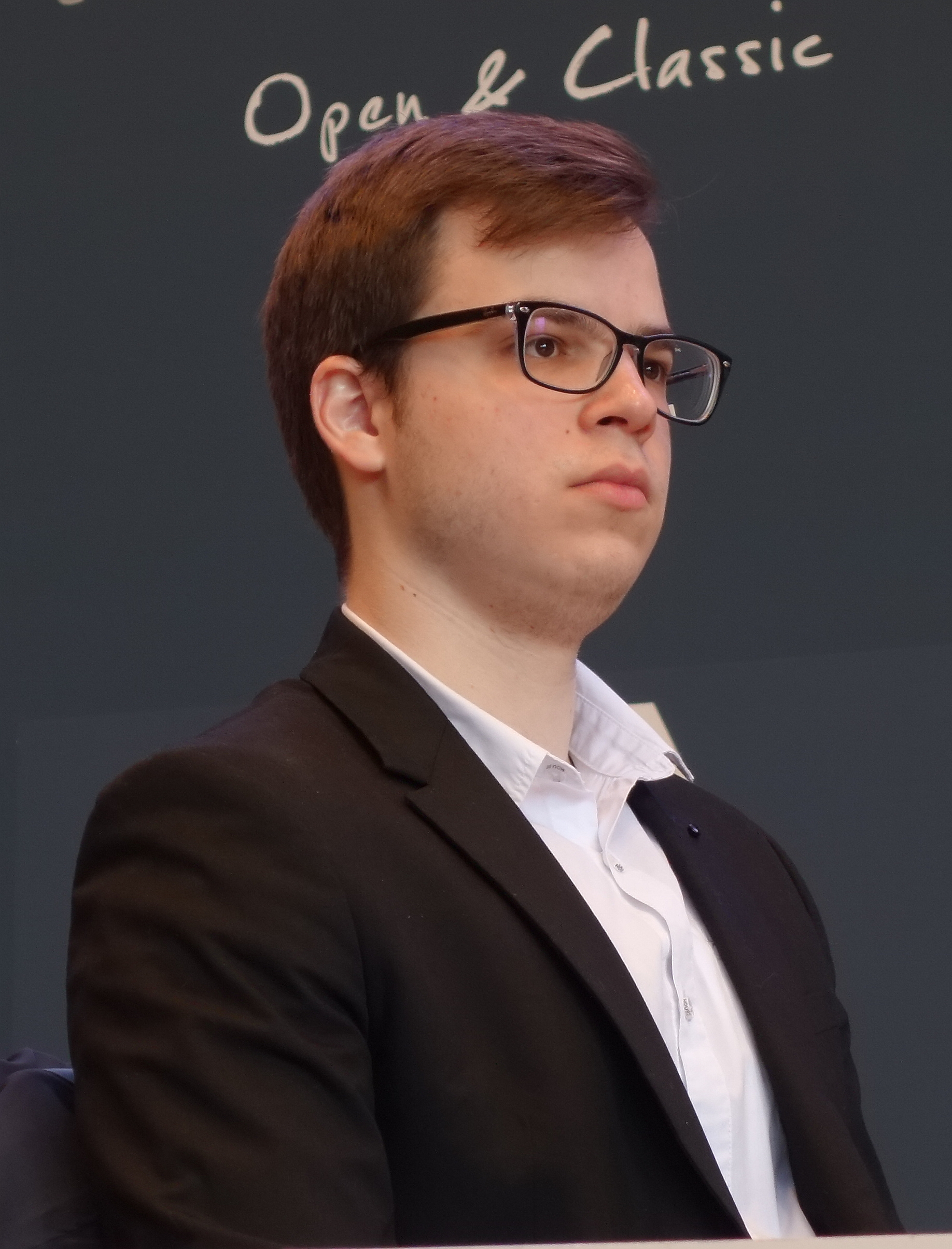
- David Gavrilescu in 2024

Personal information
- Born: March 29, 2003 (age 23) Craiova, Romania

Chess career
- Country: Romania
- Title: Grandmaster (2023)
- FIDE rating: 2527 (September 2026)
- Peak rating: 2560 (June 2025)

David Gavrilescu is a Romanian chess grandmaster.

== Chess career ==
Gavrilescu has been the Romanian national champion several times, and has held other achievements such as U8 European Vice-Champion in 2011, U20 National Junior Champion in 2018, and Balkan Champion in 2020.

In March 2022, Gavrilescu finished tied for second place with Constantin Lupulescu, Tiberiu Georgescu, and Anton Teodor in the Romanian Chess Championship behind winner Mircea Pârligras.

In May 2022, Gavrilescu participated in the Superbet Rapid & Blitz leg of the Grand Chess Tour 2022. He was the lowest-rated player in the field, but managed to hold draws against Wesley So and Radosław Wojtaszek in the rapid portion and score wins against Wojtaszek, Kirill Shevchenko, Viswanathan Anand, and Anton Korobov in the blitz portion.

In February 2023, Gavrilescu finished second in the Romanian Championship, behind Shevchenko.
