= Alireza Firouzja =

Iranian-French chess grandmaster (born 2003)

- Firouzja in 2024

Personal information
- Born: 18 June 2003 (age 23) Babol, Iran

Chess career
- Country: Iran (until 2019); FIDE (2019–2021); France (since 2021)
- Title: Grandmaster (2018)
- FIDE rating: 2757 (November 2026)
- Peak rating: 2804 (December 2021)
- Ranking: No. 10 (November 2026)
- Peak ranking: No. 2 (December 2021)

Alireza Firouzja (Persian: علی‌رضا فیروز‌جا, pronounced [æliːɾeˈzɒː fiːɾuːzˈdʒɒː]; born 18 June 2003) is an Iranian and French chess grandmaster. Firouzja is the youngest player to have surpassed a FIDE rating of 2800, beating the previous record set by Magnus Carlsen by more than five months (192 days).

A chess prodigy, Firouzja won the Iranian Chess Championship at age 12 and earned the Grandmaster title at 14. At age 16, Firouzja became the second-youngest 2700-rated player. In 2021, at age 18, he won the FIDE Grand Swiss tournament and an individual gold medal at the European Team Chess Championship. In 2022, Firouzja won the Grand Chess Tour. He qualified for the Candidates Tournament in 2022 and 2024. In 2026, Firouzja won the Total Chess World Championship Pilot.

Firouzja left the Iranian Chess Federation in 2019 because of the country's longstanding policy against competing with Israeli players. Firouzja played under the FIDE flag until mid-2021, when he became a French citizen and began representing France, where he had already been living. In March 2025, he signed to the Saudi esports organization Team Falcons.

== Early and personal life ==
Firouzja was born on 18 June 2003 in Babol, Iran. He started playing chess at the age of eight. He has an older brother, Mohammadreza (born 1998), who also plays competitive chess.

Firouzja moved to Chartres, France, in 2019 and subsequently obtained French citizenship in July 2021. As of May 2023, Firouzja is studying fashion design in Paris.

== Chess career ==
=== 2015–2017 ===
Firouzja won the gold medal in the U12 section at the Asian Youth Chess Championships held in 2015 in Suwon. In adult tournaments, one of Firouzja's earliest successes was in the 10th Nana Aleksandria Cup in 2015, held in Georgia. In a strong field with 15 grandmasters, Firouzja finished with 5/9, including a victory against grandmaster Vugar Rasulov and four draws against four other grandmasters. He had further successes in the Iranian chess championship semi-final, an unbeaten 7/9 (+5-0=4), which served as a qualifier to the main championship held the following year. He then took part in the strongest open tournament held that year, the Qatar Masters Open 2015, in which he scored 4½/9, including victories against grandmasters Pavel Tregubov and Neelotpal Das.

At the age of twelve, he won the 2016 Iranian Chess Championship, scoring 8/11 points (+5−0=6), a full point ahead of his nearest competitors, and became the youngest ever to win the title.

These results in the Iranian championship semi-finals, the Qatar Masters and the Iranian championship increased Firouzja's rating to 2475 at age 12 years and 7 months.

Later that year, he played in the Asian Nations Cup for Iran in which he scored 5½/7 on board 4 and a notable draw against grandmaster Wei Yi, who was at that time the youngest supergrandmaster in the world. Firouzja then experienced some subpar results.

In August 2016, the Iranian chess federation scheduled a match between 13-year–old Firouzja (2485 FIDE) and then 16-year-old Parham Maghsoodloo (2510 FIDE). Firouzja lost all three games.

Firouzja played in the Stars Cup 2016, an initiative by the Iranian chess federation which pitted the nation's established top players and its new wave of rising stars against some of the strongest grandmasters in the world. Featuring such notable players as Nigel Short, Evgenij Miroshnichenko, Gabriel Sargissian, Aleksey Dreev, Romain Édouard, Ivan Sokolov, Lu Shanglei, and Jaan Ehlvest, it was Firouzja's first major test against such calibre of opposition and he scored 2/10, though he did score a victory over Miroshnichenko. Firouzja also played in his first Olympiad for Iran on the fourth board and finished with 4½/8.

Also in 2016, he was awarded the title International Master (IM) by FIDE.

In February 2017, Firouzja finished in 11th place (6/9) in the Khazar cup, behind the winner, Ferenc Berkes. In April 2017, Firouzja had his best performance to date when he scored 6/9 in the Aeroflot Open 2017, a tournament of about 80 grandmasters, including several players in the top 100. There, he scored victories over German grandmasters Alexander Donchenko, Matthias Blübaum and Falko Bindrich and also beat grandmasters Emilio Córdova and Maxim Vavulin. This result secured Firouzja a grandmaster norm and a TPR of 2746, his highest rating performance until then.

In June 2017, he had a 7/9 performance at the Asian Junior U20 Championship. This result took him over the 2500 rating threshold for the first time. Later that year, the 2nd Stars cup tournament took place in Iran, again with an impressive list of foreign grandmasters: Baadur Jobava, Loek Van Wely, Alexei Shirov, Lázaro Bruzón Batista, Eltaj Safarli and Ivan Sokolov. Firouzja scored 3½/6 (+2-1=3), beating Jobava and Van Wely. His victory over Jobava was particularly notable as it was 13-year–old Firouzja's first victory over a supergrandmaster (Jobava was rated 2714 at the time).

=== 2018 ===
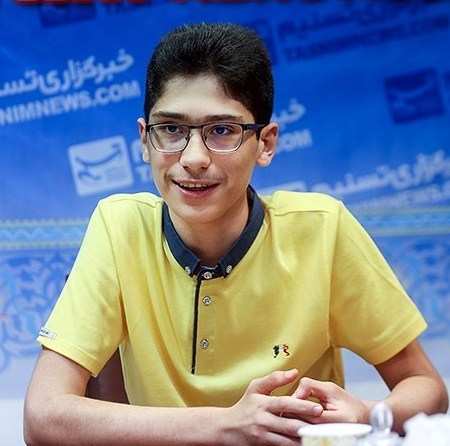
Firouzja in 2018

In January 2018, he had a string of impressive results in the Iranian chess championship semi-final (7½/9) and the World Youth U16 Chess Olympiad (8/9), which increased his rating to 2549.

In February 2018, he participated in the Aeroflot Open. He finished 40th out of 92, scoring 4½/9 points (+2−2=5), earning his final norm required for the title Grandmaster (GM) in the process. He was awarded the GM title by FIDE in April 2018.

Firouzja took part in the 2018 Malaysian Open, tying for second place behind winner Wang Hao. In the same month, he took part in the World Junior Chess Championship held in Gebze, Turkey, finishing on 10th place with score 7½/11.

In July 2018, Firouzja represented Iran at the Asian Nations Cup, held in Hamadan. Iran won all three open events, and Firouzja was the top individual performer in the classical event with 6/7.

At the 2018 43rd Chess Olympiad, he played on the fourth board, scoring 8/11 (+6−1=4).

He won individual gold at the 2018 World Youth U16 Chess Olympiad, with a score of 8/9 (+7−0=2; 2736 performance rating).

At the 2018 World Rapid Championship held in Saint Petersburg, Firouzja finished in sixth place in a field of world-class players, behind Daniil Dubov, Shakhriyar Mamedyarov, Hikaru Nakamura, Vladislav Artemiev and Magnus Carlsen. Starting as the 169th seed in a tournament of 206 participants, Firouzja scored 10/15 (+8−3=4) with a performance rating of 2848, the second-highest in the event, behind winner Dubov. At the World Blitz Championship, he placed 42nd out of 150 with a score of 12/21 (+10−7=4). He led the field by a clear point after 7 rounds with 6½/7, but his form faltered after losing to the eventual winner Carlsen in round 8.

=== 2019 ===
2019 was a significant year for Firouzja as he managed to make a rating leap from 2618 in January to 2723 in December. Firouzja won the Iranian Chess Championship for a second time in 2019, finishing in clear first with 9/11 (+7−0=4).

A string of impressive results would follow. In February, Firouzja took clear 1st place, with 7½/9, in the strong Fajr Cup held in Tehran, Iran, ahead of notable grandmasters such as Pavel Ponkratov, Sergey Volkov, Yuriy Kuzubov, Sergey Fedorchuk, and the best Iranian player of the previous generation, Ehsan Ghaem Maghami. Later that month, he played in his third Stars Cup. This time it had a reduced field of four grandmasters: Safarli, Tiviakov, Bosiocic and Alekseev. It was played in a double round-robin format. Firouzja finished undefeated (+3-0=5).

In March, he competed in the World Team Chess Championship with Iran. He scored 7/9 points (+6−1=2), and Iran placed sixth out of ten. This series of consecutive results increased his rating to 2657 in the April 2019 rating list and he broke into the world top 100.

Later in May, he participated in the 3rd Sharjah Masters. He tied for 1st–7th on 7/9 (+5−0=4), placing fourth on tiebreak. Ernesto Inarkiev won the event. In April, Firouzja competed in the Chess.com Bullet Chess Championship, losing in the quarterfinals to the eventual winner Hikaru Nakamura. Later in April, Firouzja placed second on tiebreak behind Constantin Lupulescu in the Reykjavik Open with 7/9 (+6−1=2). During the event's rest day, he won the European Fischer Random Championship with 8/9 (+7−0=2).

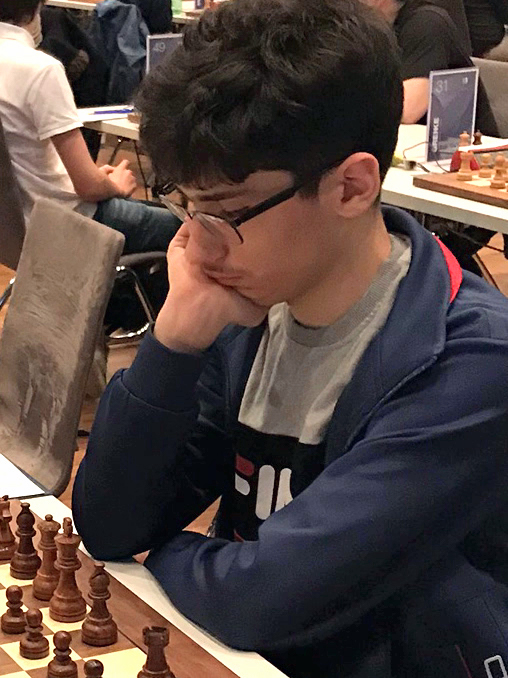
Firouzja the Grenke Chess Open in 2019

Firouzja competed in the Grenke Chess Open, held from 18 to 22 April. He won his first two games but refused to play against the Israeli FIDE Master Or Bronstein in the third round, thus forfeiting the game. This was in line with Iranian government policy, as Iran does not recognise the state of Israel and sanctions players who compete against Israelis. Firouzja then lost in the fourth round to 1945-rated Antonia Ziegenfuss. He won his remaining five games to place 27th with 7/9. In May, Firouzja faced Peruvian grandmaster José Martinez-Alcantara in round one of the 2019 Junior Speed Chess Championship, an online blitz and bullet competition hosted by Chess.com. Firouzja won the match with an overall score of 18–7. Later in May, he competed in the French Rapid and Blitz Championships, held in Le Blanc-Mesnil. He won the rapid event by defeating Alberto David in the final.

In June, Firouzja took part in the 18th edition of the Asian Chess Championship, held from 6 to 16 June in Xingtai. He finished the tournament in sixth place with 6/9 points (+5−2=2). Though only the top five were set to qualify for the Chess World Cup 2019, Firouzja narrowly qualified for a spot in the World Cup as 1st-placed Lê Quang Liêm and 5th-placed Rinat Jumabayev had already qualified in previous events. He later finished fourth in a Blitz event held on the final day of the tournament with 6½/9 pts (+6−2=1).

Firouzja represented Tatvan in the Turkish Super League from 17 to 28 July. He scored 11½/13 (+10–0=3), thus increasing his rating to 2702. This made Firouzja the first Iranian to reach a rating of 2700 or above. It also made him the youngest player in the world rated 2700 or more, and the second youngest player in history (after Wei Yi) to achieve that feat.

At the FIDE World Cup in September, Firouzja defeated Arman Pashikian in round one and Daniil Dubov in round two. This made Firouzja the first Iranian player to reach the third round of a Chess World Cup. In round three, he faced the number-one seed Ding Liren. Firouzja drew with Ding in the two classical games, but lost both of the rapid tiebreakers and was eliminated from the tournament.

On 27 December, Firouzja announced that he would no longer play under the Iran chess federation after Iran withdrew its players from the 2019 World Rapid and Blitz Championship to uphold their ban against Iranians playing against Israelis. He instead competed as a FIDE-licensed competitor. Firouzja competed in the World Rapid Chess Championship from 26 to 28 December. He finished the tournament as runner-up with 10½/15 (+8–2=5), one point short of winner Magnus Carlsen. He was the first-ever Iranian-born grandmaster to go on a podium in the history of the competition. At the World Blitz Chess Championship held from 29 to 30 December, Firouzja placed sixth with 13½/21 (+12–6=3).

=== 2020 ===
Firouzja participated in the Tata Steel Chess Tournament in January. He became the first Iranian to compete in the Masters' bracket of the tournament; Parham Maghsoodloo had previously competed in the 2019 Tata Steel Challengers. This was the first time that Firouzja faced the world elite in a classical round-robin tournament, and he said in an interview that his expectations were not oriented towards winning the event, but gaining more experience at the top level. He finished with 6½/13 (+4–4=5), placing ninth.

In February, Firouzja competed in the Masters section of the Prague International Chess Festival, a 10-player category XIX round-robin event, as a late replacement for Wei Yi, who could not attend due to the COVID-19 pandemic. After a tie for first–fifth on 5/9, Firouzja won the tournament with a 2–0 blitz tiebreak victory over Vidit Gujrathi, giving him his first "supertournament" victory.

On 15 April, Firouzja faced Magnus Carlsen in the final of the Chess24 Banter Blitz Cup and won 8½–7½. Firouzja then competed in the Magnus Carlsen Invitational, a rapid tournament held by Chess24 from 18 April to 3 May, along with Carlsen and six other top players. Carlsen defeated Firouzja in their match by a score of 2½–1½. Firouzja placed sixth overall and did not advance to the four-way playoff.

In October, Firouzja participated in the annual Norway Chess supertournament, in Stavanger. The tournament was held with a football scoring system (3 points for a win, 1 point for a draw and 0 points for a loss). In the case of a draw, players played an armageddon game for an additional 1/2-point. Firouzja finished in second place, behind World Champion Magnus Carlsen and ahead of Levon Aronian, Fabiano Caruana, Jan-Krzysztof Duda and Aryan Tari. By the standard scoring method, Firouzja's score of 4 victories, 1 loss and 5 draws would have been enough to tie for 1st place, but Carlsen's extra points from wins in the armageddon segment relegated Firouzja to second place. His performance rating for the classical games was 2877.

=== 2021 ===
Firouzja participated in the 83rd Tata Steel Masters in January. Going into the final round of the tournament, Firouzja had the chance to tie for first with a win in his final game. However, due to the tournament's tiebreaker rules, he would be unable to compete for first place even if he finished with the same number of points as the tournament's leaders. In his final round matchup against Radosław Wojtaszek, the arbiters suggested mid-game that the two move to a different table, irritating Firouzja. The situation generated controversy and the event organizers ultimately apologized. The game ultimately ended in a draw, and Firouzja placed fifth in the tournament with a score of 8/13 (+4-1=8), level with Andrey Esipenko and Fabiano Caruana on points who finished third and fourth, respectively. He had a 2806 TPR for the event and went up to number 13 in the world rankings.

In June Firouzja participated in the Paris Rapid and Blitz, part of the Grand Chess Tour. He performed poorly in the rapid, scoring 7/18, but scored 11/18 to finish second to Wesley So in the blitz.

Firouzja applied for and obtained French nationality in July 2021.

He was the 8th seed at the Chess World Cup 2021, but was knocked out in the second round by Javokhir Sindarov.

In September, Firouzja finished in second place in the Norway Chess supertournament 2021 edition, behind Magnus Carlsen, but ahead of a field including World Championship challenger Ian Nepomniachtchi and former challenger Sergey Karjakin. He scored +5-2=3 in standard time control games, finishing with four consecutive wins, and moved into the world's top 10 for the first time in the October 2021 rating list (10th in October, 9th in November).

In November Firouzja participated in the 2nd FIDE Grand Swiss Tournament. Firouzja won the tournament with a score of 8/11, half a point ahead of Fabiano Caruana, thus qualifying for the Candidates Tournament 2022. He became the fourth-youngest player to qualify for a Candidates Tournament.

That same month Firouzja represented France in the European Team Chess Championship, where he scored 8/9 against grandmaster opposition for a tournament performance rating of over 3000. The two November results took his rating above 2800 for the first time, and to number 2 in the December standard ratings list. At the age of 18 years, 166 days, he became the youngest player to be rated over 2800, breaking the previous record of 18 years and 336 days held by Magnus Carlsen.

After winning the World Chess Championship 2021, Magnus Carlsen said: "If someone other than Firouzja wins the Candidates Tournament, it is unlikely that I will play the next world championship match."

From 29 to 30 December, Firouzja also participated in the World Blitz Chess Championship, where he tied for first place with Maxime Vachier-Lagrave and Jan-Krzysztof Duda, scoring 15/21 points. He finished in third place after the tiebreaks, won by Vachier-Lagrave.

=== 2022 ===
In May, Firouzja participated in the Superbet Chess Classic held in Bucharest, Romania, the first leg of 2022 Grand Chess Tour. As the top seed going into the event, he finished with a -1 score with 1 win and 2 losses in the 10 player single robin super tournament, tying for 7th place with Ian Nepomniachtchi. He lost the third round to Nepomniachtchi, won the fifth round against Leinier Domínguez and lost the final round to Maxime Vachier-Lagrave, who went on to win the tournament.

From 16 June to 5 July, Firouzja participated in the 2022 Candidates Tournament held in Madrid, Spain, having qualified to play by winning the Grand Swiss in 2021. He finished in sixth place, ending with a 6/14 score, winning against Richárd Rapport in round 9 and Fabiano Caruana in round 14 while losing against Caruana, Hikaru Nakamura and Nepomniachtchi (twice).

From 18 to 24 July, Firouzja participated in the Croatia GCT Rapid & Blitz where he tied 2nd overall – behind Magnus Carlsen – alongside compatriot Maxime Vachier-Lagrave with 22/36 points – earning him $27,500 and 9 GCT points for his second-place finish. Firouzja did not play in the 44th Chess Olympiad in Chennai, along with Vachier-Lagrave and Étienne Bacrot, citing exhaustion and hot weather.

From 15 to 21 August, Firouzja played in the FTX Crypto Cup as part of the Meltwater Champions Chess Tour. He finished with 15/21 points, behind first-place finisher Magnus Carlsen and tying for second alongside Praggnanandhaa on points but placing third due to tiebreak rules. His third-place finish with 15 points earned him $37,500.

From 26 to 30 August, Firouzja participated in the Saint Louis Rapid & Blitz tournament as part of the Grand Chess Tour and won first place with four rounds to spare. Firouzja finished with 26/36 points (11/18 points in the rapid section and 15/18 points in the blitz section), (Note: There were 9 games of rapid chess and 18 games of blitz chess. 2 points are available for each win in a rapid game and 1 point is available for each win in a blitz game) setting the record for the youngest player to win a Grand Chess Tour event and breaking the record for the most dominant win by being 5 points ahead of the field.

On 11 September, Firouzja won the Sinquefield Cup, a 9 (Note: One of the participants, Magnus Carlsen withdrew from the tournament after round 3 which caused all of his games to be annulled.) player round robin tournament, after defeating Ian Nepomniachtchi in a rapid tiebreak match. He finished with a score of 5/8 (+3-1=5) (Note: 3 wins, 1 loss, 5 draws. 3 wins against Levon Aronian, Shakhriyar Mamedyarov and Wesley So and 1 loss against Ian Nepomniachtchi.) and his Sinquefield cup victory in Saint Louis earned him $87,500 alongside his $100,000 bonus for winning the Grand Chess Tour with a 6½ point lead ahead of runner-up, Wesley So. (Note: Firouzja finished with 36½ points, ahead of second place Wesley So on 30 points and third place Maxime Vachier-Lagrave on 29 points.)

On 16 September, Firouzja finished tied first on points, alongside Fabiano Caruana, with 6½/9 in the Champions Showdown:Chess 9LX – a rapid chess 960 tournament. On the verge of scoring a hat-trick in Saint Louis, (Note: Firouzja had already won the Saint Louis Rapid and Blitz, and the Sinquefield Cup in the weeks prior to the start of this tournament. Chess 9LX would have been his third consecutive tournament win in Saint Louis, not counting his victory in the Grand Chess Tour.) Firouzja eventually lost the playoff against Caruana after losing the armageddon game, stumbling into a zugzwang with the black pieces. His second-place finish earned him $31,250.

=== 2023 ===
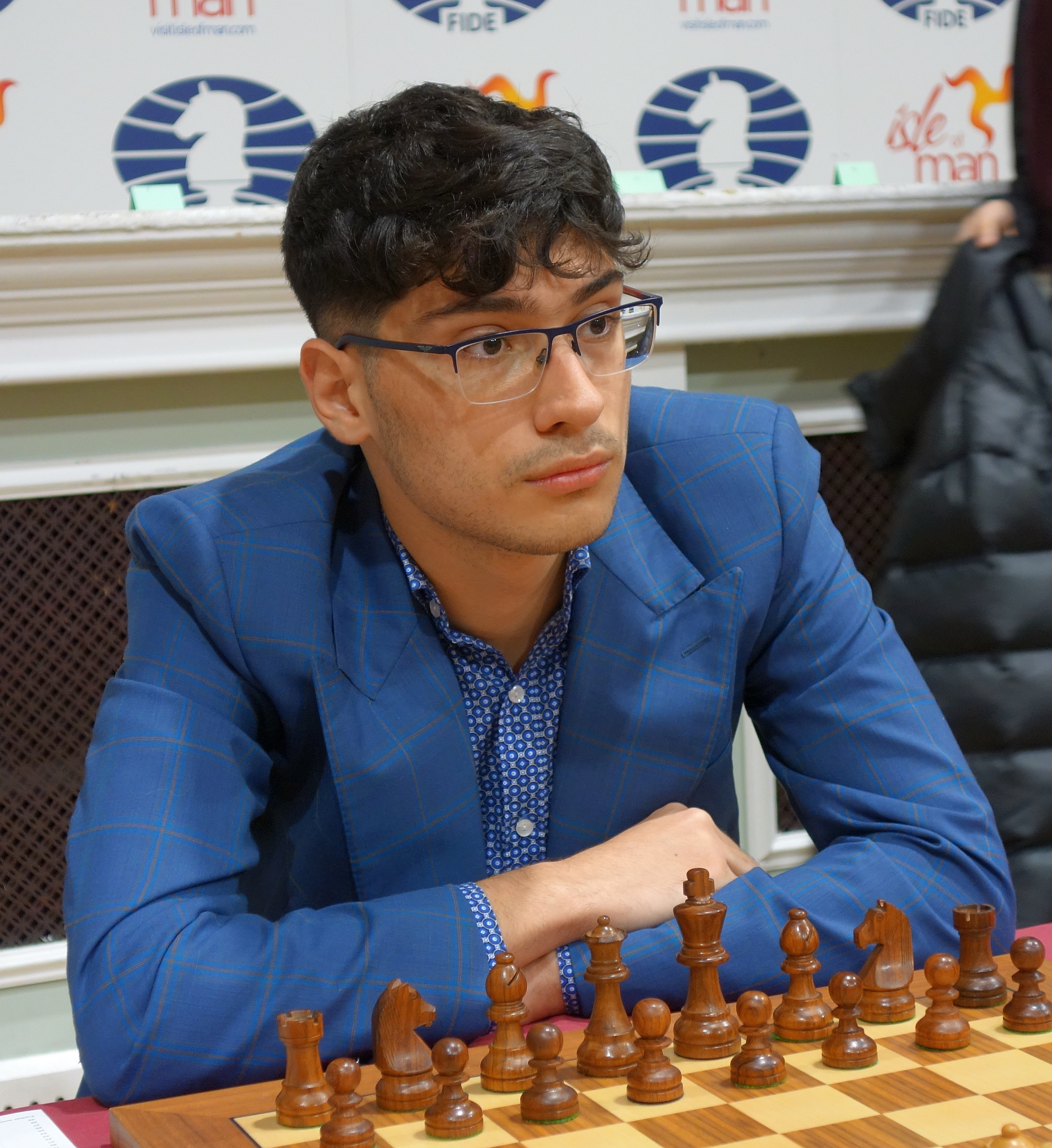
Firouzja in 2023

In May, Firouzja participated in the Superbet Chess Classic in Bucharest, eventually finishing tied for second, ending up with a +1 score, losing two games and winning three, including one over then recently crowned world champion Ding Liren and the runner up in the 2023 World Chess Championship, Ian Nepomniachtchi. On 29 May, Firouzja participated in the Norway Chess Blitz tournament, finishing second behind the Uzbek Nodirbek Abdusattorov. In June, Firouzja participated in the Norway Chess Classical Tournament, losing the first round to Gukesh Dommaraju, but winning the next two rounds against Azerbaijani Shakhriyar Mamedyarov and Abdusattorov.

In December, Firouzja became the subject of controversy after organizing a tournament titled "Alireza Firouzja's Race to Candidates" with several lower rated players (Sergey Fedorchuk, Andrei Shchekachev, and Alexandre Dgebuadze), allegedly with the sole purpose of gaining enough rating points to leapfrog Wesley So for the rating qualification spot for the 2024 Candidates Tournament. Firouzja finished with a score of 5.5/6, failing to surpass So. He later surpassed So after playing in the Open de Rouen, securing his spot in the Candidates with a perfect score of 7/7 and a victory over former FIDE World Championship finalist Gata Kamsky.

=== 2024 ===
Firouzja competed in the Tata Steel Masters in January. He placed fifth with 7½/13 (+5–3=5). At the 2024 Candidates Tournament in April, Firouzja finished in seventh place. He won two games, and lost six. He was the only player to defeat the winner, Gukesh D. On 13 June, Firouzja won the Bullet Chess Championship on Chess.com by defeating American Grandmaster Hikaru Nakamura in the final.

On 16 August, Firouzja won the Saint Louis Rapid & Blitz tournament (12–16 August), taking the lead in the Grand Chess Tour standings from Caruana. On 28 August, he clinched first place in the Sinquefield Cup, which secured him victory of the Grand Chess Tour. In October, Grandmaster Alireza Firouzja's team, Triveni Continental Kings, won the 2024 Tech Mahindra Global Chess League. The team defeated PBG Alaskan Knights 2–0 in the final.

=== 2025 ===
Firouzja started 2025 at the first leg of the Freestyle Chess Grand Slam Tour in Weissenhaus, Germany. He would finish in first place in the group stage before falling in the quarter-finals to local player Vincent Keymer, who would go on to win the tournament. He would then compete in the 2025 Chessable Masters tournament, part of the Champions Chess Tour, having been directly invited to the knockout stage. After being sent to the lower bracket by Hikaru Nakamura, Firouzja was eliminated from the tournament in 5th-6th place after losing to Jan-Krzysztof Duda in the lower bracket.

On 1 March 2025, Firouzja signed with the Saudi esports organization Team Falcons, joining Nakamura. In Superbet Rapid & Blitz Poland, he finished 5th scoring 19.5.

In June, Firouzja defended his Chess.com Bullet Chess Championship, beating Oleksandr Bortnyk in the final.

On 1 August 2025 Firouzja played against Magnus Carlsen in the 2025 Esports World Cup. Firouzja won the first game of the second set, but was defeated in the three subsequent games losing the grand-finals to Carlsen by 0–2.

Firouzja completed 6th in the overall standings of Grand Chess Tour 2025, 6th in Rapid & Blitz Poland, Tied 1-3 (2–3 after blitz tiebreaks) in Superbet Chess Classic Romania (+3-1=5), Tied 4–5 at Rapid & Blitz Croatia, and 9th at The Sinquefield Cup (+1-3=5), failing to qualify for the Finals.

Firouzja competed in the 2025 FIDE Grand Swiss from 2–15 September. Although Firouzja tied with Matthias Blübaum for 2nd place with 7.5/11, he narrowly lost to Blübaum on rating tiebreaks. Firouzja ultimately placed 3rd overall, and missed out on qualification to the 2026 Candidates Tournament, granted to the top 2 finishers.

=== 2026 ===
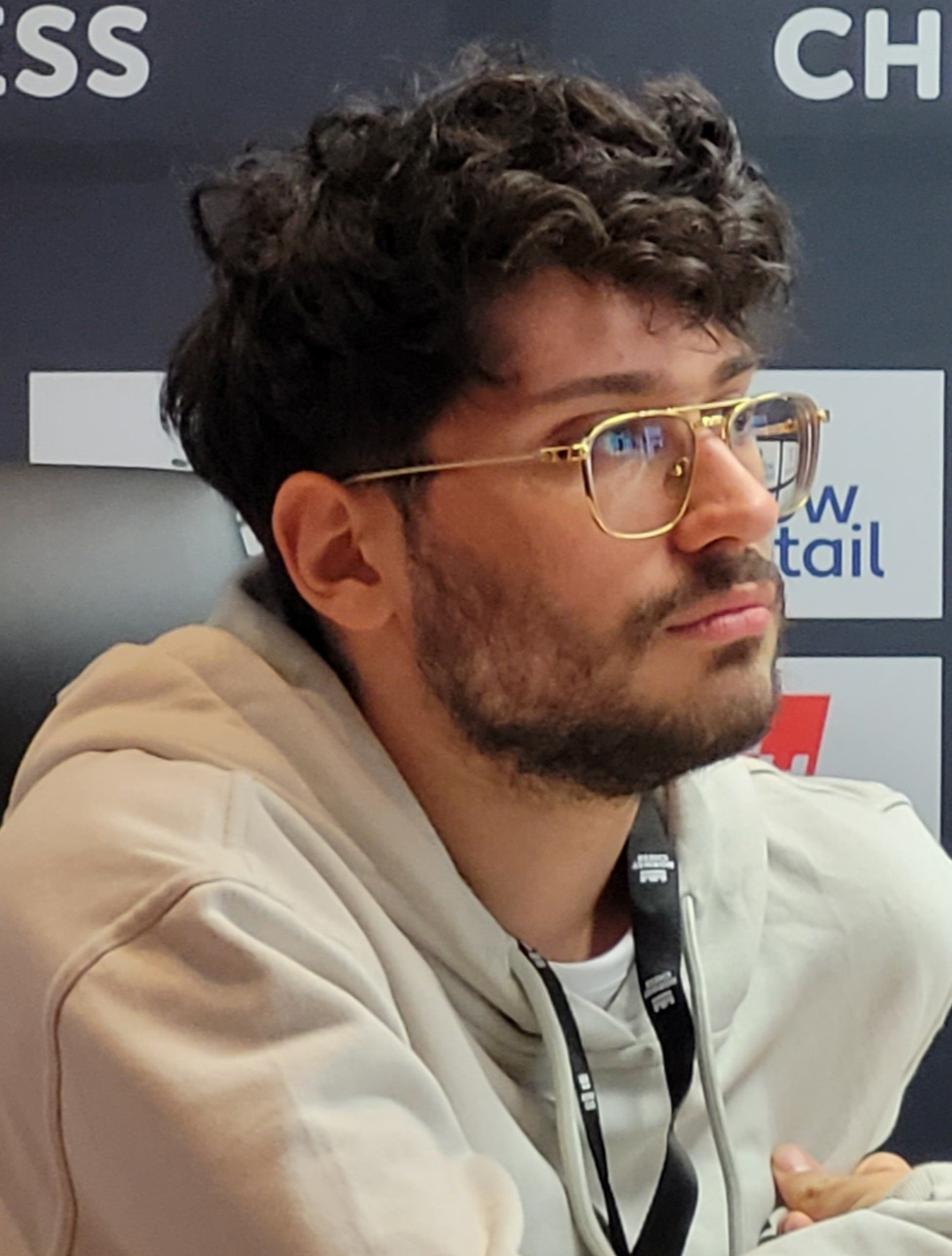
Firouzja at Norway Chess 2026

In May–June, Firouzja participated in Superbet Chess Classic Romania, Where he sustained an ankle injury, he withdrew after round 5. Only a few days later he then participated in Norway Chess. In round 1, he scored his first ever Classical win against Magnus Carlsen, Halfway in the tournament he was leading with a +2 Classical score, but lost successive games to Carlsen and R Praggnanandhaa in round 6 and 7, to finish the tournament in 3rd place. Firouzja was part of the Hexamind Chess team that placed 3rd at the rapid section of World Rapid and Blitz Team Chess Championships 2026.

In July, Firouzja won GCT's Super Rapid & Blitz Croatia, defeating Nodirbek Abdusattorov in Armageddon after they both tied for 23½ points. Continuing his recent triumph, Firouzja won Chennai Grand Masters, with the score of 4½ (+2-0=5), ahead of Dmitry Andreikin and Arjun Erigaisi at 4 points.

On July 27, Firouzja officially withdrew from the Grand Chess Tour in order to participate in the Esports World Cup, which overlapped with the Sinquefield Cup. In August, Alireza finished 4th at the Esports World Cup, after losing in the semifinals to Carlsen and to Hikaru Nakamura in the 3rd place match.

In November, Firouzja won the Total Chess World Championship 2026. He scored 5.5/9 (+4-2=3) in the Blitz Swiss, which served as a tiebreaker for the group stage. Firouzja won Group A with 15 points and qualified to the top knockout bracket. He defeated Fabiano Caruana in their match and went on to face Anish Giri in the final. Their match went down to the armageddon where a draw was agreed in a winning position for Firouzja with the black pieces. As Firouzja had successfully avoided a loss with black he won the tournament.
