= Luka Budisavljević =

Serbian chess grandmaster (born 2004)

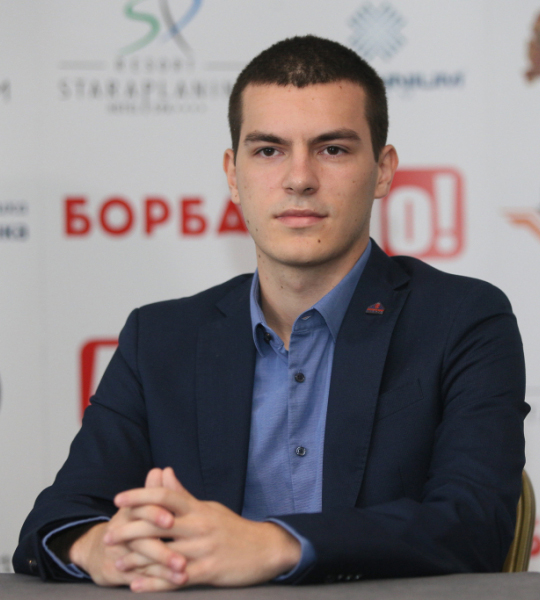

Personal information
- Born: Лука Будисављевић; 22 January 2004 (age 22) Belgrade, Serbia and Montenegro

Chess career
- Country: Serbia
- Title: Grandmaster (2021)
- FIDE rating: 2493 (July 2026)
- Peak rating: 2524 (August 2022)

Luka Budisavljević (Serbian: Лука Будисављевић, born 22 January 2004) is a Serbian chess player. He is the youngest Grandmaster in the history of Serbia. He fulfilled requirements for achieving highest chess title Grandmaster on 29 November 2020 when he was 16 years, 10 months and 7 days old.

== Youth Chess Achievements ==
=== Serbian Cadet Chess Championships 2012–2017 ===
In his first competitive season ever, Budisavljević won the first place at the Cadet Championship of Serbia, both in standard and rapid chess and continued winning Serbian Championships in standard chess for next six years, achieving six times consecutive Serbian Cadet chess champion, as follows:

1. 2012 – first place on "6th Cadet Championship of Serbia" in Vrnjačka Banja, in Under 8 years old group, with 8 out of 9 points.
2. 2013 – first place on "7th Cadet Championship of Serbia" in Vrnjačka Banja, in Under 10 years old group, with 9 out of 9 points.
3. 2014 – first place on "8th Cadet Championship of Serbia" in Subotica, in Under 10 years old group, with 8.5 out of 9 points.
4. 2015 – first place on "9th Cadet Championship of Serbia" in Vrbas, in Under 12 years old group, with 8.5 out of 9 points.
5. 2016 – first place on "10th Cadet Championship of Serbia" in Šumarice, in Under 12 years old group, with 8 out of 9 points.
6. 2017 – first place on "11th Cadet Championship of Serbia" in Šumarice, in Under 14 years old group, with 7.5 out of 9 points.

=== European and World Youth Chess Championships 2012–2017 ===
BEST Results at European Chess Championships

- 2012 – As a representative of Serbia, Luka won first place on "12th European Youth Championship in Rapid chess", held in Banja Vrućica in Bosnia and Herzegovina, in Under 8 year's old group, with 8.5 out of 9 points.
- 2013 – Luka also won 3rd place at "European school chess championship, in standard chess", held in Novi Sad, with 7.5 out of 9 points. For this success FIDE awards international title Candidate Master (CM) to Luka.
- 2015 – Gold medal on European Team Championship in rapid chess, held in Novi Sad, in Under 14 year's old group.

Participation at World and European Youth Chess Championships as invited player ― Champion of Serbia

Year	World Youth Chess Championships held at / location	European Youth Chess Championships held at / location
2012	Maribor, Slovenia	Prague, Czech Republic
2013	Al-Ain, United Arab Emirates	Budva, Montenegro
2014	Durban, Republic of South Africa	Batumi, Georgia
2015	Porto Karas, Greece	Poreč, Croatia
2016	Batumi, Georgia	Prague, Czech Republic
2017	Montevideo, Uruguay	Mamaia, Romania

=== Serbian Junior (Under 20) Chess Championships 2018–2019 ===
- In 2018 while being only 14 year's old Luka won second place at "Juniors Championship of Serbia 2018", in Under 20 year's old group, in Belgrade, and also
- In 2019 while being only 15 year's old Luka shared the first and second place at the "Juniors Championship of Serbia 2019", in Under 20 year's old group, in Aranđelovac, and only by the 4th criteria won the second place.

=== World Youth (Under 16) Chess Olympiads 2018–2019 ===
- In 2018 participated at the "World Youth Under 16 Chess Olympiad 2018" in Konya, Turkey, for Serbian National Chess Team, on the 2nd board.
- In 2019 participated at the "World Youth Under 16 Chess Olympiad 2019" in Çorum, Turkey, for Serbian National Chess Team, on the 1st board.

=== European Youth (Under 18) Chess Championship 2021 in Rapid and Blitz ===
- Silver medal Individual European Youth Rapid Championship Open Under 18, Novi Sad, Serbia.
- Silver medal Team European Youth Rapid Championship Open Under 18, on first board for Serbian Team, Novi Sad, Serbia.
- Bronze medal Individual European Blitz Championship Open Under 18, Novi Sad, Serbia.

== FIDE Titles 2018–2020 ==
=== 2018 – FIDE Master (FM) ===
In January 2018, Luka exceeds 2300 rating points on January FRL and was awarded FIDE Master Title.

=== 2019 – International Master (IM) ===
In 2019 Luka wins 5 (five) IM norms for International Master Title:

- In April — First IM norm at "GM-IM Mix ORBIS 2019" Swiss Tournament in Paraćin.
- In September — Second IM norm at "First Serbian League 2019", in Subotica, playing for Chess club Naftagas Elemir, with 6.5 points from 11 games, scoring two wins, with no defeat. Right after that,
- In September — Third IM norm at "First League of Central Serbia", in Bajina Bašta playing the second board for Chess club Rudar Kostolac, with 7 points out of 11 games with rating performance 2511.
- In October — Fourth IM norm Winning the International Chess Tournament "Tatre Open 2019" in Slovakia, with 7.5 out of 9 points, with rating performance 2529. Right after that,
- In October — Fifth IM norm at the GM-Round Robin "Memorial Momčilo Gvozdenović, Valjevo 2019"

Luka exceeded 2400 rating points in October 2019 FIDE Rating List, fulfilling all requirements for International Master title, which was awarded to him by FIDE in 2020.

=== 2020 – Grandmaster ===
- In February 2020, Budisavljević ranked 5th at the "Semi-final of the Serbian Individual Chess Championship", but due to COVID-19 pandemic all representative, individual and team tournaments were canceled until the second half of 2020.
- In September 2020, at "First Serbian League 2020", while playing on the 1st board for the Chess club Mladost Lučani, with rating performance 2598 (5 points from 10 games), Budisavljević gained 19 new rating points. He won games against three grandmasters over 2550 rating points (namely: GM Sanal Vahap (2581) from Turkey, GM Kadrić Denis (2579) from BIH and GM Meshkovs Nikita (2586) from Latvia), and draw with three grandmasters over 2600 rating points (namely: GM Bernadskiy Vitaliy (2629) from Ukraine, GM Malakhov Vladimir (2669) from Russia and GM Predojević Borki (2601) from BiH).
- At the beginning of October — First GM norm during the "First League of Central Serbia 2020", playing at the 1st board for Chess club Rudar Kostolac (9 points out of 11 games) and gets additional 19 rating points. He won games against four grandmasters: GM Delchev Aleksander (2548) from Bulgaria, GM Dimitrov Radoslav (2507) from Bulgaria, GM Drenchev Petar (2434) form Bulgaria, as well as GM Ivić Velimir (2548) Serbian Grandmaster.
- At the beginning of November — Second GM norm at "TS Mix 144 Novi Sad", Swiss tournament with rating performance 2630, winning new 18 points he exceeds required 2500 rating points;
- At the end of November — Third GM norm was achieved, at the third "TS Mix 155 Novi Sad", Round Robin tournament and

On 29 Nov 2020 Budisavljević fulfilled the requirements for the Grandmaster Title when he was exactly 16 years, 10 months and 7 days old. FIDE approved GM Title at 1st FIDE Council in 2021.

- In December 2020, Budisavljević played at Final of 14th Serbian individual Chess Championship, for the first time and ends up being 8th after beating among others GM Ivan Ivanišević (2608) actual Serbian Champion, who had the highest rating in Serbia at that moment.

At the end of 2020, before his 17th birthday on the rating list of Serbia chess players, Budisavljević was at 11th position with 2510 rating points.

In his age group (chess players born in 2004), Budisavljević holds:

- 5th place in the World,
- 3rd place in Europe and was
- 3rd player at his age who won Grandmaster Title in Europe.

== Grandmaster Chess Career (2021 onward) ==
=== 2021 – Standard chess tournaments ===
- Serbian Individual Chess Championship 2021 - Semifinal, in Paraćin, Serbia.
- 11th Mediterranean Chess Championship, in Petrovac, Montenegro.
- Serbia Chess Open 2021, Masters Tournament, in Belgrade, Serbia.
- International tournament Paracin 2021 Open A, in Paraćin, Serbia.
- Master Tournament (MTO) Biel International Chess Festival 2021, in Biel/Bienne, Switzerland.
- Riga Technical University Open 2021 - Tournament A, in Riga, Latvia.
- European Individual Chess Championship 2021 - Reykjavik Open, in Reykjavík, Iceland.
- Serbian First League 2021, Vrnjačka Banja, Serbia.
- Premier League of Bosnia and Herzegovina, in Neum, Bosnia and Herzegovina.
- Premier League of Belgrade, in Belgrade, Serbia.
- FIDE Grand Swiss 2021, in Riga, Latvia.
- Serbian Individual Championship 2021, in Stara planina, Serbia.

At the end of 2021, before his 18th birthday on the rating list of Serbia chess players, Budisavljević was at 9th position with 2511 rating points, and was one of the most active Serbian chess players with 109 standard chess rated games, on 12 tournaments, during the pandemic 2021 year.

=== 2022 – Standard chess tournaments ===
- Caissa Hotel Chess Tournament - Pirgos Group - A, in Balikesir - Ayvalık, Turkey.
- Caissa Hotel Chess Tournament - Plati Group - A, in Balikesir - Ayvalık, Turkey.
- Serbian Individual Chess Championship 2022 - Semifinal, in Paraćin, Serbia.
- European Individual Chess Championship 2022, in Čatež ob Savi, Slovenia.
- I Open Chess Menorca Grupo A, in Menorca, Spain.
- Swietokrzyskie Chess Festival Zagnansk 2022 - GM RR Tournament, in Zagnańsk, Poland.
