= Norway Chess 2026 =

Chess tournament

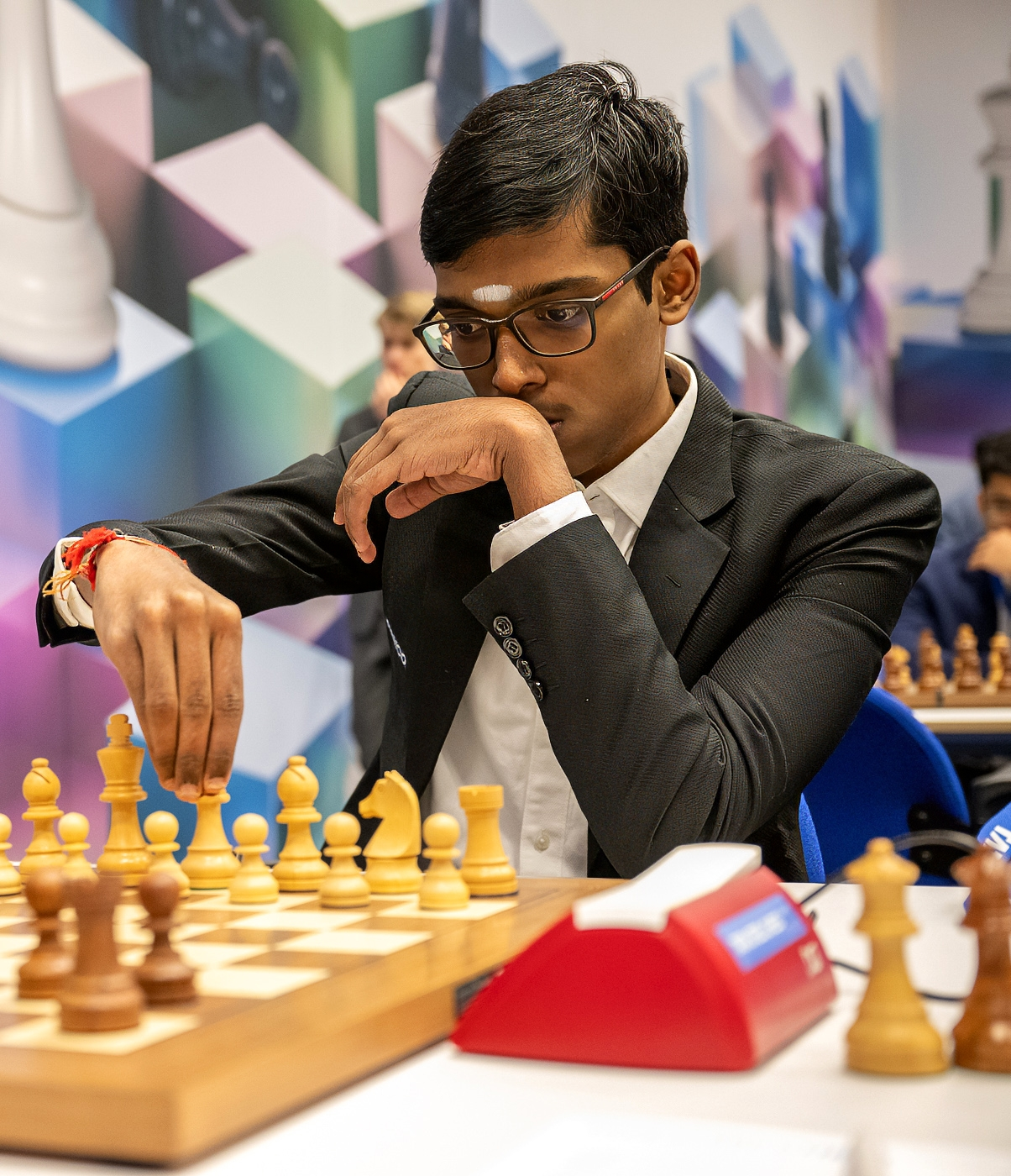
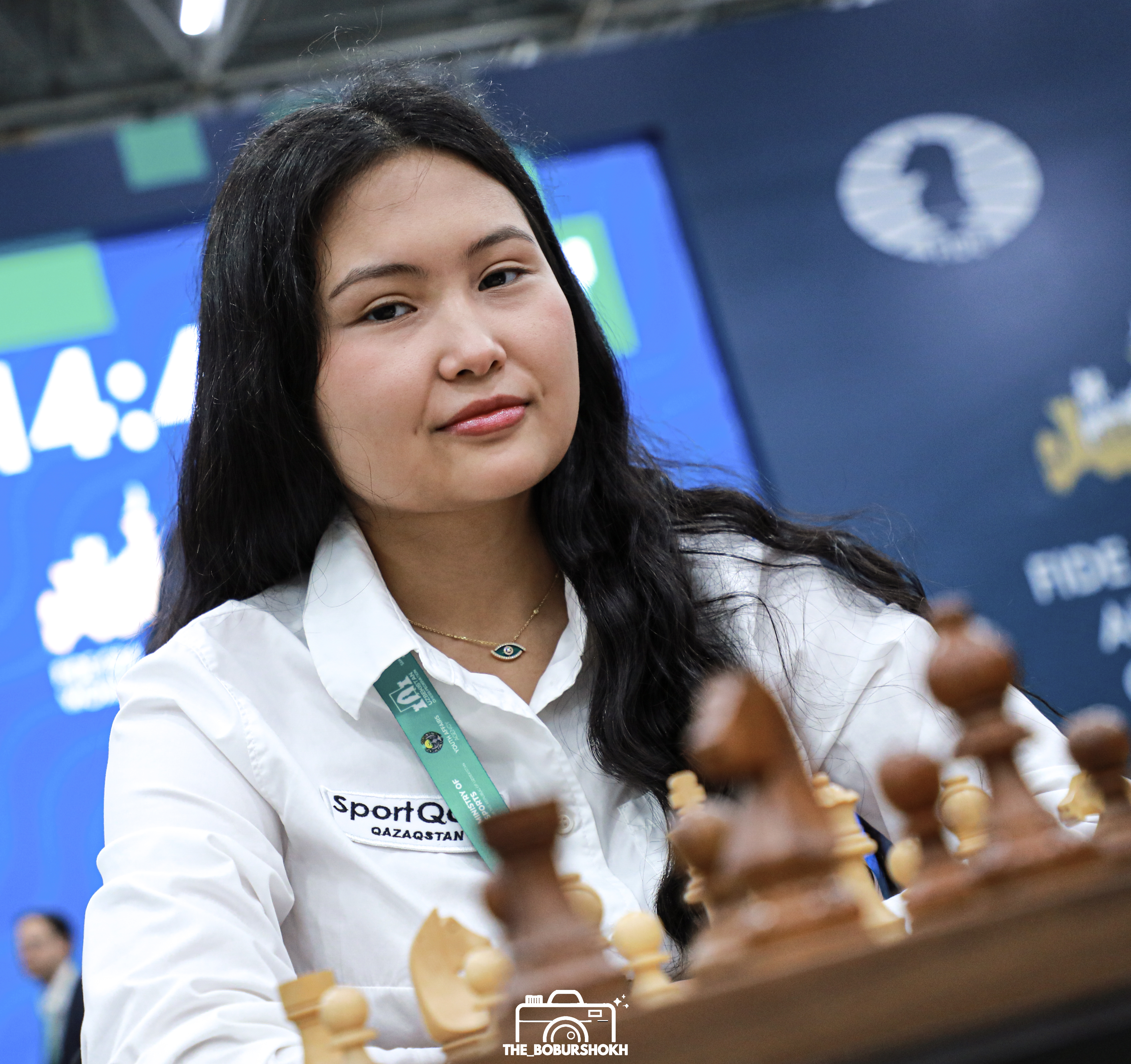
- R Praggnanandhaa (left) and Bibisara Assaubayeva (right)

Tournament information
- Sport: Chess
- Location: Oslo, Norway
- Dates: 25 May–5 June
- Participants: 6 from 5 nations (open); 6 from 4 nations (women)
- Purse: NOK 1,690,000

Final positions
- Champions: R Praggnanandhaa (India) (Open Section); Bibisara Assaubayeva (Kazakhstan) (Women's Section)

Norway Chess 2026 was the 14th edition of the annual chess tournament, held for the first time in Oslo. It was held from 25 May to 5 June 2026. The field of six players featured world number one Magnus Carlsen, world champion Gukesh Dommaraju, Vincent Keymer, Alireza Firouzja, Wesley So and R Praggnanandhaa. The third edition of the Norway Chess Women was also held simultaneously, featuring women's world champion Ju Wenjun. Carlsen and Anna Muzychuk were the defending champions.

The Open Section was won by R Praggnanandhaa. Bibisara Assaubayeva won the women's section with a round to spare.

== Organization ==
Like in previous editions, Norway Chess 2026 featured a unique system wherein players played an armageddon game in case the classical game was drawn.

The time control for the classical games was 120 minutes for the entire game, with an increment of 10 seconds starting from move 41. For the armageddon games, white got 10 minutes while black gets 7 minutes but had draw odds. Players got 3 points for a classical win, 1½ points for an armageddon win, 1 point for an armageddon loss and 0 points for a classical loss.

== Participants ==
=== Open ===
| Player | Rating | Ranking |
| Player | May 2026 | |
|---|---|---|
| (Norway) Magnus Carlsen | 2840 | 1 |
| (Germany) Vincent Keymer | 2759 | 7 |
| (France) Alireza Firouzja | 2759 | 8 |
| (United States) Wesley So | 2754 | 9 |
| (India) R Praggnanandhaa | 2733 | 17 |
| (India) Gukesh Dommaraju | 2732 | 19 |

=== Women ===
| Player | Rating | Ranking |
| Player | May 2026 | |
|---|---|---|
| (China) Ju Wenjun | 2559 | 3 |
| (China) Zhu Jiner | 2546 | 4 |
| (India) Humpy Koneru | 2535 | 6 |
| (Kazakhstan) Bibisara Assaubayeva | 2527 | 7 |
| (Ukraine) Anna Muzychuk | 2522 | 8 |
| (India) Divya Deshmukh | 2500 | 12 |

== Standings ==
=== Open Section ===
14th Norway Chess, 25 May – 5 June 2026, Oslo, Norway, Category XXI (2762.8)
| | Player | Rating | 1 | 2 | 3 | 4 | 5 | 6 | Points |
|---|---|---|---|---|---|---|---|---|---|
| 1 | R Praggnanandhaa (India) | 2733 | | 1½ 0 | 3 0 | 3 3 | 3 1½ | 0 3 | 18 |
| 2 | Wesley So (United States) | 2754 | 3 1 | | 1½ 1½ | 1½ 3 | 1½ 1½ | 1½ 1 | 17 |
| 3 | Alireza Firouzja (France) | 2759 | 3 0 | 1 1 | | 3 0 | 1½ 1½ | 3 1½ | 15½ |
| 4 | Magnus Carlsen (Norway) | 2840 | 0 0 | 0 1 | 3 0 | | 1½ 1½ | 3 3 | 13 |
| 5 | Vincent Keymer (Germany) | 2759 | 1 0 | 1 1 | 1 1 | 1 1 | | 3 1 | 11 |
| 6 | Gukesh Dommaraju (India) | 2732 | 0 3 | 1½ 1 | 1 0 | 0 0 | 1½ 0 | | 8 |

=== Women's Section ===
3rd Norway Chess Women, 25 May – 5 June 2026, Oslo, Norway, Category XII (2531.5)
| | Player | Rating | 1 | 2 | 3 | 4 | 5 | 6 | Points |
|---|---|---|---|---|---|---|---|---|---|
| 1 | Bibisara Assaubayeva (Kazakhstan) | 2527 | | 3 1½ | 1 1 | 1½ 0 | 1 3 | 1½ 3 | 16½ |
| 2 | Zhu Jiner (China) | 2546 | 1 0 | | 1½ 1½ | 3 1½ | 0 3 | 3 1½ | 16 |
| 3 | Anna Muzychuk (Ukraine) | 2522 | 1½ 1½ | 1 1 | | 1½ 1½ | 3 1½ | 1 1½ | 15 |
| 4 | Ju Wenjun (China) | 2559 | 3 1 | 1 0 | 1 1 | | 1 3 | 1 1½ | 13½ |
| 5 | Divya Deshmukh (India) | 2500 | 0 1½ | 0 3 | 1 0 | 0 1½ | | 1½ 1½ | 10 |
| 6 | Koneru Humpy (India) | 2535 | 0 1 | 1 0 | 1 1½ | 1 1½ | 1 1 | | 9 |

== Summary ==
The tournament is notable for both Carlsen's and Gukesh's relative underperformances. For the first time in three years, Carlsen finished a classical tournament with more losses than wins, costing him 18 rating points and putting him at his lowest rating since 2017. Gukesh finished in last place, becoming his lowest classical round-robin performance since becoming World Champion. Also notable is the quick recovery of Alireza Firouzja, who, due to a foot injury, had to withdraw from GCT Romania only days before Norway. Despite this, Alireza won his first two games, and finished the tournament in 3rd. After 6 rounds, Praggnanandhaa was on 6th place, 5½ points behind 1st place Wesley So but made an "impossible" comeback with 4 consecutive Classical wins.
