= Petar Drenchev =

Bulgarian chess grandmaster (born 1977)

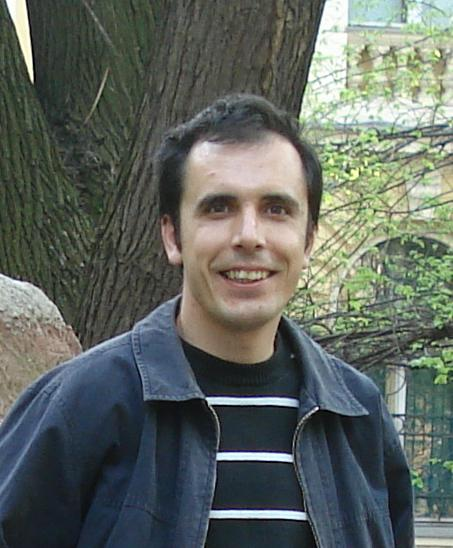
- Drenchev in 2011

Personal information
- Born: Petar Nikolov Drenchev; 25 April 1977 (age 49) Kazanlak, Bulgaria

Chess career
- Country: Bulgaria
- Title: Grandmaster (2011)
- Peak rating: 2527 (September 2014)

Petar Nikolov Drenchev (Bulgarian: Петър Николов Дренчев; born 25 April 1977) is a Bulgarian chess player who received the FIDE title of Grandmaster (GM) in 2011. He is a professional chess player, who graduated from the National Sports Academy as a chess coach.
