= Maxim Vavulin =

Russian chess grandmaster (born 1998)

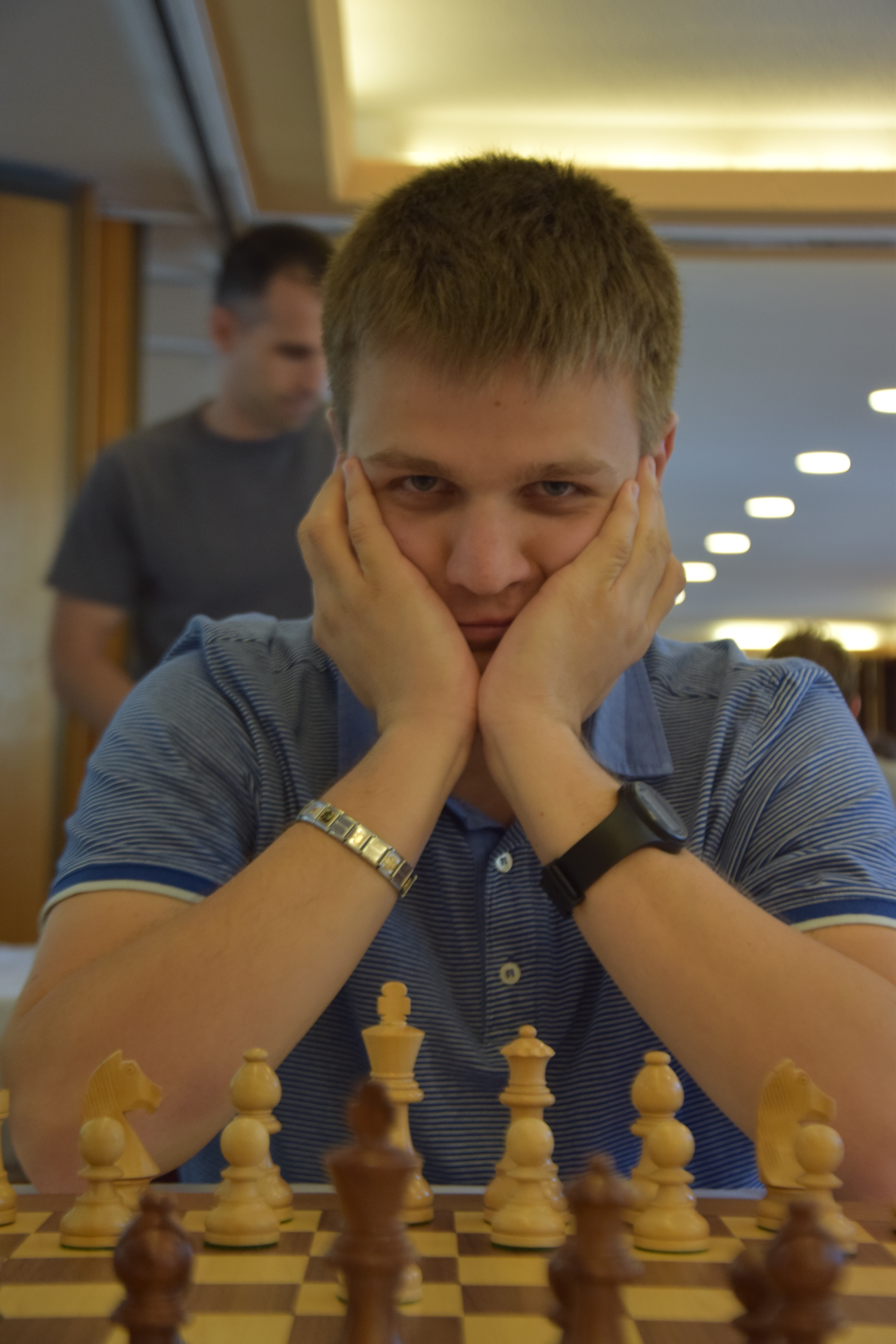
- Vavulin at the 2019 Andorra open

Personal information
- Born: 6 May 1998 (age 28) Moscow, Russia

Chess career
- Country: Russia (until 2022); FIDE (2022–2024); Germany (since 2024)
- Title: Grandmaster (2018)
- FIDE rating: 2537 (July 2026)
- Peak rating: 2604 (January 2017)

Maxim Vavulin (Russian: Максим Вавулин; born 6 May 1998) is a Russian chess grandmaster.

== Chess career ==
Born in Moscow in 1998, Vavulin earned his international master title in 2013 and his grandmaster title in 2018. He won the European Individual Rapid Chess Championship in 2017.
