= Kirill Shevchenko =

Ukrainian-Romanian chess player (born 2002)

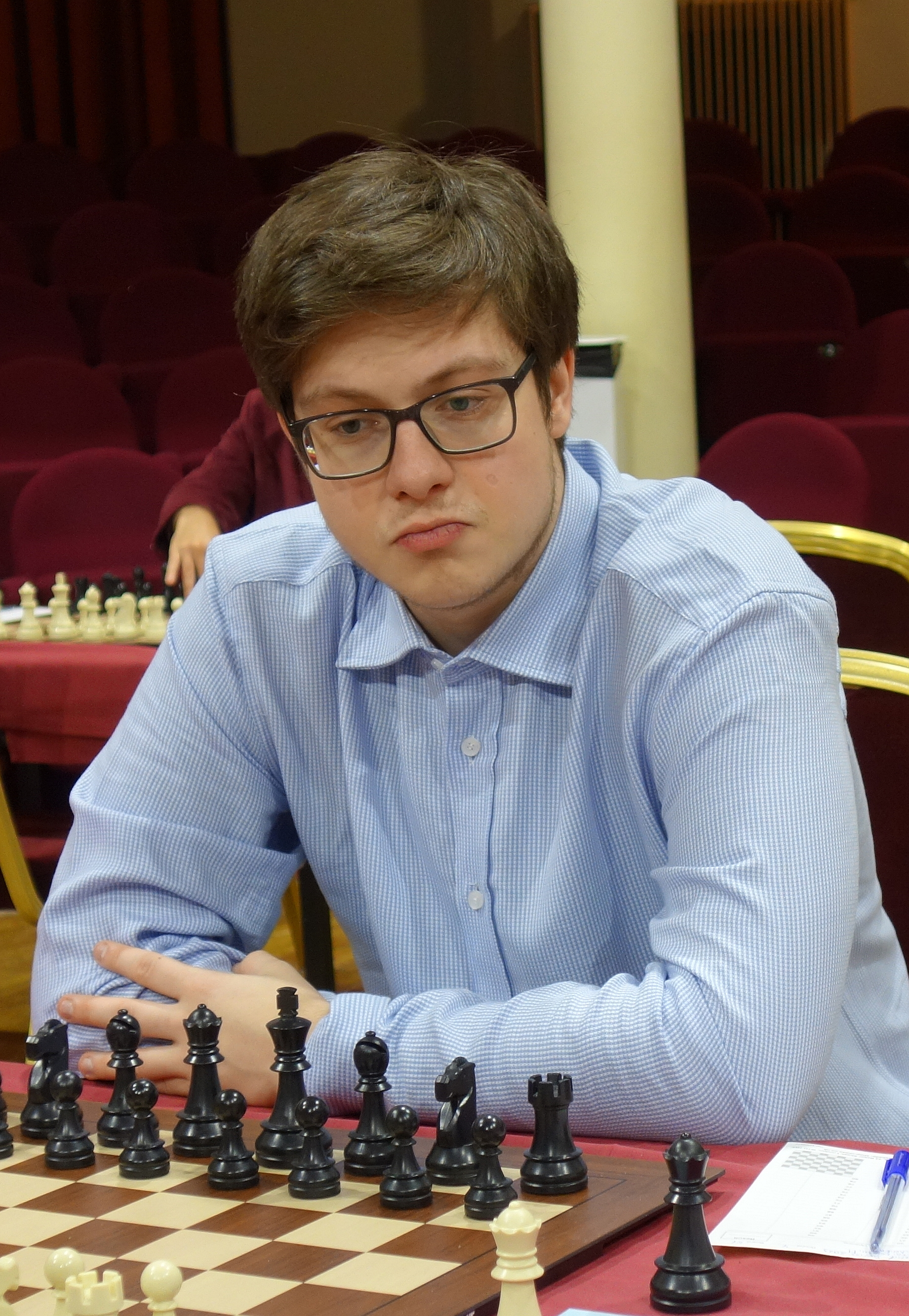
- Shevchenko in 2023

Personal information
- Born: 22 September 2002 (age 24) Kyiv, Ukraine

Chess career
- Country: Ukraine (until 2023); Romania (since 2023)
- Title: Grandmaster (2017, revoked on August 26, 2025); International Master (2016)
- Peak rating: 2694 (June 2023)
- Peak ranking: No. 39 (June 2023)

Kirill Serhiyovych Shevchenko (Ukrainian: Кірілл Сергійович Шевченко; born 22 September 2002) is a Ukrainian chess player who later played for Romania. He was awarded the title International Master in 2016. He was also awarded the title Grandmaster in 2017, but it was revoked on August 26, 2025 for cheating by using a smartphone that was hidden in a bathroom. He has also been banned by FIDE from all FIDE events for three years, which ended in October 2026.

== Chess career ==
Born in 2002, Shevchenko earned his international master title in 2016 and his grandmaster title in 2017, at the age of 14 years 10 months. His grandmaster title was revoked on August 26, 2025 for cheating.

In February 2018, he competed in the Aeroflot Open and finished 51 out of 92, scoring 4½/9 (+2–2=5). In March 2018, he competed in the European Individual Chess Championship and placed 32nd, scoring 7½/11 (+6–2=3).

In November 2021, Shevchenko won the Lindores Abbey Blitz tournament in Riga, Latvia. He finished clear first on 14/18, half a point ahead of Fabiano Caruana and Arjun Erigaisi. Later in the month, he represented Ukraine at the European Team Chess Championship. He played on board 4, scoring 4½/8 (+1–0=7), as Ukraine won gold.

== Controversies ==
On 14 October 2024, he was expelled from the Spanish Team Championship after being accused of cheating by using his mobile device in his games against Bassem Amin and Francisco Vallejo Pons. His draw against Amin and win against Vallejo Pons were both changed to losses. Following the incident, Shevchenko was suspended by FIDE for 75 days, ending one day after the World Blitz Championship.

In December 2024, Shevchenko's Chess.com account was banned for violating the website's Fair Play Policy.

In March 2025, Shevchenko was given a three-year suspension relating to his October 2024 cheating incident, with one year suspended, making him eligible to play again after 18 October 2026. This makes him the highest-rated player to have been suspended for cheating.

On August 26, 2025, FIDE revoked his Grandmaster title, and banned him until October 2026 from all FIDE events.
