= Volodymyr Onyshchuk =

Ukrainian chess grandmaster (born 1991)

Personal information
- Born: 21 July 1991 (age 34) Ivano-Frankivsk, Ukraine

Chess career
- Country: Ukraine
- Title: Grandmaster (2012)
- FIDE rating: 2617 (July 2026)
- Peak rating: 2669 (May 2015)
- Peak ranking: No. 71 (May 2015)

Volodymyr Volodymyrovich Onyshchuk (Ukrainian: Володимир Володимирович Онищук; born 21 July 1991) is a Ukrainian chess grandmaster.

== Chess career ==
Born in 1991, Onyshchuk was awarded the International Master (IM) title in 2005 and received the Grandmaster (GM) title the seven years later.

Onyshchuk represented Ukraine at the European Youth Chess Championships and World Youth Chess Championships. He won three medals: gold in 2001 in Kallithea in European Youth Chess Championship in U10 age group and two silvers in 2003 in Budva in European Youth Chess Championship in U12 age group and in 2006 in Batumi World Youth Chess Championship in U16 age group. In 2006 in Kyiv Onyshchuk won the Nabokov Chess Memorial and won the World Youth U16 Chess Olympiad with Ukraine in Ağrı.

In 2007, he won a chess tournament in Kharkiv. In 2008, he shared first place in Warsaw in the Najdorf Memorial. In 2015 Onyshchuk shared first place with Li Chao in Cappelle-la-Grande Open and won the Metz Open.

In August 2017 Onyshchuk won the RTU Open "A" tournament in Riga.

In 2022 he participated in the 44th Chess Olympiad and received an individual bronze medal for his performance at the reserve board.
