= Ding Liren =

Chinese chess grandmaster (born 1992)

- Ding at the 2026 Chess Olympiad

Personal information
- Born: 24 October 1992 (age 33) Wenzhou, Zhejiang, China
- Education: Peking University

Chess career
- Country: China
- Title: Grandmaster (2009)
- World Champion: 2023–2024
- FIDE rating: 2723 (October 2026)
- Peak rating: 2816 (November 2018)
- Ranking: No. 20 (October 2026)
- Peak ranking: No. 2 (November 2021)

Chinese name
- Chinese: 丁立人
Transcriptions
Standard Mandarin
- Hanyu Pinyin: Dīng Lìrén
- IPA: [tíŋ lîɻə̌n]
Wu
- Romanization: Tin^{1} Liq^{5} nyin^{3}

Ding Liren (Note: Chinese: 丁立人; pinyin: Dīng Lìrén.) (born 24 October 1992) is a Chinese chess grandmaster who was the 17th World Chess Champion from 2023–24. He is a three-time Chinese Chess Champion and was part of the Chinese teams that won the Chess Olympiads in 2014 and 2018. Ding is the first Chinese player ever to play in a Candidates Tournament and the only Chinese player to pass the 2800 Elo mark on the FIDE world rankings. In July 2016, with a blitz rating of 2875, he was the highest-rated Blitz player in the world. In July 2023, Ding became the No. 1 ranked Rapid player, with a rating of 2830. He achieved his highest classical rating of 2816 in November 2018 and a peak classical ranking of No. 2 in November 2021 behind Magnus Carlsen.

Ding was undefeated in classical chess from August 2017 to November 2018, recording 29 victories and 71 draws. This 100-game unbeaten streak was the longest in top-level chess history, until Magnus Carlsen surpassed it in 2019. Ding ended up being the runner-up of Chess World Cups in 2017 and 2019 consecutively and came second in the Candidates Tournament in 2022: this qualified him for the World Chess Championship 2023 against Ian Nepomniachtchi, as Carlsen declined to defend his title. Ding won, becoming World Chess Champion, by defeating Nepomniachtchi 2½ to 1½ in the rapid tie breaks after their classical match ended in a 7–7 tie. He lost his title to Gukesh Dommaraju in the last game of the World Chess Championship 2024, reaching a score of 6½ to 7½.

== Early life and education ==
Ding was born in Wenzhou, China, and started learning chess when he was four years old. He attended Wenzhou Zhouyuan Elementary School, and is a graduate of Zhejiang Wenzhou High School and Peking University Law School.

== Chess career ==
Ding is a three-time Chinese Chess Champion (2009, 2011, 2012).

=== 2012–2016 ===
In September 2012, Ding represented China as board three at the 40th Chess Olympiad at Istanbul, where he finished with a score of 7½/10 (+6−1=3) with a performance rating of 2764.

In August 2014, Ding played as board two for the gold medal-winning Chinese team at the 41st Chess Olympiad at Tromsø. He finished with a score of 7½/10 (+5−0=5) and a performance rating of 2831, enough to win an individual bronze medal.

In April 2015, Ding won team gold and individual silver at the World Team Championships. Four months later, in August, he became the first Chinese player after Wang Yue to break into the top 10 of the FIDE world rankings. In September, Ding participated in the Chess World Cup 2015, where he was eliminated by Wei Yi in the fourth round.

In July 2016, with a Blitz rating of 2875, Ding was the highest-rated Blitz player in the world. In September, Ding represented China as board two at the 42nd Chess Olympiad at Baku, where he finished with a score of 7½/10 (+5−0=5) with a performance rating of 2775.

=== 2017–2019 ===
In the Chess World Cup 2017, Ding reached the finals by winning his matches against Mohamed Haddouche, Martyn Kravtsiv, Vidit Gujrathi, Wang Hao, Richárd Rapport, and Wesley So (in tie-breaks). After drawing all four classical games, he lost in rapid tie-breaks to Levon Aronian. In coming second, Ding became the first-ever Chinese player to qualify for a Candidates Tournament, the penultimate stage in the World Championship.

At the Candidates Tournament 2018, Ding placed 4th with 1 win and 13 draws, the only candidate without a loss at the event. In September, Ding became the first Chinese player to pass the 2800 Elo mark on the FIDE world rankings, and in November he reached a rating of 2816, the joint-tenth highest rating in history. This brought him to ranked 4th in the world for that month. In October, Ding played as board one for the gold medal-winning Chinese team at the 43rd Chess Olympiad at Batumi. He finished with a score of 5½/8 (+3−0=5) and a performance rating of 2873, which earned him an individual gold medal.

From August 2017 to November 2018, Ding had a 100-game unbeaten streak, recording 29 wins and 71 draws during that time. His streak was ended by Maxime Vachier-Lagrave in the 7th round of the 2018 Shenzhen Masters. His streak was eventually passed by Magnus Carlsen who recorded a 125-game unbeaten streak.

In August 2019, Ding tied first in the Sinquefield Cup with a score of 6½/11 (+2−0=9) with a performance rating of 2845. He won the tournament after beating Magnus Carlsen in the playoffs, drawing both games in the rapid portion and winning 2–0 in the blitz portion.

In October, at the Chess World Cup 2019, Ding once again advanced to the finals, before ultimately losing to Teimour Radjabov after drawing the classical games (+1−1=2), the rapid tiebreaks (+0−0=4), and losing 2–0 in the blitz tiebreaks. By finishing second place in the World Cup for the second time in a row, he qualified for the 2020–21 Candidates Tournament.

Along with Magnus Carlsen, Maxime Vachier-Lagrave, and Levon Aronian, he was a 2019 Grand Chess Tour finalist. Ding went on to win the Grand Chess Tour final, beating Aronian in the semi-finals and Vachier-Lagrave in the finals.

=== 2020–2023 ===
In March 2020, Ding played in the 2020–2021 Candidates Tournament. At the start of the tournament, he won one game, lost three, and drew three in the first half of the tournament before it was suspended. He finished in 5th place after the tournament was resumed in April 2021, with a score of 7/14 (+4–4=6) and a performance rating of 2768. During 2022, Ding was able to play three of the nine tournaments of the Champions Chess Tour 2022 winning the Chessable Masters where he beat Magnus Carlsen in semi-finals.

After Sergey Karjakin was disqualified from the Candidates Tournament 2022, Ding was the highest player on the ratings list who was not already qualified. Ding had been unable to travel to tournaments outside China during the COVID-19 pandemic, and was thus short of the minimum games requirement for qualification, but the Chinese Chess Association organized three different rated events at short notice to allow him to qualify. At the Candidates Tournament, Ding recovered from a slow start and finished with 8/14 (+4−2=8), achieving second place at the tournament's end on 5 July. Later the same month the reigning World Champion Magnus Carlsen declined to defend his title against the Candidates winner, Ian Nepomniachtchi. Therefore, Ding's second-place spot qualified him to play Nepomniachtchi in the World Chess Championship 2023.

In January 2023, Ding appeared at the Tata Steel tournament, defeating Gukesh D in the first round, but later losing to R Praggnanandhaa, Richárd Rapport, and Anish Giri, finishing in 11th place with 5½/13 (+1−3=10). This result dropped his rating below 2800, leaving only Magnus Carlsen to retain a rating above 2800.

=== World Champion (2023–2024) ===
World Chess Championship 2023
| | Rating | Match Games (Classical) | | | | | | | | | | | | | | Tiebreak (Rapid) | | | | Score |
| | Rating | 1 | 2 | 3 | 4 | 5 | 6 | 7 | 8 | 9 | 10 | 11 | 12 | 13 | 14 | 15 | 16 | 17 | 18 | Score |
|---|---|---|---|---|---|---|---|---|---|---|---|---|---|---|---|---|---|---|---|---|
| Ian Nepomniachtchi (FIDE) | 2795 (#2) | ½ | 1 | ½ | 0 | 1 | 0 | 1 | ½ | ½ | ½ | ½ | 0 | ½ | ½ | ½ | ½ | ½ | 0 | 7 (1.5) |
| Ding Liren (CHN) | 2788 (#3) | ½ | 0 | ½ | 1 | 0 | 1 | 0 | ½ | ½ | ½ | ½ | 1 | ½ | ½ | ½ | ½ | ½ | 1 | 7 (2.5) |

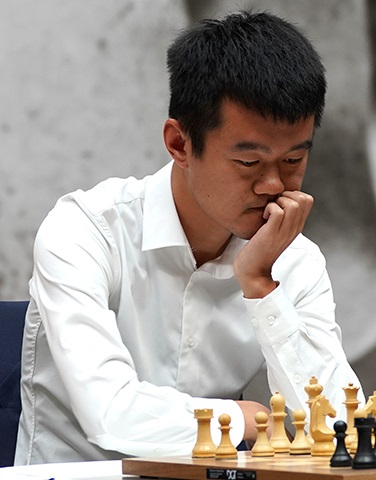
Ding Liren plays in Round 12 of the World Chess Championship 2023

In April 2023, Ding and Nepomniachtchi began the World Championship match with a back-and-forth classical portion that ended tied 7–7. Ding then defeated Nepomniachtchi in rapid tiebreaks, winning the fourth game as Black. Ding became the first Chinese player to hold the title of World Chess Champion. In May, Ding participated in the GCT Superbet Chess Classic Romania, finishing in 8th with a score of 4/9 (+1−2=6). Following this, Ding took a nine-month break from tournaments, citing a struggle with depression.

Ding ended the break in January 2024, placing ninth at the Tata Steel Chess Tournament 2024 with a score of 6/13 (+2−3=8). In March, Ding played in the rapid time control (45+10) Grenke Chess Classic. He finished in 5th place out of 6 players, after scoring 4/10 (+0−2=8) in the double round-robin, coming second in a 4th-place tiebreaker with Vincent Keymer and Daniel Fridman (+1−2=1), and then beating Fridman 1½–½ for 5th place. In May–June, Ding played in Norway Chess, placing last out of 6 players with a score of 7/30. The tournament was a double round-robin in classical chess, with an Armageddon playoff after each classical draw. A classical win counted for three points, a classical draw and Armageddon win counted for one-and-a-half points, a classical draw and Armageddon loss counted for one point, and a classical loss counted for zero points. Ding scored no wins, four losses, and six draws in the classical games. He won 2 out of 6 Armageddon games, against R Praggnanandhaa and Hikaru Nakamura. In September, representing China as board one at the 45th Chess Olympiad in Budapest, Ding failed to win a single game and as a result fell out of the FIDE top 20 rankings. He finished with a score of 3½/8 (+0−1=7) and a rating performance of 2664.

World Chess Championship 2024
| | Rating | Rank | Match Games | | | | | | | | | | | | | | Points |
| | Rating | Rank | 1 | 2 | 3 | 4 | 5 | 6 | 7 | 8 | 9 | 10 | 11 | 12 | 13 | 14 | Points |
|---|---|---|---|---|---|---|---|---|---|---|---|---|---|---|---|---|---|
| Gukesh Dommaraju (IND) | 2783 | 5 | 0 | ½ | 1 | ½ | ½ | ½ | ½ | ½ | ½ | ½ | 1 | 0 | ½ | 1 | 7½ |
| Ding Liren (CHN) | 2728 | 23 | 1 | ½ | 0 | ½ | ½ | ½ | ½ | ½ | ½ | ½ | 0 | 1 | ½ | 0 | 6½ |

Prior to the 2024 World Championship match, Ding was widely perceived as a significant underdog, largely due to his mental struggles throughout the year. In an interview with Singaporean newspaper The Straits Times, Ding said, "It doesn't seem like I've been playing the way I used to… and their assessment is correct and I don't know if I will ever reach that level again." Oddsmakers gave Ding 3-to-1 odds to win, equaling roughly a 25% chance. Throughout the match, much analysis continued to center around Ding's mental struggles. Several commentators responded with admiration for his fighting spirit and confidence in several games. Grandmaster Anish Giri, following Ding's win in Game 12 to tie the match, said, "[Ding] seemed so broken, completely, yesterday, and now he plays an absolutely incredible game throughout, just all the way!"

In game 14, Ding made a crucial mistake in the endgame by allowing his opponent to force a trade of two pieces while down a pawn, transforming a drawn position into a loss and thereby losing his title of World Chess Champion. Despite speculation that Ding would retire following the match, he stated in an interview that he would continue to play.

=== 2025–present ===
In 2025, Ding won the Shenzhen Masters chess tournament held from December 12 to 15 in Shenzhen.

In April 2026, he participated in the 8th SCO Team Chess Championship, where China I won after defeating Russia in the finals. Ding won in the armageddon game in the tiebreaks, by drawing with the black pieces. A few days later, on 19th April, he participated in his first classical tournament since losing the 2024 World Championship match, in the Chinese Team Chess Championship 2026, where he won in round 1 against Chen Qi B. He finished the tournament with 4/5 and a 2795 performance rating. He qualified to the Total Chess World Championship 2026 by rating on 1 June 2026.

In June 2026, Ding played on Board 1 for team Dragon Chilling in the World Rapid and Blitz Team Chess Championships 2026, with his team winning the gold medal in both the rapid and blitz sections. In September, he returned as board one for the Chinese team at the 46th Chess Olympiad at Samarkand. He finished with a score of 6/11 (+3−2=6) and a performance rating of 2650. He beat Vincent Keymer in round 6, beating his first 2700+ opponent since Gukesh in the 2024 World Chess Championship game 12. In October 2026, he finished second place in the Shenzhen Masters, beating Meng Yihan 3-1 in quarterfinals, Kong Xiangrui 2.5-1.5 in Semifinal, and lost to Yu Yangyi 4-3 in the finals after flagging in the Armageddon game with black.

== Results ==
- November 2003: U-10 World Youth Championship in Heraklio, joint 1st on 9½/11 points with Eltaj Safarli, 2nd on tiebreak
- April 2004: Chinese Men's Team Championship in Jinan, scored 1/4
- November 2004: U-12 World Youth Championship in Heraklio, joint 1st on 9½/11 points with Zhao Nan, 2nd on tiebreak
- July 2005: Chinese Individual Championship in Hefei
- April 2007: Zonal Tournament 3½ (China) in Dezhou, scored 6½/9
- July 2007: Chinese Men's Championship Individual Group B in Zhuhai, scored 7/10
- May 2008: Chinese Individual Championship in Beijing, scored 5½/11 finishing 6th
- June 2008: Men's Selective Tournament for Olympiad in Ningbo, scored 4/10
- July 2008: Czech Open 2008 MS U14 U16 – M-silnice Open in Pardubice, scored 5/5
- April 2009: Men's Zonal Tournament 3½ (China) in Beijing, scored 5/11
- May 2009: 8th Asian Continental Individual Open Championship in Subic Bay Freeport, scored 6/11 (first grandmaster norm)
- May 2009: Chinese Individual Championship in Xinghua, Jiangsu, 1st with 8½/11 and 2800+ TPR (second GM norm)
- August 2009: Russia – China (men) in Dagomys, scored 2½/5
- September 2009: Chinese Chess King in Jinzhou, scored 3½/7
- October 2009, he became China's 30th grandmaster.
- April 2011: Chinese Individual Championship in Xinghua, Jiangsu, 1st with 9/11
- Chess World Cup 2011: knocked out by Wesley So
- April 2012: Chinese Individual Championship in Xinghua, Jiangsu, 1st with 8/11
- October 2012: SPICE Cup in St. Louis, tied for 2nd with 5½/10
- In the 2013 Alekhine Memorial tournament, held from 20 April to 1 May, Liren finished ninth, with +1−3=5.
- July-2015: Ding Liren won the Ding Liren – Gelfand (2015) match by 3–1 (+2 =2).
- March–April 2017: Won the Longgang Shenzhen Grandmaster Tournament.
- May 2017: Won the Moscow Grand Prix with 6/9
- September 2017: Reached the final of the 2017 Chess World Cup. This qualified him for the Candidates Tournament, the first Chinese player to do so. He subsequently lost on rapid tiebreak in the final to Levon Aronian.
- March 2018: Candidates Tournament 2018, Berlin. Placed clear 4th with +1−0=13, the only candidate without a loss at the event.
- April 2018: Shamkir Chess 2018, finished 2nd with 5½/9 (+2–0=7).
- August 2019: He finished second place in the Saint Louis Rapid and Blitz event with a score of 21½/36. The second place was tied and shared with Yu Yangyi and Maxime Vachier-Lagrave.
- August 2019: Ding won the 2019 Sinquefield Cup by beating Magnus Carlsen in both blitz tiebreak games after drawing both rapid tiebreak games; both Ding and Carlsen scored 6½/11 (+2–0=9) in the classical games.
- October 2019: Reached the final of the 2019 Chess World Cup, his second consecutive finals appearance in World Cup competition. He lost in blitz tiebreak in the final to Teimour Radjabov.
- December 2019: Ding won the Grand Chess Tour Finals by beating Levon Aronian in the semi-finals and Maxime Vachier-Lagrave in the finals.
- March 2020 and April 2021: Ding played in the Candidates Tournament for the right to face Magnus Carlsen for the World Chess Championship. He got off to a slow start, losing his first two games but finished the tournament with three straight wins to finish in 5th place. His final win was with the white pieces over the tournament winner, Ian Nepomniachtchi.
- June–July 2021: Finished in 4th place in the Goldmoney Asian Rapid tournament. He was one of eight players to advance to the knockout stage of the tournament after a 3rd-place finish in the round-robin phase of the tournament. Defeated Jan-Krzysztof Duda 1½–½ in the quarterfinals before losing to Vladislav Artemiev in the semi-finals 2–1. He lost to Magnus Carlsen in the 3rd place match.
- December 2021: Ding was a semi-finalist at the 2021 Speed Chess Championship, losing the tiebreaker game to GM Hikaru Nakamura after a four-hour back-and-forth struggle.
- May 2022: Ding won the 2022 Chessable Masters after defeating Magnus Carlsen in the semi-finals and R Praggnanandhaa in the finals.
- July 2022: Finished second at the Candidates Tournament 2022 with a score 8/14, by beating GM Hikaru Nakamura in the last round.
- April 2023: Ding won the World Chess Championship 2023, by beating GM Ian Nepomniachtchi in the tie breaks 2½ to 1½.
- December 2024: Lost his world chess championship title defence to Gukesh Dommaraju of India 6½ to 7½ in the 2024 World Chess Championship held in Singapore.
- December 2025: Won the Shenzhen Nanshan Masters. Defeated GM Bu Xiangzhi 2½ to 1½ in the quarterfinals, IM Jiang Haochen 3 to 1 in the semifinals, and GM Wang Hao 2½ to 1½ in the final. It was his first tournament win since winning the 2023 World Chess Championship.
- June 2026: Won the gold medal in the rapid and blitz sections of the World Rapid and Blitz Team Chess Championships 2026 as part of team Dragon Chilling.
- September 2026: Board one for China in the 46th Chess Olympiad, scored 6/11, defeating Patrick Kawuma, Arkadij Naiditsch, Vincent Keymer, and losing to Nodirbek Abdusattorov and Igor Kovalenko
- October 2026: 2nd place in Shenzhen Masters 2026 after losing to Yu Yangyi in the finals 3-4.

== Personal life ==
He is accompanied by his mother on his travels. In an interview with Die Zeit in February 2024, he said he was dysphoric and had problems sleeping. In November 2024, he was quoted as saying he simply no longer enjoyed his work and suffered psychological problems.

== Notable games ==
Bai vs. Ding, 2017

Position: h1 white rook, f1 white bishop, g2 white pawn, f2 black rook, a2 white pawn, h3 white pawn, e3 white pawn, g4 white king, e4 black knight, c4 white pawn, g5 white bishop, e5 black knight, g6 black bishop, h7 black king, f7 white knight, e7 black bishop, b7 white queen, a7 black pawn, h8 black rook

Position after 32...Ne5+
- Bai Jinshi vs. Ding Liren, Chinese League, China, 2017, rd 18
  In a constant push for the initiative, Ding places multiple pieces en prise, leading to a king hunt ending with a forced mate.
Nimzo-Indian Defence, Kasparov Variation (ECO E21)
1.d4 Nf6 2.c4 e6 3.Nc3 Bb4 4.Nf3 0-0 5.Bg5 c5 6.e3 cxd4 7.Qxd4 Nc6 8.Qd3 h6 9.Bh4 d5 10.Rd1 g5 11.Bg3 Ne4 12.Nd2 Nc5 13.Qc2 d4 14.Nf3 e5 15.Nxe5 dxc3 16.Rxd8 cxb2+ 17.Ke2 Rxd8 18.Qxb2 Na4 19.Qc2 Nc3+ 20.Kf3 Rd4 21.h3 h5 22.Bh2 g4+ 23.Kg3 Rd2 24.Qb3 Ne4+ 25.Kh4 Be7+ 26.Kxh5 Kg7 27.Bf4 Bf5 28.Bh6+ Kh7 29.Qxb7 Rxf2 30.Bg5 Rh8 31.Nxf7 Bg6+ 32.Kxg4 Ne5+ (diagram) 0–1

The game would have finished with 33.Nxe5 Bf5+ 34.Kh5 Kg7+ 35.Bh6+ Rxh6# or 33.Kh4 Kg8+ 34.Nxh8 Bxg5#, the latter line resulting in a pure mate.

- Magnus Carlsen vs. Ding Liren, Sinquefield Cup 2019 Tiebreaks (blitz), St Louis, MO US, rd 4, 29 Aug
  In a playoff for the Sinquefield Cup title, Ding played a dynamic exchange sacrifice and got a winning mating attack, based on the beautiful retreating move, 40...Ne7.
Spanish Game: Closed. Martinez Variation (ECO C78)
1.e4 e5 2.Nf3 Nc6 3.Bb5 a6 4.Ba4 Nf6 5.0-0 Be7 6.d3 b5 7.Bb3 d6 8.c3 Na5 9.Bc2 c5 10.d4 cxd4 11.cxd4 0-0 12.h3 Re8 13.d5 Bd7 14.Nc3 Qb8 15.Bd3 Rc8 16.Ne2 Nb7 17.g4 Nc5 18.Ng3 Nxd3 19.Qxd3 b4 20.Re1 Qb5 21.Qd1 Rc7 22.Be3 Rac8 23.Nd2 g6 24.b3 Qb7 25.Nc4 Bb5 26.Na5 Qb8 27.Qd2 Rc3 28.a3 bxa3 29.Nc6 Bxc6 30.Qxc3 Bxd5 31.Qa5 Bxe4 32.g5 Ba8 33.Qxa6 Nd5 34.Ba7 Qc7 35.Rec1 Qxc1+ 36.Rxc1 Rxc1+ 37.Kh2 Bc6 38.Qxa3 Bxg5 39.Qxd6 Bf4 40.Bc5 Ne7 0–1
- Ding Liren vs. Gukesh Dommaraju, World Chess Championship 2024, Singapore SIN, rd 12, 9 Dec
  Trailing the World Championship match by 1 point, Ding struck back with a flawless game, increasing the pressure from a quiet opening until Gukesh's position collapsed. Chess.com named the game as their 2024 Game of the Year.
English Opening: Agincourt Defence (ECO A13)
1.c4 e6 2.g3 d5 3.Bg2 Nf6 4.Nf3 d4 5.0-0 Nc6 6.e3 Be7 7.d3 dxe3 8.Bxe3 e5 9.Nc3 0-0 10.Re1 h6 11.a3 a5 12.h3 Be6 13.Kh2 Rb8 14.Qc2 Re8 15.Nb5 Bf5 16.Rad1 Nd7 17.Qd2 Bg6 18.d4 e4 19.Ng1 Nb6 20.Qc3 Bf6 21.Qc2 a4 22.Ne2 Bg5 23.Nf4 Bxf4 24.Bxf4 Rc8 25.Qc3 Nb8 26.d5 Qd7 27.d6 c5 28.Nc7 Rf8 29.Bxe4 Nc6 30.Bg2 Rcd8 31.Nd5 Nxd5 32.cxd5 Nb8 33.Qxc5 Rc8 34.Qd4 Na6 35.Re7 Qb5 36.d7 Rc4 37.Qe3 Rc2 38.Bd6 f6 39.Rxg7+ 1–0

== Notes ==
| Preceded by Magnus Carlsen | World Chess Champion; 2023–2024 | Succeeded by Gukesh Dommaraju |
| Preceded by: Ni Hua; Wang Hao | Chinese Chess Champion; 2009, 2010–2011 | Succeeded by Wei Yi |
