= Wenzhou Zhouyuan Elementary School =

Chant Garden Elementary School

Location
- Sheng Xi Bridge No. 54; Wenzhou, Zhejiang; China

Information
- Type: Elementary school, private, day
- Motto: 關注世界,關愛生命 “Showing Concern for the World, Showing Love for Lives”
- Established: 2002
- Founder: Wenzhou Education Bureau
- Head of school: Jin Zixiang
- Faculty: 198
- Grades: 1-6
- Gender: Coeducational
- Enrollment: 2600
- Campus: Urban
- Website: www.wzes.net

Wenzhou Zhouyuan Elementary School
- Traditional Chinese: 溫州市籀園小學
- Simplified Chinese: 温州市籀园小学
Transcriptions
Standard Mandarin
- Hanyu Pinyin: Wēnzhōushì Zhòuyuán Xiǎoxué

Chant Garden Elementary School is a private elementary school in Wenzhou, China. Since its establishment, it has been one of the most prestigious elementary schools in the Greater China Region and also serves as a "model school" in many areas of education for elementary schools all across China.

In February 2005, it was named as the "Garden Institution" by the Wenzhou government and the "International Education Experimental School" by UNESCO.

Throughout its history, it has earned both significant domestic and international recognition from the World Health Organization, UNESCO, Ministry of Education of the People's Republic of China, National Institute of Education Sciences, China Qiyuan, State General Administration of Sports and Ministry of Education of the People's Republic of China.

Chant Garden Elementary School is the headquarters of Wenzhou Mathematician Cradle Project, the model school of National Primary Foreign Language Research and Education, the cultural school of chess in China, the model practice base of National Teenager Etiquette Education, and the model practice base of National Primary Chess Teaching and Research Education.

== Location ==
Chant Garden Elementary School is located on the water surface of Nine-Mountain lake in downtown Wenzhou with three sides facing directly at the lake. Therefore, it is usually called by locals the "Garden School on Water".

There is a popular saying in Wenzhou of the location of the school: "school in the midst of the lake, lake in the midst of the garden" (園中湖,湖中校).

== History ==
In 2002, the Wenzhou Education Bureau founded Chant Garden Elementary School (then Wenzhou Experimental Primary School) in downtown Wenzhou, on the water surface of Nine-Mountain Lake. In 2007, it became a state-owned private school. In 2012, it became a privately owned private school.

== Chant Garden ==
The Chant Garden (籀園) on campus was built in 1912 in honor of Sun Yirang, the first person in the history of the world to decipher the oracle bone script. Sun Yirang's work Qiwen Juli (契文舉例), published posthumously by Luo Zhenyu, was the first work of decipherment of the oracle bone script historically.

== Chess culture ==
Chant Garden Elementary School has a rich history of education and excellence in chess, particularly in international chess.

The school's chess team ranked No.1 in the country and was the national champion in 2012.

== Departments ==
The school has five departments on campus focused on literature, journalism, athletics, arts and science.

=== Department of literature ===
The department of literature, originally known as the "Wenzhou Zhouyuan literature club", is composed of four student clubs: Chant Garden Story Room, Chant Garden Readers Room, Chant Garden Lecture Hall and Chant Garden Literature Club. The department of literature was founded in order to strengthen students' interest and passion in literature, improve the culture of reading on campus, and also prepare students with great knowledge in literature.

=== Department of journalism ===
The department of journalism was founded in 2017 with congratulatory remarks from senior leadership of School of Journalism and Communication at Tsinghua University.

=== Department of athletics ===
The department of athletics serves the health and physical education of all students of the school. For students of grade 1 and 2, the department requires every student on campus to take chess class and learn to play chess. For students of grade 3 and 4, the department requires every student on campus to take swimming class and learn to swim. For students of grade 5, the department requires every student on campus to take soccer class and learn to play soccer. For students of grade 6, the department requires every student on campus to take basketball class and learn to play basketball.

The school's basketball team is ranked No.1 in the province of Zhejiang.

=== Department of arts ===
The goal of the department of arts is to educate students with beauty and inspire wisdom with beauty of arts.

=== Department of science ===
The department of science was founded in September 2003. Currently, the department has 15 classrooms for studios such as Botanic Tissue Clone Laboratory and Little Eye Studio. Over 600 students have won awards at the national, province, and city levels.

== Notable alumni ==
- Ding Liren 丁立人 (1992-), chess Grandmaster, youngest-ever winner of Chinese Chess Championship at age 16, first and only Chinese World Chess Championship winner, ranked 1st nationally and 2nd internationally as of June 2022, renowned as the new "King of Chess" in China and the current FIDE world champion.
