= Champions Chess Tour 2022 =

Series of elite chess tournaments

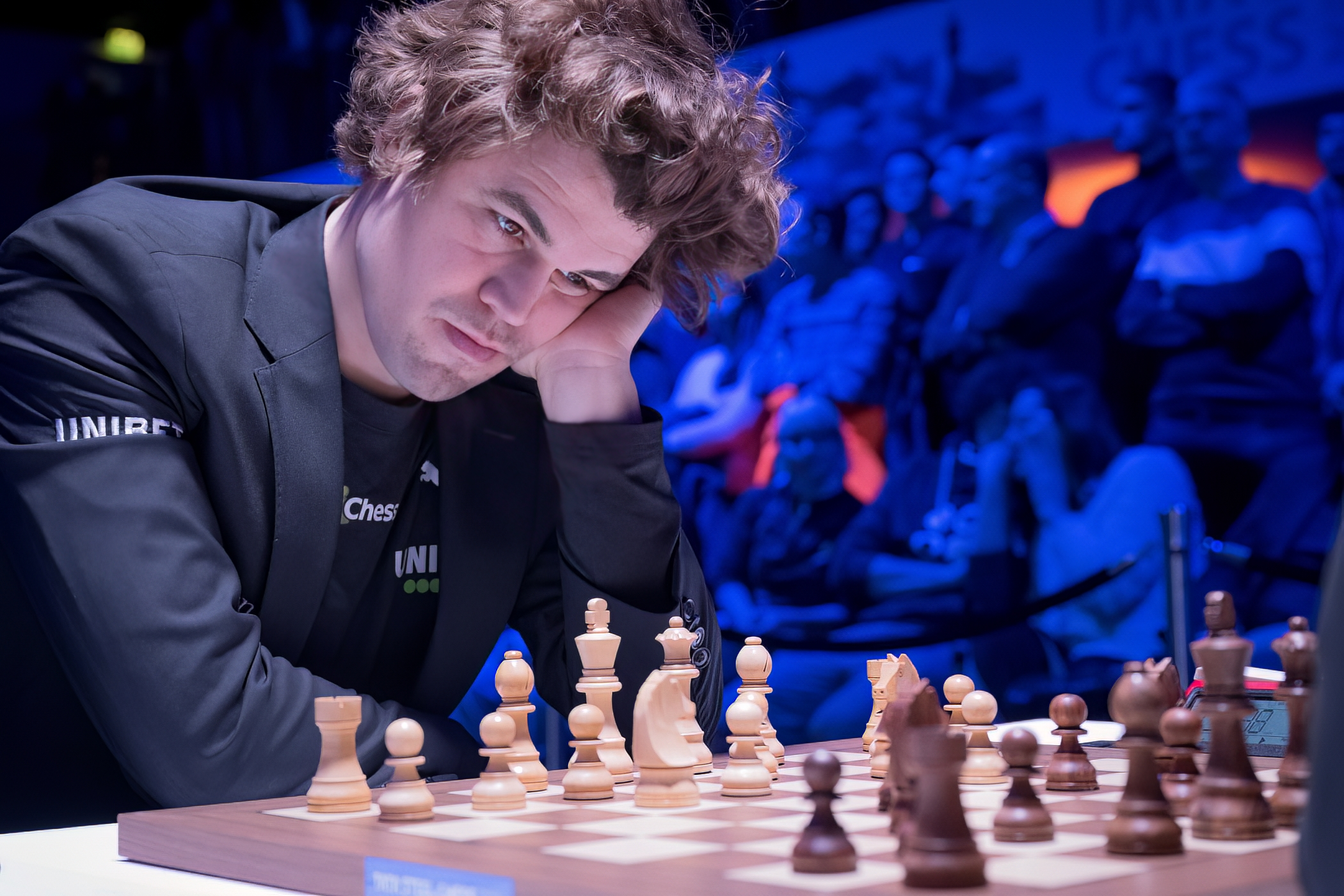
- Magnus Carlsen, winner of the tour

Details
- Duration: 19 February 2022 – 20 November 2022
- Tournaments: 9
- Categories: Regular (6); Major (3)

Achievements (singles)
- Most titles: (Norway) Magnus Carlsen (5)
- Prize money leader: (Norway) Magnus Carlsen ($242,500)

The Champions Chess Tour 2022, known for sponsorship reasons as the Meltwater Champions Chess Tour, was a 9-month series of nine online chess tournaments featuring some of the world's top players, who played for a prize money pool of US$1.6 million. The tour started on February 19, 2022, and lasted until November 20, 2022.

== Schedule ==
There were 9 tournaments in the tour: 6 labelled as Regular and 3 labelled as Major.

Dates	Tournament Name	Type
February 19–26	Airthings Masters	Regular
March 19–26	Charity Cup	Regular
April 22–28	Oslo Esports Cup	Major
May 19–26	Chessable Masters	Regular
July 10–17	FTX Road to Miami	Regular
August 15–21	FTX Crypto Cup	Major
September 18–25	Julius Baer Generation Cup	Regular
October 14–21	Aimchess Rapid	Regular
November 14–20	Tour Finals	Major

== Format ==
The format was similar to that of the previous season, with some innovations.

=== Qualification ===
==== Regular ====
Each Regular tournament had 16 participants. In all Regular tournaments but the first, the top 8 players from the previous tournament (Regular or Major) were invited. The remaining spots were filled by wildcards chosen by the organizer.

==== Major ====
Each Major tournament had 8 participants: the top two players of each of the previous two Regular tournaments, the top two players in the overall tour standings, and two wildcards. The tour regulations did not specify what happens if these groups of players overlap.

=== Time controls ===
Three different time controls were used in the tour:

- In rapid games, each player has 15 minutes, plus a 10-second increment for each move.
- In blitz games, each player has 5 minutes, plus a 3-second increment for each move.
- In Armageddon games, White has 5 minutes and Black has 4 minutes, with no increment.

=== Stages ===
==== Regular ====
Each Regular tournament consisted of a preliminary stage with 15 rounds and a knockout stage with three rounds. In the preliminary stage, 16 players participated in a round-robin spanning four days, with each player playing one rapid game against each other player, for a total of 120 games. In contrast to the previous season, a win scores 3 points and a draw scores 1 point. The eight players with the most points advance to the next stage. Ties are resolved according to the following criteria, in that order:

1. Result in the game(s) between the tied players
2. Number of wins (including forfeits)
3. Sonneborn–Berger score
4. Koya score

In the quarterfinals and semifinals, each matchup consists of four rapid games played on a single day, with one point for a win and half a point for a draw. Ties are resolved by a playoff consisting of two blitz games. If these also end in a tie, an Armageddon game is played; if this ends in a draw, the Black player wins the round. The player who ranked higher in the preliminary stage gets to pick a colour.

The final consists of two matches of four rapid games each, played on successive days. Each match is scored separately. A tie (if each player wins one match or both matches are tied) is resolved as in the other knockout rounds. There is no match for third place.

==== Major ====
Each Major tournament will be a round-robin tournament among eight players, without a knockout stage. Each pair of players plays a match of four rapid games as in the knockout stage of Regular tournaments, including blitz and Armageddon tie-breaks if necessary. If the match is decided in the rapid games, the winner gets 3 match points; if it is decided in tie-breaks, the winner gets 2 match points and the loser 1 match point. Ties in the total match points at the end of the tournament are resolved according to the following criteria, in that order:

1. Result in the match(es) between the tied players
2. Number of match wins (including forfeits)

=== Tour points and prize money ===
There is no longer a distinction between tour points and prize money as in the previous season. The player who accumulates the most prize money over the course of the tour wins the tour. The winner is awarded an additional $50,000.

==== Regular ====
The total prize pool for a Regular tournament is $150,000, of which $60,000 are distributed as follows:

Finish	Prize
Winner	$25,000
Runner-up	$15,000
Semifinalists	$6,000
Quarterfinalists	$2,000

In other words, $2,000 are awarded for reaching the quarterfinals, $4,000 for winning a quarterfinal, $9,000 for winning a semifinal and $10,000 for winning a final.

The remaining $90,000 can be won in the preliminary stage, with $250 being awarded per point, that is, $750 for a win and $250 for a draw. The remaining $250 in case of a draw accumulate in a bonus pot that starts out with $20,000 and is used for performance awards at the end of the season.

==== Major ====
The total prize pool for a Major tournament is $210,000, with $2,500 being awarded for each match point. A player with less than 2 match points nevertheless receives $5,000, but only the prize money earned with match points is included in the tour standings.

== Results ==
=== Tournament results ===
Tournament Name	Type	Winner	Runner-up
Airthings Masters	Regular	(Norway) Magnus Carlsen	(Russia) Ian Nepomniachtchi
Charity Cup	Regular	(Norway) Magnus Carlsen	(Poland) Jan-Krzysztof Duda
Oslo Esports Cup	Major	(Poland) Jan-Krzysztof Duda	(Vietnam) Lê Quang Liêm
Chessable Masters	Regular	(China) Ding Liren	(India) R Praggnanandhaa
FTX Road to Miami	Regular	(United States) Levon Aronian	(China) Wei Yi
FTX Crypto Cup	Major	(Norway) Magnus Carlsen	(India) R Praggnanandhaa
Julius Baer Generation Cup	Regular	(Norway) Magnus Carlsen	(India) Arjun Erigaisi
Aimchess Rapid	Regular	(Poland) Jan-Krzysztof Duda	(Azerbaijan) Shakhriyar Mamedyarov
Tour Finals	Major	(Norway) Magnus Carlsen	(United States) Wesley So

=== Tour rankings ===
Prize money is shown in thousands of US dollars. An asterisk denotes a Major tournament.

Pos	Name	Airthings Masters	Charity Cup	Oslo Esports Cup*	Chessable Masters	FTX Road to Miami	FTX Crypto Cup*	Generation Cup	Aimchess Rapid	Tour Finals*	Total
1	(Norway) Magnus Carlsen	31¼	32¼	30	13		40	33½	12½	50	242½
2	(Poland) Jan-Krzysztof Duda	4¼	20¾	35		13	27½	5	32	25	162½
3	(India) R Praggnanandhaa	4¾	5¼	30	21¼		37½	7¾		22½	129
4	(Vietnam) Lê Quang Liêm	7½	14	32½			30	11½		27½	123
5	(Netherlands) Anish Giri	5¼		22½	13¼	8	17½	5¼	5	15	91¾
6	(Azerbaijan) Shakhriyar Mamedyarov	4¼		27½	7½	4½			21¾	15	80½
7	(United States) Levon Aronian	5¼				30½	20	7¼			63
8	(India) Arjun Erigaisi					9¾		21¼	8¾	22½	62¼
9	(China) Ding Liren	7½	11¾		31¼						50½
10	(Netherlands) Jorden van Foreest		8¾	25	4¼						38
11	(France) Alireza Firouzja						37½				37½
12	(United States) Wesley So									32½	32½
13	(Romania) Richárd Rapport		5¼			12¾			11½		29½
14	(China) Wei Yi				8	19¾					27¾
15	(Canada) Eric Hansen	7¾	4	7½	3¾				3¼		26¼
16	(Germany) Vincent Keymer	7½						11¾	4¾		24
17	(United States) Hans Niemann	3¾	7½			3½	0	8			22¾
18	(FIDE) Ian Nepomniachtchi	22¼									22¼
19	(Spain) David Antón Guijarro		8		7				4		19
20	(India) Vidit Gujrathi		5		4¼				7¼		16½
21	(Uzbekistan) Nodirbek Abdusattorov	4¾							7¾		12½
22	(FIDE) Andrey Esipenko	12									12
22	(FIDE) Vladislav Artemiev	12									12
22	(Czech Republic) David Navara		7¼					4¾			12
22	(India) Pentala Harikrishna		4		4½				3½		12
26	(Norway) Aryan Tari				7	4½					11½
27	(United States) Samuel Sevian					10					10
28	(India) Gukesh D								8¾		8¾
28	(Poland) Radosław Wojtaszek					4½		4¼			8¾
30	(United States) Jeffery Xiong					8					8
31	(United States) Sam Shankland				4	3¼					7¼
31	(United States) Christopher Yoo							7¼			7¼
33	(China) Ju Wenjun		2½			4					6½
33	(Sweden) Nils Grandelius				4				2½		6½
35	(England) Gawain Jones		2½		3						5½
36	(United States) Leinier Domínguez					4¼					4¼
37	(United States) Daniel Naroditsky								4		4
37	(Ukraine) Vasyl Ivanchuk							4			4
39	(Croatia) Ivan Šarić							3½			3½
40	(India) Aditya Mittal								3		3
41	(United States) Abhimanyu Mishra				2½						2½
41	(Israel) Boris Gelfand							2½			2½
41	(India) Adhiban Baskaran							2½			2½
44	(FIDE) Alexandra Kosteniuk	¾									¾
45	(China) Lei Tingjie		½								½
46	(Azerbaijan) Teimour Radjabov					0					0

Legend
Did not participate	Eliminated in preliminary stage	Lost in quarterfinals	Lost in semifinals	Runner-Up	Winner

The bonus pot, which started off with $20,000, has grown to $61,250 due to 165 draws in preliminary stages.

=== Tournaments ===
==== Airthings Masters ====
This initial tournament started on February 19 and ended on February 26.

===== Preliminary stage =====
	Name	Elo	01	02	03	04	05	06	07	08	09	10	11	12	13	14	15	16	Points
01	Ian Nepomniachtchi (Russia)	2773	–	3	1	3	0	1	1	1	0	3	3	3	1	3	3	3	29
02	Magnus Carlsen (Norway)	2865	0	–	3	0	0	1	3	3	1	1	0	1	3	3	3	3	25
03	Vladislav Artemiev (Russia)	2700	1	0	–	3	1	0	3	3	3	1	0	1	1	1	3	3	24
04	Andrey Esipenko (Russia)	2714	0	3	0	–	1	3	0	3	3	1	0	1	0	3	3	3	24
05	Eric Hansen (Canada)	2606	3	3	1	1	–	1	0	1	1	0	3	0	3	3	3	0	23
06	Ding Liren (China)	2799	1	1	3	0	1	–	3	3	0	0	3	1	1	1	1	3	22
07	Lê Quang Liêm (Vietnam)	2709	1	0	0	3	3	0	–	3	1	0	1	0	3	3	1	3	22
08	Vincent Keymer (Germany)	2664	1	0	0	0	1	0	0	–	1	3	1	3	3	3	3	3	22
09	Levon Aronian (United States)	2772	3	1	0	0	1	3	1	1	–	1	0	3	3	1	0	3	21
10	Anish Giri (Netherlands)	2772	0	1	1	1	3	3	3	0	1	–	1	1	0	0	3	3	21
11	R Praggnanandhaa (India)	2612	0	3	3	3	0	0	1	1	3	1	–	1	0	0	0	3	19
12	Nodirbek Abdusattorov (Uzbekistan)	2651	0	1	1	1	3	1	3	0	0	1	1	–	1	0	3	3	19
13	Jan-Krzysztof Duda (Poland)	2760	1	0	1	3	0	1	0	0	0	3	3	1	–	1	0	3	17
14	Shakhriyar Mamedyarov (Azerbaijan)	2767	0	0	1	0	0	1	0	0	1	3	3	3	1	–	1	3	17
15	Hans Niemann (United States)	2642	0	0	0	0	0	1	1	0	3	0	3	0	3	1	–	3	15
16	Alexandra Kosteniuk (Russia)	2516	0	0	0	0	3	0	0	0	0	0	0	0	0	0	0	–	3

===== Knockout stage =====
Quarterfinals (February 23)
(Russia) Ian Nepomniachtchi	2½	–
(Germany) Vincent Keymer	1½	–
(Canada) Eric Hansen	1	–
(Russia) Andrey Esipenko	3	–
(Russia) Vladislav Artemiev	2½	–
(China) Ding Liren	1½	–
(Vietnam) Lê Quang Liêm	1½	–
(Norway) Magnus Carlsen	2½	–

Semifinals (February 24)
(Russia) Ian Nepomniachtchi	2½	–
(Russia) Andrey Esipenko	½	–
(Russia) Vladislav Artemiev	½	–
(Norway) Magnus Carlsen	2½	–

Final (February 25–26)
(Russia) Ian Nepomniachtchi	2	½	–
(Norway) Magnus Carlsen	2	2½	–

==== Charity Cup ====
This tournament started on March 19 and ended on March 26.

===== Preliminary stage =====
	Name	Elo	01	02	03	04	05	06	07	08	09	10	11	12	13	14	15	16	Points
01	Lê Quang Liêm (Vietnam)	2723	–	1	1	3	3	0	1	3	1	3	3	3	1	3	3	3	32
02	Magnus Carlsen (Norway)	2854	1	–	1	1	1	0	3	0	3	3	1	3	3	3	3	3	29
03	Jorden van Foreest (Netherlands)	2714	1	1	–	3	0	3	3	3	3	0	1	1	1	3	1	3	27
04	David Antón Guijarro (Spain)	2694	0	1	0	–	1	1	0	1	3	3	3	1	1	3	3	3	24
05	Jan-Krzysztof Duda (Poland)	2720	0	1	3	1	–	1	3	3	1	3	0	3	0	3	0	1	23
06	Ding Liren (China)	2752	3	3	0	1	1	–	0	1	0	0	1	3	3	3	1	3	23
07	Hans Niemann (United States)	2624	1	0	0	3	0	3	–	0	0	1	1	1	3	3	3	3	22
08	David Navara (Czech Republic)	2700	0	3	0	1	0	1	3	–	1	1	1	0	1	3	3	3	21
09	Richárd Rapport (Hungary)	2762	1	0	0	0	1	3	3	1	–	1	0	3	1	1	3	3	21
10	R Praggnanandhaa (India)	2664	0	0	3	0	0	3	1	1	1	–	1	3	1	1	3	3	21
11	Vidit Gujrathi (India)	2723	0	1	1	0	3	1	1	1	3	1	–	0	1	1	3	3	20
12	Eric Hansen (Canada)	2669	0	0	1	1	0	0	1	3	0	0	3	–	1	3	0	3	16
13	Pentala Harikrishna (India)	2716	1	0	1	1	3	0	0	1	1	1	1	1	–	1	1	3	16
14	Gawain Jones (England)	2672	0	0	0	0	0	0	0	0	1	1	1	0	1	–	3	3	10
15	Ju Wenjun (China)	2560	0	0	1	0	3	1	0	0	0	0	0	3	1	0	–	1	10
16	Lei Tingjie (China)	2535	0	0	0	0	1	0	0	0	0	0	0	0	0	0	1	–	2

===== Knockout stage =====
Quarterfinals (March 23)
(Vietnam) Lê Quang Liêm	2½	–
(Czech Republic) David Navara	1½	–
(Poland) Jan-Krzysztof Duda	2½	–
(Spain) David Antón Guijarro	½	–
(Netherlands) Jorden van Foreest	½	–
(China) Ding Liren	2½	–
(United States) Hans Niemann	½	–
(Norway) Magnus Carlsen	2½	–

Semifinals (March 24)
(Vietnam) Lê Quang Liêm	1½	–
(Poland) Jan-Krzysztof Duda	2½	–
(China) Ding Liren	1	–
(Norway) Magnus Carlsen	3	–

Final (March 25–26)
(Poland) Jan-Krzysztof Duda	½	2½	0
(Norway) Magnus Carlsen	2½	1½	2

==== Oslo Esports Cup ====
This tournament started on April 22 and ended on April 28. For each match, the table shows the match points gained, with the match result in parentheses.

	Name	Elo	1	2	3	4	5	6	7	8	Points
1	Jan-Krzysztof Duda (Poland)	2769	–	1 (2 : 4)	0 (½ : 2½)	3 (2½ : ½)	2 (4 : 2)	3 (2½ : ½)	2 (4 : 2)	3 (2½ : ½)	14
2	Lê Quang Liêm (Vietnam)	2765	2 (4 : 2)	–	3 (2½ : 1½)	0 (½ : 2½)	0 (1½ : 2½)	2 (3½ : 2½)	3 (2½ : ½)	3 (2½ : ½)	13
3	Magnus Carlsen (Norway)	2851	3 (2½ : ½)	0 (1½ : 2½)	–	3 (3 : 0)	0 (½ : 2½)	0 (1½ : 2½)	3 (2½ : ½)	3 (2½ : ½)	12
4	R Praggnanandhaa (India)	2685	0 (½ : 2½)	3 (2½ : ½)	0 (0 : 3)	–	3 (2½ : ½)	3 (2½ : ½)	0 (½ : 2½)	3 (2½ : ½)	12
5	Shakhriyar Mamedyarov (Azerbaijan)	2724	1 (2 : 4)	3 (2½ : 1½)	3 (2½ : ½)	0 (½ : 2½)	–	2 (3½ : 2½)	2 (3½ : 2½)	0 (1½ : 2½)	11
6	Jorden van Foreest (Netherlands)	2744	0 (½ : 2½)	1 (2½ : 3½)	3 (2½ : 1½)	0 (½ : 2½)	1 (2½ : 3½)	–	2 (4 : 2)	3 (2½ : 1½)	10
7	Anish Giri (Netherlands)	2759	1 (2 : 4)	0 (½ : 2½)	0 (½ : 2½)	3 (2½ : ½)	1 (2½ : 3½)	1 (2 : 4)	–	3 (2½ : 1½)	9
8	Eric Hansen (Canada)	2651	0 (½ : 2½)	0 (½ : 2½)	0 (½ : 2½)	0 (½ : 2½)	3 (2½ : 1½)	0 (1½ : 2½)	0 (1½ : 2½)	–	3

==== Chessable Masters ====
This tournament started on May 19 and ended on May 26.

===== Preliminary stage =====
	Name	Elo	01	02	03	04	05	06	07	08	09	10	11	12	13	14	15	16	Points
01	Anish Giri (Netherlands)	2730	–	1	1	3	3	1	1	1	1	3	3	1	1	3	3	3	29
02	Magnus Carlsen (Norway)	2824	1	–	1	0	1	1	1	1	1	3	3	3	3	3	3	3	28
03	Ding Liren (China)	2753	1	1	–	3	1	1	1	1	3	3	1	1	1	1	3	3	25
04	R Praggnanandhaa (India)	2706	0	3	0	–	1	0	0	3	1	3	3	1	1	3	3	3	25
05	Wei Yi (China)	2729	0	1	1	1	–	1	3	1	3	3	0	3	1	3	3	0	24
06	Shakhriyar Mamedyarov (Azerbaijan)	2745	1	1	1	3	1	–	1	1	3	1	1	3	3	1	1	0	22
07	David Antón Guijarro (Spain)	2721	1	1	1	3	0	1	–	3	1	1	1	1	3	0	0	3	20
08	Aryan Tari (Norway)	2654	1	1	1	0	1	1	0	–	0	3	3	1	3	1	1	3	20
09	Pentala Harikrishna (India)	2689	1	1	0	1	0	0	1	3	–	0	1	1	0	3	3	3	18
10	Jorden van Foreest (Netherlands)	2736	0	0	0	0	0	1	1	0	3	–	3	0	3	0	3	3	17
11	Vidit Gujrathi (India)	2711	0	0	1	0	3	1	1	0	1	0	–	3	3	0	1	3	17
12	Nils Grandelius (Sweden)	2656	1	0	1	1	0	0	1	1	1	3	0	–	3	0	3	1	16
13	Sam Shankland (United States)	2709	1	0	1	1	1	0	0	0	3	0	0	0	–	3	3	3	16
14	Eric Hansen (Canada)	2630	0	0	1	0	0	1	3	1	0	3	3	3	0	–	0	0	15
15	Gawain Jones (England)	2587	0	0	0	0	0	1	3	1	0	0	1	0	0	3	–	3	12
16	Abhimanyu Mishra (United States)	2524	0	0	0	0	3	3	0	0	0	0	0	1	0	3	0	–	10

===== Knockout stage =====
Quarterfinals (May 23)
(Netherlands) Anish Giri	2½	–
(Norway) Aryan Tari	½	–
(China) Wei Yi	1½	–
(India) R Praggnanandhaa	2½	–
(China) Ding Liren	2½	–
(Azerbaijan) Shakhriyar Mamedyarov	1½	–
(Spain) David Antón Guijarro	½	–
(Norway) Magnus Carlsen	2½	–

Semifinals (May 24)
(Netherlands) Anish Giri	2	½
(India) R Praggnanandhaa	2	1½
(China) Ding Liren	2½	–
(Norway) Magnus Carlsen	1½	–

Final (May 25–26)
(India) R Praggnanandhaa	1½	2½	½
(China) Ding Liren	2½	1½	1½

==== FTX Road to Miami ====
This tournament started on July 10 and ended on July 17.

===== Preliminary stage =====
Teimour Radjabov played five rounds of the preliminary stage and then withdrew due to a COVID-19 infection and general ill health. His games, including the ones he had already played, were forfeited, and his opponents received the full 3 points and corresponding prize money.

	Name	Elo	01	02	03	04	05	06	07	08	09	10	11	12	13	14	15	16	Points
01	Samuel Sevian (United States)	2684	–	1	0	1	3	1	3	3	3	3	1	1	3	3	3	3	32
02	Arjun Erigaisi (India)	2688	1	–	0	0	3	1	3	1	1	3	3	3	3	3	3	3	31
03	Jan-Krzysztof Duda (Poland)	2790	3	3	–	1	1	1	1	3	0	1	1	1	3	3	3	3	28
04	Richárd Rapport (Hungary)	2727	1	3	1	–	3	1	1	3	3	0	1	1	0	3	3	3	27
05	Jeffery Xiong (United States)	2691	0	0	1	0	–	3	3	1	3	3	1	1	1	3	1	3	24
06	Anish Giri (Netherlands)	2730	1	1	1	1	0	–	1	1	1	1	3	1	3	3	3	3	24
07	Levon Aronian (United States)	2748	0	0	1	1	0	1	–	1	3	0	3	3	3	3	0	3	22
08	Wei Yi (China)	2729	0	1	0	0	1	1	1	–	1	3	3	3	0	1	1	3	19
09	Aryan Tari (Norway)	2650	0	1	3	0	0	1	0	1	–	3	3	0	3	0	0	3	18
10	Shakhriyar Mamedyarov (Azerbaijan)	2745	0	0	1	3	0	1	3	0	0	–	1	1	3	1	1	3	18
11	Radosław Wojtaszek (Poland)	2708	1	0	1	1	1	0	0	0	0	1	–	1	3	3	3	3	18
12	Leinier Domínguez (United States)	2754	1	0	1	1	1	1	0	0	3	1	1	–	3	0	1	3	17
13	Ju Wenjun (China)	2545	0	0	0	3	1	0	0	3	0	0	0	0	–	3	3	3	16
14	Hans Niemann (United States)	2651	0	0	0	0	0	0	0	1	3	1	0	3	0	–	3	3	14
15	Sam Shankland (United States)	2709	0	0	0	0	1	0	3	1	3	1	0	1	0	0	–	3	13
16	Teimour Radjabov (Azerbaijan)	2738	0	0	0	0	0	0	0	0	0	0	0	0	0	0	0	–	0

===== Knockout stage =====
Quarterfinals (July 14)
(United States) Samuel Sevian	2	½
(China) Wei Yi	2	1½
(United States) Jeffery Xiong	2	0
(Hungary) Richárd Rapport	2	2
(Poland) Jan-Krzysztof Duda	2½	–
(Netherlands) Anish Giri	1½	–
(United States) Levon Aronian	2½	–
(India) Arjun Erigaisi	1½	–

Semifinals (July 15)
(China) Wei Yi	2½	–
(Hungary) Richárd Rapport	½	–
(Poland) Jan-Krzysztof Duda	1	–
(United States) Levon Aronian	3	–

Final (July 16–17)
(China) Wei Yi	1½	½	–
(United States) Levon Aronian	2½	2½	–

==== FTX Crypto Cup ====
The FTX Crypto Cup began on the 15th August and concluded on the 21st August. Similarly to the Oslo Esports Cup, the players faced one of their 7 rivals each day over seven rounds in round-robin play. Each match consisted of 4 rapid games (15 minutes per player and a 10-second increment); if the match was tied, there was a playoff with two blitz games (5 minutes per player and a 3-second increment) and if the match was still tied, there would be a final 'Armageddon' game. Magnus Carlsen finished clear first with 16/21 points, with R Praggnanandhaa as the runner-up on 15/21 points and Alireza Firouzja as the third-place finisher also on 15/21 points - edged out by Praggnanandhaa due to tiebreak rules.

	Name	Elo	1	2	3	4	5	6	7	8	Points
1	Magnus Carlsen (Norway)	2822	–	1 (2 : 4)	2 (3½ : 2½)	3 (3 : 1)	1 (2 : 4)	3 (2½ : 1½)	3 (3 : 1)	3 (3 : 1)	16
2	R Praggnanandhaa (India)	2751	2 (4 : 2)	–	3 (2½ : 1½)	0 (½ : 2½)	1 (2 : 4)	3 (3 : 1)	3 (2½ : 1½)	3 (2½ : 1½)	15
3	Alireza Firouzja (France)	2793	1 (2½ : 3½)	0 (1½ : 2½)	–	3 (2½ : ½)	3 (2½ : 1½)	3 (2½ : 1½)	2 (4 : 3)	3 (2½ : ½)	15
4	Lê Quang Liêm (Vietnam)	2775	0 (1 : 3)	3 (2½ : ½)	0 (½ : 2½)	–	3 (2½ : ½)	0 (1½ : 2½)	3 (2½ : ½)	3 (2½ : 1½)	12
5	Jan-Krzysztof Duda (Poland)	2792	2 (4 : 2)	2 (4 : 2)	0 (1½ : 2½)	0 (½ : 2½)	–	1 (2½ : 3½)	3 (2½ : ½)	3 (3 : 0)	11
6	Levon Aronian (United States)	2793	0 (1½ : 2½)	0 (1 : 3)	0 (1½ : 2½)	3 (2½ : 1½)	2 (3½ : 2½)	–	0 (½ : 2½)	3 (2½ : 1½)	8
7	Anish Giri (Netherlands)	2783	0 (1 : 3)	0 (1½ : 2½)	1 (3 : 4)	0 (½ : 2½)	0 (½ : 2½)	3 (2½ : ½)	–	3 (2½ : 1½)	7
8	Hans Niemann (United States)	2615	0 (1 : 3)	0 (1½ : 2½)	0 (½ : 2½)	0 (1½ : 2½)	0 (0 : 3)	0 (1½ : 2½)	0 (1½ : 2½)	–	0

==== Julius Baer Generation Cup ====
This tournament started on September 18 and concluded on September 25.

Magnus Carlsen resigned after making his first move in his game against Hans Niemann. He has hinted that Niemann may have cheated in his previous game between the two grandmasters.

===== Preliminary stage =====
	Name	Elo	01	02	03	04	05	06	07	08	09	10	11	12	13	14	15	16	Points
01	Magnus Carlsen (Norway)	2837	–	3	0	1	3	3	3	3	1	3	1	3	1	3	3	3	34
02	Arjun Erigaisi (India)	2740	0	–	3	1	0	3	3	3	0	0	3	1	3	1	1	3	25
03	Hans Niemann (United States)	2620	3	0	–	1	3	0	3	3	0	3	1	0	3	0	3	1	24
04	R Praggnanandhaa (India)	2780	1	1	1	–	3	1	0	0	1	3	1	1	3	3	3	1	23
05	Vincent Keymer (Germany)	2701	0	3	0	0	–	1	1	3	1	3	3	3	0	3	1	1	23
06	Lê Quang Liêm (Vietnam)	2791	0	0	3	1	1	–	0	3	1	1	3	1	3	1	1	3	22
07	Christopher Yoo (United States)	2563	0	0	0	3	1	3	–	1	3	0	0	3	3	1	0	3	21
08	Levon Aronian (United States)	2742	0	0	0	3	0	0	1	–	3	1	0	3	3	1	3	3	21
09	Anish Giri (Netherlands)	2740	1	3	3	1	1	1	0	0	–	0	3	3	0	1	1	3	21
10	Jan-Krzysztof Duda (Poland)	2795	0	3	0	0	0	1	3	1	3	–	0	0	0	3	3	3	20
11	David Navara (Czech Republic)	2701	1	0	1	1	0	0	3	3	0	3	–	1	1	3	1	1	19
12	Radosław Wojtaszek (Poland)	2693	0	1	3	1	0	1	0	0	0	3	1	–	3	0	3	1	17
13	Vasyl Ivanchuk (Ukraine)	2678	1	0	0	0	3	0	0	0	3	3	1	0	–	3	1	1	16
14	Ivan Šarić (Croatia)	2668	0	1	3	0	0	1	1	1	1	0	0	3	0	–	3	0	14
15	Boris Gelfand (Israel)	2668	0	1	0	0	1	1	3	0	1	0	1	0	1	0	–	1	10
16	Adhiban Baskaran (India)	2569	0	0	1	1	1	0	0	0	0	0	1	1	1	3	1	–	10

===== Knockout stage =====
Quarterfinals (Sept 22)
(Norway) Magnus Carlsen	3	–
(United States) Levon Aronian	1	–
(India) R Praggnanandhaa	1	–
(Germany) Vincent Keymer	3	–
(United States) Hans Niemann	1½	–
(Vietnam) Lê Quang Liêm	2½	–
(India) Arjun Erigaisi	2	1½
(United States) Christopher Yoo	2	½

Semifinals (Sept 23)
(Norway) Magnus Carlsen	3	–
(Germany) Vincent Keymer	1	–
(Vietnam) Lê Quang Liêm	2	0
(India) Arjun Erigaisi	2	2

Final (Sept 24–25)
(Norway) Magnus Carlsen	2½	2	–
(India) Arjun Erigaisi	½	0	–

==== Aimchess Rapid ====
This tournament started on October 14 and concluded on October 21.

===== Preliminary stage =====
	Name	Elo	01	02	03	04	05	06	07	08	09	10	11	12	13	14	15	16	Points
01	Jan-Krzysztof Duda (Poland)	2754	–	3	3	1	0	1	3	3	1	0	1	3	3	3	3	0	28
02	Gukesh D (India)	2606	0	–	3	1	3	0	3	1	3	0	1	0	3	3	3	3	27
03	Shakhriyar Mamedyarov (Azerbaijan)	2712	0	0	–	3	3	0	3	1	3	0	3	1	3	1	3	3	27
04	Arjun Erigaisi (India)	2720	1	1	0	–	3	1	0	0	3	3	3	3	3	3	0	3	27
05	Magnus Carlsen (Norway)	2902	3	0	0	0	–	1	3	3	1	3	3	1	1	3	1	3	26
06	Nodirbek Abdusattorov (Uzbekistan)	2678	1	3	3	1	1	–	3	0	1	0	3	1	3	0	3	0	23
07	Richárd Rapport (Romania)	2735	0	0	0	3	0	0	–	1	1	3	1	1	3	3	3	3	22
08	Vidit Gujrathi (India)	2691	0	1	1	3	0	3	1	–	0	3	3	1	1	0	3	1	21
09	Anish Giri (Netherlands)	2737	1	0	0	0	1	1	1	3	–	1	1	1	3	3	3	1	20
10	Vincent Keymer (Germany)	2740	3	3	3	0	0	3	0	0	1	–	0	1	1	1	0	3	19
11	David Antón Guijarro (Spain)	2706	1	1	0	0	0	0	1	0	1	3	–	1	1	3	3	1	16
12	Daniel Naroditsky (United States)	2617	0	3	1	0	1	1	1	1	1	1	1	–	0	1	1	3	16
13	Pentala Harikrishna (India)	2679	0	0	0	0	1	0	0	1	0	1	1	3	–	3	3	1	14
14	Eric Hansen (Canada)	2618	0	0	1	0	0	3	0	3	0	1	0	1	0	–	1	3	13
15	Aditya Mittal (India)	2569	0	0	0	3	1	0	0	0	0	3	0	1	0	1	–	3	12
16	Nils Grandelius (Sweden)	2632	3	0	0	0	0	3	0	1	1	0	1	0	1	0	0	–	10

===== Knockout stage =====
Quarterfinals (Oct 18)
(Poland) Jan-Krzysztof Duda	2½	–
(India) Vidit Gujrathi	½	–
(India) Arjun Erigaisi	½	–
(Norway) Magnus Carlsen	2½	–
(Azerbaijan) Shakhriyar Mamedyarov	2½	–
(Uzbekistan) Nodirbek Abdusattorov	1½	–
(India) Gukesh D	1½	–
(Romania) Richárd Rapport	2½	–

Semifinals (Oct 19)
(Poland) Jan-Krzysztof Duda	3	–
(Norway) Magnus Carlsen	1	–
(Azerbaijan) Shakhriyar Mamedyarov	2	1½
(Romania) Richárd Rapport	2	½

Final 1 (Oct 20)
(Poland) Jan-Krzysztof Duda	3	½	2
(Azerbaijan) Shakhriyar Mamedyarov	1	2½	0

==== Tour Finals ====
The Tour Finals began on the 14th November and concluded on the 20th November. Similarly to the Oslo Esports Cup, the players faced one of their 7 rivals each day over seven rounds in round-robin play. Each match consisted of 4 rapid games (15 minutes per player and a 10-second increment); if the match was tied, there was a playoff with two blitz games (5 minutes per player and a 3-second increment) and if the match was still tied, there would be a final 'Armageddon' game.

	Name	Elo	1	2	3	4	5	6	7	8	Points
1	Magnus Carlsen (Norway)	2848	–	3 (2½ : 1½)	2 (4 : 3)	3 (3 : 1)	3 (2½ : ½)	3 (2½ : ½)	3 (3 : 0)	3 (3 : 0)	20
2	Wesley So (United States)	2774	0 (1½ : 2½)	–	0 (½ : 2½)	3 (3 : 0)	3 (2½ : ½)	3 (2½ : 1½)	3 (3 : 0)	1 (3 : 4)	13
3	Lê Quang Liêm (Vietnam)	2775	1 (3 : 4)	3 (2½ : ½)	–	3 (3 : 1)	0 (½ : 2½)	0 (0 : 3)	3 (3 : 1)	1 (2½ : 3½)	11
4	Jan-Krzysztof Duda (Poland)	2798	0 (1 : 3)	0 (0 : 3)	0 (1 : 3)	–	3 (2½ : ½)	1 (3 : 4)	3 (2½ : 1½)	3 (2½ : ½)	10
5	Arjun Erigaisi (India)	2733	0 (½ : 2½)	0 (½ : 2½)	3 (2½ : ½)	0 (½ : 2½)	–	0 (1½ : 2½)	3 (3 : 1)	3 (2½ : ½)	9
6	Praggnanandhaa R (India)	2750	0 (½ : 2½)	0 (1½ : 2½)	3 (3 : 0)	2 (4 : 3)	3 (2½ : 1½)	–	0 (1½ : 2½)	1 (2½ : 3½)	9
7	Shakhriyar Mamedyarov (Azerbaijan)	2756	0 (0 : 3)	0 (0 : 3)	0 (1 : 3)	0 (1½ : 2½)	0 (1 : 3)	3 (2½ : 1½)	–	3 (2½ : ½)	6
8	Anish Giri (Netherlands)	2732	0 (0 : 3)	2 (4 : 3)	2 (3½ : 2½)	0 (½ : 2½)	0 (½ : 2½)	2 (3½ : 2½)	0 (½ : 2½)	–	6
