= Zhejiang Wenzhou High School =

Senior high school in Zhejiang, China

Coordinates: 27°57′48.38″N 120°41′3.84″E

- 浙江省温州中学
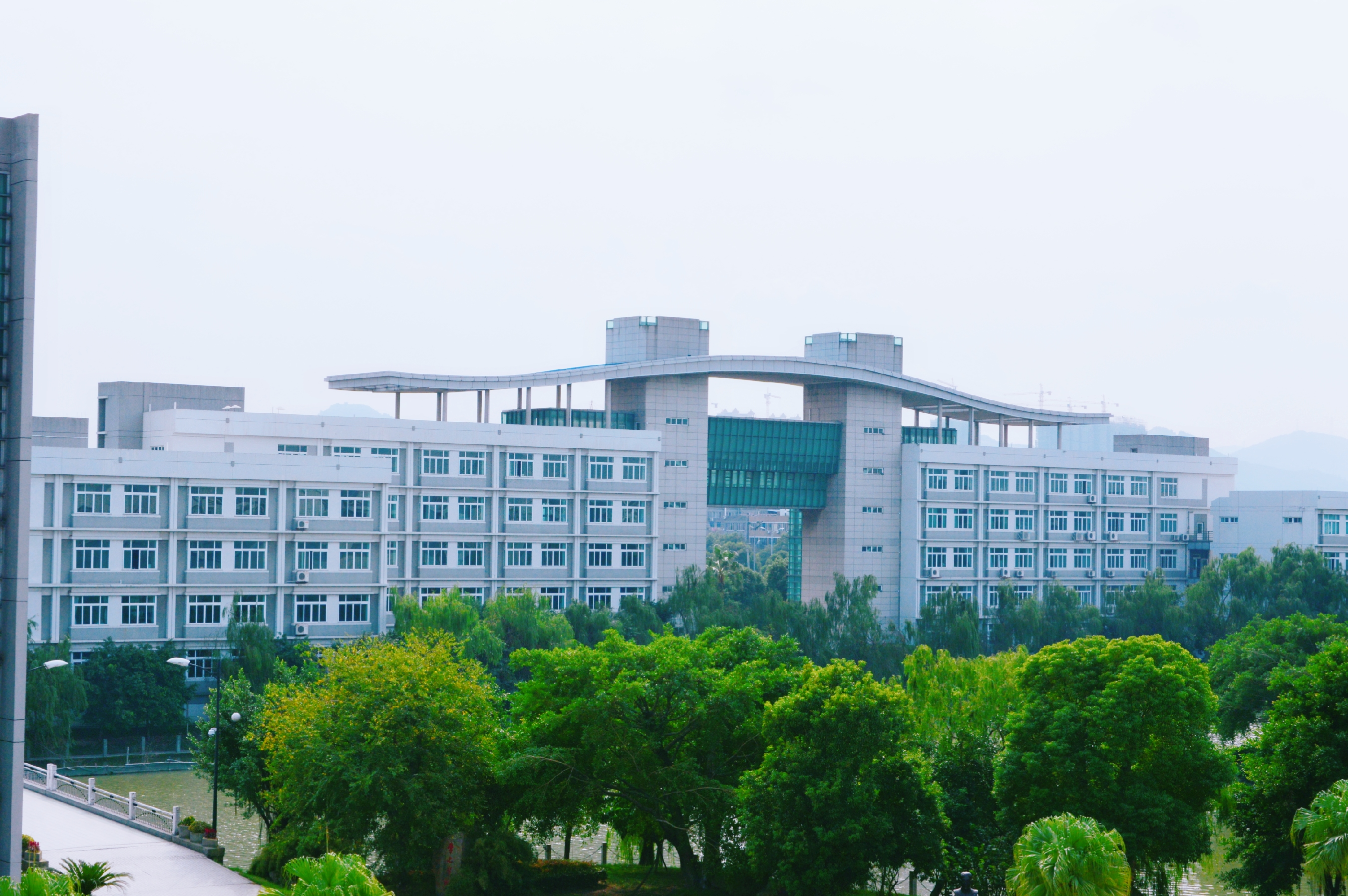
- The Administration Office
- 2 Wutian Ave, Wenzhou, Zhejiang, China; 325014

Information
- Founded: 12 October 1902
- Category: Public school
- Principal: Jian Xu
- Faculty: 227
- Gender: Coeducational
- Classes: 48
- Average class size: 40
- Area: 0.225 km^{2} (0.087 sq mi)
- National ranking: 46
- Website: wzms.wzer.net

The Zhejiang Wenzhou High School (simplified Chinese: 浙江省温州中学; traditional Chinese: 浙江省溫州中學; pinyin: zhè jiāng shěng wēn zhōu zhōng xué ), known colloquially as Wenyizhong (WZHS), is a public senior high school located in Wenzhou, Zhejiang, China. WZHS is situated in the Ouhai District of Wenzhou, within the Sanyang Wetland Scenic Area. It is one of the first provincial first-class high schools and first provincial first-class ordinary high school model schools established by the Department of Education of Zhejiang Province. Wenzhou High School is known as the "cradle of mathematicians" for educating many famous mathematicians, such as Su Buqing and Gu Chaohao. Among the best schools in China in 2015, Zhejiang Wenzhou High School is ranked 46.

== History ==
In July 1902, at the initiative of Sun Yirang, the Wenzhou government's Zhongshan Academy located in the city of Cangqiao was changed to Wenzhou Government College, which is the predecessor of Wenzhou High School. In 1906, Wenzhou Government College was renamed Wenzhou Government College of Zhejiang Province. In that year, Liu Shaokuan became the principal.

In May 1911, Wenzhou Government College of Zhejiang Province was renamed the Tenth Middle School of Zhejiang Province, and the school was still located in Cangqiao. In 1925, the Tenth Middle School of Zhejiang Province changed its name to Zhejiang Tenth Middle School, abolished the teacher training department, and set up the senior high school, junior high school and elementary school departments; two years later, the school was renamed Zhejiang Provincial Tenth Middle School again.

In August 1933, the Zhejiang Provincial Tenth Middle School was renamed Zhejiang Provincial Wenzhou High School. At this time, the domestic situation in China was chaotic, and then Sino-Japanese war broke out. Wenzhou fell three times, Wenzhou high school buildings were severely damaged and forced to move the school three times. After the war, Wenzhou High School was moved back to the city of Wenzhou.

On May 7, 1949, Wenzhou was liberated by the Chinese Communist Party, and Wenzhou High School entered a new period of development. 1953, Wenzhou High School was established as one of the 14 first-class high schools in the province, under the direct control of the Provincial Education Department. The following year, Wenzhou High School was put under the supervision of Wenzhou Municipal People's Government and renamed Wenzhou No. 1 High School of Zhejiang Province.

In 1965, the school was moved to the Jiushan River. In 1985, the school was renamed "Wenzhou High School of Zhejiang Province".

In 1995, Wenzhou High School was ranked among the provincial first-class high schools and provincial civilized schools.

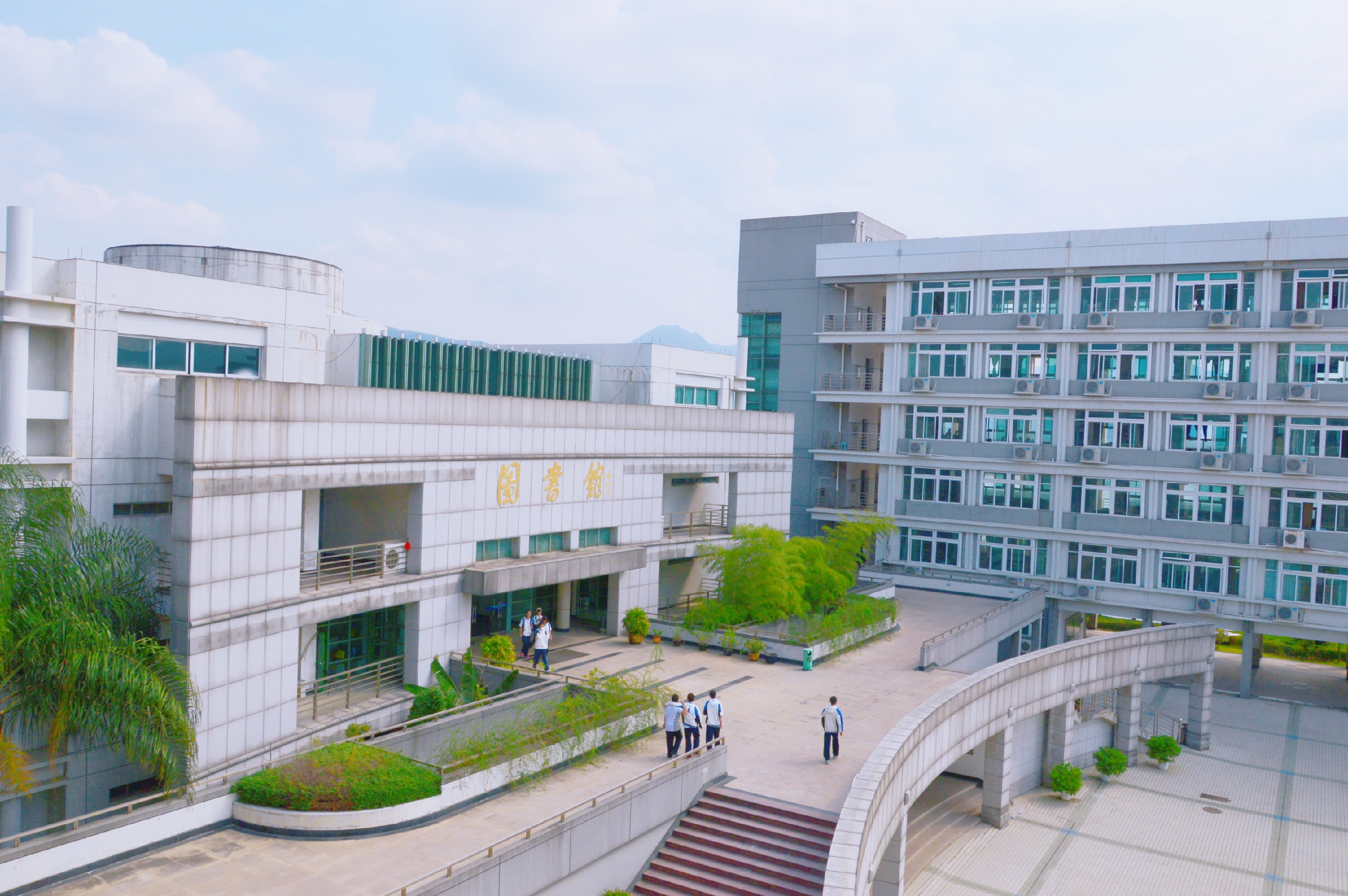
Library of the new campus

== Operations ==
By 2010, Wenzhou High School had 48 classes in WenZhou, Zhejiang Province. The school had nearly 2,400 students and 227 staff members.

Wenzhou High School covers an area of 338 acres, with a total building area of 76,700 square meters. There are several teaching buildings, a science hall, a laboratory building, a library, a gymnasium, an art building, student dormitories, a teachers' rest building, a cafeteria, an administrative office building, an English island, and a biology island. It also has a standard athletic field, tennis court and indoor solar pool. The school has built an educational information center, campus network system, CATV system, campus public broadcasting system and multimedia teaching system. The library has a total collection of 99,713 books, 225 kinds of magazines and 55 kinds of newspapers.

By 2010, Wenzhou High School had 227 teaching staff, including 4 top-grade teachers, 82 senior teachers, more than 30 provincial and municipal outstanding teachers and new teaching talents. There are 5 people in the city's "551" talent project, 12 people in the city's "221" famous teachers and principals training program, and 7 people in the provincial famous teachers and principals training program. By 2021, the number of Wenzhou high school top-grade teachers has increased to 8.

== Campus culture ==
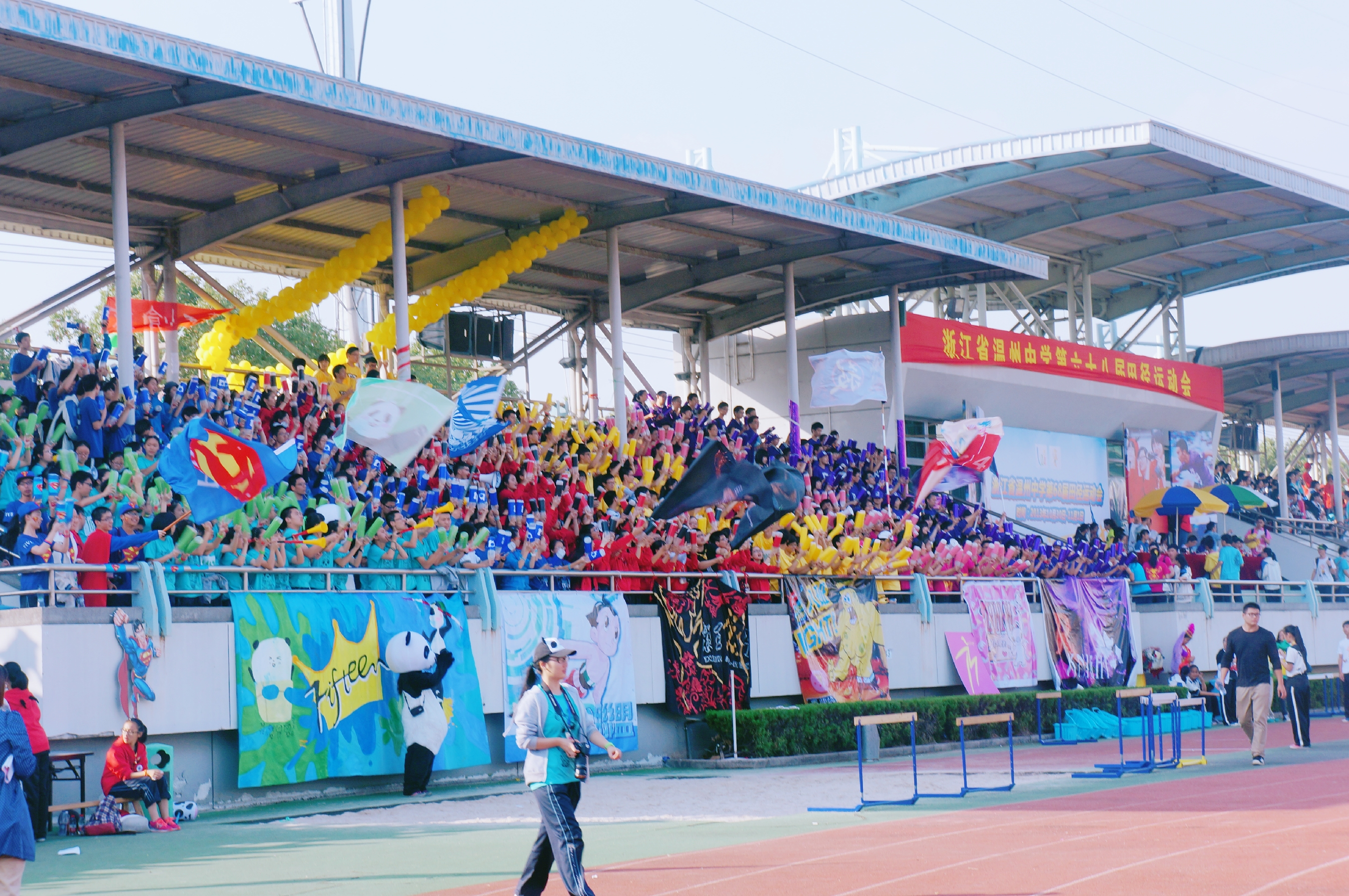
The 68th sports day

=== Argot ===
An Tui (English: burning oil in the dark; Simplified Chinese: 暗推) origins from the Wenzhounese (the dialect of Wenzhou). This argot is firstly used by a Chinese teacher of Zhejiang Wenzhou High School, referring to the phenomenon that students learn after bedtime. This action requires people to prepare a portable lamp because the school doesn't provide power during bedtime. Students would use light-shield curtains to prevent being found by housemasters. This argot means studying hard without letting others aware of the diligent.

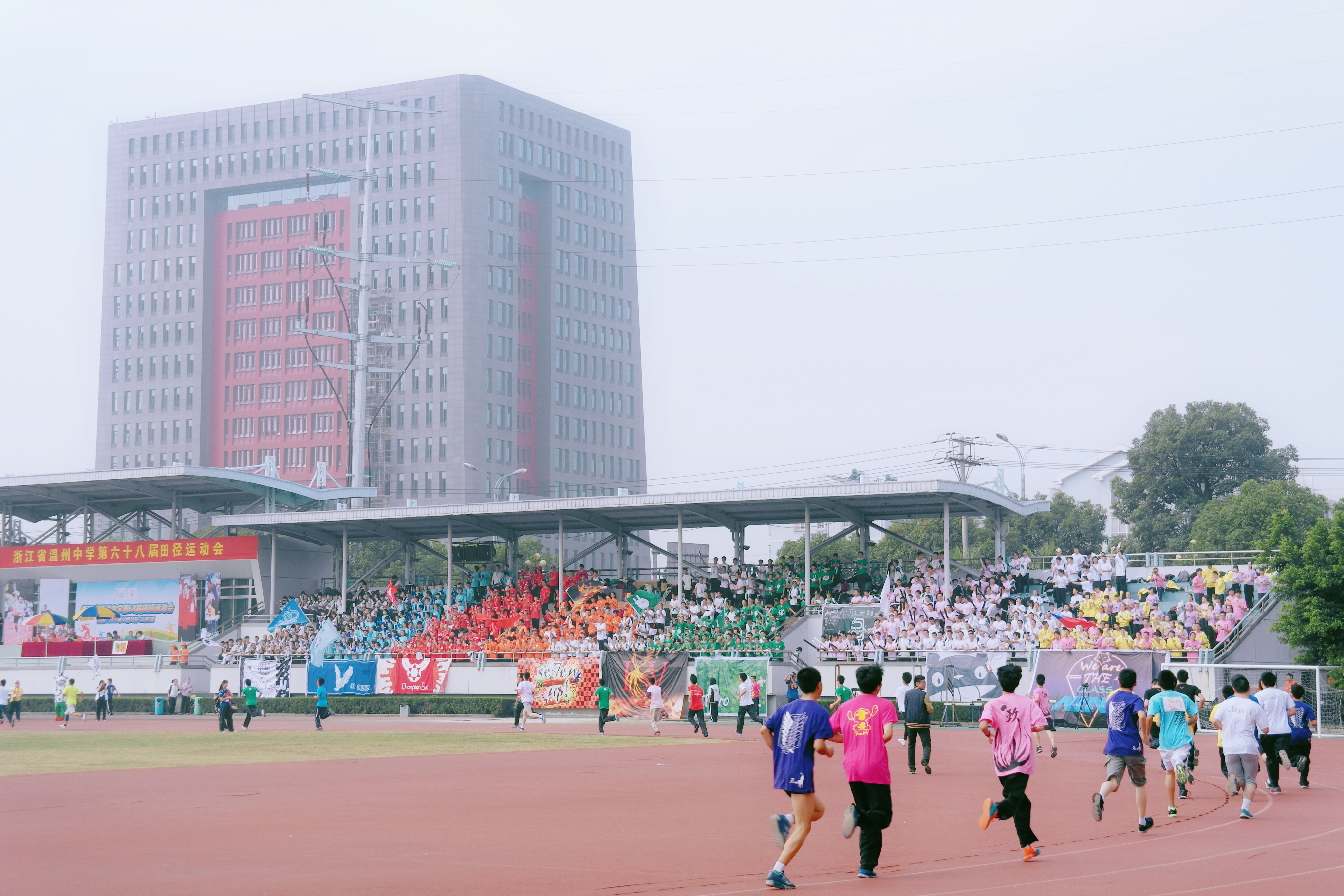
The 68th sports day

=== The sports day ===
The sports days, which often last for 3 days, contain track and field. According to tradition, every 3 classes of different grades would team up as a league to join the competition. Each league would design and buy the outfits weeks ahead of the sports day. Many leagues write their songs to cheer members up, and some even make their mascots and flags.

== Notable alumni ==
- Sun Yirang (孙怡让): philologist
- Su Buqing (苏步青): mathematician
- Gu Chaohao (谷超豪): mathematician
- Xia Nai (夏鼐): archaeologist
- Zheng Zhenduo (郑振铎): writer
- Qiu Qingquan (邱清泉): general
- Xia Chengdao (夏承焘): scholar
- Shu Shien-Siu (徐贤修): mathematician
- Chung Tao Yang (杨忠道): mathematician
- Wu Zhaohui (吴朝晖): President of Zhejiang University
- Ding Liren (丁立人): Chess grandmaster and World Chess Champion
