= Tata Steel Chess Tournament 2020 =

82nd Tata Steel Chess Tournament

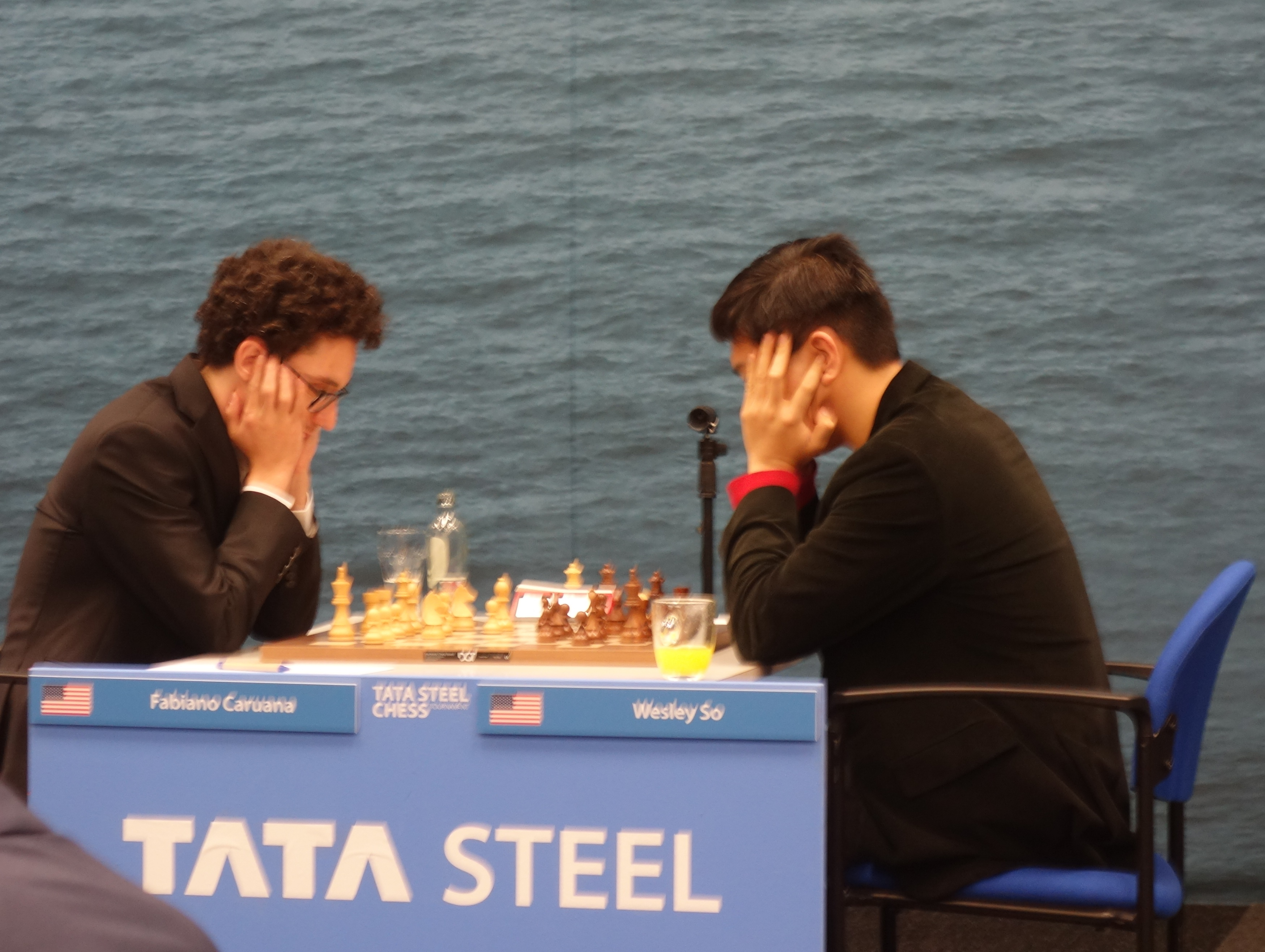
- Caruana vs. So (2020)
- Location: Wijk aan Zee, Netherlands
- Dates: 10–26 January 2020
- Competitors: 28 from 17 nations
- Winning score: 10 points of 13

Champion
- (United States) Fabiano Caruana (Masters) (Spain) David Anton Guijarro (Challengers)

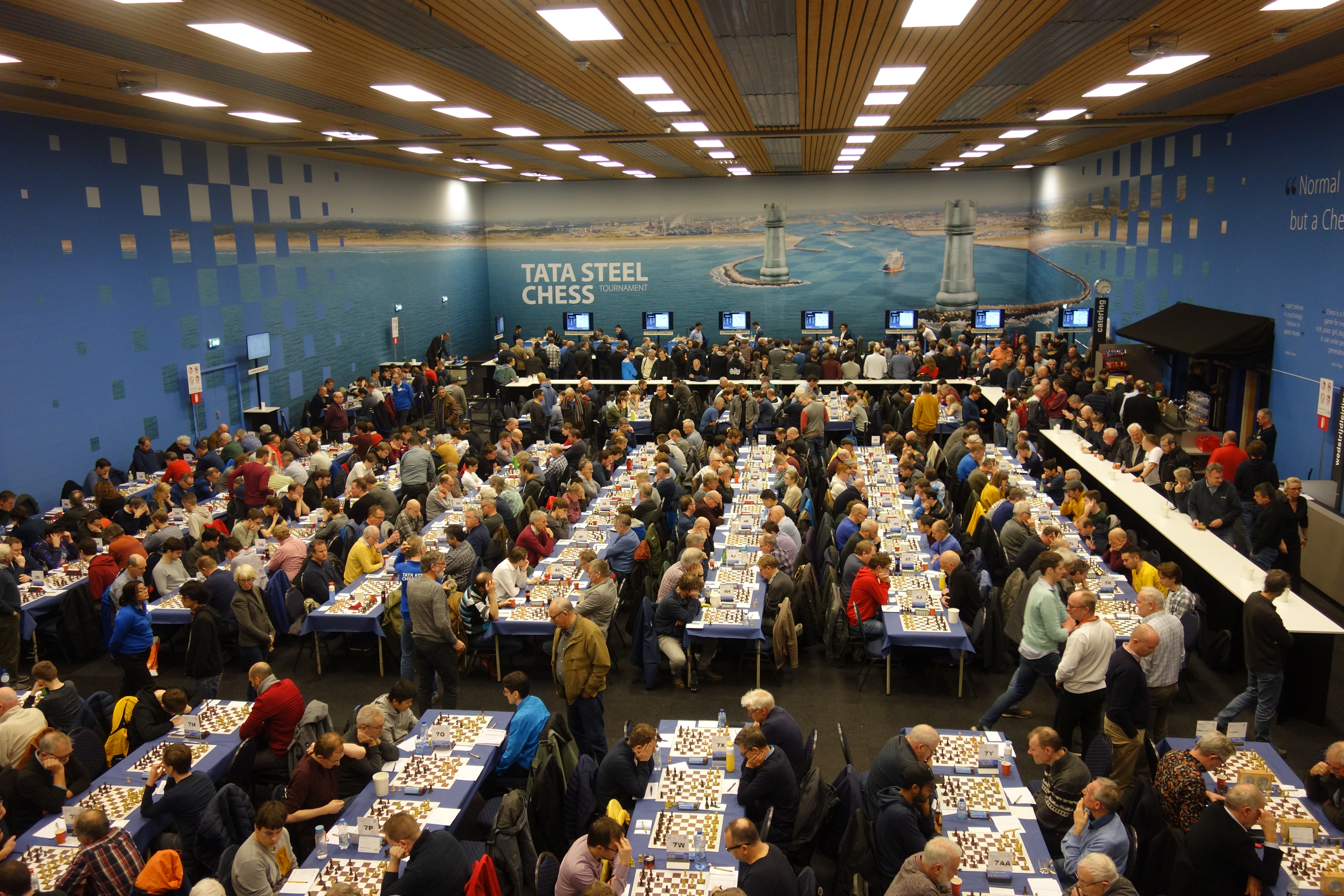
Playing hall Tata Steel Chess 2020

The Tata Steel Chess Tournament 2020 was the 82nd edition of the Tata Steel Chess Tournament. It was held in Wijk aan Zee from 10–26 January 2020. The tournament was won by Fabiano Caruana, matching Garry Kasparov's best score in 1999 and Magnus Carlsen's best score in 2013. This tournament also saw the highest ever performance rating achieved in the history of the Tata Steel Chess Tournament, with Caruana having a 2945 performance, allowing him to reach 2840+ rating for the second time of his career.

== Results ==
=== Crosstable ===
82nd Tata Steel Masters, 10–26 January 2020, Wijk aan Zee — Eindhoven, Netherlands, Category XX (2741)
	Player	Rating	1	2	3	4	5	6	7	8	9	10	11	12	13	14	Total	SB	TPR
1	Fabiano Caruana (United States)	2822		½	½	½	1	½	1	1	1	½	1	½	1	1	10		2945
2	Magnus Carlsen (Norway)	2872	½		½	½	½	½	½	½	1	½	½	1	½	1	8		2818
3	Wesley So (United States)	2765	½	½		½	½	½	1	½	1	½	½	½	½	½	7½		2796
4	Jorden van Foreest (Netherlands)	2644	½	½	½		1	½	½	½	½	0	0	1	1	½	7	44.25	2777
5	Daniil Dubov (Russia)	2683	0	½	½	0		½	½	½	½	½	1	½	1	1	7	40.75	2774
6	Anish Giri (Netherlands)	2768	½	½	½	½	½		½	½	0	½	½	½	½	1	6½	41.00	2739
7	Viswanathan Anand (India)	2758	0	½	0	½	½	½		½	1	1	½	½	½	½	6½	39.75	2739
8	Jan-Krzysztof Duda (Poland)	2758	0	½	½	½	½	½	½		½	½	½	½	1	½	6½	39.50	2739
9	Alireza Firouzja (FIDE)	2723	0	0	0	½	½	1	0	½		1	1	½	½	1	6½	37.50	2742
10	Jeffery Xiong (United States)	2712	½	½	½	1	½	½	0	½	0		1	½	½	0	6	40.50	2714
11	Vladislav Artemiev (Russia)	2731	0	½	½	1	0	½	½	½	0	0		1	½	1	6	35.75	2712
12	Nikita Vitiugov (Russia)	2747	½	0	½	0	½	½	½	½	½	½	0		½	½	5		2653
13	Yu Yangyi (China)	2726	0	½	½	0	0	½	½	0	½	½	½	½		½	4½		2632
14	Vladislav Kovalev (Belarus)	2660	0	0	½	½	0	0	½	½	0	1	0	½	½		4		2606

2020 Tata Steel Challengers, 10–26 January 2020, Wijk aan Zee, Netherlands, Category XV (2602)
	Player	Rating	1	2	3	4	5	6	7	8	9	10	11	12	13	14	Total	SB	TPR
1	GM David Antón Guijarro (Spain)	2694		½	1	½	½	½	1	½	1	1	½	0	1	½	8½		2705
2	GM Nodirbek Abdusattorov (Uzbekistan)	2635	½		½	½	½	1	½	1	½	0	½	1	1	½	8	49.75	2686
3	GM Pavel Eljanov (Ukraine)	2650	0	½		½	1	1	½	½	½	½	½	1	1	½	8	49.00	2685
4	GM Erwin l'Ami (Netherlands)	2606	½	½	½		½	½	½	½	½	½	1	½	1	1	8	48.25	2689
5	GM Surya Shekhar Ganguly (India)	2636	½	½	0	½		½	½	½	½	½	½	1	1	1	7½		2656
6	IM Vincent Keymer (Germany)	2527	½	0	0	½	½		½	½	1	1	½	½	½	1	7	41.75	2637
7	GM Nihal Sarin (India)	2618	0	½	½	½	½	½		0	½	½	1	1	½	1	7	41.25	2630
8	GM Lucas van Foreest (Netherlands)	2523	½	0	½	½	½	½	1		0	½	½	½	½	1	6½	40.00	2608
9	GM Nils Grandelius (Sweden)	2673	0	½	½	½	½	0	½	1		½	0	1	½	1	6½	38.50	2596
10	GM Jan Smeets (Netherlands)	2585	0	1	½	½	½	0	½	½	½		1	0	½	½	6	39.50	2574
11	GM Rauf Mamedov (Azerbaijan)	2659	½	½	½	0	½	½	0	½	1	0		1	½	½	6	37.50	2569
12	IM Max Warmerdam (Netherlands)	2498	1	0	0	½	0	½	0	½	0	1	0		½	½	4½	29.00	2500
13	GM Anton Smirnov (Australia)	2604	0	0	0	0	0	½	½	½	½	½	½	½		1	4½	24.75	2492
14	IM Dinara Saduakassova (Kazakhstan)	2519	½	½	½	0	0	0	0	0	0	½	½	½	0		3		2397

=== Results by round ===
Round 1, 11.01.2020
(United States) Xiong	0	½:½	0	(Russia) Dubov
(Netherlands) van Foreest	0	1:0	0	(China) Yu Yangyi
(Norway) Carlsen	0	½:½	0	(Netherlands) Giri
(United States) Caruana	0	½:½	0	(United States) So
(India) Anand	0	½:½	0	(Russia) Artemiev
(Russia) Vitiugov	0	½:½	0	(Poland) Duda
(FIDE) Firouzja	0	1:0	0	(Belarus) Kovalev
Round 4, 14.01.2020
(Russia) Dubov	1½	½:½	1½	(Poland) Duda
(Russia) Artemiev	1½	1:0	½	(Belarus) Kovalev
(United States) So	2	1:0	2½	(FIDE) Firouzja
(Netherlands) Giri	1½	½:½	1	(Russia) Vitiugov
(China) Yu Yangyi	½	½:½	1	(India) Anand
(United States) Xiong	2	½:½	2	(United States) Caruana
(Netherlands) van Foreest	2	½:½	1½	(Norway) Carlsen
Round 7, 18.01.2020
(United States) Caruana	3½	1:0	3½	(Russia) Dubov
(India) Anand	3	½:½	3	(Norway) Carlsen
(Russia) Vitiugov	2½	0:1	3½	(Netherlands) van Foreest
(FIDE) Firouzja	4	1:0	3	(United States) Xiong
(Belarus) Kovalev	1	½:½	2	(China) Yu Yangyi
(Poland) Duda	3	½:½	3	(Netherlands) Giri
(Russia) Artemiev	2½	½:½	4	(United States) So
Round 10, 22.01.2020
(Russia) Dubov	4½	½:½	4½	(Netherlands) Giri
(China) Yu Yangyi	3	½:½	5½	(United States) So
(United States) Xiong	3½	1:0	4½	(Russia) Artemiev
(Netherlands) van Foreest	5½	½:½	5	(Poland) Duda
(Norway) Carlsen	5½	1:0	3	(Belarus) Kovalev
(United States) Caruana	6	1:0	5½	(FIDE) Firouzja
(India) Anand	4	½:½	3	(Russia) Vitiugov

Round 2, 12.01.2020
(Russia) Dubov	½	1:0	0	(Belarus) Kovalev
(Poland) Duda	½	½:½	1	(FIDE) Firouzja
(Russia) Artemiev	½	1:0	½	(Russia) Vitiugov
(United States) So	½	1:0	½	(India) Anand
(Netherlands) Giri	½	½:½	½	(United States) Caruana
(China) Yu Yangyi	0	½:½	½	(Norway) Carlsen
(United States) Xiong	½	1:0	1	(Netherlands) van Foreest
Round 5, 16.01.2020
(Norway) Carlsen	2	½:½	2	(Russia) Dubov
(United States) Caruana	2½	½:½	2½	(Netherlands) van Foreest
(India) Anand	1½	1:0	2½	(United States) Xiong
(Russia) Vitiugov	1½	½:½	1	(China) Yu Yangyi
(FIDE) Firouzja	2½	1:0	2	(Netherlands) Giri
(Belarus) Kovalev	½	½:½	3	(United States) So
(Poland) Duda	2	½:½	2½	(Russia) Artemiev
Round 8, 19.01.2020
(Russia) Dubov	3½	½:½	4½	(United States) So
(Netherlands) Giri	3½	½:½	3½	(Russia) Artemiev
(China) Yu Yangyi	2½	0:1	3½	(Poland) Duda
(United States) Xiong	3	0:1	1½	(Belarus) Kovalev
(Netherlands) van Foreest	4½	½:½	5	(FIDE) Firouzja
(Norway) Carlsen	3½	1:0	2½	(Russia) Vitiugov
(United States) Caruana	4½	1:0	3½	(India) Anand
Round 11, 24.01.2020
(Russia) Vitiugov	3½	½:½	5	(Russia) Dubov
(FIDE) Firouzja	5½	0:1	4½	(India) Anand
(Belarus) Kovalev	3	0:1	7	(United States) Caruana
(Poland) Duda	5½	½:½	6½	(Norway) Carlsen
(Russia) Artemiev	4½	1:0	6	(Netherlands) van Foreest
(United States) So	6	½:½	4½	(United States) Xiong
(Netherlands) Giri	5	½:½	3½	(China) Yu Yangyi
Round 13, 26.01.2020
(FIDE) Firouzja	6	½:½	6½	(Russia) Dubov
(Belarus) Kovalev	3½	½:½	4½	(Russia) Vitiugov
(Poland) Duda	6	½:½	6	(India) Anand
(Russia) Artemiev	6	0:1	9	(United States) Caruana
(United States) So	7	½:½	7½	(Norway) Carlsen
(Netherlands) Giri	6	½:½	6½	(Netherlands) van Foreest
(China) Yu Yangyi	4	½:½	5½	(United States) Xiong

Round 3, 13.01.2020
(Netherlands) van Foreest	1	1:0	1½	(Russia) Dubov
(Norway) Carlsen	1	½:½	1½	(United States) Xiong
(United States) Caruana	1	1:0	½	(China) Yu Yangyi
(India) Anand	½	½:½	1	(Netherlands) Giri
(Russia) Vitiugov	½	½:½	1½	(United States) So
(FIDE) Firouzja	1½	1:0	1½	(Russia) Artemiev
(Belarus) Kovalev	0	½:½	1	(Poland) Duda
Round 6, 17.01.2020
(Russia) Dubov	2½	1:0	3	(Russia) Artemiev
(United States) So	3½	½:½	2½	(Poland) Duda
(Netherlands) Giri	2	1:0	1	(Belarus) Kovalev
(China) Yu Yangyi	1½	½:½	3½	(FIDE) Firouzja
(United States) Xiong	2½	½:½	2	(Russia) Vitiugov
(Netherlands) van Foreest	3	½:½	2½	(India) Anand
(Norway) Carlsen	2½	½:½	3	(United States) Caruana
Round 9, 21.01.2020
(India) Anand	3½	½:½	4	(Russia) Dubov
(Russia) Vitiugov	2½	½:½	5½	(United States) Caruana
(FIDE) Firouzja	5½	0:1	4½	(Norway) Carlsen
(Belarus) Kovalev	2½	½:½	5	(Netherlands) van Foreest
(Poland) Duda	4½	½:½	3	(United States) Xiong
(Russia) Artemiev	4	½:½	2½	(China) Yu Yangyi
(United States) So	5	½:½	4	(Netherlands) Giri
Round 12, 25.01.2020
(Russia) Dubov	5½	1:0	4	(China) Yu Yangyi
(United States) Xiong	5	½:½	5½	(Netherlands) Giri
(Netherlands) van Foreest	6	½:½	6½	(United States) So
(Norway) Carlsen	7	½:½	5½	(Russia) Artemiev
(United States) Caruana	8	1:0	6	(Poland) Duda
(India) Anand	5½	½:½	3	(Belarus) Kovalev
(Russia) Vitiugov	4	½:½	5½	(FIDE) Firouzja
