= Aditya Mittal (chess player) =

Indian chess grandmaster (born 2006)

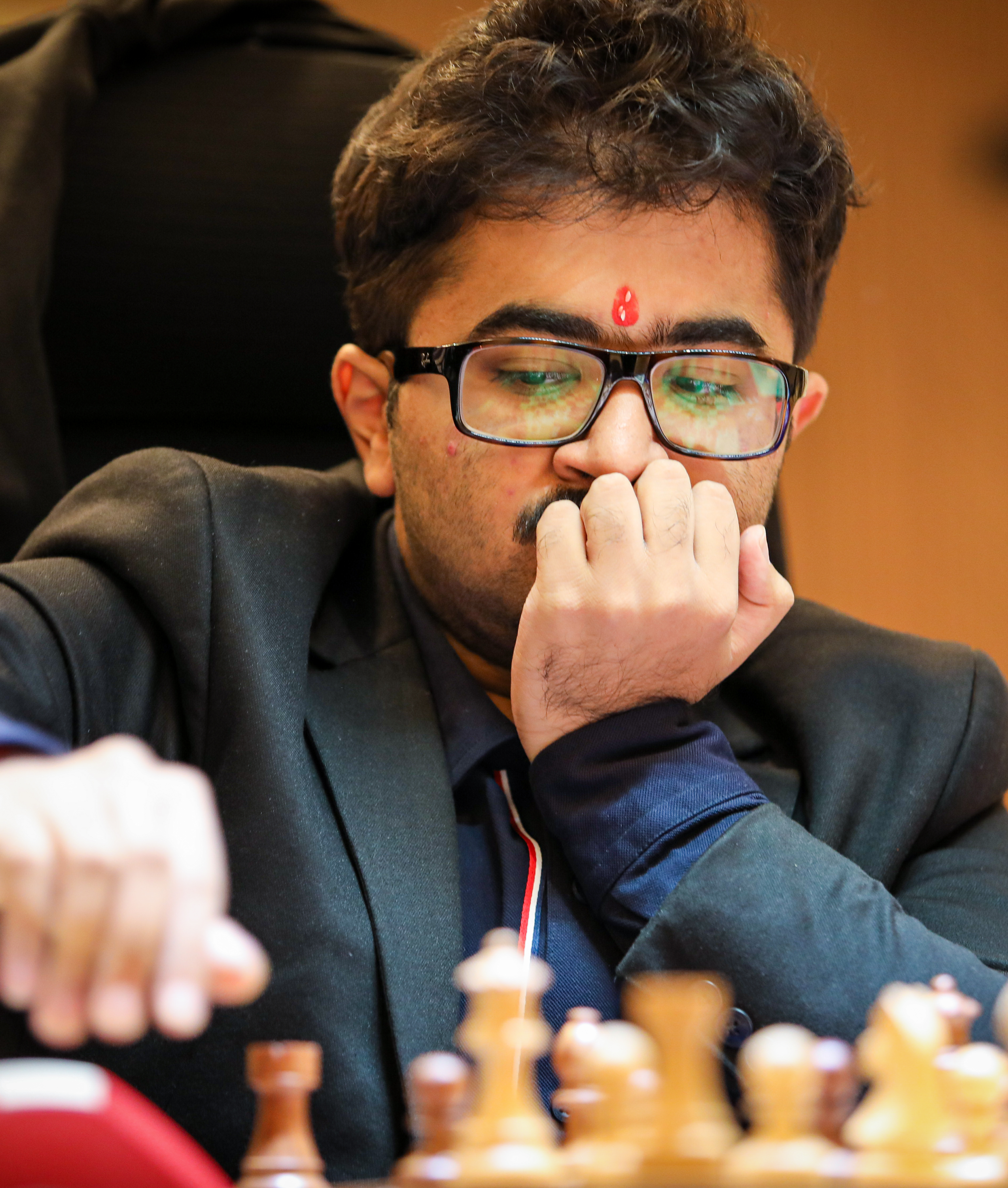
- Aditya in 2026

Personal information
- Born: 19 September 2006 (age 19) Medhauli, Madhya Pradesh, India

Chess career
- Country: India
- Title: Grandmaster (2023)
- FIDE rating: 2602 (July 2026)
- Peak rating: 2624 (October 2025)

Aditya Mittal is an Indian chess grandmaster.

== Chess career ==
Aditya began playing chess at five years old.

Aditya played in the Aimchess Rapid tournament of the Champions Chess Tour 2022, where he managed to score wins against Arjun Erigaisi, Vincent Keymer, and Nils Grandelius.

In December 2022, Aditya became India's 77th grandmaster by drawing against Francisco Vallejo Pons during the Ellobregat Open tournament in Catalonia, which caused his live rating to surpass 2500.

He was awarded the title of Grandmaster in January 2023. In July 2023, Aditya won the Astana Zhuldyzdary Open tournament, finishing ahead of Alexander Moiseenko, Evgeny Alekseev, and Ramazan Zhalmakhanov.
