= Patrick Kawuma =

Ugandan chess player (born 1990)

Personal information
- Born: January 9, 1990 (age 36)

Chess career
- Country: Uganda
- Title: FIDE Master (2015)
- Peak rating: 2362 (June 2021)

Patrick Kawuma (born January 9, 1990) is a Ugandan chess player who holds the title of FIDE Master. He has represented Uganda in national and international chess competitions and is regarded as one of the country's leading chess players.

== Chess career ==
Kawuma was awarded the title of Candidate Master in 2010 and later earned the FIDE Master title, reflecting his strong performance and sustained competitive results.

He has competed in many local and international tournaments, including the Rwabushenyi Memorial Championship. Kawuma won the 2023 Uganda Open, scoring 7.5 points out of eight rounds in a strong field, a performance widely noted in the national chess community. Kawuma has also competed in Chess Olympiads for Uganda, representing the national team on the global stage in events such as the 44th Chess Olympiad. The 44th Chess Olympiad took place in Chennai, India, from July 28 to August 10, 2022. His games from the Olympiad and other competitions are archived in international chess databases.

In 2022 national qualifiers, Kawuma topped the roster to help lead Uganda's Olympiad-bound team alongside fellow players, highlighting his role in national team selection.

== Playing style ==
Kawuma is known for a versatile opening repertoire, with frequent use of English opening patterns and solid positional play across rapid, blitz, and classical formats.
