= Jan-Krzysztof Duda =

Polish chess grandmaster (born 1998)

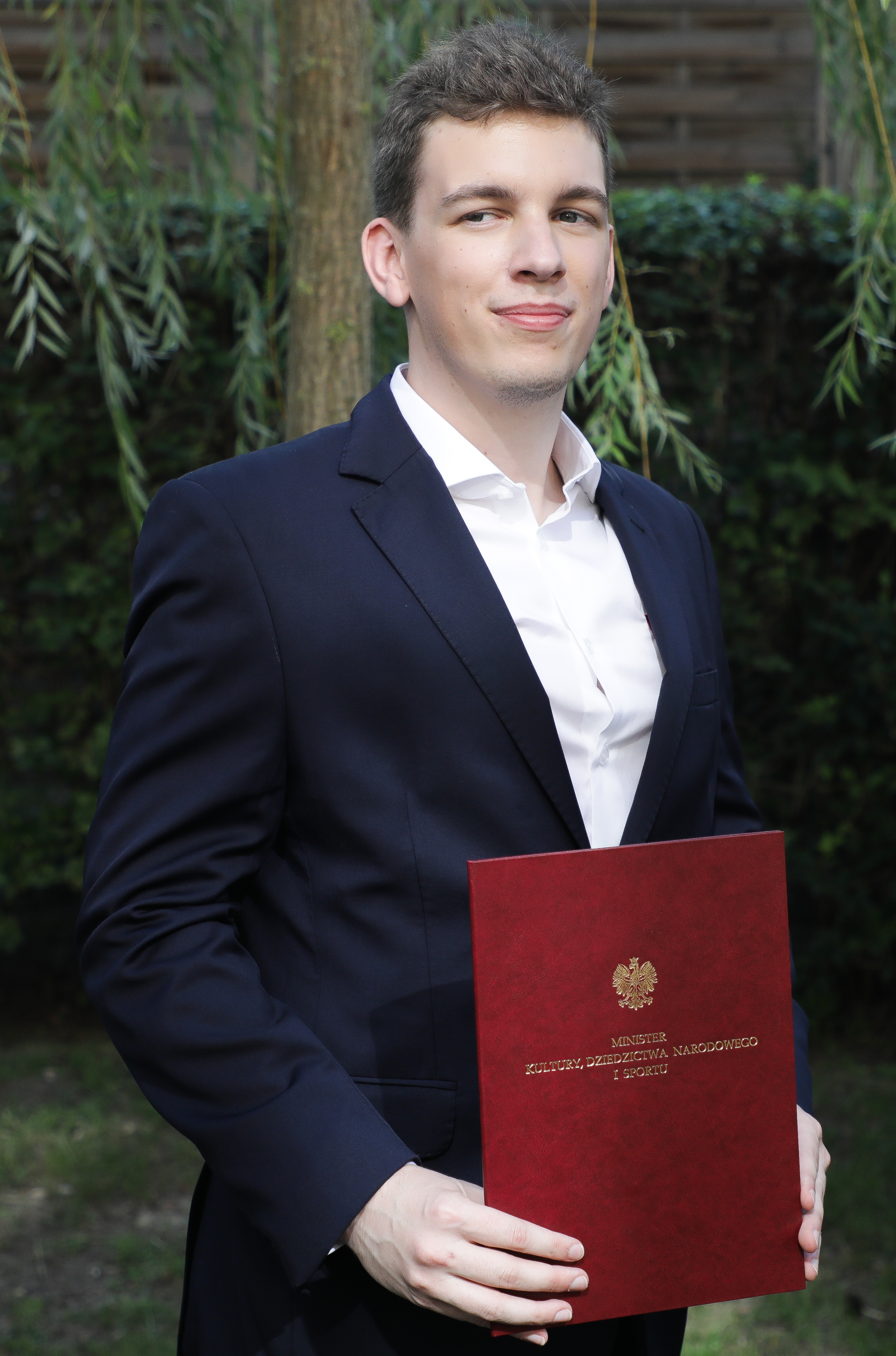
- Duda in 2021

Personal information
- Born: 26 April 1998 (age 28) Kraków, Poland

Chess career
- Country: Poland
- Title: Grandmaster (2013)
- FIDE rating: 2741 (November 2026)
- Peak rating: 2760 (December 2021)
- Ranking: No. 13 (November 2026)
- Peak ranking: No. 12 (December 2019)

Jan-Krzysztof Duda (Polish: [ˈjan ˌkʂɨʂtɔf ˈduda]; born 26 April 1998) is a Polish chess grandmaster. A prodigy, he achieved the grandmaster title in 2013 at the age of 15 years and 21 days. As of December 2025, he is ranked No. 1 in Poland and No. 21 in the world. His personal best rating of 2760 makes him the highest ranked Polish player of all time.

Duda won the Polish Championship in 2018 and the Chess World Cup in 2021. He is a bronze medallist at the European Team Chess Championship in 2021 and he also competed in the Candidates Tournament 2022 finishing seventh. He was awarded the Golden Cross of Merit for his achievements in chess.

== Chess career ==
=== 2007–2008 ===
In 2007, Duda placed first in the U8 Polish Youth Championship chess tournament.

In 2008, Duda won the World Youth Chess Championship in the under-10 category and as a result he was awarded the title of FIDE Master. The same year, he also won the U8 Polish Youth Championship tournament for the second time.

=== 2012 ===
In 2012, Duda won the Polish under-18 championship in Solina and the European Youth Chess Championship in the under-14 category in Prague. In the same year, he tied for first with Jan Krejčí in the Olomouc Chess Summer tournament and was awarded the title of International Master.

=== 2013–2014 ===
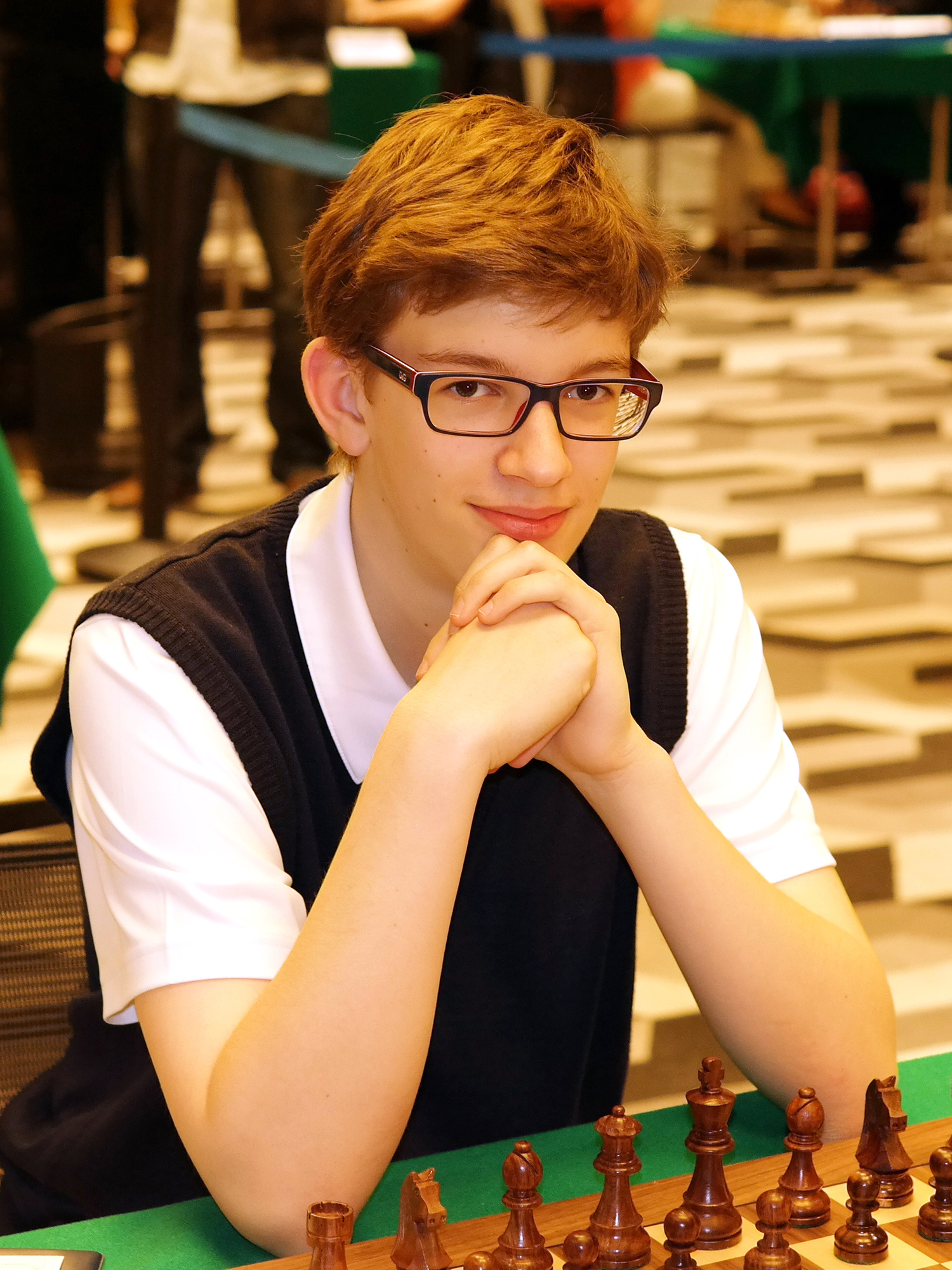
Duda in 2014

In May 2013, Duda achieved his final norm required for the title of Grandmaster, in the European Individual Championship, at the age of 15 years and 21 days. This made him the second youngest grandmaster in the world at the time. Duda also thus became the second youngest Polish grandmaster ever, after Dariusz Świercz. In April 2013, he came first in the First Saturday GM tournament in Budapest. In August, Duda took part as a FIDE presidential nominee in the FIDE World Cup, where he was eliminated in the first round by Vassily Ivanchuk. In October, FIDE officially awarded him the title of Grandmaster. In August 2014, Duda played for the Polish team at the 41st Chess Olympiad in Tromsø, Norway, scoring 8.5/11 on board three. In December 2014, he won the European Rapid Chess Championship and took silver in the European Blitz Chess Championship, both held in Wrocław, Poland.

=== 2015–2016 ===
In July 2015, Duda won the Lake Sevan round-robin tournament in Martuni, Armenia. In September 2015, he finished equal first with Mikhail Antipov in the World Junior Chess Championship in Khanty-Mansiysk, Russia, and received a silver medal after tiebreaks. In 2016, he was awarded by the President of Poland Andrzej Duda (not related) the Silver Cross of Merit for his "great sports achievements in 2016 as well as contributions to popularizing the game of chess".

=== 2017–2018 ===
On 1 July 2017, Duda became the first Polish junior player to break the 2700 barrier in FIDE rating, achieving the highest ranking in his chess career so far. With a rating of 2707, he was the second highest ranked Polish player and 41st in the world at the time.

In May 2018, Duda won the Polish Chess Championship with a score of 6½/9 (+4–0=5), a full point ahead of runner-up Kacper Piorun. He recorded victories over Piorun, Radosław Wojtaszek, Daniel Sadzikowski, and Aleksander Miśta. In July 2018, he became the No. 1 ranked Polish player and the No. 1 ranked junior in the world, outstripping Wojtaszek and Wei Yi, respectively.

In July 2018, Duda competed in the 46th Dortmund Sparkassen Chess Meeting, placing fourth with a score of 4/7 (+2–1=4).

During the 2018 Chess Olympiad held in Batumi, Georgia, he defeated Vassily Ivanchuk and drew against Levon Aronian, Viswanathan Anand, Fabiano Caruana, Shakhriyar Mamedyarov and Sergey Karjakin, claiming fourth place overall with the Polish team. In 2018, Duda reached the semi-finals of the Speed Chess Championship after beating Karjakin and Alexander Grischuk, eventually losing to Wesley So.

In December 2018, Duda finished in second place in the World Blitz Chess Championship in Saint Petersburg, scoring 16½/21 (+15–3=3), half a point behind the winner Magnus Carlsen.

=== 2019–2020 ===
In January 2019, he became the first ever Polish chess player to exceed 2800 barrier in the blitz category. In November 2019, Duda participated in the Hamburg FIDE Grand Prix tournament, which is part of the qualification cycle for the World Chess Championship 2020. The tournament was a 16-player event. On 13 November, Duda reached the finals losing to Alexander Grischuk during the tie-breaks.

In January 2020, Duda participated in 2020 Tata Steel Chess Tournament and finished the tournament in 8th place with a score of 6½/13 (+1-1=11), which is the same score as former Chess World Champion Viswanathan Anand, and Alireza Firouzja.

In May 2020, he achieved his first victory over the reigning Chess World Champion Magnus Carlsen by beating him in Round 7 of the Lindores Abbey Rapid Chess Challenge, with the game entering an English Opening (King's English Variation, Four Knights Variation, Quiet Line).

On 10 October 2020, he again defeated Magnus Carlsen (in a Caro–Kann Defence, Tartakower Variation) at the Altibox Norway Chess tournament held in Stavanger. It was Carlsen's first defeat after a 125-game unbeaten streak in classical chess. At the FIDE Online Chess Olympiad 2020, he won bronze medal after the Polish team reached the semi-finals of the tournament and lost in a match-deciding tie-break 1-2 against India.

=== 2021–2023 ===
At the 2021 European Team Chess Championship, he won bronze medal with the Polish team, which also included Radosław Wojtaszek, Kacper Piorun, Wojciech Moranda and Paweł Teclaf. In July–August 2021, Duda competed in the Chess World Cup 2021. In round five, Duda defeated the Russian GM Alexander Grischuk in the rapid tiebreaker after drawing the classical games. He then knocked out Vidit Gujrathi in the quarterfinals and eliminated the World Chess Champion Magnus Carlsen in the tiebreaker of the semifinals to qualify for the 2022 Candidates Tournament. He went on to win the Chess World Cup by beating former World Cup winner Sergey Karjakin in the finals with a score of 1.5-0.5.

In December, he won the European Blitz Chess Championship held in Katowice, Poland. At the 2021 World Rapid Chess Championship held at the National Stadium in Warsaw, Poland, he finished fifth while at the jointly-held 2021 World Blitz Chess Championship he finished second behind only Maxime Vachier-Lagrave. From the perspective of the sum of the scores of these two championships in the same event, he was the player with the highest score: 24 points.

In April 2022, Duda won the Oslo Esports Cup ahead of Magnus Carlsen, Anish Giri, and Shakhriyar Mamedyarov.

In May 2022, he won the Superbet Rapid & Blitz tournament (hosted in Warsaw as part of the 2022 Grand Chess Tour) with a convincing four-point lead ahead of Levon Aronian and Viswanathan Anand.

In July 2022, he finished in the seventh place at the Candidates Tournament 2022.

In October, he won the Aimchess Rapid, his second win of the year as part of Champions Chess Tour, ahead of Shakhriyar Mamedyarov.

In 2023, he reached the fifth round at the 2023 Chess World Cup where he lost to Fabiano Caruana.

In 2024, he was part of Gukesh Dommaraju's team for the World Chess Championship 2024.

=== 2025 ===
In Superbet Rapid & Blitz Poland, he was tied 7th scoring 17 points.

== Political views ==
In December 2023, Duda participated at the World Rapid Chess Championship in Samarkand, Uzbekistan. He caused controversy at the event for refusing to shake hands with Russian chess grandmaster Denis Khismatullin before their game in round one. The decision was motivated by his opposition to Khismatullin's vocal support of the Russian invasion of Ukraine. Duda risked disqualification because refusing a handshake in chess can be interpreted as an insult; however, Khismatullin did not file any official complaint and further released a statement in which he wrote that he respected Duda's right to his opinion.

== Personal life ==
Duda graduated from the University School of Physical Education in Kraków in 2020. He enjoys listening to Beethoven, Mozart, and Queen. Duda plays Age of Empires II: Definitive Edition.

== See also ==
- List of Polish chess players
