= World Blitz Chess Championship 2022 =

Global chess tournament

- Almaty, Kazakhstan
- 29–30 December 2022
	World Blitz Champion	Women's; World Blitz Champion
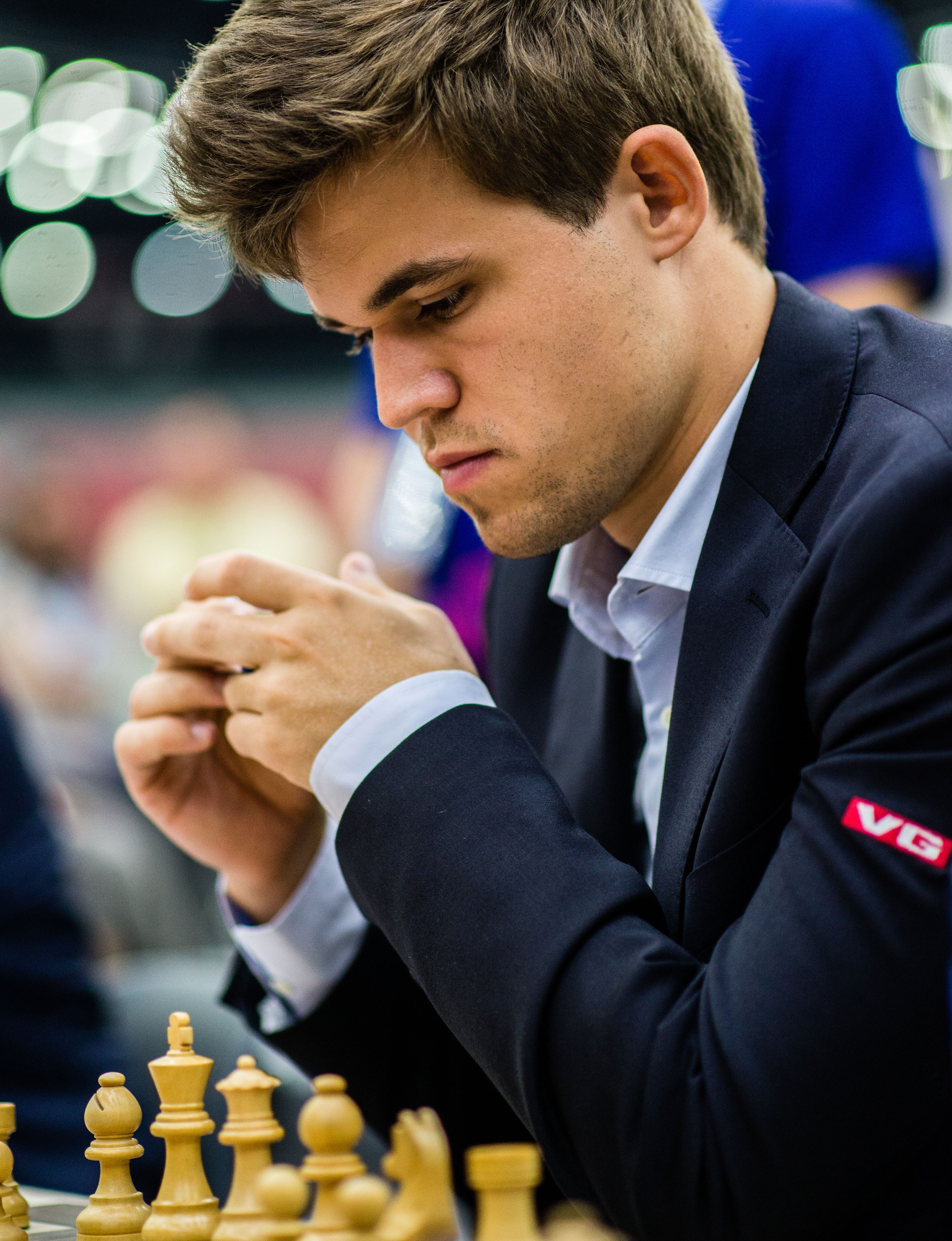
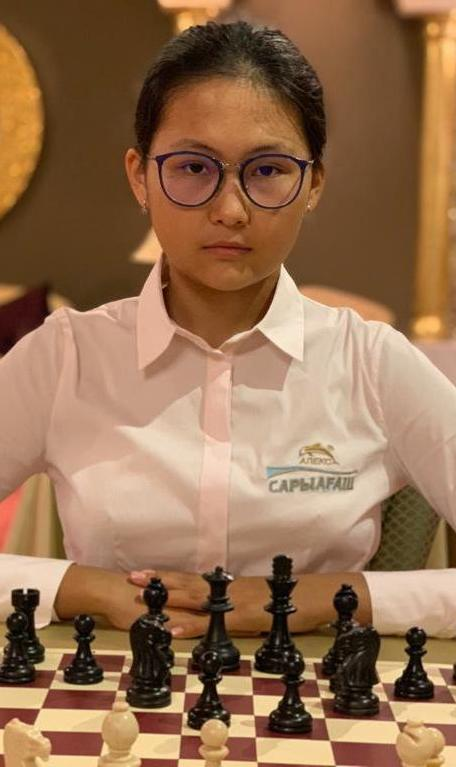
	(Norway) Magnus Carlsen	(Kazakhstan) Bibisara Assaubayeva
16/21	Scores	13/17

The 2022 World Blitz Chess Championship was an annual chess tournament held by FIDE to determine the world champion in chess played under blitz time controls. Since 2012, FIDE has held the World Rapid and Blitz Championships at a joint tournament. The tournament was held in Almaty, Kazakhstan, from 29 to 30 December 2022, using a Swiss-system with 21 rounds for the open tournament and 17 rounds for the women's tournament.

== Participants ==
176 players took part in the open tournament and 99 in the women's tournament.

Code	Federation	Open	Women's	Total
ARM	Armenia	10	4	14
AUT	Austria	2	0	2
AZE	Azerbaijan	7	6	13
BEL	Belgium	1	0	1
BRA	Brazil	0	1	1
BUL	Bulgaria	2	1	3
CAN	Canada	2	0	2
CHN	China	1	2	3
CZE	(Czech Republic) Czechia	1	1	2
EGY	Egypt	2	0	2
ENG	England	1	1	2
EST	Estonia	1	0	1
FRA	France	3	0	3
GEO	(Georgia (country)) Georgia	3	7	10
GER	Germany	5	2	7
HKG	Hong Kong	1	0	1
IND	India	15	5	20
IRI	Iran	5	1	6
ISR	Israel	1	0	1
ITA	Italy	1	0	1
KAZ	Kazakhstan	20	22	42
KGZ	Kyrgyzstan	3	1	4
KOS	Kosovo	2	0	2
LBA	Libya	1	0	1
MAS	Malaysia	0	1	1
MDA	Moldova	1	0	1
MNE	Montenegro	1	0	1
MGL	Mongolia	4	5	9
NED	Netherlands	2	0	2
NZL	New Zealand	1	0	1
NOR	Norway	4	1	5
PHI	Philippines	0	1	1
POL	Poland	1	1	2
ROU	Romania	1	0	1
SRB	Serbia	3	2	5
SIN	Singapore	1	1	2
ESP	Spain	3	0	3
TJK	Tajikistan	1	0	1
TUR	Turkey	3	1	4
UKR	Ukraine	1	5	6
UAE	United Arab Emirates	1	0	1
USA	United States	7	4	11
UZB	Uzbekistan (host)	8	3	11
VIE	Vietnam	1	0	1
WAL	Wales	1	0	1
FID	(FIDE) none	41	20	61

== Tiebreak regulations ==
For players who finish on the same score, final position was determined by the following tie-breaks, in order:

1. Buchholz Cut 1
2. Buchholz
3. Average Rating of Opponents Cut 1 (average rating of opponents excluding the lowest rated opponent)
4. Results of individual games between tied players
5. Drawing of lots

If two or more players are tied for any position other than first, the above-mentioned tiebreak system shall decide the ranking of the tied players. If there is a tie for the 1st place, a play-off shall be played among all players in the tie to determine the new champion.

== Open tournament results ==
The following table lists all participants, with the results from the 21 rounds. They are ranked according to the results, taking into account the tie-breaks.

Notation: "1 (B 102)" indicates a win (1 point) with black pieces (B) against player who finished in 102nd place.

Rank	Name	Rating	1	2	3	4	5	6	7	8	9	10	11	12	13	14	15	16	17	18	19	20	21	Total	BC1	BS	AROC1
1	(Norway) Magnus Carlsen	2830	1 (B 102)	1 (W 56)	1 (B 68)	1 (W 70)	1 (B 5)	½ (W 23)	1 (B 4)	½ (B 2)	½ (W 8)	½ (W 67)	½ (B 6)	½ (B 10)	1 (W 3)	1 (W 9)	0 (B 12)	1 (W 13)	1 (B 15)	1 (W 40)	0 (B 7)	1 (B 24)	1 (W 19)	16	264	274	2721
2	(United States) Hikaru Nakamura	2909	1 (B 39)	1 (W 81)	1 (B 32)	1 (W 18)	½ (B 4)	1 (W 15)	1 (B 23)	½ (W 1)	½ (B 6)	½ (W 5)	1 (B 3)	1 (W 8)	½ (B 9)	½ (B 12)	0 (W 10)	1 (W 30)	1 (B 11)	0 (B 7)	½ (W 24)	1 (B 13)	½ (W 17)	15	272½	283	2726
3	(Armenia) Haik M. Martirosyan	2745	0 (B 72)	1 (W 97)	1 (B 39)	1 (W 119)	1 (B 38)	0 (W 4)	1 (B 37)	1 (W 115)	1 (B 85)	1 (W 83)	0 (W 2)	1 (B 16)	0 (B 1)	1 (W 13)	1 (B 6)	1 (W 8)	½ (B 12)	½ (W 10)	0 (B 5)	1 (W 7)	1 (W 15)	15	258	267½	2677
4	(Netherlands) Anish Giri	2792	1 (B 134)	1 (W 51)	1 (B 53)	1 (W 24)	½ (W 2)	1 (B 3)	0 (W 1)	1 (B 16)	½ (W 67)	½ (B 8)	½ (W 9)	1 (B 5)	½ (B 6)	1 (W 11)	½ (B 17)	½ (W 12)	½ (W 10)	½ (B 18)	½ (W 13)	½ (B 15)	1 (W 34)	14½	268	277	2711
5	(Poland) Jan-Krzysztof Duda	2773	1 (B 54)	1 (W 60)	1 (B 65)	1 (W 58)	0 (W 1)	½ (B 68)	1 (B 69)	1 (W 27)	½ (W 10)	½ (B 2)	½ (B 67)	0 (W 4)	1 (W 24)	1 (B 25)	½ (B 8)	0 (W 6)	1 (B 17)	1 (W 12)	1 (W 3)	1 (B 11)	0 (W 7)	14½	262½	273½	2698
6	(FIDE) Daniil Dubov	2792	½ (W 100)	½ (B 115)	1 (W 97)	1 (W 85)	1 (B 24)	1 (W 33)	1 (B 83)	½ (B 8)	½ (W 2)	1 (B 129)	½ (W 1)	½ (B 29)	½ (W 4)	1 (B 10)	0 (W 3)	1 (B 5)	0 (W 7)	1 (B 55)	½ (W 11)	½ (W 9)	1 (B 12)	14½	258	267	2692
7	(FIDE) Alexey Sarana	2708																	1 (B 6)	1 (W 2)	1 (W 1)	0 (B 3)	1 (B 5)	14½	234½	242	2599
8	(FIDE) Vladimir Fedoseev	2733								½ (W 6)	½ (B 1)	½ (W 4)		0 (B 2)			½ (W 5)	0 (B 3)						14	256½	265½	2688
9	(Romania) Richárd Rapport	2654											½ (B 4)		½ (W 2)	0 (B 1)						½ (B 6)		14	247	255½	2644
10	(FIDE) Vladislav Artemiev	2803									½ (B 5)			½ (W 1)		0 (W 6)	1 (B 2)		½ (B 4)	½ (B 3)				13½	260½	270	2690
11	(FIDE) Dmitry Andreikin	2735														0 (B 4)			0 (W 2)		½ (B 6)	0 (W 5)		13½	251½	261	2637
12	(FIDE) Ian Nepomniachtchi	2782														½ (B 2)	1 (W 1)	½ (B 4)	½ (W 3)	0 (B 5)			0 (W 6)	13½	250½	259½	2676
13	(Germany) Vincent Keymer	2600														0 (B 3)		0 (B 1)			½ (B 4)	0 (W 2)		13½	248½	257	2693
14	(United Arab Emirates) Salem Saleh	2633																						13½	222	230½	2555
15	(United States) Fabiano Caruana	2847						0 (B 2)											0 (W 1)			½ (W 4)	0 (B 3)	13	250½	259½	2643
16	(FIDE) Denis Lazavik	2484								0 (W 4)				0 (W 3)										13	248	257	2694
17	(India) Pentala Harikrishna	2617															½ (W 4)		0 (W 5)				½ (B 2)	13	242	250	2601
18	(India) Nihal Sarin	2702				0 (B 2)														½ (W 4)				13	239½	248½	2606
19	(Uzbekistan) Nodirbek Abdusattorov	2666																					0 (B 1)	13	235½	243½	2584
20	(Belgium) Daniel Dardha	2528																						13	235½	242½	2609
21	(Serbia) Aleksandar Inđić	2616																						13	231	240	2571
22	(Uzbekistan) Jakhongir Vakhidov	2507																						13	229½	238½	2638
23	(China) Yu Yangyi	2807						½ (B 1)	0 (W 2)															12½	253	262	2647
24	(FIDE) Aleksandr Shimanov	2605				0 (B 4)	0 (W 6)								0 (B 5)						½ (B 2)	0 (W 1)		12½	246	252½	2644
25	(France) Jules Moussard	2606														0 (W 5)								12½	238	245½	2593
26	(FIDE) Alexander Riazantsev	2595																						12½	236	244½	2630
27	(Azerbaijan) Rauf Mamedov	2649								0 (B 5)														12½	236	244½	2593
28	(Spain) David Antón Guijarro	2585																						12½	236	244	2650
29	(FIDE) Maxim Matlakov	2674												½ (W 6)										12½	234½	243½	2581
30	(FIDE) Alexander Grischuk	2763																0 (B 2)						12½	234½	243	2596
31	(France) Maxime Vachier-Lagrave	2771																						12½	233	242½	2588
32	(Armenia) Zaven Andriasian	2625			0 (W 2)																			12½	230½	239½	2569
33	(Armenia) Tigran L. Petrosian	2632						0 (B 6)																12½	229½	238	2546
34	(FIDE) Andrey Esipenko	2620																					0 (B 4)	12½	227½	236	2540
35	(FIDE) Volodar Murzin	2586																						12½	225½	232½	2610
36	(Azerbaijan) Aydin Suleymanli	2481																						12½	222	229	2603
37	(United States) Andrew Tang	2582							0 (W 3)															12½	221½	229	2577
38	(Armenia) Shant Sargsyan	2602					0 (W 3)																	12½	219	227	2578
39	(Uzbekistan) Nodirbek Yakubboev	2560	0 (W 2)		0 (W 3)																			12½	211½	219	2556
40	(Uzbekistan) Mukhiddin Madaminov	2333																		0 (B 1)				12	242	251½	2651
41	(United States) Christopher Yoo	2463																						12	234½	239½	2638
42	(India) Arjun Erigaisi	2750																						12	226	234	2565
43	(FIDE) Mikhail Kobalia	2662																						12	219½	228	2516
44	(Israel) Boris Gelfand	2620																						12	219½	228	2512
45	(Egypt) Bassem Amin	2713																						12	219½	227½	2566
46	(FIDE) Klementy Sychev	2563																						12	219½	225	2596
47	(United States) Hans Niemann	2632																						12	219	228	2533
48	(Georgia (country)) Levan Pantsulaia	2563																						12	213	218	2578
49	(India) Adhiban Baskaran	2613																						12	204½	211	2503
50	(FIDE) Sergei Zhigalko	2662																						12	201	205½	2469
51	(Georgia (country)) Giga Quparadze	2587		0 (B 4)																				11½	238½	245½	2630
52	(Turkey) Vahap Şanal	2576																						11½	238	246½	2661
53	(United States) Sam Shankland	2612			0 (W 4)																			11½	234½	243	2611
54	(FIDE) Pavel Ponkratov	2539	0 (W 5)																					11½	230½	238	2628
55	(Vietnam) Lê Tuấn Minh	2530																		0 (W 6)				11½	230½	236½	2613
56	(FIDE) Zhamsaran Tsydypov	2593		0 (B 1)																				11½	228½	236½	2597
57	(Iran) Parham Maghsoodloo	2672																						11½	225	233	2564
58	(India) Pranav V	2440				0 (B 5)																		11½	224½	233½	2629
59	(Armenia) Gabriel Sargissian	2559																						11½	219	225½	2607
60	(India) Aravindh Chithambaram	2586		0 (B 5)																				11½	218½	226	2545
61	(Czech Republic) Thai Dai Van Nguyen	2534																						11½	213½	221	2592
62	(Norway) Aryan Tari	2620																						11½	213	221½	2521
63	(Germany) Rasmus Svane	2674																						11½	213	219½	2516
64	(Armenia) Samvel Ter-Sahakyan	2585																						11½	212	220	2490
65	(Azerbaijan) Mahammad Muradli	2610			0 (W 5)																			11½	211	219	2500
66	(United States) Timur Gareyev	2553																						11½	200½	207	2556
67	(Azerbaijan) Shakhriyar Mamedyarov	2733									½ (B 4)	½ (B 1)	½ (W 5)											11	237	245½	2610
68	(Bulgaria) Ivan Cheparinov	2623			0 (W 1)			½ (W 5)																11	234	243	2564
69	(Armenia) Manuel Petrosyan	2560							0 (W 5)															11	225½	230	2608
70	(FIDE) Evgeny Tomashevsky	2698				0 (B 1)																		11	222	230½	2556
71	(Canada) Eric Hansen	2568																						11	220	224½	2559
72	(India) Surya Shekhar Ganguly	2530	1 (W 3)																					11	218	226	2597
73	(Spain) Alvar Alonso Rosell	2514																						11	218	223	2564
74	(FIDE) Maksim Chigaev	2542																						11	217½	225½	2597
75	(Kazakhstan) Denis Makhnev	2507																						11	216½	223½	2585
76	(Egypt) Ahmed Adly	2605																						11	213½	220½	2493
77	(Spain) Francisco Vallejo Pons	2644																						11	213	221	2521
78	(Georgia (country)) Baadur Jobava	2582																						11	211	218½	2545
79	(Uzbekistan) Shamsiddin Vokhidov	2597																						11	205½	213	2487
80	(Iran) Ehsan Ghaem Maghami	2596																						11	196½	203	2439
81	(FIDE) Alexei Fedorov	2488		0 (B 2)																				11	196	201	2497
82	(FIDE) David Paravyan	2551																						10½	238	247	2653
83	(Germany) Matthias Blübaum	2634							0 (W 6)			0 (B 3)												10½	236	244½	2578
84	(India) Raunak Sadhwani	2657																						10½	235	244½	2576
85	(Iran) Bardiya Daneshvar	2428				0 (B 6)					0 (W 3)													10½	231½	240½	2635
86	(Austria) Valentin Dragnev	2523																						10½	223	231½	2591
87	(Kazakhstan) Kazybek Nogerbek	2487																						10½	223	229½	2579
88	(Netherlands) Jorden van Foreest	2663																						10½	222	231½	2573
89	(Singapore) Tin Jingyao	2462																						10½	221½	230½	2620
90	(India) Vidit Gujrathi	2669																						10½	220½	230	2571
91	(FIDE) Sergei Yudin	2599																						10½	215	222½	2533
92	(Germany) Frederik Svane	2466																						10½	214	221½	2568
93	(Kazakhstan) Zhandos Agmanov	2389																						10½	211½	219½	2597
94	(Mongolia) Dambasürengiin Batsüren	2409																						10½	211½	216½	2573
95	(FIDE) Daniil Lintchevski	2589																						10½	210½	218	2488
96	(Australia) Bobby Cheng	2476																						10½	210	216½	2538
97	(India) S. L. Narayanan	2562		0 (B 3)	0 (B 6)																			10½	208	214½	2519
98	(France) Sébastien Mazé	2431																						10½	201½	209½	2516
99	(FIDE) Sanan Sjugirov	2613																						10½	197½	205	2457
100	(Iran) Amin Tabatabaei	2551	½ (B 6)																					10	234	242½	2601
101	(FIDE) Alexandr Predke	2616																						10	226	233½	2535
102	(FIDE) Vladislav Kovalev	2556	0 (W 1)																					10	222½	230½	2587
103	(FIDE) Arseniy Nesterov	2477																						10	219	226½	2557
104	(Armenia) Mamikon Gharibyan	2401																						10	218½	227	2585
105	(Iran) Pouya Idani	2610																						10	217½	225½	2509
106	(Kazakhstan) Arystan Isanzhulov	2383																						10	215½	224	2568
107	(Kazakhstan) Arystanbek Urazayev	2464																						10	213	221	2563
108	(Germany) Alexander Donchenko	2581																						10	212	220	2503
109	(Norway) Johan-Sebastian Christiansen	2501																						10	204½	210	2530
110	(Canada) Aman Hambleton	2538																						10	193	200½	2467
111	(Turkey) Mustafa Yilmaz	2564																						10	192	199	2438
112	(Mongolia) Gombosuren Munkhgal	2577																						10	189½	195½	2419
113	(India) Srinath Narayanan	2459																						10	189	194	2405
114	(Azerbaijan) Vasif Durarbayli	2576																						9½	223½	228½	2606
115	(FIDE) Nikita Petrov	2531		½ (W 6)						0 (B 3)														9½	221	227½	2625
116	(Azerbaijan) Vugar Asadli	2635																						9½	220	229	2540
117	(England) Ameet Ghasi	2587																						9½	218½	227	2565
118	(Uzbekistan) Javokhir Sindarov	2639																						9½	216½	226	2506
119	(Kazakhstan) Rinat Jumabayev	2583				0 (B 3)																		9½	215	223	2548
120	(Armenia) Robert Hovhannisyan	2570																						9½	215	220½	2580
121	(FIDE) Evgeniy Najer	2566																						9½	209½	217	2530
122	(FIDE) Aleksej Aleksandrov	2391																						9½	204½	211½	2540
123	(Kazakhstan) Rustam Khusnutdinov	2510																						9½	204½	211	2513
124	(Kazakhstan) Ramazan Zhalmakhanov	2432																						9½	197½	204	2486
125	(Kazakhstan) Konstantin Kazakov	2379																						9½	189½	194	2419
126	(India) Abhimanyu Puranik	2506																						9½	187½	193½	2449
127	(Armenia) Tigran K. Harutyunyan	2426																						9½	182½	188½	2417
128	(Kazakhstan) Abilmansur Abdilkhair	2157																						9½	169½	174	2348
129	(Montenegro) Denis Kadrić	2657										0 (W 6)												9	237	247	2558
130	(Ukraine) Alexander Moiseenko	2577																						9	227½	235½	2567
131	(Mongolia) Sumiya Bilguun	2365																						9	221	229	2597
132	(Serbia) Velimir Ivić	2614																						9	205	213	2491
133	(FIDE) Rudik Makarian	2440																						9	203½	208½	2550
134	(Kosovo) Nderim Saraci	2549	0 (W 4)																					9	201½	208½	2478
135	(FIDE) Nikolay Averin	2231																						9	201	205½	2528
136	(India) Sankalp Gupta	2438																						9	199	205½	2494
137	(Serbia) Vuk Damjanović	2439																						9	197½	204	2467
138	(Uzbekistan) Mukhammadzokhid Suyarov	2217																						9	194½	200½	2476
139	(Mongolia) Munkhdalai Amilal	2144																						9	184	189	2415
140	(Azerbaijan) Abdulla Gadimbayli	2399																						9	178	183	2396
141	(Uzbekistan) Khumoyun Begmuratov	2267																						9	174½	179½	2392
142	(Kazakhstan) Aldiyar Ansat	2302																						8½	219	227	2583
143	(Italy) Sabino Brunello	2641																						8½	216	224½	2528
144	(FIDE) Maksim Tsaruk	2330																						8½	214	221½	2527
145	(FIDE) Alexander Khripachenko	2301																						8½	203	210½	2506
146	(Kazakhstan) Petr Kostenko	2365																						8½	193	197½	2404
147	(FIDE) Lev Zverev	2333																						8½	192½	199½	2505
148	(India) Harsha Bharathakoti	2527																						8½	192½	199½	2438
149	(India) Arjun Kalyan	2426																						8½	187½	193½	2403
150	(Moldova) Victor Bologan	2525																						8½	186½	191½	2453
151	(FIDE) Vladimir Burmakin	2513																						8½	178½	184½	2367
152	(Kazakhstan) Daniyal Sapenov	2060																						8½	175	181	2404
153	(Tajikistan) Mustafokhuja Khusenkhojaev	2217																						8½	165½	170	2347
154	(Austria) Jakob Postlmayer	2182																						8½	164½	169	2308
155	(Kyrgyzstan) Semetei Tologon Tegin	2264																						8½	161	165½	2296
156	(FIDE) Boris Savchenko	2577																						8	198	205	2445
157	(FIDE) Artem Uskov	2401																						8	190	196	2407
158	(FIDE) Savva Vetokhin	2312																						8	188½	195	2439
159	(Bulgaria) Momchil Petkov	2411																						8	187½	192	2405
160	(Norway) Benjamin Haldorsen	2389																						8	181	186	2420
161	(Kyrgyzstan) Aziz Degenbaev	2039																						8	164	169	2322
162	(Estonia) Andrei Shishkov	2230																						8	157½	162	2303
163	(Kazakhstan) Alisher Suleymenov	2351																						7½	206½	211½	2486
164	(Kazakhstan) Azamat Utegaliyev	2405																						7½	196½	201	2442
165	(Turkey) Ediz Gürel	2345																						7½	194½	199½	2491
166	(Kazakhstan) Edgar Mamedov	2034																						7½	185	190	2430
167	(FIDE) Egor Korelskiy	2307																						7½	164½	169½	2314
168	(Kyrgyzstan) Melis Mamatov	2299																						7½	156½	161	2255
169	(Kosovo) Endrit Uruci	2379																						7	177	181½	2353
170	(Kazakhstan) Ergali Suleimen	2050																						7	163½	168	2302
171	(Libya) Ali Elier	2173																						6½	158½	163	2247
172	(Kazakhstan) Imangali Akhilbay	2003																						6	157½	162	2254
173	(Kazakhstan) Ernur Amangeldy	2023																						5½	162	166½	2266
174	(Wales) Elijah Everett	2146																						5½	155½	160	2247
175	(Hong Kong) Niilo Man Nissinen	1896																						5	160½	165½	2285
176	(Kazakhstan) Dinmukhammed Tulendinov	1931																						0	125	126	0

== Women's tournament results ==
The following table lists all participants, with the results from the 17 rounds. They are ranked according to the results, taking into account the tie-breaks.

Notation: "1 (B 57)" indicates a win (1 point) with black pieces (B) against player who finished in 57th place.

Rank	Name	Rating	1	2	3	4	5	6	7	8	9	10	11	12	13	14	15	16	17	Total	BC1	BS	AROC1
1	(Kazakhstan) Bibisara Assaubayeva	2404	1 (B 57)																	13	164½	170½	2375
2	(India) Koneru Humpy	2474																		12½	148½	155½	2260
3	(FIDE) Polina Shuvalova	2361																		12	171	178½	2398
4	(China) Tan Zhongyi	2510																		12	169	175	2389
5	(Georgia (country)) Meri Arabidze	2404																		11½	155½	161½	2326
6	(FIDE) Kateryna Lagno	2522																		11	165½	172½	2343
7	(Georgia (country)) Nana Dzagnidze	2416																		11	163	170½	2346
8	(FIDE) Olga Badelka	2337																		11	161½	168	2324
9	(Germany) Elisabeth Pähtz	2396																		11	158	165	2314
10	(Azerbaijan) Gunay Mammadzada	2383																		11	155½	161½	2315
11	(Bulgaria) Antoaneta Stefanova	2427																		11	155	162	2315
12	(Kazakhstan) Zhansaya Abdumalik	2413																		11	138½	145	2223
13	(India) Harika Dronavalli	2407																		10½	173	181	2391
14	(Armenia) Elina Danielian	2331																		10½	171	178	2350
15	(FIDE) Alexandra Kosteniuk	2469																		10½	160½	168	2313
16	(Uzbekistan) Umida Omonova	1978																		10½	154½	160½	2332
17	(India) Padmini Rout	2298																		10½	145	150½	2249
18	(United States) Anna Zatonskih	2362																		10½	140	146½	2216
19	(FIDE) Valentina Gunina	2368																		10	169½	177	2375
20	(FIDE) Aleksandra Goryachkina	2484																		10	166	174½	2370
21	(India) Tania Sachdev	2309																		10	158½	165	2296
22	(Iran) Sarasadat Khademalsharieh	2431																		10	158	163½	2309
23	(Georgia (country)) Nino Batsiashvili	2365																		10	151	158½	2246
24	(Philippines) Janelle Mae Frayna	2306																		10	148	154½	2252
25	(Poland) Aleksandra Maltsevskaya	2296																		10	142½	147½	2157
26	(Ukraine) Nataliya Buksa	2303																		9½	162½	169½	2332
27	(Georgia (country)) Lela Javakhishvili	2364																		9½	152	159	2302
28	(Mongolia) Davaadembereliin Nomin-Erdene	2296																		9½	145	152	2274
29	(Singapore) Gong Qianyun	2199																		9½	144½	150½	2290
30	(FIDE) Daria Voit	2260																		9½	144½	148	2236
31	(Georgia (country)) Bela Khotenashvili	2385																		9½	140	147	2218
32	(Ukraine) Anna Ushenina	2395																		9½	137½	143	2218
33	(FIDE) Ekaterina Borisova	2036																		9½	134	137½	2199
34	(India) Savitha Shri B	2311																		9½	132½	139	2109
35	(FIDE) Olga Girya	2310																		9½	130	136	2166
36	(FIDE) Evgenija Ovod	2195																		9	151½	156½	2296
37	(Uzbekistan) Afruza Khamdamova	2018																		9	147	152½	2279
38	(Serbia) Teodora Injac	2316																		9	144½	150	2183
39	(FIDE) Baira Kovanova	2202																		9	143½	149	2258
40	(FIDE) Leya Garifullina	2231																		9	139½	145	2252
41	(FIDE) Alina Bivol	2301																		9	139	145	2170
42	(Ukraine) Yuliia Osmak	2328																		9	134	139½	2181
43	(Armenia) Mariam Mkrtchyan	2274																		9	129½	135	2111
44	(Uzbekistan) Nafisa Muminova	2258																		9	129	133	2142
45	(United States) Gulrukhbegim Tokhirjonova	2236																		8½	152	157½	2324
46	(Mongolia) Turmunkh Munkhzul	2144																		8½	150½	157	2317
47	(Azerbaijan) Ulviyya Fataliyeva	2322																		8½	148½	156	2276
48	(Kazakhstan) Meruert Kamalidenova	2285																		8½	145	151	2255
49	(Czech Republic) Anna Lhotska	2196																		8½	143½	149	2229
50	(FIDE) Daria Charochkina	2284																		8½	142½	149	2220
51	(Armenia) Susanna Gaboyan	2152																		8½	139	144½	2198
52	(Azerbaijan) Govhar Beydullayeva	2256																		8½	138½	144	2194
53	(Azerbaijan) Gulnar Mammadova	2289																		8½	131	135	2135
54	(FIDE) Olga Druzhinina	2014																		8½	129½	133	2153
55	(Azerbaijan) Khanim Balajayeva	2284																		8½	120	125	2082
56	(Kazakhstan) Nazerke Nurgali	2067																		8	151	159	2299
57	(Kazakhstan) Xeniya Balabayeva	2163	0 (W 1)																	8	150½	156	2320
58	(Georgia (country)) Sofio Gvetadze	2245																		8	137½	140½	2151
59	(FIDE) Anna Shukhman	2061																		8	136½	142	2187
60	(Ukraine) Inna Gaponenko	2291																		8	136	143	2194
61	(Kazakhstan) Amina Kairbekova	2064																		8	132	135½	2158
62	(Azerbaijan) Laman Hajiyeva	2038																		8	131½	137	2226
63	(China) Lu Miaoyi	2168																		8	126½	130	2099
64	(Kazakhstan) Zarina Nurgaliyeva	1904																		8	125½	131	2194
65	(Germany) Lara Schulze	2166																		8	125½	131	2076
66	(Kazakhstan) Guliskhan Nakhbayeva	2226																		7½	143	148	2217
67	(Kazakhstan) Alua Nurmanova	2091																		7½	141	147	2273
68	(Ukraine) Irina Petrova	2023																		7½	140	144	2246
69	(Serbia) Jovana Eric	2233																		7½	136½	141½	2159
70	(Mongolia) Khishigbaatar Bayasgalan	1840																		7½	134	140	2216
71	(Georgia (country)) Sopio Tereladze	2100																		7½	125½	128½	2086
72	(Kazakhstan) Elnaz Kaliakhmet	1728																		7½	106	111	2045
73	(United States) Atousa Pourkashiyan	2248																		7	146½	152½	2239
74	(Kazakhstan) Liya Kurmangaliyeva	2081																		7	145½	151½	2308
75	(Mongolia) Altan-Ulzii Enkhtuul	2139																		7	140	147	2252
76	(Kazakhstan) Assel Serikbay	2044																		7	131	136½	2193
77	(FIDE) Viktoriia Kirchei	2005																		7	131	136½	2145
78	(Kazakhstan) Alfia Nasybullina	1992																		7	122½	126	2099
79	(Kazakhstan) Zeinep Sultanbek	1924																		7	118	122	2054
80	(Kazakhstan) Kristina Kim	1869																		7	115	118	2026
81	(Kazakhstan) Arnash Bauyrzhan	1941																		7	114½	117½	2018
82	(England) Yao Lan	2174																		6½	136	139½	2158
83	(Norway) Monika Machlik	2018																		6½	127	130	2116
84	(Kazakhstan) Ayaulym Kaldarova	1804																		6½	118½	121½	2102
85	(Kyrgyzstan) Aleksandra Samaganova	1864																		6½	112	115	2017
86	(Turkey) Ekaterina Atalik	2306																		6	145	152	2174
87	(Kazakhstan) Asiya Assylkhan	1372																		6	119	122	2010
88	(FIDE) Irina Mikhaylova	2039																		6	110½	113½	1948
89	(Malaysia) Siti Zulaikha Foudzi	2136																		6	109	112	1936
90	(FIDE) Galina Mikheeva	1969																		5½	124½	127½	2101
91	(Mongolia) Tumurbaatar Nomindalai	2027																		5½	124	127	2084
92	(FIDE) Anastasya Paramzina	2145																		5	138	144	2288
93	(Armenia) Lilit Mkrtchian	2316																		5	126	131½	2049
94	(Kazakhstan) Gulnar Balakanova	1747																		4½	106	109	1949
95	(Kazakhstan) Bakhyt Balakanova	1943																		4	117	120	2058
96	(Brazil) Marina Martins De Aguiar	1779																		4	107	110	1943
97	(United States) Jocelyn Chen	1754																		4	106½	109½	2002
98	(Kazakhstan) Aidana Madi	1561																		3½	95½	99	1913
99	(Kazakhstan) Dinara Saduakassova	2404																		0	84	85	0
