= World Rapid Chess Championship 2022 =

FIDE tournament in Almaty, Kazakhstan

	World Rapid Champion	Women's World Rapid Champion
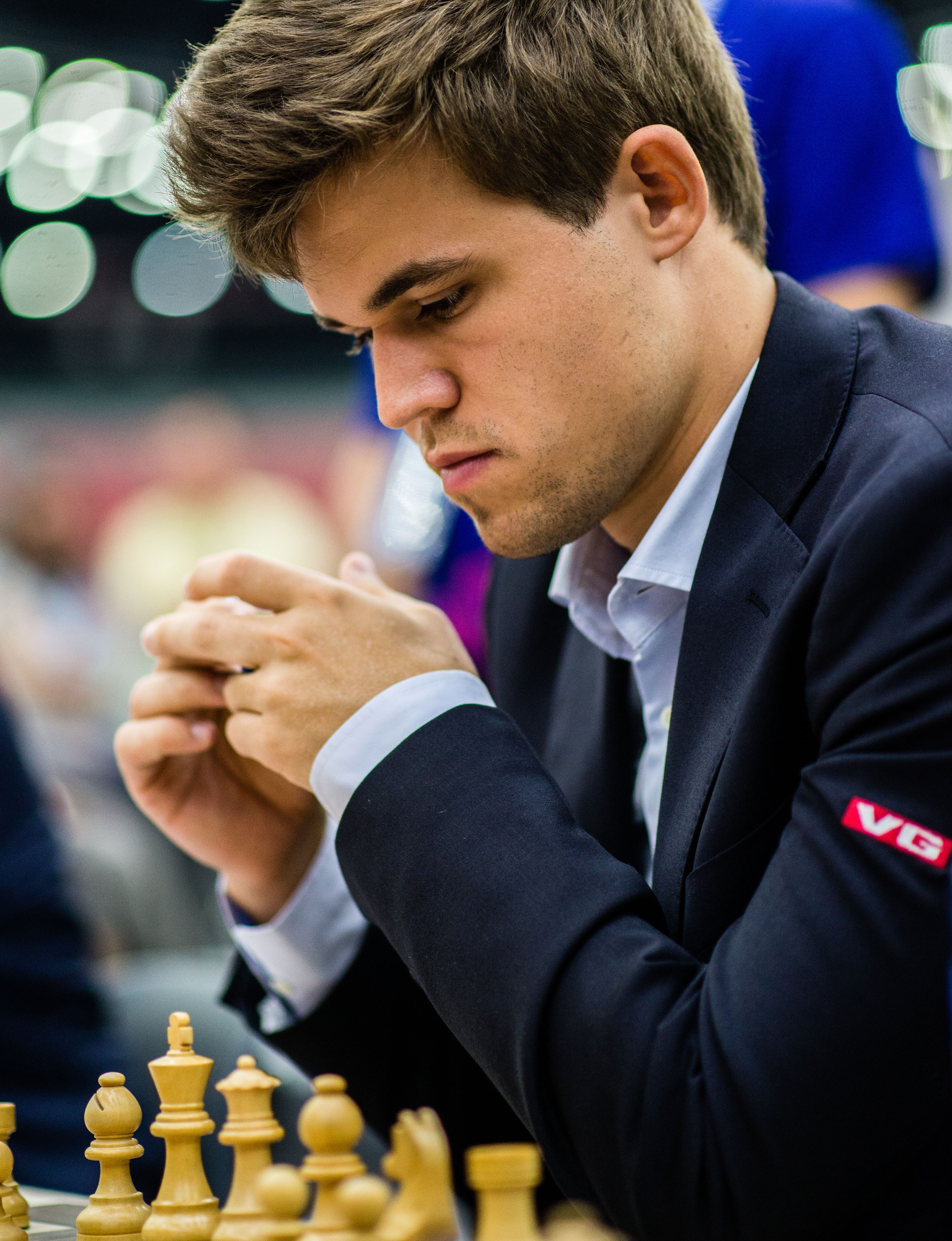
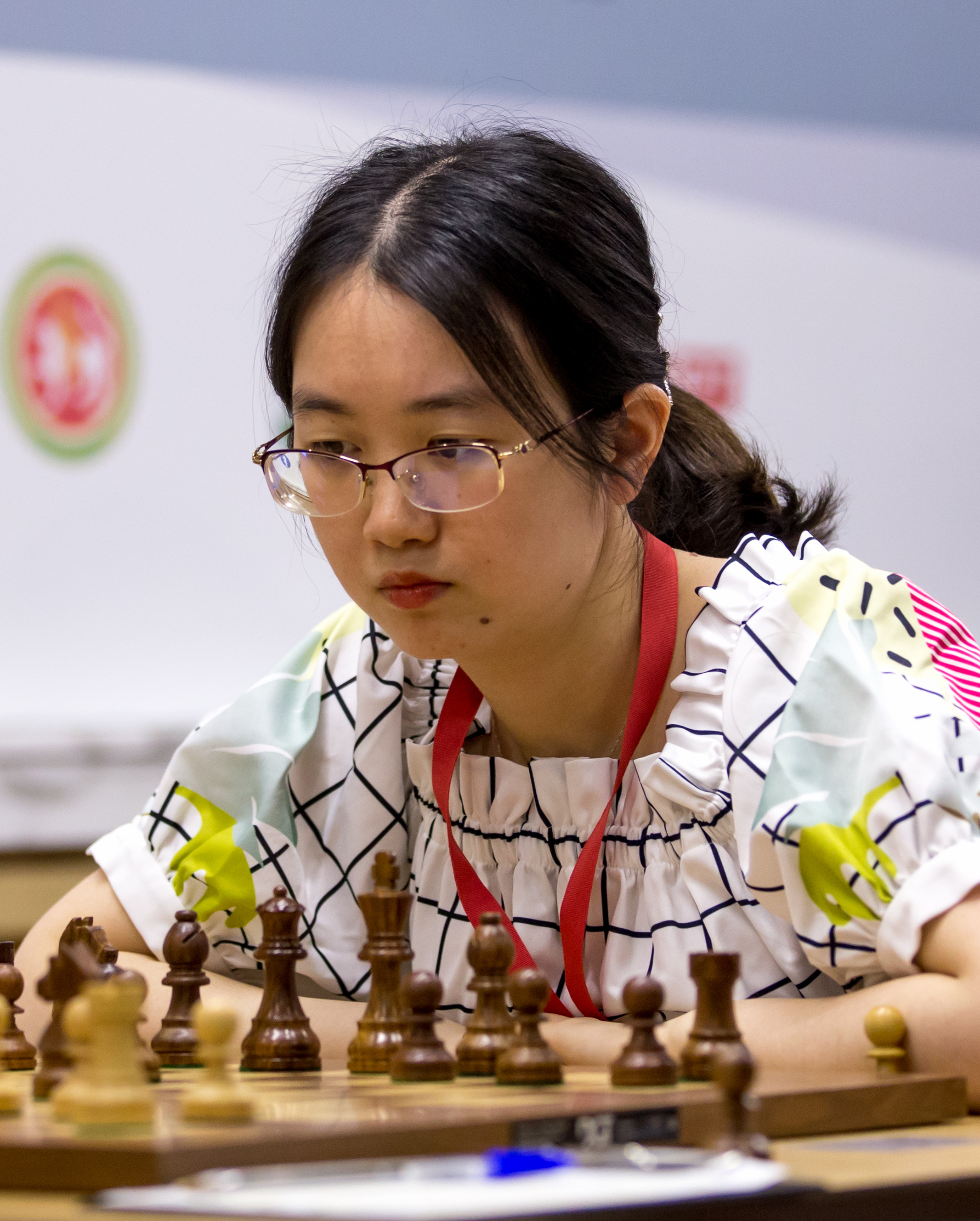
	(Norway) Magnus Carlsen	(China) Tan Zhongyi
10/13	Scores	8½/11
	Born 30 November 1990; 32 years old	Born 29 May 1991; 31 years old
	Rating: 2834 (World No. 1)	Rating: 2502 (World No. 562)

The World Rapid Chess Championship 2022 was the 2022 edition of the annual World Rapid Chess Championship held by FIDE to determine the world champion in chess played under rapid time controls. Since 2012, FIDE has held the World Rapid and Blitz Championships at a joint tournament. The tournament was held in Almaty, Kazakhstan from 26–28 December 2022, using a Swiss-system with 13 rounds for the open tournament and 11 rounds for the women's tournament. Players who were eligible to participate in the open tournament were either rated at least 2550 Elo in a FIDE rating list during 2022, or were the reigning national champion.

== Participants ==
178 players took part in the open tournament, and 98 in the women's tournament.

== Prize fund ==
The prize fund for both the open and women's tournament is shown below. In case of a tie (except for first place) all prize money was shared between the players. Players outside the brackets did not receive any prize money. All amounts are in United States dollars.

Open tournament:

- 1st place: $60,000
- 2nd place: $50,000
- 3rd place: $40,000
- 4th place: $30,000
- 5th place: $25,000
- 6th place: $22,000
- 7th place: $18,000
- 8th place: $14,000
- 9th place: $11,000
- 10th place: $8,000
- 11th–16th places: $5,000
- 17th–25th places: $3,000
- 26th–35th places: $1,500

Total: $350,000

Women's tournament:

- 1st place: $40,000
- 2nd place: $30,000
- 3rd place: $20,000
- 4th place: $15,000
- 5th place: $10,000
- 6th place: $7,000
- 7th place: $6,000
- 8th place: $5,000
- 9th place: $4,000
- 10th place: $3,000
- 11th–15th places: $2,000

Total: $150,000

== Tiebreak regulations ==
For players who finished on the same score, final position was determined by the following tie-breaks, in order:

1. Buchholz Cut 1 (the sum of the scores of each of the opponents of a player but reduced by the lowest score of the opponents)
2. Buchholz (the sum of the scores of each of the opponents of a player)
3. Average Rating of Opponents Cut 1 (average rating of opponents excluding the lowest rated opponent)
4. The results of individual games between tied players
5. Drawing of lots

If two or more players were tied for any position other than first, the above mentioned tiebreak system decided the ranking of the tied players. If there was a tie for the 1st place, a play-off would be played among all players in tie to determine the new champion.

== Open tournament results ==
The following table lists all participants, with the results from the 13 rounds. They are ranked according to the results, taking into account the tie-breaks.

Notation: "59b1" indicates a game against the player of rank 59 (Samvel Ter-Sahakyan) with black pieces that resulted in a win (1 point).

Rk.	Name	Elo	1	2	3	4	5	6	7	8	9	10	11	12	13	Pts.	BC1	BS	AROC1
1	(Norway) Magnus Carlsen	2834	59b1	174w1	56b1	10w1	5b½	57w1	6b½	4w½	55b1	2w1	7b0	3w½	17w1	10	100	107	2660
2	(Germany) Vincent Keymer	2590	97b1	139w1	7b0	80w1	4b½	3w1	24b1	5w1	6b½	1b0	14w1	15w1	19b½	9,5	102,5	107,5	2682
3	(United States) Fabiano Caruana	2747	141w1	41b½	45w1	28b½	62w½	2b0	65w1	103b1	58w1	6w1	4b½	1b½	7w1	9,5	96,5	101,5	2649
4	(FIDE) Daniil Dubov	2712	109w1	45b½	41w½	60b1	2w½	11b1	9w1	1b½	10w½	12b1	3w½	8b½	6w½	9	103	109	2669
5	(India) Arjun Erigaisi	2628	150b1	33w1	101b1	8w1	1w½	6b0	12w1	2b0	19w1	7b0	18w1	14b½	27w1	9	102,5	107,5	2711
6	(FIDE) Vladimir Fedoseev	2741	134b1	88w1	94b1	9w½	104b1	5w1	1w½	10b½	2w½	3b0	24b1	7w½	4b½	9	100	105,5	2668
7	(FIDE) Vladislav Artemiev	2727	53w1	60b1	2w1	57b0	11w½	41b½	64w1	58b½	23b1	5w1	1w1	6b½	3b0	9	99,5	106,5	2638
8	(Romania) Richárd Rapport	2802	130w1	120b½	105w1	5b0	65w1	43b½	100w0	59b1	88w½	60w1	58b1	4w½	23b1	9	85,5	91	2591
9	(India) Nihal Sarin	2628	92w1	114b1	55w1	6b½	24b½	14w½	4b0	33w½	91b1	13w½	20b1	10w½	16b½	8,5	96,5	102,5	2655
10	(Uzbekistan) Nodirbek Abdusattorov	2676	127w1	91b1	137w1	1b0	101w1	13w1	14b1	6w½	4b½	24w½	15b0	9b½	11w½	8,5	96,5	101,5	2676
11	(Azerbaijan) Rauf Mamedov	2578	151b1	13w0	87b1	111w1	7b½	4w0	22b1	35w1	17b½	15w0	69b1	24w1	10b½	8,5	96,5	101,5	2629
12	(Netherlands) Anish Giri	2708	49b1	66w1	43b1	13w½	14b½	23w½	5b0	60w1	90b1	4w0	55b1	16w½	15b½	8,5	96	102,5	2634
13	(Poland) Jan-Krzysztof Duda	2791	122w1	11b1	68w1	12b½	57w½	10b0	41w1	16b½	30w½	9b½	89w1	17b0	26w1	8,5	95	101	2627
14	(FIDE) Ian Nepomniachtchi	2766	75w1	105b½	120w1	32b1	12w½	9b½	10w0	62b1	16w½	56w1	2b0	5w½	46b1	8,5	95	100,5	2629
15	(India) Vidit Gujrathi	2659	50w1	67b½	65w1	62b½	23w0	63b½	107w1	21b½	83w1	11b1	10w1	2b0	12w½	8,5	93,5	99,5	2580
16	(FIDE) Alexey Sarana	2629	126w1	71b½	42w½	72b1	39w1	27b½	55w½	13w½	14b½	26w½	64b1	12b½	9w½	8,5	93,5	99	2605
17	(Iran) Parham Maghsoodloo	2656	142w1	101b0	34w1	137b1	59w½	25b½	49w1	100b½	11w½	41b½	21w1	13w1	1b0	8,5	90,5	95,5	2592
18	(FIDE) Alexander Grischuk	2759	52b½	77w½	102b1	88w½	26b1	66w½	61b½	43w1	56b½	63w½	5b0	71w1	51b1	8,5	88	94	2563
19	(France) Maxime Vachier-Lagrave	2777	102b½	26w½	112b1	121w1	61b½	88w½	60b½	47w1	5b0	66w½	67b1	63w1	2w½	8,5	87,5	93	2571
20	(India) Surya Shekhar Ganguly	2646	99w1	55b0	96w1	107b½	21w½	91b½	63w½	82b1	50w1	25b½	9w0	72b1	42w1	8,5	87	93	2535
21	(FIDE) Maksim Chigaev	2548	139b0	129w1	140b½	147w1	20b½	28w1	35b½	15w½	46b½	90w1	17b0	93w1	43b1	8,5	85	90	2542
22	(Vietnam) Lê Tuấn Minh	2442	95w½	29b1	100w½	36w½	105b½	89b½	11w0	113b1	137w1	57b½	68w½	45b1	41w1	8,5	83,5	88,5	2603
23	(FIDE) Volodar Murzin	2534	164w1	31b½	73w½	56w1	15b1	12b½	27w½	44b½	7w0	29b½	123w1	30b1	8w0	8	93	97	2692
24	(China) Yu Yangyi	2743	133w1	121b1	62w½	58b1	9w½	55b½	2w0	61b1	100w1	10b½	6w0	11b0	63b1	8	90,5	96	2608
25	(Armenia) Manuel Petrosyan	2539	153w1	138b0	92w½	85b1	40w1	17w½	47b½	31b1	27w½	20w½	46b½	28w½	36b½	8	90,5	95,5	2602
26	(Iran) Amin Tabatabaei	2526	44w½	19b½	164w1	68b1	18w0	31b0	108w1	78b1	120w1	16b½	30w½	56w1	13b0	8	90	94	2662
27	(Azerbaijan) Shakhriyar Mamedyarov	2746	77b½	52w1	61b½	117w1	174b1	16w½	23b½	90w½	25b½	64w½	63b½	66w1	5b0	8	89,5	95,5	2574
28	(Germany) Rasmus Svane	2641	42w½	115b1	136w1	3w½	55b0	21b0	34w1	122b1	92w½	88b1	41w½	25b½	31w½	8	89	94,5	2552
29	(Israel) Boris Gelfand	2641	37b½	22w0	74b+	122b+	91b½	33w½	116b1	66w½	67b½	23w½	51b½	49w1	38b½	8	88	93,5	2502
30	(FIDE) Dmitry Andreikin	2631	108w½	79b1	104w0	53b½	34w1	101b½	72w1	42b1	13b½	55w½	26b½	23w0	67b1	8	87,5	93,5	2539
31	(Spain) David Antón Guijarro	2640	119b1	23w½	125b½	55w0	75b1	26w1	88b½	25w0	71b½	59w½	52b1	48w1	28b½	8	87,5	93	2534
32	(United Arab Emirates) Salem Saleh	2644	83w1	104b½	67w1	14w0	64b0	53b1	91w½	71b½	72w½	82b½	102w1	34b½	55b1	8	85,5	91,5	2552
33	(India) Raunak Sadhwani	2532	177w1	5b0	93w0	149b1	70w1	29b½	160w1	9b½	68w½	89b0	81w1	35w½	56b1	8	85	87,5	2572
34	(Azerbaijan) Vugar Asadli	2500	35b0	146w1	17b0	76w1	30b0	97w1	28b0	128b1	138w½	94w1	95b1	32w½	58b1	8	84,5	89,5	2578
35	(FIDE) Andrey Esipenko	2694	34w1	137b0	154w1	41b½	107w1	64b½	21w½	11b0	101w1	100b½	72w½	33b½	66w1	8	84,5	89	2553
36	(FIDE) Evgeniy Najer	2590	129w1	154b½	106w½	22b½	42w0	142b½	39w1	92b0	141w1	37b½	79w1	70b1	25w½	8	82	86,5	2451
37	(FIDE) Sergei Yudin	2454	29w½	95b1	78w½	100b½	41w0	120b½	121b½	104w1	47b½	36w½	90b1	58w½	69b1	8	81,5	87	2606
38	(Kazakhstan) Kazybek Nogerbek	2409	175w½	100b0	89w0	98b1	133w1	82b½	81w1	41b0	65w1	45b½	88w1	68b1	29w½	8	81	86,5	2590
39	(Uzbekistan) Shamsiddin Vokhidov	2481	123w½	81b½	160w1	69w1	16b0	90w0	36b0	146b1	95w½	101b½	120w1	100b1	65w1	8	80	85	2612
40	(Armenia) Zaven Andriasian	2624	131b½	143w½	145b½	125w1	25b0	77w1	122b½	102w½	59w½	72b0	109w1	113b1	74w1	8	76,5	81,5	2497
41	(Armenia) Haik M. Martirosyan	2575	128b1	3w½	4b½	35w½	37b1	7w½	13b0	38w1	140b1	17w½	28b½	46w½	22b0	7,5	98	103	2605
42	(FIDE) Denis Lazavik	2453	28b½	46w1	16b½	103w½	36b1	47w½	56b½	30w0	43b½	54w½	61b1	64w1	20b0	7,5	92	98	2615
43	(Germany) Alexander Donchenko	2597	148w1	156b1	12w0	48b1	44w½	8w½	59b½	18b0	42w½	50b1	74w½	76b1	21w0	7,5	90,5	95	2566
44	(United States) Hikaru Nakamura	2795	26b½	102w½	77b1	63w1	43b½	61w½	103b½	23w½	66b½	67w½	49b½	55w½	53b½	7,5	86,5	92,5	2550
45	(Ukraine) Alexander Moiseenko	2570	110b1	4w½	3b0	92w½	111b1	140w½	74b0	48w½	142b1	38w½	96b1	22w0	93b1	7,5	86,5	91,5	2474
46	(Armenia) Gabriel Sargissian	2640	115w½	42b0	177w1	75b½	53w½	109b1	101w1	50b½	21w½	92b1	25w½	41b½	14w0	7,5	86	88,5	2528
47	(FIDE) David Paravyan	2609	135w1	106b½	111w½	49b½	116w1	42b½	25w½	19b0	37w½	102b½	92w1	74b½	50w½	7,5	84,5	90	2495
48	(FIDE) Arseniy Nesterov	2497	57w0	155b1	81w1	43w0	56b0	93b½	98w1	45b½	78w½	137b1	62w1	31b0	89w1	7,5	82,5	87	2567
49	(Azerbaijan) Aydin Suleymanli	2503	12w0	168b1	124w1	47w½	103b½	94w1	17b0	89b½	61w½	120b1	44w½	29b0	88w1	7,5	82,5	86,5	2642
50	(Australia) Bobby Cheng	2476	15b0	167w1	103b0	176w1	69b1	174w+	62w½	46w½	20b0	43w0	105b1	95w1	47b½	7,5	82,5	85,5	2550
51	(United States) Christopher Yoo	2463	78w½	73b0	157w1	120b½	54w1	100b0	86w1	160b½	103w1	68b½	29w½	89b1	18w0	7,5	81,5	86	2627
52	(Turkey) Mustafa Yılmaz	2521	18w½	27b0	115w1	89b0	163w1	138b½	84w1	120b0	162w1	62b½	31w0	94w1	90b1	7,5	80	84	2612
53	(Azerbaijan) Vasif Durarbayli	2513	7b0	110w½	159b1	30w½	46b½	32w0	143b1	69w0	154b½	144w1	138w1	86b1	44w½	7,5	79,5	84	2551
54	(Egypt) Ahmed Adly	2588	76b0	148w½	151b1	142w½	51b0	80w0	155w1	108b1	109w1	42b½	70w0	92b1	98w1	7,5	76	80,5	2417
55	(Georgia (country)) Giga Quparadze	2538	166w1	20w1	9b0	31b1	28w1	24w½	16b½	57b1	1w0	30b½	12w0	44b½	32w0	7	98,5	102,5	2686
56	(FIDE) Evgeny Tomashevsky	2628	87b1	116w1	1w0	23b0	48w1	71b1	42w½	74b1	18w½	14b0	100w1	26b0	33w0	7	93,5	99,5	2583
57	(Netherlands) Jorden van Foreest	2693	48b1	64w1	69b1	7w1	13b½	1b0	58w½	55w0	63b0	22w½	71b0	104w1	72b½	7	92,5	98,5	2610
58	(United States) Timur Gareyev	2617	74w1	111b½	71w1	24w0	130b1	104w1	57b½	7w½	3b0	93b1	8w0	37b½	34w0	7	91,5	97	2592
59	(Armenia) Samvel Ter-Sahakyan	2531	1w0	170b1	176w1	90w1	17b½	62b½	43w½	8w0	40b½	31b½	78w½	73b½	68w½	7	89	92	2638
60	(France) Sébastien Mazé	2574	140b1	7w0	143b1	4w0	80b1	125w1	19w½	12b0	70w1	8b0	76w0	79b½	106w1	7	88,5	93,5	2550
61	(FIDE) Alexandr Predke	2584	70w½	157b1	27w½	106b1	19w½	44b½	18w½	24w0	49b½	79b½	42w0	85b½	108w1	7	88,5	93	2564
62	(FIDE) Aleksandr Shimanov	2616	178b1	76w1	24b½	15w½	3b½	59w½	50b½	14w0	102b½	52w½	48b0	112w½	109b1	7	88,5	90	2574
63	(Egypt) Bassem Amin	2567	165w1	124b1	138w½	44b0	73w½	15w½	20b½	106b1	57w1	18b½	27w½	19b0	24w0	7	88	92	2688
64	(FIDE) Zhamsaran Tsydypov	2550	146w1	57b0	126w1	123b½	32w1	35w½	7b0	124b1	73w1	27b½	16w0	42b0	76w½	7	86,5	91,5	2623
65	(FIDE) Pavel Ponkratov	2569	147b½	159w1	15b0	79w1	8b0	119w1	3b0	142w½	38b0	87w1	83b1	84w1	39b0	7	86,5	91	2495
66	(Armenia) Shant Sargsyan	2561	168w1	12b0	108w½	148b1	138w1	18b½	68w½	29b½	44w½	19b½	73w1	27b0	35b0	7	86	90	2658
67	(Serbia) Aleksandar Inđić	2547	152w1	15w½	32b0	70b½	93w1	73b½	124w½	138b1	29w½	44b½	19w0	78b1	30w0	7	85,5	90,5	2627
68	(Germany) Matthias Blübaum	2617	144b1	80w1	13b0	26w0	134b1	145w1	66b½	140w½	33b½	51w½	22b½	38w0	59b½	7	85	90	2509
69	(Uzbekistan) Javokhir Sindarov	2596	149w1	176b1	57w0	39b0	50w0	79b1	96w½	53b1	74w½	83b1	11w0	110b1	37w0	7	85	88	2476
70	(Armenia) Mamikon Gharibyan	2382	61b½	117w0	118b1	67w½	33b0	75w½	77b1	116w1	60b0	121w1	54b1	36w0	82w½	7	83,5	89	2556
71	(Czech Republic) Thai Dai Van Nguyen	2534	171b1	16w½	58b0	139w1	94b½	56w0	146b1	32w½	31w½	123b½	57w1	18b0	81w½	7	83,5	88,5	2589
72	(FIDE) Mikhail Kobalia	2534	173b½	147w½	84b1	16w0	154b½	139w1	30b0	110w1	32b½	40w1	35b½	20w0	57w½	7	83	86,5	2487
73	(Bulgaria) Ivan Cheparinov	2652	118b½	51w1	23b½	91w½	63b½	67w½	104b1	88w½	64b0	114w1	66b0	59w½	75b½	7	82,5	88,5	2539
74	(Iran) Bardiya Daneshvar	2419	58b0	89b½	29w-	159w1	136w1	137b1	45w1	56w0	69b½	91w1	43b½	47w½	40b0	7	81,5	86	2552
75	(Georgia (country)) Levan Pantsulaia	2522	14b0	128w1	162b½	46w½	31w0	70b½	85w1	93b0	135w1	95b0	132w1	123b1	73w½	7	80,5	86	2550
76	(FIDE) Artem Uskov	2396	54w1	62b0	91w0	34b0	169b1	117w1	102b0	161w½	112b1	103w1	60b1	43w0	64b½	7	80,5	84,5	2555
77	(FIDE) Nikita Petrov	2519	27w½	18b½	44w0	166b1	160w½	40b0	70w0	84b½	149w1	85b½	137w½	129b1	110w1	7	80,5	84,5	2521
78	(India) Pentala Harikrishna	2646	51b½	118w1	37b½	101w0	114b½	141w½	145b1	26w0	48b½	122w1	59b½	67w0	112b1	7	80	85	2511
79	(India) Pranav V	2430	90b½	30w0	161b1	65b0	175w½	69w0	176b1	117w1	105b1	61w½	36b0	60w½	101b1	7	80	83	2579
80	(Azerbaijan) Mahammad Muradli	2447	160w1	68b0	86w1	2b0	60w0	54b1	120w0	107b½	121b0	139w½	153b1	114w1	103b1	7	78,5	83,5	2555
81	(Spain) Francisco Vallejo Pons	2682	161b½	39w½	48b0	126w½	150b1	122w0	38b0	143w1	115b1	140w1	33b0	102w1	71b½	7	78	83	2478
82	(India) Adhiban Baskaran	2538	154b0	158w½	85b0	151w1	144b1	38w½	125b1	20w0	97b1	32w½	93b0	96w1	70b½	7	78	82	2430
83	(Singapore) Tin Jingyao	2462	32b0	171w1	88b0	178w1	121b1	103w0	114b1	94w1	15b0	69w0	65w0	137b1	100w1	7	77,5	79	2545
84	(Kazakhstan) Aldiyar Ansat	2291	137w0	109b1	72w0	96b0	87b1	134w1	52b0	77w½	119b½	161w+	101w1	65b0	113w1	7	77	82	2518
85	(Uzbekistan) Mukhiddin Madaminov	2337	121b0	141b½	82w1	25w0	161b0	118w1	75b0	133b1	113w½	77w½	122b1	61w½	124b1	7	76,5	81,5	2551
86	(India) S. L. Narayanan	2605	143b½	131w½	80b0	132w1	112b½	161w½	51b0	115w½	144b½	145w1	116b1	53w0	118b1	7	73	78	2469
87	(United States) Andrew Tang	2439	56w0	169b1	11w0	160b0	84w0	98b0	177w1	164b1	163w1	65b0	154b1	116w1	105b1	7	70,5	73	2369
88	(Uzbekistan) Nodirbek Yakubboev	2573	93w1	6b0	83w1	18b½	123w1	19b½	31w½	73b½	8b½	28w0	38b0	97w1	49b0	6,5	93,5	99	2621
89	(FIDE) Sergei Zhigalko	2612	111b0	74w½	38b1	52w1	145b½	22w½	92b½	49w½	96b1	33w1	13b0	51w0	48b0	6,5	89,5	94,5	2499
90	(Armenia) Tigran L. Petrosian	2623	79w½	108b½	127w1	59b0	96w1	39b1	106w1	27b½	12w0	21b0	37w0	126b1	52w0	6,5	86,5	92	2523
91	(India) Abhimanyu Puranik	2549	155w1	10w0	76b1	73b½	29w½	20w½	32b½	162b1	9w0	74b0	126w½	98b0	131w1	6,5	85,5	90	2542
92	(Kazakhstan) Alisher Suleymenov	2440	9b0	178w1	25b½	45b½	137w½	175b1	89w½	36w1	28b½	46w0	47b0	54w0	121b1	6,5	85	86,5	2596
93	(Kyrgyzstan) Semetei Tologon Tegin	2319	88b0	134w1	33b1	174w0	67b0	48w½	112b1	75w1	124b1	58w0	82w1	21b0	45w0	6,5	84,5	90	2565
94	(France) Jules Moussard	2625	132w1	96b1	6w0	116b½	71w½	49b0	127w1	83b0	122w½	34b0	106w1	52b0	126w1	6,5	81,5	87	2513
95	(Armenia) Robert Hovhannisyan	2630	22b½	37w0	148b0	97w½	139b0	168w1	149b1	99w1	39b½	75w1	34w0	50b0	127w1	6,5	80	84	2442
96	(Serbia) Velimir Ivić	2489	162b1	94w0	20b0	84w1	90b0	147w1	69b½	121w1	89w0	107b1	45w0	82b0	123w1	6,5	79	84	2583
97	(Azerbaijan) Abdulla Gadimbayli	2399	2w0	107b0	171w½	95b½	164w1	34b0	175w1	127b1	82w0	141b½	117w1	88b0	120w1	6,5	76,5	80,5	2514
98	(Uzbekistan) Mukhammadzokhid Suyarov	2089	104b0	99b0	135w½	38w0	158b1	87w1	48b0	144w0	150b1	136b1	141w1	91w1	54b0	6,5	75	79	2485
99	(FIDE) Rudik Makarian	2466	20b0	98w1	174b0	172b0	128w1	162w0	163b1	95b0	146w1	105w0	139b1	120b½	137w1	6,5	70,5	74	2461
100	(United States) Hans Niemann	2592	125b½	38w1	22b½	37w½	140b½	51w1	8b1	17w½	24b0	35w½	56b0	39w0	83b0	6	93	98	2553
101	(Turkey) Vahap Şanal	2547	167b1	17w1	5w0	78b1	10b0	30w½	46b0	154w1	35b0	39w½	84b0	144w1	79w0	6	87,5	91,5	2532
102	(FIDE) Vladislav Kovalev	2523	19w½	44b½	18w0	163b½	148w1	123b½	76w1	40b½	62w½	47w½	32b0	81b0	107w½	6	85,5	89,5	2628
103	(FIDE) Boris Savchenko	2592	106w0	135b1	50w1	42b½	49w½	83b1	44w½	3w0	51b0	76b0	142w1	108b½	80w0	6	85	90	2506
104	(Kazakhstan) Arystanbek Urazayev	2535	98w1	32w½	30b1	138b1	6w0	58b0	73w0	37b0	126w½	132b½	131w1	57b0	111w½	6	83	88	2567
105	(India) Aravindh Chithambaram	2576	163w1	14w½	8b0	108b1	22w½	106b0	142w½	109b½	79w0	99b1	50w0	115b1	87w0	6	82,5	86,5	2508
106	(India) Sankalp Gupta	2402	103b1	47w½	36b½	61w0	117b1	105w1	90b0	63w0	114b0	130w1	94b0	134w1	60b0	6	79	84,5	2581
107	(Iran) Ehsan Ghaem Maghami	2549	176b0	97w1	149b1	20w½	35b0	154w½	15b0	80w½	111b1	96w0	112b0	132w1	102b½	6	78	81	2490
108	(Austria) Valentin Dragnev	2444	30b½	90w½	66b½	105w0	156b1	114w½	26b0	54w0	139b½	157w1	121b1	103w½	61b0	6	77	81,5	2530
109	(Belgium) Daniel Dardha	2511	4b0	84w0	152b½	158w1	110b1	46w0	139b1	105w½	54b0	154w1	40b0	140w1	62w0	6	77	81	2455
110	(Kazakhstan) Daniyal Sapenov	2312	45w0	53b½	130w0	115b1	109w0	126b1	132w1	72b0	161b½	127w1	114b1	69w0	77b0	6	76,5	82	2514
111	(Kazakhstan) Azamat Utegaliyev	2415	89w1	58w½	47b½	11b0	45w0	113b½	137w0	171b1	107w0	118b0	157b1	145w1	104b½	6	76,5	81	2537
112	(Kazakhstan) Denis Makhnev	2513	124w0	165b1	19w0	177b1	86w½	160b0	93w0	155b1	76w0	135b1	107w1	62b½	78w0	6	75	77,5	2518
113	(Norway) Aryan Tari	2556	156b0	149w0	128b1	131w1	125b0	111w½	135b1	22w0	85b½	119w1	140b1	40w0	84b0	6	74	78,5	2407
114	(FIDE) Alexei Fedorov	2531	172b1	9w0	147b½	154w½	78w½	108b½	83w0	148b1	106w1	73b0	110w0	80b0	150w1	6	74	77,5	2442
115	(Canada) Aman Hambleton	2450	46b½	28w0	52b0	110w0	178b1	157w1	154b½	86b½	81w0	143w½	128b1	105w0	138b1	6	73,5	75	2489
116	(Kazakhstan) Rinat Jumabayev	2531	169w1	56b0	156w1	94w½	47b0	172b1	29w0	70b0	131w1	138b½	86w0	87b0	143w1	6	73	76,5	2471
117	(FIDE) Alexander Riazantsev	2570	157w½	70b1	123w½	27b0	106w0	76b0	165w1	79b0	148w1	126b0	97b0	147w1	144b1	6	72	76	2443
118	(Germany) Frederik Svane	2466	73w½	78b0	70w0	155b0	152w1	85b0	156b0	165w1	167b1	111w1	124b½	138w1	86w0	6	69,5	73,5	2450
119	(FIDE) Aleksej Aleksandrov	2450	31w0	164b0	168w1	124b½	155w1	65b0	172w1	137b0	84w½	113b0	129w0	152b1	140w1	6	66	69,5	2402
120	(FIDE) Sanan Sjugirov	2584	158b1	8w½	14b0	51w½	142b½	37w½	80b1	52w1	26b0	49w0	39b0	99w½	97b0	5,5	89	93	2525
121	(India) Harsha Bharathakoti	2574	85w1	24w0	131b1	19b0	83w0	129b1	37w½	96b0	80w1	70b0	108w0	142b1	92w0	5,5	82,5	87,5	2495
122	(Iran) Pouya Idani	2523	13b0	163w1	139b½	29w-	135w1	81b1	40w½	28w0	94b½	78b0	85w0	125b½	129w½	5,5	80,5	84,5	2511
123	(FIDE) Maxim Matlakov	2671	39b½	161w1	117b½	64w½	88b0	102w½	140b0	145w1	130b1	71w½	23b0	75w0	96b0	5,5	78,5	83,5	2522
124	(Italy) Sabino Brunello	2725	112b1	63w0	49b0	119w½	126b1	130w1	67b½	64w0	93w0	142b½	118w½	127b½	85w0	5,5	76,5	81,5	2488
125	(Kazakhstan) Zhandos Agmanov	2403	100w½	175b1	31w½	40b0	113w1	60b0	82w0	141b0	127w0	165b1	145b½	122w½	134b½	5,5	74,5	78,5	2553
126	(Armenia) Tigran Harutyunyan	2441	16b0	172w1	64b0	81b½	124w0	110w0	166b1	147w1	104b½	117w1	91b½	90w0	94b0	5,5	74,5	78	2521
127	(Montenegro) Denis Kadric	2482	10b0	152w1	90b0	156w½	147b½	176w1	94b0	97w0	125b1	110b0	148w1	124w½	95b0	5,5	71	74	2469
128	(Turkey) Ediz Gürel	2345	41w0	75b0	113w0	153b1	99b0	178w1	150b1	34w0	132w0	149b1	115w0	166b1	136w½	5,5	71	72,5	2434
129	(Kazakhstan) Ramazan Zhalmakhanov	2399	36b0	21b0	172w0	171b1	177w1	121w0	134b1	130w0	145b0	156w1	119b1	77w0	122b½	5,5	70,5	73	2416
130	(Uzbekistan) Jakhongir Vakhidov	2530	8b0	151w½	110b1	162w1	58w0	124b0	148w½	129b1	123w0	106b0	144b0	156w½	155b1	5,5	70	74,5	2506
131	(Mongolia) Dambasuren Batsuren	2430	40w½	86b½	121w0	113b0	146b0	164w½	173b1	156w1	116b0	133w1	104b0	141w1	91b0	5,5	69	72,5	2465
132	(Kazakhstan) Rustam Khusnutdinov	2432	94b0	162w0	167b1	86b0	166w½	156w1	110b0	139w½	128b1	104w½	75b0	107b0	159w1	5,5	68	72	2418
133	(India) Srinath Narayanan	2518	24b0	140w0	146b1	143w½	38b0	163w½	147b½	85w0	155b1	131b0	135w½	139w½	156b1	5,5	68	72	2374
134	(Norway) Johan-Sebastian Christiansen	2513	6w0	93b0	165w1	164b1	68w0	84b0	129w0	163b0	172w1	146b1	143w1	106b0	125w½	5,5	68	71,5	2377
135	(Mongolia) Gombosuren Munkhgal	2413	47b0	103w0	98b½	173w1	122b0	166w1	113w0	172b1	75b0	112w0	133b½	155w½	154b1	5,5	67	70,5	2377
136	(England) Ameet Ghasi	2536	159b½	173w1	28b0	140w0	74b0	146w0	157b½	167w½	156b½	98w0	176b1	165w1	128b½	5,5	62,5	65,5	2293
137	(FIDE) Anton Demchenko	2565	84b1	35w1	10b0	17w0	92b½	74w0	111b1	119w1	22b0	48w0	77b½	83w0	99b0	5	88	94	2511
138	(United States) Sam Shankland	2657	145b1	25w1	63b½	104w0	66b0	52w½	161b1	67w0	34b½	116w½	53b0	118b0	115w0	5	82	87	2520
139	(Mongolia) Munkhdalai Amilal	2225	21w1	2b0	122w½	71b0	95w1	72b0	109w0	132b½	108w½	80b½	99w0	133b½	142w½	5	81	86	2518
140	(FIDE) Maksim Tsaruk	2334	60w0	133b1	21w½	136b1	100w½	45b½	123w1	68b½	41w0	81b0	113w0	109b0	119b0	5	79,5	85	2579
141	(FIDE) Daniil Lintchevski	2520	3b0	85w½	166b½	144w½	143b1	78b½	162w0	125w1	36b0	97w½	98b0	131b0	148w½	5	76,5	80,5	2471
142	(Mongolia) Sumiya Bilguun	2468	17b0	166w½	173b1	54b½	120w½	36w½	105b½	65b½	45w0	124w½	103b0	121w0	139b½	5	76	79,5	2534
143	(FIDE) Vladimir Burmakin	2412	86w½	40b½	60w0	133b½	141w0	171b1	53w0	81b0	152w1	115b½	134b0	167w1	116b0	5	75	79	2492
144	(India) Arjun Kalyan	2426	68w0	160b0	153w1	141b½	82w0	155b0	152w1	98b1	86w½	53b0	130w1	101b0	117w0	5	74	78,5	2473
145	(Spain) Alvar Alonso Rosell	2472	138w0	153b1	40w½	175b1	89w½	68b0	78w0	123b0	129w1	86b0	125w½	111b0	146w½	5	73,5	78,5	2542
146	(FIDE) Lev Zverev	2257	64b0	34b0	133w0	170b1	131w1	136b1	71w0	39w0	99b0	134w0	158b½	157w1	145b½	5	72	75,5	2476
147	(Kyrgyzstan) Melis Mamatov	2299	65w½	72b½	114w½	21b0	127w½	96b0	133w½	126b0	171w0	152b½	172w1	117b0	166w1	5	72	75,5	2420
148	(Bulgaria) Momchil Petkov	2411	43b0	54b½	95w1	66w0	102b0	173w1	130b½	114w0	117b0	163w1	127b0	154w½	141b½	5	71	74,5	2503
149	(Kazakhstan) Petr Kostenko	2404	69b0	113b1	107w0	33w0	176b0	177b1	95w0	153w1	77b0	128w0	156b0	164w1	167b1	5	66,5	69	2387
150	(Kosovo) Nderim Saraçi	2441	5w0	177b0	155w½	152b1	81w0	165b½	128w0	157b½	98w0	169b1	167b½	153w1	114b0	5	65	67,5	2304
151	(Norway) Benjamin Haldorsen	2349	11w0	130b½	54w0	82b0	171w0	167b½	164b½	166w½	177b1	153w0	155b0	169w1	168w1	5	63,5	66	2275
152	(Libya) Ali Elier	2188	67b0	127b0	109w½	150w0	118b0	159w1	144b0	158w1	143b0	147w½	170b1	119w0	165b1	5	63	66,5	2420
153	(Kazakhstan) Abilmansur Abdilkhair	2171	25b0	145w0	144b0	128w0	168w0	170b1	169w1	149b0	159w1	151b1	80w0	150b0	163w1	5	62	65,5	2377
154	(Tajikistan) Mustafokhuja Khusenkhojaev	2161	82w1	36w½	35b0	114b½	72w½	107b½	115w½	101b0	53w½	109b0	87w0	148b½	135w0	4,5	80	85	2526
155	(FIDE) Nikolay Averin	2240	91b0	48w0	150b½	118w1	119b0	144w1	54b0	112w0	133w0	172b½	151w1	135b½	130w0	4,5	71	74,5	2478
156	(Serbia) Vuk Damjanovic	2266	113w1	43w0	116b0	127b½	108w0	132b0	118w1	131b0	136w½	129b0	149w1	130b½	133w0	4,5	70	75	2494
157	(Kazakhstan) Konstantin Kazakov	2311	117b½	61w0	51b0	161w0	167b1	115b0	136w½	150w½	173b1	108b0	111w0	146b0	172w1	4,5	67,5	71	2406
158	(FIDE) Savva Vetokhin	2358	120w0	82b½	175w0	109b0	98w0	169b1	171w0	152b0	170b0	-1	146w½	172b½	173w1	4,5	60,5	63,5	2258
159	(Wales) Elijah Everett	2125	136w½	65b0	53w0	74b0	165w0	152b0	168b½	178w1	153b0	177w½	173b1	170w1	132b0	4,5	60,5	62	2315
160	(FIDE) Aleksandr Rakhmanov	2633	80b0	144w1	39b0	87w1	77b½	112w1	33b0	51w½	-0	-0	-0	-0	-0	4	80,5	85,5	2478
161	(FIDE) Klementy Sychev	2489	81w½	123b0	79w0	157b1	85w1	86b½	138w0	76b½	110w½	84b-	-0	-0	-0	4	74,5	79	2489
162	(Georgia (country)) Baadur Jobava	2688	96w0	132b1	75w½	130b0	172w½	99b1	141b1	91w0	52b0	-0	-0	-0	-0	4	73	76,5	2444
163	(FIDE) Alexander Khripachenko	2348	105b0	122b0	169w1	102w½	52b0	133b½	99w0	134w1	87b0	148b0	166w0	177w1	153b0	4	68	70,5	2400
164	(Kyrgyzstan) Aziz Degenbaev	2039	23b0	119w1	26b0	134w0	97b0	131b½	151w½	87w0	165b0	170w0	178w1	149b0	177b1	4	66,5	68	2390
165	(Uzbekistan) Khumoyun Begmuratov	2292	63b0	112w0	134b0	167w½	159b1	150w½	117b0	118b0	164w1	125w0	169b1	136b0	152w0	4	64	68	2379
166	(Kazakhstan) Edgar Mamedov	2157	55b0	142b½	141w½	77w0	132b½	135b0	126w0	151b½	168w0	173w1	163b1	128w0	147b0	4	64	67,5	2412
167	(Austria) Jakob Postlmayer	2182	101w0	50b0	132w0	165b½	157w0	151w½	178b1	136b½	118w0	168b1	150w½	143b0	149w0	4	62,5	64	2412
168	(Estonia) Andrei Shishkov	2272	66b0	49w0	119b0	169w0	153b1	95b0	159w½	173w0	166b1	167w0	177b½	176w1	151b0	4	60	62,5	2285
169	(Kazakhstan) Ernur Amangeldy	1952	116b0	87w0	163b0	168b1	76w0	158w0	153b0	170w1	176b1	150w0	165w0	151b0	178w1	4	57,5	59	2351
170	(Kosovo) Endrit Uruci	2353	174b0	59w0	178b0	146w0	173b0	153w0	-1	169b0	158w1	164b1	152w0	159b0	176w1	4	55	56,5	2201
171	(Kazakhstan) Sauat Nurgaliyev	2016	71w0	83b0	97b½	129w0	151b1	143w0	158b1	111w0	147b1	-0	-0	-0	-0	3,5	68	72	2403
172	(Kazakhstan) Imangali Akhilbay	1963	114w0	126b0	129b1	99w1	162b½	116w0	119b0	135w0	134b0	155w½	147b0	158w½	157b0	3,5	66,5	70,5	2450
173	(Kazakhstan) Ergali Suleimen	2046	72w½	136b0	142w0	135b0	170w1	148b0	131w0	168b1	157w0	166b0	159w0	178b1	158b0	3,5	58	59,5	2364
174	(Canada) Eric Hansen	2579	170w1	1b0	99w1	93b1	27w0	50b-	-0	-0	-0	-0	-0	-0	-0	3	77	80,5	2544
175	(Azerbaijan) Arkadij Naiditsch	2596	38b½	125w0	158b1	145w0	79b½	92w0	97b0	176w1	-0	-0	-0	-0	-0	3	67,5	70,5	2396
176	(FIDE) Egor Korelskiy	2256	107w1	69w0	59b0	50b0	149w1	127b0	79w0	175b0	169w0	178b1	136w0	168b0	170b0	3	67	68,5	2431

== Women's tournament results ==
The following table lists all participants, with the results from the 13 rounds. They are ranked according to the results, taking into account the tie-breaks.

Notation: "1 (B 58)" indicates a win (1 point) with black pieces (B) against player of rank 58 (Jovana Eric). The first tiebreak (labeled BC1) is the Buchholz Cut 1 score, the second tiebreak (labeled BS) is the Buchholz score, and the third tiebreak (labelled AROC1) is the average rating of opponents cut 1.

Rank	Name	Rating	1	2	3	4	5	6	7	8	9	10	11	Total	BC1	BS	AROC1
1	(China) Tan Zhongyi	2502	1 (B 58)	1 (W 3)	½ (B 24)	1 (W 17)	1 (B 14)	½ (W 12)	½ (B 8)	1 (W 7)	½ (W 4)	½ (B 6)	1 (W 11)	8.5	73.5	79	2363
2	(Kazakhstan) Dinara Saduakassova	2435	½ (B 40)	½ (W 62)	½ (B 43)	½ (W 7)	1 (B 69)	1 (W 37)	1 (B 46)	1 (W 15)	1 (B 16)	1 (W 4)	½ (B 3)	8.5	65.5	70	2269
3	(India) Savitha Shri B	2311	1 (W 94)	0 (B 1)	1 (W 75)	½ (W 39)	1 (B 35)	1 (W 34)	1 (B 19)	1 (W 8)	0 (B 5)	1 (B 13)	½ (W 2)	8	69	72	2347
4	(FIDE) Aleksandra Goryachkina	2484	1 (W 69)	½ (B 37)	½ (W 38)	1 (W 60)	1 (B 24)	½ (B 11)	1 (W 13)	1 (W 12)	½ (B 1)	0 (B 2)	1 (W 14)	8	68.5	73	2353
5	(Kazakhstan) Zhansaya Abdumalik	2448	0 (W 16)	1 (B 87)	1 (W 47)	1 (B 37)	1 (W 91)	1 (W 15)	½ (B 12)	½ (B 11)	1 (W 3)	½ (B 9)	½ (W 6)	8	67.5	71	2334
6	(India) Humpy Koneru	2468												8	66	70.5	2353
7	(FIDE) Alina Bivol	2179												7.5	71.5	76.5	2376
8	(Georgia (country)) Bela Khotenashvili	2405												7.5	69	73	2348
9	(FIDE) Alexandra Kosteniuk	2537												7.5	64	68.5	2334
10	(FIDE) Daria Charochkina	2259												7.5	57	59	2319
11	(Georgia (country)) Nino Batsiashvili	2370												7	71.5	76	2346
12	(Armenia) Elina Danielian	2331												7	71	75.5	2301
13	(Singapore) Gong Qianyun	2315												7	68.5	72.5	2348
14	(FIDE) Valentina Gunina	2389												7	68	72.5	2364
15	(FIDE) Leya Garifullina	2316												7	67.5	71	2312
16	(Mongolia) Turmunkh Munkhzul	2192												7	67	72.5	2380
17	(Azerbaijan) Gulnar Mammadova	2343												7	65.5	69	2253
18	(Poland) Aleksandra Maltsevskaya	2327												7	62.5	67	2218
19	(Bulgaria) Antoaneta Stefanova	2399												7	61.5	66	2263
20	(Georgia (country)) Nana Dzagnidze	2475												7	60.5	65.5	2301
21	(FIDE) Polina Shuvalova	2384												7	58.5	62.5	2241
22	(Georgia (country)) Meri Arabidze	2333												7	55	57	2091
23	(Kazakhstan) Alua Nurmanova	2123												7	53.5	56	2269
24	(FIDE) Olga Girya	2328												6.5	65	69	2324
25	(Germany) Elisabeth Pähtz	2369												6.5	62	66.5	2235
26	(Kazakhstan) Amina Kairbekova	2096												6.5	60.5	64.5	2302
27	(Ukraine) Nataliya Buksa	2260												6.5	60	63	2314
28	(Serbia) Teodora Injac	2333												6.5	58	61.5	2124
29	(Kazakhstan) Bibisara Assaubayeva	2396												6.5	57.5	61.5	2203
30	(Uzbekistan) Umida Omonova	2059												6.5	56.5	60.5	2300
31	(Kazakhstan) Zeinep Sultanbek	1834												6	67	72.5	2366
32	(Azerbaijan) Gunay Mammadzada	2383												6	63.5	68	2235
33	(Azerbaijan) Khanim Balajayeva	2284												6	63	66	2253
34	(Iran) Sarasadat Khademalsharieh	2411												6	62.5	67	2275
35	(Kazakhstan) Zarina Nurgaliyeva	1863												6	62	67	2294
36	(Azerbaijan) Laman Hajiyeva	1996												6	60.5	65	2308
37	(Armenia) Lilit Mkrtchian	2309												6	60	63	2267
38	(India) Padmini Rout	2290												6	59	63	2288
39	(India) Harika Dronavalli	2475												6	59	63	2251
40	(FIDE) Evgenija Ovod	2185												6	58	60.5	2277
41	(Ukraine) Yuliia Osmak	2328												6	49	53	2139
42	(FIDE) Daria Voit	2312												5.5	65	68.5	2330
43	(Germany) Lara Schulze	2198												5.5	63.5	66.5	2295
44	(Azerbaijan) Ulviyya Fataliyeva	2322												5.5	61.5	65	2228
45	(Turkey) Ekaterina Atalik	2385												5.5	60	64	2234
46	(United States) Atousa Pourkashiyan	2256												5.5	59.5	63.5	2312
47	(FIDE) Olga Badelka	2238												5.5	59.5	63	2242
48	(Armenia) Mariam Mkrtchyan	2274												5.5	58.5	63	2281
49	(Ukraine) Anna Ushenina	2371												5.5	58.5	62.5	2177
50	(India) Tania Sachdev	2318												5.5	58	62	2179
51	(FIDE) Kateryna Lagno	2531												5.5	57	61	2224
52	(Georgia (country)) Lela Javakhiskvili	2364												5.5	57	61	2204
53	(Azerbaijan) Govhar Beydullayeva	2256												5.5	57	60.5	2159
54	(United States) Gulrukhbegim Tokhirjonova	2326												5.5	55.5	59.5	2173
55	(Uzbekistan) Afruza Khamdamova	2052												5.5	53.5	56.5	2243
56	(FIDE) Anna Shukhman	2061												5.5	53	57.5	2275
57	(Kazakhstan) Ayaulym Kaldarova	1824												5.5	52.5	56.5	2221
58	(Serbia) Jovana Eric	2199												5.5	49.5	52	2092
59	(Armenia) Susanna Gaboyan	2157												5.5	49.5	51.5	2073
60	(Kazakhstan) Meruert Kamalidenova	2259												5	63.5	64.5	2356
61	(Georgia (country)) Sopio Tereladze	2054												5	60	64	2310
62	(FIDE) Baira Kovanova	2241												5	55.5	57.5	2104
63	(Mongolia) Davaademberel Nomin-Erdene	2304												5	55	57.5	2197
64	(England) Yao Lan	2283												5	53	56.5	2095
65	(China) Lu Miaoyi	2181												5	52.5	56	2207
66	(Czech Republic) Anna Lhotska	2196												5	48.5	51.5	2166
67	(Kazakhstan) Liya Kurmangaliyeva	2114												4.5	61.5	66.5	2283
68	(Uzbekistan) Nafisa Muminova	2242												4.5	60.5	64.5	2307
69	(Georgia (country)) Sofio Gvetadze	2198												4.5	58.5	62	2207
70	(Kazakhstan) Xeniya Balabayeva	2067												4.5	56.5	59.5	2262
71	(FIDE) Ekaterina Borisova	2107												4.5	56.5	57.5	2237
72	(Kazakhstan) Alfia Nasybullina	2077												4.5	56	60	2248
73	(Kazakhstan) Nazerke Nurgali	2079												4.5	54	57.5	2272
74	(Mongolia) Altan-Ulzii Enkhtuul	2195												4.5	52.5	55.5	2162
75	(Philippines) Janelle Mae Frayna	2134												4.5	52	55	2125
76	(FIDE) Anastasya Paramzina	2148												4.5	49.5	52	2145
77	(FIDE) Viktoriia Kirchei	1998												4.5	46	49	2077
78	(Ukraine) Irina Petrova	2125												4	57	61	2349
79	(Mongolia) Tumurbaatar Nomindalai	2042												4	52	56	2246
80	(FIDE) Galina Mikheeva	2095												4	49.5	51.5	2070
81	(Malaysia) Siti Zulaikha Foudzi	2126												4	48.5	51	2132
82	(FIDE) Irina Mikhaylova	2064												4	46.5	48.5	2021
83	(Kazakhstan) Kristina Kim	1832												4	45.5	48.5	2116
84	(Mongolia) Khishigbaatar Bayasgalan	1812												4	45	46	2059
85	(Kazakhstan) Aidana Madi	1709												4	44.5	47.5	2104
86	(Kazakhstan) Asiya Assylkhan	1360												4	41	42	2021
87	(Kazakhstan) Assel Serikbay	2084												3.5	56.5	59.5	2228
88	(Norway) Monika Machlik	2073												3.5	48	49	2083
89	(Kazakhstan) Elnaz Kaliakhmet	1712												3.5	45.5	49	2113
90	(FIDE) Olga Druzhinina	2010												3.5	42.5	43.5	1998
91	(United States) Anna Zatonskih	2268												3	58	62	2316
92	(Ukraine) Inna Gaponenko	2340												3	51.5	54	2120
93	(Kazakhstan) Arnash Bauyrzhan	1941												3	48	50.5	2099
94	(Kazakhstan) Bakhyt Balakanova	1947												3	46	47	2058
95	(Brazil) Marina Martins De Aguiar	1763												3	42.5	43.5	1992
96	(Kyrgyzstan) Aleksandra Samaganova	1883												2.5	45	46	2113
97	(Kazakhstan) Gulnar Balakanova	1754												2	46	47	2056
98	(United States) Jocelyn Chen	1754												1.5	35	35.5	1897
