= Chess at the 2022 Asian Games – Men's team standard =

Men's team standard at the 2022 Asian Games
- Venue: Hangzhou Chess Academy
- Date: 29 September – 7 October 2023
- Competitors: 61 from 13 nations

Medalists
gold medal	Iran; Parham Maghsoudloo, Amin Tabatabaei, Pouya Idani, Bardia Daneshvar, Amir Reza Pouraghabala
silver medal	India; Gukesh Dommaraju, R Praggnanandhaa, Vidit Gujrathi, Arjun Erigaisi, Pentala Harikrishna
bronze medal	Uzbekistan; Nodirbek Abdusattorov, Javokhir Sindarov, Nodirbek Yakubboev, Jakhongir Vakhidov, Shamsiddin Vokhidov

The men's team competition at the 2022 Asian Games in Hangzhou was held from 29 September to 7 October 2023 at the Hangzhou Qi-Yuan Hall.

== Schedule ==
All times are China Standard Time (UTC+08:00)

Date	Time	Event
Friday, 29 September 2023	15:00	Round 1
Saturday, 30 September 2023	15:00	Round 2
Sunday, 1 October 2023	15:00	Round 3
Monday, 2 October 2023	15:00	Round 4
Tuesday, 3 October 2023	15:00	Round 5
Wednesday, 4 October 2023	15:00	Round 6
Thursday, 5 October 2023	15:00	Round 7
Friday, 6 October 2023	15:00	Round 8
Sunday, 7 October 2023	15:00	Round 9

== Results ==
=== Round 1 ===
	Score	
India	3½–½	Mongolia
Gukesh Dommaraju	½–½	Sumiyaagiin Bilgüün
R Praggnanandhaa	1–0	Tsegmediin Batchuluun
Vidit Gujrathi	1–0	Sugaryn Gan-Erdene
Arjun Erigaisi	1–0	Ganzorigiin Amartüvshin
Philippines	1–3	China
Paulo Bersamina	0–1	Wei Yi
John Paul Gomez	½–½	Bu Xiangzhi
Darwin Laylo	½–½	Ma Qun
Jem Garcia	0–1	Xu Xiangyu
Iran	2½–1½	Bangladesh
Parham Maghsoudloo	1–0	Enamul Hossain
Pouya Idani	½–½	Mohammad Fahad Rahman
Bardia Daneshvar	1–0	Ziaur Rahman
Amir Reza Pouraghabala	0–1	Niaz Murshed
Kyrgyzstan	1–3	Uzbekistan
Eldiar Orozbaev	0–1	Nodirbek Abdusattorov
Mikhail Markov	0–1	Nodirbek Yakubboev
Ruslan Sezdbekov	½–½	Jakhongir Vakhidov
Erzhan Zhakshylykov	½–½	Shamsiddin Vokhidov
Vietnam	3½–½	South Korea
Lê Quang Liêm	1–0	Lee Jun-hyeok
Lê Tuấn Minh	½–½	Kwon Se-hyun
Trần Tuấn Minh	1–0	Lee Kyung-seok
Trần Minh Thắng	1–0	Gu In-jung
Thailand	½–3½	Kazakhstan
Prin Laohawirapap	0–1	Alisher Suleymenov
Thanadon Kulpruethanon	½–½	Ramazan Zhalmakhanov
Warot Kananub	0–1	Kazybek Nogerbek
Tinnakrit Arunnuntapanich	0–1	Aldiyar Ansat
Hong Kong	2–2	Bye
	½–½	
	½–½	
	½–½	
	½–½	

=== Round 2 ===
	Score	
Uzbekistan	2–2	India
Nodirbek Abdusattorov	½–½	Gukesh Dommaraju
Javokhir Sindarov	½–½	R Praggnanandhaa
Nodirbek Yakubboev	½–½	Vidit Gujrathi
Shamsiddin Vokhidov	½–½	Arjun Erigaisi
China	2–2	Vietnam
Wei Yi	½–½	Lê Quang Liêm
Bu Xiangzhi	½–½	Nguyễn Ngọc Trường Sơn
Ma Qun	½–½	Lê Tuấn Minh
Xu Xiangyu	½–½	Trần Tuấn Minh
Kazakhstan	1–3	Iran
Rinat Jumabayev	½–½	Parham Maghsoudloo
Alisher Suleymenov	0–1	Amin Tabatabaei
Ramazan Zhalmakhanov	½–½	Pouya Idani
Aldiyar Ansat	0–1	Bardia Daneshvar
Mongolia	4–0	Hong Kong
Tsegmediin Batchuluun	1–0	Daniel Lam
Sugaryn Gan-Erdene	1–0	Niilo Nissinen
Ganzorigiin Amartüvshin	1–0	Li Yiheng
Gombosürengiin Mönkhgal	1–0	Jamison Kao
South Korea	1–3	Philippines
Lee Jun-hyeok	½–½	Paulo Bersamina
Kwon Se-hyun	½–½	John Paul Gomez
Lee Kyung-seok	0–1	Darwin Laylo
Ahn Hong-jin	0–1	Jem Garcia
Bangladesh	1½–2½	Kyrgyzstan
Enamul Hossain	0–1	Eldiar Orozbaev
Mohammad Fahad Rahman	1–0	Mikhail Markov
Ziaur Rahman	½–½	Ruslan Sezdbekov
Niaz Murshed	0–1	Erzhan Zhakshylykov
Thailand	2–2	Bye
	½–½	
	½–½	
	½–½	
	½–½	

=== Round 3 ===
	Score	
Iran	2½–1½	China
Parham Maghsoudloo	1–0	Wei Yi
Amin Tabatabaei	½–½	Bu Xiangzhi
Pouya Idani	½–½	Ma Qun
Bardia Daneshvar	½–½	Xu Xiangyu
Vietnam	1–3	Uzbekistan
Lê Quang Liêm	1–0	Nodirbek Abdusattorov
Nguyễn Ngọc Trường Sơn	0–1	Javokhir Sindarov
Lê Tuấn Minh	0–1	Nodirbek Yakubboev
Trần Tuấn Minh	0–1	Shamsiddin Vokhidov
India	3–1	Kazakhstan
Gukesh Dommaraju	1–0	Rinat Jumabayev
R Praggnanandhaa	1–0	Alisher Suleymenov
Arjun Erigaisi	½–½	Ramazan Zhalmakhanov
Pentala Harikrishna	½–½	Kazybek Nogerbek
Philippines	½–3½	Mongolia
Paulo Bersamina	0–1	Sumiyaagiin Bilgüün
John Paul Gomez	0–1	Tsegmediin Batchuluun
Darwin Laylo	½–½	Ganzorigiin Amartüvshin
Jem Garcia	0–1	Gombosürengiin Mönkhgal
Kyrgyzstan	2½–1½	Thailand
Eldiar Orozbaev	0–1	Prin Laohawirapap
Semetey Tologontegin	1–0	Thanadon Kulpruethanon
Ruslan Sezdbekov	½–½	Warot Kananub
Erzhan Zhakshylykov	1–0	Tinnakrit Arunnuntapanich
Hong Kong	½–3½	Bangladesh
Daniel Lam	0–1	Enamul Hossain
Kwong Wing Ki	0–1	Mohammad Fahad Rahman
Niilo Nissinen	0–1	Ziaur Rahman
Li Yiheng	½–½	Niaz Murshed
South Korea	2–2	Bye
	½–½	
	½–½	
	½–½	
	½–½	

=== Round 4 ===
	Score	
Uzbekistan	1½–2½	Iran
Nodirbek Abdusattorov	½–½	Parham Maghsoudloo
Javokhir Sindarov	0–1	Amin Tabatabaei
Nodirbek Yakubboev	½–½	Pouya Idani
Shamsiddin Vokhidov	½–½	Bardia Daneshvar
Kyrgyzstan	½–3½	India
Eldiar Orozbaev	0–1	Gukesh Dommaraju
Semetey Tologontegin	0–1	Vidit Gujrathi
Ruslan Sezdbekov	½–½	Arjun Erigaisi
Erzhan Zhakshylykov	0–1	Pentala Harikrishna
Mongolia	½–3½	Vietnam
Sumiyaagiin Bilgüün	0–1	Lê Quang Liêm
Tsegmediin Batchuluun	½–½	Nguyễn Ngọc Trường Sơn
Sugaryn Gan-Erdene	0–1	Lê Tuấn Minh
Gombosürengiin Mönkhgal	0–1	Trần Tuấn Minh
China	2½–1½	Kazakhstan
Wei Yi	1–0	Rinat Jumabayev
Bu Xiangzhi	0–1	Ramazan Zhalmakhanov
Ma Qun	½–½	Kazybek Nogerbek
Xu Xiangyu	1–0	Aldiyar Ansat
Bangladesh	2–2	South Korea
Enamul Hossain	1–0	Lee Jun-hyeok
Mohammad Fahad Rahman	0–1	Kwon Se-hyun
Ziaur Rahman	0–1	Gu In-jung
Niaz Murshed	1–0	Ahn Hong-jin
Thailand	3½–½	Hong Kong
Prin Laohawirapap	1–0	Daniel Lam
Thanadon Kulpruethanon	1–0	Kwong Wing Ki
Warot Kananub	1–0	Li Yiheng
Tinnakrit Arunnuntapanich	½–½	Jamison Kao
Philippines	2–2	Bye
	½–½	
	½–½	
	½–½	
	½–½	

=== Round 5 ===
	Score	
Iran	2–2	India
Parham Maghsoudloo	1–0	Gukesh Dommaraju
Amin Tabatabaei	0–1	R Praggnanandhaa
Pouya Idani	½–½	Vidit Gujrathi
Bardia Daneshvar	½–½	Pentala Harikrishna
Uzbekistan	2–2	China
Nodirbek Abdusattorov	½–½	Wei Yi
Javokhir Sindarov	½–½	Bu Xiangzhi
Jakhongir Vakhidov	0–1	Ma Qun
Shamsiddin Vokhidov	1–0	Xu Xiangyu
Vietnam	3½–½	Kyrgyzstan
Lê Quang Liêm	½–½	Semetey Tologontegin
Nguyễn Ngọc Trường Sơn	1–0	Mikhail Markov
Lê Tuấn Minh	1–0	Ruslan Sezdbekov
Trần Tuấn Minh	1–0	Erzhan Zhakshylykov
Bangladesh	½–3½	Mongolia
Enamul Hossain	½–½	Sumiyaagiin Bilgüün
Mohammad Fahad Rahman	0–1	Tsegmediin Batchuluun
Ziaur Rahman	0–1	Sugaryn Gan-Erdene
Niaz Murshed	0–1	Ganzorigiin Amartüvshin
Thailand	2½–1½	Philippines
Prin Laohawirapap	½–½	Paulo Bersamina
Thanadon Kulpruethanon	½–½	John Paul Gomez
Warot Kananub	1–0	Darwin Laylo
Tinnakrit Arunnuntapanich	½–½	Jem Garcia
South Korea	3–1	Hong Kong
Kwon Se-hyun	1–0	Daniel Lam
Lee Kyung-seok	0–1	Niilo Nissinen
Gu In-jung	1–0	Li Yiheng
Ahn Hong-jin	1–0	Jamison Kao
Kazakhstan	2–2	Bye
	½–½	
	½–½	
	½–½	
	½–½	

=== Round 6 ===
	Score	
Vietnam	2–2	Iran
Lê Quang Liêm	0–1	Parham Maghsoudloo
Nguyễn Ngọc Trường Sơn	½–½	Amin Tabatabaei
Lê Tuấn Minh	1–0	Pouya Idani
Trần Tuấn Minh	½–½	Bardia Daneshvar
India	2–2	China
Gukesh Dommaraju	½–½	Wei Yi
R Praggnanandhaa	½–½	Bu Xiangzhi
Vidit Gujrathi	½–½	Ma Qun
Pentala Harikrishna	½–½	Xu Xiangyu
Mongolia	1–3	Uzbekistan
Sumiyaagiin Bilgüün	½–½	Nodirbek Abdusattorov
Tsegmediin Batchuluun	0–1	Javokhir Sindarov
Sugaryn Gan-Erdene	½–½	Nodirbek Yakubboev
Ganzorigiin Amartüvshin	0–1	Shamsiddin Vokhidov
South Korea	2½–1½	Thailand
Lee Jun-hyeok	1–0	Prin Laohawirapap
Kwon Se-hyun	0–1	Thanadon Kulpruethanon
Gu In-jung	½–½	Warot Kananub
Ahn Hong-jin	1–0	Tinnakrit Arunnuntapanich
Kazakhstan	3½–½	Kyrgyzstan
Rinat Jumabayev	1–0	Eldiar Orozbaev
Alisher Suleymenov	½–½	Semetey Tologontegin
Ramazan Zhalmakhanov	1–0	Mikhail Markov
Kazybek Nogerbek	1–0	Ruslan Sezdbekov
Hong Kong	0–4	Philippines
Daniel Lam	0–1	Paulo Bersamina
Kwong Wing Ki	0–1	John Paul Gomez
Niilo Nissinen	0–1	Darwin Laylo
Jamison Kao	0–1	Jem Garcia
Bangladesh	2–2	Bye
	½–½	
	½–½	
	½–½	
	½–½	

=== Round 7 ===
	Score	
Iran	2½–1½	Mongolia
Parham Maghsoudloo	½–½	Sumiyaagiin Bilgüün
Amin Tabatabaei	1–0	Tsegmediin Batchuluun
Pouya Idani	½–½	Sugaryn Gan-Erdene
Bardia Daneshvar	½–½	Gombosürengiin Mönkhgal
India	2½–1½	Vietnam
Gukesh Dommaraju	½–½	Lê Quang Liêm
R Praggnanandhaa	½–½	Nguyễn Ngọc Trường Sơn
Vidit Gujrathi	½–½	Lê Tuấn Minh
Arjun Erigaisi	1–0	Trần Tuấn Minh
Uzbekistan	4–0	South Korea
Javokhir Sindarov	1–0	Lee Jun-hyeok
Nodirbek Yakubboev	1–0	Kwon Se-hyun
Jakhongir Vakhidov	1–0	Gu In-jung
Shamsiddin Vokhidov	1–0	Ahn Hong-jin
China	4–0	Thailand
Wei Yi	1–0	Prin Laohawirapap
Bu Xiangzhi	1–0	Thanadon Kulpruethanon
Ma Qun	1–0	Warot Kananub
Xu Xiangyu	1–0	Tinnakrit Arunnuntapanich
Philippines	2½–1½	Bangladesh
Paulo Bersamina	½–½	Enamul Hossain
John Paul Gomez	½–½	Mohammad Fahad Rahman
Darwin Laylo	1–0	Ziaur Rahman
Jem Garcia	½–½	Niaz Murshed
Kazakhstan	4–0	Hong Kong
Alisher Suleymenov	1–0	Kwong Wing Ki
Ramazan Zhalmakhanov	1–0	Niilo Nissinen
Kazybek Nogerbek	1–0	Li Yiheng
Aldiyar Ansat	1–0	Jamison Kao
Kyrgyzstan	2–2	Bye
	½–½	
	½–½	
	½–½	
	½–½	

=== Round 8 ===
	Score	
Philippines	1–3	Iran
Paulo Bersamina	0–1	Parham Maghsoudloo
John Paul Gomez	0–1	Amin Tabatabaei
Darwin Laylo	1–0	Pouya Idani
Jem Garcia	0–1	Bardia Daneshvar
South Korea	½–3½	India
Lee Jun-hyeok	0–1	Gukesh Dommaraju
Kwon Se-hyun	0–1	R Praggnanandhaa
Gu In-jung	0–1	Arjun Erigaisi
Ahn Hong-jin	½–½	Pentala Harikrishna
Uzbekistan	3½–½	Kazakhstan
Nodirbek Abdusattorov	1–0	Rinat Jumabayev
Javokhir Sindarov	1–0	Alisher Suleymenov
Nodirbek Yakubboev	1–0	Ramazan Zhalmakhanov
Shamsiddin Vokhidov	½–½	Aldiyar Ansat
Kyrgyzstan	½–3½	China
Eldiar Orozbaev	0–1	Wei Yi
Semetey Tologontegin	0–1	Bu Xiangzhi
Mikhail Markov	0–1	Ma Qun
Ruslan Sezdbekov	½–½	Xu Xiangyu
Hong Kong	0–4	Vietnam
Kwong Wing Ki	0–1	Nguyễn Ngọc Trường Sơn
Niilo Nissinen	0–1	Lê Tuấn Minh
Li Yiheng	0–1	Trần Tuấn Minh
Jamison Kao	0–1	Trần Minh Thắng
Thailand	1½–2½	Bangladesh
Prin Laohawirapap	½–½	Enamul Hossain
Thanadon Kulpruethanon	0–1	Mohammad Fahad Rahman
Warot Kananub	1–0	Ziaur Rahman
Tinnakrit Arunnuntapanich	0–1	Niaz Murshed
Mongolia	2–2	Bye
	½–½	
	½–½	
	½–½	
	½–½	

=== Round 9 ===
	Score	
Iran	4–0	South Korea
Parham Maghsoudloo	1–0	Lee Jun-hyeok
Amin Tabatabaei	1–0	Kwon Se-hyun
Pouya Idani	1–0	Gu In-jung
Bardia Daneshvar	1–0	Ahn Hong-jin
India	3½–½	Philippines
R Praggnanandhaa	½–½	Paulo Bersamina
Vidit Gujrathi	1–0	John Paul Gomez
Arjun Erigaisi	1–0	Darwin Laylo
Pentala Harikrishna	1–0	Jem Garcia
Thailand	0–4	Uzbekistan
Prin Laohawirapap	0–1	Nodirbek Abdusattorov
Thanadon Kulpruethanon	0–1	Javokhir Sindarov
Warot Kananub	0–1	Nodirbek Yakubboev
Tinnakrit Arunnuntapanich	0–1	Jakhongir Vakhidov
China	3½–½	Mongolia
Wei Yi	1–0	Sumiyaagiin Bilgüün
Bu Xiangzhi	½–½	Sugaryn Gan-Erdene
Ma Qun	1–0	Ganzorigiin Amartüvshin
Xu Xiangyu	1–0	Gombosürengiin Mönkhgal
Bangladesh	1–3	Kazakhstan
Enamul Hossain	½–½	Alisher Suleymenov
Mohammad Fahad Rahman	0–1	Ramazan Zhalmakhanov
Ziaur Rahman	½–½	Kazybek Nogerbek
Niaz Murshed	0–1	Aldiyar Ansat
Hong Kong	½–3½	Kyrgyzstan
Daniel Lam	½–½	Eldiar Orozbaev
Kwong Wing Ki	0–1	Semetey Tologontegin
Niilo Nissinen	0–1	Mikhail Markov
Li Yiheng	0–1	Erzhan Zhakshylykov
Vietnam	2–2	Bye
	½–½	
	½–½	
	½–½	
	½–½	

=== Summary ===
Rank	Team	Round									Total	GP	HH
Rank	Team	1	2	3	4	5	6	7	8	9	Total	GP	HH
1st place, gold medalist(s)	Iran (IRI)	2	2	2	2	1	1	2	2	2	16	24	
2nd place, silver medalist(s)	India (IND)	2	1	2	2	1	1	2	2	2	15	25½	
3rd place, bronze medalist(s)	Uzbekistan (UZB)	2	1	2	0	1	2	2	2	2	14	26	
4	China (CHN)	2	1	0	2	1	1	2	2	2	13	24	
5	Vietnam (VIE)	2	1	0	2	2	1	0	2	1	11	23	
6	Kazakhstan (KAZ)	2	0	0	0	1	2	2	0	2	9	20	
7	Mongolia (MGL)	0	2	2	0	2	0	0	1	0	7	17	
8	Philippines (PHI)	0	2	0	1	0	2	2	0	0	7	16	
9	Kyrgyzstan (KGZ)	0	2	2	0	0	0	1	0	2	7	13½	
10	Bangladesh (BAN)	0	0	2	1	0	1	0	2	0	6	16	
11	South Korea (KOR)	0	0	1	1	2	2	0	0	0	6	11½	
12	Thailand (THA)	0	1	0	2	2	0	0	0	0	5	13	
13	Hong Kong (HKG)	1	0	0	0	0	0	0	0	0	1	4½	
