= List of Asian Games medalists in chess =

This is the complete list of Asian Games medalists in chess from 2006 to 2022.

== Rapid ==
=== Men's individual ===
Games	Gold	Silver	Bronze
2006 Doha	Murtas Kazhgaleyev (KAZ)	Đào Thiên Hải (VIE)	Bu Xiangzhi (CHN)
2010 Guangzhou	Rustam Kasimdzhanov (UZB)	Lê Quang Liêm (VIE)	Bu Xiangzhi (CHN)
2022 Hangzhou	Wei Yi (CHN)	Nodirbek Abdusattorov (UZB)	Javokhir Sindarov (UZB)

=== Women's individual ===
Games	Gold	Silver	Bronze
2006 Doha	Koneru Humpy (IND)	Zhao Xue (CHN)	Zhu Chen (QAT)
2010 Guangzhou	Hou Yifan (CHN)	Zhao Xue (CHN)	Harika Dronavalli (IND)
2022 Hangzhou	Zhu Jiner (CHN)	Umida Omonova (UZB)	Hou Yifan (CHN)

== Standard ==
=== Men's team ===
Games	Gold	Silver	Bronze
2010 Guangzhou	China (CHN); Wang Yue; Wang Hao; Bu Xiangzhi; Zhou Jianchao; Ni Hua	Philippines (PHI); Wesley So; Rogelio Antonio; John Paul Gomez; Darwin Laylo; Eugene Torre	India (IND); Pentala Harikrishna; Krishnan Sasikiran; Surya Shekhar Ganguly; Geetha Narayanan Gopal; Adhiban Baskaran
2022 Hangzhou	Iran (IRI); Parham Maghsoudloo; Amin Tabatabaei; Pouya Idani; Bardia Daneshvar; Amir Reza Pouraghabala	India (IND); Gukesh Dommaraju; R Praggnanandhaa; Vidit Gujrathi; Arjun Erigaisi; Pentala Harikrishna	Uzbekistan (UZB); Nodirbek Abdusattorov; Javokhir Sindarov; Nodirbek Yakubboev; Jakhongir Vakhidov; Shamsiddin Vokhidov

=== Women's team ===
Games	Gold	Silver	Bronze
2010 Guangzhou	China (CHN); Hou Yifan; Ju Wenjun; Zhao Xue; Huang Qian; Wang Yu	Uzbekistan (UZB); Nafisa Muminova; Olga Sabirova; Yulduz Hamrakulova; Nodira Nodirjanova	Vietnam (VIE); Hoàng Thị Bảo Trâm; Phạm Lê Thảo Nguyên; Nguyễn Thị Thanh An; Nguyễn Thị Mai Hưng; Nguyễn Thị Tường Vân
2022 Hangzhou	China (CHN); Hou Yifan; Zhu Jiner; Tan Zhongyi; Zhai Mo	India (IND); Koneru Humpy; Harika Dronavalli; Vaishali Rameshbabu; Vantika Agrawal; Savitha Shri Baskar	Kazakhstan (KAZ); Bibisara Assaubayeva; Meruert Kamalidenova; Zhansaya Abdumalik; Dinara Saduakassova; Alua Nurmanova

=== Mixed team ===
Games	Gold	Silver	Bronze
2006 Doha	India (IND); Krishnan Sasikiran; Pentala Harikrishna; Koneru Humpy	China (CHN); Bu Xiangzhi; Wang Yue; Zhao Xue	Iran (IRI); Ehsan Ghaemmaghami; Elshan Moradi; Atousa Pourkashian
