= Chess at the 2022 Asian Games =

Asian Games competition

- Venue: Hangzhou Chess Academy
- Dates: 24 September – 7 October 2023
- Competitors: 134 from 21 nations

The chess event at the 2022 Asian Games was held in Hangzhou Chess Academy (Hangzhou Qiyuan Chess Hall), Hangzhou, China, from 24 September to 7 October 2023.

China won gold medals in three of the four events (men's individual rapid, women's individual rapid and women's team), while Iran won gold in the men's team event. India won silver in both team events while competitors from Uzbekistan won silver in both rapid events.

== Schedule ==
| ● | Round | ● | Last round |

| Event↓/Date → | 24th Sun | 25th Mon | 26th Tue | 27th Wed | 28th Thu | 29th Fri | 30th Sat | 1st Sun | 2nd Mon | 3rd Tue | 4th Wed | 5th Thu | 6th Fri | 7th Sat |
|---|---|---|---|---|---|---|---|---|---|---|---|---|---|---|
| Men's individual rapid | ●● | ●● | ●●● | ●● | | | | | | | | | | |
| Men's team standard | | | | | | ● | ● | ● | ● | ● | ● | ● | ● | ● |
| Women's individual rapid | ●● | ●● | ●●● | ●● | | | | | | | | | | |
| Women's team standard | | | | | | ● | ● | ● | ● | ● | ● | ● | ● | ● |

== Medalists ==
| Event | Gold | Silver | Bronze |
|---|---|---|---|
| Men's individual rapid | Wei Yi; China | Nodirbek Abdusattorov; Uzbekistan | Javokhir Sindarov; Uzbekistan |
| Men's team standard | Iran; Parham Maghsoudloo; Amin Tabatabaei; Pouya Idani; Bardia Daneshvar; Amir Reza Pouraghabala | India; Gukesh Dommaraju; R Praggnanandhaa; Vidit Gujrathi; Arjun Erigaisi; Pentala Harikrishna | Uzbekistan; Nodirbek Abdusattorov; Javokhir Sindarov; Nodirbek Yakubboev; Jakhongir Vakhidov; Shamsiddin Vokhidov |
| Women's individual rapid | Zhu Jiner; China | Umida Omonova; Uzbekistan | Hou Yifan; China |
| Women's team standard | China; Hou Yifan; Zhu Jiner; Tan Zhongyi; Zhai Mo | India; Koneru Humpy; Harika Dronavalli; Vaishali Rameshbabu; Vantika Agrawal; Savitha Shri Baskar | Kazakhstan; Bibisara Assaubayeva; Meruert Kamalidenova; Zhansaya Abdumalik; Dinara Saduakassova; Alua Nurmanova |

== Medal table ==
| Rank | Nation | Gold | Silver | Bronze | Total |
|---|---|---|---|---|---|
| 1 | China (CHN) | 3 | 0 | 1 | 4 |
| 2 | Iran (IRI) | 1 | 0 | 0 | 1 |
| 3 | Uzbekistan (UZB) | 0 | 2 | 2 | 4 |
| 4 | India (IND) | 0 | 2 | 0 | 2 |
| 5 | Kazakhstan (KAZ) | 0 | 0 | 1 | 1 |
| Totals (5 entries) | | 4 | 4 | 4 | 12 |

== Participating nations ==
A total of 134 athletes from 21 nations competed in chess at the 2022 Asian Games:

- Bangladesh (5)
- China (8)
- Chinese Taipei (2)
- Hong Kong (10)
- India (10)
- Indonesia (7)
- Iran (6)
- Japan (2)
- Kazakhstan (10)
- Kuwait (2)
- Kyrgyzstan (5)
- Mongolia (10)
- Philippines (9)
- Qatar (3)
- Singapore (1)
- South Korea (10)
- Sri Lanka (1)
- Thailand (8)
- United Arab Emirates (5)
- Uzbekistan (10)
- Vietnam (10)
