= Fang Yuxiang =

Chinese chess grandmaster (born 1996)

Personal information
- Born: February 29, 1996 (age 30) Shanxi, China

Chess career
- Country: China
- Title: Grandmaster (2017)
- FIDE rating: 2444 (July 2026)
- Peak rating: 2510 (December 2016)

Fang Yuxiang (Chinese: 房宇翔; born February 29, 1996) is a Chinese chess grandmaster.

== Chess career ==
In February 2016, Fang won the Chess in Kecskemét tournament in Hungary, earning his final GM norm.

In September 2017, he finished second in the IGB Dato Arthur Tan International Open Chess Championship, behind Trần Tuấn Minh.

=== Controversy ===
At the Malaysia Chess Festival in September 2019, Fang was suspected of cheating after arbiters spotted him with a phone in his hand after he left the toilet. The phone was confiscated and it was found that the Stockfish app had been recently deleted. However, the last usage of the app was just minutes before the tournament began, indicating that cheating during the event may not have occurred. Regardless, Fang was disqualified and ejected from the tournament for not surrendering his phone to organizers in the playing hall. He has not played classical chess since then.
