= Amirreza Pour Agha Bala =

Iranian chess player (born 2004)

Personal information
- Born: May 15, 2004 (age 22) Tabriz, Iran

Chess career
- Country: Iran
- Title: International Master (2025)
- FIDE rating: 2449 (July 2026)
- Peak rating: 2523 (June 2023)

Amirreza Pour Agha Bala is an Iranian chess player.

== Chess career ==
In October 2022, he tied for first place with grandmaster Manuel Petrosyan in the ChessMood Open, ultimately placing second after tiebreaks.

He won the Iranian Chess Championship in 2023.

In October 2023, he played for Iran in the 2022 Asian Games (alongside Parham Maghsoodloo, Amin Tabatabaei, Pouya Idani, and Bardiya Daneshvar), where the team won the gold medal in the men's team classical event.
