= Ganzorigiin Amartüvshin =

Mongolian chess player (born 2005)

Personal information
- Born: 18 February 2005 (age 21)

Chess career
- Country: Mongolia
- Title: International Master (2022)
- FIDE rating: 2443 (July 2026)
- Peak rating: 2436 (May 2026)

Ganzorigiin Amartüvshin (Mongolian: Ганзоригийн Амартүвшин; born 14 February 2005) is a Mongolian chess International Master. He became a Candidate Master in 2013 at age 8, a FIDE Master in 2016 at age 11, and an International Master in 2022 at age 17.

Amartuvshin participated in the Chess World Cup 2023, where he was knocked out by Eduardo Iturrizaga in the first round with a 2½-1½ loss.
