= Eldiar Orozbaev =

Kyrgyzstani chess player (born 2006)

Personal information
- Born: 2006 (age 19–20) Bishkek, Kyrgyzstan

Chess career
- Country: Kyrgyzstan
- Title: International Master (2024)
- Peak rating: 2421 (November 2024)

Eldiar Orozbaev is a Kyrgyzstani chess player.

== Chess career ==
In May 2024, he tied for second place with Asyl Abdyjapar in the Kyrgyzstani Chess Championship. He was ranked in third place after tiebreak scores.

In June 2024, he was one of five players who got off to a perfect start in the first four rounds of the Asian Youth Chess Championship.

In February 2025, he tied with Asyl Abdyjapar and Semetei Tologon Tegin in the Kyrgyzstani Chess Championship. After tiebreak scores were applied, he played Abdyzhapar in a rapid tiebreak match and prevailed, becoming the national champion.
