= Daria Voit =

Russian chess player (born 1994)

Personal information
- Born: Daria Stanislavovna Voit; 11 January 1994 (age 32) Moscow, Russia

Chess career
- Country: Russia
- Title: Woman Grandmaster (2017)
- Peak rating: 2427 (November 2016)

Daria Stanislavovna Voit (Russian: Дарья Станиславовна Войт; née Pustovoitova, Russian: Пустовойтова; born 11 January 1994) is a Russian chess player who holds the title of Woman Grandmaster (WGM).

== Career ==
In 2014 she won the Russian Junior Girls Championship. The following year, Voit won the women's section of the European Universities Chess Championships in Yerevan. In 2016 she won the Moscow women's blitz championship and the Moscow women's rapid championship. In 2016, in Novosibirsk, Voit tied for 4th-7th places in the Russian Women's Championship Superfinal.
