= Ramazan Zhalmakhanov =

Kazakhstani chess grandmaster (born 2002)

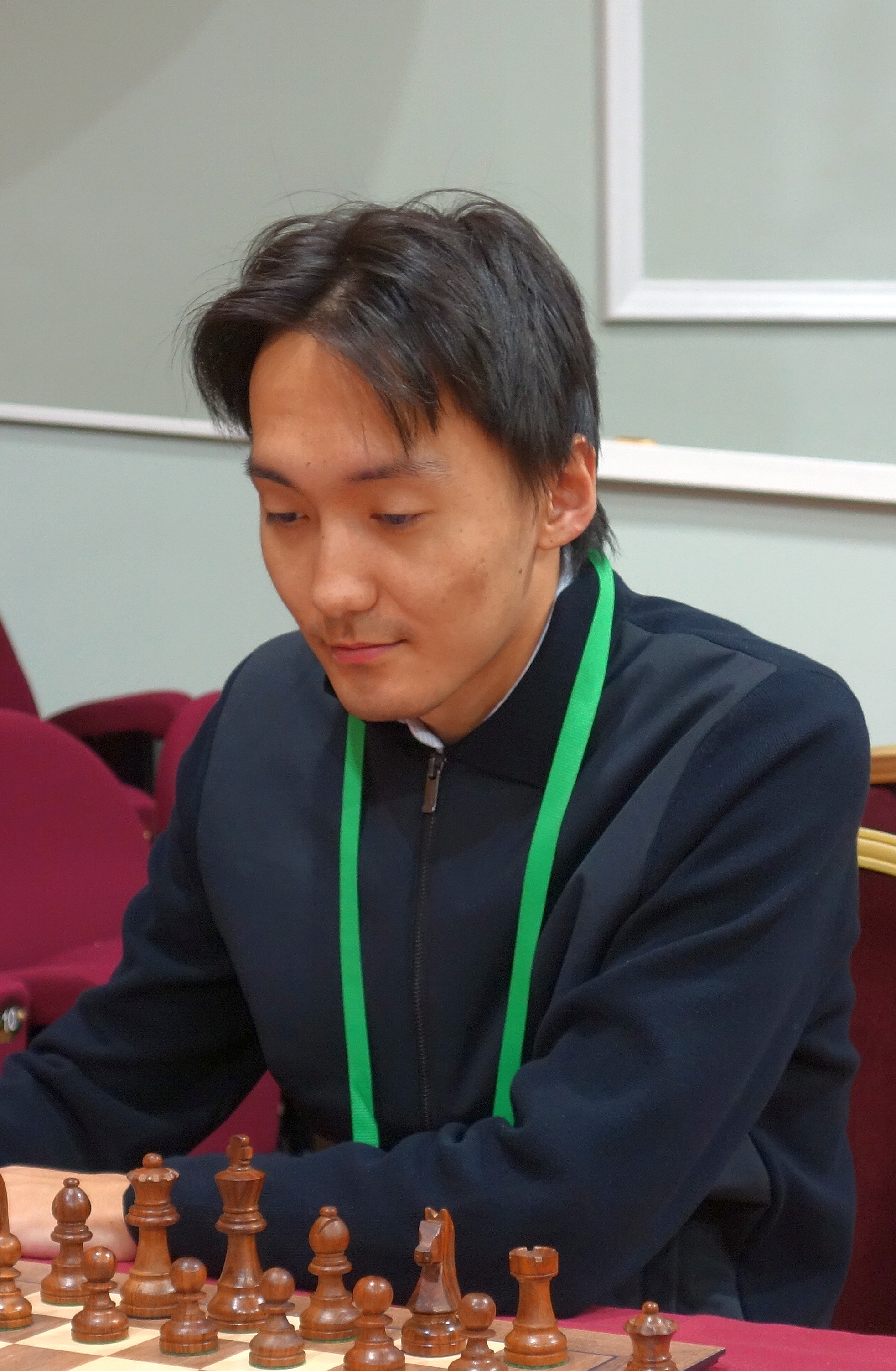
- Zhalmakhanov in 2023

Personal information
- Born: November 6, 2002 (age 23) Almaty, Kazakhstan

Chess career
- Country: Kazakhstan
- Title: Grandmaster (2024)
- FIDE rating: 2478 (July 2026)
- Peak rating: 2510 (July 2024)

Ramazan Talgatuly Zhalmakhanov (Kazakh: Рамазан Талғатұлы Жалмаханов; born 6 November 2002) is a Kazakhstani chess grandmaster. He was awarded the FIDE master title in 2017 and the international master title in 2021.

== Chess career ==
Zhalmakhanov played in the FIDE Online Chess Olympiad 2021 as part of Kazakhstan's juniors team. The team faced the American team in the first quarterfinals, where Zhalmakhanov defeated grandmaster Awonder Liang. The team took first place in Group A of the Top Division.

Zhalmakhanov played for Kazakhstan in the team section of the 2022 Asian Games. They faced India in the third round, where he held super-grandmaster Arjun Erigaisi to a draw.

Zhalmakhanov competed in the FIDE Grand Swiss Tournament 2023. In the first two rounds of the event, he defeated grandmasters Alan Pichot and Bassem Amin, both of whom were rated over 200 points higher than him. He then held super-grandmaster Alireza Firouzja to a draw in the third round. He finished the event in 69th place out of 114 competitors, with a score of 5/11.

Zhalmakhanov competed in the 2024 Sardinia World Chess Festival, placing 16th with a score of 6/9. With a performance rating of 2614, he gained 15.2 rating points to pass the 2500 rating barrier for the first time. This also marked his final GM norm, and he was formally awarded the GM title in August 2024.
