= Gombosuren Munkhgal =

Mongolian chess grandmaster (born 1988)

Personal information
- Born: September 6, 1988 (age 37) Ulaanbaatar, Mongolia

Chess career
- Country: Mongolia
- Title: Grandmaster (2020)
- Peak rating: 2502 (October 2020)

Gombosuren Munkhgal is a Mongolian chess grandmaster.

== Chess career ==
He played for Mongolia in the:

- 40th Chess Olympiad on board 4, scoring +3=3-3
- 41st Chess Olympiad on the first reserve board, scoring +3=2-2

He won the Mongolian Chess Championship in 2015 and 2016.

He was awarded the Grandmaster title in 2020, after achieving his norms at the:

- Chess in Kecskemet GM in August 2015
- Ikh Nuudel in September 2016
- Mix 3rd Saturday 120 in November 2019

In May 2023, he finished as runner-up in the Mongolian Chess Championship.
