= Edgar Mamedov =

Kazakhstani chess grandmaster (born 2010)

Personal information
- Born: June 18, 2010 (age 16) Aktau, Mangystau Region, Kazakhstan

Chess career
- Country: Kazakhstan
- Title: Grandmaster (2025)
- FIDE rating: 2459 (July 2026)
- Peak rating: 2509 (June 2025)

Edgar Mamedov (Russian: Эдгар Мамедов; born 18 June 2010) is a Kazakhstani chess grandmaster.

== Chess career ==
In November 2024, he won the silver medal in the U14 section of the World Youth Chess Championship.

In May 2025, he qualified for the Grandmaster title at the age of 14, becoming the youngest Kazakhstani player to qualify for the title.

In August 2025, he played for Kazakhstan's National School of Physics and Math in the World Schools Team Chess Championship, where the team earned the silver medal and he won a bronze medal in the individual portion.

In October 2025, he won the U16 section of the World Youth Chess Championship.
