= Daniil Lintchevski =

Russian chess grandmaster (born 1990)

Personal information
- Born: Daniil Lvovich Lintchevski; May 17, 1990 (age 36) Leningrad, Russian SFSR, Soviet Union

Chess career
- Country: Russia
- Title: Grandmaster (2009)
- FIDE rating: 2499 (September 2026)
- Peak rating: 2579 (August 2015)

Daniil Lvovich Lintchevski (Russian: Даниил Львович Линчевский; born May 17, 1990) is a Russian chess player who holds the FIDE title of Grandmaster (2009).

== Chess career ==
Daniil Lintchevski started to play chess at the age of 5. He participated in various youth tournaments and in 2005 achieved the FIDE Master title. In 2006 Daniil Lintchevski divided 3-7th place in the U16 European Championship in Herceg Novi and achieved the FIDE International Master title. He won U18 Championship of Russia in 2007 and Championship of the Northwestern Federal District in 2008.

Other results in international tournaments: FINEC — 2007 (Saint Petersburg) — 1st place; FINEC — 2008 A (Saint Petersburg) — 3rd place; FINEC — 2009 A (Saint Petersburg) — divided 2-4th place; Open Latvian Chess Championship - 2009 — 1st place.
