= Trần Tuấn Minh =

Vietnamese chess grandmaster (born 1997)

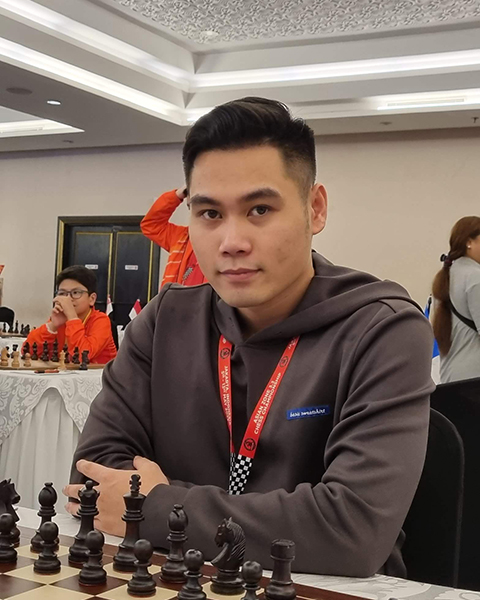

Personal information
- Born: 1 January 1997 (age 29) Hanoi, Vietnam

Chess career
- Country: Vietnam
- Title: Grandmaster (2017)
- FIDE rating: 2412 (July 2026)
- Peak rating: 2558 (October 2017)

Trần Tuấn Minh (born 1 January 1997) is a Vietnamese chess Grandmaster (GM) (2017), five-times Vietnamese Chess Championships winner (2017, 2018, 2021, 2022, 2023).

== Chess Career ==
In 2014, he was awarded the FIDE International Master (IM) title and received the FIDE Grandmaster (GM) title three years later.

Trần Tuấn Minh 5 times won Vietnamese Chess Championships in 2017, 2018, 2021n 2022 and 2023.

He won 02 gold medals at the 2017 Asian Youth Chess Championship in Iran.

Trần Tuấn Minh won the 14th IGB Dato Arthur Tan International Open Chess Championship 2017.

Trần Tuấn Minh won Bhopal GM Open 2018.

Trần Tuấn Minh won the 1st Pattaya Open 2018 in Thailand.

Trần Tuấn Minh played for Vietnam in the Chess Olympiad:

- In 2018, at third board in the 43rd Chess Olympiad in Batumi (+4, =4, -3).

Trần Tuấn Minh played for Vietnam in the 2021 SEA Games and won the Men Team Gold medal with Le Quang Liem
