= Momchil Petkov =

Bulgarian chess grandmaster (born 2005)

Personal information
- Born: November 11, 2005 (age 20) Dobrich, Bulgaria

Chess career
- Country: Bulgaria
- Title: Grandmaster (2022)
- FIDE rating: 2535 (November 2026)
- Peak rating: 2549 (November 2024)

Momchil Petkov is a Bulgarian chess grandmaster.

== Chess career ==
In February 2023, he finished in third place in the Bulgarian Chess Championship. He finished behind winner Kiril Georgiev and runner-up Nurgyul Salimova.

In September 2023, he remained undefeated after the first seven games of the U20 World Youth Chess Championship.

In the November 2023 rankings, he broke into the top 100 juniors, being ranked as the No. 61 junior player.
