= Alisher Suleymenov =

Kazakhstani chess grandmaster (born 2000)

Personal information
- Born: 5 August 2000 (age 26) Pavlodar, Pavlodar Region, Kazakhstan

Chess career
- Country: Kazakhstan
- Title: Grandmaster (2023)
- FIDE rating: 2508 (November 2026)
- Peak rating: 2523 (March 2026)

Älışer Ermekūly Süleimenov (Note: Often transliterated as Alisher Yermekuly Suleymenov through a Russified Romanization of Алишер Ермекулы Сулейменов.) (Kazakh: Әлішер Ермекұлы Сүлейменов; born 5 August 2000) is a Kazakh chess player who received the Grandmaster (GM) title in 2023. He had an upset victory over Magnus Carlsen in the second-round game of the 2023 Qatar Masters.

== Chess career ==
Suleymenov shared first place in the 2019 Suetin Memorial. He won the 2020 Moscow Team Champion and the 2020 Almaty Online Chess Festival. He shared first place in both the RTU Open 2019-H Closing blitz tournament and the Kazakhstan U-20 Championship.

He finished third in the 2022 Paracin Open 'A' chess tournament behind R Praggnanandhaa and Alexandr Predke.

Suleymenov played in the 2023 Chess World Cup, where he was defeated by Carlos Daniel Albornoz Cabrera in the first round.

In October 2023, Suleymenov (then rated 2512) defeated the current #1 rated player and former World Chess Champion Magnus Carlsen in the 2nd round of the Qatar Masters 2023 tournament. Carlsen's previous loss to a player rated below 2520 under classical time controls was to Berge Østenstad in the 2006 Norwegian Championship; Carlsen responded saying, “I was completely crushed in my game today.”

== Personal life ==
Suleymenov is also a chess coach. He speaks Russian and English.
