= Aldiyar Ansat =

Kazakhstani chess grandmaster (born 2008)

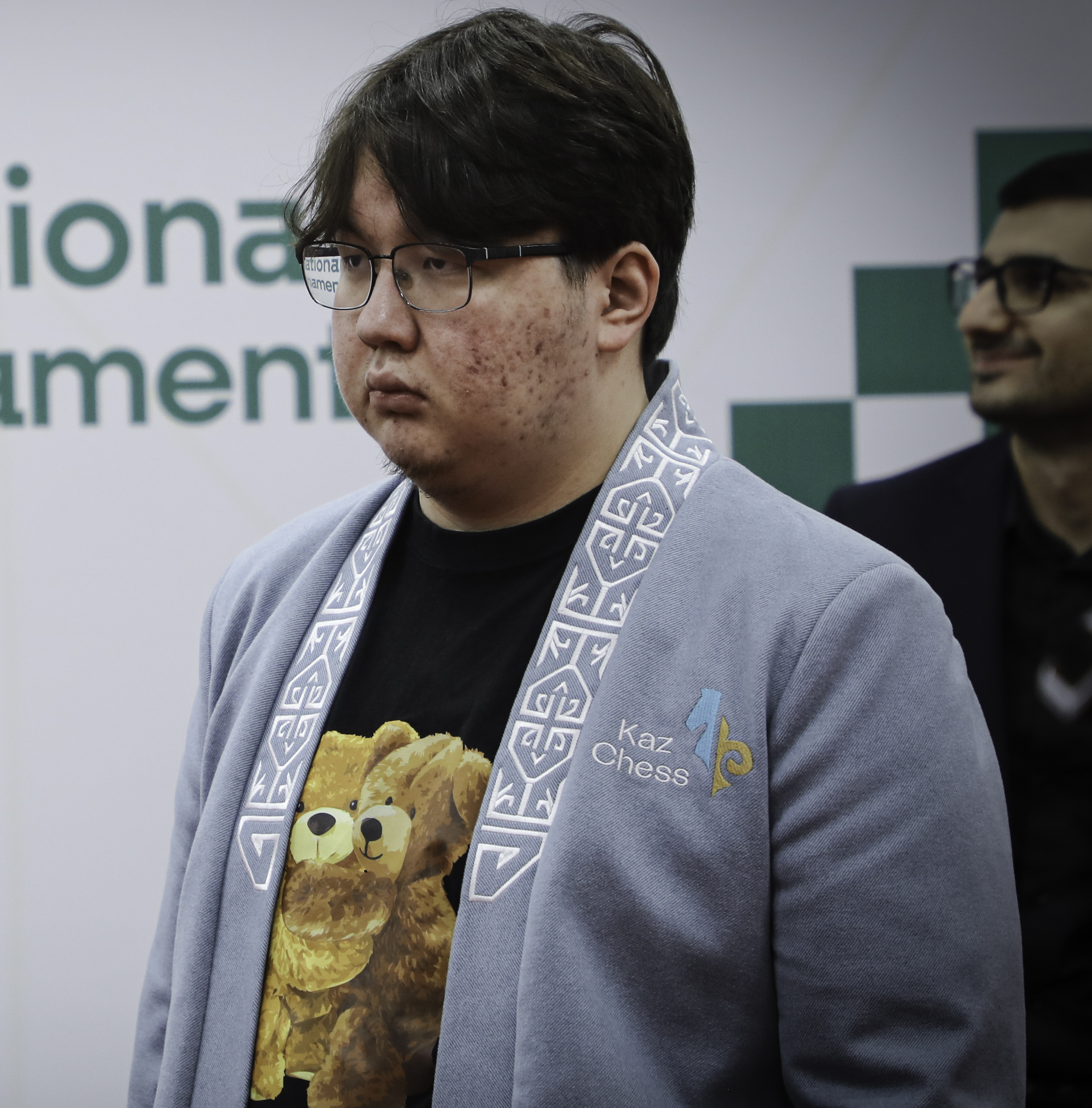

Personal information
- Born: July 15, 2008 (age 18) Astana, Kazakhstan

Chess career
- Country: Kazakhstan
- Title: Grandmaster (2026)
- FIDE rating: 2485 (October 2026)
- Peak rating: 2505 (November 2026)

Aldiar Añsat (Note: Often transliterated as Aldiyar Ansat through a Russified Romanization) (Kazakh: Алдияр Аңсат; born July 15, 2008) is a Kazakhstani chess grandmaster.

== Chess career ==
In December 2023, he won the Kazakhstani Chess Championship, prevailing over Arystanbek Urazaev and grandmaster Denis Makhnev after the rapid tiebreak games.

In April 2025, he won the Asian Zonal 3.4 Chess Championship, earning the right to play in the Chess World Cup 2025.

He participated in the Chess World Cup 2025. In the first round, he held grandmaster Jorge Cori to draws in both their classical games, but was eliminated on rapid tiebreaks.

In July 2026, he crossed the 2500 rating mark and secured the Grandmaster title.

== Personal life ==
He attends the School Lyceum No. 70 in Astana.
