= Parham Maghsoodloo =

Iranian chess grandmaster (born 2000)

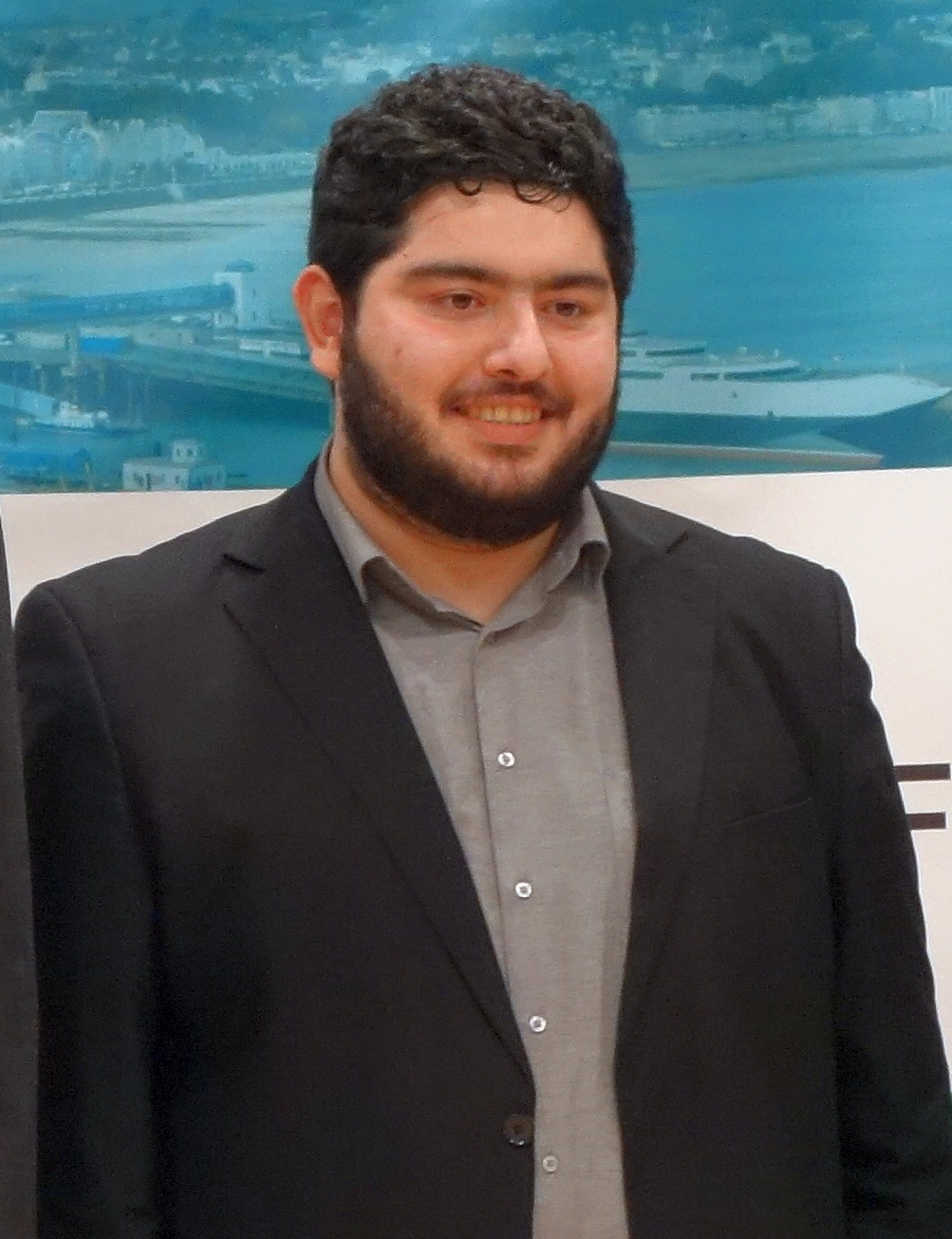
- Maghsoodloo in 2023

Personal information
- Born: 12 August 2000 (age 26) Gorgan, Iran

Chess career
- Country: Iran
- Title: Grandmaster (2016)
- FIDE rating: 2705 (August 2026)
- Peak rating: 2742 (December 2023)
- Ranking: No. 30 (August 2026)
- Peak ranking: No. 12 (December 2023)

Parham Maghsoodloo (Persian: پرهام مقصودلو, born 12 August 2000) is an Iranian chess grandmaster. He was awarded the title of Grandmaster by FIDE in 2016. Maghsoodloo is a three-time Iranian national champion and became the World Junior Chess Champion in 2018.

== Early life and chess career ==
Maghsoodloo was born in 2000 in Gorgan. He played in the 2015 FIDE World Cup, where he was defeated in the first round by Wesley So. The following year, Maghsoodloo was awarded the titles of International Master and Grandmaster by FIDE, and represented his nation at the 42nd Chess Olympiad. He won the Iranian Chess Championship in 2017, 2018 and 2021. Also in 2018, he won the World Junior Chess Championship with a game in hand, finishing with a score of 9½/11, a point ahead of his nearest competitors. His performance rating was 2823.

Maghsoodloo competed in the Tata Steel Challengers in January 2019, placing eighth with a score of 7/13 (+4–3=6).

In August 2026, Maghsoodloo was diagnosed with acute appendicitis. However, he delayed the appendectomy procedure to play in the last chance qualifier of the 2026 Esports World Cup. He qualified for the play-in tournament but was eliminated in the lower/loser's bracket semifinal.

== Selected achievements ==
- Iranian Chess Championship (2017, 2018, 2021)
- Sharjah Masters (2018)
- World Junior Chess Championship (2018)
- Asian Games Team's Event (2023)
- Reykjavík Open (2025)
