= Bardiya Daneshvar =

Iranian chess grandmaster (born 2006)

Personal information
- Born: June 21, 2006 (age 20) Rasht, Iran

Chess career
- Country: Iran; Georgia (2014–2015)
- Title: Grandmaster (2023)
- FIDE rating: 2572 (July 2026)
- Peak rating: 2640 (June 2025)
- Peak ranking: No. 87 (June 2025)

Bardiya Daneshvar (Persian: بردیا دانشور; born June 21, 2006) is an Iranian chess grandmaster.

== Chess career ==
In June 2022, Daneshvar was the winner of the Iranian Men's Final Chess Championship, ahead of top seed Seyed Khalil Mousavi.

In October 2022, Daneshvar represented Iran at the World Youth U16 Olympiad. He drew against Indian Pranav V, causing Iran and India to draw against each other.

In June 2023, Daneshvar finished second in the Asian Continental Chess Championship, behind winner Shamsiddin Vokhidov.

Daneshvar played in the Chess World Cup 2023, where he defeated Mahammad Muradli in the first round and then caused an upset by defeating super-grandmaster Alexander Grischuk (the tournament's 12th seed) in the second round. Daneshvar was then defeated by Salem Saleh in the third round.

He pushed above 2600 in the FIDE rating list in May 2024 by winning the 7th Sharjah Masters despite being the 50th seed. He finished above much stronger players such as Arjun Erigaisi, Alexey Sarana and Yu Yangyi. In continental events he has acquired a gold medal representing Iran at the 2022 Asian Games and gone on to become the individual Asian champion in 2025.
