= Amin Tabatabaei =

Iranian chess grandmaster (born 2001)

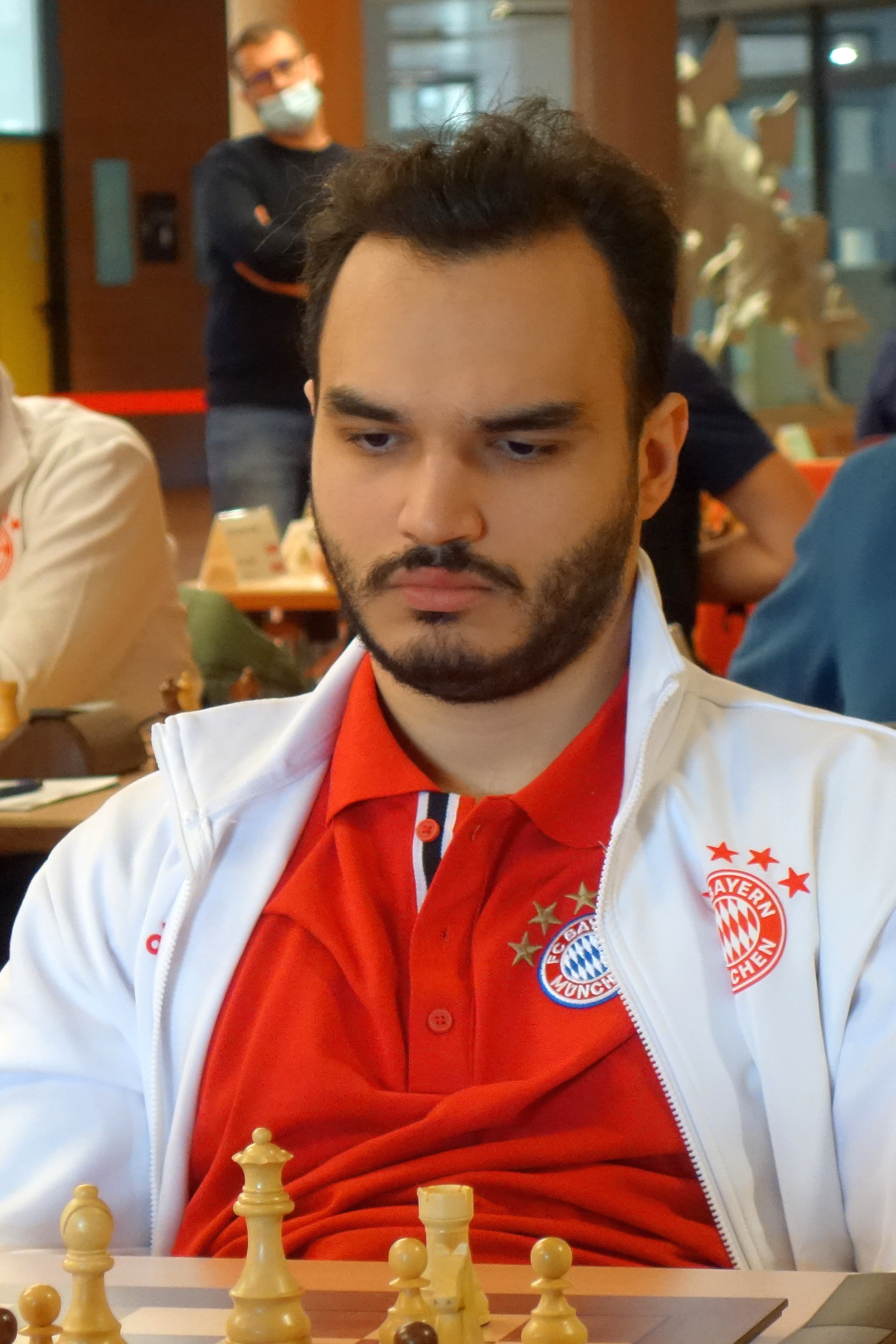
- Amin Tabatabaei in 2023

Personal information
- Born: Seyyed Mohammad Amin Tabatabaei; 5 February 2001 (age 25) Tehran, Iran

Chess career
- Country: Iran
- Title: Grandmaster (2018)
- FIDE rating: 2726 (August 2026)
- Peak rating: 2737 (September 2026)
- Ranking: No. 20 (August 2026)
- Peak ranking: No. 15 (September 2026)

Seyyed Mohammad Amin Tabatabaei (Persian: محمدامین طباطبایی; born 5 February 2001) is an Iranian chess grandmaster. He has represented Iran in three Chess Olympiads (2018, 2022 and 2024).

== Chess career ==
Born in 2001, Tabatabaei earned his international master (IM) title in 2015 and was awarded his grandmaster (GM) title by FIDE in April 2018. In February 2018, he participated in the Aeroflot Open. He finished seventeenth out of ninety-two, scoring 5½/9 (+5–3=1), earning an additional GM norm in the process.

Tabatabaei competed in the Asian Chess Championship in December 2018. He finished second on 6½/9 (+4–0=5), and thus qualified for the Chess World Cup 2019. He won the Biel Masters in July 2019 with 7/9 (+6–1=2) and the Josef Kupper Memorial in August 2019 with 6/7 (+5–0=2). At the Chess World Cup in September, he defeated Bassem Amin in the first round, then was eliminated by Jeffery Xiong in the second round.

He qualified again for the Chess World Cup 2021 where, ranked 86th, he eliminated Basheer Al Qudaimi 2.5-1.5 in the first round, Ferenc Berkes by the same score in the second round, 22nd-seed Yu Yangyi 1.5-0.5 in the third round, 11th-seed Pentala Harikrishna 1.5-0.5 in the fourth round, and Haik M. Martirosyan 2.5-1.5 in the fifth round, before losing to Vladimir Fedoseev 0.5-1.5 in the quarter-final. By reaching the quarter-finals, he secured a place in the FIDE Grand Prix 2022 tournament.

Through February and March 2022, Tabatabaei played in the FIDE Grand Prix 2022. In the second leg, he tied for second with Nikita Vitiugov in Pool B with a 3/6 result. In the third leg, he won his pool with a 3.5/6 result, advancing to the semifinals to face Wesley So and ultimately earning sixth place in the tournament series overall.

In December 2022, Tabatabaei won 3rd place in the 2022 Chessable Sunway Sitges Chess Festival after losing armageddon in 2nd place playoffs to Hans Niemann.

In 2024, he won the Aeroflot Open. In 2026, he won the Reykjavik Open.
