= World Rapid Chess Championship 2025 =

Chess tournament in Doha, Qatar

FIDE World Rapid Championship
- 2025
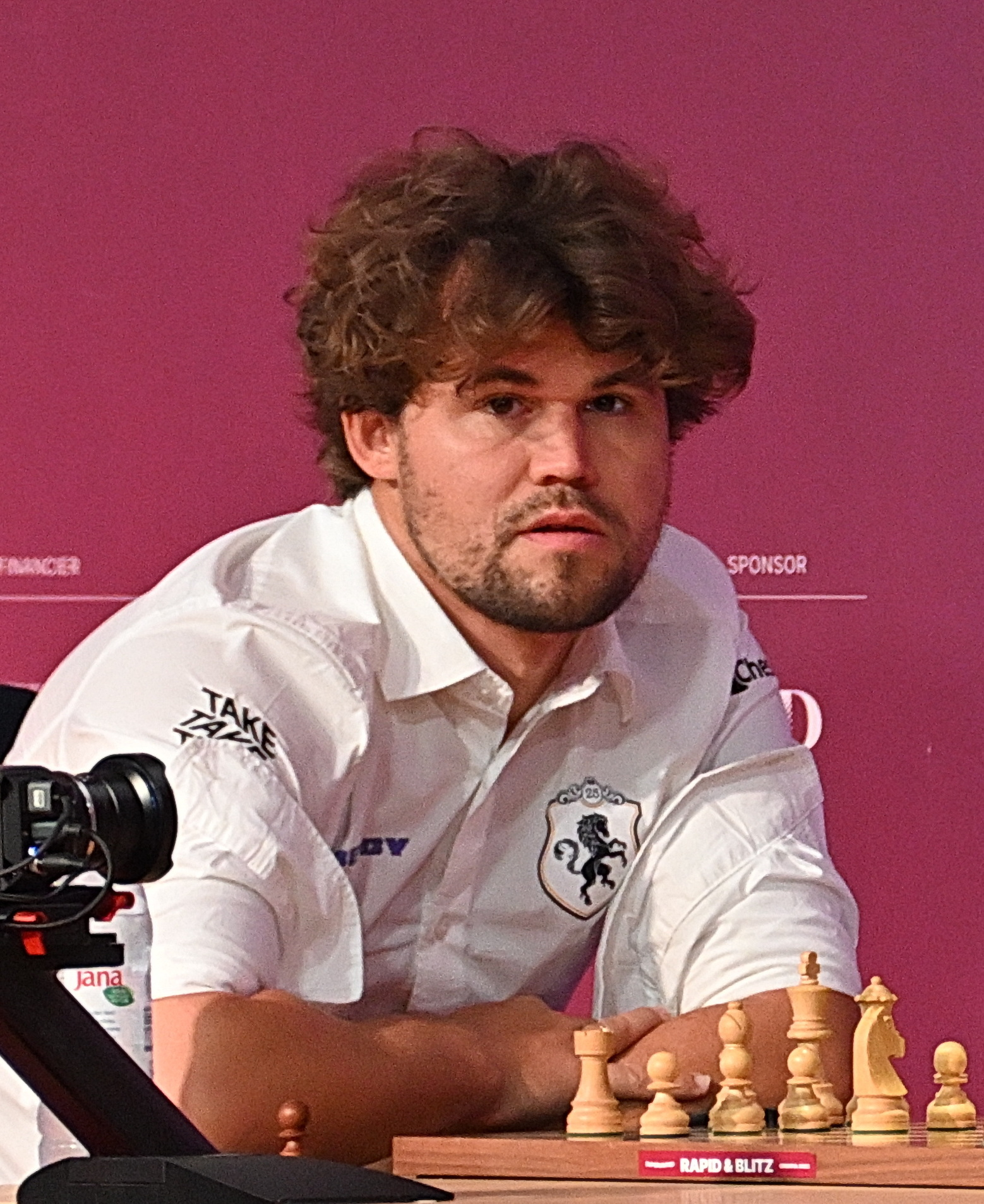
- Magnus Carlsen, winner of the World Rapid Championship 2025

Tournament information
- Dates: December 26, 2025–December 28, 2025
- Format: Rapid (15+10)
- Host: Qatar
- Venue: Sports and Events Complex, Qatar University, Doha, Qatar

Final positions
- Champion: (Norway) Magnus Carlsen

FIDE World Rapid Championship 2025 was the 27th World Rapid Chess Championship tournament. The tournament was held in Doha, Qatar, along with Women's World Rapid Chess Championship 2025, World Blitz Chess Championship 2025 and Women's World Blitz Chess Championship 2025. Magnus Carlsen won the rapid championship for the sixth time, scoring 10½/13, one point more than the rest of the field.

== Schedule ==
| Date | Event | Time | |
| Date | Event | AST (Local) | UTC |
|---|---|---|---|
| December 25 | Arrivals | Whole day | |
| December 25 | Media Day | Whole day | |
| December 25 | Technical Meeting | | |
| December 26 | Opening Ceremony | 1:00 pm | 10:00 am |
| December 26 | Round 1 | 2:00 pm | 11:00 am |
| December 26 | Round 2 | 3:20 pm | 12:20 pm |
| December 26 | Round 3 | 4:40 pm | 1:40 pm |
| December 26 | Round 4 | 6:00 pm | 3:00 pm |
| December 26 | Round 5 | 7:20 pm | 4:20 pm |
| December 27 | Round 6 | 2:00 pm | 11:00 am |
| December 27 | Round 7 | 3:20 pm | 12:20 pm |
| December 27 | Round 8 | 4:40 pm | 1:40 pm |
| December 27 | Round 9 | 6:00 pm | 3:00 pm |
| December 28 | Round 10 | 2:00 pm | 11:00 am |
| December 28 | Round 11 | 3:20 pm | 12:20 pm |
| December 28 | Round 12 | 4:40 pm | 1:40 pm |
| December 28 | Round 13 | 6:00 pm | 3:00 pm |
| December 28 | Play-offs (if needed) | 7:30 pm | 4:30 pm |
| December 29 | No event | | |
| December 30 | Closing Ceremony | 9:00 pm | 6:00 pm |
| December 31 | Departure | Whole day | |

== Players ==
Note:

- On February 27, 2022, in response to the Russian invasion of Ukraine, FIDE banned the display of Russian and Belarusian flags. As a result, some Russian and Belarusian chess players play under the FIDE flag. Others have switched to different chess federations.
- Players of Taiwan play under the Chinese Taipei flag.

| Seed Rank | Player | Federation | Title |
|---|---|---|---|
| 1 | Magnus Carlsen | Norway | Grandmaster |
| 2 | Ian Nepomniachtchi | FIDE | Grandmaster |
| 3 | Levon Aronian | United States | Grandmaster |
| 4 | Fabiano Caruana | United States | Grandmaster |
| 5 | Maxime Vachier-Lagrave | France | Grandmaster |
| 6 | Vladislav Artemiev | FIDE | Grandmaster |
| 7 | Nodirbek Abdusattorov | Uzbekistan | Grandmaster |
| 8 | Richard Rapport | Hungary | Grandmaster |
| 9 | Jan-Krzysztof Duda | Poland | Grandmaster |
| 10 | Arjun Erigaisi | India | Grandmaster |
| 11 | Leinier Dominguez Perez | United States | Grandmaster |
| 12 | Wesley So | United States | Grandmaster |
| 13 | Shakhriyar Mamedyarov | Azerbaijan | Grandmaster |
| 14 | Yangyi Yu | China | Grandmaster |
| 15 | Gukesh D | India | Grandmaster |
| 16 | Daniil Dubov | FIDE | Grandmaster |
| 17 | Javokhir Sindarov | Uzbekistan | Grandmaster |
| 18 | Nihal Sarin | India | Grandmaster |
| 19 | Anish Giri | Netherlands | Grandmaster |
| 20 | R Praggnanandhaa | India | Grandmaster |
| 21 | Alexander Grischuk | FIDE | Grandmaster |
| 22 | Jaime Santos Latasa | Spain | Grandmaster |
| 23 | Dmitry Andreikin | FIDE | Grandmaster |
| 24 | Teimour Radjabov | Azerbaijan | Grandmaster |
| 25 | Parham Maghsoodloo | Iran | Grandmaster |
| 26 | Samuel Sevian | United States | Grandmaster |
| 27 | Radoslaw Wojtaszek | Poland | Grandmaster |
| 28 | Ray Robson | United States | Grandmaster |
| 29 | Vincent Keymer | Germany | Grandmaster |
| 30 | Quang Liem Le | Vietnam | Grandmaster |
| 31 | Jose Eduardo Martinez Alcantara | Mexico | Grandmaster |
| 32 | Baadur Jobava | Georgia | Grandmaster |
| 33 | Volodar Murzin | FIDE | Grandmaster |
| 34 | Olexandr Bortnyk | Ukraine | Grandmaster |
| 35 | Nils Grandelius | Sweden | Grandmaster |
| 36 | Ruslan Ponomariov | Ukraine | Grandmaster |
| 37 | Jorden Van Foreest | Netherlands | Grandmaster |
| 38 | Alexey Sarana | Serbia | Grandmaster |
| 39 | Vasyl Ivanchuk | Ukraine | Grandmaster |
| 40 | Andrey Esipenko | FIDE | Grandmaster |
| 41 | Eltaj Safarli | Azerbaijan | Grandmaster |
| 42 | Shant Sargsyan | Armenia | Grandmaster |
| 43 | Raunak Sadhwani | India | Grandmaster |
| 44 | Salem Saleh | United Arab Emirates | Grandmaster |
| 45 | Pentala Harikrishna | India | Grandmaster |
| 46 | David Anton Guijarro | Spain | Grandmaster |
| 47 | Rasmus Svane | Germany | Grandmaster |
| 48 | Rauf Mamedov | Azerbaijan | Grandmaster |
| 49 | Maksim Chigaev | Spain | Grandmaster |
| 50 | Haik M. Martirosyan | Armenia | Grandmaster |
| 51 | Eduardo Iturrizaga Bonelli | Spain | Grandmaster |
| 52 | Jules Moussard | France | Grandmaster |
| 53 | Lu Shanglei | China | Grandmaster |
| 54 | Alexander Motylev | Romania | Grandmaster |
| 55 | Maxim Matlakov | FIDE | Grandmaster |
| 56 | Xiangzhi Bu | China | Grandmaster |
| 57 | Bassem Amin | Egypt | Grandmaster |
| 58 | Pranav Venkatesh | India | Grandmaster |
| 59 | Aravindh Chithambaram | India | Grandmaster |
| 60 | Cristobal Henriquez Villagra | Chile | Grandmaster |
| 61 | Arkadij Naiditsch | Bulgaria | Grandmaster |
| 62 | Surya Shekhar Ganguly | India | Grandmaster |
| 63 | Daniel Dardha | Belgium | Grandmaster |
| 64 | S.L. Narayanan | India | Grandmaster |
| 65 | Varuzhan Akobian | United States | Grandmaster |
| 66 | Alan Pichot | Spain | Grandmaster |
| 67 | Alexander Donchenko | Germany | Grandmaster |
| 68 | Denis Lazavik | FIDE | Grandmaster |
| 69 | Nikolas Theodorou | Greece | Grandmaster |
| 70 | Bai Jinshi | China | Grandmaster |
| 71 | Bojan Maksimovic | Bosnia and Herzegovina | Grandmaster |
| 72 | Aleksandar Indjic | Serbia | Grandmaster |
| 73 | David Paravyan | FIDE | Grandmaster |
| 74 | Jonas Buhl Bjerre | Denmark | Grandmaster |
| 75 | M. Amin Tabatabaei | Iran | Grandmaster |
| 76 | Pouya Idani | Iran | Grandmaster |
| 77 | Nijat Abasov | Azerbaijan | Grandmaster |
| 78 | Giga Quparadze | Georgia | Grandmaster |
| 79 | Andrew Hong | United States | Grandmaster |
| 80 | Aleksandr Shimanov | FIDE | Grandmaster |
| 81 | Mustafa Yilmaz | Turkey | Grandmaster |
| 82 | José Carlos Ibarra Jeréz | Spain | Grandmaster |
| 83 | Sandipan Chanda | India | Grandmaster |
| 84 | Andrei Volokitin | Ukraine | Grandmaster |
| 85 | Denis Kadric | Montenegro | Grandmaster |
| 86 | Ngoc Truong Son Nguyen | Vietnam | Grandmaster |
| 87 | Nodirbek Yakubboev | Uzbekistan | Grandmaster |
| 88 | Krishnan Sasikiran | India | Grandmaster |
| 89 | Aram Hakobyan | Armenia | Grandmaster |
| 90 | Mahammad Muradli | Azerbaijan | Grandmaster |
| 91 | Kazybek Nogerbek | Kazakhstan | Grandmaster |
| 92 | Nikita Petrov | Montenegro | Grandmaster |
| 93 | Rinat Jumabayev | Kazakhstan | Grandmaster |
| 94 | Abhimanyu Puranik | India | Grandmaster |
| 95 | Arseniy Nesterov | FIDE | Grandmaster |
| 96 | Ivan Zemlyanskii | FIDE | Grandmaster |
| 97 | Augustin Droin | France | International Master |
| 98 | David Gavrilescu | Romania | Grandmaster |
| 99 | Max Warmerdam | Netherlands | Grandmaster |
| 100 | Aydin Suleymanli | Azerbaijan | Grandmaster |
| 101 | Andrey Gorovets | FIDE | Grandmaster |
| 102 | Emre Can | Turkey | Grandmaster |
| 103 | Rudik Makarian | FIDE | Grandmaster |
| 104 | Denis Makhnev | Kazakhstan | Grandmaster |
| 105 | Aleksandr Rakhmanov | FIDE | Grandmaster |
| 106 | Robert Hovhannisyan | Armenia | Grandmaster |
| 107 | Aleksey Grebnev | FIDE | Grandmaster |
| 108 | Shamsiddin Vokhidov | Uzbekistan | Grandmaster |
| 109 | Mikhail Kobalia | FIDE | Grandmaster |
| 110 | Levan Pantsulaia | Georgia | Grandmaster |
| 111 | Frode Olav Olsen Urkedal | Norway | Grandmaster |
| 112 | Pavel Ponkratov | FIDE | Grandmaster |
| 113 | Pranesh M | India | Grandmaster |
| 114 | Brandon Jacobson | United States | Grandmaster |
| 115 | Jakub Kosakowski | Poland | Grandmaster |
| 116 | Vahap Sanal | Turkey | Grandmaster |
| 117 | Jingyao Tin | Singapore | Grandmaster |
| 118 | B. Adhiban | India | Grandmaster |
| 119 | Ediz Gurel | Turkey | Grandmaster |
| 120 | Dimitris Alexakis | Greece | Grandmaster |
| 121 | Arystan Isanzhulov | Kazakhstan | International Master |
| 122 | Tuan Minh Le | Vietnam | Grandmaster |
| 123 | Leon Luke Mendonca | India | Grandmaster |
| 124 | Bardiya Daneshvar | Iran | Grandmaster |
| 125 | Niaz Murshed | Bangladesh | Grandmaster |
| 126 | Jakhongir Vakhidov | Uzbekistan | Grandmaster |
| 127 | Zhong Zhang | China | Grandmaster |
| 128 | Marco Materia | France | International Master |
| 129 | Stelios Halkias | Greece | Grandmaster |
| 130 | Sergey Drygalov | FIDE | Grandmaster |
| 131 | Nicola Altini | Italy | International Master |
| 132 | Faustino Oro | Argentina | International Master |
| 133 | Savva Vetokhin | FIDE | Grandmaster |
| 134 | Gleb Dudin | Hungary | Grandmaster |
| 135 | Guha Mitrabha | India | Grandmaster |
| 136 | Elham Amar | Norway | Grandmaster |
| 137 | Lorenzo Lodici | Italy | Grandmaster |
| 138 | Shawn Rodrigue-Lemieux | Canada | Grandmaster |
| 139 | Konstantin Peyrer | Austria | International Master |
| 140 | Bharath Subramaniyam H | India | Grandmaster |
| 141 | Johan-Sebastian Christiansen | Norway | Grandmaster |
| 142 | Mukhiddin Madaminov | Uzbekistan | Grandmaster |
| 143 | Artem Uskov | FIDE | Grandmaster |
| 144 | Maksim Tsaruk | FIDE | Grandmaster |
| 145 | Karthik Venkataraman | India | Grandmaster |
| 146 | Sumiya Bilguun | Mongolia | Grandmaster |
| 147 | Sergei Lobanov | FIDE | Grandmaster |
| 148 | Vignir Vatnar Stefansson | Iceland | Grandmaster |
| 149 | Mahdi Gholami Orimi | Iran | Grandmaster |
| 150 | Nderim Saraci | Kosovo | International Master |
| 151 | Tong(QD) Xiao | China | Grandmaster |
| 152 | P. Iniyan | India | Grandmaster |
| 153 | Pablo Salinas Herrera | Chile | Grandmaster |
| 154 | Thomas Roussel-Roozmon | Canada | Grandmaster |
| 155 | Yagiz Kaan Erdogmus | Turkey | Grandmaster |
| 156 | Ihor Samunenkov | Ukraine | Grandmaster |
| 157 | Aditya Mittal | India | Grandmaster |
| 158 | Zhandos Agmanov | Kazakhstan | International Master |
| 159 | Cem Kaan Gokerkan | Turkey | Grandmaster |
| 160 | Sankalp Gupta | India | Grandmaster |
| 161 | Alisher Suleymenov | Kazakhstan | Grandmaster |
| 162 | Artur Davtyan | Armenia | International Master |
| 163 | Raja Rithvik R | India | Grandmaster |
| 164 | Kirill Klukin | Serbia | International Master |
| 165 | Sion Radamantys Galaviz Medina | Mexico | International Master |
| 166 | Erdem Khubukshanov | FIDE | International Master |
| 167 | Havard Haug | Norway | FIDE Master |
| 168 | Mamikon Gharibyan | Armenia | Grandmaster |
| 169 | Jagadeesh Siddharth | Singapore | Grandmaster |
| 170 | Mukhammadzokhid Suyarov | Uzbekistan | International Master |
| 171 | Mihail Nikitenko | FIDE | Grandmaster |
| 172 | Eldiyar Orozbaev | Kyrgyzstan | International Master |
| 173 | Sina Movahed | Iran | Grandmaster |
| 174 | Fy Antenaina Rakotomaharo | Madagascar | International Master |
| 175 | Raja Harshit | India | Grandmaster |
| 176 | Aldiyar Ansat | Kazakhstan | International Master |
| 177 | Lev Zverev | FIDE | International Master |
| 178 | Praveen Balakrishnan | United States | Grandmaster |
| 179 | Artiom Stribuk | FIDE | International Master |
| 180 | Goutham Krishna H | India | International Master |
| 181 | Roman Shogdzhiev | FIDE | International Master |
| 182 | Adelard Bai | Chinese Taipei | International Master |
| 183 | Emin Ohanyan | Armenia | Grandmaster |
| 184 | Christos Krallis | Greece | International Master |
| 185 | Robert Piliposyan | Armenia | International Master |
| 186 | Florian Grafl, Dr. | Germany | International Master |
| 187 | James Morris | Australia | International Master |
| 188 | Ergali Suleimen | Kazakhstan | FIDE Master |
| 189 | Nikolay Averin | FIDE | FIDE Master |
| 190 | Gabriel Gaehwiler | Switzerland | International Master |
| 191 | Hamed Wafa | Egypt | International Master |
| 192 | Thanh Tu Tran | Japan | International Master |
| 193 | Mohamed Ezat | Egypt | International Master |
| 194 | Meng Yihan | China | International Master |
| 195 | Sauat Nurgaliyev | Kazakhstan | International Master |
| 196 | Daniyal Sapenov | Kazakhstan | International Master |
| 197 | Mohamed Tissir | Morocco | International Master |
| 198 | Lucas Aguiar Cunha | Brazil | FIDE Master |
| 199 | Dau Khuong Duy | Vietnam | International Master |
| 200 | Armin Musovic | Montenegro | FIDE Master |
| 201 | Edgar Mamedov | Kazakhstan | Grandmaster |
| 202 | Harikrishnan A | India | Grandmaster |
| 203 | Rao Sharan | India | International Master |
| 204 | Vitus Bondo Medhus | Denmark | FIDE Master |
| 205 | Mark Smirnov | Kazakhstan | FIDE Master |
| 206 | Abilmansur Abdilkhair | Kazakhstan | International Master |
| 207 | Fred Berend | Luxembourg | International Master |
| 208 | Sedrani Ammar | United Arab Emirates | FIDE Master |
| 209 | Victor Muntean | Sweden | No title |
| 210 | Danis Kuandykuly | Kazakhstan | FIDE Master |
| 211 | Harshavardhan G B | India | International Master |
| 212 | Sergey Sklokin | FIDE | FIDE Master |
| 213 | Miras Assylov | Kazakhstan | FIDE Master |
| 214 | Aram Chekh Adm Khedr | Syria | FIDE Master |
| 215 | Omran Al Hosani | United Arab Emirates | International Master |
| 216 | Tarik Anwoir | Morocco | No title |
| 217 | Ala Eddine Boulrens | Algeria | No title |
| 218 | Omer Salah Fates | Libya | No title |
| 219 | Yousef A. Alhassadi | Libya | FIDE Master |
| 220 | Aashish Phuyal | Nepal | No title |
| 221 | Yassine Sentissi | Morocco | Candidate Master |
| 222 | Jonathan Bodemar | Thailand | Candidate Master |
| 223 | James Dinham | South Africa | No title |
| 224 | Mohammed Damaj | Palestine | Candidate Master |
| 225 | Rami Taher | Libya | No title |
| 226 | Salim Aliyan Al Mashikhi | Oman | FIDE Master |
| 227 | Sushrut Dahal | Nepal | Candidate Master |
| 228 | Ryan Blackwood | Cayman Islands | No title |
| 229 | Ashwath Kaushik | Singapore | FIDE Master |
| 230 | Emad Khayat | Saudi Arabia | No title |
| 231 | Talab Rami | Syria | No title |

== Format ==
There were 13 rounds according to the Swiss system. Time controls were as follows:

- 15 minutes set as default time on the clock for each player.
- 10 seconds added on the clock of each player each time the clock is pressed starting from the first move, except for the case of making a claim.
- Additional time can be given as compensation of opponent either violated any rule or made an invalid claim. The time added, if any, shall be decided by the arbiter.

Players are given points according to their performance in the tournament. Points are awarded as follows:

- 1 Point awarded for each victory
- 0.5 Point awarded for each draw scored
- No point awarded for a loss

At the end, the players are ranked according to the total points they scored in the tournament in descending order.

When 2 or more players are tied for the same rank but not rank 1, the tie should be broken without any tie-breaker by Buchholz System. If there is still a tie, their average FIDE rating for Rapid games shall be taken into account, the player with higher rating shall receive a higher rank. If there is still a tie, the players shall, via a direct encounter in tie-breaker, end the tie. If even that game ends in a draw, drawing of lots shall remain the final solution to break the tie.

When 2 are tied for the first place, no method mentioned above shall be used. In such a case, a Blitz chess match shall be played with time control 3 minutes default clock time + Increment of 2 seconds per move to determine the winner. If it ends in a draw, one sudden death game shall determine the winner.

When more than 2 are tied for the first place, no method mentioned above shall be used. In such a case, a single elimination knockout tournament shall be played between all the players tied for the first position, which means each player has to play any other and the person who loses the game will be eliminated. For example, if 4 players are tied, there are 2 games played between 2 players, the losers of each game shall be eliminated and the winners of each game shall play another knockout. The process shall continue until all but 1 player is left, and the player is awarded rank 1. All other players are awarded rank as per the criteria mentioned above for 2 or more players tied for the same rank but not rank 1.

Finally, the person who scored rank 1 is given the title World Rapid Chess Champion.

== Results ==
The following table lists all participants, with the results from the 13 rounds. They are ranked according to the results, taking into account the tie-breaks.

Notation: "1 (W 135)" indicates a game against the player of rank 135 (Lorenzo Lodici) with W white pieces that resulted in a win (1 point).

| Rk. | Name | Elo | 1 | 2 | 3 | 4 | 5 | 6 | 7 | 8 | 9 | 10 | 11 | 12 | 13 | Pts. | BC1 | BS | AROC1 |
|---|---|---|---|---|---|---|---|---|---|---|---|---|---|---|---|---|---|---|---|
| 1 | (Norway) Magnus Carlsen | 2824 | 1 (W 135) | 1 (B 116) | 1 (W 66) | 1 (B 111) | ½ (W 3) | ½ (B 6) | 0 (B 2) | 1 (W 38) | 1 (B 56) | 1 (W 34) | 1 (W 4) | 1 (B 15) | ½ (W 9) | 10.5 | 99 | 105.5 | 2639 |
| 2 | (FIDE) Vladislav Artemiev | 2727 | 1 (W 184) | 1 (B 72) | 1 (W 45) | ½ (B 38) | 1 (W 35) | 1 (B 3) | 1 (W 1) | ½ (B 6) | ½ (W 34) | ½ (B 4) | ½ (W 5) | ½ (W 7) | ½ (B 8) | 9.5 | 105.5 | 111 | 2666 |
| 3 | (India) Arjun Erigaisi | 2714 | 1 (W 120) | 1 (B 44) | 1 (W 68) | 1 (B 80) | ½ (B 1) | 0 (W 2) | ½ (B 112) | 1 (W 95) | ½ (B 33) | 1 (W 11) | 0 (B 15) | 1 (W 35) | 1 (W 14) | 9.5 | 98 | 104.5 | 2608 |
| 4 | (United States) Hans Niemann | 2612 | 1 (B 159) | ½ (W 42) | 1 (B 128) | ½ (W 21) | 1 (B 120) | 1 (W 110) | ½ (B 56) | 1 (W 58) | 1 (B 14) | ½ (W 2) | 0 (B 1) | 1 (W 13) | ½ (B 6) | 9.5 | 97.5 | 103.5 | 2593 |
| 5 | (United States) Leinier Domínguez | 2703 | ½ (W 61) | ½ (B 77) | 1 (W 214) | 1 (B 54) | ½ (W 45) | ½ (B 16) | ½ (W 113) | 1 (B 44) | 1 (W 66) | 1 (W 35) | ½ (B 2) | ½ (B 14) | 1 (W 15) | 9.5 | 95.5 | 100 | 2562 |
| 6 | (France) Maxime Vachier-Lagrave | 2730 | 1 (B 199) | 1 (W 78) | ½ (B 82) | 1 (W 33) | 1 (B 27) | ½ (W 1) | ½ (B 111) | ½ (W 2) | ½ (B 35) | ½ (W 20) | 1 (B 39) | ½ (W 8) | ½ (W 4) | 9 | 100 | 105.5 | 2655 |
| 7 | (Uzbekistan) Javokhir Sindarov | 2704 | 1 (B 127) | 1 (W 166) | ½ (B 81) | 1 (W 63) | ½ (W 38) | ½ (B 59) | 0 (B 33) | 1 (W 82) | 1 (W 111) | ½ (B 14) | 1 (W 24) | ½ (B 2) | ½ (W 10) | 9 | 93.5 | 99.5 | 2603 |
| 8 | (United States) Wesley So | 2702 | 0 (W 37) | 1 (B 208) | 1 (W 77) | 1 (B 93) | ½ (W 17) | ½ (B 114) | 1 (W 165) | ½ (B 59) | 1 (W 16) | ½ (B 33) | 1 (W 56) | ½ (B 6) | ½ (W 2) | 9 | 93 | 98 | 2592 |
| 9 | (Netherlands) Anish Giri | 2685 | 1 (B 181) | ½ (W 57) | 1 (B 156) | 1 (W 31) | ½ (B 110) | ½ (W 20) | 0 (B 14) | ½ (W 113) | 1 (B 151) | 1 (W 60) | ½ (B 17) | 1 (W 33) | ½ (B 1) | 9 | 92.5 | 98 | 2575 |
| 10 | (FIDE) Andrey Esipenko | 2649 | 1 (B 185) | ½ (W 156) | ½ (B 57) | 1 (W 134) | ½ (B 14) | 0 (W 60) | ½ (B 25) | 1 (W 128) | 1 (B 70) | ½ (W 18) | 1 (B 76) | 1 (W 20) | ½ (B 7) | 9 | 91.5 | 97 | 2563 |
| 11 | (United States) Samuel Sevian | 2658 | 1 (W 148) | 0 (B 80) | 1 (W 123) | ½ (B 115) | 1 (W 55) | ½ (B 174) | 1 (W 70) | ½ (B 60) | 1 (W 68) | 0 (B 3) | 1 (W 41) | ½ (B 23) | 1 (W 40) | 9 | 90.5 | 96 | 2571 |
| 12 | (FIDE) Daniil Dubov | 2686 | 1 (W 105) | 0 (B 64) | ½ (W 178) | 1 (B 41) | 1 (W 125) | ½ (B 45) | 1 (W 88) | ½ (B 16) | ½ (W 59) | 1 (B 84) | 0 (W 14) | 1 (B 80) | 1 (W 36) | 9 | 90.5 | 96 | 2552 |
| 13 | (Azerbaijan) Shakhriyar Mamedyarov | 2707 | ½ (W 77) | ½ (B 96) | 0 (W 171) | 1 (B 183) | ½ (W 61) | 1 (B 98) | 1 (W 64) | 1 (W 110) | 1 (B 58) | ½ (B 24) | 1 (W 23) | 0 (B 4) | 1 (W 34) | 9 | 90 | 95.5 | 2558 |
| 14 | (FIDE) Aleksandr Shimanov | 2554 | ½ (W 182) | 1 (B 202) | ½ (W 224) | 1 (B 175) | ½ (W 10) | 1 (B 26) | 1 (W 9) | 1 (B 18) | 0 (W 4) | ½ (W 7) | 1 (B 12) | ½ (W 5) | 0 (B 3) | 8.5 | 98.5 | 103.5 | 2634 |
| 15 | (Turkey) Yağız Kaan Erdoğmuş | 2446 | 0 (B 52) | 1 (W 243) | ½ (B 87) | 1 (W 190) | 1 (B 63) | 1 (W 22) | ½ (B 38) | 1 (W 86) | 1 (W 19) | ½ (B 23) | 1 (W 3) | 0 (W 1) | 0 (B 5) | 8.5 | 98 | 101 | 2660 |
| 16 | (India) Aravindh Chithambaram | 2590 | 1 (B 108) | 0 (W 110) | 1 (B 185) | 1 (W 126) | ½ (B 18) | ½ (W 5) | 1 (B 100) | ½ (W 12) | 0 (B 8) | 1 (W 65) | 1 (B 21) | ½ (W 27) | ½ (B 28) | 8.5 | 96 | 101.5 | 2566 |
| 17 | (FIDE) Denis Lazavik | 2576 | 1 (B 216) | ½ (W 91) | ½ (B 18) | 1 (W 117) | ½ (B 8) | 1 (W 144) | ½ (B 39) | ½ (W 28) | 1 (W 26) | ½ (B 40) | ½ (W 9) | ½ (B 19) | ½ (W 23) | 8.5 | 96 | 100.5 | 2646 |
| 18 | (United States) Fabiano Caruana | 2751 | ½ (W 96) | 1 (B 41) | ½ (W 17) | 1 (B 64) | ½ (W 16) | ½ (B 47) | 1 (W 116) | 0 (W 14) | 1 (B 113) | ½ (B 10) | 1 (W 68) | ½ (B 34) | ½ (W 22) | 8.5 | 95.5 | 102 | 2579 |
| 19 | (India) Nihal Sarin | 2664 | 1 (B 157) | 1 (W 88) | 0 (B 76) | 1 (W 32) | 1 (B 78) | ½ (W 38) | 1 (B 57) | ½ (W 33) | 0 (B 15) | ½ (W 25) | 1 (B 67) | ½ (W 17) | ½ (B 31) | 8.5 | 94.5 | 100.5 | 2532 |
| 20 | (India) Gukesh Dommaraju | 2692 | ½ (B 130) | 1 (W 168) | 1 (B 113) | 1 (W 82) | 1 (W 76) | ½ (B 9) | ½ (W 34) | 1 (B 111) | 0 (W 23) | ½ (B 6) | ½ (W 33) | 0 (B 10) | 1 (W 64) | 8.5 | 92.5 | 98.5 | 2606 |
| 21 | (China) Meng Yihan | 2355 | 1 (W 137) | 1 (B 187) | ½ (W 35) | ½ (B 4) | ½ (W 47) | ½ (W 29) | 0 (B 40) | 1 (B 165) | 1 (W 158) | ½ (B 30) | 0 (W 16) | 1 (B 72) | 1 (W 71) | 8.5 | 92.5 | 98 | 2619 |
| 22 | (China) Lu Shanglei | 2616 | ½ (W 79) | 1 (B 149) | ½ (W 37) | ½ (B 96) | 1 (W 43) | 0 (B 15) | ½ (W 94) | 1 (B 180) | ½ (W 41) | 1 (B 42) | ½ (W 36) | 1 (B 46) | ½ (B 18) | 8.5 | 92 | 97.5 | 2490 |
| 23 | (Uzbekistan) Nodirbek Abdusattorov | 2717 | ½ (B 141) | 1 (W 222) | 0 (B 31) | 1 (W 168) | 1 (B 102) | ½ (W 85) | 1 (B 78) | 1 (W 112) | 1 (B 20) | ½ (W 15) | 0 (B 13) | ½ (W 11) | ½ (B 17) | 8.5 | 92 | 96.5 | 2581 |
| 24 | (Iran) Parham Maghsoodloo | 2669 | ½ (B 65) | ½ (W 201) | ½ (B 67) | 1 (W 130) | 1 (B 101) | 0 (W 57) | 1 (B 103) | 1 (W 89) | 1 (B 76) | ½ (W 13) | 0 (B 7) | ½ (W 29) | 1 (B 75) | 8.5 | 91 | 96 | 2544 |
| 25 | (Turkey) Ediz Gürel | 2502 | 1 (B 239) | 1 (W 85) | 0 (B 111) | ½ (W 50) | 1 (B 71) | 0 (W 58) | ½ (W 10) | 1 (B 152) | 1 (W 118) | ½ (B 19) | ½ (W 49) | ½ (B 51) | 1 (W 59) | 8.5 | 90 | 93.5 | 2629 |
| 26 | (FIDE) Dmitry Andreikin | 2671 | W- (42) | 1 (W 143) | 1 (B 69) | ½ (W 101) | 1 (B 156) | 0 (W 14) | 1 (B 54) | 1 (W 81) | 0 (B 17) | 1 (W 82) | ½ (B 34) | ½ (B 43) | 1 (W 73) | 8.5 | 89.5 | 97.5 | 2527 |
| 27 | (FIDE) Alexander Grischuk | 2677 | 1 (B 176) | 1 (W 131) | 1 (B 89) | ½ (W 110) | 0 (W 6) | ½ (B 82) | ½ (W 36) | ½ (B 57) | 1 (W 104) | ½ (B 79) | 1 (W 78) | ½ (B 16) | ½ (B 32) | 8.5 | 89.5 | 95 | 2547 |
| 28 | (India) R Praggnanandhaa | 2663 | 1 (W 178) | ½ (B 93) | ½ (W 115) | 1 (B 162) | 0 (W 44) | 1 (B 134) | 1 (W 174) | ½ (B 17) | ½ (W 60) | ½ (B 36) | 1 (W 55) | ½ (B 40) | ½ (W 16) | 8.5 | 88.5 | 94 | 2555 |
| 29 | (Romania) Alexander Motylev | 2603 | 1 (W 147) | ½ (B 43) | 1 (W 62) | 0 (B 172) | 1 (W 98) | ½ (B 21) | ½ (W 37) | 0 (B 36) | ½ (W 171) | 1 (B 151) | 1 (W 115) | ½ (B 24) | 1 (W 60) | 8.5 | 87 | 92.5 | 2491 |
| 30 | (France) Alireza Firouzja | 2754 | ½ (B 222) | 1 (W 141) | ½ (B 95) | ½ (W 102) | ½ (B 113) | 1 (W 32) | 0 (B 76) | 1 (W 88) | ½ (B 78) | ½ (W 21) | ½ (B 81) | 1 (W 57) | 1 (B 68) | 8.5 | 87 | 91.5 | 2525 |
| 31 | (Denmark) Jonas Buhl Bjerre | 2570 | 1 (W 213) | ½ (B 83) | 1 (W 23) | 0 (B 9) | ½ (W 173) | 1 (B 211) | 0 (W 86) | ½ (B 119) | ½ (W 46) | 1 (B 180) | 1 (W 37) | 1 (B 56) | ½ (W 19) | 8.5 | 85.5 | 90 | 2523 |
| 32 | (Slovakia) Samir Sahidi | 2524 | 1 (W 238) | 0 (B 90) | 1 (W 195) | 0 (B 19) | 1 (W 119) | 0 (B 30) | 0 (W 46) | 1 (B 202) | 1 (W 164) | 1 (B 145) | 1 (W 84) | 1 (B 49) | ½ (W 27) | 8.5 | 85.5 | 89 | 2535 |
| 33 | (Chile) Cristobal Henriquez Villagra | 2586 | 1 (W 169) | ½ (B 62) | 1 (W 83) | 0 (B 6) | 1 (W 171) | 1 (B 145) | 1 (W 7) | ½ (B 19) | ½ (W 3) | ½ (W 8) | ½ (B 20) | 0 (B 9) | ½ (W 41) | 8 | 97.5 | 103 | 2612 |
| 34 | (Serbia) Alexey Sarana | 2641 | 1 (B 153) | ½ (W 151) | ½ (B 134) | 1 (W 89) | 1 (B 88) | 1 (W 81) | ½ (B 20) | 1 (W 76) | ½ (B 2) | 0 (B 1) | ½ (W 26) | ½ (W 18) | 0 (B 13) | 8 | 95 | 101 | 2616 |
| 35 | (Azerbaijan) Rauf Mamedov | 2610 | 1 (B 173) | 1 (W 160) | ½ (B 21) | 1 (W 60) | 0 (B 2) | 1 (W 200) | 1 (B 65) | ½ (W 56) | ½ (W 6) | 0 (B 5) | 1 (W 94) | 0 (B 3) | ½ (W 43) | 8 | 95 | 100 | 2560 |
| 36 | (FIDE) Rudik Makarian | 2524 | 1 (B 227) | 1 (W 52) | ½ (B 56) | ½ (W 97) | 1 (B 86) | 0 (W 111) | ½ (B 27) | 1 (W 29) | ½ (B 39) | ½ (W 28) | ½ (B 22) | 1 (W 90) | 0 (B 12) | 8 | 94.5 | 98.5 | 2648 |
| 37 | (Norway) Elham Amar | 2482 | 1 (B 8) | ½ (W 114) | ½ (B 22) | ½ (W 112) | ½ (B 92) | 1 (W 49) | ½ (B 29) | ½ (W 85) | ½ (B 38) | ½ (W 63) | 0 (B 31) | 1 (W 95) | 1 (B 78) | 8 | 92.5 | 99 | 2604 |
| 38 | (Armenia) Shant Sargsyan | 2611 | 1 (W 200) | 1 (B 247) | 1 (W 175) | ½ (W 2) | ½ (B 7) | ½ (B 19) | ½ (W 15) | 0 (B 1) | ½ (W 37) | 0 (B 41) | 1 (W 174) | ½ (B 81) | 1 (W 88) | 8 | 92.5 | 97.5 | 2569 |
| 39 | (China) Yu Yangyi | 2680 | 1 (W 171) | 1 (B 73) | 1 (W 64) | ½ (B 76) | ½ (W 172) | ½ (B 44) | ½ (W 17) | ½ (B 68) | ½ (W 36) | 1 (B 59) | 0 (W 6) | ½ (B 53) | ½ (W 55) | 8 | 92 | 97.5 | 2550 |
| 40 | (FIDE) Ian Nepomniachtchi | 2762 | 1 (B 98) | 1 (W 75) | ½ (B 63) | ½ (W 114) | ½ (B 85) | 0 (W 112) | 1 (W 21) | ½ (B 104) | 1 (B 95) | ½ (W 17) | 1 (B 57) | ½ (W 28) | 0 (B 11) | 8 | 91.5 | 98 | 2585 |
| 41 | (India) Leon Luke Mendonca | 2498 | ½ (B 48) | 0 (W 18) | 1 (B 186) | 0 (W 12) | ½ (B 124) | 1 (W 194) | 1 (B 216) | 1 (W 97) | ½ (B 22) | 1 (W 38) | 0 (B 11) | 1 (W 114) | ½ (B 33) | 8 | 90 | 94.5 | 2586 |
| 42 | (India) Karthik Venkataraman | 2467 | B+ (26) | ½ (B 4) | ½ (W 177) | 0 (B 66) | 1 (W 118) | 1 (W 92) | ½ (B 85) | ½ (W 114) | ½ (B 112) | 0 (W 22) | 1 (B 82) | 1 (W 74) | ½ (B 56) | 8 | 89 | 94.5 | 2606 |
| 43 | (Turkey) Vahap Şanal | 2504 | 1 (B 245) | ½ (W 29) | ½ (B 146) | ½ (W 58) | 0 (B 22) | 0 (B 224) | 1 (W 133) | 1 (W 117) | 1 (B 52) | 1 (W 71) | ½ (B 90) | ½ (W 26) | ½ (B 35) | 8 | 89 | 91.5 | 2599 |
| 44 | (India) Sandipan Chanda | 2553 | 1 (B 163) | 0 (W 3) | 1 (B 201) | 1 (W 48) | 1 (B 28) | ½ (W 39) | 0 (B 58) | 0 (W 5) | ½ (B 149) | 0 (W 62) | 1 (B 200) | 1 (W 150) | 1 (B 79) | 8 | 88.5 | 93.5 | 2554 |
| 45 | (Iran) Amin Tabatabaei | 2579 | 1 (B 124) | 1 (W 212) | 0 (B 2) | 1 (W 154) | ½ (B 5) | ½ (W 12) | 0 (B 110) | 1 (W 100) | ½ (B 144) | 0 (W 76) | 1 (B 149) | 1 (W 67) | ½ (B 48) | 8 | 88.5 | 93 | 2543 |
| 46 | (Azerbaijan) Murad Ibrahimli | 2411 | ½ (B 49) | 0 (W 112) | 0 (B 107) | 1 (W 229) | 1 (B 140) | ½ (W 101) | 1 (B 32) | ½ (W 74) | ½ (B 31) | 1 (W 113) | 1 (B 92) | 0 (W 22) | 1 (B 85) | 8 | 88.5 | 92.5 | 2575 |
| 47 | (Hungary) Ádám Kozák | 2593 | ½ (B 69) | 1 (W 186) | 1 (B 91) | ½ (W 56) | ½ (B 21) | ½ (W 18) | ½ (B 89) | ½ (W 83) | ½ (B 65) | 0 (W 67) | 1 (B 181) | ½ (W 76) | 1 (B 77) | 8 | 87.5 | 93 | 2471 |
| 48 | (United States) Levon Aronian | 2756 | ½ (W 41) | 1 (B 195) | ½ (W 74) | 0 (B 44) | 1 (W 77) | 0 (B 88) | 0 (W 61) | 1 (W 150) | 1 (B 120) | 1 (B 93) | 1 (W 79) | ½ (B 59) | ½ (W 45) | 8 | 87 | 92.5 | 2514 |
| 49 | (France) Jules Moussard | 2609 | ½ (W 46) | ½ (B 79) | 1 (W 211) | 0 (B 120) | 1 (W 148) | 0 (B 37) | 1 (W 132) | 1 (B 172) | ½ (B 67) | 1 (W 54) | ½ (B 25) | 0 (W 32) | 1 (W 81) | 8 | 87 | 91.5 | 2478 |
| 50 | (Germany) Vincent Keymer | 2640 | 1 (W 122) | ½ (B 103) | ½ (W 162) | ½ (B 25) | 0 (W 174) | ½ (B 61) | ½ (W 77) | ½ (B 105) | 1 (W 176) | 0 (B 53) | 1 (W 148) | 1 (B 115) | 1 (W 102) | 8 | 83 | 88.5 | 2502 |
| 51 | (Armenia) Haik M. Martirosyan | 2635 | ½ (B 201) | ½ (W 65) | ½ (B 176) | ½ (W 153) | 1 (B 157) | 0 (W 89) | 1 (W 160) | ½ (B 61) | ½ (W 77) | 1 (B 162) | 1 (B 102) | ½ (W 25) | ½ (W 53) | 8 | 82.5 | 87.5 | 2488 |
| 52 | (FIDE) Volodar Murzin | 2642 | 1 (W 15) | 0 (B 36) | 0 (W 148) | 0 (B 121) | 1 (W 167) | ½ (B 147) | 1 (W 178) | 1 (B 184) | 0 (W 43) | ½ (B 123) | 1 (W 132) | 1 (W 93) | 1 (B 80) | 8 | 81.5 | 87 | 2475 |
| 53 | (FIDE) Aleksey Grebnev | 2529 | 1 (B 220) | 0 (W 56) | 0 (B 173) | ½ (W 204) | 1 (B 139) | ½ (W 161) | ½ (B 159) | 1 (W 154) | ½ (B 62) | 1 (W 50) | 1 (B 86) | ½ (W 39) | ½ (B 51) | 8 | 81 | 85.5 | 2509 |
| 54 | (Kazakhstan) Rinat Jumabayev | 2543 | 1 (B 205) | 0 (W 144) | 1 (B 161) | 0 (W 5) | ½ (B 154) | 1 (W 179) | 0 (W 26) | 1 (B 214) | 1 (W 147) | 0 (B 49) | ½ (B 146) | 1 (W 110) | 1 (B 76) | 8 | 80 | 84.5 | 2516 |
| 55 | (Kazakhstan) Kazybek Nogerbek | 2538 | 0 (B 212) | 1 (W 203) | 1 (B 159) | ½ (W 144) | 0 (B 11) | ½ (W 154) | ½ (B 117) | 1 (W 201) | 1 (B 179) | 1 (W 146) | 0 (B 28) | 1 (W 87) | ½ (B 39) | 8 | 78.5 | 83 | 2533 |
| 56 | (United States) Ray Robson | 2652 | 1 (W 132) | 1 (B 53) | ½ (W 36) | ½ (B 47) | 1 (W 80) | 1 (B 172) | ½ (W 4) | ½ (B 35) | 0 (W 1) | 1 (B 83) | 0 (B 8) | 0 (W 31) | ½ (W 42) | 7.5 | 98 | 103.5 | 2569 |
| 57 | (FIDE) Ivan Zemlyanskii | 2539 | 1 (W 207) | ½ (B 9) | ½ (W 10) | 1 (B 224) | ½ (W 152) | 1 (B 24) | 0 (W 19) | ½ (W 27) | ½ (B 86) | 1 (B 66) | 0 (W 40) | 0 (B 30) | 1 (W 121) | 7.5 | 93 | 98 | 2656 |
| 58 | (Vietnam) Lê Quang Liêm | 2646 | ½ (W 123) | 1 (B 61) | ½ (W 93) | ½ (B 43) | 1 (W 103) | 1 (B 25) | 1 (W 44) | 0 (B 4) | 0 (W 13) | 0 (B 78) | 1 (W 125) | 0 (B 73) | 1 (W 83) | 7.5 | 92.5 | 99 | 2545 |
| 59 | (FIDE) Maxim Matlakov | 2602 | 0 (B 76) | 1 (W 188) | 1 (B 100) | 1 (W 157) | 1 (B 150) | ½ (W 7) | ½ (B 60) | ½ (W 8) | ½ (B 12) | 0 (W 39) | 1 (B 70) | ½ (W 48) | 0 (B 25) | 7.5 | 92.5 | 98 | 2564 |
| 60 | (Poland) Jakub Kosakowski | 2506 | 1 (W 191) | ½ (B 84) | 1 (W 118) | 0 (B 35) | 1 (W 246) | 1 (B 10) | ½ (W 59) | ½ (W 11) | ½ (B 28) | 0 (B 9) | ½ (W 114) | 1 (W 112) | 0 (B 29) | 7.5 | 92 | 97.5 | 2631 |
| 61 | (FIDE) Savva Vetokhin | 2486 | ½ (B 5) | 0 (W 58) | 1 (B 196) | ½ (W 87) | ½ (B 13) | ½ (W 50) | 1 (B 48) | ½ (W 51) | 0 (B 146) | 1 (W 124) | ½ (B 85) | ½ (W 111) | 1 (B 112) | 7.5 | 89.5 | 95 | 2628 |
| 62 | (India) Harshit Raja | 2396 | 1 (B 92) | ½ (W 33) | 0 (B 29) | 0 (W 75) | 1 (B 190) | 1 (W 156) | ½ (B 71) | ½ (W 63) | ½ (W 53) | 1 (B 44) | ½ (W 64) | 0 (B 68) | 1 (W 116) | 7.5 | 89.5 | 95 | 2573 |
| 63 | (Greece) Nikolas Theodorou | 2581 | 1 (B 194) | 1 (W 129) | ½ (W 40) | 0 (B 7) | 0 (W 15) | 1 (B 178) | ½ (W 145) | ½ (B 62) | 1 (W 99) | ½ (B 37) | ½ (W 83) | ½ (B 79) | ½ (W 69) | 7.5 | 88 | 93.5 | 2490 |
| 64 | (Montenegro) Denis Kadric | 2552 | 1 (B 226) | 1 (W 12) | 0 (B 39) | 0 (W 18) | ½ (B 126) | 1 (W 201) | 0 (B 13) | 1 (W 155) | 1 (B 173) | ½ (W 87) | ½ (B 62) | 1 (W 91) | 0 (B 20) | 7.5 | 87.5 | 91.5 | 2551 |
| 65 | (Uzbekistan) Mukhiddin Madaminov | 2465 | ½ (W 24) | ½ (B 51) | 1 (W 106) | ½ (B 177) | 1 (W 158) | 1 (B 152) | 0 (W 35) | ½ (B 84) | ½ (W 47) | 0 (B 16) | ½ (W 116) | ½ (W 92) | 1 (B 136) | 7.5 | 87 | 92.5 | 2614 |
| 66 | (Spain) Eduardo Iturrizaga Bonelli | 2605 | 1 (B 143) | 1 (W 117) | 0 (B 1) | 1 (W 42) | ½ (B 200) | 0 (W 76) | 1 (B 153) | 1 (W 173) | 0 (B 5) | 0 (W 57) | 0 (B 103) | 1 (W 155) | 1 (B 127) | 7.5 | 86.5 | 91.5 | 2507 |
| 67 | (Hungary) Gleb Dudin | 2483 | 0 (W 145) | 1 (B 215) | ½ (W 24) | 1 (B 142) | ½ (W 84) | ½ (W 146) | ½ (B 97) | 1 (B 225) | ½ (W 49) | 1 (B 47) | 0 (W 19) | 0 (B 45) | 1 (B 114) | 7.5 | 86.5 | 91 | 2630 |
| 68 | (China) Bai Jinshi | 2571 | 1 (B 203) | 1 (W 240) | 0 (B 3) | ½ (W 173) | ½ (B 216) | 1 (W 155) | 1 (B 91) | ½ (W 39) | 0 (B 11) | 1 (W 144) | 0 (B 18) | 1 (W 62) | 0 (W 30) | 7.5 | 85 | 88.5 | 2534 |
| 69 | (FIDE) Lev Zverev | 2394 | ½ (W 47) | 1 (B 125) | 0 (W 26) | 0 (B 103) | W+ (247) | ½ (B 115) | 1 (W 134) | 0 (B 80) | 0 (W 162) | 1 (W 120) | 1 (B 89) | 1 (W 113) | ½ (B 63) | 7.5 | 84 | 85.5 | 2546 |
| 70 | (Singapore) Tin Jingyao | 2510 | 1 (W 218) | ½ (B 118) | ½ (W 84) | ½ (B 246) | ½ (W 177) | 1 (W 87) | 0 (B 11) | 1 (B 145) | 0 (W 10) | 1 (B 158) | 0 (W 59) | ½ (W 86) | 1 (B 111) | 7.5 | 83.5 | 88 | 2636 |
| 71 | (Austria) Kirill Alekseenko | 2611 | 1 (W 121) | ½ (B 197) | 0 (W 172) | 1 (B 178) | 0 (W 25) | 1 (B 171) | ½ (W 62) | ½ (B 94) | 1 (W 122) | 0 (B 43) | 1 (W 101) | 1 (W 103) | 0 (B 21) | 7.5 | 83 | 88.5 | 2466 |
| 72 | (Uzbekistan) Nodirbek Yakubboev | 2558 | 1 (B 221) | 0 (W 2) | 0 (B 99) | 0 (W 188) | 1 (B 226) | 1 (W 108) | ½ (B 155) | 1 (W 91) | 1 (B 89) | 0 (W 90) | 1 (B 144) | 0 (W 21) | 1 (B 117) | 7.5 | 82 | 86 | 2471 |
| 73 | (Azerbaijan) Mahammad Muradli | 2546 | 1 (B 138) | 0 (W 39) | 0 (B 154) | 1 (W 203) | ½ (B 161) | 0 (W 149) | 1 (B 193) | ½ (W 153) | 1 (B 100) | 1 (W 110) | ½ (B 87) | 1 (W 58) | 0 (B 26) | 7.5 | 80.5 | 85.5 | 2497 |
| 74 | (Germany) Alexander Donchenko | 2581 | ½ (B 186) | 1 (W 196) | ½ (B 48) | ½ (W 99) | ½ (B 155) | ½ (W 153) | ½ (W 224) | ½ (B 46) | 0 (W 94) | 1 (B 122) | 1 (W 171) | 0 (B 42) | 1 (W 130) | 7.5 | 80 | 85.5 | 2489 |
| 75 | (Georgia (country)) Giga Quparadze | 2558 | 1 (W 217) | 0 (B 40) | ½ (W 79) | 1 (B 62) | ½ (W 83) | 0 (B 173) | 0 (W 122) | ½ (B 211) | 1 (W 154) | 1 (B 183) | 1 (W 172) | 1 (B 94) | 0 (W 24) | 7.5 | 78.5 | 83 | 2465 |
| 76 | (Iran) Sina Movahed | 2405 | 1 (W 59) | 1 (B 158) | 1 (W 19) | ½ (W 39) | 0 (B 20) | 1 (B 66) | 1 (W 30) | 0 (B 34) | 0 (W 24) | 1 (B 45) | 0 (W 10) | ½ (B 47) | 0 (W 54) | 7 | 98 | 104 | 2644 |
| 77 | (Argentina) Faustino Oro | 2489 | ½ (B 13) | ½ (W 5) | 0 (B 8) | 1 (W 163) | 0 (B 48) | 1 (W 124) | ½ (B 50) | 1 (W 109) | ½ (B 51) | ½ (W 85) | ½ (B 95) | 1 (W 146) | 0 (W 47) | 7 | 93 | 99 | 2622 |
| 78 | (United States) Andrew Hong | 2556 | 1 (W 215) | 0 (B 6) | 1 (W 121) | 1 (B 119) | 0 (W 19) | 1 (B 79) | 0 (W 23) | 1 (B 175) | ½ (W 30) | 1 (W 58) | 0 (B 27) | ½ (B 83) | 0 (W 37) | 7 | 91 | 95.5 | 2548 |
| 79 | (India) Pranav Anand | 2421 | ½ (B 22) | ½ (W 49) | ½ (B 75) | ½ (W 107) | 1 (B 166) | 0 (W 78) | 1 (B 131) | 1 (W 92) | 1 (B 85) | ½ (W 27) | 0 (B 48) | ½ (W 63) | 0 (W 44) | 7 | 90.5 | 96.5 | 2599 |
| 80 | (Armenia) Aram Hakobyan | 2539 | 1 (B 233) | 1 (W 11) | 1 (B 144) | 0 (W 3) | 0 (B 56) | 0 (W 91) | 1 (B 161) | 1 (W 69) | ½ (B 90) | ½ (W 86) | 1 (B 111) | 0 (W 12) | 0 (W 52) | 7 | 90.5 | 94.5 | 2582 |
| 81 | (Armenia) Robert Hovhannisyan | 2517 | 1 (W 210) | 1 (B 152) | ½ (W 7) | ½ (W 86) | 1 (B 97) | 0 (B 34) | ½ (W 84) | 0 (B 26) | ½ (W 116) | 1 (B 118) | ½ (W 30) | ½ (W 38) | 0 (B 49) | 7 | 90 | 95 | 2646 |
| 82 | (Spain) Alan Pichot | 2577 | 1 (W 133) | 1 (B 219) | ½ (W 6) | 0 (B 20) | 1 (W 99) | ½ (W 27) | ½ (B 83) | 0 (B 7) | 1 (W 183) | 0 (B 26) | 0 (W 42) | 1 (B 171) | ½ (W 94) | 7 | 90 | 94.5 | 2532 |
| 83 | (Azerbaijan) Khagan Ahmad | 2302 | 1 (B 136) | ½ (W 31) | 0 (B 33) | 1 (W 128) | ½ (B 75) | 1 (W 131) | ½ (W 82) | ½ (B 47) | 1 (B 114) | 0 (W 56) | ½ (B 63) | ½ (W 78) | 0 (B 58) | 7 | 88 | 94.5 | 2583 |
| 84 | (Ukraine) Vasyl Ivanchuk | 2630 | 1 (B 154) | ½ (W 60) | ½ (B 70) | ½ (W 98) | ½ (B 67) | 1 (W 120) | ½ (B 81) | ½ (W 65) | 1 (B 110) | 0 (W 12) | 0 (B 32) | ½ (W 127) | ½ (B 99) | 7 | 88 | 94 | 2502 |
| 85 | (Belgium) Daniel Dardha | 2592 | 1 (W 193) | 0 (B 25) | 1 (W 180) | 1 (B 148) | ½ (W 40) | ½ (B 23) | ½ (W 42) | ½ (B 37) | 0 (W 79) | ½ (B 77) | ½ (W 61) | 1 (B 157) | 0 (W 46) | 7 | 88 | 93.5 | 2507 |
| 86 | (Netherlands) Jorden van Foreest | 2635 | 1 (W 180) | ½ (B 162) | 1 (W 197) | ½ (B 81) | 0 (W 36) | 1 (W 135) | 1 (B 31) | 0 (B 15) | ½ (W 57) | ½ (B 80) | 0 (W 53) | ½ (B 70) | ½ (W 98) | 7 | 87.5 | 93 | 2517 |
| 87 | (Ukraine) Ruslan Ponomariov | 2639 | ½ (W 94) | ½ (B 123) | ½ (W 15) | ½ (B 61) | 1 (W 105) | 0 (B 70) | 1 (W 176) | ½ (B 122) | 1 (W 98) | ½ (B 64) | ½ (W 73) | 0 (B 55) | ½ (W 103) | 7 | 87.5 | 93 | 2494 |
| 88 | (Kazakhstan) Denis Makhnev | 2529 | 1 (W 230) | 0 (B 19) | 1 (W 219) | 1 (B 90) | 0 (W 34) | 1 (W 48) | 0 (B 12) | 0 (B 30) | ½ (W 172) | ½ (B 147) | 1 (W 129) | 1 (W 145) | 0 (B 38) | 7 | 86.5 | 90.5 | 2575 |
| 89 | (India) Adhiban Baskaran | 2503 | 1 (W 241) | 1 (B 106) | 0 (W 27) | 0 (B 34) | 1 (W 182) | 1 (B 51) | ½ (W 47) | 0 (B 24) | 0 (W 72) | ½ (B 129) | 0 (W 69) | 1 (B 202) | 1 (W 167) | 7 | 86 | 89.5 | 2500 |
| 90 | (Azerbaijan) Teimour Radjabov | 2661 | 1 (B 100) | 1 (W 32) | 0 (B 110) | 0 (W 88) | ½ (B 181) | 1 (W 96) | ½ (W 151) | 1 (B 162) | ½ (W 80) | 1 (B 72) | ½ (W 43) | 0 (B 36) | (0) | 7 | 84.5 | 91 | 2502 |
| 91 | (FIDE) Sergey Sklokin | 2187 | 1 (W 165) | ½ (B 17) | 0 (W 47) | 1 (B 247) | ½ (W 116) | 1 (B 80) | 0 (W 68) | 0 (B 72) | ½ (W 174) | 1 (B 105) | 1 (W 104) | 0 (B 64) | ½ (W 142) | 7 | 84.5 | 90 | 2564 |
| 92 | (Egypt) Bassem Amin | 2593 | 0 (W 62) | 1 (B 147) | 1 (W 122) | ½ (B 171) | ½ (W 37) | 0 (B 42) | 1 (W 211) | 0 (B 79) | 1 (W 132) | 1 (B 128) | 0 (W 46) | ½ (B 65) | ½ (W 96) | 7 | 84 | 88.5 | 2454 |
| 93 | (India) Abhimanyu Puranik | 2542 | 1 (B 198) | ½ (W 28) | ½ (B 58) | 0 (W 8) | 0 (B 117) | ½ (W 186) | ½ (B 164) | 1 (W 126) | 1 (B 153) | 0 (W 48) | 1 (W 147) | 0 (B 52) | 1 (B 150) | 7 | 83.5 | 89 | 2523 |
| 94 | (Mongolia) Sugaryn Gan-Erdene | 2434 | ½ (B 87) | 0 (W 146) | ½ (B 163) | 1 (W 239) | ½ (B 192) | 1 (W 136) | ½ (B 22) | ½ (W 71) | 1 (B 74) | 1 (W 112) | 0 (B 35) | 0 (W 75) | ½ (B 82) | 7 | 83.5 | 87 | 2570 |
| 95 | (India) S. L. Narayanan | 2582 | 1 (W 164) | ½ (B 119) | ½ (W 30) | 0 (B 200) | 1 (W 132) | 1 (B 160) | 1 (W 172) | 0 (B 3) | 0 (W 40) | ½ (B 171) | ½ (W 77) | 0 (B 37) | 1 (W 157) | 7 | 83 | 88 | 2521 |
| 96 | (Uzbekistan) Jakhongir Vakhidov | 2494 | ½ (B 18) | ½ (W 13) | 1 (B 212) | ½ (W 22) | 0 (B 112) | 0 (B 90) | 1 (W 217) | 0 (W 179) | ½ (B 150) | ½ (W 108) | 1 (B 188) | 1 (W 124) | ½ (B 92) | 7 | 82 | 86.5 | 2519 |
| 97 | (Mexico) José Martínez Alcántara | 2641 | 1 (W 211) | ½ (B 115) | 1 (W 103) | ½ (B 36) | 0 (W 81) | ½ (B 151) | ½ (W 67) | 0 (B 41) | ½ (W 105) | ½ (B 148) | ½ (W 123) | 1 (B 181) | ½ (W 101) | 7 | 82 | 86.5 | 2498 |
| 98 | (Iran) Bardiya Daneshvar | 2498 | 0 (W 40) | 1 (B 133) | 1 (W 239) | ½ (B 84) | 0 (B 29) | 0 (W 13) | 1 (B 204) | 1 (W 200) | 0 (B 87) | 1 (W 179) | 0 (B 112) | 1 (W 119) | ½ (B 86) | 7 | 81.5 | 85 | 2542 |
| 99 | (Uzbekistan) Khumoyun Begmuratov | 2435 | 0 (W 118) | 1 (B 210) | 1 (W 72) | ½ (B 74) | 0 (B 82) | ½ (W 107) | ½ (B 192) | 1 (W 156) | 0 (B 63) | ½ (W 109) | 1 (W 158) | ½ (B 116) | ½ (W 84) | 7 | 81 | 86 | 2576 |
| 100 | (Iran) Mahdi Gholami Orimi | 2461 | 0 (W 90) | 1 (B 167) | 0 (W 59) | 1 (B 219) | 1 (W 106) | 1 (B 177) | 0 (W 16) | 0 (B 45) | 0 (W 73) | ½ (B 175) | ½ (W 182) | 1 (B 152) | 1 (W 158) | 7 | 80.5 | 85 | 2538 |
| 101 | (Uzbekistan) Shamsiddin Vokhidov | 2536 | 0 (W 195) | 1 (B 189) | 1 (W 217) | ½ (B 26) | 0 (W 24) | ½ (B 46) | 0 (W 119) | ½ (B 186) | 1 (W 133) | 1 (B 159) | 0 (B 71) | 1 (W 173) | ½ (B 97) | 7 | 80.5 | 85 | 2475 |
| 102 | (FIDE) Arseniy Nesterov | 2540 | ½ (W 208) | 1 (B 206) | ½ (W 145) | ½ (B 30) | 0 (W 23) | 0 (B 180) | ½ (W 186) | 1 (B 188) | 1 (W 121) | 1 (B 152) | 0 (W 51) | 1 (W 142) | 0 (B 50) | 7 | 80 | 85 | 2557 |
| 103 | (India) Pranesh M | 2520 | 1 (B 223) | ½ (W 50) | 0 (B 97) | 1 (W 69) | 0 (B 58) | 1 (W 212) | 0 (W 24) | 0 (B 147) | 1 (W 213) | 1 (B 215) | 1 (W 66) | 0 (B 71) | ½ (B 87) | 7 | 80 | 84.5 | 2514 |
| 104 | (Serbia) Aleksandar Inđić | 2587 | 0 (B 110) | 1 (W 194) | 0 (B 155) | 1 (W 147) | ½ (B 185) | 1 (W 126) | 1 (B 200) | ½ (W 40) | 0 (B 27) | ½ (W 149) | 0 (B 91) | ½ (W 153) | 1 (B 160) | 7 | 77.5 | 82.5 | 2475 |
| 105 | (India) Bharath Subramaniyam | 2475 | 0 (B 12) | 0 (W 138) | 1 (B 198) | 1 (W 226) | 0 (B 87) | ½ (B 221) | 1 (W 129) | ½ (W 50) | ½ (B 97) | 0 (W 91) | ½ (B 179) | 1 (W 200) | 1 (B 146) | 7 | 77.5 | 81.5 | 2463 |
| 106 | (United Arab Emirates) Salem Saleh | 2621 | 1 (B 161) | 0 (W 89) | 0 (B 65) | 1 (W 159) | 0 (B 100) | ½ (W 193) | ½ (B 126) | ½ (W 160) | 1 (B 185) | ½ (W 157) | 0 (B 127) | 1 (W 148) | 1 (B 153) | 7 | 76 | 81.5 | 2456 |
| 107 | (Spain) José Carlos Ibarra Jeréz | 2553 | ½ (W 206) | 0 (B 182) | 1 (W 46) | ½ (B 79) | ½ (W 122) | ½ (B 99) | 0 (W 183) | 0 (B 121) | ½ (W 203) | 1 (B 133) | 1 (W 169) | ½ (B 123) | 1 (W 149) | 7 | 76 | 81 | 2407 |
| 108 | (FIDE) Artiom Stribuk | 2393 | 0 (W 16) | 0 (B 225) | 1 (W 237) | 0 (B 187) | 1 (W 230) | 0 (B 72) | 0 (W 228) | 1 (B 167) | 1 (W 208) | ½ (B 96) | 1 (W 176) | 1 (B 174) | ½ (W 109) | 7 | 71.5 | 75 | 2439 |
| 109 | (FIDE) Evgeniy Najer | 2560 | 0 (W 175) | 0 (B 150) | 0 (W 207) | 1 (B 237) | 1 (W 215) | ½ (B 189) | 1 (W 139) | 0 (B 77) | 1 (W 211) | ½ (B 99) | 1 (W 180) | ½ (W 117) | ½ (B 108) | 7 | 70.5 | 74 | 2392 |
| 110 | (India) Goutham Krishna H | 2392 | 1 (W 104) | 1 (B 16) | 1 (W 90) | ½ (B 27) | ½ (W 9) | 0 (B 4) | 1 (W 45) | 0 (B 13) | 0 (W 84) | 0 (B 73) | 1 (W 162) | 0 (B 54) | ½ (W 115) | 6.5 | 96 | 102.5 | 2612 |
| 111 | (Spain) David Antón Guijarro | 2619 | 1 (W 183) | 1 (B 174) | 1 (W 25) | 0 (W 1) | 1 (B 135) | 1 (B 36) | ½ (W 6) | 0 (W 20) | 0 (B 7) | ½ (B 115) | 0 (W 80) | ½ (B 61) | 0 (W 70) | 6.5 | 94 | 99.5 | 2587 |
| 112 | (Spain) Maksim Chigaev | 2598 | ½ (W 172) | 1 (B 46) | ½ (W 119) | ½ (B 37) | 1 (W 96) | 1 (B 40) | ½ (W 3) | 0 (B 23) | ½ (W 42) | 0 (B 94) | 1 (W 98) | 0 (B 60) | 0 (W 61) | 6.5 | 92.5 | 98 | 2531 |
| 113 | (Montenegro) Nikita Petrov | 2543 | 1 (W 228) | ½ (B 145) | 0 (W 20) | 1 (B 193) | ½ (W 30) | 1 (W 150) | ½ (B 5) | ½ (B 9) | 0 (W 18) | 0 (B 46) | 1 (W 143) | 0 (B 69) | ½ (W 122) | 6.5 | 90.5 | 94.5 | 2560 |
| 114 | (China) Bu Xiangzhi | 2587 | 1 (W 150) | ½ (B 37) | 1 (W 182) | ½ (B 40) | ½ (W 145) | ½ (W 8) | ½ (B 173) | ½ (B 42) | 0 (W 83) | 1 (W 127) | ½ (B 60) | 0 (B 41) | 0 (W 67) | 6.5 | 87.5 | 93 | 2519 |
| 115 | (FIDE) Aleksandr Rakhmanov | 2522 | 1 (B 243) | ½ (W 97) | ½ (B 28) | ½ (W 11) | 0 (B 144) | ½ (W 69) | ½ (B 150) | 1 (W 159) | 1 (B 119) | ½ (W 111) | 0 (B 29) | 0 (W 50) | ½ (B 110) | 6.5 | 86 | 89 | 2539 |
| 116 | (FIDE) David Paravyan | 2570 | 1 (B 204) | 0 (W 1) | ½ (B 153) | 1 (W 139) | ½ (B 91) | 1 (W 117) | 0 (B 18) | ½ (W 149) | ½ (B 81) | ½ (W 181) | ½ (B 65) | ½ (W 99) | 0 (B 62) | 6.5 | 85.5 | 90.5 | 2494 |
| 117 | (Mexico) Sion Radamantys Galaviz | 2418 | 1 (W 225) | 0 (B 66) | 1 (W 165) | 0 (B 17) | 1 (W 93) | 0 (B 116) | ½ (W 55) | 0 (B 43) | ½ (B 232) | 1 (W 166) | 1 (W 137) | ½ (B 109) | 0 (W 72) | 6.5 | 84.5 | 90.5 | 2563 |
| 118 | (Sweden) Nils Grandelius | 2639 | 1 (B 99) | ½ (W 70) | 0 (B 60) | ½ (W 176) | 0 (B 42) | 1 (W 121) | 1 (B 120) | 1 (W 127) | 0 (B 25) | 0 (W 81) | ½ (B 155) | ½ (W 160) | ½ (B 135) | 6.5 | 83.5 | 89 | 2482 |
| 119 | (Armenia) Robert Piliposyan | 2382 | 1 (B 140) | ½ (W 95) | ½ (B 112) | 0 (W 78) | 0 (B 32) | 1 (W 170) | 1 (B 101) | ½ (W 31) | 0 (W 115) | ½ (B 184) | ½ (W 151) | 0 (B 98) | 1 (W 181) | 6.5 | 82 | 87.5 | 2546 |
| 120 | (France) Marco Materia | 2490 | 0 (B 3) | 1 (W 226) | 1 (B 240) | 1 (W 49) | 0 (W 4) | 0 (B 84) | 0 (W 118) | 1 (B 163) | 0 (W 48) | 0 (B 69) | 1 (W 209) | ½ (B 175) | 1 (W 189) | 6.5 | 82 | 85.5 | 2501 |
| 121 | (FIDE) Erdem Khubukshanov | 2419 | 0 (B 71) | 1 (W 235) | 0 (B 78) | 1 (W 52) | 0 (B 131) | 0 (B 118) | 1 (W 209) | 1 (W 107) | 0 (B 102) | ½ (W 136) | 1 (B 190) | 1 (W 151) | 0 (B 57) | 6.5 | 80 | 84 | 2545 |
| 122 | (Kazakhstan) Zhandos Agmanov | 2436 | 0 (B 50) | 1 (W 236) | 0 (B 92) | 1 (W 245) | ½ (B 107) | ½ (W 192) | 1 (B 75) | ½ (W 87) | 0 (B 71) | 0 (W 74) | ½ (B 138) | 1 (W 187) | ½ (B 113) | 6.5 | 79 | 81.5 | 2520 |
| 123 | (FIDE) Sergei Lobanov | 2452 | ½ (B 58) | ½ (W 87) | 0 (B 11) | 0 (W 212) | 0 (B 205) | 1 (W 223) | 1 (B 198) | ½ (W 170) | 1 (B 190) | ½ (W 52) | ½ (B 97) | ½ (W 107) | ½ (B 140) | 6.5 | 78.5 | 83 | 2522 |
| 124 | (Kazakhstan) Daniyal Sapenov | 2375 | 0 (W 45) | ½ (B 137) | 1 (W 184) | 0 (B 125) | ½ (W 41) | 0 (B 77) | 1 (W 191) | ½ (B 148) | 1 (W 214) | 0 (B 61) | 1 (W 178) | 0 (B 96) | 1 (W 171) | 6.5 | 78.5 | 83 | 2501 |
| 125 | (Iran) Pouya Idani | 2556 | ½ (B 196) | 0 (W 69) | 1 (B 179) | 1 (W 124) | 0 (B 12) | ½ (W 185) | ½ (B 154) | ½ (W 181) | ½ (B 157) | 1 (W 161) | 0 (B 58) | ½ (W 149) | ½ (B 143) | 6.5 | 77.5 | 83 | 2465 |
| 126 | (Ukraine) Ihor Samunenkov | 2443 | 0 (W 152) | 1 (B 237) | 1 (W 187) | 0 (B 16) | ½ (W 64) | 0 (B 104) | ½ (W 106) | 0 (B 93) | 1 (W 209) | 0 (B 142) | 1 (W 191) | ½ (B 137) | 1 (W 177) | 6.5 | 77.5 | 81 | 2529 |
| 127 | (India) Mitrabha Guha | 2487 | 0 (W 7) | 0 (B 217) | 1 (W 230) | 1 (B 215) | ½ (W 224) | 1 (B 246) | ½ (W 152) | 0 (B 118) | 1 (W 225) | 0 (B 114) | 1 (W 106) | ½ (B 84) | 0 (W 66) | 6.5 | 76.5 | 80.5 | 2590 |
| 128 | (Greece) Dimitris Alexakis | 2501 | 1 (W 244) | ½ (B 177) | 0 (W 4) | 0 (B 83) | ½ (W 193) | 1 (B 202) | 1 (W 213) | 0 (B 10) | 1 (W 175) | 0 (W 92) | 0 (B 145) | 1 (B 203) | ½ (W 129) | 6.5 | 76.5 | 79.5 | 2468 |
| 129 | (Kazakhstan) Edgar Mamedov | 2302 | 1 (W 232) | 0 (B 63) | ½ (W 247) | 0 (B 174) | ½ (W 214) | ½ (B 148) | 0 (B 105) | 1 (W 178) | 1 (B 135) | ½ (W 89) | 0 (B 88) | 1 (W 168) | ½ (B 128) | 6.5 | 76 | 80.5 | 2506 |
| 130 | (Canada) Shawn Rodrigue-Lemieux | 2478 | ½ (W 20) | 0 (B 224) | 1 (W 191) | 0 (B 24) | ½ (W 133) | ½ (B 217) | ½ (W 163) | 1 (B 207) | 0 (W 152) | ½ (B 189) | 1 (W 215) | 1 (W 144) | 0 (B 74) | 6.5 | 75.5 | 80 | 2495 |
| 131 | (France) Augustin Droin | 2538 | 1 (W 167) | 0 (B 27) | 1 (W 213) | 0 (B 145) | 1 (W 121) | 0 (B 83) | 0 (W 79) | 0 (B 164) | 1 (W 206) | 0 (B 143) | ½ (W 163) | 1 (B 221) | 1 (W 183) | 6.5 | 75 | 79.5 | 2424 |
| 132 | (Kazakhstan) Arystan Isanzhulov | 2456 | 0 (B 56) | 0 (W 227) | 1 (B 233) | 1 (W 205) | 0 (B 95) | 1 (W 207) | 0 (B 49) | 1 (W 140) | 0 (B 92) | 1 (W 170) | 0 (B 52) | ½ (B 177) | 1 (W 175) | 6.5 | 75 | 79 | 2495 |
| 133 | (Kazakhstan) Ergali Suleimen | 2372 | 0 (B 82) | 0 (W 98) | ½ (B 229) | 1 (W 141) | ½ (B 130) | ½ (W 166) | 0 (B 43) | 1 (W 218) | 0 (B 101) | 0 (W 107) | 1 (W 211) | 1 (B 178) | 1 (W 184) | 6.5 | 75 | 79 | 2467 |
| 134 | (FIDE) Mikhail Kobalia | 2518 | 1 (W 231) | ½ (B 246) | ½ (W 34) | 0 (B 10) | 1 (W 213) | 0 (W 28) | 0 (B 69) | 0 (B 215) | 1 (W 219) | ½ (B 169) | ½ (W 203) | ½ (B 164) | 1 (W 172) | 6.5 | 75 | 79 | 2462 |
| 135 | (Italy) Lorenzo Lodici | 2499 | 0 (B 1) | 1 (W 221) | 1 (B 138) | 1 (W 146) | 0 (W 111) | 0 (B 86) | 0 (W 175) | ½ (B 213) | 0 (W 129) | ½ (B 204) | 1 (W 219) | 1 (B 182) | ½ (W 118) | 6.5 | 74.5 | 79 | 2475 |
| 136 | (India) Krishnan Sasikiran | 2548 | 0 (W 83) | 1 (B 164) | ½ (W 193) | ½ (B 182) | ½ (W 180) | 0 (B 94) | 0 (W 147) | ½ (B 206) | 1 (W 163) | ½ (B 121) | 1 (W 189) | 1 (B 172) | 0 (W 65) | 6.5 | 73.5 | 78.5 | 2391 |
| 137 | (Turkey) Mustafa Yılmaz | 2560 | 0 (B 21) | ½ (W 124) | 0 (B 139) | ½ (W 189) | 0 (B 163) | 1 (W 227) | ½ (B 182) | 1 (W 204) | 1 (B 201) | ½ (W 155) | 0 (B 117) | ½ (W 126) | 1 (B 173) | 6.5 | 73 | 77 | 2392 |
| 138 | (India) Harikrishnan A Ra | 2293 | 0 (W 73) | 1 (B 105) | 0 (W 135) | ½ (B 214) | 0 (W 178) | 1 (B 197) | 0 (W 171) | 1 (B 139) | 0 (W 184) | 1 (B 211) | ½ (W 122) | ½ (B 141) | 1 (W 176) | 6.5 | 72.5 | 77 | 2480 |
| 139 | (Armenia) Artur Davtyan | 2422 | 0 (W 177) | ½ (B 191) | 1 (W 137) | 0 (B 116) | 0 (W 53) | 1 (B 142) | 0 (B 109) | 0 (W 138) | 0 (B 182) | 1 (W 227) | 1 (W 210) | 1 (B 215) | 1 (W 174) | 6.5 | 72.5 | 76.5 | 2434 |
| 140 | (Bosnia and Herzegovina) Bojan Maksimović | 2581 | 0 (W 119) | 0 (B 193) | 1 (W 228) | ½ (B 169) | 0 (W 46) | 1 (B 206) | ½ (W 148) | 0 (B 132) | 1 (W 202) | ½ (B 160) | ½ (W 159) | 1 (B 180) | ½ (W 123) | 6.5 | 72.5 | 76.5 | 2411 |
| 141 | (Greece) Stelios Halkias | 2492 | ½ (W 23) | 0 (B 30) | 0 (W 206) | 0 (B 133) | 1 (B 240) | ½ (W 167) | 1 (B 226) | 0 (W 161) | 1 (B 196) | 0 (W 150) | 1 (B 220) | ½ (W 138) | 1 (B 179) | 6.5 | 72.5 | 76 | 2393 |
| 142 | (Poland) Radosław Wojtaszek | 2657 | 0 (B 160) | ½ (W 179) | 1 (B 227) | 0 (W 67) | 0 (B 149) | 0 (W 139) | ½ (B 220) | 1 (W 198) | 1 (B 216) | 1 (W 126) | 1 (W 184) | 0 (B 102) | ½ (B 91) | 6.5 | 72 | 76 | 2389 |
| 143 | (Uzbekistan) Mukhammadzokhid Suyarov | 2411 | 0 (W 66) | 0 (B 26) | 1 (W 238) | 0 (B 225) | 0 (W 207) | 1 (B 237) | 1 (W 205) | 0 (B 176) | 1 (W 228) | 1 (W 131) | 0 (B 113) | 1 (B 165) | ½ (W 125) | 6.5 | 70.5 | 74 | 2453 |
| 144 | (Spain) Jaime Santos Latasa | 2667 | 1 (W 214) | 1 (B 54) | 0 (W 80) | ½ (B 55) | 1 (W 115) | 0 (B 17) | ½ (W 162) | 1 (B 174) | ½ (W 45) | 0 (B 68) | 0 (W 72) | 0 (B 130) | ½ (W 154) | 6 | 85.5 | 90 | 2533 |
| 145 | (Hungary) Richárd Rapport | 2702 | 1 (B 67) | ½ (W 113) | ½ (B 102) | 1 (W 131) | ½ (B 114) | 0 (W 33) | ½ (B 63) | 0 (W 70) | 1 (B 168) | 0 (W 32) | 1 (W 128) | 0 (B 88) | (0) | 6 | 85 | 91 | 2534 |
| 146 | (India) Pentala Harikrishna | 2623 | ½ (W 149) | 1 (B 94) | ½ (W 43) | 0 (B 135) | 1 (W 176) | ½ (B 67) | ½ (W 180) | ½ (B 183) | 1 (W 61) | 0 (B 55) | ½ (W 54) | 0 (B 77) | 0 (W 105) | 6 | 83.5 | 89 | 2481 |
| 147 | (FIDE) Mihail Nikitenko | 2407 | 0 (B 29) | 0 (W 92) | 1 (B 220) | 0 (B 104) | 1 (W 195) | ½ (W 52) | 1 (B 136) | 1 (W 103) | 0 (B 54) | ½ (W 88) | 0 (B 93) | ½ (W 156) | ½ (B 170) | 6 | 83.5 | 88 | 2532 |
| 148 | (Kosovo) Nderim Saraçi | 2460 | 0 (B 11) | 1 (W 220) | 1 (B 52) | 0 (W 85) | 0 (B 49) | ½ (W 129) | ½ (B 140) | ½ (W 124) | 1 (B 212) | ½ (W 97) | 0 (B 50) | 0 (B 106) | 1 (W 203) | 6 | 83 | 87.5 | 2520 |
| 149 | (United States) Nico Chasin | 2427 | ½ (B 146) | 0 (W 22) | 0 (B 190) | 1 (W 236) | 1 (W 142) | 1 (B 73) | ½ (W 158) | ½ (B 116) | ½ (W 44) | ½ (B 104) | 0 (W 45) | ½ (B 125) | 0 (B 107) | 6 | 83 | 86.5 | 2584 |
| 150 | (Kazakhstan) Aldiyar Ansat | 2392 | 0 (B 114) | 1 (W 109) | 1 (B 166) | 1 (W 170) | 0 (W 59) | 0 (B 113) | ½ (W 115) | 0 (B 48) | ½ (W 96) | 1 (B 141) | 1 (W 165) | 0 (B 44) | 0 (W 93) | 6 | 82.5 | 88.5 | 2568 |
| 151 | (Norway) Frode Urkedal | 2515 | 1 (W 234) | ½ (B 34) | ½ (W 246) | 0 (B 152) | 1 (W 175) | ½ (W 97) | ½ (B 90) | 1 (B 224) | 0 (W 9) | 0 (W 29) | ½ (B 119) | 0 (B 121) | ½ (W 164) | 6 | 82.5 | 86.5 | 2564 |
| 152 | (Ukraine) Olexandr Bortnyk | 2641 | 1 (B 126) | 0 (W 81) | 1 (B 181) | 1 (W 151) | ½ (B 57) | 0 (W 65) | ½ (B 127) | 0 (W 25) | 1 (B 130) | 0 (W 102) | 0 (B 157) | 0 (W 100) | 1 (B 200) | 6 | 81.5 | 86.5 | 2490 |
| 153 | (India) Aditya Mittal | 2440 | 0 (W 34) | 1 (B 231) | ½ (W 116) | ½ (B 51) | 1 (W 187) | ½ (B 74) | 0 (W 66) | ½ (B 73) | 0 (W 93) | ½ (B 177) | 1 (W 218) | ½ (B 104) | 0 (W 106) | 6 | 81.5 | 85.5 | 2552 |
| 154 | (India) Raja Rithvik R | 2428 | 0 (W 84) | 1 (B 234) | 1 (W 73) | 0 (B 45) | ½ (W 54) | ½ (B 55) | ½ (W 125) | 0 (B 53) | 0 (B 75) | 0 (W 187) | 1 (B 212) | 1 (W 213) | ½ (B 144) | 6 | 81 | 85 | 2526 |
| 155 | (India) P. Iniyan | 2450 | 0 (W 246) | 1 (B 238) | 1 (W 104) | ½ (B 158) | ½ (W 74) | 0 (B 68) | ½ (W 72) | 0 (B 64) | 1 (W 187) | ½ (B 137) | ½ (W 118) | 0 (B 66) | ½ (W 163) | 6 | 81 | 84.5 | 2567 |
| 156 | (Turkey) Emre Can | 2521 | 1 (W 237) | ½ (B 10) | 0 (W 9) | 1 (B 206) | 0 (W 26) | 0 (B 62) | 1 (W 189) | 0 (B 99) | 1 (W 186) | 0 (B 172) | ½ (W 164) | ½ (B 147) | ½ (W 169) | 6 | 80.5 | 84 | 2459 |
| 157 | (FIDE) Artem Uskov | 2463 | 0 (W 19) | 1 (B 207) | 1 (W 225) | 0 (B 59) | 0 (W 51) | 1 (B 209) | 1 (W 177) | 0 (B 158) | ½ (W 125) | ½ (B 106) | 1 (W 152) | 0 (W 85) | 0 (B 95) | 6 | 80 | 85 | 2583 |
| 158 | (India) Pranav V | 2595 | 1 (B 179) | 0 (W 76) | 1 (B 160) | ½ (W 155) | 0 (B 65) | 1 (W 181) | ½ (B 149) | 1 (W 157) | 0 (B 21) | 0 (W 70) | 0 (B 99) | 1 (W 185) | 0 (B 100) | 6 | 79.5 | 85 | 2450 |
| 159 | (Serbia) Kirill Klukin | 2421 | 0 (W 4) | 1 (B 241) | 0 (W 55) | 0 (B 106) | 1 (W 228) | 1 (B 191) | ½ (W 53) | 0 (B 115) | 1 (B 192) | 0 (W 101) | ½ (B 140) | ½ (W 170) | ½ (B 166) | 6 | 79.5 | 83 | 2484 |
| 160 | (Mongolia) Sumiya Bilguun | 2456 | 1 (W 142) | 0 (B 35) | 0 (W 158) | 1 (B 209) | 1 (W 225) | 0 (W 95) | 0 (B 51) | ½ (B 106) | ½ (W 177) | ½ (W 140) | 1 (B 213) | ½ (B 118) | 0 (W 104) | 6 | 79 | 83.5 | 2592 |
| 161 | (India) Sankalp Gupta | 2425 | 0 (W 106) | 1 (B 218) | 0 (W 54) | 1 (B 195) | ½ (W 73) | ½ (B 53) | 0 (W 80) | 1 (B 141) | ½ (W 165) | 0 (B 125) | ½ (W 177) | 0 (B 162) | 1 (W 206) | 6 | 79 | 83.5 | 2500 |
| 162 | (Georgia (country)) Levan Pantsulaia | 2518 | 1 (B 236) | ½ (W 86) | ½ (B 50) | 0 (W 28) | ½ (B 212) | 1 (W 204) | ½ (B 144) | 0 (W 90) | 1 (B 69) | 0 (W 51) | 0 (B 110) | 1 (W 161) | (0) | 6 | 78 | 84 | 2482 |
| 163 | (Syria) Mazen Fandi | 2326 | 0 (W 44) | ½ (B 184) | ½ (W 94) | 0 (B 77) | 1 (W 137) | ½ (B 214) | ½ (B 130) | 0 (W 120) | 0 (B 136) | 1 (W 207) | ½ (B 131) | 1 (W 222) | ½ (B 155) | 6 | 75.5 | 80 | 2499 |
| 164 | (Chinese Taipei) Adelard Bai | 2385 | 0 (B 95) | 0 (W 136) | 1 (B 223) | 0 (W 192) | 1 (B 227) | ½ (B 187) | ½ (W 93) | 1 (W 131) | 0 (B 32) | ½ (W 168) | ½ (B 156) | ½ (W 134) | ½ (B 151) | 6 | 75.5 | 79.5 | 2505 |
| 165 | (Netherlands) Max Warmerdam | 2537 | 0 (B 91) | 1 (W 204) | 0 (B 117) | 1 (W 221) | 1 (B 188) | 1 (W 216) | 0 (B 8) | 0 (W 21) | ½ (B 161) | ½ (W 200) | 0 (B 150) | 0 (W 143) | 1 (B 205) | 6 | 74.5 | 79 | 2404 |
| 166 | (Romania) David Gavrilescu | 2544 | 1 (W 209) | 0 (B 7) | 0 (W 150) | 1 (B 202) | 0 (W 79) | ½ (B 133) | ½ (W 188) | 1 (B 169) | 0 (W 180) | 0 (B 117) | 1 (W 217) | ½ (B 183) | ½ (W 159) | 6 | 73.5 | 78 | 2423 |
| 167 | (India) Harshavardhan G. B. | 2216 | 0 (B 131) | 0 (W 100) | 1 (B 199) | ½ (W 201) | 0 (B 52) | ½ (B 141) | 0 (W 202) | 0 (W 108) | 1 (B 231) | 1 (B 206) | 1 (W 194) | 1 (W 190) | 0 (B 89) | 6 | 73.5 | 77.5 | 2466 |
| 168 | (FIDE) Sergey Drygalov | 2489 | ½ (W 224) | 0 (B 20) | 1 (W 208) | 0 (B 23) | ½ (W 169) | 0 (B 213) | 1 (W 219) | 1 (B 228) | 0 (W 145) | ½ (B 164) | ½ (W 175) | 0 (B 129) | 1 (W 202) | 6 | 72.5 | 76.5 | 2463 |
| 169 | (FIDE) Roman Shogdzhiev | 2388 | 0 (B 33) | 0 (W 192) | 1 (B 243) | ½ (W 140) | ½ (B 168) | 0 (B 225) | 1 (W 195) | 0 (W 166) | 1 (B 226) | ½ (W 134) | 0 (B 107) | 1 (W 218) | ½ (B 156) | 6 | 71.5 | 74.5 | 2464 |
| 170 | (United States) Varuzhan Akobian | 2579 | 1 (W 189) | 0 (B 175) | 1 (W 183) | 0 (B 150) | 0 (W 211) | 0 (B 119) | 1 (W 203) | ½ (B 123) | ½ (W 215) | 0 (B 132) | 1 (W 204) | ½ (B 159) | ½ (W 147) | 6 | 68.5 | 73 | 2403 |
| 171 | (Norway) Johan-Sebastian Christiansen | 2469 | 0 (B 39) | 1 (W 205) | 1 (B 13) | ½ (W 92) | 0 (B 33) | 0 (W 71) | 1 (B 138) | 1 (W 192) | ½ (B 29) | ½ (W 95) | 0 (B 74) | 0 (W 82) | 0 (B 124) | 5.5 | 88 | 93 | 2562 |
| 172 | (Kyrgyzstan) Eldiar Orozbaev | 2405 | ½ (B 112) | 1 (W 190) | 1 (B 71) | 1 (W 29) | ½ (B 39) | 0 (W 56) | 0 (B 95) | 0 (W 49) | ½ (B 88) | 1 (W 156) | 0 (B 75) | 0 (W 136) | 0 (B 134) | 5.5 | 86.5 | 92 | 2589 |
| 173 | (Singapore) Siddharth Jagadeesh | 2413 | 0 (W 35) | 1 (B 244) | 1 (W 53) | ½ (B 68) | ½ (B 31) | 1 (W 75) | ½ (W 114) | 0 (B 66) | 0 (W 64) | 0 (B 174) | 1 (W 197) | 0 (B 101) | 0 (W 137) | 5.5 | 85.5 | 88.5 | 2559 |
| 174 | (Vietnam) Lê Tuấn Minh | 2516 | 1 (B 229) | 0 (W 111) | ½ (B 216) | 1 (W 129) | 1 (B 50) | ½ (W 11) | 0 (B 28) | 0 (W 144) | ½ (B 91) | 1 (W 173) | 0 (B 38) | 0 (W 108) | 0 (B 139) | 5.5 | 83 | 87 | 2496 |
| 175 | (Greece) Christos Krallis | 2355 | 1 (B 109) | 1 (W 170) | 0 (B 38) | 0 (W 14) | 0 (B 151) | 1 (W 222) | 1 (B 135) | 0 (W 78) | 0 (B 128) | ½ (W 100) | ½ (B 168) | ½ (W 120) | 0 (B 132) | 5.5 | 81.5 | 86 | 2526 |
| 176 | (Azerbaijan) Read Samadov | 2469 | 0 (W 27) | 1 (B 228) | ½ (W 51) | ½ (B 118) | 0 (B 146) | 1 (W 182) | 0 (B 87) | 1 (W 143) | 0 (B 50) | ½ (W 188) | 0 (B 108) | 1 (W 186) | 0 (B 138) | 5.5 | 80.5 | 84.5 | 2504 |
| 177 | (Germany) Rasmus Svane | 2619 | 1 (B 139) | ½ (W 128) | ½ (B 42) | ½ (W 65) | ½ (B 70) | 0 (W 100) | 0 (B 157) | ½ (W 185) | ½ (B 160) | ½ (W 153) | ½ (B 161) | ½ (W 132) | 0 (B 126) | 5.5 | 80 | 85.5 | 2462 |
| 178 | (FIDE) Maksim Tsaruk | 2462 | 0 (B 28) | 1 (W 233) | ½ (B 12) | 0 (W 71) | 1 (B 138) | 0 (W 63) | 0 (B 52) | 0 (B 129) | 1 (W 221) | 1 (W 212) | 0 (B 124) | 0 (W 133) | 1 (B 218) | 5.5 | 80 | 84 | 2442 |
| 179 | (Madagascar) Fy Antenaina Rakotomaharo | 2404 | 0 (W 158) | ½ (B 142) | 0 (W 125) | 1 (B 208) | 1 (W 197) | 0 (B 54) | 1 (W 232) | 1 (B 96) | 0 (W 55) | 0 (B 98) | ½ (W 105) | ½ (B 184) | 0 (W 141) | 5.5 | 79.5 | 84.5 | 2534 |
| 180 | (Turkey) Cem Kaan Gökerkan | 2428 | 0 (B 86) | 1 (W 229) | 0 (B 85) | 1 (W 240) | ½ (B 136) | 1 (W 102) | ½ (B 146) | 0 (W 22) | 1 (B 166) | 0 (W 31) | 0 (B 109) | 0 (W 140) | ½ (B 188) | 5.5 | 79.5 | 83 | 2518 |
| 181 | (Austria) Konstantin Peyrer | 2470 | 0 (W 9) | 1 (B 209) | 0 (W 152) | 1 (B 217) | ½ (W 90) | 0 (B 158) | 1 (W 208) | ½ (B 125) | 1 (W 224) | ½ (B 116) | 0 (W 47) | 0 (W 97) | 0 (B 119) | 5.5 | 79 | 83.5 | 2556 |
| 182 | (Vietnam) Dau Khuong Duy | 2331 | ½ (B 14) | 1 (W 107) | 0 (B 114) | ½ (W 136) | 0 (B 89) | 0 (B 176) | ½ (W 137) | 0 (B 197) | 1 (W 139) | 1 (W 201) | ½ (B 100) | 0 (W 135) | ½ (B 185) | 5.5 | 78.5 | 83.5 | 2511 |
| 183 | (Norway) Håvard Haug | 2424 | 0 (B 111) | 1 (W 242) | 0 (B 170) | 0 (W 13) | 1 (B 220) | 1 (W 205) | 1 (B 107) | ½ (W 146) | 0 (B 82) | 0 (W 75) | ½ (B 187) | ½ (W 166) | 0 (B 131) | 5.5 | 76.5 | 80 | 2528 |
| 184 | (China) Zhang Zhong | 2493 | 0 (B 2) | ½ (W 163) | 0 (B 124) | 1 (W 196) | 0 (B 204) | 1 (B 236) | 1 (W 221) | 0 (W 52) | 1 (B 138) | ½ (W 119) | 0 (B 142) | ½ (W 179) | 0 (B 133) | 5.5 | 76.5 | 80 | 2434 |
| 185 | (China) Xiao Tong | 2453 | 0 (W 10) | 1 (B 230) | 0 (W 16) | 1 (B 207) | ½ (W 104) | ½ (B 125) | 0 (W 225) | ½ (B 177) | 0 (W 106) | ½ (B 217) | 1 (W 205) | 0 (B 158) | ½ (W 182) | 5.5 | 75.5 | 79.5 | 2501 |
| 186 | (Armenia) Emin Ohanyan | 2384 | ½ (W 74) | 0 (B 47) | 0 (W 41) | ½ (B 210) | 1 (W 238) | ½ (B 93) | ½ (B 102) | ½ (W 101) | 0 (B 156) | 0 (W 190) | 1 (W 214) | 0 (B 176) | 1 (B 212) | 5.5 | 75.5 | 79 | 2474 |
| 187 | (India) Surya Shekhar Ganguly | 2585 | 1 (B 188) | 0 (W 21) | 0 (B 126) | 1 (W 108) | 0 (B 153) | ½ (W 164) | 0 (B 201) | 1 (W 216) | 0 (B 155) | 1 (B 154) | ½ (W 183) | 0 (B 122) | ½ (W 194) | 5.5 | 74 | 78.5 | 2414 |
| 188 | (FIDE) Nikolay Averin | 2387 | 0 (W 187) | 0 (B 59) | 1 (W 231) | 1 (B 72) | 0 (W 165) | ½ (B 232) | ½ (B 166) | 0 (W 102) | 1 (W 207) | ½ (B 176) | 0 (W 96) | ½ (B 197) | ½ (W 180) | 5.5 | 74 | 78 | 2503 |
| 189 | (Australia) James Morris | 2377 | 0 (B 170) | 0 (W 101) | ½ (B 236) | ½ (B 137) | 1 (W 210) | ½ (W 109) | 0 (B 156) | ½ (W 220) | 1 (B 191) | ½ (W 130) | 0 (B 136) | 1 (W 192) | 0 (B 120) | 5.5 | 72.5 | 76 | 2431 |
| 190 | (Bulgaria) Arkadij Naiditsch | 2574 | ½ (W 202) | 0 (B 172) | 1 (W 149) | 0 (B 15) | 0 (W 62) | 0 (B 208) | 1 (W 230) | 1 (B 217) | 0 (W 123) | 1 (B 186) | 0 (W 121) | 0 (B 167) | 1 (W 221) | 5.5 | 71 | 75 | 2369 |
| 191 | (Syria) Talab Rami | 1933 | 0 (B 60) | ½ (W 139) | 0 (B 130) | ½ (W 194) | 1 (B 203) | 0 (W 159) | 0 (B 124) | 1 (B 205) | 0 (W 189) | 1 (W 233) | 0 (B 126) | ½ (W 196) | 1 (B 213) | 5.5 | 70.5 | 74.5 | 2395 |
| 192 | (Ukraine) Andrei Volokitin | 2551 | 0 (W 219) | 1 (B 169) | 0 (W 200) | 1 (B 164) | ½ (W 94) | ½ (B 122) | ½ (W 99) | 0 (B 171) | 0 (W 159) | 0 (B 203) | 1 (W 195) | 0 (B 189) | 1 (W 217) | 5.5 | 69.5 | 74 | 2399 |
| 193 | (United States) Praveen Balakrishnan | 2393 | 0 (B 85) | 1 (W 140) | ½ (B 136) | 0 (W 113) | ½ (B 128) | ½ (B 106) | 0 (W 73) | 0 (W 212) | 0 (B 218) | 1 (W 229) | 0 (B 222) | 1 (B 227) | 1 (W 219) | 5.5 | 69.5 | 73.5 | 2428 |
| 194 | (Germany) Florian Grafl | 2379 | 0 (W 63) | 0 (B 104) | ½ (W 210) | ½ (B 191) | 1 (W 218) | 0 (B 41) | 0 (B 207) | 1 (W 195) | 0 (B 220) | 1 (W 228) | 0 (B 167) | 1 (W 209) | ½ (B 187) | 5.5 | 69 | 73 | 2307 |
| 195 | (Syria) Adm Khedr Aram Chekh | 2177 | 1 (B 101) | 0 (W 48) | 0 (B 32) | 0 (W 161) | 0 (B 147) | 1 (W 240) | 0 (B 169) | 0 (B 194) | 1 (W 241) | 1 (W 226) | 0 (B 192) | ½ (B 217) | 1 (W 214) | 5.5 | 69 | 72.5 | 2416 |
| 196 | (Brazil) Lucas Aguiar Cunha | 2334 | ½ (W 125) | 0 (B 74) | 0 (W 61) | 0 (B 184) | 0 (W 236) | ½ (B 218) | 1 (W 210) | 1 (B 238) | 0 (W 141) | 1 (B 208) | 0 (W 202) | ½ (B 191) | 1 (B 222) | 5.5 | 66.5 | 70 | 2336 |
| 197 | (FIDE) Pavel Ponkratov | 2511 | 1 (B 242) | ½ (W 71) | 0 (B 86) | 0 (W 216) | 0 (B 179) | 0 (W 138) | 1 (B 236) | 1 (W 182) | 0 (B 200) | 1 (W 220) | 0 (B 173) | ½ (W 188) | ½ (B 198) | 5.5 | 66 | 69.5 | 2366 |
| 198 | (Kazakhstan) Abilmansur Abdilkhair | 2262 | 0 (W 93) | 0 (B 214) | 0 (W 105) | 1 (B 234) | 0 (W 232) | 1 (B 210) | 0 (W 123) | 0 (B 142) | 1 (W 245) | 0 (B 202) | 1 (W 242) | 1 (B 204) | ½ (W 197) | 5.5 | 65.5 | 68 | 2374 |
| 199 | (Italy) Nicola Altini | 2494 | 0 (W 6) | 0 (B 213) | 0 (W 167) | 1 (B 231) | 0 (W 209) | ½ (B 230) | 0 (W 218) | ½ (B 245) | 1 (W 237) | 0 (B 205) | 1 (W 208) | ½ (B 219) | 1 (W 215) | 5.5 | 59.5 | 62 | 2261 |
| 200 | (Armenia) Mamikon Gharibyan | 2414 | 0 (B 38) | 1 (W 245) | 1 (B 192) | 1 (W 95) | ½ (W 66) | 0 (B 35) | 0 (W 104) | 0 (B 98) | 1 (W 197) | ½ (B 165) | 0 (W 44) | 0 (B 105) | 0 (W 152) | 5 | 82.5 | 85 | 2563 |
| 201 | (Kazakhstan) Alisher Suleymenov | 2432 | ½ (W 51) | ½ (B 24) | 0 (W 44) | ½ (B 167) | 1 (W 206) | 0 (B 64) | 1 (W 187) | 0 (B 55) | 0 (W 137) | 0 (B 182) | 0 (W 221) | ½ (B 230) | 1 (W 233) | 5 | 77 | 81 | 2460 |
| 202 | (Switzerland) Gabriel Gaehwiler | 2365 | ½ (B 190) | 0 (W 14) | ½ (B 222) | 0 (W 166) | 1 (B 245) | 0 (W 128) | 1 (B 167) | 0 (W 32) | 0 (B 140) | 1 (W 198) | 1 (B 196) | 0 (W 89) | 0 (B 168) | 5 | 76 | 78.5 | 2465 |
| 203 | (Egypt) Hamed Wafa | 2365 | 0 (W 68) | 0 (B 55) | 1 (W 234) | 0 (B 73) | 0 (W 191) | 1 (B 238) | 0 (B 170) | 1 (W 227) | ½ (B 107) | 1 (W 192) | ½ (B 134) | 0 (W 128) | 0 (B 148) | 5 | 74 | 77.5 | 2428 |
| 204 | (Egypt) Mohamed Ezat | 2358 | 0 (W 116) | 0 (B 165) | 1 (W 218) | ½ (B 53) | 1 (W 184) | 0 (B 162) | 0 (W 98) | 0 (B 137) | 1 (B 233) | ½ (W 135) | 0 (B 170) | 0 (W 198) | 1 (B 229) | 5 | 72.5 | 76.5 | 2441 |
| 205 | (Kazakhstan) Mark Smirnov | 2274 | 0 (W 54) | 0 (B 171) | 1 (W 232) | 0 (B 132) | 1 (W 123) | 0 (B 183) | 0 (B 143) | 0 (W 191) | 1 (B 223) | 1 (W 199) | 0 (B 185) | 1 (B 216) | 0 (W 165) | 5 | 71.5 | 76 | 2439 |
| 206 | (India) Rao Sharan | 2320 | ½ (B 107) | 0 (W 102) | 1 (B 141) | 0 (W 156) | 0 (B 201) | 0 (W 140) | 1 (B 229) | ½ (W 136) | 0 (B 131) | 0 (W 167) | 1 (B 243) | 1 (W 220) | 0 (B 161) | 5 | 71.5 | 74.5 | 2428 |
| 207 | (Kazakhstan) Miras Assylov | 2223 | 0 (B 57) | 0 (W 157) | 1 (B 109) | 0 (W 185) | 1 (B 143) | 0 (B 132) | 1 (W 194) | 0 (W 130) | 0 (B 188) | 0 (B 163) | 0 (W 216) | 1 (W 239) | 1 (B 226) | 5 | 71 | 74.5 | 2429 |
| 208 | (United Arab Emirates) Sedrani Ammar | 2237 | ½ (B 102) | 0 (W 8) | 0 (B 168) | 0 (W 179) | 1 (B 229) | 1 (W 190) | 0 (B 181) | ½ (W 222) | 0 (B 108) | 0 (W 196) | 0 (B 199) | 1 (W 243) | 1 (B 231) | 5 | 69 | 72 | 2426 |
| 209 | (Denmark) Bondo Medhus Vitus | 2283 | 0 (B 166) | 0 (W 181) | 1 (B 235) | 0 (W 160) | 1 (B 199) | 0 (W 157) | 0 (B 121) | 1 (W 231) | 0 (B 126) | 1 (W 236) | 0 (B 120) | 0 (B 194) | 1 (W 230) | 5 | 66 | 69.5 | 2376 |
| 210 | (Palestine) Mohammed Damaj | 2081 | 0 (B 81) | 0 (W 99) | ½ (B 194) | ½ (W 186) | 0 (B 189) | 0 (W 198) | 0 (B 196) | 1 (W 229) | ½ (B 227) | 1 (W 223) | 0 (B 139) | ½ (W 226) | 1 (B 228) | 5 | 64.5 | 68.5 | 2329 |
| 211 | (Chile) Pablo Salinas Herrera | 2442 | 0 (B 97) | 1 (W 223) | 0 (B 49) | 1 (W 227) | 1 (B 170) | 0 (W 31) | 0 (B 92) | ½ (W 75) | 0 (B 109) | 0 (W 138) | 0 (B 133) | 0 (W 212) | 1 (B 236) | 4.5 | 77 | 80.5 | 2438 |
| 212 | (Kazakhstan) Danis Kuandykuly | 2219 | 1 (W 55) | 0 (B 45) | 0 (W 96) | 1 (B 123) | ½ (W 162) | 0 (B 103) | 0 (W 214) | 1 (B 193) | 0 (W 148) | 0 (B 178) | 0 (W 154) | 1 (B 211) | 0 (W 186) | 4.5 | 76 | 80.5 | 2479 |
| 213 | (Japan) Trần Thanh Tú | 2364 | 0 (B 31) | 1 (W 199) | 0 (B 131) | 1 (W 222) | 0 (B 134) | 1 (W 168) | 0 (B 128) | ½ (W 135) | 0 (B 103) | 1 (B 214) | 0 (W 160) | 0 (B 154) | 0 (W 191) | 4.5 | 75 | 79.5 | 2498 |
| 214 | (Iceland) Vignir Vatnar Stefansson | 2463 | 0 (B 144) | 1 (W 198) | 0 (B 5) | ½ (W 138) | ½ (B 129) | ½ (W 163) | 1 (B 212) | 0 (W 54) | 0 (B 124) | 0 (W 213) | 0 (B 186) | 1 (W 231) | 0 (B 195) | 4.5 | 74.5 | 78.5 | 2385 |
| 215 | (Egypt) David George Samir | 2334 | 0 (B 78) | 0 (W 67) | 1 (B 242) | 0 (W 127) | 0 (B 109) | 1 (W 245) | 1 (B 222) | 1 (W 134) | ½ (B 170) | 0 (W 103) | 0 (B 130) | 0 (W 139) | 0 (B 199) | 4.5 | 74 | 76.5 | 2468 |
| 216 | (Lithuania) Zanas Nainys | 2372 | 0 (W 17) | 1 (B 232) | ½ (W 174) | 1 (B 197) | ½ (W 68) | 0 (B 165) | 0 (W 41) | 0 (B 187) | 0 (W 142) | 0 (B 218) | 1 (B 207) | 0 (W 205) | ½ (B 220) | 4.5 | 73.5 | 78 | 2473 |
| 217 | (Kazakhstan) Sauat Nurgaliyev | 2350 | 0 (B 75) | 1 (W 127) | 0 (B 101) | 0 (W 181) | 1 (B 239) | ½ (W 130) | 0 (B 96) | 0 (W 190) | 1 (B 222) | ½ (W 185) | 0 (B 166) | ½ (W 195) | 0 (B 192) | 4.5 | 72.5 | 76 | 2485 |
| 218 | (Singapore) Ashwath Kaushik | 2009 | 0 (B 70) | 0 (W 161) | 0 (B 204) | 1 (W 233) | 0 (B 194) | ½ (W 196) | 1 (B 199) | 0 (B 133) | 1 (W 193) | 1 (W 216) | 0 (B 153) | 0 (B 169) | 0 (W 178) | 4.5 | 69 | 73 | 2411 |
| 219 | (Morocco) Mohamed Tissir | 2310 | 1 (B 192) | 0 (W 82) | 0 (B 88) | 0 (W 100) | 0 (B 222) | 1 (W 239) | 0 (B 168) | 1 (W 223) | 0 (B 134) | 1 (W 243) | 0 (B 135) | ½ (W 199) | 0 (B 193) | 4.5 | 69 | 72 | 2436 |
| 220 | (United Arab Emirates) Omran Al Hosani | 2174 | 0 (W 53) | 0 (B 148) | 0 (W 147) | 1 (B 241) | 0 (W 183) | 1 (B 235) | ½ (W 142) | ½ (B 189) | 1 (W 194) | 0 (B 197) | 0 (W 141) | 0 (B 206) | ½ (W 216) | 4.5 | 68.5 | 72 | 2407 |
| 221 | (Qatar) Husain Aziz | 2334 | 0 (W 72) | 0 (B 135) | 1 (W 241) | 0 (B 165) | 1 (B 244) | ½ (W 105) | 0 (B 184) | 0 (W 232) | 0 (B 178) | 1 (W 234) | 1 (B 201) | 0 (W 131) | 0 (B 190) | 4.5 | 68.5 | 71.5 | 2419 |
| 222 | (Bangladesh) Niaz Murshed | 2496 | ½ (W 30) | 0 (B 23) | ½ (W 202) | 0 (B 213) | 1 (W 219) | 0 (B 175) | 0 (W 215) | ½ (B 208) | 0 (W 217) | 1 (B 230) | 1 (W 193) | 0 (B 163) | 0 (W 196) | 4.5 | 67.5 | 71.5 | 2403 |
| 223 | (Saudi Arabia) Ahmed Abdullah Alrehaili | 2107 | 0 (W 103) | 0 (B 211) | 0 (W 164) | 0 (B 228) | 1 (W 241) | 0 (B 123) | 1 (W 235) | 0 (B 219) | 0 (W 205) | 0 (B 210) | ½ (B 240) | 1 (W 245) | 1 (B 242) | 4.5 | 57 | 59.5 | 2209 |
| 224 | (Poland) Jan-Krzysztof Duda | 2711 | ½ (B 168) | 1 (W 130) | ½ (B 14) | 0 (W 57) | ½ (B 127) | 1 (W 43) | ½ (B 74) | 0 (W 151) | 0 (B 181) | (0) | (0) | (0) | (0) | 4 | 74 | 78 | 2513 |
| 225 | (India) Raunak Sadhwani | 2611 | 0 (B 117) | 1 (W 108) | 0 (B 157) | 1 (W 143) | 0 (B 160) | 1 (W 169) | 1 (B 185) | 0 (W 67) | 0 (B 127) | (0) | (0) | (0) | (0) | 4 | 69.5 | 73.5 | 2439 |
| 226 | (Montenegro) Armin Musović | 2318 | 0 (W 64) | 0 (B 120) | 1 (W 244) | 0 (B 105) | 0 (W 72) | 1 (B 231) | 0 (W 141) | 1 (B 237) | 0 (W 169) | 0 (B 195) | ½ (W 236) | ½ (B 210) | 0 (W 207) | 4 | 67.5 | 70.5 | 2311 |
| 227 | (Mongolia) Tsogtbileg Anand | 2152 | 0 (W 36) | 1 (B 132) | 0 (W 142) | 0 (B 211) | 0 (W 164) | 0 (B 137) | 1 (W 241) | 0 (B 203) | ½ (W 210) | 0 (B 139) | 1 (B 245) | 0 (W 193) | ½ (W 234) | 4 | 67.5 | 70 | 2352 |
| 228 | (Luxembourg) Fred Berend | 2264 | 0 (B 113) | 0 (W 176) | 0 (B 140) | 1 (W 223) | 0 (B 159) | 1 (W 244) | 1 (B 108) | 0 (W 168) | 0 (B 143) | 0 (B 194) | 0 (W 231) | 1 (B 236) | 0 (W 210) | 4 | 66.5 | 69.5 | 2338 |
| 229 | (Oman) Aliyan Al Mashikhi Salim | 2021 | 0 (W 174) | 0 (B 180) | ½ (W 133) | 0 (B 46) | 0 (W 208) | 1 (B 234) | 0 (W 206) | 0 (B 210) | (-1) | 0 (B 193) | ½ (W 233) | 1 (B 238) | 0 (W 204) | 4 | 63 | 66.5 | 2293 |
| 230 | (Morocco) Anwoir Tarik | 2172 | 0 (B 88) | 0 (W 185) | 0 (B 127) | 1 (W 242) | 0 (B 108) | ½ (W 199) | 0 (B 190) | 0 (W 233) | 1 (B 244) | 0 (W 222) | 1 (B 234) | ½ (W 201) | 0 (B 209) | 4 | 63 | 66 | 2367 |
| 231 | (Thailand) Jonathan Bodemar | 2094 | 0 (B 134) | 0 (W 153) | 0 (B 188) | 0 (W 199) | 1 (B 233) | 0 (W 226) | 1 (B 240) | 0 (B 209) | 0 (W 167) | 1 (W 244) | 1 (B 228) | 0 (B 214) | 0 (W 208) | 4 | 59.5 | 62.5 | 2302 |
| 232 | (Vietnam) Nguyễn Ngọc Trường Sơn | 2550 | 0 (B 129) | 0 (W 216) | 0 (B 205) | 1 (W 243) | 1 (B 198) | ½ (W 188) | 0 (B 179) | 1 (B 221) | ½ (W 117) | (0) | (0) | (0) | (0) | 4 | 58.5 | 62.5 | 2319 |
| 233 | (Sweden) Victor Muntean | 2229 | 0 (W 80) | 0 (B 178) | 0 (W 132) | 0 (B 218) | 0 (W 231) | 1 (W 243) | ½ (B 245) | 1 (B 230) | 0 (W 204) | 0 (B 191) | ½ (B 229) | 1 (W 237) | 0 (B 201) | 4 | 57.5 | 60 | 2226 |
| 234 | (Nepal) Sushrut Dahal | 2019 | 0 (B 151) | 0 (W 154) | 0 (B 203) | 0 (W 198) | ½ (B 243) | 0 (W 229) | 0 (B 242) | (-1) | 1 (W 235) | 0 (B 221) | 0 (W 230) | 1 (W 241) | ½ (B 227) | 4 | 54 | 57 | 2186 |
| 235 | (Saudi Arabia) Emad Khayat | 1954 | 0 (W 247) | 0 (B 121) | 0 (W 209) | 0 (B 238) | (-1) | 0 (W 220) | 0 (B 223) | 0 (W 244) | 0 (B 234) | 1 (W 240) | ½ (B 241) | ½ (B 242) | 1 (W 243) | 4 | 51 | 54 | 2099 |
| 236 | (South Africa) James Dinham | 2091 | 0 (W 162) | 0 (B 122) | ½ (W 189) | 0 (B 149) | 1 (B 196) | 0 (W 184) | 0 (W 197) | ½ (B 243) | 1 (W 238) | 0 (B 209) | ½ (B 226) | 0 (W 228) | 0 (W 211) | 3.5 | 62 | 65 | 2379 |
| 237 | (Libya) Yousef Alhassadi | 2114 | 0 (B 156) | 0 (W 126) | 0 (B 108) | 0 (W 109) | 1 (B 242) | 0 (W 143) | 1 (B 244) | 0 (W 226) | 0 (B 199) | ½ (W 245) | ½ (B 239) | 0 (B 233) | ½ (W 238) | 3.5 | 60 | 62.5 | 2272 |
| 238 | (Libya) Omer Salah Fates | 2149 | 0 (B 32) | 0 (W 155) | 0 (B 143) | 1 (W 235) | 0 (B 186) | 0 (W 203) | 1 (B 239) | 0 (W 196) | 0 (B 236) | 0 (W 242) | 1 (B 244) | 0 (W 229) | ½ (B 237) | 3.5 | 59 | 62 | 2206 |
| 239 | (Qatar) Khaled Aljamaat | 1803 | 0 (W 25) | (-1) | 0 (B 98) | 0 (B 94) | 0 (W 217) | 0 (B 219) | 0 (W 238) | 0 (W 242) | ½ (B 240) | 1 (B 241) | ½ (W 237) | 0 (B 207) | ½ (W 244) | 3.5 | 57.5 | 60.5 | 2166 |
| 240 | (Qatar) Ibrahim Al-Janahi | 1722 | (-1) | 0 (B 68) | 0 (W 120) | 0 (B 180) | 0 (W 141) | 0 (B 195) | 0 (W 231) | 0 (B 241) | ½ (W 239) | 0 (B 235) | ½ (W 223) | ½ (W 244) | 1 (B 245) | 3.5 | 57.5 | 60 | 2142 |
| 241 | (Saudi Arabia) Abdulaziz Alkhuriji | 1892 | 0 (B 89) | 0 (W 159) | 0 (B 221) | 0 (W 220) | 0 (B 223) | 1 (W 242) | 0 (B 227) | 1 (W 240) | 0 (B 195) | 0 (W 239) | ½ (W 235) | 0 (B 234) | (-1) | 3.5 | 54.5 | 58 | 2115 |
| 242 | (Cayman Islands) Ryan Blackwood | 2019 | 0 (W 197) | 0 (B 183) | 0 (W 215) | 0 (B 230) | 0 (W 237) | 0 (B 241) | 1 (W 234) | 1 (B 239) | 0 (W 243) | 1 (B 238) | 0 (B 198) | ½ (W 235) | 0 (W 223) | 3.5 | 51.5 | 54.5 | 2171 |
| 243 | (Nepal) Aashish Phuyal | 2117 | 0 (W 115) | 0 (B 15) | 0 (W 169) | 0 (B 232) | ½ (W 234) | 0 (B 233) | (-1) | ½ (W 236) | 1 (B 242) | 0 (B 219) | 0 (W 206) | 0 (B 208) | 0 (B 235) | 3 | 60.5 | 63.5 | 2257 |
| 244 | (Qatar) Hamad Al-Kuwari | 1777 | 0 (B 128) | 0 (W 173) | 0 (B 226) | (-1) | 0 (W 221) | 0 (B 228) | 0 (W 237) | 1 (B 235) | 0 (W 230) | 0 (B 231) | 0 (W 238) | ½ (B 240) | ½ (B 239) | 3 | 50.5 | 53.5 | 2153 |
| 245 | (Kuwait) Meshal Alsaqer | 1918 | 0 (W 43) | 0 (B 200) | (-1) | 0 (B 122) | 0 (W 202) | 0 (B 215) | ½ (W 233) | ½ (W 199) | 0 (B 198) | ½ (B 237) | 0 (W 227) | 0 (B 223) | 0 (W 240) | 2.5 | 59.5 | 62 | 2261 |
| 246 | (Georgia (country)) Baadur Jobava | 2645 | 1 (B 155) | ½ (W 134) | ½ (B 151) | ½ (W 70) | 0 (B 60) | 0 (W 127) | (0) | (0) | (0) | (0) | (0) | (0) | (0) | 2.5 | 55 | 57.5 | 2498 |
| 247 | (United States) Brandon Jacobson | 2507 | 1 (B 235) | 0 (W 38) | ½ (B 129) | 0 (W 91) | B- (69) | (0) | (0) | (0) | (0) | (0) | (0) | (0) | (0) | 1.5 | 37.5 | 39 | 2264 |
