= Asian Rapid and Blitz Chess Championships =

Chess tournament

The Asian Rapid and Blitz Chess Championships are chess tournaments played in rapid and blitz time controls respectively. This tournament is open to all players from Asian chess federations (FIDE zones from 3.1 to 3.8) approved by their respective national federation. It is held with the Swiss system and consists of two divisions, Open and Women's, the latter of which is reserved to female players. Both sections determine the Asian Rapid and Blitz champions. The Championship is regulated by the Asian Chess Federation.

== Format ==
For Asian Rapid Chess Championship and Asian Women's Rapid Chess Championship 11 rounds of rapid games are played with time control of 15 minutes each player with 10 seconds of increment each move each player starting from the first move, whereas for Asian Blitz Chess Championship and Asian Women's Blitz Chess Championship 13 round of blitz games are played with time control of 3 minutes each player with 2 seconds of increment each move each player starting from the first move. Players are paired based on swiss system with each decisive game awarding 1 point to the winner and 0 to the loser and each drawn game providing half a point to both players. In case of tie, the following tie-breakers shall be used in this order-

1. Direct encounter (only if all tied players have played each other)
2. Number of wins (including forfeits)
3. Buchholz Cut 1
4. Tournament Performance Rating
5. Drawing of lots, 2 blitz games or other methods decided by arbiter

== 2026 Championships ==
The inaugural Asian Rapid and Blitz Chess Championships were organised from July 27 to July 31, 2026 at TungPo Kitty Woo Stadium in Wong Tai Sin, Hong Kong by Hong Kong China Chess Federation and Asian Chess Federation.

In Open category, GM Aleksey Grebnev won the rapid title and GM Lê Tuấn Minh won the blitz title, whereas in Women's category, GM Harika Dronavalli won both rapid and blitz title.

=== Prizes ===
Position (after tiebreaks)	Trophy/Medal	Cash Prizes (in HKD) (if any)			
Position (after tiebreaks)	Trophy/Medal	Rapid		Blitz	
Position (after tiebreaks)	Trophy/Medal	Open	Women	Open	Women
1st	Trophy + Gold Medal	40,000	20,000	26,000	13,000
2nd	Trophy + Silver Medal	20,000	10,000	13,000	6,500
3rd	Trophy + Bronze Medal	10,000	5,000	6,500	3,500
4th	Medals	8,000	4,000	5,500	3,500
5th	Medals	6,000	3,000	4,000	2,000
6th	Medals	5,000	2,000	3,500	1,500
7th	Medals	4,000	2,000	3,000	1,200
8th	Medals	3,000	2,000	2,000	1,200
9th	Medals	2,000	1,000	1,500	800
10th	Medals	2,000	1,000	1,500	800
Best rank representing HKCCF	Medals	No cash prizes			
Best Player rated under 2200	Medals	No cash prizes			
Best Player rated under 2000	Medals	No cash prizes			
Best Player rated under 1800	Medals	No cash prizes			
Best Player rated under 1600	Medals	No cash prizes			
Total Prize Pool		100,000	50,000	66,500	34,000

=== Asian Rapid Chess Championship 2026 ===
Top 10 results
Rank	Player	Points	TB1	TB2	TB3
1	Aleksey Grebnev (FIDE)	8.5	-	7	77.5
2	Goutham Krishna H (India)	8.5	-	7	75.5
3	Ilia Iljiushenok (FIDE)	8.5	-	6	74.5
4	Dinh Nho Kiet (Vietnam)	8	-	8	69
5	Pavel Ponkratov (FIDE)	8	-	7	74
6	Bai Jinshi (China)	8	-	7	72.5
7	Wang Hao (China)	8	-	7	72
8	Wang Yu (China)	8	-	7	70.5
9	Hoang Son Dang (Vietnam)	8	-	7	70
10	Rudik Makarian (FIDE)	8	-	6	75

=== Asian Women's Rapid Chess Championship 2026 ===
Rank	Player	Points	TB1	TB2	TB3
1	Harika Dronavalli (India)	8.5	1	6	73
2	Anna Shukhman (FIDE)	8.5	2	8	71.5
3	Phạm Lê Thảo Nguyên (Vietnam)	8	1	7	73.5
4	Valentina Gunina (FIDE)	8	2	6	72.5
5	Umida Omonova (Uzbekistan)	7.5	-	6	73.5
6	Xeniya Balabayeva (Kazakhstan)	7.5	-	6	68.5
7	Olga Girya (FIDE)	7	-	6	70
8	Mariya Kholyavko (Kazakhstan)	7	-	6	68
9	Nguyễn Thị Thanh An (Vietnam)	7	-	6	67
10	Ngoc Thuy Duong Bach (Vietnam)	7	-	5	68

=== Asian Blitz Chess Championship 2026 ===
To be continued - please contribute creating the remaining page

Rank	Player	Points	TB1	TB2	TB3
1	Lê Tuấn Minh (Vietnam)				
2	Goutham Krishna H (India)				
3	Jiang Haochen (China)				
4	Wang Hao (China)				
5	Aleksandr Rakhmanov (FIDE)				
6	Aleksey Grebnev (FIDE)				
7	Pavel Ponkratov (FIDE)				
8	Prraneeth Vuppala (India)				
9	Dau Khuong Duy (Vietnam)				
10	Bai Jinshi (China)				

To be continued - please contribute creating the page
