= Aleksey Grebnev =

Russian chess grandmaster (born 2006)

Personal information
- Born: Aleksey Nikolaevich Grebnev; 26 July 2006 (age 20) Tolyatti, Russia

Chess career
- Country: Russia (until 2022); FIDE (since 2022)
- Title: Grandmaster (2024)
- FIDE rating: 2614 (August 2026)
- Peak rating: 2632 (December 2025)
- Peak ranking: No. 94 (December 2025)

Aleksey Nikolaevich Grebnev (born 26 July 2006) is a Russian chess grandmaster.

== Chess career ==
Grebnev started playing chess at the age of 6, and is coached by Dmitry Afanasiev and Maxim Matlakov.

In September 2023, he won the Open section of the Tata Steel Asian Junior Championship, defeating Alekhya Mukhopadhyay in the final round to finish with a score of 7/9.

In November 2023, he became the U18 World Youth Champion with one round to spare after defeating Prraneeth Vuppala in the penultimate round.

In October 2024, he won the Open section of the Asian Junior Championship after grabbing the lead in Round 3 and maintaining it to the end.

In June 2025, he won the Dubai Open with 7/9, after having better tiebreaks than Alan Pichot. In July 2025, he won the Oskemen Open with 7/9, after having better tiebreaks than Richard Rapport.

In October 2025, he defeated Marc'Andria Maurizzi in their FIDE World Cup 2025 qualification match. At the World Cup, he made it to the fifth round after defeating Daniel Quizon, David Navara, Stamatis Kourkoulos-Arditis, and Maxime Vachier-Lagrave in the first four rounds. He was knocked out by compatriot Andrey Esipenko in the fifth round.

In July 2026, he won the Asian Rapid Continental Championship with 8½/11, after having better tiebreaks than IM Goutham Krishna H and Ilia Iljiushenok.
