= Đầu Khương Duy =

Vietnamese chess player (born 2011)

Personal information
- Born: July 20, 2011 (age 15) Thái Nguyên, Vietnam

Chess career
- Country: Vietnam
- Title: International Master (2024)
- FIDE rating: 2509 (September 2026)
- Peak rating: 2528 (July 2026)

Đầu Khương Duy is a Vietnamese chess player.

== Chess career ==
He began playing chess at the age of 7, and won the bronze medal in the U8 section of the World Youth Chess Championship just one year later.

In October 2022, he achieved the International Master title after scoring 6/8 in the Bangkok Open, becoming the youngest Vietnamese player to earn the IM title. He drew against grandmasters Novendra Priasmoro, David Smerdon, and Gerhard Schebler and defeated higher-rated IMs Junta Ikeda and Ricardo de Guzman.

In 2023, he won the U12 section of the World Youth Chess Championship.

In December 2025 at the World Blitz Chess Championship, he defeated eight grandmasters (Denis Lazavik, Shamsiddin Vokhidov, Pablo Salinas Herrera, Pouya Idani, Jakub Kosakowski, José Martínez Alcántara, Cristobal Henriquez Villagra, Giga Quparadze, and Mahammad Muradli), finishing with a score of 11/19.
