= Arystan Isanzhulov =

Kazakhstani chess player (born 2003)

Personal information
- Born: June 19, 2003 (age 23)

Chess career
- Country: Kazakhstan
- Title: International Master (2023)
- Peak rating: 2445 (September 2023)

Arystan İsanjūlov (Note: Often transliterated as Arystan Isanzhulov through a Russified Romanization of Арыстан Исанжулов.) (Kazakh: Арыстан Исанжұлов; born June 19, 2003) is a Kazakhstani chess player.

== Chess career ==
In June 2023, he won the Asian Continental Blitz Open tournament (which was part of the 2023 FIDE Circuit) ahead of grandmasters Pranav V and Denis Makhnev on tiebreak scores.

In October 2023, he won the bronze medal in the World Junior Blitz Championship, behind winner Mahammad Muradli and runner-up Raunak Sadhwani.

In December 2024, he finished in 14th place out of over 265 players at the Sunway Sitges Chess Festival.
