= Mahdi Gholami Orimi =

Iranian chess grandmaster (born 2002)

Personal information
- Born: April 29, 2002 (age 24) Mazandaran, Iran

Chess career
- Country: Iran
- Title: Grandmaster (2024)
- FIDE rating: 2553 (September 2026)
- Peak rating: 2558 (October 2026)

Mahdi Gholami Orimi is an Iranian chess grandmaster.

== Chess career ==
In September 2024, he won the Splimbergo Masters ahead of Marcin Tazbir and Kaustuv Kundu due to having the best tiebreak scores.

He was awarded the Grandmaster title in 2024, after achieving his norms at the:

- Ellobregat Open Chess Tournament in December 2023
- Caissa Hotel Chess Tournament in April 2024
- Sharjah Masters in May 2024

In November 2025, he tied with Brandon Jacobson for first place at the Annemasse Festival Masters, ultimately being ranked as the runner-up after tiebreak scores.
