= José Carlos Ibarra Jeréz =

Spanish chess grandmaster (born 1985)

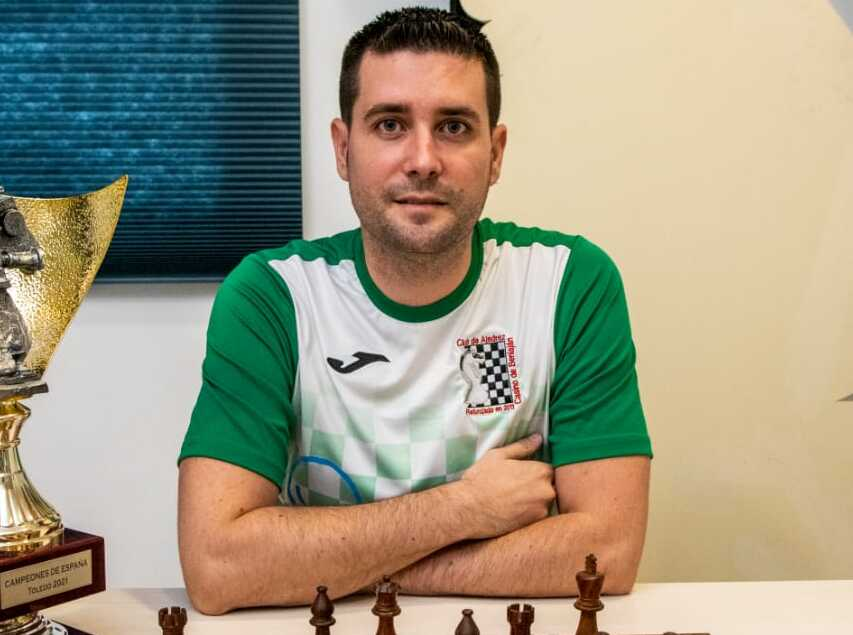
- Ibarra Jeréz in 2022

Personal information
- Born: August 7, 1985 (age 40) Totana, Spain

Chess career
- Country: Spain
- Title: Grandmaster (2013)
- FIDE rating: 2533 (July 2026)
- Peak rating: 2577 (December 2017)

José Carlos Ibarra Jeréz is a Spanish chess grandmaster.

== Chess career ==
In January 2013, he finished second in the Roquetas del Mar 2013, losing the championship to James Plaskett. However, he was the only player in the tournament to have defeated Plaskett in a game.

In February 2015, he tied for first place in the Titled Tuesday tournament with Baadur Jobava and Eltaj Safarli, with the three ultimately sharing the win and prize.

In September 2017, he won his fifth Titled Tuesday tournament on chess.com alongside Grigoriy Oparin.

In December 2023, he served as a commentator for the El Llobregat Open Chess Tournament alongside Tilsia Varela.
