= Artur Davtyan (chess player) =

Armenian chess grandmaster (born 2002)

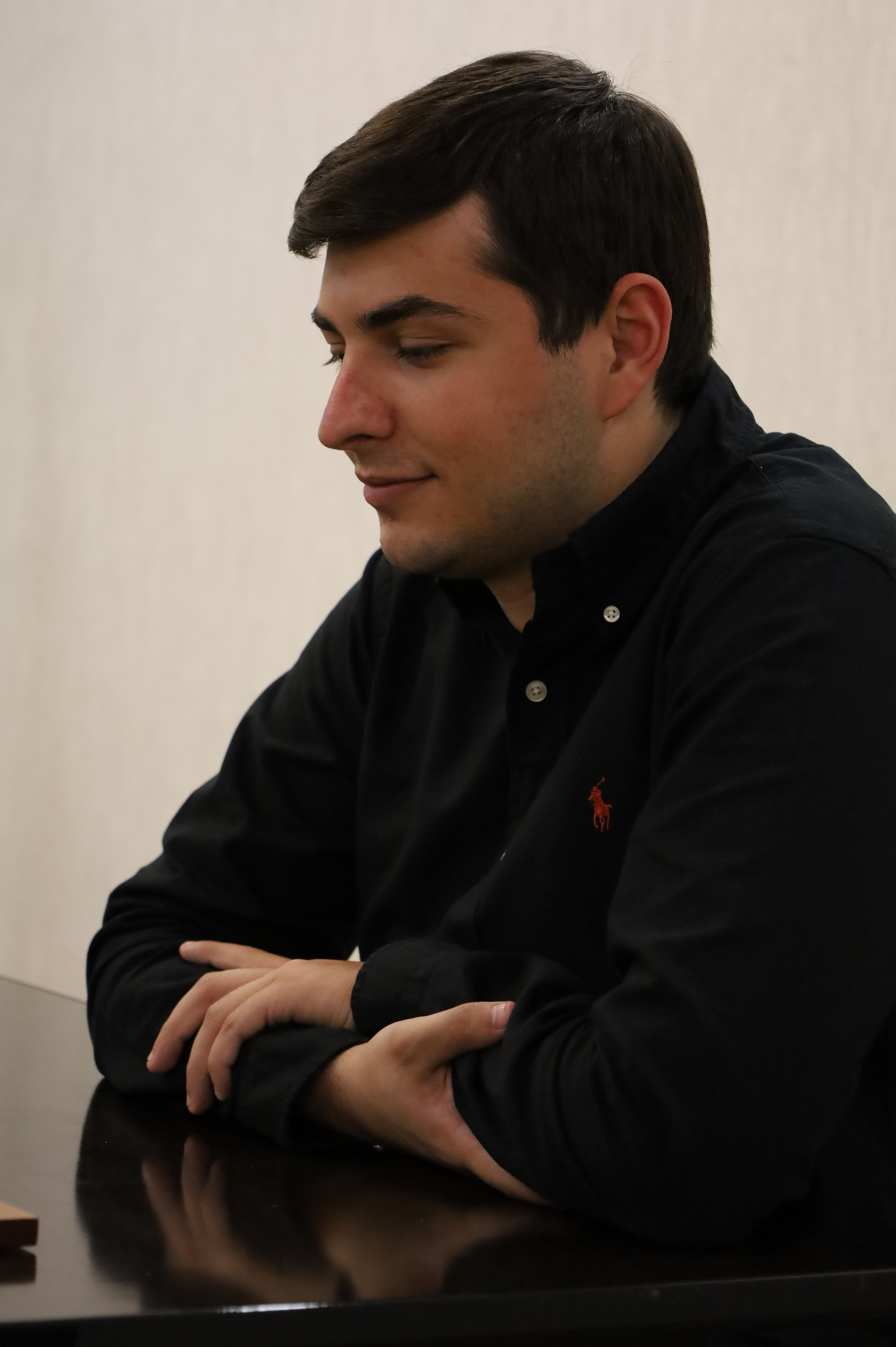

Personal information
- Born: August 27, 2002 (age 23) Yerevan, Armenia

Chess career
- Country: Armenia
- Title: Grandmaster (2026)
- FIDE rating: 2508 (July 2026)
- Peak rating: 2520 (July 2022)

Artur Davtyan is an Armenian chess grandmaster.

== Chess career ==
In December 2025, he won the GM Putnik 95 tournament held in Serbia, earning his final GM norm and qualifying for the title.

In January 2026, he finished in second place in the Armenian Chess Championship, prevailing over Zaven Andriasian on tiebreak score.

He was awarded the Grandmaster title in 2026, after achieving his norms at the:

- European Individual Chess Championship in June 2017
- Sharjah Masters in May 2022
- GM Putnik 95 in December 2025
