= Denis Makhnev =

Kazakhstani chess grandmaster (born 2000)

Personal information
- Born: February 20, 2000 (age 26) Pavlodar, Pavlodar Region, Kazakhstan

Chess career
- Country: Kazakhstan
- Title: Grandmaster (2021)
- FIDE rating: 2568 (September 2026)
- Peak rating: 2581 (October 2026)

Denis Maksimovich Makhnev (Russian: Денис Максимович Махнев; born 20 February 2000) is a Kazakhstani chess grandmaster.

== Chess career ==
In April 2024, he finished in third place behind winner Vitaliy Bernadskiy and runner-up Mitrabha Guha in the 21st BCC Open after having a better tiebreak score than Srihari L. R., Sayantan Das, and James Morris on tiebreaks.

In November 2024, he won the Kazakhstan Chess Cup, finishing ahead of Ramazan Zhalmakhanov and Mihail Nikitenko.
