= Erdem Khubukshanov =

Russian chess grandmaster (born 2007)

Personal information
- Born: January 25, 2007 (age 19) Ulan-Ude, Russia

Chess career
- Country: Russia (until 2024); FIDE (since 2024)
- Title: Grandmaster (2026)
- FIDE rating: 2513 (November 2026)
- Peak rating: 2523 (July 2026)

Erdem Alekseevich Khubukshanov is a Russian chess grandmaster.

== Chess career ==
In January 2025, he won the U19 section of the Russian Youth Blitz Championship.

In March 2025, he won the Russian Junior Chess Championship with a score of 6.5/9, half a point ahead of runner-up Konstantin Popov.

He was awarded the Grandmaster title in 2026, after achieving his norms at the:

- Chelyabinsk variant A in April 2022
- Aeroflot Open in March 2024
- Team Men PL Chess Final in May 2024
