= Mitrabha Guha =

Indian chess grandmaster (born 2001)

Personal information
- Born: 15 September 2001 (age 24) Kolkata, India

Chess career
- Country: India
- Title: Grandmaster (2022)
- FIDE rating: 2525 (July 2026)
- Peak rating: 2545 (July 2024)

Mitrabha Guha is an Indian chess grandmaster.

== Career ==
In September 2023, he won the Tata Steel Chess Festival 2023 Blitz Open ahead of Diptayan Ghosh, Soham Bhattacharyya, and Alekhya Mukhopadhyay with an unbeaten score of 7.5/8. This was his fourth tournament win of the year, and was the second time he won the Blitz Open event.

He had also won the gold medal in the 2023-2024 Commonwealth Chess Championship by defeating IM Rohith Krishna S in the final round.

In January 2024, he won the Bangalore GM Blitz Open and the Bangalore GM Open with a score of 8/10, remaining undefeated in the latter event. He defeated Shyam Sundar M. in the last round to surpass S. P. Sethuraman. This win was his third consecutive victorious event of the year.
