= Bai Jinshi =

Chinese chess grandmaster (born 1999)

- Bai in 2026

Personal information
- Born: 18 May 1999 (age 27) Changchun, Jilin, China

Chess career
- Country: China
- Title: Grandmaster (2015)
- FIDE rating: 2600 (September 2026)
- Peak rating: 2618 (January 2020)

Bai Jinshi (Chinese: 白金石; pinyin: Bái Jīnshí; born 18 May 1999) is a Chinese chess grandmaster.

== Career ==
Born in Jilin, Bai won the Under 10 section of the World Youth Chess Championships in 2009. He played for China A team in the World Youth U16 Chess Olympiad in 2013. Bai won the London Chess Classic Open (jointly with Kamil Dragun) in 2014, the Cannes Open and the Groningen Chess Festival (on tiebreak from Sergei Tiviakov) in 2016. In April 2018, he finished tied for first place with Wen Yang in the Chinese Chess Championship and ended in second place on tiebreak score. In December, he won the North American Open in Las Vegas, US. In the same year, Bai played for the Chinese team in the China-Russia match, the Asian Nations Cup, where China won the bronze medal, and the India-China Summit match. In March 2019, Bai won the Spring Chess Classic B tournament in St Louis, US.

He played the Chess World Cup 2025, winning the first round 1.5-0.5 to Adham Fawzy and losing the second round 2-4 to Daniil Dubov, who went on to beat R Praggnanandhaa in round 4 2.5-1.5, the 7th highest rated player at the time, before losing to Sam Shankland 1-3 in the round of 16.
