= Giga Quparadze =

Georgian chess grandmaster (born 1987)

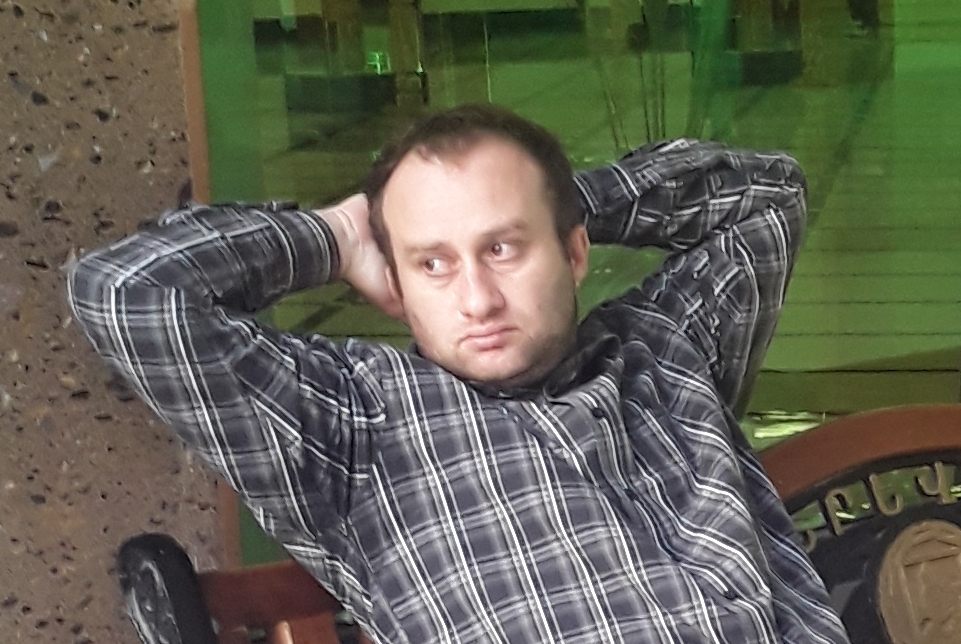
- Quparadze in 2023

Personal information
- Born: August 23, 1987 (age 38) Kutaisi, Georgia

Chess career
- Country: Georgia
- Title: Grandmaster (2017)
- FIDE rating: 2491 (July 2026)
- Peak rating: 2543 (March 2025)

Giga Quparadze (Georgian: გიგა ყუფარაძე) is a Georgian chess grandmaster.

== Chess career ==
In February 2017, Quparadze earned his final GM norm at the 7th International Ferdowsi Cup Chess Tournament held in Iran. In 2019, he won the Georgian Chess Championship.

In January 2021, Quparadze won a Titled Tuesday tournament hosted by Chess.com, finishing with a score of 10/11 ahead of Hikaru Nakamura and Jeffery Xiong.

In December 2022, he participated in the World Rapid and Blitz Chess Championships. He finished in 55th and 51st places, respectively, in fields of 176 players.

In June 2023, one of his students, Anastasia Kirtadze, won the FIDE World Under-14 Championship.

In February 2025, he finished second in the Georgian Chess Championship, scoring a half-point behind champion Levan Pantsulaia.
