= Jakub Kosakowski =

Polish chess grandmaster (born 2002)

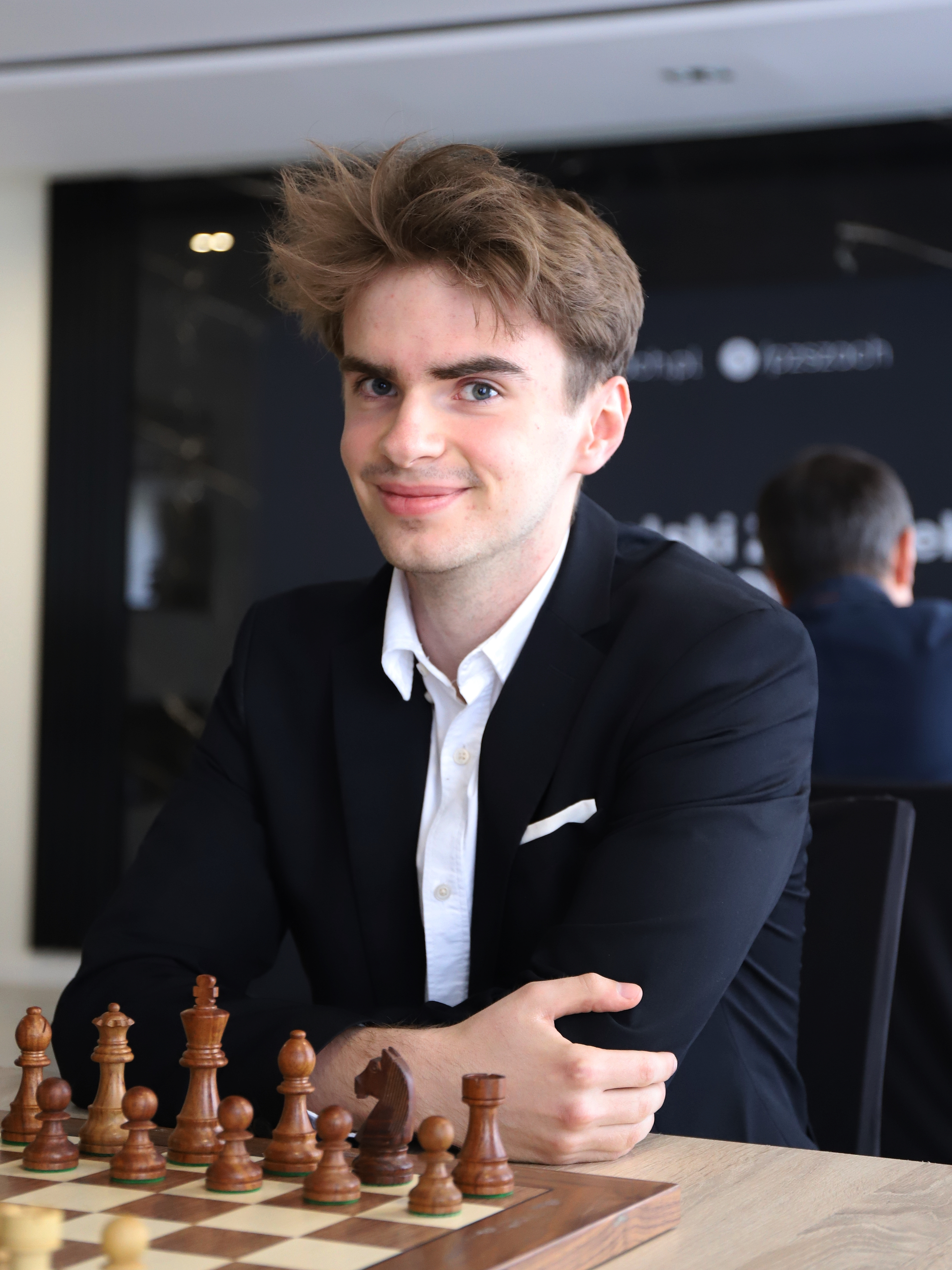
- Jakub Kosakowski in 2022

Personal information
- Born: 7 January 2002 (age 24)

Chess career
- Country: Poland
- Title: Grandmaster (2025)
- FIDE rating: 2520 (September 2026)
- Peak rating: 2551 (July 2025)

Jakub Kosakowski (born 7 January 2002) is a Polish chess grandmaster (2025).

== Chess career ==
Jakub Kosakowski has won medals at the Polish Youth Chess Championships five times: gold in Poronin in 2012 (U10 age group), gold in Suwałki in 2015 (U14 age group), silver in Ustroń in 2017 (U16 age group), gold in Jastrzębia Góra in 2018 (U16 age group), and silver in Szklarska Poręba in 2020 ([U18 age group).

Jakub Kosakowski has won eight medals at the Polish Youth Rapid Chess Championships, including six gold medals: Warsaw in 2011 (U10 age group), Olszytyn in 2013 (U12 age group), Wrocław in 2014 (U12 age group), Koszalin in 2016 (U14 age grou), Wrocław in 2017 - (U16 age group), and Wrocław in 2018 (U16 age group). He has also won five medals at the Polish Youth Blitz Chess Championships, including two gold medals: Wrocław in 2014 (U12 age group), and Koszalin in 2016 (U14 age group). He represented Poland at World Youth Chess Championships (2 times) and European Youth Chess Championships (2 times), achieving his best result in 2015 in Poreč (13th place at the European Youth Chess Championship in the U14 age group).

In 2022, Kosakowski won the silver medal at the Polish Blitz Chess Championship. In May 2024, he ranked 8th at the Polish Chess Championship.

Jakub Kosakowski has been among the winners in the following tournaments:

- 2010 – 1st place in Białystok (Ludwik Zamenhof Memorial, open D);
- 2015 – 2nd place in Jastrzębia Góra Gwiazda Północy (Star of the North);
- 2017 – 3rd place in Jastrzębia Góra Gwiazda Północy (Star of the North);
- 2020 – 2nd place in Łazy (Perła Bałtyku, open A);
- 2021 – 2nd place in Polanica-Zdrój (Akiba Rubinstein Memorial, open).
