= Goutham Krishna H =

Indian chess player (born 2010)

Personal information
- Born: July 5, 2010 (age 16) Ernakulam, India

Chess career
- Country: India
- Title: International Master (2024)
- FIDE rating: 2457 (October 2026)
- Peak rating: 2466 (September 2024)

Goutham Krishna H is an Indian chess player.

== Chess career ==
In May 2022, he won the National Under-12 Open Chess Championship with sole lead. He scored 9.5 points out of 11 rounds, half a point ahead of 2nd and 3rd place.

In October 2025, he tied for first place with P. Iniyan in the Indian Chess Championship, losing the title on tiebreaks. Later that month, he won the 2nd DevA Rapid Rating Open with a perfect score of 9/9.

In November 2025, he tied for first place with Rosh Jain in the National Sub-Junior Under-15 Open with a score of 9.5/11. He became the champion on tiebreaks.

In December 2025, he achieved notable performances at the World Rapid Chess Championship 2025, defeating grandmasters Aravindh Chithambaram and Teimour Radjabov and drawing against grandmasters Alexander Grischuk and Anish Giri.

In May 2026, he won the Commonwealth Under-16 Youth Championship with 8/9 held in Kalutara, Sri Lanka.

In July 2026, he won double silver at the Asian Rapid and Blitz Championships held in Hong Kong, China. He narrowly missed out on gold in both the events on tiebreaks.
