= Prraneeth Vuppala =

Indian chess grandmaster (born 2007)

Personal information
- Born: 2 January 2007 (age 19) Alagadapa, Nalgonda district, Telangana, India

Chess career
- Country: India
- Title: Grandmaster (2023)
- FIDE rating: 2472 (November 2026)
- Peak rating: 2523 (April 2026)

Prraneeth Vuppala (born 2 January 2007) is an Indian chess player.

== Early life and background ==
He was born in the Alagadapa village in Nalgonda district of Telangana. He studied at the David Memorial High School.

== Career ==
In 2018, he achieved the world no. 1 ranking in the under-11 category.

In March 2022, he earned the International Master title by drawing the game with Rathanvel V S at the First Saturday tournament in Budapest. He also earned his first grandmaster norm at the same event.

In 2023, he achieved his final grandmaster norm, and became the 82nd grandmaster from India.

He used to train under Rama Raju between 2015 and 2021. Now he is coached by Israeli grandmaster Victor Mikhalevski.
