= Chess World Cup 2025 =

Chess tournament in Goa, India

FIDE Chess World Cup 2025
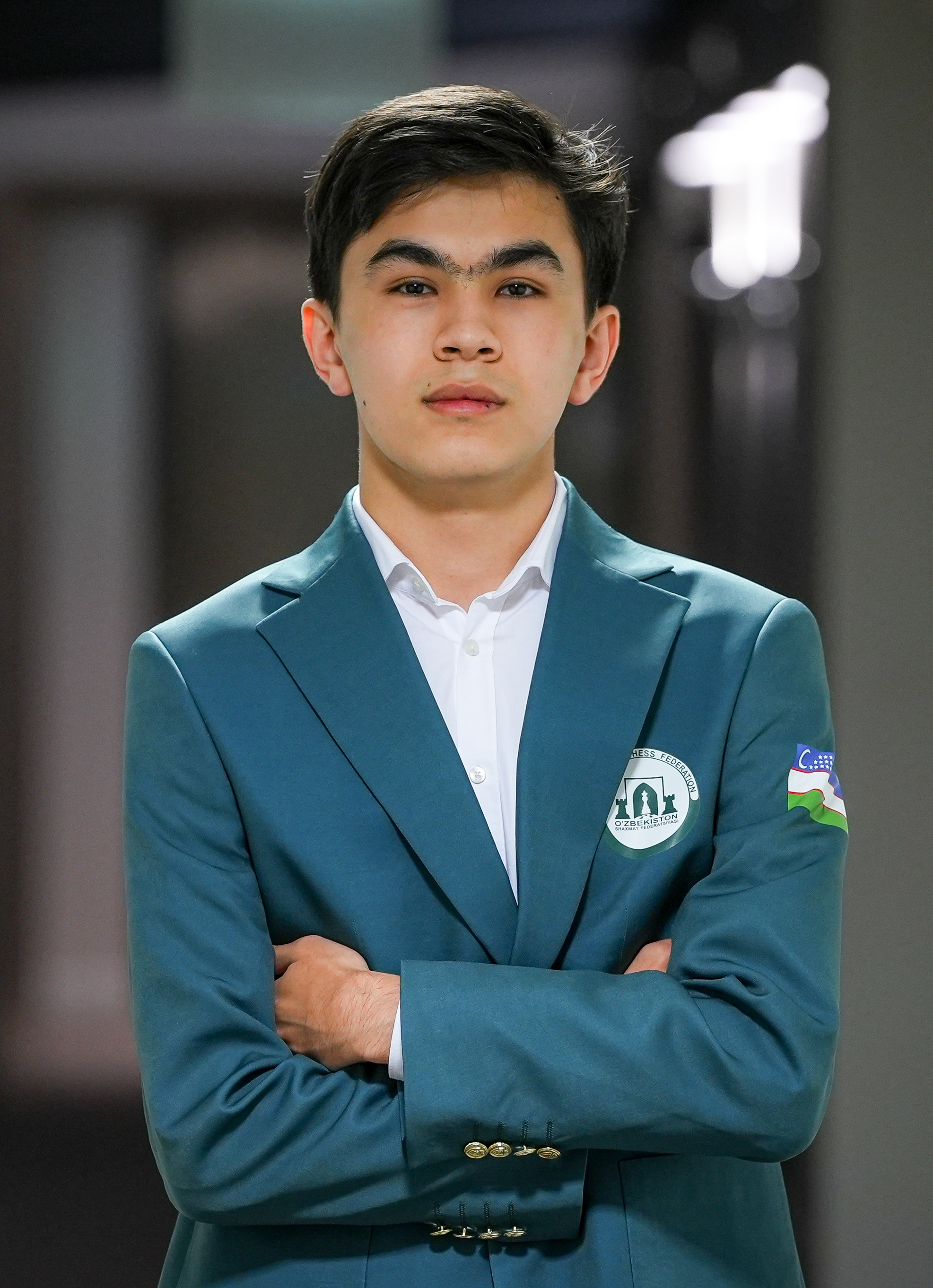
- Javokhir Sindarov, winner of the 2025 FIDE World Cup

Tournament information
- Sport: Chess
- Location: Goa, India
- Dates: 31 October 2025–27 November 2025
- Administrator: FIDE
- Tournament format: Single-elimination tournament
- Host: All India Chess Federation
- Participants: 206

Final positions
- Champion: (Uzbekistan) Javokhir Sindarov
- Runner-up: (China) Wei Yi
- 3rd place: (FIDE) Andrey Esipenko

The Chess World Cup 2025 was a 206-player single-elimination chess tournament that took place in Goa, India, from 31 October to 27 November 2025. It was the 11th edition of the Chess World Cup. Javokhir Sindarov won the tournament, becoming at age 19, the youngest World Cup winner to date. The winner, runner-up, and third-place finisher (Sindarov, Wei Yi and Andrey Esipenko) earned the right to play in the Candidates Tournament 2026.

== Format ==
The tournament is an eight-round knockout event, with the top 50 seeds given a bye into the second round. The losers of the two semi-finals play a match for third place. The players who finish first, second, and third qualify for the Candidates Tournament 2026, a tournament to decide the challenger for the World Chess Championship 2026.

Each round consists of classical time limit games on the first two days, plus tie-breaks on the third day if they are required. The time limits are as follows:

- The two classical games have a time limit of 90 minutes each side for the first 40 moves, then 30 extra minutes for the rest of the game, + 30 seconds increment per move starting from move 1.
- If the match is tied 1–1 after the two classical games, two rapid games are played with 15 minutes + 10 seconds increment.
- If the match is tied 2–2, two rapid games of 10 minutes + 10 seconds increment are played.
- If the match is tied 3–3, two blitz games of 5 minutes + 3 seconds increment are played.
- If the match is tied 4–4, two blitz games of 3 minutes + 2 seconds increment are played.
- If the match is tied 5–5, a single sudden death armageddon game is played. White has 4 minutes + 2 seconds increment. Each player bids for Black's starting time + 2 seconds increment, and the player who submits the lowest time wins the bid and plays with Black. If both players make the same bid, a drawing of lots shall determine the colours. If the armageddon game results in a draw, Black wins the match.

=== Schedule ===
Each round lasts three days: two for classical time control games and a third, if necessary, for tie-breaks. Rounds 1 to 3 run from 1 to 9 November; 10 November is a rest day; Rounds 4 to 6 run from 11 to 19 November; 20 November is a rest day; Rounds 7 (semi-final) and 8 (final and 3rd/4th play off) run from 21 to 26 November.

=== Prize money ===
The total prize fund is US$2,000,000, with the first prize of US$120,000.

Prize money in US dollars
Ranking	Prizes	Total
Eliminated in Round 1	78 × 3,500	273,000
Eliminated in Round 2	64 × 7,000	448,000
Eliminated in Round 3	32 × 11,000	352,000
Eliminated in Round 4	16 × 17,000	272,000
Eliminated in Round 5	8 × 25,000	200,000
Eliminated in Round 6	4 × 35,000	140,000
4th place	1 × 50,000	50,000
3rd place	1 × 60,000	60,000
Runner-up	1 × 85,000	85,000
Winner	1 × 120,000	120,000
Total		2,000,000

=== Qualification ===
The following players qualified for the World Cup:

- The world chess champion as of 1 June 2025
- The women's world chess champion as of 1 June 2025 (WWC)
- The top four players in the Chess World Cup 2023 (WC)
- The 2024 World Junior Champion U20 (U20)
- 100 players qualifying from Continental and Zonal events:
  - Europe (30+11) including European Championships 2024 (E24, 20) and 2025 (E25, 20), and Zonal 1.10 (Z1.10, 1)
  - Americas (12+9) including American Continental Championships 2024 (AM24, 4) and 2025 (AM25, 4), and Zonals 2.1 (Z2.1, 5), 2.2 (Z2.2, 1), 2.3.1 (Z2.3.1, 1), 2.3.2 (Z2.3.2, 1), 2.3.3 (Z2.3.3, 1), 2.4 (Z2.4, 2), and 2.5 (Z2.5, 2)
  - Asia (35) including Asian Championships 2025 (AS25, 10), and Zonals 3.1 (Z3.1, 2), 3.2 (Z3.2, 1), 3.3 (Z3.3, 2), 3.4 (Z3.4, 4), 3.5 (Z3.5, 3), 3.6 (Z3.6, 1), 3.7 (Z3.7, 7), and 3.8 (Z3.8, 5)
  - Africa (3) including African Championships 2024 (AF24, 1) and 2025 (AF25, 2)
- The 13 highest rated players from the June 2025 FIDE World Rankings (Note: Players who appear inactive at least once in the 6 FIDE rating lists from January to June 2025 are not eligible.) (R)
- 80 federation spots selected according to the final standings of the 45th Chess Olympiad (FN)
- 4 nominees of the FIDE president (PN)
- 2 nominees of the organiser (ON)

Afghanistan and Chinese Taipei did not nominate a player, and two additional Presidential Nominees were invited instead. Pakistan had nominated a player but declined to participate later, Leon Luke Mendonca, a reserved Presidential Nominee was invited to the tournament instead.

== Participants ==
The participants are seeded by their FIDE rating of October 2025, except for Gukesh Dommaraju, who is seeded first as the reigning World Chess Champion. Grandmaster Divya Deshmukh was the only woman; the remaining 205 participants were all male.

The table is collapsed by default and can be sorted on any column. Click on the section number of a player to go to their draw section. Rating is the October 2025 standard FIDE rating.

Participants List
Seed	Section	Name	Federation	Title	Rating	Born	Qualification	FIDE Profile
1	1	Gukesh D	India	GM	2752	2006	World Champion	46616543
2	16	Erigaisi Arjun	India	GM	2773	2003	R	35009192
3	9	Praggnanandhaa R	India	GM	2771	2005	WC	25059530
4	8	Giri, Anish	Netherlands	GM	2759	1994	R	24116068
5	5	So, Wesley	United States	GM	2756	1993	R	5202213
6	12	Keymer, Vincent	Germany	GM	2755	2004	R	12940690
7	13	Wei, Yi	China	GM	2754	1999	R	8603405
8	4	Abdusattorov, Nodirbek	Uzbekistan	GM	2750	2004	R	14204118
9	3	Mamedyarov, Shakhriyar	Azerbaijan	GM	2742	1985	R	13401319
10	14	Niemann, Hans Moke	United States	GM	2738	2003	Z2.1	2093596
11	11	Vachier-Lagrave, Maxime	France	GM	2737	1990	R	623539
12	6	Nepomniachtchi, Ian	FIDE	GM	2732	1990	R	4168119
13	7	Le, Quang Liem	Vietnam	GM	2729	1991	R	12401137
14	10	Rapport, Richard	Hungary	GM	2724	1996	R	738590
15	15	Aronian, Levon	United States	GM	2722	1982	Z2.1	13300474
16	2	Sindarov, Javokhir	Uzbekistan	GM	2721	2005	R	14205483
17	2	Yu, Yangyi	China	GM	2720	1994	R	8603820
18	15	Fedoseev, Vladimir	Slovenia	GM	2720	1995	E24	24130737
19	10	Vidit, Santosh Gujrathi	India	GM	2716	1994	R	5029465
20	7	Aravindh, Chithambaram VR.	India	GM	2711	1999	R	5072786
21	6	Liang, Awonder	United States	GM	2710	2003	Z2.1	2056437
22	11	Nihal Sarin	India	GM	2700	2004	R	25092340
23	14	Sevian, Samuel	United States	GM	2698	2000	Z2.1	2040506
24	3	Harikrishna, Pentala	India	GM	2697	1986	FN	5007003
25	4	Van Foreest, Jorden	Netherlands	GM	2697	1999	E25	1039784
26	13	Maghsoodloo, Parham	Iran	GM	2697	2000	FN	12539929
27	12	Esipenko, Andrey	FIDE	GM	2693	2002	Z3.8	24175439
28	5	Yakubboev, Nodirbek	Uzbekistan	GM	2689	2002	FN	14203987
29	8	Bluebaum, Matthias	Germany	GM	2687	1997	E25	24651516
30	9	Dubov, Daniil	FIDE	GM	2684	1996	Z3.8	24126055
31	16	Alekseenko, Kirill	Austria	GM	2679	1997	PN	4135539
32	1	Bu, Xiangzhi	China	GM	2672	1985	FN	8601445
33	1	Sargsyan, Shant	Armenia	GM	2667	2002	E25	13306766
34	16	Leko, Peter	Hungary	GM	2666	1979	FN	703303
35	9	Murzin, Volodar	FIDE	GM	2664	2006	PN	44155573
36	8	Robson, Ray	United States	GM	2664	1994	Z2.1	2023970
37	5	Nguyen, Thai Dai Van	Czechia	GM	2664	2001	FN	358878
38	12	Karthikeyan, Murali	India	GM	2662	1999	AS25	5074452
39	13	Saric, Ivan	Croatia	GM	2661	1990	E25	14508150
40	4	Sarana, Alexey	Serbia	GM	2661	2000	FN	24133795
41	3	Oparin, Grigoriy	United States	GM	2661	1997	FN	24125890
42	14	Christiansen, Johan-Sebastian	Norway	GM	2661	1998	FN	1512668
43	11	Navara, David	Czechia	GM	2656	1985	E25	309095
44	6	Mamedov, Rauf	Azerbaijan	GM	2655	1988	E24	13401653
45	7	Deac, Bogdan-Daniel	Romania	GM	2655	2001	E24	1226380
46	10	Shankland, Sam	United States	GM	2654	1991	AM25	2004887
47	15	Wojtaszek, Radoslaw	Poland	GM	2654	1987	FN	1118358
48	2	Vitiugov, Nikita	England	GM	2654	1987	E24	4152956
49	2	Theodorou, Nikolas	Greece	GM	2652	2000	FN	4262875
50	15	Mishra, Abhimanyu	United States	GM	2652	2009	PN	30920019
51	10	Erdogmus, Yagiz Kaan	Turkey	GM	2651	2011	E25	44599790
52	7	Xiong, Jeffery	United States	GM	2648	2000	AM24	2047640
53	6	Rodshtein, Maxim	Israel	GM	2647	1989	E25	2806851
54	11	Artemiev, Vladislav	FIDE	GM	2646	1998	Z3.8	24101605
55	14	Adams, Michael	England	GM	2646	1971	FN	400041
56	3	Grandelius, Nils	Sweden	GM	2645	1993	FN	1710400
57	4	Martinez Alcantara, Jose Eduardo	Mexico	GM	2644	1999	AM25	3805662
58	13	Gledura, Benjamin	Hungary	GM	2643	1999	E25	712779
59	12	Kollars, Dmitrij	Germany	GM	2642	1999	FN	12909572
60	5	Pranav, V	India	GM	2641	2006	ON	25060783
61	8	Donchenko, Alexander	Germany	GM	2641	1998	E24	24603295
62	9	Sadhwani, Raunak	India	GM	2641	2005	ON	35093487
63	16	Vokhidov, Shamsiddin	Uzbekistan	GM	2640	2002	AS25	14204223
64	1	Svane, Frederik	Germany	GM	2638	2004	E24	12923044
65	1	Gurel, Ediz	Turkey	GM	2634	2008	E25	44507356
66	16	Chigaev, Maksim	Spain	GM	2634	1996	E24	4108116
67	9	Hovhannisyan, Robert	Armenia	GM	2633	1991	E24	13302507
68	8	Anton Guijarro, David	Spain	GM	2631	1995	FN	2285525
69	5	Tari, Aryan	Norway	GM	2631	1999	E25	1510045
70	12	Pranesh M	India	GM	2630	2006	AS25	35028600
71	13	Amin, Bassem	Egypt	GM	2629	1988	AF24	10601457
72	4	Ivic, Velimir	Serbia	GM	2628	2002	E24	950122
73	3	Bacrot, Etienne	France	GM	2627	1983	FN	605506
74	14	Cheparinov, Ivan	Bulgaria	GM	2626	1986	E24	2905540
75	11	Martirosyan, Haik M.	Armenia	GM	2626	2000	E25	13306553
76	6	Sargissian, Gabriel	Armenia	GM	2624	1983	E25	13300881
77	7	Yuffa, Daniil	Spain	GM	2621	1997	E24	24131423
78	10	Mendonca, Leon Luke	India	GM	2620	2006	PN	35028561
79	15	Salem, A.R. Saleh	United Arab Emirates	GM	2620	1993	FN	9301348
80	2	Indjic, Aleksandar	Serbia	GM	2618	1995	E24	911925
81	2	Narayanan S L	India	GM	2617	1998	AS25	5058422
82	15	Lagarde, Maxime	France	GM	2617	1994	E25	662399
83	10	Ivanchuk, Vasyl	Ukraine	GM	2616	1969	FN	14100010
84	7	Suleymanli, Aydin	Azerbaijan	GM	2614	2005	FN	13413937
85	6	Svane, Rasmus	Germany	GM	2614	1997	E24	4657101
86	11	Grebnev, Aleksey	FIDE	GM	2611	2006	PN	34189030
87	14	Najer, Evgeniy	FIDE	GM	2610	1977	Z3.8	4118987
88	3	Dardha, Daniel	Belgium	GM	2605	2005	E24	240990
89	4	Henriquez Villagra, Cristobal	Chile	GM	2605	1996	AM24	3409350
90	13	Daneshvar, Bardiya	Iran	GM	2602	2006	Z3.1	12576468
91	12	Idani, Pouya	Iran	GM	2601	1995	Z3.1	12510130
92	5	Iniyan, Pa	India	GM	2599	2002	AS25	25002767
93	8	Zemlyanskii, Ivan	FIDE	GM	2596	2010	AS25	24249971
94	9	Meier, Georg	Uruguay	GM	2596	1987	FN	4675789
95	16	Cheng, Bobby	Australia	GM	2596	1997	FN	4300033
96	1	Cori, Jorge	Peru	GM	2594	1995	FN	3802272
97	1	Yilmaz, Mustafa	Turkey	GM	2591	1992	FN	6302718
98	16	Woodward, Andy	United States	GM	2590	2010	PN	30953499
99	9	Bai, Jinshi	China	GM	2590	1999	Z3.5	8602280
100	8	Adly, Ahmed	Egypt	GM	2589	1987	AF25	10601619
101	5	Huschenbeth, Niclas	Germany	GM	2587	1992	E25	24604747
102	12	Abasov, Nijat	Azerbaijan	GM	2587	1995	WC	13402960
103	13	Motylev, Alexander	Romania	GM	2586	1979	E24	4121830
104	4	Neiksans, Arturs	Latvia	GM	2585	1983	FN	11601388
105	3	Nesterov, Arseniy	FIDE	GM	2584	2003	Z3.8	24198455
106	14	Tin, Jingyao	Singapore	GM	2583	2000	Z3.3	5804418
107	11	Kourkoulos-Arditis, Stamatis	Greece	GM	2583	1998	E25	4221990
108	6	Warmerdam, Max	Netherlands	GM	2582	2000	FN	1048104
109	7	Karthik Venkataraman	India	GM	2579	1999	Z3.7	25006479
110	10	Brkic, Ante	Croatia	GM	2578	1988	FN	14506688
111	15	Fier, Alexandr	Brazil	GM	2577	1988	AM25	2107139
112	2	Lupulescu, Constantin	Romania	GM	2577	1984	E24	1207822
113	2	Petrov, Nikita	Montenegro	GM	2576	1996	FN	4101286
114	15	Bartel, Mateusz	Poland	GM	2575	1985	E24	1112635
115	10	Supi, Luis Paulo	Brazil	GM	2575	1996	FN	2106388
116	7	Jobava, Baadur	Georgia	GM	2573	1983	E25	13601520
117	6	Ghosh, Diptayan	India	GM	2573	1998	Z3.7	5045207
118	11	Ganguly, Surya Shekhar	India	GM	2573	1983	Z3.7	5002150
119	14	Lodici, Lorenzo	Italy	GM	2560	2000	FN	884189
120	3	Kantor, Gergely	Hungary	GM	2559	1999	E25	751499
121	4	Flores, Diego	Argentina	GM	2558	1982	FN	108049
122	13	Piorun, Kacper	Poland	GM	2557	1991	E24	1130420
123	12	Kovalev, Vladislav	FIDE	GM	2557	1994	E24	13504398
124	5	Bogner, Sebastian	Switzerland	GM	2555	1991	FN	4692055
125	8	Can, Emre	Turkey	GM	2552	1990	E24	6302181
126	9	Subelj, Jan	Slovenia	GM	2545	2004	FN	14618583
127	16	Mekhitarian, Krikor Sevag	Brazil	GM	2545	1986	Z2.4	2107660
128	1	Nogerbek, Kazybek	Kazakhstan	GM	2543	2004	U20	13710427
129	1	Raja Rithvik R	India	GM	2541	2004	AS25	35007394
130	16	Petrov, Martin	Bulgaria	GM	2540	2000	FN	2911086
131	9	Kuybokarov, Temur	Australia	GM	2535	2000	Z3.6	14203049
132	8	Maksimovic, Bojan	Bosnia and Herzegovina	IM	2532	2002	FN	14408120
133	5	Stremavicius, Titas	Lithuania	GM	2531	1998	FN	12804444
134	12	Velten, Paul	France	GM	2530	1993	E25	681091
135	13	Lobanov, Sergei	FIDE	GM	2526	2001	AS25	24183750
136	4	Makhnev, Denis	Kazakhstan	GM	2525	2000	FN	13707647
137	3	Rodrigue-Lemieux, Shawn	Canada	GM	2524	2004	FN	2620049
138	14	Samadov, Read	Azerbaijan	IM	2523	2007	E25	13417444
139	11	Ahmadzada, Ahmad	Azerbaijan	GM	2523	2004	E25	13413007
140	6	Peng, Xiongjian	China	GM	2521	2000	Z3.5	8610550
141	7	Cardoso Cardoso, Jose Gabriel	Colombia	GM	2518	2004	AM25	4430492
142	10	Galaviz Medina, Sion Radamantys	Mexico	IM	2515	2005	Z2.3	5123119
143	15	Aronyak Ghosh	India	IM	2514	2003	Z3.7	25072846
144	2	Ghazarian, Kirk	United States	GM	2513	2006	AM24	30908604
145	2	Blohberger, Felix	Austria	GM	2513	2002	FN	1632051
146	15	Parligras, Mircea-Emilian	Romania	GM	2510	1980	FN	1204297
147	10	Oro, Faustino	Argentina	IM	2509	2013	PN	20000197
148	7	Garcia Pantoja, Roberto	Colombia	GM	2502	1992	AM24	3509265
149	6	Lalit Babu M R	India	GM	2502	1993	Z3.7	5024595
150	11	Divya Deshmukh	India	GM	2498	2005	PN	35006916
151	14	Lashkin, Jegor	Moldova	IM	2497	2003	FN	13907808
152	3	Atabayev, Saparmyrat	Turkmenistan	GM	2494	1999	FN	14000571
153	4	Suleymenov, Alisher	Kazakhstan	GM	2491	2000	Z3.4	13707833
154	13	Avila Pavas, Santiago	Colombia	GM	2490	2004	FN	4437128
155	12	Suyarov, Mukhammadzokhid	Uzbekistan	IM	2487	2009	Z3.4	14210495
156	5	Bellahcene, Bilel	Algeria	GM	2485	1998	AF25	696358
157	8	Grigoryan, Karen H.	Armenia	GM	2481	1995	FN	13301004
158	9	Fawzy, Adham	Egypt	GM	2476	2000	FN	10613129
159	16	Gusain, Himal	India	IM	2476	1993	Z3.7	5033861
160	1	Harshavardhan G B	India	IM	2476	2003	AS25	25059009
161	1	Ansat, Aldiyar	Kazakhstan	IM	2470	2008	Z3.4	13715658
162	16	Siddharth, Jagadeesh	Singapore	GM	2467	2007	FN	5818320
163	9	Neelash Saha	India	IM	2466	2002	Z3.7	5094160
164	8	Pantsulaia, Levan	Georgia	GM	2457	1986	FN	13602071
165	5	Berdayes Ason, Dylan Isidro	Cuba	GM	2453	1998	FN	3516016
166	12	Cori Quispe, Kevin Joel	Mexico	GM	2451	1999	FN	3814017
167	13	Salinas Herrera, Pablo	Chile	GM	2451	1994	FN	3407128
168	4	Agibileg, Uurtsaikh	Mongolia	IM	2448	2001	Z3.3	4901606
169	3	Banh Gia Huy	Vietnam	IM	2440	2009	FN	12424714
170	14	Rakotomaharo, Fy Antenaina	Madagascar	IM	2435	1999	FN	13100050
171	11	Quizon, Daniel	Philippines	GM	2420	2004	FN	5217911
172	6	Vazquez, Facundo	Uruguay	IM	2419	2004	Z2.5	3007669
173	7	Laohawirapap, Prin	Thailand	IM	2417	2006	FN	6205003
174	10	Mohammad Fahad, Rahman	Bangladesh	IM	2416	2003	FN	10207791
175	15	Amartuvshin, Ganzorig	Mongolia	IM	2415	2005	FN	4902548
176	2	Rojas Salas, Steven	Peru	IM	2413	2004	Z2.4	3819434
177	2	Schnaider, Ilan	Argentina	IM	2413	2011	Z2.5	169013
178	15	Tran, Thanh Tu	Japan	IM	2407	1990	FN	12401404
179	10	Wang, Shixu B	China	IM	2402	2001	Z3.5	8610665
180	7	Thavandiran, Shiyam	Canada	IM	2402	1992	Z2.2	2605058
181	6	Liyanage, Ranindu Dilshan	Sri Lanka	IM	2401	2003	FN	9915834
182	11	Cahaya, Satria Duta	Indonesia	FM	2393	2008	FN	7124252
183	14	Cordoba Roa, Angel Gabriel	Colombia	IM	2392	2006	Z2.3	3957624
184	3	Mwali, Chitumbo	Zambia	IM	2392	1986	FN	8700265
185	4	Orozbaev, Eldiyar	Kyrgyzstan	IM	2375	2006	FN	13802240
186	13	Mandizha, Farai	Zimbabwe	IM	2375	1985	FN	11000430
187	12	Akhmedinov, Satbek	Kazakhstan	IM	2372	2006	Z3.4	13714287
188	5	Manon, Reja Neer	Bangladesh	IM	2369	2010	Z3.2	10224009
189	8	Silva, David	Angola	IM	2347	1998	FN	10101314
190	9	Kavin Mohan	Malaysia	FM	2346	2011	FN	5739047
191	16	Elbilia, Jacques	Morocco	FM	2332	1971	FN	9000127
192	1	Efimov, Igor	Monaco	GM	2331	1960	Z1.10	806404
193	1	Husbands, Orlando	Barbados	IM	2291	1997	Z2.3	11101644
194	16	Ilkhomi, Jaloliddin	Tajikistan	FM	2289	2007	FN	14700948
195	9	Barrish, Daniel	South Africa	FM	2284	2000	FN	14304600
196	8	Kigigha, Bomo Lovet	Nigeria	FM	2263	1982	FN	8500037
197	5	Boulrens, Ala Eddine	Algeria	untitled	2214	2000	FN	7907559
198	12	Salih, Akar Ali Salih	Iraq	FM	2212	1990	FN	4800575
199	13	Amdouni, Zoubaier	Tunisia	FM	2186	1987	FN	5500419
200	4	Huh, Isaak	South Korea	CM	2139	2011	FN	13209590
201	3	Allam, Mohamed	Palestine	CM	2112	2001	FN	11501731
202	14	Alrehaili, Ahmed Abdullah S	Saudi Arabia	FM	2109	2000	FN	21518840
203	11	Ndahangwapo, Heskiel	Namibia	CM	2093	2000	FN	15202020
204	6	Qin, Oscar Shu Xuan	New Zealand	CM	2078	2008	FN	4304314
205	7	Li, Yiheng	Hong Kong	CM	1994	2012	FN	6006760
206	10	Abugenda, Nagi	Libya	CM	1972	1986	FN	9202544

=== Replacements ===
The following are the players from the list of qualifiers who declined to play, and their replacements:

- Magnus Carlsen (NOR), 2839 (WC) → Vincent Keymer (GER), 2755 (R)
- Fabiano Caruana (USA), 2789 (WC) → Lê Quang Liêm (VIE), 2729 (R)
- Hikaru Nakamura (USA), 2816 (R) → Vidit Gujrathi (IND), 2716 (R)
- Alireza Firouzja (FRA), 2762 (R) → Richárd Rapport (HUN), 2724 (R)
- Viswanathan Anand (IND), 2743 (R) → Yu Yangyi (CHN), 2720 (R)
- Leinier Domínguez (USA), 2738 (Z2.1) → Hans Niemann (USA), 2738 (Z2.1)
- Ju Wenjun (CHN), 2564 (WWC) → Divya Deshmukh (IND), 2498 (PN)

== Round 1–4 ==
Pairings were published on the official FIDE website on 4 October.

=== Section 1 ===
First round
1	(India) D Gukesh	Bye
-	Bye 1
128	(Kazakhstan) K Nogerbek	5
129	(India) R Raja Rithvik	3
65	(Turkey) E Gürel	2
192	(Monaco) I Efimov	0
64	(Germany) F Svane	2
193	(Barbados) O Husbands	0
33	(Armenia) S Sargsyan	Bye
-	Bye 33
96	(Peru) J Cori	3
161	(Kazakhstan) A Aldiyar	1
97	(Turkey) M Yılmaz	1½
160	(India) GB Harshavardhan	½
32	(China) X Bu	Bye
-	Bye 32

Second round
1	(India) D Gukesh	1½
128	(Kazakhstan) K Nogerbek	½
65	(Turkey) E Gürel	½
64	(Germany) F Svane	1½
33	(Armenia) S Sargsyan	3½
96	(Peru) J Cori	2½
97	(Turkey) M Yılmaz	2½
32	(China) X Bu	1½

Third round
1	(India) D Gukesh	½
64	(Germany) F Svane	1½
33	(Armenia) S Sargsyan	1½
97	(Turkey) M Yılmaz	½

Fourth round
64	(Germany) F Svane	2½
33	(Armenia) S Sargsyan	1½

=== Section 2 ===
First round
17	(China) Y Yu	Bye
Bye 17
112	(Romania) C Lupulescu	½
145	(Austria) F Blohberger	1½
81	(India) S. L. Narayanan	3
176	(Peru) S Rojas	1
48	(England) N Vitiugov	Bye
-	Bye 48
49	(Greece) N Theodorou	Bye
-	Bye 49
80	(Serbia) A Inđić	1½
177	(Argentina) I Schnaider	½
113	(Montenegro) N Petrov	w/o
144	(United States) K Ghazarian
16	(Uzbekistan) J Sindarov	Bye
-	Bye 16

Second round
17	(China) Y Yu	4½
145	(Austria) F Blohberger	3½
81	(India) S. L. Narayanan	5
48	(England) N Vitiugov	3
49	(Greece) N Theodorou	2½
80	(Serbia) A Inđić	1½
113	(Montenegro) N Petrov	½
16	(Uzbekistan) J Sindarov	1½

Third round
17	(China) Y Yu	2½
81	(India) S. L. Narayanan	1½
49	(Greece) N Theodorou	½
16	(Uzbekistan) J Sindarov	1½

Fourth round
17	(China) Y Yu	1½
16	(Uzbekistan) J Sindarov	2½

=== Section 3 ===
First round
9	(Azerbaijan) S Mamedyarov	Bye
-	Bye 9
120	(Hungary) G Kantor	1½
137	(Canada) S Rodrigue-Lemieux	½
73	(France) É Bacrot	w/o
184	(Zambia) C Mwali
56	(Sweden) N Grandelius	1½
201	(Palestine) A Mohamed	½
41	(United States) G Oparin	Bye
-	Bye 41
88	(Belgium) D Dardha	2
169	(Vietnam) HG Banh	0
105	(FIDE) A Nesterov	1½
152	(Turkmenistan) S Atabayev	½
24	(India) H Pentala	Bye
-	Bye 24

Second round
9	(Azerbaijan) S Mamedyarov	3
120	(Hungary) G Kantor	1
73	(France) É Bacrot	1½
56	(Sweden) N Grandelius	2½
41	(United States) G Oparin	1½
88	(Belgium) D Dardha	2½
105	(FIDE) A Nesterov	½
24	(India) H Pentala	1½

Third round
9	(Azerbaijan) S Mamedyarov	½
56	(Sweden) N Grandelius	1½
88	(Belgium) D Dardha	½
24	(India) H Pentala	1½

Fourth round
56	(Sweden) N Grandelius	1½
24	(India) H Pentala	2½

=== Section 4 ===
First round
25	(Netherlands) J van Foreest	Bye
-	Bye 25
104	(Latvia) A Neikšāns	1½
153	(Kazakhstan) A Suleymenov	2½
89	(Chile) C Henríquez Villagra	2½
168	(Mongolia) Ü Agibileg	1½
40	(Serbia) A Sarana	Bye
-	Bye 40
57	(Mexico) J Martínez	2
200	(South Korea) H Isaak	0
72	(Serbia) V Ivić	2
185	(Kyrgyzstan) E Orozbaev	0
121	(Argentina) D Flores	1½
136	(Kazakhstan) D Makhnev	2½
8	(Uzbekistan) N Abdusattorov	Bye
-	Bye 8

Second round
25	(Netherlands) J van Foreest	1½
153	(Kazakhstan) A Suleymenov	½
89	(Chile) C Henríquez Villagra	½
40	(Serbia) A Sarana	1½
57	(Mexico) J Martínez	4½
72	(Serbia) V Ivić	3½
136	(Kazakhstan) D Makhnev	1½
8	(Uzbekistan) N Abdusattorov	2½

Third round
25	(Netherlands) J van Foreest	1
40	(Serbia) A Sarana	3
57	(Mexico) J Martínez	2
8	(Uzbekistan) N Abdusattorov	0

Fourth round
40	(Serbia) A Sarana	½
57	(Mexico) J Martínez	1½

=== Section 5 ===
First round
5	(United States) W So	Bye
-	Bye 5
124	(Switzerland) S Bogner	1½
133	(Lithuania) T Stremavičius	2½
69	(Norway) A Tari	1½
188	(Bangladesh) M Reja Neer	½
60	(India) V Pranav	2
197	(Algeria) A Boulrens	0
37	(Czech Republic) TDV Nguyen	Bye
-	Bye 37
92	(India) P Iniyan	1½
165	(Cuba) D Berdayes Ason	½
101	(Germany) N Huschenbeth	1½
156	(Algeria) B Bellahcene	½
28	(Uzbekistan) N Yakubboev	Bye
-	Bye 28

Second round
5	(United States) W So	½
133	(Lithuania) T Stremavičius	1½
69	(Norway) A Tari	1½
60	(India) V Pranav	2½
37	(Czech Republic) TDV Nguyen	1½
92	(India) P Iniyan	½
101	(Germany) N Huschenbeth	½
28	(Uzbekistan) N Yakubboev	1½

Third round
133	(Lithuania) T Stremavičius	½
60	(India) V Pranav	1½
37	(Czech Republic) TDV Nguyen	1
28	(Uzbekistan) N Yakubboev	3

Fourth round
60	(India) V Pranav	½
28	(Uzbekistan) N Yakubboev	1½

=== Section 6 ===
First round
21	(United States) A Liang	Bye
-	Bye 21
108	(Netherlands) M Warmerdam	5
149	(India) MR Lalith Babu	3
85	(Germany) R Svane	1½
172	(Uruguay) F Vázquez	½
44	(Azerbaijan) R Mamedov	Bye
-	Bye 44
53	(Israel) M Rodshtein	2
204	(New Zealand) O Qin	0
76	(Armenia) G Sargissian	1½
181	(Sri Lanka) R Liyanage	½
117	(India) D Ghosh	3
140	(China) X Peng	1
12	(FIDE) I Nepomniachtchi	Bye
-	Bye 12

Second round
21	(United States) A Liang	2
108	(Netherlands) M Warmerdam	0
85	(Germany) R Svane	6
44	(Azerbaijan) R Mamedov	5
53	(Israel) M Rodshtein	2
76	(Armenia) G Sargissian	4
117	(India) D Ghosh	1½
12	(FIDE) I Nepomniachtchi	½

Third round
21	(United States) A Liang	1½
85	(Germany) R Svane	½
76	(Armenia) G Sargissian	1½
117	(India) D Ghosh	½

Fourth round
21	(United States) A Liang	1½
76	(Armenia) G Sargissian	2½

=== Section 7 ===
First round
13	(Vietnam) LQ Lê	Bye
-	Bye 13
116	(Georgia (country)) B Jobava	2½
141	(Colombia) J Cardoso Cardoso	1½
77	(Spain) D Yuffa	5
180	(Canada) S Thavandiran	3
52	(United States) J Xiong	1½
205	(Hong Kong) Y Li	½
45	(Romania) B-D Deac	Bye
-	Bye 45
84	(Azerbaijan) A Suleymanli	2
173	(Thailand) P Laohawirapap	0
109	(India) V Karthik	1½
148	(Colombia) R García Pantoja	½
20	(India) C Aravindh	Bye
-	Bye 20

Second round
13	(Vietnam) LQ Lê	1½
116	(Georgia (country)) B Jobava	½
77	(Spain) D Yuffa	0
52	(United States) J Xiong	2
45	(Romania) B-D Deac	2½
84	(Azerbaijan) A Suleymanli	1½
109	(India) V Karthik	1½
20	(India) C Aravindh	½

Third round
13	(Vietnam) LQ Lê	1½
52	(United States) J Xiong	½
45	(Romania) B-D Deac	1½
109	(India) V Karthik	2½

Fourth round
13	(Vietnam) LQ Lê	1½
109	(India) V Karthik	½

=== Section 8 ===
First round
29	(Germany) M Blübaum	Bye
-	Bye 29
100	(Egypt) A Adly	4½
157	(Armenia) KH Grigoryan	3½
93	(FIDE) I Zemlyanskii	1½
164	(Georgia (country)) L Pantsulaia	½
36	(United States) R Robson	Bye
-	Bye 36
61	(Germany) A Donchenko	2
196	(Nigeria) B Kigigha	0
68	(Spain) D Antón Guijarro	2
189	(Angola) D Silva	0
125	(Turkey) E Can	1
132	(Bosnia and Herzegovina) B Maksimović	3
4	(Netherlands) A Giri	Bye
-	Bye 4

Second round
29	(Germany) M Blübaum	1½
100	(Egypt) A Adly	½
93	(FIDE) I Zemlyanskii	1½
36	(United States) R Robson	½
61	(Germany) A Donchenko	1½
68	(Spain) D Antón Guijarro	½
132	(Bosnia and Herzegovina) B Maksimović	½
4	(Netherlands) A Giri	1½

Third round
29	(Germany) M Blübaum	1½
93	(FIDE) I Zemlyanskii	½
61	(Germany) A Donchenko	1½
4	(Netherlands) A Giri	½

Fourth round
29	(Germany) M Blübaum	½
61	(Germany) A Donchenko	1½

=== Section 9 ===
First round
3	(India) R Praggnanandhaa	Bye
-	Bye 3
126	(Slovenia) J Subelj	1
131	(Australia) T Kuybokarov	3
67	(Armenia) R Hovhannisyan	2½
190	(Malaysia) M Kavin	1½
62	(India) R Sadhwani	1½
195	(South Africa) D Barrish	½
35	(FIDE) V Murzin	Bye
-	Bye 35
94	(Uruguay) G Meier	1½
163	(India) N Saha	½
99	(China) J Bai	1½
158	(Egypt) A Fawzy	½
30	(FIDE) D Dubov	Bye
-	Bye 30

Second round
3	(India) R Praggnanandhaa	5
131	(Australia) T Kuybokarov	3
67	(Armenia) R Hovhannisyan	3
62	(India) R Sadhwani	1
35	(FIDE) V Murzin	½
94	(Uruguay) G Meier	1½
99	(China) J Bai	2
30	(FIDE) D Dubov	4

Third round
3	(India) R Praggnanandhaa	1½
67	(Armenia) R Hovhannisyan	½
94	(Uruguay) G Meier	2½
30	(FIDE) D Dubov	3½

Fourth round
3	(India) R Praggnanandhaa	1½
30	(FIDE) D Dubov	2½

=== Section 10 ===
First round
19	(India) V Gujrathi	Bye
-	Bye 19
110	(Croatia) A Brkić	3
147	(Argentina) F Oro	5
83	(Ukraine) V Ivanchuk	1½
174	(Bangladesh) R Fahad	½
46	(United States) S Shankland	Bye
-	Bye 46
51	(Turkey) YK Erdoğmuş	2
206	(Libya) N Abugenda	0
78	(India) LL Mendonca	½
179	(China) S Wang	1½
115	(Brazil) LP Supi	2½
142	(Mexico) S Radamantys Galaviz	1½
14	(Hungary) R Rapport	Bye
-	Bye 14

Second round
19	(India) V Gujrathi	2½
147	(Argentina) F Oro	1½
83	(Ukraine) V Ivanchuk	0
46	(United States) S Shankland	2
51	(Turkey) YK Erdoğmuş	2
179	(China) S Wang	0
115	(Brazil) LP Supi	0
14	(Hungary) R Rapport	2

Third round
19	(India) V Gujrathi	2½
46	(United States) S Shankland	3½
51	(Turkey) YK Erdoğmuş	1½
14	(Hungary) R Rapport	2½

Fourth round
46	(United States) S Shankland	3
14	(Hungary) R Rapport	1

=== Section 11 ===
First round
11	(France) M Vachier-Lagrave	Bye
-	Bye 11
118	(India) S Ganguly	2
139	(Azerbaijan) A Ahmadzada	0
75	(Armenia) HM Martirosyan	1½
182	(Indonesia) SC Duta	½
54	(FIDE) V Artemiev	2
203	(Namibia) H Ndahangwapo	0
43	(Czech Republic) D Navara	Bye
-	Bye 43
86	(FIDE) A Grebnev	1½
171	(Philippines) D Quizon	½
107	(Greece) S Kourkoulos-Arditis	2
150	(India) D Deshmukh	0
22	(India) S Nihal	Bye
-	Bye 22

Second round
11	(France) M Vachier-Lagrave	1½
118	(India) S Ganguly	½
75	(Armenia) HM Martirosyan	1½
54	(FIDE) V Artemiev	2½
43	(Czech Republic) D Navara	½
86	(FIDE) A Grebnev	1½
107	(Greece) S Kourkoulos-Arditis	2½
22	(India) S Nihal	1½

Third round
11	(France) M Vachier-Lagrave	6
54	(FIDE) V Artemiev	5
86	(FIDE) A Grebnev	1½
107	(Greece) S Kourkoulos-Arditis	½

Fourth round
11	(France) M Vachier-Lagrave	1½
86	(FIDE) A Grebnev	2½

=== Section 12 ===
First round
27	(FIDE) A Esipenko	Bye
-	Bye 27
102	(Azerbaijan) N Abasov	2
155	(Uzbekistan) M Suyarov	0
91	(Iran) P Idani	2
166	(Mexico) K Cori Quispe	0
38	(India) M Karthikeyan	Bye
-	Bye 38
59	(Germany) D Kollars	2
198	(Iraq) AA Salih Salih	0
70	(India) M Pranesh	1½
187	(Kazakhstan) S Akhmedinov	½
123	(FIDE) V Kovalev	1½
134	(France) P Velten	½
6	(Germany) V Keymer	Bye
-	Bye 6

Second round
27	(FIDE) A Esipenko	2
102	(Azerbaijan) N Abasov	0
91	(Iran) P Idani	4½
38	(India) M Karthikeyan	3½
59	(Germany) D Kollars	1
70	(India) M Pranesh	3
123	(FIDE) V Kovalev	0
6	(Germany) V Keymer	2

Third round
27	(FIDE) A Esipenko	3½
91	(Iran) P Idani	2½
70	(India) M Pranesh	½
6	(Germany) V Keymer	1½

Fourth round
27	(FIDE) A Esipenko	4
6	(Germany) V Keymer	2

=== Section 13 ===
First round
7	(China) Y Wei	Bye
-	Bye 7
122	(Poland) K Piorun	2½
135	(FIDE) S Lobanov	1½
71	(Egypt) B Amin	w/o
186	(Zimbabwe) F Mandizha
58	(Hungary) B Gledura	2
199	(Tunisia) Z Amdouni	0
39	(Croatia) I Šarić	Bye
-	Bye 39
90	(Iran) B Daneshvar	1½
167	(Chile) P Salinas Herrera	½
103	(Romania) A Motylev	2
154	(Colombia) S Avila Pavas	0
26	(Iran) P Maghsoodloo	Bye
-	Bye 26

Second round
7	(China) Y Wei	2
122	(Poland) K Piorun	0
71	(Egypt) B Amin	½
58	(Hungary) B Gledura	1½
39	(Croatia) I Šarić	1½
90	(Iran) B Daneshvar	½
103	(Romania) A Motylev	½
26	(Iran) P Maghsoodloo	1½

Third round
7	(China) Y Wei	2½
58	(Hungary) B Gledura	1½
39	(Croatia) I Šarić	½
26	(Iran) P Maghsoodloo	1½

Fourth round
7	(China) Y Wei	5
26	(Iran) P Maghsoodloo	3

=== Section 14 ===
First round
23	(United States) S Sevian	Bye
-	Bye 23
106	(Singapore) J Tin	3
151	(Moldova) J Lashkin	1
87	(FIDE) E Najer	1½
170	(Madagascar) F Rakotomaharo	½
42	(Norway) J-S Christiansen	Bye
-	Bye 42
55	(England) M Adams	2
202	(Saudi Arabia) A Alrehaili	0
74	(Bulgaria) I Cheparinov	1½
183	(Colombia) A Cordoba Roa	½
119	(Italy) L Lodici	1½
138	(Azerbaijan) R Samadov	½
10	(United States) HM Niemann	Bye
-	Bye 10

Second round
23	(United States) S Sevian	3
106	(Singapore) J Tin	1
87	(FIDE) E Najer	1½
42	(Norway) J-S Christiansen	½
55	(England) M Adams	6
74	(Bulgaria) I Cheparinov	4
119	(Italy) L Lodici	2½
10	(United States) HM Niemann	1½

Third round
23	(United States) S Sevian	3
87	(FIDE) E Najer	1
55	(England) M Adams	½
119	(Italy) L Lodici	1½

Fourth round
23	(United States) S Sevian	6
119	(Italy) L Lodici	5

=== Section 15 ===
First round
15	(United States) L Aronian	Bye
-	Bye 15
114	(Poland) M Bartel	2
143	(India) A Ghosh	4
79	(United Arab Emirates) S Saleh	2
178	(Japan) TT Trần	0
50	(United States) A Mishra	Bye
-	Bye 50
47	(Poland) R Wojtaszek	Bye
-	Bye 47
82	(France) M Lagarde	1½
175	(Mongolia) G Amartüvshin	½
111	(Brazil) A Fier	1½
146	(Romania) M-E Parligras	½
18	(Slovenia) V Fedoseev	Bye
-	Bye 18

Second round
15	(United States) L Aronian	1½
143	(India) A Ghosh	½
79	(United Arab Emirates) S Saleh	1½
50	(United States) A Mishra	½
47	(Poland) R Wojtaszek	2½
82	(France) M Lagarde	1½
111	(Brazil) A Fier	½
18	(Slovenia) V Fedoseev	1½

Third round
15	(United States) L Aronian	1½
79	(United Arab Emirates) S Saleh	½
47	(Poland) R Wojtaszek	2
18	(Slovenia) V Fedoseev	0

Fourth round
15	(United States) L Aronian	1½
47	(Poland) R Wojtaszek	½

=== Section 16 ===
First round
31	(Austria) K Alekseenko	Bye
-	Bye 31
98	(United States) A Woodward	2
159	(India) H Gusain	0
95	(Australia) B Cheng	1½
162	(Singapore) S Jagadeesh	½
34	(Hungary) P Leko	Bye
-	Bye 34
63	(Uzbekistan) S Vokhidov	2
194	(Tajikistan) J Ilkhomi	0
66	(Spain) M Chigaev	1½
191	(Morocco) J Elbilia	½
127	(Brazil) K Mekhitarian	½
130	(Bulgaria) M Petrov	1½
2	(India) A Erigaisi	Bye
-	Bye 2

Second round
31	(Austria) K Alekseenko	1½
98	(United States) A Woodward	½
95	(Australia) B Cheng	½
34	(Hungary) P Leko	1½
63	(Uzbekistan) S Vokhidov	3
66	(Spain) M Chigaev	1
130	(Bulgaria) M Petrov	0
2	(India) A Erigaisi	2

Third round
31	(Austria) K Alekseenko	0
34	(Hungary) P Leko	2
63	(Uzbekistan) S Vokhidov	½
2	(India) A Erigaisi	1½

Fourth round
34	(Hungary) P Leko	1
2	(India) A Erigaisi	3

== Round 5–8 ==
Fifth round
64	(Germany) Frederik Svane	½
16	(Uzbekistan) Javokhir Sindarov	1½
24	(India) Pentala Harikrishna	2½
57	(Mexico) José Martínez Alcántara	3½
28	(Uzbekistan) Nodirbek Yakubboev	1½
76	(Armenia) Gabriel Sargissian	½
13	(Vietnam) Lê Quang Liêm	3½
61	(Germany) Alexander Donchenko	4½
30	(FIDE) Daniil Dubov	1
46	(United States) Sam Shankland	3
86	(FIDE) Aleksey Grebnev	1½
27	(FIDE) Andrey Esipenko	2½
7	(China) Wei Yi	1½
23	(United States) Samuel Sevian	½
15	(United States) Levon Aronian	½
2	(India) Arjun Erigaisi	1½

Quarterfinals
16	(Uzbekistan) Javokhir Sindarov	3½
57	(Mexico) José Martínez Alcántara	2½
28	(Uzbekistan) Nodirbek Yakubboev	1½
61	(Germany) Alexander Donchenko	½
46	(United States) Sam Shankland	2
27	(FIDE) Andrey Esipenko	4
7	(China) Wei Yi	2½
2	(India) Arjun Erigaisi	1½

Semi-finals
16	(Uzbekistan) Javokhir Sindarov	2½
28	(Uzbekistan) Nodirbek Yakubboev	1½
27	(FIDE) Andrey Esipenko	1½
7	(China) Wei Yi	2½

Final
16	(Uzbekistan) Javokhir Sindarov	2½
7	(China) Wei Yi	1½
Third place
28	(Uzbekistan) Nodirbek Yakubboev	0
27	(FIDE) Andrey Esipenko	2

=== Third place ===
Seed	Name	Nov 2025 rating	1	2	Total
28	(Uzbekistan) Nodirbek Yakubboev	2689	0	0	0
27	(FIDE) Andrey Esipenko	2681	1	1	2

=== Final ===
Seed	Name	Nov 2025 rating	1	2	R1	R2	Total
16	(Uzbekistan) Javokhir Sindarov	2721	½	½	½	1	2½
7	(China) Wei Yi	2753	½	½	½	0	1½

== See also ==
- Women's Chess World Cup 2025
