= Chennai Grand Masters =

Annual chess tournament held in Chennai, India

Tournament information
- Sport: Chess
- Location: Chennai, India
- Established: 2023
- Format: Round-robin tournament

Current champion
- (France) Alireza Firouzja

The Chennai Grand Masters is an annual closed chess tournament held in Chennai, India.

== Winners ==
#	Year	Winner
1	2023	Gukesh Dommaraju (India)
2	2024	Aravindh Chithambaram (India)
3	2025	Vincent Keymer (Germany)
4	2026	Alireza Firouzja (France)

== 2023 ==
The 2023 Chennai Grand Masters was organized from 15 December to 21 December at The Leela Palace Chennai. It was organized by MGD1, NODWIN Gaming, and ChessBase India, with support from the Tamil Nadu Government and Sports Development Authority of Tamil Nadu.

The tournament was announced only 4 days prior to its start, which led to criticism that the tournament was held at the last minute to help Gukesh Dommaraju and Arjun Erigaisi qualify for the Candidates Tournament 2024. However, FIDE deputy president Viswanathan Anand explained that the organization of the tournament is within the rules.

After the seventh round, Gukesh and Arjun were tied for the first place with 4.5 points each. The Sonneborn–Berger score was used as the tie-breaker, and Gukesh emerged victorious.

1st Chennai Grand Masters, 15–21 December 2023, Chennai, India, Category XIX (2711)
	Player	Rating	1	2	3	4	5	6	7	8	Points	SB
1	Gukesh Dommaraju (India)	2720		½	½	½	½	½	1	1	4½	13.75
2	Arjun Erigaisi (India)	2727	½		0	½	½	1	1	1	4½	13.00
3	Pentala Harikrishna (India)	2696	½	1		½	½	½	½	½	4	14.25
4	Pavel Eljanov (Ukraine)	2691	½	½	½		½	1	0	1	4	13.25
5	Levon Aronian (USA)	2723	½	½	½	½		½	½	½	3½	12.25
6	Parham Maghsoodloo (Iran)	2742	½	0	½	0	½		1	1	3½	10.00
7	Sanan Sjugirov (Hungary)	2703	0	0	½	1	½	0		½	2½	8.50
8	Alexandr Predke (Serbia)	2689	0	0	½	0	½	0	½		1½	5.00

== 2024 ==
The 2024 edition was India's strongest classical super-tournament of the year. It was held from 5 November to 11 November at the Anna Centenary Library.

After the seventh round, there was a three-way tie between Levon Aronian, Arjun Erigaisi, and Aravindh Chithambaram. Aravindh was declared the winner after tiebreaks. The challengers section was won by V. Pranav.

=== Masters ===
2nd Chennai Grand Masters, 5–11 November 2024, Chennai, India, Category XIX (2725)
	Player	Rating	1	2	3	4	5	6	7	8	Points
1	Aravindh Chithambaram (India)	2706		½	1	½	½	1	½	½	4½
2	Levon Aronian (USA)	2739	½		½	½	1	1	½	½	4½
3	Arjun Erigaisi (India)	2799	0	½		1	½	½	1	1	4½
4	Amin Tabatabaei (Iran)	2686	½	½	0		1	½	1	½	4
5	Maxime Vachier-Lagrave (France)	2737	½	0	½	0		1	½	½	3
6	Parham Maghsoodloo (Iran)	2712	0	0	½	½	0		½	1	2½
7	Alexey Sarana (Serbia)	2679	½	½	0	0	½	½		½	2½
8	Vidit Gujrathi (India)	2739	½	½	0	½	½	0	½		2½

==== Tiebreaks ====
The tiebreak was a two-game blitz match, followed by an armageddon if necessary. The time control was 3 minutes with a 2-second increment per move. Aravindh was given a bye because he had a better score in terms of direct encounters, beating Arjun in their game. He then won the final match against Levon Aronian, who had proceeded after holding a draw as black in the armageddon game.

Semifinals			Finals
			1	(India) Aravindh Chithambaram	2
2	(United States) Levon Aronian	1½	2	(United States) Levon Aronian	0
3	(India) Arjun Erigaisi	1½

=== Challengers ===
1st Chennai Grand Masters Challengers, 5–11 November 2024, Chennai, India, Category XIV (2594)
	Player	Rating	1	2	3	4	5	6	7	8	Points
1	(India) Pranav V	2602		½	½	1	1	½	1	1	5½
2	(India) Leon Luke Mendonca	2631	½		½	1	½	½	1	1	5
3	(India) Raunak Sadhwani	2677	½	½		1	½	½	½	½	4
4	(India) Karthikeyan Murali	2625	0	0	0		1	½	1	1	3½
5	(India) Abhimanyu Puranik	2652	0	½	½	0		1	½	1	3½
6	(India) Pranesh M	2580	½	½	½	½	0		½	1	3½
7	(India) Harika Dronavalli	2493	0	0	½	0	½	½		½	2
8	(India) Vaishali Rameshbabu	2490	0	0	½	0	0	0	½		1

== 2025 ==
The 2025 edition was India's strongest classical super-tournament of the year. It was held from 7 August to 15 August at the Hyatt Regency Chennai, after a one-day delay caused by a fire incident at the players’ hotel.

Vincent Keymer won the tournament with one round to spare. Pranesh M won the Challengers section.

=== Masters ===
3rd Quantbox Chennai Grand Masters, 7–16 August 2025, Chennai, India, Category XVIII (2700)
	Player	Rating	1	2	3	4	5	6	7	8	9	10	Points
1	Vincent Keymer (Germany)	2730		½	½	1	1	1	½	½	1	1	7
2	Anish Giri (Netherlands)	2748	½		½	½	½	½	½	1	½	½	5
3	Arjun Erigaisi (India)	2776	½	½		½	0	1	½	½	½	1	5
4	Karthikeyan Murali (India)	2658	0	½	½		½	½	1	1	½	½	5
5	Nihal Sarin (India)	2692	0	½	1	½		½	0	0	1	1	4½
6	Awonder Liang (United States)	2696	0	½	0	½	½		½	1	1	½	4½
7	Vidit Gujrathi (India)	2720	½	½	½	0	1	½		½	½	0	4
8	Jorden van Foreest (Netherlands)	2697	½	0	½	0	1	0	½		½	1	4
9	Pranav V (India)	2597	0	½	½	½	0	0	½	½		½	3
10	Ray Robson (United States)	2687	0	½	0	½	0	½	1	0	½		3

=== Challengers ===
2nd Quantbox Chennai Grand Masters Challengers, 7–16 August 2025, Chennai, India, Category XIII (2558)
	Player	Rating	1	2	3	4	5	6	7	8	9	10	Points
1	(India) GM Pranesh M	2589		½	1	½	1	½	0	1	1	1	6½
2	(India) GM Adhiban Baskaran	2534	½		½	1	½	1	1	½	½	½	6
3	(India) GM Abhimanyu Puranik	2635	0	½		1	0	1	1	½	1	1	6
4	(India) GM Leon Luke Mendonca	2606	½	0	0		½	1	1	1	1	1	6
5	(India) GM P. Iniyan	2586	0	½	1	½		½	½	1	1	½	5½
6	(India) GM Diptayan Ghosh	2576	½	0	0	0	½		1	½	1	1	4½
7	(India) IM Harshavardhan G. B.	2454	1	0	0	0	½	0		½	1	1	4
8	(India) GM Aryan Chopra	2634	0	½	½	0	0	½	½		1	1	4
9	(India) GM Harika Dronavalli	2487	0	½	0	0	0	0	0	0		1	1½
10	(India) GM Vaishali Rameshbabu	2476	0	½	0	0	½	0	0	0	0		1

== 2026 ==
The 2026 edition took place from 16 July to 22 July at the The Westin Chennai Velachery.

4th Quantbox Chennai Grand Masters, 16–22 July 2026, Chennai, India, Category XX (2726.5)
	Player	Rating	1	2	3	4	5	6	7	8	Points	H2H	SB
1	Alireza Firouzja (France)	2749		½	½	½	1	½	½	1	4½		14.50
2	Dmitry Andreikin (FIDE)	2710	½		½	1	½	½	½	½	4	½	13.75
3	Arjun Erigaisi (India)	2757	½	½		½	½	0	1	1	4	½	12.75
4	Nodirbek Abdusattorov (Uzbekistan)	2766	½	0	½		½	1	½	½	3½	1½	12.00
5	Pranesh M (India)	2666	0	½	½	½		½	½	1	3½	1	11.00
6	Nihal Sarin (India)	2717	½	½	1	0	½		½	½	3½	½	12.50
7	Hans Niemann (United States)	2730	½	½	0	½	½	½		½	3		10.50
8	Gukesh Dommaraju (India)	2717	0	½	0	½	0	½	½		2		7.00
