= Himal Gusain =

Indian chess player (born 1993)

Personal information
- Born: September 21, 1993 (age 32) Chandigarh, India

Chess career
- Country: India
- Title: International Master (2017)
- FIDE rating: 2451 (July 2026)
- Peak rating: 2528 (November 2024)

Himal Gusain is an Indian chess player.

== Chess career ==
In May 2025, he won the Locarno Open with a perfect score of 5/5, a full point ahead of runner-up Jakub Bednarczuk.

In June 2025, he won the Dolomiti International Chess Tournament after beating grandmaster Martin Petrov on tiebreak scores. Later that month, he won the Salento Open Masters with a perfect score of 9/9, two points ahead of runner-up Cecile Haussernot.

He played in the Chess World Cup 2025, where he was defeated by Andy Woodward in the first round.
