= Pouya Idani =

Iranian chess grandmaster (born 1995)

Pouya Idani پویا ایدنی
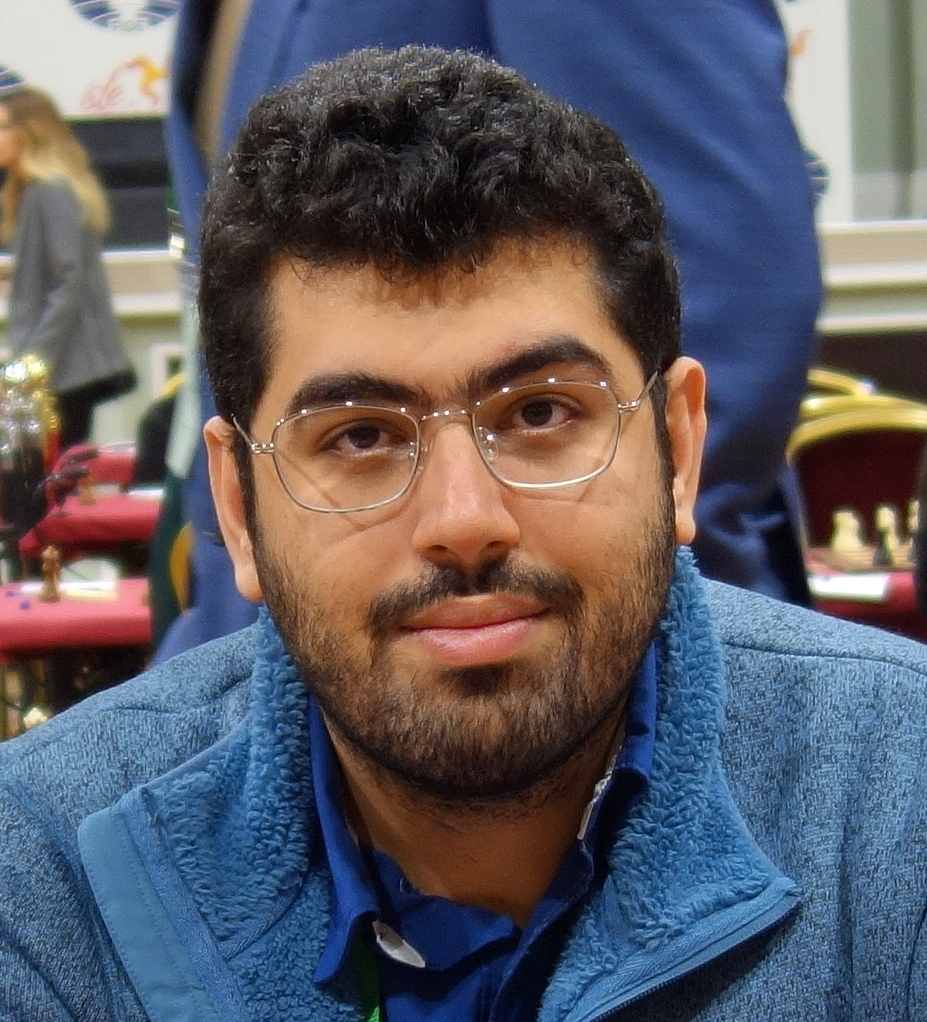
- Idani in 2023

Personal information
- Born: 22 September 1995 (age 30) Ahvaz, Iran

Chess career
- Country: Iran (until 2026); France (since 2026)
- Title: Grandmaster (2014)
- FIDE rating: 2615 (September 2026)
- Peak rating: 2647 (September 2022)
- Peak ranking: No. 101 (September 2022)

Pouya Idani (Persian: پویا ایدنی; born 22 September 1995) is an Iranian chess grandmaster playing for France. He won the World U18 chess Championship in 2013. He was the 2nd best chess player in Iran (as of June 2021).

In September 2026, Idani announced his decision to transfer from the Iranian chess federation to the French chess federation, citing "broken promises and unpaid bonuses" as the reason for the move. Before switching federation, Idani had resided in Brest, France since 2023.

== Chess career ==
In 2008, Idani won 2nd place at the 7th Dubai Juniors Chess Championship and at the 4th World Schools Chess Championships - Open U13 in Singapore. In 2009, he won 2nd place at the Iranian U14 Championship, and tied for 5th place at the World U14 Championship with Mads Andersen.

Idani won the Iranian U18 championship in 2011.

He tied 3rd to 8th place at the World U18 Championship in 2012 with Jorge Cori, Jan-Krzysztof Duda, Gábor Nagy, Kacper Drozdowski, and Vladislav Kovalev.

Idani represented his country in a number of chess olympiads, including 2012 and 2014.

He played in the Chess World Cup 2015, where he was defeated in the first round by Shakhriyar Mamedyarov.

He is the champion of the 2018 Goa Open tournament.

He qualified again for the Chess World Cup 2021 where, ranked 85th, he defeated Ziaur Rahman 2–0 in the first round, David Antón Guijarro 1.5-0.5 in the second round, and 21st-seed Evgeny Tomashevsky 2.5-1.5 in the third round. He was eliminated in the fourth round by the eventual winner Jan-Krzysztof Duda. He played as the 91st seed in the Chess World Cup 2025, where he won against 166th and 38th seeds Kevin Cori and Karthikeyan Murali 2-0 and 4.5-3.5, before losing to Andrey Esipenko in the third round 3.5-2.5, who eventually got third place in the tournament.
