= Neelash Saha =

Indian chess player (born 2002)

Personal information
- Born: November 1, 2002 (age 23) Kolkata, India

Chess career
- Country: India
- Title: International Master (2019)
- FIDE rating: 2476 (July 2026)
- Peak rating: 2490 (January 2025)

Neelash Saha is an Indian chess player.

== Chess career ==
In August 2024, Saha tied for first place at the 61st Indian National Championship with Karthik Venkataraman and Surya Sekhar Ganguly, scoring 9/11. He placed third on tiebreaks.

In December 2024, Saha was in a three-way tie with Quoc Hy Nguyen and grandmaster Alexei Fedorov for first place after the seventh round of the Odisha Open.

In June 2025, Saha won the open section of the Late Bharatbai Halkude Memorial Chess Festival with a perfect score of 9/9.

Saha played in the Chess World Cup 2025, where he was defeated by Georg Meier in the first round.

In September 2025, Saha finished second in the Diamond City Rapid Open behind S. P. Sethuraman.
