= Steven Rojas =

Peruvian chess player (born 2004)

Personal information
- Born: May 25, 2004 (age 22)

Chess career
- Country: Peru
- Title: International Master (2025)
- Peak rating: 2431 (August 2025)

Steven Javier Rojas Salas is a Peruvian chess player.

== Chess career ==
In February 2025, he won the Zonal 2.4 tournament, qualifying to the World Cup. Throughout the tournament, he defeated grandmaster Alexandr Fier and held draws against grandmasters Krikor Mekhitarian and Cristhian Cruz Sánchez.

In May 2025, he tied with six other players for 8th place in the American Continental Chess Championship. He was the highest-finishing IM in the event.

In November 2025, he held grandmaster S. L. Narayanan to a draw in the first round of the first game in the Chess World Cup 2025, though was ultimately eliminated in that round.
