= Roberto García Pantoja =

Cuban-Colombian chess grandmaster (born 1992)

Personal information
- Born: October 31, 1992 (age 33) Havana, Cuba

Chess career
- Country: Cuba (until 2023); Colombia (since 2023)
- Title: Grandmaster (2019)
- FIDE rating: 2481 (July 2026)
- Peak rating: 2550 (July 2024)

Roberto García Pantoja is a Cuban chess grandmaster who plays for Colombia.

== Chess career ==
In July 2019, he played in the Continental Chess Tournament, where he was tied for second place after the fifth round.

In June 2024, he won the classical portion of the Absolute Continental Chess Championship of the Americas.

In September 2024, he played for Colombia on the top board in the 45th Chess Olympiad. He played against Magnus Carlsen in the third round, who almost forfeited the game after arriving late.

He played in the Chess World Cup 2025, where he was defeated by Karthik Venkataraman in the first round.
