= Wang Shixu =

Chinese chess player (born 2001)

Personal information
- Born: December 2001 (age 24) Tianjin, China

Chess career
- Country: China
- Title: International Master (2021)
- FIDE rating: 2437 (July 2026)
- Peak rating: 2484 (November 2021)

Wang Shixu (Chinese: 王仕戌) is a Chinese chess player.

In chess circles, he is sometimes known as "Wang Shixu b" since there is another Chinese chess player named Wang Shixu.

== Chess career ==
In October 2019, he finished in 6th place at the World Junior Chess Championship despite being an untitled player. He also earned his first GM norm.

In September 2021, he played for China in the FIDE Online Chess Olympiad 2021, where the team won the bronze medal.

In May 2025, he played in the B section of the Sharjah Masters, where he finished 12th with 6/9 and held a draw against grandmaster Vladimir Burmakin.

He qualified for the Chess World Cup 2025 by finishing in third place at the Zonal 3.5 China tournament. He caused an upset by eliminating grandmaster Leon Luke Mendonca in the first round, though was eliminated by Yağız Kaan Erdoğmuş in the second round.
