= David Silva (disambiguation) =

David Silva (David Josué Jiménez Silva, born 1986) is a Spanish international footballer.

David Silva may also refer to:

- David Mendes da Silva (David Miquel Mendes da Silva Gonçalves, born 1982), Dutch football defensive midfielder
- David Silva (actor) (1917–1976), Mexican film actor
- David Silva (linguist) (born 1964), American linguist and academic administrator
- David Silva (footballer, born October 1986) (David Mendes da Silva), Portuguese-born Cape Verdean football winger
- David Silva (footballer, born December 1986) (David Mackalister Silva Mosquera), Colombian football midfielder
- David Silva Fernandes (born 1986), Brazilian football defender
- David Silva (chess player), Angolan chess player
