= Andy Woodward (chess player) =

American chess grandmaster (born 2010)

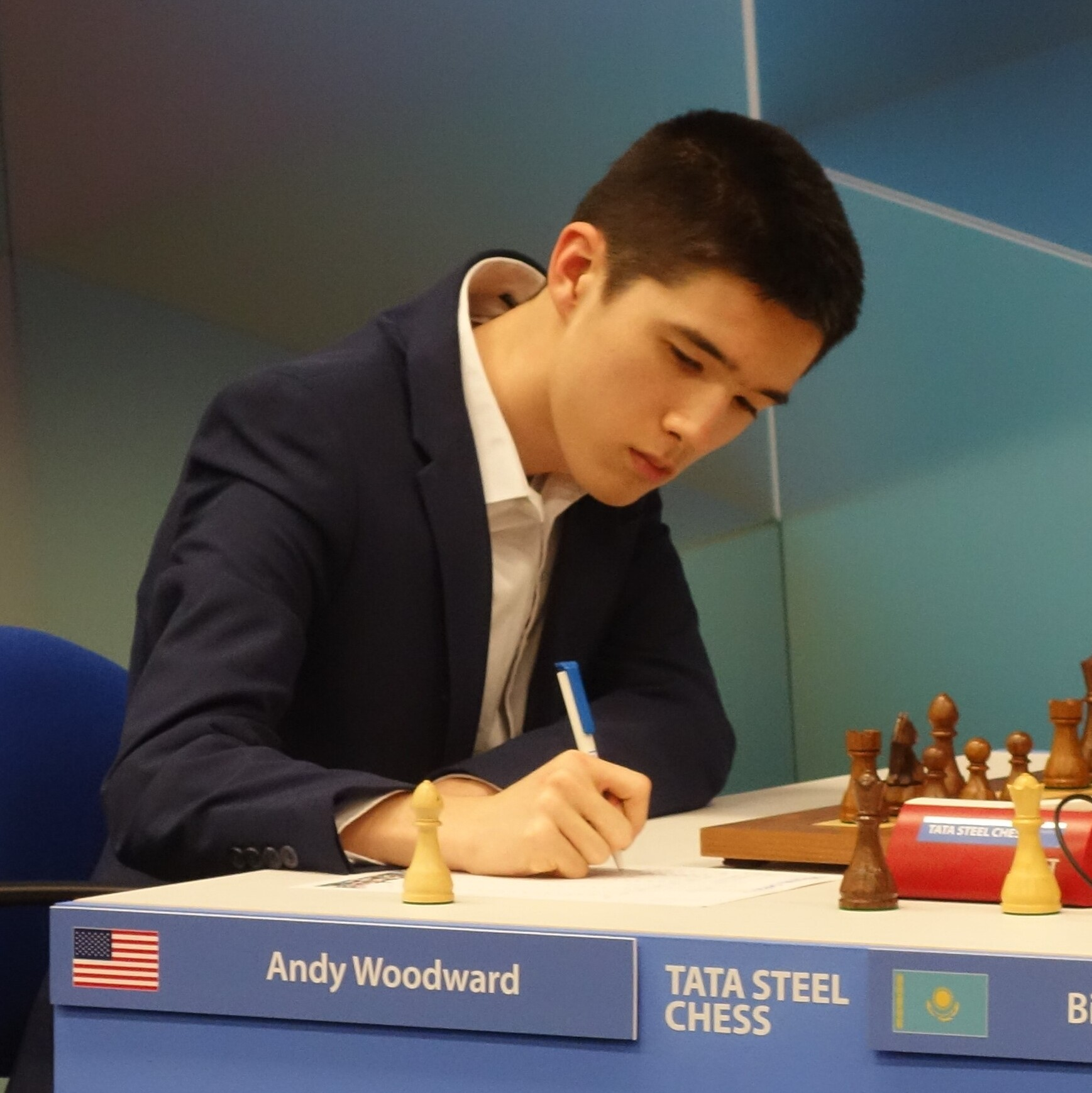
- Woodward in 2026

Personal information
- Born: May 2, 2010 (age 16) Frisco, Texas, U.S.

Chess career
- Country: United States
- Title: Grandmaster (2024)
- FIDE rating: 2619 (October 2026)
- Peak rating: 2640 (August 2026)
- Peak ranking: No. 81 (August 2026)

Andy Austin Woodward (born 2010) is an American chess grandmaster and prodigy.

== Chess career ==
Woodward earned his first IM norm in the 2021 North American Junior Championship in Charlotte, North Carolina. He earned four more IM norms in Novi Sad, Serbia.

In October 2022, Woodward earned his first GM norm at the 1000GM Hollywood Masters with a score of 6.5/9, defeating grandmasters Illia Nyzhnyk and Gergely Kántor. Right before this, he made it into the knockout stage of the FIDE Fischer Random World Championship qualifiers as the youngest player.

In January 2023, Woodward was named to the age 11 section of the All-America Chess Team. He has been part of the All-America Chess Team since 2020.

In April 2023, Woodward earned his second GM norm at the Vezerkepzo GM April tournament with a score of 7.0/9, defeating GM Kaido Külaots and GM Valeriy Neverov.

In September 2023, Woodward defeated Hans Niemann during their encounter in the World Junior Chess Championship.

In December 2023, Woodward won the 17th Annual SPICE (Susan Polgar Institute for Chess Excellence) Cup ahead of Aram Hakobyan, Yasser Quesada, and Safal Bora. Woodward's performance exceeded the 2600 performance rating requirement needed for a grandmaster norm, however did not qualify due to a lack of foreign opponents.

In January 2024, Woodward made it to the finals of the chess.com Puzzle World Championship, but lost to defending champion Ray Robson. They met again in the final in 2025, and this time Woodward prevailed.

On January 30, 2024, Woodward earned his final GM norm at the Jeddah International Chess Festival with a score of 6.0/9 after losing his first two rounds against Yağız Kaan Erdoğmuş and Volodar Murzin. With this, he became one of the youngest in history to qualify for the title by fulfilling the requirements for the title at the age of 13 years, 8 months, and 28 days. He is also the second youngest grandmaster in U.S. history, only behind Abhimanyu Mishra.

Woodward tied for first in the Saint Louis Summer Classic tournament in May 2024. He tied for first again in the Universal Open tournament in June. A couple of weeks later, he won the Philadelphia International chess tournament.

In July 2025, Woodward took first place at the 2025 US Junior Chess Championship. Woodward won with a score of 6.5/9, ahead of nine other players with a performance rating of 2646. By winning, Woodward qualified for the 2025 U.S. Chess Championship, his first appearance at the competition.

Following up his first place performance in the US Junior Chess Championship, in September 2025, Woodward tied for fifth place in the FIDE Grand Swiss 2025, beating notable 2700+ Grandmasters such as Levon Aronian, Yu Yangyi, and Parham Maghsoodloo. Woodward finished 7.0/11, winning four games, with his only loss coming to former world blitz champion Maxime Vachier-Lagrave and a overall tournament performance rating of 2784.

He won the Challengers section of the Tata Steel Chess Tournament 2026 with a score of 10/13, winning nine games while only losing two.

On December 23, 2025, Woodward set a record for the highest ever Lichess bullet rating with a Bullet ELO of 3601. On February 14, 2026, Woodward set a record for the highest ever chess.com Bullet rating with a Bullet ELO of 3582.

In May 2026, Woodward finished 6th at the TePe Sigeman Chess Tournament with a score of 3/7, winning one game and losing two. On May 9, he won his first Chess.com Bullet Brawl title. On June 19, Woodward won the Chess.com Hyperbullet Championship 2026, beating two-time defending champion Andrew Tang in the grand final.
