= Bojan Maksimović =

Bosnian-Serbian chess grandmaster (born 2002)

Personal information
- Born: November 6, 2002 (age 24) Banja Luka, Bosnia and Herzegovina

Chess career
- Country: Bosnia and Herzegovina (until 2026); Serbia (since 2026)
- Title: Grandmaster (2025)
- FIDE rating: 2524 (November 2026)
- Peak rating: 2537 (July 2026)

Bojan Maksimović is a Bosnian-Serbian chess grandmaster. He became Banja Luka's youngest FIDE Master in March 2017 at the age of 14 years, 6 months and 9 days, and their youngest International Master in April 2021 at the age of 18 years, 5 months and 15 days.

== Chess career ==
In July 2024, he won the Uros Dinic Memorial Rapid Rating with a score of 7.5/9, beating Kushagra Mohan on tiebreaks.

In February 2025, he won the 5th Jajce Open, beating grandmaster Danilo Milanović on tiebreak scores.

In August 2025, he earned his final GM norm at a tournament in Spilimbergo, where he earned 5 wins and 4 draws. His opponents included four grandmasters. He became Banja Luka's third grandmaster, after Milan Vukić and Enver Bukić, who earned their titles in 1974 and 1976, respectively.

He qualified for the Chess World Cup 2025 through one of the Olympiad qualifier spots. He caused an upset by defeating grandmaster Emre Can in the first round, though was defeated by Anish Giri in the second round.

In June 2026, he won the Serbian Chess Championship with one round to spare, finishing with a score of 6.5/9.
