= Heskiel Ndahangwapo =

Namibian chess player (born 2000)

Personal information
- Born: 2000 (age 25–26) Endola, Namibia

Chess career
- Country: Namibia
- Title: FIDE Master (2025)
- Peak rating: 2128 (August 2026)

Heskiel Ndahangwapo is a Namibian chess player.

== Chess career ==
In September 2024, he played for Namibia on board 1 in the 45th Chess Olympiad. He scored 5.5/9 across his games and held a draw against Mariano Ortega Amarelle, who was rated over 400 points higher.

He played in the Chess World Cup 2025 after earning one of the Olympiad qualifier spots, where he was defeated by Vladislav Artemiev in the first round.
