= Barbadian Chess Championship =

Chess championship organized by the Barbados Chess Federation since 1983

The Barbadian National Chess Championship has been organized by the Barbados Chess Federation since 1983. Previously it was organized by the Barbados Chess Club. A separate national championship for women was first held in 1981.

== Open championship winners ==
Year	Champion
1924	Sidney Inniss
1925	Sidney Inniss
1926	Sidney Inniss
1927	Charles Gilkes
1928	W. Stoute
1929	Charles Gilkes
1930	Sidney Inniss
1931	Sidney Inniss
1932	Charles Gilkes
1933	Charles Gilkes
1934	Charles Gilkes
1935	H. Walton
1936	Charles Gilkes
1937	H. Walton
1938	Charles Gilkes
1939	H. Walton
1940	H. Walton
1941	Charles Gilkes
1942	H. Walton
1943	H. Walton
1944	Charles Gilkes
1945	H. Walton
1946	H. Walton
1947	H. Walton
1948	Charles Gilkes
1949	C. Beasley
1950	Charles Gilkes
1967	George Trotman, Charles Gilkes
1976	Philip Corbin
1977	T. Morton, Philip Corbin
1978	Ronald Moseley
1979	Philip Corbin
1980	Philip Corbin
1981	David Dawson
1982	Peter Dawson
1983	Ron Buckmire
1984	Ron Buckmire
1985	Ron Buckmire
1986	Kevin Denny
1987	Philip Corbin
1988	Kevin Denny
1990	Philip Corbin
1991	Kevin Denny
1992	Kevin Denny
1993	Kevin Denny
1994	Kevin Denny
1995	Kevin Denny
1996	Kevin Denny
1997	Philip Corbin
1998	Kevin Denny
1999	Kevin Denny
2000	Kevin Denny
2001	Kevin Denny
2002	Ricardo Szmetan
2003	Delisle Warner
2004	Kevin Denny
2005	Delisle Warner
2006	Terry Farley
2007	Delisle Warner
2008	Kevin Denny
2009	Martyn Del Castilho
2010	Martyn Del Castilho
2011	Martyn Del Castilho
2012	Martyn Del Castilho
2013	Orlando Husbands
2014	Yu Tien Poon
2015	Yu Tien Poon
2016	Martyn Del Castilho
2017	Martyn Del Castilho
2018	Orlando Husbands
2019	Orlando Husbands
2020	Orlando Husbands
2022	Martyn Del Castilho
2023	Orlando Husbands
2024	Martyn Del Castilho
2025	Martyn Del Castilho
2026	Martyn Del Castilho

== Women's championship winners ==
Year	Champion
1981	Margaret Prince
1982	Margaret Prince
1983	Margaret Prince
1992	Margaret Prince
1997	Margaret Prince
2002	Rashida Corbin
2003	Rashida Corbin
2004	Teresa Howell
2006	Corrine Howard
2007	Corrine Howard
2008	Rashida Corbin
2011	Sheena Ramsay
2012	Katrina Blackman
2013	Donna Murray
2014	Katrina Blackman
2015	Gabriela Cumberbatch
2016	Katrina Blackman
2017	Katrina Blackman
2018	Julissa Figueroa
