= Ilan Schnaider =

Argentine chess player (born 2011)

Personal information
- Born: February 8, 2011 (age 15) Palermo, Buenos Aires

Chess career
- Country: Argentina
- Title: International Master (2024)
- FIDE rating: 2443 (September 2026)
- Peak rating: 2461 (October 2026)

Ilan Schnaider is an Argentine chess player.

== Chess career ==
In March 2019, he was the world's highest-rated under-8 player, and has been considered one of Argentina's most promising young players alongside Faustino Oro.

He became an International Master in August 2024, notably achieving the title without a personal coach.

He played in the Chess World Cup 2025, where he was defeated by Aleksandar Inđić in the first round.

In December 2025, he defeated grandmaster Julio Granda in the sixth round of the Magistral Szmetan-Giardelli in 22 moves.
