= Pranav V =

Indian chess grandmaster (born 2006)

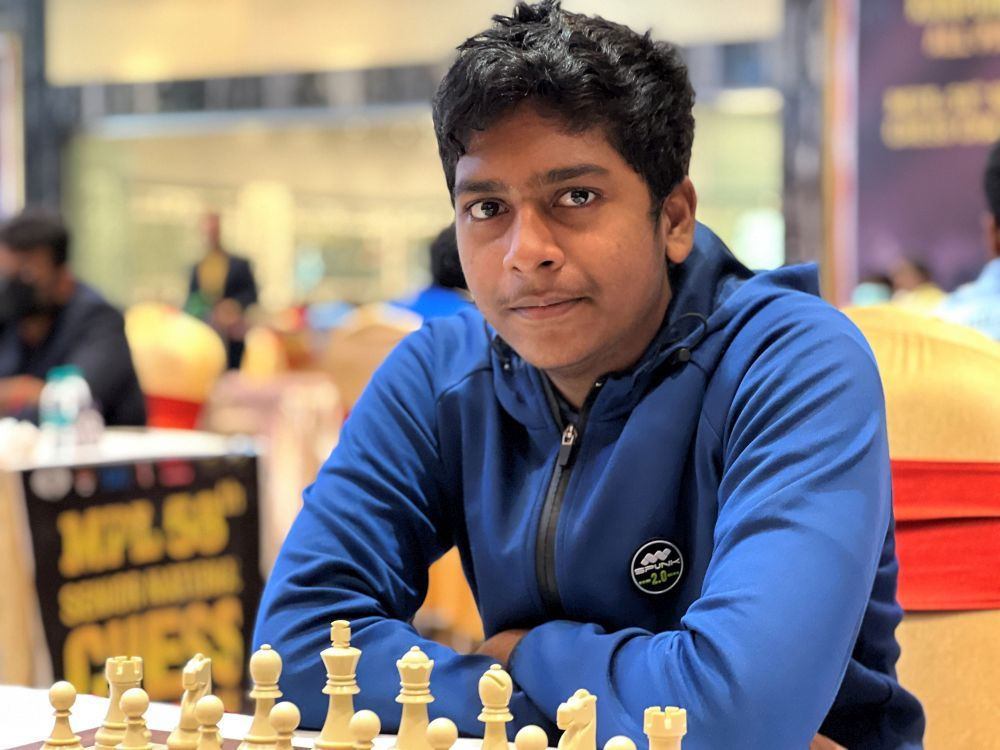
- Pranav in 2022

Personal information
- Born: 13 October 2006 (age 20) Bengaluru, Karnataka, India

Chess career
- Country: India
- Title: Grandmaster (2022)
- FIDE rating: 2677 (October 2026)
- Peak rating: 2679 (November 2026)
- Ranking: No. 43 (October 2026)
- Peak ranking: No. 41 (September 2026)

Pranav Venkatesh (born 13 October 2006) is an Indian chess grandmaster and the 2025 World Junior Chess Champion.

== Chess career ==
Pranav began playing chess at the age of 6, and had several coaches including Visweswaran Kameswaran. He obtained his first two GM norms at the Serbia Open in 2021 and in the Vezerkepzo GM tournament in Budapest, Hungary in June 2022.

In August 2022, Pranav obtained his final norm by winning the Limpedea Open in Baia Mare, Romania championship, becoming the 75th grandmaster from India and the 27th grandmaster from the state of Tamil Nadu.

In October 2022, he played for India in the World U-16 Youth Olympiad (alongside Pranesh M, Harshad S, Rohit S, Mrittika Mallick, and Boramanikar Tanisha S), alongside competing in the Magnus Carlsen Academy Challenge, winning both events. He later won chess24's Challengers Chess Tour by defeating Raunak Sadhwani in the final round.

In October 2023, he competed in the 38th edition of the European Chess Club Cup with Offerspill Sjakklub. Led by the world no.1 Magnus Carlsen, Offerspill Sjakklubb triumphed, after scoring a decisive last-round victory against Asnieres – Le Grand Echiquier (France). Pranav's overall performance of 5/7, including victories against Jorden van Foreest and Grigoriy Oparin in the last two rounds, earned him a tweet from Magnus Carlsen - "Pranav is buddy and buddy is Pranav".

In January 2024, Pranav competed in the fifth edition of the Puzzles World Championships, hosted by chess.com, finishing 4th place overall. However, he produced the strongest resistance to eventual (5-time) winner Ray Robson, achieving a score of 3-5 sets with an aggregate puzzle score of 416–430.

In November 2024, Pranav won the Challengers section of Chennai Grand Masters and qualified to compete in main section of the event in 2025.

Pranav won two golds in the Under-18 Open Rapid, scoring 9.5/11, and Under-18 Open Blitz, scoring 19.5/22, section at the FIDE World Youth Rapid and Blitz Championship held in hotel Terme Čatež, Brežice, Slovenia from 13 to 17 December 2024. Only the Dutch IM Eline Roebers and one other player could win a blitz game against Pranav.

Pranav won the World Junior Chess Championship held at Petrovac, Budva in Montenegro on 7 March 2025 with a score of 9/11. He became the fourth Indian to win the World Junior title after Viswanathan Anand in 1987, Pentala Harikrishna in 2004, and Abhijeet Gupta in 2008.
