= Akar Ali Salih Salih =

Iraqi chess player (born 1990)

Personal information
- Born: March 11, 1990 (age 36)

Chess career
- Country: Iraq
- Title: FIDE Master (2011)
- Peak rating: 2359 (May 2015)

Akar Ali Salih Salih (born March 11, 1990) is an Iraqi chess player. He was awarded the title of FIDE Master in 2011.

== Chess career ==
He has represented Iraq in a number of Chess Olympiads, including 2012 (4/9 on board four), 2014 (3½/11 on board one) and 2016 (4/9 on board three).

He qualified for the Chess World Cup 2021, where he was defeated 2–0 by Alexander Onischuk in the first round.

He qualified for the Chess World Cup 2025, where he was defeated 2–0 by Dmitrij Kollars in the first round.
