= Farai Mandizha =

Zimbabwean chess player (born 1985)

Personal information
- Born: February 14, 1985 (age 41) Harare, Zimbabwe

Chess career
- Country: Zimbabwe
- Title: International Master (2012)
- Peak rating: 2406 (December 2017)

Farai Mandizha is a Zimbabwean chess player.

== Chess career ==
He played for Zimbabwe in the 40th, 41st, and 45th Chess Olympiads.

He is based in the United States, and has been a coach of the Hunter College Campus Schools in New York and Cedar Hill Prep School in New Jersey.

He earned his second GM norm at the 2017 World Open Chess Championship with a score of 6/9.

He was chosen by the Zimbabwean Chess Federation to compete in the Chess World Cup 2025. He was defeated through a walkover in his match against Bassem Amin.
