= Daniel Dardha =

Belgian chess grandmaster (born 2005)

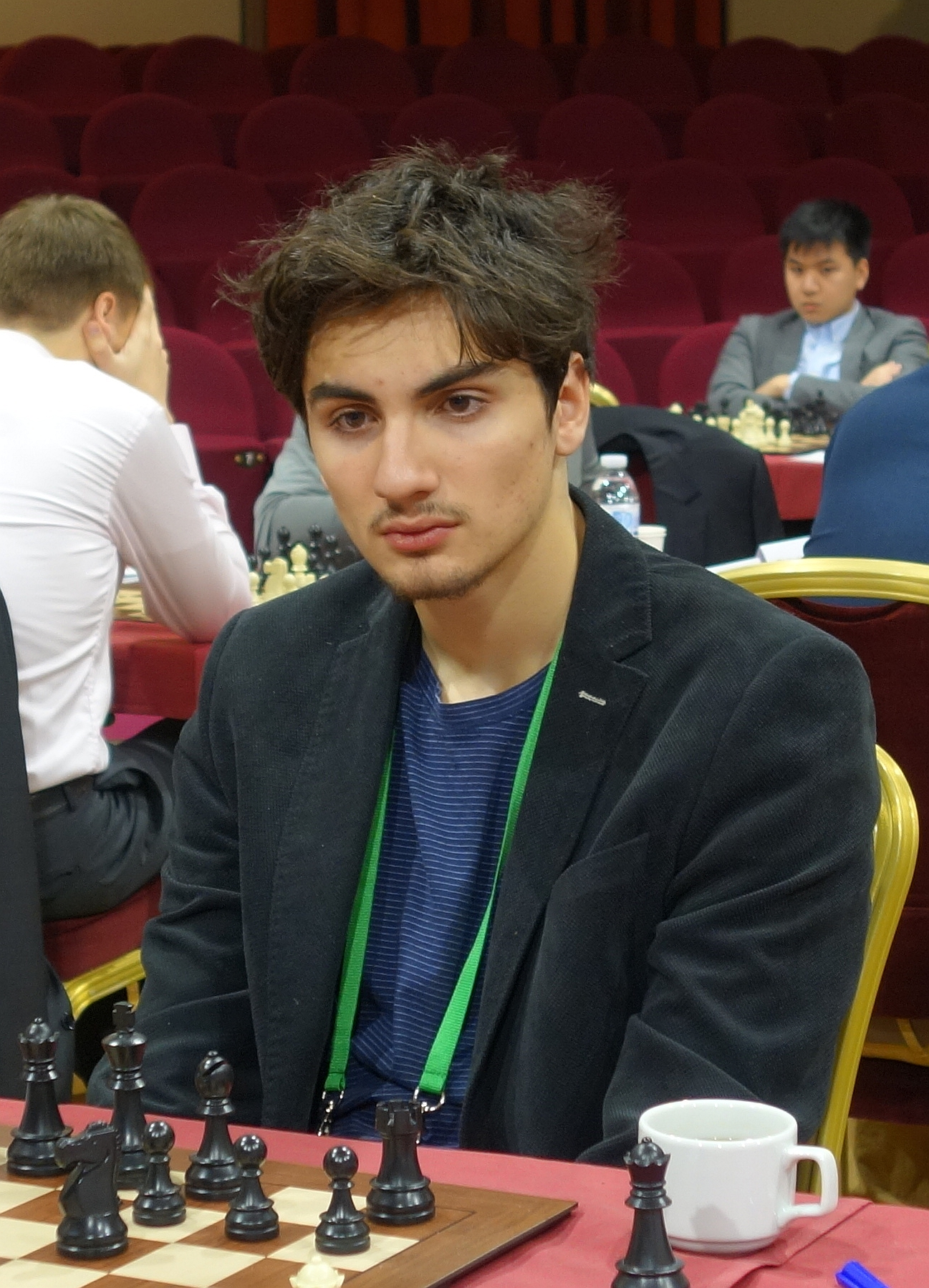
- Dardha in 2023

Personal information
- Born: 1 October 2005 (age 20) Mortsel, Belgium

Chess career
- Country: Belgium
- Title: Grandmaster (2021)
- FIDE rating: 2606 (July 2026)
- Peak rating: 2665 (March 2025)
- Peak ranking: No. 58 (March 2025)

Daniel Dardha (born 1 October 2005) is a Belgian chess grandmaster. He won the Belgian Chess Championship in 2019 at age 13, becoming the youngest player to do so.

== Chess career ==
In 2017, aged 12, he won the U-14 Blitz Chess Championship. He earned his International Master title in 2019, shortly after winning the Belgian Chess Championship. He earned his Grandmaster title in 2021 after winning the Belgian Chess Championship for the second time, becoming Belgium's youngest ever Grandmaster at age 15.

He won the Belgian Chess Championship for the third time in 2022.

He did not defend his title in 2023, playing instead in the Chess World Cup 2023. He defeated Kevin Goh Wei Ming in the first round, but was defeated by Vincent Keymer in the second round.

In May 2024, he won the Sardinia World Chess Festival Open A on tiebreaks, tying with three other players Kirill Shevchenko, Volodar Murzin and Jorden van Foreest with 7/9.

He won the Belgian Chess Championship for the fourth time in 2024.

In November 2024, he competed in the European Individual Chess Championship and finished at second place, scoring 8½/11 (+6–0=5) and qualifying for the Chess World Cup 2025.

In November 2025, at the Chess World Cup 2025 he advanced to the third round after eliminating International Master Bành Gia Huy in the first round and Grigoriy Oparin in the second round, but was defeated by Pentala Harikrishna in the third round.

He won the Belgian Chess Championship for the fifth time in 2026.

== Personal life ==
Dardha was born on 1 October 2005 in Mortsel, Belgium. His father, Arben Dardha, who became U-20 Albanian Champion at age 16, is a FIDE Master and, as of 2019, Daniel's coach. (Daniel is also intermittently coached by Ivan Sokolov.) Dardha's grandfather, Bardhyl Dardha, coached the Tomori chess club in Berat, Albania, as well as his son. At age 82, he was still active in online chess.
