= Jose Gabriel Cardoso Cardoso =

Colombian chess grandmaster (born 2004)

Personal information
- Born: October 10, 2004 (age 21)

Chess career
- Country: Colombia
- Title: Grandmaster (2022)
- FIDE rating: 2510 (July 2026)
- Peak rating: 2543 (March 2026)
Medal record
Men's chess
Representing Colombia
Central American and Caribbean Games
Gold medal – first place	2023 San Salvador	Second blitz board

Jose Gabriel Cardoso Cardoso is a Colombian chess grandmaster.

== Chess career ==
In December 2020, he finished in third place in the Open U16 section of the FIDE World Cadets & Youth Rapid Championships.

In June 2023, he won the gold medal for the board 2 blitz open section in the chess event of the XXIV Central American and Caribbean Games.

In April 2025, he played for the University of Texas Rio Grande Valley in the President's Cup. His team tied for first place but was ranked second after tiebreak scores. He was the highest scorer for his team.

In May 2025, he finished in fourth place at the American Continental Chess Championship, securing the final qualification spot for the Chess World Cup 2025. At the World Cup, he was defeated by Baadur Jobava in the first round.
