= Orlando Husbands =

Barbadian chess player (born 1997)

Personal information
- Born: February 26, 1997 (age 29)

Chess career
- Country: Barbados
- Title: International Master (2017)
- Peak rating: 2374 (December 2021)

Orlando Husbands is a Barbadian chess player. He is the highest-rated player of his country and was the national champion in 2013.

== Chess career ==
In November 2023, he finished eighth after tiebreaks at the Panama Chess Open, which featured a field included eight grandmasters.

In April 2024, he got off to a strong start in the Heroes Day Masters. He won his first three games, including one against Venezuelan champion Félix Ynojosa.

In April 2025, he won the Subzone 2.3.3 Open tournament, earning the right to play in the Chess World Cup 2025. This occurred after his compatriot Hannah Wilson also played in the Women's World Cup that same year. At the event, he was defeated by Frederik Svane in the first round 2–0, who beat World Champion Gukesh Dommaraju in the third round 1.5-0.5 and lost to the future winner Javokhir Sindarov in the fifth round 0.5-1.5.
