= Philip Corbin =

Barbadian chess player (born 1957)

Personal information
- Born: August 1, 1957 (age 68)

Chess career
- Country: Barbados
- Title: FIDE Master (2000)
- FIDE rating: 2005 (January 2020)
- Peak rating: 2315 (January 1991)

Philip Corbin (born 1957) is a Barbadian FIDE Master chess player.

Corbin is a seven-time champion of Barbados and has represented Barbados in eleven Chess Olympiads from 1986 through 2008, playing first board in 1986, 1990, 1998, and 2000.

He is known for using the Elephant Gambit when playing with the black pieces, most notably in his 2006 simultaneous exhibition win over English GM Nigel Short. He also plays the Budapest Gambit and the Scandinavian Defense as black. In a television interview Corbin said that he attempts to play chess in an innovative and entertaining style and referred to his playing style as "Calypso Chess."

== Book ==
- Calypso Chess: The Entertaining Chess Games (1970-2010) of Dr. Philip Corbin, FIDE Master, Barbados Paperback – 20 Aug. 2011
