= Raja Rithvik R =

Indian chess grandmaster (born 2004)

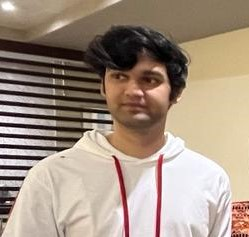

Personal information
- Born: 4 May 2004 (age 22) Hyderabad, India

Chess career
- Country: India
- Title: Grandmaster (2022)
- FIDE rating: 2521 (July 2026)
- Peak rating: 2557 (June 2025)

Raja Rithvik Rajavaram is an Indian chess grandmaster. He became a grandmaster at the age of 17.

== Career ==
In June 2018, he defeated grandmaster Valeriy Neverov (who was rated 200 points higher) in an upset in the fifth round of the 11th Mumbai Mayor's International Chess Tournament.

In August 2021, he achieved his second GM norm after defeating grandmaster Valentina Gunina at the Skalica Chess Festival and finishing in second place in the event.

In September 2021, he completed all of the requirements for the Grandmaster title by surpassing the 2500 rating mark at the Vezerkepzo GM Tournament in Budapest. He became India's 70th Grandmaster.

In December 2022, he won the Chessable Sunway Sitges Blitz tournament with an undefeated score of 8.5/9.

In January 2023, he was leading the Rilton Cup after the fifth round.

In April 2023, he was a joint leader after the fifth round of the Chessable Sunway Formentera.

In March 2024, he won the silver medal in the Indian National Blitz Chess Championship, finishing behind Diptayan Ghosh in a field of over 220 players.

== Personal life ==
Raja Rithvik's parents are Srinivasa Rao Rajavaram, an Electrical Engineer, and Deepika. Srinivasa Rao is originally from Manthani in the combined Karimnagar district of Telangana. Deepika was working as a lecturer but left her job to support Raja Rithvik's chess journey. Rithvik spent his formative years in Warangal. Raja Rithvik is an engineering student at KL University in Hyderabad.
