= Felix Blohberger =

Austrian chess grandmaster (born 2002)

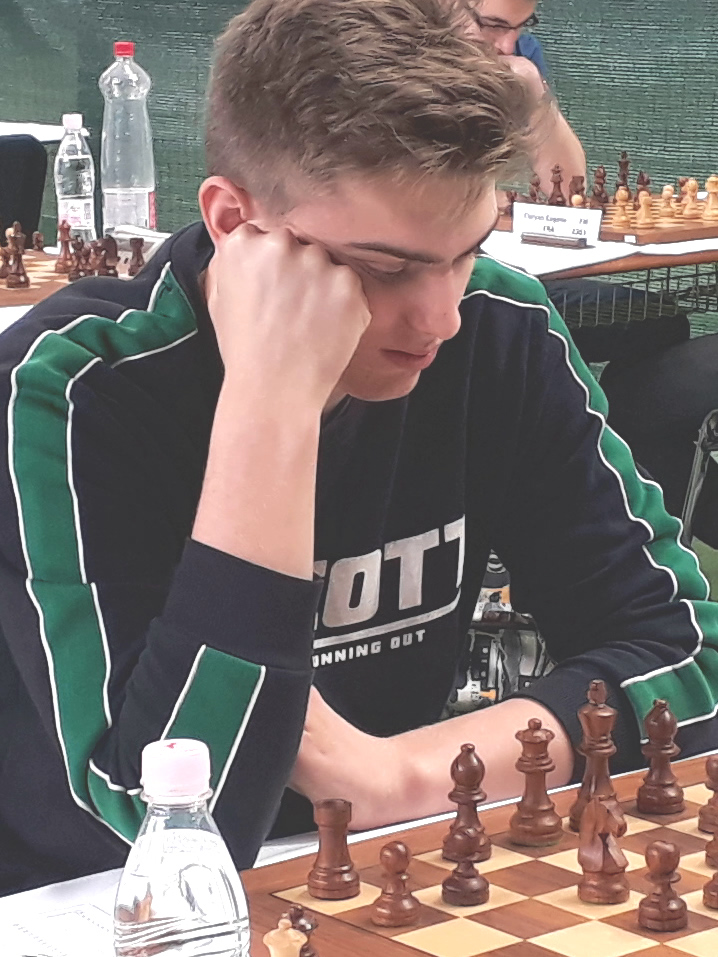
- Blohberger in 2019

Personal information
- Born: 20 August 2002 (age 23) Vienna, Austria

Chess career
- Country: Austria
- Title: Grandmaster (2022)
- FIDE rating: 2560 (August 2026)
- Peak rating: 2560 (July 2026)

Felix Blohberger (born 20 August 2002) is an Austrian chess grandmaster.

== Career ==
Blohberger was born in Vienna on 20 August 2002. He began playing chess at the age of five. He became a FIDE master in 2016, an international master in 2018, and a grandmaster in 2022.

He won the Austrian Chess Championship in 2022.

He played in the Chess World Cup 2023, where he was defeated in the first round by Dimitrios Mastrovasilis in blitz tiebreaks.

He played in the Chess World Cup 2025, where he defeated Constantin Lupulescu in the first round, but was defeated in the second round by Yu Yangyi in blitz tiebreaks.

He has a YouTube channel, on which he has described the difficulties involved in being a chess professional in Europe.

== Notable tournaments ==
Tournament Name	Year	ELO	Place	Points
28th EY Open U16 2018 (Riga, Latvia)	2018	2427	1	2.5
Prague International Open (Prague, Czech Republic)	2021	2475	2	7.0
Vienna GM 2021 (Vienna, Austria)	2021	2490	2	6.5
