= Ahmad Ahmadzada =

Azerbaijani chess grandmaster (born 2004)

- Ahmadzada in 2026

Personal information
- Born: December 13, 2004 (age 21) Baku, Azerbaijan

Chess career
- Country: Azerbaijan
- Title: Grandmaster (2023)
- FIDE rating: 2543 (September 2026)
- Peak rating: 2564 (April 2025)

Ahmad Ahmadzada (born 2004) is an Azerbaijani chess player who holds the title of Grandmaster.

== Chess career ==
In August 2025, Ahmadzada won the Vugar Gashimov Open, finishing on 8/9.

Ahmadzada qualified to play in the Chess World Cup 2025. He was defeated by Surya Shekhar Ganguly in the first round.
