= Paul Velten =

French chess grandmaster (born 1993)

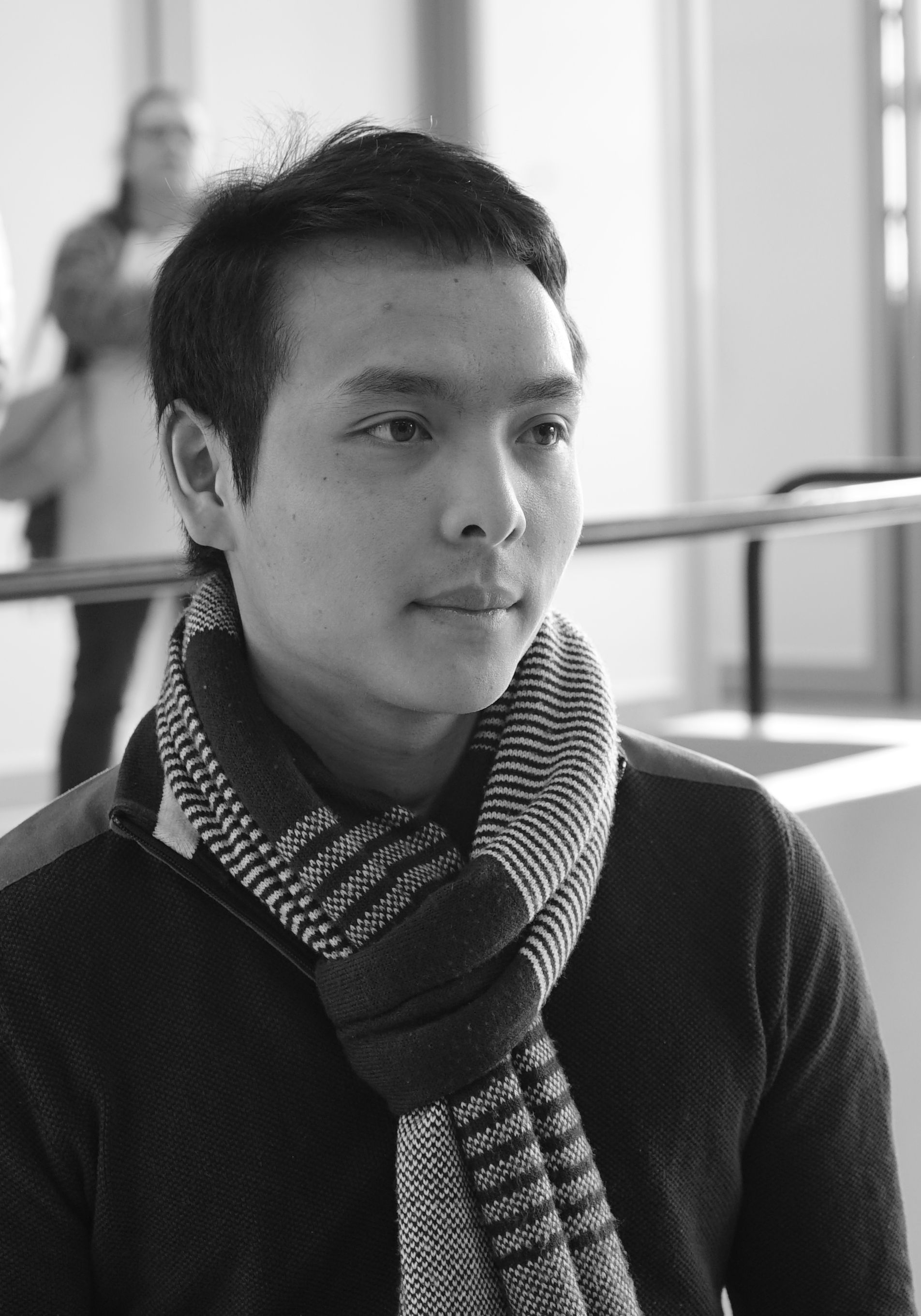
- Velten in 2020

Personal information
- Born: August 10, 1993 (age 33) Hanoi, Vietnam

Chess career
- Country: France
- Title: Grandmaster (2018)
- FIDE rating: 2482 (November 2026)
- Peak rating: 2542 (May 2025)

Paul Velten is a French chess grandmaster.

== Chess career ==
In June 2015, he scored his first GM norm at the French Team Championships, where he notably played with the black pieces in each game. His next norms were at the Top 12 French Team Championships in June 2016 and the Bundesliga Sued in February 2018.

In August 2018, Velten, Antoine Favarel, and their student Antoine Bournel competed in the Wine Open in Hourtin, near Bordeaux. They helped Bournel achieve the win in the tournament.

In June 2020, he tied for 5th place at the online Lichess Quarantine Charity Tournament.

In February 2023, he represented the Chalonnais Exchequer chess club at the Cappelle-la-Grande Open tournament, where he finished 9th out of a field of 30.

He played in the Chess World Cup 2025, where he was defeated by Vladislav Kovalev in the first round.
