= Bành Gia Huy =

Vietnamese chess player (born 2009)

Personal information
- Born: May 25, 2009 (age 17) Hanoi, Vietnam

Chess career
- Country: Vietnam
- Title: International Master (2024)
- FIDE rating: 2484 (October 2026)
- Peak rating: 2484 (October 2026)

Bành Gia Huy is a Vietnamese chess player.

== Chess career ==
In March 2024, he won the Vietnamese Chess Championship, earning the right to represent the country in the 45th Chess Olympiad.

In July 2025, he finished in second place at the Biel Chess Festival Swiss Rapid Chess960 Championship with a score of 6/7.

He played in the Chess World Cup 2025 after earning one of the Olympiad qualifier spots, where he was defeated by Daniel Dardha in the first round.

In November 2025, he won the classical chess portion of the Asian Youth Chess Championship.
