= Kevin Joel Cori Quispe =

Peruvian-Mexican chess grandmaster (born 1999)

Personal information
- Born: August 2, 1999 (age 27) Lima, Peru

Chess career
- Country: Peru (until 2024); Mexico (since 2024)
- Title: Grandmaster (2018)
- FIDE rating: 2440 (September 2026)
- Peak rating: 2507 (September 2018)

Kevin Joel Cori Quispe is a Peruvian chess grandmaster who plays for Mexico.

== Chess career ==
In April 2022, he tied for second place with Pablo Salinas Herrera and Luis Fernando Ibarra Chami in the Mexico Open.

In October 2022, he played for the Tecnológico de Monterrey Puebla team in the CONADEIP National Championship, which finished in third place. Cori finished first in the individual rapid tournament.

He qualified for the Chess World Cup 2025 through one of the Olympiad spots. He was defeated by Pouya Idani in the first round.

== Personal life ==
Off the chessboard, he works as a software engineer. He is not related to fellow Peruvian chess players Jorge Cori and Deysi Cori.
