= Dylan Isidro Berdayes Ason =

Cuban chess grandmaster (born 1998)

Personal information
- Born: May 15, 1998 (age 28) Havana, Cuba

Chess career
- Country: Cuba
- Title: Grandmaster (2023)
- FIDE rating: 2477 (July 2026)
- Peak rating: 2519 (June 2024)

Dylan Isidro Berdayes Ason is a Cuban chess grandmaster.

== Chess career ==
In July 2022, he won the 22nd Sant Marti Open ahead of Hipolito Asis Gargatagli and Aronyak Ghosh due to better tiebreaks.

In August 2023, he tied for first place in the 47th Badalona City Open, though finished third after tiebreaks.

In November 2023, he played for Cuba in the Che International Chess Festival, where he was the team's second highest scorer, behind Elier Miranda Mesa.
