= Ivan Zemlyanskii =

Russian chess grandmaster (born 2010)

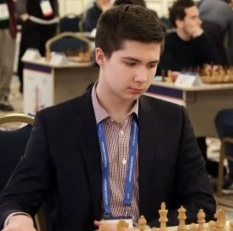
- Zemlyanskii in 2025

Personal information
- Born: 31 August 2010 (age 15) Tyumen, Russia

Chess career
- Country: Russia (until 2022); FIDE (since 2022)
- Title: Grandmaster (2024)
- FIDE rating: 2594 (July 2026)
- Peak rating: 2599 (July 2025)

Ivan Yevgenyevich Zemlyanskii (Russian: Иван Евгеньевич Землянский; born 31 August 2010) is a Russian chess grandmaster.

== Chess career ==
In May 2024, he scored his final GM norm at the 8th round of the Sharjah Masters to become the youngest Russian grandmaster. He ultimately finished the tournament in 11th place after defeating Leon Luke Mendonca in the final round.

In July 2024, he finished second in the U13 section of the ChessKid Youth Championship 2024.

In August 2024, his Grandmaster title was finalized, making him the second youngest grandmaster at the time.
