= David Silva (chess player) =

Angolan chess player (born 1998)

Personal information
- Born: 1998 (age 27–28)

Chess career
- Country: Angola
- Title: International Master (2015)
- Peak rating: 2392 (January 2024)

David Silva is an Angolan chess player.

== Chess career ==
In July 2018, he played in the CIV Invitational Tournament, which held a rapid and a blitz portion. He finished in 7th place in the rapid section and was the runner-up of the blitz section.

In March 2024, he finished in 4th place at the African Chess Championship.

He qualified for the Chess World Cup 2025 through one of the Olympiad qualifier spots. He was defeated by David Antón Guijarro in the first round.
