= Harshavardhan G. B. =

Indian chess grandmaster (born 2003)

Personal information
- Born: November 15, 2003 (age 22) Chennai, India

Chess career
- Country: India
- Title: Grandmaster (2026)
- FIDE rating: 2529 (October 2026)
- Peak rating: 2542 (November 2026)

Harshavardhan Gopalakrishnan B. is an Indian chess grandmaster.

== Chess career ==
In November 2022, he won the Asian Junior Chess Championship with an unbeaten score of 7/9, also earning a GM norm.

In December 2023, he won the gold medal in the Rapid Open section of the Western Asian Junior Chess Championships.

In March 2024, he shared second place with grandmasters Bharath Subramaniyam H and G. Akash at the ChessOrg Festival Bad Woerishofen Open A.

In May 2025, he defeated grandmaster Tin Jingyao (who was rated over 150 points higher) in the first round of the Dubai Open.

In August 2025, he finished in second place in the Chess Hub MCF GM IM Invitational, where he suffered his only loss against the winner Yeoh Li Tian.

He qualified for the Chess World Cup 2025, where he was defeated by Mustafa Yılmaz in the first round.

In June 2026, he became India's 97th Grandmaster after scoring 6.5/9 at the 2nd Chola Chess GM Norm Round Robin Tournament, earning his final norm and crossing the 2500 rating mark at the same time.
