= Aronyak Ghosh =

Indian chess grandmaster (born 2003)

Personal information
- Born: December 6, 2003 (age 22) Kolkata, India

Chess career
- Country: India
- Title: Grandmaster (2026)
- FIDE rating: 2549 (July 2026)
- Peak rating: 2555 (November 2024)

Aronyak Ghosh (born 2003) is an Indian chess player who holds the title of Grandmaster.

== Chess career ==
In 2023, Ghosh finished third in the Indian Chess Championship.

In 2024, he won the Annemasse Masters on tiebreaks, earning his second GM-norm. He earned his first GM-norm finishing fourth in the Sants International Open in 2023.

Ghosh qualified to play in the Chess World Cup 2025. He caused an upset by defeating grandmaster Mateusz Bartel in the first round, though was eliminated by Levon Aronian in the second round.

At the Bangkok Chess Club Open 2026, Ghosh tied for first with 7/9, becoming India's 95th Grandmaster.
