= Safal Bora =

American chess grandmaster (born 1998)

Personal information
- Born: May 19, 1998 (age 28) Troy, Michigan

Chess career
- Country: United States
- Title: Grandmaster (2025)
- FIDE rating: 2511 (October 2026)
- Peak rating: 2511 (October 2026)

Safal Bora is an American chess grandmaster.

== Chess career ==
In March 2016, he earned his first GM norm at the Charlotte Chess Center GM norm tournament after winning his last three games of the event.

In November 2018, he played for the University of Michigan's team at the Ivy Chess Challenge, where the team finished in 3rd place.

In December 2023, he tied for second place with grandmasters Aram Hakobyan and Yasser Quesada at the SPICE Cup Chess Tournament.

In July 2024, he achieved his final GM norm at the NYC Chess Norms invitational tournament after defeating grandmaster Oliver Barbosa in the final round. He then surpassed the 2500 rating mark in December 2024, achieving the GM title.

== Personal life ==
He attended the University of Michigan for a bachelor of business administration and a bachelor of engineering. Off the chessboard, he works as a software engineer at Microsoft. Safal co-wrote a research paper while studying at the University of Michigan - https://msp.org/involve/2024/17-3/involve-v17-n3-p01-p.pdf, https://arxiv.org/abs/1705.06136
