= Pranesh M =

Indian chess grandmaster (born 2006)

- Pranesh in 2026

Personal information
- Born: August 26, 2006 (age 20) Karaikudi, Tamil Nadu, India

Chess career
- Country: India
- Title: Grandmaster (2023)
- FIDE rating: 2674 (October 2026)
- Peak rating: 2674 (September 2026)
- Ranking: No. 44 (October 2026)
- Peak ranking: No. 44 (August 2026)

Pranesh Munirethinam is an Indian chess grandmaster.

== Chess career ==
Pranesh is coached by R.B. Ramesh.

Pranesh obtained his first GM norm in the 18th Delhi GM Open 2020 by defeating Stanislav Bogdanovich, Adam Tukhaev, Visakh N. R., and Van Huy Nguyen, and drawing against Diptayan Ghosh, Sahaj Grover, Kirill Stupak, and Nodirbek Yakubboev.

In October 2022, Pranesh scored an upset win over Aravindh Chithambaram in the second round of the Asian Continental Chess Championship 2022.

In January 2023, Pranesh won the Rilton Cup held in Stockholm (the first international tournament of the 2023 FIDE Circuit) to become India's 79th Grandmaster.

In May 2023, Pranesh played for the Indian Yogis in the 2023 PRO Chess League.

In August 2025, Pranesh won the Challengers section at the 2025 Chennai Grand Masters, scoring 6½/10.
