= Siddharth Jagadeesh =

Singaporean chess grandmaster (born 2007)

Personal information
- Born: 2007 (age 18–19) Chandigarh, India

Chess career
- Country: Singapore
- Title: Grandmaster (2024)
- FIDE rating: 2513 (July 2026)
- Peak rating: 2525 (June 2024)

Siddharth Jagadeesh is a Singaporean chess grandmaster.

== Chess career ==
In March 2024, he tied for first place with Aravindh Chithambaram and Carlos Daniel Albornoz Cabrera at the La Roda Open. He ultimately finished the tournament in second place due to tiebreaks.

In May 2024, he scored his final GM norm at the Sharjah Masters after defeating Andrey Esipenko in the eighth round. With this, he became Singapore's youngest grandmaster, at the age of 17.

== Personal life ==
His father Jagadeesh Balakrishnan has contributed to a ChessBase India Foundation scholarship for Indian chess.
