= Bomo Kigigha =

Nigerian chess player (born 1982)

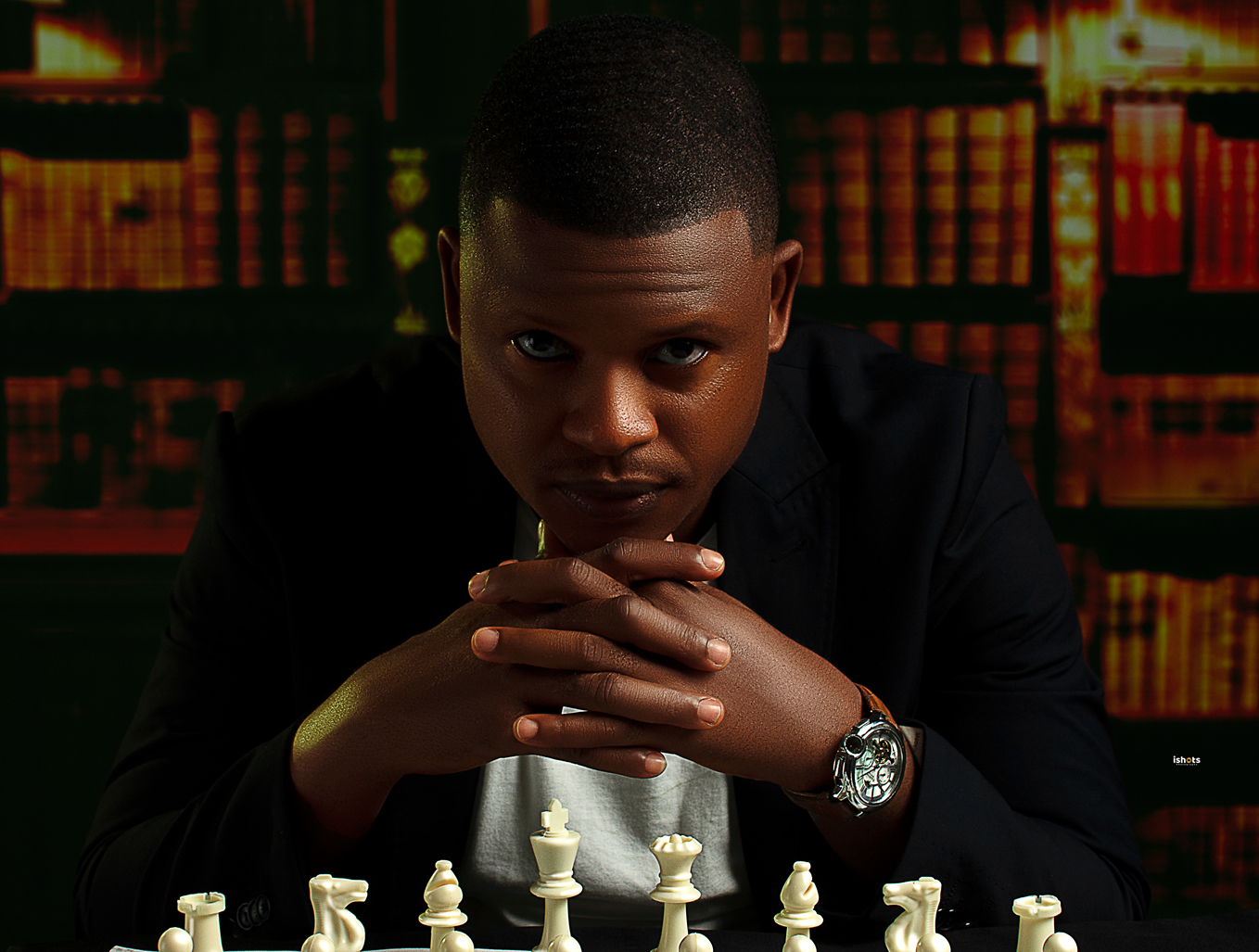

Personal information
- Born: Bomo Loveth Kigigha; 26 September 1982 (age 44) Bayelsa State, Nigeria

Chess career
- Country: Nigeria
- Title: FIDE Master (2016)
- Peak rating: 2363 (February 2016)

Bomo Lovet Kigigha (born 26 September, 1982) is a Nigerian FIDE Master and a 4 time Nigerian champion. He is Nigeria's fourth-highest rated player as of November, 2023 (behind Anwuli Daniel, Adebayo Adegboyega Joel, and Balogun Oluwafemi Daniel), with an Elo rating of 2251.

== Early life ==
Kigigha is the third child out of eight children of Sir and Lady Loveth Kigigha. He is the younger brother of Imino Kigigha who he drew inspiration from while growing up in Port Harcourt, Rivers State, Nigeria.

== Chess Career ==
After his Olympiad debut in 2008 in Dresden, Germany, Kigigha has participated six more times: 2012 in Istanbul, Turkey (Team Nigeria had a podium finish by winning category E), 2014 in Tromso, Norway, 2016 in Baku, Azerbaijan, 2018 in Batumi, Georgia, 2022 in Chennai, India, and 2024 in Budapest, Hungary.

In 2025, Kigigha competed in the FIDE World Cup in Goa, India, where he was defeated in the first round by German Grandmaster Alexander Donchenko, who later reached the quarterfinals.

== Chess Development Initiatives ==
Kigigha operates the C-4 Chess Academy in Yenagoa and has been involved in youth chess development programs. He partnered with the Promoting Qeeens Chess Club in Yenagoa to empower girls through chess initiatives.

Kigigha has mentored several chess prodigies including Goodness Ekunke, nicknamed "Baby-faced Assassin," who represented Africa in the Next Gen Cup organized by Chess.com, and Deborah Quickpen who represented Nigeria at the Chess Olympiad alongside him.
