= Martin Petrov (chess player) =

Bulgarian chess grandmaster (born 2000)

Personal information
- Born: October 3, 2000 (age 26) Sofia, Bulgaria

Chess career
- Country: Bulgaria
- Title: Grandmaster (2022)
- FIDE rating: 2533 (November 2026)
- Peak rating: 2556 (April 2022)

Martin Petrov is a Bulgarian chess grandmaster.

== Chess career ==
Petrov has represented Bulgaria in international team competitions since 2014, when he participated in the World Youth U16 Chess Olympiad. In 2015, he finished sixth in the Under-16 section of the European Youth Chess Championship in Poreč, Croatia.

In January 2019, Petrov shared first place at the 94th Hastings Masters, the 2018–19 edition of the tournament, scoring 7/10 alongside Daniel Gormally, Oleg Korneev, Šarūnas Šulskis, Alexander Cherniaev and Conor Murphy.

In March 2020, Petrov won the Bulgarian Individual Chess Championship in Sofia, scoring 7/9. This tournament also marked the first of his three norms towards the Grandmaster title. He achieved his second norm at the 30th Open International Chess Tournament in Kavala, Greece, in August 2021, where he finished third with 7/9. His third and final norm came at the Accedia Masters Classic in Sofia in October 2021, which he won undefeated with 7/9. The three tournaments accounted for the 27 games recorded in his FIDE Grandmaster title application.

In 2022, Petrov won the third stage of the Romanian Grand Prix, held in Miercurea Ciuc, Romania. He finished first with 6.5/9, ahead of six other players who scored the same number of points, placing first on tiebreaks. In the same year, he won the second Round Table Trainers and Students Chess Tournament. At the 38th Open de Cappelle-la-Grande in France, he scored 7/9, sharing the leading score with six other players and finishing third on tiebreaks.

In June 2022, Petrov finished third at the Târgu Mureș Open in Romania, having the highest tiebreak score among six players tied for third place.

Petrov won the Bulgarian Men's Individual Rapid Chess Championship in 2021, 2023 and 2025. He also won the Bulgarian Individual Classical Chess Championship in 2025, having previously won the title in 2020.

In February 2023, he finished fourth in the Bulgarian Individual Chess Championship, with 6/9 points, behind Kiril Georgiev, Nurgyul Salimova and Momchil Petkov.

Petrov has also won several international open tournaments in Bulgaria, including the Georgi Tringov Memorial in 2021, 2023, 2025 and 2026; the Primorsko Open in 2019 and 2021; and Shumen rapid chess tournaments in 2019, 2022 and 2025.

At the Balkan & Prishtina Open in June 2024, Petrov finished second overall with 6.5/9, behind Platon Galperin, and was the highest-placed player from a Balkan federation.

Petrov has represented Bulgaria at several Chess Olympiads. He was part of the Bulgarian team at the 42nd Chess Olympiad in Baku, Azerbaijan, in 2016, the 45th Chess Olympiad in Budapest, Hungary, in 2024, and the 46th Chess Olympiad in Samarkand, Uzbekistan, in 2026.

In 2025, Petrov qualified for the FIDE World Cup, held in Goa, India. He defeated Brazilian grandmaster Krikor Mekhitarian 1.5–0.5 in the first round before losing 0–2 to Indian grandmaster Arjun Erigaisi in the second round.
