= Yağız Kaan Erdoğmuş =

Turkish chess grandmaster (born 2011)

- Erdoğmuş at the 46th Chess Olympiad

Personal information
- Born: 3 June 2011 (age 15) Bursa, Turkey

Chess career
- Country: Turkey
- Title: Grandmaster (2024)
- FIDE rating: 2716 (September 2026)
- Peak rating: 2731 (October 2026)
- Ranking: No. 26 (September 2026)
- Peak ranking: No. 17 (October 2026)

Yağız Kaan Erdoğmuş IPA: [jaˈɯz kaˈan ˈæɾdoːmuʃ] (born 3 June 2011) is a Turkish chess grandmaster. A chess prodigy, he was awarded the International Master title prior to turning 12, becoming the youngest individual from Turkey to achieve that title. In 2024, he became the fourth-youngest grandmaster in history at the time, and, later that year, the youngest player ever to reach a FIDE rating of 2600. Subsequently, in May 2026, he became the youngest player in history to reach a rating of 2700, besting the previous record by almost a year. Erdoğmuş was the youngest grandmaster in the world from April 2024 to May 2026, when Faustino Oro, who is two years and four months younger, claimed that title.

== Early life ==
Erdoğmuş was born in Bursa, Turkey to parents Gülsüm and Selahattin Erdoğmuş. Introduced to chess by his kindergarten teacher, he started playing the game at the age of 6.

== Chess career ==
In 2018, Erdoğmuş won the U-8 category at the 6th Çeşme International Open Chess Tournament 2018, and won the same age-group category in the 2019 Turkey Youth Chess Championship. He won the U-8 European Chess Championship in 2019, winning all 8 of his games and having secured the title before the final round.

Erdoğmuş attained the International Master title during the 3rd FIDE Council in 2022, following a commendable performance at the Svetozar Gligorić Memorial Chess Tournament in Serbia. The same year, he won the ChessKid Youth Speed Chess Championship online tournament. The following year, at the same tournament, he ranked 9th with 7.5 points in 10 games, while he also participated in advanced training and competitions in 2023.

In April 2024, Erdoğmuş achieved the Grandmaster title following his performance at the Grenke Chess Festival, making him the 4th-youngest GM of all time.

In May 2024, Erdoğmuş reached a rating of 2569, breaking Hungarian GM Judit Polgár's 35-year-old record as the highest ever rated player before the age of 13, while Polgar remained the highest ever ranked 12-year-old.

In July 2024, Erdoğmuş won both the U13 and U16 ChessKid Youth Championship tournaments. In October 2024, he became the youngest player ever to reach a 2600 rating by nearly a year at the age of 13 years, 3 months and 28 days, beating the previous record, held by Polgár since 1989.

In May 2025, Erdoğmuş tied for 2nd place with Sweden's top GM Nils Grandelius in the TePe Sigeman & Co chess tournament. In July 2025, he faced 49-year-old Russian GM Peter Svidler in a "Clash of Generations," a match of 6 classical games and 12 blitz games. Erdoğmuş won the classical portion of the match with 4–2 points, scoring 3 victories, while losing heavily in the blitz portion by 2–10 points. The outcome of the match propelled Erdoğmuş to the Top 100 in classical rating at the age of 14, making him the 2nd-youngest player in history to make it at that age into the Top 100, behind only Judit Polgár, who had made it at the age of 12.

In the September 2025 FIDE Grand Swiss tournament, held in Samarkand, Erdoğmuş defeated 19-year-old Indian GM Aditya Mittal with the Black pieces in a game characterized by chess writer Leonard Barden as "immortal." Erdoğmuş allowed his opponent to promote to a 2nd queen on the board and then sacrificed his own queen, in a combination ending with a pawn giving checkmate on its first move. In the same tournament, he played a 190-move game against Uzbek GM Nodirbek Abdusattorov, drawing a Queen and pawn versus queen endgame via the 50-move rule. This became the longest game in Grand Swiss history, (Note: The game between Ivan Nikolic and IM Goran Arsovic (Belgrade, 1989) is the longest ever in tournament play, with a total of 269 moves. The endgame of rook & bishop vs. rook ended in a draw after over 20 hours of play. See Chess Records.) surpassing the 157-mover Grandelius vs. Kuzubov from the 10th round in 2021. In the next round, he played a short 16-move draw against his coach, Shakhriyar Mamedyarov.

Observing Erdoğmuş' performance in the Grand Swiss, five-time classical chess world champion Magnus Carlsen commented that "Erdoğmuş is really, really good, at almost unprecedented levels at that age," while American grandmaster and streamer Ben Finegold predicted that Erdoğmuş would be world champion within eight years. Following his 8.5/13 performance at the World Rapid Chess Championship 2025, where Erdoğmuş lost to Carlsen in the penultimate round, Carlsen said “Yağız is the best 14-year-old the world has ever seen...we will be hearing a lot about him in the future.”

In January 2026, Erdoğmuş played in the Tata Steel Masters, the youngest to ever play in the event at 14. Erdoğmuş performed well, tying for sixth place with a score of 7/13 (+4-3=6).

In May 2026, Erdoğmuş played again in the TePe Sigeman & Co chess tournament, and tied for 3rd place with Nodirbek Abdusattorov. In the tournament, Erdoğmuş played against Magnus Carlsen for the first time in a classical chess game. Erdoğmuş proceeded to suffer his only loss of the tournament against Carlsen, the eventual tournament winner. He was, however, praised for his performance, with a tournament performance rating of 2757.

In July 2026, Erdogmus played in the Biel Chess Festival, held in Biel, Switzerland, where he defeated Jose Martinez Alcantara, the number one GM in Mexico, in the same manner he defeated Aditya Mittal a year prior. He got 3rd place on the standings and was seen having an undefeated streak in the classicals, drawing with all participants, including Lê Quang Liêm and Levon Aronian, except Martinez.

== See also ==
- Ediz Gürel
- Emre Can
