= S. L. Narayanan =

Indian chess grandmaster (born 1998)

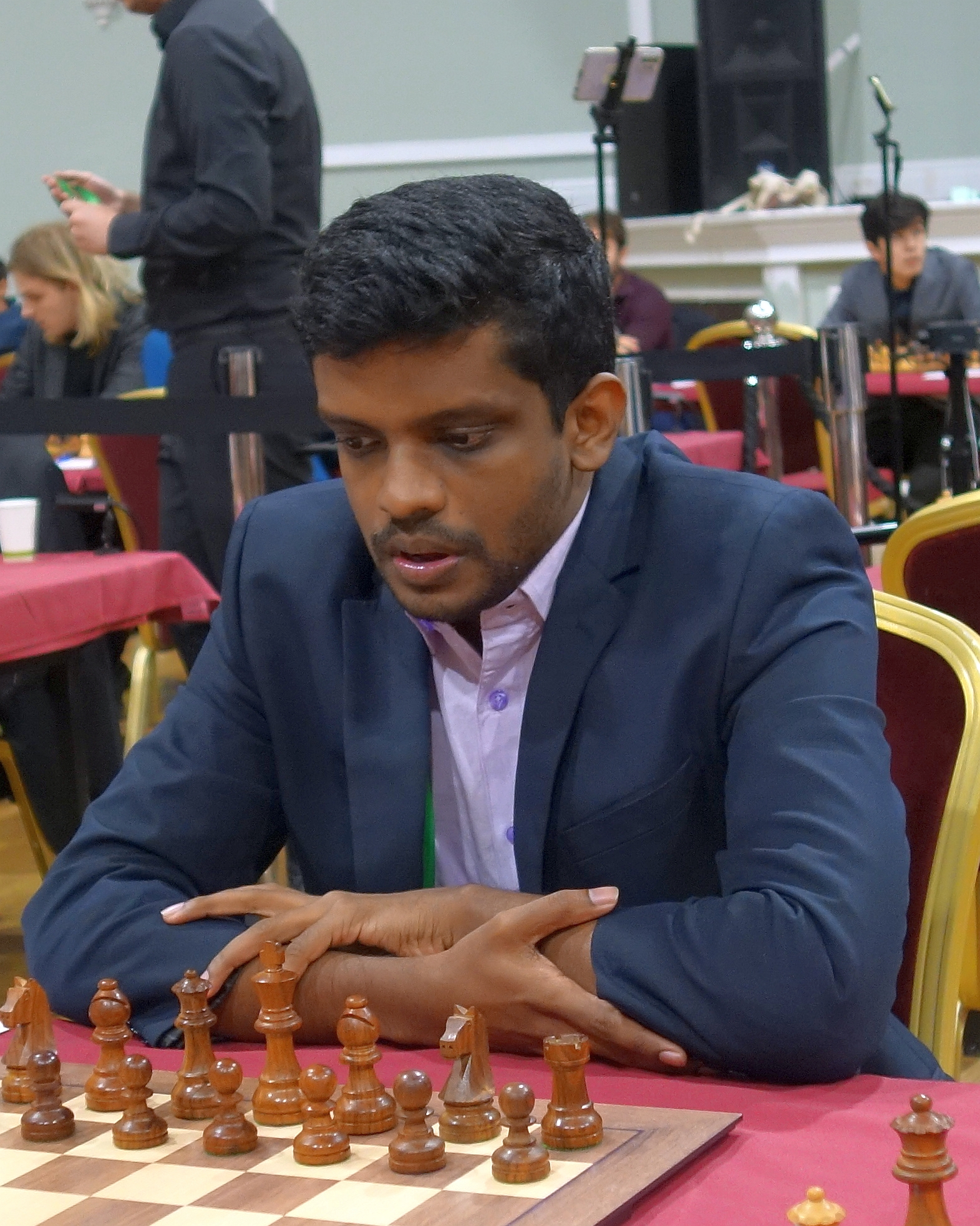
- S. L. Narayanan at FIDE Grand Swiss 2023

Personal information
- Full name: Sunilduth Lyna Narayanan
- Born: 10 January 1998 (age 28) Thiruvananthapuram, Kerala, India

Chess career
- Country: India
- Title: Grandmaster (2015)
- FIDE rating: 2557 (October 2026)
- Peak rating: 2695 (March 2024)
- Peak ranking: No. 40 (May 2024)

Sunilduth Lyna Narayanan (born 10 January 1998) is an Indian chess player. He earned the title of Grandmaster in 2015 and is the 41st Grandmaster from India. As of January 2026, he is ranked No. 17 in India.

== Early life ==
Narayanan was born in Thiruvananthapuram, Kerala. He was trained professionally by former Kerala State Champion P. Sreekumar, and subsequently by International Master Varugeese Koshy.

== Career ==
Narayanan won his first championship, the Kerala State Under 9 Championship, in August 2007. The same day, Kerala got their first Grandmaster, G. N. Gopal. Narayanan was the Under-11 Kerala State Chess champion in 2008, Under 13 State Champion in 2010, State Sub Junior Champion in 2011, State Junior Champion in 2012, and 2nd in State Senior in 2012. Narayanan won the silver medal for the Under 12 category in the Commonwealth Chess Championship which was held in Delhi in May 2010. In that tournament, he drew with Grandmaster Parimarjan Negi and beat WIM Kiran Manisha Mohanthy at age 12. In July 2011, he attended training from Grandmaster Yevgeny Vladimirov at the Chess Camp First Move conducted by Lakshya and Flame School in Pune, Maharashtra.

The first time Narayanan played against a grandmaster was in January 2010, during the Parsvnath Open Chess Tournament in Delhi. He was offered a walkover as his first-round opponent and third seed Ehsan Ghaem Maghami failed to turn up on time because of a delayed flight. However, the 11-year-old Narayanan declined the walkover and agreed to play Maghami, who went on to win the game. When asked about this, Narayanan said, "it is only fair to give him a chance; besides being able to play a GM is a big deal".

== Chess career ==
- 2010: Won silver in the under-16 category of the Commonwealth Chess Championship held in New Delhi.
- 2011: In July, he won silver in the National Sub Junior Chess Championship held in Chennai. In September, he achieved 7th place in the 41st National Junior Chess Championship held in Goa.
- 2012: Played on the first board for the bronze medal-winning Indian team at the Under-16 Chess Olympiad. Won gold in the under-16 category of the Commonwealth Chess Championship. Achieved 7th in the open section.
- 2013: Achieved 4th in the 43rd National Junior Chess Championship held in Lucknow.
- 2014: Won gold in the 44th National Junior Chess Championship held in Pune.
- 2015: Best junior in the Thailand Open held in Bangkok. Won silver in the Asian Junior Chess Championship held in Bishkek, Kyrgyz Republic.
- 2016: Won bronze in the World Junior Chess Championship held in Odisha, India. Won gold in the Asian Junior Blitz Chess Championship, silver in the Asian Junior Chess Championship, and bronze in the Asian Junior Rapid Chess Championship.
- 2017: Beat then-reigning world blitz champion Sergey Karjakin 1.5–0.5 in the Aeroflot Blitz championship held in Moscow.
- 2018: Won bronze in blitz in the 25th Abu Dhabi International Chess Festival. Won bronze in the Zurich Christmas Open held in Zurich, Switzerland in December.
- 2019: Won a Chess.com Titled Tuesday, defeating a field including Hikaru Nakamura and Wesley So. Champion of the first Ellobregat Open held in Spain. He was the third seed, and secured the title following a playoff win over second seed Mateusz Bartel of Poland. Achieved 4th in the Asian Chess Championship. Won bronze in the blitz event there. Achieved 4th in the Commonwealth Chess Championship. Qualified for the Chess World Cup 2019, where he was knocked out in the first round after rapid tiebreaks against David Antón Guijarro.
- 2020: Won the Kerala Checkmate COVID-19 online blitz tournament, scoring 9/10. Contributed the prize money to the Kerala Chief Minister's Distress Relief Fund. Faced Magnus Carlsen in round 1 of the Chess24 Banter Final, losing 0.5–5.5.
- 2021: In August, he finished second in the Riga Technical University Open "A" tournament. In October, he finished second in the ChessMood Open 2021.
- 2022: Achieved first in the 1st Grandiscacchi Catholica International Open.
- 2023: Won bronze in the Qatar Masters Open.
