= Gergely Kántor =

Hungarian chess grandmaster (born 1999)

Personal information
- Born: 19 July 1999 (age 26) Budapest, Hungary

Chess career
- Country: Hungary
- Title: Grandmaster (2019)
- FIDE rating: 2537 (July 2026)
- Peak rating: 2590 (April 2022)

Gergely Kántor (born 19 July 1999) is a Hungarian chess player who holds the title of Grandmaster (GM, 2019).

== Biography ==
Gergely Kántor started playing chess when he was seven years old. At the age of 12, he was signed by the multiple Hungarian Champion Chess Club Aquaprofit NTSK. In 2012, at the age of 13, Gergely Kántor took 2nd place at the Hungarian Junior Chess Championship (U20). In the same year, he won a silver medal with the Hungarian national team at the U18 European Chess Team Championship. In 2013, Gergely Kántor won a bronze medal at the Hungarian Junior Chess Championship (U20). In 2015, he finished in 4th place with the same score as 2nd place at the U16 World Youth Chess Championship.

In 2012, at the age of 13, Gergely Kántor obtained the title of FIDE master, in 2014, under the guidance of Grandmaster Péter Lukács and master coach Dr. László Hazai, he became an international master at the age of 15. Gergely Kántor met the grandmaster norm at the Árpád Vajda Memorial tournament in February 2018, and at the First Saturday Grandmaster Competition in March 2019 and July 2019. Based on these three achievements, he received the title at the FIDE board meeting held in Budapest.

In 2019, Gergely Kántor won the Hungarian Junior Chess Championship (U20).

Gergely Kántor played for Hungary in the Chess Olympiad:

- In 2022, at fourth board in the 44th Chess Olympiad in Chennai (+1, =3, -3).
