= Diptayan Ghosh =

Indian chess grandmaster (born 1998)

Personal information
- Born: 10 August 1998 (age 27) Kolkata, India

Chess career
- Country: India
- Title: Grandmaster (2016)
- FIDE rating: 2554 (July 2026)
- Peak rating: 2581 (March 2017)

Diptayan Ghosh (born 10 August, 1998) is a chess player from Kolkata, India. He qualified as a grandmaster at the age of 17 after achieving his third and final norm required for the title at the HDBank International Chess Open Tournament in Ho Chi Minh City, Vietnam in March 2016.

Ghosh won the gold medal at the Asian Youth Chess Championships in the Under 10 section in 2008 and the Under 12 in 2009. He was a member of the gold medal-winning Indian team in the World Youth U-16 Chess Olympiad in 2013 and 2014.

Ghosh qualified for the Chess World Cup 2025 where he caused a major upset, defeating reigning World Blitz Chess Champion and former World Championship contender Ian Nepomniachtchi in the second round.

== Biography ==
He studied at the South Point School and St. Xavier's College. Later, he obtained a master's degree from the Delhi School of Economics. He worked at the IDFC First Bank in Mumbai between July 2021 and December 2022, but quit his job in order to pursue chess.
