= Emre Can (chess player) =

Turkish chess grandmaster (born 1990)

- Can at the 2026 Chess Olympiad

Personal information
- Born: January 21, 1990 (age 36) İzmir, Turkey

Chess career
- Country: Turkey
- Title: Grandmaster (2010)
- FIDE rating: 2528 (November 2026)
- Peak rating: 2605 (December 2015)

Emre Can (Turkish pronunciation: [ˈemɾe ˈdʒan]; born January 21, 1990) is a Turkish chess grandmaster. He earned FIDE titles as FIDE Master (FM) in 2006, International Master (IM) in 2007 and Grandmaster (GM) on July 25, 2010.

He was born in İzmir, Turkey on January 21, 1990.

He began playing chess at the age of seven. In 1999, Emre Can participated at the chess championship held in Antalya, Turkey becoming second in his age group. In 2000, he took part at the World Youth Chess Championship held in Oropesa del Mar, Spain. At the age of 16, he won the first title in his age category among 102 players from 19 countries at the 13th Youth Chess Olympiad held in Novi Sad, Serbia on July 1–9. He has a fourth place at the European U-18 Chess Championship.

In 2011, he became the Turkish chess champion, while studying as a student of Information technology at Kadir Has University in Istanbul.

== Achievements ==
Turkish Chess Championship

- 2006 - 5th
- 2011 - champion
