= Karthikeyan Murali =

Indian chess grandmaster (born 1999)

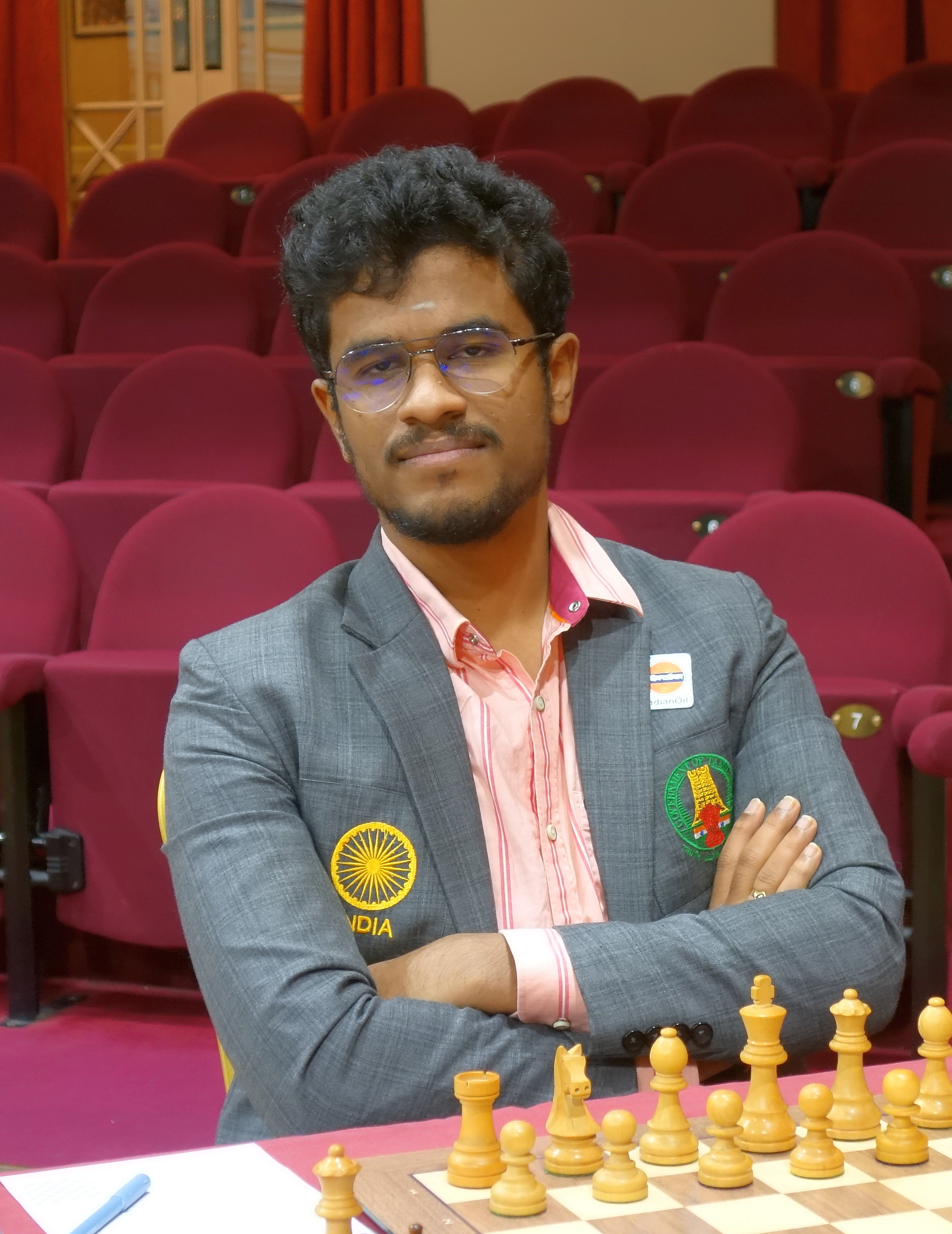
- Karthikeyan in 2023

Personal information
- Born: 5 January 1999 (age 27) Thanjavur, Tamil Nadu, India

Chess career
- Country: India
- Title: Grandmaster (2015)
- FIDE rating: 2647 (September 2026)
- Peak rating: 2669 (September 2025)
- Ranking: No. 68 (September 2026)
- Peak ranking: No. 46 (July 2026)

Karthikeyan Murali (born 5 January 1999) is an Indian chess grandmaster. He was awarded the title of Grandmaster by FIDE in 2015. Karthikeyan is a two-time national champion.

== Chess career ==
Born in Thanjavur, Karthikeyan learnt chess at the age of five. In December 2011, he won the Under 12 section of the World Youth Chess Championships held in Caldas Novas, Brazil. Two years later he also won the world U16 title in Al Ain.

In 2014 he tied for third place at the Abu Dhabi Masters tournament and helped the Indian team win the Under 16 Chess Olympiad in Győr, Hungary. In this latter competition he also completed all requirements for the title Grandmaster.

In 2015, Karthikeyan won the 53rd National Premier Chess Championship of India in Tiruvarur edging out Vidit Santosh Gujrathi, whom he defeated in the direct encounter, on tiebreak, after both scored 8½ points from 13 games. Karthikeyan also won the 54th edition of the championship held in Lucknow in 2016. Though he had a slow start, and lost the match against eventual runner-up Aravindh Chithambaram, a crucial win against top seed Vidit Santosh Gujrathi on time control, followed by double withdrawals helped in gaining the lead and ultimately winning the championships.

In January 2019, Karthikeyan placed second in the Gibraltar Masters open tournament among a field of over 250 players. In June 2019, he placed second in the Asian championships, aided by a win with black against Alireza Firouzja in which Karthikeyan sacrificed his queen on move 9. in 2023 Karthikeyan Murali became only the third Indian to beat Magnus Carlsen in classical chess.

In April 2025, Karthikeyan placed third in the 4th Menorca Open among a field of over 300 players. In July 2025, he won the 58th Biel Masters Open with 8/10.

== Personal life ==
He was inducted in Oil and Natural Gas Corporation (ONGC) for scholarship from 2014 to 2016. Later, he got employed in Indian Oil Corporation (IOC) since October 2017.
