= Karthik Venkataraman =

Indian chess grandmaster (born 1999)

Personal information
- Born: 22 December 1999 (age 26) Vellore, Tamil Nadu, India

Chess career
- Country: India
- Title: Grandmaster (2018)
- FIDE rating: 2566 (July 2026)
- Peak rating: 2609 (December 2023)

Karthik Venkataraman (born 22 December 1999), is an Indian chess grandmaster. He is a two-time Indian Chess Champion.

== Chess career ==
Karthik began playing chess at the age of 7. He won the Indian National Championship 2022 after drawing against N. R. Visakh in the final round.

In May 2023, Karthik won the Indian Chess Championship.

Karthik competed in the Chess World Cup 2023, where he defeated Gregory Kaidanov in the first round, but was defeated by Hikaru Nakamura in the second round.

In the 2024 Indian Chess Championship, he tied for first place along with S. S. Ganguly and Neelash Saha. He was declared the winner after tiebreaks.

== Personal life ==
He is studying for an MBA at SRM Institute of Science and Technology in Chennai.

Achievements
Preceded by Arjun Erigaisi	Indian Chess Champion; 2023	Succeeded by P. Iniyan
