= 2025 in chess =

Major chess events in 2025 include the annual Tata Steel Chess Tournament, Norway Chess and Grand Chess Tour. Women's World Champion Ju Wenjun defended her title against challenger Tan Zhongyi in the Women's World Chess Championship. Anish Giri won the FIDE Grand Swiss Tournament and, alongside runner-up Matthias Blübaum, qualified for the Candidates Tournament 2026. The Chess World Cup in November determined the three qualifiers. The event was won by Javokhir Sindarov, who, at age 19, became the youngest player to date to win the event. R Praggnanandhaa won the 2025 FIDE Circuit, encompassing major tournaments held in 2025, and qualified for the Candidates Tournament 2026. The annual World Rapid and Blitz Chess Championships took place in December, where Magnus Carlsen clinched both World Rapid and Blitz titles, meanwhile Aleksandra Goryachkina and Bibisara Assaubayeva claimed the Women's Rapid and Blitz titles respectively.

== Timeline ==
January 2025 FIDE Rankings
Rank	Prev	Player	Rating	Change
1	1	(Norway) Magnus Carlsen	2831	0
2	2	(United States) Fabiano Caruana	2803	-2
3	3	(United States) Hikaru Nakamura	2802	0
4	4	(India) Arjun Erigaisi	2801	0
5	5	(India) Gukesh Dommaraju	2777	-6
6	6	(Uzbekistan) Nodirbek Abdusattorov	2768	-9
7	7	(France) Alireza Firouzja	2763	0
8	8	(FIDE) Ian Nepomniachtchi	2754	-1
9	9	(China) Wei Yi	2751	-2
10	10	(India) Viswanathan Anand	2750	0

=== January ===
- Jan 4 – World number one Magnus Carlsen married Ella Victoria Malone in a ceremony in Oslo.
- Jan 8 – Vladimir Fedoseev won the Freestyle Chess play-in to qualify for the Weissenhaus Grand Slam, the first leg of the Freestyle Chess Grand Slam Tour.
- Jan 11 – 9-year-old Roman Shogdzhiev became the youngest player to score an International Master norm.
- Jan 11 – Magnus Carlsen made his debut for FC St. Pauli in the Chess Bundesliga, where he played for the first time since 2008, scoring 1½/2.
- Jan 17 – The President of India, Droupadi Murmu conferred the Khel Ratna Award on World Champion Gukesh Dommaraju.
- Jan 24 – The FIDE Council decided to allow the participation of teams consisting of neutral athletes, particularly Russian and Belarusian athletes, in youth competitions and events for players with disabilities.
- Jan 27 – In a decision by the FIDE Ethics and Disciplinary Commission, Andrejs Strebkovs' ban from all FIDE-rated events was extended to 12 years, and his FIDE title of International Master was revoked.

February 2025 FIDE Rankings
Rank	Prev	Player	Rating	Change
1	1	(Norway) Magnus Carlsen	2833	+2
2	2	(United States) Fabiano Caruana	2803	0
3	3	(United States) Hikaru Nakamura	2802	0
4	4	(India) Arjun Erigaisi	2801	0
5	5	(India) Gukesh Dommaraju	2777	0
6	6	(Uzbekistan) Nodirbek Abdusattorov	2766	-2
7	7	(France) Alireza Firouzja	2760	-3
8	9	(China) Wei Yi	2755	+4
9	8	(FIDE) Ian Nepomniachtchi	2754	0
10	10	(India) Viswanathan Anand	2750	0

=== February ===
- Feb 2 – R Praggnanandhaa defeated Gukesh Dommaraju 2–1 in a blitz playoff to win the Tata Steel Masters, after both players finished on 8½/13. Gukesh lost his first game as world champion in the final round against Arjun Erigaisi. Thai Dai Van Nguyen won the Challengers and qualified for the 2026 Masters.
- Feb 10 – FIDE announced that the Women's World Chess Championship 2025 between Ju Wenjun and Tan Zhongyi would take place in Shanghai and Chongqing from April 1 to 23.
- Feb 14 – Vincent Keymer won the first leg of the Freestyle Chess Grand Slam Tour after defeating Magnus Carlsen in the semifinals and Fabiano Caruana in the finals.
- Feb 21 – Magnus Carlsen won the Chessable Masters, the first leg of the Champions Chess Tour 2025. The top three – Carlsen, Hikaru Nakamura, and Ian Nepomniachtchi, qualified for the 2025 Esports World Cup.
- Feb 27 – Aleksandra Goryachkina won the third leg of the FIDE Women's Grand Prix 2024–25 on tiebreaks, ahead of Koneru Humpy and Batkhuyag Munguntuul, who all scored 5½/9. Goryachkina took the lead in the Grand Prix standings.

March 2025 FIDE Rankings
Rank	Prev	Player	Rating	Change
1	1	(Norway) Magnus Carlsen	2833	0
2	3	(United States) Hikaru Nakamura	2802	0
3	5	(India) Gukesh Dommaraju	2787	+10
4	2	(United States) Fabiano Caruana	2783	-20
5	4	(India) Arjun Erigaisi	2777	-24
6	6	(Uzbekistan) Nodirbek Abdusattorov	2773	+7
7	8	(China) Wei Yi	2760	+5
8	14	(India) R Praggnanandhaa	2758	+17
9	7	(France) Alireza Firouzja	2757	-3
10	8	(FIDE) Ian Nepomniachtchi	2753	-1

=== March ===
- Mar 6 – Ian Nepomniachtchi won the Aeroflot Open for the fourth time, ahead of Richárd Rapport and Andrey Esipenko.
- Mar 7 – Aravindh Chithambaram won the Prague Chess Festival Masters, going undefeated with three wins and six draws. Nodirbek Yakubboev won the Challengers after defeating Jonas Buhl Bjerre 1½-½ in a playoff.
- Mar 7 – Pranav V and Anna Shukhman became the World Junior Chess Champions.
- Mar 8 – Daniil Dubov played an exhibition blitz match against Hans Niemann in Moscow, winning 9½-8½.
- Mar 15 – Vidit Gujrathi won the Freestyle Chess play-in to qualify for the Paris Grand Slam, the second leg of the Freestyle Chess Grand Slam Tour.
- Mar 23 – Hikaru Nakamura won the American Cup, after beating Fabiano Caruana in the grand final. It was the second time he won the event, after first winning it in 2023. He also won the blitz tournament held the following day.
- Mar 24 – Anna Muzychuk won the fourth leg of the FIDE Women's Grand Prix 2024–25, edging out Zhu Jiner on tiebreaks.
- Mar 26 – The FIDE Ethics and Disciplinary Commission sanctioned Kirill Shevchenko with a worldwide ban of three years, with one year of the sanction suspended, after finding him guilty of breaching Article 11.7(e) of the Disciplinary Code by attempting to cheat using an electronic device in the Spanish Team Championship.
- Mar 27 – Matthias Blübaum won the European Individual Chess Championship, becoming the first player to win it twice. Frederik Svane and Maxim Rodshtein finished on the same score as Blübaum, but came second and third on tiebreaks, respectively.

April 2025 FIDE Rankings
Rank	Prev	Player	Rating	Change
1	1	(Norway) Magnus Carlsen	2837	+4
2	2	(United States) Hikaru Nakamura	2804	+2
3	3	(India) Gukesh Dommaraju	2787	0
4	5	(India) Arjun Erigaisi	2782	+5
5	4	(United States) Fabiano Caruana	2776	-7
6	6	(Uzbekistan) Nodirbek Abdusattorov	2773	0
7	7	(China) Wei Yi	2758	-2
8	8	(India) R Praggnanandhaa	2758	0
9	10	(FIDE) Ian Nepomniachtchi	2757	+4
10	9	(France) Alireza Firouzja	2757	0

=== April ===
- Apr 2 – Vidit Gujrathi married Nidhi Kataria in a wedding held at the Oxford Golf Resort in Pune. It was attended by World Champion Gukesh Dommaraju, five-time World Champion Viswanathan Anand, Arjun Erigaisi and Anish Giri, among others.
- Apr 14 – Magnus Carlsen won the second leg of the Freestyle Chess Grand Slam Tour after defeating Fabiano Caruana in the semifinals, and Hikaru Nakamura in the final.
- Apr 16 – Ju Wenjun defeated Tan Zhongyi by a score of 6½-2½ to win the Women's World Chess Championship 2025, retaining her title and becoming world champion for the fifth time.
- Apr 21 – Magnus Carlsen scored a perfect 9/9 in the inaugural Grenke Freestyle Open and won the tournament. Aswath S tied with Brandon Jacobson with 8/9 in Classical Open but won on tiebreaks.
- Apr 23 – Koneru Humpy won the fifth leg of the FIDE Women's Grand Prix 2024–25 on tiebreaks, ahead of Zhu Jiner.
- Apr 27 – Vasily Ivanchuk won the 4th Menorca Open with 8/9.
- Apr 30 – Vladimir Fedoseev won the GCT Rapid & Blitz Poland with three rounds to spare, scoring 26½/36. Maxime Vachier-Lagrave finished second with 21½/36, while R Praggnanandhaa finished third with 20½/36.

May 2025 FIDE Rankings
Rank	Prev	Player	Rating	Change
1	1	(Norway) Magnus Carlsen	2837	0
2	2	(United States) Hikaru Nakamura	2804	0
3	3	(India) Gukesh Dommaraju	2787	0
4	5	(India) Arjun Erigaisi	2782	0
5	4	(United States) Fabiano Caruana	2776	0
6	6	(Uzbekistan) Nodirbek Abdusattorov	2771	-2
7	7	(China) Wei Yi	2758	0
8	8	(India) R Praggnanandhaa	2758	0
9	10	(FIDE) Ian Nepomniachtchi	2757	0
10	9	(France) Alireza Firouzja	2757	0

=== May ===
- May 3 – Christopher Yoo won the Sardinia Chess Festival with a score of 7.5/9.
- May 6 – Aleksandar Inđić won the Baku Open 2025 with a score of 7/9.
- May 9 – Christopher Yoo was slapped with a 60-day provisional suspension (9 May – July 8) after multiple harassment complaints, previously under USCF domestic ban since November 14, 2024.
- May 11 - The Taliban suspended chess due to religious concerns and questions about its connection to gambling.
- May 15 – Bardiya Daneshvar won the Asian Chess Championship which was his maiden title. He had tied with Nihal Sarin by 7/9 but won by tiebreaks. The defending champion Shamsiddin Vokhidov finished third with 6.5/9. Song Yuxin won in the women's section.
- May 16 – There was a three-way tie for first between R Praggnanandhaa, Maxime Vachier-Lagrave and Alireza Firouzja in the Superbet Chess Classic on 5½/9. Praggnanandhaa won the blitz playoff to win the tournament.
- May 16 – Anna Muzychuk won the final leg of the FIDE Women's Grand Prix 2024–25 on tiebreaks, ahead of Zhu Jiner. Thus Zhu Jiner and Aleksandra Goryachkina who finished as winner and runner-up of the FIDE Women's Grand Prix 2024–25 both qualified for the Women's Candidates Tournament 2026.
- May 23 – Vincent Keymer won his maiden German Chess Championship, held in Munich.
- May 25 – Anish Giri won the Sharjah Masters ahead of Aleksandar Indjic and Nodirbek Abdusattorov.
- May 26 – Javokhir Sindarov won the TePe Sigeman & Co chess tournament ahead of Yagiz Kaan Erdogmus and Nils Grandelius.
- May 31 – Sam Shankland won the American Continental Championship for third time in his career. José Martínez and Alexandr Fier finished second and third place respectively.

June 2025 FIDE Rankings
Rank	Prev	Player	Rating	Change
1	1	(Norway) Magnus Carlsen	2837	0
2	2	(United States) Hikaru Nakamura	2804	0
3	4	(India) Arjun Erigaisi	2782	0
4	5	(United States) Fabiano Caruana	2777	+1
5	3	(India) Gukesh Dommaraju	2776	-11
6	6	(Uzbekistan) Nodirbek Abdusattorov	2767	-4
7	7	(India) R Praggnanandhaa	2767	+9
8	9	(France) Alireza Firouzja	2766	+9
9	8	(China) Wei Yi	2758	0
10	10	(FIDE) Ian Nepomniachtchi	2757	0

=== June ===
- Jun 1 – World Champion Gukesh Dommaraju defeated world number one and former world champion Magnus Carlsen for the first time in a classical game in the sixth round of Norway Chess.
- Jun 4 – Aleksey Grebnev won the Dubai Open with a score of 7/9, ahead of Alan Pichot.
- Jun 6 – Aravindh Chithambaram won the Stepan Avagyan Memorial on tiebreaks ahead of R Praggnanandhaa and climbed into the world's top ten in live ratings for the first time.
- Jun 6 – Magnus Carlsen won Norway Chess for the seventh time, while Anna Muzychuk won the women's event.
- Jun 13 – Team MGD1, led by Arjun Erigaisi, won the World Rapid Team Championship.
- Jun 15 – The WR Chess Team defended their title at the World Blitz Team Championship.
- Jun 27 – There was a three-way tie between R Praggnanandhaa, Nodirbek Abdusattorov and Javokhir Sindarov for first place in the UzChess Cup Masters with 5½/9. Praggnanandhaa won after two blitz playoffs to win the tournament. Nikolas Theodorou won the Challengers section with 6½/9.
- Jun 30 – Alexey Sarana won the Aktobe Open with a score of 7/9, ahead of Aryan Chopra, Zhamsaran Tsydypov and P. Iniyan.

July 2025 FIDE Rankings
Rank	Prev	Player	Rating	Change
1	1	(Norway) Magnus Carlsen	2839	+2
2	2	(United States) Hikaru Nakamura	2807	+3
3	5	(United States) Fabiano Caruana	2784	+7
4	7	(India) R Praggnanandhaa	2779	+1
5	3	(India) Arjun Erigaisi	2776	-6
6	5	(India) Gukesh Dommaraju	2776	0
7	6	(Uzbekistan) Nodirbek Abdusattorov	2771	+4
8	8	(France) Alireza Firouzja	2766	0
9	9	(China) Wei Yi	2748	-10
10	12	(Netherlands) Anish Giri	2748	0

=== July ===
- Jul 1 – FIDE extends the domestic suspension of Christopher Yoo to take effect worldwide, banning him from FIDE-rated events until 14 November, following a request by the USCF. Additionally, he has been put on probation until 14 November 2030.
- Jul 1 – For the first time since the inception of FIDE rating lists, Russian players were absent from the world's top ten, after Ian Nepomniachtchi dropped to number 14. On the other hand, Anish Giri returned to the top ten after over a year.
- Jul 6 – Magnus Carlsen won the SuperUnited Rapid & Blitz Croatia with a score of 22½/36. Wesley So finished second with 20/36, while Gukesh Dommaraju finished third with 19½/36.
- Jul 20 – Levon Aronian won the fourth leg of the Freestyle Chess Grand Slam Tour after defeating Fabiano Caruana in the semifinals, and Hans Niemann in the final.
- Jul 23 – IM Divya Deshmukh defeated former Women's World Champion Tan Zhongyi in the semi-finals of Women's Chess World Cup 2025.
- Jul 24 – Vladimir Fedoseev won the Biel Masters Triathlon on tiebreaks, ahead of Aravindh Chithambaram. Nikolas Theodorou won the Challengers Triathlon. The traditional open tournament was won by Karthikeyan Murali with a score of 8/10.
- Jul 27 – Former Women's World Champion Tan Zhongyi defeated Lei Tingjie in the match for third place in the Women's Chess World Cup 2025 and qualified for the Women's Candidates Tournament 2026.
- Jul 28 – Divya Deshmukh defeated Koneru Humpy in final of the Women's Chess World Cup 2025 with 2½–1½ and became the third Women's World Cup Champion. Both the winner and the runner-up secured a spot for the Women's Candidates Tournament 2026.

August 2025 FIDE Rankings
Rank	Prev	Player	Rating	Change
1	1	(Norway) Magnus Carlsen	2839	0
2	2	(United States) Hikaru Nakamura	2807	0
3	3	(United States) Fabiano Caruana	2784	0
4	4	(India) R Praggnanandhaa	2779	0
5	5	(India) Arjun Erigaisi	2776	0
6	6	(India) Gukesh Dommaraju	2776	0
7	7	(Uzbekistan) Nodirbek Abdusattorov	2771	0
8	8	(France) Alireza Firouzja	2766	0
9	9	(China) Wei Yi	2753	+5
10	10	(Netherlands) Anish Giri	2748	0

=== August ===
- Aug 1 – Magnus Carlsen, signed with Team Liquid, won the inaugural chess event at the Esports World Cup, defeating Alireza Firouzja (Team Falcons) in the final.
- Aug 7 – There was an exhibition Blitz match between Jan-Krzysztof Duda & Gukesh Dommaraju hosted in Katowice, Poland. Duda won the match with a score of 5–1 despite losing the first game.
- Aug 15 – Vincent Keymer won the Chennai Grand Masters with one round to spare and reached into the World's Top ten in live ratings for the first time. Pranesh M won the Challengers section with 6½/9.
- Aug 15 – Levon Aronian won the Saint Louis Rapid & Blitz with 24½/36. Fabiano Caruana finished second with 21½/36 while Maxime Vachier-Lagrave finished third with 21/36.
- Aug 24 – Denis Lazavik won Abu Dhabi Masters on tiebreaks with 7/9, tying with four other players Zeng Chongsheng, Arkadij Naiditsch, Aleksey Grebnev & IM Maksim Tsaruk.
- Aug 24 – Nodirbek Yakubboev won the 61st Rubinstein Memorial with 6½/9 ahead of Radosław Wojtaszek & Matthias Blübaum.
- Aug 26 – FIDE announced that the Chess World Cup 2025 would take place in Goa, India from October 31 to November 27.
- Aug 28 – There was a three-way tie for first place between Wesley So, R Praggnanandhaa and Fabiano Caruana at the Sinquefield Cup. So won the tournament after blitz playoffs.
- Aug 29 – FIDE revokes the Grandmaster title of Kirill Shevchenko in their final decision regarding the cheating scandal.

September 2025 FIDE Rankings
Rank	Prev	Player	Rating	Change
1	1	(Norway) Magnus Carlsen	2839	0
2	2	(United States) Hikaru Nakamura	2807	0
3	3	(United States) Fabiano Caruana	2789	+5
4	4	(India) R Praggnanandhaa	2785	+6
5	5	(India) Arjun Erigaisi	2771	-5
6	6	(India) Gukesh Dommaraju	2767	-9
7	12	(United States) Wesley So	2756	+12
8	8	(France) Alireza Firouzja	2754	-12
9	9	(China) Wei Yi	2753	+5
10	21	(Germany) Vincent Keymer	2751	+21

=== September ===
- Sep 1 – Pranav V won the inaugural Fujairah Global Championship scoring 7/9, with the big upsets of top seeds Nihal Sarin & Amin Tabatabaei.
- Sep 8 – Sixteen year old Abhimanyu Mishra defeated the reigning World Champion Gukesh Dommaraju in the fifth round of FIDE Grand Swiss and became the youngest player in history to defeat a reigning World Champion.
- Sep 15 – Anish Giri won the FIDE Grand Swiss with 8/11. He qualified for the Candidates Tournament 2026 along with the runner-up Matthias Blübaum.
- Sep 15 – Vaishali Rameshbabu won the FIDE Women's Grand Swiss defending her previous title, and became the first player to win multiple Women's Grand Swiss events. She along with the runner-up Kateryna Lagno, qualified for the Women's Candidates Tournament 2026.

October 2025 FIDE Rankings
Rank	Prev	Player	Rating	Change
1	1	(Norway) Magnus Carlsen	2839	0
2	2	(United States) Hikaru Nakamura	2816	+9
3	3	(United States) Fabiano Caruana	2789	0
4	5	(India) Arjun Erigaisi	2773	+2
5	4	(India) R Praggnanandhaa	2771	-14
6	8	(France) Alireza Firouzja	2762	+8
7	12	(Netherlands) Anish Giri	2759	+13
8	7	(United States) Wesley So	2756	0
9	10	(Germany) Vincent Keymer	2755	+4
10	9	(China) Wei Yi	2754	+1

=== October ===
- Oct 3 – Fabiano Caruana won the Grand Chess Tour 2025 after defeating Maxime Vachier-Lagrave in the Grand Finals by 15–13. Levon Aronian finished third after defeating R Praggnanandhaa in the third-place match by 20–8.
- Oct 4 – FIDE revealed the tournament bracket for Chess World Cup 2025 on their official website.
- Oct 5 – Team USA defeated Team India in the first leg of 'Checkmate - USA vs India' match held in Arlington, Texas, United States.
- Oct 15 – FIDE announced a new World Championship tournament in chess named 'Total Chess World Championship Tour', organized by Norway Chess. The tournament will determine a World Chess Combined Champion from all three formats - Fast Classical (45+30, introduced in Sep 2025), Rapid and Blitz. A one-tournament pilot version will kick off during late 2026, to test the new tour format, with the full official tournament to follow from 2027 onwards. It will also serve as a new qualification pathway for Candidates Tournament in the next cycle.
- Oct 19 – American grandmaster and commentator Daniel Naroditsky died in Mecklenburg County, North Carolina at the age of 29. The Charlotte Chess Center announced his death the following day, without citing a cause. The chess community expressed widespread grief at his sudden demise.
- Oct 22 – FIDE announced an investigation into former world champion Vladimir Kramnik's campaign of cheating allegations against Daniel Naroditsky. FIDE President Arkady Dvorkovich stated that all relevant public statements made by Kramnik would be referred to the Ethics and Disciplinary Commission for independent consideration.
- Oct 29 – Magnus Carlsen won the 'Clutch Chess - Champions Showdown', a rapid chess tournament organised by Saint Louis chess club which also included star players like Hikaru Nakamura, Fabiano Caruana and reigning World Champion Gukesh Dommaraju.

November 2025 FIDE Rankings
Rank	Prev	Player	Rating	Change
1	1	(Norway) Magnus Carlsen	2839	0
2	2	(United States) Hikaru Nakamura	2813	-3
3	3	(United States) Fabiano Caruana	2795	+6
4	9	(Germany) Vincent Keymer	2773	+18
5	7	(Netherlands) Anish Giri	2769	+10
6	4	(India) Arjun Erigaisi	2769	+4
7	5	(India) R Praggnanandhaa	2768	+13
8	8	(United States) Wesley So	2756	0
9	11	(India) Gukesh Dommaraju	2763	+11
10	6	(France) Alireza Firouzja	2762	0

=== November ===
- Nov 10 – FIDE announced that the Candidates Tournament 2026 and the Women's Candidates Tournament 2026 would take place in Paphos, Cyprus from 28 March to 15 April 2026.
- Nov 25 – Andrey Esipenko won the third place match of 2025 FIDE World Cup after defeating Nodirbek Yakubboev by 2-0 and qualified for the Candidates Tournament 2026.
- Nov 26 – Javokhir Sindarov won the 2025 FIDE World Cup by defeating Wei Yi in final tiebreaks, making him the youngest player to win the World cup, at the age of 19. Both the finalists qualified for the Candidates Tournament 2026.

December 2025 FIDE Rankings
Rank	Prev	Player	Rating	Change
1	1	(Norway) Magnus Carlsen	2840	+1
2	2	(United States) Hikaru Nakamura	2810	-3
3	3	(United States) Fabiano Caruana	2795	0
4	4	(Germany) Vincent Keymer	2776	+3
5	6	(India) Arjun Erigaisi	2775	+6
6	10	(France) Alireza Firouzja	2762	0
7	7	(India) R Praggnanandhaa	2761	-7
8	5	(Netherlands) Anish Giri	2760	-9
9	11	(China) Wei Yi	2754	+1
10	9	(India) Gukesh Dommaraju	2754	-11

=== December ===
- Dec 5 – Nodirbek Abdusattorov won the London Chess Classic with 7½/9 and a performance rating of 2932, ahead of Alireza Firouzja and Nikita Vitiugov.
- Dec 8 – R Praggnanandhaa won the 2025 FIDE Circuit and qualified for the Candidates Tournament 2026.
- Dec 11 – Levon Aronian won the Freestyle Chess Grand Slam Tour finals held in Cape Town, South Africa. Meanwhile, Magnus Carlsen won the overall Grand Slam Tour.
- Dec 11 – Ian Nepomniachtchi won the Gashimov Memorial on tiebreaks, ahead of Vladimir Fedoseev.
- Dec 14 – FIDE’s General Assembly voted to reinstate Russian and Belarusian teams in official FIDE tournaments, fully restored youth players’ rights, allowed national symbols in junior events, and lifted Belarus hosting restrictions, while the adult symbol use is pending till further IOC consultation.
- Dec 23 – Team Alpine SG Pipers led by Fabiano Caruana won the Global Chess League 2025 after defeating the defending champions Triveni Continental Kings led by Alireza Firouzja in the final.
- Dec 28 – Magnus Carlsen won his sixth World Rapid Championship with a score of 10½/13. Aleksandra Goryachkina won the Women's World Rapid Championship after defeating Zhu Jiner in blitz play-off after they both tied for first place in Swiss stage.
- Dec 30 – Magnus Carlsen won his ninth World Blitz Championship after defeating Nodirbek Abdusattorov in the finals. Bibisara Assaubayeva won her third Women's World Blitz Championship after defeating former World Blitz champion Anna Muzychuk in the finals. She also qualified for the Women's Candidates Tournament 2026 after finishing as highest non-qualifier in Women's Events cycle 2024–25.

== Events ==
=== Major tournaments ===
FIDE World Championship cycle events are marked in blue.

Tournament	City	System	Dates	Players (2700+)	Winner	Runner-up	Third
Tata Steel Masters	(Netherlands) Wijk aan Zee	Round robin	17 Jan – 2 Feb	14 (9)	(India) R Praggnanandhaa	(India) Gukesh Dommaraju	(Uzbekistan) Nodirbek Abdusattorov
Prague Masters	(Czech Republic) Prague	Round robin	25 Feb – 7 Mar	10 (6)	(India) Aravindh Chithambaram	(Netherlands) Anish Giri	(China) Wei Yi
GCT Romania	(Romania) Bucharest	Round robin	7 – 16 May	10 (9)	(India) R Praggnanandhaa	Alireza Firouzja (France) Maxime Vachier-Lagrave	—
TePe Sigeman & Co tournament	(Sweden) Malmö	Round robin	20 – 26 May	8 (2)	(Uzbekistan) Javokhir Sindarov	(Turkey) Yagiz Kaan Erdogmus (Sweden) Nils Grandelius	—
Norway Chess	(Norway) Stavanger	Double round robin	26 May – 6 Jun	6 (6)	(Norway) Magnus Carlsen	(United States) Fabiano Caruana	(India) Gukesh Dommaraju
Stepan Avagyan Memorial	(Armenia) Jermuk	Round robin	29 May – 6 Jun	10 (2)	(India) Aravindh Chithambaram	(India) R Praggnanandhaa	(Germany) Dmitrij Kollars
UzChess Cup Masters	(Uzbekistan) Tashkent	Round robin	18 – 28 Jun	10 (7)	(India) R Praggnanandhaa	(Uzbekistan) Javokhir Sindarov	(Uzbekistan) Nodirbek Abdusattorov
Biel Masters	(Switzerland) Biel/Bienne	Multi-stage	12 – 25 Jul	6 (2)	(Slovenia) Vladimir Fedoseev	(India) Aravindh Chithambaram	(United Arab Emirates) Salem Saleh
Chennai Grand Masters	(India) Chennai	Round robin	7 – 16 Aug	10 (4)	(Germany) Vincent Keymer	(Netherlands) Anish Giri	(India) Arjun Erigaisi
Rubinstein Memorial	(Poland) Polanica-Zdrój	Round robin	15 – 24 Aug	10 (1)	(Uzbekistan) Nodirbek Yakubboev	(Poland) Radosław Wojtaszek	(Germany) Matthias Blübaum
Sinquefield Cup	(United States) St. Louis	Round robin	16 – 29 Aug	10 (9)	(United States) Wesley So	(India) R Praggnanandhaa (United States) Fabiano Caruana	—
FIDE Grand Swiss	(Uzbekistan) Samarkand	Swiss	3 – 15 Sep	116 (8)	(Netherlands) Anish Giri	(Germany) Matthias Blübaum	(France) Alireza Firouzja
GCT Finals	(Brazil) São Paulo	Single elimination	26 Sep – 4 Oct	4 (4)	(United States) Fabiano Caruana	(France) Maxime Vachier-Lagrave	(United States) Levon Aronian
Chess World Cup	(India) Goa	Single elimination	31 Oct – 27 Nov	206 (24)	(Uzbekistan) Javokhir Sindarov	(China) Wei Yi	(FIDE) Andrey Esipenko
London Chess Classic	(United Kingdom) London	Round robin	26 Nov – 5 Dec	10 (2)	(Uzbekistan) Nodirbek Abdusattorov	Alireza Firouzja	(England) Nikita Vitiugov
President Cup	(Uzbekistan) Tashkent	Round robin	4 – 12 Dec	10 (1)	(India) Nihal Sarin	(Uzbekistan) Mukhiddin Madaminov	(Uzbekistan) Shamsiddin Vokhidov

=== Opens ===
Tournament	City	TAR	Dates	Players	Winner	Runner-up	Third
Aeroflot Open	(Russia) Moscow	2704 5/8	28 Feb – 7 Mar	140	(FIDE) Ian Nepomniachtchi	(Hungary) Richárd Rapport	(FIDE) Andrey Esipenko
European Individual Championship	(Romania) Eforie	2671 5/8	14 – 27 Mar	375	(Germany) Matthias Blübaum	(Germany) Frederik Svane	(Israel) Maxim Rodshtein
Tashkent Open, Agzamov Memorial	(Uzbekistan) Tashkent	2643 5/8	19 – 30 Mar	158	(India) Nihal Sarin	(Hungary) Sanan Sjugirov	(India) Abhimanyu Puranik
Reykjavik Open	(Iceland) Reykjavík	2612 3/4	9 – 15 Apr	419	(Iran) Parham Maghsoodloo	(Ukraine) Vasyl Ivanchuk	(Azerbaijan) Mahammad Muradli
Grenke Chess Open	(Germany) Karlsruhe	2638 3/8	17 – 21 Apr	875	(India) Aswath S	(United States) Brandon Jacobson	(Croatia) Ivan Šarić (Spain) Daniil Yuffa
Menorca Open	(Spain) Menorca	2644	22 – 27 Apr	326	(Ukraine) Vasyl Ivanchuk	(China) Lu Shanglei	(India) Karthikeyan Murali
Asian Individual Championship	(United Arab Emirates) Al Ain	2652 1/2	7 – 15 Apr	157	(Iran) Bardiya Daneshvar	(India) Nihal Sarin	(Uzbekistan) Shamsiddin Vokhidov
Sharjah Masters	(United Arab Emirates) Sharjah	2690 3/8	17 – 25 May	82	(Netherlands) Anish Giri	(Serbia) Aleksandar Inđić	(Uzbekistan) Nodirbek Abdusattorov
American Absolute Championship	(Brazil) Foz do Iguaçu	2606 1/8	23 – 31 May	218	(United States) Sam Shankland	(Mexico) José Martínez Alcántara	(Brazil) Alexandr Fier
Dubai Open	(United Arab Emirates) Dubai	2620 1/4	27 May – 4 Jun	82	(FIDE) Aleksey Grebnev	(Spain) Alan Pichot	(FIDE) Ivan Zemlyanskii
Vladimir Dvorkovich Memorial - Aktobe Open	(Kazakhstan) Aktobe	2652 5/8	21 – 30 Jun	80	(Serbia) Alexey Sarana	(India) Aryan Chopra	(FIDE) Zhamsaran Tsydypov
Dole Open	(France) Aix-en-provence	2635 3/4	19 – 27 Jul	272	(India) P. Iniyan	(Poland) Jan Malek	(Ukraine) Pavel Eljanov
Oskemen Open	(Kazakhstan) Oskemen	2603 1/8	20 – 30 Jul	77	(FIDE) Aleksey Grebnev	(Hungary) Richard Rapport	(India) S.P. Sethuraman
Fujairah Global Championship	(United Arab Emirates) Fujairah	2660	25 Aug – 2 Sep	44	(India) Pranav V	(United States) Brandon Jacobson	(Mexico) José Martínez Alcántara
U.S. Masters	(United States) Charlotte	2615 1/8	26 – 30 Nov	250	(United States) Awonder Liang	(United States) Andrew Hong	(United States) Jeffery Xiong (Germany) Alexander Donchenko (Netherlands) Benjamin Bok (India) Aditya Samant (Canada) Shawn Rodrigue-Lemieux
London Chess Classic – Open	(United Kingdom) London	2608 7/8	26 Nov – 3 Dec	120	(India) R Praggnanandhaa (Serbia) Velimir Ivić (England) Ameet Ghasi	—	—

=== Rapid & Blitz events ===
Tournament	City	System	Dates	Players	Winner	Runner-up	Third
Chessable Masters	Online	Double elimination	16 – 21 Feb	16	(Norway) Magnus Carlsen	(United States) Hikaru Nakamura	Ian Nepomniachtchi
GCT Poland	(Poland) Warsaw	Round robin (Note: The rapid portion of the tournament is a single round robin, while the blitz portion is a double round robin.)	24 April – 1 May	10	(Slovenia) Vladimir Fedoseev	(France) Maxime Vachier-Lagrave	(India) R Praggnanandhaa
Chess.com Classic	Online	Double elimination	18 – 23 May	16	(Norway) Magnus Carlsen	(France) Maxime Vachier-Lagrave	(United States) Hikaru Nakamura
GCT Croatia	(Croatia) Zagreb	Round robin	2 – 6 Jul	10	(Norway) Magnus Carlsen	(United States) Wesley So	(India) Gukesh Dommaraju
Esports World Cup (Note: Part of the 2025 Esports World Cup tournament series held in Riyadh. This tournament is part of the Champions Chess Tour 2025, which uses Chess.com and not a standard board.)	(Saudi Arabia) Riyadh	Multi-stage	29 Jul – 1 Aug	16	(Norway) Magnus Carlsen	(France) Alireza Firouzja	(United States) Hikaru Nakamura
GCT St. Louis	(United States) St. Louis	Round robin	11 – 15 Aug	10	(United States) Levon Aronian	(United States) Fabiano Caruana	(France) Maxime Vachier-Lagrave
Jerusalem Masters	(Israel) Jerusalem	Multi-stage	30 Nov – 3 Dec	12	(India) Arjun Erigaisi	(India) Viswanathan Anand	(FIDE) Peter Svidler
Vugar Gashimov Memorial	(Azerbaijan) Stepanakert	Double round robin	9 – 11 Dec	6	(FIDE) Ian Nepomniachtchi	(Slovenia) Vladimir Fedoseev	(Azerbaijan) Rauf Mamedov
Shenzhen Masters	(China) Shenzhen	Single elimination	12-15 Dec	12	(China) Ding Liren	(China) Wang Hao	(China) Jiang Haochen
World Rapid Championship	(Qatar) Doha	Swiss	25 – 31 Dec	247	(Norway) Magnus Carlsen	(FIDE) Vladislav Artemiev	(India) Arjun Erigaisi
World Blitz Championship	(Qatar) Doha	Multi-stage	25 – 31 Dec	252	(Norway) Magnus Carlsen	(Uzbekistan) Nodirbek Abdusattorov	(India) Arjun Erigaisi (United States) Fabiano Caruana

=== Women's events ===
FIDE World Championship cycle events are marked in blue.

Tournament	City	System	Dates	Players (2500+)	Winner	Runner-up	Third
Monaco Grand Prix	Monaco	Round robin	17 – 28 Feb	10 (4)	(FIDE) Aleksandra Goryachkina	(India) Koneru Humpy	(Mongolia) Batkhuyag Munguntuul
Nicosia Grand Prix	(Cyprus) Nicosia	Round robin	14 – 25 Mar	10 (4)	(Ukraine) Anna Muzychuk	(China) Zhu Jiner	(India) Harika Dronavalli
World Championship	(China) Shanghai, Chongqing	Match	3 – 16 Apr	2 (2)	(China) Ju Wenjun	(China) Tan Zhongyi	—
Pune Grand Prix	(India) Pune	Round robin	14 – 25 Apr	10 (3)	(India) Koneru Humpy	(China) Zhu Jiner	(India) Divya Deshmukh
Großlobming Grand Prix	(Austria) Großlobming	Round robin	6 – 15 May	10 (4)	(Ukraine) Anna Muzychuk	(China) Zhu Jiner	(China) Tan Zhongyi
Norway Chess	(Norway) Stavanger	Double round robin	26 May – 6 Jun	6 (4)	(Ukraine) Anna Muzychuk	(China) Lei Tingjie	(India) Koneru Humpy
Cairns Cup	(United States) St. Louis	Round robin	10 – 20 Jun	10 (4)	(United States) Carissa Yip	(United States) Alice Lee	(India) Harika Dronavalli (India) Koneru Humpy
Chess World Cup	(Georgia (country)) Batumi	Single elimination	5 – 29 Jul	107 (8)	(India) Divya Deshmukh	(India) Koneru Humpy	(China) Tan Zhongyi
FIDE Grand Swiss	(Uzbekistan) Samarkand	Swiss	3 – 15 Sep	56 (4)	(India) Vaishali Rameshbabu	(FIDE) Kateryna Lagno	(Kazakhstan) Bibisara Assaubayeva
World Rapid Championship	(Qatar) Doha	Swiss	25 – 31 Dec	141 (9)	(FIDE) Aleksandra Goryachkina	(China) Zhu Jiner	(India) Koneru Humpy
World Blitz Championship	(Qatar) Doha	Multi-stage	25 – 31 Dec	140 (9)	(Kazakhstan) Bibisara Assaubayeva	(Ukraine) Anna Muzychuk	(China) Zhu Jiner (Netherlands) Eline Roebers

=== National events ===
Tournament	City	System	Dates	Players	Winner	Runner-up	Third
Armenian Championship	(Armenia) Yerevan	Round robin	14 – 22 Jan	10	Robert Hovhannisyan	Artur Davtyan	Sargis Sargsyan
Israeli Championship	(Israel) Eilat	Swiss	20 – 28 Jan	32	Yair Parkhov	Yahli Sokolovsky	Yannay Ben Ari
Montenegrin Championship	(Montenegro) Podgorica	Swiss	31 Jan – 9 Feb	50	Nikita Petrov	Nemanja Vukcevic	Denis Kadrić
Georgian Championship	(Georgia (country)) Tbilisi	Round robin	3 – 12 Feb	10	Levan Pantsulaia	Giga Quparadze	Tornike Sanikidze
Azerbaijani Championship	(Azerbaijan) Baku	Single elimination	31 Jan – 15 Feb	26	Rauf Mamedov	Shakhriyar Mamedyarov	Misratdin Iskandarov
Singaporean Championship	Singapore	Swiss	2 – 18 Feb	30	Tin Jingyao	Siddharth Jagadeesh	Enrique Paciencia
Romanian Championship	(Romania) Craiova	Swiss	15 – 23 Feb	84	David Gavrilescu	Constantin Lupulescu	Filip Magold
Vietnamese Championship	(Vietnam) Bắc Giang	Swiss	1 – 6 Mar	55	Dang Hoang Son	Nguyen Duc Hoa	Bành Gia Huy
American Cup (Note: Not a national championship)	(United States) St. Louis	Double elimination	15 – 24 Mar	8	Hikaru Nakamura	Fabiano Caruana	Levon Aronian
Canadian Championship	(Canada) Toronto	Swiss	17 – 22 Apr	90	Nikolay Noritsyn	Shawn Rodrigue-Lemieux	Razvan Preotu
Uzbekistani Championship	(Uzbekistan) Qiziltepa District	Single elimination	18 – 28 Apr	16	Nodirbek Yakubboev	Ortik Nigmatov	Mukhammadzokhid Suyarov
Polish Championship	(Poland) Kraków	Round robin	6 – 15 May	10	Paweł Teclaf	Jakub Kosakowski	Radosław Wojtaszek
German Championship	(Germany) Munich	Round robin	15 – 23 May	10	Vincent Keymer	Matthias Blübaum	Dennis Wagner
Kazakhstani Championship	(Kazakhstan) Astana	Round robin	21 May – 1 Jun	14	Kazybek Nogerbek	Denis Makhnev	Aldiyar Ansat
Serbian Championship	(Serbia) Pirot	Round robin	31 May – 6 Jun	10	Ivan Ivanisevic	Suat Atalik	Robert Markuš
Chinese Championship	(China) Xinghua	Swiss	22 Jun - 3 Jul	60	Xiao Tong	Kong Xiangrui	Zhang Di
Swedish Championship	(Sweden) Uppsala	Round robin	28 Jun – 6 Jul	10	Seo Jung-min	Erik Blomqvist	Hampus Sörensen
Norwegian Championship	(Norway) Bergen	Swiss	4 – 12 Jul	18	Jon Ludvig Hammer	Aksel Bu Kvaløy	Aryan Tari
Dutch Championship	(Netherlands) Venlo	Single elimination	5 – 12 Jul	16	Jorden van Foreest	Loek van Wely	Liam Vrolijk; Arthur De Winter
Belgian Championship	(Belgium) Westerlo	Round robin	5 – 13 Jul	10	Sim Maerevoet	Elias Ruzhansky	Mher Hovhannisyan
Slovak Championship	(Slovakia) Piešťany	Round robin	8 – 16 Jul	10	Viktor Gažík	Juraj Druska	Jerguš Pecháč
Austrian Championship	(Austria) Linz	Round robin	19 – 27 Jul	10	Dominik Horvath	Konstantin Peyrer	Valentin Dragnev
British Championship	(United Kingdom) Liverpool	Swiss	2 – 10 Aug	99	Michael Adams	Stuart Conquest	Peter Roberson
French Championship	(France) Vichy	Single elimination	15 – 24 Aug	16	Marc'Andria Maurizzi	Laurent Fressinet	Étienne Bacrot
Czech Championship	(Czech Republic) Pilsen	Round robin	23 – 31 Aug	10	Stepan Hrbek	Jan Vykouk	Tadeas Kriebel
Indian Championship	(India) Guntur	Swiss	21 Sep – 1 Oct	394	P. Iniyan	Goutham Krishna H	Krishnan Sasikiran
Russian Championship	(Russia) Moscow	Round robin	1 – 12 Oct	12	Arseniy Nesterov	Vadim Zvjaginsev	Daniil Dubov
U.S. Championship	(United States) St. Louis	Round robin	11 – 25 Oct	12	Fabiano Caruana	Wesley So	Levon Aronian
Argentine Championship	(Argentina) Buenos Aires	Round robin	25 Nov – 5 Dec	12	Diego Flores	Federico Perez Ponsa	Diego Valerga
Italian Championship	(Italy) Spilimbergo	Round robin	26 Nov – 8 Dec	12	Luca Moroni	Sabino Brunello	Francesco Bettalli
Greek Championship	(Greece) Aigio	Round robin	3 – 12 Dec	10	Vangelis Patrelakis	Vasilios Kotronias	Stamatis Kourkoulos-Arditis
Turkish Championship	(Turkey) Gaziantep	Single elimination	4 – 14 Dec	26	Işık Can	Cem Kaan Gökerkan	Vahap Şanal
Hungarian Championship	(Hungary) Budapest	Round robin	10 – 18 Dec	10	Gleb Dudin	Benjámin Gledura	Tamás Bánusz
Spanish Championship	(Spain) Marbella	Swiss	11 – 20 Dec	100	David Antón Guijarro	Jaime Santos Latasa	Alan Pichot
Brazilian Championship	(Brazil) Timbó	Swiss	14 – 22 Dec	132	Luis Paulo Supi	Alexandr Fier	Diego Di Berardino
Ukrainian Championship	(Ukraine) Lviv	Swiss	15 – 23 Dec	125	Vladislav Bakhmatsky	Roman Dehtiarov	Andrii Trushko

== Deaths ==
- 5 January — Robert Hübner, four-time World Championship candidate
- 2 February — Peter Enders, German grandmaster
- 27 February — Boris Spassky, 10th World Chess Champion
- 4 April — Friðrik Ólafsson, Icelandic grandmaster and President of FIDE (1978–1982)
- 28 April — Petr Neuman, Czech grandmaster
- 12 May — Vlastimil Hort, Czech-German grandmaster
- 18 June — Tigran Nalbandian, Armenian grandmaster
- 9 September — Jacob Murey, Soviet-born Israeli grandmaster. The Murey variation of the Petrov's Defence is named after him.
- 19 October — Daniel Naroditsky, American grandmaster, author and commentator
- 26 October — Mihai Șubă, Romanian-Spanish grandmaster
- 22 December — Jonathan Hawkins, English grandmaster.
