= Norway Chess 2024 =

Chess tournament

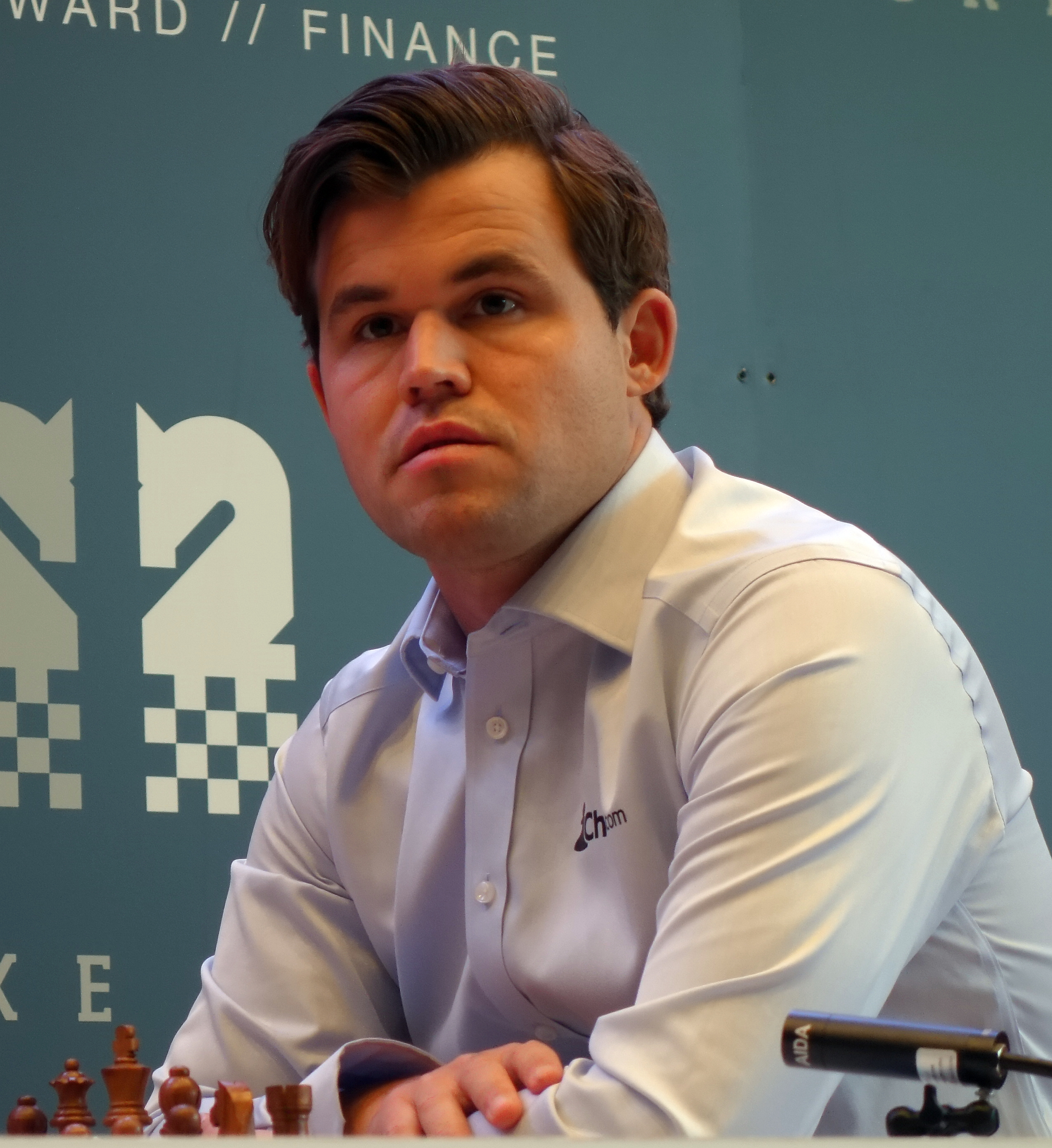
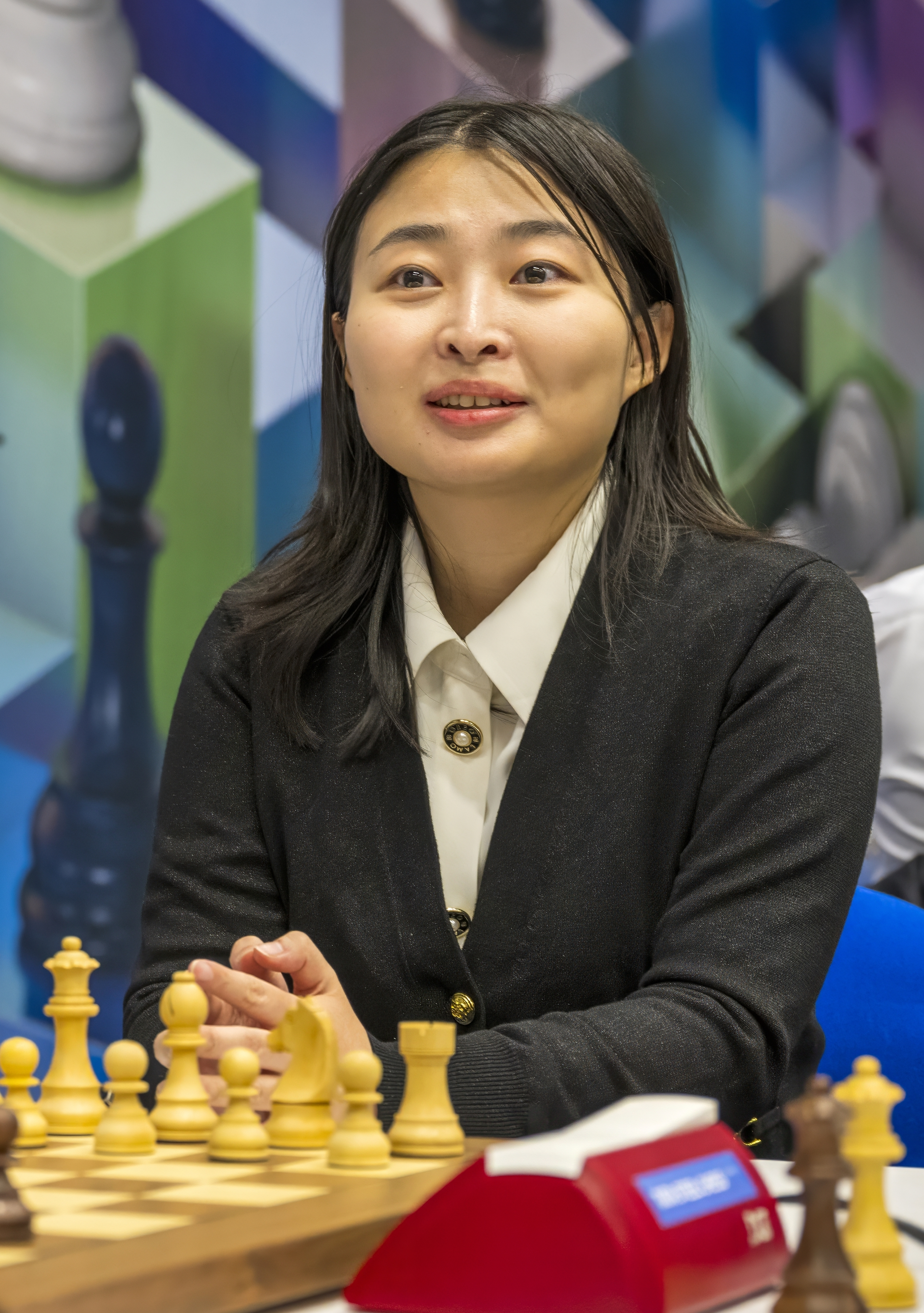
- Magnus Carlsen (left) and Ju Wenjun (right)

Tournament information
- Sport: Chess
- Location: Stavanger, Norway
- Dates: 27 May–7 June
- Participants: 6 from 5 nations (open); 6 from 4 nations (women)

Final positions
- Champions: Magnus Carlsen (NOR) (Open); Ju Wenjun (CHN) (Women)

Norway Chess 2024 was 12th edition of annual chess tournament held in Stavanger from May 27 to June 7, 2024. The field consisted of six players, including world number one and eventual winner Magnus Carlsen, world champion Ding Liren and defending champion Hikaru Nakamura. Simultaneously, an inaugural edition of Norway Chess Women took place, which included reigning women's world champion Ju Wenjun, who took the title.

== Organization ==
As well as previous editions since 2019, 2024 Norway Chess used a format that included armageddons in case of a draw in a classical game. Scoring system remained the same, victory in classical was rewarded by 3 points, 1½ points for an armageddon win, 1 points for loss in an armageddon and 0 points for classical loss.

== Participants ==
=== Open ===
Player	Rating	Ranking
Player	May 2024	
(Norway) Magnus Carlsen	2830	1
(United States) Fabiano Caruana	2805	2
(United States) Hikaru Nakamura	2794	3
(China) Ding Liren	2762	7
(India) R Praggnanandhaa	2747	14
(France) Alireza Firouzja	2737	16

=== Women ===
Player	Rating	Ranking
Player	May 2024	
(China) Ju Wenjun	2559	2
(China) Lei Tingjie	2548	3
(India) Humpy Koneru	2545	5
(Ukraine) Anna Muzychuk	2505	10
(India) Vaishali Rameshbabu	2489	13
(Sweden) Pia Cramling	2449	26

== Standings ==
=== Open Section ===
12th Norway Chess, 29 May – 7 June 2024, Stavanger, Norway, Category XXII (2779)
	Player	Rating	1	2	3	4	5	6	Points
1	Magnus Carlsen (Norway)	2830		1½ 1	0 1½	3 1½	3 1½	1½ 3	17½
2	Hikaru Nakamura (United States)	2794	1 1½		3 1	1½ 1	1½ 1	3 1	15½
3	R Praggnanandhaa (India)	2747	3 1	0 1½		1½ 1	3 1	1 1½	14½
4	Alireza Firouzja (France)	2737	0 1	1 1½	1½ 1		1½ 1½	3 1½	13½
5	Fabiano Caruana (United States)	2805	0 1	1 1½	0 1½	1 1		3 1½	11½
6	Ding Liren (China)	2762	1 0	0 1½	1½ 1	0 1	0 1		7

=== Women's Section ===
1st Norway Chess Women, 29 May – 7 June 2024, Stavanger, Norway, Category IX (2466)
	Player	Rating	1	2	3	4	5	6	Points
1	Ju Wenjun (China)	2559		1½ 1	3 1½	1½ 3	1½ 1½	3 1½	19
2	Anna Muzychuk (Ukraine)	2505	1½ 1		1 1½	1 1	1½ 3	3 1½	16
3	Lei Tingjie (China)	2548	1 0	1 1½		3 1	3 1	1½ 1½	14½
4	Vaishali Rameshbabu (India)	2489	0 1	1½ 1½	1½ 0		3 0	1 3	12½
5	Koneru Humpy (India)	2545	1 1	0 1	1½ 0	3 0		1 1½	10
6	Pia Cramling (Sweden)	2449	1 0	1 0	1 1	1 1½	0 1½		8
