= 2025 FIDE Circuit =

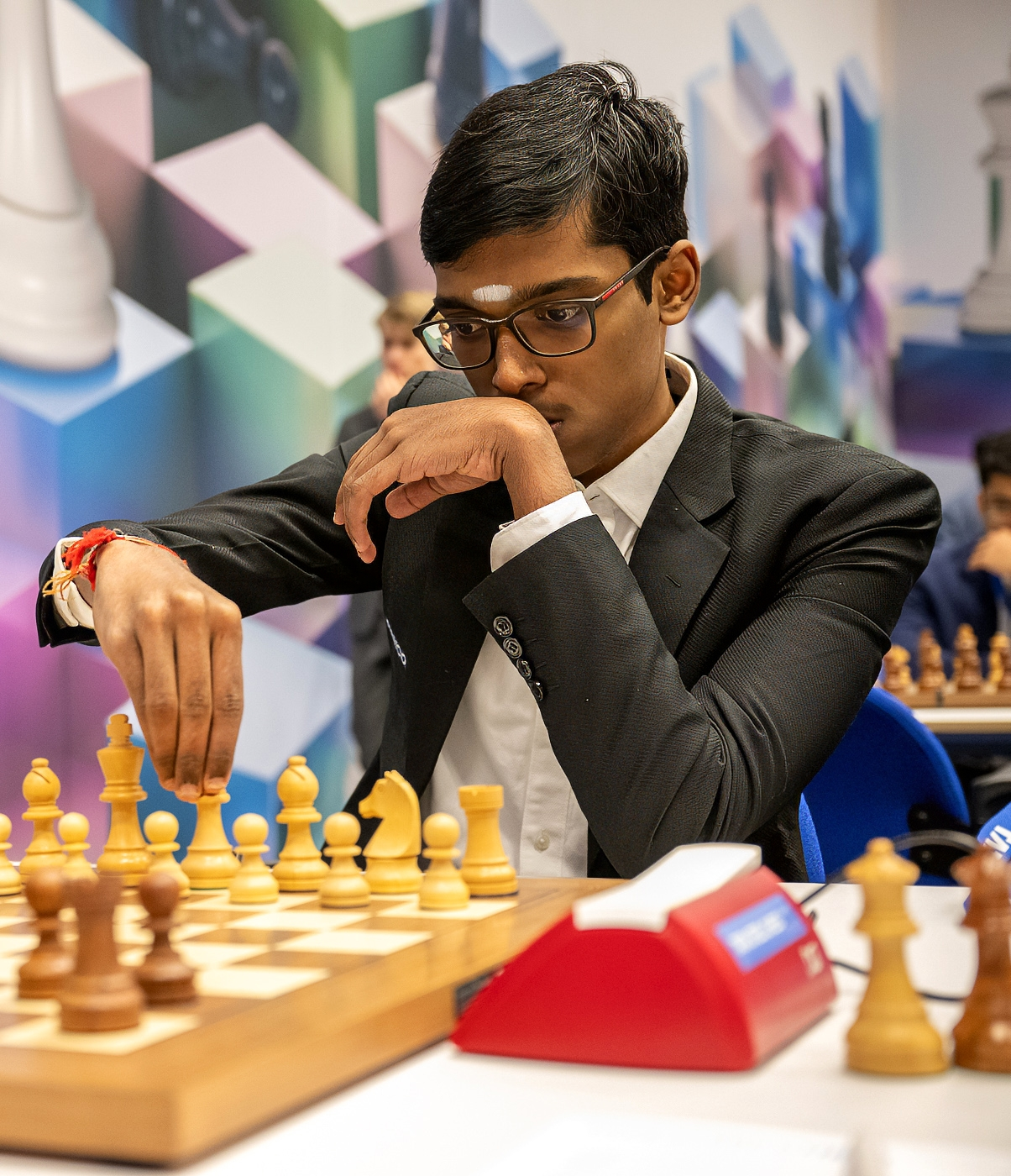
- 2025 FIDE Circuit winner R Praggnanandhaa
- Duration: 1 January 2025 – 30 December 2025 (Note: Tournaments other than national championships and zonal and continental tournaments must end by 15 December.)
- Winner: (India) R Praggnanandhaa

Seasons
- ← 2024 2026–27 →

The 2025 FIDE Circuit was a system comprising the top chess tournaments in 2025, which served as a qualification path for the Candidates Tournament 2026. Players received points based on their performance and the strength of the tournament. A player's final Circuit score was the sum of their seven best results of the year. R Praggnanandhaa scored the most points, and as winner of the 2025 Circuit qualified for the Candidates Tournament 2026.

== Tournament eligibility ==
A FIDE-rated individual standard tournament was eligible for the Circuit if it met the following criteria:

1. Finish between 1 January 2025 and 15 December 2025 (21 December for National Championships, zonal and continental tournaments, open (Note: "Open" refers to tournaments with 50 or more players.) tournaments)
2. Has at least 8 players (6 for Double Round Robin tournaments with TAR of at least 2700).
3. Has at least 7 rounds (4 rounds for knockout events).
4. The 8 highest-rated players (6 for Double Round Robin tournaments) have an average standard rating of at least 2550 (2700 for rapid and blitz tournaments besides World and Continental championships) at the start of tournament. This average is referred to as TAR (tournament average rating).
5. Players represent at least 3 national federations.
6. Not more than 50% of the 20 highest-rated players (or all players if fewer than 20) represent one federation.

The Circuit also included the following tournaments:

- 2024 World Championship
- National Championships that meet points 1 to 4 in above criteria
- 2025 World Rapid Championship
- 2025 World Blitz Championship
- 2025 Continental Rapid Championships
- 2025 Continental Blitz Championships
- Other Rapid and Blitz tournaments that met the above criteria, except that the TAR must be at least 2700.
- Double Round Robin Tournaments with 6 or more players where the TAR was at least 2700

== Points system ==
=== Event points ===
Circuit points obtained by a player from a tournament were calculated as follows:

$$P = B \times k \times w$$

where:

- $P$ - Points obtained by player from the tournament
- $B$ - Basic points
- $k$ - Tournament strength factor, calculated as $k = (TAR-2500) / 100$
- $w$ - Tournament weighting
  - 2.0 - FIDE World Championship 2024
  - 1.0 - Standard classical tournaments with at most 1 'multi game-day', a day on which multiple games are played
  - 0.9 - Double Round Robin Tournaments with 6-7 players and classical tournaments with 2 multi game-days
  - 0.8 - World Rapid Championship, Knockout Tournaments with fewer than 6 rounds and classical tournaments with 3 multi game-days
  - 0.7 - Standard classical tournaments with 4 multi game-days
  - 0.6 - World Blitz Championship, other Rapid tournaments, and classical tournaments with 5 multi game-days
  - 0.5 - Mixed Rapid & Blitz tournaments and standard classical tournaments with 6 or more multi game-days
  - 0.4 - Other blitz tournaments

If multiple weighting coefficients apply these are multiplied together.

=== Basic points ===
Basic points for a tournament were awarded depending on the tournament format:

- Swiss-system: Top 8 (within top half of ranking), ties included.
- Double round-robins 6-7 players: Top 2 with ties.
- Round-robins 8-10 players: Top 3 with ties.
- Round-robins 11-13 players: Top 4 with ties.
- Round-robins 14 players: Top 5 with ties.
- Knockout: Third round or later, up to 8 players.

Points were awarded as follows:

1st	2nd	3rd	4th	5th	6th	7th	8th
11/10	8	7	6	5	4	3	2

- 11 points for an outright winner with no tie-break criteria applied (in Knockout tournaments, victory in the Final after only the games with the longest time control have been played). Otherwise, 10 basic points will be used for calculation.
- For tied positions, basic points are calculated as 50% of points for final ranking as determined by tournament's tie-break rules, plus 50% of the sum of basic points assigned for the tied places divided by the number of tied players. If no tie-break rule is applied, basic points are shared equally among all tied players.

=== World Championship 2024 ===
For the World Championship 2024, runner-up Ding Liren received points in the 2025 Circuit equal to the basic points for 2nd place multiplied by the k-factor and multiplied by 2. The TPR for this event was calculated as the player's performance rating.

=== World Cup 2025 ===
For the World Cup 2025, the event points were equal to the normal number of event points plus the difference between the number of games won and lost (if positive, not more than 2). Anyone who was eliminated in the quarter finals of the event was deemed to have finished in 5th place for basic points, and as such all gained 5 basic points.

=== Player's total and ranking ===
Tournaments that could be included in player's results were as follows:

- Official FIDE tournaments
- National Championships
- Other eligible tournaments with minimum TAR of 2650
- At most two eligible tournaments per host country with TAR below 2650

A player's point total for the ranking was the sum of their best 7 tournaments with the following criteria:

- If player had 6 or 7 tournaments to count:
  - No more than 4 or 5 respectively standard tournaments with the participation of less than 50 players can be counted.
  - No more than 2 rapid/blitz tournaments can be counted.
- If player had 5 tournaments or less:
  - No more than 4 standard tournaments with participation of less than 50 players can be counted.
  - No more than 1 rapid/blitz tournament can be counted.

== Tournaments ==
"(M)" denotes the Masters section while "(Ch)" denotes the Challengers section.
"Open" refers to classical tournaments with 50 or more participants.

- : Ongoing event
- : Candidates Tournament qualifying event

2025 FIDE Circuit – Eligible Tournaments
Tournament	Location	Date	Type	P#	TAR	Winner
World Championship	Singapore	25 November – 13 December, 2024	FIDE	2	2754	(India) Gukesh Dommaraju
Tata Steel (M)	(Netherlands) Wijk aan Zee	17 January – 2 February	Round robin	14	2763 1/8	(India) R Praggnanandhaa
Tata Steel (Ch)	(Netherlands) Wijk aan Zee	17 January – 2 February	Round robin	14	2618 5/8	(Czech Republic) Thai Dai Van Nguyen
Azerbaijan Championship	(Azerbaijan) Baku	1–15 February	National	26	2641 3/4	(Azerbaijan) Rauf Mamedov
Al-Beruniy (M)	(Uzbekistan) Tashkent	2–12 February	Round robin	10	2624 3/8	(Uzbekistan) Mukhiddin Madaminov
Al-Beruniy (Ch)	(Uzbekistan) Tashkent	2–12 February	Round robin	10	2557 5/8	(Iran) Bardiya Daneshvar
Djerba Masters	(Tunisia) Djerba	15–23 February	Round robin	10	2644 1/8	(France) Marc'Andria Maurizzi
World Junior Championship	(Montenegro) Petrovac	23 February – 7 March	FIDE	157	2560 1/2	(India) Pranav V
Prague (M)	(Czech Republic) Prague	25 February – 7 March	Round robin	10	2721 1/4	(India) Aravindh Chithambaram
Prague (Ch)	(Czech Republic) Prague	25 February – 7 March	Round robin	10	2584	(Uzbekistan) Nodirbek Yakubboev
Aeroflot Open	(Russia) Moscow	28 February – 7 March	Open	140	2704 5/8	(FIDE) Ian Nepomniachtchi
European Individual Championship	(Romania) Eforie	14–27 March	Continental	375	2671 5/8	(Germany) Matthias Blübaum
Agzamov Memorial	(Uzbekistan) Tashkent	19–30 March	Open	158	2643 5/8	(India) Nihal Sarin
Reykjavik Open	(Iceland) Reykjavík	9–15 April	Open	419	2612 3/4	(Iran) Parham Maghsoodloo
Open Internacional Alicante	(Spain) Alicante	16–21 April	Open	557	2599 7/8	(FIDE) Volodar Murzin
Grenke Open	(Germany) Karlsruhe	16–21 April	Open	875	2638 3/8	(India) Aswath S
Spring Chess Classic	(United States) St. Louis	21–30 April	Round robin	10	2585 1/4	(United States) Andrew Hong
Menorca Open	(Spain) Menorca	22–27 April	Open	326	2644	(Ukraine) Vasyl Ivanchuk
GCT Superbet Rapid & Blitz Poland	(Poland) Warsaw	24 April – 1 May	Rapid & Blitz	10	2741	(Slovenia) Vladimir Fedoseev
Sardinia World Chess Festival	(Italy) Orosei, Sardinia	26 April – 4 May	Open	107	2593 1/4	(United States) Christopher Yoo
Baku Open	(Azerbaijan) Baku	27 April – 6 May	Open	68	2591 5/8	(Serbia) Aleksandar Indjic
Ljubljana Chess Festival	(Slovenia) Ljubljana	28 April – 4 May	Open	165	2559 3/8	(Slovenia) Jan Šubelj
GCT Superbet Classic Romania	(Romania) Bucharest	6–17 May	Round robin	10	2760 3/4	(India) R Praggnanandhaa
Asian Individual Championship	(United Arab Emirates) Al Ain	7–15 May	Continental	157	2652 1/2	(Iran) Bardiya Daneshvar
German Championship	(Germany) Munich	15–23 May	National	10	2636 5/8	(Germany) Vincent Keymer
Sharjah Masters	(United Arab Emirates) Sharjah	17–25 May	Open	82	2690 3/8	(Netherlands) Anish Giri
TePe Sigeman	(Sweden) Malmö	20–26 May	Round robin	8	2647	(Uzbekistan) Javokhir Sindarov
American Continental Championship	(Brazil) Foz do Iguaçu	23–31 May	Continental	218	2606 1/8	(United States) Sam Shankland
Norway Chess	(Norway) Stavanger	26 May – 6 June	Double round robin	6	2790 2/3	(Norway) Magnus Carlsen
Dubai Open	(United Arab Emirates) Dubai	27 May – 4 June	Open	82	2620 1/4	(FIDE) Aleksey Grebnev
Stepan Avagyan Memorial	(Armenia) Jermuk	28 May – 6 June	Round robin	10	2678 3/4	(India) Aravindh Chithambaram
Delhi International Open	(India) New Delhi	7–14 June	Open	343	2550 1/2	(India) Abhijeet Gupta
Munich Whitsun Open	(Germany) Munich	8–14 June	Open	152	2594 1/8	(Norway) Elham Amar
UzChess Cup (M)	(Uzbekistan) Tashkent	18–27 June	Round robin	10	2742 1/8	(India) R Praggnanandhaa
UzChess Cup (Ch)	(Uzbekistan) Tashkent	18–27 June	Round robin	10	2582 1/8	(Greece) Nikolas Theodorou
Vladimir Dvorkovich Memorial – Aktobe Open	(Kazakhstan) Aktobe	20 June – 1 July	Open	80	2652 5/8	(Serbia) Alexey Sarana
GCT SuperUnited Rapid & Blitz Croatia	(Croatia) Zagreb	2–7 July	Rapid & Blitz	10	2776	(Norway) Magnus Carlsen
Biel Masters Tournament Open	(Switzerland) Biel/Bienne	12–24 July	Open	112	2564 1/2	(India) Karthikeyan Murali
Karpov International Chess Tournament	(Russia) Khanty-Mansiysk	14–26 July	Round Robin	10	2655 3/4	(Iran) Amin Tabatabaei
Dole Open	(France) Aix-en-Provence	19–27 July	Open	272	2635 3/4	(India) P. Iniyan
Oskemen Open	(Kazakhstan) Oskemen	20–30 July	Open	77	2603 1/8	(FIDE) Aleksey Grebnev
Czech Open	(Czech Republic) Pardubice	25 July – 2 August	Open	202	2562 5/8	(Germany) Alexander Donchenko
British Chess Championship	(United Kingdom) Liverpool	2–10 August	National	99	2561	(England) Michael Adams
Dortmund Sparkassen Chess Open	(Germany) Dortmund	2–10 August	Open	196	2582 5/8	(Germany) Matthias Blübaum
Chennai Grand Masters	(India) Chennai	7–16 August	Round robin	10	2718 1/4	(Germany) Vincent Keymer
Rubinstein Memorial	(Poland) Polanica-Zdrój	15–24 August	Round robin	10	2657 3/8	(Uzbekistan) Nodirbek Yakubboev
Abu Dhabi Masters	(United Arab Emirates) Abu Dhabi	15–24 August	Open	195	2594 3/4	(FIDE) Denis Lazavik
GCT Sinquefield Cup	(United States) St. Louis	18–28 August	Round robin	10	2761 3/4	(United States) Wesley So
Fujairah Global Championship	(United Arab Emirates) Fujairah	25 August – 2 September	Open	44	2660	(India) Pranav V
FIDE Grand Swiss	(Uzbekistan) Samarkand	3–15 September	FIDE	116	2758 1/4	(Netherlands) Anish Giri
Russian Championship	(Russia) Moscow	1–12 October	National	12	2625 1/8	(FIDE) Arseniy Nesterov
U.S. Championship	(United States) St. Louis	11–25 October	National	12	2717 1/4	(United States) Fabiano Caruana
FIDE World Cup	(India) Goa	1–27 November	FIDE	206	2758 3/4	(Uzbekistan) Javokhir Sindarov
KazChess Masters	(Kazakhstan) Almaty	21–29 November	Round robin	10	2601	(Serbia) Alexey Sarana
U.S. Masters	(United States) Charlotte	26–30 November	Open	250	2615 1/8	(United States) Awonder Liang
London Chess Classic – Open	(United Kingdom) London	26 November – 3 December	Open	120	2608 7/8	(India) R Praggnanandhaa (Serbia) Velimir Ivić (England) Ameet Ghasi
London Chess Classic	(United Kingdom) London	26 November – 5 December	Round robin	10	2678 3/8	(Uzbekistan) Nodirbek Abdusattorov
European Rapid Championship	(Kosovo) Pristina	27 – 29 November	Rapid; Continental	369	2644 3/8	(Lithuania) Paulius Pultinevičius
European Blitz Championship	(Kosovo) Pristina	30 November – 1 December	Blitz; Continental	369	2644 3/8	(Netherlands) Jorden van Foreest
Kazakhstan Chess Cup	(Kazakhstan) Almaty	1 – 12 December	Round robin	12	2593 1/2	(Armenia) Aram Hakobyan
President Cup (M)	(Uzbekistan) Tashkent	3–12 December	Round robin	10	2641 1/2	(India) Nihal Sarin
World Rapid Championship	(Qatar) Doha	25–28 December	Rapid; FIDE	247	2777 7/8	(Norway) Magnus Carlsen
World Blitz Championship	(Qatar) Doha	29–30 December	Blitz; FIDE	252	2777 7/8	(Norway) Magnus Carlsen

== Ranking ==
At the end of 2025, the best player in the Circuit qualified the Candidates Tournament 2026, provided that they played in at least 5 tournaments (including at least 4 in standard time controls) and he played at least 2 standard tournaments with participations of more than 50 players (if they played in 6 or 7 tournaments) or at least 1 standard tournament with participations of more than 50 players (if they played in 5 tournaments).

Tournament results which can't be counted for qualification for the Candidates Tournament 2026 are marked in pink. "(M)" denotes the Masters section of tournaments while "(Ch)" denotes the Challengers section.

- : Current leader – set to qualify for Candidates Tournament 2026 (Next top leader if the current top player has already qualified through other route)
- : Current World Champion – ineligible for Candidates Tournament 2026 qualification
- : Player qualified for Candidates Tournament 2026 via another path
- : Player ineligible for Candidates Tournament 2026 qualification

Final 2025 Rankings
No.	Player	Points	Events	1	2	3	4	5	6	7	8
1	(India) R Praggnanandhaa	115.17	7	(Netherlands) Tata Steel (M); 1st – 25.00	GCT Romania Classic; 1st – 23.90	(Armenia) Avagyan Memorial; 2nd – 15.19	(Uzbekistan) UzChess (M); 1st – 22.19	(United States) Sinquefield Cup; T 2nd-3rd – 20.72	(FIDE) World Cup; R4 – 0.00	(United Kingdom) London (Open); T 1st-3rd – 8.17	
2	(Uzbekistan) Nodirbek Abdusattorov	84.95	7	(Netherlands) Tata Steel (M); 3rd – 18.42	(United Arab Emirates) Sharjah; 3rd – 13.80	(Uzbekistan) UzChess (M); 3rd – 18.56	(FIDE) Grand Swiss; 10th – 1.21	(FIDE) World Cup; R3 – 0.00	(United Kingdom) London; 1st – 19.62	(FIDE) World Blitz; 2nd – 13.34	
3	(Netherlands) Anish Giri	82.43	6	(Netherlands) Tata Steel (M); T 5th-6th – 6.58	(Czech Republic) Prague (M); T 2nd-4th – 11.06	(United Arab Emirates) Sharjah; 1st – 20.94	GCT Croatia R&B; 7th – 0.00	(India) Chennai; 2nd – 14.19	(FIDE) Grand Swiss; 1st – 28.41	(FIDE) World Rapid; T 9th-13th – 1.25	
4	(United States) Fabiano Caruana	76.39	4	(Netherlands) Tata Steel (M); 9th – 0.00	GCT Romania Classic; 4th – 0.00	(Norway) Stavanger; 2nd – 20.93	GCT Croatia R&B; 8th – 0.00	(United States) Sinquefield Cup; T 2nd-3rd – 20.72	(United States) U.S. Champ; 1st – 23.90	(FIDE) World Blitz; T 3rd-4th – 10.84	
5	(Uzbekistan) Javokhir Sindarov	68.40	5	(Sweden) Malmö; 1st – 16.17	(Uzbekistan) UzChess (M); 2nd – 19.77	(FIDE) Grand Swiss; 24th – 0.00	(FIDE) World Cup; 1st – 27.88	(FIDE) World Rapid; 7th – 4.58	(FIDE) World Blitz; 14th – 0.00		
6	(Germany) Matthias Blübaum	63.94	6	(FIDE) European Champ; 1st – 15.73	(Germany) German Champ; 2nd – 10.93	(Germany) Dortmund; 1st – 6.89	(Poland) Rubinstein Memorial; 3rd – 11.02	(FIDE) Grand Swiss; 2nd – 19.37	(FIDE) World Cup; R4 – 0.00		
7	(India) Arjun Erigaisi	60.26	5	(Netherlands) Tata Steel (M); 10th – 0.00	(Norway) Stavanger; 5th – 0.00	(India) Chennai; 3rd – 13.10	(FIDE) Grand Swiss; 6th – 6.37	(FIDE) World Cup; QF – 14.94	(FIDE) World Rapid; 3rd – 15.01	(FIDE) World Blitz; T 3rd-4th – 10.84	
8	(India) Nihal Sarin	56.50	8	(Uzbekistan) Tashkent Open; 1st – 15.80	(Spain) Menorca; 8th – 1.23	(FIDE) Asian Champ; 2nd – 12.96	(United Arab Emirates) Dubai Open; 6th – 3.49	(United Arab Emirates) Fujairah; T 9th-12th – 1.40	(FIDE) Grand Swiss; 9th – 1.21	(Uzbekistan) President Cup; 1st – 15.57	(FIDE) World Blitz; 7th – 4.84
9	(Germany) Vincent Keymer	55.83	4	(Netherlands) Tata Steel (M); 8th – 0.00	(Czech Republic) Prague (M); 5th – 0.00	(Germany) German Champ; 1st – 15.03	(India) Chennai; 1st – 24.01	(FIDE) Grand Swiss; 4th – 16.79	(FIDE) World Cup; R4 – 0.00	(FIDE) World Rapid; 50th – 0.00	
10	(Norway) Magnus Carlsen	53.23	2	(Norway) Stavanger; 1st – 28.78	GCT Croatia R&B; 1st – 15.18	(FIDE) World Rapid; 1st – 24.45	(FIDE) World Blitz; 1st – 18.34				
11	(France) Alireza Firouzja	52.99	3	GCT Poland R&B; 5th – 0.00	GCT Romania Classic; T 2nd-3rd – 20.64	GCT Croatia R&B; T 4th-5th – 0.00	(United States) Sinquefield Cup; 9th – 0.00	(FIDE) Grand Swiss; 3rd – 18.08	(United Kingdom) London; 2nd – 14.27	(FIDE) World Rapid; 30th – 0.00	
12	(United States) Wesley So	52.41	4	GCT Romania Classic; T 6th-9th – 0.00	GCT Croatia R&B; 2nd – 11.04	(United States) Sinquefield Cup; 1st – 23.99	(United States) U.S. Champ; 2nd – 17.38	(FIDE) World Cup; R2 – 0.00	(FIDE) World Rapid; 8th – 3.47	(FIDE) World Blitz; 6th – 5.67	
13	(Uzbekistan) Nodirbek Yakubboev	50.55	6	(Netherlands) Tata Steel (Ch); T 4th-5th – 6.52	(Czech Republic) Prague (Ch); 1st – 7.98	(FIDE) Asian Champ; 15th – 0.00	(Armenia) Avagyan Memorial; 6th – 0.00	(Poland) Rubinstein Memorial; 1st – 17.31	(FIDE) Grand Swiss; 14th – 1.21	(FIDE) World Cup; 4th – 17.53	
14	(France) Maxime Vachier-Lagrave	43.69	5	GCT Poland R&B; 2nd – 9.64	GCT Romania Classic; T 2nd-3rd – 20.64	(United States) Sinquefield Cup; T 5th-7th – 0.00	(FIDE) Grand Swiss; 16th – 1.21	(FIDE) World Cup; R4 – 0.00	(FIDE) World Rapid; 6th – 5.70	(FIDE) World Blitz; 5th – 6.50	
15	(Iran) Amin Tabatabaei	41.36	6	(Russia) Aeroflot Open; 6th – 6.85	(FIDE) Asian Champ; 79th – 0.00	(United Arab Emirates) Sharjah; 6th – 6.98	(Russia) Khanty-Mansiysk; 1st – 17.13	(United Arab Emirates) Fujairah; 4th – 10.40	(FIDE) Grand Swiss; 36th – 0.00	(FIDE) World Rapid; 44th – 0.00	
16	(India) Aravindh Chithambaram	41.32	3	(Czech Republic) Prague (M); 1st – 24.34	GCT Poland R&B; 8th – 0.00	(Armenia) Avagyan Memorial; 1st – 16.98	(Uzbekistan) UzChess (M); 10th – 0.00	(Poland) Rubinstein Memorial; 5th – 0.00	(FIDE) World Cup; R2 – 0.00	(FIDE) World Rapid; 16th – 0.00	
17	(China) Ding Liren	40.64	1	(FIDE) World Champ; 2nd – 40.64							
18	(FIDE) Andrey Esipenko	40.64	5	(Russia) Aeroflot; 3rd – 9.31	(FIDE) Grand Swiss; 19th – 1.21	(Russia) Russian Champ; T 2nd-4th – 8.76	(FIDE) World Cup; 3rd – 20.11	(FIDE) World Rapid; T 9th-13th – 1.25	(FIDE) World Blitz; 35th – 0.00		
19	(China) Wei Yi	40.34	3	(Netherlands) Tata Steel (M); T 5th-6th – 6.58	(Czech Republic) Prague (M); T 2nd-4th – 11.06	(Norway) Stavanger; 6th – 0.00	(FIDE) World Cup; 2nd – 22.70				
20	(Serbia) Aleksandar Inđić	34.13	7	(Uzbekistan) Tashkent Open; 7th – 2.69	(Germany) Grenke Open; 15th – 0.00	(Azerbaijan) Baku Open; 1st – 10.08	(United Arab Emirates) Sharjah; 2nd – 14.75	(United Arab Emirates) Dubai Open; 5th – 6.61	(FIDE) Grand Swiss; 70th – 0.00	(FIDE) World Cup; R2 – 0.00	
21	(Iran) Bardiya Daneshvar	33.39	7	(Uzbekistan) Al-Beruniy (Ch); 1st – 6.34	(Russia) Aeroflot Open; 9th – 3.58	(Uzbekistan) Tashkent Open; 4th – 8.98	(FIDE) Asian Champ; 1st – 14.49	(United Arab Emirates) Sharjah; 15th – 0.00	(United Arab Emirates) Fujairah; 17th – 0.00	(FIDE) World Cup; R2 – 0.00	
22	(Mexico) José Martínez Alcántara	32.90	3	(FIDE) American Continental Champ; 2nd – 6.76	(United Arab Emirates) Fujairah; 3rd – 11.20	(FIDE) World Cup; QF – 14.94	(FIDE) World Rapid; 95th – 0.00	(FIDE) World Blitz; 240th – 0.00			
23	(India) Gukesh Dommaraju	32.03	4	(Netherlands) Tata Steel (M); 2nd – 22.37	GCT Romania Classic; T 6th-9th – 0.00	(Norway) Stavanger; 3rd – 0.00	GCT Croatia R&B; 3rd – 9.66	(United States) Sinquefield Cup; 8th – 0.00	(FIDE) Grand Swiss; 41st – 0.00	(FIDE) World Cup; R3 – 0.00	
24	(Uzbekistan) Mukhiddin Madaminov	31.76	7	(Uzbekistan) Al-Beruniy (M); 1st – 13.68	(Uzbekistan) Tashkent Open; 16th – 0.54	(FIDE) Asian Champ; 22nd – 0.00	(United Arab Emirates) Sharjah; 66th – 0.00	(Uzbekistan) UzChess (Ch); 2nd – 6.57	(FIDE) Grand Swiss; 107th – 0.00	(Uzbekistan) President Cup; 2nd – 10.97	
25	(FIDE) Aleksey Grebnev	30.04	7	(FIDE) World Junior Champ; 6th – 2.57	(FIDE) Asian Champ; 14th – 0.00	(United Arab Emirates) Dubai Open; 1st – 11.42	(Kazakhstan) Oskemen Open; 1st – 9.80	(United Arab Emirates) Abu Dhabi; 4th – 6.25	(United Arab Emirates) Fujairah; 22nd – 0.00	(FIDE) World Cup; R5 – 0.00	
