= Grand Chess Tour 2025 =

Series of chess tournaments

2025 Grand Chess Tour
- 2025
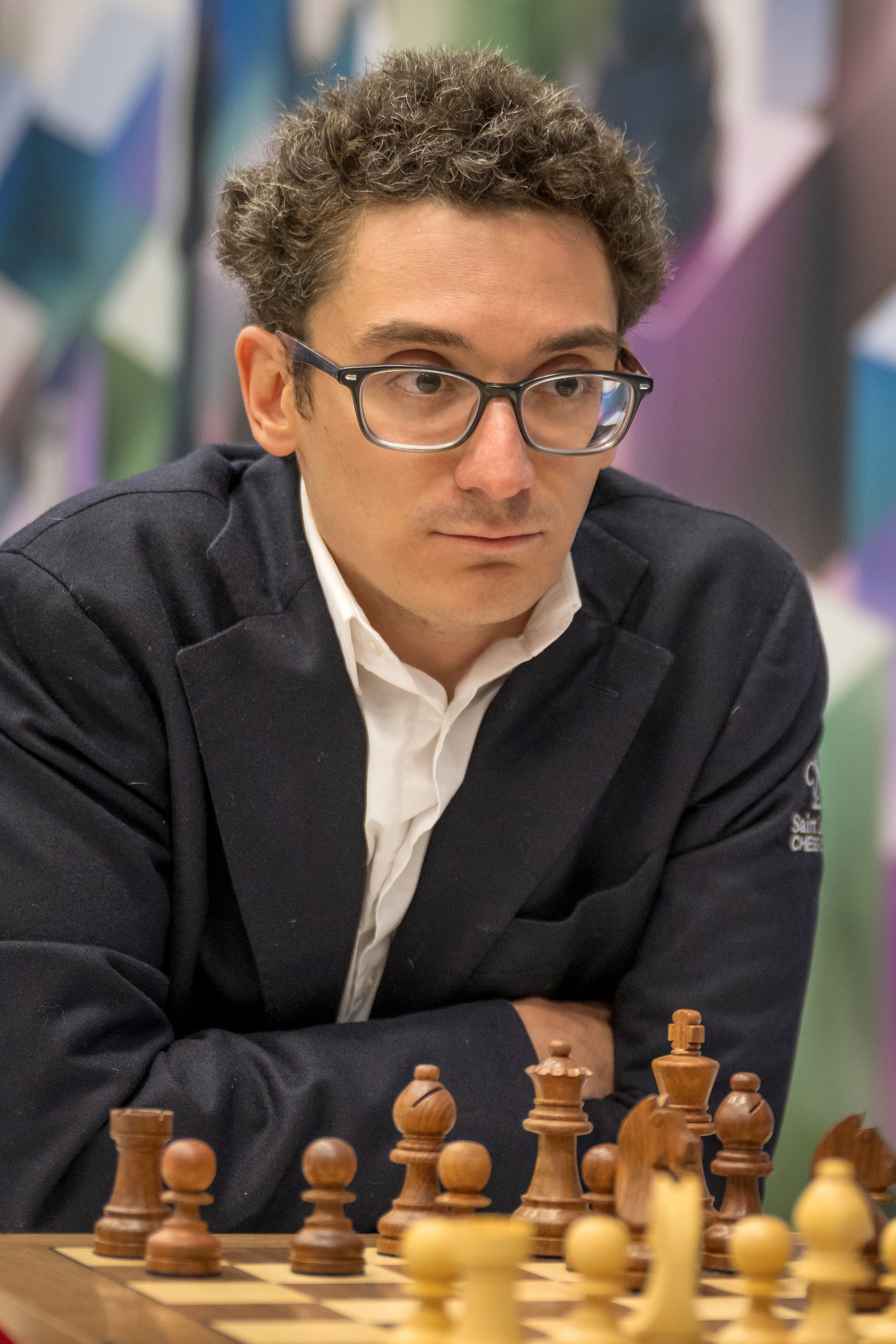
- Fabiano Caruana, the winner of the Grand Chess Tour 2025

Tournament information
- Dates: April 26–October 4
- Host(s): Warsaw, Poland; Bucharest, Romania; Zagreb, Croatia; St. Louis, United States; São Paulo, Brazil

Final positions
- Champion: (United States) Fabiano Caruana
- Runner-up: (France) Maxime Vachier-Lagrave
- 3rd place: (United States) Levon Aronian

Tournament statistics
- Prize money leader: (United States) Fabiano Caruana ($289,167)
- Points leader: (France) Maxime Vachier-Lagrave (33)

The Grand Chess Tour 2025 was a series of chess tournaments, which was the tenth edition of the Grand Chess Tour. It consisted of six tournaments with a total prize pool of US$1.6 million, including two tournaments with classical time control and three tournaments with faster time controls, as well as the GCT Finals in São Paulo, which was held for the first time since 2019.

== Format ==
The tour consisted of six tournaments. Rapid & Blitz tournaments consist of two parts – rapid (2 points for win, 1 for draw) and blitz (1 point for win, 0.5 for draw). Combined result for both portions will count in overall standings. The top four after 5 tournaments will qualify to the tour finals in São Paulo.

In the finals, players will play matches consisting of 2 classical games, 2 rapid games and 4 blitz games. 6 points will be awarded for a win, 3 points for a draw and 0 points for a loss in classical play. In the rapid games, 4 points will be awarded for a win, 2 points for a draw, and 0 points for a loss. In the blitz games, 2 points were awarded for a win, 1 point for a draw and 0 point for a loss.

The tour points were awarded as follows:

Place	Tour Points	Classical prize money	Rapid & Blitz prize money	GCT Finals prize money
1st	12/13*	$100,000	$40,000	$150,000
2nd	10	$65,000	$30,000	$100,000
3rd	8	$48,000	$25,000	$60,000
4th	7	$32,000	$20,000	$40,000
5th	6	$26,000	$15,000	
6th	5	$21,000	$11,000	
7th	4	$18,500	$10,000	
8th	3	$16,000	$9,000	
9th	2	$13,000	$8,000	
10th	1	$10,500	$7,000	

- If a player wins 1st place outright (without the need for a playoff), they are awarded 13 points instead of 12.
- Tour points and prize money are shared equally between tied players.

== Lineup ==
The lineup for the tour was announced on February 26, 2025. It consists of nine players, including the top-three finishers of the previous edition. The remaining six players were selected based on several factors, including URS rating, FIDE rating, "fighting spirit and sportsmanship".

Player	Country	FIDE rating (February 2025)
Fabiano Caruana	United States	2803
Gukesh Dommaraju	India	2777
Nodirbek Abdusattorov	Uzbekistan	2766
Alireza Firouzja	France	2760
Wesley So	United States	2745
Levon Aronian	United States	2745
R Praggnanandhaa	India	2741
Jan-Krzysztof Duda	Poland	2739
Maxime Vachier-Lagrave	France	2729

== Results ==
=== Tournament results ===
Dates	Tournament Name	Format	Host city	Winner	Runner-up	Third place
April 26–30, 2025	Superbet Rapid & Blitz Poland	Rapid & blitz	Warsaw	(Slovenia) Vladimir Fedoseev (WC)	(France) Maxime Vachier-Lagrave	(India) R Praggnanandhaa
May 7–16, 2025	Superbet Chess Classic Romania	Classical	Bucharest	(India) R Praggnanandhaa	Alireza Firouzja (France) Maxime Vachier-Lagrave	—
July 2–6, 2025	SuperUnited Rapid & Blitz Croatia	Rapid & blitz	Zagreb	(Norway) Magnus Carlsen (WC)	(United States) Wesley So	(India) Gukesh Dommaraju
August 11–15, 2025	Saint Louis Rapid & Blitz	Rapid & blitz	St. Louis	(United States) Levon Aronian	(United States) Fabiano Caruana	(France) Maxime Vachier-Lagrave
August 18–28, 2025	Sinquefield Cup	Classical	St. Louis	(United States) Wesley So	(India) R Praggnanandhaa (United States) Fabiano Caruana	—
September 26–October 4, 2025	GCT Finals	Classical, Rapid & Blitz	São Paulo	(United States) Fabiano Caruana	(France) Maxime Vachier-Lagrave	(United States) Levon Aronian

=== Tour rankings ===
The wildcards (in italics) are not counted in overall standings.

	Player	POL	ROU	CRO	STL	SIN	Total points	Finals	Prize money
1	Fabiano Caruana (United States)	—N/a	7	3.5	10	10	30.5	1st	$289,167
2	Maxime Vachier-Lagrave (France)	10	10	—N/a	8	5	33	2nd	$244,500
3	Levon Aronian (United States)	7	3.5	—N/a	13	7	30.5	3rd	$169,125
4	R Praggnanandhaa (India)	8	10	2	—N/a	10	30	4th	$218,334
5	Wesley So (United States)	—N/a	3.5	10	6	10	29.5	—N/a	$139,792
6	Alireza Firouzja (France)	6	10	6.5	—N/a	2	24.5	—N/a	$113,166
T-7	Nodirbek Abdusattorov (Uzbekistan)	—N/a	6	5	7	1	19	—N/a	$67,500
T-7	Gukesh Dommaraju (India)	—N/a	3.5	8	4.5	3	19	—N/a	$68,625
9	Jan-Krzysztof Duda (Poland)	3.5	1	6.5	—N/a	5	16	—N/a	$59,333

Event wildcards
	Player	POL	ROU	CRO	STL	SIN	Total points	Finals	Prize money
—N/a	Vladimir Fedoseev (Slovenia)	13	—N/a	—N/a	—N/a	—N/a	13	—N/a	$40,000
—N/a	Magnus Carlsen (Norway)	—N/a	—N/a	13	—N/a	—N/a	13	—N/a	$40,000
—N/a	Bogdan-Daniel Deac (Romania)	5	3.5	—N/a	—N/a	—N/a	8.5	—N/a	$28,125
—N/a	Samuel Sevian (United States)	—N/a	—N/a	—N/a	—N/a	5	5	—N/a	$21,833
—N/a	Lê Quang Liêm (Vietnam)	—N/a	—N/a	—N/a	4.5	—N/a	4.5	—N/a	$10,500
—N/a	Aravindh Chithambaram (India)	3.5	—N/a	—N/a	—N/a	—N/a	3.5	—N/a	$9,500
—N/a	Anish Giri (Netherlands)	—N/a	—N/a	3.5	—N/a	—N/a	3.5	—N/a	$9,500
—N/a	Leinier Domínguez (United States)	—N/a	—N/a	—N/a	3	—N/a	3	—N/a	$9,000
—N/a	David Gavrilescu (Romania)	2	—N/a	—N/a	—N/a	—N/a	2	—N/a	$8,000
—N/a	Grigoriy Oparin (United States)	—N/a	—N/a	—N/a	2	—N/a	2	—N/a	$8,000
—N/a	Veselin Topalov (Bulgaria)	1	—N/a	—N/a	—N/a	—N/a	1	—N/a	$7,000
—N/a	Ivan Šarić (Croatia)	—N/a	—N/a	1	—N/a	—N/a	1	—N/a	$7,000
—N/a	Sam Shankland (United States)	—N/a	—N/a	—N/a	1	—N/a	1	—N/a	$7,000

== Tournaments ==
=== Superbet Rapid & Blitz Poland ===
The first leg of the Grand Chess Tour was held in Warsaw, Poland from April 26–30. Vladimir Fedoseev won the tournament with three rounds to spare, while Vachier-Lagrave took the tour lead. Praggnanandhaa's third place finish saw him take the lead in the 2025 FIDE Circuit standings, surpassing Ding Liren.

2025 GCT Superbet Rapid & Blitz Poland, April 26–30 Warsaw, Poland
	Player	Rapid	Blitz	Total	TB	Tour Points	Prize money	Circuit
1	Vladimir Fedoseev (SLO)	11	15½	26½		WC (13)	$40,000	13.26
2	Maxime Vachier-Lagrave (FRA)	9	12½	21½		10	$30,000	9.64
3	R Praggnanandhaa (IND)	10	10½	20½		8	$25,000	8.44
4	Levon Aronian (USA)	10	10	20		7	$20,000	
5	Alireza Firouzja (FRA)	11	7½	19½		6	$15,000	
6	Bogdan-Daniel Deac (ROU)	8	10	18		WC (5)	$11,000	
T-7	Jan-Krzysztof Duda (POL)	8	9	17		3.5	$9,500	
T-7	Aravindh Chithambaram (IND)	11	6	17		WC (3.5)	$9,500	
9	David Gavrilescu (ROU)	7	4	11		WC (2)	$8,000	
10	Veselin Topalov (BUL)	5	5	10		WC (1)	$7,000	

2025 GCT Superbet Rapid & Blitz Poland – Rapid, April 26–28 Warsaw, Poland
	Player	Rating	1	2	3	4	5	6	7	8	9	10	Points
1	Vladimir Fedoseev (SLO)	2739		1	1	1	1	1	1	2	2	1	11
2	Aravindh Chithambaram (IND)	2550	1		2	0	2	0	1	2	1	2	11
3	Alireza Firouzja (FRA)	2754	1	0		2	1	1	2	1	1	2	11
4	R Praggnanandhaa (IND)	2684	1	2	0		1	2	0	2	2	0	10
5	Levon Aronian (USA)	2752	1	0	1	1		1	2	1	1	2	10
6	Maxime Vachier-Lagrave (FRA)	2745	1	2	1	0	1		1	1	2	0	9
7	Bogdan-Daniel Deac (ROU)	2630	1	1	0	2	0	1		0	1	2	8
8	Jan-Krzysztof Duda (POL)	2731	0	0	1	0	1	1	2		1	2	8
9	David Gavrilescu (ROU)	2506	0	1	1	0	1	0	1	1		2	7
10	Veselin Topalov (BUL)	2632	1	0	0	2	0	2	0	0	0		5

2025 GCT Superbet Rapid & Blitz Poland – Blitz, April 29–30 Warsaw, Poland
	Player	Rating	1	2	3	4	5	6	7	8	9	10	Points
1	Vladimir Fedoseev (SLO)	2675		1 1	½ 1	1 ½	1 1	1 0	½ 1	1 1	1 1	1 1	15½
2	Maxime Vachier-Lagrave (FRA)	2748	0 0		0 1	1 1	1 ½	0 1	1 ½	½ 1	1 1	1 1	12½
3	R Praggnanandhaa (IND)	2717	½ 0	1 0		0 0	0 0	0 1	1 1	1 1	1 1	1 1	10½
4	Bogdan-Daniel Deac (ROU)	2629	0 ½	0 0	1 1		1 ½	1 ½	½ 1	0 0	1 1	½ ½	10
5	Levon Aronian (USA)	2761	0 0	0 ½	1 1	0 ½		0 ½	1 0	½ 1	1 1	1 1	10
6	Jan-Krzysztof Duda (POL)	2785	0 1	1 0	1 0	0 ½	1 ½		1 0	0 1	0 0	1 1	9
7	Alireza Firouzja (FRA)	2857	½ 0	0 ½	0 0	½ 0	0 1	0 1		1 1	0 1	1 0	7½
8	Aravindh Chithambaram (IND)	2622	0 0	½ 0	0 0	1 1	½ 0	1 0	0 0		0 1	½ ½	6
9	Veselin Topalov (BUL)	2657	0 0	0 0	0 0	0 0	0 0	1 1	1 0	1 0		0 1	5
10	David Gavrilescu (ROU)	2506	0 0	0 0	0 0	½ ½	0 0	0 0	0 1	½ ½	1 0		4

=== Superbet Chess Classic Romania ===
The second leg of the 2025 Grand Chess Tour was held in Bucharest, Romania from May 7–16. Praggnanandhaa won the tournament in playoffs, while Vachier-Lagrave continued to lead the tour standings.

2025 GCT Superbet Chess Classic, May 7–16 Bucharest, Romania
	Player	Rating	1	2	3	4	5	6	7	8	9	10	Points	TB	Tour Points	Prize money	Circuit
1	R Praggnanandhaa (IND)	2758		½	½	½	1	1	½	½	½	½	5½	1½	10	$77,666	23.90
2	Alireza Firouzja (FRA)	2757	½		1	0	½	½	½	1	1	½	5½	1	10	$67,666	20.64
3	Maxime Vachier-Lagrave (FRA)	2723	½	0		½	½	1	½	½	1	1	5½	½	10	$67,666	20.64
4	Fabiano Caruana (USA)	2776	½	1	½		½	½	½	½	½	½	5		7	$32,000	
5	Nodirbek Abdusattorov (UZB)	2771	0	½	½	½		½	½	½	½	1	4½		6	$26,000	
6	Wesley So (USA)	2751	0	½	0	½	½		½	1	½	½	4		3.5	$17,125	
7	Levon Aronian (USA)	2747	½	½	½	½	½	½		0	0	1	4		3.5	$17,125	
8	Bogdan-Daniel Deac (ROU)	2668	½	0	½	½	½	0	1		½	½	4		WC (3.5)	$17,125	
9	Gukesh Dommaraju (IND)	2787	½	0	0	½	½	½	1	½		½	4		3.5	$17,125	
10	Jan-Krzysztof Duda (POL)	2739	½	½	0	½	0	½	0	½	½		3		1	$10,500	

First place play-off
	Player	Blitz rating	1	2	3	Score
1	R Praggnanandhaa (IND)	2717		½	1	1½
2	Alireza Firouzja (FRA)	2857	½		½	1
3	Maxime Vachier-Lagrave (FRA)	2748	0	½		½

=== SuperUnited Rapid & Blitz Croatia ===
The third leg of the Grand Chess Tour was held in Zagreb, Croatia from July 2–6. Magnus Carlsen won the tournament with one round to spare, while Vachier-Lagrave maintained the tour lead.

2025 GCT SuperUnited Rapid & Blitz Croatia, July 2–6 Zagreb, Croatia
	Player	Rapid	Blitz	Total	TB	Tour Points	Prize money	Circuit
1	Magnus Carlsen (NOR)	10	12½	22½		WC (13)	$40,000	15.18
2	Wesley So (USA)	8	12	20		10	$30,000	11.04
3	Gukesh Dommaraju (IND)	14	5½	19½		8	$25,000	9.66
T-4	Jan-Krzysztof Duda (POL)	11	8	19		6.5	$17,500	
T-4	Alireza Firouzja (FRA)	8	11	19		6.5	$17,500	
6	Nodirbek Abdusattorov (UZB)	6	12	18		5	$11,000	
T-7	Anish Giri (NED)	8	9	17		WC (3.5)	$9,500	
T-7	Fabiano Caruana (USA)	9	8	17		3.5	$9,500	
9	R Praggnanandhaa (IND)	9	6	15		2	$8,000	
10	Ivan Šarić (CRO)	7	6	13		WC (1)	$7,000	

2025 GCT SuperUnited Rapid & Blitz Croatia – Rapid, July 2–4 Zagreb, Croatia
	Player	Rating	1	2	3	4	5	6	7	8	9	10	Points
1	Gukesh Dommaraju (IND)	2654		0	2	2	2	1	2	2	1	2	14
2	Jan-Krzysztof Duda (POL)	2718	2		1	1	1	2	1	1	1	1	11
3	Magnus Carlsen (NOR)	2819	0	1		1	2	1	1	2	1	1	10
4	R Praggnanandhaa (IND)	2688	0	1	1		1	1	1	1	2	1	9
5	Fabiano Caruana (USA)	2756	0	1	0	1		2	1	0	2	2	9
6	Anish Giri (NED)	2688	1	0	1	1	0		2	0	1	2	8
7	Alireza Firouzja (FRA)	2753	0	1	1	1	1	0		2	1	1	8
8	Wesley So (USA)	2714	0	1	0	1	2	2	0		1	1	8
9	Ivan Šarić (CRO)	2597	1	1	1	1	1	0	0	1		1	7
10	Nodirbek Abdusattorov (UZB)	2732	0	1	1	1	1	0	0	1	1		6

2025 GCT SuperUnited Rapid & Blitz Croatia – Blitz, July 5–6 Zagreb, Croatia
	Player	Rating	1	2	3	4	5	6	7	8	9	10	Points
1	Magnus Carlsen (NOR)	2883		½ ½	1 0	1 1	½ ½	½ ½	1 ½	1 ½	1 1	1 ½	12½
2	Wesley So (USA)	2786	½ ½		1 ½	1 ½	1 ½	½ 0	1 1	0 ½	½ 1	1 1	12
3	Nodirbek Abdusattorov (UZB)	2723	0 1	0 ½		1 0	½ 1	1 ½	0 1	½ 1	1 1	1 1	12
4	Alireza Firouzja (FRA)	2814	0 0	0 ½	0 1		1 1	1 1	½ ½	½ 1	1 0	1 1	11
5	Anish Giri (NED)	2690	½ ½	0 ½	½ 0	0 0		½ 1	0 1	½ 1	½ 1	½ 1	9
6	Jan-Krzysztof Duda (POL)	2770	½ ½	½ 1	0 ½	0 0	½ 0		1 0	1 1	½ 0	1 0	8
7	Fabiano Caruana (USA)	2782	0 ½	0 0	1 0	½ ½	1 0	0 1		½ 1	1 1	0 0	8
8	R Praggnanandhaa (IND)	2734	0 ½	1 ½	½ 0	½ 0	½ 0	0 0	½ 0		½ 0	1 ½	6
9	Ivan Šarić (CRO)	2593	0 0	½ 0	0 0	0 1	½ 0	½ 1	0 0	½ 1		1 0	6
10	Gukesh Dommaraju (IND)	2615	0 ½	0 0	0 0	0 0	½ 0	0 1	1 1	0 ½	0 1		5½

=== Saint Louis Rapid & Blitz ===
The fourth leg of the Grand Chess Tour was held in St. Louis, United States from August 11–15. Unlike the other tournaments, this event did not count for the 2025 FIDE Circuit as more than 50% of the players represented the USA.

2025 GCT Saint Louis Rapid & Blitz, August 11–15 St. Louis, Missouri, United States
	Player	Rapid	Blitz	Total	TB	Tour Points	Prize money
1	Levon Aronian (USA)	13	11½	24½		13	$40,000
2	Fabiano Caruana (USA)	14	7½	21½		10	$30,000
3	Maxime Vachier-Lagrave (FRA)	11	10	21		8	$25,000
4	Nodirbek Abdusattorov (UZB)	9	11½	20½		7	$20,000
5	Wesley So (USA)	9	10	19		6	$15,000
T-6	Lê Quang Liêm (VIE)	7	11	18		WC (4.5)	$10,500
T-6	Gukesh Dommaraju (IND)	10	8	18		4.5	$10,500
8	Leinier Dominguez (USA)	9	6½	15½		WC (3)	$9,000
9	Grigoriy Oparin (USA)	3	10	13		WC (2)	$8,000
10	Sam Shankland (USA)	5	4	9		WC (1)	$7,000

2025 GCT Saint Louis Rapid & Blitz – Rapid, August 11–13 St. Louis, Missouri, United States
	Player	Rating	1	2	3	4	5	6	7	8	9	10	Points
1	Fabiano Caruana (USA)	2750		2	1	0	2	1	2	2	2	2	14
2	Levon Aronian (USA)	2732	0		2	2	1	1	2	1	2	2	13
3	Maxime Vachier-Lagrave (FRA)	2725	1	0		1	1	2	1	1	2	2	11
4	Gukesh Dommaraju (IND)	2687	2	0	1		0	2	1	2	0	2	10
T-5	Leinier Dominguez (USA)	2705	0	1	1	2		1	0	1	2	1	9
T-5	Wesley So (USA)	2704	1	1	0	0	1		1	1	2	2	9
T-5	Nodirbek Abdusattorov (UZB)	2721	0	0	1	1	2	1		1	1	2	9
8	Lê Quang Liêm (VIE)	2655	0	1	1	0	1	1	1		2	0	7
9	Sam Shankland (USA)	2621	0	0	0	2	0	0	1	0		2	5
10	Grigoriy Oparin (USA)	2634	0	0	0	0	1	0	0	2	0		3

2025 GCT Saint Louis Rapid & Blitz – Blitz, August 14–15 St. Louis, Missouri, United States
	Player	Rating	1	2	3	4	5	6	7	8	9	10	Points
T-1	Levon Aronian (USA)	2768		0 ½	½ ½	½ ½	½ ½	1 0	½ ½	1 1	1 1	1 1	11½
T-1	Nodirbek Abdusattorov (UZB)	2757	1 ½		½ ½	0 1	0 ½	½ 1	1 0	1 1	1 ½	1 ½	11½
3	Lê Quang Liêm (VIE)	2675	½ ½	½ ½		½ 1	0 0	½ 1	1 ½	1 ½	1 0	1 1	11
T-4	Grigoriy Oparin (USA)	2651	0 1	1 0	½ 0		1 1	½ ½	½ ½	½ 0	1 0	1 1	10
T-4	Wesley So (USA)	2803	½ ½	1 ½	1 1	0 0		½ ½	1 0	½ 0	½ 1	1 ½	10
T-4	Maxime Vachier-Lagrave (FRA)	2769	½ ½	½ 0	½ 0	½ ½	½ ½		1 ½	½ 1	1 ½	½ 1	10
7	Gukesh Dommaraju (IND)	2613	½ ½	0 1	0 ½	½ ½	0 1	0 ½		½ 0	1 0	½ 1	8
8	Fabiano Caruana (USA)	2760	0 0	0 0	0 ½	½ 1	½ 1	½ 0	½ 1		½ ½	½ ½	7½
9	Leinier Dominguez (USA)	2634	0 0	0 ½	0 1	0 1	½ 0	0 ½	0 1	½ ½		0 1	6½
10	Sam Shankland (USA)	2651	0 0	0 ½	0 0	0 0	0 ½	½ 0	½ 0	½ ½	1 0		4

=== Sinquefield Cup ===
The fifth leg of the Grand Chess Tour was held in St. Louis, United States from August 18–28. Wesley So won the tournament in playoffs, while Vachier-Lagrave, Caruana, Praggnanandhaa & Aronian qualified for the GCT finals in Brazil.

2025 GCT Sinquefield Cup, August 18–28 St. Louis, Missouri, United States, Category XXI (2750.2)
	Player	Rating	1	2	3	4	5	6	7	8	9	10	Points	TB	Tour Points	Prize money	Circuit
1	Wesley So (United States)	2745		½	½	½	½	½	½	1	½	1	5½	1½	10	$77,666	23.99
2	R Praggnanandhaa (India)	2779	½		½	½	½	½	½	1	1	½	5½	1	10	$67,666	20.72
3	Fabiano Caruana (United States)	2784	½	½		½	½	½	½	½	1	1	5½	½	10	$67,666	20.72
4	Levon Aronian (United States)	2737	½	½	½		½	½	½	½	½	1	5		7	$32,000	
5	Samuel Sevian (United States)	2683	½	½	½	½		½	½	½	½	½	4½		WC (5)	$21,833	
6	Jan-Krzysztof Duda (Poland)	2725	½	½	½	½	½		½	½	0	1	4½		5	$21,833	
7	Maxime Vachier-Lagrave (France)	2736	½	½	½	½	½	½		½	½	½	4½		5	$21,833	
8	Gukesh Dommaraju (India)	2776	0	0	½	½	½	½	½		½	1	4		3	$16,000	
9	Alireza Firouzja (France)	2766	½	0	0	½	½	1	½	½		0	3½		2	$13,000	
10	Nodirbek Abdusattorov (Uzbekistan)	2771	0	½	0	0	½	0	½	0	1		2½		1	$10,000	

First place play-off
	Player	Blitz rating	1	2	3	Score
1	Wesley So (USA)	2803		1	½	1½
2	R Praggnanandhaa (IND)	2705	0		1	1
3	Fabiano Caruana (USA)	2760	½	0		½

=== Grand Finals ===
In 2025, the GCT Finals were held in São Paulo, Brazil from September 26–October 4. It was the first GCT Finals since the 2019 tour.

Each match consisted of the following games:

- 2 classical games (worth 6 points for a win and 3 points for a draw)
- 2 rapid games (worth 4 points for a win and 2 points for a draw)
- 4 blitz games (worth 2 points for a win and 1 point for a draw)

If a match was tied 14-all after these games, two additional shorter rapid games were played, followed by an armageddon game if necessary.

Semifinals
1	Maxime Vachier-Lagrave (France)	6	6	5	17
4	R Praggnanandhaa (India)	6	2	3	11
2	Fabiano Caruana (United States)	6	4	5	15
3	Levon Aronian (United States)	6	4	3	13

Finals
1	Maxime Vachier-Lagrave (France)	6	6	1	13
2	Fabiano Caruana (United States)	6	2	7	15
Third place
4	R Praggnanandhaa (India)	6	0	2	8
3	Levon Aronian (United States)	6	8	6	20
