= Diego Valerga =

Argentine chess grandmaster (born 1971)

Personal information
- Born: October 1, 1971 (age 54) Buenos Aires, Argentina

Chess career
- Country: Argentina
- Title: Grandmaster (2009)
- FIDE rating: 2447 (July 2026)
- Peak rating: 2523 (January 2009)

Diego Valerga is an Argentine chess grandmaster.

== Chess career ==
He played for Argentina in the 2006 and 2010 Chess Olympiads. In 2010, he was defeated by Ugandan player Steven Kawuma in an upset.

He was the captain of the Argentine team in the 42nd Chess Olympiad. He was one of many team captains who signed a petition protesting FIDE's anti-cheating regulation regarding notifying arbiters when players need to go to the lavatory.

In April 2023, he won the 52nd Mar del Plata International Open.

== Personal life ==
Off the chessboard, he is a pediatrician.
