= Petr Neuman =

Czech chess grandmaster (1978–2025)

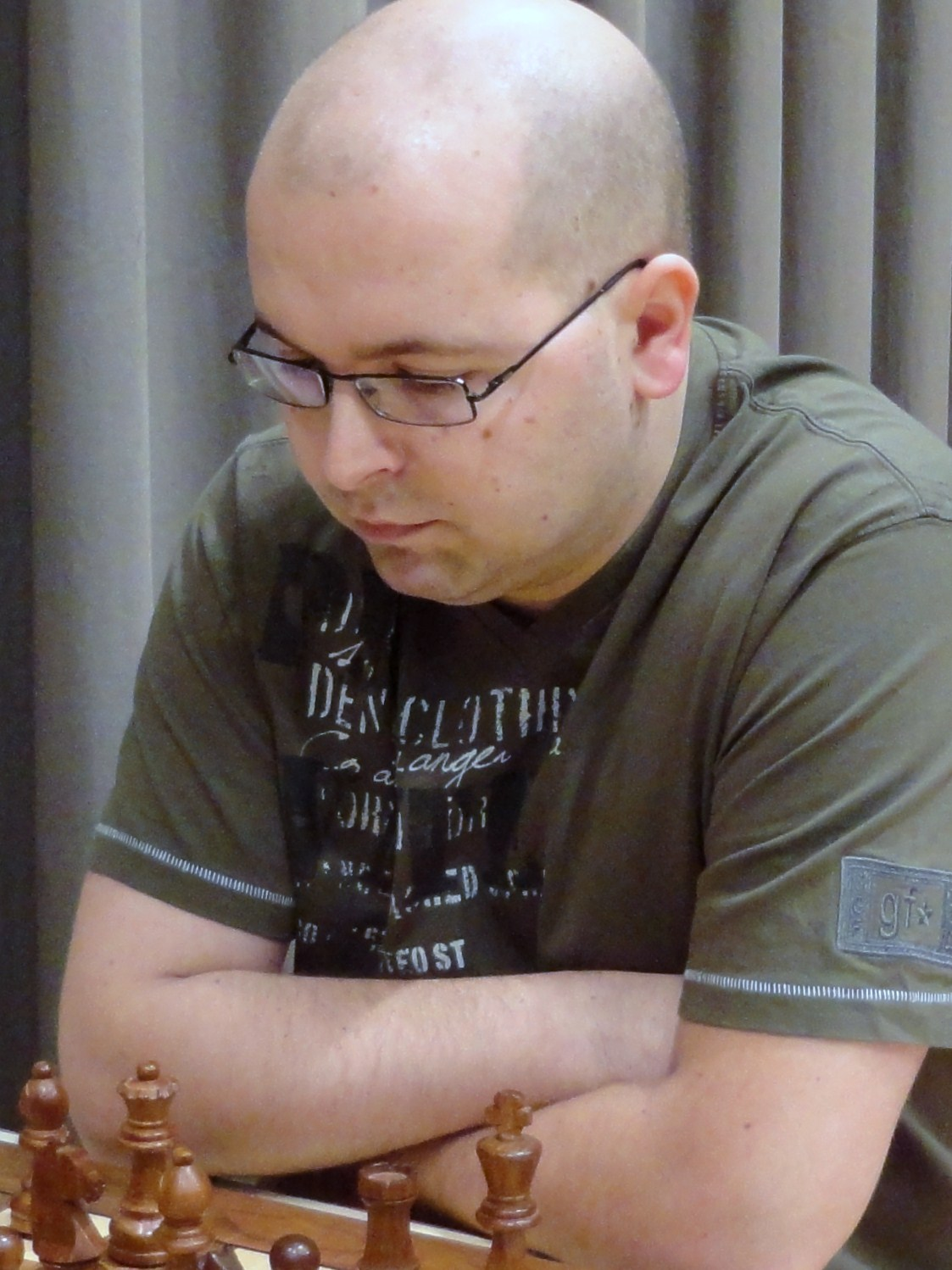
- Neuman in 2012

Personal information
- Born: 11 March 1978 Rakovník, Czechoslovakia
- Died: 27 April 2025 (aged 47) Prague, Czech Republic

Chess career
- Country: Czech Republic
- Title: Grandmaster (2013)
- Peak rating: 2522 (June 2013)

Petr Neuman (11 March 1978 – 27 April 2025) was a Czech chess grandmaster.

== Career ==
In April 2013, he was one of 13 players who tied for first place in the Neckar Open, ultimately being ranked in 10th after tiebreaks.

In July 2017, he had the strongest individual performance in the Czech Team Open championship, scoring 6.5/7.

In March 2025, he finished in second place at the Pilsen Open E Blitz Rating Open, scoring 9/11.

== Life ==
Outside of chess, he was a secondary school teacher of mathematics and geography.

Neuman was found dead in his Prague apartment on 28 April 2025. He had just finished playing for the Bad Mergentheim team in the season's German Bundesliga.
