= Aswath S =

Indian chess grandmaster (born 2008)

Personal information
- Born: 2008 (age 17–18) Kanyakumari, India

Chess career
- Country: India
- Title: Grandmaster (2026)
- FIDE rating: 2540 (October 2026)
- Peak rating: 2546 (August 2026)

Aswath Siva is an Indian chess grandmaster. He is the 98th Grandmaster from India.

== Chess career ==
In December 2022, he won the MPL 47th National Sub-Junior Under-15 Open with an unbeaten score of 9.5/11.

In September 2023, he won the silver medal in the Asian Junior Open Championship, automatically earning him the IM title.

In April 2025, he won the Grenke Open (which was one of the tournaments of the 2025 FIDE Circuit) with a score of 8/9 and a performance rating of 2779, ahead of grandmaster Brandon Jacobson on tiebreaks. He also achieved his first GM Norm and crossed the 2500 rating mark.

In May 2025, he won the Noisiel Open A with an unbeaten 7.5/9, a full point ahead of the rest of the field, including grandmaster Sergey Fedorchuk.

In December 2025, he won the First Saturday GM Round Robin Budapest with 7/9 and earned his second GM Norm.

In July 2026, Aswath earned his third and final GM Norm at the Pune International Grandmaster Round Robin Tournament, becoming India's 98th Grandmaster. He secured the title by defeating FM Kannan Vaidyanathan with black pieces in the final round, finishing second in the tournament with 7/9 (+6−1=2).
