= R Praggnanandhaa =

Indian chess grandmaster (born 2005)

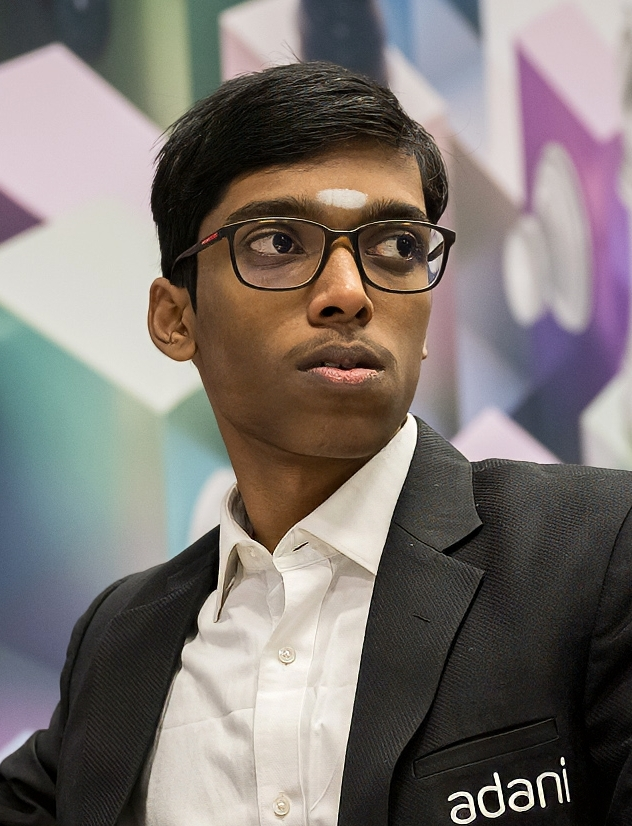
- Praggnanandhaa in 2025

Personal information
- Born: Praggnanandhaa Rameshbabu; 10 August 2005 (age 21) Chennai, Tamil Nadu, India

Chess career
- Country: India
- Title: Grandmaster (2018)
- FIDE rating: 2763 (November 2026)
- Peak rating: 2785 (September 2025)
- Ranking: No. 7 (November 2026)
- Peak ranking: No. 4 (July 2025)

Rameshbabu Praggnanandhaa (born 10 August 2005), commonly known as Pragg, is an Indian chess grandmaster. A former chess prodigy, he placed second in the 2023 Chess World Cup, and won the 2025 FIDE Circuit. He was part of the Indian open team that won the gold medal at the 45th Chess Olympiad, silver medal at the 46th Chess Olympiad, bronze medal at the 44th Chess Olympiad and silver medal in the men's team competition of the 2022 Asian Games.

Praggnanandhaa won the Grand Chess Tour 2026, Tata Steel Chess Tournament 2025, Norway Chess 2026, UzChess Cup 2025 and participated in the Candidates Tournament in 2024 and 2026.

== Early and personal life ==
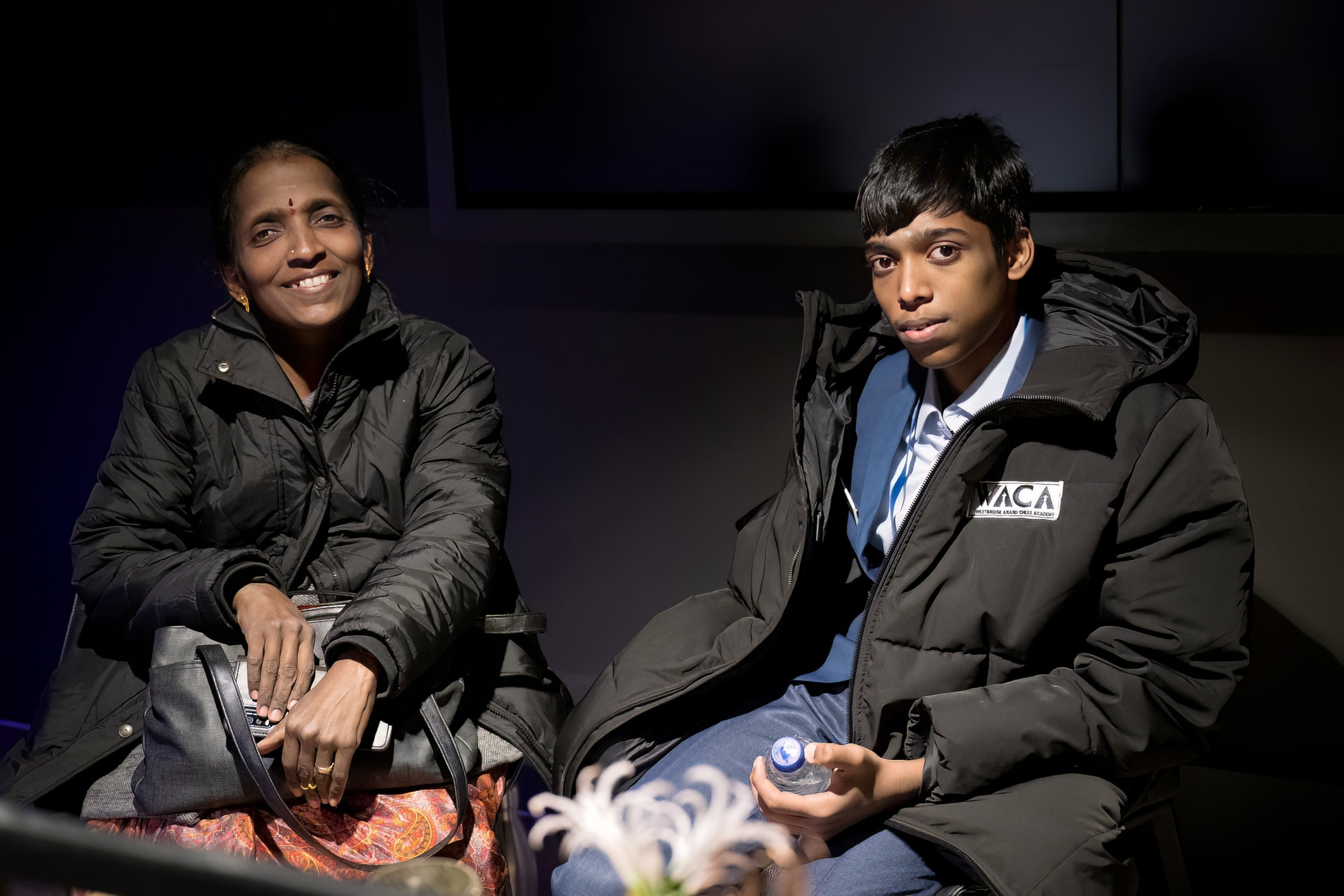
Praggnanandhaa pictured with his mother, Nagalakshmi (left).

Praggnanandhaa was born to a Tamil-speaking family in Chennai, Tamil Nadu, on 10 August 2005. His father, Rameshbabu, works as a branch manager at TNSC Bank, and his mother, Nagalakshmi, is a homemaker who often accompanies Praggnanandhaa when he travels for tournaments.

Praggnanandhaa and his older sister Vaishali are the first brother and sister to earn grandmaster titles, with Praggnanandhaa doing so in 2018 and his sister doing so in 2023. They are also the first brother and sister to qualify for the Candidates Tournament.

Aside from chess, Praggnanandhaa enjoys playing table tennis and watching cricket in his spare time.

== Career ==
=== 2013–2019 ===
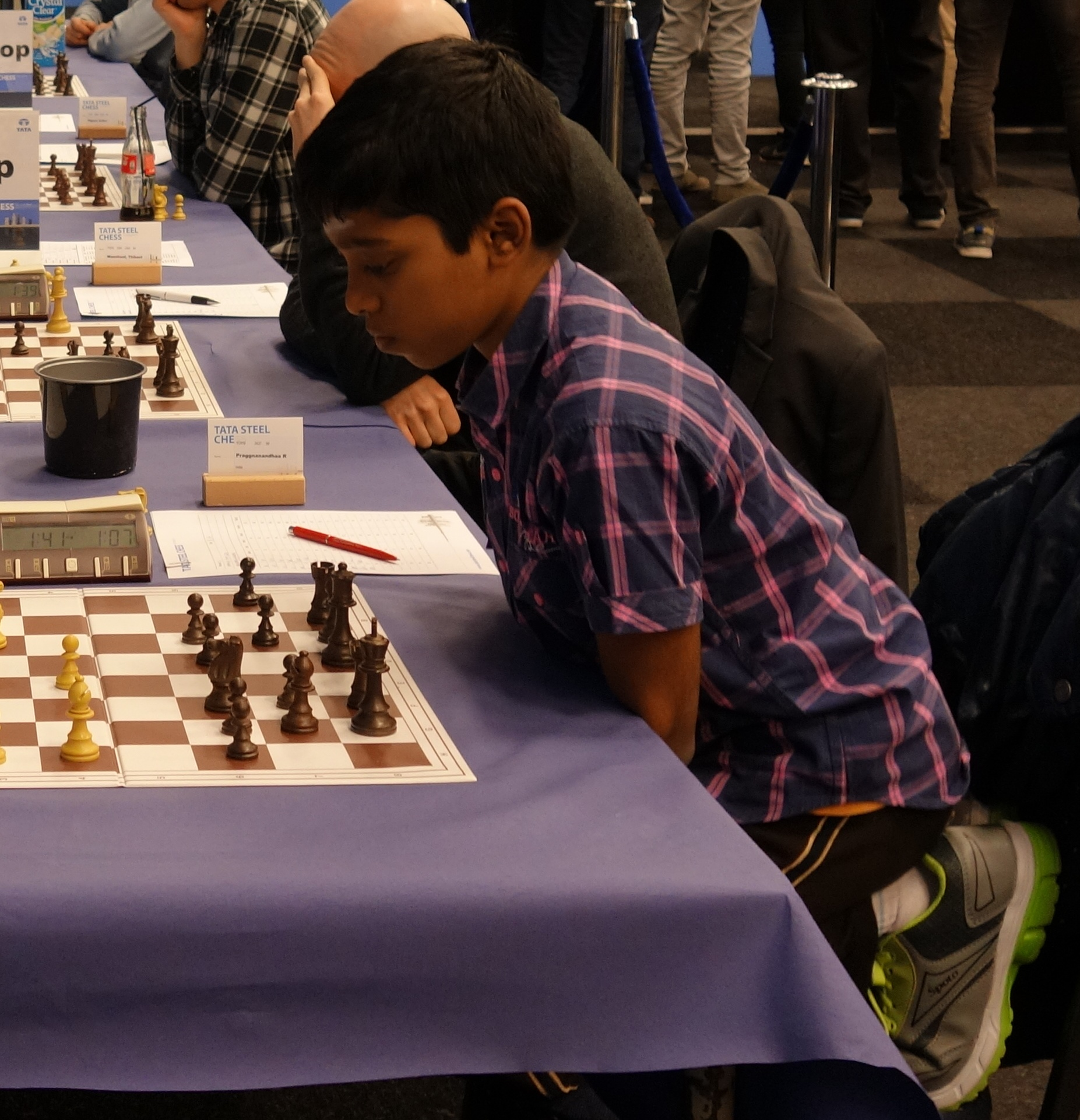
Pragg (11) at Tata Steel Chess 2017 - amateur tournament

Praggnanandhaa won the World Youth Chess Championship Under-8 title in 2013, earning him the title of FIDE Master. He won the under-10 title in 2015. In 2016, Praggnanandhaa became the youngest international master in history, at the age of 10 years, 10 months, and 19 days. He achieved his first grandmaster norm at the World Junior Chess Championship in November 2017, finishing fourth with 8 points.

He gained his second norm at the Heraklion Fischer Memorial GM norm tournament in Greece on 17 April 2018. On 23 June 2018 he achieved his third and final norm at the Gredine Open in Urtijëi, Italy, by defeating Luca Moroni in the eighth round to become, at the age of 12 years, 10 months and 13 days, the then second-youngest person ever to achieve the rank of grandmaster (Sergey Karjakin attained the title at 12 years and 7 months). He is the seventh-youngest person ever to achieve the title of Grandmaster (GM), behind Abhimanyu Mishra, Faustino Oro, Karjakin, Gukesh Dommaraju, Yağız Kaan Erdoğmuş, and Javokhir Sindarov.

In 2018, Praggnanandhaa was invited to the Magistral de León Masters in Spain for a four-game rapid match against Wesley So. He defeated So in game one, and after three games the score was tied at 1½–1½. In the last game, So defeated Praggnanandhaa, winning the match 2½–1½. In January 2018, Praggnanandhaa tied for third place with GM Alder Escobar Forero and IM Denys Shmelov in the Charlotte Chess Center's Winter 2018 GM Norm Invitational held in Charlotte, North Carolina, with a score of 5/9.

In July 2019, Praggnanandhaa won the Xtracon Chess Open in Denmark, scoring 8½/10 points (+7–0=3). On 12 October 2019, he won the World Youth Championships in the Under-18 section with a score of 9/11. In December 2019, he became the second-youngest person to achieve a rating of 2600. He did this at the age of 14 years, 3 months and 24 days.

=== 2021 ===
In April 2021, Praggnanandhaa won the Polgar Challenge, the first leg (out of four) of the Julius Baer Challengers Chess Tour, a rapid online event organized by Julius Baer Group and Chess24.com for young talents. He scored 15½/19, 1½ points ahead of the next best placed competitors. This win helped him qualify for the next Meltwater Champions Chess Tour on 24 April 2021, where he finished in 10th place with a score of 7/15 (+4-5=6), including wins against Teimour Radjabov, Jan-Krzysztof Duda, Sergey Karjakin, and Johan-Sebastian Christiansen as well as a draw against World Champion Magnus Carlsen.

Praggnanandhaa entered the Chess World Cup 2021 as the 90th seed. He defeated GM Gabriel Sargissian 2–0 in round 2, and advanced to round 4 after defeating GM Michał Krasenkow in the rapid tiebreaks in round 3. He was eliminated in round four by Maxime Vachier-Lagrave.

=== 2022 ===
In January, Praggnanandhaa played in the Masters section of the Tata Steel Chess Tournament 2022, winning games against Andrey Esipenko, Vidit Gujrathi and Nils Grandelius, finishing in 12th place with a final score of 5½. On 20 February 2022, he became the third Indian player (after Anand and Harikrishna) to win a game against World Champion Magnus Carlsen in any time format, in the online Airthings Masters rapid tournament of the Champions Chess Tour 2022, with a 15+10 time control. In August, he played as board three for the India-2 team in the 44th Chess Olympiad in Chennai, which went on to finish third and win the bronze medal. His score of 6½/9 (+5−1=3) with a performance rating of 2767 resulted in him winning an individual bronze medal.

At the Chessable Masters online rapid chess tournament in May 2022, he defeated Carlsen once again, his second win over him in three months, and advanced to the finals. He also defeated Carlsen three times in the FTX Crypto Cup 2022, finishing second behind Carlsen in the final standings. Praggnanandhaa won the Asian Continental Chess Championship 2022, scoring 7/9 (+5−0=4).

=== 2023 ===
In January 2023, Praggnanandhaa played in the Tata Steel Chess Masters 2023. He defeated a 2800-rated grandmaster, Ding Liren, for the first time in a classical game. He ended the tournament in 9th place with a score of 6/13.

In the World Cup 2023, Praggnanandhaa became the world's youngest player ever to reach the World Cup final, defeating Fabiano Caruana in tie-breaks in the semi-final. He also became the second Indian after Viswanathan Anand to reach the final in Chess World Cup history. His play against former classical World Chess Champion Magnus Carlsen in the final resulted in a defeat in the rapid tie-breaks, securing him second place and qualification for the 2024 Candidates Tournament. He was seconded during that tournament by Russian grandmaster Peter Svidler.

=== 2024 ===
In April, in the 2024 Candidates Tournament, held in Toronto, Praggnanandhaa placed 5th out of 8 participants, scoring 7/14. In May, in the third round of Norway Chess 2024, he defeated Magnus Carlsen with the white pieces for the first time in a classical over-the-board match, taking the sole lead in the standings with 5½ points. He went on to defeat Fabiano Caruana in round five to enter the world's top 10 rankings, and eventually finished the tournament in third place with 14½ points, after beating Hikaru Nakamura in an Armageddon tiebreak in the final round.

In September, Praggnanandhaa played as board two for the gold medal-winning Indian team at the 45th Chess Olympiad in Budapest. He finished with a score of 6/10 (+3−1=6) and a rating performance of 2713.

=== 2025 ===
Praggnanandhaa won the Tata Steel Chess Tournament 2025 Masters section, held from 17 January to 2 February in Wijk aan Zee, scoring 8½/13, before defeating Gukesh D in the playoff. He finished fourth in the Prague Chess Festival 2025, and third in the GCT Superbet Rapid & Blitz Poland. In May, he won the GCT Superbet Romania in Bucharest, scoring 5½/9, before winning a playoff against Maxime Vachier-Lagrave and Alireza Firouzja.

In June, he scored 6½/9 and finished 2nd in the Stepan Avagyan Memorial. In the same month, Praggnanandhaa won the UzChess Cup 2025 in Tashkent, scoring 5½/9, before winning the blitz tiebreaks against Javokhir Sindarov and Nodirbek Abdusattorov and signed for Dutch esports club Team Liquid. After this win, he climbed to world number four on the July 2025 FIDE rankings list, and subsequently became the number one rated player in India.

Praggnanandhaa finished fourth on the tour rankings of Grand Chess Tour 2025, with third in Rapid & Blitz Poland, tied first (1st following blitz tie-breaks) in Superbet Chess Classic Romania (+2−0=7), 9th in Rapid & Blitz Croatia, tied first (2−3rd after blitz tie-breaks) in Sinquefield Cup, as in the top 4, he qualified for the finals in São Paulo, he lost in the semifinals to Maxime Vachier-Lagrave and in the 3rd place match to Levon Aronian.

In November 2025, Pragg played in the Chess World Cup 2025 he received bye in the first round and defeated Temur Kuybokarov 5–3 and Robert Hovhannisyan 1½–½ in the second and third rounds, and lost to Daniil Dubov 1½–2½ in the fourth round. In December, Praggnanandhaa became co-champion of the London Chess Classic 2025 Open, sharing first place with Velimir Ivic and Ameet Ghasi after all three finished on 7/9, with no tiebreak system in place to separate them. By the end of 2025, he won the 2025 FIDE Circuit, qualifying for the Candidates Tournament 2026.

=== 2026 ===
In March–April 2026, Praggnanandhaa participated in the Candidates Tournament 2026 in Cyprus. Having qualified as the winner of the FIDE Circuit 2025, he finished 7th with a score of 6/14.

In the Norway Chess 2026, held from 25 May to 5 June in Oslo, Praggnanandhaa won the open section with a total of 18 points, becoming the first Indian to win the Norway Chess tournament. After consecutive classical losses in rounds 5 and 6, he recovered by winning his final four games in rounds 7 to 10. A key highlight of his victory was defeating world number one Magnus Carlsen in both of their classical games—one with White and one with Black (rounds 3 and 8 respectively)—making him the first player to beat Carlsen twice in classical chess within the same tournament since Veselin Topalov did so in 2008.

In June, he participated in the World Rapid and Blitz Team Chess Championships 2026, as part of the Chess Gurukul Team. In the Rapid section, he won the individual gold medal for board 1, though his team could only finish 5th. In the Blitz section they were eliminated in the quarterfinals.

Praggnanandhaa participated in the Grand Chess Tour 2026. In May, he finished tied 5-9th at Chess Classic Romania scoring 4½/9 (+1−1=0), his win against Javokhir Sindarov ended the latter's 53-game unbeaten streak. In July, he participated in the Super Rapid & Blitz Croatia, where he tied with Alireza Firouzja for first place in the rapid section, with both players scoring 12 points. He later secured fifth place in the blitz segment with 9½ points, culminating in an aggregate score of 21½ points and a joint third-place finish in the overall standings alongside Maxime Vachier-Lagrave.

In August, Praggnanandhaa won the Saint Louis Rapid & Blitz, he topped the rapid section with 12/18 points and carried his lead into the blitz, finishing with a combined total of 23½ points 1½ points ahead of the field. His rapid performance moved him into the top 10 of the world rapid rankings for the first time. At the Sinquefield Cup Praggnanandhaa tied for first with Wesley So on 5½/9, but lost the title in a playoff after both rapid tiebreak games were drawn and So won the deciding Armageddon game. With this result, he finished first on the tour rankings of the Grand Chess Tour, qualifying for the GCT Finals.

In the Grand Chess Tour Finals at St. Louis, Praggnanandhaa won his semi-final match against Vincent Keymer by a score of 19–9, with one win in the classical portion, and advanced to the final against Fabiano Caruana, after losing one of their classical games he made a comeback in the Rapid section to win the match 15–13, claiming his maiden Grand Chess Tour title. He earned $200,000 and automatic qualification to the Grand Chess Tour 2027.

In September, Praggnanandhaa played as board one for the silver medal-winning Indian team at the 46th Chess Olympiad in Samarkand. His score of 6½/10 (+3−0=7) with a performance rating of 2772 resulted in him winning an individual bronze medal.

In October, Praggnanandhaa finished 2nd at the rapid tournament Clutch Chess: Champions Showdown, ahead of Fabiano Caruana and Hikaru Nakamura and following Javokhir Sindarov. In November, Praggnanandhaa finished 21st of 24 players at the pilot event of Total Chess World Championship losing 12 classical rating points.

== Awards and recognition ==
=== National ===
- Arjuna Award: 2022 by The President of India.

=== Others ===
- CNN-News18 Indian of the Year (Sports): 2023
- Economic Times 40 under 40: 2026

== See also ==
- Chess in India
- List of Indian chess players
- List of chess grandmasters

Achievements
Preceded by Parimarjan Negi	Youngest ever Indian Grandmaster; 2018–2019	Succeeded by Gukesh D
Preceded by Lê Quang Liêm	Asian Chess Champion; 2022	Succeeded by Shamsiddin Vokhidov
