= 2025 United States Chess Championship =

2025 Chess tournament

US Chess Championships 2025
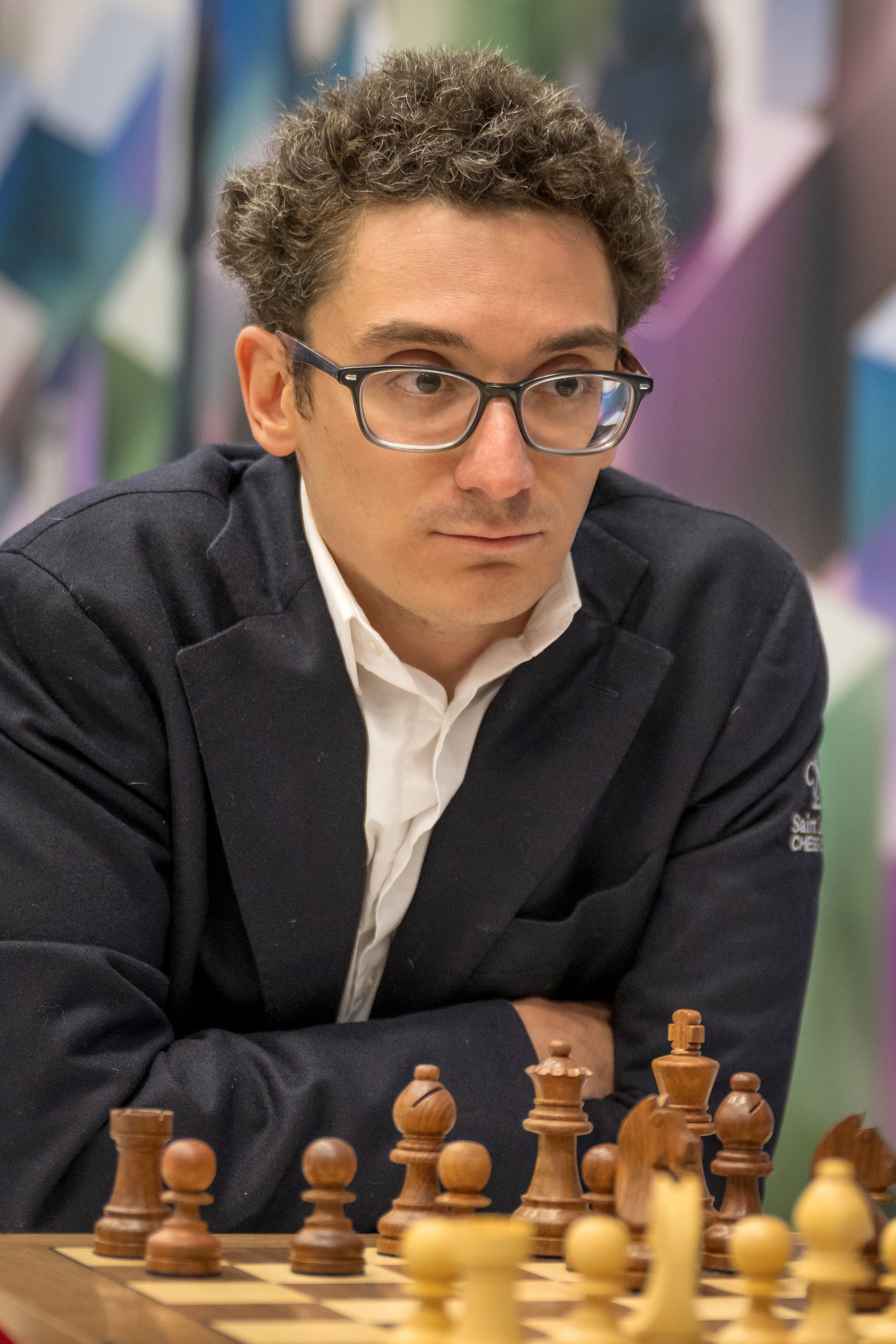
- Fabiano Caruana, the defending champion, secured his fourth consecutive title at the 2025 Championships
- Venue: Saint Louis Chess Club
- Location: St. Louis, Missouri
- Dates: October 11–25, 2025
- Competitors: 12
- Winning score: 8 points out of 11
- Total prize money: $250,000

Champion
- (United States) Fabiano Caruana

The 2025 edition of the United States Chess Championship took place at the Saint Louis Chess Club in St. Louis, Missouri from October 11 to October 25, 2025. As with every United States Chess Championship tournament since 2014, it was a round-robin tournament. Twelve players were invited to compete. Besides the reigning US champion, these included the winners of the US Open Chess Championship and the US Junior Championship. The remaining players were chosen by highest invitational rating, or were selected by the United States Chess Federation (USCF) as wildcards.

The twelve qualifiers were Fabiano Caruana, Wesley So, Hans Niemann, Levon Aronian, Awonder Liang, Samuel Sevian, Ray Robson, Grigoriy Oparin, Andy Woodward, Abhimanyu Mishra, Sam Shankland and Dariusz Świercz, all of whom are grandmasters.

Fabiano Caruana won the tournament, finishing half a point ahead of runner-up Wesley So.

== Participants ==
All statistics are as of October 2025 in FIDE ratings.

Participants
Player	Age	Rating	World ranking	Qualification method
(United States) Fabiano Caruana	33	2789	3	2024 Champion
(United States) Wesley So	31	2756	8	Rating
(United States) Hans Niemann	22	2738	15	Rating
(United States) Levon Aronian	42	2722	23	Rating
(United States) Awonder Liang	22	2710	30	Rating
(United States) Samuel Sevian	24	2698	33	Rating
(United States) Ray Robson	30	2664	52	Rating
(United States) Grigoriy Oparin	28	2661	58	Rating
(United States) Sam Shankland	34	2654	63	Rating
(United States) Abhimanyu Mishra	16	2651	68	Wildcard
(United States) Andy Woodward	15	2590	187	2025 US Junior Champion
(United States) Dariusz Świercz	31	2577	229	2025 US Open Champion

== Organization ==
The tournament was a twelve-player, round-robin tournament, meaning there were 11 rounds with each player facing the others once. The tournament winner will become the United States Chess Champion.

=== Regulations ===
- The time control is 90 minutes for the first 40 moves, followed by 30 minutes for the rest of the game. There is a 30-second increment starting on move one.
- Players are not allowed to draw by agreement.
- The event is a 12-player round-robin, where every player plays once against every other player on the field.
- Players get 1 point for a win, 0.5 points for a draw, and 0 points for a loss.
- The player with the most points at the end of the last round wins the event.

=== Tie breaks ===
While there was no tie for first place, such a situation would have been addressed as follows:

If two players tie for first a two-game 15+10 rapid match will take place. If there remains a tie, a single armageddon game will occur.

If three or four players tie for first a single round-robin in the 15+10 rapid time control will take place

If two players remain tied, they contest a two-game 5+2 blitz match. If the tie persists, an armageddon game decides the winner.

If three or more players remain tied, they contest a 5+2 round-robin.

If more than four players tie for first players will contest a 5+2 round-robin. If the round-robin ends in a tie, a series of armageddon games decide the winner.

=== Prize money ===
The event featured a $250,000 prize fund, distributed as follows:

Place	Cash prize (USD)
1st	$55,000 (+$7,000 winner bonus)
2nd	$43,000
3rd	$35,000
4th	$25,000
5th	$20,000
6th	$14,000
7th	$11,000
8th	$10,000
9th	$9,000
10th	$8,000
11th	$7,000
12th	$6,000

== Results ==
=== Standings ===
Fabiano Caruana won the tournament with a score of 8/11.

#	Player	Rating	1	2	3	4	5	6	7	8	9	10	11	12	Points
1	(United States) Fabiano Caruana	2789		½	½	½	1	½	1	½	½	1	1	1	8
2	(United States) Wesley So	2756	½		½	½	½	1	½	½	1	1	1	½	7.5
3	(United States) Levon Aronian	2722	½	½			½	1	½	½	½	1	½	½	6.5
4	(United States) Samuel Sevian	2698	½	½	½		1	0	1	½	½	½	½	½	6
5	(United States) Hans Niemann	2738	0	½	½	0		0	½	1	½	1	½	1	5.5
6	(United States) Andy Woodward	2590	½	0	0	1	1		0	½	½	½	1	½	5.5
7	(United States) Grigoriy Oparin	2661	0	½	½	0	½	1		½	½	½	½	½	5
8	(United States) Awonder Liang	2710	½	½	½	½	0	½	½		1	½	0	½	5
9	(United States) Ray Robson	2664	½	0	½	½	½	½	½	0		½	½	½	4.5
10	(United States) Sam Shankland	2654	0	0	0	½	0	½	½	½	½		1	1	4.5
11	(United States) Dariusz Świercz	2577	0	0	½	½	½	0	½	1	½	0		½	4
12	(United States) Abhimanyu Mishra	2652	0	½	½	½	0	½	½	½	½	0	½		4
