= Chess World Cup 2019 =

Chess tournament in Khanty-Mansiysk, Russia

FIDE Chess World Cup 2019
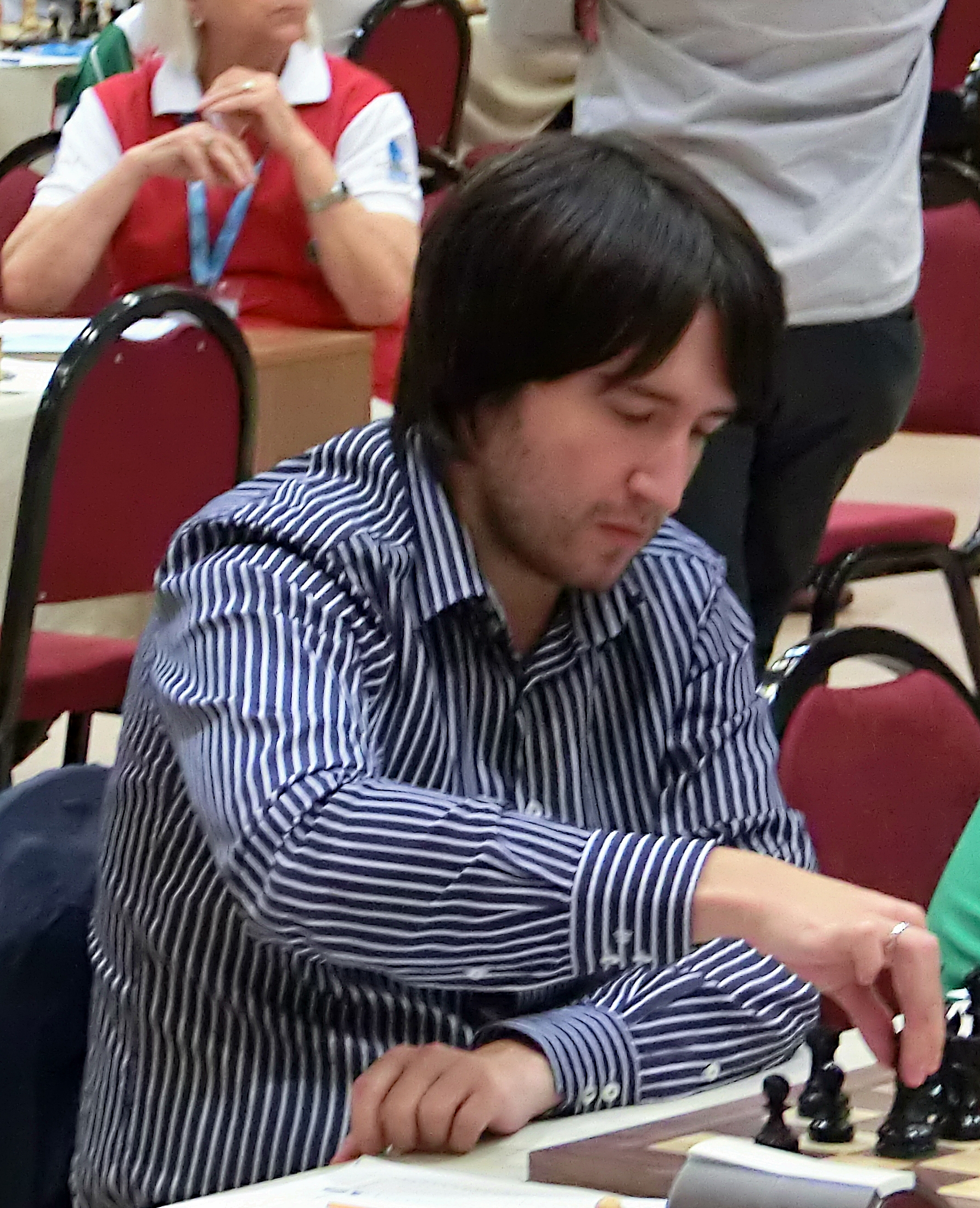
- Teimour Radjabov, the winner of the 2019 FIDE World Cup.

Tournament information
- Sport: Chess
- Location: Khanty-Mansiysk, Russia
- Dates: 9 September 2019–4 October 2019
- Administrator: FIDE
- Tournament format: Single-elimination tournament
- Host: Chess Federation of Russia

Final positions
- Champion: (Azerbaijan) Teimour Radjabov
- Runner-up: (China) Ding Liren
- 3rd place: (France) Maxime Vachier-Lagrave

The Chess World Cup 2019 was a 128-player single-elimination chess tournament that took place in Khanty-Mansiysk, Russia, from 9 September to 4 October 2019. It was won by Azerbaijani grandmaster Teimour Radjabov. He and the runner-up, Ding Liren, both qualified for the Candidates Tournament for the World Chess Championship 2021. It was the 8th edition of the Chess World Cup.

Levon Aronian, the winner of the Chess World Cup 2017, advanced to the quarterfinals before being eliminated by Maxime Vachier-Lagrave on tiebreaks. Vachier-Lagrave was eliminated by Radjabov in the semi-finals, but defeated Yu Yangyi to claim 3rd place.

== Bidding process ==
There was only one bid received for the combined FIDE World Cup and Olympiad events, which was done by the Yugra Chess Federation.

== Format ==
The tournament was a 7-round knockout event. The matches from round 1 to round 6 consisted of two classical games with a time control of 90 minutes per 40 moves plus 30 minutes for the rest of the game, with an increment of 30 seconds per move. The finals and the match for the third place consisted of four classical games.

If the score is tied after the classical games, rapid and, if necessary, blitz tiebreaks are played the next day. Two games are played with a time control of 25 minutes per game plus 10 seconds increment. In the case of a tie, they are followed by two games with a time control of 10 minutes per game plus 10 seconds increment. If the score is still tied, two blitz games follow (5 minutes plus 3 seconds increment). If the score is tied 4–4 after all these games, a single "Armageddon" game is played: the player who wins the drawing of lots may choose the colour; White has 5 minutes per game and Black has 4 minutes, with an increment of 2 seconds per move starting from move 61, and White needs a win to advance to the next round; Black advances if they win or the game is drawn.

The two top finishers qualified for the 2020 Candidates Tournament. The rules in fact specified that it would be the top two finishers other than Magnus Carlsen and Fabiano Caruana, because Carlsen as World Champion did not play in the Candidates, and Caruana had already qualified for the Candidates. The rule was introduced because the World Champion and the previous challenger unexpectedly signed up for the previous edition Chess World Cup 2017. This time, though, Carlsen and Caruana both declined their invitations to the World Cup, so the qualifiers are simply the two finalists.

== Schedule ==
Each of the first six rounds took three days: one day each for the two regular time limit games and then a third day for tiebreaks, if required. The final round has four days of regular time limit games and then a fifth day for tiebreaks, if required.

- Round 1: 10 September – 12 September
- Round 2: 13 September – 15 September
- Round 3: 16 September – 18 September
- Rest day: 19 September
- Round 4: 20 September – 22 September
- Round 5: 23 September – 25 September
- Round 6: 26 September – 28 September
- Rest day: 29 September
- Final and play-off for third place: 30 September – 4 October

== Prize money ==
The total prize fund was US$1,600,000, with the first prize of US$110,000.

Round	(US$) Prize received	(US$)Total
Round 1	64 × 6,000	384,000
Round 2	32 × 10,000	320,000
Round 3	16 × 16,000	256,000
Round 4	8 × 25,000	200,000
Round 5	4 × 35,000	140,000
4-th place	50,000	50,000
3-rd place	60,000	60,000
Runner-up	80,000	80,000
Winner	110,000	110,000
Total (US$)		1,600,000

== Participants ==
The participants were seeded by their FIDE rating of August 2019. All players are grandmasters unless indicated otherwise.

Number	Name	Country	Rating	Qualification path
1	Ding Liren	China	2805	WC
2	Anish Giri	Netherlands	2779	R
3	Maxime Vachier-Lagrave	France	2778	WC
4	Wesley So	United States	2776	WC
5	Ian Nepomniachtchi	Russia	2774	R
6	Levon Aronian	Armenia	2765	WC
7	Shakhriyar Mamedyarov	Azerbaijan	2764	R
8	Leinier Domínguez	United States	2763	Z2.1
9	Alexander Grischuk	Russia	2759	R
10	Teimour Radjabov	Azerbaijan	2758	R
11	Vladislav Artemiev	Russia	2757	E19
12	Yu Yangyi	China	2752	R
13	Sergey Karjakin	Russia	2750	R
14	Hikaru Nakamura	United States	2743	Z2.1
15	Dmitry Andreikin	Russia	2743	R
16	Radosław Wojtaszek	Poland	2739	E18
17	Pentala Harikrishna	India	2738	R
18	Jan-Krzysztof Duda	Poland	2730	R
19	Peter Svidler	Russia	2729	R
20	Nikita Vitiugov	Russia	2728	R
21	Wei Yi	China	2727	AS18
22	Lê Quang Liêm	Vietnam	2726	AS18
23	David Navara	Czech Republic	2724	E18
24	Bu Xiangzhi	China	2721	R
25	Wang Hao	China	2720	R
26	Sam Shankland	United States	2713	AM18
27	Maxim Matlakov	Russia	2710	E18
28	Evgeny Tomashevsky	Russia	2706	R
29	Vidit Gujrathi	India	2705	R
30	Dmitry Jakovenko	Russia	2704	R
31	Jeffery Xiong	United States	2703	Z2.1
32	Alireza Firouzja	Iran	2702	AS19
33	Daniil Dubov	Russia	2699	E19
34	Bassem Amin	Egypt	2692	AF
35	Gawain Jones	England	2692	E18
36	Nils Grandelius	Sweden	2691	E18
37	Michael Adams	England	2690	R
38	Boris Gelfand	Israel	2686	E19
39	Jorge Cori	Peru	2686	AM18
40	Maxim Rodshtein	Israel	2684	E19
41	Ernesto Inarkiev	Russia	2682	E18
42	Luke McShane	England	2682	E18
43	Anton Korobov	Ukraine	2679	E18
44	David Antón Guijarro	Spain	2678	E18
45	Arkadij Naiditsch	Azerbaijan	2675	R
46	Ruslan Ponomariov	Ukraine	2675	E19
47	Tamir Nabaty	Israel	2673	E18
48	Vladimir Fedoseev	Russia	2671	R
49	Kirill Alekseenko	Russia	2668	ON
50	Ferenc Berkes	Hungary	2666	E19
51	Liviu-Dieter Nisipeanu	Germany	2666	E19
52	Samuel Sevian	United States	2665	Z2.1
53	Baskaran Adhiban	India	2665	ACP
54	Ivan Cheparinov	Georgia	2663	E18
55	Sanan Sjugirov	Russia	2662	E18
56	Ivan Šarić	Croatia	2660	E18
57	Kacper Piorun	Poland	2660	E19
58	Rustam Kasimdzhanov	Uzbekistan	2657	Z3.4
59	Parham Maghsoodloo	Iran	2656	J18
60	Alexey Sarana	Russia	2655	E18
61	Anton Demchenko	Russia	2655	E18
62	Igor Kovalenko	Latvia	2654	PN
63	Benjamin Gledura	Hungary	2654	E19
64	Sergei Movsesian	Armenia	2654	E19
65	Grigoriy Oparin	Russia	2654	E19
66	Evgeniy Najer	Russia	2653	E18
67	Constantin Lupulescu	Romania	2652	E19
68	Robert Hovhannisyan	Armenia	2650	E18
69	Alexandr Predke	Russia	2650	E19
70	Maksim Chigaev	Russia	2643	ON
71	Evgeny Bareev	Canada	2643	Z2.2
72	Nijat Abasov	Azerbaijan	2640	E18
73	Benjamin Bok	Netherlands	2640	E18
74	Sandro Mareco	Argentina	2640	Z2.5
75	Ahmed Adly	Egypt	2636	Z4.2
76	Eduardo Iturrizaga Bonelli	Venezuela	2635	AM19
77	Aryan Tari	Norway	2634	J17
78	Mircea Pârligras	Romania	2633	E18
79	Rinat Jumabayev	Kazakhstan	2633	Z3.4
80	Nguyễn Ngọc Trường Sơn	Vietnam	2631	AS18
81	Surya Shekhar Ganguly	India	2630	AS18
82	S. P. Sethuraman	India	2630	AS19
83	Andrey Esipenko	Russia	2625	E19
84	Niclas Huschenbeth	Germany	2620	E19
85	S.L. Narayanan	India	2618	AS19
86	Abhijeet Gupta	India	2616	AS19
87	Neuris Delgado Ramirez	Paraguay	2612	AM19
88	Karthikeyan Murali	India	2612	AS19
89	Mateusz Bartel	Poland	2612	E19
90	Nihal Sarin	India	2610	PN
91	Lu Shanglei	China	2610	Z3.5
92	Aravindh Chithambaram	India	2607	Z3.7
93	Aleksandr Rakhmanov	Russia	2606	E19
94	Diego Flores	Argentina	2604	AM18
95	Amin Tabatabaei	Iran	2601	AS18
96	Emilio Cordova	Peru	2599	AM18
97	Arman Pashikian	Armenia	2599	E18
98	Igor Lysyj	Russia	2596	E19
99	Jose Eduardo Martinez Alcantara	Peru	2596	Z2.4
100	Alan Pichot	Argentina	2596	AM19
101	Nikita Petrov	Russia	2595	E19
102	Nodirbek Abdusattorov	Uzbekistan	2594	PN
103	Eltaj Safarli	Azerbaijan	2593	E18
104	Aleksei Pridorozhni	Russia	2591	ON
105	Xu Xiangyu	China	2584	Z3.5
106	Daniil Yuffa	Russia	2571	E18
107	Aleksej Aleksandrov	Belarus	2571	E19
108	Miguel Santos Ruiz	Spain	2567	E18
109	Frode Urkedal	Norway	2566	PN
110	Carlos Daniel Albornoz Cabrera	Cuba	2566	Z2.3
111	Cristobal Henriquez Villagra	Chile	2562	Z2.5
112	Yuri Gonzalez Vidal	Cuba	2554	AM19
113	Johan-Sebastian Christiansen	Norway	2554	E19
114	Krikor Mekhitarian	Brazil	2554	Z2.4
115	Bilel Bellahcene	Algeria	2550	Z4.1
116	Susanto Megaranto	Indonesia	2545	Z3.3
117	Ehsan Ghaem-Maghami	Iran	2539	Z3.1
118	Ilia Iljiushenok	Russia	2533	ON
119	Helgi Dam Ziska	Faroe Islands	2533	PN
120	Paulius Pultinevičius, IM	Lithuania	2485	E19
121	Alder Escobar Forero	Colombia	2477	Z2.3
122	Fy Antenaina Rakotomaharo, IM	Madagascar	2438	Z4.3
123	Essam El Gindy	Egypt	2423	AF
124	Sugar Gan-Erdene, no title	Mongolia	2408	Z3.3
125	Sergio Duran Vega, IM	Costa Rica	2395	AM19
126	Daniel Anwuli, IM	Nigeria	2284	Z4.4
127	Mohammad Fahad Rahman, FM	Bangladesh	2250	Z3.2
128	Shaun Press, FM	Papua New Guinea	1954	Z3.6

=== Qualification paths ===
- World Champion (1)
- WC: Semi-finalists of the Chess World Cup 2017 (4)
- WWC: Women's World Champion 2018 (1)
- J17 and J18: World Junior Champions 2017 and 2018 (2)
- E18 and E19: European Individual Championships 2018 (24) and 2019 (22)
- AM18 and AM19: American Continental Championships 2018 (4) and 2019 (4)
- AS18 and AS19: Asian Chess Championships 2018 (5) and 2019 (5)
- AF: African Chess Championship 2019 (2)
- Z2.1 (5), Z2.2 (1), Z2.3 (2), Z2.4 (2), Z2.5 (2), Z3.1 (1), Z3.2 (1), Z3.3 (2), Z3.4 (2), Z3.5 (2), Z3.6 (1), Z3.7 (1), Z4.1 (1), Z4.2 (1), Z4.3 (1), Z4.4 (1): Zonal tournaments
- R: Rating (average of all published ratings from August 2018 to July 2019 is used) (18)
- ACP: highest-placed participant of the ACP Tour who has not qualified with the previous criteria (1)
- PN: FIDE President nominee (5)
- ON: Organizer nominee (4)

=== Replacements ===
- Players from the list of qualifiers who declined to play:
  - Magnus Carlsen (NOR) (World champion)
  - Ju Wenjun (CHN) (WWC) (decided to instead participate in the FIDE Women's Grand Prix 2019–20)
  - Viswanathan Anand (IND) (who decided to instead focus on qualifying for the Candidates via the FIDE Grand Swiss Tournament 2019)
  - Vladimir Kramnik (RUS) (retired from top level chess in January 2019)
  - Richárd Rapport (HUN)
  - Veselin Topalov (BUL) (R)
- Their replacements, all from the ratings list, were:
  - Dmitry Andreikin (RUS)
  - Arkadij Naiditsch (AZE)
  - Vidit Gujrathi (IND)
  - Vladimir Fedoseev (RUS)
  - Evgeny Tomashevsky (RUS)
  - Michael Adams (ENG) (R)
- Other replacements:
  - Fabiano Caruana (USA) (Z2.1) → replaced by Alan Pichot (ARG) (AM19) (the next player in Z2.1 did not attain the required score of 50%, so the position passed on to the AM19)
  - Max Illingworth (AUS) (Z3.6) (retired) → replaced by Shaun Press (PNG) (Z3.6). This made Press the lowest rated player to play in a Chess World Cup.
  - Salem A. R. Saleh (UAE) (PN) → replaced by Nodirbek Abdusattorov (UZB) (PN)

== Results, rounds 1–4 ==
=== Section 1 ===
First round
1	(China) Ding Liren	2
128	(Papua New Guinea) Shaun Press	0
65	(Russia) Grigoriy Oparin	½
64	(Armenia) Sergei Movsesian	1½
33	(Russia) Daniil Dubov	1½
96	(Peru) Emilio Cordova	½
97	(Armenia) Arman Pashikian	½
32	(Iran) Alireza Firouzja	1½
17	(India) Pentala Harikrishna	2
112	(Cuba) Yuri Gonzalez Vidal	0
81	(India) Ganguly Surya Shekhar	2
48	(Russia) Vladimir Fedoseev	4
49	(Russia) Kirill Alekseenko	1½
80	(Vietnam) Nguyễn Ngọc Trường Sơn	½
113	(Norway) Johan-Sebastian Christiansen	2
16	(Poland) Radosław Wojtaszek	0

Quarter-finals
1	(China) Ding Liren	2½
64	(Armenia) Sergei Movsesian	1½
33	(Russia) Daniil Dubov	½
32	(Iran) Alireza Firouzja	1½
17	(India) Pentala Harikrishna	1½
48	(Russia) Vladimir Fedoseev	½
49	(Russia) Kirill Alekseenko	2½
113	(Norway) Johan-Sebastian Christiansen	1½

Third round
1	(China) Ding Liren	3
32	(Iran) Alireza Firouzja	1
17	(India) Pentala Harikrishna	0
49	(Russia) Kirill Alekseenko	2

Fourth round
1	(China) Ding Liren	3
49	(Russia) Kirill Alekseenko	1

=== Section 2 ===
First round
9	(Russia) Alexander Grischuk	2
120	(Lithuania) Paulius Pultinevičius	0
73	(Netherlands) Benjamin Bok	2½
56	(Croatia) Ivan Šarić	1½
41	(Russia) Ernesto Inarkiev	1½
88	(India) Karthikeyan Murali	½
105	(China) Xu Xiangyu	3½
24	(China) Bu Xiangzhi	2½
25	(China) Wang Hao	3½
104	(Russia) Aleksei Pridorozhni	2½
89	(Poland) Mateusz Bartel	½
40	(Israel) Maxim Rodshtein	1½
57	(Poland) Kacper Piorun	3½
72	(Azerbaijan) Nijat Abasov	4½
121	(Colombia) Alder Escobar Forero	0
8	(United States) Leinier Domínguez	2

Quarter-finals
9	(Russia) Alexander Grischuk	2½
73	(Netherlands) Benjamin Bok	1½
41	(Russia) Ernesto Inarkiev	½
105	(China) Xu Xiangyu	1½
25	(China) Wang Hao	1½
40	(Israel) Maxim Rodshtein	½
72	(Azerbaijan) Nijat Abasov	1
8	(United States) Leinier Domínguez	3

Third round
9	(Russia) Alexander Grischuk	2
105	(China) Xu Xiangyu	0
25	(China) Wang Hao	3½
8	(United States) Leinier Domínguez	4½

Fourth round
9	(Russia) Alexander Grischuk	2½
8	(United States) Leinier Domínguez	1½

=== Section 3 ===
First round
5	(Russia) Ian Nepomniachtchi	2
124	(Mongolia) Sugar Gan-Erdene	0
69	(Russia) Alexandr Predke	2½
60	(Russia) Alexey Sarana	1½
37	(England) Michael Adams	3½
92	(India) Aravindh Chithambaram	4½
101	(Russia) Nikita Petrov	1½
28	(Russia) Evgeny Tomashevsky	2½
21	(China) Wei Yi	1½
108	(Spain) Miguel Santos Ruiz	½
85	(India) S.L. Narayanan	1½
44	(Spain) David Antón Guijarro	2½
53	(India) Baskaran Adhiban	1½
76	(Venezuela) Eduardo Iturrizaga Bonelli	½
117	(Iran) Ehsan Ghaem-Maghami	2½
12	(China) Yu Yangyi	3½

Quarter-finals
5	(Russia) Ian Nepomniachtchi	1½
69	(Russia) Alexandr Predke	½
92	(India) Aravindh Chithambaram	½
28	(Russia) Evgeny Tomashevsky	1½
21	(China) Wei Yi	2½
44	(Spain) David Antón Guijarro	1½
53	(India) Baskaran Adhiban	1½
12	(China) Yu Yangyi	2½

Third round
5	(Russia) Ian Nepomniachtchi	5
28	(Russia) Evgeny Tomashevsky	3
21	(China) Wei Yi	1½
12	(China) Yu Yangyi	2½

Fourth round
5	(Russia) Ian Nepomniachtchi	½
12	(China) Yu Yangyi	1½

=== Section 4 ===
First round
13	(Russia) Sergey Karjakin	1½
116	(Indonesia) Susanto Megaranto	½
77	(Norway) Aryan Tari	½
52	(United States) Samuel Sevian	1½
45	(Azerbaijan) Arkadij Naiditsch	0
84	(Germany) Niclas Huschenbeth	2
109	(Norway) Frode Urkedal	½
20	(Russia) Nikita Vitiugov	1½
29	(India) Vidit Gujrathi	1½
100	(Argentina) Alan Pichot	½
93	(Russia) Aleksandr Rakhmanov	1½
36	(Sweden) Nils Grandelius	½
61	(Russia) Anton Demchenko	1½
68	(Armenia) Robert Hovhannisyan	½
125	(Costa Rica) Sergio Duran Vega	0
4	(United States) Wesley So	2

Quarter-finals
13	(Russia) Sergey Karjakin	2
52	(United States) Samuel Sevian	0
84	(Germany) Niclas Huschenbeth	1
20	(Russia) Nikita Vitiugov	3
29	(India) Vidit Gujrathi	1½
93	(Russia) Aleksandr Rakhmanov	½
61	(Russia) Anton Demchenko	½
4	(United States) Wesley So	1½

Third round
13	(Russia) Sergey Karjakin	½
20	(Russia) Nikita Vitiugov	1½
29	(India) Vidit Gujrathi	½
4	(United States) Wesley So	1½

Fourth round
20	(Russia) Nikita Vitiugov	1½
4	(United States) Wesley So	½

=== Section 5 ===
First round
3	(France) Maxime Vachier-Lagrave	2
126	(Nigeria) Daniel Anwuli	0
67	(Romania) Constantin Lupulescu	1½
62	(Latvia) Igor Kovalenko	2½
35	(England) Gawain Jones	1½
94	(Argentina) Diego Flores	½
99	(Peru) Jose Eduardo Martinez Alcantara	0
30	(Russia) Dmitry Jakovenko	2
19	(Russia) Peter Svidler	1½
110	(Cuba) Carlos Daniel Albornoz Cabrera	½
83	(Russia) Andrey Esipenko	1½
46	(Ukraine) Ruslan Ponomariov	½
51	(Germany) Liviu-Dieter Nisipeanu	2½
78	(Romania) Mircea Pârligras	1½
115	(Algeria) Bilel Bellahcene	1
14	(United States) Hikaru Nakamura	3

Quarter-finals
3	(France) Maxime Vachier-Lagrave	2
62	(Latvia) Igor Kovalenko	0
35	(England) Gawain Jones	1
30	(Russia) Dmitry Jakovenko	3
19	(Russia) Peter Svidler	3
83	(Russia) Andrey Esipenko	1
51	(Germany) Liviu-Dieter Nisipeanu	1½
14	(United States) Hikaru Nakamura	½

Third round
3	(France) Maxime Vachier-Lagrave	4½
30	(Russia) Dmitry Jakovenko	3½
19	(Russia) Peter Svidler	2½
51	(Germany) Liviu-Dieter Nisipeanu	1½

Fourth round
3	(France) Maxime Vachier-Lagrave	1½
19	(Russia) Peter Svidler	½

=== Section 6 ===
First round
11	(Russia) Vladislav Artemiev	1½
118	(Russia) Ilia Iljiushenok	½
75	(Egypt) Ahmed Adly	½
54	(Georgia (country)) Ivan Cheparinov	1½
43	(Ukraine) Anton Korobov	4
86	(India) Abhijeet Gupta	2
107	(Belarus) Aleksej Aleksandrov	1½
22	(Vietnam) Lê Quang Liêm	2½
27	(Russia) Maxim Matlakov	2½
102	(Uzbekistan) Nodirbek Abdusattorov	1½
91	(China) Lu Shanglei	2
38	(Israel) Boris Gelfand	4
59	(Iran) Parham Maghsoodloo	2
70	(Russia) Maksim Chigaev	0
123	(Egypt) Essam El Gindy	½
6	(Armenia) Levon Aronian	1½

Quarter-finals
11	(Russia) Vladislav Artemiev	1½
54	(Georgia (country)) Ivan Cheparinov	½
43	(Ukraine) Anton Korobov	½
22	(Vietnam) Lê Quang Liêm	1½
27	(Russia) Maxim Matlakov	2½
38	(Israel) Boris Gelfand	1½
59	(Iran) Parham Maghsoodloo	½
6	(Armenia) Levon Aronian	1½

Third round
11	(Russia) Vladislav Artemiev	2½
22	(Vietnam) Lê Quang Liêm	3½
27	(Russia) Maxim Matlakov	½
6	(Armenia) Levon Aronian	1½

Fourth round
22	(Vietnam) Lê Quang Liêm	2½
6	(Armenia) Levon Aronian	3½

=== Section 7 ===
First round
7	(Azerbaijan) Shakhriyar Mamedyarov	2
122	(Madagascar) Fy Antenaina Rakotomaharo	0
71	(Canada) Evgeny Bareev	½
58	(Uzbekistan) Rustam Kasimdzhanov	1½
39	(Peru) Jorge Cori	0
90	(India) Nihal Sarin	2
103	(Azerbaijan) Eltaj Safarli	3½
26	(United States) Sam Shankland	2½
23	(Czech Republic) David Navara	½
106	(Russia) Daniil Yuffa	1½
87	(Paraguay) Neuris Delgado Ramirez	1½
42	(England) Luke McShane	2½
55	(Russia) Sanan Sjugirov	2½
74	(Argentina) Sandro Mareco	1½
119	(Faroe Islands) Helgi Dam Ziska	½
10	(Azerbaijan) Teimour Radjabov	1½

Quarter-finals
7	(Azerbaijan) Shakhriyar Mamedyarov	1½
58	(Uzbekistan) Rustam Kasimdzhanov	½
90	(India) Nihal Sarin	1½
103	(Azerbaijan) Eltaj Safarli	2½
106	(Russia) Daniil Yuffa	5
42	(England) Luke McShane	3
55	(Russia) Sanan Sjugirov	1½
10	(Azerbaijan) Teimour Radjabov	2½

Third round
7	(Azerbaijan) Shakhriyar Mamedyarov	1½
103	(Azerbaijan) Eltaj Safarli	½
106	(Russia) Daniil Yuffa	½
10	(Azerbaijan) Teimour Radjabov	1½

Fourth round
7	(Azerbaijan) Shakhriyar Mamedyarov	2½
10	(Azerbaijan) Teimour Radjabov	3½

=== Section 8 ===
First round
15	(Russia) Dmitry Andreikin	2½
114	(Brazil) Krikor Mekhitarian	1½
79	(Kazakhstan) Rinat Jumabayev	1½
50	(Hungary) Ferenc Berkes	½
47	(Israel) Tamir Nabaty	3
82	(India) S. P. Sethuraman	1
111	(Chile) Cristobal Henriquez Villagra	½
18	(Poland) Jan-Krzysztof Duda	1½
31	(United States) Jeffery Xiong	2
98	(Russia) Igor Lysyj	0
95	(Iran) Amin Tabatabaei	2½
34	(Egypt) Bassem Amin	1½
63	(Hungary) Benjamin Gledura	½
66	(Russia) Evgeniy Najer	1½
127	(Bangladesh) Mohammad Fahad Rahman	0
2	(Netherlands) Anish Giri	2

Quarter-finals
15	(Russia) Dmitry Andreikin	1½
79	(Kazakhstan) Rinat Jumabayev	½
47	(Israel) Tamir Nabaty	0
18	(Poland) Jan-Krzysztof Duda	2
31	(United States) Jeffery Xiong	3
95	(Iran) Amin Tabatabaei	1
66	(Russia) Evgeniy Najer	4
2	(Netherlands) Anish Giri	5

Third round
15	(Russia) Dmitry Andreikin	½
18	(Poland) Jan-Krzysztof Duda	1½
31	(United States) Jeffery Xiong	3½
2	(Netherlands) Anish Giri	2½

Fourth round
18	(Poland) Jan-Krzysztof Duda	3½
31	(United States) Jeffery Xiong	4½

== Results, rounds 5–7 ==
Quarterfinals
1	(China) Ding Liren	½	1	1½
9	(Russia) Alexander Grischuk	½	0	½
12	(China) Yu Yangyi	½	½	4	5
20	(Russia) Nikita Vitiugov	½	½	3	4
3	(France) Maxime Vachier-Lagrave	½	½	1½	2½
6	(Armenia) Levon Aronian	½	½	½	1½
10	(Azerbaijan) Teimour Radjabov	½	1	1½
31	(United States) Jeffery Xiong	½	0	½

Semifinals
1	(China) Ding Liren	½	½	1½	2½
12	(China) Yu Yangyi	½	½	½	1½
3	(France) Maxime Vachier-Lagrave	½	0	½
10	(Azerbaijan) Teimour Radjabov	½	1	1½

Final (best of 4)
1	(China) Ding Liren	½	1	0	½	2	4
10	(Azerbaijan) Teimour Radjabov	½	0	1	½	4	6
Third place
12	(China) Yu Yangyi	½	½	½	½	0	2
3	(France) Maxime Vachier-Lagrave	½	½	½	½	2	4

=== Third place ===
Seed	Name	Aug 2019 rating	1	2	3	4	R1	R2	Total
12	(China) Yu Yangyi	2752	½	½	½	½	0	0	2
3	(France) Maxime Vachier-Lagrave	2778	½	½	½	½	1	1	4

=== Finals ===
Seed	Name	Aug 2019 rating	1	2	3	4	R1	R2	R3	R4	B1	B2	Total
1	(China) Ding Liren	2805	½	1	0	½	½	½	½	½	0	0	4
10	(Azerbaijan) Teimour Radjabov	2758	½	0	1	½	½	½	½	½	1	1	6
