= Champions Chess Tour 2023 =

Series of elite chess tournaments

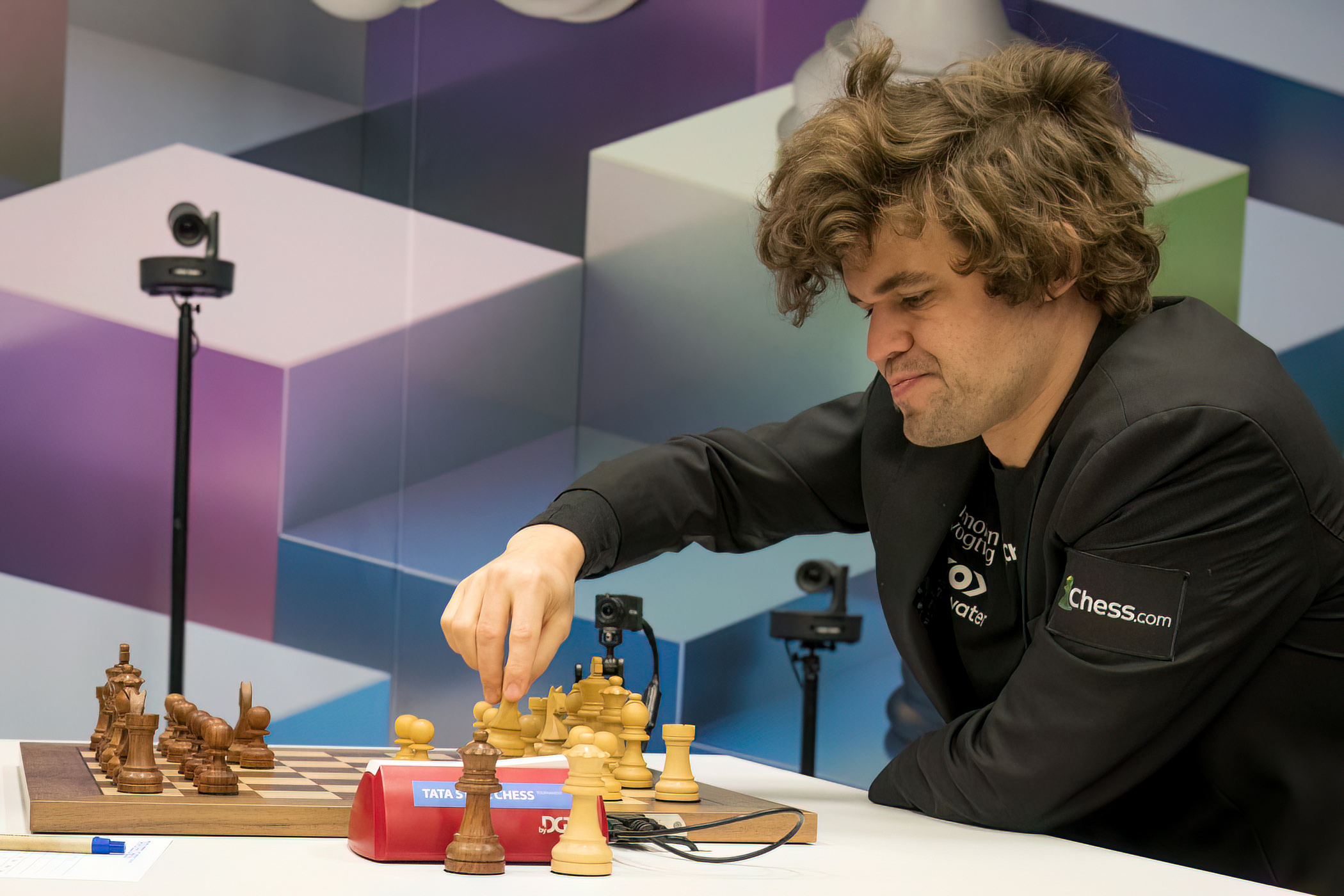
- Magnus Carlsen, winner of the tour

Details
- Duration: 6 February 2023 – 16 December 2023
- Tournaments: 7
- Categories: Regular (6); Finals (1)

Achievements (singles)
- Most titles: (Norway) Magnus Carlsen (4)
- Prize money leader: (Norway) Magnus Carlsen ($125,000)
- Points leader: (Norway) Magnus Carlsen (625)

The Champions Chess Tour (CCT) 2023 was a fast chess tournament circuit that was organized in 2023 by Chess.com. The tour started on 6 February 2023 and ended on 16 December 2023. It involved six online chess tournaments and an over-the-board final round, featuring some of the world's top players who played for a prize money pool of US$2 million.

== Organisation and format ==
With Chess.com's purchase of Play Magnus Group, the 2023 Champions Chess Tour took its format components from previous seasons of the Champions Chess Tour and Chess.com tournaments, such as the Chess.com World Championship. Some of these enhancements to the contest included open qualifications and a division structure to accommodate more players. There are also several inventive format tweaks that were created to increase excitement and make every match matter.

The new concept included six tournaments over the course of an entire online chess season, beginning with the Airthings Masters and continuing with playoffs and a knockout final. The qualifying tournaments of the Champions Chess Tour 2023 were open to all top 500 players in the rapid chess ranking. The tournaments consisted of six $235,000 tournaments. The top ten finishers in the overall standings got a share of $100,000 prize money. The top finishers on the leaderboard filled the remaining seats in the $500,000 end-of-year finals in December, leaving the event champions with a golden ticket, with eight players playing the semi-final and four playing the final in December 2023.

All titled players were allowed to compete in the qualifying rounds, with the exception of grandmasters, who were automatically entered into the play-in rounds. There were nine rounds of a Swiss-system tournament during qualifiers. The time limit was 10 minutes plus 2 seconds. The top three competitors in each competition had the chance to take part in the forthcoming Play-In.

== Tour points and prize money ==
=== Regular ===
The total prize pool for a Regular tournament is $235,000 for each tournament was distributed as follows:

==== Points ====
Finish	Division I	Division II	Division III
1st	150	50	20
2nd	100	30	15
3rd	75	20	10
4th	50	15	8
5th (x2)	30	10	6
7th (x2)	20	8	5
9th (x4)	-	6	4
13th (x4)	-	5	3
17th (x8)	-	-	2
25th (x8)	-	-	1

==== Prize Money ====
Finish	Division I	Division II	Division III
1st	$30,000	$10,000	$5,000
2nd	$20,000	$7,500	$3,600
3rd	$15,000	$6,000	$2,800
4th	$12,500	$5,000	$2,400
5th (x2)	$10,000	$4,500	$2,000
7th (x2)	$7,500	$4,000	$1,800
9th (x4)	-	$3,500	$1,600
13th (x4)	-	$3,000	$1,400
17th (x8)	-	-	$1,200
25th (x8)	-	-	$1,000
Total	$112,500	$71,500	$51,000

=== Playoffs and Finals ===
The Playoffs and Finals have a $500,000 purse.

Placing	Prize
1st	$200,000
2nd	$100,000
3rd (x2)	$50,000
5th	$25,000
6th	$20,000
7th	$15,000
8th	$12,000
Per Playoff match win	$1,000

=== Leaderboard prizes ===
After the end of the sixth event, players also earn their share of the $100,000 prize fund according to their CCT Tour Point standings.

Placing	Prize
1st	$25,000
2nd	$20,000
3rd	$16,000
4th	$12,000
5th	$9,000
6th	$7,000
7th	$5,000
8th	$3,000
9th	$2,000
10th	$1,000

== Tournament schedule and results ==
Champions Chess Tour tournaments
Tournament	Dates	Prize	Division I				Winner of Division II	Winner of Division III
Tournament	Dates	Prize	Winner	Second (or finalist)	Third	Fourth	Winner of Division II	Winner of Division III
Airthings Masters	February 6–10	$235,000	(Norway) Magnus Carlsen	(United States) Hikaru Nakamura	(United States) Wesley So	(India) Arjun Erigaisi	(United States) Fabiano Caruana	(United States) Samuel Sevian
Chessable Masters	April 3–7	$235,000	(United States) Hikaru Nakamura	(United States) Fabiano Caruana	(Norway) Magnus Carlsen	(United States) Levon Aronian	(Uzbekistan) Nodirbek Abdusattorov	(Iran) Amin Tabatabaei
ChessKid Cup	May 22–26	$235,000	(Uzbekistan) Nodirbek Abdusattorov	(United States) Fabiano Caruana	(Netherlands) Jorden Van Foreest	(France) Jules Moussard	(Slovenia) Vladimir Fedoseev	(Argentina) Alan Pichot
Aimchess Rapid	July 10–14	$235,000	(Norway) Magnus Carlsen	(United States) Wesley So	(Uzbekistan) Nodirbek Abdusattorov	(Spain) Eduardo Iturrizaga	(Belarus) Denis Lazavik	(China) Yu Yangyi
Julius Baer Generation Cup	August 30 – September 3	$235,000	(Norway) Magnus Carlsen	(France) Alireza Firouzja	(Belarus) Denis Lazavik	(Uzbekistan) Nodirbek Abdusattorov	(FIDE) Ian Nepomniachtchi	(United States) Samuel Sevian
AI Cup	September 25–29	$235,000	(France) Maxime Vachier-Lagrave	(Norway) Magnus Carlsen	(FIDE) Ian Nepomniachtchi	(Netherlands) Anish Giri	(Slovenia) Vladimir Fedoseev	(United States) Samuel Sevian
Final	December 15–22	$500,000	(Norway) Magnus Carlsen	(United States) Wesley So				

== Standings ==
Prize money is shown in US dollars. Bold number denotes a win in that division.

Legend
Did not qualify/participate	Division I	Division II	Division III

Pos	Name	Airthings Masters	Chessable Masters	ChessKid Cup	Aimchess Rapid	Julius Baer Generation Cup	AI Cup	Total Points	Prize Money
1	(Norway) Magnus Carlsen	150	75		150	150	100	625	$125,000
2	(United States) Fabiano Caruana	50	100	100	30	30	15	325	$75,000
2	(Uzbekistan) Nodirbek Abdusattorov		50	150	75	50		325	$67,500
4	(United States) Hikaru Nakamura	100	150	20			20	290	$65,000
5	(United States) Wesley So	75	30		100	30		235	$55,000
6	(France) Alireza Firouzja	20		30		100	30	180	$47,500
6	(France) Maxime Vachier-Lagrave		30				150	180	$37,500
8	(Belarus) Denis Lazavik	10	10	10	50	75	20	175	$44,300
9	(Slovenia) Vladimir Fedoseev		20	50	20	8	50	148	$39,000
10	(FIDE) Ian Nepomniachtchi	6				50	75	131	$28,500
11	(United States) Levon Aronian		50		30	30		110	$30,000
12	(United States) Samuel Sevian	20	3	5	30	20	20	98	$25,700
13	(Netherlands) Jorden van Foreest			75	20			95	$22,500
14	(FIDE) Vladislav Artemiev		30			20	30	80	$23,500
14	(Azerbaijan) Shakhriyar Mamedyarov		5	30		15	30	80	$22,900
16	(Netherlands) Anish Giri		20			5	50	75	$20,300
17	(China) Yu Yangyi	30	15	4	20			69	$19,100
18	(Serbia) Alexey Sarana	30	15		5	6	10	66	$24,600
19	(Spain) Eduardo Iturrizaga		4	1	50	5		60	$18,100
20	(India) Arjun Erigaisi	50	6					56	$16,000
21	(Iran) Amin Tabatabaei	3	20		10	20		53	$18,400
22	(France) Jules Moussard			50				50	$12,500
23	(Azerbaijan) Rauf Mamedov	20			6	6	15	47	$16,600
24	(FIDE) Dmitry Andreikin	6		15	6	5	10	42	$16,800
25	(Vietnam) Lê Quang Liêm	1	20	8	10			39	$15,300
25	(Vietnam) Lê Tuấn Minh	4	5	8	15	6	1	39	$15,200
27	(Ukraine) Pavel Eljanov			6	2	20	6	34	$15,700
28	(Spain) Alan Pichot	5	1	20	4	1		31	$11,600
28	(India) Gukesh D	30	1					31	$11,000
28	(Peru) Jose Martinez	5	2		20		4	31	$10,600
31	(FIDE) Vladimir Kramnik	10	10		4	3	3	30	$13,400
31	(United States) Gata Kamsky		6	6	10	8		30	$10,900
31	(Uzbekistan) Nodirbek Yakubboev	20				10		30	$10,500
31	(Germany) Dmitrij Kollars			30				30	$10,000
35	(Vietnam) Nguyễn Ngọc Trường Sơn		5	20				25	$7,800
36	(Ukraine) Yuriy Kuzubov					4	20	24	$7,600
37	(Armenia) Aram Hakobyan	2			15	1	5	23	$10,200
37	(India) R Praggnanandhaa	15	8					23	$7,600
39	(FIDE) Alexey Dreev	6	6		5	5		22	$11,500
39	(Germany) Matthias Blübaum	8	8	3	1	2		22	$10,000
39	(FIDE) Aleksandr Shimanov		2	20				22	$8,700
42	(Israel) Evgeny Alekseev				1	10	10	21	$8,300
43	(Uruguay) Georg Meier		5	6	2	2	5	20	$10,700
43	(India) Raunak Sadhwani	5	5	10				20	$10,500
43	(United States) Grigoriy Oparin	4	6	10				20	$9,600
43	(Ukraine) Olexandr Bortnyk	10				10		20	$5,600
47	(Germany) Vincent Keymer	1	8	2			8	19	$10,200
48	(Ukraine) Martyn Kravtsiv	6	3	5			3	17	$9,300
49	(United States) Leinier Domínguez				8		8	16	$6,400
50	(FIDE) David Paravyan		4	1	8		2	15	$7,800
50	(Serbia) Alexandr Predke	15						15	$5,000
50	(Egypt) Amin Bassem					15		15	$5,000
50	(India) Pentala Harikrishna			15				15	$3,600
54	(Spain) Maksim Chigaev		5	2		5	2	14	$8,400
54	(FIDE) Daniil Dubov	8	6					14	$7,500
54	(Uzbekistan) Shamsiddin Vokhidov	1	10			2	1	14	$6,000
57	(Iran) Parham Maghsoodloo	5			6	1	1	13	$7,300
58	(Croatia) Ivan Šarić				6		6	12	$7,000
58	(Hungary) Benjámin Gledura			2	3	2	5	12	$6,800
58	(Spain) David Antón Guijarro		4	6	2			12	$6,300
58	(United States) Jeffery Xiong				8		4	12	$5,600
62	(FIDE) Mikhail Antipov	2		4			5	11	$5,800
62	(France) Laurent Fressinet				5	6		11	$5,300
62	(Azerbaijan) Vasif Durarbayli	2			3		6	11	$4,600
65	(FIDE) Andrey Esipenko					8	2	10	$5,200
66	(Ukraine) Vitaliy Bernadskiy			8	1			9	$3,400
66	(Netherlands) Benjamin Bok			3		6		9	$3,400
68	(Azerbaijan) Vugar Rasulov		2	5		1		8	$5,200
68	(United Arab Emirates) Salem Saleh	6	2					8	$4,700
68	(Armenia) Samvel Ter-Sahakyan				6	2		8	$4,700
68	(Greece) Nikolas Theodorou	4				4		8	$3,200
68	(United States) Aleksandr Lenderman	8						8	$2,400
68	(United States) Ray Robson						8	8	$2,400
74	(Ukraine) Igor Kovalenko			1	5	1		7	$5,000
74	(Austria) Kirill Alekseenko		1	6				7	$4,500
74	(Azerbaijan) Aydin Suleymanli				1	6		7	$4,500
74	(Argentina) Diego Flores				5	2		7	$4,200
74	(Spain) Francisco Vallejo Pons		3	4				7	$3,000
74	(Georgia (country)) Levan Pantsulaia		2		5			7	$3,000
80	(Azerbaijan) Eltaj Safarli	1					5	6	$4,000
80	(FIDE) Maxim Matlakov	3			1		2	6	$3,600
80	(FIDE) Rudik Makarian		2			3	1	6	$3,600
80	(Netherlands) Robby Kevlishvili				6			6	$3,500
80	(United States) Hans Niemann						6	6	$3,500
80	(Poland) Jan-Krzysztof Duda						6	6	$3,500
80	(FIDE) Alexander Grischuk	2			4			6	$2,800
80	(India) Pranav V	6						6	$2,000
80	(China) Wei Yi		6					6	$2,000
80	(Czech Republic) David Navara			6				6	$2,000
80	(FIDE) Anton Demchenko						6	6	$2,000
91	(Azerbaijan) Gadir Guseinov	2			1		2	5	$3,400
91	(Romania) Bogdan-Daniel Deac	5						5	$3,000
91	(India) Diptayan Ghosh	5						5	$3,000
91	(India) Bharath Subramaniyam			5				5	$3,000
91	(Armenia) Mamikon Gharibyan			5				5	$3,000
91	(India) Nihal Sarin					5		5	$3,000
91	(Azerbaijan) Mahammad Muradli	2					3	5	$2,600
91	(Spain) Alvar Alonso Rosell		4		1			5	$2,600
91	(Germany) Alexander Donchenko			5				5	$1,800
91	(FIDE) Evgeny Tomashevsky						5	5	$1,800
101	(India) Vaibhav Suri			2			2	4	$2,400
101	(FIDE) Mikhail Demidov	4						4	$1,600
101	(FIDE) Igor Lysyj			4				4	$1,600
101	(FIDE) Pavel Smirnov				4			4	$1,600
101	(France) Etienne Bacrot					4		4	$1,600
101	(Chile) Pablo Salinas Herrera					4		4	$1,600
101	(Azerbaijan) Teimour Radjabov						4	4	$1,600
101	(FIDE) Vladislav Kovalev						4	4	$1,600
109	(India) P. Iniyan	2		1				3	$2,200
109	(Hungary) Sanan Sjugirov	1			2			3	$2,200
109	(Norway) Aryan Tari		1	2				3	$2,200
109	(FIDE) Vladimir Malakhov		1				2	3	$2,200
109	(Turkey) Mustafa Yılmaz				2		1	3	$2,200
109	(Armenia) Shant Sargsyan					2	1	3	$2,200
109	(United States) Christopher Yoo	3						3	$1,400
109	(FIDE) Peter Svidler	3						3	$1,400
109	(Brazil) Alexandr Fier		3					3	$1,400
109	(India) Harshit Raja			3				3	$1,400
109	(Spain) Miguel Santos Ruiz			3				3	$1,400
109	(Argentina) Federico Perez Ponsa				3			3	$1,400
109	(United States) Timur Gareyev				3			3	$1,400
109	(Romania) Constantin Lupulescu					3		3	$1,400
109	(Spain) Jaime Santos Latasa					3		3	$1,400
109	(Netherlands) Thomas Beerdsen						3	3	$1,400
125	(FIDE) Arseniy Nesterov	2						2	$1,200
125	(Czech Republic) Peter Michalik		2					2	$1,200
125	(Germany) Rasmus Svane		2					2	$1,200
125	(Paraguay) Axel Bachmann			2				2	$1,200
125	(India) Harshvardhan GB			2				2	$1,200
125	(Peru) Renato Terry			2				2	$1,200
125	(Armenia) Hovhannes Gabuzyan				2			2	$1,200
125	(Brazil) Krikor Mekhitarian				2			2	$1,200
125	(Azerbaijan) Read Samadov				2			2	$1,200
125	(India) Aradhya Garg					2		2	$1,200
125	(FIDE) Aleksandr Rakhmanov						2	2	$1,200
136	(Chile) Rodrigo Vásquez Schroeder	1						1	$1,000
136	(FIDE) Sergey Drygalov	1						1	$1,000
136	(China) Xu Xiangyu	1						1	$1,000
136	(FIDE) Dmitry Frolyanov		1					1	$1,000
136	(FIDE) Klementy Sychev		1					1	$1,000
136	(FIDE) Sergei Lobanov		1					1	$1,000
136	(Azerbaijan) Abdulla Gadimbayli			1				1	$1,000
136	(United States) Andrew Tang			1				1	$1,000
136	(India) Krishnan Sasikiran			1				1	$1,000
136	(India) Srinath Narayanan			1				1	$1,000
136	(United States) Abhimanyu Mishra				1			1	$1,000
136	(Iran) Bardiya Daneshvar					1		1	$1,000
136	(Latvia) Nikita Meshkovs					1		1	$1,000
136	(Serbia) Velimir Ivic					1		1	$1,000
136	(Azerbaijan) Vugar Asadli						1	1	$1,000
136	(Israel) Ori Kobo						1	1	$1,000

== Tournaments details ==
=== Airthings Masters ===
This initial tournament started on 6 February and ended on 10 February. Both a Play-in stage that is open to all grandmasters and a Knockout stage with three categories are available at the Airthings Masters. The prize pools for each category are distinct, and players can gain Tour Points according on the division they competed in and their finish. The players who have earned the most Tour Points by the tour's sixth event qualify for the CCT Playoff. Magnus Carlsen won the tournament after defeating Hikaru Nakamura in Division I finals. Fabiano Caruana won Division II after defeating Yu Yangyi.

==== Division I Play-off ====
Champion Round 1	Champion Round 2	Champion Final	Final
(Norway) Magnus Carlsen	2½
(FIDE) Alexey Sarana	½
(Norway) Magnus Carlsen	2½ (Note: Advanced further by drawing armageddon game with black)
(India) Arjun Erigaisi	2½
(France) Alireza Firouzja	0
(India) Arjun Erigaisi	3
(Norway) Magnus Carlsen	2½
(United States) Hikaru Nakamura	2½
(Azerbaijan) Rauf Mamedov	1½
(United States) Wesley So	2½
(United States) Wesley So	2½
(United States) Hikaru Nakamura	2½
(United States) Hikaru Nakamura	2½
(India) Gukesh D	½	(Norway) Magnus Carlsen	2½
(United States) Hikaru Nakamura	1½
Elimination Round 1	Elimination Round 2	Elimination Round 3	Elimination Final
(FIDE) Alexey Sarana	0
(FIDE) Alexey Sarana	2	(United States) Wesley So	2	(United States) Wesley So	1
(France) Alireza Firouzja	0	(United States) Wesley So	1½	(United States) Hikaru Nakamura	2
(India) Arjun Erigaisi	½
(India) Gukesh D	½
(Azerbaijan) Rauf Mamedov	1	(India) Arjun Erigaisi	1½
(India) Gukesh D	2

=== Chessable Masters ===
==== Division I Play-off ====
Champion Round 1	Champion Round 2	Champion Final	Final
(Norway) Magnus Carlsen	2
(FIDE) Vladislav Artemiev	3
(FIDE) Vladislav Artemiev	2½
(United States) Fabiano Caruana	2½
(United States) Fabiano Caruana	3
(Vietnam) Lê Quang Liêm	2
(United States) Fabiano Caruana	2½
(United States) Hikaru Nakamura	½
(United States) Hikaru Nakamura	2½
(FIDE) Vladimir Fedoseev	2½
(United States) Hikaru Nakamura	2½
(United States) Wesley So	1½
(United States) Levon Aronian	1½
(United States) Wesley So	2½	(United States) Fabiano Caruana	1	1
(United States) Hikaru Nakamura	3	2
Elimination Round 1	Elimination Round 2	Elimination Round 3	Elimination Final
(United States) Wesley So	½
(Norway) Magnus Carlsen	1½	(Norway) Magnus Carlsen	1½	(Norway) Magnus Carlsen	1
(Vietnam) Lê Quang Liêm	1½	(Norway) Magnus Carlsen	2	(United States) Hikaru Nakamura	2
(United States) Levon Aronian	0
(FIDE) Vladislav Artemiev	1½
(FIDE) Vladimir Fedoseev	½	(United States) Levon Aronian	1½
(United States) Levon Aronian	1½

=== ChessKid Cup ===
==== Division I Play-off ====
Champion Round 1	Champion Round 2	Champion Final	Final
(United States) Hikaru Nakamura	1½
(Netherlands) Jorden van Foreest	2½
(Netherlands) Jorden van Foreest	2½
(Germany) Dmitrij Kollars	1½
(France) Alireza Firouzja	2
(Germany) Dmitrij Kollars	3
(Netherlands) Jorden van Foreest	1½
(Uzbekistan) Nodirbek Abdusattorov	2½
(United States) Fabiano Caruana	2½
(FIDE) Aleksandr Shimanov	½
(United States) Fabiano Caruana	1½
(Uzbekistan) Nodirbek Abdusattorov	2½
(France) Jules Moussard	½
(Uzbekistan) Nodirbek Abdusattorov	2½	(Uzbekistan) Nodirbek Abdusattorov	2½
(United States) Fabiano Caruana	1½
Elimination Round 1	Elimination Round 2	Elimination Round 3	Elimination Final
(United States) Fabiano Caruana	2
(United States) Hikaru Nakamura	½	(France) Alireza Firouzja	0	(Netherlands) Jorden van Foreest	1
(France) Alireza Firouzja	1½	(United States) Fabiano Caruana	1½	(United States) Fabiano Caruana	2
(France) Jules Moussard	1½
(France) Jules Moussard	2
(France) Jules Moussard	2	(Germany) Dmitrij Kollars	1
(FIDE) Aleksandr Shimanov	0

=== Aimchess Rapid ===
==== Division I Play-off ====
Champion Round 1	Champion Round 2	Champion Final	Final
(Uzbekistan) Nodirbek Abdusattorov	3
(United States) Wesley So	2
(Uzbekistan) Nodirbek Abdusattorov	2 ½
(United States) Levon Aronian	½
(FIDE) Vladimir Fedoseev	1 ½
(United States) Levon Aronian	2 ½
(Uzbekistan) Nodirbek Abdusattorov	½
(Norway) Magnus Carlsen	2 ½
(United States) Fabiano Caruana	2 ½
(Spain) Eduardo Iturrizaga	½
(United States) Fabiano Caruana	1 ½
(Norway) Magnus Carlsen	2 ½
(Norway) Magnus Carlsen	2 ½
(Netherlands) Jorden Van Foreest	½	(Norway) Magnus Carlsen	3
(United States) Wesley So	1
Elimination Round 1	Elimination Round 2	Elimination Round 3	Elimination Final
(United States) Fabiano Caruana	0
(United States) Wesley So	1½	(United States) Wesley So	2	(Uzbekistan) Nodirbek Abdusattorov	½
(FIDE) Vladimir Fedoseev	1 ½	(United States) Wesley So	1½	(United States) Wesley So	1½
(Spain) Eduardo Iturrizaga	½
(United States) Levon Aronian	0
(Spain) Eduardo Iturrizaga	2	(Spain) Eduardo Iturrizaga	2
(Netherlands) Jorden Van Foreest	1

=== Julius Baer Generation Cup ===
==== Division I Play-off ====
Champion Round 1	Champion Round 2	Champion Final	Final
(Norway) Magnus Carlsen	2½
(Iran) Amin Tabatabaei	½
(Norway) Magnus Carlsen	2½
(United States) Fabiano Caruana	1½
(FIDE) Denis Lazavik	2
(United States) Fabiano Caruana	3
(Norway) Magnus Carlsen	3
(France) Alireza Firouzja	0
(United States) Wesley So	3
(Ukraine) Pavel Eljanov	0
(United States) Wesley So	1½
(France) Alireza Firouzja	2½
(Uzbekistan) Nodirbek Abdusattorov	0
(France) Alireza Firouzja	3	(Norway) Magnus Carlsen	3
(France) Alireza Firouzja	2
Elimination Round 1	Elimination Round 2	Elimination Round 3	Elimination Final
(United States) Wesley So	1
(Iran) Amin Tabatabaei	1	(FIDE) Denis Lazavik	2	(France) Alireza Firouzja	1½
(FIDE) Denis Lazavik	2	(FIDE) Denis Lazavik	1½	(FIDE) Denis Lazavik	½
(Uzbekistan) Nodirbek Abdusattorov	½
(United States) Fabiano Caruana	1
(Ukraine) Pavel Eljanov	½	(Uzbekistan) Nodirbek Abdusattorov	2
(Uzbekistan) Nodirbek Abdusattorov	1½

=== AI Cup ===
==== Division I Play-off ====
Champion Round 1	Champion Round 2	Champion Final	Final
(Norway) Magnus Carlsen	2½
(United States) Hikaru Nakamura	½
(Norway) Magnus Carlsen	2½
(FIDE) Ian Nepomniachtchi	1½
(FIDE) Ian Nepomniachtchi	2½
(Netherlands) Anish Giri	½
(Norway) Magnus Carlsen	3
(France) Maxime Vachier-Lagrave	2
(France) Alireza Firouzja	1
(France) Maxime Vachier-Lagrave	3
(France) Maxime Vachier-Lagrave	3
(Azerbaijan) Shakhriyar Mamedyarov	1
(FIDE) Denis Lazavik	2
(Azerbaijan) Shakhriyar Mamedyarov	3 (Note: Advanced further by winning armageddon game with white)	(Norway) Magnus Carlsen	1½	0
(France) Maxime Vachier-Lagrave	2½	2
Elimination Round 1	Elimination Round 2	Elimination Round 3	Elimination Final
(Azerbaijan) Shakhriyar Mamedyarov	0
(United States) Hikaru Nakamura	0	(Netherlands) Anish Giri	2	(France) Maxime Vachier-Lagrave	2
(Netherlands) Anish Giri	2	(Netherlands) Anish Giri	½	(FIDE) Ian Nepomniachtchi	0
(FIDE) Ian Nepomniachtchi	1½
(FIDE) Ian Nepomniachtchi	2
(France) Alireza Firouzja	1½	(France) Alireza Firouzja	1
(FIDE) Denis Lazavik	½

=== Tour Finals ===
Top 8 in the Tour standings are invited to the Tour Finals, played live over-the-board in Toronto, Canada.

==== Round-robin stage ====
Every player played two-game matches against each of other players with a time control of 15+3. If a match is tied, an armageddon game is played to decide the winner of the match, using bidding system to decide playing time and color (base time of 15 minutes). First and second place directly qualified to semifinals, third to sixth place advanced to the survival stage, while the last two places are eliminated.

Champion Chess Tour Finals, round-robin stage, 10 – 13 December 2023, Toronto, Canada
	Player	Rating	1	2	3	4	5	6	7	8	MP	H2H
1	Wesley So (USA)	2737		½ ½ 1	½ ½ 0	½ ½ ½*	0 1 ½*	1 ½	½ ½ 1	1 ½	6	1
2	Magnus Carlsen (Norway)	2818	½ ½ 0		½ 1	½ ½ 1	1 ½	½ ½ 1	0 1 1	1 ½	6	0
3	Fabiano Caruana (USA)	2762	½ ½ 1	½ 0		0 0	1 0 1	½ ½ 1	0 1 ½*	1 ½	5	
4	Nodirbek Abdusattorov (Uzbekistan)	2727	½ ½ ½	½ ½ 0	1 1		½ ½ 1	0 1 1	½ 0	½ ½ 1	4	
5	Maxime Vachier-Lagrave (France)	2767	1 0 ½	0 ½	0 1 0	½ ½ 0		½ ½ 1	1 ½	½ ½ 0	2	2
6	Hikaru Nakamura (USA)	2731	0 ½	½ ½ 0	½ ½ 0	1 0 0	½ ½ 0		1 1	1 1	2	1
7	Alireza Firouzja (France)	2737	½ ½ 0	1 0 0	1 0 ½	½ 1	0 ½	0 0		½ ½ ½*	2	0
8	Denis Lazavik (FIDE)	2509	0 ½	0 ½	0 ½	½ ½ 0	½ ½ 1	0 0	½ ½ ½		1	

* - Match win by drawing armageddon game with black

=== Survival stage ===
Third and fourth place from round-robin stage played a match, with the winner advances to semifinals. Fifth and sixth place also played a match, with the winner playing the loser of 3rd vs 4th for the last spot of the semifinals. Each match consisted of two games with armageddon tiebreak.

3rd-4th place match
	Player	1	2	A
3	(United States) Fabiano Caruana	1	0	1
4	(Uzbekistan) Nodirbek Abdusattorov	0	1	0

5th-6th place match
	Player	1	2	A
5	(France) Maxime Vachier-Lagrave	1	0	½
6	(United States) Hikaru Nakamura	0	1	½

4th-5th place match
	Player	1	2	A
4	(Uzbekistan) Nodirbek Abdusattorov	½	½	½
6	(United States) Hikaru Nakamura	½	½	½

=== Semifinals and finals ===
Four players played a single-elimination bracket to decide the champion. Each match was played as best-of-three sets, with set 1 and 2 consisting of four games, and final set consisting of two games. If a set is drawn, an armageddon game is played.

Semifinals
1	(United States) Wesley So	1½	2½	2
4	(Uzbekistan) Nodirbek Abdusattorov	2½	1½	1
2	(Norway) Magnus Carlsen	3	3
3	(United States) Fabiano Caruana	2	2

Final
1	(United States) Wesley So	1½	1½
2	(Norway) Magnus Carlsen	2½	2½

Semifinal 1
	Player	Set 1				Set 2				Set 3		
	Player	1	2	3	4	1	2	3	4	1	2	A
1	(United States) Wesley So	1	0	0	½	1	1	0	½	½	½	1
4	(Uzbekistan) Nodirbek Abdusattorov	0	1	1	½	0	0	1	½	½	½	0

Semifinal 2
	Player	Set 1					Set 2				
	Player	1	2	3	4	A	1	2	3	4	A
2	(Norway) Magnus Carlsen	1	0	0	1	1	½	½	1	0	1
3	(United States) Fabiano Caruana	0	1	1	0	0	½	½	0	1	0

Final
	Player	Set 1				Set 2			
	Player	1	2	3	4	1	2	3	4
1	(United States) Wesley So	½	½	0	½	0	1	½	0
2	(Norway) Magnus Carlsen	½	½	1	½	1	0	½	1
