= Niclas Huschenbeth =

German chess grandmaster (born 1992)

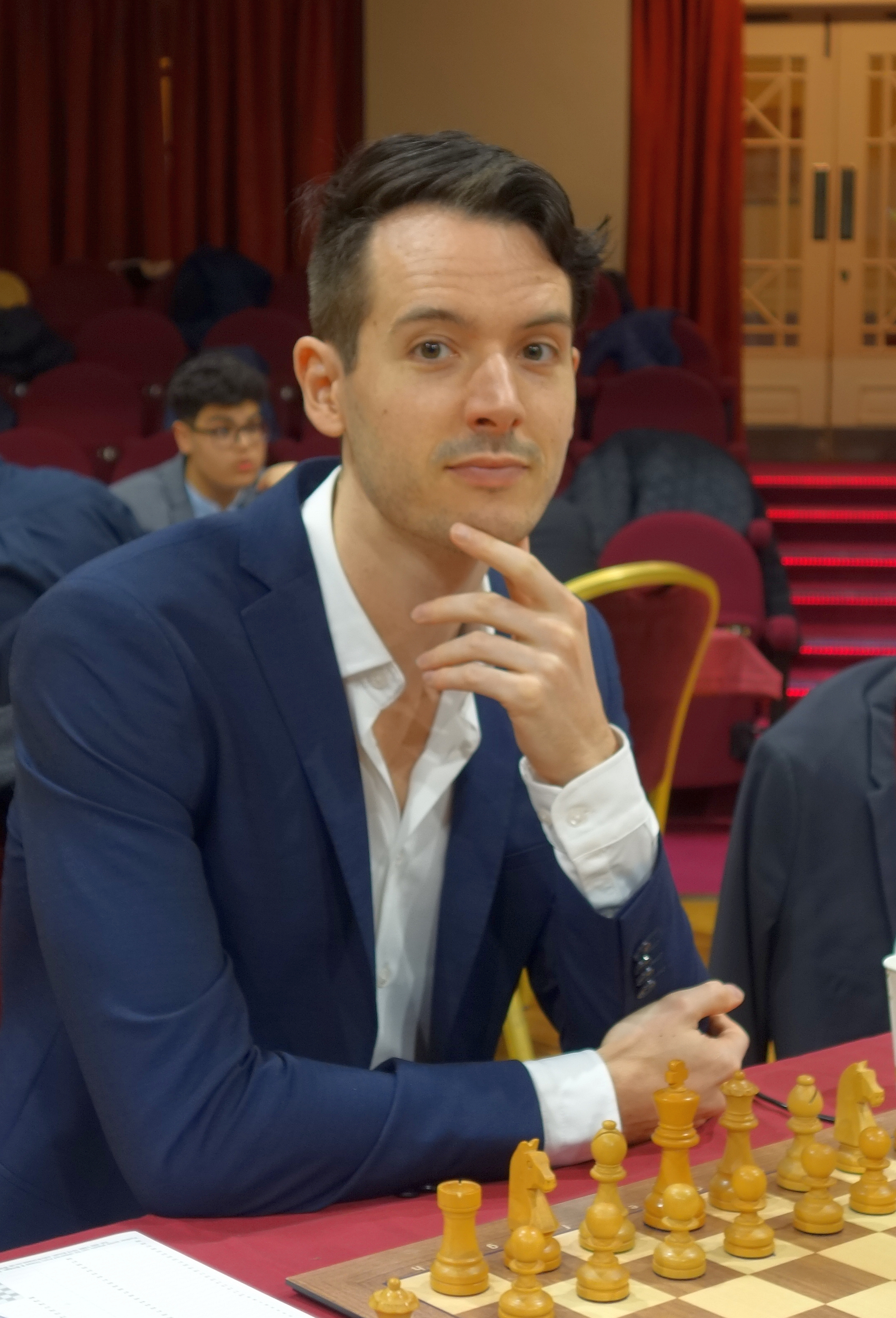
- Huschenbeth in 2023

Personal information
- Born: 29 February 1992 (age 34) Hann. Münden, Germany

Chess career
- Country: Germany
- Title: Grandmaster (2012)
- FIDE rating: 2586 (July 2026)
- Peak rating: 2628 (November 2019)

YouTube information
- Channel: GM Huschenbeth
- Years active: 2012–present
- Subscribers: 113 thousand
- Views: 37 million

Niclas Huschenbeth (born 29 February 1992) is a German chess grandmaster and a two-time German Chess Champion (2010, 2019). He played in the Chess Olympiads of 2008 and 2010.

== Chess career ==
Huschenbeth won the German championship in 2010. He came first in the 2011 HSK Großmeisterturnier in Hamburg. He came third in the 2013 National Chess Congress in Philadelphia.

In March 2016, Huschenbeth earned clear first place in the Charlotte Chess Center's GM Norm Invitational held in Charlotte, North Carolina with an undefeated score of 7.0/9.

In 2019, Huschenbeth won the German championship for the second time with 8 out of 9 points, beating Dmitrij Kollars due to the higher average Elo rating of his opponents. He tied 3rd to 11th place in the 2019 European Individual Championship with Kacper Piorun, David Anton Guijarro, Ferenc Berkes, Sergei Movsesian, Liviu-Dieter Nisipeanu, Grigoriy Oparin, Maxim Rodshtein, and Eltaj Safarli.

Huschenbeth has worked as a second for Hikaru Nakamura since 2019, including for the 2022 Candidates Tournament in Madrid and for the FIDE Candidates Tournament 2024. In the episode "Zugzwang" of the crime series Tatort, which aired in April 2025, Huschenbeth played the commentator.
