= Airthings Masters =

Airthings Masters can refer to three online chess tournaments:

- 2020 Airthings Masters, a chess tournament that was part of the Champions Chess Tour 2021 from November 2020–October 2021
- 2022 Airthings Masters, a chess tournament that was part of the Champions Chess Tour 2022 from February–November 2022
- 2023 Airthings Masters, a chess tournament that was part of the Champions Chess Tour 2023
