= David Antón Guijarro =

Spanish chess grandmaster (born 1995)

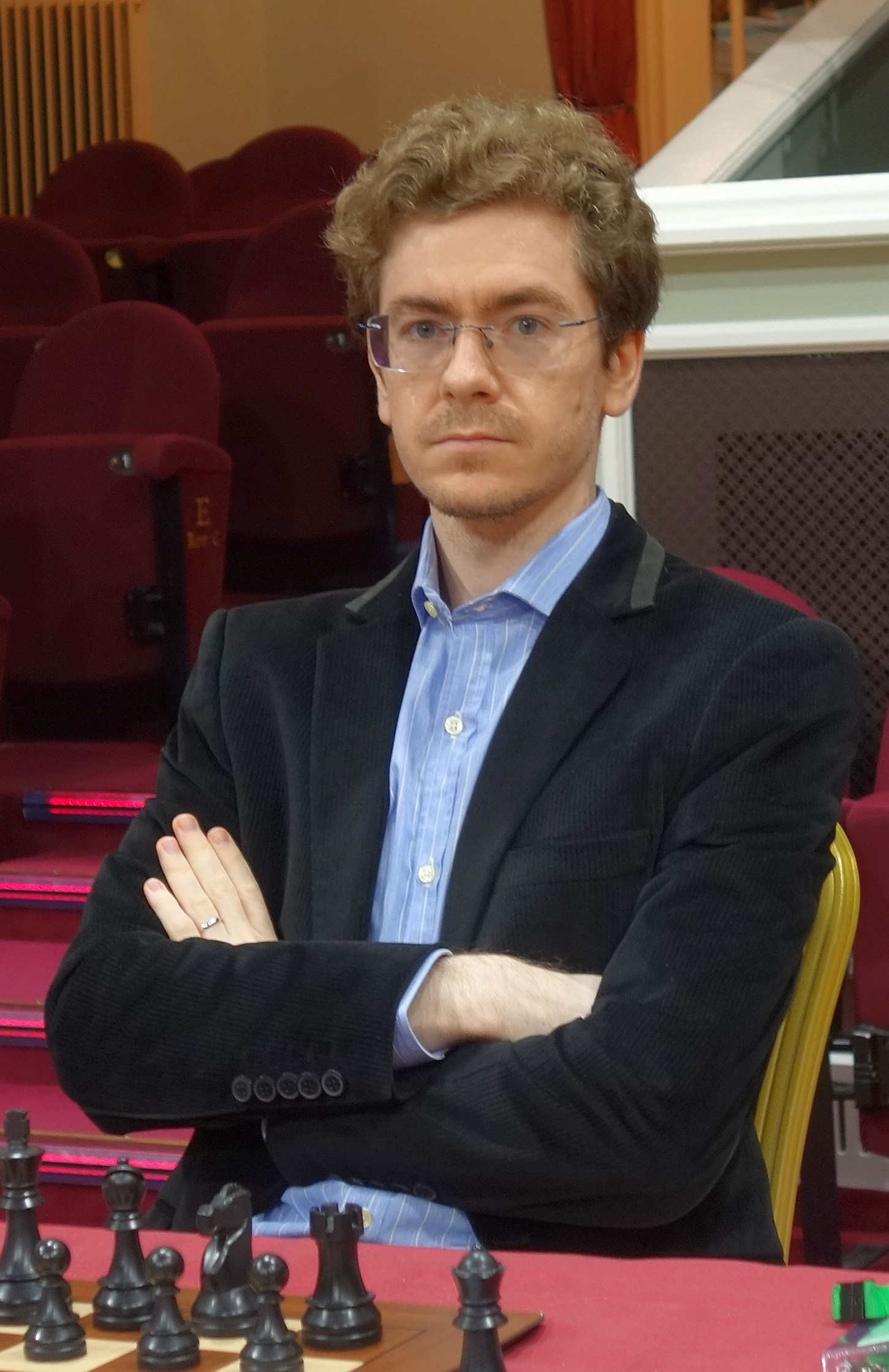
- Antón in 2023

Personal information
- Born: 23 June 1995 (age 31) Murcia, Spain

Chess career
- Country: Spain
- Title: Grandmaster (2013)
- FIDE rating: 2632 (September 2026)
- Peak rating: 2703 (March 2020)
- Ranking: No. 89 (September 2026)
- Peak ranking: No. 35 (March 2020)

David Antón Guijarro (born 23 June 1995) is a Spanish chess grandmaster. He was awarded the title of Grandmaster by FIDE in 2013, at the age of 18. He has competed at two Chess Olympiads.

== Chess career ==
Antón Guijarro won the Spanish championship eight times in various age groups and formats. He took the bronze medal at the 2012 European Youth Chess Championships, held in Prague, in the U16 category; the next year, he took silver in the World Youth Chess Championships in Al Ain in the U18 section. Antón Guijarro was awarded the title of International Master by FIDE in 2012 and progressed to the grandmaster title in 2013.

In the 2014 European Individual Chess Championship, he won the silver medal, qualifying also for the FIDE World Cup 2015, and tied for second place in the European Blitz Championship. In the same year Antón Guijarro also won the Spanish Blitz Championship, held in Sabiote, finishing ahead of Spain's first ranking grandmaster, Francisco Vallejo Pons.

In June 2016, he took part in the 29th Magistral Ciudad de León tournament with Jaime Santos Latasa, Viswanathan Anand and Wei Yi. In October David Antón won the Magistral d'Escacs Ciutat de Barcelona round-robin tournament (ca) on tiebreak over Jan-Krzysztof Duda.

Being the sole leader after 9 rounds, beating Veselin Topalov and Boris Gelfand, the grandmaster took the second place after a three-way tiebreak against Yu Yangyi and Hikaru Nakamura at the 2017 Tradewise Gibraltar Masters open tournament.

He tied 3rd to 11th place in the 2019 European Individual Championship with Kacper Piorun, Ferenc Berkes, Niclas Huschenbeth, Sergei Movsesian, Liviu-Dieter Nisipeanu, Grigoriy Oparin, Maxim Rodshtein, and Eltaj Safarli.

In January 2020 he won the Tata Steel Challengers tournament, qualifying for the 2021 Masters Tournament.

== Personal life ==
Born in Murcia, Antón Guijarro grew up in Madrid. He started playing chess at the age of 5 under the guidance of his father. He took mathematics in the Complutense University of Madrid, though he has now devoted himself to chess full-time under the training of International Master David Martínez.
