= Ferenc Berkes =

Hungarian chess grandmaster (born 1985)

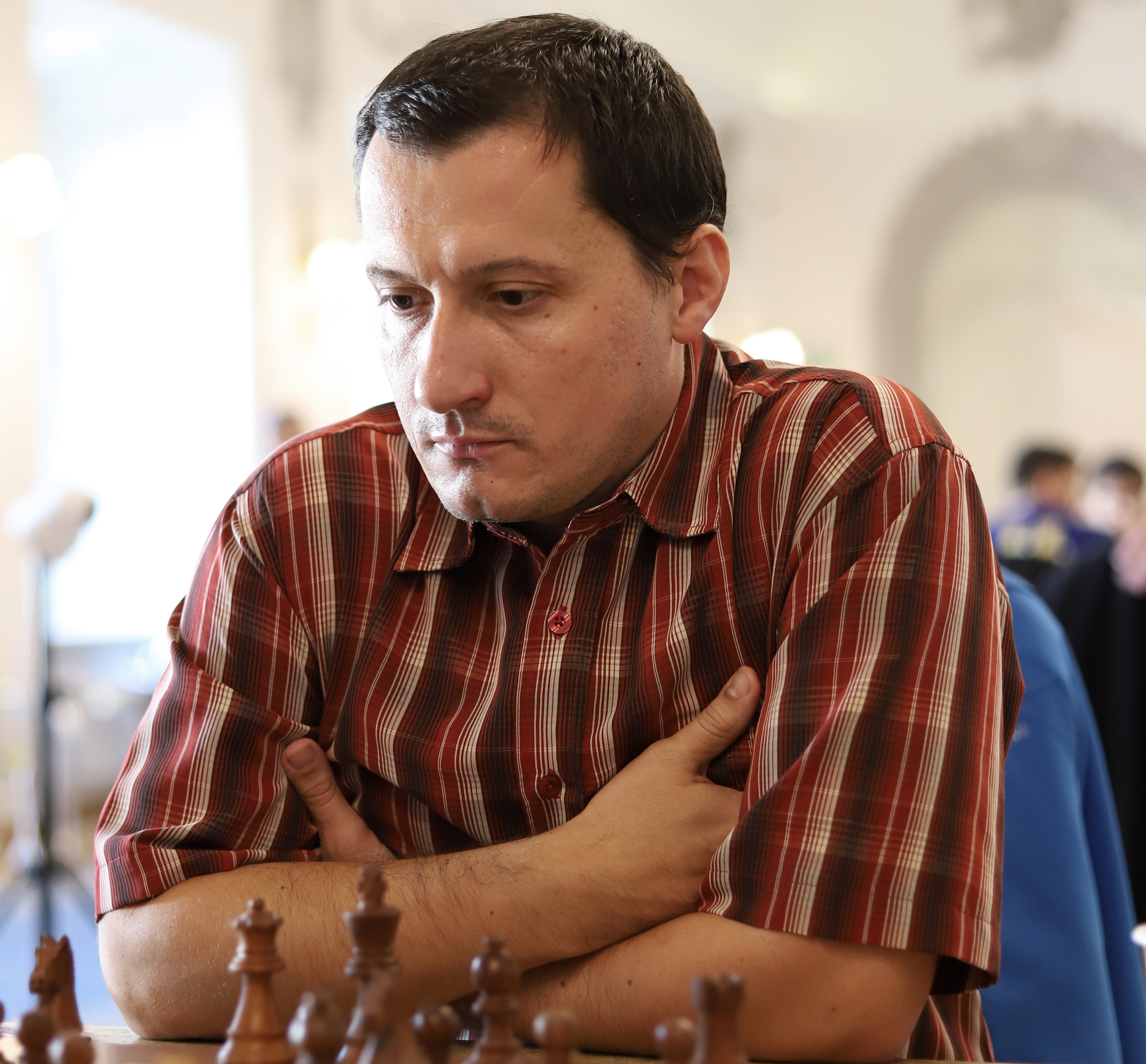
- Berkes in 2021

Personal information
- Born: 8 August 1985 (age 40) Baja, Hungary

Chess career
- Country: Hungary
- Title: Grandmaster (2002)
- FIDE rating: 2612 (July 2026)
- Peak rating: 2706 (September 2011)
- Peak ranking: No. 41 (September 2011)

Ferenc Berkes (born 8 August 1985) is a Hungarian chess grandmaster. He is an eight-time Hungarian Chess Champion, winning in 2004, 2007, 2010, 2012, 2013, 2014, 2016 and 2018.

In 2002, he was World Under 18 Champion.

In 2004 he tied for 4th–16th in the 3rd Aeroflot Open in Moscow.

He took part in the Chess World Cup 2011, but was eliminated in the second round by Zahar Efimenko.

He tied 3rd to 11th place in the 2019 European Individual Championship with Kacper Piorun, David Anton Guijarro, Niclas Huschenbeth, Sergei Movsesian, Liviu-Dieter Nisipeanu, Grigoriy Oparin, Maxim Rodshtein, and Eltaj Safarli.

In the Chess World Cup 2023, Berkes (82nd seed) reached the round of 16 by defeating 18th seed Nikita Vitiugov in the third round and Ruslan Ponomariov in the fourth round.
