= Yu Yangyi =

Chinese chess grandmaster (born 1994)

- Yu at the 2026 Chess Olympiad

Personal information
- Born: 8 June 1994 (age 32) Huangshi, Hubei, China

Chess career
- Country: China
- Title: Grandmaster (2009)
- FIDE rating: 2705 (November 2026)
- Peak rating: 2765 (September 2018)
- Ranking: No. 29 (November 2026)
- Peak ranking: No. 10 (September 2019)

Chinese name
- Simplified Chinese: 余泱漪
- Traditional Chinese: 余泱漪
Transcriptions
Standard Mandarin
- Hanyu Pinyin: Yú Yāngyī
- IPA: [y̌ jáŋí]

Yu Yangyi (Chinese: 余泱漪; born 8 June 1994) is a Chinese chess grandmaster. He qualified for the Grandmaster title at 14 years, 11 months and 23 days old in 2009. He is a three-time Chinese Chess Champion and the 2014 Asian Chess Champion.

Yu also has two gold medals from the Chess Olympiad in 2014 and 2018 as well as two gold medals from the World Team Chess Championship in 2015 and 2017.

Yu has participated in multiple editions of the Chess World Cup with his best performance coming fourth in 2019.

== Personal life ==
Yu Yangyi plays for Beijing chess club in the China Chess League (CCL).

Outside the chess world, Yu studied Sports Economics at Beijing Sports University.

== Tournaments ==
- 24 October–2 November 2003: World Youth Chess Championship (under-10) in Halkidiki, Greece. He scored 8½/11 coming equal second
- 3–14 November 2004: World Youth Chess Championship (Under-10) in Heraklio, Crete, Greece. He scored 9/11 coming equal first with Jules Moussard, Raymond Song and Hou Yifan (the current Women's World Champion).
- February 2007: Aeroflot Open Group C in Moscow. He scored 7.5/9 coming second
- 4–11 August 2007: Scandinavian Chess Tournament at Täby Park Hotel, Stockholm, Sweden. He scored 6½/9 coming 10th place
- February 2008: Aeroflot Open Group B in Moscow. He scored 7.0/9 coming third
- February 2009: Aeroflot Open Group A2 (and Blitz Tournament) in Moscow. He scored 5.5/9 coming 20th
- 12–24 May 2009: Asian Chess Championship in Subic, Philippines. He came 3rd place as he scored 6.0/9 with a performance rating of 2700. By doing so he qualified for his first 2009 World Cup in Khanty-Mansisk, Russia. This was his first GM norm
- 25–31 May 2009: 2nd Subic International Open in Subic Bay Free Port. He scored 6.0/9 (+3=6-0) with a 2653 performance finishing in 9th place This was his second GM norm
- 4 September 2009: 6th Dato Arthur Tan Malaysia Open Chess Championship in Kuala Lumpur. He scored 6½/9
- September 2009: Zhejiang Lishui Xingqiu Open, he came second behind Lê Quang Liêm with 6.5/9.
- October 2009: World Junior Chess Championship in Puerto Madryn, Argentina. He scored 8.5/13 (+7=3-3) with a 2618 performance. He came 7th place on tiebreak
- November 2009: Chess World Cup, Russia, reached the third round after achieving the biggest upset of the first round – winning 1,5:0,5 against 16th seed Sergei Movsesian, and also upsetting Mateusz Bartel in the second round.
- February 2011: Aeroflot Open, Moscow, Russia. Tied for 4th–10th with Rustam Kasimdzhanov, Gata Kamsky, Rauf Mamedov, Ivan Cheparinov, Denis Khismatullin and Maxim Rodshtein.
- May 2011: came first at Danzhou. He scored 7/9 (+5=4-0) with a performance rating of 2880.
- September 2013: Overall winner of the 2013 World Junior Chess Championship. He came first with 11/13 (+9=4-0) with Alexander Ipatov close behind with 10.5/13 (+8=5-0). Due to winning the World Junior Championship, he automatically qualifies for the Chess World Cup 2015 which is a qualification path to the World Chess Championship 2016.
- March 2014: He competed in the Chinese Chess Championship and finished first on tiebreaks with 7/11 (+3=8-0) over his fellow countryman Ding Liren 7/11 (+4=6-1). He scored impressive wins over fellow players Liu Qingnan, Wei Yi and Zeng Chonsheng.
- April 2014: He competed in the Asian Chess Championship and finished overall first 7/9 (+5=4-0) over Ni Hua, Rustam Kasimdzhanov and Adhiban B. With the win, he won $6,000 US.
- December 2014: Yu won the Qatar Masters scoring 7.5/9 (+6=3-0), beating former world champion Vladimir Kramnik and top seed Anish Giri.
- June 2015: Yu won the 50th Capablanca Memorial in Havana, Cuba scoring 7/10 (+5=4-1), beating the top seed Leinier Domínguez twice for a 2860 performance rating.
- December 2015: Yu earned second place in the 2nd edition of the Qatar Masters Open, scoring 7/9 (+5-0=4), defeating Wesley So in the final round but losing to Magnus Carlsen in the tiebreak.
- 14 August 2019: Yu finished second place in the Saint Louis Rapid and Blitz event with a score of 21.5/36. The second place was tied and shared with Ding Liren and Maxime Vachier-Lagrave.
- October 2019: Yu finished fourth in the Chess World Cup 2019
- April 2021: Yu won the fourth edition of the Shenzhen Masters with 12 points, one ahead of Jan-Krzysztof Duda.
- October–November 2021: Yu finished fourth in the FIDE Grand Swiss Tournament 2021.
- February–March 2022: Yu finished 20th in the FIDE Grand Prix 2022 with three points.
- June 2022: Yu won the Summer Chess Classic A tournament in St. Louis, US with a score of 6.5/9, 1.5 points ahead of Grigoriy Oparin and Abhimanyu Mishra.
- November 2022: Yu won the Fall Chess Classic A tournament in St. Louis, US with a score of 6.5/9, half a point ahead of Vidit Gujrathi.
- December 2023: Yu won the Alef Super Stars 2023 tournament in Sharjah. In the same month, he came third place in the World Rapid Chess Championship 2023 with a score of 9/13, behind Carlsen and Vladimir Fedoseev.
- October 2026: Won the Shenzhen Masters 2026 after defeating Ding Liren 4-3 in tiebreaks.
- November 2026: Yu won the Chinese Rapid Championship after defeating Xiao Tong in the tiebreaks.
