= Kacper Piorun =

Polish chess grandmaster (born 1991)

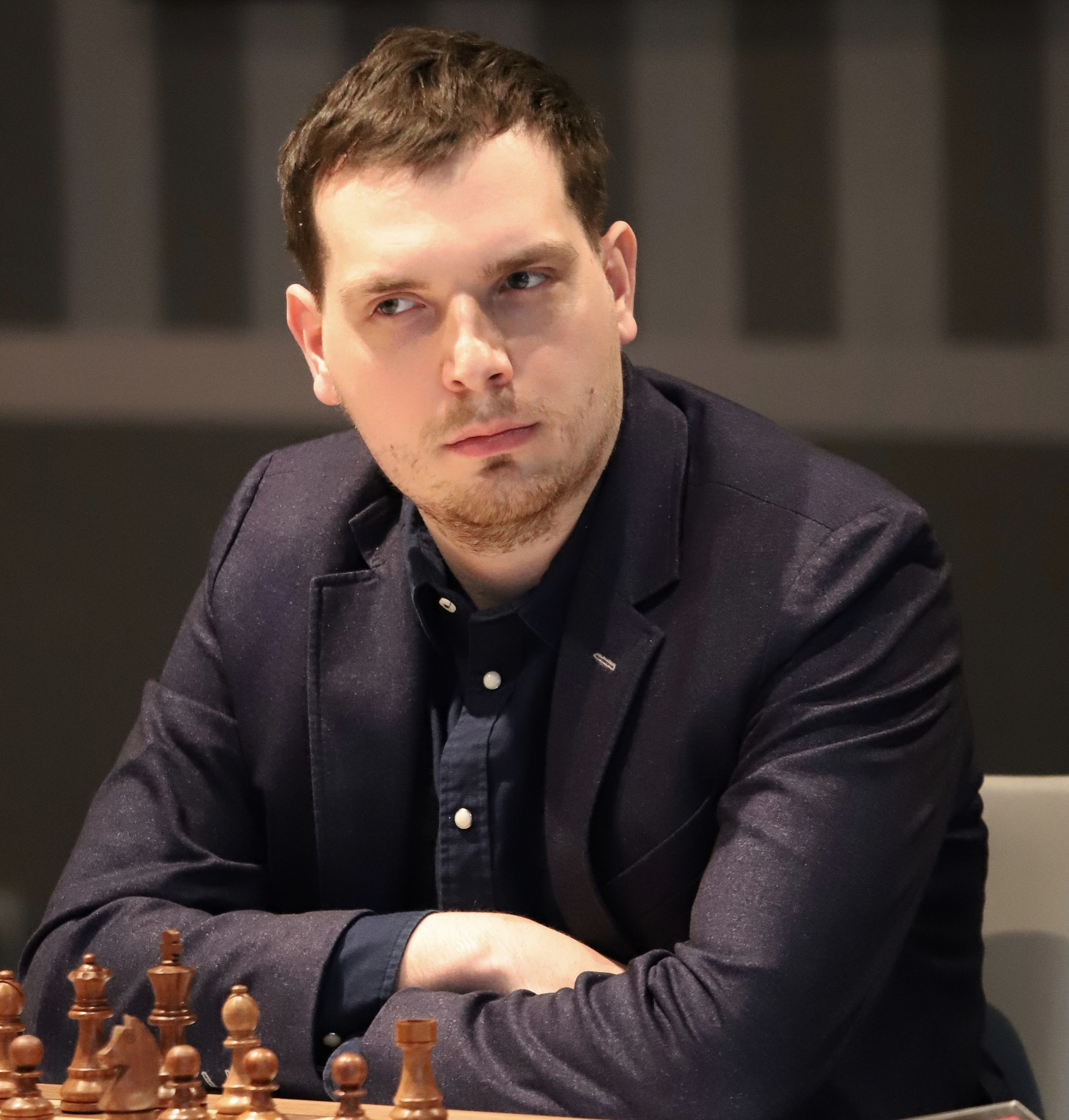
- Piorun in 2021

Personal information
- Born: 24 November 1991 (age 34) Łowicz, Poland

Chess career
- Country: Poland
- Title: Grandmaster (2012); International Solving Grandmaster (2011)
- FIDE rating: 2519 (July 2026)
- Peak rating: 2685 (July 2016)
- Peak ranking: No. 52 (July 2016)

Kacper Piorun (born 24 November 1991) is a Polish chess player who received the FIDE title of Grandmaster (GM) in September 2012. He is a six-time winner of the World Chess Solving Championship, and two-time winner of the Polish Chess Championship.

== Career ==
In 2007, Piorun won the Polish under-16 chess championship in Łeba. In 2009, he finished third in the World Youth Chess Championship. In 2010, he won the Rubinstein Memorial in Polanica-Zdrój. In 2013, he won the Polish Blitz Chess Championship in Bydgoszcz. In 2015, Piorun took clear first place at the 17th Open of Sants, Hostafrancs & La Bordeta in Barcelona and at the 19th Open International Bavarian Chess Championship in Bad Wiessee. He has also competed successfully in several Polish Team Chess Championships. He won the Polish chess championship in 2017 and in 2020.

Piorun played for Poland in the European U18 Team Chess Championship in 2008, winning two gold medals (team and individual on board 3), and 2009, winning the team silver. He took part in the 2013 European Team Chess Championship in Warsaw, playing on board 4 for Poland's second team.

Piorun is an excellent chess problem solver. In 2011, he won the individual World Chess Solving Championship in Jesi and became an International Solving Grandmaster as a result. Piorun won the world individual title also in 2014 in Bern, 2015 in Ostróda and 2016 in Belgrade. He won team gold with Poland at the World Chess Solving Championship in Jesi 2011, Kobe 2012, Batumi 2013, Bern 2014, Ostróda 2015, Belgrade 2016 and Dresden 2017 events.

During the 2018 Chess Olympiad in Batumi, he defeated the thirteenth best player in the world, Hikaru Nakamura, and claimed fourth place overall with the Polish team. At the 2022 Chess Olympiad he was part of the Polish team, that came at place 9 in the final results.

He tied for 3rd to 11th place in the 2019 European Individual Championship with David Anton Guijarro, Ferenc Berkes, Niclas Huschenbeth, Sergei Movsesian, Liviu-Dieter Nisipeanu, Grigoriy Oparin, Maxim Rodshtein, and Eltaj Safarli.

In May 2024, in Rzeszów he ranked in 6th place in Polish Chess Championship.
