= Sergio Duran Vega =

Costa Rican chess player

Personal information
- Born: December 19, 1993 (age 32)

Chess career
- Country: Costa Rica
- Title: International Master (2017)
- Peak rating: 2408 (February 2017)

Sergio Duran Vega (born 1993) is a Costa Rican chess player. He was awarded the title International Master by FIDE in 2017.

== Career ==
Sergio Duran Vega represented Costa Rica at the 39th Chess Olympiad in 2010 and the 41st Chess Olympiad in 2014.

He was one of four players ending on 8.5 out of 10 at the 2019 American Continental Championship, qualifying for the Chess World Cup 2019, where he was defeated by fourth seed Wesley So in the first round.
