= Alder Escobar Forero =

Colombian chess grandmaster (born 1977)

Personal information
- Born: March 11, 1977 (age 49)

Chess career
- Country: Colombia
- Title: Grandmaster (2014)
- FIDE rating: 2414 (July 2026)
- Peak rating: 2524 (November 2015)

Alder Escobar Forero (born 1977) is a Colombian chess player. He was awarded the title of Grandmaster by FIDE in 2014.

== Career ==
Escobar Forero has represented Colombia in four Chess Olympiads: 2006, 2008, 2010 and 2012. He played in the Chess World Cup 2019, where he was defeated by Leinier Domínguez in the first round.

In January 2018, Escobar Forero tied for third place, with a score of 5.0/9, with Praggnanandhaa and IM Denys Shmelov in the Charlotte Chess Center's Winter 2018 GM Norm Invitational held in Charlotte, North Carolina.
