= Vladimir Fedoseev =

Russian-Slovenian chess grandmaster (born 1995)

- Fedoseev in 2025

Personal information
- Born: Vladimir Vasilyevich Fedoseev; 16 February 1995 (age 31) Saint Petersburg, Russia

Chess career
- Country: Russia (until May 2022); FIDE (May 2022 - July 2023) (Note: Several Russian players officially switched federations in response to the 2022 Russian invasion of Ukraine.); Slovenia (since July 2023)
- Title: Grandmaster (2011)
- FIDE rating: 2691 (September 2026)
- Peak rating: 2739 (March 2025)
- Ranking: No. 37 (September 2026)
- Peak ranking: No. 16 (March 2025)

Vladimir Vasilyevich Fedoseev (Russian: Влади́мир Васи́льевич Федосе́ев; born 16 February 1995) is a Russian chess grandmaster playing for Slovenia. He won the European Rapid and Chess960 championships in 2024. He competed in the Chess World Cup in 2015, 2017, 2021, 2023 and 2025.

== Career ==
Fedoseev tied for second place in the Chigorin Memorial 2010 tournament, finishing seventh on tiebreak. In 2011, Fedoseev won the under 18 section of the Russian Youth Championships and finished runner-up in the same division at the World Youth Chess Championship. In the same year, he played for the gold medal-winning Russian team in the World Youth U-16 Chess Olympiad in Kocaeli, Turkey.

In 2012, Fedoseev tied for first place with Alexei Shirov in the Paul Keres Memorial rapid tournament in Tallinn, finishing second after playoffs. In 2013, in Budva, Montenegro, he won the under-18 division of the European Youth Chess Championship, and also won the blitz and rapid events in the under-18 category.

Fedoseev won the bronze medal at the 2014 European Individual Chess Championship in Yerevan, therefore qualifying for the 2015 FIDE World Cup. Later that year, he finished third in the "Lake Sevan" round-robin tournament in Martuni, Armenia and in the World Junior Chess Championship. In December 2014, he took part in the "Nutcracker Match of the Generations", a match between two teams, Princes (made up of Vladislav Artemiev, Daniil Dubov, Fedoseev, and Grigoriy Oparin) and Kings (Alexei Dreev, Peter Leko, Alexander Morozevich, and Alexei Shirov), held in Moscow with the Scheveningen system. Fedoseev was the top scorer of the event with 11/16 points.

In January 2015, he won the Vladimir Dvorkovich Memorial in Taganrog. In April of that year, he tied for first place in the Dubai Open, placing third on tiebreak; he also won the blitz tournament from the event. In 2016 Fedoseev shared first place in the Grenke Chess Open in Karlsruhe, Germany with Matthias Bluebaum, Nikita Vitiugov, Miloš Perunović, Ni Hua, and Francisco Vallejo Pons, taking second place on tiebreak.

In March 2017 Fedoseev came first in the Aeroflot Open. This victory earned him an invitation to the Dortmund Sparkassen Chess Meeting, held in July of the same year. In this event he won against Vladimir Kramnik in the opening round and eventually finished second, edging out Maxime Vachier-Lagrave on tiebreak. In June 2017, Fedoseev tied for first place with Maxim Matlakov and Baadur Jobava in the European Individual Championship in Minsk and took the bronze medal on tiebreak. Later in the same month, Fedoseev was part of the Russian team which won the silver medal in the World Team Chess Championship in Khanty-Mansiysk. In September, he reached the quarterfinals of the World Cup in Tbilisi, after knocking out Yusnel Bacallao Alonso, Ernesto Inarkiev, Hikaru Nakamura and Maxim Rodshtein. Fedoseev was then eliminated from the competition by Wesley So. Two months later, Fedoseev won the Urii Eliseev Memorial in Moscow with a score of 4½/5 points. In December he shared 3rd-4th places with Daniil Dubov in the Russian Championship Superfinal in St. Petersburg, finishing fourth on tiebreak, and won the silver medal in the World Rapid Chess Championship in Riyadh, after losing the playoff to Viswanathan Anand.

Through February and March 2022, Fedoseev played in the FIDE Grand Prix 2022. In the first leg, he placed third in Pool B with a 3/6 result. In the second leg, he tied for third with Alexei Shirov in Pool C with a result of 2.5/6, finishing 19th in the standings with three points.

On the first day of the Grand Prix, three days after the Russian invasion of Ukraine, Fedoseev requested to play under the FIDE flag instead of the Russian Chess Federation flag, saying that playing under the latter was "the same as loyalty for the country." While Fedoseev indicated that he had a personal reason for not signing an open letter to Vladimir Putin calling for an end to the war by Russian titled players, he said that he could no longer live in a country in which a majority supported the war, and did not return to Russia after the tournament. He and his second, GM Daniil Yuffa, rented an apartment in Valencia, Spain, where fellow Russian GM Kirill Alekseenko joined them. In July 2023, he completed his transfer to the chess federation of Slovenia, where he had also obtained a residence, becoming the country's highest rated player.

In December 2023, Fedoseev competed at World Rapid and Blitz Championships 2023 in Samarkand, Uzbekistan. He won the silver medal in the rapid section, scoring 9.5/13, only finishing behind the highest seed, Magnus Carlsen.

In September 2024, Fedoseev defeated world number one Magnus Carlsen in 45th Chess Olympiad. In December 2024, he won the European Rapid and Chess960 championships. In January 2025, Fedoseev qualified to the first leg of Freestyle Chess Grand Slam Tour by winning the online qualifier. He defeated Leinier Domínguez, Jan-Krzysztof Duda, Ian Nepomniachtchi, and Javokhir Sindarov in the knockout phase of the qualifier. He won Grand Chess Tour: Superbet Poland Rapid & Blitz 2025 event.
