= Shaun Press =

Papua New Guinean chess player (born 1966)

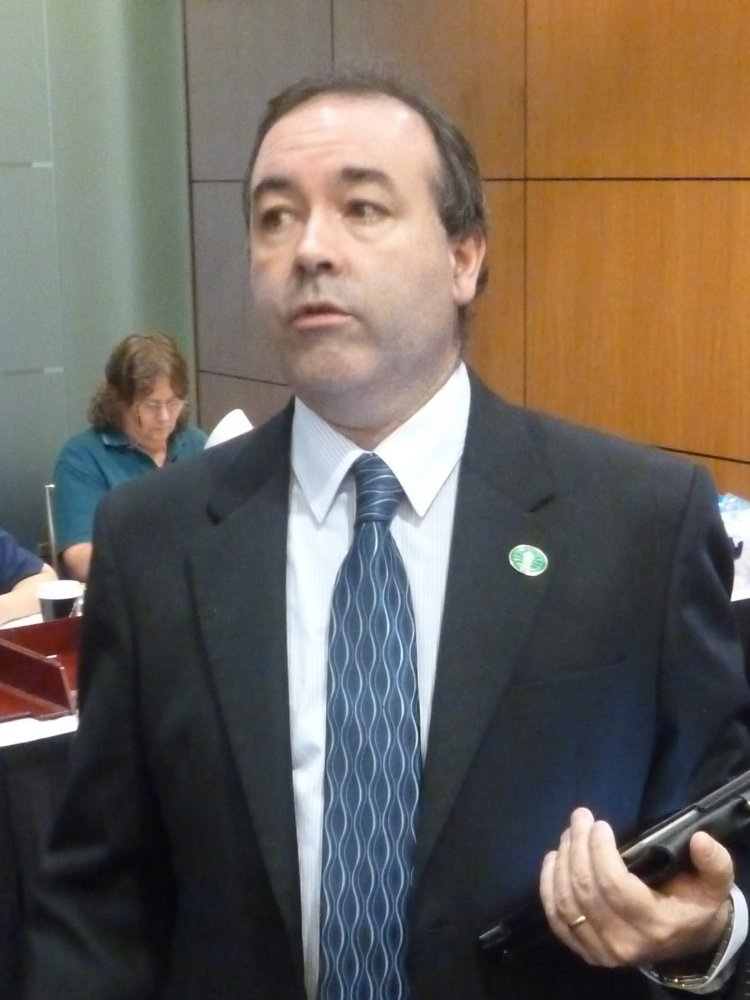
- Shaun Press at the 2013 Doeberl Cup

Personal information
- Born: 9 October 1966 (age 59) Port Moresby, Papua New Guinea

Chess career
- Country: Papua New Guinea
- Title: FIDE Master (2012)
- FIDE rating: 1946 (March 2021)
- Peak rating: 2110 (January 2005)

Shaun Press (born 9 October 1966) is a Papua New Guinean chess player and official. He holds the titles of FIDE Master (FM) and International Arbiter (IA).

== Chess career ==
Born in Port Moresby, Press represented Papua New Guinea in seven Chess Olympiads from 2000 to 2012. His best result was scoring 6/9 points, and finishing 13th on board 3, at the 35th Chess Olympiad in Bled 2002. Press was awarded the title of FIDE Master in 2012 for this result. He refused to submit to doping control at the 36th Chess Olympiad in Calvia 2004, and his points were subtracted from the Papua New Guinea team's score.

Press won the 2009 Solomon Islands International with a score of 7½/9 points. He was awarded the title of International Arbiter by FIDE in 2010. Press finished second in the Oceania zonal tournament 2019 in Guam and qualified for the FIDE World Cup 2019.

Press is currently the Magazine Editor of the Correspondence Chess League of Australia (CCLA). He is now serving as the Secretary of the Qualifications Commission and current Zonal President of Oceania.
