= Daniel Anwuli =

Nigerian chess player (born 1997)

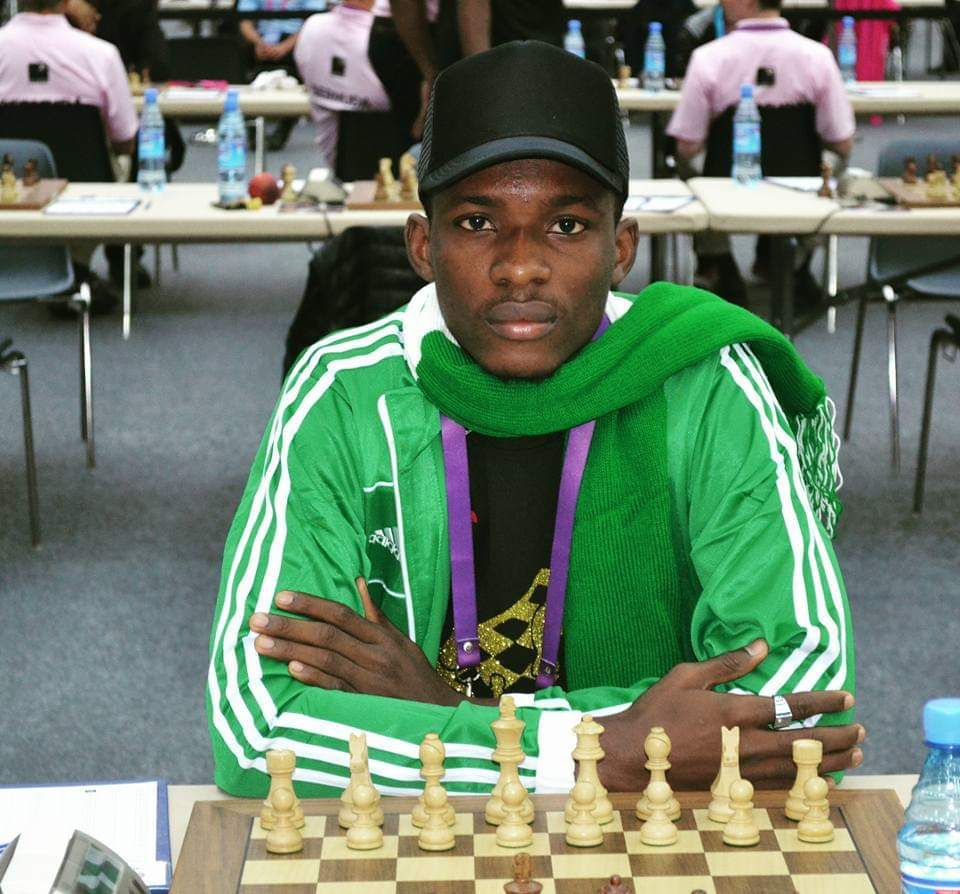
- Anwuli at the World chess Olympiad in Baku, Azerbaijan 2016

Personal information
- Born: Daniel Anwuli Chukwuebuka; 2 May 1997 (age 29)

Chess career
- Country: Nigeria
- Title: International Master (2019)
- Peak rating: 2368 (May 2016)

Daniel Anwuli (born 2 May 1997) is a Nigerian chess player. He was awarded the title International Master by FIDE in 2019.

Daniel Anwuli won the 2019 West Africa Chess Championship., qualifying for the Chess World Cup 2019, where he was defeated by Maxime Vachier-Lagrave in the first round. He is the 2020 Nigeria national chess champion.

Anwuli represented Nigeria at the 42nd Chess Olympiad in Baku, Azerbaijan 2016 and at the 43rd Chess Olympiad, Georgia 2018.
