= Aleksandr Rakhmanov =

Russian chess grandmaster (born 1989)

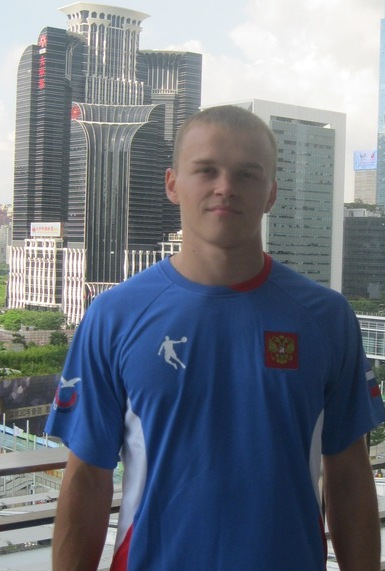
- Aleksandr Rakhmanov, 2011

Personal information
- Born: 28 August 1989 (age 36) Cherepovets, Russian SFSR, Soviet Union

Chess career
- Country: Russia (until 2023); FIDE (since 2023)
- Title: Grandmaster (2007)
- FIDE rating: 2590 (July 2026)
- Peak rating: 2676 (May 2017)
- Peak ranking: No. 69 (June 2017)

Aleksandr Rakhmanov (Russian: Александр Рахманов; born 28 August 1989) is a Russian chess grandmaster.

== Chess career ==
Born in 1989, Rakhmanov earned his international master title in 2006 and his grandmaster title in 2007. In March 2018, he competed in the European Individual Chess Championship. He placed 140th, scoring 5½/11 (+5–5=1). The following year, he competed again in the European Individual Chess Championship. He placed 21st with 7½/11 (+4–0=7) and qualified for the Chess World Cup 2019.
