= Kirill Alekseenko =

Russian-Austrian chess grandmaster (born 1997)

- Alekseenko in 2026

Personal information
- Born: Kirill Alexeyevich Alekseenko; 22 June 1997 (age 29) Vyborg, Russia

Chess career
- Country: Russia (until May 2022); FIDE (May 2022–July 2023); Austria (since July 2023) (Note: Several Russian players officially switched federations in response to the 2022 Russian invasion of Ukraine.)
- Title: Grandmaster (2015)
- FIDE rating: 2637 (November 2026)
- Peak rating: 2715 (November 2019)
- Ranking: No. 82 (November 2026)
- Peak ranking: No. 29 (November 2021)

Kirill Alexeyevich Alekseenko (Russian: Кирилл Алексеевич Алексеенко; born 22 June 1997) is a Russian chess grandmaster who currently plays for Austria.

== Personal life ==
Alekseenko was born in Vyborg, and moved to Saint Petersburg as a child. His father was a soldier and his mother was a teacher. As of 2019, Alekseenko is a student at Peter the Great St. Petersburg Polytechnic University.

Together with 43 other Russian elite chess players, Alekseenko signed an open letter to Russian president Vladimir Putin, protesting against the 2022 Russian invasion of Ukraine and expressing solidarity with the Ukrainian people. After playing under the neutral FIDE flag, in July 2023 he transferred to the Austrian Chess Federation.

== Chess career ==
=== Early career ===
Alekseenko's grandfather was a chess enthusiast and taught Alekseenko the rules of the game when he was four years old. Aside from his grandfather, no one in his family played chess. At the age of seven, Alekseenko played his first tournament, the St. Petersburg U8 Championship. At the European Youth Chess Championship, he was the U10 champion in 2007, and the U16 champion in 2013. At the World U14 Chess Championship, Alekseenko won bronze in 2010, and gold in 2011. He then won silver and bronze in 2012 and 2013, respectively, at the World U16 Chess Championship.

Alekseenko achieved the necessary norms for the grandmaster title in 2012, but did not reach a FIDE rating of 2500 necessary for the granting of the title until 2015. He competed in the 2015 World U18 Chess Championship held in Greece from 24 October to 6 November, placing second with 8½/11 (+8–2=1), one point behind winner Masoud Mosadeghpour. Alekseenko won the Chigorin Memorial in 2015. He repeated the success in 2016 and 2017.

=== 2018–2019 ===
Alekseenko won the 2017/18 Rilton Cup. In February 2018, he participated in the Aeroflot Open. He finished 13th out of 92, scoring 5½/9 (+4–2=3). In March, Alekseenko competed in the European Individual Chess Championship. He placed 34th, scoring 7/11 (+6–3=2). He competed in the European Championship again in 2019, placing 63rd with 6½/11 (+5–3=3).

Although he failed to qualify for the Chess World Cup 2019 through European Championship placement, Alekseenko was chosen as a wildcard nominee by the organiser of the tournament. He defeated Nguyễn Ngọc Trường Sơn and Johan-Sebastian Christiansen in rounds one and two, then eliminated the 17th-seed Pentala Harikrishna in the third round. He faced the 1st-seed Ding Liren in the fourth round. Alekseenko drew both of the classical games but lost in the rapid tiebreaks.

At the 2019 European Team Chess Championship held in Batumi from 24 October to 2 November, Alekseenko represented Russia on the third board. He scored 4½/8 (+2–1=5) as Russia won gold. Alekseenko defeated Kacper Piorun of Poland in the final round, which proved decisive to Russia's first-place finish.

In December 2019, he competed in the World Rapid and Blitz Championships. He placed 57th in the rapid with 8½/15 (+6–4=5), and 71st in the blitz with 11½/21 (+8–6=7).

=== 2020–2021 Candidates ===
At the FIDE Grand Swiss Tournament 2019 held in October on the Isle of Man, Alekseenko took third place on tie breaks with 7½/11 (+4–0=7), half a point behind winner Wang Hao and runner-up Fabiano Caruana. Alekseenko thus became eligible to be chosen as the wildcard nominee for the Candidates Tournament 2020 as the next-highest placed finisher at the Grand Swiss, apart from Caruana (who had already qualified for the Candidates).

On 23 December 2019, Alekseenko was announced as the wildcard nominee for the Candidates Tournament, originally scheduled to be held in Yekaterinburg from 17 March to 3 April 2020. Peter Svidler acted as Alekseenko's second during that tournament. On 26 March, due to the COVID-19 pandemic, the tournament was suspended. With seven rounds played, Alekseenko was tied for last with Ding on a score of 2½/7. After the resumption of the Candidates Tournament 2020–21 in April 2021, Alekseenko returned to Yekaterinburg and played the final seven games. He finished in seventh place with 5½/14.
