= Maxim Matlakov =

Russian chess grandmaster (born 1991)

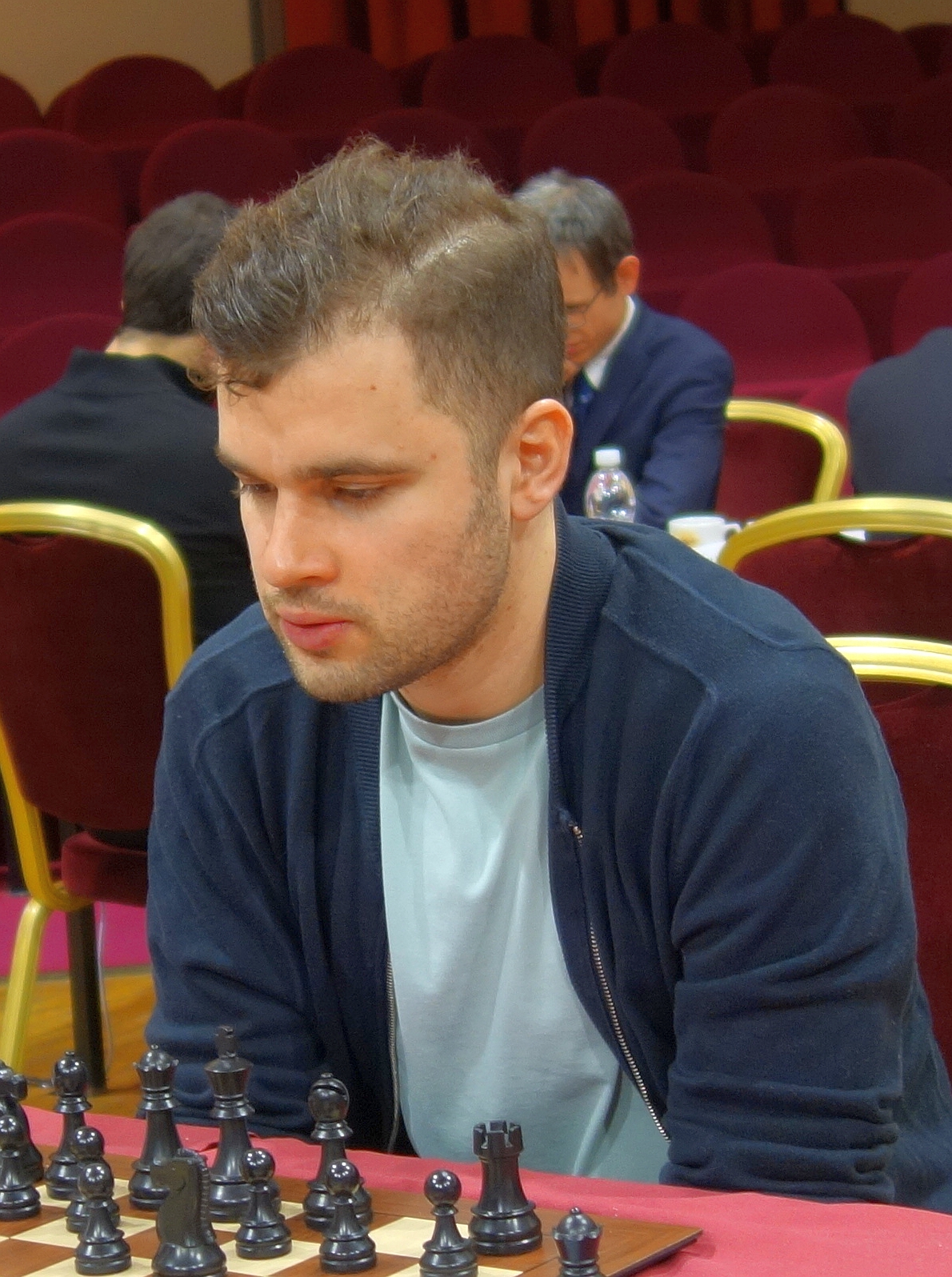
- Matlakov in 2023

Personal information
- Born: Maxim Sergeevich Matlakov; 5 March 1991 (age 35) Leningrad, Russian SFSR, Soviet Union

Chess career
- Country: Russia (until 2022); FIDE (since 2022)
- Title: Grandmaster (2010)
- FIDE rating: 2599 (July 2026)
- Peak rating: 2738 (November 2017)
- Peak ranking: No. 23 (November 2017)

Maxim Sergeevich Matlakov (Максим Сергеевич Матлаков; born 5 March 1991) is a Russian chess grandmaster. He won the European Individual Chess Championship in 2017.

He acted as a second for Peter Svidler in the Candidates Tournaments of 2013, 2014 and 2016.

Together with 43 other Russian elite chess players, Matlakov signed an open letter to Russian president Vladimir Putin, protesting against the 2022 Russian invasion of Ukraine and expressing solidarity with the Ukrainian people.

== Chess career ==
Matlakov won three medals at the World Youth Chess Championships: two bronze, in the Under 12 section in 2003 and Under 14 in 2005, and a gold, in the Under 18 in 2009. Also in 2009, he won the Saint Petersburg Chess Championship and the Aivars Gipslis Memorial. Matlakov won the Russian Junior (U20) Championship of 2011.

He tied for second, finishing sixth on tiebreak, at the 13th European Individual Chess Championship in 2012 with a score of 8/11 points and qualified for the Chess World Cup 2013. He defeated Dutch GM Jan Smeets in the first round and was eliminated by Azerbaijani GM Shakhriyar Mamedyarov in the second round tiebreaker. In 2013 Matlakov tied for first in the Chigorin Memorial in Saint Petersburg, placing third on tiebreak, behind Pavel Eljanov and Dmitry Kokarev respectively.

In February 2014, he was joint winner with Alexander Moiseenko of the Moscow Open. In July 2014, he tied for second with Parimarjan Negi, Gawain Jones and Maxim Rodshtein at the Politiken Cup in Helsingør, placing third on countback. Matlakov won the blitz event from the tournament. At the Chess World Cup 2015 he was knocked out in the first round by Gadir Guseinov after losing the first set of rapid tiebreakers.

In April 2017, he finished tied for first with Nikita Vitiugov, Étienne Bacrot and Zdenko Kožul in the Grenke Chess Open in Karlsruhe, Germany. Matlakov took second place on tiebreak score. In June, he won the European Individual Championship in Minsk edging out Baadur Jobava and Vladimir Fedoseev on tiebreak, after all three players scored 8½/11 points.

=== Team competitions ===
Matlakov won individual silver medal playing board 5 for Saint Petersburg in the 2013 European Club Cup. Two years later, in the same event he won team bronze medal with St. Petersburg's team "Mednyi Vsadnik". In 2017, Matlakov played for team Russia, which won the silver medal in the World Team Chess Championship in Khanty-Mansiysk.
