= Alan Pichot =

Argentine-Spanish chess grandmaster (born 1998)

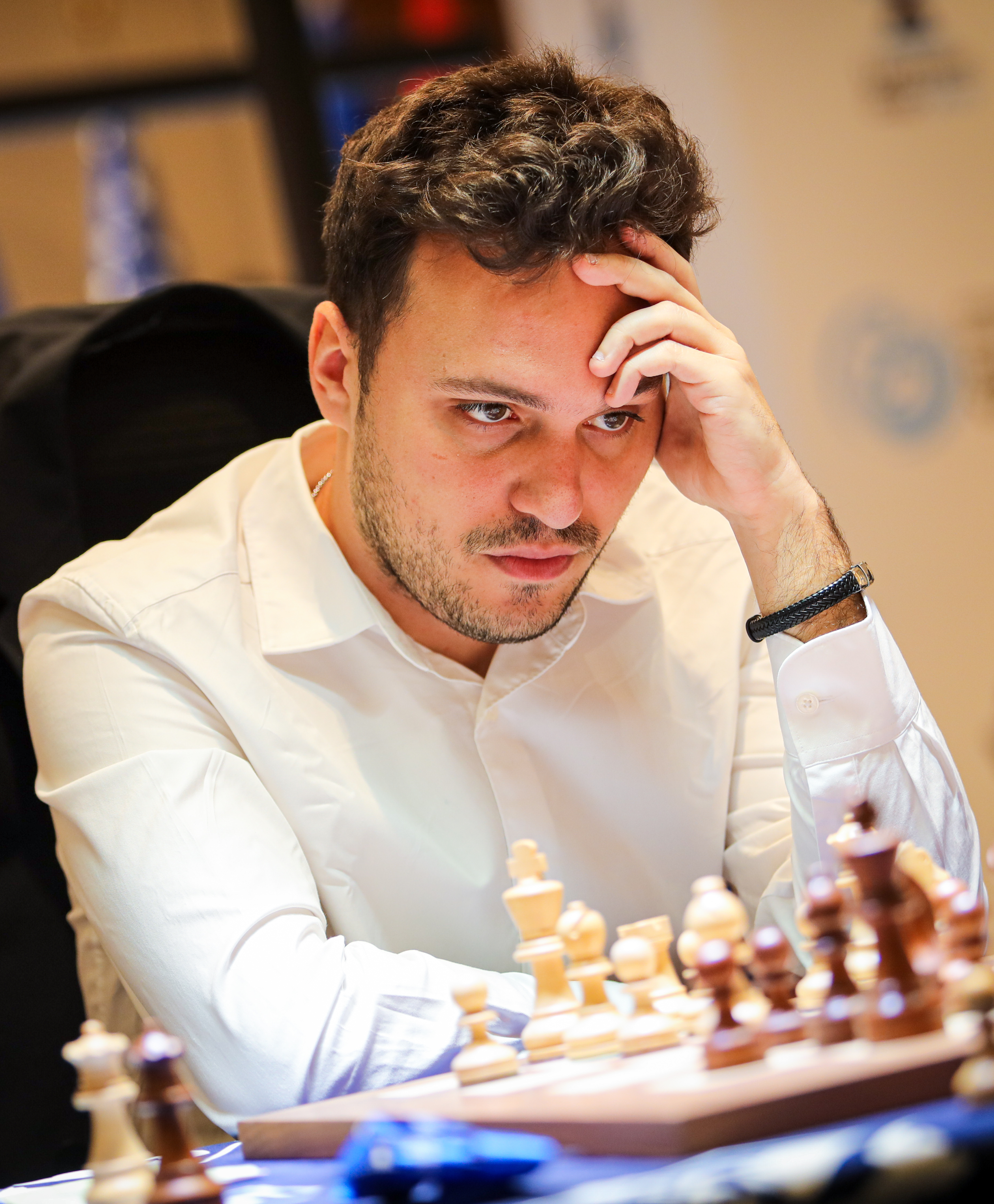
- Pichot in 2026

Personal information
- Born: 13 August 1998 (age 28) Buenos Aires, Argentina

Chess career
- Country: Argentina (until 2023); Spain (since 2023)
- Title: Grandmaster (2016)
- FIDE rating: 2562 (August 2026)
- Peak rating: 2652 (May 2022)
- Peak ranking: No. 85 (November 2024)

Alan Pichot (born 13 August 1998) is an Argentine chess player who represents Spain. He was awarded the title of Grandmaster by FIDE in 2016.

== Chess career ==
Pichot was Argentine champion at the U10, U12, U14 and U18 levels, achieving the latter victory at the age of 12. He became the Pan American under 10 champion in 2008 and as a result, he was awarded the title of FIDE Master. In 2014, he won the U16 section of the World Youth Chess Championships with a score of 9/11 points (+9–2=0), half a point ahead of the rest of the field. He earned the grandmaster title in 2016, aged 17.

In July 2019, Pichot placed fifth in the American Continental Chess Championship with a score of 8/11 (+6–1=4), thus qualifying for the FIDE World Cup 2019.

In 2022, Pichot won the Magistral 50 Aniversario Torre Blanca tournament in Buenos Aires with a score of 8/9 (+7–0=2)

Pichot has represented Argentina at the Chess Olympiad since 2016. He was on the reserve board at the 42nd Chess Olympiad, scoring 5½/8 (+3–0=5). He played on fourth board at the 43rd Chess Olympiad, and scored 5½/9 (+4–2=3).

In August 2023, Pichot announced his decision to transfer from the Argentinian chess federation to represent the Spanish chess federation, citing a lack of financial support as his motivation.

In August 2026, Pichot won the Spanish Chess Championship in Linares with a score of 7½/9 (+6–0=3).
