= Daniil Yuffa =

Russian-Spanish chess grandmaster (born 1997)

- Yuffa in 2026

Personal information
- Born: Daniil Aleksandrovich Yuffa; 25 February 1997 (age 29) Tyumen, Russia

Chess career
- Country: Russia (until 2021); Spain (since 2021)
- Title: Grandmaster (2016)
- FIDE rating: 2576 (November 2026)
- Peak rating: 2657 (June 2025)
- Peak ranking: No. 67 (June 2025)

Daniil Aleksandrovich Yuffa (Russian: Даниил Александрович Юффа; born 25 February 1997) is a Russian-Spanish chess grandmaster.

Together with 43 other Russian chess players, Yuffa signed an open letter to Russian president Vladimir Putin, protesting against the 2022 Russian invasion of Ukraine and expressing solidarity with the Ukrainian people.

== Chess career ==
Born in 1997, Yuffa earned his grandmaster title in 2016.

In September 2017, Yuffa appeared on the Russia-1 talent show "Amazing People", playing thirty blindfold simultaneous games while performing classical music pieces on the piano.

In February 2018, he participated in the Aeroflot Open. He finished 41 out of 92, scoring 4½/9 (+2–2=5). In March 2018, he competed in the European Individual Chess Championship. He placed thirteenth, scoring 7½/11 (+5–1=5).

In 2019, at the Chess World Cup 2019, as the 106th seed, Yuffa upset 23rd seed David Navara in the first round and then beat 42nd seed Luke McShane in the second round before losing to 10th seed Teimour Radjabov in the third round.

In 2021, Yuffa won the Roquetas de Mar Festival with a score of 7.5/9. Since October 2021 he represents the Spanish Chess Federation.
