= Alexandr Predke =

Russian-Serbian chess grandmaster (born 1994)

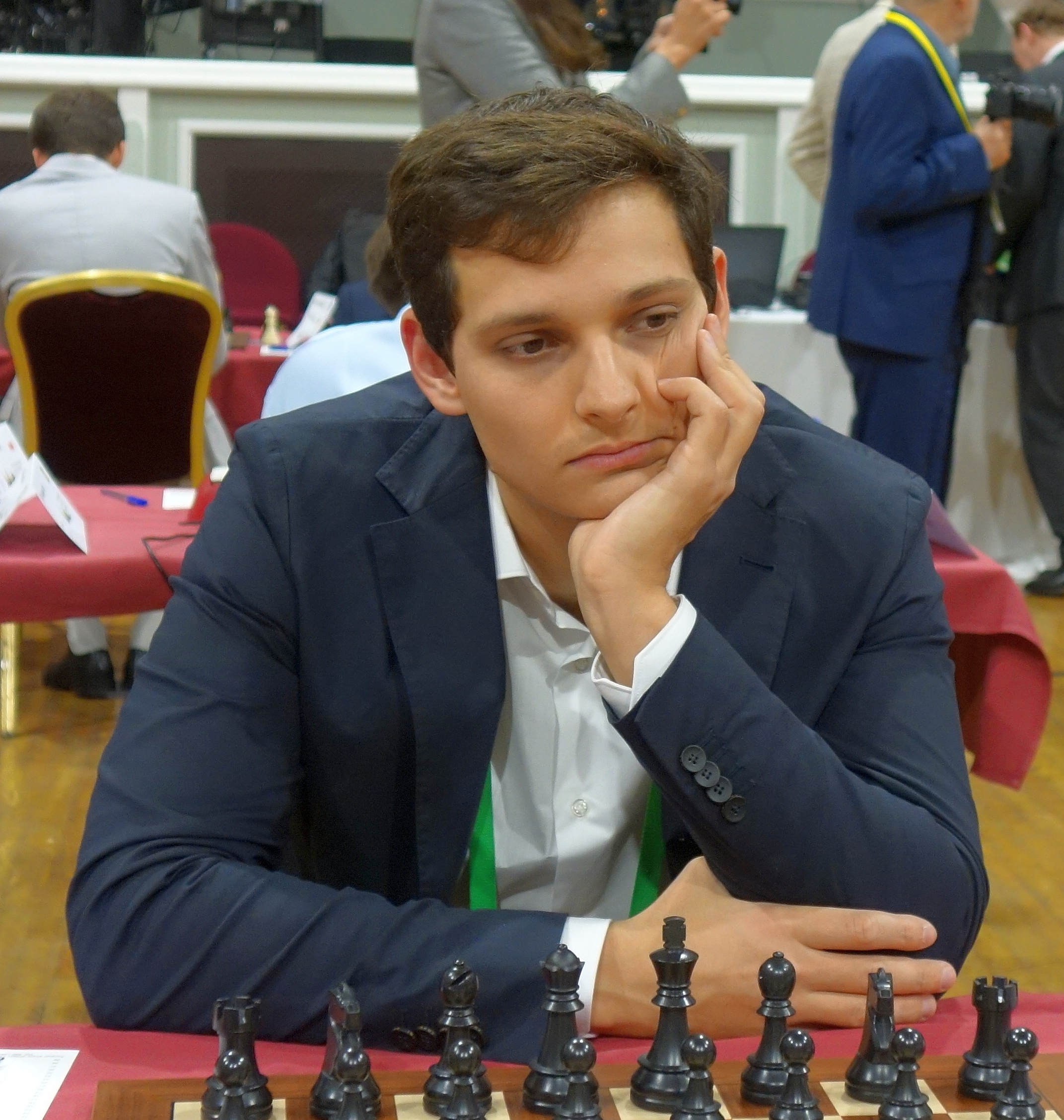

Personal information
- Born: 5 January 1994 (age 32) Dimitrovgrad, Russia

Chess career
- Country: Russia (until May 2022); FIDE (2022) (Note: Several Russian players' officially switched federations in response to the 2022 Russian invasion of Ukraine.); Serbia (since March 2023)
- Title: Grandmaster (2016)
- FIDE rating: 2603 (July 2026)
- Peak rating: 2696 (November 2020)
- Peak ranking: No. 40 (November 2020)

Alexandr Aleksandrovich Predke (Russian: Александр Александрович Предке, Serbian Cyrillic: Александар Александрович Предке; born 5 January 1994) is a Russian chess grandmaster playing for Serbia.

== Biography ==
Predke started playing chess at the age of seven. He is an alumnus of the Tolyatti chess school. In 2010, he won the Russian Youth Chess Championship in the U16 age group. In 2014, he was third in the Russian Junior Championship in the U20 age group. In 2017, in Samara he was second in the Lev Polugaevsky memorial. In August 2018, he finished third in the Riga Technical University Open "A" tournament.

In 2016, he was awarded the FIDE International Grandmaster (GM) title.
