= Dmitrij Kollars =

German chess grandmaster (born 1999)

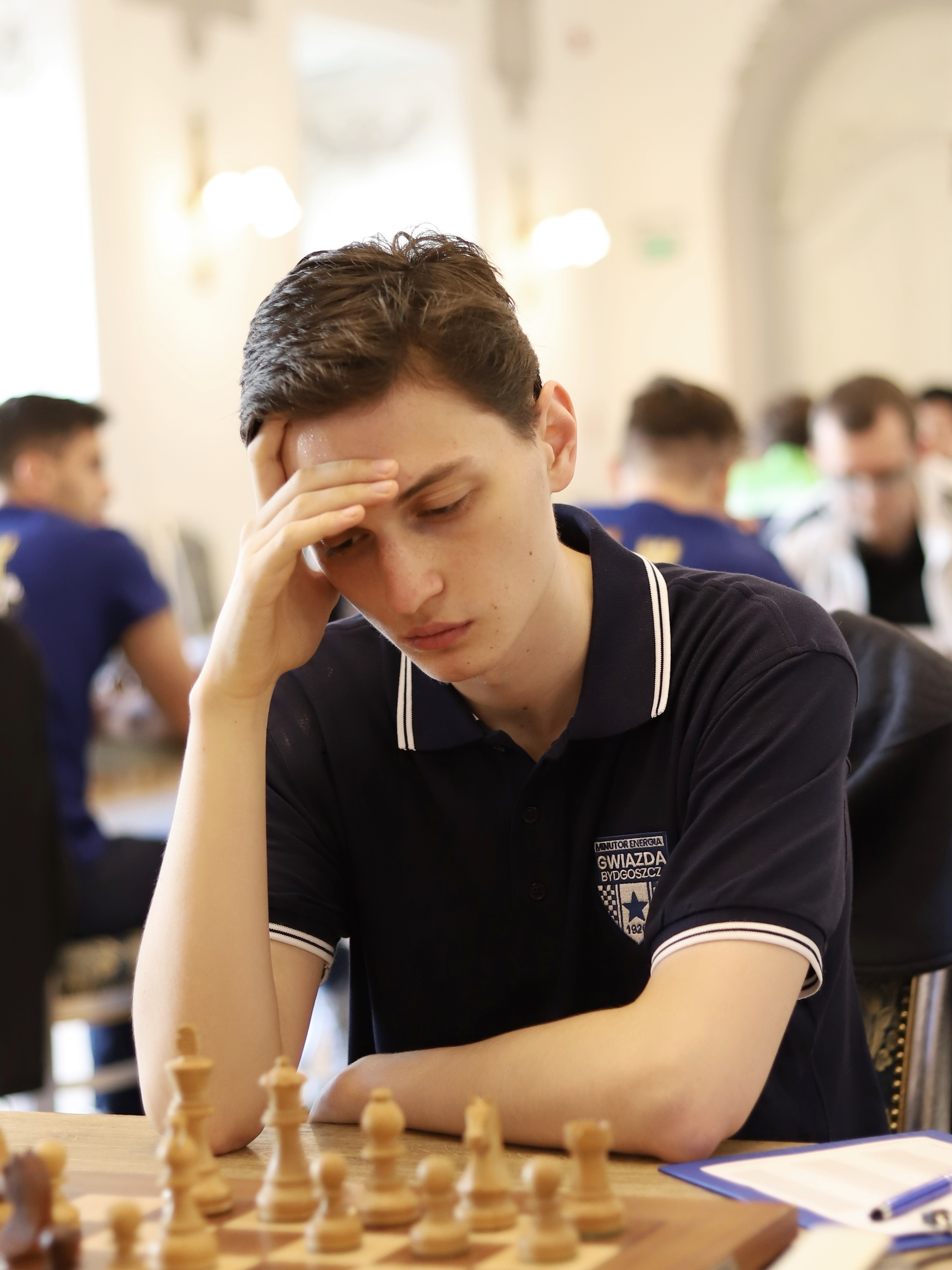
- Dmitrij Kollars, 2021

Personal information
- Born: 13 August 1999 (age 26) Bremen, Germany

Chess career
- Country: Germany
- Title: Grandmaster (2017)
- FIDE rating: 2634 (July 2026)
- Peak rating: 2659 (September 2024)
- Ranking: No. 93 (July 2026)
- Peak ranking: No. 69 (September 2024)

Dmitrij Kollars (born 13 August 1999) is a German chess grandmaster.

== Chess career ==
Kollars placed fourth in the 2011 German U12 Chess Championship. He achieved two top 20 finishes at the 2012 and 2013 German U14 Chess Championships before achieving second place in the 2014 German U16 Chess Championship. By doing so he qualified for his first participation in World Youth Chess Championship. He also achieved second and third-place finishes at the German School Chess Championship in 2013 and 2014, respectively, and placed second in the 15. Bad Harzburger Open.

He secured his first international master (IM) norm at the 2014 German Chess Championship, finishing eighth with a score of 5½/9. In 2015, he won the German U16 Chess Championship, earned his IM title, after attaining the remaining norms at the Nazari Chessfestival and the VMCG-Schachfestival, and won the Schlosspark Open. In 2016 he secured his first grandmaster (GM) norm by winning a GM tournament in Jūrmala, and finished fourth at the World U16 Chess Championship. In 2017, Kollars earned two more GM norms and was awarded his GM title.
