= Miguel Santos Ruiz =

Spanish chess grandmaster (born 1999)

Personal information
- Born: October 4, 1999 (age 26) Utrera, Sevilla, Spain

Chess career
- Country: Spain
- Title: Grandmaster (2019)
- FIDE rating: 2604 (July 2026)
- Peak rating: 2605 (September 2021)

YouTube information
- Channel: @ajedrezconmiguelito
- Years active: 2022–present
- Genre: Online chess
- Subscribers: 45 thousand
- Views: 7 million

Miguel Santos Ruiz (born 4 October 1999 in Utrera, Seville) is a Spanish chess grandmaster, player of the Spanish National Team, coach of the Swiss Absolute National Team and current coach of Fabiano Caruana, the world number 2 in chess. He was awarded the title of International Grandmaster (GM) by FIDE in 2019.

Santos is the great-great-grandson of the philosopher Miguel de Unamuno, and great-grandson of Fernando de Unamuno. On the FIDE Elo list of May 2021 he had an ELO of 2594 points, making him the ninth highest-ranked active player in Spain and 263rd in the world. His peak rating has been 2605 ELO fide in classical chess.

== Chess Player ==
- In 2013 he was proclaimed Spanish under-16 champion in Salobreña. Also in 2013 he tied for first place, and was runner-up on a tie-break, at the under-14 European Championships (the champion was Jorden Van Foreest). In 2017 he tied for third place at the U18 European Championships (the champion was Jesper Søndergaard Thybo).
- In March 2018 he was 19th in the European Individual Championship in Batumi (Georgia), the first Spanish qualifier, and that gave him a place in the 2019 World Chess Cup. Later in this competition he was eliminated by top GM Wei Yi in the first round.
- Also in 2018 he won the Grandmaster title. In October 2019 he was fourth in the World Under-20 Chess Championship held in New Delhi (the champion was Evgeny Shtembuliak).
- In November 2019 he was ninth in the Spanish Absolute Championship in Marbella (the champion was Alexei Shirov).
- Also in November 2019 he was third in the ‘II Festival VIII Centenario de la Universidad de Salamanca’, behind the Venezuelan grandmaster Eduardo Iturrizaga and Ruslan Ponomariov

== Chess Commentator ==
He has also developed a chess commentary, first on the chess24 platform, then on chess.com and currently also on his own youtube channel. He is known for sharing in his content a solid knowledge of opening theory.

== Chess Coach ==
Another facet that he has developed within the field of chess has been as a coach. In this aspect he has been,

- Coach of the Swiss Absolute National Team
- Current coach of GM Fabiano Caruana, the world number 2 in classical chess.
