= Anton Demchenko =

Russian-Slovenian chess grandmaster (born 1987)

- Demchenko in 2026

Personal information
- Born: August 20, 1987 (age 39) Novorossiysk, Russian SFSR, Soviet Union

Chess career
- Country: Russia (until 2023); Slovenia (since 2023)
- Title: Grandmaster (2013)
- FIDE rating: 2579 (November 2026)
- Peak rating: 2679 (April 2018)
- Peak ranking: No. 60 (May 2018)

Anton Demchenko (born 20 August 1987) is a Russian chess grandmaster who represents Slovenia. He competed in the FIDE World Cup in 2017.

== Career ==
Demchenko won the PSC/Puregold International Chess Challenge in Quezon City in 2014, the ZMDI Open in Dresden in 2016, the 47th International Tournament Bosna (pl) in Sarajevo in 2017 and the European Individual Chess Championship in Reykjavik in 2021.

Together with 43 other Russian elite chess players, Demchenko signed an open letter to Russian president Vladimir Putin, protesting against the 2022 Russian invasion of Ukraine and expressing solidarity with the Ukrainian people.
