= Johan-Sebastian Christiansen =

Norwegian chess grandmaster (born 1998)

Personal information
- Born: 10 June 1998 (age 28)

Chess career
- Country: Norway
- Title: Grandmaster (2018)
- FIDE rating: 2633 (November 2026)
- Peak rating: 2664 (January 2025)
- Ranking: No. 89 (November 2026)
- Peak ranking: No. 53 (November 2025)

Johan-Sebastian Christiansen (born 10 June 1998) is a Norwegian chess grandmaster. He was awarded the titles International Master, in 2015, and Grandmaster, in 2018, by FIDE.

== Personal life ==
Christiansen was born on 10 June 1998.

== Chess career ==
Christiansen first played for the Sandefjord-based chess club Caissa, and later for Vålerenga and Offerspill.

He achieved the norms required for the title of Grandmaster in the 2017 European Team Chess Championship in Hersonissos, in Pardubice in July 2018 and in Gothenburg in August 2018.

In 2022, Christiansen won the 1st Colonia de Sant Jordi Chess Festival on a tie-break with Brandon Clarke, with a score of 7.5/9.
