= Grigoriy Oparin =

Russian-American chess grandmaster (born 1997)

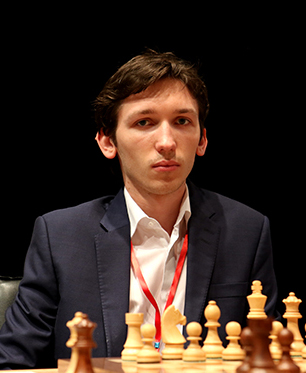
- Oparin at Satka tournament in 2018

Personal information
- Born: Grigoriy Alekseyevich Oparin; 1 July 1997 (age 29) Munich, Germany

Chess career
- Country: Russia (until May 2022); United States (since June 2022) (Note: Several Russian players officially switched in response to the 2022 Russian invasion of Ukraine.)
- Title: Grandmaster (2013)
- FIDE rating: 2643 (July 2026)
- Peak rating: 2687 (June 2023)
- Ranking: No. 76 (July 2026)
- Peak ranking: No. 49 (June 2022)

Grigoriy Alekseyevich Oparin (Russian: Григо́рий Алексе́евич Опа́рин; born 1 July 1997) is a Russian-American chess player. He was awarded the title Grandmaster by FIDE in 2013.

== Career ==
Oparin was awarded the title of Candidate Master in 2007, as a result of his second place, behind Kirill Alekseenko, at the European Youth Chess Championships in the Under 10 division. He was awarded the title International Master (IM) in 2011. The norms required for the title were achieved in Mariánské Lázně, Czech Republic, Autumn in Livingroom V. Dvorkovich and RSSU-18 IM tournaments in Moscow in 2009, 2011 Aeroflot Open B tournament, and First Saturday Tournament of April 2011 in Budapest.

=== 2010s ===
In May 2012 he finished third, behind Vladislav Artemiev and Vladimir Belous, at the World Youth Stars tournament in Kirishi. In July 2013 Oparin played for the silver medal-winning Russian team in the World Youth Under-16 Chess Olympiad in Chongqin, China. In this competition he also won an individual gold medal as the best player on board 2. In September, he won the Trieste Open. With this victory he achieved his third and final norm required for the title of Grandmaster (GM), the first two coming from the 2011 Chigorin Memorial and Masters Open of the 2013 Gibraltar Chess Festival.

In March 2014, Oparin scored 7½/11 points in the European Individual Chess Championship, which qualified the top 23 finishers to the FIDE World Cup. He tied for 10th-24th places, finishing 24th on tiebreak score. The following month, he won the Russian Junior Championship. Two years later, he won the Russian Higher League, the qualifier for the Superfinal of the Russian Chess Championship. In this latter event, he scored 5½/11 points.

In December 2016, Oparin took part in the Nutcracker Match of the Generations in Moscow. It was a match between two teams, Kings (Boris Gelfand, Alexander Morozevich, Alexei Shirov and Alexey Dreev) and Princes (Vladimir Fedoseev, Daniil Dubov, Vladislav Artemiev and Oparin), held with the Scheveningen system. Oparin and Shirov were the best players scoring 10 points and played a two-game playoff match. Oparin won by 1½-½ and qualified to play in the Kortchnoi Zurich Chess Challenge.

=== 2020s ===
In November 2021, Oparin took the 3rd place in the FIDE Grand Swiss Tournament 2021, thus becoming the 2nd runner-up behind the champion Alireza Firouzja and the 1st runner-up Fabiano Caruana. Oparin and Caruana had both 7.5 points but Oparin had a weaker tiebreak. However, he qualified to take part in the FIDE Grand Prix 2022. In the first leg of the FIDE Grand Prix 2022, he placed last in Pool B with a 2.5/6 result. In the third leg, he finished second in Pool A with a result of 3.5/6, finishing 14th in the standings with four points. He is a well-known second of Fabiano Caruana.
