= Maxim Rodshtein =

Israeli chess grandmaster (born 1989)

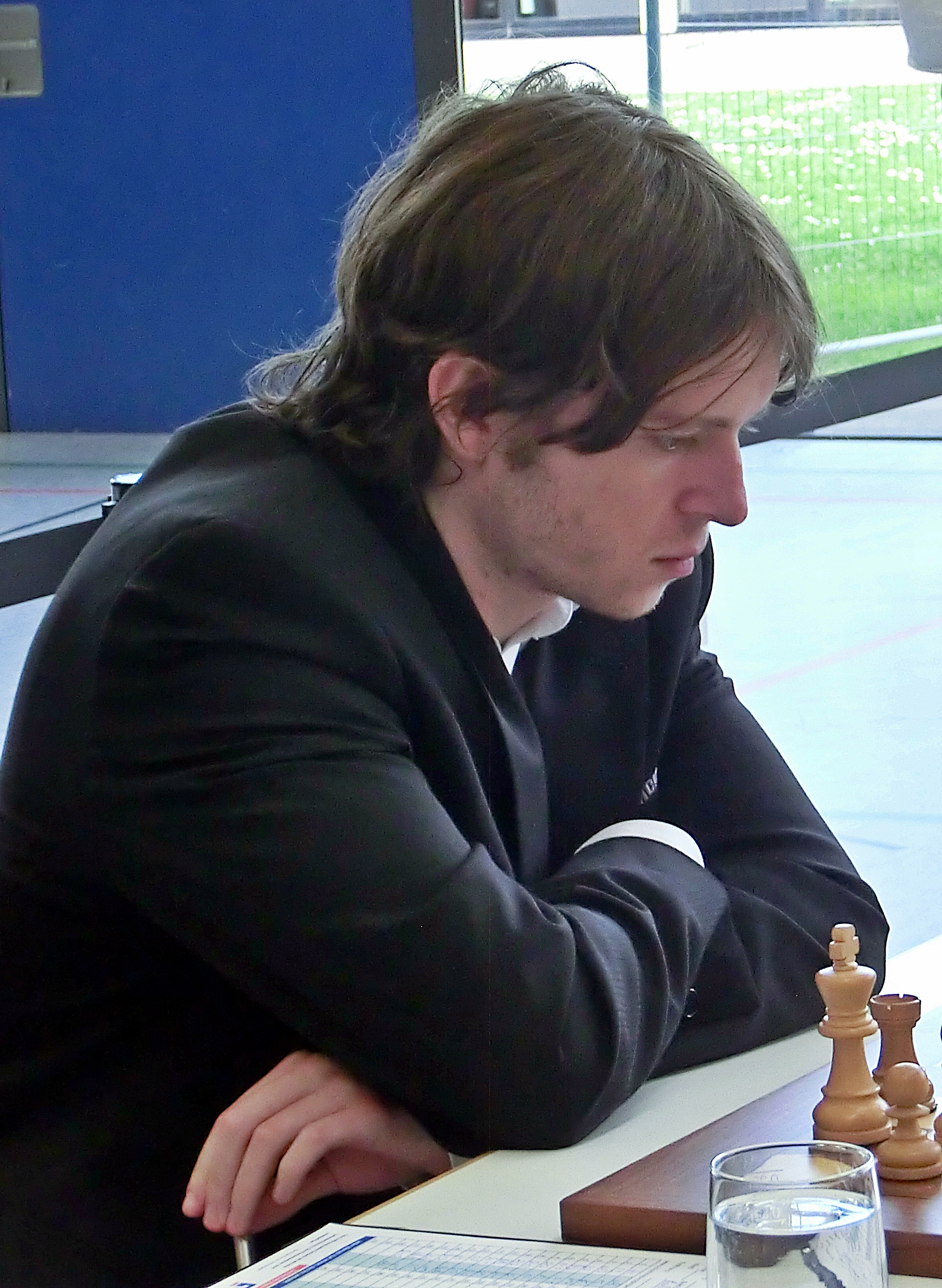
- Rodshtein in 2014

Personal information
- Native name: מקסים רודשטיין
- Born: 19 January 1989 (age 37) Leningrad, Russian SFSR, USSR
- Spouse: Tereza Olsarová

Chess career
- Country: Israel
- Title: Grandmaster (2007)
- FIDE rating: 2600 (July 2026)
- Peak rating: 2710 (March 2016)
- Peak ranking: No. 37 (March 2016)

Maxim Rodshtein (Hebrew: מקסים רודשטיין, Russian: Максим Эдуардович Родштейн, romanized: Maksim Eduardovich Rodshtein; born 19 January 1989) is an Israeli chess grandmaster. He competed in the FIDE World Cup in 2007, 2011, 2015 and 2017.

== Career ==
Rodshtein was twice silver medallist in the European Youth Chess Championships: in the Under 10 section in 1999 and the Under 14 in 2002. He won the Under 16 division of the World Youth Chess Championships in Heraklio, Greece in 2004. In 2006 he won the Israeli Chess Championship. He won the 25th Andorra International Open (30 June – 8 July 2007) in a three-way tie for first in a field of 101 players.

In 2008, Rodshtein was a member of the Israeli team in the 38th Chess Olympiad in Dresden; he scored 7 points from 9 games, contributing to the team silver medal. In particular, he was responsible for Israel's win against the Olympic champion, Armenia. A few months later he was offered by Armenia's No. 1 Levon Aronian to work with him as a second. Rodshtein shared 1st in the 2008 Israeli championship, but didn't retain the title due to inferior tie-break. In 2010 he took clear first place in the 12th International Open of Sants, Hostafrancs and La Bordeta in Barcelona. In 2011 Rodshtein tied for 4th–10th with Rustam Kasimdzhanov, Gata Kamsky, Rauf Mamedov, Ivan Cheparinov, Denis Khismatullin and Yu Yangyi in the Aeroflot Open in Moscow. In the same tournament in 2012, he tied for 4th–8th with Alexander Khalifman, Hrant Melkumyan, Fabiano Caruana and Dmitry Andreikin. Rodshtein tied for first with Sanan Sjugirov, Parimarjan Negi, Vlad-Cristian Jianu, Sergey Fedorchuk, Eric Hansen, Alexei Fedorov, and Yuri Vovk, finishing third on tiebreak, at the 2013 Cappelle-la-Grande Open. He won the 45th Rilton Cup, which took place from 27 December 2015 to 5 January 2016 in Stockholm, with a score of 8/9 points.

== Personal life ==
He served in the Israeli Air Force.

Rodshtein is married to Czech WGM Tereza Olsarová.

== See also ==
- List of Jewish chess players
