= Champions Chess Tour 2024 =

Series of elite chess tournaments

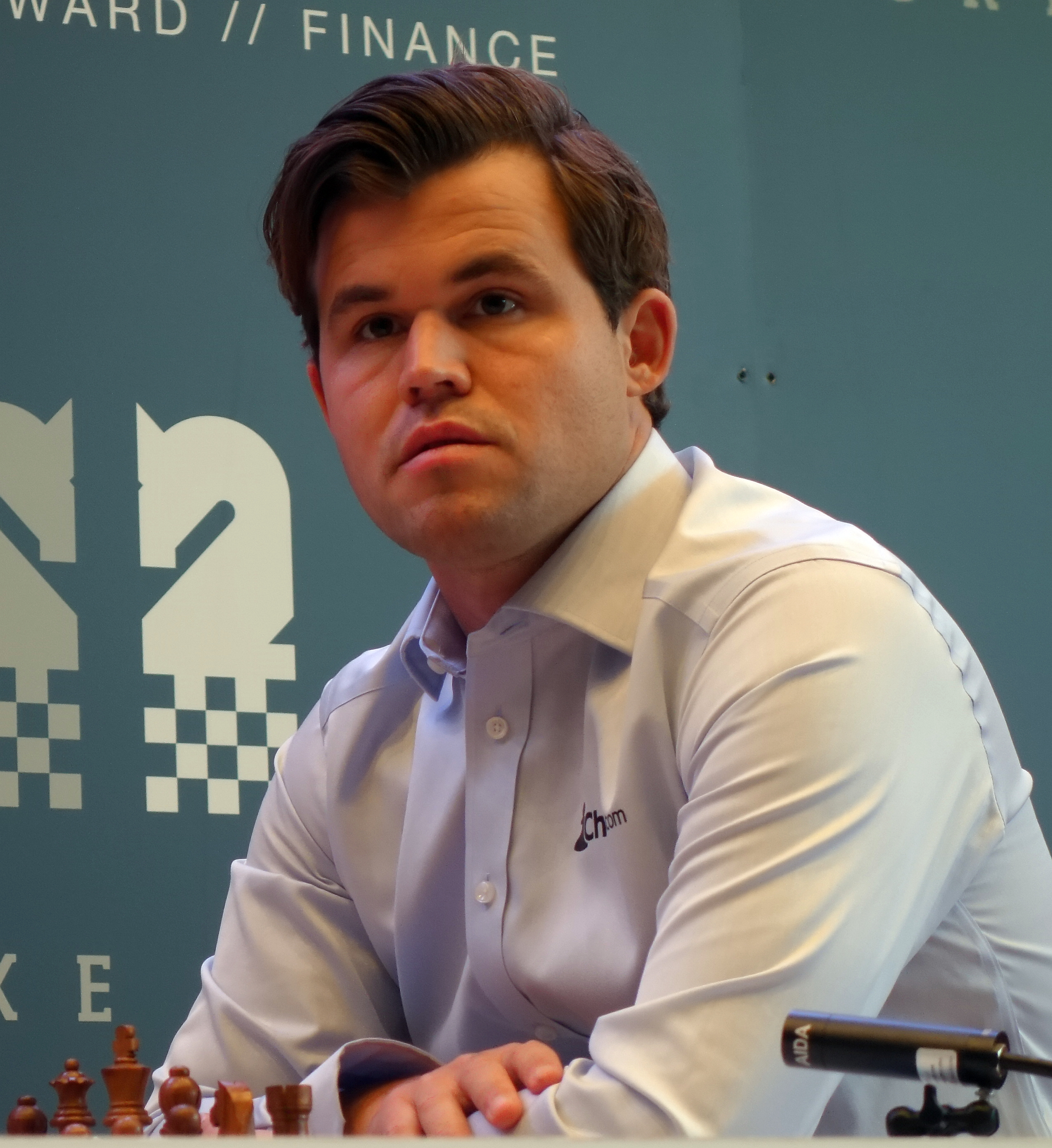
- Magnus Carlsen, winner of the tour

Details
- Duration: 26 January – 21 December 2024
- Tournaments: 5
- Categories: Regular (4); Finals (1)

Achievements (singles)
- Most titles: (Norway) Magnus Carlsen (2)
- Prize money leader: (Norway) Magnus Carlsen ($93,000)
- Points leader: (France) Alireza Firouzja (340)

The Champions Chess Tour (CCT) 2024 was a fast chess tournament circuit organized in 2024 by Chess.com. The tour started on 26 January 2024 and ended on 21 December 2024. It involved four online chess tournaments and an over-the-board final round, featuring some of the world's top players who played for a prize money pool of US$1,700,000.

== Format ==
=== Regular tournament ===
Each Regular tournament was conducted in the following stages:

Stage		Format	Players entering this round	Players advancing from previous round
Qualifiers		Swiss-system; 9 rounds	Titled players below Grandmaster	—N/a
Play-In		Swiss-system; 9 rounds	Grandmasters; Top 3 from Qualifier of past 2024 Regular tournaments	Top 3 from Qualifier
Division Placement	Div. I	Single-elimination; 2 rounds R1: 2-games match R2: 4-games match	Bye to Round 2: 3rd-4th from Div. I of previous Regular tournament; 2nd from Div. II of previous Regular tournament; Winner from Div. III of previous Regular tournament	Bye to Round 2: Winner from Play-In; Entering Round 1: 2nd-11th from Play-In
Division Placement	Div. II	Single-elimination; 2 rounds R1: 2-games match R2: 4-games match		Bye to Round 2: 12th-17th from Play-In; Entering Round 1: 18th-29th from Play-In
Division Placement	Div. III	Single match 4-games match		30th-69th from Play-In
Division Play	Div. I	Double-elimination; Upper: 4-games match Lower: 2-games match	Top 2 from Div. I of previous Regular tournament; Winner from Div. II of previous Regular tournament	5 winners from Div. I Placement
Division Play	Div. II	Double-elimination; Upper: 4-games match Lower: 2-games match		10 losers from Div. I Placement; 6 winners from Div. II Placement
Division Play	Div. III	Double-elimination; Upper: 4-games match Lower: 2-games match		12 losers from Div. II Placement; 20 winners from Div. III Placement

- Every game is played under the time control of 10+2.
- In Division Placement and Division Play, if a match is tied, an armageddon game is played to decide the winner, using bidding system to determine playing time and color (base time of 10 minutes).
- For Chessable Masters, the first event of 2024 edition, 2023 AI Cup was designated as its previous Regular tournament.

=== Finals ===
The CCT 2024 Finals is scheduled as an in-person event in Oslo, Norway. Eight players, Division I winners from each of the four Regular events and top players in the points leaderboard, are invited. The format for the event is similar to the previous year, which goes as follows:

- Round-robin stage: Eight players play each other in two-game matches. If a match is tied, an armageddon game is played to decide the winner of the match. First and second place directly qualified to semifinals, third to sixth place advanced to the survival stage, while the last two places are eliminated.
- Survival stage: The four players in this stage play a mini double-elimination tournament, with 3rd and 4th starting in upper bracket, and 5th-6th in lower bracket. Each match consist of two games, with armageddon tiebreak. Two players, winner of each of upper and lower bracket, advance to the semifinals.
- Semifinals and final: Four players play a single-elimination tournament to determine the Tour winner. Each match consist of six games.

== Tour points and prize money ==
=== Regular ===
The total prize pool for a Regular tournament is US$300,000 for each tournament, distributed as follows:

==== Points ====
Finish	Division I	Division II	Division III
1st	100	50	30
2nd	80	40	25
3rd	60	30	20
4th	50	25	15
5th (x2)	40	20	10
7th (x2)	30	15	7
9th (x4)	-	10	5
13th (x4)	-	5	3
17th (x8)	-	-	2
25th (x8)	-	-	1

==== Prize Money ====
Finish	Division I	Division II	Division III
1st	$30,000	$15,000	$7,500
2nd	$20,000	$10,000	$6,000
3rd	$15,000	$7,500	$5,000
4th	$12,500	$6,000	$4,000
5th (x2)	$10,000	$5,500	$3,500
7th (x2)	$7,500	$5,000	$3,000
9th (x4)	-	$4,500	$2,600
13th (x4)	-	$4,000	$2,200
17th (x8)	-	-	$1,850
25th (x8)	-	-	$1,500
Placement (x20)	-	-	$500
Total	$112,500	$93,500	$91,500

=== Finals ===
The Finals will have a $500,000 purse.

Placing	Prize
1st	$200,000
2nd	$100,000
3rd-4th (x2)	$50,000
5th	$25,000
6th	$20,000
7th	$15,000
8th	$12,000
Per Playoff match win	$1,000

== Tournament schedule and results ==
Champions Chess Tour tournaments
Tournament	Dates	Prize	Division I				Winner of Division II	Winner of Division III
Tournament	Dates	Prize	Winner	Second (or finalist)	Third	Fourth	Winner of Division II	Winner of Division III
Chessable Masters	January 31–February 7	$300,000	(Norway) Magnus Carlsen	(France) Alireza Firouzja	Denis Lazavik	Ian Nepomniachtchi	(Germany) Vincent Keymer	(Serbia) Alexey Sarana
Chess.com Classic	May 10–16	$300,000	(France) Alireza Firouzja	(Norway) Magnus Carlsen	(Germany) Vincent Keymer	(Poland) Jan-Krzysztof Duda	(France) Maxime Vachier-Lagrave	(FIDE) Dmitry Andreikin
CrunchLabs Masters	July 17–24	$300,000	(France) Maxime Vachier-Lagrave	(France) Alireza Firouzja	Ian Nepomniachtchi	(Norway) Magnus Carlsen	Alexander Grischuk	(India) Arjun Erigaisi
Julius Baer Generation Cup	September 25–October 2	$300,000	(Norway) Magnus Carlsen	(France) Alireza Firouzja	(United States) Levon Aronian	(France) Maxime Vachier-Lagrave	(United States) Wesley So	(United States) Fabiano Caruana
Final	December 14–21	$500,000	(Norway) Magnus Carlsen	Ian Nepomniachtchi				

== Standings ==
Prize money is shown in US dollars. Bold number denotes a win in that division. L denotes losers of Division III Placement stage.

Legend
Did not qualify/participate	Division I	Division II	Division III

Pos	Name	Chessable Masters	Chess.com Classic	CrunchLabs Masters	Julius Baer Generation Cup	Total Points	Prize money
1	(France) Alireza Firouzja	80	100	80	80	340	$90,000
2	(Norway) Magnus Carlsen	100	80	50	100	330	$93,000
3	(France) Maxime Vachier-Lagrave	30	50	100	50	230	$65,500
4	Ian Nepomniachtchi	50	40	60	30	180	$45,000
5	(United States) Wesley So	30	40	40	50	160	$42,500
6	Denis Lazavik	60	40	3	40	143	$37,200
7	(Germany) Vincent Keymer	50	60		25	135	$36,000
8	(United States) Levon Aronian	40	25	10	60	135	$35,500
9	Alexander Grischuk	25		50	40	115	$31,000
10	(Slovenia) Vladimir Fedoseev	40		25	40	105	$26,000
11	(Poland) Jan-Krzysztof Duda		50	40	1	91	$24,000
12	(India) Vidit Gujrathi	L	20	40	25	85	$22,000
13	(Mexico) José Martínez	40	10	L	30	80	$20,000
14	(United States) Fabiano Caruana		10	30	30	70	$19,500
15	(Serbia) Alexey Sarana	30	30		1	61	$16,500
16	(FIDE) Dmitry Andreikin		30	30		60	$15,000
16	(India) Arjun Erigaisi			30	30	60	$15,000
18	(Netherlands) Benjamin Bok	30	2	2	10	44	$15,700
19	(France) Jules Moussard		2	20	20	42	$12,350
20	(Ukraine) Olexandr Bortnyk	20		7	15	42	$13,000
21	(United States) Hikaru Nakamura	10		30		40	$12,000
22	(United States) Grigoriy Oparin		30	5	5	40	$15,500
23	(Armenia) Shant Sargsyan			20	20	40	$10,500
24	(India) Karthikeyan Murali	5	20	15	L	40	$13,100
25	(Serbia) Velimir Ivić		30	3		33	$9,700

Pos	Name	Chessable Masters	Chess.com Classic	CrunchLabs Masters	Julius Baer Generation Cup	Total Points	Prize money
26	Daniil Dubov	1	20	10		31	$10,500
27	(Iran) Bardiya Daneshvar	10	5		15	30	$11,100
28	(Spain) David Antón Guijarro	10	L	10	10	30	$13,000
29	(Netherlands) Anish Giri	20	7			27	$8,500
29	(Serbia) Aleksandar Inđić	7			20	27	$8,500
31	(Azerbaijan) Vasif Durarbayli		2	15	10	27	$11,350
32	Vladislav Artemiev	25				25	$6,000
33	(Israel) Evgeny Alekseev	L		25		25	$6,500
33	(Sweden) Nils Grandelius		25			25	$6,000
35	(United States) Samuel Sevian	10	15		L	25	$10,000
36	(Vietnam) Lê Tuấn Minh	L	15	10		25	$9,000
37	(Spain) Jaime Santos Latasa	5		15	2	22	$8,450
38	(China) Yu Yangyi	20				20	$5,500
38	Vladimir Kramnik			20		20	$5,500
40	(Azerbaijan) Rauf Mamedov	15	5			20	$7,600
41	(FIDE) David Paravyan	10	5	5		20	$8,700
42	(Armenia) Aram Hakobyan	L	10	5	3	18	$9,800
43	Andrey Esipenko		15	L	2	17	$7,350
44	(Uzbekistan) Javokhir Sindarov			7	10	17	$6,500
45	(Romania) Bogdan-Daniel Deac	3	7	5	2	17	$11,050
46	(United States) Jeffery Xiong	15	L			15	$5,500
47	(Azerbaijan) Eltaj Safarli	15			L	15	$4,500
47	(Israel) Boris Gelfand				15	15	$4,000
49	Maxim Matlakov	5		10		15	$7,100
50	(Germany) Frederik Svane			10	2	12	$6,350
51	(FIDE) Mikhail Antipov	7		5		12	$7,000
52	(Armenia) Samvel Ter-Sahakyan	10	L		L	10	$5,500
52	(Germany) Dmitrij Kollars		10	L	L	10	$5,500
52	(Uzbekistan) Mukhiddin Madaminov				10	10	$4,500
55	(Hungary) Ádám Kozák		10			10	$3,500
55	(Vietnam) Nguyễn Ngọc Trường Sơn		10			10	$3,500
55	(Ukraine) Anton Korobov				10	10	$3,500
58	(United States) Christopher Yoo	3	L		7	10	$5,700
59	(United States) Hans Niemann		1		7	8	$4,500
60	(FIDE) Rudik Makarian			3	5	8	$4,800
61	(Armenia) Haik M. Martirosyan	5			2	7	$5,850
61	(FIDE) Aleksandr Rakhmanov	2	5			7	$5,850
63	(Uzbekistan) Shamsiddin Vokhidov	5	1	1	L	7	$7,500
64	(Germany) Matthias Blübaum	L	5	L		5	$5,000
64	(Spain) Alan Pichot		L	5		5	$4,500
64	(Uzbekistan) Nodirbek Yakubboev			L	5	5	$4,500
64	(FIDE) Peter Svidler	5	L			5	$4,500
64	Aleksandr Shimanov	5				5	$4,000
64	(United States) Leinier Domínguez		5			5	$4,000
64	(Netherlands) Jorden van Foreest		5			5	$4,000
64	(United States) Ray Robson				5	5	$4,000
72	(Czech Republic) David Navara		L		5	5	$3,100
72	(Iran) Amin Tabatabaei	5				5	$2,600
72	(United States) Andrew Tang		5			5	$2,600
72	(Uruguay) Georg Meier			5		5	$2,600
72	(India) Abhimanyu Puranik			5		5	$2,600
72	(India) Bharath Subramaniyam				5	5	$2,600
72	(Greece) Nikolas Theodorou				5	5	$2,600
79	(Austria) Kirill Alekseenko	2	L	L	3	5	$5,050
79	(Ukraine) Yuriy Kuzubov	3		2	L	5	$4,550
81	(United States) Gata Kamsky		1	1	3	5	$5,200
82	(Germany) Rasmus Svane	1	L	2	2	5	$5,700
83	(Spain) Eduardo Iturrizaga		3	L		3	$2,700
83	(FIDE) Sergei Lobanov		3	L		3	$2,700
83	(FIDE) Igor Lysyj	3				3	$2,200
83	(Azerbaijan) Vugar Rasulov		3			3	$2,200
83	(Netherlands) Max Warmerdam		3			3	$2,200
83	(Poland) Maciej Klekowski			3		3	$2,200
83	(Croatia) Marin Bosiočić				3	3	$2,200
90	(Hungary) Benjámin Gledura		2	1	L	3	$3,850
90	(Armenia) Gabriel Sargissian	2			1	3	$3,350
90	Alexey Dreev	1		2		3	$3,350
93	(Chile) Cristobal Henriquez Villagra	2	L			2	$2,350
93	(Latvia) Nikita Meshkovs	2		L		2	$2,350
93	(India) P. Iniyan			2	L	2	$2,350
93	(Netherlands) Thomas Beerdsen			2	L	2	$2,350
93	(Serbia) Alexandr Predke	L			2	2	$2,350
93	(United States) Abhimanyu Mishra	2				2	$1,850
93	(Poland) Kacper Piorun	2				2	$1,850
93	(Ukraine) Ruslan Ponomariov	2				2	$1,850
93	(Iran) Pouya Idani		2			2	$1,850
93	(Azerbaijan) Teimour Radjabov		2			2	$1,850
93	(India) Raunak Sadhwani		2			2	$1,850
93	(Hungary) Sanan Sjugirov		2			2	$1,850
93	(Netherlands) Erwin l'Ami			2		2	$1,850
93	(Uzbekistan) Jakhongir Vakhidov			2		2	$1,850
93	(Egypt) Bassem Amin				2	2	$1,850
108	(India) Pranav V			1	1	2	$3,000
109	(Azerbaijan) Gadir Guseinov	L		L	1	1	$2,500
109	(Ukraine) Vitaliy Bernadskiy	L	1			1	$2,000
109	(FIDE) Vladislav Kovalev	L	1			1	$2,000
109	(Poland) Kamil Dragun	L		1		1	$2,000
109	(Austria) Felix Blohberger			1	L	1	$2,000
109	(Slovenia) Anton Demchenko	1				1	$1,500
109	(France) Laurent Fressinet	1				1	$1,500
109	(FIDE) Vladimir Malakhov	1				1	$1,500
109	(India) S. P. Sethuraman	1				1	$1,500
109	(Romania) Kirill Shevchenko	1				1	$1,500
109	(Denmark) Jonas Buhl Bjerre		1			1	$1,500
109	(Vietnam) Lê Quang Liêm		1			1	$1,500
109	(Ukraine) Alexander Moiseenko		1			1	$1,500
109	(Hungary) Tamás Bánusz			1		1	$1,500
109	(Azerbaijan) Read Samadov			1		1	$1,500
109	(FIDE) Mikhail Kobalia				1	1	$1,500
109	Pavel Ponkratov				1	1	$1,500
109	(Turkey) Mustafa Yılmaz				1	1	$1,500
–	Pavel Smirnov	L	L	L	L	0	$2,000
–	(Ukraine) Martyn Kravtsiv	L	L			0	$1,000
–	(Spain) Maksim Chigaev	L			L	0	$1,000
–	(Norway) Johan-Sebastian Christiansen	L				0	$500
–	(United States) Andrew Hong	L				0	$500
–	(Romania) Constantin Lupulescu	L				0	$500
–	(Armenia) Emin Ohanyan	L				0	$500
–	(India) Raja Rithvik R	L				0	$500
–	(India) Aditya Samant	L				0	$500
–	(Croatia) Ivan Saric	L				0	$500
–	(Uzbekistan) Nodirbek Abdusattorov		L			0	$500
–	(India) Sankalp Gupta		L			0	$500
–	(Kazakhstan) Rinat Jumabayev		L			0	$500
–	(Latvia) Toms Kantāns		L			0	$500
–	(Brazil) Krikor Mekhitarian		L			0	$500
–	(India) Leon Luke Mendonca		L			0	$500
–	(Azerbaijan) Mahammad Muradli		L			0	$500
–	(Poland) Zbigniew Pakleza		L			0	$500
–	(Brazil) Yago De Moura Santiago			L		0	$500
–	(FIDE) Dmitry Frolyanov			L		0	$500
–	(Armenia) Arman Mikaelyan			L		0	$500
–	(Poland) Grzegorz Nasuta			L		0	$500
–	(Hungary) Péter Prohászka			L		0	$500
–	(Brazil) Renato Quintiliano			L		0	$500
–	Alexander Rustemov			L		0	$500
–	(India) Vaibhav Suri			L		0	$500
–	(FIDE) Klementy Sychev			L		0	$500
–	Sergey Drygalov				L	0	$500
–	(Turkey) Eray Kılıç				L	0	$500
–	(FIDE) Arseniy Nesterov				L	0	$500
–	(Georgia (country)) Levan Pantsulaia				L	0	$500
–	(Armenia) Robert Piliposyan				L	0	$500
–	(Ukraine) Ihor Samunenkov				L	0	$500
–	(United States) Andy Woodward				L	0	$500

== Tournaments details ==
=== Chessable Masters ===
Division I Play-off

Champion Round 1	Champion Round 2	Champion Final	Final
(France) Maxime Vachier-Lagrave	2
Denis Lazavik	3
Denis Lazavik	2½
(Mexico) José Martínez	½
Ian Nepomniachtchi	1
(Mexico) José Martínez	3
Denis Lazavik	1½
(Norway) Magnus Carlsen	2½
(Norway) Magnus Carlsen	2½
(United States) Wesley So	1½
(Norway) Magnus Carlsen	2½ (Note: Advanced further by drawing armageddon game with black)
(Slovenia) Vladimir Fedoseev	2½
(Slovenia) Vladimir Fedoseev	2½
(France) Alireza Firouzja	1½	(Norway) Magnus Carlsen	1½	2
(France) Alireza Firouzja	2½	0
Elimination Round 1	Elimination Round 2	Elimination Round 3	Elimination Final
(Slovenia) Vladimir Fedoseev	1
(France) Maxime Vachier-Lagrave	1	Ian Nepomniachtchi	2	Denis Lazavik	½
Ian Nepomniachtchi	2	Ian Nepomniachtchi	1½	(France) Alireza Firouzja	1½
(France) Alireza Firouzja	1½
(Mexico) José Martínez	½
(United States) Wesley So	½	(France) Alireza Firouzja	1½
(France) Alireza Firouzja	1½

Division II Play-off

Upper round 1	Upper round 2	Upper round 3	Upper final	Final
(Netherlands) Anish Giri	2
(United States) Jeffery Xiong	3
(United States) Jeffery Xiong	1
(Germany) Vincent Keymer	3
(Germany) Vincent Keymer	3
(FIDE) Peter Svidler	0
(Germany) Vincent Keymer	3
(Netherlands) Benjamin Bok	2
(Armenia) Samvel Ter-Sahakyan	2½
Aleksandr Shimanov	1½
(Armenia) Samvel Ter-Sahakyan	1
(Netherlands) Benjamin Bok	3
(Azerbaijan) Rauf Mamedov	1
(Netherlands) Benjamin Bok	3
(Germany) Vincent Keymer	2½
(United States) Levon Aronian	½
Vladislav Artemiev	2½
(Armenia) Haik M. Martirosyan	½
Vladislav Artemiev	3
(United States) Hikaru Nakamura	2
(United States) Hikaru Nakamura	3
(China) Yu Yangyi	1
Vladislav Artemiev	1½
(United States) Levon Aronian	2½
(United States) Samuel Sevian	2½
(Uzbekistan) Shamsiddin Vokhidov	1½
(United States) Samuel Sevian	½	(Germany) Vincent Keymer	2	2
(United States) Levon Aronian	2½	(United States) Levon Aronian	3	0
(Spain) David Antón Guijarro	1
(United States) Levon Aronian	3
Lower round 1	Lower round 2	Lower round 3	Lower round 4	Lower round 5	Lower final
(United States) Samuel Sevian	1
(Netherlands) Benjamin Bok	2
(Netherlands) Anish Giri	2	(Netherlands) Anish Giri	2
(Netherlands) Anish Giri	2	(Netherlands) Anish Giri	1
(FIDE) Peter Svidler	1
(Azerbaijan) Rauf Mamedov	0	(United States) Levon Aronian	1½
(United States) Hikaru Nakamura	1
(Netherlands) Benjamin Bok	2	(Netherlands) Benjamin Bok	1½
Aleksandr Shimanov	½	(Azerbaijan) Rauf Mamedov	2
Vladislav Artemiev	1
(Azerbaijan) Rauf Mamedov	1½
(Armenia) Samvel Ter-Sahakyan	½
Vladislav Artemiev	1½
(Armenia) Haik M. Martirosyan	1	(China) Yu Yangyi	1½
(China) Yu Yangyi	1½	(China) Yu Yangyi	1½
(China) Yu Yangyi	2
(United States) Jeffery Xiong	½
(United States) Jeffery Xiong	1½
(Uzbekistan) Shamsiddin Vokhidov	½	(Spain) David Antón Guijarro	½
(Spain) David Antón Guijarro	1½

Division III Play-off

Round 1	Round 2	Round 3	Round 4	Round 5	Final
(FIDE) David Paravyan	3
(Slovenia) Anton Demchenko	2	(FIDE) David Paravyan	2½
(Iran) Bardiya Daneshvar	1½	(Austria) Kirill Alekseenko	2½
(Austria) Kirill Alekseenko	2½	(FIDE) David Paravyan	2½
(India) S. P. Sethuraman	0	(India) Karthikeyan Murali	½
(India) Karthikeyan Murali	3	(India) Karthikeyan Murali	2½
(Ukraine) Yuriy Kuzubov	1½	(Chile) Cristobal Henriquez Villagra	½
(Chile) Cristobal Henriquez Villagra	2½	(FIDE) David Paravyan	½
(Poland) Kacper Piorun	2½	(Serbia) Alexey Sarana	2½
(Germany) Rasmus Svane	½	(Poland) Kacper Piorun	0
(Serbia) Alexey Sarana	3	(Serbia) Alexey Sarana	3
(United States) Christopher Yoo	2	(Serbia) Alexey Sarana	3
(FIDE) Igor Lysyj	3	Maxim Matlakov	2
Alexey Dreev	2	(FIDE) Igor Lysyj	1½
(FIDE) Mikhail Antipov	½	Maxim Matlakov	2½
Maxim Matlakov	2½	(Serbia) Alexey Sarana	3
(Serbia) Aleksandar Inđić	2½	Alexander Grischuk	0
(Armenia) Gabriel Sargissian	1½	(Serbia) Aleksandar Inđić	2½
(Ukraine) Ruslan Ponomariov	2½	(Ukraine) Ruslan Ponomariov	2½
(France) Laurent Fressinet	1½	(Serbia) Aleksandar Inđić	1
(Ukraine) Olexandr Bortnyk	0	(Azerbaijan) Eltaj Safarli	3
(Azerbaijan) Eltaj Safarli	3	(Azerbaijan) Eltaj Safarli	2½
(FIDE) Vladimir Malakhov	2	(United States) Abhimanyu Mishra	1½
(United States) Abhimanyu Mishra	3	(Azerbaijan) Eltaj Safarli	2½
(Romania) Kirill Shevchenko	½	Alexander Grischuk	2½
(Spain) Jaime Santos Latasa	2½	(Spain) Jaime Santos Latasa	2½
(Latvia) Nikita Meshkovs	2½	(Latvia) Nikita Meshkovs	½
(Romania) Bogdan-Daniel Deac	½	(Spain) Jaime Santos Latasa	0	(Serbia) Alexey Sarana	1	2
Alexander Grischuk	2½	Alexander Grischuk	3	Alexander Grischuk	3	0
Daniil Dubov	2½	Alexander Grischuk	3
(FIDE) Aleksandr Rakhmanov	2½	(FIDE) Aleksandr Rakhmanov	2
(Iran) Amin Tabatabaei	1½
Lower round 1	Lower round 2	Lower round 3	Lower round 4	Lower round 5	Lower round 6	Lower round 7	Lower round 8
(Slovenia) Anton Demchenko	1½	(FIDE) Aleksandr Rakhmanov	½	Maxim Matlakov	0
(Iran) Bardiya Daneshvar	1½	(Iran) Bardiya Daneshvar	1½	(Iran) Bardiya Daneshvar	1½	(Iran) Bardiya Daneshvar	2	(Azerbaijan) Eltaj Safarli	2
(India) S. P. Sethuraman	½	(Latvia) Nikita Meshkovs	0	(Ukraine) Yuriy Kuzubov	½	(Iran) Bardiya Daneshvar	2	(Iran) Bardiya Daneshvar	1
(Ukraine) Yuriy Kuzubov	1½	(Ukraine) Yuriy Kuzubov	2	(FIDE) Mikhail Antipov	1
(Germany) Rasmus Svane	1	(United States) Abhimanyu Mishra	½	(India) Karthikeyan Murali	½	Alexander Grischuk	1½
(United States) Christopher Yoo	2	(United States) Christopher Yoo	1½	(United States) Christopher Yoo	0	(FIDE) Mikhail Antipov	1½	(Azerbaijan) Eltaj Safarli	1	(Ukraine) Olexandr Bortnyk	1½
Alexey Dreev	½	(Ukraine) Ruslan Ponomariov	½	(FIDE) Mikhail Antipov	2	(Ukraine) Olexandr Bortnyk	2
(FIDE) Mikhail Antipov	1½	(FIDE) Mikhail Antipov	1½
(Armenia) Gabriel Sargissian	2	(FIDE) Igor Lysyj	2	(Spain) Jaime Santos Latasa	1
(France) Laurent Fressinet	1	(Armenia) Gabriel Sargissian	0	(FIDE) Igor Lysyj	½	(Ukraine) Olexandr Bortnyk	2	(Azerbaijan) Eltaj Safarli	½
(Ukraine) Olexandr Bortnyk	2	(Poland) Kacper Piorun	0	(Ukraine) Olexandr Bortnyk	1½	(Ukraine) Olexandr Bortnyk	2	(Ukraine) Olexandr Bortnyk	1½
(FIDE) Vladimir Malakhov	0	(Ukraine) Olexandr Bortnyk	2	(Serbia) Aleksandar Inđić	1
(Romania) Kirill Shevchenko	1	(Chile) Cristobal Henriquez Villagra	0	(Serbia) Aleksandar Inđić	1½
(Romania) Bogdan-Daniel Deac	2	(Romania) Bogdan-Daniel Deac	2	(Romania) Bogdan-Daniel Deac	1½	(Iran) Amin Tabatabaei	1½
Daniil Dubov	½	(Austria) Kirill Alekseenko	0	(Iran) Amin Tabatabaei	1½
(Iran) Amin Tabatabaei	1½	(Iran) Amin Tabatabaei	2

=== Chess.com Classic ===
Division I Play-off

Champion Round 1	Champion Round 2	Champion Final	Final
(Norway) Magnus Carlsen	2½
(Serbia) Velimir Ivić	½
(Norway) Magnus Carlsen	2½
Denis Lazavik	1½
Denis Lazavik	2½
Ian Nepomniachtchi	1½
(Norway) Magnus Carlsen	2½
(Germany) Vincent Keymer	1½
(France) Alireza Firouzja	2
(Poland) Jan-Krzysztof Duda	3
(Poland) Jan-Krzysztof Duda	½
(Germany) Vincent Keymer	2½
(Germany) Vincent Keymer	2½
(Serbia) Alexey Sarana	½	(Norway) Magnus Carlsen	2	1
(France) Alireza Firouzja	3	2
Elimination Round 1	Elimination Round 2	Elimination Round 3	Elimination Final
(Poland) Jan-Krzysztof Duda	2
(Serbia) Velimir Ivić	0	Ian Nepomniachtchi	1	(Germany) Vincent Keymer	0
Ian Nepomniachtchi	2	(Poland) Jan-Krzysztof Duda	½	(France) Alireza Firouzja	2
(France) Alireza Firouzja	1½
Denis Lazavik	0
(France) Alireza Firouzja	1½	(France) Alireza Firouzja	2
(Serbia) Alexey Sarana	½

Division II Play-off

Upper round 1	Upper round 2	Upper round 3	Upper final	Final
(United States) Levon Aronian	2½
(India) Vidit Gujrathi	½
(United States) Levon Aronian	2½
(Germany) Dmitrij Kollars	½
(Germany) Dmitrij Kollars	3
(United States) Leinier Domínguez	2
(United States) Levon Aronian	1½
(United States) Grigoriy Oparin	2½
(United States) Samuel Sevian	2
(United States) Grigoriy Oparin	3
(United States) Grigoriy Oparin	3
(FIDE) Andrey Esipenko	2
(FIDE) Andrey Esipenko	2½
(FIDE) Aleksandr Rakhmanov	1½
(United States) Grigoriy Oparin	½
(France) Maxime Vachier-Lagrave	2½
(United States) Fabiano Caruana	1½
(Armenia) Aram Hakobyan	2½
(Armenia) Aram Hakobyan	1
Daniil Dubov	3
(Germany) Matthias Blübaum	½
Daniil Dubov	2½
Daniil Dubov	2½
(France) Maxime Vachier-Lagrave	2½
(United States) Wesley So	1½
(Mexico) José Martínez	2½
(Mexico) José Martínez	1½	(France) Maxime Vachier-Lagrave	2	2
(France) Maxime Vachier-Lagrave	2½	(United States) Wesley So	3	0
(France) Maxime Vachier-Lagrave	3
(Netherlands) Jorden van Foreest	2
Lower round 1	Lower round 2	Lower round 3	Lower round 4	Lower round 5	Lower final
(Mexico) José Martínez	0
(United States) Levon Aronian	1½
(India) Vidit Gujrathi	1½	(India) Vidit Gujrathi	2
(India) Vidit Gujrathi	1½	(India) Vidit Gujrathi	½
(United States) Leinier Domínguez	½
(United States) Samuel Sevian	½	(United States) Grigoriy Oparin	0
(Armenia) Aram Hakobyan	0
(United States) Levon Aronian	1	(United States) Wesley So	2
(United States) Samuel Sevian	2	(United States) Samuel Sevian	2
(United States) Wesley So	2
(FIDE) Aleksandr Rakhmanov	0
(FIDE) Andrey Esipenko	2
Daniil Dubov	0
(United States) Fabiano Caruana	2	(United States) Fabiano Caruana	1
(FIDE) Andrey Esipenko	½	(United States) Wesley So	2
(Germany) Matthias Blübaum	1
(United States) Wesley So	1½
(Germany) Dmitrij Kollars	1½
(United States) Wesley So	1½	(United States) Wesley So	1½
(Netherlands) Jorden van Foreest	½

Division III Play-off

Round 1	Round 2	Round 3	Round 4	Round 5	Final
(Hungary) Ádám Kozák	2½
(Ukraine) Vitaliy Bernadskiy	1½	(Hungary) Ádám Kozák	2½
(India) Raunak Sadhwani	2½	(India) Raunak Sadhwani	½
(France) Jules Moussard	½	(Hungary) Ádám Kozák	0
(Vietnam) Nguyễn Ngọc Trường Sơn	2½	(Vietnam) Nguyễn Ngọc Trường Sơn	3
(Denmark) Jonas Buhl Bjerre	1½	(Vietnam) Nguyễn Ngọc Trường Sơn	3
(Hungary) Benjámin Gledura	2½	(Hungary) Benjámin Gledura	2
(Azerbaijan) Vasif Durarbayli	½	(Vietnam) Nguyễn Ngọc Trường Sơn	1½
(Iran) Bardiya Daneshvar	2	(Sweden) Nils Grandelius	2½
(Sweden) Nils Grandelius	3	(Sweden) Nils Grandelius	3
(Netherlands) Benjamin Bok	2½	(Netherlands) Benjamin Bok	2
(Vietnam) Lê Quang Liêm	1½	(Sweden) Nils Grandelius	3
(Hungary) Sanan Sjugirov	2	(United States) Andrew Tang	1
(United States) Andrew Tang	3	(United States) Andrew Tang	2½
(Ukraine) Alexander Moiseenko	1½	(Iran) Pouya Idani	1½
(Iran) Pouya Idani	2½	(Sweden) Nils Grandelius	½
(Netherlands) Max Warmerdam	3	(FIDE) Dmitry Andreikin	2½
(FIDE) Sergei Lobanov	0	(Netherlands) Max Warmerdam	2
(India) Karthikeyan Murali	3	(India) Karthikeyan Murali	3
(United States) Hans Niemann	0	(India) Karthikeyan Murali	0
(Uzbekistan) Shamsiddin Vokhidov	1½	(FIDE) Dmitry Andreikin	3
(Azerbaijan) Teimour Radjabov	2½	(Azerbaijan) Teimour Radjabov	1
(FIDE) Dmitry Andreikin	2½	(FIDE) Dmitry Andreikin	3
(Romania) Bogdan-Daniel Deac	2½	(FIDE) Dmitry Andreikin	2½
(Azerbaijan) Vugar Rasulov	1	(Vietnam) Lê Tuấn Minh	½
(FIDE) David Paravyan	3	(FIDE) David Paravyan	3
(Netherlands) Anish Giri	2½	(Netherlands) Anish Giri	2
(United States) Gata Kamsky	1½	(FIDE) David Paravyan	2	(FIDE) Dmitry Andreikin	3
(Vietnam) Lê Tuấn Minh	3	(Vietnam) Lê Tuấn Minh	3	(Sweden) Nils Grandelius	2
(FIDE) Vladislav Kovalev	1	(Vietnam) Lê Tuấn Minh	2½
(Azerbaijan) Rauf Mamedov	2	(Spain) Eduardo Iturrizaga	1½
(Spain) Eduardo Iturrizaga	3
Lower round 1	Lower round 2	Lower round 3	Lower round 4	Lower round 5	Lower round 6	Lower round 7	Lower round 8
(Ukraine) Vitaliy Bernadskiy	0	(Spain) Eduardo Iturrizaga	1½	(United States) Andrew Tang	0
(France) Jules Moussard	2	(France) Jules Moussard	½	(Spain) Eduardo Iturrizaga	0	(Netherlands) Anish Giri	2	(Vietnam) Lê Tuấn Minh	1½
(Denmark) Jonas Buhl Bjerre	½	(Netherlands) Anish Giri	1½	(Netherlands) Anish Giri	2	(Netherlands) Anish Giri	½	(Hungary) Ádám Kozák	½
(Azerbaijan) Vasif Durarbayli	1½	(Azerbaijan) Vasif Durarbayli	½	(Hungary) Ádám Kozák	1½
(Iran) Bardiya Daneshvar	2	(Azerbaijan) Teimour Radjabov	1	(Hungary) Ádám Kozák	1½	(Sweden) Nils Grandelius	1½
(Vietnam) Lê Quang Liêm	0	(Iran) Bardiya Daneshvar	2	(Iran) Bardiya Daneshvar	2	(Iran) Bardiya Daneshvar	½	(Vietnam) Lê Tuấn Minh	0	(India) Karthikeyan Murali	½
(Hungary) Sanan Sjugirov	1½	(Netherlands) Max Warmerdam	2	(Netherlands) Max Warmerdam	1	(India) Karthikeyan Murali	2
(Ukraine) Alexander Moiseenko	½	(Hungary) Sanan Sjugirov	0
(FIDE) Sergei Lobanov	1½	(Iran) Pouya Idani	½	(FIDE) David Paravyan	1
(United States) Hans Niemann	½	(FIDE) Sergei Lobanov	1½	(FIDE) Sergei Lobanov	½	(Romania) Bogdan-Daniel Deac	2	(Vietnam) Nguyễn Ngọc Trường Sơn	0
(Uzbekistan) Shamsiddin Vokhidov	0	(Netherlands) Benjamin Bok	½	(Romania) Bogdan-Daniel Deac	1½	(Romania) Bogdan-Daniel Deac	½	(India) Karthikeyan Murali	2
(Romania) Bogdan-Daniel Deac	2	(Romania) Bogdan-Daniel Deac	1½	(India) Karthikeyan Murali	1½
(Azerbaijan) Vugar Rasulov	2	(Hungary) Benjámin Gledura	½	(India) Karthikeyan Murali	1½
(United States) Gata Kamsky	1	(Azerbaijan) Vugar Rasulov	1½	(Azerbaijan) Vugar Rasulov	1	(Azerbaijan) Rauf Mamedov	½
(FIDE) Vladislav Kovalev	1½	(India) Raunak Sadhwani	1	(Azerbaijan) Rauf Mamedov	2
(Azerbaijan) Rauf Mamedov	1½	(Azerbaijan) Rauf Mamedov	2

=== CrunchLabs Masters ===
Division I Play-off

Champion Round 1	Champion Round 2	Champion Final	Final
(France) Alireza Firouzja	3
(United States) Fabiano Caruana	2
(France) Alireza Firouzja	2½
(Poland) Jan-Krzysztof Duda	1½
(Poland) Jan-Krzysztof Duda	2½
(United States) Wesley So	1½
(France) Alireza Firouzja	½
(France) Maxime Vachier-Lagrave	2½
(Norway) Magnus Carlsen	3
Ian Nepomniachtchi	0
(Norway) Magnus Carlsen	2
(France) Maxime Vachier-Lagrave	3
(France) Maxime Vachier-Lagrave	2½
(FIDE) Dmitry Andreikin	1½	(France) Maxime Vachier-Lagrave	3
(France) Alireza Firouzja	2
Elimination Round 1	Elimination Round 2	Elimination Round 3	Elimination Final
(Norway) Magnus Carlsen	2
(United States) Fabiano Caruana	0	(United States) Wesley So	1	(France) Alireza Firouzja	1½
(United States) Wesley So	2	(Norway) Magnus Carlsen	1	Ian Nepomniachtchi	½
Ian Nepomniachtchi	2
(Poland) Jan-Krzysztof Duda	½
Ian Nepomniachtchi	1½	Ian Nepomniachtchi	1½
(FIDE) Dmitry Andreikin	½

Division II Play-off

Upper round 1	Upper round 2	Upper round 3	Upper final	Final
(United States) Grigoriy Oparin	½
(India) Karthikeyan Murali	2½
(India) Karthikeyan Murali	0
Alexander Grischuk	3
Maxim Matlakov	2
Alexander Grischuk	3
Alexander Grischuk	2½
(France) Jules Moussard	1½
(France) Jules Moussard	2½
(Spain) Alan Pichot	1½
(France) Jules Moussard	3
(United States) Levon Aronian	2
(United States) Levon Aronian	2½
(Azerbaijan) Vasif Durarbayli	½
Alexander Grischuk	2
(India) Vidit Gujrathi	3
(FIDE) Mikhail Antipov	½
(India) Vidit Gujrathi	2½
(India) Vidit Gujrathi	2½
(Germany) Frederik Svane	½
(Germany) Frederik Svane	3
Vladimir Kramnik	2
(India) Vidit Gujrathi	2½
(Slovenia) Vladimir Fedoseev	2½
(Slovenia) Vladimir Fedoseev	2½
(Vietnam) Lê Tuấn Minh	1½
(Slovenia) Vladimir Fedoseev	2½	(India) Vidit Gujrathi	2	0
(United States) Hikaru Nakamura	1½	Alexander Grischuk	3	2
(United States) Hikaru Nakamura	2½
(Romania) Bogdan-Daniel Deac	1½
Lower round 1	Lower round 2	Lower round 3	Lower round 4	Lower round 5	Lower final
(United States) Hikaru Nakamura	1½
(France) Jules Moussard	1
(United States) Grigoriy Oparin	1	Maxim Matlakov	½
(United States) Hikaru Nakamura	2	(United States) Hikaru Nakamura	2
Maxim Matlakov	2
(Azerbaijan) Vasif Durarbayli	0	Alexander Grischuk	2
(Germany) Frederik Svane	1½
(United States) Hikaru Nakamura	2	(United States) Hikaru Nakamura	1
(Spain) Alan Pichot	1	(Azerbaijan) Vasif Durarbayli	1½
(Slovenia) Vladimir Fedoseev	1
(Azerbaijan) Vasif Durarbayli	2
(United States) Levon Aronian	1
(Slovenia) Vladimir Fedoseev	2
(FIDE) Mikhail Antipov	½	Vladimir Kramnik	2
Vladimir Kramnik	1½	Vladimir Kramnik	0
Vladimir Kramnik	1½
(India) Karthikeyan Murali	½
(India) Karthikeyan Murali	1½
(Vietnam) Lê Tuấn Minh	1½	(Vietnam) Lê Tuấn Minh	½
(Romania) Bogdan-Daniel Deac	½

Division III Play-off

Round 1	Round 2	Round 3	Round 4	Round 5	Final
(FIDE) David Paravyan	3
(Poland) Maciej Klekowski	1	(FIDE) David Paravyan	3
(Hungary) Tamás Bánusz	0	(Uzbekistan) Jakhongir Vakhidov	2
(Uzbekistan) Jakhongir Vakhidov	3	(FIDE) David Paravyan	1½
(Netherlands) Benjamin Bok	2½	(India) Arjun Erigaisi	2½
(Uruguay) Georg Meier	1½	(Netherlands) Benjamin Bok	½
(India) Arjun Erigaisi	2½	(India) Arjun Erigaisi	2½
(Azerbaijan) Read Samadov	½	(India) Arjun Erigaisi	2½
(Ukraine) Olexandr Bortnyk	2½	Daniil Dubov	1½
(Serbia) Velimir Ivić	½	(Ukraine) Olexandr Bortnyk	3
(United States) Gata Kamsky	1	(India) P. Iniyan	1
(India) P. Iniyan	3	(Ukraine) Olexandr Bortnyk	1½
(Netherlands) Erwin l'Ami	3	Daniil Dubov	2½
Alexey Dreev	0	(Netherlands) Erwin l'Ami	1½
(Poland) Kamil Dragun	1½	Daniil Dubov	2½
Daniil Dubov	2½	(India) Arjun Erigaisi	2½
(Armenia) Shant Sargsyan	3	(Israel) Evgeny Alekseev	1½
(Uzbekistan) Javokhir Sindarov	2	(Armenia) Shant Sargsyan	2½
(Austria) Felix Blohberger	½	(Spain) Jaime Santos Latasa	1½
(Spain) Jaime Santos Latasa	2½	(Armenia) Shant Sargsyan	½
(Uzbekistan) Shamsiddin Vokhidov	0	(Spain) David Antón Guijarro	2½
(Germany) Rasmus Svane	3	(Germany) Rasmus Svane	1½
(Spain) David Antón Guijarro	2½	(Spain) David Antón Guijarro	2½
(FIDE) Rudik Makarian	2½	(Spain) David Antón Guijarro	2
Denis Lazavik	½	(Israel) Evgeny Alekseev	3
(Ukraine) Yuriy Kuzubov	2½	(Ukraine) Yuriy Kuzubov	2
(Israel) Evgeny Alekseev	2½	(Israel) Evgeny Alekseev	3
(Hungary) Benjámin Gledura	1½	(Israel) Evgeny Alekseev	3	(India) Arjun Erigaisi	2½
(India) Abhimanyu Puranik	2½	(India) Abhimanyu Puranik	0	(Israel) Evgeny Alekseev	½
(Armenia) Aram Hakobyan	1½	(India) Abhimanyu Puranik	3
(Netherlands) Thomas Beerdsen	3	(Netherlands) Thomas Beerdsen	0
(India) Pranav V	0
Lower round 1	Lower round 2	Lower round 3	Lower round 4	Lower round 5	Lower round 6	Lower round 7	Lower round 8
(Poland) Maciej Klekowski	2	(Netherlands) Thomas Beerdsen	0	(Ukraine) Olexandr Bortnyk	2
(Hungary) Tamás Bánusz	0	(Poland) Maciej Klekowski	2	(Poland) Maciej Klekowski	0	(Uruguay) Georg Meier	0	(Spain) David Antón Guijarro	1
(Uruguay) Georg Meier	2	(Ukraine) Yuriy Kuzubov	1	(Uruguay) Georg Meier	2	(Ukraine) Olexandr Bortnyk	½	(Spain) Jaime Santos Latasa	2
(Azerbaijan) Read Samadov	0	(Uruguay) Georg Meier	2	(Spain) Jaime Santos Latasa	1½
(Serbia) Velimir Ivić	1½	(Germany) Rasmus Svane	1	(FIDE) David Paravyan	½	(Israel) Evgeny Alekseev	2
(United States) Gata Kamsky	½	(Serbia) Velimir Ivić	2	(Serbia) Velimir Ivić	1	(Spain) Jaime Santos Latasa	1½	(Spain) Jaime Santos Latasa	½	(Armenia) Shant Sargsyan	1
Alexey Dreev	2	(Spain) Jaime Santos Latasa	2	(Spain) Jaime Santos Latasa	2	(Armenia) Shant Sargsyan	1½
(Poland) Kamil Dragun	1	Alexey Dreev	1
(Uzbekistan) Javokhir Sindarov	2	(Netherlands) Erwin l'Ami	0	(India) Abhimanyu Puranik	0
(Austria) Felix Blohberger	1	(Uzbekistan) Javokhir Sindarov	2	(Uzbekistan) Javokhir Sindarov	2	(Uzbekistan) Javokhir Sindarov	2	Daniil Dubov	0
(Uzbekistan) Shamsiddin Vokhidov	½	(India) P. Iniyan	0	(FIDE) Rudik Makarian	1	(Uzbekistan) Javokhir Sindarov	1	(Armenia) Shant Sargsyan	2
(FIDE) Rudik Makarian	1½	(FIDE) Rudik Makarian	2	(Armenia) Shant Sargsyan	2
Denis Lazavik	1½	(Netherlands) Benjamin Bok	1	(Armenia) Shant Sargsyan	1½
(Hungary) Benjámin Gledura	½	Denis Lazavik	2	Denis Lazavik	1	(Armenia) Aram Hakobyan	½
(Armenia) Aram Hakobyan	2	(Uzbekistan) Jakhongir Vakhidov	½	(Armenia) Aram Hakobyan	2
(India) Pranav V	0	(Armenia) Aram Hakobyan	1½

=== Julius Baer Generation Cup ===
Division I Play-off

Champion Round 1	Champion Round 2	Champion Final	Final
(France) Maxime Vachier-Lagrave	1½
(United States) Levon Aronian	2½
(United States) Levon Aronian	1½
(Norway) Magnus Carlsen	2½
Ian Nepomniachtchi	2
(Norway) Magnus Carlsen	3
(Norway) Magnus Carlsen	2½
(France) Alireza Firouzja	1½
(France) Alireza Firouzja	2½
(Slovenia) Vladimir Fedoseev	1½
(France) Alireza Firouzja	2½
Alexander Grischuk	½
Alexander Grischuk	2½
(India) Arjun Erigaisi	1½	(Norway) Magnus Carlsen	2½
(France) Alireza Firouzja	1½
Elimination Round 1	Elimination Round 2	Elimination Round 3	Elimination Final
Alexander Grischuk	1
(France) Maxime Vachier-Lagrave	1½	(France) Maxime Vachier-Lagrave	2	(France) Alireza Firouzja	2
Ian Nepomniachtchi	½	(France) Maxime Vachier-Lagrave	½	(United States) Levon Aronian	0
(United States) Levon Aronian	1½
(United States) Levon Aronian	2
(Slovenia) Vladimir Fedoseev	1½	(Slovenia) Vladimir Fedoseev	0
(India) Arjun Erigaisi	½

Division II Play-off

Upper round 1	Upper round 2	Upper round 3	Upper final	Final
(India) Vidit Gujrathi	2½
(United States) Ray Robson	1½
(India) Vidit Gujrathi	2½
(Azerbaijan) Vasif Durarbayli	½
(Spain) David Antón Guijarro	2
(Azerbaijan) Vasif Durarbayli	3
(India) Vidit Gujrathi	2
(Mexico) José Martínez	3
(Mexico) José Martínez	2½
(Serbia) Aleksandar Inđić	1½
(Mexico) José Martínez	2½
Denis Lazavik	1½
(United States) Grigoriy Oparin	½
Denis Lazavik	2½
(Mexico) José Martínez	1½
(United States) Wesley So	2½
(United States) Wesley So	2½
(Uzbekistan) Nodirbek Yakubboev	1½
(United States) Wesley So	2½
(Uzbekistan) Mukhiddin Madaminov	½
(Netherlands) Benjamin Bok	1½
(Uzbekistan) Mukhiddin Madaminov	2½
(United States) Wesley So	2½
(Armenia) Shant Sargsyan	½
(Vietnam) Lê Tuấn Minh	1½
(Armenia) Shant Sargsyan	2½
(Armenia) Shant Sargsyan	2½	(United States) Wesley So	3
(Iran) Bardiya Daneshvar	1½	Denis Lazavik	2
(Ukraine) Olexandr Bortnyk	1
(Iran) Bardiya Daneshvar	3
Lower round 1	Lower round 2	Lower round 3	Lower round 4	Lower round 5	Lower final
(Iran) Bardiya Daneshvar	1½
(India) Vidit Gujrathi	2
(United States) Ray Robson	1	(Spain) David Antón Guijarro	½
(Iran) Bardiya Daneshvar	1	(Serbia) Aleksandar Inđić	0
(Spain) David Antón Guijarro	2
(Serbia) Aleksandar Inđić	2	(Mexico) José Martínez	½
(Uzbekistan) Mukhiddin Madaminov	½
(India) Vidit Gujrathi	1	Denis Lazavik	1½
(Serbia) Aleksandar Inđić	2	(Serbia) Aleksandar Inđić	1½
Denis Lazavik	2
(United States) Grigoriy Oparin	0
Denis Lazavik	1½
(Armenia) Shant Sargsyan	0
(Uzbekistan) Nodirbek Yakubboev	0	(Netherlands) Benjamin Bok	½
Denis Lazavik	1½	Denis Lazavik	2
(Netherlands) Benjamin Bok	2
(Ukraine) Olexandr Bortnyk	½
(Azerbaijan) Vasif Durarbayli	1
(Vietnam) Lê Tuấn Minh	0	(Ukraine) Olexandr Bortnyk	2
(Ukraine) Olexandr Bortnyk	2

Division III Play-off

Round 1	Round 2	Round 3	Round 4	Round 5	Final
(Spain) Jaime Santos Latasa	2½
(Armenia) Gabriel Sargissian	½	(Spain) Jaime Santos Latasa	1½
(Germany) Vincent Keymer	3	(Germany) Vincent Keymer	2½
(Armenia) Aram Hakobyan	0	(Germany) Vincent Keymer	3
(Greece) Nikolas Theodorou	3	(Greece) Nikolas Theodorou	0
(Germany) Frederik Svane	2	(Greece) Nikolas Theodorou	2½
(FIDE) Rudik Makarian	2½	(FIDE) Rudik Makarian	1½
(Turkey) Mustafa Yılmaz	2½	(Germany) Vincent Keymer	½
(Armenia) Haik M. Martirosyan	1	(United States) Fabiano Caruana	2½
(United States) Fabiano Caruana	3	(United States) Fabiano Caruana	3
(Austria) Kirill Alekseenko	2½	(Austria) Kirill Alekseenko	0
(Poland) Jan-Krzysztof Duda	2½	(United States) Fabiano Caruana	2½
(Azerbaijan) Gadir Guseinov	1	(India) Bharath Subramaniyam	½
(India) Bharath Subramaniyam	3	(India) Bharath Subramaniyam	3
(Czech Republic) David Navara	2½	(Czech Republic) David Navara	2
(Egypt) Bassem Amin	2½	(United States) Fabiano Caruana	2½
(Israel) Boris Gelfand	2½	(France) Jules Moussard	½
(Serbia) Alexandr Predke	½	(Israel) Boris Gelfand	2½
(Ukraine) Anton Korobov	2½	(Ukraine) Anton Korobov	2½
Pavel Ponkratov	1½	(Ukraine) Anton Korobov	3
(United States) Gata Kamsky	3	(Uzbekistan) Javokhir Sindarov	0
Andrey Esipenko	1	(United States) Gata Kamsky	1½
(FIDE) Mikhail Kobalia	½	(Uzbekistan) Javokhir Sindarov	2½
(Uzbekistan) Javokhir Sindarov	2½	(Ukraine) Anton Korobov	½
(Romania) Bogdan-Daniel Deac	2½	(France) Jules Moussard	2½
(United States) Christopher Yoo	2½	(United States) Christopher Yoo	3
(United States) Hans Niemann	2½	(United States) Hans Niemann	2
(Serbia) Alexey Sarana	1½	(United States) Christopher Yoo	1	(United States) Fabiano Caruana	2½
(India) Pranav V	0	(France) Jules Moussard	3	(Germany) Vincent Keymer	½
(France) Jules Moussard	3	(France) Jules Moussard	3
(Croatia) Marin Bosiočić	1	(Germany) Rasmus Svane	1
(Germany) Rasmus Svane	3
Lower round 1	Lower round 2	Lower round 3	Lower round 4	Lower round 5	Lower round 6	Lower round 7	Lower round 8
(Armenia) Gabriel Sargissian	1	(Germany) Rasmus Svane	0	(India) Bharath Subramaniyam	1
(Armenia) Aram Hakobyan	2	(Armenia) Aram Hakobyan	2	(Armenia) Aram Hakobyan	½	(United States) Hans Niemann	2	(Ukraine) Anton Korobov	½
(Germany) Frederik Svane	2	(United States) Hans Niemann	2	(United States) Hans Niemann	1½	(United States) Hans Niemann	1½	(Israel) Boris Gelfand	1½
(Turkey) Mustafa Yılmaz	1	(Germany) Frederik Svane	1	(Israel) Boris Gelfand	1½
(Armenia) Haik M. Martirosyan	2	(United States) Gata Kamsky	2	(Greece) Nikolas Theodorou	0	(France) Jules Moussard	½
(Poland) Jan-Krzysztof Duda	0	(Armenia) Haik M. Martirosyan	1	(United States) Gata Kamsky	1	(Israel) Boris Gelfand	2	(Israel) Boris Gelfand	1	(Germany) Vincent Keymer	1½
(Azerbaijan) Gadir Guseinov	½	(Israel) Boris Gelfand	1½	(Israel) Boris Gelfand	2	(Germany) Vincent Keymer	2
(Egypt) Bassem Amin	1½	(Egypt) Bassem Amin	½
(Serbia) Alexandr Predke	1½	(Czech Republic) David Navara	1½	(United States) Christopher Yoo	1½
Pavel Ponkratov	½	(Serbia) Alexandr Predke	½	(Czech Republic) David Navara	2	(Czech Republic) David Navara	½	(Germany) Vincent Keymer	1½
Andrey Esipenko	1½	(Austria) Kirill Alekseenko	2	(Austria) Kirill Alekseenko	1	(United States) Christopher Yoo	½	(Uzbekistan) Javokhir Sindarov	½
(FIDE) Mikhail Kobalia	½	Andrey Esipenko	0	(Uzbekistan) Javokhir Sindarov	1½
(Romania) Bogdan-Daniel Deac	1½	(FIDE) Rudik Makarian	1½	(Uzbekistan) Javokhir Sindarov	1½
(Serbia) Alexey Sarana	½	(Romania) Bogdan-Daniel Deac	1½	(FIDE) Rudik Makarian	2	(FIDE) Rudik Makarian	½
(India) Pranav V	0	(Spain) Jaime Santos Latasa	0	(Croatia) Marin Bosiočić	1
(Croatia) Marin Bosiočić	2	(Croatia) Marin Bosiočić	2

=== Tour Finals ===
==== Round-robin stage ====
Champion Chess Tour Finals, round-robin stage, 17 – 19 December 2024, Oslo, Norway
	Player	Rating	1	2	3	4	5	6	7	8	MP	H2H
1	Magnus Carlsen (Norway)	2838		½ ½ ½	1 ½	1 ½	1 0 ½*	1 ½	1 ½	0 1 1	6	
2	Alireza Firouzja (France)	2756	½ ½ ½*		½ 1	1 0 ½	1 ½	½ 1	1 ½	0 0	5	1
3	Ian Nepomniachtchi (FIDE)	2758	0 ½	½ 0		1 0 1	½ ½ 1	1 0 1	1 ½	1 ½	5	0
4	Denis Lazavik (FIDE)	2553	0 ½	0 1 ½*	0 1 0		½ 1	½ ½ 1	1 0 0	1 ½	4	
5	Maxime Vachier-Lagrave (France)	2763	0 1 ½	0 ½	½ ½ 0	½ 0		1 ½	1 1	½ 0	2	2; 1
6	Vincent Keymer (Germany)	2649	0 ½	½ 0	0 1 0	½ ½ 0	0 ½		½ 1	0 1 ½*	2	2; 0
7	Levon Aronian (USA)	2757	0 ½	0 ½	0 ½	0 1 1	0 0	½ 0		1 1	2	1; 1
8	Wesley So (USA)	2739	1 0 0	1 1	0 ½	0 ½	½ 1	1 0 ½	0 0		2	1; 0

* - Match win by drawing armageddon game with black

==== Survival stage ====
3rd-4th place match
	Player	1	2
3	(FIDE) Ian Nepomniachtchi	½	1
4	(FIDE) Denis Lazavik	½	0

5th-6th place match
	Player	1	2
5	(France) Maxime Vachier-Lagrave	1	1
6	(Germany) Vincent Keymer	0	0

4th-5th place match
	Player	1	2
4	(FIDE) Denis Lazavik	½	0
5	(France) Maxime Vachier-Lagrave	½	1

==== Semifinals and finals ====
Semifinals
1	(Norway) Magnus Carlsen	3½
5	(France) Maxime Vachier-Lagrave	1½
2	(France) Alireza Firouzja	½
3	(FIDE) Ian Nepomniachtchi	3½

Final
1	(Norway) Magnus Carlsen	4
3	(FIDE) Ian Nepomniachtchi	1

Semifinal 1
	Player	1	2	3	4	5
1	(Norway) Magnus Carlsen	1	0	1	½	1
5	(France) Maxime Vachier-Lagrave	0	1	0	½	0

Semifinal 2
	Player	1	2	3	4
2	(France) Alireza Firouzja	0	0	½	0
3	(FIDE) Ian Nepomniachtchi	1	1	½	1

Final
	Player	1	2	3	4	5
1	(Norway) Magnus Carlsen	1	1	½	½	1
3	(FIDE) Ian Nepomniachtchi	0	0	½	½	0
