= Aeroflot Open =

Russian chess tournament

Tournament information
- Location: The Carlton Moscow, Moscow, Russia
- Dates: 28 February–5 March 2026
- Format: 9-round Swiss tournament
- Purse: RUB 20,000,000 (2026)

Current champion
- Ian Nepomniachtchi

The Aeroflot Open is an annual open chess tournament organised through the joint efforts of the Chess Federation of Russia and the Russian Ministry of Sport with the sponsorship from the Russian flag carrier, Aeroflot. It is played in Moscow, holding both the international open tournament and the Russian Youth Cup "Aeroflot Open - Children".

Aeroflot Open was established in 2002 as Swiss system tournament with nine rounds, and the winner is invited to the Dortmund chess tournament held later in the same year, a tradition begun in 2003. In 2013, it was converted into a rapid and blitz event. The first event had around 80 grandmasters, while in the second event 150 grandmasters participated. Beside the main tournament (A Group), there are also B and C-class tournaments.

The 2026 edition of this tournament was held from 28 February - 5 March 2026, at The Carlton Moscow in Moscow, Russia. It was won by Ian Nepomniachtchi.

== Winners ==
The name of the winner is boldfaced as in some editions, a few players ended with the same overall score.

#	Year	Winner(s)	Points	Rounds
1	2002	**Gregory Kaidanov (USA)**; Alexander Grischuk (RUS); Aleksej Aleksandrov (BLR); Alexander Shabalov (USA); Vadim Milov (SUI)	6½	9
2	2003	**Viorel Bologan (MDA)**; Aleksej Aleksandrov (BLR); Alexei Fedorov (BLR); Peter Svidler (RUS)	7	9
3	2004	**Sergei Rublevsky (RUS)**; Rafael Vaganian (ARM); Valerij Filippov (RUS)	7	9
4	2005	**Emil Sutovsky (ISR)**; Andrei Kharlov (RUS); Vassily Ivanchuk (UKR); Alexander Motylev (RUS); Vladimir Akopian (ARM)	6½	9
5	2006	**Baadur Jobava (GEO)**; Viorel Bologan (MDA); Krishnan Sasikiran (IND); Shakhriyar Mamedyarov (AZE)	6½	9
6	2007	**Evgeny Alekseev (RUS)**	7	9
7	2008	**Ian Nepomniachtchi (RUS)**	7	9
8	2009	**Étienne Bacrot (FRA)**; Alexander Moiseenko (UKR)	6½	9
9	2010	**Lê Quang Liêm (VIE)**	7	9
10	2011	**Lê Quang Liêm (VIE)**; Nikita Vitiugov (RUS); Evgeny Tomashevsky (RUS)	6½	9
11	2012	**Mateusz Bartel (POL)**; Anton Korobov (UKR); Pavel Eljanov (UKR)	6½	9
12	2013	**Sergey Karjakin (RUS)** (Rapid tournament); **Ian Nepomniachtchi (RUS)** (Blitz tournament)	2–1; 15½	K.O. 18
13	2015	**Ian Nepomniachtchi (RUS)**; Daniil Dubov (RUS)	7	9
14	2016	**Evgeniy Najer (RUS)**; Boris Gelfand (ISR)	6½	9
15	2017	**Vladimir Fedoseev (RUS)**	7	9
16	2018	**Vladislav Kovalev (BLR)**	7	9
17	2019	**Kaido Külaots (EST)**; Haik Martirosyan (ARM)	7	9
18	2020	**Aydin Suleymanli (AZE)**; Rinat Jumabayev (KAZ); Rauf Mamedov (AZE); Aravindh Chithambaram (IND)	6½	9
19	2024	**Amin Tabatabaei (IRN)**	7½	9
20	2025	**Ian Nepomniachtchi (FIDE)**	7	9
21	2026	**Ian Nepomniachtchi (FIDE)**	7½	9

== Results ==
=== 2024 ===
Aeroflot Open was included in the 2024 FIDE Circuit.

Ties were broken first according to the number of games played with the black pieces, then the average rating of the player's opponents, excluding the highest and the lowest.

Nine rounds were played; the top 20 players of this event were:

Rank	Seed	Player	Points	TB 1	TB 2
1	4	(Iran) GM Amin Tabatabaei	7.5	4	2521
2	2	(FIDE) GM Andrey Esipenko	6.5	5	2532
3	6	(Uzbekistan) GM Nodirbek Yakubboev	6.5	5	2512
4	5	(Armenia) GM Haik Martirosyan	6.5	4	2480
5	19	(Belarus) GM Denis Lazavik	6.5	4	2480
6	24	(Russia) GM Sergey Drygalov	6	5	2505
7	8	(Armenia) GM Manuel Petrosyan	6	5	2457
8	14	(FIDE) GM Arseniy Nesterov	6	5	2435
9	10	(FIDE) GM David Paravyan	6	5	2428
10	16	(Russia) GM Vadim Zvjaginsev	6	5	2408
11	42	(Russia) GM Aleksey Goganov	6	5	2387
12	1	(Russia) GM Alexander Grischuk	6	4	2569
13	55	(Russia) IM Yaroslav Remizov	6	4	2545
14	83	(Russia) FM Alexey Grachev	6	4	2488
15	26	(FIDE) IM Aleksey Grebnev	6	5	2482
16	7	(Armenia) GM Samvel Ter-Sahakyan	6	4	2479
17	11	(Azerbaijan) GM Aydin Suleymanli	6	4	2468
18	45	(Kazakhstan) IM Kazybek Nogerbek	6	4	2413
19	27	(Belarus) GM Mihail Nikitenko	6	4	2391
20	91	(Russia) IM Kirill Klukin	5.5	5	2519

=== 2025 ===
Aeroflot Open was included in the 2025 FIDE Circuit.

Ties were broken first according to the number of games played with the black pieces, then the average rating of the player's opponents, excluding the highest and the lowest.

Nine rounds were played; the top 20 players of this event were:

Rank	Seed	Player	Points	TB 1	TB 2
1	1	(Russia) GM Ian Nepomniachtchi	7	5	2557
2	3	(Hungary) GM Richard Rapport	6.5	5	2550
3	5	(FIDE) GM Andrey Esipenko	6.5	5	2510
4	15	(Russia) GM Maxim Matlakov	6.5	5	2460
5	34	(FIDE) GM Sergei Lobanov	6.5	5	2423
6	9	(Iran) GM Amin Tabatabaei	6.5	5	2403
7	43	(Russia) GM Aleksey Goganov	6.5	4	2630
8	2	(United States) GM Hans Niemann	6.5	4	2565
9	18	(Iran) GM Bardiya Daneshvar	6.5	4	2482
10	29	(FIDE) GM Savva Vetokhin	6	5	2538
11	25	(Russia) GM Ivan Zemlyanskii	6	5	2527
12	31	(FIDE) GM Ilia Iljiushenok	6	5	2408
13	23	(Russia) GM Pavel Ponkratov	6	5	2370
14	13	(Armenia) GM Aram Hakobyan	6	4	2518
15	7	(Russia) GM Alexander Grischuk	6	4	2503
16	10	(India) GM Raunak Sadhwani	6	4	2494
17	4	(Russia) GM Daniil Dubov	6	4	2488
18	6	(Russia) GM Vladislav Artemiev	6	4	2473
19	117	(Russia) FM Maksim Volkov	6	4	2453
20	20	(FIDE) GM Arseniy Nesterov	6	4	2445

=== 2026 ===
Aeroflot Open was included in the 2026–2027 FIDE Circuit.

Ties were broken first according to the number of games played with the black pieces, then the average rating of the player's opponents, excluding the highest and the lowest.

Nine rounds were played; the top 20 players of this event were:

Rank	Seed	Player	Points	TB 1	TB 2
1	1	(Russia) GM Ian Nepomniachtchi	7.5	5	2494
2	19	(FIDE) GM David Paravyan	6.5	5	2517
3	30	(FIDE) GM Rudik Makarian	6.5	5	2467
4	7	(Armenia) GM Haik M. Martirosyan	6.5	5	2451
5	17	(Iran) GM Bardiya Daneshvar	6.5	5	2426
6	21	(Russia) GM Aleksandr Shimanov	6.5	5	2426
7	62	(Uzbekistan) IM Mukhammadzokhid Suyarov	6.5	4	2586
8	74	(Kazakhstan) IM Sauat Nurgaliyev	6.5	4	2563
9	2	(Russia) GM Andrey Esipenko	6.5	4	2516
10	20	(Azerbaijan) GM Mahammad Muradli	6.5	4	2516
11	8	(FIDE) GM Aleksey Grebnev	6.5	4	2501
12	16	(FIDE) GM Arseniy Nesterov	6.5	4	2495
13	10	(Armenia) GM Aram Hakobyan	6.5	4	2483
14	6	(India) GM Raunak Sadhwani	6.5	4	2481
15	32	(FIDE) GM Artem Uskov	6.5	4	2458
16	28	(Russia) GM Vadim Zvjaginsev	6.5	4	2399
17	5	(Russia) GM Alexander Grischuk	6	5	2486
18	41	(Singapore) GM Siddharth Jagadeesh	6	5	2433
19	29	(Russia) GM Nikita Afanasiev	6	5	2389
20	45	(Russia) GM Boris Savchenko	6	4	2532

== Sources ==
- Reports from Chessbase: 2002, 2003, 2004, 2005, 2006, 2007, 2008, 2009, 2010, 2013 blitz, 2013 rapid final
- Results from TWIC: 2002, 2003, 2004, 2005, 2006, 2007, 2008, 2009, 2010
- On the 2002 edition from ruchess.com 2002
