= Vladislav Kovalev =

Belarusian chess grandmaster (born 1994)

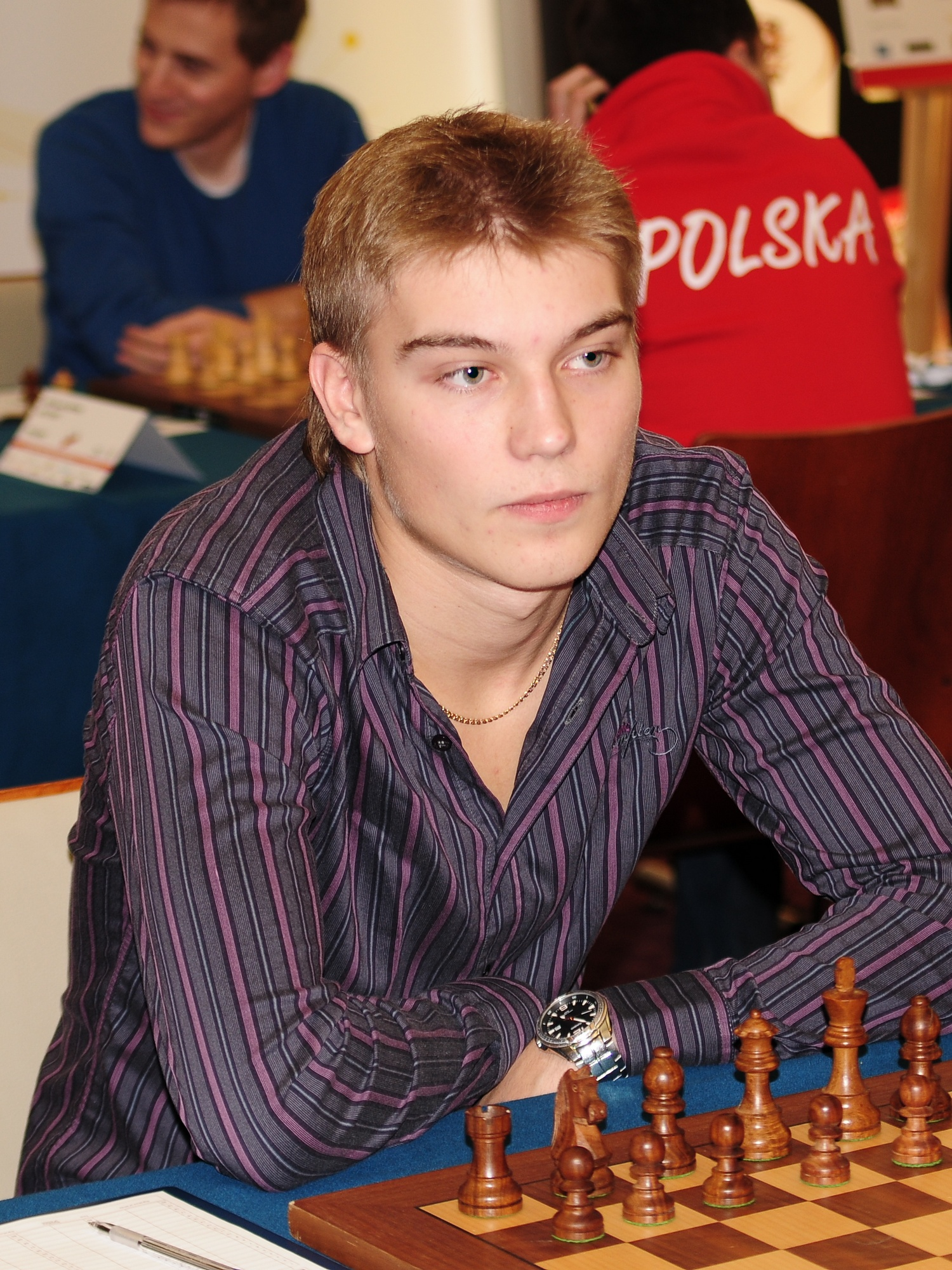
- Kovalev in 2013

Personal information
- Born: Vladislav Vladimirovich Kovalev; 6 January 1994 (age 32) Minsk, Belarus

Chess career
- Country: Belarus (until 2021); FIDE (since 2021)
- Title: Grandmaster (2013)
- FIDE rating: 2565 (July 2026)
- Peak rating: 2703 (February 2019)
- Peak ranking: No. 40 (February 2019)

Vladislav Vladimirovich Kovalev (Russian: Владислав Владимирович Ковалёв; born 6 January 1994) is a Belarusian chess player who holds the FIDE title of Grandmaster. He was Belarusian Chess Champion in 2016.

== Chess career ==
Born in 1994, Kovalev won the Belarusian Junior Chess Championship in 2009, 2011 and 2012. He represented Belarus at the European Youth Chess Championship and World Youth Chess Championship, in which he won two medals: silver at the 2008 European U14 Chess Championship and bronze at the 2010 European U16 Chess Championship.

Kovalev was awarded the International Master (IM) title in 2012, and he received his Grandmaster (GM) title the following year.

In 2013, he shared first place in the Ilmar Raud memorial in Viljandi.

Kovalev has represented Belarus in four Chess Olympiads: In 2012, he scored 2½/5 (+1–1=3) on the reserve board at the 40th Chess Olympiad in Istanbul; in 2014, he scored 5/8 (+3–1=4) on fourth board at the 41st Chess Olympiad in Tromsø; in 2016, he scored 5/8 (+3–1=4) on second board at the 42nd Chess Olympiad in Baku; in 2018, he scored 6/9 (+4–1=4) on first board at the 43rd Chess Olympiad in Batumi.

He has also played for Belarus in two European Team Chess Championships: in 2013, he scored 3/8 (+2–4=2) on third board at the 19th European Team Chess Championship in Warsaw; in 2017, he scored 4½/8 (+3–2=3) on second board at the 21st European Team Chess Championship in Hersonissos.

Kovalev won the Belarusian Chess Championship in 2016. In 2017, he won the Liepājas Rokāde Open tournament.

In February 2018, Kovalev competed in the Aeroflot Open. He finished first, half a point ahead of his nearest competitors, with a score of 7/9 (+5–0=4). He thus qualified for the 46th Dortmund Sparkassen Chess Meeting in July, where he placed third with a score of 4/7 (+1–0=6).

In January 2019, he competed in the Tata Steel Challengers. He scored 10/13 (+7–0=6) to take first place, one-and-a-half points ahead of Andrey Esipenko, Benjámin Gledura and Maksim Chigaev, who all tied for second. By winning the Challengers he qualified for the 2020 Tata Steel Masters tournament, in which he scored 4/13 (+1–6=6).

As of September 2023, Kovalev does not hold a national chess federation membership. Instead, his federation is listed as "FIDE", and he entered the FIDE Grand Swiss Tournament 2021 with this affiliation.
