= Vitaliy Bernadskiy =

Ukrainian chess grandmaster (born 1994)

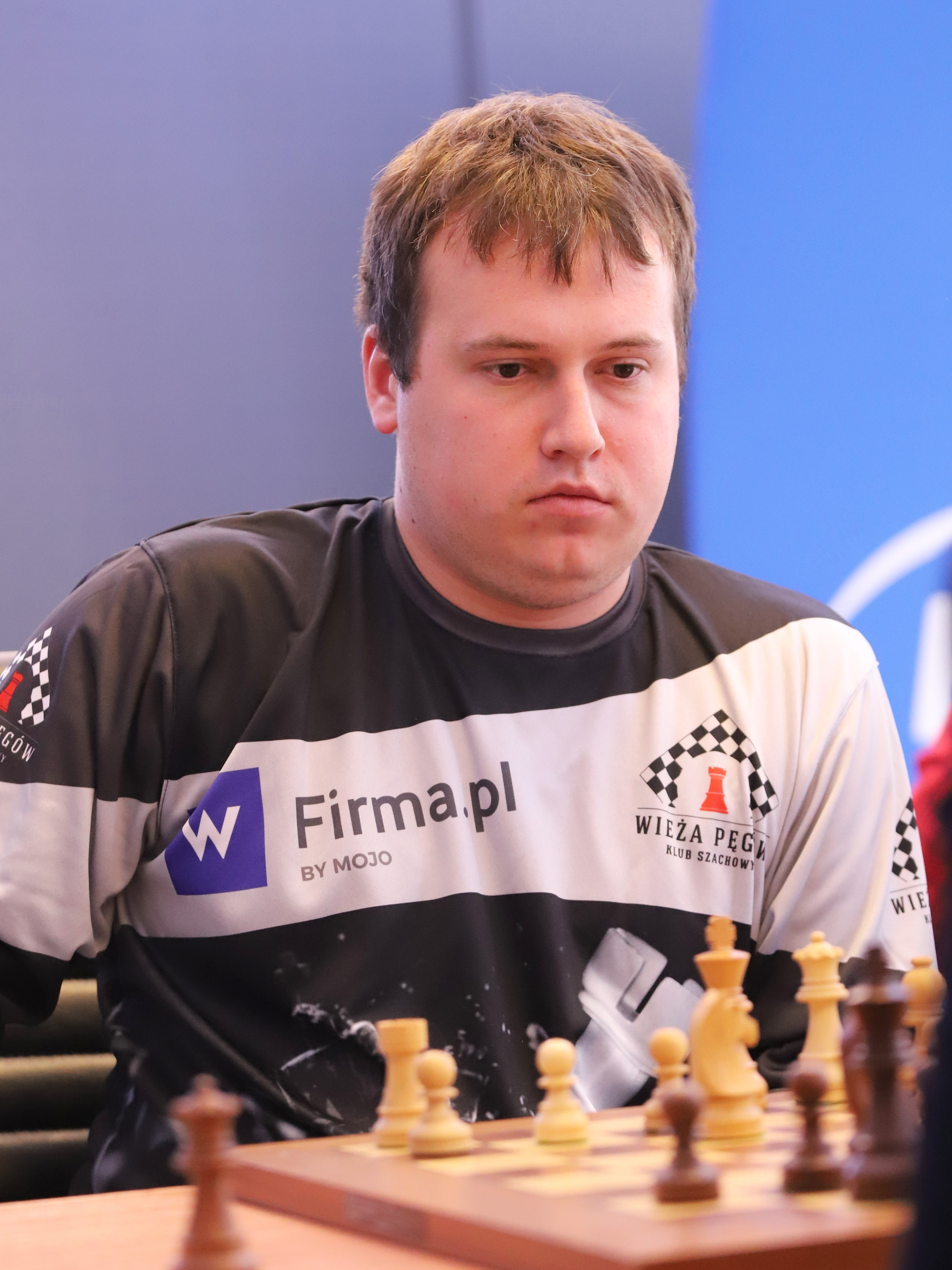
- Vitaliy Bernadskiy, Bydgoszcz 2022

Personal information
- Born: 17 October 1994 (age 31) Chernivtsi, Ukraine

Chess career
- Country: Ukraine
- Title: Grandmaster (2014)
- FIDE rating: 2507 (July 2026)
- Peak rating: 2636 (May 2022)

Vitaliy Olegovich Bernadskiy (born October 17, 1994) is a Ukrainian chess grandmaster (2014).

== Chess achievements ==
In 2011, Bernadskiy won the 2nd Brno Open with a score of 8.5/9 In 2012, he tied first in the 11th Kesarovski-Stanchev Memorial with Petar Drenchev, Tamir Nabaty, Golubka Petr, Enchev Ivajlo, and Vasil Spasov. In 2013, he tied 2nd- 5th places in the Grand Europe Albena Open with Mircea-Emilian Parligras, Hrant Melkumyan, and Tamir Nabaty.

In 2015, Bernadskiy tied first in the 14th Kesarovski-Stanchev Memorial with Vasil Spasov, Spas Kozhuharov, and Viacheslav Tilicheev. In 2017, he won first place in the Albena Open with a score of 8.5/9.

In December 2020, Bernadskiy won the 5th Vergani Cup. In May 2021, he won the Cattolica Summer Open GM Mix with a score of 7/9. In March 2022, he won the Festival Primavera Cattolica tournament after a tie-break with Arseniy Nesterov, Marin Bosiocic, Emin Ohanyan, Evan Park, and Radoslav Dimitrov.

Bernadskiy is ranked 313th chess player in the world, and 24th in Ukraine (as of October 2022) His highest rating was 2636 in May 2022.
