= Emin Ohanyan =

Armenian chess grandmaster (born 2006)

Personal information
- Born: September 20, 2006 (age 20) Yerevan, Armenia

Chess career
- Country: Armenia
- Title: Grandmaster (2023)
- FIDE rating: 2520 (October 2026)
- Peak rating: 2539 (November 2026)

Emin Ohanyan is an Armenian chess grandmaster.

== Chess career ==
In March 2022, he won the Festival Primavera Cattolica tournament after a tie-break with Arseniy Nesterov, Marin Bosiočić, Vitaliy Bernadskiy, Evan Park, and Radoslav Dimitrov.

In July 2023, he won the Qualifier 1 Losers Brackets by defeating Renato Terry, and qualified for the 2023 Bullet Chess Championships on chess.com.

In June 2024, he won the silver medal in the U20 World Junior Chess Championships. Later in that month, he was part of the Armenian team who won the silver medal in the U18 European Team Championships.
