= Read Samadov =

Azerbaijani chess player (born 2007)

Personal information
- Born: 2007 (age 18–19)

Chess career
- Country: Azerbaijan
- Title: International Master (2023)
- FIDE rating: 2524 (October 2026)
- Peak rating: 2529 (November 2026)

Read Samadov is an Azerbaijani chess player.

== Chess career ==
In February 2025, he tied for first place at the Chessable Masters Qualifier, losing the title to Saparmyrat Atabayev after tiebreaks.

In March 2025, he tied for fourth place with eight grandmasters (including Daniil Yuffa and Benjamin Gledura) at the European Chess Championship. Through this finish, he qualified to play in the Chess World Cup 2025. At the World Cup, he was defeated by Lorenzo Lodici in the first round.
