= Andrey Drygalov =

Russian chess grandmaster (born 1999)

Personal information
- Born: May 19, 1999 (age 27) Kurgan, Russia

Chess career
- Country: Russia
- Title: Grandmaster (2021)
- FIDE rating: 2404 (July 2026)
- Peak rating: 2522 (August 2021)

Andrey Maksimovich Drygalov is a Russian chess grandmaster.

== Chess career ==
In July 2015, he finished third in the Chelyabinsk Region Blitz Championship. He placed behind winner Pavel Ponkratov and runner-up Igor Lysyj, and finished alongside Roman Ovechkin.

In August 2017, he played for Kurgan in the Russian Youth Team Championship. He helped his team in defeating the Moscow team.

In July 2018, he finished third in the Lev Polugaevsky Memorial held in Samara. He finished behind winner Alexey Mokshanov and runner-up Evgeny Shaposhnikov.

In April 2019, he finished third in the Russian Junior U21 Championship, behind his brother Sergey and Semen Khanin.

In October 2019, he played for the Regulars team with Maxim Lugovskoy, Oleg Vastrukhin, and Alexander Utnasynov in the Russian Rapid Team Championships. The team finished second behind the Moscow Chess Team.

== Personal life ==
His twin brother Sergey Drygalov is also a grandmaster.
