= Bharath Subramaniyam =

Indian chess grandmaster (born 2007)

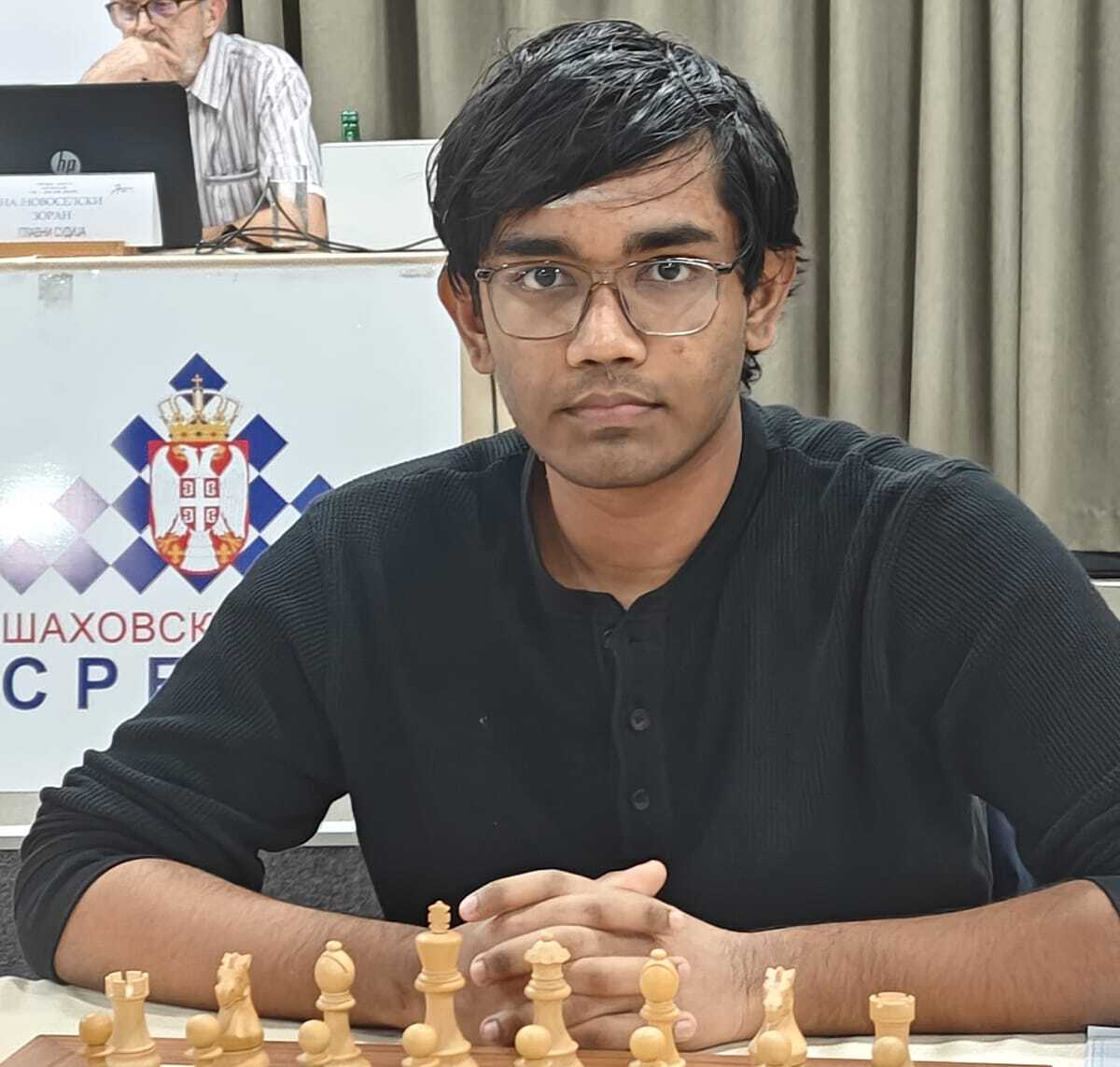
- Bharath at a chess tournament

Personal information
- Born: 17 October 2007 (age 19) Chennai, India

Chess career
- Country: India
- Title: Grandmaster (2022)
- FIDE rating: 2603 (October 2026)
- Peak rating: 2605 (September 2026)

Bharath Subramaniyam Harishankkar (born 17 October 2007) is an Indian chess grandmaster (GM).

== Chess career ==
Bharath learned chess at the age of five from his father, Harishankkar. Starting in 2014, he attended the Chess Gurukul school in Chennai, having GM Ramachandran Ramesh as his main teacher. In January 2020, Bharath was selected for a special training camp sponsored by Microsense Networks and conducted by former world champion GM Vladimir Kramnik and former world chess challenger GM Boris Gelfand.

He completed his 3rd IM norm in June 2019 at the age of 11 years and 8 months. The title was officially ratified by FIDE in September of the same year.

In January 2022, Bharath earned his third and final GM norm to become India's 73rd grandmaster at the age of 14 by scoring 7.5/9 at the Vergani Cup Open in Cattolica, Italy, and raising his live rating above 2500. Bharath currently studies in Saint Louis University,Missouri and represents the university in national and international events.

== Main results ==
- 2015 – in August he wins at Suwon (Korea) the Asian Youth Championship in the Under-8 section.
  In November he wins the World Youth Championship Under-8 at Porto Carras in Greece with 9,5/ 11;
- 2017 – in August he places 4th in the World Youth Championship Under-10 at Poços de Caldas in Brazil.
- 2019 - In June he achieves his final IM norm in Goa open and becomes International master.
- 2020 – in February he places 11th at the Aeroflot Open in Moscow with 5,5/ 9, ahead of 54 Grandmasters and getting his first GM norm with a rating performance greater than 2700.
- 2021 – in October he is placed 4th (tied for 3rd) at the Junior Roundtable Under 21 tournament in Bulgaria with 6.5/9. He made his 2nd GM norm.
- 2024 - in Feb won the Cannes chess open held in France.
- 2025 – in July he won the 53rd World Open chess tournament held at Philadelphia and won the first prize of $20500 becoming the youngest ever to win the tournament at 17 years.
- 2025 - In December he won the VIth Elllobregat open chess tournament held in Spain and won the first prize of 5000 Euros with a rating performance of ELO 2685.
- 2025 - In December he tied for the 1st place in Wroclaw chess festival in Poland.
- 2026 - In April he was the joint winner in the Atlantic City Chess open in Atlantic City USA with a rating performance of 2660.
- 2026 - In August he won the Granada chess open held in Granada Spain
