= Mykola Bortnyk =

Ukrainian chess player (born 1994)

Personal information
- Born: January 13, 1994 (age 32) Oleksandrivka, Mykolaiv Oblast, Ukraine

Chess career
- Country: Ukraine
- Title: International Master (2014)
- FIDE rating: 2451 (November 2026)
- Peak rating: 2504 (February 2020)

Twitch information
- Channel: MykolaChess
- Years active: 2022–present
- Followers: 1450
- Last updated: September 17, 2026

Mykola Mykolayovych Bortnyk (Ukrainian: Микола Миколайович Бортник; born January 13, 1994) is a Ukrainian chess player who has a peak FIDE rating of 2504 in classical, 2595 in rapid, and 2665 in blitz. He is a 2-time winner of the Marshall Chess Club Chess Championship.

== Chess career ==
Mykola has won multiple Youth Championships in his native Ukraine – the Under 10, 18 and 20 championships, he was also the rapid and blitz champion of Ukraine as well as placing 9th in the 2015 European Blitz Chess Championship.

In December 2020, he made it to the finals round of the Chess.com Bullet Open Championship.

In September 2022, he finished second in the late Titled Tuesday tournament. He had tied with grandmaster Dmitry Andreikin for first place, but was placed second after tiebreak scores.

In March 2023, he played for the Gotham Knights in the Pro Chess League, where he notably defeated grandmaster Ju Wenjun in the second round. The Gotham Knights went on to win the 2023 Pro Chess League, led by Hikaru Nakamura.

In August 2023, he finished in 5th place in the first Bullet Brawl of the month.

In December 2024, Bortnyk finished 12th in the FIDE Open Blitz Chess Championship, after finishing with 3 consecutive wins. In this tournament, he defeated many strong 2700+ GMs, including Le Quang Liem, Jeffery Xiong, Anish Giri, and drew with 2700+ GM Wei Yi. Ultimately, he finished with a strong score of 9/13, and finished just out of the tie for first place.

== Personal life ==
His younger brother is grandmaster Olexandr Bortnyk, whom he has encountered in several online tournaments held on chess.com.
