= David Paravyan =

Russian chess grandmaster (born 1998)

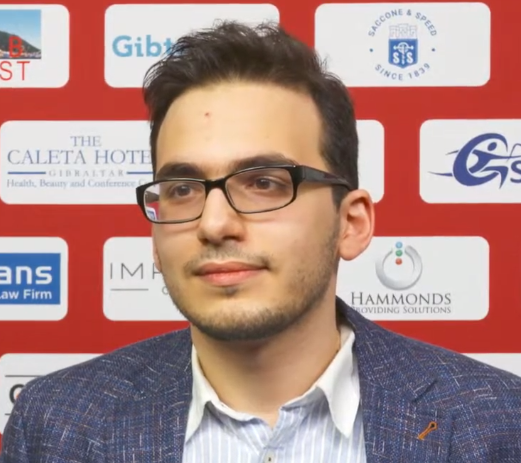
- Paravyan in 2020

Personal information
- Born: David Arturovich Paravyan; 8 March 1998 (age 28) Moscow, Russia

Chess career
- Country: Russia (until 2022); FIDE (since 2022)
- Title: Grandmaster (2017)
- FIDE rating: 2584 (July 2026)
- Peak rating: 2660 (September 2021)
- Peak ranking: No. 78 (September 2021)

David Arturovich Paravyan (Russian: Давид Артурович Паравян; born 8 March 1998) is a Russian chess player of Armenian descent, who was awarded the title of grandmaster by FIDE in 2017.

== Chess career ==
Born in Moscow, Paravyan received the international master title in 2013 and the grandmaster title in 2017.

In February 2018, Paravyan participated in the Aeroflot Open tournament. He finished eleventh out of 92, scoring 5½ points from 9 games (+4–2=3). The following year, Paravyan competed in the FIDE Grand Swiss Tournament 2019, held on the Isle of Man from 10 to 21 October. He finished tenth with a score of 7/11 (+4–1=6) for a performance rating of 2774. He won the Gibraltar Masters open tournament in January 2020. After tying for first on a score of 7½/10 (+5–0=5), Paravyan won a four-way playoff to take the title. He defeated Wang Hao in the finals.

Paravyan was one of the FIDE President's Nominees for the 2021 FIDE World Cup, where he defeated IM Mohamed Tissir in the first round and GM Alexander Onischuk in the second round before being eliminated by GM Maxime Vachier-Lagrave in the third round.
