= Olexandr Bortnyk =

Ukrainian chess grandmaster (born 1996)

Personal information
- Born: 18 October 1996 (age 30) Oleksandrivka, Mykolaiv Oblast, Ukraine

Chess career
- Country: Ukraine
- Title: Grandmaster (2015)
- FIDE rating: 2604 (November 2026)
- Peak rating: 2610 (December 2017)

Kick information
- Channel: bortnykchess
- Followers: 1,600

TikTok information
- Page: Oleksandr Bortnyk
- Followers: 21,700

Twitch information
- Channel: bortnykchess
- Years active: 2020–present
- Followers: 40,800

YouTube information
- Channel: BortnykChess
- Subscribers: 36,500
- Views: 17,731,000

Olexandr Mykolayovych Bortnyk (Ukrainian: Олександр Миколайович Бортник; born 18 October 1996) is a Ukrainian chess player. He was awarded the Grandmaster title in 2015, at the age of 19. A former chess prodigy, Bortnyk is one of the highest rated online players in both Blitz and Bullet.

In 2018, Bortnyk immigrated to the United States with his family and founded the Bortnik School of Chess. He has resided in Charlotte, North Carolina since 2022. Bortnyk has an older brother, Mykola Bortnyk, who holds the title of International Master. Bortnyk regularly streams on Twitch and uploads content on YouTube. He cowrote a PGN course on the Jobava London with the late Daniel Naroditsky and was co-writing a Chessable course on the King's Indian Defense with Naroditsky before his death. He stated on a later stream he would very likely continue it by annotating the text and recording the videos, as Naroditsky had already typed out all the moves. The course was released on Christmas Day 2025. Bortnyk collaborated with GM Kayden Troff to finish the course.

== Early years ==
He was born in the village of Oleksandrivka, Voznesensk Raion, Mykolaiv Oblast. He started playing chess at the age of 3. In 2001, five-year-old Bortnyk took part in competitions for the first time. Since 2002, he studied under the guidance of coach Roman Khayetskyi. After graduating from Oleksadrivska secondary school, he entered Admiral Makarov National University of Shipbuilding.

== Chess career/awards ==
Bortnyk has won multiple Ukrainian and European youth tournaments, as well as many chess.com and lichess.org online events.

=== 2003–2012 ===
He had impressive results in Ukrainian/European Youth Championships (U8, U12, U14, U16) during this period.

=== 2013 ===
1. Silver medalist of the World Championship U18 (Al-Ain, UAE)
2. Champion of Ukraine U20 (Rapid chess)
3. Champion of Ukraine U20 (Blitz)
4. 1st place — Dvorkovich Cup

=== 2014 ===
In 2014, Bortnyk won the World Youth Chess Championships in the U18 category held in Durban, South Africa.

=== 2016 ===
Bronstein Memorial (Minsk) — 2nd place.

=== 2019 ===
He reached the final of the Chess.com Bullet Chess championship but lost to Hikaru Nakamura.

=== 2023 ===
In January 2023, Bortnyk tied for first place with GM Razvan Preotu at the Charlotte Open, claiming the title on tiebreaks.

=== 2024 ===
In December 2024, Bortnyk tied for eleventh place at the World Blitz Championship. He finished with 9 points, just behind a 10-way tie for first at 9.5.

=== 2025 ===
Esports organization Natus Vincere (NAVI) signed Oleksandr Bortnyk when they launched their competitive chess division in February 2025.
