= Zbigniew Pakleza =

Polish chess grandmaster (born 1986)

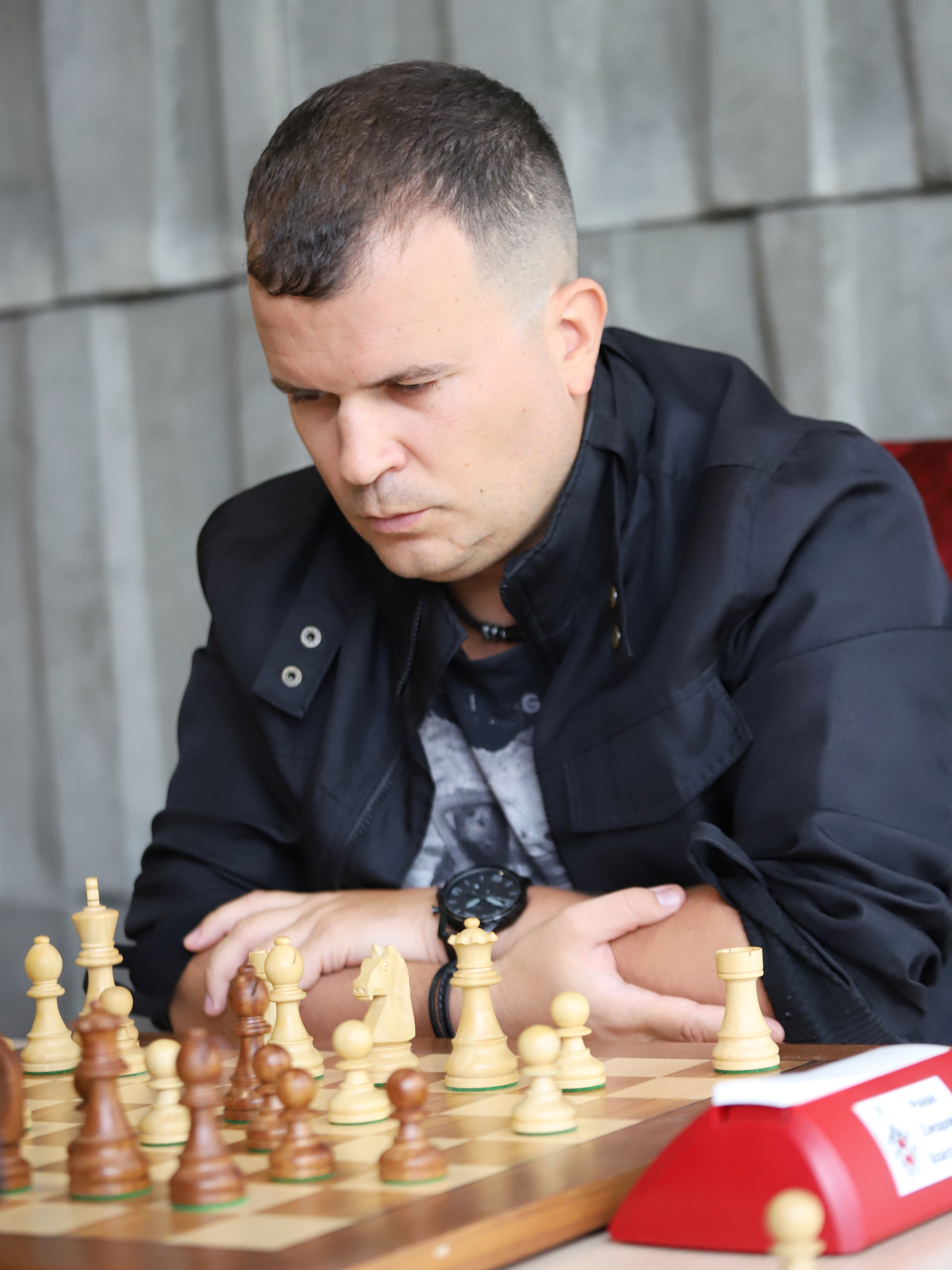
- Pakleza in 2021

Personal information
- Born: 5 December 1986 (age 39) Gliwice, Poland

Chess career
- Country: Poland
- Title: Grandmaster (2014)
- FIDE rating: 2499 (July 2026)
- Peak rating: 2520 (June 2015)

Zbigniew Pakleza (born 5 December 1986) is a Polish chess Grandmaster and a streamer.

== Chess career ==
Zbigniew Pakleza is a multiple medalist of the Polish Junior Chess Championship: 2002 (U16) - silver, 2001 (U16) - bronze. He represented Poland at the World Junior Chess Championship and European Youth Chess Championship. In 2002 won bronze medal in European Youth Chess Championship (U16) in Peniscola. In 2004 won the team gold medal at the Polish Junior Team Chess Championships. In 2007 shared 1st place (with Kevin Spraggett) in San Sebastián. In 2007 and 2008 shared 1st place in Open tournaments in Sitges. Zbigniew Pakleza has also competed successfully in several Polish Team Chess Championships (individual gold in 2008 and bronze in 2006, 2007). In 2014 shared 1st place in Rethymno chess tournament.
