= Thomas Beerdsen =

Dutch chess grandmaster (born 1998)

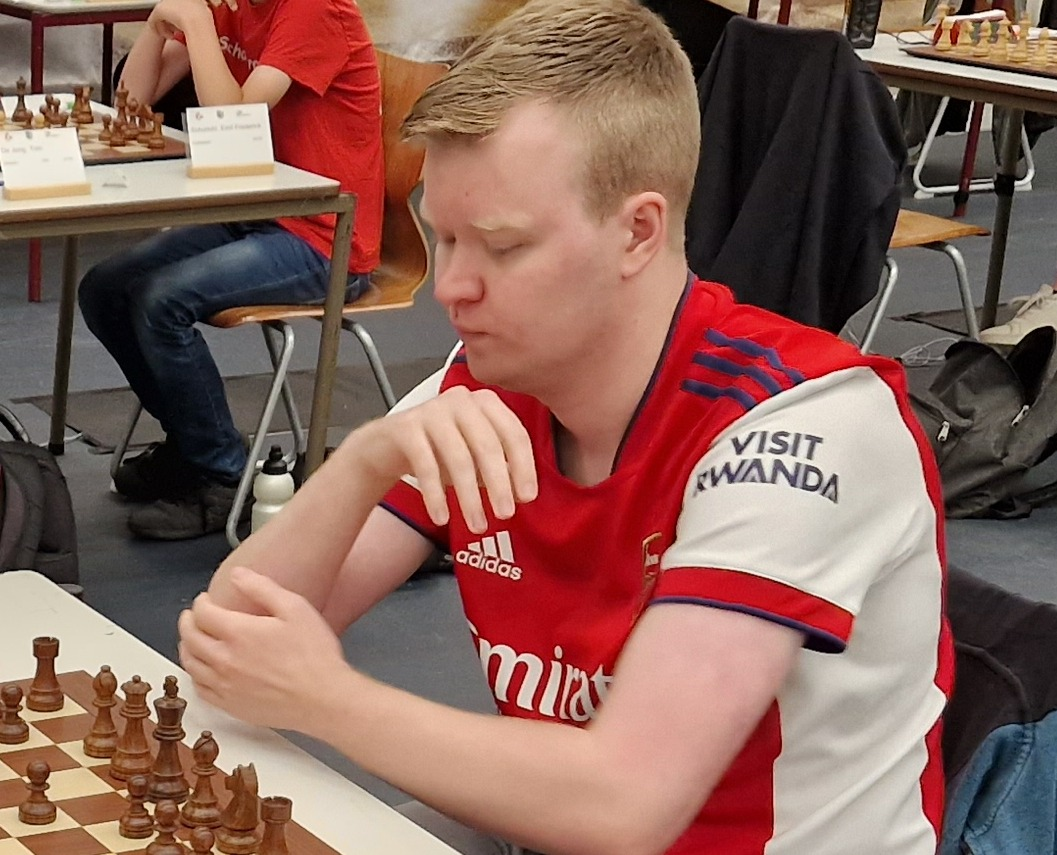
- Beerdsen in 2023

Personal information
- Born: September 13, 1998 (age 28) Apeldoorn, Netherlands

Chess career
- Country: Netherlands
- Title: Grandmaster (2023)
- FIDE rating: 2504 (September 2026)
- Peak rating: 2538 (June 2025)

Thomas Beerdsen is a Dutch chess grandmaster.

In 2016, he shared 3rd and 4th places in the national championship among players under 20 years of age.

== Chess career ==
In February 2017, Beerdsen's IM title was approved during the 9th Batavia Chess Tournament.

In 2020, Beerdsen won the OSBO speed chess tournament, defending his title.

In January 2023, Beerdsen obtained a GM norm at the Tata Steel Chess Tournament. He was one of the only IMs in the Challengers section, and defeated grandmasters Velimir Ivić and Abhimanyu Mishra and fellow Dutch IM Eline Roebers.

In May 2023, Beerdsen won the Limburg Open Chess Tournament after winning the 7-player tiebreak based on Sonneborn–Berger score.

In June 2023, Beerdsen officially met all of the requirements to become a Grandmaster. His title was confirmed and officialized at the end of August 2023.
