= Rudik Makarian =

Russian chess grandmaster (born 2004)

Personal information
- Born: Rudik Yurikovich Makarian; 30 July 2004 (age 21) Alatumani, Akhalkalaki, Georgia

Chess career
- Country: Russia (until 2022); FIDE (since 2022)
- Title: Grandmaster (2025)
- FIDE rating: 2543 (July 2026)
- Peak rating: 2562 (January 2023)

Rudik Yurikovich Makarian (Russian: Рудик Юрикович Макарян, Georgian: რუდიკ იურიკოვიჩ მაკარიანი; born 30 July 2004) is a Russian chess grandmaster.

== Chess career ==
Makarian was born on 30 July 2004 in the village of Alatumani in the municipality of Akhalkalaki, Georgia.

He won the U-16 World Youth Chess Championship in 2019 and the Russian Junior Chess Championship in 2020.

He qualified to play in the Chess World Cup 2021 where he was defeated 1½-½ by Kacper Piorun in the first round.

Top 32 Juniors FIDE February 2024.

He became a grandmaster in 2025, 6 years after becoming an international master, in 2019.
