= Sergei Lobanov (chess player) =

Russian chess grandmaster (born 2001)

Personal information
- Born: Sergei Andreevich Lobanov; 19 May 2001 (age 25) Saint Petersburg, Russia

Chess career
- Country: Russia (until 2022); FIDE (since 2022)
- Title: Grandmaster (2022)
- FIDE rating: 2522 (November 2026)
- Peak rating: 2548 (June 2025)

Sergei Andreevich Lobanov (Russian: Сергей Андреевич Лобанов; born 19 May 2001) is a Russian chess grandmaster.

== Biography ==
Sergei Lobanov was a student of Saint Petersburg chess school. He played for Russia in European Youth Chess Championships and World Youth Chess Championships in the different age groups and best result reached in 2015 in Poreč, when he won European Youth Chess Championship in the U14 age group. In 2013, Sergei Lobanov won bronze medal in World Youth Chess Championship in the U12 age group. He two times played for Russia team in World Youth U16 Chess Olympiads where he won gold (2017) and silver (2016) medal in team competition, as well as silver (2017) and bronze (2016) medals in individual competition. In 2016, Sergei Lobanov won the bronze medal in the Saint Petersburg Chess Championship. In 2017, he won Saint Petersburg International Chess tournament with Grandmaster norm.

In 2017, he was awarded the FIDE International Master (IM) title, and in 2022 he became a grandmaster (GM).
