= Ádám Kozák =

Hungarian chess grandmaster (born 2002)

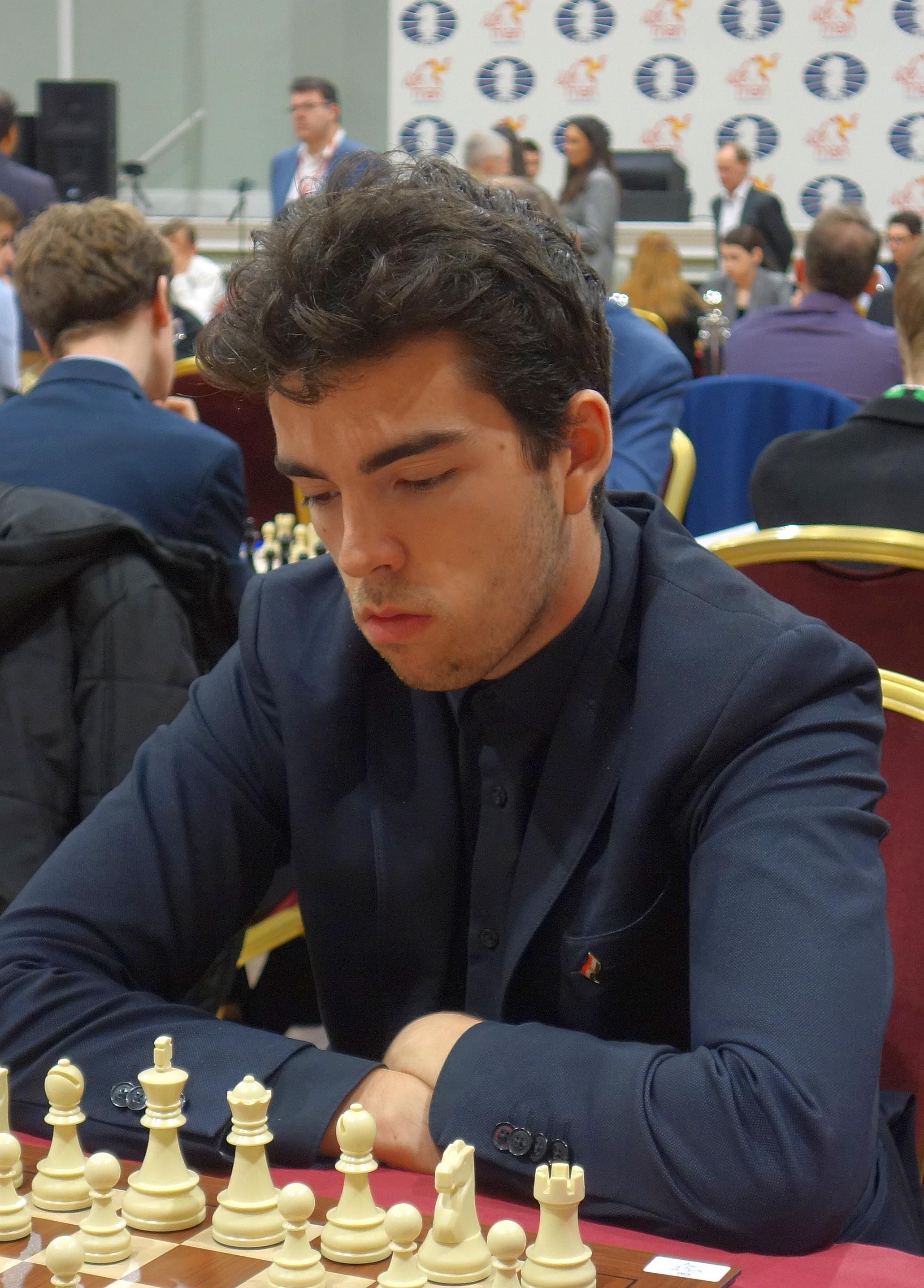
- Kozák in 2023

Personal information
- Born: 15 June 2002 (age 24) Budapest, Hungary

Chess career
- Country: Hungary
- Title: Grandmaster (2020)
- FIDE rating: 2531 (July 2026)
- Peak rating: 2610 (April 2024)

Ádám Kozák (born 15 June 2002) is a Hungarian chess grandmaster.

== Chess career ==
In 2019 in Tallinn, he won the U-18 European Rapid Chess Championship and the U-18 Blitz Championship. He was awarded the grandmaster title in 2020, becoming the youngest Hungarian to earn the title.

He was one of the 36 European players from the European Hybrid Qualification Chess Tournament to qualify for the Chess World Cup 2021.
