= Aram Hakobyan (chess player) =

Armenian chess grandmaster (born 2001)

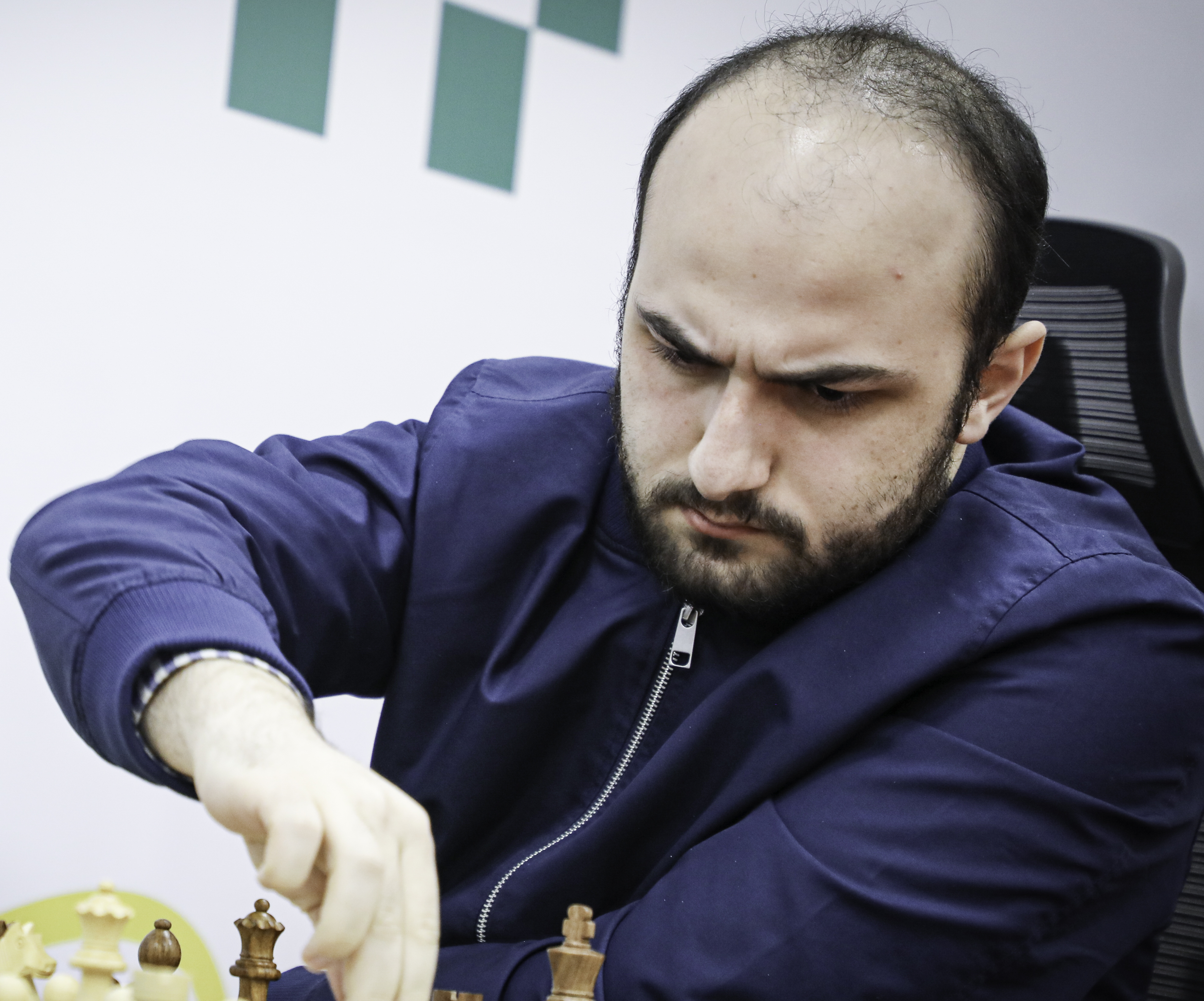
- Hakobyan in 2026

Personal information
- Born: April 1, 2001 (age 25) Yerevan, Armenia

Chess career
- Country: Armenia
- Title: Grandmaster (2018)
- FIDE rating: 2644 (November 2026)
- Peak rating: 2644 (November 2026)
- Ranking: No. 77 (November 2026)
- Peak ranking: No. 77 (November 2026)

Aram Hakobyan is an Armenian chess grandmaster.

== Chess career ==
Hakobyan began playing chess at the age of 6. He has won the Armenian Youth Championship for the U10, U12, U14, and U18 sections.

In December 2013, Hakobyan won the U12 section of the World Youth Chess Championship. He remained undefeated throughout the event, finishing with a final score of 9.5/11.

In October 2019, Hakobyan won the bronze medal in the World Junior Chess Championship.

In September 2023, Hakobyan won a Chess.com-hosted Titled Tuesday tournament alongside Sergey Drygalov.

== Personal life ==
He studied management at Webster University and played on their chess team.
