= Lê Tuấn Minh =

Vietnamese chess grandmaster (born 1996)

Personal information
- Born: 21 October 1996 (age 29) Hanoi, Vietnam

Chess career
- Country: Vietnam
- Title: Grandmaster (2022)
- FIDE rating: 2585 (September 2026)
- Peak rating: 2598 (October 2024)

Twitch information
- Channel: gmminhle
- Followers: 27,667
- Last updated: September 17, 2026

Lê Tuấn Minh (born 21 October 1996) is a Vietnamese chess player and Grandmaster. Tuấn Minh grew up in Hanoi and started playing chess at the age of 8. He attended Hanoi University of Law.

In 2020, Tuấn Minh won the Vietnamese Chess Championship with a score of 7 out of 8. In July 2022, he earned his final required norm to become Vietnam's 13th chess grandmaster.
