= Abhimanyu Puranik =

Indian chess grandmaster (born 2000)

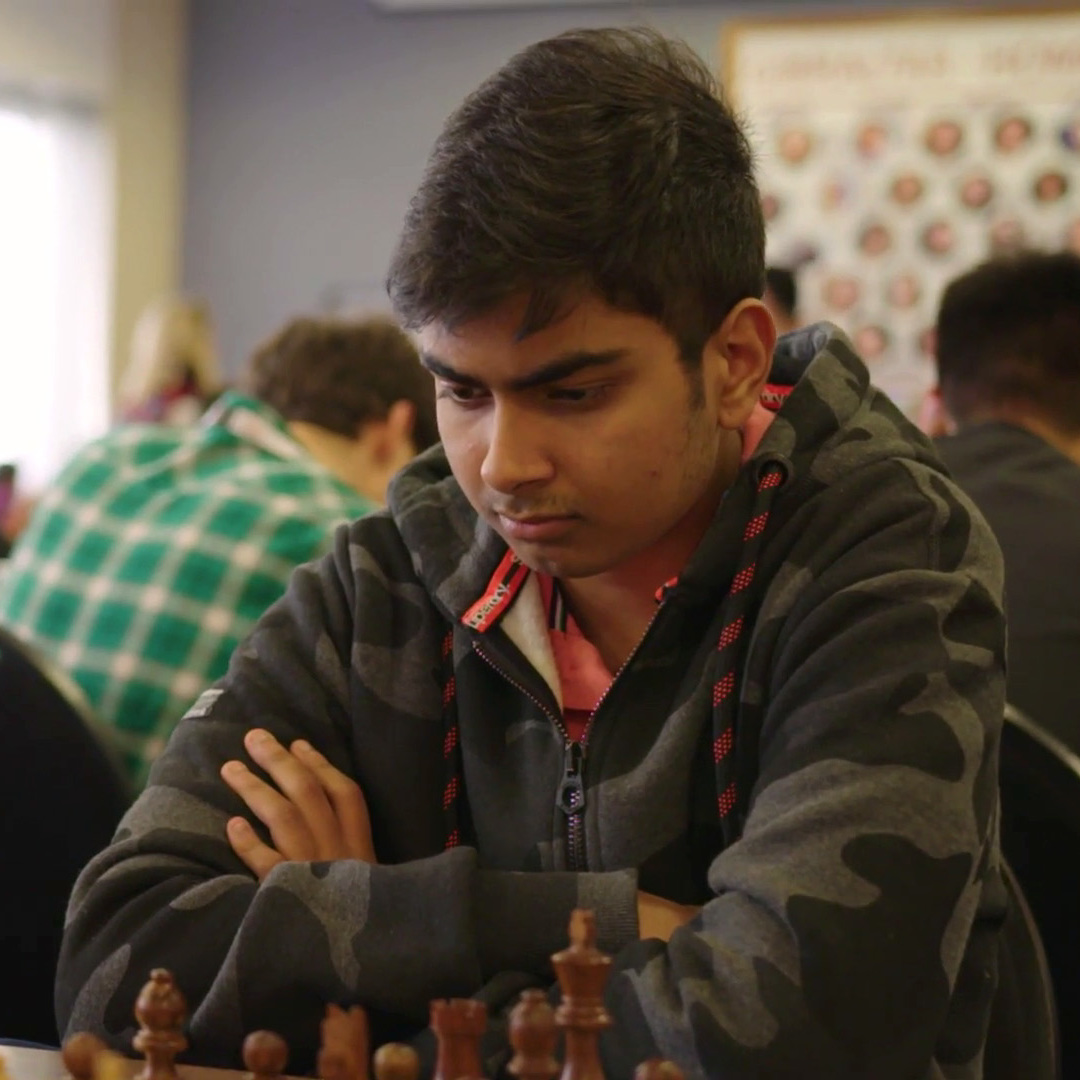
- Abhimanyu Puranik in 2020

Personal information
- Born: 11 February 2000 (age 26) Mumbai, India

Chess career
- Country: India
- Title: Grandmaster (2017)
- FIDE rating: 2629 (July 2026)
- Peak rating: 2652 (November 2024)
- Ranking: No. 97 (July 2026)
- Peak ranking: No. 79 (November 2024)

Abhimanyu Samir Puranik (Marathi: अभिमन्यु पुराणिक; born 11 February 2000, Mumbai) is an Indian chess grandmaster (GM, 2017).

== Career ==
In 2016 and 2018, Puranik scored 5.5 points out of 9 in the main tournament of the Isle of Man Open chess festival. In January 2019, he shared 1st-4th place at the IIFL Wealth Mumbai Open international chess tournament with 7 points out of 9 and finished third in the tie-break. Then in July 2019, he took 2nd place in the Bienne chess festival open tournament.

In 2018, Puranik was runner-up at the World Junior Chess Championship. In 2021, with the Indian team, he won the Asian Students Team Championship.

In 2021, in Riga Puranik won the rapid chess tournament at the festival Riga Technical University Open.

In October 2019, in Isle of Man Puranik finished 105th in the FIDE Grand Swiss Tournament.

Puranik was silver medalist of the Bangladesh Team Championship 2021 with the Shaheen Chess Club, also became the best player on the second board at the tournament, scoring 8 out of 10 possible points.

For his success in tournaments, the FIDE awarded Abhimanyu Puranik the title of International Master (IM) in 2015 and International Grandmaster (GM) in 2017.
