= Viacheslav Tilicheev =

Russian chess grandmaster (born 1994)

Personal information
- Born: Viacheslav Sergeyevich Tilicheev; 17 July 1994 (age 31) Krasnoyarsk, Russia

Chess career
- Country: Russia (until 2023); Serbia (since 2023)
- Title: Grandmaster (2020)
- FIDE rating: 2430 (July 2026)
- Peak rating: 2540 (March 2019)

Viacheslav Sergeyevich Tilicheev (Russian: Вячеслав Сергеевич Тиличеев; born 17 July 1994) is a Russian chess player and former chess prodigy who represents Serbia. He was awarded the title of Grandmaster in February 2020. His peak classical rating is 2540.

In 2020, Tilicheev won the 42nd Georgi Tringov Memorial on tie-break from Martin Petrov, Tsvetan Stoyanov, and Beloslava Krasteva.

== Notable games ==
- Victory against Vladislav Artemiev: Tilicheev vs Artemiev, European Rapid (2018), Grünfeld Defence (D91), 1-0
- Victory against Evgeny Gleizerov: Gleizerov vs Tilicheev, Cyprus International Open (2019), Benoni Defense (A62), 0-1
