= Tamás Bánusz =

Hungarian chess grandmaster (born 1989)

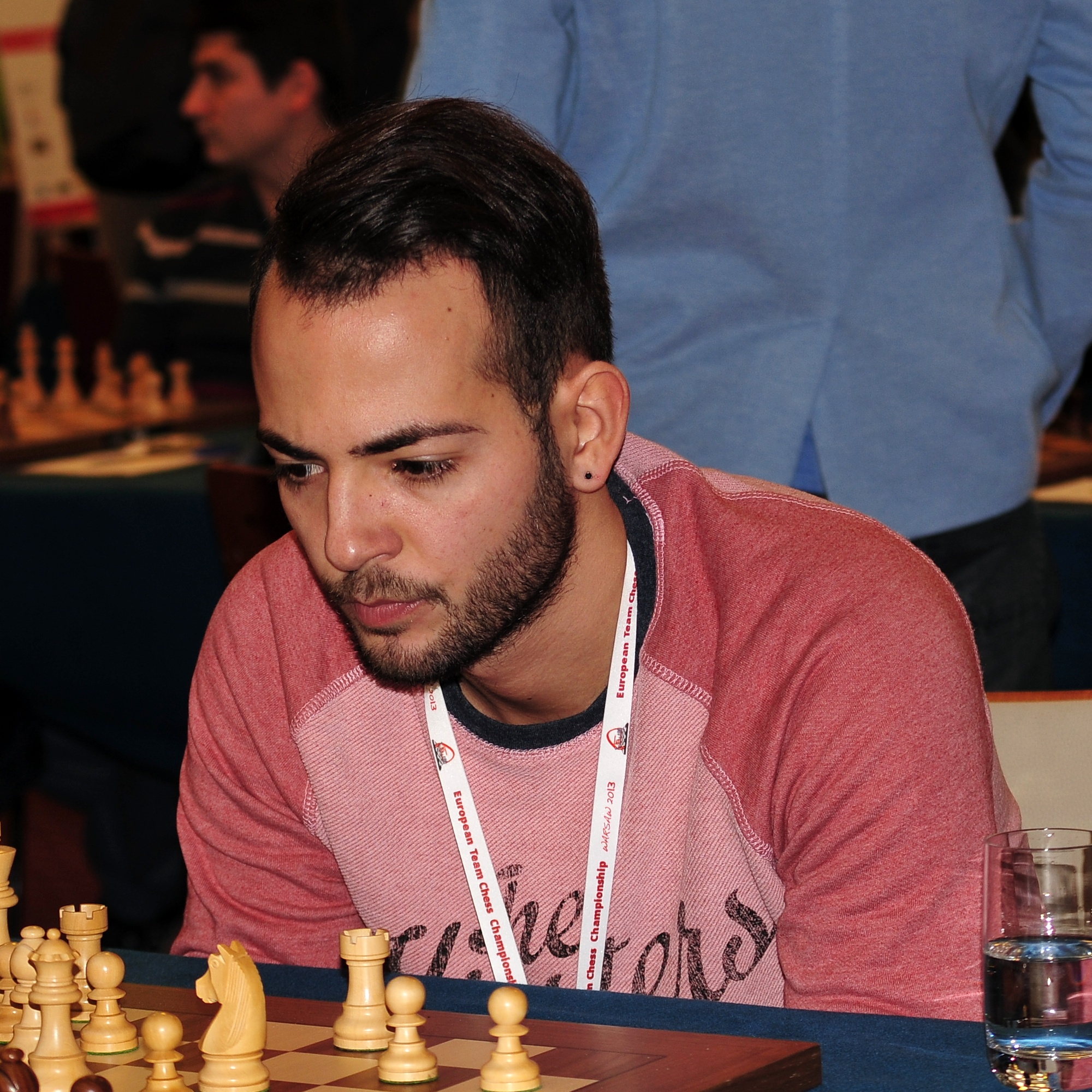
- Tamás Bánusz, 2013

Personal information
- Born: 8 April 1989 (age 37) Mohács, Hungary

Chess career
- Country: Hungary
- Title: Grandmaster (2011)
- FIDE rating: 2598 (July 2026)
- Peak rating: 2641 (January 2018)

Tamás Bánusz (born 8 April 1989) is a Hungarian chess grandmaster.

== Chess career ==
Born in 1989, Bánusz earned his international master title in 2005 and his grandmaster title in 2011. He is the No. 5 ranked Hungarian player as of February 2018.
