= Aleksandr Shimanov =

Russian chess grandmaster (born 1992)

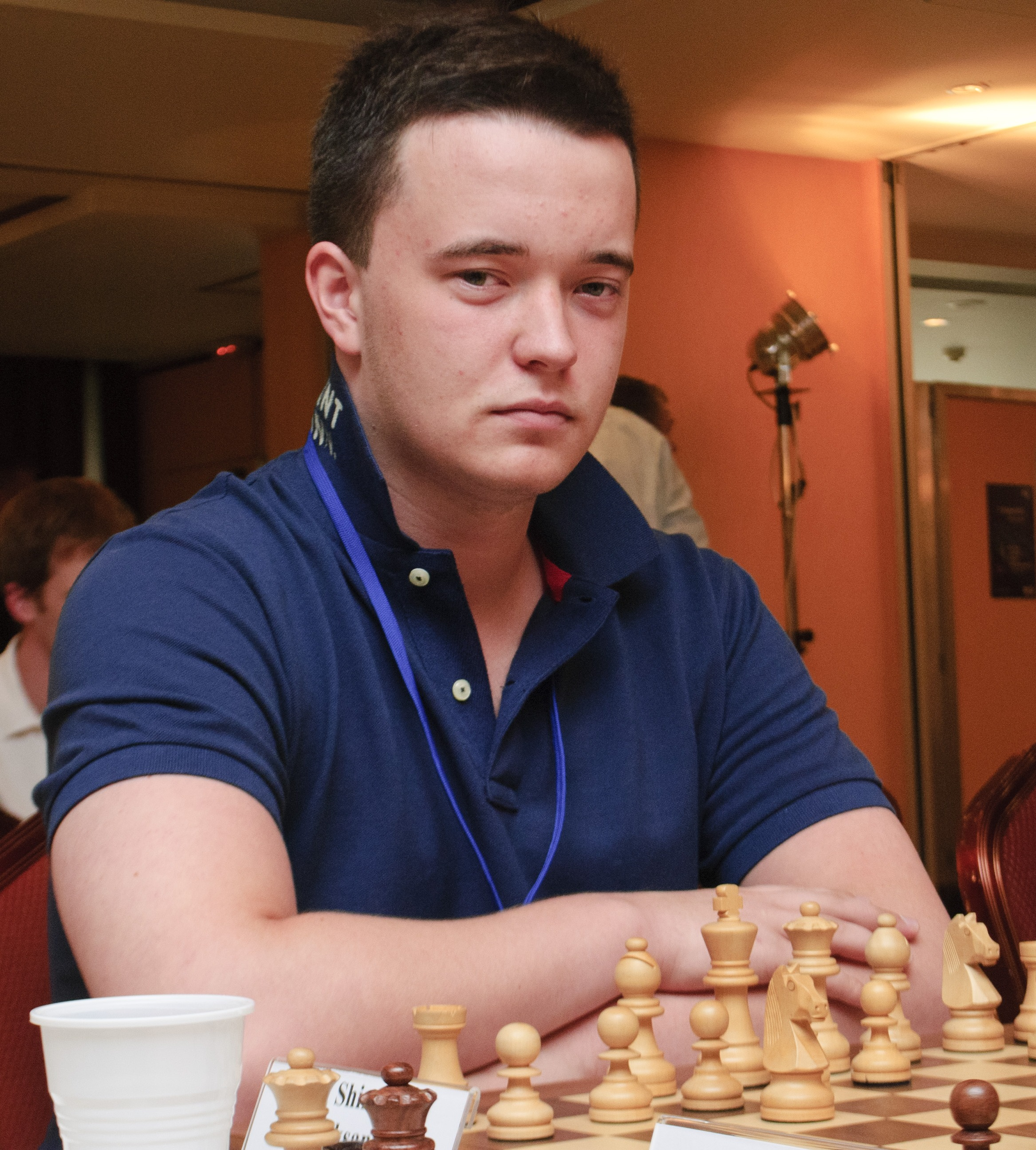
- Shimanov in 2012

Personal information
- Born: Aleksandr Alexandrovich Shimanov; 8 May 1992 (age 34) Saint Petersburg, Russia

Chess career
- Country: Russia (until 2022); FIDE (since 2022)
- Title: Grandmaster (2009)
- FIDE rating: 2581 (July 2026)
- Peak rating: 2664 (June 2013)
- Peak ranking: No. 79 (June 2013)

Aleksandr Alexandrovich Shimanov (born 8 May 1992) is a Russian chess player. He was awarded the title of Grandmaster (GM) by FIDE in 2009.

== Chess career ==
Aleksandr Shimanov became an International Master in 2007. Two years later, he received his grandmaster title when he was just 17 years old. In 2013, he tied for 1st-3rd at the Nakhchivan Open with Gadir Guseinov and Igor Kurnosov. GM Shimanov typically favors Closed Games as white, and the Caro-Kann Defense and King’s Indian Defense as black. He won the Saint Petersburg City Chess Championship in 2012 and played in the Chess World Cup 2013, where he was defeated in the second round by Gata Kamsky.
