= Benjámin Gledura =

Hungarian chess grandmaster (born 1999)

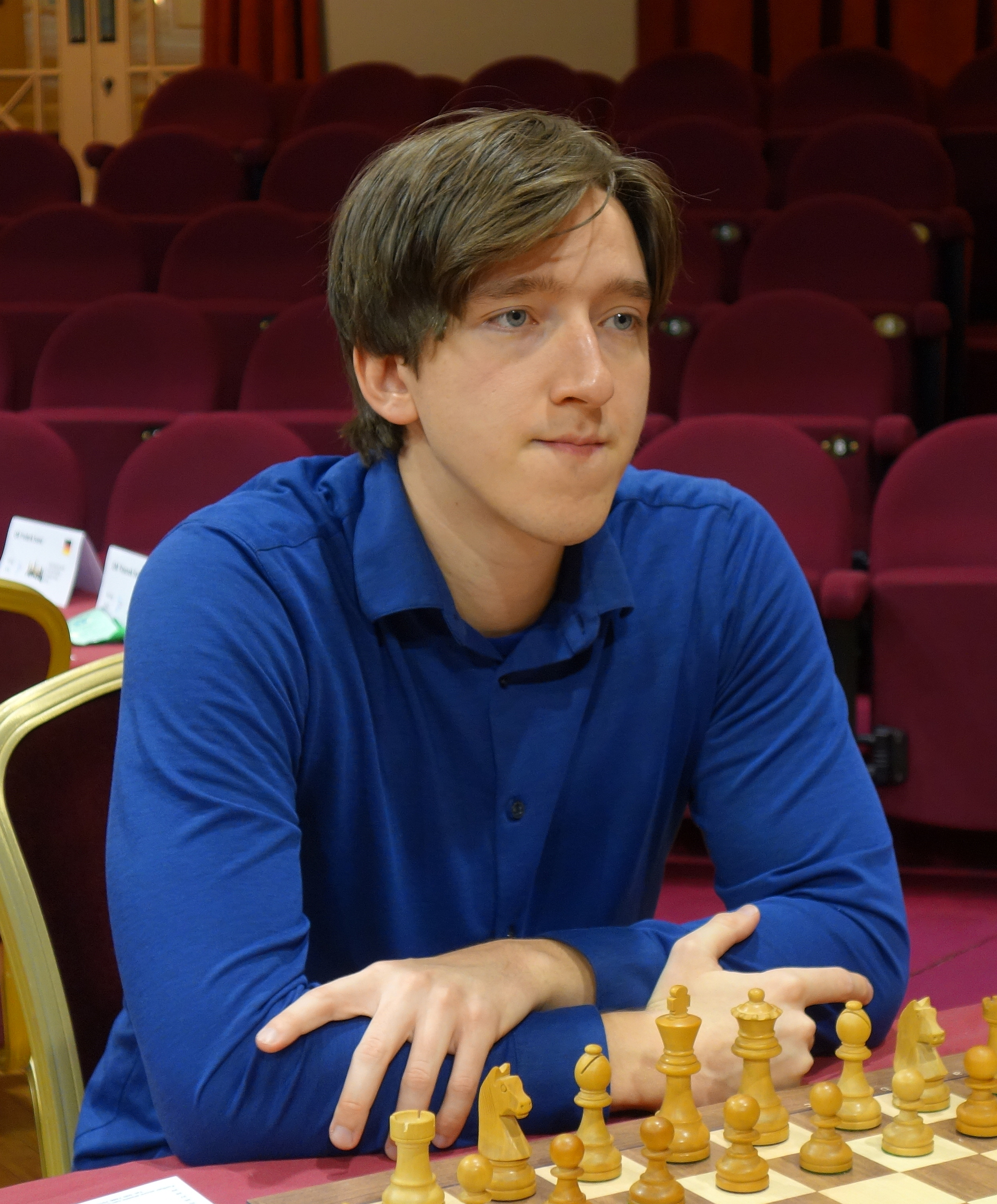
- Benjámin Gledura in 2023

Personal information
- Born: 4 July 1999 (age 27) Eger, Hungary

Chess career
- Country: Hungary
- Title: Grandmaster (2016)
- FIDE rating: 2628 (July 2026)
- Peak rating: 2668 (June 2025)
- Ranking: No. 100 (July 2026)
- Peak ranking: No. 54 (June 2025)

Benjámin Gledura (born 4 July 1999) is a Hungarian chess grandmaster.

== Chess career ==
Born in 1999, Gledura earned his international master title in 2014 and his grandmaster title in 2016. He is the No. 3 ranked active Hungarian player as of September 2023.

Gledura competed in the Tata Steel Challengers in January 2019, placing third with 8½/13 (+5–1=7). In March, he participated in the European Individual Chess Championship. He placed 19th with 7½/11 (+5–1=5) and qualified for the Chess World Cup 2019.
