= Sergey Drygalov =

Russian chess grandmaster (born 1999)

Personal information
- Born: May 19, 1999 (age 27) Kurgan, Russia

Chess career
- Country: Russia
- Title: Grandmaster (2022)
- FIDE rating: 2530 (July 2026)
- Peak rating: 2571 (December 2025)

Sergey Maksimovich Drygalov is a Russian chess grandmaster.

== Chess career ==
In April 2019, he won the Russian Junior U21 Championship.

In September 2020, he won the open individual section of the All-Russian Student Competition. In the team section, he was representing Ural State Mining University (which was also the winning team) alongside Alexey Sarana, Polina Shuvalova, and Anna Afonasieva.

In September 2023, he won a Titled Tuesday tournament held on Chess.com, where he went undefeated in the tournament.

In January 2025, Drygalov won the Cape Town Chess Masters, finishing on 9/9, two points clear of the runner-up.

== Personal life ==
His twin brother Andrey Drygalov is also a grandmaster.
