= Marin Bosiočić =

Croatian chess grandmaster (born 1988)

Marin Bosiocic
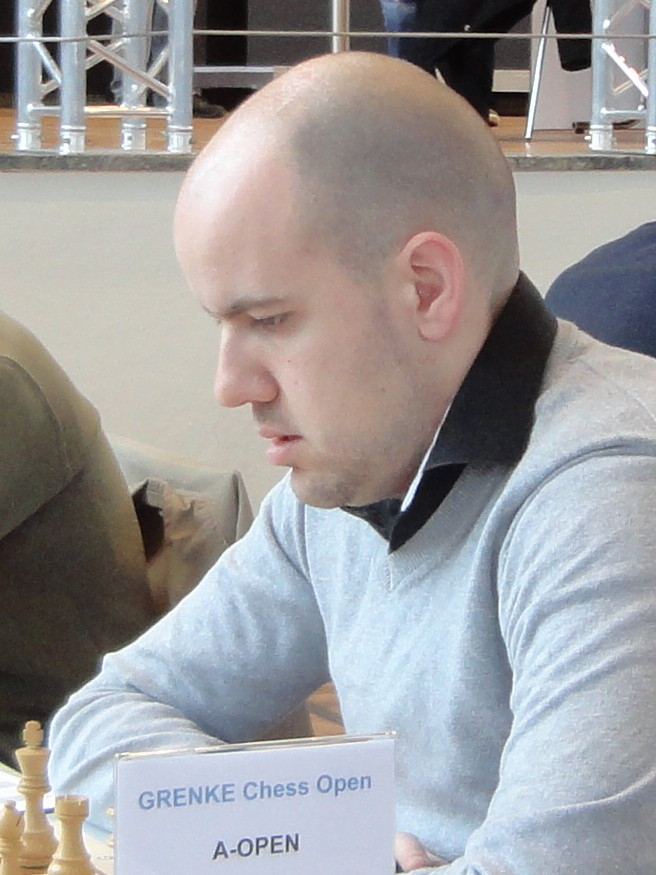

Personal information
- Born: August 8, 1988 (age 37) Rijeka, Croatia

Chess career
- Country: Croatia
- Title: Grandmaster (2008)
- FIDE rating: 2563 (July 2026)
- Peak rating: 2648 (January 2020)

Marin Bosiočić (born August 8, 1988) is a Croatian chess grandmaster.
