= FIDE flag player =

Chess player not affiliated to a country

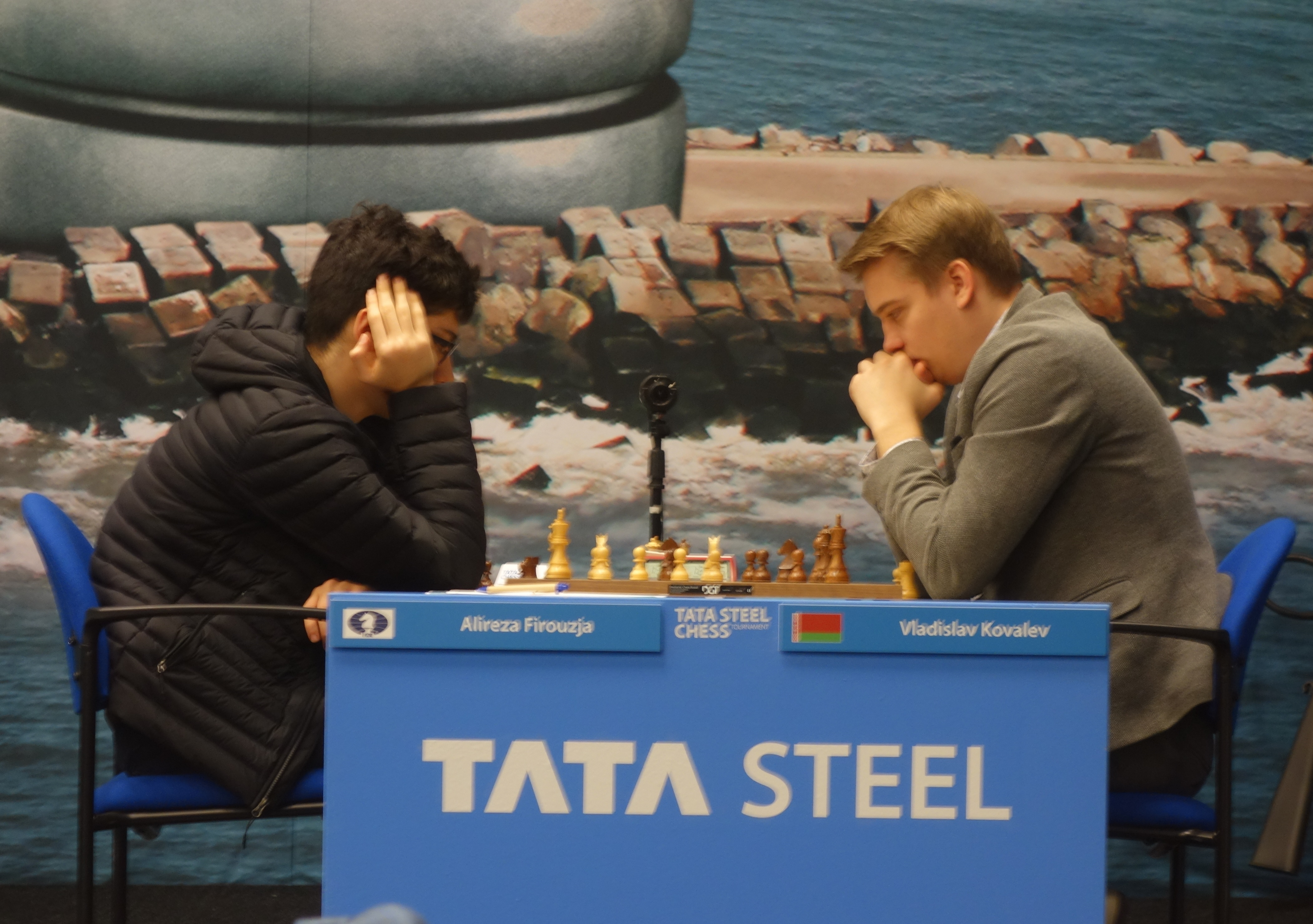
Alireza Firouzja (left) competing as a FIDE flag player

A FIDE flag player is a chess player who is unaffiliated with any national federation, and thus does not officially play for any country or national federation in FIDE-sanctioned tournaments. The flag takes its name from the French acronym for International Chess Federation or World Chess Federation (Fédération Internationale des Échecs)

Before applying for a FIDE flag, chess players first have to request a transfer to the federation of their permanent place of residence. Players with the FIDE flag are required to pay an annual fee of 100 euros. FIDE players with refugee status or Russian/Belarusian players playing with the FIDE flag are exempt from paying the fee.

== History ==
Alireza Firouzja is among the notable players who played under the FIDE flag. He formerly represented Iran but opted to play as a neutral athlete under FIDE in 2019 due to Iran's sports policy of boycotting Israel. He eventually transferred to France's federation in 2021.

=== Russian and Belarusian flags ===
Ian Nepomniachtchi of Russia was speculated to be required to play under the FIDE flag in the World Chess Championship 2021 due to the World Anti-Doping Agency's sanctions against Russia in the Olympics and tournaments considered as world championships. He officially played for the Chess Federation of Russia (CFR) instead with a flag bearing the CFR's logo and abbreviation.

On 27 February 2022, an extraordinary meeting of the FIDE Council was held in response to the Russian invasion of Ukraine. The Council decided, among other measures, to ban the display of Russian and Belarusian flags:

Following the call from IOC, the FIDE Council decides that no Russian and Belarusian national flag be displayed or anthem be played in all FIDE-rated international chess events. Instead – the national chess federation’s flag or the official symbol/logo shall be used. A simplified procedure for performing under the FIDE flag would be followed where it is crucial for the players or any other chess officials under the current geopolitical situation.

Players retained the right to choose, whether to play under their national chess federation with a black flag, or play under the FIDE flag, which would constitute them as "foreign player with a status of the original federation for the purpose of titles calculations and all related matters".

On 6 March 2022, the FIDE Council approved a simplified procedure for Russian/Belarusian players to perform under the FIDE flag, initially establishing the expiration date for this resolution on 31 May 2022. The expiration date has been continually extended by the FIDE council, as of December 2024, set to 1 January 2026. After the expiration date, "in the absence of other requests, the player will automatically be returned to the previous federation".

Since March 2022, most top-level Russian chess players started playing in international events under the FIDE flag, including Nepomniachtchi at the 2022 Candidates tournament, 2023 World Championship and 2024 Candidates tournament.

== See also ==
- Category:FIDE flag chess players
- List of FIDE federation player transfers
- Independent Olympians at the Olympic Games
