= World Rapid Chess Championship 2019 =

Chess tournament

	World Rapid Champion	Women's World Rapid Champion
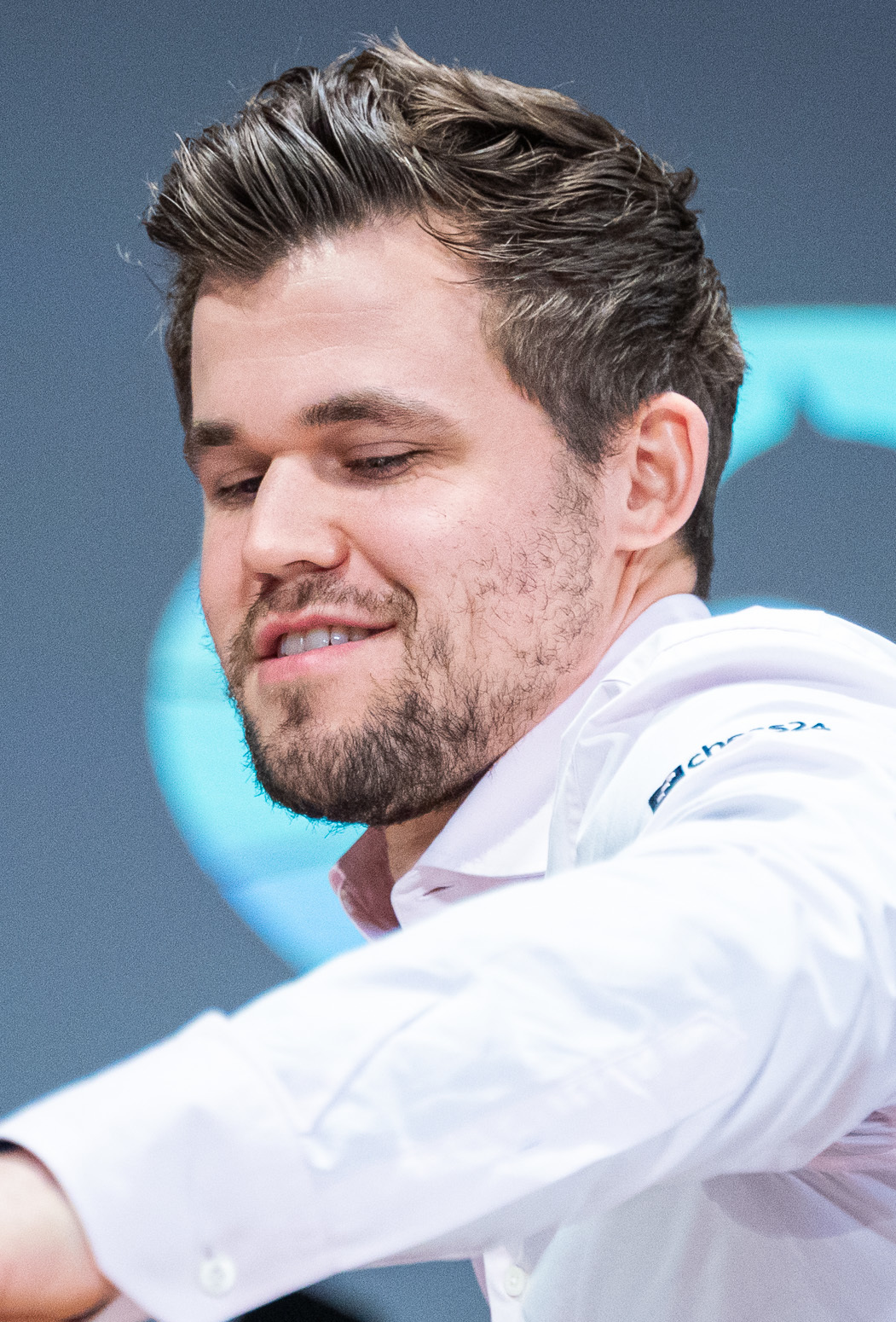
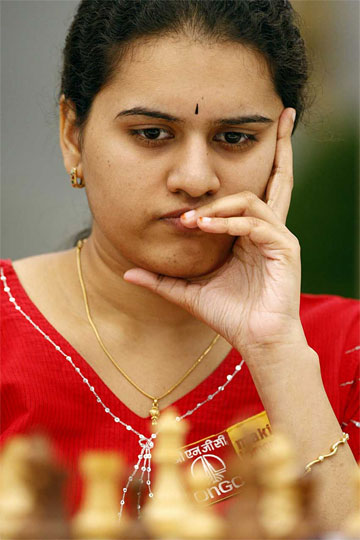
	(Norway) Magnus Carlsen	(India) Koneru Humpy
11½/15	Scores	9/12
	Born 30 November 1990; 29 years old	Born 31 March 1987; 32 years old
	World Rapid Champion	Women's World Rapid Champion
	Rating: 2886 (World No. 1)	Rating: 2438 (World No. 17)

The World Rapid Chess Championship 2019 (known as the King Salman World Rapid & Blitz Championship for sponsorship reasons) was a chess tournament held to determine the world champion in chess played under rapid time controls. Since 2012, FIDE has held the World Rapid and Blitz Championships at a joint tournament.

The event took place at the Luzhniki Stadium in Moscow, Russia between 26 and 28 December 2019, using a Swiss-system with 15 rounds for the open tournament and 12 rounds for the women's tournament. Players who were eligible to participate must have either been rated at least 2550 Elo in a FIDE rating list during 2019, or were a reigning national champion. The time control for the tournament was 15+10, meaning each player initially started with 15 minutes and gained 10 seconds increment with each move.

== Participants ==
207 players took part in the open tournament, and 122 in the women's tournament.

Code	Federation	Open	Women's	Total
ARG	Argentina	1	0	1
ARM	Armenia	7	4	11
AUT	Austria	2	0	2
AZE	Azerbaijan	6	5	11
BLR	Belarus	3	1	4
BRA	Brazil	2	0	2
BUL	Bulgaria	0	2	2
CAN	Canada	2	0	2
CHN	China	4	3	7
CRO	Croatia	2	0	1
CZE	(Czech Republic) Czechia	1	0	1
DEN	Denmark	0	2	2
EGY	Egypt	2	0	2
ESP	Spain	7	0	7
EST	Estonia	0	1	1
FID	(FIDE) none	1	0	1
FIN	Finland	1	1	2
FRA	France	1	1	2
GEO	(Georgia (country)) Georgia	3	5	8
GER	Germany	4	3	7
HKG	Hong Kong	1	0	1
HUN	Hungary	1	0	1
IND	India	11	2	13
IRI	Iran	0	3	3
ISR	Israel	5	0	5
ITA	Italy	0	1	1
KAZ	Kazakhstan	6	6	12
KGZ	Kyrgyzstan	1	0	1
KOR	South Korea	1	0	1
KSA	Saudi Arabia	5	0	5
LTU	Lithuania	1	0	1
MAR	Morocco	1	0	1
MDA	Moldova	1	0	1
MGL	Mongolia	3	6	9
NED	Netherlands	1	0	1
NEP	Nepal	1	0	1
NOR	Norway	3	0	3
POL	Poland	6	2	8
ROU	Romania	0	2	2
RUS	Russia (host)	65	42	107
SRB	Serbia	3	2	5
SUI	Switzerland	1	0	1
SWE	Sweden	1	2	3
TJK	Tajikistan	0	1	1
TKM	Turkmenistan	2	1	3
TUR	Turkey	3	1	4
UAE	United Arab Emirates	1	0	1
UKR	Ukraine	3	8	12
USA	United States	4	2	6
UZB	Uzbekistan	2	0	2
VEN	Venezuela	1	0	1
VIE	Vietnam	2	0	2

== Prize Fund ==
The prize fund for both the open and women's tournament is shown below. In case of a tie (except for first place) all prize money was shared between the players. Players outside the brackets did not receive any prize money. All amounts are in USD.

Open tournament:

1st place: $60,000

2nd place: $50,000

3rd place: $40,000

4th place: $30,000

5th place: $25,000

6th place: $22,000

7th place: $18,000

8th place: $14,000

9th place: $11,000

10th place: $8,000

11th–16th places: $5,000

17th–25th places: $3,000

26th–35th places: $1,500

Total: $350,000

Women's tournament:

1st place: $40,000

2nd place: $30,000

3rd place: $20,000

4th place: $15,000

5th place: $10,000

6th place: $7,000

7th place: $6,000

8th place: $5,000

9th place: $4,000

10th place: $3,000

11th–15th places: $2,000

Total: $150,000

== Schedule ==
The opening ceremony took place on Wednesday 25 December. Start times are approximate as all matches in the previous round had to finish before the next round could commence. All times are CET.

Open round	Women's round	Date	Time
1	1	Thursday 26 December	15:00
2	2	Thursday 26 December	16:15
3	3	Thursday 26 December	17:30
4	4	Thursday 26 December	18:45
5		Thursday 26 December	20:00
6	5	Friday 27 December	15:00
7	6	Friday 27 December	16:15
8	7	Friday 27 December	17:30
9	8	Friday 27 December	18:45
10		Friday 27 December	20:00
11	9	Saturday 28 December	15:00
12	10	Saturday 28 December	16:15
13	11	Saturday 28 December	17:30
14	12	Saturday 28 December	18:45
15		Saturday 28 December	20:00

== Open tournament results ==
The following table lists all participants, with the results from the 15 rounds. They are ranked according to the results, taking into account the tie-breaks.

Notation: "1 (W 56)" indicates a win (1 point) with white pieces (W) against player of rank 56 (Azamat Utegaliyev). The first tiebreak (labeled BC1) is the Buchholz Cut 1 score, the second tiebreak (labeled BS) is the Buchholz score, and the third tiebreak (labelled AROC1) is the average rating of opponents cut 1.

Rank	Name	Rating	1	2	3	4	5	6	7	8	9	10	11	12	13	14	15	Total	BC1	BS	AROC1
1	(Norway) Magnus Carlsen	2886	1 (W 56)	½ (B 17)	1 (W 116)	½ (B 36)	1 (W 42)	½ (W 28)	½ (B 69)	1 (W 71)	1 (B 52)	1 (W 13)	½ (B 14)	1 (W 5)	1 (W 12)	½ (W 6)	½ (B 3)	11½	128½	136	2719
2	(FIDE) Alireza Firouzja	2614	½ (W 141)	1 (B 101)	1 (W 9)	1 (B 31)	0 (W 7)	½ (B 5)	½ (W 16)	0 (B 18)	1 (W 82)	½ (B 11)	1 (W 46)	1 (W 13)	½ (B 24)	1 (B 28)	1 (W 12)	10½	130	137	2706
3	(United States) Hikaru Nakamura	2819	1 (W 170)	½ (B 80)	1 (W 73)	0 (B 39)	1 (W 123)	½ (B 38)	1 (W 41)	½ (B 68)	½ (W 16)	1 (B 76)	1 (W 7)	½ (W 14)	½ (B 6)	1 (B 15)	½ (W 1)	10½	125½	131½	2698
4	(Russia) Vladislav Artemiev	2756	½ (B 97)	1 (W 177)	½ (B 78)	½ (W 22)	½ (B 104)	1 (W 144)	½ (B 74)	1 (W 17)	½ (B 69)	½ (W 41)	½ (B 30)	1 (W 32)	1 (B 19)	1 (W 14)	½ (W 8)	10½	120½	126	2653
5	(Armenia) Levon Aronian	2784	1 (B 171)	1 (W 75)	½ (B 19)	½ (W 42)	½ (B 17)	½ (W 2)	½ (B 38)	1 (W 74)	½ (B 18)	1 (W 52)	1 (B 13)	0 (W 1)	½ (W 28)	½ (B 10)	1 (W 40)	10	130½	136½	2684
6	(United States) Leinier Domínguez	2755	½ (W 100)	1 (B 131)	1 (W 80)	1 (B 114)	1 (W 16)	½ (B 15)	½ (W 12)	½ (B 20)	½ W (32)	½ (B 29)	1 (W 28)	½ (B 21)	½ (W 3)	½ (B 1)	½ (W 7)	10	128½	135½	2719
7	(Poland) Jan-Krzysztof Duda	2751	1 (W 159)	½ (B 123)	1 (W 74)	1 (W 35)	1 (B 2)	0 (B 12)	½ (W 54)	½ (B 30)	1 (W 39)	1 (W 19)	0 (B 3)	½ (W 18)	½ (B 14)	1 (W 32)	½ (B 6)	10	128½	135	2693
8	(Russia) Daniil Dubov	2752	1 (W 135)	½ (B 111)	1 (W 84)	1 (B 58)	½ (W 52)	½ (W 32)	½ (B 71)	½ (B 39)	½ (W 68)	½ (W 69)	1 (B 41)	½ (B 29)	½ (W 10)	1 (W 18)	½ (B 4)	10	122½	129½	2681
9	(Ukraine) Anton Korobov	2818	½ (B 177)	1 (W 180)	0 (B 2)	½ (W 97)	0 (B 127)	½ (W 87)	1 (B 149)	1 (W 93)	1 (B 143)	1 (W 54)	1 (W 10)	½ (B 28)	½ (W 29)	½ (B 16)	1 (W 36)	10	114½	120	2629
10	(Spain) David Antón Guijarro	2709	½ (B 165)	½ (W 151)	½ (B 98)	0 (W 99)	1 (B 149)	1 (W 106)	½ (B 40)	1 (W 177)	1 (B 80)	1 (W 67)	0 (B 9)	1 (W 33)	½ (B 8)	½ (W 5)	1 (B 35)	10	114½	120	2613
11	(China) Yu Yangyi	2747	1 (W 194)	½ (B 49)	0 (W 30)	½ (B 100)	0 (W 72)	1 (B 186)	1 (W 127)	½ (W 47)	1 (B 179)	½ (W 2)	½ (B 38)	1 (W 99)	½ (B 35)	1 (W 41)	1 (B 29)	10	114½	119½	2602
12	(Azerbaijan) Shakriyar Mamedyarov	2752	1 (B 166)	½ (W 22)	1 (B 95)	1 (W 54)	1 (B 19)	1 (W 7)	½ (B 6)	½ (W 28)	0 (B 14)	½ (W 32)	½ (B 18)	1 (W 20)	0 (B 1)	1 (W 25)	0 (B 2)	9½	133½	139½	2713
13	(Vietnam) Lê Quang Liêm	2740	1 (W 108)	1 (B 85)	½ (W 68)	½ (B 51)	1 (W 45)	½ (B 52)	½ (W 30)	1 (B 15)	1 (W 20)	0 (B 1)	0 (W 5)	0 (B 2)	1 (W 75)	½ (B 26)	1 (W 60)	9½	127	134½	2659
14	(France) Maxime Vachier-Lagrave	2873	½ (B 180)	1 (W 187)	1 (B 130)	1 (W 71)	½ (W 15)	½ (B 20)	½ (W 39)	1 (B 54)	1 (W 12)	½ (B 28)	½ (W 1)	½ (B 3)	½ (W 7)	0 (B 4)	½ (W 19)	9½	127	132½	2705
15	(Israel) Ilya Smirin	2584	1 (W 203)	1 (W 103)	1 (B 125)	1 (W 32)	½ (B 14)	½ (W 6)	0 (B 28)	0 (W 13)	½ (B 59)	1 (W 44)	1 (B 43)	½ (W 24)	1 (B 31)	0 (W 3)	½ (B 16)	9½	126½	133½	2743
16	(Netherlands) Anish Giri	2747	1 (B 163)	½ (W 50)	1 (B 179)	1 (W 53)	0 (B 6)	½ (W 75)	½ (B 2)	1 (W 22)	½ (B 3)	½ (W 30)	½ (B 33)	½ (W 35)	1 (B 48)	½ (W 9)	(W 15)	9½	126½	132	2643
17	(Armenia) Hrant Melkumyan	2631	1 (W 115)	½ (W 1)	½ (B 21)	1 (B 94)	½ (W 5)	1 (W 23)	0 (B 29)	0 (B 4)	0 (W 72)	1 (B 136)	1 (W 82)	1 (W 146)	½ (B 55)	1 (W 44)	½ (B 24)	9½	126	133	2685
18	(Russia) Peter Svidler	2738	½ (B 126)	1 (W 97)	1 (B 89)	½ (W 107)	½ (B 50)	½ (W 34)	½ (B 78)	1 (W 2)	½ (W 5)	1 (B 26)	½ (W 12)	½ (B 7)	½ (W 21)	0 (B 8)	1 (W 58)	9½	126	133	2656
19	(Russia) Pavel Ponkratov	2687	1 (W 133)	1 (B 90)	½ (W 5)	1 (B 121)	0 (W 12)	0 (B 99)	1 (W 108)	1 (B 56)	1 (W 23)	0 (B 7)	1 (W 53)	½ (B 31)	0 (W 4)	1 (W 45)	½ (B 14)	9½	124	131	2651
20	(Russia) Alexander Motylev	2703	1 (B 86)	1 (W 128)	½ (W 51)	½ (B 33)	1 (W 85)	½ (W 14)	1 (B 67)	½ (W 6)	0 (B 13)	½ (B 68)	1 (W 45)	0 (B 12)	½ (W 34)	½ (B 30)	1 (W 53)	9½	123	130	2635
21	(Russia) Alexander Grischuk	2808	1 (W 110)	½ (B 74)	½ (W 17)	1 (B 78)	½ (W 38)	0 (B 54)	1 (W 51)	½ (B 26)	½ (W 73)	1 (B 96)	1 (W 68)	½ (W 6)	½ (B 18)	½ (B 29)	½ (W 22)	9½	122½	130	2651
22	(Russia) Evgeny Alekseev	2603	1 (W 105)	½ (B 12)	½ (W 79)	½ (B 4)	½ (W 31)	1 (B 122)	½ (W 55)	0 (B 16)	0 (W 101)	1 (B 113)	1 (W 91)	½ (W 52)	1 (B 103)	1 (W 69)	½ (B 21)	9½	119	126	2680
23	(Russia) Vladimir Fedoseev	2768	1 (W 93)	0 (B 51)	1 (W 172)	1 (B 111)	½ (W 68)	0 (B 17)	1 (W 104)	1 (W 38)	0 (B 19)	½ (B 73)	1 (W 101)	½ (B 36)	½ (W 60)	½ (B 42)	1 (W 52)	9½	117½	123½	2624
24	(Russia) Dmitry Andreikin	2748	1 (W 189)	0 (B 143)	1 (W 108)	½ (B 123)	1 (W 155)	½ (B 68)	½ (W 73)	½ (B 80)	1 (W 99)	1 (B 83)	½ (W 29)	½ (B 15)	½ (W 2)	½ (B 36)	½ (W 17)	9½	114	119½	2620
25	(Israel) Boris Gelfand	2700	0 (W 67)	½ (B 184)	1 (W 147)	½ (B 109)	1 (W 182)	½ (B 33)	1 (W 85)	½ (B 50)	1 (W 88)	½ (B 45)	½ (W 72)	½ (B 34)	1 (W 53)	0 (B 12)	1 (W 51)	9½	113	118½	2568
26	(Georgia (country)) Ivan Cheparinov	2647	1 (B 140)	½ (W 150)	0 (B 121)	½ (W 98)	½ (B 86)	1 (W 192)	1 (B 148)	½ (W 21)	1 (B 81)	0 (W 18)	½ (B 37)	½ (W 67)	1 (B 77)	½ (W 13)	1 (B 55)	9½	112½	117½	2528
27	(United States) Timur Gareyev	2604	0 (W 168)	0 (B 182)	½ (W 158)	1 (B 101)	0 (W 152)	1 (B 161)	0 (W 90)	1 (B 160)	0 (W 147)	1 (B 192)	1 (W 115)	1 (B 122)	1 (W 91)	1 (B 87)	1 (W 61)	9½	98½	103½	2492
28	(China) Wang Hao	2748	1 (W 136)	1 (B 47)	1 (W 38)	½ (B 52)	1 (W 39)	½ (B 1)	1 (W 15)	½ (B 12)	½ (W 29)	½ (W 14)	0 (B 6)	½ (W 9)	½ (B 5)	0 (W 2)	½ (B 48)	9	133½	140½	2718
29	(Russia) Ian Nepomniachtchi	2745	1 (B 72)	1 (W 40)	½ (B 35)	½ (W 50)	½ (B 75)	1 (W 143)	1 (W 17)	½ (B 32)	½ (B 28)	½ (W 6)	½ (B 24)	½ (W 8)	½ (B 9)	½ (W 21)	0 (W 11)	9	129	135½	2695
30	(Russia) Boris Grachev	2606	½ (B 77)	1 (W 117)	1 (B 11)	½ (W 44)	½ (B 102)	1 (W 43)	½ (B 13)	½ (W 7)	½ (W 31)	½ (B 16)	½ (W 4)	½ (W 55)	½ (B 69)	½ (W 20)	½ (B 32)	9	127	134½	2702
31	(Russia) Sergey Karjakin	2749	1 (B 34)	1 (W 104)	½ (B 71)	0 (W 2)	½ (B 22)	1 (W 47)	½ (B 75)	1 (W 78)	½ (B 30)	1 (W 35)	½ (B 32)	½ (W 19)	0 (W 15)	½ (B 60)	½ (W 42)	9	125	132½	2632
32	(Azerbaijan) Gadir Guseinov	2691	1 (B 183)	1 (W 129)	1 (W 143)	0 (B 15)	1 (W 33)	½ (B 8)	1 (W 50)	½ (W 29)	½ (B 6)	½ (B 12)	½ (W 31)	0 (B 4)	1 (W 72)	0 (B 7)	½ (W 30)	9	125	130½	2667
33	(Russia) Alexey Dreev	2588	½ (B 144)	1 (W 190)	1 (B 59)	½ (W 20)	0 (B 32)	½ (W 25)	½ (B 44)	1 (W 146)	1 (W 36)	½ (B 57)	½ (W 16)	0 (B 10)	½ (W 61)	1 (B 84)	½ (W 46)	9	122	127½	2676
34	(Poland) Mateusz Bartel	2544	0 (W 31)	1 (B 191)	1 (W 118)	1 (B 60)	½ (W 69)	½ (B 18)	½ (W 83)	½ (W 59)	½ (B 71)	½ (B 46)	1 (W 42)	½ (W 25)	½ (B 20)	½ (B 63)	½ (W 43)	9	121½	127	2673
35	(Russia) Mikhail Antipov	2636	1 (B 124)	1 (W 70)	½ (W 29)	0 (B 7)	½ (W 122)	0 (B 56)	1 (W 131)	1 (B 152)	1 (W 61)	0 (B 31)	1 (W 63)	½ (B 16)	½ (W 11)	1 (B 57)	0 (W 10)	9	120½	127	2648
36	(Azerbaijan) Rauf Mamedov	2679	½ (W 147)	1 (B 161)	1 (W 155)	½ (W 1)	½ (B 107)	0 (B 67)	1 (W 53)	½ (W 70)	0 (B 33)	1 (W 92)	1 (B 50)	½ (W 23)	1 (B 64)	½ (W 24)	0 (B 9)	9	119½	126	2615
37	(China) Xu Yinglun	2478	½ (W 60)	1 (B 41)	½ (W 76)	½ (B 62)	½ (W 73)	0 (B 42)	1 (W 157)	1 (B 51)	0 (W 83)	1 (B 84)	½ (W 26)	½ (B 58)	½ (W 46)	1 (B 68)	½ (W 57)	9	118½	125	2659
38	(Russia) Dmitry Bocharov	2642	1 (B 169)	1 (W 148)	0 (B 28)	1 (W 164)	½ (B 21)	½ (W 3)	½ (W 5)	0 (B 23)	1 (W 56)	½ (B 70)	½ (W 11)	0 (B 53)	1 (W 145)	½ (B 89)	1 (W 72)	9	118½	124½	2604
39	(Spain) Alexei Shirov	2672	1 (W 152)	½ (B 168)	1 (W 67)	1 (W 3)	0 (B 28)	1 (W 70)	½ (B 14)	½ (W 8)	0 (B 7)	0 (B 101)	½ (W 100)	1 (B 110)	1 (W 105)	0 (B 40)	1 (W 89)	9	118½	124½	2599
40	(India) Surya Shekhar Ganguly	2592	1 (W 118)	0 (B 29)	½ (W 134)	1 (B 162)	½ (W 91)	½ (B 79)	½ (W 10)	½ (B 63)	1 (W 103)	½ (W 55)	½ (B 52)	½ (W 41)	1 (B 125)	1 (W 39)	0 (B 5)	9	117½	124	2676
41	(Russia) Sanan Sjugirov	2664	½ (B 153)	0 (W 37)	1 (B 174)	½ (W 126)	1 (B 151)	1 (W 124)	0 (B 3)	1 (W 77)	1 (W 121)	½ (B 4)	0 (W 8)	½ (B 40)	1 (W 101)	0 (B 11)	1 (W 93)	9	116½	122½	2568
42	(Russia) Aleksandr Shimanov	2669	1 (W 182)	½ (B 172)	1 (W 82)	½ (B 5)	0 (B 1)	1 (W 37)	0 (B 121)	1 (W 124)	0 (B 67)	1 (W 178)	0 (B 34)	1 (W 98)	1 (B 99)	½ (W 23)	½ (B 31)	9	114½	120	2571
43	(Georgia (country)) Baadur Jobava	2702	1 (W 113)	0 (B 116)	1 (W 156)	½ (B 56)	1 (W 106)	0 (B 30)	1 (W 89)	½ (B 88)	½ (W 50)	1 (B 97)	0 (W 15)	0 (B 51)	1 (W 85)	1 (B 95)	½ (B 34)	9	114	120½	2578
44	(Azerbaijan) Eltaj Safarli	2709	1 (W 186)	½ (B 155)	1 (W 49)	½ (B 30)	½ (W 143)	0 (B 50)	½ (W 33)	½ (B 97)	1 (W 104)	0 (B 15)	1 (W 123)	1 (B 68)	½ (W 51)	0 (B 17)	1 (W 73)	9	113	118½	2601
45	(India) Adhiban Baskaran	2607	0 (B 176)	1 (W 152)	1 (B 86)	1 (W 150)	0 (B 13)	0 (W 121)	1 (B 178)	1 (W 145)	1 (B 102)	½ (W 25)	0 (B 20)	1 (W 59)	½ (W 57)	0 (B 19)	1 (W 83)	9	110½	116	2591
46	(Russia) Ernesto Inarkiev	2701	½ (B 132)	1 (W 165)	0 (B 107)	½ (W 136)	½ (B 163)	1 (W 129)	½ (B 97)	½ (W 98)	1 (B 153)	½ (W 34)	0 (B 2)	1 (W 50)	½ (B 37)	1 (W 70)	½ (B 33)	9	110	116	2540
47	(Belarus) Vladislav Kovalev	2597	1 (B 193)	0 (W 28)	1 (W 139)	½ (B 76)	½ (W 79)	0 (B 31)	1 (W 122)	½ (B 11)	½ (W 91)	0 (B 61)	1 (B 178)	0 (W 103)	1 (B 124)	1 (W 77)	1 (B 69)	9	110	115	2630
48	(Russia) Anton Demchenko	2636	½ (W 82)	½ (B 134)	0 (W 113)	1 (B 156)	½ (W 90)	½ (B 152)	1 (W 109)	½ (B 72)	½ (W 110)	1 (B 106)	½ (W 61)	1 (B 145)	0 (W 16)	1 (B 100)	½ (W 28)	9	108½	115	2557
49	(Georgia (country)) Giga Quparadze	2595	1 (B 175)	½ (W 11)	0 (B 44)	0 (W 144)	½ (B 183)	0 (W 178)	1 (B 185)	1 (W 134)	½ (B 176)	½ (W 77)	½ (B 122)	½ (W 81)	1 (B 121)	1 (W 140)	1 (B 71)	9	100	105½	2472
50	(Russia) Alexander Riazantsev	2594	1 (W 167)	½ (B 16)	1 (W 91)	½ (B 29)	½ (W 18)	1 (W 44)	0 (B 32)	½ (W 25)	½ (B 43)	½ (B 63)	0 (W 36)	0 (B 46)	1 (W 90)	½ (B 79)	1 (W 102)	8½	122½	128½	2699
51	(Germany) Daniel Fridman	2611	1 (B 207)	1 (W 23)	½ (B 20)	½ (W 13)	½ (B 57)	½ (W 102)	0 (B 21)	0 (W 37)	½ (B 86)	1 (W 126)	1 (B 81)	1 (W 43)	½ (B 44)	½ (W 52)	0 (B 25)	8½	122	129	2651
52	(Ukraine) Alexander Zubov	2688	1 (B 178)	1 (W 119)	1 (B 176)	½ (W 28)	½ (B 8)	½ (W 13)	½ (W 99)	1 (B 121)	0 (W 1)	0 (B 5)	½ (W 40)	½ (B 22)	1 (W 56)	½ (B 51)	0 (B 23)	8½	122	127½	2646
53	(Russia) Pavel Tregubov	2507	½ (W 76)	1 (B 83)	1 (W 55)	0 (B 16)	1 (W 58)	0 (B 69)	0 (B 36)	1 (W 85)	1 (B 74)	1 (W 71)	0 (B 19)	1 (W 38)	0 (B 25)	1 (W 64)	0 (B 20)	8½	121½	129½	2677
54	(Russia) Alexandr Predke	2637	1 (W 122)	½ (B 66)	1 (W 168)	0 (B 12)	1 (W 82)	1 (W 21)	½ (B 7)	0 (W 14)	½ (B 55)	0 (B 9)	1 (W 108)	½ (B 101)	½ (W 100)	½ (B 72)	½ (W 63)	8½	119	125	2625
55	(United Arab Emirates) Salem Saleh	2717	½ (B 87)	1 (W 126)	0 (B 53)	½ (W 177)	1 (B 166)	1 (W 92)	½ (B 22)	½ (W 75)	½ (W 54)	½ (B 40)	1 (W 73)	½ (B 30)	½ (W 17)	½ (B 58)	0 (W 26)	8½	117	122½	2597
56	(Kazakhstan) Azamat Utegaliyev	2564	0 (B 1)	1 (W 160)	1 (B 195)	½ (W 43)	½ (B 59)	1 (W 35)	½ (B 57)	0 (W 19)	0 (B 38)	1 (W 144)	½ (B 125)	1 (W 71)	0 (B 52)	½ (W 103)	1 (B 114)	8½	116	121	2650
57	(Armenia) Gabriel Sargissian	2715	½ (W 109)	1 (B 149)	1 (W 157)	½ (B 68)	½ (W 51)	½ (B 80)	½ (W 56)	½ (B 73)	1 (W 84)	½ (W 33)	½ (B 69)	½ (W 64)	½ (B 45)	0 (W 35)	½ (B 37)	8½	115	121½	2605
58	(Russia) Maxim Turov	2647	½ (W 161)	1 (B 147)	1 (W 66)	0 (W 8)	0 (B 53)	0 (B 108)	1 (W 113)	1 (B 90)	½ (W 106)	½ (B 110)	1 (W 135)	½ (W 37)	1 (B 67)	½ (W 55)	0 (B 18)	8½	113	119½	2559
59	(Russia) Kirill Alekseenko	2697	1 (W 156)	½ (B 67)	0 (W 33)	1 (B 149)	½ (W 56)	½ (B 85)	1 (W 110)	½ (B 34)	½ (W 15)	0 (B 72)	1 (W 97)	0 (B 45)	0 (W 89)	1 (B 127)	1 (W 100)	8½	112½	119	2562
60	(India) Vidit Gujrathi	2668	½ (B 37)	1 (W 174)	½ (B 150)	0 (W 34)	½ (B 98)	1 (W 163)	½ (B 81)	1 (W 176)	½ (B 70)	½ (W 99)	½ (B 67)	1 (W 112)	½ (B 23)	(W 31)	0 (B 13)	8½	111	116½	2543
61	(Russia) Evgeny Tomashevsky	2714	½ (B 151)	½ (W 87)	½ (B 163)	½ (W 127)	1 (B 136)	½ (W 177)	½ (B 179)	1 (W 92)	0 (B 35)	1 (W 47)	½ (B 48)	½ (W 75)	½ (B 33)	1 (W 112)	0 (B 27)	8½	109	114½	2584
62	(Egypt) Ahmed Adly	2643	1 (B 120)	0 (W 176)	1 (B 87)	½ (W 37)	0 (B 70)	0 (W 98)	½ (B 86)	1 (W 151)	½ (B 126)	1 (W 153)	½ (B 88)	0 (W 77)	½ (B 97)	1 (W 109)	1 (B 112)	8½	106	111½	2505
63	(Poland) Radosław Wojtaszek	2724	0 (B 181)	0 (W 144)	0 (B 192)	1 (W 203)	1 (B 140)	1 (W 151)	1 (B 132)	½ (W 40)	1 (B 129)	½ (W 50)	0 (B 35)	½ (B 89)	1 (W 88)	½ (W 34)	½ (B 54)	8½	104½	108	2534
64	(Serbia) Miloš Perunović	2599	0 (B 148)	1 (W 140)	½ (B 183)	0 (W 70)	1 (B 165)	½ (W 145)	1 (B 164)	0 (W 81)	1 (B 124)	1 (W 102)	1 (W 76)	½ (B 57)	0 (W 36)	0 (B 53)	1 (W 117)	8½	104	109½	2510
65	(Venezuela) Eduardo Iturrizaga	2596	0 (B 70)	1 (W 120)	0 (B 164)	1 (W 178)	1 (B 150)	0 (W 146)	0 (B 176)	1 (W 139)	½ (B 77)	½ (W 86)	1 (B 107)	½ (B 79)	½ (W 102)	½ (W 81)	1 (B 103)	8½	101½	107	2520
66	(India) Gukesh D	1799	1 (-)	½ (W 54)	0 (B 58)	0 (B 106)	½ (W 131)	0 (B 138)	0 (W 156)	1 (B 161)	1 (W 183)	0 (B 109)	1 (W 186)	½ (B 127)	1 (W 113)	1 (B 155)	1 (W 104)	8½	100	105½	2552
67	(India) Aravindh Chithambaram	2508	1 (B 25)	½ (W 59)	0 (B 39)	1 (W 130)	1 (B 125)	1 (W 36)	0 (W 20)	½ (B 83)	1 (W 42)	0 (B 10)	(W 60)	½ (B 26)	0 (W 58)	½ (B 75)	½ (W 84)	8	122	129	2672
68	(Spain) Francisco Vallejo Pons	2636	1 (B 192)	1 (W 195)	½ (B 13)	½ (W 57)	½ (B 23)	½ (W 24)	1 (B 146)	½ (W 3)	½ (B 8)	½ (W 20)	0 (B 21)	0 (W 44)	1 (B 128)	0 (W 37)	½ (B 92)	8	122	127	2682
69	(Russia) Aleksandr Rakhmanov	2686	0 (B 107)	1 (W 178)	1 (B 181)	1 (W 128)	½ (B 34)	1 (W 53)	½ (W 1)	½ (B 99)	½ (W 4)	½ (B 8)	½ (W 57)	½ (B 72)	½ (B 30)	0 (B 22)	0 (W 47)	08	121	126½	2617
70	(India) Nihal Sarin	2292	1 (W 65)	0 (B 35)	½ (W 106)	1 (B 64)	1 (W 62)	0 (B 39)	1 (W 96)	½ (B 36)	½ (W 60)	½ (W 38)	0 (B 146)	1 (B 73)	½ (W 84)	0 (B 46)	½ (W 75)	8	118½	126	2646
71	(Czech Republic) Viktor Láznička	2678	1 (B 185)	1 (W 181)	½ (W 31)	0 (B 14)	1 (W 113)	1 (B 107)	½ (W 8)	0 (B 1)	½ (W 34)	0 (B 53)	½ (W 110)	0 (B 56)	1 (W 106)	1 (B 101)	0 (W 49)	8	118	123½	2615
72	(Russia) Jakov Geller	2536	0 (W 29)	0 (B 118)	1 (B 203)	1 (W 190)	1 (B 11)	0 (W 74)	1 (B 114)	½ (W 48)	1 (B 17)	1 (W 59)	½ (B 25)	½ (W 69)	0 (B 32)	½ (W 54)	0 (B 38)	8	118	121½	2621
73	(Armenia) Zaven Andriasian	2633	1 (B 160)	½ (W 121)	0 (B 3)	1 (W 165)	½ (B 37)	1 (W 77)	½ (B 24)	½ (W 57)	½ (B 21)	½ (W 23)	0 (B 55)	0 (W 70)	1 (B 166)	1 (W 99)	0 (B 44)	8	117	123	2606
74	(Russia) Alexey Sarana	2618	1 (W 94)	½ (W 21)	0 (B 7)	1 (B 134)	½ (W 121)	1 (B 72)	½ (W 4)	0 (B 5)	0 (W 53)	0 (B 108)	1 (W 163)	1 (B 113)	½ (W 79)	½ (B 105)	½ (W 87)	8	117	123	2589
75	(Egypt) Bassem Amin	2610	1 (W 162)	0 (B 5)	1 (W 133)	1 (B 105)	½ (W 29)	½ (B 16)	½ (W 31)	½ (B 55)	0 (W 76)	½ (B 145)	1 (W 118)	½ (B 61)	0 (B 13)	½ (W 67)	½ (B 70)	8	116½	123	2593
76	(Belarus) Sergei Zhigalko	2699	½ (B 53)	1 (W 132)	½ (B 37)	½ (W 47)	½ (B 89)	½ (W 97)	½ (B 98)	1 (W 107)	1 (B 75)	0 (W 3)	0 (B 64)	½ (W 92)	0 (B 112)	1 (W 116)	½ (W 85)	8	115	122	2581
77	(Armenia) Manuel Petrosyan	2378	½ (W 30)	0 (B 157)	1 (W 159)	½ (B 84)	1 (W 116)	0 (B 73)	1 (W 100)	0 (B 41)	½ (W 65)	½ (B 49)	1 (W 106)	1 (B 62)	0 (W 26)	0 (B 47)	1 (W 123)	8	114½	121	2608
78	(Russia) Ivan Popov	2607	1 (W 158)	½ (B 79)	½ (W 4)	0 (W 21)	1 (B 153)	1 (B 109)	½ (W 18)	0 (B 31)	½ (W 105)	½ (W 81)	½ (B 103)	0 (B 100)	½ (W 108)	½ (B 86)	1 (W 133)	8	113½	120	2598
79	(United States) Gata Kamsky	2755	1 (B 127)	½ (W 78)	½ (B 22)	½ (W 104)	½ (B 47)	½ (W 40)	½ (B 143)	½ (W 179)	½ (B 112)	½ (W 88)	½ (B 98)	½ (W 65)	½ (B 74)	(W 50)	½ (B 95)	8	112½	118	2597
80	(Russia) Nikita Vitiugov	2631	1 (B 164)	½ (W 3)	0 (B 6)	1 (W 183)	1 (B 176)	½ (W 57)	½ (B 102)	½ (W 24)	0 (W 10)	½ (B 105)	0 (W 145)	1 (B 86)	0 (W 87)	1 (B 147)	½ (W 82)	8	112	117½	2579
81	(Russia) Volodar Murzin	2341	0 (W 123)	½ (B 159)	1 (W 131)	½ (B 157)	1 (W 100)	½ (B 84)	½ (W 60)	1 (B 64)	0 (W 26)	½ (B 78)	0 (W 51)	½ (B 49)	1 (W 138)	½ (B 65)	(W 96)	8	111	117½	2604
82	(China) Xu Xiangyu	2441	½ (B 48)	1 (W 137)	0 (B 42)	1 (W 179)	0 (B 54)	½ (W 130)	1 (B 95)	½ (W 154)	0 (B 2)	1 (W 129)	0 (B 17)	½ (B 123)	½ (W 104)	1 (W 143)	½ (B 80)	8	111	116½	2623
83	(Russia) Maksim Chigaev	2669	½ (B 174)	0 (W 53)	1 (B 132)	½ (W 163)	1 (B 126)	1 (W 127)	½ (B 34)	½ (W 67)	1 (B 37)	0 (W 24)	0 (B 99)	½ (W 128)	½ (B 92)	1 (W 110)	0 (B 45)	8	110	116	2556
84	(Russia) Evgeniy Najer	2626	½ (B 117)	1 (W 153)	0 (B 8)	½ (W 77)	1 (B 185)	½ (W 81)	1 (B 144)	½ (W 102)	0 (B 57)	0 (W 37)	1 (B 149)	1 (W 121)	½ (B 70)	0 (W 33)	½ (B 67)	8	110	115½	2493
85	(Russia) Daniil Yuffa	2587	1 (B 196)	0 (W 13)	1 (B 148)	1 (W 146)	0 (B 20)	½ (W 59)	0 (B 25)	0 (B 53)	1 (W 90)	½ (W 176)	½ (B 124)	1 (W 144)	0 (B 43)	1 (W 145)	½ (B 76)	8	110	115	2549
86	(Turkey) Emre Can	2516	0 (W 20)	1 (B 201)	0 (W 45)	1 (B 197)	½ (W 26)	0 (B 96)	½ (W 62)	1 (B 111)	½ (W 51)	½ (B 65)	½ (B 143)	0 (W 80)	1 (B 148)	½ (W 78)	1 (B 125)	8	109	112	2564
87	(Spain) Iván Salgado López	2527	½ (W 55)	½ (B 61)	0 (W 62)	½ (B 115)	½ (W 167)	½ (B 9)	0 (B 125)	½ (W 150)	1 (B 190)	1 (W 193)	1 (B 114)	½ (W 88)	1 (B 80)	0 (W 27)	½ (B 74)	8	108½	113½	2587
88	(Russia) Vadim Zvjaginsev	2603	0 (W 172)	0 (B 122)	1 (W 191)	½ (B 133)	1 (W 161)	1 (B 90)	1 (W 105)	½ (W 43)	0 (B 25)	½ (B 79)	½ (W 62)	½ (B 87)	0 (B 63)	½ (W 98)	1 (B 140)	8	108	113½	2542
89	(Russia) David Paravyan	2588	½ (W 202)	1 (B 188)	0 (W 18)	1 (B 168)	½ (W 76)	½ (B 91)	0 (B 43)	½ (W 126)	0 (B 145)	1 (W 132)	1 (B 148)	½ (W 63)	1 (B 59)	½ (W 38)	0 (B 39)	8	108	111	2566
90	(India) Vishnu Prasanna	2438	1 (B 154)	0 (W 19)	0 (B 128)	1 (W 181)	½ (B 48)	0 (W 88)	1 (B 27)	0 (W 58)	0 (B 85)	1 (W 171)	1 (B 129)	½ (W 143)	0 (B 50)	1 (W 166)	1 (B 137)	8	107	112½	2606
91	(Russia) Dmitry Jakovenko	2748	1 (B 99)	½ (W 179)	0 (B 50)	1 (W 180)	½ (B 40)	½ (W 89)	½ (B 177)	½ (W 143)	½ (B 47)	½ (W 112)	0 (B 22)	1 (W 155)	0 (B 27)	½ (W 128)	1 (W 105)	8	107	112½	2584
92	(Russia) Mikhail Kobalia	2578	½ (W 188)	½ (B 173)	½ (W 122)	½ (B 172)	1 (W 94)	0 (B 55)	1 (W 167)	0 (B 61)	1 (W 152)	0 (B 36)	1 (W 117)	½ (B 76)	½ (W 83)	½ (B 102)	½ (W 68)	8	104½	110	2538
93	(Russia) Vladimir Potkin	2560	0 (B 23)	½ (W 162)	½ (B 115)	0 (W 124)	½ (B 158)	1 (W 169)	1 (B 192)	0 (B 9)	½ (W 117)	1 (B 94)	0 (W 121)	1 (W 176)	1 (B 130)	1 (W 125)	0 (B 41)	8	104	109	2522
94	(India) Harsha Bharathakoti	2418	0 (B 74)	1 (W 171)	1 (B 129)	0 (W 17)	0 (B 92)	1 (W 166)	0 (B 112)	½ (W 95)	½ (B 163)	0 (W 93)	1 (B 165)	½ (W 119)	½ (B 131)	1 (W 126)	1 (B 128)	8	102½	108½	2571
95	(Turkey) Vahap Șanal	2597	½ (W 173)	1 (B 202)	0 (W 12)	0 (B 122)	½ (W 134)	1 (B 133)	0 (W 82)	½ (B 94)	1 (W 192)	½ (B 167)	½ (W 147)	1 (B 118)	1 (B 146)	0 (W 43)	½ (W 79)	8	102	105	2497
96	(Serbia) Ivan Ivanišević	2617	0 (B 150)	1 (W 185)	1 (B 151)	½ (W 176)	0 (B 144)	1 (W 86)	0 (B 70)	1 (W 163)	1 (B 98)	0 (W 21)	0 (B 112)	½ (W 97)	½ (B 147)	1 (W 120)	½ (B 81)	8	100½	106	2494
97	(India) S. P. Sethuraman	2560	½ (W 4)	0 (B 18)	1 (W 141)	½ (B 9)	1 (W 173)	½ (B 76)	½ (W 46)	½ (W 44)	1 (B 154)	0 (W 43)	0 (B 59)	½ (B 96)	½ (W 62)	½ (B 111)	½ (W 101)	7½	118½	124½	2653
98	(Russia) Konstantin Sakaev	2529	0 (B 103)	1 (W 203)	½ (W 10)	½ (B 26)	½ (W 60)	1 (B 62)	½ (W 76)	½ (B 46)	0 (W 96)	1 (B 104)	½ (W 79)	0 (B 42)	½ (W 111)	½ (B 88)	½ (W 106)	7½	116½	120	2658
99	(Russia) Nikita Petrov	2543	0 (W 91)	½ (B 199)	1 (W 202)	1 (B 10)	1 (W 114)	1 (W 19)	½ (B 52)	½ (W 69)	0 (B 24)	½ (B 60)	1 (W 83)	0 (B 11)	0 (W 42)	0 (B 73)	½ (W 111)	7½	115½	118½	2656
100	(Kazakhstan) Rinat Jumabayev	2558	½ (B 6)	0 (W 146)	1 (B 117)	½ (W 11)	0 (B 81)	1 (W 185)	0 (B 77)	1 (W 122)	½ (B 167)	1 (W 137)	½ (B 39)	1 (W 78)	½ (B 54)	0 (W 48)	0 (B 59)	7½	114	119½	2584
101	(Kazakhstan) Anaur Ismagambetov	2420	½ (B 130)	0 (W 2)	0 (B 177)	0 (W 27)	1 (B 202)	1 (B 189)	1 (W 159)	1 (W 128)	1 (B 22)	1 (W 39)	0 (B 23)	½ (W 54)	0 (B 41)	0 (W 71)	½ (B 97)	7½	112½	115½	2618
102	(Germany) Georg Meier	2710	½ (W 149)	1 (B 109)	½ (W 123)	1 (B 116)	½ (W 30)	½ (B 51)	½ (W 80)	½ (B 84)	0 (W 45)	0 (B 64)	½ (W 105)	1 (B 135)	½ (B 65)	½ (W 92)	0 (B 50)	7½	112	118½	2587
103	(Russia) Maxim Matlakov	2726	1 (W 98)	0 (B 15)	1 (W 186)	0 (B 143)	0 (W 109)	1 (B 156)	1 (W 135)	½ (W 112)	0 (B 40)	1 (B 121)	½ (W 78)	1 (B 47)	0 (W 22)	½ (B 56)	0 (W 65)	7½	111	116½	2569
104	(India) Krishnan Sasikiran	2601	1 (W 191)	0 (B 31)	1 (W 182)	½ (B 79)	½ (W 4)	½ (B 105)	0 (B 23)	1 (W 108)	0 (B 44)	0 (W 98)	1 (B 153)	(W 124)	½ (B 82)	1 (W 122)	0 (B 66)	7½	110½	116	2556
105	(India) Raunak Sadhwani	2358	0 (B 22)	1 (W 166)	1 (B 119)	0 (W 75)	1 (B 128)	½ (W 104)	0 (B 88)	1 (W 114)	½ (B 78)	½ (W 80)	½ (B 102)	1 (W 130)	0 (B 39)	½ (W 74)	0 (B 91)	7½	110	116	2630
106	(Russia) Roman Kezin	2572	0 (B 187)	1 (W 192)	½ (B 70)	1 (W 66)	0 (B 43)	0 (B 10)	1 (W 160)	1 (W 148)	½ (B 58)	0 (W 48)	0 (B 77)	1 (W 107)	0 (B 71)	1 (W 121)	½ (B 98)	7½	109	114	2454
107	(Uzbekistan) Shamsiddin Vokhidov	2486	1 (W 69)	½ (B 114)	1 (W 46)	½ (B 18)	½ (W 36)	0 (W 71)	½ (B 154)	0 (B 76)	0 (W 123)	1 (B 157)	0 (W 65)	0 (B 106)	1 (W 175)	½ (B 138)	1 (W 155)	7½	108	114	2642
108	(Kazakhstan) Rustam Khusnutdinov	2532	0 (B 13)	1 (W 196)	0 (B 24)	½ (W 148)	1 (B 187)	1 (W 58)	0 (B 19)	0 (B 104)	1 (W 168)	1 (W 74)	0 (B 54)	½ (W 154)	½ (B 78)	0 (W 114)	1 (B 162)	7½	107	112	2558
109	(India) Srinath Narayanan	2526	½ (B 57)	0 (W 102)	1 (B 142)	½ (W 25)	1 (B 103)	0 (W 78)	0 (B 48)	1 (W 193)	0 (B 125)	1 (W 66)	0 (B 130)	½ (W 148)	1 (B 144)	0 (B 62)	1 (W 152)	7½	107	112	2556
110	(Germany) Matthias Blübaum	2561	0 (B 21)	0 (W 164)	1 (B 193)	1 (W 169)	½ (B 145)	1 (W 125)	0 (B 59)	1 (W 144)	½ (B 48)	½ (W 58)	½ (B 71)	0 (W 39)	1 (B 154)	0 (B 83)	½ (W 115)	7½	106½	111½	2582
111	(Canada) Eric Hansen	2604	1 (B 145)	½ (W 8)	½ (B 146)	0 (W 23)	0 (B 124)	0 (W 132)	1 (B 150)	0 (W 86)	1 (B 174)	½ (W 133)	1 (B 126)	½ (W 147)	½ (B 98)	½ (W 97)	½ (B 99)	7½	105	111	2553
112	(Armenia) Arman Pashikian	2593	0 (B 195)	½ (W 169)	½ (B 153)	0 (W 185)	1 (W 120)	1 (B 134)	1 (W 94)	½ (B 103)	½ (W 79)	½ (B 91)	1 (W 96)	0 (B 60)	1 (W 76)	0 (B 61)	0 (W 62)	7½	105	110	2593
113	(Poland) Grzegorz Gajewski	2516	0 (B 43)	1 (W 197)	1 (B 48)	½ (W 125)	0 (B 71)	0 (W 154)	0 (B 58)	1 (W 172)	1 (B 188)	0 (W 22)	1 (B 179)	0 (W 74)	0 (B 66)	1 (W 148)	1 (B 143)	7½	103½	108	2507
114	(Russia) Artyom Timofeev	2648	1 (W 206)	½ (W 107)	1 (B 144)	0 (W 6)	0 (B 99)	½ (B 135)	0 (W 72)	0 (B 105)	1 (W 185)	1 (B 186)	0 (W 87)	½ (W 178)	1 (B 167)	1 (B 108)	0 (W 56)	7½	102	107½	2491
115	(Russia) Konstantin Mesropov	2431	0 (B 17)	½ (B 170)	½ (W 93)	½ (W 87)	0 (B 179)	1 (W 180)	0 (B 129)	1 (W 119)	½ (B 128)	½ (W 163)	0 (B 27)	½ (W 126)	1 (B 184)	1 (W 131)	½ (B 110)	7½	101	106½	2565
116	(Russia) Boris Savchenko	2569	1 (B 200)	1 (W 43)	0 (B 1)	0 (W 102)	0 (B 77)	1 (W 183)	0 (B 145)	0 (W 178)	1 (B 139)	0 (W 122)	½ (B 184)	1 (W 153)	1 (B 132)	0 (B 76)	1 (W 156)	7½	100½	104½	2547
117	(Uzbekistan) Nodirbek Abdusattorov	2418	½ (W 84)	0 (B 30)	0 (W 100)	0 (B 135)	1 (B 188)	0 (W 149)	1 (B 180)	1 (W 171)	½ (B 93)	1 (W 165)	0 (B 92)	1 (W 137)	½ (B 143)	1 (W 154)	0 (B 64)	7½	100	105½	2581
118	(Turkmenistan) Saparmyrat Atabayev	2258	0 (B 40)	1 (W 72)	0 (B 34)	0 (W 151)	0 (B 132)	1 (W 140)	1 (B 165)	1 (W 181)	½ (B 177)	1 (W 179)	0 (B 75)	0 (W 95)	0 (B 137)	1 (W 164)	1 (B 149)	7½	99	104½	2554
119	(Germany) Alexander Donchenko	2567	1 (W 204)	0 (B 52)	0 (W 105)	0 (B 182)	0 (W 160)	1 (B 142)	½ (W 133)	0 (B 115)	½ (W 175)	1 (B 188)	1 (W 185)	½ (B 94)	0 (W 122)	1 (B 150)	1 (W 147)	7½	94½	97½	2411
120	(Israel) Tal Baron	2455	0 (W 62)	0 (B 65)	1 (W 204)	0 (W 166)	0 (B 112)	0 (B 196)	1 (W 175)	1 (B 170)	0 (W 194)	½ (B 181)	1 (W 188)	1 (B 163)	1 (W 136)	0 (B 96)	1 (W 157)	7½	92	97	2483
121	(Azerbaijan) Aydin Suleymanli	2086	1 (W 138)	½ (B 73)	1 (W 26)	0 (W 19)	½ (B 74)	1 (B 45)	1 (W 42)	0 (W 52)	0 (B 41)	0 (W 103)	1 (B 93)	0 (B 84)	0 (W 49)	0 (B 106)	1 (W 163)	7	117½	123½	2634
122	(Russia) Roman Yanchenko	2447	0 (B 54)	1 (W 88)	½ (B 92)	1 (W 95)	½ (B 35)	0 (W 22)	0 (B 47)	0 (B 100)	1 (W 131)	1 (B 116)	½ (W 49)	0 (W 27)	1 (B 119)	0 (B 104)	½ (W 138)	7	115½	122½	2595
123	(Russia) Semen Khanin	2602	1 (B 81)	½ (W 7)	½ (B 102)	½ (W 24)	0 (B 3)	½ (W 164)	0 (B 124)	1 (W 183)	1 (B 107)	½ (W 125)	0 (B 44)	½ (W 82)	0 (B 140)	1 (W 167)	0 (B 77)	7	111	116½	2565
124	(Russia) Sergey Drygalov	2444	0 (W 35)	½ (B 138)	½ (W 170)	1 (B 93)	1 (W 111)	0 (B 41)	1 (W 123)	0 (B 42)	0 (W 64)	1 (B 194)	½ (W 85)	½ (B 104)	0 (W 47)	½ (B 157)	½ (W 127)	7	109	114	2602
125	(Poland) Bartosz Soćko	2691	1 (W 184)	1 (B 139)	0 (W 15)	½ (B 113)	0 (W 67)	0 (B 110)	1 (W 87)	½ (B 136)	1 (W 109)	½ (B 123)	½ (W 56)	1 (B 138)	0 (W 40)	0 (B 93)	0 (W 86)	7	108½	114	2549
126	(Russia) Alexandr Triapishko	2531	½ (W 18)	0 (B 55)	1 (W 199)	½ (B 41)	0 (W 83)	½ (B 173)	1 (W 172)	½ (B 89)	½ (W 62)	0 (B 51)	0 (W 111)	½ (B 115)	1 (W 134)	0 (B 94)	1 (W 167)	7	107½	111½	2535
127	(Russia) Vladislav Nozdrachev	2558	0 (W 79)	1 (B 158)	½ (W 173)	½ (B 61)	1 (W 9)	0 (B 83)	0 (B 11)	½ (W 164)	0 (B 148)	1 (W 168)	½ (B 137)	½ (W 66)	1 (B 178)	0 (W 59)	½ (B 124)	7	106	111½	2558
128	(Serbia) Aleksandar Inđić	2572	1 (W 201)	0 (B 20)	1 (W 90)	0 (B 69)	0 (W 105)	½ (B 160)	1 (W 182)	0 (B 101)	½ (W 115)	1 (B 152)	1 (W 167)	½ (B 83)	0 (W 68)	½ (B 91)	0 (W 94)	7	104½	107½	2512
129	(Russia) Evgeny Romanov	2571	1 (W 197)	0 (B 32)	0 (W 94)	½ (B 152)	1 (W 162)	0 (B 46)	1 (W 115)	1 (B 168)	0 (W 63)	0 (B 82)	0 (W 90)	½ (B 134)	1 (W 161)	0 (B 133)	1 (B 145)	7	104	108½	2491
130	(Spain) Alvar Alonso Rosell	2628	½ (W 101)	1 (B 141)	0 (W 14)	0 (B 67)	1 (W 184)	½ (B 82)	0 (W 152)	½ (B 147)	½ (W 133)	1 (B 134)	1 (W 109)	0 (B 105)	0 (W 93)	½ (W 149)	½ (B 132)	7	103½	109	2513
131	(Russia) Dmitry Frolyanov	2527	½ (B 146)	0 (W 6)	0 (B 81)	1 (W 142)	½ (B 66)	1 (W 193)	0 (B 35)	0 (W 167)	0 (B 122)	1 (W 169)	½ (W 134)	1 (B 150)	½ (W 94)	0 (B 115)	1 (W 168)	7	103½	108½	2455
132	(Vietnam) Trần Tuấn Minh	2511	½ (W 46)	0 (B 76)	0 (W 83)	½ (B 199)	1 (W 118)	1 (B 111)	0 (W 63)	0 (B 157)	1 (W 173)	0 (B 89)	½ (W 150)	1 (B 141)	0 (W 116)	1 (B 158)	½ (W 130)	7	103½	107½	2541
133	(Norway) Johan-Sebastian Christiansen	2492	0 (B 19)	1 (W 154)	0 (B 75)	½ (W 88)	½ (B 137)	0 (W 95)	½ (B 119)	1 (W 191)	½ (B 130)	½ (B 111)	0 (W 155)	1 (W 179)	½ (B 135)	1 (W 129)	0 (B 78)	7	103	108½	2605
134	(Kazakhstan) Murtas Kazhgaleyev	2455	½ (B 137)	½ (W 48)	½ (B 40)	0 (W 74)	½ (B 95)	0 (W 112)	1 (B 166)	0 (B 49)	1 (W 181)	0 (W 130)	½ (B 131)	(W 129)	0 (B 126)	1 (W 180)	1 (B 171)	7	103	108½	2586
135	(Poland) Kacper Piorun	2552	0 (B 8)	½ (W 145)	0 (B 162)	1 (W 117)	1 (B 139)	½ (W 114)	0 (B 103)	1 (W 190)	½ (B 146)	1 (W 154)	0 (B 58)	0 (W 102)	½ (W 133)	½ (B 152)	½ (W 142)	7	102	107½	2559
136	(Russia) Andrey Rychagov	2543	0 (B 28)	1 (W 193)	½ (B 187)	½ (B 46)	0 (W 61)	½ (W 150)	1 (B 158)	½ (W 125)	½ (B 137)	0 (W 17)	0 (B 154)	1 (W 183)	0 (B 120)	1 (W 176)	(B 141)	7	100	105	2544
137	(Azerbaijan) Namig Guliyev	2643	½ (W 134)	0 (B 82)	½ (W 184)	½ (B 173)	½ (W 133)	½ (B 182)	½ (W 147)	1 (B 156)	½ (W 136)	0 (B 100)	½ (W 127)	0 (B 117)	1 (W 118)	1 (B 151)	0 (W 90)	7	97½	103	2479
138	(Russia) Vladimir Belov	2581	0 (B 121)	½ (W 124)	½ (B 169)	½ (W 139)	0 (B 192)	1 (W 66)	1 (B 174)	0 (W 153)	1 (B 164)	½ (W 148)	1 (B 176)	0 (W 125)	0 (B 81)	½ (W 107)	½ (B 122)	7	94½	99½	2425
139	(Russia) Andrei Deviatkin	2477	1 (B 205)	0 (W 125)	0 (B 47)	½ (B 138)	0 (W 135)	½ (B 170)	1 (W 194)	0 (B 65)	0 (W 116)	½ (B 159)	½ (W 158)	0 (B 151)	1 (W 199)	1 (B 195)	1 (W 166)	7	94½	98½	2518
140	(Russia) Ilia Iljiushenok	2466	0 (W 26)	0 (B 64)	0 (B 197)	1 (W 188)	0 (W 63)	0 (B 118)	1 (B 203)	0 (W 187)	1 (B 202)	1 (W 180)	1 (W 194)	1 (B 170)	1 (W 123)	0 (B 49)	0 (W 88)	7	93½	96½	2429
141	(Switzerland) Noël Studer	2405	½ (B 2)	0 (W 130)	0 (B 97)	½ (W 171)	0 (B 181)	1 (W 195)	0 (B 151)	1 (W 166)	0 (B 149)	½ (B 156)	1 (W 182)	0 (W 132)	1 (B 194)	1 (B 170)	½ (W 136)	7	92½	97½	2545
142	(Croatia) Ivan Vihor	2334	0 (B 143)	½ (B 189)	0 (W 109)	0 (B 131)	1 (W 198)	0 (W 119)	0 (B 169)	0 (B 184)	1 (W 203)	1 (B 160)	0 (W 156)	1 (B 159)	1 (W 186)	1 (W 178)	½ (B 135)	7	87½	91	2491
143	(Israel) Evgeny Postny	2598	1 (W 142)	1 (W 24)	0 (B 32)	1 (W 103)	½ (B 44)	0 (B 29)	½ (W 79)	½ (B 91)	0 (W 9)	½ (B 147)	½ (W 86)	½ (B 90)	½ (W 117)	0 (B 82)	0 (W 113)	6½	116	122½	2625
144	(Russia) Andrey Tsvetkov	2241	½ (W 33)	1 (B 63)	0 (W 114)	1 (B 49)	1 (W 96)	0 (B 4)	0 (W 84)	0 (B 110)	1 (W 155)	0 (B 56)	1 (W 177)	0 (B 85)	0 (W 109)	0 (B 156)	1 (W 189)	6½	110	115½	2605
145	(Russia) Dmitry Tsoi	2375	0 (W 111)	½ (B 135)	(W 189)	1 (B 194)	½ (W 110)	½ (B 64)	1 (W 116)	0 (B 45)	1 (W 89)	½ (W 75)	1 (B 80)	0 (W 48)	0 (B 38)	0 (B 85)	0 (W 129)	6½	109½	114½	2593
146	(Armenia) Tigran L. Petrosian	2721	½ (W 131)	1 (B 100)	½ (W 111)	0 (B 85)	1 (W 186)	1 (B 65)	0 (W 68)	0 (B 33)	½ (W 135)	1 (B 177)	1 (W 70)	0 (B 17)	0 (W 95)	0 (-)	0 (-)	6½	109	114½	2558
147	(Israel) Alexander Huzman	2484	½ (B 36)	0 (W 58)	0 (B 25)	1 (W 175)	0 (B 154)	1 (W 187)	½ (B 137)	½ (W 130)	1 (B 27)	½ (W 143)	(B 95)	½ (B 111)	½ (W 96)	0 (W 80)	0 (B 119)	6½	108½	114	2602
148	(Russia) Rudik Makarian	2334	1 (W 64)	0 (B 38)	0 (W 85)	½ (B 108)	1 (W 189)	1 (B 155)	0 (W 26)	0 (B 106)	1 (W 127)	½ (B 138)	0 (W 89)	½ (B 109)	0 (W 86)	0 (B 113)	1 (W 186)	6½	107	112½	2571
149	(Turkey) Mustafa Yılmaz	2525	½ (B 102)	0 (W 57)	1 (B 175)	0 (W 59)	0 (W 10)	1 (B 117)	0 (W 9)	½ (B 158)	1 (W 141)	1 (B 150)	0 (W 84)	0 (B 167)	1 (W 192)	½ (B 130)	0 (W 118)	6½	106½	111½	2536
150	(Canada) Artiom Samsonkin	2406	1 (W 96)	½ (B 26)	½ (W 60)	0 (B 45)	0 (W 65)	½ (B 136)	0 (W 111)	½ (B 87)	1 (B 151)	0 (W 149)	(B 132)	0 (W 131)	1 (B 183)	0 (W 119)	1 (B 184)	6½	106	111½	2569
151	(Russia) Dmitry Kryakvin	2525	½ (W 61)	½ (B 10)	0 (W 96)	1 (B 118)	0 (W 41)	0 (B 63)	1 (W 141)	0 (B 62)	0 (W 150)	½ (B 158)	½ (B 191)	1 (W 139)	1 (B 168)	0 (W 137)	½ (B 154)	6½	106	111½	2552
152	(Russia) Pavel Potapov	2482	0 (B 39)	0 (B 45)	1 (W 200)	½ (W 129)	1 (B 27)	½ (W 48)	1 (B 130)	0 (W 35)	0 (B 92)	0 (W 128)	0 (B 166)	1 (W 193)	1 (B 177)	½ (W 135)	0 (B 109)	6½	105½	109½	2573
153	(Russia) Oleg Vastrukhin	2474	½ (W 41)	0 (B 84)	½ (W 112)	1 (B 170)	0 (W 78)	½ (B 159)	1 (W 155)	1 (B 138)	0 (W 46)	0 (B 62)	0 (W 104)	0 (B 116)	0 (W 189)	1 (B 181)	1 (W 187)	6½	102	107½	2596
154	(Russia) Saveliy Golubov	2635	0 (W 90)	0 (B 133)	1 (W 160)	½ (B 184)	1 (W 147)	1 (B 113)	½ (W 107)	½ (B 82)	0 (W 97)	0 (B 135)	1 (W 136)	(B 108)	0 (W 110)	0 (B 117)	½ (W 151)	6½	101½	107	2504
155	(Croatia) Marin Bosiočić	2575	1 (B 198)	½ (W 44)	0 (B 36)	1 (W 187)	0 (B 24)	0 (W 148)	0 (B 153)	1 (W 169)	0 (B 144)	1 (W 164)	1 (B 133)	0 (B 91)	1 (W 156)	0 (W 66)	0 (B 107)	6½	101½	106	2451
156	(Argentina) Pablo Zarnicki	2504	0 (B 59)	1 (W 200)	0 (B 43)	0 (W 48)	1 (B 195)	0 (W 103)	1 (B 66)	0 (W 137)	0 (B 193)	½ (W 141)	1 (B 142)	1 (W 164)	0 (B 155)	1 (W 144)	0 (B 116)	6½	99½	103½	2459
157	(Russia) Sergey Grigoriants	2603	½ (B 190)	1 (W 77)	0 (B 57)	½ (W 81)	½ (B 164)	½ (W 176)	0 (B 37)	1 (W 132)	0 (B 178)	0 (W 107)	(B 183)	½ (W 184)	1 (B 174)	½ (W 124)	0 (B 120)	6½	96	101½	2472
158	(Spain) Miguel Santos Ruiz	2379	0 (B 78)	0 (W 127)	½ (B 27)	½ (B 159)	½ (W 93)	1 (B 184)	0 (W 136)	½ (W 149)	0 (B 165)	½ (W 151)	½ (B 139)	1 (B 185)	½ (W 163)	0 (W 132)	1 (B 178)	6½	95½	101	2538
159	(Russia) Maxim Vavulin	2551	0 (B 7)	½ (W 81)	0 (B 77)	½ (W 158)	1 (B 190)	½ (W 153)	0 (B 101)	0 (W 192)	½ (B 169)	½ (W 139)	0 (B 164)	0 (W 142)	1 (B 188)	1 (W 182)	1 (B 176)	6½	94	99	2434
160	(Russia) Alexander Gutenev	2431	0 (W 73)	0 (B 56)	0 (B 154)	1 (W 201)	1 (B 119)	½ (W 128)	0 (B 106)	0 (W 27)	0 (B 171)	0 (W 142)	1 (B 204)	1 (W 187)	½ (B 180)	½ (W 165)	1 (B 179)	6½	93	96	2481
161	(South Korea) Alexey Kim	2464	½ (B 58)	0 (W 36)	0 (B 180)	1 (W 202)	0 (B 88)	0 (W 27)	½ (B 187)	0 (W 66)	1 (B 195)	0 (B 170)	1 (W 199)	1 (W 165)	0 (B 129)	½ (W 179)	1 (B 177)	6½	93	96	2474
162	(Russia) Igor Yagupov	2382	0 (B 75)	½ (B 93)	1 (W 135)	0 (W 40)	0 (B 129)	½ (W 165)	0 (B 181)	0 (B 194)	1 (W 196)	0 (W 166)	1 (B 202)	½ (B 186)	1 (W 182)	1 (B 189)	0 (W 108)	6½	90½	93½	2520
163	(Russia) Ivan Rozum	2542	0 (W 16)	1 (B 167)	½ (W 61)	½ (B 83)	½ (W 46)	0 (B 60)	1 (W 173)	0 (B 96)	½ (W 94)	½ (B 115)	0 (B 74)	0 (W 120)	½ (B 158)	1 (W 193)	0 (B 121)	6	107½	112½	2524
164	(Russia) Stefan Pogosyan	2426	0 (W 80)	1 (B 110)	1 (W 65)	0 (B 38)	½ (W 157)	½ (B 123)	0 (W 64)	½ (B 127)	0 (W 138)	0 (B 155)	1 (W 159)	0 (B 156)	1 (W 181)	0 (B 118)	½ (W 170)	6	102	107½	2578
165	(Russia) Alexey Reshetnikov	2524	½ (W 10)	0 (B 46)	1 (W 188)	0 (B 73)	0 (W 64)	½ (B 162)	0 (W 118)	1 (B 199)	1 (W 158)	0 (B 117)	0 (W 94)	0 (B 161)	1 (W 172)	½ (B 160)	½ (W 169)	6	102	106	2462
166	(Hungary) Róbert Ruck	2551	0 (W 12)	0 (B 105)	1 (W 196)	1 (B 120)	0 (W 55)	0 (B 94)	0 (W 134)	0 (B 141)	1 (W 199)	1 (B 162)	1 (W 152)	1 (B 175)	0 (W 73)	0 (B 90)	0 (B 139)	6	101	105	2467
167	(Belarus) Viachaslau Zarubitski	2273	0 (B 50)	0 (W 163)	½ (B 171)	1 (W 174)	½ (B 87)	1 (W 181)	0 (B 92)	1 (B 131)	½ (W 100)	½ (W 95)	0 (B 128)	1 (W 149)	0 (W 114)	0 (B 123)	0 (B 126)	6	99½	105	2563
168	(Lithuania) Valery Kazakouski	2375	1 (B 27)	½ (W 39)	0 (B 54)	0 (W 89)	1 (B 180)	0 (W 179)	1 (B 171)	0 (W 129)	0 (B 108)	0 (B 127)	1 (W 181)	½ (B 189)	0 (W 151)	1 (W 174)	0 (B 131)	6	98½	104	2572
169	(Mongolia) Tsegmediin Batchuluun	2448	0 (W 38)	½ (B 112)	½ (W 138)	0 (B 110)	½ (W 170)	0 (B 93)	1 (W 142)	0 (B 155)	½ (W 159)	0 (B 131)	½ (B 173)	1 (W 188)	½ (B 179)	½ (W 177)	(B 165)	6	95	100½	2535
170	(Russia) Klementy Sychev	2562	0 (B 3)	½ (W 115)	½ (B 124)	0 (W 153)	½ (B 169)	½ (W 139)	0 (B 190)	0 (W 120)	1 (B 191)	1 (W 161)	1 (B 193)	0 (W 140)	½ (B 176)	0 (W 141)	½ (B 164)	6	94	99	2456
171	(Ukraine) Eldar Gasanov	2560	0 (W 5)	0 (B 94)	½ (W 167)	½ (B 141)	1 (W 199)	½ (B 172)	0 (W 168)	0 (B 117)	1 (W 160)	0 (B 90)	0 (W 175)	½ (W 190)	1 (W 191)	1 (B 192)	0 (W 134)	6	94	98	2412
172	(Russia) Vitaly Gurvich	2348	1 (B 88)	½ (W 42)	0 (B 23)	½ (W 92)	0 (B 177)	½ (W 171)	0 (B 126)	0 (B 113)	½ (W 184)	0 (B 185)	0 (W 189)	1 (W 200)	0 (B 165)	1 (B 203)	1 (W 195)	6	92	95½	2515
173	(Austria) Felix Blohberger	2316	½ (B 95)	½ (W 92)	½ (B 127)	½ (W 137)	0 (B 97)	½ (W 126)	0 (B 163)	½ (W 174)	0 (B 132)	0 (B 184)	½ (W 169)	0 (B 181)	1 (W 198)	½ (W 190)	1 (B 194)	6	91	95½	2527
174	(Russia) Nikita Afanasiev	2480	½ (W 83)	0 (B 60)	0 (W 41)	0 (B 167)	1 (W 197)	1 (B 191)	0 (W 138)	½ (B 173)	0 (W 111)	0 (B 175)	1 (W 195)	1 (B 194)	0 (W 157)	0 (B 168)	1 (W 192)	6	91	95½	2473
175	(Kyrgyzstan) Melis Mamatov	2277	0 (W 49)	½ (B 194)	0 (W 149)	0 (B 147)	0 (B 191)	1 (W 198)	0 (B 120)	1 (W 189)	½ (B 119)	1 (W 174)	1 (B 171)	0 (W 166)	0 (B 107)	½ (W 184)	½ (B 180)	6	89	93½	2514
176	(Austria) Valentin Dragnev	2380	1 (W 45)	1 (B 62)	0 (W 52)	½ (B 96)	0 (W 80)	½ (B 157)	1 (W 65)	0 (B 60)	½ (W 49)	½ (B 85)	0 (W 138)	0 (B 93)	½ (W 170)	0 (B 136)	0 (W 159)	5½	111	117	2606
177	(Norway) Aryan Tari	2562	½ (W 9)	0 (B 4)	1 (W 101)	½ (B 55)	1 (W 172)	½ (B 61)	½ (W 91)	0 (B 10)	½ (W 118)	0 (W 146)	0 (B 144)	½ (B 192)	0 (W 152)	½ (B 169)	0 (W 161)	5½	109½	114½	2574
178	(Russia) Ramil Faizrakhmanov	2500	0 (W 52)	0 (B 69)	1 (W 198)	0 (B 65)	1 (W 196)	1 (B 49)	0 (W 45)	1 (B 116)	1 (W 157)	0 (B 42)	0 (W 47)	½ (B 114)	0 (W 127)	0 (B 142)	0 (W 158)	5½	107½	112	2548
179	(Russia) Vadim Moiseenko	2596	1 (W 199)	(B 91)	0 (W 16)	0 (B 82)	1 (W 115)	1 (B 168)	½ (W 61)	½ (B 79)	0 (W 11)	0 (B 118)	0 (W 113)	0 (B 133)	½ (W 169)	½ (B 161)	0 (W 160)	5½	106½	110½	2543
180	(Spain) Renier Castellanos Rodriguez	2563	½ (W 14)	0 (B 9)	1 (W 161)	0 (B 91)	0 (W 168)	0 (B 115)	0 (W 117)	1 (B 196)	½ (W 182)	0 (B 140)	½ (W 190)	1 (B 191)	½ (W 160)	0 (B 134)	½ (W 175)	5½	98	103	2495
181	(Turkmenistan) Maksat Atabayev	2527	1 (W 63)	0 (B 71)	0 (W 69)	0 (B 90)	1 (W 141)	0 (B 167)	1 (W 162)	0 (B 118)	0 (B 134)	½ (W 120)	0 (B 168)	1 (W 173)	0 (B 164)	0 (W 153)	1 (B 193)	5½	98	103	2459
182	(Russia) Igor Glek	2478	0 (B 42)	1 (W 27)	0 (B 104)	1 (W 119)	0 (B 25)	½ (W 137)	0 (B 128)	0 (W 188)	½ (B 180)	½ (W 187)	0 (B 141)	1 (W 197)	0 (B 162)	0 (B 159)	1 (W 204)	5½	98	101	2448
183	(Sweden) Pontus Carlsson	2501	0 (W 32)	1 (B 204)	½ (W 64)	0 (B 80)	½ (W 49)	0 (B 116)	1 (W 196)	0 (B 123)	0 (B 66)	1 (W 190)	½ (W 157)	0 (B 136)	0 (W 150)	0 (B 187)	1 (W 198)	5½	97½	100½	2401
184	(Russia) Evgeny Pigusov	2500	0 (B 125)	½ (W 25)	½ (B 137)	½ (W 154)	0 (B 130)	0 (W 158)	0 (B 188)	1 (W 142)	½ (B 172)	1 (W 173)	½ (W 116)	½ (B 157)	0 (W 115)	½ (B 175)	0 (W 150)	5½	96½	102	2497
185	(Russia) Sergei Lobanov	2483	0 (W 71)	0 (B 96)	1 (W 201)	1 (B 112)	0 (W 84)	0 (B 100)	0 (W 49)	1 (B 195)	0 (B 114)	1 (W 172)	0 (B 119)	0 (W 158)	0 (B 193)	1 (W 202)	½ (B 191)	5½	93½	96½	2480
186	(Russia) Ruslan Shcherbakov	2520	0 (B 44)	1 (W 198)	0 (B 103)	1 (W 195)	0 (B 146)	0 (W 11)	0 (B 193)	1 (W 202)	1 (B 187)	0 (W 114)	0 (B 66)	½ (W 162)	0 (B 142)	1 (W 197)	0 (B 148)	5½	93½	96½	2384
187	(Mongolia) Tsog-Ochir Tengis	2003	1 (W 106)	0 (B 14)	½ (W 136)	0 (B 155)	0 (W 108)	0 (B 147)	½ (W 161)	1 (B 140)	0 (W 186)	½ (B 182)	0 (W 192)	0 (B 160)	1 (B 204)	1 (W 183)	0 (B 153)	5½	92½	95½	2525
188	(Nepal) Bibek Thing	2026	½ (B 92)	0 (W 89)	0 (B 165)	0 (B 140)	0 (W 117)	1 (B 200)	1 (W 184)	1 (B 182)	0 (W 113)	0 (W 119)	0 (B 120)	0 (B 169)	0 (W 159)	1 (W 201)	1 (B 197)	5½	90½	93½	2434
189	(Russia) Stanislav Novikov	2544	0 (B 24)	(W 142)	½ (B 145)	(W 192)	0 (B 148)	0 (W 101)	0 (W 191)	0 (B 175)	½ (W 197)	1 (B 196)	1 (B 172)	(W 168)	1 (B 153)	0 (W 162)	0 (B 144)	5½	90	94½	2374
190	(Morocco) Mohamed Tissir	2356	½ (W 157)	0 (B 33)	½ (W 194)	0 (B 72)	0 (W 159)	1 (B 197)	1 (W 170)	0 (B 135)	0 (W 87)	0 (B 183)	½ (B 180)	½ (W 171)	0 (W 195)	½ (B 173)	1 (B 203)	5½	88½	92	2484
191	(Russia) Ilya Makoveev	2340	0 (B 104)	0 (W 34)	0 (B 88)	½ (B 198)	1 (W 175)	0 (W 174)	1 (B 189)	0 (B 133)	0 (W 170)	1 (B 197)	½ (W 151)	0 (W 180)	0 (B 171)	1 (B 200)	½ (W 185)	5½	87½	91½	2446
192	(Russia) Konstantin Sek	2439	0 (W 68)	0 (B 106)	1 (W 63)	½ (B 189)	1 (W 138)	0 (B 26)	0 (W 93)	1 (B 159)	0 (B 95)	0 (W 27)	1 (B 187)	½ (W 177)	0 (B 149)	0 (W 171)	0 (B 174)	5	102	107½	2582
193	(Finland) Tommi Luukkonen	2332	0 (W 47)	0 (B 136)	0 (W 110)	1 (B 200)	1 (W 194)	0 (B 131)	1 (W 186)	0 (B 109)	1 (W 156)	0 (B 87)	0 (W 170)	0 (B 152)	1 (W 185)	0 (B 163)	0 (W 181)	5	92½	96½	2532
194	(Mongolia) Bayarsaikhan Gundavaa	2541	0 (B 11)	½ (W 175)	½ (B 190)	0 (W 145)	0 (B 193)	1 (W 199)	0 (B 139)	1 (W 162)	1 (B 120)	0 (W 124)	0 (B 140)	0 (W 174)	0 (W 141)	1 (B 196)	0 (W 173)	5	91	95	2414
195	(Russia) Vladimir Mikhailovsky	2267	1 (W 112)	0 (B 68)	0 (W 56)	0 (B 186)	0 (W 156)	0 (B 141)	1 (B 201)	0 (W 185)	0 (W 161)	1 (B 198)	0 (B 174)	1 (W 204)	1 (B 190)	0 (W 139)	0 (B 172)	5	86½	89½	2419
196	(Hong Kong) Daniel King Wai Lam	2146	0 (W 85)	0 (B 108)	0 (B 166)	1 (W 204)	0 (B 178)	1 (W 120)	0 (B 183)	0 (W 180)	0 (B 162)	0 (W 189)	0 (B 200)	1 (W 203)	1 (B 201)	0 (W 194)	1 (B 202)	5	75½	78½	2379
197	(Russia) Aleksandr Usov	1981	0 (B 129)	0 (B 113)	1 (W 140)	0 (W 86)	0 (B 174)	0 (W 190)	0 (B 199)	1 (W 203)	½ (B 189)	0 (W 191)	1 (B 201)	0 (B 182)	1 (W 200)	0 (B 186)	0 (W 188)	4½	80	83	2372
198	(Saudi Arabia) Hamoud Al Nhier	2025	0 (W 155)	0 (B 186)	0 (B 178)	½ (W 191)	0 (B 142)	0 (B 175)	½ (W 200)	½ (W 204)	½ (B 201)	0 (W 195)	½ (B 203)	1 (W 202)	0 (B 173)	1 (W 199)	0 (B 183)	4½	70	73	2290
199	(Brazil) Diogo Duarte Guimaraes	2286	0 (B 179)	½ (W 99)	0 (B 126)	½ (W 132)	0 (B 171)	0 (B 194)	1 (W 197)	0 (W 165)	0 (B 166)	1 (W 204)	0 (B 161)	1 (W 201)	0 (B 139)	0 (B 198)	0 (W 200)	4	79	82	2370
200	(Saudi Arabia) Abdulrahman Masrahi	1867	0 (W 116)	0 (B 156)	0 (B 152)	0 (W 193)	½ (B 203)	0 (W 188)	½ (B 198)	½ (W 201)	(B 204)	0 (W 202)	1 (W 196)	0 (B 172)	0 (B 197)	0 (W 191)	1 (B 199)	4	70	73	2237
201	(Saudi Arabia) Hassan Al Mutairi	2004	0 (B 128)	0 (W 86)	0 (B 185)	0 (B 160)	½ (W 204)	½ (B 202)	0 (W 195)	½ (B 200)	½ (W 198)	½ (B 203)	0 (W 197)	0 (B 199)	0 (W 196)	0 (B 188)	1 (-)	3½	69	71½	2194
202	(Brazil) Jayme Amorim Miranda Neto	2171	½ (B 89)	0 (W 95)	0 (B 99)	0 (B 161)	0 (W 101)	(W 201)	1 (B 204)	0 (B 186)	0 (W 140)	1 (B 200)	0 (W 162)	0 (B 198)	0 (W 203)	0 (B 185)	0 (W 196)	3	82	85	2329
203	(Saudi Arabia) Ahmed Al Ghamdi	2106	0 (B 15)	0 (B 98)	0 (W 72)	0 (B 63)	½ (W 200)	½ (B 204)	0 (W 140)	0 (B 197)	0 (B 142)	½ (W 201)	½ (W 198)	0 (B 196)	1 (B 202)	0 (W 172)	0 (W 190)	3	81½	84½	2238
204	(Saudi Arabia) Ahmed Al Thebaiti	1841	0 (B 119)	0 (W 183)	0 (B 120)	0 (B 196)	½ (B 201)	½ (W 203)	0 (W 202)	½ (B 198)	½ (W 200)	0 (B 199)	0 (W 160)	0 (B 195)	0 (W 187)	1 (-)	0 (B 182)	3	69½	72	2219
205	(Moldova) Viorel Iordachescu	2666	0 (W 139)	0 (-)	0 (-)	0 (-)	0 (-)	0 (-)	0 (-)	0 (-)	0 (-)	0 (-)	0 (-)	0 (-)	0 (-)	0 (-)	0 (-)	0	66½	67½	0
205	(Russia) Mikhail Mozharov	2468	0 (B 114)	0 (-)	0 (-)	0 (-)	0 (-)	0 (-)	0 (-)	0 (-)	0 (-)	0 (-)	0 (-)	0 (-)	0 (-)	0 (-)	0 (-)	0	66½	67½	0
205	(Kazakhstan) Zhandos Agmanov	2391	0 (W 51)	0 (-)	0 (-)	0 (-)	0 (-)	0 (-)	0 (-)	0 (-)	0 (-)	0 (-)	0 (-)	0 (-)	0 (-)	0 (-)	0 (-)	0	66½	67½	0

== Women's tournament results ==
The following table lists all participants, with the results from the 17 rounds. They are ranked according to the results, taking into account the tie-breaks.

Notation: "1 (W 106)" indicates a win (1 point) with white pieces (W) against player of rank 106 (Margarita Potapova). The first tiebreak (labeled BC1) is the Buchholz Cut 1 score, the second tiebreak (labeled BS) is the Buchholz score, and the third tiebreak (labelled AROC1) is the average rating of opponents cut 1.

Rank	Name	Rating	1	2	3	4	5	6	7	8	9	10	11	12	Total	BC1	BS	AROC1
1	(India) Koneru Humpy (Note: Koneru won the title tie-breaker in an Armageddon match, after drawing 1 – 1 with Lei Tingjie in a 3+2 blitz game.)	2438	1 (W 106)	½ (B 56)	1 (W 24)	1 (B 42)	1 (W 4)	0 (B 9)	½ (B 6)	1 (W 22)	½ (B 3)	½ (W 11)	1 (B 17)	1 (W 5)	9	86	90½	2405
2	(China) Lei Tingjie (Note: Lei lost the title tie-breaker in an Armageddon match, after drawing 1 – 1 with Koneru Humpy in a 3+2 blitz game.)	2498	1 (W 105)	1 (B 30)	0 (W 4)	1 (B 51)	1 (W 15)	1 (B 23)	½ (W 9)	1 (B 18)	1 (W 5)	1 (B 7)	½ (W 6)	0 (B 3)	9	87½	91½	2414
3	(Turkey) Ekaterina Atalik	2360	0 (W 57)	1 (B 72)	1 (W 92)	1 (B 44)	1 (W 21)	1 (B 27)	0 (W 5)	1 (B 14)	½ (W 1)	1 (B 13)	½ (B 9)	1 (W 2)	9	83	88	2374
4	(Russia) Olga Girya	2365	1 (B 102)	1 (W 70)	1 (B 2)	1 (W 22)	0 (B 1)	0 (W 8)	1 (W 16)	1 (B 21)	1 (B 11)	1 (W 9)	0 (W 5)	½ (B 6)	8½	88	92½	2463
5	(China) Tan Zhongyi	2496	1 (B 26)	½ (W 17)	1 (B 41)	1 (W 68)	1 (B 56)	½ (W 18)	1 (B 3)	½ (W 9)	0 (B 2)	1 (W 22)	1 (B 4)	0 (B 1)	8½	86½	92	2382
6	(Ukraine) Anna Muzychuk	2592	1 (W 54)	0 (B 34)	1 (W 60)	1 (B 33)	½ (W 87)	1 (B 31)	½ (W 1)	1 (B 15)	½ (W 13)	1 (B 18)	½ (B 2)	½ (W 4)	8½	83½	88½	2378
7	(Ukraine) Mariya Muzychuk	2518	1 (B 77)	0 (W 12)	1 (B 26)	½ (W 45)	1 (B 41)	1 (W 10)	1 (B 56)	1 (W 8)	0 (B 9)	0 (W 2)	1 (B 39)	1 (W 19)	8½	82	87½	2350
8	(Russia) Natalia Pogonina	2494	½ (W 100)	½ (B 60)	1 (W 110)	1 (B 82)	1 (W 39)	1 (B 4)	½ (W 13)	0 (B 7)	½ (W 12)	½ (B 24)	1 (W 18)	1 (B 9)	8½	78½	82½	2361
9	(Romania) Irina Bulmaga	2383	1 (B 94)	1 (W 61)	1 (B 12)	1 (W 39)	½ (B 18)	1 (W 1)	½ (B 2)	½ (B 5)	1 (W 7)	0 (B 4)	½ (W 3)	0 (W 8)	8	88½	93½	2408
10	(Russia) Alina Kashlinskaya	2293	½ (W 87)	1 (B 65)	1 (W 20)	1 (B 14)	½ (W 13)	0 (B 7)	½ (W 23)	½ (B 27)	1 (W 28)	½ (B 39)	1 (W 21)	½ (B 12)	8	81½	86½	2390
11	(Russia) Kateryna Lagno	2533	½ (W 60)	1 (B 100)	1 (W 32)	0 (B 56)	1 (W 24)	1 (B 35)	1 (W 20)	½ (B 13)	0 (W 4)	½ (B 1)	1 (W 31)	½ (B 14)	8	81½	86	2375
12	(Armenia) Elina Danielian	2356	1 (W 67)	1 (B 7)	0 (W 9)	½ (B 25)	½ (W 42)	½ (B 44)	1 (W 80)	1 (B 46)	½ (B 8)	1 (W 23)	½ (B 19)	½ (W 10)	8	80½	86	2333
13	(India) Harika Dronavalli	2425	1 (B 86)	½ (W 88)	1 (B 62)	1 (W 71)	½ (B 10)	1 (W 47)	½ (B 8)	½ (W 11)	½ (B 6)	0 (W 3)	½ (W 16)	1 (B 35)	8	80	85	2395
14	(Bulgaria) Antoaneta Stefanova	2455	1 (B 50)	½ (W 41)	1 (B 88)	0 (W 10)	½ (B 45)	1 (W 42)	½ (B 49)	0 (W 3)	1 (B 62)	1 (W 30)	1 (B 36)	½ (W 11)	8	77½	82½	2334
15	(Russia) Polina Shuvalova	2370	1 (B 58)	1 (W 64)	0 (B 68)	1 (W 19)	0 (B 2)	1 (W 60)	1 (B 87)	0 (W 6)	0 (B 40)	1 (W 70)	1 (B 48)	1 (B 29)	8	74	79	2289
16	(Russia) Alexandra Kosteniuk	2538	0 (B 19)	1 (W 94)	1 (B 77)	1 (W 40)	0 (B 47)	1 (W 73)	0 (B 4)	½ (W 58)	1 (B 68)	1 (W 41)	½ (B 13)	1 (B 24)	8	73½	78½	2296
17	(Russia) Daria Voit	2344	1 (W 103)	½ (B 5)	0 (W 87)	½ (B 73)	½ (W 67)	1 (B 90)	1 (W 44)	1 (B 57)	½ (W 20)	1 (B 29)	0 (W 1)	1 (B 27)	8	72½	77	2301
18	(Georgia (country)) Meri Arabidze	2416	1 (W 112)	1 (B 63)	1 (W 46)	1 (B 57)	½ (W 9)	½ (B 5)	½ (B 22)	0 (W 2)	1 (B 56)	0 (W 6)	0 (B 8)	1 (W 41)	7½	81	85	2388
19	(Russia) Baira Kovanova	2258	1 (W 16)	½ (B 31)	½ (W 33)	0 (B 15)	½ (W 74)	½ (W 29)	1 (B 109)	1 (B 99)	1 (W 27)	1 (B 20)	½ (W 12)	0 (B 7)	7½	79½	83	2380
20	(Russia) Valentina Gunina	2434	1 (B 89)	½ (W 37)	0 (B 10)	1 (W 62)	1 (B 46)	1 (W 43)	0 (B 11)	1 (W 30)	½ (B 17)	0 (W 19)	1 (B 49)	½ (W 23)	7½	78½	83½	2322
21	(Kazakhstan) Zhansaya Abdumalik	2484	1 (B 117)	½ (W 32)	1 (B 37)	½ (W 47)	0 (B 3)	1 (B 34)	1 (W 78)	0 (W 4)	½ (B 36)	1 (W 40)	0 (B 10)	1 (W 39)	7½	78½	81½	2332
22	(Georgia (country)) Nana Dzagnidze	2478	1 (W 96)	1 (B 55)	1 (W 34)	0 (B 4)	1 (W 57)	1 (B 87)	½ (W 18)	0 (B 1)	1 (W 67)	0 (B 5)	0 (W 24)	1 (B 47)	7½	77½	82½	2329
23	(Georgia (country)) Nino Batsiashvili	2401	1 (W 95)	0 (B 57)	1 (W 67)	1 (B 55)	1 (W 63)	0 (W 2)	½ (B 10)	1 (B 32)	½ (W 39)	0 (B 12)	1 (W 56)	½ (B 20)	7½	76	81	2317
24	(Georgia (country)) Nino Khomeriki	2327	½ (B 69)	1 (W 59)	0 (B 1)	1 (W 97)	0 (B 11)	1 (W 71)	½ (B 43)	1 (W 87)	1 (B 49)	½ (W 8)	1 (B 22)	0 (W 16)	7½	76	80½	2296
25	(Ukraine) Anna Ushenina	2439	1 (B 110)	0 (W 68)	1 (B 108)	½ (W 12)	1 (B 37)	0 (W 56)	0 (B 48)	1 (W 54)	½ (B 69)	1 (W 38)	½ (B 34)	1 (W 45)	7½	69½	73½	2290
26	(Azerbaijan) Ulviyya Fataliyeva	2244	0 (W 5)	1 (B 101)	0 (W 7)	1 (B 113)	1 (W 53)	0 (B 39)	0 (W 33)	1 (B 109)	1 (B 76)	½ (W 28)	1 (B 69)	1 (W 52)	7½	69	72½	2322
27	(United States) Irina Krush	2415	1 (B 90)	1 (W 108)	0 (B 39)	1 (W 36)	1 (B 68)	0 (W 3)	½ (B 30)	½ (W 10)	0 (B 19)	1 (W 42)	1 (B 58)	0 (W 17)	7	76	80	2290
28	(Kazakhstan) Dinara Saduakassova	2446	1 (W 83)	1 (B 38)	½ (W 42)	0 (B 87)	½ (W 30)	1 (B 63)	½ (W 32)	½ (W 49)	0 (B 10)	½ (B 26)	1 (W 50)	½ (W 34)	7	74½	79½	2289
29	(Iran) Sarasadat Khademalsharieh	2421	1 (W 44)	0 (B 42)	1 (W 112)	½ (B 30)	0 (W 43)	½ (B 19)	1 (B 60)	1 (W 61)	1 (B 58)	0 (W 17)	1 (B 40)	0 (W 15)	7	74	78	2240
30	(Kazakhstan) Bibisara Assaubayeva	2311	1 (B 76)	0 (W 2)	1 (B 114)	½ (W 29)	½ (B 28)	1 (W 109)	½ (W 27)	0 (B 20)	1 (W 43)	0 (B 14)	½ (W 78)	1 (B 58)	7	73	76½	2296
31	(Azerbaijan) Gulnar Mammadova	2418	1 (B 75)	½ (W 19)	0 (B 71)	1 (W 48)	1 (B 40)	0 (W 6)	1 (B 68)	0 (W 56)	1 (B 88)	1 (W 69)	0 (B 11)	½ (W 36)	7	72	77	2308
32	(Ukraine) Inna Gaponenko	2328	1 (W 113)	½ (B 21)	0 (B 11)	½ (W 91)	1 (B 69)	1 (W 70)	½ (B 28)	0 (W 23)	1 (B 59)	½ (W 48)	0 (W 35)	1 (B 63)	7	71½	75	2302
33	(Russia) Karina Ambartsumova	2346	½ (B 40)	1 (W 97)	(B 19)	0 (W 6)	1 (B 75)	0 (W 58)	1 (B 26)	½ (W 59)	0 (B 48)	½ (W 90)	1 (B 71)	1 (W 56)	7	70½	75	2242
34	(Poland) Monika Soćko	2359	1 (B 115)	1 (W 6)	0 (B 22)	½ (W 109)	1 (B 59)	0 (W 21)	0 (W 46)	1 (B 100)	1 (W 57)	½ (B 56)	½ (W 25)	½ (B 28)	7	70½	74	2321
35	(Germany) Elisabeth Pähtz	2381	0 (B 108)	1 (W 58)	1 (B 61)	½ (W 46)	1 (B 71)	0 (W 11)	½ (B 59)	0 (W 40)	1 (B 89)	1 (W 77)	1 (B 32)	0 (W 13)	7	69½	73½	2256
36	(Ukraine) Iulija Osmak	2318	0 (W 92)	1 (B 95)	1 (W 119)	0 (B 27)	0 (W 61)	1 (W 103)	1 (B 72)	1 (B 50)	½ (W 21)	1 (B 67)	0 (W 14)	½ (B 31)	7	67	70	2265
37	(Iran) Atousa Pourkashiyan	2299	1 (W 107)	½ (B 20)	0 (W 21)	1 (B 118)	0 (W 25)	½ (B 74)	½ (W 81)	½ (B 79)	0 (W 83)	1 (B 108)	1 (W 61)	1 (B 64)	7	64	67½	2222
38	(Russia) Marina Guseva	2297	1 (B 118)	0 (W 28)	½ (B 111)	0 (W 59)	0 (B 79)	1 (W 116)	1 (B 98)	½ (W 89)	1 (B 108)	0 (B 25)	1 (W 70)	1 (W 66)	7	58½	62	2190
39	(Mongolia) Batkhuyagiin Möngöntuul	2368	1 (W 101)	1 (B 109)	1 (W 27)	0 (B 9)	0 (B 8)	1 (W 26)	½ (B 58)	1 (W 48)	½ (B 23)	½ (W 10)	0 (W 7)	0 (B 21)	6½	79	82½	2348
40	(Russia) Anna Afonasieva	2144	½ (W 33)	1 (B 49)	1 (W 99)	0 (B 16)	0 (W 31)	½ (B 82)	1 (W 55)	1 (B 35)	1 (W 15)	0 (B 21)	0 (W 29)	½ (B 51)	6½	77	82½	2396
41	(Russia) Aleksandra Maltsevskaya	2316	1 (W 80)	½ (B 14)	0 (W 5)	1 (B 76)	0 (W 7)	½ (B 79)	1 (W 110)	½ (B 43)	1 (W 46)	0 (B 16)	1 (W 57)	0 (B 18)	6½	76	80	2315
42	(Russia) Ekaterina Kovalevskaya	2278	1 (B 98)	1 (W 29)	½ (B 28)	0 (W 1)	½ (B 12)	0 (B 14)	0 (W 69)	1 (W 115)	1 (B 61)	0 (B 27)	½ (W 43)	1 (W 75)	6½	73½	77	2282
43	(China) Song Yuxin	1912	1 (B 84)	½ (W 47)	½ (B 45)	½ (W 52)	1 (B 29)	0 (B 20)	½ (W 24)	½ (W 41)	0 (B 30)	½ (W 62)	½ (B 42)	1 (B 83)	6½	73	78½	2344
44	(Mongolia) Davaadembereliin Nomin-Erdene	2190	0 (B 29)	1 (W 120)	1 (B 53)	0 (W 3)	1 (B 52)	½ (W 12)	0 (B 17)	0 (W 88)	0 (B 45)	1 (W 76)	1 (B 84)	1 (B 78)	6½	73	75½	2334
45	(Belarus) Olga Badelka	2339	½ (W 116)	1 (B 81)	½ (W 43)	½ (B 7)	½ (W 14)	0 (B 57)	0 (W 50)	½ (B 72)	1 (W 44)	1 (B 54)	1 (W 67)	0 (B 25)	6½	72½	76	2265
46	(Russia) Evgenija Ovod	2262	1 (B 85)	1 (W 53)	0 (B 18)	½ (B 35)	0 (W 20)	1 (W 111)	1 (B 34)	0 (W 12)	0 (B 41)	0 (W 52)	1 (B 97)	1 (B 67)	6½	72	76	2308
47	(Russia) Alisa Galliamova	2378	1 (W 93)	½ (B 43)	1 (W 73)	½ (B 21)	1 (W 16)	0 (B 13)	½ (W 57)	0 (B 67)	½ (W 63)	½ (B 83)	1 (W 74)	0 (W 22)	6½	71½	76½	2286
48	(Azerbaijan) Gunay Mammadzada	2277	½ (W 74)	0 (B 87)	1 (W 116)	0 (B 31)	1 (W 76)	1 (B 91)	1 (W 25)	0 (B 39)	1 (W 33)	½ (B 32)	0 (W 15)	½ (W 49)	6½	70½	74	2273
49	(Italy) Olga Zimina	2343	½ (B 97)	0 (W 40)	½ (B 69)	1 (W 102)	1 (B 108)	1 (W 61)	½ (W 14)	½ (B 28)	0 (W 24)	1 (B 63)	0 (W 20)	½ (B 48)	6½	69	73	2270
50	(Ukraine) Evgeniya Doluhanova	2227	0 (W 14)	½ (B 103)	½ (W 80)	½ (B 92)	1 (W 118)	½ (B 99)	1 (B 45)	0 (W 36)	½ (B 98)	1 (W 68)	0 (B 28)	1 (W 74)	6½	65	68½	2240
51	(Armenia) Lilit Mkrtchian	2338	0 (B 64)	1 (W 102)	1 (B 70)	0 (W 2)	0 (B 58)	1 (W 108)	½ (B 89)	½ (W 81)	½ (B 75)	½ (W 59)	1 (B 90)	½ (W 40)	6½	64½	68½	2197
52	(Sweden) Pia Cramling	2428	½ (W 81)	1 (B 116)	0 (W 56)	½ (B 43)	0 (W 44)	1 (B 75)	0 (W 67)	½ (B 110)	1 (W 72)	1 (B 46)	1 (W 83)	0 (B 26)	6½	64½	68	2209
53	(Russia) Anastasia Bodnaruk	2410	1 (W 72)	0 (B 46)	0 (W 44)	1 (W 111)	0 (B 26)	0 (B 81)	0 (W 64)	1 (B 116)	½ (W 65)	1 (B 93)	1 (W 59)	1 (B 79)	6½	64	67½	2153
54	(Russia) Elizaveta Solozhenkina	2262	0 (B 6)	½ (W 76)	0 (B 97)	0 (W 85)	1 (B 117)	1 (W 114)	1 (B 71)	0 (B 25)	1 (W 93)	0 (W 45)	1 (B 98)	1 (W 69)	6½	62½	65½	2214
55	(Poland) Klaudia Kulon	2308	1 (B 114)	0 (W 22)	1 (B 121)	0 (W 23)	0 (B 70)	1 (W 97)	0 (B 40)	0 (W 108)	1 (B 102)	1 (W 91)	½ (B 75)	1 (W 72)	6½	60	61½	2198
56	(Russia) Daria Charochkina	2296	1 (B 111)	½ (W 1)	1 (B 52)	1 (W 11)	0 (W 5)	1 (B 25)	0 (W 7)	1 (B 31)	0 (W 18)	½ (W 34)	0 (B 23)	0 (B 33)	6	84	88	2436
57	(Russia) Ekaterina Goltseva	2154	1 (B 3)	1 (W 23)	1 (B 66)	0 (W 18)	0 (B 22)	1 (W 45)	½ (B 47)	0 (W 17)	0 (B 34)	1 (W 88)	0 (B 41)	½ (W 62)	6	78	83	2370
58	(Georgia (country)) Sopio Gvetadze	2161	0 (W 15)	0 (B 35)	1 (W 105)	1 (B 121)	1 (W 51)	1 (B 33)	½ (W 39)	½ (B 16)	0 (W 29)	1 (B 78)	0 (W 27)	0 (W 30)	6	73½	75	2372
59	(Kazakhstan) Assel Serikbay	1989	½ (W 73)	0 (B 24)	1 (W 96)	1 (B 38)	0 (W 34)	1 (B 66)	½ (W 35)	½ (B 33)	0 (W 32)	½ (B 51)	0 (B 53)	1 (W 90)	6	72	77	2335
60	(Russia) Irina Mikhaylova	2258	½ (B 11)	½ (W 8)	0 (B 6)	1 (W 64)	1 (B 85)	0 (B 15)	0 (W 29)	0 (W 76)	1 (B 115)	½ (W 97)	½ (B 68)	1 (W 94)	6	72	75½	2312
61	(Kazakhstan) Gulmira Dauletova	2146	1 (B 122)	0 (B 9)	0 (W 35)	1 (W 77)	1 (B 36)	0 (B 49)	1 (W 82)	0 (B 29)	0 (W 42)	1 (W 94)	0 (B 37)	1 (W 88)	6	70½	75½	2315
62	(Russia) Alina Bivol	2283	½ (W 65)	1 (B 74)	0 (W 13)	0 (B 20)	1 (W 92)	0 (B 67)	1 (W 91)	1 (B 80)	0 (W 14)	½ (B 43)	½ (W 79)	½ (B 57)	6	69	74	2193
63	(Ukraine) Nataliya Buksa	2275	1 (B 120)	0 (W 18)	1 (B 98)	1 (W 66)	0 (B 23)	0 (W 28)	½ (B 70)	1 (W 90)	½ (B 47)	0 (W 49)	1 (B 87)	0 (W 32)	6	68	70½	2269
64	(Russia) Anastasiya Protopopova	2135	1 (W 51)	0 (B 15)	0 (W 82)	0 (B 60)	1 (W 106)	0 (W 88)	1 (B 53)	0 (B 83)	1 (W 95)	1 (B 81)	1 (W 73)	0 (W 37)	6	66	70½	2294
65	(Mongolia) Turmunkh Munkhzul	1977	½ (B 62)	0 (W 10)	0 (B 75)	1 (W 105)	0 (B 90)	1 (B 95)	0 (W 100)	½ (W 94)	½ (B 53)	1 (W 117)	½ (B 88)	1 (W 89)	6	59½	62½	2251
66	(Armenia) Anna M. Sargsyan	2382	1 (W 79)	1 (B 92)	0 (W 57)	0 (B 63)	0 (W 72)	0 (W 59)	0 (B 115)	1 (B 113)	1 (W 111)	1 (W 98)	1 (B 77)	0 (B 38)	6	58½	62	2156
67	(Russia) Anna Novikova	2147	0 (B 12)	1 (W 117)	0 (B 23)	1 (W 84)	½ (B 17)	1 (W 62)	1 (B 52)	1 (W 47)	0 (B 22)	0 (W 36)	0 (B 45)	0 (W 46)	5½	75½	78½	2350
68	(Russia) Dinara Dordzhieva	2310	1 (W 119)	1 (B 25)	1 (W 15)	0 (B 5)	0 (W 27)	½ (B 80)	0 (W 31)	1 (B 74)	0 (W 16)	0 (B 50)	½ (W 60)	½ (B 71)	5½	75	78	2321
69	(Russia) Ekaterina Borisova	2127	½ (W 24)	0 (B 73)	½ (W 49)	1 (B 110)	0 (W 32)	1 (W 84)	1 (B 42)	1 (B 78)	½ (W 25)	0 (B 31)	0 (W 26)	0 (B 54)	5½	72½	76½	2322
70	(Russia) Galina Strutinskaia	2121	1 (W 82)	0 (B 4)	0 (W 51)	1 (B 112)	1 (W 55)	0 (B 32)	½ (W 63)	1 (B 73)	½ (W 99)	0 (B 15)	0 (B 38)	½ (W 77)	5½	72	76	2322
71	(Romania) Silvia-Raluca Sgircea	2178	½ (W 99)	1 (B 78)	1 (W 31)	0 (B 13)	0 (W 35)	0 (B 24)	0 (W 54)	½ (B 111)	1 (W 104)	1 (B 101)	0 (W 33)	½ (W 68)	5½	69	73	2307
72	(Russia) Vera Nebolsina	2178	0 (B 53)	0 (W 3)	1 (B 120)	1 (W 114)	1 (B 66)	0 (B 78)	0 (W 36)	½ (W 45)	0 (B 52)	1 (B 100)	1 (W 80)	0 (B 55)	5½	67½	70	2301
73	(Serbia) Maria Manakova	2293	½ (B 59)	1 (W 69)	0 (B 47)	(W 17)	1 (B 98)	0 (B 16)	½ (W 74)	0 (W 70)	1 (B 87)	½ (W 75)	0 (B 64)	½ (W 85)	5½	67	71½	2159
74	(Russia) Mariya Yakimova	1964	½ (B 48)	0 (W 62)	1 (B 90)	½ (W 88)	½ (B 19)	½ (W 37)	½ (B 73)	0 (W 68)	1 (B 110)	1 (W 84)	0 (B 47)	0 (B 50)	5½	66½	70½	2283
75	(Russia) Anastasia Bykova	2187	0 (W 31)	½ (B 107)	1 (W 65)	½ (B 78)	0 (W 33)	0 (W 52)	1 (B 119)	1 (B 82)	½ (W 51)	½ (B 73)	½ (W 55)	0 (B 42)	5½	66½	69½	2287
76	(Serbia) Teodora Injac	2110	0 (W 30)	½ (B 54)	1 (W 100)	0 (W 41)	0 (B 48)	½ (B 96)	1 (W 106)	1 (B 60)	0 (W 26)	0 (B 44)	1 (W 112)	½ (B 86)	5½	65½	59½	2249
77	(Iran) Mitra Hejazipour	2253	0 (W 7)	1 (B 93)	0 (W 16)	0 (B 61)	1 (W 119)	1 (B 121)	0 (W 99)	1 (B 104)	1 (W 79)	0 (B 35)	0 (W 66)	½ (B 70)	5½	65	66½	2264
78	(France) Pauline Guichard	2349	½ (B 91)	0 (W 71)	1 (B 103)	½ (W 75)	1 (B 89)	1 (W 72)	0 (B 21)	0 (W 69)	1 (B 81)	0 (W 58)	½ (B 30)	0 (W 44)	5½	64½	69	2218
79	(Russia) Elena Tomilova	2172	0 (B 66)	0 (W 84)	½ (B 117)	1 (B 100)	1 (W 38)	½ (W 41)	½ (B 88)	½ (W 37)	0 (B 77)	1 (W 89)	½ (B 62)	0 (W 53)	5½	64½	67½	2298
80	(Russia) Tatyana Getman	2119	0 (B 41)	½ (W 89)	½ (B 50)	1 (W 94)	1 (B 88)	½ (W 68)	0 (B 12)	0 (W 62)	0 (B 84)	1 (W 110)	0 (B 72)	1 (W 102)	5½	63	67	2259
81	(Russia) Leya Garifullina	2207	½ (B 52)	0 (W 45)	0 (B 118)	½ (W 104)	1 (B 115)	1 (W 53)	½ (B 37)	½ (B 51)	0 (W 78)	0 (W 64)	½ (B 91)	1 (W 98)	5½	62½	66	2234
82	(Ukraine) Natalia Zhukova	2316	0 (B 70)	1 (W 115)	1 (B 64)	0 (W 8)	½ (B 91)	½ (W 40)	0 (B 61)	0 (W 75)	0 (B 101)	1 (W 92)	½ (B 102)	1 (W 87)	5½	61	64½	2178
83	(Russia) Anastasiya Geller	2223	0 (B 28)	0 (W 111)	0 (B 102)	1 (W 120)	1 (B 101)	0 (W 98)	1 (B 97)	1 (W 64)	1 (B 37)	½ (W 47)	0 (B 52)	0 (W 43)	5½	61	63½	2187
84	(Azerbaijan) Zeinab Mamedjarova	2265	0 (W 43)	1 (B 79)	0 (W 109)	0 (B 67)	1 (W 113)	0 (B 69)	1 (W 92)	½ (B 93)	1 (W 80)	0 (B 74)	0 (W 44)	1 (B 104)	5½	59	62½	2069
85	(Turkmenistan) Jemal Ovezdurdiyeva	1836	0 (W 46)	0 (B 112)	1 (W 95)	1 (B 54)	0 (W 60)	0 (B 110)	0 (W 93)	1 (B 105)	0 (W 86)	1 (B 96)	1 (W 100)	½ (B 73)	5½	57	61	2234
86	(Sweden) Inna Agrest	2195	0 (W 13)	0 (B 119)	0 (W 93)	0 (B 95)	½ (B 105)	1 (-)	1 (W 114)	½ (W 91)	1 (B 85)	0 (W 87)	1 (B 103)	½ (W 76)	5½	55	58	2125
87	(Kazakhstan) Nazerke Nurgali	1993	½ (B 10)	1 (W 48)	1 (B 17)	1 (W 28)	½ (B 6)	0 (W 22)	0 (W 15)	0 (B 24)	0 (W 73)	1 (B 86)	0 (W 63)	0 (B 82)	5	78	83	2365
88	(Azerbaijan) Turkan Mamedjarova	2297	1 (W 121)	½ (B 13)	0 (W 14)	½ (B 74)	0 (W 80)	1 (B 64)	½ (W 79)	1 (B 44)	0 (W 31)	0 (B 57)	½ (W 65)	0 (B 61)	5	69½	71	2200
89	(Russia) Margarita Lysenko	2215	0 (W 20)	½ (B 80)	1 (W 107)	½ (B 99)	0 (W 78)	1 (B 104)	½ (W 51)	½ (B 38)	0 (W 35)	0 (B 79)	1 (W 101)	0 (B 65)	5	65½	69½	2241
90	(Russia) Zarina Shafigullina	2179	0 (W 27)	½ (B 104)	0 (W 74)	1 (B 107)	1 (W 65)	0 (W 17)	1 (B 111)	0 (B 63)	1 (W 100)	½ (B 33)	0 (W 51)	0 (B 59)	5	65½	69½	2174
91	(Russia) Daria Khokhlova	2147	½ (W 78)	0 (B 99)	1 (W 104)	½ (B 32)	½ (W 82)	0 (W 48)	0 (B 62)	½ (B 86)	1 (W 96)	0 (B 55)	½ (W 81)	½ (B 93)	5	63½	68½	2278
92	(Ukraine) Irina Barchuk	2124	1 (B 36)	0 (W 66)	0 (B 3)	½ (W 50)	0 (B 62)	½ (W 94)	0 (B 84)	0 (W 101)	1 (W 106)	0 (B 82)	1 (W 109)	1 (B 112)	5	63	66½	2262
93	(Denmark) Esmat Susanne Guindy	2164	0 (B 47)	0 (W 77)	1 (B 86)	0 (W 98)	0 (B 104)	1 (W 113)	1 (B 85)	½ (W 84)	0 (B 54)	0 (W 53)	1 (B 105)	½ (W 91)	5	59½	63	2190
94	(Armenia) Maria Gevorgyan	2175	0 (W 9)	0 (B 16)	1 (W 101)	0 (B 80)	0 (W 121)	½ (B 92)	1 (W 105)	½ (B 65)	1 (W 109)	0 (B 61)	1 (W 108)	0 (B 60)	5	59½	61	2194
95	(Russia) Anna Gvanceladze	2177	0 (B 23)	0 (W 36)	0 (B 85)	1 (W 86)	½ (B 114)	0 (W 65)	½ (B 116)	½ (W 103)	0 (B 64)	½ (W 119)	1 (B 111)	1 (W 97)	5	57½	60½	2143
96	(Russia) Anastasya Paramzina	2228	0 (B 22)	½ (W 118)	0 (B 59)	½ (W 115)	½ (B 97)	½ (W 76)	1 (B 103)	0 (W 98)	0 (B 91)	0 (W 85)	1 (B 119)	1 (W 108)	5	54	57	2125
97	(Germany) Annmarie Muetsch	2141	½ (W 49)	0 (B 33)	1 (W 54)	0 (B 24)	½ (W 96)	0 (B 55)	0 (W 83)	1 (B 106)	1 (W 112)	½ (B 60)	0 (W 46)	0 (B 95)	4½	66½	70½	2269
98	(Finland) Anastasia Nazarova	1969	0 (W 42)	1 (B 106)	0 (W 63)	1 (B 93)	0 (W 73)	1 (B 83)	0 (W 38)	1 (B 96)	½ (W 50)	0 (B 66)	0 (W 54)	0 (B 81)	4½	65	69½	2263
99	(United States) Anna Zatonskih	2403	½ (B 71)	1 (W 91)	0 (B 40)	½ (W 89)	½ (B 109)	½ (W 50)	1 (B 77)	0 (W 19)	½ (B 70)	0 (-)	0 (-)	0 (-)	4½	65	68½	2133
100	(Russia) Olga Karavaeva	2241	½ (B 8)	0 (W 11)	0 (B 76)	0 (W 79)	1 (B 107)	1 (W 118)	1 (B 65)	0 (W 34)	0 (B 90)	0 (W 72)	0 (B 85)	1 (W 115)	4½	64	67½	2199
101	(Russia) Ekaterina Diakonova	2159	0 (B 39)	0 (W 26)	0 (B 94)	1 (-)	0 (W 83)	1 (B 120)	0 (W 104)	1 (B 92)	1 (W 82)	0 (W 71)	0 (B 89)	½ (W 103)	4½	59	61½	2148
102	(Russia) Olga Zhuravleva	2156	0 (W 4)	0 (B 51)	1 (W 83)	0 (B 49)	0 (W 110)	0 (B 106)	1 (W 120)	1 (B 121)	0 (W 55)	1 (B 113)	½ (W 82)	0 (B 80)	4½	59	60½	2236
103	(Russia) Maria Fominykh	2141	0 (B 17)	½ (W 50)	0 (W 78)	½ (B 106)	1 (W 112)	0 (B 36)	0 (W 96)	½ (B 95)	½ (W 117)	1 (B 109)	0 (W 86)	½ (B 101)	4½	58	61	2239
104	(Mongolia) Nanjid Tsogzolmaa	1708	0 (-)	½ (W 90)	0 (B 91)	½ (B 81)	1 (W 93)	0 (W 89)	1 (B 101)	0 (W 77)	0 (B 71)	½ (W 115)	1 (B 110)	0 (W 84)	4½	56½	60	2194
105	(Germany) Josefine Heinemann	2251	0 (B 2)	0 (W 114)	0 (B 58)	0 (B 65)	½ (W 86)	1 (W 107)	0 (B 94)	0 (W 85)	1 (-)	1 (B 116)	0 (W 93)	1 (B 113)	4½	56½	59½	2123
106	(Russia) Margarita Potapova	2222	0 (B 1)	0 (W 98)	½ (B 115)	½ (W 103)	0 (B 64)	1 (W 102)	0 (B 76)	0 (W 97)	0 (B 92)	1 (W 120)	½ (B 107)	1 (W 117)	4½	54	56½	2146
107	(Russia) Alisa Nur-Mukhametova	2019	0 (B 37)	½ (W 75)	0 (B 89)	0 (W 90)	0 (W 100)	0 (B 105)	0 (B 113)	1 (-)	½ (W 114)	1 (B 121)	½ (W 106)	1 (B 116)	4½	49	50½	2176
108	(Russia) Anna Styazhkina	2168	1 (W 35)	0 (B 27)	0 (W 25)	1 (B 119)	0 (W 49)	0 (B 51)	1 (W 121)	1 (B 55)	0 (W 38)	0 (W 37)	0 (B 94)	0 (B 96)	4	68	69½	2299
109	(Mongolia) Davaakhuu Munkhzul	1654	1 (-)	0 (W 39)	1 (B 84)	½ (B 34)	½ (W 99)	0 (B 30)	0 (W 19)	0 (W 26)	0 (B 94)	0 (W 103)	0 (B 92)	1 (W 119)	4	67	70	2247
110	(Russia) Alina Balaian	2222	0 (W 25)	1 (B 113)	0 (B 8)	0 (W 69)	1 (B 102)	1 (W 85)	0 (B 41)	½ (W 52)	0 (W 74)	0 (B 80)	0 (W 104)	½ (B 114)	4	64½	68	2188
111	(Bulgaria) Gabriela Antova	2001	0 (W 56)	1 (B 83)	½ (W 38)	0 (B 53)	1 (W 116)	0 (B 46)	0 (W 90)	½ (W 71)	0 (B 66)	0 (B 112)	0 (W 95)	1 (B 121)	4	60½	62	2248
112	(Mongolia) Altan-Ulzii Enkhtuul	2180	0 (B 18)	1 (W 85)	0 (B 29)	0 (W 70)	0 (B 103)	0 (W 115)	1 (B 118)	1 (W 119)	0 (B 97)	1 (W 111)	0 (B 76)	0 (W 92)	4	56	59	2155
113	(Russia) Maria Komiagina	2129	0 (B 32)	0 (W 110)	1 (-)	0 (W 26)	0 (B 84)	0 (B 93)	1 (W 107)	0 (W 66)	1 (B 120)	0 (W 102)	1 (B 115)	0 (W 105)	4	55½	58	2193
114	(Russia) Kamaliya Bulatova	2060	0 (W 55)	1 (B 105)	0 (W 30)	0 (B 72)	½ (W 95)	0 (B 54)	0 (B 86)	0 (W 120)	½ (B 107)	1 (W 118)	½ (B 117)	½ (W 110)	4	54	56½	2197
115	(Russia) Dina Belenkaya	2147	0 (W 34)	0 (B 82)	½ (W 106)	½ (B 96)	0 (W 81)	1 (B 112)	1 (W 66)	0 (B 42)	0 (W 60)	½ (B 104)	0 (W 113)	0 (B 100)	3½	59½	63	2255
116	(Russia) Elena Semenova	2140	½ (B 45)	0 (W 52)	0 (B 48)	1 (W 117)	0 (B 111)	0 (B 38)	½ (W 95)	0 (W 53)	½ (B 119)	0 (W 105)	1 (B 118)	0 (W 107)	3½	56½	59½	2228
117	(Estonia) Valeriya Gansvind	2230	0 (W 21)	0 (B 67)	½ (W 79)	0 (B 116)	0 (W 54)	0 (B 119)	1 (-)	1 (W 118)	½ (B 103)	0 (B 65)	½ (W 114)	0 (B 106)	3½	54	57	2154
118	(Denmark) Ellen Fredericia Nilssen	2016	0 (W 38)	½ (B 96)	1 (W 81)	0 (W 37)	0 (B 50)	0 (B 100)	0 (W 112)	0 (B 117)	1 (W 121)	0 (B 114)	0 (W 116)	1 (B 120)	3½	52½	54	2193
119	(Russia) Mariya Nosacheva	2069	0 (B 68)	1 (W 86)	0 (B 36)	0 (W 108)	0 (B 77)	1 (W 117)	0 (W 75)	0 (B 112)	½ (W 116)	½ (B 95)	0 (W 96)	0 (B 109)	3	53½	56½	2217
120	(Iran) Nadezhda Antonova	1940	0 (W 63)	0 (B 44)	0 (W 72)	0 (B 83)	1 (-)	0 (W 101)	0 (B 102)	1 (B 114)	0 (W 113)	0 (B 106)	1 (W 121)	0 (W 118)	3	51	52½	2147
121	(Russia) Tatiana Bogumil	2009	0 (B 88)	1 (-)	0 (W 55)	0 (W 58)	1 (B 94)	0 (W 77)	0 (B 108)	0 (W 102)	0 (B 118)	0 (W 107)	0 (B 120)	0 (W 111)	2	53	55½	2136
122	(Russia) Inna Ivakhinova	2349	0 (W 61)	0 (-)	0 (-)	0 (-)	0 (-)	0 (-)	0 (-)	0 (-)	0 (-)	0 (-)	0 (-)	0 (-)	0	44	45	0
