= Deivy =

Deivy is a given name. Notable people with the given name include:

- Deivy Balanta (born 1993), Colombian footballer
- Deivy Grullón (born 1996), Dominican baseball catcher
- Deivy Vera Sigueñas (born 1992), Peruvian chess grandmaster
