= José Martínez Alcántara =

Peruvian chess grandmaster (born 1999)

Personal information
- Born: José Eduardo Martínez Alcántara; 31 January 1999 (age 27) Lima, Peru

Chess career
- Country: Peru (until 2024); Mexico (since 2024)
- Title: Grandmaster (2018)
- FIDE rating: 2650 (July 2026)
- Peak rating: 2667 (December 2025)
- Ranking: No. 69 (July 2026)
- Peak ranking: No. 48 (January 2026)

José Eduardo Martínez Alcántara (born 31 January 1999) is a Peruvian chess grandmaster who has represented Mexico since 2024.

== Chess career ==
Martínez won the U-18 World Championship in 2017 before going on to represent Peru in the 2018 Chess Olympiad.

He won the Zonal Tournament of South America in Ecuador with 7.5 points out of 9, thus qualifying for the Chess World Cup 2019, where he was defeated by Dmitry Jakovenko in the first round.

In the 6th Arica Open in 2019 he tied 2nd-8th place with Nikita Petrov, Deivy Vera Siguenas, Renato R. Quintiliano Pinto, Cristobal Henriquez Villagra, Salvador Alonso, and Diego Saul Rod Flores Quillas.

In 2021, Martinez tied for first place at the U.S. Masters Chess Championship.

In June and August 2024, he played two blitz matches against Vladimir Kramnik after Kramnik accused him of cheating in online chess. The matches were a mix of over-the-board and online chess (held in-person). Martínez won the June 2024 Madrid match 14.5-11.5, while Kramnik won the August 2024 London match 19–17.

At the Chess World Cup 2025, he defeated Isaak Huh in the first round and Velimir Ivić in the second round, before knocking out super-grandmaster Nodirbek Abdusattorov in the third round 2–0. He then defeated Alexey Sarana in the fourth round and Pentala Harikrishna in the fifth round, but was knocked out by eventual winner Javokhir Sindarov in the quarterfinals.
