= Cristóbal Henríquez Villagra =

Chilean chess grandmaster (born 1996)

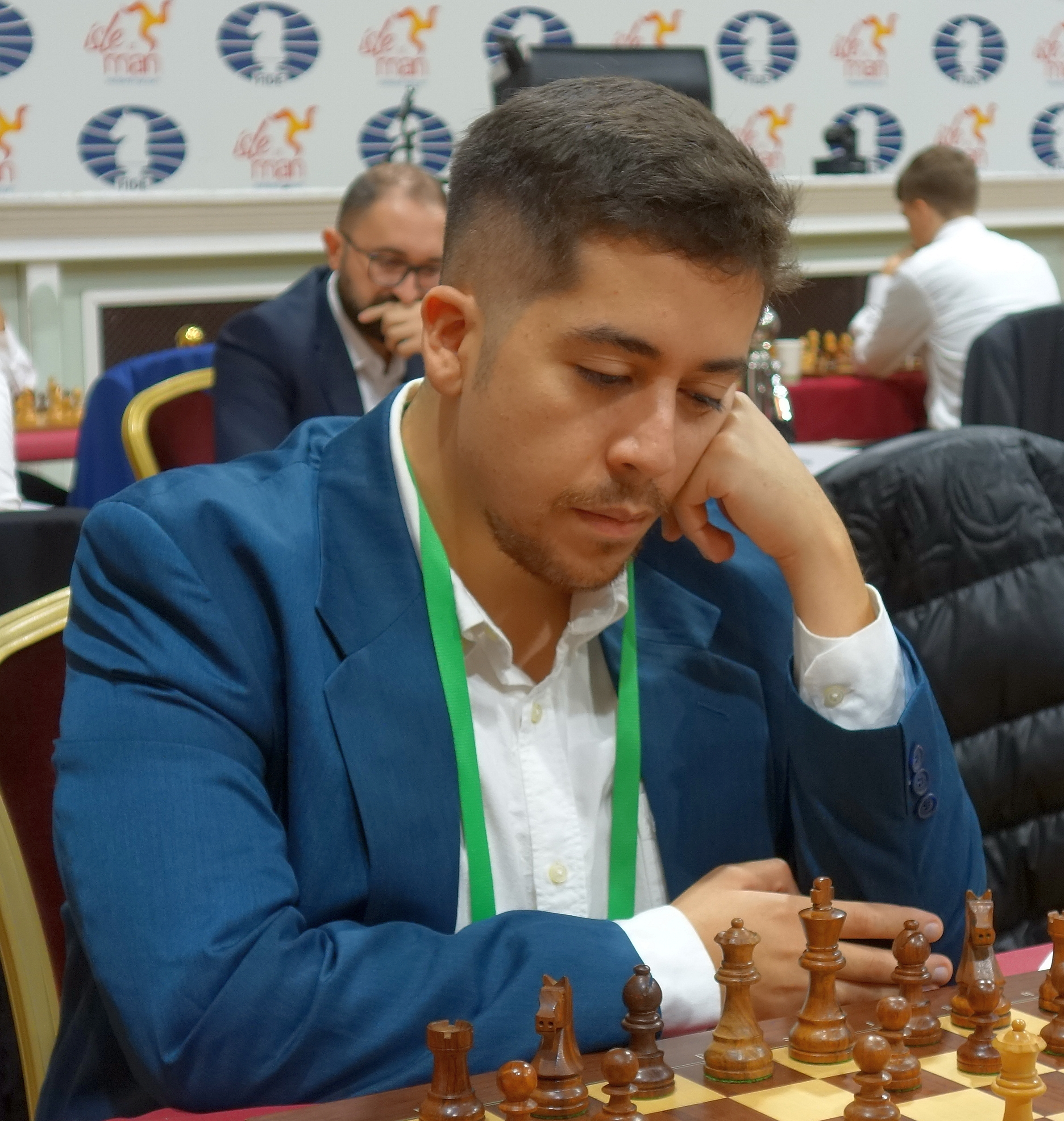
- Cristóbal Henríquez at FIDE Grand Swiss Tournament 2023

Personal information
- Born: Cristóbal Guillermo Henríquez Villagra; 7 August 1996 (age 30) La Florida, Chile

Chess career
- Country: Chile
- Title: Grandmaster (2017)
- FIDE rating: 2569 (October 2026)
- Peak rating: 2630 (September 2023)

Cristóbal Guillermo Henríquez Villagra (born 7 August 1996) is a Chilean chess player. He was awarded the Grandmaster title by FIDE in 2017, at the age of 20.

== Career ==
He was awarded the title of International Master following his win in the 2013 Pan-American Youth chess championship in Brazil.

He was runner-up in the 2014 Chilean championship, and won it in 2015. Henríquez Villagra won the 2014 Pan American junior championship. He played third board for Chile at the 2014 Chess Olympiad in Tromsø, Norway, scoring 6.5/9. In the 2014 World Under-18 championship he finished in a tie for third.

In 2015 he finished in a tie for second at the FIDE zonal in Asunción, then won the playoff against three Grandmasters to qualify for the FIDE World Cup in September of that year. At this event, he caused a major upset in the first round by defeating leading grandmaster Boris Gelfand in the rapid play-off.

He was awarded the Grandmaster title in March 2017.

In the 6th Arica Open in 2019 he tied 2nd-8th place with Jose Eduardo Martinez Alcantara, Deivy Vera Siguenas, Renato R. Quintiliano Pinto, Nikita Petrov, Salvador Alonso, and Diego Saul Rod Flores Quillas.

In November 2025, at the Chess World Cup 2025 he advanced to the second round after eliminating International Master Uurtsaikh Agibileg, but was defeated by Alexey Sarana in the second round.
