= Diego Saul Rod Flores Quillas =

Peruvian chess player (born 2006)

Personal information
- Born: January 14, 2006 (age 20) Lima, Peru

Chess career
- Country: Peru
- Title: International Master (2022)
- FIDE rating: 2420 (July 2026)
- Peak rating: 2460 (July 2024)

Diego Saul Rodrigo Flores Quillas is a Peruvian chess player.

== Chess career ==
In August 2013, he finished second behind Kevin Chor in the under-8 section of the Panamerican Chess Festival.

In July 2017, he finished third in the under-12 section of the Panamerican Chess Festival, during which he won his game against eventual winner Nico Chasin.

In the 6th Arica Open in 2019 he tied 2nd-8th place with Jose Eduardo Martinez Alcantara, Deivy Vera Sigueñas, Salvador Alonso, Cristobal Henriquez Villagra, Nikita Petrov, and Renato R. Quintiliano Pinto.

He played for Peru in the 45th Chess Olympiad.
