= Salvador Alonso =

Argentine chess grandmaster (born 1974)

Personal information
- Born: September 13, 1974 (age 51) Buenos Aires, Argentina

Chess career
- Country: Argentina
- Title: Grandmaster (2009)
- FIDE rating: 2442 (July 2026)
- Peak rating: 2525 (January 2013)

Salvador Alonso (born September 13, 1974 in Buenos Aires) is an Argentine chess Grandmaster (2009).

In 2012 he won the ITT Programa de alto Rendimiento tournament in Uruguay.

In January 2016 Alonso won, 1.5 pts above number two, the ITT CXG Marcel Duchamp Memorial tournament.

In the 6th Arica Open in 2019 he tied 2nd-8th place with Jose Eduardo Martinez Alcantara, Deivy Vera Siguenas, Renato R. Quintiliano Pinto, Cristobal Henriquez Villagra, Nikita Petrov, and Diego Saul Rod Flores Quillas.
