= Renato R. Quintiliano Pinto =

Brazilian chess grandmaster (born 1992)

Personal information
- Born: October 4, 1992 (age 33) Osasco, Brazil

Chess career
- Country: Brazil
- Title: Grandmaster (2022)
- FIDE rating: 2496 (July 2026)
- Peak rating: 2518 (December 2022)

Renato Rodrigues Quintiliano Pinto is a Brazilian chess grandmaster.

== Career ==
In the 6th Arica Open in 2019 he tied 2nd-8th place with Jose Eduardo Martinez Alcantara, Deivy Vera Sigueñas, Salvador Alonso, Cristobal Henriquez Villagra, Nikita Petrov, and Diego Saul Rod Flores Quillas.

In December 2023, he finished in 7th place in the Brazilian Chess Championship, during which he held draws against the eventual champion Luis Paulo Supi and runner-up Alexandr Fier.

In October 2024, he won the Brazilian Rapid Chess Championship. He finished with the same score as Lucas Do Valle Cardoso, Yago De Moura Santiago, and Charles Gauche, but had the best tiebreak score.
