= Nikita Petrov (chess player) =

Russian chess grandmaster (born 1996)

- Petrov in 2024

Personal information
- Born: Nikita Viktorovich Petrov; 1 July 1996 (age 30) Novorossiysk, Russia

Chess career
- Country: Russia (until 2023); Montenegro (since 2023)
- Title: Grandmaster (2018)
- FIDE rating: 2565 (September 2026)
- Peak rating: 2610 (April 2019)

Nikita Viktorovich Petrov (Russian: Никита Викторович Петров; born 1 July 1996) is a Russian chess grandmaster who has represented Montenegro since 2023.

== Career ==
Nikita Viktorovich Petrov was born in Novorossiysk on 1 July 1996. In 2016, he won the 38th International Chess Festival Città di Arco Open A with 8 out of 9, and again in 2017 and 2019 with the same score.

In 2019, he scored 7.5 out of 11, finishing in 17th place, at the European Individual Chess Championship, which qualified him for the Chess World Cup 2019, where he was defeated by Evgeny Tomashevsky in the first round. In the 6th Arica Open in 2019 he tied 2nd-8th place with Jose Eduardo Martinez Alcantara, Deivy Vera Siguenas, Renato R. Quintiliano Pinto, Cristobal Henriquez Villagra, Salvador Alonso, and Diego Saul Rod Flores Quillas.

In the 2021 Tuapse Open, he tied 2nd-4th place with Boris Grachev and Dmitry Kryakvin. In 2021 Petrov won the 17th Ugra Governor`s Cup in Khanty-Mansiysk ahead of Dmitry Kokarev and Daniil Lintchevski.

In 2022, together with 43 other Russian chess players, Petrov signed an open letter to Russian president Vladimir Putin, protesting against the 2022 Russian invasion of Ukraine and expressing solidarity with the Ukrainian people.

In 2024, Petrov won the national championship of Montenegro in Podgorica, scoring 9 out of 11 and edging Nikola Djukić on tiebreaks.
