= Deivy Vera Sigueñas =

Peruvian chess grandmaster (born 1992)

Deivy Anthony Vera Sigueñas
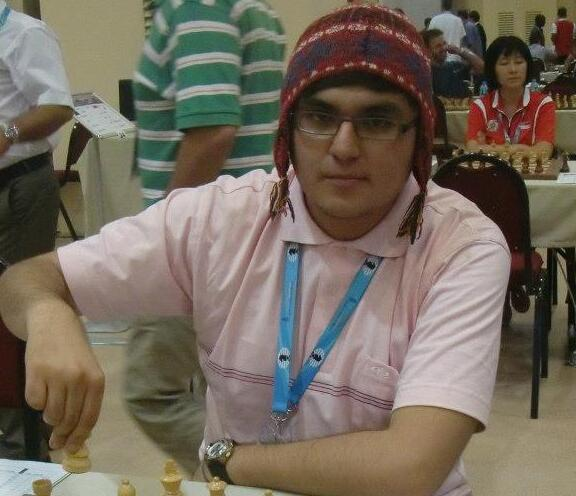
- Deivy Vera Sigueñas in 2012

Personal information
- Born: 18 January 1992 (age 34) Chicama, Peru

Chess career
- Country: Peru
- Title: Grandmaster (2020)
- FIDE rating: 2431 (July 2026)
- Peak rating: 2546 (January 2017)

Deivy Anthony Vera Sigueñas (born 18 January 1992) is a Peruvian chess grandmaster (2020).

== Biography ==
Deivy Vera Sigueñas two times shared first place in Peruvian Chess Championship: in 2012 when he ranked 2nd and in 2016 when he ranked 3rd. In 2012, he won International Chess Tournament in Lima. In 2013, he won team gold with Peru mixed team in Bolivarian Games. In the 6th Arica Open in 2019 he tied 2nd-8th place with Jose Eduardo Martinez Alcantara, Nikita Petrov, Renato R. Quintiliano Pinto, Cristobal Henriquez Villagra, Salvador Alonso, and Diego Saul Rod Flores Quillas.

Deivy Vera Sigueñas played for Peru in the Chess Olympiads:

- In 2012, at second board in the 40th Chess Olympiad in Istanbul (+5, =3, -3),
- In 2016, at third board in the 42nd Chess Olympiad in Baku (+4, =4, -2),
- In 2018, at second board in the 43rd Chess Olympiad in Batumi (+3, =1, -4).

In 2013, he was awarded the FIDE International Master (IM) title.
