= Dmitry Kryakvin =

Russian chess grandmaster (born 1984)

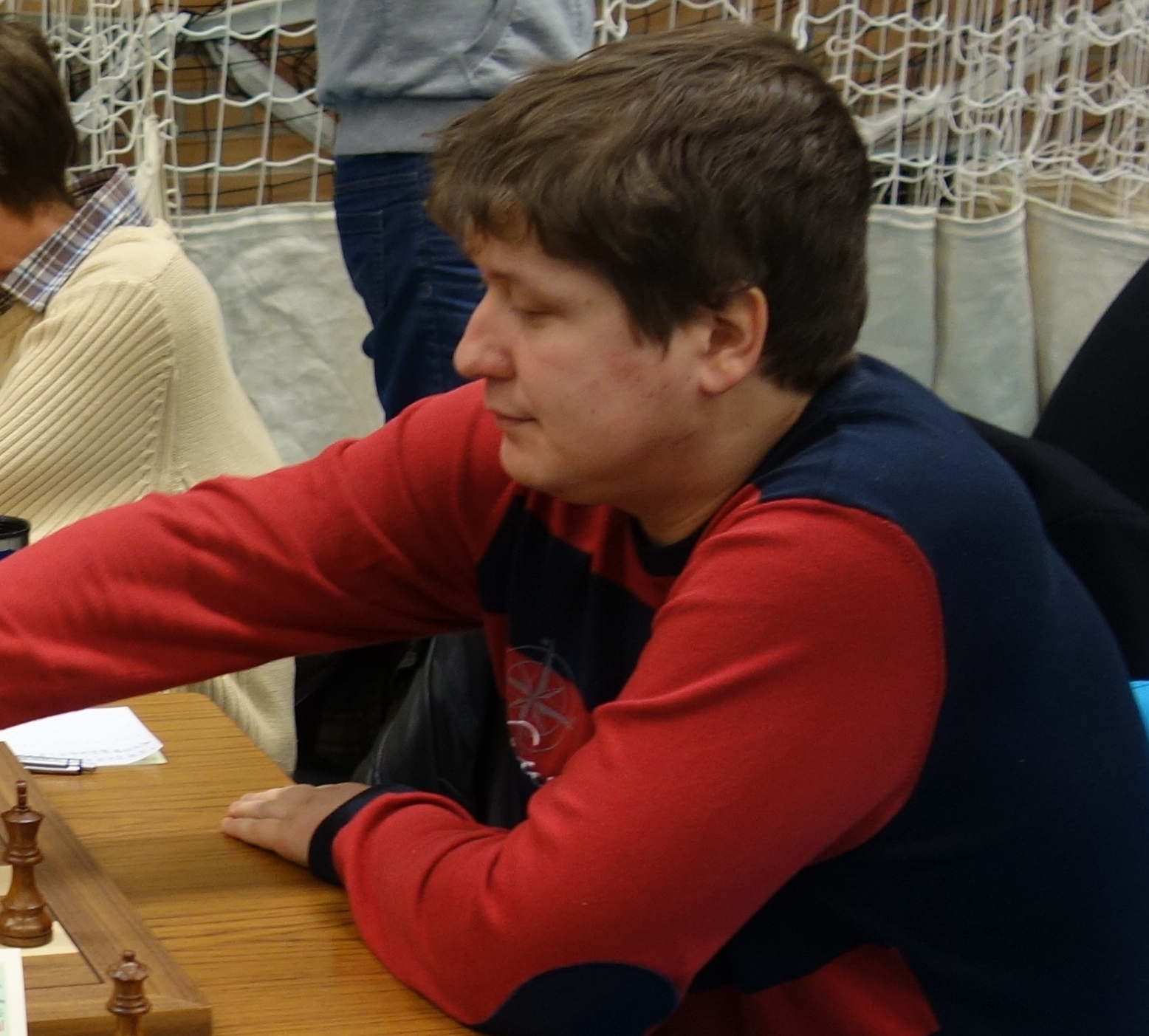
- Kryakvin in 2017

Personal information
- Born: April 10, 1984 (age 42) Rostov-on-Don, Russian SFSR, Soviet Union

Chess career
- Country: Russia
- Title: Grandmaster (2009)
- Peak rating: 2610 (September 2019)

Dmitry Vadimovich Kryakvin is a Russian chess grandmaster.

== Chess career ==
He has been a trainer at Anatoly Karpov's regional chess center. In April 2016, he held a simul in a Tyumen prison against 22 opponents, winning every game.

In March 2017, he won the Viktor Polyanichko Memorial Blitz with a score of 11.5/13.

In February 2018, he won the Serpukhov stage of the Russian Rapid Grand Prix with a score of 9/11.

In the 2021 Tuapse Open, he tied 2nd-4th place with Boris Grachev and Nikita Petrov.
