= Dmitry Frolyanov =

Russian chess grandmaster (born 1986)

Personal information
- Born: May 20, 1986 (age 40) Tolyatti, Soviet Union

Chess career
- Country: Russia
- Title: Grandmaster (2007)
- FIDE rating: 2442 (November 2026)
- Peak rating: 2616 (November 2010)

Dmitry Anatolyevich Frolyanov (Russian: Дмитрий Анатольевич Фрольянов; born 20 May 1986) is a Russian chess Grandmaster (2007).

== Chess career ==
In 2006, Frolyanov competed in the World Junior Chess Championship, finishing fifth and fulfilling the norms required for the Grandmaster title.

In June 2013, he participated in the World Rapid and Blitz Chess Championships.

He competed in two European Individual Chess Championships (2005 and 2007) as well as several other national and international tournaments.

He also played in the 2016 European Club Cup as a member of the Zhiguli chess club.
