= Klementy Sychev =

Russian chess grandmaster (born 1996)

Personal information
- Born: July 12, 1996 (age 29) Moscow, Russia

Chess career
- Country: Russia (until 2023); FIDE (since 2023)
- Title: Grandmaster (2019)
- FIDE rating: 2508 (July 2026)
- Peak rating: 2579 (June 2019)

Klementy Sergeevich Sychev is a Russian chess grandmaster.

== Chess career ==
He earned his GM norms at the:

- European Individual Chess Championship in June 2017
- 8th Andranik Margaryan Memorial in January 2018
- 9th Andranik Margaryan Memorial in January 2019

In July 2023, he tied for first place with five other players in the Russian Championships Higher League, but lost the title to Pavel Ponkratov on tiebreaks.

In the fourth round of the Abu Dhabi Masters in August 2024, he defeated the tournament's top seed Aravindh Chithambaram, who was rated 170 points higher.
