= FIDE Grand Swiss Tournament 2019 =

Chess tournament in Douglas, Isle of Man

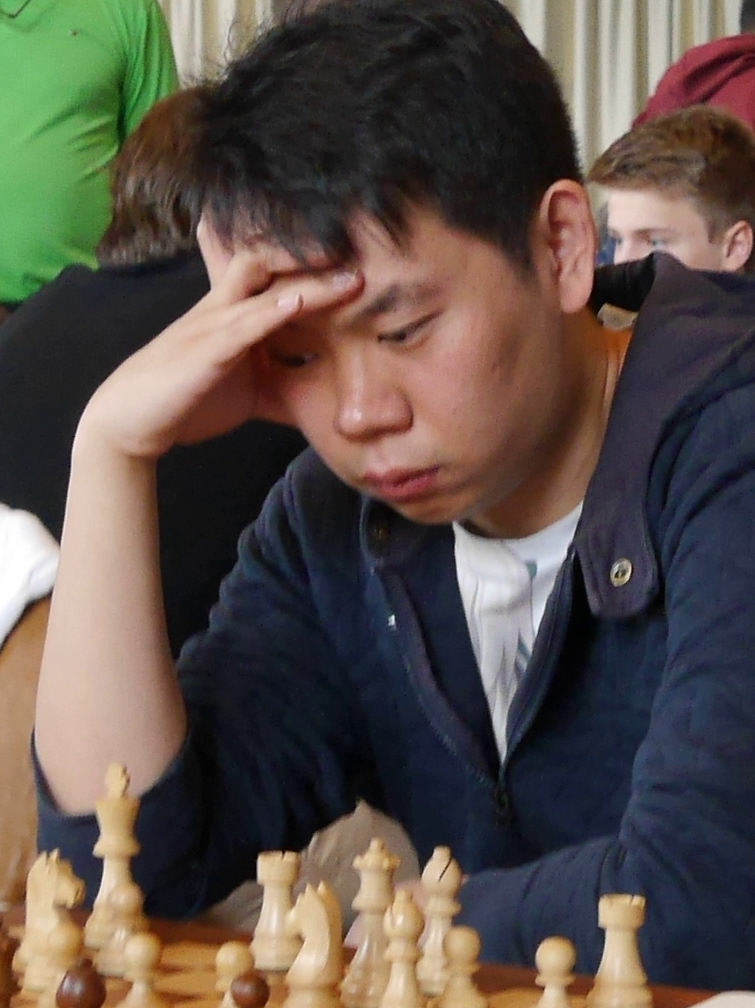
- 2019 Grand Swiss Tournament winner Wang Hao

Tournament information
- Sport: Chess
- Location: Douglas, Isle of Man
- Dates: 10 October 2019– 21 October 2019
- Administrator: FIDE
- Tournament format: Swiss-system tournament
- Host(s): IOM International; Chess Limited

Final positions
- Champion: (China) Wang Hao
- Runner-up: (United States) Fabiano Caruana

The FIDE Grand Swiss Tournament 2019 was a chess tournament that formed part of the qualification cycle for the World Chess Championship 2021. It was played from 10–21 October 2019 on the Isle of Man. This was the first time that a tournament of this type was used as a qualifying tournament for the Candidates Tournament.

Wang Hao and Fabiano Caruana shared first place, with Wang Hao winning on tie breaks and thereby qualifying for the 2020–21 Candidates Tournament. Of the players who shared third place, Kirill Alekseenko had the best tie break and became eligible for the Candidates wild card as the next-highest placed non-qualifier, as Caruana had already qualified for the Candidates by virtue of being the runner-up in the previous World Championship. Alekseenko was later selected as the Candidates wild card.

The highest-placed female players were Harika Dronavalli (83rd) and Dinara Saduakassova (85th), with Harika winning the women's trophy on tie breaks.

== Format ==
The tournament was an 11-round Swiss-system tournament, with 120 players invited by FIDE, including 100 qualifying by rating. 40 wildcards were invited by the organizers. The qualification by rating was based on the average of the 12 rating lists from July 2018 to June 2019. The list of qualifiers (except for those qualifying by continental championships or wildcards) was published on 10 June 2019.

The time control for the games was:

- Time limit of 100 minutes, + 50 minutes added after move 40, + 15 minutes added after move 60, + 30 second per move increment from move 1.

=== Tie breaks ===
In the event of a tie for first, the following tie breaks were applied, in order:

- Average rating of opponents, Cut 1 (that is, after excluding the lowest rated opponent);
- Buchholz Cut 1 method: Average score of opponents, excluding the lowest scoring opponent;
- Buchholz method: Average score of opponents;
- Individual games between tied players;
- Drawing of lots.

== Schedule ==
The first six rounds were played from 10 to 15 October, and the last five rounds from 17 to 21 October.

- Round 1: 10 October — 3:00 p.m. (CEST)
- Round 2: 11 October — 3:00 p.m. (CEST)
- Round 3: 12 October — 3:00 p.m. (CEST)
- Round 4: 13 October — 3:00 p.m. (CEST)
- Round 5: 14 October — 3:00 p.m. (CEST)
- Round 6: 15 October — 3:00 p.m. (CEST)
- Rest day: 16 October
- Round 7: 17 October — 3:00 p.m. (CEST)
- Round 8: 18 October — 3:00 p.m. (CEST)
- Round 9: 19 October — 3:00 p.m. (CEST)
- Round 10: 20 October — 3:00 p.m. (CEST)
- Round 11: 21 October — 1:30 p.m. (CEST)

=== Prize money ===
The prize money was $70,000 for the winner and $10,000 for the best woman.

Position	(US$) Tournament Prize received	(US$) Women Prize received
1st	70,000	10,000
2nd	50,000	8,000
3rd	40,000	6,000
4th	35,000	4,000
5th	30,000	2,500
6th	25,000	2,500
7th	20,000	—
8th	16,000	—
9th	13,000	—
10th	11,000	—
11th-15th	8,000 each	—
16th-20th	5,000 each	—
21st-25th	3,000 each	—
26th-30th	2,000 each	—
Total (US$)	433,000	

== Participants and results ==
154 players played in the Grand Swiss. 118 players were from FIDE's qualification criteria and 36 players were wildcards chosen by the organizers.

The participants, their FIDE ratings as of October 2019 and the results are listed here (hover over results to see opponents). The "Rank" column takes account of tie breaks.

Rank	Name	Rating	1	2	3	4	5	6	7	8	9	10	11	Total
1	Wang Hao (CHN)	2726	1	1	1	½	½	1	0	½	½	1	1	8.0
2	Fabiano Caruana (USA)	2812	1	1	1	½	½	1	½	½	½	1	½	8.0
3	Kirill Alekseenko (RUS)	2674	½	1	1	½	½	1	½	½	½	1	½	7.5
4	Levon Aronian (ARM)	2758	½	½	1	1	½	1	1	½	½	½	½	7.5
5	David Antón Guijarro (ESP)	2674	1	½	½	1	½	1	½	1	½	0	1	7.5
6	Magnus Carlsen (NOR)	2876	1	½	½	½	1	1	½	½	½	1	½	7.5
7	Hikaru Nakamura (USA)	2745	½	1	½	½	½	1	½	1	1	½	½	7.5
8	Nikita Vitiugov (RUS)	2732	1	½	1	½	½	1	½	½	½	1	½	7.5
9	Alexander Grischuk (RUS)	2759	½	1	1	½	1	½	½	0	1	0	1	7.0
10	David Paravyan (RUS)	2602	½	½	1	0	½	½	½	1	1	1	½	7.0
11	David Howell (ENG)	2694	0	1	1	½	0	1	½	1	1	1	0	7.0
12	Vidit Gujrathi (IND)	2718	1	½	1	0	½	½	½	½	1	½	1	7.0
13	Lê Quang Liêm (VIE)	2708	½	½	½	½	½	1	½	1	½	1	½	7.0
14	Parham Maghsoodloo (IRI)	2664	½	1	1	1	½	½	½	½	½	0	½	6.5
15	Nijat Abasov (AZE)	2632	½	½	½	1	½	½	½	½	1	½	½	6.5
16	Vladislav Kovalev (BLR)	2661	½	½	1	½	½	1	½	1	0	½	½	6.5
17	Vladimir Fedoseev (RUS)	2664	1	½	1	½	1	0	½	0	½	½	1	6.5
18	Aleksandr Rakhmanov (RUS)	2621	½	0	1	1	½	½	½	1	1	0	½	6.5
19	Yuriy Kryvoruchko (UKR)	2669	½	½	1	1	½	½	½	½	½	½	½	6.5
20	Constantin Lupulescu (ROU)	2643	½	1	½	½	½	½	½	½	½	½	1	6.5
21	Hrant Melkumyan (ARM)	2650	1	½	½	0	½	1	1	0	½	1	½	6.5
22	Maxim Matlakov (RUS)	2716	½	1	½	½	½	½	½	1	1	0	½	6.5
23	Sergey Karjakin (RUS)	2760	½	½	1	1	½	½	½	1	½	0	½	6.5
24	Yu Yangyi (CHN)	2763	1	½	½	½	½	1	½	½	½	½	½	6.5
25	Yuriy Kuzubov (UKR)	2636	0	1	1	½	½	½	0	½	1	½	1	6.5
26	Viswanathan Anand (IND)	2765	0	1	½	½	1	1	½	1	½	0	½	6.5
27	Wesley So (USA)	2767	½	½	½	½	1	½	1	½	½	½	½	6.5
28	Radoslaw Wojtaszek (POL)	2748	½	1	½	1	0	1	½	0	½	1	½	6.5
29	Peter Svidler (RUS)	2729	½	1	½	½	½	½	½	1	½	½	½	6.5
30	Nguyễn Ngọc Trường Sơn (VIE)	2638	1	½	0	½	½	½	1	½	1	½	½	6.5
31	Samuel Sevian (USA)	2654	1	0	1	0	½	½	½	1	1	½	½	6.5
32	Jeffery Xiong (USA)	2708	1	0	½	½	1	½	½	1	½	½	½	6.5
33	Pentala Harikrishna (IND)	2748	½	½	1	½	½	0	½	½	1	1	½	6.5
34	Ray Robson (USA)	2670	½	½	1	½	½	½	1	½	½	½	½	6.5
35	Grigoriy Oparin (RUS)	2654	1	½	0	½	½	½	½	½	1	½	1	6.5
36	S. P. Sethuraman (IND)	2624	0	0	1	1	½	1	½	½	½	1	½	6.5
37	Robert Hovhannisyan (ARM)	2639	½	½	1	½	½	1	½	½	½	1	0	6.5
38	Francisco Vallejo Pons (ESP)	2694	½	½	½	½	½	½	½	1	1	0	1	6.5
39	Nils Grandelius (SWE)	2691	½	½	0	½	1	1	½	½	½	1	½	6.5
40	Aleksey Dreev (RUS)	2662	1	½	½	1	½	0	1	0	½	½	1	6.5
41	Krishnan Sasikiran (IND)	2675	½	½	1	½	½	½	0	½	1	½	1	6.5
42	Peter Leko (HUN)	2670	½	½	½	1	½	½	½	½	½	1	½	6.5
43	Alexey Sarana (RUS)	2655	1	½	½	½	½	½	½	0	½	1	½	6.0
44	Evgeniy Najer (RUS)	2635	1	½	½	½	½	½	½	0	1	½	½	6.0
45	Bogdan-Daniel Deac (ROU)	2613	½	½	½	1	½	½	0	1	½	1	0	6.0
46	Nodirbek Abdusattorov (UZB)	2608	1	½	0	1	1	0	½	½	½	½	½	6.0
47	S. L. Narayanan (IND)	2611	½	½	½	½	½	½	1	½	½	0	1	6.0
48	Gukesh D (IND)	2520	½	½	0	½	0	1	1	1	½	½	½	6.0
49	Rinat Jumabayev (KAZ)	2630	½	½	0	1	1	1	½	0	½	0	1	6.0
50	Vladimir Akopian (ARM)	2638	½	1	½	½	1	0	½	½	½	½	½	6.0
51	Boris Gelfand (ISR)	2686	½	1	½	1	½	½	½	1	0	½	0	6.0
52	Ivan Cheparinov (GEO)	2670	1	½	1	½	0	½	½	½	½	½	½	6.0
53	Zhang Zhong (CHN)	2636	0	0	1	1	1	½	1	0	½	½	½	6.0
54	Gabriel Sargissian (ARM)	2690	½	1	1	½	0	½	½	½	½	½	½	6.0
55	Anton Korobov (UKR)	2679	½	1	½	½	½	½	½	½	½	½	½	6.0
56	Andrey Esipenko (RUS)	2624	0	1	0	½	1	0	1	½	1	½	½	6.0
57	Sandro Mareco (ARG)	2634	0	1	1	0	½	½	½	1	½	½	½	6.0
58	Gata Kamsky (USA)	2685	½	½	1	0	½	½	½	½	½	½	1	6.0
59	Ernesto Inarkiev (RUS)	2693	½	0	½	½	½	1	½	1	½	½	½	6.0
60	Alexander Riazantsev (RUS)	2645	1	0	1	½	½	0	½	0	1	½	1	6.0
61	Alexander Moiseenko (UKR)	2635	½	1	0	0	½	1	½	1	½	½	½	6.0
62	Sanan Sjugirov (RUS)	2662	0	1	0	1	1	½	½	½	0	1	½	6.0
63	Ivan Šarić (CRO)	2667	½	½	1	½	0	1	½	0	1	½	½	6.0
64	Pavel Eljanov (UKR)	2663	½	1	½	½	½	½	½	½	½	½	½	6.0
65	Baskaran Adhiban (IND)	2639	1	1	½	0	1	½	½	½	½	0	0	5.5
66	Alexei Shirov (ESP)	2664	1	1	0	1	1	0	½	½	0	0	½	5.5
67	Jorden van Foreest (NED)	2621	½	½	½	½	½	½	½	½	½	½	½	5.5
68	Aryan Tari (NOR)	2630	½	0	1	½	½	1	1	½	0	½	0	5.5
69	Rauf Mamedov (AZE)	2645	1	0	1	½	½	½	½	½	½	0	½	5.5
70	Andrei Volokitin (UKR)	2627	0	1	½	½	½	½	½	½	0	1	½	5.5
71	Raunak Sadhwani (IND)	2479	1	½	½	½	½	½	½	0	1	0	½	5.5
72	Rustam Kasimdzhanov (UZB)	2657	½	1	½	½	½	½	½	1	0	0	½	5.5
73	Luke McShane (ENG)	2682	½	1	1	1	½	0	½	½	½	0	0	5.5
74	Robert Hess (USA)	2581	½	0	0	1	½	½	1	0	1	1	0	5.5
75	Erwin l'Ami (NED)	2619	1	0	0	1	0	1	½	0	1	½	½	5.5
76	Jonas Buhl Bjerre (DEN)	2506	½	½	½	1	0	½	½	½	½	1	0	5.5
77	Eltaj Safarli (AZE)	2593	½	1	½	0	½	½	½	½	½	½	½	5.5
78	Mustafa Yılmaz (TUR)	2595	½	½	½	½	½	0	1	½	½	½	½	5.5
79	Viktor Erdős (HUN)	2604	½	½	½	½	½	½	½	½	½	½	½	5.5
80	Lu Shanglei (CHN)	2602	½	0	½	1	½	½	½	½	0	1	½	5.5
81	Matthias Blübaum (GER)	2643	1	½	½	1	½	0	½	0	½	½	½	5.5
82	Varuzhan Akobian (USA)	2625	½	0	1	½	½	0	1	0	1	½	½	5.5
83	Harika Dronavalli (IND)	2495	½	½	0	½	½	½	1	0	1	½	½	5.5
84	Ioannis Papaioannou (GRE)	2645	½	1	½	½	½	½	½	0	½	½	½	5.5
85	Dinara Saduakassova (KAZ)	2481	½	0	½	1	½	½	½	½	0	½	1	5.5
86	Bu Xiangzhi (CHN)	2721	1	1	0	½	½	½	0	½	½	½	½	5.5
87	Baadur Jobava (GEO)	2617	1	½	0	0	1	0	1	½	½	½	½	5.5
88	Vladislav Artemiev (RUS)	2746	1	½	½	½	½	½	½	½	0	½	½	5.5
89	Surya Shekhar Ganguly (IND)	2658	½	1	½	½	0	1	0	½	½	½	½	5.5
90	Tal Baron (ISR)	2531	0	0	1	1	0	1	½	1	0	½	½	5.5
91	Bassem Amin (EGY)	2699	½	1	½	0	½	1	0	½	½	1	0	5.5
92	Anton Demchenko (RUS)	2655	1	½	½	0	1	0	0	½	0	1	1	5.5
93	Markus Ragger (AUT)	2684	½	½	½	1	0	½	1	1	0	½	0	5.5
94	Mircea Pârligras (ROU)	2629	½	0	1	½	0	½	0	1	1	½	½	5.5
95	Etienne Bacrot (FRA)	2671	½	½	½	1	½	0	½	½	½	½	½	5.5
96	Evgeny Alekseev (RUS)	2629	½	0	½	½	1	½	½	½	½	½	½	5.5
97	Zahar Efimenko (UKR)	2604	½	½	½	½	0	½	½	0	½	1	1	5.5
98	Alexander Motylev (RUS)	2651	1	½	0	½	½	½	½	½	0	1	½	5.5
99	Ferenc Berkes (HUN)	2667	½	½	½	0	1	½	½	½	½	½	½	5.5
100	Maksim Chigaev (RUS)	2644	½	1	0	½	½	½	½	½	1	0	½	5.5
101	Daniil Dubov (RUS)	2699	½	½	½	0	½	0	½	½	1	½	1	5.5
102	Vadim Zvjaginsev (RUS)	2644	½	½	½	½	½	½	½	0	½	½	1	5.5
103	Kacper Piorun (POL)	2643	½	1	0	0	½	½	0	1	0	1	1	5.5
104	Sergei Movsesian (ARM)	2654	½	0	0	0	1	½	½	1	1	½	½	5.5
105	Abhimanyu Puranik (IND)	2571	½	0	1	½	1	½	½	0	½	½	0	5.0
106	Daniele Vocaturo (ITA)	2620	0	1	0	½	1	½	½	½	½	0	½	5.0
107	Batkhuyagiin Möngöntuul (MGL)	2421	½	1	½	0	0	½	½	½	0	1	½	5.0
108	Lei Tingjie (CHN)	2469	½	0	½	½	½	½	½	0	½	½	1	5.0
109	Johan-Sebastian Christiansen (NOR)	2558	½	½	½	½	½	0	½	½	0	1	½	5.0
110	Aleksandr Lenderman (USA)	2648	½	½	1	1	½	0	½	½	0	0	½	5.0
111	Ariel Erenberg (ISR)	2463	½	½	0	½	½	1	0	0	1	0	1	5.0
112	Eric Hansen (CAN)	2611	½	0	1	0	1	½	0	1	0	½	½	5.0
113	Vasif Durarbayli (AZE)	2617	½	½	½	½	0	0	1	1	0	1	0	5.0
114	Sam Shankland (USA)	2705	0	1	½	½	½	½	½	0	0	½	1	5.0
115	Tamir Nabaty (ISR)	2658	½	0	½	1	1	0	½	1	0	½	0	5.0
116	Alina Kashlinskaya (RUS)	2481	0	0	1	0	½	½	1	½	1	½	0	5.0
117	Axel Bachmann (PAR)	2629	½	0	½	1	0	½	0	1	0	1	½	5.0
118	Gawain Jones (ENG)	2688	0	0	1	½	½	½	½	1	0	½	½	5.0
119	Vincent Keymer (GER)	2506	½	½	1	½	½	0	½	0	½	½	0	4.5
120	Niclas Huschenbeth (GER)	2624	0	1	½	½	½	0	½	½	½	½	0	4.5
121	Nihal Sarin (IND)	2610	½	0	1	0	1	½	½	½	0	½	0	4.5
122	Andrey Vovk (UKR)	2618	½	1	0	0	1	0	½	1	½	0	0	4.5
123	Ruslan Ponomariov (UKR)	2675	½	½	½	1	½	0	½	0	½	0	½	4.5
124	Fy Antenaina Rakotomaharo (MAD)	2428	½	0	0	1	0	½	½	0	1	0	1	4.5
125	Lance Henderson de La Fuente (ESP)	2494	½	0	½	0	1	0	½	½	1	0	½	4.5
126	Soumya Swaminathan (IND)	2365	½	½	0	½	0	½	1	1	0	0	½	4.5
127	Antoaneta Stefanova (BUL)	2479	0	1	0	0	1	½	0	1	0	½	½	4.5
128	Ahmed Adly (EGY)	2636	1	½	½	0	0	½	0	1	1	0	0	4.5
129	Maxim Rodshtein (ISR)	2684	½	0	1	½	½	0	0	0	0	1	1	4.5
130	Karen Movsziszian (ARM)	2475	½	½	0	0	½	½	0	1	0	1	½	4.5
131	Keith Arkell (ENG)	2447	0	0	0	1	½	½	½	0	1	½	½	4.5
132	Nino Batsiashvili (GEO)	2422	0	0	0	½	1	½	0	½	0	1	1	4.5
133	Eduardo Iturrizaga (VEN)	2629	0	0	1	0	½	0	1	½	½	1	0	4.5
134	Pia Cramling (SWE)	2462	0	0	1	½	0	½	0	½	½	1	½	4.5
135	Anna Ushenina (UKR)	2431	½	0	0	1	0	1	0	1	0	0	½	4.0
136	David Gavrilescu (ROU)	2451	½	½	0	0	0	1	½	½	0	1	0	4.0
137	Avital Boruchovsky (ISR)	2533	½	½	0	½	½	0	½	0	1	0	½	4.0
138	Marie Sebag (FRA)	2445	0	1	½	0	0	½	0	0	1	0	1	4.0
139	Yuri Gonzalez Vidal (CUB)	2552	0	1	0	½	0	1	1	0	0	½	0	4.0
140	Elina Danielian (ARM)	2385	0	1	0	0	½	½	1	0	½	½	0	4.0
141	Brandon Clarke (ENG)	2445	0	1	0	0	0	1	1	0	0	0	1	4.0
142	Vlastimil Jansa (CZE)	2452	0	0	0	½	½	0	1	0	0	1	1	4.0
143	Jovanka Houska (ENG)	2430	0	0	1	½	0	0	1	0	1	0	0	3.5
144	Ekaterina Atalik (TUR)	2464	½	½	0	0	0	0	1	½	1	0	0	3.5
145	Irina Bulmaga (ROU)	2442	0	0	0	1	½	0	0	1	1	0	0	3.5
146	Anna Zatonskih (USA)	2422	½	0	0	1	0	1	0	0	½	0	0	3.0
147	Prithu Gupta (IND)	2493	0	0	0	1	1	0	0	1	0	0	0	3.0
148	Dietmar Kolbus (GER)	2300	½	0	0	0	½	1	0	½	0	0	½	3.0
149	Baard Dahl (ENG)	2067	0	1	0	0	0	0	0	½	½	1	0	3.0
150	Wu Li (ENG)	2332	0	0	0	0	½	0	1	0	0	½	1	3.0
151	Vera Nebolsina (RUS)	2252	½	0	0	0	0	0	0	1	½	½	½	3.0
152	Keith Allen (IRL)	2161	0	0	0	0	½	1	0	½	1	0	0	3.0
153	Kenny Solomon (RSA)	2382	½	0	0	0	½	½	1	0	0	0	0	2.5
154	Elisabeth Pähtz (GER)	2489	½	0	0	0	½	½	0	0	0	0	0	1.5
