= Baard Dahl =

Norwegian poker and chess player (born 1970)

Personal information
- Born: August 11, 1970 (age 55) Oslo, Norway

Chess career
- Country: England (until 2025); Malta (since 2025)
- Peak rating: 2160 (February 2018)

Baard Viggo Dahl is a Norwegian poker and chess player.

== Poker career ==
In October 2004, he finished in 4th place at the EPT London European Poker Classics, which was the second leg of the European Poker Tour season 1 results.

In October 2014, he played in the PokerStars Isle of Man tournament, which combined poker and chess. At the start of the event, Jennifer Shahade held a simultaneous "chess & poker" event where she took on three opponents in both games; Dahl was the only player who defeated her in their poker game.

== Chess career ==
In 2017, he won the Manx Chess Championship.

In October 2018, he was one of two players out of a field of 20 who managed to draw against super-grandmaster Wesley So, who held a simultaneous exhibition in the Isle of Man.

In October 2019, he played in the FIDE Grand Swiss Tournament 2019, where he was the lowest-rated player but managed to defeat Dietmar Kolbus and hold draws against Vera Nebolsina and Keith Allen.
