= FIDE Grand Swiss Tournament 2023 =

Chess tournament in Douglas, Isle of Man

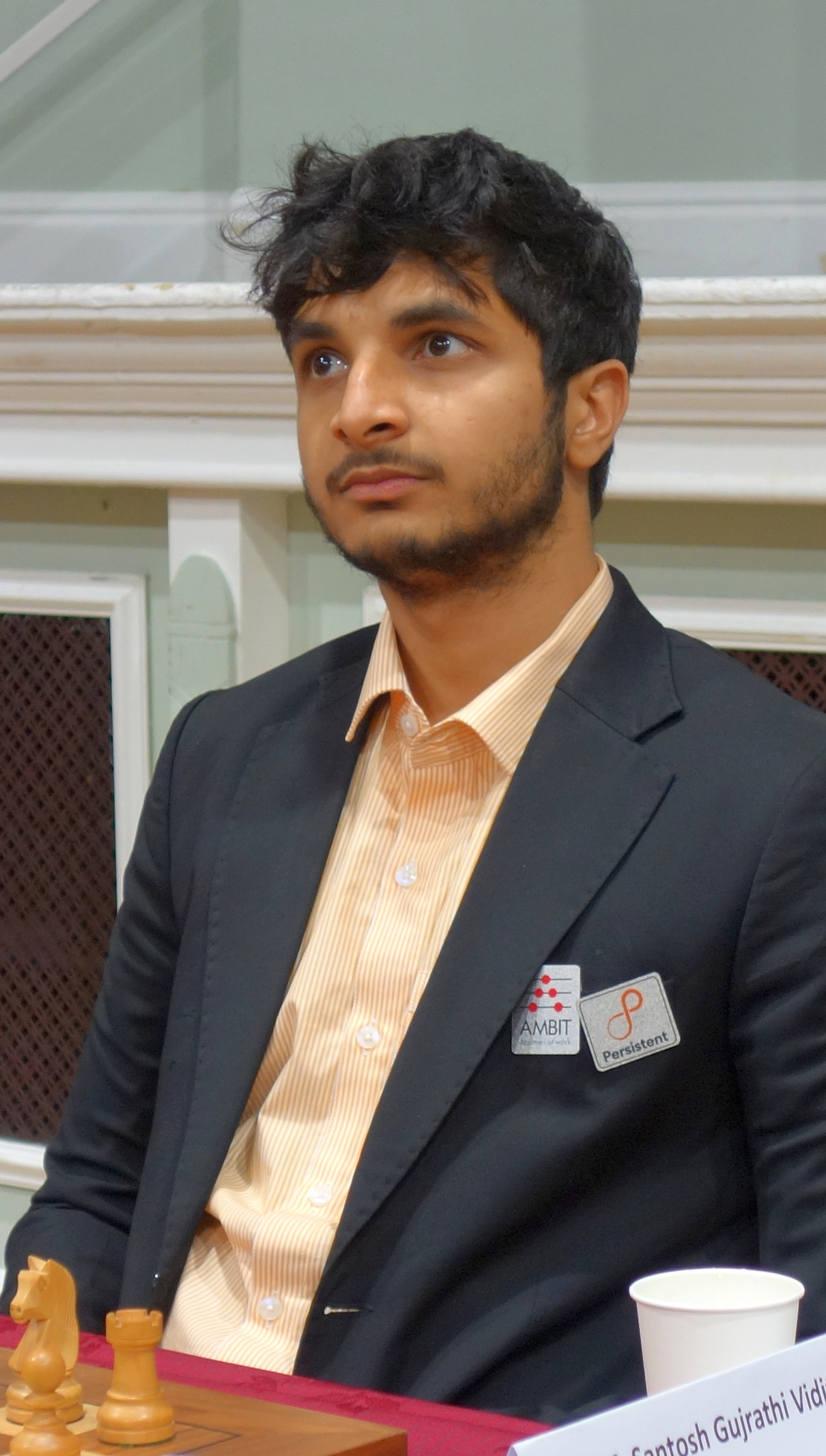
- 2023 Grand Swiss Tournament winner Vidit Gujrathi

Tournament information
- Sport: Chess
- Location: Douglas, Isle of Man
- Dates: 25 October 2023– 5 November 2023
- Administrator: FIDE
- Format: 11-round Swiss-system tournament
- Host(s): IOM International Chess Limited, sponsored by Scheinberg family
- Venue: Villa Marina

Final positions
- Champion: (India) Vidit Gujrathi
- Runner-up: (United States) Hikaru Nakamura

The FIDE Grand Swiss Tournament 2023 was a chess tournament that formed part of the qualification cycle for the World Chess Championship 2024. It was an 11-round Swiss-system tournament with 114 players competing from 25 October to 5 November 2023 in the Isle of Man. The winner and runner-up of the tournament (Vidit Gujrathi and Hikaru Nakamura) earned the right to play in the Candidates Tournament 2024.

The event was held in parallel with the FIDE Women's Grand Swiss Tournament 2023.

== Format ==
The tournament was played with an 11-round Swiss format, with pairings made using the Dutch system for Swiss tournaments.

The games used classical time controls with 100 minutes for the first 40 moves, then 50 minutes for the next 20 moves, then 15 minutes for the rest of the game, with a per-move increment of 30 seconds.

=== Tie-breaks ===
Tie-breaks between players who finished on the same score were determined, in order, by the following tie-breaks:

1. Average rating of opponents, cut 1;
2. Buchholz system, cut 1;
3. Buchholz system;
4. The results of individual games between tied players;
5. Drawing of lots.

=== Venue and schedule ===
The tournament ran from 25 October to 5 November 2023 in the Isle of Man, the planned location for the previous Grand Swiss tournament and the location of the inaugural one. Games were played at the Royal Hall of the Villa Marina.

Date	Event
24 October	Opening ceremony
25 October	Round 1
26 October	Round 2
27 October	Round 3
28 October	Round 4
29 October	Round 5
30 October	Round 6
31 October	Free day
1 November	Round 7
2 November	Round 8
3 November	Round 9
4 November	Round 10
5 November	Round 11
5 November	Closing ceremony

=== Qualification ===
On 25 July, 2023, FIDE announced a preliminary list of 100 confirmed participants. FIDE also stated that the finalized lineup was expected to be available in September and was expected to have 114 players.

Under FIDE regulations, the initial 114 invites were distributed as follows:

- 100 qualifiers by rating - the top 100 players in the FIDE rating list of 1 June 2023 (Note: Only players who played at least 10 rated games counted in any of the 12 FIDE rating periods from July 2022 to June 2023 were eligible.)
- The Women's World Champion as of 31 December 2022 (Ju Wenjun)
- 4 continental spots, each nominated by one of the four FIDE continental presidents
- 4 players nominated by the FIDE president (including a player who reached the final 16 of the World Cup, and the highest rated player who was not yet qualified)
- Up to 5 players nominated by the organizer (Isle of Man International Chess Limited)

Various methods were also specified to replace a player who declined an invitation.

== Results ==
Notation: "0 (B 70)" indicates a loss (0 points) with black pieces (B) against the player who finished 70th (Erwin l'Ami). The first tiebreak (labeled AROC-1) is the average rating of opponents "cut 1" (viz. excluding the lowest-rated opponent), which was sufficient to determine the qualifiers.

Rank	Name	Rating	1	2	3	4	5	6	7	8	9	10	11	Total	AROC-1
1	(India) Vidit Gujrathi	2716	0 (B 70)	1 (W 102)	1 (B 105)	1 (W 40)	0.5 (B 28)	1 (W 29)	1 (B 8)	0.5 (W 2)	0.5 (W 3)	1 (B 20)	1 (W 9)	8.5	2671
2	(United States) Hikaru Nakamura	2780	0.5 (W 88)	0.5 (B 60)	1 (W 68)	1 (B 44)	1 (W 21)	0.5 (B 3)	0.5 (W 9)	0.5 (B 1)	1 (W 17)	1 (W 10)	0.5 (B 4)	8	2687
3	(FIDE) Andrey Esipenko	2683	1 (W 98)	1 (B 71)	0.5 (W 9)	1 (B 101)	0.5 (W 10)	0.5 (W 2)	0.5 (B 4)	1 (W 5)	0.5 (B 1)	1 (W 6)	0 (B 7)	7.5	2702
4	(India) Arjun Erigaisi	2712	1 (W 53)	1 (B 25)	0.5 (W 21)	0.5 (B 9)	1 (W 71)	0.5 (B 41)	0.5 (W 3)	0.5 (W 34)	0.5 (B 26)	1 (B 22)	0.5 (W 2)	7.5	2681
5	(Germany) Vincent Keymer	2717	0.5 (W 56)	0.5 (B 68)	1 (W 92)	1 (B 48)	0.5 (W 9)	0.5 (B 14)	1 (W 37)	0 (B 3)	1 (W 45)	1 (W 26)	0.5 (B 10)	7.5	2673
6	(Iran) Parham Maghsoodloo	2707	1 (W 34)	0.5 (B 86)	0.5 (W 37)	0 (B 28)	1 (W 60)	0.5 (B 46)	1 (W 30)	1 (B 15)	1 (W 21)	0 (B 3)	1 (W 24)	7.5	2660
7	(Netherlands) Anish Giri	2760	0.5 (W 60)	1 (B 88)	0.5 (W 18)	0.5 (B 19)	0.5 (W 37)	0.5 (B 69)	0.5 (W 25)	0.5 (B 16)	1 (W 38)	1 (B 29)	1 (W 3)	7.5	2657
8	(Uzbekistan) Javokhir Sindarov	2658	0.5 (W 101)	1 (B 109)	1 (W 23)	0.5 (B 10)	0.5 (W 41)	1 (B 22)	0 (W 1)	0.5 (B 24)	0.5 (W 27)	0.5 (B 12)	1 (W 43)	7	2707
9	(Serbia) Alexandr Predke	2656	1 (B 96)	1 (W 11)	0.5 (B 3)	0.5 (W 4)	0.5 (B 5)	1 (W 61)	0.5 (B 2)	0.5 (W 26)	0.5 (B 18)	1 (W 34)	0 (B 1)	7	2702
10	(United States) Fabiano Caruana	2786	1 (B 31)	1 (W 29)	0.5 (B 70)	0.5 (W 8)	0.5 (B 3)	1 (W 28)	0.5 (B 19)	1 (W 18)	0.5 (W 20)	0 (B 2)	0.5 (W 5)	7	2684
11	(Poland) Jan-Krzysztof Duda	2726	1 (W 92)	0 (B 9)	1 (W 56)	0.5 (B 18)	0.5 (W 46)	0.5 (B 16)	1 (W 86)	0 (B 17)	1 (W 69)	0.5 (B 25)	1 (W 37)	7	2650
12	(Uzbekistan) Nodirbek Abdusattorov	2716	1 (B 36)	0.5 (W 32)	0.5 (B 40)	0.5 (W 17)	0.5 (B 86)	0.5 (W 30)	0.5 (B 28)	0.5 (W 31)	1 (B 58)	0.5 (W 8)	1 (B 34)	7	2648
13	(India) R Praggnanandhaa	2738	0.5 (W 68)	0.5 (B 56)	0.5 (W 60)	0.5 (B 16)	0.5 (W 104)	0.5 (B 36)	1 (W 102)	0.5 (B 14)	1 (W 71)	0.5 (B 37)	1 (W 20)	7	2637
14	(Uzbekistan) Nodirbek Yakubboev	2616	0 (B 82)	1 (W 114)	0.5 (B 93)	1 (W 51)	1 (B 83)	0.5 (W 5)	0 (B 20)	0.5 (W 13)	1 (B 61)	0.5 (W 18)	0.5 (B 39)	6.5	2706
15	(Armenia) Samvel Ter-Sahakyan	2618	0.5 (W 43)	1 (B 84)	0 (W 22)	0 (B 45)	1 (W 110)	1 (B 49)	1 (W 40)	0 (W 6)	1 (B 42)	0.5 (B 23)	0.5 (W 21)	6.5	2701
16	(Turkey) Mustafa Yılmaz	2640	0 (B 42)	0.5 (W 87)	1 (B 112)	0.5 (W 13)	1 (B 82)	0.5 (W 11)	0.5 (B 61)	0.5 (W 7)	0.5 (B 40)	0.5 (W 66)	1 (B 62)	6.5	2699
17	(Bulgaria) Ivan Cheparinov	2658	1 (W 78)	0.5 (B 23)	0.5 (W 41)	0.5 (B 12)	0.5 (W 24)	0.5 (B 76)	1 (W 73)	1 (W 11)	0 (B 2)	0.5 (B 21)	0.5 (W 27)	6.5	2698
18	(France) Étienne Bacrot	2669	1 (B 87)	0.5 (W 42)	0.5 (B 7)	0.5 (W 11)	0.5 (B 33)	1 (W 57)	1 (W 41)	0 (B 10)	0.5 (W 9)	0.5 (B 14)	0.5 (W 23)	6.5	2695
19	(Poland) Radosław Wojtaszek	2714	0.5 (B 112)	0.5 (W 77)	1 (B 80)	0.5 (W 7)	1 (B 101)	1 (W 70)	0.5 (W 10)	0 (B 20)	0.5 (W 23)	0.5 (B 27)	0.5 (W 22)	6.5	2674
20	(Romania) Bogdan-Daniel Deac	2701	0.5 (W 73)	1 (B 99)	0.5 (W 86)	0.5 (B 37)	0.5 (W 34)	1 (B 71)	1 (W 14)	1 (W 19)	0.5 (B 10)	0 (W 1)	0 (B 13)	6.5	2671
21	(Serbia) Alexey Sarana	2682	1 (B 59)	1 (W 89)	0.5 (B 4)	0.5 (W 69)	0 (B 2)	1 (W 55)	0.5 (B 39)	1 (W 42)	0 (B 6)	0.5 (W 17)	0.5 (B 15)	6.5	2666
22	(United States) Samuel Sevian	2698	1 (B 74)	0.5 (W 30)	1 (B 15)	0.5 (W 70)	0.5 (B 69)	0 (W 8)	1 (B 52)	1 (W 39)	0.5 (B 34)	0 (W 4)	0.5 (B 19)	6.5	2654
23	(United States) Levon Aronian	2742	1 (B 95)	0.5 (W 17)	0 (B 8)	0.5 (B 54)	0.5 (B 47)	1 (W 105)	1 (B 32)	0.5 (W 29)	0.5 (B 19)	0.5 (W 15)	0.5 (B 18)	6.5	2653
24	(England) Nikita Vitiugov	2711	0.5 (B 72)	1 (B 58)	0.5 (B 32)	0.5 (W 30)	0.5 (B 17)	0.5 (W 86)	1 (B 70)	0.5 (W 8)	0.5 (B 29)	1 (W 35)	0 (B 6)	6.5	2653
25	(Spain) David Antón Guijarro	2653	1 (B 67)	0 (W 4)	0.5 (B 77)	0 (W 35)	0.5 (B 52)	1 (W 101)	0.5 (B 7)	0.5 (W 53)	1 (B 36)	0.5 (W 11)	0.5 (B 26)	6.5	2646
26	(Slovenia) Vladimir Fedoseev	2691	1 (B 102)	0 (W 70)	1 (B 64)	0.5 (W 33)	0.5 (B 55)	1 (W 31)	1 (W 69)	0.5 (B 9)	0.5 (W 4)	0 (B 5)	0.5 (W 25)	6.5	2645
27	(France) Maxime Vachier-Lagrave	2727	0.5 (B 58)	0.5 (W 72)	0.5 (B 54)	0.5 (W 36)	0 (B 31)	1 (W 92)	1 (B 55)	1 (W 47)	0.5 (B 8)	0.5 (W 19)	0.5 (B 17)	6.5	2644
28	(FIDE) Evgeniy Najer	2648	1 (B 114)	0.5 (W 82)	0.5 (B 61)	1 (W 6)	0.5 (W 1)	0 (B 10)	0.5 (W 12)	0.5 (B 41)	0.5 (W 43)	0.5 (B 45)	0.5 (W 44)	6	2712
29	(United States) Hans Niemann	2667	1 (W 113)	0 (B 10)	1 (W 75)	1 (W 42)	0.5 (B 39)	0 (B 1)	1 (W 76)	0.5 (B 23)	0.5 (W 24)	0 (W 7)	0.5 (B 36)	6	2702
30	(India) Aravindh Chithambaram	2649	1 (W 111)	0.5 (B 22)	0.5 (W 44)	0.5 (B 24)	0.5 (W 45)	0.5 (B 12)	0 (B 6)	1 (W 101)	0.5 (B 39)	0.5 (B 62)	0.5 (W 41)	6	2698
31	(Croatia) Ivan Šarić	2647	0 (W 10)	0.5 (B 113)	1 (W 78)	0.5 (B 81)	1 (W 27)	0 (B 26)	1 (W 104)	0.5 (B 12)	0.5 (W 41)	0.5 (B 49)	0.5 (W 45)	6	2694
32	(India) S. L. Narayanan	2651	1 (W 76)	0.5 (B 12)	0.5 (W 24)	0 (B 41)	1 (W 81)	0.5 (B 45)	0 (W 23)	0.5 (B 73)	1 (W 79)	0.5 (B 44)	0.5 (W 49)	6	2692
33	(Australia) Temur Kuybokarov	2584	1 (W 49)	0.5 (B 44)	0.5 (W 90)	0.5 (B 26)	0.5 (W 18)	0 (B 37)	0.5 (W 38)	0.5 (B 86)	1 (W 81)	0.5 (B 41)	0.5 (W 46)	6	2684
34	(Ukraine) Yuriy Kuzubov	2625	0 (B 6)	0.5 (W 107)	1 (B 91)	1 (W 65)	0.5 (B 20)	1 (W 50)	1 (W 43)	0.5 (B 4)	0.5 (W 22)	0 (B 9)	0 (W 12)	6	2676
35	(Armenia) Manuel Petrosyan	2604	0 (W 44)	0.5 (B 49)	1 (W 97)	0.5 (B 25)	0.5 (W 65)	0.5 (B 90)	1 (W 60)	0.5 (B 37)	1 (W 93)	0 (B 24)	0.5 (W 48)	6	2675
36	(Armenia) Shant Sargsyan	2631	0 (W 12)	0.5 (B 76)	1 (W 111)	0.5 (B 27)	0.5 (W 44)	0.5 (W 13)	0.5 (B 50)	1 (B 90)	0 (W 25)	1 (B 84)	0.5 (W 29)	6	2673
37	(Ukraine) Anton Korobov	2658	0.5 (B 80)	1 (W 91)	0.5 (B 6)	0.5 (W 20)	0.5 (B 7)	1 (W 33)	0 (B 5)	0.5 (W 35)	1 (B 53)	0.5 (W 13)	0 (B 11)	6	2672
38	(Azerbaijan) Rauf Mamedov	2640	0.5 (W 81)	0 (B 39)	0.5 (W 113)	0.5 (B 75)	0.5 (B 100)	1 (W 89)	0.5 (B 33)	1 (W 83)	0 (B 7)	0.5 (W 42)	1 (B 79)	6	2665
39	(France) Alireza Firouzja	2777	0.5 (B 54)	1 (W 38)	0.5 (W 69)	1 (B 90)	0.5 (W 29)	0.5 (B 43)	0.5 (W 21)	0 (B 22)	0.5 (W 30)	0.5 (B 46)	0.5 (W 14)	6	2662
40	(Spain) Alexei Shirov	2655	1 (W 110)	0.5 (B 41)	0.5 (W 12)	0 (B 1)	1 (W 113)	0.5 (W 42)	0 (B 15)	1 (B 56)	0.5 (W 16)	0 (B 43)	1 (W 69)	6	2660
41	(China) Yu Yangyi	2720	1 (B 105)	0.5 (W 40)	0.5 (B 17)	1 (W 32)	0.5 (B 8)	0.5 (W 4)	0 (B 18)	0.5 (W 28)	0.5 (B 31)	0.5 (W 33)	0.5 (B 30)	6	2658
42	(Romania) Richárd Rapport	2752	1 (W 16)	0.5 (B 18)	0.5 (W 48)	0 (B 29)	1 (W 88)	0.5 (B 40)	1 (W 46)	0 (B 21)	0 (W 15)	0.5 (B 38)	1 (W 68)	6	2655
43	(FIDE) Vladislav Artemiev	2697	0.5 (B 15)	0.5 (W 64)	1 (B 53)	1 (W 57)	0.5 (B 70)	0.5 (W 39)	0 (B 34)	0.5 (W 58)	0.5 (B 28)	1 (W 40)	0 (B 8)	6	2649
44	(Iran) Amin Tabatabaei	2685	1 (B 35)	0.5 (W 33)	0.5 (B 30)	0 (W 2)	0.5 (B 36)	0.5 (W 72)	0 (B 58)	1 (W 103)	1 (B 95)	0.5 (W 32)	0.5 (B 28)	6	2647
45	(India) Nihal Sarin	2694	0.5 (B 85)	0.5 (W 52)	0.5 (B 72)	1 (W 15)	0.5 (B 30)	0.5 (W 32)	0.5 (B 53)	1 (W 57)	0 (B 5)	0.5 (W 28)	0.5 (B 31)	6	2640
46	(Poland) Mateusz Bartel	2651	0.5 (B 91)	0.5 (W 80)	0.5 (B 89)	1 (W 77)	0.5 (B 11)	0.5 (W 6)	0 (B 42)	0.5 (W 52)	1 (B 72)	0.5 (W 39)	0.5 (B 33)	6	2640
47	(Spain) Alan Pichot	2631	0 (W 69)	1 (B 94)	0.5 (W 81)	0.5 (B 76)	0.5 (W 23)	0.5 (B 104)	1 (W 59)	0 (B 27)	0.5 (W 63)	0.5 (B 71)	1 (W 73)	6	2640
48	(Ukraine) Andrei Volokitin	2664	0.5 (B 77)	1 (W 112)	0.5 (B 42)	0 (W 5)	0 (B 57)	0.5 (W 94)	1 (B 87)	0.5 (W 72)	0.5 (B 52)	1 (W 70)	0.5 (B 35)	6	2626
49	(FIDE) Maxim Matlakov	2674	0 (B 33)	0.5 (W 35)	1 (B 85)	0.5 (W 52)	0.5 (B 72)	0 (W 15)	1 (B 94)	0.5 (W 70)	1 (B 57)	0.5 (W 31)	0.5 (B 32)	6	2617
50	(Germany) Matthias Blübaum	2668	0.5 (W 75)	0 (B 101)	1 (W 98)	0.5 (B 104)	1 (W 87)	0 (B 34)	0.5 (W 36)	0 (B 68)	0.5 (W 73)	0.5 (B 56)	1 (W 76)	6	2606
51	(Egypt) Bassem Amin	2680	1 (W 94)	0 (B 69)	0.5 (W 55)	0 (B 14)	0.5 (W 102)	0.5 (B 79)	0.5 (W 75)	0.5 (B 59)	0.5 (W 76)	1 (B 100)	1 (W 71)	6	2586
52	(Azerbaijan) Aydin Suleymanli	2588	0.5 (W 90)	0.5 (B 45)	0.5 (W 63)	0.5 (B 49)	0.5 (W 25)	1 (B 81)	0 (W 22)	0.5 (B 46)	0.5 (W 48)	0.5 (B 60)	0.5 (W 84)	5.5	2687
53	(Germany) Frederik Svane	2626	0 (B 4)	1 (W 67)	0 (W 43)	1 (B 84)	0.5 (W 90)	1 (B 63)	0.5 (W 45)	0.5 (B 25)	0 (W 37)	0.5 (B 65)	0.5 (W 60)	5.5	2682
54	(Ukraine) Ruslan Ponomariov	2641	0.5 (W 39)	0.5 (B 81)	0.5 (W 27)	0.5 (B 23)	0.5 (W 62)	0.5 (B 59)	0 (W 71)	0.5 (B 75)	1 (W 102)	0.5 (B 73)	0.5 (W 63)	5.5	2681
55	(Czech Republic) Thai Dai Van Nguyen	2618	0.5 (B 61)	0.5 (W 93)	0.5 (B 51)	1 (W 106)	0.5 (W 26)	0 (B 21)	0 (W 27)	0 (B 63)	0.5 (W 109)	1 (B 78)	1 (W 90)	5.5	2678
56	(FIDE) Volodar Murzin	2633	0.5 (B 5)	0.5 (W 13)	0 (B 11)	1 (W 107)	0.5 (B 93)	0.5 (W 83)	0.5 (B 62)	0 (W 40)	1 (B 89)	0.5 (W 50)	0.5 (B 61)	5.5	2676
57	(Germany) Niclas Huschenbeth	2605	1 (W 63)	0.5 (W 65)	0.5 (B 83)	0 (B 43)	1 (W 48)	0 (B 18)	1 (W 88)	0 (B 45)	0 (W 49)	0.5 (B 86)	1 (W 92)	5.5	2676
58	(Hungary) Benjamin Gledura	2633	0.5 (W 27)	0 (B 24)	0 (W 76)	0.5 (B 78)	1 (W 109)	1 (B 84)	1 (W 44)	0.5 (B 43)	0 (W 12)	0.5 (B 63)	0.5 (W 65)	5.5	2671
59	(United States) Abhimanyu Mishra	2592	0 (W 21)	0.5 (B 97)	0.5 (W 88)	0.5 (B 92)	1 (B 106)	0.5 (W 54)	0 (B 47)	0.5 (W 51)	0.5 (B 83)	1 (W 108)	0.5 (B 66)	5.5	2664
60	(India) Raunak Sadhwani	2641	0.5 (B 7)	0.5 (W 2)	0.5 (B 13)	0.5 (W 93)	0 (B 6)	1 (W 80)	0 (B 35)	0.5 (W 89)	1 (B 101)	0.5 (W 52)	0.5 (B 53)	5.5	2661
61	(United States) Sam Shankland	2698	0.5 (W 55)	1 (B 103)	0.5 (W 28)	0.5 (B 86)	1 (W 73)	0 (B 9)	0.5 (W 16)	0.5 (B 69)	0 (W 14)	0.5 (B 68)	0.5 (W 56)	5.5	2633
62	(India) Pentala Harikrishna	2716	0.5 (W 99)	0 (B 73)	0.5 (W 103)	1 (W 89)	0.5 (B 54)	0.5 (B 68)	0.5 (W 56)	0.5 (B 71)	1 W 86)	0.5 (B 30)	0 (W 16)	5.5	2629
63	(Czech Republic) David Navara	2689	0 (B 57)	1 (W 79)	0.5 (B 52)	0.5 (W 72)	0.5 (B 105)	0 (W 53)	0.5 (B 74)	1 (W 55)	0.5 (B 47)	0.5 (W 58)	0.5 (B 54)	5.5	2625
64	(India) Leon Luke Mendonca	2622	0.5 (W 84)	0.5 (B 43)	0 (W 26)	0 (B 88)	0.5 (W 78)	0.5 (B 110)	0.5 (W 91)	0.5 (B 109)	1 (W 111)	0.5 (B 90)	1 (W 93)	5.5	2625
65	(Armenia) Gabriel Sargissian	2686	1 (W 79)	0.5 (B 57)	0 (W 101)	0 (B 34)	0.5 (B 35)	0.5 (W 74)	1 (B 105)	0.5 (W 95)	0.5 (B 70)	0.5 (W 53)	0.5 (B 58)	5.5	2621
66	(Romania) Kirill Shevchenko	2671	0.5 (W 100)	0.5 (B 104)	0 (W 71)	0.5 (B 103)	0.5 (W 94)	0 (B 102)	0.5 (W 78)	1 (B 110)	1 (W 75)	0.5 (B 16)	0.5 (W 59)	5.5	2595
67	(Poland) Michał Krasenkow	2531	0 (W 25)	0 (B 53)	0.5 (W 94)	0.5 (B 79)	0 (W 97)	0 (B 109)	0.5 (B 111)	1 (W 114)	1 (W 99)	1 (B 102)	1 (W 86)	5.5	2585
68	(India) Aryan Chopra	2634	0.5 (B 13)	0.5 (W 5)	0 (B 2)	0.5 (W 74)	1 (B 77)	0.5 (W 62)	0.5 (B 83)	0.5 (W 50)	0.5 (B 84)	0.5 (W 61)	0 (B 42)	5	2708
69	(Kazakhstan) Ramazan Zhalmakhanov	2447	1 (B 47)	1 (W 51)	0.5 (B 39)	0.5 (B 21)	0.5 (W 22)	0.5 (W 7)	0 (B 26)	0.5 (W 61)	0 (B 11)	0.5 (W 82)	0 (B 40)	5	2706
70	(Netherlands) Erwin l'Ami	2627	1 (W 1)	1 (B 26)	0.5 (W 10)	0.5 (B 22)	0.5 (W 43)	0 (B 19)	0 (W 24)	0.5 (B 49)	0.5 (W 65)	0 (B 48)	0.5 (W 74)	5	2699
71	(Kazakhstan) Rinat Jumabayev	2585	1 (B 106)	0 (W 3)	1 (B 66)	1 (W 82)	0 (B 4)	0 (W 20)	1 (B 54)	0.5 (W 62)	0 (B 13)	0.5 (W 47)	0 (B 51)	5	2692
72	(Azerbaijan) Vasif Durarbayli	2625	0.5 (W 24)	0.5 (B 27)	0.5 (W 45)	0.5 (B 63)	0.5 (W 49)	0.5 (B 44)	0.5 (W 90)	0.5 (B 48)	0 (W 46)	0.5 (B 93)	0.5 (B 82)	5	2691
73	(Norway) Aryan Tari	2619	0.5 (B 20)	1 (W 62)	0.5 (B 82)	0.5 (W 83)	0 (B 61)	1 (W 93)	0 (B 17)	0.5 (W 32)	0.5 (B 50)	0.5 (W 54)	0 (B 47)	5	2682
74	(Greece) Nikolas Theodorou	2619	0 (W 22)	0.5 (B 111)	0.5 (W 84)	0.5 (B 68)	0.5 (W 75)	0.5 (B 65)	0.5 (W 63)	0.5 (B 81)	0.5 (B 82)	0.5 (W 83)	0.5 (B 70)	5	2676
75	(Uzbekistan) Shamsiddin Vokhidov	2578	0.5 (B 50)	0.5 (W 108)	0 (B 29)	0.5 (W 38)	0.5 (B 74)	0.5 (W 95)	0.5 (B 51)	0.5 (W 54)	0 (B 66)	1 (W 106)	0.5 (B 83)	5	2662
76	(Canada) Shawn Rodrigue-Lemieux	2488	0 (B 32)	0.5 (W 36)	1 (B 58)	0.5 (W 47)	1 (B 108)	0.5 (W 17)	0 (B 29)	0 (W 84)	0.5 (B 51)	1 (W 95)	0 (B 50)	5	2660
77	(Hungary) Ádám Kozák	2566	0.5 (W 48)	0.5 (B 19)	0.5 (W 25)	0 (B 46)	0 (W 68)	0.5 (B 99)	0 (W 84)	0.5 (B 98)	0 (W 113)	0.5 (B 97)	1 (W 103)	5	2647
78	(Romania) Mircea-Emilian Parligras	2561	0 (B 17)	0.5 (W 95)	0 (B 31)	0.5 (W 58)	0.5 (B 64)	0.5 (W 106)	0.5 (B 66)	1 (B 99)	0.5 (W 88)	0 (W 55)	1 (B 108)	5	2647
79	(Paraguay) Axel Bachmann	2604	0 (B 65)	0 (B 63)	0.5 (W 110)	0.5 (W 67)	1 (B 107)	0.5 (W 51)	0.5 (B 82)	1 (W 108)	0 (B 32)	1 (B 88)	0 (W 38)	5	2641
80	(FIDE) Denis Lazavik	2560	0.5 (W 37)	0.5 (B 46)	0 (W 19)	0.5 (B 97)	0.5 (W 92)	0 (B 60)	0.5 (W 99)	0.5 (B 94)	0.5 (W 98)	0.5 (B 103)	1 (W 104)	5	2635
81	(India) Gukesh D	2758	0.5 (B 38)	0.5 (W 54)	0.5 (B 47)	0.5 (W 31)	0 (B 32)	0 (W 52)	1 (B 113)	0.5 (W 74)	0 (B 33)	0.5 (W 87)	1 (W 100)	5	2618
82	(Armenia) Haik M. Martirosyan	2696	1 (W 14)	0.5 (B 28)	0.5 (W 73)	0 (B 71)	0 (W 16)	0.5 (B 103)	0.5 (W 79)	0.5 (B 102)	0.5 (W 74)	0.5 (B 69)	0.5 (W 72)	5	2618
83	(Sweden) Nils Grandelius	2689	0.5 (W 104)	1 (B 100)	0.5 (W 57)	0.5 (B 73)	0 (W 14)	0.5 (B 56)	0.5 (W 68)	0 (B 38)	0.5 (W 59)	0.5 (B 74)	0.5 (W 75)	5	2615
84	(Netherlands) Jorden van Foreest	2707	0.5 (B 64)	0 (W 15)	0.5 (B 74)	0 (W 53)	1 (B 112)	0 (W 58)	1 (B 77)	1 (B 76)	0.5 (W 68)	0 (W 36)	0.5 (B 52)	5	2611
85	(Spain) Eduardo Iturrizaga	2615	0.5 (W 45)	0 (B 90)	0 (W 49)	0 (B 110)	1 (W 114)	0 (B 96)	1 (W 112)	0.5 (B 97)	0.5 (W 92)	0.5 (B 94)	1 (W 107)	5	2603
86	(Armenia) Hrant Melkumyan	2650	1 (B 107)	0.5 (W 6)	0.5 (B 20)	0.5 (W 61)	0.5 (W 12)	0.5 (B 24)	0 (B 11)	0.5 (W 33)	0 (B 62)	0.5 (W 57)	0 (B 67)	4.5	2670
87	(Belgium) Daniel Dardha	2580	0 (W 18)	0.5 (B 16)	1 (W 99)	0.5 (W 108)	0 (B 50)	0.5 (B 97)	0 (W 48)	0.5 (B 92)	0.5 (W 104)	0.5 (B 81)	0.5 (W 88)	4.5	2661
88	(Germany) Rasmus Svane	2646	0.5 (B 2)	0 (W 7)	0.5 (B 59)	1 (W 64)	0 (B 42)	1 (W 113)	0 (B 57)	0.5 (W 100)	0.5 (B 78)	0 (W 79)	0.5 (B 87)	4.5	2645
89	(England) Shreyas Royal	2407	1 (W 97)	0 (B 21)	0.5 (W 46)	0 (B 62)	0.5 (W 103)	0 (B 38)	1 (W 98)	0.5 (B 60)	0 (W 56)	0.5 (B 104)	0.5 (W 94)	4.5	2643
90	(Azerbaijan) Nijat Abasov	2679	0.5 (B 52)	1 (W 85)	0.5 (B 33)	0 (W 39)	0.5 (B 53)	0.5 (W 35)	0.5 (B 72)	0 (W 36)	0.5 (B 100)	0.5 (W 64)	0 (B 55)	4.5	2629
91	(Turkey) Ediz Gürel	2514	0.5 (W 46)	0 (B 37)	0 (W 34)	0.5 (B 98)	0.5 (W 99)	0.5 (B 112)	0.5 (B 64)	0.5 (W 105)	0 (B 108)	1 (W 110)	0.5 (B 95)	4.5	2629
92	(Iran) Pouya Idani	2633	0 (B 11)	1 (W 96)	0 (B 5)	0.5 (W 59)	0.5 (B 80)	0 (B 27)	0.5 (W 109)	0.5 (W 87)	0.5 (B 85)	1 (W 101)	0 (B 57)	4.5	2623
93	(United States) Jeffery Xiong	2693	0.5 (W 103)	0.5 (B 55)	0.5 (W 14)	0.5 (B 60)	0.5 (W 56)	0 (B 73)	0.5 (W 100)	1 (B 104)	0 (B 35)	0.5 (W 72)	0.0 (B 64)	4.5	2620
94	(Germany) Dennis Wagner	2589	0 (B 51)	0 (W 47)	0.5 (B 67)	1 (W 111)	0.5 (B 66)	0.5 (B 48)	0 (W 49)	0.5 (W 80)	0.5 (B 106)	0.5 (W 85)	0.5 (B 89)	4.5	2613
95	(Netherlands) Max Warmerdam	2636	0 (W 23)	0.5 (B 78)	0.5 (W 109)	0 (B 113)	1 (W 98)	0.5 (B 75)	1 (W 96)	0.5 (B 65)	0 (W 44)	0 (B 76)	0.5 (W 91)	4.5	2602
96	(India) Adhiban Baskaran	2551	0 (W 9)	0 (B 92)	0.5 (W 114)	0 (B 102)	1 (B 111)	1 (W 85)	0 (B 95)	0.5 (W 106)	0 (B 105)	1 (W 109)	0.5 (W 97)	4.5	2594
97	(Spain) Jaime Santos Latasa	2650	0 (B 89)	0.5 (W 52)	0 (B 35)	0.5 (W 80)	1 (B 67)	0.5 (W 87)	0 (B 101)	0.5 (W 85)	0.5 (B 103)	0.5 (W 77)	0.5 (B 96)	4.5	2577
98	(Turkey) Vahap Şanal	2603	0 (B 3)	0.5 (W 106)	0 (B 50)	0.5 (W 91)	0 (B 95)	1 (W 107)	0 (B 89)	0.5 (W 77)	0.5 (B 80)	0.5 (W 111)	1 (B 109)	4.5	2570
99	(Chile) Cristobal Henriquez Villagra	2630	0.5 (B 62)	0 (W 20)	0 (B 87)	0.5 (W 112)	0.5 (B 91)	0.5 (W 77)	0.5 (B 80)	0 (W 78)	0 (B 67)	1 (W 114)	1 (B 111)	4.5	2561
100	(United States) Varuzhan Akobian	2582	0.5 (B 66)	0 (W 83)	0 (B 106)	1 (B 114)	0.5 (W 38)	0.5 (W 108)	0.5 (B 93)	0.5 (B 88)	0.5 (W 90)	0 (W 51)	0 (B 81)	4	2679
101	(France) Marc'Andria Maurizzi	2555	0.5 (B 8)	1 (W 50)	1 (B 65)	0 (W 3)	0 (W 19)	0 (B 25)	1 (W 97)	0 (B 30)	0 (W 60)	0 (B 92)	0.5 (B 110)	4	2659
102	(India) Abhijeet Gupta	2609	0 (W 26)	0 (B 1)	0.5 (B 107)	1 (W 96)	0.5 (B 51)	1 (W 66)	0 (B 13)	0.5 (W 82)	0 (B 54)	0 (W 67)	0.5 (B 106)	4	2659
103	(India) Karthikeyan Murali	2611	0.5 (B 93)	0 (W 61)	0.5 (B 62)	0.5 (W 66)	0.5 (B 89)	0.5 (W 82)	0.5 (B 108)	0 (B 44)	0.5 (W 97)	0.5 (W 80)	0 (B 70)	4	2659
104	(Argentina) Sandro Mareco	2606	0.5 (B 83)	0.5 (W 66)	0.5 (B 108)	0.5 (W 50)	0.5 (B 13)	0.5 (W 47)	0 (B 31)	0 (W 93)	0.5 (B 87)	0.5 (W 89)	0 (B 80)	4	2655
105	(Germany) Dmitrij Kollars	2633	0 (W 41)	1 (B 110)	0 (W 1)	1 (B 109)	0.5 (W 63)	0 (B 23)	0 (W 65)	0.5 (B 91)	1 (W 96)	0	0	4	2632
106	(Germany) Alexander Donchenko	2676	0 (W 71)	0.5 (B 98)	1 (W 100)	0 (B 55)	0 (W 59)	0.5 (B 78)	0.5 (W 110)	0.5 (B 96)	0.5 (W 94)	0 (B 75)	0.5 (W 102)	4	2587
107	(Israel) Alon Greenfeld	2543	0 (W 86)	0.5 (B 34)	0.5 (W 102)	0 (B 56)	0 (W 79)	0 (B 98)	1 (W 114)	0 (B 111)	1 (B 112)	1 (W 113)	0 (B 85)	4	2578
108	(Ukraine) Vasyl Ivanchuk	2653	0.5 (W 109)	0.5 (B 75)	0.5 (W 104)	0.5 (B 87)	0 (W 76)	0.5 (B 100)	0.5 (W 103)	0 (B 79)	1 (W 91)	0 (B 59)	0 (W 78)	4	2576
109	(Ukraine) Ihor Samunenkov	2531	0.5 (B 108)	0 (W 8)	0.5 (B 95)	0 (W 105)	0 (B 58)	1 (W 67)	0.5 (B 92)	0.5 (W 64)	0.5 (B 55)	0 (B 96)	0 (W 98)	3.5	2624
110	(Egypt) Adham Fawzy	2535	0 (B 40)	0 (W 105)	0.5 (B 79)	1 (W 85)	0 (B 15)	0.5 (W 64)	0.5 (B 106)	0 (W 66)	0.5 (B 114)	0 (B 91)	0.5 (W 101)	3.5	2616
111	(Isle of Man) Wu Li	2303	0 (B 30)	0.5 (W 74)	0 (B 36)	0 (B 94)	0 (W 96)	1 (B 114)	0.5 (W 67)	1 (W 107)	0 (B 64)	0.5 (B 98)	0 (W 99)	3.5	2588
112	(Brazil) Alexandr Fier	2574	0.5 (W 19)	0 (B 48)	0 (W 16)	0.5 (B 99)	0 (W 84)	0.5 (W 91)	0 (B 85)	0.5 (B 113)	0 (W 107)	1	0.5 (B 114)	3.5	2569
113	(Norway) Elham Amar	2568	0 (B 29)	0.5 (W 31)	0.5 (B 38)	1 (W 95)	0 (B 40)	0 (B 88)	0 (W 81)	0.5 (W 112)	0 (B 77)	0 (B 107)	0	2.5	2624
114	(Isle of Man) Dietmar Kolbus	2225	0 (W 28)	0 (B 14)	0.5 (B 96)	0 (W 100)	0 (B 85)	0 (W 111)	0 (B 107)	0 (B 67)	0.5 (W 110)	0 (B 99)	0.5 (W 112)	1.5	2574
