= Max Warmerdam =

Dutch chess grandmaster (born 2000)

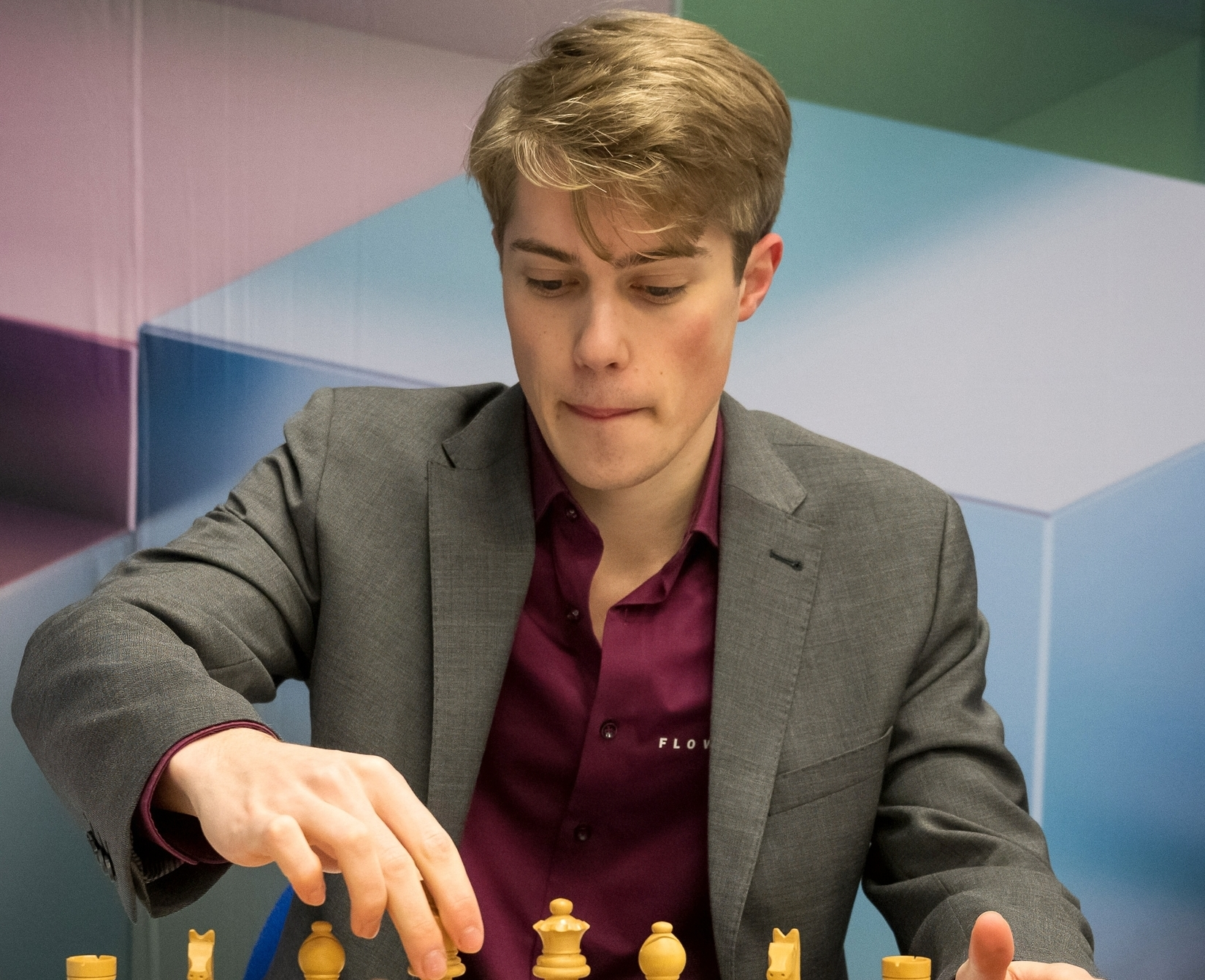
- Warmerdam at the Tata Steel Chess Tournament 2025

Personal information
- Born: 30 March 2000 (age 26) Tegelen, Netherlands

Chess career
- Country: Netherlands
- Title: Grandmaster (2021)
- FIDE rating: 2533 (July 2026)
- Peak rating: 2679 (September 2024)
- Peak ranking: No. 47 (September 2024)

Max Warmerdam (born 30 March 2000) is a Dutch chess grandmaster.

== Chess career ==
Warmerdam earned his FIDE master title in 2015, followed by the international master title in 2018. After qualifying through the "top nine-round event" at the 2019 Tata Steel Chess Tournament, Warmerdam was invited to compete at the Tata Steel Challengers in 2020. He placed 12th with 4½/13 (+2–6=5). During the tournament, he defeated the eventual winner, David Antón Guijarro, with the black pieces. As of 2020, Warmerdam is coached by Loek van Wely.

From 3 to 7 January 2021, Warmerdam participated in the Vergani Cup. He scored 7/9 to take first place, half-a-point clear of the rest of the field. In this process, he earned his third grandmaster norm. Later in January, he acted as second to Jorden van Foreest in the 83rd Tata Steel Masters. Van Foreest won the tournament and Warmerdam received praise for his work as second. When the interrupted Candidates Tournament resumed in April 2021, Warmerdam was a second to Anish Giri.

In July 2021 Warmerdam won the Ikaros tournament in Greece.

In August 2021 he won the Guimarães Open tournament in Portugal. Warmerdam finished clear first in the Guimarães Open with 8/9 (+7–0=2), half-a-point ahead of Hans Niemann, Guillaume Lamard, and Stamatis Kourkoulos Arditis.

In December 2021 he won the Dutch Chess Championship, finishing on 5/6 in the final four-player double round-robin.

In January 2025 he competed in the 87th edition of the Tata Steel Chess Tournament. He defeated Arjun Erigaisi in round 7, the first time he defeated a player rated above 2800.

== Personal life ==
Born in 2000, Warmerdam is from Tegelen in Limburg. He was a student of economics at Tilburg University from September 2020 to July 2025.
