= Corus Chess Tournament 2010 =

Chess tournament 2010

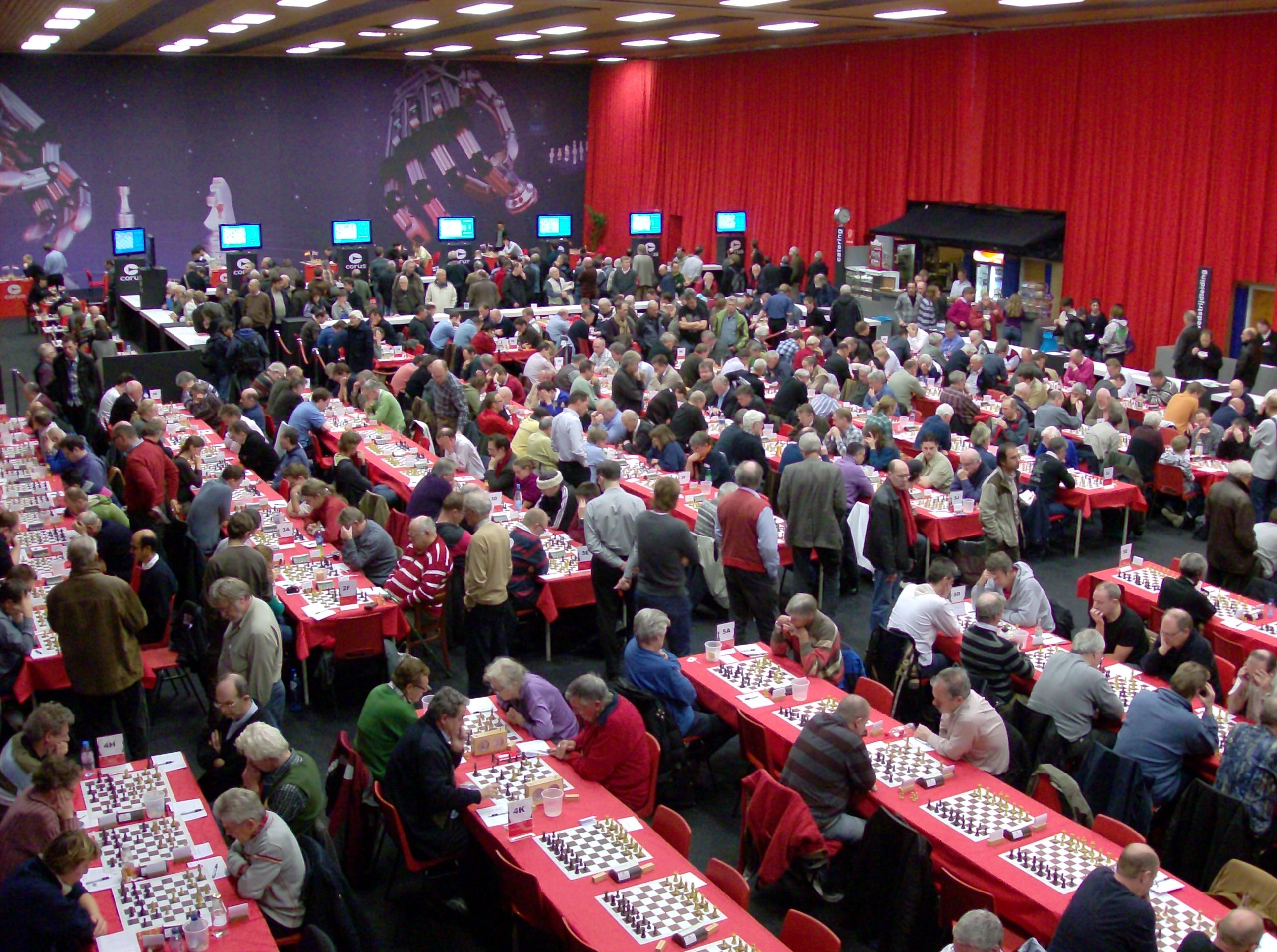
- Corus 2010
- Location: Wijk aan Zee, Netherlands
- Dates: 16–31 January 2010
- Competitors: 42
- Winning score: 8.5 points of 13

Champion
- (Norway) Magnus Carlsen

The Corus Chess Tournament 2010 was the 72nd edition of the Corus Chess Tournament. It was the final year under this name, as from 2011 the tournament was known as the Tata Steel Chess Tournament, after Tata Steel purchased the Corus Group. It was held in Wijk aan Zee from 16 to 31 January 2010.

The tournament was won by Magnus Carlsen, his second win the event. As of 2024, Carlsen holds the record for most wins in the event, with eight.

Fifteen-year old Anish Giri won the B section. Giri would go on to win the main event in 2023.

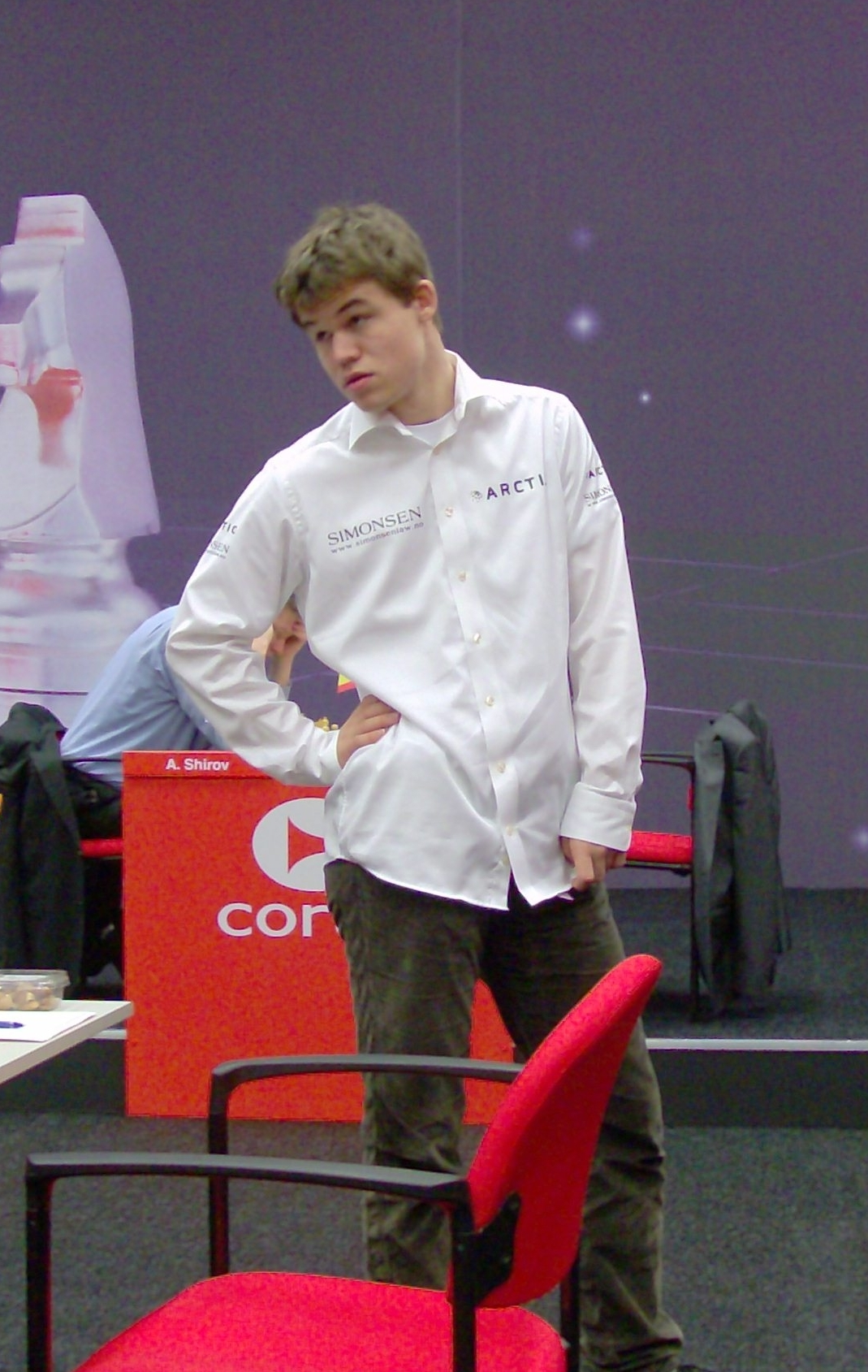
Magnus Carlsen, winner of Corus 2010

72nd Corus Chess Tournament, grandmaster group A, 16–31 January 2010, Wijk aan Zee, Cat. XIX (2719)
	Player	Rating	1	2	3	4	5	6	7	8	9	10	11	12	13	14	Total	SB	TPR
1	Magnus Carlsen (Norway)	2810		0	½	½	½	1	1	½	1	½	½	1	½	1	8½		2822
2	Vladimir Kramnik (Russia)	2788	1		½	0	1	½	½	½	½	½	½	1	½	1	8	50.50	2801
3	Alexei Shirov (Spain)	2723	½	½		0	0	½	½	1	½	1	½	1	1	1	8	47.00	2806
4	Viswanathan Anand (India)	2790	½	1	1		½	½	½	½	½	½	½	½	½	½	7½	49.75	2771
5	Hikaru Nakamura (United States)	2708	½	0	1	½		0	½	½	½	½	1	1	1	½	7½	45.50	2777
6	Sergey Karjakin (Russia)	2720	0	½	½	½	1		½	½	½	½	1	½	½	½	7	44.00	2748
7	Vasyl Ivanchuk (Ukraine)	2749	0	½	½	½	½	½		½	½	½	½	1	½	1	7	42.50	2746
8	Peter Leko (Hungary)	2739	½	½	0	½	½	½	½		½	1	½	0	½	1	6½	40.75	2718
9	Leinier Domínguez (Cuba)	2712	0	½	½	½	½	½	½	½		½	½	½	1	½	6½	40.25	2720
10	Fabiano Caruana (Italy)	2675	½	½	0	½	½	½	½	0	½		½	½	1	0	5½		2666
11	Nigel Short (England)	2696	½	½	½	½	0	0	½	½	½	½		0	½	½	5	33.25	2634
12	Loek van Wely (Netherlands)	2641	0	0	0	½	0	½	0	1	½	½	1		1	0	5	29.25	2638
13	Sergei Tiviakov (Netherlands)	2662	½	½	0	½	0	½	½	½	0	0	½	0		1	4½	29.25	2614
14	Jan Smeets (Netherlands)	2657	0	0	0	½	½	½	0	0	½	1	½	1	0		4½	27.25	2614

72nd Corus Chess Tournament, grandmaster group B, 16–31 January 2010, Wijk aan Zee, Cat. XVI (2629)
	Player	Rating	1	2	3	4	5	6	7	8	9	10	11	12	13	14	Total	SB	TPR
1	GM Anish Giri (Netherlands)	2588		½	½	½	1	1	½	1	1	0	1	½	1	½	9		2773
2	GM Arkadij Naiditsch (Germany)	2687	½		½	1	½	0	½	½	½	1	1	½	1	1	8½		2735
3	GM Ni Hua (China)	2657	½	½		½	½	½	½	0	1	1	½	½	1	1	8		2714
4	GM Erwin l'Ami (Netherlands)	2615	½	0	½		½	½	1	1	½	½	½	½	½	1	7½	46.00	2687
5	GM Wesley So (Philippines)	2656	0	½	½	½		½	½	½	½	½	1	1	1	½	7½	45.00	2684
6	GM Pentala Harikrishna (India)	2672	0	1	½	½	½		½	½	½	1	½	0	½	½	6½	42.25	2626
7	GM Parimarjan Negi (India)	2621	½	½	½	0	½	½		½	½	½	½	1	0	1	6½	40.75	2630
8	GM David Howell (England)	2606	0	½	1	0	½	½	½		0	½	½	1	1	0	6	38.00	2602
9	GM Emil Sutovsky (Israel)	2657	0	½	0	½	½	½	½	1		½	½	1	0	½	6	37.00	2598
10	IM Anna Muzychuk (Slovenia)	2523	1	0	0	½	½	0	½	½	½		½	½	½	½	5½	35.75	2580
11	GM Liviu-Dieter Nisipeanu (Romania)	2681	0	0	½	½	0	½	½	½	½	½		½	1	½	5½	32.75	2568
12	GM Dimitri Reinderman (Netherlands)	2573	½	½	½	½	0	1	0	0	0	½	½		0	1	5	33.00	2546
13	GM Tomi Nybäck (Finland)	2643	0	0	0	½	0	½	1	0	1	½	0	1		½	5	29.50	2541
14	GM Varuzhan Akobian (United States)	2628	½	0	0	0	½	½	0	1	½	½	½	0	½		4½		2519

72nd Corus Chess Tournament, grandmaster group C, 16–31 January 2010, Wijk aan Zee, Cat. IX (2455)
	Player	Rating	1	2	3	4	5	6	7	8	9	10	11	12	13	14	Total	SB	TPR
1	GM Li Chao (China)	2604		½	½	½	1	1	1	0	½	1	1	1	1	1	10		2655
2	GM Abhijeet Gupta (India)	2577	½		0	1	½	1	½	1	1	½	0	½	1	1	8½		2556
3	IM Robin van Kampen (Netherlands)	2456	½	1		0	1	1	½	0	1	0	½	½	1	1	8	49.25	2542
4	GM Daniele Vocaturo (Italy)	2495	½	0	1		½	1	0	1	0	1	0	1	1	1	8	47.25	2539
5	GM Robin Swinkels (Netherlands)	2495	0	½	0	½		0	1	1	½	1	½	½	1	1	7½	41.50	2509
6	GM Ray Robson (United States)	2570	0	0	0	0	1		1	½	1	½	1	1	½	1	7½	41.50	2503
7	FM Benjamin Bok (Netherlands)	2322	0	½	½	1	0	0		1	1	½	0	1	½	1	7		2494
8	IM Nils Grandelius (Sweden)	2515	1	0	1	0	0	½	0		0	1	1	½	1	0	6	38.75	2422
9	FM Stefan Kuipers (Netherlands)	2340	½	0	0	1	½	0	0	1		1	½	0	1	½	6	36.00	2435
10	IM Mariya Muzychuk (Ukraine)	2447	0	½	1	0	0	½	½	0	0		1	½	1	1	6	33.50	2427
11	GM Kjetil Aleksander Lie (Norway)	2547	0	1	½	1	½	0	1	0	½	0		0	½	½	5½		2391
12	GM Peng Zhaoqin (Netherlands)	2402	0	½	½	0	½	0	0	½	1	½	1		0	½	5		2372
13	Sjoerd Plukkel (Netherlands)	2279	0	0	0	0	0	½	½	0	0	0	½	1		½	3	16.50	2258
14	WGM Soumya Swaminathan (India)	2323	0	0	0	0	0	0	0	1	½	0	½	½	½		3	15.75	2254
