= Vidit Gujrathi =

Indian chess grandmaster (born 1994)

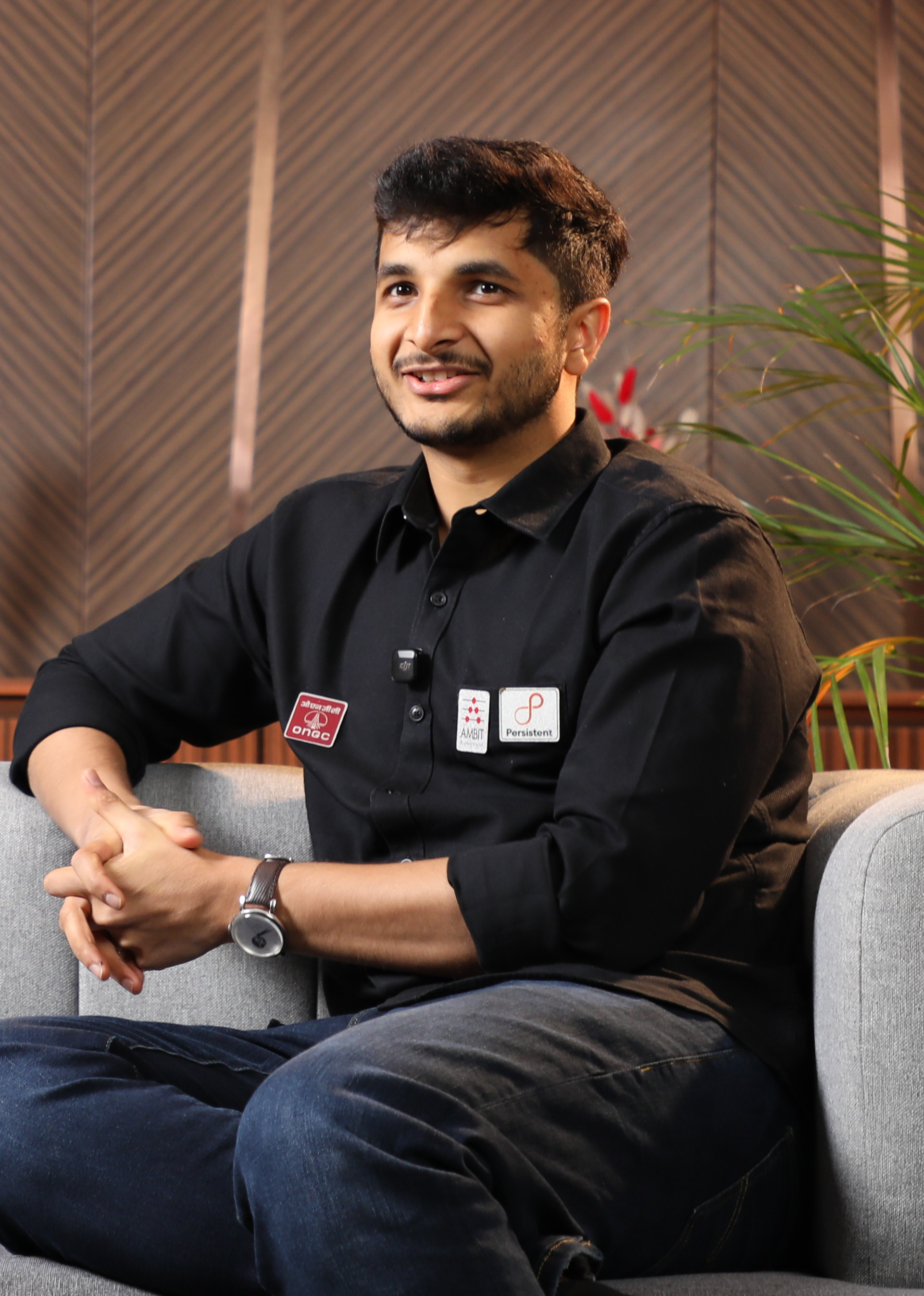
- Gujrathi in 2026

Personal information
- Born: Vidit Santosh Gujrathi; 24 October 1994 (age 32) Nashik, Maharashtra, India
- Spouse: Nidhi Kataria (m. 2025)

Chess career
- Country: India
- Title: Grandmaster (2013)
- FIDE rating: 2693 (November 2026)
- Peak rating: 2747 (February 2024)
- Ranking: No. 35 (November 2026)
- Peak ranking: No. 14 (January 2024)

Vidit Santosh Gujrathi (born 24 October 1994) is an Indian chess grandmaster. Gujrathi attained the title of grandmaster in January 2013, becoming the 30th player from India to do so. He is the fourth Indian player to have crossed the Elo rating of 2700. He is a double gold medalist at the Chess Olympiad. He is also a silver medalist at the Asian Games. Gujrathi won the Grand Swiss 2023 and became the third Indian to qualify for the Candidates tournament.

Gujrathi received the Arjuna Award 2025, India's second-highest sporting honour, from President of India Droupadi Murmu at Rashtrapati Bhavan on 13 November 2026, in recognition of his achievements in chess.

== Early life ==
Vidit Gujrathi was born in Nashik to Santosh Gujrathi, an Ayurveda practitioner, and Nikita Gujrathi, a cosmetologist. He did his early schooling at Fravashi Academy and was coached in chess from an early age.

== Career ==
=== 2006–2017 ===
In 2006, Gujrathi finished 2nd in the Asian Youth Championships in the U12 category, thus receiving the title of FIDE Master.

In 2008, he won the World Youth Chess Championship in the Open U14 section, the first Indian to do so. He scored 9 points out of a possible 11, clinching his final norm to become an International Master.

He finished 2nd in the U16 category of the World Youth Chess Championship in 2009, tying with the eventual winner S. P. Sethuraman at 9 points. He made the first step towards becoming a grandmaster in January 2010 by reaching a 2500 rating.

In the World Junior Chess Championship in Chennai in 2011, held for U20 players, Gujrathi finished with 8 points out of 11, thus gaining his first GM norm.

In the Nagpur International Open in 2011, Gujrathi finished with 8/11 points, one point behind the eventual winner Ziaur Rahman. He gained his second GM norm in the tournament. Gujrathi achieved his final GM norm at the age of 18 in the eighth round of the Rose Valley Kolkata Open Grandmasters' chess tournament in 2012, where he finished third.

In 2013, Gujrathi won a bronze medal in the World Junior Chess Championship in Turkey in the Junior (U20) category. Gujrathi finished third in the Hyderabad International Grandmasters chess tournament in 2013, winning Rs 150,000. He passed the 2600-rating threshold on the January 2014 rating list.

Gujrathi's equal third at the 2015 Asian Chess Championship qualified him to the Chess World Cup 2015, where he was eliminated in the first round. In 2017, he tied for the best score of 7/9 at the Dubai Open.

=== 2018–present ===
Gujrathi won the Challenger event of the 2018 Tata Steel Chess Tournament by a full point, going undefeated with a score of 9/13. He qualified for the Masters event of the 2019 tournament, where he had a respectable 7/13 showing, including a win over former world champion Vladimir Kramnik.

From 22–26 November 2019, he competed in the Tata Steel Rapid and Blitz as a wildcard competitor. He finished in a tie for eighth with fellow wildcard Pentala Harikrishna. He played in the Skilling Open, the first event of the Champions Chess Tour 2021.

He was the captain of the historic gold medal-winning Indian team in Online Chess Olympiad 2020.

Through February and March 2022, Gujrathi played in the FIDE Grand Prix 2022. In the first leg, he tied for second with Daniil Dubov with 3/6 in Pool C. In the second leg, he finished second in Pool C with a result of 3/6, finishing 12th in the standings with seven points.

Gujrathi qualified to the Chess World Cup 2023 by rating, replacing women's world chess champion Ju Wenjun. He reached the round of 16, where he defeated Ian Nepomniachtchi to advance to the quarterfinals for his second consecutive World Cup. He lost to Nijat Abasov in the quarterfinals, missing out on a chance to qualify for the Candidates Tournament.

He played in the FIDE Grand Swiss Tournament 2023 from 25 October to 5 November 2023. He lost in the first round, but won 7 out of his next 10 games to win the tournament with a score of 8½/11. Gujrathi qualified to the Candidates Tournament 2024 by finishing in the top two of the Grand Swiss. The All India Chess Federation announced a financial assistance of ₹20 million for candidates preparation to Gujrathi, R Praggnanandhaa and R Vaishali.

He finished sixth in the Candidates Tournament 2024, notably defeating Hikaru Nakamura in both of their games.

At the 45th Chess Olympiad in September 2024, Gujrathi was part of the Indian team that won gold medal in the open section in Budapest.

In March 2025, Gujrathi won the Paris Freestyle Chess Grand Slam Play-In and qualified for Paris Freestyle Chess Grand Slam.

== Notable results ==
- Individual silver and team gold medals in the European Chess Club Cup 2024.
- Part of gold medal-winning Indian team in the 45th Chess Olympiad.
- Winner of Gashimov Memorial 2023.
- Winner of the FIDE Grand Swiss Tournament 2023.
- Individual and team silver medals in the World Rapid Team Championship 2023.
- Quarter-finalist of the Chess World Cup 2023.
- Individual silver and team gold medals in the European Chess Club Cup 2022.
- Quarter-finalist of the Chess World Cup 2021.
- Captain of gold medal-winning Indian team in the Online Chess Olympiad 2020.
- Runner-up of the 2020 Prague Chess Festival Masters.
- Winner of the 2019 Biel Chess Festival.
- Quarter-finalist of the World Fischer Random Chess Championship 2019.
- Score of 7/11 in the FIDE Grand Swiss Tournament 2019.
- Winner of the 2018 Tata Steel Challengers.

== Personal life ==
On 2 April 2025, Vidit married Nidhi Kataria, a homeopath.
