= Wu Li (chess player) =

English chess player (born 1989)

Personal information
- Born: 1989 (age 36–37)

Chess career
- Country: England (until 2021); Isle of Man (since 2021)
- Title: FIDE Master (2024)
- Peak rating: 2345 (July 2011)

Wu Li (born 1989) is an English chess player who resides in and plays for the Isle of Man.

== Chess career ==
Wu moved to Coventry from China in 1999 and joined the Nuneaton Chess Club. He led the U12 World Youth Chess Championships at Oropesa del Mar in the early stages of the tournament.

In March 2009, Wu played for the University of Cambridge in the 127th Varsity Match between Oxford and Cambridge.

In October 2020, Wu achieved a convincing win in the Manx Chess Championship.

In December 2021, Wu defended his title in the Manx Chess Championship, winning ahead of Keith Allen.

Wu competed in the FIDE Grand Swiss Tournament 2023, where he defeated grandmaster Alon Greenfeld (rated over 200 points higher) in the eighth round.
