= Shreyas Royal =

English chess grandmaster (born 2009)

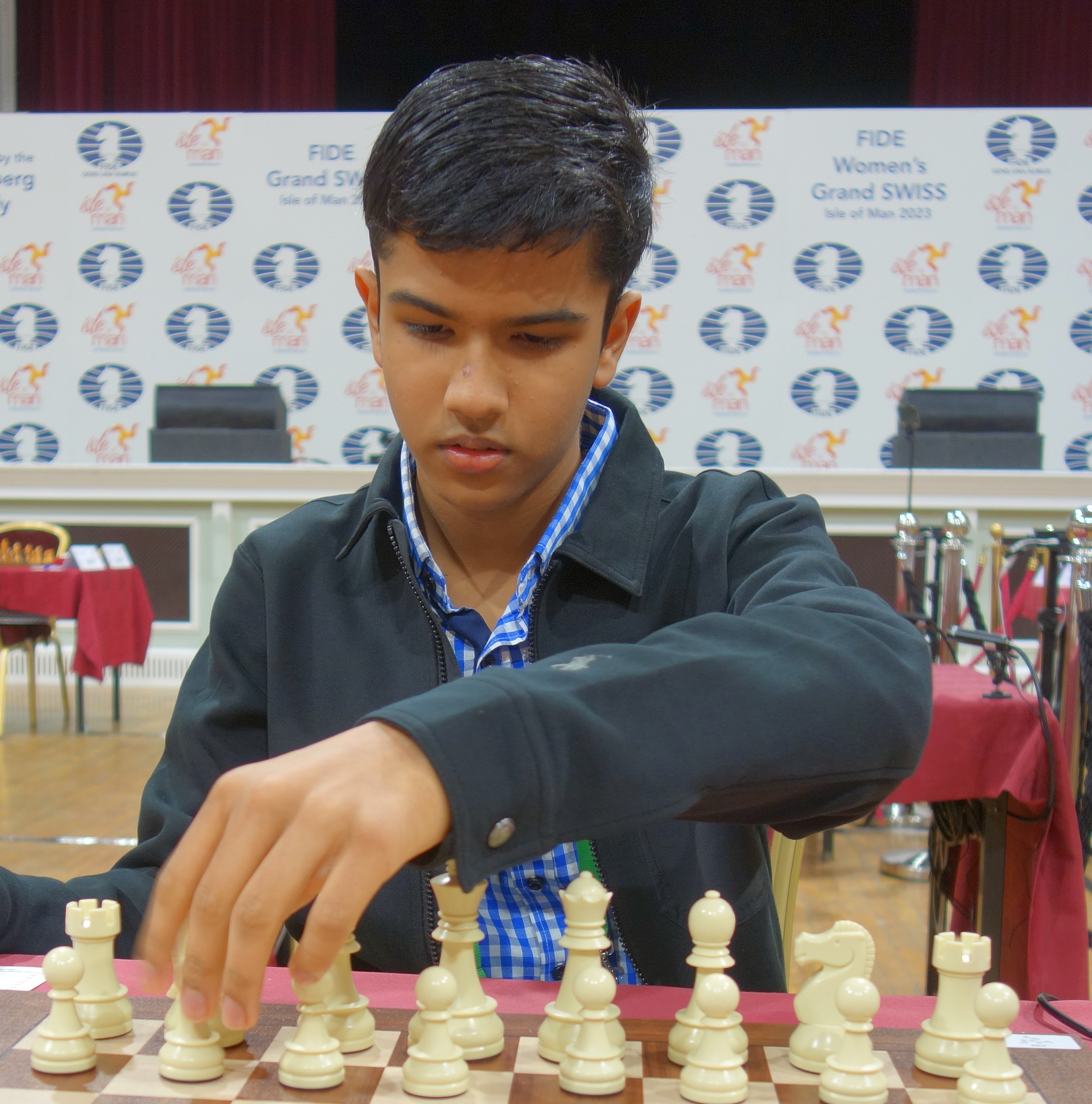
- Royal in 2023

Personal information
- Born: 9 January 2009 (age 17) Bengaluru, India

Chess career
- Country: England
- Title: Grandmaster (2024)
- FIDE rating: 2533 (October 2026)
- Peak rating: 2537 (November 2026)

Shreyas Royal (born 9 January 2009) is a British chess grandmaster. A chess prodigy, he became a grandmaster at the age of 15 years and 7 months, making him the youngest British player to achieve the title.

== Early life and education ==
Shreyas was born in Bangalore, India, and moved to Woolwich, South East London at the age of 3, when his father Jitendra Singh was offered a job as an IT project manager. Singh's visa was due to expire in September 2018, but he was granted a new work visa one month prior, allowing the family to stay and Royal to continue playing chess in England. On a scholarship, Royal attended the Pointer School in Blackheath.

== Career ==
He won the European Youth U8 Chess Championship in 2017.

In 2021 Royal became England's youngest International Master.

In November 2022, he scored his first GM norm at the Bavarian Open in Tegernsee, Germany. In doing so, he broke the record for being the youngest English player to earn a GM norm.

Royal competed in the FIDE Grand Swiss Tournament 2023. At the event, he won the first round against the higher-rated Jaime Santos Latasa, who was rated 2650 (whereas Royal was rated 2407). Shreyas also defeated Vahap Şanal in Round 7, rated 2603 at the time of the game. Royal finished with 4.5/11 points in the tournament, with a performance rating of 2574.

In December 2023, Royal played in the London Chess Classic, scoring 4/9 points and obtaining his second GM norm.

Royal achieved his third and final GM norm at the age of 15 in August 2024, after finishing in sixth place at the British Chess Championship. With this, Royal became the youngest British grandmaster in history, beating David Howell's record by 6 months.

In August 2026, he became the British Champion, becoming the youngest player to do it. Previously, Michael Adams had won the title in 1989 at the age of 17 years, 8 months, and 25 days. Shreyas won the tournament being 17 years and 7 months.
