= Pierre Bailet =

French chess grandmaster (born 1988)

Personal information
- Born: October 15, 1988 (age 37) Nice, France

Chess career
- Country: France
- Title: Grandmaster (2022)
- FIDE rating: 2410 (July 2026)
- Peak rating: 2536 (August 2017)

Pierre Bailet (born October 15, 1988) is a French chess grandmaster.

== Chess career ==
In December 2016, he achieved his first GM norm at the Open de Vandoeuvre. In May 2019, he achieved his second GM norm at the French Top 12 Team Championships.

In August 2022, he achieved his final GM norm by tying for first place with Sergey Fedorchuk and Guillaume Lamard at the Aix-en-Provence Open.

He plays for the Metz team and trains players in Brittany. He had previously played with the Échiquier Guingampais club from 2010 to 2014.
