= Julian Thew =

English poker player

- Nickname: Yo-Yo

World Series of Poker
- Bracelet: None
- Money finishes: 3

European Poker Tour
- Title: 1
- Final tables: 6
- Money finishes: 13

Julian "Yoyo" Thew is an English professional poker player based in Nottingham, Nottinghamshire.

Thew received his nickname when fellow players told him that his chipstack goes up and down like a yo-yo. Thew has made ten finishes in the money on the European Poker Tour (EPT) to date, including two final tables during its first season, and winning the Baden bei Wien event in season four which paid him € 670,800.

He has also won three £1,000 GUKPT titles, the 2008 $5000 Venetian Deepstack Main Event & the 2011 £1000 Monte Carlo event at Dusk Till Dawn, Nottingham.

On Sunday 16 October 2011 he won his third GUKPT title at the G Casino in Coventry, winning £42,740 and becoming the first player to win three GUKPT titles. Fittingly, it was also his birthday.

As of 2011, his total live tournament winnings exceed $2,600,000. He is sponsored by Sky Poker.
