= European Poker Tour season 1 results =

EPT Season 1
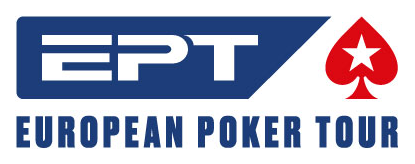
- League: European Poker Tour
- Sport: Poker
- Duration: September 14, 2004 – March 19, 2005
- Total attendance: 1,476 (Main Event only)

Statistics
- Countries: Spain - Barcelona; United Kingdom - London; Ireland - Dublin; Denmark - Copenhague; France - Deauville; Austria - Vienna; Monaco - Monte Carlo
- Top Season 1 Money List: (Netherlands) Rob Hollink ($845,190)

EPT seasons
- Season 2 →

Below are the results of the first season of the European Poker Tour (EPT). All currency amounts are in "€" Euro, U$ Dollar (and local currency when apply).

== Results ==
=== (Spain) EPT Barcelona Open ===
- Casino: Casino Barcelona. Barcelona, Spain
- Buy-in: €1,000 (~$1,225)
- 6-Day Event: Tuesday, September 14, 2004 to Sunday, September 19, 2004
- 2-Day Main Event: Saturday, September 18, 2004 to Sunday, September 19, 2004
- Number of buy-ins: 229
- Total Prize Pool: €229,000 (~$280,524)
- Number of Payouts: 27
- Winning Hand: K♠ Q♣
- Board: 5♣ Q♥ 2♥ Q♦ 10♠
- Losing Hand: Q♠ J♣
- Official Results: The Hendom Mob

Final Table
Place	Name	Original Prize	Prize (U$D)
1st	(Sweden) Alexander Stevic	€80,000	$98,000
2nd	(Republic of Ireland) David O'Callaghan	€41,000	$50,225
3rd	(Italy) Luca Pagano	€20,000	$24,500
4th	(Poland) Adam Robak	€12,600	$15,435
5th	(England) Garry Bush	€8,500	$10,412
6th	(Austria) Stefan Rapp	€7,500	$9,187
7th	(England) John Kabbaj	€6,400	$7,840
8th	(Greece) Andreas Pournaras	€5,300	$6,492

=== (United Kingdom) EPT London European Poker Classics ===
- Casino: The Poker Room formerly The Vic, London, United Kingdom
- Buy-in: £3,000 (~€4,369) (~$5,392)
- 7-Day Event: Monday, October 4, 2004 to Sunday, October 10, 2004
- 2-Day Main Event: Saturday, October 9, 2004 to Sunday, October 10, 2004
- Number of buy-ins: 175
- Total Prize Pool: £539,410 (~€785,585) (~$969,500)
- Number of Payouts: 18
- Winning Hand: K♠ Q♠
- Board: 9♠ 10♠ Q♥ 6♠ 5♦
- Losing Hand: J♠ J♣
- Official Results: The Hendom Mob
- Video: YouTube: EPT Season 1 The Winner London Classic John Shipley (26m27s)

Final Table
Place	Name	Original Prize	Prize (€uro)	Prize (U$D)
1st	(England) John Shipley	£200,000	€291,276	$359,479
2nd	(England) John Falconer	£117,000	€170,396	$210,295
3rd	(England) Robert Cooper	£58,000	€84,470	$104,249
4th	(Norway) Baard Dahl	£33,600	€48,934	$60,393
5th	(England) Jeffrey Duvall	£19,600	€28,545	$35,229
6th	(Netherlands) Noah Boeken	£16,800	€24,467	$30,196
7th	(Netherlands) Marcel Luske	£14,800	€21,554	$26,601
8th	(Republic of Ireland) George McKeever	£11,210	€16,326	$20,149

=== (Republic of Ireland) EPT Dublin The Irish Winter Tournament 2004 ===
- Casino: Merrion Casino Club, Dublin, Ireland
- Buy-in: €1,500+100 (~$2,013)
- 4-Day Event: Thursday, October 21, 2004 to Sunday, October 24, 2004
- 2-Day Main Event: Saturday, October 23, 2004 to Sunday, October 24, 2004
- Number of buy-ins: 163
- Total Prize Pool: €244,500 (~$307,605)
- Number of Payouts: 18
- Winning Hand: A♣ 5♠
- Board: 7♥ A♦ 3♣ 7♠ Q♦
- Losing Hand: 4♥ 4♣
- Official Results: The Hendom Mob
- Video: YouTube: EPT Dublin Season 1 (The Irish Winter Tournament 2004) - Final table (51m14s)

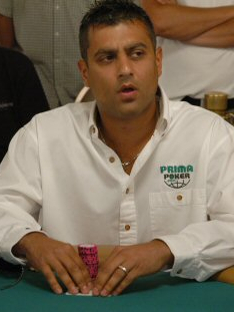
Ram Vaswani

Final Table
Place	Name	Original Prize	Prize (U$D)
1st	(England) Ram Vaswani	€93,000	$117,003
2nd	(Republic of Ireland) Rory Liffey	€46,000	$57,873
3rd	(Republic of Ireland) Jamie Drummond	€23,000	$28,936
4th	(England) Alan Vinson	€14,750	$18,557
5th	(England) Sean Donaldson	€9,800	$12,329
6th	(England) Xuyen Pham	€8,500	$10,694
7th	(England) Julian Thew	€6,200	$7,800
8th	(Republic of Ireland) John Coughlan	€5,000	$6,290

=== (Denmark) EPT Copenhagen Scandinavian Open ===
- Casino: Casino Copenhagen, Copenhagen, Denmark
- Buy-in: DKr.19,300+700 (~€2,689) (~$3,484)
- 6-Day Event: Tuesday, January 25, 2005 to Sunday, January 30, 2005
- 3-Day Main Event: Friday, January 28, 2005 to Sunday, January 30, 2005
- Number of buy-ins: 156
- Total Prize Pool: DKr.2,883,825 (~€387,749) (~$502,426)
- Number of Payouts: 18
- Winning Hand: A♣ Q♥
- Board: J♦ 10♠ 3♣ K♣ 5♥
- Losing Hand: A♦ J♣
- Official Results: The Hendom Mob
- Video: Dailymotion: Noah Boeken Exclusive - EPT 1 - Noah Boeken wins EPT 1 Copenhageni PokerStars.com (2m07s)

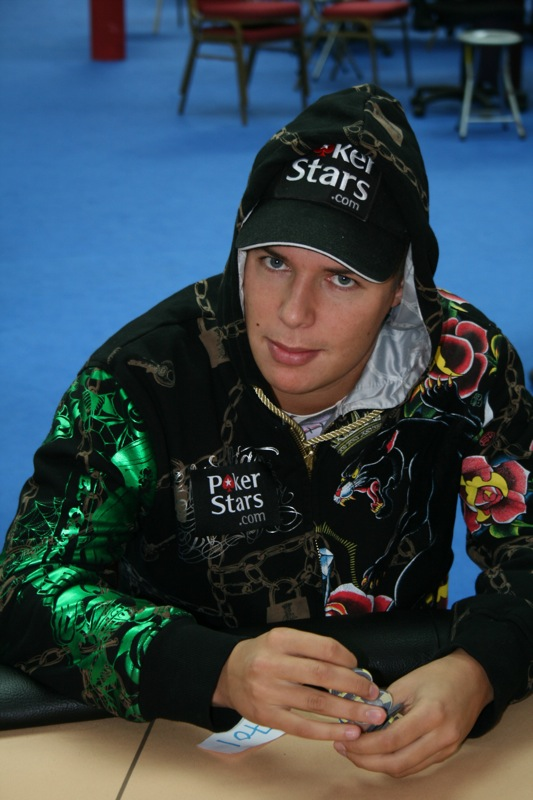
Noah Boeken

Final Table
Place	Name	Original Prize	Prize (€uro)	Prize (U$D)
1st	(Netherlands) Noah Boeken	DKr.1,098,340	€147,679	$191,355
2nd	(England) Ram Vaswani	DKr.549,170	€73,839	$95,678
3rd	(Cyprus) Charalambos Xanthos	DKr.271,695	€36,531	$47,335
4th	(England) Julian Thew	DKr.173,442	€23,320	$30,217
5th	(Norway) Eirik Kolaas	DKr.115,615	€15,545	$20,143
6th	(Sweden) Michael Westerlund	DKr.101,163	€13,602	$17,625
7th	(Denmark) Dan Pedersen	DKr.86,711	€11,659	$15,107
8th	(Norway) Alexander Cooper	DKr.72,259	€9,716	$12,589

=== (France) EPT Deauville French Open ===
- Casino: Casino Barrière de Deauville, Deauville, France
- Buy-in: €2,000 (~$2,592)
- 6-Day Event: Monday, February 14, 2005 to Saturday, February 19, 2005
- 4-Day Main Event: Wednesday, February 16, 2005 to Saturday, February 19, 2005
- Number of buy-ins: 245
- Total Prize Pool: €465,500 (~$603,151)
- Number of Payouts: 27
- Winning Hand: 10♦ 7♦
- Board: 3♠ 7♥ 6♥ 9♠ 6♣
- Losing Hand: 4♥ 3♥
- Official Results: The Hendom Mob
- Video: Dailymotion: EPT S01 Deauville 2005 Final Table Part 1 (15m33s) · Part 2 (15m38s) · Part 3 (15m35s) · Part 4 (15m35s) · Part 5 (15m35s)

Final Table
Place	Name	Original Prize	Prize (U$D)
1st	(United States) Brandon Schaefer	€144,000	$186,582
2nd	(United States) Carl Olson	€80,000	$103,656
3rd	(United States) Mark Ristine	€40,500	$52,476
4th	(United States) Justin Bonomo	€31,500	$40,815
5th	(England) Jeremy Tuckmann	€27,000	$34,984
6th	(England) Bob Coombes	€22,500	$29,153
7th	(Sweden) Peter Eichhardt	€18,000	$23,323
8th	(Italy) Luca Pagano	€13,500	$17,492

=== (Austria) EPT Vienna 11th Vienna Spring Poker Festival ===
- Casino: Concord Card Casino, Vienna Simmering, Vienna, Austria
- Buy-in: €2,100 (~$2,781)
- 13-Day Event: Monday, February 28, 2005 to Saturday, March 12, 2005
- 4-Day Main Event: Wednesday, March 9, 2005 to Saturday, March 12, 2005
- Number of buy-ins: 297
- Total Prize Pool: €594,000 (~$786,515)
- Number of Payouts: 27
- Winning Hand: A♠ J♠
- Board: Q♣ Q♠ 6♣ 7♥ 4♥
- Losing Hand: K♦ J♦
- Official Results: The Hendom Mob
- Video: YouTube: EPT Vienna Season 1 (11th Vienna Spring Poker Festival) - Final table (51m56s)

Final Table
Place	Name	Original Prize	Prize (U$D)
1st	(France) Pascal Perrault	€184,500	$244,296
2nd	(Sweden) Andreas Harnemo	€101,400	$134,264
3rd	(Finland) Mika Puro	€51,800	$68,588
4th	(Austria) Joachim Sanejstra	€40,500	$53,626
5th	(United States) Tim Ramsey	€34,500	$45,681
6th	(England) Dave Clayton	€28,800	$38,134
7th	(United States) Joshua Schiffman	€23,000	$30,454
8th	(England) Simon Nowab	€17,300	$22,907

=== (Monaco) EPT Monte Carlo Grand Final ===
- Casino: Monte-Carlo Bay Hotel & Resort, Monte Carlo, Monaco
- Buy-in: €10,000 (€9,600+€400) (~$13,310)
- 6-Day Event: Monday, March 14, 2005 to Saturday, March 19, 2005
- 6-Day Main Event: Monday, March 14, 2005 to Saturday, March 19, 2005
- Number of buy-ins: 211
- Total Prize Pool: €1,983,400 (~$2,639,913)
- Number of Payouts: 27
- Winning Hand: J♠ 8♠
- Board: K♣ 9♦ 5♥ 8♣ J♣
- Losing Hand: K♦ 7♠
- Official Results: The Hendom Mob
- Video: YouTube: EPT Monte Carlo Season 1 (European Poker Tour Grand Final) - Final table (51m53s)

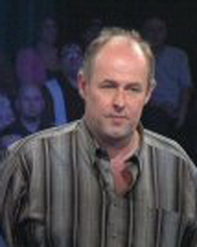
Rob Hollink

Final Table
Place	Name	Original Prize	Prize (U$D)
1st	(Netherlands) Rob Hollink	€635,000	$845,190
2nd	(United States) Brandon Schaefer	€350,000	$465,852
3rd	(Sweden) Alexander Stevic	€178,000	$236,919
4th	(Spain) Romain Feriolo	€139,000	$185,010
5th	(United States) Kevin Seeger	€118,000	$157,059
6th	(Canada) Abdulaziz Abdulaziz	€99,500	$132,435
7th	(England) Ben Grundy	€79,500	$105,815
8th	(Russia) Mikhail Ustinov	€59,500	$79,195
