= Stefan Kuipers =

Dutch chess player (born 1990)

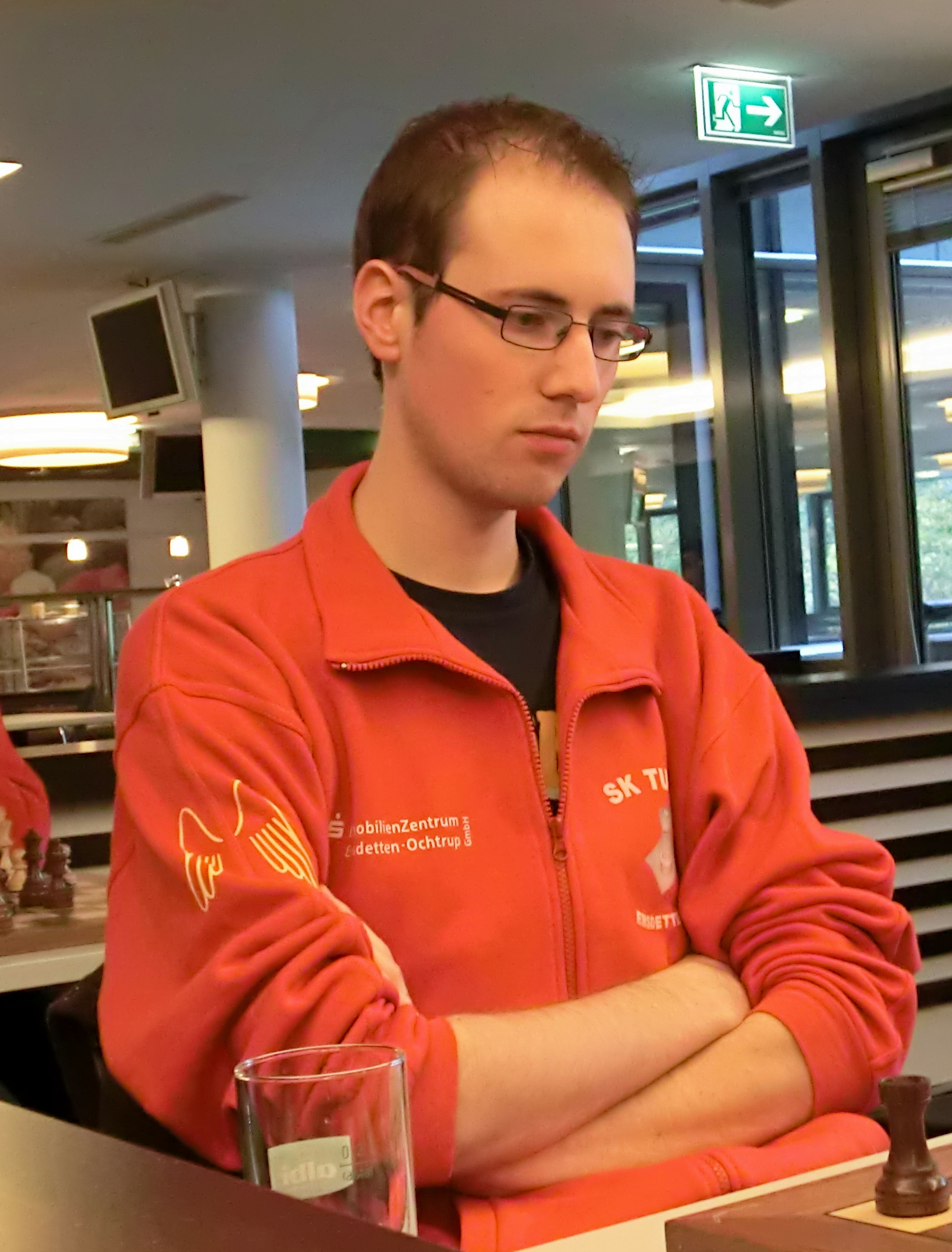
- Kuipers in 2012

Personal information
- Born: February 2, 1990 (age 36) Apeldoorn, Netherlands

Chess career
- Country: Netherlands
- Title: International Master (2012)
- FIDE rating: 2457 (October 2026)
- Peak rating: 2484 (July 2018)

Stefan Kuipers (born February 2, 1990) is a Dutch chess player.

== Chess career ==
In 2010, Kuipers played in Group C of the Tata Steel Chess Tournament, where he defeated a few higher-rated players: Daniele Vocaturo, Nils Grandelius, and Mariya Muzychuk.

In 2019, Kuipers played in the Challengers section of the Tata Steel Chess Tournament, where he was the lowest-seeded player. He got his only win against Lucas van Foreest, but held draws against Andrey Esipenko, Benjámin Gledura, Dinara Saduakassova, and Elisabeth Pähtz.

Kuipers provided commentary for the 2020 Dutch Youth Chess Championship and the 2023 World Youth Chess Olympiad.
