= Guillaume Lamard =

French chess grandmaster (born 1997)

Personal information
- Born: May 2, 1997 (age 29) Cannes, France

Chess career
- Country: France
- Title: Grandmaster (2024)
- FIDE rating: 2483 (July 2026)
- Peak rating: 2529 (March 2023)

Guillaume Lamard is a French chess grandmaster.

== Chess career ==
In July 2019, he finished second at the Condom Chess Festival, also earning his second IM norm.

In December 2019, he won the Lyon International Tournament.

In August 2022, he tied for first place with Sergey Fedorchuk and Pierre Bailet at the Aix-en-Provence Open. He won the tournament on tiebreak scores, also earning his first GM norm.

In July 2024, he earned his final GM norm at the Aix-en-Provence Open, also achieving the Grandmaster title.
