= Tata Steel Chess Tournament 2019 =

Chess tournament 2019

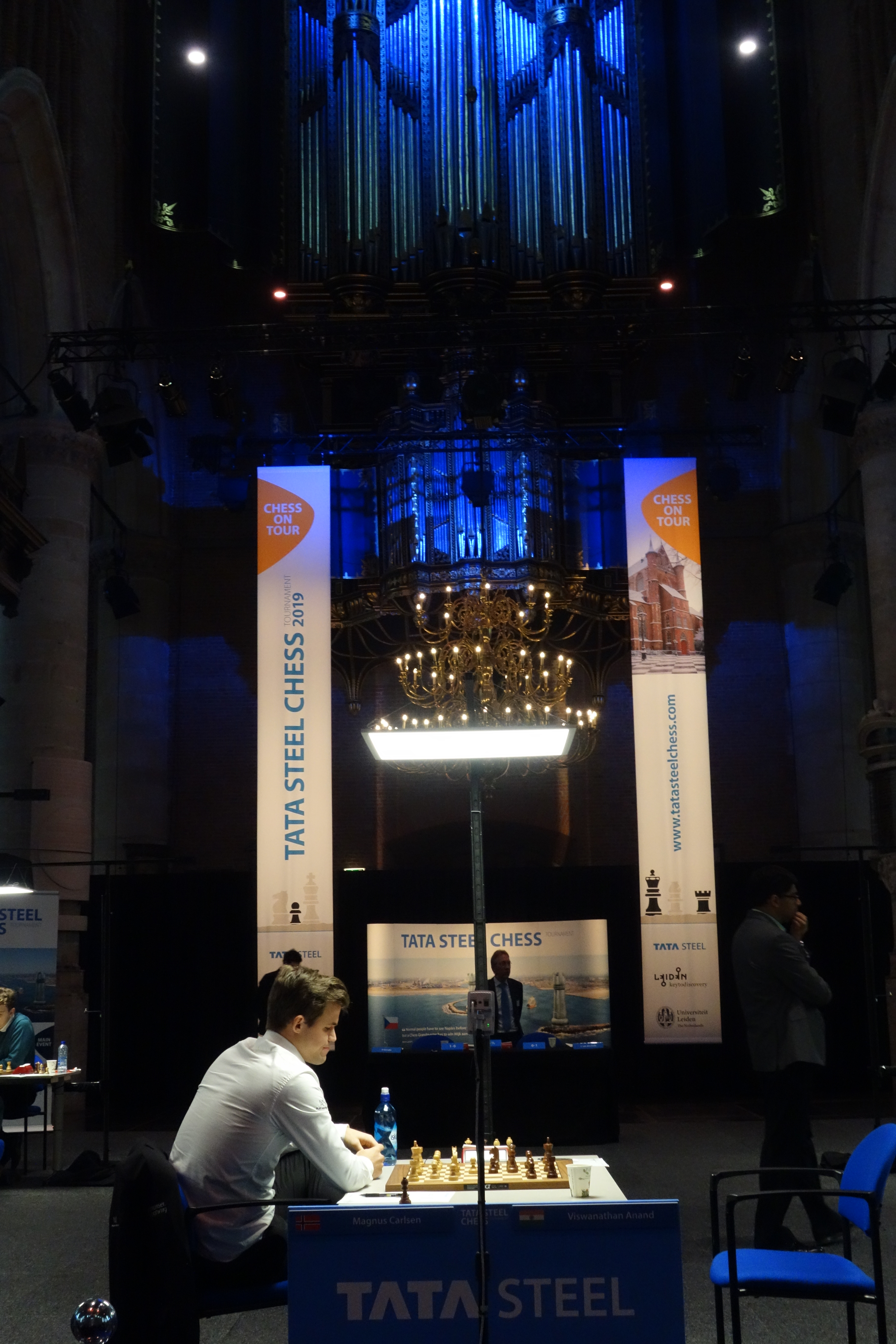
- Carlsen (2019)
- Location: Wijk aan Zee, Netherlands
- Dates: 11–27 January 2019
- Competitors: 28 from 15 nations
- Winning score: 9 points of 13

Champion
- (Norway) Magnus Carlsen (Masters) (Belarus) Vladislav Kovalev (Challengers)

The Tata Steel Chess Tournament 2019 was the 81st edition of the Tata Steel Chess Tournament. It was held in Wijk aan Zee, Alkmaar and Leiden from 11–27 January 2019. The tournament was won by Magnus Carlsen. This tournament marked the final classical tournament for former World Champion Vladimir Kramnik.

81st Tata Steel Masters, 12–27 January 2019, Wijk aan Zee — Alkmaar — Leiden, Netherlands, Category XXI (2753)
	Player	Rating	1	2	3	4	5	6	7	8	9	10	11	12	13	14	Total	SB	TPR
1	Magnus Carlsen (Norway)	2835		½	½	½	1	½	½	½	1	1	½	1	1	½	9		2888
2	Anish Giri (Netherlands)	2783	½		0	½	½	½	½	1	1	1	1	½	½	1	8½		2861
3	Ian Nepomniachtchi (Russia)	2763	½	1		½	½	1	½	0	½	½	1	½	0	1	7½	48.75	2809
4	Ding Liren (China)	2813	½	½	½		½	½	½	1	½	½	½	½	1	½	7½	47.25	2805
5	Viswanathan Anand (India)	2773	0	½	½	½		½	½	½	½	½	½	1	1	1	7½	44.25	2809
6	Vidit Gujrathi (India)	2695	½	½	0	½	½		0	½	½	½	½	1	1	1	7		2787
7	Teimour Radjabov (Azerbaijan)	2757	½	½	½	½	½	1		½	½	½	0	½	½	½	6½	43.25	2753
8	Sam Shankland (United States)	2725	½	0	1	0	½	½	½		½	½	0	½	1	1	6½	40.00	2755
9	Richárd Rapport (Hungary)	2725	0	0	½	½	½	½	½	½		1	½	½	1	½	6½	38.50	2755
10	Jan-Krzysztof Duda (Poland)	2738	0	0	½	½	½	½	½	½	0		1	½	0	1	5½		2697
11	Vladimir Fedoseev (Russia)	2724	½	0	0	½	½	½	1	1	½	0		½	0	0	5	34.25	2668
12	Shakhriyar Mamedyarov (Azerbaijan)	2817	0	½	½	½	0	0	½	½	½	½	½		½	½	5	31.25	2661
13	Jorden van Foreest (Netherlands)	2612	0	½	1	0	0	0	½	0	0	1	1	½		0	4½	28.00	2654
14	Vladimir Kramnik (Russia)	2777	½	0	0	½	0	0	½	0	½	0	1	½	1		4½	26.75	2641

2019 Tata Steel Challengers, 12–27 January 2019, Wijk aan Zee, Netherlands, Category XIV (2580)
	Player	Rating	1	2	3	4	5	6	7	8	9	10	11	12	13	14	Total	SB	TPR
1	GM Vladislav Kovalev (Belarus)	2687		½	1	½	½	½	½	1	1	1	½	1	1	1	10		2783
2	GM Andrey Esipenko (Russia)	2584	½		½	½	1	½	0	½	1	1	1	1	½	½	8½	51.50	2690
3	GM Benjámin Gledura (Hungary)	2615	0	½		1	½	1	½	½	½	1	1	½	1	½	8½	51.25	2687
4	GM Maksim Chigaev (Russia)	2604	½	½	0		½	½	½	1	½	½	1	1	1	1	8½	48.00	2688
5	GM Anton Korobov (Ukraine)	2699	½	0	½	½		½	½	1	½	1	½	½	½	1	7½	45.25	2628
6	GM Erwin l'Ami (Netherlands)	2643	½	½	0	½	½		1	½	½	½	½	½	1	1	7½	44.25	2632
7	GM Evgeny Bareev (Canada)	2650	½	1	½	½	½	0		0	0	½	1	1	½	1	7	41.75	2604
8	GM Parham Maghsoodloo (Iran)	2679	0	½	½	0	0	½	1		½	½	½	1	1	1	7	37.50	2601
9	GM Lucas van Foreest (Netherlands)	2502	0	0	½	½	½	½	1	½		½	½	½	1	0	6		2557
10	IM Vincent Keymer (Germany)	2500	0	0	0	½	0	½	½	½	½		½	1	½	1	5½		2529
11	GM R Praggnanandhaa (India)	2539	½	0	0	0	½	½	0	½	½	½		½	½	1	5		2496
12	IM Dinara Saduakassova (Kazakhstan)	2472	0	0	½	0	½	½	0	0	½	0	½		½	½	3½	20.50	2413
13	IM Elisabeth Pähtz (Germany)	2477	0	½	0	0	½	0	½	0	0	½	½	½		½	3½	20.00	2413
14	IM Stefan Kuipers (Netherlands)	2470	0	½	½	0	0	0	0	0	1	0	0	½	½		3		2378
