= Prithu Gupta =

Indian chess grandmaster (born 2004)

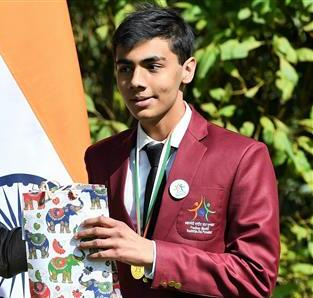
- Gupta in 2020

Personal information
- Born: 8 March 2004 (age 22) Gurgaon, India

Chess career
- Country: India
- Title: Grandmaster (2019)
- Peak rating: 2493 (August 2019)

Prithu Gupta is an Indian chess grandmaster from Gurgaon, Haryana. He reached this milestone in July 2019, at the age of 15 years and 4 months, 31 years after Viswanathan Anand became India's first GM. He began playing chess when he was nine years old, which is relatively late compared to most other grandmasters.

== Career ==
Beginning with an Elo rating of 1187 in October 2013, Prithu went past 2500 in less than six years of competition despite playing in a lesser number of tournaments, focusing instead on the top-ranking events, which featured the best players.

Prithu achieved his maiden International Master (IM) norm at the Silver Lake Open in Silver Lake, Veliko Gradište, Serbia, in July 2017, and his second IM norm came a month later at the Golden Prague Chess Festival in the Czech Republic, where he won seven out of his nine matches in the round-robin event, finishing top and crossing 2300 Elo rating points in the process.

In January 2018 at the Tradewise Gibraltar Masters, Prithu won the title of International Master and achieved his first Grandmaster (GM) norm. Then, following a tied-4th finish at the 7th Llucmajor Open in Palma da Mallorca, Prithu obtained his second GM norm at the Biel International Chess Festival in Switzerland, in July 2018.

Also in July 2018, Prithu earned top honours in the team event of the Portuguese League in Porto, and in October of the same year, he was judged the second-best youngster in the under-18 category at the Isle of Man Masters in the UK.

In July 2019, at age 15, and three months after finishing runner-up amongst juniors at the Reykjavik Open (under-18 category), Prithu secured his third GM norm with a round to spare at the Porticcio Open in Corsica, where he finished ninth. A week later during the Portuguese League (first division), he became India's 64th Grandmaster – after his win in the fifth round against German IM Lev Yankelevich, Prithu's Elo rating crossed 2500.

For achieving his third Grandmaster norm and surpassing the 2500 Elo rating required to obtain the Grandmaster title, Prithu received the state award for outstanding sportspersons from the Government of Haryana in August 2019. In January 2020, he was awarded the Pradhan Mantri Rashtriya Bal Puraskar. The Rashtriya Bal Puraskar is presented to Indian citizens under the age of 18 in recognition of achievements in various fields, including sport.

== Achievements ==
- 2017: 1st IM norm, Silver Lake Open, Serbia
- 2017: 1st position, Golden Prague Chess Festival
- 2017: 2nd IM norm, Golden Prague Chess Festival
- 2018: Secured third IM norm and won title of International Master, Tradewise Gibraltar Masters, Gibraltar
- 2018: 1st GM norm, Tradewise Gibraltar Masters, Gibraltar
- 2018: 2nd GM norm, Biel International Chess Festival, Biel, Switzerland
- 2018: 1st position, team event, Portuguese Team Championship
- 2019: Achieved third and final GM norm, Porticcio Open, Corsica
- 2019: Became India's 64th Grandmaster, Portuguese League, Evora, Portugal
- 2020: Pradhan Mantri Rashtriya Bal Puraskar
