= Dietmar Kolbus =

German chess player (1966–2024)

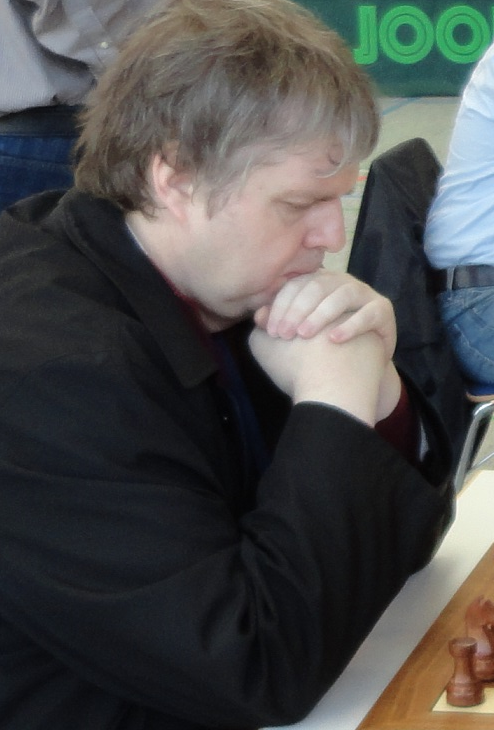
- Kolbus in 2014

Personal information
- Born: January 17, 1966 Rahden, Germany
- Died: July 22, 2024 (aged 58) Biel, Switzerland

Chess career
- Country: Germany (until 2021); Isle of Man (after 2021)
- Title: International Master (2005)
- Peak rating: 2419 (January 2006)

Dietmar Kolbus (January 17, 1966 – July 22, 2024) was a German chess player who resided in and played for Germany and the Isle of Man.

== Chess career ==
Kolbus moved to Trier in the 1980s to study computer science, and also joined the SG Trier Bundesliga Chess Team. He later sponsored the team, moving them into the 4NCL.

In October 2014, Kolbus was defeated by Abhijeet Gupta at the start of the Poker Masters Isle of Man International chess tournament.

Kolbus competed in the FIDE Grand Swiss Tournament 2023, where he was the bottom seed. He managed to hold draws against grandmasters Adhiban Baskaran, Adham Fawzy, and Alexandr Fier.

Kolbus died on July 22, 2024 while playing at the Biel Chess Festival 2024.

== Personal life ==
Off the chessboard, he was a programmer for SAP.
