= Keith Allen (chess player) =

Irish chess player (born 1962)

Personal information
- Born: February 2, 1962 (age 64)

Chess career
- Country: Ireland
- Peak rating: 2320 (January 1989)

Keith Allen is an Irish chess player who resides in the Isle of Man and has been Manx chess champion on six occasions since 1997.

== Chess career ==
He played for Ireland in the 1988 Chess Olympiad with a score of +5=1-4 on board 3.

He has won the Ulster Chess Championship in 1978, 1979, 1980, 1986, and 1989.

In April 2024, he won the Manx Chess Championship. He has previously been the champion in 1997, 1998, 1999, 2000, 2008, and 2022.
