= Open event at the 46th Chess Olympiad =

- The Uzbek team in the Open event (from left to right: Sindarov, Abdusattorov, captain Kasimdzhanov, Madaminov, Yakubboev and Vokhidov)
- Host city: Samarkand
- Country: Uzbekistan
- Nations: 204
- Teams: 206
- Athletes: 1,024
- Dates: 16–27 September 2026
- Main venue: Silk Road International Exhibition Centre

Medalists

Team
- 1st place, gold medalist(s): Uzbekistan
- 2nd place, silver medalist(s): India
- 3rd place, bronze medalist(s): Germany

Individual
- Board 1: (Uzbekistan) Nodirbek Abdusattorov
- Board 2: (China) Wei Yi
- Board 3: (Germany) Frederik Svane
- Board 4: (Ukraine) Ihor Samunenkov
- Reserve: (Hungary) Gleb Dudin

The Open event at the 46th Chess Olympiad was held from 16 to 27 September 2026. It was contested by a record number of 206 teams, representing 204 nations. Uzbekistan, as host nation, fielded three teams. A total of 1,024 players participated in the Open event.

Uzbekistan won the gold medal in the Open event, which was their second title at the Chess Olympiads. The defending champions India won the silver medal and Germany completed the podium by winning the bronze medal. Nodirbek Abdusattorov of Uzbekistan achieved the highest performance rating of 2869 in the Open event after scoring 8½ out of a possible 11 points (seven wins and four draws) on board one. Individual gold medals on the other boards were won by Wei Yi of China with 7½ out of 10 and a performance rating of 2798, Frederik Svane of Germany with 8½ out of 11 and a performance rating of 2796, Ihor Samunenkov of Ukraine with 8 out of 10 and a performance rating of 2720, and Gleb Dudin of Hungary with 8 out of 10 and a performance rating of 2738.

== Competition format and calendar ==
The tournament was played in a Swiss system format. The time control for all games was 90 minutes for the first 40 moves, after which an additional 30 minutes were granted; an increment of 30 seconds per move was applied from the first move. Players were permitted to offer a draw at any time. A total of 11 rounds were to be played, and all teams had to be paired in every round.

In each round, four players from each team faced four players from another team; teams were permitted one reserve player who could be substituted between rounds. The four games were played simultaneously on four boards with alternating colours, scoring 1 game point for a win and ½ game point for a draw. The scores from each game were then summed together to determine which team would win the round. Winning a round was worth two match points, regardless of the game point margin, while drawing a round was worth one match point. Teams were ranked in a table based on match points. Tie-breakers for the table are i) the Sonneborn–Berger system; ii) total game points scored; iii) the sum of the match points of the opponents, excluding the lowest one.

The event took place from 15 to 27 September 2026. Tournament rounds began on 16 September and ended with the final round on 27 September. All rounds began at 15:00 local time (UTC+5:00), except for the final round which began at 11:00 local time (UTC+5:00). There was one rest day on 22 September, after the sixth round.

All times are UTC+5:00

1	Round	RD	Rest day

September	16th Wed	17th Thu	18th Fri	19th Sat	20th Sun	21st Mon	22nd Tue	23rd Wed	24th Thu	25th Fri	26th Sat	27th Sun
Tournament round	1	2	3	4	5	6	RD	7	8	9	10	11

== Teams and players ==
The Open event was contested by a total of 1,032 players from 208 teams. It featured eight of the top ten players from the FIDE rating list published in September 2026. Former five-time World Champion and current world no. 1 Magnus Carlsen was absent from the Olympiad, and Hikaru Nakamura missed his third consecutive Chess Olympiad. Hosts Uzbekistan were considered the pre-tournament favourites, while the defending champions India, the United States and China their most dangerous rivals. The Uzbek squad captained by former FIDE World Chess Champion Rustam Kasimdzhanov had four players that won gold and bronze at the previous two Olympiads, respectively. The team had the third-highest rating of 2720 and is led by Nodirbek Abdusattorov on the first board, followed by World Championship Challenger Javokhir Sindarov on the second board, then Nodirbek Yakubboev, Shamsiddin Vokhidov and Mukhiddin Madaminov on the remaining boards. Nevertheless, the team with the highest pre-tournament average rating were the United States, consisting of Fabiano Caruana, Wesley So, Levon Aronian, Hans Niemann and Awonder Liang as a reserve player, with an average rating of 2753. Niemann and Liang made their debut at the Chess Olympiads.

The defending champions India were the second-seeded team with an average rating of 2735. Their squad captained by Srinath Narayanan included reigning World Champion and winner of the individual gold medal on the top board at the previous two Olympiads Gukesh Dommaraju on board four, as well as R Praggnanandhaa, Arjun Erigaisi and Nihal Sarin on the first three boards and Vidit Gujrathi as a reserve player. The only change from the gold-winning squad at the Budapest Olympiad was Nihal replacing Pentala Harikrishna. China with the average rating of 2707 started the tournament as the fourth seeds. The team was led by Ding Liren on board one and saw the former World Champion's return to the Chess Olympiads, while Wei Yi, Yu Yangyi, Xu Xiangyu and Kong Xiangrui completed the squad on the remaining boards. Germany were the fifth seeds with an average rating of 2677, captained by Jan Gustafsson, with Vincent Keymer, Matthias Blübaum, Frederik Svane, Alexander Donchenko and Rasmus Svane on the team. Other strong teams included the Netherlands, Azerbaijan, Hungary, France and Armenia.

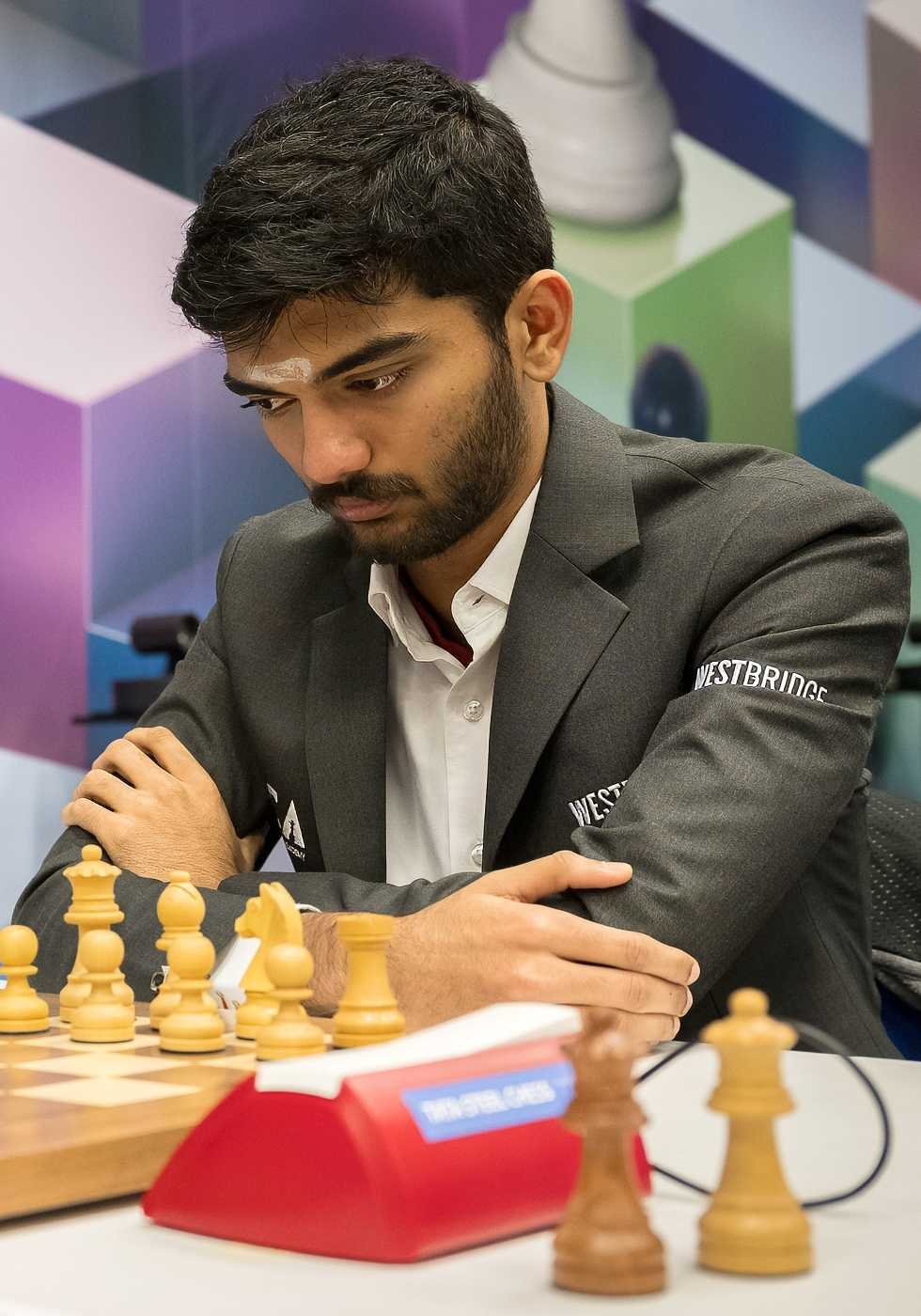
World Champion Gukesh Dommaraju played on board four for India

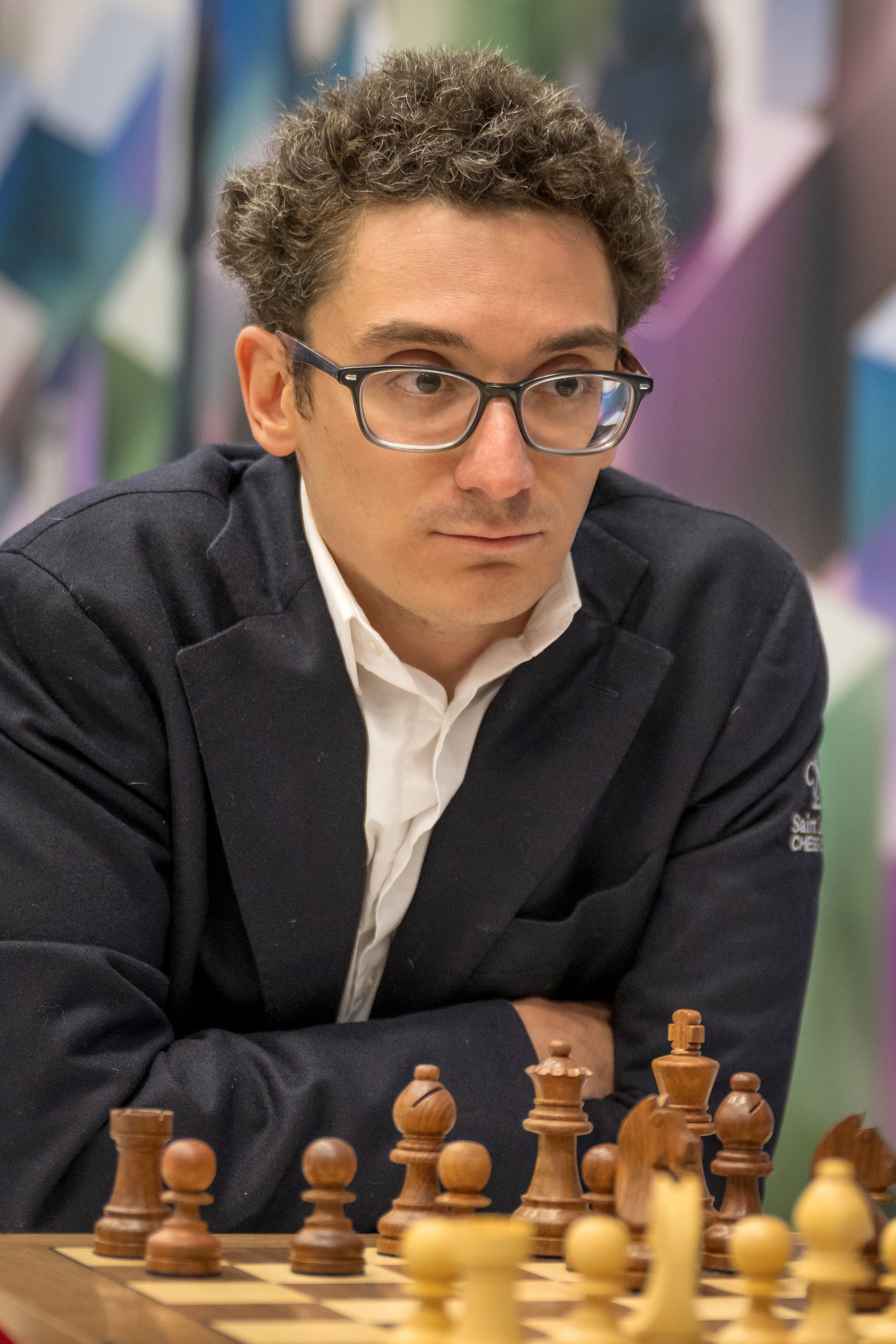
World no. 3 Fabiano Caruana played on board one for the United States

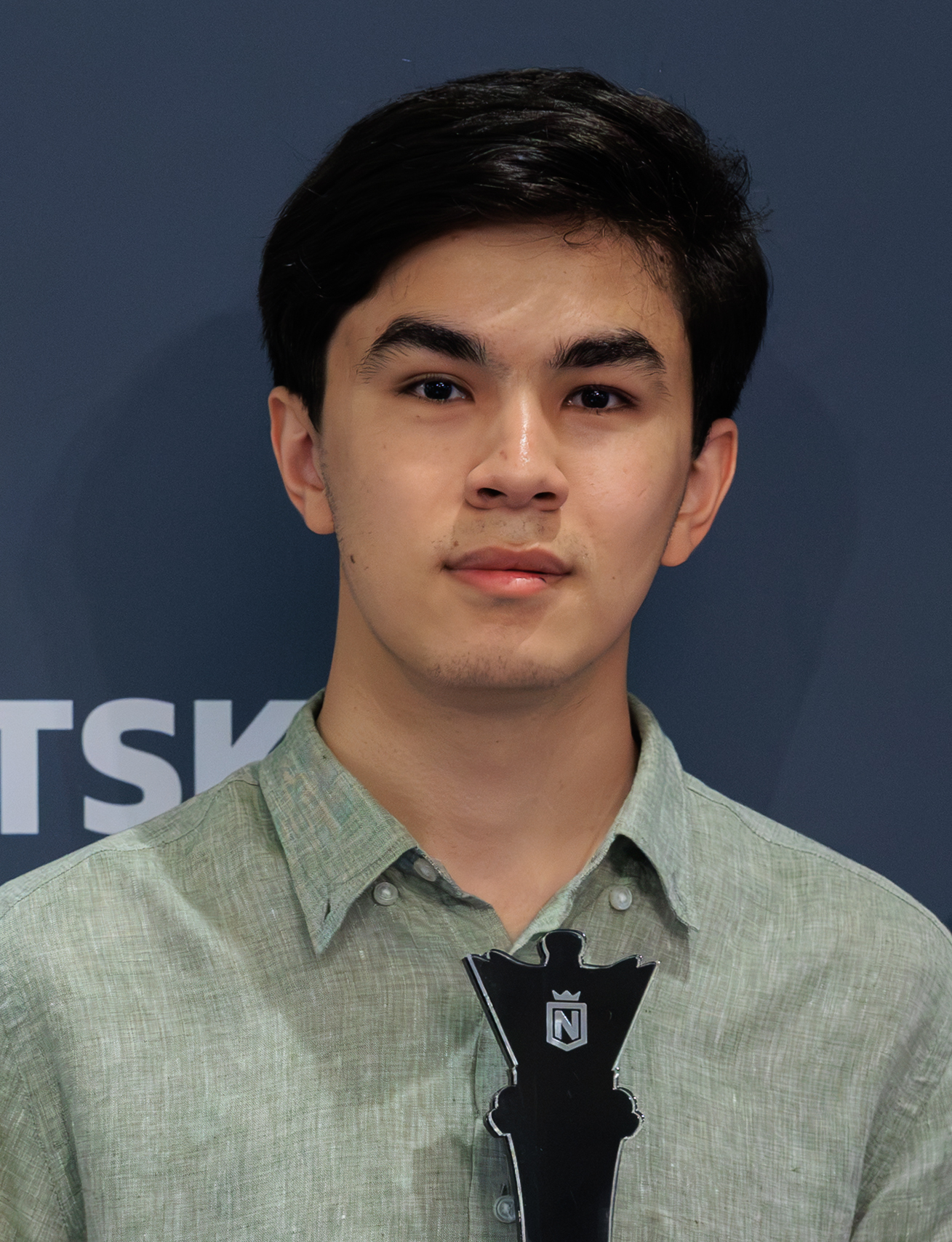
Upcoming World Championship challenger and World no. 4 Javokhir Sindarov played on board two for Uzbekistan

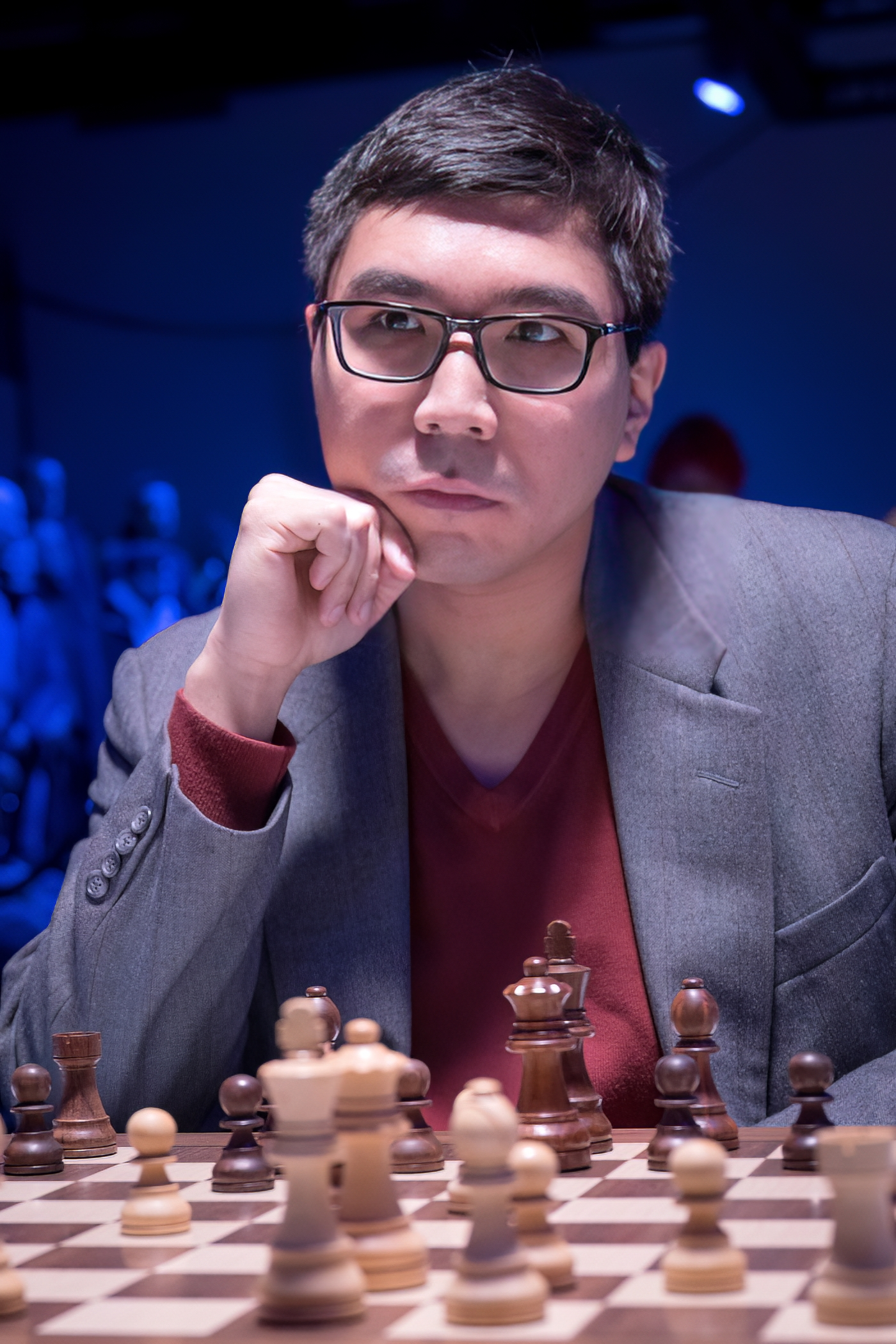
World no. 5 Wesley So played on board two for the United States

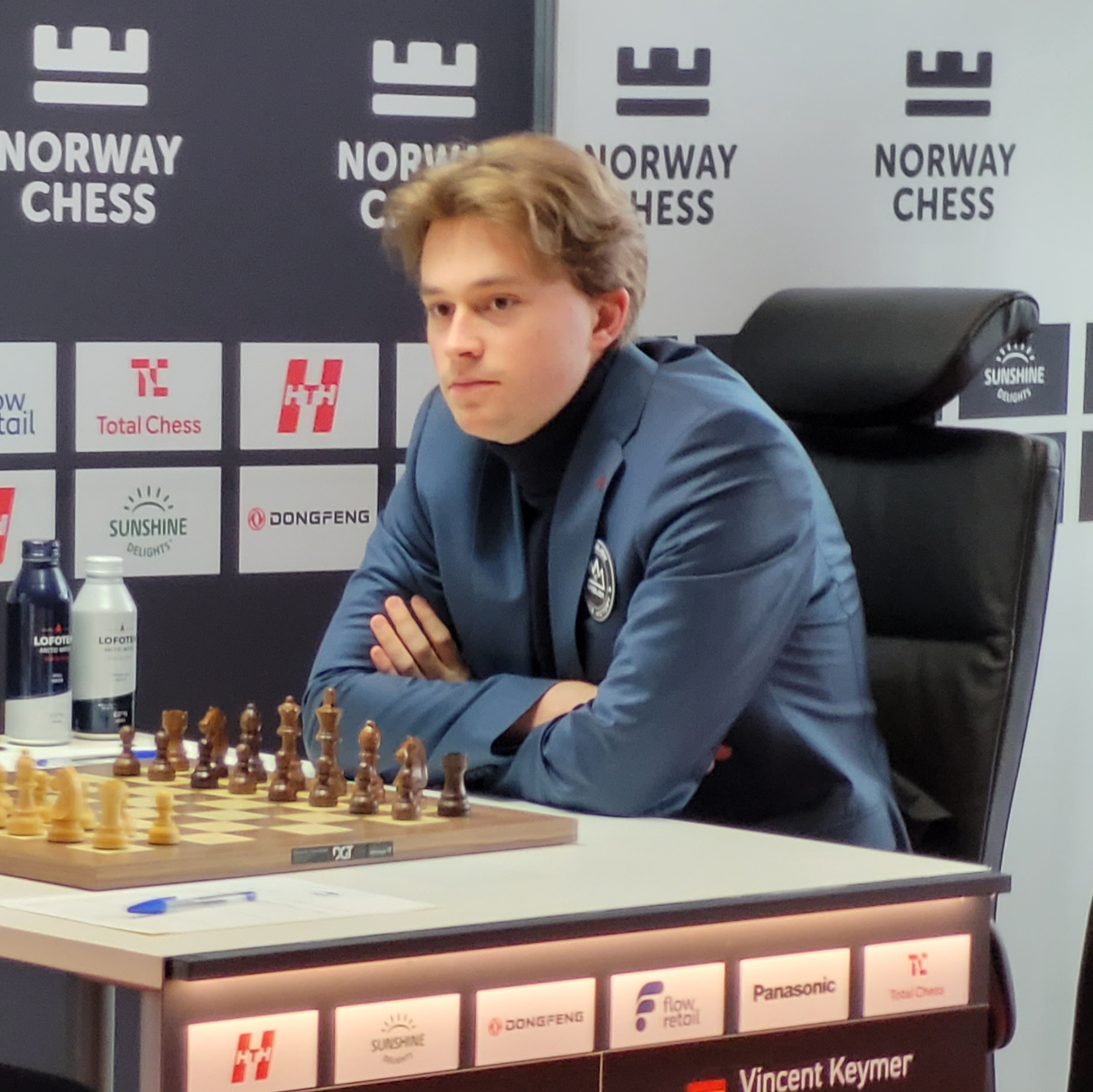
World no. 6 Vincent Keymer played on board one for Germany

== Rounds ==
=== Round 1 ===
Erigaisi vs. Laohawirapap

Position: c7 black king, f7 black pawn, a6 black pawn, e6 black pawn, f6 white pawn, e5 white pawn, g5 white queen, h4 white pawn, b3 white pawn, f3 white rook, h3 white king, e2 black rook, e1 black queen

In this position, Erigaisi committed the decisive blunder with 50. Qg7?? (50. Qf4 was the only move that held the position equal), allowing Black to continue with 50…Qh1+ 51.Kg4 Re4+ 52.Rf4 Qd1+ and catch White's king in a mating net with the queen and the rook. White resigned after 54 moves.

Former World Champion and FIDE Interim President Vishwanathan Anand made the opening move 1. c4 on board one for Joshua Christie in his game against Nodirbek Abdusattorov in the match between Jamaica and Uzbekistan. The first round saw favourites prevail, though with some major individual upsets. A total of 73 teams achieved perfect 4–0 victories. On the top ten match boards, Uzbekistan, China, Germany, Azerbaijan, France and Armenia scored perfect victories against Jamaica, Uganda, Faroe Islands, Morocco, Tunisia and Barbados, respectively. The top seeds United States conceded half a point to Iraq after Levon Aronian was held to a draw by CM Ehsan Ali Aryan on board three. In his Olympiad debut, Hans Niemann scored a crushing 23-move win.

The defending champions India faced the biggest upset of the round as Arjun Erigaisi lost his game on the top board to IM Prin Laohawirapap following a blunder in a tricky position after having a better position in much of the game (see diagram). However, his team ultimately defeated Thailand 3–1 thanks to the wins scored on the remaining three boards. Hungary faced some difficulties against Malta, with Benjamin Gledura losing his game on board two with the Black pieces and Tamás Bánusz drawing his game with the White pieces on board three, but they managed to score a 2½–1½ victory thanks to wins by Peter Leko and Gleb Dudin on the highest and lowest boards.

=== Round 2 ===
Nihal vs. Hafiz

Position: c8 black king, d8 black rook, b7 black bishop, d7 black knight, g7 black pawn, a6 black pawn, d6 white rook, f6 black pawn, g6 white pawn, e5 black pawn, a4 white knight, b4 black pawn, e4 black pawn, g4 white queen, b3 white pawn, a2 white pawn, b2 white bishop, f2 black queen, h2 black rook, a1 white king, g1 white rook

This position was equal, but black played the losing 26... Kc7? (26... Kb8 was the only move that held draw). After 27. Rgd1 Bc6 , Nihal sacrificed his rook with 28. Rxc6+!! and eventually won after 37 moves.

In the second round, many of the strongest players representing the favourites made their first appearances in the tournament, but none of the favourites achieved a perfect 4–0 result. Poland, Croatia, Lithuania, Belarus and Iceland remained the only teams with individual wins on all boards after two rounds. The United States faced difficulties against Mongolia, as Hans Niemann drew his game on board two and Awonder Liang suffered the biggest upset of the round by losing to Khuyagtsogt Itgelt on the last board. Thanks to wins by Fabiano Caruana and Levon Aronian, the United States narrowly won the match 2½–1½. R Praggnanandhaa also made his first appearance, but the defending champions India were unable to achieve an easy win against Indonesia, with three of their games ending in draws. But Nihal Sarin, who had been in a losing position against Arif Abdul Hafiz, capitalised on his opponent's later mistakes by launching a decisive counterattack (see diagram) to win his game on board two, helping India win the match 2½–1½. Following the match, World Champion Gukesh Dommaraju, who drew his game, dropped below 2700 in live ratings for the first time in four years.

Uzbekistan scored a 3½–½ victory against Peru with wins on the top three boards, including the World Championship challenger Javokhir Sindarov, who played his first game and sacrificed his queen before scoring a 32-move win. Only Mukhiddin Madaminov made a draw on the last board against Fernando Fernández Sánchez. Ukraine suffered a major upset as Vasyl Ivanchuk lost his game to IM Ilja Sirosh of Estonia. Ivanchuk, making his first appearance on the board, achieved a positional edge but made a decisive blunder, resulting in his defeat. However, Ukraine still won the match with wins on the remaining three boards. The remaining favourites China, Germany, Netherlands, Azerbaijan, Hungary, France and Armenia won their matches convincingly, although each conceded at least one draw against Chile, Uzbekistan-3, North Macedonia, Philippines, Colombia, Bosnia and Herzegovina and Scotland respectively.

=== Round 3 ===
Giri vs. Cheng

Position: c7 black bishop, h7 white rook, b6 black pawn, f6 black pawn, h6 white pawn, b5 white bishop, d5 black king, f5 white pawn, a4 white pawn, g3 black rook, e2 white king

In this position, Black played 63... Bf4?!, which increased white's winning advantage (63... Be5 would have prevented it). Cheng resigned after 76 moves when pawn promotion became unstoppable.

The third round saw all the favourites winning their matches, although several of them faced difficulties. The top seeds United States faced a challenge from Denmark, as Awonder Liang suffered another upset against Bjorn Moller Ochsner on the last board, while Fabiano Caruana escaped with a draw against Jonas Buhl Bjerre on the top board after holding a losing edge. However, they won their match narrowly by 2½–1½, thanks to wins by Wesley So and Hans Niemann. The defending champions India continued their winning run by defeating Italy 3–1 with wins by Nihal Sarin and Gukesh Dommaraju. Arjun Erigaisi, returning to the board after sitting out the previous round, could not convert his advantage against Luca Moroni and drew his game. Following the match, World Champion Gukesh explained the strategy behind him competing on board four rather than on the top boards by saying that his teammates Praggnandhaa and Erigaisi were in better shape to compete on the top boards. He further said:

It was my idea as well as the whole team's, while we all thought the same: that this order will give us the best chances of winning the tournament. And regarding the prospect of a world champion playing on board 4, I think if the team needs it, I would even rest for all the games. We are here playing for India and there is no player greater than his country, so I am just happy to do whatever it takes for the team to do well.

Uzbekistan defeated Austria 3–1 with wins scored by Javokhir Sindarov and Mukhiddin Madaminov, while China scored a 3½–½ victory against Bulgaria, including a magnificent 38-move win by former World Champion Ding Liren against Arkadij Naiditsch on the top board. The remaining favourites Germany, Netherlands, and Hungary won their matches against Uzbekistan-2, Australia, and Slovenia, respectively, with a 2½–1½ scoreline. Vincent Keymer scored the only win for Germany while the remaining three games ended in draws. The Netherlands faced a big scare against Australia, with Loek van Wely losing his game to Rishi Sardana, while Jorden van Foreest won his game and Erwin l'Ami made a draw on the last board, leaving Australia one draw away from holding the match to a draw. But Anish Giri fought valiantly throughout the endgame while maintaining a winning advantage against Bobby Cheng, and capitalised on his opponent's later mistake (see diagram) to win after 76 moves and secure a crucial 2½–1½ victory for his team. Richárd Rapport made a shocking blunder against Anton Demchenko that immediately resulted in his defeat after just 24 moves and Peter Leko drew against Jan Šubelj on board two, but thanks to wins by Tamás Bánusz and Gleb Dudin, Hungary scored a 2½–1½ victory against Slovenia and remained unbeaten after three rounds.

There were also a few upsets in this round as Norway and Brazil lost to Singapore and Kyrgyzstan, respectively. Johan-Sebastian Christiansen lost his game to Tin Jingyao on board one while the remaining three games ended in draws. Brazil also saw three of their games ending in draws while Diego Di Berardino lost to Timur Daudov on the last board.

=== Round 4 ===
Dehtiarov vs. Aronian

Position: a8 black bishop, c8 black rook, f8 black rook, h8 black king, b7 black knight, c7 black queen, d7 black pawn, f7 black pawn, e6 black pawn, f6 black bishop, a5 black pawn, b5 white pawn, c5 white rook, a3 white pawn, h3 white pawn, b2 white bishop, f2 white pawn, g2 white pawn, d1 white queen, e1 white rook, f1 white bishop, g1 white king

Black had the alternative to maintain an equal position with 26... Qf4, but Aronian played the bold 26... Bxb2!! and sacrificed his queen instead.

A total of eight teams scored their fourth match victory in this round. The United States won their match convincingly 3½–½ against Ukraine. Vasyl Ivanchuk held a positional edge before blundering under time pressure and lost his game against Fabiano Caruana. Wesley So won his game against Anton Korobov on board two while Hans Niemann made a quick draw against Ihor Samunenkov on board three. Roman Dehtiarov had a winning position against Levon Aronian but lost it while launching an attack on the Black king, after which Aronian sacrificed his queen (see diagram) to maintain an equal position. Aronian managed to win his game after 53 moves as Dehtiarov blundered in the endgame. India won their match 3–1 against Spain as Arjun Erigaisi and Gukesh Dommaraju scored crushing wins against Maksim Chigaev and Alexei Shirov, respectively. Uzbekistan faced Turkey, whose young talent Yağız Kaan Erdoğmuş, along with Ediz Gürel and Emre Can, drew against Nodirbek Abdusattorov, Javokhir Sindarov, and Shamsiddin Vokhidov, respectively. Thanks to a win by Nodirbek Yakubboev on board three against Vahap Şanal, Uzbekistan scored a minimal 2½–1½ victory.

The other favourites did not have problems. China scored a 3–1 victory against Serbia thanks to wins by Wei Yi and Kong Xiangrui. The games on the top three boards for Germany ended in draws against Poland, but Alexander Donchenko managed to win his game on the lowest board, as his opponent Jakub Kosakowski blundered during time pressure, which resulted in Germany winning the match 2½–1½. In the match between the Netherlands and Greece, Nikolas Theodorou and Dimitrios Mastrovasilis suffered early defeats against Anish Giri and Jorden van Foreest on the top boards. Their remaining teammates Stamatis Kourkoulos-Arditis and Dimitris Alexakis could not convert their advantages and drew against Loek van Wely and Casper Schoppen respectively after long endgames. As a result, the Netherlands defeated Greece 3–1 to remain unbeaten after four rounds. Hungary and Armenia won their matches against Israel and Argentina, respectively, with a 2½–1½ scoreline. Out of the top ten seeded teams, Azerbaijan and France were unable to score victories as they tied with Czech Republic and Romania, respectively, with all four games in each match ending in draws.

=== Round 5 ===
Svane vs. Niemann

Position: a8 black rook, f8 black bishop, b7 black bishop, d7 black queen, e7 black rook, f7 black knight, g7 black king, h7 black pawn, a6 black pawn, d6 black pawn, g6 black pawn, d5 white pawn, f5 black pawn, a4 white rook, d4 white pawn, e4 white knight, b3 white bishop, c3 white bishop, e3 white rook, f3 white queen, h3 white pawn, b2 white pawn, f2 white pawn, g2 white pawn, g1 white king

In this position, Svane continued with 27. Nc5!!, sacrificing his knight. Black could not capture it due to 28. dxc5+ Kg8 29. c6, forking the queen and the bishop.

Several strong matchups were featured in the fifth round. The only teams that extended their winning streak and scored the fifth match victories were the pre-tournament favourites India, Uzbekistan, and Germany. The top seeds United States were shocked as Germany pulled off a minimal 2½–1½ victory against them with three draws and a surprising win by Frederik Svane over Hans Niemann on board three. Svane gradually developed his advantage and continued with a knight sacrifice (see diagram) to keep Black on the back foot and ultimately won after 40 moves. Fabiano Caruana and Levon Aronian drew their games against Vincent Keymer and Alexander Donchenko, respectively, on the top and the last board. After failing to convert an edge, Wesley So drew his game against Matthias Blübaum after a hard-fought endgame. India defeated the Netherlands 3–1 thanks to wins by R Praggnanandhaa and Gukesh Dommaraju. Praggnanandhaa held a worse position against Anish Giri, who had won all four of his previous games. But as Giri blundered during time pressure, Praggnanandhaa played a flawless endgame to score a crucial victory for his team. Arjun Erigaisi and Nihal Sarin drew their games against Jorden van Foreest and Loek van Wely respectively, while Gukesh Dommaraju scored a victory against Erwin l'Ami on the last board.

The hosts Uzbekistan continued their impressive winning run by scoring an astonishing 4–0 victory against Hungary. The remaining favourites China and Azerbaijan tied 2–2 with Armenia and Romania, respectively. China drew all four of their games, while Azerbaijan saw their top board Shakhriyar Mamedyarov lose his game to Bogdan-Daniel Deac, but they were compensated by a win from Rauf Mamedov against David Gavrilescu on board four, and the remaining two games ended in draws. France scored a minimal 2½–1½ victory against Czech Republic thanks to a win by Jules Moussard against Jáchym Němec on the last board. Thai Dai Van Nguyen could not convert his advantage against Maxime Vachier-Lagrave on the top board and drew his game, allowing the latter to help avoiding a match tie for his team. England and Iran climbed up the leaderboard while remaining a point behind the leaders, as they scored victories against Georgia and Lithuania, respectively. Tajikistan produced an upset against Slovenia, as their bottom two boards scored wins after conceding a draw and a loss on the remaining boards, and won their match with a 2½–1½ scoreline.

=== Round 6 ===
Yakubboev vs. Nihal

Position: e8 black rook, b7 black pawn, c7 black queen, e7 black rook, a6 black pawn, c6 black pawn, d6 black knight, g6 black bishop, a5 white pawn, c5 white knight, g5 black king, b4 white pawn, d4 white pawn, h4 black pawn, e3 black pawn, g3 white pawn, e2 white rook, h2 white queen, e1 white rook, f1 white bishop, g1 white king

In this position, Nihal committed the decisive blunder with 37... Nf5?? which allowed White to win the queen with a discovered attack by 38. Ne6+!! Rxe6 39. gxh4+.

The main match of the sixth round was the most anticipated clash between the defending champions India and the host team and former champions Uzbekistan. R Praggnanandhaa and Gukesh, playing on the top and the bottom boards for India, pressed hard against Nodirbek Abdusattorov and Shamsiddin Vokhidov, respectively, but drew their games alongside Arjun Erigaisi, who was unable to convert his significant advantage against Javokhir Sindarov. Ultimately, the match was decided by the game between Nihal Sarin and Nodirbek Yakubboev. Nihal had a time advantage and achieved a positional edge, but made a decisive mistake while keeping his opponent under time pressure, allowing his queen to be captured (see diagram), resulting in his eventual loss. Thus, Uzbekistan won the match 2½–1½ against the defending champions, taking the sole lead before the rest day. China pulled off an impressive 3–1 victory against Germany thanks to wins by Ding Liren and Xu Xiangyu. The former World Champion played very precisely against Vincent Keymer on the top board until the latter blundered under severe time pressure, after which Ding prevailed in the endgame and scored a stunning 50-move win. Wei Yi and Matthias Blübaum repeated moves before drawing their game within an hour, while Yu Yangyi safely drew his game despite being outprepared by Frederik Svane. The United States defeated Norway 2½–1½ thanks to a win by Hans Niemann on board three against Frode Urkedal. Fabiano Caruana scored a draw in a double-edged game against Johan-Sebastian Christiansen, along with draws by Wesley So and Awonder Liang. Niemann gained an advantage after a poor opening phase and finally won his game after a turbulent endgame.

Israel forfeited their match against the Netherlands after not showing up due to the observance of Yom Kippur, the holiest day of the year in Judaism. Armenia defeated Iran 2½–1½ in a match with three draws, with the only win scored by Manuel Petrosyan on the lowest board. Azerbaijan edged out Argentina with the same scoreline in a match with similar developments wherein Aydin Suleymanli was the only player to achieve a full point on board two. Uzbekistan-2 climbed up the leaderboard with a minimal 2½–1½ victory against Spain thanks to a win by Abdimalik Abdisalimov over Maksim Chigaev. England tied with France 2–2 after Michael Adams won his game on board two against Étienne Bacrot, compensating his team for two draws and a loss on the remaining three boards. Similarly, Hungary tied with Romania, with Peter Leko scoring a crucial win on board two after his team conceded two draws and a loss on the lowest board by Tamas Banusz, who failed to convert his advantage and made a decisive mistake later. Poland drew Belarus despite Jan-Krzysztof Duda losing his game to Denis Lazavik.

=== Round 7 ===
So vs. Hovhannisyan

Position: d8 white king, f8 black king, f7 black pawn, g6 black pawn, c4 white pawn, d4 white rook, d3 black pawn, e2 black rook

In this position, 54. Kc7 was the only move that held the position around equal, following a mistake by Hovhannisyan with 53... Re2. But So blundered with 54. Rxd3, after which the game continued with 54... Rc2 55. Rd4 f5 56. Kd7 Kf7 57. Kd6 Kf6 58. c5 g5 59. c6 g4 60. c7 g3, and So resigned.

Uzbekistan, the sole leader after six rounds, snatched their seventh consecutive match victory by outplaying China 3–1, with wins by Nodirbek Abdusattorov and Nodirbek Yakubboev. Abdusattorov scored an astonishing win against Ding Liren after the latter made several blunders under time pressure, starting with 22... Ra7, which weakened his kingside attack. Javokhir Sindarov began to outprepare Wei Yi from the middlegame, but precise defence by the latter forced him to settle for a draw. Yakubboev won his game following a decisive mistake by his opponent Yu Yangyi. The match between the top seeded United States and Armenia ended in a 2–2 draw. Fabiano Caruana and Hans Niemann drew their games, while Awonder Liang scored an impressive victory against Gabriel Sargissian. Wesley So had a worse position against Robert Hovhannisyan, but equalised before blundering again in a rook endgame (see diagram), resulting in his loss and allowing Armenia to tie the match. The defending champions India narrowly won 2½–1½ against England. Rameshbabu Praggnanandhaa and Gukesh Dommaraju scored impressive wins, while Arjun Erigaisi drew his game on board two against Michael Adams, which helped their team secure the match victory. However, Nihal Sarin lost his game to Luke McShane after he equalised following a huge mistake, but blundered again and went a pawn down in the endgame.

Germany won 3–1 against Turkey, thanks to wins by the Svane brothers—Frederik and Rasmus—against Işık Can and Vahap Şanal, respectively. The Netherlands, Azerbaijan and Serbia outplayed Bulgaria, Greece and Kazakhstan, respectively, with 3½–½ scorelines. France faced difficulties against Uzbekistan-2, but drew all four games to tie the match 2–2. Maxime Vachier-Lagrave on the top board entered a losing position against Jakhongir Vakhidov from the opening, but stayed ahead on the clock for the rest of the game and equalised, ultimately holding a draw. Jules Moussard had a chance to secure victory for France as he had an advantage against Ortik Nigmatov on the lowest board. But with both players having less than a minute on the clock, Moussard blundered into a worse position within a few moves and, unaware of the win, Nigmatov drew his game after repeating moves. Hungary also faced difficulties against Australia, as their top board Richard Rapport suffered an upset against Bobby Cheng. However, they edged out Australia 2½–1½ thanks to wins by Benjamin Gledura and Gleb Dudin on the lower two boards.

=== Round 8 ===
Gumularz vs. Wei

Position: b8 black king, g8 black rook, h8 black rook, b7 black bishop, c7 black pawn, a6 black pawn, c6 black queen, a5 white pawn, b5 black pawn, c5 white pawn, e5 white pawn, g5 black pawn, g4 white pawn, c3 white queen, d3 black pawn, e3 white pawn, f3 white pawn, d2 white bishop, h2 black pawn, c1 white rook, f1 white king, h1 white bishop

In this position, Wei played 32... Qxf3!!, sacrificing his queen, and after 33. Bxf3 Bxf3 34.Kf2 Rf8! 35.e4 Bd1+, Gumularz resigned as 36... h1Q could not be stopped.

The eighth round saw the winning streak of the sole leader Uzbekistan come to an end as a result of the narrow 2½–1½ loss to Germany. The Svane brothers—Frederik and Rasmus—once again scored crucial victories for their team against Nodirbek Yakubboev and Shamsiddin Vokhidov, respectively. Frederik managed to put time pressure on Yakubboev and gradually developed an advantage, but later went low on time himself. While both players were under time pressure, Yakubboev made a big mistake, after which Svane found the correct moves with less time, forcing Yakubboev to resign after 29 moves with less than a minute on the clock. Vincent Keymer missed a winning opportunity as White during the endgame and drew against Nodirbek Abdusattorov on the top board. Javokhir Sindarov was the only player from Uzbekistan to win, as he played a crushing game against Matthias Blübaum on board two. India were unable to catch the leaders after tying their match 2–2 against Azerbaijan. R Praggnanandhaa was unable to convert an edge under time pressure and agreed to a draw with Shakhriyar Mamedyarov, while Arjun and Vidit also drew their games after being unable to gain an advantage. Gukesh Dommaraju, the last player to have his game ongoing, held a significant advantage, but could not convert and drew his game as well, against Mahammad Muradli.

Seven other teams joined India in a tie for third place, trailing the leaders by a point: the United States, China, the Netherlands, Azerbaijan, France, Armenia and Uzbekistan-2. The United States outplayed Serbia 3½–½ thanks to wins by Fabiano Caruana, Hans Niemann and Awonder Liang. China scored a minimal 2½–1½ victory against Poland, where Wei Yi, as Black, scored the only win in the match against Szymon Gumularz with a spectacular queen sacrifice (see diagram). France won their match with the same scoreline against Iran, achieving two victories and a draw after conceding a loss. The Netherlands tied 2–2 with Armenia wherein Jorden van Foreest defeated Robert Hovhannisyan for his sixth victory in seven games. Uzbekistan-2 narrowly won 2½–1½ against England as Khumoyun Begmuratov secured a victory on the last board against Daniel Fernandez while the remaining three games ended in draws. Turkey, Ukraine, and Spain climbed up in the standings as they won by the same scoreline against Canada, Belarus, and Montenegro, respectively, with each team scoring a win and the remaining three games ending in draws.

=== Round 9 ===
Donchenko vs. Gukesh

Position: b7 black pawn, c7 black pawn, g7 black king, c6 black knight, f6 black pawn, g6 black knight, c5 white pawn, d5 black pawn, d4 white pawn, g4 white pawn, b3 white pawn, c3 white bishop, f3 white rook, a2 black rook, e2 white bishop, h2 white pawn, c1 black queen, f1 white queen, g1 white king

In this position, Gukesh played 51... Nf4!!, sacrifing his queen. White could not capture the queen due to 52... Nxe2+ which loses the bishop and allow the queen to be captured by a fork.

The ninth round featured the clash between the co-leaders Uzbekistan and the pre-tournament top-seeds the United States, which the Uzbek team won 3–1 to retain their sole lead. Fabiano Caruana held his game equal before making several blunders under time pressure, leading to his defeat against Nodirbek Abdusattorov. Hans Niemann equalised from a losing position but made a decisive blunder that allowed Nodirbek Yakubboev to win after 66 moves. Wesley So won the only game for the American team by defeating Javokhir Sindarov, who made several mistakes as Black under time pressure, allowing So to launch a decisive kingside attack and win after 49 moves. Mukhiddin Madaminov secured a draw against Levon Aronian with the Black pieces. India edged out the co-leaders Germany 2½–1½ thanks to a crucial win by World Champion Gukesh Dommaraju against Alexander Donchenko with the Black pieces. Gukesh gradually entered a losing position amidst time pressure but found a comeback opportunity after Donchenko blundered his advantage and subsequently made a decisive mistake. Gukesh continued with a queen sacrifice, which White could not accept due to a fork that would lose material (see diagram), ultimately snatching the victory. Nihal Sarin managed to draw his game against Frederik Svane after having troubles under time pressure.

China escaped with a 2–2 draw against France as Wei Yi gradually entered a losing position against Maxime Lagarde, starting with an incorrect exchange sacrifice on move 23. After maintaining his advantage for most of the game, Lagarde blundered in the endgame under time pressure, allowing Wei to draw his game with a perfect piece sacrifice. Uzbekistan-2 scored a big 3½–½ victory against the Netherlands in a match after Jakhongir Vakhidov, Mukhammadzokhid Suyarov and Ortik Nigmatov secured flawless victories against Anish Giri, Loek van Wely and Erwin l'Ami, respectively. Jorden van Foreest scored the only half-point for the Dutch team after drawing his game against Abdimalik Abdisalimov, despite sacrificing a piece on move 22 and holding a winning position. Armenia minimally defeated Azerbaijan 2½–1½, as Gabriel Sargissian was the only one to score a full point in his game with Rauf Mamedov on the lowest board. Hungary defeated Austria 3–1 with all four games being decisive; only Peter Leko from the Hungarian team lost his game to Felix Blohberger after making a decisive blunder in the endgame under severe time pressure. Ukraine and Spain also won their matches against Georgia and Czech Republic, respectively, to stay in the race, along with Armenia and Hungary, with a two-point deficit.

=== Round 10 ===
Kovalenko vs. Ding

Position: e8 black rook, f8 black king, b7 black pawn, c7 black pawn, e7 black rook, g7 black pawn, a6 black pawn, c6 black bishop, d6 black bishop, g6 black knight, a5 white pawn, c5 black pawn, e5 black pawn, f5 black queen, h5 black pawn, c4 white knight, e4 white knight, h4 white pawn, b3 white pawn, d3 white pawn, f3 white pawn, g3 white bishop, c2 white pawn, e2 white rook, g2 white pawn, h2 white queen, e1 white rook, g1 white king

In this position, Ding blundered with 44... Re6??, after which White continued with 45. Ne3 Qf7 46. Ng5 Qd7 47. Nxe6+, winning a rook and after 47... Qxe6 48. Nc4, Ding resigned.

The hosts Uzbekistan scored a big 3½–½ victory against Armenia in the penultimate round and maintained their sole lead. Nodirbek Abdusattorov secured a win with Black against Haik Martirosyan after playing the Scandinavian Defense, which is uncommon at the top level. Javokhir Sindarov scored an impressive win against Robert Hovhannisyan after he traded both of his rooks for a knight and three pawns as part of his preparation, and capitalised on his opponent's blunder to prevail in the endgame. Nodirbek Yakubboev equalised after entering a losing position against Shant Sargsyan and secured a draw with Black pieces. The defending champions India also secured a 3½–½ victory, defeating Uzbekistan-2, the secondary team of the hosts, retaining sole second place with a one-point deficit behind the leaders. R Praggnanandhaa, Nihal Sarin and Gukesh Dommaraju secured flawless victories against Jakhongir Vokhidov, Mukhammadzokhid Suyarov and Ortik Nigmatov, respectively, ensuring that their team faced no difficulties while saving their chances.

Three teams were tied for third place with 16 match points: Germany, Hungary and Ukraine. Germany defeated France 3–1 as the Svane brothers achieved full points on the lowest boards with wins over Maxime Lagarde and Marc'Andria Maurizzi, respectively. Ukraine scored a crucial 3–1 victory over China to stay in the medal race thanks to wins by Igor Kovalenko and Roman Dehtiarov against Ding Liren and Kong Xiangrui, respectively. Ding, playing as Black, held a worse position against Kovalenko despite both players struggling to make progress. But Ding blundered on move 44 (see diagram), allowing White to win a rook and launch decisive attack to win after 48 moves. Wei Yi could not convert an edge against Vasyl Ivanchuk and drew his game along with Xu Xiangyu, while Kong Xiangrui made a decisive mistake and lost against Roman Dehtiarov on the lowest board. Hungary defeated Spain 3–1 as Richard Rapport, Peter Leko, and Gleb Dudin secured victories against David Antón Guijarro, Maksim Chigaev, and Daniil Yuffa, respectively.

A clash between notable prodigies, Yağız Kaan Erdoğmuş and Faustino Oro, took place in the match between Turkey and Argentina. Oro held the game roughly equal before making a decisive blunder with less than a minute on his clock and ended up losing on time after just 28 moves. Turkey went on to win 3½–½ against Argentina with wins by Ediz Gürel and Vahap Şanal on the remaining boards.

=== Round 11 ===
Blübaum vs. van Foreest

Position: a8 black rook, b8 black queen, c8 black knight, f7 black pawn, g7 black king, a6 black bishop, b6 black pawn, e6 black pawn, g6 black pawn, b5 white knight, d5 black pawn, g5 black pawn, a4 white pawn, d4 white pawn, d3 white bishop, e3 white pawn, h3 white pawn, b2 white queen, f2 white pawn, g2 white pawn, c1 white rook, g1 white king

This is the position after White's 26. Rc1, in which van Forest played 26... Nd6?, allowing his opponent to win the exchange after 27. Nc7 Bxd3 28. Nxa8 Qxa8 29. Qa3! with a double attack on the bishop and knight.

Uzbekistan secured the gold medal with a narrow 2½–1½ victory over Ukraine with the only decisive game in the match won by Mukhiddin Madaminov as Black against Roman Dehtiarov on the lowest board, in which the 19-year-old Uzbek managed to convert a rook endgame with an extra pawn. India and Hungary split the points with a 2–2 tie after exchanging one win. Gleb Dudin defeated World Champion Gukesh Dommaraju with the White pieces on board four, while Arjun Erigaisi achieved a full point with the Black pieces against Peter Leko on board two. Germany achieved a 2½–1½ victory against the Netherlands with a single win from Matthias Blübaum over Jorden van Foreest on the second board. Blübaum took advantage when van Forest had to give up the exchange and managed to simplified the position into a winning pawn endgame (see diagram). As a result, Germany caught India with 18 match points in the final standings, but the Indian team won the tie-breaker to clinch the silver and Germany finished with the bronze medal.

== Final standings ==
Uzbekistan won the gold medal in the Open event with a total of 20 out of 22 possible match points, thus claiming their second title after the first one won in 2022. They scored 10 match victories and suffered only one loss. On the road to the gold medal, they defeated the United States, India, China, Hungary and Armenia, losing only to Germany in the eighth round. India and Germany finished with 18 match points, but India won the tie-breaker to win the silver medal mostly due to the minimal 2½–1½ victory in their head-to-head matchup in the ninth round. The pre-tournament top-seeds the United States, Azerbaijan, Armenia and Hungary shared the fourth to seventh place with 17 points, while China finished in eighth place after being among the leaders throughout much of the tournament. France and Spain finished in ninth and tenth place, respectively, with the same match points and worse tie-breaker than China.

Nodirbek Abdusattorov, who played on the top board for the winning Uzbek team, achieved the highest performance rating of 2869 in the Open event after scoring 8½ out of a possible 11 points (seven wins and four draws). On the way to the individual gold medal, he defeated the highest-rated player in the tournament Fabiano Caruana, former World Champion Ding Liren, and Richárd Rapport. Individual gold medals on the other boards were won by Wei Yi of China with 7½ out of 10 and a performance rating of 2798, Frederik Svane of Germany with 8½ out of 11 and a performance rating of 2796, Ihor Samunenkov of Ukraine with 8 out of 10 and a performance rating of 2720, and Gleb Dudin of Hungary with 8 out of 10 and a performance rating of 2738. Turkish chess prodigy Yağız Kaan Erdoğmuş had the second highest performance rating of 2839 with a score of 8 out of 10 (six wins and four draws), which was enough for the silver medal on board one.

Final standings
#	Country	Players	Average rating	MP	dSB^{†}
1st place, gold medalist(s)	Uzbekistan	Abdusattorov, Sindarov, Yakubboev, Vokhidov, Madaminov	2720	20	
2nd place, silver medalist(s)	India	Praggnanandhaa, Erigaisi, Nihal, Gukesh, Vidit	2735	18	405.5
3rd place, bronze medalist(s)	Germany	Keymer, Blübaum, F Svane, Donchenko, R Svane	2677	18	386.5
4	United States	Caruana, So, Niemann, Aronian, Liang	2753	17	391.5
5	Azerbaijan	Mamedyarov, Suleymanli, Muradli, Mamedov, Safarli	2623	17	364.5
6	Armenia	Martirosyan, Hovhannisyan, Sargsyan, Sargissian, Petrosyan	2637	17	339.5
7	Hungary	Rapport, Leko, Gledura, Bánusz, Dudin	2652	17	320.5
8	China	Ding Liren, Wei Yi, Yu Yangyi, Xu Xiangyu, Kong Xiangrui	2707	16	374.5
9	France	Vachier-Lagrave, Bacrot, Lagarde, Maurizzi, Moussard	2638	16	366.5
10	Spain	Antón Guijarro, Chigaev, Santos Latasa, Shirov, Yuffa	2620	16	354.5

Notes

- Average ratings calculated by chess-results.com based on September 2026 FIDE ratings.
- ^† The Sonneborn–Berger score is a tie-breaking criterion used to rank teams with equal match points.

All board prizes were given out according to performance ratings for players who played at least eight games at the tournament. The winners of the gold medal on each board are listed in turn:

- Board 1: (Uzbekistan) Nodirbek Abdusattorov 2869
- Board 2: (China) Wei Yi 2798
- Board 3: (Germany) Frederik Svane 2796
- Board 4: (Ukraine) Ihor Samunenkov 2720
- Reserve: (Hungary) Gleb Dudin 2738

== See also ==
- Women's event at the 46th Chess Olympiad
