= FIDE Grand Swiss Tournament 2025 =

Chess tournament in Samarkand, Uzbekistan

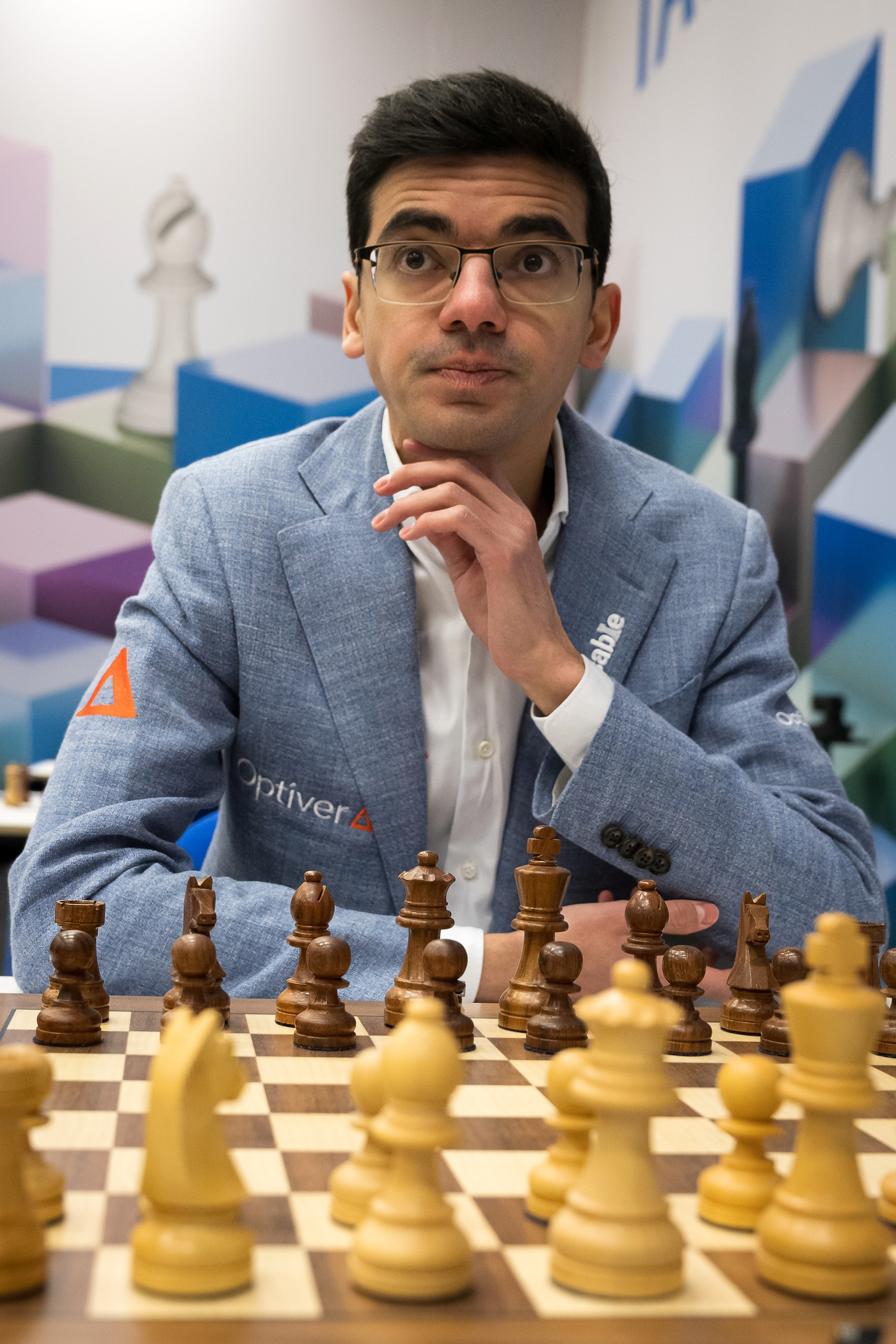
- 2025 Grand Swiss tournament winner Anish Giri

Tournament information
- Sport: Chess
- Location: Samarkand, Uzbekistan
- Dates: 3 September 2025–15 September 2025
- Administrator: FIDE
- Format: 11-round Swiss-system tournament
- Venue: Silk Road EXPO

Final positions
- Champion: (Netherlands) Anish Giri
- Runner-up: (Germany) Matthias Blübaum

The FIDE Grand Swiss Tournament 2025 was a chess tournament organized by FIDE, an international governing body of chess, in September 2025. It was an 11-round Swiss-system tournament that formed part of the qualification cycle for the World Chess Championship 2026. Anish Giri won the tournament, and thus, along with the runner-up Matthias Blübaum, qualified for the Candidates Tournament 2026.

The Grand Swiss was open to both genders. The FIDE Women's Grand Swiss Tournament 2025 was held in parallel for women only.

== Format ==
The tournament had an 11-round Swiss format featuring 116 players.

The games used a classical time control of 100 minutes for the first 40 moves, then 50 minutes for the next 20 moves, then 15 minutes for the rest of the game, with a 30 second increment from move 1.

The total prize pool of the tournament was $625,000 USD, with the winner earning $90,000 and second $75,000.

=== Tie-breaks ===
Tie-breaks between players who finished on the same score were determined, in order, by the following criteria:

1. Average Rating of Opponents Cut 1
2. Buchholz Cut 1
3. Buchholz
4. Direct encounter between the tied players
5. Drawing of lots.

=== Venue and schedule ===
The tournament took place from 3–15 September 2025 at the Silk Road EXPO in Samarkand, Uzbekistan.

== Results ==
Notation: "1 (B 51)" indicates a win (1 point) with black pieces (B) against the player who finished 51st (Robert Hovhannisyan). The first tiebreak (labeled AROC-1) is the average rating of opponents "cut 1" (viz. excluding the lowest-rated opponent). The second tiebreak (labeled BC-1) is the Buchholz "cut 1" (viz. excluding the lowest-rated opponent).

Rank	Name	Rating	1	2	3	4	5	6	7	8	9	10	11	Total	AROC-1	BC-1
1	(Netherlands) Anish Giri	2746	1 (B 51)	0.5 (W 86)	0.5 (W 65)	0.5 (B 74)	1 (W 43)	1 (B 29)	0.5 (W 5)	0.5 (B 27)	1 (W 23)	0.5 (B 3)	1 (W 8)	8	2668	62
2	(Germany) Matthias Blübaum	2671	0.5 (W 32)	0.5 (B 57)	1 (W 105)	1 (B 56)	1 (W 35)	0.5 (W 5)	1 (B 6)	0.5 (W 9)	0.5 (B 10)	0.5 (B 4)	0.5 (W 3)	7.5	2695	66
3	(France) Alireza Firouzja	2754	1 (W 101)	1 (B 54)	0 (W 27)	0.5 (W 87)	1 (B 64)	0.5 (B 36)	1 (W 14)	0.5 (W 8)	1 (B 9)	0.5 (W 1)	0.5 (B 2)	7.5	2684	64
4	(Germany) Vincent Keymer	2751	0.5 (B 55)	1 (W 33)	0.5 (B 28)	1 (W 65)	0 (B 29)	1 (W 51)	0.5 (B 31)	1 (W 15)	1 (B 27)	0.5 (W 2)	0.5 (B 6)	7.5	2668	62.5
5	(United States) Abhimanyu Mishra	2611	0.5 (B 14)	1 (W 112)	1 (W 17)	0.5 (B 35)	1 (W 41)	0.5 (B 2)	0.5 (B 1)	0.5 (W 10)	0.5 (B 8)	0.5 (W 16)	0.5 (B 15)	7	2731	69.5
6	(India) Arjun Erigaisi	2771	0.5 (W 93)	1 (B 85)	1 (W 72)	0.5 (B 41)	1 (W 63)	0.5 (B 27)	0 (W 2)	0.5 (B 20)	1 (W 18)	0.5 (B 17)	0.5 (W 4)	7	2687	63
7	(United States) Andy Woodward	2557	0.5 (B 68)	0.5 (W 49)	1 (B 48)	0.5 (W 54)	0 (B 16)	1 (W 114)	0.5 (B 45)	0.5 (W 14)	1 (B 84)	1 (W 27)	0.5 (W 17)	7	2686	61
8	(United States) Hans Niemann	2733	0.5 (W 78)	0.5 (B 74)	1 (W 104)	0.5 (B 75)	0.5 (W 72)	1 (B 50)	1 (W 28)	0.5 (B 3)	0.5 (W 5)	1 (W 35)	0 (B 1)	7	2668	60.5
9	(India) Nihal Sarin	2693	0.5 (W 104)	1 (B 30)	0.5 (W 90)	0.5 (B 22)	1 (W 75)	1 (B 87)	1 (W 27)	0.5 (B 2)	0 (W 3)	0.5 (W 10)	0.5 (B 16)	7	2666	61.5
10	(Uzbekistan) Nodirbek Abdusattorov	2748	1 (W 71)	0.5 (B 65)	1 (W 73)	0.5 (B 27)	0.5 (W 28)	0.5 (B 54)	1 (W 36)	0.5 (B 5)	0.5 (W 2)	0.5 (B 9)	0.5 (W 11)	7	2663	63
11	(United States) Awonder Liang	2698	0.5 (B 103)	0.5 (W 53)	0.5 (B 52)	1 (W 58)	0 (B 54)	0.5 (W 33)	1 (B 88)	1 (W 86)	0.5 (B 35)	1 (W 31)	0.5 (B 10)	7	2659	56
12	(Hungary) Richárd Rapport	2711	0.5 (B 53)	1 (W 80)	0.5 (W 77)	1 (B 32)	0 (W 27)	0.5 (B 73)	1 (W 74)	0.5 (W 35)	0.5 (B 31)	0.5 (B 20)	1 (W 36)	7	2657	57
13	(Azerbaijan) Shakhriyar Mamedyarov	2741	0.5 (W 74)	0.5 (B 78)	1 (W 101)	0.5 (B 72)	1 (W 86)	0.5 (B 28)	0.5 (W 20)	0 (B 23)	1 (W 73)	0.5 (B 36)	1 (W 43)	7	2649	55.5
14	(Uzbekistan) Nodirbek Yakubboev	2681	0.5 (W 5)	1 (B 92)	0.5 (W 61)	1 (B 90)	0.5 (W 87)	0.5 (W 22)	0 (B 3)	0.5 (B 7)	1 (W 72)	0.5 (B 42)	1 (W 44)	7	2645	59.5
15	(India) Vidit Gujrathi	2712	1 (W 59)	0.5 (B 73)	0.5 (W 32)	0.5 (B 34)	0.5 (W 74)	1 (B 72)	1 (W 29)	0 (B 4)	0.5 (W 20)	1 (B 25)	0.5 (W 5)	7	2640	61
16	(France) Maxime Vachier-Lagrave	2738	0.5 (B 62)	1 (W 76)	0.5 (B 75)	0 (W 29)	1 (W 7)	0 (B 20)	1 (W 96)	1 (B 54)	1 (W 28)	0.5 (B 5)	0.5 (W 9)	7	2637	60.5
17	(China) Yu Yangyi	2714	0.5 (B 80)	1 (W 62)	0 (B 5)	0.5 (W 73)	0.5 (B 33)	1 (W 38)	1 (B 75)	0.5 (W 31)	1 (B 29)	0.5 (W 6)	0.5 (B 7)	7	2634	60.5
18	(United States) Samuel Sevian	2692	0.5 (W 105)	0.5 (B 21)	0.5 (W 78)	1 (B 93)	0.5 (W 34)	0.5 (B 74)	0.5 (W 87)	1 (B 89)	0 (B 6)	1 (W 55)	1 (W 32)	7	2633	54.5
19	(FIDE) Andrey Esipenko	2687	0.5 (B 75)	1 (W 88)	0.5 (B 56)	0.5 (W 77)	0 (B 22)	1 (W 76)	0.5 (B 21)	0.5 (W 55)	0.5 (B 52)	1 (W 62)	1 (W 42)	7	2630	56
20	(Armenia) Shant Sargsyan	2653	0.5 (B 87)	0.5 (W 39)	0.5 (B 94)	1 (W 107)	0.5 (B 84)	1 (W 16)	0.5 (B 13)	0.5 (W 6)	0.5 (B 15)	0.5 (W 12)	0.5 (B 24)	6.5	2693	61.5
21	(Spain) Alexei Shirov	2616	0.5 (B 45)	0.5 (W 18)	0.5 (B 64)	0.5 (W 97)	1 (W 109)	0.5 (B 42)	0.5 (W 19)	0.5 (B 36)	1 (W 100)	0.5 (B 46)	0.5 (W 23)	6.5	2685	59
22	(India) Pranav V	2596	0.5 (B 67)	0.5 (W 63)	1 (B 68)	0.5 (W 9)	1 (W 19)	0.5 (B 14)	0.5 (W 23)	0.5 (B 42)	0 (W 36)	0.5 (B 50)	1 (W 69)	6.5	2679	62
23	(Netherlands) Jorden van Foreest	2692	0.5 (B 88)	0.5 (W 103)	0.5 (B 53)	1 (W 52)	0.5 (B 51)	1 (W 34)	0.5 (B 22)	1 (W 13)	0 (B 1)	0.5 (W 24)	0.5 (B 21)	6.5	2655	61.5
24	(Uzbekistan) Javokhir Sindarov	2722	0.5 (W 30)	0.5 (B 104)	0 (W 74)	0.5 (B 80)	1 (W 82)	0.5 (B 86)	1 (W 51)	0.5 (B 73)	1 (W 93)	0.5 (B 23)	0.5 (W 20)	6.5	2639	53.5
25	(Croatia) Ivan Šarić	2655	0.5 (W 95)	0 (B 61)	0.5 (W 59)	0.5 (B 113)	1 (W 104)	1 (B 90)	0.5 (W 89)	1 (B 87)	0.5 (W 42)	0 (W 15)	1 (B 57)	6.5	2627	51.5
26	(India) Pentala Harikrishna	2704	0 (W 72)	0.5 (B 106)	1 (B 110)	0.5 (W 33)	0.5 (B 76)	0.5 (W 55)	0.5 (B 62)	0 (W 52)	1 (W 83)	1 (B 74)	1 (B 54)	6.5	2617	52
27	(Iran) Parham Maghsoodloo	2692	1 (B 58)	1 (W 52)	1 (B 3)	0.5 (W 10)	1 (B 12)	0.5 (W 6)	0 (B 9)	0.5 (W 1)	0 (W 4)	0 (B 7)	0.5 (W 37)	6	2701	69.5
28	(Turkey) Yağız Kaan Erdoğmuş	2646	1 (W 82)	0.5 (B 41)	0.5 (W 4)	1 (B 37)	0.5 (B 10)	0.5 (W 13)	0 (B 8)	1 (W 84)	0 (B 16)	0.5 (W 29)	0.5 (B 39)	6	2701	64.5
29	(France) Marc'Andria Maurizzi	2610	0.5 (W 98)	0.5 (B 36)	1 (W 99)	1 (B 16)	1 (W 4)	0 (W 1)	0 (B 15)	1 (B 63)	0 (W 17)	0.5 (B 28)	0.5 (W 46)	6	2701	64.5
30	(Armenia) Aram Hakobyan	2625	0.5 (B 24)	0 (W 9)	0.5 (B 66)	0.5 (B 99)	0.5 (W 67)	0.5 (B 44)	1 (W 98)	1 (W 64)	0.5 (B 45)	0.5 (W 49)	0.5 (B 48)	6	2684	58.5
31	(Greece) Nikolas Theodorou	2646	0.5 (B 110)	0.5 (W 38)	0.5 (B 39)	1 (W 115)	0.5 (W 42)	1 (B 41)	0.5 (W 4)	0.5 (B 17)	0.5 (W 12)	0 (B 11)	0.5 (W 35)	6	2683	62.5
32	(Serbia) Alexandr Predke	2609	0.5 (B 2)	1 (W 66)	0.5 (B 15)	0 (W 12)	0 (B 45)	1 (W 68)	0.5 (B 48)	0.5 (W 49)	1 (B 86)	1 (W 40)	0 (B 18)	6	2676	63.5
33	(United States) Jeffery Xiong	2640	0.5 (W 35)	0 (B 4)	1 (W 106)	0.5 (B 26)	0.5 (W 17)	0.5 (B 11)	0.5 (W 37)	0.5 (B 90)	1 (W 89)	0 (B 44)	1 (W 82)	6	2676	60
34	(Ukraine) Vasyl Ivanchuk	2608	0.5 (W 46)	0.5 (B 99)	1 (W 69)	0.5 (W 15)	0.5 (B 18)	0 (B 23)	0.5 (W 50)	0 (B 43)	1 (W 96)	1 (B 100)	0.5 (W 49)	6	2668	59
35	(India) R Praggnanandhaa	2785	0.5 (B 33)	1 (W 60)	1 (B 97)	0.5 (W 5)	0 (B 2)	0.5 (W 40)	1 (W 54)	0.5 (B 12)	0.5 (W 11)	0 (B 8)	0.5 (B 31)	6	2666	64.5
36	(Iran) Amin Tabatabaei	2673	0.5 (B 94)	0.5 (W 29)	0.5 (B 58)	1 (W 103)	1 (B 77)	0.5 (W 3)	0 (B 10)	0.5 (W 21)	1 (B 22)	0.5 (W 13)	0 (B 12)	6	2663	62.5
37	(India) Aditya Mittal	2589	0.5 (B 40)	0.5 (W 68)	1 (B 49)	0 (W 28)	0.5 (B 114)	0.5 (W 97)	0.5 (B 33)	0.5 (W 48)	1 (B 76)	0.5 (W 45)	0.5 (B 27)	6	2657	57
38	(Ukraine) Ihor Samunenkov	2550	0.5 (W 69)	0.5 (B 31)	0.5 (W 93)	0.5 (B 50)	1 (W 70)	0 (B 17)	0 (W 86)	0.5 (B 51)	0.5 (W 71)	1 (B 112)	1 (W 73)	6	2654	55
39	(India) S. L. Narayanan	2591	0.5 (W 47)	0.5 (B 20)	0.5 (W 31)	0.5 (B 46)	0.5 (W 69)	0.5 (W 49)	0.5 (B 97)	0.5 (B 50)	0.5 (W 74)	1 (B 93)	0.5 (W 28)	6	2650	55
40	(Azerbaijan) Rauf Mamedov	2651	0.5 (W 37)	0 (B 89)	1 (W 92)	0.5 (B 57)	1 (W 61)	0.5 (B 35)	0 (W 42)	1 (B 94)	0.5 (W 44)	0 (B 32)	1 (W 80)	6	2650	57.5
41	(India) Gukesh Dommaraju	2767	1 (B 96)	0.5 (W 28)	1 (B 114)	0.5 (W 6)	0 (B 5)	0 (W 31)	0 (B 55)	0.5 (W 81)	0.5 (B 51)	1 (W 78)	1 (B 76)	6	2647	56.5
42	(FIDE) Ian Nepomniachtchi	2742	0.5 (B 76)	1 (W 55)	0.5 (B 86)	0.5 (W 51)	0.5 (B 31)	0.5 (W 21)	1 (B 40)	0.5 (W 22)	0.5 (B 25)	0.5 (W 14)	0 (B 19)	6	2646	61.5
43	(United States) Grigoriy Oparin	2660	0.5 (B 56)	1 (W 79)	0 (B 87)	1 (W 91)	0 (B 1)	0.5 (W 94)	0.5 (B 57)	1 (W 34)	0.5 (B 55)	1 (W 52)	0 (B 13)	6	2637	57
44	(Slovenia) Vladimir Fedoseev	2731	0 (B 52)	1 (W 115)	0 (B 51)	1 (W 85)	0 (B 73)	0.5 (W 30)	1 (B 78)	1 (W 56)	0.5 (B 40)	1 (W 33)	0 (B 14)	6	2634	56.5
45	(FIDE) Daniil Dubov	2691	0.5 (W 21)	0.5 (B 105)	0.5 (W 57)	0.5 (B 76)	1 (W 32)	0.5 (B 89)	0.5 (W 7)	0.5 (B 93)	0.5 (W 30)	0.5 (B 37)	0.5 (W 50)	6	2616	57
46	(FIDE) Volodar Murzin	2670	0.5 (B 34)	0.5 (W 94)	0.5 (B 91)	0.5 (W 39)	0.5 (B 57)	0.5 (W 53)	0.5 (B 60)	0.5 (W 75)	1 (B 88)	0.5 (W 21)	0.5 (B 29)	6	2611	55
47	(FIDE) Alexander Grischuk	2657	0.5 (B 39)	0 (W 56)	0.5 (B 88)	0.5 (W 79)	0.5 (B 58)	1 (W 92)	0.5 (B 91)	0.5 (W 57)	0.5 (B 77)	0.5 (W 53)	1 (B 75)	6	2610	52
48	(India) Raunak Sadhwani	2658	0.5 (W 61)	0.5 (B 95)	0 (W 7)	1 (B 105)	0.5 (W 90)	0.5 (B 77)	0.5 (W 32)	0.5 (B 37)	0.5 (W 80)	1 (B 72)	0.5 (W 30)	6	2607	54.5
49	(Sweden) Nils Grandelius	2648	0.5 (W 89)	0.5 (B 7)	0 (W 37)	0.5 (B 95)	1 (W 59)	0.5 (B 39)	0.5 (W 77)	0.5 (B 32)	1 (W 87)	0.5 (B 30)	0.5 (B 34)	6	2601	56.5
50	(Uzbekistan) Shamsiddin Vokhidov	2645	0.5 (B 115)	0.5 (W 110)	0.5 (B 107)	0.5 (W 38)	1 (B 81)	0 (W 8)	0.5 (B 34)	0.5 (W 39)	1 (B 60)	0.5 (W 22)	0.5 (B 45)	6	2592	56
51	(Armenia) Robert Hovhannisyan	2629	0 (W 1)	1 (B 116)	1 (W 44)	0.5 (B 42)	0.5 (W 23)	0 (B 4)	0 (B 24)	0.5 (W 38)	0.5 (W 41)	0.5 (B 89)	1 (W 87)	5.5	2687	61.5
52	(Spain) David Antón Guijarro	2625	1 (W 44)	0 (B 27)	0.5 (W 11)	0 (B 23)	0.5 (W 108)	0.5 (B 113)	1 (W 109)	1 (B 26)	0.5 (W 19)	0 (B 43)	0.5 (W 67)	5.5	2680	58.5
53	(Ukraine) Ruslan Ponomariov	2622	0.5 (W 12)	0.5 (B 11)	0.5 (W 23)	0.5 (B 109)	0.5 (W 98)	0.5 (B 46)	0.5 (W 64)	0.5 (B 99)	0.5 (W 63)	0.5 (B 47)	0.5 (B 68)	5.5	2678	58
54	(Israel) Maxim Rodshtein	2645	1 (W 83)	0 (W 3)	1 (B 60)	0.5 (B 7)	1 (W 11)	0.5 (W 10)	0 (B 35)	0 (W 16)	0.5 (B 56)	1 (B 90)	0 (W 26)	5.5	2676	64
55	(Turkey) Ediz Gurel	2631	0.5 (W 4)	0 (B 42)	0.5 (W 82)	0.5 (B 108)	1 (W 95)	0.5 (B 26)	1 (W 41)	0.5 (B 19)	0.5 (W 43)	0 (B 18)	0.5 (W 61)	5.5	2671	61
56	(Chile) Cristobal Henriquez Villagra	2594	0.5 (W 43)	1 (B 47)	0.5 (W 19)	0 (W 2)	0.5 (B 97)	1 (B 100)	0.5 (W 63)	0 (B 44)	0.5 (W 54)	0 (B 69)	1 (W 99)	5.5	2669	58
57	(France) Maxime Lagarde	2609	0.5 (B 66)	0.5 (W 2)	0.5 (B 45)	0.5 (W 40)	0.5 (W 46)	0.5 (B 64)	0.5 (W 43)	0.5 (B 47)	0.5 (W 69)	1 (B 99)	0 (W 25)	5.5	2666	60.5
58	(India) Aryan Chopra	2619	0 (W 27)	1 (B 102)	0.5 (W 36)	0 (B 11)	0.5 (W 47)	0.5 (B 99)	0.5 (W 101)	0.5 (B 96)	0.5 (W 70)	0.5 (B 64)	1 (W 100)	5.5	2666	54
59	(Germany) Alexander Donchenko	2624	0 (B 15)	0.5 (W 81)	0.5 (B 25)	0.5 (W 66)	0 (B 49)	1 (W 110)	0 (W 99)	0.5 (B 112)	1 (W 109)	0.5 (B 84)	1 (W 102)	5.5	2666	52
60	(FIDE) Ivan Zemlyanskii	2586	1 (W 70)	0 (B 35)	0 (W 54)	0.5 (B 96)	1 (W 71)	0.5 (B 69)	0.5 (W 46)	0.5 (B 74)	0 (W 50)	0.5 (B 102)	1 (W 93)	5.5	2664	55
61	(France) Jules Moussard	2591	0.5 (B 48)	1 (W 25)	0.5 (B 14)	0 (W 63)	0 (B 40)	0.5 (W 65)	0.5 (B 76)	0.5 (W 68)	0.5 (B 64)	1 (W 86)	0.5 (B 55)	5.5	2654	58
62	(Hungary) Sanan Sjugirov	2627	0.5 (W 16)	0 (B 17)	0 (W 109)	1 (B 116)	0.5 (W 113)	1 (B 82)	0.5 (W 26)	0.5 (W 66)	1 (B 81)	0 (B 19)	0.5 (W 63)	5.5	2646	56
63	(England) Nikita Vitiugov	2666	0.5 (W 90)	0.5 (B 22)	1 (W 95)	1 (B 61)	0 (B 6)	0.5 (W 84)	0.5 (B 56)	0 (W 29)	0.5 (B 53)	0.5 (W 75)	0.5 (B 62)	5.5	2637	56
64	(United States) Sam Shankland	2670	1 (W 106)	0 (B 72)	0.5 (W 21)	1 (B 78)	0 (W 3)	0.5 (W 57)	0.5 (B 53)	0 (B 30)	0.5 (W 61)	0.5 (W 58)	1 (B 77)	5.5	2630	57
65	(Germany) Frederik Svane	2643	1 (W 108)	0.5 (W 10)	0.5 (B 1)	0 (B 4)	0 (W 89)	0.5 (B 61)	0.5 (W 113)	0 (B 83)	1 (W 110)	0.5 (B 87)	1 (W 90)	5.5	2621	54.5
66	(United States) Ray Robson	2674	0.5 (W 57)	0 (B 32)	0.5 (W 30)	0.5 (B 59)	1 (W 80)	0.5 (B 96)	0.5 (W 72)	0.5 (B 62)	0.5 (W 90)	0.5 (B 82)	0.5 (W 71)	5.5	2621	53.5
67	(Poland) Radosław Wojtaszek	2661	0.5 (W 22)	0 (B 90)	0.5 (W 80)	0.5 (B 104)	0.5 (B 30)	0 (W 88)	0.5 (B 92)	0.5 (W 79)	1 (B 115)	1 (W 91)	0.5 (B 52)	5.5	2613	50
68	(Germany) Dmitrij Kollars	2647	0.5 (W 7)	0.5 (B 37)	0 (W 22)	0 (B 82)	1 (W 105)	0 (B 32)	1 (W 106)	0.5 (B 61)	1 (W 94)	0.5 (B 80)	0.5 (W 53)	5.5	2602	55
69	(China) Lu Shanglei	2647	0.5 (B 38)	0.5 (W 107)	0 (B 34)	1 (W 111)	0.5 (B 39)	0.5 (W 60)	0.5 (B 94)	0.5 (W 77)	0.5 (B 57)	1 (W 56)	0 (B 22)	5.5	2595	54.5
70	(Serbia) Aleksandar Indjic	2650	0 (B 60)	0.5 (W 113)	0.5 (B 111)	1 (W 110)	0 (B 38)	0 (W 91)	0.5 (B 107)	1 (W 95)	0.5 (B 58)	0.5 (W 81)	1 (B 89)	5.5	2580	47.5
71	(Serbia) Velimir Ivic	2630	0 (B 10)	0.5 (W 108)	0 (B 115)	1 (W 83)	0 (B 60)	1 (W 79)	0 (B 81)	1 (W 107)	0.5 (B 38)	1 (W 88)	0.5 (B 66)	5.5	2579	51.5
72	(Slovenia) Anton Demchenko	2620	1 (B 26)	1 (W 64)	0 (B 6)	0.5 (W 13)	0.5 (B 8)	0 (W 15)	0.5 (B 66)	1 (W 97)	0 (B 14)	0 (W 48)	0.5 (W 84)	5	2709	63.5
73	(India) Abhimanyu Puranik	2640	1 (B 81)	0.5 (W 15)	0 (B 10)	0.5 (B 17)	1 (W 44)	0.5 (W 12)	0.5 (B 84)	0.5 (W 24)	0 (B 13)	0.5 (W 77)	0 (B 38)	5	2698	63.5
74	(Bulgaria) Ivan Cheparinov	2627	0.5 (B 13)	0.5 (W 8)	1 (B 24)	0.5 (W 1)	0.5 (B 15)	0.5 (W 18)	0 (B 12)	0.5 (W 60)	0.5 (B 39)	0 (W 26)	0.5 (B 81)	5	2694	67.5
75	(India) Leon Luke Mendonca	2615	0.5 (W 19)	1 (B 109)	0.5 (W 16)	0.5 (W 8)	0 (B 9)	1 (B 98)	0 (W 17)	0.5 (B 46)	0.5 (W 99)	0.5 (B 63)	0 (W 47)	5	2692	61.5
76	(Ukraine) Andrei Volokitin	2628	0.5 (W 42)	0 (B 16)	1 (B 112)	0.5 (W 45)	0.5 (W 26)	0 (B 19)	0.5 (W 61)	1 (B 113)	0 (W 37)	1 (B 83)	0 (W 41)	5	2679	59
77	(Azerbaijan) Aydin Suleymanli	2602	1 (W 102)	0.5 (W 97)	0.5 (B 12)	0.5 (B 19)	0 (W 36)	0.5 (W 48)	0.5 (B 49)	0.5 (B 69)	0.5 (W 47)	0.5 (B 73)	0 (W 64)	5	2667	58.5
78	(Armenia) Gabriel Sargissian	2626	0.5 (B 8)	0.5 (W 13)	0.5 (B 18)	0 (W 64)	0.5 (B 107)	0.5 (W 81)	0 (W 44)	0.5 (B 110)	1 (W 113)	0 (B 41)	1 (W 111)	5	2660	55.5
79	(Iran) Bardiya Daneshvar	2598	0.5 (W 99)	0 (B 43)	0.5 (W 100)	0.5 (B 47)	0 (W 96)	0 (B 71)	1 (W 111)	0.5 (B 67)	0.5 (W 112)	0.5 (B 98)	1 (W 103)	5	2654	49
80	(Belgium) Daniel Dardha	2624	0.5 (W 17)	0 (B 12)	0.5 (B 67)	0.5 (W 24)	0 (B 66)	0.5 (W 95)	1 (B 108)	1 (W 115)	0.5 (B 48)	0.5 (W 68)	0 (B 40)	5	2652	57.5
81	(India) Divya Deshmukh	2478	0 (W 73)	0.5 (B 59)	0.5 (W 102)	1 (B 101)	0 (W 50)	0.5 (B 78)	1 (W 71)	0.5 (B 41)	0 (W 62)	0.5 (B 70)	0.5 (W 74)	5	2652	53.5
82	(FIDE) Aleksandra Goryachkina	2528	0 (B 28)	0.5 (W 96)	0.5 (B 55)	1 (W 68)	0 (B 24)	0 (W 62)	0.5 (B 104)	1 (W 114)	1 (B 97)	0.5 (W 66)	0 (B 33)	5	2652	53.5
83	(Uzbekistan) Abdimalik Abdisalimov	2488	0 (B 54)	0 (B 101)	0.5 (W 116)	0 (B 71)	1 (W 111)	0.5 (B 102)	1 (W 85)	1 (W 65)	0 (B 26)	0 (W 76)	1 (B 104)	5	2639	50
84	(United States) Levon Aronian	2744	0.5 (W 85)	0.5 (B 93)	1 (W 89)	0.5 (B 86)	0.5 (W 20)	0.5 (B 63)	0.5 (W 73)	0 (B 28)	0 (W 7)	0.5 (W 59)	0.5 (B 72)	5	2634	54.5
85	(Armenia) Haik M. Martirosyan	2628	0.5 (B 84)	0 (W 6)	0.5 (B 108)	0 (B 44)	1 (W 106)	0 (W 115)	0 (B 83)	0.5 (W 105)	0.5 (B 95)	1 (B 113)	1 (W 107)	5	2619	47
86	(United Arab Emirates) Salem Saleh	2640	1 (W 116)	0.5 (B 1)	0.5 (W 42)	0.5 (W 84)	0 (B 13)	0.5 (W 24)	1 (B 38)	0 (B 11)	0 (W 32)	0 (B 61)	0.5 (W 92)	4.5	2676	61.5
87	(Poland) Szymon Gumularz	2590	0.5 (W 20)	1 (B 100)	1 (W 43)	0.5 (B 3)	0.5 (B 14)	0 (W 9)	0.5 (B 18)	0 (W 25)	0 (B 49)	0.5 (W 65)	0 (B 51)	4.5	2673	64.5
88	(Ukraine) Anton Korobov	2616	0.5 (W 23)	0 (B 19)	0.5 (W 47)	0 (B 100)	1 (W 102)	1 (B 67)	0 (W 11)	1 (B 101)	0 (W 46)	0 (B 71)	0.5 (W 98)	4.5	2670	57
89	(Poland) Mateusz Bartel	2581	0.5 (B 49)	1 (W 40)	0 (B 84)	0.5 (W 114)	1 (B 65)	0.5 (W 45)	0.5 (B 25)	0 (W 18)	0 (B 33)	0.5 (W 51)	0 (W 70)	4.5	2666	59
90	(Ukraine) Yuriy Kuzubov	2600	0.5 (B 63)	1 (W 67)	0.5 (B 9)	0 (W 14)	0.5 (B 48)	0 (W 25)	1 (B 114)	0.5 (W 33)	0.5 (B 66)	0 (W 54)	0 (B 65)	4.5	2662	60
91	(FIDE) Evgeniy Najer	2613	0.5 (W 109)	0.5 (B 98)	0.5 (W 46)	0 (B 43)	0.5 (W 93)	1 (B 70)	0.5 (W 47)	0 (B 100)	0.5 (W 102)	0 (B 67)	0.5 (W 96)	4.5	2661	51.5
92	(China) Xu Xiangyu	2615	0.5 (B 112)	0 (W 14)	0 (B 40)	0.5 (B 102)	1 (W 116)	0 (B 47)	0.5 (W 67)	0.5 (B 98)	0.5 (W 101)	0.5 (W 97)	0.5 (B 86)	4.5	2661	51
93	(Spain) Maksim Chigaev	2638	0.5 (B 6)	0.5 (W 84)	0.5 (B 38)	0 (W 18)	0.5 (B 91)	1 (W 107)	1 (B 115)	0.5 (W 45)	0 (B 24)	0 (W 39)	0 (B 60)	4.5	2658	55
94	(FIDE) Maxim Matlakov	2609	0.5 (W 36)	0.5 (B 46)	0.5 (W 20)	0.5 (B 98)	0.5 (W 100)	0.5 (B 43)	0.5 (W 69)	0 (W 40)	0 (B 68)	0.5 (B 96)	0.5 (W 97)	4.5	2659	55
95	(Netherlands) Max Warmerdam	2591	0.5 (B 25)	0.5 (W 48)	0 (B 63)	0.5 (W 49)	0 (B 55)	0.5 (B 80)	0.5 (W 112)	0 (B 70)	0.5 (W 85)	1 (W 114)	0.5 (B 101)	4.5	2651	53.5
96	(France) Etienne Bacrot	2637	0 (W 41)	0.5 (B 82)	0.5 (B 113)	0.5 (W 60)	1 (B 79)	0.5 (W 66)	0 (B 16)	0.5 (W 58)	0 (B 34)	0.5 (W 94)	0.5 (B 91)	4.5	2640	54.5
97	(Israel) Boris Gelfand	2652	1 (W 113)	0.5 (B 77)	0 (W 35)	0.5 (B 21)	0.5 (W 56)	0.5 (B 37)	0.5 (W 39)	0 (B 72)	0 (W 82)	0.5 (B 92)	0.5 (B 94)	4.5	2621	54
98	(Romania) Bogdan-Daniel Deac	2674	0.5 (B 29)	0.5 (W 91)	0.5 (B 103)	0.5 (W 94)	0.5 (B 53)	0 (W 75)	0 (B 30)	0.5 (W 92)	0.5 (B 104)	0.5 (W 79)	0.5 (B 88)	4.5	2617	49.5
99	(FIDE) Vladislav Artemiev	2664	0.5 (B 79)	0.5 (W 34)	0 (B 29)	0.5 (W 30)	0.5 (B 103)	0.5 (W 58)	1 (B 59)	0.5 (W 53)	0.5 (B 75)	0 (W 57)	0 (B 56)	4.5	2615	55.5
100	(Denmark) Jonas Buhl Bjerre	2651	0.5 (B 111)	0 (W 87)	0.5 (B 79)	1 (W 88)	0.5 (B 94)	0 (W 56)	1 (B 103)	1 (W 91)	0 (B 21)	0 (W 34)	0 (B 58)	4.5	2608	50.5
101	(Egypt) Bassem Amin	2636	0 (B 3)	1 (W 83)	0 (B 13)	0 (W 81)	0.5 (B 110)	1 (W 108)	0.5 (B 58)	0 (W 88)	0.5 (B 92)	0.5 (B 111)	0.5 (W 95)	4.5	2602	51.5
102	(India) Karthikeyan Murali	2669	0 (B 77)	0 (W 58)	0.5 (B 81)	0.5 (W 92)	0 (B 88)	0.5 (W 83)	1 (B 105)	1 (W 103)	0.5 (B 91)	0.5 (W 60)	0 (B 59)	4.5	2600	49
103	(Spain) Jaime Santos Latasa	2620	0.5 (W 11)	0.5 (B 23)	0.5 (W 98)	0 (B 36)	0.5 (W 99)	0.5 (B 109)	0 (W 100)	0 (B 102)	0.5 (B 105)	1 (W 115)	0 (B 79)	4	2662	50.5
104	(Germany) Rasmus Svane	2620	0.5 (B 9)	0.5 (W 24)	0 (B 8)	0.5 (W 67)	0 (B 25)	0.5 (B 112)	0.5 (W 82)	0.5 (B 109)	0.5 (W 98)	0.5 (B 107)	0 (W 83)	4	2659	55
105	(Norway) Jon Ludvig Hammer	2618	0.5 (B 18)	0.5 (W 45)	0 (B 2)	0 (W 48)	0 (B 68)	0.5 (B 111)	0 (W 102)	0.5 (B 85)	0.5 (W 103)	1 (W 116)	0.5 (B 106)	4	2647	53.5
106	(Germany) Dennis Wagner	2608	0 (B 64)	0.5 (W 26)	0 (B 33)	0.5 (W 112)	0 (B 85)	1 (W 116)	0 (B 68)	0.5 (W 108)	0.5 (B 114)	0.5 (B 109)	0.5 (W 105)	4	2641	48
107	(Uzbekistan) Mukhiddin Madaminov	2560	0.5 (W 114)	0.5 (B 69)	0.5 (W 50)	0 (B 20)	0.5 (W 78)	0 (B 93)	0.5 (W 70)	0 (B 71)	1 (B 116)	0.5 (W 104)	0 (B 85)	4	2639	51
108	(Uzbekistan) Mukhammadzokhid Suyarov	2482	0 (B 65)	0.5 (B 71)	0.5 (W 85)	0.5 (W 55)	0.5 (B 52)	0 (B 101)	0 (W 80)	0.5 (B 106)	0 (W 111)	1 (B 110)	0.5 (W 112)	4	2630	48.5
109	(Ukraine) Pavel Eljanov	2682	0.5 (B 91)	0 (W 75)	1 (B 62)	0.5 (W 53)	0 (B 21)	0.5 (W 103)	0 (B 52)	0.5 (W 104)	0 (B 59)	0.5 (W 106)	0.5 (B 114)	4	2623	50
110	(Uzbekistan) Jakhongir Vakhidov	2521	0.5 (W 31)	0.5 (B 50)	0 (W 26)	0 (B 70)	0.5 (W 101)	0 (B 59)	1 (B 116)	0.5 (W 78)	0 (B 65)	0 (W 108)	1 (B 115)	4	2614	51.5
111	(Azerbaijan) Mahammad Muradli	2590	0.5 (W 100)	0 (B 114)	0.5 (W 70)	0 (B 69)	0 (B 83)	0.5 (W 105)	0 (B 79)	1 (W 116)	1 (B 108)	0.5 (W 101)	0 (B 78)	4	2604	46.5
112	(Serbia) Alexey Sarana	2686	0.5 (W 92)	0 (B 5)	0 (W 76)	0.5 (B 106)	0.5 (B 115)	0.5 (W 104)	0.5 (B 95)	0.5 (W 59)	0.5 (B 79)	0 (W 38)	0.5 (B 108)	4	2593	49.5
113	(Georgia (country)) Baadur Jobava	2590	0 (B 97)	0.5 (B 70)	0.5 (W 96)	0.5 (W 25)	0.5 (B 62)	0.5 (W 52)	0.5 (B 65)	0 (W 76)	0 (B 78)	0 (W 85)	0.5 (B 116)	3.5	2637	52.5
114	(Spain) Daniil Yuffa	2648	0.5 (B 107)	1 (W 111)	0 (W 41)	0.5 (B 89)	0.5 (W 37)	0 (B 7)	0 (W 90)	0 (B 82)	0.5 (W 106)	0 (B 95)	0.5 (W 109)	3.5	2613	49.5
115	(Uzbekistan) Ortik Nigmatov	2488	0.5 (W 50)	0 (B 44)	1 (W 71)	0 (B 31)	0.5 (W 112)	1 (B 85)	0 (W 93)	0 (B 80)	0 (W 67)	0 (B 103)	0 (W 110)	3	2651	51.5
116	(Nigeria) Tennyson Olisa	2287	0 (B 86)	0 (W 51)	0.5 (B 83)	0 (W 62)	0 (B 92)	0 (B 106)	0 (W 110)	0 (B 111)	0 (W 107)	0 (B 105)	0.5 (W 113)	1	2600	45
