= UzChess Cup =

Chess tournament in Uzbekistan

Tournament information
- Location: Tashkent, Uzbekistan
- Dates: 7–15 June 2026
- Format: 9-round round-robin tournament

Current champion
- (Uzbekistan) Mukhiddin Madaminov (Masters) (Azerbaijan) Mahammad Muradli (Challengers)

UzChess Cup is an annual closed chess tournament, first held in Tashkent, Uzbekistan, from 6 June to 14 June 2024.

== 2024 ==
=== Masters ===
UzChess Cup Masters, 6 June – 14 June 2024, Tashkent, Uzbekistan, Category XIX (2712)
	Player	Rating	1	2	3	4	5	6	7	8	9	10	Points	H2H	SB	TPR
1	Nodirbek Yakubboev (Uzbekistan)	2634		½	½	½	½	½	1	½	½	1	5½	0.5	23.5	2800
2	Nodirbek Abdusattorov (Uzbekistan)	2766	½		1	½	0	½	½	½	1	1	5½	0.5	23.25	2786
3	Yu Yangyi (China)	2715	½	0		1	½	½	½	½	½	1	5	1		2754
4	Alexey Sarana (Serbia)	2712	½	½	0		1	½	½	1	1	0	5	0		2755
5	Javokhir Sindarov (Uzbekistan)	2668	½	1	½	0		½	½	½	½	½	4½	1	20.50	2717
6	Richard Rapport (Romania)	2715	½	½	½	½	½		½	½	½	½	4½	1	20.25	2711
7	Vidit Gujrathi (India)	2721	0	½	½	½	½	½		½	½	1	4½	1	19.00	2711
8	Shakhriyar Mamedyarov (Azerbaijan)	2734	½	½	½	0	½	½	½		½	½	4			2666
9	Alexander Grischuk (FIDE)	2719	½	0	½	0	½	½	½	½		½	3½			2631
10	Parham Maghsoodloo (Iran)	2733	0	0	0	1	½	½	0	½	½		3			2584

=== Challengers ===
UzChess Cup Challengers, 6 June – 14 June 2024, Tashkent, Uzbekistan, Category XV (2616)
	Player	Rating	1	2	3	4	5	6	7	8	9	10	Points	H2H	SB	TPR
1	Shamsiddin Vokhidov (Uzbekistan)	2624		1	½	1	½	½	½	1	½	1	6½			2781
2	Alexandr Predke (Serbia)	2667	0		½	½	1	½	½	1	1	1	6			2736
3	Evgeny Romanov (Norway)	2577	½	½		1	½	½	½	½	1	0	5	1		2664
4	Aleksandar Indjic (Serbia)	2602	0	½	0		½	1	½	1	½	1	5	0		2661
5	Jakhongir Vakhidov (Uzbekistan)	2580	½	0	½	½		½	1	0	1	½	4½	0.5	19.00	2620
6	Maxim Matlakov (FIDE)	2657	½	½	½	0	½		½	0	1	1	4½	0.5	19.00	2612
7	Alexander Donchenko (Germany)	2639	½	½	½	½	0	½		½	½	½	4			2571
8	Aydin Suleymanli (Azerbaijan)	2626	0	0	½	0	1	1	½		½	0	3½			2535
9	Mustafa Yilmaz (Turkey)	2601	½	0	0	½	0	0	½	½		1	3	1		2493
10	Abhijeet Gupta (India)	2589	0	0	1	0	½	0	½	1	0		3	0		2494

=== Futures ===
UzChess Cup Futures, 6 June – 14 June 2024, Tashkent, Uzbekistan, Category XI (2520)
	Player	Rating	1	2	3	4	5	6	7	8	9	10	Points	H2H	SB	TPR
1	GM Vitaly Sivuk (Sweden)	2569		½	1	½	0	½	1	1	1	½	6	0.5	24.75	2640
2	GM Bardiya Daneshvar (Iran)	2611	½		½	0	1	½	½	1	1	1	6	0.5	23.25	2635
3	IM Saidakbar Saydaliev (Uzbekistan)	2448	0	½		1	½	1	1	0	½	1	5½	1		2608
4	IM Mukhammadzokhid Suyarov (Uzbekistan)	2430	½	1	0		½	0	1	1	1	½	5½	0		2610
5	IM Mukhiddin Madaminov (Uzbekistan)	2517	1	0	½	½		½	½	½	½	1	5	0.5	21.00	2563
6	GM Vugar Rasulov (Azerbaijan)	2557	½	½	0	1	½		0	1	½	1	5	0.5	20.75	2559
7	GM Vitaliy Bernadskiy (Ukraine)	2563	0	½	0	0	½	1		1	½	½	4			2472
8	GM Mihail Nikitenko (Belarus)	2525	0	0	1	0	½	0	0		1	1	3½			2440
9	GM Sergei Tiviakov (Netherlands)	2552	0	0	½	0	½	½	½	0		½	2½			2351
10	IM Khumoyun Begmuratov (Uzbekistan)	2429	½	0	0	½	0	0	½	0	½		2			2310

== 2025 ==
=== Masters ===
UzChess Cup Masters, 19 June – 27 June 2025, Tashkent, Uzbekistan
	Player	Rating	1	2	3	4	5	6	7	8	9	10	Points	H2H	SB	TPR
1	R Praggnanandhaa (India)	2767		1	1	1	0	0	½	1	½	½	5.5	2	25.25	2799
2	Nodirbek Abdusattorov (Uzbekistan)	2767	0		½	½	1	1	0	1	½	1	5.5	0.5	22.50	2799
3	Javokhir Sindarov (Uzbekistan)	2710	0	½		½	½	1	½	½	1	1	5.5	0.5	22.25	2806
4	Arjun Erigaisi (India)	2782	0	½	½		½	½	1	1	½	½	5		21.50	2761
5	Parham Maghsoodloo (Iran)	2691	1	0	½	½		½	1	0	½	½	4.5	1.5	20.50	2728
6	Richard Rapport (Hungary)	2714	1	0	0	½	½		½	½	½	1	4.5	1	18.75	2731
7	Nodirbek Yakubboev (Uzbekistan)	2659	½	1	½	0	0	½		½	½	1	4.5	0.5	19.50	2725
8	Shamsiddin Vokhidov (Uzbekistan)	2644	0	0	½	0	1	½	½		1	½	4		16.50	2690
9	Ian Nepomniachtchi (FIDE)	2757	½	½	0	½	½	½	½	0		½	3.5		16.00	2640
10	Aravindh Chithambaram (India)	2749	½	0	0	½	½	0	0	½	½		2.5		11.25	2555

Tiebreaker 1
	Player	Ratings	1	2	3	Points
1	Nodirbek Abdusattorov (Uzbekistan)	2767		½ ½	0 1	2
2	Javokhir Sindarov (Uzbekistan)	2710	½ ½		1 0	2
3	R Praggnanandhaa (India)	2767	1 0	0 1		2

Tiebreaker 2
	Player	Ratings	1	2	3	Points
1	R Praggnanandhaa (India)	2767		1	½	1.5
2	Javokhir Sindarov (Uzbekistan)	2710	0		1	1
3	Nodirbek Abdusattorov (Uzbekistan)	2767	½	0		0.5

=== Challengers ===
UzChess Cup Challengers, 19 June – 27 June 2025, Tashkent, Uzbekistan
	Player	Rating	1	2	3	4	5	6	7	8	9	10	Points	H2H	SB	TPR
1	GM Nikolas Theodorou (Greece)	2613		1	1	0	½	1	1	½	½	1	6.5		27.50	2711
2	GM Mukhiddin Madaminov (Uzbekistan)	2536	0		½	½	1	1	½	1	½	1	6		23.50	2679
3	GM Vitaly Sivuk (Sweden)	2522	0	½		1	½	½	½	½	1	1	5.5	1	22.00	2635
4	GM Vasily Ivanchuk (Ukraine)	2634	1	½	0		1	½	1	½	1	0	5.5	0	24.75	2623
5	GM Andrew Hong (United States)	2589	½	0	½	0		0	1	1	½	1	4.5		17.50	2548
6	GM Ma Qun (China)	2630	0	0	½	½	1		½	½	½	½	4	0.5	16.50	2500
7	IM Mukhammadzokhid Suyarov (Uzbekistan)	2490	0	½	½	0	0	½		1	½	1	4	0.5	15.25	2516
8	GM Nijat Abasov (Azerbaijan)	2594	½	0	½	½	0	½	0		1	½	3.5		15.00	2467
9	IM Gulrukhbegim Tokhirjonova (Uzbekistan)	2370	½	½	0	0	½	½	½	0		½	3		13.75	2447
10	GM Jakhongir Vakhidov (Uzbekistan)	2539	0	0	0	1	0	½	0	½	½		2.5		10.75	2387

=== Futures ===
UzChess Cup Futures, 19 June – 27 June 2025, Tashkent, Uzbekistan
	Player	Rating	1	2	3	4	5	6	7	8	9	10	Points	H2H	SB	TPR
1	GM Saparmyrat Atabayev (Turkmenistan)	2490		0	½	½	½	1	½	1	1	1	6		24.25	2627
2	GM Ortik Nigmatov (Uzbekistan)	2474	1		1	1	0	0	½	1	0	1	5.5		25.00	2586
3	GM Evgeny Alekseev (Israel)	2513	½	0		½	½	1	1	½	½	½	5	0.5	21.50	2544
4	GM Klementy Sychev (FIDE)	2513	½	0	½		1	½	½	½	1	½	5	0.5	21.25	2544
5	IM Saidakbar Saydaliev (Uzbekistan)	2450	½	1	½	0		½	0	1	½	½	4.5	0.5	20.50	2508
6	GM Boris Chatalbashev (Denmark)	2489	0	1	0	½	½		½	½	1	½	4.5	0.5	19.25	2504
7	IM Khumoyun Begmuratov (Uzbekistan)	2470	½	½	0	½	1	½		½	0	½	4	0.5	18.50	2463
8	GM Alan Pichot (Spain)	2588	0	0	½	½	0	½	½		1	1	4	0.5	15.75	2450
9	GM Abdimalik Abdisalimov (Uzbekistan)	2490	0	1	½	0	½	0	1	0		½	3.5		15.75	2424
10	GM Róbert Ruck (Hungary)	2515	0	0	½	½	½	½	½	0	½		3		13.25	2376

== 2026 ==
=== Masters ===
Javokhir Sindarov was originally set to participate in the event, but he ultimately withdrew. Mukhiddin Madaminov was added as his replacement.

UzChess Cup Masters, 7 June – 15 June 2026, Tashkent, Uzbekistan, Category XVIII (2698.4)
	Player	Rating	1	2	3	4	5	6	7	8	9	10	Points	H2H	SB	TPR
1	Shamsiddin Vokhidov (Uzbekistan)	2637		1	1	½	½	½	0	½	½	1	5½	1	24.50	2785
2	Mukhiddin Madaminov (Uzbekistan)	2586	0		1	1	½	½	½	0	1	1	5½	0	23.25	2791
3	Ian Nepomniachtchi (FIDE)	2733	0	0		½	1	½	1	½	1	½	5	1½	20.75	2738
4	Shakhriyar Mamedyarov (Azerbaijan)	2717	½	0	½		½	0	½	1	1	1	5	1	20.25	2739
5	Arjun Erigaisi (India)	2761	½	½	0	½		½	½	1	½	1	5	½	21.00	2734
6	Nodirbek Abdusattorov (Uzbekistan)	2777	½	½	½	1	½		½	½	½	0	4½		21.25	2690
7	Hans Niemann (United States)	2742	1	½	0	½	½	½		½	½	0	4	½	19.25	2651
8	Nodirbek Yakubboev (Uzbekistan)	2689	½	1	½	0	0	½	½		½	½	4	½	18.25	2656
9	Vidit Gujrathi (India)	2708	½	0	0	0	½	½	½	½		1	3½		14.50	2617
10	Nikolas Theodorou (Greece)	2634	0	0	½	0	0	1	1	½	0		3		13.00	2581

Tiebreaker
	Player	Ratings	1	2	Points
1	Mukhiddin Madaminov (Uzbekistan)	2586	1	1	2
2	Shamsiddin Vokhidov (Uzbekistan)	2637	0	0	0

=== Challengers ===
UzChess Cup Challengers, 8 June – 15 June 2026, Tashkent, Uzbekistan, Category XIV (2580)
	Player	Rating	1	2	3	4	5	6	7	8	9	10	Points	H2H	SB	TPR
1	GM Mahammad Muradli (Azerbaijan)	2617		½	1	1	1	1	1	1	½	½	7½		32.00	2849
2	GM Aditya Mittal (India)	2599	½		0	1	1	½	½	0	1	1	5½		22.50	2658
3	GM Bogdan-Daniel Deac (Romania)	2656	0	1		½	½	½	½	½	½	1	5		20.25	2615
4	IM Mukhammadzokhid Suyarov (Uzbekistan)	2551	0	0	½		1	½	0	½	1	1	4½	1½	16.75	2583
5	GM Brandon Jacobson (United States)	2604	0	0	½	0		1	1	0	1	1	4½	1	16.50	2577
6	GM Yuriy Kuzubov (Ukraine)	2607	0	½	½	½	0		1	½	½	1	4½	½	17.50	2577
7	GM Abdimalik Abdisalimov (Uzbekistan)	2528	0	½	½	1	0	0		1	½	½	4	1	16.50	2543
8	GM Saparmyrat Atabayev (Turkmenistan)	2479	0	1	½	½	1	½	0		0	½	4	0	18.25	2548
9	GM Eltaj Safarli (Azerbaijan)	2648	½	0	½	0	0	½	½	1		0	3		14.50	2447
10	GM Jakhongir Vakhidov (Uzbekistan)	2511	½	0	0	0	0	0	½	½	1		2½		10.75	2422

=== Futures ===
UzChess Cup Futures, 8 June – 15 June 2026, Tashkent, Uzbekistan, Category X (2494.8)
	Player	Rating	1	2	3	4	5	6	7	8	9	10	Points	H2H	SB	TPR
1	IM Khumoyun Begmuratov (Uzbekistan)	2512		½	1	1	0	1	1	½	1	1	7		28.50	2713
2	GM Rinat Jumabayev (Kazakhstan)	2556	½		½	½	½	1	1	½	1	1	6½		25.50	2654
3	GM S. P. Sethuraman (India)	2551	0	½		½	1	½	½	1	1	½	5½	½	21.75	2569
4	GM Sergei Tiviakov (Netherlands)	2524	0	½	½		½	1	1	½	½	1	5½	½	21.00	2572
5	GM Alan Pichot (Spain)	2581	1	½	0	½		½	½	½	½	½	4½		21.00	2485
6	GM Igor Lysyj (FIDE)	2533	0	0	½	0	½		1	½	½	½	3½	1½	13.00	2411
7	GM Ortik Nigmatov (Uzbekistan)	2458	0	0	½	0	½	0		1	½	1	3½	1	12.50	2419
8	GM Li Min Peng (Switzerland)	2541	½	½	0	½	½	½	0		½	½	3½	½	16.25	2410
9	IM Bakhrom Bakhrillaev (Uzbekistan)	2443	0	0	0	½	½	½	½	½		½	3		11.50	2376
10	FM Bekhruz Umarov (Uzbekistan)	2249	0	0	½	0	½	½	0	½	½		2½		10.00	2356
