= Nikolas Theodorou =

Greek chess grandmaster (born 2000)

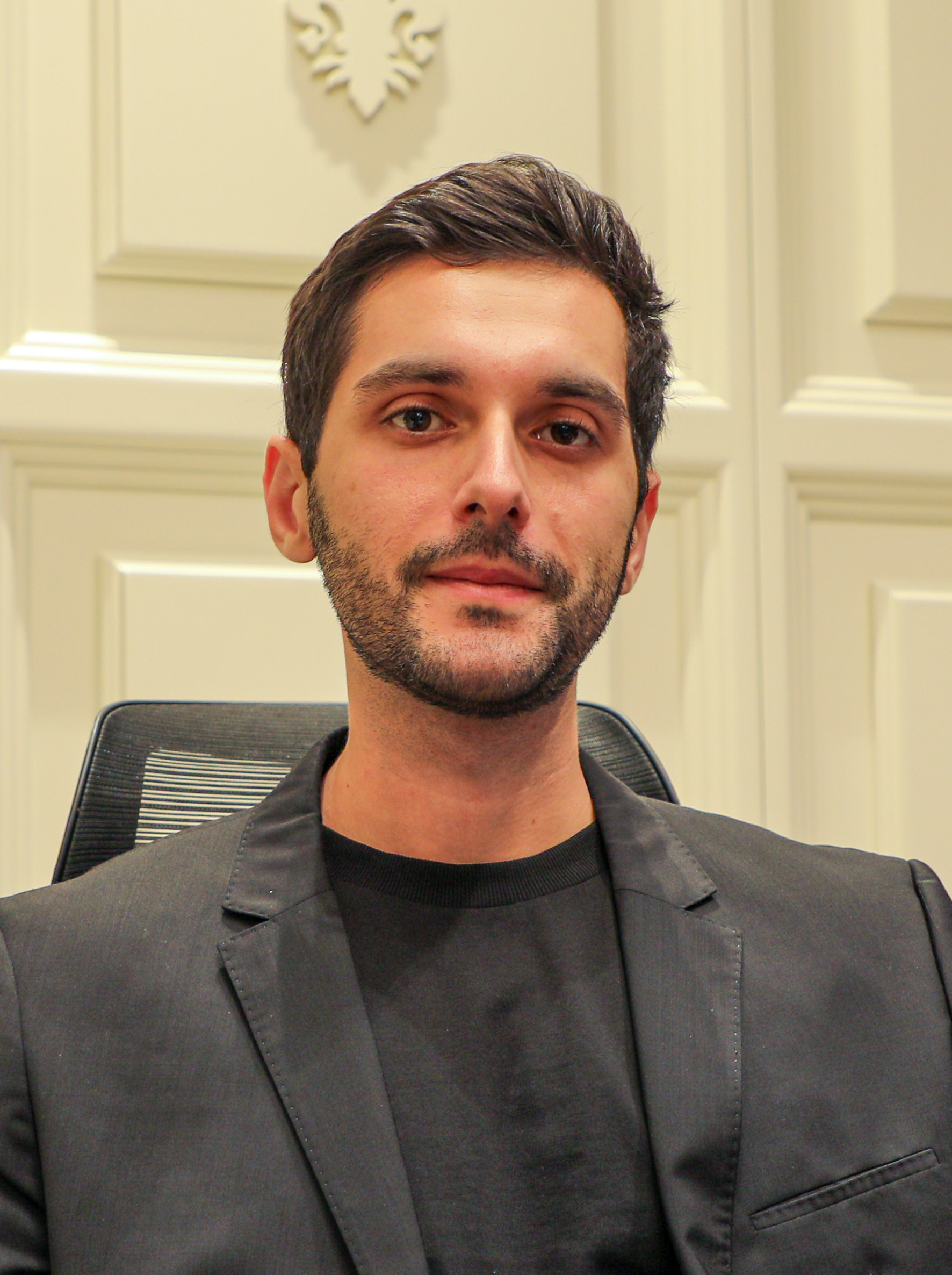
- Nikolas Theodorou in 2026

Personal information
- Born: 17 September 2000 (age 26) Athens, Greece

Chess career
- Country: Greece
- Title: Grandmaster (2021)
- FIDE rating: 2639 (October 2026)
- Peak rating: 2656 (November 2025)
- Ranking: No. 79 (October 2026)
- Peak ranking: No. 60 (November 2025)

Nikolas Theodorou (Greek: Νικόλας Θεοδώρου; born 17 September 2000) is a Greek chess player who has held the title of Grandmaster since 2021. He is a Chess Olympiad individual silver medal winner (in 2022).

== Early life ==
Nikolas Theodorou was born in Athens in 2000. In 2006, his family moved to Atsipopoulo in Rethymno for business reasons. He grew up there, where he finished elementary school.

In Rethymnon, Theodorou attended high school. He was an excellent student and in 2018 he graduated from the Experimental High School of Rethymnon.

== Chess career ==
From a very young age, since 2007, Theodorou started chess lessons at the Chess Club of Rethymno. Since 2015 he has been a student of the Chania Chess Academy.

Theodorou has taken part in many pan-Hellenic and international chess tournaments. In 2022, with the chess team of the Saint Louis University, he achieved first place in the Final Four of the USA Collegiate Chess.

Theodorou played for Greece in the European Team Chess Championship:

- In 2017, at third board in the 21st European Team Chess Championship in Hersonissos (+3, =1, -3).
- In 2023, at first board in the 24th European Team Chess Championship in Budva (+3, =3, -2).
- In 2025, at first board in the 25th European Team Chess Championship in Batumi (+2, =6, -1).

Theodorou played for Greece in the Chess Olympiad:

- In 2022, at second board in the 44th Chess Olympiad in Chennai (+6, =3, -0) and won individual silver medal.
- In 2024, at first board in the 45th Chess Olympiad in Budapest (+4, =7, -0).
- In 2026, at first board in the 46th Chess Olympiad in Samarkand (+4, =5, -1).

In 2016, he was awarded the FIDE International Master (IM) title and received the FIDE Grandmaster (GM) title five years later.

In May 2022, Nikolas Theodorou received his bachelor's degree with a double major in Physics and Mathematics, from Saint Louis University in the USA. In August 2024, he received a master's degree in the Biostatistics & Health Analytics program at the same university and had a renewed full scholarship to continue his participation in the university chess team.

In August 2024, he won the Riga Technical University Open "A" tournament.

In June 2025, he won that year's edition of the UzChess Cup Challengers section. In July 2025, he won the Biel Challengers. In August 2025, he entered the FIDE World Top 100 for the first time in his career. He defeated Gukesh Dommaraju, the reigning world chess champion in the 6th round of the Grand Swiss 2025 in September of the same year.
