= Ihor Samunenkov =

Ukrainian chess grandmaster (born 2009)

Ihor Samunenkov Ігор Самуненков
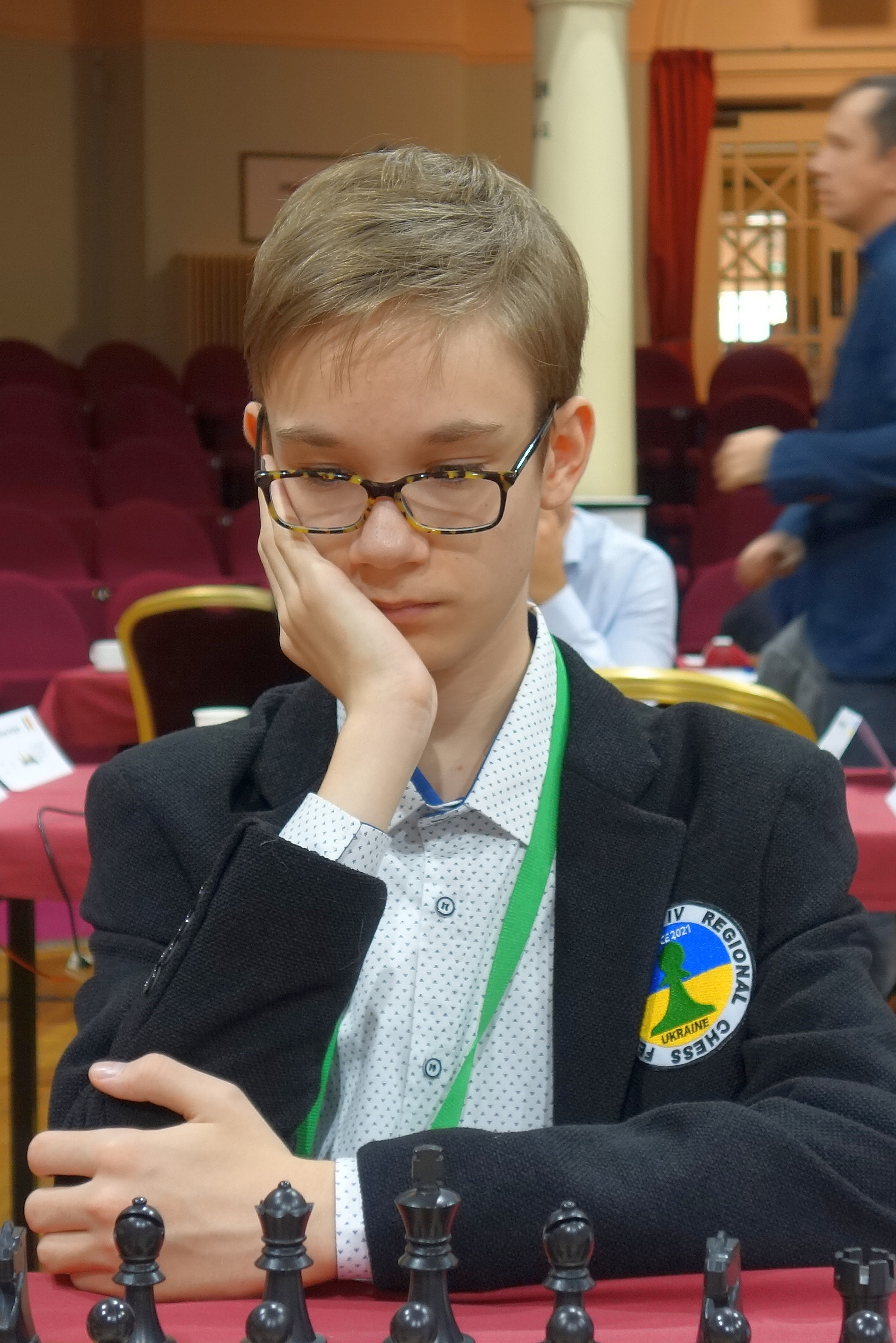
- Samunenkov in 2023

Personal information
- Born: Ihor Eduardovych Samunenkov; June 15, 2009 (age 17) Kyiv, Ukraine

Chess career
- Country: Ukraine
- Title: Grandmaster (2023)
- FIDE rating: 2607 (October 2026)
- Peak rating: 2616 (July 2026)

Ihor Eduardovych Samunenkov (Ukrainian: Ігор Едуардович Самуненков, born June 15, 2009) is a Ukrainian chess grandmaster. A chess prodigy, he was awarded the title of Grandmaster at the age of 14, making him one of the world's youngest grandmasters.

== Early life ==
Samunenkov was born on June 15, 2009 in Kyiv, Ukraine. He has been playing chess professionally since the age of 8.

== Chess career ==
World Cadets Rapid Chess Championship (2019): Competed in the Under 10 section.

Kyiv Chess Open (2021): A significant event where young talents like Samunenkov showcased their skills.

Rudaga - Kaissa (2021): An online tournament where he faced international competitors.

Riga Technical University Open (2021): open tournament, which attracts a mix of amateur and professional players.

Ukraine Chess Championship (2021): Competed in the Boys - 18 category and also in the rapid.

50th Anniversary of Mariupol Chess Club Open (2021): A commemorative tournament with a notable prize fund.

In December 2021, Samunenkov won the U12 World Youth Chess Championship tournament by defeating the world's youngest grandmaster Abhimanyu Mishra. That same month, he participated in the World Rapid and Blitz Chess Tournaments, and was the youngest player in the events. He finished 89th and 128th in fields of 176 and 179 players, respectively.

In October 2022, Samunenkov finished 11th (and was a prize winner) in a field of 30 players in the Anfield Cup held in Kyiv.

Samunenkov was invited to participate as a wild card in the FIDE Grand Swiss Tournament 2023. He got his only win of the event against Michał Krasenkow in the sixth round.

In December 2023, Samunenkov was formally awarded the Grandmaster title after having completed all the requirements earlier on September 26. Upon this, he became the world's youngest grandmaster and remained as such until Andy Woodward, who fulfilled the Grandmaster requirements on January 30, 2024, was awarded the title in April 2024.

== Notable games ==
Against Wellington S Albuquerque Junior (2024): Samunenkov showcased his skill in the Sicilian Defense, Open, Classical Variation, securing a win in 35 moves.

Versus Artem Bardyk (2024): In a Queen’s Pawn Opening, Chigorin Variation, he won after an intense 75 moves.

Playing Artin Ashraf (2024): He triumphed in the Queen’s Indian Defense, Fianchetto, Nimzowitsch Variation, Nimzowitsch Attack in just 40 moves.

Match with Aryan Tari (2024): Samunenkov won using the French Defense, St. George Defense, in 48 moves.

Game against Rasmus Svane (2024): He successfully played the Queen’s Gambit Declined, Catalan Opening, and won in 71 moves.

Match against Harsh Suresh Abu Dhabi Chess Festival (2024: A brilliant 23 move miniature.
