= Mukhammadzokhid Suyarov =

Uzbekistani chess grandmaster (born 2009)

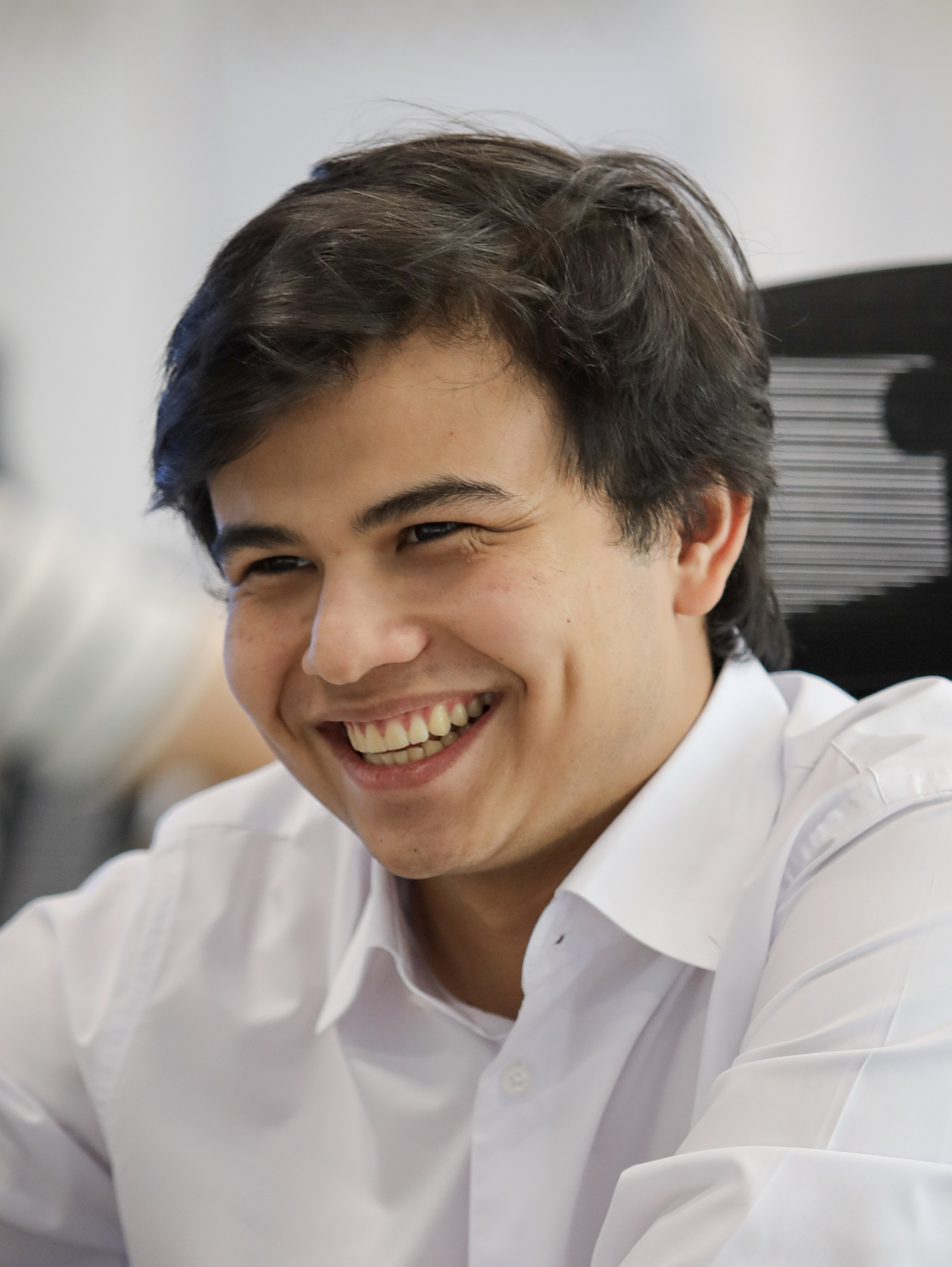
- Suyarov in 2026

Personal information
- Born: 2009 (age 16–17) Tashkent, Uzbekistan

Chess career
- Country: Uzbekistan
- Title: Grandmaster (2026)
- FIDE rating: 2540 (September 2026)
- Peak rating: 2555 (July 2026)

Mukhammadzokhid Suyarov (Uzbek: Мукҳаммадзокҳид Суяров) is an Uzbekistani chess grandmaster.

== Career ==
In June 2024, he finished 4th in the UzChess Cup Futures, during which he defeated four grandmasters: Bardiya Daneshvar, Vitaliy Bernadskiy, Mihail Nikitenko, and Sergei Tiviakov.

In November 2024, he played in the President Cup in Uzbekistan, where his draw against Vantika Agrawal was mistakenly counted as a win for him by the arbiters, leading to Agrawal's withdrawal from the tournament. The result was later corrected.

In February 2025, he finished in third place at the Chessable Masters Qualifier.

In April 2025, he qualified for the Chess World Cup 2025 through finishing in fourth place at the Asian Regional Championship. At the World Cup, he was defeated by Nijat Abasov in the first round.

In April 2026, he won the Grenke Chess Open on tiebreaks.
