= Nodirbek Abdusattorov =

Uzbekistani chess grandmaster (born 2004)

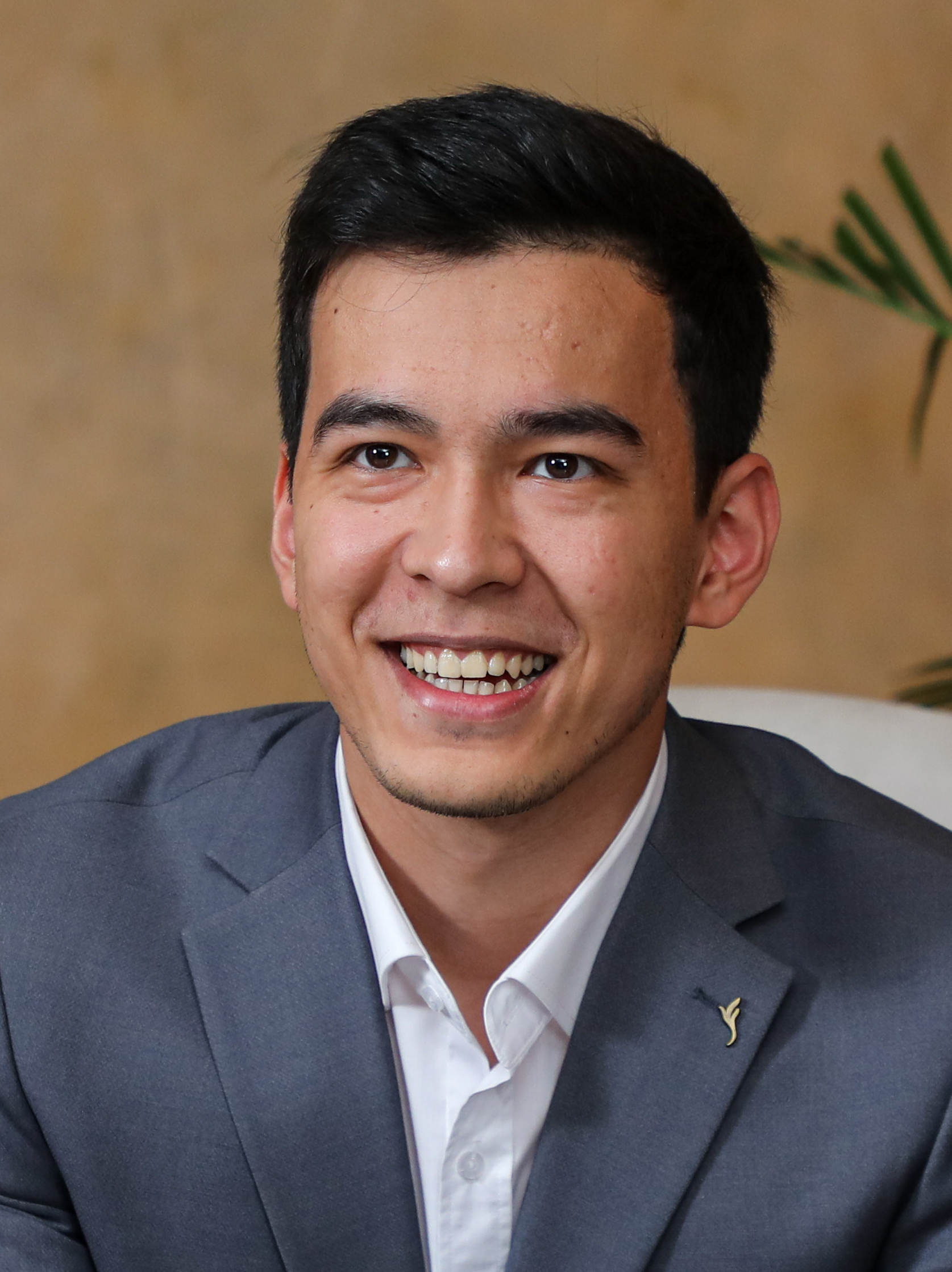
- Abdusattorov in 2026

Personal information
- Born: 18 September 2004 (age 22) Tashkent, Uzbekistan

Chess career
- Country: Uzbekistan
- Title: Grandmaster (2018)
- FIDE rating: 2772 (November 2026)
- Peak rating: 2783 (October 2024)
- Ranking: No. 5 (November 2026)
- Peak ranking: No. 4 (April 2024)

Nodirbek Abdusattorov (Uzbek: Нодирбек Абдусатторов; born 18 September 2004) is an Uzbek chess grandmaster. He qualified for the grandmaster title at the age of 13, Abdusattorov won the World Rapid Chess Championship 2021, becoming the youngest ever World Rapid Champion at 17 years and 3 months, and the youngest ever open world chess champion in any time format, breaking the record previously held by Magnus Carlsen, who won the 2009 World Blitz Chess Championship at age 18.

Abdusattorov played top board for Uzbekistan at the 2022, 2024 and 2026 Chess Olympiads. In 2022, Uzbekistan won gold and he won the individual silver medal. In 2024, Uzbekistan won bronze and Abdusattorov repeated silver. In 2026, Uzbekistan won gold and Abdusattorov won individual gold. Abdusattorov also holds the record for the youngest player to attain a rating of over 2400. In April 2024, he was ranked fourth in the world. As of October 2026, he is Uzbekistan's second highest-rated grandmaster and among the world's leading chess players.

== Chess career ==
=== Early chess career ===
In 2012, Abdusattorov won the Under 8 division of the World Youth Chess Championships in Maribor, Slovenia. In 2014, at nine years old, he beat two grandmasters, Andrey Zhigalko and Rustam Khusnutdinov, in the 8th Georgy Agzamov Memorial tournament, held in his home city of Tashkent. On 27 June 2020, Abdusattorov placed 2nd–6th in the 1st Mukhtar Ismagambetov Memorial along with Shakhriyar Mamedyarov, Dmitriy Bocharov, Kazybek Nogerbek, and Davit Maghalashvili, with a score of 8½/11. In the FIDE rating list of May 2015, he set a new record for the youngest player to enter the top 100 juniors, at eleven years old.

=== 2021 ===
Abdusattorov qualified for the Chess World Cup 2021 where, ranked 69th, after receiving a walkover in the first round, he defeated Aravindh Chithambaram 1½–½ in the second round and beat fourth seed Anish Giri 3–1 in tiebreaks of the third round before losing to Vasif Durarbayli 4–2 in the 4th round.

In September 2021, Abdusattorov took second place (behind Anish Giri) at the Tolstoy Cup tournament organized by the State Leo Tolstoy Museum-Estate "Yasnaya Polyana" and the Chess Federation of Russia.

In December 2021, Abdusattorov won the El Llobregat Open held in Spain with a score of 7/9.

He followed that up with another open tournament victory in Spain, winning the Sitges Open, held from 13 to 23 December, with a score of 8/10 and edging out Ivan Cheparinov and Dmitrij Kollars in blitz tiebreaks for first place.

In December 2021, Abdusattorov took part in the 2021 FIDE World Rapid Championship, achieving a preliminary score of 9½/13 in a four-way tie for first place, while defeating among others the reigning world chess champion Magnus Carlsen and Fabiano Caruana. With a subsequent win of 1½/2 over Ian Nepomniachtchi in the tie-breaks, Abdusattorov won the Rapid Championship and became the youngest Rapid World Champion in history and the youngest world champion overall in any of the three recognized time control formats.

=== 2022 ===
In May 2022, he won Sharjah Masters with a 2834 performance rating.

In August, he played board 1 for Uzbekistan at the 44th Chess Olympiad in Chennai, where his team won gold on tiebreaks after winning 8 matches and drawing 3 for a score of 19 (tied with Armenia). He won an individual silver medal for his board 1 performance (+7−1=3) (Note: 7 wins, 1 loss and 3 draws. This includes: 7 wins against Purushottam Chaulagain (1975), GM Helgi Dam Ziska (2549), GM Matej Sebenik (2512), GM Fabiano Caruana (2783), GM Jergus Pechac (2594), GM Emilio Cordova (2549), and GM Gukesh D (2684); 1 loss against GM Pentala Harikrishna (2720) in round 6; 3 draws against GM Vincent Keymer (2686), GM Gabriel Sargissian (2698) and GM Anish Giri (2760). The numbers in brackets represent the opponent's elo rating.) behind Gukesh Dommaraju and had a tournament performance rating of 2803.

Abdusattorov refused to attend the World Team Chess Championship in 2022, citing a principle not to play in Israel.

=== 2023 ===
In January 2023, Abdusattorov participated in the Tata Steel tournament, in which he tied for second with Magnus Carlsen with a score of 8/13 (+4−1=8). Going into the last round he topped the table, but was overtaken by Anish Giri.

In the Chess World Cup 2023, Abdusattorov was defeated by Vahap Şanal in the second round. After drawing the first game with the black pieces, he lost the second game with white.

In May 2023, Abdusattorov took part in Norway Chess 2023, in which he won the blitz event with a score of 6/9, a half point above Alireza Firouzja and Shakhriyar Mamedyarov. In the classical event, he scored poorly with a score of 9/27, finishing in ninth place. The classical event was won by Hikaru Nakamura.

In October, he took part in the Qatar Masters Open 2023 where he achieved a score of 7/9 (+5−0=4), tying for first with countryman Nodirbek Yakubboev. He lost the blitz tiebreaks 2–0 to finish in second place.

=== 2024 ===
In January, he took part in the Tata Steel tournament where he tied 1st with 8½/13 alongside Anish Giri, Gukesh D and Wei Yi, before being eliminated in the tiebreak semifinals by the latter. In February & March 2024, Abdusattorov played in the Prague International Chess Festival. He finished with a score of 6½/9, winning the event with a round to spare and a TPR of 2873. This result propelled him to World No.4, with a rating of 2765.

In April–May, Abdusattorov took part in and won the TePe Sigeman Tournament, in which he tied first with 4½/7 (+3−1=3) with Arjun Erigaisi and Peter Svidler, before winning the tournament in blitz tiebreaks.

In May, he participated in the GCT Superbet Poland Rapid & Blitz. In Rapid, he finished in 7th with 8/18 (Rapid wins counted as 2, draws 1). In Blitz, he finished in 5th with 9½/18, for an overall 6th place placement with 17½/36.

In June, Abdusattorov participated in the inaugural UzChess Cup Masters, finishing second behind Nodirbek Yakubboev on tiebreaks. He scored 5½/9 (+3-1=5).

In September, Abdusattorov was part of the Uzbek team that won bronze in the open section of the 45th Chess Olympiad, he won individual silver on board 1 with the performance rating of 2884 and score 9/11 (+7–0=4) following Gukesh Dommaraju who had a performance rating of 3056.

=== 2025 ===
In Tata Steel Chess Tournament 2025, he finished 3rd, scoring 8 points (+4-1=8), behind R Praggnanandhaa and Gukesh Dommaraju.

In August, Abdusattorov played in the Sinquefield Cup. This was arguably one of the worst events of his career, as he finished dead last with a score of 2½/9 (+1-5=3).

In December, he rebounded and won the London Chess Classic with a round to spare. He scored of 7½/9 (+6-0=3).

Abdusattorov finished as the runner-up at the World Blitz Chess Championship 2025. He finished 4th in the Swiss stage with a score of 13/19, advancing to the knockout stage. He defeated Arjun Erigaisi in the semifinal, before losing to Magnus Carlsen in the final.

=== 2026 ===
In January, he took part in Tata Steel Chess Tournament 2026 where he emerged as the winner of the Masters section. He scored 9/13 (+6-1=6).

In March, he took part in the Masters section of the 2026 Prague International Chess Festival. Abdusattorov won the tournament, with the score 6/9 (+3-0=6).

In September 2026, Abdusattorov represented Uzbekistan on Board 1 at the 46th Chess Olympiad held on home soil in Samarkand. He led the national team to their second team gold medal in history, as Uzbekistan secured first place with 20/22 match points. Abdusattorov played in all 11 rounds, remaining undefeated with a score of 8½/11 (+6−0=5) and achieving a tournament performance rating (TPR) of 2869. This performance earned him the individual gold medal on Board 1.
