= Mukhiddin Madaminov =

Uzbekistani chess grandmaster (born 2006)

- Madaminov at the 46th Chess Olympiad

Personal information
- Born: 2 November 2006 (age 19)

Chess career
- Country: Uzbekistan
- Title: Grandmaster (2024)
- FIDE rating: 2611 (September 2026)
- Peak rating: 2612 (October 2026)

Mukhiddin Madaminov (Uzbek: Muhiddin Madaminov; born 2 November 2006) is an Uzbek chess grandmaster.

== Chess career ==
Madaminov was born on 2 November 2006. He became a FIDE master in 2019, an international master in 2022, and a grandmaster in 2024.

During the eighth round of the World Rapid Chess Championship 2023, as black, he checkmated Surya Shekhar Ganguly in eight moves in a Scotch Game that ended in a scholar's mate pattern. This was a rare instance of such a checkmate occurring in a master-level game.

Scotch Game (ECO C45)
1.e4 e5 2.Nf3 Nc6 3.d4 exd4 4.Nxd4 Qf6 5.Nf3 Bb4+ 6.c3 Bc5 7.Bd3 Ne5 8.Nxe5 Qxf2# 0–1
Ganguly vs. Madaminov
World Rapid Chess Championship 2023

Position: h1 white rook, e1 white king, d1 white queen, c1 white bishop, b1 white knight, a1 white rook, h2 white pawn, g2 white pawn, f2 black queen, b2 white pawn, a2 white pawn, d3 white bishop, c3 white pawn, e4 white pawn, e5 white knight, c5 black bishop, h7 black pawn, g7 black pawn, f7 black pawn, d7 black pawn, c7 black pawn, b7 black pawn, a7 black pawn, h8 black rook, g8 black knight, e8 black king, c8 black bishop, a8 black rook

Ending position

In July 2024, he tied for first place with Rinat Jumabayev, Leon Luke Mendonca, and Ayush Sharma in the Master Tournament MTO section of the Biel Chess Festival, placing fourth on tiebreaks.

In February 2025, he won the Al-beruniy Masters with 6½/9. In June 2025, he finished second in the UzChess Cup challengers with 6/9.

During the 2025 Chess World Cup and Candidates Tournament 2026, he was the second of Javokhir Sindarov, who eventually won both the tournaments.

In June 2026, he entered the UzChess Cup Masters as a replacement of Javokhir Sindarov, and was the lowest seed by rating. He tied for first place with Shamsiddin Vokhidov, scoring 5.5/9 points with a 2791 performance rating and defeated supergrandmasters Ian Nepomniachtchi, Shakhriyar Mamedyarov and Vidit Gujrathi. He subsequently won 2–0 vs Vokhidov in blitz playoffs and won the tournament. This result allowed Madaminov to cross the 2600 rating threshold for the first time.
