= Shamsiddin Vokhidov =

Uzbekistani chess grandmaster (born 2002)

- Vokhidov at the 46th Chess Olympiad

Personal information
- Born: January 11, 2002 (age 24)

Chess career
- Country: Uzbekistan
- Title: Grandmaster (2020)
- FIDE rating: 2654 (September 2026)
- Peak rating: 2681 (November 2024)
- Ranking: No. 61 (September 2026)
- Peak ranking: No. 47 (December 2024)

Shamsiddin Vokhidov (Uzbek: Shamsiddin Vohidov) is an Uzbek chess grandmaster.

Vokhidov won the U14 World Youth Chess Championship in 2015.

At the age of 16, Vokhidov defeated world champion Magnus Carlsen at the 2018 World Rapid Chess Championship.

Vokhidov won the Asian Hybrid Championship in May 2021, qualifying for the Chess World Cup 2021. He defeated Luka Paichadze in the first round, but was defeated by Sergey Karjakin in the second round.

In 2023 in Almaty he won the Asian Chess Championship.

In June 2026, Vokhidov tied for first place with Mukhiddin Madaminov at the UzChess Cup Masters, but lost 2–0 in the blitz playoffs to finish runner-up.
