= Ortik Nigmatov =

Uzbekistani chess grandmaster (born 2000)

- Nigmatov at the 46th Chess Olympiad

Personal information
- Born: October 3, 2000 (age 25) Tashkent, Uzbekistan

Chess career
- Country: Uzbekistan
- Title: Grandmaster (2025)
- FIDE rating: 2484 (September 2026)
- Peak rating: 2505 (February 2025)

Ortik Nigmatov is an Uzbek chess grandmaster.

== Chess career ==
He earned his GM norms at the:

- Georgy Agzamov Memorial in April 2018
- Western Asia Junior Championship in November 2018
- Nakhchivan Open in May 2019

In April 2022, he won the Gujarat International GM Open after drawing against Neelotpal Das in the final round.

In November 2022, he played for Uzbekistan in the World Team Chess Championship, where the team finished second overall after losing to China in the gold medal playoff.

In February 2025, he surpassed the 2500 rating mark required for the Grandmaster title after his results at the 3rd International President Cup, Qatar Masters, and Muscat International Chess Championship were all counted. He was formally awarded the title afterwards.

In April 2025, he finished in second place in the Uzbekistani Chess Championship after losing to Nodirbek Yakubboev in the finale.
