= Abdimalik Abdisalimov =

Uzbekistani chess grandmaster (born 2002)

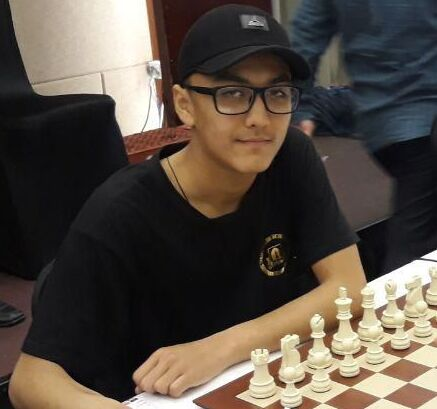
- Abdimalik in 2019

Personal information
- Born: March 3, 2002 (age 24) Yakkabogʻ District, Uzbekistan

Chess career
- Country: Uzbekistan
- Title: Grandmaster (2023)
- FIDE rating: 2548 (September 2026)
- Peak rating: 2569 (March 2026)

Abdimalik Abdisalimov (born 3 March 2002) is an Uzbekistani chess Grandmaster. He obtained the FIDE Grandmaster title on April 13, 2023.

== Chess career ==
Abdisalimov represented Uzbekistan in the World U16 Chess Olympiad in 2015. He played on Board four, going undefeated with four wins and three draws.

In 2017, he obtained six points out of possible nine in the 11th Tashkent Open, Agazamov Memorial (group A), finishing in 19th position.

In 2019, he finished 23rd in Bhopal International GM tournament with seven point after ten rounds.

In 2022, he won the 9th Familcao Open with 7.5 points out of nine, the 1st International Al-Beruniy Chess Tournament (Group A) with seven points out of nine. He obtained 6.5 points out of nine in International Istanbul Open (category A) finishing 4th. He finished 5th in the 3rd Gujarat International Open with eight points out of ten. He obtained 6.5 points out of nine in Leca Chess Open 2022, finishing 7th.

In 2023, he finished 7th in the Central Asian Chess Cup with six points out of nine. He finished 4th in the 3rd Sahibkiran Amir Temur Cup (Group A) with 6.5 points out of nine. He finished 4th in the 29th Abu Dhabi International Chess Festival, Masters category with 6.5 points out of nine. He obtained 6.5 points out of nine to finish 4th in the 8th Istanbul Open (Category A).
