= Nodirbek Yakubboev =

Uzbekistani chess grandmaster (born 2002)

- Yakubboev at the 2026 Chess Olympiad

Personal information
- Born: 23 January 2002 (age 24) Tashkent, Uzbekistan

Chess career
- Country: Uzbekistan
- Title: Grandmaster (2019)
- FIDE rating: 2685 (September 2026)
- Peak rating: 2712 (October 2026)
- Ranking: No. 39 (September 2026)
- Peak ranking: No. 26 (October 2026)

Nodirbek Yakubboev (Note: Uzbek: Нодирбек Ёқуббоев/Nodirbek Yoqubboyev.) (born 23 January 2002) is an Uzbek chess grandmaster.

== Career ==
Yakubboev was born in Tashkent on 23 January 2002. He has won the Uzbekistani Chess Championship three times; in 2016, 2018 and 2020. He came second in the Zone 3.4 Zonal Open Championship in 2021, qualifying for the Chess World Cup 2021.

In 2022, he won the gold medal at the 44th Chess Olympiad in Chennai with the Uzbekistan team, playing in 2nd board, where he won the individual bronze medal, scoring eight points out of eleven and having a performance rating of 2759.

In 2023, he won the Qatar Masters tournament in a tie-break playoff against fellow Uzbek Nodirbek Abdusattorov.

In June 2024, Yakubboev participated in the UzChess Cup Masters, finishing first ahead of Nodirbek Abdusattorov on tiebreaks. He scored 5.5/9 (+2−0=7), winning the tournament as the bottom-seeded player.

In August 2024, Yakubboev won the Masters tournament at the 30th Abu Dhabi International Chess Festival with a score of 7/9 (+5−0=4).

During the Tata Steel Chess Tournament 2025, Yakubboev refused to shake hands with four female opponents for "religious reasons". He later apologized to Vaishali Rameshbabu and explained how he respects her as a player, and both the players ended the controversy on respectable terms. Yakubboev lost his game against Vaishali.

Yakubboev finished fourth overall at the 2025 World Cup, after defeating players including Pranav V, Gabriel Sargissian, and Alexander Donchenko to advance to the semifinals, where he lost to fellow countryman Javokhir Sindarov. He narrowly missed out on candidates qualification after losing to Andrey Esipenko in the third place playoff.

== Family ==
He has an older sister, Nilufar Yakubbaeva, who has won the Women's section of the Uzbekistani Chess Championship multiple times.
