= FIDE Circuit =

Series of chess tournaments

The FIDE Circuit is a series of top individual chess tournaments managed and regulated by FIDE (the International Chess Federation).

== History ==
Introduced in 2023, the circuit awards points to players based on their performances in eligible tournaments, with the top player qualifying for the Candidates Tournament. The annual circuit was converted to last a biennium with FIDE Circuit 2026-2027. The system was designed to provide an additional qualification path to the Candidates Tournament, complementing other routes such as the Chess World Cup and Grand Swiss Tournament.

Since 2024, FIDE announced a similar path for qualification in Women's Candidates Tournament, starting FIDE Women's Events 2024-2025, though it only included 8 FIDE organized events. It was replaced by a separate circuit for major women only chess tournaments, namely FIDE Women's Circuit 2026-2027.

== Winners ==
Winners of FIDE Circuit
Year	Points	Winner	Ref
2023	130.42	(United States) Fabiano Caruana	
2024	118.61	(United States) Fabiano Caruana	
2025	115.17	(India) R Praggnanandhaa	
2026–2027	TBA		

Winners of FIDE Women's Circuit (or Events)
Year	Points	Winner	Ref
2024-2025 Events	280.00	(India) Koneru Humpy	
2026-2027	TBA		

== Detailed Results ==
The following results refer to the top 10 eligible point scorers in FIDE Circuits of the respective years

=== FIDE Circuits ===
==== 2023 ====
- : Winner (Qualifier to Candidates Tournament 2024)
- : Candidates Qualifier (qualified for Candidates Tournament 2024 via another path)

Rank	Player	Points	Events				
Rank	Player	Points	1	2	3	4	5
1	(United States) Fabiano Caruana (Note: Qualified for the Candidates Tournament by finishing third in the World Cup)	118.61	GCT Romania 1st – 26.84	(Norway) Stavanger (Main) 2nd – 21.75	(FIDE) World Cup 3rd – 21.41	(United States) US Championship 1st – 22.68	(United States) St Louis 1st – 25.93
2	(India) Gukesh Dommaraju	87.36	(Germany) Düsseldorf T 2nd-3rd – 19.26	(United Arab Emirates) Sharjah 3rd – 13.13	(Norway) Stavanger (Main) 3rd – 19.03	(FIDE) World Cup QF – 15.86	(India) Chennai 1st – 20.08
3	(Netherlands) Anish Giri	84.31	(Netherlands) Tata Steel (M) 1st – 27.00	GCT Romania T 2nd-5th – 17.44	(Norway) Stavanger (Main) 4th – 16.31	(Netherlands) Dutch Championship 1st – 13.09	(FIDE) Grand Swiss 7th – 10.47
4	(United States) Wesley So	83.40	(Netherlands) Tata Steel (M) 4th – 16.20	(Germany) Düsseldorf 4th – 14.60	GCT Romania T 2nd-5th – 17.44	(United States) US Championship 2nd – 17.01	(United States) St Louis 3rd – 18.15
5	(India) Arjun Erigaisi	81.24	(United Arab Emirates) Sharjah 1st – 21.89	(FIDE) World Cup QF – 15.86	(Qatar) Doha T 3rd-8th – 11.13	(FIDE) Grand Swiss 4th – 14.39	(India) Chennai 2nd – 17.97
6	(Iran) Amin Tabatabaei	56.14	(Netherlands) Tata Steel (Ch) 4th – 8.00	(Armenia) Jermuk 3rd – 10.55	(United Arab Emirates) Sharjah 7th – 8.76	(Hungary) Budapest 2nd – 14.86	(United Kingdom) London 2nd – 13.97
7	(India) R Praggnanandhaa	54.79	(Germany) Düsseldorf T 5th-10th – 2.03	(Hungary) Budapest 1st – 19.18	(FIDE) World Cup 2nd – 24.18	Tata Steel India (Rapid) 3rd – 8.96	(FIDE) Grand Swiss 13th – 0.44 (T 8th-13th)
8	(Uzbekistan) Nodirbek Abdusattorov	54.63	(Netherlands) Tata Steel (M) T 2nd-3rd – 20.25	(Germany) Düsseldorf T 5th-10th – 2.03	(Norway) Stavanger (Blitz) 1st – 10.88	(Qatar) Doha 2nd – 21.03	(FIDE) Grand Swiss 12th – 0.44 (T 8th-13th)
9	(United States) Hans Niemann	46.85	(Spain) Menorca 6th – 6.82	(United Arab Emirates) Sharjah 6th – 9.85	(Kazakhstan) Uralsk 1st – 9.66	(United States) US Championship 6th – 7.94	(Croatia) Zagreb 1st – 12.58
10	(Uzbekistan) Javokhir Sindarov	46.25	(Netherlands) Tata Steel (Ch) 3rd – 9.33	(United Arab Emirates) Dubai 2nd – 14.29	(China) Hangzhou 3rd – 8.45	(Qatar) Doha T 3rd-8th – 11.13	(FIDE) Grand Swiss 8th – 3.05

==== 2024 ====
Rank	Player	Points	Events						
Rank	Player	Points	1	2	3	4	5	6	7
1	(United States) Fabiano Caruana	130.42	(FIDE) Candidates 4th – 15.92	GCT Romania 1st – 21.23	GCT Croatia 1st – 13.92	(United States) Sinquefield Cup 2nd – 20.85	(United States) US Championship 1st – 25.00	(United States) US Masters 1st – 17.11	(United States) St. Louis Masters T 1st-2nd – 16.39
2	(India) Arjun Erigaisi	124.40	(China) Shenzhen 3rd – 15.18	(Spain) Menorca 1st – 16.19	(Sweden) Malmö 2nd – 14.00 (T 2nd-3rd)	(Armenia) Avagyan Memorial 1st – 19.79	(United Kingdom) WR Masters 1st – 25.40	(India) Chennai 3rd – 17.22	(Qatar) Doha 2nd – 16.62
3	(Uzbekistan) Nodirbek Abdusattorov	108.49	(Netherlands) Tata Steel (M) 3rd – 14.22 (T 2nd-4th)	(Czech Republic) Prague (M) 1st – 25.00	(Sweden) Malmö 1st – 16.21	(Uzbekistan) Tashkent (M) 2nd – 19.28	(United States) Sinquefield Cup T 3rd-4th – 9.12	(Uzbekistan) President Cup 5th – 9.11	(Qatar) Doha 3rd – 15.55
4	(France) Alireza Firouzja	89.07	(FIDE) Candidates 7th – 7.35	GCT Romania T 2nd-4th – 14.70	GCT Croatia T 2nd-4th – 6.33	(United States) GCT St. Louis 1st – 14.60	(United States) Sinquefield Cup 1st – 28.67	(United Kingdom) WR Masters T 3rd-4th – 16.51	(FIDE) World Rapid 7th – 7.24
5	(India) Gukesh Dommaraju	84.13	(Netherlands) Tata Steel (M) 2nd – 14.22 (T 2nd-4th)	(Czech Republic) Prague (M) 7th – 0.00	(FIDE) Candidates 1st – 26.94	GCT Romania T 2nd-4th – 14.70	GCT Croatia 7th – 0.00	(United States) Sinquefield Cup T 5th-7th – 0.00	(FIDE) World Champion 1st – 28.27
6	(India) R Praggnanandhaa	66.76	(Czech Republic) Prague (M) 4th – 11.36 (T 2nd-4th)	(FIDE) Candidates 5th – 12.24	GCT Poland 4th – 0.00	GCT Romania T 2nd-4th – 14.70	(United Kingdom) WR Masters T 3rd-4th – 16.51	(India) Kolkata Rapid 2nd – 11.95	(India) Kolkata Blitz 4th – 0.00
7	(FIDE) Volodar Murzin	63.50	(Spain) Menorca 17th – 0.13 (T 8th-21st)	(Italy) Sardinia 3rd – 11.69	(United Arab Emirates) Sharjah 2nd – 17.37	(United Arab Emirates) Abu Dhabi 7th – 3.15	Singapore 22nd – 0.00	(FIDE) World Rapid 1st – 25.16	(FIDE) World Blitz T 5th-8th – 6.00
8	(Uzbekistan) Nodirbek Yakubboev	57.40	(Russia) Moscow 3rd – 12.14	(United Arab Emirates) Dubai Police 51st – 0.00	(Kazakhstan) Aktobe 12th – 0.41 (T 7th-17th)	(Uzbekistan) Tashkent (M) 1st – 21.55	(United Arab Emirates) Abu Dhabi 1st – 14.77	(Uzbekistan) President Cup 6th – 8.15	(Qatar) Doha 18th – 0.38 (T 7th-20th)
9	(Iran) Amin Tabatabaei	56.39	(Russia) Moscow 1st – 19.79	(United Arab Emirates) Dubai Police 6th – 7.64	(United Arab Emirates) Sharjah 5th – 7.45	(Armenia) Avagyan Memorial 3rd – 10.79	(United Arab Emirates) Abu Dhabi 5th – 10.34	(Uzbekistan) President Cup 26th – 0.00	(Qatar) Doha 14th – 0.38 (T 7th-20th)
10	(Uzbekistan) Shamsiddin Vokhidov	53.56	(Russia) Moscow 34th – 0.00	(United Arab Emirates) Sharjah 4th – 15.17	(Uzbekistan) Tashkent (Ch) 1st – 13.82	(United Arab Emirates) Abu Dhabi 3rd – 12.11	(Uzbekistan) President Cup 4th – 12.46	(Qatar) Doha 23rd – 0.00	(FIDE) World Blitz 36th – 0.00

==== 2025 ====
- : Winner (Qualifier to Candidates Tournament 2026
- : Player qualified for Candidates Tournament 2026 via another path
- : Player ineligible for Candidates Tournament 2026 qualification

Rank	Player	Points	No. of Events	Events							
Rank	Player	Points	No. of Events	1	2	3	4	5	6	7	8
1	(India) R Praggnanandhaa	115.17	7	(Netherlands) Tata Steel (M) 1st – 25.00	GCT Romania Classic 1st – 23.90	(Armenia) Avagyan Memorial 2nd – 15.19	(Uzbekistan) UzChess (M) 1st – 22.19	(United States) Sinquefield Cup T 2nd-3rd – 20.72	(FIDE) World Cup R4 – 0.00	(United Kingdom) London (Open) T 1st-3rd – 8.17	Optional
2	(Uzbekistan) Nodirbek Abdusattorov	84.95	7	(Netherlands) Tata Steel (M) 3rd – 18.42	(United Arab Emirates) Sharjah 3rd – 13.80	(Uzbekistan) UzChess (M) 3rd – 18.56	(FIDE) Grand Swiss 10th – 1.21	(FIDE) World Cup R3 – 0.00	(United Kingdom) London 1st – 19.62	(FIDE) World Blitz 2nd – 13.34	Optional
3	(Netherlands) Anish Giri	82.43	6	(Netherlands) Tata Steel (M) T 5th-6th – 6.58	(Czech Republic) Prague (M) T 2nd-4th – 11.06	(United Arab Emirates) Sharjah 1st – 20.94	GCT Croatia R&B 7th – 0.00	(India) Chennai 2nd – 14.19	(FIDE) Grand Swiss 1st – 28.41	(FIDE) World Rapid T 9th-13th – 1.25	Optional
4	(United States) Fabiano Caruana	76.39	4	(Netherlands) Tata Steel (M) 9th – 0.00	GCT Romania Classic 4th – 0.00	(Norway) Stavanger 2nd – 20.93	GCT Croatia R&B 8th – 0.00	(United States) Sinquefield Cup T 2nd-3rd – 20.72	(United States) U.S. Champ 1st – 23.90	(FIDE) World Blitz T 3rd-4th – 10.84	Optional
5	(Uzbekistan) Javokhir Sindarov	68.40	5	(Sweden) Malmö 1st – 16.17	(Uzbekistan) UzChess (M) 2nd – 19.77	(FIDE) Grand Swiss 24th – 0.00	(FIDE) World Cup 1st – 27.88	(FIDE) World Rapid 7th – 4.58	(FIDE) World Blitz 14th – 0.00	Optional	
6	(Germany) Matthias Bluebaum	63.94	6	(FIDE) European Champ 1st – 15.73	(Germany) German Champ 2nd – 10.93	(Germany) Dortmund 1st – 6.89	(Poland) Rubinstein Memorial 3rd – 11.02	(FIDE) Grand Swiss 2nd – 19.37	(FIDE) World Cup R4 – 0.00	Optional	
7	(India) Arjun Erigaisi	60.26	5	(Netherlands) Tata Steel (M) 10th – 0.00	(Norway) Stavanger 5th – 0.00	(India) Chennai 3rd – 13.10	(FIDE) Grand Swiss 6th – 6.37	(FIDE) World Cup QF – 14.94	(FIDE) World Rapid 3rd – 15.01	(FIDE) World Blitz T 3rd-4th – 10.84	Optional
8	(India) Nihal Sarin	56.50	8	(Uzbekistan) Tashkent Open 1st – 15.80	(Spain) Menorca 8th – 1.23	(FIDE) Asian Champ 2nd – 12.96	(United Arab Emirates) Dubai Open 6th – 3.49	(United Arab Emirates) Fujairah T 9th-12th – 1.40	(FIDE) Grand Swiss 9th – 1.21	(Uzbekistan) President Cup 1st – 15.57	Optional
9	(Germany) Vincent Keymer	55.83	4	(Netherlands) Tata Steel (M) 8th – 0.00	(Czech Republic) Prague (M) 5th – 0.00	(Germany) German Champ 1st – 15.03	(India) Chennai 1st – 24.01	(FIDE) Grand Swiss 4th – 16.79	(FIDE) World Cup R4 – 0.00	(FIDE) World Rapid 50th – 0.00	Required
10	(Norway) Magnus Carlsen	53.23	2	(Norway) Stavanger 1st – 28.78	GCT Croatia R&B 1st – 15.18	(FIDE) World Rapid 1st – 24.45	(FIDE) World Blitz 1st – 18.34	Required	Required	Required	Optional
