= 2024 FIDE Circuit =

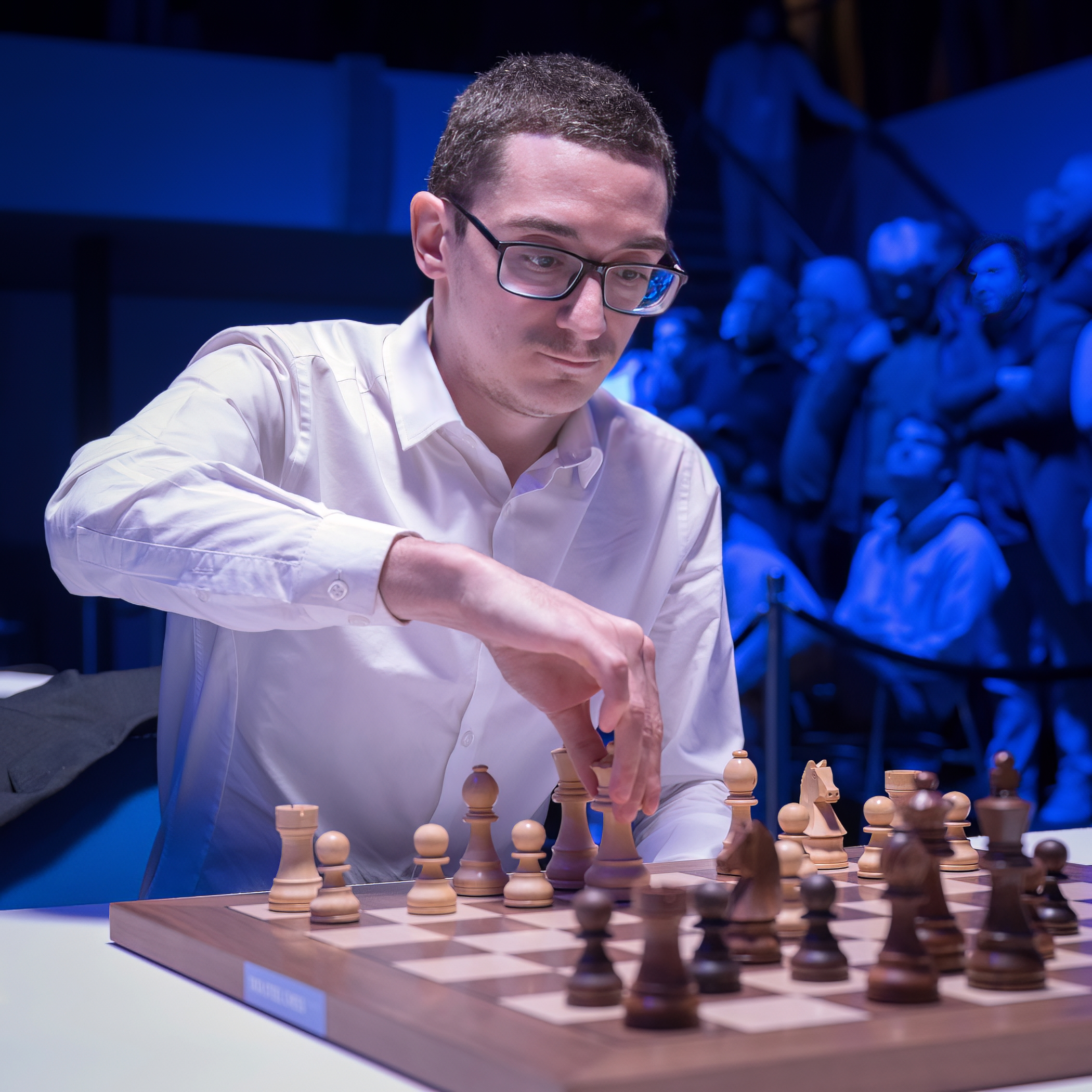
- 2024 FIDE Circuit winner Fabiano Caruana
- Duration: 28 December 2023 – 31 December 2024
- Winner: (United States) Fabiano Caruana

Seasons
- ← 2023 2025 →

The 2024 FIDE Circuit was a system comprising the top chess tournaments in 2024, which served as a qualification path for the Candidates Tournament 2026. Players received points based on their performance and the strength of the tournament. A player's final Circuit score was the sum of their seven best results of the year. Fabiano Caruana scored the most points, and as winner of the 2024 Circuit qualified for the Candidates Tournament 2026.

== Tournament eligibility ==
A FIDE-rated individual standard tournament was eligible for the Circuit if it met the following criteria:

1. Finished between 1 January 2024 and 15 December 2024.
2. Had at least 8 players.
3. Had at least 7 rounds (4 rounds for knockout events).
4. The 8 highest-rated players had an average standard rating of at least 2550 at the start of the tournament. This average is referred to as TAR (tournament average rating).
5. Players represented at least 3 national federations.
6. Not more than 50% of the 20 highest-rated players (or all players if fewer than 20) represented one federation.

The Circuit also included the following tournaments:

- The World Chess Championship 2024.
- National Championships that met points 1 to 4 in the above criteria.
- World Rapid Championship.
- World Blitz Championship.
- Continental Rapid Championships.
- Continental Blitz Championships.
- Other Rapid and Blitz tournaments that met the above criteria, except that the TAR had to be at least 2700.

== Points system ==
=== Event points ===
Circuit points obtained by a player from a tournament were calculated as follows:

$$P = B \times k \times w$$

where:

- $P$ - Points obtained by player from the tournament
- $B$ - Basic points
- $k$ - Tournament strength factor, calculated as $k = (TAR-2500) / 100$
- $w$ - Tournament weighting
  - 1.0 - Standard classical tournaments
  - 0.8 - World Rapid Championships
  - 0.6 - World Blitz Championships and other Rapid tournaments
  - 0.5 - Mixed Rapid & Blitz tournaments
  - 0.4 - Blitz tournaments

=== Basic points ===
Basic points for a tournament were awarded depending on the tournament format:

- Swiss-system: Top 8 (within top half of ranking), ties included.
- Round-robin: Top 3 with ties (with the exception of the Candidates Tournament 2024 where points were awarded to all players).
- Knockout: Third round or later, up to 8 players.

Points were awarded as follows:

1st	2nd	3rd	4th	5th	6th	7th	8th
11/10	8	7	6	5	4	3	2

- If the tournament was won outright, basic points for 1st place would be 11 points. Otherwise, 10 basic points would be used for calculation.
- For tied positions, basic points were calculated as 50% of points for final ranking as determined by tournament's tie-break rules, plus 50% of the sum of basic points assigned for the tied places divided by the number of tied players. If no tie-break rule was applied, basic points were shared equally among all tied players.
- For round-robin tournaments (other than the Candidates), 4th and below were worth zero points for tied players calculation.

=== FIDE World Championship points ===
For the World Chess Championship 2024, the winner had points calculated as 1st place basic points multiplied by the strength factor, but with its TAR value using the winner's performance rating instead.

=== Player's total and ranking ===
A player's point total for the ranking was the sum of their best 7 tournaments with the following criteria:

Tournaments	Standard events with under 50 players allowed	Rapid/Blitz allowed
1–5	4	1
6	4	2
7	5	2

- If a player had 6 or 7 tournaments to count:
  - No more than 4 or 5 respectively standard tournaments with the participation of less than 50 players could be counted.
  - No more than 2 rapid/blitz tournaments could be counted.
- If a player had 5 tournaments or less:
  - No more than 4 standard tournaments with participation of less than 50 players could be counted.
  - No more than 1 rapid/blitz tournament could be counted.

Tournaments that could be included in a player's results were as follows:

- Official FIDE tournaments.
- National Championships.
- Other eligible tournaments, counting all tournaments with minimum TAR of 2650 and up to two lower tournaments per host country.

== Tournaments ==
Eligible tournaments as of 31 December 2024.

2024 FIDE Circuit – Eligible Tournaments
Tournament	Location	Date	Type	P#	TAR	Winner
Hastings	(United Kingdom) Hastings	28 December, 2023 – 5 January, 2024		105	2552	(India) Abhijeet Gupta
Tata Steel Masters	(Netherlands) Wijk aan Zee	12–28 January		14	2752 3/4	(China) Wei Yi
Tata Steel Challengers	(Netherlands) Wijk aan Zee	12–28 January		14	2637 3/4	(India) Leon Luke Mendonca
Djerba Masters	(Tunisia) Djerba	18–25 February		8	2590 1/2	(Belgium) Daniel Dardha
Prague Masters	(Czech Republic) Prague	27 February – 7 March		10	2727 1/4	(Uzbekistan) Nodirbek Abdusattorov
Prague Challengers	(Czech Republic) Prague	27 February – 7 March		10	2575 3/4	(Turkey) Ediz Gürel
Prague Open	(Czech Republic) Prague	27 February – 7 Mar		267	2567 3/4	(Greece) Stamatis Kourkoulos-Arditis
Shenzhen Masters	(China) Shenzhen	29 February – 7 March		8	2698	(China) Bu Xiangzhi
Cappelle-la-Grande Open	(France) Cappelle-la-Grande	2–8 March		382	2562 5/8	(India) Abhimanyu Puranik
Aeroflot Open	(Russia) Moscow	3–7 March		142	2679 7/8	(Iran) Amin Tabatabaei
Reykjavik Open	(Iceland) Reykjavík	15–21 March		363	2602 3/4	(Romania) Bogdan-Daniel Deac
Fagernes Chess International	(Norway) Fagernes	24–31 March		100	2568	(Kazakhstan) Rinat Jumabayev
Torneo International de Ajedrez de Roda	(Spain) La Roda	27–31 March		210	2603 7/8	(India) Aravindh Chithambaram
Grenke Open	(Germany) Karlsruhe	26 March – 1 April		935	2689 1/4	(United States) Hans Niemann
Open Internacional de Ajedrez Semana Santa	(Spain) Alicante	27 March – 1 April		417	2574 1/2	(Austria) Kirill Alekseenko
Menorca Open	(Spain) Menorca	2–7 April		284	2676 5/8	(India) Arjun Erigaisi
Candidates	(Canada) Toronto	3–22 April	FIDE	8	2744 7/8	(India) Gukesh Dommaraju
Sunway Formentera	(Spain) Formentera	9–19 April		51	2581 3/4	(Germany) Alexander Donchenko
Spring Chess Classic	(United States) St. Louis	11–20 April		10	2624 7/8	(India) Leon Luke Mendonca
TePe Sigeman	(Sweden) Malmö	27 April – 3 May		8	2676 7/8	(Uzbekistan) Nodirbek Abdusattorov
Sardinia World Chess Festival	(Italy) Orosei	27 April – 4 May		168	2658 1/2	(Belgium) Daniel Dardha
Dubai Police Global Chess Challenge	(United Arab Emirates) Dubai	3–13 May		135	2694 3/8	(India) Pranav V
GCT Superbet Poland Rapid & Blitz	(Poland) Warsaw	6–13 May	Rapid & Blitz	10	2762 3/8	(Norway) Magnus Carlsen
Chinese Chess Championship	(China) Xinghua	6–16 May	National	12	2570 1/4	(China) Wang Yue
Sharjah Masters	(United Arab Emirates) Sharjah	13–23 May		88	2720 5/8	(Iran) Bardiya Daneshvar
Polish Chess Championship	(Poland) Rzeszów	21–31 May	National	10	2586 1/2	(Poland) Radosław Wojtaszek
Budapesti Tavaszi Fesztivál	(Hungary) Budapest	23–31 May		210	2597 5/8	(Israel) Yahli Sokolovsky
Americas Continental Championship	(Colombia) Medellín	24 May – 2 June	Continental; FIDE	387	2582 1/8	(Colombia) Roberto García Pantoja
Dubai Open	(United Arab Emirates) Dubai	25 May – 2 June		71	2608 1/2	(Azerbaijan) Mahammad Muradli
Vladimir Dvorkovich Memorial	(Kazakhstan) Aktobe	25 May – 2 June		90	2682 3/8	(Iran) Parham Maghsoodloo
National Open	(United States) Las Vegas	5–9 June		136	2583 1/2	(Azerbaijan) Vasif Durarbayli
UzChess Cup Masters	(Uzbekistan) Tashkent	6–14 June		10	2726 7/8	(Uzbekistan) Nodirbek Yakubboev
UzChess Cup Challengers	(Uzbekistan) Tashkent	6–14 June		10	2625 5/8	(Uzbekistan) Shamsiddin Vokhidov
Stepan Avagyan Memorial	(Armenia) Jermuk	9–18 June		10	2679 7/8	(India) Arjun Erigaisi
Teplice Open	(Czech Republic) Teplice	15–23 June		240	2629	(Netherlands) Max Warmerdam
Serbian Chess Championship	(Serbia) Senta	17–25 June	National	10	2556 1/8	(Serbia) Aleksandar Inđić
Arona International Chess Festival	(Spain) Arona, Tenerife	22–30 June		161	2584 7/8	(China) Xue Haowen
GCT Romania	(Romania) Bucharest	24 June – 6 July		10	2761 1/4	(United States) Fabiano Caruana
Baku Open	(Azerbaijan) Baku	29 June – 7 July		126	2625	(Iran) Sina Movahed
Dutch Chess Championship	(Netherlands) Utrecht	6–13 July	National	16	2586 3/8	(Netherlands) Max Warmerdam
GCT Croatia Rapid & Blitz	(Croatia) Zagreb	8–15 July	Rapid & Blitz	10	2753	(United States) Fabiano Caruana
Biel Chess Festival	(Switzerland) Biel/Bienne	13–26 July		128	2593 3/4	(Kazakhstan) Rinat Jumabayev
DOLE Open/NEXTLANE Grand Prix	(France) Aix-en-Provence	20–28 July		177	2627 7/8	(India) Pranesh M
GCT St. Louis Rapid & Blitz	(United States) St. Louis	10–17 August	Rapid & Blitz	10	2765 3/8	(France) Alireza Firouzja
Internationale Dortmunder Schachtage	(Germany) Dortmund	10–18 August		193	2582 7/8	(Netherlands) Nico Zwirs
Abu Dhabi Masters	(United Arab Emirates) Abu Dhabi	15–24 August		217	2677 1/4	(Uzbekistan) Nodirbek Yakubboev
Akiba Rubinstein Chess Festival	(Poland) Polanica-Zdrój	17–25 August		10	2696 3/8	(Germany) Vincent Keymer
French Championship	(France) Alpe d'Huez	17–25 August	National	16	2577 1/4	(France) Jules Moussard
Indian Chess Championship	(India) Gurgaon	17–27 August	National	341	2562 7/8	(India) Karthik Venkataraman
Russian Championship	(Russia) Barnaul	17–28 August	National	12	2668 3/4	(FIDE) Vladislav Artemiev (Note: Russian players' flags are displayed as the FIDE flag, as Russian and Belarusian flags have been banned from FIDE-rated events in response to the Russian invasion of Ukraine.)
Sinquefield Cup	(United States) St. Louis	19–29 August		10	2760 5/8	(France) Alireza Firouzja
Iberoamerican Championship	(Spain) Linares	24 September – 2 October		118	2569 7/8	(Spain) Alan Pichot
Gashimov Memorial	(Azerbaijan) Shusha	25–30 September	Rapid & Blitz	8	2704 5/8	(FIDE) Ian Nepomniachtchi
US Championship	(United States) St. Louis	11–23 October	National	12	2727 1/4	(United States) Fabiano Caruana
Pavlodar Open Masters	(Kazakhstan) Pavlodar	12–22 October		96	2585 7/8	(Armenia) Aram Hakobyan
WR Chess Masters Cup	(United Kingdom) London	14–17 October		16	2754	(India) Arjun Erigaisi
Chennai Grand Masters	(India) Chennai	5–11 November		8	2724 5/8	(India) Aravindh Chithambaram
European Chess Championship	(Montenegro) Petrovac	7–20 November	Continental; FIDE	388	2675 5/8	(Serbia) Aleksandar Inđić
Tata Steel Chess India Rapid	(India) Kolkata	13–15 November	Rapid	10	2757	(Norway) Magnus Carlsen
Tata Steel Chess India Blitz	(India) Kolkata	16–17 November	Blitz	10	2757	(Norway) Magnus Carlsen
International President Cup	(Uzbekistan) Tashkent	21–29 November		120	2691 3/4	(India) Nihal Sarin
World Chess Championship	Singapore	25 November – 13 December	FIDE	2	2757	(India) Gukesh Dommaraju
U.S. Masters	(United States) Charlotte	27 November – 1 December		264	2655 1/2	(United States) Fabiano Caruana
Singapore International Open	Singapore	29 November – 5 December		285	2626 1/8	(China) Lu Shanglei
London Chess Classic	(United Kingdom) London	29 November – 6 December		8	2637 5/8	(England) Gawain Jones
London Chess Classic – Open	(United Kingdom) London	29 November – 7 December		87	2560	(India) Raunak Sadhwani (Israel) Ilya Smirin
Saint Louis Masters	(United States) St. Louis	3–7 December		59	2682 1/8	(United States) Fabiano Caruana (Germany) Alexander Donchenko
Qatar Masters	(Qatar) Doha	3–12 December		138	2714 1/2	(FIDE) Andrey Esipenko
European Rapid Championship	(North Macedonia) Skopje	7–8 December	Rapid; Continental; FIDE	398	2669 1/8	(Slovenia) Vladimir Fedoseev
European Blitz Championship	(North Macedonia) Skopje	9 December	Blitz; Continental; FIDE	368	2669 1/8	(Netherlands) Jorden van Foreest
World Rapid Championship	(United States) New York	26–28 December	Rapid; FIDE	180	2785 7/8	(FIDE) Volodar Murzin
World Blitz Championship	(United States) New York	30–31 December	Blitz; FIDE	188	2785 7/8	(Norway) Magnus Carlsen (FIDE) Ian Nepomniachtchi

== Ranking ==
At the end of 2024, the best player in the Circuit qualified for the Candidates Tournament 2026, provided that his final score consisted of at least 5 tournaments (including at least 4 in standard time controls) and he played in at least 2 standard tournaments with over 50 participating players (if his final score consisted of 6 or 7 tournaments) or at least 1 standard tournament with over 50 participating players (if his final score consisted of 5 tournaments). Tournament results which could not be counted for qualification to the Candidates Tournament 2026 are marked in pink. "(M)" denotes the Masters section of tournaments while "(Ch)" – Challenger section.

- : Player qualified for Candidates Tournament 2026 via this path.
- : Current World Champion – ineligible for Candidates Tournament 2026 qualification
- : Player ineligible for Candidates Tournament 2026 qualification

Final 2024 rankings
No.	Player	Points	1	2	3	4	5	6	7
1	(United States) Fabiano Caruana	130.42	(FIDE) Candidates; 4th – 15.92	(Romania) GCT Romania; 1st – 21.23	(Croatia) GCT Croatia; 1st – 13.92	(United States) Sinquefield Cup; 2nd – 20.85	(United States) US Championship; 1st – 25.00	(United States) US Masters; 1st – 17.11	(United States) St. Louis Masters; T 1st-2nd – 16.39
2	(India) Arjun Erigaisi	124.40	(China) Shenzhen; 3rd – 15.18	(Spain) Menorca; 1st – 16.19	(Sweden) Malmö; 2nd – 14.00 (T 2nd-3rd)	(Armenia) Avagyan Memorial; 1st – 19.79	(United Kingdom) WR Masters; 1st – 25.40	(India) Chennai; 3rd – 17.22	(Qatar) Doha; 2nd – 16.62
3	(Uzbekistan) Nodirbek; Abdusattorov	108.49	(Netherlands) Tata Steel (M); 3rd – 14.22 (T 2nd-4th)	(Czech Republic) Prague (M); 1st – 25.00	(Sweden) Malmö; 1st – 16.21	(Uzbekistan) Tashkent (M); 2nd – 19.28	(United States) Sinquefield Cup; T 3rd-4th – 9.12	(Uzbekistan) President Cup; 5th – 9.11	(Qatar) Doha; 3rd – 15.55
4	(France) Alireza Firouzja	89.07	(FIDE) Candidates; 7th – 7.35	(Romania) GCT Romania; T 2nd-4th – 14.70	(Croatia) GCT Croatia; T 2nd-4th – 6.33	(United States) GCT St. Louis; 1st – 14.60	(United States) Sinquefield Cup; 1st – 28.67	(United Kingdom) WR Masters; T 3rd-4th – 16.51	(FIDE) World Rapid; 7th – 7.24
5	(India) Gukesh Dommaraju	84.13	(Netherlands) Tata Steel (M); 2nd – 14.22 (T 2nd-4th)	(Czech Republic) Prague (M); 7th – 0.00	(FIDE) Candidates; 1st – 26.94	(Romania) GCT Romania; T 2nd-4th – 14.70	(Croatia) GCT Croatia; 7th – 0.00	(United States) Sinquefield Cup; T 5th-7th – 0.00	(FIDE) World Champion; 1st – 28.27
6	(India) R Praggnanandhaa	66.76	(Czech Republic) Prague (M); 4th – 11.36 (T 2nd-4th)	(FIDE) Candidates; 5th – 12.24	(Poland) GCT Poland; 4th – 0.00	(Romania) GCT Romania; T 2nd-4th – 14.70	(United Kingdom) WR Masters; T 3rd-4th – 16.51	(India) Kolkata Rapid; 2nd – 11.95	(India) Kolkata Blitz; 4th – 0.00
7	(FIDE) Volodar Murzin	63.50	(Spain) Menorca; 17th – 0.13 (T 8th-21st)	(Italy) Sardinia; 3rd – 11.69	(United Arab Emirates) Sharjah; 2nd – 17.37	(United Arab Emirates) Abu Dhabi; 7th – 3.15	(Singapore) Singapore; 22nd – 0.00	(FIDE) World Rapid; 1st – 25.16	(FIDE) World Blitz; T 5th-8th – 6.00
8	(Uzbekistan) Nodirbek Yakubboev	57.40	(Russia) Moscow; 3rd – 12.14	(United Arab Emirates) Dubai Police; 51st – 0.00	(Kazakhstan) Aktobe; 12th – 0.41 (T 7th-17th)	(Uzbekistan) Tashkent (M); 1st – 21.55	(United Arab Emirates) Abu Dhabi; 1st – 14.77	(Uzbekistan) President Cup; 6th – 8.15	(Qatar) Doha; 18th – 0.38 (T 7th-20th)
9	(Iran) Amin Tabatabaei	56.39	(Russia) Moscow; 1st – 19.79	(United Arab Emirates) Dubai Police; 6th – 7.64	(United Arab Emirates) Sharjah; 5th – 7.45	(Armenia) Avagyan Memorial; 3rd – 10.79	(United Arab Emirates) Abu Dhabi; 5th – 10.34	(Uzbekistan) President Cup; 26th – 0.00	(Qatar) Doha; 14th – 0.38 (T 7th-20th)
10	(Uzbekistan) Shamsiddin Vokhidov	53.56	(Russia) Moscow; 34th – 0.00	(United Arab Emirates) Sharjah; 4th – 15.17	(Uzbekistan) Tashkent (Ch); 1st – 13.82	(United Arab Emirates) Abu Dhabi; 3rd – 12.11	(Uzbekistan) President Cup; 4th – 12.46	(Qatar) Doha; 23rd – 0.00	(FIDE) World Blitz; 36th – 0.00
11	(Belgium) Daniel Dardha	51.73	(Netherlands) Tata Steel (Ch); 2nd – 10.33 (T 2nd-3rd)	(Tunisia) Djerba; 1st – 8.60	(Spain) Menorca; 8th – 1.89	(Italy) Sardinia; 1st – 14.07	(FIDE) European Champ. 2nd – 14.05	(FIDE) European Rapid; 7th – 2.79	(FIDE) European Blitz; 16th – 0.00
12	(FIDE) Andrey Esipenko	50.98	(Russia) Moscow; 2nd – 13.04	(United Arab Emirates) Sharjah; 55th – 0.00	(Russia) Russian Champ. 2nd – 14.34	(Qatar) Doha; 1st – 23.60	(FIDE) World Rapid; 29th – 0.00	(FIDE) World Blitz; 75th – 0.00	
13	(FIDE) Ian Nepomniachtchi	49.16	(FIDE) Candidates; 3rd – 17.14	(Romania) GCT Romania; T 5th-7th – 0.00	(Croatia) GCT Croatia; 5th – 0.00	(United States) GCT St. Louis; T 6th-7th – 0.00	(Azerbaijan) Shusha; 1st – 11.25	(FIDE) World Rapid; 3rd – 16.58	(FIDE) World Blitz; T 1st-2nd – 15.44
14	(India) Leon Luke Mendonca	47.88	(Netherlands) Tata Steel (Ch); 1st – 15.15	(United States) St. Louis (Spring); 1st – 13.74	(United Arab Emirates) Sharjah; 28th – 0.00	(United Arab Emirates) Dubai Open; 23rd – 0.00	(Switzerland) Biel/Bienne; 2nd – 7.38	(United Arab Emirates) Abu Dhabi; 4th – 11.23	(Qatar) Doha; 16th – 0.38 (T 7th-20th)
15	(India) Aravindh; Chithambaram	47.25	(Spain) La Roda; 1st – 9.52	(Spain) Menorca; 16th – 0.13 (T 8th-21st)	(United Arab Emirates) Dubai Police; 2nd – 16.52	(United Arab Emirates) Sharjah; 13th – 0.00	(United Arab Emirates) Abu Dhabi; 12th – 0.49 (T 7th-15th)	(Azerbaijan) Shusha; 6th – 0.00	(India) Chennai; 1st – 20.59
16	(Iran) Parham Maghsoodloo	46.77	(Czech Republic) Prague (M); 3rd – 11.36 (T 2nd-4th)	(United Arab Emirates) Sharjah; 9th – 1.93 (T 5th-12th)	(Kazakhstan) Aktobe; 1st – 20.06	(Uzbekistan) Tashkent (M); 10th – 0.00	(India) Chennai; 6th – 0.00	(Uzbekistan) President Cup; 3rd – 13.42	(Qatar) Doha; 64th – 0.00
17	(United States) Hans Niemann	44.01	(Netherlands) Tata Steel (Ch); 7th – 0.00	(Tunisia) Djerba; 2nd – 7.69	(Germany) Grenke Open; 1st – 20.82	(United Arab Emirates) Dubai Police; 7th – 6.66	(United Arab Emirates) Sharjah; 15th – 0.00	(United States) US Championship; 4th – 2.84 (T 2nd-7th)	(FIDE) World Blitz; T 5th-8th – 6.00
18	(Slovenia) Vladimir Fedoseev	38.59	(Germany) Grenke Open; 3rd – 10.30	(Spain) Menorca; 4th – 9.27	(Italy) Sardinia; 6th – 4.18	(United Arab Emirates) Sharjah; 41st – 0.00	(Poland) Polanica-Zdrój; 4th – 3.68 (T 2nd-5th)	(FIDE) European Champ. 15th – 0.00	(FIDE) European Rapid; 1st – 11.16
19	(Germany) Alexander Donchenko	36.20	(Spain) Formentera; 1st – 8.99	(United Arab Emirates) Dubai Police; 12th – 0.00	(Uzbekistan) Tashkent (Ch); 7th – 0.00	(Czech Republic) Teplice; 3rd – 9.89	(FIDE) European Champ. 16th – 0.00	(United States) US Masters; 7th – 0.93 (T 6th-20th)	(United States) St. Louis Masters; T 1st-2nd – 16.39
20	(France) Maxime; Vachier-Lagrave	35.77	(Romania) GCT Romania; T 5th-7th – 0.00	(Croatia) GCT Croatia; T 2nd-4th – 6.33	(United States) GCT St. Louis; T 4th-5th – 0.00	(United States) Sinquefield Cup; T 3rd-4th – 9.12	(United Kingdom) WR Masters; 2nd – 20.32	(India) Chennai; 5th – 0.00	(FIDE) World Rapid; 34th – 0.00

== Criticism ==
The FIDE Circuit system has drawn criticism from top players, including Levon Aronian, Anish Giri, and Fabiano Caruana, for various reasons. Critics have highlighted issues such as flawed scoring and financial burdens, raising questions about the system's fairness and practicality.

=== Flawed point allocations ===
Critics argue the points system is poorly designed, rewarding players inconsistently and only awarding the first three players in closed tournaments. For example, Gukesh, Abdusattorov, and Giri tied for first in the Tata Steel Masters (with a +4 score), but earned only 14.22 points each, while Leon Luke Mendonca gained 15.15 points for winning the significantly weaker Challengers section. Firouzja, Vidit and Praggnanandhaa didn't win any points for tying for fifth among the fourteen players, despite scoring +2.

Caruana expressed frustration that third place at the relatively weaker Menorca Open, with a TAR of 2676 5/8, earned more points than he did for fourth place at the Candidates Tournament, which had a TAR of 2744 7/8. The Candidates was an exception to the top three rule, as Circuit points were awarded to all eight participants. For the 2025 Circuit, the rules were amended to reward points to the top four finishers in closed events with 11–13 participants, and the top five finishers in events with more than 13 participants.

==== Exclusion of certain events ====
The Circuit excludes tournaments where over 50% of participants are from the same federation unless it is a national championship. For instance, the American Cup, a high-stakes tournament featuring strong players, did not count because all participants were from the United States. FIDE CEO Emil Sutovsky justified this rule as a response to perceived exploitation in prior years, citing protests by American players against Ding Liren’s qualification to the 2022 Candidates via Chinese-organized events played a role. Aronian suggested only allowing tournaments with pre-announced participants.

Norway Chess, another strong tournament that featured world number one Magnus Carlsen as well as World Champion Ding, also didn't qualify for the Circuit due to having only six participants, as only tournaments with eight or more players were eligible. The rules for the 2025 Circuit were amended to allow double round-robin tournaments with at least 6 participants and an average rating of 2700 to be eligible.

=== Financial burden on players ===
The shift from the FIDE Grand Prix (with significant prize funds) to the Circuit system forces players to compete in numerous open tournaments, which often have lower prize money and higher financial risks. Giri noted the economic strain, pointing out that players must accept these risks to stay competitive in the Circuit standings.

=== Inclusion of open tournaments ===
FIDE defends the Circuit as a way to give more players access to the Candidates by prioritizing open tournaments over exclusive invitations. Sutovsky, who was previously president of the Association of Chess Professionals which organized the ACP Tour, a precursor to the Circuit, argued that the system levels the playing field for those without consistent access to elite events. Caruana countered that FIDE ratings already provide a democratic system, and emphasized that rating gains in open tournaments are achievable through consistent good performance, making the Circuit system redundant and unnecessarily complicated.

== See also ==
- 2023 FIDE Circuit
