= Qatar Chess Association =

Qatari governing body for chess

The Qatar Chess Association, also known as the Qatar Chess Federation, is the governing body for chess in Qatar. It is a national member of FIDE and the Asian Chess Federation.

== History ==
The Qatar Chess Association was created in 1985. Khalifa Mohammed Al-Hitmi became its general secretary and president in 1989. In 2006, the Qatar Chess Association was represented for the first time at the Asian Games. It was then led by Mohammed Al-Modiahki who organized the Qatar Masters Open in December 2015.
