= Anna Burtasova =

Russian-Canadian chess player (born 1987)

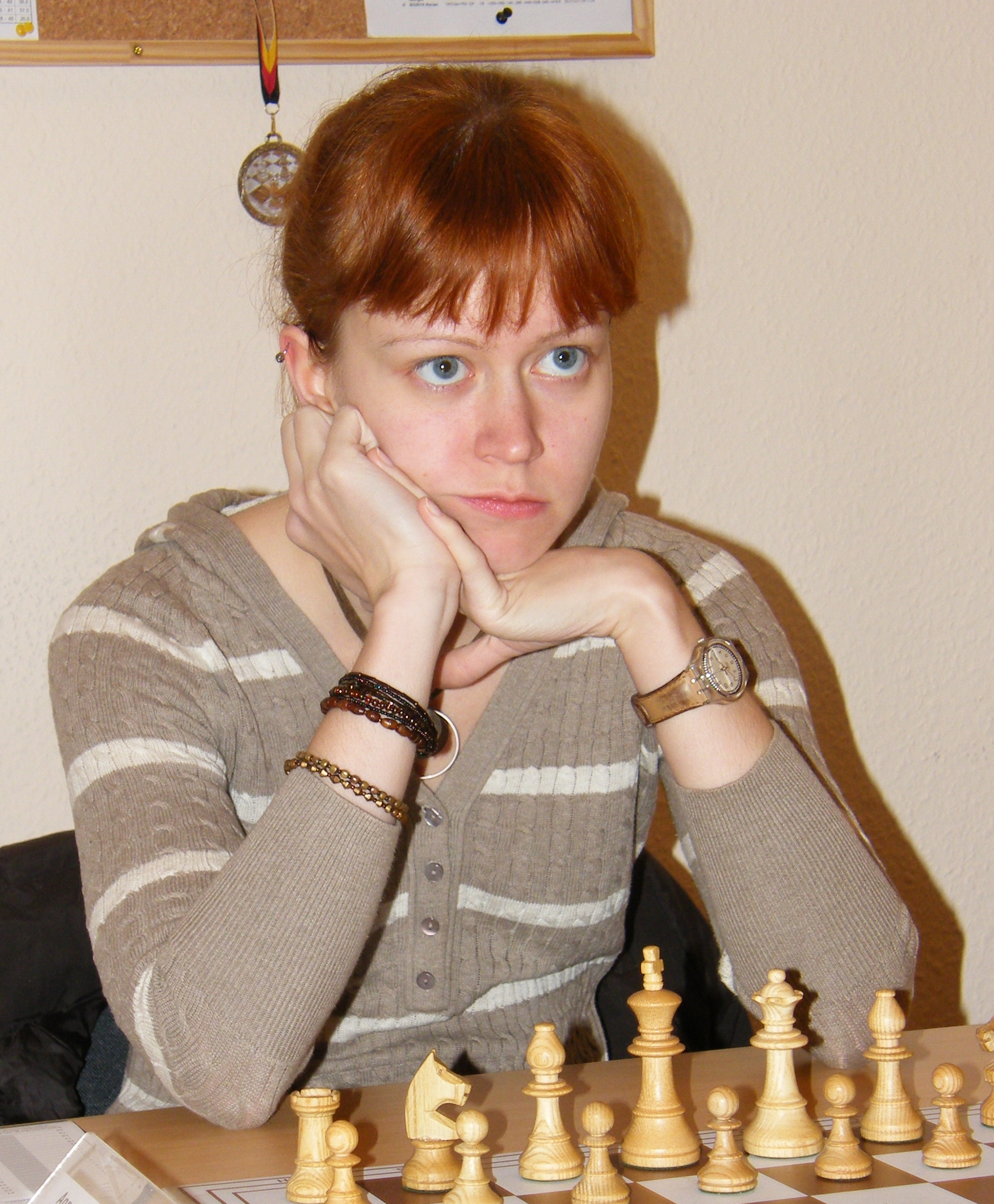
- Burtasova in 2008

Personal information
- Born: Anna Denisovna Burtasova; 19 February 1987 (age 39) Vladimir, Russia

Chess career
- Country: Russia (until 2019); Canada (since 2019)
- Title: Woman Grandmaster (2009)
- FIDE rating: 2241 (June 2022)
- Peak rating: 2345 (January 2008)

Anna Denisovna Burtasova (Russian: Анна Денисовна Буртасова; born 19 February 1987) is a Russian-born Canadian chess player. She was awarded the title of Woman Grandmaster by FIDE in 2009, gaining all three of her norms in Kharkiv, Ukraine. In 2010 she was listed as the chief strategy office for the Chess Network Company. She switched federations from Russia to Canada in 2019. In 2022 Burtasova was among several Russian chess players who signed a letter denouncing the Russian Invasion of Ukraine and calling for an immediate ceasefire.

As of 2022, Burtasova managed the online presence of FIDE.

During the 2024 Candidates Tournament and Women's Candidates Tournament, Burtasova served as the FIDE Press Officer. In this role, she moderated tournament press conferences, including post-game analyses with the players, and published a recap of each round's games.
