= Grand Chess Tour 2024 =

Series of chess tournaments

Grand Chess Tour
- 2024
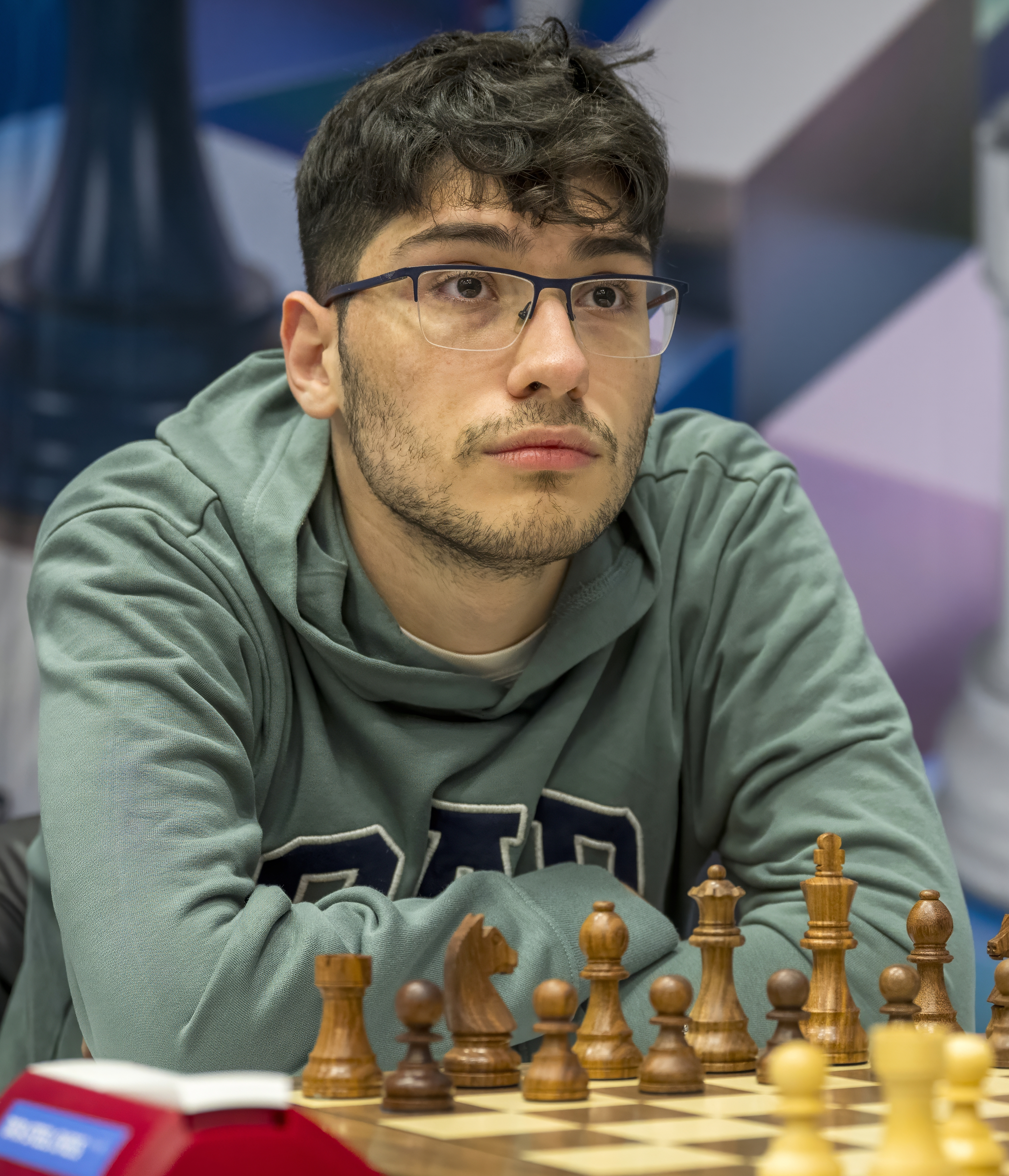
- 2024 Grand Chess Tour winner Alireza Firouzja

Tournament information
- Dates: May 6–August 31, 2024
- Host(s): Warsaw; Bucharest; Zagreb; St. Louis

Final positions
- Champion: (France) Alireza Firouzja
- Runner-up: (United States) Fabiano Caruana
- 3rd place: (France) Maxime Vachier-Lagrave

Tournament statistics
- Most tournament titles: (France) Alireza Firouzja (United States) Fabiano Caruana (2)
- Prize money leader: (France) Alireza Firouzja ($323,750)
- Points leader: (France) Alireza Firouzja (43.58)

The Grand Chess Tour 2024 was a series of chess tournaments, which was the ninth edition of the Grand Chess Tour. It consisted of five tournaments with a total prize pool of US$1.4 million, including two tournaments with classical time control and three tournaments with faster time controls.

== Format ==
The tour featured five tournaments, two classicals and three rapid & blitz, respectively. Rapid & Blitz tournaments consisted of two parts – rapid (2 points for win, 1 for draw) and blitz (1 point for win, 0.5 for draw). Combined result for both portions will count in overall standings.

The tour points are to be awarded as follows:

Place	Tour Points	Classical prize money	Rapid & Blitz prize money	GCT Tour bonuses
1st	12/13*	$100,000	$40,000	$100,000
2nd	10	$65,000	$30,000	$50,000
3rd	8	$48,000	$25,000	$25,000
4th	7	$32,000	$20,000	
5th	6	$26,000	$15,000	
6th	5	$21,000	$11,000	
7th	4	$18,500	$10,000	
8th	3	$16,000	$9,000	
9th	2	$13,000	$8,000	
10th	1	$10,500	$7,000	

- If a player wins 1st place outright (without the need for a playoff), they are awarded 13 points instead of 12.
- Tour points and prize money are shared equally between tied players.

== Lineup ==
The lineup for the tour consisted of nine players, including the defending GCT champion Fabiano Caruana. The 2024 edition is marked by participation of several teenage grandmasters – World Chess Championship 2024 challenger Gukesh D, Candidates Tournament 2024 participant R Praggnanandhaa and World Rapid Chess Championship 2021 winner Nodirbek Abdusattorov. Among notable absentees are reigning World Chess Champion Ding Liren, highest rated player in the world Magnus Carlsen and Hikaru Nakamura. However, they are announced as wildcards for certain events.

Player	Country	FIDE Rating (February 2024)
Fabiano Caruana	United States	2804
Alireza Firouzja	France	2760
Wesley So	United States	2757
Gukesh Dommaraju	India	2743
Nodirbek Abdusattorov	Uzbekistan	2744
Ian Nepomniachtchi	FIDE (Note: Nepomniachtchi is Russian, but plays under the FIDE flag due to FIDE banning Russian and Belarusian flags from FIDE-rated events in response to the Russian invasion of Ukraine.)	2758
Maxime Vachier-Lagrave	France	2732
Anish Giri	Netherlands	2762
R Praggnanandhaa	India	2747

== Results ==
=== Tournament results ===
Dates	Tournament Name	Format	Host city	Winner	Runner-up	Third place
May 6–13, 2024	Superbet Rapid & Blitz Poland	Rapid & blitz	Warsaw	Magnus Carlsen (WC)	Wei Yi (WC)	Jan-Krzysztof Duda (WC)
June 24–July 6, 2024	Superbet Chess Classic Romania	Classical	Bucharest	Fabiano Caruana	Alireza Firouzja; Gukesh Dommaraju; R Praggnanandhaa	–
July 8–15, 2024	SuperUnited Rapid & Blitz Croatia	Rapid & blitz	Zagreb	Fabiano Caruana	Wesley So; Alireza Firouzja; Maxime Vachier-Lagrave	–
August 10–17, 2024	Saint Louis Rapid & Blitz	Rapid & blitz	St. Louis	Alireza Firouzja	Wesley So	Hikaru Nakamura (WC)
August 19–29, 2024	Sinquefield Cup	Classical	St. Louis	Alireza Firouzja	Fabiano Caruana	Maxime Vachier-Lagrave; Nodirbek Abdusattorov

=== Tour rankings ===
The wildcards (in italics) are not counted in overall standings.

	Player	POL	ROU	CRO	STL	SIN	Total points	Prize money
1	Alireza Firouzja (France)	—N/a	9.25	8.33	13	13	43.58	$323,750
2	Fabiano Caruana (United States)	—N/a	9.25	13	4.5	10	36.75	$234,250
3	Maxime Vachier-Lagrave (France)	—N/a	5	8.33	6.5	7.5	27.33	$129,333
4	Wesley So (United States)	—N/a	2.5	8.33	10	5	25.83	$91,333
5	R Praggnanandhaa (India)	7	9.25	—N/a	1	5	22.25	$107,583
6	Gukesh Dommaraju (India)	1	9.25	4	—N/a	5	19.25	$97,583
T-7	Ian Nepomniachtchi (FIDE)	—N/a	5	6	4.5	2.5	18	$61,833
T-7	Nodirbek Abdusattorov (Uzbekistan)	5	2.5	—N/a	3	7.5	18	$74,500
9	Anish Giri (Netherlands)	3	5	3	—N/a	1	12	$50,333
	Magnus Carlsen (Norway)	13	—N/a	—N/a	—N/a	—N/a	13	$40,000
	Levon Aronian (United States)	—N/a	—N/a	5	6.5	—N/a	11.5	$28,500
	Wei Yi (China)	10	—N/a	—N/a	—N/a	—N/a	10	$30,000
	Jan-Krzysztof Duda (Poland)	8	—N/a	—N/a	—N/a	—N/a	8	$25,000
	Hikaru Nakamura (United States)	—N/a	—N/a	—N/a	8	—N/a	8	$25,000
	Arjun Erigaisi (India)	6	—N/a	—N/a	—N/a	—N/a	6	$15,000
	Kirill Shevchenko (Romania)	4	—N/a	—N/a	—N/a	—N/a	4	$10,000
	Ding Liren (China)	—N/a	—N/a	—N/a	—N/a	2.5	2.5	$14,500
	Vincent Keymer (Germany)	2	—N/a	—N/a	—N/a	—N/a	2	$8,000
	Vidit Gujrathi (India)	—N/a	—N/a	2	—N/a	—N/a	2	$8,000
	Leinier Domínguez (United States)	—N/a	—N/a	—N/a	2	—N/a	2	$8,000
	Bogdan-Daniel Deac (Romania)	—N/a	1	—N/a	—N/a	—N/a	1	$10,500
	Ivan Šarić (Croatia)	—N/a	—N/a	1	—N/a	—N/a	1	$7,000

== Tournaments ==
=== Superbet Rapid and Blitz Poland ===
The first leg of the Grand Chess Tour was held in Warsaw, Poland from May 8 to 13, 2024. Wei Yi was the winner of the rapid portion. For the second year in a row, Magnus Carlsen won the blitz portion and was the overall winner of the tournament.

2024 GCT Superbet Rapid & Blitz Poland, May 8–13 Warsaw, Poland
	Player	Rapid	Blitz	Total	TB	Tour Points	Prize money	Circuit
1	Magnus Carlsen (NOR)	12	14	26		WC (13)	$40,000	14.43
2	Wei Yi (CHN)	13	12½	25½		WC (10)	$30,000	10.50
3	Jan-Krzysztof Duda (POL)	9	10½	19½		WC (8)	$25,000	9.18
4	R Praggnanandhaa (IND)	10	9	19		7	$20,000	
5	Arjun Erigaisi (IND)	8	10	18		WC (6)	$15,000	
6	Nodirbek Abdusattorov (UZB)	8	9½	17½		5	$11,000	
7	Kirill Shevchenko (ROU)	9	6	15		WC (4)	$10,000	
8	Anish Giri (NED)	7	7	14		3	$9,000	
9	Vincent Keymer (GER)	7	6	13		WC (2)	$8,000	
10	Gukesh Dommaraju (IND)	7	5½	12½		1	$7,000	

2024 GCT Superbet Rapid & Blitz Poland – Rapid, May 8–10 Warsaw, Poland
	Player	Rating	1	2	3	4	5	6	7	8	9	10	Points
1	Wei Yi (CHN)	2758		0	1	2	2	1	2	1	2	2	13
2	Magnus Carlsen (NOR)	2828	2		1	1	1	1	2	2	1	1	12
3	R Praggnanandhaa (IND)	2704	1	1		0	1	1	2	2	2	0	10
4	Kirill Shevchenko (ROU)	2622	0	1	2		1	0	1	2	0	2	9
5	Jan-Krzysztof Duda (POL)	2748	0	1	1	1		2	1	0	1	2	9
6	Arjun Erigaisi (IND)	2671	1	1	1	2	0		1	0	1	1	8
7	Nodirbek Abdusattorov (UZB)	2733	0	0	0	1	1	1		1	2	2	8
8	Vincent Keymer (GER)	2647	1	0	0	0	2	2	1		1	0	7
9	Anish Giri (NED)	2687	0	1	0	2	1	1	0	1		1	7
10	Gukesh Dommaraju (IND)	2649	0	1	2	0	0	1	0	2	1		7

2024 GCT Superbet Rapid & Blitz Poland – Blitz, May 11–12 Warsaw, Poland
	Player	Rating	1	2	3	4	5	6	7	8	9	10	Points
1	Magnus Carlsen (NOR)	2886		½ 1	½ 1	1 ½	0 1	0 1	1 ½	1 1	1 1	1 1	14
2	Wei Yi (CHN)	2684	½ 0		1 0	1 1	1 1	1 0	1 1	1 ½	1 ½	0 1	12½
3	Jan-Krzysztof Duda (POL)	2766	½ 0	0 1		0 1	1 0	0 ½	½ 1	1 1	1 1	0 1	10½
4	Arjun Erigaisi (IND)	2744	0 ½	0 0	1 0		1 ½	1 1	½ 1	1 0	½ 1	1 0	10
5	Nodirbek Abdusattorov (UZB)	2661	1 0	0 0	0 1	0 ½		½ 1	½ 0	1 1	½ 1	1 ½	9½
6	R Praggnanandhaa (IND)	2675	1 0	0 1	1 ½	0 0	½ 0		0 1	1 0	0 1	1 1	9
7	Anish Giri (NED)	2715	0 ½	0 0	½ 0	½ 0	½ 1	1 0		0 ½	½ 1	½ ½	7
8	Kirill Shevchenko (ROU)	2546	0 0	0 ½	0 0	0 1	0 0	0 1	1 ½		0 1	1 0	6
9	Vincent Keymer (GER)	2610	0 0	0 ½	0 0	½ 0	½ 0	1 0	½ 0	1 0		1 1	6
10	Gukesh Dommaraju (IND)	2651	0 0	1 0	1 0	0 1	0 ½	0 0	½ ½	0 1	0 0		5½

=== Superbet Romania Chess Classic ===
The second leg of the Grand Chess Tour was held in Bucharest, Romania from June 25–5 July, 2024.

2024 GCT Superbet Chess Classic, June 25–5 July Bucharest, Romania, Category XX (2750)
	Player	Rating	1	2	3	4	5	6	7	8	9	10	Points	TB	Tour Points	Prize money	Circuit
1	Fabiano Caruana (USA)	2805		1	½	½	0	½	½	½	½	1	5	3	9.25	$68,750	21.23
2	Alireza Firouzja (FRA)	2737	0		½	½	½	½	½	1	1	½	5	2	9.25	$58,750	14.70
3	Gukesh Dommaraju (IND)	2763	½	½		½	½	½	½	½	½	1	5	1	9.25	$58,750	14.70
4	R Praggnanandhaa (IND)	2747	½	½	½		1	½	½	½	½	½	5	0	9.25	$58,750	14.70
5	Anish Giri (NED)	2745	1	½	½	0		½	½	½	½	½	4½		5	$21,833	
6	Maxime Vachier-Lagrave (FRA)	2732	½	½	½	½	½		½	½	½	½	4½		5	$21,833	
7	Ian Nepomniachtchi (FIDE)	2770	½	½	½	½	½	½		½	½	½	4½		5	$21,833	
8	Wesley So (USA)	2757	½	0	½	½	½	½	½		½	½	4		2.5	$14,500	
9	Nodirbek Abdusattorov (UZB)	2766	½	0	½	½	½	½	½	½		½	4		2.5	$14,500	
10	Bogdan-Daniel Deac (ROU)	2680	0	½	0	½	½	½	½	½	½		3½		WC (1)	$10,500	

First place playoff
Place	Player	Rapid rating	1	2	3	4	Score
1	Fabiano Caruana (USA)	2738		1	1	1	3
2	Alireza Firouzja (FRA)	2724	0		1	1	2
3	Gukesh Dommaraju (IND)	2647	0	0		1	1
4	R Praggnanandhaa (IND)	2709	0	0	0		0

=== Zagreb Rapid & Blitz ===
2024 GCT Rapid & Blitz Croatia, July 9–14 Zagreb, Croatia
	Player	Rapid	Blitz	Total	TB	Tour Points	Prize money	Circuit
1	Fabiano Caruana (USA)	15	12	27		13	$40,000	13.92
T–2	Wesley So (USA)	12	11	23		8.33	$25,000	6.33
T–2	Maxime Vachier-Lagrave (FRA)	10	13	23		8.33	$25,000	6.33
T–2	Alireza Firouzja (FRA)	10	13	23		8.33	$25,000	6.33
5	Ian Nepomniachtchi (FIDE)	10	8½	18½		6	$15,000	
6	Levon Aronian (USA)	11	6	17		WC (5)	$11,000	
7	Gukesh Dommaraju (IND)	9	5	14		4	$10,000	
8	Anish Giri (NED)	6	7½	13½		3	$9,000	
9	Vidit Gujrathi (IND)	4	7	11		WC (2)	$8,000	
10	Ivan Šarić (CRO)	3	7	10		WC (1)	$7,000	

2024 GCT Rapid & Blitz Croatia – Rapid, July 10–12 Zagreb, Croatia
	Player	Rating	1	2	3	4	5	6	7	8	9	10	Points
1	Fabiano Caruana (USA)	2738		1	2	1	1	2	2	2	2	2	15
2	Wesley So (USA)	2722	1		1	1	1	1	2	1	2	2	12
3	Levon Aronian (USA)	2750	0	1		1	1	0	2	2	2	2	11
4	Ian Nepomniachtchi (FIDE)	2754	1	1	1		1	1	0	1	2	2	10
5	Alireza Firouzja (FRA)	2724	1	1	1	1		1	1	2	0	2	10
6	Maxime Vachier-Lagrave (FRA)	2747	0	1	2	1	1		0	1	2	2	10
7	Gukesh Dommaraju (IND)	2647	0	0	0	2	1	2		1	1	2	9
8	Anish Giri (NED)	2679	0	1	0	1	0	1	1		1	1	6
9	Vidit Gujrathi (IND)	2701	0	0	0	0	2	0	1	1		0	4
10	Ivan Šarić (CRO)	2614	0	0	0	0	0	0	0	1	2		3

2024 GCT Rapid & Blitz Croatia – Blitz, July 13–14 Zagreb, Croatia
	Player	Rating	1	2	3	4	5	6	7	8	9	10	Points
1	Alireza Firouzja (FRA)	2863		½ 0	1 1	0 1	1 1	1 1	1 1	0 1	1 1	½ 0	13
2	Maxime Vachier-Lagrave (FRA)	2764	½ 1		½ ½	½ ½	0 0	1 1	1 1	1 ½	1 1	1 1	13
3	Fabiano Caruana (USA)	2777	0 0	½ ½		1 0	0 1	½ 1	1 ½	1 1	1 1	1 1	12
4	Wesley So (USA)	2773	1 0	½ ½	0 1		1 ½	0 1	½ 1	1 1	½ ½	0 1	11
5	Ian Nepomniachtchi (FIDE)	2800	0 0	1 1	1 0	0 ½		½ ½	0 1	1 0	0 ½	1 ½	8½
6	Anish Giri (NED)	2689	0 0	0 0	½ 0	1 0	½ ½		½ ½	½ ½	½ 1	1 ½	7½
7	Ivan Šarić (CRO)	2601	0 0	0 0	0 ½	½ 0	1 0	½ ½		½ 1	1 1	0 ½	7
8	Vidit Gujrathi (IND)	2657	1 0	0 ½	0 0	0 0	0 1	½ ½	½ 0		½ ½	1 1	7
9	Levon Aronian (USA)	2766	0 0	0 0	0 0	½ ½	1 ½	½ 0	0 0	½ ½		1 1	6
10	Gukesh Dommaraju (IND)	2627	½ 1	0 0	0 0	1 0	0 ½	0 ½	1 ½	0 0	0 0		5

=== Saint Louis Rapid & Blitz ===
2024 Saint Louis Rapid & Blitz, August 10–17 St. Louis, Missouri, United States
	Player	Rapid	Blitz	Total	TB	Tour Points	Prize money	Circuit
1	Alireza Firouzja (FRA)	11	12	23		13	$40,000	14.60
2	Wesley So (USA)	9	11	20		10	$30,000	10.62
3	Hikaru Nakamura (USA)	9	10½	19½		WC (8)	$25,000	9.29
T–4	Levon Aronian (USA)	10	9	19		WC (6.5)	$17,500	
T–4	Maxime Vachier-Lagrave (FRA)	11	8	19		6.5	$17,500	
T–6	Fabiano Caruana (USA)	8	10	18		4.5	$10,500	
T–6	Ian Nepomniachtchi (FIDE)	11	7	18		4.5	$10,500	
8	Nodirbek Abdusattorov (UZB)	8	8	16		3	$9,000	
9	Leinier Domínguez (USA)	9	6½	15½		WC (2)	$8,000	
10	R Praggnanandhaa (IND)	4	8	12		1	$7,500	

2024 GCT Saint Louis Rapid & Blitz – Rapid
	Player	Rating	1	2	3	4	5	6	7	8	9	10	Points
1	Ian Nepomniachtchi (FIDE)	2753		2	2	0	1	1	2	1	0	2	11
2	Alireza Firouzja (FRA)	2731	0		1	1	2	2	1	2	1	1	11
3	Maxime Vachier-Lagrave (FRA)	2747	0	1		1	1	1	2	2	1	2	11
4	Levon Aronian (USA)	2754	2	1	1		1	1	1	0	2	1	10
5	Wesley So (USA)	2735	1	0	1	1		1	1	2	1	1	9
6	Hikaru Nakamura (USA)	2746	1	0	1	1	1		1	0	2	2	9
7	Leinier Domínguez (USA)	2693	0	1	0	1	1	1		1	2	2	9
8	Nodirbek Abdusattorov (UZB)	2732	1	0	0	2	0	2	1		1	1	8
9	Fabiano Caruana (USA)	2777	2	1	1	0	1	0	0	1		2	8
10	R Praggnanandhaa (IND)	2688	0	1	0	1	1	0	0	1	0		4

2024 GCT Saint Louis Rapid & Blitz – Blitz
	Player	Rating	1	2	3	4	5	6	7	8	9	10	Points
1	Alireza Firouzja (FRA)	2869		1 ½	1 ½	½ 0	0 ½	½ 1	½ 1	1 0	1 1	1 1	12
2	Wesley So (USA)	2782	0 ½		1 0	1 ½	1 1	½ ½	1 0	1 ½	½ ½	1 ½	11
3	Hikaru Nakamura (USA)	2874	0 ½	0 1		0 ½	1 0	½ 1	0 1	1 1	1 1	1 0	10½
4	Fabiano Caruana (USA)	2795	½ 1	0 ½	1 ½		1 1	½ ½	1 0	1 0	0 1	0 ½	10
5	Levon Aronian (USA)	2727	1 ½	0 0	0 1	0 0		1 ½	1 ½	1 0	0 ½	1 1	9
6	Maxime Vachier-Lagrave (FRA)	2795	½ 0	½ ½	½ 0	½ ½	0 ½		1 1	1 0	0 1	½ 0	8
7	R Praggnanandhaa (IND)	2693	½ 0	0 1	1 0	0 1	0 ½	0 0		0 1	1 1	0 1	8
8	Nodirbek Abdusattorov (UZB)	2669	0 1	0 ½	0 0	0 1	0 1	0 1	1 0		0 1	1 ½	8
9	Ian Nepomniachtchi (FIDE)	2777	0 0	½ ½	0 0	1 0	1 ½	1 0	0 0	1 0		½ 1	7
10	Leinier Domínguez (USA)	2651	0 0	0 ½	0 1	1 ½	0 0	½ 1	1 0	0 ½	½ 0		6½

=== Sinquefield Cup ===
2024 GCT Sinquefield Cup, August 19–29 St. Louis, Missouri, United States, Category XXI (2755)
	Player	Rating	1	2	3	4	5	6	7	8	9	10	Points	TB	Tour Points	Prize money	Circuit
1	Alireza Firouzja (FRA)	2751		1	½	½	½	½	½	1	½	1	6		13	$100,000	28.67
2	Fabiano Caruana (USA)	2793	0		½	1	½	½	½	½	1	1	5½		10	$65,000	20.85
3	Maxime Vachier-Lagrave (FRA)	2721	½	½		½	½	½	½	1	½	½	5		7.5	$40,000	9.12
4	Nodirbek Abdusattorov (UZB)	2762	½	0	½		½	½	1	½	1	½	5		7.5	$40,000	9.12
5	Gukesh Dommaraju (IND)	2766	½	½	½	½		½	½	½	½	½	4½		5	$21,833	
6	R Praggnanandhaa (IND)	2749	½	½	½	½	½		½	½	½	½	4½		5	$21,833	
7	Wesley So (USA)	2751	½	½	½	0	½	½		½	1	½	4½		5	$21,833	
8	Ding Liren (CHN)	2745	0	½	0	½	½	½	½		½	½	3½		WC (2.5)	$14,500	
9	Ian Nepomniachtchi (FIDE)	2767	½	0	½	0	½	½	0	½		1	3½		2.5	$14,500	
10	Anish Giri (NED)	2746	0	0	½	½	½	½	½	½	0		3		1	$10,500	
