= 2024 United States Chess Championship =

2024 Chess tournament

US Chess Championships 2024
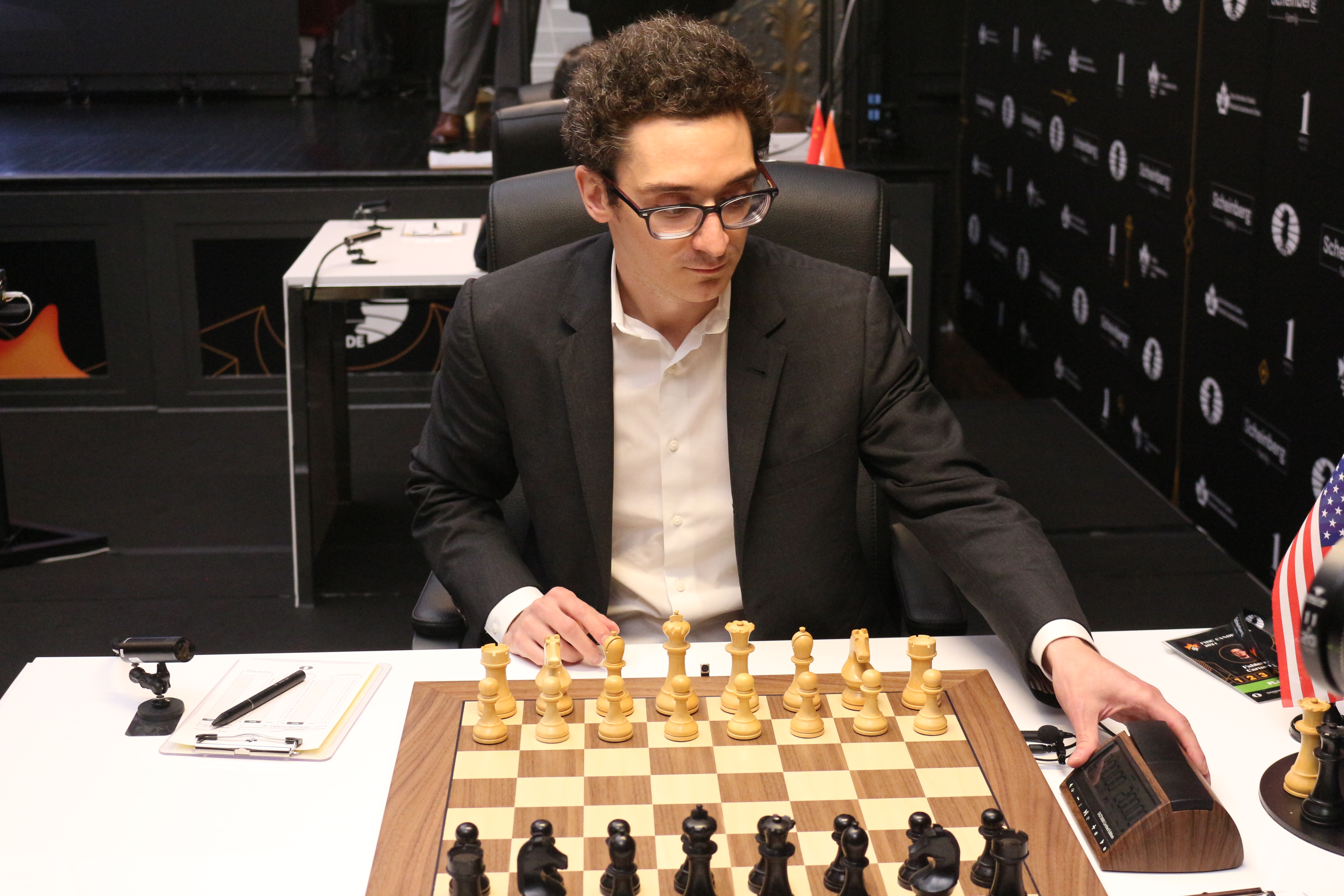
- Fabiano Caruana, the defending champion, secured his third consecutive title at the 2024 Championships
- Venue: Saint Louis Chess Club
- Location: St. Louis, Missouri
- Dates: October 10–24, 2024
- Competitors: 12
- Winning score: 7 points of 10
- Total prize money: $250,000

Champion
- (United States) Fabiano Caruana

The 2024 edition of the United States Chess Championship took place at the Saint Louis Chess Club in St. Louis, Missouri from October 10 to October 24, 2024. As with every United States Chess Championship tournament since 2014, it was a round-robin tournament. Twelve players were invited to compete. Besides the reigning US champion, these included the winners of the US Open Chess Championship, the US Junior Championship, and the US Senior Open Championship. The remaining players were chosen by highest invitational rating, or were selected by the United States Chess Federation (USCF) as wildcards.

The twelve qualifiers were Fabiano Caruana, Wesley So, Leinier Domínguez, Levon Aronian, Sam Shankland, Ray Robson, Samuel Sevian, Hans Niemann, Christopher Yoo, Abhimanyu Mishra, Grigoriy Oparin and Awonder Liang, all of whom are grandmasters.

Fabiano Caruana won the tournament by 1.5 points from six players who tied for second.

== Participants ==
All statistics are as of October 2024 in FIDE ratings.

Participants
| Player | Age | Rating | World ranking | Qualification method |
|---|---|---|---|---|
| (United States) Fabiano Caruana (defending champion) | 32 | 2796 | 4 | 2023 Champion |
| (United States) Wesley So | 30 | 2751 | 10 | Rating |
| (United States) Leinier Domínguez | 41 | 2741 | 13 | Rating |
| (United States) Levon Aronian | 41 | 2737 | 16 | Rating |
| (United States) Sam Shankland | 33 | 2667 | 50 | Rating |
| (United States) Ray Robson | 29 | 2692 | 37 | Rating |
| (United States) Samuel Sevian | 22 | 2689 | 42 | Rating |
| (United States) Hans Niemann | 21 | 2733 | 19 | Rating |
| (United States) Christopher Yoo | 17 | 2590 | 197 | Rating |
| (United States) Abhimanyu Mishra | 15 | 2630 | 112 | Wildcard |
| (United States) Grigoriy Oparin | 27 | 2662 | 64 | Rating |
| (United States) Awonder Liang | 21 | 2677 | 48 | 2024 US Open Champion |

== Participation of Hans Niemann ==
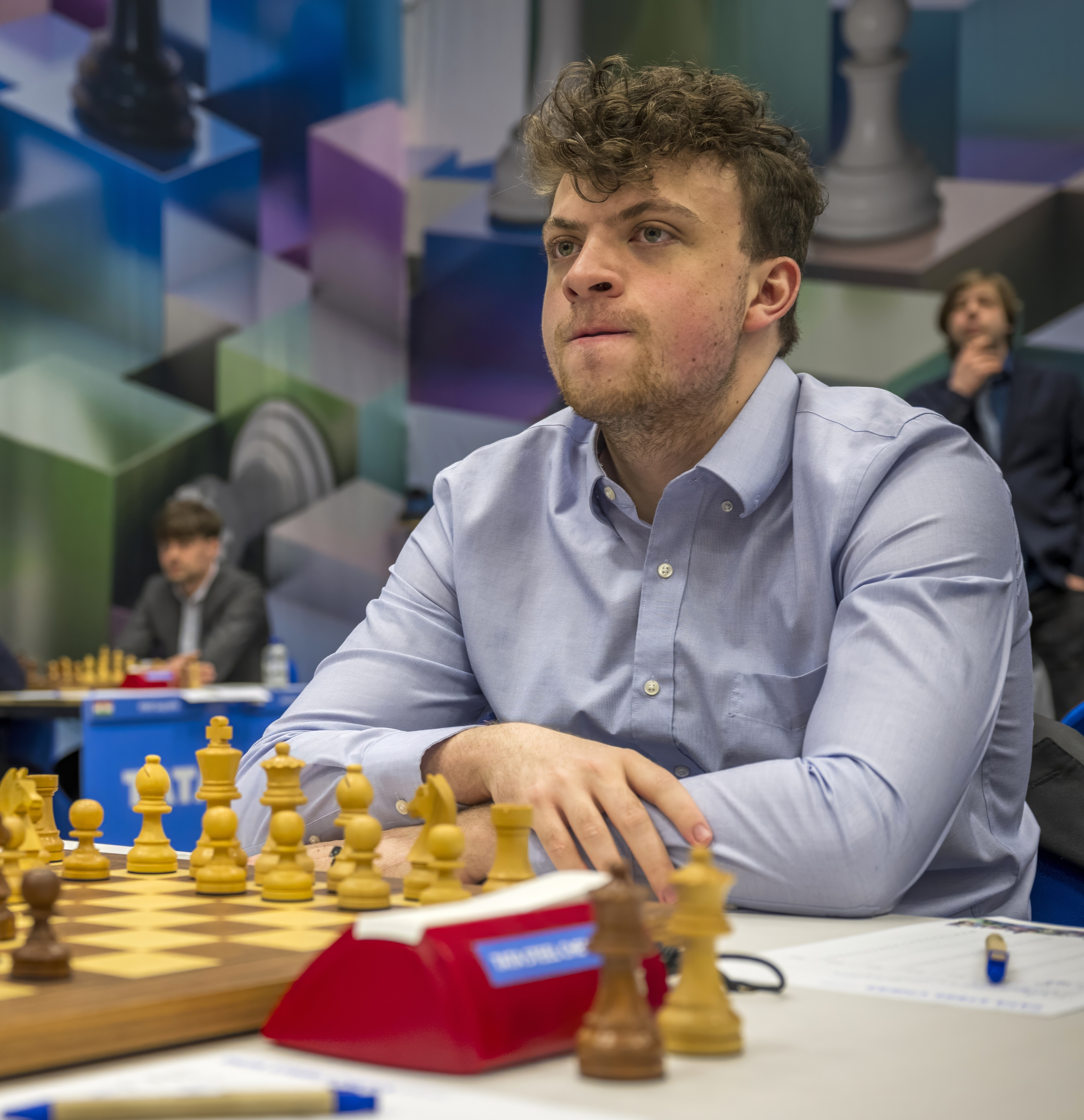
Niemann during the 2024 Tata Steel Chess Tournament

The Saint Louis Chess Club banned GM Hans Niemann for the remainder of 2024 on February 2, citing alleged inappropriate behavior and damage to private property. The grandmaster dismissed the accusations as "blatant disinformation."

While the club did not provide specific details about the alleged incidents leading to the ban, it emphasized that the decision was not taken lightly. The club cites Niemann’s inappropriate behaviour — including damaging private property and rude comments — as justification for their decision. Niemann has posted a number of posts on X denying the accusations.

As a result Niemann was refused participation from multiple elite chess tournaments in 2024 such as the Sinquefield Cup and Saint Louis Rapid & Blitz.

Despite his 'ban' still being in effect it was announced in late September that he would be participating in the 2024 United States Chess Championship.

== Expulsion of Christopher Yoo ==
GM Christopher Yoo has been "temporarily suspended, pending a full investigation" by the US Chess Federation, and charged by the St. Louis Metropolitan Police Department with assault.

Arbiter Chris Bird clarified that further to his Safe Play complaint, the USCF had temporarily suspended Yoo's membership pending a full investigation.

Bird also provided more information on the incident involving Yoo and a female videographer, explaining "the videographer was not at fault, nobody approached Yoo as he left the playing room, the punch was completely unprovoked, from behind and in no way accidental."

It further transpired that the St. Louis Metropolitan Police Department had charged 17-year-old Yoo with fourth-degree assault as he had "struck a 24-year-old woman in the back with his fist. He was released to a parent, and the matter would be handled in juvenile courts", reported KSDK, a St. Louis television station.

The tournament continued, with one player slated to get a bye in each round. However, such round-robin tournaments with an odd number of participants have an inherent weakness: till the completion of the final round, the number of games played by each participant is bound to be uneven. This might allow a competitive advantage to those who get their bye early in the tournament rather than those who get them towards the end.

== Organization ==
The tournament was a twelve-player, round-robin tournament, meaning there were 12 rounds with each player facing the others once. The tournament winner will become the United States Chess Champion.

=== Regulations ===
- The time control is 90 minutes for the first 40 moves, followed by 30 minutes for the rest of the game. There is a 30-second increment starting on move one.
- Players are not allowed to draw by agreement.
- The event is a 12-player round-robin, where every player plays once against every other player on the field.
- Players get 1 point for a win, 0.5 points for a draw, and 0 points for a loss.
- The player with the most points at the end of the last round wins the event.

=== Tie breaks ===
While there was no tie for first place, such a situation would have been addressed as follows:

If two players tie for first a two-game 10+2 rapid match will take place. If there remains a tie, a single armageddon game will occur.

If three or four players tie for first a single round-robin in the 10+2 rapid time control will take place

If two players remain tied, they contest a two-game 3+2 blitz match. If the tie persists, an armageddon game decides the winner.

If three or more players remain tied, they contest a 3+2 round-robin.

If more than four players tie for first players will contest a 3+2 round-robin. If the round-robin ends in a tie, a series of armageddon games decide the winner.

=== Prize money ===
The event features a $250,000 prize fund, distributed as follows:

| Place | Cash prize (USD) |
|---|---|
| 1st | $55,000 (+$7,000 winner bonus) |
| 2nd | $43,000 |
| 3rd | $35,000 |
| 4th | $25,000 |
| 5th | $20,000 |
| 6th | $14,000 |
| 7th | $11,000 |
| 8th | $10,000 |
| 9th | $9,000 |
| 10th | $8,000 |
| 11th | $7,000 |
| 12th | $6,000 |

== Results ==
=== Standings ===
Fabiano Caruana won the tournament with a score of 7/10.

| # | Player | Rating | 1 | 2 | 3 | 4 | 5 | 6 | 7 | 8 | 9 | 10 | 11 | Points |
|---|---|---|---|---|---|---|---|---|---|---|---|---|---|---|
| 1 | (United States) Fabiano Caruana (defending champion) | 2796 | — | 1 | ½ | ½ | ½ | ½ | ½ | ½ | 1 | 1 | 1 | 7 |
| 2 | (United States) Ray Robson | 2693 | 0 | — | 1 | 1 | 0 | ½ | 1 | ½ | 0 | ½ | 1 | 5.5 |
| 3 | (United States) Awonder Liang | 2677 | ½ | 0 | — | 0 | ½ | 1 | ½ | ½ | ½ | 1 | 1 | 5.5 |
| 4 | (United States) Leinier Domínguez | 2741 | ½ | 0 | 1 | — | 1 | ½ | 0 | ½ | ½ | ½ | 1 | 5.5 |
| 5 | (United States) Samuel Sevian | 2689 | ½ | 1 | ½ | 0 | — | ½ | ½ | ½ | 1 | ½ | ½ | 5.5 |
| 6 | (United States) Levon Aronian | 2738 | ½ | ½ | 0 | ½ | ½ | — | ½ | ½ | 1 | 1 | ½ | 5.5 |
| 7 | (United States) Hans Niemann | 2733 | ½ | 0 | ½ | 1 | ½ | ½ | — | ½ | ½ | ½ | 1 | 5.5 |
| 8 | (United States) Wesley So | 2751 | ½ | ½ | ½ | ½ | ½ | ½ | ½ | — | ½ | ½ | ½ | 5 |
| 9 | (United States) Sam Shankland | 2677 | 0 | 1 | ½ | ½ | 0 | 0 | ½ | ½ | — | ½ | ½ | 4 |
| 10 | (United States) Grigoriy Oparin | 2662 | 0 | ½ | 0 | ½ | ½ | 0 | ½ | ½ | ½ | — | ½ | 3.5 |
| 11 | (United States) Abhimanyu Mishra | 2630 | 0 | 0 | 0 | 0 | ½ | ½ | 0 | ½ | ½ | ½ | — | 2.5 |
| 12 | (United States) Christopher Yoo (disqualified) | 2590 | — | — | — | — | — | — | — | — | — | — | — | — |
