= Qatar Masters Open =

Chess tournament

The Qatar Masters Open is an open chess tournament organized by the Qatar Chess Association in Doha, Qatar. Its first edition took place from 25 November to 5 December 2014. It ran for two years in 2014 and 2015 before being discontinued. It was recontinued in 2023 and held in 2024, but was not held in 2025.

== Winners ==
Year	Winner
2014	Yu Yangyi (China)
2015	Magnus Carlsen (Norway)
2023	Nodirbek Yakubboev (Uzbekistan)
2024	Andrey Esipenko (FIDE)

== Qatar Masters 2014 ==
The tournament was open to players rated 2300 or above. The prize fund equaled over $100,000, with $25,000 for the winner. There were also prizes for the best female and Arab players, $5,000 and $3,500 for first place in each category, respectively.

Yu Yangyi, a 20-year-old Chinese chess prodigy, became the Qatar Masters Champion, scoring 7½/9; Anish Giri finished second and Vladimir Kramnik third, both scoring 7/9.

Place	Prize
1st	$25,000
2nd	$15,000
3rd	$10,000
4th	$7,000
5th	$6,000
6th	$5,000

== Qatar Masters 2015 ==
This was the second edition of the Qatar Masters Open, played from 20 December to 29 December, 2015. The time control was 90 minutes for the first 40 moves plus 30 minutes for the rest of the game with a 30 second increment per move starting from move 1. Tiebreak playoffs consisted of a 2-game blitz match with a time control of 5 minutes with a 3 second increment per move starting from move 1.

Magnus Carlsen was the winner of the tournament, scoring +5 (7 points out of 9) and defeating Yu Yangyi in the tiebreak. There was a 5-way tie for third place, amongst Vladimir Kramnik, Sergey Karjakin, Sanan Sjugirov, Ni Hua, and Vassily Ivanchuk. Finally, Vladimir Kramnik finished third. The prizes for the 10 best players of the tournament were as follows:

Place	Prize
1st	$27,000
2nd	$16,000
3rd	$12,000
4th	$8,500
5th	$7,500
6th	$5,500
7th	$4,500
8th	$3,500
9th	$2,500
10th	$2,000

There were additional prizes for the best female players (ranging from $500 to $8,000), best Arabic players (ranging from $1,000 to $2,500), top two junior players, and special prizes in different rating groups.

== Qatar Masters 2023 ==
In January 2023 it was announced that the tournament will come back for a 3rd edition in 2023. The organizers said they are "working to secure sponsorship for the event to run annually until 2030". The tournament was held between 10−20 October, and consisted of 9 rounds with one rest day. The tournament has a prize fund of $110,000, with $25,000 for the winner, $5,000 for the highest-scoring woman, and other prizes such as the best-scoring Arabic player and best-scoring junior. Participants included former World Champion Magnus Carlsen, five-time US Champion Hikaru Nakamura, then-reigning Dutch Champion Anish Giri, and several young talents such as Gukesh D, Nodirbek Abdusattorov, and Arjun Erigaisi. The top-seeded woman participating was Bibisara Assaubayeva of Kazakhstan.

The winner of this tournament was Nodirbek Yakubboev, who beat compatriot Nodirbek Abdusattorov in a blitz playoff for the title. As the 19th seed in the tournament, Yakubboev scored 7/9 (+5−0=4). Abdusattorov took second place, while Indian GM S. L. Narayanan finished third. The first woman's prize was won by Vaishali R, with 5/9, and the top Arabic prize went to Salem Saleh of the United Arab Emirates, who finished on 6/9. As Abdusattorov, the top junior in the tournament, had already achieved a prize, he could not receive the top junior prize, and neither could Javokhir Sindarov, Arjun Erigaisi, or Gukesh D, who finished fourth, sixth, and eighth respectively, so it is likely that the prize went instead to Nihal Sarin, the highest-performing junior who had yet to receive a greater prize than the $2,000 awarded to the top junior.

== Qatar Masters 2024 ==
The 2024 edition of the tournament was held from 3–13 December. The tournament's A group was open to players rated 2300 or higher, and consisted of a nine-round Swiss-system tournament. Participants included world number four Arjun Erigaisi and world number six Nodirbek Abdusattorov.

Shant Sargsyan was the clear leader through round 6 as the sole contestant with 5½/6. He held Arjun to a draw in the seventh round, before losing a critical game to Esipenko in the penultimate round and eventually finishing fourth with a score of 6½/9.

6th seed Andrey Esipenko won the tournament with a score of 7½/9, drawing Arjun in the final round to claim the $25,000 prize for sole first. Arjun and Abdusattorov each finished with a score of 7/9, with Arjun earning $15,000 for coming second on tiebreaks and Abdusattorov receiving $10,000. IM Polina Shuvalova claimed the $5,000 for first woman's prize with 5½/9.
