= Candidates Tournament 2024 =

Chess tournament in Toronto, Canada

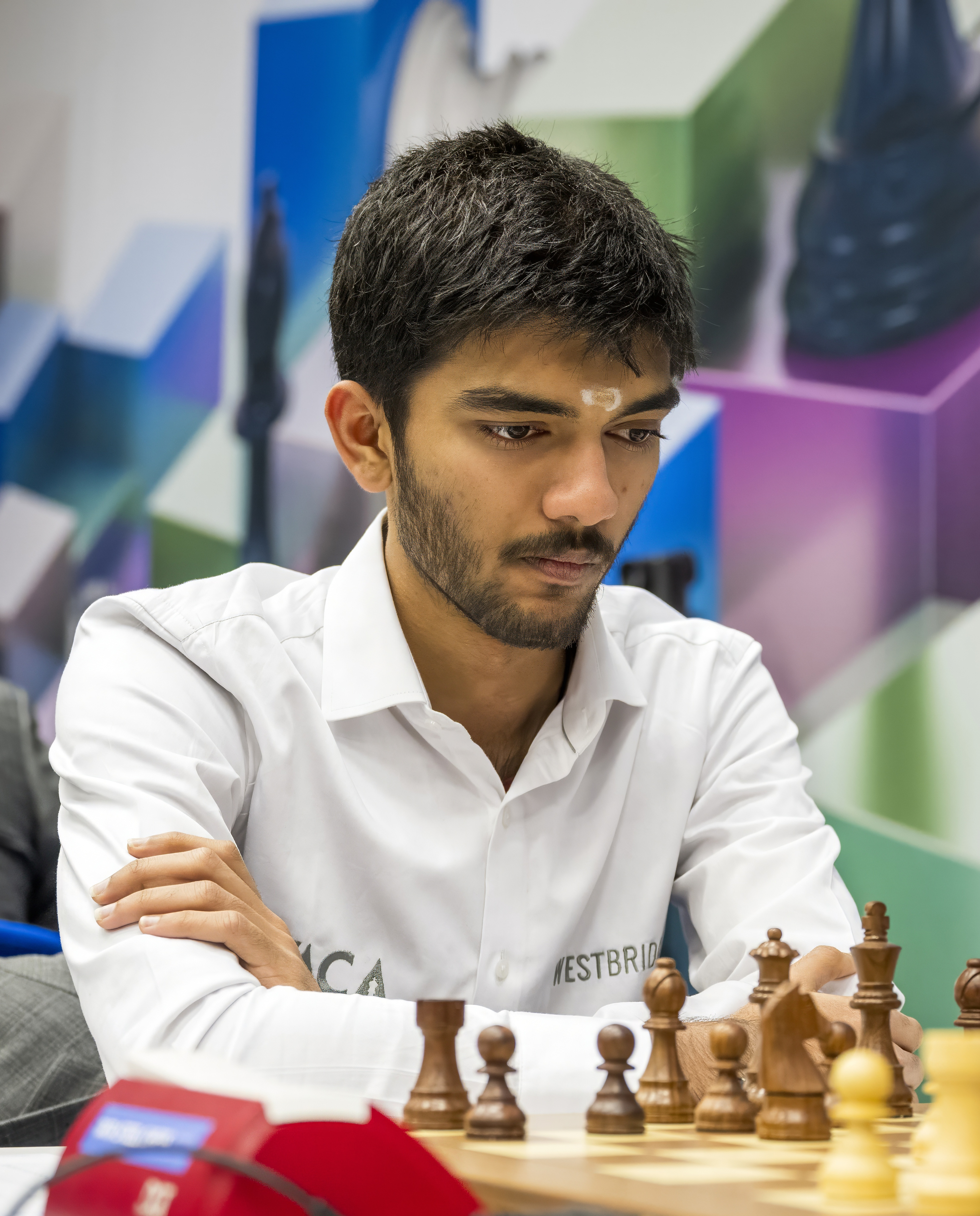
- Gukesh Dommaraju, the winner of the tournament, advanced to the World Chess Championship 2024 match.
- Venue: The Great Hall
- Location: Toronto, Canada
- Dates: 3–22 April 2024
- Competitors: 8
- Winning score: 9 points of 14

Champion
- (India) Gukesh Dommaraju

The 2024 Candidates Tournament was an eight-player chess tournament, held to determine the challenger for the World Chess Championship 2024. The tournament took place at The Great Hall in Toronto, Canada, from 3–22 April 2024. The event was held alongside the Women's Candidates Tournament. As with every Candidates tournament since 2013, it was a double round-robin tournament.

The event was won by Gukesh Dommaraju, which made him the youngest ever winner of a Candidates Tournament, and the youngest ever World Chess Championship challenger. He earned the right to play the World Chess Championship 2024 against the defending World Chess Champion Ding Liren; he went on to win and become the youngest undisputed World Chess Champion.

== Qualification ==
The qualifiers for the Candidates Tournament were:

Qualification method	Player	Age	Rating	World ranking
Qualification method	Player	(April 2024)		
2023 World Championship runner-up	(FIDE) Ian Nepomniachtchi (Note: Russian players' flags are displayed as the FIDE flag, as Russian and Belarusian flags have been banned from FIDE-rated events in response to the Russo-Ukrainian war.)	33	2758	7
The top three finishers in the Chess World Cup 2023 (Note: The regulations stated that it would be the top three finishers other than Ding and Nepomniachtchi. (And that if both finished in the top four of the World Cup, then the World Cup qualifiers would be the other two players in the top four; and two players with the highest rating in the January 2024 ranking list would qualify for the event instead of one). However neither of these players reached the World Cup semifinals: Ding elected not to play, and Nepomniachtchi lost in the fifth round.)	(Norway) ~~Magnus Carlsen~~ (winner, withdrew)	33	2830	1
The top three finishers in the Chess World Cup 2023	(India) R Praggnanandhaa (runner-up)	18	2747	14
The top three finishers in the Chess World Cup 2023	(United States) Fabiano Caruana (third place)	31	2803	2
The top three finishers in the Chess World Cup 2023	(Azerbaijan) Nijat Abasov (fourth place, replacement for Carlsen)	28	2632	114
The top two finishers in the FIDE Grand Swiss Tournament 2023	(India) Vidit Gujrathi (winner)	29	2727	25
The top two finishers in the FIDE Grand Swiss Tournament 2023	(United States) Hikaru Nakamura (runner-up)	36	2789	3
Highest place in the 2023 FIDE Circuit not already qualified (Note: Fabiano Caruana finished first in the 2023 FIDE Circuit, but had already qualified for the Candidates through a third place finish at the Chess World Cup 2023. As a result, the qualifying spot was awarded to the highest finisher of the FIDE Circuit who had not already qualified for the event (Gukesh Dommaraju).)	(India) Gukesh Dommaraju	17	2743	16
Highest rating for January 2024 not already qualified (Note: Provided the player has played at least 4 classical time control tournaments eligible for the 2023 FIDE Circuit.)	(France) Alireza Firouzja	20	2760	6

=== Withdrawal of Magnus Carlsen ===
Despite qualifying for the Candidates Tournament by winning the 2023 FIDE World Cup, former World Champion Magnus Carlsen decided not to compete in Toronto. He had previously stated his disinclination after reaching the semifinals of the World Cup, stating that "under the current format there is absolutely no chance" he will play the Candidates. In January 2024, after official confirmation of the candidates list, Magnus Carlsen formally confirmed his decision to decline FIDE's invitation to play in the Candidates Tournament by stating "I would say the main reason is that I don't enjoy it. It's as simple as that." As a result, Nijat Abasov, who finished fourth at the World Cup, qualified to the Candidates Tournament 2024 as Carlsen's replacement.

=== FIDE and Grand Chess Tour agreement ===
In April 2022, before announcing all the qualification methods, FIDE announced that the top two finishers in the 2023 Grand Chess Tour would qualify to the 2024 Candidates Tournament. FIDE promised that more details would follow, but later announced qualification paths excluding the Grand Chess Tour, without providing an explanation for the change. However, the Grand Chess Tour tournaments counted toward the qualifying path of the FIDE Circuit.

=== FIDE Rating qualifier ===
The highest rated player in the January 2024 rating list who has not yet qualified for the Candidates or World Championship, and has participated in at least four FIDE Circuit classical events, qualified for the Candidates.

The rating qualifier turned out to be hotly contested. After a poor showing in the 2023 Sinquefield Cup, rating spot front-runner Alireza Firouzja lost nearly thirteen rating points, putting him behind Wesley So in the live ratings. In an attempt to surpass So, the Chartres Chess Club organized three two-game matches between Firouzja and grandmasters Alexandre Dgebuadze (52 years old, rated 2439), Andrei Shchekachev (51 years old, rated 2506), and Sergey Fedorchuk (42 years old, rated 2546). These matches, held in Chartres, France, were collectively referred to as "Alireza Firouzja's Race to Candidates". Firouzja needed to win all six games (or win the first five and not play the sixth) to overtake So in the live ratings. He indeed won the first five games after some controversy (such as Shchekachev resigning in a position that turned out to be equal in game 3), but decided to play the sixth game anyway. In what was effectively a must-win game, Firouzja overpushed and landed in a bad endgame, but with both players in time trouble, Fedorchuk accepted Firouzja's draw offer. The 5.5/6 result still left Firouzja behind So in the live rating list.

The last-minute nature of the event as well as the hand-selecting of opponents drew criticism, including from So, who revealed he turned down similar opportunities because he disagreed with the morality of such events. Shortly after these matches were announced, FIDE affirmed that it had the right to not rate any specific event, and the United States Chess Federation called on FIDE to not rate Firouzja's games. FIDE's response drew criticism from many, including Ian Nepomniachtchi, who pointed out that Ding Liren had also played last-minute games to qualify for the Candidates Tournament 2022, to no reaction from FIDE.

On 25 December, FIDE announced new rules, effective immediately, requiring events with at least one player rated over 2700 (or at least one woman player rated over 2500) to be registered at least one month in advance; however, the rule would not be applied retroactively for Alireza Firouzja's Race to Candidates tournament. This requirement could be waived with the approval of the FIDE president or QC Chairman. That same day, Alireza Firouzja's matches (as well as another match in Chartres in which Firouzja did not play) were removed from FIDE's website.

Having fallen short, Firouzja withdrew from the World Rapid and Blitz championship to participate in the Open de Rouen tournament, which was a minor Swiss-system tournament with a top prize of €700. Firouzja won all 7 games, including a win against former world championship challenger Gata Kamsky. This gained Firouzja enough rating to surpass So on the January 2024 rating list even if the Chartres event was not rated, which turned out to be the case. Firouzja was officially confirmed as the rating qualifier on the January ratings list.

Top ten on the January 2024 rating list
Ranking	Player	Rating	Candidates	FIDE Circuit	Eligible for rating qualification
1	(Norway) Magnus Carlsen	2830	Qualified	4	No
2	(United States) Fabiano Caruana	2804	Qualified	4+	No
3	(United States) Hikaru Nakamura	2788	Qualified	4	No
4	(China) Ding Liren	2780	World Champion	2	No
5	(FIDE) Ian Nepomniachtchi	2769	Qualified	4+	No
6	(France) Alireza Firouzja	2759	Qualified	4+	Yes
7	(United States) Wesley So	2757	—	4+	Yes
8	(United States) Leinier Domínguez	2752	—	4	Yes
9	(FIDE) Sergey Karjakin	2750	—	0	No
10	(Netherlands) Anish Giri	2749	—	4+	Yes

Qualified to Candidates by rating
Qualified to Candidates by another path
Not qualified to Candidates (already World Champion)
Not qualified to Candidates

== Organization ==
The tournament was an eight-player, double round-robin tournament, meaning there were 14 rounds with each player facing each of the others twice: once with the white pieces and once with the black pieces. The tournament winner would qualify to play Ding Liren for the World Championship in 2024.

Players from the same federation were required to play each other in the first rounds of each half to discourage collusion. The players affected in the 2024 Candidates were R Praggnanandhaa, Vidit Gujrathi and Gukesh Dommaraju from India, and Fabiano Caruana and Hikaru Nakamura from the United States. The former three all faced one another in rounds 1–3 and 8–10, while the latter two faced each other in rounds 1 and 8.

FIDE announced pairings for the tournament in March 2024. The arbitration team for the event was Chief Arbiter Aris Marghetis (CAN) and Deputy Chief arbiters Carolina Solis Munoz (CRC) and Andrew Howie (SCO). Anna Burtasova served as the Press Officer.

=== Regulations ===
The time control was 120 minutes for the first 40 moves, then 30 minutes for the rest of the game, plus a 30-second increment per move starting from move 41. Players got 1 point for a win, ½ point for a draw and 0 points for a loss.

Tiebreaks for the first place would have been addressed as follows:

- If two players were tied, they would play two rapid chess games at 15 minutes plus 10 seconds per move. If a three- to six-way tie occurred, a single round-robin would be played. If seven or eight players are tied, a single round-robin would be played with a time limit of 10 minutes plus 5 seconds per move.
- If any players were tied for first after the rapid chess games, they would play two blitz chess games at 3 minutes plus 2 seconds per move. In the case of more than two players being tied, a single round-robin would be played.
- If any players were still tied for first after these blitz chess games, the remaining players would play a knock-out blitz tournament at the same time control. In each mini-match of the proposed knock-out tournament, the first player to win a game would win the mini-match.

Ties for places other than first were broken by, in order: (1) Sonneborn–Berger score; (2) total number of wins; (3) head-to-head score among tied players; (4) drawing of lots.

The prize money was €48,000 for first place, €36,000 for second place, and €24,000 for third place (with players on the same number of points sharing prize money, irrespective of tie-breaks), plus €3,500 per half-point for every player, for a total prize pool of €500,000.

=== Schedule ===
Date	Event
Wednesday, 3 April	Opening ceremony
Thursday, 4 April	Round 1
Friday, 5 April	Round 2
Saturday, 6 April	Round 3
Sunday, 7 April	Round 4
Monday, 8 April	Rest day
Tuesday, 9 April	Round 5
Wednesday, 10 April	Round 6
Thursday, 11 April	Round 7
Friday, 12 April	Rest day
Saturday, 13 April	Round 8
Sunday, 14 April	Round 9
Monday, 15 April	Round 10
Tuesday, 16 April	Rest day
Wednesday, 17 April	Round 11
Thursday, 18 April	Round 12
Friday, 19 April	Rest day
Saturday, 20 April	Round 13
Sunday, 21 April	Round 14
Monday, 22 April	Tie breaks (if required); Closing ceremony

All rounds are scheduled to start at 14:30 EDT local time (18:30 UTC).

== Results ==
=== Standings ===
Standings of the 2024 Candidates Tournament
Rank	Player	Score	SB	Wins	Qualification	GUK		NAK		NEP		CAR		PRA		VID		FIR		ABA	
1	Gukesh Dommaraju (IND)	9 / 14	57	5	Advanced to title match			½	½	½	½	½	½	½	1	½	1	1	0	1	1
2	Hikaru Nakamura (USA)	8.5 / 14	56	5		½	½			½	½	1	½	½	1	0	0	1	1	1	½
3	Ian Nepomniachtchi (FIDE)	8.5 / 14	56	3		½	½	½	½			½	½	½	½	1	1	1	½	½	½
4	Fabiano Caruana (USA)	8.5 / 14	54	4		½	½	½	0	½	½			½	1	1	½	1	½	1	½
5	R Praggnanandhaa (IND)	7 / 14	42.5	3		0	½	0	½	½	½	0	½			½	1	½	½	1	1
6	Vidit Gujrathi (IND)	6 / 14	40.25	3		0	½	1	1	0	0	½	0	0	½			1	½	½	½
7	Alireza Firouzja (FRA)	5 / 14	32.75	2		1	0	0	0	½	0	½	0	½	½	½	0			1	½
8	Nijat Abasov (AZE)	3.5 / 14	25.5	0		0	0	½	0	½	½	½	0	0	0	½	½	½	0		

Tie-breakers for first place: (1) results in tie-break games for first place;

Tie-breakers for non-first place: (1) results in tie-break games for first place, if any; (2) Sonneborn–Berger score (SB); (3) total number of wins; (4) head-to-head score among tied players; (5) drawing of lots.

Note: Numbers in the crosstable in a white background indicate the result playing the respective opponent with the white pieces (black pieces if on a black background). This does not give information which of the two games was played in the first half of the tournament, and which in the second.

=== Points by round ===
This table shows the total number of wins minus the total number of losses each player has after each round. '=' indicates the player has won and lost the same number of games after that round. Green backgrounds indicate the player(s) with the highest score after each round. Red backgrounds indicate player(s) who could no longer win the tournament after each round. (Note: Players are marked in red if there is no permutation of remaining results that allows them to catch up the tournament leader(s) after remaining rounds.)

Rank	Player	Rounds													
Rank	Player	1	2	3	4	5	6	7	8	9	10	11	12	13	14
1	Gukesh Dommaraju (IND)	=	+1	+1	+1	+2	+2	+1	+2	+2	+2	+2	+3	+4	+4
2	Hikaru Nakamura (USA)	=	−1	−1	−1	=	=	=	+1	=	+1	+2	+3	+3	+3
3	Ian Nepomniachtchi (FIDE)	=	+1	+1	+2	+2	+2	+2	+2	+2	+2	+3	+3	+3	+3
4	Fabiano Caruana (USA)	=	+1	+1	+1	+1	+1	+1	=	=	+1	+1	+2	+3	+3
5	R Praggnanandhaa (IND)	=	−1	=	=	=	+1	+1	+1	+1	+1	=	=	−1	=
6	Vidit Gujrathi (IND)	=	+1	=	−1	−1	=	=	−1	=	=	−1	−2	−2	−2
7	Alireza Firouzja (FRA)	=	−1	−1	−1	−2	−3	−2	−2	−2	−3	−2	−3	−4	−4
8	Nijat Abasov (AZE)	=	−1	−1	−1	−2	−3	−3	−3	−3	−4	−5	−6	−6	−7

=== Summary ===
A poll before the tournament of Chessbase readers found Caruana a substantial favorite. Former world champions Viswanathan Anand and Magnus Carlsen echoed this opinion, albeit also thinking that Nakamura should likewise be counted among the favorites, with Nepomniachtchi and Firouzja also in contention.

Round one resulted in all draws, albeit with some fighting chess, before the tournament burst into life in round 2. Vidit used his preparation to surprise and ultimately defeat Nakamura, while Praggnanandhaa outprepared Gukesh, but overestimated his position and ended up losing. Caruana positionally outplayed Abasov, and Nepomniachtchi–Firouzja was a back-and-forth affair that Nepomniachtchi eventually won. In round 3, Abasov and Nakamura agreed to an uneventful draw, while Gukesh was able to put Nepomniachtchi under pressure, but could not convert. Praggnanandhaa, on the other hand, launched the highly adventurous Ruy Lopez Jaenisch Gambit Deferred, catching Vidit by surprise. He managed to navigate the resulting complex and double-edged position better than Vidit, earning the only win in the round. Round 4 saw more fighting chess, but only one decisive game: Nepomniachtchi defeated Vidit in a Berlin endgame, propelling him into the sole lead.

Gujrathi–Firouzja, round 6

Position: a8 black rook, e8 black king, f8 black bishop, h8 black rook, b7 black bishop, f7 black pawn, g7 black pawn, h7 black pawn, a6 black pawn, b6 black queen, c6 black knight, d6 black pawn, e6 black pawn, f6 black knight, b5 black pawn, e4 white pawn, f4 white bishop, g4 white pawn, a3 white pawn, b3 white knight, c3 white knight, b2 white pawn, c2 white pawn, d2 white queen, e2 white bishop, f2 white pawn, h2 white pawn, c1 white king, d1 white rook, h1 white rook

Behind in development and before having castled, Firouzja played 13...Qxf2?, a move commentators variously called "suicidal" and "overly daring".

In round 5, Praggnanandhaa and Vidit got strong positions against Nepomniachtchi and Caruana respectively, but both Nepomniachtchi and Caruana managed to survive. Meanwhile, both Abasov and Firouzja made crucial mistakes in the endgame to lose. The results meant Gukesh joined Nepomniachtchi in the lead. Both Abasov and Firouzja lost again in round 6; Praggnanandhaa outplayed Abasov after a tense middlegame, while Firouzja played 13...Qxf2? (diagram) to quickly land in a losing position. GM Daniel King suggested afterwards that Firouzja might be "on tilt". In round 7, Firouzja once again landed in a difficult position, but this time found the right moves to pose problems, and Gukesh made a mistake under time pressure to give Firouzja the win. The other games ended drawn, which meant Nepomniachtchi finished the first half as the sole leader.

The second half of the tournament began with a major shakeup in the standings. Tail-ender Abasov held a draw with Black against Nepomniachtchi, while Gukesh came back from his 7th round loss by defeating Vidit Gujrathi. This meant Gukesh joined Nepomniachtchi in first place. Meanwhile, Nakamura beat Caruana to join Praggnanandhaa in third place. In round 9, Vidit defeated Nakamura while the other games ended drawn. Among them, the tensest was Firouzja–Nepomniachtchi. Firouzja came close to winning, but Nepomniachtchi defended tenaciously to draw. Nakamura bounced back immediately in the next round with a win against Abasov after getting into a bad position, while Caruana also won against Firouzja. The top-of-the-table clash in round 10 between Gukesh and Nepomniachtchi ended in a draw, leaving the two still in the lead, with Caruana, Nakamura and Praggnanandhaa half a point behind. In round 11, Nakamura defeated Praggnanandhaa, while Nepomniachtchi defeated Vidit in a complicated game where both sides had chances. Gukesh–Caruana ended in a draw, leaving Nepomniachtchi once again in sole lead.

Caruana–Nepomniachtchi, round 14

Position: b8 black king, g8 black rook, c7 black queen, b6 black pawn, h6 white queen, a5 black pawn, c5 black knight, g5 white pawn, e4 white bishop, a3 white pawn, f3 white pawn, b2 white pawn, h2 black pawn, b1 white king, h1 white rook

In this complicated position, Caruana's connected passed pawns give him a winning advantage, but the hasty 39. Bh7?! allowed 39...Rxg5! 40. Qxg5 Qxh7+ to eliminate one of the threatening passed pawns. Caruana still had an objectively winning position, but it was not easy to convert in practice.

In round 12, Nepomniachtchi drew his game, Nakamura won his third game in a row, and Gukesh and Caruana also won. This put Nepomniachtchi, Nakamura and Gukesh in a three-way tie for first, Caruana half a point behind, and no other player able to win the tournament. A critical round 13 saw Gukesh defeat Firouzja and Caruana defeat Praggnanandhaa, while Nepomniachtchi and Nakamura drew. This gave Gukesh a half-point lead over his three rivals going into the final round. The final round saw Nakamura as white against Gukesh and Caruana as white against Nepomniachtchi, with Nakamura, Caruana and Nepomniachtchi all needing to win. Gukesh and Nakamura's game ended in a draw, with neither player ever having a decisive advantage. The game between Caruana and Nepomniachtchi was far more dramatic. Caruana gained a winning advantage, but Nepomniachtchi defended stubbornly, constantly posing problems. A complicated endgame resulted in which Caruana made the last inaccuracy, and Nepomniachtchi successfully held the draw.

With the draw, Gukesh won the tournament and the right to play for the title against Ding Liren later in 2024.

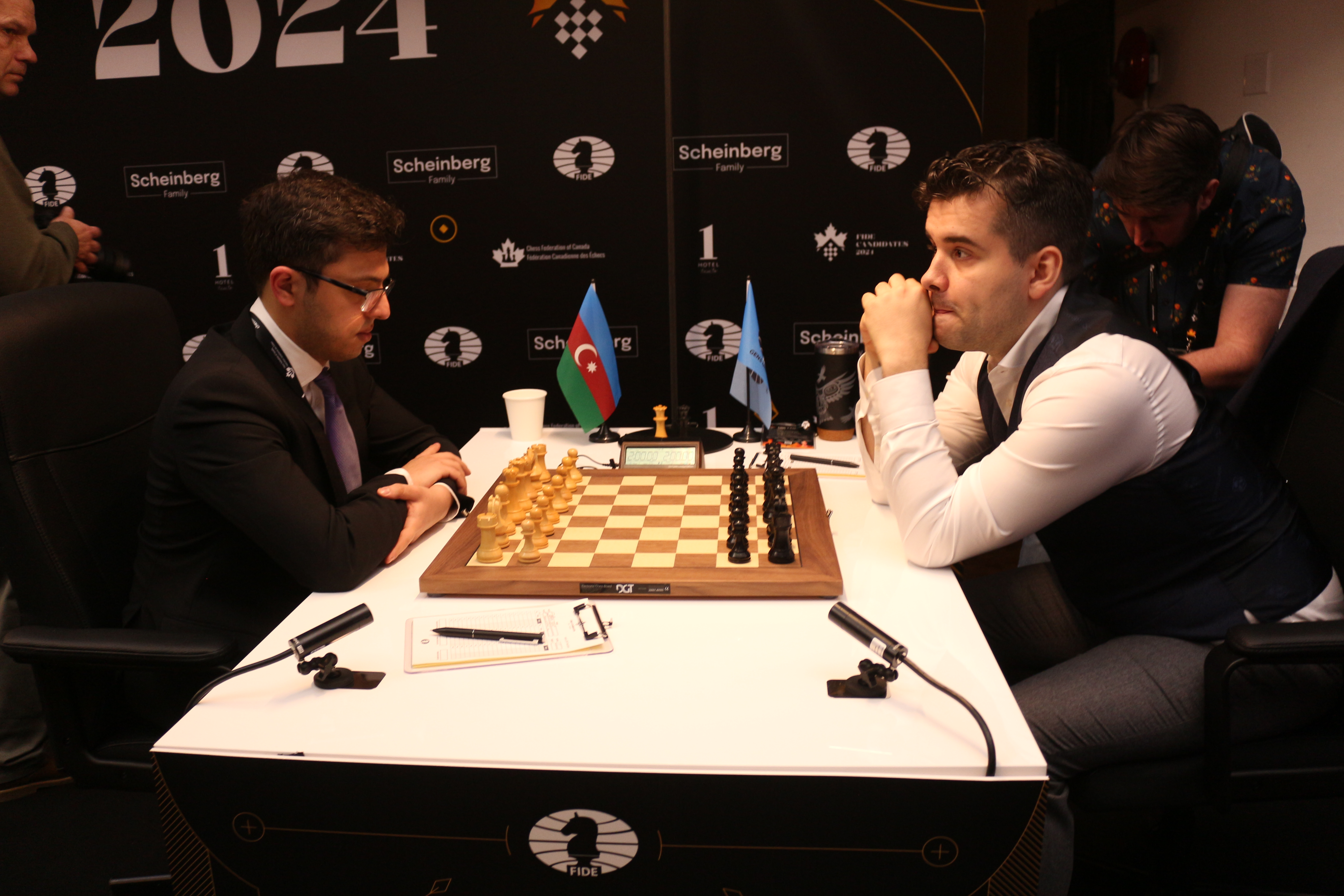
Abasov vs. Nepomniachtchi (Round 1)

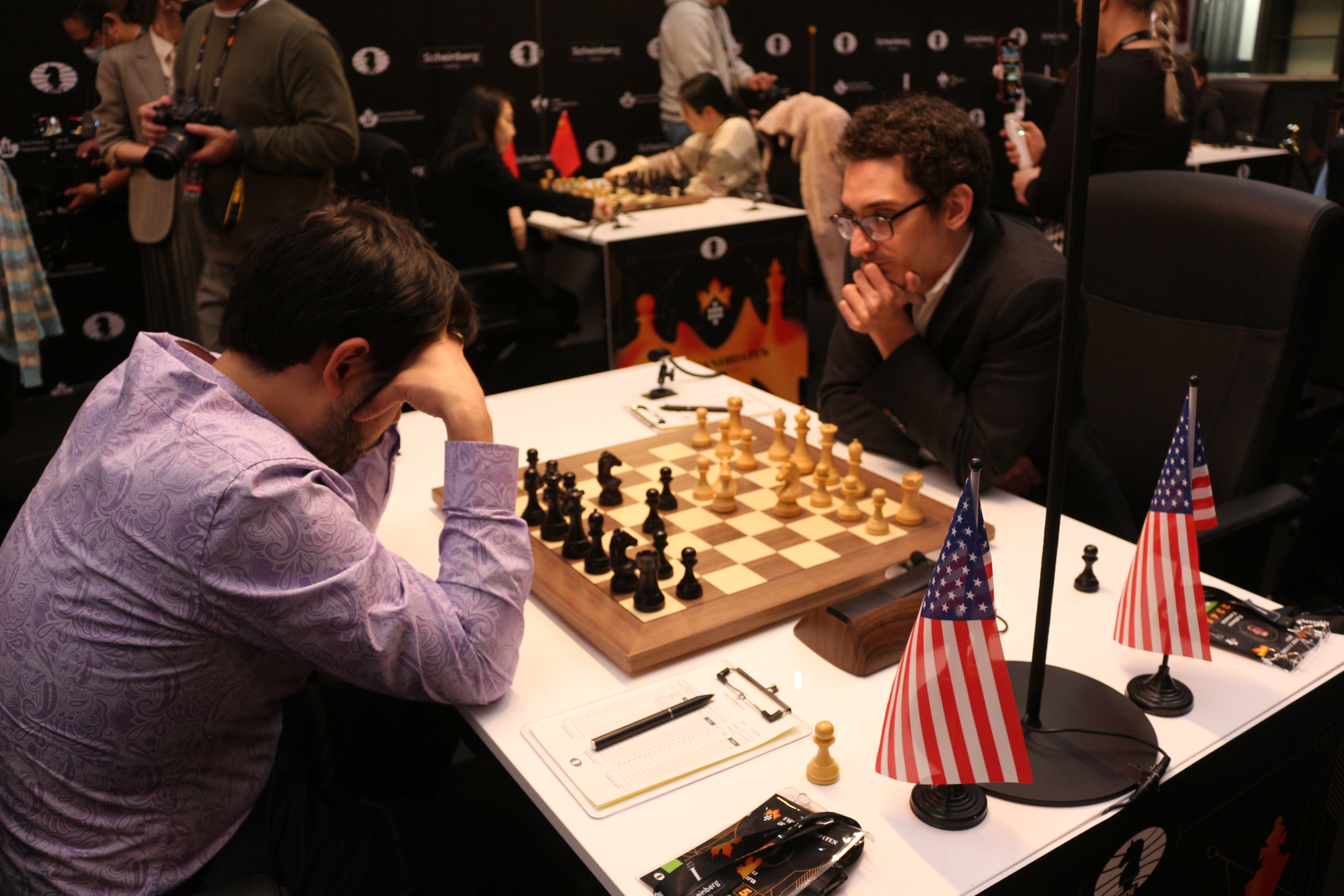
Nakamura vs. Caruana (Round 1)

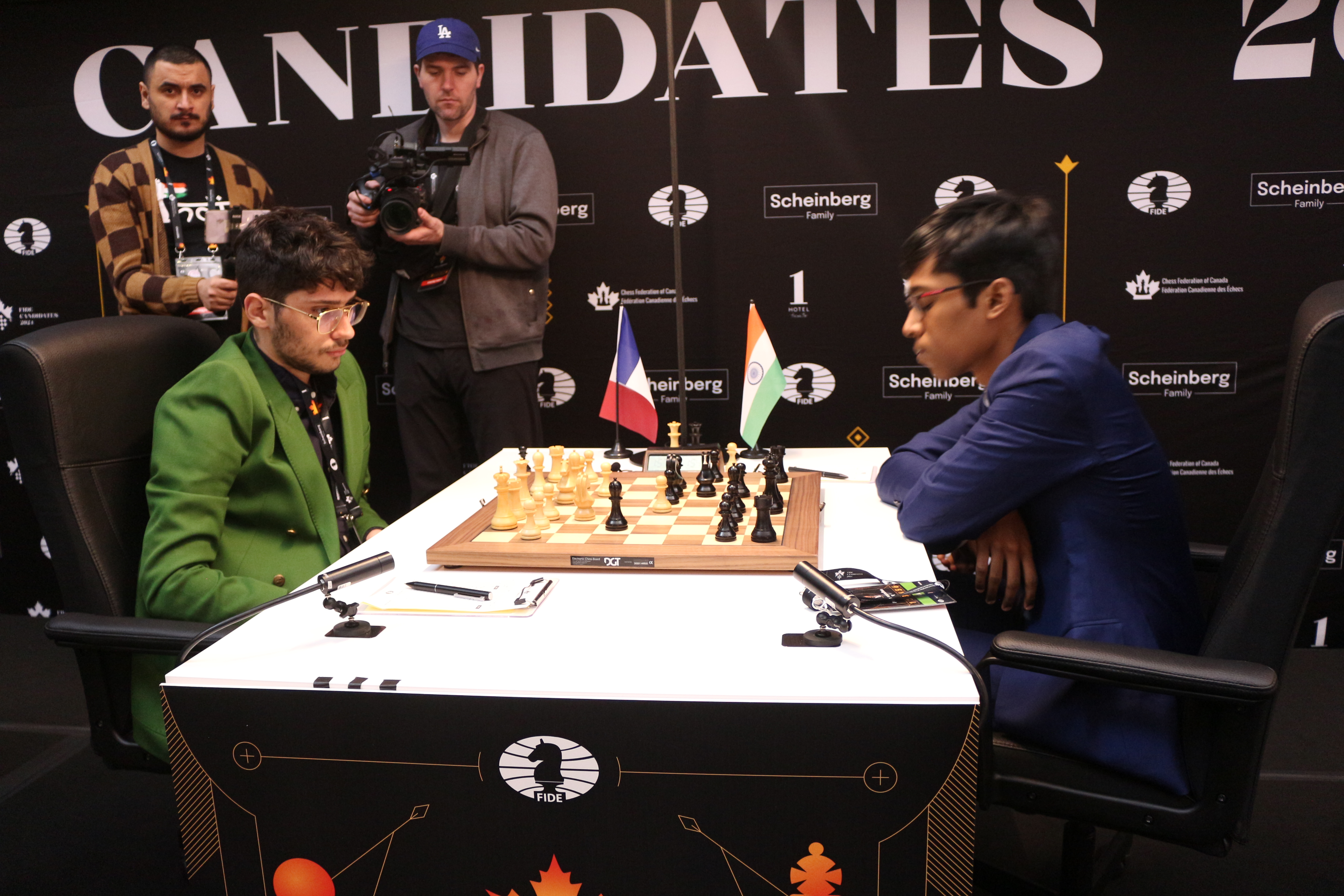
Firouzja vs. Praggnanandhaa (Round 1)

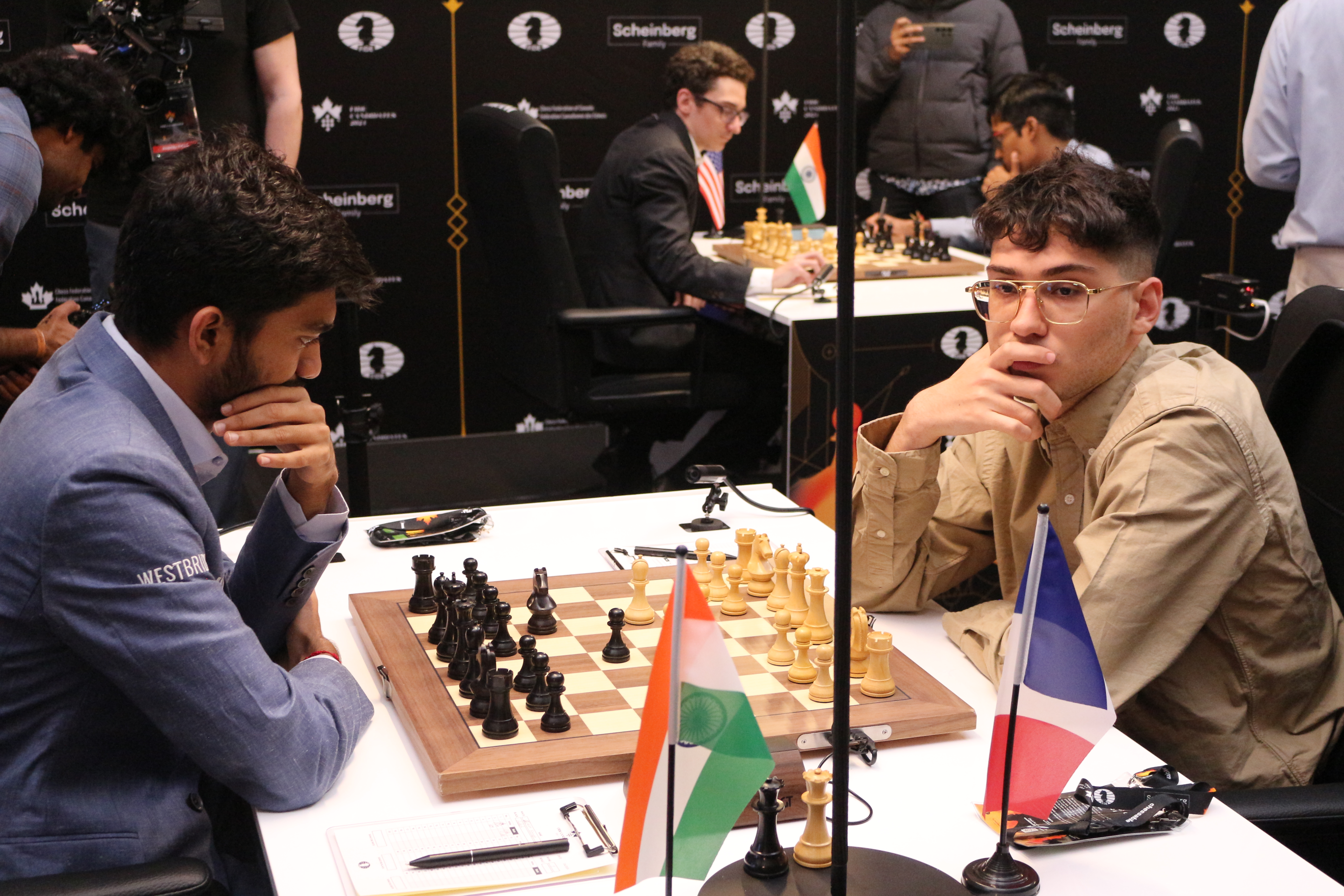
Firouzja vs. Gukesh (Round 7)

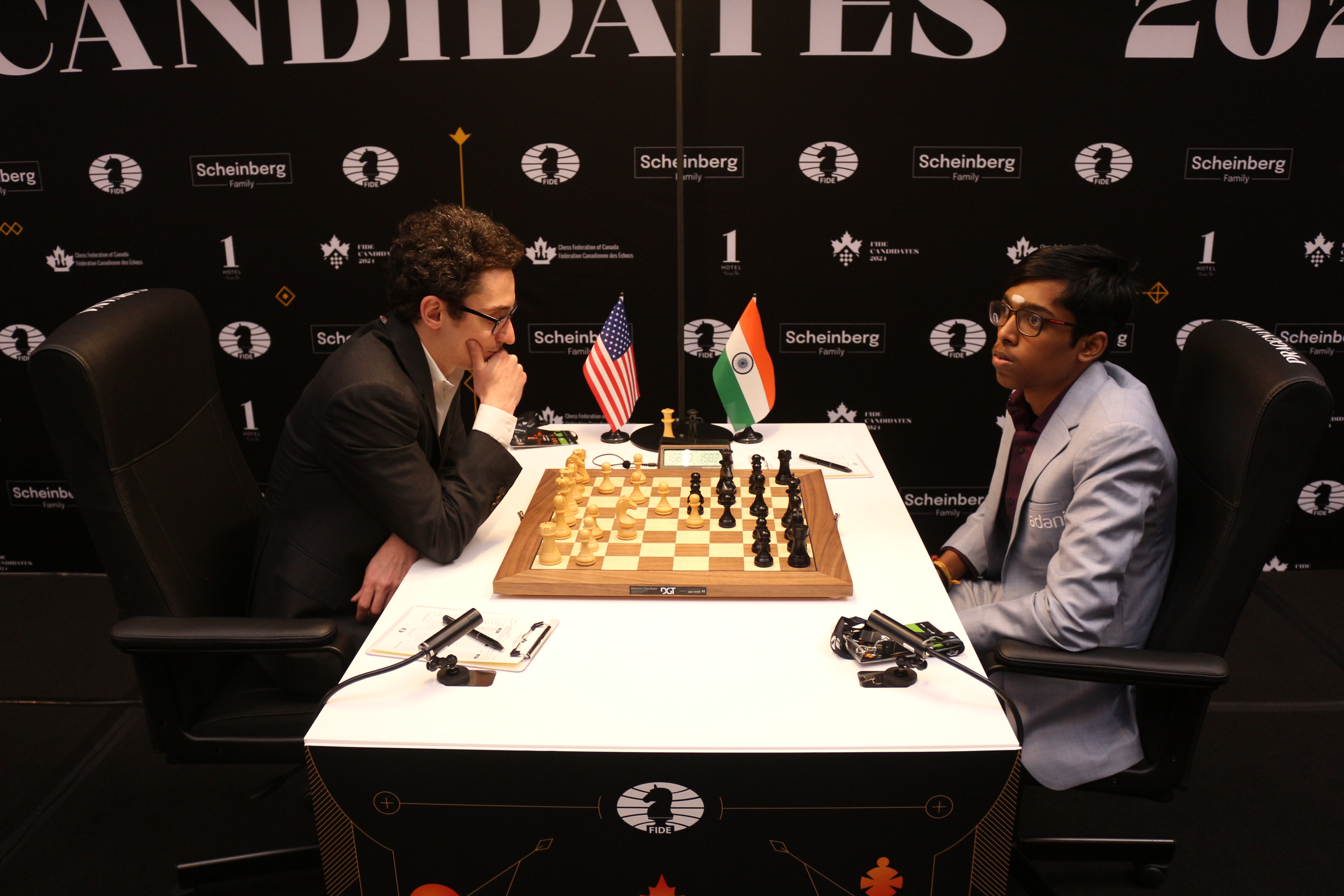
Caruana vs. Praggnanandhaa (Round 7)

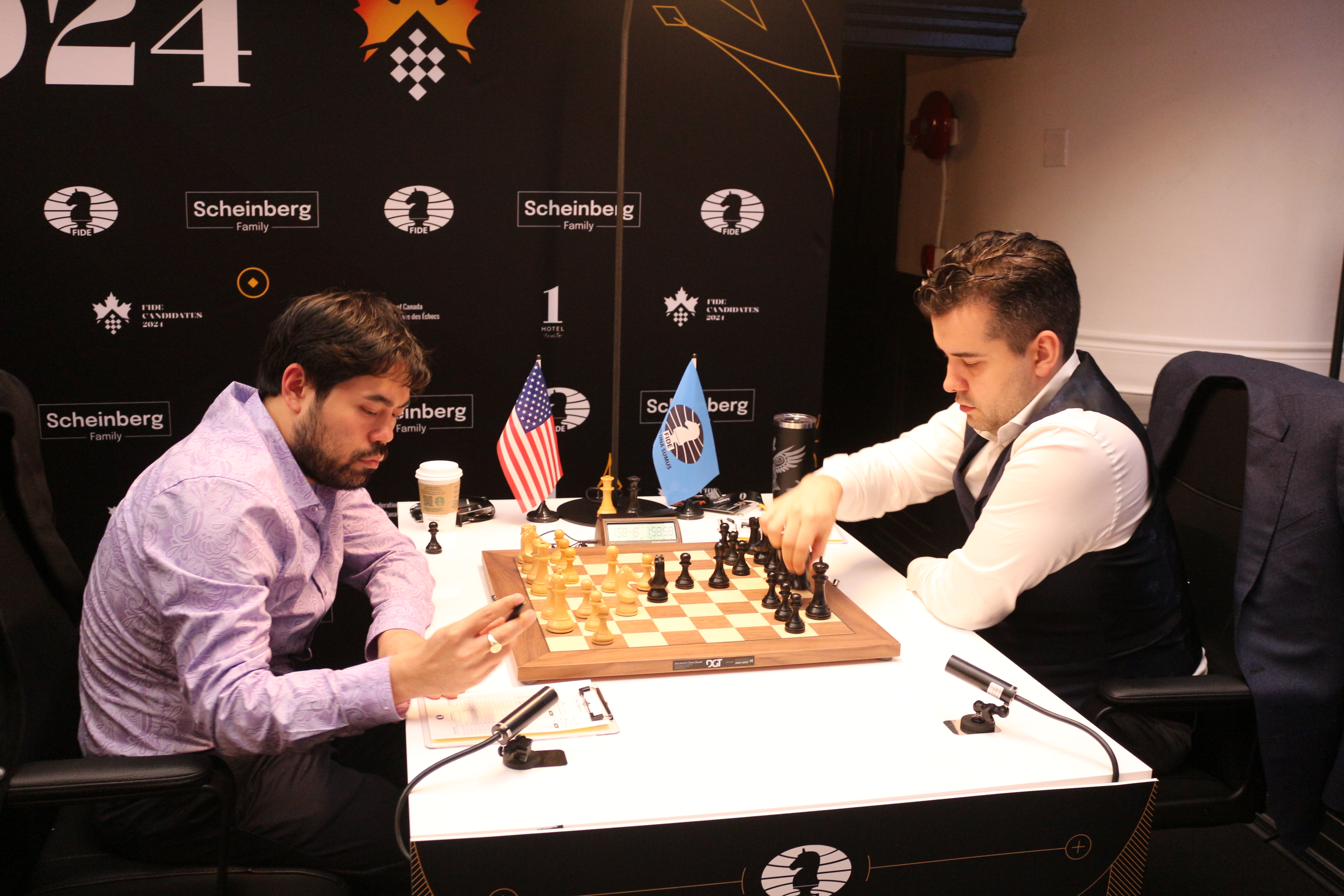
Nakamura vs. Nepomniachtchi (Round 7)

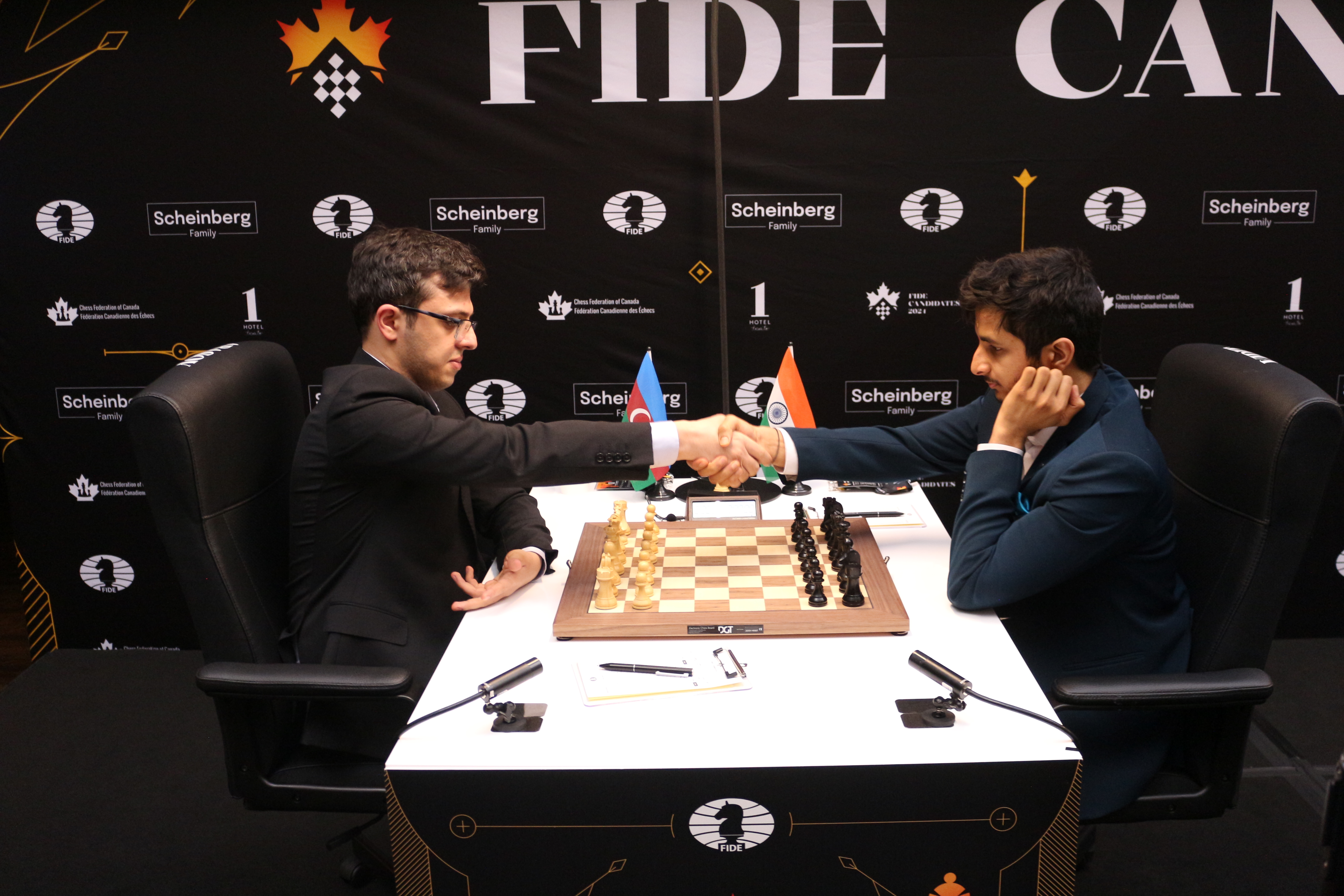
Abasov vs. Vidit (Round 7)

=== Results by round ===
Round 1 (4 April 2024) (Note: First named player is white. 1–0 indicates a white win, 0–1 indicates a black win, and ½–½ indicates a draw. Numbers in parentheses show players' scores prior to the round. Penultimate column indicates opening played, abridged from chessgames.com. Ultimate column links to match replay on chessgames.com.)
Fabiano Caruana	½–½	Hikaru Nakamura	B56 Sicilian Venice Attack
Nijat Abasov	½–½	Ian Nepomniachtchi	D53 Queen's Gambit Declined
Alireza Firouzja	½–½	R Praggnanandhaa	C83 Ruy Lopez Open
Gukesh Dommaraju	½–½	Vidit Gujrathi	D32 Symmetrical Tarrasch
Round 2 (5 April 2024)
Hikaru Nakamura (½)	0–1	Vidit Gujrathi (½)	C65 Ruy Lopez Berlin
R Praggnanandhaa (½)	0–1	Gukesh Dommaraju (½)	D30 Queen's Gambit Declined
Ian Nepomniachtchi (½)	1–0	Alireza Firouzja (½)	C65 Ruy Lopez Berlin
Fabiano Caruana (½)	1–0	Nijat Abasov (½)	B30 Sicilian Rossolimo
Round 3 (6 April 2024)
Nijat Abasov (½)	½–½	Hikaru Nakamura (½)	D10 Slav Exchange
Alireza Firouzja (½)	½–½	Fabiano Caruana (1½)	B30 Sicilian Rossolimo
Gukesh Dommaraju (1½)	½–½	Ian Nepomniachtchi (1½)	E01 Closed Catalan
Vidit Gujrathi (1½)	0–1	R Praggnanandhaa (½)	C70 Ruy Lopez Jaenisch Deferred
Round 4 (7 April 2024)
Hikaru Nakamura (1)	½–½	R Praggnanandhaa (1½)	C77 Ruy Lopez Anderssen
Ian Nepomniachtchi (2)	1–0	Vidit Gujrathi (1½)	C67 Ruy Lopez Berlin
Fabiano Caruana (2)	½–½	Gukesh Dommaraju (2)	C50 Giuoco Piano
Nijat Abasov (1)	½–½	Alireza Firouzja (1)	E32 Nimzo-Indian Classical
Round 5 (9 April 2024)
Alireza Firouzja (1½)	0–1	Hikaru Nakamura (1½)	C54 Giuoco Pianissimo
Gukesh Dommaraju (2½)	1–0	Nijat Abasov (1½)	C43 Petrov Steinitz
Vidit Gujrathi (1½)	½–½	Fabiano Caruana (2½)	B30 Sicilian Rossolimo
R Praggnanandhaa (2)	½–½	Ian Nepomniachtchi (3)	C42 Petrov Classical
Round 6 (10 April 2024)
Gukesh Dommaraju (3½)	½–½	Hikaru Nakamura (2½)	B27 Sicilian Hyperaccelerated Dragon
Vidit Gujrathi (2)	1–0	Alireza Firouzja (1½)	B57 Sicilian Anti-Sozin
R Praggnanandhaa (2½)	1–0	Nijat Abasov (1½)	D32 Symmetrical Tarrasch
Ian Nepomniachtchi (3½)	½–½	Fabiano Caruana (3)	C47 Scotch Four Knights
Round 7 (11 April 2024)
Hikaru Nakamura (3)	½–½	Ian Nepomniachtchi (4)	C42 Petrov Classical
Fabiano Caruana (3½)	½–½	R Praggnanandhaa (3½)	C02 French Advance
Nijat Abasov (1½)	½–½	Vidit Gujrathi (3)	C65 Ruy Lopez Berlin
Alireza Firouzja (1½)	1–0	Gukesh Dommaraju (4)	A45 London System
Round 8 (13 April 2024)
Hikaru Nakamura (3½)	1–0	Fabiano Caruana (4)	C77 Ruy Lopez Anderssen
Ian Nepomniachtchi (4½)	½–½	Nijat Abasov (2)	C01 French Exchange
R Praggnanandhaa (4)	½–½	Alireza Firouzja (2½)	B47 Sicilian Taimanov
Vidit Gujrathi (3½)	0–1	Gukesh Dommaraju (4)	C55 Two Knights Defense
Round 9 (14 April 2024)
Vidit Gujrathi (3½)	1–0	Hikaru Nakamura (4½)	C55 Two Knights Defense
Gukesh Dommaraju (5)	½–½	R Praggnanandhaa (4½)	C77 Ruy Lopez Anderssen
Alireza Firouzja (3)	½–½	Ian Nepomniachtchi (5)	A06 Nimzowitsch–Larsen Attack
Nijat Abasov (2½)	½–½	Fabiano Caruana (4)	D31 Queen's Gambit Declined
Round 10 (15 April 2024)
Hikaru Nakamura (4½)	1–0	Nijat Abasov (3)	C01 French Exchange
Fabiano Caruana (4½)	1–0	Alireza Firouzja (3½)	B90 Sicilian Najdorf
Ian Nepomniachtchi (5½)	½–½	Gukesh Dommaraju (5½)	C70 Ruy Lopez Cozio
R Praggnanandhaa (5)	½–½	Vidit Gujrathi (4½)	C65 Ruy Lopez Berlin
Round 11 (17 April 2024)
R Praggnanandhaa (5½)	0–1	Hikaru Nakamura (5½)	D02 Queen's Pawn Game
Vidit Gujrathi (5)	0–1	Ian Nepomniachtchi (6)	C42 Petrov Paulsen Attack
Gukesh Dommaraju (6)	½–½	Fabiano Caruana (5½)	D37 Queen's Gambit Declined
Alireza Firouzja (3½)	1–0	Nijat Abasov (3)	A04 Nimzowitsch–Larsen Attack
Round 12 (18 April 2024)
Hikaru Nakamura (6½)	1–0	Alireza Firouzja (4½)	C01 French Exchange
Nijat Abasov (3)	0–1	Gukesh Dommaraju (6½)	E32 Nimzo-Indian Classical
Fabiano Caruana (6)	1–0	Vidit Gujrathi (5)	C54 Giuoco Piano
Ian Nepomniachtchi (7)	½–½	R Praggnanandhaa (5½)	C01 French Exchange
Round 13 (20 April 2024)
Ian Nepomniachtchi (7½)	½–½	Hikaru Nakamura (7½)	C70 Ruy Lopez Classical Deferred
R Praggnanandhaa (6)	0–1	Fabiano Caruana (7)	B30 Sicilian Rossolimo
Vidit Gujrathi (5)	½–½	Nijat Abasov (3)	C42 Petrov Classical
Gukesh Dommaraju (7½)	1–0	Alireza Firouzja (4½)	C65 Ruy Lopez Berlin
Round 14 (21 April 2024)
Hikaru Nakamura (8)	½–½	Gukesh Dommaraju (8½)	D26 Queen's Gambit Accepted
Alireza Firouzja (4½)	½–½	Vidit Gujrathi (5½)	C67 Ruy Lopez Berlin
Nijat Abasov (3½)	0–1	R Praggnanandhaa (6)	E67 King's Indian Fianchetto
Fabiano Caruana (8)	½–½	Ian Nepomniachtchi (8)	D35 Queen's Gambit Declined

== See also ==
- Women's Candidates Tournament 2024
