= 2023 in chess =

The main events in the 2023 chess calendar are the World Chess Championship 2023 and Women's World Chess Championship 2023. The top three finishers from the Chess World Cup 2023, the winner and runner-up of the FIDE Grand Swiss Tournament 2023 and the winner of the FIDE Circuit 2023 will qualify for the Candidates Tournament 2024. FIDE Circuit is the new path to qualify for the Candidates Tournament. One player who would achieve the highest results during 2023 in eligible tournaments gets the spot in the Candidates. The final score is calculated as the sum of the player's five highest scores.

== 2023 tournaments ==
FIDE World Championship cycle events are highlighted in bold.

Tournament	City	System	Dates	Players (2700+)	Winner	Runner-up	Third
Tata Steel Masters	(Netherlands) Wijk aan Zee	Round robin	13–29 Jan	14 (11)	(Netherlands) Anish Giri	(Uzbekistan) Nodirbek Abdusattorov	(Norway) Magnus Carlsen
Tata Steel Challengers	(Netherlands) Wijk aan Zee	Round robin	13–29 Jan	14 (0)	(Germany) Alexander Donchenko	(Turkey) Mustafa Yılmaz	(Uzbekistan) Javokhir Sindarov
WR Chess Masters	(Germany) Düsseldorf	Round robin	15–26 Feb	10 (7)	Levon Aronian	(India) Gukesh D	(FIDE) Ian Nepomniachtchi
European Individual Chess Championship	(Serbia) Vrnjacka Banja	Swiss	3–13 Mar	484 (0)	(FIDE) Alexey Sarana	(Romania) Kirill Shevchenko	(Belgium) Daniel Dardha
American Cup	(United States) St. Louis	Double-elimination	17–26 Mar	8 (7)	(United States) Hikaru Nakamura	(United States) Wesley So	Levon Aronian
Reykjavik Open	(Iceland) Reykjavík	Swiss	29 Mar – 4 Apr	401 (0)	(Sweden) Nils Grandelius	(Turkey) Mustafa Yılmaz	(India) Abhijeet Gupta
**World Chess Championship 2023**	**(Kazakhstan) Astana**	**Match**	**9–30 Apr**	**2 (2)**	**(China) Ding Liren**	**(FIDE) Ian Nepomniachtchi**	—
Menorca Open	(Spain) Menorca	Swiss	11–16 Apr	200 (2)	(India) Gukesh D	(India) Pranav V	(Netherlands) Jorden van Foreest
TePe Sigeman & Co	(Sweden) Malmö	Round robin	4–10 May	8 (3)	(FIDE) Peter Svidler	(India) Gukesh D	(United States) Abhimanyu Mishra
Superbet Chess Classic	(Romania) Bucharest	Round robin	6–15 May	10 (10)	(United States) Fabiano Caruana	(France) Alireza Firouzja	(United States) Wesley So
Sharjah Masters	(United Arab Emirates) Sharjah	Swiss	17–25 May	78 (8)	(India) Arjun Erigaisi	(United States) Samuel Sevian	(India) Gukesh D
Dubai Open	(United Arab Emirates) Dubai	Swiss	27 May – 4 Jun	86 (3)	(India) Aravindh Chithambaram	(Uzbekistan) Javokhir Sindarov	(India) Arjun Erigaisi
Norway Chess	(Norway) Stavanger	Round robin	30 May – 9 Jun	10 (9)	(United States) Hikaru Nakamura	(United States) Fabiano Caruana	(India) Gukesh D
Prague Chess Festival	(Czech Republic) Prague	Round robin	21–30 Jun	10 (3)	(United States) Ray Robson	(Romania) Bogdan-Daniel Deac	(India) Pentala Harikrishna
No Castling World Masters	(Germany) Dortmund	Round robin	26 Jun – 2 Jul	4 (2)	(United States) Fabiano Caruana	(FIDE) Vladimir Kramnik	(Germany) Dmitrij Kollars
Dutch Championship	(Netherlands) Utrecht	Single-elimination	2–9 Jul	13 (1)	(Netherlands) Anish Giri	(Netherlands) Jorden van Foreest	(Netherlands) Erwin l'Ami (Netherlands) Max Warmerdam
Geza Hetenyi Memorial	(Hungary) Budapest	Round robin	11–19 Jul	10 (4)	(India) R Praggnanandhaa	(Iran) Amin Tabatabaei	(FIDE) Sanan Sjugirov
Biel Grandmaster Triathlon	(Switzerland) Biel	Round robin	16–26 Jul	8 (4)	(Vietnam) Le Quang Liem	(Germany) Vincent Keymer	(Czech Republic) David Navara
**Chess World Cup**	**(Azerbaijan) Baku**	**Single-elimination**	**30 Jul – 24 Aug**	**206 (25)**	**(Norway) Magnus Carlsen**	**(India) R Praggnanandhaa**	**(United States) Fabiano Caruana**
Russian Superfinal	(FIDE) Saint Petersburg	Round robin	1–12 Oct	12 (1)	(FIDE) Vladislav Artemiev	(FIDE) Pavel Ponkratov	(FIDE) Maxim Matlakov
US Chess Championship	(United States) St. Louis	Round robin	5–17 Oct	12 (4)	(United States) Fabiano Caruana	(United States) Wesley So	(United States) Leinier Domínguez
Qatar Masters	(Qatar) Doha	Swiss	11–20 Oct	158 (9)	(Uzbekistan) Nodirbek Yakubboev	(Uzbekistan) Nodirbek Abdusattorov	(United States) Hikaru Nakamura
**FIDE Grand Swiss**	**(Isle of Man) Douglas**	**Swiss**	**25 Oct – 5 Nov**	**114 (20)**	**(India) Vidit Santosh Gujrathi**	**(United States) Hikaru Nakamura**	**(FIDE) Andrey Esipenko**
Sinquefield Cup	(United States) St. Louis	Round robin	21–30 Nov	9 (9)	(United States) Fabiano Caruana	(United States) Leinier Domínguez	(United States) Wesley So
London Chess Classic	(England) London	Round robin	1–10 Dec	10 (2)	(England) Michael Adams	(Iran) Amin Tabatabaei	(India) Gukesh D
Chennai Grand Masters	(India) Chennai	Round robin	15–21 Dec	8 (5)	(India) Gukesh D	(India) Arjun Erigaisi	(India) Pentala Harikrishna

=== Women's tournaments ===
Tournament	City	System	Dates	Players (2500+)	Winner	Runner-up	Third
FIDE Women's Grand Prix Munich	(Germany) Munich	Round robin	1–14 Feb	12 (7)	(Switzerland) Alexandra Kosteniuk	(India) Koneru Humpy	(Georgia (country)) Nana Dzagnidze
European Women's Chess Championship	(Montenegro) Petrovac	Swiss	18–29 Mar	136 (0)	(Georgia (country)) Meri Arabidze	(Poland) Oliwia Kiołbasa	(Poland) Aleksandra Maltsevskaya
FIDE Women's Grand Prix New Delhi	(India) New Delhi	Round robin	24 Mar – 6 Apr	10 (5)	(FIDE) Aleksandra Goryachkina	(Kazakhstan) Bibisara Assaubayeva	(China) Zhu Jiner
Women's Candidates Tournament Final	(China) Chongqing	Match	27 Mar – 6 Apr	2 (2)	(China) Lei Tingjie	(China) Tan Zhongyi	—
FIDE Women's Grand Prix Nicosia	(Cyprus) Nicosia	Round robin	15–28 May	12 (6)	(Germany) Dinara Wagner	(India) Harika Dronavalli	(FIDE) Polina Shuvalova
Cairns Cup	(United States) St. Louis	Round robin	3–13 Jun	10 (4)	(United States) Anna Zatonskih	(Switzerland) Alexandra Kosteniuk	(Georgia (country)) Bella Khotenashvili
Women's World Chess Championship 2023	(China) Shanghai & Chongqing	Match	5–24 Jul	2 (2)	(China) Ju Wenjun	(China) Lei Tingjie	—
Women's Chess World Cup	(Azerbaijan) Baku	Single Elimination, Knockout	30 Jul - 21 Aug	103 (10)	(FIDE) Aleksandra Goryachkina	(Bulgaria) Nurgyul Salimova	(Ukraine) Anna Muzychuk
FIDE Women's Grand Swiss	(Isle of Man) Douglas	Swiss	25 Oct - 5 Nov	50 (7)	(India) Vaishali Rameshbabu	(Ukraine) Anna Muzychuk	(China) Tan Zhongyi

=== Rapid & Blitz tournaments ===
Tournament	City	System	Dates	Players (2700+)	Winner	Runner-up	Third
Armageddon Asia & Oceania	(Germany) Berlin	Double-elimination	3–9 Apr	8 (7)	(India) Gukesh D	(Uzbekistan) Nodirbek Abdusattorov	(FIDE) Vladimir Kramnik
Satty Zhuldyz Rapid & Blitz	(Kazakhstan) Astana	Round robin	20–25 Apr	12 (5)	Levon Aronian	(India) Arjun Erigaisi	(Armenia) Haik Martirosyan
Salamanca Chess Festival	(Spain) Salamanca	Round robin	26–29 Apr	8 (1)	(FIDE) Kirill Alekseenko	(Spain) Jaime Santos Latasa	(Ukraine) Vasyl Ivanchuk
Bucharest Grand Prix Rapid	(Romania) Bucharest	Swiss	29–30 Apr	317 (2)	(FIDE) Maksim Chigaev	(Romania) Bogdan-Daniel Deac	(India) Pentala Harikrishna
Superbet Rapid & Blitz Poland	(Poland) Warsaw	Round robin	17–24 May	10 (8)	(Norway) Magnus Carlsen	Jan-Krzysztof Duda	(United States) Wesley So
Norway Chess Blitz	(Norway) Stavanger	Round robin	29 May	10 (9)	(Uzbekistan) Nodirbek Abdusattorov	(France) Alireza Firouzja	(Azerbaijan) Shakhriyar Mamedyarov
Armageddon Europe & Africa	(Germany) Berlin	Double-elimination	12–18 Jun	8 (4)	(Romania) Richárd Rapport	Jan-Krzysztof Duda	(France) Maxime Vachier-Lagrave
SuperUnited Rapid & Blitz Croatia	(Croatia) Zagreb	Round robin	5–9 Jul	10 (8)	(Norway) Magnus Carlsen	(FIDE) Ian Nepomniachtchi	(France) Alireza Firouzja
Tata Steel India Rapid	(India) Kolkata	Round robin	5–7 Sep	10 (10)	(France) Maxime Vachier-Lagrave	(Azerbaijan) Teimour Radjabov	(India) R Praggnanandhaa
Tata Steel India Blitz	(India) Kolkata	Round robin	8–9 Sep	10 (10)	(FIDE) Alexander Grischuk	(Uzbekistan) Nodirbek Abdusattorov	(India) R Praggnanandhaa
Armageddon Grand Finale	(Germany) Berlin	Double-elimination	14–20 Sep	8 (5)	Jan-Krzysztof Duda	(United States) Wesley So	(Uzbekistan) Nodirbek Abdusattorov
Levitov Chess Week	(Netherlands) Amsterdam	Round robin	22–26 Sep	10 (8)	(FIDE) Ian Nepomniachtchi	(FIDE) Peter Svidler (United States) Levon Aronian	—
Saint Louis Rapid & Blitz	(United States) Saint Louis	Round robin	14–18 Nov	10 (7)	(United States) Fabiano Caruana	(France) Maxime Vachier-Lagrave	(FIDE) Ian Nepomniachtchi
Vugar Gashimov Memorial	(Azerbaijan) Gabala	Round robin	8–11 Dec	10 (5)	(India) Vidit Santosh Gujrathi	(India) Arjun Erigaisi	(Romania) Richárd Rapport
World Rapid Chess Championship 2023	(Uzbekistan) Samarkand	Swiss	26–28 Dec	202 (14)	(Norway) Magnus Carlsen	(Slovenia) Vladimir Fedoseev	(China) Yu Yangyi
World Blitz Chess Championship 2023	(Uzbekistan) Samarkand	Swiss	29–30 Dec	206 (17)	(Norway) Magnus Carlsen	(FIDE) Daniil Dubov	(FIDE) Vladislav Artemiev

== Deaths ==
- 7 February — Luc Winants
- 14 March — Nukhim Rashkovsky
- 1 April — Włodzimierz Schmidt
- 11 May — András Adorján
- 11 May — Sue Maroroa
- 5 June — Vadim Malakhatko
- 9 August — Aleksandar Matanović
- 17 December — Nikola Padevsky

== See also ==
- Champions Chess Tour 2023
- Grand Chess Tour 2023
- FIDE Grand Prix
- Pro Chess League
- Dortmund Sparkassen Chess Meeting
- Global Chess League
- FIDE World Rapid Team Championship
