= 2023 FIDE Circuit =

Series of chess tournaments

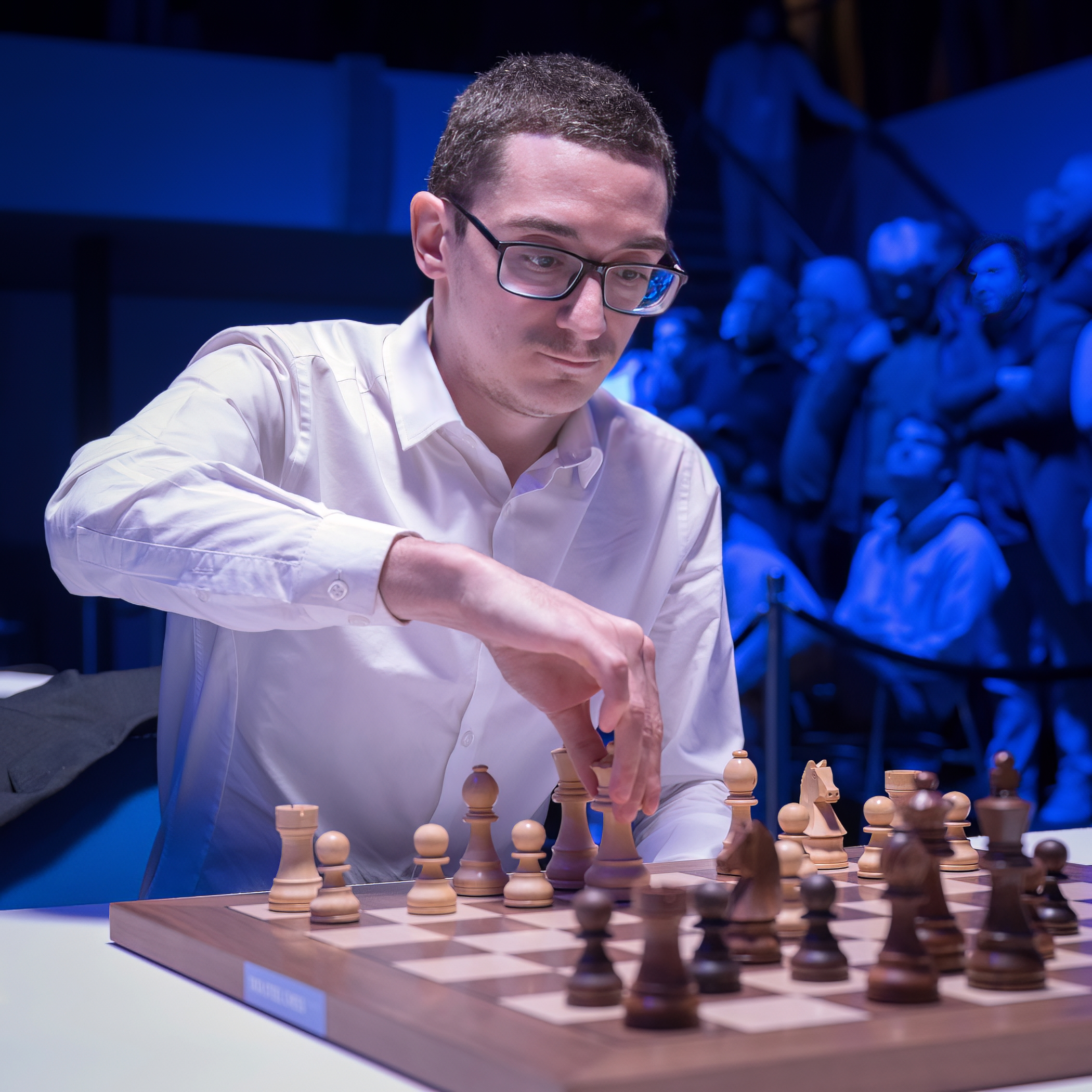
- 2023 FIDE Circuit winner Fabiano Caruana
- Duration: 22 December 2022 – 30 December 2023
- Winner: (United States) Fabiano Caruana
- Runner-Up (Candidates qualifier): (India) Gukesh Dommaraju

Seasons
- 2024 →

The 2023 FIDE Circuit was a system comprising the top chess tournaments in 2023, which served as a qualification path for the Candidates Tournament 2024. Players received points based on their performance and the strength of the tournament. A player's final Circuit score was the sum of their five best results of the year. The winner of the Circuit qualified for the Candidates Tournament 2024 in Toronto, Canada, the winner of which qualified for the World Chess Championship 2024.

Since the winner of the Circuit (Fabiano Caruana) had already qualified to the 2024 Candidates Tournament via the Chess World Cup 2023, the second-place finisher in the Circuit, Gukesh Dommaraju, qualified to the 2024 Candidates.

== Tournament eligibility ==
A FIDE-rated individual standard tournament was eligible for the Circuit if it met the following criteria:

1. Finished in the 2023 calendar year.
2. Had at least 8 players.
3. Had at least 7 rounds (3 rounds for knockout events).
4. The 8 highest-rated players had an average standard rating of at least 2550 at the start of tournament. This average is referred to as TAR (tournament average rating).
5. Players represented at least 3 national federations.
6. Not more than 50% of the 20 highest-rated players (or all players if fewer than 20) represented one federation.

The Circuit also included the following tournaments:

- National Championships that met points 1 to 4 in the above criteria.
- World Rapid Championship.
- World Blitz Championship.
- Continental Rapid Championships.
- Continental Blitz Championships.
- Other Rapid and Blitz tournaments that meet the above criteria, except that the TAR must be at least 2700.

== Points system ==
=== Event points ===
Circuit points obtained by a player from a tournament were calculated as follows:

$$P = B \times k \times w$$

where:

- $P$ - Points obtained by player from the tournament
- $B$ - Basic points
- $k$ - Tournament strength factor, calculated as $k = (TAR-2500) / 100$
- $w$ - Tournament weighting
  - 1.0 - Standard classical tournaments
  - 0.8 - World Rapid Championships
  - 0.6 - World Blitz Championships and other Rapid tournaments
  - 0.5 - Mixed Rapid & Blitz tournaments
  - 0.4 - Blitz tournaments

=== Basic points ===
Basic points for a tournament were awarded if the players placed in (or tied for) the top 8, provided that the placing was within the top half of the tournament, or at least the third round for knockout tournaments.

1st	2nd	3rd	4th	5th	6th	7th	8th
10	8	7	6	5	4	3	2

For tied positions, basic points were calculated as 50% of points for final ranking as determined by tournament's tie-break rules, plus 50% of the sum of basic points assigned for the tied places divided by the number of tied players. If no tie-break rule was applied, basic points were shared equally among all tied players.

=== FIDE World Cup points ===
For the FIDE World Cup 2023, points were given as above with the following modifications:

- All losing quarterfinalists were given full 5 basic points.
- 2 extra points were added to the final points of all top 8 finishers.

=== Player's total and ranking ===
A player's point total for the ranking was the sum of their best 5 tournaments, of which at least 4 events had to be played with standard time controls. Players without 5 such events (for example, Leinier Domínguez and Vidit Gujrathi) were not ranked. Tournaments that could be included in player's results were as follows:

- Official FIDE tournaments.
- National Championships.
- Other eligible tournaments, limited to one event per host country.

== Tournaments ==
Eligible tournaments as of 30 December 2023.

2023 FIDE Circuit - Eligible Tournaments
Tournament	Location	Date	Type	TAR	Winner
Indian Chess Championship	(India) New Delhi	22 December, 2022 – 3 January, 2023	National	2564 1/4	(India) Karthik Venkataraman
Rilton Cup	(Sweden) Stockholm	27 December, 2022 – 5 January, 2023		2567 5/8	(India) Pranesh M
Armenian Chess Championship	(Armenia) Yerevan	13–21 January	National	2574	(Armenia) Samvel Ter-Sahakyan
Azerbaijani Chess Championship	(Azerbaijan) Baku	13–26 January	National	2568 1/4	(Azerbaijan) Vasif Durarbayli
Tata Steel Masters	(Netherlands) Wijk aan Zee	13–29 January		2770	(Netherlands) Anish Giri
Tata Steel Challengers	(Netherlands) Wijk aan Zee	13–29 January		2633 1/4	(Germany) Alexander Donchenko
Floripa Open	(Brazil) Florianópolis	23–29 January		2557 3/8	(Argentina) Alan Pichot
WR Chess Masters	(Germany) Düsseldorf	15–26 February		2743 1/4	(United States) Levon Aronian
Open International de Cappelle la Grande	(France) Cappelle-la-Grande	18–24 February		2564 1/4	(India) S. P. Sethuraman
European Individual Chess Championship	(Serbia) Vrnjačka Banja	3–13 March	Continental; FIDE	2685 5/8	(FIDE) Alexey Sarana (Note: Russian players' flags are displayed as the FIDE flag, as Russian and Belarusian flags have been banned from FIDE-rated events in response to the Russian invasion of Ukraine.)
Delhi Open	(India) New Delhi	23–30 March		2579 7/8	(India) Aravindh Chithambaram
Reykjavik Open	(Iceland) Reykjavík	29 March – 4 April		2630 1/4	(Sweden) Nils Grandelius
Fagernes Chess International	(Norway) Fagernes	2–9 April		2575 1/2	(Turkey) Vahap Şanal
International Mexican Open Chess Championship	Mexico City	4–9 April		2568 5/8	(Peru) Jose Eduardo Martinez Alcantara
Open Internacional de Ajedrez Semana Santa	(Spain) La Nucia	5–10 April		2585 3/8	(Ukraine) Yuri Solodovnichenko
The Spring Classic	(United States) St. Louis	5–13 April		2634 3/4	(Netherlands) Benjamin Bok
Open Internacional Chess Menorca	(Spain) Menorca	11–16 April		2660 1/2	(India) Gukesh Dommaraju
Polish Chess Championship	(Poland) Warsaw	12–20 April	National	2604 7/8	(Poland) Bartosz Soćko
Sunway Formentera International Chess Festival	(Spain) Formentera	18–28 April		2613 3/8	(FIDE) Vladimir Fedoseev
Kazakhstan Chess Cup	(Kazakhstan) Astana	23–30 April		2635 3/8	(Kazakhstan) Aldiyar Ansat
Satty Zhuldyz Masters	(Kazakhstan) Astana	24–25 April	Rapid & Blitz	2707 1/4	(United States) Levon Aronian
Stepan Avagyan Memorial	(Armenia) Jermuk	2–12 May		2656 1/4	(United States) Samuel Sevian
Capablanca Memorial	(Cuba) Havana	3–11 May		2593 7/8	(Denmark) Jonas Buhl Bjerre
TePe Sigeman & Co chess tournament	(Sweden) Malmö	4–10 May		2674 5/8	(FIDE) Peter Svidler
Baku Open	(Azerbaijan) Baku	4–12 May		2649 3/4	(India) Leon Luke Mendonca
GCT Superbet Chess Classic Romania	(Romania) Bucharest	4–16 May		2768 3/8	(United States) Fabiano Caruana
American Continental Chess Championship	(Dominican Republic) Juan Dolio	15–23 May	Continental; FIDE	2602 1/2	(Uruguay) Georg Meier
Sharjah Masters	(United Arab Emirates) Sharjah	16–26 May		2718 7/8	(India) Arjun Erigaisi
GCT Superbet Rapid & Blitz Poland	(Poland) Warsaw	19–26 May	Rapid & Blitz	2754 5/8	(Norway) Magnus Carlsen
Cherry Blossom Classic	(United States) Dulles, Virginia	24–29 May		2572 1/8	(Azerbaijan) Vasif Durarbayli (FIDE) Mikhail Antipov
Norway Chess Open	(Norway) Stavanger	27 May – 3 June		2562 1/4	(Sweden) Platon Galperin
Norway Chess Blitz	(Norway) Stavanger	27 May – 3 June	Blitz	2771 7/8	(Uzbekistan) Nodirbek Abdusattorov
Dubai Open	(United Arab Emirates) Dubai	27 May – 4 June		2681 1/2	(India) Aravindh Chithambaram
Norway Chess – Main Tournament	(Norway) Stavanger	27 May – 9 June		2771 7/8	(United States) Hikaru Nakamura
Münchner Pfingst-Open	(Germany) Munich	31 May – 6 June		2567 1/4	(FIDE) Alexander Motylev
Asian Continental Men Blitz Chess Championship	(Kazakhstan) Almaty	3 June	Blitz; Continental; FIDE	2573 5/8	(Kazakhstan) Arystan Isanzhulov
Asian Chess Championship	(Kazakhstan) Almaty	4–11 June	Continental; FIDE	2618	(Uzbekistan) Shamsiddin Vokhidov
Canadian Transnational Chess Championship	(Canada) Montreal	6–11 June		2587 3/4	(Latvia) Toms Kantans
Teplice Open	(Czech Republic) Teplice	10–18 June		2613 7/8	(Germany) Frederik Svane
The Las Vegas National Open	(United States) Las Vegas	14–18 June		2607 1/8	(Ukraine) Illia Nyzhnyk (Azerbaijan) Vasif Durarbayli (Cuba) Yasser Quesada (FIDE) Mikhail Antipov
Vladimir Dvorkovich Memorial – Aktobe Open Classic	(Kazakhstan) Aktobe	20–27 June		2597 1/4	(Iran) Bardiya Daneshvar
Prague Masters	(Czech Republic) Prague	20–30 June		2697 7/8	(United States) Ray Robson
Prague Challengers	(Czech Republic) Prague	20–30 June		2573 3/8	(Poland) Mateusz Bartel
World Open	(United States) Philadelphia	23 June – 4 July		2608 1/2	(United States) Fidel Corrales Jimenez
Sparkassen Chess Trophy	(Germany) Dortmund	24 June – 2 July		2649 1/8	(Germany) Alexander Donchenko
Orillas de Mar	(Spain) Adeje	25 June – 2 July		2580	(India) Abhijeet Gupta
Norwegian Chess Championship	(Norway) Oslo	30 June – 8 July	National	2557 1/4	(Norway) Simen Agdestein
Dutch Chess Championship	(Netherlands) Utrecht	2–9 July	National	2630 7/8	(Netherlands) Anish Giri
GCT SuperUnited Rapid & Blitz Croatia	(Croatia) Zagreb	3–10 July	Rapid & Blitz	2768 3/8	(Norway) Magnus Carlsen
International Open "Villa de Benasque"	(Spain) Benasque	5–14 July		2628 7/8	(China) Bu Xiangzhi
International Chess Festival Astana Zhuldyzdary	(Kazakhstan) Astana	11–18 July		2620 1/2	(India) Aditya Mittal
Geza Hetenyi Memorial	(Hungary) Budapest	11–19 July		2691 3/4	(India) R Praggnanandhaa
Biel Master Tournament	(Switzerland) Biel/Bienne	17–27 July		2603 3/4	(China) Bu Xiangzhi
Biel Grandmaster Triathlon (classical part)	(Switzerland) Biel/Bienne	18–26 July		2699 1/8	(Vietnam) Lê Quang Liêm
Romania Grand Prix Brașov	(Romania) Brașov	18–26 July		2564 5/8	(Italy) Luca Moroni
Paleochora International Chess Tournament	(Greece) Kantanos-Selino	19–26 July		2555 1/4	(China) Bai Jinshi
Uralsk Open	(Kazakhstan) Oral	21–28 July		2596 5/8	(United States) Hans Niemann
FIDE World Cup	(Azerbaijan) Baku	30 July – 24 August	FIDE	2777 1/4	(Norway) Magnus Carlsen
International Chess Cup of His Majesty the King Mohammed VI	(Morocco) Rabat	14–19 August		2643 1/8	(Lithuania) Paulius Pultinevičius
Abu Dhabi International Chess Festival	(United Arab Emirates) Abu Dhabi	16–24 August		2672 1/2	(Slovenia) Vladimir Fedoseev
French Chess Championship	(France) Alpe d'Huez	18–27 August	National	2599 1/4	(France) Yannick Gozzoli
Open Internacional de Sants-Ciutat de Barcelona	(Spain) Barcelona	18–27 August		2572 3/8	(Norway) Elham Amar
Maia Chess Open	(Portugal) Maia	25 August – 2 September		2554 3/8	(Israel) Victor Mikhalevski
Tata Steel Chess India Rapid	(India) Kolkata	5–7 September	Rapid	2729 3/4	(France) Maxime Vachier-Lagrave
Tata Steel Chess India Blitz	(India) Kolkata	8–9 September	Blitz	2729 3/4	(FIDE) Alexander Grischuk
Tsaghkadzor Open	(Armenia) Tsaghkadzor	19–28 September		2580 1/4	(India) Abhimanyu Puranik
World Junior Championship	Mexico City	21 September – 1 October	FIDE	2572 3/4	(France) Marc'Andria Maurizzi
Levitov Chess Week	(Netherlands) Amsterdam	22–26 September	Rapid	2735 5/8	(FIDE) Ian Nepomniachtchi
Asian Games Individual	(China) Hangzhou	23–27 September	Rapid	2701 1/4	(China) Wei Yi
Yerevan Open	(Armenia) Yerevan	29 September – 7 October		2555 7/8	(Armenia) Karen H. Grigoryan
Russian Championship	(Russia) St Petersburg	1–12 October	National	2650	(FIDE) Vladislav Artemiev
US Chess Championship	(United States) St. Louis	5–15 October	National	2726 3/4	(United States) Fabiano Caruana
Fagernes International Autumn	(Norway) Fagernes	8–15 October		2567 1/2	(Denmark) Mads Andersen
Spanish Championship	(Spain) Marbella	10–21 October	National	2563 1/2	(Spain) Eduardo Iturrizaga
Qatar Masters	(Qatar) Doha	11–20 October		2747 3/8	(Uzbekistan) Nodirbek Yakubboev
FIDE Grand Swiss	Douglas, Isle of Man	23 October – 5 November	FIDE	2761 5/8	(India) Vidit Gujrathi
Bavarian Open	(Germany) Gmund am Tegernsee	28 October – 5 November		2562 1/2	(Czech Republic) Jiří Štoček
Torneio Internacional da Figueira da Foz	(Portugal) Figueira da Foz	5–12 November		2562 7/8	(Cuba) Carlos Daniel Albornoz Cabrera
GCT St. Louis Rapid and Blitz	(United States) St. Louis	12–19 November	Rapid & Blitz	2751	(United States) Fabiano Caruana
Sinquefield Cup	(United States) St. Louis	21–30 November		2759 1/4	(United States) Fabiano Caruana
U.S. Masters	(United States) Charlotte	22–26 November		2594 7/8	(FIDE) Mikhail Antipov
Tournament of Peace	(Croatia) Zagreb	22–30 November		2625 3/4	(United States) Hans Niemann
El Llobregat Open	(Spain) Sant Boi de Llobregat	30 November – 8 December		2658	(India) S. L. Narayanan
London Chess Classic	(United Kingdom) London	1–10 December		2674 5/8	(England) Michael Adams
Gashimov Memorial	(Azerbaijan) Gabala	7–11 December	Rapid & Blitz	2703 7/8	(India) Vidit Gujrathi
Champions Chess Tour Finals	(Canada) Toronto	9–16 December	Rapid	2743 7/8	(Norway) Magnus Carlsen
Sunway Chess Festival	(Spain) Sitges	12–22 December		2646	(India) Abhimanyu Puranik
European Rapid Championship	(Croatia) Zagreb	14–15 December	Rapid; Continental; FIDE	2674 1/4	(Serbia) Alexey Sarana
Chennai Grand Masters	(India) Chennai	15–21 December		2711 3/8	(India) Gukesh Dommaraju
European Blitz Championship	(Croatia) Zagreb	16 December	Blitz; Continental; FIDE	2674 1/4	(Czech Republic) David Navara
World Rapid Championship	(Uzbekistan) Samarkand	26–28 December	Rapid; FIDE	2763 1/4	(Norway) Magnus Carlsen
World Blitz Championship	(Uzbekistan) Samarkand	29–30 December	Blitz; FIDE	2763 1/4	(Norway) Magnus Carlsen

== Ranking ==
"(M)" denotes the Masters section of tournaments while "(Ch)" – Challenger section.

- : Player qualified for Candidates Tournament 2024 via another path.
- : Player qualified for Candidates Tournament 2024 via this path.

Final 2023 rankings
No.	Player	Points	1	2	3	4	5
1	(United States) Fabiano Caruana (Note: Qualified for the Candidates Tournament by finishing third in the World Cup)	118.61	(Romania) GCT Romania; 1st – 26.84	(Norway) Stavanger (Main); 2nd – 21.75	(FIDE) World Cup; 3rd – 21.41	(United States) US Championship; 1st – 22.68	(United States) St Louis; 1st – 25.93
2	(India) Gukesh Dommaraju	87.36	(Germany) Düsseldorf; T 2nd-3rd – 19.26	(United Arab Emirates) Sharjah; 3rd – 13.13	(Norway) Stavanger (Main); 3rd – 19.03	(FIDE) World Cup; QF – 15.86	(India) Chennai; 1st – 20.08
3	(Netherlands) Anish Giri	84.31	(Netherlands) Tata Steel (M); 1st – 27.00	(Romania) GCT Romania; T 2nd-5th – 17.44	(Norway) Stavanger (Main); 4th – 16.31	(Netherlands) Dutch Championship; 1st – 13.09	(FIDE) Grand Swiss; 7th – 10.47
4	(United States) Wesley So	83.40	(Netherlands) Tata Steel (M); 4th – 16.20	(Germany) Düsseldorf; 4th – 14.60	(Romania) GCT Romania; T 2nd-5th – 17.44	(United States) US Championship; 2nd – 17.01	(United States) St Louis; 3rd – 18.15
5	(India) Arjun Erigaisi	81.24	(United Arab Emirates) Sharjah; 1st – 21.89	(FIDE) World Cup; QF – 15.86	(Qatar) Doha; T 3rd-8th – 11.13	(FIDE) Grand Swiss; 4th – 14.39	(India) Chennai; 2nd – 17.97
(Note: Ineligible for ranking due to minimum events criteria)	(Norway) Magnus Carlsen (Note: Qualified for the Candidates Tournament by winning the World Cup)	71.04	(Netherlands) Tata Steel (M); T 2nd-3rd – 20.25	(Norway) Stavanger (Main); 6th – 0.00	(FIDE) World Cup; 1st – 29.73	(Qatar) Doha; T 9th-22nd – 0.00	(FIDE) World Rapid; 1st – 21.06
-	(United States) Hikaru Nakamura (Note: Qualified for the Candidates Tournament by finishing second in the Grand Swiss)	59.25	(Norway) Stavanger (Main); 1st – 27.19	(FIDE) World Cup; R4 – 0.00	(Qatar) Doha; T 3rd-8th – 11.13	(FIDE) Grand Swiss; 2nd – 20.93	
6	(Iran) Amin Tabatabaei	56.14	(Netherlands) Tata Steel (Ch); 4th – 8.00	(Armenia) Jermuk; 3rd – 10.55	(United Arab Emirates) Sharjah; 7th – 8.76	(Hungary) Budapest; 2nd – 14.86	(United Kingdom) London; 2nd – 13.97
7	(India) R Praggnanandhaa (Note: Qualified for the Candidates Tournament by finishing second in the World Cup)	54.79	(Germany) Düsseldorf; T 5th-10th – 2.03	(Hungary) Budapest; 1st – 19.18	(FIDE) World Cup; 2nd – 24.18	Tata Steel India (Rapid); 3rd – 8.96	(FIDE) Grand Swiss; 13th – 0.44 (T 8th-13th)
8	(Uzbekistan) Nodirbek Abdusattorov	54.63	(Netherlands) Tata Steel (M); T 2nd-3rd – 20.25	(Germany) Düsseldorf; T 5th-10th – 2.03	(Norway) Stavanger (Blitz); 1st – 10.88	(Qatar) Doha; 2nd – 21.03	(FIDE) Grand Swiss; 12th – 0.44 (T 8th-13th)
-	(United States) Leinier Domínguez	52.47	(FIDE) World Cup; QF – 15.86	(United States) US Championship; 3rd – 15.87	(United States) St Louis; 2nd – 20.74	(Spain) Sitges; 209th (Note: Dominguez withdrew halfway through the event) – 0.00	
-	(India) Vidit Gujrathi (Note: Qualified for the Candidates Tournament by winning the Grand Swiss)	52.21	(United Arab Emirates) Sharjah; 47th – 0.00	(FIDE) World Cup; QF – 15.86	(FIDE) Grand Swiss; 1st – 26.16	(Azerbaijan) Gabala; 1st – 10.19	
-	(United States) Samuel Sevian	49.17	(United States) St. Louis (Spring); 2nd – 10.24	(Armenia) Jermuk; 1st – 15.63	(United Arab Emirates) Sharjah; 2nd – 14.23	(United States) US Championship; 5th – 9.07	(FIDE) Grand Swiss; 22nd – 0.00
9	(United States) Hans Niemann	46.85	(Spain) Menorca; 6th – 6.82	(United Arab Emirates) Sharjah; 6th – 9.85	(Kazakhstan) Uralsk; 1st – 9.66	(United States) US Championship; 6th – 7.94	(Croatia) Zagreb; 1st – 12.58
10	(Uzbekistan) Javokhir Sindarov	46.25	(Netherlands) Tata Steel (Ch); 3rd – 9.33	(United Arab Emirates) Dubai; 2nd – 14.29	(China) Hangzhou; 3rd – 8.45	(Qatar) Doha; T 3rd-8th – 11.13	(FIDE) Grand Swiss; 8th – 3.05
-	(Slovenia) Vladimir Fedoseev	44.30	(FIDE) World Cup; R3 – 0.00	(United Arab Emirates) Abu Dhabi; 1st – 16.39	(FIDE) Grand Swiss; 26th – 0.00	(Spain) Sant Boi de Llobregat; 3rd – 11.06	(FIDE) World Rapid; 2nd – 16.85
-	(United States) Levon Aronian	41.90	(Netherlands) Tata Steel (M); T 7th-8th – 4.05	(Germany) Düsseldorf; 1st – 22.30	(Kazakhstan) Satty Zhuldyz; 1st – 10.36	(United States) St Louis; 6th – 5.19 (T 4th-6th)	(India) Chennai; 5th – 0.00
11	(Germany) Vincent Keymer	40.88	(Germany) Düsseldorf; T 5th-10th – 2.03	(Kazakhstan) Satty Zhuldyz; 6th – 4.40	(Czech Republic) Prague (M); T 4th-7th – 5.44	(Switzerland) Biel/Bienne; 2nd – 15.93	(FIDE) Grand Swiss; 5th – 13.08
-	(FIDE) Ian Nepomniachtchi (Note: Qualified for the Candidates Tournament by finishing second in the 2023 World Championship)	38.59	(Germany) Düsseldorf; T 2nd-3rd – 19.26	(Romania) GCT Romania; 9th – 0.00	(FIDE) World Cup; R5 – 0.00	(Netherlands) Amsterdam; 1st – 14.14	(United States) St Louis; 4th – 5.19 (T 4th-6th)
12	(Armenia) Haik M. Martirosyan	38.44	(Armenia) Jermuk; 4th – 9.77	(United Arab Emirates) Sharjah; 5th – 10.94	(Czech Republic) Prague (M); T 4th-7th – 5.44	(Spain) Benasque; 6th – 4.19	(FIDE) European Rapid; 2nd – 8.10

== See also ==
- 2024 FIDE Circuit
