= Gukesh Dommaraju =

Indian chess grandmaster (born 2006)

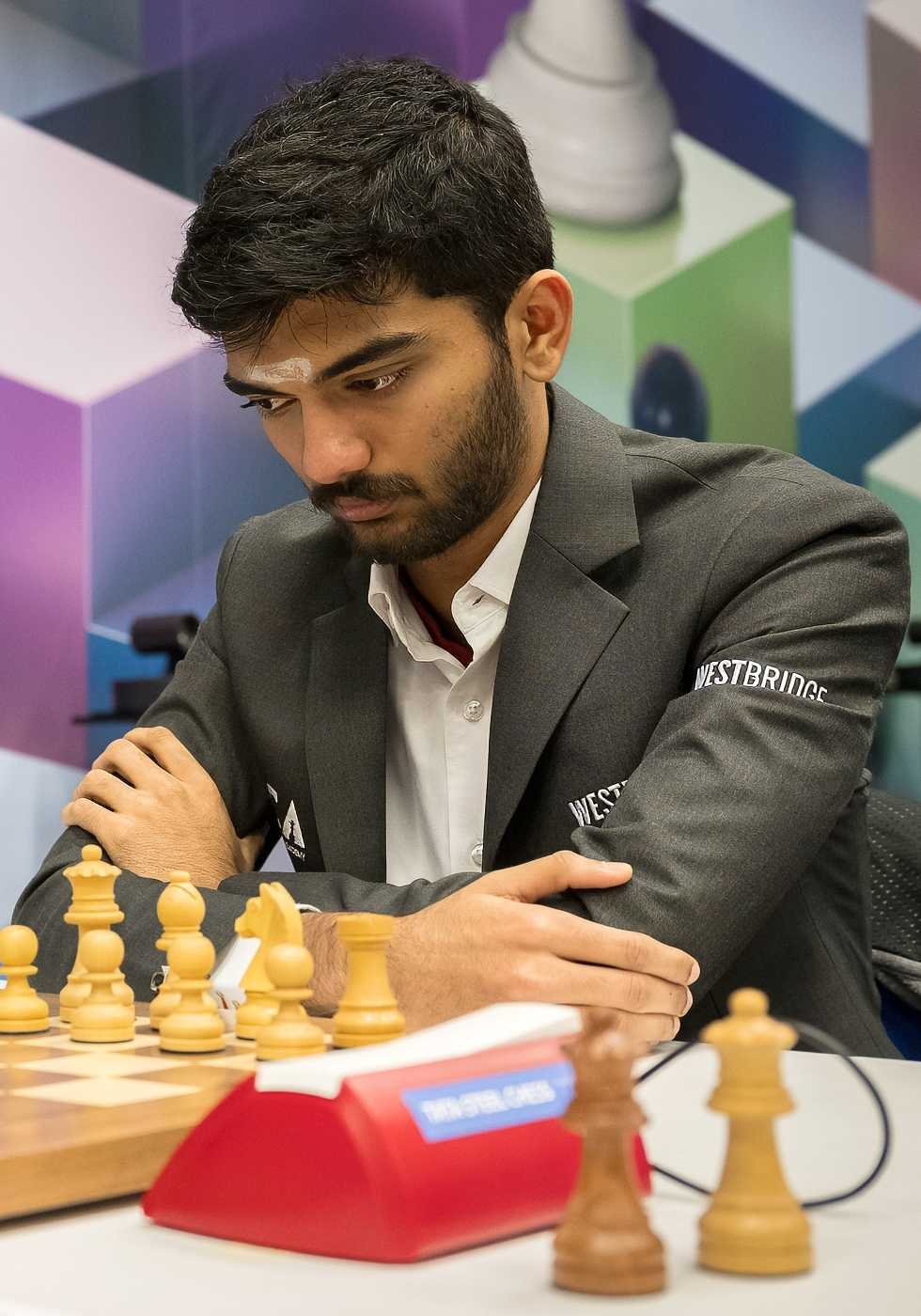
- Gukesh in 2025

Personal information
- Born: 29 May 2006 (age 20) Chennai, Tamil Nadu, India

Chess career
- Country: India
- Title: Grandmaster (2019)
- World Champion: 2024–present
- FIDE rating: 2710 (November 2026)
- Peak rating: 2794 (October 2024)
- Ranking: No. 26 (November 2026)
- Peak ranking: No. 3 (March 2025)

Gukesh Dommaraju (born 29 May 2006) is an Indian chess grandmaster and the reigning World Chess Champion. A chess prodigy, Gukesh is the youngest undisputed (Note: Ruslan Ponomariov was 91 days younger when he became the FIDE world champion in 2002, but the title was split at the time.) World Champion; the youngest player to have surpassed a FIDE rating of 2750, doing so at the age of 17; and at age 16 the third-youngest to surpass 2700 Elo. He earned the title of grandmaster at age 12 and is the fourth-youngest grandmaster in chess history.

Gukesh started playing chess at age 7. He won the under-12 title at the World Youth Chess Championship in 2018, and multiple gold medals at the 2018 Asian Youth Chess Championship. He became an International Master in March 2017, becoming a GM on 15 January 2019, at the age of 12 years, 7 months, and 17 days, making him the second-youngest grandmaster in the history of the game, after Sergey Karjakin. He was part of the Indian team that won the silver medal at the 2022 Asian Games in the men's team competition.

Gukesh won the team bronze and the individual gold medal at the 44th Chess Olympiad in 2022. In the September 2023 rating list, Gukesh ended Viswanathan Anand's consecutive 37-year record of being the top-rated Indian player. In the 45th Chess Olympiad in 2024, he won both team and individual gold medals. In 2024, he became the youngest winner of the Candidates Tournament and successfully challenged Ding Liren in the World Chess Championship, becoming the 18th and youngest undisputed world champion in history, at 18 years and 195 days. He is scheduled to defend his title against Javokhir Sindarov in 2026.

== Early life ==
=== Birth and background ===
Gukesh Dommaraju was born on 29 May 2006 in Chennai. His mother, Padmakumari, is a microbiologist, and his father, Rajinikanth, is an ENT surgeon who moved to Chennai to pursue his medical career. Gukesh studied at the Velammal Vidyalaya School in Mel Ayanambakkam, Chennai.

Gukesh's family hails from the village of Chenchuraju Kandriga, near Satyavedu in the Tirupati district of Andhra Pradesh. His father later settled in Chennai to pursue a medical career, where he married Padmakumari.

=== Chess beginnings ===
Gukesh learned to play chess at the age of seven, and eventually began structured one-hour sessions three times a week. He stopped attending school regularly after Class IV (in elementary school) to focus on his chess career. In 2017, his father quit his job to travel with Gukesh to various tournaments; Gukesh was sponsored by his parents' friends at this time, support about which he has often spoken since. His extraordinary talent was recognized institutionally early on, and he became one of the many beneficiaries of the robust Indian chess ecosystem.

Gukesh's childhood coach, GM Vishnu Prasanna, restrained him from using chess engines for analysis and training during the formative years of his career, in what has been described as a "radical experiment", with goal of developing independent analytical skills and intuition; he started using engines only after crossing the 2500 rating threshold.

== Career ==
=== 2015–2021 ===
Gukesh won the under-9 section of the Asian School Chess Championships in 2015. He won the World Youth Chess Championship in 2018 in the under-12 category. In the 2018 Asian Youth Chess Championship, he won a record five gold medals in the under-12 events in individual rapid, blitz and classical formats, and the team rapid and blitz competitions. He completed the requirements for the title of International Master in March 2017 at the 34th Cappelle-la-Grande Open.

On 15 January 2019, Gukesh became the then second-youngest grandmaster in the history of the game at the age of 12 years, 7 months, and 17 days, behind Sergey Karjakin. (Note: The record has since been beaten by Abhimanyu Mishra and Faustino Oro making Gukesh the fourth-youngest.) In June 2021, he won the Julius Baer Challengers Chess Tour, Gelfand Challenge, scoring 14 out of 19 points.

=== 2022–2023 ===
In August 2022, Gukesh won the individual gold medal on the first board in the open event at the 44th Chess Olympiad in Chennai with a score of 9 out of 11. He was part of the India-2 team which won the bronze medal in the same tournament. In September 2022, he was part of the Indian team that won the silver medal at the 2022 Asian Games in the men's team competition. In the same month, Gukesh reached a FIDE rating of over 2700 for the first time with a rating of 2726, and became the third-youngest to do so after Wei Yi and Alireza Firouzja. During the Aimchess Rapid tournament in October 2022, Gukesh became the youngest to beat Magnus Carlsen, the reigning World Chess Champion at that time.

In August 2023, Gukesh became the youngest player ever to reach a rating of 2750, breaking Carlsen's record. In the Chess World Cup 2023 at Baku, he advanced to the quarterfinals, where he lost to Carlsen. In the September 2023 rating list, Gukesh surpassed Viswanathan Anand as the top-ranked Indian player, marking the first time in 37 years that Anand was not the top-ranked Indian player.

In December 2023, Gukesh won the inaugural Chennai Grand Masters, scoring 4½/7 points and finishing level with Arjun Erigaisi before winning on tiebreak. The win contributed to his qualification for the Candidates Tournament 2024.

In December 2023, Gukesh qualified for the 2024 Candidates Tournament, to be conducted to identify the challenger to Ding Liren for the World Chess Championship. He finished 2nd in the FIDE Circuit behind Fabiano Caruana, and took the qualifying spot reserved for the winner, as Caruana had already qualified through the Chess World Cup. He was the third-youngest player to qualify for a Candidates tournament, behind Bobby Fischer and Carlsen.

=== 2024 ===
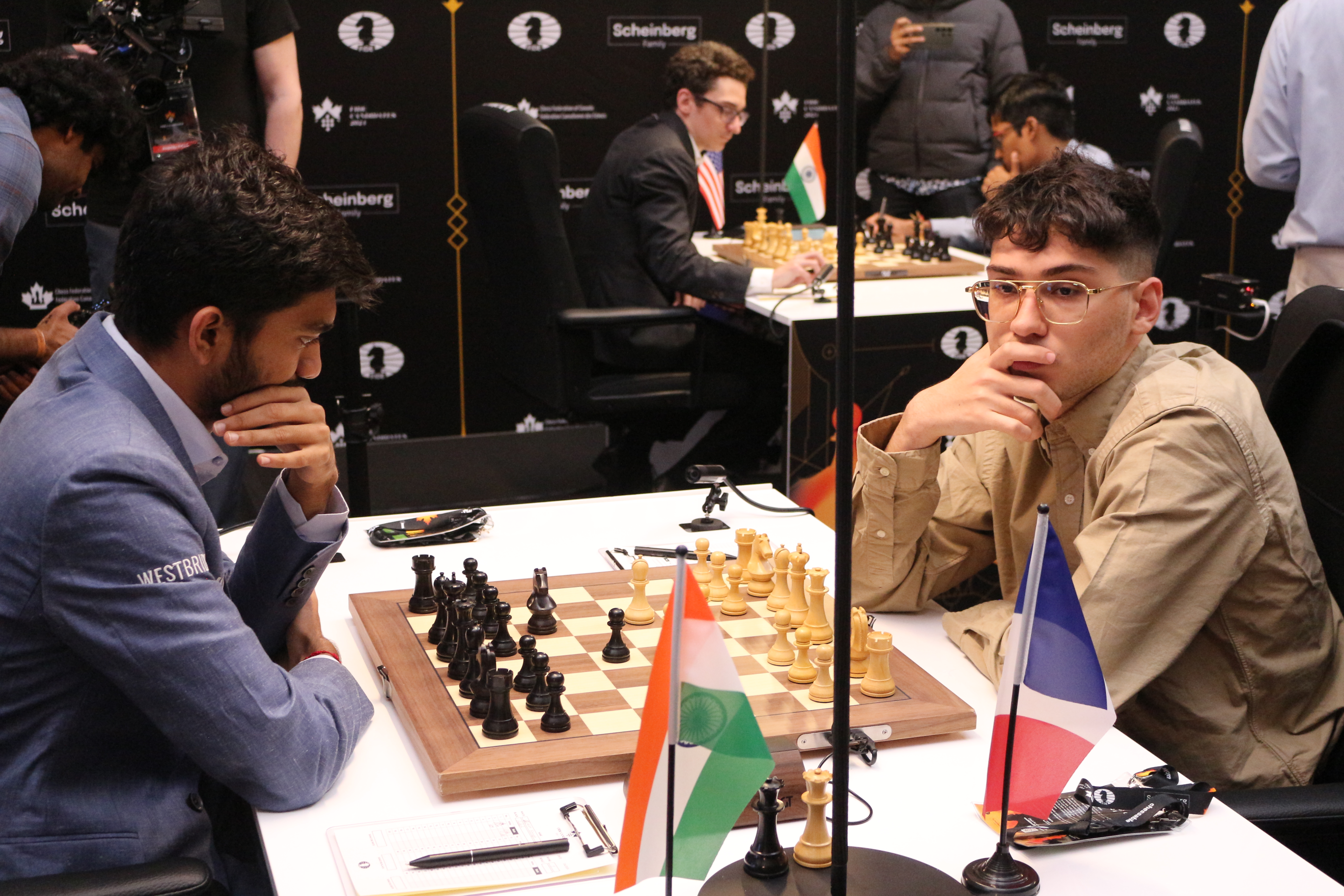
Gukesh (left) playing Alireza Firouzja at the 2024 Candidates Tournament

In January, Gukesh finished in a four-way tie for first place in the Tata Steel Chess Tournament 2024 with a score of 8½/13 rounds. He defeated Anish Giri in the semifinals before losing to Wei Yi in the finals of the tiebreaker, and finished second in the final standings.

In April, Gukesh was part of the eight-player Candidates Tournament held in Toronto. He won five games against R Praggnanandhaa and Vidit Gujrathi playing as Black, Firouzja playing as White, and Nijat Abasov playing as both Black and White. With a single loss coming against Firouzja, he finished with nine points from 14 rounds to win the tournament. He was the youngest-ever winner of the Candidates tournament.

In September, Gukesh was part of the Indian team that won gold medal in the open section of the 45th Chess Olympiad. He successfully defended his gold medal on Board 1, this time going undefeated with the score 9/10 (+8=2-0) and a performance rating of 3056. His performance helped India win its first ever gold medal at the Chess Olympiad. As a result of the win, Gukesh entered the top 5 in the FIDE rankings for the first time on 1 October 2024.

The 2024 World Chess Championship was held in November–December 2024 between Gukesh and Ding Liren. Gukesh scored three wins against two wins for Ding, and nine draws in the 14 classical rounds of the match. He won the 14th and final game on 12 December 2024, and as a result, the World Chess Championship by a scoreline of 7½–6½. The win made him the youngest undisputed World Chess Champion, breaking the record previously held by Garry Kasparov. FIDE commented on Gukesh's gameplay as having "near-perfect accuracy", and Ding reacted that it was his best tournament of the year, and that he had no regrets in losing the title to Gukesh. Gukesh's team included grandmasters Grzegorz Gajewski, Radosław Wojtaszek, Jan-Krzysztof Duda, Jan Klimkowski, Pentala Harikrishna, and Vincent Keymer, along with his mental coach Paddy Upton.

=== 2025 ===
On 17 January, Gukesh received the prestigious Major Dhyan Chand Khel Ratna Award from President Droupadi Murmu at the Rashtrapati Bhavan for his World Championship accomplishment. He was 18 years, 7 months, and 20 days old when he received the award. This made him the youngest ever recipient of the award, breaking the record previously held by Abhinav Bindra.

In January, Gukesh tied for first with R Praggnanandhaa in the Tata Steel Chess Tournament 2025 with a score of 8½ in 13 rounds. He lost 2–1 in the blitz tiebreaker.

Gukesh participated in the Freestyle Chess Grand Slam Tour, a series of Chess960 tournaments. In February, he finished in eighth place in the first leg in Weissenhaus. In April, he finished eleventh in the second leg in Paris.

In May, Gukesh participated in the second leg of the Grand Chess Tour 2025 in Romania, where he finished in a four-way tie for sixth.

In May–June, Gukesh participated in Norway Chess 2025. Gukesh lost his round 1 game to Magnus Carlsen, and his round 2 game to Arjun Erigaisi. In round 3, he scored a crucial win against Hikaru Nakamura, his first, which was Nakamura's only loss in the tournament. In round 6, Gukesh played Carlsen with the white pieces, He was in a worse position but played a series of accurate moves to equalise, Carlsen blundered in an equal position to lose in a dramatic fashion. This was Gukesh's first win against Carlsen and Carlsen's only loss in the tournament. In round 7 he defeated Erigaisi, which was Gukesh's first win against the longtime rival. Going into the last round, he was still in first place contention but lost his game against Fabiano Caruana by blundering a knight fork in an equal position. Gukesh finished the tournament in third place behind Carlsen and Caruana.

In July, Gukesh participated in the Super United Rapid and Blitz Croatia, In the Rapid section, after losing his 1st Round game to Duda, he won his next five games against Alireza, Pragg, Abdusattorov, Caruana and Carlsen, drew the next 2 games, and won in the last round against Wesley So to finish on 14/18 points, 3 points ahead of second place, Duda, In the Blitz section he only scored 5.5/18 points. His total score of 19.5/38 got him 3rd place, behind Carlsen and So.

In the Grand Swiss tournament 2025, he finished in 41st place, winning four games against Etienne Bacrot, Daniil Yuffa, Gabriel Sargissian and Andrei Volokitin, losing to Abhimanyu Mishra, Nikolas Theodorou, and Ediz Gurel, and drawing with Arjun Erigaisi, Yagiz Kaan Erdogmus, Robert Hovhannisyan and Divya Deshmukh.

In October, he helped the Superchess team win gold at 41st European Chess Club Cup, winning individual board 1 gold himself. This marked his first win since becoming world champion. He finished last in the inaugural Clutch Chess: Champions Showdown among a field of 4 players.

In November, Being the reigning World Champion, Gukesh played in the Chess World Cup as the top seed. There, he was eliminated by Frederik Svane in the third round.

In late December, Gukesh participated in both the 2025 FIDE World Rapid Championship and 2025 FIDE World Blitz Championship. He finished in 20th place during the World Rapid Championship with a score of 8.5/13. During the Open Swiss portion of the World Blitz Championship, Gukesh finished in 53rd with a score of 11/19, and did not qualify for the finals.

=== 2026 ===
Beginning in January and ending in February, Gukesh participated in the Tata Steel Chess Tournament 2026. He finished in a three-way tie for 8th place with a score of 6.5/13, but officially came in 10th after Sonneborn-Berger tiebreaks.

In March, Gukesh participated in the Masters portion of the 2026 Prague International Chess Festival. Gukesh finished in 9th place out of 10 with a score of 3.5/9(+1-3=5), avoiding last place on tiebreaks.

Gukesh withdrew from Grand Chess Tour 2026, citing recent poor performances and his upcoming World Championship match, opting to only play in GCT's Rapid & Blitz Events. Gukesh finished 6th place at Super Rapid & Blitz Poland; he defeated his World Championship Challenger Javokhir Sindarov in Rapid but lost both their Blitz games, In July he finished 6th at Super Rapid & Blitz Croatia.

In May–June, Gukesh finished last of 6 players at Norway Chess 2026, losing 5 classical games, including twice to World no.1 Magnus Carlsen, and winning only one, against eventual winner R Praggnanandhaa. In July, Gukesh finished last of 8 players at Chennai Grand Masters, (+0-3=4), losing 14 rating points to reach 2703.

In September, Gukesh participated in 46th Chess Olympiad. In contrast with the previous two Olympiads where he had played and won the individual gold medals on board 1, Gukesh played on board 4. He recovered part of his form with respectable 8½/11 points (+7=3-1), He was the highest scoring Indian player and won individual silver, his critical win against Alexander Donchenko in round 9 helped India overtake eventual bronze medalists Germany. His only loss came in the final round against Hungarian Gleb Dudin. India was unable to defend their Olympiad title and finished in 2nd place, following Uzbekistan, who defeated them in a close round 6 encounter.

== Playing style ==
Gukesh plays a reactive game and is notable for his ability to calculate under time pressure, which often leads to complex tactical battles in his games. His mentor Anand describes him as having "incredible calculating abilities". Raymond Keene writes that Gukesh's forte is his ability to keep the game alive, avoiding inferior positions while simultaneously avoiding liquidation to draws. His style has also borne comparison with former world champion Anatoly Karpov's subtle, incremental, anaconda-like gains. Carlsen regards Gukesh's style of play as "pure counter" and opined that Gukesh makes very few mistakes, which makes him "an extremely dangerous opponent under any circumstances". However, Gukesh is often dangerously optimistic about his position, causing him to take chances that he shouldn't.

== Notable games ==
- Gukesh vs Magnus Carlsen, Norway Chess (2025), Ruy Lopez: Berlin Defence, Anti Berlin Variations (C65), 1-0. Carlsen achieved a significant advantage in the middle game but with precise play from Gukesh and a number of inaccuracies from Carlsen the position transformed into a complex but equal endgame, In severe time pressure Magnus blundered a piece and Gukesh played accurately to score the most famous win of the year.
- Gukesh vs Alireza Firouzja, Candidates (2024), Ruy Lopez: Berlin Defence, Anti Berlin Variations (C65), 1–0. A crucial win in the penultimate round of the Candidates helped Gukesh take sole lead.
- Gukesh vs Wei Yi, 45th Chess Olympiad (2024), Sicilian Defence: Modern Variations (B50), 1–0. A very important win for Gukesh and team India, It received Olympiad's best game prize.

== Performance record ==
Legend
Classical international and national individual and team tournaments
Tournaments organized by FIDE (Olympiads, World Championships, World Cups, Grand Swiss and Candidates Tournaments)
Non-classical tournaments (Chess960, rapid and blitz)
Online competitions (Chess.com, Champions Chess Tour and FIDE online tournaments)

Tournament and match results (2022–present)
Year	City	Tournament	Time Control	Wins	Losses	Draws	Points	Place
2022	Kanpur	58th Indian Chess Championship	Classical	6	0	5	8½/11	2
2022	Dhaka	Bangladesh Premier League, Bangladesh Police Board 4	Classical	8	0	2	9/11	First (Team) 3rd (Board 4)
2022	Delhi	19th Delhi Open	Classical	8	1	1	8½/10	2
2022	Online	MPL Indian Chess Tour 1st Leg	Rapid	7	4	4	25/45	3
2022	Reykjavík	Reykjavik Open	Classical	4	1	4	6/9	17
2022	La Roda	48th La Roda Open	Classical	7	0	2	8/9	First
2022	Menorca	1st Menorca Open	Classical	5	0	2	6/7	First
2022	Formentera	1st Sunway Formentera Open	Classical	6	0	4	8/10	First
2022	Sharjah	5th Sharjah Masters	Classical	4	1	4	6/9	6
2022	Online	MPL Indian Chess Tour 2nd Leg	Rapid	0	2	2	2/12	Withdrew
2022	Gijón	14th Gijon City Closed	Classical	7	0	2	8/9	First
2022	Biel/Bienne	55th Biel Chess Festival	Classical Rapid Blitz Combined	3 2 5 10	2 2 4 8	2 3 5 10	15 7/14 7½/14 29½	3 4–5 5 3
2022	Chennai	44th Chess Olympiad, Open Event, India 2 Board 1	Classical	8	1	2	9/11	3rd (Team) First (Board 1)
2022	Ankara	Turkish Super League, Turkish Airlines Sports Club Board 1	Classical	5	2	3	6½/10	2nd (Team)
2022	Linares	Spanish League Honour Division, C.A. Solvay Board 2	Classical	4	1	2	5/7	First (Team)
2022	Toledo	Spanish Rapid Team Championship, SOLVAY A Board 5	Rapid	8	1	0	8/9	2nd (Team)
2022	Mayrhofen	37th European Chess Club Cup, Open section, CSU ASE Superbet Board 4	Classical	4	2	1	4½/7	6th (Team) 6th (Board 1)
2022	Online	Aimchess Rapid Prelim	Rapid	8	4	3	27/45	2–4
2022	Online	Aimchess Rapid KO Quarterfinal against Richárd Rapport	Rapid	1	2	1	1½:2½	Loss
2022	Kolkata	Tata Steel India Chess Tournament	Rapid Blitz	3 6	3 11	3 1	4½/9 6½/18	5th 10th
2022	Online	Speed Chess Championship, Round of 16 against Magnus Carlsen	Blitz	7	23	0	7:23	Loss
2022	Baku	8th Vugar Gashimov Memorial	Rapid Blitz Combined	2 7 9	4 9 13	3 2 5	7/18 8/18 15/36	7–8 7 8th
2023	Wijk aan Zee	85th Tata Steel Masters	Classical	2	4	7	5½/13	12
2023	Online	Airthings Masters Play-In	Rapid	6	0	3	7½/9	First
2023	Online	Airthings Masters Match Play against Vladimir Kramnik	Rapid	2	0	0	2:0	Win
2023	Online	Airthings Masters Division I	Rapid					5–6
2023	Düsseldorf	WR Masters	Classical Rapid TB	2 1	0 2	7 0	5½/9 1/3	2–3
2023	Online	Pro Chess League	Rapid	4	2	2	5/8	
2023	Online	Chessable Masters Play-In	Rapid	5	3	1	5½/9	24
2023	Online	Chessable Masters Match Play against Vladimir Kramnik	Rapid	0	1	1	½:1½	Loss
2023	Online	Chessable Masters Division III	Rapid					25–32
2023	Berlin	Armageddon Asia and Oceania	Blitz					First
2023	Menorca	Menorca Open	Classical Blitz TB	5 1	0 0	4 1	7/9 1½-½	First
2023	Malmö	TePe Sigeman & Co tournament	Classical	2	1	4	4/7	2–4
2023	Sharjah	6th Sharjah Masters	Classical	3	0	6	6/9	3rd
2023	Stavanger	11th Norway Chess	Blitz	2	6	1	2½/9	10
2023	Stavanger	11th Norway Chess	Classical Armageddon	2 5	1 1	6 —	14½/27	3rd
2023	Online	Junior Speed Chess Championship, Quarterfinal against Emin Ohanyan	Blitz	24	5	2	25:6	Win
2023	Online	Junior Speed Chess Championship, Semi-final against Pranav V	Blitz	15	9	3	16½:10½	Win
2023	Online	Junior Speed Chess Championship, Final against Raunak Sadhwani	Blitz	16	9	3	17½:10½	Win
2023	Dubai	Global Chess League, SG Alpine Warriors, Board 2	Rapid	1	7	2	2/10	4th (Team)
2023	Zagreb	SuperUnited Rapid & Blitz Croatia	Rapid Blitz Combined	3 9 12	2 8 10	4 1 5	10/18 9½/18 19½/36	4 6 5th
2023	Ankara	Turkish Super League, Turkish Airlines Sports Club Board 1	Classical	5	0	5	7½/10	First (Team)
2023	Baku	Chess World Cup	Classical Rapid	4 1	1 0	5 1		5–8
2023	Düsseldorf	World Rapid Team Championship, Kompetenzakademie Allstars Board 3	Rapid	8	1	3	9½/12	11th (Team) 4th (Board 1)
2023	Kolkata	Tata Steel India Chess Tournament	Rapid Blitz	2 7	2 10	5 1	4½/9 7½/18	6th 8th
2023	Online	Speed Chess Championship, Round of 16 against Maxime Vachier-Lagrave	Blitz	7	20	3	8½:21½	Loss
2023	Berlin	Armageddon Grand Finale	Blitz					5–6
2023	Hangzhou	Asian Games, Men's Team Standard, India Board 1	Classical	3	1	4	5/8	2nd (Team)
2023	Doha	Qatar Masters Open	Classical	6	2	1	6½/9	8th
2023	Douglas	Grand Swiss Tournament	Classical	2	3	6	5/11	81
2023	London	13th London Chess Classic	Classical	3	2	4	5/9	3rd
2023	Chennai	Chennai Grand Masters	Classical	2	0	5	4½/7	First
2023	Samarkand	World Rapid Championship	Rapid	6	2	5	8½/13	25
2023	Samarkand	World Blitz Championship	Blitz	12	8	1	12½/21	38
2024	Wijk aan Zee	86th Tata Steel Masters	Classical	6	2	5	8½/13	2
2024	Various	Bundesliga West, Düsseldorfer SK Board 1	Classical	3	0	0	3/3	First (Team)
2024	Wangels	Freestyle Chess G.O.A.T. Challenge	Rapid	3	4	0	3/7	6th
2024	Wangels	Freestyle Chess G.O.A.T. Challenge	Classical Rapid TB	1 1	3 0	2 1	2-4 1½-½	6th
2024	Prague	6th Prague Masters	Classical	2	2	5	4½/9	5–7
2024	Toronto	Candidates Tournament	Classical	5	1	8	9/14	First
2024	Warsaw	Superbet Rapid & Blitz Poland	Rapid Blitz Combined	2 4 6	4 11 15	3 3 6	7/18 5½/18 12½/36	8–10 10 10
2024	Bucharest	Superbet Romania Chess Classic	Classical	1	0	8	5/9	2–4
2024	Zagreb	SuperUnited Rapid & Blitz Croatia	Rapid Blitz Combined	3 3 6	3 11 14	3 4 7	9/18 5/18 14/36	7 10 7
2024	St. Louis	11th Sinquefield Cup	Classical	0	0	9	4½/9	5–7
2024	Budapest	45th Chess Olympiad, Open Event, India Board 1	Classical	8	0	2	9/10	First (Team) First (Board 1)
2024	Vrnjačka Banja	39th European Chess Club Cup, Open section, SuperChess Board 1	Classical	2	1	4	4/7	7th (Team) 9th (Board 1)
2024	Singapore	World Chess Championship match against Ding Liren	Classical	3	2	9	7½/14	Win
2025	Wijk aan Zee	87th Tata Steel Masters	Classical	5	0	5	8½/13	2
2025	Wangels	Weissenhaus Freestyle Chess Grand Slam	Rapid	0	2	7	3½/9	7–8
2025	Wangels	Weissenhaus Freestyle Chess Grand Slam	Classical Rapid TB	0 0	3 1	3 1	1½-4½ ½-1½	8th
2025	Bucharest	Superbet Chess Classic	Classical	1	2	6	4/9	9th
2025	Paris	Paris Freestyle Chess Grand Slam	Rapid	3	7	1	3½/11	11th
2025	Paris	Paris Freestyle Chess Grand Slam	Classical	0	1	1	½-1½	10–11
2025	Katowice	Gukesh vs Duda	Blitz	1	5	0	1-6	Loss
2025	Stavanger	13th Norway Chess	Classical Armageddon	4 1	4 1	2 —	14½/30	3rd
2025	Zagreb	SuperUnited Croatia Rapid & Blitz	Rapid Blitz Combined	6 4 10	1 7 8	2 7 9	14/18 5½/18 19½/36	First 10th 3rd
2025	St. Louis	Saint Louis Rapid & Blitz	Rapid Blitz Combined	4 4 8	3 6 9	2 8 10	10/18 8/18 18/36	4th 7th 7th
2025	St. Louis	12th Sinquefield Cup	Classical	1	2	6	4/9	8th
2025	Samarkand	FIDE Grand Swiss	Classical	4	3	4	6/11	41st
2025	St. Louis	Clutch Chess - Champions Showdown	Rapid (Day 1) Rapid (Day 2) Rapid (Day 3) Combined	3 0 0 3	1 3 3 7	2 3 3 8	4/6 3/12 3/18 10/36	First 4th 4th 4th
2025	Rhodes	European Club Cup	Classical	3	0	2	4/5	First (Team) First (Board 1)
2025	Goa	World Cup	Classical	1	1	2	—	Top 64 (Eliminated in 3rd round)
2025	Mumbai	Tech Mahindra Global Chess League	Rapid Third Place Matches	3 1	4 1	3 2	4½/10 2/4	3rd (Team)
2025	Doha	World Rapid Championship	Rapid	6	2	5	8½/13	20th
2025	Doha	World Blitz Championship	Blitz	10	7	2	11/19	53rd
2026	Wijk aan Zee	88th Tata Steel Masters	Classical	3	3	7	6½/13	10th
2026	Prague	8th Prague Masters	Classical	1	3	5	3½/9	9–10
2026	Menorca	Menorca Masters	Rapid	3	4	3	4½/10	4th
2026	Warsaw	Super Rapid & Blitz Poland	Rapid Blitz Combined	3 6 9	3 8 11	3 4 7	9/18 8/18 17/36	4–6 7th 6th
2026	Oslo	14th Norway Chess	Classical Armageddon	1 2	5 2	4 –	8/30	6th
2026	Zagreb	Super Rapid & Blitz Croatia	Rapid Blitz Combined	3 7 10	3 8 11	4 3 7	10/18 8½/18 18½/36	5–6 7th 6th
2026	Chennai	Chennai Grand Masters	Classical	0	3	4	2/7	8th
2026	Samarkand	46th Chess Olympiad, Open Event, India Board 4	Classical	7	1	3	8½/11	2nd (Team) 2nd (Board 4)
2026	Geneva	World Chess Championship match against Javokhir Sindarov	Classical					

World Chess Championship 2024
	Rating	Rank	Match Games														Points
	Rating	Rank	1	2	3	4	5	6	7	8	9	10	11	12	13	14	Points
Gukesh Dommaraju (IND)	2783	5	0	½	1	½	½	½	½	½	½	½	1	0	½	1	7½
Ding Liren (CHN)	2728	23	1	½	0	½	½	½	½	½	½	½	0	1	½	0	6½

World Chess Championship 2026
	Rating	Rank	Match games														Points
	Rating	Rank	1	2	3	4	5	6	7	8	9	10	11	12	13	14	Points
Javokhir Sindarov (UZB)	2782	4															
Gukesh Dommaraju (IND)	2710	26															

== Awards and nominations ==
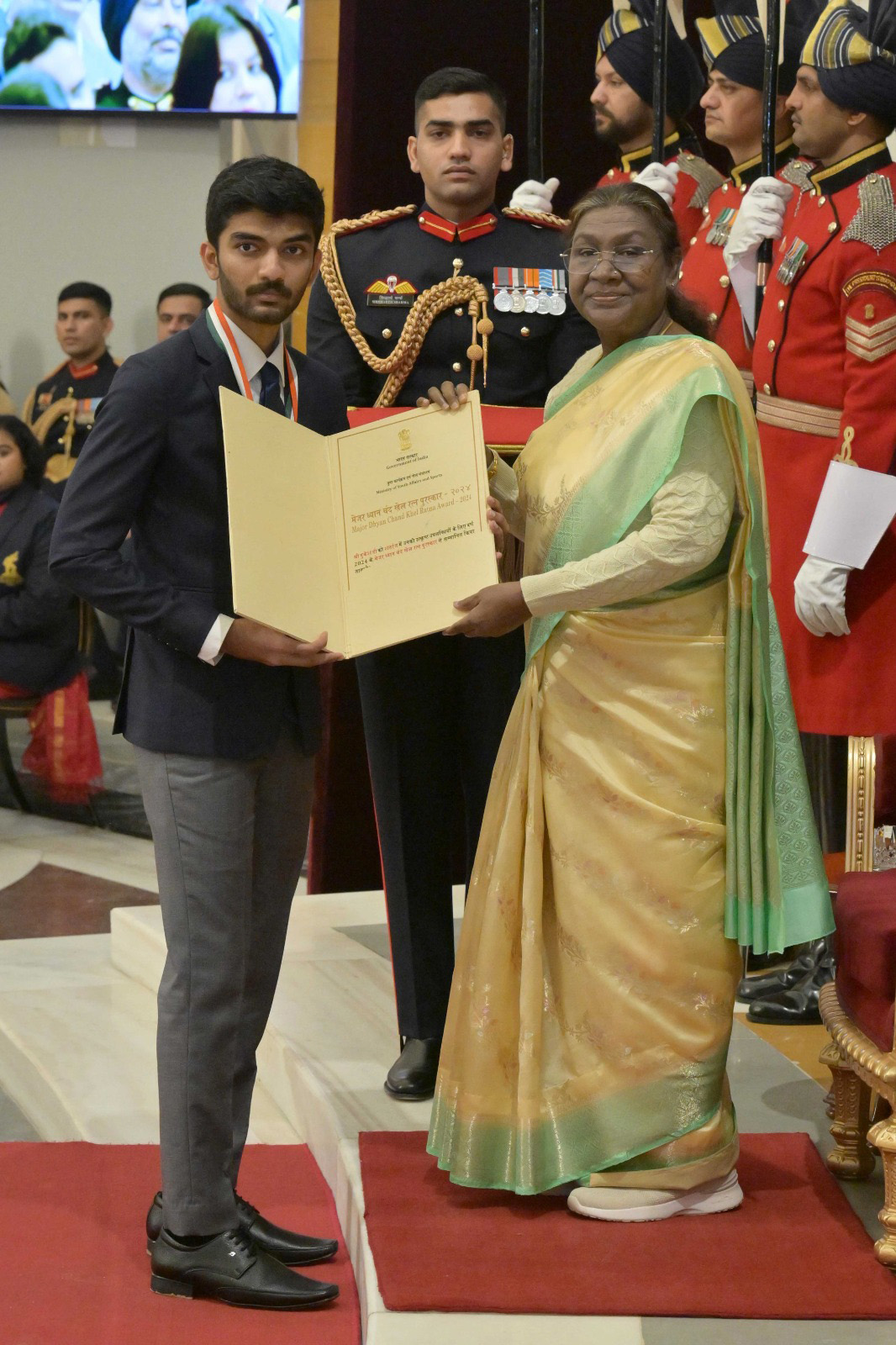
Gukesh receiving Major Dhyan Chand Khel Ratna Award from president Droupadi Murmu on 17 January 2025

Year	Award	Category	Result	Ref.
2023	Asian Chess Federation	Player of the Year	Won	
2024	Times of India Sports Awards	Chess Player of the Year	Nominated	
2025	Khel Ratna Award	Spectacular Performance in Sports	Won	
2025	Times of India Sports Awards	Sportsman of the Year	Won	
2025	Times of India Sports Awards	Chess Player of the Year Male	Won	

== See also ==
- Chess in India
- Chess prodigy

== Notes ==
Achievements
Preceded by Ding Liren	World Chess Champion; 2024–present	Incumbent
