= Platon Galperin =

Ukrainian-Swedish chess grandmaster (born 2003)

Personal information
- Born: December 10, 2003 (age 22) Kyiv, Ukraine

Chess career
- Country: Ukraine (until 2023); Sweden (since 2023)
- Title: Grandmaster (2022)
- FIDE rating: 2509 (November 2026)
- Peak rating: 2571 (September 2023)

Platon Valeryevich Galperin is a Ukrainian-Swedish chess grandmaster.

== Chess career ==
In June 2023, he won the Norway Chess Open tournament (which was part of the 2023 FIDE Circuit) with a score of 8/10.

In July 2024, he finished in 5th place at the Swedish Chess Championship.

In December 2024, he won the Yerevan Open tournament with a score of 7/9, beating Hovik Hayrapetyan on tiebreak scores.
