= Tata Steel Chess Tournament 2023 =

Chess tournament

	Masters Champion	Challengers Champion
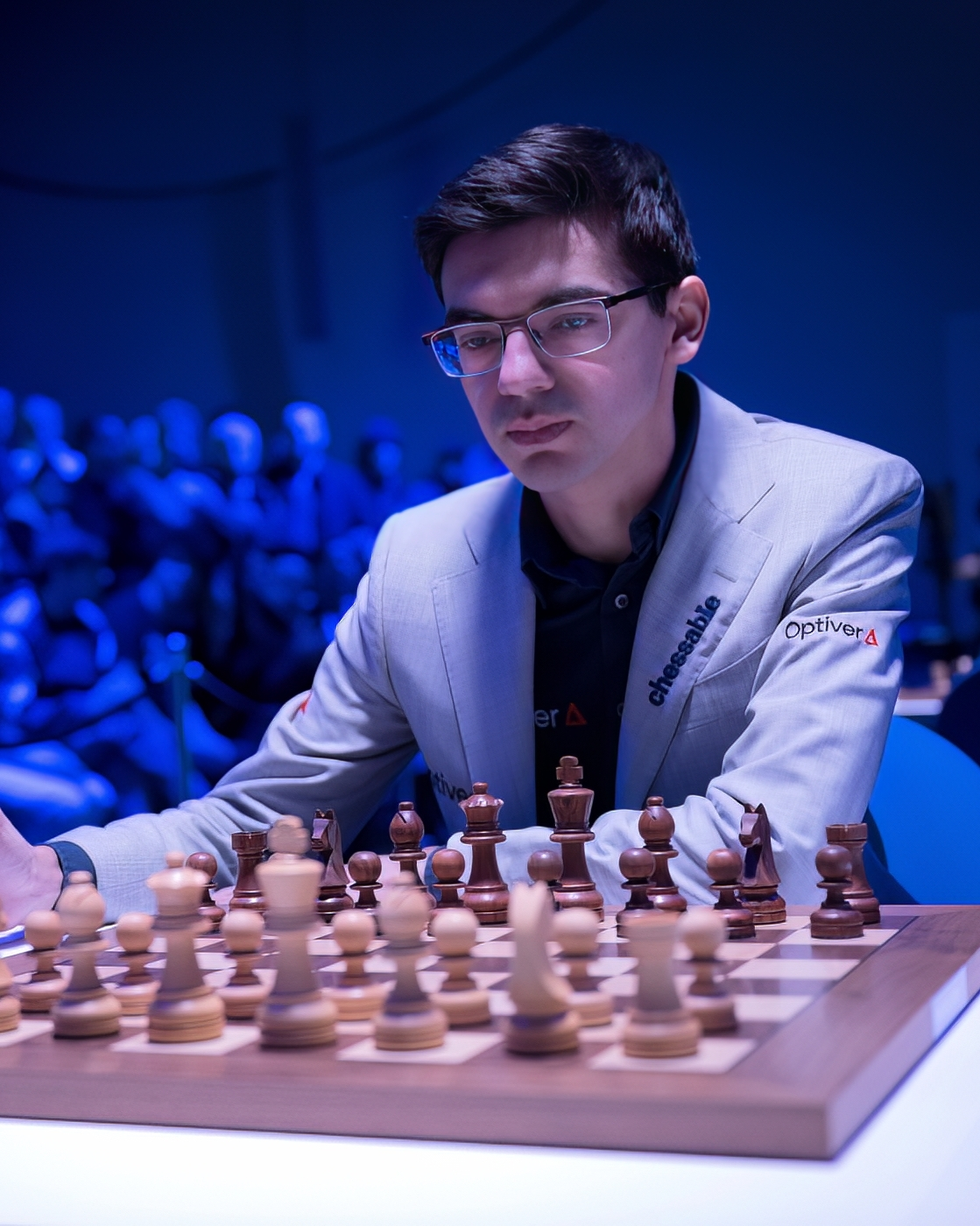
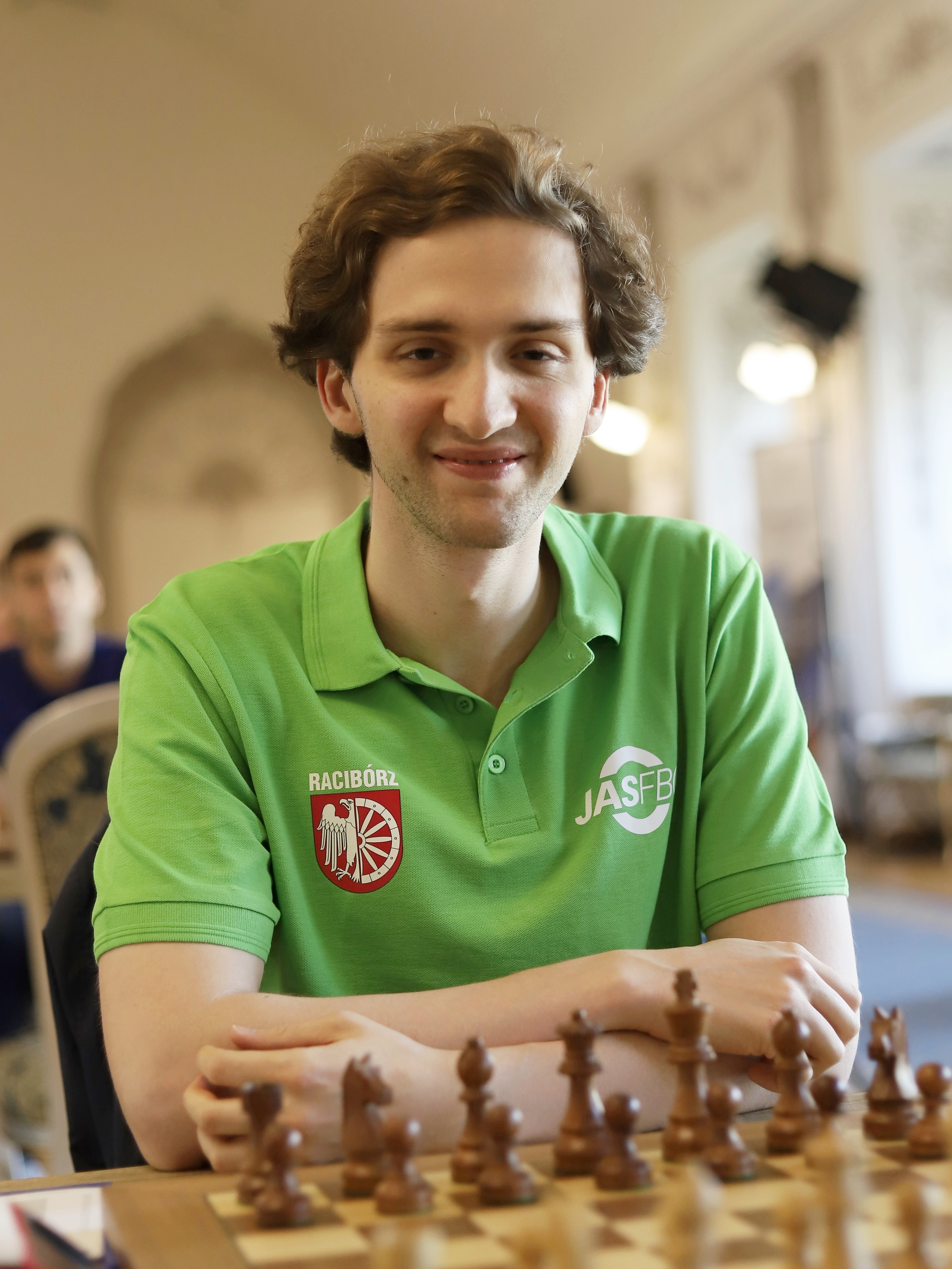
	(Netherlands) Anish Giri	(Germany) Alexander Donchenko
8½/13	Scores	10/13
	Born 28 June 1994; 28 years old	Born 22 March 1998; 24 years old

The Tata Steel Chess Tournament 2023 was the 85th edition of the annual chess tournament held in Wijk aan Zee. It was held from 13 January to 29 January 2023. The field of 14 players in the Masters section included the numbers one and two of the FIDE world rankings at the time, Magnus Carlsen and Ding Liren, as well as five teenage grandmasters. Iran’s Parham Maghsoodloo was a late substitute for Poland’s Jan-Krzysztof Duda. For the first time since 2015, Carlsen lost two classical games in a row: first in round 4 against Dutch grandmaster and five-times runner-up Anish Giri, and then in round 5 against the Uzbek teenager Nodirbek Abdusattorov. Going into the last round Abdusattorov had a half point lead over Giri, but he lost his game against Dutch 2021 winner Jorden van Foreest, while Giri defeated Richárd Rapport, making Giri the tournament's winner. Germany's Alexander Donchenko won the Challengers section, securing an invitation to the 2024 Tata Steel Masters section. Both the Masters and Challengers sections were eligible for the 2023 FIDE Circuit.

== Standings ==
85th Tata Steel Masters, 13–29 January 2023, Wijk aan Zee Netherlands, Category XX (2741)
	Player	Rating	1	2	3	4	5	6	7	8	9	10	11	12	13	14	Total	SB	H2H	TPR
1	Anish Giri (Netherlands)	2764		½	1	½	½	½	½	1	½	½	1	1	½	½	8½	54.00		2853
2	Nodirbek Abdusattorov (Uzbekistan)	2713	½		1	½	½	1	½	1	½	0	½	½	½	1	8	51.25		2827
3	Magnus Carlsen (Norway)	2859	0	0		½	1	1	½	1	½	½	½	½	1	1	8	48.00		2816
4	Wesley So (United States)	2760	½	½	½		½	½	½	½	½	½	½	1	1	½	7½	47.00		2795
5	Fabiano Caruana (United States)	2766	½	½	0	½		½	½	½	½	1	½	1	½	½	7	43.75		2767
6	Parham Maghsoodloo (Iran)	2719	½	0	0	½	½		1	½	1	1	½	0	½	1	7	42.50		2770
7	Levon Aronian (United States)	2735	½	½	½	½	½	0		½	½	½	½	½	1	½	6½	41.25		2741
8	Richárd Rapport (Romania)	2740	0	0	0	½	½	½	½		1	½	1	½	½	1	6½	37.75		2741
9	R Praggnanandhaa (India)	2684	½	½	½	½	½	0	½	0		1	1	0	½	½	6	38.75		2718
10	Jorden van Foreest (Netherlands)	2681	½	1	½	½	0	0	½	½	0		½	½	½	1	6	38.50		2718
11	Ding Liren (China)	2811	0	½	½	½	½	½	½	0	0	½		1	½	½	5½	35.00	1	2680
12	Gukesh Dommaraju (India)	2725	0	½	½	0	0	1	½	½	1	½	0		½	½	5½	35.00	0	2686
13	Vincent Keymer (Germany)	2696	½	½	0	0	½	½	0	½	½	½	½	½		½	5	32.00		2660
14	Arjun Erigaisi (India)	2722	½	0	0	½	½	0	½	0	½	0	½	½	½		4	25.75		2598

2023 Tata Steel Challengers, 13–29 January 2023, Wijk aan Zee, Netherlands, Category XIV (2587)
	Player	Rating	1	2	3	4	5	6	7	8	9	10	11	12	13	14	Total	SB	Black	TPR
1	GM Alexander Donchenko (Germany)	2627		1	½	1	½	½	1	1	0	1	½	1	1	1	10	60.75		2785
2	GM Mustafa Yılmaz (Turkey)	2609	0		1	1	½	½	1	½	1	½	½	1	½	1	9	54.50		2719
3	GM Javokhir Sindarov (Uzbekistan)	2654	½	0		½	½	½	½	½	½	1	1	1	1	1	8½	47.50		2685
4	GM Amin Tabatabaei (Iran)	2686	0	0	½		½	½	½	½	1	1	½	1	1	½	7½	42.25		2626
5	GM Adhiban Baskaran (India)	2610	½	½	½	½		1	0	½	1	½	½	½	0	1	7	45.25		2604
6	GM Luis Paulo Supi (Brazil)	2608	½	½	½	½	0		½	1	½	½	1	0	½	1	7	43.75		2605
7	GM Max Warmerdam (Netherlands)	2616	0	0	½	½	1	½		½	0	1	½	1	1	½	7	39.50		2604
8	GM Velimir Ivić (Serbia)	2585	0	½	½	½	½	0	½		½	0	1	1	1	1	7	38.25		2606
9	GM Erwin l'Ami (Netherlands)	2627	1	0	½	0	0	½	1	½		½	1	½	1	0	6½	41.50		2576
10	IM Thomas Beerdsen (Netherlands)	2515	0	½	0	0	½	½	0	1	½		1	½	½	1	6	33.50		2558
11	GM Abhimanyu Mishra (United States)	2559	½	½	0	½	½	0	½	0	0	0		½	1	1	5	28.50		2500
12	IM Vaishali Rameshbabu (India)	2425	0	0	0	0	½	1	0	0	½	½	½		1	½	4½	23.75		2481
13	GM Jerguš Pecháč (Slovakia)	2637	0	½	0	0	1	½	0	0	0	½	0	0		½	3	19.50		2366
14	IM Eline Roebers (Netherlands)	2361	0	0	0	½	0	0	½	0	1	0	0	½	½		3	17.50		2388

== Masters results by round ==
Pairings and results:

Numbers in parentheses indicate players' scores prior to the round.

Round 1 – 14 January 2023
Magnus Carlsen	Levon Aronian	½–½
Fabiano Caruana	Anish Giri	½–½
Gukesh Dommaraju	Ding Liren	0–1
Jorden van Foreest	Wesley So	½–½
Richárd Rapport	Nodirbek Abdusattorov	0–1
R Praggnanandhaa	Arjun Erigaisi	½–½
Parham Maghsoodloo	Vincent Keymer	½–½
Round 2 – 15 January 2023
Nodirbek Abdusattorov (1)	Fabiano Caruana (½)	½–½
Ding Liren (1)	Parham Maghsoodloo (½)	½–½
Vincent Keymer (½)	Magnus Carlsen (½)	0–1
Wesley So (½)	Arjun Erigaisi (½)	½–½
Levon Aronian (½)	R Praggnanandhaa (½)	½–½
Anish Giri (½)	Gukesh Dommaraju (0)	1–0
Jorden van Foreest (½)	Richárd Rapport (½)	½–½
Round 3 – 16 January 2023
Magnus Carlsen (1½)	Ding Liren (1½)	½–½
Gukesh Dommaraju (0)	Nodirbek Abdusattorov (1½)	½–½
Parham Maghsoodloo (1)	Anish Giri (1½)	½–½
Fabiano Caruana (1)	Jorden van Foreest (1)	1–0
Arjun Erigaisi (1)	Levon Aronian (1)	½–½
Richárd Rapport (½)	Wesley So (1)	½–½
R Praggnanandhaa (1)	Vincent Keymer (½)	½–½
Round 4 – 17 January 2023
Anish Giri (2)	Magnus Carlsen (2)	1–0
Ding Liren (2)	R Praggnanandhaa (1½)	0–1
Richárd Rapport (1)	Fabiano Caruana (2)	½–½
Nodirbek Abdusattorov (2)	Parham Maghsoodloo (1½)	1–0
Wesley So (1½)	Levon Aronian (1½)	½–½
Vincent Keymer (1)	Arjun Erigaisi (1½)	½–½
Jorden van Foreest (1)	Gukesh Dommaraju (½)	½–½
Round 5 – 19 January 2023
Magnus Carlsen (2)	Nodirbek Abdusattorov (3)	0–1
R Praggnanandhaa (2½)	Anish Giri (3)	½–½
Fabiano Caruana (2½)	Wesley So (2)	½–½
Arjun Erigaisi (2)	Ding Liren (2)	½–½
Levon Aronian (2)	Vincent Keymer (1½)	1–0
Parham Maghsoodloo (1½)	Jorden van Foreest (1½)	1–0
Gukesh Dommaraju (1)	Richárd Rapport (1½)	½–½
Round 6 – 20 January 2023
Wesley So (2½)	Vincent Keymer (1½)	1–0
Ding Liren (2½)	Levon Aronian (3)	½–½
Anish Giri (3½)	Arjun Erigaisi (2½)	½–½
Nodirbek Abdusattorov (4)	R Praggnanandhaa (3)	½–½
Jorden van Foreest (1½)	Magnus Carlsen (2)	½–½
Richárd Rapport (2)	Parham Maghsoodloo (2½)	½–½
Fabiano Caruana (3)	Gukesh Dommaraju (1½)	1–0
Round 7 – 21 January 2023
Arjun Erigaisi (3)	Nodirbek Abdusattorov (4½)	0–1
Levon Aronian (3½)	Anish Giri (4)	½–½
Parham Maghsoodloo (3)	Fabiano Caruana (4)	½–½
R Praggnanandhaa (3½)	Jorden van Foreest (2)	1–0
Gukesh Dommaraju (1½)	Wesley So (3½)	0–1
Magnus Carlsen (2½)	Richárd Rapport (2½)	1–0
Vincent Keymer (1½)	Ding Liren (3)	½–½

Round 8 – 22 January 2023
Nodirbek Abdusattorov (5½)	Levon Aronian (4)	½–½
Fabiano Caruana (4½)	Magnus Carlsen (3½)	0–1
Wesley So (4½)	Ding Liren (3½)	½–½
Anish Giri (4½)	Vincent Keymer (2)	½–½
Richárd Rapport (2½)	R Praggnanandhaa (4½)	1–0
Jorden van Foreest (2)	Arjun Erigaisi (3)	1–0
Gukesh Dommaraju (1½)	Parham Maghsoodloo (3½)	1–0
Round 9 – 24 January 2023
Vincent Keymer (2½)	Nodirbek Abdusattorov (6)	½–½
Ding Liren (4)	Anish Giri (5)	0–1
Parham Maghsoodloo (3½)	Wesley So (5)	½–½
Magnus Carlsen (4½)	Gukesh Dommaraju (2½)	½–½
R Praggnanandhaa (4½)	Fabiano Caruana (4½)	½–½
Levon Aronian (4½)	Jorden van Foreest (3)	½–½
Arjun Erigaisi (3)	Richárd Rapport (3½)	0–1
Round 10 – 25 January 2023
Nodirbek Abdusattorov (6½)	Ding Liren (4)	½–½
Wesley So (5½)	Anish Giri (6)	½–½
Parham Maghsoodloo (4)	Magnus Carlsen (5)	0–1
Richárd Rapport (4½)	Levon Aronian (5)	½–½
Fabiano Caruana (5)	Arjun Erigaisi (3)	½–½
Gukesh Dommaraju (3)	R Praggnanandhaa (5)	1–0
Jorden van Foreest (3½)	Vincent Keymer (3)	½–½
Round 11 – 27 January 2023
Anish Giri (6½)	Nodirbek Abdusattorov (7)	½–½
Magnus Carlsen (6)	Wesley So (6)	½–½
Levon Aronian (5½)	Fabiano Caruana (5½)	½–½
R Praggnanandhaa (5)	Parham Maghsoodloo (4)	0–1
Vincent Keymer (3½)	Richárd Rapport (5)	½–½
Ding Liren (4½)	Jorden van Foreest (4)	½–½
Arjun Erigaisi (3½)	Gukesh Dommaraju (4)	½–½
Round 12 – 28 January 2023
Wesley So (6½)	Nodirbek Abdusattorov (7½)	½–½
Jorden van Foreest (4½)	Anish Giri (7)	½–½
Magnus Carlsen (6½)	R Praggnanandhaa (5)	½–½
Fabiano Caruana (6)	Vincent Keymer (4)	½–½
Gukesh Dommaraju (4½)	Levon Aronian (6)	½–½
Richárd Rapport (5½)	Ding Liren (5)	1–0
Parham Maghsoodloo (5)	Arjun Erigaisi (4)	1–0
Round 13 – 29 January 2023
Nodirbek Abdusattorov (8)	Jorden van Foreest (5)	0–1
Anish Giri (7½)	Richárd Rapport (6½)	1–0
Arjun Erigaisi (4)	Magnus Carlsen (7)	0–1
R Praggnanandhaa (5½)	Wesley So (7)	½–½
Levon Aronian (6½)	Parham Maghsoodloo (6)	0–1
Ding Liren (5)	Fabiano Caruana (6½)	½–½
Vincent Keymer (4½)	Gukesh Dommaraju (5)	½–½
