= Grand Chess Tour 2023 =

Series of chess tournaments

2023 Grand Chess Tour
- 2023
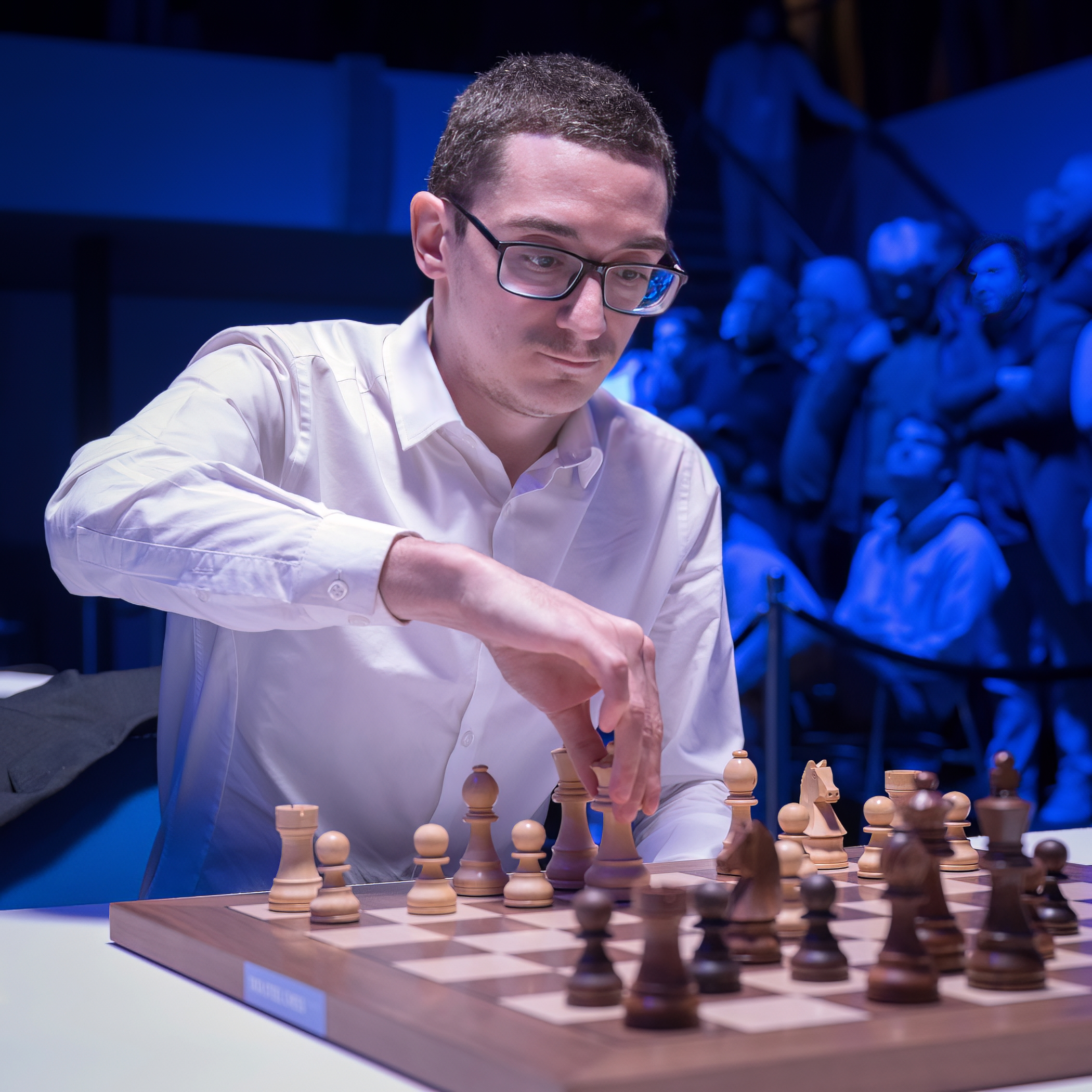
- 2023 Grand Chess Tour winner Fabiano Caruana

Tournament information
- Dates: May 4–December 3, 2023
- Host(s): Bucharest; Warsaw; Zagreb; St. Louis

Final positions
- Champion: (United States) Fabiano Caruana
- Runner-up: (France) Maxime Vachier-Lagrave
- 3rd place: (United States) Wesley So

Tournament statistics
- Most tournament titles: (United States) Fabiano Caruana (3)
- Prize money leader: (United States) Fabiano Caruana ($310,000)
- Points leader: (United States) Fabiano Caruana (46)

The Grand Chess Tour 2023 was a series of chess tournaments, which was the eighth edition of the Grand Chess Tour. It consisted of five tournaments with a total prize pool of US$1.4 million, including two tournaments with classical time control and three tournaments with faster time controls.

== Format ==
The tour consisted of five tournaments, two classicals and three rapid & blitz, respectively. Rapid & Blitz tournaments consisted of two parts – rapid (2 points for win, 1 for draw) and blitz (1 point for win, 0.5 for draw). Combined result for both portions was counted in overall standings.

The tour points were awarded as follows:

Place	Tour Points	Classical prize money	Rapid & Blitz prize money	GCT Tour bonuses
1st	12/13*	$100,000	$40,000	$100,000
2nd	10	$65,000	$30,000	$50,000
3rd	8	$48,000	$25,000	$25,000
4th	7	$32,000	$20,000	
5th	6	$26,000	$15,000	
6th	5	$21,000	$11,000	
7th	4	$18,500	$10,000	
8th	3	$16,000	$9,000	
9th	2	$13,000	$8,000	
10th	1	$10,500	$7,000	

- If a player wins 1st place outright (without the need for a playoff), they are awarded 13 points instead of 12.
- Tour points and prize money are shared equally between tied players.

== Lineup ==
The field was announced on February 22, 2023. It consisted of nine players, including both participants of World Chess Championship 2023, eventual winner Ding Liren and runner-up Ian Nepomniachtchi, as well as defending Grand Chess Tour champion Alireza Firouzja.

Player	Country	FIDE rating (February 2023)
Alireza Firouzja	France	2785
Wesley So	United States	2766
Maxime Vachier-Lagrave	France	2737
Ian Nepomniachtchi	FIDE (Note: Nepomniachtchi is Russian, but plays under the FIDE flag due to FIDE banning Russian and Belarusian flags from FIDE-rated events in response to the Russian invasion of Ukraine.)	2793
Ding Liren	China	2788
Anish Giri	Netherlands	2780
Fabiano Caruana	United States	2766
Jan-Krzysztof Duda	Poland	2729
Richárd Rapport	Romania	2740

== Schedule ==
The events in St. Louis took place during the months of November and December, compared to the previous editions where they took place during the months of August and September. The change was implemented to avoid scheduling clashes with the 2023 Chess World Cup and the 2023 FIDE Grand Swiss Tournament.

Dates	Tournament Name	Format	Host city
May 4–16, 2023	Superbet Chess Classic	Classical	Bucharest
May 19–26, 2023	Superbet Rapid & Blitz	Rapid & Blitz	Warsaw
July 3–10, 2023	SuperUnited Rapid & Blitz	Rapid & Blitz	Zagreb
November 12–19, 2023	Saint Louis Rapid & Blitz	Rapid & Blitz	St. Louis
November 21–30, 2023	Sinquefield Cup	Classical	St. Louis

== Results ==
=== Tournament results ===
Dates	Tournament Name	Winner	Runner-up	Third place
May 4–16, 2023	Superbet Chess Classic	Fabiano Caruana	Wesley So; Richárd Rapport; Anish Giri; Alireza Firouzja	–
May 19–26, 2023	Poland Rapid & Blitz	Magnus Carlsen (WC)	Jan-Krzysztof Duda	Maxime Vachier-Lagrave; Wesley So
July 3–10, 2023	Croatia Rapid & Blitz	Magnus Carlsen (WC)	Ian Nepomniachtchi	Alireza Firouzja
November 12–19, 2023	Saint Louis Rapid & Blitz	Fabiano Caruana	Maxime Vachier-Lagrave	Ian Nepomniachtchi; Lê Quang Liêm (WC)
November 21–30, 2023	Sinquefield Cup	Fabiano Caruana	Leinier Domínguez (WC)	Wesley So

=== Tour rankings ===
The wildcards (in italics) are not counted in overall standings.

	Player	ROU	POL	CRO	STL	SIN	Total points	Prize money
1	Fabiano Caruana (United States)	13	—N/a	7	13	13	46	$310,000
2	Maxime Vachier-Lagrave (France)	4.5	7.5	—N/a	10	6	28	$148,583
3	Wesley So (United States)	7.75	7.5	—N/a	4.5	8	27.75	$148,750
4	Ian Nepomniachtchi (FIDE)	2	—N/a	10	7.5	6	25.5	$91,833
5	Alireza Firouzja (France)	7.75	—N/a	8	6	3	24.75	$98,750
6	Richárd Rapport (Romania)	7.75	5	5	—N/a	2	19.75	$77,750
7	Jan-Krzysztof Duda (Poland)	4.5	10	3.5	—N/a	1 (Note: Withdrew after first round)	19	$59,250
8	Anish Giri (Netherlands)	7.75	4	—N/a	2	4	17.75	$79,250
9	Ding Liren (China) (Note: Ding withdrew before the Poland Rapid and Blitz event took place, citing fatigue. As a result of this change, Levon Aronian was chosen as a wildcard to replace him for the event.)	3	—N/a	—N/a	—N/a	—N/a	3	$16,000
	Magnus Carlsen (Norway)	—N/a	13	13	—N/a	—N/a	26	$80,000
	Levon Aronian (United States)	—N/a	6	—N/a	—N/a	6	12	$41,333
	Leinier Domínguez (United States)	—N/a	—N/a	—N/a	—N/a	10	10	$65,000
	Lê Quang Liêm (Vietnam)	—N/a	—N/a	—N/a	7.5	—N/a	7.5	$22,500
	Gukesh D (India)	—N/a	—N/a	6	—N/a	—N/a	6	$15,000
	Ray Robson (United States)	—N/a	—N/a	—N/a	4.5	—N/a	4.5	$10,500
	Viswanathan Anand (India)	—N/a	—N/a	3.5	—N/a	—N/a	3.5	$9,500
	Bogdan-Daniel Deac (Romania)	1	2	—N/a	—N/a	—N/a	3	$18,000
	Kirill Shevchenko (Romania)	—N/a	3	—N/a	—N/a	—N/a	3	$9,000
	Samuel Sevian (United States)	—N/a	—N/a	—N/a	3	—N/a	3	$9,000
	Ivan Šarić (Croatia)	—N/a	—N/a	2	—N/a	—N/a	2	$8,000
	Radosław Wojtaszek (Poland)	—N/a	1	—N/a	—N/a	—N/a	1	$7,000
	Constantin Lupulescu (Romania)	—N/a	—N/a	1	—N/a	—N/a	1	$7,000
	Jeffery Xiong (United States)	—N/a	—N/a	—N/a	1	—N/a	1	$7,000

== Tournaments ==
=== Superbet Chess Classic ===
The first leg of the Grand Chess Tour was held in Bucharest, Romania from May 4–16, 2023. The winner of the tournament was Fabiano Caruana.

2023 GCT Superbet Chess Classic, May 4–16 Bucharest, Romania, Category XXI (2757.1)
	Player	Rating	1	2	3	4	5	6	7	8	9	10	Points	TB	Tour Points	Prize money	Circuit
1	Fabiano Caruana (USA)	2764		½	½	½	½	½	1	½	1	½	5½		13	$100,000	26.84
2	Wesley So (USA)	2760	½		½	½	1	½	½	½	½	½	5		7.75	$42,750	17.44
3	Richárd Rapport (ROU)	2745	½	½		½	½	1	½	½	½	½	5		7.75	$42,750	17.44
4	Anish Giri (NED)	2768	½	½	½		½	½	½	1	½	½	5		7.75	$42,750	17.44
5	Alireza Firouzja (FRA)	2785	½	0	½	½		0	½	1	1	1	5		7.75	$42,750	17.44
6	Jan-Krzysztof Duda (POL)	2724	½	½	0	½	1		½	½	½	½	4½		4.5	$19,750	
7	Maxime Vachier-Lagrave (FRA)	2742	0	½	½	½	½	½		½	1	½	4½		4.5	$19,750	
8	Ding Liren (CHN)	2789	½	½	½	0	0	½	½		½	1	4		3	$16,000	
9	Ian Nepomniachtchi (FIDE)	2794	0	½	½	½	0	½	0	½		1	3½		2	$13,000	
10	Bogdan-Daniel Deac (ROU)	2700	½	½	½	½	0	½	½	0	0		3		WC (1)	$10,500	

=== Superbet Rapid and Blitz Poland ===
The second leg of the Grand Chess Tour was held in Warsaw, Poland from May 19 to 26, 2023. Jan-Krzysztof Duda was the winner of the rapid portion, while Magnus Carlsen won the blitz portion, and won the overall tournament.

2023 GCT Superbet Rapid & Blitz Poland, May 19–26 Warsaw, Poland
	Player	Rapid	Blitz	Total	TB	Tour Points	Prize money	Circuit
1	Magnus Carlsen (NOR)	10	14	24		WC (13)	$40,000	12.73
2	Jan-Krzysztof Duda (POL)	13	10	23		10	$30,000	10.19
T-3	Maxime Vachier-Lagrave (FRA)	11	10½	21½		7.5	$22,500	8.28
T-3	Wesley So (USA)	11	10½	21½		7.5	$22,500	8.28
5	Levon Aronian (USA)	12	8½	20½		WC (6)	$15,000	6.37
6	Richard Rapport (ROU)	9	9	18		5	$11,000	
7	Anish Giri (NED)	7	8	15		4	$10,000	
8	Kirill Shevchenko (ROU)	4	9	13		WC (3)	$9,000	
9	Bogdan-Daniel Deac (ROU)	6	6½	12½		WC (2)	$8,000	
10	Radosław Wojtaszek (POL)	7	4	11		WC (1)	$7,000	

2023 GCT Superbet Rapid & Blitz Poland – Rapid, May 21–23 Warsaw, Poland
	Player	Rating	1	2	3	4	5	6	7	8	9	10	Points
1	Jan-Krzysztof Duda (POL)	2782		1	1	2	1	1	2	2	2	1	13
2	Levon Aronian (USA)	2729	1		1	1	1	1	2	2	1	2	12
3	Wesley So (USA)	2788	1	1		0	1	2	1	1	2	2	11
4	Maxime Vachier-Lagrave (FRA)	2762	0	1	2		1	1	1	1	2	2	11
5	Magnus Carlsen (NOR)	2839	1	1	1	1		1	1	0	2	2	10
6	Richárd Rapport (ROU)	2767	1	1	0	1	1		1	1	1	2	9
7	Anish Giri (NED)	2714	0	0	1	1	1	1		2	0	1	7
8	Radosław Wojtaszek (POL)	2622	0	0	1	1	2	1	0		1	1	7
9	Bogdan-Daniel Deac (ROU)	2618	0	1	0	0	0	1	2	1		1	6
10	Kirill Shevchenko (ROU)	2602	1	0	0	0	0	0	1	1	1		4

2023 GCT Superbet Rapid & Blitz Poland – Blitz, May 24–25 Warsaw, Poland
	Player	Rating	1	2	3	4	5	6	7	8	9	10	Points
1	Magnus Carlsen (NOR)	2852		1 1	0 1	1 ½	1 1	1 1	1 ½	1 ½	½ ½	½ 1	14
2	Maxime Vachier-Lagrave (FRA)	2723	0 0		½ ½	0 1	½ 0	1 1	½ 1	1 1	0 ½	1 1	10½
3	Wesley So (USA)	2749	1 0	½ ½		½ 0	½ 1	½ ½	1 ½	0 1	1 ½	½ 1	10½
4	Jan-Krzysztof Duda (POL)	2790	0 ½	1 0	½ 1		½ 1	0 1	0 0	½ 0	1 1	1 1	10
5	Kirill Shevchenko (ROU)	2562	0 0	½ 1	½ 0	½ 0		1 0	0 1	1 ½	1 0	1 1	9
6	Richard Rapport (ROU)	2701	0 0	0 0	½ ½	1 0	0 1		1 ½	1 ½	0 1	1 1	9
7	Levon Aronian (USA)	2804	0 ½	½ 0	0 ½	1 1	1 0	0 ½		0 ½	1 1	½ ½	8½
8	Anish Giri (NED)	2807	0 ½	0 0	1 0	½ 1	0 ½	0 ½	1 ½		0 1	1 ½	8
9	Bogdan-Daniel Deac (ROU)	2649	½ ½	1 ½	0 ½	0 0	0 1	1 0	0 0	1 0		0 ½	6½
10	Radosław Wojtaszek (POL)	2605	½ 0	0 0	½ 0	0 0	0 0	0 0	½ ½	0 ½	1 ½		4

=== SuperUnited Rapid and Blitz Croatia ===
The third leg of the Grand Chess Tour was held in Zagreb, Croatia from July 5 to 9, 2023. Ian Nepomniachtchi and Fabiano Caruana were the joint winners of the rapid portion, while Magnus Carlsen won the blitz portion, and won the overall tournament.

2023 GCT SuperUnited Rapid & Blitz Croatia, July 3–10 Zagreb, Croatia
	Player	Rapid	Blitz	Total	TB	Tour Points	Prize money	Circuit
1	Magnus Carlsen (NOR)	11	15	26		WC (13)	$40,000	13.47
2	Ian Nepomniachtchi (FIDE)	12	10½	22½		10	$30,000	10.78
3	Alireza Firouzja (FRA)	9	13	22		8	$25,000	9.43
4	Fabiano Caruana (USA)	12	9½	21½		7	$20,000	8.08
5	Gukesh D (IND)	10	9½	19½		WC (6)	$15,000	6.73
6	Richárd Rapport (ROU)	9	10	19		5	$11,000	
T-7	Jan-Krzysztof Duda (POL)	9	7½	16½		3.5	$9,500	
T-7	Viswanathan Anand (IND)	10	6½	16½		WC (3.5)	$9,500	
9	Ivan Šarić (CRO)	6	6	12		WC (2)	$8,000	
10	Constantin Lupulescu (ROU)	2	2½	4½		WC (1)	$7,000	

2023 GCT SuperUnited Rapid & Blitz Croatia – Rapid, July 5–7 Zagreb, Croatia
	Player	Rating	1	2	3	4	5	6	7	8	9	10	Points
1	Ian Nepomniachtchi (FIDE)	2760		1	1	1	1	2	2	0	2	2	12
2	Fabiano Caruana (USA)	2752	1		2	2	1	1	0	2	1	2	12
3	Magnus Carlsen (NOR)	2829	1	0		2	2	0	1	2	1	2	11
4	Gukesh D (IND)	2629	1	0	0		2	1	1	1	2	2	10
5	Viswanathan Anand (IND)	2731	1	1	0	0		1	2	1	2	2	10
6	Alireza Firouzja (FRA)	2745	0	1	2	1	1		1	0	2	1	9
7	Richárd Rapport (ROU)	2761	0	2	1	1	0	1		2	0	2	9
8	Jan-Krzysztof Duda (POL)	2794	2	0	0	1	1	2	0		1	2	9
9	Ivan Saric (CRO)	2635	0	1	1	0	0	0	2	1		1	6
10	Constantin Lupulescu (ROU)	2572	0	0	0	0	0	1	0	0	1		2

2023 GCT SuperUnited Rapid & Blitz Croatia – Blitz, July 8–9 Zagreb, Croatia
	Player	Rating	1	2	3	4	5	6	7	8	9	10	Points
1	Magnus Carlsen (NOR)	2858		1 0	1 1	1 0	1 ½	1 1	1 ½	1 1	1 1	1 1	15
2	Alireza Firouzja (FRA)	2896	0 1		1 0	0 ½	1 0	1 1	½ 1	1 1	1 1	1 1	13
3	Ian Nepomniachtchi (FIDE)	2781	0 0	0 1		½ ½	½ ½	1 ½	1 1	½ 0	½ 1	1 1	10½
4	Richárd Rapport (ROU)	2707	0 1	1 ½	½ ½		0 1	0 0	1 0	1 ½	0 1	1 1	10
5	Fabiano Caruana (USA)	2832	0 ½	0 1	½ ½	1 0		1 0	½ 0	0 1	1 ½	1 1	9½
6	Gukesh D (IND)	2626	0 0	0 0	0 ½	1 1	0 1		1 1	0 1	0 1	1 1	9½
7	Jan-Krzysztof Duda (POL)	2783	0 ½	½ 0	0 0	0 1	½ 1	0 0		1 0	1 ½	½ 1	7½
8	Viswanathan Anand (IND)	2733	0 0	0 0	½ 1	0 ½	1 0	1 0	0 1		0 ½	½ ½	6½
9	Ivan Saric (CRO)	2576	0 0	0 0	½ 0	1 0	0 ½	1 0	0 ½	1 ½		½ ½	6
10	Constantin Lupulescu (ROU)	2576	0 0	0 0	0 0	0 0	0 0	0 0	½ 0	½ ½	½ ½		2½

=== Saint Louis Rapid and Blitz ===
The fourth leg of the Grand Chess Tour was held in Saint Louis, Missouri, United States from November 12 to 19, 2023.

2023 GCT Saint Louis Rapid & Blitz, November 12–19 Saint Louis, Missouri, United States
	Player	Rapid	Blitz	Total	TB	Tour Points	Prize money	Circuit
1	Fabiano Caruana (USA)	10	11	21		13	$40,000	12.55
2	Maxime Vachier-Lagrave (FRA)	10	10½	20½		10	$30,000	10.04
T-3	Ian Nepomniachtchi (FIDE)	9	11	20		7.5	$22,500	8.16
T-3	Lê Quang Liêm (VIE)	9	11	20		WC (7.5)	$22,500	8.16
5	Alireza Firouzja (FRA)	9	9½	18½		6	$15,000	6.28
T-6	Wesley So (USA)	7	10	17		4.5	$10,500	
T-6	Ray Robson (USA)	11	6	17		WC (4.5)	$10,500	
8	Samuel Sevian (USA)	9	7½	16½		WC (3)	$9,000	
9	Anish Giri (NED)	9	7	16		2	$8,000	
10	Jeffery Xiong (USA)	7	6½	13½		WC (1)	$7,000	

2023 GCT Saint Louis Rapid & Blitz – Rapid, November 14–16 Saint Louis, Missouri, United States
	Player	Rating	1	2	3	4	5	6	7	8	9	10	Points
1	Ray Robson (USA)	2596		1	1	2	2	1	1	2	0	1	11
2	Maxime Vachier-Lagrave (FRA)	2771	1		1	1	1	1	1	1	2	1	10
3	Fabiano Caruana (USA)	2765	1	1		1	0	1	2	1	1	2	10
4	Ian Nepomniachtchi (FIDE)	2789	0	1	1		1	1	2	0	2	1	9
5	Alireza Firouzja (FRA)	2742	0	1	2	1		2	1	0	1	1	9
6	Anish Giri (NED)	2697	1	1	1	1	0		1	2	1	1	9
7	Lê Quang Liêm (VIE)	2652	1	1	0	0	1	1		1	2	2	9
8	Samuel Sevian (USA)	2581	0	1	1	2	2	0	1		1	1	9
9	Wesley So (USA)	2753	2	0	1	0	1	1	0	1		1	7
10	Jeffery Xiong (USA)	2727	1	1	0	1	1	1	0	1	1		7

2023 GCT Saint Louis Rapid & Blitz – Blitz, November 17–18 Saint Louis, Missouri, United States
	Player	Rating	1	2	3	4	5	6	7	8	9	10	Points
T-1	Lê Quang Liêm (VIE)	2665		1 1	0 ½	0 1	0 ½	1 1	1 0	1 ½	0 1	½ 1	11
T-1	Fabiano Caruana (USA)	2813	0 0		0 1	½ ½	1 1	1 1	0 ½	1 1	1 1	½ 0	11
T-1	Ian Nepomniachtchi (FIDE)	2785	1 ½	1 0		1 1	0 ½	0 0	1 ½	0 ½	1 1	1 1	11
4	Maxime Vachier-Lagrave (FRA)	2728	1 0	½ ½	0 0		1 0	1 1	1 ½	1 ½	½ ½	1 ½	10½
5	Wesley So (USA)	2760	1 ½	0 0	1 ½	0 1		½ ½	½ ½	1 0	1 ½	1 ½	10
6	Alireza Firouzja (FRA)	2896	0 0	0 0	1 1	0 0	½ ½		1 ½	1 1	1 0	1 1	9½
7	Samuel Sevian (USA)	2695	0 1	1 ½	0 ½	0 ½	½ ½	0 ½		0 1	½ 1	0 0	7½
8	Anish Giri (NED)	2752	0 ½	0 0	1 ½	0 ½	0 1	0 0	1 0		½ ½	1 ½	7
9	Jeffery Xiong (USA)	2726	1 0	0 0	0 0	½ ½	0 ½	0 1	½ 0	½ ½		½ 1	6½
10	Ray Robson (USA)	2665	½ 0	½ 1	0 0	0 ½	0 ½	0 0	1 1	0 ½	½ 0		6

=== Sinquefield Cup ===
2023 GCT Sinquefield Cup, November 21–30, Saint Louis, Missouri, United States, Category XXI (2753.2)
	Player	Rating	1	2	3	4	5	6	7	8	9	10	Points	TB	Tour Points	Prize money	Circuit
1	Fabiano Caruana (USA)	2795		½	1	½	½	½	½	1	1	–	5½		13	$100,000	25.93
2	Leinier Domínguez (USA)	2745	½		½	½	½	½	1	½	1	–	5		WC (10)	$65,000	20.74
3	Wesley So (USA)	2752	0	½		½	½	1	½	½	1	–	4½		8	$48,000	18.15
4	Maxime Vachier-Lagrave (FRA)	2734	½	½	½		½	½	½	½	½	–	4		6	$26,333	5.19
5	Ian Nepomniachtchi (FIDE)	2771	½	½	½	½		½	½	½	½	–	4		6	$26,333	5.19
6	Levon Aronian (USA)	2727	½	½	0	½	½		½	1	½	–	4		WC (6)	$26,333	5.19
7	Anish Giri (NED)	2752	½	0	½	½	½	½		½	½	~~½~~	3½		4	$18,500	
8	Alireza Firouzja (FRA)	2777	0	½	½	½	½	0	½		½	–	3		3	$13,000	
9	Richárd Rapport (ROU)	2748	0	0	0	½	½	½	½	½		–	2½		2	$13,000	
10	Jan-Krzysztof Duda (POL) (Note: Jan-Krzysztof Duda withdrew from the Sinquefield Cup after round 1 due to illness; his round 1 result was not counted towards the standings.)	2731	–	–	–	–	–	–	~~½~~	–	–		–		–	–	
