= Yuri Solodovnichenko =

Ukrainian chess grandmaster (born 1978)

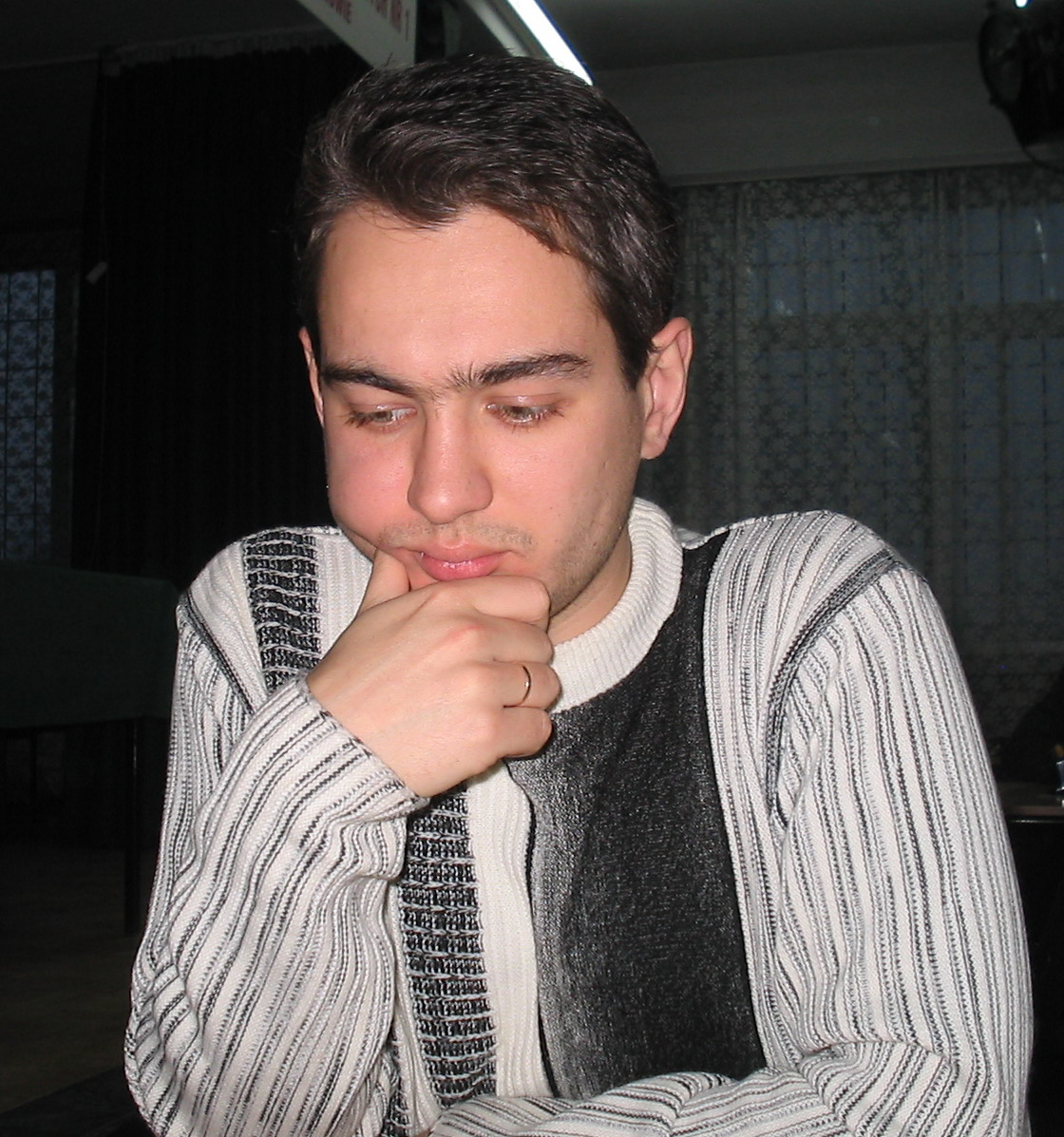

Personal information
- Born: February 8, 1978 (age 48) Kherson, Ukrainian SSR, Soviet Union

Chess career
- Country: Ukraine
- Title: Grandmaster (2007)
- FIDE rating: 2500 (November 2026)
- Peak rating: 2629 (November 2011)

Yuri Vladyslavovich Solodovnichenko is a Ukrainian chess grandmaster.

== Chess career ==
In August 2021, he tied for first with Nikolas Theodorou, Szymon Gumularz, and Hristos Banikas at the Paleochora Open. He won the tournament on tiebreak scores.

In September 2021, he won the Imperia International Chess Festival Open A tournament, scoring 6.5/9 and beating Pierre Laurent-Paoli on tiebreak scores.

In July 2024, he won the Barbera del Valles Open A with a score of 7.5/9, half a point ahead of runners-up Michel Alejandro Diaz Perez and Kaustuv Kundu.

In July 2025, he won the La Plagne Masters with an unbeaten score of 7.5/9.
