= Richárd Rapport =

Hungarian chess grandmaster (born 1996)

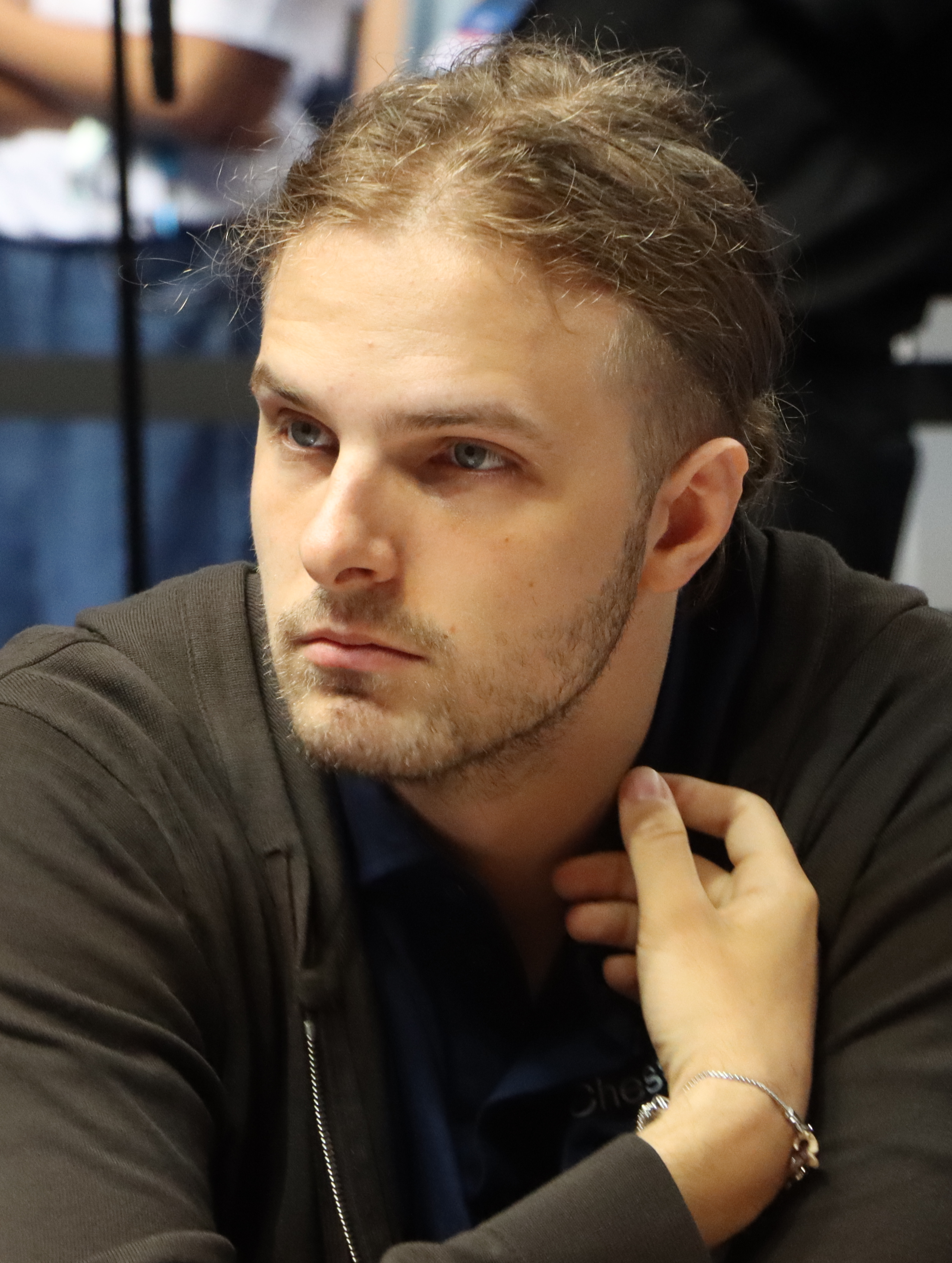
- Rapport in 2026

Personal information
- Born: 25 March 1996 (age 30) Szombathely, Hungary
- Spouse: Jovana Vojinović (m. 2016)

Chess career
- Country: Hungary (until 2022; since 2024); Romania (2022–2024)
- Title: Grandmaster (2010)
- FIDE rating: 2726 (September 2026)
- Peak rating: 2776 (April 2022)
- Ranking: No. 19 (September 2026)
- Peak ranking: No. 5 (May 2022)

Richárd Rapport (born 25 March 1996) is a Hungarian chess grandmaster. A chess prodigy, he earned his grandmaster title at the age of 13 years, 11 months, and six days, making him Hungary's youngest ever grandmaster. He was the Hungarian Chess Champion in 2017 and was the fifth-rated player in the world in May 2022.

== Early life ==
Rapport was born in Szombathely, Hungary, to Tamás Rapport and Erzsébet Mórocz, both economists. He learned chess at age four from his father.

== Titles ==
In 2006, he won the European Championships U10. Rapport achieved the National Master title in 2008 and became an International Master the next year. In March 2010, at the Gotth'Art Kupa in Szentgotthárd, he fulfilled the final norm and rating requirements for the Grandmaster title. He came in second on the tournament behind his trainer Alexander Beliavsky and tied with Lajos Portisch (one of the strongest non-Soviet players in the second half of the 20th century). Thus, at the age of 13 years, 11 months and 6 days, he became the youngest ever Hungarian grandmaster (the previous record was held by former world title challenger Péter Lékó), and the fifth youngest chess grandmaster in history at the time.

== Chess career ==
=== 2013 ===
In May, Rapport tied for first in the Sigeman & Co Chess Tournament, together with Nigel Short and Nils Grandelius, winning on tiebreaks (head-to-head result). He scored 4½/7 (+3−1=3).

In December, Rapport won the European Rapid Chess Championship and finished fourth in the European Blitz Chess Championship.

=== 2016 ===
From 20 to 23 December, Rapport won a match against 17-year-old Chinese player Wei Yi, held in Yancheng, China. At the time, Rapport was the highest rated junior (under 21) player at 2717, and Wei Yi was the second-highest rated at 2707. They tied a match of four classical games with a win each and two draws, then tied a tiebreak match of two blitz games, winning one each. The final tiebreak of the match was an Armageddon game, which Rapport won with the black pieces by resignation.

=== 2017 ===
At the Tata Steel Chess Tournament in January 2017 he played his first game against Magnus Carlsen and won with White in 33 moves.

He won the Hungarian Chess Championship in May 2017.

He also won the tournament that was covered by Grandmaster Simon Williams in his show called Checkmate, finishing ahead of top seed Arkadij Naiditsch and World Championship challenger Nigel Short.

=== 2019 ===
Rapport won against Sam Shankland in their match, which was part of the USA vs. The World tournament.

=== 2020 ===
Rapport won the 11th Danzhou Tournament. He was the only player to remain undefeated and finished half a point ahead of GM Ding Liren.

=== 2022 ===
Rapport won the second leg of the FIDE Grand Prix 2022 in Belgrade, Serbia. That performance, together with reaching the semi-finals in the first leg, was enough to clinch a top-two spot in the Grand Prix and qualify for the 2022 Candidates Tournament, where he finished last with a score of 5½/14.

=== 2023 ===
Rapport was one of the participants of the Tata Steel Chess Tournament 2023, in which he had a rough start by losing to chess prodigy Nodirbek Abdusattorov and later losing to World Champion Magnus Carlsen. However, he came back to defeat Indian grandmaster Arjun Erigaisi, and later in round 12 snatched a victory against the World No. 2 Chinese Grandmaster Ding Liren. Rapport finished the tournament placing 8th out of 14 with a score of 6½/13.

Rapport also played the role of Ding's second during the World Chess Championship 2023, in which Ding won against Ian Nepomniachtchi.

=== 2024 ===
Rapport played the role of Ding's second for the World Chess Championship 2024 between Ding Liren and Gukesh Dommaraju.

== National Federation ==
In May 2022, Rapport announced his intention to switch federations and represent Romania, as part of a sponsorship deal with Serbian-owned Superbet Romania. It was officially announced that he would be switching federations in September 2022.

In May 2024, it was announced that he was switching back to representing Hungary.

== Personal life ==
He has lived in Belgrade, Serbia, since the age of 18, where his wife Jovana Vojinović, a Woman Grandmaster, is from. They married in June 2016.

== Playing style ==
Rapport often uses unusual openings, even in official over-the-board tournaments. One of the most common of these is the Nimzo–Larsen Attack, also known as Larsen's Opening. He plays aggressively, normally playing for a win with both White and Black and is considered one of the more exciting players to watch.

== Notable games ==
Rapport vs. Seres, Budapest 2009

Position: a8 black rook, g8 black king, e7 black pawn, h7 black pawn, a6 black pawn, d6 black pawn, e6 white rook, g6 white knight, a5 black knight, c5 black pawn, d5 white pawn, c4 black pawn, f4 white queen, b3 white pawn, g3 white pawn, a2 white pawn, f2 white pawn, g2 white king, h2 white pawn, a1 black queen

Final position
- Rapport vs. GM Lajos Seres; First Saturday 2009 August GM, Budapest 2009.08.03, Rnd 3, ECO A89
  1.Nf3 f5 2.g3 Nf6 3.Bg2 g6 4.0-0 Bg7 5.c4 0-0 6.d4 d6 7.Nc3 Nc6 8.d5 Na5 9.b3 Ne4 10.Nxe4 Bxa1 11.Neg5 c5 12.e4 fxe4 13.Nh4 Bf6 14.Bxe4 Bxg5 15.Bxg5 Rf6 16.Re1 Qf8 17.Bxf6 Qxf6 18.Bf3 a6 19.Qe2 Kf8 20.Bg4 Bxg4 21.Qxg4 b5 22.Re6 Qa1+ 23.Kg2 bxc4 24.Qf4+ Kg8 25.Nxg6 1–0
