= World Rapid Chess Championship 2023 =

FIDE tournament in Samarkand, Uzbekistan

	World Rapid Champion	Women's World Rapid Champion
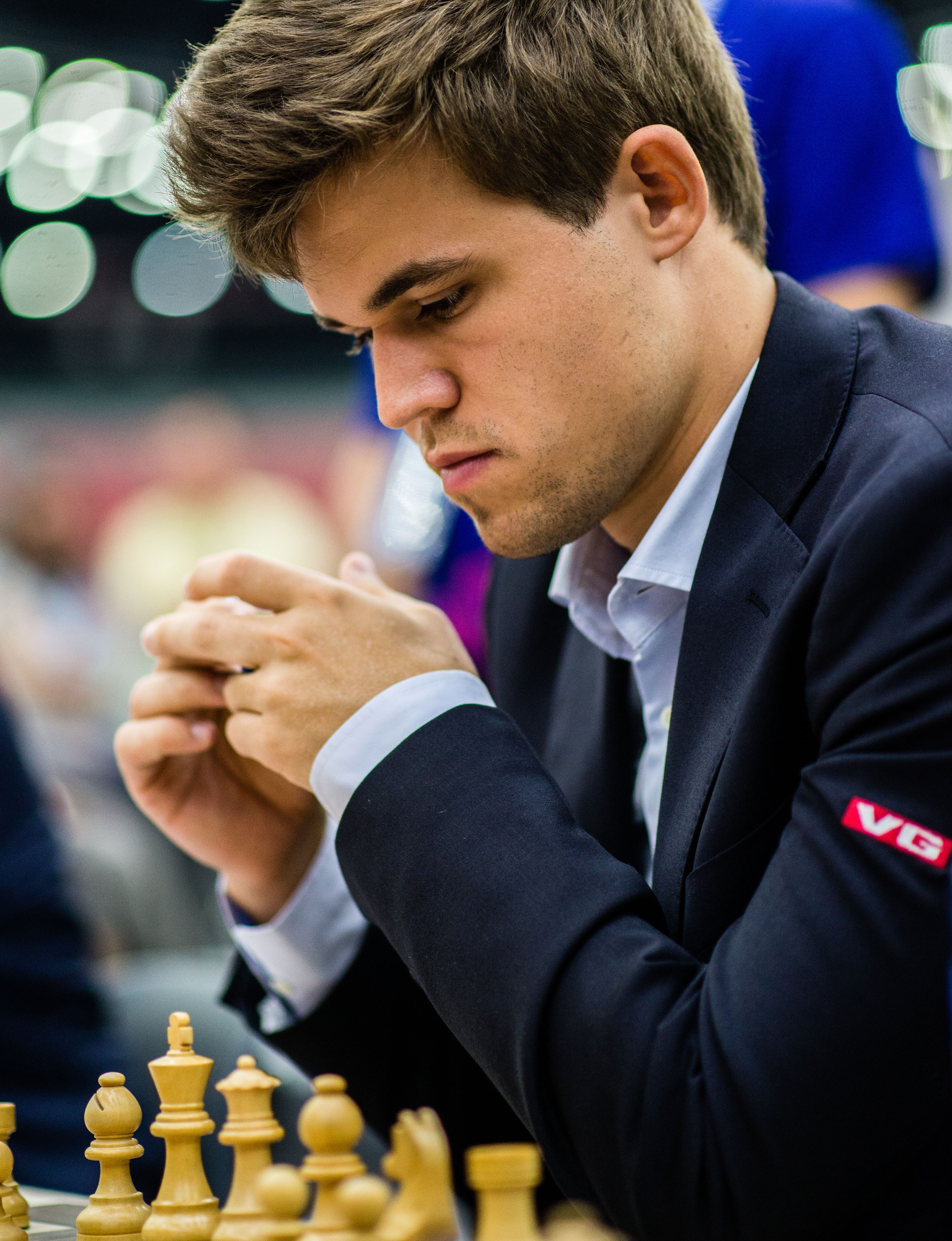
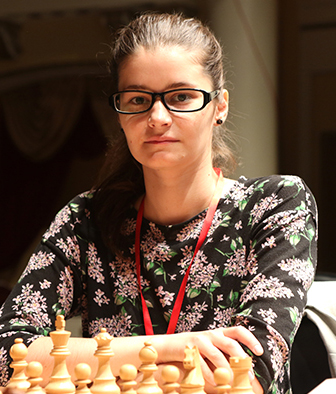
	(Norway) Magnus Carlsen	(FIDE) Anastasia Bodnaruk
10/13	Scores	8½/11 (2½/4)
	Born 30 November 1990; 33 years old	Born 30 March 1992; 31 years old
	Rating: 2818 (World No. 2)	Rating: 2265 (World No. 133)

The World Rapid Chess Championship 2023 was the 2023 edition of the annual World Rapid Chess Championship held by FIDE to determine the world champion in chess played under rapid time controls. Since 2012, FIDE has held the World Rapid and Blitz Championships at a joint tournament. The tournament was held in Samarkand, Uzbekistan from 26 to 28 December 2023, using a Swiss-system with 13 rounds for the open tournament and 11 rounds for the women's tournament. Players who were eligible to participate in the open tournament were either rated at least 2550 Elo in a FIDE rating list during 2023, or were the reigning national champion. The time control was 15 minutes per player with a 10-second per-move increment.

== Participants ==
202 players took part in the open tournament, and 117 in the women's tournament.

== Prize fund ==
The prize fund for both the open and women's tournament is shown below. In case of a tie (except for first place) all prize money was shared between the players. Players outside the brackets did not receive any prize money.

Open tournament:

- 1st place: $60,000
- 2nd place: $50,000
- 3rd place: $40,000
- 4th place: $30,000
- 5th place: $25,000
- 6th place: $22,000
- 7th place: $18,000
- 8th place: $14,000
- 9th place: $11,000
- 10th place: $8,000
- 11th–16th places: $5,000
- 17th–25th places: $3,000
- 26th–35th places: $1,500

Total: $350,000

Women's tournament:

- 1st place: $40,000
- 2nd place: $30,000
- 3rd place: $20,000
- 4th place: $15,000
- 5th place: $10,000
- 6th place: $7,000
- 7th place: $6,000
- 8th place: $5,000
- 9th place: $4,000
- 10th place: $3,000
- 11th–15th places: $2,000

Total: $150,000

== Tiebreak regulations ==
For players who finished on the same score, final position was determined by the following tie-breaks, in order:

1. Buchholz Cut 1 (the sum of the scores of each of the opponents of a player but reduced by the lowest score of the opponents)
2. Buchholz (the sum of the scores of each of the opponents of a player)
3. Average Rating of Opponents Cut 1 (average rating of opponents excluding the lowest rated opponent)
4. The results of individual games between tied players
5. Drawing of lots

If two or more players were tied for any position other than first, the above mentioned tiebreak system decided the ranking of the tied players. If there was a tie for the 1st place, a play-off would be played among all players in tie to determine the new champion.
