= Alexander Donchenko =

German chess grandmaster (born 1998)

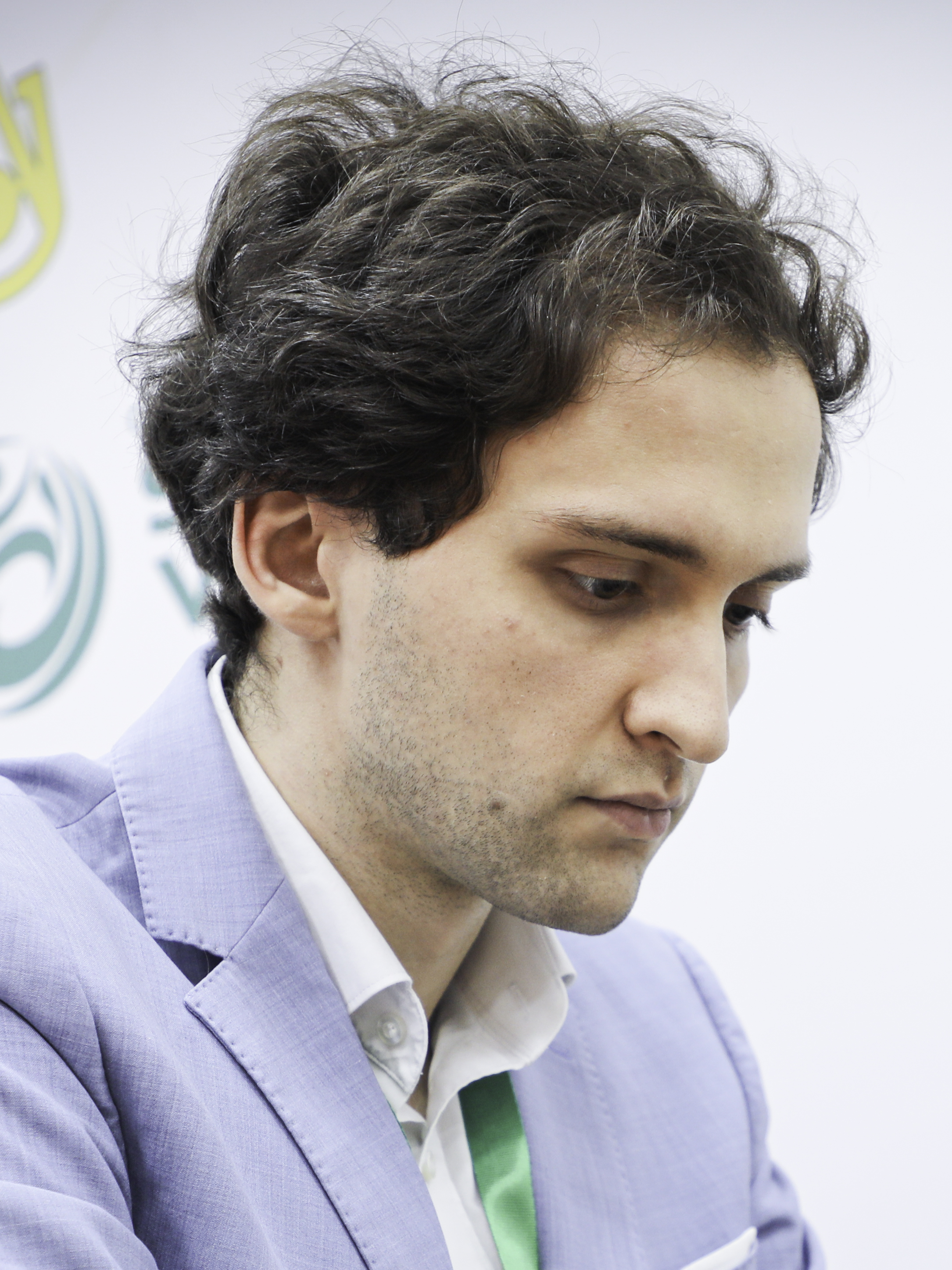
- Donchenko in 2026

Personal information
- Born: Alexander Anatolyevich Donchenko; 22 March 1998 (age 28) Moscow, Russia

Chess career
- Country: Germany
- Title: Grandmaster (2015)
- FIDE rating: 2610 (October 2026)
- Peak rating: 2684 (August 2023)
- Peak ranking: No. 49 (January 2026)

Alexander Anatolyevich Donchenko (Russian: Александр Анатольевич Донченко; born 22 March 1998) is a German chess grandmaster. He was part of the German team that won Bronze in the 46th Chess Olympiad.

== Chess career ==
Born in 1998, Donchenko earned his international master title in 2012 and his grandmaster title in 2015. In March 2018, he competed in the European Individual Chess Championship. He placed 114th, scoring 6/11 (+4–3=4). He participated in the European Championship again in 2019, placing 103rd with 6½/11 (+5–3=3).

Donchenko shared second with Gata Kamsky at the Biel Masters in July 2019 with 6½/9 (+5–1=3), half a point behind winner Amin Tabatabaei. Donchenko competed in the Barcelona Open 2019, held from 27 September to 5 October. He scored 7½/9 (+6–0=3) to take clear-first place.

Donchenko was a late replacement for Daniil Dubov in the 2021 Tata Steel Masters, as the latter withdrew due to a close associate testing positive for COVID-19. Donchenko placed last in the tournament, with a score of 3½/13 (+0–6=7).

In August 2021, he won the Riga Technical University Open "A" tournament.

In January 2023, Donchenko won Tata Steel Challengers 2023 with one round to spare, securing him a place in Tata Steel Masters in 2024.

== Personal life ==
Born in Moscow, Donchenko moved to Germany as a young child. He is the son of Anatoly Donchenko, an international master.
