= Norway Chess =

Annual chess tournament

Tournament information
- Sport: Chess
- Location: Stavanger, Norway (until 2025); Oslo, Norway (since 2026)
- Established: 2013
- Format: Round-robin tournament
- Most championships: (Norway) Magnus Carlsen (7)

Current champion
- (India) R Praggnanandhaa

Norway Chess is an annual closed chess tournament, typically taking place in the May to June time period every year. The first edition took place in the Stavanger, Norway, from 7 to 18 May 2013. The 2013 tournament had ten participants, including seven of the ten highest rated players in the world per the May 2013 FIDE World Rankings. It was won by Sergey Karjakin, with Magnus Carlsen and Hikaru Nakamura tied for second place. Norway Chess 2015 took place in mid-June 2015 and was a part of the inaugural Grand Chess Tour. The tournament has since decided to withdraw from the Grand Chess Tour.

In 2025, Norway Chess announced they were developing the Total Chess World Championship Tour, with the approval of FIDE. Total Chess World Championship 2026 will be the first Total Chess World Championship event. It will be held in Norway on 15 October 2026.

In 2026, it was held in Oslo instead of Stavanger from May 25 to June 5. Praggnanandhaa Rameshbabu from India won the open section and Bibisara Assaubayeva from Kazakhstan won the women's section. In 2026 edition, R Praggnanandhaa became the first Indian to win Norway Chess Tournament, defeating World No 1 Magnus Carlsen twice in classical games within the same event, the first player to do so since Veselin Topalov.

== Winners ==
=== Open section ===
#	Year	Winner (classical)	Winner (blitz)
1	2013	Sergey Karjakin (Russia)	Sergey Karjakin (Russia)
2	2014	Sergey Karjakin (Russia)	Magnus Carlsen (Norway)
3	2015	Veselin Topalov (Bulgaria)	Maxime Vachier-Lagrave (France)
4	2016	Magnus Carlsen (Norway)	Magnus Carlsen (Norway)
5	2017	Levon Aronian (Armenia)	Magnus Carlsen (Norway)
6	2018	Fabiano Caruana (United States)	Wesley So (United States)
7	2019	Magnus Carlsen (Norway)	Maxime Vachier-Lagrave (France)
8	2020	Magnus Carlsen (Norway)	–
9	2021	Magnus Carlsen (Norway)	–
10	2022	Magnus Carlsen (Norway)	Wesley So (United States)
11	2023	Hikaru Nakamura (United States)	Nodirbek Abdusattorov (Uzbekistan)
12	2024	Magnus Carlsen (Norway)	–
13	2025	Magnus Carlsen (Norway)	–
14	2026	R Praggnanandhaa (India)	–

=== Women's section ===
#	Year	Winner (classical)
1	2024	Ju Wenjun (China)
2	2025	Anna Muzychuk (Ukraine)
3	2026	Bibisara Assaubayeva (Kazakhstan)

== 2013 ==
The 2013 tournament started with a blitz round played at the University of Stavanger on 7 May 2013. Rounds 1-3, 5-6, and 8 were played at Hotel Residence, Sandnes. Round 4 was played at Aarbakke factory in Bryne, and round 8 was played on the island Sør-Hidle in Strand Municipality. The final round 9 was played in Stavanger Concert Hall on 18 May 2013. In addition to the super tournament, there was a local school tournament and a celebrity tournament. Partly parallel to the tournament, Stavanger Open NGP 2013 was arranged by Stavanger Chess Club from 8 to 12 May. Games were streamed live with Dirk Jan ten Geuzendam and Simen Agdestein as commentators.

The tournament was arranged by the foundation Norway Chess, with economic support from local businesses and municipalities within the Rogaland county. The cost of the arrangement was predicted to be about 5 million Norwegian kroner (approximately 672,000 euro), of which about half was for prizes for the participants. The organizers planned to make the tournament a yearly event.

Vladimir Kramnik was originally among the expected participants, but in April 2013 it was announced that he had withdrawn and was replaced with Peter Svidler.

=== Blitz tournament ===
On 7 May 2013, a blitz tournament was played to decide the play order for the main tournament. According to the regulations, the winner of the blitz tournament had the right to choose the number in the table by his own, and Sergey Karjakin chose to be fifth in the main tournament table.

1st Supreme Masters Blitz, 7 May 2013, Sandnes, Rogaland county, Norway
	Player	Blitz rating	1	2	3	4	5	6	7	8	9	10	Points	Black	WB	SB
1	Sergey Karjakin (Russia)	2873		1	0	1	0	1	1	1	½	1	6½			
2	Magnus Carlsen (Norway)	2856	0		½	1	1	0	1	½	1	1	6	5		
3	Viswanathan Anand (India)	2783	1	½		0	1	1	0	1	1	½	6	4	2	26.00
4	Hikaru Nakamura (USA)	2844	0	0	1		½	½	1	1	1	1	6	4	1	21.25
5	Peter Svidler (Russia)	2757	1	0	0	½		1	1	0	1	1	5½			
6	Teimour Radjabov (Azerbaijan)	2755	0	1	0	½	0		½	1	1	1	5			
7	Jon Ludvig Hammer (Norway)	2608	0	0	1	0	0	½		1	½	½	3½			
8	Wang Hao (China)	2698	0	½	0	0	1	0	0		½	1	3			
9	Levon Aronian (Armenia)	2817	½	0	0	0	0	0	½	½		1	2½			
10	Veselin Topalov (Bulgaria)	2666	0	0	½	0	0	0	0	½	0		1			

Second, third and fourth place were decided by tiebreakers: Carlsen on most games with black pieces; Anand with two victories with black against Nakamura's one victory.

=== Classical tournament ===
1st Supreme Masters, 8–18 May 2013, Sandnes – Bryne – Sør-Hidle – Stavanger, Norway, Cat. XXI (2766)
	Player	Rating	1	2	3	4	5	6	7	8	9	10	Points	SB	TPR
1	Sergey Karjakin (Russia)	2767		0	1	0	1	½	1	½	1	1	6		2891
2	Magnus Carlsen (Norway)	2868	1		½	½	½	½	0	½	1	1	5½	22.75	2835
3	Hikaru Nakamura (United States)	2775	0	½		½	0	1	1	½	1	1	5½	21.25	2845
4	Peter Svidler (Russia)	2769	1	½	½		½	½	0	½	½	1	5	21.50	2809
5	Levon Aronian (Armenia)	2813	0	½	1	½		½	½	½	½	1	5	20.50	2804
6	Viswanathan Anand (India)	2783	½	½	0	½	½		0	1	1	1	5	19.25	2807
7	Wang Hao (China)	2743	0	1	0	1	½	1		½	½	0	4½		2769
8	Veselin Topalov (Bulgaria)	2793	½	½	½	½	½	0	½		½	½	4		2720
9	Teimour Radjabov (Azerbaijan)	2745	0	0	0	½	½	0	½	½		1	3		2643
10	Jon Ludvig Hammer (Norway)	2608	0	0	0	0	0	0	1	½	0		1½		2511

The tiebreakers were: Sonneborn–Berger score, most wins, most wins with black. In case of a tie for first place, a two-game blitz match (or blitz tournament) and an armageddon game were scheduled.

== 2014 ==
The second edition took place from 2 to 13 June 2014. The ten participants were Magnus Carlsen, Levon Aronian, Vladimir Kramnik, Veselin Topalov, Fabiano Caruana, Alexander Grischuk, Sergey Karjakin, Peter Svidler, Anish Giri and Simen Agdestein. Agdestein qualified by defeating Jon Ludvig Hammer in a rapid match that took place from 26 to 27 April 2014.

=== Blitz tournament ===
On 2 June 2014, a blitz tournament was played to decide the play order for the main tournament.

2nd Norway Chess Blitz, 2 June 2014, Flor og Fjære, Sør-Hidle, Norway
	Player	Blitz rating	1	2	3	4	5	6	7	8	9	10	Points	Black	WB
1	Magnus Carlsen (Norway)	2837		½	1	½	1	1	½	1	1	1	7½		
2	Levon Aronian (Armenia)	2863	½		0	½	1	1	1	½	1	1	6½		
3	Sergey Karjakin (Russia)	2866	0	1		0	½	0	1	1	1	1	5½	5	
4	Alexander Grischuk (Russia)	2801	½	½	1		½	0	1	1	½	½	5½	4	
5	Peter Svidler (Russia)	2757	0	0	½	½		1	0	1	1	1	5		
6	Anish Giri (Netherlands)	2755	0	0	1	1	0		1	0	½	1	4½		
7	Vladimir Kramnik (Russia)	2782	½	0	0	0	1	0		½	½	1	3½	5	1
8	Fabiano Caruana (Italy)	2697	0	½	0	0	0	1	½		½	1	3½	5	0
9	Veselin Topalov (Bulgaria)	2666	0	0	0	½	0	½	½	½		0	2		
10	Simen Agdestein (Norway)	2577	0	0	0	½	0	0	0	0	1		1½		

The places 3, 4, 7 and 8 were decided by tiebreakers: Karjakin on most games with black pieces, Kramnik with one victory with black against Caruana's zero victories.

=== Classical tournament ===
2nd Unibet Norway Chess, 3–14 June 2014, Stavanger, Norway, Category XXI (2774)
	Player	Rating	1	2	3	4	5	6	7	8	9	10	Points	SB	Wins	TPR
1	Sergey Karjakin (Russia)	2771		½	1	1	½	0	½	1	1	½	6			2899
2	Magnus Carlsen (Norway)	2881	½		½	½	½	1	½	½	½	1	5½			2841
3	Alexander Grischuk (Russia)	2792	0	½		0	1	1	½	½	1	½	5			2814
4	Fabiano Caruana (Italy)	2791	0	½	1		½	½	1	½	0	½	4½	19.75		2771
5	Veselin Topalov (Bulgaria)	2772	½	½	0	½		½	½	0	1	1	4½	19.50		2774
6	Levon Aronian (Armenia)	2815	1	0	0	½	½		½	½	½	½	4	18.25	1	2726
7	Peter Svidler (Russia)	2753	½	½	½	0	½	½		½	½	½	4	18.25	0	2733
8	Anish Giri (Netherlands)	2752	0	½	½	½	1	½	½		0	½	4	17.75		2733
9	Vladimir Kramnik (Russia)	2783	0	½	0	1	0	½	½	1		½	4	17.00		2729
10	Simen Agdestein (Norway)	2628	½	0	½	½	0	½	½	½	½		3½			2710

The tiebreakers were: Sonneborn–Berger score, most wins, most wins with black. In case of a tie for first place, a two-game blitz match (or blitz tournament) and an armageddon game were scheduled.

== 2015 ==
The third edition of the tournament took place from 15 to 26 June 2015. This was the first tournament of a three tournament series in the inaugural Grand Chess Tour, where participants accumulated as many points as possible over the three tournaments for prizes in the overall tour. The players were Magnus Carlsen, Viswanathan Anand, Levon Aronian, Veselin Topalov, Hikaru Nakamura, Fabiano Caruana, Alexander Grischuk, Anish Giri, Maxime Vachier-Lagrave, and Jon Ludvig Hammer. Jon Ludvig Hammer was not invited to the overall Grand Chess Tour; however, he qualified for the 10th spot in the tournament by winning the Enter Card Scandinavian Masters Tournament in May 2015.

=== Wildcard qualifier ===
Jon Ludvig Hammer won the event to qualify as the wildcard for the main tournament.

	Player	Classical								Rapid								Total Points
	Player	Rating	1	2	3	4	5	6	Points	Rating	1	2	3	4	5	6	Points	Total Points
1	GM Jon Ludvig Hammer (Norway)	2665		1	1	2	2	2	8	2578		1	½	½	1	1	4	12
2	GM Laurent Fressinet (France)	2712	1		2	1	2	2	8	2707	0		½	½	1	1	3	11
3	IM Aryan Tari (Norway)	2520	1	0		1	1	1	4	2442	½	½		½	1	1	3½	7½
4	GM Nils Grandelius (Sweden)	2623	0	1	1		2	1	5	2623	½	½	½		0	0	1½	6½
5	GM Curt Hansen (Denmark)	2621	0	0	1	0		2	3	2621	0	0	0	1		½	1½	4½
6	GM Simen Agdestein (Norway)	2620	0	0	1	1	0		2	2575	0	0	0	1	½		1½	3½

=== Blitz tournament ===
On 15 June 2015, a blitz tournament was played to decide the play order for the main tournament. It was won by Maxime Vachier-Lagrave of France.

3rd Norway Chess Blitz, 15 June 2015, Stavanger, Norway
	Player	Blitz rating	1	2	3	4	5	6	7	8	9	10	Points	Black	Wins	Black wins
1	Maxime Vachier-Lagrave (France)	2826		0	½	1	½	1	½	1	1	1	6½			
2	Hikaru Nakamura (United States)	2883	1		½	0	½	1	0	1	1	1	6			
3	Viswanathan Anand (India)	2767	½	½		0	0	1	1	½	1	1	5½	5	4	3
4	Magnus Carlsen (Norway)	2933	0	1	1		½	½	0	1	½	1	5½	5	4	2
5	Anish Giri (Netherlands)	2771	½	½	1	½		0	½	½	1	1	5½	4		
6	Levon Aronian (Armenia)	2816	0	0	0	½	1		½	1	1	1	5			
7	Alexander Grischuk (Russia)	2839	½	1	0	1	½	½		0	0	½	4			
8	Veselin Topalov (Bulgaria)	2641	0	0	½	0	½	0	1		0	1	3			
9	Fabiano Caruana (Italy)	2679	0	0	0	½	0	0	1	1		0	2½			
10	Jon Ludvig Hammer (Norway)	2648	0	0	0	0	0	0	½	0	1		1½			

=== Classical tournament ===
3rd Norway Chess, 16–25 June 2015, Stavanger, Norway, Category XXII (2782)
	Player	Rating	1	2	3	4	5	6	7	8	9	10	Points	Wins	H2H	SB	TPR
1	Veselin Topalov (Bulgaria)	2798		½	½	0	½	1	1	1	1	1	6½				2946
2	Viswanathan Anand (India)	2804	½		½	½	½	1	1	½	½	1	6	3	½	24.75	2904
3	Hikaru Nakamura (United States)	2802	½	½		½	1	½	½	½	1	1	6	3	½	24.50	2904
4	Anish Giri (Netherlands)	2773	1	½	½		½	½	½	1	½	½	5½				2862
5	Fabiano Caruana (Italy)	2805	½	½	0	½		½	1	½	0	½	4	1	½	17.75	2736
6	Maxime Vachier-Lagrave (France)	2723	0	0	½	½	½		½	½	1	½	4	1	½	15.75	2745
7	Magnus Carlsen (Norway)	2876	0	0	½	½	0	½		1	1	0	3½	2			2691
8	Alexander Grischuk (Russia)	2781	0	½	½	0	½	½	0		½	1	3½	1			2702
9	Levon Aronian (Armenia)	2780	0	½	0	½	1	0	0	½		½	3	1	½	13.00	2657
10	Jon Ludvig Hammer (Norway)	2677	0	0	0	½	½	½	1	0	½		3	1	½	11.75	2668

The tiebreakers were: most wins, direct encounter, Sonneborn–Berger system, extended Koya system.

== 2016 ==
The fourth Norway Chess Tournament took place from 18 to 30 April 2016 with a new title sponsor, Altibox. The tournament withdrew from the Grand Chess Tour in early January 2016 citing differences on the future of chess supertournaments and tournament sponsorship.

The players were initially announced as Magnus Carlsen, Vladimir Kramnik, Anish Giri, Levon Aronian, Maxime Vachier-Lagrave, Veselin Topalov, Sergey Karjakin, Pavel Eljanov, Pentala Harikrishna, and a wildcard to be determined in a qualifying tournament.

On 6 April, Karjakin decided not to play in the tournament. His spot was taken by Li Chao.

=== Wild card qualifier ===
A qualifying tournament took place from 23 to 26 March 2016. It was a double round robin consisting of two stages: the first leg was played with a classical time control and 3–1–0 scoring system; the second leg was played with a rapid time control and 2–1–0 scoring system. It was won by Nils Grandelius.

	Player	Classical						Rapid						Total Points
	Player	Rating	1	2	3	4	Points	Rating	1	2	3	4	Points	Total Points
1	Nils Grandelius (Sweden)	2646		3	1	3	7	2598		2	2	1	5	12
2	Jon Ludvig Hammer (Norway)	2701	0		3	3	6	2620	0		0	2	2	8
3	Hou Yifan (China)	2667	1	0		1	2	2625	0	2		2	4	6
4	Aryan Tari (Norway)	2553	0	0	1		1	2532	1	0	0		1	2

=== Blitz tournament ===
On 18 April 2016, a blitz tournament was conducted to determine the pairings in the tournament. The top 5 finishers in the blitz tournament earned an extra white game in the tournament.

The following is the final crosstable of the event (obtained from chess.com). Magnus Carlsen, Anish Giri, Maxime Vachier-Lagrave, Vladimir Kramnik, and Levon Aronian finished in the top 5 and, thus, earned their extra white game.

4th Altibox Norway Chess Blitz, 18 April 2016, Stavanger, Norway
	Player	Blitz rating	1	2	3	4	5	6	7	8	9	10	Points	SB	TPR
1	Magnus Carlsen (Norway)	2890		0	1	1	1	1	1	½	1	1	7½		3040
2	Anish Giri (Netherlands)	2793	1		0	½	½	1	½	1	1	1	6½		2933
3	Maxime Vachier-Lagrave (France)	2872	0	1		½	½	1	0	1	1	1	6	23.25	2888
4	Vladimir Kramnik (Russia)	2817	0	½	½		½	1	1	½	1	1	6	21.75	2886
5	Levon Aronian (Armenia)	2814	0	½	½	½		1	½	½	½	½	4½		2769
6	Pentala Harikrishna (India)	2774	0	0	0	0	0		1	1	1	1	4		2733
7	Veselin Topalov (Bulgaria)	2647	0	½	1	0	½	0		½	0	½	3		2652
8	Nils Grandelius (Sweden)	2604	½	0	0	½	½	0	½		½	0	2½	11.75	2618
9	Li Chao (China)	2633	0	0	0	0	½	0	1	½		½	2½	7.75	2606
10	Pavel Eljanov (Ukraine)	2679	0	0	0	0	½	0	½	1	½		2½	7.50	2605

=== Classical tournament ===
4th Altibox Norway Chess, 19–30 April 2016, Stavanger, Norway, Category XXI (2770)
	Player	Rating	1	2	3	4	5	6	7	8	9	10	Points	SB	TPR
1	Magnus Carlsen (Norway)	2851		0	½	½	1	½	1	½	1	1	6		2886
2	Levon Aronian (Armenia)	2784	1		½	½	½	½	½	½	1	½	5½		2848
3	Maxime Vachier-Lagrave (France)	2788	½	½		½	½	½	½	1	½	½	5	22.00	2811
4	Veselin Topalov (Bulgaria)	2754	½	½	½		½	½	½	½	½	1	5	21.25	2814
5	Vladimir Kramnik (Russia)	2801	0	½	½	½		½	1	½	½	1	5	20.25	2809
6	Li Chao (China)	2755	½	½	½	½	½		0	½	1	½	4½	19.50	2771
7	Pentala Harikrishna (India)	2763	0	½	½	½	0	1		1	½	½	4½	19.00	2770
8	Anish Giri (Netherlands)	2790	½	½	0	½	½	½	0		1	½	4		2724
9	Pavel Eljanov (Ukraine)	2765	0	0	½	½	½	0	½	0		1	3		2645
10	Nils Grandelius (Sweden)	2649	0	½	½	0	0	½	½	½	0		2½		2617

== 2017 ==
The fifth Norway Chess tournament was held between 6–16 June 2017. The tournament involved all ten of the world's best players by rating (at the time of announcement) and had an average Elo rating of 2797. As a result, it was billed as the strongest chess tournament in history by Altibox, its sponsor. However, by the time the tournament was held two players had dropped out of the top ten (Karjakin and Giri; their replacements Mamedyarov and Ding Liren did not play). It was also not the tournament with the highest-ever rating average; the 2014 Zurich Chess Challenge and the 2014 Sinquefield Cup had average ratings of 2801 and 2802, respectively.

=== Blitz tournament ===
On 5 June 2017, a Blitz tournament was conducted to determine the pairings in the tournament. The top 5 finishers in the blitz tournament earned an extra white game in the tournament. Magnus Carlsen, Hikaru Nakamura, Levon Aronian, Maxime Vachier-Lagrave and Vladimir Kramnik finished in the top 5 and earned their extra white game.

5th Altibox Norway Chess Blitz, 5 June 2017, Stavanger, Norway
	Player	Blitz rating	1	2	3	4	5	6	7	8	9	10	Points	SB	TPR
1	Magnus Carlsen (Norway)	2914		½	1	1	½	1	½	1	1	1	7½		3066
2	Hikaru Nakamura (United States)	2865	½		½	½	½	0	½	1	1	1	5½		2879
3	Levon Aronian (Armenia)	2753	0	½		½	½	1	½	1	½	1	5½		2878
4	Maxime Vachier-Lagrave (France)	2825	0	½	½		1	0	1	1	0	1	5		2840
5	Vladimir Kramnik (Russia)	2744	½	½	½	0		1	1	½	0	½	4½	20.50	2796
6	Sergey Karjakin (Russia)	2791	0	1	0	1	0		½	0	1	1	4½	17.00	2799
7	Viswanathan Anand (India)	2766	½	½	½	0	0	½		½	1	½	4	17.25	2755
8	Wesley So (United States)	2791	0	0	0	0	½	1	½		1	1	4	13.25	2753
9	Fabiano Caruana (United States)	2800	0	0	½	1	1	0	0	0		½	3		2606
10	Anish Giri (Netherlands)	2776	0	0	0	0	½	0	½	0	½		1½		2527

=== Classical tournament ===
5th Altibox Norway Chess, 6–17 June 2017, Stavanger, Norway, Category XXII (2797)
	Player	Rating	1	2	3	4	5	6	7	8	9	10	Points	SB	TPR
1	Levon Aronian (Armenia)	2793		½	1	½	½	½	½	½	1	1	6		2918
2	Hikaru Nakamura (United States)	2785	½		½	0	½	1	1	½	½	½	5	22.00	2837
3	Vladimir Kramnik (Russia)	2808	0	½		½	½	1	0	1	1	½	5	21.25	2834
4	Fabiano Caruana (United States)	2808	½	1	½		½	½	½	0	½	½	4½	20.75	2796
5	Wesley So (United States)	2812	½	½	½	½		½	½	½	½	½	4½	20.25	2796
6	Anish Giri (Netherlands)	2771	½	0	0	½	½		1	1	½	½	4½	19.25	2800
7	Maxime Vachier-Lagrave (France)	2796	½	0	1	½	½	0		½	½	½	4	18.25	2759
8	Viswanathan Anand (India)	2786	½	½	0	1	½	0	½		½	½	4	18.00	2760
9	Magnus Carlsen (Norway)	2832	0	½	0	½	½	½	½	½		1	4	16.75	2755
10	Sergey Karjakin (Russia)	2781	0	½	½	½	½	½	½	½	0		3½		2721

== 2018 ==
=== Blitz tournament ===
The blitz tournament was played on 27 May 2018. The winner of the blitz tournament chose his number in the main tournament. Number 2 got the highest available number, and number 3 the second highest, and so on.

6th Altibox Norway Chess Blitz, 27 May 2018, Stavanger, Norway
	Player	Blitz rating	1	2	3	4	5	6	7	8	9	10	Points	SB
1	Wesley So (United States)	2824		½	½	0	1	½	1	1	½	1	6	
2	Hikaru Nakamura (United States)	2869	½		½	½	½	½	½	1	1	½	5½	23.00
3	Viswanathan Anand (India)	2784	½	½		½	½	1	0	½	1	1	5½	22.75
4	Magnus Carlsen (Norway)	2965	1	½	½		½	½	1	½	0	½	5	
5	Shakhriyar Mamedyarov (Azerbaijan)	2730	0	½	½	½		1	1	0	0	1	4½	20.00
6	Maxime Vachier-Lagrave (France)	2839	½	½	0	½	0		1	½	1	½	4½	19.00
7	Fabiano Caruana (United States)	2814	0	½	1	0	0	0		1	1	1	4½	17.75
8	Sergey Karjakin (Russia)	2838	0	0	½	½	1	½	0		1	0	3½	
9	Levon Aronian (Armenia)	2843	½	0	0	1	1	0	0	0		½	3	14.00
10	Ding Liren (China)	2793	0	½	0	½	0	½	0	1	½		3	12.50

=== Classical tournament ===
6th Altibox Norway Chess, 28 May – 7 June 2018, Stavanger, Norway, Category XXII (2791)
	Player	Rating	1	2	3	4	5	6	7	8	9	10	Points	SB	TPR
1	Fabiano Caruana (United States)	2822		0	½	1	1	½	½	½	1	–	5		2882
2	Magnus Carlsen (Norway)	2843	1		½	½	0	1	½	½	½	–	4½	18.25	2827
3	Hikaru Nakamura (United States)	2769	½	½		½	½	½	½	½	1	~~½~~	4½	17.25	2836
4	Viswanathan Anand (India)	2760	0	½	½		½	½	½	1	1	~~½~~	4½	16.25	2837
5	Wesley So (United States)	2778	0	1	½	½		½	½	½	½	–	4	15.75	2792
6	Levon Aronian (Armenia)	2764	½	0	½	½	½		1	½	½	–	4	15.50	2794
7	Shakhriyar Mamedyarov (Azerbaijan)	2808	½	½	½	½	½	0		½	½	–	3½		2746
8	Maxime Vachier-Lagrave (France)	2789	½	½	½	0	½	½	½		0	~~½~~	3	12.75	2711
9	Sergey Karjakin (Russia)	2782	0	½	0	0	½	½	½	1		–	3	11.00	2705
—N/a	Ding Liren (China)	2791	–	–	~~½~~	~~½~~	–	–	–	~~½~~	–		—N/a		2773

On 31 May 2018, Ding Liren fractured his hip bone in a bicycle accident and underwent surgery the next morning. It was announced on 2 June that Ding had withdrawn from the tournament. Due to him having played less than half the rounds, the three draws (against Nakamura, Vachier-Lagrave and Anand) that he had played in rounds 1–3 were discounted for tournament purposes, and counted only for rating purposes.

== 2019 ==
=== Blitz tournament ===
7th Altibox Norway Chess Blitz, 3 June 2019, Stavanger, Norway
	Player	Blitz rating	1	2	3	4	5	6	7	8	9	10	Points	SB	Wins	TPR
1	Maxime Vachier-Lagrave (France)	2921		1	1	1	1	1	1	0	½	1	7½			3057
2	Levon Aronian (Armenia)	2827	0		1	½	½	1	1	½	½	1	6	23.75		2912
3	Magnus Carlsen (Norway)	2923	0	0		1	½	1	½	1	1	1	6	21.50		2899
4	Shakhriyar Mamedyarov (Azerbaijan)	2757	0	½	0		0	1	1	1	½	1	5			2828
5	Ding Liren (China)	2773	0	½	½	1		0	1	½	½	½	4½			2781
6	Yu Yangyi (China)	2705	0	0	0	0	1		½	1	1	0	3½	12.25	3	2709
7	Wesley So (United States)	2759	0	0	½	0	0	½		1	½	1	3½	12.25	2	2707
8	Fabiano Caruana (United States)	2804	1	½	0	0	½	0	0		1	0	3	15.75		2655
9	Viswanathan Anand (India)	2747	½	½	0	½	½	0	½	0		½	3	14.75		2661
10	Alexander Grischuk (Russia)	2750	0	0	0	0	½	1	0	1	½		3	10.25		2660

=== Classical tournament ===
The tournament regulations for the classical tournament were different than other tournaments. Players were awarded 2 points for a win, and 0 points for a loss. In the case of draws, the players would move on to an Armageddon game, with 10 minutes for white and 7 minutes for black, with black having draw odds. Players were awarded 1½ points for a draw and an Armageddon win, and ½ a point for a draw and an Armageddon loss.

7th Altibox Norway Chess, 4–15 June 2019, Stavanger, Norway, Category XXII (2784)
	Player	Rating	1	2	3	4	5	6	7	8	9	10	Points	SB	TPR
1	Magnus Carlsen (Norway)	2875		1½	2	½	1½	1½	1½	1½	1½	2	13½		2854
2	Levon Aronian (Armenia)	2752	½		1½	0	1½	1½	1½	½	2	1½	10½	48.00	2787
3	Yu Yangyi (China)	2738	0	½		1½	0	1½	1½	1½	2	2	10½	45.50	2789
4	Fabiano Caruana (United States)	2819	1½	2	½		½	0	1½	2	½	1½	10	45.50	2823
5	Wesley So (United States)	2754	½	½	2	1½		½	½	1½	1½	1½	10	39.50	2830
6	Ding Liren (China)	2805	½	½	½	2	1½		½	½	2	½	8½		2861
7	Viswanathan Anand (India)	2767	½	½	½	½	1½	1½		1½	0	1½	8	32.00	2743
8	Maxime Vachier-Lagrave (France)	2779	½	1½	½	0	½	1½	½		1½	1½	8	30.00	2741
9	Shakhriyar Mamedyarov (Azerbaijan)	2774	½	0	0	1½	½	0	2	½		½	5½	18.00	2705
10	Alexander Grischuk (Russia)	2775	0	½	0	½	½	1½	½	½	1½		5½	14.00	2705

== 2020 ==
The performance rating is based on classical games only. As with 2019, an Armageddon game was to follow if the main classical game ended in a draw. The points system was altered to award 3 points for a win, 0 points for a loss, 1½ points for a draw and an Armageddon win and 1 point for a draw and an Armageddon loss.

8th Norway Chess, 5–16 October 2020, Stavanger, Norway, Category XXI (2763)
	Player	Rating	1	2	3	4	5	6	Points	TPR
1	Magnus Carlsen (Norway)	2863		1½ 3	1½ 0	3 1½	0 3	3 3	19½	2853
2	Alireza Firouzja (FIDE)	2728	1 0		1½ 1½	1½ 1	3 3	3 3	18½	2880
3	Levon Aronian (Armenia)	2767	1 3	1 1		3 0	3 1	3 1½	17½	2872
4	Fabiano Caruana (United States)	2828	0 1	1 1½	0 3		3 1½	3 1½	15½	2786
5	Jan-Krzysztof Duda (Poland)	2757	3 0	0 0	0 1½	0 1		1 3	9½	2654
6	Aryan Tari (Norway)	2633	0 0	0 0	0 1	0 1	1½ 0		3½	2493

== 2021 ==
9th Norway Chess, 7–18 September 2021, Stavanger, Norway, Category XXI (2760)
	Player	Rating	1	2	3	4	5	6	Points	TPR
1	Magnus Carlsen (Norway)	2855		1½ 3	1½ 3	1½ 1½	0 3	1½ 3	19½	2852
2	Alireza Firouzja (France)	2754	1 0		0 3	1 3	1 3	3 3	18	2874
3	Richárd Rapport (Hungary)	2760	1 0	3 0		1 1	1½ 3	3 3	16½	2834
4	Ian Nepomniachtchi (Russia)	2792	1 1	1½ 0	1½ 1½		3 1	1½ 0	12	2717
5	Sergey Karjakin (Russia)	2758	3 0	1½ 0	1 0	0 1½		1½ 1½	10	2649
6	Aryan Tari (Norway)	2642	1 0	0 0	0 0	1 3	1 1		7	2634

== 2022 ==
=== Blitz tournament ===
10th Norway Chess Blitz, 30 May 2022, Stavanger, Norway
	Player	Rating	1	2	3	4	5	6	7	8	9	10	Points	SB	H2H	Wins
1	Wesley So (United States)	2814		1	½	½	½	1	1	1	0	1	6½			
2	Magnus Carlsen (Norway)	2832	0		½	0	½	1	1	1	1	½	5½			
3	Anish Giri (Netherlands)	2766	½	½		1	½	½	0	1	1	0	5	22.25	1	
4	Viswanathan Anand (India)	2758	½	1	0		½	1	0	1	½	½	5	22.25	0	
5	Shakhriyar Mamedyarov (Azerbaijan)	2778	½	½	½	½		0	1	1	½	½	5	21.50		
6	Aryan Tari (Norway)	2567	0	0	½	0	1		1	0	1	1	4½			
7	Maxime Vachier-Lagrave (France)	2813	0	0	1	1	0	0		0	1	1	4			
8	Veselin Topalov (Bulgaria)	2667	0	0	0	0	0	1	1		1	½	3½			
9	Wang Hao (China)	2712	1	0	0	½	½	0	0	0		1	3	14.50	1	
10	Teimour Radjabov (Azerbaijan)	2705	0	½	1	½	½	0	0	½	0		3	14.50	0	

=== Classical tournament ===
Seeding was based on a blitz tournament played before the classical event. A classical win was worth 3 points and a loss 0 points. If the classical game was drawn, an armageddon game was played, with the same colours as the classical game. The player who won the armageddon game received 1½ points and the loser 1 point.

10th Norway Chess, 31 May – 11 June 2022, Stavanger, Norway, Category XXI (2754)
	Player	Rating	1	2	3	4	5	6	7	8	9	10	Points	SB	TPR
1	Magnus Carlsen (Norway)	2864		3	1	1½	1	3	1½	1	3	1½	16½		2865
2	Shakhriyar Mamedyarov (Azerbaijan)	2770	0		3	1	1½	3	1½	1½	1	3	15½		2833
3	Viswanathan Anand (India)	2751	1½	0		3	1	1½	3	1½	1½	1½	14½		2794
4	Maxime Vachier-Lagrave (France)	2750	1	1½	0		3	1½	1½	3	1	1½	14		2794
5	Wesley So (United States)	2766	1½	1	1½	0		1½	1	1½	3	1½	12½		2752
6	Anish Giri (Netherlands)	2761	0	0	1	1	1		1½	3	3	1½	12		2753
7	Veselin Topalov (Bulgaria)	2730	1	1	0	1	1½	1		1½	1½	1	9½		2717
8	Aryan Tari (Norway)	2654	1½	1	1	0	1	0	1		1	3	9½		2725
9	Teimour Radjabov (Azerbaijan)	2753	0	1½	1	1½	0	0	1	1½		1½	8		2630
10	Wang Hao (China)	2744	1	0	1	1	1	1	1½	0	1		7½		2631

== 2023 ==
=== Blitz tournament ===
11th Norway Chess Blitz, 29 May 2023, Stavanger, Norway
	Player	Rating	1	2	3	4	5	6	7	8	9	10	Points	H2H	SB	Wins
1	Nodirbek Abdusattorov (Uzbekistan)	2683		½	½	1	1	0	0	1	1	1	6			
2	Alireza Firouzja (France)	2904	½		1	0	0	½	½	1	1	1	5½	1		
3	Shakhriyar Mamedyarov (Azerbaijan)	2704	½	0		1	½	0	1	½	1	1	5½	0		
4	Fabiano Caruana (United States)	2837	0	1	0		½	1	0	½	1	1	5	1½		
5	Wesley So (United States)	2749	0	1	½	½		½	½	½	½	1	5	1		
6	Hikaru Nakamura (United States)	2885	1	½	1	0	½		0	½	1	½	5	½		
7	Magnus Carlsen (Norway)	2852	1	½	0	1	½	1		½	0	0	4½			
8	Anish Giri (Netherlands)	2807	0	0	½	½	½	½	½		1	0	3½			
9	Aryan Tari (Norway)	2571	0	0	0	0	½	0	1	0		1	2½	1		
10	Gukesh Dommaraju (India)	2629	0	0	0	0	0	½	1	1	0		2½	0		

=== Classical tournament ===
Seeding was based on a blitz tournament played before the classical event. A classical win was worth 3 points and a loss 0 points. If the classical game was drawn, an armageddon game was played, with the same colours as the classical game. The player who won the armageddon game received 1½ points and the loser 1 point.

11th Norway Chess, 30 May – 9 June 2023, Stavanger, Norway, Category XXI (2755)
	Player	Rating	1	2	3	4	5	6	7	8	9	10	Points	TPR
1	Hikaru Nakamura (United States)	2775		3	3	1½	1	1	1½	1½	1	3	16½	2827
2	Fabiano Caruana (United States)	2764	0		1	1½	1½	3	0	3	3	3	16	2794
3	Gukesh Dommaraju (India)	2732	0	1½		1½	1½	1	1½	3	1½	3	14½	2798
4	Anish Giri (Netherlands)	2768	1	1	1		1½	1	1½	1½	1½	3	13	2794
5	Wesley So (United States)	2760	1½	1	1	1		1	1½	1	3	1½	12½	2795
6	Magnus Carlsen (Norway)	2853	1½	0	1½	1½	1½		1½	1½	1	1½	11½	2744
7	Shakhriyar Mamedyarov (Azerbaijan)	2738	1	3	1	1	1	1		0	1½	1½	11	2757
8	Alireza Firouzja (France)	2785	1	0	0	1	1½	1	3		3	0	10½	2711
9	Nodirbek Abdusattorov (Uzbekistan)	2731	1½	0	1	1	0	1½	1	0		3	9	2676
10	Aryan Tari (Norway)	2642	0	0	0	0	1	1	1	3	0		6	2599

== 2024 ==
=== Classical tournament ===
In parallel with the open tournament, an inaugural women-only version was held, with an equal prize fund given for the open and women's tournament. A classical win was worth 3 points and a loss 0 points. If the classical game was drawn, an armageddon game (white with 10 minutes, black with 7 minutes and draw odds) was played, with the same colours as the classical game. The player who won the armageddon game received 1½ points and the loser 1 point. The open section of the tournament was won by Magnus Carlsen, while Ju Wenjun won the women's section of the event.

==== Open Section ====
12th Norway Chess, 29 May – 7 June 2024, Stavanger, Norway, Category XXII (2779)
	Player	Rating	1	2	3	4	5	6	Points
1	Magnus Carlsen (Norway)	2830		1½ 1	0 1½	3 1½	3 1½	1½ 3	17½
2	Hikaru Nakamura (United States)	2794	1 1½		3 1	1½ 1	1½ 1	3 1	15½
3	R Praggnanandhaa (India)	2747	3 1	0 1½		1½ 1	3 1	1 1½	14½
4	Alireza Firouzja (France)	2737	0 1	1 1½	1½ 1		1½ 1½	3 1½	13½
5	Fabiano Caruana (United States)	2805	0 1	1 1½	0 1½	1 1		3 1½	11½
6	Ding Liren (China)	2762	1 0	0 1½	1½ 1	0 1	0 1		7

==== Women's Section ====
1st Norway Chess Women, 29 May – 7 June 2024, Stavanger, Norway, Category IX (2466)
	Player	Rating	1	2	3	4	5	6	Points
1	Ju Wenjun (China)	2559		1½ 1	3 1½	1½ 3	1½ 1½	3 1½	19
2	Anna Muzychuk (Ukraine)	2505	1½ 1		1 1½	1 1	1½ 3	3 1½	16
3	Lei Tingjie (China)	2548	1 0	1 1½		3 1	3 1	1½ 1½	14½
4	Vaishali Rameshbabu (India)	2489	0 1	1½ 1½	1½ 0		3 0	1 3	12½
5	Koneru Humpy (India)	2545	1 1	0 1	1½ 0	3 0		1 1½	10
6	Pia Cramling (Sweden)	2449	1 0	1 0	1 1	1 1½	0 1½		8

== 2025 ==
=== Open Section ===
13th Norway Chess, 26 May – 6 June 2025, Stavanger, Norway, Category XXII (2790.7)
	Player	Rating	1	2	3	4	5	6	Points	Circuit
1	Magnus Carlsen (Norway)	2837		3 1½	3 0	1½ 1	3 1	1 1	16	28.78
2	Fabiano Caruana (United States)	2776	1 0		3 1	0 1½	3 0	3 3	15½	20.93
3	Gukesh Dommaraju (India)	2787	3 0	1½ 0		3 0	3 0	3 1	14½	
4	Hikaru Nakamura (United States)	2804	1½ 1	1 3	3 0		1½ 1	1 1	14	
5	Arjun Erigaisi (India)	2782	1½ 0	3 0	3 0	1 1½		1½ 1½	13	
6	Wei Yi (China)	2758	1½ 1½	0 0	1½ 0	1½ 1½	1 1		9½	

=== Women's Section ===
2nd Norway Chess Women, 26 May – 6 June 2025, Stavanger, Norway, Category XI (2520.8)
	Player	Rating	1	2	3	4	5	6	Points
1	Anna Muzychuk (Ukraine)	2526		1½ 1½	3 1½	1 3	1 1	1½ 1½	16½
2	Lei Tingjie (China)	2552	1 1		3 1	1½ 1	3 1½	0 3	16
3	Koneru Humpy (India)	2543	1 0	1½ 0		1½ 1	3 1	3 3	15
4	Ju Wenjun (China)	2580	0 1½	1½ 1	1½ 1		1½ 1	3 1½	13½
5	Vaishali Rameshbabu (India)	2475	1½ 1½	1 0	1½ 0	1½ 1		0 3	11
6	Sarasadat Khademalsharieh (Spain)	2449	1 1	0 3	0 0	1 0	0 3		9

== 2026 ==
=== Open Section ===
14th Norway Chess, 25 May – 5 June 2026, Oslo, Norway, Category XXI (2762.8)
	Player	Rating	1	2	3	4	5	6	Points	Circuit
1	R Praggnanandhaa (India)	2733		1½ 0	3 0	3 3	3 1½	0 3	18	26.02
2	Wesley So (United States)	2754	3 1		1½ 1½	1½ 3	1½ 1½	1½ 1	17	18.92
3	Alireza Firouzja (France)	2759	3 0	1 1		3 0	1½ 1½	3 1½	15½	
4	Magnus Carlsen (Norway)	2840	0 0	0 1	3 0		1½ 1½	3 3	13	
5	Vincent Keymer (Germany)	2759	1 0	1 1	1 1	1 1		3 1	11	
6	Gukesh Dommaraju (India)	2732	0 3	1½ 1	1 0	0 0	1½ 0		8	

=== Women's Section ===
3rd Norway Chess Women, 25 May – 5 June 2026, Oslo, Norway, Category XII (2531.5)
	Player	Rating	1	2	3	4	5	6	Points	Circuit
1	Bibisara Assaubayeva (Kazakhstan)	2527		3 1½	1 1	1½ 0	1 3	1½ 3	16½	29.70
2	Zhu Jiner (China)	2546	1 0		1½ 1½	3 1½	0 3	3 1½	16	21.60
3	Anna Muzychuk (Ukraine)	2522	1½ 1½	1 1		1½ 1½	3 1½	1 1½	15	
4	Ju Wenjun (China)	2559	3 1	1 0	1 1		1 3	1 1½	13½	
5	Divya Deshmukh (India)	2500	0 1½	0 3	1 0	0 1½		1½ 1½	10	
6	Koneru Humpy (India)	2535	0 1	1 0	1 1½	1 1½	1 1		9	
