= Altibox =

Norwegian telecommunications service provider

- Formerly: Lyse Tele
- Type: Aksjeselskap
- Industry: Telecommunications
- Founded: May 30, 2002; 24 years ago in Stavanger, Norway
- Areas served: Norway and Denmark
- Services: Broadband; IPTV; VoIP
- Parent: Lyse AS
- Website: altibox.no (Norway) altibox.dk (Denmark)

Altibox is a unified brand name for Broadband, IPTV and VoIP services distributed in Norway and Denmark with over 35 local Norwegian and 6 Danish FTTH networks. Altibox was set up by Southwestern Norwegian multi-utility firm Lyse AS in 2002 under the name Lyse Tele. The company subsequently changed its name to Altibox in 2009.

The vast majority of Altibox customers self-install (over 80 percent).

In 2016, Altibox became the sponsor and namesake of the Altibox Norway Chess Tournament, an annual event that has been called the strongest chess tournament in the world.

In December 2019, the company announced that it had bought all the shares in Skagenfiber, a provider of subsea cables from Norway to Denmark and Norway to Newcastle (UK).
