= Flor og Fjære =

Gardens in Norway

Coordinates: 59°3′8.57″N 5°49′23.18″E

Flor og Fjære is a collection of man-made tropical gardens on the island of Sør-Hidle outside of Stavanger, Norway. The gardens and restaurant opened to the public in 1995, hosting two tours per day during their season from the beginning of May until the end of September. In 2013, Flor og Fjære hosted close to 35,000 guests during its five-month season. The island has hosted many business retreats and events such as the Norwegian Chess Tournament in 2015. The island was also visited by all three Nordic Royal Houses. Queen Sonja of Norway celebrated her 70th birthday on the island.

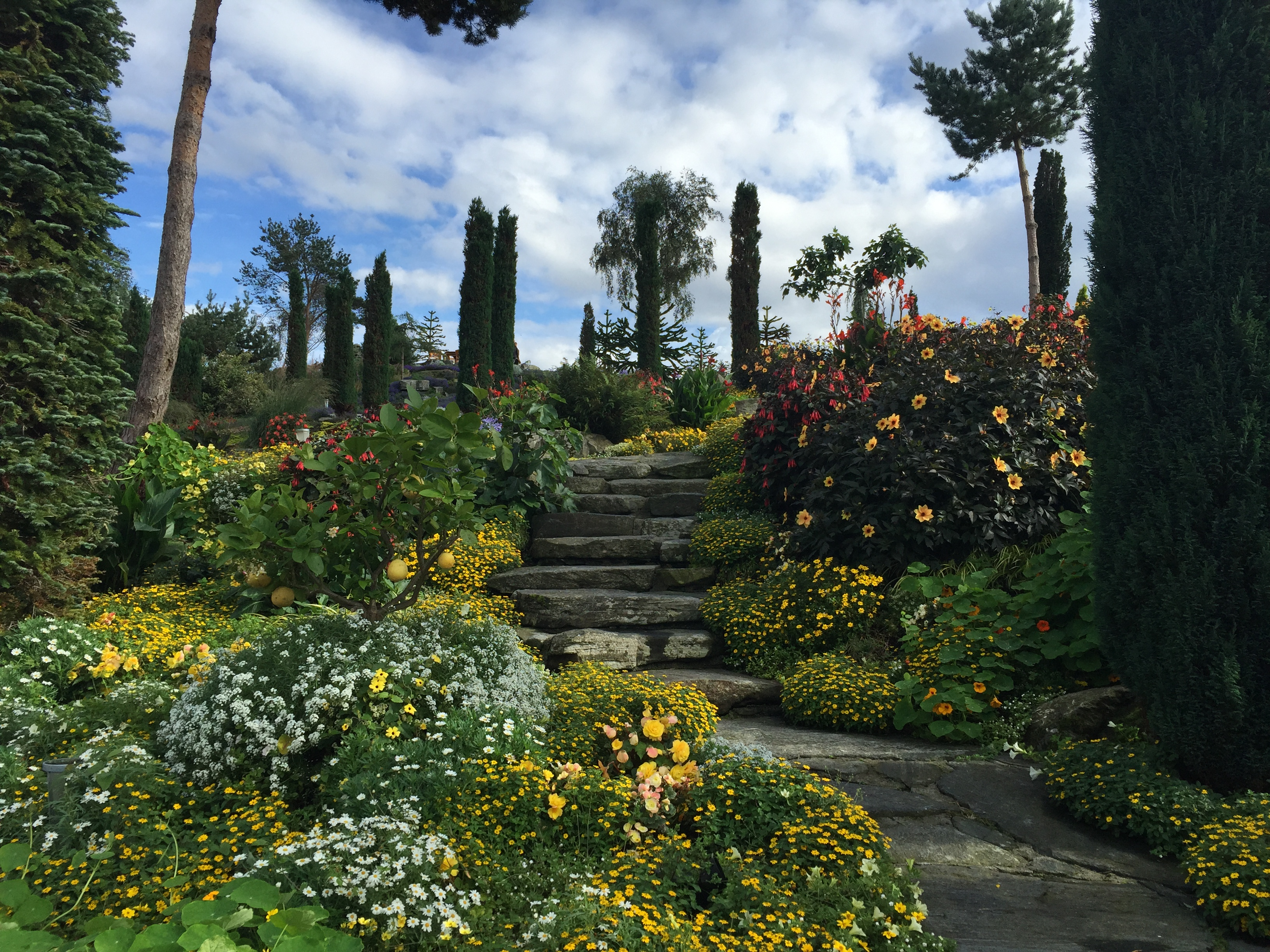
Stairs in the gardens

== History ==
In 1965, the founders, Aasmund and Else Marie Bryn, bought a farmstead on the northern tip of the island and by 1995 their son Olav Bryn opened the family retreat to the public for garden tours along with a restaurant. Aasmund moved to the island due to poor health conditions and as his health improved, he started the garden. Aasmund planted pine trees around the property line of the garden to protect his plants from the wind common to the fjords in this region.

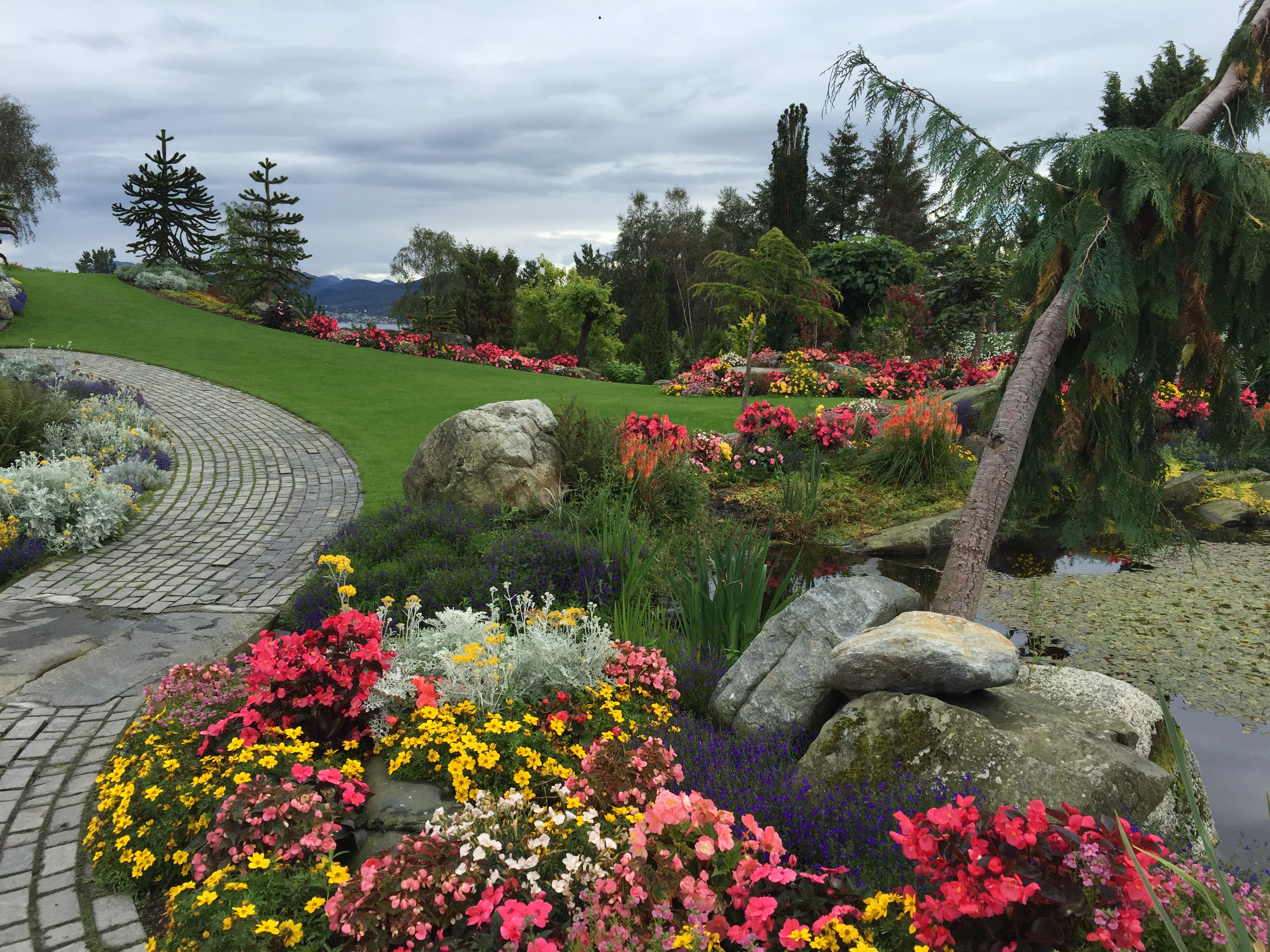
Winding path in the rose garden

== Present ==
Today, the island is visited by over 30,000 guests each year and functions as a popular tourist site, complete with a garden tour and lunch/dinner in the on-island restaurant. The island is currently run by Aasmund's son, Olav Bryn, who plants and redesigns the garden every year. He continually tests new plants to see if they will adapt to the northern climate. Bryn also tests different arrangements. Gardens on the island range from roses to cacti and each garden contains exotic plants from all over the world. After touring the gardens, guests eat at the restaurant on the island with a rotating buffet prepared by their chef, Andre Mulder.

Flor og Fjære is open to the public Monday through Saturday during their season starting at the beginning of May until the end of September. Tours are offered twice per day, one at lunch and one at dinner.

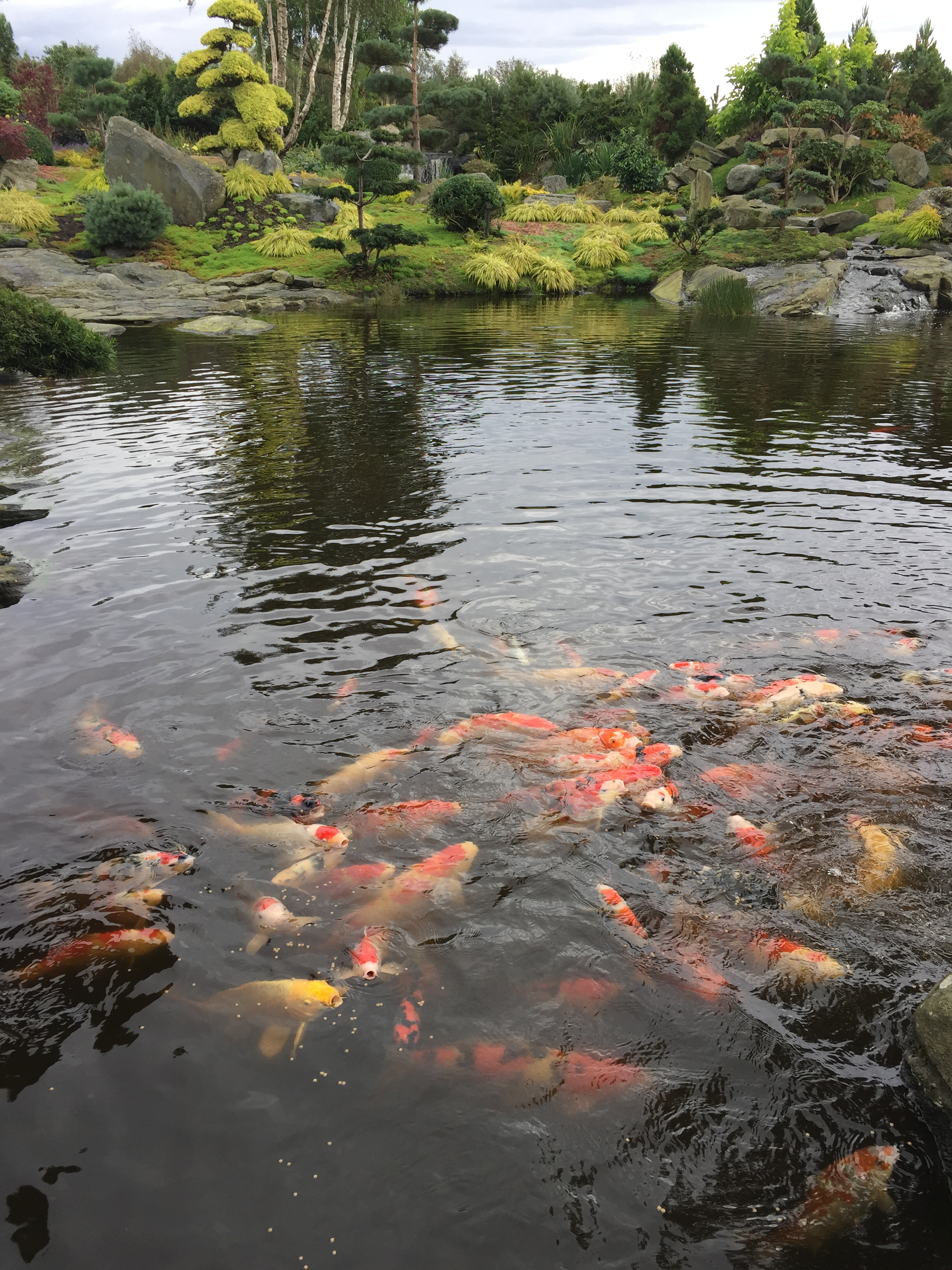
Tropical Koi Pond

== Future ==
In the coming years, the management of the gardens hopes to extend its property line on the island in order to start a farm that would be used to stock their on-island restaurant. Management believes this would increase tourism to the area.
