= Anna Muzychuk =

Ukrainian chess grandmaster (born 1990)

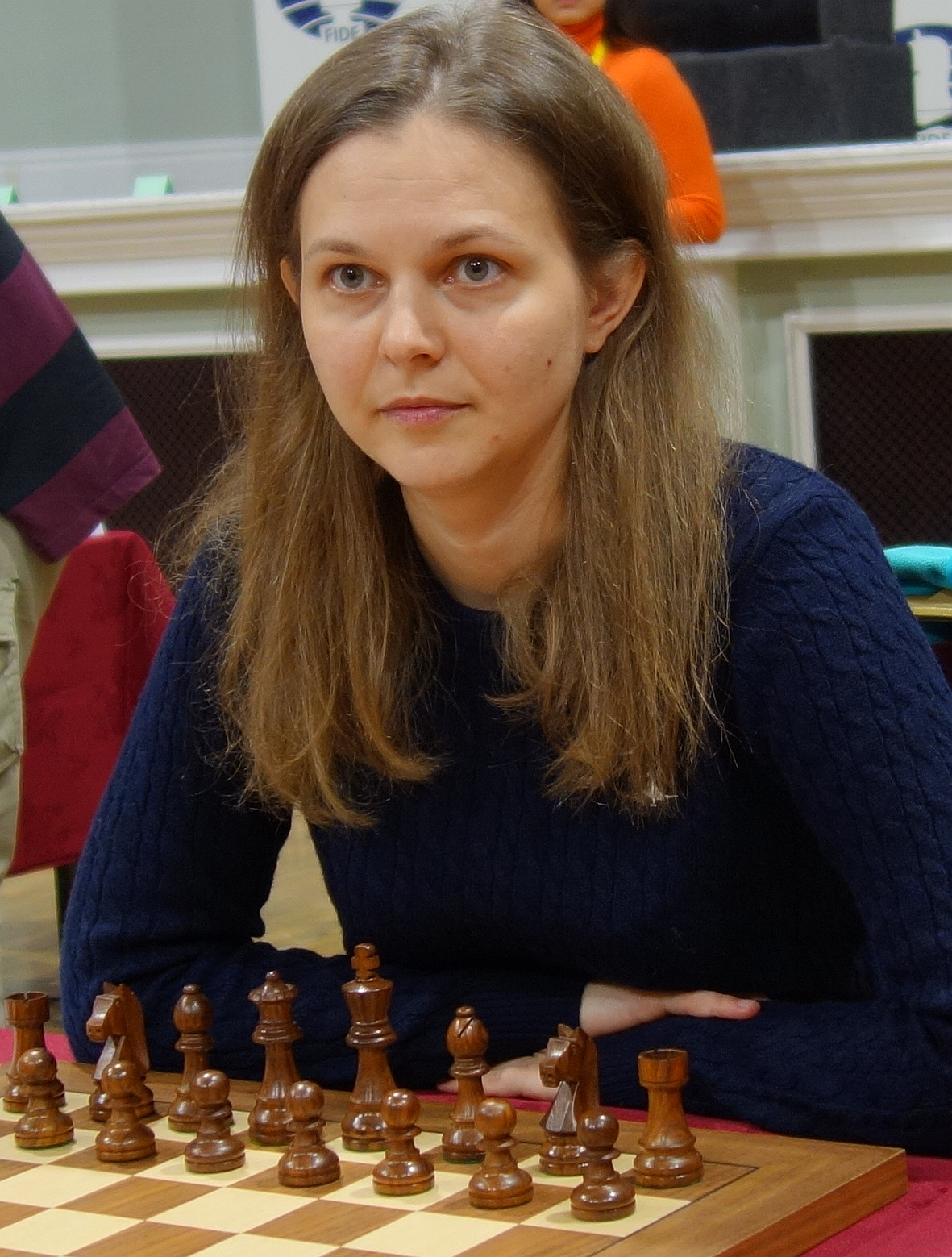
- Muzychuk in 2023

Personal information
- Born: Anna Olehivna Muzychuk; 28 February 1990 (age 36) Lviv, Ukrainian SSR, Soviet Union
- Relative: Mariya Muzychuk (sister)

Chess career
- Country: Ukraine (until 2004; since 2014); Slovenia (2004–2014)
- Title: Grandmaster (2012)
- FIDE rating: 2524 (October 2026)
- Peak rating: 2606 (July 2012)
- Peak ranking: No. 197 (August 2012); No. 2 woman (August 2012)

Anna Olehivna Muzychuk (Ukrainian: Анн́а Оле́гівна Музичу́к; Slovene: Ana Olehivna Muzičuk; born 28 February 1990) is a Ukrainian chess grandmaster (GM). She is the fourth woman in chess history to attain a FIDE rating of at least 2600. She has been ranked as high as No. 197 in the world, and No. 2 among women. Muzychuk is a three-time world champion in fast chess, having won the Women's World Rapid Chess Championship once in 2016 and the Women's World Blitz Chess Championship twice in 2014 and 2016. In classical chess, she was the 2017 Women's World Championship runner-up.

Muzychuk grew up in a chess family where her younger sister Mariya (the 2015 Women's World Champion in classical chess) also became a Grandmaster. Her parents work as chess coaches, having taught her the game from when she was two years old. She soon established herself as a chess prodigy, first winning the European Youth Chess Championships at age six in the under-8 girls' category and later winning the under-10, under-12, and under-14 girls' divisions as well. She also won the World Youth Championship in the under-16 girls' category and the World Junior Championship for under-20 girls. She earned the International Master (IM) title at age 17 and the Grandmaster title at age 21.

From 2004 to 2014, Muzychuk represented Slovenia due to conflicts with the Ukrainian Chess Federation. She won an individual gold medal at the European Women's Team Chess Championship for Slovenia in 2011 and later won an individual gold medal at the Women's Chess Olympiad in 2016 after she switched federations back to Ukraine. At the former event, she had one of the best performances of her career with a score of 8½ out of 9 and a performance rating of 2782, also earning her final GM norm. Along with Susan Polgar and Magnus Carlsen, she is one of three players to win the World Rapid and World Blitz Championships in the same year, which she achieved in 2016. She became Norway Chess Women’s Champion in 2025.

== Early life and background ==
Anna Muzychuk was born on 28 February 1990 in Lviv to Nataliya and Oleh Muzychuk. She grew up with her sister Mariya, who is two years younger, in the nearby smaller city of Stryi. Anna and Mariya both learned to play chess at age two from their parents, both of whom are professional chess coaches who studied coaching at the Lviv State Institute of Physical Culture sports school and have since worked and taught at the school. Their father originally taught them how the pieces move at a park where there was a large human-sized chess board on the ground. Anna began competing at chess at age five, finishing in second place at both her school chess tournament and the under-10 girls' division of the Lviv regional championship. By the time she was ten years old, she could defeat both of her parents. When Muzychuk was about 14 years old, she had been coached by Roman Kozel for two years. She was still attending school at Stryi Gymnasium at the time, but later stopped attending regularly. Around this time, she also briefly worked with Orest Gritsak, a Ukrainian Grandmaster (GM) who had coached top Ukrainian player Vasyl Ivanchuk. She had not had much opportunity to train with Grandmasters at this point because her family could not afford this level of coaching.

At age 14, Muzychuk switched federations from Ukraine to Slovenia due to conflicts she had with the Ukrainian Chess Federation. One of the issues she had was not being put on the Ukrainian national team or given the opportunity to compete at the Women's Chess Olympiad despite winning the Ukrainian Women's Chess Championship at age 13. Around the same time, Boris Kutin, a Slovenian who was the president of the European Chess Union, offered Muzychuk the opportunity to represent Slovenia, which she accepted. Although she played for Slovenia for the next ten years, she remained based in Ukraine.

== Chess career ==
=== 1996–2004: Six-time European Youth champion ===
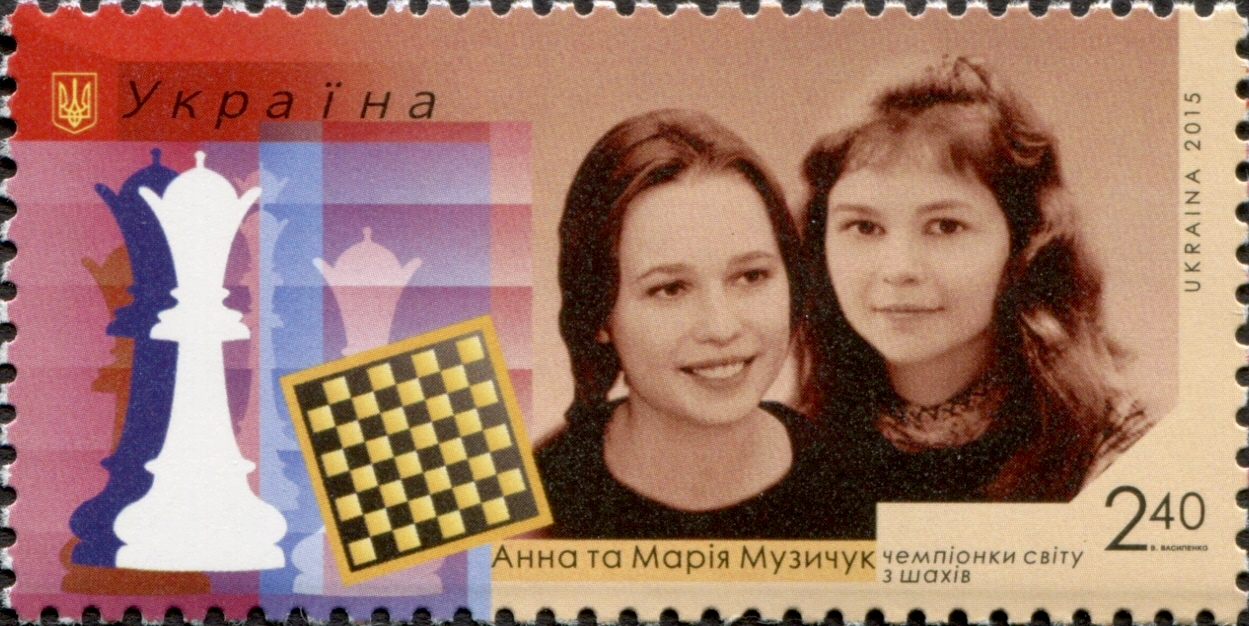
2015 Ukrainian postage stamp featuring Anna (right) and Mariya Muzychuk as children

Muzychuk had a long stretch of success at the European Youth Chess Championships, medalling in nine consecutive years from 1996 at age six to 2004 at age fourteen, including six gold medals. She won the under-8 girls' division in 1996, the under-10 girls' division twice in 1998 and 2000, the under-12 girls' division in 2002, and the under-14 girls' division twice in 2003 and 2004. She won three silver medals at the tournament, two in the under-10 girls' division in 1997 and 1999 behind Nana Dzagnidze and Silvia-Raluca Sgîrcea respectively, and one in the under-12 girls' division in 2001 behind Iozefina Păuleţ. At the national level, Muzychuk won the Ukrainian girls' national youth and junior championships three times, once each at the under-10 level in 2000, the under-12 level in 2002, and the under-20 level in 2004. Between those last two medals, she was the overall national women's champion in 2003. On the global stage, Muzychuk also medalled in the girls' divisions of the World Youth Championships, earning a bronze medal at the under-10 level in 2000 behind Tan Zhongyi and Harika Dronavalli, as well as two silver medals, one at the under-12 level in 2002 behind Tan and another at the under-14 level in 2004 behind Dronavalli.

Muzychuk was awarded the titles of Woman FIDE Master (WFM) in 2001 and Woman International Master (WIM) in 2002. She earned her first FIDE rating of 2197 in July 2001 at age 11. She first participated at the European Individual Women's Championship in 2002 at age 12, and finished with at least an even score in her first three appearances through 2004. Her performance at the 2003 edition as well as a joint first-place finish at the 17-round Lviv's Hopes tournament later in the year helped Muzychuk reach a rating of 2300 by October 2003. She also earned a sufficient number of Woman Grandmaster (WGM) norms at these two tournaments, and was formally awarded the WGM title in 2004. At the end of June 2004, Muzychuk switched federations to Slovenia. Her 2004 European Youth gold and World Youth silver medals were among her earliest triumphs with Slovenia.

=== 2005–2010: World Youth and World Junior champion, International Master ===
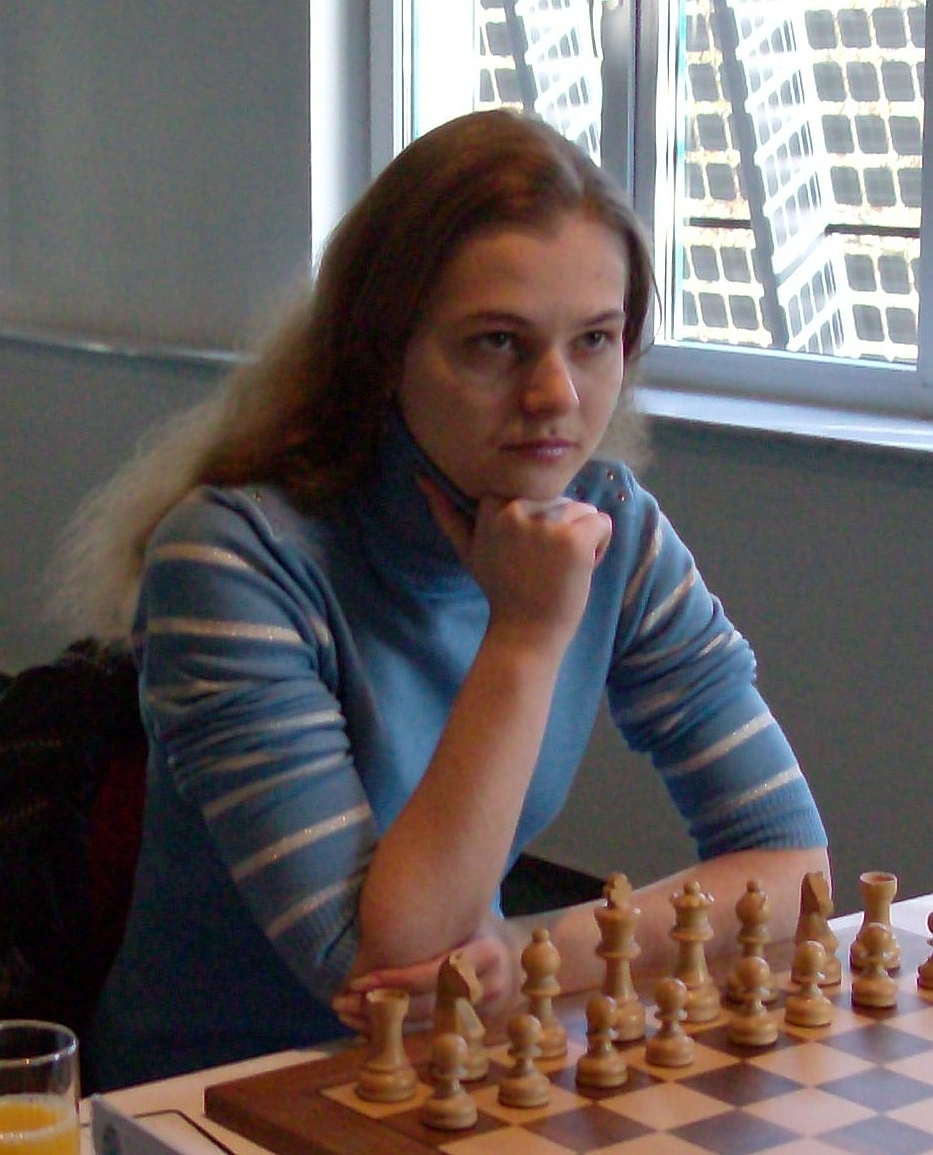
Muzychuk in 2009

Following her many titles at the European Youth Championships, Muzychuk finally won a gold medal at the World Youth Championships in 2005 in the under-16 girls' division. She finished in clear first with an unbeaten score of 9/11, (Note: 9 points in 11 games. (A win is 1 point, a draw is a ½ point, and a loss is 0 points.)) drawing with Dronavalli in the last round to clinch the title. She then had a significant rise in rating towards the end of the year to reach a rating of 2400 for January 2006. This rise predominantly resulted from good performances at the Instalplast tournament in Lviv where she had a positive score of 5½/8 against higher-rated opposition and the Slovenian Women's League where she had a dominant score of 8/9.

Having already reached a rating of 2400, Muzychuk earned all of her International Master (IM) norms in 2006 and 2007, the first two of which as a double norm at the Women's Chess Olympiad in Turin and the last of which in the Serbian Women's League. She was awarded the IM title in 2007. One of her other best results in classical chess during these years was at the 2006 European Individual Women's Championship, where she scored 7½/11 and finished in equal third place. In fast chess, Muzychuk won the 2007 European Women's Blitz Chess Championship and finished second in the European Women's Rapid Chess Championship.

Muzychuk first participated in the Women's World Chess Championship knockout tournament in 2008. As the 11th seed out of 64 competitors, she won her first round match against Maria Velcheva before being upset by 22nd seed Dronavalli in the second round in rapid tiebreaks. Over the next two years, Muzychuk first reached a rating of 2500 and then earned her first two GM norms. The first was a seven-game norm at the European Club Cup for Women in 2008. The second was a full nine-round norm at the InventiChess round robin tournament in 2009, where she had an even score against opponents with a much higher average rating of 2618, including six Grandmasters rated above 2600. During the latter event, she defeated David Howell, a GM rated 2624. She came close to another GM norm in Group B at the round robin Corus chess tournament in Wijk aan Zee in 2010, but fell just short with a performance rating of 2580 by virtue of scoring 5½/13 against opponents with average rating of 2637. Although she could not complete the norm, she was the only player to defeat the winner of the tournament, Anish Giri. That summer, Muzychuk had her biggest triumph of the year by winning the World Junior Chess Championship for under-20 girls in Chotowa, Poland, finishing in clear first with a score of 11/13. She ended 2010 by reaching the third round of the Women's World Chess Championship, where as the 7th seed she was upset by 10th seed Ju Wenjun.

=== 2011–2012: Grandmaster title at age 21, 2600 rating ===
Muzychuk completed the requirements for the Grandmaster title in 2011 with her third and fourth GM norms to reach the 27-game norm minimum needed. She earned a nine-game norm in the opening event of the 2011–12 FIDE Women's Grand Prix in Rostov with a score of 5½/9, narrowly missing a norm over the full 11 games that would have been sufficient for reaching the 27-game minimum. She reached that minimum with her fourth GM norm at the European Women's Team Chess Championships, where she scored a near-perfect 8½/9, including 6½/7 against her seven highest-rated opponents to complete the norm and earn the Grandmaster title at age 21. With this performance, her rating also rose to 2580.

Muzychuk continued to excel in 2012, reaching a career-best rating of 2606 in the middle of the year. She produced her career-best result at the European Individual Women's Championship, scoring 8½/11 and earning a bronze medal. She had an opportunity to win the tournament with a last-round draw, but lost to Valentina Gunina. As a result, she only finished in joint first and lost to Gunina and Tatiana Kosintseva on the head-to-head tiebreak criteria. Muzychuk continued to perform well in the Grand Prix, finishing in joint first with Koneru Humpy at the Kazan event. During the event, she became the fourth woman to reach a rating of 2600 after Judit Polgár, Koneru, and Hou Yifan. Following the tournament, she reached a career-best ranking of No. 197 in the world in August and also became the second-highest-rated woman for the first time, only behind Polgár. Nonetheless, in the final standings for the overall Grand Prix, Muzychuk finished in third place behind Koneru and the winner Hou, losing out on the winner's right to challenge for the Women's World Championship. Later in the year, Muzychuk took part in the unrated ACP Golden Classic classical tournament in Amsterdam that followed an unusual format where games were adjourned if not completed in 40 moves. (Note: This format of adjournments had long been abandoned in chess in part due to the capabilities of computers to analyze in-progress games.) She finished with an even score, and notably defeated Krishnan Sasikiran, a Grandmaster rated 2707 at the time. At the end of the year, Muzychuk was the 3rd seed at the Women's World Chess Championship, but was upset in the second round by the 30th seed and eventual winner Anna Ushenina in rapid tiebreaks.

=== 2013–2016: World Rapid and World Blitz champion ===
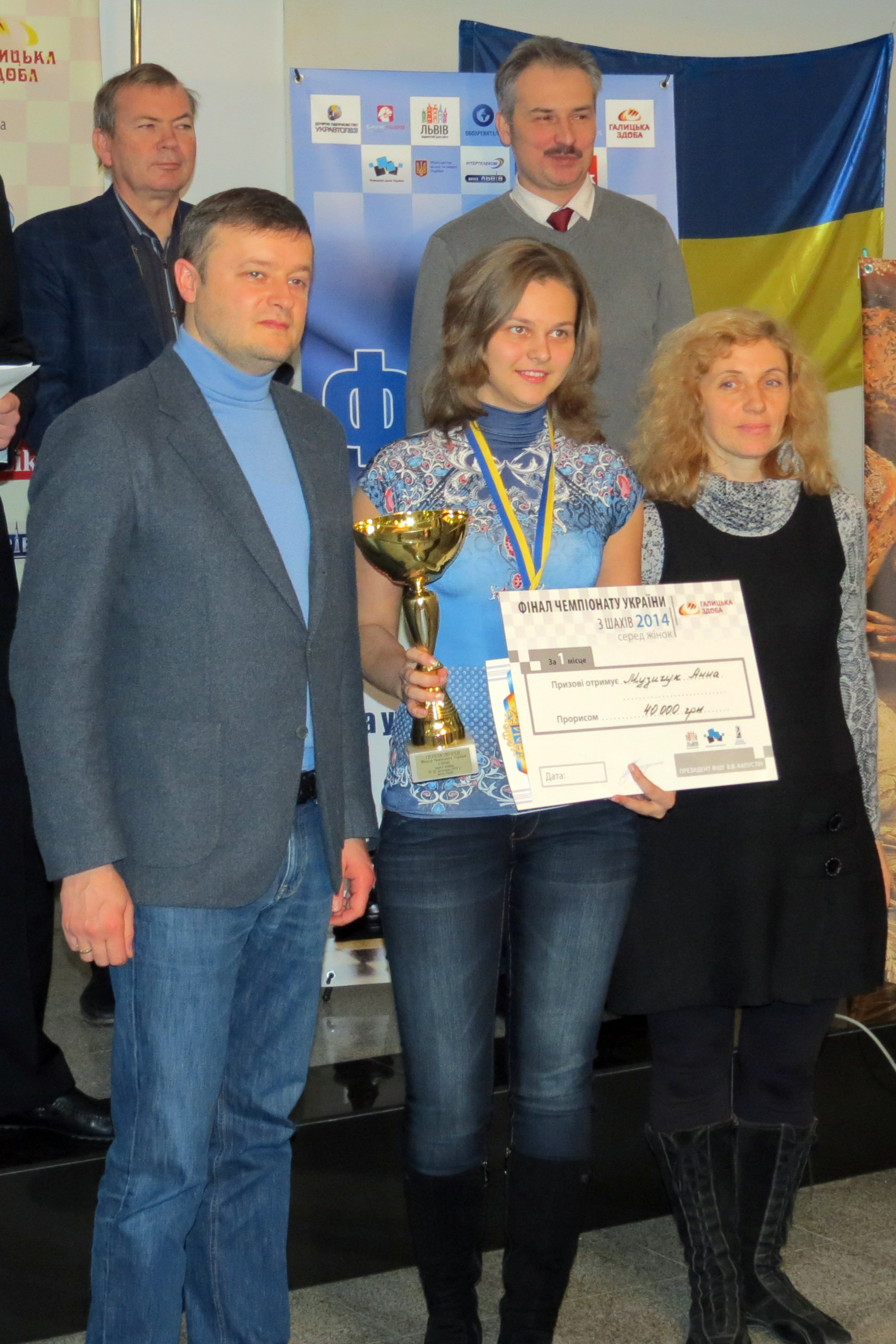
Muzychuk with the winner's prizes at the 2014 Ukrainian women's national championship, where she was making a comeback appearance

Muzychuk again generally finished towards the top of the standings in the 2013–14 FIDE Women's Grand Prix events, but did not win any of them and ultimately finished fourth in the overall standings. She had a better result at the Tata Steel Challengers tournament in Wijk aan Zee in early 2014, where she came in fourth place with a score of 8/13, corresponding to a performance rating of 2666. With this performance, her rating rose back to 2583. After the tournament, however, her rating fell back into the mid-2500s and would not reach 2570 again until 2017 three years later. Although her performance in classical chess was in the midst of a mild decline, Muzychuk had a major result in fast chess, winning the Women's World Blitz Championship in April. She won the tournament by a wide margin, finishing with 23/30, 2½ points ahead of Dzagnidze in second place. The championship brought her blitz rating to a career-best 2665. She had also finished in joint third place at the preceding Women's World Rapid Championship event. The World Blitz victory was her last major triumph with Slovenia. In May 2014, Muzychuk switched federations again back to her home country of Ukraine. She stated her sister continuing to play for Ukraine as well as the new federation president Viktor Kapustin as reasons for her return. At the end of the year, she entered the Ukrainian women's national championship for the first time since she was the 2003 champion and again won the tournament.

Muzychuk was less active in 2015. One of her highlights of the year was the Women's World Championship, where she had her best result to date. As the third seed, she reached the quarterfinals. She knocked out 62nd seed Amina Mezioud, 30th seed Aleksandra Goryachkina, and 19th seed Lela Javakhishvili without any tiebreaks before being upset by 11th seed Pia Cramling in the second set of rapid tiebreaks. The tournament was ultimately won by her sister Mariya, whom she stayed to support. Early in 2016, Muzychuk won the women's first prize at the Gibraltar Chess Festival with a score of 7/10, corresponding to a performance rating of 2677. During the tournament, she defeated two Grandmasters rated above 2600, Salem Saleh and Laurent Fressinet, the latter of whom was rated 2700 and is the only player she has defeated in a rated classical game with a rating of at least 2700. At the end of 2016, Muzychuk won both the Women's World Rapid Championship and the Women's World Blitz Championship in Doha, thereby also defending the latter of these two titles from 2014. She became the third player to win both events in the same year after Susan Polgar in 1992 and Magnus Carlsen in 2014. She won the rapid event by a full point over Aleksandra Kosteniuk and the blitz event by a ½ point ahead of Gunina and Kateryna Lagno.

=== 2017–2018: World Championship runner-up ===
Muzychuk came closest to winning the classical Women's World Chess Championship in 2017 in Tehran, where she finished runner-up to Tan Zhongyi. As the 2nd seed, she reached the final without needing tiebreaks, notably defeating 34th seed Alina Kashlinskaya, 7th seed Antoaneta Stefanova, and 3rd seed Alexandra Kosteniuk. Unlike the other matches which were best-of-two classical games, the final match against the 9th seed Tan was played as a best-of-four classical games. After Muzychuk lost the second game with the black pieces, she won the third game with the white pieces, sending the match to tiebreaks as the other two games ended in draws. Tan won the second game of the rapid tiebreaks to clinch the title.

At the end of 2017, Muzychuk gained widespread media attention for her decision to boycott the World Rapid and Blitz Championships in Saudi Arabia and forgo the opportunity to defend both of her World Championship titles because of Saudi Arabia's restrictions against women, including those related to women's clothing and the prohibition on women going outside without being accompanied by a man. She refused to attend despite the tournament having a prize fund five times higher than the previous edition. She commented:

In a few days I am going to lose two World Champion titles – one by one. Just because I decided not to go to Saudi Arabia. Not to play by someone's rules, not to wear abaya, not to be accompanied getting outside, and altogether not to feel myself a secondary creature. Exactly one year ago I won these two titles and was about the happiest person in the chess world but this time I feel really bad. I am ready to stand for my principles and skip the event, where in five days I was expected to earn more than I do in a dozen of events combined. All that is annoying, but the most upsetting thing is that almost nobody really cares. That is a really bitter feeling, still not the one to change my opinion and my principles. The same goes for my sister Mariya – and I am really happy that we share this point of view.

Her announcement of the preceding comments on Facebook was shared over 74,000 times and received over 165,000 reactions predominantly in support of her statement. Her decision was also influenced by her feelings about having already competed at the Women's World Championship in Iran earlier in the year where there were similar restrictions on clothing requiring women to wear headscarves. Having had that experience, she did not want to participate in the tournament in Saudi Arabia because she viewed her participation as supporting a society that has discriminating policies against women. The following year in 2018, Saudi Arabia was scheduled to host the tournament again; however, it was moved to Russia less than a month in advance largely due to a separate issue of Israeli players being denied visas needed to compete. Muzychuk returned to the tournament and fared better in the rapid event than the blitz event, finishing in fourth place.

For the second consecutive Women's World Championship knockout tournament, Muzychuk faced Stefanova and Kosteniuk in back-to-back rounds, this time as the 4th seed in 2018. Although she once again defeated the 13th seed Stefanova, she then lost to the 5th seed Kosteniuk in the quarterfinals in rapid tiebreaks.

=== 2019–present: Three Candidates tournaments ===
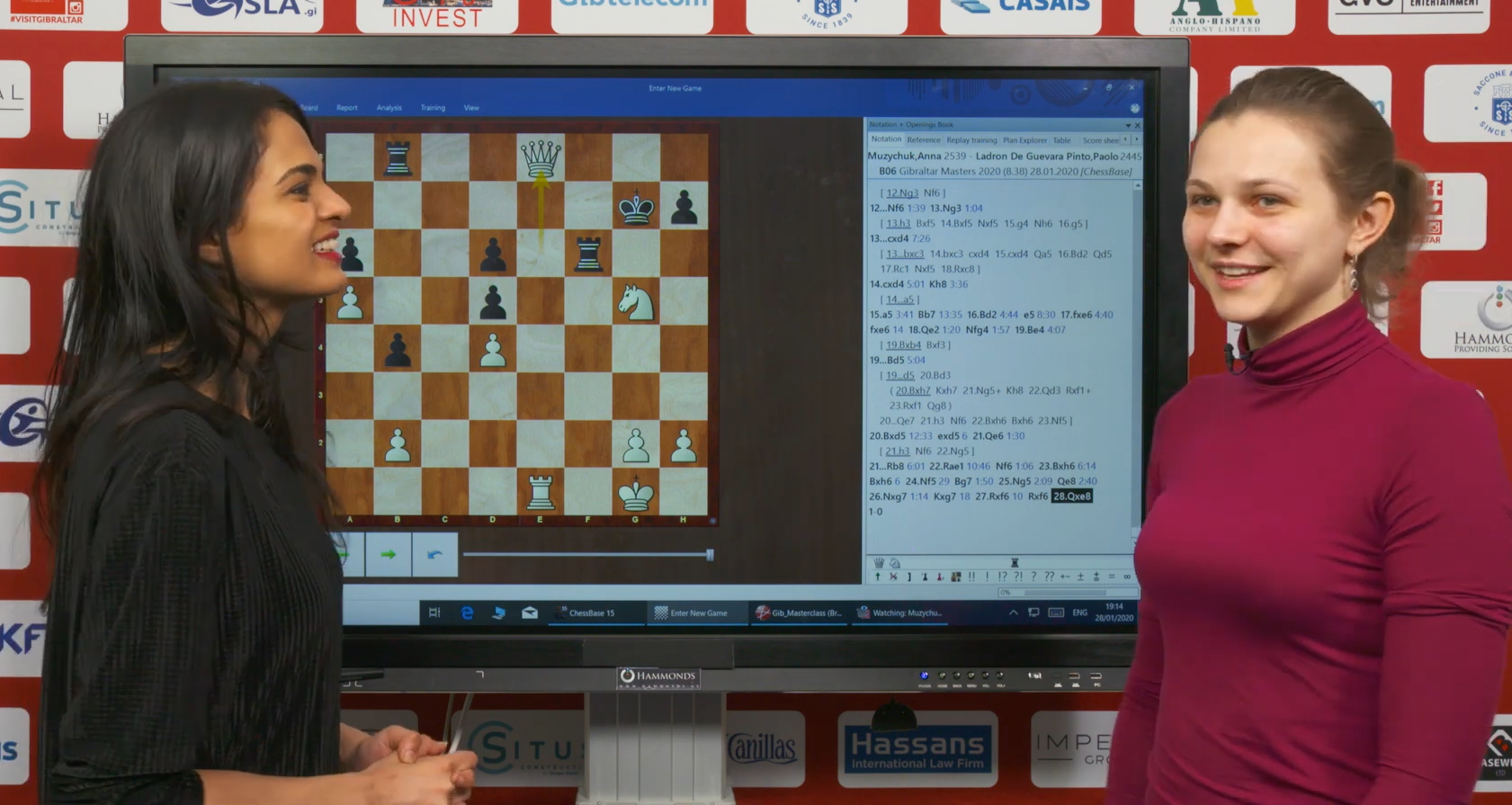
Muzychuk (right) talking to Tania Sachdev at the 2020 Gibraltar Chess Festival

After the 2018 World Championship, the Women's World Championship switched to a match format where the reigning champion would defend their title against the winner of an eight-player double round-robin Candidates tournament, the first of which would take place in 2019. Muzychuk was one of the players who qualified for the Candidates tournament by rating. Although she had a strong finish, she could not overcome a slow start where she lost two of the first three games to Dzagnidze and Tan, and her final score of 8/14 only sufficed for second place. At the end of 2019, Muzychuk won a third medal at the World Blitz Championship, earning the silver medal a ½ point behind only Lagno.

Muzychuk began 2020 at the Gibraltar Chess Festival. Although she did not win the women's prize, she was awarded the overall tournament brilliancy prize for her last-round game against Ori Kobo, an Israeli Grandmaster. At the 2019–21 FIDE Women's Grand Prix, the format was changed to have the top three players qualify for the next Candidates tournament in 2022 instead of just one player qualifying for a world championship match. Nonetheless, Muzychuk did not win any of the events and was unable to secure one of these spots. She was still able to qualify for the Candidates tournament by reaching the semifinals of the inaugural Women's World Cup in 2021, a tournament that replaced the World Championship knockout events. As the 4th seed, she defeated 20th seed Elisabeth Pähtz and 5th seed Dzagnidze among others before losing to 1st seed Aleksandra Goryachkina in the penultimate round. Although she also lost the third place match to 7th seed Tan, she still earned one of three Candidates spots awarded through the World Cup by virtue of Goryachkina having already qualified as the previous World Championship runner-up. Muzychuk ended the year at the World Rapid and Blitz Championships. She finished in the top 15 at both events but was not in contention to medal by the later rounds.

In 2024 Muzychuk participated in Candidates Tournament, finishing 8th.

Muzychuk finished 3rd in overall standings of the FIDE Women's Grand Prix 2024–25 with a tie for first with Zhu Jiner in both Stage 4 Cyprus and Stage 6 Austria.

In 2025 Muzychuk won the Women's section of Norway Chess 2025, winning two Classical games and not losing any classical game being the only undefeated player of the tournament.

Muzychuk won the Silver Medal at the Women's World Blitz Chess Championship 2025, losing only in the finals to Bibisara Assaubayeva.

She qualified for the Women's Candidates Tournament 2026 on 22nd March 2026 as Koneru Humpy withdrew the tournament citing the 2026 Iran war; Muzychuk qualified by the FIDE Women's events leaderboard 2025. Muzychuk finished 5th in the Women's Candidates Tournament 2026, she was in sole lead after 7 rounds but lost her 8th round game to Divya Deshmukh and then drew 5 of the remaining 6 games losing to Bibisara Assaubayeva in round 13, to finish with the score 7/14.

Muzychuk finished 3rd at Norway Chess 2026 Women being the only undefeated player, though she won only one game to end on 15 points.

== Team competitions ==
=== Slovenia ===
Muzychuk represented Slovenia on the top board at five consecutive Women's Chess Olympiads from 2004 to 2012. Slovenia's best result came at the 2006 Turin Olympiad, where they finished in 9th place, outperforming their seed of 17th out of 106 teams. The team scored 16 points (+7–4=2), (Note: 7 wins, 4 losses, 2 draws) and Muzychuk individually scored 8/11, earning a double IM norm. Ana Srebrnič and Jana Krivec were on the second and third boards respectively, while Ksenija Novak was on the reserve board. Muzychuk's best individual result came at the 2010 Khanty-Mansiysk Olympiad, where she scored 8/11 and finished in fifth place on the top board with a performance rating of 2547, 26 points below bronze medallist Hou Yifan's performance rating of 2573.

Muzychuk fared better for Slovenia at the European Women's Team Championships, which she took part in for four consecutive editions from 2005 through 2011. Slovenia finished in the top ten three times in those four tournaments, including in 2007 in Heraklion when they came in 6th place out of 30 teams and outperformed their 11th seed. Overall, the team scored 12 points (+5–2=2). Krivec, Srebrnič, and Vesna Rožič were on the lower boards that year, while Indira Bajt was on the reserve board. Muzychuk's best result was in 2011 in Porto Carras when she earned an individual gold medal with a near-perfect score of 8½/9, corresponding to a performance rating of 2782, 150 points ahead of Lagno who won the silver medal. This performance also earned Muzychuk her final GM norm to clinch the Grandmaster title.

=== Ukraine ===
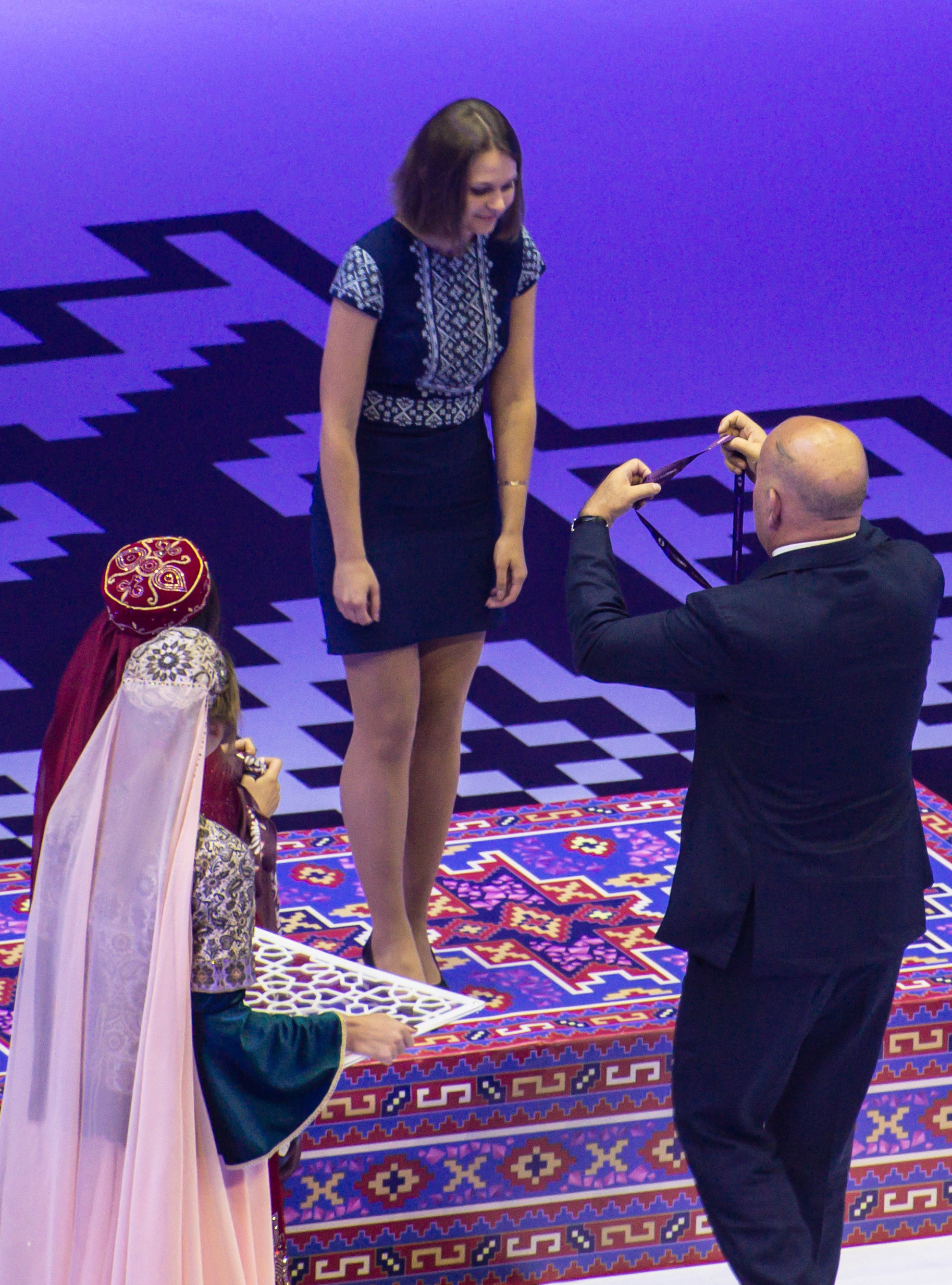
Muzychuk receiving her individual gold medal at the 2016 Women's Chess Olympiad in Baku

Since switching federations back to Ukraine, Muzychuk has played at four Women's Chess Olympiads and her team has medalled at all of them. At the 2014 Tromsø Olympiad, she played on the top board in front of her sister Mariya, Natalia Zhukova, and Anna Ushenina on the lower boards, as well Inna Gaponenko on the reserve board. As a team, they were the 3rd seed and won the bronze medal with 18 points (+8–1=2), behind Russia who had 20 points and China who also had 18 points. They were the only team to defeat Russia, but lost to the lower-rated team of Serbia. With the same players, Ukraine again won bronze at the 2016 Baku Olympiad. As the 2nd seed, they finished with 17 points (+7–1=3), behind China who again had 20 points and Poland who also had 17 points. Their only loss was to the winners China. Individually, Muzychuk won the gold medal on the top board with an unbeaten 7½/10 and a performance rating of 2629, ahead of Hou Yifan. At the 2018 Batumi Olympiad, Ukraine were again the 2nd seed, using the same team except for swapping in Iulija Osmak on the reserve board. They tied with China for first place with an unbeaten 18 points (+7–0=4), but ended up with the silver medal because of the tiebreak criteria. Muzychuk narrowly did not earn an individual medal, finishing in fourth place on the top board.

Muzychuk has represented Ukraine at two European Women's Team Championships, and her team has medalled at both of them. She played on the second board in 2015 in Reykjavik as Ukraine won the silver medal with a score of 15 points (+7–1=1). They drew the winners Russia and lost to bronze medallists Georgia. Muzychuk again played on the top board in 2017 in Hersonissos. Ukraine scored 13 points (+6–2=1) and won the bronze medal behind Russia and Georgia, the two teams who defeated them. Muzychuk won an individual silver medal with an unbeaten score of 6½/9 and a performance rating of 2621, behind only Alexandra Kosteniuk.

At Chess Olympiad 2022 in Chennai Ukraine had the 2nd highest pre-tournament rating behind India, As China didn't sent their team and Russia was banned due to the Russian Invasion of Ukraine Mariya was playing board 1 instead of Anna and Nataliya Buksa replaced Natalia Zhukova on board 4, Ukraine went undefeated with 7 wins and 3 draws, Anna won the sliver medal for board 2.

=== European Club Cup ===
Muzychuk has participated in the European Women's Chess Club Cup since 2006. She started out playing for AVS Krasnoturinsk, winning team bronze and silver medals in her two appearances as well as an individual silver in her first appearance. She switched to ŠK T-Com Podgorica in 2008 and then Ekonomist SGSEU Saratov, winning a team bronze and individual silver for the former club. From 2010 until 2018, Muzychuk played for perennial contenders CE de Monte Carlo, winning five team gold medals and four individual gold medals on her respective boards. Her teammates on CE de Monte Carlo regularly included Hou Yifan, Koneru Humpy, and Pia Cramling. In 2019, Muzychuk switched clubs to the Kyiv Chess Federation. She won both team and individual silver medals in 2019 and then both team and individual bronze medals in 2021.

== Playing style ==
Muzychuk has a very strong preference for 1.e4 (the King's Pawn Game) with the white pieces. Although rarely used, her second-most frequent first move with the white pieces is 1.f4 (Bird's Opening). She commonly defends against 1.e4 with the Sicilian defence (1.e4 c5) and commonly defends against 1.d4 with the Dutch defence (1.d4 f5). Muzychuk has described her playing style as similar to that of Fabiano Caruana in that they both focus on preparing openings and are good at positional chess. She considers herself an active player.

== Personal life ==
Muzychuk and former world champion Viswanathan Anand co-hosted the official commentary for the 2021 World Chess Championship match between Magnus Carlsen and Ian Nepomniachtchi. Muzychuk was replacing Almira Skripchenko, who was unable to attend.

Muzychuk has a good friendly relationship with her sister, even though they regard each other as having very different personalities. Anna thinks of herself as calmer and prefers spending time with family and solitary activities such as reading or watching movies, in contrast with Mariya who is more expressive and likes shopping and doing things outside of home. All of their classical games against each other have ended in draws, while Anna has the only two wins between them in blitz format.

== Awards and honors ==
- Order of Princess Olga (3rd class)

== Notable games ==
- Anna Muzychuk (2539) – Ori Kobo (2445), 2020 Gibraltar Masters: Round 10; Sicilian defense, 1–0. Muzychuk was awarded the tournament brilliancy prize for her last-round game where she offered to sacrifice one of her bishops and her queen in the middle of the game. Tournament journalist John Saunders annotated the game below:
Muzychuk vs. Kobo, Gibraltar 2020

Position: f8 black rook, g8 black king, b7 black bishop, f7 black queen, g7 black pawn, h7 black pawn, a6 black pawn, h6 black rook, b5 black pawn, c5 black bishop, e5 white bishop, f5 black pawn, f4 white pawn, h4 white pawn, a3 white pawn, d3 white bishop, h3 white queen, b2 white pawn, c2 white pawn, c1 white king, d1 white rook, e1 white rook

Position after 20. Be5 Re6 21. Qf1 Rf8 22. Qh3 Rh6

1.e4 c5 2.Nf3 Nc6 3.Nc3 e6 4.d4 cxd4 5.Nxd4 Qc7 6.f4 a6 7.Nxc6 Qxc6 8.Bd3 b5 9.Qe2 Bb7 10.Bd2 Bc5 11.a3 Ne7 12.0‑0‑0 0‑0 13.h4 f5 14.g4 ("14.h5 has been played before, but the text has the flavour of a devil-may-care last-round punt.") 14...d5 15.gxf5 exf5 16.exd5 Nxd5 17.Nxd5 Qxd5 18.Rhe1 Qf7 ("18...Qa2 crossed my mind, threatening mate in one, but after simply 19.Bc3 the queen would be left looking silly.") 19.Bc3 Rfe8 20.Be5 Re6 21.Qf1 ("21.Kb1!? followed by c4 looks like a good plan for White.") 21...Rf8 22.Qh3 Rh6? ("Material is level and Black's pieces apparently all well-defended, but White now uncorked a stunner.") 23.Bxf5!! Qxf5 24.Rd7! Rg6 ("A queen sacrifice but capturing it is punished immediately: 24...Qxh3 25.Rxg7+ Kh8 26.Rg6+! and mate next move.") 25.Qb3+ Kh8 ("25...Rf7 is met the same way.") 26.Rxb7 ("White recaptures the sacrificed bishop for a net gain of one pawn plus a rook on the seventh.") 26...Bf2 ("A mistake as White immediately demonstrates. Black had to do something about the monster bishop on e5 with 26...Bd6? though he's still in dead trouble after 27.Qd3 Qxd3 28.cxd3 with an extra pawn, possibility of joint passed pawns if the bishops are exchanged, and h5 in the air.") 27.h5!! ("Finely calculated.") 27...Rg3 ("27...Bxe1 28.hxg6 Rg8 29.Bxg7+! Rxg7 30.Rb8+ and mates.") 28.Qd5! h6 ("The point of the sacrifice is that, after 28...Bxe1, White has 29.h6! with a winning triple attack on the g7-pawn.") 29.Re2 Rg1+ 30.Kd2 Bh4 31.Qd4 ("Threatening both Bxg7+ and the loose rook on g1, so Black hasn't time to consolidate with 31...Bf6.") 31...Rc8 32.Bxg7+ Kg8 33.Qxg1! ("It's White's turn to accept proffered material. She has to calculate carefully to ensure that her king can escape to safety after Black's forthcoming retaliatory strike on c2.") 33...Rxc2+ 34.Ke3 Qh3+ ("34...Rxe2+ 35.Kxe2 Qe4+ 36.Kd2 Qxb7 37.Bf6+ discovers check on the king and wins the bishop on f4, after which the win of the game should be relatively straightforward.") 35.Kd4 Bf2+ ("If 35...Rc4+ 36.Ke5 and, despite its exposed position in the middle of the board, the white king is safe from checks.") 36.Rxf2 Rc4+ 37.Kd5 1‑0 ("Now the black queen can give check on d3 or f5, but in either case White can interpose with her bishop, discovering an attack on the black king, with fatal consequences.")

- Ju Wenjun (2580) - Anna Muzychuk (2526), Norway Chess 2025: Round 9; English Opening 0–1. Muzychuk sacrifice an exchange on move 24, and after the mistake by Ju Wenjun on move 27 gets a winning position. This game happened to be decisive for Anna's win of the tournament as by the 8th Round she was one point behind the leader and the win gave her +3 points due to the special scoring system.
