= Sør-Hidle =

Island in Rogaland, Norway

Hidle Sør-Hidle
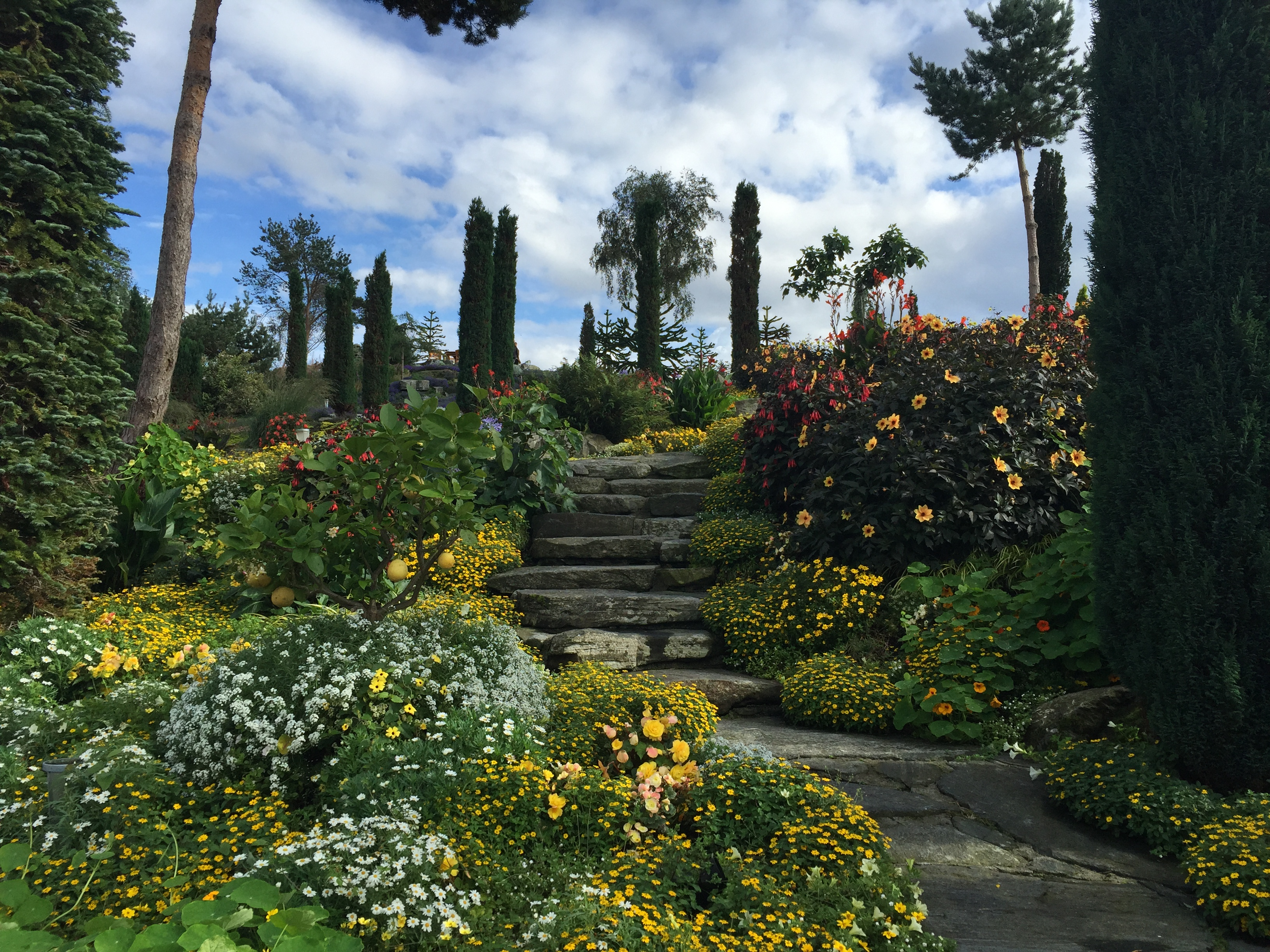
- The tropical garden at Flor og Fjære
- Interactive map of the island

Geography
- Location: Rogaland, Norway
- Coordinates: 59.04382°N 5.82658°E
- Area: 1.4 km^{2} (0.54 sq mi)
- Length: 2 km (1.2 mi)
- Width: 1.2 km (0.75 mi)
- Highest elevation: 81 m (266 ft)
- Highest point: Kråkeberg

Administration
- Norway
- County: Rogaland
- Municipality: Strand Municipality

Hidle or Sør-Hidle is an island in Strand Municipality in Rogaland county, Norway. The 1.4-square-kilometre (0.54 sq mi) island lies at the southeastern edge of a large archipelago of islands located between the Boknafjorden and the mouth of the Høgsfjorden, just to the northeast of city of Stavanger. The village of Tau lies about 5 kilometres (3.1 mi) east of the island. The island of Åmøy lies a short distance to the west of Hidle and the island of Heng lies a short distance to the southeast. The highest point on the island is the 81-metre (266 ft) tall Kråkeberget.

The new Ryfast Tunnel was constructed under the fjord that surrounds the island, and the tunnel itself runs under the southern part of the island. Due to the length of the tunnel, a large ventilation shaft was constructed from the tunnel up to the island to provide fresh air inside the tunnel.

== Attractions ==
- Flor og Fjære, a collection of man-made tropical gardens, is located on the island of Hidle.
- Hidle has hosted one of the rounds of the Norway Chess tournament each year from 2013 through 2015.

== See also ==
- List of islands of Norway
