= Norway Chess 2025 =

Chess tournament

Norway Chess
- 2025
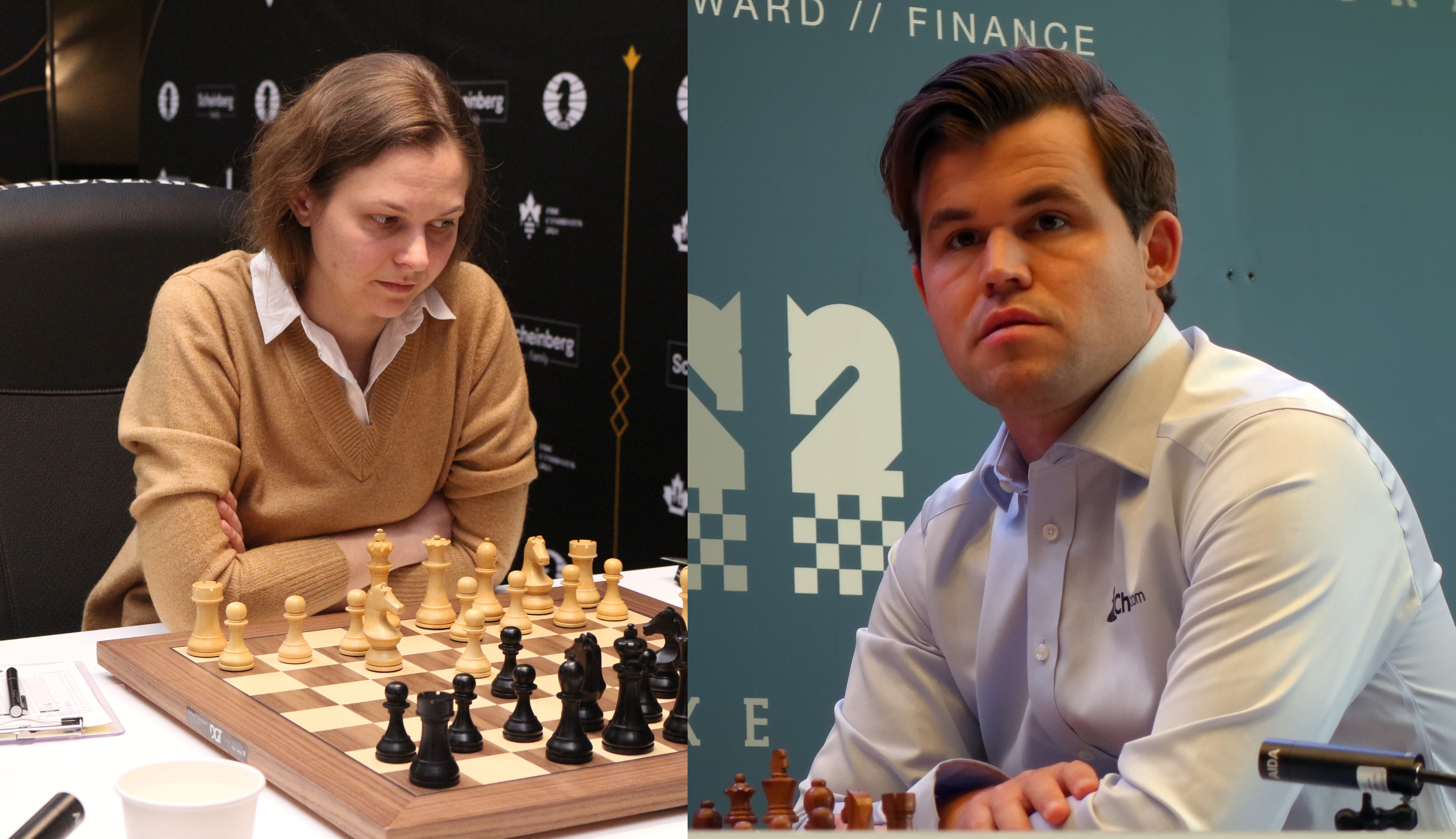
- Anna Muzychuk (left) and Magnus Carlsen (right)

Tournament information
- Sport: Chess
- Location: Stavanger, Norway
- Dates: 26 May–6 June
- Participants: 6 from 4 nations

Final positions
- Champions: Magnus Carlsen (Norway) (Open Section); Anna Muzychuk (Ukraine) (Women's Section)

Norway Chess 2025 was the 13th edition of the annual closed chess tournament held in Stavanger. It was held from 26 May to 6 June 2025. The field of six players featured world number one Magnus Carlsen, world champion Gukesh Dommaraju, Hikaru Nakamura, Arjun Erigaisi, Fabiano Caruana and Wei Yi. It marked the first classical chess encounter between Carlsen and Gukesh since the latter became world champion. The second edition of the Norway Chess Women was also held simultaneously, featuring women's world champion Ju Wenjun. Magnus and Ju were the defending champions.

Magnus successfully defended the title. Anna Muzychuk won the Women section and Ju finished 4th.

== Organization ==
Both tournaments were six-player, double round-robin tournaments, meaning there were 10 rounds with each player facing the others twice in classical chess. Like in previous editions, Norway Chess 2025 featured a unique system wherein players played an armageddon game in case the classical game was drawn.

The time control for the classical games was 120 minutes for the entire game, with an increment of 10 seconds starting from move 41. For the armageddon games, white got 10 minutes while black got 7 minutes but had draw odds. Players got 3 points for a classical win, 1½ points for an armageddon win, 1 point for an armageddon loss and 0 points for a classical loss.

== Participants ==
=== Open ===
Player	Rating	Ranking
Player	May 2025	
(Norway) Magnus Carlsen	2837	1
(United States) Hikaru Nakamura	2804	2
(India) Gukesh Dommaraju	2787	3
(India) Arjun Erigaisi	2782	4
(United States) Fabiano Caruana	2776	5
(China) Wei Yi	2758	8

=== Women ===
Player	Rating	Ranking
Player	May 2025	
(China) Ju Wenjun	2580	2
(China) Lei Tingjie	2552	3
(India) Humpy Koneru	2543	5
(Ukraine) Anna Muzychuk	2526	8
(India) Vaishali Rameshbabu	2475	16
(Spain) Sarasadat Khademalsharieh	2449	24

== Final standings ==
=== Open Section ===
13th Norway Chess, 26 May – 6 June 2025, Stavanger, Norway, Category XXII (2790.7)
	Player	Rating	1	2	3	4	5	6	Points
1	Magnus Carlsen (Norway)	2837		3 1½	3 0	1½ 1	3 1	1 1	16
2	Fabiano Caruana (United States)	2776	1 0		3 1	0 1½	3 0	3 3	15½
3	Gukesh Dommaraju (India)	2787	3 0	1½ 0		3 0	3 0	3 1	14½
4	Hikaru Nakamura (United States)	2804	1½ 1	1 3	3 0		1½ 1	1 1	14
5	Arjun Erigaisi (India)	2782	1½ 0	3 0	3 0	1 1½		1½ 1½	13
6	Wei Yi (China)	2758	1½ 1½	0 0	1½ 0	1½ 1½	1 1		9½

=== Women's Section ===
2nd Norway Chess Women, 26 May – 6 June 2025, Stavanger, Norway, Category XI (2520.8)
	Player	Rating	1	2	3	4	5	6	Points
1	Anna Muzychuk (Ukraine)	2526		1½ 1½	3 1½	1 3	1 1	1½ 1½	16½
2	Lei Tingjie (China)	2552	1 1		3 1	1½ 1	3 1½	0 3	16
3	Koneru Humpy (India)	2543	1 0	1½ 0		1½ 1	3 1	3 3	15
4	Ju Wenjun (China)	2580	0 1½	1½ 1	1½ 1		1½ 1	3 1½	13½
5	Vaishali Rameshbabu (India)	2475	1½ 1½	1 0	1½ 0	1½ 1		0 3	11
6	Sarasadat Khademalsharieh (Spain)	2449	1 1	0 3	0 0	1 0	0 3		9

== Summary ==
Carlsen–Gukesh, round 1

Position: a8 white rook, f8 white queen, g7 black pawn, h7 black king, d4 white pawn, c3 white knight, g3 black rook, d2 white king, h1 black queen

In this position, Gukesh played the losing 46...Qh6+? with less than thirty seconds on his clock; 46...Rg2+ would have led to a draw. Carlsen's king eventually reached safety on the queenside, before he started a decisive counterattack.

In the first round, Carlsen and Gukesh faced off in their first classical game since the Chess World Cup 2023, where Carlsen won 1.5-0.5 in the quarterfinals. After navigating a complex middlegame, Gukesh correctly sacrificed his knight to advance his passed pawn with 42...h3, initiating a pawn race. Both players promoted, and the game remained objectively balanced; however, 46...Qh6+ by Gukesh proved to be the decisive mistake, as Carlsen was able to bring his king to safety before executing his own king hunt.

Nakamura defeated Caruana with the black pieces in the first round, after initially offering his opponent a draw, which was rejected. Caruana later got low on time and blundered in the endgame. In the women's event, Humpy capitalized on an unstoppable checkmate threat after her opponent, Vaishali, "overpressed the position", while Lei and Muzychuk defeated Ju and Khadem respectively in armageddon.

In the second round, Caruana rebounded with a classical win over Wei Yi, while Gukesh suffered a second loss to Arjun in a hard-fought game where Arjun first built up a winning attack, then Gukesh equalized, before Arjun finally prevailed in the bishop versus knight endgame. Carlsen achieved a positional edge in classical against Nakamura, but couldn't convert it, while Nakamura turned the tables in a dramatic armageddon. In the women's event, Muzychuk took the sole lead after defeating Humpy in classical.

Caruana took the sole lead in round 3 with a win over Arjun in a sharp game, while Gukesh, on his 19th birthday, scored his first win of the event against Nakamura. After coming under time pressure in both of his first two games, Gukesh noted that he had managed his time better and got Nakamura into time pressure. Wei defeated Carlsen in armageddon after the latter once again failed to convert an edge in classical game. Humpy bounced back with a win over Khadem in the women's event to move into the shared lead with Muzychuk.

Carlsen snatched the sole lead in round 4 with a smooth win over Arjun. Gukesh saved a draw against Caruana in their classical game before winning in the armageddon. Wei also won in armageddon against Nakamura. Humpy and Muzychuk continued to lead the women's event, despite armageddon losses. Khadem won her classical game against Lei after being worse the whole game before her opponent blundered. The tournament resumed after a rest day before round 5. Caruana missed chances against Carlsen in classical, before the latter won in armageddon. Nakamura also missed chances in classical against Arjun, and blundered in a winning position in armageddon. Humpy took the sole lead in the women's event with an armageddon win.

Gukesh–Carlsen, round 6

Position: h5 white pawn, c4 white knight, f4 white king, b3 white pawn, d3 black pawn, e3 black pawn, e2 black king

The final position in which Carlsen resigned after Gukesh played 62.Kf4.

Gukesh and Carlsen met again in round 6; this time Gukesh having the white pieces. Carlsen outplayed his opponent for much of the game, but Gukesh defended stubbornly, finding only moves to continue the game. Carlsen ultimately faltered in a balanced position with 52...Ne2+??, giving up his knight in the hopes that his passed pawn would decide the game. Gukesh brought his knight back in time to stop the pawn, securing the win. Carlsen slammed the table in frustration after Gukesh's last move, before apologizing to his opponent and then promptly leaving the venue, skipping his media duties. Commentator and grandmaster David Howell described the game as the "turnaround of the year". The win was Gukesh's first against Carlsen in classical, and saw him climb to third place in the standings, a point behind Carlsen and Caruana.

Caruana retook the lead in round 7 with a win over Wei. Arjun, playing black against Gukesh, got a pleasant position out of the opening, but missed a difficult win and ended up on the defensive; Gukesh eventually converted his advantage, albeit after a turbulent endgame. Ju took the lead in the women's event with her first classical win, against Khadem. Lei also won her first classical game of the event after defeating Vaishali.

Frontrunners Caruana and Gukesh both lost in round 8 in contrasting fashions. Caruana outplayed Arjun with black to obtain a superior position, but fell behind on the clock early on. Arjun fought on in a seemingly one-sided position and managed to create winning chances; he ultimately exploited a decisive mistake by Caruana and went on to convert the advantage. Nakamura meanwhile won a smooth game after a disastrous positional mistake by Gukesh. Humpy regained the lead in the women's event after beating Khadem. Caruana continued to lead, half a point ahead of Carlsen, who lost to Wei in armageddon, and a point ahead of Gukesh and Nakamura.

Carlsen and Gukesh both won their games with white in round 9, allowing Carlsen to lead the tournament half a point ahead of Gukesh going into the final round. Carlsen sacrificed a pawn in the opening against Caruana, which made Caruana fall behind on the clock. Caruana reached a defensible position but played passively, allowing Carlsen to press for a win. Caruana eventually blundered under time pressure and lost. Gukesh reached a complex middlegame against Wei Yi with practical chances for both sides. After Wei Yi made some mistakes, Gukesh found a series of strong moves and won the game. In the women's event, Muzychuk took the sole lead after defeating Ju with the black pieces.

Caruana–Gukesh, round 10

Position: c8 black king, d8 black queen, c7 white bishop, h6 black pawn, d5 black rook, g5 black pawn, c4 white queen, e4 white knight, f4 white pawn, h3 white pawn, d2 black pawn, g2 white pawn, h2 white king

In this position, Gukesh played the losing 48...d1=Q?? with a few seconds on his clock; 48...Qxc7 or 48...Rd4 would have led to a draw. After 48...d1=Q, Caruana found 49.Bxd8+ Kxd8 50.Nc3!, forking black's queen and rook, winning the game.

In the final round, Carlsen, playing black, had a losing position against Arjun. However, Carlsen displayed his resourcefulness, equalizing the game and then turning it in his favor before it finally settled to a draw. Meanwhile, Gukesh, playing black, was losing against Caruana. However, the position was tricky to convert and Caruana ended up giving Gukesh some drawing chances. Under severe time pressure, Gukesh blundered and Caruana won the game, ending Gukesh's chances to win the tournament. The win meant that Carlsen won the tournament even though he lost his final armageddon game, with Caruana finishing in second and Gukesh in third. In the women's event, Muzychuk made a smooth draw with white against Vaishali to secure at least tied first. A win for Muzychuk in armageddon would have secured clear first place, but she wasn't able to win the winning rook endgame that occurred. However, Humpy was not able to win her game with white against Ju, making Muzychuk the winner of the tournament.
