= Indira Bajt =

Slovene chess player (born 1980)

Indira Bajt (BUY-t; née Babataeva, born 1980) is a Kazakhstani-Slovenian chess player. Bajt is a Woman FIDE Master (WFM) with a peak Elo rating of 2225. She was a member of the Slovenia women's team at the 39th Chess Olympiad.

She represented her native Kazakhstan until 2006.

== Notable results ==
- 1st place in the Slovenian Blitz Championship in 2010
- 2nd place in the Slovenian Women's Championship in 2010
- 2nd place in the Slovenian Women's Championship in 2009
- 2nd place in the Slovenian Women's Championship in 2007
- 3rd place in the Slovenian Women's Championship in 2006
