= Champions Chess Tour 2025–2026 =

Series of chess tournaments

Details
- Duration: 2 September 2025 – 27 May 2026
- Tournaments: 3

Achievements (singles)
- Prize money leader: (Norway) Magnus Carlsen ($153,713.40)
- Points leader: (United States) Hikaru Nakamura (182)

The Champions Chess Tour (CCT) 2025–2026 was a fast chess tournament circuit organized in 2025–2026 by Chess.com. The tour started on 2 September 2025 and ended on 27 May 2026. It involved three online chess tournaments, which determined 12 qualifying players of the 2026 Esports World Cup and up to 64 of the Esports Nations Cup.

The top three finishers in the Speed Chess Championship, top three finishers in the Chess.com Open and top six players in the leaderboard not qualified from the prior two events, had qualified for the Esports World Cup, while the top player from each nation, up to 64 players, in the leaderboard had qualified for the Esports Nations Cup.

== Tour points and prize money ==
The total prize pool for each tournament was US$250,000, except for the Titled Tuesday Grand Prix which had prize pool of US$3,000 for each Titled Tuesday and US$30,000 for each of the three splits, also Tour points were awarded for each Titled Tuesday result. It were distributed as follows:

=== Titled Tuesday Grand Prix (TTGP) ===
Points were based on placement within a given Titled Tuesday. Results beyond a player's top eight placements, within a split, were not counted.

Titled Tuesday			Split	
Finish	Points	Prize	Finish	Prize
1st	10	$1,000	1st	$5,000
2nd	7	$750	2nd	$3,000
3rd	5	$350	3rd	$2,500
4th	4	$250	4th	$1,500
5th	3	$150	5th	$1,000
6th	2	$100	6th	$750
7th	2	–	7th	$500
8th-10th	1	–	8th	$350
Top woman	–	$100	9th	$250
Top 3 streamers	–	$100 (×3)	10th	$150

=== Speed Chess Championship (SCC) ===
Prizes were awarded to participants of each Match based on the winner of the Match, and the win percentage of each player in the Match. For prizes split by win percentage, such win percentage was determined by a player's total points accumulated in the Match divided by the number of games played in the Match.

Finish	Points	Prize		
Finish	Points	Total Prize	Winner prize	Rest Split
1st	QF	$50,000	$25,000	By win percentage
2nd	QF	$50,000	$25,000	By win percentage
3rd	QF	$15,000	$7,500	By win percentage
4th	100	$15,000	$7,500	By win percentage
Semifinals	–	$30,000	$15,000	By win percentage
Quarterfinals (×4)	50	$15,000	$7,500	By win percentage
Round of 16 (×8)	0	$8,125	$4,062.50	By win percentage

=== Chess.com Open (CCO) ===
Finish	Points	Prize
1st	QF	$50,000
2nd	QF	$35,000
3rd	QF	$25,000
4th	100	$20,000
5th (×2)	75	$15,000
7th (×2)	50	$10,000
9th (×4)	35	$7,500
13th (×4)	20	$5,000
Play-In (3rd)	15	$1,500
Play-In (4th)	10	$1,000
Play-In (5th)	5	$500
Play-In (6th - 10th)	3	$200
Play-In (11th-20th)	2	–
Play-In (21st - 30th)	1	–

== Tournament schedule and results ==
Champions Chess Tour tournaments
Tournament		Dates	Prize	Winner	Second (or finalist)	Third	Fourth
Titled Tuesday Grand Prix
Titled Tuesday Grand Prix	Autumn Split	2 Sep 2025 – 25 Nov 2025	$3,000 (per Titled Tuesday) $30,000 (per Split)	(Norway) Magnus Carlsen	(United States) Hikaru Nakamura	(France) Alireza Firouzja	(FIDE) Denis Lazavik
Titled Tuesday Grand Prix	Winter Split	2 Dec 2025 – 24 Feb 2026	$3,000 (per Titled Tuesday) $30,000 (per Split)	(Norway) Magnus Carlsen	(Poland) Jan-Krzysztof Duda	(France) Maxime Vachier-Lagrave	(FIDE) Denis Lazavik
Titled Tuesday Grand Prix	Spring Split	3 Mar 2026 – 26 May 2026	$3,000 (per Titled Tuesday) $30,000 (per Split)	(Iran) Sina Movahed	(India) Nihal Sarin	(India) Arjun Erigaisi	(Poland) Jan-Krzysztof Duda
Speed Chess Championship		13 Oct 2025 – 9 Feb 2026	$250,000	(Norway) Magnus Carlsen	(France) Alireza Firouzja	(FIDE) Denis Lazavik	(United States) Hikaru Nakamura
Chess.com Open		14 Mar 2026 – 26 Apr 2026	$250,000	(Norway) Magnus Carlsen	(Poland) Jan-Krzysztof Duda	(FIDE) Denis Lazavik	(India) Nihal Sarin

== Standings ==
Prize money is shown in US dollars. The top six finishers in leaderboard who did not qualify via Speed Chess Championship and Chess.com Open qualified for the Esports World Cup. Upto 64 players will qualify for the 2026 Esports Nations Cup as well, with each nation's top player in the rankings qualifying; the Titled Tuesday Spring Split rankings will determine the remaining entrants if the leaderboard is insufficient for filling all 64 spots.

'QF' denotes that the player has qualified from another path.

- : 2025 Esports World Cup champion – already qualified for 2026 Esports World Cup
- : Qualified for 2026 Esports World Cup from another path
- : Qualified for 2026 Esports World Cup from leaderboard rankings

Final Rankings
Pos	Name	Speed Chess Championship	Chess.com Open	Titled Tuesday Grand Prix			Total	Prize money
Pos	Name	Speed Chess Championship	Chess.com Open	Autumn Split	Winter Split	Spring Split	Total	Prize money
1	(Norway) Magnus Carlsen	QF	QF	61	41	7	Qualified	$153,713.40
2	(Poland) Jan-Krzysztof Duda	0	QF	20	37	26	Qualified	$47,550
3	(FIDE) Denis Lazavik	QF	QF	24	30	9	Qualified	$68,220.47
4	(France) Alireza Firouzja	QF	0	32	0	0	Qualified	$59,106.94
5	(United States) Hikaru Nakamura	100	0	41	17	24	182	$39,804.88
6	(India) Nihal Sarin	0	100	1	4	29	134	$27,600
7	(FIDE) Ian Nepomniachtchi	50	40	13	7	11	121	$19,362.28
8	(Iran) Sina Movahed	0	75	0	10	36	121	$27,350
9	(France) Maxime Vachier-Lagrave	0	50	14	34	5	103	$17,200
10	(United States) Hans Niemann	50	10	10	1	21	92	$15,159.38
11	(Uzbekistan) Nodirbek Abdusattorov	0	75	3	3	10	91	$16,800
12	(United States) Fabiano Caruana	50	15	3	19	1	88	$13,697.29
13	(United States) Wesley So	50	15	0	5	11	81	$14,058.93
14	(India) Arjun Erigaisi	0	20	1	21	27	69	$12,691.07
15	(Serbia) Alexey Sarana	0	3	21	19	25	68	$7,350
16	(Germany) Vincent Keymer	0	40	6	19	0	65	$11,637.50
17	(India) Pranesh M	0	40	16	0	3	59	$9,000
18	(United States) Samuel Sevian	0	20	0	29	7	56	$8,800
19	(Uzbekistan) Javokhir Sindarov	0	20	1	22	10	53	$8,850
20	(FIDE) Daniil Dubov	0	50	0	0	1	51	$10,000
21	(China) Yu Yangyi	0	40	0	0	0	40	$7,500
22	(FIDE) Dmitry Andreikin	0	3	16	12	9	40	$3,450
23	(Iran) Parham Maghsoodloo	0	3	11	7	19	40	$3,650
24	(United States) Jeffery Xiong	0	3	12	15	9	39	$3,000
25	(Ukraine) Olexandr Bortnyk	0	5	18	1	6	30	$4,600

Pos	Name	Speed Chess Championship	Chess.com Open	Titled Tuesday Grand Prix			Total	Prize money
Pos	Name	Speed Chess Championship	Chess.com Open	Autumn Split	Winter Split	Spring Split	Total	Prize money
26	(Armenia) Haik M. Martirosyan	0	0	0	15	10	25	$2,150
27	(Vietnam) Lê Tuấn Minh	0	0	9	0	15	24	$2,754.17
28	(FIDE) Vladislav Artemiev	0	10	3	8	2	23	$2,600
29	(Mexico) José Martínez Alcántara	0	0	7	0	15	22	$3,551.36
30	(FIDE) Volodar Murzin	0	10	3	4	4	21	$2,500
31	(Armenia) Shant Sargsyan	0	20	0	0	0	20	$5,000
32	(Romania) Bogdan-Daniel Deac	0	1	7	11	1	20	$750
33	(Greece) Nikolas Theodorou	0	2	1	9	7	19	$1,000
34	(France) Marco Materia	0	15	0	1	1	17	$3,000
35	(India) Aravindh Chithambaram	0	10	2	0	5	17	$2,250
36	(FIDE) Alexander Grischuk	0	5	5	7	0	17	$1,500
37	(Peru) Renato Terry	0	1	7	5	3	16	$1,950
38	(FIDE) Andrey Esipenko	0	2	9	4	0	15	$850
39	(FIDE) Zhamsaran Tsydypov	0	0	0	1	14	15	$1,250
40	(Iran) Amin Tabatabaei	0	1	4	4	5	14	$350
41	(Germany) Matthias Blübaum	0	2	1	6	4	13	$1,400
42	(Vietnam) Đầu Khương Duy	0	0	5	0	8	13	$4,200
43	(Germany) Rasmus Svane	0	3	6	0	3	12	$1,750
44	(FIDE) Aleksandr Shimanov	0	0	5	3	4	12	$950
45	(FIDE) David Paravyan	0	1	9	0	0	10	$750
46	(United States) Andrew Tang	0	0	6	4	0	10	$600
47	(India) Vidit Gujrathi	0	3	6	0	0	9	$750
48	(Netherlands) Benjamin Bok	0	3	1	0	5	9	$1,050
49	(Serbia) Aleksandar Inđić	0	1	0	1	7	9	$750
50	(India) Bharath Subramaniyam	0	1	1	3	2	7	$150
51	(India) Pranav V	0	0	5	1	1	7	$200
52	(United States) Christopher Yoo	0	0	0	0	2	2	$750
53	(Argentina) Faustino Oro	0	0	0	5	2	7	$850
54	(Vietnam) Lê Quang Liêm	0	0	5	0	1	6	$2,118.75
55	(FIDE) Sergey Drygalov	0	0	3	0	3	6	$250
56	(United States) Levon Aronian	0	5	0	0	0	5	$1,000
57	(Vietnam) Nguyễn Ngọc Trường Sơn	0	3	0	0	2	5	$400
58	(Azerbaijan) Mahammad Muradli	0	1	2	2	0	5	$100
59	(Chile) Cristóbal Henríquez Villagra	0	1	0	4	0	5	$150
60	(France) Jules Moussard	0	0	4	0	1	5	$450
61	(Uzbekistan) Shamsiddin Vokhidov	0	1	0	0	3	4	$0
62	(Poland) Kacper Drozdowski	0	0	4	0	0	4	$250
63	(China) Xiao Tong	0	0	4	0	0	4	$250
64	(India) Raunak Sadhwani	0	3	0	0	0	3	$400
65	(Spain) Alan Pichot	0	3	0	0	0	3	$400
66	(Uzbekistan) Nodirbek Yakubboev	0	3	0	0	0	3	$400
67	(FIDE) Maxim Matlakov	0	3	0	0	0	3	$400
68	(Armenia) Samvel Ter-Sahakyan	0	3	0	0	0	3	$700
69	(Iran) Bardiya Daneshvar	0	2	0	0	1	3	$0
70	(FIDE) Maksim Tsaruk	0	2	1	0	0	3	$0
71	(Sweden) Nils Grandelius	0	1	0	0	2	3	$0
72	(Armenia) Emin Ohanyan	0	1	0	0	2	3	$0
73	(Poland) Zbigniew Pakleza	0	0	0	3	0	3	$250
74	(FIDE) Rudik Makarian	0	0	1	2	0	3	$0
75	(Kazakhstan) Rinat Jumabayev	0	0	1	2	0	3	$0
76	(Germany) Frederik Svane	0	0	0	0	3	3	$250
77	(United States) Daniel Naroditsky	0	0	3	0	0	3	$0
78	(Netherlands) Anish Giri	0	0	0	2	0	2	$1,673.44
79	(Spain) David Antón Guijarro	0	2	0	0	0	2	$0
80	(Egypt) Bassem Amin	0	2	0	0	0	2	$0
81	(Serbia) Bojan Maksimović	0	2	0	0	0	2	$0
82	(Israel) Nitzan Steinberg	0	2	0	0	0	2	$100
83	(United States) Grigoriy Oparin	0	2	0	0	0	2	$0
84	(Poland) Jakub Seemann	0	2	0	0	0	2	$0
85	(Greece) Stamatis Kourkoulos-Arditis	0	2	0	0	0	2	$0
86	(United States) Mikhail Antipov	0	2	0	0	0	2	$0
87	(Israel) Yahli Sokolovsky	0	2	0	0	0	2	$0
88	(India) P. Iniyan	0	2	0	0	0	2	$0
89	(Armenia) Aram Hakobyan	0	2	0	0	0	2	$0
90	(Azerbaijan) Vasif Durarbayli	0	0	0	2	0	2	$200
91	(Ukraine) Martyn Kravtsiv	0	0	1	1	0	2	$0
92	(Spain) José Carlos Ibarra Jeréz	0	0	0	0	2	2	$300
93	(Indonesia) Yoseph Taher	0	0	0	0	2	2	$500
94	(Azerbaijan) Murad Ibrahimli	0	0	2	0	0	2	$100
95	(Norway) Havard Haug	0	0	0	0	2	2	$100
96	(United Arab Emirates) Salem Saleh	0	0	2	0	0	2	$100
97	(Azerbaijan) Khagan Ahmed	0	0	2	0	0	2	$600
98	(FIDE) Aleksandr Usov	0	0	0	0	2	2	$0
99	(Slovenia) Vladimir Fedoseev	0	0	0	0	2	2	$0
100	(Iran) Reza Mahdavi	0	1	0	0	0	1	$0
101	(Chile) Rodrigo Vásquez Schroeder	0	1	0	0	0	1	$2,000
102	(Azerbaijan) Aydin Suleymanli	0	1	0	0	0	1	$0
103	(Armenia) Mamikon Gharibyan	0	1	0	0	0	1	$0

== Tournaments details ==
=== Titled Tuesday Grand Prix ===
Each player’s best eight results were counted toward the Grand Prix standings, which were organized into three Splits. Tiebreaks were decided by comparing players’ highest individual weekly finish among their counted results or the second-highest finish is compared, followed by the third, and so on until the tie was broken. If still tied then most number of Titled Tuesday events played would have been considered. The top eight finishers in the Winter Split qualified for Chess.com Open.

Finish	1st	2nd	3rd	4th	5th	6th-7th	8th-10th	< 10th
Points	10	7	5	4	3	2	1	0

==== Autumn Split (2 Sep 2025 – 25 Nov 2025) ====
Final standings
Pos	Name	Top finishes								Total
1	(Norway) Magnus Carlsen	1	1	1	1	2	2	4	5	61
2	(United States) Hikaru Nakamura	1	1	2	2	4	6	8	13	41
3	(France) Alireza Firouzja	1	2	2	3	5	12	13	253	32
4	(FIDE) Denis Lazavik	1	3	4	6	8	9	10	11	24
5	(Serbia) Alexey Sarana	1	4	4	5	23	24	27	30	21
6	(Poland) Jan-Krzysztof Duda	2	3	4	6	7	13	13	21	20
7	(Ukraine) Olexandr Bortnyk	1	2	9	12	17	17	17	21	18
8	(India) Pranesh M	1	5	7	8	45	155	157	213	16
9	(FIDE) Dmitry Andreikin	3	3	5	7	8	14	17	20	16
10	(France) Maxime Vachier-Lagrave	2	3	7	4	5				14

==== Winter Split (3 Dec 2025 – 24 Feb 2026) ====
Final Standings
Pos	Name	Top finishes								Total
1	(Norway) Magnus Carlsen	1	1	1	1	8	12	28	29	41
2	(Poland) Jan-Krzysztof Duda	1	2	2	2	3	10	12	13	37
3	(France) Maxime Vachier-Lagrave	1	1	2	3	7	79	134	137	34
4	(FIDE) Denis Lazavik	2	2	2	3	4	15	20	25	30
5	(United States) Samuel Sevian	1	2	3	4	6	8	11	14	29
6	(Uzbekistan) Javokhir Sindarov	1	1	6	227					22
7	(India) Arjun Erigaisi	2	2	3	8	9	11	34	67	21
8	(Germany) Vincent Keymer	1	2	10	10	19	23	310		19
9	(United States) Fabiano Caruana	1	3	5	10	32	225			19
10	(Serbia) Alexey Sarana	3	3	4	6	7	8	18	19	19

==== Spring Split (3 Mar 2026 – 26 May 2026) ====
Final Standings
Pos	Name	Top finishes								Total
1	(Iran) Sina Movahed	1	1	2	2	7	14	17	24	36
2	(India) Nihal Sarin	1	1	2	3	6	13	15		34
3	(India) Arjun Erigaisi	3	3	4	4	5	5	6	9	27
4	(Poland) Jan-Krzysztof Duda	1	1	4	9	10	13	19	26	26
5	(Serbia) Alexey Sarana	1	2	5	6	6	8	11	33	25
6	(United States) Hikaru Nakamura	1	3	3	7	9	10	16	22	24
7	(United States) Hans Niemann	2	3	4	4	8	14	196	344	21
10	(Iran) Parham Maghsoodloo	2	3	4	5	11	12	39	83	19
9	(Mexico) José Martínez Alcántara	1	4	9	35	114	255	312	328	15
10	(Vietnam) Lê Tuấn Minh	3	4	5	5	17	21	36	38	15

=== Speed Chess Championship ===
Round 1
1	(Norway) Magnus Carlsen	14.5
16	(Mexico) José Martínez Alcántara	8.5
8	(United States) Fabiano Caruana	11
9	(India) R Praggnanandhaa	10
5	(India) Arjun Erigaisi	9
12	(FIDE) Denis Lazavik	12
4	(United States) Hans Niemann	18
13	(China) Ding Liren	6
6	(France) Alireza Firouzja	16
11	(Vietnam) Lê Tuấn Minh	8
3	(FIDE) Ian Nepomniachtchi	17.5
14	(Netherlands) Anish Giri	10.5
7	(United States) Hikaru Nakamura	13.5
10	(Vietnam) Lê Quang Liêm	11.5
2	(United States) Wesley So	14
15	(Germany) Vincent Keymer	11

Quarterfinals
(Norway) Magnus Carlsen	14.5
(United States) Fabiano Caruana	7.5
(FIDE) Denis Lazavik	15.5
(United States) Hans Niemann	9.5
(France) Alireza Firouzja	19
(FIDE) Ian Nepomniachtchi	9
(United States) Hikaru Nakamura	11
(United States) Wesley So	10

Semifinals
(Norway) Magnus Carlsen	17
(FIDE) Denis Lazavik	9
(France) Alireza Firouzja	15
(United States) Hikaru Nakamura	13

Final
(Norway) Magnus Carlsen	15
(France) Alireza Firouzja	12
Consolation
(FIDE) Denis Lazavik	13.5
(United States) Hikaru Nakamura	12.5

=== Chess.com Open ===
The Chess.com Open was the world’s largest open online tournament, played across multiple stages with players advanced through rounds and play-ins to reach the final playoff bracket, which determined three qualification spots for the 2026 Esports World Cup.

=== Play-in (March 16–25) ===
Four play-ins determined the remaining playoff qualifiers. Players competed in a nine-round online Swiss tournament with time control of 10+0. The winner earned the right to draft their position in the playoff bracket. The second and third-placed players (after tiebreaks, if necessary) then competed in a mini-match, with Armageddon game used as a tiebreak. The winner of this match qualified along with the Play-in winner for the playoffs.

==== Play-in 1 (March 16) ====
Pos	Name	Score	SB
1	(FIDE) Ian Nepomniachtchi	7.5	44.5
2	(Uzbekistan) Nodirbek Abdusattorov	7	47.5
3	(United States) Wesley So	7	44
4	(United States) Hans Moke Niemann	7	38.5
5	(FIDE) Alexander Grischuk	6.5	36
Total entries: 90 players

Mini-match
Pos	Name	1	2	Armageddon	Score
1	(Uzbekistan) Nodirbek Abdusattorov	1	½	Not required	1½
2	(United States) Wesley So	0	½	Not required	½

==== Play-in 2 (March 18) ====
Pos	Name	Score	SB
1	(India) Pranesh M	7.5	47.5
2	(United States) Wesley So	7.5	46.5
3	(China) Yu Yangyi	7	46.5
4	(India) Aravindh Chithambaram	7	41.5
5	(Ukraine) Oleksandr Bortnyk	7	35
Total entries: 98 players

Mini-match
Pos	Name	1	2	Armageddon	Score
1	(China) Yu Yangyi	½	½	Win	2
2	(United States) Wesley So	½	½	Loss	1

==== Play-in 3 (March 23) ====
Pos	Name	Score	SB
1	(Iran) Sina Movahed	7.5	49
2	(United States) Fabiano Caruana	7	48.5
3	(FIDE) Daniil Dubov	7	46.5
4	(FIDE) Vladislav Artemiev	7	46
5	(India) Nihal Sarin	7	45
Total entries: 85 players

Mini-match
Pos	Name	1	2	Armageddon	Score
1	(FIDE) Daniil Dubov	1	1	Not required	2
2	(United States) Fabiano Caruana	0	0	Not required	0

==== Play-in 4 (March 25) ====
Pos	Name	Score	SB
1	(India) Nihal Sarin	7	47
2	(France) Marco Materia	7	42
3	(Armenia) Shant Sargsyan	7	42
4	(FIDE) Volodar Murzin	7	42
5	(United States) Levon Aronian	7	42
Total entries: 90 players

Mini-match
Pos	Name	1	2	Armageddon	Score
1	(Armenia) Shant Sargsyan	½	½	Win	2
2	(France) Marco Materia	½	½	Loss	1

=== Playoffs (April 23–26) ===
The playoffs were a double-elimination knockout bracket that featured eight players from the Titled Tuesday Grand Prix (TTGP) Winter Split and eight from the play-ins. Players were seeded by TTGP rank, after which play-in winners drafted their bracket positions in order of qualification. The Winners bracket matches consisted of four games with time control of 10+0, while Losers bracket matches consisted of two games. The higher seed got white in the first game. If there was a tie, then the match was decided by an Armageddon game, with white receiving 10 minutes and black the bid time.

Round 1	Winners Quarterfinals	Winners Semifinals	Winners Final	Grand Final + Reset
1	(Norway) Magnus Carlsen	2½
16	(Armenia) Shant Sargsyan	½
(Norway) Magnus Carlsen	2½
(Germany) Vincent Keymer	½
9	(India) Pranesh M	½
8	(Germany) Vincent Keymer	2½
(Norway) Magnus Carlsen	3
(FIDE) Denis Lazavik	2
5	(United States) Samuel Sevian	0
12	(Uzbekistan) Nodirbek Abdusattorov	3
(Uzbekistan) Nodirbek Abdusattorov	2
(FIDE) Denis Lazavik	3
13	(China) Yu Yangyi	1½
4	(FIDE) Denis Lazavik	2½
(Norway) Magnus Carlsen	3
(Poland) Jan-Krzysztof Duda	2
3	(France) Maxime Vachier-Lagrave	½
14	(India) Nihal Sarin	2½
(India) Nihal Sarin	3
(FIDE) Daniil Dubov	2
11	(FIDE) Daniil Dubov	3
6	(Uzbekistan) Javokhir Sindarov	0
(India) Nihal Sarin	0
(Poland) Jan-Krzysztof Duda	3
7	(India) Arjun Erigaisi	0
10	(Iran) Sina Movahed	3
(Iran) Sina Movahed	½	(Norway) Magnus Carlsen	½	2
(Poland) Jan-Krzysztof Duda	2½	(Poland) Jan-Krzysztof Duda	2½	0
15	(FIDE) Ian Nepomniachtchi	1
2	(Poland) Jan-Krzysztof Duda	3
Losers Round 1	Losers Round 2	Losers Round 3	Losers Quarterfinals	Losers Semifinals	Losers Final
(FIDE) Daniil Dubov	2
(FIDE) Denis Lazavik	1½
(India) Pranesh M	2	(India) Pranesh M	1
(FIDE) Daniil Dubov	0	(Iran) Sina Movahed	½
(Armenia) Shant Sargsyan	0
(Iran) Sina Movahed	2	(Poland) Jan-Krzysztof Duda	1½
(Iran) Sina Movahed (Note: Movahed won the match as black in the Armageddon game.)	2
(FIDE) Denis Lazavik	2	(FIDE) Denis Lazavik	½
(United States) Samuel Sevian	1	(China) Yu Yangyi	1
(India) Nihal Sarin	0
(China) Yu Yangyi	2
(Germany) Vincent Keymer	½
(India) Nihal Sarin	2
(France) Maxime Vachier-Lagrave	2	(France) Maxime Vachier-Lagrave	1½
(France) Maxime Vachier-Lagrave	½	(Uzbekistan) Nodirbek Abdusattorov	0
(Uzbekistan) Javokhir Sindarov	1
(Uzbekistan) Nodirbek Abdusattorov	1½
(Uzbekistan) Nodirbek Abdusattorov	1½
(India) Arjun Erigaisi	1	(FIDE) Ian Nepomniachtchi	½
(FIDE) Ian Nepomniachtchi	2

== Esports World Cup ==
The reigning Esports World Cup champion, Magnus Carlsen, automatically qualified for the next edition. The top three finishers in the Speed Chess Championship, top three finishers in the Chess.com Open and top six players in the leaderboard not qualified from the prior two events, qualified for the Esports World Cup.

== Esports Nations Cup ==
The Esports Nations Cup is a nation-focused tournament. Sixty-four players will automatically qualify for the event. The top player from each nation in the leaderboard will qualify for the event. Should the leaderboard qualify less than sixty-four players, the results of the Titled Tuesday Grand Prix (TTGP) Spring Split will be used to fill all remaining spots.
