= Champions Chess Tour 2026–2027 =

Series of chess tournaments

Details
- Duration: 1 September 2026 – 25 May 2027
- Tournaments: 3

Achievements (singles)
- Prize money leader: (United States) Hikaru Nakamura ($9,450)
- Points leader: (United States) Hikaru Nakamura (45)

The Champions Chess Tour (CCT) 2026–2027 is a fast chess tournament circuit organized in 2026–2027 by Chess.com. The tour started on 1 September 2026 and will end on 25 May 2027. It involves three online chess tournaments, which will determine 12 qualifying players of the 2027 Esports World Cup

== Tour points and prize money ==
The total prize pool is distributed as follows:

=== Titled Tuesday (TT) ===
Finish	Points	Prize
1st	10	$2,500
2nd	7	$1,500
3rd	5	$1,000
4th	4	$700
5th	3	$400
6th	2	$400
7th	2	$250
8th-10th	1	$250

=== Speed Chess Championship (SCC) ===
Prizes are awarded to participants of each Match based on the winner of the Match, and the win percentage of each player in the Match. For prizes split by win percentage, such win percentage is determined by a player's total points accumulated in the Match divided by the number of games played in the Match.

Finish	Points	Prize		
Finish	Points	Total Prize	Winner prize	Rest Split
1st	150	$50,000	$25,000	By win percentage
2nd	120	$50,000	$25,000	By win percentage
3rd	90	$15,000	$7,500	By win percentage
4th	60	$15,000	$7,500	By win percentage
Semifinals	–	$30,000	$15,000	By win percentage
Quarterfinals (×4)	30	$15,000	$7,500	By win percentage
Round of 16 (×8)	0	$8,125	$4,063	By win percentage

=== Chess.com Open (CCO) ===
Finish	Points
1st	150
2nd	120
3rd	90
4th	60
5th (×2)	40
7th (×2)	30
9th (×4)	20
13th (×4)	10
Play-In (3rd)	7
Play-In (4th)	5
Play-In (5th)	4
Play-In (6th-10th)	3
Play-In (11th-20th)	2
Play-In (21st-30th)	1

== Tournament schedule and results ==
Champions Chess Tour tournaments
Tournament	Dates	Prize	Winner	Second (or finalist)	Third	Fourth
Speed Chess Championship	16 Nov 2026 – 7 Feb 2027	$250,000				
Chess.com Open	Mar – Apr 2027	TBD				

== Standings ==
Prize money is shown in US dollars. The top twelve players will qualify for the Esports World Cup.

Standings as of 17 November 2026
Pos	Name	Titled Tuesday	Speed Chess Championship	Chess.com Open	Total	Prize money
1	(United States) Hikaru Nakamura	45			45	$9,450
2	(Iran) Sina Movahed	30			30	$6,900
3	(FIDE) Dmitry Andreikin	28			28	$5,400
4	(FIDE) Denis Lazavik	25			25	$5,250
5	(France) Alireza Firouzja	21			21	$5,000
6	(United States) Hans Niemann	19			19	$4,200
7	(United States) Wesley So	18			18	$3,900
8	(Serbia) Alexey Sarana	18			18	$3,400
9	(FIDE) Vladislav Artemiev	17			17	$3,600
10	(Germany) Vincent Keymer	16			16	$2,700
11	(United States) Fabiano Caruana	14			14	$3,200
12	(Vietnam) Lê Quang Liêm	12			12	$2,750
13	(United States) Andy Woodward	12			12	$2,750
14	(Poland) Jan-Krzysztof Duda	11			11	$2,150
15	(Iran) Amin Tabatabaei	10			10	$2,500
16	(United States) Jeffery Xiong	9			9	$1,450
17	(FIDE) Alexander Grischuk	8			8	$1,750
18	(India) Arjun Erigaisi	8			8	$1,750
19	(FIDE) Ian Nepomniachtchi	8			8	$1,400
20	(France) Maxime Vachier-Lagrave	7			7	$1,400
21	(India) Aravindh Chithambaram	6			6	$950
22	(India) Pranesh M	6			6	$950
23	(Germany) Tobias Kölle	5			5	$1,000
24	(FIDE) Zhamsaran Tsydypov	5			5	$1,000
25	(Argentina) Faustino Oro	5			5	$1,000

Pos	Name	Titled Tuesday	Speed Chess Championship	Chess.com Open	Total	Prize money
26	(India) Nihal Sarin	5			5	$1,000
27	(Germany) Dmitrij Kollars	5			5	$950
28	(Ukraine) Olexandr Bortnyk	5			5	$650
29	(Armenia) Haik M. Martirosyan	4			4	$400
30	(Germany) Matthias Blübaum	4			4	$650
31	(FIDE) Sergei Zhigalko	4			4	$500
32	(FIDE) David Paravyan	4			4	$1,000
33	(United States) Samuel Sevian	3			3	$650
34	(India) Pranav V	3			3	$500
35	(FIDE) Maxim Matlakov	2			2	$400
36	(United States) Awonder Liang	2			2	$400
37	(Greece) Nikolas Theodorou	2			2	$400
38	(Poland) Patryk Cieslak	2			2	$400
39	(Iran) Hamidreza Tahmasebi	2			2	$1,050
40	(Sweden) Nils Grandelius	2			2	$400
41	(Vietnam) Lê Tuấn Minh	2			2	$250
42	(Armenia) Shant Sargsyan	2			2	$250
43	(Uzbekistan) Nodirbek Yakubboev	2			2	$250
44	(Azerbaijan) Vasif Durarbayli	2			2	$250
45	(Iran) Artin Ashraf	2			2	$500
46	(Iran) Parham Maghsoodloo	2			2	$500
47	(FIDE) Rudik Makarian	1			1	$250
48	(Germany) Frederik Svane	1			1	$250
49	(Vietnam) Đầu Khương Duy	1			1	$250
50	(India) Bharath Subramaniyam	1			1	$250
51	(Peru) Renato Terry	1			1	$250
52	(Ukraine) Ihor Samunenkov	1			1	$250
53	(FIDE) Aleksandr Shimanov	1			1	$250
54	(FIDE) Semyon Puzyrevsky	1			1	$250

== Tournaments details ==
=== Titled Tuesday ===
1 September 2026 – 25 May 2027
Date	Winner	Second	Third	Ref
1 September 2026	(United States) Hans Niemann 10	(Poland) Jan-Krzysztof Duda 10	(Serbia) Alexey Sarana 10	
8 September 2026	(Vietnam) Lê Quang Liêm 9.5	(United States) Hikaru Nakamura 9.5	(Germany) Tobias Kölle 9.5	
15 September 2026	(Iran) Sina Movahed 9.5	(Germany) Vincent Keymer 9.5	(FIDE) Zhamsaran Tsydypov 9	
22 September 2026	(France) Alireza Firouzja 10	(FIDE) Denis Lazavik 9.5	(FIDE) Ian Nepomniachtchi 9	
29 September 2026	(United States) Wesley So 9.5	(FIDE) Denis Lazavik 9	(FIDE) Dmitry Andreikin 9	
6 October 2026	(FIDE) Vladislav Artemiev 9.5	(FIDE) Alexander Grischuk 9.5	(Serbia) Alexey Sarana 9.5	
13 October 2026	(United States) Fabiano Caruana 9.5	(United States) Hikaru Nakamura 9	(India) Nihal Sarin 9	
20 October 2026	(United States) Hikaru Nakamura 9.5	(FIDE) Dmitry Andreikin 9.5	(Iran) Sina Movahed 9.5	
27 October 2026	(United States) Andy Woodward 9.5	(India) Arjun Erigaisi 9.5	(France) Maxime Vachier-Lagrave 9.5	
3 November 2026	(France) Alireza Firouzja 10	(United States) Hikaru Nakamura 9.5	(United States) Hans Niemann 9	
10 November 2026	(Iran) Sina Movahed 9.5	(FIDE) Denis Lazavik 9.5	(FIDE) Dmitry Andreikin 9	
17 November 2026	(Iran) Amin Tabatabaei 9.5	(United States) Hikaru Nakamura 9.5	(Argentina) Faustino Oro 9	

=== Speed Chess Championship ===
The eight highest-ranked players on the CCT Leaderboard as of November 3, 2026, qualified for the Speed Chess Championship.

Round of 16
(Norway) Magnus Carlsen
(Iran) Sina Movahed
(Germany) Vincent Keymer
(Uzbekistan) Nodirbek Abdusattorov
(India) Nihal Sarin
(United States) Hans Moke Niemann
(Turkey) Yağız Kaan Erdoğmuş	8
(United States) Hikaru Nakamura	12
(Belarus) Denis Lazavik	12
(FIDE) Dmitry Andreikin	8
(United States) Wesley So
(India) R Praggnanandhaa
(United States) Fabiano Caruana
(Uzbekistan) Javokhir Sindarov
(FIDE) Vladislav Artemiev
(France) Alireza Firouzja

Quarterfinals
TBD
TBD
TBD
(United States) Hikaru Nakamura
(Belarus) Denis Lazavik
TBD
TBD
TBD

Semifinals
TBD
TBD
TBD
TBD

Final
TBD
TBD

=== Chess.com Open ===
The Chess.com Open is the world’s largest open online tournament, to be played across multiple stages with players advancing through rounds and play-ins to reach the final playoff bracket.

== Esports World Cup ==
The top twelve players will qualify for the Esports World Cup.
