= Las Vegas Freestyle Chess Grand Slam =

Fourth leg of the Freestyle Chess Grand Slam Tour

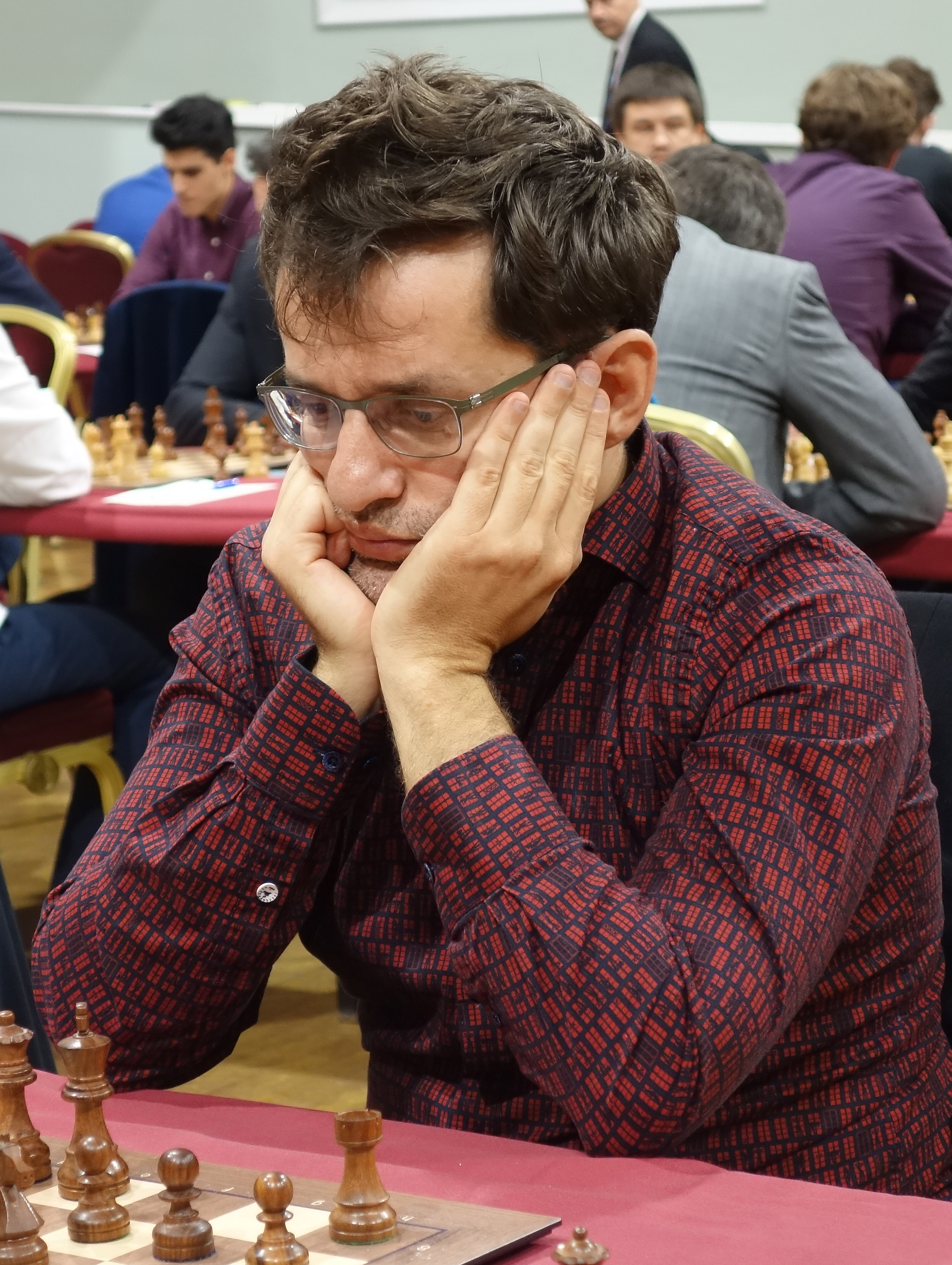
- Levon Aronian, the winner of the Las Vegas Freestyle Chess Grand Slam

Tournament information
- Sport: Chess variant (Chess960)
- Location: Las Vegas, United States
- Dates: 16 July 2025–20 July 2025
- Tournament format: Single-elimination tournament with round-robin seeding round
- Host: Freestyle Chess Operations
- Venue: Pavillon Chesnaie du Roy
- Participants: 16

Final positions
- Champion: (United States) Levon Aronian
- Runner-up: (United States) Hans Niemann
- 3rd place: (Norway) Magnus Carlsen

The Las Vegas Freestyle Chess Grand Slam was a Chess960 tournament that took place in Las Vegas, United States from 16 July to 20 July 2025. It was the fourth leg of the Freestyle Chess Grand Slam Tour, a series of Chess960 tournaments being held throughout 2025.

== Regulation changes ==
While the second leg had 12 participants playing in the main event, the number of participants was increased to 16 for the fourth leg. However, while before only the top eight players after the round-robin stage qualified for the main knockout bracket, now all the remaining eight players would still play for positions 3-16 in a modified double-elimination style format.

Another change to the format was the time control of the knockout stage, which was reduced from 90 minutes per player to 30, with an unchanged increment of 30 seconds. The change was made to have two games played on the same day and shorten the event's length. The round-robin and tiebreak games were unaffected.

== Qualification ==
All qualification matches were played online and were hosted by Chess.com. All non-titled players started qualification in one of two separate open qualifier events, which were held on June 14 and June 15 respectively, with the top three players from each event advancing to the Swiss stage. 146 players participated in the Swiss stage held on June 18. It was open to all titled players. The top four players, Rasmus Svane, Denis Lazavik, Pranesh M, and Martyn Kravtsiv advanced to the 16-player knockout stage.

Twelve players from the Freestyle Chess Players Club were invited directly to the knockout stage, held on June 19 and June 20. Hans Niemann defeated Denis Lazavik in the final, drawing with black pieces in the armageddon game, and qualified for the Grand Slam.

Round of 16 (Jun 19)
Martyn Kravtsiv (UKR)	2
Shakhriyar Mamedyarov (AZE)	0
Yu Yangyi (CHN)	1½
Vidit Gujrathi (IND)	½
Rasmus Svane (GER)	0
Hans Moke Niemann (USA)	2
Alexander Grischuk (FIDE)	2
Ding Liren (CHN)	3
Pranesh M (IND)	½
Vladimir Fedoseev (SVN)	1½
Andrey Esipenko (FIDE)	½
Jan-Krzysztof Duda (POL)	1½
Denis Lazavik (FIDE)	3
Maxime Vachier-Lagrave (FRA)	2
Alexey Sarana (SER)	½
Lê Quang Liêm (VIE)	1½

Quarterfinals (Jun 19)
Martyn Kravtsiv (UKR)	1½
Yu Yangyi (CHN)	2½
Hans Moke Niemann (USA)	1½
Ding Liren (CHN)	½
'Vladimir Fedoseev (SVN)	1½
Jan-Krzysztof Duda (POL)	½
Denis Lazavik (FIDE)	1½
Lê Quang Liêm (VIE)	½

Semifinals (Jun 20)
Yu Yangyi (CHN)	1
Hans Moke Niemann (USA)	3
Vladimir Fedoseev (SVN)	½
Denis Lazavik (FIDE)	1½

Final (Jun 20)
Hans Moke Niemann (USA)	2½
Denis Lazavik (FIDE)	2½
Third Place Match (Jun 20)
Yu Yangyi (CHN)	0
Vladimir Fedoseev (SVN)	2

=== 5th-8th Place ===
The four losers from the quarterfinal round above competed in the 5th-to-8th-place bracket.

(Jun 20)
Martyn Kravtsiv (UKR)	3
Ding Liren (CHN)	2
Jan-Krzysztof Duda (POL)	½
Lê Quang Liêm (VIE)	1½

Fifth Place Match (Jun 20)
Martyn Kravtsiv (UKR)	1½
Lê Quang Liêm (VIE)	2½
Seventh Place Match (Jun 20)
Ding Liren (CHN)	½
Jan-Krzysztof Duda (POL)	1½

Note: The player listed first played as white in the first game of the match. Scores between two players adding up to 2 indicate a win under rapid time controls; adding up to 4, a win under blitz time controls; and adding up to 5, a win in armageddon with bidding.

== Main event ==
=== Participants ===
Leading up to the later-to-be-called third leg of the Grand Slam Tour, the Grenke Freestyle Chess Open, the organizers of the Freestyle Tour and the Grenke Open announced to publish a world rating list for Freestyle based on the tournament results.

In their updated rules and regulations, Freestyle Chess increased the number of players in a Grand Slam to 16, and replaced the qualification path by FIDE rating with Freestyle rating.

Qualification method	Player	Age	Classical Rating	World Ranking	Freestyle Rating
Qualification method	Player	(June 2025)			
The top three finishers in the previous closed Grand Slam	(Norway) Magnus Carlsen (winner)	34	2837	1	2909
The top three finishers in the previous closed Grand Slam	(United States) Hikaru Nakamura (runner-up)	37	2804	2	2818
The top three finishers in the previous closed Grand Slam	(United States) Fabiano Caruana (third place)	32	2777	4	2804
World Chess Champion	(India) Gukesh Dommaraju (withdrew)	19	2776	5	2701
Winner of the Grenke Freestyle Chess Open	(Iran) Parham Maghsoodloo (runner-up, withdrew) (Note: Magnus Carlsen won the Grenke Freestyle Open, but since he had already qualified, Maghsoodloo qualified as the runner-up. However, he couldn't play due to visa issues.)	24	2691	38	2712
Winner of the Aeroflot Open 2025	(FIDE) Ian Nepomniachtchi (withdrew)	34	2757	10	2771
The three highest rated players in the June 2025 Freestyle Rating list	(India) R Praggnanandhaa	19	2767	7	2773
The three highest rated players in the June 2025 Freestyle Rating list	(Germany) Vincent Keymer	20	2730	22	2766
The three highest rated players in the June 2025 Freestyle Rating list	(France) Alireza Firouzja (withdrew)	22	2766	8	2764
Wild cards	(India) Arjun Erigaisi	21	2782	3	2758
Wild cards	(Uzbekistan) Nodirbek Abdusattorov	20	2767	6	2702
Wild cards	(United States) Leinier Domínguez	41	2738	18	2749
Wild cards	(United States) Levon Aronian	42	2742	16	2737
Wild cards	(United States) Wesley So	31	2745	14	2737
Wild cards	(India) Vidit Gujrathi (Note: Invited as fan favorite.)	30	2720	25	2713
Wild cards	(Uzbekistan) Javokhir Sindarov (Note: Invited as best junior.)	19	2710	29	2702
Wild cards	(Kazakhstan) Bibisara Assaubayeva (Note: Invited as best woman in the Freestyle Rating list.)	21	2509	547	2506
Replacements	(United States) Ray Robson (replacement for Maghsoodloo)	30	2687	40	2687
Replacements	(United States) Sam Sevian (replacement for Nepomniachtchi)	24	2683	43	N/A
Winner of the online play-in	(United States) Hans Niemann	22	2736	20	2722

=== Group Stage ===
The Round-robin stage was changed for the Las Vegas leg. Instead of one full round-robin including every player, the 16 players were broken up into two groups, "White" and "Black". Each player played every other in their respective groups, and the top four from each group advanced to the winners' bracket.

==== White Group ====
Round-robin, 16 July 2025
#	Player	1	2	3	4	5	6	7	8	Points	TB
1	R Praggnanandhaa (IND)	*	½	½	0	1	1	½	1	4½	
2	Nodirbek Abdusattorov (UZB)	½	*	½	0	½	1	1	1	4½	
3	Javokhir Sindarov (UZB)	½	½	*	1	½	1	½	½	4½	
4	Levon Aronian (USA)	1	1	0	*	0	0	1	1	4	2
5	Magnus Carlsen (NOR)	0	½	½	1	*	1	0	1	4	0
6	Vincent Keymer (GER)	0	0	0	1	0	*	1	1	3	
7	Wesley So (USA)	½	0	½	0	1	0	*	1	3	
8	Bibisara Assaubayeva (KAZ)	0	0	½	0	0	0	0	*	½	

==== Black Group ====
Round-robin, 16 July 2025
#	Player	1	2	3	4	5	6	7	8	Points
1	Hikaru Nakamura (USA)	*	1	1	½	½	1	1	1	6
2	Hans Niemann (USA)	0	*	1	0	1	½	1	1	4½
3	Arjun Erigaisi (IND)	0	0	*	½	½	1	1	1	4
4	Fabiano Caruana (USA)	½	1	½	*	½	½	½	½	4
5	Leinier Domínguez (USA)	½	0	½	½	*	1	½	0	3
6	Sam Sevian (USA)	0	½	0	½	0	*	½	1	2½
7	Ray Robson (USA)	0	0	0	½	½	½	*	1	2½
8	Vidit Gujrathi (IND)	0	0	0	½	1	0	0	*	1½

=== Knockout Stage ===
==== Upper Bracket ====
Quarterfinals (Jul 17)
W1	R Praggnanandhaa (IND)	3
B4	Fabiano Caruana (USA)	4
B2	Hans Niemann (USA)	4
W3	Javokhir Sindarov (UZB)	2
B1	Hikaru Nakamura (USA)	1½
W4	Levon Aronian (USA)	2½
W2	Nodirbek Abdusattorov (UZB)	½
B3	Arjun Erigaisi (IND)	1½

Semifinals (Jul 18)
B4	Fabiano Caruana (USA)	1½
B2	Hans Niemann (USA)	2½
W4	Levon Aronian (USA)	2
B3	Arjun Erigaisi (IND)	0

Final (Jul 20)
B2	Hans Niemann (USA)	½
W4	Levon Aronian (USA)	1½

==== Lower Bracket ====
Lower Quarterfinals (Jul 17)
B6	Sam Sevian (USA)	½
W7	Wesley So (USA)	1½
B5	Leinier Domínguez (USA)	1½
W8	Bibisara Assaubayeva (KAZ)	½
W6	Vincent Keymer (GER)	2½
B7	Ray Robson (USA)	1½
W5	Magnus Carlsen (NOR)	2
B8	Vidit Gujrathi (IND)	0

Intermediate Stage 1 (Jul 18)
W2	Nodirbek Abdusattorov (UZB)	1
W7	Wesley So (USA)	3
B1	Hikaru Nakamura (USA)	2
B5	Leinier Domínguez (USA)	0
W1	R Praggnanandhaa (IND)	1½
W6	Vincent Keymer (GER)	½
W3	Javokhir Sindarov (UZB)	½
W5	Magnus Carlsen (NOR)	1½

Intermediate Stage 2 (Jul 19)
W7	Wesley So (USA)	½
B1	Hikaru Nakamura (USA)	1½
W1	R Praggnanandhaa (IND)	1
W5	Magnus Carlsen (NOR)	3

Lower Semifinals (Jul 19)
B4	Fabiano Caruana (USA)	1
B1	Hikaru Nakamura (USA)	3
B3	Arjun Erigaisi (IND)	0
W5	Magnus Carlsen (NOR)	2

Third Place Match (Jul 20)
B1	Hikaru Nakamura (USA)	½
W5	Magnus Carlsen (NOR)	1½

==== Fifth and Seventh Place Matches ====
Fifth Place Match (Jul 20)
B4	Fabiano Caruana (USA)	2
B3	Arjun Erigaisi (IND)	0

Seventh Place Match (Jul 20)
W7	Wesley So (USA)	½
W1	R Praggnanandhaa (IND)	1½

=== Final classification ===
Pos.	Player	Prize money	Points
1	Levon Aronian (USA)	$200,000	25
2	Hans Niemann (USA)	$140,000	18
3	Magnus Carlsen (NOR)	$100,000	15
4	Hikaru Nakamura (USA)	$60,000	12
5	Fabiano Caruana (USA)	$50,000	10
6	Arjun Erigaisi (IND)	$40,000	8
7	R Praggnanandhaa (IND)	$30,000	6
8	Wesley So (USA)	$20,000	4
9–12	Nodirbek Abdusattorov (UZB)	$10,000	2
9–12	Javokhir Sindarov (UZB)	$10,000	2
9–12	Leinier Domínguez (USA)	$10,000	2
9–12	Vincent Keymer (GER)	$10,000	2
13–16	Ray Robson (USA)	$7,500	0
13–16	Sam Sevian (USA)	$7,500	0
13–16	Bibisara Assaubayeva (KAZ)	$7,500	0
13–16	Vidit Gujrathi (IND)	$7,500	0
