= 2026 Esports World Cup – Chess =

Chess tournament at the 2026 Esports World Cup

Chess at the 2026 Esports World Cup
Tournament information
- Game: Chess
- Location: Paris, France
- Date: August 11–15, 2026
- Administrator: Esports Foundation; Chess.com
- Tournament format(s): 8 player double-elimination play-in 16 player double-elimination group stage 8 player single-elimination playoffs
- Participants: 22 players from 15 teams
- Purse: US$1,500,000
- Website: esportsworldcup.com/en/competitions/2026/chess

Final positions
- Champion: Magnus Carlsen (Team Liquid)
- Runner-up: Denis Lazavik (AG.AL)

The chess tournament at the 2026 Esports World Cup was held in Paris, France, from August 11 to 15, 2026. Twenty-two players from fifteen teams took part in this tournament – The reigning Esports World Cup champion, 3 players from 2025 Speed Chess Championship, 3 from 2026 Chess.com Open, 6 players from Champions Chess Tour 2025–2026 standings, 1 player from Road to EWC – India Rising, 3 players from Road to EWC – DreamHack Atlanta and 5 players from the Last Chance Qualifier. Twenty-two players from qualified based on their player's performance in these tournaments. Magnus Carlsen from Team Liquid retained his title by defeating Denis Lazavik from AG.AL in the Grand final with 4 rounds to spare.

It was the second edition of the chess tournament at the Esports World Cup, which is part of a two-year partnership between online gaming platform Chess.com and the Esports Foundation (2025–2026) to bring online chess into the event.

== Format ==
In the play-in stage, the three players which qualified from DreamHack Atlanta and five from the Last Chance Qualifier were drawn into a double-elimination bracket, with the top two players advancing to the group stage.

In the group stage, the remaining sixteen players were divided into two groups and competed in a double-elimination bracket, with the first four players to achieve two wins in each group advancing to the quarterfinals.

The playoffs were an eight-player single-elimination bracket. The players that lost in the semifinals had to compete in a third-place match. Quarterfinal matches in the playoffs were best-of-fours, while the semifinal matches and the third-place playoff were best-of-six. The Grand Final was a best-of-three set match, with the first two set consisting of four games each and the third set consisting of two games.

== Qualification ==
The reigning Esports World Cup champion automatically qualified along with three players from 2025 Speed Chess Championship, three from 2026 Chess.com Open, six from Champions Chess Tour 2025–2026 standings, one from Road to EWC – India Rising, three from Road to EWC – DreamHack Atlanta and five from the Last Chance Qualifier.

=== Qualified players ===
Event	Qualifier
2025 Esports World Cup	Magnus Carlsen (Team Liquid)
2025 Speed Chess Championship	~~Magnus Carlsen (Team Liquid)~~
2025 Speed Chess Championship	Alireza Firouzja (Team Falcons)
2025 Speed Chess Championship	Denis Lazavik (AG.AL)
2026 Chess.com Open	~~Magnus Carlsen (Team Liquid)~~
2026 Chess.com Open	Jan-Krzysztof Duda (Weibo Gaming)
2026 Chess.com Open	~~Denis Lazavik (AG.AL)~~
Champions Chess Tour 2025–2026 standings	Hikaru Nakamura (Team Falcons)
Champions Chess Tour 2025–2026 standings	Nihal Sarin (S8UL Esports)
Champions Chess Tour 2025–2026 standings	Ian Nepomniachtchi (Aurora Gaming)
Champions Chess Tour 2025–2026 standings	Sina Movahed (Team Stallions)
Champions Chess Tour 2025–2026 standings	Hans Niemann (GodLike Esports)
Champions Chess Tour 2025–2026 standings	Nodirbek Abdusattorov (Natus Vincere)
Champions Chess Tour 2025–2026 standings	Arjun Erigaisi (Gen.G Esports)
Champions Chess Tour 2025–2026 standings	Alexey Sarana (Fnatic)
Champions Chess Tour 2025–2026 standings	Pranesh M (S8UL Esports)
Road to EWC – DreamHack Atlanta	Aravindh Chithambaram (S8UL Esports)
Road to EWC – DreamHack Atlanta	~~Alexey Sarana (Fnatic)~~
Road to EWC – DreamHack Atlanta	Lê Quang Liêm (Team Flash)
Road to EWC – DreamHack Atlanta	Andrey Esipenko (Virtus.pro)
Road to EWC – India Rising	Benjamin Bok (Team MGD1)
Last Chance Qualifier	Wei Yi (Team Nemesis)
Last Chance Qualifier	Vladislav Artemiev (Team Spirit)
Last Chance Qualifier	Alexander Grischuk
Last Chance Qualifier	Parham Maghsoodloo
Last Chance Qualifier	Olexandr Bortnyk

== Draw ==
A draw was conducted for the group stage on 11 August 2026.

Group A	Group B
Nodirbek Abdusattorov (Natus Vincere)	Hikaru Nakamura (Team Falcons)
Pranesh M (S8UL Esports)	Alexey Sarana (Fnatic)
Jan-Krzysztof Duda (Weibo Gaming)	Denis Lazavik (AG.AL)
Benjamin Bok (Team MGD1)	Sina Movahed (Team Stallions)
Arjun Erigaisi (Gen.G Esports)	Magnus Carlsen (Team Liquid)
Nihal Sarin (S8UL Esports)	Andrey Esipenko (Virtus.pro)
Alireza Firouzja (Team Falcons)	Hans Niemann (GodLike Esports)
Wei Yi (Team Nemesis)	Ian Nepomniachtchi (Aurora Gaming)

== Play-in ==
- Dates: 11 August 2026
- 8 players are drawn into a double-elimination-style bracket.
- The top two players advance to the Group stage. Remaining players are eliminated.
- Time control: 10+0
- In the Armageddon, the player who either wins or draws with the black pieces gets a full point and wins the match.

Upper round 1	Upper round 2	Upper final	Group Stage Qualified
11 August, 12:00 CEST
C Aravindh (S8UL Esports)	1
11 August, 14:30 CEST
A Grischuk	2
A Grischuk	0.5
11 August, 12:00 CEST
V Artemiev (Team Spirit)	1.5
V Artemiev (Team Spirit)	2
11 August, 17:10 CEST
P Maghsoodloo	1
V Artemiev (Team Spirit)	0.5
11 August, 13:10 CEST
Y Wei (Team Nemesis)	1.5
LQ Lê (Team Flash)	0.5
11 August, 14:30 CEST
O Bortnyk	1.5
O Bortnyk	0
11 August, 13:10 CEST
Y Wei (Team Nemesis)	2
A Esipenko (Virtus.pro)	0.5
Y Wei (Team Nemesis)	1.5	Y Wei (Team Nemesis)
A Esipenko (Virtus.pro)
Lower round 1	Lower round 2	Lower round 3	Lower final
11 August, 16:00 CEST
11 August, 15:40 CEST	O Bortnyk	0.5	11 August, 18:30 CEST
C Aravindh (S8UL Esports)	0.5	P Maghsoodloo	1.5	11 August, 17:10 CEST	V Artemiev (Team Spirit)	0.5
P Maghsoodloo	1.5	P Maghsoodloo	1	A Esipenko (Virtus.pro)	1.5
11 August, 16:00 CEST	A Esipenko (Virtus.pro)	2
11 August, 15:40 CEST	A Grischuk	0.5
LQ Lê (Team Flash)	1	A Esipenko (Virtus.pro)	1.5
A Esipenko (Virtus.pro)	2

Upper round 1	11 August	Aravindh Chithambaram	1	–	2	Alexander Grischuk	Paris, France
	12:00 (UTC+2)						
		0	Game 1			1	
		1	Game 2			0	
		0	Armageddon			1	

Upper round 1	11 August	Vladislav Artemiev	2	–	1	Parham Maghsoodloo	Paris, France
	12:00 (UTC+2)						
		0.5	Game 1			0.5	
		0.5	Game 2			0.5	
		1	Armageddon			0	

Upper round 1	11 August	Lê Quang Liêm	0.5	–	1.5	Olexandr Bortnyk	Paris, France
	13:10 (UTC+2)						
		0.5	Game 1			0.5	
		0	Game 2			1	

Upper round 1	11 August	Andrey Esipenko	0.5	–	1.5	Wei Yi	Paris, France
	13:10 (UTC+2)						
		0.5	Game 1			0.5	
		0	Game 2			1	

Upper round 2	11 August	Vladislav Artemiev	1.5	–	0.5	Alexander Grischuk	Paris, France
	14:30 (UTC+2)						
		1	Game 1			0	
		0.5	Game 2			0.5	

Upper round 2	11 August	Wei Yi	2	–	0	Olexandr Bortnyk	Paris, France
	14:30 (UTC+2)						
		1	Game 1			0	
		1	Game 2			0	

Lower round 1	11 August	Aravindh Chithambaram	0.5	–	1.5	Parham Maghsoodloo	Paris, France
	15:40 (UTC+2)						
		0	Game 1			1	
		0.5	Game 2			0.5	

Lower round 1	11 August	Lê Quang Liêm	1	–	2	Andrey Esipenko	Paris, France
	15:40 (UTC+2)						
		1	Game 1			0	
		0	Game 2			1	
		0	Armageddon			1	

Lower round 2	11 August	Parham Maghsoodloo	1.5	–	0.5	Olexandr Bortnyk	Paris, France
	16:00 (UTC+2)						
		0.5	Game 1			0.5	
		1	Game 2			0	

Lower round 2	11 August	Andrey Esipenko	1.5	–	0.5	Alexander Grischuk	Paris, France
	16:00 (UTC+2)						
		0.5	Game 1			0.5	
		1	Game 2			0	

Lower round 3	11 August	Andrey Esipenko	2	–	1	Parham Maghsoodloo	Paris, France
	17:10 (UTC+2)						
		1	Game 1			0	
		0	Game 2			1	
		1	Armageddon			0	

Upper round 3	11 August	Vladislav Artemiev	0.5	–	1.5	Wei Yi	Paris, France
	17:10 (UTC+2)						
		0.5	Game 1			0.5	
		0	Game 2			1	

Lower final	11 August	Andrey Esipenko	1.5	–	0.5	Vladislav Artemiev	Paris, France
	18:30 (UTC+2)						
		1	Game 1			0	
		0.5	Game 2			0.5	

== Group stage ==
- Dates: 12–13 August 2026
- 16 players are drawn into two groups of eight players each.
- Each group plays a double-elimination-style bracket.
- The top four players from each group advance to the playoffs. Remaining players are eliminated.
- Time control: 10+0
- In the Armageddon, the player who either wins or draws with the black pieces gets a full point and wins the match.

=== Group A ===
Opening Match
12 August, 12:00 CEST
N Abdusattorov (Natus Vincere)	2
M Pranesh (S8UL Esports)	0
12 August, 12:00 CEST
J-K Duda (Weibo Gaming)	2
B Bok (Team MGD1)	0
12 August, 13:10 CEST
A Erigaisi (Gen.G Esports)	2
S Nihal (S8UL Esports)	0
12 August, 13:10 CEST
A Firouzja (Team Falcons)	1.5
Y Wei (Team Nemesis)	0.5
Elimination Match
13 August, 13:00 CEST
S Nihal (S8UL Esports)	2
Y Wei (Team Nemesis)	1
13 August, 13:00 CEST
M Pranesh (S8UL Esports)	2
B Bok (Team MGD1)	1

Winners Match
12 August, 16:40 CEST
N Abdusattorov (Natus Vincere)	2
J-K Duda (Weibo Gaming)	0
12 August, 16:40 CEST
A Erigaisi (Gen.G Esports)	1
A Firouzja (Team Falcons)	2
Decider Match
13 August, 15:20 CEST
J-K Duda (Weibo Gaming)	0.5
S Nihal (S8UL Esports)	1.5
13 August, 16:30 CEST
A Erigaisi (Gen.G Esports)	2
M Pranesh (S8UL Esports)	0

Playoffs Qualified
N Abdusattorov (Natus Vincere)
A Firouzja (Team Falcons)
Playoffs Qualified
S Nihal (S8UL Esports)
A Erigaisi (Gen.G Esports)

Opening Match	12 August	Nodirbek Abdusattorov	2	–	0	Pranesh M	Paris, France
	12:00 (UTC+2)						
		1	Game 1			0	
		1	Game 2			0	

Opening Match	12 August	Jan-Krzysztof Duda	2	–	0	Benjamin Bok	Paris, France
	12:00 (UTC+2)						
		1	Game 1			0	
		1	Game 2			0	

Opening Match	12 August	Arjun Erigaisi	2	–	0	Nihal Sarin	Paris, France
	13:10 (UTC+2)						
		1	Game 1			0	
		1	Game 2			0	

Opening Match	12 August	Alireza Firouzja	2	–	1	Wei Yi	Paris, France
	13:10 (UTC+2)						
		1	Game 1			0	
		0	Game 2			1	
		0.5	Armageddon			0.5	

Winners' Match	12 August	Jan-Krzysztof Duda	0	–	2	Nodirbek Abdusattorov	Paris, France
	16:40 (UTC+2)						
		0	Game 1			1	
		0	Game 2			1	

Winners' Match	12 August	Alireza Firouzja	2	–	1	Arjun Erigaisi	Paris, France
	16:40 (UTC+2)						
		1	Game 1			0	
		0	Game 2			1	
		0.5	Armageddon			0.5	

Elimination Match	13 August	Nihal Sarin	2	–	1	Wei Yi	Paris, France
	13:00 (UTC+2)						
		0.5	Game 1			0.5	
		0.5	Game 2			0.5	
		1	Armageddon			0	

Elimination Match	13 August	Pranesh M	2	–	1	Benjamin Bok	Paris, France
	13:00 (UTC+2)						
		1	Game 1			0	
		0	Game 2			1	
		0.5	Armageddon			0.5	

Decider Match	13 August	Jan-Krzysztof Duda	0.5	–	1.5	Nihal Sarin	Paris, France
	15:20 (UTC+2)						
		0.5	Game 1			0.5	
		0	Game 2			1	

Decider Match	13 August	Arjun Erigaisi	2	–	0	Pranesh M	Paris, France
	16:30 (UTC+2)						
		1	Game 1			0	
		1	Game 2			0	

=== Group B ===
Opening Match
12 August, 15:30 CEST
M Carlsen (Team Liquid)	1.5
A Esipenko (Virtus.pro)	0.5
12 August, 15:30 CEST
H Niemann (GodLike Esports)	2
I Nepomniachtchi (Aurora Gaming)	1
12 August, 14:20 CEST
H Nakamura (Team Falcons)	1.5
A Sarana (Fnatic)	0.5
12 August, 14:20 CEST
D Lazavik (AG.AL)	2
S Movahed (Team Stallions)	1
Elimination Match
13 August, 14:10 CEST
A Esipenko (Virtus.pro)	0.5
I Nepomniachtchi (Aurora Gaming)	1.5
13 August, 14:10 CEST
A Sarana (Fnatic)	1
S Movahed (Team Stallions)	2

Winners Match
12 August, 17:50 CEST
M Carlsen (Team Liquid)	1.5
H Niemann (GodLike Esports)	0.5
12 August, 17:50 CEST
H Nakamura (Team Falcons)	1.5
D Lazavik (AG.AL)	0.5
Decider Match
13 August, 18:50 CEST
D Lazavik (AG.AL)	1.5
I Nepomniachtchi (Aurora Gaming)	0.5
13 August, 17:40 CEST
H Niemann (GodLike Esports)	1.5
S Movahed (Team Stallions)	0.5

Playoffs Qualified
M Carlsen (Team Liquid)
H Nakamura (Team Falcons)
Playoffs Qualified
D Lazavik (AG.AL)
H Niemann (GodLike Esports)

Opening Match	12 August	Hikaru Nakamura	1.5	–	0.5	Alexey Sarana	Paris, France
	14:20 (UTC+2)						
		0.5	Game 1			0.5	
		1	Game 2			0	

Opening Match	12 August	Denis Lazavik	2	–	1	Sina Movahed	Paris, France
	14:20 (UTC+2)						
		1	Game 1			0	
		0	Game 2			1	
		1	Armageddon			0	

Opening Match	12 August	Hans Niemann	2	–	1	Ian Nepomniachtchi	Paris, France
	15:30 (UTC+2)						
		0	Game 1			1	
		1	Game 2			0	
		1	Armageddon			0	

Opening Match	12 August	Magnus Carlsen	1.5	–	0.5	Andrey Esipenko	Paris, France
	15:30 (UTC+2)						
		1	Game 1			0	
		0.5	Game 2			0.5	

Winners' Match	12 August	Magnus Carlsen	1.5	–	0.5	Hans Niemann	Paris, France
	17:50 (UTC+2)						
		1	Game 1			0	
		0.5	Game 2			0.5	

Winners' Match	12 August	Hikaru Nakamura	1.5	–	0.5	Denis Lazavik	Paris, France
	17:50 (UTC+2)						
		1	Game 1			0	
		0.5	Game 2			0.5	

Elimination Match	13 August	Ian Nepomniachtchi	1.5	–	0.5	Andrey Esipenko	Paris, France
	14:10 (UTC+2)						
		1	Game 1			0	
		0.5	Game 2			0.5	

Elimination Match	13 August	Alexey Sarana	1	–	2	Sina Movahed	Paris, France
	14:10 (UTC+2)						
		0	Game 1			1	
		1	Game 2			0	
		0.5	Armageddon			0.5	

Decider Match	13 August	Hans Niemann	1.5	–	0.5	Sina Movahed	Paris, France
	17:40 (UTC+2)						
		1	Game 1			0	
		0.5	Game 2			0.5	

Decider Match	13 August	Denis Lazavik	1.5	–	0.5	Ian Nepomniachtchi	Paris, France
	18:50 (UTC+2)						
		0.5	Game 1			0.5	
		1	Game 2			0	

== Playoffs ==
- Dates: 14–15 August 2026
- Eight players will be drawn into matchups based on a draw.
- Time control: 10+0
- In the Armageddon, the player who either wins or draws with the black pieces gets a full point and wins the match.

Quarterfinals
14 August, 14:50 CEST
Magnus Carlsen (Team Liquid)	2.5
Nihal Sarin (S8UL Esports)	0.5
14 August, 14:50 CEST
Alireza Firouzja (Team Falcons)	2.5
Hans Niemann (GodLike Esports)	1.5
14 August, 13:00 CEST
Nodirbek Abdusattorov (Natus Vincere)	2
Denis Lazavik (AG.AL)	3
14 August, 13:00 CEST
Hikaru Nakamura (Team Falcons)	3
Arjun Erigaisi (Gen.G Esports)	2

Semifinals
14 August, 19:10 CEST
Magnus Carlsen (Team Liquid)	4
Alireza Firouzja (Team Falcons)	1
14 August, 16:40 CEST
Denis Lazavik (AG.AL)	3.5
Hikaru Nakamura (Team Falcons)	1.5

Final
15 August, 16:30 CEST
Magnus Carlsen (Team Liquid)	2
Denis Lazavik (AG.AL)	0
Third place
15 August, 13:00 CEST
Hikaru Nakamura (Team Falcons)	4
Alireza Firouzja (Team Falcons)	1

Quarterfinals	14 August	Nodirbek Abdusattorov	2	–	3	Denis Lazavik	Paris, France
	13:00 (UTC+2)						
		0.5	Game 1			0.5	
		0.5	Game 2			0.5	
		0.5	Game 3			0.5	
		0.5	Game 4			0.5	
		0	Armageddon			1	

Quarterfinals	14 August	Hikaru Nakamura	3	–	2	Arjun Erigaisi	Paris, France
	13:00 (UTC+2)						
		0.5	Game 1			0.5	
		0.5	Game 2			0.5	
		0.5	Game 3			0.5	
		0.5	Game 4			0.5	
		1	Armageddon			0	

Quarterfinals	14 August	Alireza Firouzja	2.5	–	1.5	Hans Niemann	Paris, France
	14:50 (UTC+2)						
		1	Game 1			0	
		0.5	Game 2			0.5	
		0.5	Game 3			0.5	
		0.5	Game 4			0.5	

Quarterfinals	14 August	Magnus Carlsen	2.5	–	0.5	Nihal Sarin	Paris, France
	14:50 (UTC+2)						
		1	Game 1			0	
		1	Game 2			0	
		0.5	Game 3			0.5	
			~~Game 4~~				

Semifinals	14 August	Denis Lazavik	3.5	–	1.5	Hikaru Nakamura	Paris, France
	16:40 (UTC+2)						
		0.5	Game 1			0.5	
		0.5	Game 2			0.5	
		1	Game 3			0	
		0.5	Game 4			0.5	
		1	Game 5			0	
			~~Game 6~~				

Semifinals	14 August	Magnus Carlsen	4	–	1	Alireza Firouzja	Paris, France
	19:10 (UTC+2)						
		0.5	Game 1			0.5	
		0.5	Game 2			0.5	
		1	Game 3			0	
		1	Game 4			0	
		1	Game 5			0	
			~~Game 6~~				

Third Place Playoff	15 August	Hikaru Nakamura	4	–	1	Alireza Firouzja	Paris, France
	13:00 (UTC+2)						
		0.5	Game 1			0.5	
		1	Game 2			0	
		0.5	Game 3			0.5	
		1	Game 4			0	
		+	Game 5			–	
			~~Game 6~~				

Grand Final (Set 1)	15 August	Magnus Carlsen	1	–	0	Denis Lazavik	Paris, France
	16:30 (UTC+2)						
		1	Game 1			0	
		0.5	Game 2			0.5	
		0.5	Game 3			0.5	
		1	Game 4			0	

Grand Final (Set 2)	15 August	Denis Lazavik	0	–	1	Magnus Carlsen	Paris, France
	16:30 (UTC+2)						
		0	Game 1			1	
		0.5	Game 2			0.5	
		0.5	Game 3			0.5	
		0	Game 4			1	

== Ranking ==
A base prize pool of US$1,500,000 was offered for the tournament. The prize pool was spread among the players as seen below:

Place	Team	Prize (USD)
1st	Magnus Carlsen (Team Liquid)	$250,000
2nd	Denis Lazavik (AG.AL)	$190,000
3rd	Hikaru Nakamura (Team Falcons)	$145,000
4th	Alireza Firouzja (Team Falcons)	$100,000
5th–8th	Nihal Sarin (S8UL Esports)	$72,500
5th–8th	Hans Niemann (GodLike Esports)	$72,500
5th–8th	Arjun Erigaisi (Gen.G Esports)	$72,500
5th–8th	Nodirbek Abdusattorov (Natus Vincere)	$72,500
9th–12th	Ian Nepomniachtchi (Aurora Gaming)	$52,500
9th–12th	Sina Movahed (Team Stallions)	$52,500
9th–12th	Pranesh M (S8UL Esports)	$52,500
9th–12th	Jan-Krzysztof Duda (Weibo Gaming)	$52,500
13th–16th	Alexey Sarana (Fnatic)	$40,000
13th–16th	Andrey Esipenko (Virtus.pro)	$40,000
13th–16th	Wei Yi (Team Nemesis)	$40,000
13th–16th	Benjamin Bok (Team MGD1)	$40,000
17th	Vladislav Artemiev (Team Spirit)	$32,000
18th	Parham Maghsoodloo	$27,000
19th–20th	Olexandr Bortnyk	$25,000
19th–20th	Alexander Grischuk	$25,000
21st–22nd	Lê Quang Liêm (Team Flash)	$23,000
21st–22nd	Aravindh Chithambaram (S8UL Esports)	$23,000

== See also ==
- Champions Chess Tour 2025–2026
