= Hans Niemann =

American chess grandmaster (born 2003)

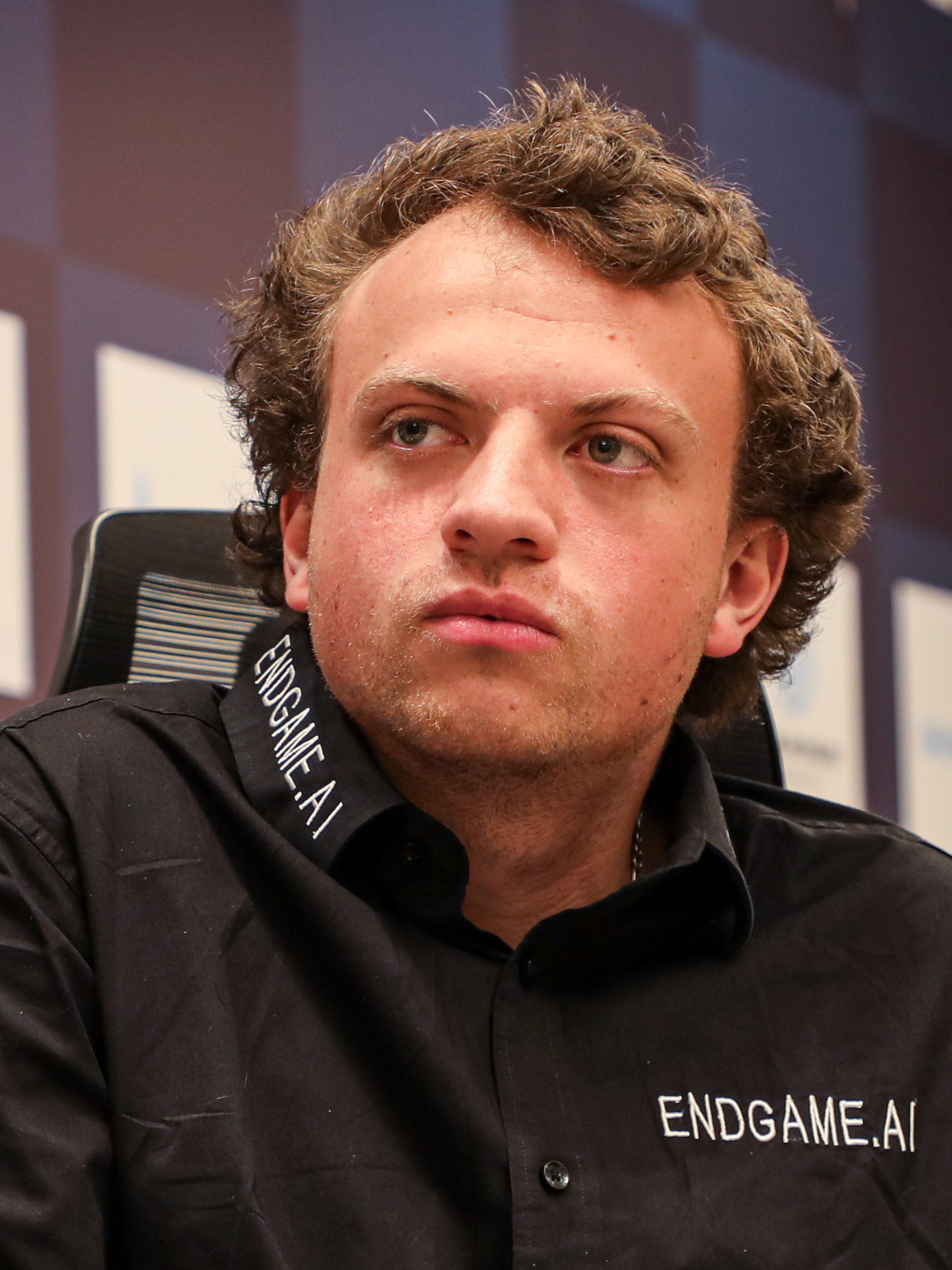
- Niemann in 2026

Personal information
- Born: Hans Moke Niemann; June 20, 2003 (age 23) San Francisco, California, U.S.

Chess career
- Country: United States
- Title: Grandmaster (2021)
- FIDE rating: 2697 (November 2026)
- Peak rating: 2742 (May 2026)
- Ranking: No. 32 (November 2026)
- Peak ranking: No. 12 (May 2026)

Hans Moke Niemann (born June 20, 2003) is an American chess grandmaster and Twitch streamer. He first entered the top 100 junior players list on March 1, 2019, and became a FIDE grandmaster on January 22, 2021. In July 2021, he won the World Open chess tournament in Philadelphia. He achieved a peak global ranking of No. 12 in May 2026.

Niemann was part of a controversy in 2022 after defeating reigning World Chess Champion Magnus Carlsen in that year's Sinquefield Cup. Carlsen and Chess.com accused Niemann of cheating, leading to a $100 million defamation lawsuit that was ultimately settled out of court.

== Early life and education ==
Niemann was born in San Francisco, California, and is of mixed Hawaiian and Danish ancestry. He moved to the Netherlands at the age of seven, where he attended a Leonardoschool for the gifted and started playing chess. He eventually returned to the United States, attending schools in Orinda, California, and Weston, Connecticut, before finally attending Columbia Grammar & Preparatory School in New York City for his junior and senior years of high school. He then became financially independent while working as a chess teacher to support himself.

== Chess career ==
=== Training ===
Niemann attended the U.S. Chess School alongside future grandmasters Andrew Tang, Abhimanyu Mishra, Awonder Liang, Christopher Yoo, and David Brodsky—as well as future U.S. Women's Chess Champion Carissa Yip. While there, he received training from grandmasters Joshua Friedel, Ben Finegold and Jacob Aagaard. He also received training from international master John Grefe, whom he considers his "first serious chess coach."

=== 2012–2015 ===
In 2012, Niemann qualified for the Dutch National Youth Chess Championship. Later, in December, he participated in his first rated tournament in the U.S. In 2013, he participated in the SuperNationals V in Nashville with a rating of 1486, scoring 4/7.

On December 16, 2014, Niemann became the youngest-ever winner of the Tuesday Night Marathon at the Mechanics' Institute Chess Club, the oldest chess club in the United States, earning him the title of USCF master. He also competed in the under-12 section of the 2014 World Youth Chess Championships in Durban, South Africa, scoring 6/11. By January, he had crossed the 2000-Elo rating threshold for the first time with a rating of 2192.

=== 2016–2018 ===
From 2016 to 2023, Niemann was a part of the U.S. Chess Federation's All-America Chess Team. After becoming a FIDE master in early 2016, he competed in the Saint Louis Invitational IM Norm. He and Carissa Yip were among the youngest players in the competition. He also competed in the 2016 North American Youth Championship, tying for first place in the under-18 section. In 2017, he entered the SuperNationals VI tournament as the top seed in the K–8 category with a rating of 2412, ultimately finishing in first place. Niemann has competed in the PRO Chess League since 2017, playing for the Las Vegas Desert Rats (2017), Saint Louis Arch Bishops (2019, winning team) and Norway Gnomes (2020).

In August 2018, Niemann competed in the U.S. Masters Championship, earning both a GM and an IM norm. He became eligible for the title of international master after his performance at the Cambridge IM Norm Invitational in August 2018, officially receiving the title later that year. From November 24 – December 3, Niemann participated in the World Youth Under-16 Olympiad in Konya, Turkey—scoring six consecutive wins before finally finishing in third place overall. Then, from December 14–16, he played in the National K–12 Grade Championships, winning the blitz competition with a perfect score of 12/12, tying for first place in the bughouse duo competition, and tying for first place in the event overall.

=== 2019–2021 ===
From 2019 to 2021, Niemann's Elo rating rose from 2466 to 2645.

In April 2019, Niemann won the Foxwoods Open blitz event with a perfect 10/10 score. Then in June, he won the inaugural ChessKid Games hosted by Chess.com in a duos team with Alexander Wang, with Niemann scoring 20 straight victories in the event and qualifying for the 2020 Junior Speed Chess Championship. Later that month, he tied for sixth place at the 2019 U.S. Junior Championships in a field including Awonder Liang, Andrew Tang, and John M. Burke. In October, he participated in the 2019 World Youth Championships, leading the Open Under-16 section for seven rounds with a performance rating of nearly 2600 before ultimately finishing in ninth place. In November, Niemann competed in the 103rd Edward Lasker Memorial, tying for first place and achieving a GM norm. Then in December, he played in the National K–12 Grade Championships again, scoring 12/12 in the blitz event, 10/10 in the bughouse duo competition, and 7/7 in the 11th-Grade Championship.

In April 2020, Niemann participated in the FIDE World Youth Championship, placing sixth in the American Continental Selection Open. Then in November, he achieved his third and final GM norm at the Charlotte Chess Center & Scholastic Academy GM Norm Invitational, placing first in the event overall. Also in November, he won the 75th Annual Texas State Amateur Championship in Fort Worth, Texas with a score of 6½/7. In December, Niemann won the blitz competition at the VII Sunway Sitges International Chess Festival. He also surpassed the 2500 Elo threshold required to become a grandmaster, officially receiving the title in 2021.

In January 2021, Niemann placed third in the Vergani Cup, held in Bassano del Grappa, Italy. In February, he played in the Winter Chess Festival "Paraćin 2021" event in Paraćin, Serbia, winning both the classical and blitz sections with scores of 7/10 and 10½/11 respectively. Then in April, Niemann was featured on the front cover of Chess Life magazine, with a cover story documenting his journey to becoming a grandmaster and an accompanying podcast. In July, Niemann won the World Open in Philadelphia, Pennsylvania, defeating John M. Burke in tiebreaks. Later that month, he won the U.S. Junior Championship hosted by the Saint Louis Chess Club (SLCC), which entitled him to compete in the 2022 U.S. Chess Championship. In August, he finished second behind grandmaster Aleksandr Lenderman at the 121st U.S. Open Chess Championship with a score of 8/9.

=== 2022 ===
In May 2022, Niemann broke into the classical top 100 with a rating of 2656. He was the 12th-ranked American. In August, he participated in the FTX Crypto Cup, winning a game with the black pieces in a second-round match against Magnus Carlsen. In the post-game interview after defeating Carlsen, Niemann said "chess speaks for itself" before walking off. Despite winning four other games, Niemann did not win any of his overall matches in the tournament, finishing last out of a field of eight with zero match points. A few weeks later, at the 2022 Sinquefield Cup, Niemann won another game against Carlsen, leading Carlsen to withdraw from the tournament and sparking international controversy. Niemann then faced Carlsen again two weeks later in the Julius Baer Generation Cup. Carlsen resigned the game after one move, further fueling the controversy.

In December, Niemann placed second at the Chessable Sunway Sitges Open after winning in tiebreaks against Amin Tabatabaei. As a result of the tournament, Niemann's rating rose above 2700 on the official FIDE ratings list for the first time. Later that month, Niemann played in the World Rapid & Blitz Chess Championships in Kazakhstan, finishing 100th out of 177 in the rapid section and 47th out of 176 in the blitz section.

=== 2023 ===
In April 2023, Niemann finished sixth out of 200 at the Menorca Open, with the top ten players all tying for first place with scores of 7/9 after the nine-round round-robin. Gukesh D ultimately won the event after tiebreaks. Later that month, he participated in the Kazakhstan Chess Cup, a "side event" to the 2023 World Chess Championship held in Astana at the same time. He finished sixth in a field of 167. In May, he played in the Baku Open International Chess Festival, starting as the top seed but ultimately finishing 54th out of 122. International master Prraneeth Vuppala achieved a surprise victory against Niemann in the tournament, crossing the 2500 Elo mark necessary to become a grandmaster as a result. Later that month, Niemann participated in the 2023 Dubai Open Chess Tournament as the second-highest seed. He finished 47th after losing to non-titled player Xue Haowen with the white pieces in the eighth round.

In June, Niemann won the 1000GM 2023 Las Vegas Super Swiss after tiebreaks with grandmaster Mikhail Antipov. Then in July, he won the Uralsk Open 2023 in Kazakhstan with a score of 7½/9. In August, he won the Timișoara Grand Prix Rapid, the third stage of the Romanian Grand Prix. He then transferred to the fourth stage Arad Grand Prix Classic, placing second after grandmaster Haik Martirosyan. Later in the month, he reached a settlement with Chess.com and began playing games on their site again. In October, Niemann competed in the U.S. Chess Championship at the SLCC, coming in seventh. Then in November, he joined the Tournament of Peace, a ten-player GM round robin, as the second seed. He ultimately won by a three-point margin, with a final score of 8/9. In December, he played in the World Rapid & Blitz Chess Championships again, this time finishing 26th out of 105 in the rapid section and 39th out of 206 in the blitz section.

=== 2024 ===
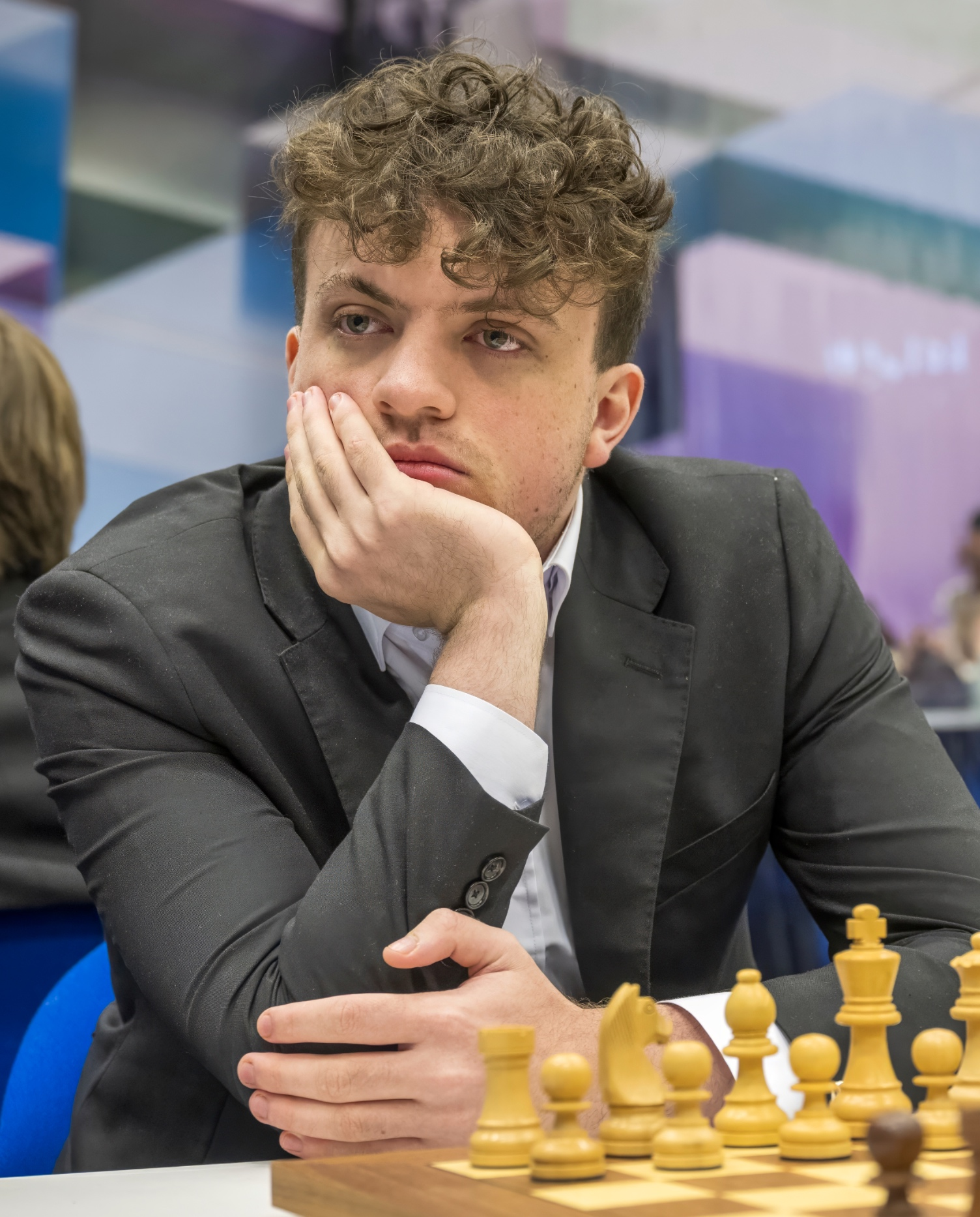
Niemann at the 2024 Tata Steel Chess Tournament

In January 2024, Niemann competed in the Tata Steel Chess Tournament's B section. After starting the tournament with wins against grandmaster Liam Vrolijk and international master Divya Deshmukh, he suffered back-to-back losses against international master Eline Roebers and grandmaster Marc Andria Maurizzi, ultimately finishing in seventh place.

In February, the SLCC prohibited Niemann from participating in any of their invitational tournaments in 2024, citing his "inappropriate behavior." It was later revealed that Niemann caused damage to his hotel room during the 2023 U.S. Chess Championship, with Niemann publishing a video confirming that he had damaged a hotel room but claiming that he had "incessantly apologized and was supposed to be reinstated by the hotel."

Niemann also played in the Djerba Chess Masters in February, defeating grandmasters Aryan Tari and Bilel Bellahcene but suffering another loss against Marc Andria Maurizzi. He ultimately finished the tournament in second place after tiebreaks against grandmaster Daniel Dardha. In April, he participated in the Grenke Chess Open, scoring 8/9 and coming in first place with victories against grandmasters Frederik Svane and Velimir Ivić. Then in May, Niemann played in the Dubai Global Police Chess Challenge, starting off slowly with three draws against 2400-rated international masters. However, he was able to score wins against grandmasters Aydin Suleymanli and S. P. Sethuraman in the seventh and eighth rounds respectively. He ultimately finished the event in a tie for fourth place, with a score of 6½/9.

In June, Niemann launched his official website, "GMHans.com," offering chess training, Q&A sessions, and personal advice. He also played for Tremblay-en-France in the French Team Championship, scoring a personal 5/7 with victories against grandmasters Markus Ragger, Arturs Neikšāns, and Marc Andria Maurizzi. By July, his rating had risen to 2703, the first time it had been over 2700 for over a year. In August, Niemann was the team captain for the official GMHans.com team in the FIDE World Rapid & Blitz Team Championships. His team placed tenth in the rapid event and got to the quarterfinals of the blitz event, ultimately losing to grandmaster Jan Gustafsson's WR Chess Team.

Later that month, Niemann started the "Hans Niemann Against The World" event on GMHans.com. The event saw Niemann match up against several top-50 players, including Anish Giri, Nikita Vitiugov, and Étienne Bacrot, facing each of them in their respective FIDE countries (The Netherlands, England, and France). Each match consisted of six classical and rapid games and twelve blitz games. For match points, wins in the classical portion were worth three points, wins in the rapid games were worth two points, and wins in the blitz games were worth one point. Niemann defeated Giri, 24–18, winning 3½–2½ in classical, tying 3–3 in rapid, and winning 7½–4½ in blitz. He subsequently defeated Vitiugov, 25–12. He scored victories in all three formats, going 8–5 in classical, 8–4 in rapid, and 9–3 in blitz. He finally defeated Bacrot, 27–12, winning the classical portion 4½–1½, tying the rapid portion 3–3, and winning the blitz portion, 9–3. As a result of his victories in the event, Niemann gained 22 rating points and entered the top 20 in the world in classical.

From August to September, Niemann participated in the Speed Chess Championship, defeating grandmaster Maxime Vachier-Lagrave in the first round, 12½–11½. He then defeated grandmaster Wesley So in the second round, 13–10. As a result, Niemann was slated to face Magnus Carlsen in the semifinals. The match was highly anticipated, with Niemann expressing a desire to take revenge on Carlsen for allegedly defaming him. In the end, Carlsen defeated Niemann 17½–12½, taking an early lead in the 5+1 format before drawing Niemann in the 3+1 and 1+1 formats. Niemann then played against Hikaru Nakamura in the consolation match, losing, 21–9.

Niemann finished the World Rapid Chess Championship 2024 with a score of 8½/13, defeating Hikaru Nakamura in the last round. He ranked 6th in a 10-way tie for the first place in the Swiss-system tournament of World Blitz Chess Championship 2024, qualifying for the knockout stage, in which he lost, 2½–1½ to Magnus Carlsen in the quarterfinals. In the 10th round he was paired with Daniil Dubov, who missed the game, claiming that he got to his hotel room and fell asleep in the 15 minutes between rounds.

=== 2025 ===
In March 2025, Niemann played in Aeroflot Open 2025, followed by an 18-game blitz match (3+2) lasting two days against Dubov in Moscow, the loser having to answer a question from the winner under a polygraph. Niemann trailed the event on the first day with a score of 5½–3½. On the second day he struck back to equalize the score to 8½–8½ before the last round. He lost the last round, the match ending with a score of 9½–8½. A rematch of the same format was played in May, in which they tied, 9–9. The match was then settled with two additional games, where Niemann won the first one, ending the match with a score of 10½–9½.

In February 2025, Niemann did not qualify for the first leg of the Freestyle Chess Grand Slam Tour in Weissenhaus and withdrew before the Paris leg in April. In July, he reached the final of the Las Vegas leg of the Freestyle Chess Grand Slam, defeating Javokhir Sindarov and Fabiano Caruana in the knockout stage before losing to Levon Aronian, 1½–½, in the final. His performance earned him a runner-up prize of $140,000 and 18 Grand Slam points, placing him 7th in the tour standings and securing a spot in the final leg.

In the Last Chance Qualifier for the 2025 Esports World Cup, Niemann won his group with a score of 6/7, including victories over Denis Lazavik and Volodar Murzin. He lost the qualifying match to Javokhir Sindarov as he drew with the white pieces in the armageddon game. Niemann had another opportunity to qualify through the losers bracket in a match against Anish Giri, which he lost, 2½–½.

In September, Niemann played in the Grand Swiss Tournament, scoring 7/11. The following month he participated in the 2025 United States Chess Championship, finishing 5th with a score of 5½/11. In round 5, Niemann defeated Abhimanyu Mishra, ending his 71-game unbeaten streak.

In November, Niemann entered the Chess World Cup 2025 as the 10th seed receiving a bye in round 1. He was eliminated in the next round after losing in the first set of rapid tie-breaks to 119th-seeded Lorenzo Lodici.

Niemann participated in the Speed Chess Championship, defeating Ding Liren, 18–6, in the round of 16. He lost to Denis Lazavik 15½–9½ in the quarterfinals.

In December, Niemann played in the Cape Town leg of the Freestyle Chess Grand Slam Tour, where he placed 5–6th in the round-robin stage. He lost in the quarterfinals to Levon Aronian and in the lower-bracket semifinals to Arjun Erigaisi. He defeated Parham Maghsoodloo in the match for 7th place, obtaining the 8th place in the tour with 33 points. Shortly before the tournament, Niemann played in a four-player Chess960 Diving chess tournament. He defeated Fabiano Caruana in the final, becoming the first American Freestyle Diving Chess champion.

Niemann finished fourth in the World Rapid Chess Championship 2025 with a score of 9½/13, one point behind winner Magnus Carlsen. He ranked 141st in the World Blitz Chess Championship 2025.

=== 2026 ===
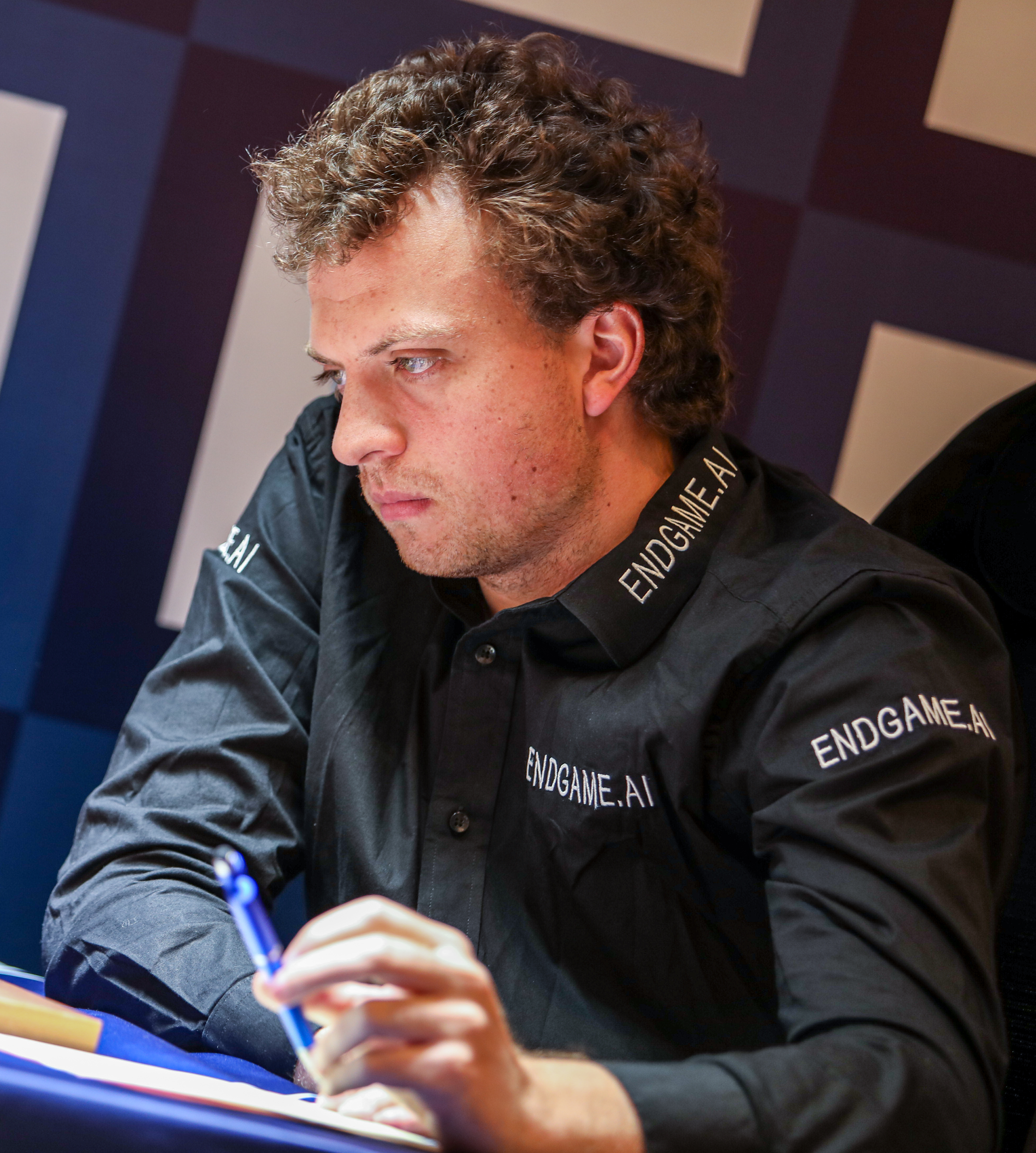
Niemann at the 2026 UzChess Cup

In January, Niemann participated in the 2026 Tata Steel Chess India tournament. He placed 5th in the rapid event and 4th in the blitz event, scoring 5/9 and 10/18, respectively. Later that month, Niemann played in the Masters section of the Tata Steel Chess Tournament 2026, where he tied for third place with a score of 7½/13, but officially came in fourth after Sonneborn-Berger tiebreaks.

In February, Niemann competed in the FIDE Freestyle Chess World Championship 2026. He placed 5th in the group stage, moving to the lower bracket, where he defeated Levon Aronian and Arjun Erigaisi to secure 5th place.

In March, Niemann played in the Masters section of the 2026 Prague International Chess Festival. He finished in 8th place out of 10 after tiebreaks, with a final score of 4/9.

In April, Niemann competed in Grenke Freestyle Chess Open 2026, scoring 6½/9. Later that month, he defeated Awonder Liang in a 12-game classical match (60+30) with a score of 7½–4½.

In May, Niemann won the 2026 GCT Super Rapid & Blitz Poland, placing first in the rapid section and third in the blitz section, becoming the first American to win any section of the Grand Chess Tour. Later the same month, he drew an 8-game classical match with Ian Nepomniachtchi. Subsequently, he was invited to play for the US Chess Olympic team for the first time.

In June, Niemann placed 7th/10 in the Masters section of the UzChess Cup, scoring 4/9 (+1, -2, =6). Later the same month, he played in the World Rapid and Blitz Team Chess Championships 2026, where his team placed 6th in the Rapid event and reached the final of the Blitz event.

In July, Niemann scored 3/7 in Chennai Grand Masters 2026. Niemann also defeated Anish Giri 9.5-3.5 in an online blitz match on Endgame.ai (+7-1=5).

In August, Niemann played in the 2026 Esports World Cup, qualifying to the quarterfinals through the loser bracket, where he lost 2½–1½ to Alireza Firouzja.

In September, Niemann played on Board 3 for the U.S. team in the Olympiad, scoring 7/11 (+5, -2, =4). The U.S. team placed 4th overall on tiebreaks.

In October, Niemann placed 10th=/12 in the U.S. Chess Championship, scoring 4/11 (+1, -4, =6).

In November, Niemann participated in the Total Chess World Championship 2026. He scored 5.5/9 (+3-1=5) in the Blitz Swiss, which served as a tiebreaker for the group stage. Niemann placed second on tiebreaks in Group D with 16 points and qualified to the second knockout bracket. He defeated Lê Quang Liêm and Jan-Krzysztof Duda in their matches, leading to a 5th place finish.

=== Collaboration with Vladimir Kramnik ===
In September 2023, Niemann defeated former World Champion Vladimir Kramnik in an online game on Chess.com. In a second game, Kramnik deliberately played into a Fool's Mate as black which was seen as a protest and an unspoken cheating accusation. Niemann responded to this by resigning the game. Shortly afterwards Kramnik stated he would not play on Chess.com anymore as there were too many cheaters. Niemann then contacted Kramnik in a bid for reconciliation. In a public message, Niemann expressed admiration for Kramnik and proposed a personal meeting where Kramnik could evaluate and potentially coach him. He also offered financial compensation for the mentorship. In a separate short clip, Niemann called himself “a huge fan” of Kramnik and credited him with shaping many of the modern chess openings.

The two met in Geneva, Switzerland, and subsequently developed a working relationship. Niemann later described Kramnik as his "coach, mentor, and friend" in interviews. Their collaboration was also confirmed by Kramnik in an interview with Chessdom.

In April 2025, the two were seen arriving together at the Grenke Freestyle Chess Open.

== Streaming career ==
Niemann streams chess on Twitch, competing against fellow chess streamers such as Alexandra Botez, Andrew Tang, Hikaru Nakamura, Magnus Carlsen, and formerly Daniel Naroditsky. He first started streaming in the summer of 2018, with activity picking up in 2019. His viewership grew during the COVID-19 pandemic, coinciding with an overall boom in the chess category on Twitch. In 2020, Niemann served as a coach for the inaugural PogChamps tournament. The tournament featured various internet personalities including Fuslie, MoistCr1tikal, xQc, Forsen, Ludwig, and xChocoBars.

== Accolades ==
=== Major tournament wins ===
Year	Tournament	Result	Notes
2020	Texas State Amateur Championship	1st	Score: 6½/7
2021	World Open (Philadelphia)	1st	Won on tiebreaks
2021	U.S. Junior Championship	1st	Qualified for U.S. Championship
2023	Las Vegas Super Swiss (1000GM)	1st	Won on tiebreaks
2023	Uralsk Open	1st	Score: 7½/9
2023	Timișoara Grand Prix Rapid	1st	
2023	Tournament of Peace (GM round robin)	1st	Score: 8/9
2024	Grenke Chess Open	1st	Score: 8/9
2026	Grand Chess Tour: Super Rapid & Blitz Poland	1st	Rapid score: 13/18, Blitz score: 9½/18

== Cheating allegations and lawsuit ==
=== Sinquefield Cup incident ===
In the third round of the 2022 Sinquefield Cup, Niemann defeated then-World Chess Champion Magnus Carlsen with the black pieces, playing the Nimzo-Indian Defence. Niemann's live rating surpassed 2700 for the first time with this win. Carlsen withdrew from the tournament the following day, revealing his decision through a cryptic tweet that included a video of Portuguese football manager José Mourinho saying: "If I speak, I'm in big trouble, and I don't want to be in big trouble."

Although Carlsen did not make any explicit accusations himself, his tweet, coupled with the heightened security measures implemented at the tournament after his defeat, suggested that he was accusing Niemann of cheating. Niemann denied the accusation, and commentators Lawrence Trent and Rustam Kasimdzhanov both expressed doubt that Niemann could have cheated. Meanwhile, grandmaster Hikaru Nakamura pointed to several elements of Niemann's post-match interview that he saw as warranting suspicion. Niemann continued the tournament with four draws and two losses, finishing in seventh place.

Later that month, on September 22, Niemann faced Carlsen again in a much-anticipated game during the Julius Baer Generation Cup. Carlsen resigned the game after one move, further fueling the controversy. Less than a week later, on September 26, Carlsen explicitly accused Niemann of cheating in a statement posted on Twitter. Carlsen stated that he had considered withdrawing from the Sinquefield Cup due to Niemann's last-minute inclusion, that he believed that Niemann had cheated more often and more recently than he had publicly admitted, and that he was convinced by Niemann's behaviour during their Sinquefield Cup game to withdraw from the tournament. He stated that he was limited in what he could say openly without "explicit permission from Niemann," and that he would not play chess with Niemann in the future.

The incident has been characterized as the most serious cheating controversy in international chess since the Toiletgate incident during the World Chess Championship 2006. Many chess players and public figures commented on the controversy, including former world champion Garry Kasparov. Some grandmasters, including Kasparov, have defended Niemann, arguing that Carlsen's loss could be explained by normal play rather than cheating. Kasparov stated that Carlsen's decision to withdraw from the tournament was "unacceptable," adding, "there was no evidence of any wrongdoing [in] the game Magnus lost." He also commented on Carlsen's reaction to the loss, saying, "I understand his frustration and his anger after losing the game and finding other reasons than his own poor play in his game to blame for his loss."

=== Responses and analysis ===
The executive director of the St. Louis Chess Club, Tony Rich, said that no formal complaint was made in writing. Chief Arbiter Chris Bird published a statement affirming there was "no indication that any player has been playing unfairly" during the tournament but did not address the reason for additional security measures added after Carlsen's withdrawal.

Hikaru Nakamura stated that Niemann had previously been suspended from Chess.com for cheating in online tournaments. Niemann admitted in a post-game interview to having cheated in online games when he was 12 and 16 years old, but strongly denied ever cheating in an over-the-board game. He also revealed that Chess.com had suspended him from their site again and prohibited him from competing in future Chess.com events in light of the controversy. Chess.com's chief chess officer, Danny Rensch, confirmed that Niemann would remain suspended pending an explanation of his past cheating on the platform.

A statistical analysis of Niemann's games since 2020 performed by anti-cheating expert Ken Regan that included the Sinquefield Cup game between Carlsen and Niemann found no evidence of cheating. In early October 2022, Chess.com released a report identifying more than 100 games in which he had "likely cheated" on the site, according to an internal measure, some as recently as 2020—when he was 17.

=== Lawsuit ===
On October 20, 2022, Niemann filed a $100 million defamation lawsuit against Carlsen, Chess.com, Play Magnus Group, and Nakamura regarding the cheating claims. The case was filed in the District Court for the Eastern District of Missouri in St. Louis, where the Sinquefield Cup took place. Yale law professor Stephen L. Carter wrote that the case would be "tough to win" based on legal precedents and the difficulty of proving actual malice under US law. By December 7, 2022, all defendants except Play Magnus Group had filed motions to dismiss on various grounds, including lack of jurisdiction and the State of Connecticut's anti-SLAPP laws.

On June 27, 2023, one of Niemann's claims was dismissed by a federal judge. On August 28, Chess.com announced in a blog post that the parties had reached a settlement and that there would be no further litigation. Chess.com reinstated Niemann's account and let him play in future events. Carlsen agreed to play Niemann if paired in the future, stating:

I acknowledge and understand Chess.com’s report, including its statement that there is no determinative evidence that Niemann cheated in his game against me at the Sinquefield Cup.
