= Jakub Seemann =

Polish chess grandmaster (born 2008)

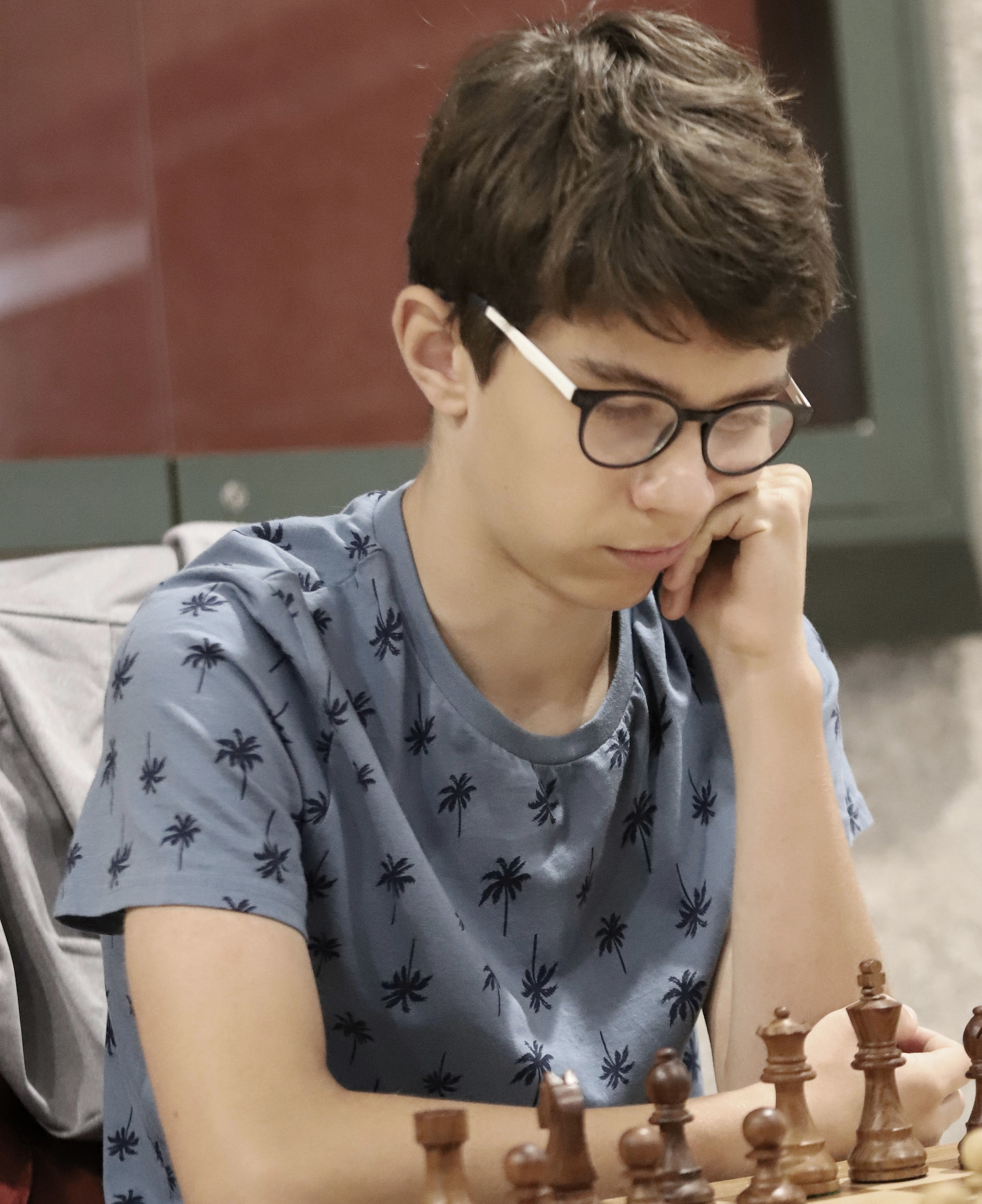
- Seemann in 2021

Personal information
- Born: 11 September 2008 (age 18)

Chess career
- Country: Poland
- Title: Grandmaster (2025)
- FIDE rating: 2512 (October 2026)
- Peak rating: 2557 (July 2026)

Jakub Seemann is a Polish chess grandmaster.

== Chess career ==
In November 2023, he won the U16 section of the World Youth Chess Championship with a score of 9.5/11. He gained 24 rating points and had a performance rating of 2602.

In July 2025, he earned his final GM norm at the Dole Trophy Pasino Grand Aix after making a short 18-move draw against grandmaster Pavel Eljanov. He was awarded the title later in the year.

In October 2025, he tied for first place with Siddharth Jagadeesh, Artiom Stribuk, and Sriram Adarsh Uppala in the U18 section of the World Youth Chess Championship. He was ranked in fourth place after tiebreak scores.
