= Maksim Tsaruk =

Belarusian chess grandmaster (born 2005)

Personal information
- Born: July 10, 2005 (age 21) Svyetlahorsk, Belarus

Chess career
- Country: Belarus (until 2023); FIDE (since 2023)
- Title: Grandmaster (2025)
- FIDE rating: 2479 (November 2026)
- Peak rating: 2515 (October 2025)

Maksim Tsaruk is a Belarusian chess grandmaster.

== Chess career ==
In January 2022, he won the Belarusian Chess Championship with a score of 8/11, half a point ahead of the field.

In June 2024, he finished in second place in the individual rapid chess tournament at the BRICS Games.

In August 2024, he won the U20 open section of the FIDE World School Rapid Chess Championship.

In August 2025, he tied for first place with Denis Lazavik, Arkadij Naiditsch, Zeng Chongsheng, and Aleksey Grebnev at the Abu Dhabi Masters, ultimately being ranked 5th after tiebreaks.
