= Zhamsaran Tsydypov =

Russian chess grandmaster (born 1996)

Personal information
- Born: September 5, 1996 (age 29) Ulan-Ude, Russia

Chess career
- Country: Russia
- Title: Grandmaster (2019)
- FIDE rating: 2525 (July 2026)
- Peak rating: 2573 (June 2019)

Zhamsaran Ayurovich Tsydypov is a Russian chess grandmaster.

== Chess career ==
In May 2017, he finished tied for first place with Alexander Morozevich in the Rashid Nezhmetdinov Rapid Cup. He lost the championship to Morozevich on tiebreaks.

In April 2018, he won a Titled Tuesday tournament hosted on chess.com alongside Sergey Grigoriants and Aram Hakobyan.

In December 2019, he finished in third place at the Rapid Grand Prix Final of Russia, placing behind winner Alexander Morozevich and runner-up Aleksandr Shimanov.

In October 2021, he finished as the runner-up behind tournament winner Sanan Sjugirov in the Russian Rapid Championship.

In October 2023, he won the Russian Blitz Championship, defeating Alexander Grischuk and Boris Savchenko on tiebreaks.
