= Shant Sargsyan =

Armenian chess grandmaster (born 2002)

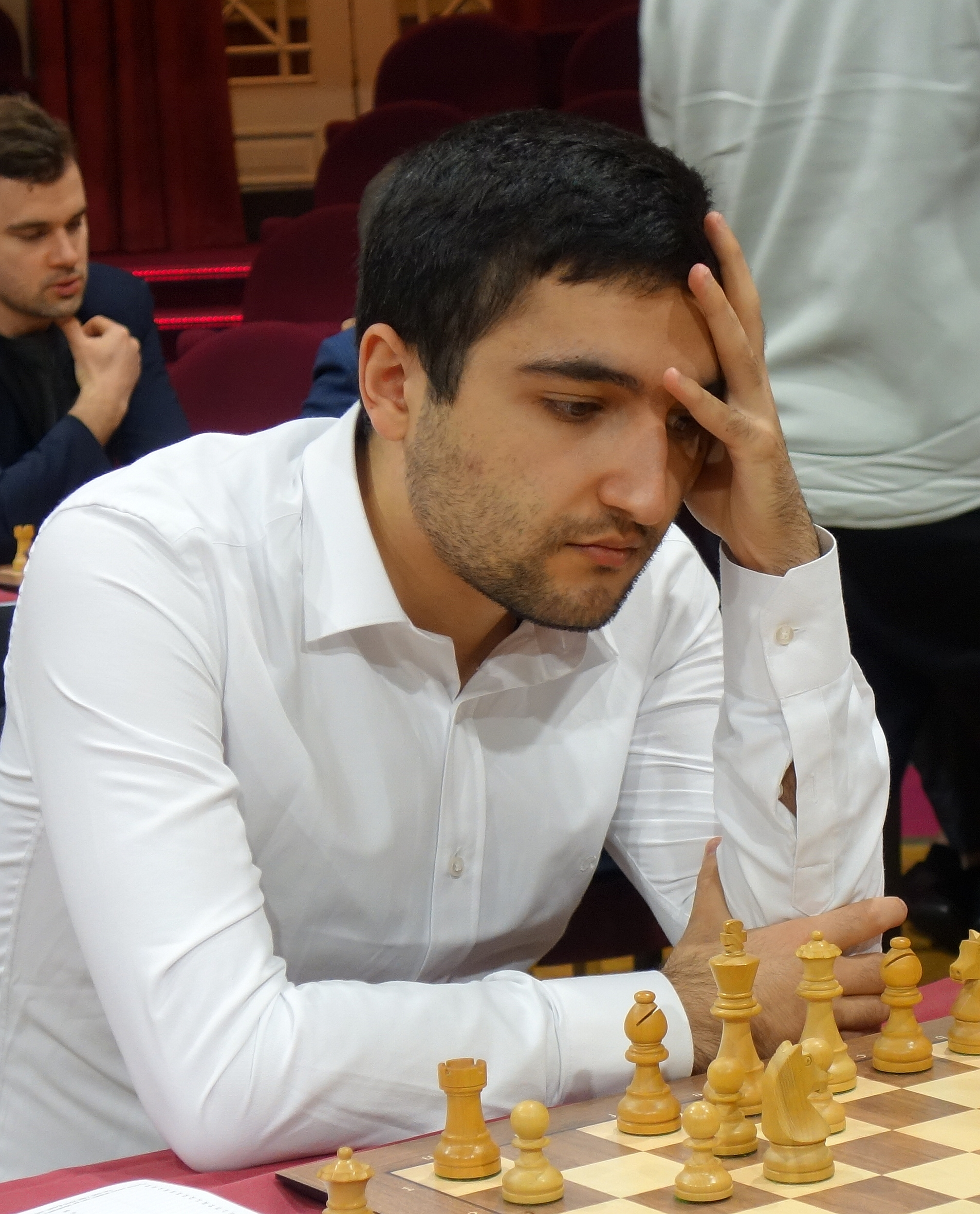
- Shant Sargsyan at FIDE Grand Swiss 2023

Personal information
- Born: 27 January 2002 (age 24) Yerevan, Armenia

Chess career
- Country: Armenia
- Title: Grandmaster (2019)
- FIDE rating: 2630 (September 2026)
- Peak rating: 2669 (June 2025)
- Ranking: No. 95 (September 2026)
- Peak ranking: No. 50 (October 2025)

Shant Sargsyan (Armenian: Շանթ Սարգսյան; born 27 January 2002) is an Armenian chess player. He was awarded the title Grandmaster by FIDE in 2019.

== Career ==
He won the U16 section in the 2018 World Youth Chess Championship.

He came second in the World Youth Chess Championship 2019 in Mumbai, as well as the World Junior Chess Championship 2019 in New Delhi.

== Main results ==
In October 2018, Shant won the World Youth Chess Championship under-16 years old in Porto Carras, scoring 9 out of 11 possible points.

He completed the first Grandmaster norm in January 2018 at the 78th Armenian Championship of the first group held in Yerevan (5½ points out of 10), the second norm in the European Individual Championship held in Batumi in March 2018 (6 points out of 11), and the third norm in the "Aeroflot Open" tournament held in Moscow in February 2019 (4½ points out of 9).

In June 2019, FIDE officially awarded him the title of Grandmaster.

Other significant results:

In August 2019, Shant won the 80th Armenian Group 1 Championship held in Yerevan with 11 points out of 13 possible.

In December 2019, he shared the 1st-3rd places at the Groningen Festival (7 out of 9, 2nd place with additional indicators, losing to Grandmaster Liam Vrolijk).
