= Benjamin Bok =

Dutch chess grandmaster (born 1995)

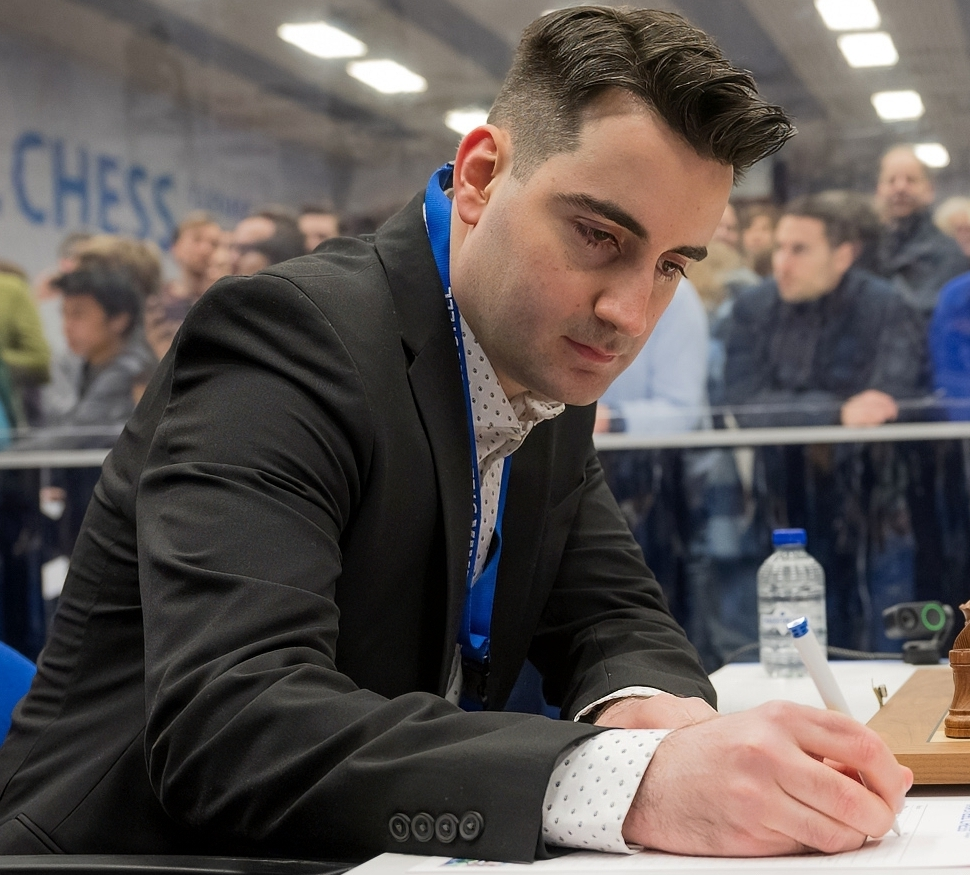
- Bok in 2025

Personal information
- Born: 25 January 1995 (age 31) Lelystad, Netherlands

Chess career
- Country: Netherlands
- Title: Grandmaster (2014)
- FIDE rating: 2560 (July 2026)
- Peak rating: 2645 (July 2019)
- Peak ranking: No. 50 (November 2022)

Twitch information
- Channel: gmbenjaminbok
- Followers: 49,300
- Last updated: November 16, 2024

Benjamin Bok (born 25 January 1995) is a Dutch chess grandmaster. He was awarded the title of Grandmaster by FIDE in 2014.

Bok was born in Lelystad. He studied finance at Saint Louis University in Saint Louis, Missouri, and played on the intercollegiate chess team.

He streams regularly on Twitch and Kick and occasionally provides chess commentary on Hikaru Nakamura's streams.

== Chess career ==
He won the FIDE Open in the 2015 London Chess Classic scoring 8 points out of 9.

In 2016, he debuted for the Dutch national team at the 2016 Chess Olympiad in Baku, Azerbaijan.

In 2017, Bok represented the Netherlands at the 2017 European Team Championship on Crete.

At the Chess World Cup 2019 he defeated Ivan Saric in the first round and was eliminated by Alexander Grischuk in the second round.

As of November 2022, he is the 6th-ranked Dutch chess player, and 184th-ranked player in the world. At his peak, he was the 2nd-ranked Dutch chess player, and 50th-ranked in the world.
