= Sina Movahed =

Iranian chess grandmaster (born 2010)

Personal information
- Born: 27 May 2010 (age 16) Ahvaz, Iran

Chess career
- Country: Iran
- Title: Grandmaster (2024)
- FIDE rating: 2576 (September 2026)
- Peak rating: 2597 (June 2026)

Sina Movahed (Persian: سینا موحد, pronounced [siːˈnɒː movæhˈhed]; born 2010) is an Iranian chess grandmaster.

== Career ==
His first major result was winning the Iran U-8 blitz championship and at the age of 10 entered as the 10th seed of 16 players, he won the 2020 FIDE World Youth Rapid Chess Championships hosted online due to the Covid pandemic. At the age of 13, he was awarded the FIDE Master title after going up almost 300 points since July 2022. In January 2024, he ranked within the top 100 juniors for the first time and became an International Master. In October 2024, he was awarded the Grandmaster title becoming the youngest Iranian Grandmaster. In March 2026, he won his first Chess.com Titled Tuesday tournament beating notable grandmasters, including Magnus Carlsen and Denis Lazavik, along the way.
