= Arjun Erigaisi =

Indian chess grandmaster (born 2003)

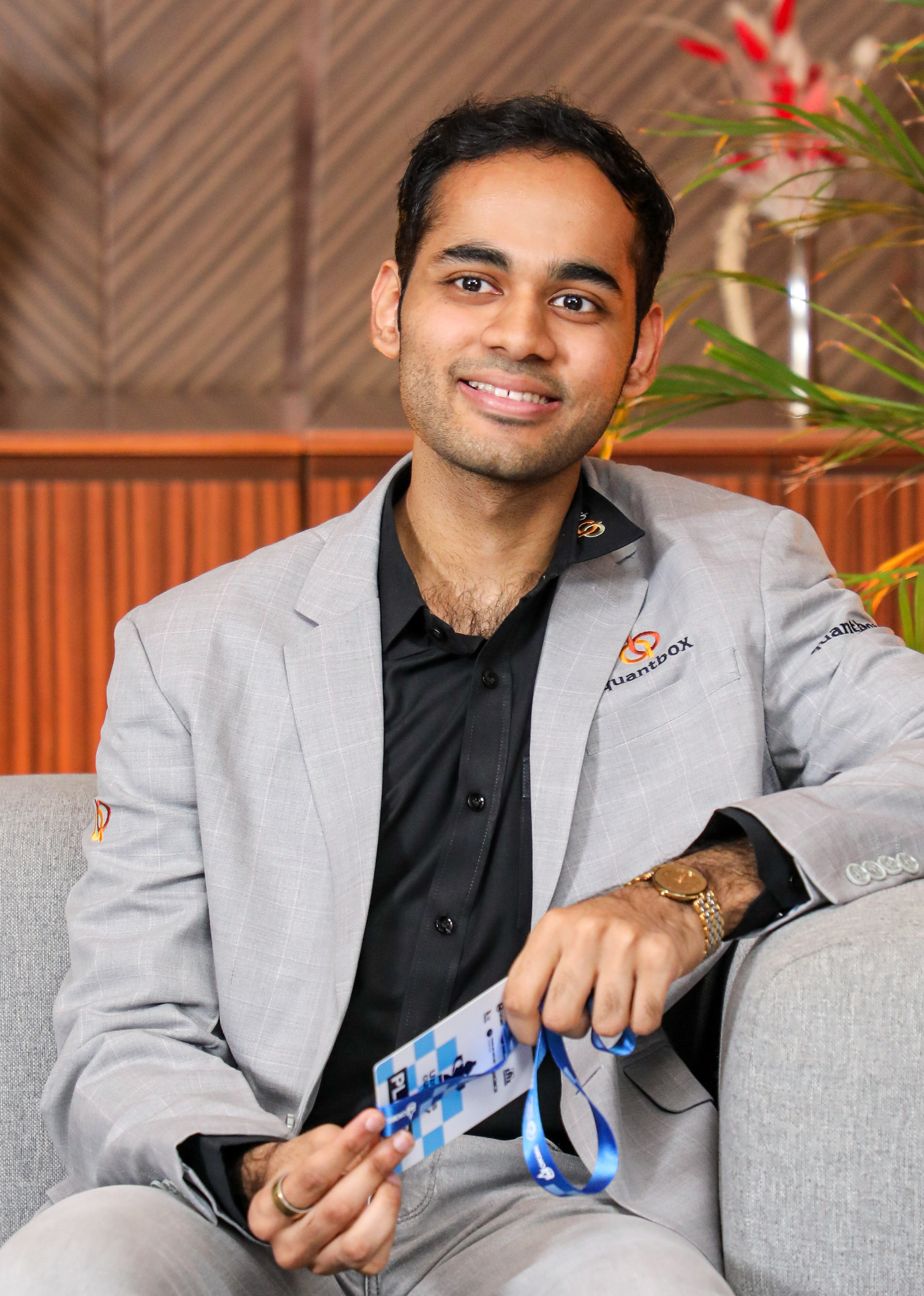
- Erigaisi in 2026

Personal information
- Born: Arjun Kumar Erigaisi; 3 September 2003 (age 23) Warangal, Telangana, India

Chess career
- Country: India
- Title: Grandmaster (2018)
- FIDE rating: 2746 (October 2026)
- Peak rating: 2801 (December 2024)
- Ranking: No. 12 (October 2026)
- Peak ranking: No. 3 (October 2024)

Arjun Kumar Erigaisi (born 3 September 2003) is an Indian chess grandmaster. A chess prodigy, he earned the title of grandmaster at the age of 14 years, 11 months, 13 days. In September 2024, he became India's top rated player, and in December 2024, he achieved his peak rating of 2801, making him the fifteenth-highest rated player in history and second Indian ever to cross the 2800 threshold after Viswanathan Anand. Arjun won the double bronze medal at the FIDE World Rapid & Blitz Championships 2025, becoming the first Indian player to register podium finishes at both events since Viswanathan Anand won the Rapid section and finished third in Blitz in 2017. He has sometimes been described as a 'madman' over the board for his bold and unpredictable style.

== Early life ==
Arjun was born into a Telugu family in Warangal, Telangana. His father is a neurosurgeon and his mother is a housewife.

He began learning chess at the BS Chess Academy in Hanamkonda, under the mentorship of his first coach, Bollam Sampath, who played a key role in shaping his early development in the sport.

He studied data science until December 2021, before deciding to drop out of university during his first year to focus on his chess career.

== Career ==
=== 2015–2018 ===
In 2015, Arjun won a silver medal in the 2015 Asian Youth Championship in Korea.

=== 2021 ===
2021 was a strong year for Arjun Erigaisi, as he became the first Indian to qualify to the Goldmoney Asian Rapid of the Champions Chess Tour 2021 ahead of Alireza Firouzja, Daniil Dubov, Peter Svidler and Vidit Gujrathi, only losing to Levon Aronian in tie breaks in a hard-fought match.

In October 2021, Arjun placed 2nd at the Junior U21 Round Table Open Chess Championship (Classical) held in Bulgaria. He scored 7/9, along with Alexey Sarana.

In November 2021, Arjun placed 3rd out of 82 players in the Lindores Abbey Blitz Tournament at Riga ahead of players such as Maxime Vachier-Lagrave, Levon Aronian, David Navara, Daniil Dubov, Peter Svidler and many others.

Later that month, Arjun won the Tata Steel Chess India 2021 Rapid Open in Kolkata. He scored 6½/9, ahead of Vidit Gujrathi, Levon Aronian, Sam Shankland and Lê Quang Liêm. He clinched the win by holding Levon Aronian to a draw in a losing position.

=== 2022 ===
In January 2022, Arjun won the Tata Steel Chess 2022 Challengers, qualifying him to play in the masters section in the next Tata Steel Chess tournament. His final score was 10½/13 and his TPR in the tournament was 2804, taking his rating to 2660, thereby breaking into the top 100.

In March 2022, he was crowned the Indian National Champion by winning the 58th MPL National Championship of India 2022 with a score of 8½/11. Furthermore, in March Arjun won the 19th Delhi Open, edging out Gukesh Dommaraju and Harsha Bharathakoti on tie-break after all scored 8½/10.

Between July and August 2022, Arjun played as board 3 for the India-1 team at the Chess Olympiad. He finished with a score of 8½/11 (+6−0=5), with the team finishing in 4th overall. In August 2022, Arjun won the 28th Abu Dhabi International Chess Festival with 7½/9 and a performance rating of 2893.

In December 2022, Arjun won the Tata Steel Chess India 2022 Blitz Open in Kolkata with 12½/18, which was his third victory in Tata Steel events to date.

=== 2024 ===
In April 2024, Arjun won Menorca Open A on superior tie-break score after he tied with 2 others with a score of 7½/9.

In June 2024, Arjun won the Stepan Avagyan Memorial 2024 in Jermuk with a round to spare.

In September, Erigaisi was part of the Indian team that won gold medal in the open section of the 45th Chess Olympiad. He was the only player in the Open section to score six straight wins in the first six rounds. He finished the event with 10 points in 11 rounds (+9−0=2), the highest score in the event. His performance rating of 2968 earned him the individual gold on board three, and helped India win their first ever team gold medal at the Chess Olympiad.

In October 2024, Arjun won the 2024 WR Chess Masters Cup in London by defeating Maxime Vachier-Lagrave in an armageddon tiebreak in the final.

In December 2024, Arjun crossed 2800 on the FIDE Ratings list, making him the 16th player ever in history to cross the mark.

Arjun finished 2nd on 2024 FIDE Circuit, with 124.40 points just 6.02 points behind Winner Fabiano Caruana. A win in the final round of Qatar Masters 2024 against eventual 1st place Andrey Esipenko would have given him the required points, once again narrowly missing the Candidates spot.

=== 2025 ===
In Tata Steel Chess Tournament 2025, he finished 10th, scoring 5½/13 (+2−4=7). Between 28 February and 14 March, Arjun managed to win all of the three Chess.com Freestyle Friday events held. He is the first Indian to win the event and the first player to win it three consecutive times. He was part of the Team MGD1 that won the World Rapid Team Chess Championship in London in June 2025.

In July–August, Arjun competed in the 2025 Esports World Cup – Chess (having qualified via the Champions Chess Tour 2025) in Riyadh, representing Gen.G Esports. He finished fourth, losing to Alireza Firouzja in the semifinal and to Hikaru Nakamura in the third-place playoff, earning $115,000.

In October–November, Arjun participated in the Chess World Cup 2025. In the tournament, he knocked out Martin Petrov in the second round, Shamsiddin Vokhidov in the third round, Peter Leko in the fourth round, and Levon Aronian in the fifth round. He was eliminated in the quarterfinals by Wei Yi.

In December, Arjun won the double bronze medal at the FIDE World Rapid & Blitz Championships 2025. In Rapid he finished third on tiebreak to win the bronze medal. In Blitz he finished as the sole leader at the Swiss stage but lost in the semifinal to win the bronze medal.

=== 2026 ===
Starting in January and ending in February, Arjun participated in the Tata Steel Chess Tournament 2026. He finished tied for 12th place with a score of 4.5/13, but came in 13th after Sonneborn-Berger tiebreaks.

In May, at the 2026 TePe Sigeman Chess Tournament, Arjun tied for first place with Magnus Carlsen, but lost 2–1 in blitz tiebreaks to finish runner-up.

In June, Arjun participated in UzChess Cup, He scored 5 (+2-1=6) points to tie for 3rd place alongside Ian Nepomniachtchi and Shakhriyar Mamedyarov, He then led Team MGD1 to a silver in the Rapid Section of World Rapid and Blitz Team Chess Championships 2026, He won individual silver for board 1.

In July, Erigaisi finished 3rd (+2-1=4) at Chennai Grand Masters, ½ point behind winner Alireza Firouzja and tied on 4 points alongside Dmitry Andreikin, though with worse tiebreaks.

In August, Arjun represented Gen.G Esports at the 2026 Esports World Cup – Chess (having qualified via the Champions Chess Tour 2025–2026) in Paris. He was eliminated in the quarterfinals by Hikaru Nakamura.

== Awards and recognition ==
=== Others ===
- Sportstar Emerging Hero Award: 2023
- TOISA Chess Player of the Year: 2021

== See also ==
- Chess in India
- List of Indian chess players
- List of chess grandmasters

Achievements
Preceded by Chithambaram Aravindh	Indian Chess Champion; 2022	Succeeded by Karthik Venkataraman
