= Alexey Sarana =

Russian-Serbian chess grandmaster (born 2000)

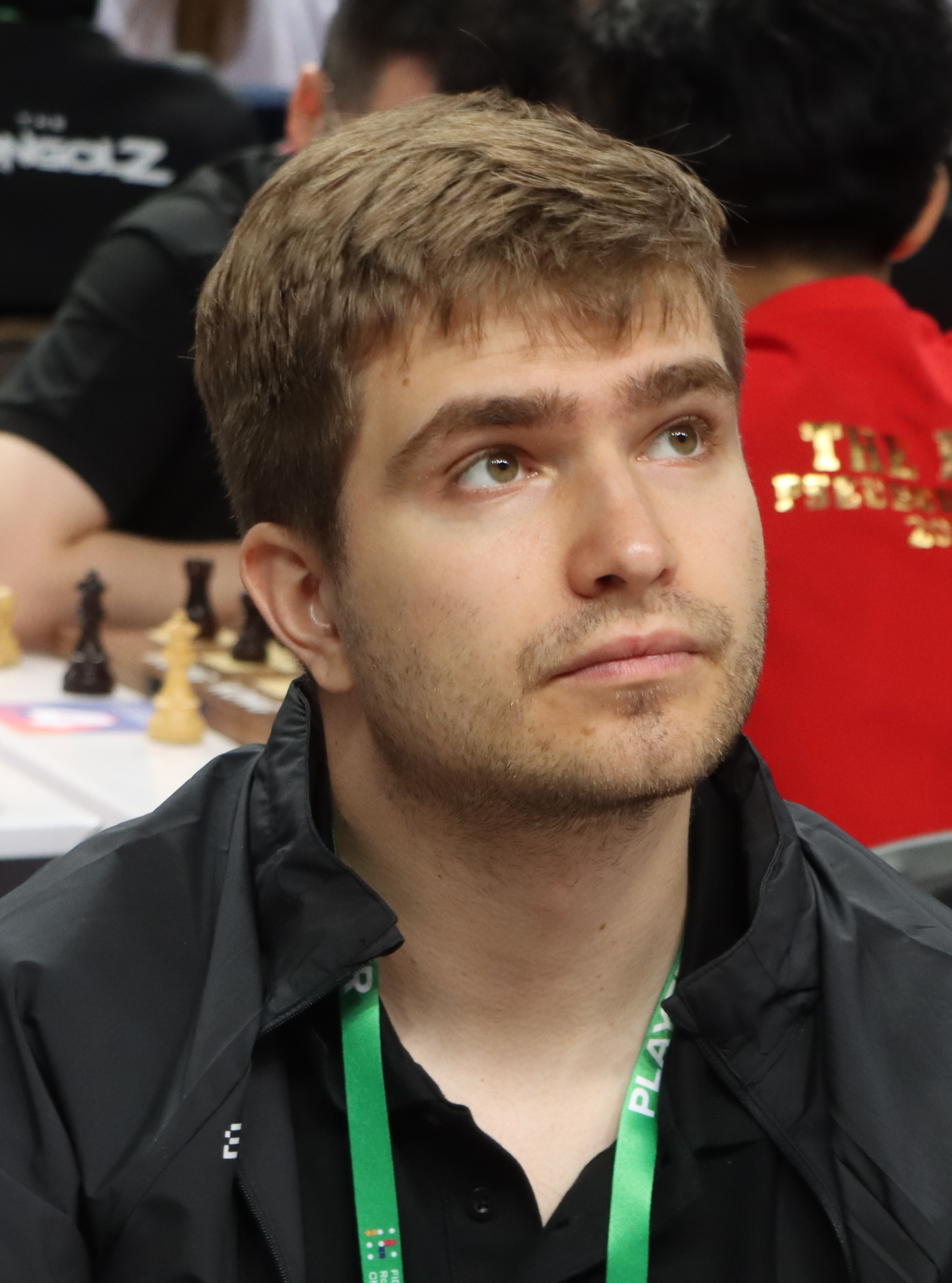
- Sarana in 2026

Personal information
- Born: 26 January 2000 (age 26) Moscow, Russia

Chess career
- Country: Russia (until April 2023); Serbia (since April 2023)
- Title: Grandmaster (2017)
- FIDE rating: 2664 (July 2026)
- Peak rating: 2717 (July 2024)
- Ranking: No. 52 (July 2026)
- Peak ranking: No. 24 (August 2024)

Alexey Vasilyevich Sarana (Note: Russian: Алексей Васильевич Сарана Serbian Cyrillic: Алексеј Васиљевич Сарана) (Russian: Алексей Васильевич Сарана, born 26 January 2000) is a Russian chess grandmaster playing for Serbia. He won the European Individual Chess Championship in 2023.

His father is Ukrainian and lives near Kyiv. Sarana left Russia in March 2022, stating that he does not plan to return until the end of the Russian invasion of Ukraine.

== Chess career ==
Born in 2000, Sarana earned his international master title in 2016 and his grandmaster title in 2017. In February 2018, he participated in the Aeroflot Open. He finished forty-ninth out of ninety-two, scoring 4½/9 (+1–1=7). In March 2018, he competed in the European Individual Chess Championship. He placed twenty-second, scoring 7½/11 (+4–0=7). In July 2019, Sarana won the Russian Championship Higher League with a score of 6½/9 (+4–0=5), qualifying for the Superfinals of 71st Russian men's Chess championship. In the Superfinal, he finished 9th with a score of 5/11(+1-2=8).

In 2019, Sarana shared first place with Alexandr Predke in the Russian Championship Higher League (second on tiebreak) with a score of 6½/9 (+4–0=5). With this result he qualified for the Superfinals of the Russian men's Chess championship for the second year in a row. In 2023 he won the European Individual Chess Championship. He also won gold for Serbia in an online chess competition held at the 2023 Olympic Esports Week.

In the Chess World Cup 2023, Sarana reached the round of 16 by defeating 6th seed Wesley So in the fourth round.
