= Denis Lazavik =

Belarusian chess grandmaster (born 2006)

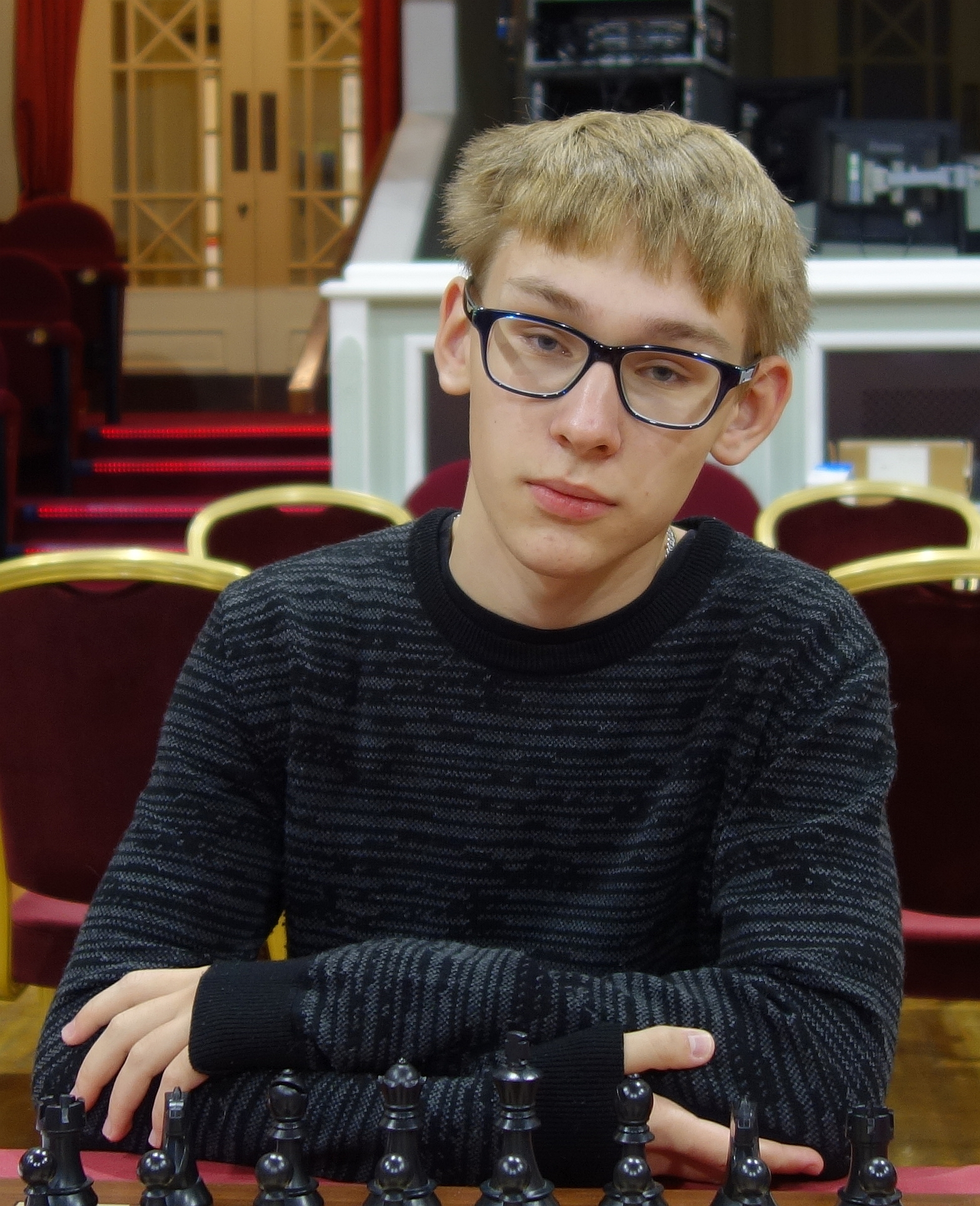
- Lazavik in 2023

Personal information
- Born: 17 November 2006 (age 19) Minsk, Belarus

Chess career
- Country: Belarus
- Title: Grandmaster (2022)
- FIDE rating: 2636 (October 2026)
- Peak rating: 2636 (October 2026)
- Ranking: No. 85 (October 2026)
- Peak ranking: No. 85 (October 2026)

Denis Lazavik (Note: Belarusian: Дзяніс Лазавік; Russian: Денис Лазавик.) (born 17 November 2006) is a Belarusian chess grandmaster.

== Chess career ==
Lazavik was born in Minsk on 17 November 2006.

In December 2018, Lazavik was part of the Belarus team (alongside Vyacheslav Zarubitsky, Olga Badelka, Maksim Tsaruk and Artyom Sinyavsky) in the World Youth Chess Olympiad.

In November 2019, Lazavik again represented Belarus (alongside Maksim Tsaruk, Ivan Runets, Artsiom Siniauski, and Aliaksandra Tarasenka) in the World Youth Chess Olympiad. The team finished 3rd, behind Azerbaijan and Uzbekistan.

Lazavik earned his IM title in 2021 and his GM title in 2022.

In December 2022, Lazavik competed in the World Rapid and Blitz Chess Championships. He finished 16th in the Blitz tournament and 42nd in the Rapid tournament.

In January 2023, Lazavik won a Chess.com-hosted Titled Tuesday tournament by defeating Jeffery Xiong in the tiebreaks.

In July 2023, Lazavik won Division II of the Aimchess Rapid tournament of the Champions Chess Tour 2023 by defeating Sam Sevian.

Lazavik competed in the FIDE Grand Swiss Tournament 2023. He got his only win of the event in the final round against Sandro Mareco. He finished 80th out of 114 players, with a score of 5/11 (+1-2=8).

In August 2025, Lazavik won the Masters tournament at the 31st Abu Dhabi International Chess Festival with a score of 7/9 (+5-0=4).

In February 2026, Lazavik came third in the Speed Chess Championship after losing to Magnus Carlsen in the semifinals and beating Hikaru Nakamura in the consolation match. While it was the 2025 edition of the tournament, the semifinals and finals were held in 2026. This result qualified him for the 2026 Esports World Cup.

In April 2026, Lazavik won the Karpov International Chess Tournament in Khanty-Mansiysk, with a score of 6/9 (+3-0=6).
