= Chess career of Magnus Carlsen =

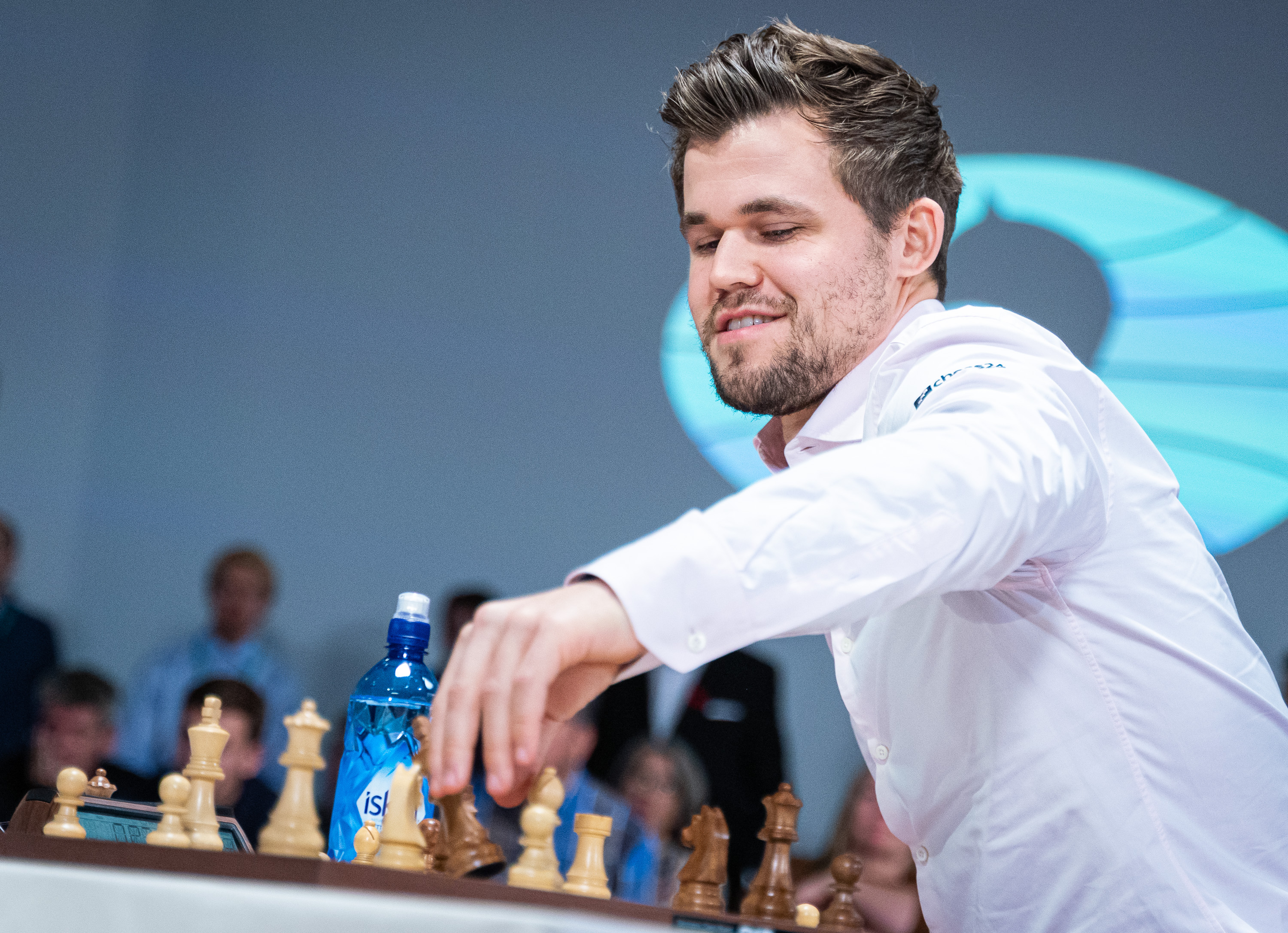
Carlsen in 2019 at the FIDE World Fischer Random Chess Championship

Magnus Carlsen (born 30 November 1990) is a Norwegian chess grandmaster who currently holds the No. 1 position in FIDE rankings. He played in his first tournament at eight years old in 1999, and was awarded the title of grandmaster at age 13 in 2004. He was the reigning World Chess Champion from 2013 until 2023, when he declined to defend his title.

== 2004 ==
Carlsen vs. Ernst, 2004

Position: d8 black rook, f8 black rook, g8 black king, a7 black pawn, b7 black pawn, e7 black bishop, f7 black pawn, g7 black pawn, e6 black pawn, f6 black knight, h6 black pawn, a5 black queen, c5 black pawn, e5 white knight, h5 white pawn, d4 white pawn, f4 white bishop, a2 white pawn, b2 white pawn, c2 white pawn, e2 white queen, f2 white pawn, g2 white pawn, b1 white king, d1 white rook, h1 white rook

Position after 17...c5. The game continued 18.Ng6 fxg6 19.Qxe6+ Kh8 20.hxg6 Ng8 21.Bxh6 gxh6 22.Rxh6+ Nxh6 23.Qxe7 Nf7 24.gxf7 Kg7 25.Rd3 Rd6 26.Rg3+ Rg6 27.Qe5+ Kxf7 28.Qf5+ Rf6 29.Qd7#

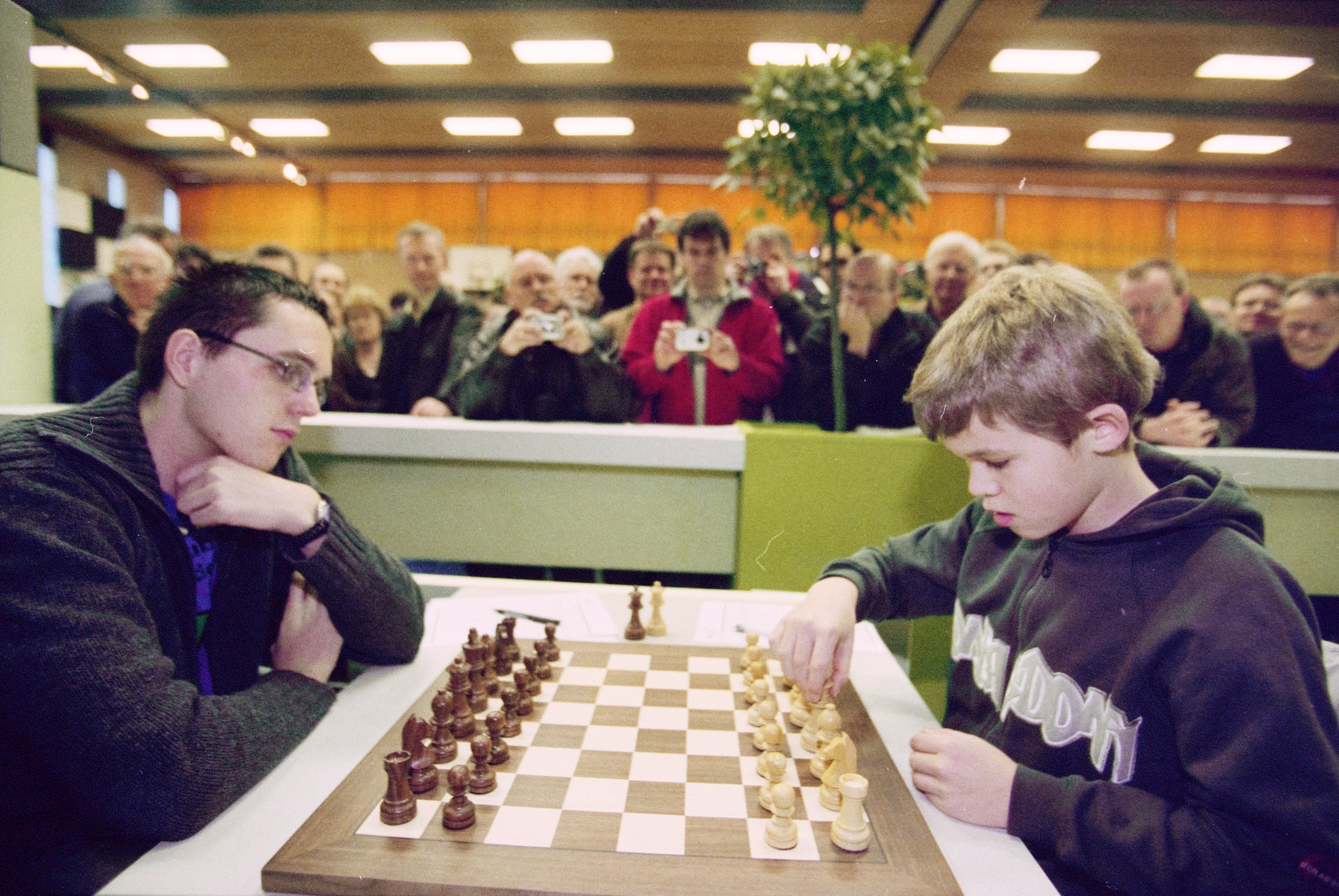
Carlsen vs. Ernst, 2004

At age 13, Carlsen made headlines after his victory in the C group of the Corus Chess Tournament 2004 at Wijk aan Zee. He obtained a score of 10½/13, losing just one game to the section's top seed, Duško Pavasovič. As a result, he earned his first GM norm, and achieved a PR of 2702. Particularly notable was his win over Sipke Ernst in the penultimate round, when he sacrificed material to give mate in just 29 moves. His victory in the C group qualified him to play in the B group in 2005, and it led Lubomir Kavalek, writing for the Washington Post, to give him the sobriquet "the Mozart of chess", which had been given to many illustrious predecessors. Agdestein said that Carlsen had an excellent memory and played an unusually wide range of openings. Carlsen's prowess caught the attention of Microsoft, which became his sponsor.

Carlsen obtained his second GM norm at the Moscow Aeroflot Open in February. On 17 March, in a blitz chess tournament in Reykjavík, Iceland, he defeated former World Champion Anatoly Karpov. It was a preliminary event leading up to a rapid knockout tournament beginning the next day. In that event, Carlsen was paired with Garry Kasparov, then the top-rated player in the world. Carlsen achieved a draw in their first game but lost the second, and was thus knocked out of the tournament.

In the sixth Dubai Open Chess Championship, held 18–28 April, Carlsen obtained his third GM norm, which made him the world's youngest GM at the time, and the second-youngest GM in history at the time (after Sergey Karjakin, who earned the title at 12 years and 7 months). Carlsen played in the FIDE World Chess Championship, becoming the youngest player ever to participate in one, but was knocked out in the first round by Levon Aronian.

In July, Carlsen and Berge Østenstad, then the reigning Norwegian champion, tied for first in the Norwegian Chess Championship, each scoring 7/9. A two-game match between them was arranged to decide the title. Both games were drawn, which left Østenstad the champion due to his superior tiebreaks.

== 2005 ==
In January, Carlsen scored 7/13 (+3–2=8) in the B group at Corus 2005 at Wijk aan Zee. In the Smartfish Chess Masters event at the Drammen International Chess Festival 2004–05, Carlsen defeated World No. 10 and eventual co-winner Alexei Shirov. In the semi-finals of the Ciudad de León rapid chess tournament in June, Carlsen played a four-game match against reigning World Rapid Champion and World No. 2 Viswanathan Anand, losing 3–1.

In the Norwegian Chess Championship, Carlsen again finished in shared first place, this time with his mentor Simen Agdestein. A playoff between them was played between 7 and 10 November. This time, the rule giving the title to the player with better tiebreak scores in the event of a 1–1 tie had been revoked. Agdestein won the first game, and Carlsen struck back in the second, so it went into a series of two-game rapid matches. Carlsen won the first rapid game, Agdestein the second. Then followed three draws until Agdestein won the title with a victory in the sixth rapid game.

In October, Carlsen took first place at the Arnold Eikrem Memorial in Gausdal with a score of 8/9 and a PR of 2792.

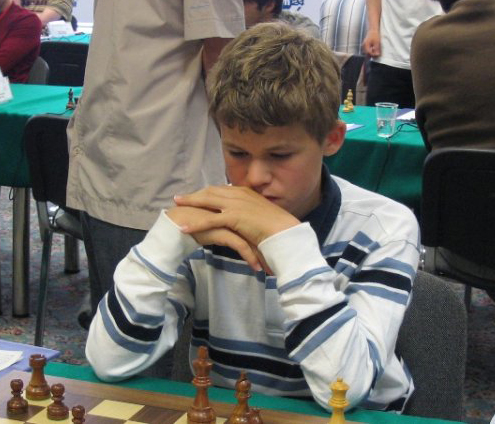
Carlsen in Warsaw, 2005

At the end of 2005, Carlsen participated in the Chess World Cup in Khanty-Mansiysk, Russia. In the knockout tournament, he upset 44th-ranked Zurab Azmaiparashvili in round one, and proceeded to defeat Farrukh Amonatov and Ivan Cheparinov to reach the round of 16. There he lost to Evgeny Bareev, but won against Joël Lautier and Vladimir Malakhov before losing again to Gata Kamsky. Carlsen finished in tenth place and became the youngest player to be an official World Championship Candidate. (Note: This record is extremely misleading: the Candidates tournament that Carlsen qualified for was a 16-player tournament where the top four finishers advanced to the 8-player 2007 World Championship tournament. The previous record-holder, Bobby Fischer, qualified for an 8-player Candidates tournament (1959), where the winner would become the challenger for the World Championship match.)

== 2006 ==
In the B group at the Corus 2006, Carlsen scored 9/13 (+6−1=6), which shared first place with Alexander Motylev. As a result, Carlsen qualified to play in the Corus group A in 2007. At the 2006 international 'Bosna' tournament in Sarajevo, Carlsen shared first place with Liviu-Dieter Nisipeanu (who won on tiebreak) and Vladimir Malakhov; this could be regarded as Carlsen's first "A" elite tournament win, although it was not a clear first.

Carlsen was close to winning the 2006 Norwegian Chess Championship outright, but a last-round loss to Berge Østenstad dropped him into another tie for first place with Agdestein. It also prevented Carlsen from beating Agdestein's record as the youngest Norwegian champion ever. Nonetheless, in the playoff held from 19 to 21 September, after two draws at standard time controls, Carlsen won both rapid games in round two to secure his first Norwegian championship title.

Carlsen won the Glitnir Blitz Tournament in Iceland. He achieved a 2–0 win over Vishy Anand in the semi-finals and achieved the same score in the finals. He scored 6/8 in the 37th Chess Olympiad and achieved a PR of 2820. In the Midnight Sun Chess Tournament in Tromsø, Carlsen finished second to Sergei Shipov. In the Biel Grandmaster Tournament, he placed second, beating the tournament winner Alexander Morozevich twice.

In the NH Chess Tournament held in Amsterdam in August, Carlsen participated in an "Experience" vs. "Rising Stars" Scheveningen team match. The "Rising Stars" won the match 28–22, with Carlsen achieving the best individual score for the Rising Stars team (6½/10) and a 2700 PR, thus winning the right to participate in the 2007 Melody Amber tournament.

With a score of 7½/15, Carlsen placed 8th out of 16 participants at the World Blitz Championship in Rishon LeZion, Israel. In the rapid chess tournament Rencontres nationales et internationales d'échecs in Cap d'Agde, France, he reached the semi-final, losing there to Sergey Karjakin. In November, Carlsen achieved a shared 8th place of 10 participants in the Mikhail Tal Memorial in Moscow with two losses and seven draws. He finished ninth in a group of 18 participants in the associated blitz tournament, which was won by Anand.

== 2007 ==
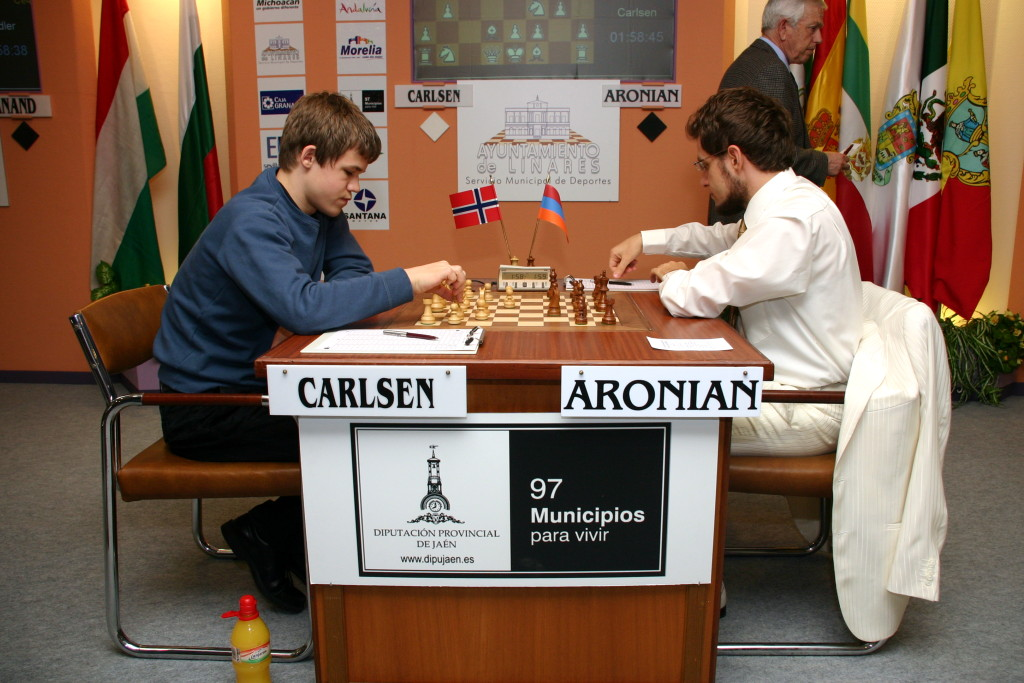
Carlsen playing Levon Aronian at Linares 2007

Playing in the top group of the Corus chess tournament for the first time, Carlsen placed last with nine draws and four losses, scoring 4½/13. In the Linares chess tournament, Carlsen faced elite opposition and was the lowest-rated player by a large margin. Despite this, he tied for second place with 7½/14 (+4−3=7), with wins over Alexander Morozevich, Vasyl Ivanchuk (twice), and Veselin Topalov, and a PR of 2778.

In March, Carlsen played in his first Melody Amber blind and rapid chess tournament in Monte Carlo. In the blindfold portion, he achieved a winless score of 4/11 (+0–3=8) to finish in shared ninth place. In the rapid portion, he finished 6½/11 (+3–1=7) for shared second place. Overall, he finished in shared eighth place.

In May and June, he participated in the Candidates Tournament for the FIDE World Chess Championship 2007, facing Levon Aronian in a six-game match at standard time controls, which Carlsen drew (+2−2=2) by coming from behind twice. The four-game rapid playoff was drawn as well (+1−1=2), with Carlsen winning the last game to stay in the match. Eventually, Aronian eliminated Carlsen from the tournament after winning both tiebreak blitz games.

In July and August, Carlsen won the Biel Grandmaster Tournament with a 6/10 record and a PR of 2753. His score was matched by Alexander Onischuk and they played a match to break the tie. After drawing two rapid and two blitz games, Carlsen won the armageddon game. Immediately after the Biel tournament, Carlsen entered the open Arctic Chess Challenge in Tromsø, but his fourth-place result with +5=4 was a slight underperformance in terms of rating. A game which attracted some attention was his sixth-round win over his father, Henrik Carlsen.

Carlsen reached the semi-final round of the World Chess Cup in December, after defeating Michael Adams in the round of 16 and Ivan Cheparinov in the quarterfinals. In the semi-final, he was eliminated by eventual winner, Gata Kamsky 1½–½.

== 2008 ==
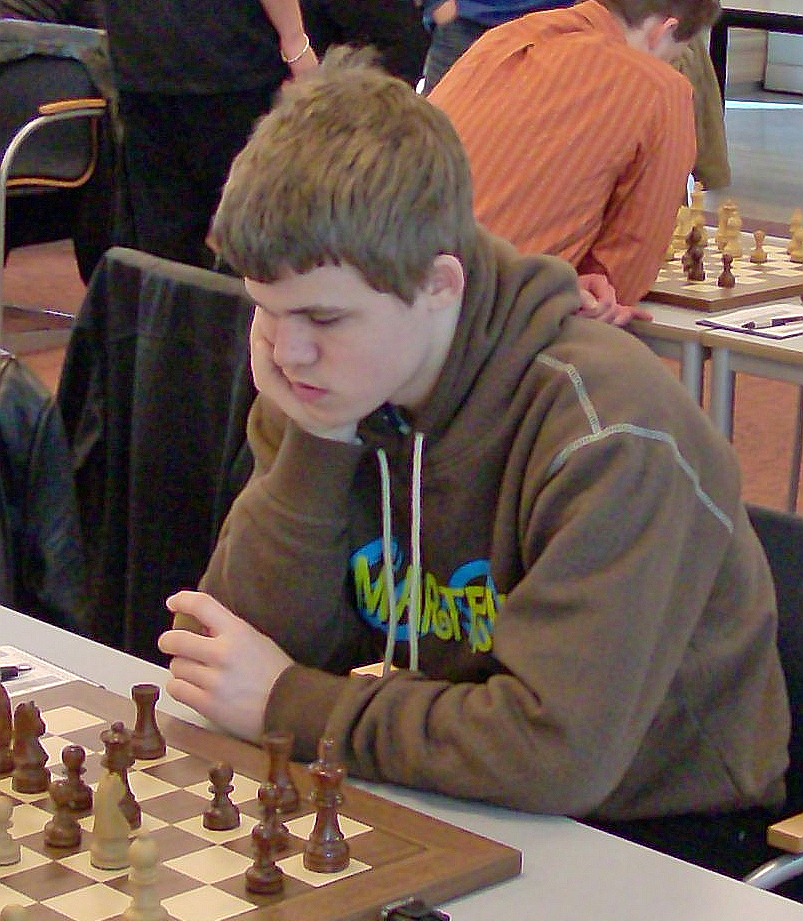
Carlsen in 2008

In the top group A of the 69th Corus chess tournament, Carlsen scored 8/13, achieving a PR of 2830. Carlsen won five games, lost two and drew six, sharing first place with Levon Aronian. At the Linares chess tournament, Carlsen had another 2800+ PR, scoring 8/14. He finished in sole second place, half a point behind the winner World Champion Vishy Anand.

In March, Carlsen played for the second time in the Melody Amber blind and rapid chess tournament, held in Nice for the first time. In the 11 rounds, he achieved four wins, four draws and two losses in the blindfold, and three wins, two losses, and six draws in the rapid. This resulted in a shared fifth place in the blindfold, shared third place in the rapid and a shared second place in the overall tournament.

Carlsen was one of 21 players in the six-tournament FIDE Grand Prix 2008–2010, a qualifier for the World Chess Championship 2012. In the first tournament, in Baku, Azerbaijan, he finished in a three-way tie for first place, with another 2800 PR. He later withdrew from the Grand Prix cycle despite his initial success, criticising FIDE for "changing the rules dramatically in the middle of a World Championship cycle".

Carlsen won a rapid match against Peter Leko held in Miskolc, Hungary, scoring 5–3. In June, Carlsen won the annual Aerosvit chess tournament, finishing undefeated with 8/11 in a category 19 field and achieving a PR of 2877, his best PR at that point in his career. Playing in the category 18 Biel Grandmaster Tournament, Carlsen finished third with 6/10, with a PR of 2740.

In the Mainz World Rapid Chess Championship, Carlsen finished in second place after losing the final to defending champion Anand 3–1. In the qualification round Carlsen scored 1½–½ against Judit Polgár, 1–1 against Anand and 1–1 against Alexander Morozevich. In the category 22 Bilbao Masters, Carlsen tied for second with a 2768 PR.

== 2009 ==
Playing in Group A of the 71st Corus chess tournament, Carlsen tied for fifth with a 2739 PR. In the Linares chess tournament, he finished third with a 2777 PR. He tied for second place with Veselin Topalov at the M-Tel Masters (category 21) tournament in Sofia, Bulgaria. He lost to eventual winner Alexei Shirov in their final game, dropping him from first.

Carlsen won the category 21 Nanjing Pearl Spring tournament, 2½ points ahead of second-place finisher Topalov, the world's highest-rated player at the time. He scored an undefeated 8/10, winning every game as white (against Topalov, Wang Yue, Peter Leko, Teimour Radjabov, and Dmitry Jakovenko), and also winning as black against Jakovenko. By rating performance, this was one of the greatest results in history, with a PR of 3002. Chess statistician Jeff Sonas has declared it one of the 20 best tournament performances of all time, and the best chess performance of all time by a teenager. As a result, Carlsen became the youngest ever player at the time to pass 2800 in rating.

In the Tal Memorial, played from 5 to 14 November, Carlsen started with seven straight draws, but finished with wins over former FIDE World Champion Ruslan Ponomariov and Leko. This result put Carlsen in shared second place behind former World Champion Vladimir Kramnik and equal with Ivanchuk. After the Tal Memorial, Carlsen won the World Blitz Championship, played from 16 to 18 November in Moscow, Russia. His score of 31/42 (+28–8=6) left him three points ahead of runner-up Anand.

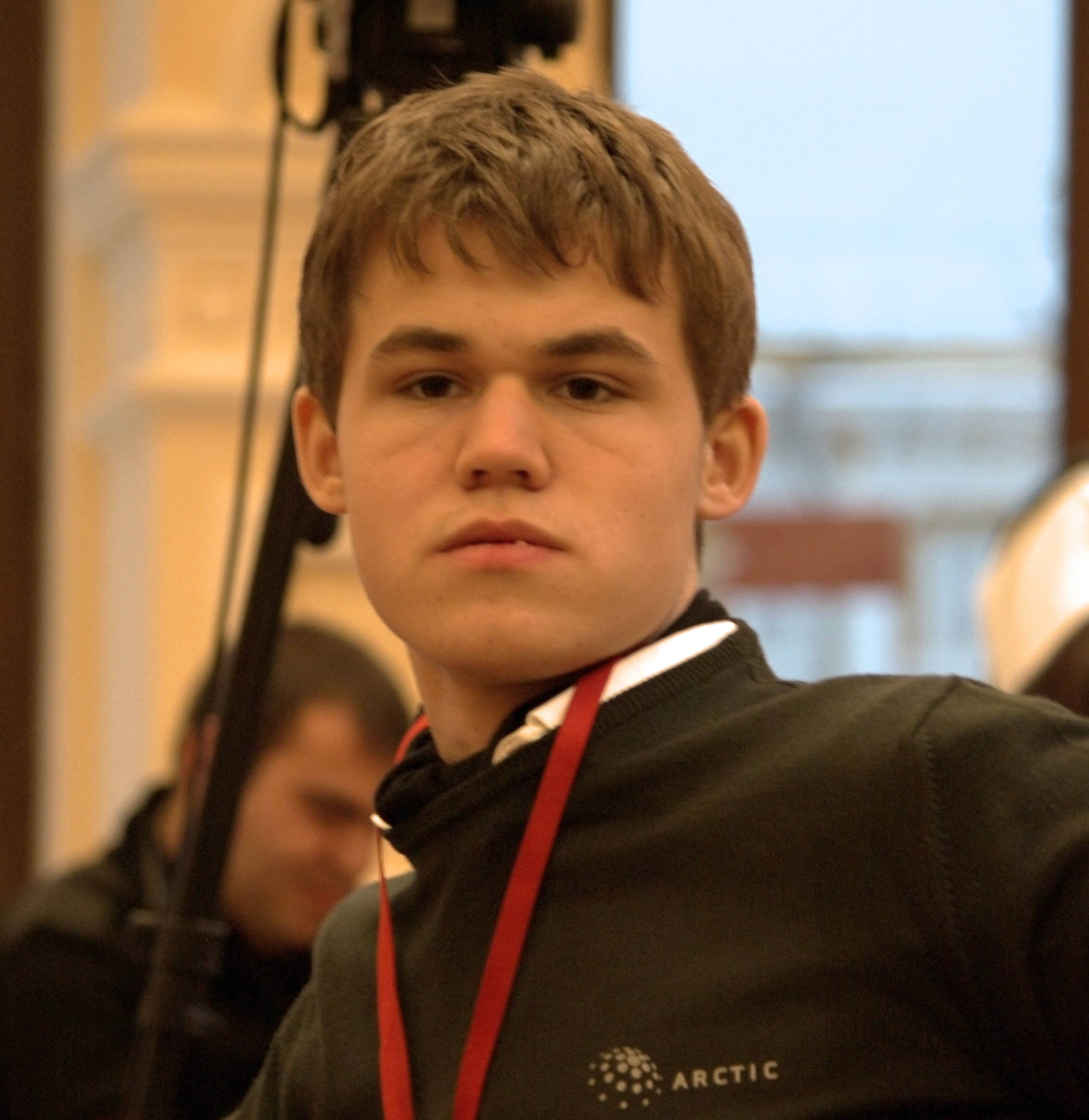
Carlsen at the World Blitz Championship 2009

Carlsen entered the London Chess Classic as the top seed in a field including Kramnik, Hikaru Nakamura, Michael Adams, Nigel Short, Ni Hua, Luke McShane and David Howell. He defeated Kramnik in round one and went on to win the tournament with 13/21 (three points were awarded for a win, and one for a draw; using classical scoring, he finished with 5/7) and a PR of 2844, one point ahead of Kramnik. This victory propelled him to No. 1 of the FIDE rating list, surpassing Veselin Topalov.

Based on his average ranking from the July 2009 and January 2010 FIDE lists, Carlsen qualified for the Candidates Tournament that would determine the challenger to World Champion Vishy Anand in the World Chess Championship 2012. In November 2010, however, Carlsen announced he was withdrawing from the Candidates Tournament. Carlsen described the 2008–12 cycle as "[not] sufficiently modern and fair", and wrote that "Reigning champion privileges, the long (five-year) span of the cycle, changes made during the cycle resulting in a new format (Candidates) that no World Champion has had to go through since Kasparov, puzzling ranking criteria as well as the shallow ceaseless match-after-match concept are all less than satisfactory in my opinion."

In early 2009, Carlsen hired former World Champion Garry Kasparov as a personal trainer. In September their partnership was revealed to the public by Norwegian newspapers.

== 2010 ==
Carlsen won the 72nd Corus chess tournament played 16–31 January with 8½ points. His ninth-round loss to Kramnik ended a streak of 36 rated games undefeated. Carlsen struggled in the last round against Fabiano Caruana, but saved a draw, leaving him half a point ahead of Kramnik and Shirov.

In March it was announced that Carlsen had split from Kasparov and would no longer use him as a trainer, although Carlsen later stated that they would remain in contact and he would continue to attend training sessions with Kasparov.

Carlsen shared first place alongside Ivanchuk in the Amber blindfold and rapid tournament. Scoring 6½/11 in the blindfold and 8/11 in the rapid, Carlsen accumulated 14½ from a possible 22 points. Carlsen helped Vishy Anand prepare for the World Championship 2010 against Veselin Topalov, which Anand won 6½–5½ to retain the title. Carlsen had earlier helped Anand prepare for his World Championships in 2007 and 2008.

Carlsen won the Bazna Kings Tournament in Romania in June, two points ahead of Teimour Radjabov and Boris Gelfand. In August, Carlsen played in the Arctic Securities Chess Stars tournament in Kristiansund, Norway., defeating Anand 1½–½ in the two-game final to win the championship.

Carlsen suffered setbacks in his next two tournaments. In the 39th Chess Olympiad he scored 4½/8, losing three games, to Baadur Jobava, Michael Adams, and Sanan Sjugirov; these were his first losses with the black pieces in more than a year. His team, Norway, finished 51st out of 149 teams.

Carlsen played in the Grand Slam Masters Final in October, which he had qualified for automatically by winning three of the previous year's four Grand Slam chess events. The average Elo of the participants at the time was 2789, making the Grand Slam Final the strongest chess tournament in history. In the first round, Carlsen lost with black to Kramnik; this was Carlsen's second consecutive loss to Kramnik, and placed his hold on the world No. 1 ranking in jeopardy. In his second round, Carlsen lost with the white pieces to Anand; this was his first loss as White since January 2010. Carlsen recovered somewhat in the latter part of the tournament, achieving a win over Shirov, and finishing with 2½/6; Kramnik won the event with 4/6.

In October, Carlsen competed at the Pearl Spring chess tournament in Nanjing, China. This was the only tournament in 2010 to feature Anand, Carlsen and Topalov, at the time the top three players in the world, and was the first tournament in history to feature three players rated at least 2800. Carlsen secured first place by defeating Topalov with black. This was his second victory in the tournament over the former world No. 1; his final score of 7/10 (with a PR of 2903) was a full point ahead of runner-up Anand.

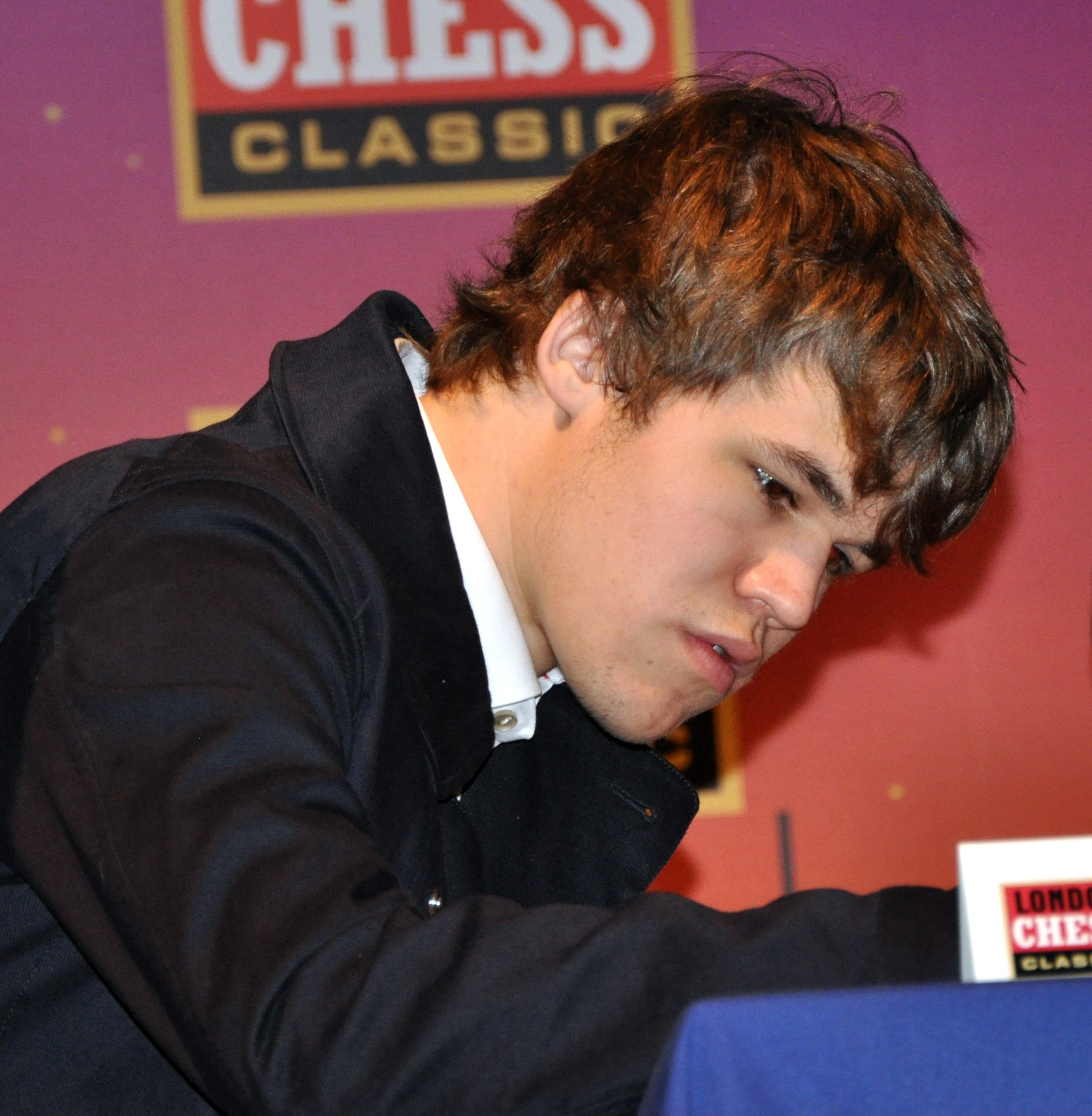
Carlsen at the 2010 London Chess Classic

On 5 November, Carlsen withdrew from the 2011 Candidates Tournament, having qualified as the highest rated challenger, citing dissatisfaction with the World Championship cycle format.

In the World Blitz Championship, held in Moscow in November, Carlsen finished third with a score of 23½/38, behind Radjabov and winner Levon Aronian. After the tournament, Carlsen played a private 40-game blitz match against Hikaru Nakamura, winning with a score of 24½–15½. Carlsen won the London Chess Classic in December, ahead of Anand and McShane.

== 2011 ==
Carlsen competed in the GM-A group of the 73rd Tata Steel Chess Tournament (formerly called the Corus chess tournament) on 14–30 January in Wijk aan Zee in an attempt to defend his title; the field included World Champion Viswanathan Anand, Levon Aronian, former World Champion Vladimir Kramnik, Alexander Grischuk, Hikaru Nakamura, Ruslan Ponomariov, among others. Despite losing games with white against Anish Giri and reigning Russian champion Ian Nepomniachtchi, Carlsen finished with 8/13, including victories over Kramnik and tournament winner Nakamura. Although Carlsen's performance raised his rating from 2814 to 2815, Anand's 8½/13 score elevated his rating to 2817, making him the world No. 1 for the March 2011 FIDE rating list.

The first tournament victory of the year came in the Bazna Kings tournament, a double round robin played in Mediaș, Romania on 11–21 June. Carlsen finished with 6½/10, equal with Sergey Karjakin but with a better tiebreak score. Carlsen won his White games against Nakamura, Nisipeanu, and Ivanchuk and drew the rest of the games.

Carlsen won the 44th Biel Grandmaster tournament, held from 16 to 29 July. He took clear first place with a score of 19/30 (+5−1=4; three points for a win) in a field comprising Fabiano Caruana, Maxime Vachier-Lagrave, Alexander Morozevich, Alexey Shirov and Yannick Pelletier, two points ahead of Morozevich. This was Carlsen's second title.

The Grand Slam Chess Final was held as a double round robin with six players, in São Paulo (25 September – 1 October) and Bilbao (5–11 October). Although Carlsen had a slow start, including a loss against bottom-ranked Francisco Vallejo Pons, he finished +3−1=6, equal with Ivanchuk (whose +4−3=3 finish was equal due to three points for a win). Carlsen then won the blitz tiebreak against Ivanchuk. The other players were Anand, Aronian, Nakamura, and Vallejo Pons.

Another tournament victory was achieved in the Tal Memorial in Moscow 16–25 November as a round robin with ten players. Carlsen won two games, against Gelfand and Nakamura, and drew the rest. Although he finished equal on points with Aronian, he placed ahead since the tiebreak was determined by the number of black games; Carlsen had five black games, while Aronian only had four.

In the London Chess Classic, played 3–12 December, Carlsen's streak of tournament victories ended when he finished third, behind Kramnik and Nakamura. Carlsen won three games and drew five. Although he did not win the tournament, Carlsen gained rating points, rising to a new personal record of 2835.

== 2012 ==
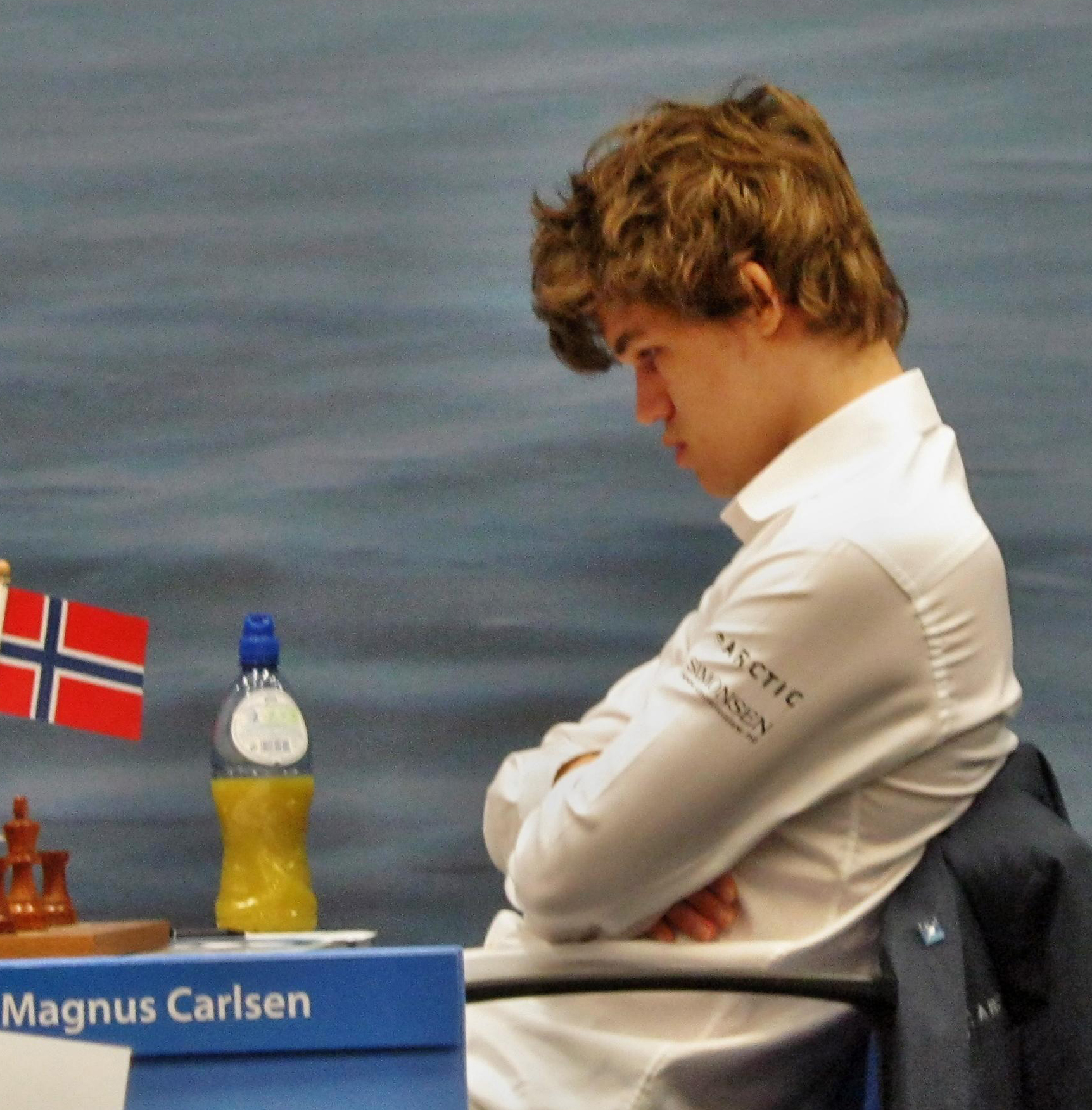
Carlsen at the 74th Tata Steel Chess Tournament in 2012

At the 74th Tata Steel Chess Tournament held on 14–29 January in Wijk aan Zee, Carlsen finished in a shared second place with 8/13, behind Aronian, and equal with Radjabov and Caruana. Carlsen defeated Gashimov, Aronian, Gelfand, and Topalov, but lost against Karjakin. At the blitz chess tournament at Tal Memorial, held in Moscow on 7 June, Carlsen shared first place with Morozevich. In the main event (a category 22 ten-player round robin), he won two games and drew seven. He finished in first place, ahead of Radjabov and Caruana.

Carlsen then went on to finish second in the Biel Grandmaster Tournament, with 18 points, just one point behind Wang Hao using the 3–1–0 scoring system. As in the Tal Memorial earlier in 2012, Carlsen managed to finish the tournament without any losses (+4−0=6). He also defeated the winner Wang in both of their individual games. In the exhibition blitz tournament at Biel before the GM tournament, Carlsen was eliminated (+1−2=0) in the first round by Étienne Bacrot. Bacrot deprived Carlsen of a win in the classical tournament by holding him to a draw in the final round. Carlsen would have won the classical tournament on the traditional 1–½–0 scoring system, with 7/10.

The Grand Slam Chess Final was again held as a double round robin with six players, in São Paulo and Bilbao. Carlsen started with a loss against Caruana, but after three wins in the second (Bilbao) round, finished +4−1=5, equal first with Caruana, and ahead of Aronian, Karjakin and Anand. Carlsen won the tournament by winning both tiebreak games against Caruana.

From 24 to 25 November, Carlsen took part in the chess festival "Segunda Gran Fiesta Internacional de Ajedrez" in Mexico City. As part of it, Carlsen took on an online audience (dubbed as "The World") with the white pieces and won. He then took part in the knockout exhibition event "Cuadrangular UNAM". Carlsen first beat Lázaro Bruzón 1½–½, thus qualifying for a final against Judit Polgár (who had in turn beat Manuel León Hoyos 1½–½). Carlsen lost the first game, but won the second one, and in the tiebreak defeated Polgár 2–0.

Carlsen won the London Chess Classic in December with five wins (over McShane, Aronian, Gawain Jones, Adams and Judit Polgár) and three draws (against Kramnik, Nakamura and Anand). This win, the third time Carlsen had won the tournament in the past four years, increased his rating from 2848 to a new record of 2861, breaking Kasparov's 13-year record of 2851. By rating performance, this was one of the best results in history, with a PR of 2994.

== 2013 ==
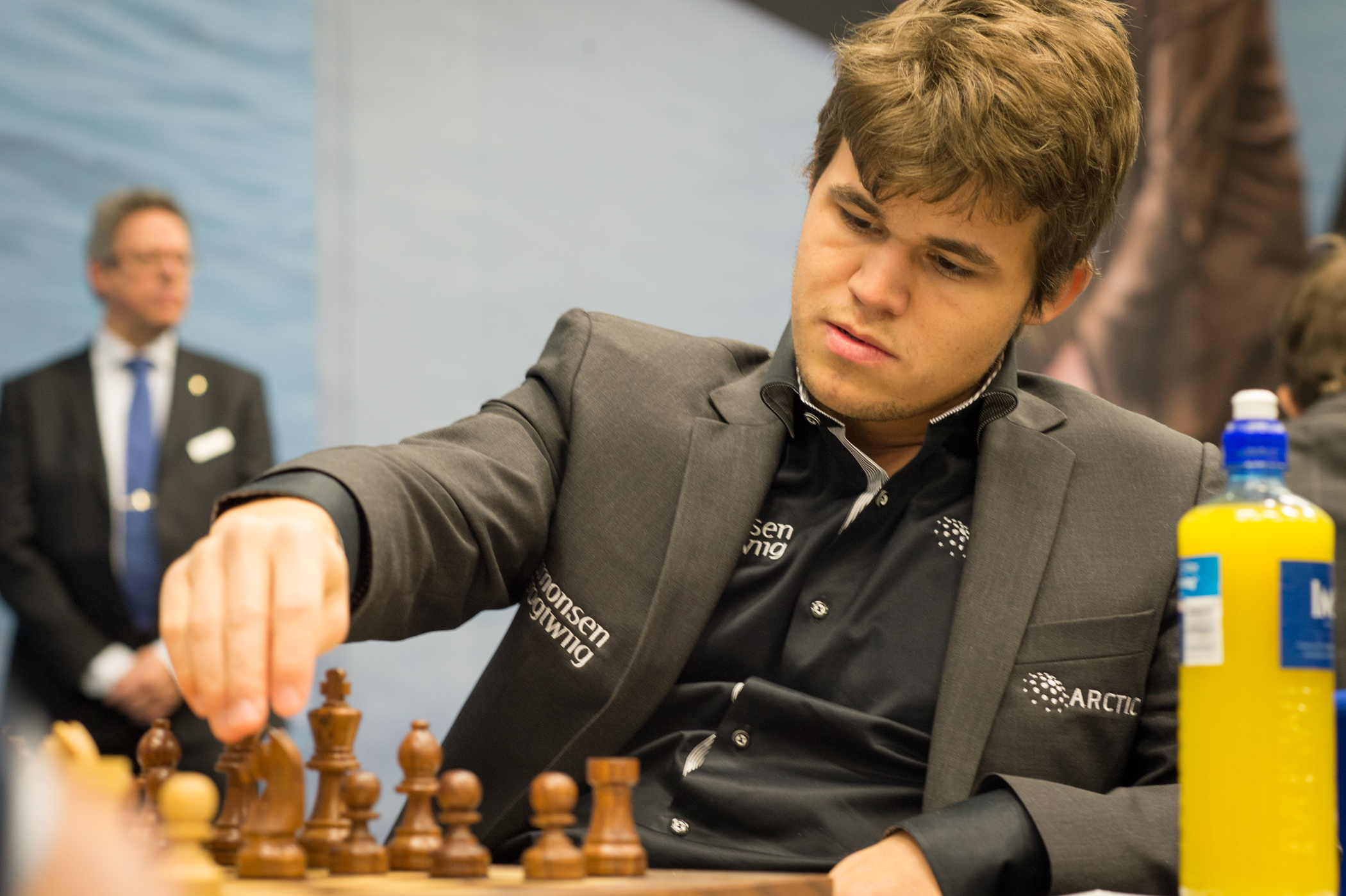
Carlsen in play during round seven of the 75th Tata Steel, 2013

Carlsen played in the 75th Tata Steel Chess Tournament from 11 to 27 January in Wijk aan Zee. In the 13-round tournament, he scored 10 points (+7−0=6), winning clear first 1½ points ahead of second-place finisher Aronian. On 1 February, Danish GM Peter Heine Nielsen joined the team of assistants who helped Carlsen prepare for the Candidates Tournament in March. Before this, Nielsen was on Vishy Anand's team.

Carlsen played in the 2013 Candidates Tournament, which took place in London, from 15 March to 1 April. He finished with +5−2=7, and won the tournament on tiebreak over Vladimir Kramnik. As a result, he earned the right to challenge Anand for the World Championship.

In May, Carlsen played in the inaugural Norway Chess tournament. He finished second, scoring 5½/9 (+3−1=5), half a point behind Sergey Karjakin.

Carlsen played in the Tal Memorial from 12 to 23 June. He finished second, with 5½/9, half a point behind Boris Gelfand. Carlsen ended the tournament with +3−1=5, losing to Caruana but beating Anand, Kramnik and Nakamura. Later that month, Carlsen played a four-game friendly rapid match against Borki Predojević, which he won 2½–1½.

In the inaugural Sinquefield Cup, held in September, Carlsen finished first, scoring 4½/6 (+3−0=3), a point ahead of Nakamura.

=== World Chess Championship 2013 ===
Carlsen faced Anand in the World Chess Championship 2013, at Hyatt Regency in Chennai, India, from 9 to 22 November. Carlsen won the match 6½–3½ by winning games five, six and nine and drawing the remainder, becoming the new World Chess Champion. Though he was the challenger, and less experienced than Anand, he successfully handled the pressure. He had his first win in game 5 by taking advantage of a small mistake by Anand, and emerged victorious in games 6 and 9, making him the 16th undisputed World Chess Champion.

World Chess Championship 2013
| | Rating | Rank | Match Games | | | | | | | | | | | | Score |
| | Rating | Rank | 1 | 2 | 3 | 4 | 5 | 6 | 7 | 8 | 9 | 10 | 11 | 12 | Score |
|---|---|---|---|---|---|---|---|---|---|---|---|---|---|---|---|
| Magnus Carlsen (NOR) | 2870 | 1 | ½ | ½ | ½ | ½ | 1 | 1 | ½ | ½ | 1 | ½ | - | - | 6½ |
| Viswanathan Anand (IND) | 2775 | 8 | ½ | ½ | ½ | ½ | 0 | 0 | ½ | ½ | 0 | ½ | - | - | 3½ |

== 2014 ==
From 29 January to 4 February, Carlsen played in the Zurich Chess Challenge, winning the blitz event (+2−1=2) and the classical event (+3−0=2). He fared worse in the rapid event (+1−2=2), which counted towards the overall standings, but retained enough of a lead to win the tournament. The other players in the event were Aronian, Nakamura, Caruana, Gelfand and Anand. On 22 March, Carlsen played a game for his club Stavanger in the final team match for promotion to the Norwegian Premier League. His win over Vladimir Georgiev helped his team to a 3½–2½ win over Nordstrand.

Carlsen won the Vugar Gashimov Memorial in Şəmkir, Azerbaijan, played from 20 to 30 April. He played in the A group along with Caruana, Nakamura, Karjakin, Shakhriyar Mamedyarov and Radjabov. Carlsen started the tournament with 2/2, beating Mamedyarov and Nakamura. He then drew against Karjakin, only to lose two consecutive games for the first time in four years, losing to Caruana with black and then with white to Radjabov. In the second half of the tournament, Carlsen scored 4/5, beating Mamedyarov and Nakamura again, and securing the tournament victory by beating Caruana in the final round, finishing with +5−2=3.

On 8 May, Carlsen played an exhibition game at Oslo City against the people of Norway, assisted by a grandmaster panel consisting of Simen Agdestein, Jon Ludvig Hammer, and Leif Erlend Johannessen, each of whom was allowed three chances to consult a chess engine during the game. The game was drawn when Carlsen forced a perpetual check.

From 2–13 June, Carlsen played in Norway Chess 2014, a ten-player round robin. He placed second with 5½/9 (+2−0=7), ½ a point behind the winner Karjakin.

Carlsen won the World Rapid Championship 2014, which was held in Dubai from 16 to 19 June. He went on to claim the World Blitz Championship two days later, becoming the first player to simultaneously hold the title in all three FIDE rated time controls, known as the "triple crown".

Carlsen played nine games for Norway in the 41st Chess Olympiad, scoring five wins, two draws, and two losses (against Arkadij Naiditsch and Ivan Šarić).

Carlsen placed second to Fabiano Caruana in the Sinquefield Cup, a six-player double round robin held from 27 August to 7 September. Billed as the strongest chess tournament ever held, the remaining 4 players in the event were Levon Aronian, Hikaru Nakamura, Veselin Topalov, and Maxime Vachier-Lagrave. Carlsen lost to Caruana in round 3 and defeated Aronian and Nakamura in rounds 5 and 7, respectively. He finished the tournament with 5½/10 (+2−1=7), three points behind Caruana.

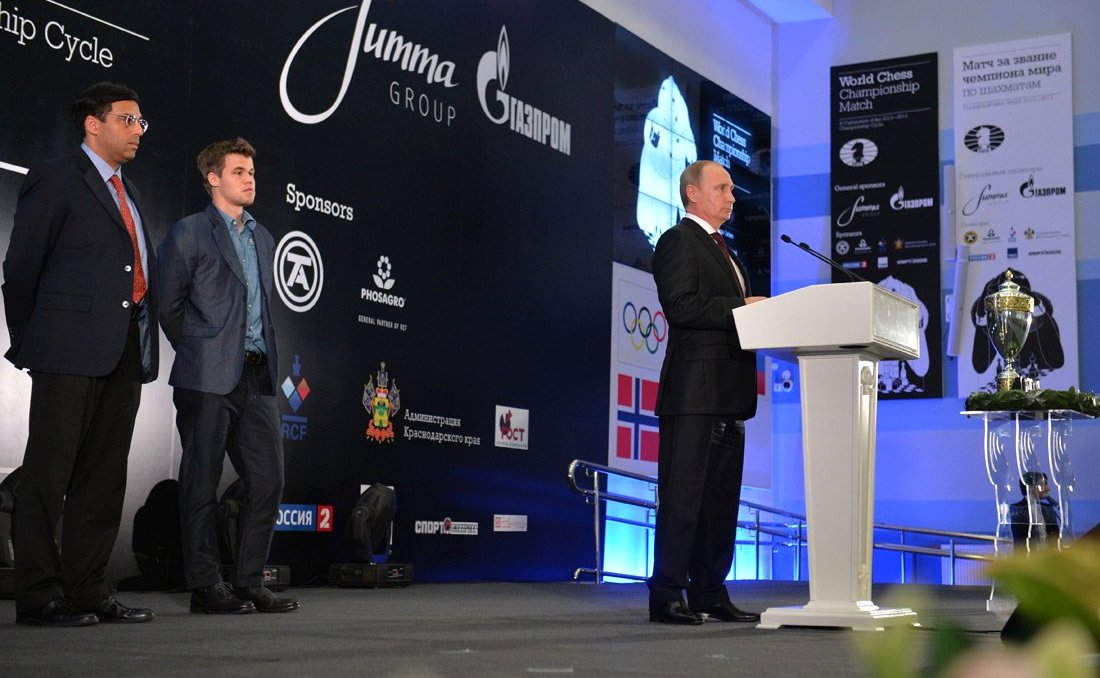
Anand and Carlsen on stage at the closing ceremony of 2014 World Chess Championship in Sochi, Russia (Vladimir Putin at podium)

=== World Chess Championship 2014 ===
Carlsen faced Anand in the World Chess Championship 2014 in Sochi, Russia from 7 to 23 November, a rematch of their 2013 match. Carlsen drew first blood in game 2, but Anand immediately struck back in game 3. The key moment was in the infamous game 6 when both players missed a basic tactic that would have given Anand a winning position; instead, it was Carlsen who converted his advantage to win. After a series of draws, Carlsen won game 11 by refuting an unsound gamble by Anand. Thus, Carlsen won the match with a round to spare, defending his World Champion title.

World Chess Championship 2014
| | Rating | Rank | Match Games | | | | | | | | | | | | Score |
| | Rating | Rank | 1 | 2 | 3 | 4 | 5 | 6 | 7 | 8 | 9 | 10 | 11 | 12 | Score |
|---|---|---|---|---|---|---|---|---|---|---|---|---|---|---|---|
| Magnus Carlsen (NOR) | 2863 | 1 | ½ | 1 | 0 | ½ | ½ | 1 | ½ | ½ | ½ | ½ | 1 | - | 6½ |
| Viswanathan Anand (IND) | 2792 | 6 | ½ | 0 | 1 | ½ | ½ | 0 | ½ | ½ | ½ | ½ | 0 | - | 4½ |

== 2015 ==
In January, Carlsen won the 77th Tata Steel Chess Tournament, which was played mainly in Wijk aan Zee on 9–25 January. Despite a slow start with a loss in the third round to Radosław Wojtaszek, he managed to score a staggering six consecutive wins. Drawing the final four games was sufficient to win the tournament with 9 points out of 13 (+6−1=6), half a point ahead of Anish Giri, Maxime Vachier-Lagrave, Wesley So and Ding Liren.

In February, Carlsen won the 3rd Grenke Chess Classic after a five-game tiebreak with Arkadij Naiditsch. Carlsen had finished joint first with Naiditsch on 4½/7, beating Michael Adams, Anand, and David Baramidze, and losing to Naiditsch in their classical encounter. This tournament victory meant that Carlsen began 2015 by winning two out of two tournaments. Carlsen continued his streak in April, winning Shamkir Chess with a score of 7/9 (+5−0=4), defeating Mamedyarov, Caruana, Vachier-Lagrave, Kramnik, and Rauf Mamedov. With a performance rating of 2983, this was Carlsen's third best tournament result ever, behind only Nanjing 2009 (3002 TPR) and London 2012 (2994 TPR).

Carlsen had a poor result in the third edition of Norway Chess, held 15–26 June. In the first round he obtained a winning position against Topalov after pressing in a long endgame, only to lose on time when he mistakenly thought that he would receive 15 minutes of extra time at move 60. He was then outplayed by Caruana in the second round, missed a win against Anish Giri in round 3, and lost to Anand in round 4. He won against Grischuk in round 5, drew against Nakamura and Vachier-Lagrave in rounds 6 and 7, and defeated Aronian in round 8, but he lost the last round against Jon Ludvig Hammer, leaving him in seventh place and with a performance rating of 2693. Carlsen said of this result: "It's just extremely frustrating not to be able to show anything close to what I am capable of in my home country."

From 22 August to 3 September, Carlsen played in the 2015 Sinquefield Cup. He finished in second place with 5/9 (+3−2=4), one point behind winner Levon Aronian. He defeated the 2014 Sinquefield winner Fabiano Caruana, as well as Maxime Vachier-Lagrave and wild-card Wesley So, but lost to Veselin Topalov and Alexander Grischuk.

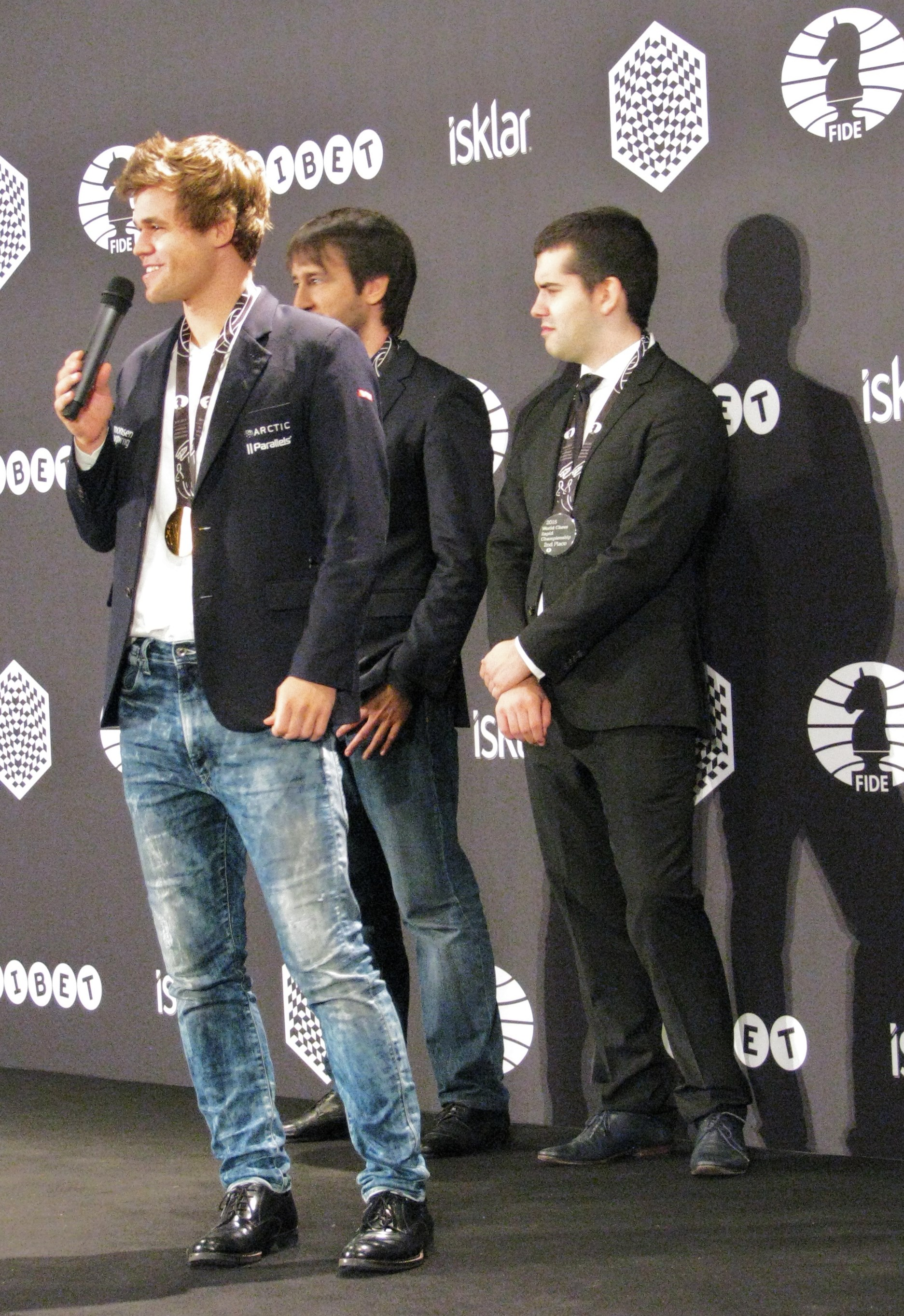
Carlsen at the FIDE World Rapid Championship 2015 award ceremony

In October, Carlsen successfully defended his title in the FIDE World Rapid Championships held in Berlin, as the first World Rapid Champion to do so in history, going +8−0=7. He reached the highest live rapid rating in history after the tournament, and was at that point ranked No. 1 in all three disciplines simultaneously. However, Carlsen lost his No. 1 blitz ranking after he had a weak second day in the World Blitz Championship, and was unable to retain his World Blitz Champion title, losing it to Alexander Grischuk.

In November, Carlsen participated in the European Team Chess Championship with the Norwegian team. He started off poorly, scoring ½ points out of 3 games, losing to Levon Aronian, drawing against Sune Berg Hansen, and losing again to Yannick Pelletier due to a blunder. However, he finished the tournament strongly, scoring victories against Peter Leko and Radoslaw Wojtaszek, the latter of whom he had lost to earlier in the year, but his performance was not enough to earn his team a medal, and he lost 16 rating points during the event.

From 4–13 December, Carlsen participated in the final leg of the Grand Chess Tour, the London Chess Classic. He scored 5½/9 (+2−0=7) in the event, defeating Nakamura (thus inflicting Nakamura's 12th classical loss to Carlsen) and Grischuk, and finished joint first with Anish Giri and Maxime Vachier-Lagrave. In the 3-way tiebreak, Carlsen was the top seed, meaning he faced the winner of the first tie-break match between Giri and Vachier-Lagrave. Carlsen eventually won the tournament by defeating Vachier-Lagrave, which meant he also won the overall Grand Chess Tour. Carlsen then played in the second edition of the Qatar Masters Open, which was held from 20 to 29 December. He finished joint first with 7/9 (+5−0=4), and defeated Yu Yangyi in a tie-break match to win the tournament.

== 2016 ==
From 15 to 31 January, Carlsen participated in the 78th Tata Steel Chess Tournament, held in Wijk Aan Zee. Carlsen won the tournament by scoring 9 points out of 13 (+5−0=8), earning him his 5th Wijk Aan Zee title.

From 18 to 30 April, Carlsen played in the fourth edition of Norway Chess. He finished in first place with 6/9 (+4−1=4), half a point ahead of runner-up Levon Aronian. This was Carlsen's first Norway Chess victory.

From 17 to 20 June, Carlsen played in the Leuven leg of the Grand Chess Tour. He finished first in the rapid portion of the tournament with 12/18 (+5−2=2; two points for a win) and also first in the blitz portion with 11/18 (+7−3=8) to place first overall with a score of 23/36, two and a half points ahead of the runner-up, Wesley So.

In July, Carlsen won the 9th edition of the Bilbao Masters Final, scoring 17 points out of 10 games (+4−1=5; a win was 3 points, a draw was 1 point). His only loss was to Hikaru Nakamura, who had never beaten Carlsen in classical chess before.

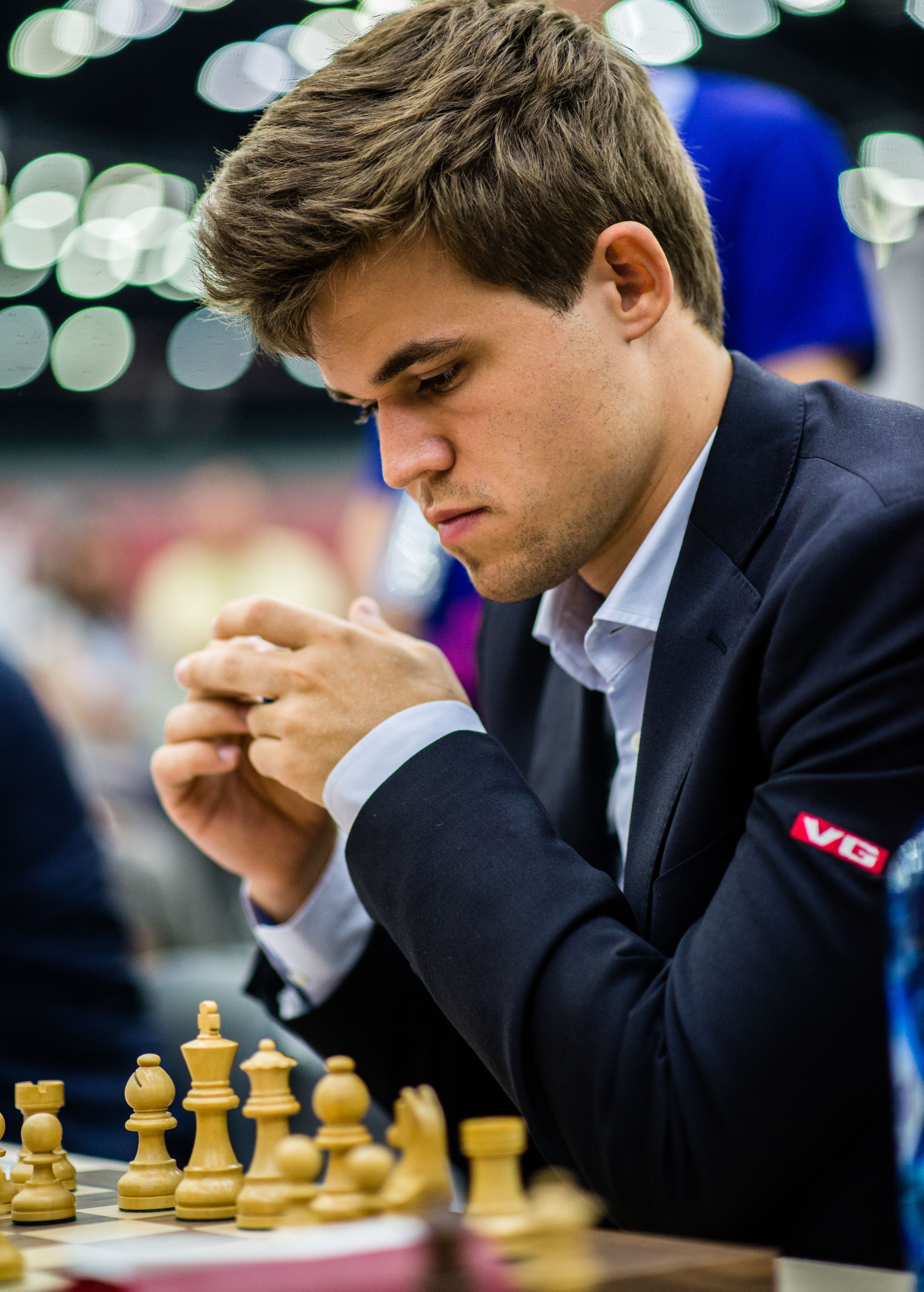
Carlsen at the 42nd Chess Olympiad, 8 September 2016

Carlsen represented 12th-seeded Norway in the 42nd Chess Olympiad, leading the team to a 5th-place finish among the 180 teams. Carlsen, for his part, scored 7½/10 (+5–0=5).

Carlsen also played in Chess.com's inaugural Grandmaster Blitz Battle Championship, a blitz and bullet knockout event. Magnus defeated Tigran L. Petrosian 21 to 4 in the first round, and beat Alexander Grischuk 16 to 8 in the semi-final. On 27 October, he defeated Nakamura in the final by 14½ to 10½ and became the first Speed Chess Champion.

From 26 to 30 December, Carlsen played in the World Rapid and Blitz Championships held in Doha, Qatar. He scored 11/15 (+10–3=2) in the rapid tournament, tying for first with Vasyl Ivanchuk and Grischuk, but finishing third on tiebreak. In the blitz tournament, he scored 16½/21, finishing second on tiebreak behind Karjakin, and 2 points clear of the rest of the field.

=== World Chess Championship 2016 ===
Carlsen faced Sergey Karjakin in the 2016 World Chess Championship in New York City. The 12-game classical match, held between 11 and 28 November, concluded with a 6–6 tie. The match began with seven consecutive draws. Karjakin drew first blood by winning game 8, but Carlsen equalised the match in game 10. Games 11 and 12 were both drawn. The tiebreaking games were held on 30 November, Carlsen's 26th birthday. After drawing games 1 and 2, Carlsen won games 3 and 4 to record a 3–1 victory and retain his World Champion title. In the fourth rapid tiebreak game, Carlsen secured the match by sacrificing his queen with 50.Qh6+, forcing mate in two. Grandmaster Lubomir Kavalek described the move as "the most brilliant final move of any world chess championship in history."

World Chess Championship 2016
| | Rating | Rank | Match Games (Classical) | | | | | | | | | | | | Tiebreak (Rapid) | | | | Score |
| | Rating | Rank | 1 | 2 | 3 | 4 | 5 | 6 | 7 | 8 | 9 | 10 | 11 | 12 | 13 | 14 | 15 | 16 | Score |
|---|---|---|---|---|---|---|---|---|---|---|---|---|---|---|---|---|---|---|---|
| Magnus Carlsen (NOR) | 2853 | 1 | ½ | ½ | ½ | ½ | ½ | ½ | ½ | 0 | ½ | 1 | ½ | ½ | ½ | ½ | 1 | 1 | 6 (3) |
| Sergey Karjakin (RUS) | 2772 | 9 | ½ | ½ | ½ | ½ | ½ | ½ | ½ | 1 | ½ | 0 | ½ | ½ | ½ | ½ | 0 | 0 | 6 (1) |

== 2017 ==
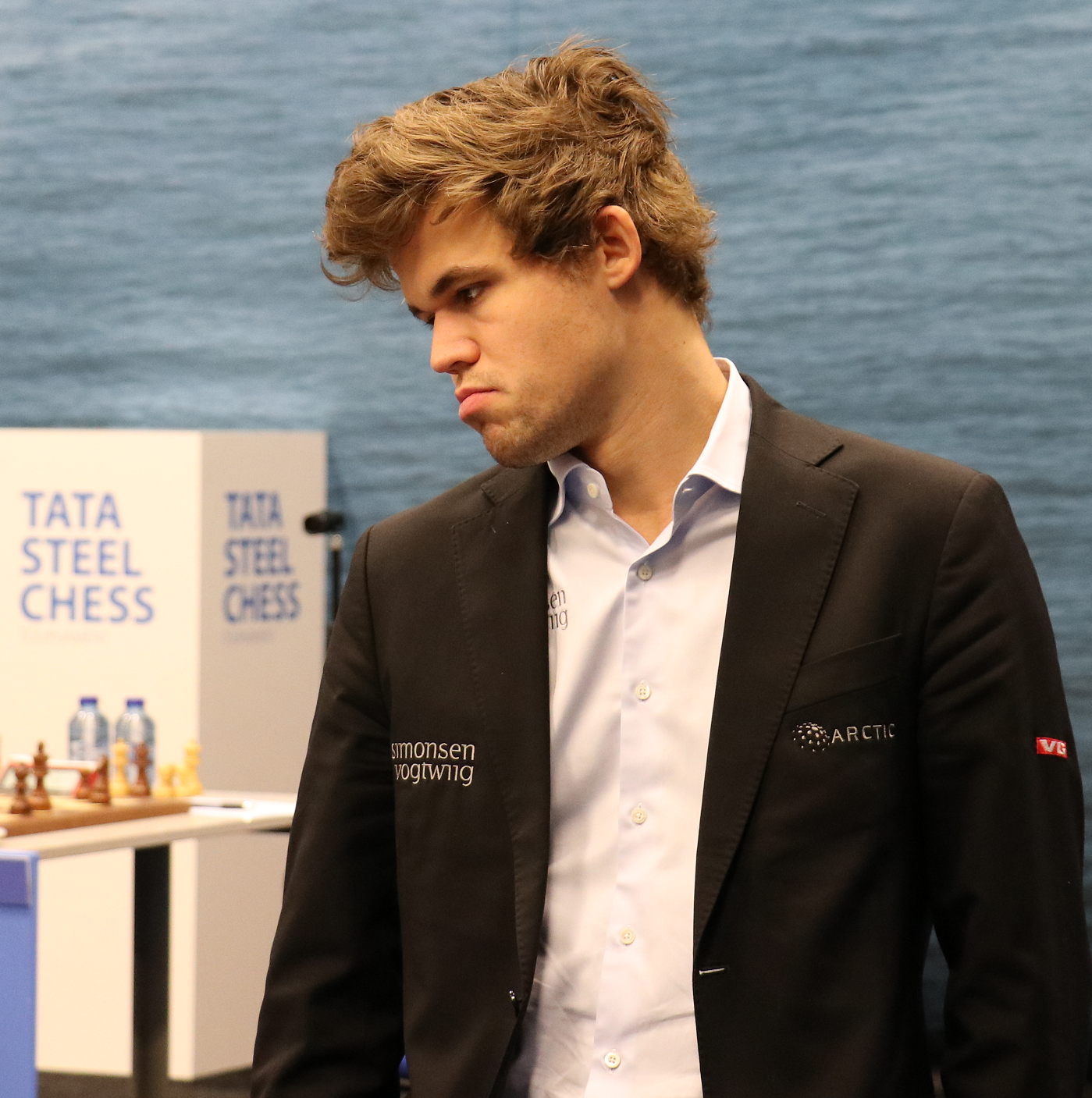
Carlsen at the 79th Tata Steel Chess Tournament, 29 January 2017

In January, Carlsen participated in the 79th Tata Steel Chess Tournament. He started well, scoring 2 wins and 4 draws in his first 6 games, but missed mate-in-3 versus Giri in round 7, which Giri described as "the most embarrassing moment" of Carlsen's career. Carlsen then lost in round 8 to Richárd Rapport, and ultimately placed second with 8/13 (+4−1=8), one point behind winner Wesley So.

From 13 to 22 April, Carlsen competed in the 4th Grenke Chess Classic, finishing in joint second place, though third on tiebreaks, with Fabiano Caruana, with a score of 4/7 (+1−0=6). The clear winner with 5½ points (+4−0=3) was Levon Aronian. As a result, Carlsen's FIDE rating dropped to 2832, his lowest since November 2011 (2826).

Carlsen participated in the fifth edition of Norway Chess from 6 to 16 June. He performed poorly and had a performance rating of 2755, his lowest since 2015 (2670, at the European Team Chess Championship). Ultimately, he placed ninth in the round-robin tournament with 4/9 (+1−2=6), losing to tournament winner Aronian and Kramnik and winning against Karjakin.

Carlsen played in the Paris leg of the 2017 Grand Chess Tour, which was held from 21 to 25 June. He finished first in the rapid portion of the tournament with 14/18 (+5−0=4; two points for a win) and fifth in the blitz portion with 10/18 (+8−6=4) to place joint first overall with Vachier-Lagrave. Carlsen then defeated Vachier-Lagrave in the playoff to win the tournament.

From 28 June to 2 July, he played in the Leuven leg of the Grand Chess Tour. Carlsen won this tournament convincingly, scoring 11/18 (+3−1=5; two points for a win) in the rapid portion and 14½/18 (+12−1=5) in the blitz portion for an overall score of 25½/36, three points ahead of the runner-up, Wesley So. His performance rating in the blitz portion of the tournament was 3018, which Garry Kasparov described as "phenomenal". Additionally, Leonard Barden, writing for The Guardian, said the performance was only matched by Fischer's 19/22 score at the 1970 World Blitz Championship.

From 2 to 11 August, Carlsen competed in the Sinquefield Cup, the first classical event of the Grand Chess Tour. He finished joint second with Anand, scoring 5½/9 (+3−1=5). He recorded three victories (against Karjakin, So and Aronian) and his one loss was to Vachier-Lagrave, who won the tournament with 6/9 (+3−0=6). This result left Carlsen in first place in the Grand Chess Tour standings with 34 points, three points ahead of second place Vachier-Lagrave.

In September, he took part in the Chess World Cup 2017. He defeated Oluwafemi Balogun 2–0 in the first round to advance to the second round, where he defeated Aleksey Dreev 2–0. He was then defeated in the third round by Bu Xiangzhi 1½–½ and eliminated from the tournament.

On 1 October, Carlsen won the Isle of Man Open, a tournament held from 23 September to 1 October. He scored 7½/9 (+6−0=3), half a point ahead of Nakamura and Anand, for a performance rating of 2903. This was Carlsen's first classical tournament victory in 435 days.

From 9 to 14 November, Carlsen faced Ding Liren in the 2017 Champions Showdown, a match consisting of 10 rapid and 20 blitz games, hosted by the Saint Louis Chess Club. Carlsen won, scoring 22–8 (+16−2=12).

From 1 to 11 December, Carlsen competed in the 2017 London Chess Classic, the final event of the 2017 Grand Chess Tour. He finished in a 3-way tie for 3rd, scoring 5/9 (+2−1=6). Carlsen's placing awarded him 7 additional points in the Grand Chess Tour standings, which was enough to crown him the 2017 Grand Chess Tour champion.

From 26 to 30 December, Carlsen played in the 2017 World Rapid and World Blitz Championships, held in Riyadh, Saudi Arabia. He finished fifth in the rapid event, scoring 10/15 (+8−3=4). Anand shared first place with Vladimir Fedoseev on 10½/15, and won the tournament after defeating Fedoseev on tiebreak. Carlsen won the blitz event, scoring 16/21 (+13−2=6), one and a half points ahead of his nearest competitors, Karjakin and Anand. This was Carlsen's third World Blitz Chess Championship victory.

Carlsen set records for the highest FIDE ratings in rapid (2919) and blitz (2986).

== 2018 ==
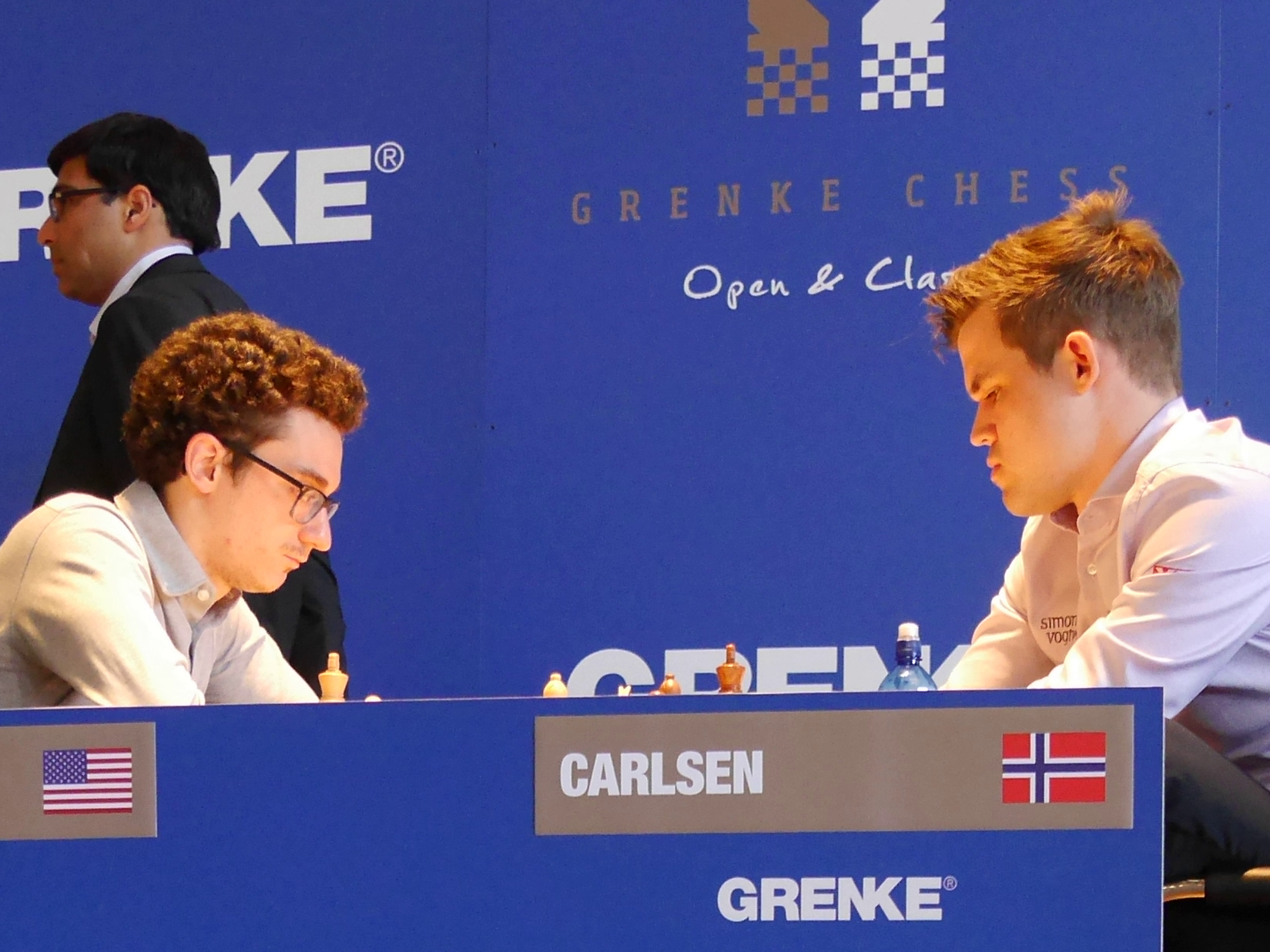
Carlsen facing Caruana at the 5th Grenke Chess Classic, 31 March 2018

From October 2017 to January 2018, Carlsen played in the second edition of Chess.com's Speed Chess Championship. He defeated Gadir Guseinov, So and Grischuk in the first three rounds 20½–5½, 27½–9½ and 15½–10½, respectively. On 3 January he defeated Nakamura 18–9 in the final, thus winning the tournament for a consecutive time.

From 13 to 28 January, Carlsen competed in the 80th Tata Steel Chess Tournament. He placed joint first with Giri, scoring 9/13 (+5−0=8). Carlsen then defeated Giri 1½–½ in the blitz playoff, thus winning the tournament for a record sixth time. In February, Carlsen won a Chess960 match against Nakamura by a score of 14–10.

Carlsen placed second with a score of 5½/9 (+2−0=7) in the 5th Grenke Chess Classic, held from 31 March to 9 April. Caruana won the event with 6½/9 (+4−0=5). Carlsen won the fifth edition of Shamkir Chess, held from 18 to 28 April, finishing clear first with a score of 6/9 (+3−0=6). From 28 May to 7 June, he competed in the sixth edition of Norway Chess, placing second with 4½/8 (+2−1=5), half a point behind winner Caruana. He defeated Caruana and Aronian in rounds 1 and 3, respectively, but lost to So in round 6.

Carlsen participated in the 51st Biel Grandmaster tournament, held from 23 July to 1 August. He finished second on 6/10 (+3−1=6), one-and-a-half points behind the winner Mamedyarov. In August, he competed in the 6th Sinquefield Cup. He tied for first with Caruana and Aronian on 5½/9 (+2−0=7), and jointly won the tournament after the trio decided to share the title. Carlsen represented Vålerenga sjakklubb at the 34th European Chess Club Cup in October. He scored 3½/6 (+1−0=5), as his team finished fifth.

From 26 to 30 December, Carlsen played in the 2018 World Rapid and World Blitz Chess Championships, held in Saint Petersburg, Russia. He lost three of his first eight games—including both of the first two—to significantly lower-rated opponents in the rapid event. Despite a strong recovery, he was unable to attain a medal, placing fifth with 10½/15 (+9−3=3). He defended his blitz title, going unbeaten to finish clear first on a score of 17/21 (+13−0=8).

=== World Chess Championship 2018 ===
Carlsen faced Fabiano Caruana in the 2018 World Chess Championship in London from 9 and 28 November. The match featured an extremely high quality of play and opening preparation, and all 12 classical games were drawn. However, Carlsen had strong winning chances in game 1 as did Caruana in games 6 and 8. In game 12, Carlsen surprised most commentators by agreeing to a draw in a much better position, considering himself the heavy favourite in the rapid tiebreaks. He vindicated his decision by defeating Caruana 3–0 in rapid tiebreak games, winning his fourth World Championship. Carlsen cited the first rapid game as "critical", and said he felt "very calm" after winning it.

World Chess Championship 2018
| | Rating | Rank | Match Games (Classical) | | | | | | | | | | | | Tiebreak (Rapid) | | | Score |
| | Rating | Rank | 1 | 2 | 3 | 4 | 5 | 6 | 7 | 8 | 9 | 10 | 11 | 12 | 13 | 14 | 15 | Score |
|---|---|---|---|---|---|---|---|---|---|---|---|---|---|---|---|---|---|---|
| Magnus Carlsen (NOR) | 2835 | 1 | ½ | ½ | ½ | ½ | ½ | ½ | ½ | ½ | ½ | ½ | ½ | ½ | 1 | 1 | 1 | 6 (3) |
| Fabiano Caruana (USA) | 2832 | 2 | ½ | ½ | ½ | ½ | ½ | ½ | ½ | ½ | ½ | ½ | ½ | ½ | 0 | 0 | 0 | 6 (0) |

== 2019 ==
From 12 to 27 January, Carlsen competed in the 81st Tata Steel Chess Tournament. Carlsen won the tournament with a score of 9/13 (+5−0=8), winning against Viswanathan Anand, Richárd Rapport, Jan-Krzysztof Duda, Shakhriyar Mamedyarov, and Jorden van Foreest. He finished half a point ahead of runner-up Giri, achieved a record-extending seventh Tata Steel title.

Carlsen participated in the sixth edition of Shamkir Chess, held from 31 March to 9 April. He took clear first place with 7/9 (+5−0=4), two points ahead of runner-up Ding. Carlsen recorded a performance rating of 2988; Leonard Barden, writing for The Guardian, described it as the most dominant elite tournament performance since Fabiano Caruana’s victory at the Sinquefield Cup 2014. Carlsen said at the event's closing ceremony that it was "one of the best tournaments I've ever played, both in terms of performance and also the quality of the games." Later in April, Carlsen won the 6th Grenke Chess Classic. He took clear first place with 7½/9 (+6−0=3) and increased his rating to 2875.

In early May, Carlsen won the Côte d'Ivoire Rapid & Blitz, the first leg of the 2019 Grand Chess Tour, with a score of 26½/36. In late May, Carlsen won his sixth consecutive tournament, winning the Lindores Abbey Chess Stars Tournament. The four-man rapid tournament was a double round-robin. In addition to Carlsen, Anand, Ding, and Karjakin participated. Carlsen's score was 3½/6 (+1−0=5).

In June, he won the seventh edition of Norway Chess. Scoring 13½/18 (+2–0=7), he finished three points ahead of his nearest competitors. His classical wins were over Yu Yangi and Alexander Grischuk, and he scored 6/7 in his armageddon games. From 26 June to 7 July, Carlsen participated in the second leg of the 2019 Grand Chess Tour, held in Zagreb. He took clear first with 8/11 (+5−0=6), and improved his rating to 2882, equalling his peak set in 2014. This was Carlsen's eighth consecutive tournament victory.

From 10 to 14 August, Carlsen participated in the fourth leg of the 2019 Grand Chess Tour, the St. Louis Rapid & Blitz. He had a poor showing, scoring 8/18 (+3−4=2, points doubled) in rapid and 9/18 (+6−6=6) in blitz for a combined total of 17/36, putting him in sixth place. The fifth leg, the 7th Sinquefield Cup, was a classical tournament. Carlsen won his last two games to tie for first on 6½/11 (+2−0=9) with Ding, but lost the tiebreak 1–3, drawing both rapid games then losing two consecutive blitz games.

At the FIDE Grand Swiss Tournament 2019 held in October on the Isle of Man, Carlsen placed sixth with 7½/11 (+4−0=7). He thus extended his unbeaten streak in classical chess to 101 games, surpassing Ding's record of 100 games. The 101 games consisted of 33 wins and 68 draws.

From 27 October to 2 November, Carlsen played in the inaugural FIDE World Fischer Random Chess Championship. He was automatically seeded to the semi-final round, as the unofficial Fischer Random Chess champion. He defeated Fabiano Caruana in the semi-finals 12½–7½, but was routed by Wesley So in the final round 13½–2½. In late November, Carlsen won the Tata Steel Rapid & Blitz, the final leg of the 2019 Grand Chess Tour, with a score of 27/36. At the 2019 London Chess Classic in December, the finals of the 2019 Grand Chess Tour, Carlsen was defeated in the semi-finals by Vachier-Lagrave on tie-breaks, 15½–14½. He then went on to beat Levon Aronian to claim third place.

From 26 to 30 December, Carlsen played in the World Rapid and World Blitz Championships, held in Moscow, Russia. He won the rapid championship an undefeated score of 11½/15 (+8-0=7) to win his third World Rapid title. Then, in the blitz championship, he scored 16½/21 (+13−1=7), tying for first with Hikaru Nakamura. He went on to defeat Nakamura 1½–½ in a tiebreak match to win his fifth World Blitz title. With these two tournament wins, Carlsen also claimed his third triple crown.

He finished the year having won ten elite over-the-board tournaments.

== 2020 ==
From 10 to 26 January, Carlsen competed in the 82nd Tata Steel Chess Tournament. He finished in second place with a score of 8/13 (+3−0=10), two points behind Caruana, who dominated the tournament. During the tournament, Carlsen surpassed Sergei Tiviakov's unbeaten streak in classical chess of 110 games.

During the COVID-19 pandemic, which prompted the cancellation of many physical tournaments, Carlsen organized the Magnus Carlsen Invitational along with Chess24. Billed as "the first professional online chess tournament," the eight-player rapid tournament was held from 18 April to 3 May, with a $250,000 prize fund. The first phase consisted of a single round-robin, after which the top four players would advance to the playoffs. Carlsen won the event by defeating Hikaru Nakamura 2½–1½ in the final.

Carlsen competed in the 8th Norway Chess from 5 to 16 October, which was the first elite over-the-board tournament held since social restrictions related to the COVID-19 pandemic were enforced. During the tournament, Carlsen's unbeaten streak in classical chess was ended by Jan-Krzysztof Duda. Carlsen had gone 125 games without defeat, a period spanning 2 years, 2 months and 10 days. During his streak, he recorded 42 wins and 83 draws with an average opponent rating of 2745, equivalent to the rating typically held by a top-20 player in the world. Despite the setback, Carlsen won the tournament with a round to spare, finishing on 19½ points, one point ahead of runner-up Alireza Firouzja.

In November, Carlsen played in the Skilling Open, the first leg of the Champions Chess Tour 2021. After advancing to the knockout stage, he won his matches against Anish Giri and Levon Aronian, but was beaten by Wesley So in the finals. In December, he played in the next leg of the tour, the Airthings Masters. He advanced to the knockout stage, but was eliminated by Daniil Dubov in the quarterfinals.

== 2021 ==
In January, Carlsen participated in the 83rd Tata Steel Chess Tournament. He finished in sixth place with a score of 7½/13 (+3−1=9). His loss to young Russian grandmaster Andrey Esipenko was his first loss to a sub-2700 rated player since 2015.

Throughout the year, Carlsen played in six more events of the inaugural Champions Chess Tour 2021, and qualified for the knockout stage in each of his appearances. In the Opera Euro Rapid in February, he won matches against Daniil Dubov and Maxime Vachier-Lagrave, but was beaten by Wesley So in the final. In the Magnus Carlsen Invitational (a major) in March, he beat Levon Aronian in the quarterfinals, but was eliminated by Ian Nepomniachtchi in the semifinals. In April, Carlsen won the New In Chess Classic by winning matches against Teimour Radjabov, Aronian, and Hikaru Nakamura in the finals. He also won the FTX Crypto Cup (major) in May by winning matches against Nakamura, Radjabov, and So in the finals. In the Goldmoney Asian Rapid in June/July, he won his quarterfinals match against So, but was eliminated by Aronian in the semifinals; he beat Nepomniachtchi in the 3rd place match.

In July, Carlsen played in the FIDE World Cup 2021 held in Sochi. He reached the semifinals by winning matches against Saša Martinović, Aryan Tari, Radosław Wojtaszek, Esipenko, and Étienne Bacrot. He was then eliminated by eventual tournament winner Jan-Krzysztof Duda in the semifinals, but won the third-place match against Vladimir Fedoseev.

Returning to the Champions Chess Tour in August, Carlsen won the Aimchess US Rapid by winning matches against Duda, Aronian, and Vladislav Artemiev. In total, he won one of the three major events and two of the remaining six regular events. In the tour finals in September/October, Carlsen finished in 4th place with a score of 15/27, but was still named the overall tour winner due to the high number of tour points he had accumulated.

Earlier in September, Carlsen won Norway Chess 2021 with a score 19½/30 (+4–1=3) ahead of runner-up Alireza Firouzja. After his sole loss in the fifth round of the classical portion to Sergey Karjakin, Carlsen won four straight classical games against Firouzja, Tari, Karjakin, and Richard Rapport.

From 26 to 30 December, Carlsen played in the World Rapid and World Blitz Chess Championships, held in Astana, Kazakhstan. In the rapid championship, he scored 9½/13 (+7–1=5), which tied for 1st place with Nodirbek Abdusattorov, Nepomniachtchi, and Fabiano Caruana. However, Carlsen placed 3rd on tiebreak and the regulations only allowed the top two players on tiebreak to play a playoff match. In the blitz championship, he finished 12th with a score of 13½/21 (+12−6=3), 1½ points behind the three players tied for 1st.

=== World Chess Championship 2021 ===
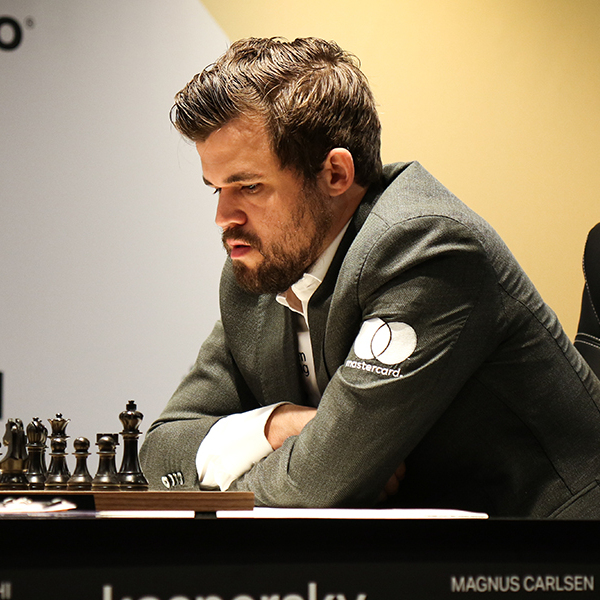
Carlsen in Dubai at the World Chess Championship 2021

Carlsen faced Ian Nepomniachtchi in the World Chess Championship 2021 in Dubai. The match began with five consecutive high-quality draws, before Carlsen won a closely-contested eight-hour struggle in Game 6 that, with 136 moves, was the longest ever game in a World Chess Championship. Following this loss, Nepomniachtchi collapsed, with Carlsen capitalizing on a series of blunders by Nepomniachtchi in Games 8, 9 and 11 to win another three points. This gave Carlsen a convincing match win with four wins, seven draws and no losses, retaining his World Championship title. After the match, Carlsen announced that he was unlikely to play the next World Championship match unless his challenger was rising star Alireza Firouzja.

World Chess Championship 2021
| | Rating | Rank | Match games | | | | | | | | | | | | | | Points |
| | Rating | Rank | 1 | 2 | 3 | 4 | 5 | 6 | 7 | 8 | 9 | 10 | 11 | 12 | 13 | 14 | Points |
|---|---|---|---|---|---|---|---|---|---|---|---|---|---|---|---|---|---|
| Magnus Carlsen (NOR) | 2856 | 1 | ½ | ½ | ½ | ½ | ½ | 1 | ½ | 1 | 1 | ½ | 1 | Not required | | | 7½ |
| Ian Nepomniachtchi (CFR) | 2782 | 5 | ½ | ½ | ½ | ½ | ½ | 0 | ½ | 0 | 0 | ½ | 0 | Not required | | | 3½ |

== 2022 ==
In January, Carlsen won Tata Steel 2022, further extending his record to eight Tata Steel titles. He finished with an undefeated score of 9½/13 (+5–0=7), 1½ points ahead of runners-up Shakhriyar Mamedyarov and Richárd Rapport. He scored wins against Mamedyarov, Rapport, Anish Giri, Fabiano Caruana, and R Praggnanandhaa, and was gifted a forfeit win.

In February, Carlsen won the Airthings Masters, the first leg of the Champions Chess Tour 2022, by advancing to the knockout and winning his matches against Lê Quang Liêm, Vladislav Artemiev, and Ian Nepomniachtchi in the finals. Similarly, Carlsen won the next leg, the Charity Cup, winning matches against Hans Niemann, Ding Liren, and Jan-Krzysztof Duda in the finals. In April, Carlsen tied for 3rd in the Oslo Esports Cup, a major event, with 12/21 match points. In May, he advanced to the knockouts of the Chessable Masters, but after defeating David Antón Guijarro, he was eliminated by Ding in the semifinals.

In early June, Carlsen won Norway Chess 2022 ahead of Mamedyarov and Vishy Anand. He finished with an undefeated score of 16½/27 (+3–0=6), with wins against Teimour Radjabov, Giri, and Mamedyarov. This was Carlsen's fourth consecutive Norway Chess title and his fifth overall.

On 20 July, the deadline FIDE had given him, Carlsen announced that he would not defend his World Championship title against Nepomniachtchi in the 2023 World Chess Championship match. Carlsen said he enjoyed playing chess tournaments more than championships, and would still continue playing professional chess. His reign as World Champion officially ended in May 2023 after Ding defeated Nepomniachtchi in the match.

In August, Carlsen represented 3rd-seeded team Norway for the 44th Chess Olympiad in Chennai, India. The team significantly underperformed to finish in 59th place but Carlsen, for his part, earned an individual bronze medal for board one. Later that month, he finished clear first in the next tour major, the FTX Crypto Cup, with 16/21 in match points.

In September, he won the Julius Baer Generation Cup, winning matches against Levon Aronian, Vincent Keymer, and Arjun Erigaisi in the finals. In October, he advanced to the knockouts of the Aimchess Rapid, but was defeated by Duda in the semifinals. Finally, in November, Carlsen dominated the tour finals, winning all of his matches to reach 20/21 in match points.

Earlier in November, Carlsen represented Norway at the European Team Championship 2023. He scored an undefeated 6½/8 (+5–0=3) and earned an individual gold medal for board one. This was his first gold medal in an international team competition. Carlsen played in the Speed Chess Championship 2022, convincingly winning his matches against Gukesh Dommaraju, Caruana, and Maxime Vachier-Lagrave, but was narrowly defeated 14½–13½ by Nakamura in the finals in December.

From 26 to 30 December, Carlsen played in the World Rapid and World Blitz Chess Championships, held in Almaty, Kazakhstan. He won the rapid championship with a score of 10/13 (+8–1=4), his fourth World Rapid title. He then won the blitz championship with a score of 16/21 (+13–2=6), his sixth World Blitz title. This marked the third time in Carlsen's career that he held the triple crown.

=== Sinquefield Cup withdrawal ===
In September, Carlsen participated as a wildcard in the Sinquefield Cup 2022 as part of the Grand Chess Tour 2022. He won his first game against Nepomniachtchi, the Candidates Tournament 2022 winner. In the third game, Carlsen was defeated by American wildcard Hans Niemann, ending his 53-game unbeaten streak in classical chess in a game that chess24 described as a "stunning victory". Carlsen soon after announced his withdrawal in a tweet with a video of Portuguese football manager José Mourinho saying, "I prefer really not to speak. If I speak, I am in big trouble." Carlsen's post was widely seen by the chess community as an insinuation that Niemann cheated in some way during the game, but no evidence of cheating had been found. This was the first time in Carlsen's career to withdraw from a major event in progress, and was considered "virtually unprecedented" in top level chess.

Two weeks later, Carlsen faced Niemann in the Julius Baer Generation Cup, a leg of the Champions Chess Tour 2022, an online chess tour. Carlsen, playing as black, resigned after one move, continuing the scandal. On 26 September, Carlsen finally broke his silence and accused Niemann of cheating. Subsequently, on 20 October, Niemann filed a lawsuit against Carlsen and four other defendants, alleging five counts of action, including libel, slander, and unlawful collusion.

In August 2023, Chess.com announced that all parties involved in the lawsuit had settled; Chess.com reinstated Niemann on their platform and Carlsen admitted that there was no determinative evidence that Niemann had cheated in their Sinquefield Cup game. He promised to play against Niemann should they be paired. That December, FIDE fined Carlsen €10,000 for his withdrawal from the Sinquefield Cup, but acquitted him of all charges related to his allegations against Niemann.

== 2023 ==
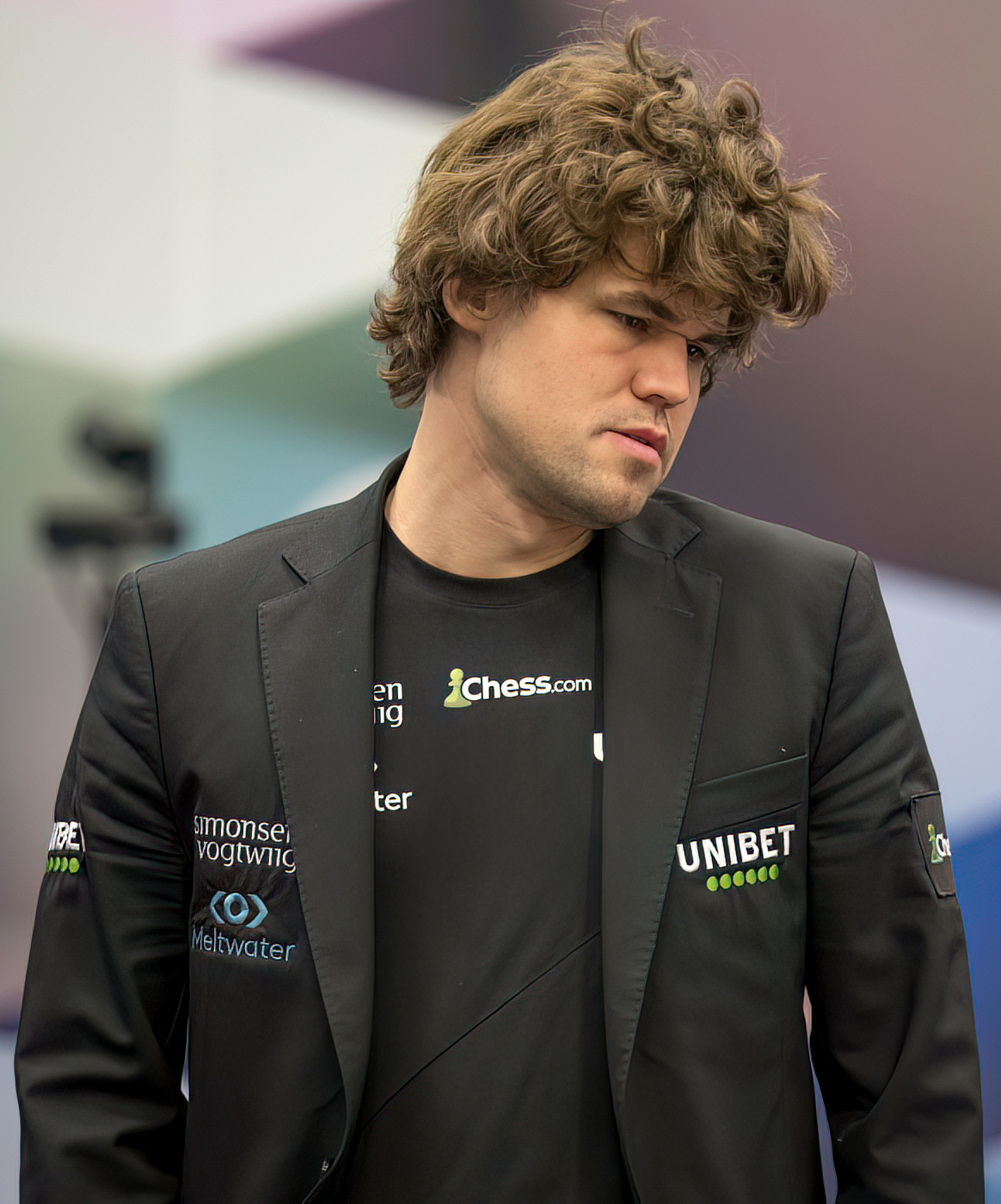
Carlsen at the Tata Steel Chess Tournament 2023

In January, Carlsen participated in the Tata Steel Chess Tournament. For the first time since 2015, he lost consecutive games, first to Anish Giri and then to Nodirbek Abdusattorov. He recovered and finished in joint 2nd with Abdusattorov, a half point behind tournament winner Giri.

Carlsen competed in the Norway Chess tournament, and performed poorly with a winless score of 11½/27 (+0–1=8), losing a game to Fabiano Caruana. He finished in 6th place out of 10, helped by his 7/8 score in the armageddon games.

Carlsen competed in two Grand Chess Tour Rapid & Blitz events as a wildcard. In May, Carlsen won the Superbet Rapid & Blitz Poland, with a score of 24/36, scoring 10/18 in rapid and 14/18 in blitz. In July, Carlsen won the SuperUnited Rapid and Blitz Croatia with a score 26/36 (11/18 in rapid, 15/18 in blitz), 3½ points ahead of runner-up Ian Nepomniachtchi.

In the Chess World Cup 2023, Carlsen reached the finals by winning his matches against Levan Pantsulaia, Aryan Tari, Vincent Keymer (in tiebreaks), Vasyl Ivanchuk, Gukesh Dommaraju, and Nijat Abasov. Carlsen was sickened by food poisoning during the tournament. In the finals against R Praggnanandhaa, Carlsen won during the tiebreaks to claim his first World Cup title. With this tournament win, Carlsen qualified for the Candidates Tournament 2024, but he declined his invitation.

Carlsen reached the finals of the Speed Chess Championship 2023 by dominating his matches against Vidit Gujrathi, Nepomniachtchi, and So. In the finals in October, he faced reigning-champion Nakamura in a rematch of the previous edition's finals. This time, it was Carlsen who narrowly won 13½–12½ to claim his third Speed Chess Championship. Later that month, Carlsen played in the Qatar Masters 2023. He had a very poor event, finishing on 6/9 (+5–2=2), losing 17 rating points. Notably, he was "completely crushed" in round two by 2512-rated Alisher Suleymenov, his lowest-rated loss in the past 15 years.

Throughout the year, Carlsen played in five of the six legs of the Champions Chess Tour 2023. He won three of them — the Airthings Masters, Aimchess Rapid, and Julius Baer Generation Cup — defeating Hikaru Nakamura, Wesley So, and Alireza Firouzja, respectively, in the grand finals. In the Chessable Masters, he was knocked out by Nakamura in the losers final and in the AI Cup, he lost to Maxime Vachier-Lagrave in the grand final. In December, Carlsen played the tour finals at Toronto. tying for first with So in the preliminary stage with 6/7 in match points. Then, he defeated Fabiano Caruana in the semifinals and So in the finals, both in straight sets, to win his third Champions Chess Tour title.

From 26 to 30 December, Carlsen played in the World Rapid and World Blitz Championships, held in Samarkand, Uzbekistan. He won the rapid championship with an undefeated score of 10/13 (+7–0=6), his 5th World Rapid title. He also won the blitz championship with a score of 16/21 (+12–1=8), to claim his 7th World Blitz title and fourth World Rapid/Blitz double.

== 2024 ==
In February, Carlsen co-organized and played in the Freestyle Chess G.O.A.T. Challenge, the first ever classical Chess960 super-tournament. He won the main event and reached the finals by defeating Alireza Firouzja in the quarterfinals (in tiebreak) and Nodirbek Abdusattorov in the semifinals. He then Fabiano Caruana 1½ – ½ in the finals to win the tournament.

In May, Carlsen played the GCT Superbet Rapid and Blitz Poland as a wildcard. He won the tournament with 26/36, going 12/18 in rapid and 14/18 in blitz. Heading into the final day, he was 2½ points behind Wei Yi, but came back with a 10-game win streak to finish half a point ahead. Carlsen then played in Norway Chess 2024 from 29 May – 7 June. He won the event with a score of 17½/30 (+3–1=6), losing to R Praggnanandhaa, but winning against Firouzja, Caruana, and World Champion Ding Liren. This was his 6th Norway Chess title.

Carlsen reached the final-four of the Speed Chess Championship 2024 by winning matches against Minh Le and Arjun Erigaisi. The live finals held in Paris was highly anticipated due to his semi-final match against Hans Niemann, their first in-person encounter since Carlsen's unsubstantiated cheating accusations. Carlsen defeated Niemann 17½–12½ and then dominated Firouzja in the finals 23½–7½, winning his fourth Speed Chess Championship. Later that month, Carlsen represented sixth-seeded team Norway at the 45th Chess Olympiad in Budapest, Hungary. The team finished in 14th place among the 188 participating countries. Carlsen, for his part, finished with a score of 6/8 (+5–1=2), winning an individual bronze medal for board one.

Throughout the year, Carlsen played in all four legs of the Champions Chess Tour 2024. He won two of them — the Chessable Masters and Julius Baer Generation Cup — defeating Firouzja in the grand final of both events. In the Chess.com Classic, he lost to Firouzja in the grand final and in the Crunchlabs Masters, he was knocked out by Wesley So in elimination round 2. In December, Carlsen played in the tour finals in Oslo. He advanced to the playoffs by scoring 6/7 in match points in the initial round-robin stage. Then, he defeated Maxime Vachier-Lagrave 3½–1½ in the semifinals and Ian Nepomniachtchi 4–1 in the finals to win his fifth Champions Chess Tour title.

From 26 to 31 December, Carlsen played in the World Rapid and World Blitz Championships at New York. After round 6 of the rapid championship, Carlsen was warned and fined US$200 for wearing jeans, a dress code violation. He refused to change his jeans after being given the opportunity, causing him to not be paired for round nine. In protest, he withdrew himself from both the Rapid and the blitz championships. Prior to his forfeit, he had done poorly, scoring 5/8 (+3–1=4) and losing 19 rapid rating points.

After a loosening of the dress code, Carlsen reversed his decision and announced he would take part in the blitz championship. He advanced to the eight-player knockout after finishing in a large tie for 1st on 9½/13 (+6–0=7) in the preliminary stage. He defeated Niemann in the quarterfinals and Jan-Krzysztof Duda in the semifinals matches. In the finals against Nepomniachtchi, he took a 2–0 lead, but Nepomniachtchi won two games on demand and the match remained deadlocked after seven games. The two requested that they share the title, which FIDE agreed to, receiving widespread criticism from the chess community.

== 2025 ==
From 26 May to 6 June 2025, Carlsen played in Norway Chess 2025. A critical moment occurred in round six when Carlsen had a decisive advantage against Gukesh Dommaraju, but ended up losing after a dramatic turnaround. Distraught from the loss, Carlsen slammed the table, a moment that went viral on social media. However, he recovered to win his 7th Norway Chess title with 16/30 (+3–1=6), with wins over Gukesh, Arjun Erigaisi, and Fabiano Caruana.

In July, Carlsen played in the GCT SuperUnited Rapid & Blitz Croatia as a wildcard. He won the tournament with a score of 22½/36, scoring 10/18 in rapid and 12½/18 in blitz, finishing 2½ points ahead of runner-up Wesley So. In October, Carlsen won the Clutch Chess Champions Showdown in St. Louis, with a score of 25½/36.

Carlsen was announced as the second chess player to be signed by Dutch esports organization Team Liquid, after Fabiano Caruana. As part of the deal, Carlsen would represent Liquid during the Champions Chess Tour 2025. Carlsen won both legs of the tour, the Chessable Masters and Chess.com Classic, defeating Hikaru Nakamura and Maxime Vachier-Lagrave, respectively, in the grand finals. Then, from 29 July to Aug 1, Carlsen represented Liquid at the inaugural Esports World Cup chess event. After advancing to the playoffs, he reached the finals by defeating Nihal Sarin and Nakamura. He then defeated Alireza Firouzja in the finals across two sets to become the first-ever Chess Esports World Cup Champion and win US$250,000.

Throughout the year, Carlsen participated in the Freestyle Chess Tour, a novel series of elite Chess960 tournaments. In the first leg at Wangels in February, he was eliminated by eventual winner Vincent Keymer in the semifinals but then beat Javokhir Sindarov in the 3rd place match. In April, he won the second leg in Paris, defeating Nakamura in the finals. Later that month, he won the Grenke Freestyle Open in Karlsruhe, recording a perfect score of 9/9, two points clear of the field. A very rare achievement for an elite tournament, this result is considered one of the greatest tournament performances of all time. In July, he played in the fourth leg in Las Vegas. His group stage result limited him to a 3rd-place finish at best, which he managed by winning all of his knockout matches. In December, he played in the tour finals in Cape Town where he was defeated by Levon Aronian 1½ – ½ in the finals. However, due to his significant lead in tour points, he was still crowned the Freestyle Tour Champion.

From 26 to 30 December, Carlsen played in the World Rapid and World Blitz Championships, held in Doha, Qatar. He won the rapid championship with a score of 10½/13 (+9–1=3), a full point clear of the field, for his sixth World Rapid title. Then, in the blitz championship, he placed 3rd in the preliminary stage on 13½/19 (+11–3=5) to advance to the four-player knockout. There, he defeated Caruana 3–1 in the semifinals and Abdusattorov 2½–1½ in the finals to claim his ninth World Blitz title and fifth World Rapid/Blitz double.

== 2026 ==
Carlsen reached the final-four of the Speed Chess Championship 2025 (Note: Although this was the 2025 edition of the event, the live finals occurred in 2026.) by winning matches against José Martínez Alcántara and Fabiano Caruana. In the live finals in February at London, he defeated Denis Lazavik 17–9 in the semifinals and Alireza Firouzja 15–12 in the finals, winning his fifth Speed Chess Championship. Later that month, he won the FIDE Freestyle Chess World Championship 2026. After qualifying for the knockout stage, he beat Nodirbek Abdusattorov in the semifinals and Caruana in the final to win his 21st world championship title.

In April, Carlsen played in the Grenke Freestyle Open at Karlsruhe, finishing in a tie for 3rd place on 7/9 (+5–0=4). He then won the online Chess.com Open, defeating Jan-Krzysztof Duda in the grand final. The next week, he returned to classical chess at the TePe Sigeman Chess Tournament 2026 in Malmo, where he tied for first place with Arjun Erigaisi on 5/7 (+4–1=2), with a three-game win streak in rounds 5 to 7. He then defeated Erigaisi 2–1 in blitz tiebreaks to win the tournament.

Carlsen then went on to play at Norway Chess 2026, where he struggled and finished in 4th place with 13/30 (+3–4=3). His losses were to Firouzja, Wesley So, and twice to tournament winner R Praggnanandhaa, but he won once against Firouzja and twice against a struggling World Champion Gukesh Dommaraju. This marked Carlsen's first time losing four games in a classical tournament since Norway Chess 2015.

In June, Carlsen represented WR Chess in the World Rapid & Blitz Team Championships at Hong Kong. He had a very poor result in rapid, dropping 29 points and losing four consecutive games, his first time doing so since 2003, when he was 12 years old.

At the 2026 Esports World Cup in August, Carlsen defended his title, going unbeaten throughout the event with wins against Andrey Esipenko and Hans Niemann in the group stage, Nihal Sarin in the quarter-final, Firouzja in the semi-final, and Lazavik over two sets in the final. In September, Carlsen represented the Alpine APL Pipers in the Global Chess League 2026. His team reached the finals of the event, where they lost to the Ganges Grandmasters.
