= 2019 in chess =

Major chess events that took place in 2019 include the Tata Steel, Shamkir Chess, Grenke Chess Classic and Norway Chess, all won by World Champion Magnus Carlsen.

== Events ==
12 December – The United Nations General Assembly approves a resolution designating 20 July as "World Chess Day", marking the date of the establishment of the International Chess Federation (FIDE) in Paris on 20 July 1924.

== 2019 tournaments ==
=== Supertournaments ===
Tournament	City	System	Dates	Players (2700+)	Winner	Runner-up	Third
Tata Steel Masters	(Netherlands) Wijk aan Zee	Round robin	12–27 Jan	14 (12)	(Norway) Magnus Carlsen	(Netherlands) Anish Giri	(Russia) Ian Nepomniachtchi
Tata Steel Challengers	(Netherlands) Wijk aan Zee	Round robin	12–27 Jan	14 (0)	(Belarus) Vladislav Kovalev	(Russia) Andrey Esipenko	(Hungary) Benjamin Gledura
Prague Chess Festival	(Czech Republic) Prague	Round robin	6–15 Mar	10 (8)	(Russia) Nikita Vitiugov	(India) Vidit Gujrathi	(Poland) Radosław Wojtaszek
Shamkir Chess	(Azerbaijan) Shamkir	Round robin	31 Mar – 9 Apr	10 (10)	(Norway) Magnus Carlsen	(China) Ding Liren	(Russia) Sergey Karjakin
Shenzhen Masters	(China) Shenzhen	Round robin	17–Apr	6 (6)	(Netherlands) Anish Giri	(India) Pentala Harikrishna	(China) Ding Liren
Grenke Chess Classic	(Germany) Baden-Baden	Round robin	20–29 Apr	10 (6)	(Norway) Magnus Carlsen	(United States) Fabiano Caruana	(Germany) Arkadij Naiditsch
Norway Chess	(Norway) Stavanger	Round robin	4–15 Jun	10 (10)	(Norway) Magnus Carlsen	(Armenia) Levon Aronian	(China) Yu Yangyi
Poykovsky Chess Tournament	(Russia) Poykovsky	Round robin	6–15 Jun	10 (3)	(Russia) Vladislav Artemiev	(Russia) Dmitry Jakovenko	(Croatia) Ivan Šarić
Netanya International Chess Festival	(Israel) Netanya	Round robin	23 Jun – 2 Jul	10 (3)	(Israel) Boris Gelfand	(United States) Leinier Domínguez	(Ukraine) Pavel Eljanov
Croatia Grand Chess Tour	(Croatia) Zagreb	Round robin	26 Jun – 8 Jul	12 (12)	(Norway) Magnus Carlsen	(United States) Wesley So	(Armenia) Levon Aronian
Dortmund Sparkassen Chess Meeting	(Germany) Dortmund	Round robin	13–21 Jul	8 (5)	(United States) Leinier Domínguez	(Russia) Ian Nepomniachtchi	(Poland) Radosław Wojtaszek
Biel Chess Festival	(Switzerland) Biel	Round robin	21–30 Jul	8 (2)	(India) Vidit Gujrathi	(United States) Sam Shankland	(Hungary) Peter Leko
Sinquefield Cup	(United States) St. Louis	Round robin	17–29 Aug	12 (12)	(China) Ding Liren	(Norway) Magnus Carlsen	(India) Viswanathan Anand
London Chess Classic	(England) London	Knockout	2–8 Dec	4 (4)	(China) Ding Liren	(France) Maxime Vachier-Lagrave	(Norway) Magnus Carlsen

=== Open events ===
Tournament	City	System	Dates	Players	Winner	Runner-up	Third
Gibraltar Chess Festival	Gibraltar	Swiss	21–31 Jan	252	(Russia) Vladislav Artemiev	(India) Karthikeyan Murali	(Russia) Nikita Vitiugov
Aeroflot Open	(Russia) Moscow	Swiss	18–28 Feb	101	(Estonia) Kaido Külaots	(Armenia) Haik Martirosyan	(India) Krishnan Sasikiran
European Individual Chess Championship	(North Macedonia) Skopje	Swiss	18–29 Mar	361	(Russia) Vladislav Artemiev	(Sweden) Nils Grandelius	(Poland) Kacper Piorun
Reykjavik Open	(Iceland) Reykjavík	Swiss	8–16 Apr	238	(Romania) Constantin Lupulescu	(Iran) Alireza Firouzja	(Sweden) Nils Grandelius
GRENKE Chess Open	(Germany) Karlsruhe	Swiss	18–22 Apr	904	(Germany) Daniel Fridman	(Ukraine) Anton Korobov	(Germany) Andreas Heimann
World Open	(United States) Philadelphia	Swiss	2–7 Jul	227	(Vietnam) Lê Quang Liêm	(United States) Jeffery Xiong	(Armenia) Hrant Melkumyan
Riga Technical University Open	(Latvia) Riga	Swiss	5–11 Aug	275	(Latvia) Igor Kovalenko	(Lithuania) Šarūnas Šulskis	(Armenia) Arman Mikaelyan

=== FIDE Events ===
Tournament	City	System	Dates	Players	Winner	Runner-up	Third
FIDE Grand Prix Moscow	(Russia) Moscow	Knockout	16–30 May	16	(Russia) Ian Nepomniachtchi	(Russia) Alexander Grischuk	(Poland) Radosław Wojtaszek (United States) Hikaru Nakamura
FIDE Grand Prix Riga	(Latvia) Riga	Knockout	12–24 Jul	16	(Azerbaijan) Shakhriyar Mamedyarov	(France) Maxime Vachier-Lagrave	(Russia) Alexander Grischuk (United States) Wesley So
FIDE Grand Prix Hamburg	(Germany) Hamburg	Knockout	5–17 Nov	16	(Russia) Alexander Grischuk	(Poland) Jan-Krzysztof Duda	(France) Maxime Vachier-Lagrave (Russia) Daniil Dubov
FIDE Grand Prix Jerusalem	(Israel) Jerusalem	Knockout	11–23 Dec	16	(Russia) Ian Nepomniachtchi	(China) Wei Yi	(Czech Republic) David Navara (France) Maxime Vachier-Lagrave
FIDE World Cup	(Russia) Khanty-Mansiysk	Knockout	9 Sep – 4 Oct	128	(Azerbaijan) Teimour Radjabov	(China) Ding Liren	(France) Maxime Vachier-Lagrave
FIDE Grand Swiss	Isle of Man	Swiss	10–21 Oct	154	(China) Wang Hao	(United States) Fabiano Caruana	(Russia) Kirill Alekseenko
FIDE Fischer Random Chess Championship	(Norway) Bærum	Knockout	27 Oct – 2 Nov	4	(United States) Wesley So	(Norway) Magnus Carlsen	(Russia) Ian Nepomniachtchi
World Rapid Chess Championship	(Russia) Moscow	Swiss	26–28 Dec	204	(Norway) Magnus Carlsen	(Iran) Alireza Firouzja	(United States) Hikaru Nakamura
World Blitz Chess Championship	(Russia) Moscow	Swiss	29–30 Dec	206	(Norway) Magnus Carlsen	(United States) Hikaru Nakamura	(Russia) Vladimir Kramnik

=== Team events ===
Tournament	City	System	Dates	Teams	Winner	Runner-up	Third
World Team Chess Championship	(Kazakhstan) Astana	Round robin	5–14 Mar	10	Russia	England	China
Women's World Team Chess Championship	(Kazakhstan) Astana	Round robin	5–14 Mar	10	China	Russia	Georgia
European Team Chess Championship	(Georgia (country)) Batumi	Round robin	23 Oct – 3 Nov	40	Russia	Ukraine	England
Women's European Team Chess Championship	(Georgia (country)) Batumi	Round robin	23 Oct – 3 Nov	32	Russia	Georgia	Azerbaijan

=== Rapid & Blitz Tournaments ===
Tournament	City	System	Dates	Players	Winner	Runner-up	Third
Norway Chess Blitz Tournament	(Norway) Stavanger	Round robin	3 Jun	10	(France) Maxime Vachier-Lagrave	(Armenia) Levon Aronian	(Norway) Magnus Carlsen
Lindores Abbey Chess Stars	(Scotland) Newburgh	Round robin	25–26 May	4	(Norway) Magnus Carlsen	(China) Ding Liren	(Russia) Sergey Karjakin
Abidjan Rapid & Blitz	(Ivory Coast) Abidjan	Round robin	8–12 May	10	(Norway) Magnus Carlsen	(United States) Hikaru Nakamura	(France) Maxime Vachier-Lagrave
Paris Rapid & Blitz	(France) Paris	Round robin	27 Jul – 1 Aug	10	(France) Maxime Vachier-Lagrave	(India) Viswanathan Anand	(Russia) Ian Nepomniachtchi
Levitov Chess Week Blitz	(Netherlands) Amsterdam	Round robin	3 Aug	8	(Russia) Vladimir Kramnik	(India) Viswanathan Anand	(Russia) Alexander Grischuk
Levitov Chess Week Rapid	(Netherlands) Amsterdam	Round robin	4–6 Aug	8	(Russia) Ian Nepomniachtchi	(Russia) Alexander Grischuk	(Netherlands) Anish Giri
Saint Louis Rapid & Blitz	(United States) St. Louis	Round robin	10–Aug	10	(Armenia) Levon Aronian	(France) Maxime Vachier-Lagrave	(China) Ding Liren
Superbet Rapid & Blitz	(Romania) Bucharest	Round robin	6–10 Nov	10	(Armenia) Levon Aronian	(Russia) Sergey Karjakin	(India) Viswanathan Anand
Tata Steel Rapid & Blitz	(India) Kolkata	Round robin	8–12 May	10	(Norway) Magnus Carlsen	(United States) Hikaru Nakamura	(Netherlands) Anish Giri

== Deaths ==
- Tamar Khmiadashvili, a Georgian Woman Grandmaster with multiple wins in the Georgian Women's Championship and Women's World Senior Championship.
- 7 January – Khosro Harandi, first Iranian International Master and three-time winner of the Iranian Chess Championship, dies at age 87.
- 31 March – Eva Moser, Austria's first Woman Grandmaster and in 2006 became the first woman to win the absolute Austrian Chess Championship, dies at age 36.
- 6 July – Ragnar Hoen, Norwegian FIDE Master who won the Norwegian Chess Championship in 1963, 1978, and 1981, dies at age 78.
- 11 August – Shelby Lyman, American chess player and teacher, dies at age 82.
- 26 August – Pal Benko, Hungarian-American Grandmaster, author and composer of endgame studies, dies at age 91.
- 5 September – Nenad Šulava, Croatian Grandmaster, dies at age 56.
- 11 September – Zbigniew Szymczak, Polish International Master and Polish chess champion in 1983, dies at age 67.
- 9 September – Yoel Aloni, Israeli chess player and problemist, dies at age 90.
- 23 September – Harri Hurme, Finnish FIDE Master and International Solving Master, dies at age 74.
- 30 December – Beatriz Alfonso Nogue, Spanish Woman FIDE Master, dies at age 51.
