= Norway Chess 2022 =

Chess tournament in Stavanger, Norway

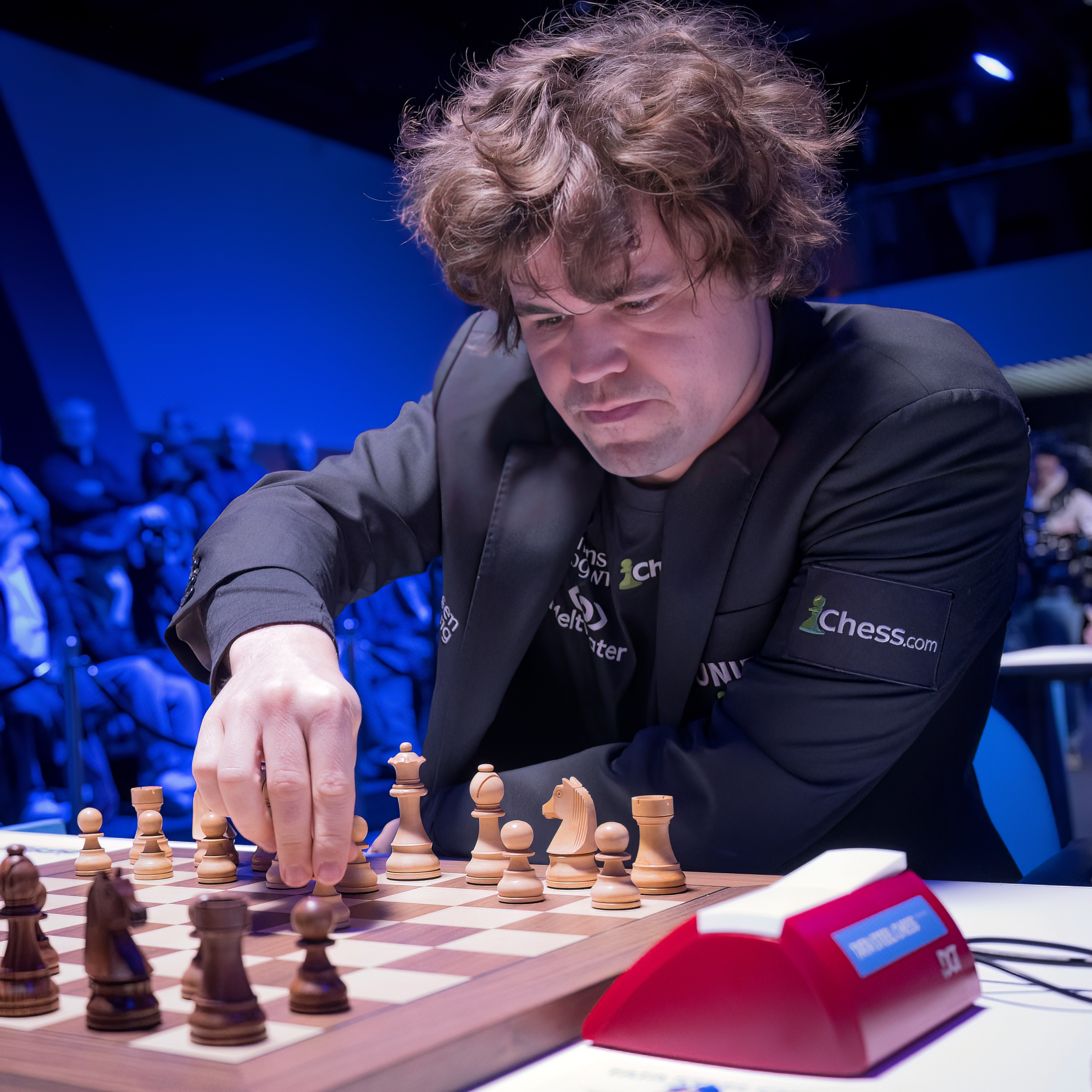
- Tournament winner Magnus Carlsen

Tournament information
- Sport: Chess
- Location: Stavanger, Norway
- Dates: 30 May–11 June
- Participants: 10 from 8 nations

Final positions
- Champion: Magnus Carlsen (NOR)

Norway Chess 2022 was 10th edition of an annual chess tournament that took place from May 30 to June 11 in Stavanger. It was won by then-world champion Magnus Carlsen for consecutive fourth time and fifth overall.

== Organization ==
Blitz tournament was used to determine the pairings, won by Wesley So. Main event used a format with an armageddon game in case of a draw in a classical game. A classical win awarded 3 points, 1.5 points were given for an armageddon win, 1 point for an armageddon loss and 0 points for a classical loss.

== Participants ==
Player	Rating	Ranking
Player	May 2022	
(Norway) Magnus Carlsen	2864	1
(Azerbaijan) Shakhriyar Mamedyarov	2770	7
(United States) Wesley So	2766	8
(Netherlands) Anish Giri	2761	9
(Azerbaijan) Teimour Radjabov	2753	13
(India) Viswanathan Anand	2751	14
(France) Maxime Vachier-Lagrave	2750	15
(China) Wang Hao	2744	18
(Bulgaria) Veselin Topalov	2730	20
(Norway) Aryan Tari	2654	88

== Standings ==
=== Blitz tournament ===
10th Norway Chess Blitz, 30 May 2022, Stavanger, Norway
	Player	Rating	1	2	3	4	5	6	7	8	9	10	Points	SB	H2H	Wins
1	Wesley So (United States)	2814		1	½	½	½	1	1	1	0	1	6½			
2	Magnus Carlsen (Norway)	2832	0		½	0	½	1	1	1	1	½	5½			
3	Anish Giri (Netherlands)	2766	½	½		1	½	½	0	1	1	0	5	22.25	1	
4	Viswanathan Anand (India)	2758	½	1	0		½	1	0	1	½	½	5	22.25	0	
5	Shakhriyar Mamedyarov (Azerbaijan)	2778	½	½	½	½		0	1	1	½	½	5	21.50		
6	Aryan Tari (Norway)	2567	0	0	½	0	1		1	0	1	1	4½			
7	Maxime Vachier-Lagrave (France)	2813	0	0	1	1	0	0		0	1	1	4			
8	Veselin Topalov (Bulgaria)	2667	0	0	0	0	0	1	1		1	½	3½			
9	Wang Hao (China)	2712	1	0	0	½	½	0	0	0		1	3	14.50	1	
10	Teimour Radjabov (Azerbaijan)	2705	0	½	1	½	½	0	0	½	0		3	14.50	0	

=== Classical tournament ===
10th Norway Chess, 31 May – 11 June 2022, Stavanger, Norway, Category XXI (2754)
	Player	Rating	1	2	3	4	5	6	7	8	9	10	Points	SB	TPR
1	Magnus Carlsen (Norway)	2864		3	1	1½	1	3	1½	1	3	1½	16½		2865
2	Shakhriyar Mamedyarov (Azerbaijan)	2770	0		3	1	1½	3	1½	1½	1	3	15½		2833
3	Viswanathan Anand (India)	2751	1½	0		3	1	1½	3	1½	1½	1½	14½		2794
4	Maxime Vachier-Lagrave (France)	2750	1	1½	0		3	1½	1½	3	1	1½	14		2794
5	Wesley So (United States)	2766	1½	1	1½	0		1½	1	1½	3	1½	12½		2752
6	Anish Giri (Netherlands)	2761	0	0	1	1	1		1½	3	3	1½	12		2753
7	Veselin Topalov (Bulgaria)	2730	1	1	0	1	1½	1		1½	1½	1	9½		2717
8	Aryan Tari (Norway)	2654	1½	1	1	0	1	0	1		1	3	9½		2725
9	Teimour Radjabov (Azerbaijan)	2753	0	1½	1	1½	0	0	1	1½		1½	8		2630
10	Wang Hao (China)	2744	1	0	1	1	1	1	1½	0	1		7½		2631
