= Andreas Heimann =

German chess player

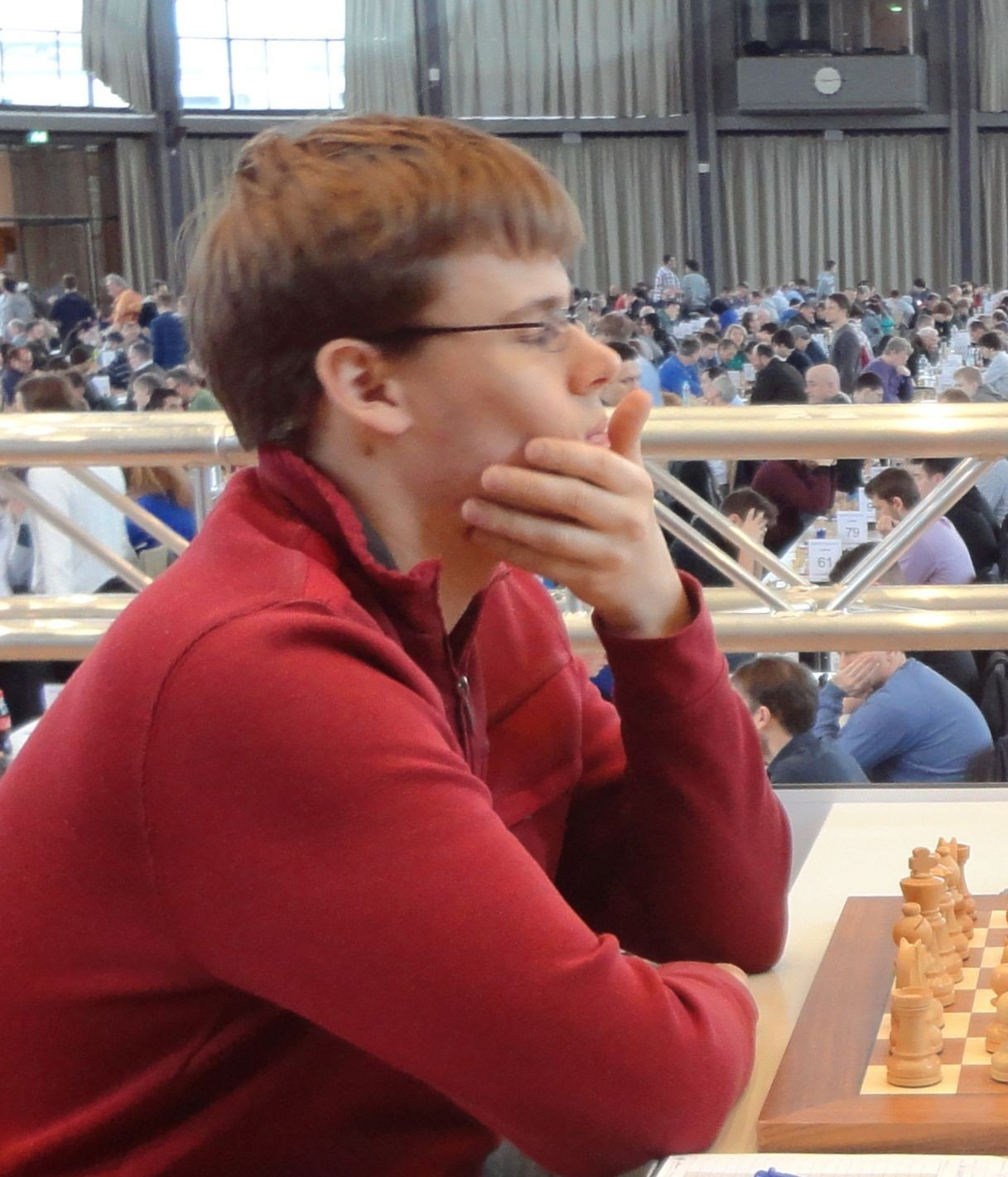
- Andreas Heimann, Karlsruhe 2016

Personal information
- Born: 10 January 1992 (age 34) Rheinfelden, Germany

Chess career
- Country: Germany
- Title: Grandmaster (2016)
- FIDE rating: 2544 (July 2026)
- Peak rating: 2603 (January 2017)

Andreas Heimann (born 10 January 1992) is a German chess grandmaster.

== Chess career ==
He played for Germany's C team at the 38th Chess Olympiad, scoring 4½/8 (+3–2=3). He earned his international master title in 2009 and his grandmaster title in 2016. He is the No. 12 ranked German player as of October 2017.
