= Beatriz Alfonso Nogue =

Spanish chess player (1968–2019)

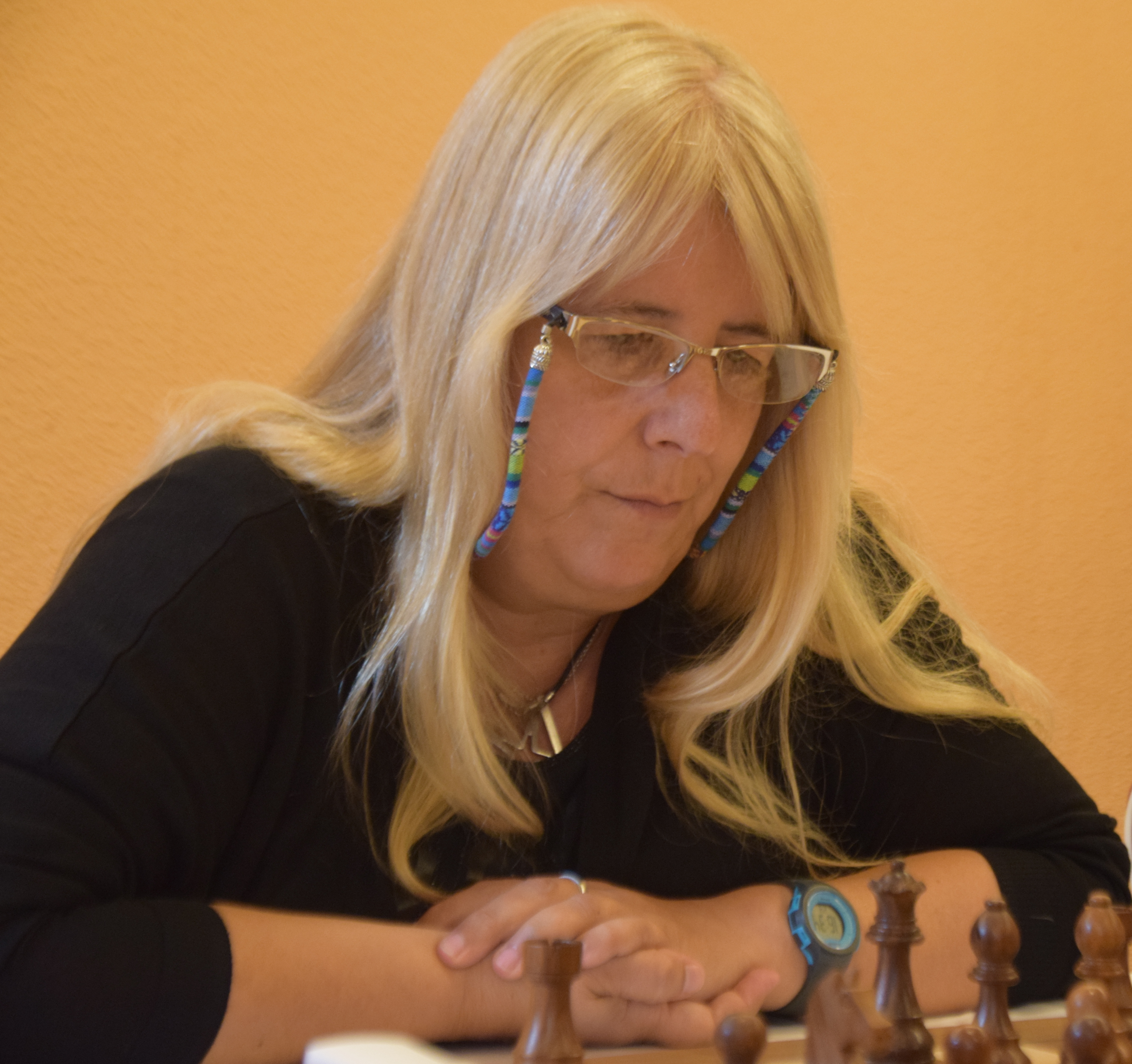
- Alfonso at the 2019 Andorra open

Personal information
- Born: May 7, 1968 Santa Coloma de Gramenet, Spain
- Died: December 30, 2019 (aged 51)

Chess career
- Country: Spain
- Title: Woman FIDE Master (2008)
- FIDE rating: 2048 (2019)
- Peak rating: 2201 (January 2002)

Beatriz Alfonso Nogue (May 7, 1968 – December 30, 2019) was a Spanish female chess player, a WFM, Woman FIDE Master. She was the national champion in 1990 in Benasque, Huesca. She was born in Santa Coloma de Gramenet.

She won the Women's Champion of Catalonia in chess three times, in the years 1990, 1996 and 2012, and was runner-up three times in 1986, 1989 and 1995. She participated representing Spain in the Chess Olympics once, in 1990 in Novi Sad.
