= Champions Chess Tour =

Series of rapid chess tournaments

The Champions Chess Tour (CCT) is a series of elite online rapid chess tournaments organized by Chess.com. It was established in 2020 by the Play Magnus Group and became part of Chess.com’s portfolio following its acquisition of the company in 2022.

== History ==
The Champions Chess Tour began in response to the outbreak of the COVID-19 pandemic in 2020. With over-the-board events canceled worldwide, World Champion Magnus Carlsen launched the Magnus Carlsen Chess Tour, a series of elite tournaments held entirely online.

In 2021, the series was rebranded as the Meltwater Champions Chess Tour following a sponsorship agreement with Norwegian software company Meltwater. The season featured ten events spread over nearly a year and attracted many of the world’s top players.

== Editions and winners ==
- 2020: (Note: In 2020, it was called the Magnus Carlsen Chess Tour) (Norway) Magnus Carlsen
- 2021: (Norway) Magnus Carlsen
- 2022: (Norway) Magnus Carlsen
- 2023: (Norway) Magnus Carlsen
- 2024: (Norway) Magnus Carlsen
- 2025: The top twelve players qualified for the Esports World Cup
- 2025–2026: Twelve players qualified for the Esports World Cup
