= FIDE Freestyle Chess World Championship 2027 =

Chess 960 Championship

The FIDE Freestyle Chess World Championship 2027 will be the fourth official World Chess960 Championship, organized by FIDE and Freestyle Chess Operations. The event will take place at the Schloss Weissenhaus resort in Wangels, Germany. Magnus Carlsen is the reigning and defending Freestyle World Chess Champion.

The event will be held alongside FIDE Women's Freestyle World Championship 2027.

== Players ==
| Qualification method | Player | Age | Rating | World Rank |
| Qualification method | Player | (November 2026) | | |
|---|---|---|---|---|
| Top 3 finishers of the Freestyle Chess World Championship 2026 | (Norway) Magnus Carlsen (winner) | 35 | 2823 | 1 |
| Top 3 finishers of the Freestyle Chess World Championship 2026 | (United States) Fabiano Caruana (runner-up) | 34 | 2783 | 3 |
| Top 3 finishers of the Freestyle Chess World Championship 2026 | (Uzbekistan) Nodirbek Abdusattorov (third place) | 22 | 2772 | 5 |
| Winner of Grenke Freestyle Chess Open 2026 | (Germany) Vincent Keymer | 21 | 2761 | 9 |
| Leader of Freestyle Friday Championship 2026 | (India) Pranav V (Feb 20 to June 26, 2026) | 19 | 2679 | 42 |
| Leader of Freestyle Friday Championship 2026 | TBD (Oct 2 to Dec 18, 2026) | | | |
| Winner of online qualifier 1 | TBD (Nov 25 to Dec 3, 2026) | | | |
| Winner of online qualifier 2 | TBD (Jan 3 to Jan 7, 2027) | | | |

== Organization ==
All 8 players will face each other in the group stage in a single round robin (all play all 7 others once) format in seven rounds. The format for matches in the knockout stage is a best-of-four series, except for the finals of fifth and seventh place that are best-of-two series.

=== Regulations ===
The time control for the Group stage is 10 minutes per player and an increment of 5 seconds per move starting from move 1 and in the Knockout stage was 25 minutes per player with an increment of 10 seconds per move starting from move 1.

In the event of a tie for qualification out of group stage, tie breaks will be applied in the following order:

1. Game Points
2. If two players tied for first or fifth place, an Armageddon will be played where the players bid a maximum time of 5 mins and the lower bid gets to play with black pieces and draw odds while being able to seek advice from the second for 5 minutes before the game started. If more than two players tied, then a Round robin mini-tournament will be played with 5 minutes per player and an increment of 3 seconds per move starting from move 1.
3. In the event of a tie for fourth place between two and four players, a double round robin mini-tournament will be played with a time control of 5 minutes and an increment of 3 seconds per move starting from move 1. If more than four players are tied, a single round-robin mini-tournament will be played with the same time control.

In the knockout stage, Armageddon will be used as the tie-breaker, with maximum bid time of 10 mins.

For the semifinal matches, the player ranked first in the Group Stage will choose an opponent from among the players ranked third and fourth, and the player ranked second will have to play against the remaining player. Similarly, for the Lower Bracket semifinals, the player ranked fifth in the Group Stage will choose an opponent from among the players ranked seventh and eighth, and the player ranked sixth will have to play against the remaining player. The player who ranked higher in the Group Stage in each matchup will have the right to choose their color for the first game of the semifinals. In the subsequent round, the player ranked higher in the Group Stage in a matchup will receive the alternate color of the one they started with in the previous round.
