= Freestyle Chess Grand Slam Tour =

Chess960 series of tournaments

- 2025
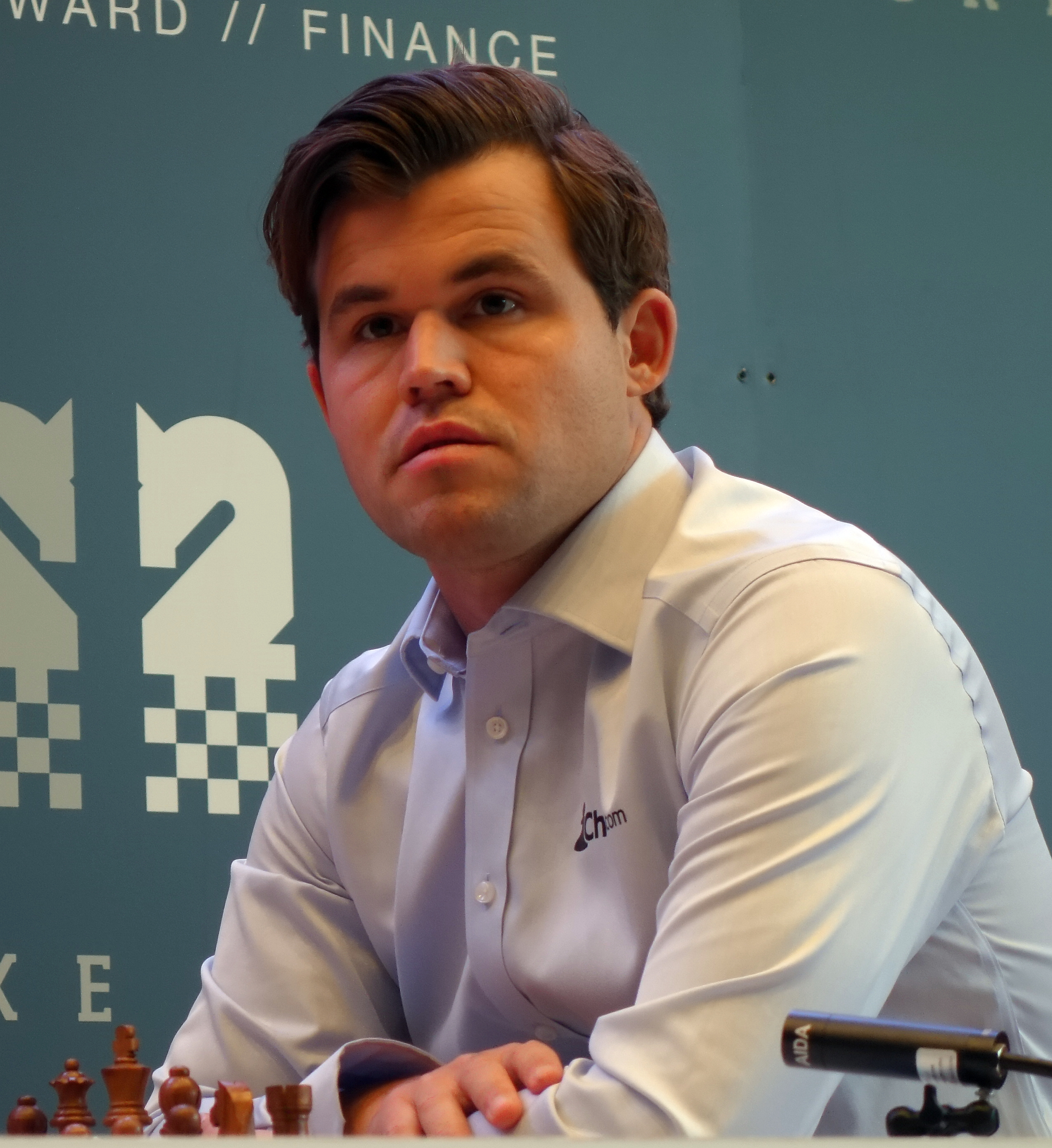
- Magnus Carlsen, the winner of the Freestyle Chess Grand Slam Tour

Tournament information
- Sport: Chess variant (Chess960)
- Location: Leg 1: Wangels, Germany; Leg 2: Paris, France; Leg 3: Karlsruhe, Germany; Leg 4: Las Vegas, United States; Final: Cape Town, South Africa
- Dates: February 7–December 11, 2025
- Host: Freestyle Chess Operations

Final positions
- Champion: Magnus Carlsen (NOR)
- Runner-up: Levon Aronian (USA)
- 3rd place: Fabiano Caruana (USA)

The Freestyle Chess Grand Slam Tour was a series of Chess960 tournaments in 2025 organized by Freestyle Chess Operations. It consisted of five "Grand Slam" tournaments following a format similar to the Freestyle Chess G.O.A.T. Challenge, held in 2024. Players scored points based on placement in each event, with the player with the highest score at the end of the year becoming the Freestyle Chess Champion.

The final event of the tour was held in Cape Town, South Africa, in December 2025. Levon Aronian went undefeated, beating Magnus Carlsen to win the event. Due to his performance in previous rounds, Carlsen, who won two of the five events, was the overall winner of the tour. The top six players — Carlsen, Aronian, Fabiano Caruana, Vincent Keymer, Javokhir Sindarov, and Arjun Erigaisi — qualified to the FIDE Freestyle Chess World Championship 2026.

== Background ==
The tour was co-founded by five-time World Chess Champion Magnus Carlsen and German investor Jan Henric Buettner. Carlsen has been an advocate for Chess960 as an alternative to classical chess that eliminates opening preparation and theory due to its randomized starting positions. While previous Chess960 tournaments largely utilized rapid time controls, Carlsen proposed using slower time controls, believing the variant requires more time for thought.

Carlsen reportedly pitched his idea of a Chess960 tournament using slower time controls to Buettner when they met at the Qatar Masters Open in 2023. "Freestyle Chess" was devised as a more marketable name for the variant, and in February 2024, the Freestyle Chess G.O.A.T. Challenge was held in Buettner's Weissenhaus resort. Following the event, plans were announced for a tour spanning multiple continents, starting with an event in India in November and further events in Weissenhaus, New York, Cartagena and Cape Town in 2025, and Australia in 2026. In April 2024, the event in India was revealed to have been put on hold.

In July 2024, Left Lane Capital invested $12 million in the venture. By October 2024, dates were confirmed for three events in Weissenhaus in February, New York in July and Cape Town in December. The prize fund for each event was set to be $750,000, with plans to raise it to $1 million for future events.

== Launch Event ==
Freestyle Chess Summit
- 2024

Tournament information
- Sport: Chess variant (Chess960)
- Location: Singapore
- Dates: November 20–22, 2024
- Format: Best of 2 games
- Host: Freestyle Chess Operations
- Participants: 2

On November 21 and 22, Carlsen played a two-game Chess960 exhibition match with Fabiano Caruana in Singapore, ahead of the World Chess Championship 2024 between Ding Liren and Gukesh Dommaraju that would take place in the same city. The first game was played on a yacht, while the second took place at Le Freeport. Carlsen won the first game and drew the second, winning 1½-½.

The event also consisted of a hand and brain match which was played on November 20, wherein Carlsen and Caruana were the "brains", and teamed up with Tania Sachdev and Maurice Ashley, who were the "hands", respectively; Carlsen and Sachdev won the match 2–0.

== Format ==
=== Play-ins ===
One player qualifies to each Grand Slam via an online play-in held on Chess.com. The play-ins consist of three stages:

- Eligible non-titled players compete in two nine-round Swiss qualifiers, with a time control of 10+2. The top three players in each qualifier advance to the next stage.
- Titled players and the six qualifiers compete in a nine-round Swiss, with a time control of 10+2. The top four players advance to the next stage.
- 12 players are invited by the organizers to the single-elimination knockout stage, joined by the four qualifiers. Matches consist of two games, with a time control of 15+3. If the match ends in a tie, two 5+2 blitz games are played. If a tie persists, one armageddon game with bidding is played.
- The winner of the knockout stage qualifies to the Grand Slam.

=== Grand Slams ===
The format of the Grand Slams underwent multiple changes, involving the players themselves in a democratic process but also motivated through better mainstream marketability.

Each grand slam begins with a rapid round-robin stage. The time control for the round-robin stage is 10 minutes with an increment of 10 seconds per move. No draw offers are allowed until move 40.

All eliminated players are required to perform commentary for the knockout stage. Refusal to do so results in a 50% reduction of their prize money.

In all matches, no draw offers are allowed until after move 40. The higher-seeded player starts the match with black in the first game. In the event of a tie, the tiebreak is two 10+10 rapid games followed by two 5+2 blitz games if the tie persists, and then one armageddon game with bidding.

==== Weissenhaus and Paris Grand Slam: Single-Elimination ====
The first grand slam had 10 participants. Afterwards, the number of participants was increased to 12 for the following grand slam.

The players finishing 1–8 in the round robin stage qualified for the single-elimination classical time control stage, with players 1-4 being seeded. Starting with player 1, they choose their opponent for the quarter finals from players 5–8. In the semifinals, the winners of the quarterfinals involving players 1 and 4 faced each other, while the winners of the quarterfinals involving players 2 and 3 played the other match. The losers from the quarter-finals determined their final rankings in a fifth-place play-off, while losers from the semi-finals met in a third-place play-off.

The players finishing 9–12 in the round robin stage played a separate single-elimination classical time control stage for 9th place. Similar to above, players 9 and 10 were seeded with player 9 choosing their opponent from players 11 and 12. The winners played a match for 9th place, while the losers finished in a joint 11th place.

Each match in the classical time control stage was a best of two games. The time control was 90 minutes with an increment of 30 seconds per move.

==== New Double-Elimination Format ====
Starting with the fourth leg, the format underwent a significant change.

The overall schedule was shortened by one day. For that, all matches were changed to rapid time control with one match taking a single day.

The players will be split into two groups for the round-robin stage.

In the elimination stage, all losing players continue playing after their first loss, opening the possibility to still play for third place.

==== Prize money and qualification methods ====
Only the winner of the play-ins qualifies, the rest of the participants are determined by other qualification criteria and wildcards. For the final grand slam, the 12 players with the most accumulated grand slam points up to that point are qualified.

Prize money is awarded as follows:

Place	Prize money (Leg 1)	Prize money (Legs 2-4 and Final)
1st	$200,000	$200,000
2nd	$140,000	$140,000
3rd	$100,000	$100,000
4th	$60,000	$60,000
5th	$50,000	$50,000
6th	$40,000	$40,000
7th	$30,000	$30,000
8th	$20,000	$20,000
9th	$12,500	$15,000
10th	$7,500	$10,000
11th (Note: In leg 1, there were only 10 participants. In legs 2-4 and the grand slam final, two players finish in a joint 11th place.)	n/a	$7,500

The winner of the Tour received $100,000, with $50,000 for second place and $25,000 for third.

The scoring system over the whole tour is described in § Standings below.

== Schedule ==
Dates	Host city	Winner	Runner-up	Third place	Report
February 7–14	(Germany) Wangels	(Germany) Vincent Keymer	(United States) Fabiano Caruana	(Norway) Magnus Carlsen	Report
April 8–15	(France) Paris	(Norway) Magnus Carlsen	(United States) Hikaru Nakamura	(United States) Fabiano Caruana	Report
April 17–21	(Germany) Karlsruhe	(Norway) Magnus Carlsen	(Iran) Parham Maghsoodloo	(FIDE) Andrey Esipenko (Germany) Frederik Svane	Report
July 16–20	(United States) Las Vegas	(United States) Levon Aronian	(United States) Hans Niemann	(Norway) Magnus Carlsen	Report
December 8–11	(South Africa) Cape Town	(United States) Levon Aronian	(Norway) Magnus Carlsen	(Germany) Vincent Keymer	

While a Grand Slam was originally scheduled to take place in Delhi from September 17 to 24, Buettner stated in an interview that the venue might be changed due to lack of investor interest. As of April 18, the Delhi event was no longer listed on the official website. Buettner confirmed on June 26 that the Delhi event was cancelled.

On April 11, Buettner announced that the fourth Grand Slam, originally set for New York, would be moved to Las Vegas, and be reduced to a five-day event with a shorter time control and more games per day.

Additionally, it was announced that at least one Grand Slam per calendar will be an open tournament, beginning with the Grenke Freestyle Chess Open on April 17–21, 2025 that replaced the Classic tournament at the annual Grenke Chess Festival.

== Standings ==
=== Scoring system ===
Grand slam points are awarded to the top ten players in each Grand Slam as well as the 2025 Grenke Freestyle Chess Open. In the Grand Slam Final, double points are awarded.

Points awarded	1st	2nd	3rd	4th	5th	6th	7th	8th	9th	10th
Grand Slam Legs 1–4	25	18	15	12	10	8	6	4	2	1
Grand Slam Final	50	36	30	24	20	16	12	8	4	2

=== Tour Standings ===
Pos.	Player	(Germany) Wangels	(France) Paris	(Germany) Karlsruhe	(United States) Las Vegas	(South Africa) Cape Town	Total points
Pos.	Player	Leg 1	Leg 2	Leg 3	Leg 4	Final	Total points
1	(Norway) Magnus Carlsen	3rd	1st	1st	3rd	2nd	121
2	(United States) Levon Aronian	9th	DNQ	33rd	1st	1st	84
3	(United States) Fabiano Caruana	2nd	3rd	7th	5th	5th	73
4	(Germany) Vincent Keymer	1st	4th	13th	9th	3rd	71
5	(Uzbekistan) Javokhir Sindarov	4th	DNQ	12th	9th	4th	46
5	(India) Arjun Erigaisi		5th	7th	6th	6th	46
7	(United States) Hikaru Nakamura	5th	2nd		4th	WD	40
8	(United States) Hans Niemann	DNQ	WD	33rd	2nd	7th	30
9	(Iran) Parham Maghsoodloo	DNQ	DNQ	2nd	WD	8th	26
10	(Germany) Frederik Svane	DNQ		3rd			15
10	(FIDE) Andrey Esipenko		DNQ	3rd	DNQ		15
12	(Uzbekistan) Nodirbek Abdusattorov	6th	8th		9th		14
13	(United States) Leinier Dominguez Perez	DNQ	DNQ	5th	9th		12
14	(Serbia) Alexey Sarana	DNQ	DNQ	5th	DNQ		10
15	(India) R Praggnanandhaa	DNQ	9th		7th		8
15	(France) Maxime Vachier-Lagrave	DNQ	6th	19th	DNQ		8
17	(FIDE) Ian Nepomniachtchi	DNQ	7th	26th	WD		6
17	(France) Alireza Firouzja	7th	WD				6
19	(India) Gukesh Dommaraju	8th	11th		WD		4
19	(United States) Wesley So			14th	8th		4
21	(Azerbaijan) Rauf Mamedov		DNQ	9th			2
22	(India) Leon Mendonca		DNQ	10th	DNQ		1
22	(Slovenia) Vladimir Fedoseev	10th		WD	DNQ		1
22	(Hungary) Richárd Rapport		10th	14th			1
25	(India) Vidit Gujrathi	DNQ	11th		13th		0
25	(Kazakhstan) Bibisara Assaubayeva			46th	13th		0
25	(United States) Ray Robson			19th	13th		0
25	(United States) Sam Sevian				13th		0
25	(India) Viswanathan Anand	WD					0
Only players who qualified for at least one grand slam or scored at least one point in an open tournament are listed. Sources:

Key
Colour	Result
Gold	Winner
Silver	Second place
Bronze	Third place
Green	Other points position
Blue	Non-scoring position
Purple	Did not qualify (DNQ)
White	Qualified for upcoming event (Q)
Blank	Withdrawn (WD)
Blank	Did not participate (empty cell)

== Dispute with FIDE ==
On December 21, 2024, the Freestyle Chess Players Club issued a press release on Twitter stating an agreement on a "friendly co-existence" with FIDE, and ongoing discussions "regarding the mutual recognition of future World Championship titles". FIDE President Arkady Dvorkovich replied stating that the press release "includes significant inaccuracies that mispresent the situation" and that FIDE will issue a further statement on the matter. Former World Champion Vladimir Kramnik questioned the recognition of "a private event (with all respect) as official WC [sic]", and the involvement of Magnus Carlsen, Hikaru Nakamura and Chess.com, and exclusion of World Champion Gukesh Dommaraju, in the agreement.

On December 27, in an interview with Levy Rozman after withdrawing from the World Rapid Championship over a dress code dispute, Carlsen accused FIDE of "going after players to get them not to sign with Freestyle" and "threatening them that they wouldn't be able to play the World Championship Cycle if they played in Freestyle". Carlsen's claims were supported by Nakamura. FIDE CEO Emil Sutovsky denied the claims on Twitter, stating "the claim that FIDE threatened players who were willing to participate in Freestyle Chess Tour is a lie" and "the only thing we insisted on - no Series or Tour can be called World Championship unless FIDE approves it. FIDE is the governing body of chess, and any World Championship should either be conducted or approved by FIDE".

In an interview with ChessBase India's Sagar Shah on January 15, 2025, President Dvorkovich reiterated Sutovsky's statement, adding "...we are very open about finding a solution, and we believe it is about the goodwill from the side of our potential partners. I took the decision to waive a possibility of sanctioning players for 2025 participating in this event since formally, according to the contracts, we can impose some sanctions. However, I do not want to go this way. I do not want to threaten players; I do not want to put them in the difficult position. It is just a signal of our goodwill to find a solution here." In a statement on January 21, FIDE said "the attempts by FCPC (Note: Freestyle Chess Players Club) to present their project as a World Championship are in contradiction with the well-established status of FIDE and its authority over world championship titles in all relevant variations of chess - including Chess960/Freestyle chess, as outlined in the FIDE Handbook" and "The steps taken by the FCPC project unavoidably lead to divisions in the chess world - and we remember all too well the unfortunate consequences of a similar split that happened in the not so distant past" (referencing the 1993 split between FIDE and the PCA). They clarified that they will not sanction players who participate in the 2025 Freestyle tour. However, players who have qualified to the ongoing 2025–26 World Championship cycle are expected to sign an additional contract, which will include "a clause indicating that participation in any alternative world chess championships in any variation of chess not approved by FIDE would lead to their withdrawal from the two consecutive FIDE World Championship cycles".

On February 10, 2025, twelve members of the Freestyle Chess Players Club met at the Weissenhaus resort with organizer Jan Henric Buettner, "unanimously deciding that the 2025 Grand Slam Tour winner will be titled Freestyle Chess Champion". They planned to form an independent association to represent their interests.

In January 2026, FIDE and Freestyle Chess signed a cooperation agreement, ending their longstanding feud with the announcement of the jointly hosted FIDE Freestyle Chess World Championship in Weissenhaus from February 13–15.
