= Paris Freestyle Chess Grand Slam =

Second leg of the Freestyle Chess Grand Slam Tour

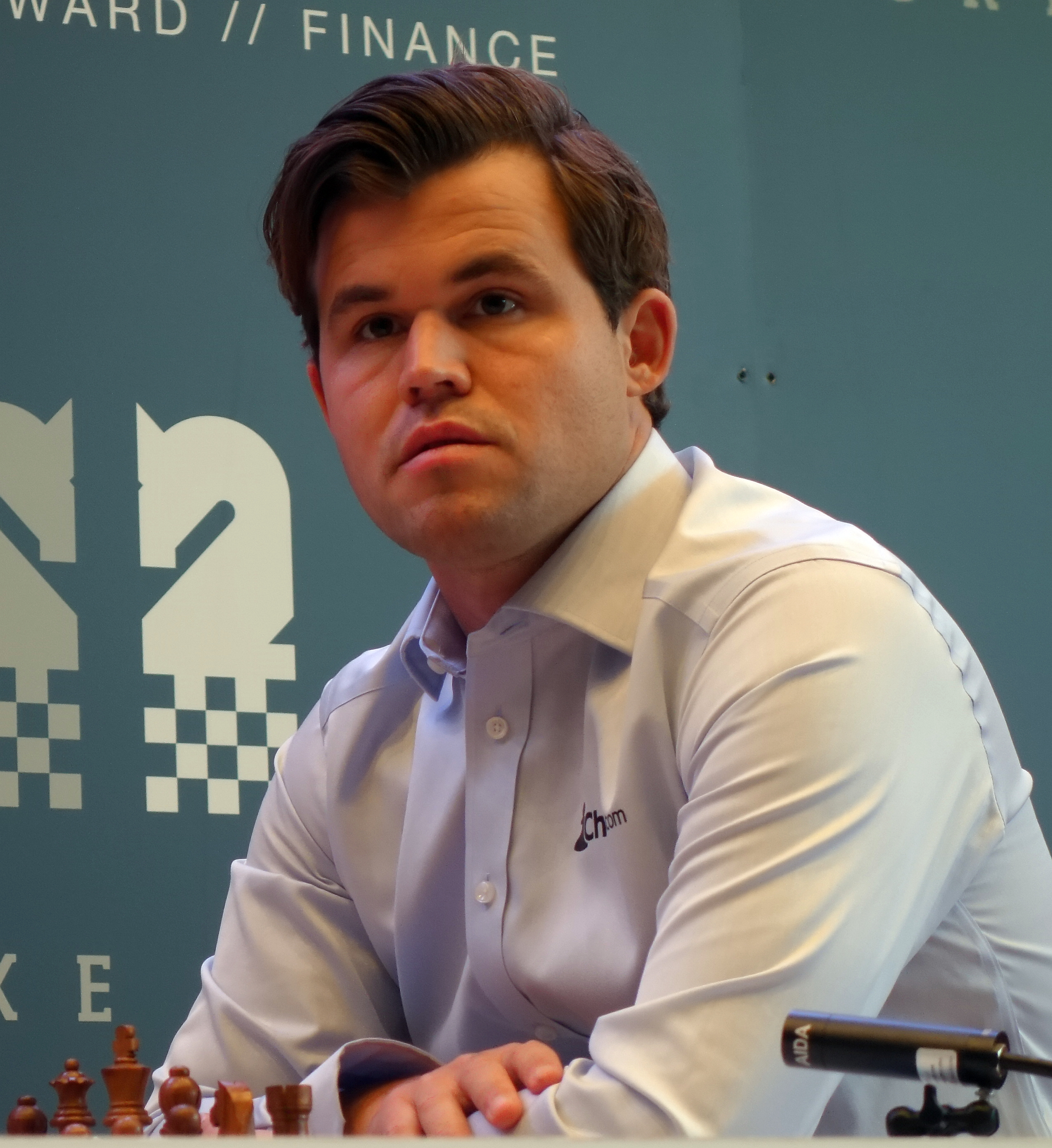
- Magnus Carlsen, the winner of the Paris Freestyle Chess Grand Slam

Tournament information
- Sport: Chess variant (Chess960)
- Location: Paris, France
- Dates: 7 April 2025–14 April 2025
- Tournament format: Single-elimination tournament with round-robin seeding round
- Host: Freestyle Chess Operations
- Venue: Pavillon Chesnaie du Roy
- Participants: 12

Final positions
- Champion: (Norway) Magnus Carlsen
- Runner-up: (United States) Hikaru Nakamura
- 3rd place: (United States) Fabiano Caruana

The Paris Freestyle Chess Grand Slam was a Chess960 tournament that took place in Paris, France from 7 April to 14 April 2025. It was the second leg of the Freestyle Chess Grand Slam Tour, a series of Chess960 tournaments being held throughout 2025.

== Background ==
After winning the first leg, Vincent Keymer went into the event as the tour leader. However, in terms of classical FIDE rankings at the time of the event, he ranked last among the qualified players.

=== Regulation changes ===
While the first leg only had 10 participants playing in the main event, the number of participants was increased to 12 for the second leg. Nevertheless, only the top eight players after the round-robin stage could qualify for the main knockout bracket, while the remaining four players played for positions 9–12 in a separate bracket.

== Format ==
The event began with a rapid round-robin stage, with a time control of 10 minutes with an increment of 10 seconds per move. The players who finished 1-8 in the round-robin stage qualified for the classical single-elimination stage, which consisted of two game matches with a time control of 90 minutes with an increment of 30 seconds per move. In the event of a tie, the tiebreak is two 10+10 rapid games followed by two 5+2 blitz games if the tie persists, and then one armageddon game with bidding.

The players finishing 1-4 chose their opponent for the quarterfinals from players 5-8. The losers from the quarter-finals determined their final rankings in fifth and seventh-place play-offs, while the losers from the semi-finals met in a third-place play-off. The players finishing 9-12 played in a separate bracket for ninth place, where the ninth placed player from the round-robin chose his opponent from players 11-12. The losers from the first round of this bracket finished in a joint eleventh place.

The starting position was selected at random by the organizers, and revealed to players 10 minutes before the scheduled start time of a match (for blitz and armageddon games, this time is reduced to 5 minutes). The players were allowed to use this time to discuss and analyze the position with other players. The starting position of classical chess is excluded from the possible starting positions.

See § Final classification for the allocation of prize money and Grand Slam points.

== Qualification ==
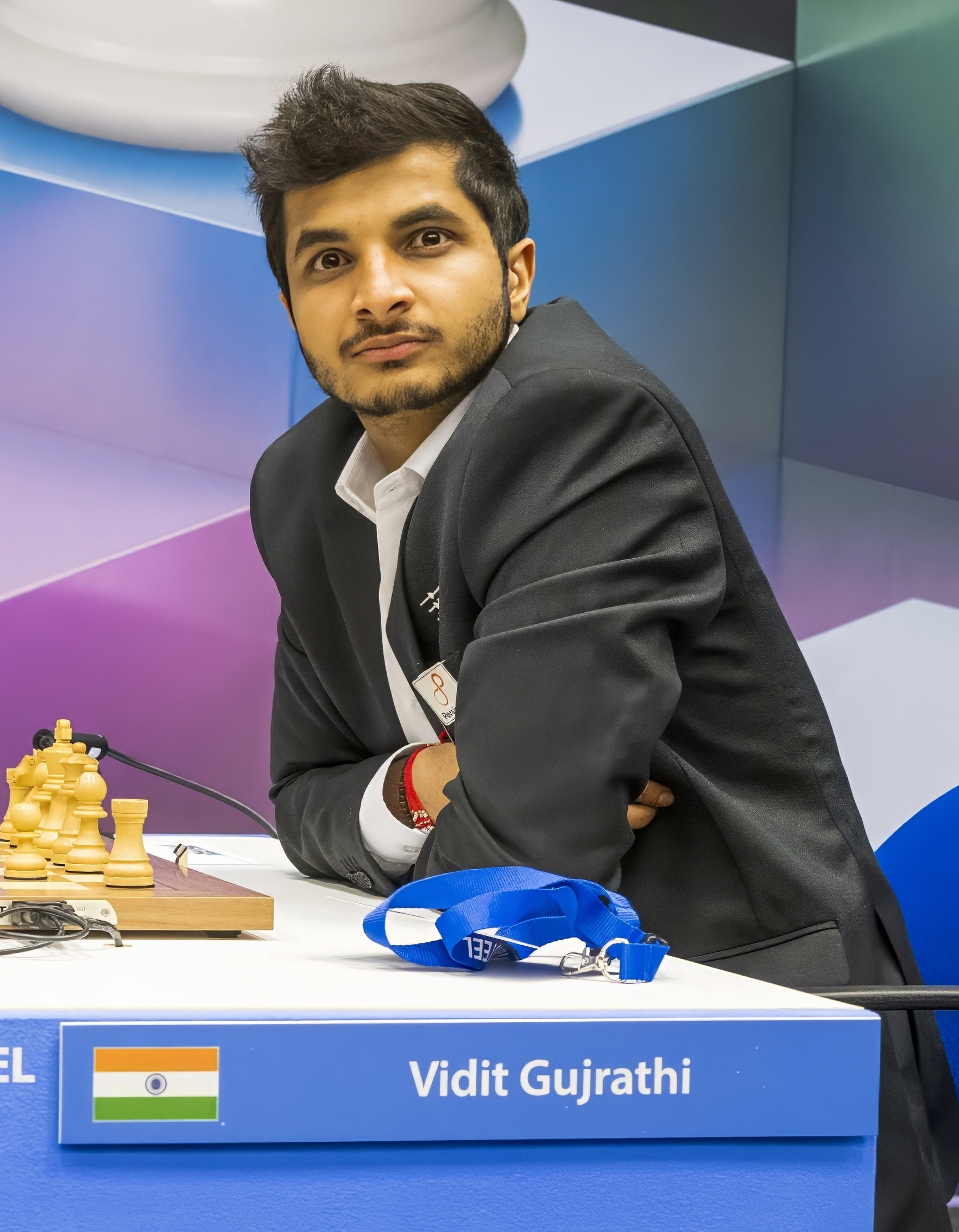
Vidit Gujrathi won the qualifier.

All qualification matches were played online and were hosted by Chess.com. All non-titled players started qualification in one of two separate open qualifier events, which were held on March 8 and March 9 respectively. 100 players participated, with the top three players from each event advancing to the Swiss stage. 202 players participated in the Swiss stage held on March 12. It was open to all titled players. The top four players, Amin Tabatabaei, Nguyễn Ngọc Trường Sơn, Rauf Mamedov and Pranesh M advanced to the 16-player knockout stage.

Twelve players of the Freestyle Chess Players Club were invited directly to the knockout stage, held on March 13 and 14. They were sorted by their March 2025 classical FIDE rankings and seeded accordingly from 1-12. Vladimir Fedoseev, who won the play-in for the first leg of the tour, was originally one of these 12 players, but was later replaced by the next-highest ranked player. That player was Javokhir Sindarov, who finished second in the play-in for the first leg of the tour and also played in the main event.

Vidit Gujrathi defeated Richárd Rapport 1½-½ in the final, and qualified for the Grand Slam. Following Alireza Firouzja's withdrawal, Rapport also qualified.

Round of 16 (Mar 13)
S3	Rauf Mamedov (AZE)	2
2	Wei Yi (CHN)	0
10	Yu Yangyi (CHN)	1½
7	Lê Quang Liêm (VIE)	2½
11	Richárd Rapport (HUN)	1½
6	Jan-Krzysztof Duda (POL)	½
S2	Nguyễn Ngọc Trường Sơn (VIE)	2
3	Shakhriyar Mamedyarov (AZE)	3
S1	Amin Tabatabaei (IRN)	2
4	Levon Aronian (USA)	0
12	Javokhir Sindarov (UZB)	0
5	Leinier Domínguez (USA)	2
S4	Pranesh M (IND)	3
1	Nodirbek Abdusattorov (UZB)	2
9	Vidit Gujrathi (IND)	1½
8	Ding Liren (CHN)	½

Quarterfinals (Mar 13)
S3	Rauf Mamedov (AZE)	1½
7	Lê Quang Liêm (VIE)	½
11	Richárd Rapport (HUN)	2
3	Shakhriyar Mamedyarov (AZE)	0
S1	Amin Tabatabaei (IRN)	1½
5	Leinier Domínguez (USA)	½
S4	Pranesh M (IND)	½
9	Vidit Gujrathi (IND)	1½

Semifinals (Mar 14)
S3	Rauf Mamedov (AZE)	1
11	Richárd Rapport (HUN)	3
S1	Amin Tabatabaei (IRN)	0
9	Vidit Gujrathi (IND)	2

Final (Mar 14)
11	Richárd Rapport (HUN)	½
9	Vidit Gujrathi (IND)	1½
Third Place Match (Mar 14)
S3	Rauf Mamedov (AZE)	0
S1	Amin Tabatabaei (IRN)	2

=== 5th-8th Place ===
The four losers from the quarterfinal round above competed in the 5th-to-8th-place bracket.

(Mar 14)
S4	Pranesh M (IND)	1½
5	Leinier Domínguez (USA)	½
7	Lê Quang Liêm (VIE)	½
3	Shakhriyar Mamedyarov (AZE)	1½

Fifth Place Match (Mar 14)
S4	Pranesh M (IND)	2
3	Shakhriyar Mamedyarov (AZE)	0
Seventh Place Match (Mar 14)
7	Lê Quang Liêm (VIE)	3
5	Leinier Domínguez (USA)	2

Note: The player listed first played as white in the first game of the match. Scores between two players adding up to 2 indicate a win under rapid time controls; adding up to 4, a win under blitz time controls; and adding up to 5, a win in armageddon with bidding.

== Main Event ==
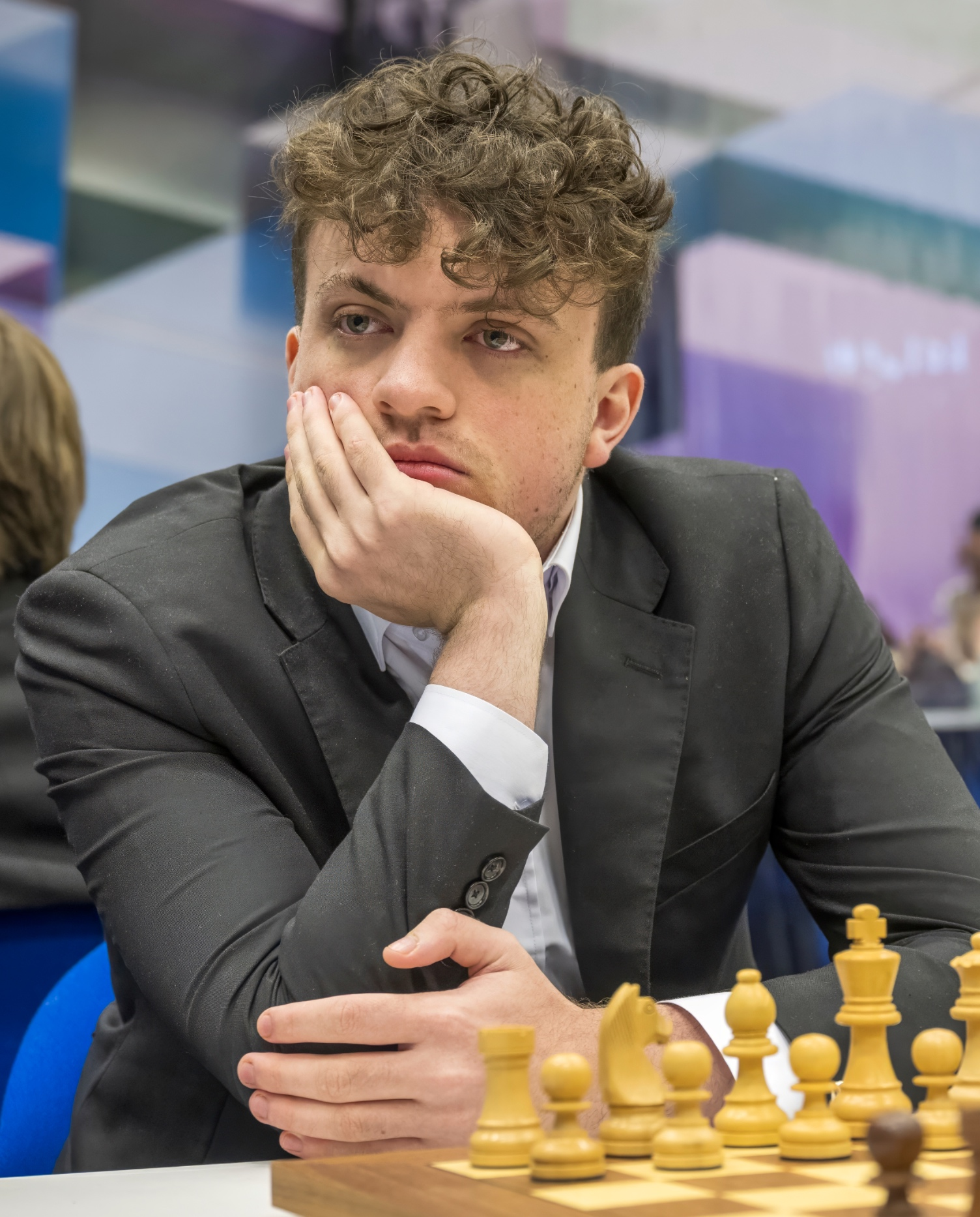
Niemann controversially withdrew from the event at the last minute.

=== Participants ===
Hans Niemann had qualified for the 2025 Grenke Chess Classic by winning the 2024 Grenke Open. However, on February 13, 2025, it was announced that a Freestyle Open would be held in place of the Classic. To compensate, Niemann received a wild card invitation to the Paris Grand Slam.

On April 5, it was reported that Niemann had withdrawn from the tournament, citing personal reasons, and would be replaced by Nodirbek Abdusattorov.

The sudden withdrawal at the last minute garnered controversy. Fans had been eagerly awaiting his anticipated meeting with Magnus Carlsen in the event, due to their controversial rivalry. He had previously stated that he was "deeply grateful" for the invitation, and would bring former world champion Vladimir Kramnik with him as his second in Paris.

It was the second withdrawal of a player in the days before the event, following Alireza Firouzja, who also cited personal reasons. Organizer Jan Henric Buettner revealed in an interview that he withdrew due to issues with the contract. He was replaced by play-in runner-up Richárd Rapport.

Qualification method	Player	Age	Classical Rating	World Ranking	Freestyle Rating
Qualification method	Player	(April 2025)			
The top three finishers in the previous Grand Slam	(Germany) Vincent Keymer (winner)	20	2718	26	2784.6
The top three finishers in the previous Grand Slam	(United States) Fabiano Caruana (runner-up)	32	2776	5	2790.6
The top three finishers in the previous Grand Slam	(Norway) Magnus Carlsen (third place)	34	2837	1	2857.2
World Chess Champion	(India) Gukesh Dommaraju	18	2787	3	2710
The two highest rated players in the February 2025 FIDE rankings	(United States) Hikaru Nakamura	37	2804	2	2808.4
The two highest rated players in the February 2025 FIDE rankings	(India) Arjun Erigaisi	21	2782	4	NA
Winner of the Tata Steel Masters 2025	(India) R Praggnanandhaa	19	2758	8	NA
Winner of the Grenke Chess Open 2024	(United States) ~~Hans Niemann~~ (withdrew)	21	2736	20	NA
Wild cards (Note: From Freestyle Chess Players Club (FCPC) members.)	(France) ~~Alireza Firouzja~~ (withdrew)	21	2757	10	2763.8
Wild cards	(France) Maxime Vachier-Lagrave	34	2722	24	NA
Wild cards	(FIDE) Ian Nepomniachtchi	34	2757	9	NA
Wild cards	(Uzbekistan) Nodirbek Abdusattorov (replacement for Niemann)	20	2773	6	2720.8
Winner of the online play-in	(India) Vidit Gujrathi (winner)	30	2720	25	NA
Winner of the online play-in	(Hungary) Richárd Rapport (runner-up, replacement for Firouzja)	29	2722	23	NA

=== Round-robin stage ===
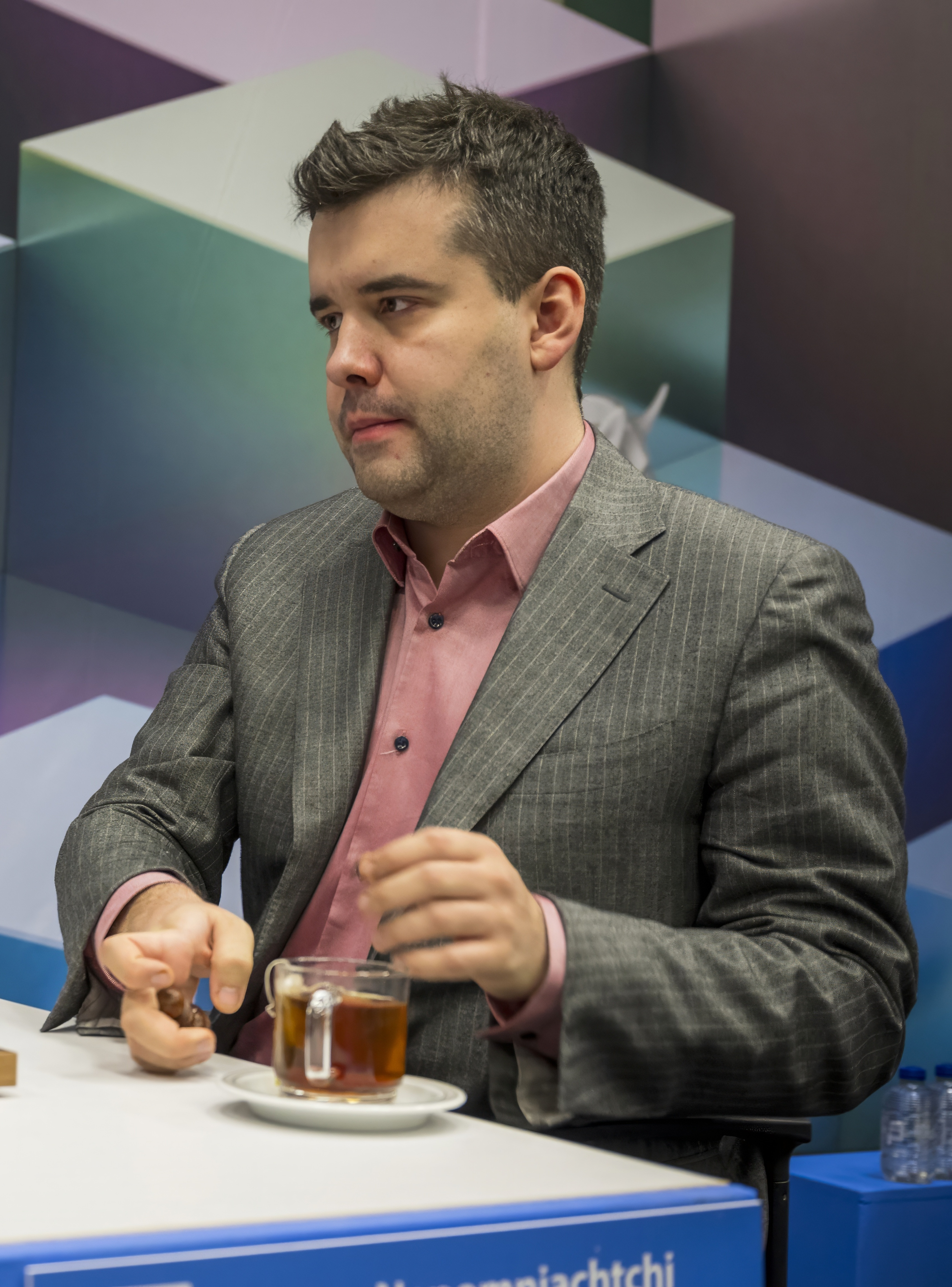
Nepomniachtchi won the round-robin stage.

Keymer finished day one outside the top 8, scoring only 2/6, half a point behind Praggnanandhaa with 2.5/6. With a strong performance on day two scoring 3.5/5, he advanced with the top 8, while Praggnanandhaa was eliminated. In round one, Carlsen and Vidit played a 116-move marathon. Vidit was on the defending side of a rook and knight versus rook endgame, and ultimately faltered on move 115. Some have speculated that this marathon game may have negatively impacted Vidit's performance in the rest of the tournament.

Abdusattorov, who got his invitation only two days prior to the start of the event, started strong and went undefeated on day one with 5 out of 6 points. However, on day two, he only scored 1.5 out of 5 points, finishing 5th overall.

Rapid round-robin, 7–8 April 2025
#	Player	1	2	3	4	5	6	7	8	9	10	11	12	Points
1	Ian Nepomniachtchi (FIDE)	*	½	1	1	½	1	1	½	0	1	1	1	8½
2	Magnus Carlsen (NOR)	½	*	½	0	1	1	½	1	1	1	1	1	8½
3	Maxime Vachier-Lagrave (FRA)	0	½	*	½	½	½	1	½	1	1	½	1	7
4	Arjun Erigaisi (IND)	0	1	½	*	1	0	1	1	½	½	0	1	6½
5	Nodirbek Abdusattorov (UZB)	½	0	½	0	*	½	1	1	0	1	1	1	6½
6	Hikaru Nakamura (USA)	0	0	½	1	½	*	0	½	½	1	1	1	6
7	Vincent Keymer (GER)	0	½	0	0	0	1	*	1	1	1	0	1	5½
8	Fabiano Caruana (USA)	½	0	½	0	0	½	0	*	1	1	1	0	4½
9	R Praggnanandhaa (IND)	1	0	0	½	1	½	0	0	*	0	0	1	4
10	Richárd Rapport (HUN)	0	0	0	½	0	0	0	0	1	*	1	1	3½
11	Gukesh Dommaraju (IND)	0	0	½	1	0	0	1	0	1	0	*	0	3½
12	Vidit Gujrathi (IND)	0	0	0	0	0	0	0	1	0	0	1	*	2

=== Knockout stage ===
The players who finished 1st-4th in the rapid round-robin stage picked their opponents from the players who finished 5th-8th. They also chose whether they would play as white or black in the first game.

Quarterfinals (Apr 9-10)
3	Maxime Vachier-Lagrave (FRA)	½
8	Fabiano Caruana (USA)	1½
2	Magnus Carlsen (NOR)	1½
5	Nodirbek Abdusattorov (UZB)	½
4	Arjun Erigaisi (IND)	½
6	Hikaru Nakamura (USA)	1½
7	Vincent Keymer (GER)	2½
1	Ian Nepomniachtchi (FIDE)	1½

Semifinals (Apr 11-12)
8	Fabiano Caruana (USA)	½
2	Magnus Carlsen (NOR)	1½
6	Hikaru Nakamura (USA)	1½
7	Vincent Keymer (GER)	½

Final (Apr 13-14)
2	Magnus Carlsen (NOR)	1½
6	Hikaru Nakamura (USA)	½
Third Place Match (Apr 13-14)
7	Vincent Keymer (GER)	½
8	Fabiano Caruana (USA)	1½

==== 5th-8th Place ====
The four losers from the quarterfinal round above compete in the 5th-to-8th-place bracket.

(Apr 11-12)
5	Nodirbek Abdusattorov (UZB)	1½
3	Maxime Vachier-Lagrave (FRA)	2½
1	Ian Nepomniachtchi (FIDE)	1½
4	Arjun Erigaisi (IND)	2½

Fifth Place Match (Apr 13-14)
3	Maxime Vachier-Lagrave (FRA)	½
4	Arjun Erigaisi (IND)	1½
Seventh Place Match (Apr 13-14)
5	Nodirbek Abdusattorov (UZB)	0
1	Ian Nepomniachtchi (FIDE)	2

==== 9th-11th Place ====
The four players who were eliminated in the round-robin stage compete in the 9th-to-11th-place bracket. The bottom two players share 11th, as they receive no tour points regardless.

(Apr 9-10)
10	Richárd Rapport (HUN)	1½
11	Gukesh Dommaraju (IND)	½
9	R Praggnanandhaa (IND)	1½
12	Vidit Gujrathi (IND)	½

Ninth Place Match (Apr 11-12)
10	Richárd Rapport (HUN)	½
9	R Praggnanandhaa (IND)	1½

Note: The player listed first played as white in the first game of the match. Scores between two players adding up to 2 indicate a win under normal time controls; adding up to 4, a win under rapid time controls; adding up to 6, a win under blitz time controls; and adding up to 7, a win in armageddon with bidding.

=== Final classification ===
Pos.	Player	Prize money	Points
1	Magnus Carlsen (NOR)	$200,000	25
2	Hikaru Nakamura (USA)	$140,000	18
3	Fabiano Caruana (USA)	$100,000	15
4	Vincent Keymer (GER)	$60,000	12
5	Arjun Erigaisi (IND)	$50,000	10
6	Maxime Vachier-Lagrave (FRA)	$40,000	8
7	Ian Nepomniachtchi (FIDE)	$30,000	6
8	Nodirbek Abdusattorov (UZB)	$20,000	4
9	R Praggnanandhaa (IND)	$15,000	2
10	Richárd Rapport (HUN)	$10,000	1
11	Gukesh Dommaraju (IND)	$7,500	0
11	Vidit Gujrathi (IND)	$7,500	0

== Tour standings after the Grand Slam ==
	Pos.	Player	Points
2	1	(Norway) Magnus Carlsen	40
1	2	(Germany) Vincent Keymer	37
1	3	(United States) Fabiano Caruana	33
1	4	(United States) Hikaru Nakamura	28
2	5	(Uzbekistan) Nodirbek Abdusattorov	12
1	5	(Uzbekistan) Javokhir Sindarov	12

Note: Only the top five positions are included.
