= Weissenhäuser Strand =

- Ortsteil of Wangels
- Interactive map of Weissenhäuser Strand
- Location within Germany Location within Schleswig-Holstein
- Coordinates: 54°18′N 10°47′E
- Country: Germany
- State: Schleswig-Holstein
- District: Ostholstein
- Municipality: Wangels
- Time zone: UTC+01:00 (CET)
  - Summer (DST): UTC+02:00 (CEST)

Weissenhäuser Strand (German Weißenhäuser Strand) is a place in Oldenburg-Land and a part of the municipality Wangels, Schleswig-Holstein, Germany. It is located at the Baltic Sea.

== History ==
The place is named after the seaside resort in Weissenhäuser Strand which was named after the Gut Weißenhaus.

The resort was built between 1971 and 1973 and nowadays has about 1,200 places for rent as apartments, bungalows or in the beach hotels.
