= Grenke Freestyle Chess Open =

Third leg of the Freestyle Chess Grand Slam Tour

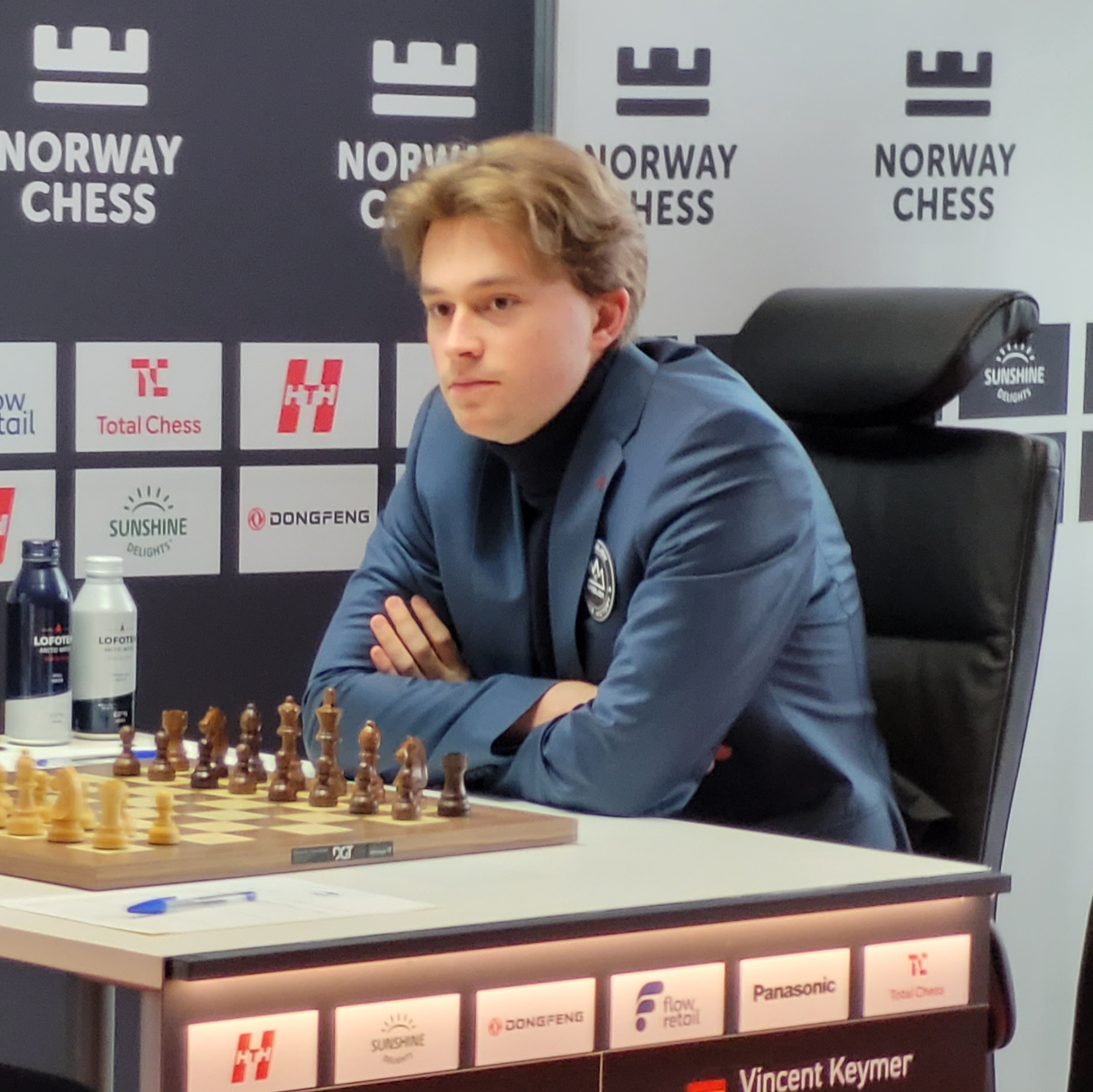
- Vincent Keymer, winner of the 2026 edition

Tournament information
- Sport: Chess variant (Chess960)
- Location: Karlsruhe, Germany
- Tournament format: 9-round Swiss-system tournament
- Host(s): Schachzentrum Baden-Baden; Freestyle Chess Operations
- Venue: Kongresszentrum Karlsruhe

2025
- Champion: Magnus Carlsen

2026
- Champion: Vincent Keymer

The Grenke Freestyle Chess Open is an annual open Chess960 tournament. It is held in Karlsruhe, Germany, concurrently with the Grenke Chess Open as part of the Grenke Chess Festival, supplanting the former round-robin Grenke Chess Classic.

The first edition took place from 17–21 April 2025. It was a part of the Freestyle Chess Grand Slam Tour, a series of Chess960 tournaments. Magnus Carlsen won with a perfect score, winning all nine of his games. Seven players tied for second place, with Parham Maghsoodloo finishing second with the best tiebreak score. The winner was set to qualify to the Las Vegas Freestyle Chess Grand Slam. Since Carlsen had already qualified from a previous event, the spot was awarded to Maghsoodloo.

The second edition was held from 2–6 April; it was won by Vincent Keymer, ahead of Maxime Vachier-Lagrave on tiebreak. Keymer qualified to the FIDE Freestyle Chess World Championship 2027, and the top three women, Harika Dronavalli, Alua Nurman, and Dinara Wagner qualified to the FIDE Women’s Freestyle Chess World Championship 2027.

== Background ==
In 2024, the traditional Grenke Chess Festival returned after a five-year hiatus. The invitational "Classic" tournament was won by Magnus Carlsen, while the Open, which was held concurrently, was won by Hans Niemann, who thereby qualified for the 2025 Classic.

On February 13, 2025, the organizers of the Festival and the Freestyle Chess Grand Slam Tour, a series of Chess960 tournaments being held throughout 2025, announced that a Chess960 open would be held in place of the Grenke Chess Classic. The new open is part of the Grand Slam Tour, with the top ten finishers scoring tour points, and the winner qualifying for the upcoming Las Vegas Grand Slam.

As part of the cooperation, Niemann, who had previously qualified for the now-cancelled Classic, was given a wild card invite to the Paris Grand Slam to compensate. He controversially withdrew from that tournament at the last minute without explanation, leading to doubts about his potential participation in Grenke. He ultimately did arrive to play in the Freestyle Open.

== Format ==
=== Qualification ===
As an open tournament, any interested chess player could participate. Players were distributed into three sections according to their classical FIDE Elo rating number and their German DWZ rating number.

- Freestyle Open A: FIDE Elo or DWZ > 1950
- Freestyle Open B: FIDE Elo and DWZ < 2000
- Freestyle Open C: FIDE Elo < 1600 and DWZ < 1400

As of 10 April 2025, 466 players had registered, with 251 of them playing in the Freestyle Open A section.

=== Tournament ===
In each of the three sections, a 9-round Swiss-system tournament was held. For each round, a random position from the 960 possible starting positions of Chess960, excluding the standard chess starting position, was drawn, which all the games in that round used. A position that is drawn in one round is be excluded for all subsequent rounds. All games use a time control of 90 minutes with an increment of 30 seconds per move.

Before rounds 2-5, any player was able switch from the Grenke Chess Open to the Freestyle Open, with points from the former tournament carried over.

Prize money and grand slam points for the Freestyle Open A section was awarded as follows:

Place	Prize money	Grand slam points
1st	€60,000	25
2nd	€40,000	18
3rd	€30,000	15
4th	€20,000	12
5th	€15,000	10
6th	€12,000	8
7th	€10,000	6
8th	€8,000	4
9th	€5,000	2
10th	€3,000	1
11th	€2,000	0
12th	€1,000	0
13th	€500	0
14th	€300	0
15th	€200	0

== 2025 ==
Leg 3 of the Freestyle Chess Grand Slam Tour. Previous- Paris Freestyle Chess Grand Slam. Next- Las Vegas Freestyle Chess Grand Slam.

Rank	Player	Rating	Round 1	Round 2	Round 3	Round 4	Round 5	Round 6	Round 7	Round 8	Round 9	Total	Tie
1	Magnus Carlsen (NOR)	2837	1 (W256)	1 (B84)	1 (W22)	1 (B32)	1 (W38)	1 (B80)	1 (W2)	1 (B9)	1 (W13)	9	52½
2	Parham Maghsoodloo (IRN)	2684	1 (W233)	½ (B223)	1 (W288)	1 (B48)	1 (W47)	1 (B10)	0 (B1)	1 (W27)	½ (B5)	7	52½
3	Andrey Esipenko (FIDE)	2696	1 (W141)	1 (B74)	½ (W48)	½ (B56)	1 (W69)	1 (B38)	1 (W11)	0 (B13)	1 (W28)	7	52
3	Frederik Svane (GER)	2668	1 (W145)	1 (B43)	½ (W52)	1 (B49)	0 (W28)	1 (B86)	1 (W64)	1 (B12)	½ (W20)	7	52
5	Leinier Dominguez Perez (USA)	2738	1 (W293)	1 (B189)	½ (W39)	½ (B40)	1 (W63)	½ (B18)	1 (W56)	1 (B30)	½ (W2)	7	50½
5	Alexey Sarana (SRB)	2672	1 (B231)	1 (W78)	1 (B187)	1 (W55)	½ (B10)	½ (W25)	½ (B27)	½ (W8)	1 (B44)	7	50½
7	Erigaisi Arjun (IND)	2782	1 (B123)	½ (W35)	1 (B81)	0 (W31)	1 (B87)	½ (W89)	1 (B60)	1 (W17)	1 (B36)	7	50
7	Fabiano Caruana (USA)	2776	1 (W292)	1 (B50)	0 (W32)	1 (B117)	1 (W186)	1 (B24)	½ (W28)	½ (B6)	1 (W37)	7	50
9	Rauf Mamedov (AZE)	2657	1 (B102)	1 (W72)	1 (B58)	½ (W41)	½ (B16)	1 (W35)	1 (B25)	0 (W1)	½ (B15)	6½	56
10	Leon Luke Mendonca (IND)	2643	1 (W201)	1 (B90)	1 (W26)	1 (B15)	½ (W6)	0 (W2)	½ (B14)	1 (W35)	½ (B19)	6½	54
11	Pranesh M (IND)	2572	1 (W180)	1 (B122)	1 (W20)	½ (B12)	½ (W37)	1 (W23)	0 (B3)	1 (W80)	½ (B16)	6½	53
12	Javokhir Sindarov (UZB)	2706	1 (B93)	1 (W155)	1 (B42)	½ (W11)	0 (B25)	1 (W58)	1 (B31)	0 (W4)	1 (B55)	6½	52½
13	Vincent Keymer (GER)	2718	1 (B172)	½ (W81)	1 (B115)	1 (W118)	½ (B18)	½ (W31)	1 (B114)	1 (W3)	0 (B1)	6½	52
14	Wesley So (USA)	2748	1 (W208)	1 (B63)	0 (W47)	½ (B43)	1 (W65)	1 (B49)	½ (W10)	½ (B40)	1 (W56)	6½	50½
14	Richard Rapport (HUN)	2722	1 (B108)	1 (W120)	1 (B114)	0 (W10)	½ (B55)	1 (W84)	½ (W18)	1 (B53)	½ (W9)	6½	50½
16	Yangyi Yu (CHN)	2714	1 (W232)	1 (B69)	1 (W186)	½ (B47)	½ (W9)	½ (B39)	½ (W40)	1 (B42)	½ (W11)	6½	50
16	David Anton Guijarro (ESP)	2639	1 (W204)	1 (B73)	½ (W33)	½ (B82)	1 (W88)	½ (B26)	1 (W34)	0 (B7)	1 (W63)	6½	50
18	Rasmus Svane (GER)	2625	1 (W212)	1 (B277)	½ (W34)	1 (B151)	½ (W13)	½ (W5)	½ (B15)	½ (B26)	1 (W67)	6½	49½
19	Maxime Vachier-Lagrave (FRA)	2722	1 (W128)	0 (B41)	1 (W123)	1 (B135)	½ (W57)	1 (B62)	1 (W39)	½ (B37)	½ (W10)	6½	49
19	Ray Robson (USA)	2692	1 (B129)	1 (W230)	0 (B11)	1 (W116)	½ (B187)	½ (W60)	1 (B81)	1 (W25)	½ (B4)	6½	49
19	Alexander Grischuk (FIDE)	2682	1 (B143)	1 (W153)	0 (B55)	1 (W72)	½ (B84)	½ (W45)	1 (B155)	1 (W51)	½ (B23)	6½	49
22	Nils Grandelius (SWE)	2640	1 (B291)	1 (W257)	0 (B1)	1 (W90)	0 (B35)	1 (W92)	1 (B103)	½ (W43)	1 (B58)	6½	48½
23	Grigoriy Oparin (USA)	2660	1 (W182)	1 (B107)	0 (W38)	1 (B166)	1 (W159)	0 (B11)	1 (W117)	1 (B61)	½ (W21)	6½	48
24	Murali Karthikeyan (IND)	2651	1 (W196)	1 (B175)	0 (W41)	1 (B77)	1 (W152)	0 (W8)	1 (B153)	1 (B38)	½ (W26)	6½	47½
25	Paulius Pultinevicius (LTU)	2558	1 (open)	½ (open)	1 (open)	1 (open)	1 (W12)	½ (B6)	0 (W9)	0 (B20)	1 (W88)	6	55½
26	Ian Nepomniachtchi (FIDE)	2757	1 (B79)	1 (W60)	0 (B10)	1 (W153)	1 (B41)	½ (W17)	½ (B46)	½ (W18)	½ (B24)	6	54
27	Matthias Blübaum (GER)	2662	1 (W148)	1 (B98)	½ (W49)	1 (B52)	1 (W29)	½ (B28)	½ (W6)	0 (B2)	½ (W50)	6	53½
27	Baadur Jobava (GEO)	2600	1 (B138)	½ (W85)	1 (B94)	1 (W44)	1 (B4)	½ (W27)	½ (B8)	½ (W36)	0 (B3)	6	53½
29	Josefine Heinemann (GER)	2342	1 (open)	½ (open)	1 (open)	1 (open)	0 (B27)	½ (W42)	½ (B89)	1 (W118)	½ (B31)	6	52½
30	David Navara (CZE)	2665	1 (B162)	1 (W76)	½ (B51)	½ (W35)	½ (B58)	1 (W41)	1 (B55)	0 (W5)	½ (B45)	6	51½
30	Aryan Chopra (IND)	2620	1 (W65)	½ (B82)	1 (W190)	1 (B7)	½ (W34)	½ (B13)	0 (W12)	1 (B57)	½ (W29)	6	51½
32	Etienne Bacrot (FRA)	2633	1 (B234)	1 (W140)	1 (B8)	0 (W1)	½ (B60)	½ (W81)	0 (B43)	1 (W92)	1 (W95)	6	51
33	Levon Aronian (USA)	2747	1 (B169)	1 (W124)	½ (B17)	½ (W39)	½ (B42)	½ (W51)	½ (B45)	1 (W71)	½ (B40)	6	50½
33	Hans Moke Niemann (USA)	2736	1 (B142)	1 (W71)	½ (B18)	1 (W51)	½ (B31)	½ (W114)	0 (B17)	1 (W120)	½ (B48)	6	50½
33	Cem Kaan Gokerkan (TUR)	2489	1 (W216)	½ (B7)	1 (W284)	½ (B30)	1 (W22)	0 (B9)	1 (W65)	0 (B10)	1 (W83)	6	50½
36	Jorden Van Foreest (NED)	2681	1 (W147)	1 (B117)	1 (W61)	0 (B38)	1 (W134)	½ (B56)	1 (W48)	½ (B28)	0 (W7)	6	50
36	Amin Tabatabaei (IRI)	2661	1 (B127)	1 (W116)	½ (B118)	1 (W223)	½ (B11)	½ (W53)	1 (B67)	½ (W19)	0 (B8)	6	50
36	Victor Mikhalevski (ISR)	2513	1 (B224)	1 (W222)	1 (B23)	1 (W36)	0 (B1)	0 (W3)	1 (B164)	0 (W24)	1 (B97)	6	50
39	Yagiz Kaan Erdogmus (TUR)	2618	1 (B253)	1 (W125)	½ (B5)	½ (B33)	1 (W82)	½ (W16)	0 (B19)	1 (W115)	½ (B43)	6	49½
39	Gata Kamsky (USA)	2603	1 (B228)	1 (W238)	½ (B44)	½ (W5)	½ (B45)	1 (W115)	½ (B16)	½ (W14)	½ (W33)	6	49½
39	Juraj Druska (SVK)	2442	1 (B220)	1 (W19)	1 (B24)	½ (B9)	0 (W26)	0 (B30)	1 (W137)	½ (W59)	1 (B91)	6	49½
42	Kacper Piorun (POL)	2577	1 (W113)	1 (B137)	0 (W12)	1 (B277)	½ (W33)	½ (B29)	1 (W82)	0 (W16)	1 (B85)	6	49
42	Jonas Hacker (GER)	2370	1 (B154)	0 (W4)	1 (B224)	½ (W14)	1 (B127)	½ (W68)	1 (W32)	½ (B22)	½ (W39)	6	49
44	Quang Liem Le (VIE)	2729	1 (W171)	1 (B86)	½ (W40)	0 (B28)	1 (W190)	½ (B50)	1 (W69)	1 (B68)	0 (W6)	6	48½
45	Tobias Kölle (GER)	2459	1 (W163)	½ (B289)	½ (W64)	1 (B122)	½ (W40)	½ (B21)	½ (W33)	1 (B125)	½ (W30)	6	48
46	Daniel Dardha (BEL)	2650	1 (B178)	½ (W94)	1 (B85)	1 (W121)	0 (B80)	1 (W57)	½ (W26)	½ (B50)	½ (W49)	6	47½
46	Dmitrij Kollars (GER)	2623	1 (B248)	1 (W194)	1 (B14)	½ (W16)	0 (B2)	0 (W67)	½ (B94)	1 (W160)	1 (B81)	6	47½
46	Francesco Sonis (ITA)	2576	1 (B296)	1 (W105)	½ (B3)	0 (W2)	1 (B125)	1 (W151)	0 (B36)	1 (W116)	½ (W34)	6	47½
46	Casper Schoppen (NED)	2529	1 (B150)	1 (W193)	½ (B27)	0 (W4)	1 (B144)	0 (W14)	1 (B151)	1 (W70)	½ (B46)	6	47½
46	Bibisara Assaubayeva (KAZ)	2494	1 (B149)	0 (W8)	½ (B142)	1 (W158)	1 (B126)	½ (W44)	1 (B83)	½ (W46)	½ (B27)	6	47½
51	Denis Kadric (MNE)	2533	1 (W179)	1 (B133)	½ (W30)	0 (B34)	1 (W197)	½ (B33)	1 (W88)	0 (B21)	1 (W96)	6	47
52	Leon Livaić (CRO)	2536	1 (B211)	1 (W225)	½ (B4)	0 (W27)	1 (B121)	½ (W59)	½ (B70)	½ (W85)	1 (B93)	6	45
53	Daniel Fridman (GER)	2582	1 (W273)	½ (B151)	½ (W99)	1 (B257)	1 (W119)	½ (B37)	½ (W80)	0 (W15)	1 (B90)	6	42½
54	Dennis Wagner (GER)	2607	1 (W202)	½ (B190)	0 (W82)	1 (B284)	0 (W151)	1 (B256)	½ (B90)	1 (W105)	1 (W107)	6	38½

Notes:

- Only players with a score of at least 6 points are listed.
- For tie-breaks, the Buchholz system was used.
- The first letter in the brackets denotes if the player had the white or the black pieces in that round. The number after that denotes the final rank of the opponent.
- If a player switched from the Grenke Chess Open to the Freestyle Open during the tournament, points carried over are denoted as "(open)".

Since Carlsen had already qualified to the Las Vegas tournament, it was initially announced that a tiebreaker would be played between the seven players who tied for second place to determine the qualifier. The following day it was confirmed that Maghsoodloo was awarded the qualification spot.

=== Tour standings after the tournament ===
	Pos.	Player	Points
	1	(Norway) Magnus Carlsen	65
1	2	(United States) Fabiano Caruana	39
1	3	(Germany) Vincent Keymer	37
	4	(United States) Hikaru Nakamura	28
8	5	(Iran) Parham Maghsoodloo	18

Note: Only the top five positions are included.

== See also ==
- Grenke Chess Festival
- Freestyle Chess Grand Slam Tour
- FIDE Freestyle Chess World Championship 2026
