= Freestyle Chess G.O.A.T. Challenge =

Fischer random chess tournament

Logo of the Freestyle Chess G.O.A.T. Challenge

The Freestyle Chess G.O.A.T. Challenge was an 8-player over-the-board classical Chess960 tournament that took place at Gut Weißenhaus in Wangels, Germany from February 9–16, 2024. It was the first major Chess960 tournament that used classical chess time controls.

The tournament was organized and sponsored by Jan Henric Buettner, owner of the Weißenhaus resort, and co-organized by five-time World Chess Champion Magnus Carlsen.

Carlsen reportedly handpicked the seven other competitors – Ding Liren, Fabiano Caruana, Alireza Firouzja, Gukesh D, Nodirbek Abdusattorov, Vincent Keymer and Levon Aronian. Chess960 World Champion Hikaru Nakamura was invited, but declined to participate, possibly in order to focus on the upcoming Candidates Tournament. Carlsen won the event.

In March 2024, Buettner and Carlsen announced that the tournament would expand into a yearly series of events with increased prize funds. The second edition of the event took place from February 7–14, 2025, as the first leg of the Freestyle Chess Grand Slam Tour.

== Format ==
The event started with a round-robin rapid tournament to determine the pairings for the main classical event. The time control for the round-robin is 25 minutes plus 10 seconds increment per move. It took place over the first two days of the tournament, February 9–10.

The main event is a single-elimination tournament.

- The time control is 90 minutes for the first 40 moves, followed by 30 minutes for the rest of the game, and a 30-second increment per move after move 40.
- The matches consist of two classical games. In the event of a tie, rapid and blitz tiebreaks are played in the following order until the tie is broken – two 15+10 rapid games, two 5+2 blitz games and if a tie persists, one armageddon game.

Before each round, the starting position for the round is drawn using 958 balls (the normal chess position, and the same position with queens and kings swapped, are excluded). The players get 10 minutes to discuss the position before the start of a round.

== Name ==
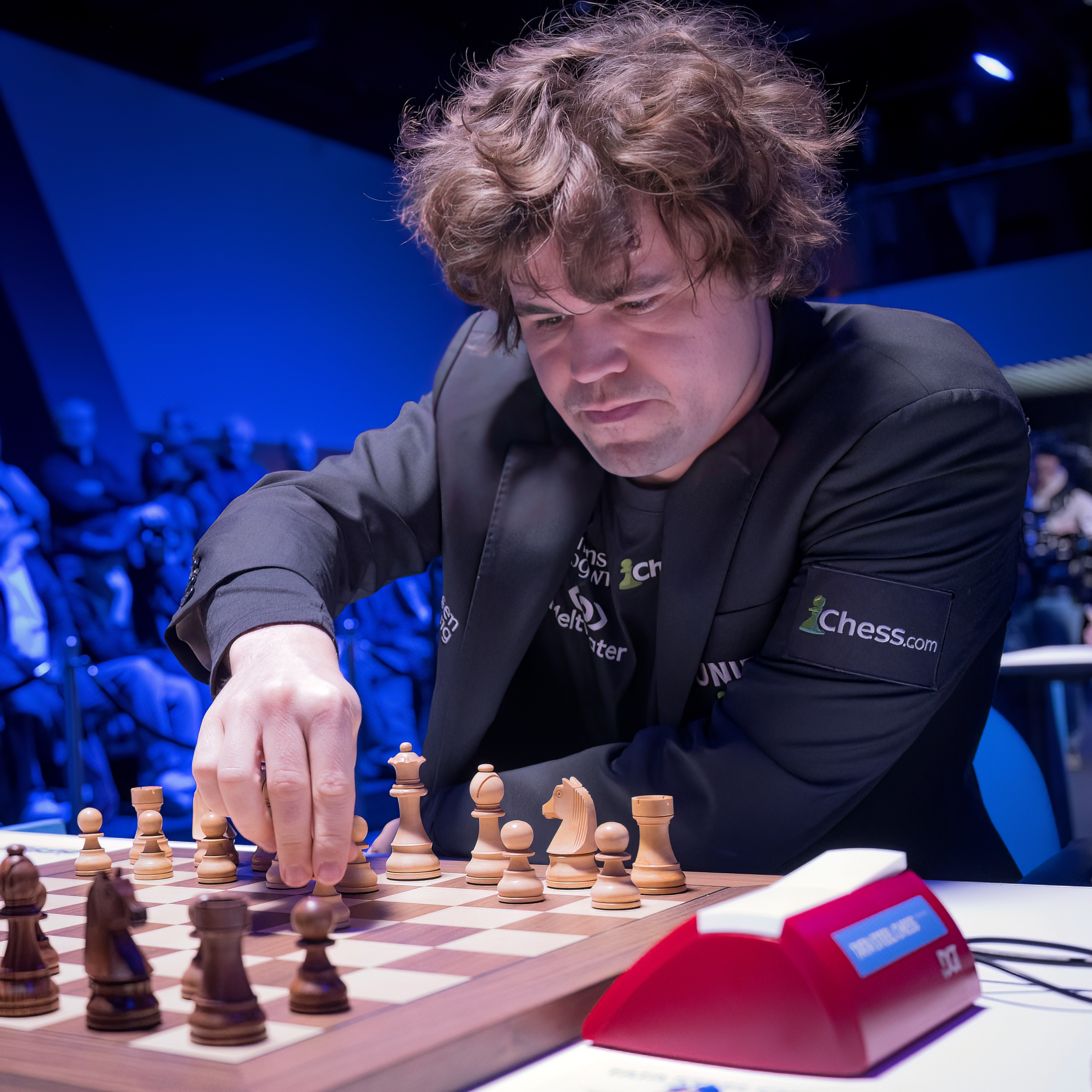
Magnus Carlsen co-organised the Freestyle Chess G.O.A.T. Challenge

Freestyle Chess is another name for Chess960, otherwise known as Fischer random chess, a variant of chess where there are 960 different possible starting positions. In previous Freestyle Chess tournaments, notably the World Chess960 Championships, largely rapid chess time controls had been used instead of classical chess, despite randomised starting positions requiring more time for thought due to the lack of opening theory. This led Magnus Carlsen to pitch his idea for a classical Freestyle Chess tournament.

Carlsen's status as arguably the greatest chess player of all time, or the "G.O.A.T.", and him handpicking his opponents or "challengers" inspired the name "Freestyle Chess G.O.A.T. Challenge".

== Prize fund ==
The total prize fund for the event was $200,000.

Place	Prize money
1	$60,000
2	$40,000
3	$30,000
4	$20,000
5	$15,000
6	$12,000
7	$10,000
8	$8,000

== Results ==
=== Rapid event ===
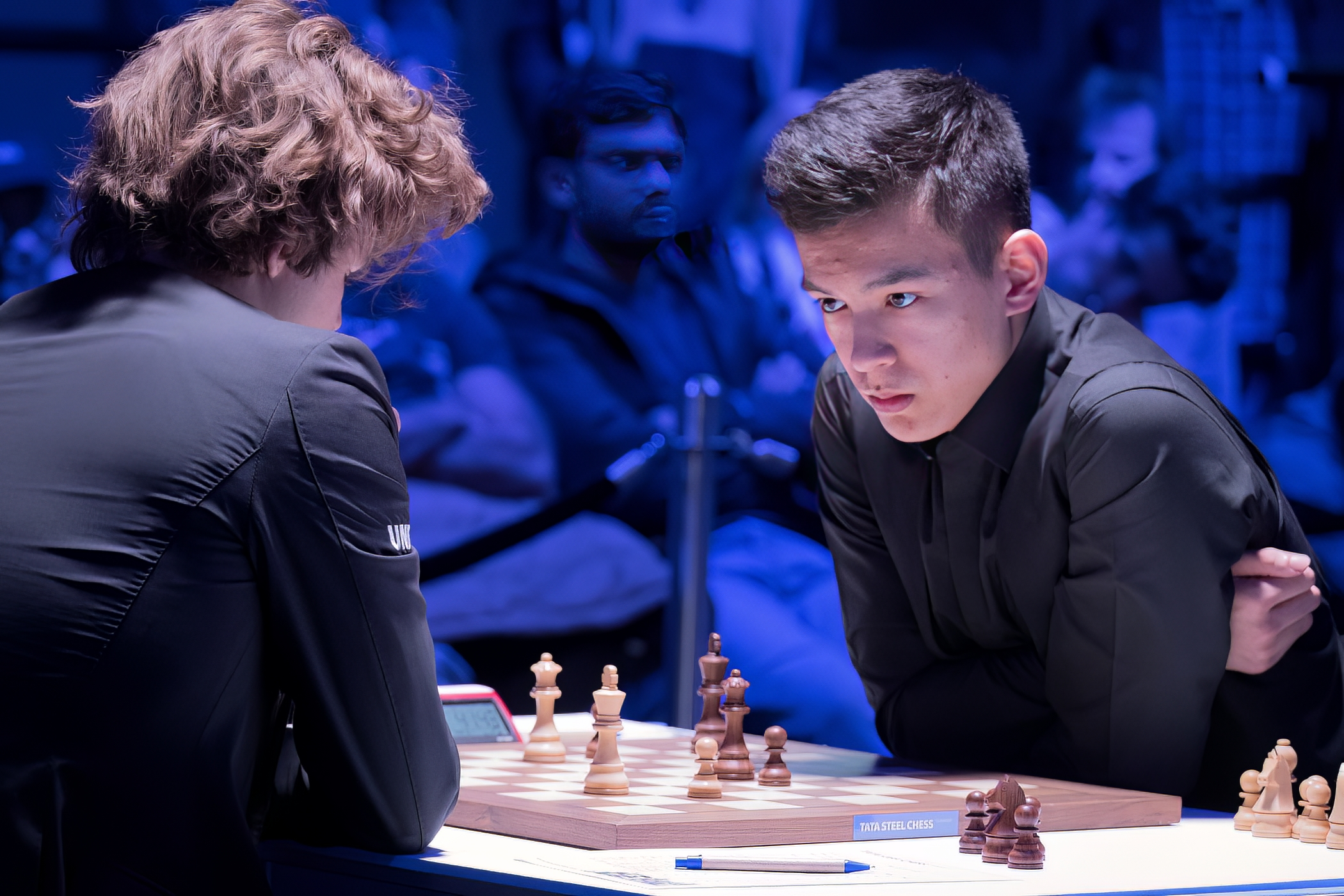
Nodirbek Abdusattorov went undefeated to win the rapid event, scoring 5.5 out of 7 points.

The first four rounds of the rapid round-robin event were played on day 1. World Chess Champion Ding Liren blundered a piece and lost against Fabiano Caruana in round 1, and went on to lose his next three games as well. Gukesh recovered from a round 1 loss to Alireza Firouzja to win his next three games, including a round 2 win over Magnus Carlsen and a round 4 win over Ding. The only undefeated players were Vincent Keymer and Nodirbek Abdusattorov, the former scoring 3.5/4 to emerge the sole leader.

Ding's loss streak continued on day 2 as he lost his round 5 encounter with Carlsen, the first meeting between the two world champions since Ding's title victory in 2023. Ding lost again in round 6 before finishing in last place with a total score of 0.5/7. Abdusattorov remained undefeated, beating Gukesh in round 6 and Carlsen in round 7 to win the rapid event with a score of 5.5/7, half a point ahead of Keymer.

Rapid Event, 9–10 February 2024
#	Player	Rating	1	2	3	4	5	6	7	8	Points
1	Nodirbek Abdusattorov (UZB)	2733		½	½	1	1	1	½	1	5½
2	Vincent Keymer (GER)	2627	½		1	0	½	1	1	1	5
3	Fabiano Caruana (USA)	2729	½	0		½	½	1	1	1	4½
4	Alireza Firouzja (FRA)	2724	0	1	½		½	1	½	½	4
5	Magnus Carlsen (NOR)	2823	0	½	½	½		0	1	1	3½
6	Gukesh D (IND)	2649	0	0	0	0	1		1	1	3
7	Levon Aronian (USA)	2746	½	0	0	½	0	0		1	2
8	Ding Liren (CHN)	2818	0	0	0	½	0	0	0		½

=== Main event ===
Quarterfinals
1	Nodirbek Abdusattorov (UZB)	1½
8	Ding Liren (CHN)	½
4	Alireza Firouzja (FRA)	1
5	Magnus Carlsen (NOR)	3
3	Fabiano Caruana (USA)	1½
6	Gukesh D (IND)	½
2	Vincent Keymer (GER)	½
7	Levon Aronian (USA)	1½

Semifinals
1	Nodirbek Abdusattorov (UZB)	½
5	Magnus Carlsen (NOR)	1½
3	Fabiano Caruana (USA)	4
7	Levon Aronian (USA)	3

Finals
5	Magnus Carlsen (NOR)	1½
3	Fabiano Caruana (USA)	½
Third place
1	Nodirbek Abdusattorov (UZB)	½
7	Levon Aronian (USA)	1½

==== 5th-8th Place ====
Semifinals
8	Ding Liren (CHN)	½
4	Alireza Firouzja (FRA)	1½
6	Gukesh D (IND)	2½
2	Vincent Keymer (GER)	1½

Fifth place
4	Alireza Firouzja (FRA)	1½
6	Gukesh D (IND)	½
Seventh place
8	Ding Liren (CHN)	0
2	Vincent Keymer (GER)	2

=== Freestyle Chess ratings ===
Freestyle Chess elo ratings for the players were revealed at the end of the event.

#	Player	Freestyle Rating	FIDE Rating
1	Magnus Carlsen (NOR)	2841.0	2830
2	Fabiano Caruana (USA)	2798.2	2804
3	Levon Aronian (USA)	2749.6	2725
4	Nodirbek Abdusattorov (UZB)	2738.4	2744
5	Alireza Firouzja (FRA)	2779.6	2760
6	Gukesh D (IND)	2729.4	2743
7	Vincent Keymer (GER)	2747.2	2738
8	Ding Liren (CHN)	2722.6	2762

== Future ==
Tournament co-organizer Jan Henric Buettner announced that Freestyle Chess will likely launch a tour in 2025. The top five players from the 2024 event qualified for the 2025 tour: the semifinalists Carlsen, Caruana, Aronian and Abdusattorov, as well as the winner of the 5th-8th place bracket, Firouzja. Fischer Random World Champion Hikaru Nakamura will also be invited again in 2025.

After the event, Buettner said he planned to organise a Grand Slam of five Freestyle Chess tournaments on five continents with a million dollar prize fund for each event. He also confirmed that the event would return in 2025 with higher prize money. On July 25, 2024, it was announced that the venture had raised $12 million in funding from Left Lane Capital.

In November 2024, Carlsen and Caruana played a two-game exhibition match in Singapore to promote the upcoming Freestyle Chess Grand Slam Tour, which will comprise five "Grand Slam" tournaments starting in February 2025. Carlsen won the match by the score of 1.5-0.5.
