= FIDE Freestyle Chess World Championship 2026 =

Chess960 world championship

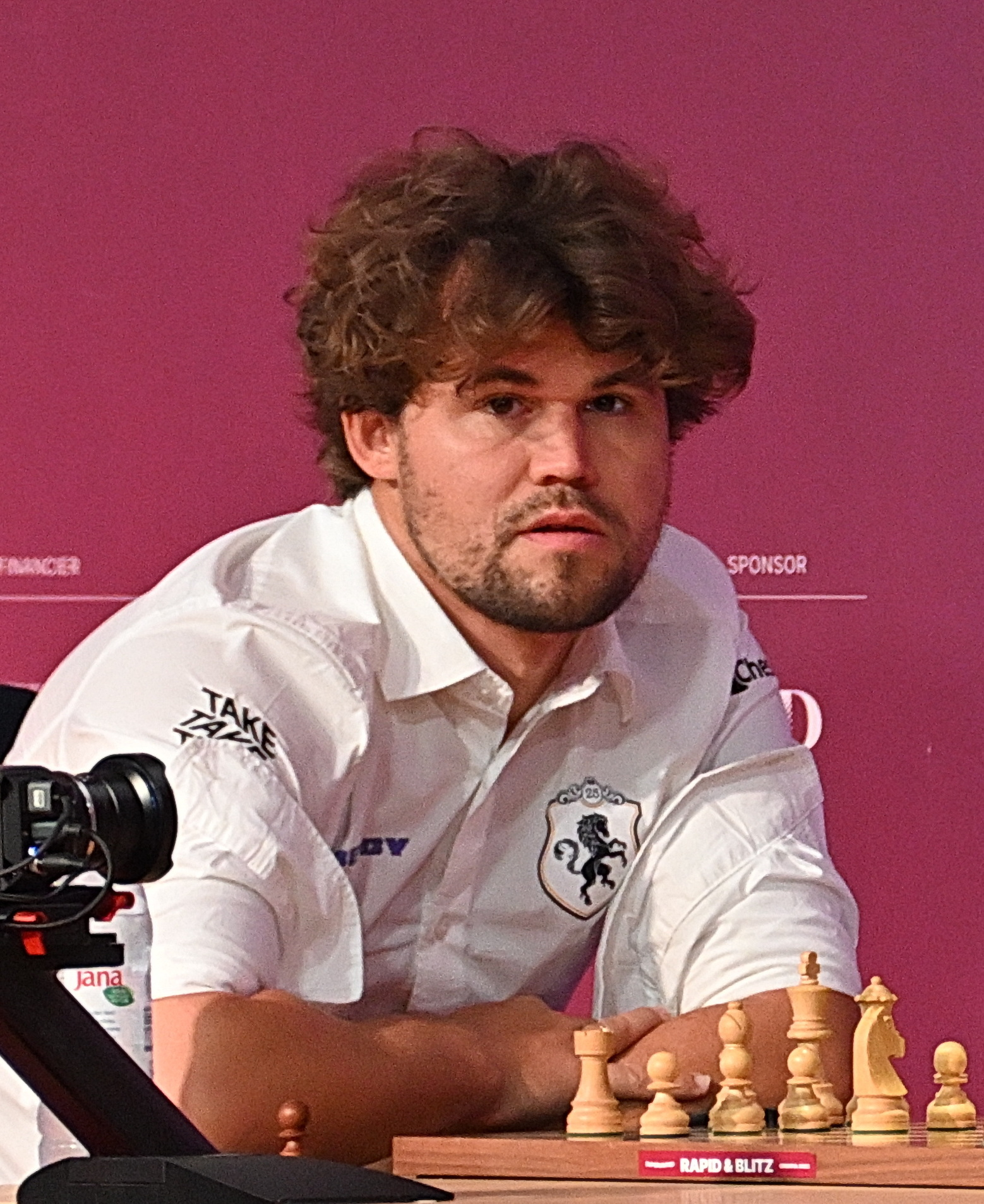
- Magnus Carlsen, the winner of the Freestyle Chess Championship 2026.
- Venue: Schloss Weissenhaus
- Location: Wangels, Germany
- Dates: 13–15 February 2026
- Organizing body: Freestyle Chess Operations
- Website: www.freestyle-chess.com

Champion
- (Norway) Magnus Carlsen

The FIDE Freestyle Chess World Championship 2026 was the third official World Chess960 Championship, organized by FIDE and Freestyle Chess Operations. The competition had followed a format similar to the previous editions held in 2019 and 2022; an online play-in open to all titled players determined one player to join seven invited players in the over-the-board final, which took place at the Schloss Weissenhaus resort in Wangels, Germany from 13 to 15 February 2026.

Magnus Carlsen won the championship after defeating Fabiano Caruana in the final, securing his maiden Chess960 title and the twenty-first world title of his career.

The incumbent Chess960 champion, Hikaru Nakamura, had declined the invitation to defend his title.

== Players ==
The qualifiers for the World Championship were:

Qualification method	Player	Age	Rating	World ranking
Qualification method	Player	(February 2026)		
Top 6 finishers of the Freestyle Chess Grand Slam Tour	(Norway) Magnus Carlsen	35	2840	1
Top 6 finishers of the Freestyle Chess Grand Slam Tour	(United States) Levon Aronian	43	2729	18
Top 6 finishers of the Freestyle Chess Grand Slam Tour	(United States) Fabiano Caruana	33	2795	3
Top 6 finishers of the Freestyle Chess Grand Slam Tour	(Germany) Vincent Keymer	21	2776	4
Top 6 finishers of the Freestyle Chess Grand Slam Tour	(Uzbekistan) Javokhir Sindarov	20	2726	20
Top 6 finishers of the Freestyle Chess Grand Slam Tour	(India) Arjun Erigaisi	22	2775	5
Wildcard nominated by Freestyle Chess	(United States) Hans Niemann	22	2725	21
Winner of the online play-in	(Uzbekistan) Nodirbek Abdusattorov	21	2751	12

=== Nakamura declines his invitation ===
Hikaru Nakamura, the 2022 Fischer Random World Champion, declined his invitation to the event, citing the changes in the format, rushed arrangement, reduced prize fund, and his focus on the upcoming Candidates Tournament 2026. He said he had been invited to the first leg of the 2026 Freestyle Tour, with the same format and prize fund as the 2025 tour; however, a few days before the announcement of the world championship, he was informed there would be no year-long tour. Instead, only a three-day event with rapid time controls would be held, and it would be called a World Championship. He called it a "hastily arranged tournament with less than 1/3rd the prize fund it originally had", and lamented that the classical length format from the first event in 2025 wasn't continued.

== Organization ==
Eight players faced each other in the group stage. The format was a single round-robin tournament, meaning seven rounds. The format for matches in the knockout stage was a best-of-four series, except for the finals of fifth and seventh place that were best-of-two series.

=== Regulations ===
The time control for the Group stage was 10 minutes per player and an increment of 5 seconds per move starting from move 1 and in the Knockout stage was 25 minutes per player with an increment of 10 seconds per move starting from move 1.

In the event of a tie for qualification out of group stage, tie breaks would have been applied in the following order:

1. Game Points
2. If two players tied for first or fifth place, an Armageddon would be played where the players bid a maximum time of 5 mins and the lower bid gets to play with black pieces and draw odds while being able to seek advice from the second for 5 minutes before the game started. If more than two players tied, then a Round robin mini-tournament would be played with 5 minutes per player and an increment of 3 seconds per move starting from move 1.
3. In the event of a tie for fourth place between two and four players, a double round robin mini-tournament would be played with a time control of 5 minutes and an increment of 3 seconds per move starting from move 1. If more than four players are tied, a single round-robin mini-tournament would be played with the same time control.

In the knockout stage, Armageddon would be used as the tie-breaker, with maximum bid time of 10 mins.

For the semifinal matches, the player ranked first in the Group Stage had chosen an opponent from among the players ranked third and fourth, and the player ranked second had to play against the remaining player. Similarly, for the Lower Bracket semifinals, the player ranked fifth in the Group Stage had chosen an opponent from among the players ranked seventh and eighth, and the player ranked sixth had to play against the remaining player. The player who ranked higher in the Group Stage in each matchup had the right to choose their color for the first game of the semifinals. In the subsequent round, the player who ranked higher in the Group Stage in a matchup received the alternate color of the one they started with in the previous round.

=== Prize money ===
The total prize pool for the tournament was $300,000, which was distributed as follows:

Finish	Prize ($USD)
1st	$100,000
2nd	$60,000
3rd	$40,000
4th	$30,000
5th	$25,000
6th	$20,000
7th	$15,000
8th	$10,000

=== Schedule ===
Date	Day	Event
11 February 2026	Wednesday	Arrivals
12 February 2026	Thursday	Media day
13 February 2026	Friday	Group Stage
14 February 2026	Saturday	Semifinals
15 February 2026	Sunday	Finals
16 February 2026	Monday	Departures

== Play-in ==
All FIDE-titled players can participate in the Play-in. On day 1, players compete in a nine-round Swiss tournament with a 10+2 time control, and the top-four finishers advance to the knockout stage. On day 2, the knockout will be a single-elimination competition, with each match consisting of two games played at a 15+3 time control. If the match is tied 1-1 at the completion of both games a bidding Armageddon game will be played with a base time of 10 minutes. The bid winner receives the black pieces.

4 players who advanced for the knockout stage are listed below.

Rank (in event)	Player	Score	Rating	World ranking
Rank (in event)	Player	Score	(January 2026)	
1	(Uzbekistan) Nodirbek Abdusattorov	7	2751	12
2	(India) Pranav Venkatesh	7	2641	82
3	(United States) Grigoriy Oparin	7	2658	57
4	(Iran) Amin Tabatabaei	7	2700	33

=== Knockout Bracket ===
Semifinals (January 15)
(Uzbekistan) Nodirbek Abdusattorov	1½
(Iran) Amin Tabatabaei	½
(United States) Grigoriy Oparin	½
(India) Pranav V	1½

Final (January 15)
(Uzbekistan) Nodirbek Abdusattorov	2
(India) Pranav V	0
Third place
(Iran) Amin Tabatabaei (Note: Tabatabaei won the third place match as black in the Armageddon game.)	1½
(United States) Grigoriy Oparin	1½

== Results ==
=== Group Stage ===
Rapid round-robin, 13 February 2026
	Player	Rapid rating (Feb 2026)	1	2	3	4	5	6	7	8	Points
1	Magnus Carlsen (NOR)	2832		½	1	½	½	0	1	1	4½
2	Vincent Keymer (GER)	2627	½		1	½	1	0	0	1	4
3	Fabiano Caruana (USA)	2727	0	0		1	1	1	½	½	4
4	Nodirbek Abdusattorov (UZB)	2703	½	½	0		0	1	1	1	4
5	Hans Niemann (USA)	2646	½	0	0	1		1	½	½	3½
6	Arjun Erigaisi (IND)	2741	1	1	0	0	0		1	0	3
7	Javokhir Sindarov (UZB)	2727	0	1	½	0	½	0		1	3
8	Levon Aronian (USA)	2731	0	0	½	0	½	1	0		2

=== Results by round ===
Round 1
Arjun Erigaisi	1–0	Vincent Keymer
Nodirbek Abdusattorov	0–1	Fabiano Caruana
Hans Niemann	½–½	Magnus Carlsen
Javokhir Sindarov	1–0	Levon Aronian
Starting position – 075

Round 2
Vincent Keymer	1–0	Levon Aronian
Magnus Carlsen	1–0	Javokhir Sindarov
Fabiano Caruana	1–0	Hans Niemann
Arjun Erigaisi	0–1	Nodirbek Abdusattorov
Starting position – 349

Round 3
Nodirbek Abdusattorov	½–½	Vincent Keymer
Hans Niemann	1–0	Arjun Erigaisi
Javokhir Sindarov	½–½	Fabiano Caruana
Levon Aronian	0–1	Magnus Carlsen
Starting position – 483

Round 4
Vincent Keymer	½–½	Magnus Carlsen
Fabiano Caruana	½–½	Levon Aronian
Arjun Erigaisi	1–0	Javokhir Sindarov
Nodirbek Abdusattorov	0–1	Hans Niemann
Starting position – 770

Round 5
Hans Niemann	0–1	Vincent Keymer
Javokhir Sindarov	0–1	Nodirbek Abdusattorov
Levon Aronian	1–0	Arjun Erigaisi
Magnus Carlsen	1–0	Fabiano Caruana
Starting position – 187

Round 6
Vincent Keymer	1–0	Fabiano Caruana
Arjun Erigaisi	1–0	Magnus Carlsen
Nodirbek Abdusattorov	1–0	Levon Aronian
Hans Niemann	½–½	Javokhir Sindarov
Starting position – 255

Round 7
Javokhir Sindarov	1–0	Vincent Keymer
Levon Aronian	½–½	Hans Niemann
Magnus Carlsen	½–½	Nodirbek Abdusattorov
Fabiano Caruana	1–0	Arjun Erigaisi
Starting position – 277

=== Semifinals ===
==== Upper Bracket ====
Player	1	2	3	4	TB	Total
Player	Rapid				Armageddon	Total
(Uzbekistan) Nodirbek Abdusattorov	½	½	0	0	Not required	1
(Norway) Magnus Carlsen	½	½	1	1	Not required	3
(Germany) Vincent Keymer	0	½	1	0	Not required	1½
(United States) Fabiano Caruana	1	½	0	1	Not required	2½
Starting position	858	184	133	545		

==== Lower Bracket ====
Player	1	2	3	4	TB	Total
Player	Rapid				Armageddon	Total
(United States) Hans Niemann	1	0	1	½	Not required	2½
(United States) Levon Aronian	0	1	0	½	Not required	1½
(India) Arjun Erigaisi	½	½	1	1	Not required	3
(Uzbekistan) Javokhir Sindarov	½	½	0	0	Not required	1
Starting position	858	184	133	545		

=== Final ===
==== First and third place matches ====
Place	Player	1	2	3	4	TB	Total
Place	Player	Rapid				Armageddon	Total
First	(Norway) Magnus Carlsen	½	½	1	½	Not required	2½
First	(United States) Fabiano Caruana	½	½	0	½	Not required	1½
Third	(Uzbekistan) Nodirbek Abdusattorov	½	1	½	½	Not required	2½
Third	(Germany) Vincent Keymer	½	0	½	½	Not required	1½
Starting position		506	195	889	828		

==== Fifth, and seventh place matches ====
Place	Player	1	2	TB	Total
Place	Player	Rapid		Armageddon	Total
Fifth	(India) Arjun Erigaisi	0	0	Not required	0
Fifth	(United States) Hans Niemann	1	1	Not required	2
Seventh	(Uzbekistan) Javokhir Sindarov	0	1	Loss	1
Seventh	(United States) Levon Aronian	1	0	Win	2
Starting position		506	195	889	
