= Weissenhaus Freestyle Chess Grand Slam =

First leg of the Freestyle Chess Grand Slam Tour

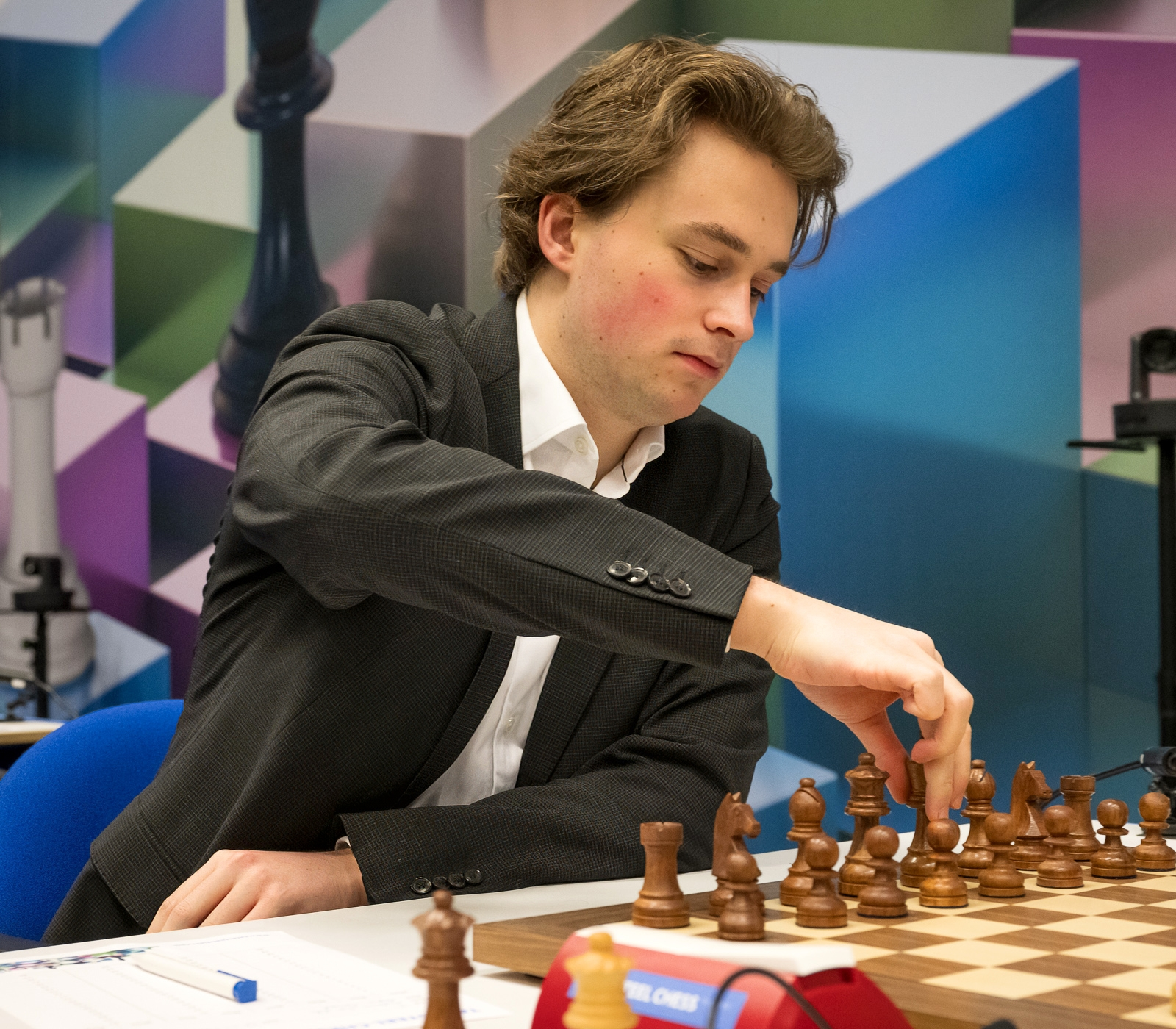
- Vincent Keymer, the winner of the Weissenhaus Freestyle Chess Grand Slam.

Tournament information
- Sport: Chess variant (Chess960)
- Location: Wangels, Germany
- Dates: 7 February 2025–14 February 2025
- Tournament format(s): Single-elimination tournament with round-robin seeding round
- Host(s): Freestyle Chess Operations
- Venue: Gut Weißenhaus
- Participants: 10

Final positions
- Champion: (Germany) Vincent Keymer
- Runner-up: (United States) Fabiano Caruana
- 3rd place: (Norway) Magnus Carlsen

The Weissenhaus Freestyle Chess Grand Slam was a 10-player Chess960 tournament that took place in Wangels, Germany from 7 February to 14 February 2025. It was the first leg of the Freestyle Chess Grand Slam Tour, a series of Chess960 tournaments being held throughout 2025.

== Background ==
After the Freestyle Chess G.O.A.T. Challenge took place as a stand-alone tournament at the Weißenhaus resort in 2024, the event was renamed for 2025 and became part of the Freestyle Chess Grand Slam Tour in 2025 as its first leg. The format remained similar to 2024 with the number of participants being increased to 10.

== Qualification ==
All qualification matches were played online and were hosted by Chess.com.

=== Open qualifiers ===
All non-titled players started qualification in one of two separate open qualifier events, which were held on January 4 and January 5 respectively. 196 players participated, with the top three players from each event advancing to the Swiss stage.

=== Swiss stage ===
248 players participated in the Swiss stage held on January 6. It was open to all titled players. The top four players, Vladimir Fedoseev, Denis Lazavik, Javokhir Sindarov and Olexandr Bortnyk advanced to the 16-player knockout stage.

=== Knockout stage ===
Twelve players of the Freestyle Chess Players Club were invited directly to the knockout stage, held on January 7 and 8. They were sorted by their December 2024 classical FIDE rankings and seeded accordingly from 1-12.

Vladimir Fedoseev beat Javokhir Sindarov in the final in an armageddon game, after a 2–2 tie, and qualified for the Grand Slam. Following Viswanathan Anand's withdrawal, Sindarov also qualified.

Round of 16 (Jan 7)
S3	Javokhir Sindarov (UZB)	1½
2	Wei Yi (CHN)	½
10	Vidit Gujrathi (IND)	1
7	R Praggnanandhaa (IND)	3
S2	Denis Lazavik (FIDE)	3
3	Wesley So (USA)	2
11	Yu Yangyi (CHN)	1½
6	Lê Quang Liêm (VIE)	½
S1	Vladimir Fedoseev (SLO)	2
4	Leinier Domínguez (USA)	0
12	Parham Maghsoodloo (IRN)	1
5	Jan-Krzysztof Duda (POL)	3
9	Maxime Vachier-Lagrave (FRA)	½
8	Hans Niemann (USA)	1½
S4	Oleksandr Bortnyk (UKR)	½
1	Ian Nepomniachtchi (FIDE)	1½

Quarterfinals (Jan 7)
S3	Javokhir Sindarov (UZB)	2
7	R Praggnanandhaa (IND)	0
S2	Denis Lazavik (FIDE)	0
11	Yu Yangyi (CHN)	2
S1	Vladimir Fedoseev (SLO)	2
5	Jan-Krzysztof Duda (POL)	0
8	Hans Niemann (USA)	1½
1	Ian Nepomniachtchi (FIDE)	2½

Semifinals (Jan 8)
S3	Javokhir Sindarov (UZB)	1½
11	Yu Yangyi (CHN)	½
S1	Vladimir Fedoseev (SLO)	2½
1	Ian Nepomniachtchi (FIDE)	1½

Final (Jan 8)
S3	Javokhir Sindarov (UZB)	2
S1	Vladimir Fedoseev (SLO)	3

Note: The player listed first played as white in the first game of the match. Scores between two players adding up to 2 indicate a win under rapid time controls; adding up to 4, a win under blitz time controls; and adding up to 5, a win in armageddon with bidding.

== Main event ==
=== Participants ===
The qualifiers to the first leg were as follows:

Qualification method	Player	Age	Rating	World ranking	Freestyle Rating
Qualification method	Player	(February 2025)			
The top three finishers in the Freestyle Chess G.O.A.T. Challenge	(Norway) Magnus Carlsen (winner)	34	2833	1	2841.0
The top three finishers in the Freestyle Chess G.O.A.T. Challenge	(United States) Fabiano Caruana (runner-up)	32	2803	2	2798.2
The top three finishers in the Freestyle Chess G.O.A.T. Challenge	(United States) Levon Aronian (third place)	42	2745	12	2749.6
The three highest rated players in the April 2024 FIDE rankings	(United States) Hikaru Nakamura	37	2802	3	NA
The three highest rated players in the April 2024 FIDE rankings	(Uzbekistan) Nodirbek Abdusattorov	20	2766	6	2738.4
The three highest rated players in the April 2024 FIDE rankings	(France) Alireza Firouzja	21	2760	7	2779.6
International wild card (Note: From Freestyle Chess Players Club (FCPC) members)	(India) ~~Viswanathan Anand~~ (withdrew)	55	2750	10	NA
Local wild card	(Germany) Vincent Keymer	20	2731	19	2747.2
Winner of the World Chess Championship 2024	(India) Gukesh Dommaraju	18	2777	5	2729.4
Winner of the online play-in	(Slovenia) Vladimir Fedoseev (winner)	29	2724	24	NA
Winner of the online play-in	(Uzbekistan) Javokhir Sindarov (runner-up, replacement for Anand)	19	2700	31	NA

=== Round-robin stage ===
The event began with a rapid round-robin stage, with a time control of 10 minutes with an increment of 10 seconds per move. The players finishing 1-8 in the round robin stage qualified for the classical knockout stage.

On the first day of the tournament, Javokhir Sindarov remained undefeated, winning four out of his five games, including a victory against Magnus Carlsen. By the end of the day, he was tied with Fabiano Caruana after their fifth-round game resulted in a draw.

On the second day, Alireza Firouzja defeated Sindarov in the final round, securing first place in the round-robin on tiebreaks and earning the right to be the first to select his opponent for the quarterfinals. Levon Aronian and Vladimir Fedoseev were eliminated from the main competition and were set to compete against each other in a match for ninth place.

Rapid round-robin, 7–8 February 2025
#	Player	1	2	3	4	5	6	7	8	9	10	Points
1	Alireza Firouzja (FRA)	*	1	0	½	½	1	½	1	1	1	6½
2	Javokhir Sindarov (UZB)	0	*	½	1	½	1	1	½	1	1	6½
3	Fabiano Caruana (USA)	1	½	*	1	0	½	½	½	1	1	6
4	Magnus Carlsen (NOR)	½	0	0	*	1	1	1	1	0	1	5½
5	Hikaru Nakamura (USA)	½	½	1	0	*	1	½	½	1	½	5½
6	Vincent Keymer (GER)	0	0	½	0	0	*	1	½	1	1	4
7	Nodirbek Abdusattorov (UZB)	½	0	½	0	½	0	*	½	1	½	3½
8	Gukesh Dommaraju (IND)	0	½	½	0	½	½	½	*	½	½	3½
9	Vladimir Fedoseev (SLO)	0	0	0	1	0	0	0	½	*	1	2½
10	Levon Aronian (USA)	0	0	0	0	½	0	½	½	0	*	1½

=== Knockout stage ===
Matches in the knockout stage consisted of two games using a time control of 90 minutes with an increment of 30 seconds per move. In the event of a tie, the tiebreak is two 10+10 rapid games followed by two 5+2 blitz games if the tie persists, and then one armageddon game with bidding. The players who finished 1st-4th in the rapid round robin stage picked their opponents from the players who finished 5th-8th. They also chose whether they would play as white or black in the first game.

Quarterfinals (Feb 9-10)
1	Alireza Firouzja (FRA)	½
6	Vincent Keymer (GER)	1½
4	Magnus Carlsen (NOR)	2
7	Nodirbek Abdusattorov (UZB)	0
8	Gukesh Dommaraju (IND)	0
3	Fabiano Caruana (USA)	2
2	Javokhir Sindarov (UZB)	2½
5	Hikaru Nakamura (USA)	1½

Semifinals (Feb 11-12)
6	Vincent Keymer (GER)	1½
4	Magnus Carlsen (NOR)	½
3	Fabiano Caruana (USA)	4
2	Javokhir Sindarov (UZB)	3

Final (Feb 13-14)
6	Vincent Keymer (GER)	1½
3	Fabiano Caruana (USA)	½
Third Place Match (Feb 13-14)
2	Javokhir Sindarov (UZB)	0
4	Magnus Carlsen (NOR)	2

==== 5th-8th Place ====
The four losers from the quarterfinal round above competed in the 5th-to-8th-place bracket.

(Feb 11-12)
7	Nodirbek Abdusattorov (UZB)	1½
1	Alireza Firouzja (FRA)	½
5	Hikaru Nakamura (USA)	2½
8	Gukesh Dommaraju (IND)	1½

Fifth Place Match (Feb 13-14)
7	Nodirbek Abdusattorov (UZB)	0
5	Hikaru Nakamura (USA)	2
Seventh Place Match (Feb 13-14)
1	Alireza Firouzja (FRA)	1½
8	Gukesh Dommaraju (IND)	½

==== 9th-10th Place ====
Ninth Place Match (Feb 9-10)
10	Levon Aronian (USA)	1½
9	Vladimir Fedoseev (SLO)	½

Note: The player listed first played as white in the first game of the match. Scores between two players adding up to 2 indicate a win under normal time controls; adding up to 4, a win under rapid time controls; adding up to 6, a win under blitz time controls; and adding up to 7, a win in armageddon with bidding.

=== Final classification ===
Pos.	Player	Prize money	Points
1	Vincent Keymer (GER)	$200,000	25
2	Fabiano Caruana (USA)	$140,000	18
3	Magnus Carlsen (NOR)	$100,000	15
4	Javokhir Sindarov (UZB)	$60,000	12
5	Hikaru Nakamura (USA)	$50,000	10
6	Nodirbek Abdusattorov (UZB)	$40,000	8
7	Alireza Firouzja (FRA)	$30,000	6
8	Gukesh Dommaraju (IND)	$20,000	4
9	Levon Aronian (USA)	$12,500	2
10	Vladimir Fedoseev (SLO)	$7,500	1

== Tour standings after the Grand Slam ==
Pos.	Player	Points
1	(Germany) Vincent Keymer	25
2	(United States) Fabiano Caruana	18
3	(Norway) Magnus Carlsen	15
4	(Uzbekistan) Javokhir Sindarov	12
5	(United States) Hikaru Nakamura	10

Note: Only the top five positions are included.
