= Jan Henric Buettner =

German entrepreneur (born 1964)

- Born: September 10, 1964 (age 62); Hamburg, Germany
- Occupation: Entrepreneur
- Spouse: Holly Chelsea Marie Buettner

Jan Henric Buettner (born 10 September 1964) is a German entrepreneur.

== Biography ==
Born in Hamburg, Buettner studied business management there and did an internship at a precursor of Vodafone, then started his career as a trainee at Axel Springer AG, where he worked on interactive media. In 1995 he developed AOL Europe with Andreas von Blottnitz. He became head of AOL Germany, then in 1997 moved to the US, where he established a venture capital firm specialising in internet companies, BV Capital, as general partner for Bertelsmann. In 2003 he and Blottnitz were awarded €203 million in damages by a California court for Bertelsmann's failure to pay them part of the proceeds from the sale of its share in AOL Europe; the amount was reduced to €160 million in an out-of-court agreement.

In 2005 he bought a historic estate by the Baltic Sea for €7 million, and converted the estate buildings and village into Grand Village Weissenhaus, a privately operated luxury resort which opened in 2014. Some of the funding for the renovation and conversion was raised on the crowdfunding site Companisto.de, where it drew more investment than any other for-profit European organisation to that date. In 2024, Buettner organized a high profile chess tournament at his resort, the Freestyle Chess G.O.A.T. Challenge. Buettner and five time world chess champion Magnus Carlsen announced in March 2024 that the tournament would expand into a yearly series of events with increased prize funds. In 2026, Buettner ran as a candidate for FIDE President in the FIDE elections with International Master Malcom Pein as his Deputy. Buettner obtained 20 votes out of 192 delegates at the FIDE Congress and was eliminated from the race.

Buettner lives in Hamburg. He is married to Holly Chelsea Marie Buettner. His former wife and their children continue to live in Santa Barbara, California.
