= Gut Weißenhaus =

Castle in Wangels, Schleswig-Holstein, Germany

Coordinates: 54.3025°N 10.7660°E

Schloss Weissenhaus
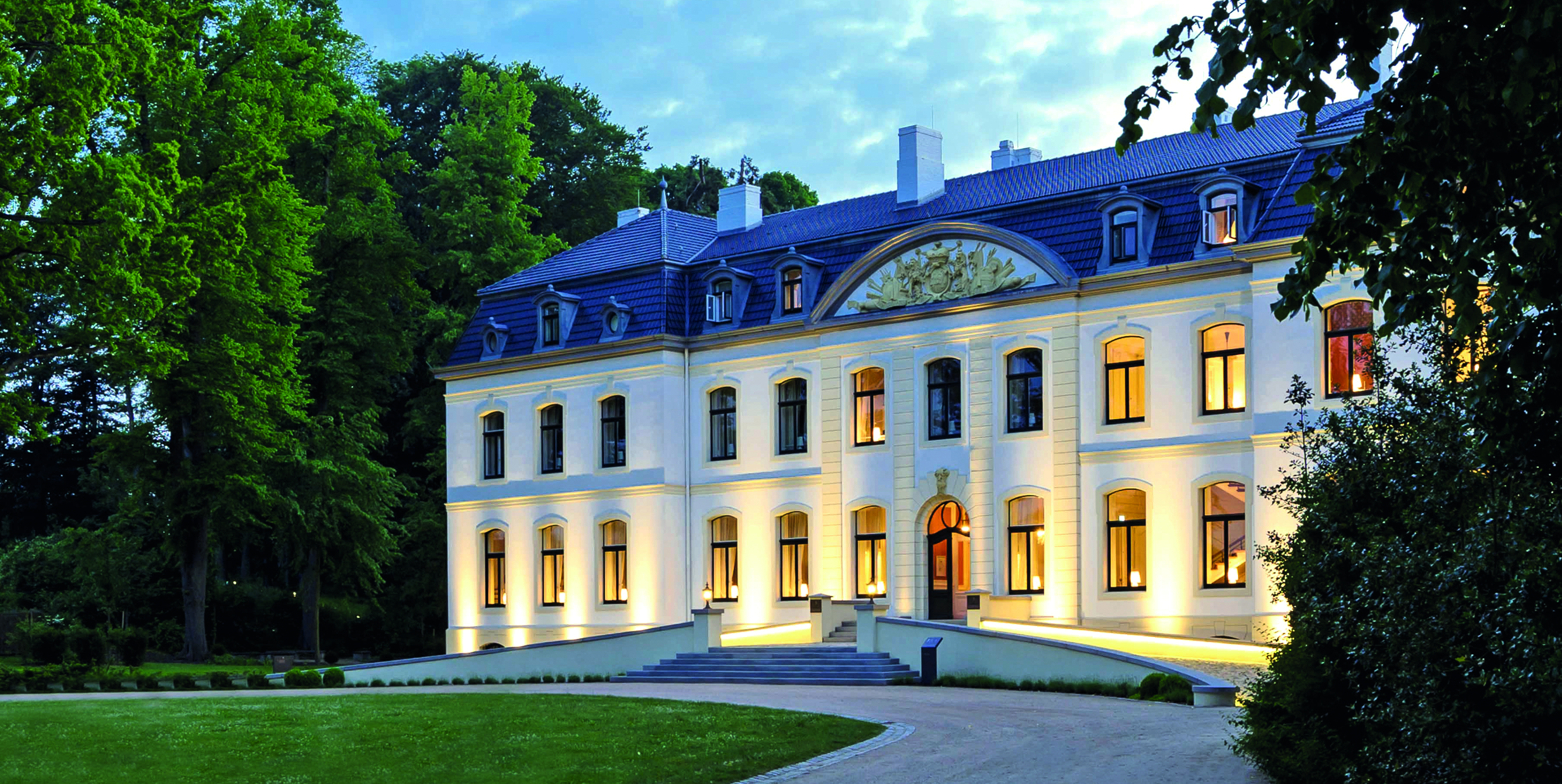
- Main building

General information
- Location: Wangels, Schleswig-Holstein, Germany, Germany
- Renovated: 2014
- Client: Jan Henric Buettner
- Owner: Jan Henric Buettner

Technical details
- Floor area: 75 hectares

Design and construction
- Known for: Private Nature Luxury Resort

Website
- Weissenhaus official website

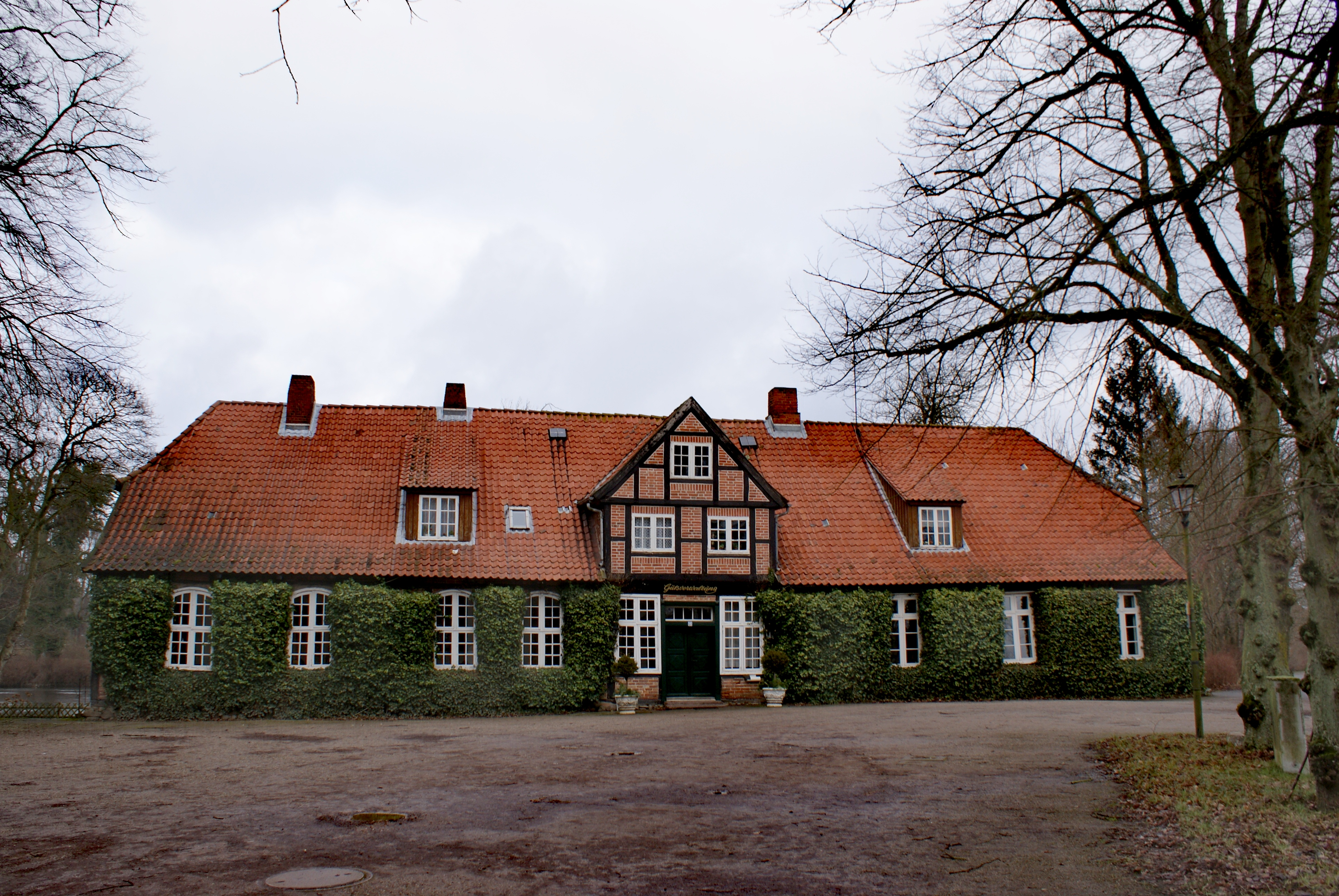
Cavalier house

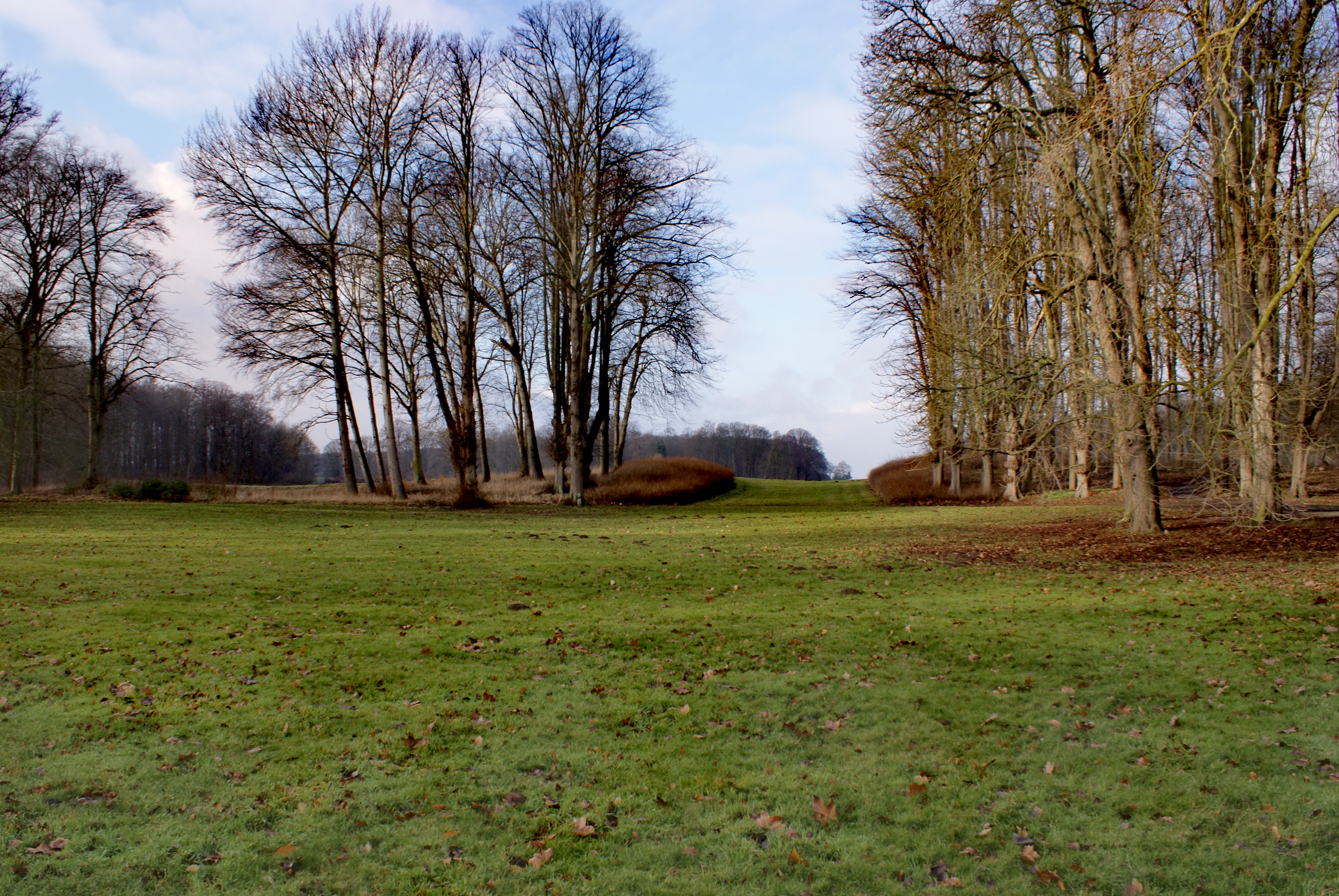
Park

Schloss Weissenhaus (also Gut Weißenhaus) is a schloss in Wangels in Schleswig-Holstein, Germany. It is next to the Baltic Sea and about 100 km away from Hamburg.

The 75 hectare estate, including several restored historic buildings and a village, is owned by Jan Henric Buettner, who bought it for €7 million in 2005 and opened a luxury resort there in 2014. €7.5 million in the funding for the renovation and conversion was raised on the crowdfunding site Companisto, where it drew more investment than any other for-profit European organisation to that date.

The resort's luxury restaurant Courier was awarded a Michelin star in the 2015 Guide and 16 Gault Millau points. In May 2022, the meeting of the G7 foreign ministers took place at Weissenhaus. In 2024, Buettner organized a high profile chess tournament at the resort, the Freestyle Chess G.O.A.T. Challenge.
