= Wangels =

- Municipality
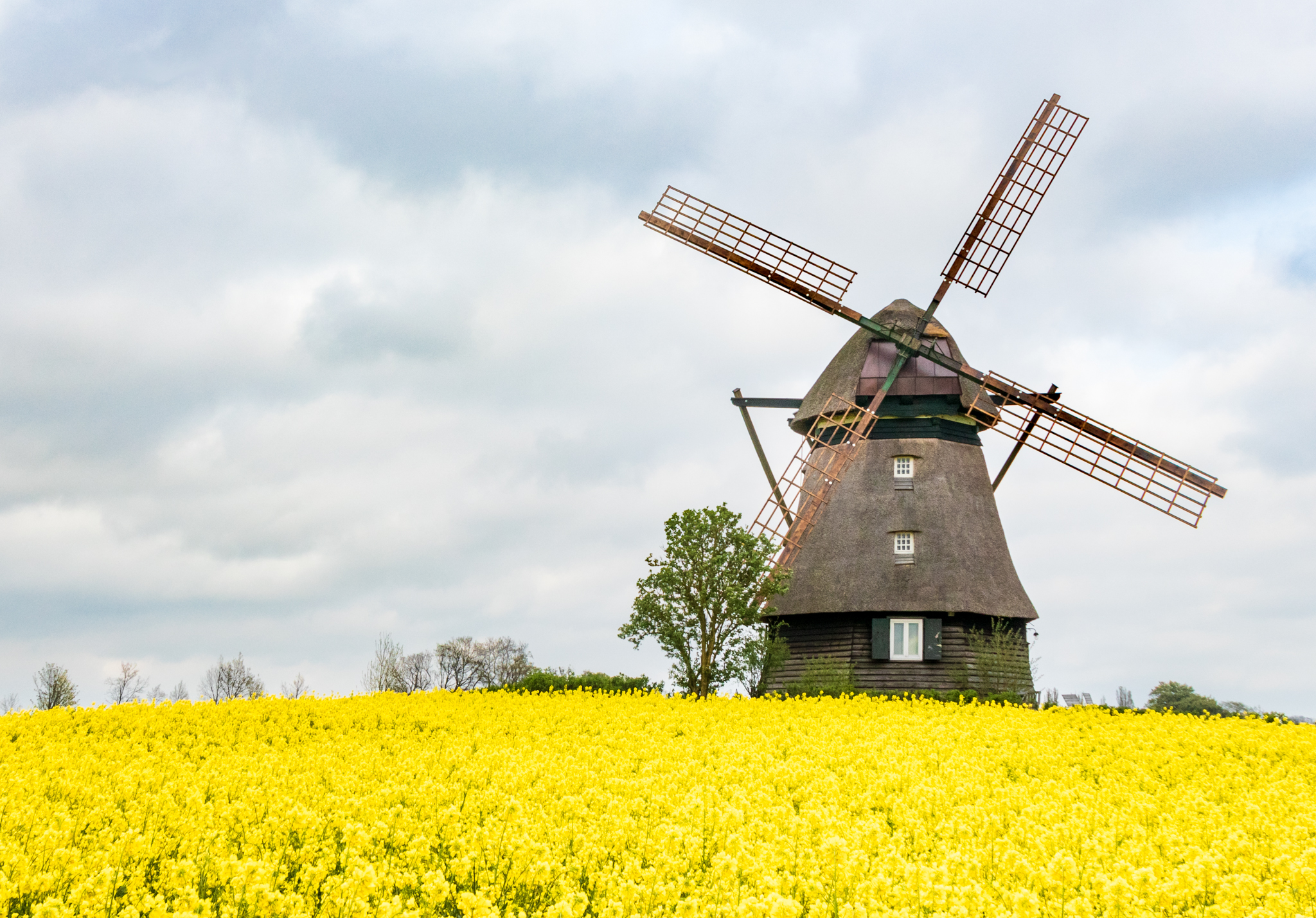
- The Farver Mühle, a windmill in Wangels

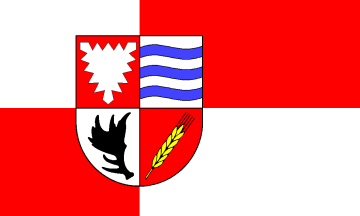
- Flag Coat of arms

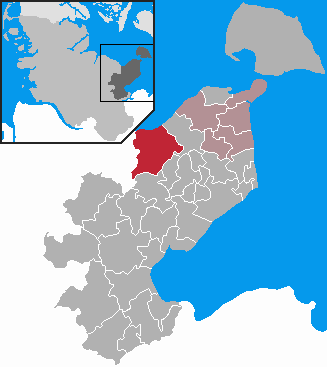
- Location of Wangels within Ostholstein district
- Interactive map of Wangels
- Location within Germany Location within Schleswig-Holstein
- Coordinates: 54°16′N 10°46′E
- Country: Germany
- State: Schleswig-Holstein
- District: Ostholstein
- Municipal assoc.: Oldenburg-Land

Government
  - Mayor: Christin Voß

Area
  - Total: 67.12 km^{2} (25.92 sq mi)
- Elevation: 56 m (184 ft)

Population (2025-12-31)
  - Total: 2,212
  - Density: 32.96/km^{2} (85.36/sq mi)
- Time zone: UTC+01:00 (CET)
  - Summer (DST): UTC+02:00 (CEST)
- Postal codes: 23758
- Dialling codes: 04382
- Vehicle registration: OH
- Website: www.amt-oldenburg- land.de

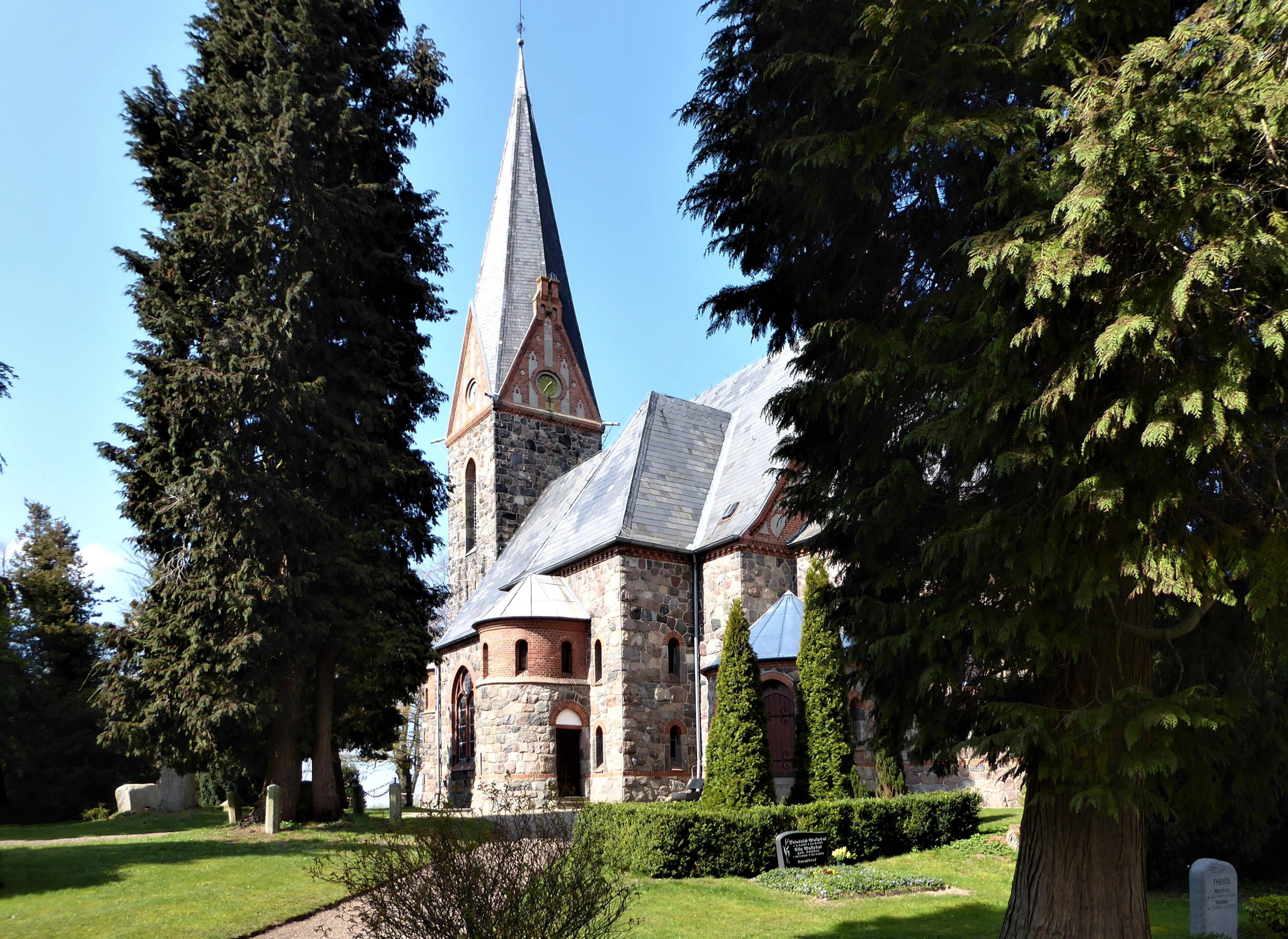
Christuskirche in Hansühn

Wangels is a municipality in Holstein, located directly on the Baltic Sea. It consists of 12 villages (Hansühn, Barensdorf, Döhnsdorf, Grammdorf, Hohenstein, Karlshof, Kreuzkate, Kükelühn, Meischenstorf, Neutestorf and Wasbuck). Hansühn is the largest and central village with approx. 750 inhabitants, where the municipal administration and the church are located.

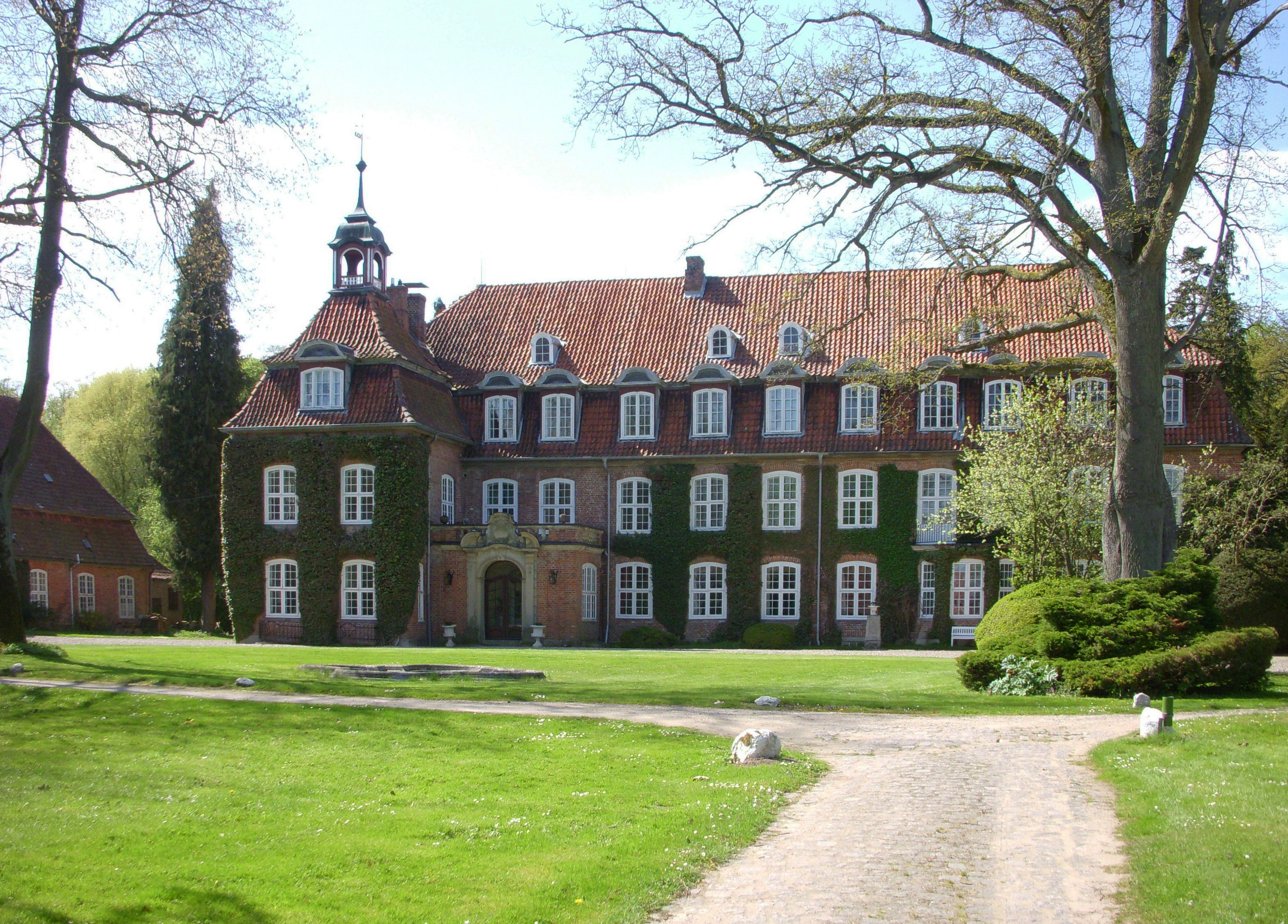
Testorf Manor House

Remarkable are the stately old manor houses: Charlottenhof, Ehlerstorf, Farve, Friederikenhof, Testorf and Weißenhaus.

Weißenhäuser Strand is a vacation resort on the Baltic Sea

Wangels is directly connected to the A1 highway via the B 202 motorway; the distance to the state capital Kiel is 48 km, to Hamburg 113 km.
