= Nihal Sarin =

Indian chess grandmaster (born 2004)

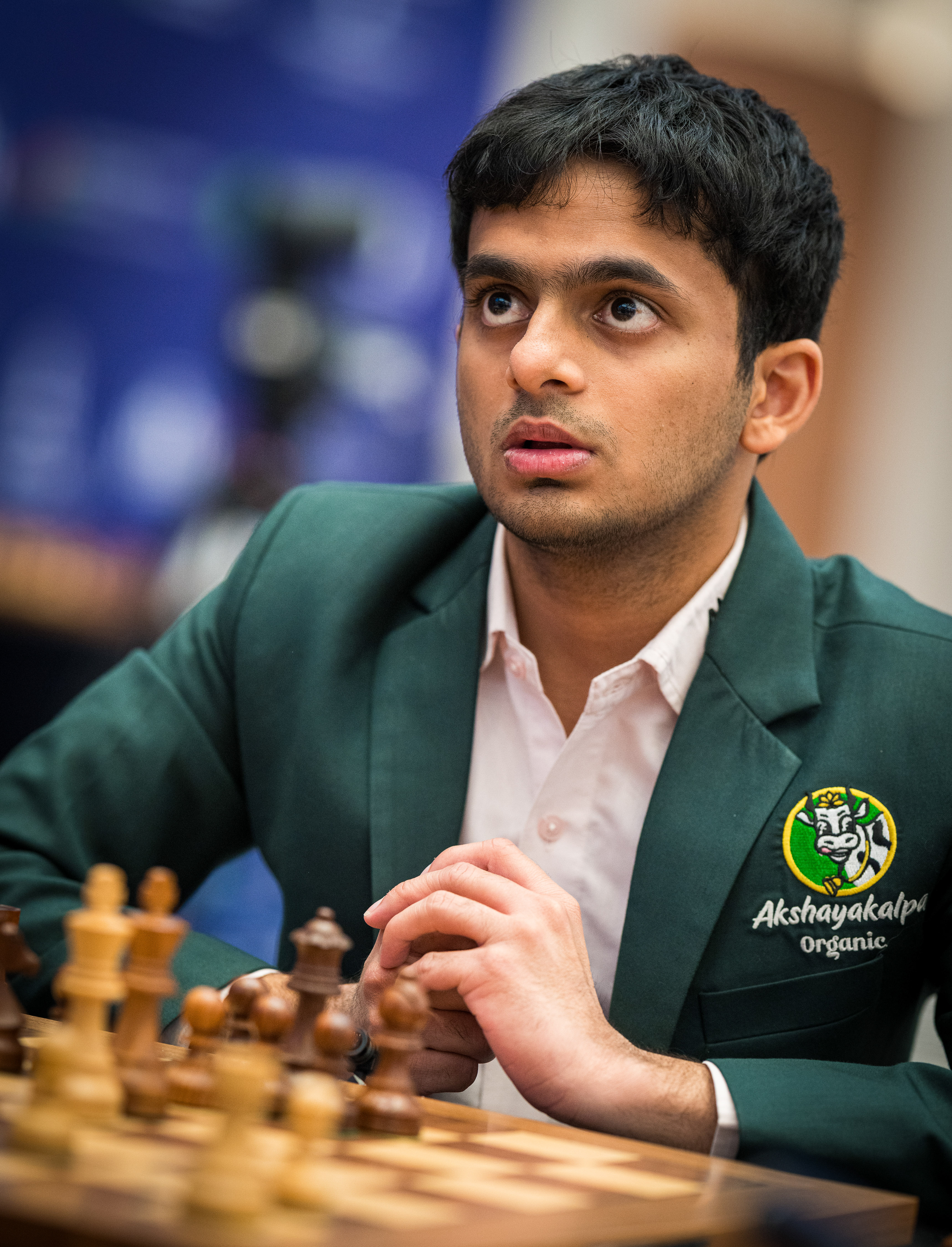
- Nihal playing in the 2023 FIDE World Rapid and Blitz Championship

Personal information
- Born: 13 July 2004 (age 22) Thrissur, Kerala, India

Chess career
- Country: India
- Title: Grandmaster (2018)
- FIDE rating: 2709 (October 2026)
- Peak rating: 2723 (April 2026)
- Ranking: No. 30 (October 2026)
- Peak ranking: No. 19 (November 2026)

Nihal Sarin (born 13 July 2004) is an Indian chess grandmaster. In 2018, he passed the Elo rating of 2600 at 14 years old, which at the time made him the third youngest player in history to do so.

As a former chess prodigy and junior player, Nihal was the World Under-10 champion in 2014 and placed 2nd in the 2015 World Under-12 championship. Nihal won the Gold Medal as part of the Indian team in the FIDE Online Chess Olympiad 2020. He won the U-18 World Youth Championship held online in rapid format in 2020. In 2026, he won the Rapid section of the Tata Steel Chess India.

== Early childhood ==
Nihal was born on 13 July 2004 in Thrissur, Kerala, India. Sarin Abdulsalam, Nihal's father, is a dermatologist while his mother, Shijin Ammanam Veetil Ummar, is a psychiatrist. He has a younger sister, Neha. His family spent their first few years in Kottayam.

He could recognize the capitals and the flags of 190 countries by the age of three. At the same age, he also had managed to know and recite from memory the scientific names of insects and plants. By the time he was in upper kindergarten, he spoke fluent English, and by the age of six, having just enrolled into first grade, he knew all the multiplication tables up to sixteen.

Nihal began learning chess at the age of six. In order for his son to not feel bored during school vacations, his father introduced Nihal to a chess set, and his grandfather A. A. Ummar taught him the rules at Kottayam, where he was a student of Excelsior English School. Nihal's first coach was Mathew Joseph Pottoore, the school's chess coach who instructed him twice a week in the beginning and then gave Sarin special individual classes.

In 2011, Nihal and his family returned to Thrissur where Nihal joined Devamatha CMI Public School.

== Junior career ==
Nihal won the Kerala State Championship in the Under-07 category in 2011, the Under-09 title twice, the Under-11 title twice, and the Under-15 title once. He became runner-up in 2015 State Senior championship in Irinjalakuda at the age of 10 years, thus becoming eligible to represent Kerala in the 2015 National Challengers Championship. He was twice the State Under-19 runner-up at the age of 8 and 10 years, respectively.

Nihal was the 2013 National Under-9 Champion in Chennai, the 2014 National Under-11 Bronze medalist in Puri, and the 2015 National Under-11 Silver medalist in Pondicherry.

Nihal won the gold medal in the World Blitz Championship in the Under-10 category in Al-Ain in 2013. In the same category, he was the Rapid and Blitz gold medalist in the Asian Youth Championship in Tashkent in 2014.

At the age of 10 in Thodupuzha, Nihal played simultaneously against 112 players of all age categories and won all his games.

At the end of 2013, Nihal began working with Ukrainian GM Dimitri Komarov, an experienced coach with international success in his playing days, whom he met by accident at a tournament while Komarov was coaching the United Arab Emirates team. Dimitri would go on to coach Nihal for several years.

=== 2014–2016: World Youth Championship and IM title ===
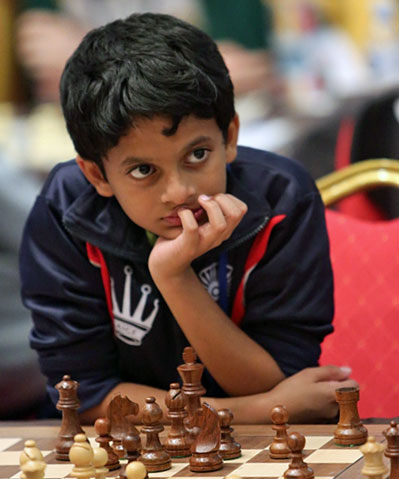
Nihal at World Youth Chess Championship in 2014

Nihal's first big break came at the World Youth Chess Championship in the Under-10 category, which was held in Durban, South Africa in September 2014. He scored 9/11 to be crowned the Under-10 World Champion. For this achievement, he was conferred the Candidate Master (CM) title by FIDE.

After his World Youth success in 2014, Nihal scored his first victory over a titled player, IM Jonathan Westerberg of Sweden, at the World Junior Championship 2014 in Pune, India. For a year, Nihal was a regular in all the tournaments of importance held in India, including the National Challengers Championship in Nagpur. He would regularly hold titled players to draws.

The next year in 2015, he won the silver medal in the Under-12 category of World Youth Chess Championship in Greece. In the last rounds of the tournament, Nihal successively defeated the top two seeds of his category: IM Awonder Liang and FM Nodirbek Abdusattorov. He was conferred the FIDE Master (FM) title by the World chess Federation in the same year as he had crossed live Elo rating of 2300.

He was a guest competitor in the Malayalam TV quiz show Aswamedham in March 2015.

In the 2016 edition of the tournament held in Batumi, Georgia, Nihal tied for the 2nd spot with three others. He was fourth on tiebreak.

In February 2016, Nihal played his first International Open outside India, the Cappelle-la-Grande Open, and registered his first International Master norm. In the process, he defeated a grandmaster for the first time in his career.

In Hasselbacken Open 2016 held at the turn of April in Stockholm, Nihal beat Lithuanian grandmaster Eduardas Rozentalis. The database website Chess-DB dubbed this performance as the "Game of the Day".

On Children's Day in 2016, Nihal was chosen as one of the recipients of the National Child Award For Exceptional Achievement, awarded by the former President of India Pranab Mukherjee.

At the Sunway Sitges Open 2016, Nihal registered his second International Master norm by scoring 5½/9. His third International Norm was registered in the Aeroflot B Open 2017 held in February, where Nihal scored 5½/9 as well, performing at 2539, to cross the 2400-mark and become an International Master.

=== 2017–2020: GM title ===
At the World Youth Chess Olympiad in December 2017, Nihal played for India Green, helping the country secure a silver medal. He also won an individual gold.

At the TV2 Fagernes International 2017, Nihal tied for the second place to finish with 6.0/9. He was fourth on the tiebreak and stayed undefeated throughout the tournament. In the process, he scored his maiden Grand Master norm. In 2017, Nihal increased his rating by 192 elo points to cross 2500 in rating.

At Reykjavik Open 2018 held in March, Nihal scored 6.0/9 with a rating performance of 2668 to score his second GM norm. He scored wins against grandmasters Ahmed Adly and Elshan Moradiabadi and drew with Richard Rapport, Gata Kamsky and Mustafa Yilmaz.

Nihal made his debut at the Isbank Turkish Super League in July 2018, leading the team Genc Akademisyenler on the first board. He scored 6.0/12 against an opposition made up of an average rating of 2590.

At the Abu Dhabi Masters 2018 held in August, Nihal tallied 5½/9 with a rating performance of 2626 to secure his third GM norm. He became the 53rd grandmaster of India and the twelfth youngest in history at the time. On the day Nihal had become a grandmaster, his home state Kerala was ravaged by the 2018 Kerala floods, the biggest natural disaster in the state's history. Nihal contributed by raising Rs. 174,463/- (approximately US$2500) via a live YouTube show hosted by Indian chess news portal ChessBase India.

Nihal competed in the Tata Steel Rapid Championship 2018. Starting as the last seed, Nihal scored 3.0/9, with draws against Viswanathan Anand, Shakhriyar Mamedyarov, Sergey Karjakin, Pentala Harikrishna, Vidit Gujrathi, and Surya Shekhar Ganguly, losing only three games to Hikaru Nakamura, Levon Aronian, and Wesley So. The event marked Nihal's first game against the legendary five-time world champion Anand who graciously commented after the game, "Going by the evidence so far, I would not rule it out (Nihal becoming a world champion in future). It’s a long journey forward. At the end, he is just 14. I felt that he would really struggle in this tournament and he would be a bit out of place. It seemed the opposite. He seemed quite comfortable here. Not fully there, but he’s a huge talent what I’ve seen of him.”

Nihal ended 2018 at the World Blitz Championship in Saint Petersburg, Russia where he scored 13½/21 with a rating performance of 2777, taking the 11th place on tiebreak.

In the 2019 TePe Sigeman & Co. Masters tournament held in Malmo, Sweden, Nihal finished 6th place to cross the 2600 Elo mark in rating. He was the third youngest player in history and the youngest Indian to do so at the time. At the 2019 French Team Chess Championship, Nihal scored 6.0/11 on the first board and helped Mulhouse Philidor finish a historic third place. In the 2019 Asian Blitz Championship, Nihal finished first with 8.0/9, ahead of Alireza Firouzja.

At age 15, Nihal became the youngest Indian to play in the 2019 World Cup, where he managed to reach the second round after beating Peruvian Jorge Cori 2–0 in the first round. In the second round, Nihal beat Azerbaijani GM Eltaj Safarli. Nihal lost the second round and the tiebreakers to crash out of the tournament.

Since 2019, Nihal is sponsored by Akshayakalpa, an Indian Organic Milk Company.

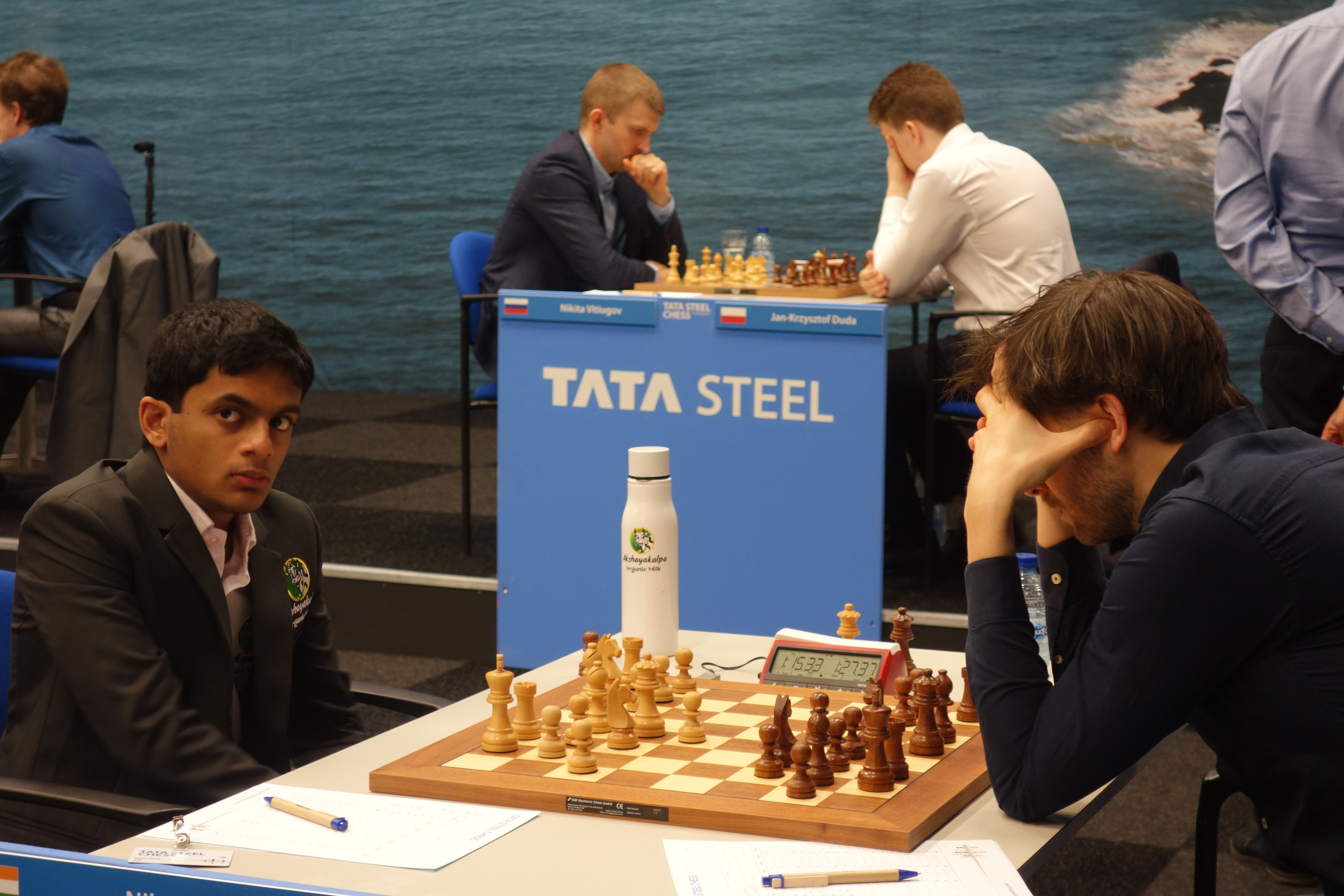
Nihal versus Nils Grandelius in the 2020 Tata Steel Chess Tournament

In January 2020, Nihal competed in the Tata Steel Challengers tournament and scored 7.0/13 to share the sixth spot. Nihal was a part of the Indian Chess Team that won the FIDE Online Chess Olympiad 2020.

After the Online Chess Olympiad 2020, Nihal's run of wins continued with him winning the Junior Speed Chess Championship conducted by Chess.com. A few weeks later he went to win the Capechecs Online Trophy in October 2020. He also helped the Indian team win the silver medal at the Asian Teams Online Championship 2020. On 10 December, Nihal registered his third successful win by defeating Arjun Erigaisi in the finals of the Super Juniors Cup organized by Chessbase India. His fourth tournament win for the year 2020 came after he defeated GM Shant Sargsyan of Armenia in the finals of the World Youth Chess Championship 2020 held online and organized by FIDE. He was crowned under-18 World Youth Chess Champion on 22 December 2020, and won the Gazprom Brilliancy Prize for his game against IM Francesco Sonis.

Nihal won the World Online Youth Championships 2020 in the Under-18 category by defeating GM Shant Sargsyan from Armenia.

=== 2021 ===
In April 2021, Nihal participated in the Julius Baer Challengers Chess Tour, becoming one of 19 young chess players who were selected to receive training sessions from Judit Polgár and Vladimir Kramnik as well as participating in a number of head-to-head games against various grandmasters. On 19 April 2021, the 19 participants faced off against then-world champion Magnus Carlsen in a Blitz format with 3 minutes being allotted per game with no time increment. Nihal was among two of the 19 participants who were able to defeat Carlsen in the event. This game marked Nihal's first victory against the world champion in an official event. Nihal had previously beaten Carlsen in an unofficial online Blitz game on 27 May 2020, prompting the world champion to remark that Nihal was "one of the young guns" and "one of the better blitz players around".

In June 2021, playing the Silver Lake Open in Serbia, his first over the board tournament since the onset of the COVID-19 pandemic, Nihal scored 8.0/9 with a 2807 rating performance to take first place. In July 2021, Nihal won his second consecutive tournament by winning the Serbia Open Masters in Belgrade with 7.5/9 and a rating performance of 2786. In the 2021 Biel Chess Festival, Nihal finished third behind Gata Kamsky and Kirill Alekseenko.

In October 2021, Nihal defeated Raunak Sadhwani to win his second Chess.com Junior Speed Chess Championship. In the 2021 Speed Chess Championship, Nihal defeated Alexander Grischuk 15.5–10.5, Richard Rapport 18.0–9.0, before being defeated by Wesley So 14.0–15.0 in the semifinals.

== Adult career ==
=== 2022–2026: Peak ranking ===
In August 2022, Nihal played on the second board for India-2 scoring a vital 7½/10 with a performance rating of 2774. Nihal won the Tata Steel Rapid Championship 2022 with a round to spare. He scored 6.5/9 to finish ahead of Hikaru Nakamura, Wesley So, D. Gukesh, Arjun Erigaisi and others.

Nihal played the first edition of Chess.com Global Championship. Nihal advanced to the 8-player knockout by defeating Rauf Mamedov, 14th World Champion Vladimir Kramnik, and the 17th World Champion Ding Liren. In the knock-out phase held in Toronto and Belgrade, Nihal won against Samuel Sevian followed by a thrilling match against Anish Giri, taking the match on armageddon tiebreaks. In the final, Nihal was defeated by Wesley So to finish second place.

In November–December 2022, Nihal won the Tata Steel Chess India 2022 Rapid Open in Kolkata, scoring 6½/9.

In the 2022 Speed Chess Championship Nihal defeated Anish Giri 15.0–14.0 and Ding Liren 17.0–9.0 to reach the Semifinals where he lost to Hikaru Nakamura 10.5–14.5. In the match against World No. 2 Ding Liren, Nihal won praise for his sportsmanship when he resigned in three moves against after the Chinese player lost the previous game due to poor internet connection.

For the first time, Nihal broke into the 2700 barrier in live rating after he won with the black pieces against GM Paulius Pultinevicius in Round 2 of the European Chess Club Cup in 2023.

In March 2025, Nihal won the Tashkent Open with an unbeaten score of 8/10. In May, he finished 2nd at Asian Individual Chess Championships 2025, scoring 7 points.

In July–August 2025, Nihal represented S8UL Esports at the inaugural 2025 Esports World Cup – Chess in Riyadh. He earned his place in the 16-player main event through the Last Chance Qualifier, defeating Andrey Esipenko in the winners' bracket to become the first of four players to qualify from a field of more than 135 entrants. After an opening-day loss to Arjun Erigaisi in the group stage, he won successive lower-bracket matches against Anish Giri and Maxime Vachier-Lagrave to reach the quarterfinals, where he was defeated 2.5–0.5 by eventual champion Magnus Carlsen. Nihal's quarterfinal finish earned him $85,000 in prize money from the tournament's $1.5 million prize pool.

In January 2026, Nihal won the Tata Steel Chess India 2026 Rapid Open in Kolkata with a score of 6½/9.

In April 2026, Sarin won the Menorca Open 2026, scoring 6/10.

In June 2026, Sarin won the Bullet Chess Championship, hosted by Chess.com. After losing to Alireza Firouzja in the winners' bracket, he advanced through the losers' bracket to earn a rematch in the Grand Final. As Firouzja had reached the final undefeated, the double-elimination format required Sarin to defeat him in two consecutive matches. Sarin won the bracket-reset match by a score of 15.5–7.5 and then the deciding championship match by 9.5–5.5 to claim his first Bullet Chess Championship title. Across both matches, he recorded a 15-game winning streak, including the final ten games of the bracket-reset match and the opening five games of the deciding match.

In August 2026, Nihal again reached the quarterfinals of the 2026 Esports World Cup – Chess (having qualified via the Champions Chess Tour 2025–2026) in Paris, representing S8UL Esports. He progressed through the lower bracket with wins over Wei Yi and Jan-Krzysztof Duda. He was eliminated 2.5–0.5 by defending champion Magnus Carlsen in a rematch of the previous year's quarterfinal, finishing in the top eight and earning $75,000 in prize money.

== Training ==
Nihal's first coach was Mathew P. Joseph Pottoore, a chess coach at his school. Nirmal E P, the Kerala State Champion, started training Nihal when he was eight years old.

Nihal was trained by Dimitri Komarov from 2013 to 2019. He was also trained by Srinath Narayanan from 2016 to 2022. Since late 2020, Nihal is also trained by Viswanathan Anand as part of the WestBridge-Anand Chess Academy. He started working with GM Vishnu Prasanna V.
