= Vishnu Prasanna V. =

Indian chess grandmaster (born 1989)

Personal information
- Born: 12 August 1989 (age 36) Madras, India

Chess career
- Country: India
- Title: Grandmaster (2013)
- Peak rating: 2543 (September 2017)

Vishnu Prasanna Vasanthan Perumal is an Indian chess grandmaster and coach.

== Chess career ==
Vishnu began playing chess at the age of 12 after being introduced to the game by his mother.

He won the 2013 Chennai Blitz Championship, remaining undefeated throughout the tournament and defeating grandmasters J. Deepan Chakkravarthy, Adhiban Baskaran, and Shyam Sundar M.

== Coaching ==
In 2013, Vishnu turned to coaching shortly after earning the Grandmaster title. He is best known for having coached future World Champion Gukesh D, whom he first met in July 2017.

In November 2022, Vishnu and his wife launched a chess club in the Anna Nagar neighborhood of Chennai. The club was inaugurated by Viswanathan Anand. In March 2024, Vishnu started coaching Nihal Sarin.
