= Grand Chess Tour 2019 =

Chess competition

Grand Chess Tour
- 2019
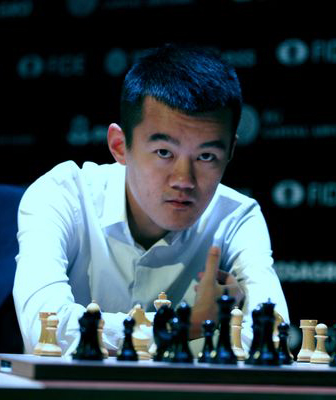
- 2019 Grand Chess Tour winner Ding Liren.

Tournament information
- Dates: 6 May–10 December 2019
- Host(s): Abidjan; Zagreb; Paris; St. Louis; Bucharest; Kolkata; London

Final positions
- Champion: (China) Ding Liren
- Runner-up: (France) Maxime Vachier-Lagrave
- 3rd place: (Norway) Magnus Carlsen

Tournament statistics
- Most tournament titles: (Norway) Magnus Carlsen (3)
- Prize money leader: (Norway) Magnus Carlsen ($302,500)
- Points leader: (Norway) Magnus Carlsen (67.5)

The Grand Chess Tour 2019 was a series of chess tournaments, held in from 6 May to 10 December 2019. It was the fifth edition of Grand Chess Tour. The tour consisted of 8 tournaments, including 2 classical, 5 fast tournaments and tour final in London, the United Kingdom. It was won by Ding Liren of China.

== Format ==
The tour featured 8 tournaments, and total number of 26 players, including 12 full participants and 14 wildcard. Top 4 after 7 tournaments qualifies to the tour finals in London. The points awarded as follows:

Place	Points (classical)	Points (rapid/blitz)
1st	18/20*	12/13*
2nd	15	10
3rd	12	8
4th	10	7
5th	8	6
6th	7	5
7th	6	4
8th	5	3
9th	4	2
10th	3	1
11th	2	N/A
12th	1	N/A

== Lineup ==
Participants of the 2019 edition were announced on January 24, 2019. Players were selected by different criteria, including top three finish in previous edition, Universal Rating System, average FIDE rating and personal selection by organizers. Total number of participants were 12, largest since the introduction of tour in 2015.

Player	Country	FIDE Rating (January 2019)	Selection criteria
Hikaru Nakamura	United States	2749	Winner of Grand Chess Tour 2018
Maxime Vachier-Lagrave	France	2780	Runner-up of 2018 Grand Chess Tour
Fabiano Caruana	United States	2828	Third place in 2018 Grand Chess Tour
Magnus Carlsen	Norway	2835	URS
Shakhriyar Mamedyarov	Azerbaijan	2817	URS
Ding Liren	China	2813	URS
Levon Aronian	Armenia	2767	URS
Anish Giri	Netherlands	2783	Average FIDE rating
Wesley So	United States	2765	Average FIDE rating
Viswanathan Anand	India	2773	Average FIDE rating
Ian Nepomniachtchi	Russia	2763	Wild card
Sergey Karjakin	Russia	2753	Replacement for Vladimir Kramnik

== Schedule and results ==
Dates	Tournament Name	Host city	Winner	Runner-up	Third place
6–13 May 2019	Cote d'Ivoire Rapid & Blitz	Abidjan	Magnus Carlsen	Maxime Vachier-Lagrave; Hikaru Nakamura	–
24 June – 9 July 2019	Croatia Grand Chess Tour	Zagreb	Magnus Carlsen	Wesley So	Levon Aronian; Fabiano Caruana
26 July – 6 August 2019	Paris Rapid & Blitz	Paris	Maxime Vachier-Lagrave	Viswanathan Anand	Ian Nepomniachtchi; Alexander Grischuk (WC)
8–15 August 2019	Saint Louis Rapid & Blitz	St. Louis	Levon Aronian	Ding Liren; Yu Yangyi (WC); Maxime Vachier-Lagrave	–
15–30 August 2019	Sinquefield Cup	St. Louis	Ding Liren	Magnus Carlsen	Sergey Karjakin; Viswanathan Anand
4–11 November 2019	Superbet Rapid & Blitz	Bucharest	Levon Aronian	Sergey Karjakin	Viswanathan Anand
20–27 November 2019	Tata Steel India Rapid & Blitz	Kolkata	Magnus Carlsen	Hikaru Nakamura	Anish Giri; Wesley So
30 November – 10 December 2019	London Chess Classic	London	Ding Liren	Maxime Vachier-Lagrave	Magnus Carlsen

== Tournaments ==
=== Cote d'Ivoire Rapid & Blitz ===
2019 GCT Cote d'Ivoire Rapid & Blitz, May 8–13 Abidjan, Ivory Coast
	Player	Rapid	Blitz	Total	TB	Tour Points	Prize money
1	Magnus Carlsen (NOR)	15	11½	26½		13	$37,500
2	Hikaru Nakamura (USA)	12	11	23		9	$22,500
3	Maxime Vachier-Lagrave (FRA)	11	12	23		9	$22,500
4	Wesley So (USA)	11	8½	19½		7	$15,000
5	Ding Liren (CHN)	10	8½	18½		6	$12,500
6	Wei Yi (CHN)	9	7½	16½		WC (5)	$10,000
7	Ian Nepomniachtchi (RUS)	5	10½	15½		3.5	$7,500
8	Sergey Karjakin (RUS)	6	9½	15½		3.5	$7,500
9	Veselin Topalov (BUL)	6	5½	11½		WC (2)	$7,500
10	Bassem Amin (EGY)	5	5½	10½		WC (1)	$7,500

Cote d'Ivoire Grand Chess Tour Rapid, 8–10 May 2019, Abidjan, Ivory Coast
	Player	Rating	1	2	3	4	5	6	7	8	9	10	Points
1	Magnus Carlsen (Norway)	2869		1	2	2	1	2	1	2	2	2	15
2	Hikaru Nakamura (United States)	2824	1		1	2	2	1	2	1	0	2	12
3	Wesley So (United States)	2801	0	1		1	1	1	1	2	2	2	11
4	Maxime Vachier-Lagrave (France)	2800	0	0	1		1	2	2	1	2	2	11
5	Ding Liren (China)	2760i	1	0	1	1		0	1	2	2	2	10
6	Wei Yi (China)	2698	0	1	1	0	2		1	1	2	1	9
7	Veselin Topalov (Bulgaria)	2781	1	0	1	0	1	1		1	0	1	6
8	Sergey Karjakin (Russia)	2781	0	1	0	1	0	1	1		1	1	6
9	Bassem Amin (Egypt)	2617	0	2	0	0	0	0	2	1		0	5
10	Ian Nepomniachtchi (Russia)	2785	0	0	0	0	0	1	1	1	2		5

Cote d'Ivoire Grand Chess Tour Blitz, 11–12 May 2019, Abidjan, Ivory Coast
	Player	Rating	1	2	3	4	5	6	7	8	9	10	Points
1	Maxime Vachier-Lagrave (France)	2933		1 1	1 0	½ 1	½ 0	1 0	½ ½	1 1	0 1	1 1	12
2	Magnus Carlsen (Norway)	2954	0 0		½ 1	½ ½	1 1	½ ½	½ ½	½ 1	1 1	½ 1	11½
3	Hikaru Nakamura (United States)	2934	0 1	½ 0		½ 1	½ ½	1 1	1 ½	½ 1	½ 1	0 ½	11
4	Ian Nepomniachtchi (Russia)	2778	½ 0	½ ½	½ 0		0 ½	½ ½	1 1	1 ½	½ 1	1 1	10½
5	Sergey Karjakin (Russia)	2817	½ 1	0 0	½ ½	1 ½		½ ½	0 0	½ 1	0 1	1 1	9½
6	Wesley So (United States)	2744	0 1	½ ½	0 0	½ ½	½ ½		½ 1	½ ½	½ ½	½ ½	8½
7	Ding Liren (China)	2773	½ ½	½ ½	0 ½	0 0	1 1	½ 0		½ ½	1 ½	1 0	8½
8	Wei Yi (China)	2641	0 0	½ 0	½ 0	0 ½	½ 0	½ ½	½ ½		1 ½	1 1	7½
9	Veselin Topalov (Bulgaria)	2682	1 0	0 0	½ 0	½ 0	1 0	½ ½	0 ½	0 ½		0 ½	5½
10	Bassem Amin (Egypt)	2662	0 0	½ 0	1 ½	0 0	0 0	½ ½	0 1	0 0	1 ½		5½

=== Croatia Grand Chess Tour ===
Zagreb Chess Classic, 24 June – 9 July 2019, Zagreb, Croatia, Category XXII (2782)
	Player	Rating	1	2	3	4	5	6	7	8	9	10	11	12	Points	TB	Place	TPR	GCT Points
1	Magnus Carlsen (Norway)	2875		½	½	½	1	1	1	½	1	½	½	1	8		1	2955	20
2	Wesley So (United States)	2754	½		½	½	1	½	½	½	½	1	½	1	7		2	2893	15
3	Levon Aronian (Armenia)	2752	½	½		½	½	½	½	1	½	½	½	½	6		3–4	2821	11
4	Fabiano Caruana (United States)	2819	½	½	½		½	½	0	½	1	½	½	1	6		3–4	2815	11
5	Ding Liren (China)	2805	0	0	½	½		1	1	½	½	½	½	½	5½		5–7	2780	7
6	Anish Giri (Netherlands)	2779	0	½	½	½	0		1	½	½	1	½	½	5½		5–7	2782	7
7	Ian Nepomniachtchi (Russia)	2775	0	½	½	1	0	0		½	½	1	1	½	5½		5–7	2782	7
8	Sergey Karjakin (Russia)	2748	½	½	0	½	½	½	½		½	½	½	½	5		8	2748	5
9	Maxime Vachier-Lagrave (France)	2779	0	½	½	0	½	½	½	½		½	½	½	4½		9–11	2709	3
10	Shakhriyar Mamedyarov (Azerbaijan)	2774	½	0	½	½	½	0	0	½	½		1	½	4½		9–11	2710	3
11	Viswanathan Anand (India)	2767	½	½	½	½	½	½	0	½	½	0		½	4½		9–11	2710	3
12	Hikaru Nakamura (United States)	2754	0	0	½	0	½	½	½	½	½	½	½		4		12	2675	1

=== Paris Rapid & Blitz ===
Paris Grand Chess Tour was held on July 27–August 1, 2019, in Paris, France. It was won by French grandmaster Maxime Vachier-Lagrave, who scored 21 points.

2019 GCT Paris Rapid & Blitz, July 27–August 1 Paris, France
	Player	Rapid	Blitz	Total	TB	Tour Points	Prize money
1	Maxime Vachier-Lagrave (FRA)	13	8	21		13	$37,500
2	Viswanathan Anand (IND)	10	10½	20½		10	$25,000
3	Alexander Grischuk (RUS)	12	8	20		WC (7.5)	$17,500
4	Ian Nepomniachtchi (RUS)	10	10	20		7.5	$17,500
5	Jan-Krzysztof Duda (POL)	9	10½	19½		WC (6)	$12,500
6	Fabiano Caruana (USA)	9	10	19		5	$10,000
7	Hikaru Nakamura (USA)	8	10½	18½		4	$7,500
8	Shakhriyar Mamedyarov (AZE)	7	8	15		3	$7,500
9	Daniil Dubov (RUS)	7	7	14		WC (2)	$7,500
10	Anish Giri (NED)	5	7½	12½		1	$7,500

Paris Grand Chess Tour Rapid, 27–29 July 2019, Paris, France
	Player	Rating	1	2	3	4	5	6	7	8	9	10	Points
1	Maxime Vachier-Lagrave (France)	2812		1	0	1	2	2	1	2	2	2	13
2	Alexander Grischuk (Russia)	2744	1		2	1	2	0	2	1	2	1	12
3	Ian Nepomniachtchi (Russia)	2757	2	0		0	2	2	2	0	1	1	10
4	Viswanathan Anand (India)	2735	1	1	2		1	1	1	0	1	2	10
5	Fabiano Caruana (United States)	2817	0	0	0	1		2	2	2	1	1	9
6	Jan-Krzysztof Duda (Poland)	2731	0	2	0	1	0		1	2	1	2	9
7	Hikaru Nakamura (United States)	2853	1	0	0	1	0	1		2	2	1	8
8	Shakhriyar Mamedyarov (Azerbaijan)	2810	0	1	2	2	0	0	0		0	2	7
9	Daniil Dubov (Russia)	2771	0	0	1	1	1	1	0	2		1	7
10	Anish Giri (Netherlands)	2769	0	1	1	0	1	0	1	0	1		5

Paris Grand Chess Tour Blitz, 31 July–1 August 2019, Paris, France
	Player	Rating	1	2	3	4	5	6	7	8	9	10	Points
1	Viswanathan Anand (India)	2730		1 ½	½ 1	½ 1	1 1	0 ½	0 ½	½ 1	1 ½	0 0	10½
2	Jan-Krzysztof Duda (Poland)	2778	0 ½		0 ½	½ 1	0 1	1 ½	1 1	1 1	0 1	½ 0	10½
3	Hikaru Nakamura (United States)	2902	½ 0	1 ½		½ ½	0 1	1 0	1 0	1 0	½ 1	1 1	10½
4	Ian Nepomniachtchi (Russia)	2815	½ 0	½ 0	½ ½		1 1	0 1	½ 1	½ 0	1 ½	1 ½	10
5	Fabiano Caruana (United States)	2772	0 0	1 0	1 0	0 0		1 1	0 1	½ 1	1 ½	1 1	10
6	Shakhriyar Mamedyarov (Azerbaijan)	2778	1 ½	0 ½	0 1	1 0	0 0		0 ½	1 ½	0 1	½ ½	8
7	Maxime Vachier-Lagrave (France)	2948	1 ½	0 0	0 1	½ 0	1 0	1 ½		0 ½	0 0	1 1	8
8	Alexander Grischuk (Russia)	2733	½ 0	0 0	0 1	½ 1	½ 0	0 ½	1 ½		½ 1	½ ½	8
9	Anish Giri (Netherlands)	2770	0 ½	1 0	½ 0	0 ½	0 ½	1 0	1 1	½ 0		0 1	7½
10	Daniil Dubov (Russia)	2642	1 1	½ 1	0 0	0 ½	0 0	½ ½	0 0	½ ½	1 0		7

=== Saint Louis Rapid & Blitz ===
Saint Louis Rapid and Blitz took place in St. Louis, Missouri on August 10–14. It was won by Levon Aronian. Tournament is notable for somewhat poor performance by incumbent World Champion Magnus Carlsen, who finished on sixth place, which was his worst result since 2017.

2019 GCT Saint Louis Rapid & Blitz, August 10–14 St. Louis, Missouri, United States
	Player	Rapid	Blitz	Total	TB	Tour Points	Prize money
1	Levon Aronian (ARM)	13	9	22		13	$37,500
2	Yu Yangyi (CHN)	10	11½	21½		WC (8.3)	$20,000
3	Ding Liren (CHN)	10	11½	21½		8.3	$20,000
4	Maxime Vachier-Lagrave (FRA)	13	8½	21½		8.3	$20,000
5	Sergey Karjakin (RUS)	8	11½	19½		6	$12,500
6	Magnus Carlsen (NOR)	8	9	17		5	$10,000
7	Richárd Rapport (HUN)	8	8½	16½		WC (4)	$7,500
8	Fabiano Caruana (USA)	8	7	15		3	$7,500
9	Leinier Domínguez (USA)	7	6½	13½		WC (2)	$7,500
10	Shakhriyar Mamedyarov (AZE)	5	7	12		1	$7,500

Saint Louis Grand Chess Tour Rapid, 10–12 August 2019, Saint Louis, United States
	Player	Rating	1	2	3	4	5	6	7	8	9	10	Points
1	Maxime Vachier-Lagrave (France)	2843		0	2	1	0	2	2	2	2	2	13
2	Levon Aronian (Armenia)	2704	2		1	1	2	2	2	0	1	2	13
3	Ding Liren (China)	2786	0	1		2	2	1	1	1	1	1	10
4	Yu Yangyi (China)	2775	1	1	0		1	2	1	0	2	2	10
5	Magnus Carlsen (Norway)	2895	2	0	0	1		0	0	2	2	1	8
6	Fabiano Caruana (United States)	2807	0	0	1	0	2		1	2	1	1	8
7	Sergey Karjakin (Russia)	2759	0	0	1	1	2	1		1	0	2	8
8	Richárd Rapport (Hungary)	2719	0	2	1	2	0	0	1		0	2	8
9	Leinier Domínguez (United States)	2769	0	1	1	0	0	1	2	2		0	7
10	Shakhriyar Mamedyarov (Azerbaijan)	2787	0	0	1	0	1	1	0	0	2		5

Saint Louis Grand Chess Tour Blitz, 13–14 August 2019, Saint Louis, United States
	Player	Rating	1	2	3	4	5	6	7	8	9	10	Points
1	Yu Yangyi (China)	2718		0 1	½ 1	½ ½	1 1	0 1	½ 1	1 0	1 ½	1 0	11½
2	Sergey Karjakin (Russia)	2798	1 0		½ 0	½ 1	1 0	½ 1	0 1	1 1	1 0	1 1	11½
3	Ding Liren (China)	2779	½ 0	½ 1		½ 0	1 0	1 1	½ 1	1 1	½ ½	1 ½	11½
4	Levon Aronian (Armenia)	2840	½ ½	½ 0	½ 1		½ ½	0 0	½ 1	½ ½	1 1	0 ½	9
5	Magnus Carlsen (Norway)	2920	0 0	0 1	0 1	½ ½		1 ½	1 ½	½ 0	1 1	½ 0	9
6	Maxime Vachier-Lagrave (France)	2939	1 0	½ 0	0 0	1 1	0 ½		0 1	1 0	1 ½	0 1	8½
7	Richárd Rapport (Hungary)	2736	½ 0	1 0	½ 0	½ 0	0 ½	1 0		1 1	1 0	½ 1	8½
8	Fabiano Caruana (United States)	2772	0 1	0 0	0 0	½ ½	½ 1	0 1	0 0		0 1	½ 1	7
9	Shakhriyar Mamedyarov (Azerbaijan)	2787	0 ½	0 1	½ ½	0 0	0 0	0 ½	0 1	1 0		1 1	7
10	Leinier Domínguez (United States)	2703	0 1	0 0	0 ½	1 ½	½ 1	1 0	½ 0	½ 0	0 0		6½

=== Sinquefield Cup ===
7th Sinquefield Cup, 17–29 August 2019, St. Louis, Missouri, United States, Category XXII (2783)
	Player	Rating	1	2	3	4	5	6	7	8	9	10	11	12	Points	TB	Place	TPR	GCT Points
1	Ding Liren (China)	2805		½	½	½	1	1	½	½	½	½	½	½	6½	3	1	2845	16½
2	Magnus Carlsen (Norway)	2882	½		½	½	½	½	½	½	1	½	1	½	6½	1	2	2838	16½
3	Viswanathan Anand (India)	2756	½	½		½	½	½	1	½	½	½	½	½	6		3–4	2820	11
4	Sergey Karjakin (Russia)	2750	½	½	½		½	½	½	½	1	½	½	½	6		3–4	2821	11
5	Fabiano Caruana (United States)	2818	0	½	½	½		½	½	½	½	½	½	1	5½		5–8	2779	6½
6	Anish Giri (Netherlands)	2779	0	½	½	½	½		1	½	½	½	½	½	5½		5–8	2782	6½
7	Ian Nepomniachtchi (Russia)	2774	½	½	0	½	½	0		½	0	1	1	1	5½		5–8	2783	6½
8	Shakhriyar Mamedyarov (Azerbaijan)	2764	½	½	½	½	½	½	½		½	½	½	½	5½		5–8	2784	6½
9	Maxime Vachier-Lagrave (France)	2778	½	0	½	0	½	½	1	½		½	½	½	5		9–10	2746	3½
10	Hikaru Nakamura (United States)	2743	½	½	½	½	½	½	0	½	½		½	½	5		9–10	2750	3½
11	Wesley So (United States)	2776	½	0	½	½	½	½	0	½	½	½		½	4½		11–12	2718	1½
12	Levon Aronian (Armenia)	2765	½	½	½	½	0	½	0	½	½	½	½		4½		11–12	2719	1½

First place playoff
Place	Player	Rapid rating	Blitz rating	Rapid		Blitz		Score
1	Ding Liren (China)	2786	2779	½	½	1	1	3
2	Magnus Carlsen (Norway)	2895	2920	½	½	0	0	1

=== Superbet Rapid & Blitz ===
Superbet Rapid and Blitz took place in Bucharest, Romania on November 6–11. It was won by Levon Aronian, who defeated Sergey Karjakin in play-off and secured place in Grand Chess Tour finals after this victory.

2019 GCT Supernet Rapid & Blitz, November 6–10 Bucharest, Romania
	Player	Rapid	Blitz	Total	TB	Tour Points	Prize money
1	Levon Aronian (ARM)	10	10	20	1½	11	$31,250
2	Sergey Karjakin (RUS)	9	11	20	½	11	$31,250
3	Viswanathan Anand (IND)	9	10½	19½		8	$20,000
4	Lê Quang Liêm (VIE)	8	11	19		WC (7)	$15,000
5	Anton Korobov (UKR)	12	6½	18½		WC (6)	$12,500
6	Anish Giri (NED)	10	8	18		4.5	$8,750
7	Vladislav Artemiev (RUS)	8	10	18		WC (4.5)	$8,750
8	Shakhriyar Mamedyarov (AZE)	10	6½	16½		2.5	$7,500
9	Wesley So (USA)	6	10½	16½		2.5	$7,500
10	Fabiano Caruana (USA)	8	6	14		1	$7,500

Romania Grand Chess Tour Rapid, 6–8 November 2019, București, Romania
	Player	Rating	1	2	3	4	5	6	7	8	9	10	Points
1	Anton Korobov (Ukraine)	2798		1	1	1	2	1	1	2	1	2	12
2	Levon Aronian (Armenia)	2768	1		1	1	0	1	2	1	1	2	10
3	Shakhriyar Mamedyarov (Azerbaijan)	2734	1	1		2	1	1	2	1	1	0	10
4	Anish Giri (Netherlands)	2705	1	1	0		1	2	1	0	2	2	10
5	Viswanathan Anand (India)	2757	0	2	1	1		0	2	2	0	1	9
6	Sergey Karjakin (Russia)	2756	1	1	1	0	2		0	2	1	1	9
7	Fabiano Caruana (United States)	2791	1	0	0	1	0	2		0	2	2	8
8	Vladislav Artemiev (Russia)	2768	0	1	1	2	0	0	2		1	1	8
9	Lê Quang Liêm (Vietnam)	2746	1	1	1	0	2	1	0	1		1	8
10	Wesley So (United States)	2802	0	0	2	0	1	1	0	1	1		6

Romania Grand Chess Tour Blitz, 9–10 November 2019, București, Romania
	Player	Rating	1	2	3	4	5	6	7	8	9	10	Points
1	Le Quang Liem (Vietnam)	2680		½ 0	1 0	1 ½	½ 0	1 ½	1 0	½ 1	1 1	½ 1	11
2	Sergey Karjakin (Russia)	2829	½ 1		0 ½	1 ½	½ 1	½ ½	1 ½	1 ½	½ ½	0 1	11
3	Wesley So (United States)	2763	0 1	1 ½		½ ½	0 1	½ 0	½ ½	½ ½	½ 1	1 1	10½
4	Viswanathan Anand (India)	2791	0 ½	0 ½	½ ½		½ ½	1 ½	½ ½	1 1	1 1	0 1	10½
5	Levon Aronian (Armenia)	2818	½ 1	½ 0	1 0	½ ½		1 0	½ ½	½ 1	½ 1	½ ½	10
6	Vladislav Artemiev (Russia)	2779	0 ½	½ ½	½ 1	0 ½	0 1		½ 1	½ ½	½ 1	½ 1	10
7	Anish Giri (Netherlands)	2740	0 1	0 ½	½ ½	½ ½	½ ½	½ 0		½ ½	½ ½	½ ½	8
8	Shakhriyar Mamedyarov (Azerbaijan)	2737	½ 0	0 ½	½ ½	0 0	½ 0	½ ½	½ ½		0 0	1 1	6½
9	Anton Korobov (Ukraine)	2771	0 0	½ ½	½ 0	0 0	½ 0	½ 0	½ ½	1 1		1 0	6½
10	Fabiano Caruana (United States)	2774	½ 0	1 0	0 0	1 0	½ ½	½ 0	½ ½	0 0	0 1		6

First place playoff
Place	Player	Rapid rating	Rapid		Score
1	Levon Aronian (Armenia)	2768	½	1	1½
2	Sergey Karjakin (Russia)	2756	½	0	½

=== Tata Steel India Rapid & Blitz ===
Tata Steel India 2019 was played in Kolkata, India on November 22–26. It was won by Magnus Carlsen, who achieved biggest victory in Grand Chess Tour event by scoring 27 points.

2019 Tata Steel India Rapid & Blitz, November 22–26 Kolkata, India
	Player	Rapid	Blitz	Total	TB	Tour Points	Prize money
1	Magnus Carlsen (NOR)	15	12	27		13	$37,500
2	Hikaru Nakamura (USA)	11	12	23		10	$25,000
3	Wesley So (USA)	9	9½	18½		7.5	$17,500
4	Anish Giri (NED)	9	9½	18½		7.5	$17,500
5	Ding Liren (CHN)	8	10	18		6	$12,500
6	Ian Nepomniachtchi (RUS)	7	10	17		5	$10,000
7	Viswanathan Anand (IND)	8	8	16		4	$7,500
8	Pentala Harikrishna (IND)	8	6½	14½		WC (2.5)	$7,500
9	Vidit Gujrathi (IND)	6	8½	14½		WC (2.5)	$7,500
10	Levon Aronian (ARM)	9	4	13		1	$7,500

Tata Steel India Grand Chess Tour Rapid, 22–24 November 2019, Kolkata, India
	Player	Rating	1	2	3	4	5	6	7	8	9	10	Points
1	Magnus Carlsen (Norway)	2849		2	1	2	2	1	2	2	2	1	15
2	Hikaru Nakamura (United States)	2812	0		2	1	2	2	1	1	1	1	11
3	Wesley So (United States)	2802	1	0		1	1	1	2	0	1	2	9
4	Levon Aronian (Armenia)	2768	0	1	1		1	2	1	0	1	2	9
5	Anish Giri (Netherlands)	2705	0	0	1	1		1	1	2	2	1	9
6	Pentala Harikrishna (India)	2667	1	0	1	0	1		1	1	2	1	8
7	Ding Liren (China)	2832	0	1	0	1	1	1		1	2	1	8
8	Viswanathan Anand (India)	2757	0	1	2	2	0	1	1		0	1	8
9	Ian Nepomniachtchi (Russia)	2765	0	1	1	1	0	0	0	2		2	7
10	Vidit Gujrathi (India)	2674	1	1	0	0	1	1	1	1	0		6

Tata Steel India Grand Chess Tour Blitz, 25–26 November 2019, Kolkata, India
	Player	Rating	1	2	3	4	5	6	7	8	9	10	Points
1	Hikaru Nakamura (United States)	2871		½ ½	½ ½	½ 1	½ ½	½ ½	½ 1	½ ½	1 1	1 1	12
2	Magnus Carlsen (Norway)	2828	½ ½		0 0	1 ½	½ ½	½ ½	1 ½	1 1	1 1	1 1	12
3	Ding Liren (China)	2840	½ ½	1 1		½ 1	½ ½	½ ½	0 ½	½ ½	1 0	0 1	10
4	Ian Nepomniachtchi (Russia)	2830	½ 0	0 ½	½ 0		½ ½	1 ½	1 ½	1 1	0 1	1 ½	10
5	Wesley So (United States)	2763	½ ½	½ ½	½ ½	½ ½		1 ½	½ ½	0 0	½ 1	½ 1	9½
6	Anish Giri (Netherlands)	2740	½ ½	½ ½	½ ½	0 ½	0 ½		½ 1	½ 1	½ ½	1 ½	9½
7	Vidit Gujrathi (India)	2744	½ 0	0 ½	1 ½	0 ½	½ ½	½ 0		½ 1	½ ½	½ 1	8½
8	Viswanathan Anand (India)	2791	½ ½	0 0	½ ½	0 0	1 1	½ 0	½ 0		½ 1	1 ½	8
9	Pentala Harikrishna (India)	2617	0 0	0 0	0 1	1 0	½ 0	½ ½	½ ½	½ 0		1 ½	6½
10	Levon Aronian (Armenia)	2818	0 0	0 0	1 0	0 ½	½ 0	0 ½	½ 0	0 ½	0 ½		4

== Grand Chess Tour Finals ==
In 2019, the London Chess Classic once again served as the semifinals and finals for the top 4 players from the 2019 Grand Chess Tour.

The players played 2 classical games, 2 rapid games, and 4 blitz games. 6 points was awarded for a win, 3 points for a draw and 0 points for a loss in classical play. In the rapid games, 4 points was awarded for a win, 2 points for a draw, and 0 points for a loss. In the blitz games, 2 points was awarded for a win, 1 point for a draw and 0 points for a loss.

Vachier-Lagrave won the rapid playoff against Carlsen 1½–½ to advance to the final.

Semifinals
1	Magnus Carlsen (Norway)	14½
4	Maxime Vachier-Lagrave (France)	15½
2	Ding Liren (China)	19
3	Levon Aronian (Armenia)	9

Final
4	Maxime Vachier-Lagrave (France)	12
2	Ding Liren (China)	16
Third place
1	Magnus Carlsen (Norway)	17
3	Levon Aronian (Armenia)	11

== Standings ==
	Player	CIV	CRO	PAR	STL	SIN	ROU	IND	Total points	LON	Prize money
1	Ding Liren (China)	6	7	—N/a	8.3	16.5	—N/a	6	43.8	1st	$294,833
2	Maxime Vachier-Lagrave (France)	9	3	13	8.3	3.5	—N/a	—N/a	36.8	2nd	$200,000
3	Magnus Carlsen (Norway)	13	20	—N/a	5	16.5	—N/a	13	67.5	3rd	$302,500
4	Levon Aronian (Armenia)	—N/a	11	—N/a	13	1.5	11	1	37.5	4th	$161,250
5	Sergey Karjakin (Russia)	3.5	5	—N/a	6	11	11	—N/a	36.5	—N/a	$99,250
6	Viswanathan Anand (India)	—N/a	3	10	—N/a	11	8	4	36	—N/a	$97,500
7	Wesley So (United States)	7	15	—N/a	—N/a	1.5	2.5	7.5	33.5	—N/a	$110,000
8	Ian Nepomniachtchi (Russia)	3.5	7	7.5	—N/a	6.5	—N/a	5	29.5	—N/a	$68,583
9	Hikaru Nakamura (United States)	9	1	4	—N/a	3.5	—N/a	10	27.5	—N/a	$75,000
T-10	Fabiano Caruana (United States)	—N/a	11	5	3	6.5	1	—N/a	26.5	—N/a	$76,250
T-10	Anish Giri (Netherlands)	—N/a	7	1	—N/a	6.5	4.5	7.5	26.5	—N/a	$67,333
12	Shakhriyar Mamedyarov (Azerbaijan)	—N/a	3	3	1	6.5	2.5	—N/a	16	—N/a	$48,750
	Yu Yangyi (China)	—N/a	—N/a	—N/a	8.3	—N/a	—N/a	—N/a	8.3	—N/a	$20,000
	Alexander Grischuk (Russia)	—N/a	—N/a	7.5	—N/a	—N/a	—N/a	—N/a	7.5	—N/a	$17,500
	Lê Quang Liêm (Vietnam)	—N/a	—N/a	—N/a	—N/a	—N/a	7	—N/a	7	—N/a	$15,000
	Jan-Krzysztof Duda (Poland)	—N/a	—N/a	6	—N/a	—N/a	—N/a	—N/a	6	—N/a	$12,500
	Anton Korobov (Ukraine)	—N/a	—N/a	—N/a	—N/a	—N/a	6	—N/a	6	—N/a	$12,500
	Wei Yi (China)	5	—N/a	—N/a	—N/a	—N/a	—N/a	—N/a	5	—N/a	$10,000
	Vladislav Artemiev (Russia)	—N/a	—N/a	—N/a	—N/a	—N/a	4.5	—N/a	4.5	—N/a	$8,750
	Richárd Rapport (Hungary)	—N/a	—N/a	—N/a	4	—N/a	—N/a	—N/a	4	—N/a	$7,500
	Vidit Gujrathi (India)	—N/a	—N/a	—N/a	—N/a	—N/a	—N/a	2.5	2.5	—N/a	$7,500
	Pentala Harikrishna (India)	—N/a	—N/a	—N/a	—N/a	—N/a	—N/a	2.5	2.5	—N/a	$7,500
	Daniil Dubov (Russia)	—N/a	—N/a	2	—N/a	—N/a	—N/a	—N/a	2	—N/a	$7,500
	Leinier Domínguez (United States)	—N/a	—N/a	—N/a	2	—N/a	—N/a	—N/a	2	—N/a	$7,500
	Veselin Topalov (Bulgaria)	2	—N/a	—N/a	—N/a	—N/a	—N/a	—N/a	2	—N/a	$7,500
	Bassem Amin (Egypt)	1	—N/a	—N/a	—N/a	—N/a	—N/a	—N/a	1	—N/a	$7,500
