= Tata Steel Chess India =

Chess tournament held in Kolkata, India

Tata Steel Chess India is a chess tournament held in Kolkata, India. It is held using rapid and blitz chess time controls. The venue for the event is Dhanadhanya Auditorium, Kolkata.

== Winners ==
=== Open section ===
#	Year	Winner (rapid)	Winner (blitz)
1	2018	Hikaru Nakamura (United States)	Viswanathan Anand (India)
2	2019	Magnus Carlsen (Norway)	Magnus Carlsen (Norway)
3	2020	No competition (due to the COVID-19 pandemic)	
4	2021	Arjun Erigaisi (India)	Levon Aronian (Armenia)
5	2022	Nihal Sarin (India)	Arjun Erigaisi (India)
6	2023	Maxime Vachier-Lagrave (France)	Alexander Grischuk (FIDE)
7	2024	Magnus Carlsen (Norway)	Magnus Carlsen (Norway)
8	2026	Nihal Sarin (India)	Wesley So (United States)

=== Women's section ===
#	Year	Winner (rapid)	Winner (blitz)
1	2022	Anna Ushenina (Ukraine)	Vaishali Rameshbabu (India)
2	2023	Divya Deshmukh (India)	Ju Wenjun (China)
3	2024	Aleksandra Goryachkina (FIDE)	Kateryna Lagno (FIDE)
4	2026	Kateryna Lagno (FIDE)	Carissa Yip (United States)

== 2018 ==
Tata Steel Chess India 2018 was the inaugural event of the Tata Steel Chess India. Hikaru Nakamura won the rapid section of the tournament, while former World Champion Viswanathan Anand won the blitz section by winning the blitz playoffs against Nakamura after they finished joint first in the blitz double round robin.

Tata Steel Chess India Rapid, 9–11 November 2018, Kolkata, India
	Player	Rating	1	2	3	4	5	6	7	8	9	10	Total	TB	SB
1	Hikaru Nakamura (United States)	2844		½	½	½	1	½	½	½	1	1	6		
2	Pentala Harikrishna (India)	2743	½		1	½	1	0	½	1	½	1/2	5½	1	
3	Levon Aronian (Armenia)	2802	1/2	0		1	½	½	½	½	1	1	5½	0	
4	Wesley So (United States)	2808	½	½	0		½	½	½	1	1	½	5		20.75
5	Shakhriyar Mamedyarov (Azerbaijan)	2794	0	0	½	½		1	½	1	½	1	5		19.75
6	Sergey Karjakin (Russia)	2792	½	1	½	½	0		½	0	½	1	4½		
7	Viswanathan Anand (India)	2737	½	½	½	½	½	½		½	½	0	4		19.25
8	Vidit Gujrathi (India)	2660	1/2	0	½	0	0	1	½		½	1	4		16.25
9	Nihal Sarin (India)	2612	0	½	0	0	½	½	½	½		1/2	3		
10	Surya Shekhar Ganguly (India)	2608	0	½	0	½	0	0	1	0	½		2½		

Tata Steel Chess India Blitz, 13–14 November 2018, Kolkata, India
	Player	Rating	1	2	3	4	5	6	7	8	9	10	Total	TB	SB
1	Viswanathan Anand (India)	2786		½ ½	0 ½	½ 1	½ 1	½ 1	1 1	0 ½	1 1	1 1	12½		
2	Hikaru Nakamura (United States)	2893	½ ½		½ ½	1 ½	1 1	1 0	½ 1	½ 1	1 1	½ ½	12½		
3	Levon Aronian (Armenia)	2854	1 ½	½ ½		½ ½	½ 1	0 1	½ 1	1 ½	½ ½	1 1	12		
4	Wesley So (United States)	2771	½ 0	0 ½	½ ½		1 1	1 0	½ ½	1 ½	10	½ 1	10		
5	Shakhriyar Mamedyarov (Azerbaijan)	2808	½ 0	0 0	½ 0	0 0		½ ½	1 1	½ ½	0 1	1 1	8	3	
6	Pentala Harikrishna (India)	2706	½ 0	0 1	1 0	0 1	½ ½		½ 0	½ 0	10	1 ½	8	1.5	70.75
7	Vidit Gujrathi (India)	2727	0 0	½ 0	½ 0	½ ½	0 0	½ 1		½ 1	1 ½	½ 1	8	1.5	62.75
8	Sergey Karjakin (Russia)	2836	1 ½	½ 0	0 ½	0 ½	½ ½	½ 1	½ 0		0 ½	0 1	7½		
9	Surya Shekhar Ganguly (India)	2547	00	0 0	½ ½	0 1	1 0	0 1	0 ½	1 ½		0 0	6		
10	R Praggnanandhaa (India)	2366	0 0	½ ½	0 0	½ 0	00	0 ½	½ 0	1 0	1 1		5½		

Tiebreak
Name	Nov 2018 blitz rating	1	2	Total
Viswanathan Anand (India)	2786	1	½	1½
Hikaru Nakamura (United States)	2893	0	½	½

== 2019 ==
The 2019 edition of Tata Steel India Rapid and Blitz was conducted as a part of the Grand Chess Tour 2019. The winner of the tournament was decided by the combination of rapid and blitz scores of the players with 2/1/0 points system for a win/draw/loss in rapid and 1/½/0 points system for a win/draw/loss in blitz.
World Champion Magnus Carlsen won the overall event through a dominant performance in the rapid portion of the tournament and finishing joint first with Hikaru Nakamura in the blitz portion of the tournament.

2019 Tata Steel India Rapid & Blitz, November 22–26 Kolkata, India
	Player	Rapid	Blitz	Total	TB	Tour Points	Prize money
1	Magnus Carlsen (NOR)	15	12	27		13	$37,500
2	Hikaru Nakamura (USA)	11	12	23		10	$25,000
3	Wesley So (USA)	9	9½	18½		7.5	$17,500
4	Anish Giri (NED)	9	9½	18½		7.5	$17,500
5	Ding Liren (CHN)	8	10	18		6	$12,500
6	Ian Nepomniachtchi (RUS)	7	10	17		5	$10,000
7	Viswanathan Anand (IND)	8	8	16		4	$7,500
8	Pentala Harikrishna (IND)	8	6½	14½		WC (2.5)	$7,500
9	Vidit Gujrathi (IND)	6	8½	14½		WC (2.5)	$7,500
10	Levon Aronian (ARM)	9	4	13		1	$7,500

Tata Steel India Grand Chess Tour Rapid, 22-24 November 2019, Kolkata, India
	Player	Rating	1	2	3	4	5	6	7	8	9	10	Points
1	Magnus Carlsen (Norway)	2849		2	1	2	2	1	2	2	2	1	15
2	Hikaru Nakamura (United States)	2812	0		2	1	2	2	1	1	1	1	11
3	Wesley So (United States)	2802	1	0		1	1	1	2	0	1	2	9
4	Levon Aronian (Armenia)	2768	0	1	1		1	2	1	0	1	2	9
5	Anish Giri (Netherlands)	2705	0	0	1	1		1	1	2	2	1	9
6	Pentala Harikrishna (India)	2667	1	0	1	0	1		1	1	2	1	8
7	Ding Liren (China)	2832	0	1	0	1	1	1		1	2	1	8
8	Viswanathan Anand (India)	2757	0	1	2	2	0	1	1		0	1	8
9	Ian Nepomniachtchi (Russia)	2765	0	1	1	1	0	0	0	2		2	7
10	Vidit Gujrathi (India)	2674	1	1	0	0	1	1	1	1	0		6

Tata Steel India Grand Chess Tour Blitz, 25–26 November 2019, Kolkata, India
	Player	Rating	1	2	3	4	5	6	7	8	9	10	Points
1	Hikaru Nakamura (United States)	2871		½ ½	½ ½	½ 1	½ ½	½ ½	½ 1	½ ½	1 1	1 1	12
2	Magnus Carlsen (Norway)	2828	½ ½		0 0	1 ½	½ ½	½ ½	1 ½	1 1	1 1	1 1	12
3	Ding Liren (China)	2840	½ ½	1 1		½ 1	½ ½	½ ½	0 ½	½ ½	1 0	0 1	10
4	Ian Nepomniachtchi (Russia)	2830	½ 0	0 ½	½ 0		½ ½	1 ½	1 ½	1 1	0 1	1 ½	10
5	Wesley So (United States)	2763	½ ½	½ ½	½ ½	½ ½		1 ½	½ ½	0 0	½ 1	½ 1	9½
6	Anish Giri (Netherlands)	2740	½ ½	½ ½	½ ½	0 ½	0 ½		½ 1	½ 1	½ ½	1 ½	9½
7	Vidit Gujrathi (India)	2744	½ 0	0 ½	1 ½	0 ½	½ ½	½ 0		½ 1	½ ½	½ 1	8½
8	Viswanathan Anand (India)	2791	½ ½	0 0	½ ½	0 0	1 1	½ 0	½ 0		½ 1	1 ½	8
9	Pentala Harikrishna (India)	2617	0 0	0 0	0 1	1 0	½ 0	½ ½	½ ½	½ 0		1 ½	6½
10	Levon Aronian (Armenia)	2818	0 0	0 0	1 0	0 ½	½ 0	0 ½	½ 0	0 ½	0 ½		4

== 2021 ==
Tata Steel Chess India Rapid, 17–19 November 2021, Kolkata, India
	Player	Rating	1	2	3	4	5	6	7	8	9	10	Total	TB	SB
1	Arjun Erigaisi (India)	2323		½	0	½	1	1	1	1	½	1	6½		
2	Levon Aronian (Armenia)	2761	½		½	1	½	1	½	0	1	½	5½	1½	
3	R Praggnanandhaa (India)	1821	1	½		½	½	½	½	½	1	½	5½	1	
4	Vidit Gujrathi (India)	2639	½	0	½		½	½	½	1	1	1	5½	½	
5	Karthikeyan Murali (India)	2388	0	½	½	½		½	1	½	½	1	5		19.75
6	Sam Shankland (USA)	2647	0	0	½	½	½		1	1	½	1	5		19.00
7	Parham Maghsoodloo (Iran)	2516	0	½	½	½	0	0		1	1	1	4½		
8	Lê Quang Liêm (Vietnam)	2715	0	1	½	0	½	0	0		1	1	4		
9	Adhiban Baskaran (India)	2626	½	0	0	0	½	½	0	0		½	2		
10	R Vaishali (India)	2210	0	½	½	0	0	0	0	0	½		1½		

Tata Steel Chess India Blitz, 20–21 November 2021, Kolkata, India
	Player	Rating	1	2	3	4	5	6	7	8	9	10	Total	TB	SB
1	Levon Aronian (Armenia)	2767		½ 0	0 ½	½ ½	½ 1	½ 1	1 0	1 1	1 ½	11	11½		
2	Arjun Erigaisi (India)	2616	½ 1		½ 0	½ 0	1 0	½ 1	1 ½	½ ½	1 1	1 1	11½		
3	Parham Maghsoodloo (Iran)	2601	1 ½	½ 1		0 1	1 0	0 1	1 1	0 0	1 0	1 1	11		
4	Nihal Sarin (India)	2667	½ ½	½ 1	1 0		0 1	½ 0	1 1	0 1	0 1	1 1	11		
5	Gukesh D (India)	2376	½ 0	0 1	0 1	1 0		1 1	½ 1	0 0	1 1	½ ½	10		
6	Lê Quang Liêm (Vietnam)	2774	½ 0	½ 0	1 0	½ 1	0 0		0 ½	1 0	1 ½	1 1	8½		
7	Sam Shankland (USA)	2660	0 1	0 ½	0 0	0 0	½ 0	1 ½		1 1	1 1	½ 0	8		
8	Raunak Sadhwani (India)	2517	0 0	½ ½	1 1	1 0	1 1	0 1	0 0		0 0	0 1	8		
9	Vidit Gujrathi (India)	2739	0 ½	0 0	0 1	1 0	0 0	0 ½	0 0	1 1		1½	6½		
10	Harika Dronavalli (India)	2422	0 0	0 0	0 0	0 0	½ ½	0 0	½ 1	1 0	0 ½		4		

Tiebreak
Name	Nov 2021 blitz rating	1	2	A	Total
Levon Aronian (Armenia)	2767	½	½	1	2
Arjun Erigaisi (India)	2616	½	½	0	1

== 2022 ==
Tata Steel Chess India Rapid Open, 29 November–1 December 2022, Kolkata, India
	Player	Rating	1	2	3	4	5	6	7	8	9	10	Points	H2H	SB	Wins
1	Nihal Sarin (India)	2616		0	1	½	1	1	½	1	½	1	6½			
2	Arjun Erigaisi (India)	2628	1		½	1	½	1	1	½	½	0	6			
3	Vidit Gujrathi (India)	2662	0	½		½	½	½	1	½	½	½	4½	2½		
4	Hikaru Nakamura (United States)	2789	½	0	½		½	1	0	1	0	1	4½	2	18.25	
5	Gukesh D (India)	2632	0	½	½	½		0	1	1	0	1	4½	2	18.00	
6	Shakhriyar Mamedyarov (Azerbaijan)	2747	0	0	½	0	1		½	½	1	1	4½	2	17.00	
7	Nodirbek Abdusattorov (Uzbekistan)	2676	½	0	0	1	0	½		½	1	1	4½	1½		
8	Parham Maghsoodloo (Iran)	2641	0	½	½	0	0	½	½		1	1	4	1		
9	Wesley So (United States)	2784	½	½	½	1	1	0	0	0		½	4	0		
10	S. P. Sethuraman (India)	2545	0	1	½	0	0	0	0	0	½		2			

Tata Steel Chess India Rapid Women, 29 November–1 December 2022, Kolkata, India
	Player	Rating	1	2	3	4	5	6	7	8	9	10	Points	H2H	SB	Wins
1	Anna Ushenina (Ukraine)	2371		½	½	1	½	½	1	1	½	1	6½	½	26	4
2	Nana Dzagnidze (Georgia)	2475	½		½	½	½	1	1	1	½	1	6½	½	26	4
3	Harika Dronavalli (India)	2475	½	½		½	½	½	1	½	½	1	5½			
4	Mariya Muzychuk (Ukraine)	2476	0	½	½		½	½	1	1	½	½	5	1		
5	Koneru Humpy (India)	2474	½	½	½	½		½	0	½	1	1	5	1		
6	R Vaishali (India)	2351	½	0	½	½	½		0	1	1	1	5	1		
7	Oliwia Kiolbasa (Poland)	2304	0	0	0	0	1	1		1	½	1	4½			
8	Vantika Agrawal (India)	2262	0	0	½	0	½	0	0		1	1	3	1		
9	Anna Muzychuk (Ukraine)	2458	½	½	½	½	0	0	½	0		½	3	0		
10	Savitha Shri B (India)	2311	0	0	0	½	0	0	0	0	½		1			

Tiebreak
Name	Rating	1	2	Total
Anna Ushenina (Ukraine)	2371	1	1	2
Nana Dzagnidze (Georgia)	2475	0	0	0

Tata Steel Chess India Blitz Open, 3–4 December 2022, Kolkata, India
	Player	Rating	1	2	3	4	5	6	7	8	9	10	Points	H2H	SB	Wins
1	Arjun Erigaisi (India)	2750		1 1	0 1	1 0	½ 1	1 ½	½ ½	½ 1	1 0	1 1	12½			
2	Hikaru Nakamura (United States)	2909	0 0		½ ½	1 0	½ 1	1 1	0 1	1 1	1 1	0 1	11½			
3	Shakhriyar Mamedyarov (Azerbaijan)	2733	1 0	½ ½		½ ½	0 0	1 ½	1 ½	1 0	0 ½	1 1	9½			
4	Parham Maghsoodloo (Iran)	2672	0 1	0 1	½ ½		1 ½	0 0	0 1	1 ½	½ ½	1 0	9	1½		
5	Vidit Gujrathi (India)	2669	½ 0	½ 0	1 1	0 ½		0 1	1 0	½ 1	1 0	1 0	9	½		
6	R Praggnanandhaa (India)	2599	0 ½	0 0	0 ½	1 1	1 0		0 1	1 0	1 ½	0 1	8½			
7	Nihal Sarin (India)	2702	½ ½	1 0	0 ½	1 0	0 1	1 0		1 0	½ 0	0 1	8	1	73.50	
8	Wesley So (United States)	2763	½ 0	0 0	0 1	0 ½	½ 0	0 1	0 1		1 ½	1 1	8	1	65.50	
9	Nodirbek Abdusattorov (Uzbekistan)	2666	0 1	0 0	1 ½	½ ½	0 1	0 ½	½ 1	0 ½		0 ½	7½			
10	Gukesh D (India)	2632	0 0	1 0	0 0	0 1	0 1	1 0	1 0	0 0	1 ½		6½			

Tata Steel Chess India Blitz Women, 3–4 December 2022, Kolkata, India
	Player	Rating	1	2	3	4	5	6	7	8	9	10	Points	H2H	SB	Wins
1	R Vaishali (India)	2361		½ ½	½ ½	0 0	1 1	1 ½	1 1	1 1	1 1	1 1	13½			
2	Mariya Muzychuk (Ukraine)	2427	½ ½		1 0	½ ½	1 0	1 1	1 0	1 1	1 0	1 1	12			
3	Harika Dronavalli (India)	2407	½ ½	0 1		0 1	1 ½	½ 1	½ 0	1 1	½ 1	1 0	11			
4	Anna Muzychuk (Ukraine)	2460	1 1	½ ½	1 0		0 0	1 ½	½ ½	0 1	1 1	0 1	10½			
5	Koneru Humpy (India)	2474	0 0	0 1	0 ½	1 1		½ ½	½ 0	1 0	1 1	½ 1	9½			
6	Anna Ushenina (Ukraine)	2395	0 ½	0 0	½ 0	0 ½	½ ½		1 1	1 ½	½ 1	½ ½	8½	2		
7	Nana Dzagnidze (Georgia)	2416	0 0	0 1	½ 1	½ ½	½ 1	0 0		0 1	0 1	½ 1	8½	0		
8	Savitha Shri B (India)	2311	0 0	0 0	0 0	1 0	0 1	0 ½	1 0		1 0	1 1	6½			
9	Oliwia Kiolbasa (Poland)	2279	0 0	0 1	½ 0	0 0	0 0	½ 0	1 0	0 1		1 1	6			
10	Bhakti Kulkarni (India)	2209	0 0	0 0	0 1	1 0	½ 0	½ ½	½ 0	0 0	0 0		4			

== 2023 ==
=== Open section ===
Tata Steel Chess India Rapid Open, 5–7 September 2023, Kolkata, India
	Player	Rating	1	2	3	4	5	6	7	8	9	10	Points	H2H	SB	Wins
1	Maxime Vachier-Lagrave (France)	2755		½	½	½	1	½	1	1	1	1	7			
2	Teimour Radjabov (Azerbaijan)	2680	½		0	1	0	½	1	1	½	1	5½			
3	Praggnanandhaa R (India)	2703	½	1		½	1	0	1	0	1	0	5			
4	Alexander Grischuk (FIDE)	2709	½	0	½		½	½	½	1	1	½	5			
5	Vidit Gujrathi (India)	2694	0	1	0	½		1	1	1	0	½	5			
6	Gukesh D (India)	2651	½	½	1	½	0		½	0	½	1	4½			
7	Nodirbek Abdusattorov (Uzbekistan)	2731	0	0	0	½	0	½		1	1	1	4			
8	Vincent Keymer (Germany)	2633	0	0	1	0	0	1	0		1	½	3½			
9	Arjun Erigaisi (India)	2675	0	½	0	0	1	½	0	0		1	3			
10	Pentala Harikrishna (India)	2646	0	0	1	½	½	0	0	½	0		2½			

Tata Steel Chess India Blitz Open, 8–9 September 2023, Kolkata, India
	Player	Rating	1	2	3	4	5	6	7	8	9	10	Points	H2H	SB	Wins
1	Alexander Grischuk (FIDE)	2693		½ ½	½ 1	½ 0	1 ½	½ ½	½ 1	1 1	1 1	½ ½	12			
2	Nodirbek Abdusattorov (Uzbekistan)	2708	½ ½		0 1	½ ½	0 0	1 1	1 1	0 1	0 1	1 1	11			
3	Praggnanandhaa R (India)	2632	½ 0	1 0		1 ½	1 ½	1 ½	0 0	0 1	1 1	1 1	11			
4	Arjun Erigaisi (India)	2728	½ 1	½ ½	0 ½		1 ½	½ 1	½ ½	1 1	½ 0	0 1	10½			
5	Maxime Vachier-Lagrave (France)	2740	0 ½	1 1	0 ½	0 ½		1 0	0 1	0 1	1 ½	1 ½	9½			
6	Pentala Harikrishna (India)	2634	½ ½	0 0	0 ½	½ 0	0 1		½ 1	1 0	1 1	½ ½	8½			
7	Vidit Gujrathi (India)	2641	½ 0	0 0	1 1	½ ½	1 0	½ 0		½ 0	1 ½	1 0	8			
8	Gukesh D (India)	2659	0 0	1 0	1 0	0 0	1 0	0 1	½ 1		0 0	1 1	7½			
9	Vincent Keymer (Germany)	2645	0 0	1 0	0 0	½ 1	0 ½	0 0	0 ½	1 1		1 0	6½			
10	Teimour Radjabov (Azerbaijan)	2707	½ ½	0 0	0 0	1 0	0 ½	½ ½	0 1	0 0	0 1		5½			

=== Women's section ===
Tata Steel Chess India Rapid Women, 31 August–2 September 2023, Kolkata, India
	Player	Rating	1	2	3	4	5	6	7	8	9	10	Points	H2H	SB	Wins
1	Divya Deshmukh (India)	2216		½	0	1	1	1	½	1	1	1	7			
2	Ju Wenjun (China)	2592	½		½	½	1	½	½	1	1	1	6½			
3	Polina Shuvalova (FIDE)	2358	1	½		½	½	1	½	1	½	0	5½			
4	Harika Dronavalli (India)	2459	0	½	½		1	½	½	½	½	½	4½			
5	Vantika Agrawal (India)	2307	0	0	½	0		1	1	½	0	1	4			
6	Koneru Humpy (India)	2473	0	½	0	½	0		1	1	0	1	4			
7	Anna Ushenina (Ukraine)	2384	½	½	½	½	0	0		½	½	1	4			
8	Savitha Shri B (India)	2236	0	0	0	½	½	0	½		1	1	3½			
9	Irina Krush (United States)	2405	0	0	½	½	1	1	½	0		0	3½			
10	Nino Batsiashvili (Georgia)	2364	0	0	1	½	0	0	0	0	1		2½			

Tata Steel Chess India Blitz Women, 3–4 September 2023, Kolkata, India
	Player	Rating	1	2	3	4	5	6	7	8	9	10	Points	H2H	SB	Wins
1	Ju Wenjun (China)	2536		½ 0	0 ½	1 ½	0 1	1 0	1 1	1 1	1 1	1 1	12½			
2	Koneru Humpy (India)	2460	½ 1		1 ½	1 1	1 1	½ 0	0 ½	½ 1	½ 1	0 1	12			
3	Harika Dronavalli (India)	2429	1 ½	0 ½		1 1	1 0	½ ½	½ 0	½ 0	1 ½	1 1	10½			
4	Divya Deshmukh (India)	2231	0 ½	0 0	0 0		1 ½	½ 1	1 1	1 1	1 1	½ ½	10½			
5	Polina Shuvalova (FIDE)	2306	1 0	0 0	0 1	0 ½		1 1	1 1	½ 0	½ 1	½ 1	10			
6	Irina Krush (United States)	2367	0 1	½ 1	½ ½	½ 0	0 0		½ 1	0 ½	1 0	1 1	9			
7	Anna Ushenina (Ukraine)	2361	0 0	1 ½	½ 1	0 0	0 0	½ 0		1 1	½ 1	0 0	7			
8	Vantika Agrawal (India)	2267	0 0	½ 0	½ 1	0 0	½ 1	1 ½	0 0		1 0	0 1	7			
9	Nino Batsiashvili (Georgia)	2231	0 0	½ 0	0 ½	0 0	½ 0	0 1	½ 0	0 1		1 1	6			
10	Savitha Shri B (India)	2172	0 0	1 0	0 0	½ ½	½ 0	0 0	1 1	1 0	0 0		5½			

== 2024 ==
=== Open section ===
Tata Steel Chess India Rapid Open, 13–15 November 2024, Kolkata, India
	Player	Rating	1	2	3	4	5	6	7	8	9	10	Points	H2H	SB	Wins
1	Magnus Carlsen (Norway)	2825		½	1	½	1	½	1	1	1	1	7½			
2	R Praggnanandhaa (India)	2676	½		½	0	½	1	½	1	½	1	5½	½	22.50	
3	Wesley So (United States)	2735	0	½		1	½	½	½	1	1	½	5½	½	21.75	
4	Nodirbek Abdusattorov (Uzbekistan)	2742	½	1	0		1	½	½	0	½	1	5			
5	Vincent Keymer (Germany)	2642	0	½	½	0		1	1	½	1	0	4½			
6	Nihal Sarin (India)	2679	½	0	½	½	0		½	½	1	½	4			
7	Daniil Dubov (FIDE)	2686	0	½	½	½	0	½		½	½	½	3½	½	14.75	
8	Arjun Erigaisi (India)	2706	0	0	0	1	½	½	½		½	½	3½	½	14.00	
9	Vidit Gujrathi (India)	2661	0	½	0	½	0	0	½	½		1	3	1		
10	S. L. Narayanan (India)	2579	0	0	½	0	1	½	½	½	0		3	0		

Tata Steel Chess India Blitz Open, 16–17 November 2024, Kolkata, India
	Player	Rating	1	2	3	4	5	6	7	8	9	10	Points	H2H	SB	Wins
1	Magnus Carlsen (Norway)	2893		½ ½	0 1	1 ½	½ 1	½ 1	1 ½	1 ½	1 1	1 ½	13			
2	Wesley So (United States)	2797	½ ½		1 ½	0 1	½ 1	½ 1	0 1	1 1	0 1	0 1	11½			
3	Arjun Erigaisi (India)	2738	1 0	0 ½		0 0	1 0	½ 1	1 1	1 1	½ 1	½ ½	10½			
4	R Praggnanandhaa (India)	2707	0 ½	1 0	1 1		0 1	1 ½	1 0	1 0	0 ½	1 0	9½			
5	Vidit Gujrathi (India)	2650	½ 0	½ 0	0 1	1 0		½ 1	1 0	0 1	1 1	½ 0	9	1½		
6	Daniil Dubov (FIDE)	2806	½ 0	½ 0	½ 0	0 ½	½ 0		½ 1	1 1	1 ½	1 ½	9	½		
7	Nodirbek Abdusattorov (Uzbekistan)	2715	0 ½	1 0	0 0	0 1	0 1	½ 0		½ 0	1 1	1 ½	8			
8	Nihal Sarin (India)	2711	0 ½	0 0	0 0	0 1	1 0	0 0	½ 1		1 0	1 1	7			
9	S. L. Narayanan (India)	2645	0 0	1 0	½ 0	1 ½	0 0	0 ½	0 0	0 1		1 1	6½			
10	Vincent Keymer (Germany)	2578	0 ½	1 0	½ ½	0 1	½ 1	0 ½	0 ½	0 0	0 0		6			

=== Women's section ===
Tata Steel Chess India Rapid Women, 13–15 November 2024, Kolkata, India
	Player	Rating	1	2	3	4	5	6	7	8	9	10	Points	H2H	SB	Wins
1	Aleksandra Goryachkina (FIDE)	2472		½	1	1	½	1	1	1	1	½	7½			
2	Nana Dzagnidze (Georgia)	2427	½		½	½	½	0	1	1	½	1	5½			
3	Vantika Agrawal (India)	2314	0	½		½	½	1	0	1	½	1	5			
4	Kateryna Lagno (FIDE)	2436	0	½	½		1	1	½	0	½	½	4½	2		
5	Harika Dronavalli (India)	2416	½	½	½	0		½	1	0	1	½	4½	½	19.75	
6	Valentina Gunina (FIDE)	2384	0	1	0	0	½		1	1	0	1	4½	½	17.75	
7	Divya Deshmukh (India)	2401	0	0	1	½	0	0		½	1	½	3½	1½		
8	Vaishali Rameshbabu (India)	2359	0	0	0	1	1	0	½		½	½	3½	1		
9	Alexandra Kosteniuk (Switzerland)	2508	0	½	½	½	0	1	0	½			3½	½		
10	Koneru Humpy (India)	2451	½	0	0	½	½	0	½	½	½		3			

Tata Steel Chess India Blitz Women, 16–17 November 2024, Kolkata, India
	Player	Rating	1	2	3	4	5	6	7	8	9	10	Points	H2H	SB	Wins
1	Kateryna Lagno (FIDE)	2430		1 0	½ ½	½ 1	½ ½	½ ½	1 ½	1 0	1 ½	1 1	11½			
2	Valentina Gunina (FIDE)	2360	0 1		1 0	1 1	0 0	1 0	1 ½	1 1	0 1	1 ½	11			
3	Aleksandra Goryachkina (FIDE)	2453	½ ½	0 1		1 0	0 ½	1 ½	½ ½	½ 0	½ 1	1 ½	9½	1	83.50	
4	Vantika Agrawal (India)	2249	½ 0	0 0	0 1		1 ½	1 1	½ 1	½ 1	0 ½	1 0	9½	1	81.75	
5	Alexandra Kosteniuk (Switzerland)	2473	½ ½	1 1	1 ½	0 ½		½ 1	0 ½	0 0	0 0	1 1	9	1½		
6	Koneru Humpy (India)	2423	½ ½	0 1	0 ½	0 0	½ 0		½ ½	1 1	1 1	1 0	9	½		
7	Harika Dronavalli (India)	2411	0 ½	0 ½	½ ½	½ 0	1 ½	½ ½		½ ½	1 1	0 ½	8½			
8	Vaishali Rameshbabu (India)	2362	0 1	0 0	½ 1	½ 0	1 1	0 0	½ ½		1 1	0 0	8			
9	Divya Deshmukh (India)	2333	0 ½	1 0	½ 0	1 ½	1 1	0 0	0 0	0 0		1 1	7½			
10	Nana Dzagnidze (Georgia)	2398	0 0	0 ½	0 ½	0 1	0 0	0 1	1 ½	1 1	0 0		6½			

== 2026 ==
=== Open Section ===
Tata Steel Chess India Rapid Open, 7–9 January 2026, Kolkata, India
	Player	Rating	1	2	3	4	5	6	7	8	9	10	Points	H2H	SB	Wins
1	Nihal Sarin (India)	2660		½	0	1	1	1	½	1	½	1	6½		26.50	5
2	Viswanathan Anand (India)	2721	½		0	1	1	½	½	1	½	1	6		24.50	4
3	Arjun Erigaisi (India)	2746	1	1		½	1	0	0	0	1	½	5	1½	24.25	4
4	Wesley So (United States)	2705	0	0	½		½	½	½	1	1	1	5	1	18.00	3
5	Hans Niemann (United States)	2636	0	0	0	½		1	½	1	1	1	5	½	17.75	4
6	R Praggnanandhaa (India)	2662	½	½	1	½	0		½	1	0	½	4½	½	20.25	2
7	Vidit Gujrathi (India)	2632	0	½	1	½	½	½		½	½	½	4½	½	19.50	1
8	Volodar Murzin (FIDE)	2603	0	0	1	0	0	0	½		1	1	3½	1	12.25	3
9	Wei Yi (China)	2746	½	½	0	0	0	1	½	0		1	3½	0	14.50	2
10	Aravindh Chithambaram (India)	2603	0	0	½	0	0	0	½	½	0		1½		7.00	0

Tata Steel Chess India Blitz Open, 10–11 January 2026, Kolkata, India
	Player	Rating	1	2	3	4	5	6	7	8	9	10	Points	H2H	SB	Wins
1	Wesley So (United States)	2781		1 ½	1 ½	1 ½	0 1	½ 0	½ ½	1 ½	1 1	1 ½	12		101.25	8
2	Nihal Sarin (India)	2705	0 ½		0 1	1 0	0 ½	1 1	1 1	1 1	1 0	½ ½	11	1	94.00	9
3	Arjun Erigaisi (India)	2777	0 ½	1 0		½ 0	1 ½	0 0	1 ½	1 1	1 1	1 1	11	1	85.75	9
4	Hans Niemann (United States)	2686	0 ½	0 1	½ 1		½ 1	1 0	½ 1	0 1	0 0	1 1	10	1½	86.75	8
5	Vidit Gujrathi (India)	2671	1 0	1 ½	0 ½	½ 0		0 1	½ 1	0 ½	1 ½	1 1	10	½	82.25	7
6	R Praggnanandhaa (India)	2691	½ 1	0 0	1 1	0 1	1 0		½ 0	½ ½	½ 1	0 1	9½		85.25	7
7	Wei Yi (China)	2705	½ ½	0 0	0 ½	½ 0	½ 0	½ 1		½ 1	1 1	0 1	8½		69.75	5
8	Viswanathan Anand (India)	2720	0 ½	0 0	0 0	1 0	1 ½	½ ½	½ 0		1 1	1 ½	8		62.75	5
9	Volodar Murzin (FIDE)	2656	0 0	0 1	0 0	1 1	0 ½	½ 0	0 0	0 0		1 1	6		48.75	5
10	Aravindh Chithambaram (India)	2585	0 ½	½ ½	0 0	0 0	0 0	1 0	1 0	0 ½	0 0		4		39.00	2

==== Women's section ====
Tata Steel Chess India Rapid Women, 7–9 January 2026, Kolkata, India
	Player	Rating	1	2	3	4	5	6	7	8	9	10	Points	H2H	SB	Wins
1	Kateryna Lagno (FIDE)	2421		1	½	½	½	½	½	1	1	1	6½		27.25	4
2	Aleksandra Goryachkina (FIDE)	2512	0		½	1	1	½	0	½	1	½	5		20.75	3
3	Divya Deshmukh (India)	2422	½	0		½	1	½	½	0	1	½	4½	2½	19.75	2
4	Harika Dronavalli (India)	2416	½	½	½		½	½	1	½	0	½	4½	2½	20.75	1
5	Vaishali Rameshbabu (India)	2392	½	0	0	½		1	1	½	0	1	4½	2½	20.00	3
6	Nana Dzagnidze (Georgia)	2392	½	½	½	½	0		1	1	½	0	4½	2	20.50	2
7	Carissa Yip (United States)	2347	½	1	½	0	0	0		1	1	½	4½	½	19.75	3
8	Stavroula Tsolakidou (Greece)	2347	0	½	1	½	½	0	0		1	½	4		16.75	2
9	Vantika Agrawal (India)	2325	0	0	0	1	1	½	0	0		1	3½	1	14.75	3
10	Rakshitta Ravi (India)	2148	0	½	½	½	0	1	½	½	0		3½	0	15.75	1

Tata Steel Chess India Blitz Women, 10–11 January 2026, Kolkata, India
	Player	Rating	1	2	3	4	5	6	7	8	9	10	Points	TB	H2H	SB
1	Carissa Yip (United States)	2347		0 0	0 ½	½ 1	1 1	1 ½	½ ½	1 ½	1 0	1 ½	10½	1½	0	90.00
2	Vantika Agrawal (India)	2246	1 1		0 1	½ ½	1 1	½ 1	1 0	½ 0	½ 0	0 1	10½	½	2	95.50
3	Stavroula Tsolakidou (Greece)	2410	1 ½	1 0		1 1	½ 0	0 1	0 ½	0 0	1 ½	1 1	10			87.75
4	Aleksandra Goryachkina (FIDE)	2444	½ 0	½ ½	0 0		1 1	½ 0	1 1	½ 1	½ ½	1 0	9½		2	83.25
5	Vaishali Rameshbabu (India)	2372	0 0	0 0	½ 1	0 0		1 0	1 1	1 0	1 1	1 1	9½		0	78.00
6	Kateryna Lagno (FIDE)	2445	0 ½	½ 0	1 0	½ 1	0 1		1 1	1 ½	0 ½	0 0	8½		3½	78.00
7	Divya Deshmukh (India)	2375	½ ½	0 1	1 ½	0 0	0 0	0 0		1 ½	1 ½	1 1	8½		1½	73.75
8	Nana Dzagnidze (Georgia)	2310	0 ½	½ 1	1 1	½ 0	0 1	0 ½	0 ½		0 1	1 0	8½		1	78.25
9	Harika Dronavalli (India)	2357	0 1	½ 1	0 ½	½ ½	0 0	1 ½	0 ½	1 0		1 0	8			72.75
10	Rakshitta Ravi (India)	2177	0 ½	1 0	0 0	0 1	0 0	1 1	0 0	0 1	0 1		6½			58.75

Tiebreak
Name	Jan 2026 blitz rating	1	2	Total
Vantika Agrawal (India)	2246	0	½	½
Carissa Yip (United States)	2347	1	½	1½
