= Vantika Agrawal =

Indian chess player (born 2002)

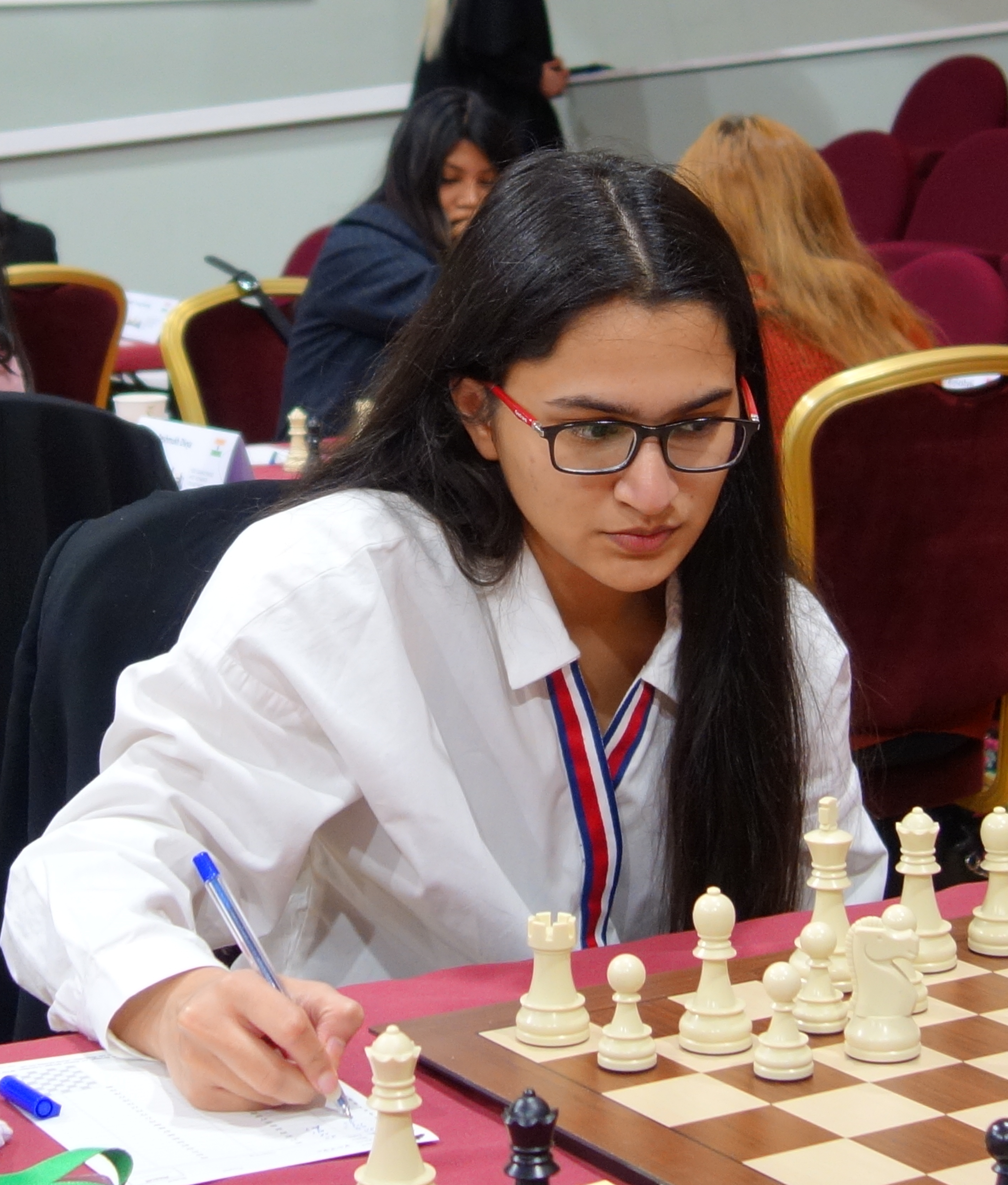

Personal information
- Born: 28 September 2002 (age 24) Uttar Pradesh, India

Chess career
- Country: India
- Title: International Master (2023); Woman Grandmaster (2021)
- Peak rating: 2435 (September 2023)

Vantika Agrawal (born September 2002) is an Indian chess player who holds the FIDE titles of Woman Grandmaster and International Master. She is a three-time gold medalist at the Chess Olympiad including two gold medals at the 45th Chess Olympiad in 2024 at Budapest. She won a silver medal with the Indian Team at the Hangzhou 2022 Asian Games. Agrawal's accolades also include medals in Commonwealth, World Youth, Asian Youth and National Championships.

== Early life and education ==
Vantika was born to Ashish and Sangeeta Agrawal on 28 September 2002 in Uttar Pradesh, India where she did her schooling from Amity International School, Noida. She started playing chess at a very young age of seven along with her elder brother. Vantika won her first major gold medal at the age of nine at the U-9 Asian Schools Championship, Delhi. Both of her parents are Chartered Accountants. She holds a B.Com. (honours) degree from Shri Ram College of Commerce, Delhi University.

== Achievements ==
=== 2011 ===
Gold in Asian Schools Championship U-9 Girls, Delhi, India.

=== 2013 ===
Silver in National U-11 Chess Championship at Delhi, India

=== 2014 ===
Silver in National U-13 Chess Championship at Jamshedpur, India.

=== 2015 ===
- Bronze in World Youth U-14 Girls, Greece.
- Silver in Commonwealth U-14 at Delhi, India.
- Tied for bronze medal in Asian Youth, South Korea.
- Bronze in National U-13 Girls at Gurgaon, India.

=== 2016 ===
- Tied for 2nd position in World Youth U-14 Girls at Khanty-Mansiysk, Russia.
- Bronze in Asian Youth Blitz U-14, Mongolia.
- Silver in National Sub Junior Chess Championship.

=== 2018 ===
Bronze in National Juniors Delhi, India.

=== 2019 ===
- Silver Medal in National Women Championship at Karaikudi, India.
- Silver Medal in World Youth U-18 Girls, Mumbai, India.
- 2 Silver Medals in Asian Junior, Indonesia.
- 2 Silver Medals in Western Asian Juniors at Delhi, India.

=== 2020 ===
Gold Medal in Fide Online Chess Olympiad, Aug 2020. The 12-player team also included Viswanathan Anand, Vidit Gujrathi, Harikrishna, Humpy, Harika, Vaishali and Divya among others.

=== 2021 ===
- Became the 21st Women Grand Master of India.
- Gold in National Women Chess Championship, Online.
- Silver in National Junior Chess Championship, Online.
- Achieved 1st IM Norm at Women's Grand Swiss, Riga.
- Gold in Women Category at Yerevan Open, Armenia.
- Gold for SRCC College, FIDE Binance B-Schools Cup.
- Silver in Women at Junior U-21 Round Table, Plovdiv, Bulgaria.
- Bronze in Women at Chess Mood Open, Armenia.

=== 2022 ===
- Received 2nd IM Norm while playing for India-2 on first board in 44th Chess Olympiad at Mahabalipuram, India.
- Gold in Women's Speed Chess Qualifier.
- Silver in Women Category Dubai Open.
- Bronze in Women Category Abu Dhabi Masters.

=== 2023 ===
- Won silver medal at Asian Games 2022, Hangzhou representing India, along with Koneru Humpy, Harika Dronavalli, Vaishali R and Savita Shri.
- Became the 11th Woman in India to become an International Master.
- Gold in National Women's Team at Tamil Nadu, India.
- Bronze in National Women at Kolhapur, India.
- Gold in Women category at Biel Masters, Switzerland.
- Gold in Women category at Menorca Open, Spain.
- Gold in Women category at Fagernes Open, Norway.

=== 2024 ===
- Won the 45th Women's Chess Olympiad representing India in Budapest, along with Harika Dronavalli, Vaishali R, Divya Deshmukh, and Tania Sachdev.
- Won Individual Gold for Board 4 at the 45th Chess Olympiad.

=== 2026 ===
- Finished second in the 2026 Tata Steel Chess India Women's Blitz.
- Team bronze medal in the Women's event of the 46th Chess Olympiad.
- Individual bronze on board 4 at the 46th Chess Olympiad.

== Honours Received ==
On 17 January 2025, Vantika was felicitated with the Arjuna Award for outstanding performance in Sports and Games in 2024.

Vantika was honoured by Hon'ble Prime Minister of India, Shri Narendra Modi for winning Double Gold in the 45th Chess Olympiad, Budapest in 2024. She was honoured by Hon'ble Chief Minister of Uttar Pradesh, Shri Yogi Adityanath as well.

For winning the silver medal in Asian Games 2022 Hangzhou, CM Shri Yogi Adityanath felicitated her in Lucknow.

For the 44th Chess Olympiad in Mahabalipuram, India 2022, Vantika carried the Olympiad torch through seven cities of Uttar Pradesh. The torch relay started from Agra, Kanpur then Lucknow followed by Prayagraj, Varanasi, then Gorakphur and finally ending in Ayodhya.

Agrawal received National Child Award for exceptional achievement in Chess from Hon'ble President of India, Shri Pranab Mukherjee in 2016.

For winning the gold medal at Asian School U-9 Championship in 2011, Vantika was felicitated by Shri Narendra Modi (the then Chief Minister of Gujarat).
