= Akshayakalpa =

Indian organic milk brand

Akshayakalpa Organic
- Company type: Private limited company
- Industry: Organic Milk and Milk Products
- Founded: October 2, 2010
- Founder: GNS Reddy, Shashi Kumar
- Headquarters: Tiptur, Karnataka
- Area served: Bengaluru; Chennai; Hyderabad
- Key people: Shashi Kumar - Co-founder and CEO
- Products: Milk; Curd; Cheese; Paneer; Buttermilk; Bread; Butter; Honey; Batter; Eggs; Greek Yoghurt; Fruit-based drinks; Coconuts; Bananas; Vegetables and Greens
- Website: akshayakalpa.org

Akshayakalpa Organic is an Indian organic dairy company headquartered in Tiptur, Karnataka. Founded in 2010 by Shashi Kumar and GNS Reddy, it is reported to be India’s first certified organic dairy company, producing and supplying organic milk and dairy products.

== History ==
Akshayakalpa originated from the Yuva Chetna Program. This program, which ran from 2001 to 2009, encouraged people from urban areas to teach young people and women in rural regions about agriculture and farming for their vocation of choice.

Akshayakalpa was registered as a company on October 2, 2010.

Akshayakalpa had 130 farms in the Tiptur area by 2016.

By 2020, the organization had partnered with 580 farmers in the Tiptur district, whose average income was ₹89,000 per month. The company works with farmers in and around Tiptur, Karnataka and Chengalpattu, Tamil Nadu. The organization plans to build its network by working with more than 100 such farmers and satellite farms owned by farmers in Chengalpattu.

== Philosophy ==
Akshayakalpa was founded as a farmer entrepreneurship initiative. The organization aims to address the bilateral problem of economic non-viability in agriculture, which causes farmers to move away from farming or utilize chemical fertilizers and pesticides, leading to poor-quality food for the consumer. The team identifies young farmers who have discontinued farming operations due to economic non-viability and provides them with bank links, farmers outreach, technical services and access to markets in order to encourage them to return to farming.

== Farms ==
Akshayakalpa does not own any dairy farms, but utilizes its extension officers to organize and guide local farmers who own small farms to become organic farmers. The incubation period for the farms is around 3 years, during which the company drives the farmer towards becoming certified as organic. Procurement does not take place during this period. Akshayakalpa operates a processing plant with a capacity of 40,000 litres per day, where milk collected from collaborating farmers is processed and packaged. The plant is situated on 24 acres of land, approximately 13 kilometres from Tiptur. The milk processed at this facility is supplied daily to Bangalore and Tumkur.

Akshayakalpa works with farmers to set up small organic dairy farms that are owned and looked after by the farmer. Each farm invests ₹ 25 lakhs, financed by Akshayakalpa partner banks, which is utilized to build the farms. The farms are made up of twenty-five cows, automatic milking systems, a biogas plant, a bio-digester, fodder choppers and a chilling unit. The organization assures the buyback of milk, and farmers are paid around ₹28-32 a litre depending on the fat content of the milk.

Inducting farmers to the Akshayakalpa model takes between 18 and 24 months. The farmers are educated on maintaining soil without chemicals, closed-loop soil management, and raising cows without the use of antibiotics or growth hormones. Akshayakalpa provides guidance on the design in addition to directing farmers from where to source equipment and helps with services like vaccinations and maintenance without charge, but farmers have to pay for consumables. The organization's staff of 40 members train farmers regularly and initial engagement charges are quite high.

The cows are mainly fed on green fodder grown without chemical inputs. The animals receive regular check-ups from doctors trained in ethnoveterinary practices to ensure they are healthy and produce milk free from antibiotics and growth hormones. The animals of local breeds are cross-bred with high-yielding alien animals for better adaptability.

All the farms associated with Akshayakalpa have the same design. Housing for the animals is steel-roofed sheds with rubber mats on cemented floors. The cows and calves are stall-fed but not tethered. They are kept on a dedicated paddock area, and the dung is cleared. The dung and urine are flushed into a biogas plant. The gas (methane) is used to operate a generator that produces power for eight hours a day. This electricity is used to power the day-to-day activities on farms. Further, the slurry from the biogas plant is redirected to a bio-digester. The filtrate is pumped out through a sprinkler system to the farm. The cultivation is organic, avoiding chemical fertilizers.

The milking is done with machines and the milk is chilled on-site to 4 degrees Celsius. The system sends the data to the central server where it is analyzed.
